= List of high schools in Iowa =

US highschools

This is a list of high schools in the state of Iowa. You can also see a list of school districts in Iowa.

== Adair County ==
- AC/GC High School (Adair–Casey/Guthrie Center), Guthrie Center
- Nodaway Valley High School, Greenfield

== Adams County ==
- Southwest Valley High School, Corning

== Allamakee County ==
- Kee High School, Lansing
- John R. Mott High School, Postville
- Waukon High School, Waukon

== Appanoose County ==
- Centerville High School, Centerville
- Moravia High School, Moravia
- Moulton-Udell High School, Moulton

== Audubon County ==
- Audubon High School, Audubon

== Benton County ==
- Belle Plaine High School, Belle Plaine
- Benton Community High School, Van Horne
- Vinton-Shellsburg High School, Vinton

== Black Hawk County ==
- Don Bosco High School, Gilbertville
- Dunkerton High School, Dunkerton
- Hudson High School, Hudson
- Union High School, La Porte City

=== Cedar Falls ===
- Cedar Falls High School
- Cedar Ridge Christian Schools

=== Waterloo ===
- East High School
- West High School
- Columbus Catholic High School

== Boone County ==
- Boone High School, Boone
- Ogden High School, Ogden
- Madrid High School, Madrid

== Bremer County ==
- Denver High School, Denver
- Janesville High School, Janesville
- Sumner-Fredericksburg High School, Sumner
- Tripoli High School, Tripoli
- Wapsie Valley High School, Fairbank
- Waverly-Shell Rock Community School District
  - Waverly-Shell Rock Senior High School, Waverly
  - Waverly-Shell Rock Lied Center, Waverly

== Buchanan County ==
- East Buchanan High School, Winthrop
- Independence High School, Independence
- Jesup High School, Jesup

== Buena Vista County ==
- Alta–Aurelia High School, Alta
- Newell-Fonda High School, Newell
- Sioux Central High School, Sioux Rapids

=== Storm Lake ===
- St. Mary's High School
- Storm Lake High School

== Butler County ==
- Aplington–Parkersburg High School, Parkersburg
- Clarksville High School, Clarksville
- North Butler High School, Greene

== Calhoun County ==
- Manson–Northwest Webster High School, Manson
- South Central Calhoun High School, Lake City

== Carroll County ==
- Carroll High School, Carroll
- Coon Rapids-Bayard High School, Coon Rapids
- Glidden–Ralston High School, Glidden
- Kuemper Catholic High School, Carroll
- IKM–Manning High School, Manning

== Cass County ==
- Atlantic High School, Atlantic
- CAM High School, Massena
- Griswold High School, Griswold

== Cedar County ==
- Tipton High School, Tipton
- Durant High School, Durant
- North Cedar High School, Clarence

=== West Branch ===
- Scattergood Friends School
- West Branch High School

== Cerro Gordo County ==
- Clear Lake High School, Clear Lake

=== Mason City ===
- Mason City High School
- Newman Catholic High School

== Cherokee County ==
- MMRCU High School, Marcus
- Washington High School, Cherokee

== Chickasaw County ==
- Sumner-Fredericksburg High School, Fredericksburg
- Nashua-Plainfield Junior-Senior High School, Nashua
- New Hampton High School, New Hampton

== Clarke County ==
- Clarke Community High School, Osceola
- Murray High School, Murray

== Clay County ==
- Clay Central-Everly High School, Everly
- Spencer Community High School, Spencer

== Clayton County ==
- Central Community High School, Elkader
- Clayton Ridge High School, Guttenberg
- Edgewood–Colesburg High School, Edgewood
- MFL Marmac High School, Monona

== Clinton County ==
- Calamus–Wheatland High School, Wheatland
- Camanche High School, Camanche
- Central DeWitt High School, De Witt
- Northeast High School, Goose Lake

=== Clinton ===
- Clinton High School
- Prince of Peace Preparatory

== Crawford County ==
- Ar-We-Va High School, Westside
- Denison High School, Denison

== Dallas County ==
- Adel–De Soto–Minburn (ADM) High School, Adel
- Dallas Center–Grimes High School, Grimes
- Perry High School, Perry
- Van Meter High School, Van Meter
- Woodward-Granger Community School District
  - Woodward Academy, Woodward
  - Woodward-Granger High School, Woodward

=== Waukee ===
- Waukee High School
- Waukee Northwest High School

== Davis County ==
- Davis County Community High School, Bloomfield

== Decatur County ==
- Lamoni High School, Lamoni
- Mormon Trail High School, Garden Grove
- Central Decatur Junior-Senior High School, Leon

== Delaware County ==
- Maquoketa Valley Senior High School, Delhi
- West Delaware High School, Manchester

== Des Moines County ==
- Danville High School, Danville
- Mediapolis High School, Mediapolis
- West Burlington High School, West Burlington

=== Burlington ===
- Burlington Community High School
- Great River Christian Schools
- Notre Dame High School

== Dickinson County ==
- Harris–Lake Park High School, Lake Park
- Okoboji High School, Milford
- Spirit Lake High School, Spirit Lake

== Dubuque County ==
- Cascade Junior/Senior High School, Cascade
- Western Dubuque High School, Epworth
- Beckman Catholic High School, Dyersville

=== Dubuque ===
- Dubuque Senior High School
- Hempstead High School
- Wahlert Catholic High School
- Tri-State Christian School

== Emmet County ==
- North Union High School, Armstrong
- Estherville–Lincoln Central Community School District
  - Estherville–Lincoln Central High School, Estherville
  - Forest Ridge Community Youth Service High School, Gruver

== Fayette County ==
- North Fayette Valley High School, West Union
- Oelwein High School, Oelwein
- Starmont High School, Arlington
- West Central High School, Maynard

== Floyd County ==
- Charles City High School, Charles City
- Rockford Junior-Senior High School, Rockford

== Franklin County ==
- Hampton–Dumont High School, Hampton
- West Fork High School, Sheffield

== Fremont County ==
- Sidney High School, Sidney
- Fremont–Mills Junior–Senior High School, Tabor

== Greene County ==
- Paton-Churdan High School, Churdan
- Greene County High School, Jefferson

== Grundy County ==
- BCLUW High School, Conrad
- Dike–New Hartford High School, Dike
- Gladbrook–Reinbeck High School, Reinbeck
- Grundy Center High School, Grundy Center

== Guthrie County ==
- AC/GC High School, Guthrie Center
- Panorama High School, Panora
- West Central Valley High School, Stuart

== Hamilton County ==
- South Hamilton High School, Jewell
- Webster City High School, Webster City

== Hancock County ==
- Garner-Hayfield-Ventura High School, Garner
- West Hancock High School, Britt

== Hardin County ==
- AGWSR High School, Ackley
- South Hardin High School, Eldora
- Iowa Falls-Alden High School, Iowa Falls

== Harrison County ==
- Boyer Valley Middle/High School, Dunlap
- Logan–Magnolia Junior/Senior High School, Logan
- Missouri Valley High School, Missouri Valley
- West Harrison High School, Mondamin
- Woodbine High School, Woodbine

== Henry County ==
- Mount Pleasant Community High School, Mount Pleasant
- New London High School, New London
- WACO High School, Wayland
- Winfield-Mt Union Junior-Senior High School, Winfield

== Howard County ==
- Crestwood High School, Cresco
- Riceville High School, Riceville

== Humboldt County ==
- Humboldt High School, Humboldt

== Ida County ==
- OABCIG High School, Ida Grove
- Ridge View High School, Holstein

== Iowa County ==
- English Valleys Jr/Sr High School, North English
- H-L-V Junior-Senior High School, Victor
- Iowa Valley Junior-Senior High School, Marengo
- Williamsburg Junior-Senior High School, Williamsburg

== Jackson County ==
- Easton Valley High School, Preston
- Maquoketa Community High School, Maquoketa

=== Bellevue ===
- Bellevue High School
- Marquette High School

== Jasper County ==
- Baxter High School, Baxter
- Colfax–Mingo High School, Colfax
- Lynnville–Sully High School, Sully
- Newton Community School District
  - Basics and Beyond Alternative School, Newton
  - Newton Senior High School, Newton
- PCM High School, Monroe

== Jefferson County ==
- Pekin Community High School, Packwood

=== Fairfield ===
- Fairfield High School
- Maharishi High School

== Johnson County ==
- Clear Creek–Amana High School, Tiffin
- Liberty High School, North Liberty
- Lone Tree Junior-Senior High School, Lone Tree
- Solon High School, Solon

=== Iowa City ===
- Elizabeth Tate Alternative High School
- Iowa City High School
- Iowa City West High School
- Iowa City Liberty High School
- Regina Catholic High School

== Jones County ==
- Anamosa High School, Anamosa
- Midland Community High School, Wyoming
- Monticello High School, Monticello

== Keokuk County ==
- Keota High School, Keota
- Sigourney Junior-Senior High School, Sigourney
- Tri-County High School, Thornburg

== Kossuth County ==
- North Union High School, Armstrong

=== Algona ===
- Algona High School
- Bishop Garrigan High School

== Lee County ==
- Central Lee High School, Donnellson
- Keokuk High School, Keokuk

=== Fort Madison ===
- Fort Madison High School
- Holy Trinity Catholic Schools

== Linn County ==
- Alburnett Junior-Senior High School, Alburnett
- Center Point-Urbana High School, Center Point
- Central City High School, Central City
- Lisbon High School, Lisbon
- Mount Vernon High School, Mount Vernon
- North Linn Senior High School, Troy Mills
- Springville High School, Springville

=== Cedar Rapids ===
- Cedar Valley Christian School
- Thomas Jefferson High School
- John F. Kennedy High School
- Metro High School
- Prairie High School
- Xavier High School
- George Washington High School

=== Marion ===
- Linn-Mar High School
- Marion High School

== Louisa County ==
- Louisa–Muscatine Junior/Senior High School, Letts
- Columbus Community High School, Columbus Junction
- Wapello Senior High School, Wapello

== Lucas County ==
- Chariton High School, Chariton

== Lyon County ==
- Central Lyon Senior High School, Rock Rapids
- George–Little Rock Senior High School, George
- West Lyon High School, Inwood

== Madison County ==
- Earlham Senior High School, Earlham
- Interstate 35 High School, Truro
- Winterset Senior High School, Winterset

== Mahaska County ==
- Eddyville–Blakesburg–Fremont High School, Eddyville
- North Mahaska Junior-Senior High School, New Sharon
- Oskaloosa High School, Oskaloosa

== Marion County ==
- Knoxville High School, Knoxville
- Melcher-Dallas High School, Melcher
- Pleasantville High School, Pleasantville
- Twin Cedars Junior-Senior High School, Bussey

=== Pella ===
- Pella High School

== Marshall County ==
- East Marshall Senior High School, Le Grand
- Marshalltown High School, Marshalltown
- West Marshall High School, State Center

== Mills County ==
- East Mills High School, Malvern
- Glenwood High School, Glenwood

== Mitchell County ==
- Osage High School, Osage
- St. Ansgar High School, St. Ansgar

== Monona County ==
- MVAOCOU High School, Mapleton
- West Monona High School, Onawa
- Whiting Senior High School, Whiting

== Monroe County ==
- Albia High School, Albia

== Montgomery County ==
- Red Oak High School, Red Oak
- Stanton High School, Stanton

== Muscatine County ==
- Muscatine High School, Muscatine
- West Liberty High School, West Liberty
- Wilton Junior-Senior High School, Wilton

== O'Brien County ==
- Hartley–Melvin–Sanborn High School, Hartley
- Sheldon High School, Sheldon
- South O'Brien High School, Paullina

== Osceola County ==
- Sibley-Ocheyedan High School, Sibley

== Page County ==
- Clarinda High School, Clarinda
- Essex Junior-Senior High School, Essex
- Shenandoah High School, Shenandoah
- South Page High School, College Springs

== Palo Alto County ==
- Emmetsburg High School, Emmetsburg
- Graettinger-Terril High School, Graettinger
- Ruthven-Ayrshire High School, Ruthven
- West Bend–Mallard High School, West Bend

== Plymouth County ==
- Akron–Westfield Senior High School, Akron
- Hinton High School, Hinton
- Kingsley–Pierson High School, Kingsley
- St. Mary's High School, Remsen

=== Le Mars ===
- Gehlen Catholic High School
- Le Mars High School

== Pocahontas County ==
- Pocahontas Area High School, Pocahontas

== Polk County ==
- Bondurant–Farrar Junior-Senior High School, Bondurant
- Johnston High School, Johnston
- North Polk High School, Alleman
- Southeast Polk High School, Runnells
- Dallas Center-Grimes High School, Grimes

=== Ankeny ===
- Ankeny Centennial High School
- Ankeny Christian Academy
- Ankeny High School

=== Des Moines ===
- East High School
- Grand View Christian School
- Hoover High School
- Lincoln High School
- North High School
- Saydel High School
- Roosevelt High School

=== Urbandale ===
- Des Moines Christian School
- Urbandale High School

=== West Des Moines ===
- Dowling Catholic High School
- Valley High School
- Walnut Creek Campus

== Pottawattamie County ==
- AHSTW High School, Avoca
- Riverside Community High School, Oakland
- Treynor High School, Treynor
- Tri-Center High School, Neola
- Underwood High School, Underwood

=== Council Bluffs ===
- Abraham Lincoln High School
- Lewis Central Senior High School
- St. Albert High School
- Thomas Jefferson High School

== Poweshiek County ==
- Brooklyn-Guernsey-Malcom Junior-Senior High School, Brooklyn
- Grinnell Community Senior High School, Grinnell
- Montezuma High School, Montezuma

== Ringgold County ==
- Diagonal Junior-Senior High School, Diagonal
- Mount Ayr High School, Mount Ayr

== Sac County ==
- East Sac County High School, Lake View

== Scott County ==
- North Scott High School, Eldridge
- Pleasant Valley High School, Riverdale

=== Bettendorf ===
- Bettendorf High School
- Rivermont Collegiate

=== Davenport ===
- Assumption High School
- Davenport Central High School
- Davenport Mid City High School
- Davenport North High School
- Davenport West High School

== Shelby County ==
- Exira-Elk Horn-Kimballton High School, Elk Horn
- Harlan Community High School, Harlan

== Sioux County ==
- Sioux Center High School, Sioux Center
- West Sioux High School, Hawarden

=== Hull ===
- Boyden-Hull High School
- Trinity Christian High School
- Western Christian High School

=== Orange City ===
- MOC-Floyd Valley High School

=== Rock Valley ===
- Rock Valley High School

== Story County ==
- Ames High School, Ames
- Ballard Community High School, Huxley
- Collins–Maxwell High School, Maxwell
- Colo–NESCO Senior High School, Colo
- Gilbert Junior-Senior High School, Gilbert
- Nevada High School, Nevada
- Roland–Story High School, Story City

== Tama County ==
- GMG Secondary School, Garwin
- North Tama High School, Traer

=== Tama ===
- Meskwaki Settlement School
- South Tama County High School

== Taylor County ==
- Bedford High School, Bedford
- Lenox High School, Lenox

== Union County ==
- Creston Community High School, Creston
- East Union High School, Afton

== Van Buren County ==
- Van Buren County Community Middle/High School, Keosauqua

== Wapello County ==
- Cardinal High School, Eldon
- Ottumwa High School, Ottumwa

== Warren County ==
- Carlisle High School, Carlisle
- Indianola High School, Indianola
- Martensdale-St. Marys Junior-Senior High School, Martensdale
- Norwalk Senior High School, Norwalk
- Southeast Warren Junior-Senior High School, Liberty Center

== Washington County ==
- Highland High School, Riverside
- Hillcrest Academy, Kalona
- Mid-Prairie High School, Wellman
- Washington High School, Washington

== Wayne County ==
- Seymour High School, Seymour
- Wayne Community Junior/Senior High School, Corydon

== Webster County ==
- Southeast Valley High School, Gowrie

=== Fort Dodge ===
- Fort Dodge Senior High School
- St. Edmond High School

== Winnebago County ==
- Forest City High School, Forest City
- Lake Mills Senior High School, Lake Mills
- North Iowa High School, Buffalo Center

== Winneshiek County ==
- Decorah High School, Decorah
- South Winneshiek High School, Calmar
- Turkey Valley Junior-Senior High School, Jackson Junction

== Woodbury County ==
- Lawton–Bronson Junior/Senior High School, Lawton
- River Valley High School, Correctionville
- Sergeant Bluff-Luton High School, Sergeant Bluff
- Westwood High School, Sloan
- Woodbury Central High School, Moville

=== Sioux City ===
- Bishop Heelan Catholic High School
- East High School
- North High School
- West High School

== Worth County ==
- Central Springs High School, Manly
- Northwood-Kensett Junior-Senior High School, Northwood

== Wright County ==
- Belmond-Klemme Community Junior-Senior High School, Belmond
- Clarion–Goldfield-Dows High School, Clarion
- Eagle Grove High School, Eagle Grove

== Defunct ==
- Buffalo High School, Buffalo (closed 2005)
- Charles City Junior-Senior High School, Charles City (closed late 1960s)
- Clermont Public School, Clermont (closed 1924)
- Clinton High School and Public Library, Clinton (closed 1922)
- Corwith–Wesley–Lu Verne High School, Corwith (closed 2015)
- Epworth School, Epworth (closed 1962)
- Fort Dodge Senior High School (1922), Fort Dodge (closed 1958)
- Grant Vocational High School, Cedar Rapids (closed 1936)
- Nishnabotna High School, Farragut (closed 2016)
- Norway High School, Norway (closed 1991)
- Old Storm Lake High School, Storm Lake (closed 1962)
- Regis High School, Cedar Rapids (merged with LaSalle High School to form Xavier High School in 1998)
- Sacred Heart School, Dubuque (closed 1949)
- St. Luke's School and Recreation Center, St. Lucas (closed 1967)
- Sioux City Central High School and Central Annex, Sioux City (closed 1972)
- Spalding Catholic High School, Alton (closed 2013)
- Washington Township Center High School, Amish (closed 1945)

== See also ==
- List of school districts in Iowa
- List of private schools in Iowa
- Wikipedia:WikiProject Missing encyclopedic articles/High schools/US/Iowa
