= Iowa Star Conference =

Iowa High School athletic conference

- Conference: IHSAA / IGHSAU
- Sports fielded: 20
- No. of teams: 15
- Region: Central, Northeast Iowa
- Website: www.iowastarconference.org

The Iowa Star Conference is a high school athletic conference in Central and Northeast Iowa. The conference comprises fifteen schools, split between north and south divisions within the conference.

== Current members ==
Institution	Location	Mascot	Colors	Affiliation	2026-2027 BEDS
North Division
Clarksville	Clarksville	Indians		Public	63
Don Bosco Catholic	Gilbertville	Dons		Private	97
Dunkerton	Dunkerton	Raiders		Public	76
Janesville	Janesville	Wildcats		Public	107
Riceville	Riceville	Wildcats		Public	83
Rockford	Rockford	Warriors		Public	63
Tripoli	Tripoli	Panthers		Public	65
Cedar Ridge Christian	Waterloo	Regents		Private	63
South Division
Baxter	Baxter	Bolts		Public	101
BCLUW	Conrad	Comets		Public	118
Collins–Maxwell	Maxwell	Spartans		Public	78
Colo–NESCO	Colo	Royals		Public	78
GMG	Garwin	Wolverines		Public	96
Meskwaki Settlement School	Tama	Warriors		Tribal	62
North Tama County	Traer	Redhawks		Public	92
Valley Lutheran	Cedar Falls	Crusaders		Private	29

=== Future members ===
Institution	Location	Mascot	Colors	Affiliation	2026-2027 BEDS
AGWSR	Ackley	Cougars		Public	159
Nashua-Plainfield	Nashua	Huskies		Public	142
North Butler	Greene	Bearcats		Public	117

== Recent history ==
North Tama County joined the Iowa Star in 2003, leaving the North Iowa Cedar League.

Former member CAL (Coulter-Alexander-Latimer) last had their own high school in the 2017–18 school year. After many years of sharing sports teams with Dows High School, and competing as CAL–Dows, Dows left the agreement and partnered with Clarion–Goldfield for the 2014–15 school year. The CAL school district still supports grades K–6, with grades 7–12 attending Hampton–Dumont; the athletic teams are referred to as Hampton-Dumont-CAL.

Members Baxter and Collins–Maxwell formerly partnered in sports, which Baxter ended that agreement to compete on their own in 2016. Both schools joined the conference separately in 2017.

BCLUW (Conrad) joined the Iowa Star Conference starting with the 2022-23 school year. BCLUW formerly competed in the North Iowa Cedar League.

On August 15, 2022, it was announced that Rockford would be joining the North Division from the Top of Iowa Conference East Division in the 2023-2024 school year.

On October 16, 2025, the North Butler Community School District announced it had accepted the invitation to join the Iowa Star Conference - North Division for the 2026-2027 calendar. North Butler is leaving the Top of Iowa Conference. Nashua-Plainfield Community School District would also be joining from the Top of Iowa Conference.

On January 23, 2026, the AGWSR Community School District announced it had accepted the invitation to join the Iowa Star Conference in 2027, leaving the North Iowa Cedar League.
