= BCLUW Community School District =

Public school district in Conrad, Iowa, United States

Coordinates: 42.225445°N 92.865850°W

Location
- Conrad, Iowa Grundy, Marshall, and Hardin counties United States
- Coordinates: 42.225445, -92.865850

District information
- Type: Local school district
- Grades: K-12
- Established: 1992
- Superintendent: Ben Petty
- Schools: 3
- Budget: $8,792,000 (2020-21)
- NCES District ID: 19044400

Students and staff
- Students: 506 (2022-23)
- Teachers: 42.77 FTE
- Staff: 51.23 FTE
- Student–teacher ratio: 11.83
- Athletic conference: Iowa Star Conference
- District mascot: Comets
- Colors: Black and Gold

Other information
- Website: www.bcluw.org

BCLUW Community School District is a rural public school district headquartered in Conrad, Iowa.

As of 2015, the school district has about 640 students in grades K-12.

Its service area includes portions of Grundy, Marshall, and Hardin counties. It serves Conrad, Beaman, Liscomb, Union, and Whitten. It also serves rural areas around Marshalltown.

The schools are BCLUW Elementary School in Conrad, BCLUW Middle School in Union, and BCLUW High School in Conrad. The school mascot is the Comets, and their colors are black and gold.

== History ==
BCLUW formed on July 1, 1992, as a consolidation of the former Beaman-Conrad-Liscomb (BCL) and Union-Whitten (UW) school districts.

In 2001, it had about 693 students.

== Operations ==
The district entered into an agreement with multiple school districts to share employees; districts may share employees as a way of saving money. For example, the BCLUW and GMG school districts share a superintendent, with the occupant working for BCLUW 60% of the time and GMG 40% of the time. Ben Petty, previously the principal of BCLUW High School, became the shared superintendent of GMG and BCLUW in 2011. By 2014 BCLUW, GMG, and the Hubbard–Radcliffe districts shared a single elementary guidance counselor, the BCLUW, GMG, North Tama, and Gladbrook–Reinbeck districts shared a single director of curriculum and innovation, BCLUW and Hubbard–Radcliffe have a single consumer sciences teacher and a single art teacher, and BCLUW and GMG have a single transportation director.

== Schools ==
- BCLUW Elementary School (Conrad)
- BCLUW High School (Conrad)

=== BCLUW High School ===
==== Athletics ====
The Comets compete in the Iowa Star Conference in the following sports:

- Bowling
- Cross country (boys and girls)
  - Boys' 1969 State Champions
- Volleyball (girls)
- Basketball (boys and girls)
- Wrestling (boys and girls)
- Track and field (boys and girls)
  - Boys' 2-time Class 1A State Champions - (1982, 2006)
- Golf (boys and girls)
  - Girls' 1990 Class 1A State Champions
- Baseball (boys)
- Softball (girls)
  - 2-time Class 2A State Champions (2009, 2010)
- Soccer (boys and girls)
- Tennis (boys and girls)

In addition, the Comets currently compete in Class A in football.

- 1976 Class 1A State Champions

== Notable employees ==
- Paula Baniszewski (under the name Paula Pace), involved in the murder of Sylvia Likens when she was 17. She worked at BCULW from 1998 to 2012, when she was fired by the district once her true identity was revealed.

== See also ==
- List of school districts in Iowa
- List of high schools in Iowa
