= GMG Community School District =

Public school district in Green Mountain, Iowa, United States

Coordinates: 42.106303°N 92.824221°W

Location
- Green Mountain, Iowa Tama and Marshall counties United States
- Coordinates: 42.106303, -92.824221

District information
- Type: Local school district
- Grades: K–12
- Established: 1987
- Superintendent: Chris Petersen
- Schools: 2
- Budget: $7,082,000 (2020-21)
- NCES District ID: 1900060

Students and staff
- Students: 478 (2022-23)
- Teachers: 40.76 FTE
- Staff: 43.29 FTE
- Student–teacher ratio: 11.73
- Athletic conference: Iowa Star
- District mascot: Wolverines
- Colors: Black and Blue

Other information
- Website: www.gmgschools.org

GMG Community School District is a rural public school district headquartered in Green Mountain, Iowa.

The district is in Tama and Marshall counties, and it also serves Garwin and the surrounding rural areas.

== History ==
The district was established in 1987, by the merger of the Garwin and Green Mountain school districts.

== Schools ==
The district operates two schools:

- GMG Elementary School, Green Mountain
- GMG Secondary School, Garwin

== Operations ==
The district entered into an agreement with multiple school districts to share employees; districts may share employees as a way of saving money. For example the GMG and BCLUW school districts share a superintendent, with the occupant working for BCLUW 60% of the time and GMG 40% of the time. Ben Petty, previously the principal of BCLUW High School, became the shared superintendent of GMG and BCLUW in 2011. By 2014, the GMG, BCLUW, and Hubbard–Radcliffe districts shared a single elementary guidance counselor, the GMG, BCLUW, North Tama, and Gladbrook–Reinbeck districts shared a single director of curriculum and innovation, and GMG and BCLUW had a single transportation director.

The district was previously headquartered in Garwin.

== GMG Secondary School ==
=== Athletics ===
The Wolverines compete in the Iowa Star Conference, including the following sports:

- Cross country
- Volleyball
- Football
  - 1987 Class A state champions
- Basketball
- Wrestling
- Track and field
- Golf
- Soccer
- Baseball
- Softball

== See also ==
- List of school districts in Iowa
- List of high schools in Iowa
