= Waterloo Christian School =

Private secondary school in Waterloo, Iowa, United States

Coordinates: 42.468°N 92.377°W

Cedar Ridge Christian School

Location
- 1307 W. Ridgeway Ave. Waterloo, Iowa; United States

Information
- Type: Private Christian
- Established: 1973
- Administrator: Dr. Ryan Hall
- Principal: Dr. Laura Pitts
- Grades: K-12
- Enrollment: 335 (2023-2024)
- Colors: Green, White, Black, gold
- Mascot: Regent
- Affiliation: Iowa Star Conference

Waterloo Christian School is a private K-12 Christian school in Waterloo, Iowa.

== History ==
Waterloo Christian School, formerly Walnut Ridge Baptist Academy, was founded in 1973 as a ministry of Walnut Ridge Baptist Church. Church members wanted a place for their children to be educated from a Biblical perspective. The graduating class of 1988 were the first students to complete all grades from kindergarten through 12th grade. In 2025, the name of the school was changed to Cedar Ridge Christian School. The location also shifted in 2025 from the town of Waterloo to the neighboring town of Cedar Falls.

== See also ==
- List of high schools in Iowa
