= Beaman, Iowa =

- City
- Location of Beaman, Iowa
- Coordinates: 42°13′13″N 92°49′20″W
- Country: United States
- State: Iowa
- County: Grundy

Area
  - Total: 0.19 sq mi (0.50 km^{2})
  - Land: 0.19 sq mi (0.48 km^{2})
  - Water: 0.0077 sq mi (0.02 km^{2})
- Elevation: 1,004 ft (306 m)

Population (2020)
  - Total: 161
  - Density: 862.8/sq mi (333.11/km^{2})
- Time zone: UTC-6 (Central (CST))
  - Summer (DST): UTC-5 (CDT)
- ZIP code: 50609
- Area code: 641
- FIPS code: 19-05140
- GNIS feature ID: 2394094
- Website: cityofbeaman.org

Beaman is a city in Grundy County, Iowa, United States. The population was 161 at the 2020 census. It is part of the Waterloo−Cedar Falls Metropolitan Statistical Area.

== History ==
Beaman was originally called Wadiloupe. The present name is for H. H. Beaman, the original owner of the town site.

A post office was established as Wadiloup in 1867, renamed Beaman in 1875, and remains in operation.

== Demographics ==
Historical populations
Year	Pop.	±%
1880	201	—
1890	262	+30.3%
1900	266	+1.5%
1910	220	−17.3%
1920	214	−2.7%
1930	183	−14.5%
1940	167	−8.7%
1950	191	+14.4%
1960	247	+29.3%
1970	222	−10.1%
1980	219	−1.4%
1990	183	−16.4%
2000	210	+14.8%
2010	191	−9.0%
2020	161	−15.7%
Source:"U.S. Census website". United States Census Bureau. and Iowa Data Center; Source: U.S. Decennial Census

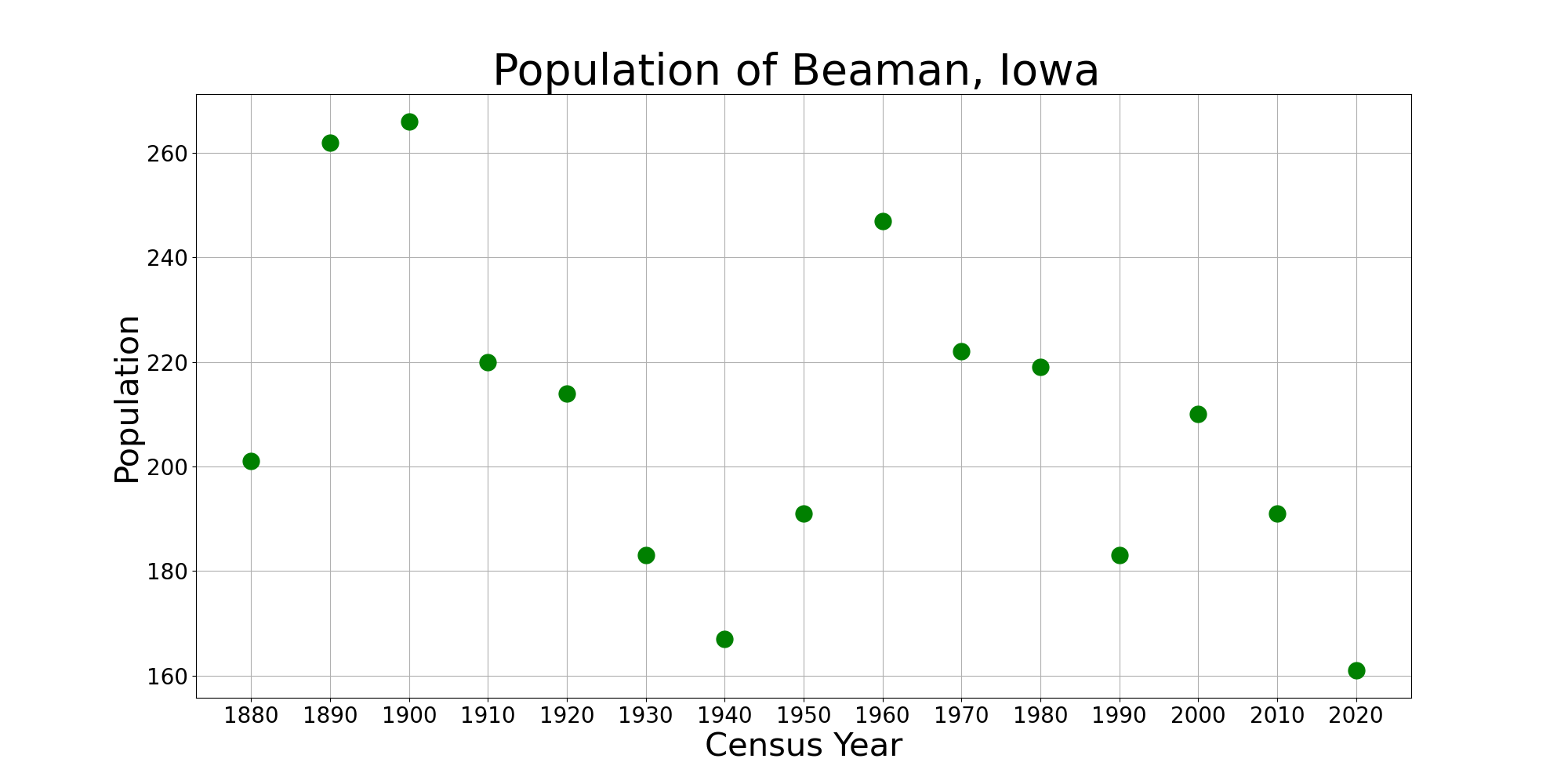
The population of Beaman, Iowa from US census data

=== 2020 census ===
As of the census of 2020, there were 161 people, 72 households, and 42 families residing in the city. The population density was 862.7 inhabitants per square mile (333.1/km^{2}). There were 78 housing units at an average density of 418.0 per square mile (161.4/km^{2}). The racial makeup of the city was 96.3% White, 0.0% Black or African American, 0.6% Native American, 0.0% Asian, 0.0% Pacific Islander, 0.0% from other races and 3.1% from two or more races. Hispanic or Latino persons of any race comprised 2.5% of the population.

Of the 72 households, 30.6% of which had children under the age of 18 living with them, 50.0% were married couples living together, 11.1% were cohabitating couples, 18.1% had a female householder with no spouse or partner present and 20.8% had a male householder with no spouse or partner present. 41.7% of all households were non-families. 30.6% of all households were made up of individuals, 8.3% had someone living alone who was 65 years old or older.

The median age in the city was 48.4 years. 23.0% of the residents were under the age of 20; 5.0% were between the ages of 20 and 24; 18.6% were from 25 and 44; 33.5% were from 45 and 64; and 19.9% were 65 years of age or older. The gender makeup of the city was 49.7% male and 50.3% female.

=== 2010 census ===
As of the census of 2010, there were 191 people, 78 households, and 50 families residing in the city. The population density was 1,005.3 inhabitants per square mile (388.1/km^{2}). There were 85 housing units at an average density of 447.4 per square mile (172.7/km^{2}). The racial makeup of the city was 96.9% White, 0.5% Asian, 2.1% Pacific Islander, and 0.5% from two or more races. Hispanic or Latino of any race were 1.0% of the population.

There were 78 households, of which 35.9% had children under the age of 18 living with them, 44.9% were married couples living together, 7.7% had a female householder with no husband present, 11.5% had a male householder with no wife present, and 35.9% were non-families. 29.5% of all households were made up of individuals, and 9% had someone living alone who was 65 years of age or older. The average household size was 2.45 and the average family size was 2.98.

The median age in the city was 38.3 years. 30.4% of residents were under the age of 18; 5.2% were between the ages of 18 and 24; 22.1% were from 25 to 44; 29.9% were from 45 to 64; and 12.6% were 65 years of age or older. The gender makeup of the city was 53.9% male and 46.1% female.

=== 2000 census ===
As of the census of 2000, there were 210 people, 86 households, and 58 families residing in the city. The population density was 1,138.0 inhabitants per square mile (439.4/km^{2}). There were 88 housing units at an average density of 476.9 per square mile (184.1/km^{2}). The racial makeup of the city was 99.52% White and 0.48% Native American.

There were 86 households, out of which 33.7% had children under the age of 18 living with them, 54.7% were married couples living together, 8.1% had a female householder with no husband present, and 31.4% were non-families. 26.7% of all households were made up of individuals, and 8.1% had someone living alone who was 65 years of age or older. The average household size was 2.44 and the average family size was 2.93.

In the city, the population was spread out, with 29.0% under the age of 18, 8.1% from 18 to 24, 29.5% from 25 to 44, 17.1% from 45 to 64, and 16.2% who were 65 years of age or older. The median age was 36 years. For every 100 females, there were 103.9 males. For every 100 females age 18 and over, there were 106.9 males.

The median income for a household in the city was $45,750, and the median income for a family was $46,500. Males had a median income of $31,964 versus $21,042 for females. The per capita income for the city was $18,960. None of the families and 0.5% of the population were living below the poverty line.

== Geography ==
According to the United States Census Bureau, the city has a total area of 0.20 square miles (0.52 km^{2}), of which 0.19 square miles (0.49 km^{2}) is land and 0.01 square miles (0.03 km^{2}) is water.

=== Climate ===
Designated as having a humid continental climate, this region typically has a large seasonal temperature differences, with warm to hot (and often humid) summers and cold (sometimes severely cold) winters. Precipitation is relatively well distributed year-round in many areas with this climate. The Köppen Climate Classification subtype for this climate is "Dfa". (Hot Summer Continental Climate).

Climate data for Beaman, Iowa
Month	Jan	Feb	Mar	Apr	May	Jun	Jul	Aug	Sep	Oct	Nov	Dec	Year
Mean daily maximum °C (°F)	−3 (27)	−1 (31)	7 (44)	16 (60)	22 (71)	27 (80)	29 (85)	28 (82)	24 (75)	17 (63)	8 (46)	−1 (31)	14 (58)
Mean daily minimum °C (°F)	−13 (8)	−11 (12)	−4 (24)	2 (36)	8 (47)	14 (58)	17 (62)	15 (59)	11 (51)	4 (39)	−3 (26)	−10 (14)	3 (36)
Average precipitation mm (inches)	25 (1.0)	25 (1.0)	51 (2.0)	81 (3.2)	110 (4.2)	120 (4.8)	100 (4.1)	99 (3.9)	89 (3.5)	64 (2.5)	46 (1.8)	30 (1.2)	840 (33.2)
Average precipitation days	5	5	7	9	11	10	8	8	8	7	6	5	89
Source: Weatherbase

== Government and infrastructure ==
The city maintains its own fire department, with a fire station built in 1990. The Grundy County Sheriff's Department provides law enforcement services under contract to Beaman. Emergency Medical Services (EMS) are provided both by the Beaman Conrad Emergency Response Team, a volunteer first responder service housed in the nearby city of Conrad's fire department, and the Marshalltown Area Paramedic Service which is stationed in Marshalltown.

== Education ==
BCLUW Community School District operates public schools serving Beaman. The schools are BCLUW Elementary School in Conrad, BCLUW Middle School in Union, and BCLUW High School in Conrad.

The Beaman-Conrad-Lipscomb school district served Beaman until July 1, 1992, when it merged into BCLUW.

The city operates the Beaman Community Memorial Library. The library includes the Beaman Heritage Center, which serves as a community museum.

== Parks and recreation ==
The Beaman City Park is located in the city's downtown. The Beaman Gym serves as a recreational space; the city government had purchased it from the school district in the 1980s. The Beaman Memorial Hall serves as a meeting space for area organizations. The Beaman Arboretum in eastern Beaman serves as a nature area; it has 5 acres (2.0 ha) of space. The Tennis Court Park includes a facility that serves as a basketball and tennis court in warmer months and an ice skating rink in the winter.

The Wolf Creek Recreation Area, 1.5 miles (2.4 km) southeast of Beaman, is the largest park located in Grundy County.
