= Riceville Community School District =

Public school district in Riceville, Iowa, United States

Coordinates: 43.354664°N 92.553042°W

Location
- Riceville, Iowa Howard and Mitchell counties United States
- Coordinates: 43.354664, -92.553042

District information
- Type: Local school district
- Grades: K-12
- Superintendent: Barb Schwamman
- Schools: 2
- Budget: $6,765,000 (2017-18)
- NCES District ID: 1924150

Students and staff
- Students: 406 (2022-23)
- Teachers: 34.54 FTE
- Staff: 38.00 FTE
- Student–teacher ratio: 11.75
- Athletic conference: Iowa Star
- District mascot: Wildcats
- Colors: Red and Black

Other information
- Website: www.riceville.k12.ia.us

The Riceville Community School District is a rural public school district serving the town of Riceville and surrounding areas in eastern Mitchell County and western Howard County.

The school, which serves all grade levels PreK-12 in one building, is located at 912 Woodlawn in Riceville.

Barb Schwamann has been the superintendent since 2017, while also serving as superintendent for Osage Community School District. She was nominated for the 2019-20 Iowa Superintendent of the Year award.

The school's mascot is the Wildcats. Their colors are red and black.

== Schools ==
- Riceville Elementary School
- Riceville High School

== Riceville High School ==
=== Athletics ===
The Wildcats compete in the Iowa Star Conference, including the following sports:

- Cross County (boys and girls)
- Volleyball
- Football
  - 1993 Class A State Champions
- Basketball (boys and girls)
- Wrestling
  - 1994 Class 1A State Champions
  - 1994 Class 1A State Duals Champions
- Track and Field (boys and girls)
- Golf (boys and girls)
- Baseball
- Softball

== See also ==
- List of school districts in Iowa
- List of high schools in Iowa
