= Clutier, Iowa =

- City
- Location of Clutier, Iowa
- Coordinates: 42°04′46″N 92°24′13″W
- Country: United States
- State: Iowa
- County: Tama

Area
  - Total: 0.75 sq mi (1.94 km^{2})
  - Land: 0.75 sq mi (1.94 km^{2})
  - Water: 0 sq mi (0.00 km^{2})
- Elevation: 873 ft (266 m)

Population (2020)
  - Total: 213
  - Density: 284.0/sq mi (109.67/km^{2})
- Time zone: UTC-6 (Central (CST))
  - Summer (DST): UTC-5 (CDT)
- ZIP code: 52217
- Area code: 319
- FIPS code: 19-14655
- GNIS feature ID: 2393576

Clutier (/ˈkluːtɪər/) is a city in Tama County, Iowa, United States. The population was 213 at the 2020 census.

== History ==
A post office called Clutier has been in operation since 1900. The city was named for B. F. Clutier.

== Geography ==
According to the United States Census Bureau, the city has a total area of 0.76 square miles (1.97 km^{2}), all land.

== Demographics ==
Historical populations
Year	Pop.	±%
1910	186	—
1920	299	+60.8%
1930	350	+17.1%
1940	354	+1.1%
1950	302	−14.7%
1960	292	−3.3%
1970	275	−5.8%
1980	249	−9.5%
1990	219	−12.0%
2000	229	+4.6%
2010	213	−7.0%
2020	213	+0.0%
Source:"U.S. Census website". United States Census Bureau. and Iowa Data Center; Source: U.S. Decennial Census

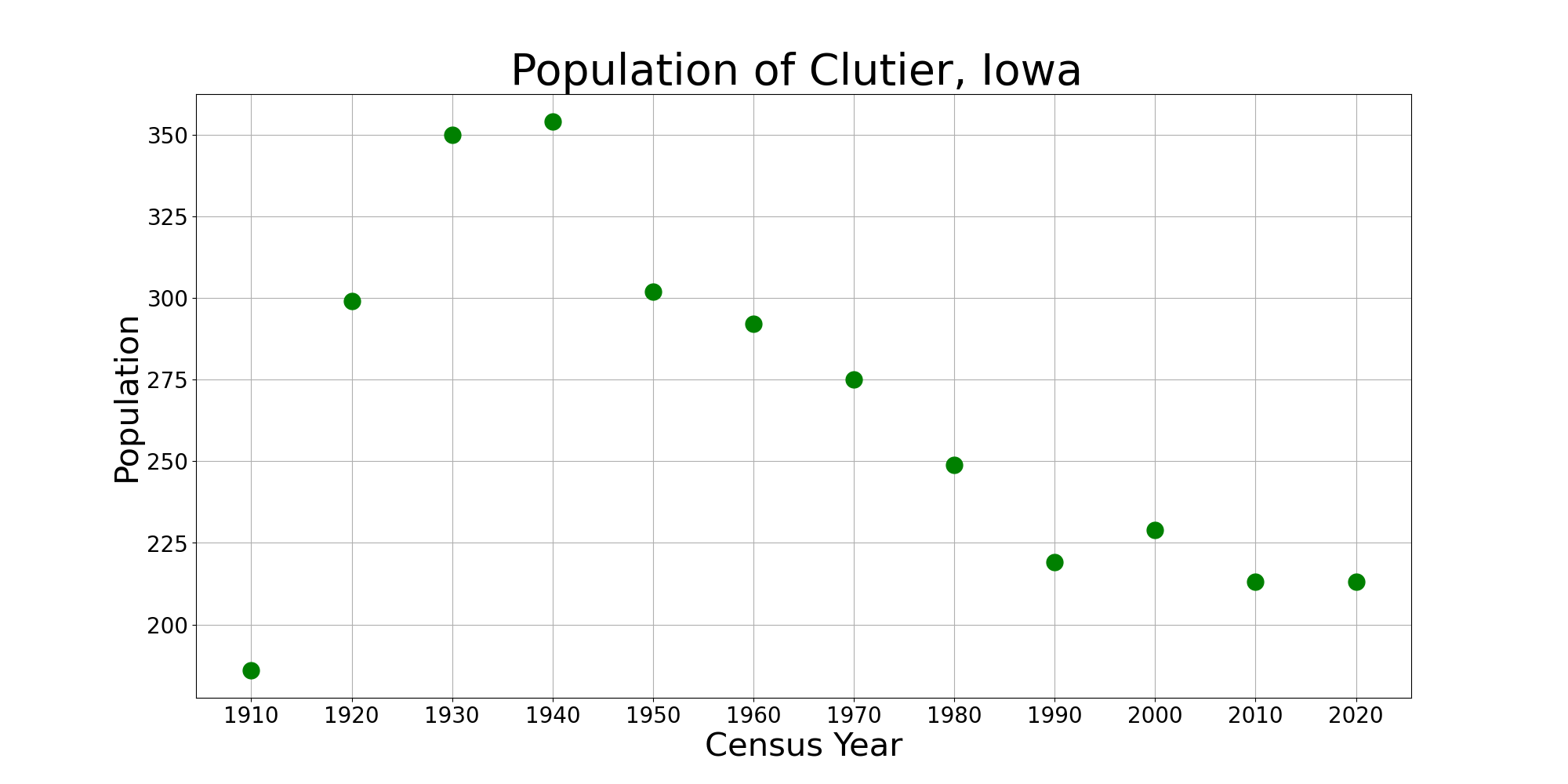
The population of Clutier, Iowa from US census data

=== 2020 census ===
As of the census of 2020, there were 213 people, 87 households, and 54 families residing in the city. The population density was 284.0 inhabitants per square mile (109.7/km^{2}). There were 108 housing units at an average density of 144.0 per square mile (55.6/km^{2}). The racial makeup of the city was 88.7% White, 0.5% Black or African American, 0.5% Native American, 1.9% Asian, 0.0% Pacific Islander, 0.9% from other races and 7.5% from two or more races. Hispanic or Latino persons of any race comprised 1.9% of the population.

Of the 87 households, 25.3% of which had children under the age of 18 living with them, 46.0% were married couples living together, 10.3% were cohabitating couples, 24.1% had a female householder with no spouse or partner present and 19.5% had a male householder with no spouse or partner present. 37.9% of all households were non-families. 31.0% of all households were made up of individuals, 14.9% had someone living alone who was 65 years old or older.

The median age in the city was 39.5 years. 26.8% of the residents were under the age of 20; 7.0% were between the ages of 20 and 24; 18.8% were from 25 and 44; 26.8% were from 45 and 64; and 20.7% were 65 years of age or older. The gender makeup of the city was 53.1% male and 46.9% female.

=== 2010 census ===
As of the census of 2010, there were 213 people, 95 households, and 49 families living in the city. The population density was 280.3 inhabitants per square mile (108.2/km^{2}). There were 121 housing units at an average density of 159.2 per square mile (61.5/km^{2}). The racial makeup of the city was 92.5% White, 0.5% Native American, 4.7% from other races, and 2.3% from two or more races. Hispanic or Latino of any race were 8.9% of the population.

There were 95 households, of which 29.5% had children under the age of 18 living with them, 37.9% were married couples living together, 6.3% had a female householder with no husband present, 7.4% had a male householder with no wife present, and 48.4% were non-families. 43.2% of all households were made up of individuals, and 23.1% had someone living alone who was 65 years of age or older. The average household size was 2.24 and the average family size was 3.10.

The median age in the city was 41.8 years. 27.7% of residents were under the age of 18; 5.2% were between the ages of 18 and 24; 22.6% were from 25 to 44; 25.4% were from 45 to 64; and 19.2% were 65 years of age or older. The gender makeup of the city was 47.4% male and 52.6% female.

=== 2000 census ===
As of the census of 2000, there were 229 people, 109 households, and 58 families living in the city. The population density was 300.4 inhabitants per square mile (116.0/km^{2}). There were 124 housing units at an average density of 162.7 per square mile (62.8/km^{2}). The racial makeup of the city was 97.82% White, 1.75% Native American, and 0.44% from two or more races.

There were 109 households, out of which 22.0% had children under the age of 18 living with them, 49.5% were married couples living together, 3.7% had a female householder with no husband present, and 45.9% were non-families. 42.2% of all households were made up of individuals, and 23.9% had someone living alone who was 65 years of age or older. The average household size was 2.10 and the average family size was 2.92.

In the city, the population was spread out, with 21.0% under the age of 18, 3.5% from 18 to 24, 26.2% from 25 to 44, 17.9% from 45 to 64, and 31.4% who were 65 years of age or older. The median age was 44 years. For every 100 females, there were 87.7 males. For every 100 females age 18 and over, there were 84.7 males.

The median income for a household in the city was $27,344, and the median income for a family was $39,583. Males had a median income of $28,000 versus $24,375 for females. The per capita income for the city was $14,092. About 11.9% of families and 12.6% of the population were below the poverty line, including 16.4% of those under the age of eighteen and 7.0% of those 65 or over.

== Education ==
Clutier is within the North Tama County Community School District.
