= Meskwaki Settlement School =

Public school in Tama, Iowa, United States

Location
- Tama, Iowa Tama County United States
- Coordinates: 41.992802°N 92.647790°W

District information
- Type: Bureau of Indian Education Tribal School
- Grades: K–12
- Established: 1980
- Superintendent: Willie Barney
- Schools: 1
- Budget: Not available
- NCES District ID: 5900196

Students and staff
- Students: 292 (2023–2024)
- Student–teacher ratio: 5.96
- Athletic conference: Iowa Star Conference
- District mascot: Warriors
- Colors: Red and Green

Other information
- Website: msswarriors.org

Meskwaki Settlement School (MSS) is a tribally controlled school with oversight by the Bureau of Indian Education, is located in the Meskwaki Nation, also known as the Meskwaki Settlement. It is in unincorporated Tama County, Iowa, about 4 miles (6.4 km) west of Tama, and is a property of the Sac and Fox Tribe of the Mississippi in Iowa.

== History ==
The Sac and Fox Settlement School was originally established as a Day School by the Bureau of Indian Affairs. The school then became part of the South Tama County Community School District, and then closed in 1972. After application by the tribal members to the Bureau of Indian Education, the school re-opened in 1980 as a tribally operated school.

== Athletics ==
The Warriors compete in the Iowa Star Conference in the following sports:

- Cross Country (boys and girls)
- Volleyball
- Football
- Basketball (boys and girls)
- Bowling
- Wrestling
- Swimming
- Track and Field (boys and girls)
- Tennis
- Soccer (boys and girls)
- Golf (boys and girls)
- Baseball
- Softball

== See also ==
- Meskwaki
- Meskwaki Settlement, Iowa
- List of school districts in Iowa
- List of high schools in Iowa
