= Baxter Community School District =

Public school district in Baxter, Iowa, United States

Coordinates: 41.826711°N 93.148968°W

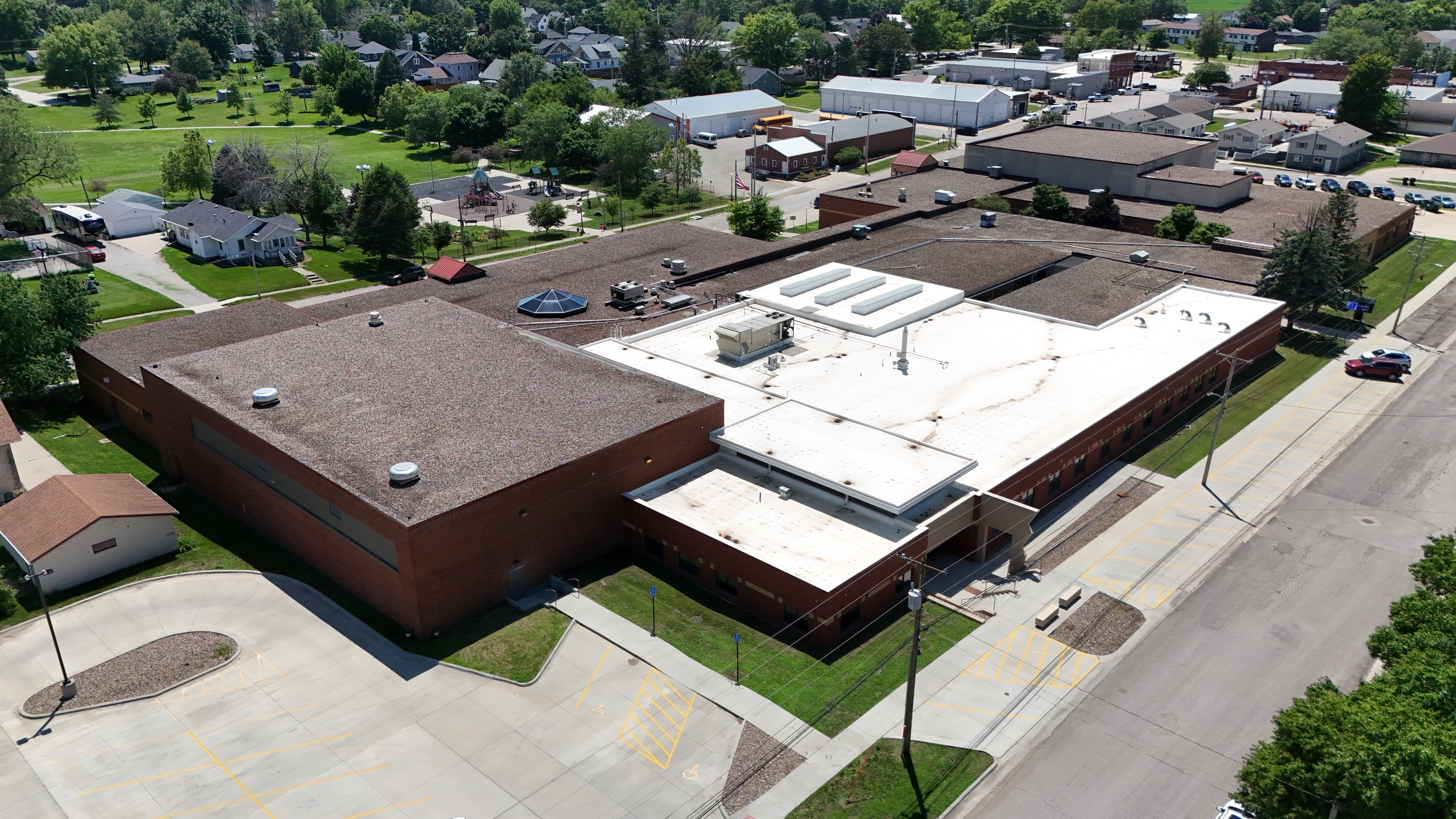
- Baxter Community School pictured in 2025

Location
- Baxter, Iowa Jasper and Marshall counties United States
- Coordinates: 41.826711, -93.148968

District information
- Type: Local school district
- Grades: K-12
- Superintendent: Dr. Mickalyn Clapper
- Schools: 2
- Budget: $6,648,000 (2020-21)
- NCES District ID: 1904380

Students and staff
- Students: 486 (2022-23)
- Teachers: 36.12 FTE
- Staff: 25.78 FTE
- Student–teacher ratio: 13.46
- Athletic conference: Iowa Star
- District mascot: Bolts
- Colors: Purple, Silver and Black

Other information
- Website: www.baxtercsd.com/district

The Baxter Community School District, or Baxter Community School, is a rural public school district serving the town of Baxter and surrounding areas in northern Jasper County, and a small area of southern Marshall County.

The school, which serves all grade levels PreK-12 in one building, is located at 202 E State Street in Baxter.

The school's mascot is the Bolts. Their colors are purple, silver and black.

== History ==
In 1910, the Baxter school district had 15 teachers and an enrollment of 140.

== Schools ==
- Baxter Elementary School
- Baxter High School

== Baxter High School ==
=== Athletics ===
In the 1988–1989 school year, Baxter and Collins-Maxwell agreed to a sports sharing agreement, they competed as the Collins-Maxwell Baxter Raiders. The agreement lasted 29 years before its discontinuation in 2017.

The Bolts compete in the Iowa Star Conference, including the following sports: The Baxter mascot was previously the Bulldogs, but changed in 2016–17.

- Cross Country (boys and girls)
- Volleyball
- Football
- Basketball (boys and girls)
- Wrestling(boys and girls)
- Track and Field (boys and girls)
- Golf (boys and girls)
- Soccer (boys and girls)
- Baseball
- Softball. (Note as of 2026 8th may play in high school sports)

== See also ==
- List of school districts in Iowa
- List of high schools in Iowa
