= Janesville Consolidated Community School District =

School district in Janesville, Iowa, United States

Coordinates: 42.649782°N 92.459486°W

Location
- Janesville, Iowa Black Hawk and Bremer counties United States
- Coordinates: 42.649782, -92.459486

District information
- Type: Local school district
- Grades: PK-12
- Superintendent: B.J. Meaney
- Schools: 2
- Budget: $7,216,000 (2020-21)
- NCES District ID: 1915180

Students and staff
- Students: 504 (2022-23)
- Teachers: 31.15 FTE
- Staff: 33.55 FTE
- Student–teacher ratio: 16.18
- Athletic conference: Iowa Star
- District mascot: Wildcats
- Colors: Yellow and Black

Other information
- Website: www.janesville.k12.ia.us

Janesville Consolidated Community School District (JCSD) is a rural public school district operating a single Pre-Kindergarten through 12th grade public school in Janesville, Iowa.

Brian J. "BJ" Meaney is currently the superintendent of schools and has been since he began the 2013–14 school year as superintendent after being hired in April 2013 by the Janesville school board.

It occupies portions of Black Hawk and Bremer counties, including the town of Janesville.

== Schools ==
The district operates two schools in a single facility in Janesville:

- Janesville Elementary School
- Janesville Junior-Senior High School

=== Janesville High School ===
==== Athletics ====
The Wildcats compete in the Iowa Star Conference, including the following sports:

- Cross County
- Volleyball
  - 5-time Class 1A State Champions (2013, 2015, 2016, 2017, 2018)
- Football
- Basketball
- Track and Field
- Baseball
- Softball
- Wrestling

Janesville students can also participate in soccer and dance with Waverly-Shell Rock.

The Janesville volleyball program won the 1A State Volleyball Championship in the state of Iowa for four consecutive years from 2015 to 2018. They also won the state championship in 2013. The program qualified for the state tournament for a streak of nine years, spanning from 2010 through the 2018 season.

== Enrollment ==
View source data.

== See also ==
- List of school districts in Iowa
- List of high schools in Iowa
