= Tripoli Community School District =

Public school district in Tripoli, Iowa, United States

Coordinates: 42.800848°N 92.260379°W

Location
- Tripoli, Iowa Bremer and Chickasaw counties United States
- Coordinates: 42.800848, -92.260379

District information
- Type: Local school district
- Grades: K-12
- Superintendent: Jay Marley
- Schools: 2
- Budget: $6,857,000 (2020-21)
- NCES District ID: 1928050

Students and staff
- Students: 389 (2022-23)
- Teachers: 36.36 FTE
- Staff: 37.35 FTE
- Student–teacher ratio: 11.00
- Athletic conference: Iowa Star
- District mascot: Panthers
- Colors: Orange and Black

Other information
- Website: www.tripoli.k12.ia.us

The Tripoli Community School District is a rural public school district serving the town of Tripoli and surrounding areas in Bremer County, including the town of Frederika, and a small section in southern Chickasaw County.

Jay Marley serves as the superintendent for the Tripoli school district. The school's mascot is the Panthers. Their colors are orange and black.

== Schools ==
The district operates two schools, both located in Tripoli:

- Tripoli Elementary School
- Tripoli Middle/Sr High School

== Tripoli High School ==
=== Athletics ===
The Panthers compete in the Iowa Star Conference, including the following sports:

- Cross County (boys and girls)
- Volleyball
  - 11-time Class 1A State Champions (1999, 2000, 2001, 2003, 2004, 2005, 2008, 2009, 2010, 2011, 2012)
- Football
- Basketball (boys and girls)
- Wrestling
  - 2-time Class 2A State Champions - 2010, 2012 (as Denver-Tripoli)
  - 2010 Class 2A State Duals Champions (as Denver-Tripoli)
- Track and Field (boys and girls)
- Golf (boys and girls)
  - Boys' 1986 Class 2A State Champions
- Baseball
- Softball

== See also ==
- List of school districts in Iowa
- List of high schools in Iowa
