= Collins–Maxwell Community School District =

Public school district in Maxwell, Iowa, United States

Coordinates: 41.890678°N 93.397365°W

Location
- Maxwell, Iowa Story, Jasper, Marshall, and Polk counties United States
- Coordinates: 41.890678, -93.397365

District information
- Type: Local school district
- Grades: K–12
- Established: 1983
- Superintendent: Mark Snavely
- Schools: 2
- Budget: $7,156,000 (2020-21)
- NCES District ID: 1907900

Students and staff
- Students: 412 (2022-23)
- Teachers: 37.03 FTE
- Staff: 30.18 FTE
- Student–teacher ratio: 11.13
- Athletic conference: Iowa Star Conference
- District mascot: Spartans
- Colors: Black, blue and silver

Other information
- Website: cmspartans.org

Collins–Maxwell Community School District (C-M) is a rural public school district headquartered in Maxwell, Iowa. It operates Collins–Maxwell Elementary School and Collins–Maxwell Middle School-High School, located in Collins and Maxwell, respectively.

The district occupies portions of Story, Jasper, Marshall, and Polk counties. The district serves Collins, Maxwell, and the surrounding rural areas.

== History ==
The district formed on July 1, 1983, as a merger of the former Collins Community and Maxwell Community School districts.school districts.

On July 1, 2019, Corey Lunn became the district's superintendent.

== Schools ==
- Collins–Maxwell Elementary
- Collins–Maxwell Middle School-High School

== Collins–Maxwell High School ==
=== Athletics ===
In the 1988–1989 school year, Collins-Maxwell and Baxter agreed to a sports sharing agreement, they were the Collins-Maxwell Baxter Raiders. The agreement lasted 29 years before its discontinuation in 2017.

The Spartans compete in the Iowa Star Conference, including the following sports:

- Cross county (boys and girls)
- Volleyball
- Football
- Basketball (boys and girls)
- Wrestling
- Track and field (boys and girls)
- Golf (boys and girls)
- Soccer (boys and girls)
- Baseball
- Softball - 2018 and 2019 Class 1A State Champions

== See also ==
- List of school districts in Iowa
- List of high schools in Iowa
