= Clinton High School and Public Library =

Historic structure in Iowa, United States

- U.S. National Register of Historic Places
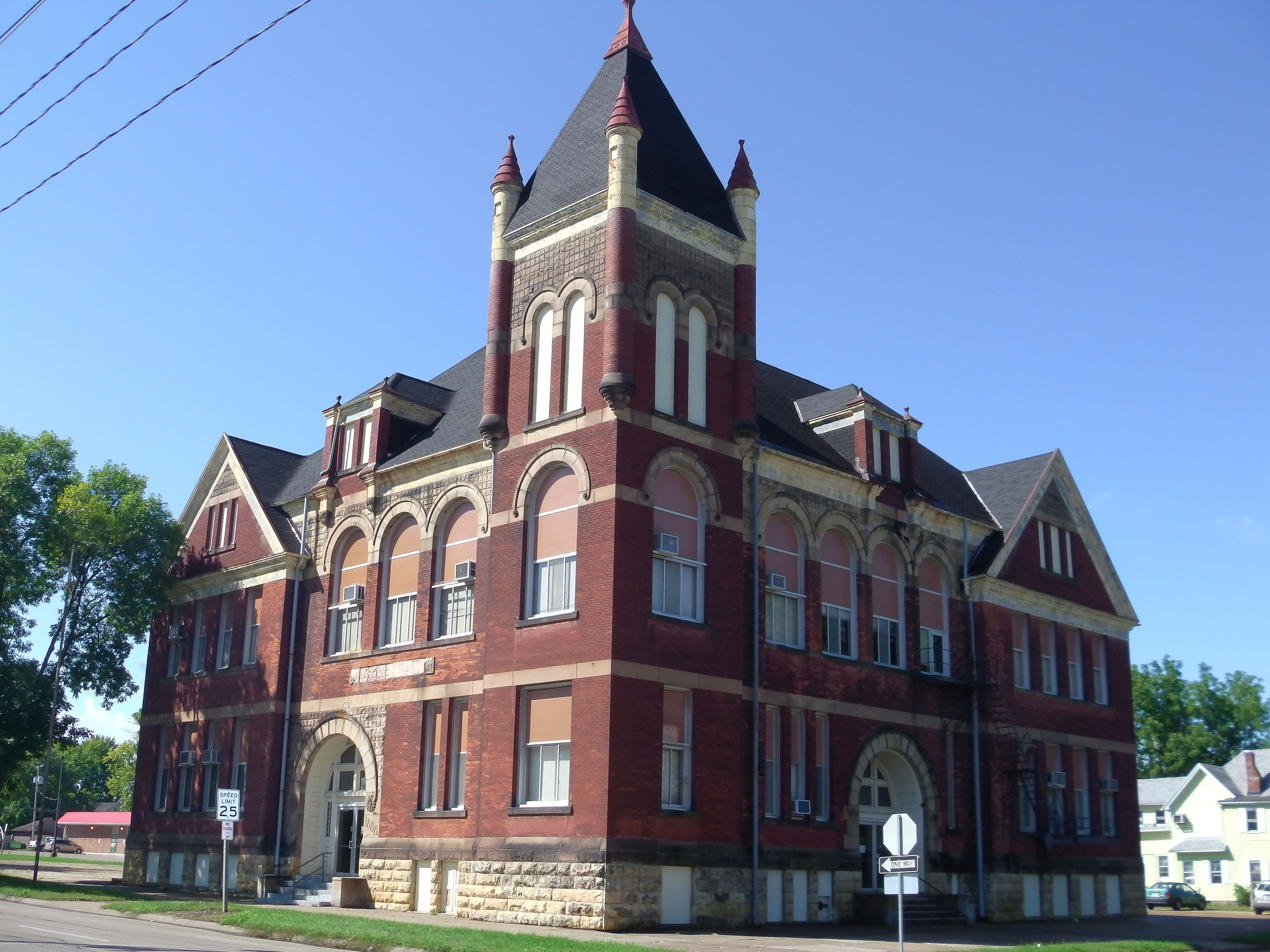

- Location within Iowa Location within the United States
- Location: 600 S. 4th St. Clinton, Iowa
- Coordinates: 41°50′24″N 90°11′36″W
- Built: 1888-1889
- Architect: Josiah L. Rice
- Architectural style: Romanesque Revival
- MPS: Clinton, Iowa MPS
- NRHP reference No.: 12000792
- Added to NRHP: September 19, 2012

Clinton High School and Public Library, also known as Roosevelt School, is an historic structure located in Clinton, Iowa, United States. It was listed on the National Register of Historic Places in 2012.

== History ==
Clinton architect Josiah L. Rice designed the building in the Romanesque Revival style. The building housed Clinton High School from 1889 until 1922. It also served as the Clinton Public Library until 1904. After a new high school was built, the building became the office of the superintendent and Roosevelt Elementary School and served that purpose until 1974. The Clinton Community School District used the building as its administration center until they moved out in 2013. The building has been turned into 16 apartments, 12 of which are income-restricted and four are market-rate. Community Housing Initiatives of Spencer, Iowa, was responsible for the $4.8 million project that was completed in October 2016.

== Architecture ==
The former school building is a 2½-story brick structure built on a stone foundation. Stone was also used for the window sills, string courses, arches and trim. Previous to its 2016 renovation, smaller windows with infill panels had replaced the original windows. The window openings above the roof cornice line were boarded up. All the windows in the building have been reopened to their original forms. The steel fire escape on the north wall was also a later addition. The interior featured open stairwells and wood wainscoting.
