= Maxwell, Iowa =

- City
- Motto: Settle in for the good life
- Location of Maxwell, Iowa
- Coordinates: 41°53′29″N 93°23′46″W
- Country: United States
- State: Iowa
- County: Story

Area
  - Total: 1.09 sq mi (2.83 km^{2})
  - Land: 1.09 sq mi (2.83 km^{2})
  - Water: 0 sq mi (0.00 km^{2})
- Elevation: 896 ft (273 m)

Population (2020)
  - Total: 859
  - Density: 786.7/sq mi (303.75/km^{2})
- Time zone: UTC-6 (Central (CST))
  - Summer (DST): UTC-5 (CDT)
- ZIP code: 50161
- Area code: 515
- FIPS code: 19-50520
- GNIS feature ID: 2395048
- Website: www.welcometomaxwell.com

Maxwell is a city in Story County, Iowa, United States. The population was 859 at the time of the 2020 census. It is part of the Ames, Iowa Metropolitan Statistical Area, which is a part of the larger Ames-Boone, Iowa Combined Statistical Area.

== History ==
When the Chicago, Milwaukee, and Saint Paul railways made the decision to come to the junction of the Calamus and Indian Creek valleys, the people began moving to the railroad. J. W. Maxwell and F. M. Baldwin had purchased some land near the railroad, and gave the land upon which the first town of Maxwell was platted. The town was after the donor and because he was the first to move there. Soon, large buildings were moved from Iowa Center and Peoria City to what is now the site of the town of Maxwell. The first building was the railroad depot. Several new buildings were constructed, the largest of which was occupied by the Mercantile firm of Maxwell and Baldwin and is now occupied by Logsdon's Grocery Store.

Because of the excessive wet season and heavy snow of the winter of 1881–1882, there was a considerable flood. Both creeks, surrounding the town, were out of their banks and formed one solid body of water just south of the depot, marooning many of the construction gangs who made their headquarters that winter in Maxwell. Because they could not work on account of the interference of the water, two saloons sprang up and did a flourishing business.

Before the close of 1882, there were twelve or more business houses in town, and more under construction. By 1887, there were 40 businesses located in Maxwell.

Maxwell became incorporated in 1883, and a town election was held. The town hall was located behind the Maxwell Baldwin building. It had a cupola with a bell to ring in case of emergencies. The first church met at the lumber yard owned by J. O. French. Planks were arranged as seats. Later, the Methodist and Presbyterian churches were built.

== Geography ==
According to the United States Census Bureau, the city has a total area of 1.11 square miles (2.87 km^{2}), all land.

== Demographics ==
Historical populations
Year	Pop.	±%
1890	453	—
1900	810	+78.8%
1910	754	−6.9%
1920	811	+7.6%
1930	721	−11.1%
1940	812	+12.6%
1950	802	−1.2%
1960	773	−3.6%
1970	758	−1.9%
1980	783	+3.3%
1990	788	+0.6%
2000	807	+2.4%
2010	920	+14.0%
2020	859	−6.6%
Source:"U.S. Census website". United States Census Bureau. and Iowa Data Center; Source: U.S. Decennial Census

=== 2020 census ===
As of the census of 2020, there were 859 people, 356 households, and 230 families residing in the city. The population density was 786.7 inhabitants per square mile (303.8/km^{2}). There were 375 housing units at an average density of 343.4 per square mile (132.6/km^{2}). The racial makeup of the city was 92.4% White, 0.0% Black or African American, 0.3% Native American, 0.3% Asian, 0.0% Pacific Islander, 1.5% from other races and 5.4% from two or more races. Hispanic or Latino persons of any race comprised 2.4% of the population.

Of the 356 households, 26.7% of which had children under the age of 18 living with them, 52.0% were married couples living together, 9.6% were cohabitating couples, 16.0% had a female householder with no spouse or partner present and 22.5% had a male householder with no spouse or partner present. 35.4% of all households were non-families. 27.8% of all households were made up of individuals, 9.8% had someone living alone who was 65 years old or older.

The median age in the city was 36.5 years. 25.8% of the residents were under the age of 20; 5.7% were between the ages of 20 and 24; 27.6% were from 25 and 44; 25.6% were from 45 and 64; and 15.3% were 65 years of age or older. The gender makeup of the city was 51.8% male and 48.2% female.

=== 2010 census ===
As of the census of 2010, there were 920 people, 349 households, and 242 families living in the city. The population density was 828.8 inhabitants per square mile (320.0/km^{2}). There were 365 housing units at an average density of 328.8 per square mile (127.0/km^{2}). The racial makeup of the city was 98.6% White, 0.3% African American, 0.2% Native American, 0.4% Asian, and 0.4% from two or more races. Hispanic or Latino people of any race were 0.4% of the population.

There were 349 households, of which 36.7% had children under the age of 18 living with them, 56.4% were married couples living together, 8.6% had a female householder with no husband present, 4.3% had a male householder with no wife present, and 30.7% were non-families. 24.6% of all households were made up of individuals, and 12% had someone living alone who was 65 years of age or older. The average household size was 2.64 and the average family size was 3.19.

The median age in the city was 35.4 years. 28.5% of residents were under the age of 18; 8.4% were between the ages of 18 and 24; 27.5% were from 25 to 44; 23.5% were from 45 to 64; and 12.1% were 65 years of age or older. The gender makeup of the city was 50.9% male and 49.1% female.

=== 2000 census ===
As of the census of 2000, there were 807 people, 312 households, and 228 families living in the city. The population density was 703.9 inhabitants per square mile (271.8/km^{2}). There were 333 housing units at an average density of 290.5 per square mile (112.2/km^{2}). The racial makeup of the city was 98.76% White, 0.25% Native American, 0.50% Asian, and 0.50% from two or more races. Hispanic or Latino people of any race were 0.25% of the population.

There were 312 households, out of which 37.2% had children under the age of 18 living with them, 59.3% were married couples living together, 10.9% had a female householder with no husband present, and 26.9% were non-families. 24.0% of all households were made up of individuals, and 13.8% had someone living alone who was 65 years of age or older. The average household size was 2.59 and the average family size was 3.09.

In the city, the population was spread out, with 29.2% under the age of 18, 6.1% from 18 to 24, 27.9% from 25 to 44, 21.1% from 45 to 64, and 15.7% who were 65 years of age or older. The median age was 36 years. For every 100 females, there were 102.8 males. For every 100 females age 18 and over, there were 87.8 males.

The median income for a household in the city was $43,125, and the median income for a family was $49,821. Males had a median income of $35,114 versus $24,931 for females. The per capita income for the city was $19,069. About 2.6% of families and 3.9% of the population were below the poverty line, including 2.6% of those under age 18 and 4.6% of those age 65 or over.

== Museums ==
- Maxwell North Museum (military memorabilia and uniforms, quilts and coverlets, wedding and graduation dresses, Douglas Law office, 1930's kitchen, complete printing shop)
- Maxwell South Museum (millinery shop, school room, church, post office, barber shop, rocks, fossils, and geodes)

== Education ==
The Collins–Maxwell Community School District serves the community. The district formed on July 1, 1983, as a merger of the Collins and Maxwell school districts.

The district has 475 enrolled students and 81 staff members, the latter making the school district the town's largest employer. The school is governed by a 5 person board of education, and day-to-day operations are carried out by the Superintendent and Elementary Principal.

Sports teams in the district are known as the Spartans and are part of the Iowa Star Conference along with Clarksville, Don Bosco, Dunkerton, Janesville, Riceville, Tripoli, Waterloo Christian, Baxter, Colo-NESCO, GMG, Meskwaki, North Tama and Valley Lutheran. In addition to athletics the district also offers FFA, Dance Team, Fine Arts, Yearbook committee, Champs, National Honor Society, and Cheerleading.

== Sports and recreation ==
The city of Maxwell is home to three city parks. The Maxwell City Park is located on the west side of the town along the Indian Creek. It is the location for the yearly Old Settlers event. There are softball/baseball fields, a disc golf course, playground equipment, plumbed restroom building, RV camping lots with hookups, five shelter houses - one with a full kitchen, horseshoe pit, sand volleyball area, the Story County Freedom Rock and Army Tank display. The Legion Park is located in the southeast quadrant of the city and contains the city soccer fields. On the south side of the park there is a baseball and softball field, concession stand and restrooms. This is also the Maxwell location of the Heartland Bike Trail. The final city park was built and is maintained by the Boy Scouts, and is known as the Scout Park. This is located near the Legion Park and has playground equipment, an open shelter and tables.

The Collins–Maxwell–Baxter soccer club's league supports 5U and above age groups. This league is a subdivision of the Central Iowa Soccer League and Iowa Soccer.
