= Washington Township Center High School =

- U.S. National Register of Historic Places
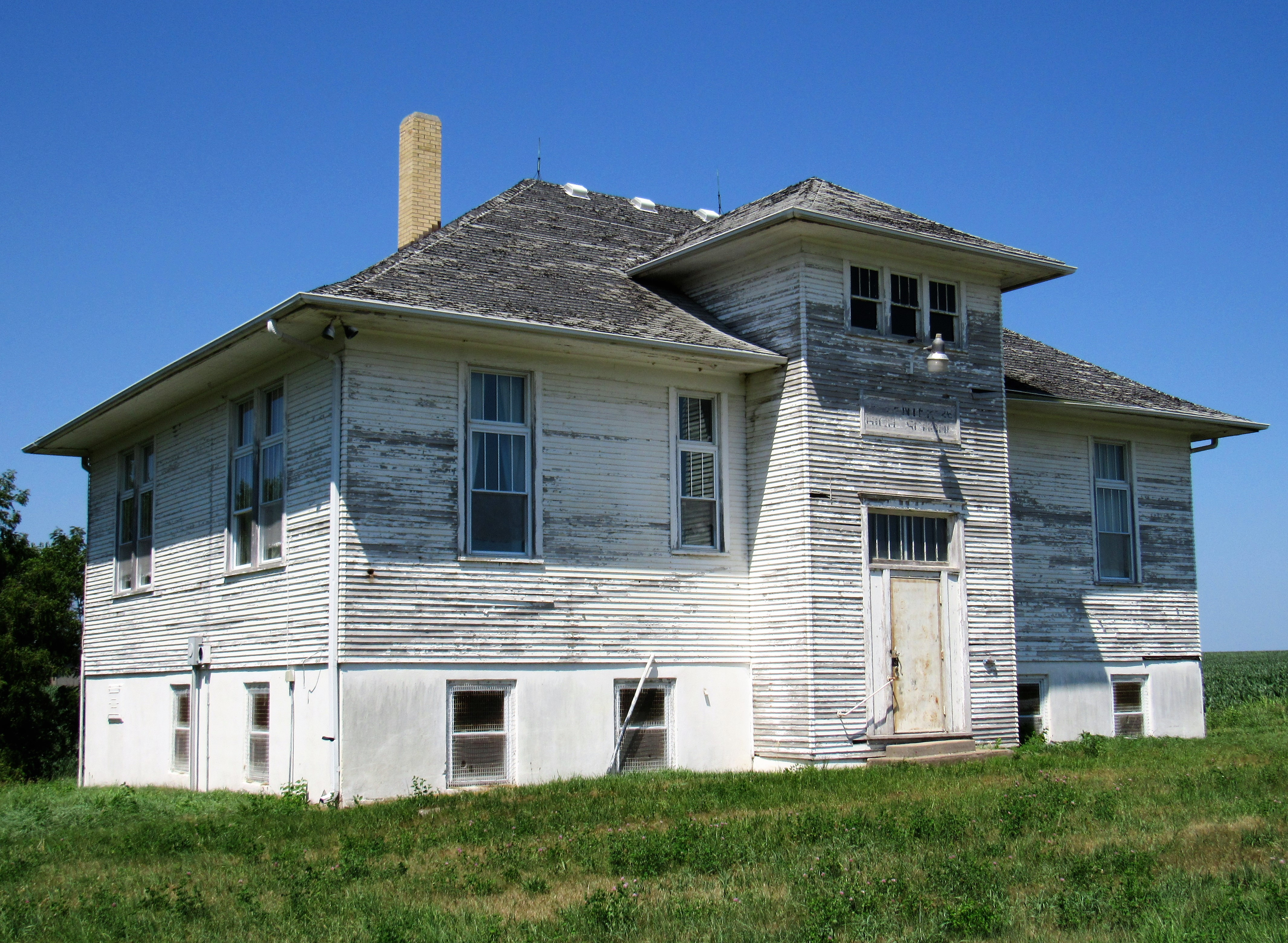

- Location within Iowa Location within the United States
- Location: Northeast of Amish
- Coordinates: 41°33′19.8″N 91°46′13.2″W
- Area: 1 acre (0.40 ha)
- Built: 1926
- NRHP reference No.: 79000903
- Added to NRHP: December 15, 1979

Washington Township Center High School, also known as the Washington Township Community Center, is a historic building located northeast of Amish, Iowa, United States. Built in 1926, this public institution was both a throw-back to the 19th-century and forward-looking at the same time. It was a throwback in that the school was financed and maintained by way of donations and tuition paid by township residents instead of taxes. It was forward-looking in that the rural people of this area recognized the need for education beyond the traditional eight grades. Because of the poor roads in the area and rural people's distrust of urban areas, where Iowa's high schools were generally located at the time, the citizens of Washington Township chose to build a high school across the road from the elementary school. It closed in 1945, and the building continued in use as a polling place. In 1952 it became the meeting place for the local 4-H chapter. A corporation was established in 1960 to maintain the building as a community building for public functions. It was listed on the National Register of Historic Places in 1979.
