= Charles City Junior-Senior High School =

- U.S. National Register of Historic Places
- Location within Iowa Location within the United States
- Location: 3500 N. Grand Ave. Charles City, Iowa
- Coordinates: 43°04′04.6″N 92°40′19.5″W
- Built: 1932
- NRHP reference No.: 100001567
- Added to NRHP: September 5, 2017

Charles City Junior-Senior High School, also known as the North Grand Building, is a historic building located in Charles City, Iowa, United States. It replaced a high school building completed in 1899 that was destroyed in a fire. The portion of the present building along Grand Avenue was built from 1931 to 1932, and served as the community's high school into the late 1960s when the current high school building was completed. This building then became a junior high school and then a middle school. A large addition was built onto the rear of the building in 1970. They vacated part of this building when the new middle school opened in 2016. The older section of the building was listed on the National Register of Historic Places in 2017. It is slated to be converted into 35 market-rate apartments. The newer section of the building continues to house the school district's offices; Iowa BIG North, an initiative based learning program that works with local business partners; and the Carrie Lane Alternative High School. The school's auditorium continues to be used for some school and community events.
