= North Tama County Community School District =

Public school district in Traer, Iowa, United States

Coordinates: 41.662855°N 92.018800°W

Location
- Traer, Iowa Tama County United States
- Coordinates: 41.662855, -92.018800

District information
- Type: Local school district
- Grades: K-12
- Superintendent: David Hill
- Schools: 2
- Budget: $7,284,000 (2020-21)
- NCES District ID: 1921000

Students and staff
- Students: 476 (2022-23)
- Teachers: 45.49 FTE
- Staff: 43.82 FTE
- Student–teacher ratio: 10.46
- Athletic conference: Iowa Star
- District mascot: Redhawks
- Colors: Red and White

Other information
- Website: www.n-tama.k12.ia.us

North Tama County Community School District (NT) is a rural public school district headquartered in Traer, Iowa. It has an elementary school and a secondary school. Its schools are North Tama Elementary School and North Tama Junior-Senior High School.

The district is entirely in Tama County. In addition to Traer it serves the municipality of Clutier, as well as the unincorporated areas of Buckingham and Dinsdale.

== Campus ==
In fall 1996, a new addition to the school building was scheduled to open. A second edition of the school including a new gym entrance and junior high wing of the school opened in 2009. One part of the facility was an approximately 50-seat kindergarten area, but was recently modified to become the Pre-School area. The name is the Ernest A. Herink Pre-School Center.

== North Tama High School ==
=== Athletics ===
North Tama is considered in the class A for football and class 1A in all other sports. North Tama is in the Iowa Star Conference. North Tama is also part of the Iowa High School Esports Association since the Spring of 2020.

- Football-2010 State Champions.
- North Tama Girls' Cross Country - 5-time State Champions (1979, 1981, 1982, 2004, and 2005)
- North Tama Girls' Track and Field - 7-time State Champions (1979, 1980, 1981, 2006, 2007, 2008, 2009)

=== Activities ===
Started by Levitticus "Boomer" Luwu, the high school began a tech team club in 2019. The school also has clubs for FFA, FCCLA, NHS, Student Council, Art Club, Spanish Club, Band, Chorus, and Speech.

== See also ==
- List of school districts in Iowa
- List of high schools in Iowa
