= Tripoli, Iowa =

City in the United States

- City
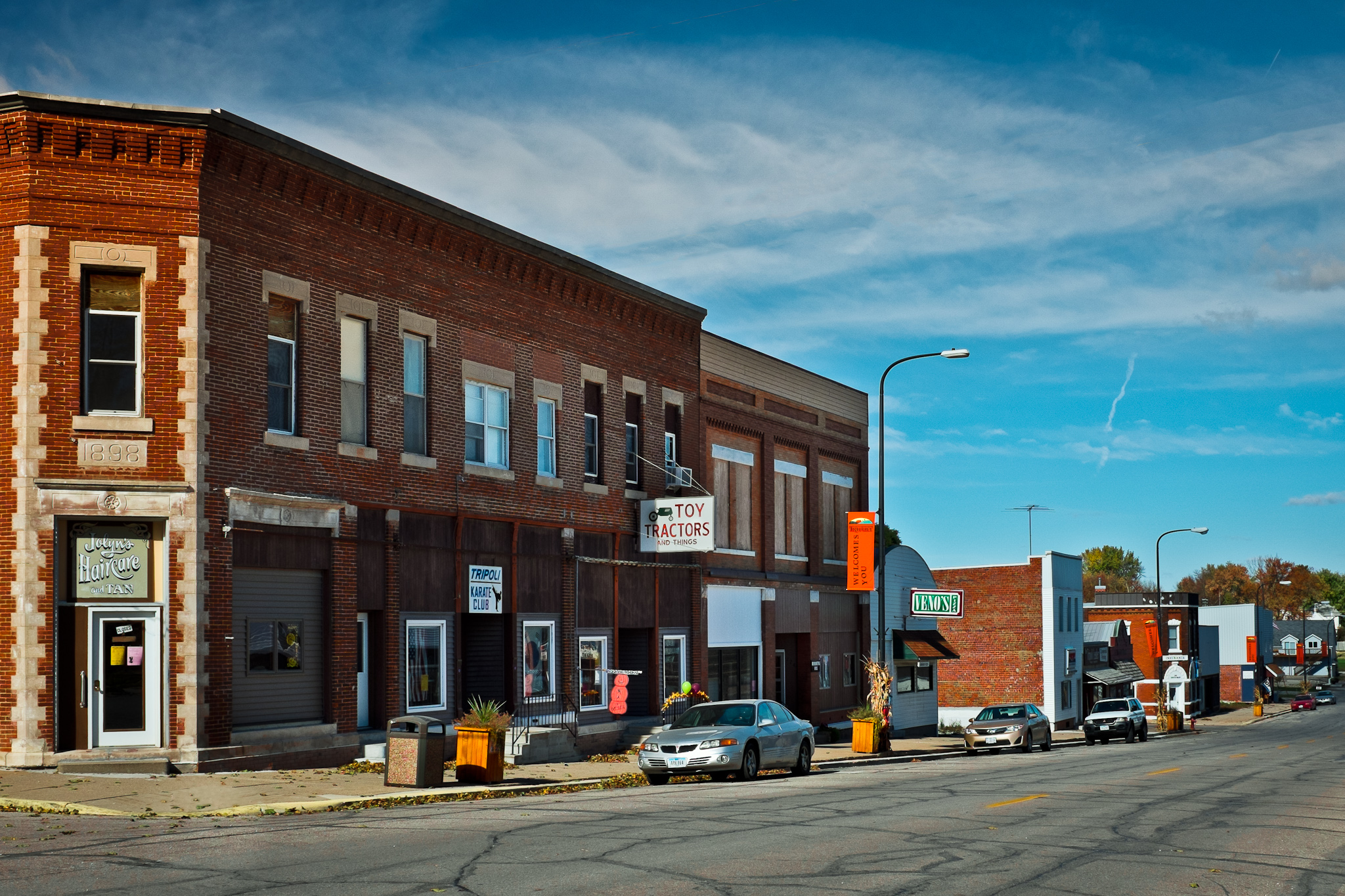
- Downtown Tripoli

- Location of Tripoli, Iowa
- Coordinates: 42°48′18″N 92°15′02″W
- Country: United States
- State: Iowa
- County: Bremer
- Incorporated: October 16, 1894

Area
  - Total: 1.39 sq mi (3.60 km^{2})
  - Land: 1.39 sq mi (3.60 km^{2})
  - Water: 0 sq mi (0.00 km^{2})
- Elevation: 1,024 ft (312 m)

Population (2020)
  - Total: 1,191
  - Density: 855.8/sq mi (330.44/km^{2})
- Time zone: UTC−6 (Central (CST))
  - Summer (DST): UTC−5 (CDT)
- ZIP Code: 50676
- Area code: 319
- FIPS code: 19-78915
- GNIS feature ID: 2397056
- Website: www.tripoliiowa.com

Tripoli (/trɪˈpoʊlə/ tri-POH-lə) is a city in Bremer County, Iowa, United States. The population was 1,191 at the time of the 2020 census. It is part of the Waterloo–Cedar Falls Metropolitan Statistical Area. The Tripoli Post Office opened in 1860.

== Geography ==
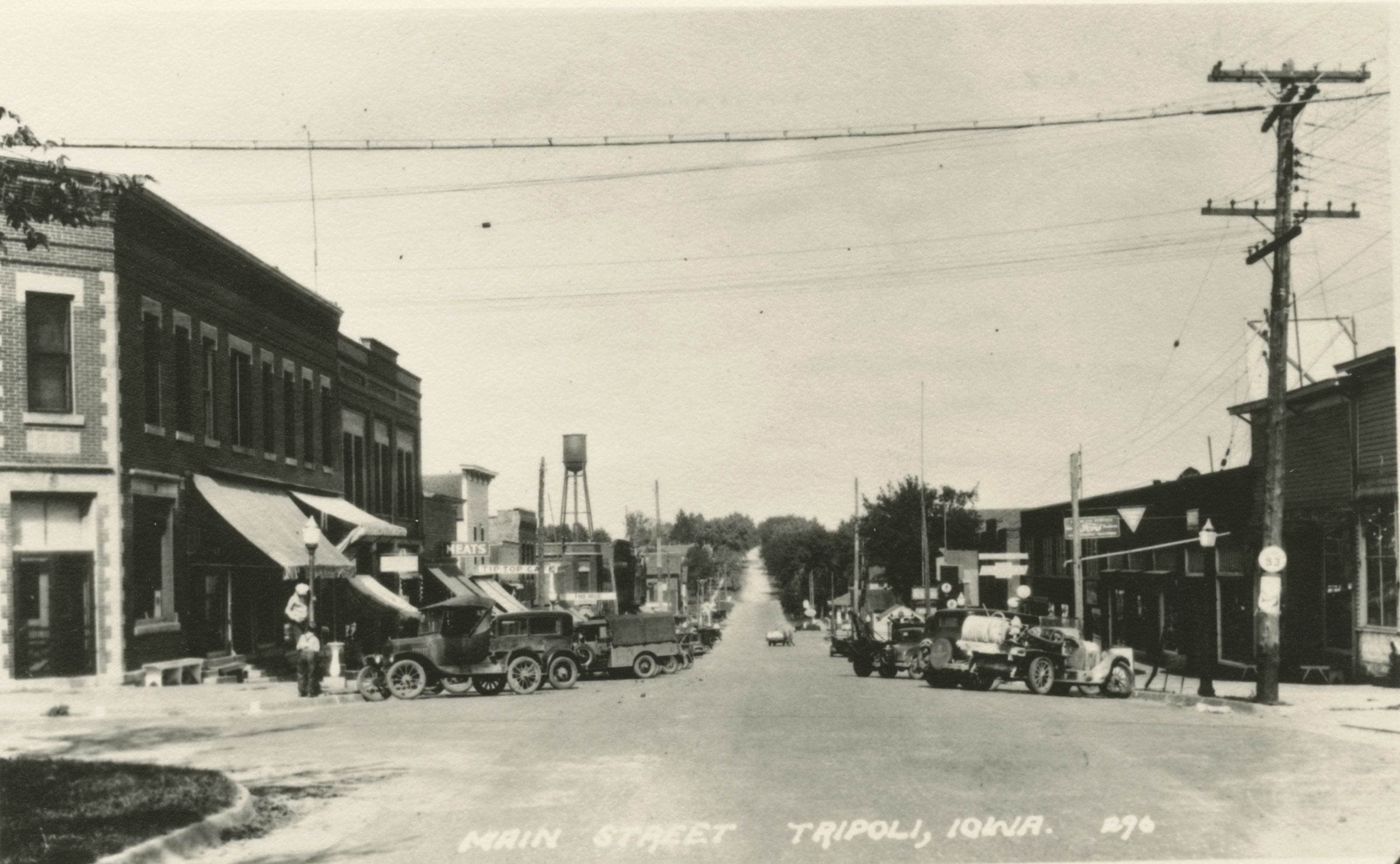
Mainstreet, 1920

According to the United States Census Bureau, the city has a total area of 1.41 square miles (3.65 km^{2}), all land.

=== Climate ===
According to the Köppen Climate Classification system, Tripoli has a hot-summer humid continental climate, abbreviated "Dfa" on climate maps.

Climate data for Tripoli, Iowa, 1991–2020 normals, extremes 1946–present
Month	Jan	Feb	Mar	Apr	May	Jun	Jul	Aug	Sep	Oct	Nov	Dec	Year
Record high °F (°C)	62 (17)	68 (20)	84 (29)	96 (36)	96 (36)	102 (39)	101 (38)	104 (40)	98 (37)	93 (34)	79 (26)	65 (18)	104 (40)
Mean maximum °F (°C)	44.7 (7.1)	49.7 (9.8)	68.1 (20.1)	79.7 (26.5)	87.0 (30.6)	92.3 (33.5)	92.8 (33.8)	90.7 (32.6)	89.1 (31.7)	82.5 (28.1)	65.9 (18.8)	49.6 (9.8)	94.5 (34.7)
Mean daily maximum °F (°C)	24.8 (−4.0)	29.2 (−1.6)	42.8 (6.0)	57.6 (14.2)	70.0 (21.1)	79.6 (26.4)	82.8 (28.2)	80.9 (27.2)	74.5 (23.6)	61.0 (16.1)	44.3 (6.8)	30.9 (−0.6)	56.5 (13.6)
Daily mean °F (°C)	16.1 (−8.8)	20.3 (−6.5)	33.4 (0.8)	46.6 (8.1)	58.9 (14.9)	69.1 (20.6)	72.2 (22.3)	69.9 (21.1)	62.4 (16.9)	49.6 (9.8)	35.0 (1.7)	22.7 (−5.2)	46.4 (8.0)
Mean daily minimum °F (°C)	7.3 (−13.7)	11.5 (−11.4)	24.0 (−4.4)	35.6 (2.0)	47.9 (8.8)	58.6 (14.8)	61.6 (16.4)	59.0 (15.0)	50.3 (10.2)	38.2 (3.4)	25.6 (−3.6)	14.6 (−9.7)	36.2 (2.3)
Mean minimum °F (°C)	−15.6 (−26.4)	−10.1 (−23.4)	0.9 (−17.3)	21.3 (−5.9)	33.7 (0.9)	46.1 (7.8)	50.9 (10.5)	48.7 (9.3)	35.5 (1.9)	23.0 (−5.0)	8.3 (−13.2)	−7.6 (−22.0)	−19.2 (−28.4)
Record low °F (°C)	−32 (−36)	−32 (−36)	−27 (−33)	0 (−18)	24 (−4)	36 (2)	43 (6)	38 (3)	25 (−4)	10 (−12)	−15 (−26)	−28 (−33)	−32 (−36)
Average precipitation inches (mm)	1.23 (31)	1.09 (28)	2.00 (51)	3.93 (100)	5.11 (130)	6.03 (153)	4.80 (122)	4.29 (109)	3.75 (95)	2.96 (75)	1.98 (50)	1.47 (37)	38.64 (981)
Average snowfall inches (cm)	6.5 (17)	6.3 (16)	4.3 (11)	1.5 (3.8)	0.0 (0.0)	0.0 (0.0)	0.0 (0.0)	0.0 (0.0)	0.0 (0.0)	02 (5.1)	3.1 (7.9)	11.1 (28)	33.0 (84)
Average precipitation days (≥ 0.01 in)	7.4	6.7	8.4	10.5	12.2	11.6	8.8	9.0	8.7	8.5	6.8	7.4	106
Average snowy days (≥ 0.1 in)	4.6	3.9	2.0	0.9	0.0	0.0	0.0	0.0	0.0	0.1	1.7	5.7	18.9
Source 1: NOAA (average snowfall/snow days 1981–2010)
Source 2: National Weather Service

== Demographics ==
Historical Populations
Year	Pop.	±%
1880	65	—
1900	655	+907.7%
1910	755	+15.3%
1920	914	+21.1%
1930	891	−2.5%
1940	1,001	+12.3%
1950	1,124	+12.3%
1960	1,179	+4.9%
1970	1,345	+14.1%
1980	1,280	−4.8%
1990	1,188	−7.2%
2000	1,310	+10.3%
2010	1,313	+0.2%
2020	1,191	−9.3%
Sources: Source: U.S. Decennial Census

=== 2020 census ===
As of the 2020 census, Tripoli had a population of 1,191, with 508 households and 323 families. The median age was 41.2 years. 22.3% of residents were under the age of 18, and 24.5% were under the age of 20. In addition, 6.6% were between the ages of 20 and 24, 23.3% were from 25 to 44, 24.6% were from 45 to 64, and 20.9% were 65 years of age or older. For every 100 females there were 99.8 males, and for every 100 females age 18 and over there were 96.6 males age 18 and over.

0.0% of residents lived in urban areas, while 100.0% lived in rural areas.

There were 508 households, of which 26.8% had children under the age of 18 living in them. Of all households, 50.6% were married-couple households, 9.1% were cohabiting-couple households, 18.1% were households with a male householder and no spouse or partner present, and 22.2% were households with a female householder and no spouse or partner present. About 36.4% of households were non-families, while 30.1% of all households were made up of individuals and 17.1% had someone living alone who was 65 years of age or older.

There were 554 housing units, of which 8.3% were vacant. The population density was 855.8 inhabitants per square mile (330.4/km^{2}) and there were 398.1 housing units per square mile (153.7/km^{2}). The homeowner vacancy rate was 2.3% and the rental vacancy rate was 7.4%.

Racial composition as of the 2020 census
Race	Number	Percent
White	1,136	95.4%
Black or African American	0	0.0%
American Indian and Alaska Native	1	0.1%
Asian	0	0.0%
Native Hawaiian and Other Pacific Islander	0	0.0%
Some other race	11	0.9%
Two or more races	43	3.6%
Hispanic or Latino (of any race)	15	1.3%

=== 2010 census ===
As of the census of 2010, there were 1,313 people, 540 households, and 356 families living in the city. The population density was 931.2 inhabitants per square mile (359.5/km^{2}). There were 568 housing units at an average density of 402.8 per square mile (155.5/km^{2}). The racial makeup of the city was 98.2% White, 0.2% African American, 0.3% Asian, 0.5% from other races, and 0.8% from two or more races. Hispanic or Latino of any race were 1.1% of the population.

There were 540 households, of which 33.3% had children under the age of 18 living with them, 51.1% were married couples living together, 10.7% had a female householder with no husband present, 4.1% had a male householder with no wife present, and 34.1% were non-families. Of all households 31.3% were made up of individuals, and 14.4% had someone living alone who was 65 years of age or older. The average household size was 2.37 and the average family size was 2.95.

The median age in the city was 40.5 years. 26% of residents were under the age of 18; 6.8% were between the ages of 18 and 24; 22.8% were from 25 to 44; 25.1% were from 45 to 64; and 19.3% were 65 years of age or older. The gender makeup of the city was 47.0% male and 53.0% female.

=== 2000 census ===
As of the census of 2000, there were 1,310 people, 537 households, and 361 families living in the city. The population density was 934.7 inhabitants per square mile (360.9/km^{2}). There were 561 housing units at an average density of 400.3 per square mile (154.6/km^{2}). The racial makeup of the city was 98.78% White, 0.15% African American, 0.08% Native American, 0.08% Asian, 0.08% from other races, and 0.84% from two or more races. Hispanic or Latino of any race were 0.23% of the population.

There were 537 households, out of which 31.5% had children under the age of 18 living with them, 53.6% were married couples living together, 8.6% had a female householder with no husband present, and 32.6% were non-families. Of all households 30.5% were made up of individuals, and 17.1% had someone living alone who was 65 years of age or older. The average household size was 2.38 and the average family size was 2.96.

27.1% were under the age of 18, 6.5% from 18 to 24, 25.6% from 25 to 44, 20.5% from 45 to 64, and 20.3% were 65 years of age or older. The median age was 39 years. For every 100 females, there were 90.7 males. For every 100 females age 18 and over, there were 84.0 males.

The median income for a household in the city was $34,444, and the median income for a family was $42,647. Males had a median income of $30,764 versus $22,353 for females. The per capita income for the city was $16,882. About 7.3% of families and 9.6% of the population were below the poverty line, including 13.6% of those under age 18 and 13.2% of those age 65 or over.

== Education ==
The Tripoli Community School District operates local public schools.
