= Garwin, Iowa =

- City
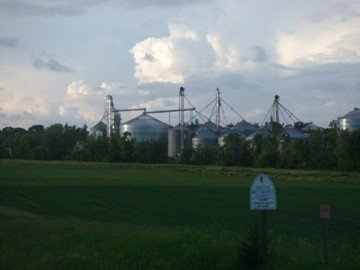
- Looking into Garwin from the south

- Location of Garwin, Iowa
- Coordinates: 42°05′37″N 92°40′45″W
- Country: United States
- State: Iowa
- County: Tama

Area
  - Total: 1.01 sq mi (2.61 km^{2})
  - Land: 1.01 sq mi (2.61 km^{2})
  - Water: 0 sq mi (0.00 km^{2})
- Elevation: 899 ft (274 m)

Population (2020)
  - Total: 481
  - Density: 477.5/sq mi (184.36/km^{2})
- Time zone: UTC-6 (Central (CST))
  - Summer (DST): UTC-5 (CDT)
- ZIP code: 50632
- Area code: 641
- FIPS code: 19-30045
- GNIS feature ID: 2394862
- Website: garwiniowa.gov

Garwin is a city in Tama County, Iowa, United States. The population was 481 at the time of the 2020 census.

== History ==
Garwin was platted in 1880. A post office called Garwin has been in operation since 1880.

In 1879, the Toledo and Northwestern Railroad was sold to the Chicago and Northwestern Railroad. After the sale, the railroad line was extended northwestward from Toledo. Various new towns were established along the tracks, but Garwin, Iowa, was the first railroad station beyond Toledo.

Giving the town a name proved to be a difficult process. At first, it was called “Maple,” or as some claim “Myrcle,” but neither name was particularly favorable. The next choice was “Marvin,” in honor of Marvin Hewitt, an official of the Northwestern railroad, but it was soon discovered that another town had already taken the name.

Several landowners, including George Rider and John Galvizer, wanted to sell their lands to establish the new town. After much controversy, these two men won out, and a message was sent to Toledo that read: “‘G’ (for Glavizer) and ‘R’ (for Rider) win.” Its recipients misconstrued the message, reading “Garwin” instead- and the city finally had a name.

== Geography ==
According to the United States Census Bureau, the city has a total area of 1.01 square miles (2.62 km^{2}), all land.

== Demographics ==
Historical populations
| Year | Pop. | ±% |
|---|---|---|
| 1880 | 99 | — |
| 1890 | 98 | −1.0% |
| 1900 | 470 | +379.6% |
| 1910 | 425 | −9.6% |
| 1920 | 587 | +38.1% |
| 1930 | 450 | −23.3% |
| 1940 | 517 | +14.9% |
| 1950 | 518 | +0.2% |
| 1960 | 546 | +5.4% |
| 1970 | 563 | +3.1% |
| 1980 | 626 | +11.2% |
| 1990 | 533 | −14.9% |
| 2000 | 565 | +6.0% |
| 2010 | 527 | −6.7% |
| 2020 | 481 | −8.7% |
Source:"U.S. Census website". United States Census Bureau. and Iowa Data Center; Source: U.S. Decennial Census

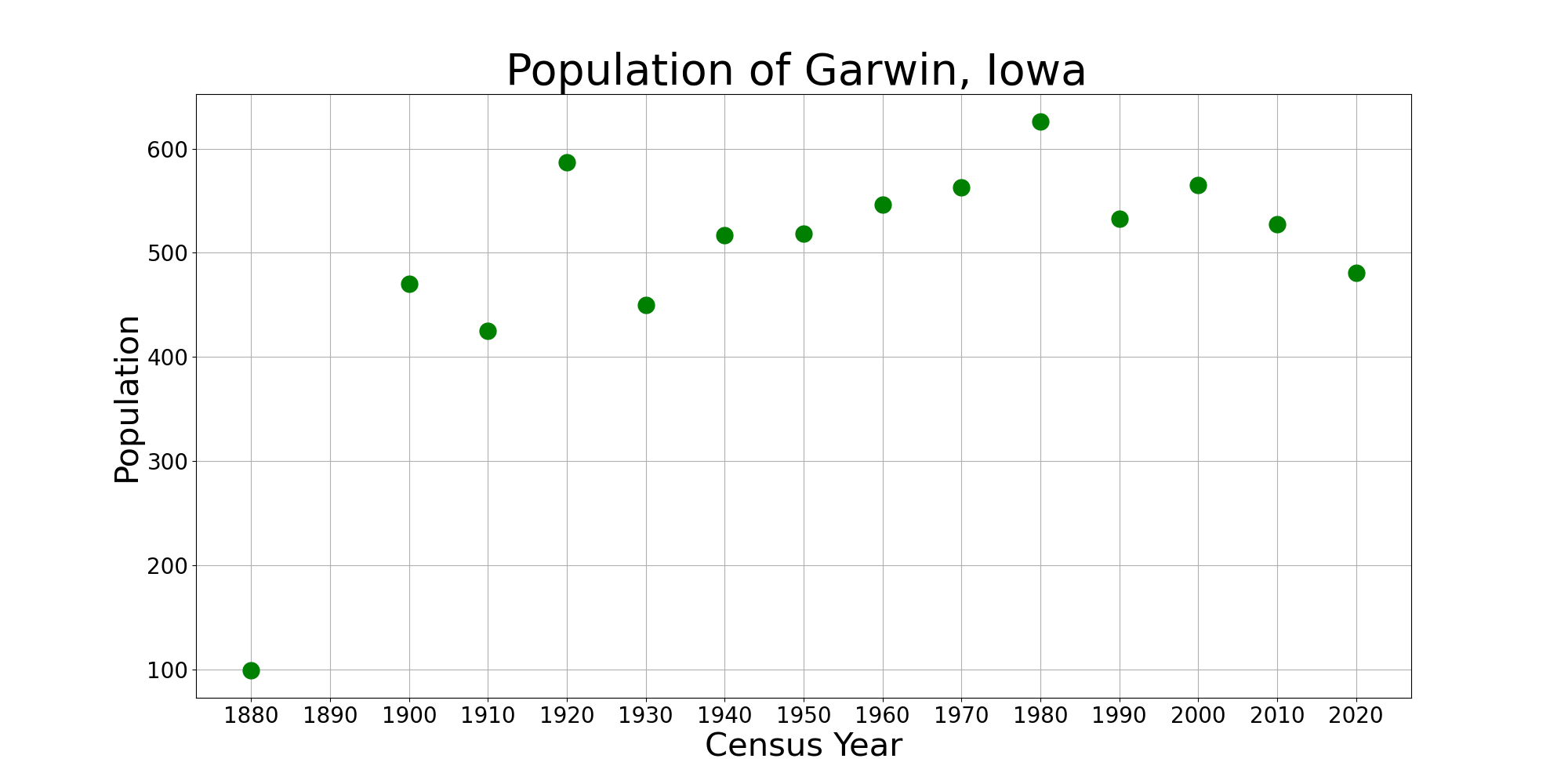
The population of Garwin, Iowa, from US census data

=== 2020 census ===
As of the 2020 census, there were 481 people, 217 households, and 136 families residing in the city. The population density was 477.5 inhabitants per square mile (184.4/km^{2}). There were 237 housing units at an average density of 235.3 per square mile (90.8/km^{2}). The racial makeup of the city was 93.6% White, 1.0% Black or African American, 2.1% Native American, 0.4% Asian, 0.0% Pacific Islander, 0.2% from other races and 2.7% from two or more races. Hispanic or Latino persons of any race comprised 3.5% of the population.

Of the 217 households, 27.6% had children under the age of 18 living with them, 41.5% were married couples living together, 10.6% were cohabitating couples, 27.2% had a female householder with no spouse or partner present, and 20.7% had a male householder with no spouse or partner present. 37.3% of all households were non-families, 32.7% were individuals, and 16.6% had someone 65 or older living alone.

The median age in the city was 43.8 years. 23.7% of the residents were under 20; 6.4% were between 20 and 24; 22.2% were between 25 and 44; 28.1% were between 45 and 64; and 19.5% were 65 or older. The gender makeup of the city was 48.0% male and 52.0% female.

=== 2010 census ===
As of the 2010 census, there were 527 people, 216 households, and 152 families residing in the city. The population density was 521.8 inhabitants per square mile (201.5/km^{2}). There were 254 housing units at an average density of 251.5 per square mile (97.1/km^{2}). The racial makeup of the city was 96.2% White, 0.6% Native American, 1.3% from other races, and 1.9% from two or more races. Hispanic or Latino of any race were 3.6% of the population.

There were 216 households, of which 33.3% had children under the age of 18 living with them, 54.6% were married couples living together, 11.6% had a female householder with no husband present, 4.2% had a male householder with no wife present, and 29.6% were non-families. 27.3% of all households comprised individuals, and 11.6% had someone 65 or older living alone. The average household size was 2.44 and the average family size was 2.93.

The median age in the city was 41.3 years. 27.5% of residents were under 18; 6.8% were between ages 18 and 24; 21.8% were from 25 to 44; 27.2% were from 45 to 64; and 16.7% were 65 or older. The gender makeup of the city was 52.2% male and 47.8% female.

=== 2000 census ===
As of the 2000 census, there were 565 people, 230 households, and 158 families residing in the city. The population density was 564.0 inhabitants per square mile (217.8/km^{2}). There were 248 housing units at an average density of 247.6 per square mile (95.6/km^{2}). The city's racial makeup was 98.58% White, 0.88% from other races, and 0.53% from two or more races. Hispanic or Latino of any race were 1.77% of the population.

There were 230 households, of which 33.9% had children under 18 living with them, 57.0% were married couples living together, 8.7% had a female householder with no husband present, and 30.9% were non-families. 26.1% of all households comprised individuals, and 13.0% had someone 65 or older living alone. The average household size was 2.46 and the average family size was 2.92.

In the city, the population was spread out, with 27.8% under 18, 6.7% from 18 to 24, 27.3% from 25 to 44, 24.6% from 45 to 64, and 13.6% who were 65 years of age or older. The median age was 36 years. For every 100 females, there were 92.8 males. For every 100 females age 18 and over, there were 88.0 males.

The median income for a household in the city was $38,269, and the median income for a family was $45,938. Males had a median income of $31,528 versus $24,250 for females. The per capita income for the city was $16,660. About 2.4% of families and 5.2% of the population were below the poverty line, including 4.4% of those under age 18 and 11.8% of those age 65 or over.

== Services and attractions ==
Garwin City Park and Legion Post

The City of Garwin provides services such as an ambulance service, a fire department, Green Mountain Garwin Junior/Senior High School, a public library, and a park.

Union Grove Park is located four miles northwest of town. The park boasts a public beach, public fishing, picnic areas, campgrounds, and short hiking trails.

== Education ==
The GMG Community School District serves the community. The district was established on July 1, 1992, by the merger of the Garwin and Green Mountain school districts.

When Garwin and Green Mountain high schools combined to form the GMG High School in 1987, they adopted the nickname 'Wolverines'. Before the consolidation, Garwin athletes were known as 'Roughriders'.

Student-athletes can now compete in football, volleyball, cross country, boys' and girls' basketball, boys' and girls' track, boys' and girls' golf, baseball, and softball. They share wrestling with East Marshall High School and swimming with Marshalltown High School.

GMG High School has 1 Iowa State High School Championship. The Wolverines claimed the 1987 Class A Iowa State Football Championship in their first year as a combined school. GMG beat Schleswig 20–17 in overtime on a Robbie Sinclair touchdown run. GMG, coached by Fred Weick, finished the 1987 season 12–0, with two overtime wins coming in the first game of the season (vs North Tama) and the '87 championship game.

GMG and Garwin HS before it also have a rich boys' basketball tradition. Garwin won many conference titles and two Iowa State Basketball Tournament runs. Garwin first made the 1978 Class 1A State Tournament, losing to Lake View-Auburn 54–44. They also made it to the 1983 Class 1A Championship Game, losing to Palmer 61–55. Garwin/GMG was long coached by Gary Peterson, who, over his 33 years as head coach, amassed a record of 478 wins and 216 losses, which ranks him 34th all-time in Iowa boys' basketball history.

GMG had a lot of success in the mid-1990s, winning back-to-back NICL West titles in boys' basketball and a district football title in 1999. Under coach Jay Freese, the 2007-08 girls' basketball team posted a record of 20-3 and made the program's first-ever regional final.

In the 2010 football season, the team became the first to go 0-10 and lose each game by at least two touchdowns. The boys' basketball team also struggled, going 3–17.

Garwin/GMG Boys' State Tournament Results
| Year | Round | Opponent | Score |
|---|---|---|---|
| 1978 | Quarterfinals | Lake View-Auburn | 44–54 |
| 1983 | Quarterfinals | Treynor | 75–47 |
| 1983 | Semifinals | Northwood-Kensett | 56–48 |
| 1983 | Class 1A Championship | Palmer | 55–61 |

== Notable resident ==
- Darwin Judge
