= Iowa High School Athletic Association =

Regulator of Iowa high school athletics

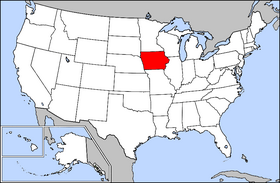
- Abbreviation: IHSAA
- Legal status: Association
- Purpose: Athletic/Educational
- Headquarters: 1605 South Story St. Boone, Iowa 50036, United States
- Region served: Iowa
- Members: 370 high schools
- Executive Director: Tom Keating
- Affiliations: National Federation of State High School Associations
- Staff: 17
- Website: iahsaa.org
- Remarks: (515) 432-2011

The Iowa High School Athletic Association (IHSAA) is the regulating body for male Iowa high school interscholastic athletics and is a full member of the National Federation of State High School Associations. Its female counterpart, the Iowa Girls High School Athletic Union (IGHSAU), is an associate member. Iowa is the only state that maintains separate governing bodies for boys' and girls' athletics.

Sports overseen by the IHSAA are baseball, basketball, bowling, cross country, football, golf, soccer, swimming & diving, tennis, track & field, and wrestling.

As classifications vary highly across sports, they are included under the individual sport section.

== Administrative staff ==
The administrative staff that runs the IHSAA consists of the 7 members in the office of directors, and the 10 members of the board of control.

=== Board of directors (as of April 2026) ===
- Executive Director- Tom Keating
- Assistant Director- Jared Chizek
- Assistant Director Chad Elsberry
- Assistant Director- Todd Tharp
- Assistant Director- Andy Umthun
- Assistant Director- Tyler Lown
- Communications Director- Chris Cuellar

=== Board of control (as of July 2024) ===
- Chairperson: Deron Durflinger, Van Meter, 2026
- Vice-chairperson: Steve Pettit, Southeast Polk, 2028
- Treasurer: Barb Schwamman, Osage & Riceville, 2027
- Amanda Whaley, West Branch, IASB, 2029
- Dr. Andy Crozier, Central Lee, 2029
- Trevor Miller, Exira-EHK & Audubon, 2028
- Brent Cook, Dubuque, Senior, 2027
- Brent Jorth, Central Lyon, 2025
- Eric St. Clair, ex-officio, Department of Education

== Member Schools ==
Number	School	Enrollment (2026-27 BEDS)
1	Valley, West Des Moines	2131
2	Johnston	1761
3	Southeast Polk, Pleasant Hill	1691
4	Linn-Mar, Marion	1688
5	Lincoln, Des Moines	1596
6	Northwest, Waukee	1691
7	Ankeny Centennial	1531
8	Roosevelt, Des Moines	1428
9	Waukee	1475
10	East, Des Moines	1333
11	Ankeny	1367
12	West, Waterloo	1252
13	Prairie, Cedar Rapids	1371
14	Cedar Falls	1302
15	Pleasant Valley, Riverdale	1328
16	City High, Iowa City	1245
17	Marshalltown	1185
18	Kennedy, Cedar Rapids	1210
19	North, Sioux City	1208
20	Jefferson, Cedar Rapids	1141
21	East, Sioux City	1093
22	West, Iowa City	1116
23	Senior, Dubuque	1058
24	Hempstead, Dubuque	1024
25	Bettendorf	991
26	Ames	1077
27	Dowling Catholic, West Des Moines	1099
28	Ottumwa	1027
29	Muscatine	966
30	North, Des Moines	957
31	Abraham Lincoln, Council Bluffs	939
32	Liberty, Iowa City	1023
33	Urbandale	924
34	Central, Davenport	961
35	West, Sioux City	892
36	Davenport West	875
37	Indianola	844
38	Washington, Cedar Rapids	819
39	Thomas Jefferson, Council Bluffs	839
40	North, Davenport	764
41	East, Waterloo	809
42	Dallas Center-Grimes	873
43	North Scott, Eldridge	843
44	Norwalk	809
45	Lewis Central, Council Bluffs	772
46	Fort Dodge	766
47	Clinton	772
48	Mason City	689
49	Burlington	723
50	Western Dubuque, Epworth	732
51	Hoover, Des Moines	617
52	Storm Lake	643
53	Newton	636
54	Bondurant-Farrar	636
55	Pella	579
56	Clear Creek Amana, Tiffin	626
57	Denison-Schleswig	568
58	Waverly-Shell Rock	547
59	Carlisle	546
60	Marion	531
61	Le Mars	478
62	Spencer	511
63	Boone	510
64	ADM, Adel	500
65	Oskaloosa	465
66	Xavier, Cedar Rapids	491
67	North Polk, Alleman	472
68	Glenwood	426
69	Ballard, Huxley	455
70	Mount Pleasant	388
71	Keokuk	390
72	Decorah	390
73	Grinnell	370
74	Sioux Center	395
75	Sergeant Bluff-Luton	401
76	Bishop Heelan Catholic, Sioux City	377
77	Perry	410
78	Winterset	369
79	Fort Madison	415
80	Gilbert	406
81	Central DeWitt	381
82	Webster City	386
83	Knoxville	347
84	Nevada	340
85	MOC-Floyd Valley, Orange City	340
86	Harlan	325
87	Solon	348
88	Independence	376
89	Maquoketa	323
90	Carroll	349
91	Creston	328
92	Benton Community, Van Horne	366
93	Saydel, Des Moines	305
94	Clear Lake	351
95	Atlantic	324
96	Assumption, Davenport	403
97	Wahlert Catholic, Dubuque	354
98	Humboldt	324
99	Des Moines Christian	358
100	Mount Vernon	333
101	Fairfield	320
102	Charles City	294
103	Algona	346
104	Washington	327
105	Center Point-Urbana	302
106	West Delaware, Manchester	318
107	South Tama County, Tama	322
108	Vinton-Shellsburg	310
109	Hampton-Dumont-CAL	297
110	Williamsburg	294
111	Clarke, Osceola	312
112	West Liberty	308
113	Iowa Falls-Alden	297
114	Waukon	278
115	Anamosa	278
116	Washington, Cherokee	274
117	Greene County, Jefferson	263
118	Spirit Lake	283
119	Centerville	260
120	Mid-Prairie, Wellman	266
121	Okoboji, Milford	250
122	Chariton	264
123	Sheldon	276
124	Central Lee, Donnellson	267
125	Unity Christian, Orange City	258
126	PCM, Monroe	250
127	Estherville Lincoln Central	233
128	Crestwood, Cresco	242
129	Davis County, Bloomfield	251
130	Clarinda	261
131	Albia	236
132	Oelwein	217
133	Southeast Valley, Gowrie	227
134	Eagle Grove	206
135	North Fayette Valley, West Union	227
136	OABCIG, Ida Grove	219
137	Roland-Story, Story City	249
138	Van Meter	244
139	Forest City	248
140	Monticello	230
141	Mediapolis	218
142	Shenandoah	214
143	New Hampton	225
144	Pella Christian	240
145	Tipton	214
146	Osage	209
148	Western Christian, Hull	233
147	Wilton	215
149	Alburnett	206
150	Kuemper Catholic, Carroll	229
151	Camanche	212
152	Red Oak	199
153	Dike-New Hartford	219
154	Garner-Hayfield-Ventura	190
155	Clarion-Goldfield-Dows	196
156	Woodward-Granger	204
157	West Marshall, State Center	201
158	Union, La Porte City	192
159	West Branch	212
160	Eddyville-Blakesburg-Fremont	231
161	Denver	207
162	Cardinal, Eldon	204
163	Interstate 35, Truro	195
164	West Lyon, Inwood	196
165	Pocahontas Area	181
166	MFL MarMac, Monona	190
167	West Central Valley, Stuart	193
168	Northeast, Goose Lake	204
169	Treynor	217
170	Jesup	178
171	MVAOCOU, Mapleton	162
172	Grand View Christian, Des Moines	224
173	West Burlington	196
174	Underwood	181
175	Regina, Iowa City	202
176	Columbus Catholic, Waterloo	224
177	Cascade (Western Dubuque)	180
179	South Hardin, Eldora	177
178	Ridge View, Holstein	163
180	Grundy Center	164
181	Central Springs, Manly	175
182	Central Lyon, Rock Rapids	181
183	South Central Calhoun, Lake City	197
184	Ogden	160
185	Louisa-Muscatine, Letts	175
186	Aplington-Parkersburg	186
187	Emmetsburg	184
188	West Sioux, Hawarden	176
189	Durant	154
190	Postville	157
191	East Sac County, Lake View	170
192	Pleasantville	174
193	Hinton	173
194	Sumner-Fredericksburg	155
195	Rock Valley	179
196	Panorama, Panora	159
197	Sioux Central, Sioux Rapids	165
198	Manson Northwest Webster	169
199	Alta-Aurelia	172
200	Hudson	170
201	Beckman Catholic, Dyersville	164
202	Tri-Center, Neola	152
203	Nodaway Valley, Greenfield	151
204	Columbus Community, Columbus Junction	154
205	South Hamilton, Jewell	146
206	Missouri Valley	153
207	Hartley-Melvin-Sanborn	158
208	Van Buren County, Keosauqua	175
209	Maquoketa Valley, Delhi	157
210	Lawton-Bronson	206
211	MMCRU, Marcus	139
212	Central Decatur, Leon	128
213	Riverside, Oakland	165
214	Lisbon	139
215	Belmond-Klemme	143
216	Logan-Magnolia	160
217	Colfax-Mingo	142
218	Bellevue	145
219	Sibley-Ocheyedan	136
220	East Marshall, LeGrand	140
221	Wapsie Valley, Fairbank	129
222	Nashua-Plainfield	142
223	South Winneshiek, Calmar	157
224	Sigourney	149
225	AHSTW, Avoca	154
226	Southwest Valley, Corning	148
227	Madrid	149
228	Danville	140
229	Earlham	123
230	ACGC, Guthrie Center	138
231	West Fork, Sheffield	149
232	Westwood, Sloan	133
233	Mount Ayr	115
234	B-G-M, Brooklyn	121
235	Wapello	121
236	AGWSR, Ackley	159
237	Woodbury Central, Moville	122
238	North Cedar, Stanwood	111
239	Lake Mills	134
240	IKM-Manning	143
241	East Buchanan, Winthrop	118
242	Woodbine	126
243	St. Albert, Council Bluffs	129
244	Pekin, Packwood	127
245	North Butler, Greene	117
246	Wayne, Corydon	123
247	Akron-Westfield	138
248	Lynnville-Sully	124
249	North Mahaska, New Sharon	125
250	Midland, Wyoming	118
251	WACO, Wayland	133
252	Saint Ansgar	129
253	Boyden-Hull	126
254	West Hancock, Britt	126
255	North Union, Armstrong	117
256	Clayton Ridge, Guttenberg	133
257	BCLUW, Conrad	118
258	Starmont, Arlington	130
259	West Monona, Onawa	105
260	South O'Brien, Paullina	119
261	Ankeny Christian	121
262	North Linn, Troy Mills	108
263	New London	125
264	Martensdale-St Marys	113
265	Lenox	91
266	Newman Catholic, Mason City	108
267	Audubon	113
268	St. Edmond, Fort Dodge	120
269	Kingsley-Pierson	97
270	Iowa Valley, Marengo	113
271	Gehlen Catholic, Le Mars	101
272	Baxter	101
273	Boyer Valley, Dunlap	97
274	Southeast Warren, Liberty Center	97
275	Fremont-Mills, Tabor	98
276	Calamus-Wheatland	90
277	Northwood-Kensett	97
278	Newell-Fonda	130
279	Highland, Riverside	101
280	Edgewood-Colesburg	95
281	Bishop Garrigan, Algona	98
282	Notre Dame, Burlington	101
283	East Mills, Malvern	89
284	East Union, Afton	102
285	Montezuma	104
286	Coon Rapids-Bayard	96
287	Gladbrook-Reinbeck	106
288	North Iowa, Buffalo Center	105
289	CAM, Anita	98
290	Turkey Valley, Jackson Junction	80
291	Sidney	101
292	North Tama, Traer	92
293	GMG, Garwin	96
294	Easton Valley, Preston	103
295	Central, Elkader	87
296	Belle Plaine	110
297	Woodward Academy	85
298	Springville	96
299	English Valleys, North English	93
300	Janesville	107
301	Moravia	88
302	Winfield-Mount Union	93
303	West Bend-Mallard	95
304	Bedford	89
305	Melcher-Dallas	67
306	Graettinger-Terril	68
307	Riceville	83
308	Dunkerton	76
309	Don Bosco, Gilbertville	97
310	Collins-Maxwell	78
311	Waterloo Christian (now known as Cedar Ridge Christian)	63
312	Lone Tree	69
313	Griswold	76
314	Exira-EHK, Elkhorn	67
315	West Central, Maynard	77
316	Rockford	63
317	George-Little Rock	82
318	Tripoli	65
319	Glidden-Ralston	69
320	Colo-NESCO	78
321	Harris-Lake Park	80
322	H-L-V, Victor	62
323	Siouxland Christian, Sioux City	87
324	Central City	69
325	Twin Cedars, Bussey	64
326	Hillcrest Academy, Kalona	76
327	Murray	77
328	Clarksville	63
329	Kee, Lansing	55
330	West Harrison, Mondamin	54
331	Lamoni	59
332	Keota	59
333	Stanton	50
334	Seymour	44
335	Meskwaki Settlement School, Tama	62
336	River Valley, Correctionville	56
337	Marquette Catholic, Bellevue	48
338	Holy Trinity Catholic, Fort Madison	64
339	Ar-We-Va, Westside	44
340	Hamburg Charter	45
341	Mormon Trail, Garden Grove	59
342	Paton-Churdan	48
343	Rivermont Collegiate, Bettendorf	40
344	Trinity Christian, Hull	50
345	Prince of Peace Catholic, Clinton	51
346	Isaac Newton Christian, Cedar Rapids	43
347	Tri-County, Thornburg	44
348	St. Mary Catholic, Storm Lake	35
349	Moulton-Udell	38
350	Heartland Christian, Council Bluffs	57
351	Cedar Valley Christian, Cedar Rapids	35
352	Valley Lutheran, Cedar Falls	29
353	Tri-State Christian, Dubuque	37
354	Morning Star Academy, Bettendorf	32
355	Essex	41
356	St. Mary's, Remsen	37
357	Maharishi, Fairfield	33
358	Ruthven-Ayrshire	28
359	Iowa School for the Deaf, Council Bluffs	21
360	Whiting	29
361	Scattergood Friends, West Branch	22
362	North Iowa Christian, Mason City	23
363	Diagonal	27
364	JW Reed Christian Academy, Des Moines	22
365	Joshua Christian Academy, Des Moines	28
366	Ottumwa Christian, Ottumwa	25
367	New City Classical Academy, Bettendorf	15
368	Coram Deo Academy, Davenport	28
369	Strong Roots Christian, Indianola	8
370	Empigo Academy, Des Moines	15
371	Clear Lake Classical, Clear Lake	23
372	Unity Ridge Lutheran School, Denison	9

== Baseball ==
The IHSAA, historically, has had 3 state baseball championships. Currently, there is only one: the Summer State Championship, whose winners are currently recognized as the State Champions. Historically, however, the winners of all 3 tournaments are given credit for State Championships. Iowa was the first State Association in the nation to hold a baseball championship meet in the summer.

=== Classification guidelines ===
- 4A- Largest 48 schools
- 3A- Next 64 largest schools
- 2A- Next 96 largest schools
- 1A- Remaining schools

=== State Champions ===
==== Summer Tournament ====
The summer tournament was first held in 1946, with one classification from 1946 to 1972. From 1973 to 1980, there were 2 classifications (1A and 2A), and since 1981 there have been 4 classifications (1A, 2A, 3A, and 4A).

Iowa Summer State Tournament Champions.
Year	1A	2A	3A	4A
1946	Burlington			
1947	Cedar Rapids, Wilson			
1948	Cedar Rapids, Wilson			
1949	Cedar Rapids, Franklin			
1950	Cedar Rapids, Wilson			
1951	Exira			
1952	Colesburg			
1953	Council Bluffs, Thomas Jefferson			
1954	Dubuque, Senior			
1955	Valley, West Des Moines			
1956	Muscatine			
1957	Muscatine			
1958	Muscatine			
1959	Council Bluffs, Thomas Jefferson			
1960	Council Bluffs, Thomas Jefferson			
1961	Ames			
1962	Council Bluffs, Thomas Jefferson			
1963	St. Mary Catholic, Clinton			
1964	Clinton			
1965	Boone			
1966	Cedar Rapids, Washington			
1967	Boone			
1968	Beckman Catholic, Dyersville			
1969	Fort Dodge			
1970	Decorah			
1971	Benton Community			
1972	Mason City			
1973	Kee	Council Bluffs, Thomas Jefferson		
1974	Spalding Catholic, Granville	Dubuque, Hempstead		
1975	Spalding Catholic, Granville	Burlington		
1976	Marshalltown	MFL		
1977	Johnston	Davenport, West		
1978	Don Bosco Catholic, Gilbertville	Dubuque, Hempstead		
1979	St. John Catholic, Independence	Davenport, Central		
1980	Kee	Des Moines, East		
1981	Norway	Kee	St. Albert Catholic, Council Bluffs	Marshalltown
1982	Norway	Notre Dame Catholic, Burlington	Norwalk	Assumption Catholic, Davenport
1983	Norway	St. Mary Catholic, Remsen	Maquoketa	Dubuque, Hempstead
1984	Norway	St. Mary Catholic, Remsen	Forest City	Dubuque, Hempstead
1985	St. John Catholic, Bancroft	St. Mary Catholic, Remsen	Turkey Valley	Marshalltown
1986	St. John Catholic, Bancroft	Kee	Beckman Catholic, Dyersville	Marshalltown
1987	Norway	Tri-Center	Camanche	Davenport, West
1988	Norway	Lynnville-Sully	Centerville	Dowling Catholic, West Des Moines
1989	Spalding Catholic, Granville	Kee	Central Lee	Dowling Catholic, West Des Moines
1990	Norway	Kee	Spencer	Decorah
1991	Norway	Kee	Decorah	Waterloo, West
1992	Kee	Postville	Assumption Catholic, Davenport	Ankeny
1993	St. Mary Catholic, Storm Lake	Wilton	Assumption Catholic, Davenport	Council Bluffs, Thomas Jefferson
1994	Lisbon	Pella Christian	Denison	Cedar Rapids, Washington
1995	Gehlen Catholic, Le Mars	Sumner	Assumption Catholic, Davenport	Valley, West Des Moines
1996	North Kossuth	St. Albert Catholic, Council Bluffs	Harlan	Ottumwa
1997	North Kossuth	Mount Vernon	Spencer	Ottumwa
1998	Newman Catholic, Mason City	Iowa Falls	Vinton	Des Moines, Lincoln
1999	Gehlen Catholic, Le Mars	St. Albert Catholic, Council Bluffs	Assumption Catholic, Davenport	Dowling Catholic, West Des Moines
2000	Spalding Catholic, Grenville	Beckman Catholic, Dyersville	Fort Madison	Urbandale
2001	Spalding Catholic, Granville	Emmetsburg	Bishop Heelan Catholic, Sioux City	Dowling Catholic, West Des Moines
2002	Newman Catholic, Mason City	Eagle Grove	Knoxville	Marshalltown
2003	Van Meter	Carlisle	Harlan	Valley, West Des Moines
2004	Martensdale-St Marys	Mid-Prairie	Assumption Catholic, Davenport	Valley, West Des Moines
2005	Kee	Wilton	Bishop Heelan Catholic, Sioux City	Valley, West Des Moines
2006	Lenox	Assumption Catholic, Davenport	Xavier Catholic, Cedar Rapids	Valley, West Des Moines
2007	Iowa Mennonite School, Kalona	Cherokee, Washington	West Delaware	Urbandale
2008	North Kossuth	Assumption Catholic, Davenport	Centerville	Johnston
2009	Newman Catholic, Mason City	St. Edmond Catholic, Fort Dodge	Norwalk	Sioux City North
2010	Martensdale-St Marys	Solon	Glenwood	Cedar Rapids, Kennedy
2011	Martensdale-St Marys	Davis County	Solon	Dowling Catholic, West Des Moines
2012	Martensdale-St Marys	Beckman Catholic, Dyersville	Dallas Center-Grimes	Ankeny
2013	Newman Catholic, Mason City	Beckman Catholic, Dyersville	Clear Lake	Johnston
2014	Twin Cedars	North Polk	Assumption Catholic, Davenport	Southeast Polk
2015	Newman Catholic, Mason City	Clear Lake	Waverly-Shell Rock	Southeast Polk
2016	St. Mary Catholic, Remsen	Clear Lake	Harlan	Prairie, Cedar Rapids
2017	Newman Catholic, Mason City	Beckman Catholic, Dyersville	Assumption Catholic, Davenport	Johnston
2018	Newman Catholic, Mason City	Centerville	Assumption Catholic, Davenport	Urbandale
2019	Newman Catholic, Mason City	Van Meter	Xavier Catholic, Cedar Rapids	Urbandale
2020	Don Bosco Catholic, Gilbertville	Van Meter	Norwalk	Johnston
2021	St. Albert Catholic, Council Bluffs	Van Meter	Marion	Pleasant Valley
2022	New London	Van Meter	Epworth, Western Dubuque	Johnston
2023	St. Mary Catholic, Remsen	Beckman Catholic, Dyersville	Epworth, Western Dubuque	Johnston
2024	Lynnville-Sully	Underwood	North Polk	Cedar Rapids, Kennedy
2025	Saint Ansgar	Pleasantville	Pella	Iowa City, City High
2026	Newman Catholic, Mason City	Pleasantville	Assumption Catholic, Davenport	Indianola

==== Spring Tournament ====
The Spring Tournament was held every summer from 1928 to 1972, and is the oldest of the 3 state tournaments. In the 4 years prior to 1928 (1924–1927), Iowa State College hosted an "invitational state tournament" in the spring that attracted nearly 40 schools, but was unofficial in nature. Unlike the Summer tournament, the Spring tournament never divided into separate classes.

Iowa Spring State Tournament Champions.
Year	Champion
1928	Dows
1929	Saint Ansgar
1930	Corning
1931	Des Moines, North
1932	Armstrong
1933	Manson
1934	Des Moines, North
1935	Mason City
1936	Des Moines, North
1937	Mason City
1938	Mason City
1939	Everly
1940	Davenport
1941	Davenport
1942	Rockwell City
1943	Corwith
1944	Davenport
1945	Cedar Rapids, Roosevelt
1946	Mason City
1947	Davenport
1948	Monona
1949	Davenport
1950	Davenport
1951	Loras Catholic, Dubuque
1952	Kanawha
1953	St. Ambrose Catholic, Davenport
1954	Waterloo, East
1955	Des Moines, Lincoln
1956	Mason City
1957	Council Bluffs, Thomas Jefferson
1958	St. John Catholic, Bancroft
1959	Corwith-Wesley
1960	Davenport
1961	Cedar Rapids, Jefferson
1962	Council Bluffs, Thomas Jefferson
1963	Davenport, West
1964	St. John Catholic, Bancroft
1965	Davenport, West
1966	Council Bluffs, Thomas Jefferson
1967	Norway
1968	Norway
1969	Davenport, Central
1970	Davenport, Central
1971	Davenport, Central
1972	Mason City

==== Fall Tournament ====
The Fall Tournament was held every summer from 1939 to 1985. Unlike the Summer tournament, the Fall tournament never divided into separate classes. .

Iowa Fall State Tournament Champions.
Year	Champion
1939	Grand Junction
1940	Bancroft
1941	Martensdale
1942	No Fall Tournament Held
1943	St. John Catholic, Bancroft
1944	Wiota
1945	Pomeroy
1946	Van Meter
1947	Monona
1948	Kanawha
1949	Anthon
1950	St. John Catholic, Bancroft
1951	Rock Valley
1952	Van Horne
1953	Auburn
1954	Corwith
1955	Tracy
1956	Central City
1957	St. John Catholic, Bancroft
1958	Corwith-Wesley
1959	St. John Catholic, Bancroft
1960	St. John Catholic, Bancroft
1961	Elwood
1962	South Hamilton
1963	Keystone
1964	Lawton
1965	Norway
1966	Norway
1967	Norway
1968	Norway
1969	OLGC Catholic, Fonda
1970	Norway
1971	Spalding Catholic, Granville
1972	Norway
1973	Burlington
1974	Norway
1975	St. Bernard Catholic, Breda
1976	Spalding Catholic, Granville
1977	Kee
1978	Kee
1979	Norway
1980	St. Mary Catholic, Remsen
1981	St. Mary Catholic, Remsen
1982	Norway
1983	Norway
1984	St. Mary Catholic, Remsen
1985	Holy Cross Catholic, Leo

== Basketball ==
=== Classification guidelines ===
- 4A- Largest 48 schools
- 3A- Next 64 largest schools
- 2A- Next 96 largest schools*
- 1A- Remaining schools

*IHSAA Board policy allows schools to participate in a higher classification than their enrollment places them in a sport with four classes. Schools requesting this placement will remain in higher class for two years. As a result, In the 2014-15 school year, there were 97 schools in 2A basketball, even though regulations call for 96

=== State Champions ===
==== Timeline ====
- 1912–1919 – unsupervised, non IHSAA sponsored state championship crowning one state champion.
- 1920–1922 – unsupervised, non IHSAA sponsored state championship crowning two state champions, one in Iowa City and one in Ames.
- 1923 – supervised, IHSAA sponsored state championship crowning one state champion; round robin format
- 1924 – no state champion listed according to IHSAA website
- 1925–1926 – supervised, IHSAA sponsored state championship crowning two state champions in "A" and "B" divisions; round robin format
- 1927–1955 – supervised, IHSAA sponsored state championship crowning one state champion
- 1956–1960 – supervised, IHSAA sponsored state championship crowning two state champions in "A" and "B" divisions
- 1961–1966 – supervised, IHSAA sponsored state championship crowning one state champion
- 1967–1974 – supervised, IHSAA sponsored state championship crowning two state champions in "1A" and "2A" classes
- 1975–1984 – supervised, IHSAA sponsored state championship crowning three state champions in "1A", "2A", and "3A" classes.
- 1985–1992 – supervised, IHSAA sponsored state championship crowning four state champions in "A", "1A", "2A", and "3A" classes.
- 1993–present – supervised, IHSAA sponsored state championship crowning four state champions in "1A", "2A", "3A" and "4A" classes.

Iowa State Basketball Tournament Champions (Pre-IHSAA).
Year	Division/Class	Champion
1912*		Ottumwa
1913*		Davenport
1914*		Cedar Rapids, Washington
1915*		Ottumwa
1916*		Cedar Rapids, Washington
1917*		Mount Pleasant
1918*		Mount Pleasant
1919*		Fort Dodge
1920*	Iowa City; Ames	Davenport; Boone
1921*	Iowa City; Ames	Davenport; Boone
1922*	Iowa City; Ames	Cedar Rapids, Washington; Grinnell

IHSAA-Sponsored State Champions (1923–66)
Year	A	B
1923	Osage	
1924	Sioux City, Central	
1925	Waterloo, West	Lawton
1926	Newton	Irwin
1927	Muscatine	
1928	Ottumwa	
1929	Davenport	
1930	Davenport	
1931	Boone	
1932	Des Moines, Roosevelt	
1933	Dunkerton	
1934	Sioux City, East	
1935	Mason City	
1936	Ames	
1937	Melrose	
1938	Diagonal	
1939	Creston	
1940	Mason City	
1941	Davenport	
1942	Ottumwa	
1943	Mason City	
1944	Waverly	
1945	Ames	
1946	Iowa City	
1947	Davenport	
1948	Manning	
1949	Ottumwa	
1950	Davenport	
1951	Davenport	
1952	Davenport	
1953	St. Mary Catholic, Clinton	
1954	Muscatine	
1955	Ames	
1956	Marshalltown	St. Mary Catholic, Iowa City
1957	Dowling Catholic, West Des Moines	St. Mary Catholic, Iowa City
1958	Davenport	Roland
1959	Sioux Center	Calumet
1960	Marshalltown	Wheatland
1961	Marshalltown	
1962	Regis Catholic, Cedar Rapids	
1963	Newton	
1964	Newton	
1965	Des Moines, Roosevelt	
1966	Marshalltown	

IHSAA-Sponsored State Champions (1967–present)
Year	1A	2A	3A	
1967	Sioux Center	Cedar Rapids, Jefferson		
1968	Paullina	Storm Lake		
1969	Paullina	Cedar Rapids, Washington		
1970	Wheatland	Davenport, Central		
1971	Montezuma	Davenport, West		
1972	Alta	Cedar Rapids, Kennedy		
1973	Mount Vernon	Ames		
1974	Unity Christian, Orange City	Waterloo, East		
1975	St. Mary Catholic, Clinton	St. Albert Catholic, Council Bluffs	Des Moines, Lincoln	
1976	Regina Catholic, Iowa City	Forest City	Ames	
1977	St. Mary Catholic, Clinton	Roland-Story	Iowa City, West	
1978	Regina Catholic, Iowa City	Denison	Des Moines, Roosevelt	
1979	Regina Catholic, Iowa City	Regis Catholic, Cedar Rapids	Dowling Catholic, West Des Moines	
1980	Dike	Storm Lake	Wahlert Catholic, Dubuque	
1981	Paullina	Central Clinton	Wahlert Catholic, Dubuque	
1982	Paullina	Regis Catholic, Cedar Rapids	Assumption Catholic, Davenport	
1983	Palmer	Regis Catholic, Cedar Rapids	Linn-Mar	
1984	Denver	Regis Catholic, Cedar Rapids	Cedar Rapids, Kennedy	
Year	A	1A	2A	3A
1985	Lone Tree	Nashua	Western Christian, Hull	Kuemper Catholic, Carroll
1986	Palmer	Unity Christian, Orange City	Washington	Bettendorf
1987	Palmer	Pocahontas	Estherville	Burlington
1988	Palmer	Maurice-Orange City	Perry	Fort Dodge
1989	Keota	Maurice-Orange City	St. Albert Catholic, Council Bluffs	Iowa City, City High
1990	Colo-NESCO	Montezuma	Pella Christian	Waterloo, East
1991	Aplington	Newell-Fonda	Western Christian, Hull	Ames
1992	Aplington	Iowa Mennonite School, Kalona	Pella Christian	Clinton
Year	1A	2A	3A	4A
1993	Hudson	Pella Christian	New Hampton	Valley, West Des Moines
1994	Pomeroy-Palmer	Unity Christian, Orange City	Johnston	Davenport, West
1995	Winfield-Mount Union	Osage	Johnston	Ankeny
1996	Rock Valley	North Polk	Western Christian, Hull	Mason City
1997	Newell-Fonda	Bondurant-Farrar	Creston	Mason City
1998	Rock Valley	Iowa Falls	Prairie, Cedar Rapids	Iowa City, West
1999	Newell-Fonda	Iowa Falls	Assumption Catholic, Davenport	Sioux City, West
2000	Newell-Fonda	St. Edmond Catholic, Fort Dodge	Assumption Catholic, Davenport	Iowa City, West
2001	Pomeroy-Palmer	Danville	Epworth, Western Dubuque	Indianola
2002	Pomeroy-Palmer	Danville	Pella	Sioux City, East
2003	Boyden-Hull	Sioux Center	Pella	Waterloo, East
2004	Dunkerton	PCM	Harlan	Linn-Mar
2005	North Mahaska	Unity Christian, Orange City	MOC-Floyd Valley	Bettendorf
2006	George-Little Rock	Nodaway Valley	Harlan	Des Moines, Hoover
2007	Northwood-Kensett	Western Christian, Hull	Waverly-Shell Rock	Linn-Mar
2008	Northern University, Cedar Falls	Western Christian, Hull	Wahlert Catholic, Dubuque	Iowa City, City High
2009	Rock Valley	Solon	Bishop Heelan Catholic, Sioux City	Ames
2010	Rock Valley	Western Christian, Hull	Bishop Heelan Catholic, Sioux City	Ames
2011	St. Mary Catholic, Storm Lake	West Fork	Bishop Heelan Catholic, Sioux City	Linn-Mar
2012	Boyden-Hull	Mount Vernon	Mount Pleasant	Iowa City, West
2013	Boyden-Hull	Sheldon	Waverly-Shell Rock	Iowa City, West
2014	West Lyon	Western Christian, Hull	Wahlert Catholic, Dubuque	Iowa City, West
2015	Gladbrook-Reinbeck	Treynor	Wahlert Catholic, Dubuque	North Scott
2016	South O'Brien	Western Christian, Hull	Xavier Catholic, Cedar Rapids	Valley, West Des Moines
2017	Grand View Christian, Des Moines	Western Christian, Hull	Xavier Catholic, Cedar Rapids	Iowa City, West
2018	Grand View Christian, Des Moines	Cascade, Western Dubuque	Glenwood	Cedar Falls
2019	Grand View Christian, Des Moines	North Linn	Oskaloosa	Cedar Falls
2020	Wapsie Valley	Boyden-Hull	Norwalk	Ankeny
2021	Montezuma	Western Christian, Hull	Pella	Waukee
2022	North Linn	Rock Valley	Dallas Center-Grimes	Ames
2023	Grand View Christian, Des Moines	Central Lyon	Bondurant-Farrar	Valley, West Des Moines
2024	North Linn	Western Christian, Hull	Assumption Catholic, Davenport	Valley, West Des Moines
2025	Madrid	Western Christian, Hull	MOC-Floyd Valley	Valley, West Des Moines
2026	St. Edmond	Unity Christian	Ballard	Cedar Falls

== Bowling ==
Bowling was first sanctioned by the IHSAA in 2009–2010.

=== State Champions ===
Iowa State Bowling Team Champions
Year	1A	2A	3A
2010	Wahlert Catholic, Dubuque	Clinton	
2011	Epworth, Western Dubuque	Davenport, North	
2012	Epworth, Western Dubuque	Dubuque, Hempstead	
2013	Wahlert Catholic, Dubuque	Davenport, North	
2014	Waverly-Shell Rock	Davenport, North	
2015	Camanche	Fort Dodge	Marshalltown
2016	Vinton-Shellsburg	Urbandale	Cedar Falls
2017	West Delaware	Urbandale	Dubuque, Hempstead
2018	West Delaware	Epworth, Western Dubuque	Southeast Polk
2019	Red Oak	Council Bluffs, Thomas Jefferson	Davenport, North
2020	Camanche	Fort Dodge	Waterloo, West
2021	Louisa-Muscatine	Clinton	Marshalltown
2022	Shenandoah	Denison-Schleswig	Waukee
2023	Maquoketa	Fort Dodge	Waterloo, West
2024	Maquoketa	Clinton	Waterloo, West
2025	Vinton-Shellsburg	Lewis Central	Muscatine
2026	West Delaware	Denison-Schleswig	Waukee

== Cross country ==
Cross Country was first contested in Iowa in 1922, and is considered a fall sport. It is also the only sport that is jointly sanctioned by the IHSAA and the IGHSAU. The current official distance for cross country meets is 5000m (approximately 3.1 miles). The standard format for team scoring, per NFHS guidelines, is to sum the places of the 5 highest placing runners among qualifying teams (teams must have at least 5 runners to qualify in the context of the team competition) to obtain the team's score. Teams are then ranked with the lowest score winning. Additionally, a team may have up to 7 runners count in placing for team scores, although only the first 5 scores, with the 6th and 7th runners serving to displace and lower the position of runners on other teams.

=== Classification guidelines ===
In classifying Cross Country programs, due to the collaboration of the IHSAA and IGHSAU, teams are included in the largest 48, next 64, etc., on the basis of having either a boys or a girls program, as not all schools have both. This is to avoid a situation where boys and girls from the same school do not compete in the same class.

- 4A- Largest 48 schools
- 3A- Next 64 largest schools
- 2A- Next 72 largest schools
- 1A- Remaining Schools

=== State Champions ===
==== Timeline ====
- 1922–1929 – unsanctioned, unsupervised State Championship crowning one individual and one team state champion. Race length-2 miles
- 1930–1934 – sanctioned, supervised State Championship crowning one individual and one team state champion. Race length-2 miles
- 1935 – sanctioned, supervised State Championship crowning one individual and one team state champion. Race length-1.9 miles
- 1936 sanctioned, supervised State Championship crowning one individual and two team state champions. Race length-1.9 miles
- 1937–1946 – sanctioned, supervised State Championship crowning three individual and three team state champions. Race length-1.9 miles
- 1947 – sanctioned, supervised State Championship crowning four individual and no team state champions. Race length-1.9 miles
- 1948–1950 – sanctioned, supervised State Championship crowning four individual and four team state champions. Race length-1.9 miles
- 1951–1956 – sanctioned, supervised State Championship crowning four individual and four team state champions. Race length-1.8 miles
- 1957–1963 – sanctioned, supervised State Championship crowning five individual and five team state champions. Race length-1.8 miles
- 1964–1966 – sanctioned, supervised State Championship crowning six individual and six team state champions. Race length-1.8 miles
- 1967–1968 – sanctioned, supervised State Championship crowning six individual and six team state champions. Race length-2.0 miles
- 1969–1975 – sanctioned, supervised State Championship crowning seven individual and seven team state champions. Race length-2.0 miles
- 1976–1980 – sanctioned, supervised State Championship crowning four individual and four team state champions. Race length-2.0 miles
- 1981–1986 – sanctioned, supervised State Championship crowning three individual and three team state champions. Race length-2.0 miles
- 1987–2002 – sanctioned, supervised State Championship crowning three individual and three team state champions. Race length-5000 meters
- 2003–present – sanctioned, supervised State Championship crowning four individual and four team state champions. Race length-5000 meters

Iowa State Cross Country Team Champions
Year	Division/Class	Champion
1922*		Cedar Rapids
1923*		Iowa City
1924*		Shellsburg
1925*		(tie)Dubuque (tie)Fort Madison
1926*		Fort Madison
1927*		Iowa City, University High
1928*		Keokuk
1929*		Muscatine
1930		Muscatine
1931		Ottumwa
1932		Ottumwa
1933		Ottumwa
1934		Muscatine
1935		Oskaloosa
1936	A B	Oskaloosa; Iowa City, University High
1937	A B C	Des Moines East; Iowa City, University High; Clarence
1938	A B C	Oskaloosa; Iowa City, University High; Thornburg
1939	A B C	Knoxville; Williamsburg; Martinsburg
1940	A B C	Ottumwa; Iowa City, University High; Leclaire
1941	A B C	Des Moines, East; Iowa City, University High; Minburn
1942	A B C	Des Moines, East; Iowa City, University High; No race contested
1943	A B C	Des Moines, East; Iowa City, University High; Clarence
1944	A B C	Des Moines, North; Iowa City, University High; Mechanicsville
1945	A B C	Des Moines, North; Marion; Mechanicsville
1946	A B C	Des Moines, North; Marion; Mechanicsville
1947	A B C	Individual race run but no team scores kept Not contested due to weather Not contested due to weather
1948	AA; A B C	Council Bluffs, Abraham Lincoln; Cedar Rapids, Roosevelt; Marion; Napier
1949	AA; A B C	Des Moines, East; Fairfield; Marion; Ollie
1950	AA; A B - C	Des Moines, North; Des Moines, Tech (tie)Monroe (tie)Marion; Fremont
1951	AA; A - B C	Davenport (tie)Cedar Rapids, Roosevelt (tie)Charles City; Marion; Stanley
1952	AA; A B C	Des Moines, North; Marion; Eldora; Underwood
1953	AA; A B C	Des Moines, North; Marion; Eldora; Underwood
1954	AA; A B C	Des Moines, Tech; Marion; Eldora; Underwood
1955	AA; A B C	Des Moines, North; Valley, West Des Moines; Le Claire; Elliot
1956	AA; A B C	Des Moines, North; Clarinda; Le Claire; Sheffield
1957	AAA; AA; A B C	Sioux City, Central; Oskaloosa; Decorah; Saydel; Menlo
1958	AAA; AA; A B C	Sioux City, Central; Decorah; Marion; Sheffield; Lu Verne
1959	AAA; AA; A B C	Des Moines, Tech; Decorah; South Page; Underwood; Lu Verne
1960	AAA; AA; A B C	Des Moines, Tech; Marshalltown; Winterset; South Page; Lu Verne
1961	AAA; AA; A B C	Sioux City, Central; Marshalltown; West Sioux; Obedolt-Arthur; Klemme
1962	AAA; AA; A B - C	Des Moines, Tech; Valley, West Des Moines; Clarinda (tie)Odebolt-Arthur (tie)Sheffield-Chapin; Lu Verne
1963	AAA; AA; A B C	Sioux City, Central; Grinnell-Newburg; Clarinda; Anita; Sheffield-Chapin
1964	AAAA; AAA; AA; A B C	Sioux City, Central; Marshalltown; Decorah; Obedolt-Arthur; Anita; Miles
1965	AAAA; AAA; AA; A B C	Sioux City, Central; Marshalltown; Red Oak; Aquin Catholic, Cascade; Madrid; Immaculate Conception Catholic, Charles City
1966	AAAA; AAA; AA - A B C	Sioux City, Central; Marshalltown (tie)Red Oak (tie)Decorah; Aquin Catholic, Cascade; Farragut; Gruver Lincoln Central
1967	AAAA; AAA; AA; A B C -	Sioux City, Central; Ames; Red Oak; Decorah; Pekin (tie)Decorah-North Winneshiek (tie)Cedar Valley
1968	AAAA; AAA; AA; A B C	Des Moines, Lincoln; Ames; Urbandale; Decorah; Pekin; Miles
1969	AAAA; AAA; AA; A B C D	Cedar Falls; Columbus Catholic, Waterloo; Ankeny; Chariton; Central Lyon; BCL; Miles
1970	AAAA; AAA; AA; A B C D	Waterloo, West; Des Moines, Hoover; Urbandale; Osage; Aquinas Catholic, Fort Madison; BGM; Garnavillo
1971	AAAA; AAA; AA; A B C D	Davenport, Central; Columbus Catholic, Waterloo; Indianola; Sheldon; Aquinas Catholic, Fort Madison; Johnston; Notre Dame Catholic, Cresco
1972	AAAA; AAA; AA; A B C D	Mason City; Columbus Catholic, Waterloo; Indianola; Decorah; Johnston; Tri-County; Garnavillo
1973	AAAA; AAA; AA; A B C D -	Mason City; Ames; Lewis Central; Western Christian, Hull; Johnston; Milford (tie)Garnavillo (tie)Dike
1974	AAAA; AAA; AA; A B C D	Marshalltown; Dowling Catholic, West Des Moines; Assumption Catholic, Davenport; Decorah; Shenandoah; Dike; Sanborn
1975	AAAA; AAA; AA; A B C D	Marshalltown; Ames; Waverly-Shell Rock; Shenandoah; Tipton; Aquin Catholic, Cascade; Odebolt-Arthur
1976	AA; A B C	Clinton; Decorah; Unity Christian, Orange City; St. John Catholic, Bancroft
1977	AA; A B C	Des Moines, Hoover; Decorah; Unity Christian, Orange City; St. John Catholic, Bancroft
1978	AA; A B C	Muscatine; Decorah; Aquinas Catholic, Fort Madison; Garnavillo
1979	AA; A B C	Clinton; Centerville; Newman Catholic, Mason City; Aquinas Catholic, Fort Madison
1980	AA; A B C	Waverly-Shell Rock; Knoxville; Kee; Cardinal Stritch Catholic, Keokuk
1981	3A; 2A; 1A	Clinton; Sheldon; Kee
1982	3A; 2A; 1A	Clinton; Western Christian, Hull; Kee
1983	3A; 2A; 1A	Ames; Cascade, Western Dubuque; Unity Christian, Orange City
1984	3A; 2A; 1A	Clinton; Eagle Grove; Northern University, Cedar Falls
1985	3A; 2A; 1A	Dowling Catholic, West Des Moines; Cascade, Western Dubuque; Northern University, Cedar Falls
1986	3A; 2A; 1A	Clinton; Cascade, Western Dubuque; Woodbine
1987	3A; 2A; 1A	Dubuque, Senior; Eagle Grove; Woodbine
1988	3A; 2A; 1A	Iowa City, West; Shenandoah; Kee
1989	3A; 2A; 1A	Ames; Shenandoah; Kee
1990	3A; 2A; 1A	Muscatine; Decorah; Jesup
1991	3A; 2A; 1A	Iowa City, City High; Shenandoah; Williamsburg
1992	3A; 2A; 1A	Iowa City, City High; Decorah; St. Albert Catholic, Council Bluffs
1993	3A; 2A; 1A	Iowa City, City High; Waukon; Regina Catholic, Iowa City
1994	3A; 2A; 1A	Iowa City, City High; Humboldt; Denver
1995	3A; 2A; 1A	Dubuque, Senior; Waukon; Iowa Mennonite School, Kalona
1996	3A; 2A; 1A	Iowa City, City High; Waukon; Calamus-Wheatland
1997	3A; 2A; 1A	Iowa City, City High; Waukon; Regina Catholic, Iowa City
1998	3A; 2A; 1A	Dubuque, Senior; Waukon; Regina Catholic, Iowa City
1999	3A; 2A; 1A	Iowa City, City High; Waukon; West Sioux
2000	3A; 2A; 1A	Iowa City, City High; Central Clinton; Wapsie Valley
2001	3A; 2A; 1A	Des Moines, Roosevelt; Central Clinton; Bennett-Durant
2002	3A; 2A; 1A	Des Moines, Roosevelt; Waukon; Nodaway Valley
2003	4A; 3A; 2A; 1A	Des Moines, Roosevelt; Wahlert Catholic, Dubuque; Western Christian, Hull; Regina Catholic, Iowa City
2004	4A; 3A; 2A; 1A	Cedar Falls; Wahlert Catholic, Dubuque; Regina Catholic, Iowa City; Wapsie Valley
2005	4A; 3A; 2A; 1A	Cedar Falls; Lisbon-Mount Vernon; Western Christian, Hull; Wapsie Valley
2006	4A; 3A; 2A; 1A	Pleasant Valley; Xavier Catholic, Cedar Rapids; South Winneshiek; Regina Catholic, Iowa City
2007	4A; 3A; 2A; 1A	Pleasant Valley; Xavier Catholic, Cedar Rapids; Monticello; Regina Catholic, Iowa City
2008	4A; 3A; 2A; 1A	Pleasant Valley; Algona; Spirit Lake; South Winneshiek
2009	4A; 3A; 2A; 1A	Burlington; Pella; Spirit Lake; Iowa Mennonite School, Kalona
2010	4A; 3A; 2A; 1A	Prairie, Cedar Rapids; Wahlert Catholic, Dubuque; Regina Catholic, Iowa City; Northern University, Cedar Falls
2011	4A; 3A; 2A; 1A	Dowling Catholic, West Des Moines; Pella; Monticello; St. Albert Catholic, Council Bluffs
2012	4A; 3A; 2A; 1A	Dowling Catholic, West Des Moines; Decorah; Monticello; St. Albert Catholic, Council Bluffs
2013	4A; 3A; 2A; 1A	Prairie, Cedar Rapids; Boone; Monticello; Denver
2014	4A; 3A; 2A; 1A	Linn-Mar; Gilbert; East Marshall; Bellevue
2015	4A; 3A; 2A; 1A	Dowling Catholic, West Des Moines; Mount Vernon-Lisbon; Garner-Hayfield-Ventura; Nodaway Valley
2016	4A; 3A; 2A; 1A	Dowling Catholic, West Des Moines; Mount Vernon-Lisbon; Mid-Prairie; Nodaway Valley
2017	4A; 3A; 2A; 1A	Pleasant Valley; Gilbert; Central Lyon/George-Little Rock; Nodaway Valley
2018	4A; 3A; 2A; 1A	Dowling Catholic, West Des Moines; Gilbert; Tipton; Madrid
2019	4A; 3A; 2A; 1A	Dowling Catholic, West Des Moines; Dallas Center-Grimes; Tipton; Madrid
2020	4A; 3A; 2A; 1A	Sioux City, North; Dallas Center-Grimes; Danville/New London; Madrid
2021	4A; 3A; 2A; 1A	Dowling Catholic, West Des Moines; Dallas Center-Grimes; Tipton; ACGC
2022	4A; 3A; 2A; 1A	Dowling Catholic, West Des Moines; Pella; Des Moines Christian; Regina Catholic, Iowa City
2023	4A; 3A; 2A; 1A	Dowling Catholic, West Des Moines; Gilbert; Des Moines Christian; Lake Mills
2024	4A; 3A; 2A; 1A	Cedar Falls; Gilbert; Oelwein; Lake Mills
2025	4A; 3A; 2A; 1A	Indianola; Gilbert; Chariton; Riverside Oakland
2026	4A; 3A; 2A; 1A	Dowling Catholic, West Des Moines; Gilbert; Pella Christian; Riverside Oakland

== Football ==
=== Classification guidelines ===
Football classifications remain the same for 2 years, following remain the same for the 2021 and 2022 football seasons.

- 5A- Largest 36 schools by enrollment
- 4A- Next Largest 36
- 3A- Next Largest 36
- 2A- Next Largest 48
- 1A- Next Largest 48
- A- Remaining 11 player schools
- 8-player- Option for schools with an enrollment of 120 or less

=== State Champions ===
Although different sources claim that certain schools to have been state champions in years prior to 1972, these championships are not apparently recognized by the IHSAA and are not listed on its website, and it is not clear how these championships were determined. 8-Player started having postseason in 2000, the previous two years were regular season due to low number of teams.

Iowa State Football Championship Game winners
Year	8-player	A	1A	2A	3A	4A	5A
1972			Radcliffe	Sioux Center	Harlan	Cedar Rapids, Jefferson	
1973			Dexfield	Britt	Le Mars	Davenport, Central	
1974			AvoHa	Mount Vernon	Decorah	Davenport, West	
1975			Glidden-Ralston	Hudson	Urbandale	Bishop Heelan Catholic, Sioux City	
1976			BCL	Central Lyon	Columbus Catholic, Waterloo	Davenport, Central	
1977			Manilla	Central Lyon	Emmetsburg	Davenport, West	
1978			Eastwood	Sibley	Regis Catholic, Cedar Rapids	Mason City	
1979			Treynor	Sigourney	Emmetsburg	Dubuque, Hempstead	
1980			Woodbury Central	Roland-Story	Marion	Newton	
1981		Paullina	Dike	Roland-Story	Prairie, Cedar Rapids	Bettendorf	
1982		Lone Tree	Pekin	LaSalle Catholic, Cedar Rapids	Harlan	Bishop Heelan Catholic, Sioux City	
1983		Sutherland	Pekin	LaSalle Catholic, Cedar Rapids	Harlan	Davenport, Central	
1984		Schleswig	Pocahontas	Grundy Center	Harlan	Sioux City, East	
1985		Paton-Churdan	Center Point	Bishop Garrigan Catholic, Algona	Pleasant Valley	Linn-Mar	
1986		Paton-Churdan	Lynnville-Sully	Wapsie Valley	Columbus Catholic, Waterloo	Cedar Falls	
1987		GMG	Grundy Center	Wapsie Valley	Decorah	Bettendorf	
1988		Schleswig	Grundy Center	Solon	Decorah	Bettendorf	
1989		Laurens-Marathon	West Branch	Emmetsburg	Decorah	Linn-Mar	
1990		Logan-Magnolia	Southern Cal	Emmetsburg	Waverly-Shell Rock	Linn-Mar	
1991		Madrid	West Branch	Garner-Hayfield	West Delaware	Bettendorf	
1992		Bedford	West Branch	North Fayette	Waverly-Shell Rock	Bettendorf	
1993		Riceville	Aplington-Parkersburg	Mount Vernon	Harlan	Iowa City, City High	
1994		West Bend-Mallard	Hudson	Mount Vernon	Spencer	Iowa City, City High	
1995		Gehlen Catholic, Le Mars	Denver	Sigourney/Keota	Harlan	Iowa City, West	
1996		Guthrie Center	West Hancock	Iowa Falls	Oskaloosa	Iowa City, City High	
1997		West Central	Wapsie Valley	Emmetsburg	Harlan	Ankeny	
1998	Elk Horn-Kimballton (Regular season)	West Bend-Mallard	Pekin	West Lyon	Harlan	Iowa City, West	
1999	Elk Horn-Kimballton (Regular season)	West Bend-Mallard	West Marshall	West Lyon	New Hampton	Iowa City, West	
2000	Adair-Casey	Hubbard-Radcliffe	Southern Cal	Emmetsburg	Clear Lake	Dowling Catholic, West Des Moines	
2001	Adair-Casey	Fredericksburg	Aplington-Parkersburg	Sigourney/Keota	Epworth, Western Dubuque	Dowling Catholic, West Des Moines	
2002	Sentral	Manning	Akron-Westfield	Emmetsburg	Atlantic	Valley, West Des Moines	
2003	Sentral	Treynor	Eldora-New Providence	Emmetsburg	Harlan	Valley, West Des Moines	
2004	St. Mary Catholic, Remsen	West Bend-Mallard	St. Albert Catholic, Council Bluffs	Columbus Catholic, Waterloo	Harlan	Bettendorf	
2005	Glidden-Ralston	North Mahaska	Regina Catholic, Iowa City	Sigourney/Keota	Harlan	Valley, West Des Moines	
2006	Northeast Hamilton	IKM	St. Albert Catholic, Council Bluffs	Central Lyon/George-Little Rock	Humboldt	Xavier Catholic, Cedar Rapids	
2007	Stanton	Wapsie Valley	St. Albert Catholic, Council Bluffs	Solon	Keokuk	Bettendorf	
2008	Lenox	Southern Cal	Emmetsburg	Solon	Bishop Heelan Catholic, Sioux City	Valley, West Des Moines	
2009	Armstrong-Ringsted	Southern Cal	St. Albert Catholic, Council Bluffs	Solon	Harlan	Iowa City, City High	
2010	Lenox	North Tama	West Lyon	Regina Catholic, Iowa City	Solon	Dowling Catholic, West Des Moines	
2011	Fremont-Mills	Lisbon	Saint Ansgar	Regina Catholic, Iowa City	Union	Valley, West Des Moines	
2012	Marcus-Meriden-Cleghorn	Wapsie Valley	Regina Catholic, Iowa City	Spirit Lake	Decorah	Ankeny	
2013	Don Bosco Catholic, Gibertville	West Lyon	Regina Catholic, Iowa City	Kuemper Catholic, Carroll	Bishop Heelan Catholic, Sioux City	Dowling Catholic, West Des Moines	
2014	Newell-Fonda	Logan-Magnolia	Regina Catholic, Iowa City	North Fayette Valley	Pella	Dowling Catholic, West Des Moines	
2015	Marcus-Meriden-Cleghorn	Gladbrook-Reinbeck	Regina Catholic, Iowa City	Spirit Lake	Pella	Dowling Catholic, West Des Moines	
2016	Don Bosco Catholic, Gilbertsville	Gladbrook-Reinbeck	Western Christian, Hull	Boyden-Hull/Rock Valley	Pella	Dowling Catholic, West Des Moines	
2017	Don Bosco Catholic, Gilbertsville	West Sioux	Van Meter	Waukon	Xavier Catholic, Cedar Rapids	Dowling Catholic, West Des Moines	
2018	New London	Hudson	West Sioux	PCM	Xavier Catholic, Cedar Rapids	Dowling Catholic, West Des Moines	
2019	Don Bosco Catholic, Gilbertville	West Hancock	West Lyon	OABCIG	Epworth, Western Dubuque	Dowling Catholic, West Des Moines	
2020	St. Mary Catholic, Remsen	Regina Catholic, Iowa City	OABCIG	Waukon	North Scott	Ankeny	
2021	CAM	West Hancock	Van Meter	Southeast Valley	Harlan	Lewis Central	Southeast Polk
2022	St. Mary Catholic, Remsen	Grundy Center	Van Meter	Central Lyon/George-Little Rock	Harlan	Xavier Catholic, Cedar Rapids	Southeast Polk
2023	Bishop Garrigan Catholic, Algona	West Hancock	Grundy Center	Van Meter	Williamsburg	Lewis Central	Southeast Polk
2024	St. Mary Catholic, Remsen	Tri-Center	Grundy Center	West Lyon	Wahlert Catholic, Dubuque	North Polk	Southeast Polk
2025	Bishop Garrigan Catholic, Algona	MMCRU, Marcus	West Lyon	Kuemper Catholic, Carroll	Nevada	Xavier Catholic, Cedar Rapids	Dowling Catholic, West Des Moines

== Golf ==
The standard team scoring format for golf tournaments, per NFHS guidelines, is to add up the scores of 6 players with each player playing 2 rounds of 18 holes. Teams are then ranked according to lowest score.

=== Classification guidelines ===
- 4A (fall golf) – Largest 48 schools*
- 3A (spring golf) – Next 64
- 2A (spring golf) – Next 96
- 1A (spring golf) – Remaining schools

*Plus golf schools that play in 4A conferences that wish to play in the fall. In 2006–2007 there were 52 schools in class 4A

=== State Champions ===
Iowa State Championship Golf Tournament winners
Year	Class	Champion
1928		Des Moines, East
1929		Des Moines, Roosevelt
1930		Des Moines, Roosevelt
1931		Des Moines, Roosevelt
1932		Team Scores and placings not reported
1933		Des Moines, Roosevelt
1934		Des Moines, Roosevelt
1935		Tournament Rained Out
1936		Des Moines, Roosevelt
1937		Des Moines, Lincoln
1938		Des Moines, Roosevelt
1939		(tie)Des Moines, Roosevelt (tie)Des Moines, Lincoln
1940		Des Moines, Roosevelt
1941		Des Moines, Roosevelt
1942		Cedar Rapids, Franklin
1943		Ottumwa
1944		Ottumwa
1945		Ames
1946		(tie)Des Moines, Roosevelt (tie)Boone
1947		(tie)Des Moines, Roosevelt (tie) Cedar Rapids, Franklin
1948		Cedar Rapids, Franklin
1949		Ames
1950		Waterloo, West
1951		Waterloo, West
1952		Ottumwa
1953		Ottumwa
1954		St. Ambrose Catholic, Davenport
1955		Waterloo, West
1956		Waterloo, West
1957		Waterloo, West
1958		Clinton
1959	A B	Clinton; St. Mary Catholic, Marshalltown
1960	A B	Clinton; Sheldon
1961	A B	Muscatine; Storm Lake
1962	A B	Dubuque; Oelwein
1963	A B	Atlantic; Iowa Falls
1964	AA; A	Muscatine; Independence
1965	AA; A	Cedar Rapids, Jefferson; Xavier Catholic, Dyersville
1966	AA; A	Keokuk; Cherokee, Washington
1967	AA; A	Des Moines, Roosevelt; Audubon
1968	AA; A	Ames; Decorah
1969	AA; A	Columbus Catholic, Waterloo; Pella
1970	AA; A	Boone; Audubon
1971	AA; A	Waterloo, West; Vinton
1972	AA; A	Waterloo, West; Vinton
1973	AA; A	Waterloo, West; Pella
1974	AA; A	Estherville; West Branch
1975	AA; A	Oskaloosa; Bishop Garrigan Catholic, Algona
1976	AA; A	Valley, West Des Moines; Bishop Garrigan Catholic, Algona
1977	AAA; AA; A	Waterloo, West; Bishop Garrigan Catholic, Algona; Sibley
1978	AAA; AA; A	Bettendorf; Bishop Garrigan Catholic, Algona; Sibley
1979	AAA; AA; A	Clinton; Bishop Garrigan Catholic, Algona; Rock Valley
1980	AAA; AA; A	Clinton; Regis Catholic, Cedar Rapids; Gowrie-Prairie Valley
1981	AAA; AA; A	Cedar Rapids, Washington; Estherville; Britt
1982	4A; 3A; 2A; 1A	Ames; Bishop Garrigan Catholic, Algona; Denver; Calamus
1983	4A; 3A; 2A; 1A	Des Moines, Lincoln; Perry; Notre Dame Catholic, Burlington; Calamus
1984	4A; 3A; 2A; 1A	Dowling Catholic, West Des Moines; Bishop Garrigan Catholic, Algona; Adel-DeSoto; AvoHa
1985	4A; 3A; 2A; 1A	Oskaloosa; Atlantic; Durant; Rockwell-Swaledale
1986	4A; 3A; 2A; 1A	Ames; Vinton; Tripoli; Hartley-Melvin
1987	4A; 3A; 2A; 1A	Ottumwa; Algona; Woodward-Granger; Kingsley-Pierson
1988	4A; 3A; 2A; 1A	Ottumwa; Grinnell; Clarion; Rock Valley
1989	4A; 3A; 2A; 1A	Ottumwa; Oelwein; West Branch; Woodward-Granger
1990	4A; 3A; 2A; 1A	Newton; Alta-Aurelia; West Branch; Woodward-Granger
1991	4A; 3A; 2A; 1A	Ottumwa; Marion; West Branch; Newell-Fonda
1992	4A; 3A; 2A; 1A	Ottumwa; Regis Catholic, Cedar Rapids; West Branch; Rock Valley
1993	4A; 3A; 2A; 1A	Oskaloosa; Clear Lake; Wapello; Rock Valley
1994	4A; 3A; 2A; 1A	Newton; Oskaloosa; Aplington-Parkersburg; Newman Catholic, Mason City
1995	4A; 3A; 2A; 1A	Dowling Catholic, West Des Moines; Kuemper Catholic, Carroll; Hudson; Newman Catholic, Mason City
1996	4A; 3A; 2A; 1A	Dowling Catholic, West Des Moines; Keokuk; Hudson; Maharishi, Fairfield
1997	4A; 3A; 2A; 1A	Ottumwa; Ballard; Colfax-Mingo; Hubbard-Radcliffe
1998	4A; 3A; 2A; 1A	Waterloo, West; Clear Lake; Center Point-Urbana; Gehlen Catholic, Le Mars
1999	4A; 3A; 2A; 1A	Marshalltown; Columbus Catholic, Waterloo; Anamosa; Gladbrook-Reinbeck
2000	4A; 3A; 2A; 1A	Burlington; Columbus Catholic, Waterloo; Wapello; Rockford
2001	4A; 3A; 2A; 1A	Marshalltown; Pella; Ballard; Sumner
2002	4A; 3A; 2A; 1A	Muscatine; Columbus Catholic, Waterloo; Belle Plaine; Sumner
2003	4A; 3A; 2A; 1A	Marshalltown; Pella; Grundy Center; Sumner
2004	4A; 3A; 2A; 1A	Bettendorf; Clear Lake; Columbus Catholic, Waterloo; Newman Catholic, Mason City
2005	4A; 3A; 2A; 1A	Bettendorf; Clear Lake; Grundy Center; West Monona
2006	4A; 3A; 2A; 1A	Bettendorf; Clear Lake; Emmetsburg; Hinton
2007	4A; 3A; 2A; 1A	Bettendorf; Ballard; Hampton-Dumont; Newman Catholic, Mason City
2008	4A; 3A; 2A; 1A	Valley, West Des Moines; Ballard; PCM; NU, Cedar Falls
2009	4A; 3A; 2A; 1A	Ottumwa; Ballard; Kuemper Catholic, Carroll; Newman Catholic, Mason City
2010	4A; 3A; 2A; 1A	Dowling Catholic, West Des Moines; Ballard; Kuemper Catholic, Carroll; Bishop Garrigan Catholic, Algona
2011	4A; 3A; 2A; 1A	Waukee; Clear Lake; Kuemper Catholic, Carroll; Newman Catholic, Mason City
2012	4A; 3A; 2A; 1A	Valley, West Des Moines; Decorah; Columbus Catholic, Waterloo; Bishop Garrigan Catholic, Algona
2013	4A; 3A; 2A; 1A	Waukee; Creston/Orient-Macksburg; Columbus Catholic, Waterloo; Sibley-Ocheyedan
2014	4A; 3A; 2A; 1A	Ankeny, Centennial; West Delaware; South Hamilton; Bishop Garrigan Catholic, Algona
2015	4A; 3A; 2A; 1A	Waukee; Webster City; Panorama; Bishop Garrigan Catholic, Algona
2016	4A; 3A; 2A; 1A	Waukee; Webster City; Panorama; East Buchanan
2017	4A; 3A; 2A; 1A	Valley, West Des Moines; Central DeWitt; Clear Lake; East Buchanan
2018	4A; 3A; 2A; 1A	Marshalltown; Central DeWitt; Kuemper Catholic, Carroll; Grundy Center
2019	4A; 3A; 2A; 1A	Waukee; Nevada; Des Moines Christian; Harris-Lake Park
2020	4A; 3A, 2A, 1A	Waukee; Spring season cancelled due to COVID-19
2021	4A; 3A; 2A; 1A	Waukee; Gilbert; West Branch; AGWSR
2022	4A; 3A; 2A; 1A	Cedar Falls; Gilbert; Hudson; Lake Mills
2023	4A; 3A; 2A; 1A	Johnston; MOC-Floyd Valley; Grundy Center; Hillcrest Academy, Kalona
2024	4A; 3A; 2A; 1A	Valley, West Des Moines; ADM; Beckman Catholic, Dyersville; Boyden-Hull
2025	4A; 3A; 2A; 1A	Johnston; Waverly-Shell Rock, MOC-Floyd Valley; Columbus Catholic; Boyden-Hull
2026	4A; 3A; 2A; 1A	Dowling Catholic; Ballard; Columbus Catholic; Boyden-Hull

=== Fall Tournament ===
In 1940, 1941, and 1986–1993, teams could also participate in a separate Fall Championship. Listed below are the champions of those tournaments. Beginning in 1994, the Fall tournament became simply the 4A championship. Those results are included above.

Iowa State Championship Fall Golf Tournament winners
Year	Champion
1940	Des Moines, Roosevelt
1941	Des Moines, Roosevelt
1986	Columbus Catholic, Waterloo
1987	Dowling Catholic, West Des Moines
1988	Valley, West Des Moines
1989	Dowling Catholic, West Des Moines
1990	Cedar Rapids, Kennedy
1991	Dowling Catholic, West Des Moines
1992	Dowling Catholic, West Des Moines
1993	Newton

== Soccer ==
=== Classification guidelines ===
- 3A- Largest 36 schools (initiated in 2011)
- 2A- Next Largest 48 schools
- 1A- Remaining schools

=== State Champions ===
The current State Champion is the winner of the spring tournament that has been held since 1995 and was divided into 2 classes in 1998 and 3 classes starting in 2011. From 1994 to 2000, there was also a fall State Championship tournament that crowned a single champion. Winners of both tournaments are considered State Champions.

Iowa State Soccer Fall Tournament winners (BOYS)
Year	Champion
1994	West Point Catholic, Marquette
1995	Pella Christian
1996	Western Christian, Hull
1997	Iowa Mennonite School, Kalona
1998	Unity Christian, Orange City
1999	Unity Christian, Orange City
2000	Unity Christian, Orange City

Iowa State Soccer Spring Tournament winners (BOYS)
Year	1A champion	2A champion	3A champion	4A champion
1995	Bettendorf			
1996	Valley, West Des Moines			
1997	Valley, West Des Moines			
1998	St. Albert Catholic, Council Bluffs	Urbandale		
1999	Waukee	Bettendorf		
2000	Nevada	Iowa City West		
2001	Waukee	Valley, West Des Moines		
2002	Assumption Catholic, Davenport	Urbandale		
2003	Assumption Catholic, Davenport	Iowa City West		
2004	Xavier Catholic, Cedar Rapids	Bettendorf		
2005	Xavier Catholic, Cedar Rapids	Iowa City West		
2006	Xavier Catholic, Cedar Rapids	Valley, West Des Moines		
2007	Norwalk	Ankeny		
2008	Wahlert Catholic, Dubuque	Dowling Catholic, West Des Moines		
2009	Regina Catholic, Iowa City	Spencer	Iowa City West	
2010	Regina Catholic, Iowa City	Xavier Catholic, Cedar Rapids	Iowa City West	
2011	Regina Catholic, Iowa City	Xavier Catholic, Cedar Rapids	Dowling Catholic, West Des Moines	
2012	Columbus Catholic, Waterloo	Wahlert Catholic, Dubuque	Iowa City West	
2013	Regina Catholic, Iowa City	Xavier Catholic, Cedar Rapids	Iowa City West	
2014	Regina Catholic, Iowa City	Norwalk	Iowa City West	
2015	Beckman Catholic, Dyersville	Xavier Catholic, Cedar Rapids	Linn-Mar	
2016	Beckman Catholic, Dyersville	Norwalk	Valley, West Des Moines	
2017	Regina Catholic, Iowa City	Norwalk	Iowa City West	
2018	Regina Catholic, Iowa City	Pella	Waukee	
2019	Regina Catholic, Iowa City	Lewis Central	Waukee	
2020	Season Cancelled Due to COVID-19			
2021	Notre Dame Catholic/West Burlington	Xavier Catholic, Cedar Rapids	Pleasant Valley	
2022	Assumption Catholic, Davenport	Lewis Central	Pleasant Valley	
2023	Western Christian, Hull	Gilbert	Iowa City Liberty	Johnston
2024	North Fayette Valley	Bishop Heelan Catholic, Sioux City	Dallas Center-Grimes	Johnston
2025	West Sioux	Gilbert	Urbandale	Valley
2026	Regina Catholic, Iowa City	Gilbert	Hoover, Des Moines	Waukee Northwest

== Swimming & diving ==
=== Classification guidelines ===
Source:

=== State Champions ===
Iowa Swimming Team State Champions
Year	Champion	Runner-up	Site
1938	Des Moines North	Clinton	Des Moines
1939	Des Moines Roosevelt	Des Moines North	Ames
1940	Des Moines Roosevelt	Clinton	Ames
1941	Clinton	Des Moines North	Boone
1942	Des Moines North	Clinton	Ames
1943	Des Moines Roosevelt	Clinton	Ames
1944	Des Moines Roosevelt	Des Moines North	Ames
1945	Des Moines Roosevelt	Clinton	Des Moines
1946	Clinton	Des Moines Roosevelt	Iowa City
1947	Clinton	Des Moines Roosevelt	Iowa City
1948	Des Moines Roosevelt	Clinton	Ames
1949	Clinton	Des Moines North	Iowa City
1950	Des Moines Roosevelt	Clinton	Des Moines
1951	(tie)Des Moines Roosevelt (tie)Clinton	N/A	Iowa City
1952	Des Moines Roosevelt	Clinton	Ames
1953	Des Moines Roosevelt	Clinton	Ames
1954	Clinton	Des Moines Roosevelt	Iowa City
1955	Clinton	Des Moines Roosevelt	Iowa City
1956	Clinton	Des Moines Roosevelt	Des Moines
1957	Clinton	Des Moines Roosevelt	Des Moines
1958	Clinton	Des Moines Roosevelt	Des Moines
1959	Des Moines Roosevelt	Sioux City Central	Cedar Rapids
1960	Muscatine	Sioux City Central	Des Moines
1961	Cedar Rapids Washington	Clinton	Cedar Rapids
1962	Clinton	Des Moines Roosevelt	Des Moines
1963	Des Moines Roosevelt	(tie) Clinton & Cedar Rapids Washington	Iowa City
1964	Cedar Rapids Washington	Clinton	Iowa City
1965	Cedar Rapids Washington	Clinton	Iowa City
1966	Cedar Rapids Washington	Des Moines Roosevelt	Ames
1967	Cedar Rapids Washington	Clinton	Ames
1968	Cedar Rapids Washington	Clinton	Ames
1969	Cedar Rapids Washington	Davenport West	Ames
1970	Cedar Rapids Washington	Cedar Rapids Kennedy	Ames
1971	Cedar Rapids Washington	Des Moines Hoover	Ames
1972	Cedar Rapids Washington	Ames	Ames
1973	Cedar Rapids Washington	Davenport West	Ames
1974	Cedar Rapids Washington	Ames	Ames
1975	Mason City	Ames	Ames
1976	Cedar Rapids Washington	Mason City	Ames
1977	Cedar Rapids Washington	Bettendorf	Ames
1978	Bettendorf	Mason City	Ames
1979	Mason City	Cedar Rapids Washington	Ames
1980	Cedar Rapids Washington	Valley, West Des Moines	Ames
1981	Cedar Rapids Kennedy	Bettendorf	Ames
1982	Ames	Cedar Rapids Washington	Fort Dodge
1983	Cedar Rapids Washington	Bettendorf	Iowa City
1984	Valley, West Des Moines	Bettendorf	Ames
1985	Cedar Rapids Washington	Bettendorf	Fort Dodge
1986	Bettendorf	Cedar Rapids Washington	Iowa City
1987	Cedar Rapids Washington	Valley, West Des Moines	Iowa City
1988	Cedar Rapids Washington	Valley, West Des Moines	Iowa City
1989	Cedar Rapids Washington	Mason City	Iowa City
1990	Cedar Rapids Washington	Mason City	Iowa City
1991	Mason City	Cedar Rapids Washington	Iowa City
1992	Cedar Rapids Washington	Cedar Falls	Iowa City
1993	Cedar Falls	Dowling Catholic, West Des Moines	Iowa City
1994	Cedar Rapids Washington	Dowling Catholic, West Des Moines	Iowa City
1995	Cedar Rapids Washington	Ames	Iowa City
1996	Cedar Rapids Washington	Dowling Catholic, West Des Moines	Iowa City
1997	Cedar Rapids Washington	Bettendorf	Iowa City
1998	Cedar Falls	Cedar Rapids Washington	Iowa City
1999	Bettendorf	Dowling Catholic, West Des Moines	Iowa City
2000	Dowling Catholic, West Des Moines	Bettendorf	Iowa City
2001	Dowling Catholic, West Des Moines	Ames	Iowa City
2002	Dowling Catholic, West Des Moines	Ames	Iowa City
2003	Dowling Catholic, West Des Moines	Ames	Iowa City
2004	Cedar Falls	Dowling Catholic, West Des Moines	Iowa City
2005	Cedar Falls	Valley, West Des Moines	Marshalltown
2006	Cedar Falls	Cedar Rapids Washington	Marshalltown
2007	Bettendorf	Cedar Rapids Washington	Marshalltown
2008	Cedar Rapids Washington	Bettendorf	Marshalltown
2009	Dubuque Senior	Ames	Marshalltown
2010	Valley, West Des Moines	Dowling Catholic, West Des Moines	Marshalltown
2011	Muscatine	Dubuque Senior	Marshalltown
2012	Muscatine	Dowling Catholic, West Des Moines	Marshalltown
2013	Muscatine	Dubuque Senior	Marshalltown
2014	Iowa City West	Cedar Rapids Washington	Marshalltown
2015	Iowa City West	Cedar Rapids Washington	Marshalltown
2016	Waukee	Iowa City West	Marshalltown
2017	Waukee	Johnston	Marshalltown
2018	Ames	Valley, West Des Moines	University of Iowa
2019	Ankeny	Waukee	University of Iowa
2020	Iowa City West	Ankeny	University of Iowa
2021	Waukee	Ankeny	Linn-Mar
2022	Waukee	Iowa City West	University of Iowa
2023	Waukee	Valley, West Des Moines	University of Iowa
2024	Valley, West Des Moines	Waukee	University of Iowa
2025	Dubuque Hempstead	Iowa City, West	Iowa City
2026	Iowa City, West	Linn-Mar	University of Iowa

== Tennis ==
An IHSAA tennis team consists of 6 competitors. Each head-to-head competition is made of 6 singles and 3 doubles, each worth 1 point, and the first team to 5 points is the winner. Both singles and doubles matches are in a best-of-3-sets format. With a 10-point tiebreaker in the 3rd in most cases.

=== Classification guidelines ===
- 2A- Largest 48
- 1A- Remaining schools

=== State Champions ===
==== Timeline ====
- 1929–1977 – one singles and one doubles championship awarded
- 1978–present – two singles and two doubles championships awarded, one in each of 2 classes (1A and 2A)
- 1983–present – two team championships awarded, one in each of 2 classes (1A and 2A)

Iowa State Tennis Team Champions
Year	2A	1A
1983	Cedar Rapids, Washington	Camanche
1984	Dubuque, Hempstead	Camanche
1985	Valley, West Des Moines	Camanche
1986	Valley, West Des Moines	Camanche
1987	Cedar Rapids, Washington	Denison
1988	Linn-Mar	Camanche
1989	Wahlert Catholic, Dubuque	Camanche
1990	Cedar Rapids, Washington	Camanche
1991	Waterloo, West	Maharishi, Fairfield
1992	Dowling Catholic, West Des Moines	Camanche
1993	Valley, West Des Moines	Keokuk
1994	Cedar Rapids, Washington	Pella Christian
1995	Iowa City, West	Camanche
1996	Cedar Rapids, Washington	Decorah
1997	Urbandale	Decorah
1998	Dubuque, Senior	Decorah
1999	Iowa City, City High	Maharishi, Fairfield
2000	Des Moines, Roosevelt	Maharishi, Fairfield
2001	Dowling Catholic, West Des Moines	Knoxville
2002	Des Moines, Roosevelt	Maharishi, Fairfield
2003	Ankeny	Red Oak
2004	Bettendorf	Wahlert Catholic, Dubuque
2005	Iowa City, West	Wahlert Catholic, Dubuque
2006	Iowa City, West	Wahlert Catholic, Dubuque
2007	Davenport, Central	Wahlert Catholic, Dubuque
2008	Cedar Rapids, Kennedy	Wahlert Catholic, Dubuque
2009	Des Moines, Roosevelt	Wahlert Catholic, Dubuque
2010	Valley, West Des Moines	Columbus Catholic, Waterloo
2011	Ames	Wahlert Catholic, Dubuque
2012	Iowa City, West	Assumption Catholic, Davenport
2013	Iowa City, West	St. Edmond Catholic, Fort Dodge
2014	Iowa City, West	Maharishi, Fairfield
2015	Linn-Mar, Marion	Decorah
2016	Iowa City, West	Wahlert Catholic, Dubuque
2017	Iowa City, West	Xavier Catholic, Cedar Rapids
2018	Linn-Mar, Marion	Wahlert Catholic, Dubuque
2019	Iowa City, West	Xavier Catholic, Cedar Rapids
2021	Waukee	Xavier Catholic, Cedar Rapids
2022	Iowa City, West	Xavier Catholic, Cedar Rapids
2023	Iowa City, West	Xavier Catholic, Cedar Rapids
2024	Waukee, Northwest	Wahlert Catholic, Dubuque
2025	Waukee Northwest	Xavier Catholic
2026	Waukee Northwest	Xavier Catholic

== Track and Field ==
Iowa's official track season is currently outdoors. There was also an indoor State Track Meet from 1926 to 1973, and the IHSAA is in the process of collecting and publishing these champions.

=== Classification guidelines ===
- 4A- Largest 48 schools
- 3A- Next 64 largest schools
- 2A- Next 96 largest schools
- 1A- Remaining schools

=== List of events ===
The following is the current list of official track events according to the IHSAA

Track:

- 100 meter dash
- 200 meter dash
- 400 meter dash
- 800 meter run
- 1600 meter run
- 3200 meter run
- 110 meter hurdles
- 400 meter hurdles
- 4 × 100 meter relay
- 4 × 200 meter relay
- 4 × 400 meter relay
- 4 × 800 meter relay
- 800 meter sprint Medley relay
- 1600 meter distance Medley relay
- 4 × 110 meter hurdle shuttle relay

Field:

- High jump
- Long jump
- Discus throw
- Shot put

Wheel Chair:

- 100 meter run wheelchair
- 200 meter run wheelchair
- 400 meter run wheelchair
- Shot put wheelchair

=== State Champions ===
State track titles have been given every year since 1906. Since 2003, there has also been wheelchair events at the state meet. A separate wheelchair team championship is also awarded. In 2005, the wheelchair championship has been co-ed.

Iowa State Outdoor Track & Field Champions
Year	4A/AA	3A/A	2A/B	1A/CD
1906	Ida Grove			
1907	Ida Grove			
1908	Des Moines, West			
1909	Des Moines, East			
1910	Des Moines, West			
1911	Des Moines, West			
1912	Des Moines, West			
1913	Des Moines, West			
1914	Des Moines, West			
1915	Des Moines, East			
1916	Des Moines, West			
1917	Des Moines, East			
1918	Mason City			
1919	Des Moines, North			
1920	Sioux City			
1921	Cedar Rapids			
1922	Cedar Rapids			
1923	Cedar Rapids			
1924	Cedar Rapids			
1925	Cedar Rapids			
1926	Des Moines, East			
1927	Carroll			
1928	Des Moines, East			
1929	Mason City			
1930	Mason City			
1931	Davenport			
1932	Clinton			
1933	Clinton			
1934	Des Moines, North			
1935	Davenport			
1936	Des Moines, East			
1937	Dubuque			
1938	Des Moines, East			
1939	Des Moines, East			
1940	Des Moines, East			
1941	Ames			
1942	Davenport			
1943	Des Moines, East			
1944	Des Moines, East			
1945	Sioux City, East			
1946	(tie) Clinton (tie) Des Moines, Roosevelt			
1947	Davenport			
1948		Des Moines, North	Cedar Falls, Teachers	
1949		Ames	Nevada	
1950		Des Moines, East	Nevada	
1951		Des Moines, East	DeWitt	
1952		Davenport	(tie) Lake City (tie) Lamoni	
1953	Des Moines, North	Red Oak	DeWitt	Toledo Juvenile Home
1954	Des Moines, North	Harlan	Lake City	Elliott
1955	Ames	Valley, West Des Moines	Lake City	Council Bluffs-Iowa School for the Deaf
1956	Ames	Clarinda	Anamosa	Primghar
1957	Ames	Dewitt	Carroll	Farragut
1958	Ames	Indianola	Tabor	Wall Lake
1959	Des Moines, North	Clarion	St. Mary's Catholic, Clinton	West Chester
1960	Ames	Belmond	English Valleys	Lu Verne
1961	Des Moines, Tech	Clarion	Maurice-Orange City	Sioux Rapids
1962	Cedar Rapids, Jefferson	Perry	Paullina	Moville
1963	Ames	Winterset	George	Moville
1964	Ames	Eagle Grove	Seymour	Dexfield
1965	Ames	Eagle Grove	Farragut	Pomeroy
1966	Sioux City, Central	Cherokee, Washington	Villisca	Treynor
1967	Sioux City, Central	Winterset	Villisca	Terril
1968	Ames	Spirit Lake	Prairie	Goldfield
1969	Clinton	Ankeny	Belle Plaine	Miles
1970	Clinton	Eagle Grove	(tie) Boyden-Hull (tie) West Harrison	Woodward-Granger
1971	Ames	Eagle Grove	Belle Plain	Pocahontas
1972	Ames	Ankeny	Alta	Central Webster
1973	Davenport, Central	Red Oak	Maurice-Orange City	Terril
1974	Davenport, Central	(tie) Anamosa (tie) Iowa Falls	Britt	Hamburg
1975	Cedar Rapids, Washington	Anamosa	Corning	Hamburg
1976	Davenport, Central	Nevada	Corning	Hamburg
1977	Cedar Rapids, Washington	Nevada	Corning	(tie) Hamburg (tie) Y-J-B
1978	Davenport, Central	Iowa Falls	Kingsley-Pierson	Kanawha
1979	Waterloo, East	Iowa Falls	Pekin	Kanawha
1980	Ames	Davis County	Sioux Center	Trenynor
1981	Waterloo, West	Davis County	NU High, Cedar Falls	Paullina
1982	Davenport, Central	Sheldon	Sioux Center	(tie) BCLUW (tie) New Hartford
1983	Davenport, Central	Tipton	West Branch	Allison-Bristow
1984	Davenport, Central	Tipton	West Branch	Sidney
1985	Marshalltown	Tipton	Iowa Valley	(tie) Earlham (tie) Lone Tree
1986	Ames	Pella	NU High, Cedar Falls	Paton-Churdan
1987	Ames	(tie) Storm Lake (tie) Turkey Valley	NU High, Cedar Falls	CAL
1988	Ames	Storm Lake	NU High, Cedar Falls	Sanborn
1989	Ames	Glenwood	Gehlen Catholic, Le Mars	Woodbine
1990	Ames	Glenwood	NU High, Cedar Falls	North Mahaska
1991	Ames	Knoxville	NU High, Cedar Falls	Lawton-Bronson
1992	Iowa City, City High	Spirit Lake	West Hancock	(tie) Fredericksburg (tie) Woodbine
1993	Iowa City, City High	Algona	St. Albert Catholic, Council Bluffs	West Bend-Mallard
1994	Iowa City, City High	Cherokee, Washington	Ballard	West Bend-Mallard
1995	Iowa City, City High	Humboldt	Iowa Falls	Van Buren
1996	Iowa City, City High	Centerville	Garner-Hayfield	Gehlen Catholic, Le Mars
1997	Iowa City, City High	Bishop Heelan Catholic, Sioux City	(tie) Beckman Catholic, Dyersville (tie) Unity Christian, Orange City	Panorama
1998	Valley, West Des Moines	Washington	Monticello	NU High, Cedar Falls
1999	(tie) Des Moines, Roosevelt (tie) Iowa City, City High	Waverly-Shell Rock	Beckman Catholic, Dyersville	Iowa Mennonite School, Kalona
2000	Iowa City, City High	Mount Pleasant	(tie) Unity Christian, Orange City (tie) West Lyon	East Buchanan
2001	Iowa City, City High	Waverly-Shell Rock	Tri-Center	Madrid
2002	Iowa City, City High	Storm Lake	Williamsburg	Madrid
2003	Valley, West Des Moines	Harlan	Okoboji	St. Albert Catholic, Council Bluffs
2004	Iowa City, City High	Decorah/North Winneshiek	Mount Vernon	Treynor
2005	Davenport, Central	Charles City	Starmont	Griswold
2006	Valley, West Des Moines	Wahlert Catholic, Dubuque	North Fayette	BCLUW
2007	Iowa City, West	Xavier Catholic, Cedar Rapids	Monticello	West Hancock
2008	Pleasant Valley	Xavier Catholic, Cedar Rapids	Mid-Prairie	West Hancock
2009	Cedar Rapids, Washington	Central Clinton	St. Edmond Catholic, Fort Dodge	Madrid
2010	Cedar Rapids, Washington	Bishop Heelan Catholic, Sioux City	Solon	Madrid
2011	Cedar Falls	Glenwood	St. Edmond Catholic, Fort Dodge	Madrid
2012	Iowa City, West	Decorah	West Marshall	Manson-Northwest Webster
2013	Linn-Mar	Pella	Monticello	Manson-Northwest Webster
2014	Waukee	Solon	Monticello	Mount Ayr
2015	Waukee	Center Point-Urbana	West Burlington/Notre Dame Catholic, Burlington	Lisbon
2016	Prairie, Cedar Rapids	Pella	West Burlington/Notre Dame Catholic, Burlington	Lisbon
2017	Valley, West Des Moines	Marion	(tie) KP-WC (tie) Madrid	Lisbon
2018	Valley, West Des Moines	Marion	Pekin	St. Albert Catholic, Council Bluffs
2019	Valley, West Des Moines	Sergeant Bluff-Luton	Dike-New Hartford	George-Little Rock
2020	Season Cancelled Due to COVID-19			
2021	Cedar Falls	Pella	Underwood	Madrid
2022	Dowling Catholic, West Des Moines	Dallas Center-Grimes	Spirit Lake	New London
2023	Johnston	Pella	(tie) Mediapolis (tie) Williamsburg	Lisbon
2024	Ankeny	Epworth, Western Dubuque	Mediapolis	Lisbon
2025	Ankeny	Pella	(tie) Spirit Lake (tie) Okoboji, Milford	Lisbon
2026	Cedar Falls	Newton	Alburnett	Riverside, Oak

Iowa State Track Wheelchair Team Champions
Year	Champion
2003	Marshalltown
2004	English Valleys
2005*	Aplington-Parkersburg
2006*	Aplington-Parkersburg
2007*	Aplington-Parkersburg
2008	Interstate 35
2009	Interstate 35
2010	Waterloo, West
2011	Waterloo, West
2012	Linn-Mar
2013	Waterloo, West
2014	Camanche
2015	Woodbine
2016	(tie) Independence (tie) Roland-Story
2017	(tie) Bondurant-Farrar (tie) Southeast Polk
2018	Waukee
2019	Waukee
2021	Waukee
2022	Cedar Falls
2023	Bedford
2024	Mid-Prairie
2025	Siouxland Christian
2026	(tie) Shenandoah (tie) Maquoketa
*Co-ed champion

== Wrestling ==
=== Classification guidelines ===
- 3A- Largest 64 schools
- 2A- Next 96 largest schools
- 1A- Remaining schools

=== Weight classifications ===
- 106 pounds
- 113 pounds
- 120 pounds
- 126 pounds
- 132 pounds
- 138 pounds
- 144 pounds
- 150 pounds
- 157 pounds
- 165 pounds
- 175 pounds
- 190 pounds
- 215 pounds
- 285 pounds

=== State Champions ===
The Iowa High School Athletic Association holds two separate team wrestling championships: the Traditional tournament, which also crowns individual champions, and a Dual Team tournament. The dual team tournament was held at the U.S. Cellular Center in Cedar Rapids a week after the traditional tournament, until 2012, when it was held the Wednesday before the traditional tournament in Des Moines. This was the subject of much controversy, as several teams sat their state qualifiers for the Dual Team tournament. In 1921–1925, the State University of Iowa (Iowa City) and Iowa State University (Ames) held open state tournaments that were not supervised nor sanctioned by the IHSAA.

Iowa State Wrestling Team Champions
Year	Class	Champion
1921*	Ames	Cedar Rapids, Washington
1922*	Ames; Iowa City	Mason City; Marshalltown
1923*	Ames; Iowa City	Boone; Ottumwa
1924*	Ames; Iowa City	Boone; Marshalltown
1925*	Ames; Iowa City	Boone; Marshalltown
1926		Marshalltown
1927		Fort Dodge
1928		Cresco
1929		Fort Dodge
1930		Fort Dodge
1931		(tie) Eldora Training School (tie) Fort Dodge
1932		Fort Dodge
1933		(tie) Cresco (tie) New Hampton
1934		Fort Dodge
1935		Cresco
1936		Fort Dodge
1937		Fort Dodge
1938		Clarion
1939		Cherokee
1940		Osage
1941		Fort Dodge
1942		Waterloo, West
1943		Waterloo, West
1944		Waterloo, West
1945		Waterloo, West
1946		Waterloo, West
1947		Clarion
1948		Cresco
1949		Mason City
1950		Mason City
1951		Waterloo, West
1952		Waterloo, West
1953		Waterloo, East
1954		Davenport
1955		Waterloo, West
1956		Davenport
1957	A B	Waterloo, East; New Hampton
1958	A B	Waterloo, East; Cresco
1959	A B	Waterloo, West; New Hampton
1960	A B	Waterloo, East; Cresco Crestwood
1961	A B	Waterloo, East; Britt
1962	A B	Cedar Rapids, Jefferson; Britt
1963	A B	Waterloo, East; New Hampton
1964	AA; A	Waterloo, East; Cresco Crestwood
1965	AA; A	Waterloo, West; Osage
1966	AA; A	Waterloo, West; Algona
1967	AA; A	Waterloo, West; Harlan
1968	AA; A	Cedar Falls; Humboldt
1969	AAA; AA; A	Waterloo, West; Algona; Eldora
1970	AAA; AA; A	Cedar Rapids, Washington; Algona; Adel
1971	AAA; AA; A	Waterloo, West; Arkeny; Britt
1972	AAA; AA; A	Waterloo, West; Algona; Britt
1973	AAA; AA; A	Cedar Rapids, Jefferson; Britt; Lisbon
1974	AAA; AA; A	Cedar Rapids, Jefferson; Eagle Grove; Lisbon
1975	AAA; AA; A	Dowling Catholic, West Des Moines; Algona; Lisbon
1976	3A; 2A; 1A	Cedar Falls; Emmetsburg; Belle Plaine
1977	3A; 2A; 1A	Waterloo, West; Emmetsburg; Lisbon
1978	3A; 2A; 1A	Dowling Catholic, West Des Moines; Emmetsburg; Lisbon
1979	3A; 2A; 1A	Prairie, Cedar Rapids; Emmetsburg; Don Bosco Catholic, Gilbertville
1980	3A; 2A; 1A	Fort Dodge; Algona; Lisbon
1981	3A; 2A; 1A	Bettendorf; Osage; Don Bosco Catholic, Gilbertville
1982	3A; 2A; 1A	Bettendorf; Emmetsburg; Lisbon
1983	3A; 2A; 1A	Waterloo, East; Clarion; Lisbon
1984	3A; 2A; 1A	Dowling Catholic, West Des Moines; Griswold; Dallas Center-Grimes
1985	3A; 2A; 1A	Fort Dodge; Emmetsburg; Don Bosco Catholic, Gilbertville
1986	3A; 2A; 1A	Charles City; Eagle Grove; Lisbon
1987	3A; 2A; 1A	Clinton; Eagle Grove; Don Bosco Catholic, Gilbertville
1988	3A; 2A; 1A	Dowling Catholic, West Des Moines; Centerville; Lisbon
1989	3A; 2A; 1A	Waterloo, West; Glenwood; Lisbon
1990	3A; 2A; 1A	Dowling Catholic, West Des Moines; New Hampton; Lisbon
1991	3A; 2A; 1A	Dowling Catholic, West Des Moines; West Delaware; Clarksville
1992	3A; 2A; 1A	Iowa City, City High; Wapello; Lisbon
1993	3A; 2A; 1A	Cedar Falls; New Hampton; Lisbon
1994	3A; 2A; 1A	Indianola; Clarinda; Riceville
1995	3A; 2A; 1A	Prairie, Cedar Rapids; Assumption Catholic, Davenport; Columbus Community
1996	3A; 2A; 1A	Urbandale; Independence; Riverside
1997	3A; 2A; 1A	Cedar Falls; Columbus Community; Wilton
1998	3A; 2A; 1A	Cedar Falls; Assumption Catholic, Davenport; Bondurant-Farrar
1999	3A; 2A; 1A	Iowa City, City High; Assumption Catholic, Davenport; Underwood
2000	3A; 2A; 1A	Lewis Central; Emmetsburg/Armstrong-Ringsted; Underwood
2001	3A; 2A; 1A	Lewis Central; Emmetsburg/Armstrong-Ringsted; Belle Plaine
2002	3A; 2A; 1A	Iowa City, City High; Emmetsburg/Armstrong-Ringsted; Wilton
2003	3A; 2A; 1A	Oskaloosa; Emmetsburg/Armstrong-Ringsted; Hudson
2004	3A; 2A; 1A	Lewis Central; Columbus Catholic, Waterloo; Hudson
2005	3A; 2A; 1A	Waverly-Shell Rock; Emmetsburg/Armstrong-Ringsted; Logan-Magnolia
2006	3A; 2A; 1A	Iowa City, West; Emmetsburg/Armstrong-Ringsted; Don Bosco Catholic, Gilbertville
2007	3A; 2A; 1A	Iowa City, West; Creston/Orient-Macksburg; Don Bosco Catholic, Gilbertville
2008	3A; 2A; 1A	Waverly Shell-Rock; Ballard; Don Bosco Catholic, Gilbertville
2009	3A; 2A; 1A	Waverly Shell-Rock; Ballard; Don Bosco Catholic, Gilbertville
2010	3A; 2A; 1A	Waverly-Shell Rock; Denver/Tripoli; Don Bosco Catholic, Gilbertville
2011	3A; 2A; 1A	Waverly-Shell Rock; Assumption Catholic, Davenport; Logan-Magnolia
2012	3A; 2A; 1A	Bettendorf; Denver/Tripoli; Don Bosco Catholic, Gilbertville
2013	3A; 2A; 1A	Southeast Polk; West Delaware; Alburnett
2014	3A; 2A; 1A	Bettendorf; Assumption Catholic, Davenport; Eddyville-Blakesburg-Fremont
2015	3A; 2A; 1A	Southeast Polk; Mediapolis; Alburnett
2016	3A; 2A; 1A	Southeast Polk; Creston/Orient-Macksburg; Alburnett
2017	3A; 2A; 1A	Southeast Polk; Solon; Lisbon
2018	3A; 2A; 1A	Fort Dodge; Wahlert Catholic, Dubuque; Lisbon
2019	3A; 2A; 1A	Waverly-Shell Rock; West Delaware; Don Bosco Catholic, Gilbertville
2020	3A; 2A; 1A	Waverly-Shell Rock; Osage; Don Bosco Catholic, Gilbertville
2021	3A; 2A; 1A	Waverly-Shell Rock; West Delaware; Don Bosco Catholic, Gilbertville
2022	3A; 2A; 1A	Southeast Polk; Notre Dame Catholic, Burlington; Don Bosco Catholic, Gilbertville
2023	3A; 2A; 1A	Waverly-Shell Rock; Osage; Don Bosco Catholic, Gilbertville
2024	3A; 2A; 1A	Southeast Polk; Osage; Don Bosco Catholic, Gilbertville
2025	3A; 2A; 1A	Southeast Polk; Notre Dame Catholic, Burlington; Don Bosco Catholic, Gilbertville
2025	3A; 2A 1A	Southeast Polk (tie) Decorah (tie) Eddyville-Blakesburg-Fremont; Don Bosco Catholic, Gilbertville
*Championship not IHSAA supervised or sanctioned

Iowa State Team Dual Champions
Year	1A	2A	3A
1987	Lisbon	Eagle Grove	Dowling Catholic, West Des Moines
1988	Lisbon	Mount Vernon	Dowling Catholic, West Des Moines
1989	Clarksville	Osage	Dowling Catholic, West Des Moines
1990	Clarskville	New Hampton	Dowling Catholic, West Des Moines
1991	Lisbon	West Delaware	Dowling Catholic, West Des Moines
1992	Eagle Grove	Humboldt & Osage (tie)	Dowling Catholic, West Des Moines
1993	Wilton	New Hampton	Cedar Falls
1994	Riceville	Winterset	Prairie, Cedar Rapids
1995	Don Bosco Catholic, Gilbertville	Assumption Catholic, Davenport	Pleasant Valley
1996	Columbus Community	Assumption Catholic, Davenport	Urbandale
1997	Bondurant-Farrar	Independence	Pleasant Valley
1998	Columbus Community	Assumption Catholic, Davenport	Prairie, Cedar Rapids
1999	Columbus Community	Assumption Catholic, Davenport	Iowa City, City High
2000	Lake Mills	Emmetsburg/Armstrong-Ringsted	Lewis Central
2001	Belle Plaine	Osage	Lewis Central
2002	Don Bosco Catholic, Gilbertville	South Tama County	Iowa City, City High
2003	Logan-Magnolia	Emmetsburg/Armstrong-Ringsted	Iowa City, West
2004	Nashua-Plainfield	Union	Iowa City, West
2005	Don Bosco Catholic, Gilbertville	New Hampton	Waverly-Shell Rock
2006	Don Bosco Catholic, Gilbertville	Osage	Iowa City, West
2007	Don Bosco Catholic, Gilbertville	Creston/Orient-Macksburg	Iowa City, West
2008	Don Bosco Catholic, Gilbertville	Ballard	Waverly-Shell Rock
2009	Don Bosco Catholic, Gilbertville	Ballard	Waverly-Shell Rock
2010	Don Bosco Catholic, Gilbertville	Denver/Tripoli	Waverly-Shell Rock
2011	Logan-Magnolia	Assumption Catholic, Davenport	Iowa City, West
2012	Nashua-Plainfield	Assumption Catholic, Davenport	Bettendorf
2013	Alburnett	Assumption Catholic, Davenport	Southeast Polk
2014	Clarion-Goldfield	Assumption Catholic, Davenport	Bettendorf
2015	Clarion-Goldfield-Dows	Union	Southeast Polk
2016	Alburnett	Assumption Catholic, Davenport	Valley, West Des Moines
2017	Lisbon	New Hampton	Southeast Polk
2018	Don Bosco Catholic, Gilbertville	New Hampton/Turkey Valley	Fort Dodge
2019	Don Bosco Catholic, Gilbertville	West Delaware	Southeast Polk
2020	Lisbon	West Delaware	Southeast Polk
2021	Don Bosco Catholic, Gilbertville	West Delaware	Waverly-Shell Rock
2022	Don Bosco Catholic, Gilbertville	West Delaware	Waverly-Shell Rock
2023	Don Bosco Catholic, Gilbertville	Osage	Waverly-Shell Rock
2024	Don Bosco Catholic, Gilbertville	Creston	Southeast Polk
2025	Don Bosco Catholic, Gilbertville	Algona	Southeast Polk
2026	Don Bosco Catholic, Gilbertville	Eddyville-Blakesburg-Fremont	Southeast Polk

== Broadcasting ==
=== Iowa High School Sports Network (IHSSN) ===
Since 2005, the Iowa High School Sports Network (IHSSN) has broadcast numerous Iowa High School state tournaments. In September 2024, the Iowa High School Sports Network (IHSSN) released its broadcast map with its network on the following stations: Des Moines (Central Iowa) KDSM Fox 17.1; Omaha & Council Bluffs (Southwest Iowa) NPTM 42.2 (KPTM is both Fox 42.1 and The CW 42.3 in the Omaha broadcasting area); Sioux City (Northwest Iowa) NPTH 44.2 (KMEG 14 is both Fox 44.1 and CBS 44.3 in the Souixland broadcasting area.); Rochester, Minnesota, & Mason City (North Central Iowa) KXLT Fox 47.1 or MeTV 47.2; Cedar Rapids (Northeast Iowa) KFXA (Dabl) 28.1; and Moline, Illinois, & Quad Cities (Southeast Iowa) WQAD MyTV 8.3.

=== Prior to 2016 ===
Prior to 2016, championship events in football, basketball and wrestling were carried across the state of Iowa on a network made up of local television stations.

=== Beginning in 2016 ===
Beginning with the 2016 football championships, IHSAA reached a deal with NBCUniversal-owned Comcast SportsNet Chicago to become the exclusive provider of these sports, making them available across CSN's footprint consisting of Iowa, Illinois and Indiana via television, online and the NBC Sports mobile app.
