= Big East Conference (Iowa) =

Former Iowa High School athletic conference

The Big East Conference was a high school athletic conference in Eastern Iowa. The conference was made up of primarily 1A and 2A schools (the smallest two classifications of schools in Iowa). There were nine teams in the conference, spanning from Lisbon in Linn County to the Mississippi River, in its final incarnation.

At its peak in the early 2000s, the Big East Conference had 14 schools, but due to consolidations, school closings and changes in conference affiliation, membership soon dropped, and in its final year as a conference had nine members. Following the 2012–13 school year, the conference was dissolved, with its schools being split up between two leagues.

== Members ==
This was the final lineup:

Institution	Location	Mascot	Colors	Affiliation	9–12 enrollment
Bellevue	Bellevue	Comets		Public	216
Calamus–Wheatland	Wheatland	Warriors		Public	166
Camanche	Camanche	Indians		Public	290
Lisbon	Lisbon	Lions		Public	161
Marquette Catholic	Bellevue	Defenders		Private	87
Midland	Wyoming	Eagles		Public	147
Northeast	Goose Lake	Rebels		Public	221
Preston (consolidated into Easton Valley)	Preston	Trojans		Public	111
Prince of Peace Preparatory	Clinton	Irish		Private	81

== Sports ==
The Big East Conference offered the following 11 sports:

- Fall — volleyball, boys' cross-country and girls' cross-country.
- Winter — boys' basketball and girls' basketball.
- Spring — boys' track and field, girls' track and field, boys' golf and girls' golf.
- Summer — baseball and softball.

Many of the conference's schools had football programs; however, they were assigned to a district schedule in lieu of a round-robin conference schedule. Additionally, some schools had 8-man programs and others 11-man.

Although the member schools field freshman-sophomore — and in some cases, junior varsity — teams in many of the above-mentioned sports, conference championships were determined at varsity levels only. In some cases, a school participated in a cooperative program with neighboring schools for a given sport while other schools offered the sport as a stand-alone program (such as wrestling). Additionally, several of the schools offered other sports programs, such as bowling and tennis, but not on a conference basis.

== History ==
The Big East was founded in 1993 from the merger of the Wapsie Conference and the Mid-East Conference. Competition began with the 1993–94 academic year. Many of the Mid-East Conference schools had split from the Wapsie Conference around 1980 to form a conference that sponsored all sports, including football. Prior to that point, the Mid-East had served as a conference for football only for eight schools. After Guttenberg left the conference the Iowa High School Athletic Association implemented district football for sub-Class 4A schools, the Mid-East decided to pursue a merger. The Wapsie, which had struggled for years, approved the merger and the new conference was formed.

Originally a 14 team league, the Big East saw the following membership changes:

- In 1997, Lincoln (based in Stanwood) merged with Clarence-Lowden (to eventually become the North Cedar Community School District).
- In 2000, Clinton Mater Dei changed its name to Prince of Peace Preparatory.
- When the Big Bend Conference folded in 2003, Camanche applied for membership into the Big East. Although originally denied, Camanche ended up becoming the 14th member of the conference.
- Following the 2004–05 school year, Bennett entered into a whole-grade sharing agreement with Durant, an agreement that would eventually see Bennett sharing all high school activities with Durant. The closure of Bennett High School left the conference with 13 schools.
- In 2008, when North Cedar—one of the conference's largest schools—agreed to join the newly formed Cedar Valley Conference with seven former members of the Eastern Iowa Hawkeye Conference.
- For the 2011–12 school year, only nine of the current 12 members returned. Andrew and East Central each closed their schools, with Andrew entering into a sharing agreement with Bellevue and Maquoketa high schools and East Central sending their students to Northeast of Goose Lake or Preston. Olin discontinued its entire athletic program, with the district entering into shared programs with nearby schools including Midland and Monticello.

During the early 2010s, Camanche began petitioning to leave the Big East for a new conference, citing enrollment and inability to schedule junior varsity games against the league's smallest schools; eventually, Bellevue and Northeast also began efforts to seek a new home. The Cedar Valley Conference, a league made up of similarly sized schools to the three, was Camanche's first choice. However, member schools of the CVC objected, citing travel distances, and the Iowa Department of Education was eventually asked to help resolve the dilemma. On February 21, 2012, a mediation team appointed by the Department of Education – which included representatives of the Iowa High School Athletic Association and Iowa Girls High School Athletic Union – recommended the dissolution of the Big East Conference; the moving of Bellevue, Camanche and Northeast (along with the CVC's North Cedar) to a new, yet-to-be-named conference, which would become the River Valley Conference; and the moving of the smaller Big East schools to the Tri-Rivers Conference.

On May 29, the Iowa Department of Education ordered the dissolution of the Big East Conference following the 2012–13 school year, but instead placed Bellevue, Camanche and Northeast into the CVC (while keeping North Cedar in the league and adding Cascade and Monticello). Bellevue Marquette, Calamus–Wheatland, Clinton Prince of Peace, Lisbon, Midland and Preston were added to the Tri-Rivers Conference.
