= River Valley Conference (Iowa) =

Iowa High School athletic conference

- Conference: IHSAA / IGHSAU
- Founded: 2013
- Sports fielded: 20; men's: 10; women's: 10
- No. of teams: 17
- Region: Eastern Iowa
- Website: www.rivervalleyconference.org

The River Valley Conference (RVC) is a high school athletic conference whose members are located in smaller communities in eastern Iowa. The conference roughly spans from Johnson County, Iowa to the southwest, to Dubuque County, Iowa to the northeast. The RVC was founded in the 2013-2014 school year.

== Member Schools ==
There are 17 full members of the River Valley Conference. Most of those schools are in Class 2A, Iowa's second smallest enrollment class. Lisbon joined the conference in the 2026-2027 school year to bring the total to the current 17 schools.

Institution	Location	Mascot	Colors	Affiliation	2026-2027 BEDS
North Division
Alburnett	Alburnett	Pirates		Public	206 ▼
Anamosa	Anamosa	Blue Raiders		Public	278 ▼
Beckman Catholic	Dyersville	Trail Blazers		Private	164 ▼
Bellevue	Bellevue	Comets		Public	145 ▼
Camanche	Camanche	Storm		Public	212 ▼
Cascade, Western Dubuque	Cascade	Cougars		Public	180 ▼
Maquoketa	Maquoketa	Cardinals		Public	323 ▼
Monticello	Monticello	Panthers		Public	230 ▼
Northeast	Goose Lake	Rebels		Public	204 ▲
South Division
Durant	Durant	Wildcats		Public	154 ▼
Lisbon	Lisbon	Lions		Public	139 ▼
Mid-Prairie	Wellman	Golden Hawks		Public	266 ▼
Regina Catholic	Iowa City	Regals		Private	202 ▲
Tipton	Tipton	Tigers		Public	214 ▼
West Branch	West Branch	Bears		Public	212 ▲
West Liberty	West Liberty	Comets		Public	208 ▼
Wilton	Wilton	Beavers		Public	215 ▼

== Sports ==
The school fields athletic teams in 20 sports, including:

- Summer: Baseball and softball.
- Fall: Volleyball, boys' and girls' swimming, and boys' and girls' cross country.
- Winter: Boys' and girls' basketball, boys' and girls' bowling, and wrestling.
- Spring: Boys' and girls' track and field; boys' and girls' tennis, boys' and girls' soccer, and boys' and girls' golf.

Although the member schools field freshman — and in some cases, junior varsity — teams in many of the above-mentioned sports, conference championships are determined at varsity levels only. Some schools do not offer all 21 sports. Bowling, Soccer, Swimming and Tennis are the most common exclusions.

== History ==
The River Valley Conference traces its history to 2008, when it was formed as the Cedar Valley Conference. That year, the seven original schools left the former Eastern Iowa Hawkeye Conference, which was dissolved. Four member schools from the old EIHC — Clear Creek-Amana, Mount Vernon, Solon and Williamsburg — were growing in size and placed in the WaMaC Conference. The seven remaining schools joined North Cedar High School, (which had been in the Big East Conference) in forming the new CVC.

Starting with the 2013-2014 school year, former Big East members Bellevue, Camanche and Northeast were placed in the CVC, along with Cascade and Monticello. The events that eventually resulted in the changes began in the early 2010s, when Camanche began petitioning to leave the Big East for the CVC, and CVC member schools denied them admission, citing travel distances. The Iowa Department of Education eventually was asked to help resolve the dilemma. Not all CVC athletic directors and coaches welcomed the Iowa Department of Education's decision, expressing concerns about travel distances, loss of classroom time and gate receipts for some contests.

As a result of the changes, the CVC was renamed the River Valley Conference for the 2013-2014 school year.

In January 2017, Anamosa, a member of the WaMaC Conference, announced it would be joining the RVC, effective in 2018-2019, bringing the league to 14 schools.

In the late summer of 2021, it was expected that two more WaMaC members – Maquoketa and Dyersville Beckman Catholic – would join the RVC, after both schools announced their intention to leave their current conference. When the move took place for the 2022-2023 school year, North Cedar also left for the Tri-Rivers Conference, bringing the league total to 15 competitors.

In the fall of 2025, Alburnett, formerly a member of the Tri-Rivers Conference, joined the River Valley Conference as its 16th member. Lisbon followed Alburnett the following year to bring the current conference membership to 17 schools.
