= IHSAA =

IHSAA, as an abbreviation or acronym, may refer to the NFHS-accredited high school athletic associations in a number of states:

- Idaho High School Activities Association
- Indiana High School Athletic Association
- Iowa High School Athletic Association
