= Tipton High School =

Tipton High School may refer to one of several high schools in the United States:

- Tipton High School (Indiana) in Tipton, Indiana
- Tipton Community School District in Tipton, Iowa
- Tipton High School (Kansas) in Tipton, Kansas
- Tipton High School (Missouri) in Tipton, Missouri
- Tipton High School (Oklahoma) in Tipton, Oklahoma
