= George Winans =

American politician

Member of the Wisconsin State Assembly
- In office 1888–1890

Personal details
- Born: January 8, 1839 Camanche, Iowa, U.S.
- Died: January 1926 (aged 86–87) Wisconsin, U.S.
- Party: Democratic

George Winans (January 8, 1839 – January 1926) was an American politician and steamboat captain who served as a member of the Wisconsin State Assembly from 1888 to 1890.

== Background ==
Winans was born on January 8, 1839, in Camanche, Iowa. He would become a steamboat owner and captain. Winans was a member of the Assembly during the 1889 session. He was a Democrat. Winans died in January 1926, reports have differed on the exact date. He was buried in Waukesha, Wisconsin.
