= Monticello Community School District =

Public school district in Monticello, Iowa, United States

Location
- 850 East Oak Street; Monticello, Iowa 52310 United States
- Coordinates: 42.231979°N 91.187231°W

District information
- Type: Local school district
- Grades: K-12
- Superintendent: Brian Jaeger
- Schools: 4
- Budget: $15,928,000 (2020-21)
- NCES District ID: 1919650

Students and staff
- Students: 1035 (2022-23)
- Teachers: 76.06 FTE
- Staff: 101.96 FTE
- Student–teacher ratio: 13.61
- Athletic conference: River Valley Conference
- District mascot: Panthers
- Colors: Red and Black

Other information
- Website: monticello.k12.ia.us

The Monticello Community School District is a rural public school district headquartered in Monticello, Iowa. The district is mostly in Jones County, with smaller portions in Delaware County and Linn County. The district serves the city of Monticello, and the surrounding rural areas. Brian Jaeger was hired as superintendent in 2016.

== List of schools ==
The Monticello Community School District operates four schools, all in Monticello:

- Monticello High School
- Monticello Middle School
- Carpenter Elementary School
- Shannon Elementary School

== Monticello High School ==
=== Athletics ===
The Panthers compete in the River Valley Conference in the following sports:

- Baseball
- Bowling
- Basketball (boys and girls)
- Cross Country (boys and girls)
  - Boys' - 4-time Class 2A State Champions (2007, 2011, 2012, 2013)
  - Girls' - 2-time Class 2A State Champions (2014, 2016)
- Football
- Golf (boys and girls)
- Soccer (boys and girls)
- Softball
- Track and Field (boys and girls)
  - Boys' - 4-time Class 2A State Champions (1998, 2007, 2013, 2014)
- Volleyball
- Wrestling

== See also ==
- List of school districts in Iowa
- List of high schools in Iowa
