= West Liberty Community School District =

Public school district in West Liberty, Iowa, United States

Coordinates: 41.579282°N 91.267346°W

Location
- West Liberty, Iowa Muscatine, Cedar and Johnson counties United States
- Coordinates: 41.579282, -91.267346

District information
- Type: Local school district
- Grades: K-12
- Superintendent: Mr. Shaun Kruger
- Schools: 4
- Budget: $18,896,000 (2020-21)
- NCES District ID: 1930990

Students and staff
- Students: 1284 (2022-23)
- Teachers: 97.19 FTE
- Staff: 102.64FTE
- Student–teacher ratio: 13.21
- Athletic conference: River Valley Conference
- District mascot: Comets
- Colors: Blue and White

Other information
- Website: www.wl.k12.ia.us

The West Liberty Community School District is a rural public school district headquartered in West Liberty, Iowa.

The district is mostly in Muscatine County, with smaller portions in Cedar County and Johnson County. The district serves the city of West Liberty, and the surrounding rural areas, including the towns of Atalissa and Nichols.

Mr. Shaun Kruger was hired as superintendent in 2021.

== List of schools ==
The West Liberty school district operates four schools, all in West Liberty:

- Early Learning Center
- West Liberty Elementary
- West Liberty Middle School
- West Liberty High School

== West Liberty High School ==
=== Athletics ===
The Comets compete in the River Valley Conference in the following sports:

- Baseball
- Bowling
- Basketball (boys and girls)
- Cross Country (boys and girls)
- Football
- Golf (boys and girls)
  - Coed State Champions - 1991
- Soccer (boys and girls)
- Softball
- Swimming (boys and girls)
- Tennis (boys and girls)
- Track and Field (boys and girls)
- Volleyball
- Wrestling

== See also ==
- List of school districts in Iowa
- List of high schools in Iowa
