= West Branch Community School District =

Public school district in West Branch, Iowa, United States

Coordinates: 41.673720°N 91.349166°W

Location
- West Branch, Iowa Cedar County and Johnson County United States
- Coordinates: 41.673720, -91.349166

District information
- Type: Local school district
- Grades: K–12
- Superintendent: Marty Jimmerson
- Schools: 3
- Budget: $13,253,000 (2020-21)
- NCES District ID: 1930750

Students and staff
- Students: 871 (2022-23)
- Teachers: 60.99 FTE
- Staff: 85.93 FTE
- Student–teacher ratio: 14.28
- Athletic conference: River Valley Conference
- District mascot: Bears
- Colors: Red, Black, and White

Other information
- Website: www.west-branch.k12.ia.us

The West Branch Community School District is a rural public school district headquartered in West Branch, Iowa.

It spans across western Cedar County and eastern Johnson County, and serves the city of West Branch, and the surrounding rural areas. The district includes the Downey census-designated place.

Marty Jimmerson has been the superintendent since 2018, after leaving AGWSR Schools.

== List of schools ==
The West Branch school district operates three schools, all in West Branch:

- Hoover Elementary
- West Branch Middle School
- West Branch High School

== West Branch High School ==
=== Athletics ===
The Bears compete in the River Valley Conference in the following sports:

- Baseball
- Bowling (partnered with Iowa City High)
- Basketball (boys and girls)
- Cross Country (boys and girls)(partnered with Iowa City High)
- Football
  - 3-time Class 1A State Champions (1989, 1991, 1992)
- Golf (boys and girls)
  - Boys' - 6-time State Champions (1974, 1989, 1990, 1991, 1992, 2021)
- Soccer (boys and girls)
- Softball
- Swimming (boys and girls) (partnered with Iowa City High)
- Tennis (boys and girls)
- Track and Field (boys and girls)
  - Boys' - 2-time Class 2A State Champions (1983, 1984)
- Volleyball
- Wrestling

== Notable alumni ==
- Marv Cook- former football player for the Iowa Hawkeyes football team and National Football League.

== See also ==
- List of school districts in Iowa
- List of high schools in Iowa
