= Wilton Community School District =

Public school district in Wilton, Iowa, United States

Coordinates: 41.595858°N 91.010782°W

Location
- Wilton, Iowa Muscatine and Cedar counties United States
- Coordinates: 41.595858, -91.010782

District information
- Type: Local school district
- Grades: K-12
- Superintendent: Joe Burnett
- Schools: 2
- Budget: $14,287,000 (2020-21)
- NCES District ID: 1931800

Students and staff
- Students: 983 (2022-23)
- Teachers: 65.22 FTE
- Staff: 62.73 FTE
- Student–teacher ratio: 15.07
- Athletic conference: River Valley Conference
- District mascot: Beavers
- Colors: Blue and Gold

Other information
- Website: www.wiltoncsd.org

The Wilton Community School District is a rural public school district headquartered in Wilton, Iowa.

The district is split between Muscatine County and Cedar County. The district serves the city of Wilton, and the surrounding rural areas.

== List of schools ==
The Wilton school district operates two schools, both located in Wilton:

- Wilton Elementary School
- Wilton Jr-Sr High School

== Wilton Jr-Sr High School ==
=== Athletics ===
The Beavers compete in the River Valley Conference in the following sports:

- Baseball
  - 2-time Class 2A State Champions (1993, 2005)
- Basketball (boys and girls)
- Cross Country (boys and girls)
- Football
- Softball
- Track and Field (boys and girls)
- Volleyball
- Wrestling
  - 2-time Class 1A State Champions (1997, 2002)

== See also ==
- List of school districts in Iowa
- List of high schools in Iowa
