= Camanche Community School District =

Public school district in Camanche, Iowa, United States

Coordinates: 41.784989°N 90.258408°W

Location
- Camanche, Iowa Clinton County United States
- Coordinates: 41.784989, -90.258408

District information
- Type: Local school district
- Grades: K-12
- Superintendent: Thomas Parker
- Schools: 3
- Budget: $13,510,000 (2020-21)
- NCES District ID: 1906060

Students and staff
- Students: 995 (2022-23)
- Teachers: 76.35 FTE
- Staff: 72.15 FTE
- Student–teacher ratio: 13.03
- Athletic conference: River Valley Conference
- District mascot: Storm
- Colors: Red, Blue and White

Other information
- Website: www.camanche.k12.ia.us

The Camanche Community School District is a rural public school district headquartered in Camanche, Iowa.

The district is completely within Clinton County, and serves the city of Camanche and the surrounding rural areas.

Thomas Parker, a native of Camanche, was hired as superintendent in 2001.

== List of schools ==
The Camanche Community School District operates three schools, all in Camanche:

- Camanche Elementary
- Camanche Middle School
- Camanche High School

== Camanche High School ==
=== Athletics ===
The Storm compete in the River Valley Conference in the following sports:

- Baseball
  - 1987 Class 3A State Champions
- Bowling
  - Boys' 2-time Class 1A State Champions (2015, 2020)
- Basketball (boys and girls)
- Cross Country (boys and girls)
- Football
- Golf (boys and girls)
- Soccer (boys and girls)
- Softball
- Tennis (boys and girls)
  - Boys' - 9-time Class 1A State Champions (1983, 1984, 1985, 1986, 1988, 1989, 1990, 1992, 1995)
  - Girls' - 4-time Class 1A State Champions (1997, 2009, 2010, 2012)
- Track and Field (boys and girls)
  - Girls' - 2-time Class 2A State Champions (1986, 1987)
- Volleyball
- Wrestling

== See also ==
- List of school districts in Iowa
- List of high schools in Iowa
