= Tipton Community School District =

Public school district in Tipton, Iowa, United States

Location
- Tipton, Cedar County, Iowa, USA

District information
- Type: Public school district
- Established: 1856
- Superintendent: Brandon Borseth
- Schools: 3
- Budget: $13,746,000 (2020-21)
- NCES District ID: 11927870

Students and staff
- Students: 941 (2022-23)
- Teachers: 68.75 FTE
- Staff: 86.07 FTE
- Student–teacher ratio: 13.69
- Athletic conference: River Valley Conference (Iowa)
- District mascot: Tigers
- Colors: Black and Gold

Other information
- 9-12 Principal: Chad Rezac
- PK-4 Principal: Bryan Woods
- Website: http://www.tipton.k12.ia.us

The Tipton Community School District is a rural public school district located in Tipton, Iowa. It serves 834 students and comprises one elementary school (K-5), one middle school (6-8), and one high school(9-12). Its stated focus is on developing the total student in a full range of academic and extra curricular offerings. The school has a staff of over fifty teachers. Tipton's educational program is anchored by the basics and music, art, and physical education which are all considered essential at every educational level. K-12 special education and Talented and Gifted programs are also available. Media centers and computer labs exist in each attendance center to assist in curriculum delivery. All classrooms are computer and telephone networked with every other school within the district.

The district includes Tipton and the Rochester census-designated place.

== History ==
In 1856, Tipton established the first free public school, including a high school, west of the Mississippi River. In 1920, eighteen rural schools surrounding Tipton joined to form a consolidated school district covering over 137 square miles (350 km^{2}). In the late 1969s, population growth dictated that a new Tipton School be constructed as a three-story school near the center of the city of Tipton. The school board oversaw six country schoolhouses and by 1925 all country school students had moved into the new building in Tipton. The Tipton School was also among the first to build a gymnasium, swimming pool and auditorium for the use of elementary grades and both junior and senior high school. John Kerry visited Tipton in 2004 and spoke in the Tipton Middle School gymnasium

== Schools ==
=== Tipton High School ===
==== Athletics ====
Since 2014, the Tigers compete in the River Valley Conference, after the renaming of the Cedar Valley Conference. The Tigers compete in the following sports:

- Baseball
- Basketball (boys and girls)
- Bowling (boys and girls)
- Cross Country (boys and girls)
  - Boys' - 4-time State Champions (1975 (Class B), 2018, 2019 and 2021 (Class 2A))
  - Girls' - 7-time State Champions (1989, 1994, 2001, 2003, 2004, 2005, 2006)
- Football
- Golf (boys and girls)
- Soccer (boys and girls)
- Softball
- Swimming (boys and girls)
- Tennis (boys and girls)
- Track and Field (boys and girls)
  - Boys' - 3-time Class 3A State Champions (1983, 1984, 1985)
  - Girls' - 7-time Class 2A State Champions (1988, 1989, 1991, 2004, 2005, 2006, 2007)
  - Tipton's Ashley Miller (2007 graduate) set the state record by winning 15 of 15 Class 2A state track finals. Because of a state rule at the time, she could only run three events as a freshman.
  - 2024 2A Distance Medley All-Time Record and State Champs with a time of 4:06.37 (Addie Nerem, Alivia Edens, Ella Hein, and Noelle Steines). It was the seventh-fastest time run at state that meet in all classes.
- Volleyball
- Wrestling

==== Fine arts ====
One of the most well-known fine arts programs of THS is the Tipton Concert Choir. They have performed in Washington D.C, Wisconsin, Louisiana, and various locations around Iowa. The Tipton Chamber Choir received a "Best in Center" award in 2005, 2006 and 2007 at the state Solo/Ensemble contest. In the fall of 2006, the THS Chamber Choir was selected to perform for the Iowa Girls State Volleyball Tournament and in the Spring of 2007, the THS Concert Choir performed for the United Nations in New York City. In 2007, the THS Madrigal Choir also received "Best of Center" recognition at the 2A state solo/ensemble contest. Also in May 2009, the Tipton Concert Choir earned a perfect score at Large Group Contest singing Psalmo 150 and Gloria.

Tipton also offers many other fine arts activities such as band, drama and academic decathlon. The University of Iowa Hawkeye Drumline shared a performance on the THS field with the Tiger Band during a 2005 football game. The concert band also continuously earns division I ratings at the State Large Group contest.

== Contact information ==
- 400 E 6th St
- Tipton, IA 52772
- 563-886-2341
- Cedar County, Iowa

== Enrollment ==
Year	District-wide	High schools	Middle schools	Elementary schools	Other programs & adjustments
2003-2004	846	270	230	338	8
2002-2003	843	287	212	338	6
2001-2002	875	291	209	336	9
2000-2001	894	302	213	370	9

== See also ==
- List of school districts in Iowa
- List of high schools in Iowa
