= Bellevue Community School District =

Public school district in Bellevue, Iowa, United States

Address
- 1601 State St. Bellevue, Iowa Jackson County United States
- Coordinates: 42.257628°N 90.425837°W

District information
- Type: Public
- Motto: Believe in the Blue
- Grades: PK-12
- Established: 1861
- Superintendent: Mike Hilmer
- Schools: 2
- Budget: $9,752,000 (2020-21)
- NCES District ID: 1904650

Students and staff
- Students: 805 (2022-2023)
- Teachers: 50.78 FTE
- Staff: 44.89 FTE
- Student–teacher ratio: 15.85 FTE
- Athletic conference: River Valley Conference
- District mascot: Comets
- Colors: Blue and white

Other information
- Website: http://www.bellevue.k12.ia.us/

The Bellevue Community School District (also known as Bellevue Community Schools, or BCSD) is a rural public school district and serves the city and surrounding area of Bellevue, Iowa. It is second largest public school district in Jackson County, Iowa. It operates two buildings serving grades PK-12 and 3-4 year old preschool. Bellevue High School holds both the junior high and high school as well as an athletics complex on its campus, while Bellevue Elementary School is located downtown within the pre-Civil War Jackson County Courthouse building. The district is overseen by the Iowa Department of Education.

== Area ==
The district currently serves the city of Bellevue and most of rural northeastern Jackson County. The district also serves the cities of La Motte and Springbrook. The district has held a sharing agreement with Andrew Community School District since 2011 when Andrew's high school closed, allowing 9-12 grade students to choose between attending Bellevue High School or Maquoketa High School in Maquoketa. The district shares borders with Dubuque Community School District to the north, Andrew Community School District to the west, and Easton Valley Community School District to the south, with the Mississippi River and the state border with Illinois to the east.

== Administration ==
School board elections are held every year in November to fill vacant seats on the 5 member school board. The school board meets regularly at 6:30 PM Central Time on the second Monday of every month. These meetings are held at Bellevue High School's District Boardroom, located at 1601 State Street in Bellevue. In addition, the School Board holds special meetings and work sessions throughout the year as needed. These meetings are open to the public unless otherwise noted and agendas/minutes are available on the district's website.

== List of schools ==
- Bellevue Elementary School

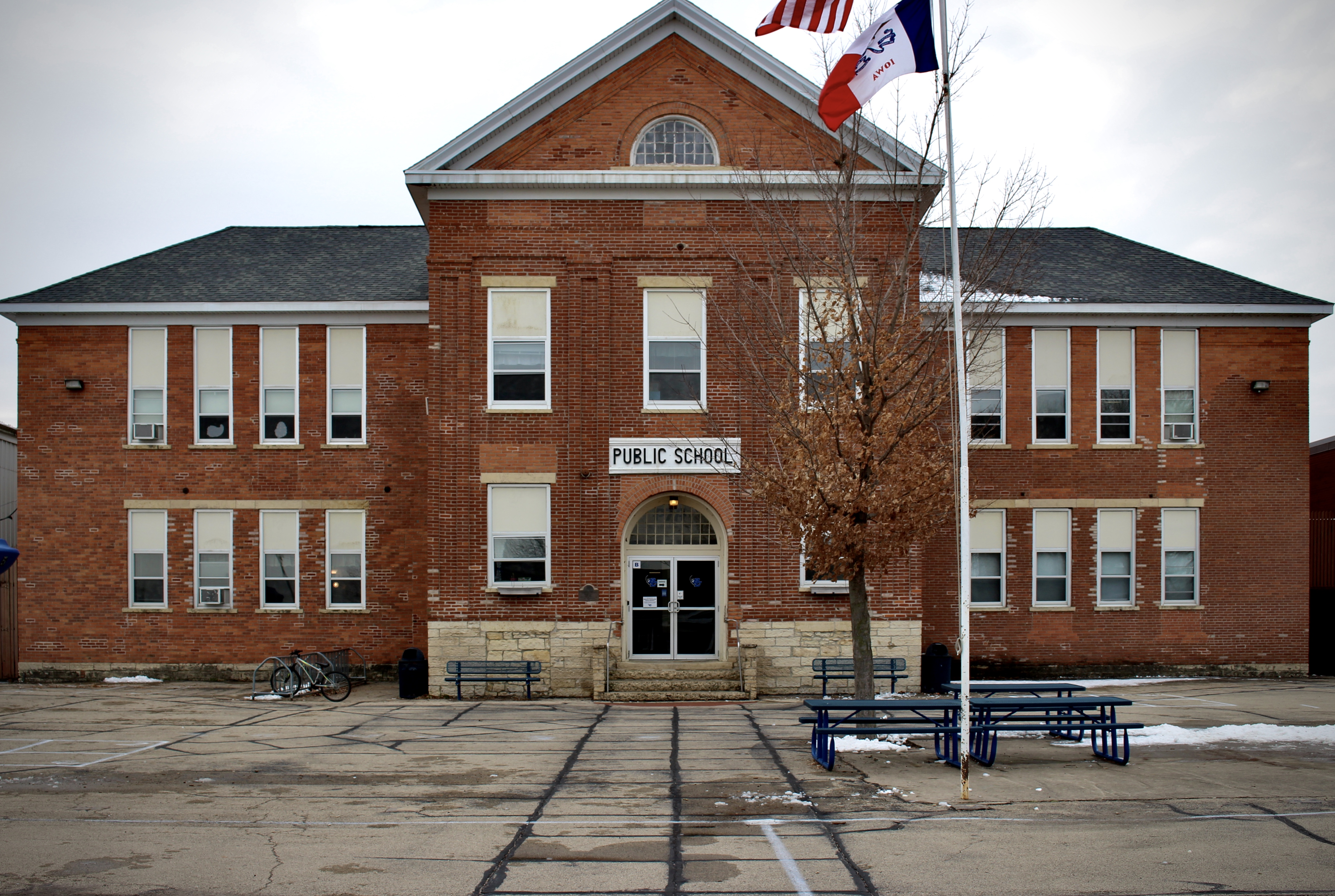
Bellevue Elementary School, formerly the Jackson County Courthouse, built in 1845.

- Bellevue High School

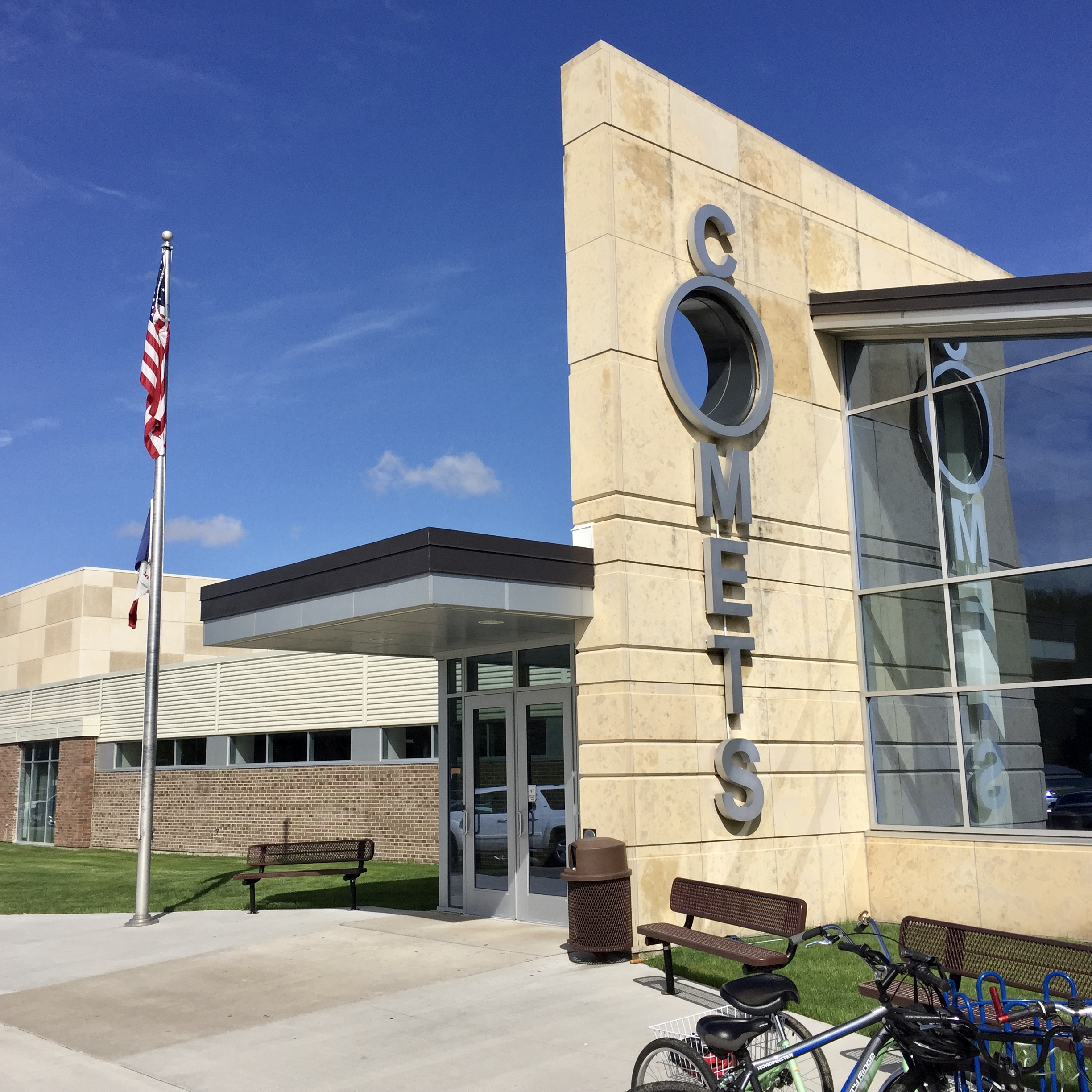
Bellevue High School

== Bellevue High School ==
=== Athletics ===
The Comets compete in the River Valley Conference in the following sports.

- Baseball
- Softball
- Bowling
- Basketball (boys and girls)
- Cheerleading
- Cross Country (boys and girls)
  - Boys' 2014 Class 1A State Champions
- Dance
- Football
- Golf (boys and girls)
- Soccer (boys and girls)
- Track and Field (boys and girls)
- Volleyball
- Wrestling

== Facts and figures ==
=== Enrollment ===
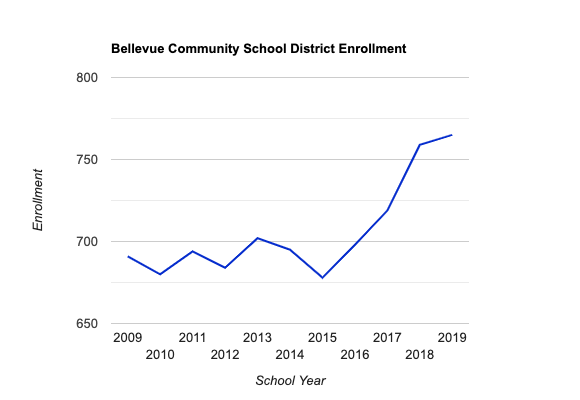
District enrollment trends

BCSD Enrollment 2009-2021Note: District wide totals include PK and TK students
| School Year | District wide | High/Middle school | Elementary School |
|---|---|---|---|
| 2009-2010 | 691 | 363 | 265 |
| 2010-2011 | 680 | 352 | 262 |
| 2011-2012 | 694 | 362 | 265 |
| 2012-2013 | 684 | 362 | 262 |
| 2013-2014 | 702 | 383 | 248 |
| 2014-2015 | 695 | 374 | 250 |
| 2015-2016 | 678 | 364 | 259 |
| 2016-2017 | 698 | 367 | 264 |
| 2017-2018 | 719 | 388 | 256 |
| 2018-2019 | 759 | 395 | 276 |
| 2019-2020 | 765 | 384 | 289 |
| 2020-2021 | 743 | 350 | 306 |
| 2021-2022 | 768 | 366 | 320 |
| 2022-2023 | 783 | 361 | 341 |

== See also ==
- Lists of school districts in the United States
- List of school districts in Iowa
- List of high schools in Iowa
