= Lisbon Community School District =

Public school district in Lisbon, Iowa, United States

Coordinates: 41.91850°N 91.388682°W

Location
- Lisbon, Iowa Linn, Cedar, Jones, and Johnson counties United States
- Coordinates: 41.918505, -91.388682

District information
- Type: Local school district
- Grades: K-12
- Superintendent: Autumn Pino
- Schools: 2
- Budget: $12,016,000 (2020-21)
- NCES District ID: 1917250

Students and staff
- Students: 719 (2022-23)
- Teachers: 51.25 FTE
- Staff: 70.10 FTE
- Student–teacher ratio: 14.03
- Athletic conference: Tri-Rivers
- District mascot: Lions
- Colors: Red and Black

Other information
- Website: www.lisbon.k12.ia.us

The Lisbon Community School District is a rural public school district headquartered in Lisbon, Iowa.

The district spans eastern Linn County, western Cedar County, with smaller areas in Jones and Johnson counties. It serves the city of Lisbon and the surrounding rural areas.

Autumn Pino has been the superintendent since 2022.

== Schools ==
The district operates three schools, all in one facility in Lisbon:

- Lisbon Elementary School
- Lisbon Middle School
- Lisbon High School

=== Lisbon High School ===
==== Athletics ====
The Lions participate in the Tri-Rivers Conference in the following sports:

- Football
  - 2011 Class 1A State Champions
- Cross Country
  - Boys' 2005 Class 3A State Champions (as Mt. Vernon-Lisbon)
  - Girls' 2008 Class 3A State Champions (as Mt. Vernon-Lisbon)
- Volleyball
- Basketball
- Wrestling
  - 16-time State Champions (top 3 in Iowa) (1973, 1974, 1975, 1977, 1978, 1980, 1982, 1983, 1986, 1988, 1989, 1990, 1992, 1993 2017, 2018)
  - 5-time State Duals Champions (1987, 1988, 1991, 2017, 2022)
- Golf
- Track and Field
  - Boys' 2023 Class 1A State Champions
  - Girls' 3-time State Champions (1985, (2009, 2010 as Mt. Vernon-Lisbon))
- Soccer
- Baseball
  - 1994 Class 1A State Champions
- Softball
  - 3-time Class 1A State Champions (1994, 1995, 1996)

== See also ==
- List of school districts in Iowa
- List of high schools in Iowa
