= Camanche, Iowa =

City of Camanche
- City
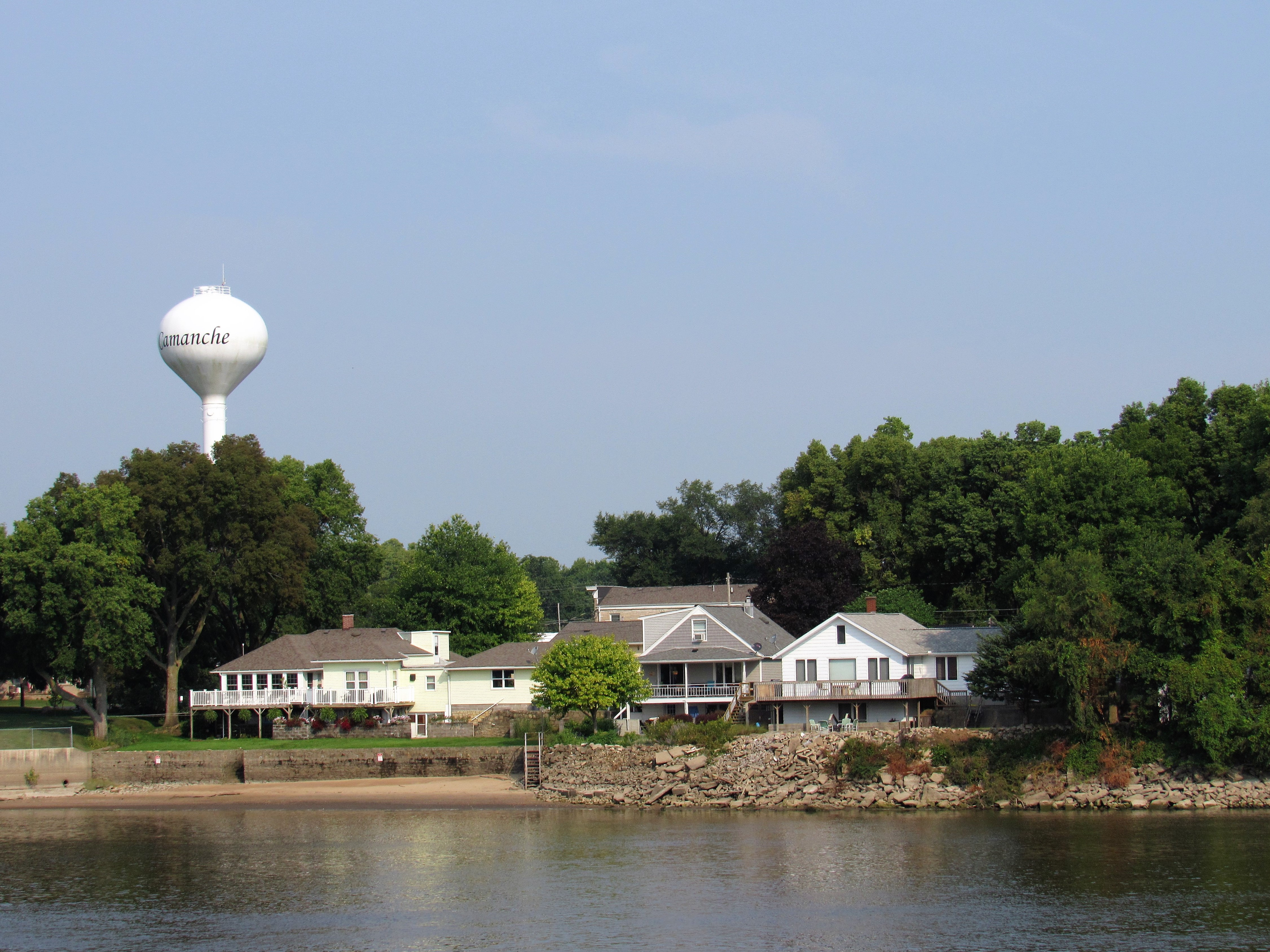
- Camanche from the Mississippi River

- Coordinates: 41°47′38″N 90°15′36″W
- Country: United States
- State: Iowa
- County: Clinton
- Founded: 1818

Area
  - Total: 9.66 sq mi (25.02 km^{2})
  - Land: 8.88 sq mi (23.00 km^{2})
  - Water: 0.78 sq mi (2.02 km^{2}) 7.95%
- Elevation: 581 ft (177 m)

Population (2020)
  - Total: 4,570
  - Density: 515/sq mi (198.7/km^{2})
- Time zone: UTC-6 (CST)
  - Summer (DST): UTC-5 (CDT)
- ZIP code: 52730
- Area code: 563
- FIPS code: 19-10135
- GNIS feature ID: 2393503
- Website: www.camancheia.org

Camanche (/kəˈmæntʃ/) is a city in Clinton County, Iowa, United States, on the Mississippi River. The population was 4,570 at the time of the 2020 census.

== History ==
A post office has been in operation in Camanche since 1837. The community was named after the Comanche Native American tribe.

=== 1860 tornado ===
On Sunday, June 3, 1860, an F4 tornado struck Camanche. Few buildings were left standing, and all structures were badly damaged. The storm moved at 50 mph. The lack of an organized way to report weather events left people living along the Mississippi River vulnerable. A raft carrying 26 men was hit outside Camanche, and only three on board survived. The tornado killed a total of 92 people, including at least 41 in Camanche. The outbreak as a whole killed more than 140 people in just a few hours and injured over 300.

== Geography ==
According to the United States Census Bureau, the city has a total area of 9.43 square miles (24.42 km^{2}), of which 8.68 square miles (22.48 km^{2}) is land and 0.75 square miles (1.94 km^{2}) is water.

== Demographics ==
Historical populations
Year	Pop.	±%
1870	840	—
1880	762	−9.3%
1890	753	−1.2%
1900	713	−5.3%
1910	629	−11.8%
1920	610	−3.0%
1930	728	+19.3%
1940	814	+11.8%
1950	1,212	+48.9%
1960	2,225	+83.6%
1970	3,470	+56.0%
1980	4,725	+36.2%
1990	4,436	−6.1%
2000	4,215	−5.0%
2010	4,448	+5.5%
2020	4,570	+2.7%
Source:"U.S. Census website". United States Census Bureau. and Iowa Data Center; Source: U.S. Decennial Census

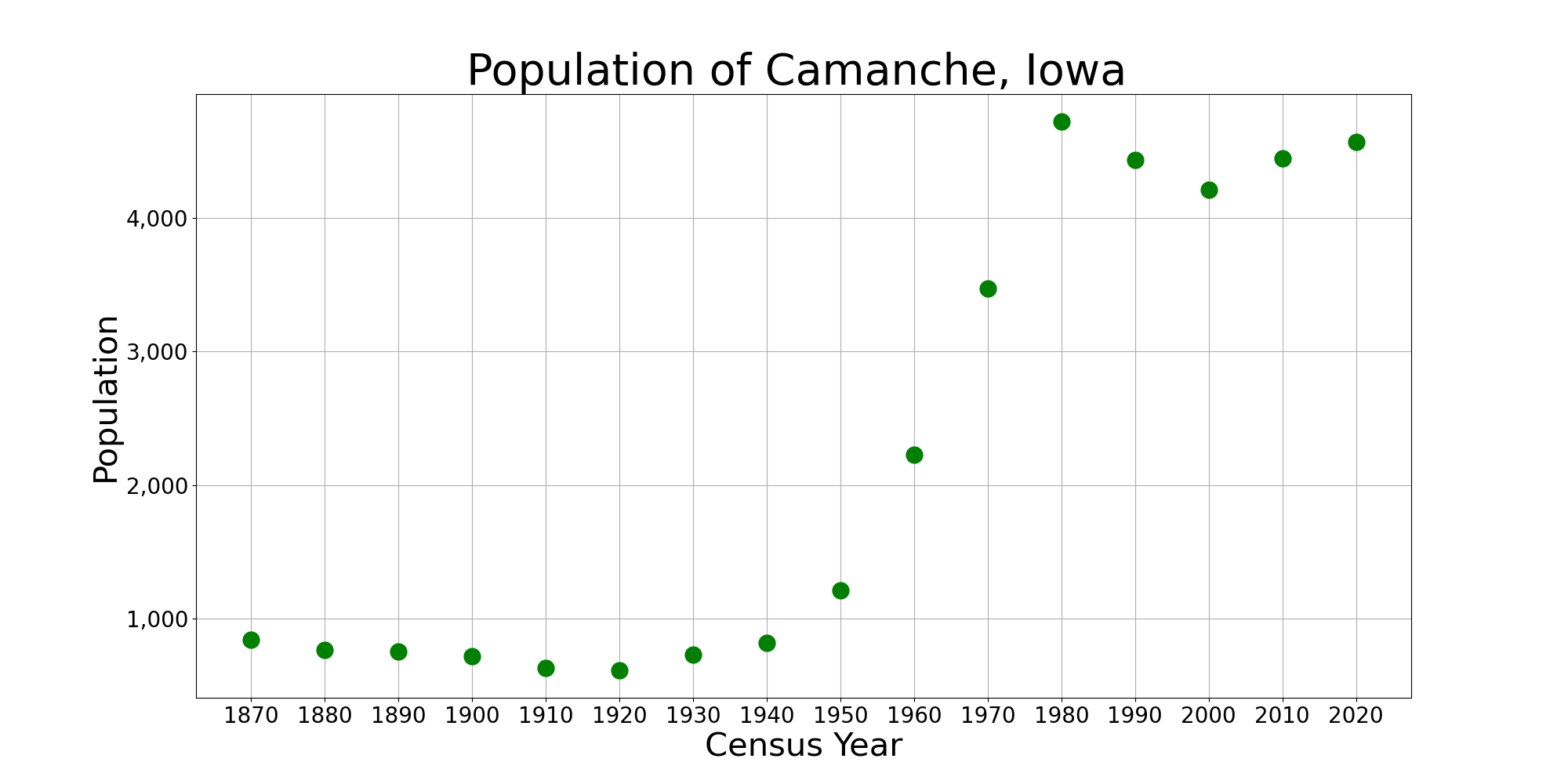
The population of Camanche, Iowa from US census data

=== 2020 census ===
As of the 2020 census, there were 4,570 people, 1,952 households, and 1,224 families residing in the city. The population density was 514.6 inhabitants per square mile (198.7/km^{2}). There were 2,076 housing units at an average density of 233.8 per square mile (90.3/km^{2}).

The median age in the city was 44.9 years. 21.5% of residents were under the age of 18 and 22.7% were 65 years of age or older. 5.0% were between the ages of 20 and 24; 21.4% were from 25 to 44; and 27.1% were from 45 to 64. The gender makeup of the city was 48.9% male and 51.1% female. For every 100 females, there were 95.9 males, and for every 100 females age 18 and over, there were 94.2 males age 18 and over.

91.2% of residents lived in urban areas, while 8.8% lived in rural areas.

Of the 1,952 households, 26.1% had children under the age of 18 living with them. 49.3% were married-couple households, 8.4% were cohabiting-couple households, 23.5% had a female householder with no spouse or partner present, and 18.8% had a male householder with no spouse or partner present. 37.3% of all households were non-families, 31.3% of all households were made up of individuals, and 15.5% had someone living alone who was 65 years of age or older.

6.0% of housing units were vacant. The homeowner vacancy rate was 1.9% and the rental vacancy rate was 9.5%.

Racial composition as of the 2020 census
Race	Number	Percent
White	4,269	93.4%
Black or African American	32	0.7%
American Indian and Alaska Native	13	0.3%
Asian	18	0.4%
Native Hawaiian and Other Pacific Islander	1	0.0%
Some other race	32	0.7%
Two or more races	205	4.5%
Hispanic or Latino (of any race)	108	2.4%

=== 2010 census ===
As of the census of 2010, there were 4,448 people, 1,918 households, and 1,249 families residing in the city. The population density was 512.4 inhabitants per square mile (197.8/km^{2}). There were 2,010 housing units at an average density of 231.6 per square mile (89.4/km^{2}). The racial makeup of the city was 97.6% White, 0.6% African American, 0.2% Native American, 0.4% Asian, 0.3% from other races, and 0.8% from two or more races. Hispanic or Latino of any race were 2.1% of the population.

There were 1,918 households, of which 28.5% had children under the age of 18 living with them, 52.9% were married couples living together, 8.3% had a female householder with no husband present, 4.0% had a male householder with no wife present, and 34.9% were non-families. 29.9% of all households were made up of individuals, and 12.7% had someone living alone who was 65 years of age or older. The average household size was 2.32 and the average family size was 2.86.

The median age in the city was 43.7 years. 22.6% of residents were under the age of 18; 6.4% were between the ages of 18 and 24; 22.9% were from 25 to 44; 30.6% were from 45 to 64; and 17.6% were 65 years of age or older. The gender makeup of the city was 49.4% male and 50.6% female.

=== 2000 census ===
As of the census of 2000, there were 4,215 people, 1,781 households, and 1,241 families residing in the city. The population density was 483.1 inhabitants per square mile (186.5/km^{2}). There were 1,870 housing units at an average density of 214.3 per square mile (82.7/km^{2}). The racial makeup of the city was 97.96% White, 0.55% African American, 0.21% Native American, 0.21% Asian, 0.02% Pacific Islander, 0.21% from other races, and 0.83% from two or more races. Hispanic or Latino of any race were 0.69% of the population.

There were 1,781 households, out of which 28.7% had children under the age of 18 living with them, 57.6% were married couples living together, 9.3% had a female householder with no husband present, and 30.3% were non-families. 26.4% of all households were made up of individuals, and 10.1% had someone living alone who was 65 years of age or older. The average household size was 2.37 and the average family size was 2.85.

22.9% are under the age of 18, 7.9% from 18 to 24, 26.5% from 25 to 44, 28.7% from 45 to 64, and 14.0% who were 65 years of age or older. The median age was 40 years. For every 100 females, there were 97.1 males. For every 100 females age 18 and over, there were 93.5 males.

The median income for a household in the city was $49,575, and the median income for a family was $58,583. Males had a median income of $42,324 versus $22,904 for females. The per capita income for the city was $23,456. About 4.3% of families and 5.2% of the population were below the poverty line, including 3.0% of those under age 18 and 6.3% of those age 65 or over.

== Education ==
Camanche High School is located in Camanche, along with Camanche Middle School and Camanche Elementary School. They are all under the Camanche Community School District

== Notable people ==
- Terry Bradshaw, four-time Super Bowl champion (lived in the town as a child)
- Tom Determann, member of the Iowa House of Representatives
- George Winans, member of the Wisconsin State Assembly
