= List of schools in the Roman Catholic Archdiocese of Dubuque =

This is a list of schools of the Roman Catholic Archdiocese of Dubuque.

== High schools ==
School	Location	Mascot
Beckman Catholic High School	Dyersville	Trail Blazers
Columbus High School	Waterloo	Sailors
Don Bosco High School	Gilbertville	Dons
Marquette High School	Bellevue	Mohawks
Newman Catholic High School	Mason City	Knights
Wahlert Catholic High School	Dubuque	Golden Eagles
Xavier High School	Cedar Rapids	Saints

=== Former high schools ===
School	Location	Mascot	Fate
Aquin Catholic	Cascade	Tomahawks	Absorbed by Beckman Catholic, Dyersville in 1976
Assumption	Cresco	Crusaders	Succeeded by Notre Dame, Cresco in 1950
DeSales	Ossian	Falcons	Closed in 1969
Holy Family/Holy Name	Mason City	Maroons	Consolidated with St. Joseph's, Mason City to form Newman Catholic, Mason City in 1960
Holy Rosary	La Motte	Unknown	Absorbed by Marquette, Bellevue in 1965
Immaculate Conception Academy	Elma	Knights/Saints	Absorbed by Notre Dame, Cresco in 1968
Immaculate Conception	Cedar Rapids	Greyhounds	Merged with St. Wenceslaus, Cedar Rapids and St. Patrick's, Fairfax tor form Regis, Cedar Rapids in 1958
Immaculate Conception	Charles City	Wildcats	Closed in 1968
Immaculate Conception	Fairbank	Rockets	Closed in 1965
LaSalle	Cedar Rapids	Lancers	Merged with Regis, Cedar Rapids to form Xavier, Cedar Rapids in 1998
Lenihan Catholic	Marshalltown	Lions	Closed in 1970
Leo Catholic	Holy Cross	Rockets	Absorbed by Wahlert Catholic, Dubuque in 1989
Loras Academy	Dubuque	Gubs	Merged with St. Clement, Bankston and St. Columbkille, Dubuque to form Wahlert Catholic, Dubuque in 1958
Marian (Visitation)	Stacyville	V-Hawks	Closed in 1968
Notre Dame	Cresco	Titans	Closed in 1989
Our Lady of Lourdes	Paris	Trojans	Consolidated with Immaculate Conception Academy, Elma in 1967
Our Lady of Victory Academy	Waterloo	Bluejays	Merged with St. Mary's, Waterloo and Sacred Heart, Waterloo to form Columbus Catholic, Waterloo in 1959
Regis	Cedar Rapids	Royals	Merged with LaSalle, Cedar Rapids to form Xavier, Cedar Rapids in 1998
Rudolphinum	Protivin	Rudohawks	Absorbed by Notre Dame, Cresco in 1968
Sacred Heart	Monticello	Eagles	Closed in 1969
Sacred Heart	Oelwein	Tigers	Closed in 1972
Sacred Heart	Waterloo	Cardinals	Merged with St. Mary's, Waterloo and Our Lady of Victory, Waterloo to form Columbus Catholic, Waterloo in 1959
St. Athanasius	Jesup	Wildcats/Angels	Consolidated with Don Bosco, Gilbertville
St. Boniface	Ionia	Unknown	Consolidated with area parishes to form St. John's, New Hampton in 1968
St. Boniface	New Vienna	Bonnies/New Hawks	Merged with Xavier, Dyersville and St. Paul's, Worthington to form Beckman Catholic, Dyersville in 1966
St. Clement	Bankston	Unknown	Merged with Loras Academy, Dubuque and St. Columbkille, Dubuque to form Wahlert Catholic, Dubuque in 1958
St. Columbkille	Dubuque	Co-Dukes	Merged with Loras Academy, Dubuque and St. Clement, Bankston to form Wahlert Catholic, Dubuque in 1958
St. George	Lansing	Knights	Closed in 1973
St. John's	Independence	Blue Eagles/Johnnies	Closed in 1989
St. Joseph's	Bellevue	Saints	Merged with area parishes to form Marquette, Bellevue in 1957
St. Joseph's	Elkader	Rams/Cagers	Closed in 1958
St. Joseph's	Farley	Johawks	Closed in 1974
St. Joseph's	Mason City	Jo-Hawks	Consolidated with Holy Family, Mason City to form Newman Catholic, Mason City in 1960
St. Luke's	Saint Lucas	Saints	Closed in 1967
St. Martin's	Cascade	Tigers	Merged with St. Mary's, Cascade and St. Patrick's, Gerryowen to form Aquin Catholic, Cascade in 1961
St. Mary of Mount Carmel	Eagle Center	Tigers	Closed in 1956
St. Mary's	Cascade	Blue Jays	Merged with St. Martin's, Cascade and St. Patrick's, Gerryowen to form Aquin Catholic, Cascade in 1961
St. Mary's	Guttenberg	Wildcats	Closed in 1968
St. Mary's	Marshalltown	Irish	Succeeded by Lenihan Catholic, Marshalltown in 1965
St. Mary's	New Haven	Unknown	Merged with Visitation, Stacyville to form Marian, Stacyville in 1965
St. Mary's	Waterloo	Cubs	Merged with Sacred Heart, Waterloo and Our Lady of Victory, Waterloo to form Columbus Catholic, Waterloo in 1959
St. Patrick's	Cedar Rapids	Shamrocks/Irish	Merged with area parishes to form LaSalle, Cedar Rapids in 1963
St. Patrick's	Dougherty	Irish	Merged with Newman Catholic, Mason City in 1964
St. Patrick's	Fairfax	Irish	Merged with St. Wenceslaus, Cedar Rapids and Immaculate Conception, Cedar Rapids to form Regis, Cedar Rapids in 1958
St. Patrick's	Garryowen	Shamrocks	Merged with St. Martin's, Cascade and St. Mary's, Cascade to form Aquin Catholic, Cascade in 1961
St. Patrick's	Ryan	Fighting Irish	Closed in 1967
St. Patrick's	Waukon	Wildcats	Closed in 1969
St. Paul's	Worthington	War Hawks	Merged with Xavier, Dyersville and St. Boniface, New Vienna to form Beckman Catholic, Dyersville in 1966
St. Wenceslaus	Cedar Rapids	Red Hawks	Merged with St. Patrick's, Fairfax and Immaculate Conception, Cedar Rapids to form Regis, Cedar Rapids in 1958
St. William's	Alta Vista	Unknown	Closed in 1967
St. Xavier	Manchester	Saints	Closed in 1952
Xavier	Dyersville	Cardinals	Merged with St. Paul's, Worthington and St. Boniface, New Vienna to form Beckman Catholic, Dyersville in 1966

== Elementary schools ==
Schools active as of April 7, 2020:

- St. Cecilia School - Ames
- St. Patrick School - Anamosa - It opened in 1944.
- Marquette Catholic School System (Bellevue Area Consolidated School) - Bellevue
- CFS Catholic School (Calmar-Festina-Spillville Consolidation) - St. Aloysius Center in Calmar and St. Wenceslaus Center in Spillville - In 2019 CFS and St. Theresa of Calcutta announced plans to consolidate into a single school, with the Calmar campus closing. Beginning fall 2020 the Ossian campus will house grades K-2 and middle school while the Spillville campus will house grades 3-4.
- Aquin Elementary School - Cascade
- St. Patrick School - Cedar Falls - A significant renovation occurred beginning in May 2014.
- All Saints School (Xavier Catholic Schools) - Cedar Rapids
- Holy Family School System (Xavier Catholic Schools) - Formerly Holy Family Consolidated School - Cedar Rapids
- St. Matthew School - Cedar Rapids
- St. Pius X School - Cedar Rapids
- Regis Middle School - Cedar Rapids
- Immaculate Conception School - Charles City
- Notre Dame Elementary School - Cresco
- St. Benedict School - Decorah - It opened in 1885 in a two story, four room frame building. The school, with five nuns as teachers, was initially until high school but in 1919 became an elementary-middle school only. The convent, which had a second-floor bridge to the original school building, was renovated to be the second school building. In 1964 the current school was built for $268,000 in southern Decorah. A new addition was established in the 1980s, with a music room, a storage and teaching aid area, and two classrooms. -
- Holy Family Catholic Schools - Dubuque - Formed in 2001 as an administrative consolidation of various area Catholic schools.
  - Nativity School - Dubuque
  - Resurrection School - Dubuque
  - St. Anthony School - Dubuque
  - St. Columbkille School - Dubuque
- St. Francis Xavier School - Dyersville
- Bosco System - Possibly: Gilbertville-Raymond Consolidation (Immaculate Conception Center in Gilbertville and (formerly?) St. Joseph Center in Raymond)
- St. Mary School a.k.a. Guttenberg-North Buena Vista Consolidation (St. Mary School) - Guttenberg
- LaSalle Catholic - Holy Cross -- Possibly new version of RCHL Catholic School (Holy Cross Center in Holy Cross and Holy Trinity Center in Luxemburg)
- St. John School - Independence
- St. Athanasius School - Jesup
- St. Mary School - Manchester
- St. Francis Catholic School, formerly Marshalltown Area Catholic School - Marshalltown
- Newman Catholic System - Mason City
- Sacred Heart School - Maquoketa
- St. Joseph School - Marion
- Sacred Heart School - Monticello
- St. Joseph Community School - New Hampton - On August 15, 1904 the school building and convent, which had a cost of $15,000, were dedicated. A fire destroyed the building in November 1921; the cause was never uncovered. Construction on a new school began in spring 1922, with the cornerstone laid on May 1. C. O. Emery Construction company made the $56,731.67 two story brick structure, which included a multipurpose room that housed a stage, auditorium, and/or gymnasium.
- Sacred Heart School - Oelwein - The school was established in 1904 in its own building. By 2019 it sustained a decline in income and in the number of students and established a GoFundMe to stave off closure. As of 2020 it has about 165 students.
- St. Teresa of Calcutta (formerly? St. Francis de Sales School) - Ossian - In 2019 CFS and St. Theresa of Calcutta announced plans to consolidate into a single school, with the Calmar campus closing. Beginning fall 2020 the Ossian campus will house grades K-2 and middle school while the Spillville campus will house grades 3-4.
- Seton Catholic School - Peosta -- Possibly new version of: Seton Catholic Elementary Consolidation (St. Patrick Center in Epworth, St. Joseph Center in Farley, and St. John Center in Peosta)
- Trinity Catholic School - Protivin
- Cedar Valley Catholic Schools - Waterloo - Could be a consolidation of:
  - Blessed Sacrament School - Waterloo - The school occupied the first floor of a joint church-school building which had the cornerstone laid on September 17, 1950. In 1951 12 classrooms were added, and in 1961 additional space was built. Capacity increased accordingly to more than 300 and then 570, respectively. The convent was connected to the main building by the second addition.
  - Sacred Heart School - Waterloo - In August 1909 the school opened, and in 1931 it received a convent, gymnasium, and another expansion.
  - St. Edward School - Waterloo
- St. Thomas Aquinas School - Webster City
- St. Patrick School - Waukon

== Former schools ==
List from year 2000:

- Sherrill-Balltown Consolidation (St. Francis Center in Balltown and S. Peter and Paul Center in Sherrill)
- Former Holy Family campuses - Dubuque
  - Holy Trinity-Sacred Heart Consolidation - Dubuque, merged into St. Francis School in 2002.
  - Downtown Catholic School (St. Mary-St. Patrick Consolidation) - Dubuque - Established in 1982, merged into St. Francis School in 2002.
  - St. Francis School - Formed in 2002, closed in 2004.
  - In 2019 the school system considered whether to close Holy Ghost School, which had 75 students, and/or St. Anthony School, which had 79 students. The decision was to close both effective 2020.
- Sacred Heart School - Dubuque
- St. Joseph the Worker School - Dubuque
- Archbishop Hennessy Catholic School - New Vienna and Petersburg - Formed in 1987 as part of a consolidation, which had two locations: grades K-3 in New Vienna, and preschool and 4-6 in Petersburg. It served as the joint parish school for Saint Boniface Church in New Vienna and Saints Peter and Paul Church in Petersburg. Enrollment was over 100 at that time. In 2013 the school consolidated all grades into its Petersburg location. Enrollments consistently decreased prior to 2017: by 2017 the school only had 45 students. Archbishop Hennessy closed in 2018.
- Saint Boniface School - New Vienna - The parish school of Saint Boniface Church, it started operations in 1847. It consolidated into Archbishop Hennessy in New Vienna in 1987.
- St. Joseph School - Earlville
- St. John-St. Nicholas Consolidation (St. Nicholas Center in Evansdale and St. John Center in Waterloo) - It formed in 1975 with the merger of two schools. They merged into Queen of Peace School in 2003.
- St. Joseph Consolidated School - Key West
- Immaculate Conception School - North Buena Vista - It was in operation until it merged into St. Mary's Catholic School in Guttenberg in 1968.
- Sacred Heart School - Osage - It opened in 1957. By 2012 it had 44 students due to consistent decreases in the student count. The school closed in 2012.
- St. Luke's School - St. Lucas
- Visitation School - Stacyville - The school, originally serving grades K-12, occupied a main building that opened in 1923 and a gymnasium. In 1968 the high school closed, making it a K-8 school. The school closed in 2003. The main building became the site of the Stacyville Memories Museum while the Stacyville Community Center and the Kids Care Daycare Center occupied the gymnasium. In 2012 it was announced the main building was to be demolished, with the museum going to the Stacyville Library, though the gymnasium would remain.
- Queen of Peace School - Waterloo - A part of Cedar Valley Catholic Schools since 2003, it formed in 2001 by the merger of St. Mary School and St. John-St. Nicholas School. It closed in 2005.
- St. Joseph School - Waterloo - In 1872 a school building, initially for K-12, was established. The high school ended in 1959 as Columbus High School opened. The church closed in 2002.
- St. Mary School - Waterloo - Merged into Queen of Peace School in 2001.
- St. Paul School - Worthington - It started circa 1874. In 2015 it had 26 students, and closed that year.
