= List of private schools in Iowa =

The following is a list of private schools in Iowa arranged alphabetically by county name.

== A ==
- St. Patrick School (Allamakee County) (K-6)

== B ==
- Central Lutheran School (Benton County) (PK-8)
- St Athanasius School (Buchanan County) (K-8)
- Storm Lake St. Mary's School (Buena Vista County) (K-12)

=== Black Hawk County ===
- Cedar Valley Catholic Schools
  - Blessed Maria Assunta Pollota Catholic Middle School (6-8)
  - Blessed Sacrament Early Childhood Center (PK)
  - Columbus Catholic High School (9-12)
  - St. Edward Elementary School (K-5)
- Don Bosco High School (9-12)
- St. Patrick Catholic School (K-12)
- Valley Lutheran School (K-12)
- Waterloo Christian School (K-12)

=== Boone County ===
- Sacred Heart School (K-8)
- Trinity Lutheran School (PK-8)

=== Bremer County ===
- Community Lutheran School (K-8)
- St Paul's Lutheran School (PK-8)

=== Buchanan County ===
- St. John Catholic School (PK-8)

== C ==
- Kuemper Catholic School (Carroll County) (K-12)
- Scattergood Friends School, (Cedar County) (6-12)
- St. Joseph Community School (Chickasaw County) (K-8)
- St. Mary Immaculate Conception School (Clayton County) (K-8)
- Prince of Peace Catholic School (Clinton County) (PK-12)
- St. Rose Of Lima School (Crawford County) (PK-5)

=== Cerro Gordo County ===
- Newman Catholic School (K-12)
- North Iowa Christian School (Cerro Gordo County) (K-12)

=== Clay County ===
- Sacred Heart Catholic School - Spencer (K-6)
- Iowa Great Lakes Lutheran School (K-6)

== D ==
- St. Patrick's School (Dallas County) (K-8)
- St. Mary's School (Delaware County)
- Notre Dame School (Des Moines County) (K-12)

=== Dubuque County ===
- Aquin Catholic School (K-8)
- Beckman Catholic High School (9-12)
- Holy Family Catholic Schools
  - Holy Family Early Childhood Center (PK)
  - Mazzuchelli Catholic Middle School (6-8)
  - Resurrection Elementary School (PK-5)
  - St. Anthony/Our Lady of Guadalupe Spanish Immersion Program (PK-5)
  - St. Columbkille Elementary School (PK-5)
  - Wahlert High School (9-12)
- St. Francis Xavier Elementary School (PK-6)
- Seton Catholic School (PK-8)

== F ==
- Immaculate Conception School (Floyd County) (PK-6)
- St. Paul's Lutheran School (Franklin County) (K-8)

== H-I ==
- St. Thomas Aquinas School (Hamilton County) (PK-6)
- Timothy Christian School (Hardin County) (K-8)
- St. Mary Catholic School (Humboldt County) (PK-6)
- Lutheran Interparish School (Iowa County) (PK-8)

=== Howard County ===
- Notre Dame Catholic School (PK-6)
- Trinity Catholic School (K-8)

== J-K ==
- Maharishi School (Jefferson County) (K-12)

=== Jackson County ===
- Marquette Catholic School System
  - Marquette High School (9-12)
  - St Joseph's Elementary School (K-8)
- Sacred Heart School (Jackson County) (PK-6)

=== Jasper County ===
- Newton Christian School (PK-8)
- Sully Christian School (K-8)

=== Johnson County ===
- Hillcrest Academy (9-12)
- Regina Catholic Education Center (PK-12)
- Heritage Christian School (PK-8)
- Faith Academy (K-6)

=== Jones County ===
- St. Patrick School (PK-6)
- Sacred Heart Grade School (PK-4)

=== Kossuth County ===
- Bishop Garrigan Catholic Schools
  - Bishop Garrigan High School (9-12)
  - Garrigan Grade Schools (3-6, 7-8)
  - Seton Early Childhood (PK)
  - Seton Grade School (K-2)

== L ==
- Inwood Christian School (Lyon County) (K-8)

=== Lee County ===
- Holy Trinity Catholic Schools (K-12)
- Keokuk Catholic Schools/St. Vincent's School (PK-5)

=== Linn County ===
- Cedar Valley Christian School (PK-12)
- Isaac Newton Christian Academy (PK-12)
- Summit Schools (PK-8)
- Trinity Lutheran School (PK-8)
- Xavier Catholic Schools
  - All Saints Elementary School (PK-5)
  - LaSalle Catholic Elementary School (PK-4)
  - LaSalle Catholic Middle School (5-8)
  - Regis Middle School (6-8)
  - St. Joseph School (PK-8)
  - St. Matthew School (PK-5)
  - St. Pius X School (PK-5)
  - Xavier High School

== M-O ==
- Oskaloosa Christian Schools (Mahaska County) (K-8)
- St. Francis of Assisi School (Marshall County) (PK-8)
- SS. Mary & Mathias Catholic School (Muscatine County)

=== Marion County ===
- Peoria Christian School (PK-8)
- Pella Christian Grade School (K-8)
- Pella Christian High School (9-12)

=== O'Brien County ===
- Sanborn Christian School (PK-8)
- St. Patrick's School (PK-8)
- Sheldon Christian School (PK-8)
- Zion-St. John Lutheran School (PK-8)

== P ==
- Clarinda Lutheran School (Page County) (K-8)
- Emmetsburg Catholic School (Palo Alto County) (PK-8)
- Pocahontas Catholic School (Pocahontas County) (K-5)
- Central Iowa Christian School (Poweshiek County) (K-8)

=== Plymouth County ===
- Gehlen Catholic School (K-12)
- Remsen St. Mary's Schools(PK-12)

=== Polk County ===
- Ankeny Christian Academy (PK-12)
- Bergman Academy (PK-8)
- Christ The King School (PK-8)
- Des Moines Adventist School (K-8)
- Des Moines Christian School (PK-12)
- Dowling Catholic High School (9-12)
- Grand View Christian School (PK-12)
- Holy Family School (PK-8)
- Holy Trinity School (PK-8)
- Joshua Christian Academy (K-12)
- Mount Olive Lutheran School (PK-8)
- Sacred Heart School (PK-8)
- St. Anthony School (PK-8)
- St. Augustin School (PK-8)
- St. Joseph Elementary School (PK-8)
- St. Pius X School (PK-8)
- St. Theresa School (PK-8)

=== Pottawattamie County ===
- Saint Albert Catholic Schools (PK-12)
- Heartland Christian School (PK-12)

== S ==
- Shelby County Catholic School (Shelby County) (PK-5)
- St. Cecilia School (Story County) (PK-5)

=== Scott County ===
- All Saints Catholic School (PK-8)
- Assumption High School (9-12)
- John F. Kennedy Catholic School (PK-8)
- Lourdes Catholic School (PK-8)
- Quad City Montessori School (PK-6)
- Rivermont Collegiate (PK-12)
- St. Paul the Apostle Catholic School (PK-8)
- Trinity Lutheran School (PK-8)

=== Sioux County ===
- Hull Christian School (PK-8)
- Hull Protestant Reformed Christian School (K-8)
- Ireton Christian School (PK-8)
- Netherlands Reformed Christian School (PK-12)
- Orange City Christian School (PK-8)
- Rock Valley Christian School (PK-8)
- Sioux Center Christian School (PK-8)
- Spalding Catholic School (K-6)
- Trinity Christian High School (9-12)
- Unity Christian High School (9-12)
- Western Christian High School (9-12)

== U-W ==
- St. Malachy School (Union County) (PK-8)
- Seton Catholic School (Wapello County) (PK-5)
- St. James Elementary School (Washington County) (PK-5)
- Scarville Lutheran School (Winnebago County) (PK-7)

=== Webster County ===
- St. Edmond School (K-12)
- St. Paul Lutheran School (PK-8)
- Community Christian School (PK-8)

=== Winneshiek County ===
- Calmar Festina Spillville Catholic School (PK-8)
- St. Benedict Catholic School (PK-8)
- St. Teresa of Calcutta Catholic School (PK-8)

=== Woodbury County ===
- Bishop Heelan Schools
  - Bishop Heelan Catholic High School (9-12)
  - Dual Language Academy (PK-2)
  - Holy Cross School (PK-8)
  - Mater Dei School (PK-8)
  - Sacred Heart School (PK-8)
- Danbury Catholic School (PK-6)
- St. Paul's Lutheran School (PK-5)
- Siouxland Christian School (PK-12)

== See also ==
- List of school districts in Iowa
- List of high schools in Iowa
- Wikipedia:WikiProject Missing encyclopedic articles/High schools/US/Iowa
