= St. Mary Historic District =

St. Mary Historic District or St. Marys Historic District, and variations with Church and otherwise, may refer to:

- St. Marys Historic District (St. Marys, Georgia)
- St. Mary's College Historic District, St. Mary, Kentucky, listed on the National Register of Historic Places
- St. Mary Historic District (Lafayette, Indiana)
- St. Mary's Catholic Church Historic District (Dubuque, Iowa)
- St. Mary's Catholic Church Historic District (Guttenberg, Iowa)
- St. Marys City Historic District, St. Marys City, Maryland
- St. Mary's Church Complex Historic District, Monroe, Michigan
- St. Mary's of the Barrens Historic District, Perryville, Missouri, listed on the National Register of Historic Places
- St. Mary Utility Area Historic District, St. Mary, Montana
- St. Mary's Church Historic District (Wharton, New Jersey), listed on the NRHP
- St. Mary's Church Non-Contiguous Historic District, Hague, North Dakota
- St. Marys Historic District (St. Marys, Pennsylvania)

== See also ==
- St. Mary's Academy Historic District (disambiguation)
