= Hollenfelz House =

Historic house in Iowa, United States

- U.S. National Register of Historic Places
- U.S. Historic district – Contributing property
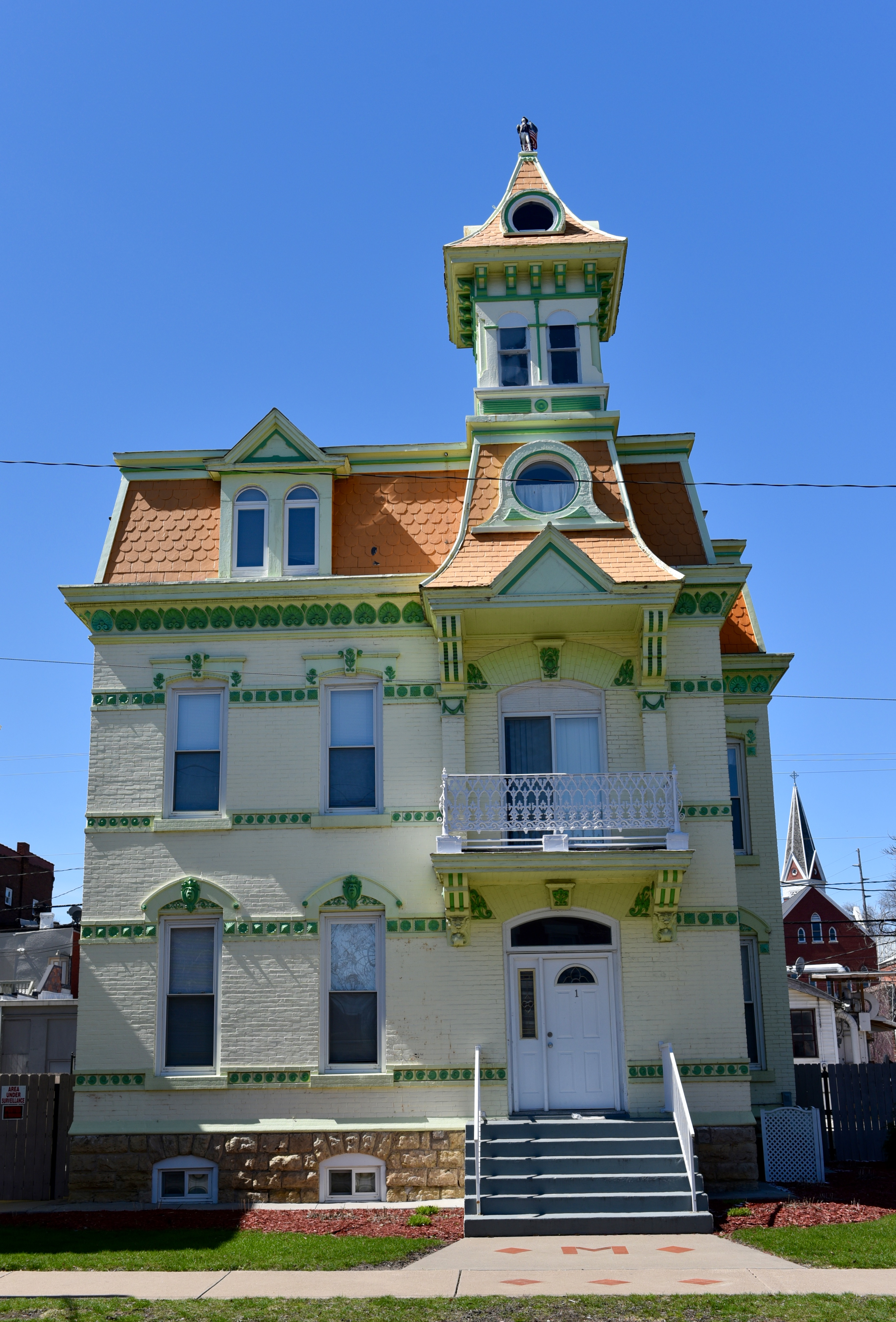

- Location within Iowa Location within the United States
- Location: 1651 White St. Dubuque, Iowa
- Coordinates: 42°30′31″N 90°40′05″W
- Area: less than one acre
- Built: 1891
- Architectural style: Second Empire
- Part of: Washington Residential Historic District (ID15000725)
- NRHP reference No.: 77000513
- Added to NRHP: September 13, 1977

The Hollenfelz House, also known as St. Mary's High School for Boys, is a historic building located in Dubuque, Iowa, United States. This highly decorative Second Empire structure was built as a home for Michael Hollenfelz, who owned a wholesale firm dealing with wines, liquors and beer. The building features a mansard roof with dormers and a cupola, which is normal for this style, and High Victorian decorative details, which is not. Particularly unusual is the cornice and the stringcourses. In 1906 it was acquired by St. Mary's Catholic Church across the street for a boy's high school. The school was operated by the Brothers of Mary from St. Louis, and its curriculum focused on business and commerce. That school ceased operations in 1929 and the building was then used for the parish grade school. In 1957 it was converted into an apartment building. It was individually listed on the National Register of Historic Places in 1977, and it was included as a contributing property in the Washington Residential Historic District in 2015.
