= Holy Trinity Catholic Church =

Holy Trinity Catholic Church may refer to:

- Holy Trinity Catholic Church (Shreveport, Louisiana)
- Holy Trinity Catholic Church (Washington, D.C.)
- Holy Trinity Catholic Church (Luxemburg, Iowa)
- Holy Trinity Catholic Church (Honolulu)
- Holy Trinity Catholic Church (Trinity, Indiana)
- Holy Trinity Catholic Church, Braamfontein
