= Bryce Ball =

American baseball player (born 1998)

- First baseman
- Born: July 8, 1998 (age 27); Mason City, Iowa, U.S.
- Bats: Left Throws: Right

Brycelin Steven Ball (born July 8, 1998) is an American former professional baseball first baseman.

== Career ==
Ball attended Newman Catholic High School in Mason City, Iowa, and played college baseball at North Iowa Area Community College and Dallas Baptist University. He was drafted by the Atlanta Braves in the 24th round of the 2019 Major League Baseball draft.

=== Atlanta Braves ===
Ball made his professional debut with the Danville Braves and was later promoted to the Rome Braves. In 62 games, he hit .329/.395/.628 with 17 home runs and 52 runs batted in (RBIs) over 231 at-bats. The Braves invited him to their Spring Training in 2020. However, he did not play a minor league game in 2020 due to the cancellation of the minor league season because of the COVID-19 pandemic. Ball began the 2021 season with Rome.

=== Chicago Cubs ===
On July 15, 2021, Ball was traded to the Chicago Cubs in exchange for Joc Pederson. He was assigned to the South Bend Cubs with whom he finished the season. Over 107 games between Rome and South Bend, he slashed .206/.351/.387 with 13 home runs, 52 RBIs, and 21 doubles.

Ball spent the 2022 season with the Double–A Tennessee Smokies. Playing in 131 games, he hit .265/.357/.405 with 11 home runs and a career–high 76 RBI.

In 2023, Ball played in 52 games split between South Bend and Tennessee, accumulating a .214/.323/.305 batting line with 1 home runs and 28 RBI. On July 4, 2023, Ball was released by the Cubs organization.

=== Cleveland Guardians ===
On July 20, 2023, Ball signed a minor league contract with the Cleveland Guardians organization. In 43 games with the Double–A Akron RubberDucks, he slashed .224/.305/.436 with eight home runs and 22 RBI.

=== Philadelphia Phillies ===
On December 6, 2023, Ball was selected by the Philadelphia Phillies in the minor league phase of the Rule 5 draft. In 54 games for the Double–A Reading Fightin Phils, he batted .193/.301/.324 with three home runs and 19 RBI. Ball was released by the Phillies organization on July 1, 2024.

== Coaching Career ==
In 2026, Ball was named as hitting coach for the Lake County Captains the High-A affiliate of the Cleveland Guardians.
