= Steeple =

Tall tower, usually on a church or public building

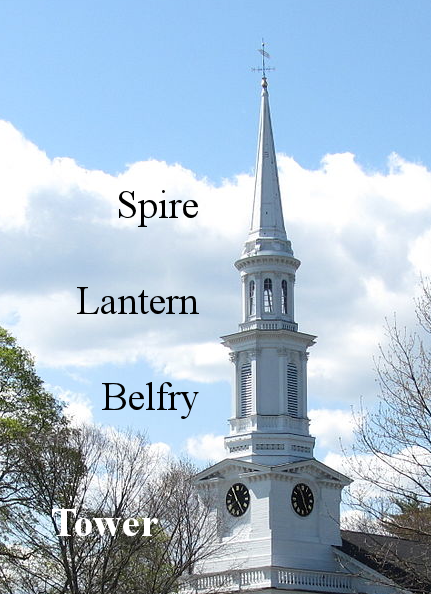
Typical steeple with components

In architecture, a steeple is a tall tower on a building, topped by a spire and often incorporating a belfry and other components. Steeples are very common on Christian churches and cathedrals and the use of the term generally connotes a religious structure. They might be stand-alone structures, or incorporated into the entrance or center of the building. In Christianity, steeples serve as a clear marker of a Christian church and are "an elaborate architectural metaphor—a symbol pointing to heaven", directing the minds of the faithful upward to God.

== Architecture ==
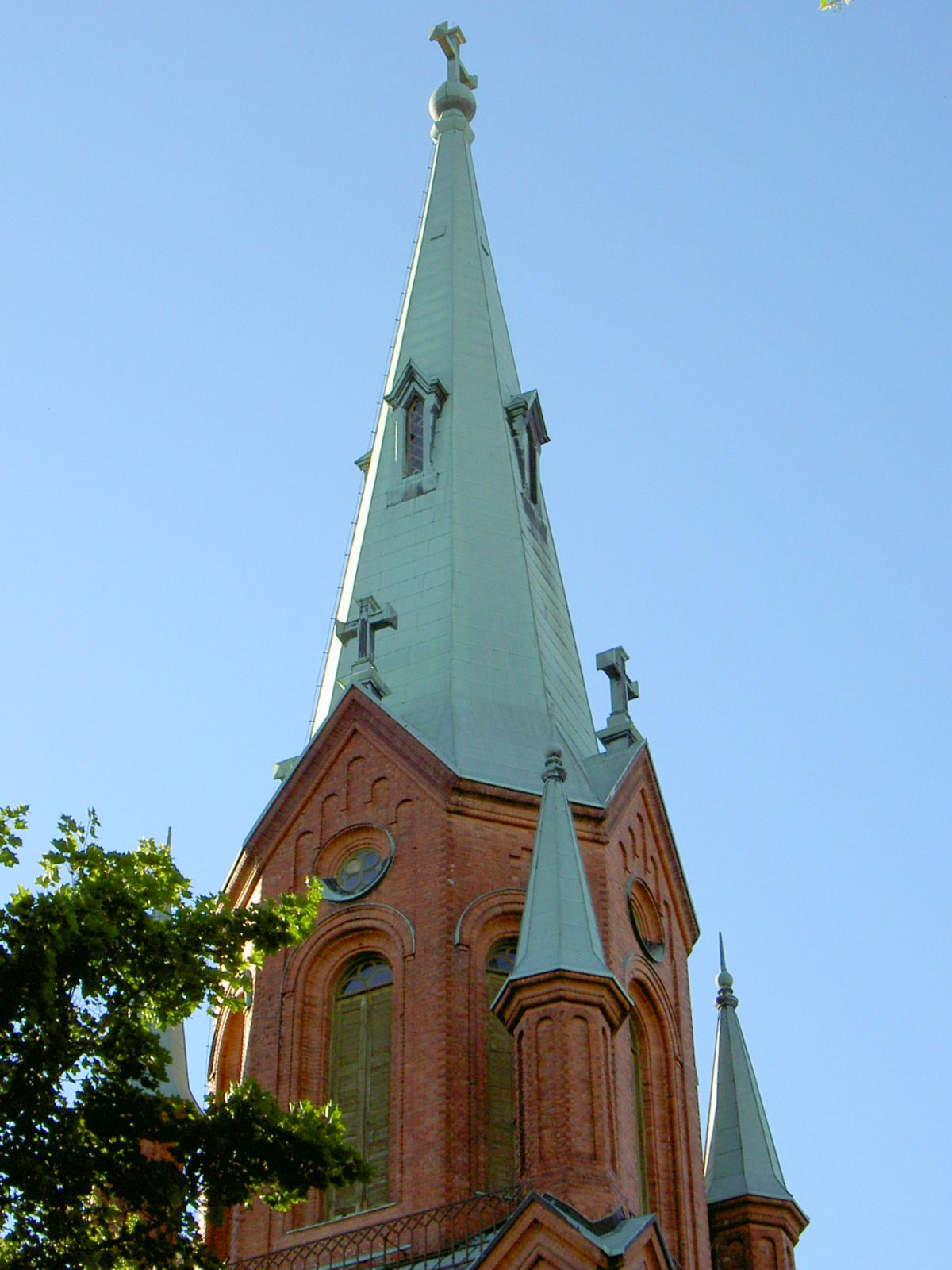
The steeple of the Alexander Church in Tampere, Finland

Towers are a common element of religious architecture worldwide and are generally viewed as attempts to reach skyward toward heavens and the divine. Towers were not a part of Christian churches until about AD 600, when bell towers first came into use. At first they were fairly modest and entirely separate structures from churches. Over time, they were incorporated into the church building and capped with ever-more-elaborate roofs until the steeple resulted.

== Threats to steeples ==
Steeples can be vulnerable to earthquakes. A number of Romanian churches feature unusually slender steeples, and over half of these have been lost to earthquakes. Because of their height, steeples can also be vulnerable to lightning, which can start fires within steeples. An example of this is Holy Trinity Catholic Church in Luxemburg, Iowa, which lost its steeple in a fire believed to have been started by a lightning strike. Steeples are also at the mercy of strong winds and hurricanes. For example, the Old North Church's steeple was toppled by a "great gale" in 1804, and again by Hurricane Carol in 1954.

== See also ==
- Bell-gable
- Bell tower
- Flèche
- Minaret
