= St. Luke's School and Recreation Center =

- U.S. National Register of Historic Places
- Location within Iowa Location within the United States
- Location: 212 East Main; St. Lucas, Iowa
- Coordinates: 43°04′0.5″N 91°55′50″W
- Area: less than one acre
- Built: 1911, 1950
- Architect: Francis X. Boeding; Francis L. Schuh
- Architectural style: Colonial Revival; Modern Movement
- NRHP reference No.: 05000899
- Added to NRHP: August 24, 2005

St. Luke's School and Recreation Center is a historic building located in St. Lucas, Iowa, United States. It was listed on the National Register of Historic Places in 2005.

== History ==
St. Luke's Catholic Church and the city of St. Lucas were both established in 1855 by people who were largely of German heritage. The school was begun at the same time as the parish. Lay people served as its first teachers until 1876 when the Franciscan Sisters of Perpetual Adoration from La Crosse, Wisconsin started teaching in the school. A large frame school building and convent were built the same year. The parish and its school were largely defined by two long-time pastorates, those of the Rev. F.X. Boeding (1882-1928) and Msgr. Francis Schuh (1928-1967). Boeding had another frame school building constructed in 1905, and it was destroyed in a fire on February 11, 1911.

Boeding is credited with designing the present Georgian Revival building that was completed later in 1911. It is possible he consulted with Dubuque contractor Anton Zwack, who is responsible for building the present St. Luke's Church across the street three years later. The 2½-story, brick structure built on a raised limestone basement. It is capped with a hip roof and features a large wall dormer with a Palladian window. Both of the upper floors have three large classrooms. St. Luke's High School was established by Msgr. Schuh in 1941. The increased enrollment necessitated a two-story addition onto the back of the building with added classroom space in 1947.

The recreation center was built onto the east side of the school building in 1950. It provided a gymnasium, bowling lanes, and a cafeteria. The cafeteria also doubled as a place for parish and community meetings. The Modern Movement structure is a single-story in height built over an exposed basement in the back. The basement is concrete while the main part of the building is clay hollow tile block. It has an entrance vestibule on the front and it is connected to the school building by means of a passageway.

Enrollment in the schools peaked in the early 1960s with 275 students. The high school remained in operation until 1967. Student's from St. John Nepomucene in neighboring Fort Atkinson joined the students at St. Luke's before the school was closed in 1997. That year the parish schools from St. Lucas, Fort Atkinson and Holy Trinity in Protivin were merged. The consolidated Trinity Catholic School utilizes the building in Protivin. The building now houses the German-American Museum and Heritage Center.
