= Washington Residential Historic District =

Historic district in Iowa, United States

- U.S. National Register of Historic Places
- U.S. Historic district
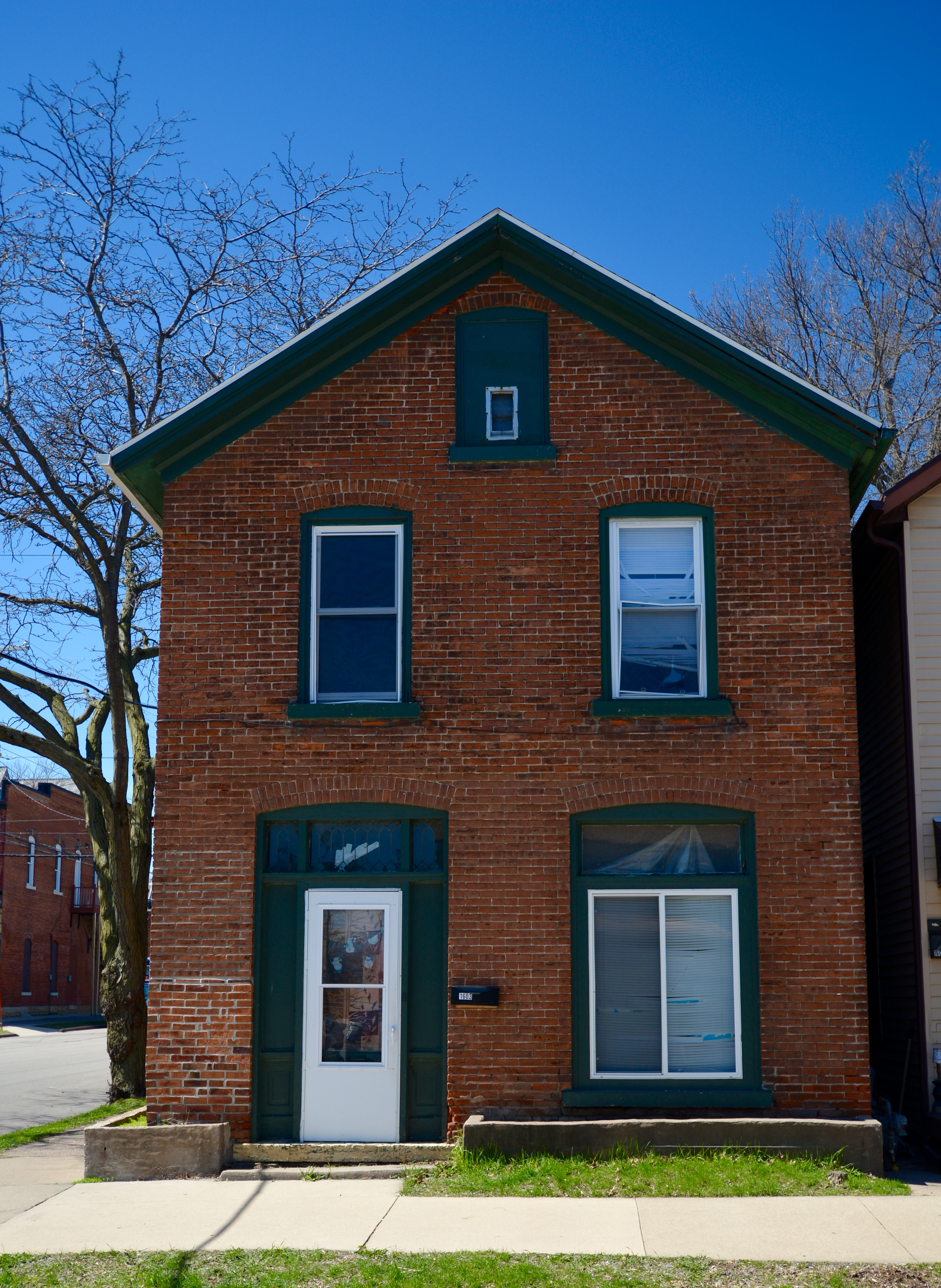
- 1603 Washington St. (pre-1872)

- Location within Iowa Location within the United States
- Location: 1100 - 1900 blocks White, Jackson & Washington Sts., Dubuque, Iowa
- Coordinates: 42°30′27.4″N 90°39′59″W
- Area: 36.3 acres (14.7 ha)
- MPS: Dubuque, Iowa MPS
- NRHP reference No.: 15000725
- Added to NRHP: October 13, 2015

Washington Residential Historic District is a nationally recognized historic district located in Dubuque, Iowa, United States. It was listed on the National Register of Historic Places in 2015. At the time of its nomination it consisted of 327 resources, which included 262 contributing buildings, 61 non-contributing buildings, and two non-contributing objects. This is one of the early residential areas of Dubuque, and was home to its German community. It also defines the "walkable city" with commercial, industrial, and institutional buildings located here. There are a number of churches in the district from various denominations. Of particular interest are St. Mary's Catholic Church (1866), St. John's Lutheran Church (1880), and St. Matthew's Lutheran Church (1908). A significant number of the buildings were constructed in brick, and the vast majority of the buildings in the district were built by 1891. Vernacular structures are commonplace here, as are various Victorian styles. Hollenfelz House (1891) and the Dubuque Casket Company building (1894) are individually listed on the National Register. The former St. Mary's Catholic Church complex forms its own historic district within this one.
