= Tim Cordes =

American physician

Tim Cordes is a blind American physician who earned a Doctor of Medicine degree from the University of Wisconsin–Madison in 2005, and is the second blind person ever to be accepted to an American school of medicine. Valedictorian of University of Notre Dame with a Bachelor of Science in biochemistry, Cordes has also earned a black belt in jiu-jitsu, and carried the Olympic Torch through Wisconsin in 2002. As an infant, he was diagnosed with Leber's hereditary optic neuropathy, which caused his blindness. Since adolescence, Cordes has been assisted by a guide dog. Cordes attended Columbus High School in Waterloo, Iowa.

Cordes created a program called TimMol to represent atoms in protein structures musically instead of graphically as is more common for biochemistry software. Different elements are represented by different musical instruments, and spatial coordinates x, y, and z are represented by varying the notes' left-right position, loudness, and pitch respectively.
