= Saint Paul's Catholic Church (Worthington, Iowa) =

Church building in Worthington, Iowa, US

Coordinates: 42.3956°N 91.1215°W

Saint Paul's Catholic Church is a parish of the Roman Catholic Church This parish is located in Worthington, Iowa, and is part of the Archdiocese of Dubuque. St. Paul's is linked with the Basilica of St. Francis Xavier in Dyersville, Iowa, with whom it shares a pastor.

== History ==
Initially, the settlers of Worthington were English, but they were soon followed by German and Irish families. At first most of the residents of Worthington traveled to St. Francis Church in Dyersville, while some went to Saint Martin's Church in Cascade, Iowa, because services there were conducted in Latin (as it was everywhere before Second Vatican Council) with homilies in English.

=== Founding of Worthington Parish ===
In 1862 Rev. Anton Kortenkamp (1834–1889) arrived in Dyersville, Iowa. He would attend to the needs of Worthington Catholics until 1875. By 1868 the population of Worthington had grown large enough that Kortenkamp had decided the time had come for a new parish to be established in Worthington. Construction of a brick building was soon begun and the new parish was dedicated to Saint Paul. The cornerstone of this first building had the inscription, "Romisch Catholische, St. Paulus Kirche, Gebaut 1 Nov. 1868." The new church took about four years to complete.

At first the new parish did not have a resident pastor. Fr. Kortenkamp would come to Worthington once a month to say Mass. At times he would bring some members of the Dyersville Choir with him so that a High Mass could be held in Worthington.

=== 1875–1952 ===
In 1875 St. Paul's received its first resident pastor, John S. Baumann. He began building a new parish school, and also established societies for parishioners. By 1878 the population had grown to the extent that it was necessary to build an extension onto the church. He also built a new rectory, which would serve the pastors until the current rectory was built in 1921. Fr. Baumann left when he was appointed a professor at Columbia College (known today as Loras College).

Baumann was followed by George W. Heer. The present church structure began construction in 1883, during Heer's tenure, and dedicated December 3, 1889. This new 54x110-foot building had a spire that stretched 140 feet (43 m) into the air. A statue of St. Paul was placed over the entryway; this statue was a gift from Baumann. The cost of erecting this building was about $12,000, with the inside unfinished. Heer also had a new 60x60-foot school with nine classrooms built near the church.

Heer was followed by James Zigrang in December 1889. During Zigrang's tenure as priest, the interior of the church was frescoed and new Stations of the Cross were placed in the church. After Zigrang returned from the Holy Land in 1907, he provided the church with a new pipe organ, which continues to serve this church today. He would serve until his death in 1913, having given the last 24 years of his life to St. Paul's parish. Fr. Zigrang was buried in the parish cemetery.

J.H. Schilmoeller was assigned as pastor of St. Paul's in August 1913. He would be another long-term priest of the parish, who served 39 years at St. Paul's. During his tenure the church was enlarged. He also directed the construction of a Sisters' Home in 1914. This particular convent was the first one in Iowa in which every nun had her own private room. This 54x44-foot building had 29 rooms.

=== Postwar years ===
In 1956, because of its great size and beauty, Pope Pius XII proclaimed St. Francis Xavier Church a Basilica (among only nine other Basilicas in the USA at that time, and still the only Basilica in a rural area).

== School ==
There was previously a parish school, St. Paul's School. It started circa 1874. In 2015 it had 26 students, and closed that year. By 2016 the Worthington city council was considering whether to buy the building so it could be converted into a factory.
