= St. Mary's Catholic Church (Guttenberg, Iowa) =

- St. Mary's Catholic Church; Historic District
- U.S. National Register of Historic Places
- U.S. Historic district
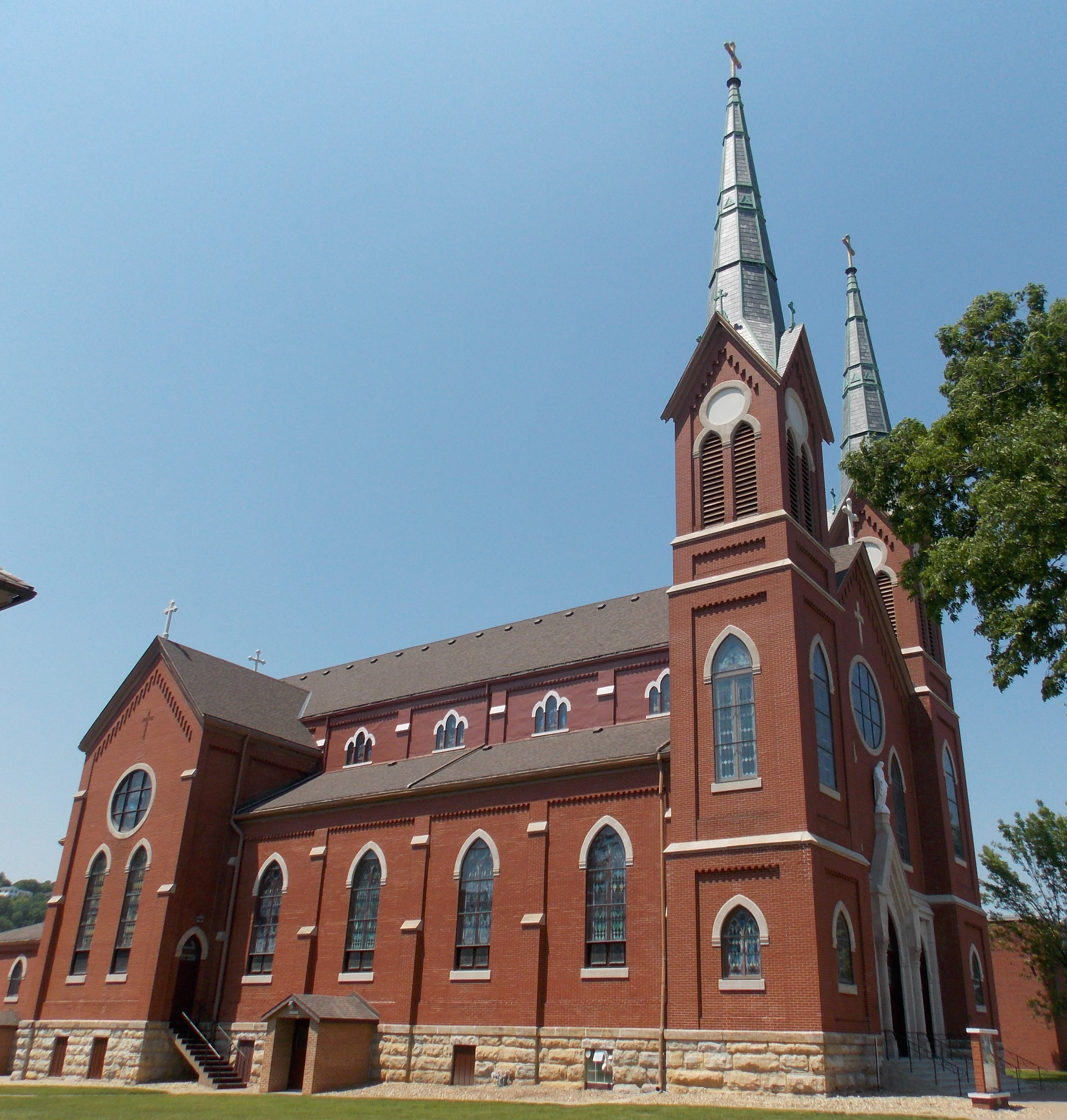

- Location within Iowa Location within the United States
- Location: 502, 518, and 520 S. 2nd St. and 214 Herder St., Guttenberg, Iowa
- Coordinates: 42°46′52.8816″N 91°5′50.604″W
- Area: less than one acre
- Built: 1894 (school); 1899 (rectory); 1904 (church); 1926 (convent)
- Architect: Rev. Joseph H. Brinkman; Carimir Ignatius Krajewski
- Architectural style: Gothic Revival; Colonial Revival; Tudor Revival
- MPS: Guttenberg MRA
- NRHP reference No.: 04000817
- Added to NRHP: August 12, 2004

St. Mary's Catholic Church is a parish of the Archdiocese of Dubuque. The church is located in Guttenberg, Iowa, United States. It is listed on the National Register of Historic Places as St. Mary's Catholic Church Historic District. In addition to the church, the historic district includes the parish rectory, convent, and school building.

== History ==
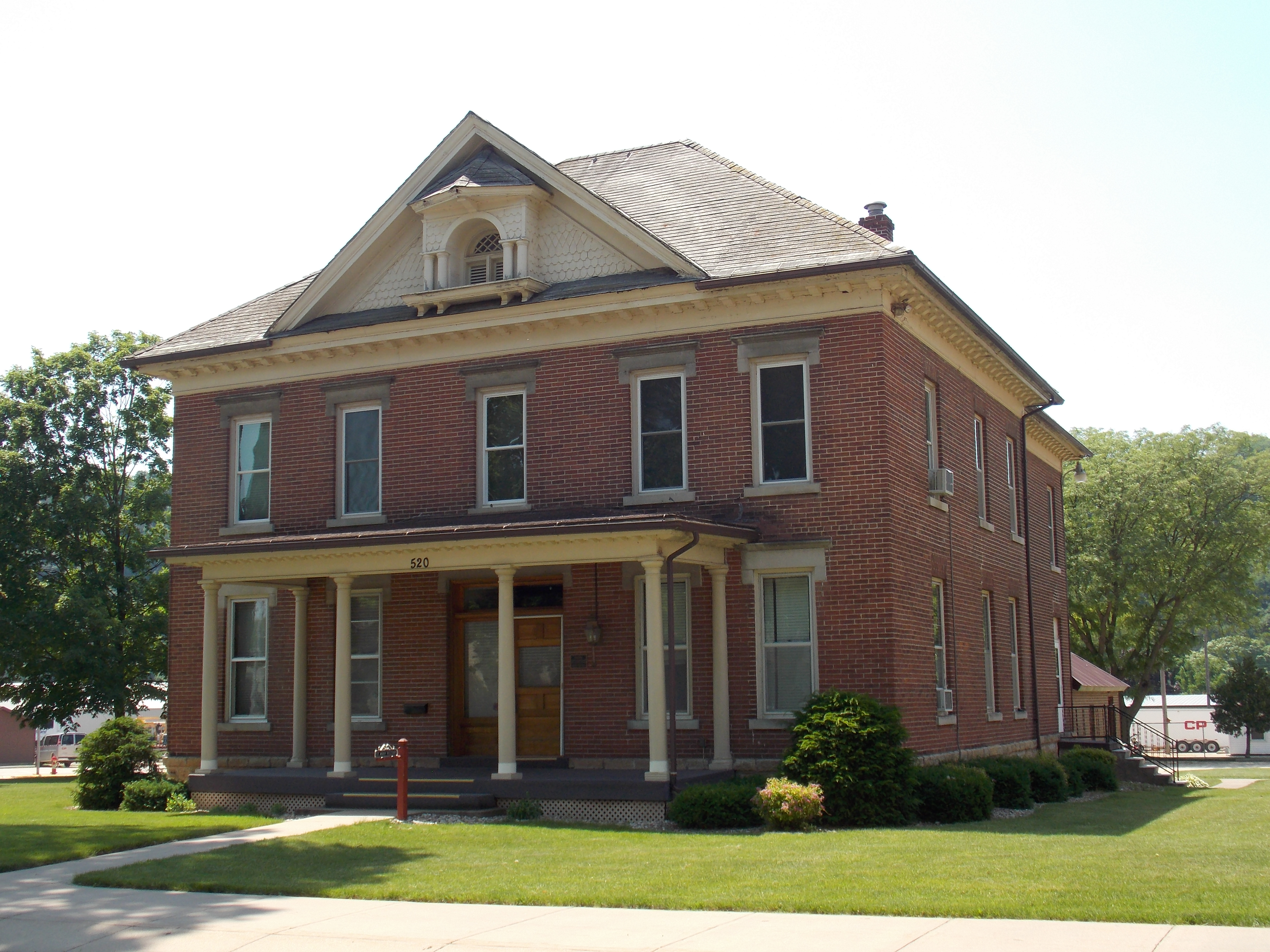
Rectory

The parish was established in 1851. The parish's first church building was a 20-by-28-foot (6.1 by 8.5 m) frame structure built in 1851 on the north side of town. A 30-by-50-foot (9.1 by 15.2 m) brick church was constructed two years later and the original frame church was converted into a school. Plans to replace it began in 1865, but disagreements about where to build it doomed the effort. Eventually, it was decided to relocate the parish property and a new stone church was completed in 1874.

The Rev. Joseph Brinkman became the pastor in 1889. He had been instrumental in the construction of the Basilica of St. Francis Xavier in Dyersville, Iowa. Brinkman designed a new school (1894), rectory (1899), and the present church (1904). Parishioners had determined that the school building was too small. The 50-by-70-foot (15 by 21 m) Colonial Revival structure was completed for $8,000, and the old school building was converted into a convent. Soon after the roof of the frame rectory started to deteriorate and it had other problems. A building committee of parishioners decided not to waste money on the old house. The new 42-by-34-foot (13 by 10 m) residence was completed for $3,500. It is a two-story, brick Colonial Revival structure with Italianate influences. The old rectory was moved to a different lot in town.

Complaints about lack of space in church went back as far as 1892. Brinkman suggested adding a side wing onto the 1874 structure, but the parishioners decided a new church was feasible. Groundbreaking took place in 1902 and the church was completed in 1904. The lack of architect fees was a huge savings to the parish in their desire to expand their parish plant. In 1921 a wing was added to the south side of the school building to house, not only increased enrollment, but an expansion to ten grades. Brinkman had planned to build a new convent to replace the aging former school building the Franciscan Sisters continued to occupy, but he died unexpectedly on October 11, 1925. His successor, the Rev. Joseph A. Dupont, set to work immediately to provide an adequate home for the Sisters. This time a trained architect, Carimir Ignatius Krajewski from Dubuque, was chosen to design the new $13,545 Tudor Revival residence that was completed in 1926. The old convent was torn down.

In 1961 a new school building, used in addition to the old school building, was built on the site of the old convent. The high school department was discontinued in 1968, and the Franciscan Sisters of Perpetual Adoration ended their 98 years of service to the parish that same year. The grade school was consolidated with Immaculate Conception School in North Buena Vista, also in 1968.

== Architecture ==
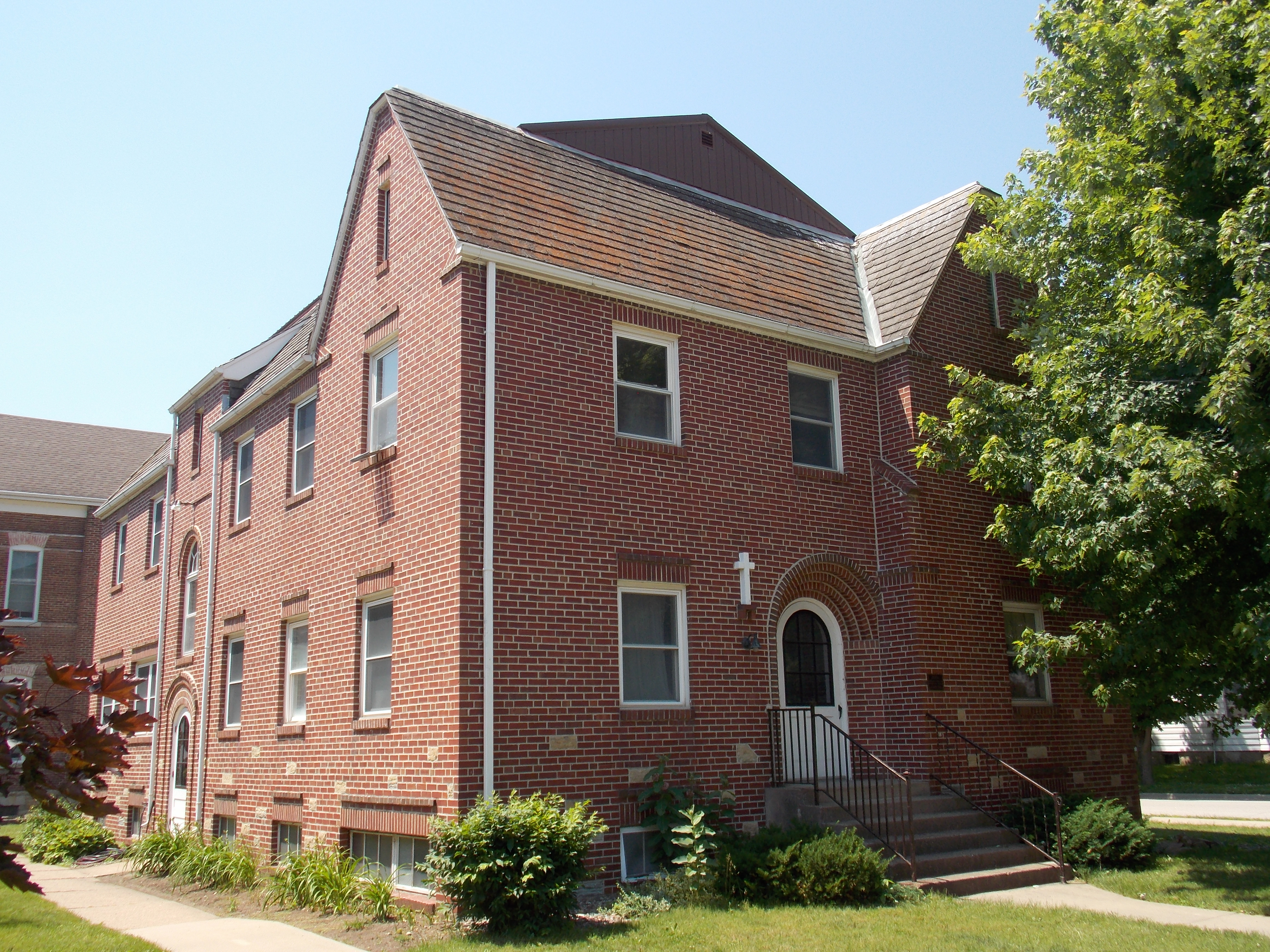
Convent

The church is a Gothic Revival, cross-shaped structure that features twin spires, which flank a tripartite entrance portal. It was originally designed to be built of sandstone. After the stone foundation was completed it was decided to build the structure with bricks that were manufactured in St. Louis, Missouri. The church's dimensions are: 152 feet (46 m) long, 62 feet (19 m) wide, and 74 feet (23 m) at the transept. The church can seat 800 people. The bell towers are 146 feet (45 m) high and rise well above any other structure in town.

== School ==
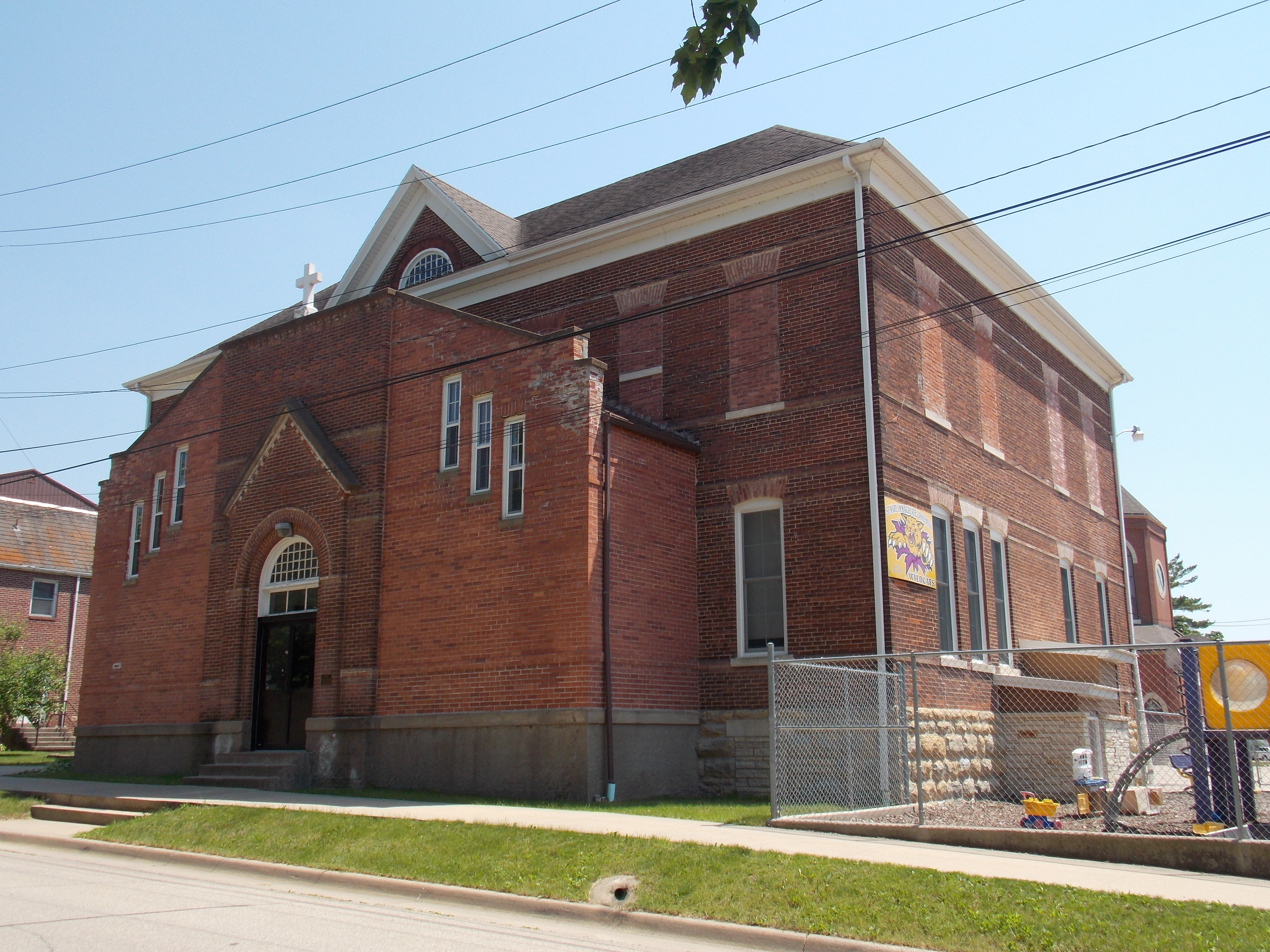
St. Mary's Catholic School building

The church hosts the St. Mary's Catholic School. The school opened in 1853, and it received a two story facility in 1860. In 1894 the current building was constructed at a cost of $5000. Initially a grade school, it received a high school section which had its building constructed in 1921 and in 1925 received accreditation. In 1968, Immaculate Conception School in North Buena Vista merged into St. Mary's and the high school closed.
