= Worthington, Iowa =

- City
- Location of Worthington, Iowa
- Coordinates: 42°24′02″N 91°07′32″W
- Country: United States
- State: Iowa
- County: Dubuque

Area
  - Total: 0.45 sq mi (1.17 km^{2})
  - Land: 0.45 sq mi (1.17 km^{2})
  - Water: 0 sq mi (0.00 km^{2})
- Elevation: 906 ft (276 m)

Population (2020)
  - Total: 382
  - Density: 844.9/sq mi (326.22/km^{2})
- Time zone: UTC-6 (Central (CST))
  - Summer (DST): UTC-5 (CDT)
- ZIP code: 52078
- Area code: 563
- FIPS code: 19-87060
- GNIS feature ID: 2397379
- Website: www.worthingtoniowa.com

Worthington is a city in Dubuque County, Iowa, United States. The population was 382 at the time of the 2020 census, up from 381 in 2000. Iowa Highway 136 passes through Worthington, which is situated north of Cascade and south of Dyersville.

== History ==
The land on which Worthington is currently located was originally purchased by David Lovelace from the United States Government. The Dubuque South-Western Railroad — the local branch of the Chicago-Milwaukee and St. Paul lines — was contracted to establish a line from Farley to Cedar Rapids, Iowa. In 1858, an Englishman named Amos Worthington came to the area to establish a general store. By November of that year, the area became an unincorporated town known as the village of Worthington. By May of the following year regular rail service was established. A plat of Worthington was established with the Dubuque county recorder in 1858.

In 1861, Worthington sold his store to a William Moore and left for Cincinnati, Ohio. Eventually this store became known as the Heffner and Lattner Store. Settlers also began arriving in the area, with a number of people setting up businesses.

Soon a Baptist church was established in Worthington, with James Hill as Pastor. In 1868 Father Kortenkamp of St. Francis parish in Dyersville decided that Worthington was large enough to merit its own Catholic parish, and St. Paul's Catholic Church was begun.

On October 1, 1892, a number of local citizens filed a petition in the District Court of Iowa in and for Dubuque County asking for Worthington to be formally incorporated as a town. On November 23, the court called for village inhabitants Peter Baum, W. Lattner, G.A. Dando, Louis Hoppleu, and Theodore Ament to act as commissioners. As commissioners they were to call for a special election of all qualified people in the proposed area to vote on the matter of being incorporated. This election was held on January 2, 1893. There were 42 votes cast — 32 were for the proposal and ten were against. On January 10, 1893, the Clerk of the District Court reported that the election was held.

The notice of the incorporation election was posted in the Dyersville Commercial for several weeks, with the last notice being published on February 17, 1893. Then on March 6, 1893, the results of the election were formally certified by the District Court Clerk — finalizing the incorporation of Worthington, Iowa. The formal date of incorporation of Worthington was set as January 10, 1893 when the special election had taken place.

== Geography ==
According to the United States Census Bureau, the city has a total area of 0.39 square miles (1.01 km^{2}), all land.

== Demographics ==
Historical populations
Year	Pop.	±%
1880	169	—
1890	162	−4.1%
1900	288	+77.8%
1910	314	+9.0%
1920	341	+8.6%
1930	335	−1.8%
1940	326	−2.7%
1950	337	+3.4%
1960	360	+6.8%
1970	365	+1.4%
1980	432	+18.4%
1990	439	+1.6%
2000	381	−13.2%
2010	401	+5.2%
2020	382	−4.7%
Source:"U.S. Census website". United States Census Bureau. and Iowa Data Center; Source: U.S. Decennial Census

=== 2020 census ===
As of the census of 2020, there were 382 people, 153 households, and 93 families residing in the city. The population density was 844.9 inhabitants per square mile (326.2/km^{2}). There were 165 housing units at an average density of 364.9 per square mile (140.9/km^{2}). The racial makeup of the city was 99.2% White, 0.0% Black or African American, 0.0% Native American, 0.0% Asian, 0.0% Pacific Islander, 0.0% from other races and 0.8% from two or more races. Hispanic or Latino persons of any race comprised 0.3% of the population.

Of the 153 households, 24.8% of which had children under the age of 18 living with them, 51.6% were married couples living together, 7.2% were cohabitating couples, 20.3% had a female householder with no spouse or partner present and 20.9% had a male householder with no spouse or partner present. 39.2% of all households were non-families. 34.0% of all households were made up of individuals, 17.0% had someone living alone who was 65 years old or older.

The median age in the city was 39.1 years. 24.1% of the residents were under the age of 20; 8.6% were between the ages of 20 and 24; 22.0% were from 25 and 44; 25.7% were from 45 and 64; and 19.6% were 65 years of age or older. The gender makeup of the city was 52.9% male and 47.1% female.

=== 2010 census ===
As of the census of 2010, there were 401 people, 160 households, and 109 families residing in the city. The population density was 1,028.2 inhabitants per square mile (397.0/km^{2}). There were 162 housing units at an average density of 415.4 per square mile (160.4/km^{2}). The racial makeup of the city was 98.5% White, 0.2% African American, and 1.2% from other races. Hispanic or Latino of any race were 1.5% of the population.

There were 160 households, of which 31.9% had children under the age of 18 living with them, 56.3% were married couples living together, 8.1% had a female householder with no husband present, 3.8% had a male householder with no wife present, and 31.9% were non-families. 25.0% of all households were made up of individuals, and 10% had someone living alone who was 65 years of age or older. The average household size was 2.51 and the average family size was 3.05.

The median age in the city was 38.9 years. 26.4% of residents were under the age of 18; 5% were between the ages of 18 and 24; 27.6% were from 25 to 44; 27.9% were from 45 to 64; and 13% were 65 years of age or older. The gender makeup of the city was 50.6% male and 49.4% female.

=== 2000 census ===
As of the census of 2000, there were 381 people, 144 households, and 112 families residing in the city. The population density was 1,228.9 inhabitants per square mile (474.5/km^{2}). There were 147 housing units at an average density of 474.1 per square mile (183.1/km^{2}). The racial makeup of the city was 99.48% White, 0.52% from other races.

There were 144 households, out of which 39.6% had children under the age of 18 living with them, 64.6% were married couples living together, 11.1% had a female householder with no husband present, and 22.2% were non-families. 20.1% of all households were made up of individuals, and 7.6% had someone living alone who was 65 years of age or older. The average household size was 2.65 and the average family size was 3.08.

In the city, the population was spread out, with 27.6% under the age of 18, 8.1% from 18 to 24, 27.0% from 25 to 44, 23.1% from 45 to 64, and 14.2% who were 65 years of age or older. The median age was 37 years. For every 100 females, there were 95.4 males. For every 100 females age 18 and over, there were 97.1 males.

The median income for a household in the city was US$36,250, and the median income for a family was $42,500. Males had a median income of $29,167 versus $18,846 for females. The per capita income for the city was $14,119. About 4.1% of families and 3.9% of the population were below the poverty line, including 4.6% of those under age 18 and 11.6% of those age 65 or over.

== Education ==
Worthington is within the Western Dubuque Community School District. It is zoned to Dyersville Elementary School in Dyersville, Drexler Middle School in Farley, and Western Dubuque High School in Epworth.

St. Paul School, a Catholic school of the Roman Catholic Archdiocese of Dubuque, started circa 1874. In 2015 it had 26 students, and closed that year.

== Notable residents ==
Matt Tobin, American football player for the New England Patriots, is from Worthington.
