= Marquette High School (Iowa) =

Public secondary school in Bellevue, Iowa, United States

Location
- 502 Franklin St. Bellevue, Iowa 52031; United States; 42°15′36″N 90°25′42″W

Information
- Type: Private
- Religious affiliation: Roman Catholic
- Established: 1957
- Oversight: Roman Catholic Archdiocese of Dubuque
- Superintendent: Amy Conlon
- President: Jacleen Kueter
- Rector: Father Jacob Rouse
- Principal: Geoffrey Kaiser
- Grades: K-12
- Gender: Co-educational
- Enrollment: 266 (K-12) (2025-2026)
- Colors: Red and White
- Fight song: Minnesota Rouser
- Mascot: Defenders
- Website: www.marquettecatholic.com

Marquette High School is a private, Roman Catholic high school located in Bellevue, Iowa, United States. It is in the Roman Catholic Archdiocese of Dubuque. It was named for Father Jacques Marquette.

== History ==
Toward the end of the 1950s a movement to provide better education opportunities for the Catholic high school age students resulted in a number of consolidations in the Dubuque Archdioceses. On July 3, 1956, pastors of the parishes surrounding St. Joseph's, Bellevue, held a preliminary meeting to discuss the concept of a central Catholic high school to be opened in the fall of 1957.

The official incorporation of Marquette Catholic School became effective on September 25, 1956. Overseeing the corporation were Archbishop Leo Binz, Monsignor George Biskup as Archdiocesan Vicar General, Father Frederick C. Bahning as Executive Coordinator and two laity Matthew Manders of Bellevue and Reinhold Steines, Sr. of Springbrook. The initial members of the Council of Administration included the pastors of Sts. Peter and Paul's, Springbrook, St. John's, Andrew, St. Joseph's, Bellevue, St. Catherine's, St. Donatus, St. Peter's, Sabula and Sacred Heart, Green Island.

January 17, 1957, St. Joseph's parish made available lot 451, formally part of the playground of St. Joseph's School, for the site of the Marquette building. A one story, brick and glass structure of simple design was planned. Ground was broken for the new building in April 1957. Construction of Marquette Catholic School was completed by October 1957 at a total cost of $199,523. Archbishop Leo Binz dedicated and blessed Marquette Catholic School before a large crowd of parishioners, students, and local dignitaries on October 27, 1957.

The first faculty of Marquette Catholic School was composed of Archdiocesan priests and the Franciscan Sisters of Perpetual Adoration of La Crosse, Wisconsin. Father Frederick C. Bahning of St. Joseph's, Bellevue and Father William J. Tiedeman were full-time teachers and Father Richard R. Krapfl of St. Catherine's, Father Peter M. Graff of St. Donatus and Father Ivan J Boyd of St. Peter's, Sabula and Sacred Heart, Green Island were part-time teachers.

Sister Mary Georgiana Blum was named the first principal of Marquette. Sister Mary Gerardine Bos, Sister Mary Maristelle Massman, Sister Mary Jolene Heue, Sister Mary Rosannita Menke and Sister Mary Edna Wagner made up the rest of the faculty. Enrollment at Marquette varied greatly through the years. One hundred eighty-nine were enrolled the first year. When the Holy Rosary High School in LaMotte closed in 1965, the Marquette corporation was reorganized to include Holy Rosary parish. As a result, enrollment at Marquette Catholic School increased to 266 and two lay teachers and three religious sisters were added to the faculty. The highest enrollment recorded at Marquette Catholic School was 318 students in 1972. A new pitched roof was added to the school during the summer of 1988. A gable was also added to the north doors to enhance the appearance of the front entrance.

On December 10, 1996, the Marquette Educational Center (MEC) opened its doors. The gymnasium is part of the Lynch Auditorium, which is named after Fr. Mick Lynch, and includes a stage and four locker rooms. Fr. Mick Lynch, a former principal and a long-time Marquette supporter, along with his father, matched 10% of the money raised by the end of 1998, up to $1,000,000. The new center also features an ICN - Iowa Communications Network room that allows students to attend college accredited courses via video conferencing. The capital campaign, named Commitment to Our Future, raised $900,000 with major support from the community as a whole. Prism, of Keiler, Wisconsin, was the general contractor with help from over fifty students and parents.

In 2014 St. Joseph's Catholic Church and Marquette Schools purchased Fifth Street between Franklin and Park streets from the City of Bellevue as part of an expansion project. Construction included the addition of a multipurpose room and "parish center" where Fifth Street once existed, connecting all campus buildings excluding the church. The parish demolished the historic St. Joseph's Middle School building built in 1930 in favor of 45 new parking spaces. The project was completed in 2017.

== Athletics ==
Marquette Catholic offers baseball, softball, boys cross country, girls cross country, volleyball, boys basketball, girls basketball, boys golf, girls golf, and soccer. Marquette students are also able to compete with Wahlert Catholic High School in Dubuque, Iowa in swimming. Marquette students are also able to compete with Bellevue High School in Bellevue, Iowa in football, track, boys bowling, and wrestling.

Marquette was formerly a member of the Big East Conference. Beginning in the 2013-2014 school year, Marquette Catholic Schools became a member in the newly expanded Tri-Rivers Conference.
