= St. Mary's Academy Historic District =

St. Mary's Academy Historic District may refer to:

- St. Mary's Academy Historic District (Monroe, Michigan), listed on the National Register of Historic Places in Monroe County, Michigan
- St. Mary's Academy Historic District (Silver City, New Mexico), listed on the National Register of Historic Places in Grant County, New Mexico
