= St. Mary's School (Guttenberg, Iowa) =

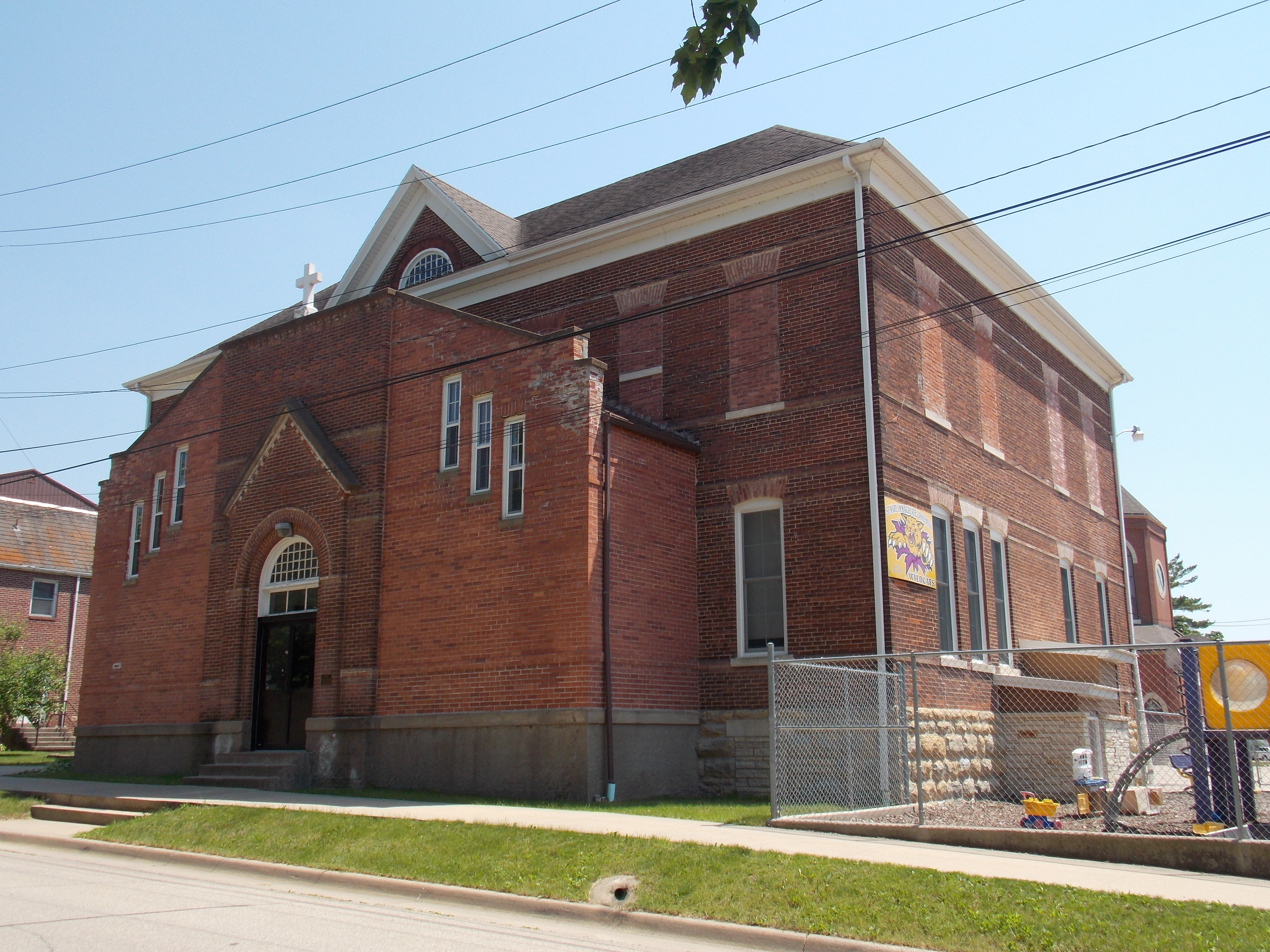
- Guttenberg, Iowa

Information
- Type: Private, coeducational
- Religious affiliation: Roman Catholic
- Established: 1851
- Grades: K-8 (formerly had 9-12)
- High school closed 1968

St. Mary IC School is a Roman Catholic K-8 school in Guttenberg, Iowa, United States. It formerly had a high school division that operated from 1921 to 1968. It is within the Roman Catholic Archdiocese of Dubuque.

== History ==
The early clergy for this French and German immigrant people were missionaries traveling the Mississippi as early as 1833. The first resident pastor, Rev. G.H. Plahte, was assigned in 1851. The most significant pastor, in relation to St. Mary School, was Rev. J. H. Brinkmann, who built the present (junior high) brick structure in 1894 and the high school addition in 1921. In 1894 the enrollment was 160, with four Sisters teaching.

The school opened in 1853, and it received a two-story facility in 1860. It had 72 students in 1882. The school had four faculty, all nuns, and 160 students in 1894, when the current building was constructed at a cost of $5000. The brick building had a bluff stone basement and was at the dimensions 50 feet (15 m) by 70 feet (21 m). Groundbreaking was June 13, 1894.

Initially a grade school, it received a high school section which had its building constructed in 1921 and in 1925 received accreditation. A new elementary building was constructed in 1962 for $130,000. In 1968, Immaculate Conception School in North Buena Vista merged into St. Mary's and the high school closed. The high school closed as part of the Archdiocesan reorganization of schools.

Circa 2000 145 students attended the school.

== Religious who served St. Mary ==
Through the years, Sisters of various communities have staffed St. Mary School: Franciscan Sisters of Perpetual Adoration from LaCrosse, Sisters of St. Francis of Dubuque, Sisters of Notre Dame of Omaha, Sisters of Mercy from Detroit and Sisters of Charity, BVM, of Dubuque.
