= Holy Family Catholic Schools =

Coordinates: 42.518°N 90.706°W

Holy Family Catholic Schools Logo

Holy Family Catholic Schools (HFCS) is a Roman Catholic school system based in Dubuque, Iowa (USA). Holy Family, which operates schools in eastern Dubuque County, is a part of the Roman Catholic Archdiocese of Dubuque. As of the 2011–2012 school year, HFCS has 1,837 students enrolled in its schools (excluding preschools).

== General information ==
HFCS currently operates:

- 3 elementary schools
- 1 middle school
- 1 high school
- 5 early childhood centers

== Schools ==
Early Childhood Centers

- Holy Family Early Childhood

Elementary Schools

- Resurrection Elementary School
- St. Anthony/Our Lady of Guadalupe Spanish Immersion Program
- St. Columbkille Elementary School

Middle school

- Mazzuchelli Catholic Middle School

High school

- Wahlert Catholic High School

=== Former schools ===
Former elementary schools

- Downtown Catholic School
- Holy Ghost School
- Sacred Heart-Holy Trinity School
- St. Anthony School
- St. Francis School

In 2019 the school system considered whether to close Holy Ghost School, which had 75 students, and/or St. Anthony School, which had 79 students. The decision was to close both effective 2020.

Downtown Catholic School (St. Mary-St. Patrick Consolidation) and Sacred Heart – Holy Trinity School became St. Francis School in 2002, and St. Francis closed in 2004. Four Oaks Family and Children Services bought the school building in 2006.

=== Enrollment ===
In the 2009-2010 school year, there were 2,113 students attending Holy Family Catholic Schools (including pre-K). Of those, 1,945 (92%) were white, 21 (1%) were black, 26 (1.2%) were Asian, 57 (2.7%) students were Hispanic, and 1 was American Indian. Additionally, 1,058 (50%) were male, and 1,055 (50%) were female.

== History ==
In July 2001, Wahlert High School and all Dubuque Catholic elementary schools and Catholic early childhood centers joined to become one system under the name Holy Family Catholic Schools. This step was taken in an effort to continue making Catholic elementary and secondary schools in Dubuque available and accessible to all those who choose Catholic education.

== See also ==
- Dubuque, Iowa
- List of school districts in Iowa
