= North Buena Vista, Iowa =

- City
- Location of North Buena Vista, Iowa
- Coordinates: 42°40′41″N 90°57′29″W
- Country: United States
- State: Iowa
- County: Clayton

Area
  - Total: 0.96 sq mi (2.49 km^{2})
  - Land: 0.93 sq mi (2.40 km^{2})
  - Water: 0.035 sq mi (0.09 km^{2})
- Elevation: 673 ft (205 m)

Population (2020)
  - Total: 109
  - Density: 117.5/sq mi (45.35/km^{2})
- Time zone: UTC-6 (Central (CST))
  - Summer (DST): UTC-5 (CDT)
- ZIP code: 52066
- Area code: 563
- FIPS code: 19-57135
- GNIS feature ID: 2395251

North Buena Vista is a city in Clayton County, Iowa, United States. The population was 109 at the time of the 2020 census, down from 124 in 2000.

== Geography ==
According to the United States Census Bureau, the city has a total area of 1.04 square miles (2.69 km^{2}), of which 1.00 square mile (2.59 km^{2}) is land and 0.04 square miles (0.10 km^{2}) is water.

== Picnic ==
The Buenie Picnic has been held since 1929, on the Sunday of Labor Day weekend, as a benefit by the local Immaculate Conception Catholic Church. In 1971 the picnic was raided and parish priest Rev. Carl Ruhland was charged with "running a gambling house". He was fined $100. Following that incident, in 1973, the Iowa Legislature legalized bingo, raffles and other low-stakes games of chance.

== Demographics ==
Historical populations
Year	Pop.	±%
1910	162	—
1920	144	−11.1%
1930	183	+27.1%
1940	203	+10.9%
1950	148	−27.1%
1960	150	+1.4%
1970	118	−21.3%
1980	155	+31.4%
1990	145	−6.5%
2000	124	−14.5%
2010	121	−2.4%
2020	109	−9.9%
Source:"U.S. Census website". United States Census Bureau. and Iowa Data Center; Source: U.S. Decennial Census

=== 2020 census ===
As of the census of 2020, there were 109 people, 54 households, and 33 families residing in the city. The population density was 117.5 inhabitants per square mile (45.4/km^{2}). There were 136 housing units at an average density of 146.6 per square mile (56.6/km^{2}). The racial makeup of the city was 99.1% White, 0.9% Black or African American, 0.0% Native American, 0.0% Asian, 0.0% Pacific Islander, 0.0% from other races and 0.0% from two or more races. Hispanic or Latino people of any race comprised 0.0% of the population.

Of the 54 households, 24.1% of which had children under the age of 18 living with them, 51.9% were married couples living together, 9.3% were cohabitating couples, 14.8% had a female householder with no spouse or partner present and 24.1% had a male householder with no spouse or partner present. 38.9% of all households were non-families. 33.3% of all households were made up of individuals, 18.5% had someone living alone who was 65 years old or older.

The median age in the city was 57.4 years. 18.3% of the residents were under the age of 20; 2.8% were between the ages of 20 and 24; 11.0% were from 25 and 44; 44.0% were from 45 and 64; and 23.9% were 65 years of age or older. The gender makeup of the city was 53.2% male and 46.8% female.

=== 2010 census ===
As of the census of 2010, there were 121 people, 63 households, and 34 families living in the city. The population density was 121.0 inhabitants per square mile (46.7/km^{2}). There were 157 housing units at an average density of 157.0 per square mile (60.6/km^{2}). The racial makeup of the city was 98.3% White, 0.8% Asian, and 0.8% from two or more races.

There were 63 households, of which 9.5% had children under the age of 18 living with them, 47.6% were married couples living together, 6.3% had a female householder with no husband present, and 46.0% were non-families. 41.3% of all households were made up of individuals, and 6.4% had someone living alone who was 65 years of age or older. The average household size was 1.92 and the average family size was 2.53.

The median age in the city was 49.9 years. 12.4% of residents were under the age of 18; 5.8% were between the ages of 18 and 24; 14.9% were from 25 to 44; 45.4% were from 45 to 64; and 21.5% were 65 years of age or older. The gender makeup of the city was 57.0% male and 43.0% female.

=== 2000 census ===
As of the census of 2000, there were 124 people, 54 households, and 34 families living in the city. The population density was 178.4 inhabitants per square mile (68.9/km^{2}). There were 146 housing units at an average density of 210.1 per square mile (81.1/km^{2}). The racial makeup of the city was 99.19% White, and 0.81% from two or more races. Hispanic or Latino people of any race were 0.81% of the population.

There were 54 households, out of which 31.5% had children under the age of 18 living with them, 51.9% were married couples living together, 5.6% had a female householder with no husband present, and 35.2% were non-families. 25.9% of all households were made up of individuals, and 9.3% had someone living alone who was 65 years of age or older. The average household size was 2.30 and the average family size was 2.80.

In the city, the population was spread out, with 22.6% under the age of 18, 9.7% from 18 to 24, 31.5% from 25 to 44, 26.6% from 45 to 64, and 9.7% who were 65 years of age or older. The median age was 38 years. For every 100 females, there were 113.8 males. For every 100 females age 18 and over, there were 108.7 males.

The median income for a household in the city was $20,625, and the median income for a family was $38,750. Males had a median income of $21,875 versus $17,361 for females. The per capita income for the city was $12,729. There were 25.0% of families and 13.8% of the population living below the poverty line, including no under eighteens and none of those over 64.

== Education ==
Public schools are operated by the Clayton Ridge Community School District, which was formed in 2005 in the merger of the Guttenberg Community School District and the Garnavillo Community School District.

Immaculate Conception School, under the Roman Catholic Archdiocese of Dubuque, was in operation until it merged into St. Mary's Catholic School in Guttenberg in 1968.

== Cemetery ==
The Immaculate Conception Catholic Cemetery is located on the top of a hill a short distance from the Immaculate Conception Church.

There is a pioneer cemetery, or old city cemetery Buena Vista, located off of Country Lane.

== Transportation ==
Passenger train service was provided to North Buena Vista throughout its early history. Trains ran from La Crosse along the west bank of the Mississippi River through North Buena Vista to Dubuque. This service gradually decreased in the first half of the twentieth century and was discontinued on June 8, 1951.
