= Holy Trinity Catholic Church (Luxemburg, Iowa) =

Church building in Iowa, United States of America

Coordinates: 42.602776°N 91.074615°W

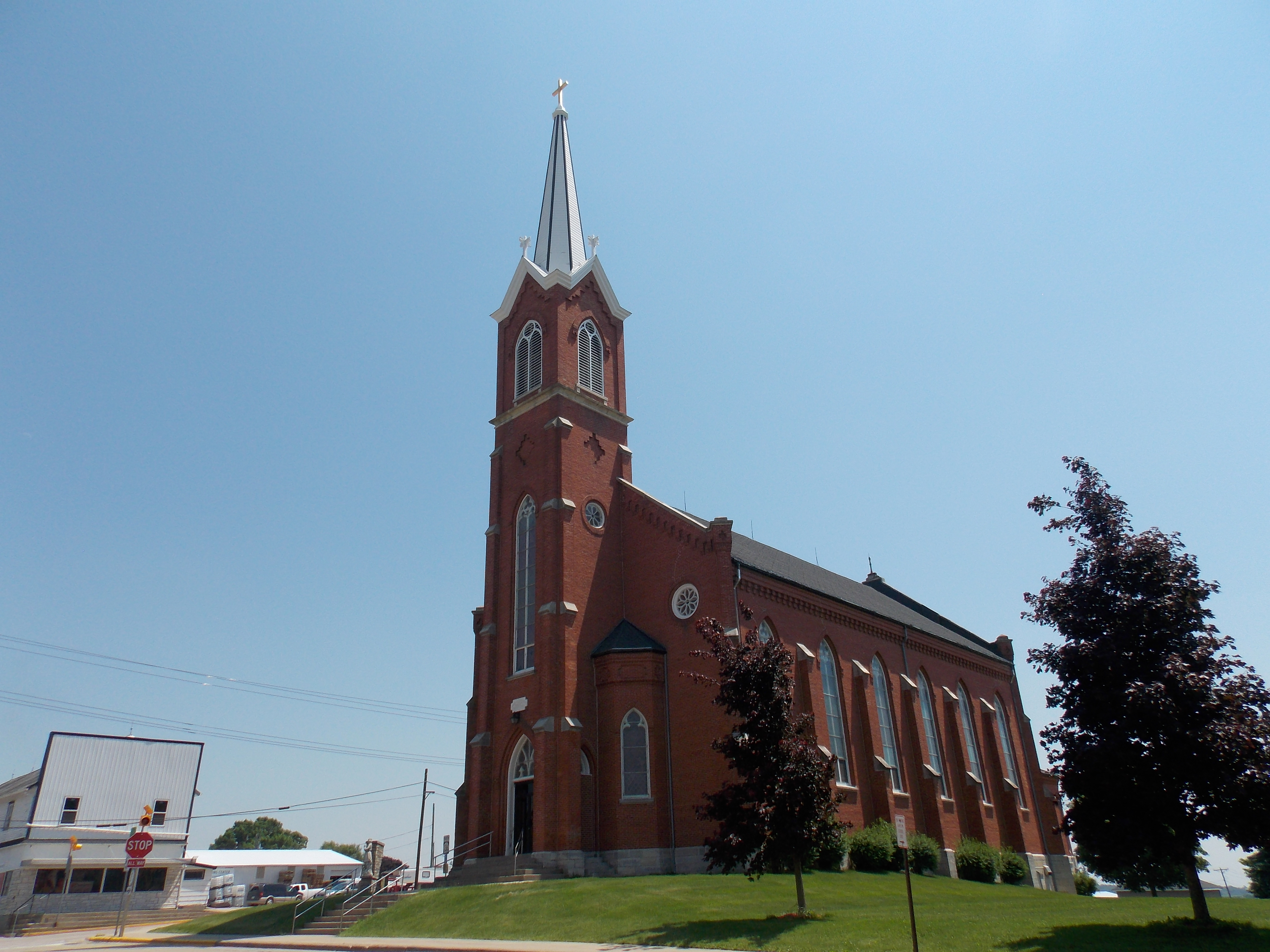
Exterior

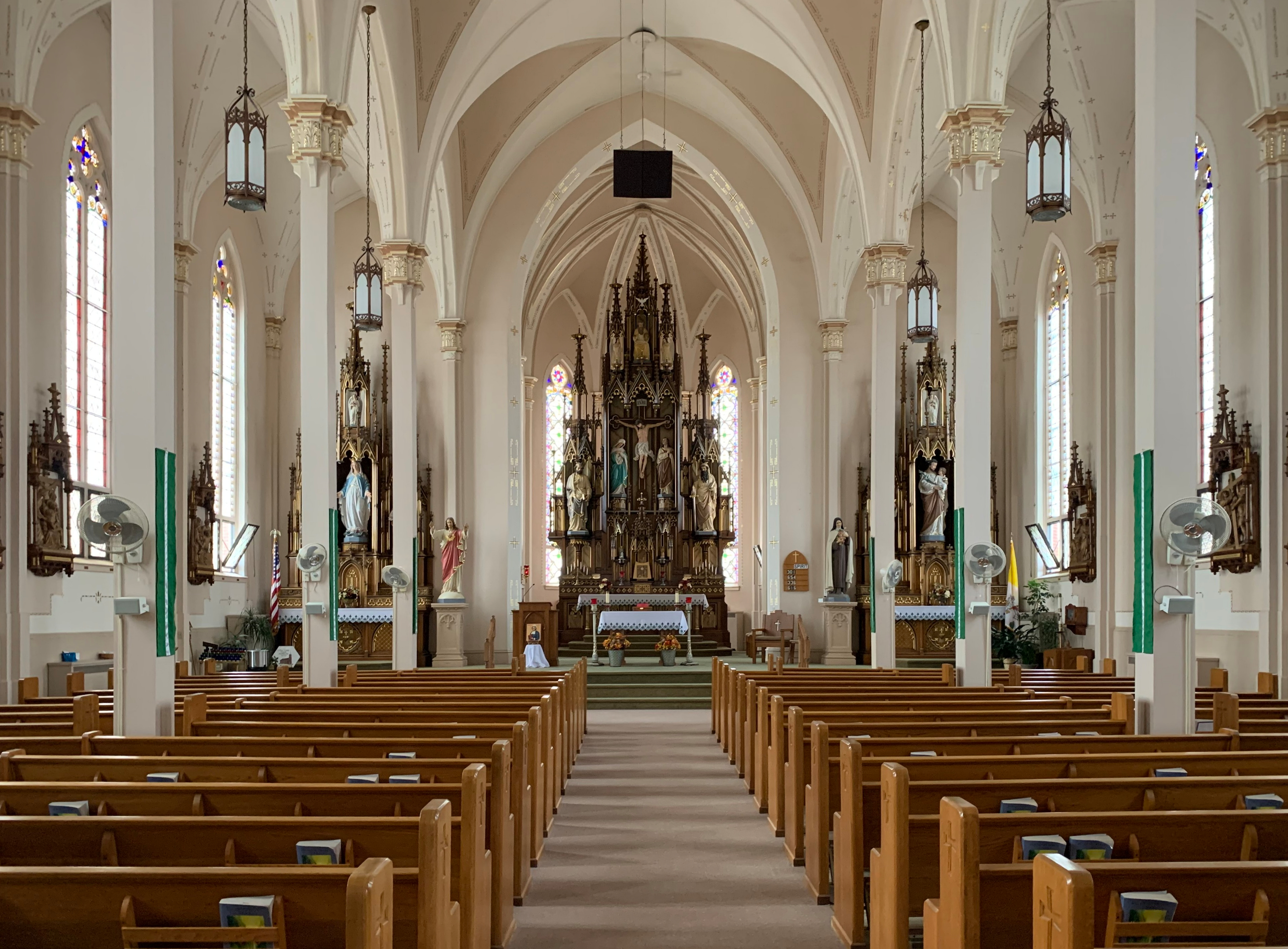
Interior

Holy Trinity Catholic Church is a Roman Catholic church of the Archdiocese of Dubuque, located in Luxemburg, Iowa.

The parish dates back to the 1850s when families living in the area requested a church from Diocesan officials. Construction on the current church building began in 1874 and was completed in 1875. The church later became part of the St. LaSalle Pastorate - which is a parish that covers the churches in the Iowa towns of Luxemburg, Balltown, Holy Cross, Rickardsville, and Sherrill.

On August 9, 2010, the church was damaged in a fire which destroyed the steeple. Shortly after 2am, it's believed that lightning struck the steeple and ignited the blaze. Firefighters from several communities responded, and while the steeple was destroyed they were able to keep the fire from spreading to the church itself.
