= Sacred Heart School (Dubuque, Iowa) =

- U.S. National Register of Historic Places
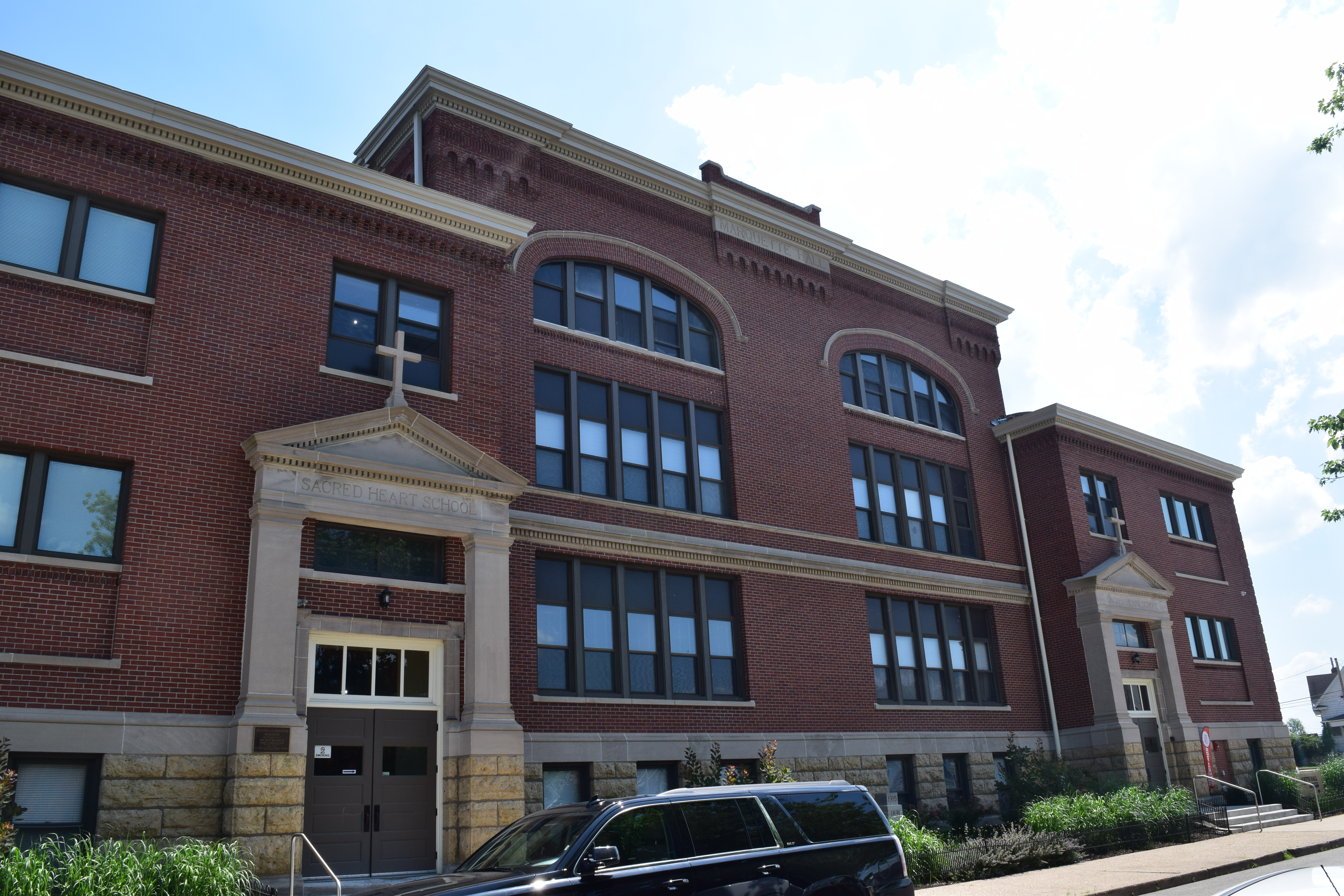

- Location within Iowa Location within the United States
- Location: 2238 Queen St. Dubuque, Iowa
- Coordinates: 42°31′00.8″N 90°40′01.9″W
- Area: less than one acre
- Built: 1915
- Architect: Fridolin J. Heer & Son
- NRHP reference No.: 100002486
- Added to NRHP: June 1, 2018

Sacred Heart School is a historic building in Dubuque, Iowa, United States. Completed in 1915, the building replaced Marquette Hall near Sacred Heart Church that had been built in 1888. It was designed by the Dubuque architectural firm of Fridolin J. Heer & Son. While the firm has several of its designs represented on the National Register of Historic Places, this is the only school building. The Sisters of St. Francis from Dubuque and lay teachers taught in the school, which had 640 students when it opened. Its early principals were laymen until 1952 when a Sister became the principal. A ninth-grade class for boys was begun in 1930 and tenth grade was added two years later. The high school program was discontinued in 1949 due to a teacher shortage. Enrollment in school was 900 in 1953 and 1,020, excluding the kindergarten, in 1956. The kindergarten program was discontinued the following year because of a lack of classroom space. Eventually, the school itself was closed.

The former school building was listed on the National Register of Historic Places in 2018. It is being converted into moderate-income housing. The historic status stems from its architect and its closeness to other church buildings.
