= St. Lucas, Iowa =

- City
- Location of St. Lucas, Iowa
- Coordinates: 43°03′59″N 91°56′03″W
- Country: United States
- State: Iowa
- County: Fayette
- Incorporated: March 6, 1900

Area
  - Total: 0.25 sq mi (0.66 km^{2})
  - Land: 0.25 sq mi (0.66 km^{2})
  - Water: 0 sq mi (0.00 km^{2})
- Elevation: 1,056 ft (322 m)

Population (2020)
  - Total: 167
  - Density: 657.0/sq mi (253.66/km^{2})
- Time zone: UTC-6 (Central (CST))
  - Summer (DST): UTC-5 (CDT)
- FIPS code: 19-70050
- GNIS feature ID: 2396501
- Website: www.stlucasia.com

St. Lucas or Saint Lucas is a city in Fayette County, Iowa, United States. The population was 167 at the time of the 2020 census.

== Geography ==
According to the United States Census Bureau, the city has a total area of 0.27 square miles (0.70 km^{2}), all land.

== Demographics ==
Historical populations
Year	Pop.	±%
1910	138	—
1920	137	−0.7%
1930	168	+22.6%
1940	158	−6.0%
1950	158	+0.0%
1960	211	+33.5%
1970	194	−8.1%
1980	194	+0.0%
1990	174	−10.3%
2000	178	+2.3%
2010	143	−19.7%
2020	167	+16.8%
Source:"U.S. Census website". United States Census Bureau. and Iowa Data Center; Source: U.S. Decennial Census

=== 2020 census ===
As of the census of 2020, there were 167 people, 74 households, and 44 families residing in the city. The population density was 657.0 inhabitants per square mile (253.7/km^{2}). There were 84 housing units at an average density of 330.5 per square mile (127.6/km^{2}). The racial makeup of the city was 98.8% White, 0.0% Black or African American, 0.0% Native American, 0.0% Asian, 0.0% Pacific Islander, 1.2% from other races and 0.0% from two or more races. Hispanic or Latino persons of any race comprised 0.0% of the population.

Of the 74 households, 27.0% of which had children under the age of 18 living with them, 52.7% were married couples living together, 4.1% were cohabitating couples, 23.0% had a female householder with no spouse or partner present and 20.3% had a male householder with no spouse or partner present. 40.5% of all households were non-families. 32.4% of all households were made up of individuals, 17.6% had someone living alone who was 65 years old or older.

The median age in the city was 38.9 years. 26.9% of the residents were under the age of 20; 3.6% were between the ages of 20 and 24; 24.6% were from 25 and 44; 22.2% were from 45 and 64; and 22.8% were 65 years of age or older. The gender makeup of the city was 46.7% male and 53.3% female.

=== 2010 census ===
As of the census of 2010, there were 143 people, 73 households, and 44 families living in the city. The population density was 529.6 inhabitants per square mile (204.5/km^{2}). There were 85 housing units at an average density of 314.8 per square mile (121.5/km^{2}). The racial makeup of the city was 100.0% White.

There were 73 households, of which 17.8% had children under the age of 18 living with them, 50.7% were married couples living together, 2.7% had a female householder with no husband present, 6.8% had a male householder with no wife present, and 39.7% were non-families. 35.6% of all households were made up of individuals, and 20.6% had someone living alone who was 65 years of age or older. The average household size was 1.96 and the average family size was 2.43.

The median age in the city was 52.5 years. 11.9% of residents were under the age of 18; 9.8% were between the ages of 18 and 24; 17.5% were from 25 to 44; 28% were from 45 to 64; and 32.9% were 65 years of age or older. The gender makeup of the city was 51.7% male and 48.3% female.

=== 2000 census ===
As of the census of 2000, there were 178 people, 83 households, and 54 families living in the city. The population density was 664.1 inhabitants per square mile (256.4/km^{2}). There were 84 housing units at an average density of 313.4 per square mile (121.0/km^{2}). The racial makeup of the city was 100.00% White.

There were 83 households, out of which 20.5% had children under the age of 18 living with them, 57.8% were married couples living together, 4.8% had a female householder with no husband present, and 34.9% were non-families. 30.1% of all households were made up of individuals, and 24.1% had someone living alone who was 65 years of age or older. The average household size was 2.14 and the average family size was 2.67.

In the city, the population was spread out, with 15.2% under the age of 18, 5.6% from 18 to 24, 27.0% from 25 to 44, 14.0% from 45 to 64, and 38.2% who were 65 years of age or older. The median age was 47 years. For every 100 females, there were 102.3 males. For every 100 females age 18 and over, there were 98.7 males.

The median income for a household in the city was $35,625, and the median income for a family was $42,500. Males had a median income of $29,792 versus $19,583 for females. The per capita income for the city was $25,612. About 8.3% of families and 9.5% of the population were below the poverty line, including none of those under the age of eighteen and 21.4% of those 65 or over.

== Education ==
The municipality is within the Turkey Valley Community School District.

== Notable person ==
Father Aloysius Schmitt (1909–1941), the first chaplain to die in World War II, on board the USS Oklahoma during the Pearl Harbor bombing
