= Don Bosco High School (Iowa) =

Private secondary school in Gilbertville, Iowa, United States

Location
- 405 16th Avenue; Gilbertville, (Black Hawk County), Iowa 50634; United States
- Coordinates: 42°25′5″N 92°12′55″W

Information
- Type: Private, Coeducational
- Religious affiliation: Roman Catholic
- Established: 1956
- School district: Bosco System Catholic Schools
- Principal: Shelby Douglas
- Grades: 9–12
- Average class size: 20-30 students per class
- Hours in school day: 7.5
- Colors: Royal Blue, {[Gold
- Fight song: Minnesota Rouser
- Athletics conference: Iowa Star Conference
- Mascot: Dons
- Newspaper: The Spirit [Retired]
- Feeder schools: Immaculate Conception Catholic School, Gilbertville; St. Anthanasius Catholic School, Jesup; St. John's Catholic School, Independence
- Website: http://www.boscocatholic.org/

Don Bosco High School is a private, Roman Catholic high school in Gilbertville, Iowa, United States. It is located in the Roman Catholic Archdiocese of Dubuque.

== History ==
The planning for a new high school first began in 1955 with the appointment of Rev. Wilbur W. Ziegler as administrator of Immaculate Conception parish in Gilbertville. Archbishop Leo Binz requested that Rev. Ziegler work with local parishes to improve the quality of Catholic education in the area. On December 8, 1955, only two days after his arrival, Rev. Ziegler assured parishioners that he would do all he could to assist in building a high school that would satisfy the educational and spiritual needs of the parishes' students.

The first meeting to discuss a new high school was held on February 7, 1956. Pastors from St. Athanasius - Jesup, St. Francis - Barclay, St. Joseph's - Raymond, St. Mary's - Eagle Center, Sacred Heart - La Porte City, and Immaculate Conception - Gilbertville were present. These pastors successfully petitioned for the organization and construction of a Catholic central high school. With the archbishop's approval, Gilbertville was officially chosen as the location for the school and Rev. Donald F. Sweeney was appointed executive coordinator for the new high school.

Building began in July 1956 on a strip of land donated and cleared by Immaculate Conception parish. About eight hundred trees were felled that summer and 65,000 cubic yards of dirt were hauled to prepare the land for the athletic field and building site. The building itself was contracted to cost no more than $145,865 with each of the six parishes contributing toward the cost.

Registration for the first year of Don Bosco High School took place August 26–28, 1956. After careful preparations by Rev. Sweeney, Sr. Mary Angela Shier, principal, and three other School Sister of Notre Dame from Mankato, Minnesota, the school year began September 4, 1956 with 170 students. In celebration of the new year and the new school, a Votive Mass was offered in honor of the Holy Spirit by Monsignor Cremer.

With the support of the local parishes as well as generous individuals, building improvements have continued at Don Bosco. In 1957, the auditorium-gymnasium was added to the building. A twenty-five room addition was built in 1964 providing new areas for a library, science labs, band, home economics, and additional classrooms. With the generous assistance of alumni, a wrestling room and, more recently, technology labs have been added. Substantial community involvement in the "For a Brighter Future" development fund, begun in 1990, has also contributed to many of the school's improvements.

Since its foundation, nearly 3,000 students have attended Don Bosco High School. Enrollment has varied from 161 students to 406 students over the school's history; 223 students are enrolled in the 1999-2000 school year. Don Bosco provides an academic program which includes emphasis on Catholic teachings within an atmosphere of Christian living. Accredited by the State of Iowa, Don Bosco offers its students a full range of courses in business education, general education, and college preparatory. Extra-curricular opportunities have adapted to meet students' changing interests and needs, including dramatics, speech, music ministry, band, concert choir, student council, sports, publications, photography, Shakespeare after Hours, and National Honor Society.

== Athletics ==
Don Bosco has won 32 state titles (as of the end of the 2024-2025 school year): 26 in wrestling, 4 in football, and 2 in baseball.

Fall Sports

- Cross Country
- Football - Program started in 2004.
  - State Champions - 2013, 2016, 2017, 2019
- Volleyball
- Cheerleading

Winter Sports

- Boys Basketball
- Girls Basketball
- Wrestling
  - Traditional State Champions - 1979, 1981, 1985, 1987, 2006, 2007, 2008, 2009, 2010, 2012, 2019, 2020, 2022, 2023, 2024, 2025
  - State Dual-meet Champions - 1995, 2002, 2005, 2006, 2007, 2008, 2009, 2010, 2018, 2019, 2021, 2022, 2023, 2024, 2025
- Dance Team
- Cheerleading

Spring Sports

- Golf
- Track & Field

Summer Sports

- Baseball
  - State Champions - 1978, 2020
- Softball

== See also ==
- List of school districts in Iowa
- List of high schools in Iowa
