= Columbus High School (Waterloo, Iowa) =

Secondary school in Iowa, United States

Columbus Catholic High School (CHS)
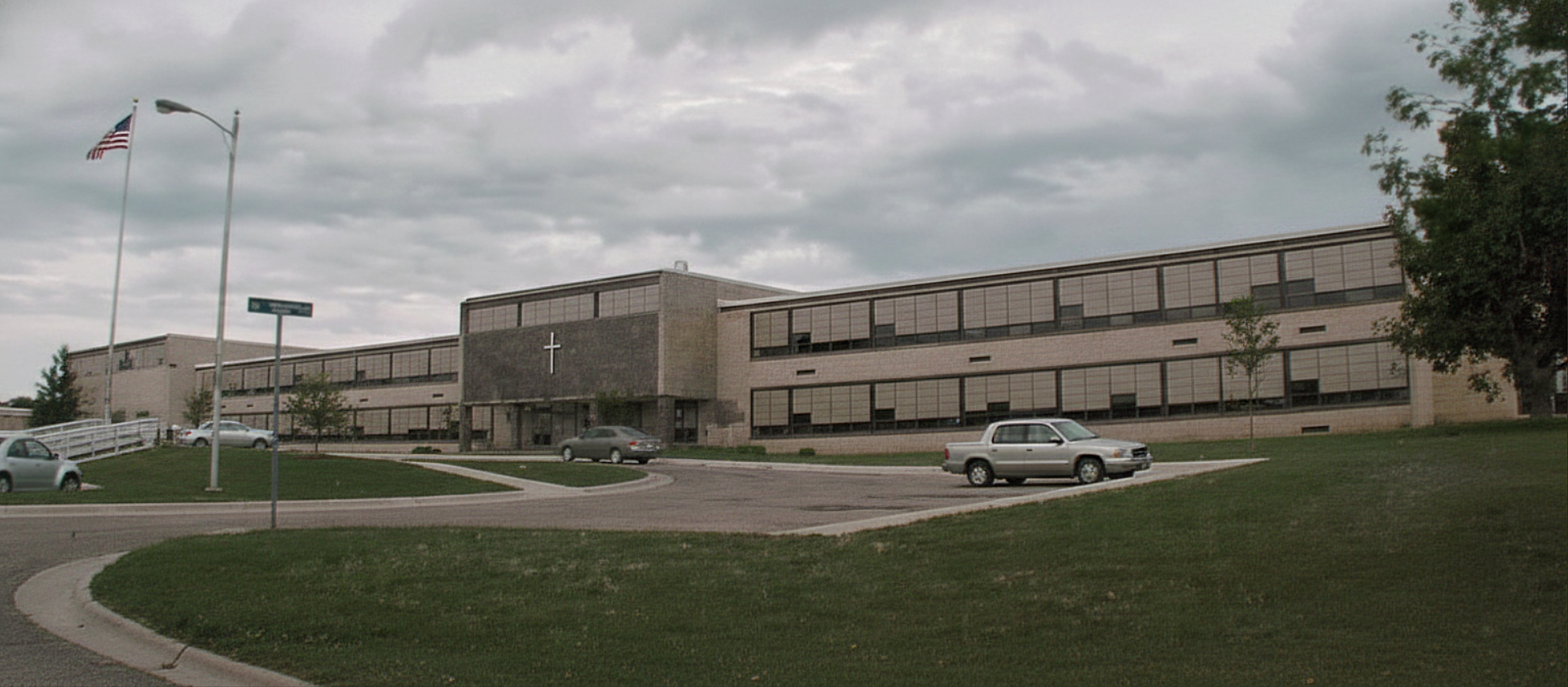

Location
- 3231 West 9th Street; Waterloo, Black Hawk County, Iowa 50702; United States; 42°27′50″N 92°20′37″W

Information
- Type: Private, coed
- Religious affiliation: Roman Catholic
- Established: 1959
- Principal: Tom Novotney
- Grades: 9–12
- Enrollment: 262 (2025-2026)
- Student to teacher ratio: 16:1
- Colors: Green and white
- Athletics conference: North Iowa Cedar League
- Team name: Sailors
- Activities Director: Julie Girsch
- Website: cvcatholic.org/columbus-catholic-high-school

Columbus High School (CHS), also known as Columbus Catholic High School, is a Catholic high school in Waterloo, Iowa, United States. It is located in the Roman Catholic Archdiocese of Dubuque and is part of the Cedar Valley Catholic School system.

== History ==
Columbus High School opened with a class of 406 boys and 431 girls on August 31, 1959, following a three-year fund-raising effort. The school's primary advocate, Father A.A. McAvoy, began directing fundraising efforts in 1956. By 1959, McAvoy's efforts had yielded nearly two million dollars in pledges. In 1958, the cornerstone was blessed by Archbishop Leo Binz.

Father John Paar was named principal later that year and served for 10 years. In 1968, Father Walter Brunkan, the assistant principal, was promoted to principal and remained in that role for over 20 years. In 1991, he was reassigned to St. Mary Catholic Church in Greene, Iowa, and Michael Palmer became the first lay principal. Palmer retired in 1999, and assistant principal Todd Dirth became principal, serving from 1999 until December 2003. John Carlucci served as the interim principal the remainder of that school year, and Richard Caye served as the principal for the 2004/2005 school year. The current principal, Tom Ulses, was appointed in 2005.

The Columbus High School campus now also includes Blessed Maria Assunta Pallotta Catholic Middle School, serving grades 6 through 8. The middle school was established in August 2012, drawing students from Blessed Sacrament, Sacred Heart and St. Edward elementary schools.

== Athletics ==
The Sailors compete in the North Iowa Cedar League Conference in the following sports:

- Bowling
- Cross country (boys' and girls')
  - Boys' 3-time State Champions (1969, 1971, 1972)
- Volleyball
  - 2017 Class 3A State Champions
- Football
  - 3-time State Champions (1976, 1986, 2004)
- Basketball (boys' and girls')
  - Girls' 1990 State Champions
- Wrestling
  - 2004 Class 2A State Champions
- Track and field (boys' and girls')
- Golf (boys' and girls')
  - Boys' 8-time State Champions (1969, 1987, 1999, 2000, 2002, 2004, 2012, 2013)
  - Coed State Champions - 1969
- Baseball (boys')
- Softball (girls')
- Soccer (boys' and girls')
  - Boys' 2012 Class 1A State Champions
- Tennis (boys' and girls')
  - Boys' 2010 Class 1A State Champions

== Notable alumni ==
- Raja Chari (born 1977), astronaut
- Tim Cordes, physician
- Michael Hogan (born 1943), academic and historian
- Kim Jones (born 1952), former American football player
- Chris Klieman (born 1967), American football coach
- Larry Nemmers (born 1943), American football official
- Ben Sinnott (born 2002), American football player
- Tracie Spencer (born 1976), singer-songwriter, actress and model

== See also ==
- List of high schools in Iowa
