= Newman Catholic High School (Iowa) =

Private secondary school in Mason City, Iowa, United States

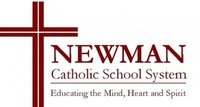

Location
- 2445 19th Street SW; Mason City, Iowa 50401-6234; United States; 43°7′59″N 93°14′17″W

Information
- Type: Private, Coeducational
- Religious affiliation: Roman Catholic
- Established: 1960
- Oversight: Archdiocese of Dubuque
- Administrator: Tony Adams
- Grades: 9–12
- Enrollment: 175 (2015)
- Student to teacher ratio: 11:1
- Colors: Cardinal Red and White
- Fight song: Newman Forever - Written by Meredith Willson (4/18/1961)
- Athletics conference: Top of Iowa
- Nickname: Knights
- Newspaper: N/A
- Yearbook: Newman Knightlfe
- Tuition: $3,515 $4,725 (out of parish)
- Website: newmancatholic.org

Newman Catholic High School is a private, Roman Catholic high school in Mason City, Iowa. It is located in the Roman Catholic Archdiocese of Dubuque.

== Background ==
Originally, Newman Catholic was built as Central Catholic High School to serve several parishes in the North Iowa area. Newman Catholic High School was established in 1960 with the guidance of Rev. William Powers. Newman is one of two high schools in Mason City, the other being the public Mason City High School.

Newman Catholic High School is connected to Newman Catholic Middle School, Newman Catholic Elementary School, and Newman Catholic Daycare. This one building is a part of a campus with a track, football field, baseball diamond and softball diamond.

History of Principals
1960-1967 Fr. Norman White
1967-1970 Fr. Donald Hawes
1970-1978 Fr. John McClean
1978-1981 Fr. Ken Gehling
1981-1991 Fr. Wayne Ressler
1991-1991 Fr. Kopacek
1991-1992 SR. Walter Marie
1992-1994 Mr. Don Greenlee
1994-1998 Mrs. Vicki Steil
1998-2007 Mr. Mike Kavars
2007-Current Mr. Tony Adams

== Athletics ==
Newman has a wide variety of athletic programs for students to participate in. These programs include football, volleyball, cross country, football cheerleading, competition cheer, girls’ basketball, boys’ basketball wrestling, dance team, basketball cheerleading, wrestling cheerleading, girls’ track, boys’ track, girls’ golf, boys’ golf, baseball, and softball, all of which compete as the Knights. Participation in sports such as tennis, swimming, hockey and soccer, which Newman does not offer, is available through cooperation with the Mason City Public High School. The Knights participate in the Top of Iowa Conference.

== Service Program ==
Newman Catholic requires its students to complete 50 hours of service before graduation. This program is based on a four-year student, requiring 12.5 hours of service a year (6.25 hours a semester) to reach the mandatory 50 hours. The purpose of this program is to “Promote a spirit of Christian service among the students and challenges them to use their gifts, talents, and time for the service of others," (Veselis). There are many opportunities for students to complete their hours through school or church-sponsored events, such as God's Portion Day or parish festivals. Students cannot be paid for their service and the work they do must be outside their normal household chores. This program is widely supported because of the opportunity it gives students “to put their faith into action by selflessly involving themselves in a variety of the service projects which benefit the school, the Church, and community,” (Veselis).

== Notable alumni ==
- Bryce Ball, professional baseball first baseman who is a free agent
- Trevor Penning, American professional football offensive tackle for the Los Angeles Chargers

== See also ==
- List of high schools in Iowa
