= Saint Mary's Catholic Church (Dubuque, Iowa) =

- St. Mary's Catholic Church; Historic District
- U.S. National Register of Historic Places
- U.S. Historic district
- U.S. Historic district – Contributing property
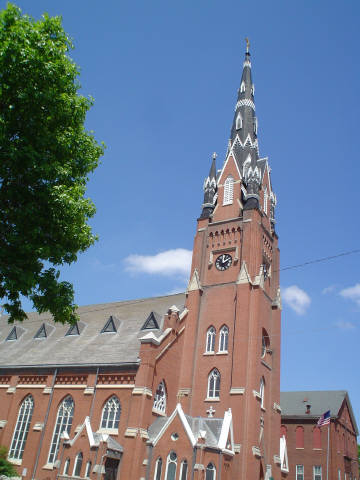

- Location within Iowa Location within the United States
- Location: 105 E. 15th, 1584 White, 1501 & 1561 Jackson Sts., Dubuque, Iowa
- Coordinates: 42°30′29″N 90°40′01″W
- Built: 1864-1867 (church)
- Architect: John Mullany (church)
- Architectural style: Gothic Revival (church)
- Part of: Washington Residential Historic District (ID15000725)
- NRHP reference No.: 15000436

Significant dates
- Added to NRHP: July 21, 2015
- Designated CP: October 13, 2015

Saint Mary's Catholic Church is a former parish of the Archdiocese of Dubuque. The church is located in Dubuque, Iowa, United States, at the corner of 15th and White Streets. The church is recognizable by its steeple– one of the tallest in the area. The church property was added to the National Register of Historic Places as an historic district in 2015, and the various buildings were included as contributing properties in the Washington Residential Historic District later in the same year.

== History ==
=== The beginning ===
During the 1840s, a number of German families moved to the city of Dubuque. Many of these families were Catholic. Initially, they attended Mass at St. Raphael's Cathedral. However, the cathedral was becoming quite crowded due to the growing German and Irish populations of the city. Also, Bishop Mathias Loras was having difficulty ensuring that the German families were adequately cared for.

In 1849, Bishop Loras granted permission for 40 German families to form a new parish. Gerhard Hueckels donated land at the corner of 8th and White Streets in Dubuque. In 1850, a church was built on the land. This church, named Holy Trinity, was built of native stone with a tower about twenty feet tall.

For the first few years, there was a lack of priests in the still-young diocese. The people of Holy Trinity parish were served at first by a missionary, Father Gerhard Plathe. Finally, in 1853, they were given a resident priest, Father William Edmonds.

Soon the first major influx of German immigrants occurred. The small Holy Trinity church was filled to capacity. In 1863, the pastor, Father George Fendrick, and members of the parish founded the "German Roman Catholic Association of Dubuque." Their goal was to build a new church to support the parish - which now had over 300 families. At first, they attempted to purchase the Presbyterian Seminary in Dubuque for $15,000. After other Christian denominations opposed this plan, the group instead purchased an orchard for $3,000. This site, about seven blocks north of the Holy Trinity Church, is the site of the current church.

=== Construction of the new St. Mary's Church ===
In 1864, construction was begun on the new church. The plans were designed by the architect John Mullany, who had designed the present Cathedral building. Father Aloysius Meis directed the construction. The new building was done in Gothic Architecture style.

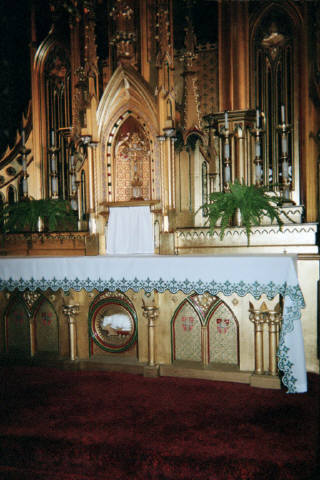
The original high altar

As with many other churches during the 19th century, most of the excavation and construction work was done by the men of the parish. By the time the foundation was complete in September 1864, only $3.03 was left in the treasury. The remaining $80,000 needed to finish the church was brought in through more fundraising and additional donations.

=== From 1867 to 1922 ===
On February 10, 1867, Bishop John Hennessy dedicated the new St. Mary's Church. Over the next 55 years, the population of Dubuque continued to grow. This was especially true in the 1880s with the arrival of the Milwaukee Railroad shops. St. Mary's was the mother parish of four other area parishes. Sacred Heart was established in 1879, followed by Holy Ghost in 1896. In 1910, a new Holy Trinity Church was built near Eagle Point Park in Dubuque in memory of the first church in Dubuque to carry that name. Finally in 1922, Nativity parish was built near what today is called Loras College.

In the early 1870s, the Hook and Hastings Company - a prominent 19th century organ builder - installed an organ in the choir loft. This organ was placed in a visually impressive case. The organ was significantly altered by the Lima Pipe Organ Company of Elida, Ohio, in 1965; the case and most of the pipes were retained, augmented by all new mechanism (including windchests constructed of aluminum) and several additional ranks of pipes. It currently has three manuals and 33 stops.

The sanctuary was extended in 1911, followed by the construction of two small chapels at the rear of the church. In 1914, stained glass windows built in Bavaria were installed in the church, though the shipment of the windows was nearly stopped because of the outbreak of World War I. Twelve large stained glass windows honor the Blessed Virgin Mary, and a large mural of the Assumption of the Blessed Virgin Mary was painted behind the altar, because the Assumption of the Blessed Virgin Mary is the patroness saint of the parish.

=== From 1922 to the present ===
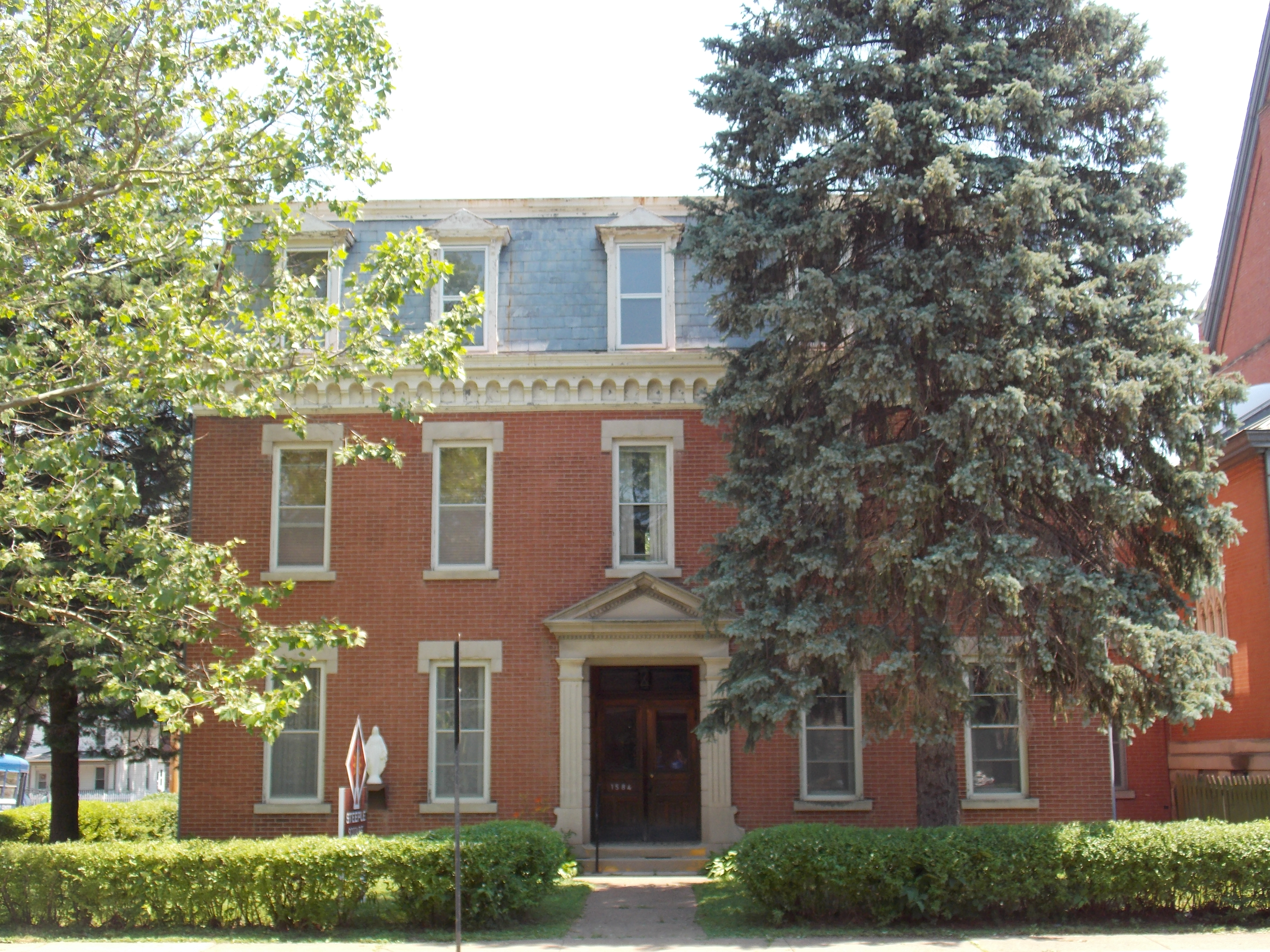
St. Mary's Rectory

In 1935, Father Aloysius Schmitt was ordained in Rome, Italy. He returned to the United States, and his first assignment was as an associate at Saint Mary's Church. In 1941, he was killed in the attack at Pearl Harbor, becoming the first American chaplain of any faith to die in the Second World War.

In the early 1970s, the reforms of the Second Vatican Council were implemented. The parish removed the communion rail and placed a new altar in the sanctuary that faced the congregation. However, the original high and side altars were left largely intact.

In recent years, St. Mary's Church had combined efforts with the nearby St. Patrick's Church. The two parishes shared administrative staff and school facilities. The parish has been affected by the Priest shortage and a decline in membership as some families moved to suburban locations. The parish had a priest to lead Mass, but most of the administrative work was handled by a lay woman minister, the wife of a former U.S. Representative who is a deacon.

In the 1990s, St. Mary's built a new handicapped entrance. This entrance is located at the northeast corner of the church and has an elevator. Before that, the church was not as accessible as other churches in the area.

With a heavy debt load and a declining membership, the parish council recommended to the Archdiocese that the parish be closed. In late 2009 it was announced that the parish would be closed. On May 25, 2010, St. Mary's held its final mass as a Catholic parish with 700 attendees. The building is still considered a church, but the parish is no longer active.

The movie F.I.S.T., which was largely filmed in Dubuque, had a scene which featured exterior shots of St. Mary's Church.

A book entitled "St. Marys: Finest church west of the Mississippi" covering the complete history of the church was published in August 2010. In 2014 a conceptual plan (but no timeline or cost estimate) to renovate the campus to provide office space for small businesses, a community kitchen and 12 units of low income housing was jointly announced by the Dubuque Archdiocese, non-Catholic community groups such as Dubuque's Economic Development Department and the Washington Neighborhood Corporation, and Dubuque-based Gronen Restoration.

== Schools ==
St. Mary's School merged with St. Patrick's Catholic School to form Downtown Catholic School in 1982. The organization Holy Family Catholic Schools took control of Downtown Catholic and other Dubuque-area Catholic schools in 2001. Downtown Catholic and Sacred Heart – Holy Trinity School became St. Francis School in 2002, and St. Francis closed in 2004. Four Oaks Family and Children Services bought the school building in 2006.
