= Wahlert Catholic High School =

Private secondary school in Dubuque, Iowa, United States

Location
- 2005 Kane Street; Dubuque, Iowa 52001-0538; United States; 42°31′8″N 90°42′17″W

Information
- Type: Private, Coeducational
- Religious affiliation: Roman Catholic
- Established: 1959
- School district: Holy Family Catholic Schools
- Oversight: Archdiocese of Dubuque
- Principal: Daniel Thole
- Grades: 9–12
- Campus: Suburban
- Colors: Royal blue, Gold and White
- Athletics conference: Mississippi Valley Conference
- Team name: Golden Eagles
- Newspaper: The Gleaner
- Yearbook: Harvest
- Website: School webpage

Wahlert Catholic High School is a private Roman Catholic high school in Dubuque, Iowa, United States, in the Roman Catholic Archdiocese of Dubuque.

== History ==
During a meeting on June 17, 1955, Archbishop Leo Binz and the pastors of the Dubuque Catholic parishes came to the conclusion that new high school facilities were needed to replace the existing high schools; Loras and St. Columbkille. These facilities were deteriorating, and also would not meet the demands of the post-World War II baby boom. As a result, it was decided to build a new central high school. In July, another meeting was held to determine a location for the new school. Harry Wahlert, who owned the Dubuque Packing Company, donated $250,000 towards the construction of the school. Area parishes were also asked to contribute to the funding. The total cost of construction was approximately $3,250,000.

A parcel across from the intersection of Kane and Chaney Streets near the west end of Dubuque was selected as the site for the school. When construction was finished, it measured over 222,000 square feet (20,600 m^{2}). In February 1959, the archdiocese announced that the new school would be named in honor of Harry Wahlert. In August the school was officially opened, and the first classes began in September. In 2005, construction commenced on the Mazzuchelli expansion, which utilized the west wing of Wahlert and a new addition next to the school. This facility opened in 2006, and now serves as the central middle school for all Dubuque residents in the Holy Family Catholic Schools.

== Campus ==
Wahlert Catholic High School is located at 2005 Kane Street in Dubuque, Iowa. The campus is 50 acres (200,000 m^{2}) in size, with its main entrance near the corner of Kane Street and Chaney Road. The three-story building and its grounds accommodate a chapel, running track, tennis courts, soccer field, and baseball field. The Wahlert portion of the campus occupies the eastern wings of the main building, while Mazzuchelli Middle School occupies the far western wing.

The main gymnasium was renovated in early 2013.

== Athletics ==
Wahlert High School offers opportunities for participation in 19 interscholastic athletic activities. Many of these sports include freshman, sophomore, and junior varsity levels of competition. Sports currently offered to boys include football, cross country, basketball, wrestling, bowling, golf, tennis, track, soccer, baseball, and swimming (co-op with Dubuque Community Schools). Sports offered to girls include cross country, swimming, volleyball, basketball, bowling, golf, tennis, soccer, and softball. Wahlert's varsity athletic teams compete in the Mississippi Valley Conference.

- The girls' volleyball team has won 19 state championships (1974, 1976, 1977, 1978, 1986, 1987, 1990, 1991, 1992, 1995, 1996, 2000, 2001, 2002, 2003, 2004, 2005, 2016, 2017).
- The girls' cross country program won the 3A state title in 1981, 2009, 2010 and 2011
- The boys' cross country team won the 3A state title 2003, 2004 and 2010.
- Girls' golf 6-time State Champions (1966, 1969, 1971, 1972, 1973, 1974)
- Girls' soccer has won four state titles (1999, 2000, 2002, 2005)
- Boys’s soccer won state championships in 2008 and 2012.
- Girls' track and field teams were state champions in 2011 and 2012.
- Boys' track and field was state champion in 2006.
- Boys' tennis - 10-time Class 1A state champions. The longest run of titles in state history (6 years): 2004 through 2009, in addition to wins in 1989, 2011, 2016, 2018, and 2024.
- Girls' tennis were state champions in 1983, 1991, and 2009.
- Boys' bowling won 1A state titles in 2010 and 2013.
- Girls' bowling were state champions in 2011 and 2013.
- Boys' basketball 5-time Class 3A State Champions (1980, 1981, 2008, 2014, 2015)
- Football 3A State Champions 2024
- Co-op Boys' Swimming (Hempstead/Wahlert) State Champions 2025
- Softball State 3A Champions 2026

== Performing arts ==
Wahlert has two competitive show choirs: "Impulse" (varsity) and "Impact" (prep). The school also hosts its own competition, dubbed the "Key City Classic".

== Notable alumni ==
- Kayla Banwarth - volleyball player
- Bill Burbach - professional baseball player
- Pam Jochum - politician
- Kevin Kunnert - NBA basketball player
- Mac May - Volleyball player
- Riley McCarron - NFL player
- Michael Joseph Melloy - judge
- Kate Mulgrew - actress
- Bill Reiter - CBS Sports radio host
- Travis Tranel - legislator

== See also ==
- List of high schools in Iowa
