= Iowa Highway 188 =

State highway in Iowa, United States

Iowa Highway 188
- Iowa 188 highlighted in red

Route information
- Maintained by Iowa DOT
- Length: 24.231 mi (38.996 km)
- Existed: 1945–present

Major junctions
- South end: Iowa 3 near Clarksville
- East end: US 63 near Tripoli

Location
- Country: United States
- State: Iowa
- Counties: Butler; Bremer

Highway system
- Iowa Primary Highway System; Interstate; US; State; Secondary; Scenic
← Iowa 187	→ Iowa 191

Iowa Highway 188 (Iowa 188) is a state highway in north-central Iowa. The route is signed both north–south and east–west because of a 90-degree corner near the route's midpoint. The route begins at Iowa Highway 3 south of Clarksville and ends at U.S. Highway 63 near Tripoli.

== Route description ==
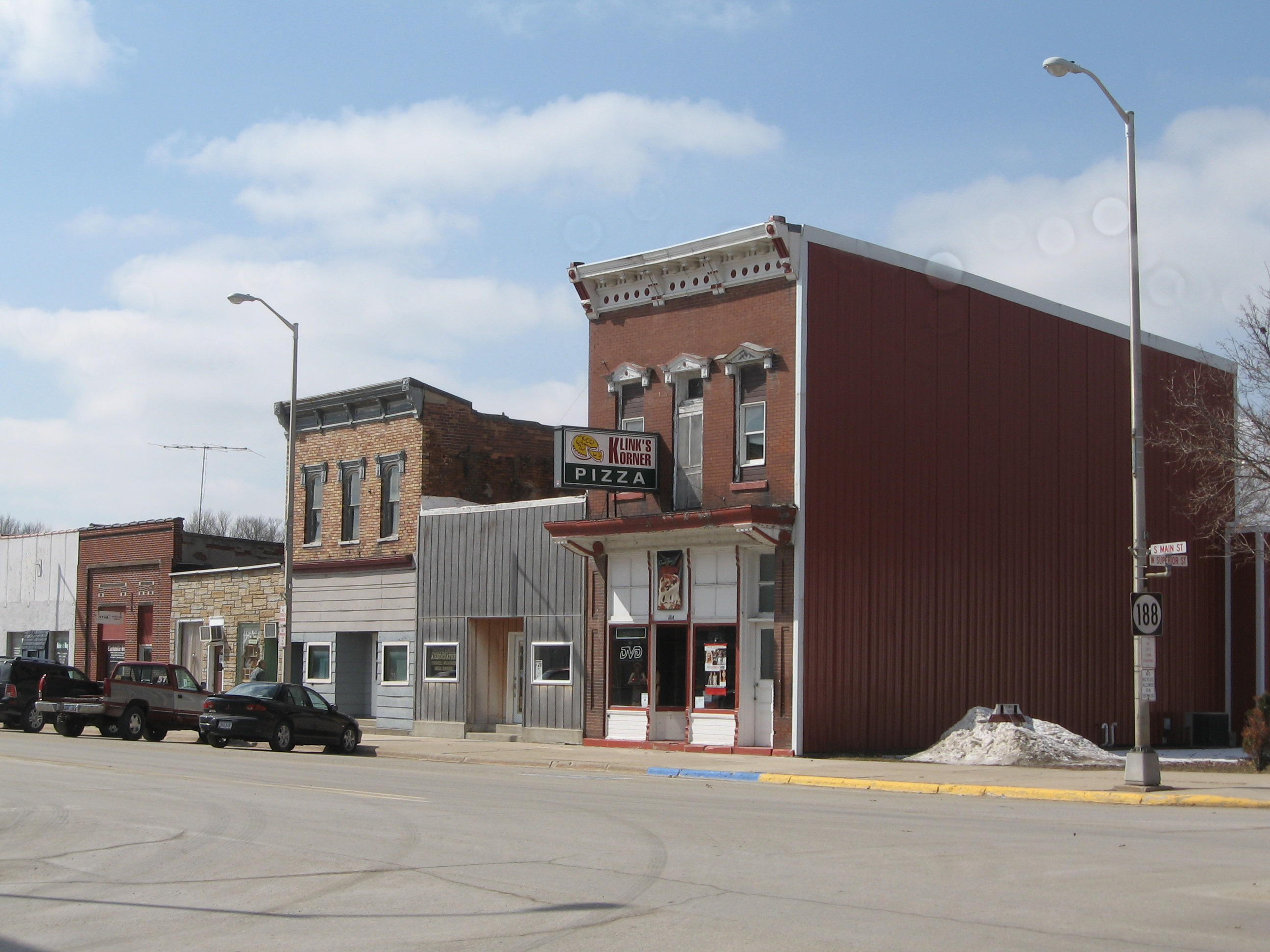
Iowa 188 passes through Clarksville's business district.

Iowa Highway 188 begins at a T intersection with Iowa Highway 3 2 1/2 miles (4.0 km) south of Clarksville. From Iowa 3, Iowa 188 heads north where it crosses the Shell Rock River and forms the eastern boundary of Heery Woods State Park. It passes through Clarksville and continues north for 4 miles (6.4 km). At four-way intersection with Butler County Road T64 and a gravel road, Iowa 188 turns to the east and becomes an east–west road for the remainder of its journey.

Iowa 188 heads east for 6 miles (9.7 km) where it crosses into Bremer County one mile (1.6 km) west of Plainfield. One half-mile (0.8 km) into Bremer County, is a diamond interchange with U.S. Route 218 and Iowa Highway 27, the Avenue of the Saints highway. In Plainfield, Iowa 188 crosses over the Cedar River. It continues due east for 10 miles (16 km), ending at U.S. Highway 63 north of Tripoli.

== History ==
Iowa 188 was designated in 1945 as a 10-mile-long (16 km) route which connected US 218 at Plainfield to US 63. It first appeared on the state highway map in 1946. Four years later, the highway absorbed Iowa 53, which connected Clarksville to Iowa 10. Until 1963, the highway appeared very much like it does today. That year the section of highway between Clarksville and Plainfield was turned over to Butler County officials and the section south of Clarksville became Iowa 122. Just three years later, the Iowa State Highway Commission changed course and reabsorbed Iowa 122. Since then the routing has not changed.

== Major intersections ==
County	Location	mi	km	Destinations	Notes
Butler	Jackson Township	0.000	0.000	Iowa 3	
Butler	Fremont Township	7.200	11.587	CR T64	Iowa 188 becomes an east–west route
Bremer	Plainfield	13.711	22.066	US 218 / Iowa 27	
Bremer	Douglas Township	24.231	38.996	US 63	
1.000 mi = 1.609 km; 1.000 km = 0.621 mi
