= Pittsford Township =

Pittsford Township may refer to the following places in the United States:

- Pittsford Township, Butler County, Iowa
- Pittsford Township, Michigan

== See also ==
- Pittsford (disambiguation)
