= Butler Township, Butler County, Iowa =

Township in Iowa, US

Butler Township, Butler County
- Township
- Coordinates: 42°46′28″N 092°36′48″W
- Country: United States
- State: Iowa
- County: Butler

Area
  - Total: 36.55 sq mi (94.66 km^{2})
  - Land: 36.4 sq mi (94.2 km^{2})
  - Water: 0.18 sq mi (0.46 km^{2})
- Elevation: 971 ft (296 m)

Population (2020)
  - Total: 1,567
  - Density: 43/sq mi (16.6/km^{2})
- FIPS code: 19-90420
- GNIS feature ID: 0467513

Butler Township is one of sixteen townships in Butler County, Iowa, United States. As of the 2020 census, its population was 1,567.

== Geography ==
Butler Township covers an area of 36.55 square miles (94.7 km^{2}) and contains one incorporated settlement, Clarksville. According to the USGS, it contains four cemeteries: Antioch, Lowell, Old and Old Town.
