= Bennezette Township, Butler County, Iowa =

Township in Iowa, US

Bennezette Township, Butler County
- Township
- Coordinates: 42°51′46″N 092°57′52″W
- Country: United States
- State: Iowa
- County: Butler

Area
  - Total: 36.9 sq mi (95.5 km^{2})
  - Land: 36.9 sq mi (95.5 km^{2})
  - Water: 0 sq mi (0 km^{2})
- Elevation: 1,050 ft (320 m)

Population (2020)
  - Total: 224
  - Density: 6.0/sq mi (2.3/km^{2})
- FIPS code: 19-90195
- GNIS feature ID: 0467438

Bennezette Township is one of sixteen townships in Butler County, Iowa, United States. As of the 2020 census, its population was 224.

== Geography ==
Bennezette Township covers an area of 36.87 square miles (95.5 km^{2}) and contains one incorporated settlement, Aredale.
