= North Butler Community School District =

Public school district in Allison, Iowa, United States

Coordinates: 42.754816°N 92.800883°W

Location
- Allison, Iowa Butler and Floyd counties United States
- Coordinates: 42.754816, -92.800883

District information
- Type: Local school district
- Grades: K–12
- Established: 2011
- Superintendent: Joel Foster
- Schools: 2
- Budget: $9,623,000 (2020-21)
- NCES District ID: 1903450

Students and staff
- Students: 567 (2022-23)
- Teachers: 49.47 FTE
- Staff: 46.62 FTE
- Student–teacher ratio: 11.46
- Athletic conference: Top of Iowa
- District mascot: Bearcats
- Colors: Navy and Maize

Other information
- Website: www.northbutler.org

North Butler Community School District, also referred to as North Butler Schools, is a rural public school district headquartered in Allison, Iowa. The district occupies parts of Butler and Floyd counties, and it serves Greene, Allison, and Bristow.

== History ==
It was established on July 1, 2011, as a merger of the Greene Community School District and Allison–Bristow Community School District.

== Schools ==
It has two schools:

- North Butler Elementary School (PK–6) in Alison
- North Butler High School (7–12) in Greene

== See also ==
- List of school districts in Iowa
