= Butler County Courthouse =

Butler County Courthouse may refer to:

- Butler County Courthouse (Iowa), Allison, Iowa
- Butler County Courthouse (Kansas), El Dorado, Kansas
- Butler County Courthouse (Missouri), Poplar Bluff, Missouri
- Butler County Courthouse (Ohio), Hamilton, Ohio
- Butler County Courthouse (Pennsylvania), Butler, Pennsylvania
