= Clarksville High School (Iowa) =

Public secondary school in Clarksville, Iowa, United States

Clarksville Jr/Sr High School

Location
- 319 N Mather Street; Clarksville, Iowa 50619; United States
- 42.787104°N 92.666066°W

Information
- Type: Public
- School district: Clarksville Community School District
- Superintendent: Bryan Boysen
- Principal: Tony Jones
- Teaching staff: 11.99 (FTE)
- Grades: 7-12
- Enrollment: 125 (2024-2025)
- Campus: Rural
- Colors: Maroon and Gold
- Athletics conference: Iowa Star Conference
- Mascot: Indian
- Website: www.clarksville.k12.ia.us

Clarksville High School is a rural public high school in Clarksville, Iowa, and is part of the Clarksville Community School District.

== Athletics ==
The athletic extracurricular activities at Clarksville High School are cross country, football, volleyball, basketball, wrestling, golf, track and field, softball, baseball, and cheerleading. The Indians are classified as a 1A school, and compete in the Iowa Star Conference.

=== State championships ===
- 1991 Class 1A Wrestling State Champions
- 2020 Class 1A Softball State Champions
- 2025 Class 1A Softball State Champions
- 2026 Class 1A Softball State Champions

== See also ==
- List of high schools in Iowa
