= Clarksville Community School District =

Public school district in Clarksville, Iowa, United States

Coordinates: 42.787066°N 92.665976°W

Location
- Clarksville, Iowa Butler County United States
- Coordinates: 42.787066, -92.665976

District information
- Type: Local school district
- Grades: K-12
- Superintendent: Mark Olmstead
- Schools: 2
- Budget: $4,857,000 (2020-21)
- NCES District ID: 1907440

Students and staff
- Students: 311 (2022-23)
- Teachers: 27.17 FTE
- Staff: 25.41 FTE
- Student–teacher ratio: 11.45
- Athletic conference: Iowa Star
- District mascot: Indians
- Colors: Maroon and White

Other information
- Website: www.clarksville.k12.ia.us

== Administration ==
Like many rural school districts in Iowa, Clarksville utilizes sharing agreements to optimize administrative resources. In February 2024, the Clarksville school board and the neighboring North Butler Community School District agreed to share a superintendent. Bryan Boysen was appointed to lead both districts, effective July 1, 2024.

The Clarksville Community School District, is a public school district in Clarksville, Iowa. The district serves Clarksville and surrounding areas in northern Butler County.

The school, which serves all grade levels PreK-12 in one building, is located at 318 N. Mather Street in Clarksville.

The school's mascot is the Indians. Their colors are maroon and white.

== Schools ==
- Clarksville Elementary School
- Clarksville High School

The Indians compete in the Iowa Star Conference.

== See also ==
- List of school districts in Iowa
