= West Point Township, Butler County, Iowa =

Township in Iowa, US

West Point Township, Butler County
- Township
- Coordinates: 42°46′16″N 092°50′57″W
- Country: United States
- State: Iowa
- County: Butler

Area
  - Total: 36.11 sq mi (93.53 km^{2})
  - Land: 36.11 sq mi (93.53 km^{2})
  - Water: 0 sq mi (0 km^{2})
- Elevation: 1,007 ft (307 m)

Population (2020)
  - Total: 1,330
  - Density: 37/sq mi (14.2/km^{2})
- FIPS code: 19-94692
- GNIS feature ID: 0468985

West Point Township is one of sixteen townships in Butler County, Iowa, United States. As of the 2020 census, its population was 1,330.

== Geography ==
West Point Township covers an area of 36.11 square miles (93.5 km^{2}) and contains two incorporated settlements: Allison and Bristow. According to the USGS, it contains one cemetery, Jungling.
