= West Point Township =

West Point Township may refer to the following townships in the United States:

- West Point Township, Illinois
- West Point Township, White County, Indiana
- West Point Township, Butler County, Iowa
- West Point Township, Lee County, Iowa
- West Point Township, Bates County, Missouri

And one in Liberia:

- West Point, Monrovia
