= Pittsford =

Pittsford may refer to:

Places in the United States

- Pittsford Township, Michigan
  - Pittsford, Michigan
- Pittsford, New York, a town
  - Pittsford (village), New York
- Pittsford, Vermont, a New England town
  - Pittsford (CDP), Vermont, the main village in the town
- Pittsford Township, Butler County, Iowa
