= Ripley Township, Butler County, Iowa =

Township in Iowa, US

Ripley Township, Butler County
- Township
- Coordinates: 42°41′34″N 092°51′00″W
- Country: United States
- State: Iowa
- County: Butler

Area
  - Total: 36.13 sq mi (93.58 km^{2})
  - Land: 36.07 sq mi (93.41 km^{2})
  - Water: 0.066 sq mi (0.17 km^{2})
- Elevation: 945 ft (288 m)

Population (2020)
  - Total: 217
  - Density: 6.0/sq mi (2.3/km^{2})
- FIPS code: 19-93633
- GNIS feature ID: 0468619

Ripley Township is one of sixteen townships in Butler County, Iowa, United States. As of the 2020 census, its population was 217.

== Geography ==
Ripley Township covers an area of 36.13 square miles (93.6 km^{2}) and contains no incorporated settlements. According to the USGS, it contains one cemetery, Hitesville.
