= Eleanor, Iowa =

- Unincorporated community
- Location within Iowa
- Coordinates: 42°36′51″N 92°50′58″W
- Country: United States
- State: Iowa
- County: Butler
- Elevation: 968 ft (295 m)
- Time zone: UTC-6 (Central (CST))
  - Summer (DST): UTC-5 (CDT)
- Area code: 319
- GNIS feature ID: 464533

Eleanor is an unincorporated community in Butler County, in the U.S. state of Iowa.

== History ==
A post office called Eleanor was in operation from 1901 until 1903. The community was named for Mrs. Eleanor McDonald. Eleanor's population was just 12 in 1925. The population was 10 in 1940.
