= Madison Township, Butler County, Iowa =

Township in Iowa, US

Madison Township, Butler County
- Township
- Coordinates: 42°41′13″N 092°58′03″W
- Country: United States
- State: Iowa
- County: Butler

Area
  - Total: 36.41 sq mi (94.29 km^{2})
  - Land: 36.37 sq mi (94.21 km^{2})
  - Water: 0.031 sq mi (0.08 km^{2})
- Elevation: 1,020 ft (310 m)

Population (2020)
  - Total: 282
  - Density: 7.8/sq mi (3/km^{2})
- FIPS code: 19-92754
- GNIS feature ID: 0468318

Madison Township is one of sixteen townships in Butler County, Iowa, United States. As of the 2020 census, its population was 282.

== Geography ==
Madison Township covers an area of 36.41 square miles (94.3 km^{2}) and contains no incorporated settlements. According to the USGS, it contains one cemetery, Madison.
