= Beaver Township, Butler County, Iowa =

Township in Iowa, US

Beaver Township, Butler County
- Township
- Coordinates: 42°36′19″N 092°36′13″W
- Country: United States
- State: Iowa
- County: Butler

Area
  - Total: 36.35 sq mi (94.14 km^{2})
  - Land: 36.34 sq mi (94.11 km^{2})
  - Water: 0.012 sq mi (0.03 km^{2})
- Elevation: 899 ft (274 m)

Population (2020)
  - Total: 1,323
  - Density: 37/sq mi (14.1/km^{2})
- FIPS code: 19-90153
- GNIS feature ID: 0467423

Beaver Township is one of sixteen townships in Butler County, Iowa, United States. As of the 2020 census, its population was 1,323.

== Geography ==
Beaver Township covers an area of 36.35 square miles (94.1 km^{2}) and contains one incorporated settlement, New Hartford. According to the USGS, it contains three cemeteries: Behrends, Bidwell and Oak Hill.
