= Jefferson Township, Butler County, Iowa =

Township in Iowa, US

Jefferson Township, Butler County
- Township
- Coordinates: 42°41′02″N 092°43′40″W
- Country: United States
- State: Iowa
- County: Butler

Area
  - Total: 36.20 sq mi (93.75 km^{2})
  - Land: 36.20 sq mi (93.75 km^{2})
  - Water: 0 sq mi (0 km^{2})
- Elevation: 950 ft (290 m)

Population (2020)
  - Total: 285
  - Density: 7.8/sq mi (3/km^{2})
- FIPS code: 19-92211
- GNIS feature ID: 0468131

Jefferson Township is one of sixteen townships in Butler County, Iowa, United States. As of the 2020 census, its population was 285.

== History ==
The first white child was born in Jefferson Township in 1855.

== Geography ==
Jefferson Township covers an area of 36.2 square miles (94 km^{2}) and contains no incorporated settlements. According to the USGS, it contains three cemeteries: Butler Center, Coster and New Albion.
