= Butler County Courthouse (Iowa) =

Coordinates: 42°45′21.861″N 92°47′42.566″W

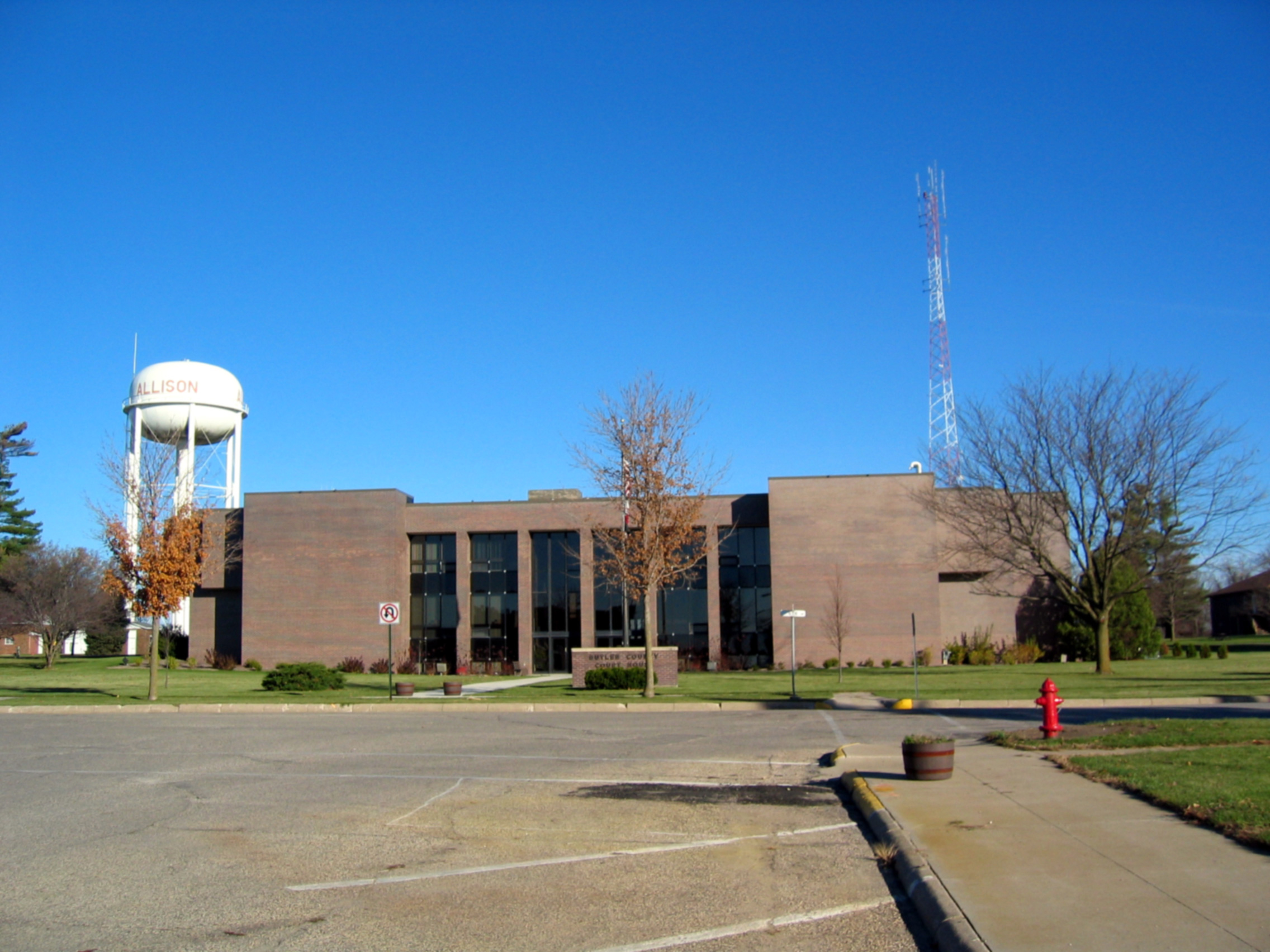
- Butler County Courthouse

- Location within Iowa

General information
- Architectural style: Modern
- Location: 428 Sixth Street; Allison, Iowa
- Completed: 1975
- Governing body: Local

Design and construction
- Architects: Cervetti-Weber & Associates, Inc.

The Butler County Courthouse is located at 428 Sixth Street in Allison, Iowa, United States. It opened in 1975 and replaced a structure originally measuring 50 by 55 feet (15 m × 17 m) completed in 1881 when the county seat relocated from Clarksville to Allison. The 1881 courthouse was enlarged in 1903 and again in 1937.

Beginning in the 1950s, county officials realized the need for a new building and requested funding through ballot proposals in 1956, 1957, and 1970. Voters rejected these proposals forcing officials to cancel court hearings and other functions due to insufficient heat and overloaded electrical wiring and rent space in other buildings.

Their fourth request for funding in 1973 was successful and officials received 13 bids to construct a new courthouse. They selected the Marshalltown, Iowa firm of Cervetti-Weber & Associates, Inc. at a cost of $48,878.84. The new courthouse would be constructed on the grassy area immediately south of the 1881 building. Groundbreaking was April 14, 1974, and officials dedicated the new facility December 14, 1975. The building was completed for about $940,000.

The new building is faced with brown brick and houses all county offices except for the sheriff, who maintains offices in the adjacent jail. The former courthouse was demolished in April 1976.
