= Sinclair, Iowa =

Sinclair
- Unincorporated community
- Sinclair, Iowa
- Location within the state of Iowa
- Coordinates: 42°30′0″N 92°43′55″W
- Country: United States
- State: Iowa
- County: Butler
- Elevation: 1,014 ft (309 m)

Population (2000)
  - Total: 12
- Time zone: UTC-6 (Central (CST))
  - Summer (DST): UTC-5 (CDT)
- GNIS feature ID: 464746

Sinclair is an unincorporated community in Butler County, Iowa, United States.

== History ==
Sinclair was a frequent stop for the Underground Railroad during and before the Civil War. Prior to the establishment of the town, it was nothing more than a railroad stop. Throughout its history, the town has had periods of expansion and periods of struggle. During the Great Depression, the town of Sinclair and the small population suffered greatly. Sinclair's population was 12 in 1925. The population was also 12 in 1940.

On May 25, 2008, an EF5 tornado ripped through southern Butler County, and destroyed the Sinclair grain elevator, ripping apart grain bins and throwing anhydrous ammonia tanks into fields.
