= Albion Township, Butler County, Iowa =

Township in Iowa, US

Albion Township, Butler County
- Township
- Coordinates: 42°35′32″N 092°43′36″W
- Country: United States
- State: Iowa
- County: Butler

Area
  - Total: 35.94 sq mi (93.09 km^{2})
  - Land: 35.94 sq mi (93.09 km^{2})
  - Water: 0 sq mi (0 km^{2})
- Elevation: 932 ft (284 m)

Population (2020)
  - Total: 2,180
  - Density: 61/sq mi (23.4/km^{2})
- FIPS code: 19-90030
- GNIS feature ID: 0467381

Albion Township is one of sixteen townships in Butler County, Iowa, United States. As of the 2020 census, its population was 2,180.

== Geography ==
Albion Township covers an area of 35.94 square miles (93.1 km^{2}) and contains one incorporated settlement, Parkersburg. According to the USGS, it contains three cemeteries: Codner, Parker Burial Grounds and Saint Clair Gravel.
