= Greene, Iowa =

- City
- Location of Greene, Iowa
- Coordinates: 42°53′48″N 92°48′15″W
- Country: United States
- State: Iowa
- Counties: Butler, Floyd

Area
  - Total: 1.21 sq mi (3.13 km^{2})
  - Land: 1.14 sq mi (2.96 km^{2})
  - Water: 0.069 sq mi (0.18 km^{2})
- Elevation: 955 ft (291 m)

Population (2020)
  - Total: 990
  - Density: 867.4/sq mi (334.89/km^{2})
- Time zone: UTC-6 (Central (CST))
  - Summer (DST): UTC-5 (CDT)
- ZIP code: 50636
- Area code: 641
- FIPS code: 19-32745
- GNIS feature ID: 2394984
- Website: greeneia.org

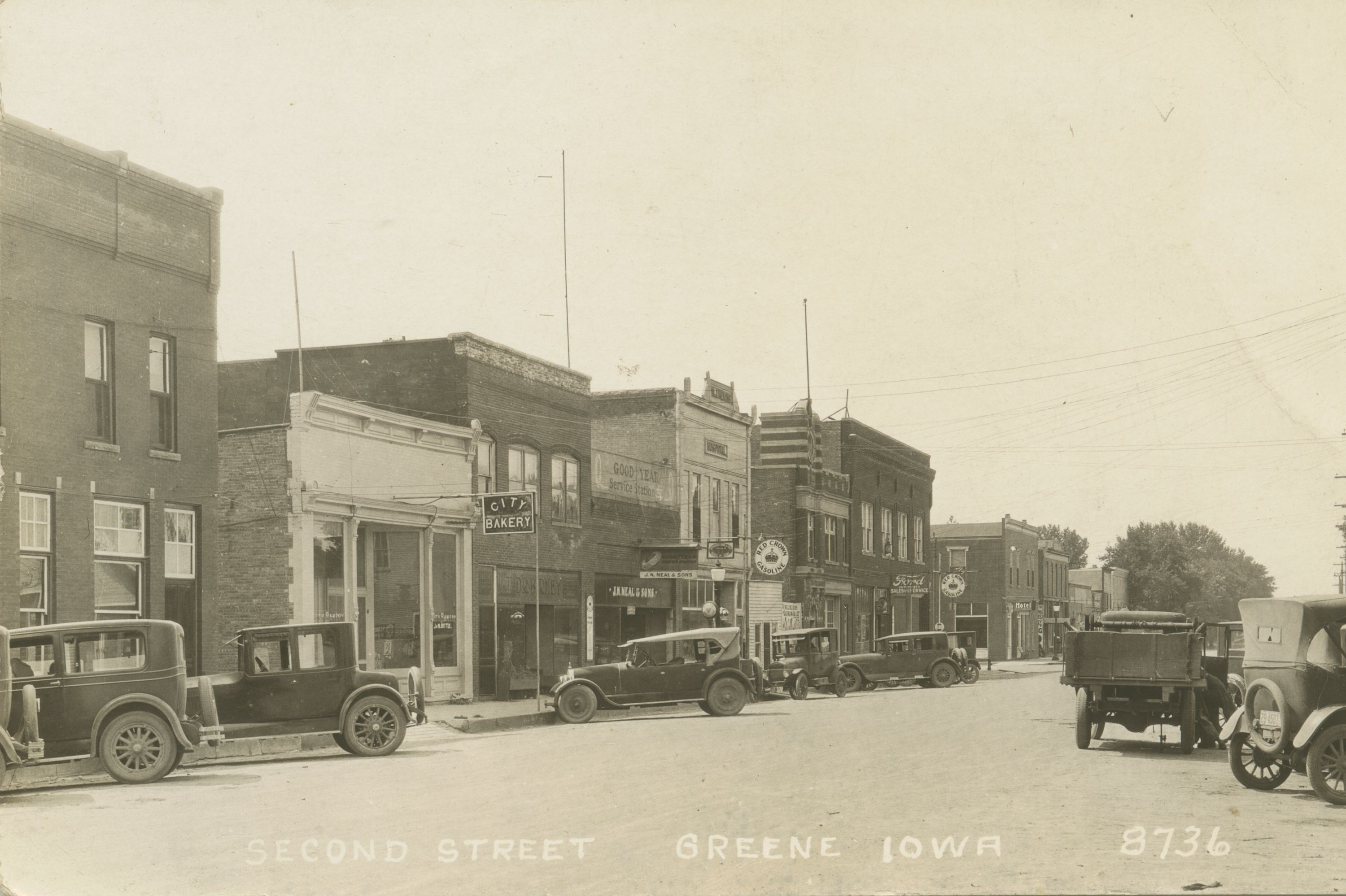
Main Street, Greene, Iowa, 1915

Greene is a city in Butler County, Iowa, United States, along the Shell Rock River, and along Butler County's northern border, where Butler and Floyd counties meet. The population was 990 at the time of the 2020 census.

== History ==
The community of Greene was first a postal area called, "Elm Springs" that was established in 1855 three miles southwest of the current town on Coldwater Creek. In 1871, the railroad selected a site on the east side of the Shell Rock River for a train depot and roundhouse, drawing the Elm Springs Post Office and community to that site. In 1871, the postal area name was changed from Elm Springs to Greene in honor of Judge George Greene, president of the Burlington, Cedar Rapids and Minnesota railroad who, along with J. W. Traer and others, purchased the land for the new community. Judge Greene gave generously of land and money for the new town. In 1879, the Greene postal area was incorporated as The Town of Greene.

== Geography ==
The city is located along the northern edge of Butler County, with a small portion extending north into Floyd County. According to the United States Census Bureau, the city has a total area of 1.22 square miles (3.16 km^{2}), of which 1.14 square miles (2.95 km^{2}) is land and 0.08 square miles (0.21 km^{2}) is water.

The Shell Rock River bisects the town, with the state Highway 14 and County Road 13 bridges connecting the two sections.

== Demographics ==
Historical populations
Year	Pop.	±%
1880	711	—
1890	845	+18.8%
1900	1,192	+41.1%
1910	1,150	−3.5%
1920	1,375	+19.6%
1930	1,268	−7.8%
1940	1,303	+2.8%
1950	1,347	+3.4%
1960	1,427	+5.9%
1970	1,363	−4.5%
1980	1,332	−2.3%
1990	1,142	−14.3%
2000	1,099	−3.8%
2010	1,130	+2.8%
2020	990	−12.4%
Source:"U.S. Census website". United States Census Bureau. and Iowa Data Center; Source: U.S. Decennial Census

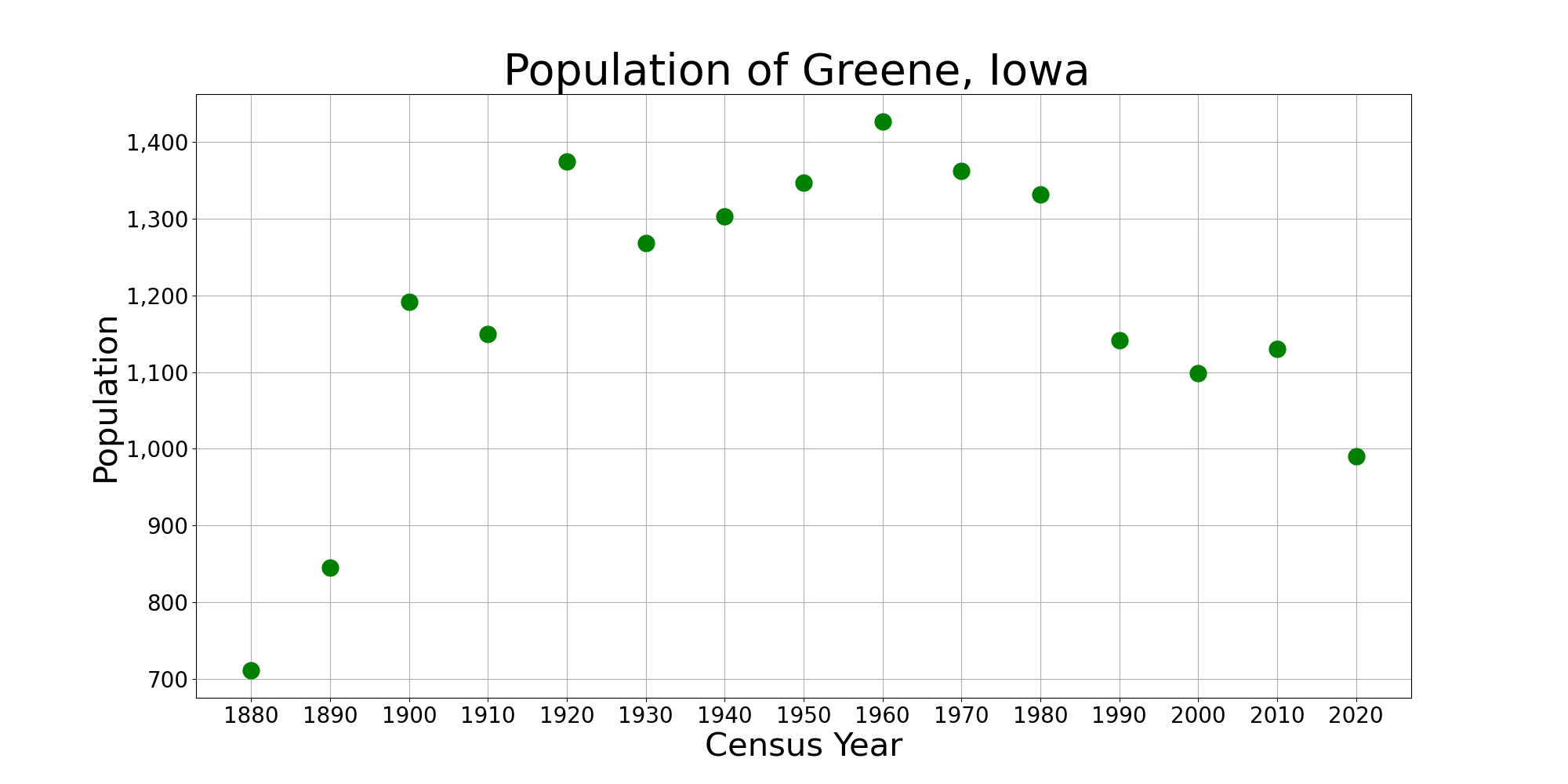
The population of Greene, Iowa from US census data

=== 2020 census ===
As of the census of 2020, there were 990 people, 459 households, and 281 families residing in the city. The population density was 867.4 inhabitants per square mile (334.9/km^{2}). There were 543 housing units at an average density of 475.7 per square mile (183.7/km^{2}). The racial makeup of the city was 98.0% White, 0.0% Black or African American, 0.3% Native American, 0.1% Asian, 0.0% Pacific Islander, 0.3% from other races and 1.3% from two or more races. Hispanic or Latino persons of any race comprised 0.6% of the population.

Of the 459 households, 24.4% of which had children under the age of 18 living with them, 47.3% were married couples living together, 4.4% were cohabitating couples, 32.2% had a female householder with no spouse or partner present and 16.1% had a male householder with no spouse or partner present. 38.8% of all households were non-families. 36.4% of all households were made up of individuals, 17.2% had someone living alone who was 65 years old or older.

The median age in the city was 49.0 years. 23.2% of the residents were under the age of 20; 2.9% were between the ages of 20 and 24; 19.1% were from 25 and 44; 25.3% were from 45 and 64; and 29.5% were 65 years of age or older. The gender makeup of the city was 46.8% male and 53.2% female.

=== 2010 census ===
As of the census of 2010, there were 1,130 people, 510 households, and 320 families living in the city. The population density was 991.2 inhabitants per square mile (382.7/km^{2}). There were 575 housing units at an average density of 504.4 per square mile (194.7/km^{2}). The racial makeup of the city was 98.6% White, 0.2% African American, 0.2% Native American, 0.3% Asian, and 0.8% from two or more races. Hispanic or Latino of any race were 0.4% of the population.

There were 510 households, of which 22.2% had children under the age of 18 living with them, 53.9% were married couples living together, 6.3% had a female householder with no husband present, 2.5% had a male householder with no wife present, and 37.3% were non-families. 33.1% of all households were made up of individuals, and 19.6% had someone living alone who was 65 years of age or older. The average household size was 2.16 and the average family size was 2.72.

The median age in the city was 49.8 years. 19.4% of residents were under the age of 18; 5% were between the ages of 18 and 24; 20.1% were from 25 to 44; 26.8% were from 45 to 64; and 28.7% were 65 years of age or older. The gender makeup of the city was 47.4% male and 52.6% female.

=== 2000 census ===
As of the census of 2000, there were 1,099 people, 508 households, and 308 families living in the city. The population density was 1,003.7 inhabitants per square mile (387.5/km^{2}). There were 562 housing units at an average density of 513.3 per square mile (198.2/km^{2}). The racial makeup of the city was 99.36% White, 0.27% African American, 0.27% Asian, and 0.09% from two or more races. Hispanic or Latino of any race were 1.09% of the population.

There were 508 households, out of which 23.4% had children under the age of 18 living with them, 53.1% were married couples living together, 5.9% had a female householder with no husband present, and 39.2% were non-families. 36.8% of all households were made up of individuals, and 26.0% had someone living alone who was 65 years of age or older. The average household size was 2.13 and the average family size was 2.80.

In the city, the population was spread out, with 21.1% under the age of 18, 5.1% from 18 to 24, 21.7% from 25 to 44, 22.7% from 45 to 64, and 29.3% who were 65 years of age or older. The median age was 47 years. For every 100 females, there were 86.6 males. For every 100 females age 18 and over, there were 83.3 males.

The median income for a household in the city was $34,063, and the median income for a family was $44,643. Males had a median income of $31,406 versus $21,181 for females. The per capita income for the city was $17,891. About 4.3% of families and 5.8% of the population were below the poverty line, including 2.2% of those under age 18 and 13.1% of those age 65 or over.

== Education ==
It is a part of the North Butler Community School District, which was established on July 1, 2011, as a merger of the Greene Community School District and Allison–Bristow Community School District, The local high school is North Butler High School.

== Notable people ==
- Thomas Braden (1917–2009) author of the book Eight Is Enough that was the basis for the ABC show Eight Is Enough
- Henry Norman Graven (1893–1970) United States federal judge from 1944 to 1970
- Frank D. Jackson (1854–1938) 15th governor of Iowa from 1894 to 1896

== See also ==
- King Corn, a documentary released in October 2007 about corn and its effects on American food and agriculture industries.
- Iowa Highway 14
