= Monroe Township, Butler County, Iowa =

Township in Iowa, US

Monroe Township, Butler County
- Township
- Coordinates: 42°36′06″N 092°50′40″W
- Country: United States
- State: Iowa
- County: Butler

Area
  - Total: 35.86 sq mi (92.88 km^{2})
  - Land: 35.86 sq mi (92.88 km^{2})
  - Water: 0 sq mi (0 km^{2})
- Elevation: 950 ft (290 m)

Population (2020)
  - Total: 1,653
  - Density: 46/sq mi (17.8/km^{2})
- FIPS code: 19-92967
- GNIS feature ID: 0468392

Monroe Township is one of sixteen townships in Butler County, Iowa, USA. As of the 2020 census, its population was 1,653.

== Geography ==
Monroe Township covers an area of 35.86 square miles (92.88 km^{2}) and contains one incorporated settlement, Aplington. According to the USGS, it contains five cemeteries: Bethel Reform, Monroe Township, Oak Hill, Pleasant View and Saint Patricks Catholic.
