= Allison–Bristow Community School District =

Former school district in Iowa

Allison–Bristow Community School District was a school district headquartered in Allison, Iowa, serving Allison and Bristow.

It began whole grade-sharing with the Greene Community School District in 2004, leading to the creation of North Butler High School in Greene and North Butler Middle School in Allison. Leaderships of the two districts promoted a merger that would occur by 2006 as they hoped to obtain property tax incentives and weighted enrollment funds totaling $600,000. This election was scheduled for Tuesday, October 11, 2005. The proposed merger failed as Aliston–Bristow voters defeated it on a 279–206 basis, with 57.53% rejecting the proposed merger. The Greene voters had approved it on a 352–62 basis (85.02%).

The second vote on whether the districts would merge succeeded in 2010, with Greene voters approving it on a 607–25 basis (96%) and Allison–Bristow voters approving it on a 378–311 basis (54.86%). It merged with Greene CSD to form North Butler Community School District on July 1, 2011.
