= Aredale, Iowa =

- City
- Location of Aredale, Iowa
- Coordinates: 42°50′00″N 93°00′05″W
- Country: USA
- State: Iowa
- County: Butler

Area
  - Total: 1.00 sq mi (2.59 km^{2})
  - Land: 1.00 sq mi (2.59 km^{2})
  - Water: 0 sq mi (0.00 km^{2})
- Elevation: 1,024 ft (312 m)

Population (2020)
  - Total: 62
  - Density: 62/sq mi (23.9/km^{2})
- Time zone: UTC-6 (Central (CST))
  - Summer (DST): UTC-5 (CDT)
- ZIP code: 50605
- Area code: 641
- FIPS code: 19-02620
- GNIS feature ID: 2393980

Aredale is a city in Butler County, Iowa, United States. The population was 62 at the 2020 census.

== History ==
The town of Aredale owes its conception to cheese. The area surrounding the town had seen increasing settlement since the 1860s, and in 1890, the local dairy farmers pooled their resources to create a cheese making factory, which eventually helped the town develop enough to warrant the community its own post office and thus township rights.

The name Aredale is derived from a variation on the Pennsylvania town of Airville, from which several Aredale residents had emigrated. The plat was recorded on June 28, 1900, by the Iowa and Minnesota Town Site Company. June 28 later was observed as Field Day by residents, and featured a town celebration and a baseball game visited by hundreds of people from nearby towns.

Soon the town featured a number of competing lumberyards and stockyards, and the Aredale Savings and Loan was constructed in 1901. That same year, the First Methodist Church was organized, and purchased the Coldwater Methodist Church building, which was then moved in town. It was destroyed by fire in 1923 and replaced by a new building.

In 1953, a train wreck destroyed the town depot, and no new one is forthcoming.

In the race for mayor on November 8, 2011, the Butler County elections office results showed that a senior at Hampton–Dumont High School was elected. Jeremy Minnier, age 18, won with 24 write-in votes. Incumbent Mayor Virgil Homer received eight votes.

In April 2012. mayor Jeremy Minnier appeared on The Tonight Show with Jay Leno. Minnier discussed life in the small town and displayed photos. Host Leno and show guest Mel Gibson presented Minnier with a new town sign.

== Geography ==
According to the United States Census Bureau, the city has a total area of 0.99 square miles (2.56 km^{2}), all land.

== Demographics ==
Historical populations
Year	Pop.	±%
1890	99	—
1900	134	+35.4%
1910	161	+20.1%
1920	175	+8.7%
1930	204	+16.6%
1940	225	+10.3%
1950	204	−9.3%
1960	153	−25.0%
1970	126	−17.6%
1980	88	−30.2%
1990	88	+0.0%
2000	89	+1.1%
2010	74	−16.9%
2020	62	−16.2%
Source:"U.S. Census website". United States Census Bureau. and Iowa Data Center; Source: U.S. Decennial Census

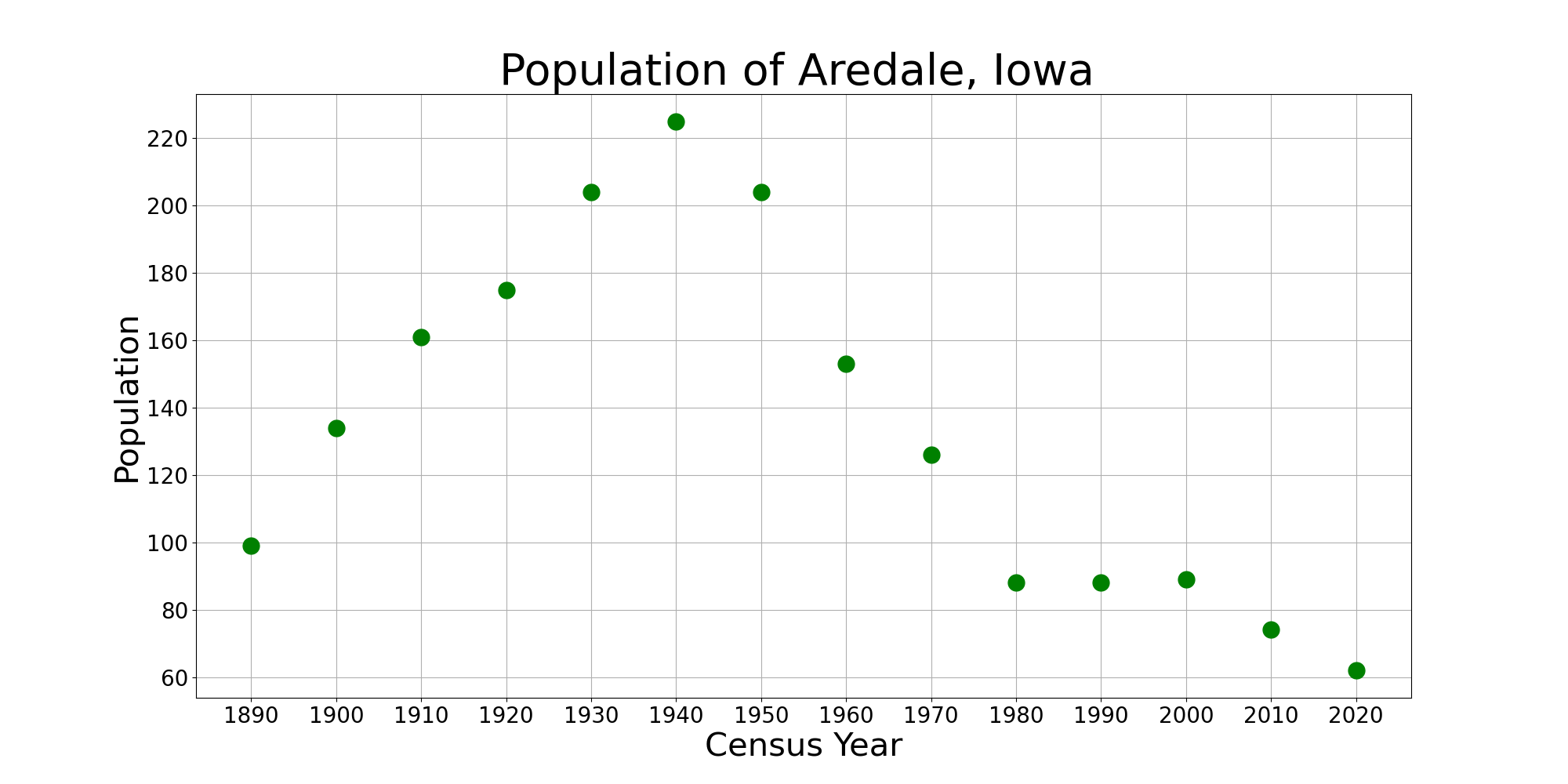
The population of Aredale, Iowa from US census data

=== 2020 census ===
As of the census of 2020, there were 62 people, 32 households, and 21 families residing in the city. The population density was 61.9 inhabitants per square mile (23.9/km^{2}). There were 36 housing units at an average density of 35.9 per square mile (13.9/km^{2}). The racial makeup of the city was 95.2% White, 0.0% Black or African American, 0.0% Native American, 0.0% Asian, 0.0% Pacific Islander, 0.0% from other races and 4.8% from two or more races. Hispanic or Latino persons of any race comprised 3.2% of the population.

Of the 32 households, 40.6% of which had children under the age of 18 living with them, 40.6% were married couples living together, 12.5% were cohabitating couples, 37.5% had a female householder with no spouse or partner present and 9.4% had a male householder with no spouse or partner present. 34.4% of all households were non-families. 21.9% of all households were made up of individuals, 15.6% had someone living alone who was 65 years old or older.

The median age in the city was 50.0 years. 22.6% of the residents were under the age of 20; 1.6% were between the ages of 20 and 24; 21.0% were from 25 and 44; 17.7% were from 45 and 64; and 37.1% were 65 years of age or older. The gender makeup of the city was 53.2% male and 46.8% female.

=== 2010 census ===
As of the census of 2010, there were 74 people, 35 households, and 21 families living in the city. The population density was 74.7 inhabitants per square mile (28.8/km^{2}). There were 40 housing units at an average density of 40.4 per square mile (15.6/km^{2}). The racial makeup of the city was 100.0% White. Hispanic or Latino of any race were 1.4% of the population.

There were 35 households, of which 28.6% had children under the age of 18 living with them, 42.9% were married couples living together, 5.7% had a female householder with no husband present, 11.4% had a male householder with no wife present, and 40.0% were non-families. 37.1% of all households were made up of individuals, and 20% had someone living alone who was 65 years of age or older. The average household size was 2.11 and the average family size was 2.62.

The median age in the city was 42.5 years. 21.6% of residents were under the age of 18; 9.5% were between the ages of 18 and 24; 20.3% were from 25 to 44; 27.1% were from 45 to 64; and 21.6% were 65 years of age or older. The gender makeup of the city was 52.7% male and 47.3% female.

=== 2000 census ===
As of the census of 2000, there were 89 people, 36 households, and 23 families living in the city. The population density was 89.0 inhabitants per square mile (34.4/km^{2}). There were 42 housing units at an average density of 42.0 per square mile (16.2/km^{2}). The racial makeup of the city was 98.88% White, and 1.12% from two or more races.

There were 36 households, out of which 30.6% had children under the age of 18 living with them, 50.0% were married couples living together, 5.6% had a female householder with no husband present, and 36.1% were non-families. 36.1% of all households were made up of individuals, and 27.8% had someone living alone who was 65 years of age or older. The average household size was 2.47 and the average family size was 3.09.

In the city, the population was spread out, with 25.8% under the age of 18, 11.2% from 18 to 24, 16.9% from 25 to 44, 24.7% from 45 to 64, and 21.3% who were 65 years of age or older. The median age was 38 years. For every 100 females, there were 117.1 males. For every 100 females age 18 and over, there were 106.3 males.

The median income for a household in the city was $32,500, and the median income for a family was $40,625. Males had a median income of $27,500 versus $18,750 for females. The per capita income for the city was $15,579. There were no families and 5.3% of the population living below the poverty line, including no under eighteens and 14.8% of those over 64.

== Education ==
Hampton–Dumont Community School District operates the area public schools. It was established on July 1, 1995, by the merger of the Dumont and Hampton school districts.
