= Fremont Township, Butler County, Iowa =

Township in Iowa, US

Fremont Township, Butler County
- Township
- Coordinates: 42°51′32″N 092°36′54″W
- Country: United States
- State: Iowa
- County: Butler

Area
  - Total: 36.78 sq mi (95.26 km^{2})
  - Land: 36.78 sq mi (95.26 km^{2})
  - Water: 0 sq mi (0 km^{2})
- Elevation: 974 ft (297 m)

Population (2020)
  - Total: 272
  - Density: 7.5/sq mi (2.9/km^{2})
- FIPS code: 19-91464
- GNIS feature ID: 0467875

Fremont Township is one of sixteen townships in Butler County, Iowa, USA. As of the 2020 census, its population was 272.

== Geography ==
Fremont Township covers an area of 36.78 square miles (95.3 km^{2}) and contains no incorporated settlements. According to the USGS, it contains two cemeteries: Pleasant Hill and Pleasant Valley.
