= Dumont, Iowa =

Dumont
- City
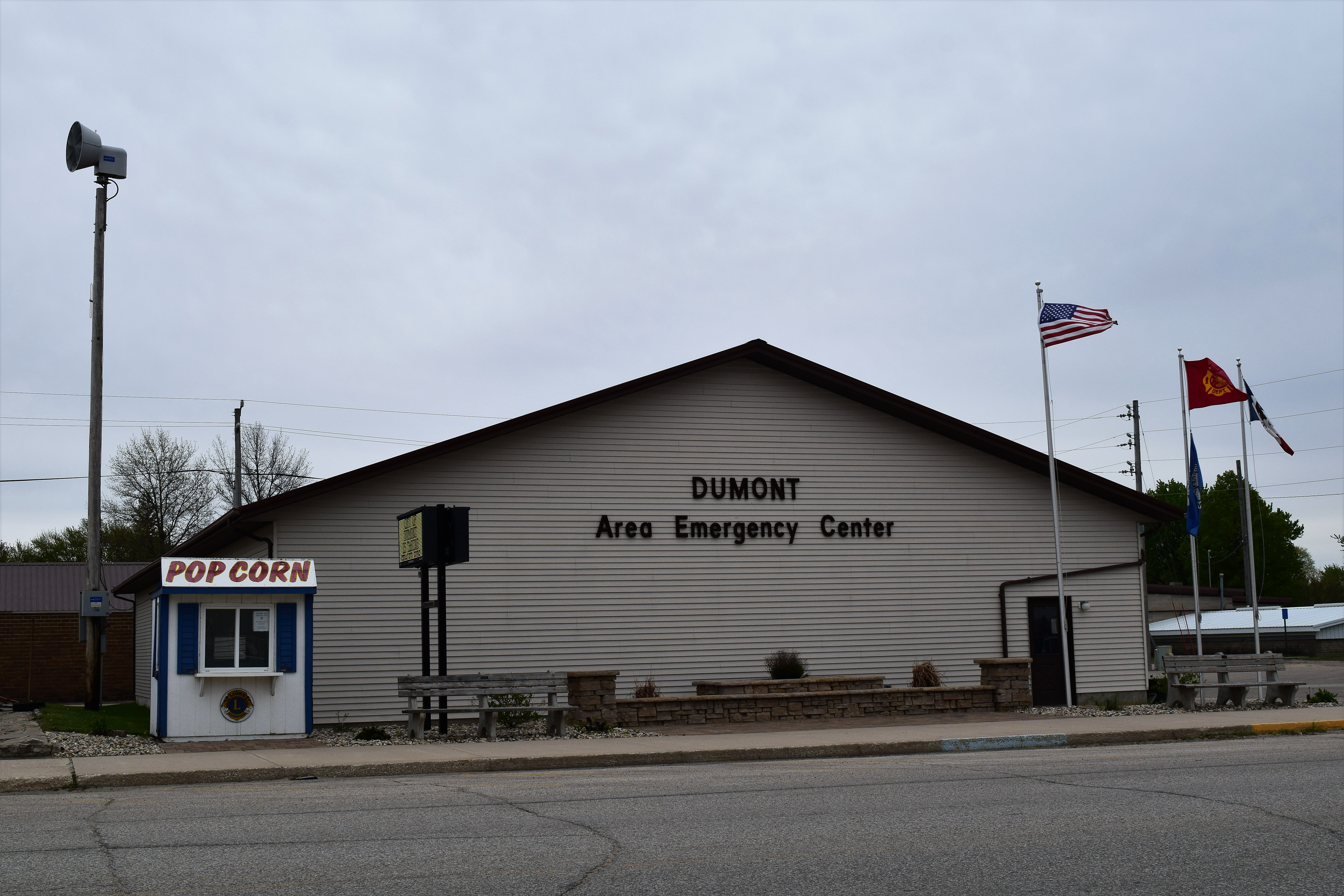
- Dumont Area Emergency Center
- Motto: Small town big heart
- Location of Dumont, Iowa
- Coordinates: 42°44′58″N 92°58′25″W
- Country: USA
- State: Iowa
- County: Butler

Area
  - Total: 1.75 sq mi (4.53 km^{2})
  - Land: 1.75 sq mi (4.53 km^{2})
  - Water: 0 sq mi (0.00 km^{2})
- Elevation: 1,007 ft (307 m)

Population (2020)
  - Total: 634
  - Density: 362.4/sq mi (139.93/km^{2})
- Time zone: UTC-6 (Central (CST))
  - Summer (DST): UTC-5 (CDT)
- ZIP code: 50625
- Area code: 641
- FIPS code: 19-22620
- GNIS feature ID: 2394570

Dumont is a city in Butler County, Iowa, United States. The population was 634 at the time of the 2020 census.

== History ==
A post office in Dumont has been in operation since 1882. The city was named for John M. Dumont, a miner in Colorado.

== Geography ==
Dumont is located approximately 11 miles east of Hampton on Highway 3.

According to the United States Census Bureau, the city has a total area of 1.76 square miles (4.56 km^{2}), all land.

== Demographics ==
Historical populations
Year	Pop.	±%
1900	433	—
1910	550	+27.0%
1920	609	+10.7%
1930	698	+14.6%
1940	762	+9.2%
1950	718	−5.8%
1960	719	+0.1%
1970	724	+0.7%
1980	815	+12.6%
1990	705	−13.5%
2000	676	−4.1%
2010	637	−5.8%
2020	634	−0.5%
Source:"U.S. Census website". United States Census Bureau. and Iowa Data Center; Source: U.S. Decennial Census

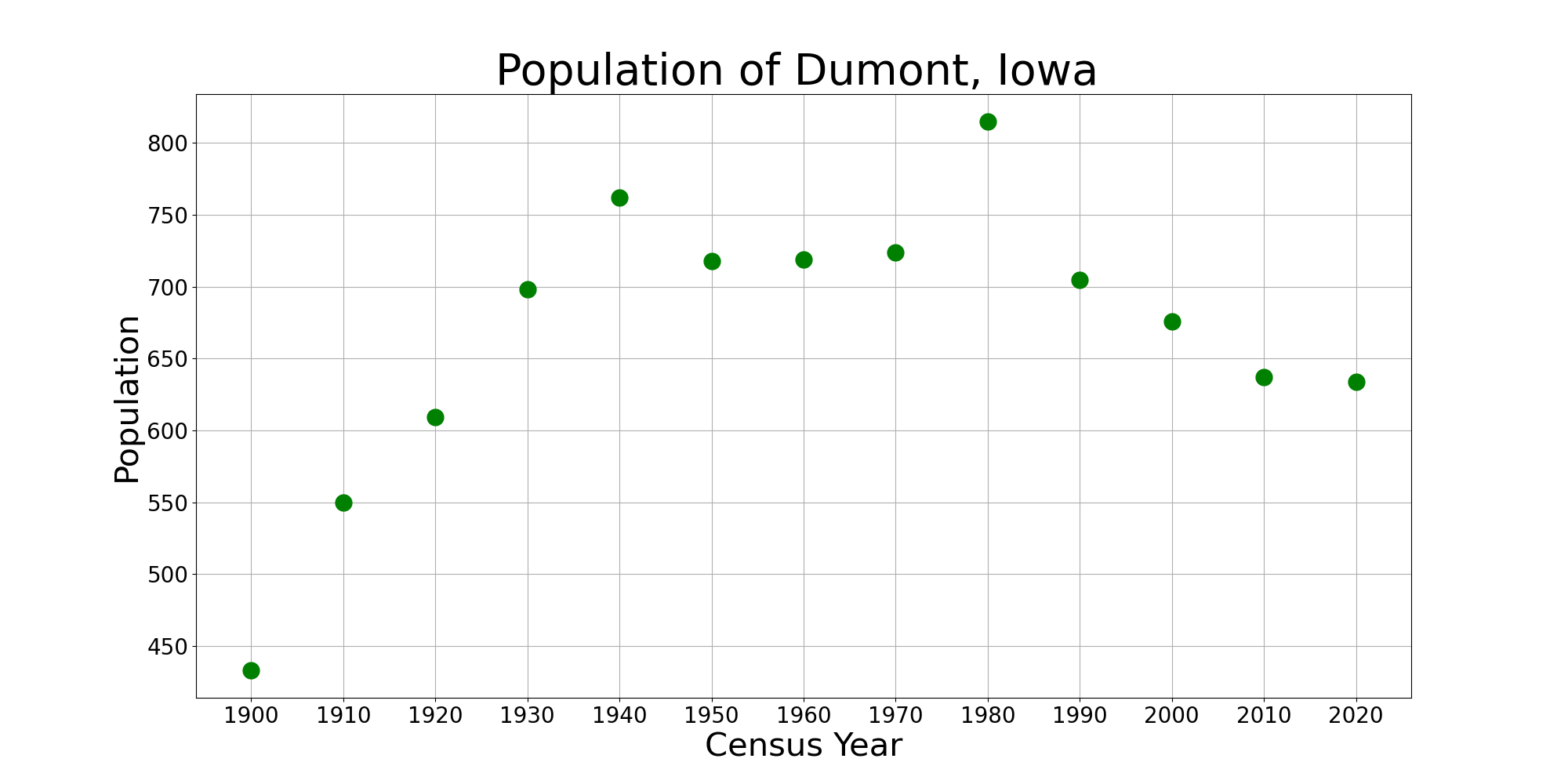
The population of Dumont, Iowa from US census data

=== 2020 census ===
As of the census of 2020, there were 634 people, 272 households, and 166 families residing in the city. The population density was 362.4 inhabitants per square mile (139.9/km^{2}). There were 294 housing units at an average density of 168.1 per square mile (64.9/km^{2}). The racial makeup of the city was 93.5% White, 0.2% Black or African American, 0.0% Native American, 0.0% Asian, 0.0% Pacific Islander, 3.0% from other races and 3.3% from two or more races. Hispanic or Latino persons of any race comprised 4.3% of the population.

Of the 272 households, 25.7% of which had children under the age of 18 living with them, 44.9% were married couples living together, 6.6% were cohabitating couples, 25.7% had a female householder with no spouse or partner present and 22.8% had a male householder with no spouse or partner present. 39.0% of all households were non-families. 32.7% of all households were made up of individuals, 19.9% had someone living alone who was 65 years old or older.

The median age in the city was 45.0 years. 22.9% of the residents were under the age of 20; 5.7% were between the ages of 20 and 24; 21.5% were from 25 and 44; 23.0% were from 45 and 64; and 27.0% were 65 years of age or older. The gender makeup of the city was 49.5% male and 50.5% female.

=== 2010 census ===
As of the census of 2010, there were 637 people, 281 households, and 165 families residing in the city. The population density was 361.9 inhabitants per square mile (139.7/km^{2}). There were 312 housing units at an average density of 177.3 per square mile (68.5/km^{2}). The racial makeup of the city was 98.7% White, 0.2% African American, 0.8% from other races, and 0.3% from two or more races. Hispanic or Latino of any race were 3.3% of the population.

There were 281 households, of which 24.9% had children under the age of 18 living with them, 46.3% were married couples living together, 8.2% had a female householder with no husband present, 4.3% had a male householder with no wife present, and 41.3% were non-families. 35.6% of all households were made up of individuals, and 20.7% had someone living alone who was 65 years of age or older. The average household size was 2.15 and the average family size was 2.77.

The median age in the city was 49.5 years. 20.4% of residents were under the age of 18; 5% were between the ages of 18 and 24; 19.8% were from 25 to 44; 27.8% were from 45 to 64; and 27% were 65 years of age or older. The gender makeup of the city was 43.8% male and 56.2% female.

=== 2000 census ===
As of the census of 2000, there were 676 people, 286 households, and 179 families residing in the city. The population density was 385.4 inhabitants per square mile (148.8/km^{2}). There were 316 housing units at an average density of 180.2 per square mile (69.6/km^{2}). The racial makeup of the city was 99.11% White, 0.30% African American, 0.15% Asian, 0.15% Pacific Islander, 0.15% from other races, and 0.15% from two or more races. Hispanic or Latino of any race were 1.48% of the population.

There were 286 households, out of which 24.8% had children under the age of 18 living with them, 52.8% were married couples living together, 6.6% had a female householder with no husband present, and 37.1% were non-families. 33.2% of all households were made up of individuals, and 23.8% had someone living alone who was 65 years of age or older. The average household size was 2.23 and the average family size was 2.84.

In the city, the population was spread out, with 21.4% under the age of 18, 5.0% from 18 to 24, 20.9% from 25 to 44, 20.3% from 45 to 64, and 32.4% who were 65 years of age or older. The median age was 47 years. For every 100 females, there were 85.7 males. For every 100 females age 18 and over, there were 82.5 males.

The median income for a household in the city was $27,708, and the median income for a family was $36,786. Males had a median income of $29,938 versus $16,848 for females. The per capita income for the city was $15,260. About 7.3% of families and 8.7% of the population were below the poverty line, including 3.6% of those under age 18 and 17.1% of those age 65 or over.

== Education ==
Hampton–Dumont Community School District operates the area public schools. It was established on July 1, 1995, by the merger of the Dumont and Hampton school districts.
