= Pittsford Township, Butler County, Iowa =

Township in Iowa, US

Pittsford Township, Butler County
- Township
- Coordinates: 42°46′39″N 092°57′53″W
- Country: United States
- State: Iowa
- County: Butler

Area
  - Total: 36.57 sq mi (94.72 km^{2})
  - Land: 36.54 sq mi (94.64 km^{2})
  - Water: 0.031 sq mi (0.08 km^{2})
- Elevation: 991 ft (302 m)

Population (2020)
  - Total: 859
  - Density: 24/sq mi (9.1/km^{2})
- FIPS code: 19-93339
- GNIS feature ID: 0468521

Pittsford Township is one of sixteen townships in Butler County, Iowa, USA. As of the 2020 census, its population was 859.

== Geography ==
Pittsford Township covers an area of 36.57 square miles (94.7 km^{2}) and contains one incorporated settlement, Dumont. According to the USGS, it contains six cemeteries: Dumont, Harlan, Needham, Oak Hill, Old Bristow and South Bristow.
