= Jackson Township, Butler County, Iowa =

Township in Iowa, US

Jackson Township, Butler County
- Township
- Coordinates: 42°46′02″N 092°43′48″W
- Country: United States
- State: Iowa
- County: Butler

Area
  - Total: 36.38 sq mi (94.23 km^{2})
  - Land: 36.21 sq mi (93.78 km^{2})
  - Water: 0.17 sq mi (0.45 km^{2})
- Elevation: 1,033 ft (315 m)

Population (2020)
  - Total: 628
  - Density: 17/sq mi (6.7/km^{2})
- FIPS code: 19-92100
- GNIS feature ID: 0468094

Jackson Township is one of sixteen townships in Butler County, Iowa, United States. As of the 2020 census, its population was 628.

== Geography ==
Jackson Township covers an area of 36.38 square miles (94.2 km^{2}) and contains no incorporated settlements. According to the USGS, it contains three cemeteries: Allison, Butler County Poor Farm and Lynwood.
