= Allison, Iowa =

- City
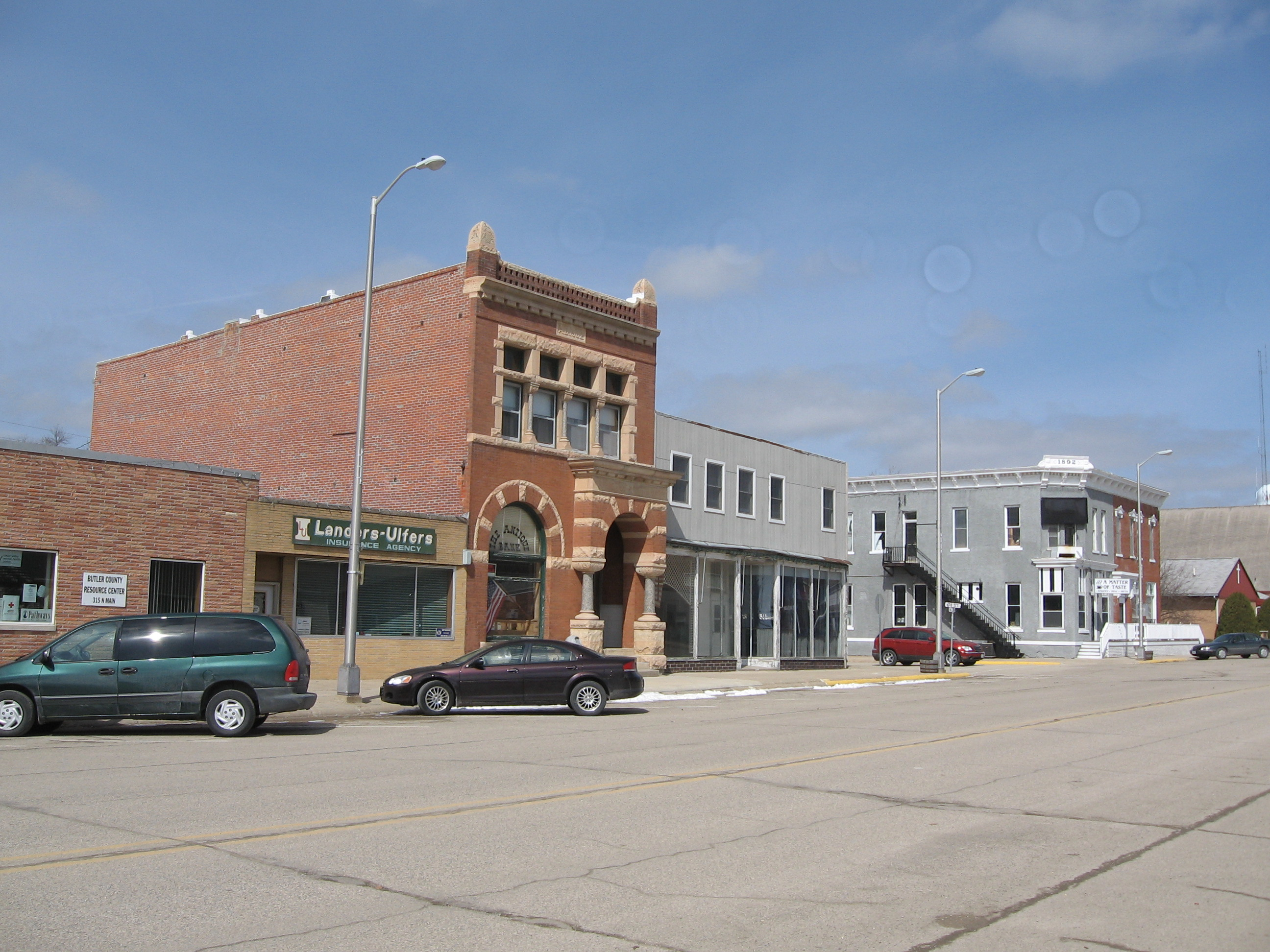
- Downtown Allison, Iowa, March 2008

- Location of Allison, Iowa
- Coordinates: 42°44′57″N 92°47′45″W
- Country: USA
- State: Iowa
- County: Butler

Government
  - Type: Municipal city

Area
  - Total: 2.93 sq mi (7.59 km^{2})
  - Land: 2.93 sq mi (7.59 km^{2})
  - Water: 0 sq mi (0.00 km^{2})
- Elevation: 1,047 ft (319 m)

Population (2020)
  - Total: 966
  - Density: 329.6/sq mi (127.24/km^{2})
- Time zone: UTC-6 (Central (CST))
  - Summer (DST): UTC-5 (CDT)
- ZIP code: 50602
- Area code: 319
- FIPS code: 19-01315
- GNIS feature ID: 2393924
- Website: www.cityofallisonia.gov

Allison is a city in, and the county seat of, Butler County, Iowa, United States. The population was 966 at the 2020 census. Allison is home to the Butler County Fair. The city was named for U.S. Senator William B. Allison in 1881.

== Geography ==
According to the United States Census Bureau, the city has a total area of 2.93 square miles (7.59 km^{2}), all land.

== Demographics ==
Historical population
Year	Pop.	±%
1900	463	—
1910	495	+6.9%
1920	520	+5.1%
1930	603	+16.0%
1940	708	+17.4%
1950	771	+8.9%
1960	952	+23.5%
1970	1,071	+12.5%
1980	1,132	+5.7%
1990	1,000	−11.7%
2000	1,006	+0.6%
2010	1,029	+2.3%
2020	966	−6.1%
Source: "U.S. Census website". United States Census Bureau. Source: U.S. Decennial Census

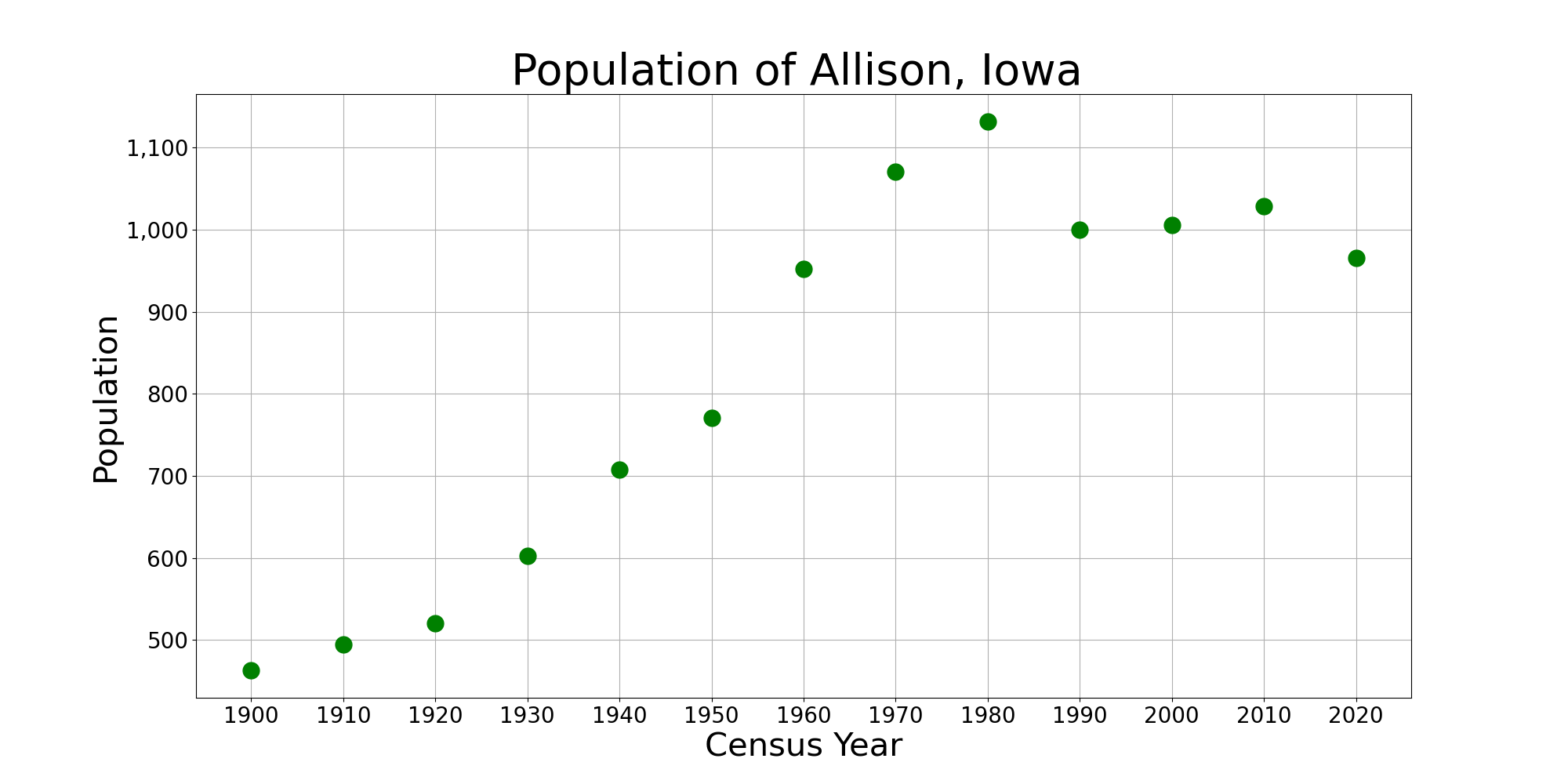
The population of Allison, Iowa from US census data

=== 2020 census ===
As of the census of 2020, there were 966 people, 426 households, and 270 families residing in the city. The population density was 329.6 inhabitants per square mile (127.2/km^{2}). There were 466 housing units at an average density of 159.0 per square mile (61.4/km^{2}). The racial makeup of the city was 97.1% White, 0.2% Black or African American, 0.4% Native American, 0.1% Asian, 0.0% Pacific Islander, 0.1% from other races and 2.1% from two or more races. Hispanic or Latino persons of any race comprised 1.3% of the population.

Of the 426 households, 23.2% of which had children under the age of 18 living with them, 50.7% were married couples living together, 7.3% were cohabitating couples, 24.4% had a female householder with no spouse or partner present and 17.6% had a male householder with no spouse or partner present. 36.6% of all households were non-families. 30.3% of all households were made up of individuals, 19.7% had someone living alone who was 65 years old or older.

The median age in the city was 45.2 years. 22.5% of the residents were under the age of 20; 4.6% were between the ages of 20 and 24; 22.9% were from 25 and 44; 21.3% were from 45 and 64; and 28.8% were 65 years of age or older. The gender makeup of the city was 48.2% male and 51.8% female.

=== 2010 census ===
As of the census of 2010, there were 1,029 people, 440 households, and 277 families living in the city. The population density was 351.2 inhabitants per square mile (135.6/km^{2}). There were 470 housing units at an average density of 160.4 per square mile (61.9/km^{2}). The racial makeup of the city was 99.4% White, 0.1% Asian, and 0.5% from two or more races. Hispanic or Latino people of any race were 0.2% of the population.

There were 440 households, of which 25.9% had children under the age of 18 living with them, 53.4% were married couples living together, 6.4% had a female householder with no husband present, 3.2% had a male householder with no wife present, and 37.0% were non-families. 32.3% of all households were made up of individuals, and 19.6% had someone living alone who was 65 years of age or older. The average household size was 2.22 and the average family size was 2.77.

The median age in the city was 46.4 years. 21.9% of residents were under the age of 18; 6.4% were between the ages of 18 and 24; 20.3% were from 25 to 44; 25.1% were from 45 to 64; and 26.2% were 65 years of age or older. The gender makeup of the city was 46.6% male and 53.4% female.

=== 2000 census ===
As of the census of 2000, there were 1,006 people, 424 households, and 267 families living in the city. The population density was 341.2 inhabitants per square mile (131.7/km^{2}). There were 454 housing units at an average density of 154.0 per square mile (59.5/km^{2}). The racial makeup of the city was 99.50% White, 0.10% from other races, and 0.40% from two or more races. Hispanic or Latino people of any race were 0.30% of the population.

There were 424 households, out of which 25.9% had children under the age of 18 living with them, 55.4% were married couples living together, 6.1% had a female householder with no husband present, and 36.8% were non-families. 33.0% of all households were made up of individuals, and 23.1% had someone living alone who was 65 years of age or older. The average household size was 2.20 and the average family size was 2.81.

Age spread: 20.8% under the age of 18, 6.7% from 18 to 24, 21.7% from 25 to 44, 20.1% from 45 to 64, and 30.8% who were 65 years of age or older. The median age was 46 years. For every 100 females, there were 85.6 males. For every 100 females age 18 and over, there were 76.7 males.

The median income for a household in the city was $34,338, and the median income for a family was $42,050. Males had a median income of $30,147 versus $18,929 for females. The per capita income for the city was $16,472. About 5.8% of families and 8.9% of the population were below the poverty line, including 8.2% of those under age 18 and 11.4% of those age 65 or over.

== Education ==
Allison is a part of the North Butler Community School District, which was established on July 1, 2011, by a merger of the Greene Community School District and Allison–Bristow Community School District. The local high school is North Butler High School.
