= North Butler High School =

Public secondary school in Greene, Iowa, United States

North Butler Jr/Sr High School

Location
- 201 North 5th Street; Greene, Iowa 50636; United States; 42.8993°N 92.7995°W

Information
- Type: Public secondary
- Motto: "It's great to be a bearcat"
- School district: North Butler Community School District (2011–present); Greene Community School District (2004–2011)
- Superintendent: Joel Foster
- Principal: Heather Holm
- Teaching staff: 21.27 (FTE)
- Grades: 7–12
- Enrollment: 254 (2024-2025)
- Student to teacher ratio: 11.94
- Campus: Rural
- Colors: Navy and maize
- Athletics conference: Top of Iowa Conference
- Mascot: Bearcats
- Website: www.northbutler.k12.ia.us

North Butler High School is a rural public high school in Greene, Iowa, United States. It is a part of the North Butler Community School District; it was operated by the Greene Community School District until 2011, when that district merged into the North Butler district.

It was a merger of Greene High School and Allison–Bristow High School, and it began operations in 2004 after the Greene and Allison–Bristow school districts began a grade-sharing agreement.

== Athletics ==
The athletic extracurricular activities at North Butler High School are cross country, football, volleyball, basketball, wrestling, golf, track and field, softball, baseball, cheer leading, and dance team. The Bearcats participate in the Top of Iowa Conference.

In 2004, its American football classification was 1A, while its predecessor schools were Class A.

=== State championships ===
The girls' basketball team were the Class 2A State Champions in 2006 and 2007.

== See also ==
- List of high schools in Iowa
