= Clarksville, Iowa =

City in Iowa, United States

- City
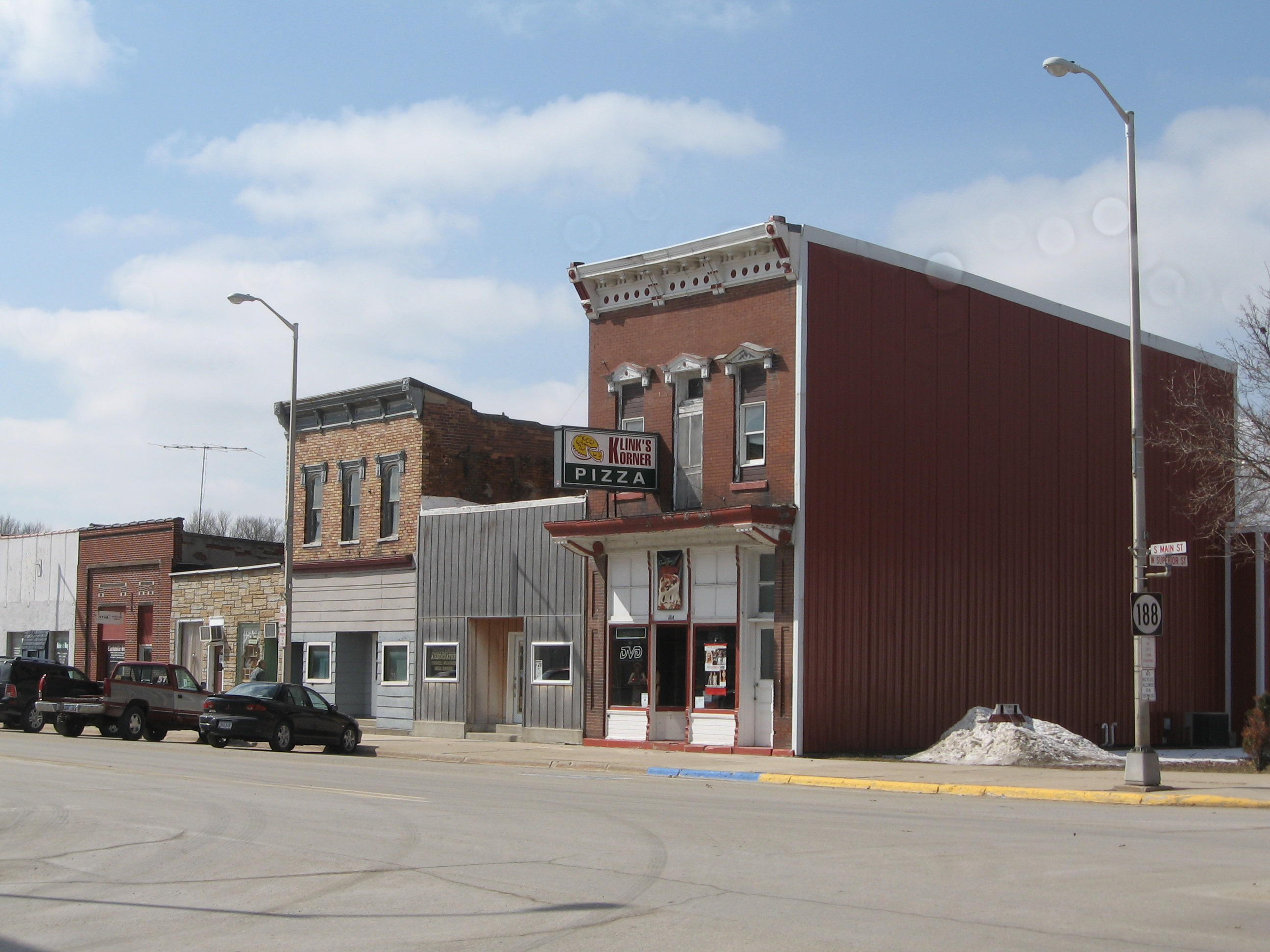
- Downtown Clarksville

- Location of Clarksville, Iowa
- Coordinates: 42°46′47″N 92°40′05″W
- Country: USA
- State: Iowa
- County: Butler
- Incorporated: May 11, 1874

Area
  - Total: 1.35 sq mi (3.49 km^{2})
  - Land: 1.31 sq mi (3.39 km^{2})
  - Water: 0.039 sq mi (0.10 km^{2})
- Elevation: 932 ft (284 m)

Population (2020)
  - Total: 1,264
  - Density: 965.9/sq mi (372.95/km^{2})
- Time zone: UTC-6 (Central (CST))
  - Summer (DST): UTC-5 (CDT)
- ZIP code: 50619
- Area code: 319
- FIPS code: 19-13755
- GNIS feature ID: 2393544
- Website: www.clarksvilleiowa.com

Clarksville is a city in Butler County, Iowa, United States, along the Shell Rock River. The population was 1,264 at the 2020 census. A post office opened in Clarksville in 1861.

== Geography ==
According to the United States Census Bureau, the city has a total area of 1.37 square miles (3.55 km^{2}), of which 1.33 square miles (3.44 km^{2}) is land and 0.04 square miles (0.10 km^{2}) is water.

== Demographics ==
Historical populations
Year	Pop.	±%
1880	818	—
1890	735	−10.1%
1900	849	+15.5%
1910	895	+5.4%
1920	1,003	+12.1%
1930	1,143	+14.0%
1940	1,240	+8.5%
1950	1,210	−2.4%
1960	1,328	+9.8%
1970	1,360	+2.4%
1980	1,424	+4.7%
1990	1,382	−2.9%
2000	1,441	+4.3%
2010	1,439	−0.1%
2020	1,264	−12.2%
Source:"U.S. Census website". United States Census Bureau. and Iowa Data Center; Source: U.S. Decennial Census

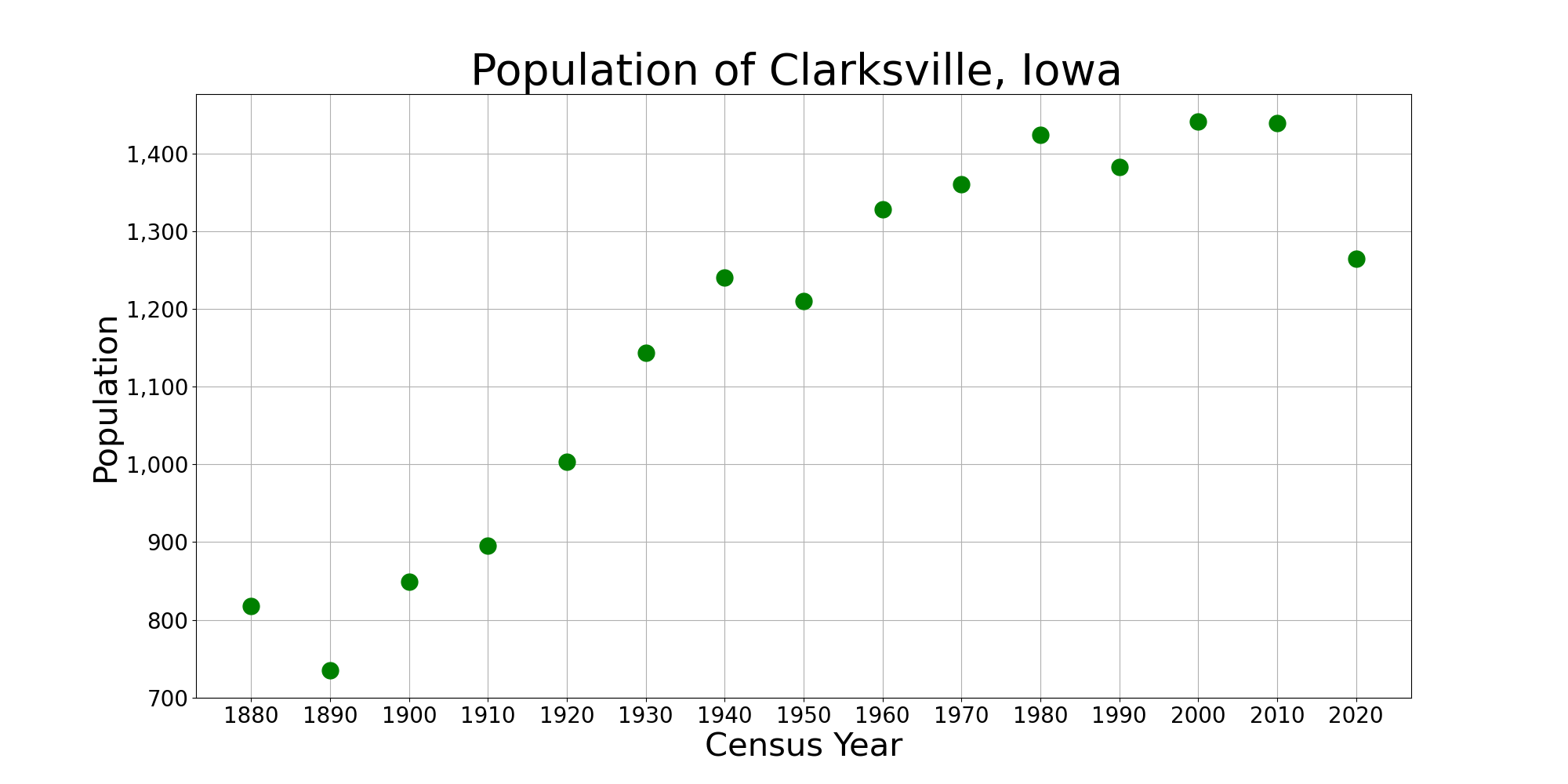
The population of Clarksville, Iowa from US census data

=== 2020 census ===
As of the 2020 census, Clarksville had a population of 1,264, with 554 households and 364 families residing in the city. The population density was 965.9 inhabitants per square mile (373.0/km^{2}).

The median age was 45.9 years. 22.6% of residents were under the age of 18 and 24.9% were 65 years of age or older. 24.4% of residents were under the age of 20; 3.3% were between the ages of 20 and 24; 21.4% were from 25 to 44; and 25.9% were from 45 to 64. For every 100 females, there were 91.8 males, and for every 100 females age 18 and over, there were 88.4 males age 18 and over. The gender makeup of the city was 47.9% male and 52.1% female.

Of all households, 29.1% had children under the age of 18 living with them, 51.3% were married-couple households, 6.1% were cohabiting-couple households, 17.5% were households with a male householder and no spouse or partner present, and 25.1% were households with a female householder and no spouse or partner present. 34.3% of households were non-families, 31.0% were made up of individuals, and 15.0% had someone living alone who was 65 years of age or older.

There were 578 housing units at an average density of 441.7 per square mile (170.5/km^{2}). 4.2% of housing units were vacant. The homeowner vacancy rate was 0.0% and the rental vacancy rate was 10.7%.

0.0% of residents lived in urban areas, while 100.0% lived in rural areas.

Racial composition as of the 2020 census
Race	Number	Percent
White	1,227	97.1%
Black or African American	0	0.0%
American Indian and Alaska Native	1	0.1%
Asian	3	0.2%
Native Hawaiian and Other Pacific Islander	0	0.0%
Some other race	5	0.4%
Two or more races	28	2.2%
Hispanic or Latino (of any race)	16	1.3%

=== 2010 census ===
As of the census of 2010, there were 1,439 people, 573 households, and 401 families living in the city. The population density was 1,082.0 inhabitants per square mile (417.8/km^{2}). There were 619 housing units at an average density of 465.4 per square mile (179.7/km^{2}). The racial makeup of the city was 98.0% White, 0.1% African American, 0.2% Native American, 0.4% Asian, 0.1% Pacific Islander, 0.1% from other races, and 1.1% from two or more races. Hispanic or Latino of any race were 1.2% of the population.

There were 573 households, of which 31.2% had children under the age of 18 living with them, 53.8% were married couples living together, 10.3% had a female householder with no husband present, 5.9% had a male householder with no wife present, and 30.0% were non-families. 25.5% of all households were made up of individuals, and 12.6% had someone living alone who was 65 years of age or older. The average household size was 2.43 and the average family size was 2.86.

The median age in the city was 40.2 years. 24.7% of residents were under the age of 18; 7.1% were between the ages of 18 and 24; 23.8% were from 25 to 44; 24.1% were from 45 to 64; and 20% were 65 years of age or older. The gender makeup of the city was 47.9% male and 52.1% female.

=== 2000 census ===
As of the census of 2000, there were 1,441 people, 581 households, and 393 families living in the city. The population density was 1,056.0 inhabitants per square mile (407.7/km^{2}). There were 611 housing units at an average density of 447.8 per square mile (172.9/km^{2}). The racial makeup of the city was 99.03% White, none Black or African American, 0.07% Native American, 0.21% Asian, none Pacific Islander, 0.14% from other races, and 0.56% from two or more races. 0.35% of the population were Hispanic or Latino of any race.

There were 581 households, out of which 32.9% had children under the age of 18 living with them, 55.2% were married couples living together, 8.8% had a female householder with no husband present, and 32.2% were non-families. 28.7% of all households were made up of individuals, and 17.7% had someone living alone who was 65 years of age or older. The average household size was 2.38 and the average family size was 2.91.

In the city, the population was spread out, with 25.0% under the age of 18, 6.4% from 18 to 24, 26.6% from 25 to 44, 20.5% from 45 to 64, and 21.6% who were 65 years of age or older. For every 100 females, there were 85.2 males. For every 100 females age 18 and over, there were 82.0 males.

The median income for a household in the city was $32,857, and the median income for a family was $37,457. Males had a median income of $28,795 versus $20,821 for females. The per capita income for the city was $14,811. About 8.2% of families and 9.7% of the population were below the poverty line, including 13.3% of those under age 18 and 9.6% of those age 65 or over.

== Education ==
Clarksville Community School District operates local public schools.

== Notable person ==
Clarksville native Maddie Poppe won season 16 of American Idol in 2018.

Milo Mather: Engineer and accomplished amateur astronomer. Builder of the Mather telescope located at Iowa State University.

Jeffrey John Downs: Actor, appearing on the show: “60 days in”
