= Butler County, Iowa =

County in Iowa, United States

- County
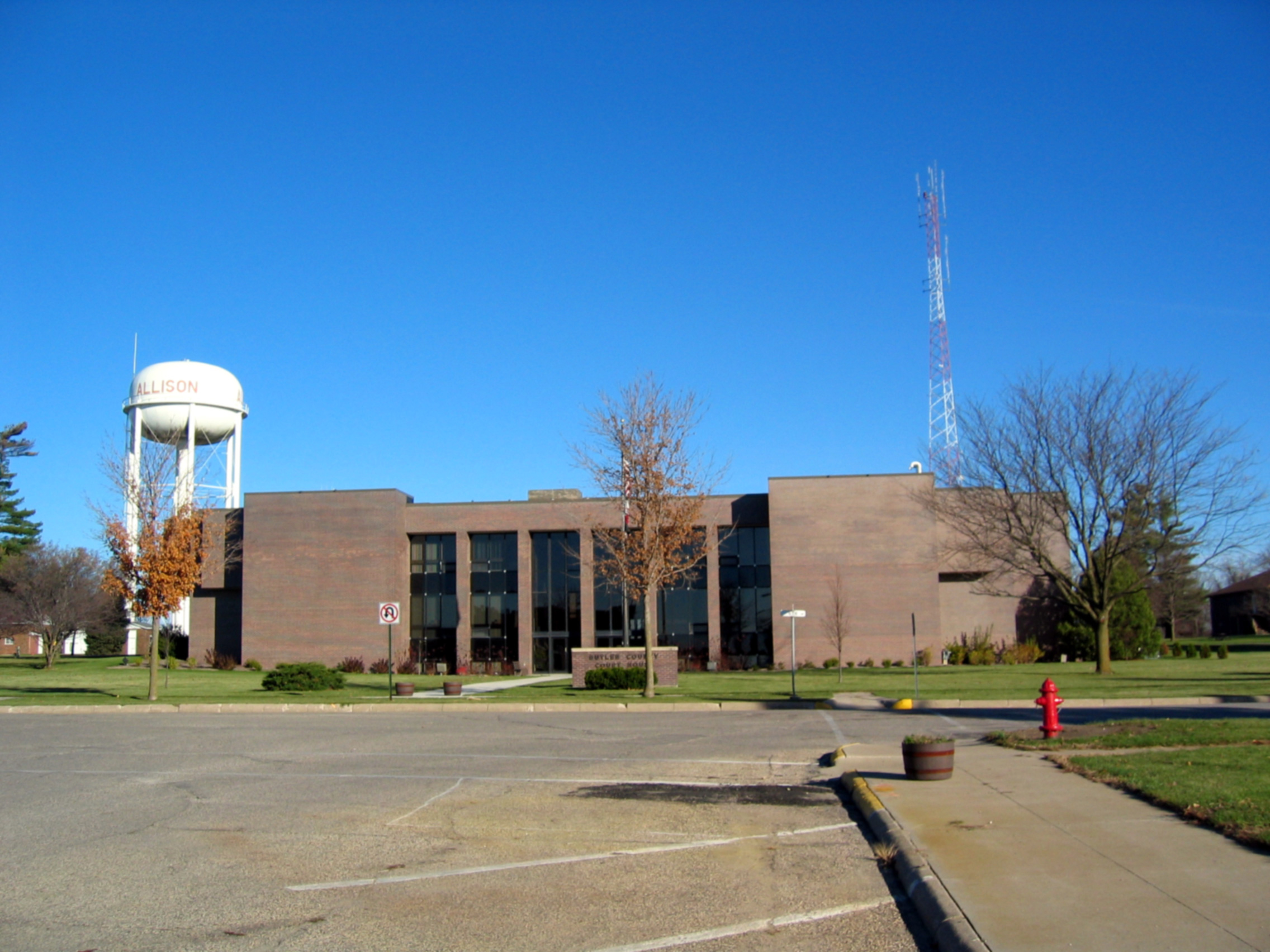
- Butler County Courthouse

- Location within the U.S. state of Iowa
- Coordinates: 42°43′54″N 92°47′29″W
- Country: United States
- State: Iowa
- Founded: 1851
- Named for: William Orlando Butler
- Seat: Allison
- Largest city: Parkersburg

Area
  - Total: 582 sq mi (1,510 km^{2})
  - Land: 580 sq mi (1,500 km^{2})
  - Water: 1.6 sq mi (4.1 km^{2}) 0.3%

Population (2020)
  - Total: 14,334
  - Estimate (2025): 14,049 ▼
  - Density: 25/sq mi (9.5/km^{2})
- Time zone: UTC−6 (Central)
  - Summer (DST): UTC−5 (CDT)
- Congressional district: 2nd
- Website: butlercounty.iowa.gov
- Iowa county number 12

Butler County is a county located in the U.S. state of Iowa. As of the 2020 census, the population was 14,334. Its county seat is Allison. The county was organized in 1854 and named for General William O. Butler.

== History ==
Butler County was formed on January 15, 1851, from open land. It was named after Kentucky native William Orlando Butler, a general and hero of the Mexican–American War, who ran as Vice President of the United States in 1848. Until 1854, the county was governed by other counties. Only at this time did it have enough inhabitants to establish its own local government. The first court proceedings were conducted in a small log cabin of a settler. In 1858, the first courthouse was completed in Clarksville. After it was sold shortly thereafter to the local school district, it was used as a schoolhouse from 1863 until 1903.

Clarksville was the first county seat, from 1854 to 1860, after which Butler Center became the seat. Because locals became disenchanted with Butler Center (partially because of its inaccessibility during the winter), Allison was made the county seat on January 10, 1881, after the tracks of the Dubuque and Dakota Railroad had been laid there.

Butler County is the only county in Iowa that does not have any four-lane roads (US Highway or interstate), a hospital, or a movie theatre. There are also no national fast-food chains in Butler county. As well as one of the only counties in Iowa without a stoplight.

== Geography ==
According to the U.S. Census Bureau, the county has a total area of 582 square miles (1,510 km^{2}), of which 580 square miles (1,500 km^{2}) is land and 1.6 square miles (4.1 km^{2}) (0.3%) is water.

=== Major highways ===
- Iowa Highway 3
- Iowa Highway 14
- Iowa Highway 57
- Iowa Highway 188

=== Adjacent counties ===
- Floyd County (north)
- Bremer County (east)
- Black Hawk County (southeast)
- Grundy County (south)
- Franklin County (west)
- Chickasaw County (northeast)
- Cerro Gordo County (northwest)
- Hardin County (southwest)

== Demographics ==
Historical population
Census	Pop.	Note	%±
1860	3,724		—
1870	9,951		167.2%
1880	14,293		43.6%
1890	15,463		8.2%
1900	17,955		16.1%
1910	17,119		−4.7%
1920	17,845		4.2%
1930	17,617		−1.3%
1940	17,986		2.1%
1950	17,394		−3.3%
1960	17,467		0.4%
1970	16,953		−2.9%
1980	17,668		4.2%
1990	15,731		−11.0%
2000	15,305		−2.7%
2010	14,867		−2.9%
2020	14,334		−3.6%
2025 (est.)	14,049	▼	−2.0%
U.S. Decennial Census; 1790-1960 1900-1990; 1990-2000 2010-2018

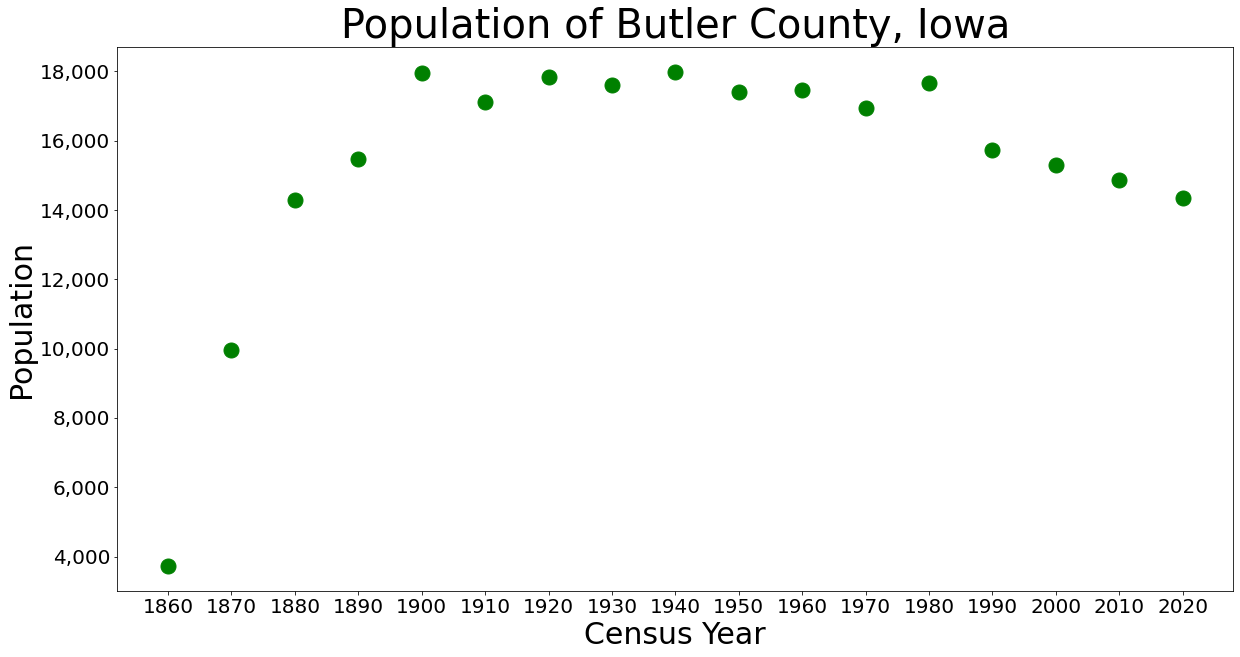
Population of Butler County from US census data

=== 2020 census ===
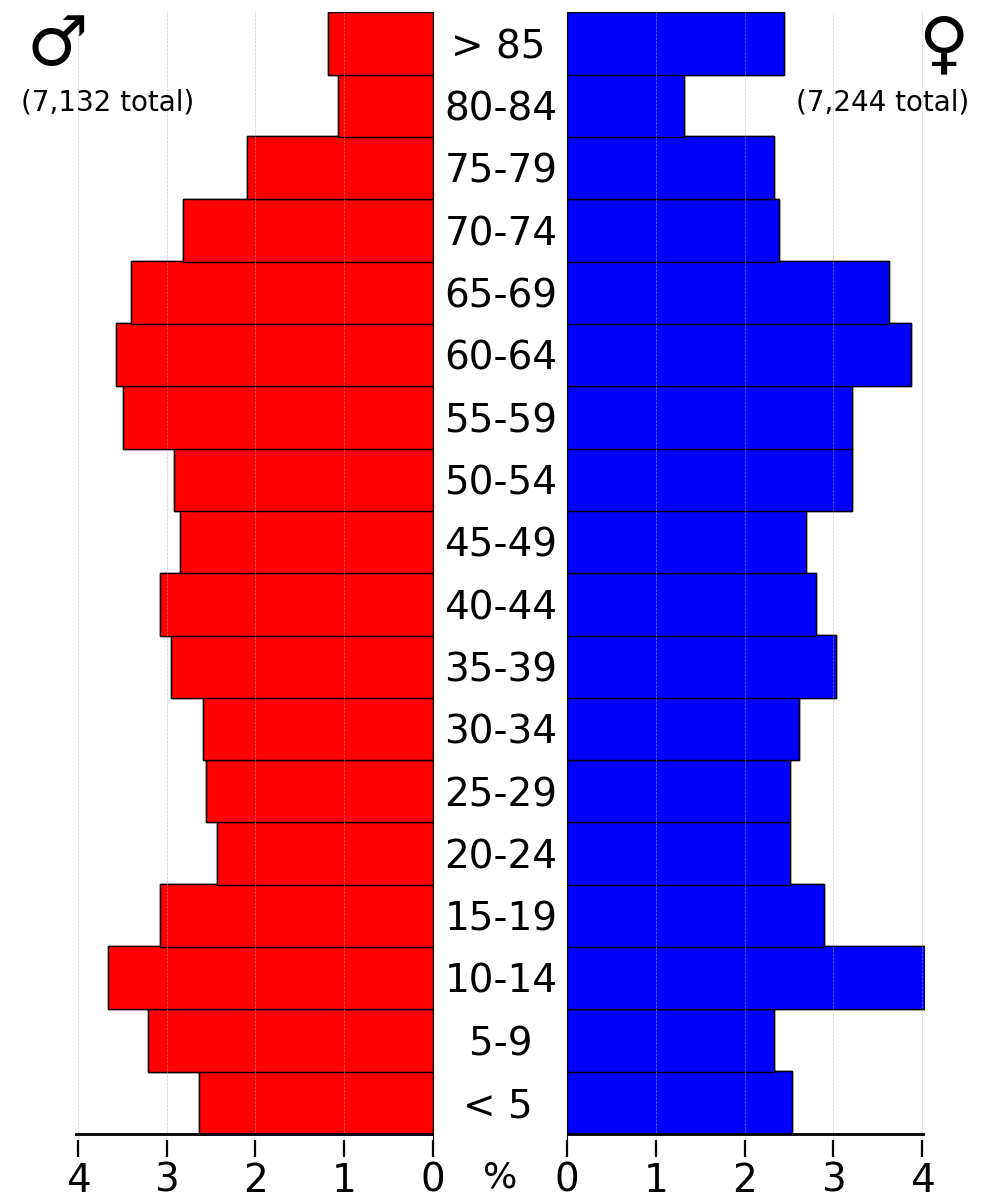
2022 US Census population pyramid for Butler County from ACS 5-year estimates

As of the 2020 census, the county had a population of 14,334, and the population density was 24.6/sq mi (9.5/km^{2}). The median age was 45.3 years; 22.4% of residents were under the age of 18 and 24.3% of residents were 65 years of age or older. For every 100 females there were 98.5 males, and for every 100 females age 18 and over there were 95.9 males age 18 and over.

The racial makeup of the county was 96.5% White, 0.2% Black or African American, 0.2% American Indian and Alaska Native, 0.2% Asian, <0.1% Native Hawaiian and Pacific Islander, 0.5% from some other race, and 2.5% from two or more races. Hispanic or Latino residents of any race comprised 1.3% of the population.

<0.1% of residents lived in urban areas, while 100.0% lived in rural areas. There were 5,992 households in the county, of which 26.8% had children under the age of 18 living in them. Of all households, 57.3% were married-couple households, 16.6% were households with a male householder and no spouse or partner present, and 20.9% were households with a female householder and no spouse or partner present. About 27.5% of all households were made up of individuals and 14.0% had someone living alone who was 65 years of age or older.

There were 6,536 housing units, of which 8.3% were vacant. Among occupied housing units, 82.9% were owner-occupied and 17.1% were renter-occupied. The homeowner vacancy rate was 1.6% and the rental vacancy rate was 12.4%.

=== 2010 census ===
The 2010 census recorded a population of 14,867 in the county, with a population density of 25.6/sq mi (9.9/km^{2}). There were 6,682 housing units, of which 6,120 were occupied.

=== 2000 census ===
As of the census of 2000, there were 15,305 people, 6,175 households, and 4,470 families residing in the county. The population density was 26 people per square mile (10 people/km^{2}). There were 6,578 housing units at an average density of 11 units per square mile (4.2 units/km^{2}). The racial makeup of the county was 98.95% White, 0.08% Black or African American, 0.05% Native American, 0.20% Asian, 0.02% Pacific Islander, 0.16% from other races, and 0.53% from two or more races. 0.58% of the population were Hispanic or Latino of any race.

There were 6,175 households, out of which 30.90% had children under the age of 18 living with them, 62.80% were married couples living together, 6.30% had a female householder with no husband present, and 27.60% were non-families. 25.00% of all households were made up of individuals, and 14.50% had someone living alone who was 65 years of age or older. The average household size was 2.43 and the average family size was 2.90.

In the county, the population was spread out, with 24.40% under the age of 18, 6.40% from 18 to 24, 24.90% from 25 to 44, 24.20% from 45 to 64, and 20.10% who were 65 years of age or older. The median age was 41 years. For every 100 females, there were 96.20 males. For every 100 females age 18 and over, there were 93.70 males.

The median income for a household in the county was $35,883, and the median income for a family was $42,209. Males had a median income of $30,356 versus $20,864 for females. The per capita income for the county was $17,036. About 6.50% of families and 8.00% of the population were below the poverty line, including 9.80% of those under age 18 and 9.40% of those age 65 or over.

== Communities ==
=== Cities ===
- Allison
- Aplington
- Aredale
- Bristow
- Clarksville
- Dumont
- Greene
- New Hartford
- Parkersburg
- Shell Rock

=== Unincorporated communities ===
- Austinville
- Butler Center
- Eleanor
- Kesley
- Packard
- Sinclair
- Vilmar

=== Townships ===
Butler County is divided into sixteen townships:

- Albion
- Beaver
- Bennezette
- Butler
- Coldwater
- Dayton
- Fremont
- Jackson
- Jefferson
- Madison
- Monroe
- Pittsford
- Ripley
- Shell Rock
- Washington
- West Point

=== Population ranking ===
The population ranking of the following table is based on the 2020 census of Butler County.

† county seat

Rank	City/Town/etc.	Municipal type	Population (2020 Census)
1	Parkersburg	City	2,015
2	Shell Rock	City	1,268
3	Clarksville	City	1,264
4	Aplington	City	1,116
5	Greene (partially in Floyd County)	City	990
6	† Allison	City	966
7	Dumont	City	634
8	New Hartford	City	570
9	Bristow	City	145
10	Aredale	City	62

== Politics ==
Butler County has long been consistently Republican. Since the county's founding in 1851, it has only favored candidates of another party four times. The first occasion was in 1912, when former Republican Theodore Roosevelt won the county as the Progressive candidate. The next two times were during two landslide victories for Franklin D. Roosevelt in 1932 and 1936. Finally, the most recent occurrence was in 1996, when incumbent Bill Clinton won the county with a plurality, aided in part by a strong third party performance by Ross Perot; furthermore, Clinton only defeated Republican candidate Bob Dole in Butler County by just 25 votes and a slim margin of 0.38%. No Democrat has ever received more than 57% of the vote in the county's history.

United States presidential election results for Butler County, Iowa
Year	Republican		Democratic		Third party(ies)	
Year	No.	%	No.	%	No.	%
1896	2,670	66.07%	1,302	32.22%	69	1.71%
1900	2,902	70.01%	1,167	28.15%	76	1.83%
1904	2,743	74.99%	815	22.28%	100	2.73%
1908	2,467	69.32%	994	27.93%	98	2.75%
1912	903	25.82%	926	26.48%	1,668	47.70%
1916	2,722	72.45%	977	26.00%	58	1.54%
1920	5,900	86.69%	830	12.20%	76	1.12%
1924	3,823	59.57%	667	10.39%	1,928	30.04%
1928	4,789	71.50%	1,876	28.01%	33	0.49%
1932	3,012	42.33%	4,028	56.60%	76	1.07%
1936	3,604	47.73%	3,786	50.14%	161	2.13%
1940	4,848	63.56%	2,760	36.18%	20	0.26%
1944	4,182	65.03%	2,225	34.60%	24	0.37%
1948	3,380	51.90%	3,008	46.18%	125	1.92%
1952	6,360	77.47%	1,836	22.36%	14	0.17%
1956	5,669	71.21%	2,289	28.75%	3	0.04%
1960	5,345	70.18%	2,268	29.78%	3	0.04%
1964	3,462	50.67%	3,370	49.33%	0	0.00%
1968	4,651	70.59%	1,673	25.39%	265	4.02%
1972	4,615	71.82%	1,682	26.17%	129	2.01%
1976	4,207	61.79%	2,503	36.77%	98	1.44%
1980	4,730	65.90%	1,990	27.73%	457	6.37%
1984	4,570	66.00%	2,323	33.55%	31	0.45%
1988	3,523	57.32%	2,593	42.19%	30	0.49%
1992	3,209	44.96%	2,548	35.70%	1,380	19.34%
1996	3,036	45.78%	3,061	46.16%	534	8.05%
2000	3,837	57.06%	2,735	40.68%	152	2.26%
2004	4,417	59.09%	3,001	40.15%	57	0.76%
2008	3,700	51.63%	3,364	46.94%	102	1.42%
2012	4,106	54.42%	3,329	44.12%	110	1.46%
2016	4,921	65.50%	2,157	28.71%	435	5.79%
2020	5,542	68.44%	2,424	29.93%	132	1.63%
2024	5,784	71.89%	2,144	26.65%	118	1.47%

== See also ==
- National Register of Historic Places listings in Butler County, Iowa
