= National Register of Historic Places listings in Henry County, Iowa =

Location of Henry County in Iowa

This is a list of the National Register of Historic Places listings in Henry County, Iowa.

This is intended to be a complete list of the properties and districts on the National Register of Historic Places in Henry County, Iowa, United States. Latitude and longitude coordinates are provided for many National Register properties and districts; these locations may be seen together in a map.

There are 53 properties and districts listed on the National Register in the county.

This National Park Service list is complete through NPS recent listings posted March 21, 2025.

== Current listings ==
	Name on the Register	Image	Date listed	Location	City or town	Description
1	G. W. S. Allen House	G. W. S. Allen House	April 11, 1985 (#85000721)	207 E. Henry St. 40°58′08″N 91°33′00″W	Mount Pleasant	
2	Henry Ambler House	Henry Ambler House	April 10, 1986 (#86000717)	405 Broadway; 40°58′13″N 91°33′17″W	Mount Pleasant	
3	Dr. J.O. and Catherine Ball House	Dr. J.O. and Catherine Ball House	May 18, 1994 (#94000404)	500 W. Monroe St. 40°58′01″N 91°33′31″W	Mount Pleasant	
4	John and Lavina Bangs House	John and Lavina Bangs House	August 28, 2003 (#03000831)	2759 Old Highway 24; 40°54′52″N 91°22′46″W	New London	
5	Benjamin Chapel and Richwoods Cemetery	Benjamin Chapel and Richwoods Cemetery	October 23, 2015 (#15000746)	1936 Franklin Ave. 41°02′07″N 91°37′13″W	Trenton	
6	Bicksler Block	Bicksler Block	May 28, 2010 (#10000291)	101-103 West Cherry St. 40°51′17″N 91°37′17″W	Salem	
7	Hugh and Matilda Boyle House and Cemetery Historic District		October 23, 2015 (#15000747)	3225 Lexington Ave. 40°50′59″N 91°30′06″W	Lowell	
8	Brazelton House	Brazelton House	January 27, 1983 (#83000366)	401 N. Main St. 40°58′12″N 91°33′10″W	Mount Pleasant	
9	Brazelton House Hotel	Brazelton House Hotel	September 22, 1986 (#86002700)	100 N. Main St. 40°57′56″N 91°33′06″W	Mount Pleasant	
10	Budde-Singer Building	Budde-Singer Building	September 6, 1991 (#91001112)	110 N. Main; 40°58′01″N 91°33′09″W	Mount Pleasant	
11	Camp Harlan-Camp McKean Historic District	Camp Harlan-Camp McKean Historic District	January 2, 2013 (#12001117)	2260 Hickory Ave. 40°58′35″N 91°34′57″W	Mount Pleasant	
12	City Hall	City Hall	September 6, 1991 (#91001120)	220 W. Monroe; 40°58′00″N 91°33′20″W	Mount Pleasant	
13	Collins-Bond House	Collins-Bond House	October 28, 2010 (#10000869)	402 S. Main St. 40°51′06″N 91°37′17″W	Salem	
14	Cook-Johnson House	Cook-Johnson House	May 28, 2010 (#10000292)	3091 Franklin Ave. 40°51′28″N 91°37′19″W	Salem	
15	George and Margaret Cooper House	George and Margaret Cooper House	May 2, 1997 (#97000393)	400 W. Monroe St. 40°57′46″N 91°33′05″W	Mount Pleasant	
16	Joseph A. and Lydia A. Edwards House	Joseph A. and Lydia A. Edwards House	October 23, 2015 (#15000748)	1735 Salem Rd. 40°50′48″N 91°34′40″W	Salem	
17	Farmers Savings Bank	Farmers Savings Bank	May 28, 2010 (#10000293)	101 S Main St. 40°51′17″N 91°37′17″W	Salem	
18	First National Bank	First National Bank	September 6, 1991 (#91001118)	101 S. Jefferson; 40°57′59″N 91°33′17″W	Mount Pleasant	
19	Fish Creek Bridge		May 15, 1998 (#98000524)	Hickory Rd. over Fish Creek; 40°51′14″N 91°34′51″W	Salem	
20	Owen A. and Emma J. Garretson House	Owen A. and Emma J. Garretson House	October 23, 2015 (#15000750)	1878 335th St. 40°49′15″N 91°33′04″W	Salem	
21	Geode State Park, Civilian Conservation Corps Area	Geode State Park, Civilian Conservation Corps Area	November 15, 1990 (#90001673)	County Road X23 east of Lowell; 40°49′59″N 91°23′11″W	Danville	
22	Harlan House Hotel	Harlan House Hotel	November 16, 1987 (#87002019)	122 N. Jefferson St. 40°58′00″N 91°33′15″W	Mount Pleasant	
23	Harlan-Lincoln House	Harlan-Lincoln House	May 25, 1973 (#73000726)	101 W. Broad St. 40°58′18″N 91°32′57″W	Mount Pleasant	
24	Henry County Courthouse	Henry County Courthouse	July 2, 1981 (#81000244)	100 E. Washington St. 40°57′56″N 91°33′12″W	Mount Pleasant	
25	Henry County Savings Bank	Henry County Savings Bank	September 6, 1991 (#91001116)	100 S. Main; 40°57′59″N 91°33′10″W	Mount Pleasant	
26	Holtkamp Round Barn	Holtkamp Round Barn	June 30, 1986 (#86001436)	Off U.S. Route 218; 40°49′17″N 91°34′09″W	Salem	
27	Samuel and Sarah Hulme House		July 3, 2019 (#100004114)	1577 Franklin Ave. 41°04′45″N 91°38′24″W	Trenton vicinity	
28	Charles E. Hult House Summer Kitchen and Wood Shed	Charles E. Hult House Summer Kitchen and Wood Shed	July 15, 1999 (#99000830)	1904 140th St. 41°06′17″N 91°32′39″W	Swedesburg	
29	John Hultquist House	John Hultquist House	July 15, 1999 (#99000828)	105 Park St. 41°06′17″N 91°32′39″W	Swedesburg	
30	Henderson Lewelling House	Henderson Lewelling House	June 21, 1982 (#82002620)	W. Main St. 40°49′42″N 91°41′17″W	Salem	
31	Lamm-Pollmiller Farmstead District	Lamm-Pollmiller Farmstead District	May 28, 2010 (#10000294)	1584 335th St. 40°49′16″N 91°36′21″W	Salem	
32	Louisa Building	Louisa Building	September 6, 1991 (#91001117)	120 S. Main; 40°57′56″N 91°33′10″W	Mount Pleasant	
33	Masonic Temple Theater	Masonic Temple Theater	September 6, 1991 (#91001119)	115 N. Main; 40°58′02″N 91°33′11″W	Mount Pleasant	
34	Masters Building	Masters Building	September 6, 1991 (#91001121)	221 W. Monroe; 40°58′01″N 91°33′20″W	Mount Pleasant	
35	McCandless Building	McCandless Building	September 6, 1991 (#91001111)	115 W. Monroe; 40°58′01″N 91°33′13″W	Mount Pleasant	
36	McClellan's General Store	McClellan's General Store	August 28, 2003 (#03000828)	107 E. Main; 40°55′40″N 91°24′04″W	New London	
37	Mount Pleasant Public Library	Mount Pleasant Public Library	May 23, 1983 (#83000367)	200 N. Main St. 40°56′28″N 91°33′45″W	Mount Pleasant	
38	National State Bank	National State Bank	September 6, 1991 (#91001115)	101 W. Monroe; 40°58′00″N 91°33′11″W	Mount Pleasant	
39	Oakland Mills Bridge	Oakland Mills Bridge	May 15, 1998 (#98000525)	County Road W55 over the Skunk River; 40°56′07″N 91°37′09″W	Oakland Mills State Park	
40	Old Main	Old Main	March 26, 1973 (#73000727)	Iowa Wesleyan College campus 40°58′31″N 91°32′34″W	Mount Pleasant	
41	Peterson Manufacturing Building	Peterson Manufacturing Building	August 29, 1997 (#97000962)	213 W. Main St. 40°55′33″N 91°24′13″W	New London	
42	Pleasant Lawn School Historic District	Pleasant Lawn School Historic District	March 25, 1987 (#87000477)	Off Iowa Highway 218; 41°01′01″N 91°29′39″W	Mount Pleasant	
43	Red Ball Garage	Red Ball Garage	July 15, 1999 (#99000826)	1901 140th St. 41°06′19″N 91°32′39″W	Swedesburg	
44	Isaac and Agnes (Bells) Reeves House	Isaac and Agnes (Bells) Reeves House	October 28, 2010 (#10000871)	209 S. Main St. 40°51′13″N 91°37′17″W	Salem	
45	Christian K. and Margaret (Rich) Schantz House and Carpentry Shop	Christian K. and Margaret (Rich) Schantz House and Carpentry Shop	February 19, 2021 (#100006173)	116 West 2nd St. 41°08′47″N 91°39′38″W	Wayland	
46	Second Baptist Church	Second Baptist Church	November 12, 2014 (#14000906)	407 Saunders St. 40°58′13″N 91°33′28″W	Mount Pleasant	
47	Swedesburg Historic Commercial District	Swedesburg Historic Commercial District	July 15, 1999 (#99000829)	107 Iowa Highway 218; 41°06′16″N 91°32′41″W	Swedesburg	
48	Swedish Evangelical Lutheran Church	Swedish Evangelical Lutheran Church	July 15, 1999 (#99000827)	1897 140th St. 41°06′19″N 91°32′43″W	Swedesburg	
49	Timmerman-Burd Building	Timmerman-Burd Building	September 6, 1991 (#91001113)	118 S. Main; 40°57′57″N 91°33′10″W	Mount Pleasant	
50	Union Block	Union Block	September 6, 1991 (#91001110)	109-113 W. Monroe; 40°57′56″N 91°33′13″W	Mount Pleasant	On the Most Endangered list of the Iowa Historic Preservation Alliance
51	West Main Street Residential Historic District		October 26, 2023 (#100009485)	301-407 and 302-402 W. Main St. 41°08′50″N 91°39′52″W	Wayland	
52	Paton and Hannah Wilson House	Paton and Hannah Wilson House	October 28, 2010 (#10000870)	1360 280th St. 40°58′32″N 91°33′04″W	Salem	
53	Zuhn Building	Zuhn Building	September 6, 1991 (#91001114)	201 E. Monroe; 40°58′32″N 91°33′04″W	Mount Pleasant	

== Former listings ==
	Name on the Register	Image	Date listed	Date removed	Location	Description
1	Smith and Weller Building	Smith and Weller Building	August 28, 2003 (#03000830)	July 31, 2020	100 E. Main; 40°55′38″N 91°24′05″W	

== See also ==
- List of National Historic Landmarks in Iowa
- National Register of Historic Places listings in Iowa
- Listings in neighboring counties: Des Moines, Jefferson, Lee, Louisa, Van Burnen, Washington
