= National State Bank =

National State Bank may refer to:

- National State Bank (Mount Pleasant, Iowa), listed on the National Register of Historic Places in Henry County, Iowa
- National State Bank (Camden, New Jersey), listed on the National Register of Historic Places in Camden County, New Jersey
