= Second Baptist Church =

Second Baptist Church may refer to:

== United States ==
(by state then town or city)

- Second Baptist Church (Los Angeles), listed on the National Register of Historic Places (NRHP)
- Second Baptist Church (Bloomington, Indiana), listed on the NRHP in Monroe County
- Second Baptist Church (Centerville, Iowa), listed on the NRHP in Appanoose County
- Second Baptist Church (Mount Pleasant, Iowa), listed on the NRHP in Henry County
- Second Baptist Church (Detroit, Michigan), listed on the NRHP in Wayne County
- Second Baptist Church (Columbia, Missouri), listed on the NRHP in Boone County
- Second Baptist Church (Neosho, Missouri), listed on the NRHP in Newton County
- Second Baptist Church of Dover, Dover Plains, New York, listed on the NRHP in Dutchess County
- Second Baptist Church (Poughkeepsie, New York), listed on the NRHP in Dutchess County
- Second Baptist Church (Columbus, Ohio)
- Second Baptist Church (Mechanicsburg, Ohio), listed on the NRHP in Champaign County
- Second Baptist Church (Sandusky, Ohio), listed on the NRHP in Erie County
- Second Baptist Church Houston, a megachurch in Harris County, Texas
- Second Baptist Church (Richmond, Virginia)
- Second Baptist Church (Washington, D.C.)

== See also ==
- First Baptist Church (disambiguation)
- Third Baptist Church (disambiguation)
