= Garretson House =

Garretson House may refer to:

- Owen A. and Emma J. Garretson House, Salem, Iowa, listed on the NRHP in Henry County
- Peter Garretson House, Fairlawn, New Jersey, listed on the NRHP in Bergen County
- Van Allen–Garretson House, Totowa, New Jersey, listed on the NRHP in Passaic County
- Wyckoff–Garretson House, Somerset, New Jersey, listed on the NRHP in Somerset County
