= Jackson Township, Henry County, Iowa =

Township in Henry County, Iowa, U.S.

Coordinates: 40°51′N 91°33′W

Jackson Township is a township in Henry County, Iowa, USA.

== Demographics ==
As of the 2019 American Community Survey, Jackson Township had a population of 549 and 244 housing units. Its residents were 98.7% white and 1.3% Asian.

== History ==
Jackson Township was first settled in 1836 by James Richie. One of the main early industries was fruit farming, and many early residents were Quakers. Boylestown Bridge, one of the three remaining camelback truss bridges in Iowa, is partially located in Jackson Township. The Joseph A. and Lydia A. Edwards House is located in Jackson Township.

== Geography ==
Jackson Township has a maximum elevation of 597 feet above sea level and a minimum elevation of 182 feet above sea level. The Skunk River runs through Jackson Township.
