= Paton and Hannah Wilson House =

Historic house in Iowa, United States

- U.S. National Register of Historic Places
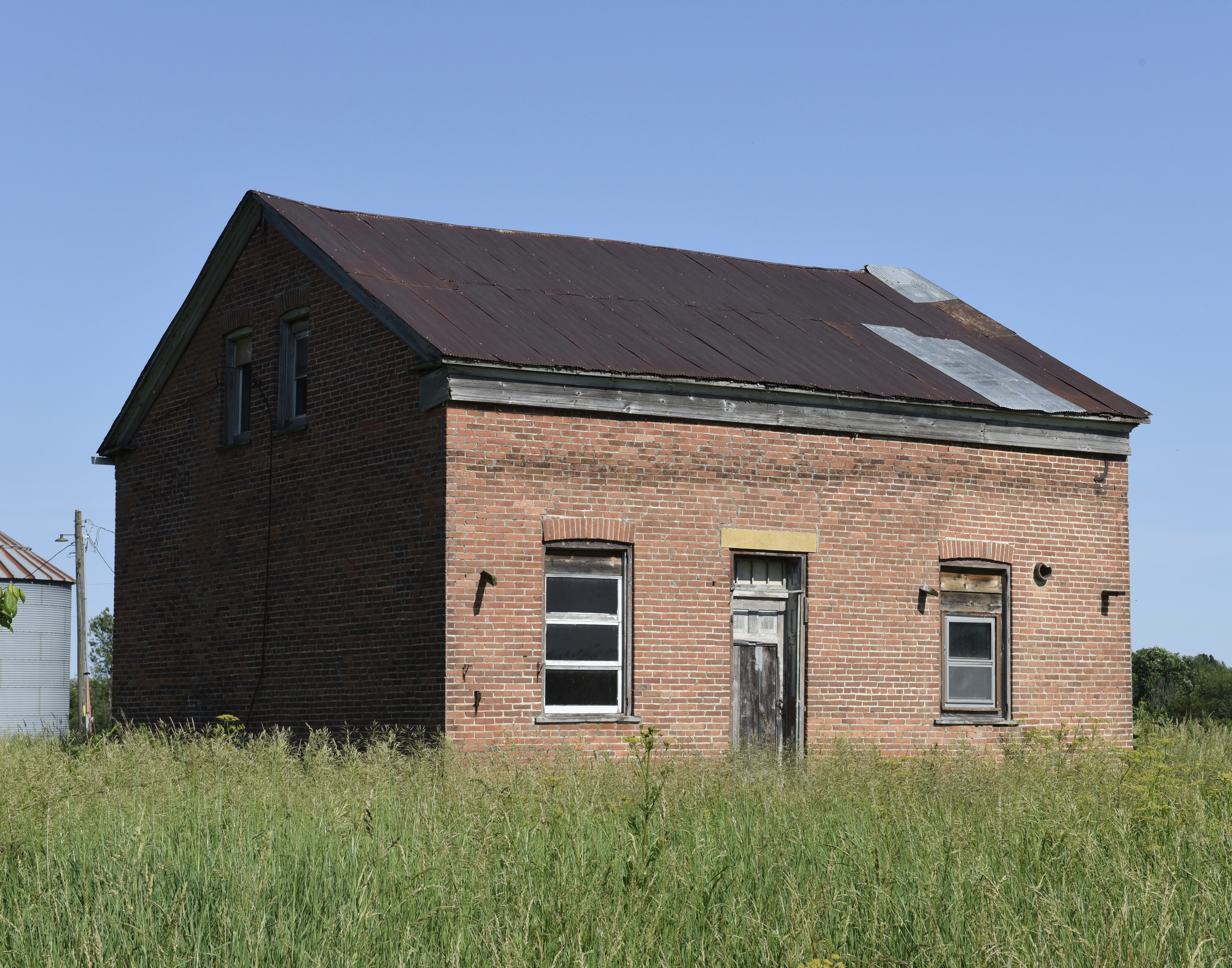

- Location within Iowa Location within the United States
- Location: 1360 280th St. Salem, Iowa
- Coordinates: 40°54′5.7″N 91°38′48.2″W
- Area: less than one acre
- Built: 1839
- Architectural style: Greek Revival
- NRHP reference No.: 10000870
- Added to NRHP: October 28, 2010

The Paton and Hannah Wilson House is a historic building located north of Salem, Iowa, United States. Built by 1839, this single story Greek Revival is one of the oldest brick residences in Salem Township. Paton, or Payton, served in both the Iowa territorial legislature (1840-1842) and the Iowa state legislature (1850-1852). He advocated for the rights of all people, including citizens of color. Hannah was a charter member of Salem Monthly Meeting (Quakers). The Wilson's estate sold the house to Reuben and Abigail Hallowell in 1875, and their descendants continued to own it into the 21st century. The house was listed on the National Register of Historic Places in 2010.
