= Budde–Singer Building =

- U.S. National Register of Historic Places
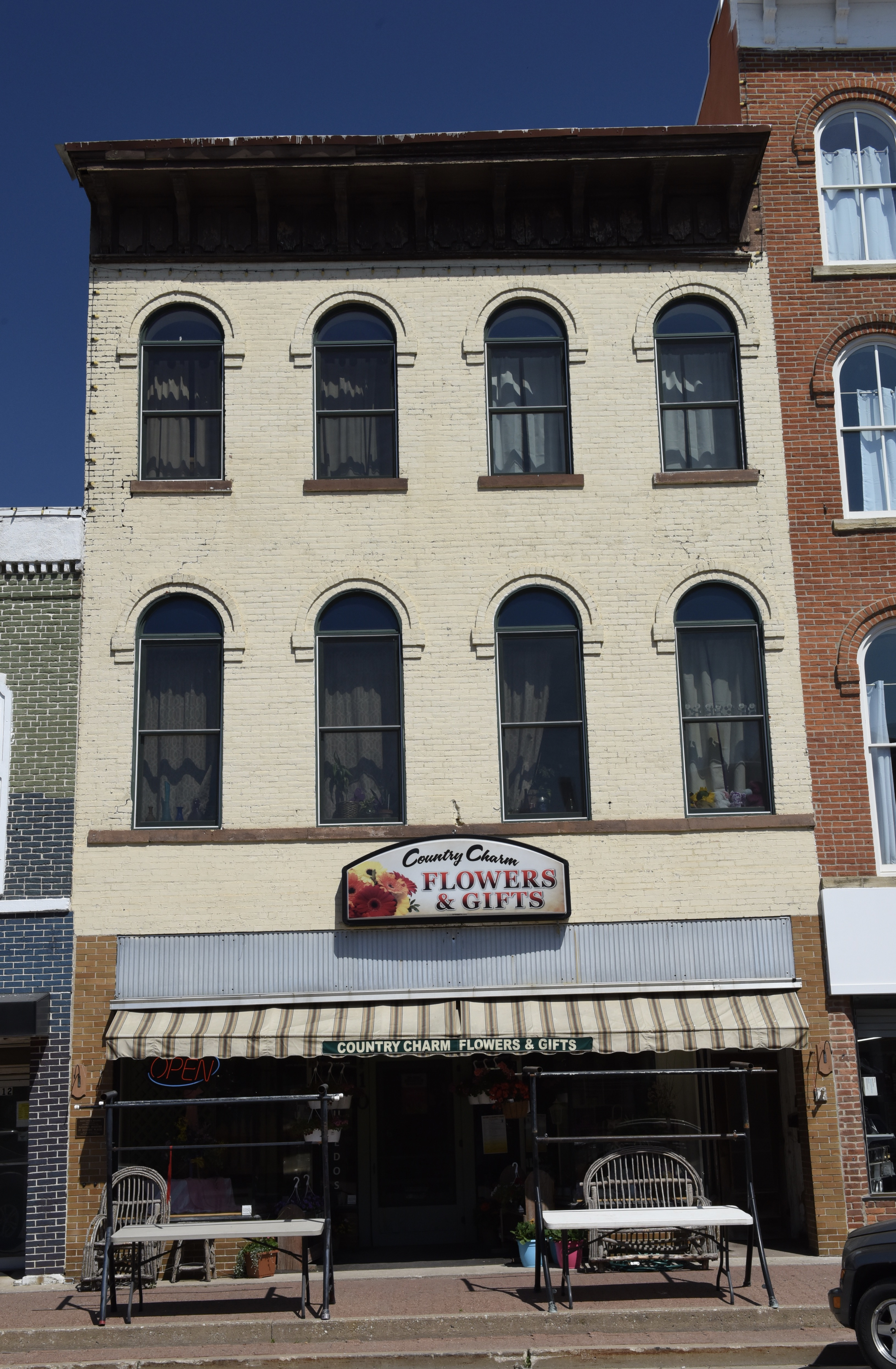

- Location within Iowa Location within the United States
- Location: 110 N. Main St. Mount Pleasant, Iowa
- Coordinates: 40°58′0.8″N 91°33′10.1″W
- Area: less than one acre
- Built: 1882
- Architectural style: Italianate
- MPS: Mount Pleasant MPS
- NRHP reference No.: 91001112
- Added to NRHP: September 6, 1991

The Budde–Singer Building is a historic building located in Mount Pleasant, Iowa, United States. This three story, brick Italianate structure was built in 1882. It replaced a similar building that had been built in 1856 and destroyed in a fire. Its early Italianate style is unusual for this time period, but it fits into its streetscape with similarly designed buildings, including the neighboring Brazelton House Hotel. The Budde–Singer Building features round arched windows with brick patterned hoodmolds on the second and third floors, and a bracketed wooden cornice. The first floor storefront has been somewhat altered, and the exterior of the building has been painted since about 1909. It was listed on the National Register of Historic Places in 1991.
