= Isaac and Agnes (Bells) Reeves House =

Historic house in Iowa, United States

- U.S. National Register of Historic Places
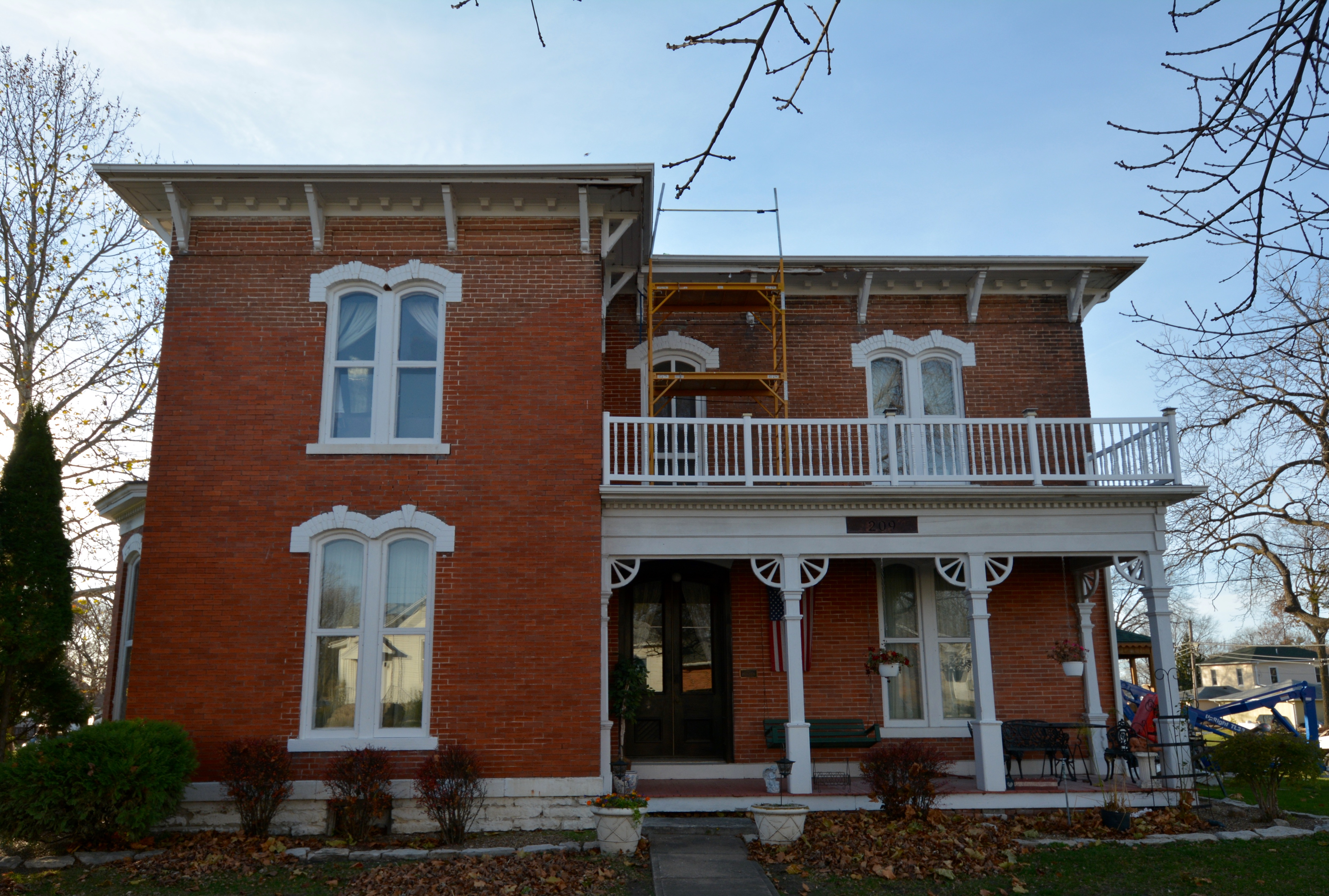

- Location within Iowa Location within the United States
- Location: 209 S. Main St. Salem, Iowa
- Coordinates: 40°51′10.4″N 91°37′18.1″W
- Area: less than one acre
- Built: 1883
- Architectural style: Italianate
- NRHP reference No.: 10000871
- Added to NRHP: October 28, 2010

The Isaac and Agnes (Bells) Reeves House is a historic building located in Salem, Iowa, United States. The Reeves had this house built in 1883, and they continued to live here until they relocated to Keokuk in 1891 where Isaac opened a drugstore. The two-story, L-shaped, brick structure is a noteworthy example of Italianate architecture. It was owned by numerous people after the Reeves, including William C. Savage who used it as a rental property. One of his tenants was Dr. O.E. Holmes who used it as his residence and to house his medical practice. The front porch was restored in 1989. The house was listed on the National Register of Historic Places in 2010.
