= Brazelton House =

Historic house in Iowa, United States

- U.S. National Register of Historic Places
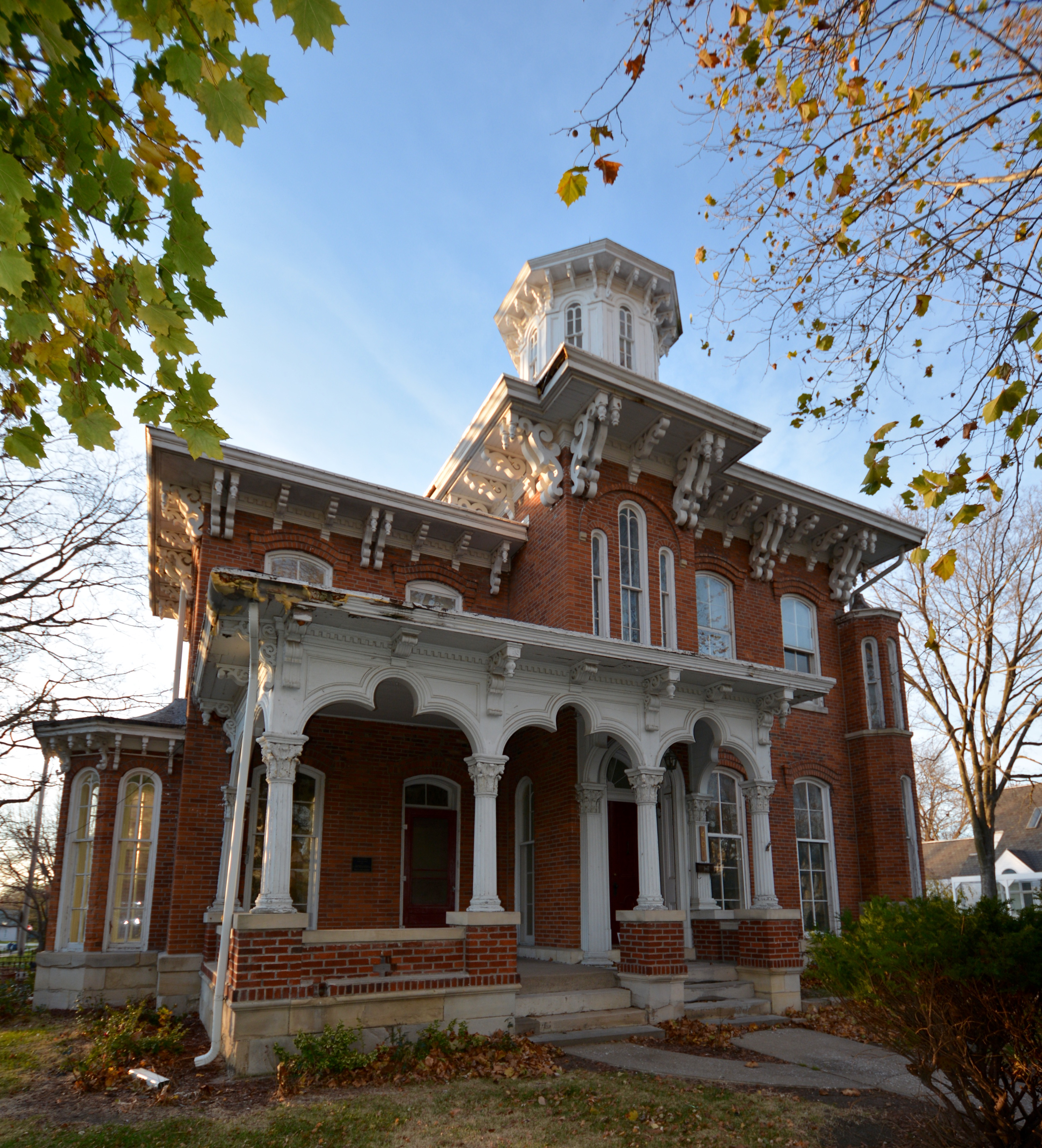

- Location within Iowa Location within the United States
- Location: 401 N. Main St., Mount Pleasant, Iowa
- Coordinates: 40°58′11.7″N 91°33′10.3″W
- Area: 0.2 acres (0.081 ha)
- Built: 1858
- Architect: William P. Brazelton
- Architectural style: Italianate
- NRHP reference No.: 83000366
- Added to NRHP: January 27, 1983

The Brazelton House is a historic house located at 401 North Main Street in Mount Pleasant, Iowa.

== Description and history ==
William P. Brazelton was an early leader in the city's development, owning the Brazelton Banking House and the Brazelton House Hotel. His house, built in 1858, is the earliest substantial residence built here, and it is a significant contribution to its domestic architecture. The main form for this two-story brick structure is the Italianate style, however it combines other styles into its design and ornamentation. Moorish elements are found in the front porch, especially in the arches. Romanesque influence is found in the windows of the tower, the two-story turreted bay, and the single-story bay. Under the eaves are found smaller single brackets in between sets large double brackets.

The house was listed on the National Register of Historic Places on January 27, 1983.

The house was most recently sold for $114,000 in November 2011.
