= Oakland Mills Bridge =

- U.S. National Register of Historic Places
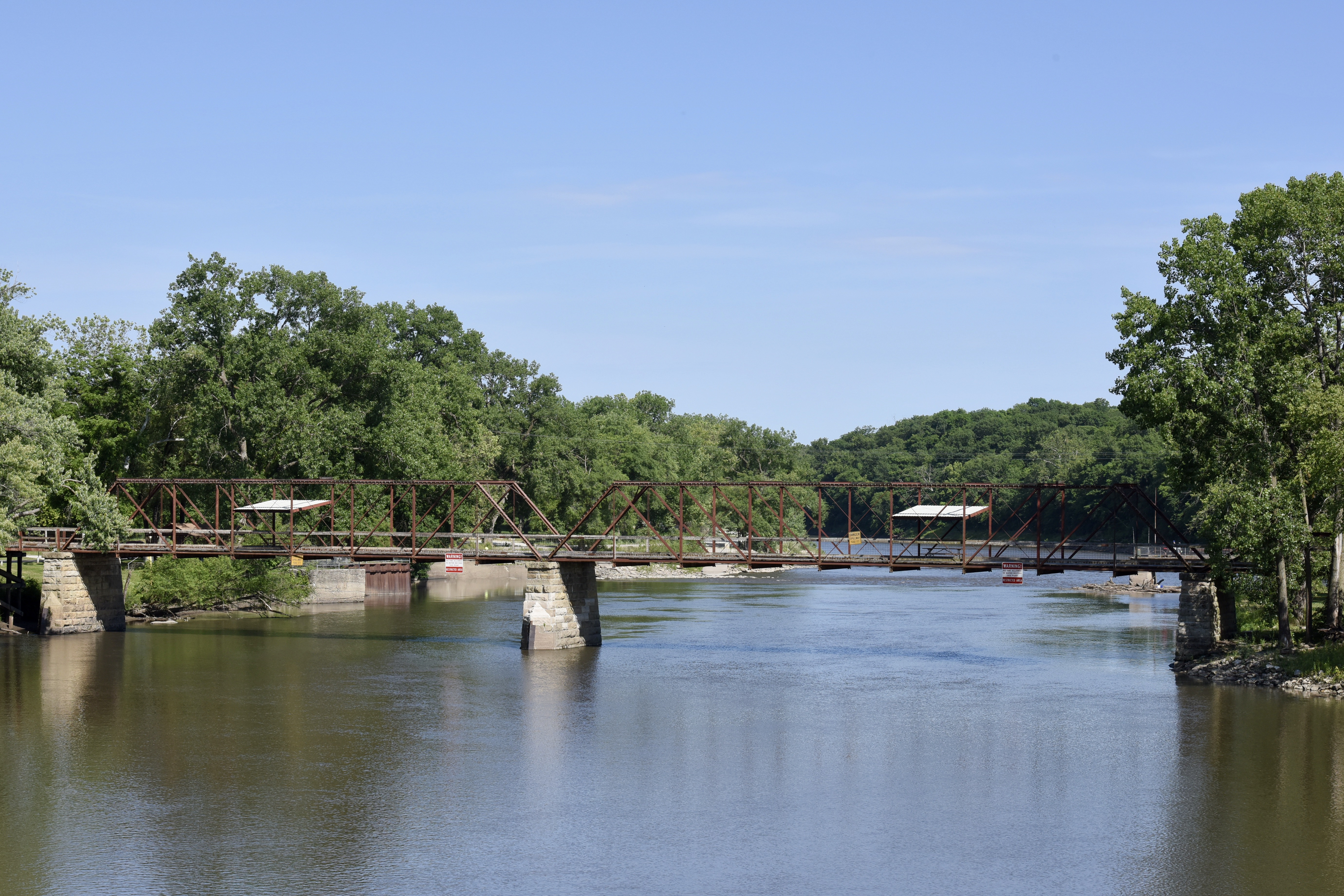

- Location within Iowa Location within the United States
- Location: County Road W55 over the Skunk River
- Nearest city: Mount Pleasant, Iowa
- Coordinates: 40°56′08″N 91°37′01.1″W
- Area: less than one acre
- Built: 1876
- Architect: Missouri Valley Bridge Company
- Architectural style: Pratt truss
- MPS: Highway Bridges of Iowa MPS
- NRHP reference No.: 98000525
- Added to NRHP: May 15, 1998

The Oakland Mills Bridge is a historic structure located in the unincorporated community of Oakland Mills located in Oakland Mills Park southwest of Mount Pleasant, Iowa, United States. The span carried Hickory Road over the Skunk River for 358 feet (109 m). In July 1876 the Henry County Board of Supervisors decided to locate the bridge over the Skunk River at Oakland Mills. After engineers looked over the proposals, they choose the Missouri Valley Bridge and Iron Company of Leavenworth, Kansas to build the structure. The long-span combination Pratt truss through and pony truss was completed later the same year. The steel components where manufactured by the Phoenix Iron Company of Pennsylvania. It is one of the oldest Pratt through truss bridges in Iowa. Long closed to vehicular traffic, it was listed on the National Register of Historic Places in 1998.

== See also ==
- List of bridges on the National Register of Historic Places in Iowa
- National Register of Historic Places listings in Henry County, Iowa
