= Cook-Johnson House =

Historic house in Iowa, United States

- U.S. National Register of Historic Places
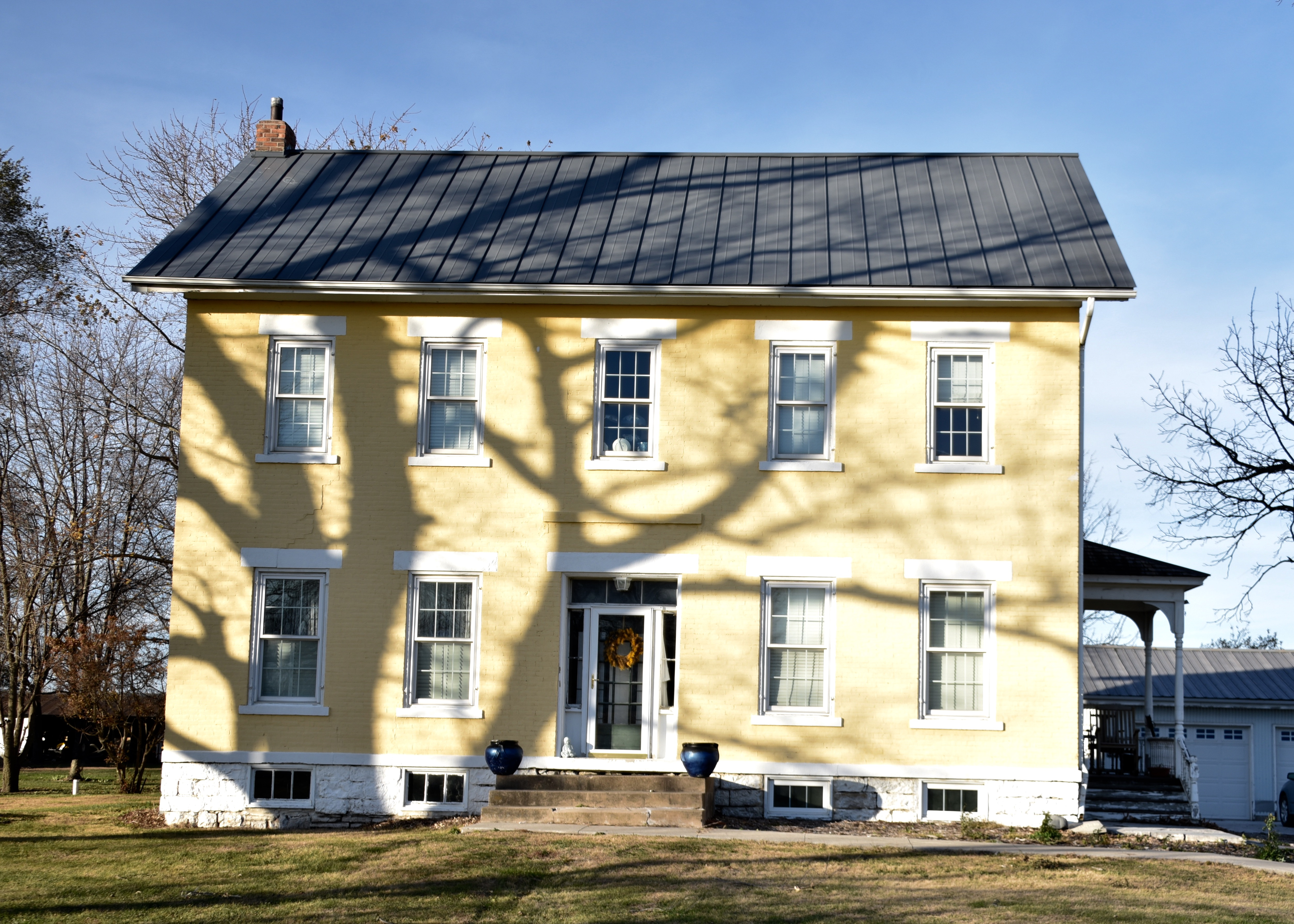

- Location within Iowa Location within the United States
- Location: 3091 Franklin Ave., Salem, Iowa
- Coordinates: 40°51′30.5″N 91°37′21.8″W
- Area: less than one acre
- Built: c. 1850
- Architectural style: Greek Revival
- NRHP reference No.: 10000292
- Added to NRHP: October 28, 2010

The Cook-Johnson House is a historic house located at 3091 Franklin Avenue, north of Salem, Iowa.

== Description and history ==
This two-story brick house, built around 1850 in the Greek Revival style, is attributed to either Jonathan Cook or Henry W. Johnson. Both men were early Quaker settlers in the area. Johnson accumulated wealth, partly through dealings with counterfeit money. Though the extent of his activities remained unknown until after his death, he was ousted from the local Quaker congregation because of it. Wallace Godfrey and Clark Osburn were also implicated in the counterfeiting operation. In 1911, Osburn was discovered to have murdered Warner Davis, who had learned of the illegal activity and intended to report it.

The house was listed on the National Register of Historic Places on October 28, 2010.
