= Bicksler Block =

- U.S. National Register of Historic Places
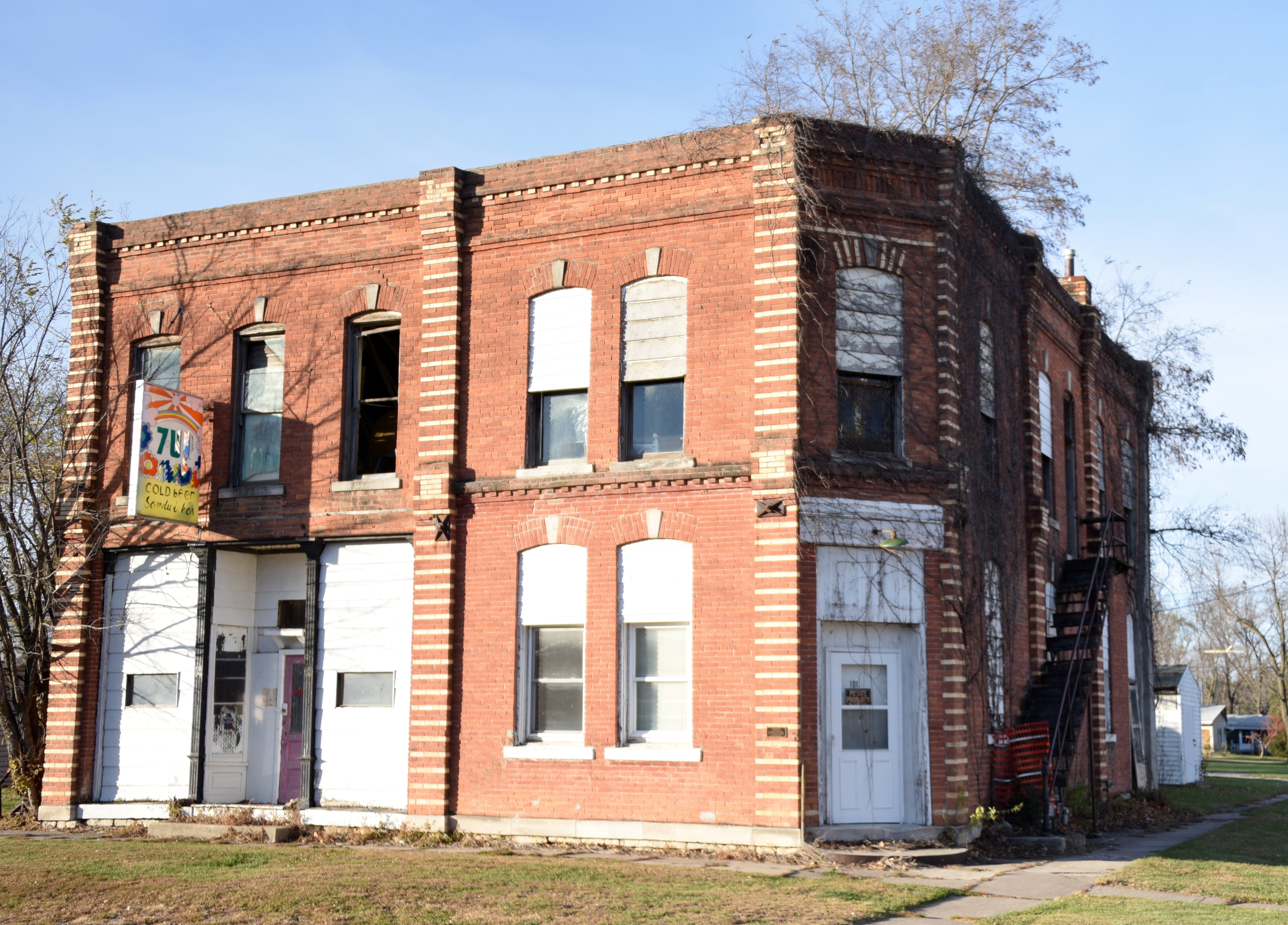

- Location within Iowa Location within the United States
- Location: 101-103 West Cherry St. Salem, Iowa
- Coordinates: 40°51′17.6″N 91°37′17.8″W
- Area: less than one acre
- Built: 1886
- Architect: Whitmore & Levet
- Architectural style: Romanesque Revival; Italianate
- NRHP reference No.: 10000291
- Added to NRHP: October 28, 2010

The Bicksler Block is an historic building located in Salem, Iowa, United States. John Bicksler had this commercial building built in 1886. The two-story, brick structure is a combination of the Romanesque Revival and the Italianate styles. Salem's central business district was plagued by fires from 1886 to 1933. This building was built after the first major fire to effect the town in 1886. The store front on the east side of the building housed a bank into the early 1900s and then the local post office was located here until 1967. The western half of the building has housed a variety of businesses over the years, including: clothing stores, two different milliners, a restaurant, and a pool hall. The second floor housed a variety of offices, including a dentist. The American Legion acquired the building from the Bicksler family in 1950. It was listed on the National Register of Historic Places in 2010.
