= Third Baptist Church =

Third Baptist Church may refer to:

- Third Baptist Church (San Francisco, California), CHL and SFDL-listed
- Third Baptist Church (St. Louis, Missouri)
- Third Baptist Church (Nashville, Tennessee), NRHP-listed
- Third Baptist Church (Washington, D.C.), NRHP-listed

== See also ==
- First Baptist Church (disambiguation)
- Second Baptist Church (disambiguation)
