= Lamm-Pollmiller Farmstead District =

Historic district in Iowa, United States

- U.S. National Register of Historic Places
- U.S. Historic district
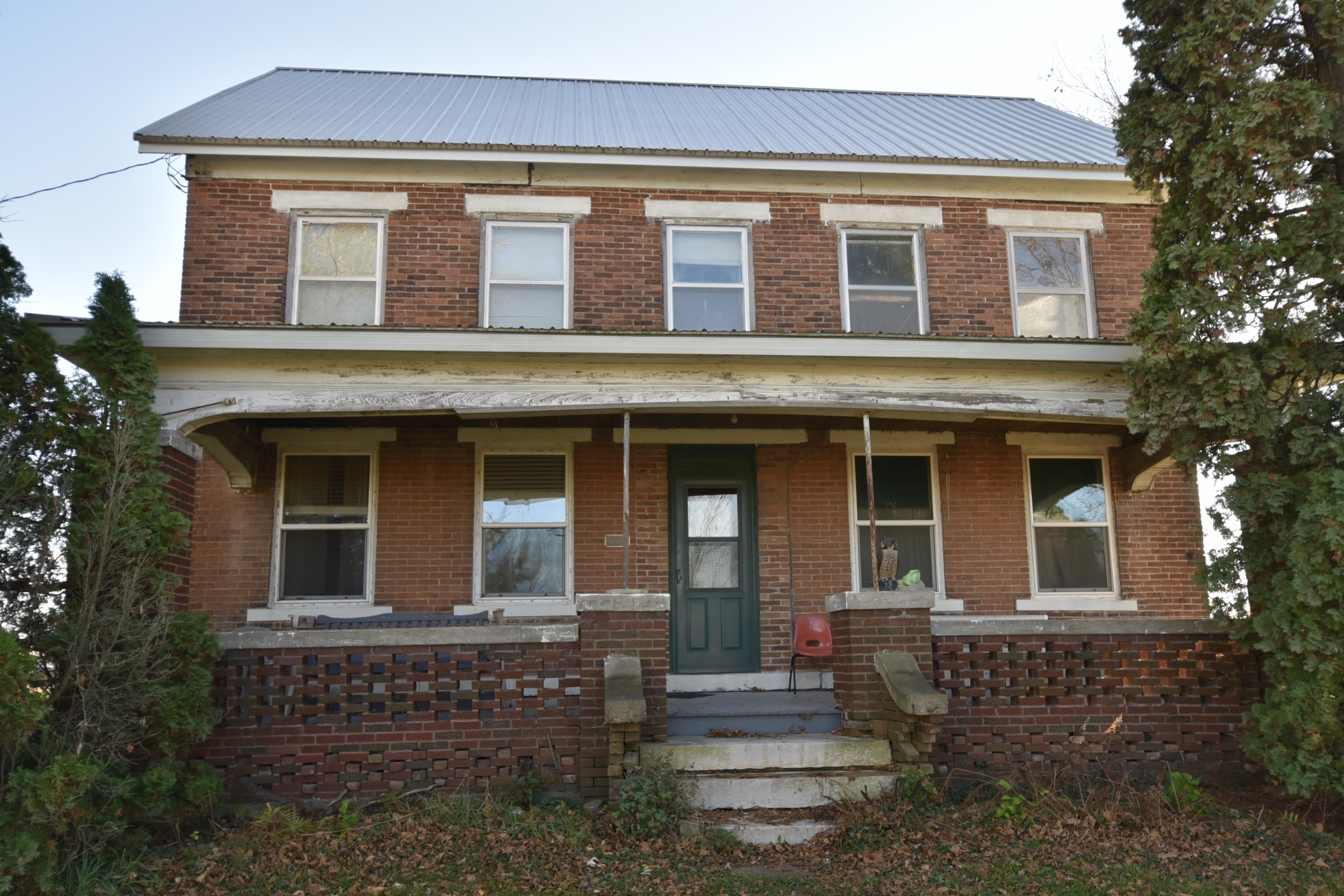

- Location within Iowa Location within the United States
- Location: 1584 335th St. Salem, Iowa
- Coordinates: 40°49′14.7″N 91°36′20.8″W
- Area: less than one acre
- Built: 1843
- Architectural style: Greek Revival
- NRHP reference No.: 10000294
- Added to NRHP: October 28, 2010

The Lamm-Pollmiller Farmstead District is a nationally recognized historic district located southeast of Salem, Iowa, United States. It comprises the farm house and outbuildings that were built by Henry and Elizabeth (Cook) Lamm beginning in 1849. The Lamms were Quakers who settled here from Ohio. The house is a two-story, brick, Greek Revival. The farm is located along the old Military Road that passed along the north side of the property. Local lore said that this was a stage coach stop in the 1850s and the 1860s. The Pollmiller family bought the farm in 1905. The farmstead was listed on the National Register of Historic Places in 2010.
