= Farmers Savings Bank =

- U.S. National Register of Historic Places
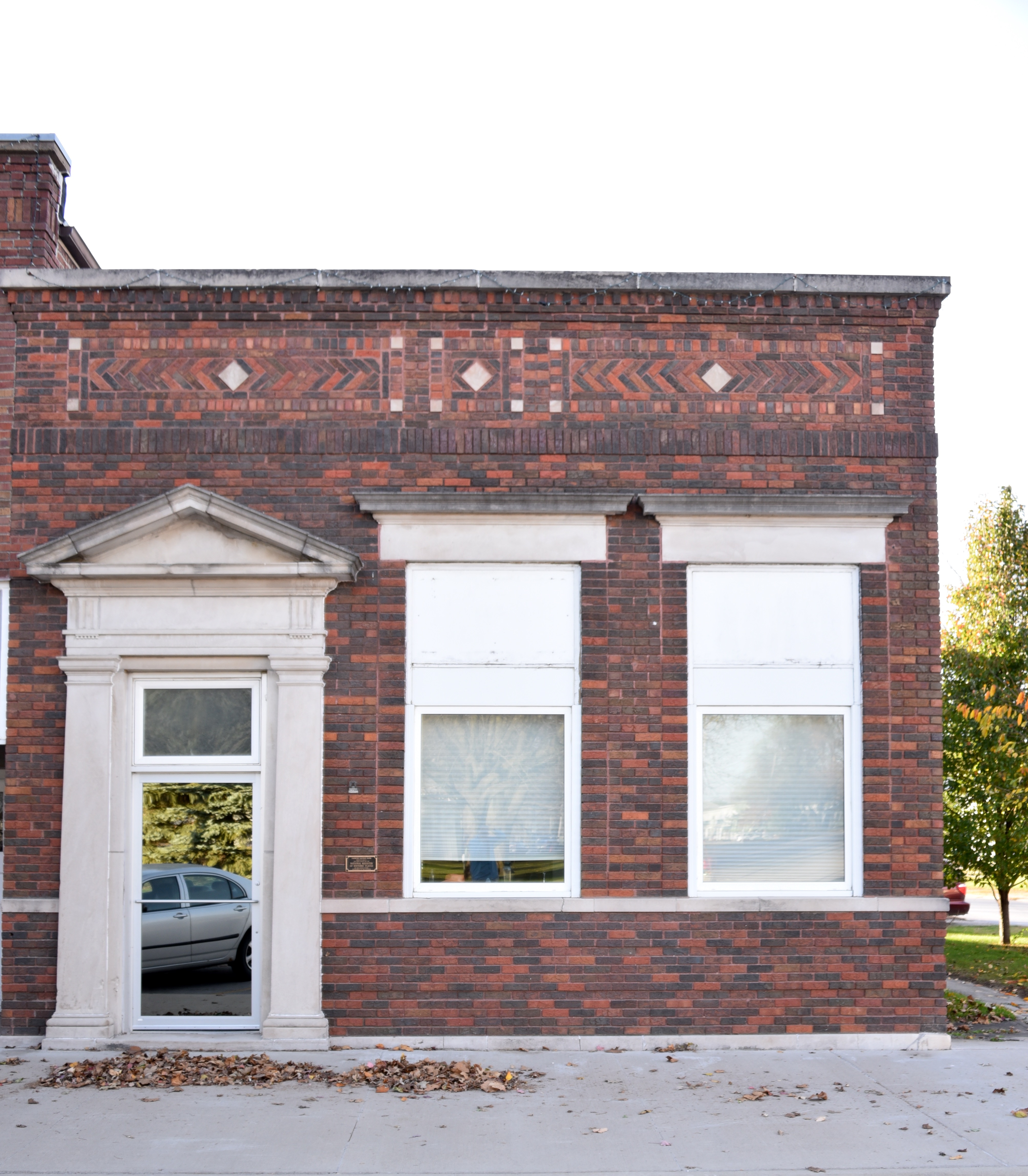

- Location within Iowa Location within the United States
- Location: 101-103 West Cherry St. Salem, Iowa
- Coordinates: 40°51′16.4″N 91°37′17.9″W
- Area: less than one acre
- Built: 1916
- Architectural style: Classical Revival
- NRHP reference No.: 10000293
- Added to NRHP: October 28, 2010

Farmers Savings Bank is a historic building located in Salem, Iowa, United States. Built in 1916, it replaced a building destroyed by fire the year before. The following banks operated here: Farmers Savings Bank (1916-1933), Farmington State Bank (1936-1944), Des Moines Valley State Bank (1944-1955), State Central Savings Bank (1955-1957), Hillsboro Savings Bank (1957-1976), Hawkeye Bank and Trust (1976-1992). In 1992 Hawkeye Bank and Trust donated the building to the American Legion, who sold it to Anthony and Connie Kramer in 2000. They remodeled the single-story, brick, Neoclassical structure for their home. It was listed on the National Register of Historic Places in 2010.

Farmers Savings Bank was one of ten banks in Iowa that was taken over by the state banking department on January 25, 1933, and reopened under a new state law. State Central Savings Bank was robbed in 1955.
