= William Savage (ornithologist) =

English American ornithologist and painter (1832–1908)

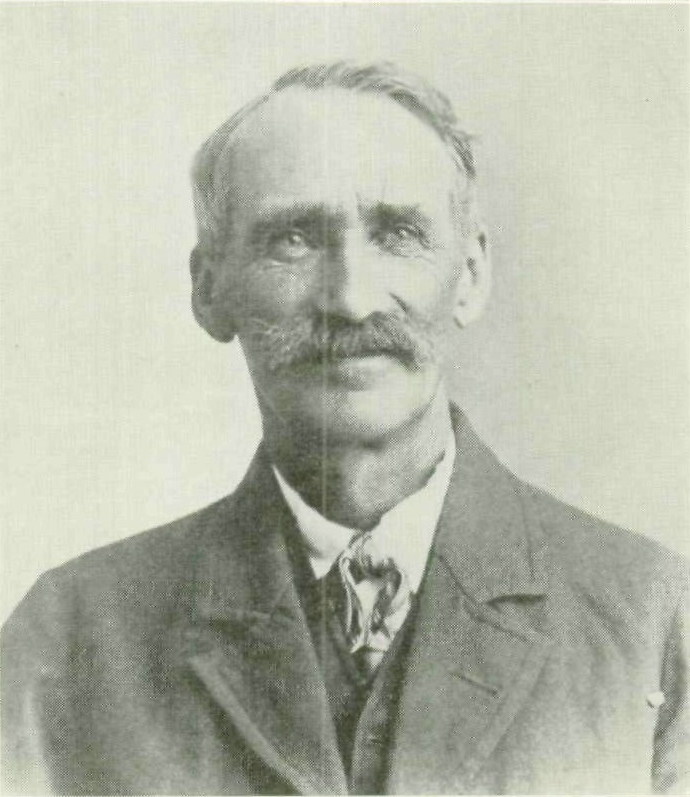
- Born: September 2, 1832; Greens Norton, Northamptonshire, England
- Died: July 7, 1908 (aged 75)
- Occupations: Ornithologist and painter

William Savage (September 2, 1832 – July 7, 1908) was an English American ornithologist and painter. He drew pictures based on birds that he hunted or received and then painted accurate representations of those birds. Much of the recognition for his work happened after his death.

== Personal life ==
William Savage was born on September 2, 1832, in Greens Norton, Northamptonshire, England. After his father died when he was 18 months old, he was raised by his grandmother until Savage was 7 years old. Savage's uncle William Savage, who had the same name, took over guardianship and showed him how to tailor. When Savage was 14 years old in 1846, he and his uncle immigrated to Cayuga County, New York, where Savage attended school, worked on a farm, and did tailoring. In about 1850, New York resident Lancelot Turk encouraged Savage to draw life-size pictures of birds. Savage was paid $1.50 to draw a grass and grain harvester by his employer in January 1854. At the time, Savage's income did not primarily come from his drawings. Savage married Anna Savage, his great uncle Samuel Savage's adoptive daughter, in 1853. Anna Savage had a son named Walter Giles Savage in July 1854. In October 1855, the family moved to Salem, Iowa, where his uncle lived. Their other five children were born on a farm in Salem. Savage attended church meetings and worked to help people who were sick or elderly. He became an American citizen in 1888.

== Career ==
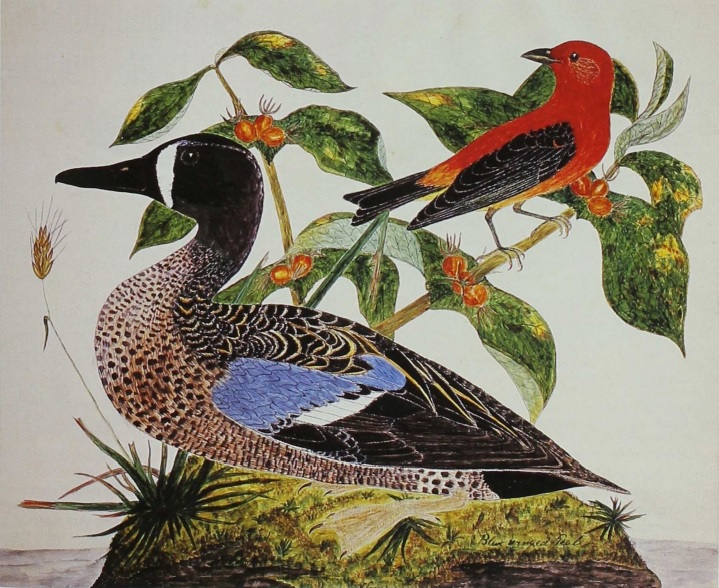
Painting of blue-winged teal and scarlet tanager birds by William Savage

Savage drew pictures of birds shortly after he came to Iowa, including a chewink that he hunted for measurements. He worked as a tailor in the winter of 1855. Starting in March 1856, Savage began keeping a diary that included phrases, daily tasks, and visits with others. Savage helped construct a school on his land and was the director, but he left the position once someone stated that Savage was not an American citizen. He received an income by tailoring and selling animals, along with their fur, eggs, and feathers. The first record in Savage's diary about his bird paintings was on July 30, 1856, in which he wrote "Rain, paint a bird." Savage wrote in his diary, in 1856 to 1871, that he painted two birds each year such as the pileated woodpecker.

=== Technique ===
To begin working on bird pictures, Savage hunted birds or received them from someone else and first outlined them with a pencil, later outlining the bird's feathers, lines, and mass. Savage then measured each dimension and then transferred those dimensions to paper. After wetting his brush with his tongue or water, Savage tested watercolor paints and compared the results with the bird. Originally, Savage made his brushes out of fur from game that he hunted, but he later bought camel-hair brushes. He worked on the steps over several days.

=== Quality and subjects ===
Savage's paintings vary from poor quality to high quality, but his bird paintings were accurate. The birds in Savage's paintings are easy to identify, but some of the bird names are incorrect. He mostly painted southeast Iowa birds such as the Bohemian waxwing, the worm-eating warbler, Nelson's sparrow, and Smith's longspur. Most of his paintings were completed during his final 20 years and people often visited his home to see them. Savage showed his paintings at local fairs and 153 of them were exhibited at the 1907 Iowa State Fair.

== Death and impact ==
Savage died on July 7, 1908. The Des Moines Register said that Savage was a "naturalist, artist, ornithologist of distinction and left for the succeeding generations a rare fund of information about the life of the woods, and a wonderful collection of paintings in natural colors." The article stated that Savage received the highest recognition after his death. In 1908, it was said that Savage's work was the "only collection of this kind in existence". 245 of Savage's paintings are at the State Historical Society of Iowa. Some of Savage's original diary entries are held at the Des Moines Historical Library.
