= Collins-Bond House =

Historic house in Iowa, United States

- U.S. National Register of Historic Places
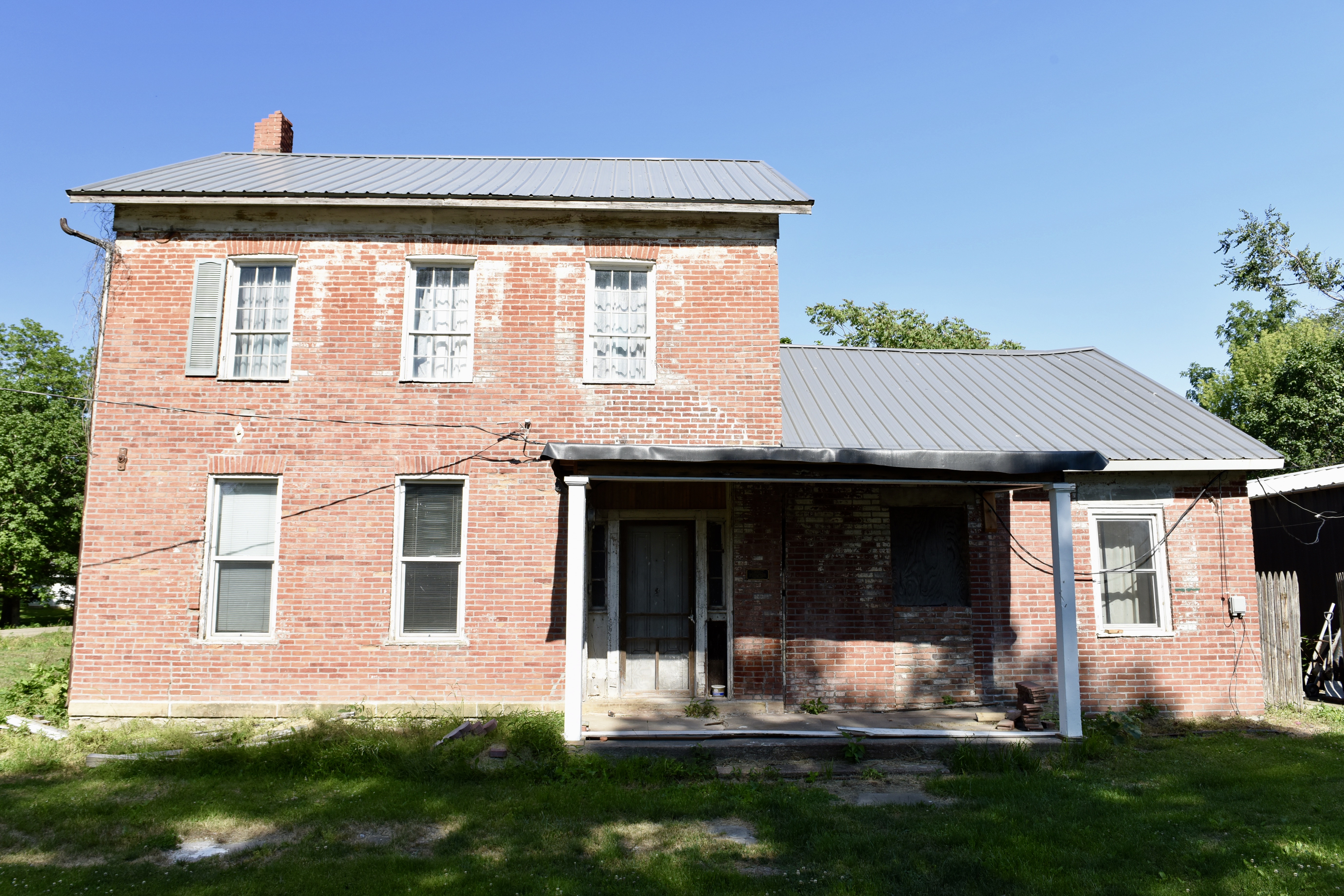

- Location within Iowa Location within the United States
- Location: 402 S. Main St., Salem, Iowa
- Coordinates: 40°51′05.2″N 91°37′16.2″W
- Area: less than one acre
- Built: 1843
- Architectural style: Greek Revival
- NRHP reference No.: 10000869
- Added to NRHP: October 28, 2010

The Collins-Bond House is a historic house located at 402 South Main Street in Salem, Iowa.

== Description and history ==
Peter and Sarah Collins were New York natives who bought this property from William Lewelling in 1842. He built the two-story, Greek Revival style brick house the following year. Salem was a Quaker community and many of its residents were involved in the Underground Railroad. According to his son Mahlon, Peter was a conductor who helped runaway slaves on their escape to freedom. Eli and Mary Bond acquired the house in 1851 after the Collins' relocated elsewhere in Iowa. Their son Titus was married to Peter and Sarah's daughter Amelia. The house remained in the Bond family into the 1940s.

It was listed on the National Register of Historic Places on October 28, 2010.
