= Louisa Building (Mount Pleasant, Iowa) =

- U.S. National Register of Historic Places
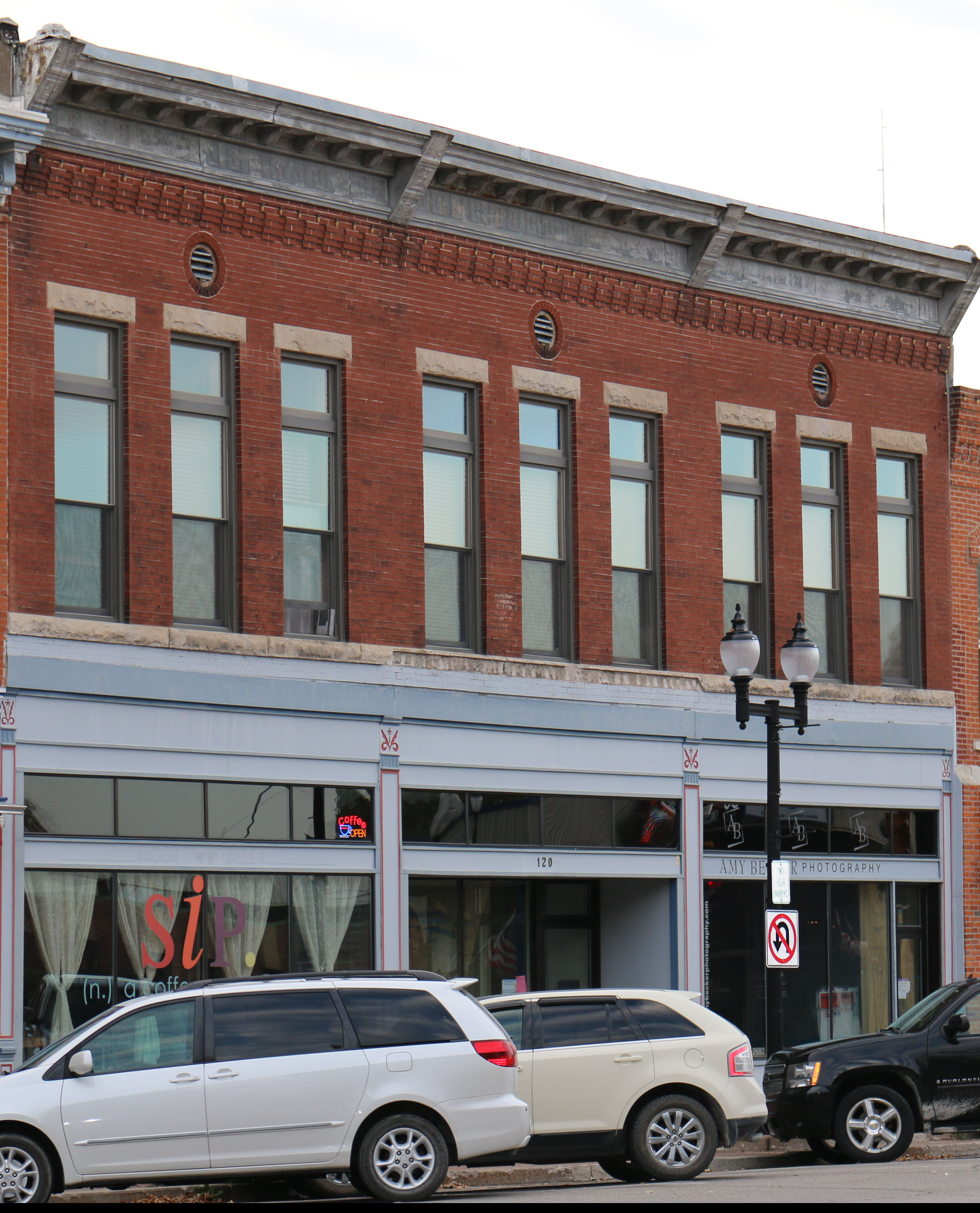

- Location within Iowa Location within the United States
- Location: 120 S. Main St. Mount Pleasant, Iowa
- Coordinates: 40°57′56.5″N 91°33′10.6″W
- Area: less than one acre
- Built: 1901
- Architectural style: Italianate
- MPS: Mount Pleasant MPS
- NRHP reference No.: 91001117
- Added to NRHP: September 6, 1991

The Louisa Building is a historic building located in Mount Pleasant, Iowa, United States. Completed in 1901, this two-story, brick structure features a transitional design between the Italianate, that had been popular here, and the Neoclassical that would replace it in popularity. It has a triple storefront with three sets of three windows on the second floor. In place of hood molds, which were typical of the Italianate, each window has a heavy rusticated stone lintel. The metal cornice across the top of the facade is simpler in its decorative elements than earlier Italianate cornices. This building replaced the Ambler Block, which had been destroyed in an 1882 fire. The lot had remained empty in the intervening years. The building was listed on the National Register of Historic Places in 1991.
