= Pleasant Lawn School Historic District =

Historic district in Iowa, United States

- U.S. National Register of Historic Places
- U.S. Historic district
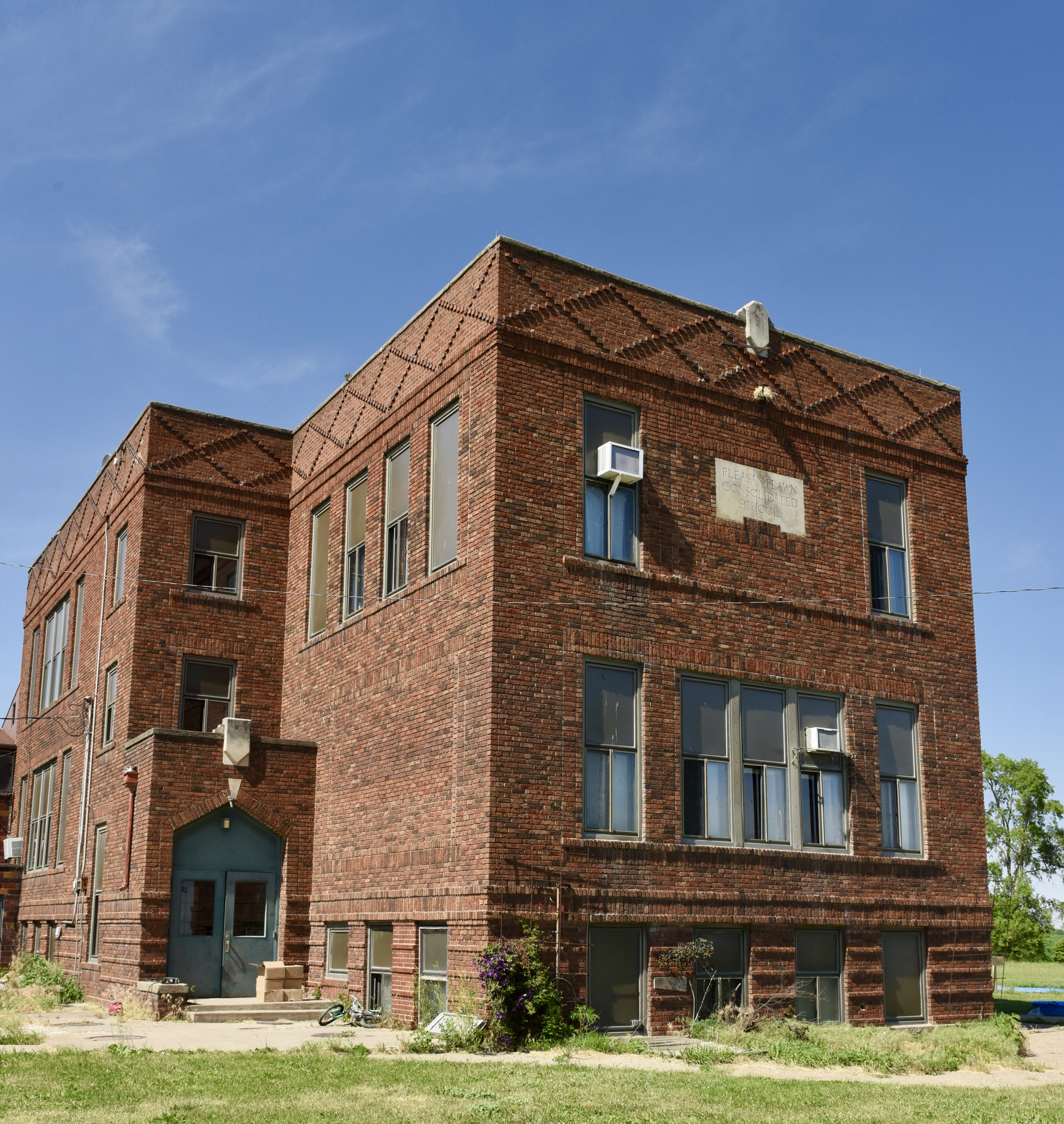

- Location within Iowa Location within the United States
- Location: Off Iowa Highway 218; Mount Pleasant, Iowa
- Coordinates: 41°01′04″N 91°29′44″W
- Area: 3.5 acres (1.4 ha)
- Architect: H.W. Underhill Co.
- NRHP reference No.: 87000477
- Added to NRHP: March 25, 1987

The Pleasant Lawn School Historic District is a nationally recognized historic district located northeast of Mount Pleasant, Iowa, United States. It was listed on the National Register of Historic Places in 1987. At the time of its nomination it consisted of three resources, all of which are contributing buildings. This is the only intact example of a consolidated rural school district in Iowa. It consists of a two-story brick school building (1917), a two-story frame teacherage (1917), and a hack barn. A gymnasium was added to the school building in 1941. The school was still in existence when the buildings were added to the National Register.

Consolidated schools in rural areas were an attempt to increase the tax base and to improve the educational opportunities that were offered by these small public schools. There were about 47 such districts in the state by 1920, and by 1930 there were 89 rural districts. This school was a combination of four school districts: School No. 4 in Marion Township, and Ebenezer, Wesley, and Everett Schools in Canaan Township. Voters approved the consolidation in 1916. While several of these schools were centered around small towns, many were like this one that was located far enough away from town that it was difficult for teachers to get to the schools. A teacherage was built to house them at the school. Students were brought to school in a horse-drawn hack. The barn was used to house the horses during the school day.
