= Dr. J.O. and Catherine Ball House =

Historic house in Iowa, United States

- U.S. National Register of Historic Places
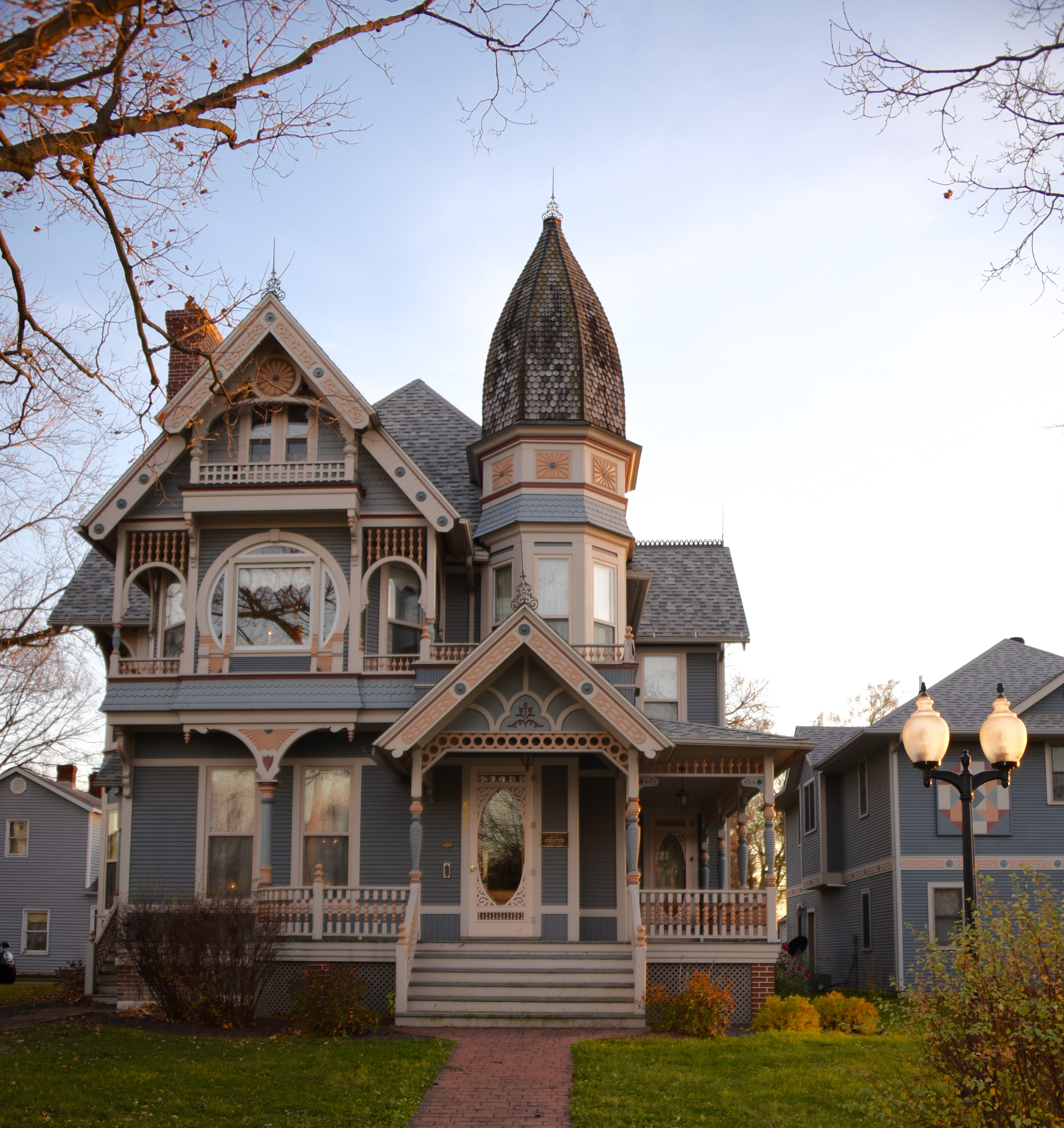

- Location within Iowa Location within the United States
- Location: 500 W Monroe; Mount Pleasant, Iowa
- Coordinates: 40°58′14.1″N 91°33′17″W
- Area: less than one acre
- Built: 1892
- Architect: George F. Barber
- Architectural style: Queen Anne
- NRHP reference No.: 94000404
- Added to NRHP: April 10, 1986

The Dr. J.O. and Catherine Ball House is a historic building located in Mount Pleasant, Iowa, United States. In 1892 this was one of three houses designed by George F. Barber's mail-order architectural firm that was being built in town, and it was the most elaborate of the three. The house is an enlargement of Barber's more expensive plans for design no. 33 from his 1891 book. The 2½-story frame Queen Anne features an irregular plan, a brick-faced limestone foundation, and an octagonal tower with an ogee shaped roof. The circular window on the second story projection is framed with three balconies, one above and one on either side. The wrap-around porch has a projecting gable roof supported by turned columns. A two-story bay window is located on the east elevation. It was also the first house in Mount Pleasant that was totally reliant on electricity for lighting. It was built for Dr. J.O. Ball, a dentist, who was active in civic improvements in Mount Pleasant. The house was listed on the National Register of Historic Places in 1986.
