= Joseph A. and Lydia A. Edwards House =

Historic house in Iowa, United States

- U.S. National Register of Historic Places
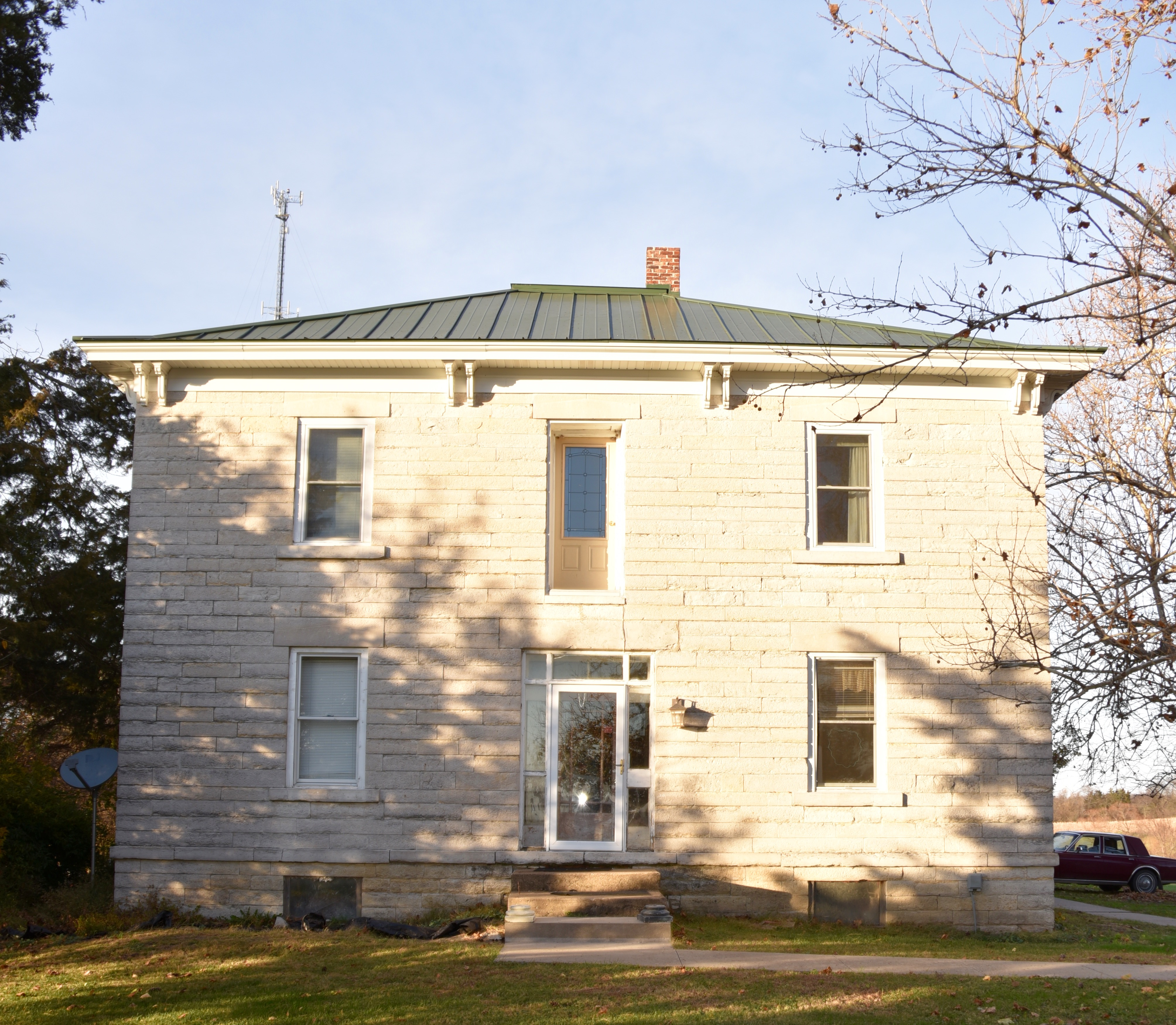

- Location within Iowa Location within the United States
- Location: 1735 Salem Rd. Salem, Iowa
- Coordinates: 40°50′49.4″N 91°34′37.1″W
- Area: 1 acre (0.40 ha)
- Built: 1866
- Architectural style: Italianate
- NRHP reference No.: 15000748
- Added to NRHP: October 23, 2015

The Joseph A. and Lydia A. Edwards House is a historic building located east of Salem, Iowa, United States. This two-story structure is a rare stone building in Henry County, and it reflects building construction from the settlement period of the county. Joseph Edwards acquired this farm in 1841. He initially lived in a house located to the west, and this house replaced it in 1866. The Italianate style residence features a symmetrical facade, flat stone lintels and window sills, a cubical form capped with a hip roof, and a wide frieze with paired brackets. It is believed that the stone for the house's construction was quarried on the north side of the Edwards' farm. The house was listed on the National Register of Historic Places in 2015.
