= Henry Ambler House =

Historic house in Iowa, United States

- U.S. National Register of Historic Places
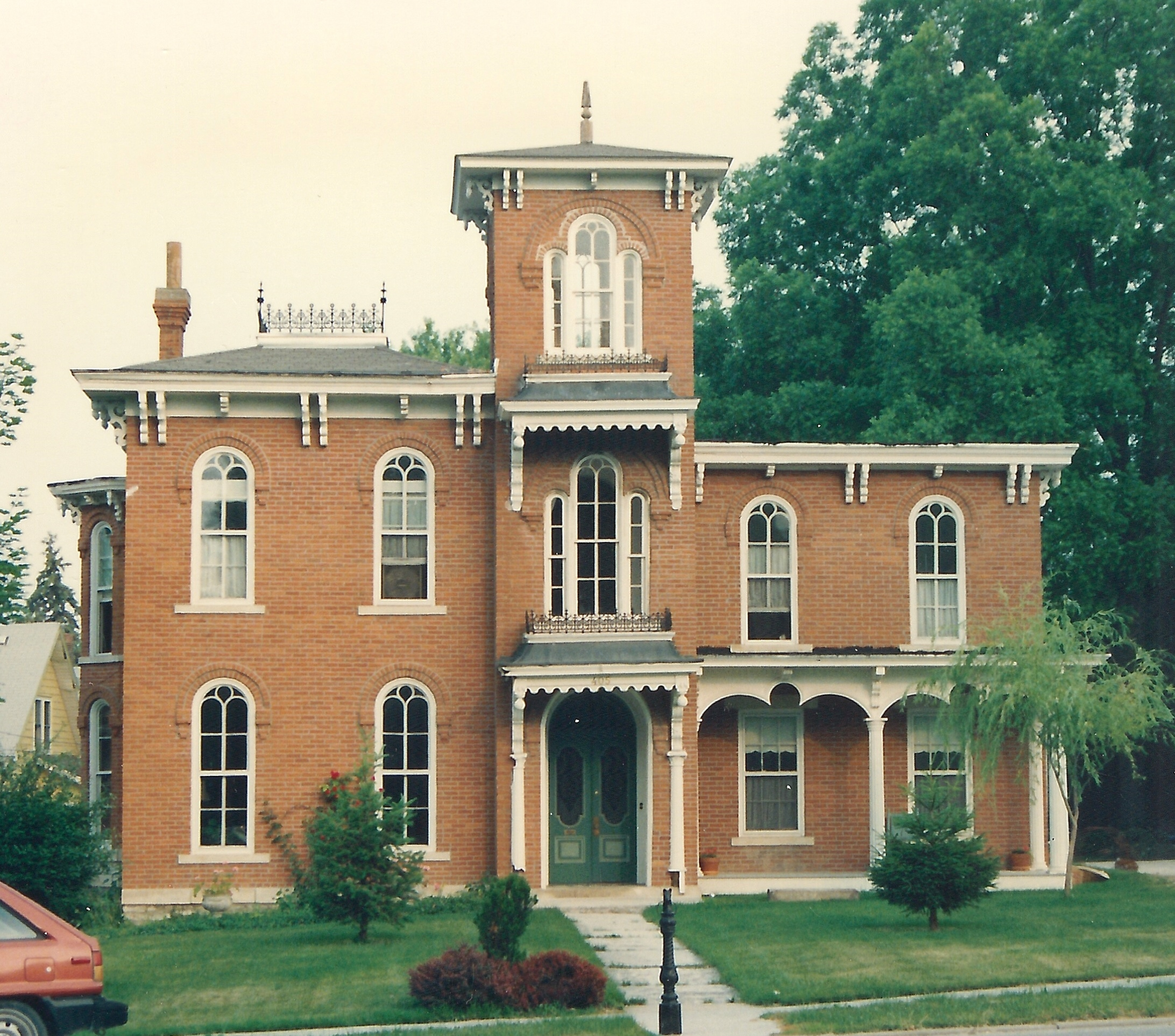

- Location within Iowa Location within the United States
- Location: 405 Broadway; Mount Pleasant, Iowa
- Coordinates: 40°58′14.1″N 91°33′17″W
- Area: less than one acre
- Built: 1868-1869
- Built by: William H. Murphy
- Architectural style: Italianate
- NRHP reference No.: 86000717
- Added to NRHP: April 10, 1986

The Henry Ambler House is a historic house located at 405 Broadway in Mount Pleasant, Iowa.

== History ==
Henry Ambler, a local attorney, bought this property in 1868. There was already a house on it, and Ambler had it altered and additions built. The house shares several details from two earlier Italian Villas built in town in 1858 and 1865. The asymmetrical, two-story brick structure features a three-story tower, bracketed eaves, and a two-story bay window on the south side. Alterations were made in the 1940s, 1954 when it was divided into apartments, and in 1965. The top of the tower was gutted in a fire in 1983 and had to be rebuilt.

The house was listed on the National Register of Historic Places on April 10, 1986.
