= Owen A. and Emma J. Garretson House =

Historic house in Iowa, United States

- U.S. National Register of Historic Places
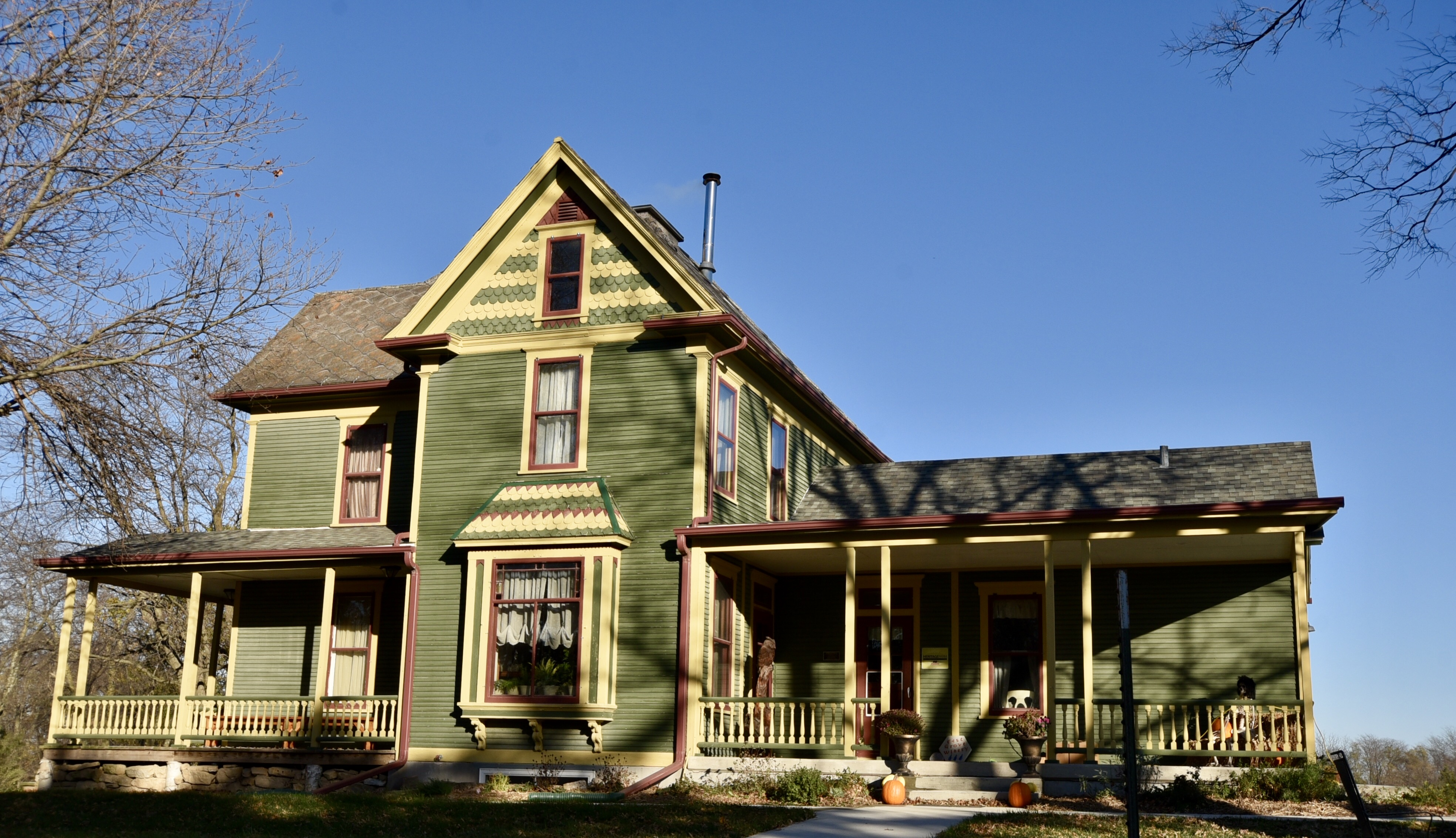

- Location within Iowa Location within the United States
- Location: 1878 335th St. Salem, Iowa
- Coordinates: 40°50′49.4″N 91°34′37.1″W
- Area: less than one acre
- Built: 1901
- Architectural style: Queen Anne
- NRHP reference No.: 15000750
- Added to NRHP: October 23, 2015

The Owen A. and Emma J. Garretson House is a historic building located east of Salem, Iowa, United States. Its significance is derived from its association with Owen Garretson, a local farmer, politician, and historian. His parents, Joel C. and Elizabeth (Goodson) Garretson, were two of the earliest settlers in Henry County, settling here in 1837. The elder Garretson's were opposed to slavery and their farm house was a stop on the Underground Railroad. Owen farmed with his father, and eventually acquired his father's farm. He was involved locally and on the state level with the People's Party, served as a county supervisor, and on the boards of local institutions. Garretson was the president of the Henry County Historical Society, and was a member of the State Historical Society of Iowa. He wrote several articles on the history of Henry County and southeast Iowa that were published in Palimpsest and the Iowa Journal of History and Politics.

The house was built around the turn of the 20th century. The 2½-story frame Queen Anne was built on a limestone foundation. It features asymmetrical massing, fishscale shingled gables with gable returns, a side bay window, cornerboards, window surrounds, and the sunburst gable on the wrap around front porch. The house was listed on the National Register of Historic Places in 2015.
