= Zuhn Building =

- U.S. National Register of Historic Places
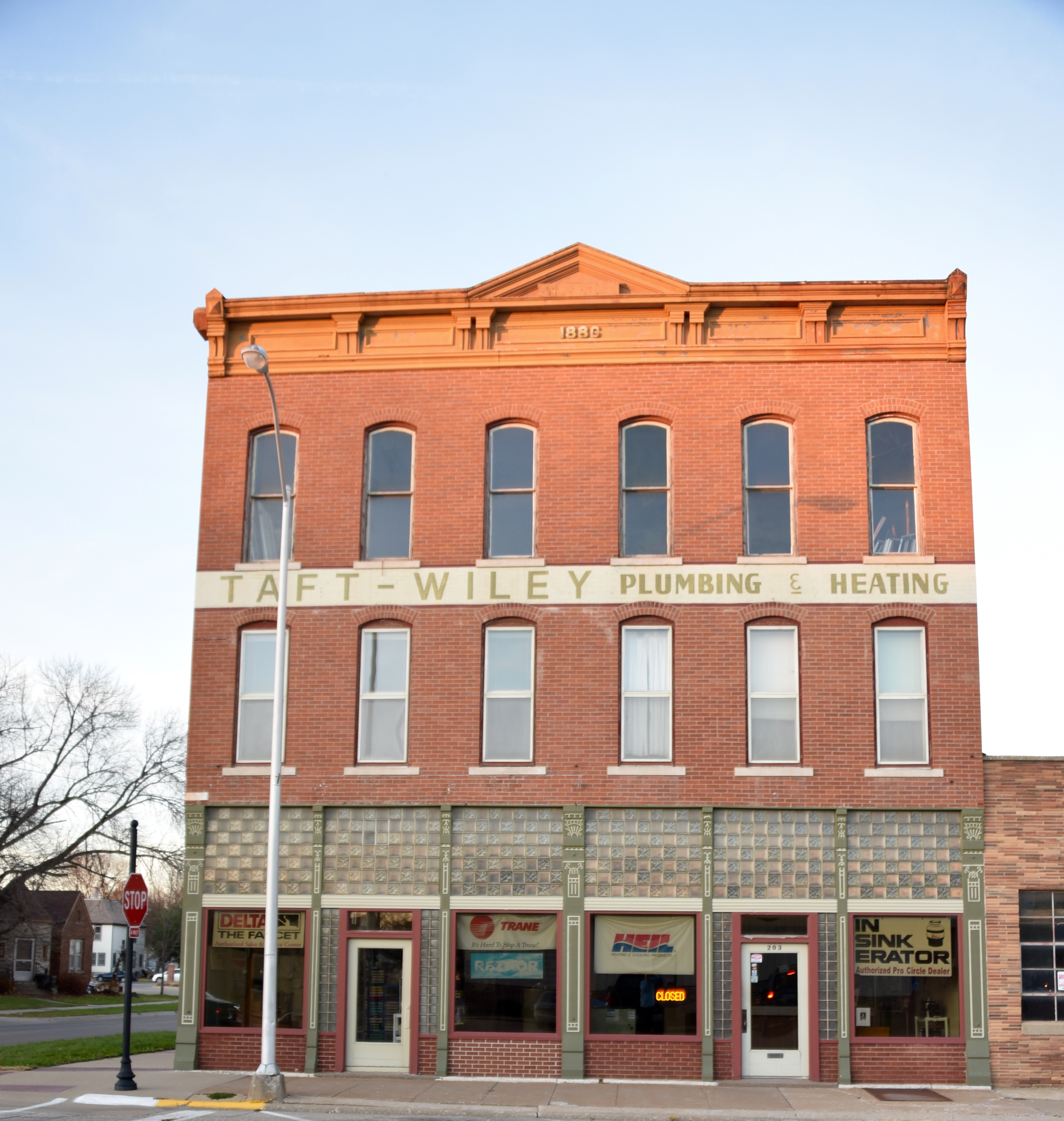

- Location within Iowa Location within the United States
- Location: 201 E. Monroe St., Mount Pleasant, Iowa
- Coordinates: 40°57′59.7″N 91°33′05.6″W
- Area: less than one acre
- Built: 1886
- Architectural style: Italianate
- MPS: Mount Pleasant MPS
- NRHP reference No.: 91001114
- Added to NRHP: September 6, 1991

The Zuhn Building is a historic building located in Mount Pleasant, Iowa, United States. Completed in 1886 a block east of the town square, this three story, brick, Italianate structure replaced a single story building that had housed the Mount Pleasant Carriage Works. H.A. Zuhn had that building torn down and this one built so he could expand his business. He used this facility to manufacture and repair vehicles. The only decorative element of the building is the bracketed metal cornice with date and pediment caps across the top of the facade. The double storefront has been altered somewhat over the years. The building was listed on the National Register of Historic Places in 1991.
