= Samuel and Sarah Hulme House =

Historic house in Iowa, United States

- Samuel and Sarah Hulme
- U.S. National Register of Historic Places
- Location within Iowa Location within the United States
- Location: 1577 Franklin Ave.
- Nearest city: Trenton, Iowa
- Coordinates: 41°04′45.2″N 91°38′25.2″W
- Built: 1862
- Architectural style: Greek Revival
- NRHP reference No.: 100004114
- Added to NRHP: July 3, 2019

The Samuel and Sarah Hulme House is a historic building located north of Trenton, Iowa, United States. The earliest houses in Jefferson Township were log cabins, followed by wooden frame structures, and then brick as the technology advanced. It is unknown who designed and built the 1½-story, vernacular Greek Revival brick house, but there was a brick kiln on Daniel Black's property in Trenton and there were other brick houses built around the same time in the area. The house was built for Samuel and Sarah Hulme, who were newlyweds at the time. Samuel was a gentleman farmer and an active member of the Henry County Institute of Science. The house features stone window sills and brick jack arch lintels. The interior still has its original layout, wood trim, floors, paneled wood doors, and wood stairs and railing. The house was listed on the National Register of Historic Places in 2019.
