= Holtkamp Round Barn =

- U.S. National Register of Historic Places
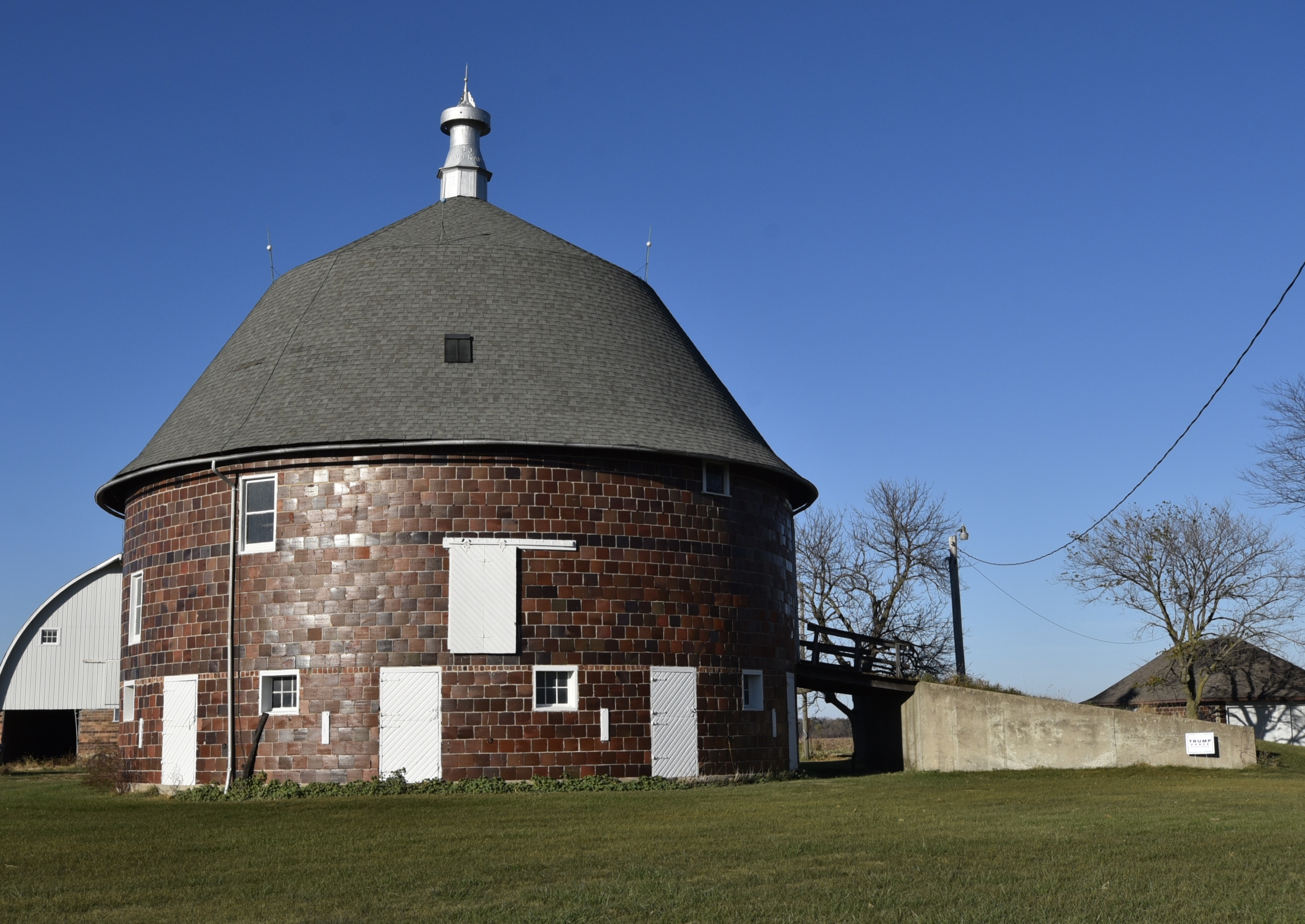

- Location within Iowa Location within the United States
- Location: Off U.S. Route 2181725 335th street.
- Nearest city: Salem, Iowa
- Coordinates: 40°49′16″N 91°33′23″W
- Area: less than one acre
- Built: 1917
- Built by: B.J. Holtkamp
- MPS: Iowa Round Barns: The Sixty Year Experiment TR
- NRHP reference No.: 86001436
- Added to NRHP: June 30, 1986

The Holtkamp Round Barn is a historic building located near Salem in rural Henry County, Iowa, United States. It was built in 1918 by its first owner B.J. Holtkamp who used the plans drawn up by Matt L. King. The building is a true round barn that measures 50 feet (15 m) in diameter. It is constructed of clay tile from Mt. Pleasant Brick & Tile Mfg. Co. of Mt. Pleasant, Iowa and features an aerator, hay carrier, and a two-pitch roof. It has been listed on the National Register of Historic Places since 1986.

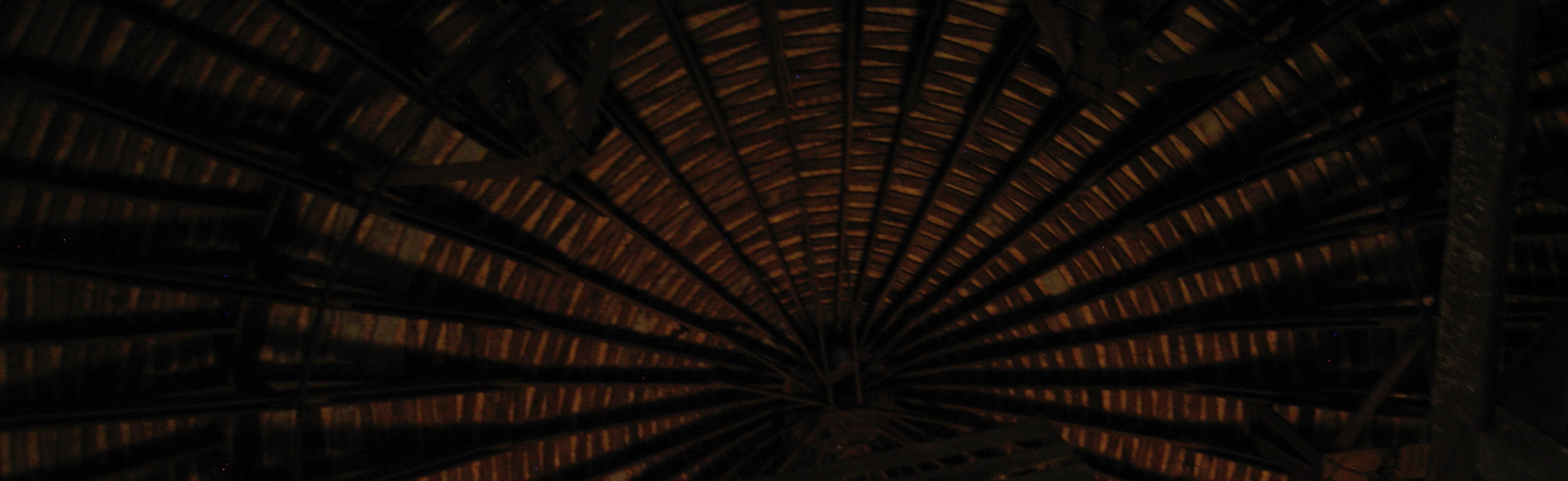
Roof structure from inside the barn
