= Henry County Savings Bank =

- U.S. National Register of Historic Places
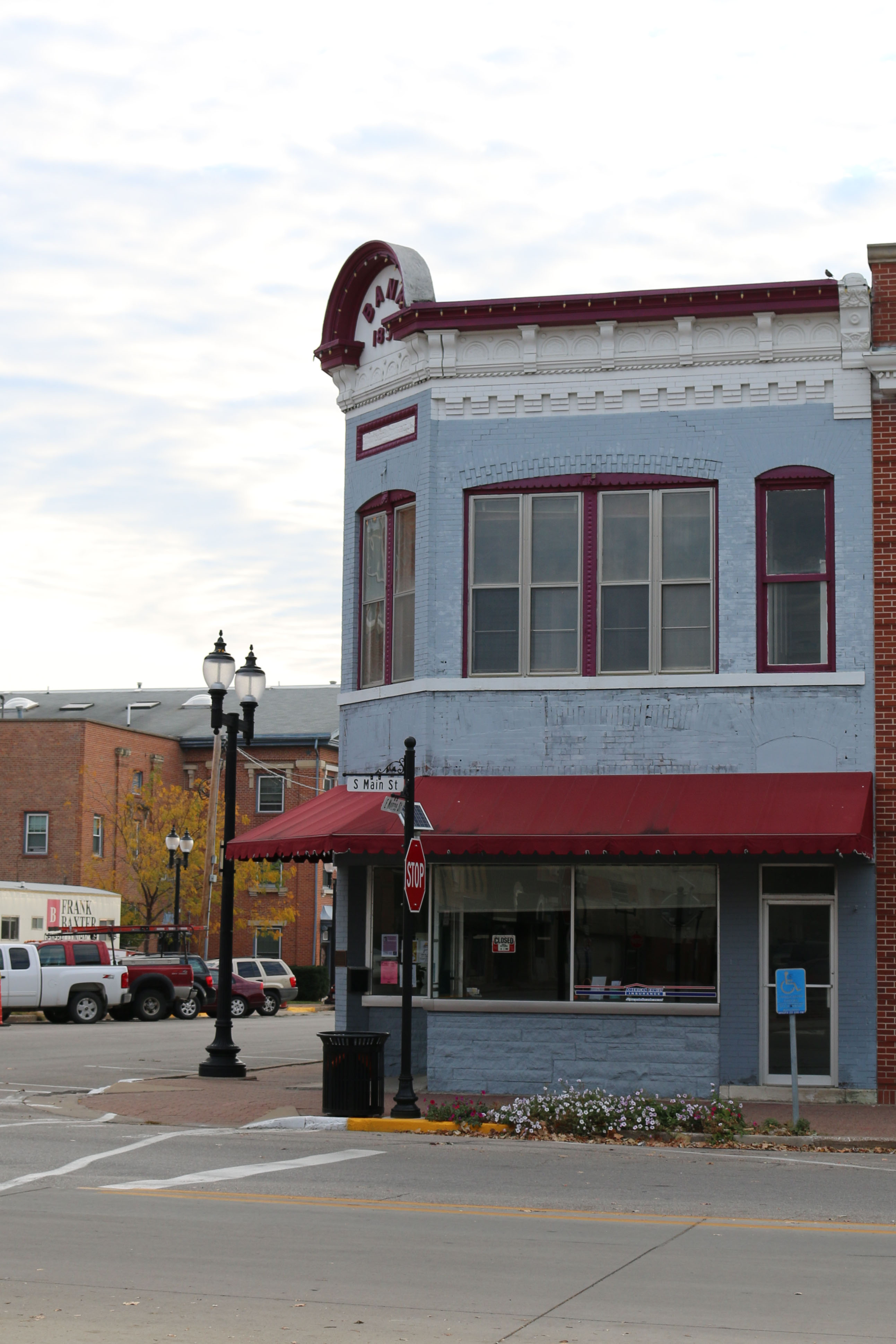

- Location within Iowa Location within the United States
- Location: 100 S. Main St., Mount Pleasant, Iowa
- Coordinates: 40°57′59.2″N 91°33′10.6″W
- Area: less than one acre
- Built: 1891
- Architectural style: Italianate
- MPS: Mount Pleasant MPS
- NRHP reference No.: 91001116
- Added to NRHP: September 6, 1991

Henry County Savings Bank is a historic building located in Mount Pleasant, Iowa, United States. Because this two-story, brick Italianate structure was built specifically as a bank, it features a chamfered corner, which was commonly used to designate a bank in the last quarter of the 19th century. Other features typical of an Italianate commercial building include segmental arched windows, a corbeled brick frieze, and a bracketed metal cornice. The building was listed on the National Register of Historic Places in 1991.
