= Timmerman–Burd Building =

- U.S. National Register of Historic Places
- Location within Iowa Location within the United States
- Location: 118 S. Main St. Mount Pleasant, Iowa
- Coordinates: 40°57′56.9″N 91°33′10.5″W
- Area: less than one acre
- Built: 1883
- Architectural style: Italianate
- MPS: Mount Pleasant MPS
- NRHP reference No.: 91001113
- Added to NRHP: September 6, 1991

The Timmerman–Burd Building is a historic building located in Mount Pleasant, Iowa, United States. The previous building on this lot was destroyed in a fire in 1883, and Henry Timmerman had this building constructed to replace it the same year. The two-story brick structure is one of several building facing the town square in the Italianate style. This building features a single storefront, and four segmental arch windows on the second floor with simple brick patterned hood molds. The bracketed metal cornice at the top of the main facade was mass-produced and likely ordered from a catalog. Burd worked for Timmerman and took over the business. This building housed a shoe store as late as the 1990s. It was listed on the National Register of Historic Places in 1991.
