= Swedesburg Historic Commercial District =

Historic district in Iowa, United States

- U.S. National Register of Historic Places
- U.S. Historic district
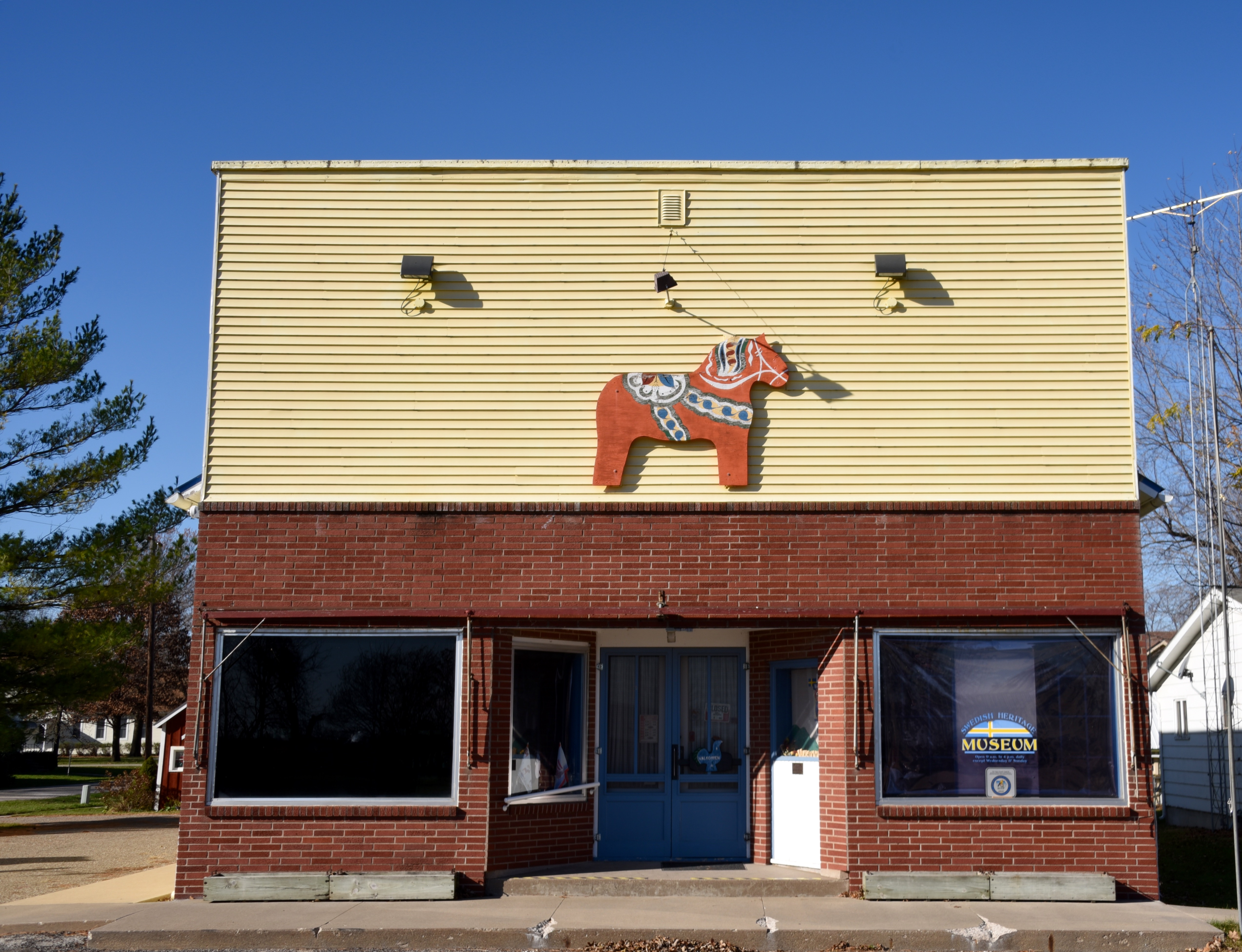
- Farmers Union Exchange (1928)

- Location within Iowa Location within the United States
- Location: Swedesburg, Iowa
- Coordinates: 41°06′16″N 91°32′41″W
- Area: less than one acre
- MPS: Henry County, Iowa MPS
- NRHP reference No.: 99000829
- Added to NRHP: July 15, 1999

The Swedesburg Historic Commercial District, also known as the Swedish Heritage Museum, is a nationally recognized historic district in Swedesburg, Iowa, United States. It was listed on the National Register of Historic Places in 1999. At the time of its nomination it consisted of four resources, which included three contributing buildings and one non-contributing building.

The three historic buildings housed commercial businesses beginning in an era when this unincorporated community was a settlement of Swedish immigrants. It is not known when the first retail establishment was built here, by the Berg Hardware Store, the frame building furthest to the west, was constructed in 1875. The Sam White General Store, the middle frame building, was completed in 1881. Both of these buildings were moved to their present location when the Farmers Union Exchange was built in 1928. This building type, a frame structure with the "boomtown" front, was typical of frontier towns and were replaced by brick buildings as the town grew. However, in many small towns in Iowa, this style continued to be the norm. The brick veneer and the aluminum siding above it were added to the front of the building in 1964.

The Farmers Union Exchange had been formed after the Anderson and Nelson Store moved their business and their building north to Olds, Iowa. The White store building was joined to the new building for extra space, and the Berg building was used for storage. The store remained in operation until 1976. The complex was acquired by the Swedish Heritage Society for a museum in 1990, and opened the following year. The fourth, and non-contributing building, was built as a garage in 1928. It was converted into a stuga, a small Swedish cottage, by the museum so visitors could see what immigrants to this community left behind in the old country.
