= National State Bank (Mount Pleasant, Iowa) =

- U.S. National Register of Historic Places
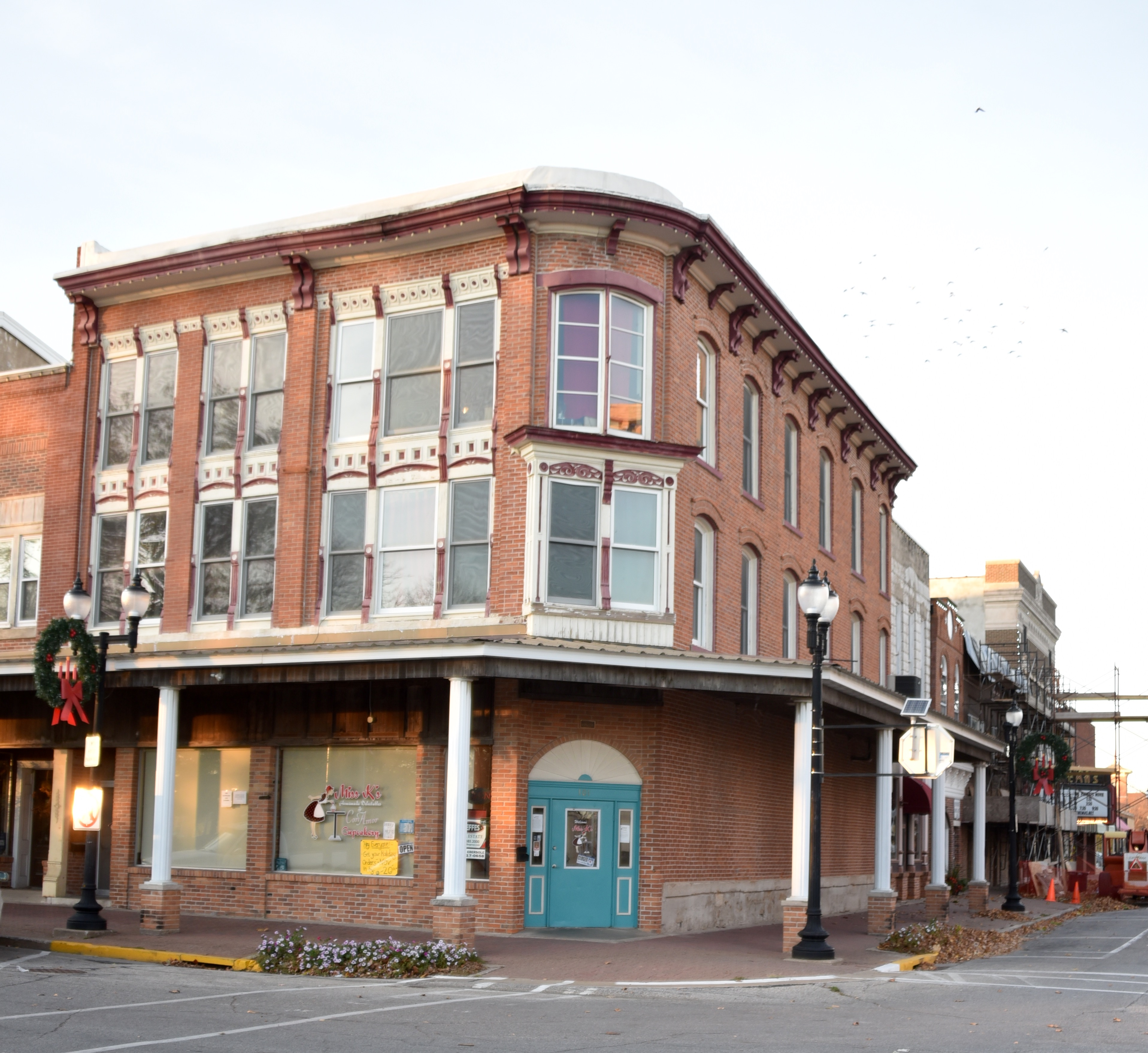

- Location within Iowa Location within the United States
- Location: 100 S. Main St., Mount Pleasant, Iowa
- Coordinates: 40°58′0.3″N 91°33′11.9″W
- Area: less than one acre
- Built: 1883
- Architectural style: Italianate
- MPS: Mount Pleasant MPS
- NRHP reference No.: 91001115
- Added to NRHP: September 6, 1991

National State Bank is a historic building located in Mount Pleasant, Iowa, United States. Because this two-story, brick Italianate structure was built specifically as a bank, it features a chamfered corner, which was commonly used to designate a bank in the last quarter of the 19th century. However, it combines other features typical of an Italianate commercial building in an unusual way. The secondary facade has segmental arched windows that are regularly spaced, while the primary facade has the windows in a sophisticated arrangement that one would expect of an architect-designed building. (The potential architect of this building, or even its builder, is unknown.) The metal cornice has widely spaced brackets on the primary facade and more typically spaced on the secondary facade. It also lacks an identification pediment on the corner, which is typical of the style. The building was listed on the National Register of Historic Places in 1991.
