= Second Baptist Church (Mount Pleasant, Iowa) =

- U.S. National Register of Historic Places
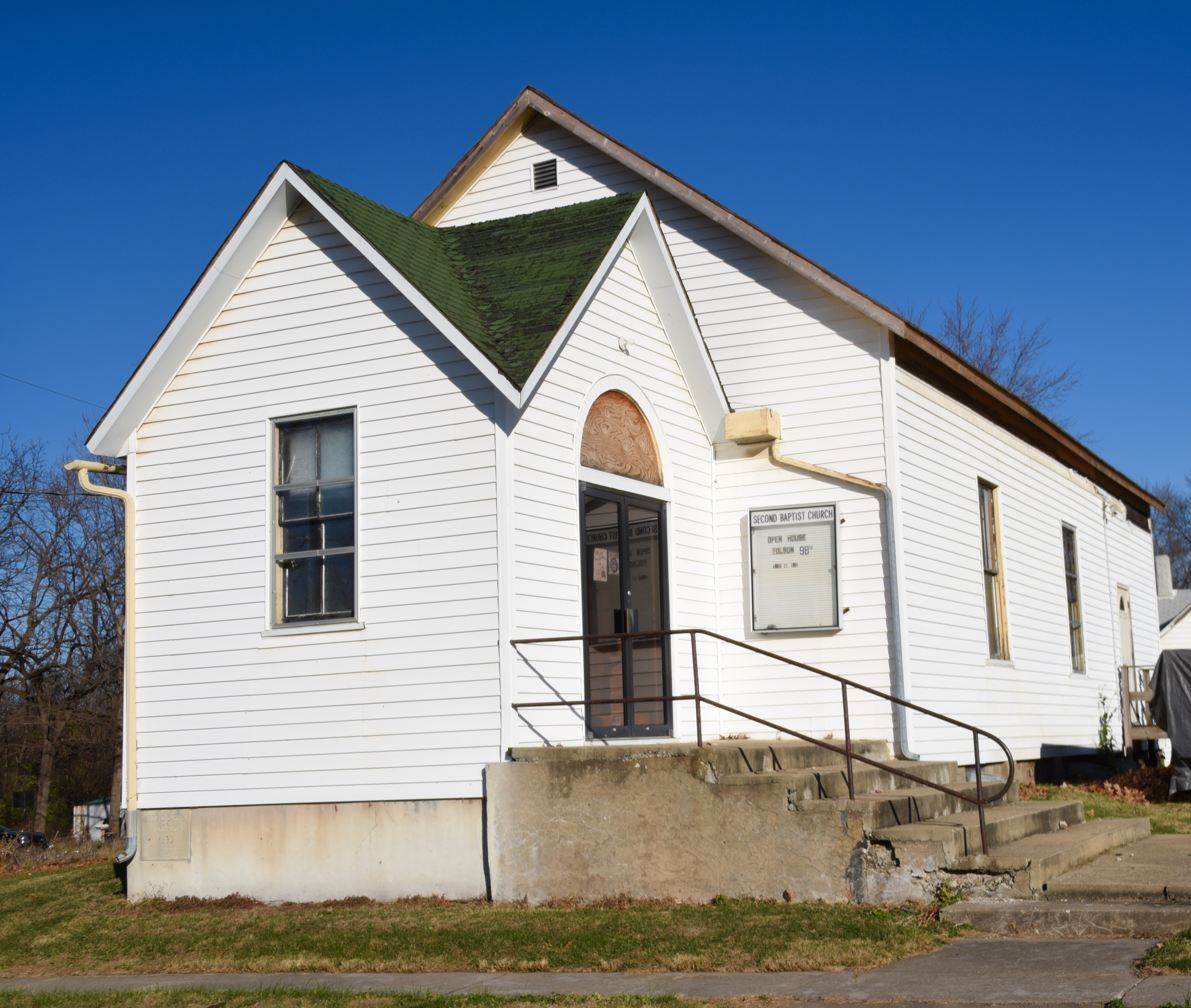

- Location within Iowa Location within the United States
- Location: 407 Saunders St. Mount Pleasant, Iowa
- Coordinates: 40°58′13.5″N 91°33′28.5″W
- Area: less than one acre
- NRHP reference No.: 14000906
- Added to NRHP: November 12, 2014

The former Second Baptist Church is a historic building located in Mount Pleasant, Iowa, United States. The First Colored Baptist Church of Mt. Pleasant, later Second Baptist Church, was founded in the summer of 1863 by members of First Baptist Church for the education and worship of the community's African American population. The congregation is also referred to as the "African Baptist Church". It is possible that this building was the original Methodist Episcopal church building constructed in 1843. It is believed that it was moved here in 1856 or 1857 for a newly established congregation of the Methodist Protestant Church. Either that or the main part of this small frame church was built here at that time. Regardless, the Methodist Protestant congregation did not succeed and the property was sold to First Baptist Church in January 1864 for use by the "Colored Baptist Church."

Because the local school district integrated their schools in 1867, this building was no longer used for a school. They had a basement built under the church for social events in 1914. It is less certain when the entry vestibule was built onto the front of the building. It could have been added in 1914 when the basement was built, but it seems to have been in place by 1930. Second Baptist Church continued to worship here until 2009 when they moved to a different building. They donated this building to the Mount Pleasant Historic Preservation Commission in 2013. It was listed on the National Register of Historic Places in 2014.
