= Brazelton House Hotel =

- U.S. National Register of Historic Places
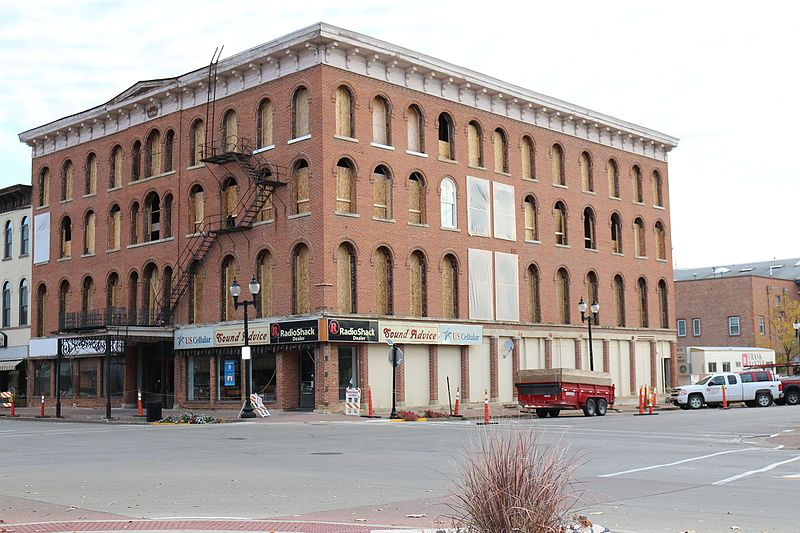

- Location within Iowa Location within the United States
- Location: 100 N. Main St. Mount Pleasant, Iowa
- Coordinates: 40°58′0.2″N 91°33′10.1″W
- Area: less than one acre
- Built: 1856
- Architectural style: Italianate
- NRHP reference No.: 86002700
- Added to NRHP: September 22, 1986

The Brazelton House Hotel is a historic building located in Mount Pleasant, Iowa, United States. William P. Brazelton was an early leader in the city's development. He owned the Brazelton Banking House and he was one of the directors of the Brazelton House Company, which built the hotel. It is not clear, specifically, why the hotel bears his family name. The construction of the hotel in 1856 coincided with a building boom in Mount Pleasant with the extension of the Burlington and Missouri River Railroad into town. It was built with the belief that Mount Pleasant would need a large first class hotel, but it had financial problems from the beginning and went through a series of owners until it no longer functioned as a hotel about 1970. The building was listed on the National Register of Historic Places in 1986. In 2015 the upper floors were converted into apartments while the main floor continued to house retail businesses.

At four floors it is the tallest building in the central business district. It was originally an L-shaped building, but a 1911 renovation covered the courtyard and created a two-story lobby. The building exhibits elements of the Italianate style, notably found in the bracketed eaves.
