= Salem, Iowa =

- City
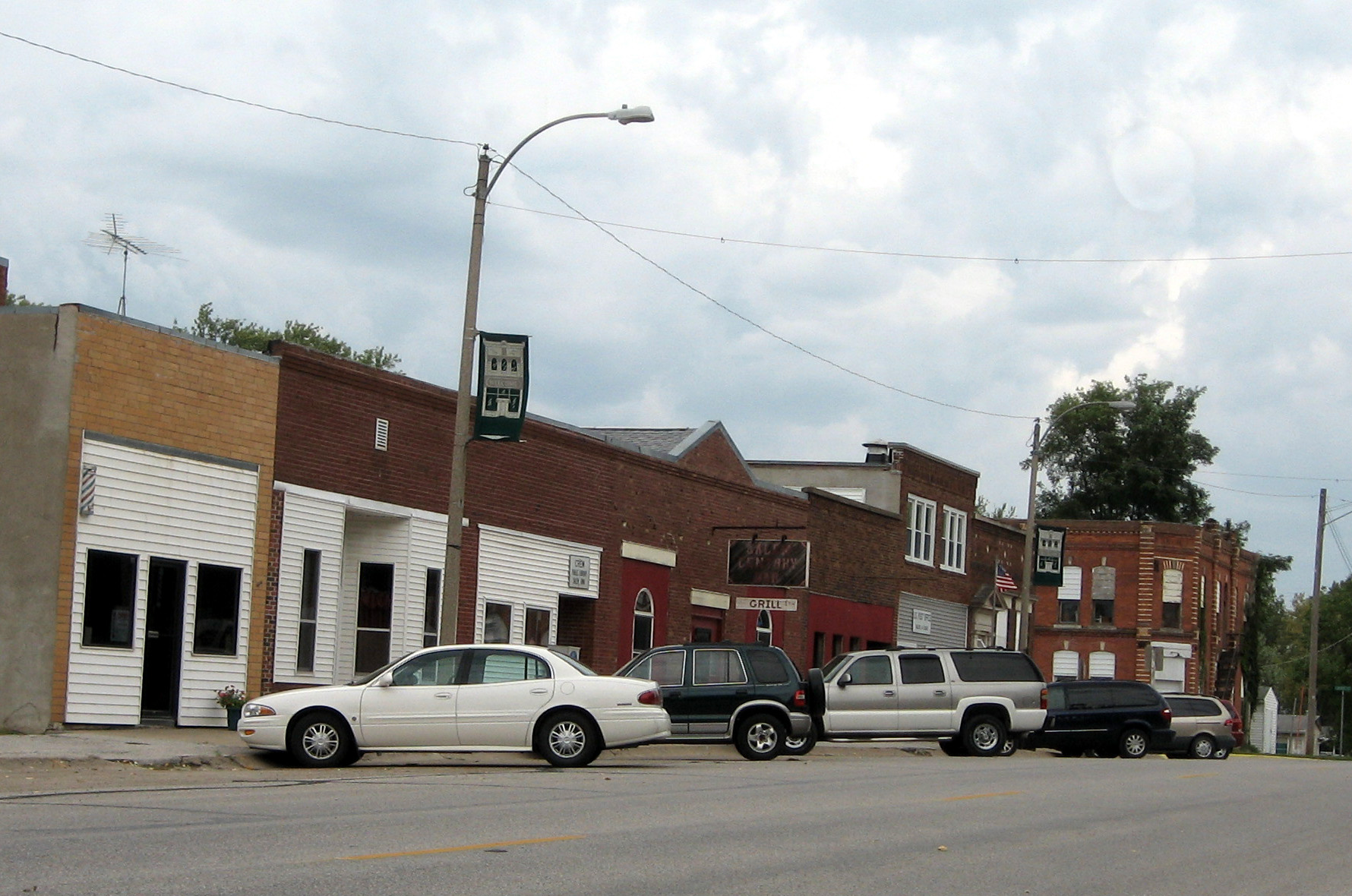
- Downtown Salem, Iowa

- Location of Salem, Iowa
- Coordinates: 40°51′07″N 91°37′14″W
- Country: United States
- State: Iowa
- County: Henry

Area
  - Total: 0.63 sq mi (1.63 km^{2})
  - Land: 0.63 sq mi (1.62 km^{2})
  - Water: 0.0039 sq mi (0.01 km^{2})
- Elevation: 709 ft (216 m)

Population (2020)
  - Total: 394
  - Density: 629.6/sq mi (243.09/km^{2})
- Time zone: UTC-6 (Central (CST))
  - Summer (DST): UTC-5 (CDT)
- ZIP code: 52649
- Area code: 319
- FIPS code: 19-70230
- GNIS feature ID: 2396527
- Website: salemcityhall.wixsite.com/salemiowa

Salem is a city in Henry County, Iowa, United States. The population was 394 at the time of the 2020 census.

== History ==
Salem was settled originally by Quakers with the intent that it be a community of Friends. In 1835 Aaron Street, while wending his way westward, came upon an uninhabited spot and declared "Now have mine eyes beheld a country teeming with every good thing…Hither will I come with my flocks and my herds, with my children and my children's children, and our city shall be called Salem, for thus was the city of our fathers, even near unto the seacoast." Independently another Quaker, Isaac Pigeon, who may have visited the spot before Street, brought his family to the area. They became the first citizens of Salem, and with Peter Boyer, began to recruit other Quakers to migrate westward to join them. As early as 1837, Friends meetings were held in private homes, and after the village was laid out in 1839 by Aaron Street Jr., and Peter Boyer, a meeting house was built. From the early years members of other Christian denominations settled in Salem, so it was never an exclusively Quaker community.

Being only twenty miles from the Missouri border, Salem became an important depot on the Underground Railroad. A prominent member of the abolitionists was Henderson Lewelling. His house on West Main St. is listed on the National Register of Historic Places as an Underground Railroad station. The Friends, however, had a dispute over the issue of abolition. Agreed in their opposition to slavery, they disagreed on actively helping slaves escape. In 1846, 50 members of the community, including Lewelling, were disfellowshiped. In 1847, the Lewelling family traveled by covered wagon along the Oregon Trail along with a special covered wagon that had been designed to transport more than 700 young fruit and nut trees, apples, pears, peaches, cherries, quince, walnut, and hickory. The surviving trees became the parent stock of all of the early orchards in the Pacific Northwest.

The Society of Friends also established a college in Salem. Whittier College, unrelated to the college of the same name in California, existed from 1868 to 1910.

== Geography ==
According to the United States Census Bureau, the city has a total area of 0.61 square miles (1.58 km^{2}), all land.

== Demographics ==
Historical populations
Year	Pop.	±%
1880	524	—
1890	551	+5.2%
1900	548	−0.5%
1910	501	−8.6%
1920	494	−1.4%
1930	460	−6.9%
1940	457	−0.7%
1950	473	+3.5%
1960	442	−6.6%
1970	458	+3.6%
1980	463	+1.1%
1990	453	−2.2%
2000	464	+2.4%
2010	383	−17.5%
2020	394	+2.9%
Source:"U.S. Census website". United States Census Bureau. and Iowa Data Center; Source: U.S. Decennial Census

=== 2020 census ===
As of the census of 2020, there were 394 people, 176 households, and 113 families residing in the city. The population density was 629.6 inhabitants per square mile (243.1/km^{2}). There were 187 housing units at an average density of 298.8 per square mile (115.4/km^{2}). The racial makeup of the city was 92.9% White, 0.3% Black or African American, 0.3% Native American, 0.8% Asian, 0.0% Pacific Islander, 2.3% from other races and 3.6% from two or more races. Hispanic or Latino persons of any race comprised 2.8% of the population.

Of the 176 households, 25.0% of which had children under the age of 18 living with them, 46.6% were married couples living together, 11.9% were cohabitating couples, 25.6% had a female householder with no spouse or partner present and 15.9% had a male householder with no spouse or partner present. 35.8% of all households were non-families. 26.7% of all households were made up of individuals, 13.1% had someone living alone who was 65 years old or older.

The median age in the city was 44.5 years. 20.3% of the residents were under the age of 20; 4.8% were between the ages of 20 and 24; 25.1% were from 25 and 44; 27.2% were from 45 and 64; and 22.6% were 65 years of age or older. The gender makeup of the city was 48.7% male and 51.3% female.

=== 2010 census ===
As of the census of 2010, there were 383 people, 176 households, and 105 families living in the city. The population density was 627.9 inhabitants per square mile (242.4/km^{2}). There were 196 housing units at an average density of 321.3 per square mile (124.1/km^{2}). The racial makeup of the city was 97.1% White, 0.5% African American, 0.3% Native American, 0.8% Asian, and 1.3% from two or more races. Hispanic or Latino of any race were 2.6% of the population.

There were 176 households, of which 23.9% had children under the age of 18 living with them, 40.9% were married couples living together, 13.6% had a female householder with no husband present, 5.1% had a male householder with no wife present, and 40.3% were non-families. 34.1% of all households were made up of individuals, and 14.2% had someone living alone who was 65 years of age or older. The average household size was 2.18 and the average family size was 2.80.

The median age in the city was 44.6 years. 21.4% of residents were under the age of 18; 7.3% were between the ages of 18 and 24; 22.5% were from 25 to 44; 29.7% were from 45 to 64; and 19.1% were 65 years of age or older. The gender makeup of the city was 44.1% male and 55.9% female.

=== 2000 census ===
As of the census of 2000, there were 464 people, 202 households, and 124 families living in the city. The population density was 763.7 inhabitants per square mile (294.9/km^{2}). There were 213 housing units at an average density of 350.6 per square mile (135.4/km^{2}). The racial makeup of the city was 97.41% White, 0.22% Native American, 0.43% Asian, 0.22% from other races, and 1.72% from two or more races. Hispanic or Latino of any race were 0.65% of the population.

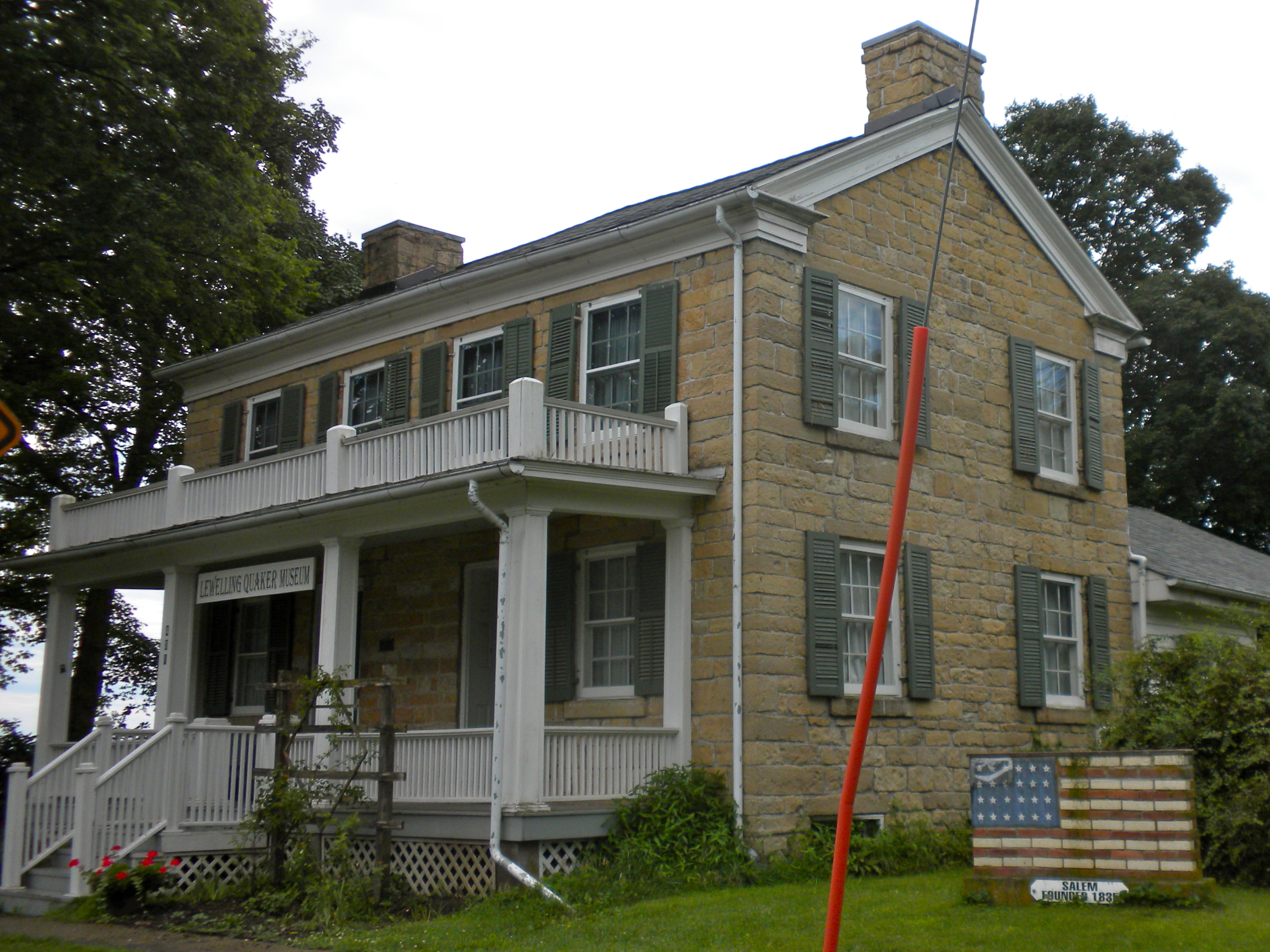
The Henderson Lewelling House on West Main St., was a station on the Underground Railroad and is listed on the National Register of Historic Places.

There were 202 households, out of which 29.7% had children under the age of 18 living with them, 48.5% were married couples living together, 7.4% had a female householder with no husband present, and 38.6% were non-families. 33.7% of all households were made up of individuals, and 20.3% had someone living alone who was 65 years of age or older. The average household size was 2.30 and the average family size was 2.98.

In the city, the population was spread out, with 23.7% under the age of 18, 5.8% from 18 to 24, 27.6% from 25 to 44, 23.3% from 45 to 64, and 19.6% who were 65 years of age or older. The median age was 40 years. For every 100 females, there were 91.7 males. For every 100 females age 18 and over, there were 97.8 males.

The median income for a household in the city was $31,500, and the median income for a family was $42,500. Males had a median income of $30,238 versus $22,143 for females. The per capita income for the city was $18,585. About 3.7% of families and 3.2% of the population were below the poverty line, including 4.6% of those under age 18 and 3.1% of those age 65 or over.

== Education ==
The Mount Pleasant Community School District operates local area public schools.

Salem Elementary School is within Salem. The district's secondary schools are Mount Pleasant Community Middle School and Mount Pleasant Community High School.

== Notable people ==
- Grenville Beardsley, Illinois Attorney General, was born in Salem.
- Frank E. Garretson, Brigadier general, U.S. Marine Corps; born in Salem.
- Lorenzo D. Lewelling, Governor of Kansas; born in Salem.
- Thomas Poulter, Antarctic explorer and geophysical scientist.
- William Savage, ornithologist and painter

== See also ==
- Holtkamp Round Barn, listed on the National Register of Historic Places
