= Burlington High School (Iowa) =

Public secondary school in Burlington, Iowa, United States

Burlington Community High School
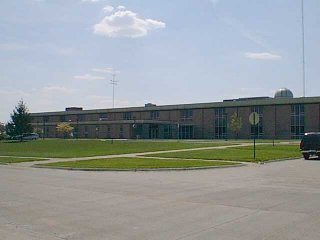

Location
- 421 Terrace Drive; Burlington, Iowa 52601; United States; 40.805°N 91.136°W

Information
- Type: Public Secondary
- Established: 1968
- School district: Burlington Community School District
- Principal: Brandon Kurovski
- Faculty: 63.55 (FTE)
- Grades: 9-12
- Enrollment: 1,090 (2023-2024)
- Student to teacher ratio: 17.15
- Colors: Purple and Grey
- Athletics: Southeast Conference (Iowa)
- Mascot: Homer the Hound (Grayhound)
- Newspaper: Purple and Gray
- Yearbook: Pathfinder
- Website: bhs.bcsds.org
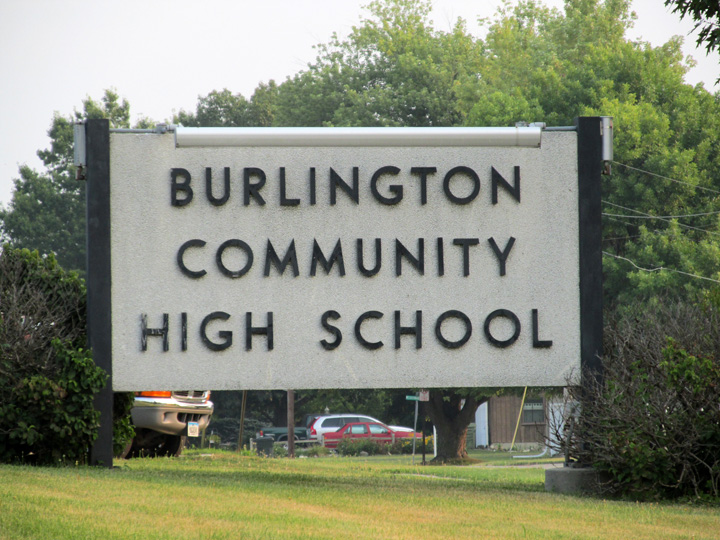

Burlington Community High School, or Burlington High School, is a four-year public high school located in Burlington, Iowa. The school has an enrollment of 1,092 students in grades 9 through 12. It is located at 421 Terrace Street and takes up the entire block on the west side of the street, from Terrace Drive, to Roosevelt Avenue, and north-south, from Division Street, to Johanssen Drive. The current building was completed in 1969, with the first graduating class in 1970. Prior to that, the school was located in another two-building campus two blocks west of Central Avenue, near the downtown business district. Until 1983, 9th grade students were enrolled in a separate building. The following school year, ninth grade was integrated into the high school.

As the only high school in the district, it serves Burlington and Middletown, as well as some residences in the western portion of West Burlington.

The school sports teams are called the Grayhounds, and is only one of two high schools in the nation to use a purple and gray color scheme.

== Campus ==
The campus consists of two buildings: the two-story main building and the single-story industrial arts building. It has one outdoor classroom, a running track, a football practice field, a softball field, one baseball field, and an indoor swimming pool. The two-story main building, which houses all of the classes but the standard shop classes, is built in a U-shape, with the cafeteria located in the center of the building. The gym, music rooms, band rooms, and all sports facilities are located in the left wing and the main classrooms are in the right wing. The current building is the third building the school has occupied since it opened; the first building stands as the current district maintenance shops and the second building sits on a hill only two blocks from the original building. It has been unoccupied since 1996.

== Sporting facilities ==
The locations for the sports teams are scattered throughout the city, the baseball team plays primarily at nearby Community Field, the home of Burlington's Prospect League team, the Burlington Bees, but will play at the on campus field when necessary. The football, and soccer teams utilize Bracewell Stadium, located inside of a ravine in the center of the city, surrounded by bluffs on all four sides and was the first football stadium west of the Mississippi River to install lights for night games. The basketball team primarily uses the gym at the school campus, but can also utilize Clark Field House, located directly to the north of Bracewell Stadium. The swimming team uses the pool on the grounds, they also have access to the indoor pool located at the local YMCA/YWCA, and the softball team uses the softball field located there as well as the track and tennis teams using facilities on the campus.

== Athletics ==
The Grayhounds compete in the Southeast Conference in the following sports:

- Baseball
  - 3-time State Champions (1946, 1973, 1975)
- Basketball
  - Boys' 1987 Class 3A State Champions
- Cross Country
  - Boys' 2009 Class 4A State Champions
- Football
  - 2-time State Champions (1951, 1959)
- Golf
  - Boys' 2000 Class 4A State Champions
  - Girls' 1980 Class 3A State Champions
- Soccer
- Softball
- Tennis
- Track and Field
- Volleyball
- Wrestling

== Notable alumni ==
- Jim Dunegan, former MLB player, (Chicago Cubs) Class of 1965
- James M. Kelly, is a NASA Astronaut and a retired Colonel of the United States Air Force Class of 1982
- Tony Baker, (1945-1998), former NFL running back with the New Orleans Saints, Philadelphia Eagles, Los Angeles Rams and San Diego Chargers, 1969 Pro Bowl selection as a starter, Class of 1963
- Brian D. Metzger, astrophysicist and professor of Physics at Columbia University, known for his theoretical predictions of the light produced by merging neutron stars and the origin of gold, Class of 1999
- Mitch King, 2-time All-Big Ten defensive end at the University of Iowa, formerly played for the Houston Texans, Class of 2004
- Jimmie E. Howard, served with the United States Marine Corps. in Vietnam where he was awarded the Medal of Honor, the Guided Missile Destroyer USS Howard (DDG-83) was named in his honor, Class of 1949
- Matthew Rinker, member of the Iowa House of Representatives, Class of 2003

== See also ==
- List of high schools in Iowa
