= Danville Community School District =

Public school district in Danville, Iowa, United States

Coordinates: 40.860548°N 91.315513°W

Address
- 419 S Main St. Danville, IA 52623 Danville, Iowa, 52623; United States
- Coordinates: 40.860548, -91.315513

District information
- Type: Public
- Motto: "Small school. Big results."
- Grades: K-12
- Established: 1963
- Superintendent: Patrick Wallace
- Schools: 2
- Budget: $9,853,000 (2020-21)
- NCES District ID: 1908550

Students and staff
- Students: 662 (2022-23)
- Teachers: 51.78 FTE
- Staff: 47.72 FTE
- Student–teacher ratio: 12.78
- Athletic conference: Southeast Iowa Superconference; South Division
- District mascot: Bears/Lady Bears
- Colors: Royal blue and White

Other information
- Affiliation(s): (Boys' sports) IHSAA and (Girls' Sports) IGHSAU
- Website: www.danvillecsd.org

The Danville Community School District is a rural public school district headquartered in Danville, Iowa. It is mainly in Des Moines County, with a small area in Henry County, and serves the city of Danville and the surrounding rural areas.

== Schools ==
The district operates two schools in a single facility in Danville:

- Danville Elementary School
- Danville Junior-Senior High School

== Athletics ==
The Bears/Lady Bears compete in the Southeast Iowa Superconference (South Division), in the following sports:

- Boys' & Girls' Cross country
- Girls' Volleyball
- Boys' Wrestling (Co-op with Notre Dame, and West Burlington)
- Boys' & Girls' Basketball
- Boys' & Girls' Track and field
- Boys' & Girls' Golf
- Boys' Soccer (Co-op with New London)
- Girls' Soccer (Co-op with Notre Dame, and West Burlington)
- Boys' Baseball
- Girls' Softball

The Bears send their athletes to the following schools to compete in the Southeast Conference in the following sport(s):

Mount Pleasant:

- Boys' & Girls' Bowling

Burlington:

- Boys' & Girls' Tennis
- Boys' & Girls' Swimming

Fort Madison:

- Girls' Wrestling

For American Football, the Bears compete in Iowa Class A District 5 (As of 2025).

== See also ==
- List of school districts in Iowa
- List of high schools in Iowa
