= West Burlington Independent School District =

Public school district in West Burlington, Iowa, United States

Coordinates: 40.820055°N 91.159488°W

Address
- 408 W Van Weiss Blvd. West Burlington, Iowa, 52655; United States
- Coordinates: 40.820055, -91.159488

District information
- Type: Public
- Grades: K-12
- Established: 1961
- Superintendent: Dr. Jason Wester
- Schools: 3
- Budget: $11,922,000 (2020-21)
- NCES District ID: 1930780

Students and staff
- Students: 916 (2022-23)
- Teachers: 61.72 FTE
- Staff: 62.38 FTE
- Student–teacher ratio: 14.84
- Athletic conference: Southeast Iowa Superconference; South Division
- District mascot: Falcons
- Colors: Green and White

Other information
- Affiliation(s): (Boys' sports) IHSAA and (Girls' Sports) IGHSAU
- Website: wbisd.com

The West Burlington Independent School District is a public school district in West Burlington, Iowa, and is home to the West Burlington Falcons.

The district serves almost all residential areas in West Burlington.

== Early history ==
In the history of the district, there have been six buildings which could be called "West Burlington Schools". The first was called "Fairview", however it was located on the north side of Mt. Pleasant Street, which technically made it outside of city limits. The next school was located on the corner of Wheeler and Ramsey street, and was founded around 1888. Later, it was replaced by a brick two-story school which was used until 1939 when a Public Works Administration project happened, which reconstructed the building. It was the only elementary building for students until 1956 when the current elementary was built.

== West Burlington Elementary School ==
The current Elementary school houses Pre-school through grade five. In 1960–61, an eight-room wing was added on and grades four through six were relocated to the elementary building. In 1997 an addition was added to the building and many rooms were remodeled. The old gym was turned into the library and a new wing containing ten classrooms, a gym, and a music room was added. The building was further upgraded in 2005–2006. The new addition contained another set of ten classrooms, a remodeled nurse's office, front office, and special ed classrooms. Eventually, the grades were changed to Pre-school up to grade five, however, starting in the 2024–2025 school year, the elementary will change to Pre-school up to grade six.

== Central Office (Old Middle School) ==
The Central Office (formerly West Burlington Middle School) was built in the early 1930s. In 1997 it was converted from a school building to the central offices for the school district due to asbestos issues with the building and lack of handicap access to the second story.

== West Burlington Arnold Jr./Sr. High School ==
West Burlington Arnold Jr./Sr. High School (formerly West Burlington High School & West Burlington Arnold High School) was built in three phases, the first beginning in 1966, and was finished in 1969. In 1972 the school was renamed in honor of Walter E. Arnold, a teacher in the district since 1931, and the superintendent from 1957 until his death -inside school walls- in 1971. In 1997 a major renovation project was done at the school. The high school gym had the stage removed and a concession stand was put in facing the cafeteria. The Junior High wing was also added. This added nine classrooms, renovated the library, added a computer lab, added another gym, and added a 399-seat auditorium. The front office was also remodeled during this project. Another addition to the building began in the fall of 2010 that added eight more classrooms.

== Athletics ==
The Falcons compete in the Southeast Iowa Superconference (South Division), in the following sports:

- Boys' & Girls' Basketball
- Boys' Baseball
- Girls' Volleyball

The following sports are branded as the West Burlington-Notre Dame Falcons:

- Boys' & Girls' Cross Country
- Boys' & Girls' Wrestling (Co-op with Danville)
- Boys' & Girls' Track and Field
- Girls' Softball
- Boys' & Girls' Bowling

The following sports are branded as the Notre Dame-West Burlington Nikes:

- Boys' & Girls' Golf
- Boys' & Girls' Tennis
- Boys' & Girls' Soccer (Co-op with New London)

The Falcons send their athletes to Burlington to compete in the Southeast Conference in the following sports:

- Boys' & Girls' Swimming
- Boys' & Girls' Tennis
- Girls' Wrestling

For American Football (Co-op with Notre Dame), the Falcons compete in Iowa Class 2A District 6 (As of 2025), and are branded as the West Burlington-Notre Dame Falcons.

== See also ==
- List of school districts in Iowa
- List of high schools in Iowa
