= Notre Dame High School (Burlington, Iowa) =

Private secondary school in Burlington, Iowa, United States

Burlington Notre Dame High School
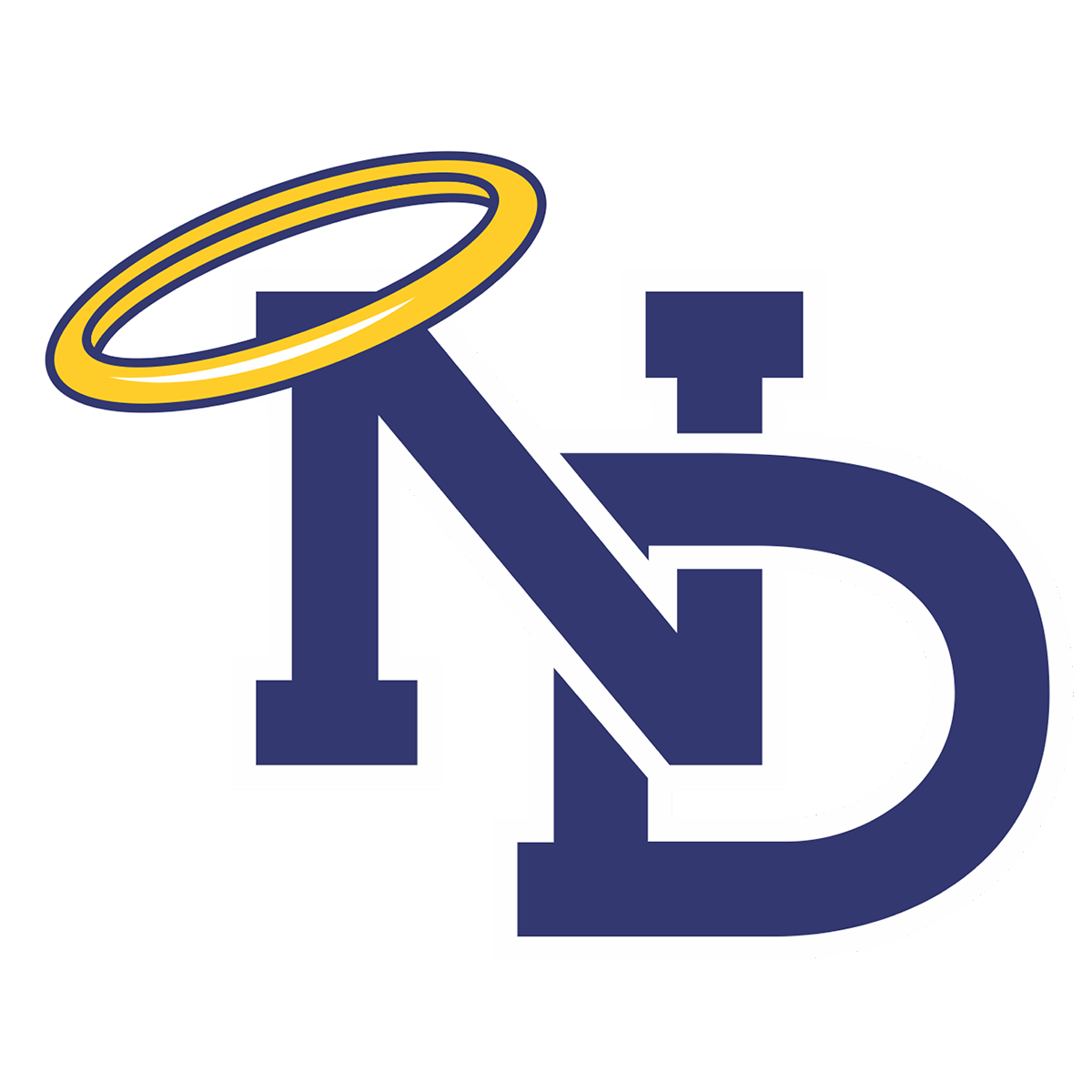

Location
- 702 South Roosevelt Ave. Burlington, Iowa 52601; United States; 40°48′9″N 91°8′30″W

Information
- Type: Private, Coeducational
- Motto: "Inspiring the mind, engaging the heart."
- Religious affiliation: Roman Catholic
- Established: 1957
- Superintendent: Lynne De
- Principal: Angie Prottsman
- Grades: 9–12
- Colors: Navy Blue and Gold
- Slogan: "Engage the heart Inspire the mind."
- Athletics conference: Southeast Iowa Superconference; South Division
- Mascot: Nike (Angel)
- Team name: Nikes
- Rivalries: Danville, Holy Trinity Catholic, and West Burlington
- Affiliation(s): (Boys' sports) IHSAA and (Girls' Sports) IGHSAU
- Website: www.burlingtonnotredame.com

Notre Dame High School is a private, Roman Catholic high school in Burlington, Iowa. It is located in the Roman Catholic Diocese of Davenport.

== Background ==
Notre Dame opened in 1957. The current high school principal is Angie Prottsman. The past three principals were Bill Maupin Dave Edwards and Ron Glasgow. The current choir director is Mr. Isaac McNutt. The last choir director was Amanda Brent. The current band director is Mrs. Carmen Lachnitt.

== Athletics ==
The Nikes compete in the Southeast Iowa Superconference (South Division), in the following sports:

- Boys' & Girls' Basketball
- Boys' Baseball
- Girls' Volleyball

The following sports are branded as the West Burlington-Notre Dame Falcons:

- Boys' & Girls' Cross Country
- Boys' & Girls' Wrestling (Co-op with Danville)
- Boys' & Girls' Track and Field
- Girls' Softball
- Boys' & Girls' Bowling

The following sports are branded as the Notre Dame-West Burlington Nikes:

- Boys' & Girls' Golf
- Boys' & Girls' Tennis
- Boys' & Girls' Soccer (Co-op with New London)

The Nikes send their athletes to Burlington to compete in the Southeast Conference in the following sports:

- Boys' & Girls' Swimming
- Girls' Tennis
- Girls' Wrestling

For American Football (Co-op with West Burlington), the Nikes compete in Iowa Class 2A District 6 (As of 2025), and are branded as the West Burlington-Notre Dame Falcons.

== Fine arts ==
- Boys' and Girls' Choir
- Boys' and Girls' Band
- Boys' and Girls' Jazz Band
- Boys' and Girls' Jazz Choir

== See also ==
- St. Paul's Catholic Church (Burlington, Iowa)
- Church of St. John the Baptist (Burlington, Iowa)
- List of high schools in Iowa
