= Rendezvous pitch maneuver =

Maneuver performed by the Space Shuttle

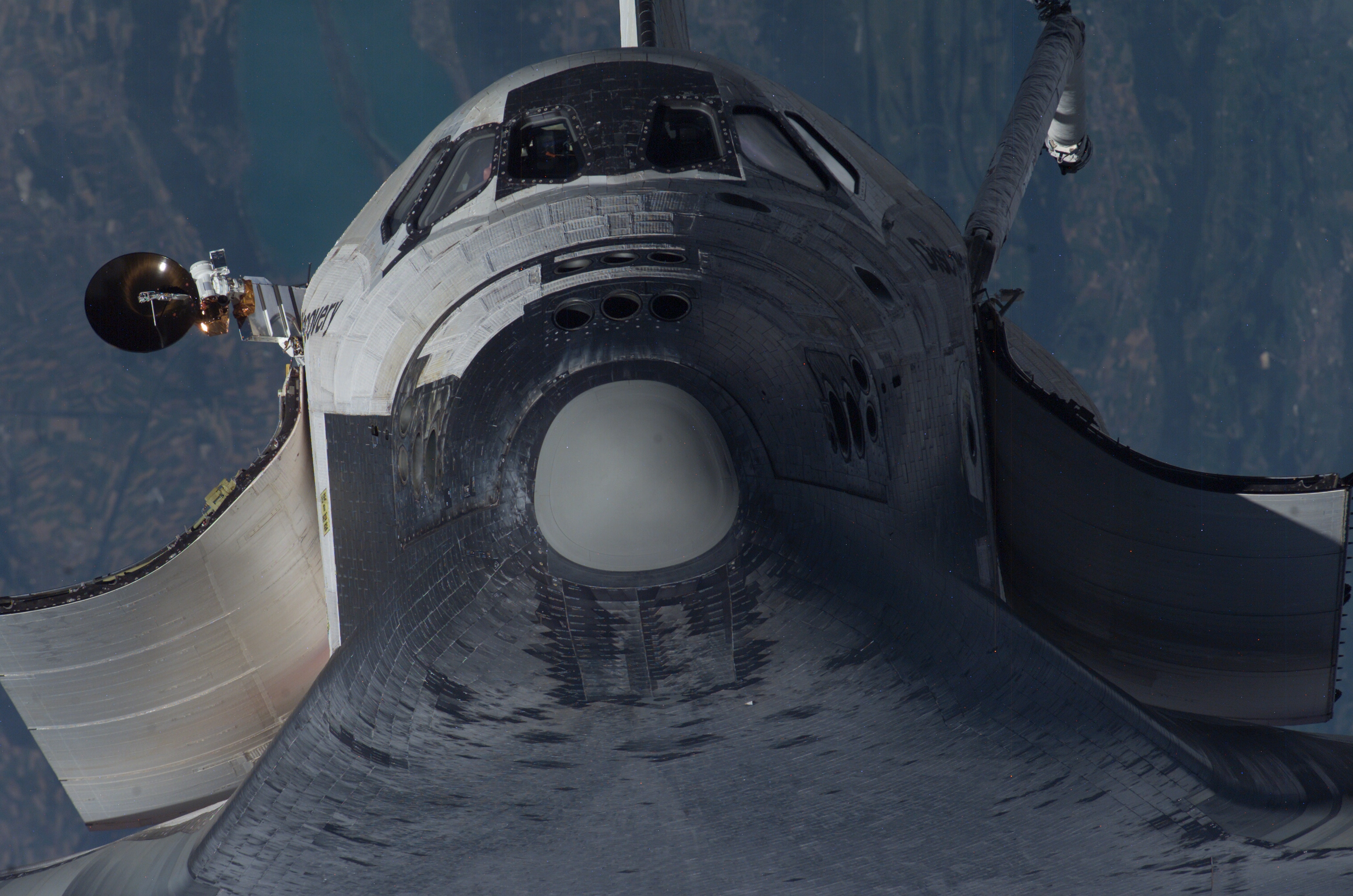
The Space Shuttle Discovery performing the rendezvous pitch maneuver during STS-114.

The R-bar pitch maneuver (RPM), popularly called the rendezvous pitch maneuver or backflip, was a maneuver performed by the Space Shuttle as it rendezvoused with the International Space Station (ISS) prior to docking. The Shuttle performed a backflip that exposed its heat-shield so the crew of the ISS could photograph it. Based on the information gathered during the rendezvous pitch maneuver, the mission team could decide whether the orbiter was safe for re-entry. They may have then decided either to wait on the ISS for a rescue mission or attempt extra-vehicular activity to repair the heat shield and secure the safe re-entry of the orbiter. This was a standard procedure recommended by CAIB for all space shuttles docking to the International Space Station after a damaged heat shield caused the Columbia disaster.

== Maneuver description ==
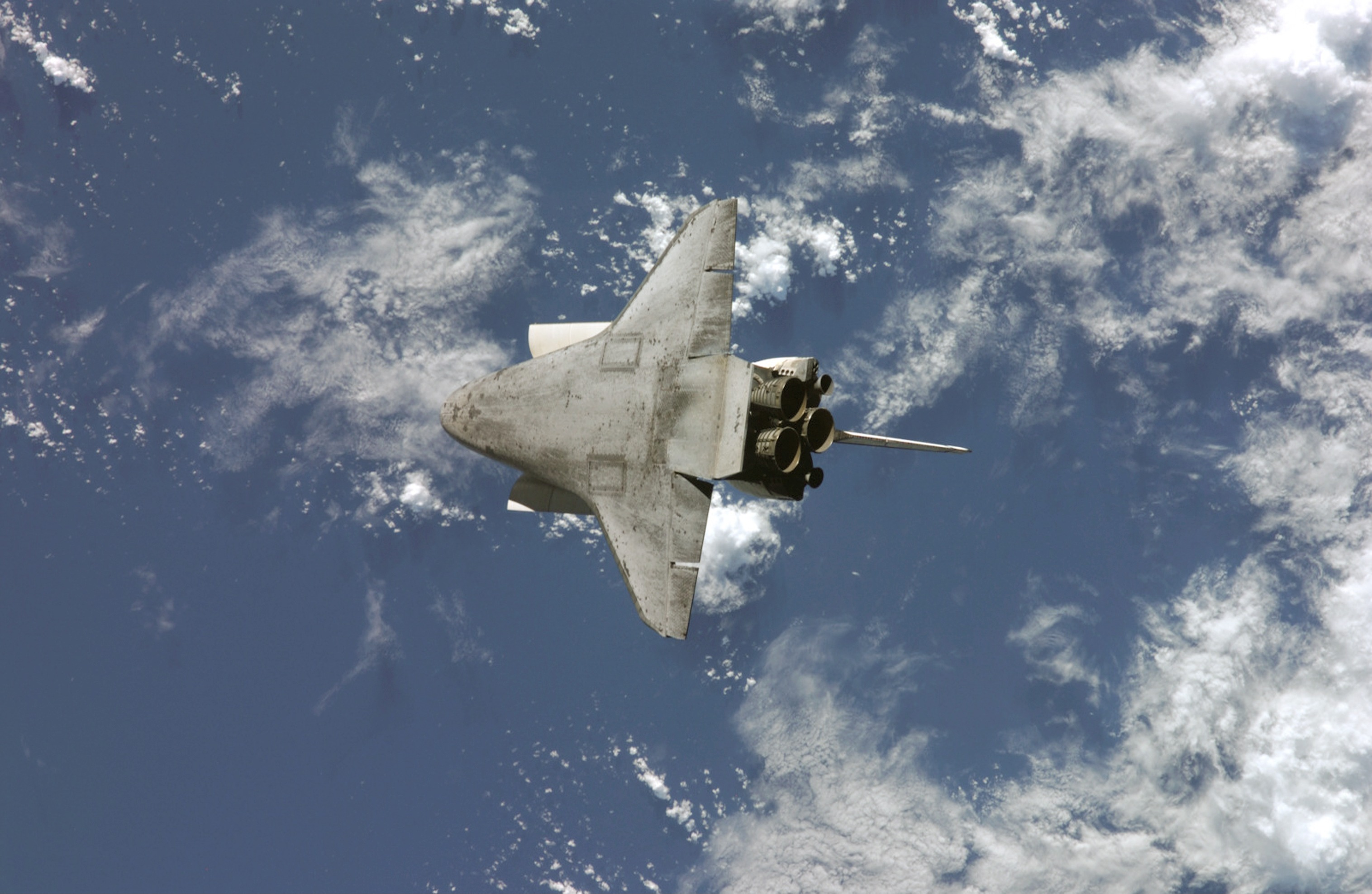
Underside view of Atlantis during STS-117, as it approached the International Space Station and performed a rendezvous pitch maneuver.

Video of the RPM of STS-122

The name of the maneuver was based on the R-bar and V-bar lines that are used in the approach of the space station. R-bar or Earth radius vector is an imaginary line connecting the space station to the center of the Earth. V-bar would be the velocity vector of the space station. The shuttle approached the station along the R-bar line and at a small distance from the ISS, usually around 600 feet (180 meters), the shuttle performed a slow 360° pitch, during which it exposed its underside, the heat shield, to the ISS. The crew inside the ISS visually inspected and photographed the heat shield to determine whether or not it had been damaged during liftoff and ascent. This maneuver required skilled piloting, as the Shuttle commander must fly very close to the ISS without the station always in full view. After the maneuver is complete the shuttle flew from the R-bar to the V-bar, a 90-degree angle change as seen from ISS and then continued along the V-bar line to close in on the space station and eventually complete the docking.

The rendezvous pitch maneuver was developed by NASA engineers Steve Walker, Mark Schrock and Jessica LoPresti after the Space Shuttle Columbia disaster. Columbia had sustained damage to its heat shield due to insulating foam breaking off the external tank and hitting the shield at liftoff. The damage was too great for the heat shield to protect the shuttle from the heat and structural strain of atmospheric reentry, causing it to break apart. For this reason, the integrity of the heat shield had been a critical concern of NASA ever since. The maneuver was first performed by Mission Commander Eileen Collins on STS-114, which was one of Space Shuttle Discovery's two "Return To Flight" missions after the Columbia STS-107 disaster.

== Photographers and photographic equipment used during RPMs ==
=== STS-114 ===
During STS-114, the rendezvous pitch maneuver was performed by Commander Eileen Collins shortly before docking with the ISS at 11:18 UTC on July 28, 2005, when Space Shuttle Discovery was photographed by Commander Sergei Krikalev and Flight Engineer John L. Phillips, of the ISS Expedition 11, using handheld Kodak 760 DCS digital cameras. On this occasion, astronaut Stephen Robinson undertook a precautionary spacewalk to remove protruding gap fillers prior to re-entry.

=== STS-115 ===
During STS-115, Atlantis' belly was photographed by the ISS Expedition 13.

=== STS-116 ===
During STS-116, Discovery, commanded by Mark L. Polansky, performed the RPM and was photographed by the ISS Expedition 14.

=== STS-117 ===
During the RPM of STS-117 performed by mission commander Rick Sturckow, Sunita Williams and another member of Expedition 15 used 400mm and 800mm lenses for taking photos out of two windows of the ISS.

=== STS-118 ===
During STS-118 the RPM of Endeavour was photographed by Expedition 15. The maneuver was videotaped by Clay Anderson and photographed by Fyodor Yurchikhin and Oleg Kotov with 800mm and 400mm lenses. A Focused Inspection of a damaged portion of Endeavour's heat shield was performed by the STS-118 crew later in the mission after ground engineers reviewed the RPM photographs.

=== STS-120 ===
Expedition 16 crewmembers Clay Anderson and Yuri Malenchenko photographed and videotaped the RPM of Discovery during STS-120.

=== STS-121 ===
During STS-121, the rendezvous pitch maneuver was performed at 14:02 UTC on July 6, 2006, when Discovery was photographed by Commander Pavel Vinogradov and Flight Engineer Jeffrey Williams of the ISS Expedition 13, using 400mm and 800mm lenses.

=== STS-122 ===
The STS-122 RPM occurred on February 9, 2008. From 16:24 to 16:31 UTC, Atlantis pilot Alan G. Poindexter performed the RPM. The RPM was photographed by Expedition 16 crew members Peggy Whitson and Yuri Malenchenko with 400mm and 800mm lenses, respectively, from the Zvezda service module. Malenchenko had been directed to take extra images of the starboard OMS pod, so an "area of interest" on the thermal blanket could be evaluated. Some 300 images were expected to be captured.

== See also ==
- Space rendezvous
