= STS-114 =

2005 American crewed spaceflight to the ISS

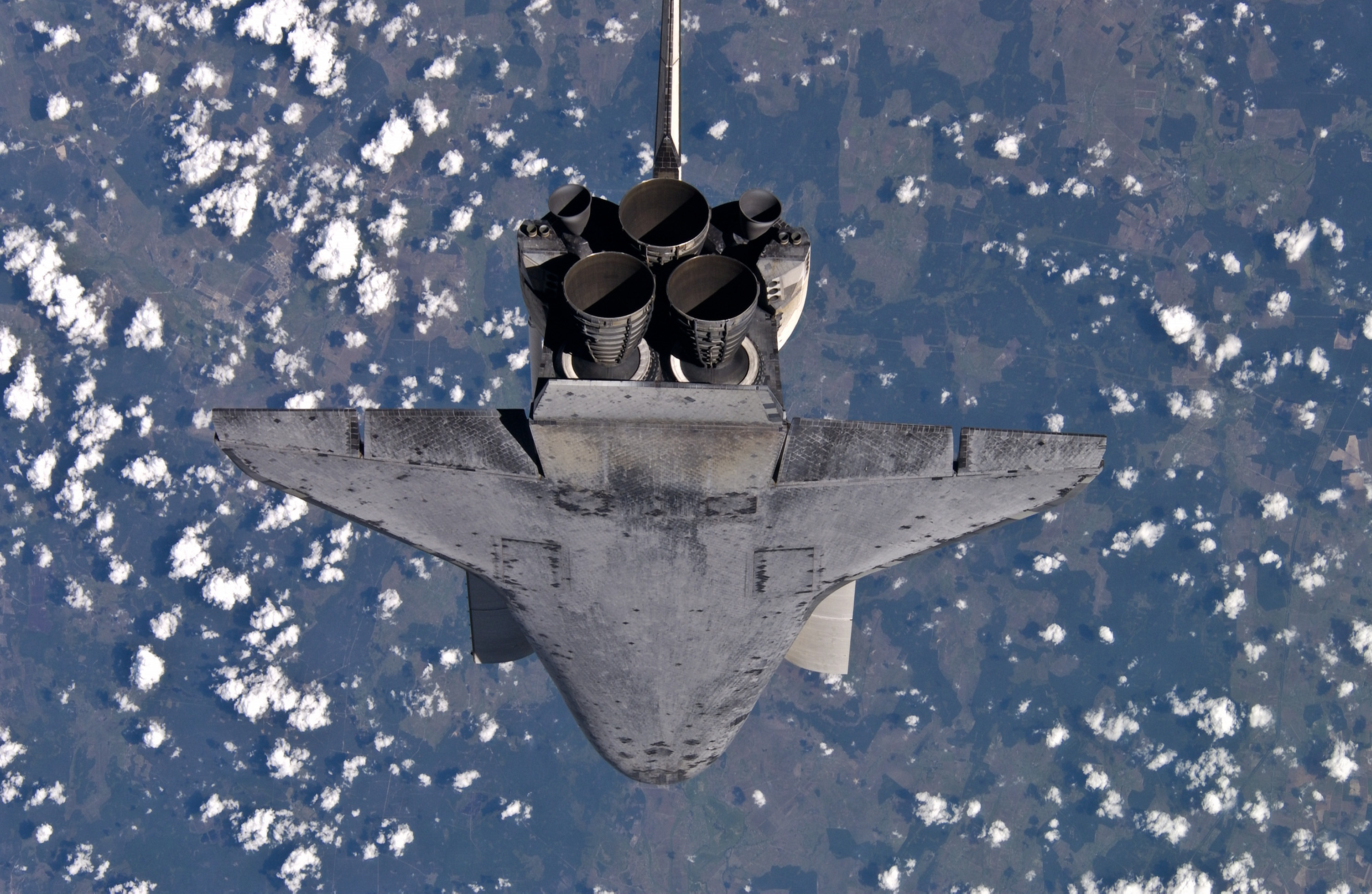
- Discovery performing the first ever rendezvous pitch maneuver during STS-114
- Names: Space Transportation System-114
- Mission type: Return to Flight, ISS logistics
- Operator: NASA
- COSPAR ID: 2005-026A
- SATCAT no.: 28775
- Mission duration: 13 days, 21 hours, 32 minutes, 48 seconds
- Distance travelled: 9,300,000 kilometres (5,800,000 mi)
- Orbits completed: 219

Spacecraft properties
- Spacecraft: Space Shuttle Discovery
- Launch mass: 121,483 kilograms (267,824 lb)
- Landing mass: 102,913 kilograms (226,884 lb)

Crew
- Crew size: 7
- Members: Eileen M. Collins; James M. Kelly; Soichi Noguchi; Stephen K. Robinson; Andrew S. W. Thomas; Wendy B. Lawrence; Charles J. Camarda

Start of mission
- Launch date: July 26, 2005, 14:39:00 UTC
- Launch site: Kennedy, LC-39B

End of mission
- Landing date: August 9, 2005, 12:11:22 UTC
- Landing site: Edwards, Runway 22

Orbital parameters
- Reference system: Geocentric
- Regime: Low Earth
- Perigee altitude: 350 kilometres (220 mi)
- Apogee altitude: 355 kilometres (221 mi)
- Inclination: 51.6 degrees
- Period: 91.59 minutes
- Epoch: July 31, 2005

Docking with ISS
- Docking port: PMA-2 (Destiny forward)
- Docking date: July 28, 2005
- Undocking date: August 6, 2005
- Time docked: 8 days, 19 hours, 54 minutes
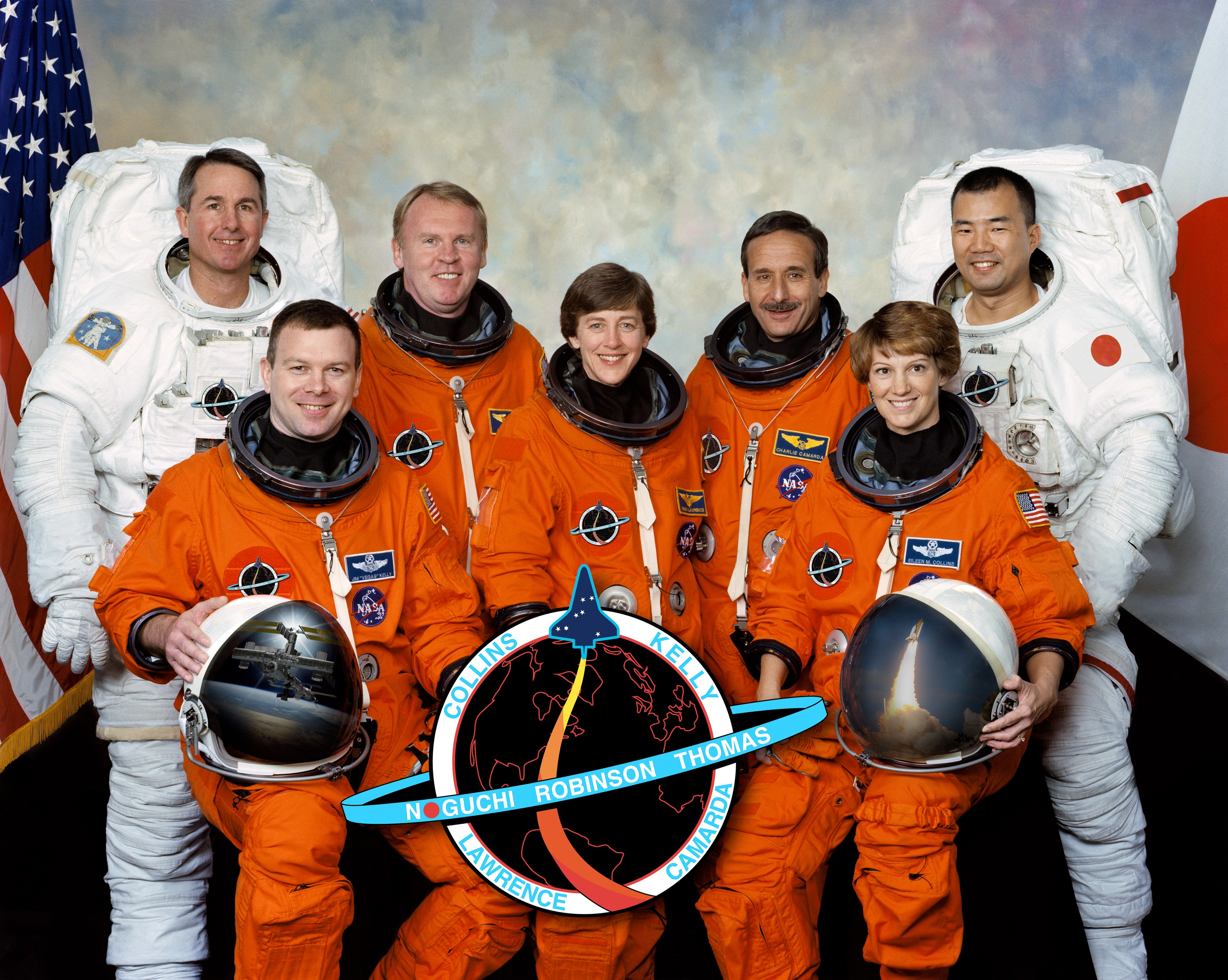
- Back (L-R): Robinson, Thomas, Camarda, Noguchi; Front (L–R): Kelly, Lawrence, Collins Space Shuttle program

STS-114 was the first "Return to Flight" Space Shuttle mission following the Space Shuttle Columbia disaster. Discovery launched at 10:39 EDT (14:39 UTC) on its 31st flight on July 26, 2005. The launch, 907 days (approx. 29 months) after the loss of Columbia, was approved despite unresolved fuel sensor anomalies in the external tank that had prevented the shuttle from launching on July 13, its originally scheduled date.

The mission ended on August 9, 2005, when Discovery landed at Edwards Air Force Base in California. Poor weather over the Kennedy Space Center in Florida hampered the shuttle from using its primary landing site.

Analysis of the launch footage showed debris separating from the external tank during ascent; this was of particular concern because it was the issue that had set off the Columbia disaster. As a result, NASA decided on July 27 to postpone future shuttle flights pending additional modifications to the flight hardware. Shuttle flights resumed a year later with STS-121 on July 4, 2006.

== Crew ==
Position	Astronaut
Commander	(United States) Eileen Collins; Fourth and last spaceflight
Pilot	(United States) James M. Kelly; Second and last spaceflight
Mission Specialist 1	(Japan) Soichi Noguchi, JAXA; First spaceflight
Mission Specialist 2 Flight Engineer	(United States) Stephen K. Robinson; Third spaceflight
Mission Specialist 3	(Australia) / (United States) Andrew S. W. Thomas; Fourth and last spaceflight
Mission Specialist 4	(United States) Wendy B. Lawrence; Fourth and last spaceflight
Mission Specialist 5	(United States) Charles J. Camarda; Only spaceflight

=== Original crew ===
This mission was to carry the Expedition 7 crew to the ISS and bring home the Expedition 6 crew. The original crew was to be:

Position	Launching Astronaut	Landing Astronaut
Commander	(United States) Eileen Collins	
Pilot	(United States) Jim Kelly	
Mission Specialist 1	(Japan) Soichi Noguchi, JAXA	
Mission Specialist 2 Flight Engineer	(United States) Stephen Robinson	
Mission Specialist 3	(Russia) Yuri Malenchenko, RKA; Expedition 7 ISS Commander	(United States) Ken Bowersox; Expedition 6 ISS Commander
Mission Specialist 4	(United States) Ed Lu; Expedition 7 ISS Flight Engineer	(Russia) Nikolai Budarin, RKA; Expedition 6 ISS Flight Engineer
Mission Specialist 5	(Russia) Aleksandr Kaleri, RKA; Expedition 7 ISS Flight Engineer	(United States) Donald Pettit; Expedition 6 ISS Flight Engineer

=== Crew seat assignments ===
Seat	Launch	Landing	Seats 1–4 are on the flight deck. Seats 5–7 are on the mid-deck.
1	Collins		Seats 1–4 are on the flight deck. Seats 5–7 are on the mid-deck.
2	Kelly		Seats 1–4 are on the flight deck. Seats 5–7 are on the mid-deck.
3	Noguchi	Thomas	Seats 1–4 are on the flight deck. Seats 5–7 are on the mid-deck.
4	Robinson		Seats 1–4 are on the flight deck. Seats 5–7 are on the mid-deck.
5	Thomas	Noguchi	Seats 1–4 are on the flight deck. Seats 5–7 are on the mid-deck.
6	Lawrence		Seats 1–4 are on the flight deck. Seats 5–7 are on the mid-deck.
7	Camarda		Seats 1–4 are on the flight deck. Seats 5–7 are on the mid-deck.

== Mission highlights ==
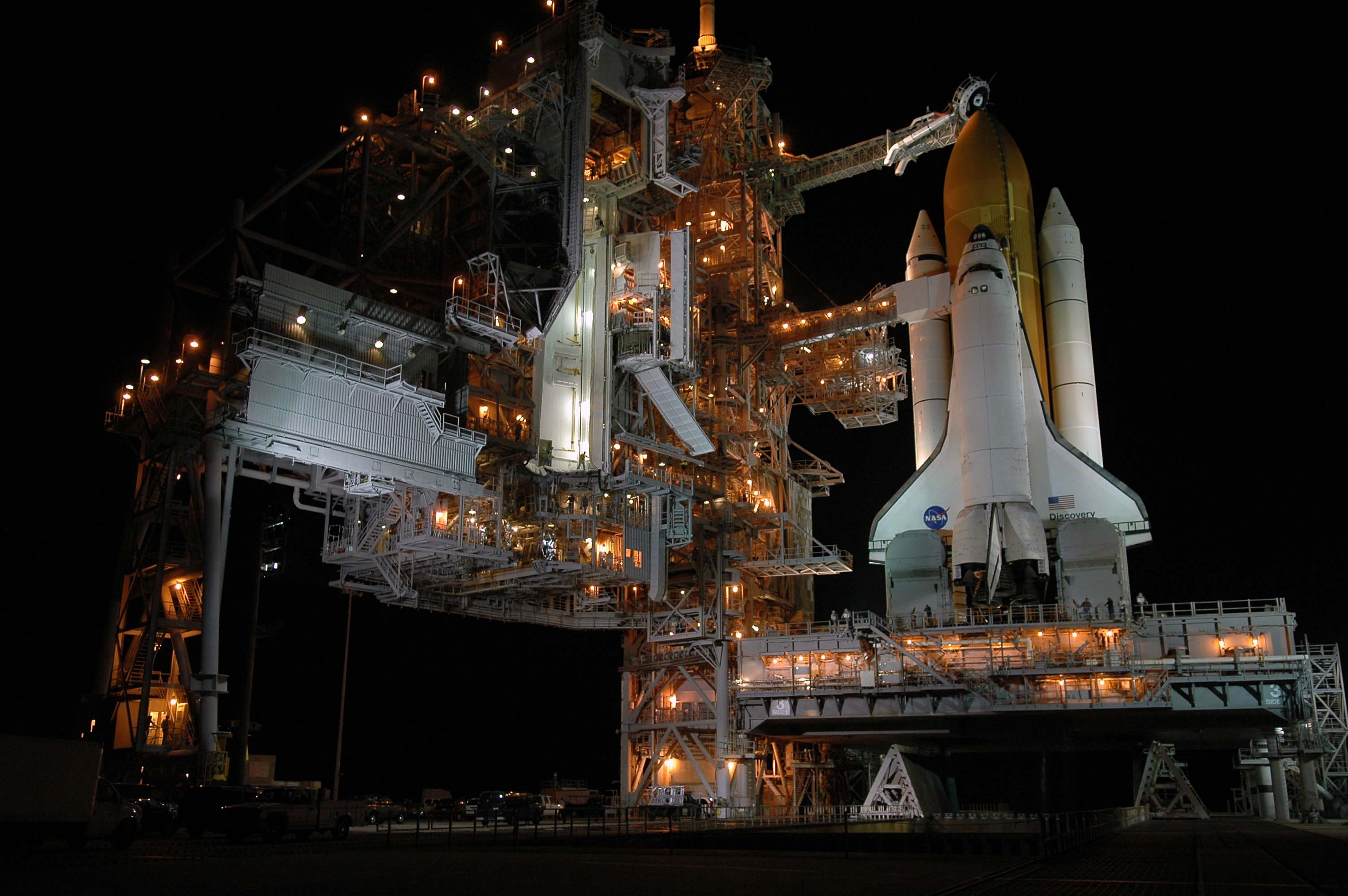
STS 114 day before launch

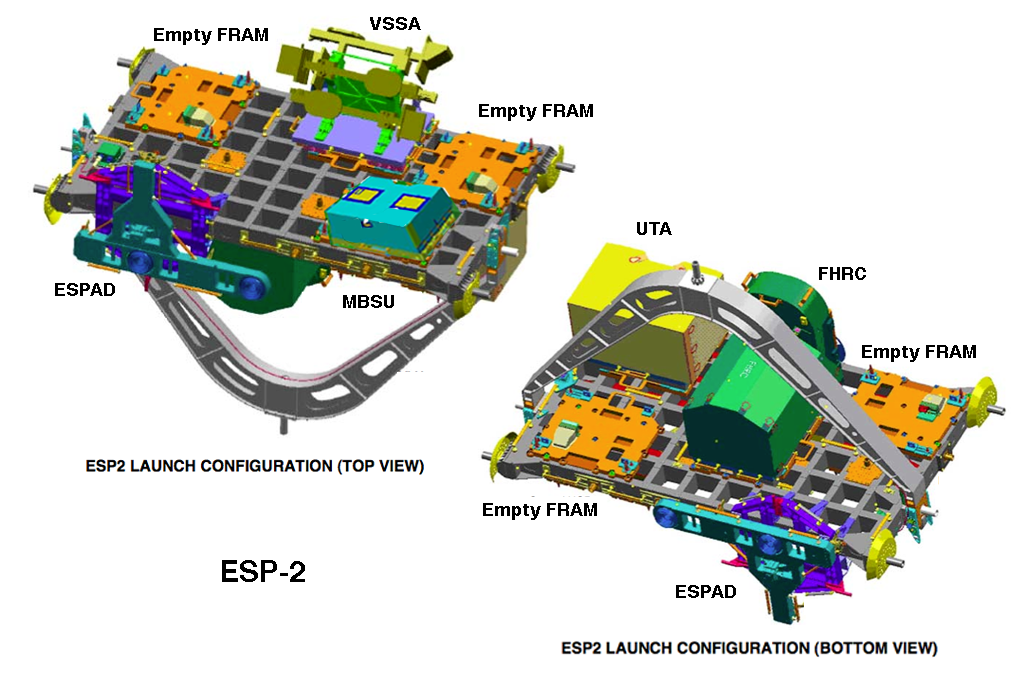
ESP-2 in launch configuration

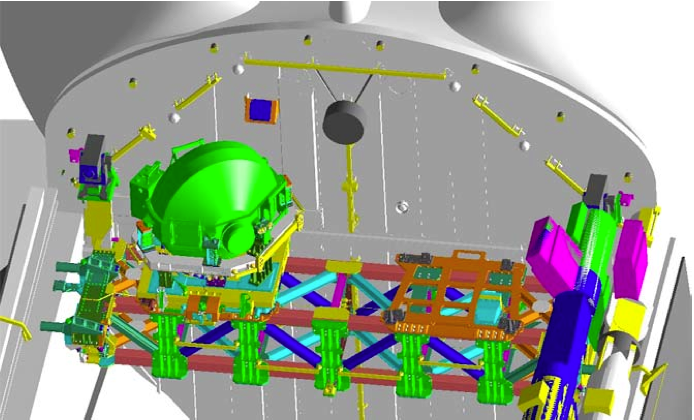
Shown here is the design of the LMC (Lightweight Multi-Purpose Experiment Support Structure Carrier), which was mounted in the rear of the Shuttle's cargo bay. Mounted on the LMC is the TPS Repair Box, which would have been used in case to repair the Thermal Protection System of the Space Shuttle. Furthermore, seen here on the left is one Control Moment Gyroscope (CMG), which was delivered as a replacement to the ISS.

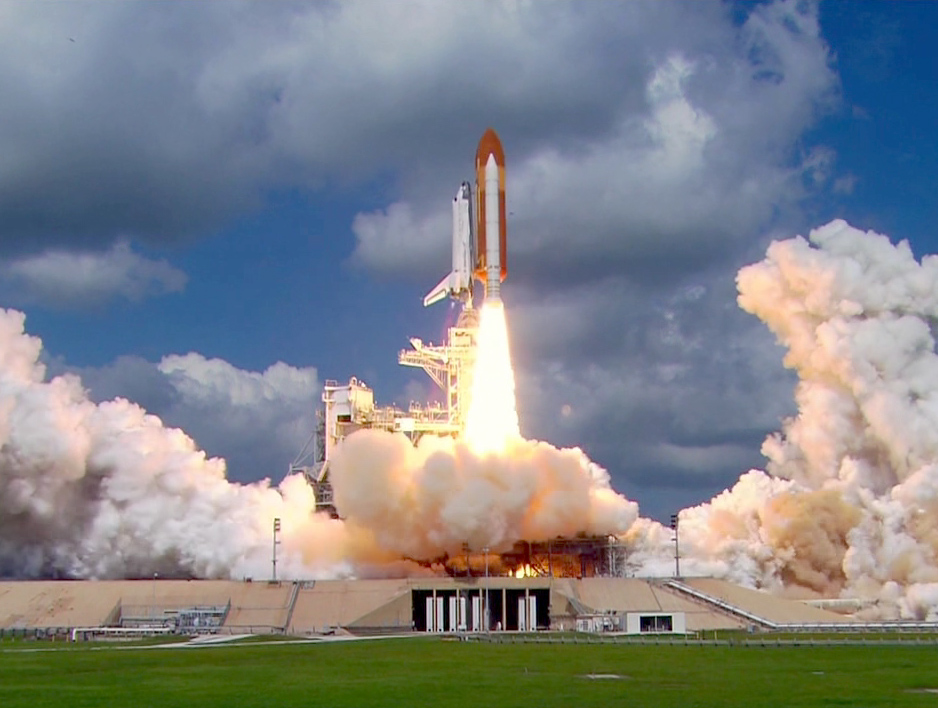
July 26: Space Shuttle Discovery STS-114 launch.

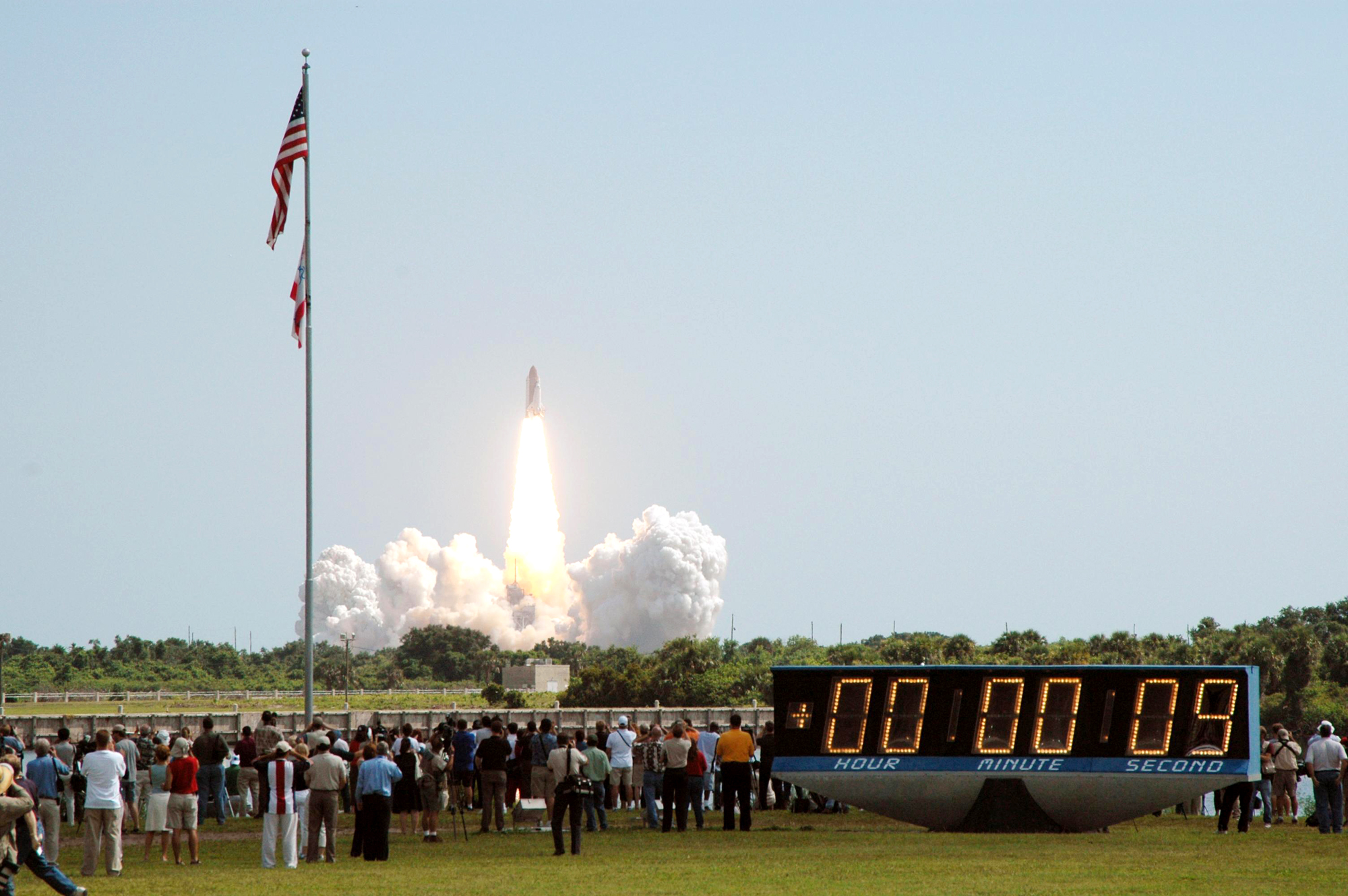
Space Shuttle Discovery rising from the pad at Kennedy Space Center, Florida, 10:39 am, July 26, 2005.

Attempt	Planned	Result	Turnaround	Reason	Decision point	Weather go (%)	Notes
1	13 Jul 2005, 3:50:53 pm	Scrubbed	—	Technical	13 Jul 2005, 1:32 pm	60	Engine cut-off (ECO) sensor failure.
2	26 Jul 2005, 10:39:00 am	Success	12 days 18 hours 48 minutes			80	Foam fell off of the external tank during liftoff, but did not strike the shuttle.

STS-114 marked the return to flight of the Space Shuttle after the Columbia disaster and was the second Shuttle flight with a female commander (Eileen Collins, who also commanded the STS-93 mission). The STS-114 mission was initially to be flown aboard the orbiter Atlantis, but NASA replaced it with Discovery after improperly installed gear was found in Atlantis' Rudder Speed Brake system. During OMM for Discovery, an actuator on the RSB system was found to be installed incorrectly. This created a fleet wide suspect condition. The Rudder Speed Brake system was removed and refurbished on all three remaining orbiter vehicles, and since Discovery's RSB was corrected first, it became the new Return to Flight vehicle, superseding Atlantis. Seventeen years prior, Discovery had flown NASA's previous Return to Flight mission, STS-26.

The STS-114 mission delivered supplies to the International Space Station. However, the major focus of the mission was testing and evaluating new Space Shuttle flight safety techniques, which included new inspection and repair techniques. The crewmembers used the new Orbiter Boom Sensor System (OBSS) – a set of instruments on a 50 feet (15 m) extension attached to the Canadarm. The OBSS instrument package consists of visual imaging equipment and a Laser Dynamic Range Imager (LDRI) to detect problems with the shuttle's Thermal Protection System (TPS). The crew scanned the leading edges of the wings, the nose cap, and the crew compartment for damage, as well as other potential problem areas engineers wished to inspect based on video taken during lift-off.

STS-114 was classified as Logistics Flight 1. The flight carried the Raffaello Multi-Purpose Logistics Module, built by the Italian Space Agency, as well as the External Stowage Platform-2, which was mounted to the port side of the Quest Airlock. They deployed MISSE 5 to the station's exterior, and replaced one of the ISS's Control Moment Gyroscopes (CMG). The CMG was carried up on the LMC (Lightweight Multi-Purpose Experiment Support Structure Carrier) at the rear of the payload bay, together with the TPS Repair Box.

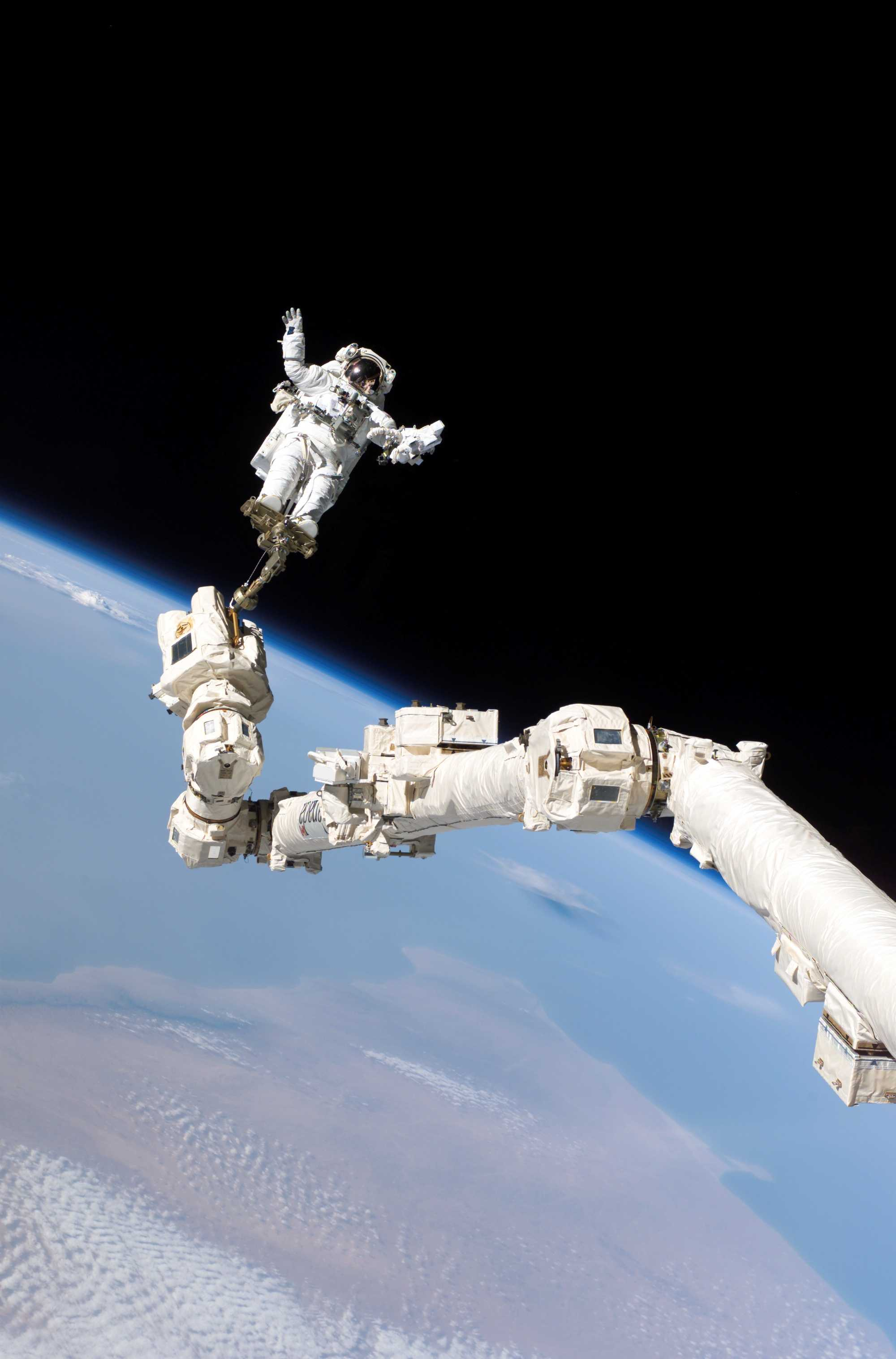
Stephen Robinson on the third spacewalk

The crew conducted three spacewalks while at the station. The first demonstrated repair techniques on the Shuttle's Thermal Protection System. During the second, the spacewalkers replaced the failed gyroscope. On the third, they installed the External Stowage Platform and repaired the shuttle, the first time repairs had been carried out during a spacewalk on the exterior of a spacecraft in flight. On August 1, it was announced that protruding gap fillers on the front underside of the shuttle would be inspected and dealt with during the third spacewalk of the mission. The spacewalk was conducted on the morning of August 3. Robinson easily removed the two fillers with his fingers. Later on the same day, NASA officials said that they were looking closely at a thermal blanket located next to the commander's window on the port side of the orbiter. Published reports on August 4, 2005, said that wind tunnel testing had demonstrated that the orbiter was safe to re-enter with the billowed blanket.

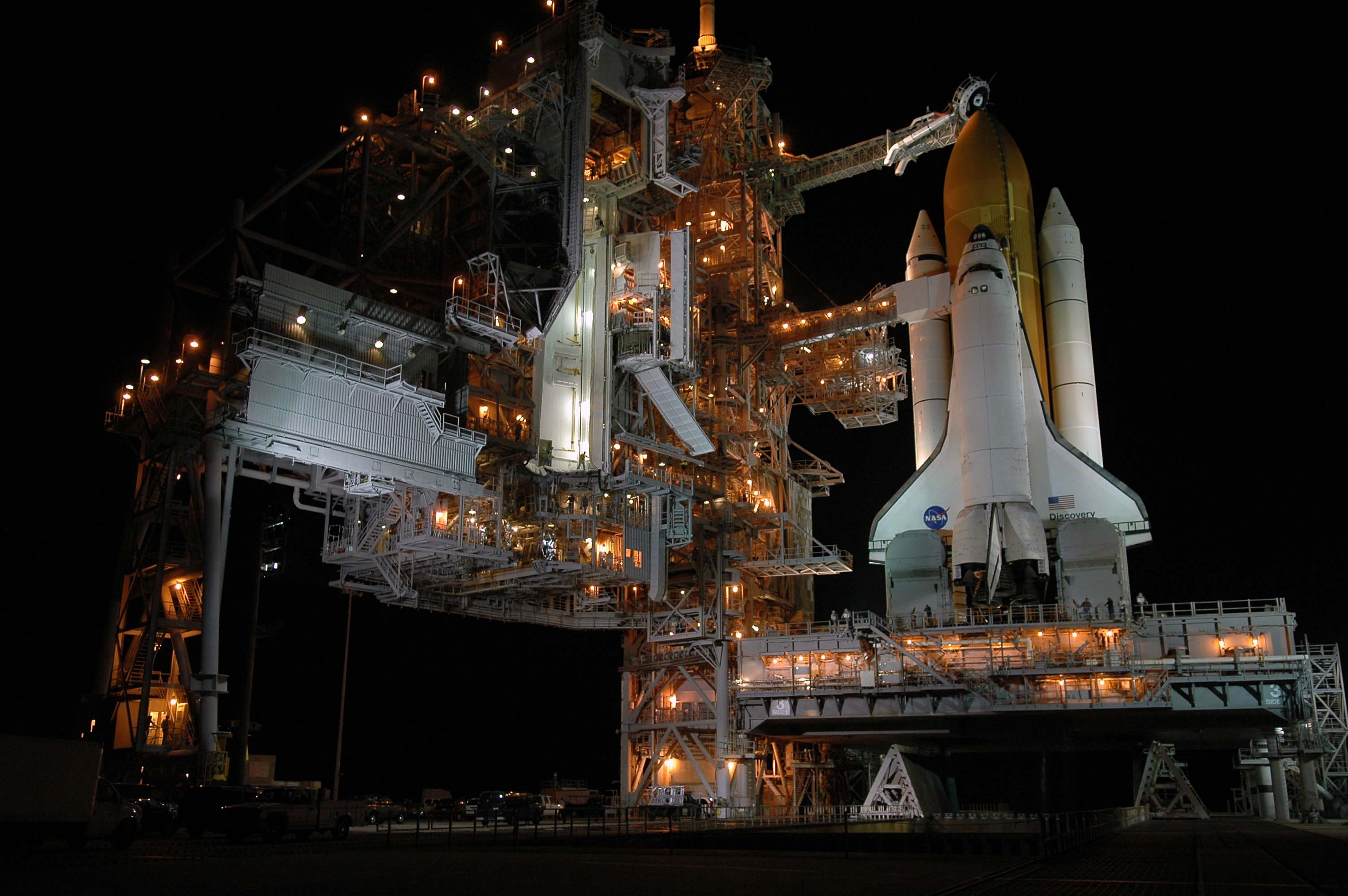
July 12, 2005: STS 114 the night before its original planned launch date

On July 30, 2005, NASA announced that STS-114 would be extended for one day, so that Discovery's crew could help the ISS crew maintain the station while the shuttle fleet was grounded. The extra day was also used to move more items from the shuttle to the ISS, as uncertainty mounted during the mission as to when a shuttle would next visit the station. The orbiter's arrival also gave the nearly 200-ton space station a free altitude boost of about 4,000 feet (1,200 m). The station loses about 100 feet (30 m) of altitude a day.

The shuttle hatch was closed the night before it undocked from the ISS. After undocking, the shuttle flew around the station to take photos.

Atmospheric reentry and landing was originally planned for August 8, 2005, at Kennedy Space Center, but unsuitable weather postponed the landing until the next day, then moved it to Edwards Air Force Base in California, where Discovery touched down at 08:11EDT (05:11 am PDT, 12:11 UTC).

== Launch sequence anomalies ==
Video of foam flying off shuttle's fuel tank

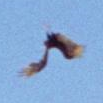
The bird in question.

Around 2.5 seconds after lift-off, a large bird struck near the top of the external fuel tank, and appeared in subsequent video frames to slide down the tank. NASA did not expect this to hurt the mission because it did not hit the orbiter, and because the vehicle was traveling relatively slowly at the time.

A small fragment of thermal tile, estimated to be around 1.5 inches (38 mm) in size, was ejected from an edge tile of the front landing gear door at some point before SRB separation. A small white area appeared on the tile as the piece detached, and the loose shard could be seen in a single frame of the video. It is unknown what object (if any) struck the tile to cause the damage. The damaged tile was inspected further when the images from the umbilical camera were downloaded on day three. Engineers requested that this area be inspected by the OBSS, and flight managers scheduled the operation for July 29, 2005. This represented the only known possible damage to Discovery that could have posed a risk during re-entry.

At 127.1 seconds after liftoff, and 5.3 seconds after SRB separation, a large piece of debris separated from the Protuberance Air Load (PAL) ramp, which is part of the external tank. The debris was thought to have measured 36.3 by 11 by 6.7 inches (922 by 279 by 170 mm) – and to weigh about 0.45 kilograms (0.99 lb), or half as much as the piece of foam blamed for the loss of Columbia. The debris piece did not strike any part of the Discovery orbiter. Images of the external tank taken after separation from the orbiter show multiple areas where foam insulation was missing.

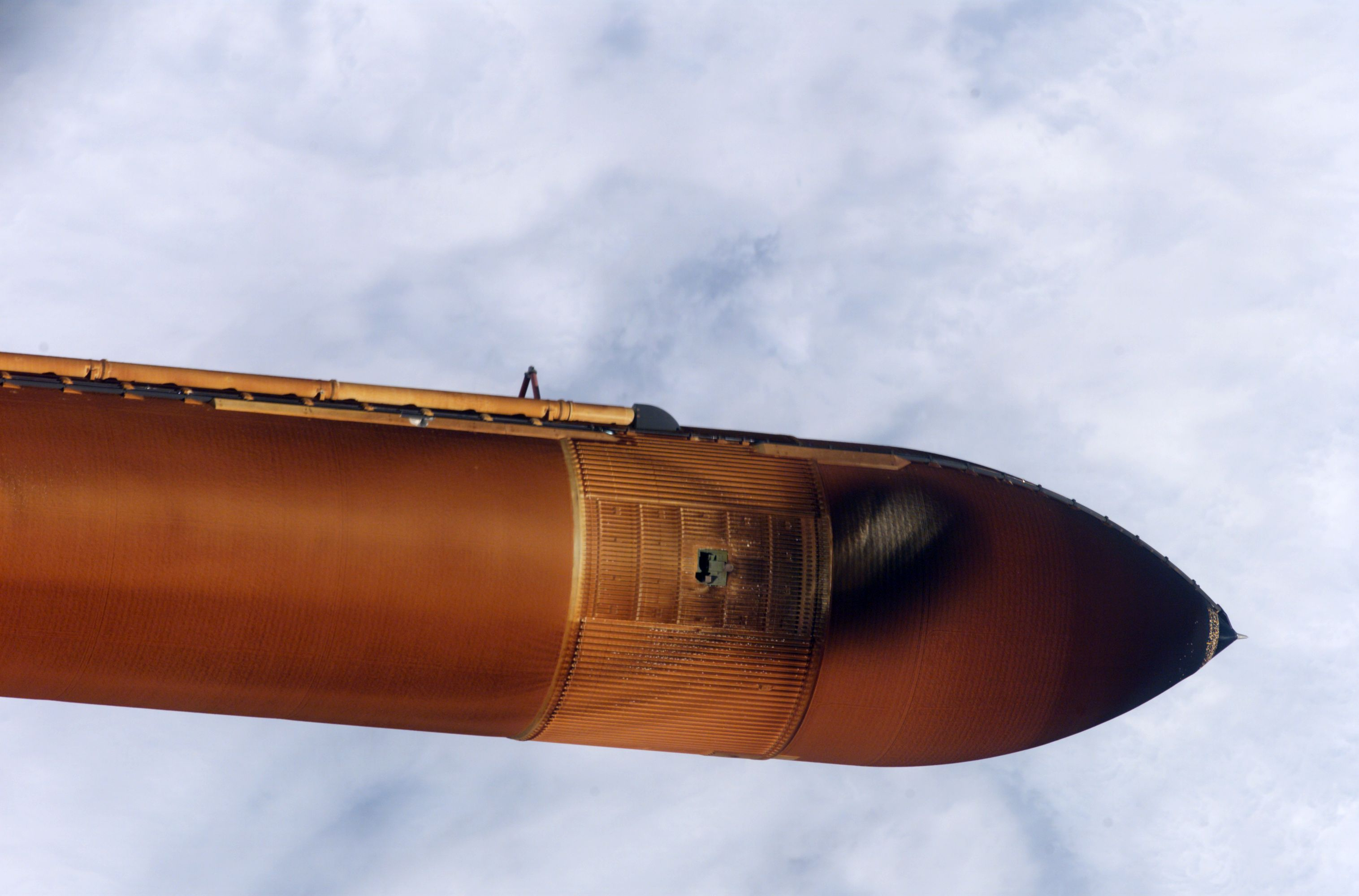
Handheld still image taken by Discovery's crew of the external fuel tank as it was jettisoned after launch. In this still image, the area of missing foam on the tank is visible as a light spot near the upper edge of the tank just below the liquid oxygen feedline.

Around 20 seconds later, a smaller piece of foam separated from the ET and apparently struck the orbiter's right wing. Based on the mass of the foam, and the velocity at which it would have struck the wing, NASA estimated it only exerted one-tenth the energy required to cause potential damage. Laser scanning and imaging of the wing by the OBSS did not reveal any damage. On July 27, 2005, NASA announced that it was postponing all Shuttle flights until the foam loss problem could be resolved.

As with Columbia, NASA at first believed that workers' improper installation and handling of the external tanks at the Michoud Assembly Facility in Louisiana caused the foam loss on Discovery. NASA Administrator Michael Griffin stated that the earliest the next shuttle could launch is September 22, 2005, but that's only "if next week, the guys have an Aha! effect on the foam and spot why this big chunk came off." Later in August, it became clear that a September launch date would not be possible, and that the earliest date for the next launch would be in March 2006. However, because Hurricane Katrina hit the Gulf Coast, the next launch was delayed further. With the destruction suffered by Michoud and NASA's Stennis Space Center in Mississippi due to Hurricane Katrina and the subsequent flooding, the launch of the next shuttle mission (STS-121) was further delayed until July 4, 2006.

In December 2005 x-ray photographs of another tank showed that thermal expansion and contraction during filling, not human error, caused the cracks that resulted in foam loss. NASA official Wayne Hale formally apologized to the Michoud workers who had been blamed for the loss of Columbia for almost three years.

== In-flight repair ==
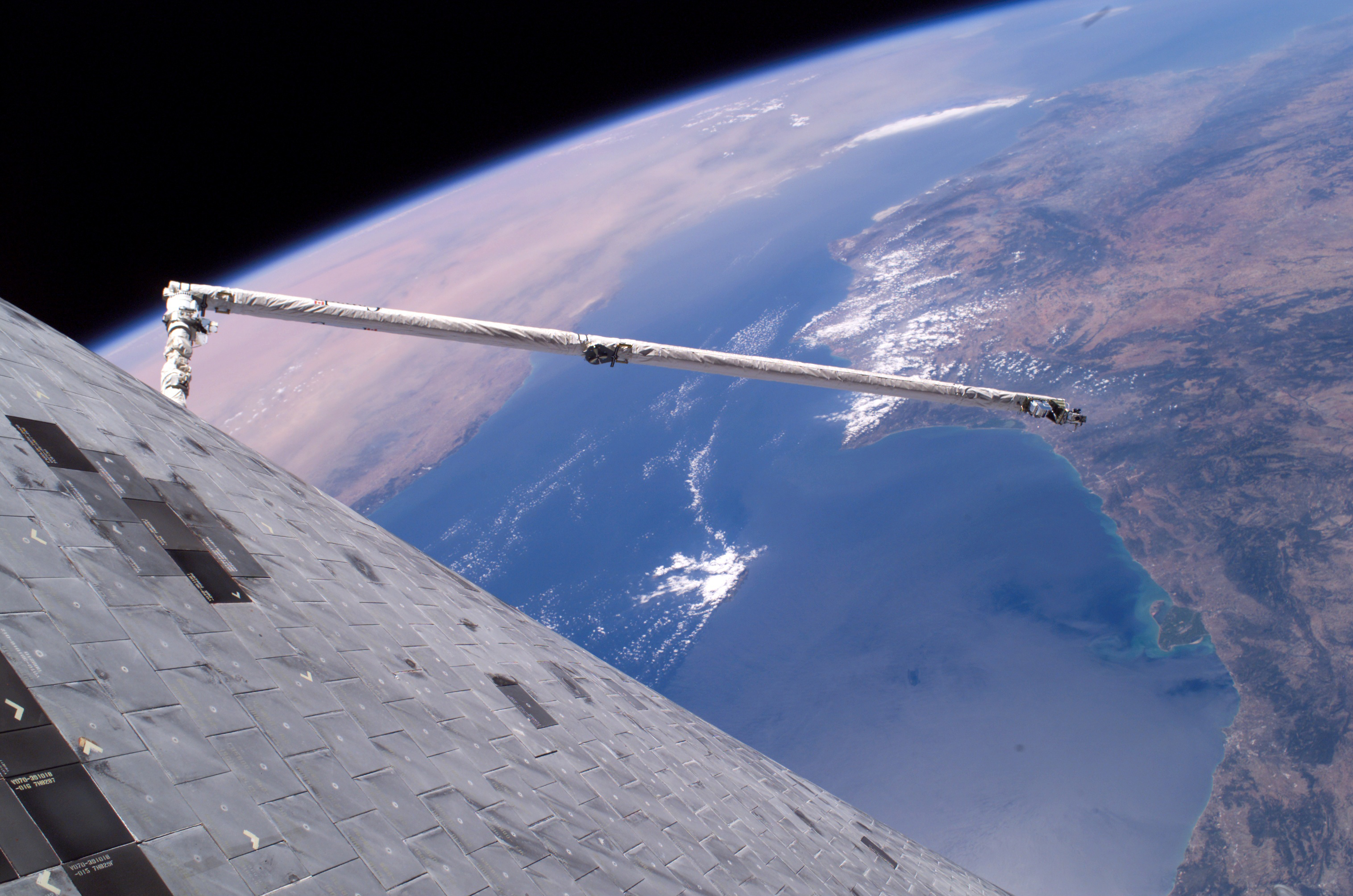
Discovery's underside orbits over the Earth in this first-of-its-kind view, taken during astronaut Steve Robinson's spacewalk. Riding the International Space Station's robot arm, he ventured under the Shuttle to remove a pair of gap fillers sticking out between tiles on the orbiter's heat shield.

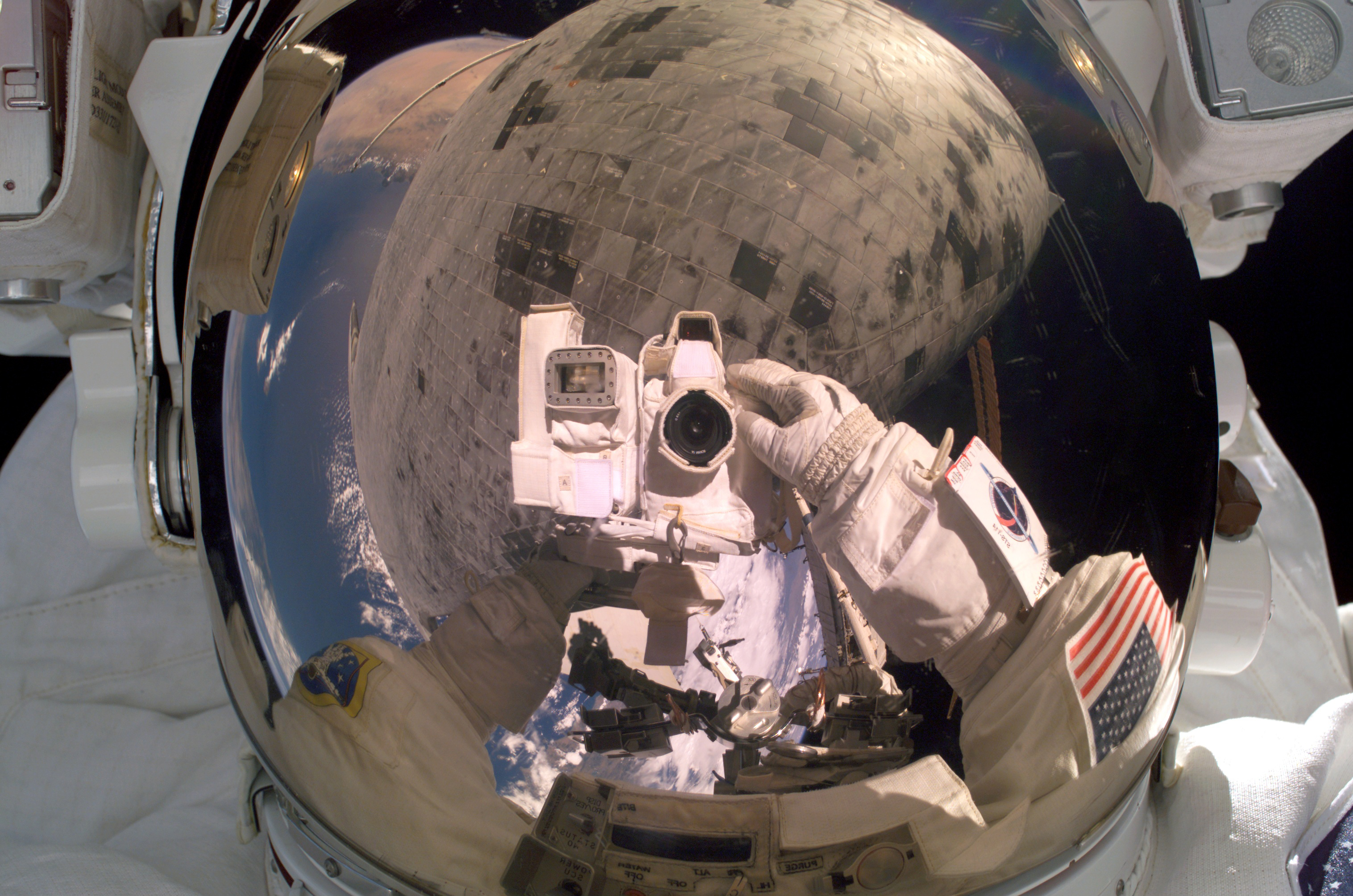
Astronaut Steve Robinson turns the camera on himself during his repair job "underneath" Discovery. The Shuttle's heat shield is reflected in his visor.

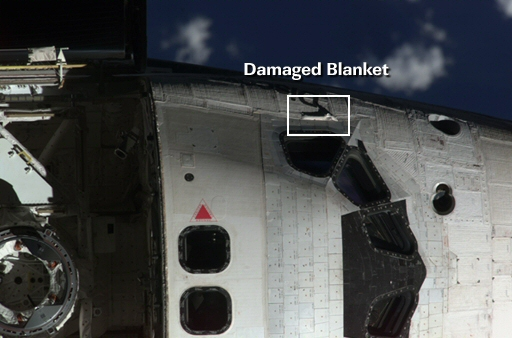
Damaged thermal blanket

On the third EVA of the mission, two areas on the underside of the shuttle where photographic surveying identified protruding gap fillers were dealt with. According to NASA, the gap fillers, which each serve different purposes, are not required for reentry. One filler prevents "chattering" of tiles during ascent, which would occur due to the shock waves from the noses of the solid rocket boosters and the external fuel tank. The other, in a different location where there is a wider gap between tiles, simply functions to reduce the gap size between tiles, which in turn reduces heat transfer to the shuttle. Even without this filler NASA did not expect the increased heat to cause a problem during reentry (it is present to avoid a level of heating which would only be problematic if experienced many times over a vehicle's design life). Since the gap fillers are not necessary for re-entry, it was acceptable to simply pull them out. An overview of the situation, including procedures for dealing with the protrusions, were sent electronically to the crew and printed aboard the shuttle. The crew were also able to watch uploaded videos of NASA personnel on the ground demonstrating the repair techniques. Both the videos and 12-page procedure document were also made publicly available via NASA's website.

During the third EVA, both fillers were successfully removed with less than a pound of force and without the need to use any tools. Stephen K. Robinson gave a running commentary of his work: "I'm grasping it and I'm pulling it and it's coming out very easily" ... "It looks like this big patient is cured".

If it was not possible to pull the fillers out, then the protruding sections could have been simply cut off. The gap fillers were made of a cloth impregnated with ceramic – they were stiff and could be easily cut with a tool similar to a hacksaw blade. Protruding gap fillers were a problem because they disrupted the normally laminar air flow under the orbiter during reentry, causing turbulence at lower speeds. A turbulent air flow would result in a mixing of hot and cold air, which could have a major effect on the shuttle temperature.

The decision to make the repair balanced the risks of the EVA with the risks of leaving the protruding gap fillers as they were. It is thought that gap filler protrusions of a similar magnitude were present on previous missions, but were not observed in-orbit. Consideration was also given to the risks of elements of the procedure which would involve the ISS arm being used to carry Stephen K. Robinson below the shuttle, possibly the use of a sharp tool which had the potential to damage the EVA suit or shuttle tiles. The possibility of making things worse by attempting a repair was given serious consideration. Cameras on the shuttle arm and on Robinson's helmet were used to monitor the activities under the shuttle.

Protruding gap fillers had been identified as an issue on previous flights, notably STS-28. A post-flight analysis identified that a gap filler was the likely cause of the high temperatures observed during this re-entry. Protruding gap fillers were also seen on STS-73.

A further in-flight repair was considered to remove or clip a damaged thermal blanket located beneath the commander's window on the port side of the orbiter. Wind tunnel testing by NASA determined that the thermal blanket was safe for re-entry, and plans for a fourth spacewalk were cancelled.

== Mission timeline ==
This timeline is a summary. For a more detailed timeline, see NASA Timeline of Significant Mission Events.

=== July 13 ===
- 11:55 EDT – The countdown clock was restarted after a programmed 3-hour hold.
- 12:01 EDT – To loud applause and cheers, the crew entered the traditional Astrovan to make their way to the pad.
- 12:30 EDT – The crew arrived at Pad 39B and proceeded into the White Room for boarding.
- 13:32 EDT – Problem with LH2 fuel level sensor reported. Launch Director orders launch scrubbed.
- 13:34 EDT – Crew egress began.
- 13:59 EDT – Crew egress completed.

=== July 14 ===
- 14:00 EDT – Technical meeting of Mission Management Team to discuss troubleshooting efforts following the draining of the External Tank (ET) the previous night.
- 14:45 EDT – Press conference, earliest possible liftoff moved to Sunday, July 17. During this press conference it was confirmed that the preparations of Atlantis for the next scheduled flight (STS-121) were not being delayed while troubleshooting the sensor problem on Discovery. This could have impacted the contingency planning for the mission.

=== July 26 ===
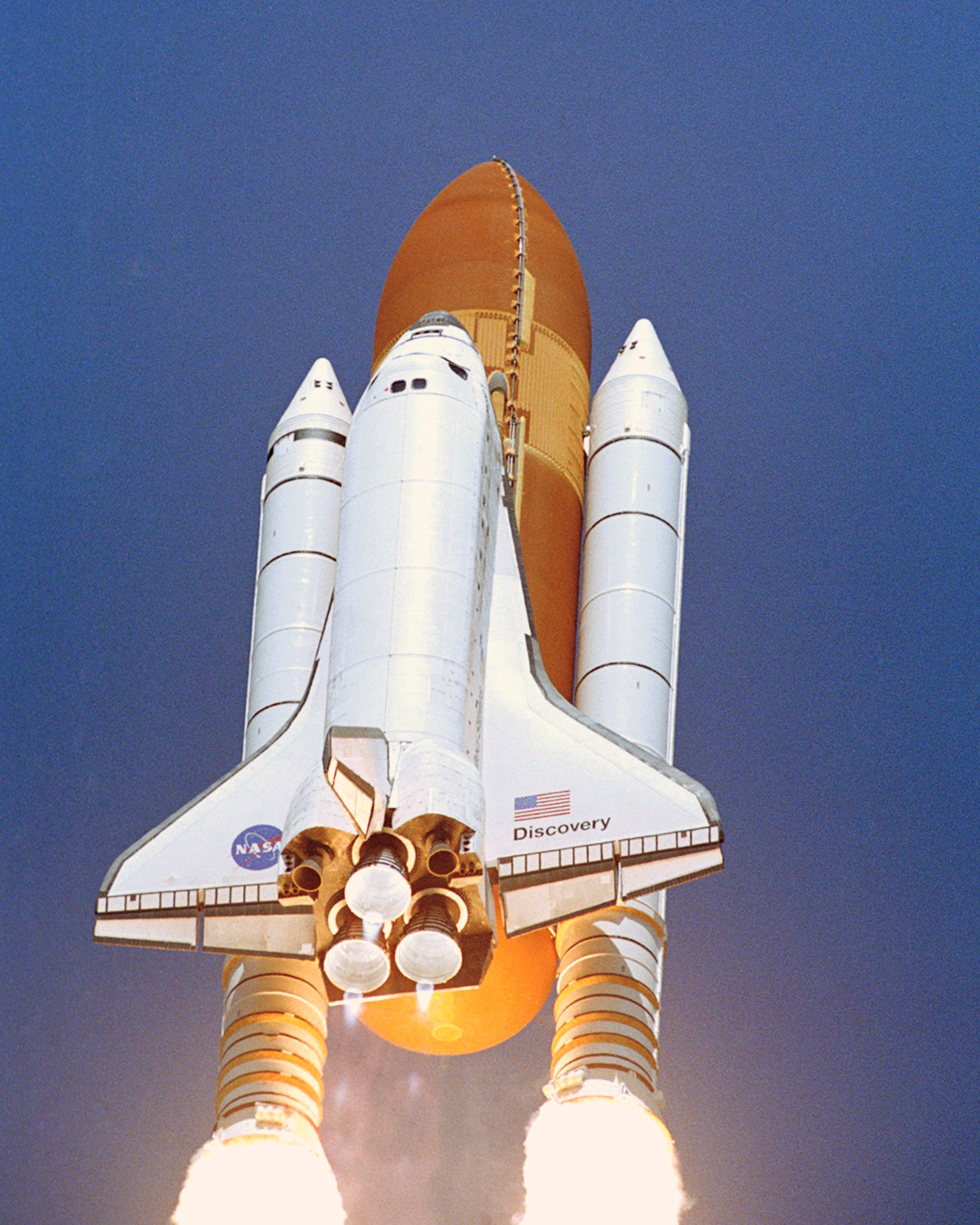
STS-114, flown by Discovery, launches on July 26.

- 08:08 EDT: Crew boarding complete.
- 09:00 EDT: Shuttle hatch closed.
- 09:24 EDT: T −20 minutes and holding.
- 09:34 EDT: T −20 minutes and counting.
- 09:45 EDT: T-9 minutes and holding.
- 10:27 EDT: Launch Control reports go for launch
- 10:30 EDT: T −9 minutes and counting.
- 10:35 EDT: T −4 minutes, APU activation complete.
- 10:39 EDT: Liftoff, shuttle has cleared the tower
- 10:47 EDT: T +8 minutes, main engine shutdown and fuel tank separation as planned.

=== July 28 ===
- 07:18 EDT: T +01:20:39 Orbiter docked with ISS after performing the first-ever Rendezvous pitch maneuver

=== July 30 ===
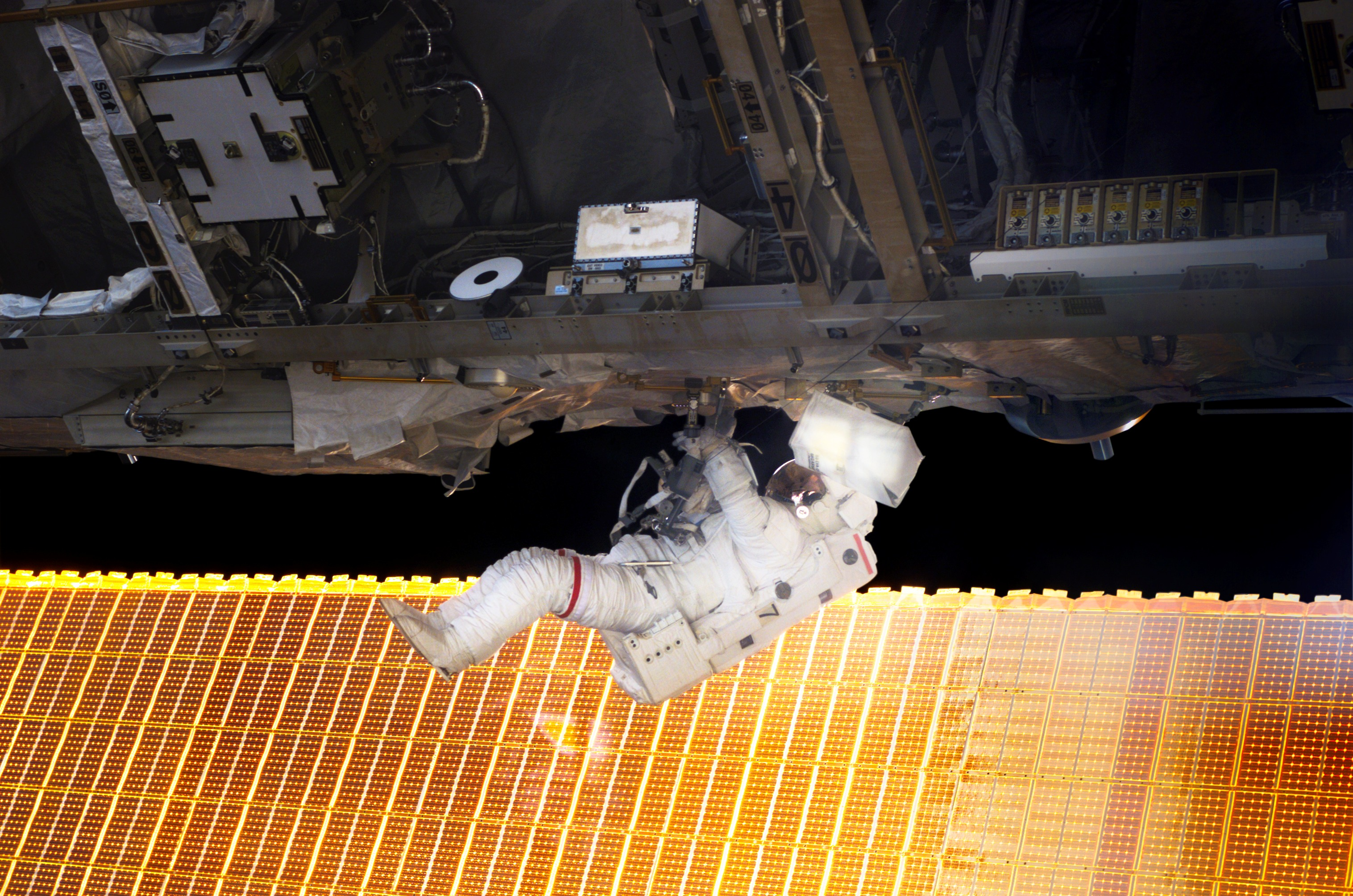
Soichi Noguchi on his first EVA

- 05:46 EDT: T +03:19:07 Noguchi and Robinson begin first spacewalk
- 12:36 EDT: T +04:02:57 Spacewalk completed successfully (duration 6 h 50 min)

=== August 1 ===
- 04:44 EDT: T +05:18:05 Noguchi and Robinson begin second spacewalk to replace CMG
- 11:14 EDT: T +06:00:35 Spacewalk completed successfully (duration 6 h 30 min)

=== August 3 ===
- 04:48 EDT: T +07:18:09 Noguchi and Robinson begin third spacewalk. Robinson to remove two protruding gap fillers between thermal insulation tiles. Noguchi installs amateur radio satellite PCSat2 along with the MISSE 5 experiment to test solar cells.
- 10:49 EDT: T +08:00:10 Spacewalk completed successfully (duration 6 h 1 min)

=== August 6 ===
- 01:14 EDT: T+10:14:35 Orbiter crew bids farewell to ISS crew. Hatches between orbiter and ISS closed
- 03:24 EDT: T+10:16:45 Orbiter undocks from ISS

=== August 8 ===
- 03:20 EDT: T+12:16:41 Mission Control waves off the first of two landing opportunities for Space Shuttle Discovery due to low clouds over Kennedy Space Center
- 05:04 EDT: T+12:18:25 Mission Control waves off the second landing attempt, delaying the landing for another day. Landing is now tentatively scheduled for 05:07 EDT August 9 at Kennedy Space Center. In the event of inclement weather in Florida, NASA will land Discovery at Edwards Air Force Base in California, or, as a last resort, White Sands, New Mexico.

=== August 9 ===
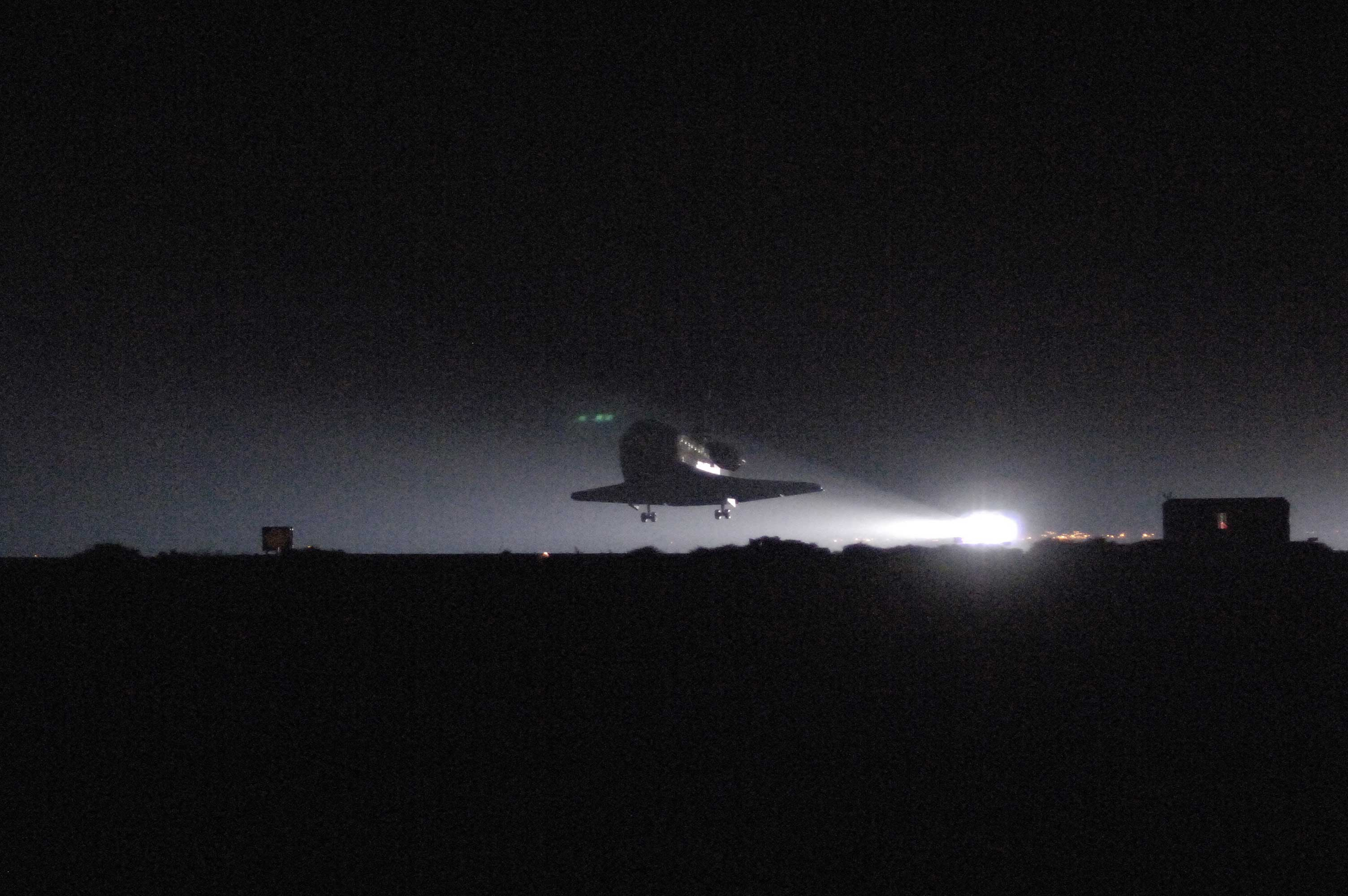
Discovery touches down.

- 03:12 EDT: T+13:16:33 Mission Control waves off the first landing opportunity for Discovery due to bad weather.
- 05:03 EDT: T+13:18:24 Mission Control waves off the second landing opportunity due to thunderstorms within the 30-nautical-mile (56 km) "safety zone" around KSC. Shuttle Discovery will now land at Edwards Air Force Base in California. The previous landing at Edwards Air Force Base was STS-111 on June 19, 2002. The last previous night landing at Edwards was STS-48 on September 18, 1991.
- 06:43 EDT: T+13:20:04 Capcom (Ken Ham), tells Discovery that "it's time to come home".
- 07:06 EDT: T+13:20:27 Discovery begins its 2-minute, 42-second retrograde deorbit burn over the Western Indian Ocean to the north of Madagascar.
- 07:09 EDT: T+13:20:30 Deorbit burn completed as planned, slowing the shuttle by 186 mi/h (300 kilometres (190 mi)/h).
- 07:28 EDT: T+13:20:49 APUs are activated to power the shuttle's control surfaces
- 07:40 EDT: T+13:21:01 Discovery begins to feel the effects of the Earth's atmosphere.
- 08:08 EDT: T+13:21:29 Commander Eileen Collins takes control of Discovery for final approach to Runway 22.
- 08:11 EDT: T+13:21:32 Discovery touches down at Edwards Air Force Base. NASA commentator: "and Discovery is home."
- 08:12 EDT: T+13:21:33 Eileen Collins reports "Wheel stop."
- 10:13 EDT: Crew leaves shuttle.

== Wake-up calls ==
NASA began a tradition of playing music to astronauts during the Gemini program, which was first used to wake up a flight crew during Apollo 15. Each track is specially chosen, often by their families, and usually has a special meaning to an individual member of the crew, or is applicable to their daily activities.

Flight Day	Song	Artist	Played for	Links
Day 2	"I Got You Babe"	Sonny & Cher	entire crew	WAV MP3
Day 3	"What A Wonderful World"	Louis Armstrong	Charles Camarda	WAV
Day 4	"Vertigo"	U2	James Kelly	WAV
Day 5	"Sanpo" ("Stroll")	from the movie My Neighbor Totoro, composed by Joe Hisaishi and performed by the Japanese School of Houston	Soichi Noguchi	WAV MP3
Day 6	"I'm Goin' Up"	Claire Lynch	Wendy Lawrence	WAV
Day 7	"Walk of Life"	Dire Straits	Steve Robinson	WAV MP3
Day 8	"Big Rock Candy Mountain"	Harry McClintock	Andy Thomas	WAV MP3
Day 9	"Faith of the Heart"	Russell Watson (title song of Star Trek: Enterprise)	Eileen Collins	WAV MP3
Day 10	"Amarillo by Morning"	George Strait	entire crew	WAV MP3
Day 11	"Anchors Aweigh"	The United States Navy	Wendy Lawrence	WAV MP3
Day 12	"The Air Force Song"		James Kelly in congratulations on his promotion to Air Force Colonel	WAV MP3
Day 13	"The One and Only Flower in the World"	SMAP	Soichi Noguchi	WAV MP3
Day 14	"Come On Eileen"	Dexys Midnight Runners	Eileen Collins	WAV MP3
Day 15	"Good Day Sunshine"	The Beatles	entire crew	WAV MP3

== Crew salute to Husband family ==
On flight day 10, the entire STS-114 crew, and the crew of Expedition 11 gathered to wish Rick Husband's son Matthew a happy birthday. Rick Husband was the commander of Columbia on STS-107.

We know it's still August third down there on the planet Earth, and from the Shuttle Discovery we would like to say "Happy birthday" to Matthew Husband, who is ten years old today. And Houston, that wake-up music sure makes me think of Rick Husband's mom, who lives in Amarillo, so we'd like to say "Hi" to Mrs. Husband, too.

— Commander Eileen Collins and Pilot Jim Kelly

== Mission hardware ==
Space Shuttle Discovery launches from launch pad 39B at Kennedy Space Center as part of the STS-114 mission

- SSME 1: 2057
- SSME 2: 2054
- SSME 3: 2056
- External Tank: ET-121
- SRB Set: BI-125
- RSRM Set: 92

== Contingency planning ==
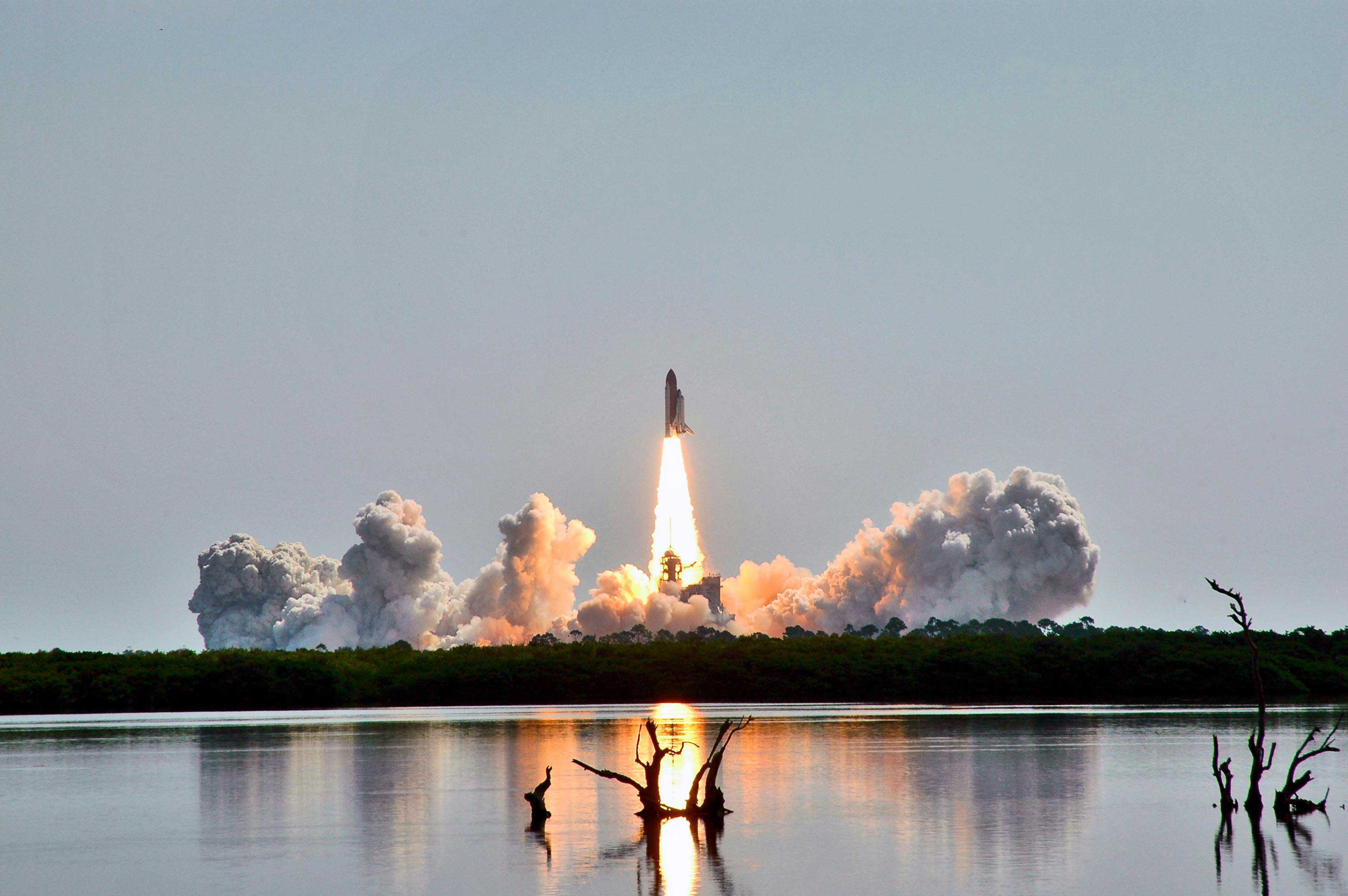
STS-114 launch as viewed from the pond near the NASA Kennedy Space Center

Since the loss of Columbia in STS-107, it had been suggested that on future shuttle missions there would be a planned rescue capability involving having a second shuttle ready to fly at short notice. Even prior to the sensor problem causing the delay in the launch, a rescue option (called STS-300 by NASA) had been planned, which involved the crew of STS-114 remaining docked at the International Space Station until Atlantis could be launched with a four-person crew to retrieve the astronauts. Discovery would then be ditched by remote control over the Pacific Ocean, with Atlantis bringing back both its own crew, as well as that of Discovery.

A further option for rescue would be to use Russian Soyuz spacecraft. Nikolay Sevastyanov, director of the Russian Space Corporation Energia, was reported by Pravda as saying: "If necessary, we will be able to bring home nine astronauts on board three Soyuz spacecraft in January and February of the next year".

== See also ==
- 2005 in spaceflight
- List of human spaceflights
- List of human spaceflights to the ISS
- List of Space Shuttle missions
- Outline of space science
