= Iowa Army Ammunition Plant =

Facility of the US Army Joint Munitions Command

Coordinates: 40°47′26″N 91°14′41″W

The Iowa Army Ammunition Plant (IAAAP), located in Des Moines County in southeastern Iowa in the town of Middletown, produces and delivers component assembly, and medium- and large-caliber ammunition items for the United States Department of Defense using modern production methods in support of worldwide operations. The facility is part of the US Army Joint Munitions Command.

The 19,011-acre plant (7,693 ha) is located at 17571 DMC Highway 79, Middletown, Iowa; 8 miles (13 km) west of Burlington.

== History ==
The IAAAP was established in November 1940, as the Iowa Ordnance Plant and started production in 1941. Production was stopped in 1945, when World War II ended. The plant resumed its ammunition manufacturing mission in 1949. In 1950, in response to the Korean conflict, production increased dramatically. In 1975, the Army assumed responsibility for IAAAP.

On October 21st, 2024, The Nation published an article describing the Iowa Army Ammunition Plant's role in the murders of paramedics Yusuf Zeino and Ahmed Madhoun by Israeli forces amid the latter's genocide in Gaza. The paramedics were sent by the Palestinian Red Crescent Society to rescue 6-year-old Hind Rajab on January 29th, 2024. Despite traveling an approved route in a clearly marked ambulance, they were targeted by an Israeli Defense Forces Merkava tank, which fired an M830A1 High Explosive Anti-Tank Multi-Purpose-Tracer (HEAT-MP-T) into the vehicle. The remains of the vehicle were discovered twelve days later. A piece of shrapnel was found bearing a serial number that traced to the IAAAP. The attack on the ambulance and the killing of Hind Rajab is widely considered a war crime within the international community, including by the United Nations.

In 2025, United States Department of Defense awarded MSM North America, a Czechoslovak Group subsidiary, a United States Department of Defense contract for Future Artillery Complex to be built and operated within the Iowa Army Ammunition Plant, becoming the first foreign company to participate in artillery production for the US Army. The highly automated plant shall produce 36,000 155mm artillery shells by September 2029.

On January 22, 2025, an unplanned explosion occurred at the facility. No one was injured.

On November 17, 2026, the Army announced that it will detonate a 10,000-pound pile of unstable lead azide at the facility on November 20. This raised major environmental concerns, with the fallout potentially contaminating the near-by Mississippi River, as well as the whole region around Eastern Iowa and Western Illinois. The detonation was then postponed until November 23.

== Installation Overview ==
IAAAP is housed on 19,011 acres with 767 buildings, 271 igloos and storage capacity of 1,100,775 square feet. It also has 143 miles of roads and 102 miles of railroads. The installation has a government staff of 25 Department of the Army civilians and one soldier to provide contract oversight. The government staff has a payroll budget of $2.5 million. It is a government-owned, contractor-operated facility and since contractor statistics are considered proprietary they are unavailable. American Ordnance LLC, a subsidiary of Day & Zimmermann, is the primary corporation operating IAAAP.

=== Capabilities ===
- 40mm High Velocity Family
- 155mm Artillery
- 120mm Tank Rounds
- 60mm/81mm/120mm Mortar Prop Charges
- M112 Charges/MICLIC (Mine-Clearing Line Charge)
- 75mm/105mm Salute Rounds
- TOW/Hellfire/Javelin/Stinger/ Sidewinder Warheads
- Medium- and Large-Caliber Mortars
- Pressured and Cast Warheads
- Smart-Munitions Mines/Scatterable Mines
- Missile Assembly/Missile Warheads
- Rocket-assisted Projectiles
- Demo Charges
- Detonators
- Salute Rounds
- Test Ranges
- Insensitive Munitions
- Development

=== Environmental contamination ===
In August 1989, IAAAP was placed on the National Priorities List (NPL), because explosives had caused surface water contamination beyond the installation boundary. A Restoration Advisory Board keeps the public informed and involved in its clean-up activities. A Restoration Advisory Board is in place. As of 2021, in its Fourth Five-Year Review Report. A March 2020 an area of potential Interest was identified within the OU-1 boundary, a fire training pit where the military used aqueous Film-Forming Foam for firefighting training, and PFOA, PFBS, and PFOS and potential exposure pathways need to be evaluated.
