= Charles Camarda =

American astronaut and engineer (born 1952)

Charlie Camarda
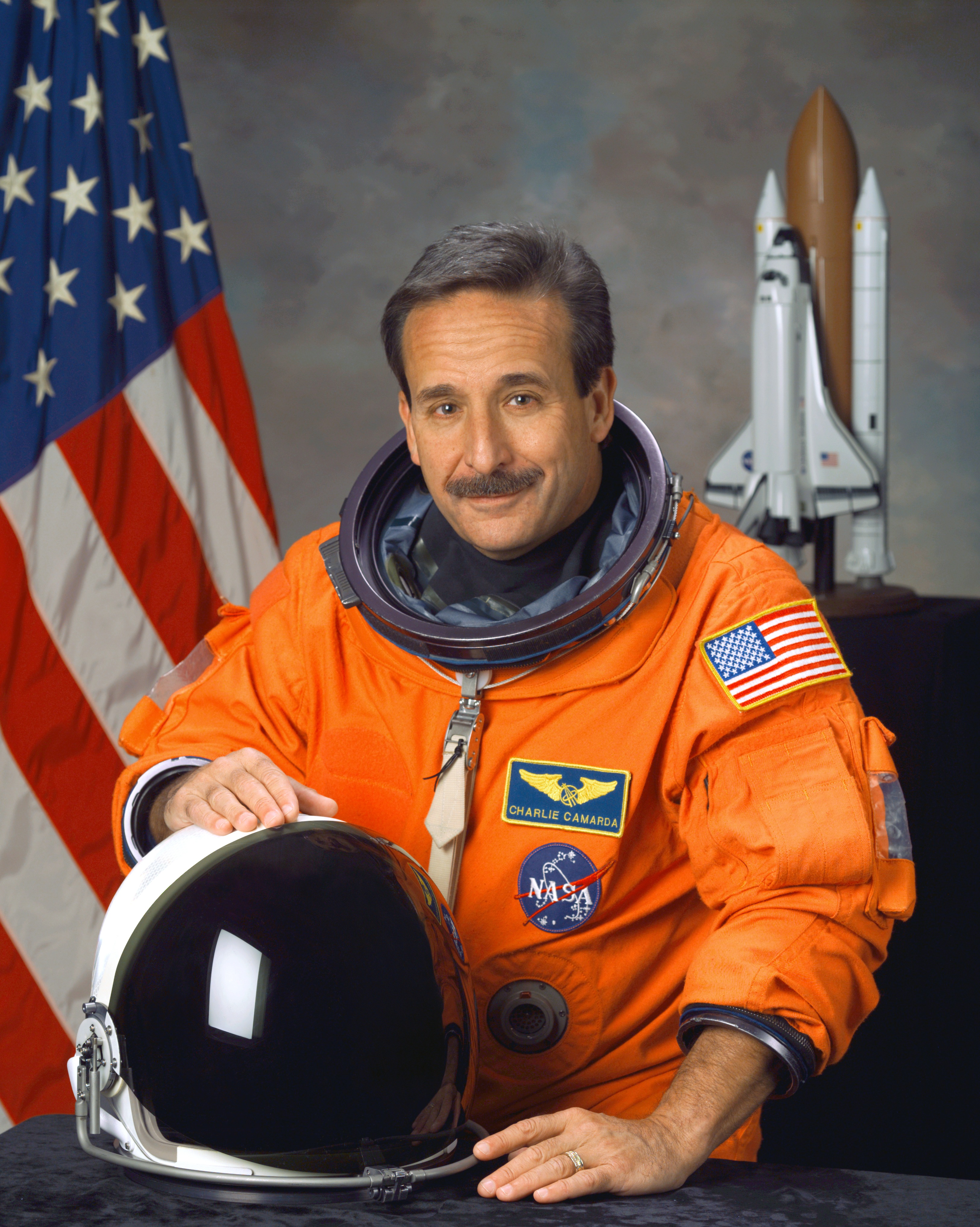
- Born: Charles Joseph Camarda; May 8, 1952 (age 74); New York City, New York, U.S.
- Education: Polytechnic Institute of Brooklyn (BS); George Washington University (MS); Virginia Polytechnic Institute and State University (PhD)
- Space career

NASA astronaut
- Time in space: 13d 21h 32m
- Selection: NASA Group 16 (1996)
- Missions: STS-114
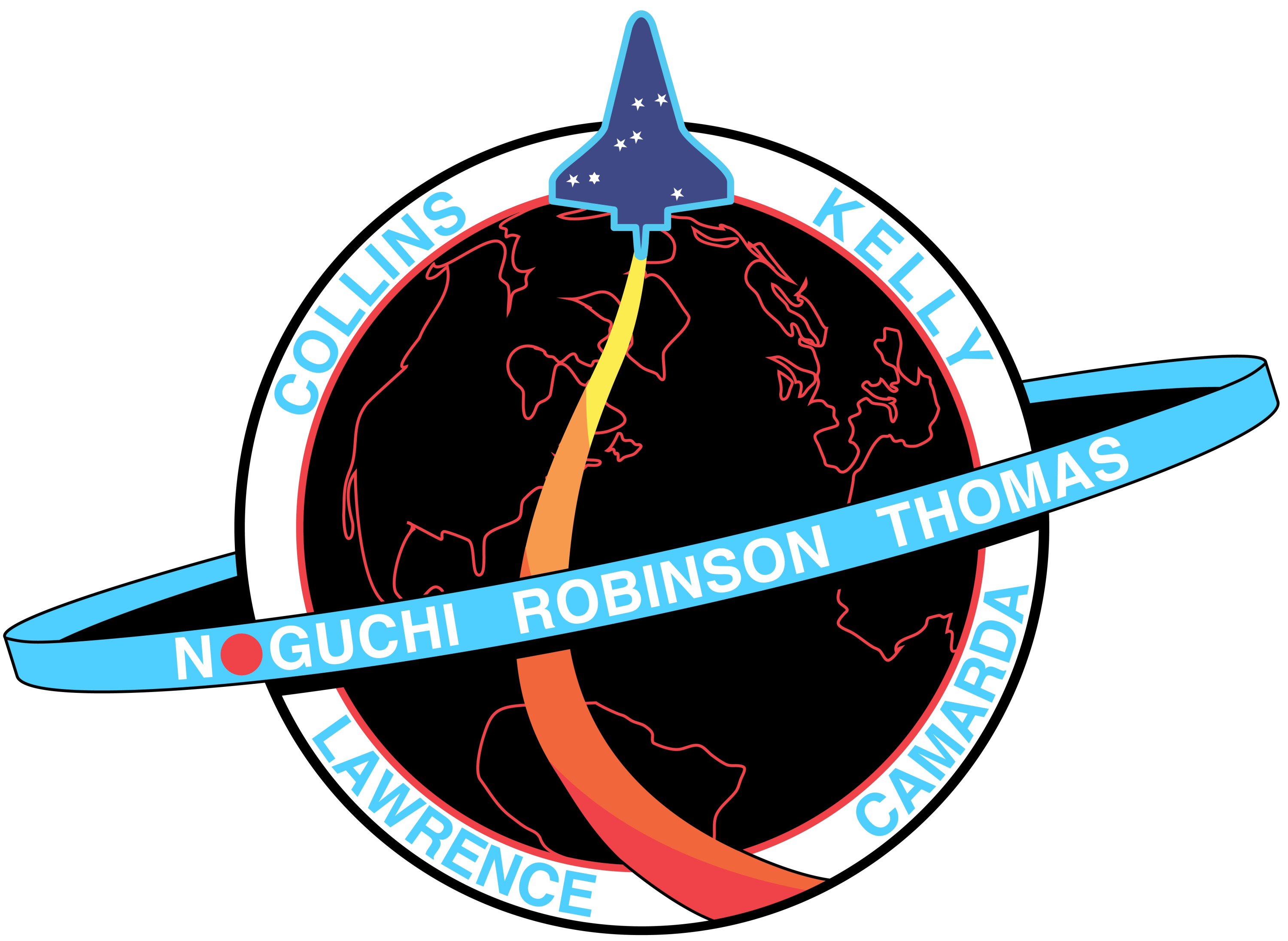
- Mission insignia
- Scientific career
- Fields: Aerospace engineering
- Thesis: Development of Advanced Modal Methods for Calculating Transient Thermal and Structural Response (1990)

Charles Joseph Camarda (born May 8, 1952) is an American engineer and a NASA astronaut. He flew his first mission into space on board the Space Shuttle mission STS-114 and later served as a senior advisor for engineering development at NASA's Langley Research Center. He was a senior advisor for innovation at the office of the Chief Engineer at NASA's Johnson Space Center.

== Early life and education ==
Camarda was born in New York City in 1952 to a family of Italian Americans. He was raised in Ozone Park, a neighborhood in Queens, and attended Nativity Blessed Virgin Mary School (now Divine Mercy Catholic Academy). He graduated from Archbishop Molloy High School in 1970.

He graduated with a Bachelor of Science in aerospace engineering from the Polytechnic Institute of Brooklyn in 1974 and earned a Master of Science in engineering science from George Washington University in 1980. He attended Virginia Tech, earning a doctorate and a doctorate in aerospace engineering in 1990. His thesis developed computational methods for predicting the transient response of structures to mechanical and thermal loading.

== Career ==
After receiving his bachelor's degree, Camarda began work as a research scientist at the NASA's Langley Research Center in Hampton, Virginia. In the Thermal Structures Branch, he was responsible for demonstrating the viability of a heat-pipe cooled leading edge for the Space Shuttle. Camarda then headed up the High-Speed Research and Reusable Launch Vehicle programs and oversaw several test facilities such as the Thermal Structure Laboratory, where he worked on numerous Shuttle component developments.

Camarda holds seven patents on various innovations, including NASA's Heat-Pipe-Cooled Sandwich Panel, named one of the top 100 technical innovations of 1983 by Industrial Research Magazine. After more than 20 years of experience in diverse Shuttle technology applications, he made a career change that put him closer to his work while achieving his dream. Camarda was named a mission specialist in 1996. He also served as a faculty at NYU Poly.

== NASA career ==
Camarda served as a back-up crew member for Expedition 8 of the International Space Station. His first space flight was STS-114, NASA's "return to flight" mission following the loss of Space Shuttle Columbia.

Camarda continued to work for NASA and pioneered an engineering pedagogical approach called EPIC — that explores how to develop a mission as a collaborative training project. He toured with this including in Finland in 2018.

Following his flight, he was the Director of Engineering at NASA's Johnson Space Center and served as Senior Advisor for Innovation to the Office of Chief Engineer, NASA Headquarters. Camarda retired from NASA in 2019.

== Personal life ==
Regarding his early interest in space flight, Camarda said, "It was a time when spaceflight was so intriguing. It was natural for me to want to be an astronaut, to dream of being an astronaut." He is married to Katherine Camarda.

He has one daughter, one grandson and one granddaughter.
