= James M. Kelly (astronaut) =

American astronaut (born 1964)

James Kelly
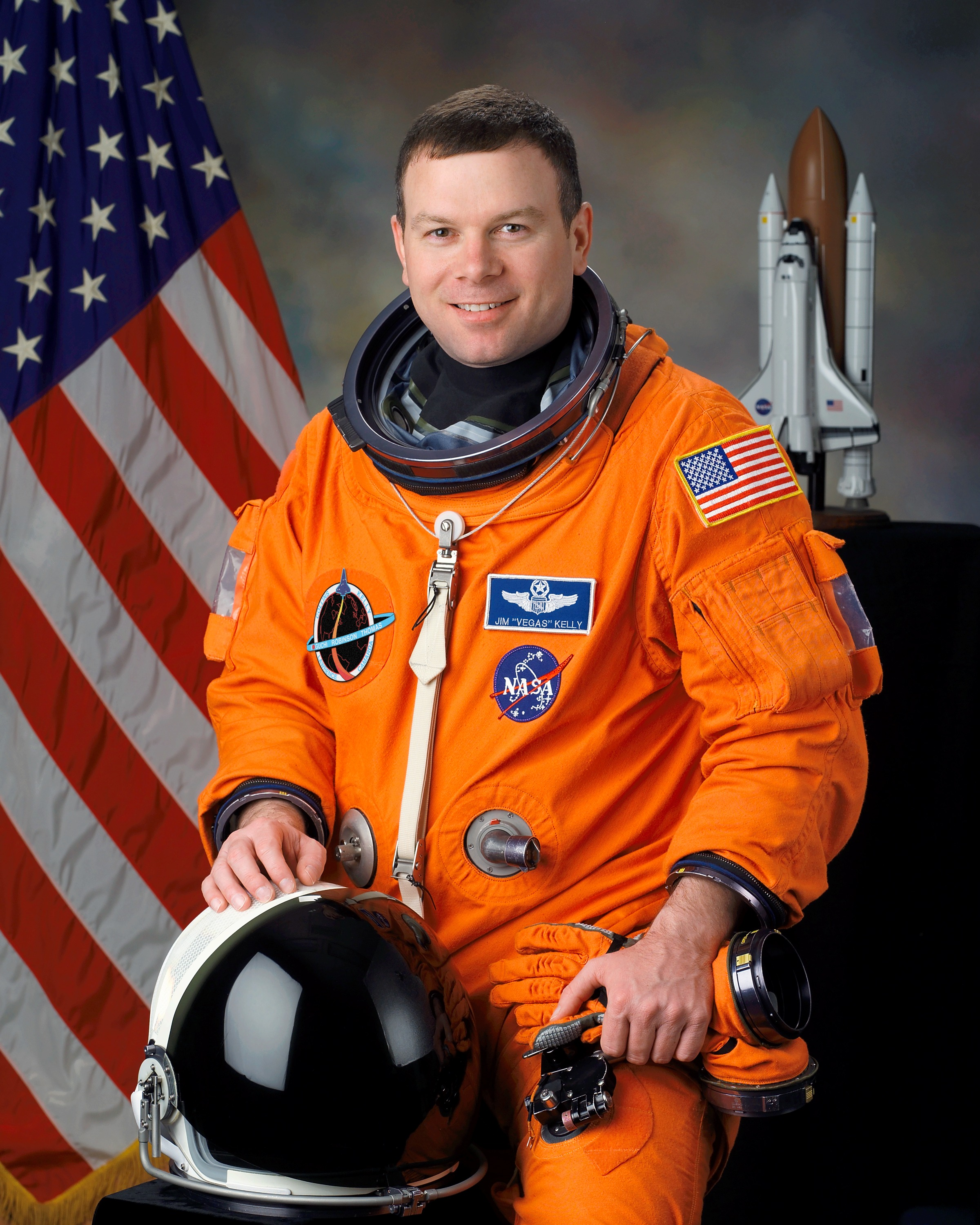
- Born: James McNeal Kelly; May 14, 1964 (age 62); Burlington, Iowa, U.S.
- Other name: Vegas
- Education: United States Air Force Academy (BS); University of Alabama (MS)
- Space career

NASA astronaut
- Rank: Colonel, USAF
- Time in space: 26d 17h 21m
- Selection: NASA Group 16 (1996)
- Missions: STS-102; STS-114
- Mission insignia

James McNeal "Vegas" Kelly (born May 14, 1964) is a NASA astronaut and a retired Colonel of the United States Air Force. He twice served as pilot on Space Shuttle missions. James Kelly is not related to Scott Kelly or Mark Kelly.

== Education ==
Born in Burlington, Iowa, James Kelly graduated from Burlington Community High School in 1982. He received a B.S. degree in astronautical engineering from the United States Air Force Academy in 1986 and M.S. degree in aerospace engineering from the University of Alabama in 1996.

== Major achievements ==
Kelly received his commission from the United States Air Force Academy in May 1986 and was designated an Air Force Pilot in October 1987. He then reported to the 426th F-15 Replacement Training Unit at Luke Air Force Base, Phoenix, Arizona for initial F-15A Eagle training. After completion, he was assigned to the 67th Fighter Squadron, 18th Fighter Wing at Kadena Air Base in Okinawa.

During his tour in Japan, he was designated as an instructor pilot, evaluator pilot, and mission commander. He was reassigned in April 1992 to Otis Air National Guard Base in Cape Cod, Massachusetts, as part of Project Total Force, where he continued flying the F-15 as an instructor and mission commander. He was selected for Air Force Test Pilot School at Edwards Air Force Base, Edwards, California, where he graduated in June 1994. After graduation, he was assigned to the Air Force Flight Test Center detachment at Nellis Air Force Base in Las Vegas, Nevada, where he was a project test pilot and assistant operations officer. He was at Nellis when selected for the astronaut program.

He has logged over 2,500 flight hours in more than 35 different aircraft.

== Awards and honors ==
- Meritorious Service Medal
- Air Force Commendation Medals (two)
- Outstanding Unit Awards (two)
- Combat Readiness Medals (two)
- Distinguished Graduate in the class of 1986 at the U.S. Air Force Academy, with honors
- Distinguished Graduate of Undergraduate Pilot Training at Euro-NATO Joint Jet Pilot Training at Sheppard Air Force Base, Wichita Falls, Texas
- Top Gun at F-15 initial training at Luke Air Force Base, Phoenix, Arizona
- Distinguished Graduate and winner of the Liethen-Tittle Award for the Outstanding Graduate of the Air Force Test Pilot School, class 93B

=== NASA experience ===
Selected by NASA in April 1996, Kelly reported to the Johnson Space Center in August 1996. Having completed two years of training and evaluation, he is qualified for selection as a pilot on a Space Shuttle flight crew. He served as pilot on two shuttle missions. Initially, Kelly was assigned to the Astronaut Office Flight Support Branch where he served as a member of the Astronaut Support Personnel team responsible for shuttle launch preparation.

=== Space flight experience ===
- STS-102 Discovery (March 8, 2001 – March 21, 2001) was the eighth Space Shuttle mission to visit the International Space Station. The mission accomplishments included the delivery of the Expedition 2 crew and the contents of the Leonardo Multi-Purpose Logistics Module, the completion of two successful space walks, the return to Earth of the Expedition 1 crew, as well as the return of Leonardo, the reusable cargo carrier built by the Italian Space Agency. Mission duration was 307 hours and 49 minutes. Kelly was the pilot on this mission.
- STS-114 Discovery (July 26, 2005 – August 9, 2005) was NASA's Return to Flight mission after the Space Shuttle Columbia disaster. The mission saw Kelly return to the International Space Station. During the time docked there were three spacewalks made which aimed to test procedures for thermal protection system repair. The mission was extended by a day due to bad weather at the Kennedy Space Center.

When this continued for a second day the shuttle was diverted and Kelly landed with Discovery at Edwards Air Force Base, California. Mission duration was 333 hours, 33 minutes. Kelly was the pilot on this mission.
