= Middletown, Iowa =

- City
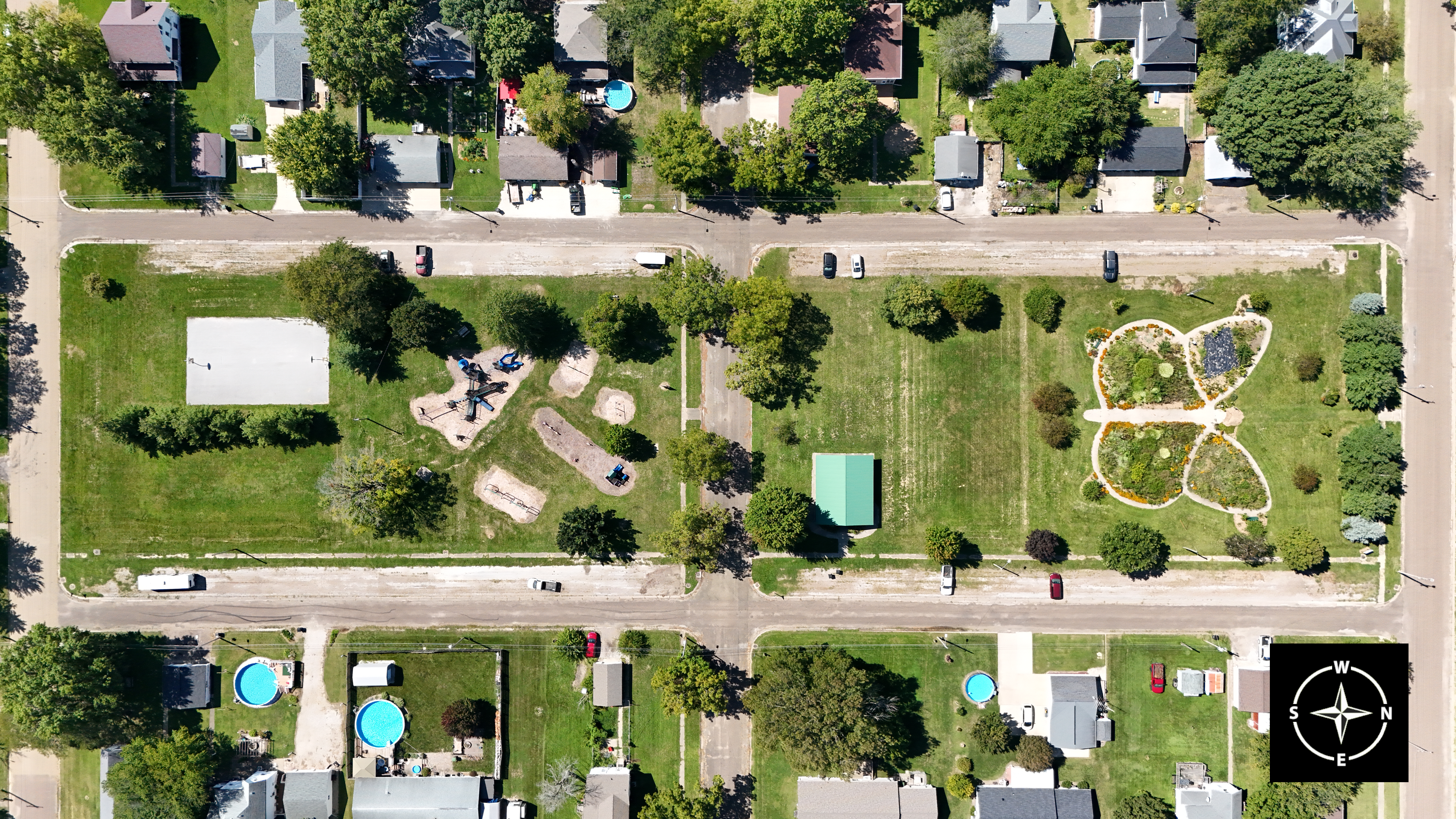
- A city park in Middletown

- Location of Middletown, Iowa
- Coordinates: 40°49′40″N 91°15′44″W
- Country: USA
- State: Iowa
- County: Des Moines

Area
  - Total: 0.55 sq mi (1.42 km^{2})
  - Land: 0.55 sq mi (1.42 km^{2})
  - Water: 0 sq mi (0.00 km^{2})
- Elevation: 725 ft (221 m)

Population (2020)
  - Total: 363
  - Density: 661.2/sq mi (255.31/km^{2})
- Time zone: UTC-6 (Central (CST))
  - Summer (DST): UTC-5 (CDT)
- ZIP code: 52638
- Area code: 319
- FIPS code: 19-51735
- GNIS feature ID: 2395316
- Website: middletowniowa.com

Middletown is a city in Des Moines County, Iowa, United States. The population was 363 at the time of the 2020 census. It is part of the Burlington, IA–IL Micropolitan Statistical Area.

== History ==
Middletown was laid out in 1846. In 1940, the Iowa Army Ammunition Plant was established just to the south of Middletown.

== Geography ==
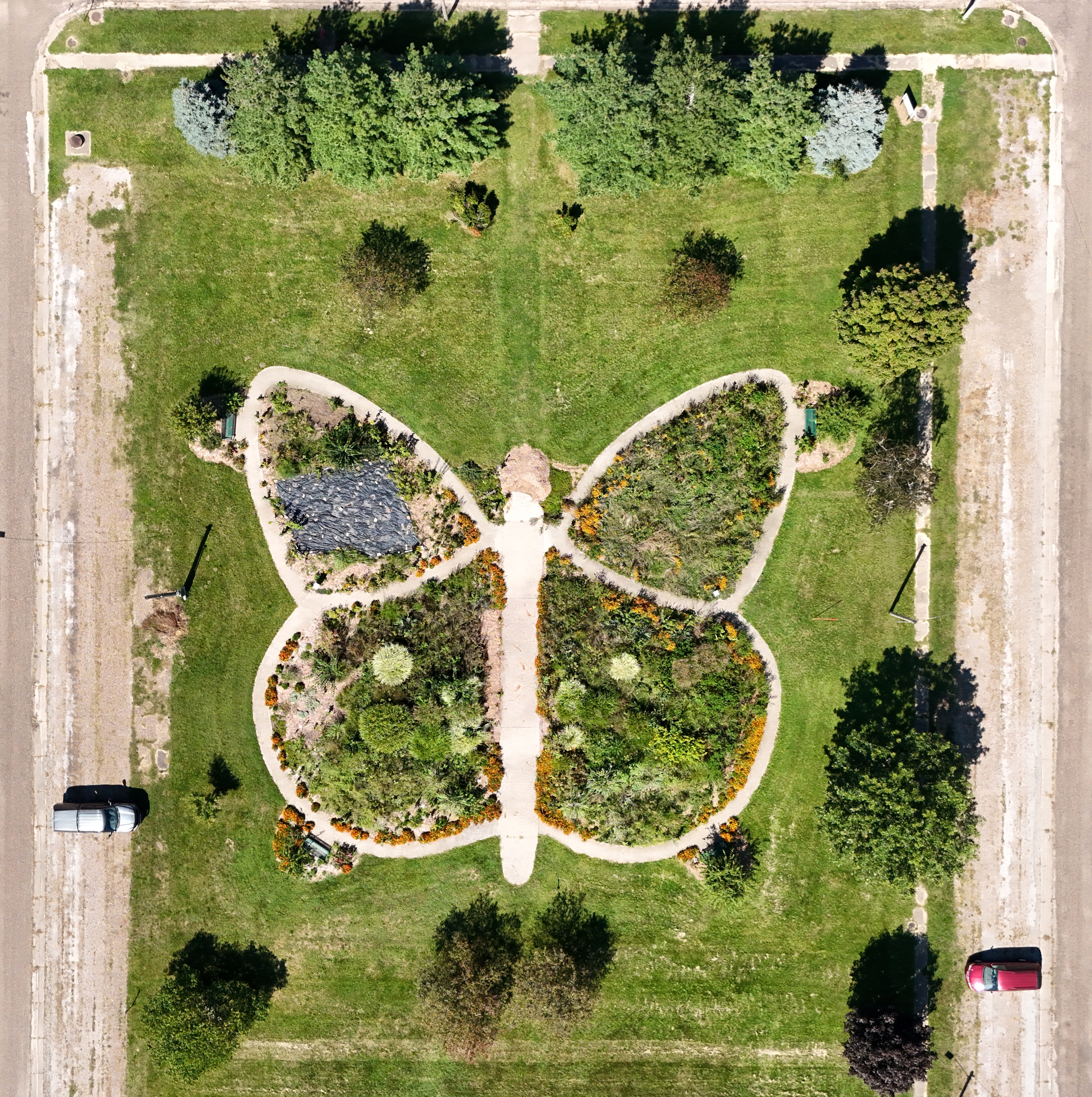
A butterfly sanctuary, planted with wildflowers, in Middletown

According to the United States Census Bureau, the city has a total area of 0.61 square miles (1.58 km^{2}), all land.

== Demographics ==
Historical populations
Year	Pop.	±%
1920	112	—
1930	126	+12.5%
1940	134	+6.3%
1950	229	+70.9%
1960	245	+7.0%
1970	443	+80.8%
1980	487	+9.9%
1990	386	−20.7%
2000	535	+38.6%
2010	318	−40.6%
2020	363	+14.2%
Source:"U.S. Census website". United States Census Bureau. and Iowa Data Center; Source: U.S. Decennial Census

=== 2020 census ===
As of the census of 2020, there were 363 people, 142 households, and 100 families residing in the city. The population density was 661.2 inhabitants per square mile (255.3/km^{2}). There were 153 housing units at an average density of 278.7 per square mile (107.6/km^{2}). The racial makeup of the city was 93.7% White, 0.8% Black or African American, 0.0% Native American, 0.6% Asian, 0.0% Pacific Islander, 0.3% from other races and 4.7% from two or more races. Hispanic or Latino persons of any race comprised 1.7% of the population.

Of the 142 households, 34.5% of which had children under the age of 18 living with them, 47.2% were married couples living together, 11.3% were cohabitating couples, 23.2% had a female householder with no spouse or partner present and 18.3% had a male householder with no spouse or partner present. 29.6% of all households were non-families. 23.9% of all households were made up of individuals, 7.0% had someone living alone who was 65 years old or older.

The median age in the city was 38.8 years. 26.2% of the residents were under the age of 20; 4.7% were between the ages of 20 and 24; 27.0% were from 25 and 44; 24.8% were from 45 and 64; and 17.4% were 65 years of age or older. The gender makeup of the city was 50.7% male and 49.3% female.

=== 2010 census ===
At the 2010 census there were 318 people in 127 households, including 94 families, in the city. The population density was 521.3 inhabitants per square mile (201.3/km^{2}). There were 148 housing units at an average density of 242.6 per square mile (93.7/km^{2}). The racial makeup of the city was 95.3% White, 1.6% African American, 1.6% Asian, 0.9% Pacific Islander, and 0.6% from two or more races. Hispanic or Latino of any race were 1.3%.

Of the 127 households 34.6% had children under the age of 18 living with them, 58.3% were married couples living together, 9.4% had a female householder with no husband present, 6.3% had a male householder with no wife present, and 26.0% were non-families. 22.8% of households were one person and 7.8% were one person aged 65 or older. The average household size was 2.50 and the average family size was 2.88.

The median age was 37.5 years. 27.4% of residents were under the age of 18; 5.6% were between the ages of 18 and 24; 26.6% were from 25 to 44; 27% were from 45 to 64; and 13.2% were 65 or older. The gender makeup of the city was 50.9% male and 49.1% female.

=== 2000 census ===
At the 2000 census there were 535 people in 191 households, including 141 families, in the city. The population density was 875.2 inhabitants per square mile (337.9/km^{2}). There were 223 housing units at an average density of 364.8 per square mile (140.9/km^{2}). The racial makup of the city was 93.27% White, 2.62% African American, 1.31% Asian, 1.50% from other races, and 1.31% from two or more races. Hispanic or Latino of any race were 2.43%.

Of the 191 households 41.4% had children under the age of 18 living with them, 48.7% were married couples living together, 18.3% had a female householder with no husband present, and 25.7% were non-families. 18.8% of households were one person and 4.7% were one person aged 65 or older. The average household size was 2.62 and the average family size was 2.92.

Age spread: 28.2% under the age of 18, 7.9% from 18 to 24, 31.4% from 25 to 44, 18.7% from 45 to 64, and 13.8% 65 or older. The median age was 36 years. For every 100 females, there were 94.5 males. For every 100 females age 18 and over, there were 89.2 males.

The median household income was $37,083 and the median family income was $37,500. Males had a median income of $37,000 versus $19,167 for females. The per capita income for the city was $16,835. About 15.4% of families and 19.5% of the population were below the poverty line, including 28.8% of those under age 18 and 16.0% of those age 65 or over.

== Education ==
Middletown is within the Burlington Community School District.
