= Burlington Community School District =

Public school district in Burlington, Iowa, United States

Coordinates: 40.799562°N 91.116569°W

Location
- Burlington, Iowa Des Moines County United States
- Coordinates: 40.799562, -91.116569

District information
- Type: Local school district
- Grades: K-12
- Established: 1849
- Superintendent: Nathan Marting
- Schools: 7
- Budget: $61,022,000 (2020-21)
- NCES District ID: 1905790

Students and staff
- Students: 3334 (2022-23)
- Teachers: 243.58 FTE
- Staff: 373.22 FTE
- Student–teacher ratio: 13.69
- Athletic conference: Southeast Conference

Other information
- Website: www.bcsds.org

Burlington Community School District (BCSD) is a public school district headquartered in Burlington, Iowa, United States. Entirely in Des Moines County, it serves Burlington and Middletown, as well as some residences in the western portion of West Burlington.

== History ==
School District No. 2 of the Township of Burlington was established on March 29, 1849, when 63% of voters at Congregational Church agreed to create it. The first school built with taxpayer money, with construction in the period 1851–1852, was North Hill School.

== Schools ==
As of July, 2020, the district operates seven schools:

- Burlington Community High School
- Aldo Leopold Intermediate School
- Edward Stone Middle School
- Black Hawk Elementary School
- Grimes Elementary School
- North Hill Elementary School
- Sunnyside Elementary School

=== Former schools ===
At one time the district had 15 elementary schools and three middle schools, but the board of education decided to enact a "Newer and Fewer" school consolidation program, in which new school buildings opened with each replacing multiple older schools.

Middle schools:

- James Madison Middle School - Jane Evans, the superintendent as of 2012, stated that the lack of total air conditioning and lower ceilings made it outdated.
- Horace Mann Middle School
- Oak Street Middle School

Elementary schools:

- Central Avenue Elementary School
- Corse Elementary School
- Perkins Elementary School
- Prospect Hill Elementary School
- Salter Elementary School
- Washington Elementary School

== See also ==
- List of school districts in Iowa
