= WACO Community School District =

Public school district in Wayland, Iowa, United States

Coordinates: 41.153353°N 91.660107°W

Address
- 611 N Pearl St. Wayland, Iowa, 52654; United States
- Coordinates: 41.153353, -91.660107

District information
- Type: Public
- Grades: K-12
- Established: 1962
- Superintendent: Spencer Lueders
- Schools: 2
- Budget: $8,059,000 (2020-21)
- NCES District ID: 1929490

Students and staff
- Students: 505 (2022-23)
- Teachers: 44.49 FTE
- Staff: 40.73 FTE
- Student–teacher ratio: 11.35
- Athletic conference: Southeast Iowa Superconference; North Division
- District mascot: Warriors
- Colors: Blue and White

Other information
- Affiliation(s): (Boys' sports) IHSAA and (Girls' Sports) IGHSAU
- Website: www.wacocsd.org

The WACO Community School District is a rural public school district headquartered in Wayland, Iowa. It spans Henry, Washington, and Louisa counties, and serves the towns of Wayland, Crawfordsville, and Olds, and the surrounding rural areas. It also includes the census-designated place of Swedesburg.

Spencer Lueders has been the superintendent since 2025.

== Schools ==
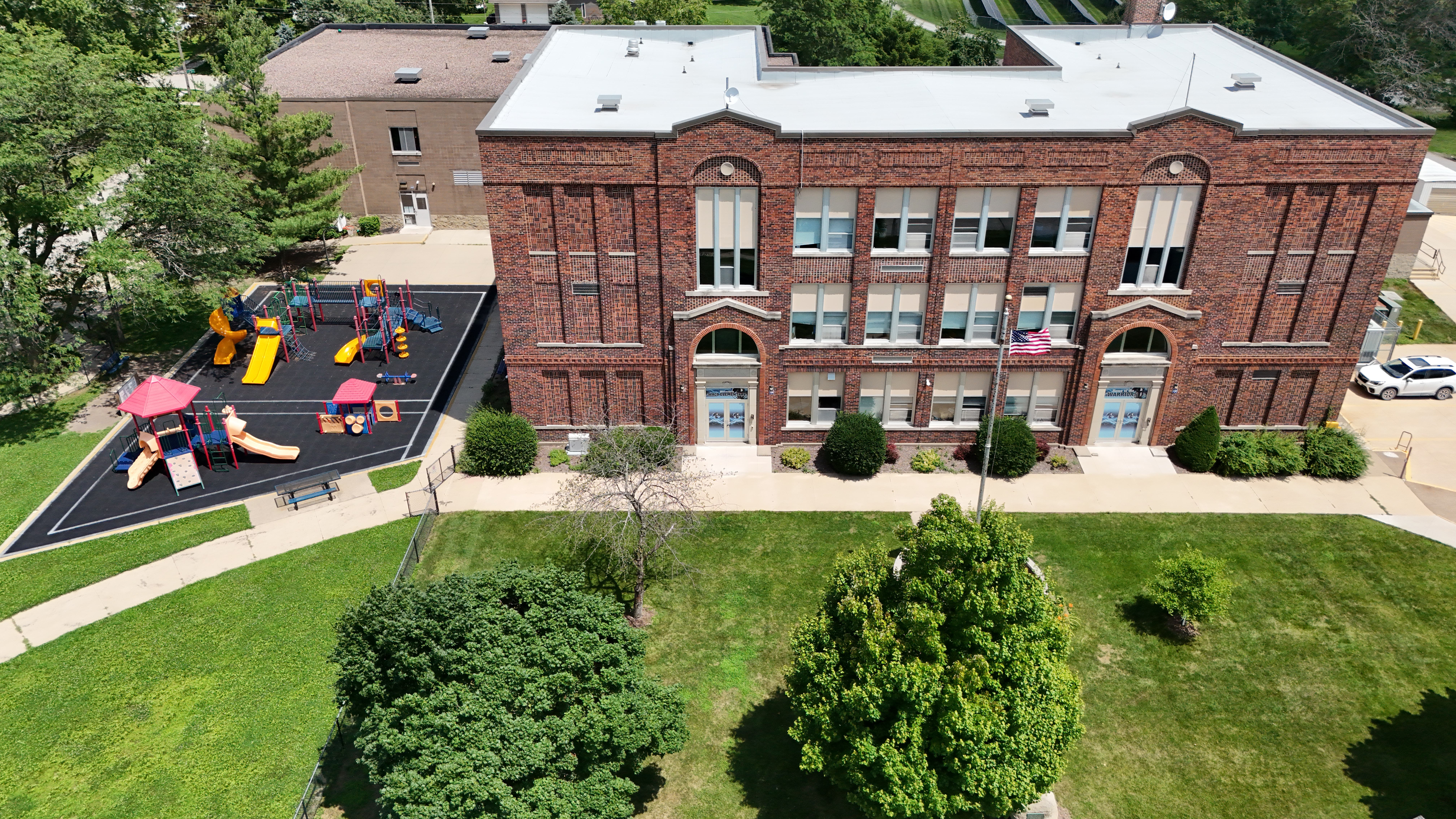
WACO Elementary School

The district operates two schools:

- WACO Elementary School, Crawfordsville
- WACO High School, Wayland

== Athletics ==
The Warriors compete in the Southeast Iowa Superconference (North Division), in the following sports:

- Boys' & Girls' Cross country
- Girls' Volleyball
- Boys' & Girls' Wrestling
- Boys' & Girls' Basketball
- Boys' & Girls' Track and field
- Boys' & Girls' Soccer
- Girls' Softball

The Warriors send their athletes to Washington to compete in the Southeast Conference, in the following sports:

- Boys' & Girls' Golf
- Boys' Baseball

For American Football, the Warriors compete in Iowa Class Eight-Player District 5 (As of 2025).

== See also ==
- List of school districts in Iowa
- List of high schools in Iowa
