= Jack Pence =

American football coach (1898–1986)

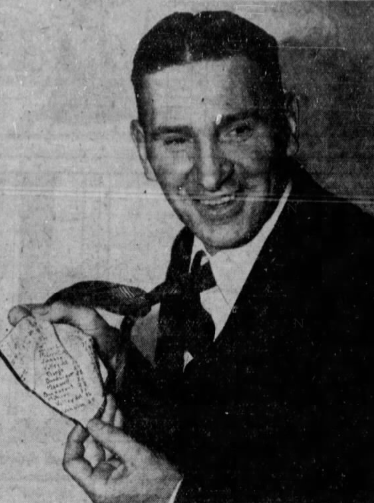
- Pence in 1937

Biographical details
- Born: November 10, 1898; Columbus Junction, Iowa, U.S.
- Died: January 5, 1986 (aged 87); Columbus Junction, Iowa, U.S.
- Education: Coe College (1924); Parsons College

Playing career

Football
- 1920–1923: Coe
- 1923: Louisa County All-Stars

Basketball
- 1920–1921: Coe

Baseball
- 1921–1923: Coe
- Positions: Quarterback, halfback, placekicker, punter (football); Guard (basketball); Left fielder (baseball)

Coaching career (HC unless noted)

Football
- 1924–1926: Central (IA)
- 1927: Cresco HS (IA)
- 1928–1933: Red Oak HS (IA)
- 1935: Delta HS (IA)
- 1936–1939: Mitchellville HS (IA)
- 1940–1941: Columbus Junction HS (IA)
- 1942: West Chester HS (IA)
- 1943–1944: Columbus Junction HS (IA)
- 1945: Anamosa HS (IA)
- 1946: Oskaloosa HS (IA) (sophomores)

Basketball
- 1924–1927: Central (IA)
- 1928–1934: Red Oak HS (IA)
- 1935–1936: Delta HS (IA)
- 1936–1939: Mitchellville HS (IA)
- 1939–1942: Columbus Junction HS (IA)
- 1943–1945: Columbus Junction HS (IA)
- 1945–1946: Anamosa HS (IA)

Baseball
- 1924: Coe (manager)

Administrative career (AD unless noted)
- 1924–1927: Central (IA)
- 1927–1928: Cresco HS (IA)
- 1936–1939: Mitchellville HS (IA)
- 1942–1943: West Chester HS (IA)
- 1945–1946: Anamosa HS (IA)

Head coaching record
- Overall: 7–10–3 (college football); 21–8 (college basketball)

Accomplishments and honors

Awards
- Coe Hall of Fame (1973)

John Wesley Pence (November 10, 1898 – January 5, 1986) was an American college and high school athletics coach.

== Early life and playing career ==
Pence was born on November 10, 1898, in Columbus Junction, Iowa to James and Nina Gaumer Pence. He attended Columbus Junction High School, where he graduated in 1920. He then enrolled at Coe College and played college football for the Kohawks football team. He initially starred as the team's placekicker and punter while substituted at quarterback, but midway through his freshman year he transitioned from quarterback to starting halfback. As a quarterback he was serviceable but was moved because he was "fast and has an educated toe." He had led the team to a 6–0 win over Iowa State by kicking both field goals for the game's only scores. During his second season, Pence injured his hip during a game against Dubuque which caused him to miss a few games.

During Pence's senior year, he gained attention as a kicker primarily. In a game against Drake he was credited with a 59-yard field goal, which was registered as the fourth-longest in the history of college football until that point. According to historian Parke H. Davis, no player up to that point had scored more than four 40-yard field goals in a single game. Pence had scored five during the game.

Immediately following the close of his college football career, Pence played semi-professionally for the Louisa County All-Stars.

Pence was also a member of the basketball and baseball teams as a guard and left fielder, respectively. He was deemed ineligible to play baseball his senior season so he opted to work as the team's manager.

== Coaching career ==
Upon graduating from Coe in June 1924, Pence was hired as the athletic director and head football and basketball coach for Central College, succeeding Karl Kettering. In his inaugural football season he led the team to a 2–4–1 record. In his second year, he became the first Coe alumni to return to Coe as an opposing football coach. His return to Coe was marked as "Pence Day" to celebrate his achievements as a football player for the school. In three seasons as head football coach he amassed an overall record of 7–10–3. As basketball coach he led the team to an overall record 21–8. He resigned in March 1927 after three years with the school.

In August 1927, Pence was hired as the athletic director and football coach for Cresco High School. He led the team to an undefeated 8–0 record in his first season, claiming the state title without having allowed a single point all season. He was with Cresco for one season before being hired as the head football and basketball coach for Red Oak High School. In his first football season, he led the team to its first win over rival Shenandoah High School since 1919 and finished the season undefeated, claiming the Little Ten Southwest Iowa Championship. He remained at Red Oak until April 1934.

Pence was out of coaching until July 1935, when he accepted the head football and basketball coach positions for Delta High School. In the summer prior, he attended summer classes as Parsons College. He was with the team for one year before accepting the positions of athletic director, head football coach, and basketball coach for Mitchellville High School. He was rehired and given a raise after his initial one-year contract expired. During his second year with the school the football and basketball teams both only lost one game with the basketball team winning 26-straight before losing in the state tournament.

In 1940, Pence returned to his alma mater, Columbus Junction, as the school's head football and basketball coach. He was hired as the principal, athletic director, and head football coach for West Chester High School in 1942. He returned to Columbus Junction the year later. In 1945, he accepted the positions of athletic director, football coach, and basketball coach for Anamosa High School. He resigned after only one season. He led basketball team to the Jones County basketball title and was ranked as one of the best teams in eastern Iowa. In 1946, he coached the sophomore football team for Oskaloosa High School.

== Personal life ==
Pence married Nellie Rouston of Fairfield, Iowa, in June 1925. The couple resided in Pella, Iowa. Pence and his wife owned and operated a convenience store in Columbus Junction, Iowa. Nellie died in 1955. Pence later remarried to Leah Hankins on December 29, 1967, in Fort Madison, Iowa.

Pence died on January 5, 1986, in Columbus Junction following a lengthy illness. He was buried in Libertyville, Iowa. He was survived by his wife, son, one of his daughters, his brother, five grandchildren, and 10 great-grandchildren.

== Head coaching record ==
=== College football ===
Year	Team	Overall	Conference	Standing	Bowl/playoffs
Central Dutch (Iowa Conference) (1924–1926)
1924	Central	2–4–1	1–2	8th	
1925	Central	2–3–1	1–2–1	10th	
1926	Central	3–3–1	2–2	8th	
Central:		7–10–3	4–6–1		
Total:		7–10–3			
