= Mediapolis Community School District =

Public school district in Mediapolis, Iowa, United States

Coordinates: 41.013614°N 91.160965°W

Address
- 725 N Northfield St. Mediapolis, Iowa, 52637; United States
- Coordinates: 41.013614, -91.160965

District information
- Type: Public
- Motto: "Motivated by Excellence Pride and Opportunity"
- Grades: K-12
- Established: 1909
- President: Toni Coates
- Vice-president: John Witte
- Superintendent: Adam Magliari
- Schools: 3
- Budget: $12,944,000 (2020-21)
- NCES District ID: 1918930

Students and staff
- Students: 968 (2022-23)
- Teachers: 64.41 FTE
- Staff: 71.45 FTE
- Student–teacher ratio: 15.03
- Athletic conference: Southeast Iowa Superconference; South Division
- District mascot: Bulldogs and Bullettes
- Colors: Orange and Black

Other information
- Affiliation(s): (Boys' sports) IHSAA and (Girls' Sports) IGHSAU
- Website: www.meposchools.org

The Mediapolis Community School District, or Mediapolis Schools, is a rural public school district headquartered in Mediapolis, Iowa. It is mostly within Des Moines County, with a small area in Louisa County, and serves the city of Mediapolis and the surrounding rural areas.

Greg Ray has been the superintendent since 2009. Incumbent Superintendent Adam Magliari will start in June 2023.

== Schools ==
The district operates three schools, all in single facility in Mediapolis classified as Mediapolis CSD:

- Mediapolis Elementary School
- Mediapolis Middle School
- Mediapolis High School

== Athletics ==
The Bulldogs/Bullettes compete in the Southeast Iowa Superconference (South Division), in the following sports:

- Boys' & Girls' Cross country
- Girls' Volleyball
- Boys' & Girls' Wrestling
- Boys' & Girls' Basketball
- Boys' & Girls' Bowling
- Boys' & Girls' Track and field
- Boys' & Girls' Golf
- Boys' & Girls' Soccer
- Boys' Baseball
- Girls' Softball

The Bulldogs/Bullettes send their athletes to Burlington to compete in the Southeast Conference in the following sport(s):

- Boys' & Girls' Swimming

For American Football, the Bulldogs compete in Iowa Class 2A District 6 (As of 2025).

== See also ==
- List of school districts in Iowa
- List of high schools in Iowa
