= New London Community School District =

Public school district in New London, Iowa, United States

Coordinates: 40.924357°N 91.40189°W

Address
- 101 Jack Wilson Dr. New London, Iowa, 52645; United States
- Coordinates: 40.924357, -91.40189

District information
- Type: Public
- Motto: "We Guide. We Challenge. We Motivate. We Learn."
- Grades: K-12
- Established: 1844
- Superintendent: Jamie Cranston
- Schools: 2
- Budget: $8,233,000 (2020-21)
- NCES District ID: 1920460

Students and staff
- Students: 592 (2022-23)
- Teachers: 46.43 FTE
- Staff: 39.65 FTE
- Student–teacher ratio: 12.75
- Athletic conference: Southeast Iowa Superconference; South Division
- District mascot: Tigers
- Colors: Black and Gold

Other information
- Affiliation(s): (Boys' sports) IHSAA and (Girls' Sports) IGHSAU
- Website: www.nlcsd.org

The New London Community School District, or New London Schools, is a rural public school district headquartered in New London, Iowa. It is mainly in Henry County, with a smaller area in Des Moines County, and serves the city of New London and the surrounding rural areas.

== Schools ==
The district operates two schools, both in New London:

- Clark Elementary School
- New London Jr-Sr High School

== Athletics ==
The Tigers compete in the Southeast Iowa Superconference (South Division), in the following sports:

- Boys' & Girls' Cross country
- Girls' Volleyball
- Boys' & Girls' Wrestling
- Boys' & Girls' Basketball
- Boys' & Girls' Track and field
- Boys' & Girls' Golf
- Boys' Soccer (Co-op With Danville)
- Girls' Soccer (Co-op with Notre Dame)
- Boys' Baseball
- Girls' Softball (Co-op with North Division School Winfield Mt. Union)

For American Football, the Tigers compete in Iowa Class A District 5 (As of 2025).

The Tigers send their athletes to Mount Pleasant to compete in the Southeast Conference in the following sports:

- Boys' & Girls' Bowling

== See also ==
- List of school districts in Iowa
- List of high schools in Iowa
