= Southeast Iowa Superconference =

18-team athletics and activities conference based in Southeastern Iowa

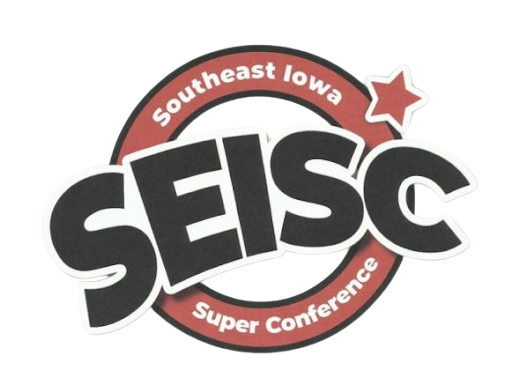
- First season: 1991
- Sports fielded: 21; men's: 11; women's: 10
- Divisions: North (9) & South (8)
- No. of teams: 17
- Region: Southeastern Iowa
- Affiliation(s): IHSAA (Boys' sports) and IGHSAU (Girls' sports)
- Website: www.seisconference.org

The Southeast Iowa Superconference, also known as the SEISC, is a 17-team athletics and activities conference based in Southeastern Iowa. The conference was created in 1991 from the merger of the Deerwood Conference and the Southeast Iowa Conference. It is made up of 1A, 2A and 3A high schools.

== History ==
The conference formed from the 20 schools in the Deerwood Conference (Danville, Harmony, New London, Notre Dame, Burlington, Van Buren, WACO, West Burlington, and Winfield-Mt. Union), the Southeast Iowa Conference (Cardinal, Central Lee, Columbus Community, Highland, Lone Tree, Louisa–Muscatine, Mediapolis, Pekin, and Wapello), plus Aquinas, Cardinal Stritch, and Marquette Catholic to provide an upgrade in football schedules, and to provide competition for non-athletic events such as speech, music, and art.

Since the conference's founding, there have been many changes. For one, the Iowa High School Athletic Association took complete control of the football scheduling by implementing the current district format. Also, many of the schools have since stopped participating in the fine arts portion of the conference. Since the conference's founding, three schools have closed (Ft. Madison Aquinas, Marquette of West Point in 2005, and Cardinal Stritch in Keokuk in 2006.) The conference added Maharishi and Iowa Mennonite in 1996–97. Ft. Madison Holy Trinity joined the league in 2005 as Aquinas's successor. Harmony High School consolidated with Van Buren County schools in 2016.

For the 2019–20 school year, the Iowa Mennonite School changed their name to Hillcrest Academy, and adopted "Ravens" as their mascot.

At the start of the 2022–2023 school year, the Cardinal Comets departed the SEISC for the South Central Conference.

On June 23, 2026, Central Lee voted to request membership to the Southeast Conference.

== Members ==
=== North Division ===
Institution	Location	Mascot	Colors	Affiliation	2026-2027 BEDS	Football District
Columbus Community	Columbus Junction	Wildcats		Public	154	A District 5
Highland	Riverside	Huskies		Public	101	A District 5
Hillcrest Academy	Kalona	Ravens		Private	76	3A District 5
Lone Tree	Lone Tree	Lions/Lady Lions		Public	69	A District 5
Louisa-Muscatine	Letts	Falcons		Public	175	1A District 6
Pekin	Packwood	Panthers/Lady Panthers		Public	127	A District 5
WACO	Wayland	Warriors		Public	133	8 Player District 5
Wapello	Wapello	Indians/Arrows		Public	121	A District 5
Winfield-Mt. Union	Winfield	Wolves		Public	93	8 Player District 5

=== South Division ===
Institution	Location	Mascot	Colors	Affiliation	2026-2027 BEDS	Football District
Central Lee	Donnellson	Hawks/Lady Hawks		Public	267	2A District 6
Danville	Danville	Bears/Lady Bears		Public	140	A District 5
Holy Trinity Catholic	Fort Madison	Crusaders		Private	64	2A District 6
Mediapolis (Mepo)	Mediapolis	Bulldogs/Bullettes		Public	218	2A District 6
New London	New London	Tigers		Public	125	A District 5
Notre Dame Catholic	Burlington	Nikes		Private	101	2A District 6
Van Buren County	Keosauqua	Warriors		Public	175	A District 5
West Burlington	West Burlington	Falcons		Public	196	2A District 6
