= Harmony Community School District =

Defunct school district in Iowa

District information
- Type: Public
- Grades: PreK-12
- Established: 1959
- Closed: 2014

Students and staff
- Athletic conference: Southeast Iowa Superconference; South Division
- District mascot: Rockets
- Colors: Red & White

Other information
- Affiliations: (Boys' sports) IHSAA and (Girls' Sports) IGHSAU

Harmony Community School District was a school district which was, at the end of its existence, headquartered in unincorporated Van Buren County, Iowa, near Farmington. It served sections of Van Buren, Henry, and Lee counties. Communities in its service area included Farmington, Bonaparte, and Hillsboro.

In previous eras it had its headquarters in Bonaparte. In 2016 the high school closed and the elementary moved into the former high school building. At the end of its existence the district operated one school, Harmony Elementary School near Farmington, and sent students to Van Buren Junior-Senior High School in Keosauqua as part of a grade-sharing arrangement.

== History ==
The state of Iowa had changed its scheme for funding public schools, and the numbers of students in area schools had decreased. In January 2016 the Harmony district and the Van Buren Community School District agreed to begin a grade-sharing arrangement in which Harmony-zoned students attended Van Buren schools for grades 7–12. The Harmony district repurposed the Farmington high school building for its elementary schools. The arrangement began in fall 2016. The Harmony district's junior and senior high school closed the previous spring. The final graduating class consisted of 15 students.

In January 2018 the administrations of the Van Buren and Harmony districts began to consider merging. In February 2018 83% of the voters in the Van Buren and Harmony districts voted to merge, with 94% (of 637 voters) in favor in the pre-merger Van Buren district and 72% (of 619 voters) in favor in the pre-merger Harmony district. The requirement for a merge was for both districts to each have over 50% of voters in favor.

There was a single superintendent and school board for both areas beginning on July 1, 2019. On that day the Van Buren County Community School District was formed.

== Schools ==
It formerly operated Harmony Elementary in Bonaparte, Harmony Middle School in Farmington, and Harmony High School in unincorporated Van Buren County.
