= Highland Community School District =

Public school district in Riverside, Iowa, United States

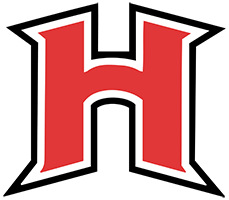

Address
- 1715 Vine Ave. Riverside Iowa, 52327; United States

District information
- Type: Public
- Motto: "Home of the Huskies"
- Grades: PreK-12
- Established: 1963
- Superintendent: Spencer Lueders
- Schools: 3
- Budget: $10,497,000 (2020-21)
- NCES District ID: 1914010

Students and staff
- Students: 565 (2022-23)
- Teachers: 43.70 (on an FTE basis)
- Staff: 42.26 (on an FTE basis)
- Student–teacher ratio: 12.93
- Athletic conference: Southeast Iowa Superconference; North Division
- District mascot: Huskies
- Colors: Red, Black, and White

Other information
- Cities served: Riverside and Ainsworth, Iowa
- Mission Statement: "Provide all students the opportunity to acquire the necessary skills to fulfill their potential and become positive contributors to society."
- Affiliation(s): (Boys' sports) IHSAA and (Girls' Sports) IGHSAU
- Rivalries: The battle for 22 with Lone Tree
- Website: http://www.highlandhuskies.org

The Highland Community School District is a rural public school district headquartered in unincorporated Washington County, Iowa, that serves much of eastern Washington County and a small portion of southern Johnson County, including Riverside, Ainsworth, and surrounding rural areas.

The high school and middle school are connected in one building, also housing the district headquarters, located between Riverside and Ainsworth in an unincorporated area in Washington County. The elementary school is located in Riverside.

== History ==
The district was formed in 1963 as the consolidation of Riverside and Ainsworth schools.

== Schools ==
=== Highland Elementary School ===
Located in Riverside, Highland Elementary is the district's sole elementary school, housing grades Kindergarten through fifth. The school also provides a preschool program for children ages four and five. Formerly known as Riverside Elementary, the school was renamed Highland Elementary in 2017 when Ainsworth Elementary closed and all elementary-aged students in the district consolidated into one school.

=== Highland Middle School ===
Highland Middle School is the single middle school in the district. The school opened in the fall of 2003, with one addition and remodeling project since. It is connected to Highland High School. It is located in the rural area between Riverside and Ainsworth at 1715 Vine Avenue. The school serves grades 6 through 8.

=== Highland High School ===
The sole high school in the district, serves grades 9 through 12. The building was built in 1965, with renovations and additions since then. A connection to the middle school allows the sharing of some courses between schools. It is currently a 1A school in athletics and extracurricular activities.

== Athletics ==
The Huskies compete in the Southeast Iowa Superconference (North Division), in the following sports:

- Boys' & Girls' Cross country
- Girls' Volleyball
- Boys' & Girls' Wrestling (Co-op with Lone Tree)
- Boys' & Girls' Basketball
- Boys' & Girls' Track and field
- Boys' & Girls' Golf
- Boys' & Girls' Soccer
- Boys' Baseball
- Girls' Softball

The Huskies send their athletes to Iowa City West to compete in the Mississippi Valley Conference, in the following sports:

- Boys' & Girls' Bowling

For American Football (Co-op with Lone Tree), there is no mascot yet for the Football team, they compete in Iowa Class A District 5 (As of 2025).

== Former schools ==
From 1963 to 2017, the district operated two elementary schools. One school was located in Ainsworth with the other located in Riverside.

The most recent Ainsworth Elementary building was constructed in 1973 and received renovations and an expansion in 1999. Circa 2001 it had about 120 students. Due to declining enrollment and increased costs, the Highland Board of Education made the decision to close the Ainsworth school at the conclusion of the 2016-2017 school year. Starting the fall of 2017, all elementary students in the district began to attend school in Riverside, which was renamed Highland Elementary. In 2017 Ainsworth Elementary had 70 students. District leadership stated that it would have had to spend upkeep of $50,000 if it remained open.

Prior to the opening of the middle school in 2003, seventh through twelfth grade students in the district attended the Highland Junior-Senior High School, which was located at the current-day high school site. Sixth grade students attended either Ainsworth or Riverside Elementary School.

== See also ==
- List of school districts in Iowa
- List of high schools in Iowa
