= Winfield-Mt. Union Community School District =

Public school district in Winfield, Iowa, United States

Coordinates: 41.126543°N 91.44°W

Address
- 208 S Olive St. Winfield, Iowa, 52659; United States
- Coordinates: 41.126543, -91.44

District information
- Type: Public
- Grades: K-12
- Superintendent: Karinda Wahls
- Schools: 2
- Budget: $5,540,000 (2020-21)
- NCES District ID: 1931830

Students and staff
- Students: 391 (2022-23)
- Teachers: 29.52 FTE
- Staff: 37.50 FTE
- Student–teacher ratio: 13.25
- Athletic conference: Southeast Iowa Superconference; North Division
- District mascot: Wolves
- Colors: Red and White

Other information
- Affiliation(s): (Boys' sports) IHSAA and (Girls' Sports) IGHSAU
- Website: wmucsd.org

The Winfield-Mt. Union Community School District, or WMU, is a public school district headquartered in Winfield, Iowa. It spans Henry, Louisa, Des Moines and Washington counties, and serves the city of Winfield, the census-designated place of Mount Union, and the surrounding rural areas.

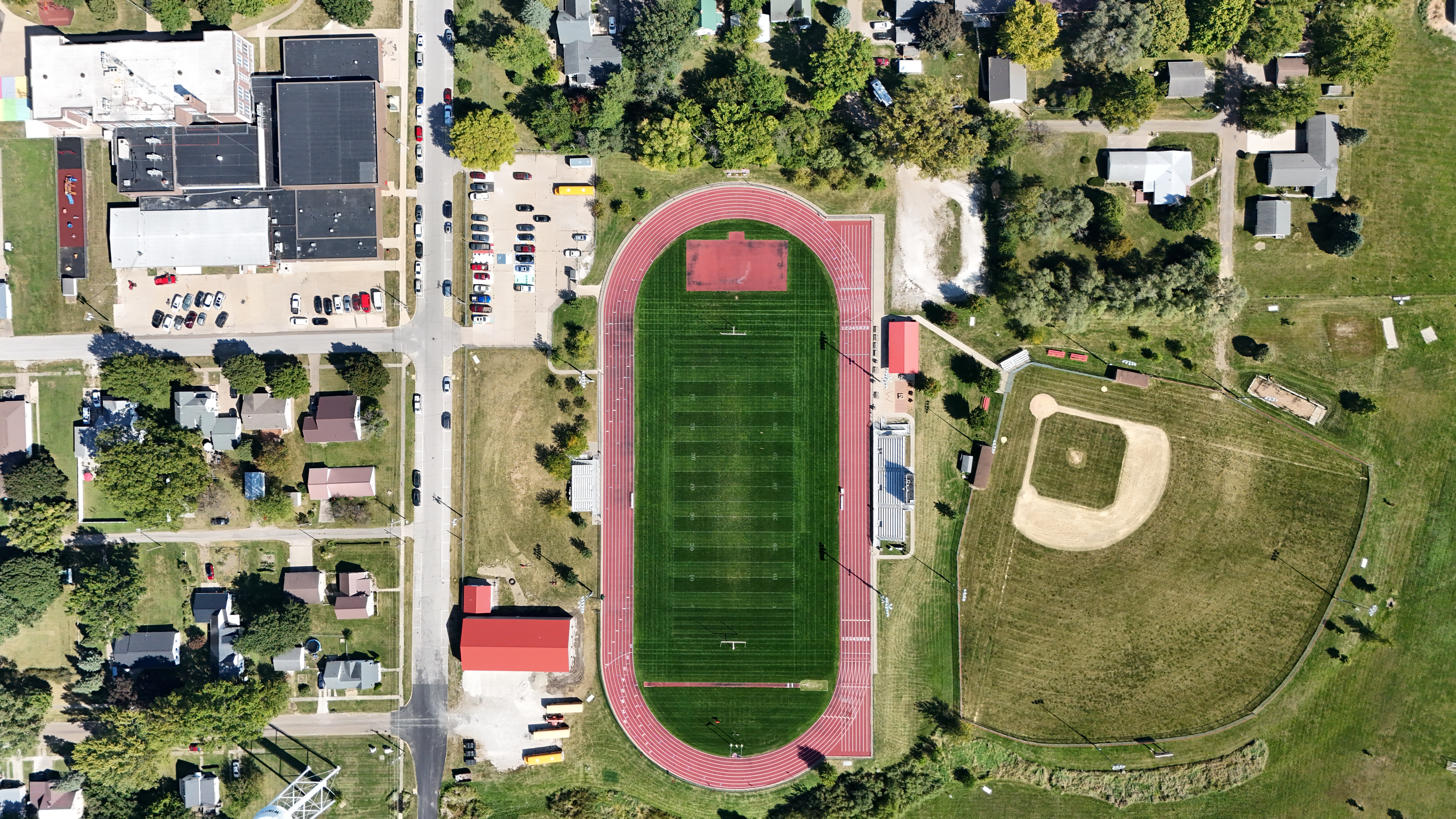
Winfield - Mt. Union highschool (upper left) and associated athletic fields

== Schools ==
The district operates two schools, both in Winfield:

- Winfield-Mt. Union Elementary School
- Winfield-Mt. Union Jr-Sr High School

== Athletics ==
The Wolves compete in the Southeast Iowa Superconference (North Division), in the following sports:

- Boys' & Girls' Cross country
- Girls' Volleyball
- Boys' & Girls' Wrestling (Co-op With Columbus Community)
- Boys' & Girls' Basketball
- Boys' & Girls' Track and field
- Boys' & Girls' Golf
- Bos' & Girls' Soccer (Co-op with Columbus Community)
- Boys' Baseball (Co-op With Columbus Community)
- Girls' Softball (Co-op With South Division School New London)

For American Football, the Wolves compete in Iowa Class Eight-Player District 5 (As of 2025).

== See also ==
- List of school districts in Iowa
- List of high schools in Iowa
