= Wayland, Iowa =

- City
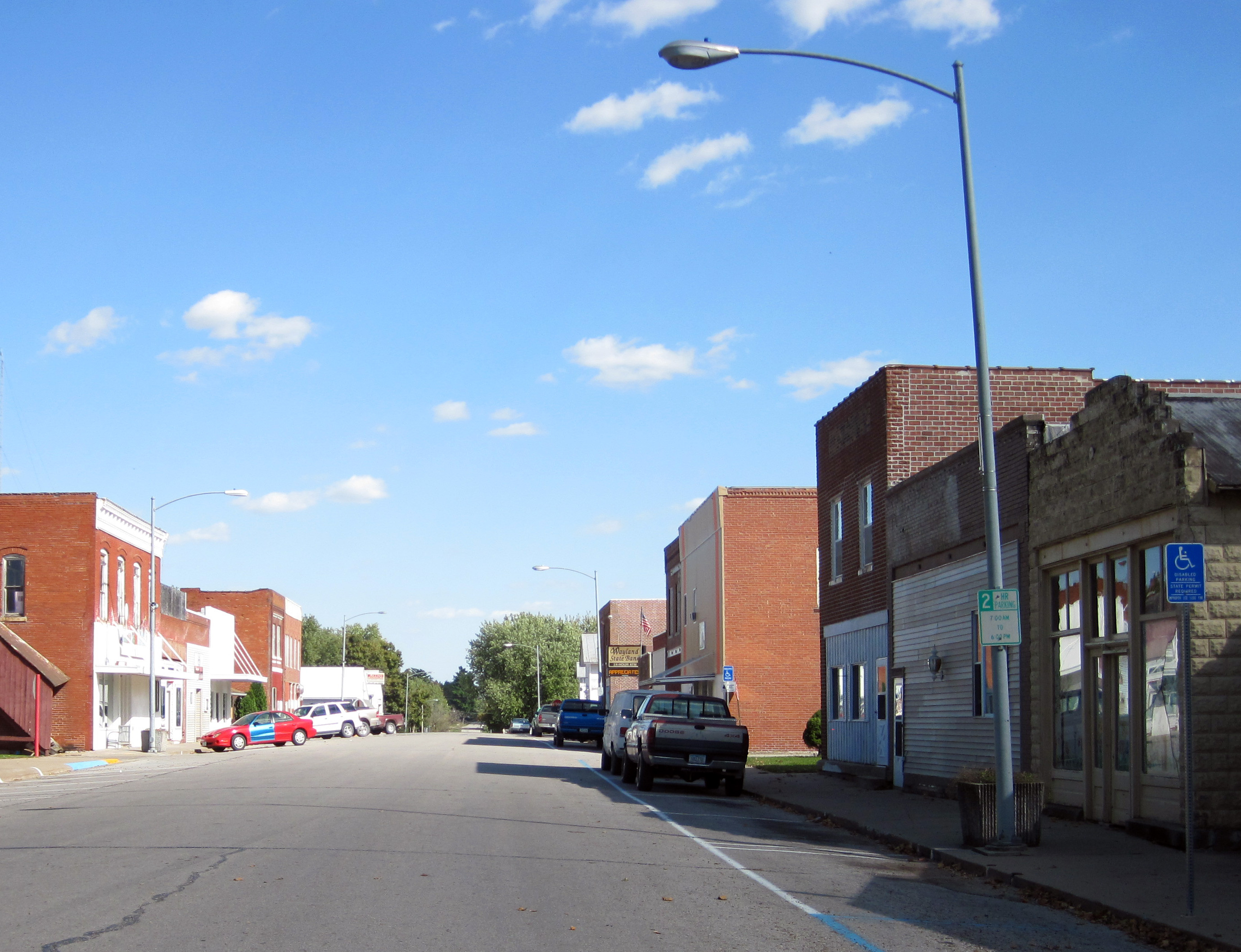
- Downtown Wayland

- Location of Wayland, Iowa
- Coordinates: 41°08′54″N 91°39′27″W
- Country: United States
- State: Iowa
- County: Henry

Area
  - Total: 1.07 sq mi (2.76 km^{2})
  - Land: 1.07 sq mi (2.76 km^{2})
  - Water: 0 sq mi (0.00 km^{2})
- Elevation: 712 ft (217 m)

Population (2020)
  - Total: 964
  - Density: 906/sq mi (349.9/km^{2})
- Time zone: UTC-6 (Central (CST))
  - Summer (DST): UTC-5 (CDT)
- ZIP code: 52654
- Area code: 319
- FIPS code: 19-82965
- GNIS feature ID: 2397231
- Website: www.waylandiowa.com

Wayland is a city in Jefferson Township, Henry County, Iowa, United States. The population was 964 at the time of the 2020 census.

== History ==
Wayland was originally known as Crooked Creek. Crooked Creek became a voting precinct on October 5, 1840. The first burial is given to John Bullock, in 1838. He came as a surveyor to this region in 1837. The need to establish a post office followed. Rufus M. Pickell, one of the local leaders, was appointed on February 3, 1843, postmaster for the land east of the Skunk River and south of Crooked Creek. Pickell was also a blacksmith by trade. Establishing a church followed, so the little log cabin Methodist Church was built in 1844. From 1851 to 1880, the town was known as Marshall. Christian Roth Sr. erected a brewery on his homestead in 1856, which was completed at a cost of over $4,000. Until its closing by laws passed in 1884, it had done a prosperous business and had a capacity of 10 barrels a day. Confusion over the name Marshall, Henry County and Marshalltown, Iowa, especially with mail getting mixed, required a change in 1879, with the smaller town relinquishing its name and taking up a new one in 1880. In the 1879 Henry County History book the following names can be found in Jefferson Township: Burrows, Clifton, Cook, Davies, Everts, Farmer, Hull, Jessup, Johnson, Manning, Mathews, Moore, Noble, Ressel, Sayles, Shively, Turney, Walker, Wallbank, Wiggins, and Williams.

== Geography ==
According to the United States Census Bureau, the village has a total area of 1.01 square miles (2.62 km^{2}), all land.

== Demographics ==
Historical populations
| Year | Pop. | ±% |
|---|---|---|
| 1880 | 171 | — |
| 1900 | 394 | +130.4% |
| 1910 | 550 | +39.6% |
| 1920 | 637 | +15.8% |
| 1930 | 625 | −1.9% |
| 1940 | 576 | −7.8% |
| 1950 | 600 | +4.2% |
| 1960 | 597 | −0.5% |
| 1970 | 702 | +17.6% |
| 1980 | 720 | +2.6% |
| 1990 | 838 | +16.4% |
| 2000 | 945 | +12.8% |
| 2010 | 966 | +2.2% |
| 2020 | 964 | −0.2% |
Source:"U.S. Census website". United States Census Bureau. and Iowa Data Center; Source: U.S. Decennial Census

=== 2020 census ===
As of the census of 2020, there were 964 people, 403 households, and 261 families residing in the city. The population density was 906.2 inhabitants per square mile (349.9/km^{2}). There were 423 housing units at an average density of 397.7 per square mile (153.5/km^{2}). The racial makeup of the city was 92.8% White, 0.0% Black or African American, 0.1% Native American, 0.6% Asian, 0.0% Pacific Islander, 1.6% from other races and 4.9% from two or more races. Hispanic or Latino persons of any race comprised 3.1% of the population.

Of the 403 households, 27.8% of which had children under the age of 18 living with them, 50.6% were married couples living together, 6.0% were cohabitating couples, 29.3% had a female householder with no spouse or partner present and 14.1% had a male householder with no spouse or partner present. 35.2% of all households were non-families. 31.0% of all households were made up of individuals, 17.4% had someone living alone who was 65 years old or older.

The median age in the city was 45.9 years. 25.4% of the residents were under the age of 20; 3.5% were between the ages of 20 and 24; 20.0% were from 25 and 44; 24.4% were from 45 and 64; and 26.7% were 65 years of age or older. The gender makeup of the city was 47.5% male and 52.5% female.

=== 2010 census ===
As of the census of 2010, there were 966 people, 396 households, and 268 families residing in the village. The population density was 956.4 inhabitants per square mile (369.3/km^{2}). There were 417 housing units at an average density of 412.9 per square mile (159.4/km^{2}). The racial makeup of the village was 95.5% White, 1.1% African American, 0.6% Native American, 0.9% Asian, 0.8% from other races, and 0.9% from two or more races. Hispanic or Latino of any race were 1.0% of the population.

There were 396 households, of which 26.0% had children under the age of 18 living with them, 54.0% were married couples living together, 8.3% had a female householder with no husband present, 5.3% had a male householder with no wife present, and 32.3% were non-families. 29.0% of all households were made up of individuals, and 19.7% had someone living alone who was 65 years of age or older. The average household size was 2.33 and the average family size was 2.85.

The median age in the village was 47.1 years. 21.7% of residents were under the age of 18; 5.7% were between the ages of 18 and 24; 19.3% were from 25 to 44; 26.6% were from 45 to 64; and 26.7% were 65 years of age or older. The gender makeup of the village was 47.9% male and 52.1% female.

=== 2000 census ===
As of the census of 2000, there were 945 people, 373 households, and 264 families residing in the city. The population density was 1,097.0 inhabitants per square mile (423.6/km^{2}). There were 386 housing units at an average density of 448.1 per square mile (173.0/km^{2}). The racial makeup of the city was 98.31% White, 0.74% Native American, 0.74% Asian, 0.11% from other races, and 0.11% from two or more races. Hispanic or Latino of any race were 0.11% of the population.

There were 373 households, out of which 29.8% had children under the age of 18 living with them, 60.1% were married couples living together, 8.6% had a female householder with no husband present, and 29.0% were non-families. 25.5% of all households were made up of individuals, and 17.4% had someone living alone who was 65 years of age or older. The average household size was 2.41 and the average family size was 2.88.

In the city, the population was spread out, with 23.9% under the age of 18, 7.1% from 18 to 24, 23.3% from 25 to 44, 19.5% from 45 to 64, and 26.2% who were 65 years of age or older. The median age was 42 years. For every 100 females, there were 81.7 males. For every 100 females age 18 and over, there were 74.5 males.

The median income for a household in the city was $35,667, and the median income for a family was $40,909. Males had a median income of $30,081 versus $19,688 for females. The per capita income for the city was $15,717. About 4.3% of families and 5.7% of the population were below the poverty line, including 8.1% of those under age 18 and 6.0% of those age 65 or over.

== Education ==
WACO Community School District operates local public schools.

=== WACO High School ===
Originally started in 1962 in Olds, the high school moved to Wayland in 1989. WACO is a consolidation and acronym of the communities Wayland, Ainsworth, Crawfordsville and Olds. The Ainsworth community is no longer a part of the WACO school district. WACO's mascot is the Warrior (Spartan/Trojan) and their colors are powder blue and white. The elementary school is located in Crawfordsville. Prior to WACO, the Wayland High School stood where the current Bomber Field is located, behind the city's fire department. Their mascot was originally the Dutchman and their colors were orange and navy blue. In the late 1940s, their mascot was the Bombers (B-25) and the school changed their colors to purple and white. They fielded their first football team in 1953.
