= Lone Tree Community School District =

Public school district in Lone Tree, Iowa, United States

Coordinates: 41.4851°N 91.4274°W

Address
- 303 Devoe St. Lone Tree Iowa, 52755; United States

District information
- Type: Public
- Motto: "Leave your mark."
- Grades: Pre-K-12
- Established: 1872
- Superintendent: Tyler Hotz
- Schools: 2
- Budget: $6,820,000 (2020-21)
- NCES District ID: 1917550

Students and staff
- Students: 428 (2022-23)
- Teachers: 34.98 FTE
- Staff: 34.28 FTE
- Student–teacher ratio: 12.24
- Athletic conference: Southeast Iowa Superconference; North Division
- District mascot: Lions (Boys) and Lady Lions (Girls)
- Colors: Black & Gold

Other information
- Affiliation(s): (Boys' sports) IHSAA and (Girls' Sports) IGHSAU
- Rivalries: The battle for 22 with Highland and The Black & Gold Brawl with L-M
- Website: http://www.lone-tree.k12.ia.us

The Lone Tree Community School District, or Lone Tree Schools, is a rural public school district headquartered in Lone Tree, Iowa.

The Elementary, Middle, and High School are all located in one building on Main Street in Lone Tree. The district is mostly in Johnson County, with a small area in Louisa County, and serves Lone Tree and the surrounding rural areas.

== Schools ==
The district operates two schools in a single facility in Lone Tree:

- Lone Tree Elementary School
- Lone Tree Junior-Senior High School

== Athletics ==
The Lions/Lady Lions compete in the Southeast Iowa Superconference (North Division), in the following sports:

- Boys' & Girls' Cross country
- Girls' Volleyball
- Boys' & Girls' Wrestling (Co-op with Highland)
- Boys' & Girls' Basketball
- Girls' Track and field
- Boys' Track and field (Co-op with Columbus Community)
- Boys' & Girls' Golf
- Boys' Baseball
- Girls' Softball

The Lions send their athletes to West Liberty to compete in the River Valley Conference (South Division) to compete in the following sport(s):

- Boys' & Girls' Soccer

For American Football (Co-op with Highland), there is no mascot yet for the Football team, they compete in class A District 5 (As of 2026).

== See also ==
- List of school districts in Iowa
- List of high schools in Iowa
