= Keokuk Community School District =

Public school district in Keokuk, Iowa, United States

Location
- Keokuk, Iowa Lee County United States
- Coordinates: 40.411°N 91.39031°W

District information
- Type: Local school district
- Grades: K-12
- Superintendent: Christine Barnes
- Schools: 5
- Budget: $27,776,000 (2020-21)
- NCES District ID: 1915630

Students and staff
- Students: 1790 (2022-23)
- Teachers: 126.76 FTE
- Staff: 166.82 FTE
- Student–teacher ratio: 14.12
- Athletic conference: Southeast Conference
- District mascot: Chiefs
- Colors: Purple and White

Other information
- Website: www.keokukschools.org/district/

Keokuk Community School District (KCSD) is a public school district headquartered in Keokuk, Iowa. It is entirely in Lee County, and serves Keokuk and the rural areas to the north and west of Keokuk. The district borders the states of Illinois to the east and Missouri to the south.

As of 2018 it had about 1,860 students, making it the 43rd largest school district in Iowa.

== Schools ==
- Keokuk High School
- Keokuk Middle School
  - A fire damaged the building in 2001.
- George Washington Elementary School
- Hawthorne Elementary School
- Torrence Preschool

Former schools:

- Lincoln Elementary School - Keokuk Waterworks now owns this building
- Torrence Elementary School - Now Torrence Preschool, and previously extra administrative offices
- Wells-Carey Elementary School - Built in 1925, and scheduled to close in 2012 due to reduced numbers of students.

== See also ==
- List of school districts in Iowa
