= Central Lee High School =

Public secondary school in Donnellson, Iowa, United States

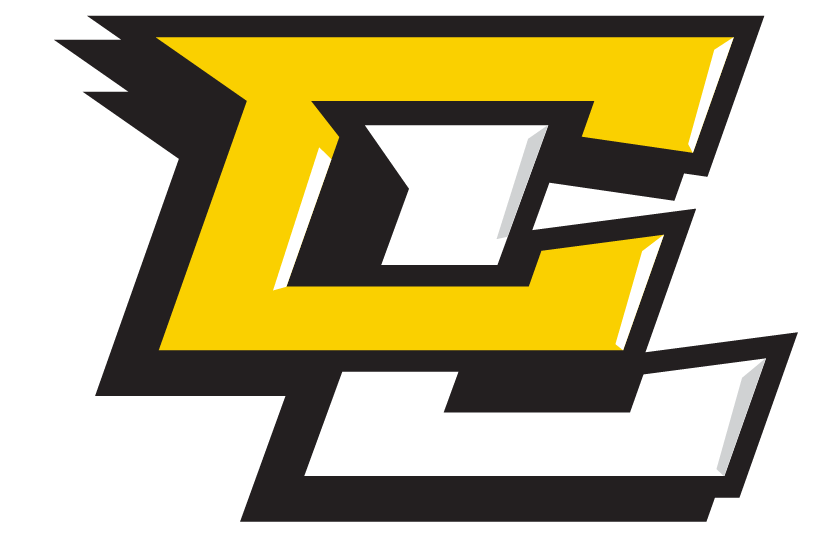

Location
- 2642 US Highway 218; Donnellson, Iowa 52625; United States; 40.924°N 91.539°W

Information
- School type: Public
- Motto: “Proud To Be Central Lee”
- Established: 1961
- School district: Central Lee Community School District
- Superintendent: Stacey Schmidt
- NCES School ID: 190693000302
- Principal: Nicole Herdrich
- Teaching staff: 24.05 (FTE)
- Grades: 9-12
- Enrollment: 318 (2023-2024)
- Student to teacher ratio: 13.22
- Campus type: Rural
- Colors: Black, White, Gold
- Slogan: Hawks Soar
- Fight song: Washington and Lee Swing
- Athletics conference: Southeast Iowa Superconference; South Division
- Mascot: Harold the Hawk
- Nickname: Hawks
- Affiliation(s): (Boys' sports) IHSAA and (Girls' Sports) IGHSAU
- Website: www.centrallee.org/page/high-school

Central Lee High School is a rural public high school located in Donnellson, Iowa, in Lee County. It is part of the Central Lee Community School District.

Central Lee High School mainly comprises students from Argyle, Montrose, and Donnellson. A significant portion of the students come from Franklin, Keokuk, and Fort Madison.

Central Lee offers a multitude of extracurricular activities to students, and offers early college classes through Southeastern Community College.

Harold the Hawk

== Athletics ==
The Hawks/Lady Hawks compete in the Southeast Iowa Superconference (South Division), in the following sports:

- Boys' & Girls' Cross country
- Girls' Volleyball
- Boys' & Girls' Wrestling
- Boys' & Girls' Basketball
- Boys' & Girls' Bowling
- Boys' & Girls' Track and field
- Boys' & Girls' Golf
- Boys' & Girls' Soccer
- Boys' Baseball
- Girls' Softball

For American Football (co-op with Holy Trinity) the Hawks compete in Iowa Class 2A District 6 (As of 2025).

=== Notable team state finishes ===
- Boys Baseball: 1989 (1st) Class 3A
- Boys Soccer: 2000 (4th) Class 1A
- Girls Basketball: 2000 (2nd) Class 3A
- Girls Cross Country: 1966 (1st)

== See also ==
- List of high schools in Iowa
