= Hillcrest Academy =

Private secondary school in Kalona, Iowa, United States

Coordinates: 41.5400°N 91.7888°W

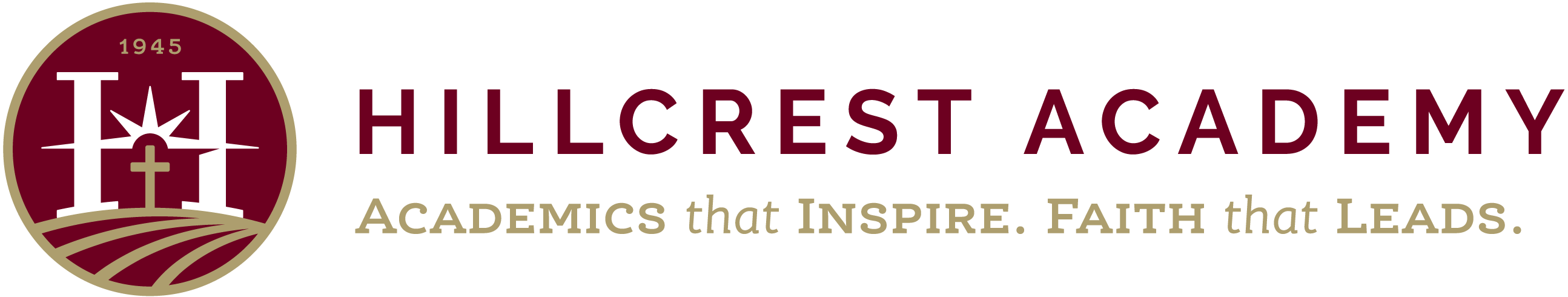

Location
- 1421 540th St. SW; Kalona, Iowa 52247

Information
- School type: Private
- Religious affiliation: Christian
- Established: 1945
- Principal: Nate Miller
- Head of school: Nate Miller
- Grades: 6 - 12
- Gender: Coed
- Enrollment: 178 (2025-2026) ~160 (2024-2025)
- Slogan: "Academics that Inspire. Faith that Leads."
- Athletics conference: Southeast Iowa Superconference; North Division
- Mascot: Ravens
- Affiliation(s): (Boys' sports) IHSAA and (Girls' Sports) IGHSAU
- Website: www.hillcrestravens.org

Hillcrest Academy (formerly Iowa Mennonite School) is an independent, Christian school near Iowa City, Iowa in Kalona, Iowa, United States.

== Academic Success ==
Hillcrest Academy has a long history of helping high school students thrive. Students gain more than just a strong academic foundation; they graduate with the skills to apply knowledge, confident in their talents, and ready to take their place as Christian leaders in their colleges and communities.

== Athletics ==
The Ravens have 62 state appearances, including 18 state championships since they sanctioned athletics in 1972.

The Ravens compete in the Southeast Iowa Superconference (North Division), in the following sports:

- Boys' & Girls' Cross country
- Girls' Volleyball
- Boys' & Girls' Basketball
- Boys' & Girls' Track and field
- Boys' & Girls' Golf
- Boys' & Girls' Soccer
- Boys' Baseball
- Girls' Softball

For American Football, the Ravens send their athletes to Williamsburg to compete in Iowa Class 3A District 5 (As of 2025).

== See also ==
- List of high schools in Iowa
