= Keokuk Catholic Schools =

Catholic school in Iowa, United States

Coordinates: 40.419771°N 91.402783°W

Keokuk Catholic Schools, also operating as St. Vincent's Elementary School is a Catholic School in Keokuk, Iowa.

It was established circa 1853. It previously consisted of two separate campuses, one being St. Vincent's School and one being Cardinal Stritch High School. The high school merged into Holy Trinity Catholic Schools of Fort Madison, Iowa in 2006, and the elementary school moved into the former high school building. At that time the St. Vincent's name was dropped, but by 2013 the school had plans to again use that name.
