= Fairfield Community School District =

Public school district in Fairfield, Iowa, United States

Location
- Fairfield, Iowa Jefferson County United States
- Coordinates: 41.0039°N 91.9842°W

District information
- Type: Public
- Motto: Dream. Think. Lead. Act.
- Grades: K–12
- Established: 1868
- Superintendent: Dr. Laurie Noll
- Schools: 4
- Budget: $25,750,000 (2020-21)
- NCES District ID: 1911340

Students and staff
- Students: 1,525 (2022-23)
- Teachers: 119.71 FTE
- Staff: 193.88 FTE
- Student–teacher ratio: 12.74
- Athletic conference: Southeast Conference
- District mascot: Trojans
- Colors: Orange and Black

Other information
- Website: www.fairfieldsfuture.org

Fairfield High School

Location
- 605 E Broadway; Fairfield, Iowa; United States

Information
- Type: Public Secondary
- Established: 1868
- School district: Fairfield Community School District
- Principal: Brian Stone
- Teaching staff: 32.74 FTE
- Grades: 9–12
- Enrollment: 513 (2018-19)
- Campus: Rural
- Colors: Orange and Black
- Mascot: Trojans
- Yearbook: Quill

Fairfield Community School District is a public school district located in Fairfield, Iowa. The district covers the majority of Jefferson County, extending slightly into Henry, Van Buren, Wapello, and Washington counties.

== Schools ==
The district operates four schools, all in Fairfield:

- Pence Elementary
- Washington Elementary
- Fairfield Middle School
- Fairfield High School

=== Fairfield High School ===
==== Athletics ====
The Trojans compete in the Southeast Conference in the following sports:

- Baseball
- Basketball
  - Girls' 1983 Class 3A State Champions
- Bowling
- Cross Country
  - Boys' 1949 Class A State Champions
- Football
- Golf
- Soccer
- Softball
- Tennis
- Track and Field
- Volleyball
- Wrestling

== Former schools ==
- Lockridge Elementary School - In 1966, the school board approved plans for an addition.

== See also ==
- List of school districts in Iowa
- List of high schools in Iowa
