= Keokuk High School =

Public secondary school in Keokuk, Iowa, United States

Location
- 2285 Middle Road; Keokuk, Iowa 52632; United States
- Coordinates: 40.450359°N 91.399834°W

Information
- Type: Public high school
- School district: Keokuk Community School District
- Superintendent: Dr. Kathy Dinger
- Principal: Nathan Harrison
- Associate Principal: Jen Roederer and Seth Davis
- Teaching staff: 38.62 (FTE)
- Grades: 9-12
- Enrollment: 583 (2024-2025)
- Student to teacher ratio: 15.10
- Colors: Purple & White
- Athletics conference: Southeast
- Mascot: Chiefs
- Newspaper: Chief Insights
- Website: www.keokukschools.org/keokuk-high-school/

Keokuk High School is a rural public four-year high school located in Keokuk, Iowa. The school, a part of the Keokuk Community School District, draws students from the southernmost part of Lee County, Iowa. For athletics, Keokuk High School is classified as 3A, the second largest class in Iowa. They are a member of the Southeast Conference.

== Athletics ==
The Chiefs compete in the Southeast Conference in several sports:

- Cross Country (boys & girls)
- Football (boys)
- Swimming (boys & girls)
- Volleyball (girls)
- Basketball (boys & girls)
- Bowling (boys & girls)
- Wrestling (boys & girls)
- Golf (boys & girls)
- Soccer (boys & girls)
- Track (boys & girls)
- Tennis (boys & girls)
- Baseball (boys)
- Softball (girls)

=== State championships ===
- Girls' Bowling - 2-time Class 1A State Champions (2009, 2012)
- Football - 2007 Class 3A State Champions
- Boys' Golf - 2-time State Champions (1966, 1996)
- Boys' Tennis - 1993 Class 1A State Champions
- Girls' Cross Country - 1986 Class 3A State Champions
- Boys' Cross Country - 1928 State Champions

== See also ==
- List of high schools in Iowa
