= Columbus Community School District =

Public school district in Columbus Junction, Iowa, United States

Coordinates: 41.269019°N 91.367506°W

Address
- 1208 Colton St. Columbus Junction, Iowa, 52738; United States
- Coordinates: 41.269019, -91.367506

District information
- Type: Public
- Grades: K-12
- Superintendent: Karinda Wahls
- Schools: 3
- Budget: $11,736,000 (2020-21)
- NCES District ID: 1907980

Students and staff
- Students: 664 (2022-23)
- Teachers: 55.52 FTE
- Staff: 48.87 FTE
- Student–teacher ratio: 11.96
- Athletic conference: Southeast Iowa Superconference; North Division
- District mascot: Wildcats
- Colors: Royal blue and White

Other information
- Affiliation(s): (Boys' sports) IHSAA and (Girls' Sports) IGHSAU
- Rivalries: The FalCat Rivalry (formerly known as the battle for the graffiti barn) with Louisa-Muscatine
- Website: www.columbus.k12.ia.us

The Columbus Community School District is a rural public school district headquartered in Columbus Junction, Iowa. It is mostly within Louisa County, with a smaller area in Muscatine County, and serves the towns of Columbus Junction, Columbus City, Conesville, Cotter, Fredonia, and the surrounding rural areas.

== Schools ==
The district operates three schools, all in Columbus Junction:

- Roundy Elementary School
- Columbus Community Junior High School
- Columbus Community High School

== Athletics ==
The Wildcats compete in the Southeast Iowa Superconference (North Division), in the following sports:

- Boys' & Girls' Cross country
- Girls' Volleyball
- Boys' & Girls' Wrestling (Co-op with Winfield Mt. Union)
- Boys' & Girls' Basketball
- Girls' Track and field
- Boys' Track and field (Co-op with Lone Tree)
- Boys' & Girls' Golf
- Boys' & Girls' Soccer (Co-op with Winfield Mt. Union)
- Boys' Baseball (Co-op with Winfield Mt. Union)
- Girls' Softball

For American Football, the Wildcats compete in Iowa Class A District 5 (As of 2025).

== See also ==
- List of school districts in Iowa
- List of high schools in Iowa
