= Crawfordsville, Iowa =

- City
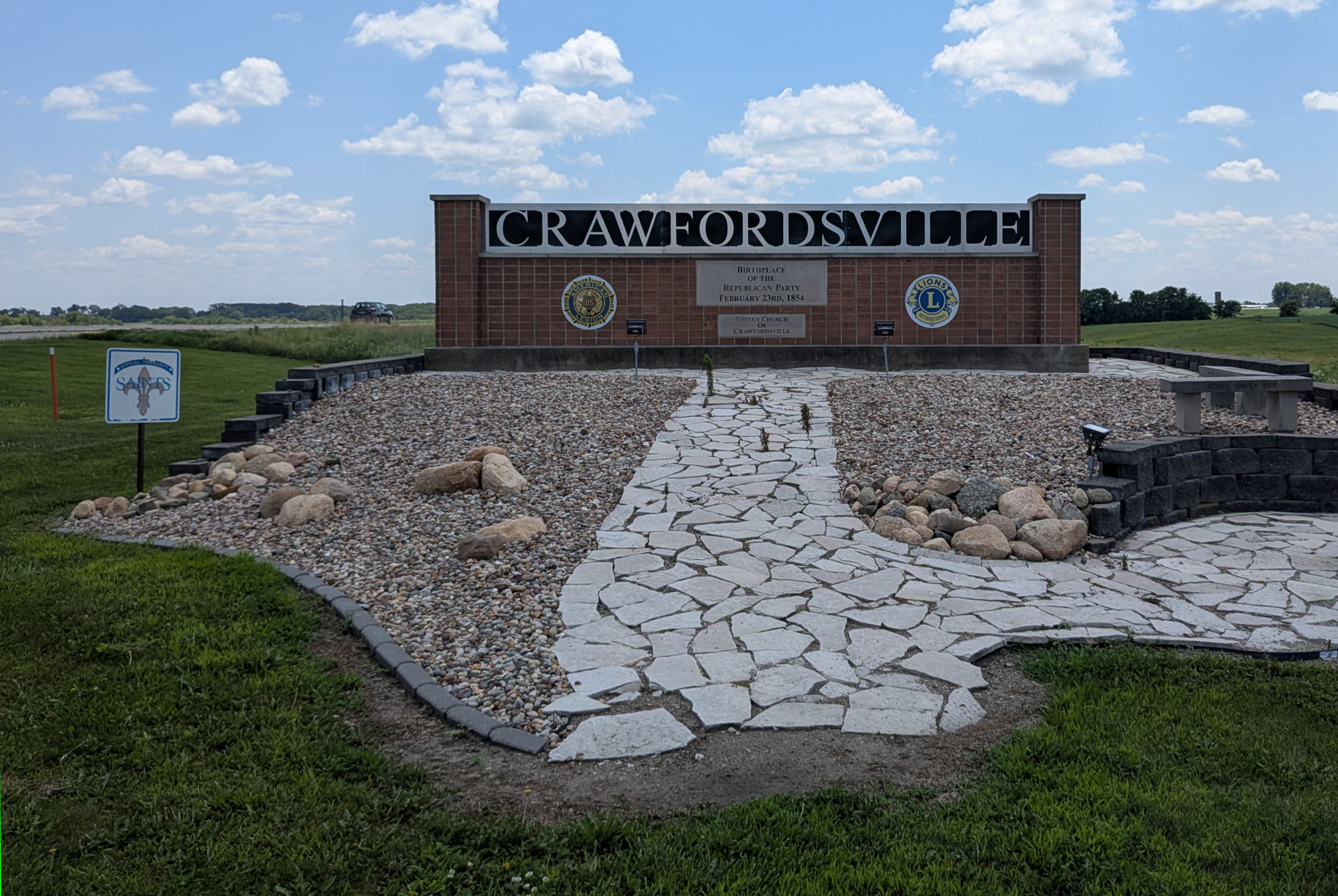
- Crawfordsville welcome sign
- Motto: Birthplace of the Republican Party
- Location of Crawfordsville, Iowa
- Coordinates: 41°12′50″N 91°32′12″W
- Country: United States
- State: Iowa
- County: Washington
- Incorporated: March 26, 1891

Area
  - Total: 0.37 sq mi (0.95 km^{2})
  - Land: 0.37 sq mi (0.95 km^{2})
  - Water: 0 sq mi (0.00 km^{2})
- Elevation: 728 ft (222 m)

Population (2020)
  - Total: 277
  - Density: 753.8/sq mi (291.05/km^{2})
- Time zone: UTC-6 (Central (CST))
  - Summer (DST): UTC-5 (CDT)
- ZIP code: 52621
- Area code: 319
- FIPS code: 19-17130
- GNIS feature ID: 2393665

Crawfordsville is a city in Washington County, Iowa, United States. It is part of the Iowa City, Iowa Metropolitan Statistical Area. The population was 277 at the 2020 census.

== History ==
Crawfordsville is named for the Crawford family of pioneer settlers.

The first private meeting of what would become the Republican Party came when Whig Party defectors met privately in Crawfordsville in February, 1854. The meeting was to lay the groundwork for the creation of a new political party. The first public meeting was held in Ripon, Wisconsin one month later.

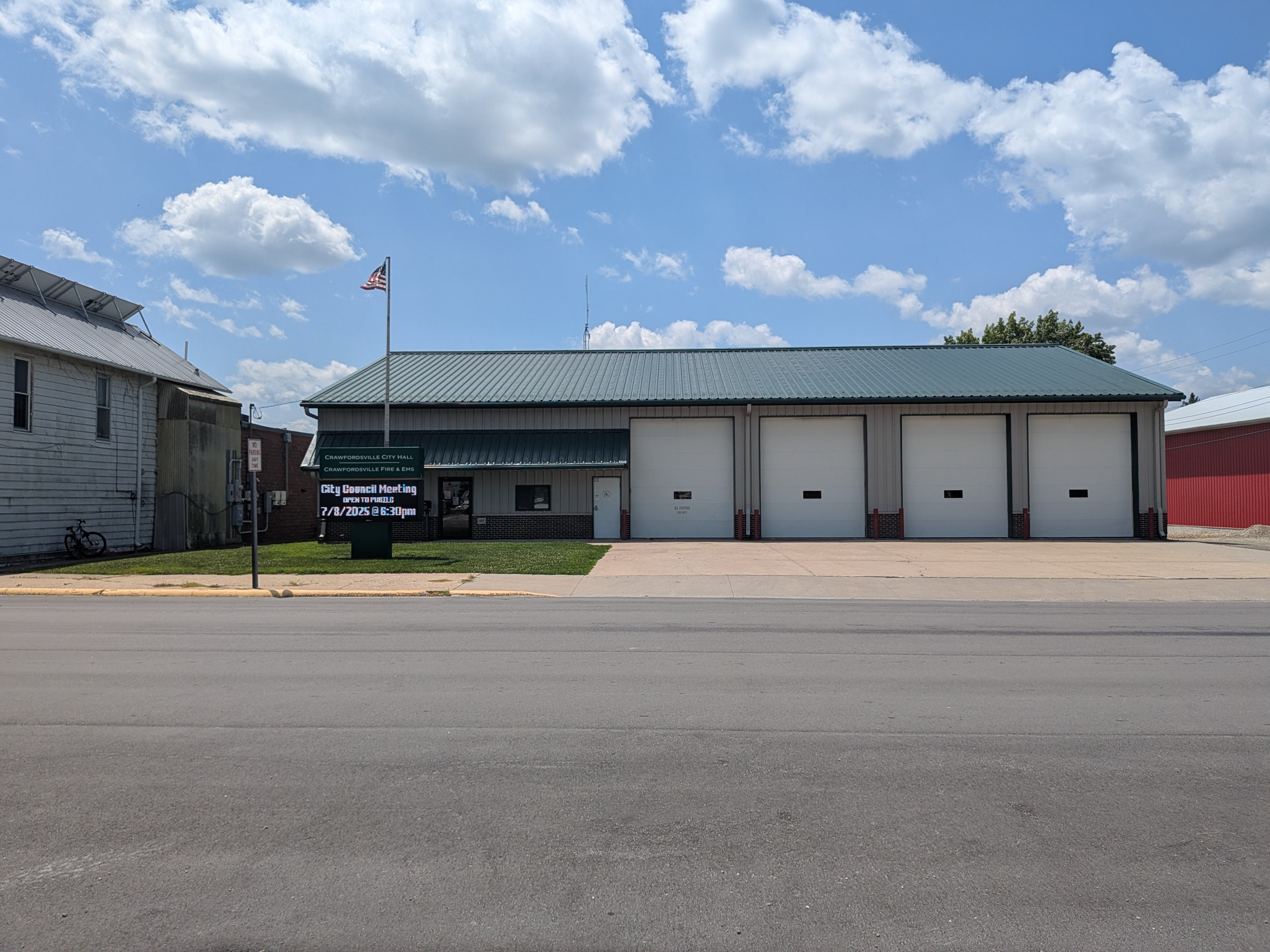
Crawfordsville city hall

== Geography ==
According to the United States Census Bureau, the city has a total area of 0.35 square miles (0.91 km^{2}), all of it land.

== Demographics ==
Historical populations
Year	Pop.	±%
1870	249	—
1880	265	+6.4%
1890	267	+0.8%
1900	268	+0.4%
1910	322	+20.1%
1920	337	+4.7%
1930	291	−13.6%
1940	316	+8.6%
1950	286	−9.5%
1960	317	+10.8%
1970	288	−9.1%
1980	290	+0.7%
1990	265	−8.6%
2000	295	+11.3%
2010	264	−10.5%
2020	277	+4.9%
Source:"U.S. Census website". United States Census Bureau. and Iowa Data Center; Source: U.S. Decennial Census

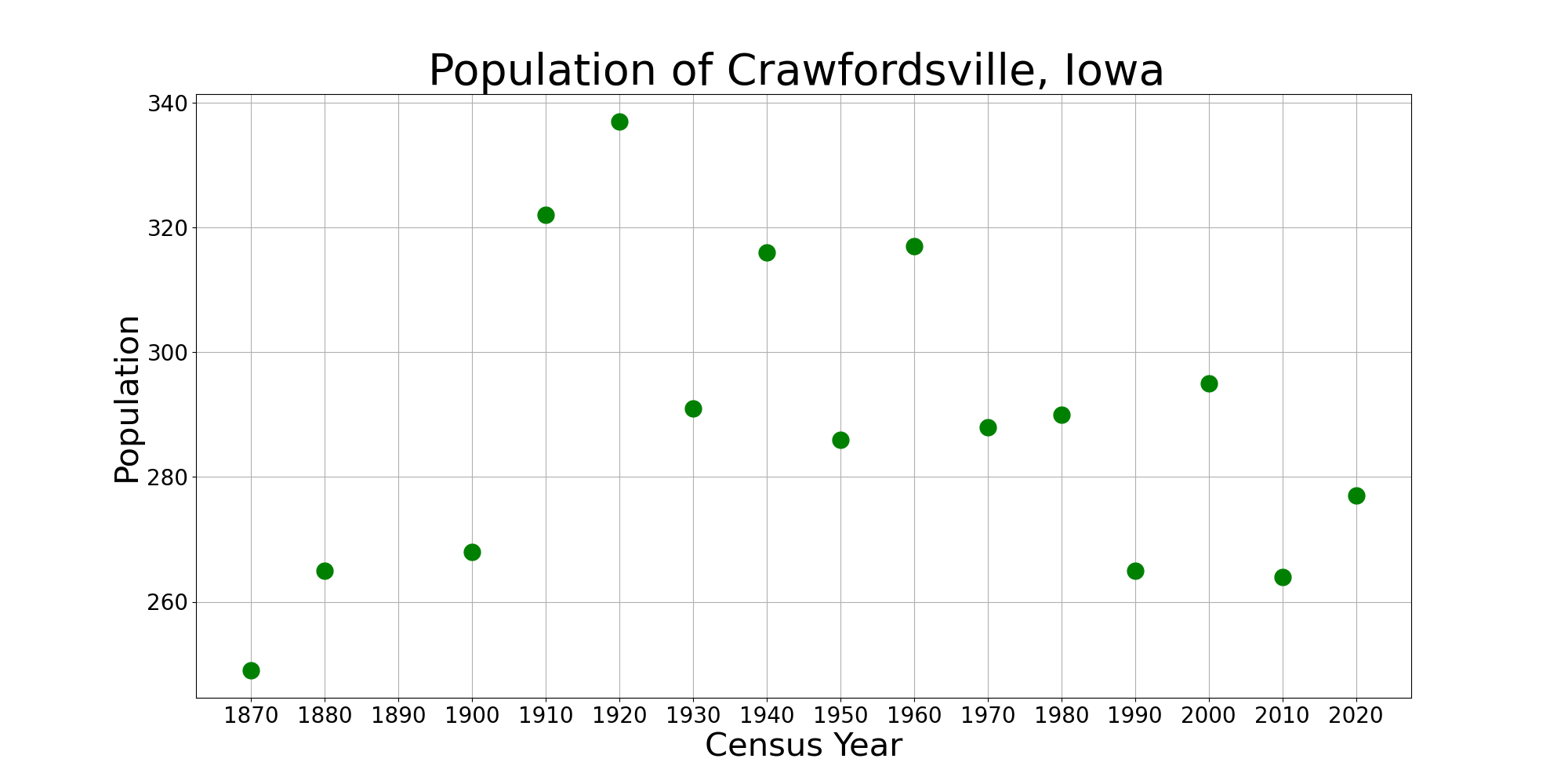
The population of Crawfordsville, Iowa from US census data

=== 2020 census ===
As of the census of 2020, there were 277 people, 106 households, and 77 families residing in the city. The population density was 753.8 inhabitants per square mile (291.1/km^{2}). There were 115 housing units at an average density of 313.0 per square mile (120.8/km^{2}). The racial makeup of the city was 86.3% White, 2.2% Black or African American, 0.0% Native American, 0.0% Asian, 0.0% Pacific Islander, 6.9% from other races and 4.7% from two or more races. Hispanic or Latino persons of any race comprised 8.3% of the population.

Of the 106 households, 36.8% of which had children under the age of 18 living with them, 49.1% were married couples living together, 7.5% were cohabitating couples, 27.4% had a female householder with no spouse or partner present and 16.0% had a male householder with no spouse or partner present. 27.4% of all households were non-families. 20.8% of all households were made up of individuals, 7.5% had someone living alone who was 65 years old or older.

The median age in the city was 35.9 years. 31.8% of the residents were under the age of 20; 3.6% were between the ages of 20 and 24; 24.9% were from 25 and 44; 23.1% were from 45 and 64; and 16.6% were 65 years of age or older. The gender makeup of the city was 46.6% male and 53.4% female.

=== 2010 census ===
At the 2010 census there were 264 people in 110 households, including 76 families, in the city. The population density was 754.3 inhabitants per square mile (291.2/km^{2}). There were 120 housing units at an average density of 342.9 per square mile (132.4/km^{2}). The racial makup of the city was 93.9% White, 0.8% African American, 1.1% Native American, 3.4% from other races, and 0.8% from two or more races. Hispanic or Latino of any race were 9.1%.

Of the 110 households 27.3% had children under the age of 18 living with them, 58.2% were married couples living together, 8.2% had a female householder with no husband present, 2.7% had a male householder with no wife present, and 30.9% were non-families. 28.2% of households were one person and 13.6% were one person aged 65 or older. The average household size was 2.40 and the average family size was 2.97.

The median age was 45.3 years. 23.9% of residents were under the age of 18; 8% were between the ages of 18 and 24; 17.7% were from 25 to 44; 32.6% were from 45 to 64; and 17.8% were 65 or older. The gender makeup of the city was 48.9% male and 51.1% female.

=== 2000 census ===
At the 2000 census there were 295 people in 117 households, including 78 families, in the city. The population density was 803.0 inhabitants per square mile (310.0/km^{2}). There were 122 housing units at an average density of 332.1 per square mile (128.2/km^{2}). The racial makup of the city was 99.66% White and 0.34% Native American. Hispanic or Latino of any race were 1.02%.

Of the 117 households 37.6% had children under the age of 18 living with them, 54.7% were married couples living together, 8.5% had a female householder with no husband present, and 33.3% were non-families. 29.1% of households were one person and 11.1% were one person aged 65 or older. The average household size was 2.52 and the average family size was 3.13.

The age distribution was 29.8% under the age of 18, 6.4% from 18 to 24, 30.5% from 25 to 44, 16.3% from 45 to 64, and 16.9% 65 or older. The median age was 36 years. For every 100 females, there were 102.1 males. For every 100 females age 18 and over, there were 99.0 males.

The median household income was $39,063 and the median family income was $38,571. Males had a median income of $28,036 versus $22,813 for females. The per capita income for the city was $17,238. None of the families and 2.0% of the population were living below the poverty line, including no under eighteens and 6.1% of those over 64.

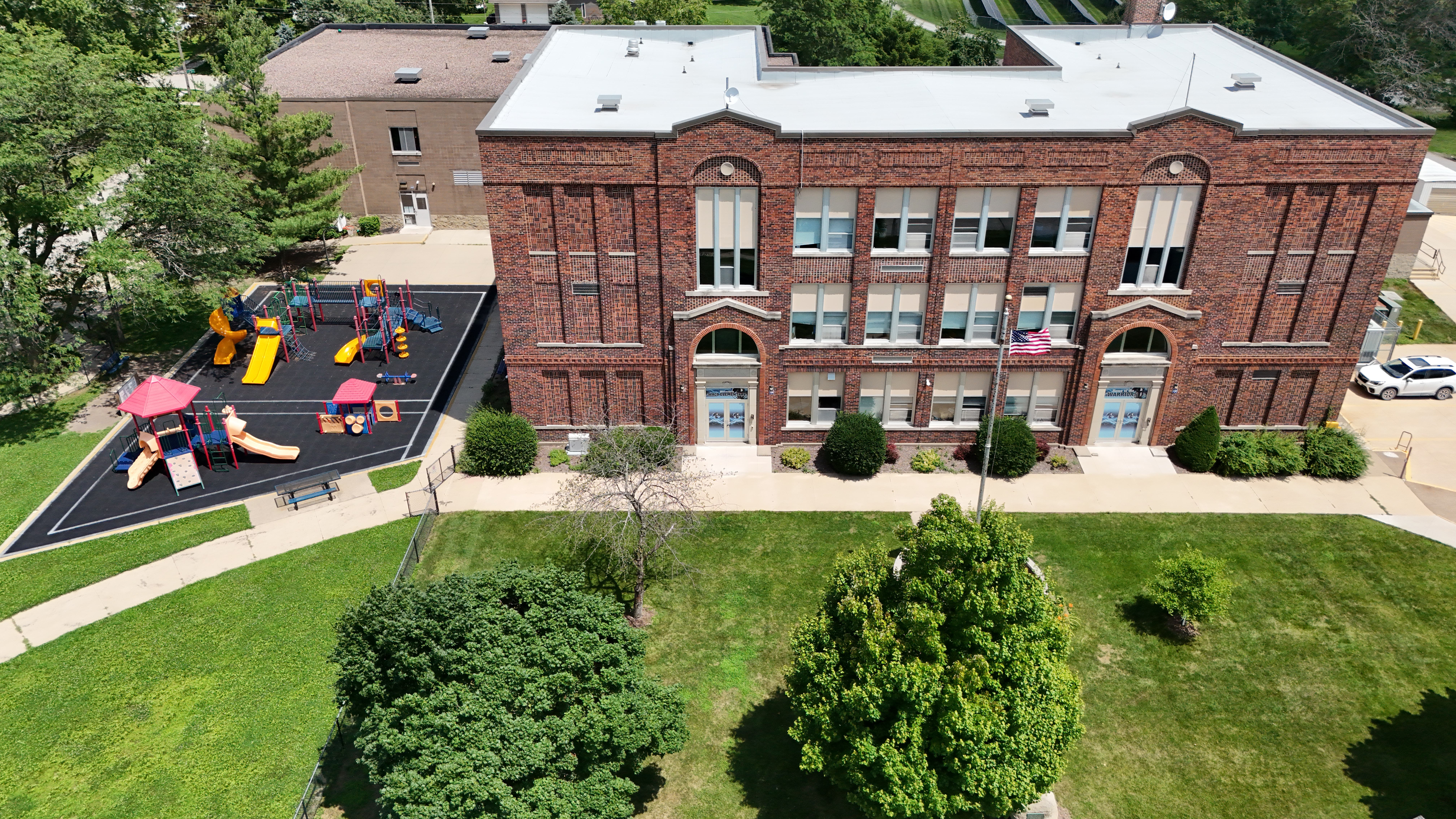
WACO Elementary School

== Education ==
WACO Community School District operates local public schools.
