= Olds, Iowa =

- City
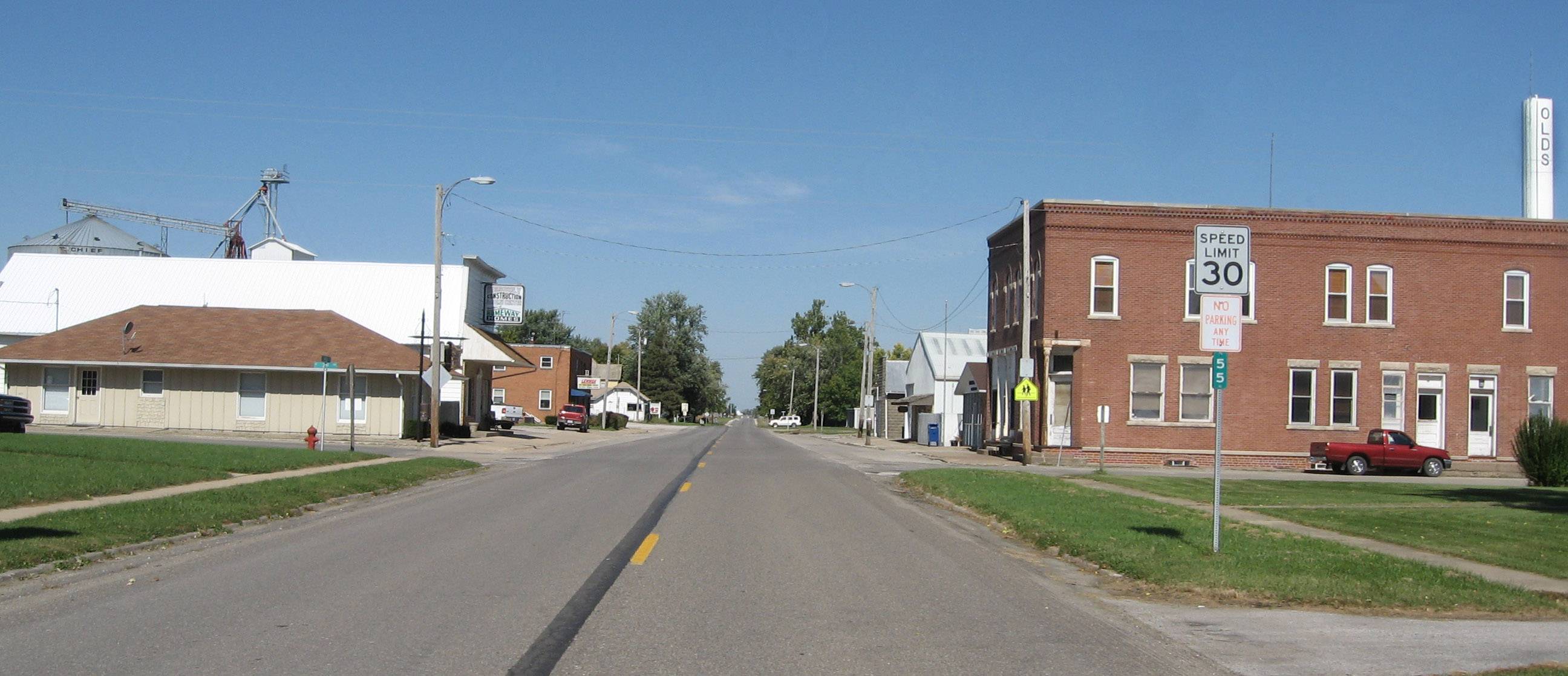
- Downtown Olds, Iowa

- Location of Olds, Iowa
- Coordinates: 41°08′03″N 91°32′38″W
- Country: United States
- State: Iowa
- County: Henry

Area
  - Total: 0.34 sq mi (0.88 km^{2})
  - Land: 0.34 sq mi (0.88 km^{2})
  - Water: 0 sq mi (0.00 km^{2})
- Elevation: 732 ft (223 m)

Population (2020)
  - Total: 192
  - Density: 563.0/sq mi (217.36/km^{2})
- Time zone: UTC-6 (Central (CST))
  - Summer (DST): UTC-5 (CDT)
- ZIP code: 52647
- Area code: 319
- FIPS code: 19-58890
- GNIS feature ID: 2396053
- Website: cityofolds.com

Olds is a city in Henry County, Iowa, United States. The population was 192 at the time of the 2020 census.

== Geography ==
According to the United States Census Bureau, the city has a total area of 0.34 square miles (0.88 km^{2}), all land.

== Demographics ==
Historical populations
Year	Pop.	±%
1910	165	—
1920	186	+12.7%
1930	227	+22.0%
1940	203	−10.6%
1950	187	−7.9%
1960	189	+1.1%
1970	206	+9.0%
1980	225	+9.2%
1990	205	−8.9%
2000	249	+21.5%
2010	229	−8.0%
2020	192	−16.2%
Source:"U.S. Census website". United States Census Bureau. and Iowa Data Center; Source: U.S. Decennial Census

=== 2020 census ===
As of the census of 2020, there were 192 people, 83 households, and 52 families residing in the city. The population density was 563.0 inhabitants per square mile (217.4/km^{2}). There were 101 housing units at an average density of 296.1 per square mile (114.3/km^{2}). The racial makeup of the city was 87.0% White, 3.6% Black or African American, 0.5% Native American, 0.5% Asian, 0.0% Pacific Islander, 3.1% from other races and 5.2% from two or more races. Hispanic or Latino persons of any race comprised 4.7% of the population.

Of the 83 households, 25.3% of which had children under the age of 18 living with them, 44.6% were married couples living together, 2.4% were cohabitating couples, 24.1% had a female householder with no spouse or partner present and 28.9% had a male householder with no spouse or partner present. 37.3% of all households were non-families. 34.9% of all households were made up of individuals, 10.8% had someone living alone who was 65 years old or older.

The median age in the city was 45.6 years. 21.9% of the residents were under the age of 20; 4.2% were between the ages of 20 and 24; 22.4% were from 25 and 44; 36.5% were from 45 and 64; and 15.1% were 65 years of age or older. The gender makeup of the city was 55.2% male and 44.8% female.

=== 2010 census ===
As of the census of 2010, there were 229 people, 93 households, and 64 families living in the city. The population density was 673.5 inhabitants per square mile (260.0/km^{2}). There were 105 housing units at an average density of 308.8 per square mile (119.2/km^{2}). The racial makeup of the city was 96.1% White, 0.4% African American, 1.7% Native American, 1.3% from other races, and 0.4% from two or more races. Hispanic or Latino of any race were 1.3% of the population.

There were 93 households, of which 35.5% had children under the age of 18 living with them, 51.6% were married couples living together, 11.8% had a female householder with no husband present, 5.4% had a male householder with no wife present, and 31.2% were non-families. 28.0% of all households were made up of individuals, and 5.4% had someone living alone who was 65 years of age or older. The average household size was 2.46 and the average family size was 2.92.

The median age in the city was 37.5 years. 29.3% of residents were under the age of 18; 7.4% were between the ages of 18 and 24; 24% were from 25 to 44; 24% were from 45 to 64; and 15.3% were 65 years of age or older. The gender makeup of the city was 53.3% male and 46.7% female.

=== 2000 census ===
As of the census of 2000, there were 249 people, 102 households, and 73 families living in the city. The population density was 839.5 inhabitants per square mile (324.1/km^{2}). There were 113 housing units at an average density of 381.0 per square mile (147.1/km^{2}). The racial makeup of the city was 95.98% White, 0.80% African American, 1.61% Native American, 0.80% from other races, and 0.80% from two or more races. Hispanic or Latino of any race were 2.01% of the population.

There were 102 households, out of which 40.2% had children under the age of 18 living with them, 56.9% were married couples living together, 9.8% had a female householder with no husband present, and 28.4% were non-families. 25.5% of all households were made up of individuals, and 12.7% had someone living alone who was 65 years of age or older. The average household size was 2.44 and the average family size was 2.86.

In the city, the population was spread out, with 30.5% under the age of 18, 10.0% from 18 to 24, 31.7% from 25 to 44, 16.5% from 45 to 64, and 11.2% who were 65 years of age or older. The median age was 31 years. For every 100 females, there were 91.5 males. For every 100 females age 18 and over, there were 86.0 males.

The median income for a household in the city was $31,875, and the median income for a family was $35,250. Males had a median income of $26,875 versus $20,694 for females. The per capita income for the city was $13,760. About 9.2% of families and 9.0% of the population were below the poverty line, including 5.8% of those under the age of eighteen and none of those 65 or over.

== Education ==
WACO Community School District operates local public schools.
