= Oskaloosa High School (Iowa) =

Public secondary school in Oskaloosa Iowa, United States

Location
- 1816 N. 3rd Extension; Oskaloosa, Iowa 52577; United States
- 41.3095°N 92.6402°W

Information
- School type: Public School
- School district: Oskaloosa Community School District
- NCES District ID: 1921870
- Superintendent: Mike Fisher
- Principal: Jeff Kirby
- Teaching staff: 40.76 (FTE)
- Grades: 9-12
- Enrollment: 620 (2023-2024)
- Student to teacher ratio: 15.21
- Sports: Football; Boys Basketball; Girls Basketball; Boys Soccer; Girls Soccer; Boys Tennis; Girls Tennis; Baseball; Softball; Track; Volleyball; Bowling; Boys Swimming; Girls Swimming; Boys Golf; Girls Golf
- Mascot: Indians
- Website: oskyschools.org/o/ohs

Oskaloosa High School is a public high school in Oskaloosa, Mahaska County, Iowa, USA. It serves about 700 students. Courses include offerings through William Penn University and Indian Hills Community College.

Jeff Kirby is the school's principal. The school has a marching band, jazz band, orchestra, and choir. It is the first high school to have a Pheasants Forever club. There is a Student Council and school newspaper as well as a robotics team.

The Indians are the school mascot and the school has a fight song / battle cry.

== Athletics ==
The Indians compete in the Little Hawkeye Conference in the following sports:

- Baseball
- Basketball (boys and girls)
  - 2019 Boys’ Class 3A State Champion
- Bowling
- Cross Country (boys and girls)
  - Boys' four-time State Champions (1935, 1936, 1938, 1957)
- Football
  - 1996 Class 3A State Champions
- Golf (boys and girls)
  - Boys' four-time State Champions (1975, 1985, 1993, 1994)
- Soccer (boys and girls)
- Softball
  - 2016 Class 4A State Champions
- Swimming (boys and girls)
- Tennis (boys and girls)
- Track and Field (boys and girls)
- Volleyball
- Wrestling
  - 2003 Class 3A State Champions

== Notable alumni ==
- Tyler Sash, former defensive back for the Iowa Hawkeyes at the University of Iowa and New York Giants NFL team
- Phil Jones (born June 6, 1948) is an American drummer, percussionist, and record producer. Jones played percussion with Tom Petty and the Heartbreakers in the early 80's both live and in the studio, while also playing drums and percussion on Tom Petty's solo album Full Moon Fever, which included the hit songs "Free Fallin'", "I Won't Back Down", and "Runnin' Down a Dream".[1] His work outside the group includes playing on the Del Shannon albums Drop Down and Get Me and Rock On!. He currently runs his own recording studio in Los Angeles called 'Robust Recordings'.[2]

== See also ==
- List of high schools in Iowa
