= Southeast Conference (Iowa) =

Iowa High School athletic conference

- Formerly: Southeast Six, Southeast 7
- Conference: IHSAA / IGHSAU
- Founded: 1958
- Sports fielded: 21
- No. of teams: 6
- Region: Southeastern Iowa
- Website: https://www.southeastconferenceia.org/

The Southeast Conference, formerly known as the Southeast 7, is an athletic conference made up of six high schools in the southeast corner of Iowa. All of the current schools compete at the 3A level, the second-largest in Iowa.

== History ==
This conference was once known as the Little Six Conference. In 1969 the high schools Bettendorf, Muscatine, and Assumption left the league for conferences that made more geographical sense.

Ottumwa, Burlington and Keokuk High Schools then invited Quincy, IL (Catholic Boys) to join them in a four-team league that maintained the Little Six Conference name. That affiliation fell apart after a couple of years.

Ottumwa High School and Keokuk High School, as the only remaining members, formed the Southeast 7 to meet their needs for a conference. The new league was made up of Keokuk High School, Fort Madison High School, Mt. Pleasant High School, Fairfield High School, Oskaloosa High School, Ottumwa High School, and Washington High School. Oskaloosa left the conference after the 1983 baseball season to join the South Central Conference. Oskaloosa returned after the 1995-1996 School year after being asked to leave the South Central Conference due to enrollment numbers and after being denied membership into the Little Hawkeye Conference due to travel distance. After Ottumwa went to the CIML and Oskaloosa was accepted into the Little Hawkeye Conference in 1998, the conference changed its official name to the Southeast Conference.

Starting with the 2019–2020 school year, Burlington joined the Southeast Conference, joining from the Mississippi Athletic Conference, of which it had been a charter member when formed (as the Mississippi Eight) in 1978.

The conference's schools have faced shrinking enrollment. Located in the southeast corner of the state, the cities with schools in the conference were some of the first cities settled in Iowa, but have seen their populations decline in the recent decades.

On March 11, 2026, the Oskaloosa Community School District formally submitted a letter of interest to the Southeast Conference seeking potential placement. The school district also submitted a LoI to the South Central Conference. It was announced on April 27, 2026 that Oskaloosa Community School District would be leaving the Little Hawkeye Conference for the Southeast Conference for the 2028-2029 school year.

On June 23, 2026, the Central Lee Community School District voted to request membership into the Southeast Conference. Central Lee is located in rural Donnellson, Iowa between Keokuk and Fort Madison, and currently competes in the Southeast Iowa Superconference (SEISC) with an enrollment of 267.

== Current members ==
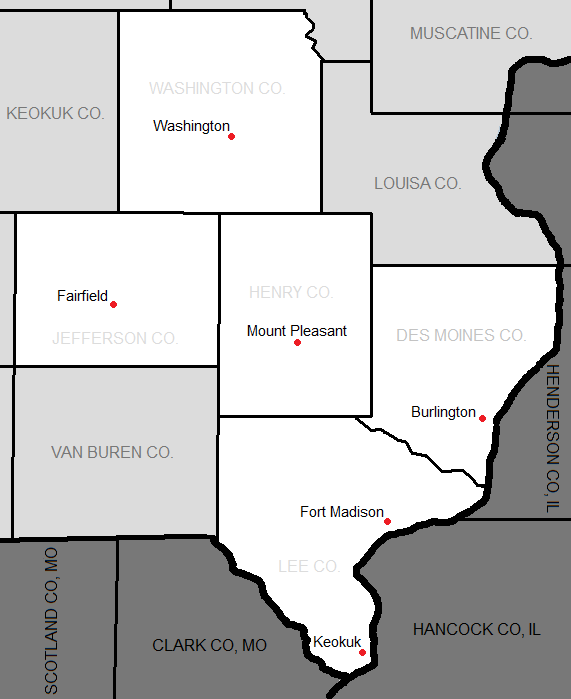
The members of the Southeast Conference.

School	Mascot	Colors	2026-2027 BEDS
Burlington	Grayhounds		723
Fairfield	Trojans		320
Fort Madison	Bloodhounds		415
Keokuk	Chiefs		390
Mount Pleasant	Panthers		388
Washington	Demons		327

=== Future member ===
School	Mascot	Colors	2026-2027 BEDS	Former Conference
Oskaloosa	Indians		465	Little Hawkeye Conference

== Former members ==
- Centerville, 1958-1972, Left For South Central Conference
- Davis County, 1958-1972, Left For South Central Conference
- Oskaloosa, 1969-1983 Left For South Central Conference, 1996-1998 Left for Little Hawkeye Conference
- Ottumwa, 1983-1998, Left for CIML
- Burlington, 1961–1969
- Bettendorf, ????-1969
- Muscatine, ????-1969
- Davenport Assumption, 1963–1969
- Quincy, IL Catholic Boys 1970–1971
