= Iowa Girls High School Athletic Union =

Regulator of Iowa high school athletics

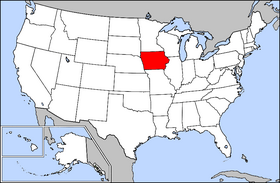
- Abbreviation: IGHSAU
- Legal status: Association
- Purpose: Athletic/Educational
- Headquarters: 5000 Westown Parkway, Suite 150; West Des Moines, Iowa 50266, United States
- Region served: Iowa
- Members: 369 high schools
- Official language: English
- Executive Director: Erin Gerlich
- Affiliations: National Federation of State High School Associations (affiliate)
- Staff: 16
- Website: ighsau.org
- Remarks: (515) 288-9741

The Iowa Girls High School Athletic Union (IGHSAU) is the governing body for girls' junior and senior high school sports in the U.S. state of Iowa. The association promotes and regulates interscholastic sports among its member schools. Though its counterpart for boys sports in Iowa, the Iowa High School Athletic Association, is a full-time member of the National Federation of State High School Associations, the IGHSAU is only an affiliate member. It is headquartered at 5000 Westown Parkway, Suite 150, West Des Moines, Iowa 50266.

Sports currently overseen by the IGHSAU are basketball, bowling, cross country, golf, soccer, softball, swimming & diving, track and field, tennis, volleyball, and wrestling.

Sports previously overseen by the IGHSAU were gymnastics, synchronized swimming, and indoor track and field.

== Administrative staff ==
Representation of the IGHSAU consists of an eight-person Board of Directors. Six positions are elected to the IGHSAU Board while two appointees representing the Iowa Association of School Boards and the Iowa Department of Education also serve. The Board of Directors approve policy changes proposed by the IGHSAU administrative staff.

The IGHSAU Representative Council meets twice a year.

=== IGHSAU Sport Advisory Committees ===
Each IGHSAU sport has an advisory committee made up of coaches, an official and an athletic director. These committees meet once a year to review their respective sports and develop recommendations for the IGHSAU administrative team to take to the IGHSAU Board of Directors.

=== IGHSAU Student Athlete Advisory Committee ===
The IGHSAU Student Athlete Advisory Committee is composed of female student-athletes from each of the state's four districts (NE, SE, NW, SW) along with three at-large representatives. Eleven girls were selected to two-year terms to meet about issues related to girls high school activities in Iowa. Committee members act as a voice for Iowa's female student-athletes and serve as a sounding board for the IGHSAU's Representative Council and the Board of Directors.

=== IGHSAU Executive Directors ===
Term span	Name
1947–1954	R.H. (Rod) Chisholm
1954–2002	Dr. E. Wayne Cooley
2002–2008	Troy Dannen
2008–2016	Mike Dick
2016–2024	Jean Berger
2024-present	Erin Gerlich

== Basketball ==
=== Classification guidelines ===
- 5A- Largest 40 schools by enrollment
- 4A- Next Largest 48
- 3A- Next Largest 64
- 2A- Next Largest 80
- 1A- Remaining schools

=== State Champions ===
From 1920 until 1984, there was one tournament for teams with 6 players.

IGHSAU State Basketball Champions
Year	6-Player
1920	Correctionville
1921	Audubon
1922	Audubon
1923	Audubon
1924	Audubon
1925	(tie) Aplington; Ida Grove
1926	Hampton
1927	Newhall
1928	Ida Grove
1929	Ida Grove
1930	Perry
1931	Avoca
1932	Parkersburg
1933	Hampton
1934	Wellsburg
1935	Centerville
1936	Centerville
1937	Guthrie Center
1938	West Bend
1939	West Bend
1940	Hansell
1941	Numa
1942	Clutier
1943	Steamboat Rock
1944	Wiota
1945	Wiota
1946	Coon Rapids
1947	Seymour
1948	Kamrar
1949	Wellsburg
1950	Slater
1951	Hansell
1952	Reinbeck
1953	Garnavillo
1954	Garnavillo
1955	Goldfield
1956	Maynard
1957	Garrison
1958	West Central
1959	Gladbrook
1960	Gladbrook
1961	Valley CEW
1962	Van Horne
1963	Guthrie Center
1964	West Monona
1965	South Hamilton
1966	Everly
1967	Mediapolis
1968	Union-Whitten
1969	Montezuma
1970	Montezuma
1971	Farragut
1972	Roland-Story
1973	Mediapolis
1974	Manilla
1975	Lake View-Auburn
1976	Lake View-Auburn
1977	Southeast Polk
1978	Ankeny
1979	Des Moines, East
1980	Ankeny
1981	Norwalk
1982	Estherville
1983	Fairfield
1984	Vinton

From 1985-1993, there was a tournament for 5-player teams and one for 6-player teams.

Year	6-Player	5-Player
1985	Fort Dodge	Linn-Mar
1986	Sibley-Ocheyedan	Marshalltown
1987	Ventura	Epworth, Western Dubuque
1988	Dike	Cedar Rapids, Washington
1989	Ankeny	Muscatine
1990	Atlantic	Columbus Catholic, Waterloo
1991	Emmetsburg	Cedar Falls
1992	Osage	Dowling Catholic, West Des Moines
1993	Hubbard-Radcliffe	Cedar Rapids, Jefferson

From 1994-2012, there were 4 classes, all with 5 players

Year	1A	2A	3A	4A
1994	Treynor	Solon	Central Clinton	Bettendorf
1995	Winfield-Mount Union	Center Point-Urbana	Vinton-Shellsburg	Cedar Rapids, Washington
1996	Winfield-Mount Union	Sibley-Ocheyedan	Carroll	Dowling Catholic, West Des Moines
1997	Lynnville-Sully	Solon	Carroll	Ankeny
1998	Lynnville-Sully	Solon	Kuemper Catholic, Carroll	Dowling Catholic, West Des Moines
1999	Lynnville-Sully	Audubon	Washington	Ankeny
2000	Preston	North Cedar	Washington	Dowling Catholic, West Des Moines
2001	Preston	Rock Valley	Washington	Cedar Falls
2002	Rock Valley	Mid-Prairie	Perry	Ankeny
2003	Rock Valley	Underwood	Xavier Catholic, Cedar Rapids	Ankeny
2004	Rockwell City-Lytton	Underwood	Waukon	Ankeny
2005	Charter Oak-Ute	Grundy Center	Xavier Catholic, Cedar Rapids	Ankeny
2006	IKM	North Butler	Norwalk	Des Moines, Roosevelt
2007	Graettinger-Terril	North Butler	Xavier Catholic, Cedar Rapids	Sioux City, North
2008	Springville	Assumption Catholic, Davenport	Bishop Heelan Catholic, Sioux City	Iowa City, City High
2009	AGWSR	IKM-Manning	Ballard	Sioux City, North
2010	Exira	Mount Vernon	Bishop Heelan Catholic, Sioux City	Linn-Mar
2011	Martensdale-St Marys	OABCIG	Assumption Catholic, Davenport	Des Moines, East
2012	North Mahaska	Western Christian, Hull	Assumption Catholic, Davenport	Iowa City, West

From 2013–present, there are 5 classes, all with 5 players

Year	1A	2A	3A	4A	5A
2013	Central Lyon	Western Christian, Hull	Assumption Catholic, Davenport	Xavier Catholic, Cedar Rapids	Southeast Polk
2014	Notre Dame Catholic, Burlington	Western Christian, Hull	MOC–Floyd Valley	Harlan	Dowling Catholic, West Des Moines
2015	Newell-Fonda	Unity Christian, Orange City	Nevada	Harlan	Waukee
2016	Springville	Unity Christian	Pocahontas Area	Mason City	Ankeny Centennial
2017	Springville	Western Christian	Pocahontas Area	North Scott	Valley (WDM)
2018	Springville	Cascade	Crestwood	Marion	Iowa City West
2019	Newell-Fonda	Treynor	Center Point-Urbana	North Scott	Valley (WDM)
2020	Newell-Fonda	North Linn	Bishop Heelan	North Scott	Johnston
2021	Newell-Fonda	Dike-New Hartford	Unity Christian	Ballard	Waukee
2022	Bishop Garrigan	Dike-New Hartford	Estherville-Lincoln Central	Xavier	Johnston
2023	Bishop Garrigan	Dike-New Hartford	Sioux Center	Dallas Center-Grimes	Pleasant Valley
2024	North Linn	Dike-New Hartford	Solon	Clear Creek-Amana	Johnston
2025	St. Albert Catholic	Hinton	Mount Vernon	Xavier	Johnston
2026	Newell-Fonda	Rock Valley	Maquoketa	Carlisle	Johnston

== Bowling ==
=== Classification guidelines ===
- 3A- Largest 30 schools by enrollment
- 2A- Next Largest 30
- 1A- Remaining schools

=== State Champions ===
From 2007-2014, 2 Classes

Year	1A	2A
2007	Red Oak	Ottumwa
2008	Louisa-Muscatine	Muscatine
2009	Keokuk	Ottumwa
2010	Oelwein	Muscatine
2011	Wahlert Catholic, Dubuque	Muscatine
2012	Keokuk	Ottumwa
2013	Wahlert Catholic, Dubuque	Waterloo, West
2014	Keokuk	Waterloo, West

From 2015–present, 3 classes:

Year	1A	2A	3A
2015	Camanche	Keokuk	Johnston
2016	Camanche	Waterloo, East	Johnston
2017	Louisa-Muscatine	Ottumwa	Johnston
2018	Louisa-Muscatine	Ottumwa	Prairie, Cedar Rapids
2019	Louisa-Muscatine	Fort Dodge	Waukee
2020	Louisa-Muscatine	Waterloo, East	Ottumwa
2021	Louisa-Muscatine	Le Mars	Ottumwa
2022	Louisa-Muscatine	Lewis Central	Davenport, Central
2023	Maquoketa	Lewis Central	Dubuque, Senior
2024	Camanche	Keokuk	Ottumwa

== Cross Country ==
=== State Champions ===
Source: From 1966–1977, one class:

Year	Champion
1966	Argyle Central
1967	Cedar Valley
1968	Adel
1969	BGM
1970	BGM & Manilla (tie)
1971	BGM
1972	Manilla
1973	Manilla
1974	Manilla
1975	North Fayette
1976	Decorah
1977	Bettendorf

From 1978–1980, two classes:

Year	Class	Champion
1978	3A; 2A-1A	Spencer; Missouri Valley
1979	3A; 2A-1A	Fort Madison; North Tama
1980	3A; 2A-1A	Cedar Rapids, Jefferson; Decorah

From 1981–2002, three classes:

Year	Class	Champion
1981	3A; 2A; 1A	Wahlert Catholic, Dubuque; New Hampton; North Tama
1982	3A; 2A; 1A	New Hampton; Decorah; North Tama
1983	3A; 2A; 1A	Pleasant Valley; Cascade, Western Dubuque; Belle Plaine
1984	3A; 2A; 1A	Bettendorf; Cascade, Western Dubuque; Woodbine
1985	3A; 2A; 1A	Pleasant Valley; Cascade; Maurice-Orange City
1986	3A; 2A; 1A	Keokuk; Maquoketa; Gehlen Catholic, Le Mars
1987	3A; 2A; 1A	Bettendorf; Cascade, Western Dubuque; Maurice-Orange City
1988	3A; 2A; 1A	North Scott; Cascade, Western Dubuque; Maquoketa Valley
1989	3A; 2A; 1A	Iowa City, City High; Gilbert; Tipton
1990	3A; 2A; 1A	Iowa City, City High; Cascade, Western Dubuque; Unity Christian, Orange City
1991	3A; 2A; 1A	Iowa City, City High; Cascade, Western Dubuque; Unity Christian, Orange City
1992	3A; 2A; 1A	Iowa City, City High; Cascade, Western Dubuque; Colfax-Mingo
1993	3A; 2A; 1A	Iowa City, City High; Waukon; Colfax-Mingo
1994	3A; 2A; 1A	Pleasant Valley; Unity Christian, Orange City; Tipton
1995	3A; 2A; 1A	Iowa City, City High; Maquoketa; Lynnville-Sully
1996	3A; 2A; 1A	Cedar Falls; Bennett-Durant; Lynnville-Sully
1997	3A; 2A; 1A	Iowa City, West; Sibley-Ocheyedan; Bennet-Durant
1998	3A; 2A; 1A	Iowa City, West; Benton; Calamus-Wheatland
1999	3A; 2A; 1A	Iowa City, City High; Benton; North Linn
2000	3A; 2A; 1A	Iowa City, West; Benton Community; Bennett-Durant
2001	3A; 2A; 1A	Iowa City, West; Union; Tipton
2002	3A; 2A; 1A	Iowa City, City High; Mount Pleasant; Bennett-Durant

From 2003–current, four classes:

Year	Class	Champion
2003	4A; 3A; 2A; 1A	Iowa City, City High; Xavier Catholic, Cedar Rapids; Tipton; Valley CEW
2004	4A; 3A; 2A; 1A	Iowa City, West; Marion; Tipton; Valley CEW
2005	4A; 3A; 2A; 1A	Iowa City, City High; Harlan; Tipton; North Tama
2006	4A; 3A; 2A; 1A	Iowa City, City High; Xavier Catholic, Cedar Rapids; Tipton; Valley CEW
2007	4A; 3A; 2A; 1A	Dowling Catholic, West Des Moines; Decorah; Union; St. Albert Catholic, Council Bluffs
2008	4A; 3A; 2A; 1A	Dowling Catholic, West Des Moines; Mount Vernon-Lisbon; Union; Pekin
2009	4A; 3A; 2A; 1A	Dowling Catholic, West Des Moines; Wahlert Catholic, Dubuque; Union; Nodaway Valley
2010	4A; 3A; 2A; 1A	Dowling Catholic, West Des Moines; Wahlert Catholic, Dubuque; Union; Pekin
2011	4A; 3A; 2A; 1A	Dowling Catholic, West Des Moines; Wahlert Catholic, Dubuque; Unity Christian, Orange City; Pekin
2012	4A; 3A; 2A; 1A	Pleasant Valley; Decorah; Unity Christian, Orange City; Griswold
2013	4A; 3A; 2A; 1A	Dowling Catholic, West Des Moines; Decorah; Gilbert; Pekin
2014	4A; 3A; 2A; 1A	Johnston; Decorah; Monticello; Pocahontas Area
2015	4A; 3A; 2A; 1A	Urbandale; Assumption Catholic, Davenport; Cascade, Western Dubuque; Central, Elkader
2016	4A; 3A; 2A; 1A	Johnston; Decorah; Monticello; Central, Elkader
2017	4A; 3A; 2A; 1A	Johnston; Wahlert Catholic, Dubuque; Mid-Prairie; Hudson
2018	4A; 3A; 2A; 1A	Southeast Polk; Wahlert Catholic, Dubuque; Mid-Prairie; Logan-Magnolia
2019	4A; 3A; 2A; 1A	Johnston; Ballard; Mid-Prairie; Logan-Magnolia
2020	4A; 3A; 2A; 1A	Johnston; Ballard; Mid-Prairie; Hudson
2021	4A; 3A; 2A; 1A	Johnston; Ballard; Mid-Prairie; South Winneshiek
2022	4A; 3A; 2A; 1A	Dubuque, Hempstead; Pella; Van Meter; Earlham
2023	4A; 3A; 2A; 1A	Johnston; Pella; Des Moines Christian; Madrid

== Golf ==
The standard team scoring format for golf tournaments, per NFHS guidelines, is to add up the scores of 6 players with each player playing 2 rounds of 18 holes. Teams are then ranked according to lowest score.

=== Classification guidelines ===
- 4A (fall golf) – Largest 48 schools*
- 3A (spring golf) – Next 64
- 2A (spring golf) – Next 96
- 1A (spring golf) – Remainder (129)

*Plus golf schools that play in 4A conferences that wish to play in the fall. In 2006–2007 there were 52 schools in class 4A

=== State Champions ===
Iowa State Championship Golf Tournament winners
Year	Class	Champion
1956		Waterloo, West
1957		Waterloo, West
1958		Dubuque
1959		Dubuque
1960		Dubuque
1961		Dubuque
1962		Dubuque
1963		Dubuque
1964		Knoxville
1965		Dubuque shortened tournament
1966		Wahlert Catholic, Dubuque
1967		Creston
1968		Valley, West Des Moines
1969		Wahlert Catholic, Dubuque
1970		Valley, West Des Moines
1971		Wahlert Catholic, Dubuque
1972		Wahlert Catholic, Dubuque
1973		Wahlert Catholic, Dubuque
1974		Wahlert Catholic, Dubuque
1975		Cedar Falls
1976		Valley, West Des Moines
1977		Valley, West Des Moines
1978		Valley, West Des Moines
1979		Valley, West Des Moines
1980	1A; 2A; 3A	Pocahontas; Denver; Burlington
1981	1A; 2A; 3A	Pocahontas; Decorah; Waterloo, West
1982	1A; 2A; 3A	Dayton; Dechorah; Valley, West Des Moines
1983	1A; 2A; 3A	Prairie, Gowrie; Grinnell; Valley, West Des Moines
1984	1A; 2A; 3A	Sibley; Decorah; Ottumwa
1985	1A; 2A; 3A	Sibley; Humboldt; Ottumwa
1986	1A; 2A; 3A	Britt; Atlantic; Ankeny
1987	1A; 2A; 3A	Sanborn; Humboldt; Ottumwa
1988	1A; 2A; 3A	East Central; Atlantic; Clinton
1989	1A; 2A; 3A	Denver; Maquoketa; Ames
1990	1A; 2A; 3A	BCLUW; Atlantic; Dubuque, Hempstead
1991	1A; 2A; 3A	Grundy Center; Grinnell; Dubuque, Senior
1992	4A; 3A; 2A; 1A	Ottumwa; Regis Catholic, Cedar Rapids; West Branch; Rock Valley
1993	4A; 3A; 2A; 1A	Oskaloosa; Clear Lake; Wapello; Rock Valley
1994	4A; 3A; 2A; 1A	Newton; Oskaloosa; Aplington-Parkersburg; Newman Catholic, Mason City
1995	4A; 3A; 2A; 1A	Dowling Catholic, West Des Moines; Kuemper Catholic, Carroll; Hudson; Newman Catholic, Mason City
1996	4A; 3A; 2A; 1A	Dowling Catholic, West Des Moines; Keokuk; Hudson; Maharishi, Fairfield
1997	4A; 3A; 2A; 1A	Ottumwa; Ballard; Colfax-Mingo; Hubbard-Radcliffe
1998	4A; 3A; 2A; 1A	Waterloo, West; Clear Lake; Center Point-Urbana; Gehlen Catholic, Le Mars
1999	4A; 3A; 2A; 1A	Marshalltown; Columbus Catholic, Waterloo; Anamosa; Gladbrook-Reinbeck
2000	4A; 3A; 2A; 1A	Burlington; Columbus Catholic, Waterloo; Wapello; Rockford
2001	4A; 3A; 2A; 1A	Marshalltown; Pella; Ballard; Sumner
2002	4A; 3A; 2A; 1A	Muscatine; Columbus Catholic, Waterloo; Belle Plaine; Sumner
2003	4A; 3A; 2A; 1A	Marshalltown; Pella; Grundy Center; Sumner
2004	4A; 3A; 2A; 1A	Bettendorf; Clear Lake; Columbus Catholic, Waterloo; Newman Catholic, Mason City
2005	4A; 3A; 2A; 1A	Bettendorf; Clear Lake; Grundy Center; West Monona
2006	4A; 3A; 2A; 1A	Bettendorf; Clear Lake; Emmetsburg; Hinton
2007	4A; 3A; 2A; 1A	Bettendorf; Ballard; Hampton-Dumont; Newman Catholic, Mason City
2008	4A; 3A; 2A; 1A	Valley, West Des Moines; Ballard; PCM; NU, Cedar Falls
2009	4A; 3A; 2A; 1A	Ottumwa; Ballard; Kuemper Catholic, Carroll; Newman Catholic, Mason City
2010	4A; 3A; 2A; 1A	Dowling Catholic, West Des Moines; Ballard; Kuemper Catholic, Carroll; Bishop Garrigan Catholic, Algona
2011	4A; 3A; 2A; 1A	Waukee; Clear Lake; Kuemper Catholic, Carroll; Newman Catholic, Mason City
2012	4A; 3A; 2A; 1A	Valley, West Des Moines; Decorah; Columbus Catholic, Waterloo; Bishop Garrigan Catholic, Algona
2013	4A; 3A; 2A; 1A	Waukee; Creston/Orient-Macksburg; Columbus Catholic, Waterloo; Sibley-Ocheyedan
2014	4A; 3A; 2A; 1A	Ankeny, Centennial; West Delaware; South Hamilton; Bishop Garrigan Catholic, Algona
2015	4A; 3A; 2A; 1A	Waukee; Webster City; Panorama; Bishop Garrigan Catholic, Algona
2016	4A; 3A; 2A; 1A	Waukee; Webster City; Panorama; East Buchanan
2017	4A; 3A; 2A; 1A	Valley, West Des Moines; Central DeWitt; Clear Lake; East Buchanan
2018	4A; 3A; 2A; 1A	Marshalltown; Central DeWitt; Kuemper Catholic, Carroll; Grundy Center
2019	4A; 3A; 2A; 1A	Waukee; Nevada; Des Moines Christian; Harris-Lake Park
2020	4A; 3A, 2A, 1A	Waukee; Spring season cancelled due to COVID-19
2021	4A; 3A; 2A; 1A	Waukee; Gilbert; West Branch; AGWSR
2022	4A; 3A; 2A; 1A	Cedar Falls; Gilbert; Hudson; Lake Mills
2023	4A; 3A; 2A; 1A	Johnston; MOC-Floyd Valley; Grundy Center; Hillcrest Academy, Kalona
2024	4A; 3A; 2A; 1A	Valley, West Des Moines; ADM; Beckman Catholic, Dyersville; Boyden-Hull

== Soccer ==
=== Classification guidelines ===
- 3A- Largest 40 schools by enrollment
- 2A- Next Largest 48
- 1A- Remaining schools

=== State Champions ===
From 1998–2001, one class:

Year	Champion
1998	Bettendorf
1999	Wahlert Catholic, Dubuque
2000	Wahlert Catholic, Dubuque
2001	Urbandale

From 2002–2010, 2 classes:

Year	1A	2A
2002	Assumption Catholic, Davenport	Wahlert Catholic, Dubuque
2003	Assumption Catholic, Davenport	Valley, West Des Moines
2004	Xavier Catholic, Cedar Rapids	Iowa City, West
2005	Wahlert Catholic, Dubuque	Valley, West Des Moines
2006	Xavier Catholic, Cedar Rapids	Valley, West Des Moines
2007	Xavier Catholic, Cedar Rapids	Valley, West Des Moines
2008	Xavier Catholic, Cedar Rapids	Valley, West Des Moines
2009	Xavier Catholic, Cedar Rapids	Cedar Rapids, Kennedy
2010	Xavier Catholic, Cedar Rapids	Valley, West Des Moines

From 2011–present, 3 classes:

Year	1A	2A	3A
2011	Assumption Catholic, Davenport	Xavier Catholic, Cedar Rapids	Ankeny
2012	Assumption Catholic, Davenport	Xavier Catholic, Cedar Rapids	Cedar Rapids, Kennedy
2013	Assumption Catholic, Davenport	Xavier Catholic, Cedar Rapids	Ankeny
2014	Assumption Catholic, Davenport	North Scott	Cedar Rapids, Kennedy
2015	Bishop Heelan Catholic, Sioux City	Ankeny	Iowa City, West
2016	Assumption Catholic, Davenport	Lewis Central	Ankeny, Centennial
2017	Assumption Catholic, Davenport	Lewis Central	Ames
2018	Assumption Catholic, Davenport	Lewis Central	Ankeny, Centennial
2019	Assumption Catholic, Davenport	Xavier Catholic, Cedar Rapids	Ankeny
2020	No season due to COVID-19		
2021	Assumption Catholic, Davenport	Waverly-Shell Rock	Valley, West Des Moines
2022	Des Monies Christian	Dallas Center-Grimes	Ankeny, Centennial
2023	Bishop Heelan Catholic, Sioux City	Dallas Center-Grimes	Johnston
2024	Nevada	Dallas Center-Grimes	Bettendorf
2025	Assumption Catholic, Davenport	Dallas Center-Grimes	Waukee Northwest
2026	Hudson	North Polk	Waukee Northwest

== Softball ==
=== Classification guidelines ===
- 5A- Largest 40 schools by enrollment
- 4A- Next Largest 48
- 3A- Next Largest 64
- 2A- Next Largest 80
- 1A- Remaining schools

=== State Champions ===
From 1957–1987, one class, summer and fall seasons:

Year	Summer champion	Fall champion
1957	Cedar Valley	Wheatland
1958	Argyle Central	Cedar Valley
1959	Roland	West Central
1960	Battle Creek	Roland
1961	Southeast Warren	Roland
1962	Woden-Crystal Lake	Southeast Warren
1963	Woden-Crystal Lake	Southeast Warren
1964	Hubbard	North, West Union
1965	Hubbard	South Hamilton
1966	Benton Community	South Hamilton
1967	Kingsley-Pierson	Kingsley-Pierson
1968	Southeast Warren	Kingsley-Pierson
1969	Wapsie Valley	Wapsie Valley
1970	Roland-Story	Central, Elkader
1971	Roland-Story	Adel
1972	NESCO	Roland-Story
1973	Clear Creek	Clear Creek
1974	Dubuque, Senior	Clear Creek
1975	Clear Creek	South Hamilton
1976	Ottumwa	North Polk
1977	Urbandale	Urbandale
1978	Ankeny	Ankeny
1979	Ankeny	Ankeny
1980	Ankeny	Charles City
1981	Des Moines, East	Ankeny
1982	Des Moines, Hoover	Roland-Story
1983	Cedar Rapids, Jefferson	Turkey Valley
1984	Davenport, West	Ankeny
1985	Dubuque, Senior	Ankeny
1986	Davenport, West	Ankeny
1987	North Scott	Urbandale

From 1988–1993, one class:

Year	Champion
1988	Webster City
1989	Muscatine
1990	Valley, West Des Moines
1991	Ankeny
1992	Dowling Catholic, West Des Moines
1993	North Scott

From 1994–2003, 3 classes:

Year	1A	2A	3A
1994	Lisbon	Carlisle	Ankeny
1995	Lisbon	Clarke	Ottumwa
1996	Lisbon	Carlisle	Ankeny
1997	Clear Creek-Amana	Carlisle	Cedar Rapids, Jefferson
1998	Woodward-Granger	Benton Community	Cedar Rapids, Jefferson
1999	Alburnett	Waukee	Des Moines, Lincoln
2000	North Polk	Waukee	Muscatine
2001	Colfax-Mingo	Webster City	Des Moines, Lincoln
2002	Woodbury Central	Clear Creek-Amana	North Scott
2003	Cardinal	Solon	Valley, West Des Moines

From 2004–2011, 4 classes:

Year	1A	2A	3A	4A
2004	Cardinal	Clear Creek-Amana	Spirit Lake	Dowling Catholic, West Des Moines
2005	Alburnett	Akron-Westfield	Norwalk	Valley, West Des Moines
2006	Akron-Westfield	North Polk	Clear Creek-Amana	Des Moines, East
2007	Highland	Solon	West Delaware	Valley, West Des Moines
2008	Newell-Fonda	North Polk	Winterset	Valley, West Des Moines
2009	Earlham	BCLUW	Clear Creek-Amana	Johnston
2010	Akron-Westfield	BCLUW	Carlisle	Valley, West Des Moines
2011	Akron-Westfield	Regina Catholic, Iowa City	Clear Creek-Amana	Des Moines, East

From 2012–present, 5 classes:

Year	1A	2A	3A	4A	5A
2012	Martensdale-St Marys	Treynor	Ballard	Indianola	Ankeny
2013	Akron-Westfield	Durant	Bondurant-Farrar	Dallas Center-Grimes	Dowling Catholic, West Des Moines
2014	Akron-Westfield	Earlham	Clarke	Dallas Center-Grimes	Johnston
2015	AGWSR	Regina Catholic, Iowa City	Solon	Dallas Center-Grimes	Waukee
2016	Kee	Van Meter	Benton Community	Oskaloosa	Johnston
2017	Kee	Regina Catholic, Iowa City	Assumption Catholic, Davenport	Winterset	Pleasant Valley
2018	Collins-Maxwell	Louisa-Muscatine	Assumption Catholic, Davenport	Des Moines, Hoover	Pleasant Valley
2019	Collins-Maxwell	North Linn	Assumption Catholic, Davenport	Carlisle	Valley, West Des Moines
2020	Clarksville	Ogden	Albia	Winterset	Cedar Rapids, Kennedy
2021	Newell-Fonda	North Linn	Assumption Catholic, Davenport	Epworth, Western Dubuque	Fort Dodge
2022	Twin Cedars	Regina Catholic, Iowa City	Mount Vernon	Winterset	Waukee, Northwest
2023	North Linn	Regina Catholic, Iowa City	Williamsburg	Winterset	Ankeny, Centennial
2024	Sigourney	Van Meter	Williamsburg	Carlisle	Pleasant Valley
2025	Clarksville	Van Meter	Williamsburg	Pella	Waukee, Northwest
2026	Clarksville	Grand View Christian	Wahlert Catholic, Dubuque	ADM	Waukee, Northwest

== Swimming & Diving ==
=== Classification guidelines ===
One class of swimming and diving.

=== State Champions ===
Year	Champion	Runner-up
1967	Des Moines, Roosevelt	Bettendorf
1968	Iowa City, City High	Des Moines, Roosevelt
1969	Des Moines, Hoover	(tie) Valley, West Des Moines (tie) Iowa City, City High
1970	Des Moines, Hoover	Valley, West Des Moines
1971 (spring)	Des Moines, Hoover	Cedar Rapids, Washington
1971 (fall)	Des Moines, Hoover	Valley, West Des Moines
1972	Des Moines, Roosevelt	Des Moines, Hoover
1973	Des Moines, Roosevelt	Ames
1974	Valley, West Des Moines	Cedar Rapids, Washington
1975	Valley, West Des Moines	Des Moines, Hoover
1976	Cedar Rapids, Washington	Des Moines, Hoover
1977	Cedar Rapids, Washington	Cedar Rapids, Kennedy
1978	Cedar Rapids, Kennedy	Cedar Rapids, Washington
1979	Cedar Rapids, Washington	Valley, West Des Moines
1980	Des Moines, Roosevelt	Valley, West Des Moines
1981	Cedar Rapids, Kennedy	Valley, West Des Moines
1982	Muscatine	Des Moines, Hoover
1983	Des Moines, Hoover	(tie)Cedar Rapids, Washington (tie)Iowa City, West
1984	Cedar Rapids, Washington	Des Moines, Hoover
1985	Muscatine	Cedar Falls
1986	Cedar Falls	Cedar Rapids, Kennedy
1987	Mason City	Valley, West Des Moines
1988	Mason City	Northern University, Cedar Falls
1989	Mason City	Valley, West Des Moines
1990	Bettendorf	Mason City
1991	Bettendorf	Cedar Falls
1992	Bettendorf	Cedar Falls
1993	Cedar Falls	Bettendorf
1994	Cedar Falls	Marshalltown
1995	Cedar Falls	Valley, West Des Moines
1996	Cedar Falls	Dubuque, Senior
1997	Cedar Falls	Bettendorf
1998	Cedar Falls	Dubuque, Senior
1999	Bettendorf	Cedar Falls
2000	Bettendorf	Dowling Catholic, West Des Moines
2001	Bettendorf	Cedar Falls
2002	Bettendorf	Valley, West Des Moines
2003	Cedar Falls	Valley, West Des Moines
2004	Cedar Falls	Ankeny
2005	Valley, West Des Moines	Cedar Falls
2006	Valley, West Des Moines	Marshalltown
2007	Valley, West Des Moines	Marshalltown
2008	Valley, West Des Moines	Cedar Falls
2009	Mason City	Bettendorf
2010	Ames	Valley, West Des Moines
2011	Ames	Valley, West Des Moines
2012	Ames	Pleasant Valley
2013	Ames	Pleasant Valley
2014	Pleasant Valley	Ames
2015	Ames	Pleasant Valley
2016	Ames	Johnston
2017	Ames	Dowling Catholic, West Des Moines
2018	Ames	Dowling Catholic, West Des Moines
2019	Dowling Catholic, West Des Moines	Ames
2020	Johnston	Bettendorf
2021	Waukee	Ames
2022	Waukee	Dowling Catholic, West Des Moines
2023	Waukee	Dowling Catholic, West Des Moines

== Tennis ==
=== Classification guidelines ===
- 2A - Largest 48 schools by enrollment
- 1A - Remaining schools

=== State Champions ===
IGHSAU Tennis Team Champions
Year	1A champion	2A champion
1983	Wahlert Catholic, Dubuque	
1984	Columbus Catholic, Waterloo	
1985	Columbus Catholic, Waterloo	
1986	Columbus Catholic, Waterloo	
1987	Cedar Rapids, Washington	
1988	Columbus Catholic, Waterloo	
1989	Columbus Catholic, Waterloo	
1990	Cedar Rapids, Jefferson	
1991	Wahlert Catholic, Dubuque	
1992	Columbus Catholic, Waterloo	
1993	Valley, West Des Moines	
1994	Decorah	Valley, West Des Moines
1995	Columbus Catholic, Waterloo	Bettendorf
1996	Bishop Heelan Catholic, Sioux City	Bettendorf
1997	Camanche	Bettendorf
1998	Decorah	Bettendorf
1999	Decorah	Bettendorf
2000	Decorah	Bettendorf
2001	Columbus Catholic, Waterloo	Valley, West Des Moines
2002	Columbus Catholic, Waterloo	Urbandale
2003	Decorah	Bettendorf
2004	Columbus Catholic, Waterloo	Iowa City, West
2005	Columbus Catholic, Waterloo	Iowa City, West
2006	Columbus Catholic, Waterloo	Iowa City, West
2007	Columbus Catholic, Waterloo	Cedar Rapids, Kennedy
2008	Camanche	Boone
2009	Wahlert Catholic, Dubuque	Ames
2010	Camanche	Ames
2011	Columbus Catholic, Waterloo	Ames
2012	Camanche	Ames
2013	Columbus Catholic, Waterloo	Clinton
2014	Columbus Catholic, Waterloo	Cedar Rapids, Washington
2015	Columbus Catholic, Waterloo	Des Moines, Roosevelt
2016	Columbus Catholic, Waterloo	Prairie, Cedar Rapids
2017	Columbus Catholic, Waterloo	Pleasant Valley
2018	Columbus Catholic, Waterloo	Iowa City, West
2019	Xavier Catholic, Cedar Rapids	Ames
2020	No season due to COVID-19	
2021	Xavier Catholic, Cedar Rapids	Dowling Catholic, West Des Moines
2022	Columbus Catholic, Waterloo	Dowling Catholic, West Des Moines
2023	Columbus Catholic, Waterloo	Cedar Rapids, Washington
2024	Pella	Dowling Catholic, West Des Moines

== Track and Field ==
=== Classification guidelines ===
- 4A- Largest 48 schools by enrollment
- 3A- Next Largest 64
- 2A- Next Largest 96
- 1A- Remaining schools

=== State Champions ===
==== From 1962 to 1976: one class ====
Track All-Time & State Champions List
Year	State Champion
1962	Sentral
1963	Sentral
1964	Belle Plaine
1965	Belle Plaine
1966	Belle Plaine
1967	Manilla
1968	Rolfe
1969	Manilla
1970	BGM & Manilla (tie)
1971	Manilla
1972	Collins
1973	Woodbine
1974	Woodbine
1975	Woodbine
1976	Davenport, West

==== From 1977 to 2003: 3 classes ====
Track All-Time & State Champions List
Year	1A	2A	3A
1977	Manilla	Western Christian, Hull	Davenport, West
1978	Manilla	Western Christian, Hull	Kanawha
1979	North Tama	Sioux Center	Indianola
1980	North Tama	Sioux Center	Indianola
1981	North Tama	St. Albert Catholic, Council Bluffs	Ankeny
1982	Titonka	Starmount	Davenport, Central
1983	Gehlen Catholic, Le Mars	Atlantic	Waverly-Shell Rock
1984	Belle Plaine	Sheldon	Davenport, Central
1985	Laurens-Marathon	Mount Vernon	Pleasant Valley
1986	Laurens-Marathon	Camanche	Bettendorf
1987	Laurens-Marathon	Camanche	Ames
1988	Mount Ayr	Tipton	Ames
1989	WACO	Tipton	Bettendorf
1990	Sigourney	Central Clinton	Bettendorf
1991	Sigourney	Tipton	Pleasant Valley
1992	Sigourney	Unity Christian, Orange City	Ames
1993	Woodbine	Eddyville	Indianola
1994	Gehlen Catholic, Le Mars	Jefferson-Scranton	Indianola
1995	Regina Catholic, Iowa City	Davis County/Fox Valley	Ames
1996	West Hancock	New Hampton	Ames
1997	Andrew	Benton Community & South Winneshiek (tie)	Iowa City, City High
1998	Belle Plaine	Atlantic	Iowa City, City High
1999	South Winneshiek	Atlantic	Iowa City, City High
2000	St. Albert Catholic, Council Bluffs	Atlantic	Iowa City, West
2001	Aplington-Parkersburg	Atlantic	Iowa City, West
2002	Northern University, Cedar Falls	Central Clinton	Iowa City, City High
2003	Gehlen Catholic, Le Mars & Northeast (tie)	Atlantic	Iowa City, City High

==== From 2004 to current: 4 classes ====
Track All-Time & State Champions List
2004	North Linn & Tri-Center (tie)	Tipton	Atlantic & Mount Pleasant (tie)	Iowa City, City High
2005	North Linn	Tipton	Mount Pleasant	Valley, West Des Moines
2006	North Tama	Tipton	Mount Pleasant	Iowa City, West
2007	North Tama	Tipton	Benton Community	Iowa City, West
2008	North Tama	North Polk	Benton Community	Iowa City, West
2009	North Tama	Logan-Magnolia	Mount Vernon-Lisbon	Iowa City, West
2010	Central Lyon	Gilbert & Solon (tie)	Mount Vernon-Lisbon	Iowa City, West
2011	Griswold	Logan-Magnolia	Wahlert Catholic, Dubuque	Iowa City, City High
2012	Griswold	Cascade, Western Dubuque	Wahlert Catholic, Dubuque	Waukee
2013	Griswold	Western Christian, Hull	Assumption Catholic, Davenport	Waukee
2014	North Linn	Cascade, Western Dubuque	Assumption Catholic, Davenport	Urbandale
2015	Hudson	Clayton Ridge	Assumption Catholic, Davenport	Pleasant Valley
2016	West Hancock	Cascade, Western Dubuque	Assumption Catholic, Davenport	Waukee
2017	Sigourney	Cascade, Western Dubuque	Assumption Catholic, Davenport	Waukee
2018	Danville	Mid-Prairie	Pella	Waukee
2019	Alburnett & Kee (tie)	Mid-Prairie	Glenwood	Waukee
2020	No season due to COVID-19			
2021	Madrid	Mid-Prairie	Wahlert Catholic, Dubuque	Waukee
2022	Nashua-Plainfield	Mid-Prairie	Solon	Waukee Northwest
2023	Calamus-Wheatland	Van Meter	Solon	Waukee Northwest
2024	Saint Ansgar	Van Meter	ADM	Pleasant Valley
2025	St. Albert	Pella Christian	ADM	Waukee Northwest
2026	Edgewood-Colesburg	Pella Christian	Mount Vernon	Waukee Northwest

==== Para Class ====
Track All-Time & State Champions List
2022	Dubuque, Hempstead
2023	Dubuque, Hempstead
2024	Dubuque, Hempstead & Iowa City, West (tie)

== Volleyball ==
=== Classification guidelines ===
- 5A- Largest 40 schools by enrollment
- 4A- Next Largest 48
- 3A- Next Largest 64
- 2A- Next Largest 80
- 1A- Remaining schools

=== State Champions ===
From 1970–1973, one class, winter season play only:

Year	Champion
1970	Davenport, West
1971	Fort Dodge
1972	Carroll
1973	Mason City

From 1973–1980, one class:

Year	Champion
1973	Dubuque, Senior
1974	Wahlert Catholic, Dubuque
1975	Dubuque, Hempstead
1976	Wahlert Catholic, Dubuque
1977	Wahlert Catholic, Dubuque
1978	Wahlert Catholic, Dubuque
1979	Cedar Rapids, Kennedy
1980	Dubuque, Senior

From 1981–1993, 2 classes:

Year	1A	2A
1981	Mater Dei Catholic, Clinton	Davenport, Central
1982	Mater Dei Catholic, Clinton	Sioux City, North
1983	Mater Dei Catholic, Clinton	Dubuque, Senior
1984	Mount Vernon	Fort Dodge
1985	Dike	North Scott
1986	Dike	Wahlert Catholic, Dubuque
1987	Dike	Wahlert Catholic, Dubuque
1988	Dike	Davenport, North
1989	Dike	Western Christian, Hull
1990	Unity Christian, Orange City	Wahlert Catholic, Dubuque
1991	Marquette Catholic, West Point	Wahlert Catholic, Dubuque
1992	Lincoln, Stanwood	Wahlert Catholic, Dubuque
1993	Unity Christian, Orange City	Western Christian, Hull

From 1994–2002, 3 classes:

Year	1A	2A	3A
1994	Dike-New Hartford	Western Christian, Hull	Marshalltown
1995	Eldora-New Providence	Western Christian, Hull	Wahlert Catholic, Dubuque
1996	Marquette Catholic, West Point	Unity Christian, Orange City	Wahlert Catholic, Dubuque
1997	Dike-New Hartford	Unity Christian, Orange City	Davenport, North
1998	Eldora-New Providence	Western Christian, Hull	Iowa City, City High
1999	Tripoli	Iowa Falls	Bishop Heelan Catholic, Sioux City
2000	Tripoli	Unity Christian, Orange City	Wahlert Catholic, Dubuque
2001	Tripoli	Western Christian, Hull	Wahlert Catholic, Dubuque
2002	Grandview Park Baptist, Des Moines	Western Christian, Hull	Wahlert Catholic, Dubuque

From 2003–2011, 4 classes:

Year	1A	2A	3A	4A
2003	Tripoli	Western Christian, Hull	Wahlert Catholic, Dubuque	Dubuque, Hempstead
2004	Tripoli	Western Christian, Hull	Wahlert Catholic, Dubuque	Ankeny
2005	Tripoli	Aplington-Parkersburg	Wahlert Catholic, Dubuque	Ankeny
2006	Wapsie Valley	Western Christian, Hull	Bishop Heelan Catholic, Sioux City	Iowa City, City High
2007	Wapsie Valley	Western Christian, Hull	Bishop Heelan Catholic, Sioux City	Johnston
2008	Tripoli	Western Christian, Hull	Marion	Ankeny
2009	Tripoli	Mount Vernon	Waverly-Shell Rock	Ankeny
2010	Tripoli	Western Christian, Hull	Mount Vernon	Iowa City, West
2011	Tripoli	Dike-New Hartford	Waverly-Shell Rock	Iowa City, West

From 2012–present, 5 classes

Year	1A	2A	3A	4A	5A
2012	Tripoli	Dike-New Hartford	MOC-Floyd Valley	Charles City	Bettendorf
2013	Janesville	Dike-New Hartford	MOC-Floyd Valley	Harlan	Bettendorf
2014	Holy Trinity Catholic, Fort Madison	Dike-New Hartford	Solon	Harlan	Ankeny, Centennial
2015	Janesville	Western Christian, Hull	Nevada	West Delaware	Ankeny, Centennial
2016	Janesville	Western Christian, Hull	Dike-New Hartford	Wahlert Catholic, Dubuque	Ankeny, Centennial
2017	Janesville	Dike-New Hartford	Columbus Catholic, Waterloo	Wahlert Catholic, Dubuque	Cedar Falls
2018	Janesville	Western Christian, Hull	Kuemper Catholic, Carroll	Wahlert Catholic, Dubuque	Ankeny, Centennial
2019	Sidney	Western Christian, Hull	Mount Vernon	Sergeant Bluff-Luton	Cedar Falls
2020	Notre Dame Catholic, Burlington	Dike-New Hartford	Osage	Xavier Catholic, Cedar Rapids	Ankeny
2021	Notre Dame Catholic, Burlington	Dike-New Hartford	West Delaware	Epworth, Western Dubuque	Pleasant Valley
2022	Ankeny Christian	Western Christian, Hull	Assumption Catholic, Davenport	Xavier Catholic, Cedar Rapids	Iowa City, Liberty
2023	Ankeny Christian	Dike-New Hartford	Western Christian, Hull	North Scott	Waukee, Northwest
2024	Ankeny Christian	Denver	Mount Vernon	Bishop Heelan Catholic, Sioux City	Pleasant Valley
2025	St. Ansgar	Denver	Assumption Catholic, Davenport	North Scott	Waukee, Northwest

== Wrestling ==
Wrestling has been an IGHSAU sponsored sport since 2022. State championships are awarded to a single team and individuals at the individual state tournament. There is currently no team dual state championship.

On 23 May 2024, it was announced that due to the explosion of participation in the sport, wrestling would move to two classes for the 2024-2025 season. The largest 64 schools would compete in class 2A, and the remaining schools in 1A.

=== Weight Classifications ===
- 100 pounds
- 105 pounds
- 110 pounds
- 115 pounds
- 120 pounds
- 125 pounds
- 130 pounds
- 135 pounds
- 140 pounds
- 145 pounds
- 155 pounds
- 170 pounds
- 190 pounds
- 235 pounds

=== State Champions ===
From 2022–2024, one class

2022-2023 IGHSAU State Wrestling Champions
Weight Class	Wrestler, School
100#	Katie Biscoglia - Raccoon River-Northwest*
105#	Jillian Worthen - Union
110#	Jasmine Luedtke - Ottumwa
115#	Molly Allen - Riverside
120#	Abigail Meyrer - Pleasant Valley
125#	Mackenzie Childers - Prairie, Cedar Rapids
130#	Lilly Luft - Charles City
135#	Maeley Elsbury - South Tama County
140#	Kiara Djoumessi - Waverly-Shell Rock
145#	Emma Peach - Iowa Valley
155#	Skylar Slade - Southeast Polk
170#	Naomi Simon - Decorah
190#	Mackenzie Arends - Nevada
235#	Olivia Huckfelt - Spencer
Team	Waverly-Shell Rock
*Co-op of Waukee Northwest, ADM, Van Meter, and Waukee

2023-2024 IGHSAU State Wrestling Champions
Weight Class	Wrestler, School
100#	Katie Biscoglia - Raccoon River-Northwest*
105#	Layla Phillips - Mason City
110#	Jasmine Luedtke - Ottumwa
115#	Reanah Utterback - Sigourney
120#	Camille Schult - Waverly-Shell Rock
125#	Molly Allen - Riverside
130#	Colbie Tenborg - Saydel
135#	Makana Miller - Waverly-Shell Rock
140#	Kiara Djoumessi - Waverly-Shell Rock
145#	Mahri Manz - Lewis Central
155#	Nicole Olson - Missouri Valley
170#	Naomi Simon - Decorah
190#	Libby Dix - Mount Vernon
235#	Olivia Huckfelt - Spencer
Team	Decorah
*Co-op of Waukee Northwest, ADM, Van Meter, and Waukee

== Defunct sports ==
Three sports were previously overseen by the IGHSAU. These three sports were: gymnastics, synchronized swimming, and indoor track and field.

=== Gymnastics ===
==== Classification guidelines ====
Gymnastics was an IGHSAU sponsored sport from 1968–1988.

==== State Champions ====
From 1968–1988, one class:

Year	Champion
1968	Sioux City, Central
1969	Cedar Rapids, Washington
1970	Cedar Rapids, Washington
1971	Ames & Des Moines, Roosevelt (tie)
1972	Des Moines, Roosevelt
1973	Des Moines, Roosevelt
1974	Des Moines, Roosevelt
1975	Des Moines, Roosevelt
1976	Cedar Rapids, Washington
1977	Cedar Rapids, Washington
1978	Ames
1979	Cedar Rapids, Washington
1980	Clinton
1981	Clinton
1982	Clinton
1983	Linn-Mar
1984	Clinton
1985	Linn-Mar
1986	Linn-Mar
1987	Clinton
1988	Linn-Mar

=== Synchronized Swimming ===
==== Classification guidelines ====
Synchronized Swimming was an IGHSAU sponsored sport from 1970–1981.

==== State Champions ====
From 1970–1981, one class:

Year	Champion
1970	Davenport, West
1971	Davenport, Central
1972	Davenport, Central
1973	Davenport, Central
1974	Davenport, Central
1975	Davenport, Central
1976	Davenport, Central
1977	Davenport, Central
1978	Davenport, Central
1979	Valley, West Des Moines
1980	Valley, West Des Moines
1981	Valley, West Des Moines

=== Indoor Track & Field ===
==== Classification guidelines ====
Indoor Track & Field was an IGHSAU sponsored sport from 1965–1997.

==== State Champions ====
From 1965–1997, one class:

Year	Champion
1965	Belle Plaine
1966	Belle Plaine
1967	Rolfe
1968	Adel
1969	Manilla
1970	B-G-M
1971	Manilla
1972	Collins & Manilla (tie)
1973	Hampton
1974	Collins
1975	Woodbine
1976	Woodbine
1977	Indianola
1978	Tri-County
1979	Indianola
1980	Indianola
1981	Cedar Rapids, Jefferson
1982	Davenport, West
1983	Pleasant Valley
1984	Pleasant Valley
1985	Pleasant Valley
1986	Pleasant Valley
1987	Camanche
1988	Camanche
1989	Ames
1990	Ames
1991	Pleasant Valley
1992	Pleasant Valley
1993	Indianola
1994	Indianola
1995	Cedar Falls & Indianola (tie)
1996	Davenport, North; Prairie, Cedar Rapids; Ankeny (3-way tie)
1997	Pleasant Valley
