= Bangs House =

Bangs House may refer to:

- John and Lavina Bangs House, New London, Iowa
- Algernon Bangs House, Augusta, Maine
- Benjamin Bangs House, Fenton, Michigan

== See also ==
- Jens Bang's House
