= Scott Township, Iowa =

Scott Township, Iowa may refer to one of the following places:

- Scott Township, Buena Vista County, Iowa
- Scott Township, Fayette County, Iowa
- Scott Township, Floyd County, Iowa
- Scott Township, Franklin County, Iowa
- Scott Township, Fremont County, Iowa
- Scott Township, Hamilton County, Iowa, Hamilton County, Iowa
- Scott Township, Henry County, Iowa, Henry County, Iowa
- Scott Township, Johnson County, Iowa
- Scott Township, Madison County, Iowa
- Scott Township, Mahaska County, Iowa, Mahaska County, Iowa
- Scott Township, Montgomery County, Iowa
- Scott Township, Poweshiek County, Iowa, Poweshiek County, Iowa

== See also ==
- Scott Township (disambiguation)
