= John Blackford =

American politician (1837–1916)

Member of the Iowa House of Representatives from the 20th district
- In office January 13, 1913 – January 10, 1915

Personal details
- Born: John W. Blackford; March 4, 1837 York County, Pennsylvania, U.S.
- Died: April 10, 1916 (aged 79) Hillsboro, Iowa, U.S.
- Party: Republican
- Spouse: Nancy Altland (m. 1860)
- Children: 12, including Aaron Vale Blackford
- Occupation: Politician, farmer

John W. Blackford (March 4, 1837 – April 10, 1916) was an American politician and farmer who served in the Iowa House of Representatives from 1913 to 1915, representing Iowa's 20th House of Representatives district as a member of the Republican Party.

Blackford was born near Dillsburg, Pennsylvania, as were his grandfather Joseph and father Aaron, on March 4, 1837. His family had lived in the area since Martin Blackford emigrated from Scotland in 1751. John Blackford's mother was of Dutch descent. He was educated in country schools and the York County Academy. Blackford subsequently taught school, then moved to Van Buren County, Iowa, in 1864. In Iowa, he raised Poland China pigs and Hereford cattle. Blackford served as president of the American Poland China Record Association from 1903 to 1904, and became treasurer of the organization thereafter. From 1906, he lived in Hillsboro, and was president of the Hillsboro Savings Bank. He served one term in the Iowa House of Representatives, as a Republican legislator for District 20, then located in Henry County, from 1913 to 1915. Blackford died on April 10, 1916, in Hillsboro. His son Aaron Vale Blackford later served in both houses of the Iowa General Assembly.
