= Lowell, Iowa =

- Census-designated place
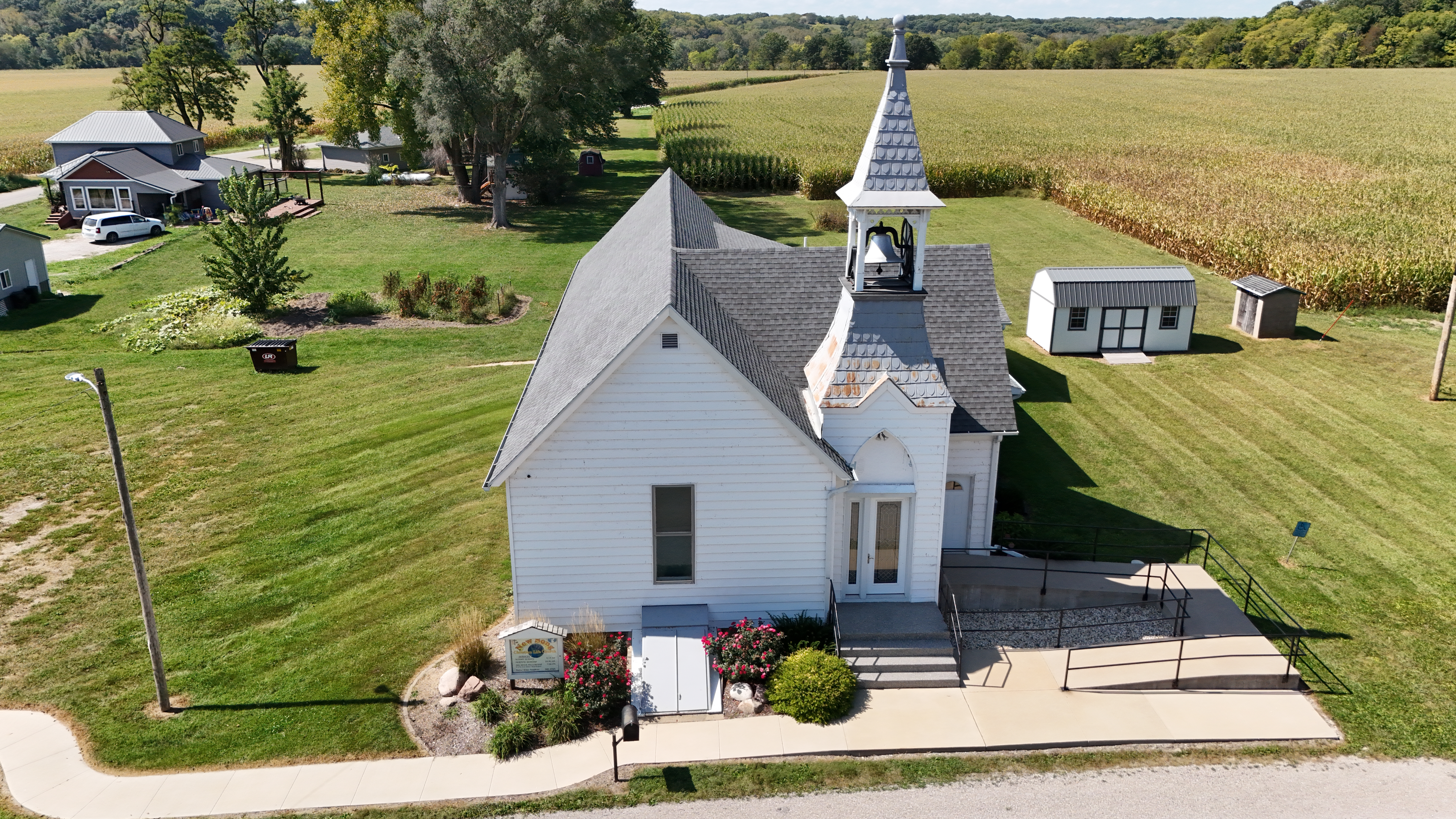
- New Song Church in Lowell

- Location within Iowa Location within the United States
- Coordinates: 40°50′04″N 91°26′19″W
- Country: United States
- State: Iowa
- County: Henry

Area
  - Total: 1.00 sq mi (2.59 km^{2})
  - Land: 1.00 sq mi (2.59 km^{2})
  - Water: 0 sq mi (0.00 km^{2})
- Elevation: 676 ft (206 m)

Population (2020)
  - Total: 70
  - Density: 70.1/sq mi (27.07/km^{2})
- Time zone: UTC-6 (Central (CST))
  - Summer (DST): UTC-5 (CDT)
- ZIP codes: 52645
- FIPS code: 19-46965
- GNIS feature ID: 2804131

Lowell is an unincorporated community and census-designated place (CDP) in southeastern Henry County, Iowa, United States. It was first listed as a CDP prior to the 2020 census. As of the 2020 census, Lowell had a population of 70.

== Location ==
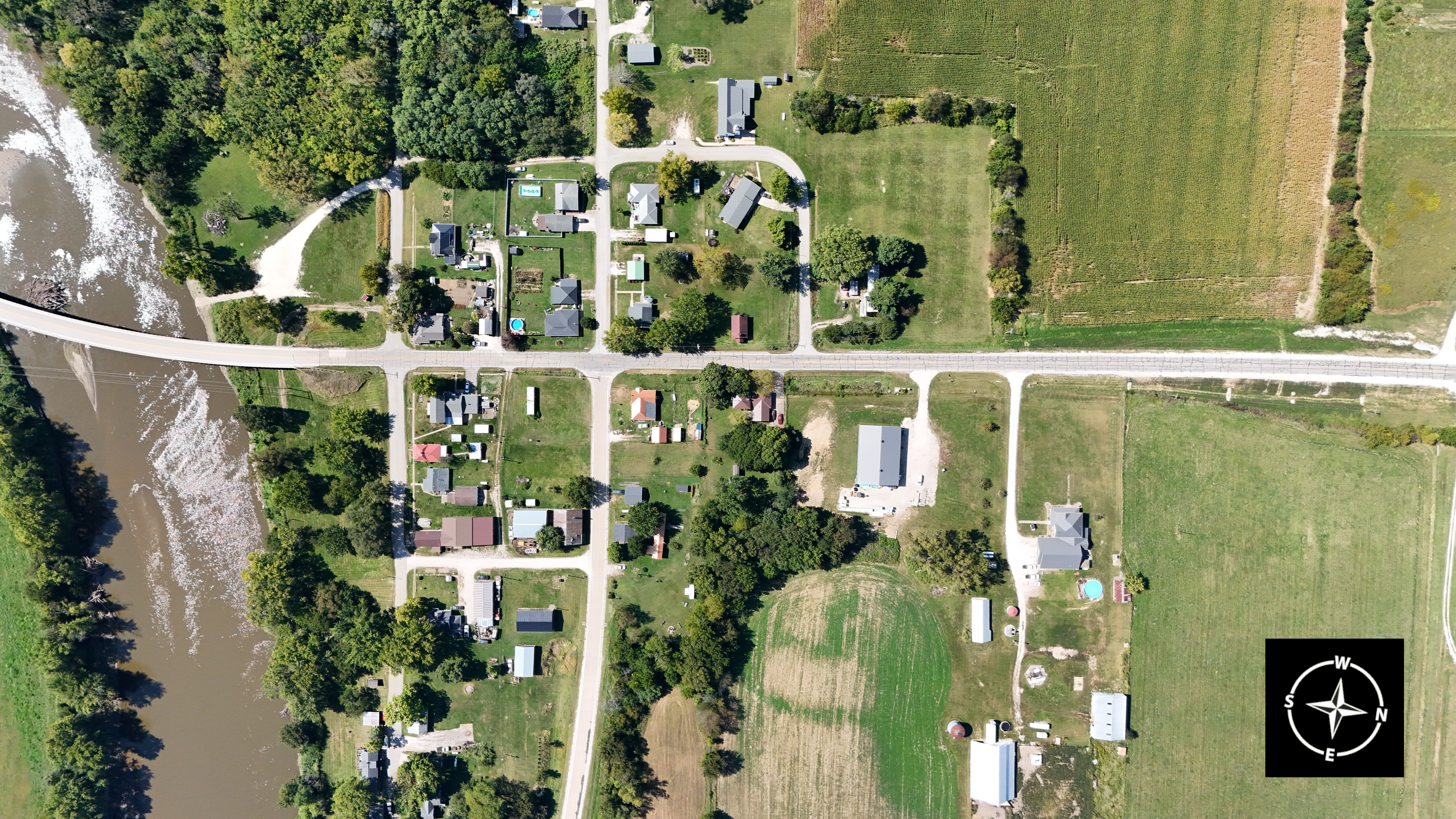
An aerial photo of Lowell, taken on September 17, 2024

The community is located in Baltimore Township, along the Skunk River. Lowell is at the intersection of New London and Salem Roads, south of New London. Lowell is at an elevation of 584 feet (178 m).

== History ==
The village was laid out by a man named McCarver. At one time, Lowell had Presbyterian and Methodist congregations, two fraternal lodges, two gristmills, and five sawmills. The relatively large number of sawmills was due to Baltimore Township being two-thirds timber. The first mill in town was established by Major Smith and Thomas Angel in 1838.

Lowell's population in 1915 was 105. The population was 56 in 1940.

== Demographics ==
Historical population
Census	Pop.	Note	%±
2020	70		—
U.S. Decennial Census

=== 2020 census ===
As of the census of 2020, there were 70 people, 30 households, and 18 families residing in the community. The population density was 70.1 inhabitants per square mile (27.1/km^{2}). There were 33 housing units at an average density of 33.1 per square mile (12.8/km^{2}). The racial makeup of the community was 90.0% White, 0.0% Black or African American, 0.0% Native American, 0.0% Asian, 1.4% Pacific Islander, 1.4% from other races and 7.1% from two or more races. Hispanic or Latino persons of any race comprised 2.9% of the population.

Of the 30 households, 26.7% of which had children under the age of 18 living with them, 56.7% were married couples living together, 0.0% were cohabitating couples, 13.3% had a female householder with no spouse or partner present and 30.0% had a male householder with no spouse or partner present. 40.0% of all households were non-families. 40.0% of all households were made up of individuals, 26.7% had someone living alone who was 65 years old or older.

The median age in the community was 53.0 years. 30.0% of the residents were under the age of 20; 1.4% were between the ages of 20 and 24; 10.0% were from 25 and 44; 31.4% were from 45 and 64; and 27.1% were 65 years of age or older. The gender makeup of the community was 52.9% male and 47.1% female.
