= Trenton, Iowa =

- Census-designated place
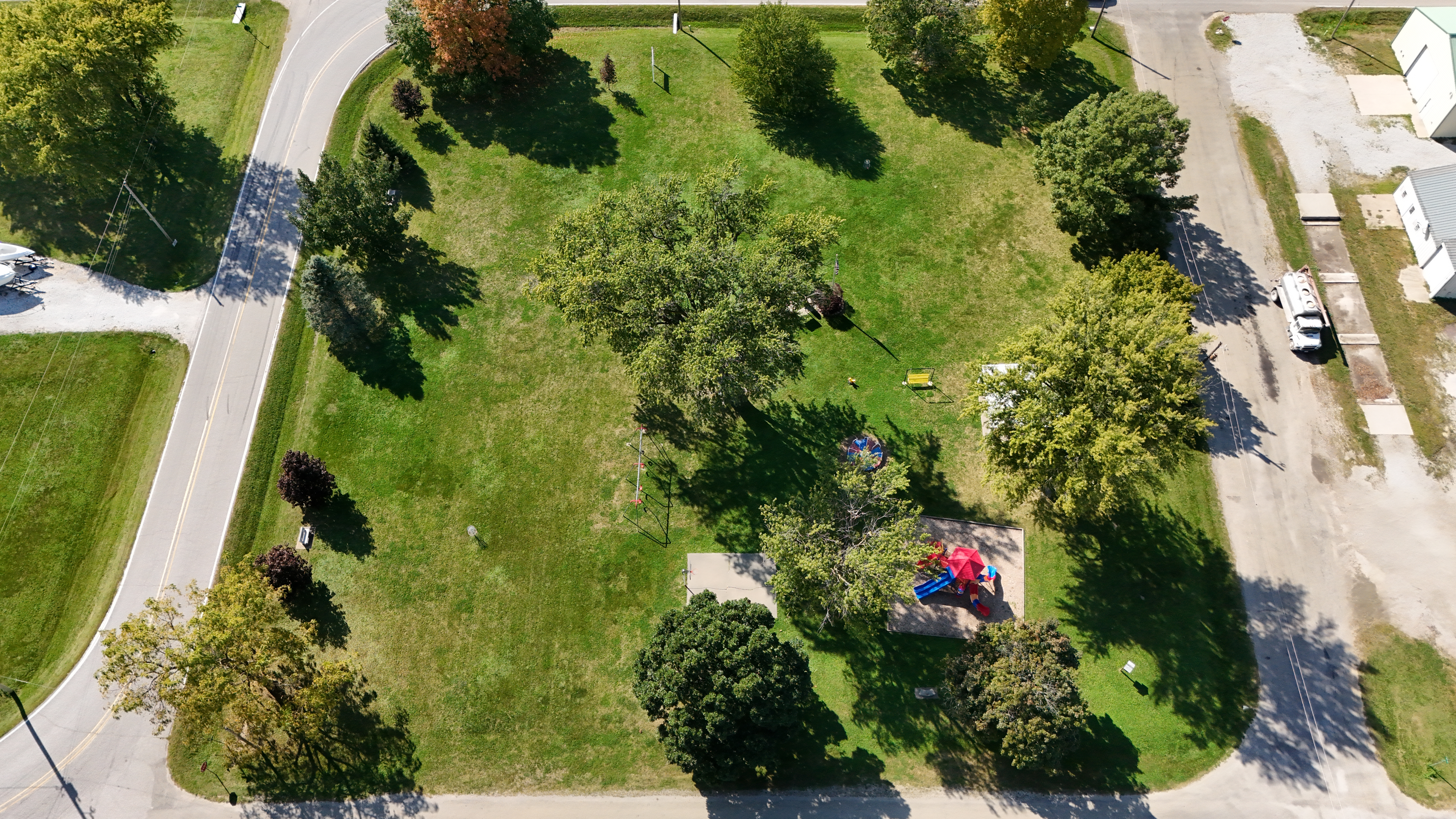
- Trenton Park

- Location within Iowa Location within the United States
- Coordinates: 41°3′44″N 91°38′19″W
- Country: United States
- State: Iowa
- County: Henry
- Township: Trenton

Area
  - Total: 0.46 sq mi (1.19 km^{2})
  - Land: 0.46 sq mi (1.19 km^{2})
  - Water: 0 sq mi (0.00 km^{2})
- Elevation: 733 ft (223 m)

Population (2020)
  - Total: 74
  - Density: 160.5/sq mi (61.97/km^{2})
- Time zone: UTC-6 (Central (CST))
  - Summer (DST): UTC-5 (CDT)
- ZIP Code: 52641 (Mount Pleasant)
- Area code: 319
- FIPS code: 19-78780
- GNIS feature ID: 2804141

Trenton is an unincorporated community and census-designated place (CDP) in Henry County, Iowa, United States. It is in the northwest part of the county, 10 miles (16 km) northwest of Mount Pleasant, the county seat. As of the 2020 census, Trenton had a population of 74.

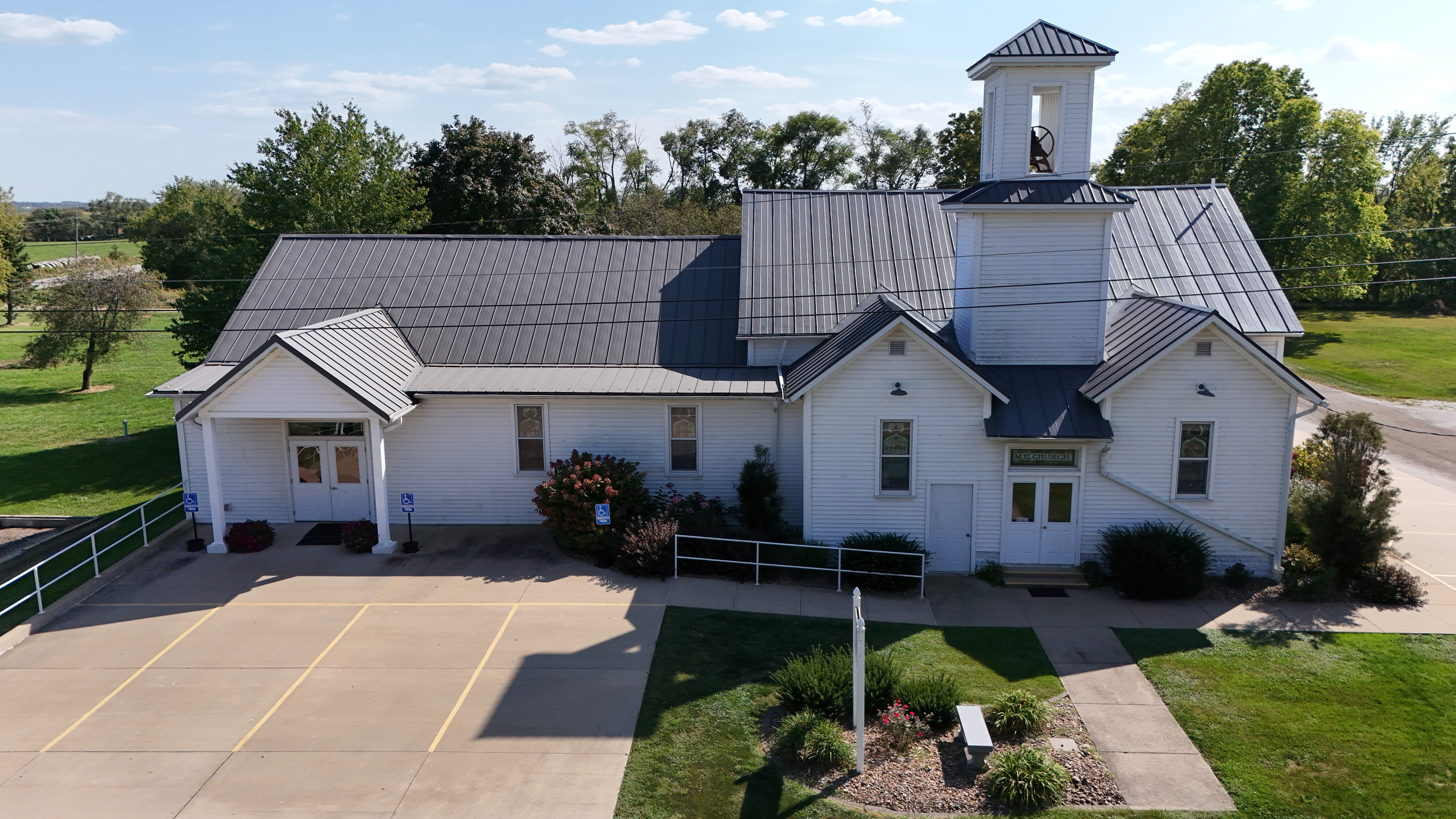
United Methodist Church in Trenton

Trenton was first listed as a CDP prior to the 2020 census.

== Demographics ==
Historical population
| Census | Pop. | Note | %± |
|---|---|---|---|
| 2020 | 74 | | — |
U.S. Decennial Census

=== 2020 census ===
As of the census of 2020, there were 74 people, 36 households, and 25 families residing in the community. The population density was 160.5 inhabitants per square mile (62.0/km^{2}). There were 36 housing units at an average density of 78.1 per square mile (30.1/km^{2}). The racial makeup of the community was 97.3% White, 0.0% Black or African American, 0.0% Native American, 0.0% Asian, 0.0% Pacific Islander, 1.4% from other races and 1.4% from two or more races. Hispanic or Latino persons of any race comprised 0.0% of the population.

Of the 36 households, 25.0% of which had children under the age of 18 living with them, 55.6% were married couples living together, 5.6% were cohabitating couples, 25.0% had a female householder with no spouse or partner present and 13.9% had a male householder with no spouse or partner present. 30.6% of all households were non-families. 27.8% of all households were made up of individuals, 8.3% had someone living alone who was 65 years old or older.

The median age in the community was 44.7 years. 20.3% of the residents were under the age of 20; 1.4% were between the ages of 20 and 24; 29.7% were from 25 and 44; 36.5% were from 45 and 64; and 12.2% were 65 years of age or older. The gender makeup of the community was 48.6% male and 51.4% female.

== History ==
Trenton's population was 80 in 1925.

== Education ==
It is in the Mount Pleasant Community School District. Mount Pleasant Community High School is the comprehensive high school of the district.
