= Aaron Vale Blackford =

American politician (1871–1948)

Member of the Iowa Senate from the 2nd district
- In office January 14, 1929 – January 8, 1933

Member of the Iowa House of Representatives from the 2nd district
- In office January 12, 1925 – January 13, 1929

Personal details
- Born: December 18, 1871 near Hillsboro, Iowa, U.S.
- Died: August 31, 1948 (aged 76) Bonaparte, Iowa, U.S.
- Party: Republican
- Spouse: Katherine Alice Lundgren (m. 1925)
- Children: 1
- Parent: John Blackford (father)
- Education: Iowa Wesleyan College (BA)
- Occupation: Politician, businessman

Aaron Vale Blackford (December 18, 1871 – August 31, 1948) was an American politician from Iowa.

== Life ==
Aaron Vale Blackford was born to John Blackford and his wife, the former Nancy Atland on December 18, 1871. He graduated from Iowa Wesleyan College in 1897, became a teacher for two years, and then went into business with his brother, selling farming equipment and cars in Bonaparte. Blackford was also a farmer and vice president of the Bonaparte State Bank.

A thirty-second degree Freemason associated with the Order of the Eastern Star and Knights Templar, Blackford was politically active as well. He served as a school board member in Bonaparte for two decades. Subsequently, he was elected to the first of two terms in the Iowa House of Representatives in 1926. He represented District 2 as a Republican legislator. He won election to the Iowa Senate in 1928 and held the Senate's 2nd district seat until 1933. He died on August 31, 1948, in Bonaparte.
