= Oakland Mills, Iowa =

- Unincorporated community
- Location within Iowa Location within the United States
- Coordinates: 40.9361397°N 91.6165510°W
- Country: United States
- State: Iowa
- County: Henry
- Elevation: 568 ft (173 m)
- Time zone: UTC-6 (Central (CST))
  - Summer (DST): UTC-5 (CDT)
- Area code: 319
- GNIS feature ID: 459769

Oakland Mills is an unincorporated community in Henry County, Iowa, United States. The community is located along the Skunk River at the intersection of county highways W55 and H46, 3.8 miles (6.1 km) west-southwest of downtown Mount Pleasant.

== History ==
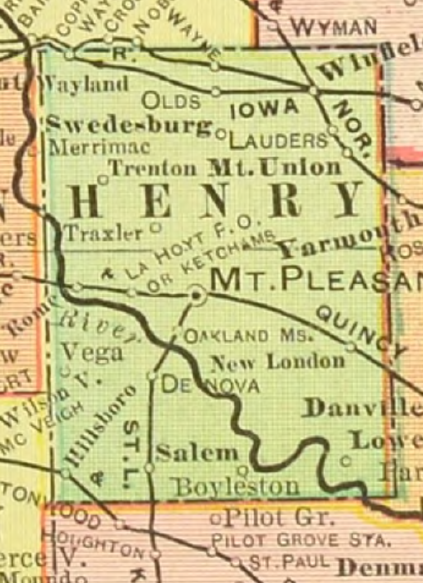
Oakland Mills in Henry County, Iowa, in 1902

Oakland Mills was once home to a school, a church, a railroad station, and a hotel, along with the two mills that gave it its name. It is now the site of Oakland Mills Park, a state-owned and county-maintained park that includes a nature center and campgrounds.

Oakland Mills' population was estimated as 100 in 1940.

In the 1970s, its population was estimated at 30 to 35 people.
