= Mount Pleasant Community School District =

Public school district in Mount Pleasant, Iowa, United States

Coordinates: 40.963329°N 91.538214°W

Location
- Mount Pleasant, Iowa Henry County United States
- Coordinates: 40.963329, -91.538214

District information
- Type: Local school district
- Grades: K-12
- Superintendent: Sharon Dentlinger
- Schools: 7 (6 after Salem Elementary closes)
- Budget: $29,188,000 (2020-21)
- NCES District ID: 1919890

Students and staff
- Students: 1852 (2022-23)
- Teachers: 144.30 FTE
- Staff: 164.32 FTE
- Student–teacher ratio: 12.83
- Athletic conference: Southeast
- District mascot: Panthers
- Colors: Maroon and Gold

Other information
- Website: www.mtpcsd.org

The Mount Pleasant Community School District is a public school district headquartered in Mount Pleasant, Iowa. The district is mainly in Henry County, but has small areas in Jefferson, Lee, and Van Buren counties. The district includes the city of Mount Pleasant and the surrounding area, which has the municipalities of Rome, Salem, and Westwood, and the census-designated place of Trenton, along with rural area students.

In January 2024, the Mount Pleasant Community School District finalized its acquisition of the 13-acre "Central Campus" from the former Iowa Wesleyan University. The acquisition included the Howe Student Activity Center, Ruble Arena, the John Wesley Holland Student Union, the University Chapel, Old Main, Pioneer Hall, and the P.E.O. Memorial Building. The purchase became the cornerstone of a long-term facilities master plan designed to address a significant budget deficit and declining enrollment by consolidating the district's elementary attendance centers from four buildings to two.

A central and controversial component of the plan involved the closure of neighborhood and rural schools. On April 27, 2026, the school board voted 4–3 to close Salem Elementary School—the district’s final rural attendance center—effective at the conclusion of the 2026–2027 school year. The vote divided board members, with President Angie Blint and members Josh Maher, Mike Hampton, and Aaron Williamson voting in favor, while Mark Overberg, Craig Hurd, and Kevin Schrader voted in opposition.

The closure of Salem Elementary is projected to save approximately $523,000 annually as part of a broader $1.8 million budget reduction plan. Beyond rural consolidation, the master plan outlines the eventual closure of Lincoln and Harlan elementary schools, with students to be centralized at a redeveloped campus on the former university site and an expanded Van Allen Elementary.

As part of the redevelopment, the district approved a $238,125 contract in late 2025 to demolish the historic P.E.O. Memorial Building after determining that the estimated $2 million required for safety and accessibility renovations was prohibitive. The site is expected to be converted into parking to support increased use of the Central Campus facilities.

== Schools ==
The district has seven schools. all located in Mount Pleasant:

- Lincoln Elementary
- Harlan Elementary
- Van Allen Elementary
- Salem Elementary
- Mount Pleasant Community Middle School
- Mount Pleasant Community High School
- WisdomQuest Education Center

The MPCSD also provides the educational component for the Christamore House, a court-appointed juvenile facility located in Mount Pleasant.

== Other facilities ==
The district uses the Cottrell Gymnasium. In 2018 it was renovated for $150,000.

The Iowa Wesleyan facilities on the main campus that the district sought to acquire were: Old Main, the school's chapel, John Wesley Holland Student Union, Howe Student Activity Center, the PEO Memorial Building, Pioneer Hall, and the Ruble Arena. The district also sought the Iowa Wesleyan practice fields.

== See also ==
- List of school districts in Iowa
