= Rome, Iowa =

- Village
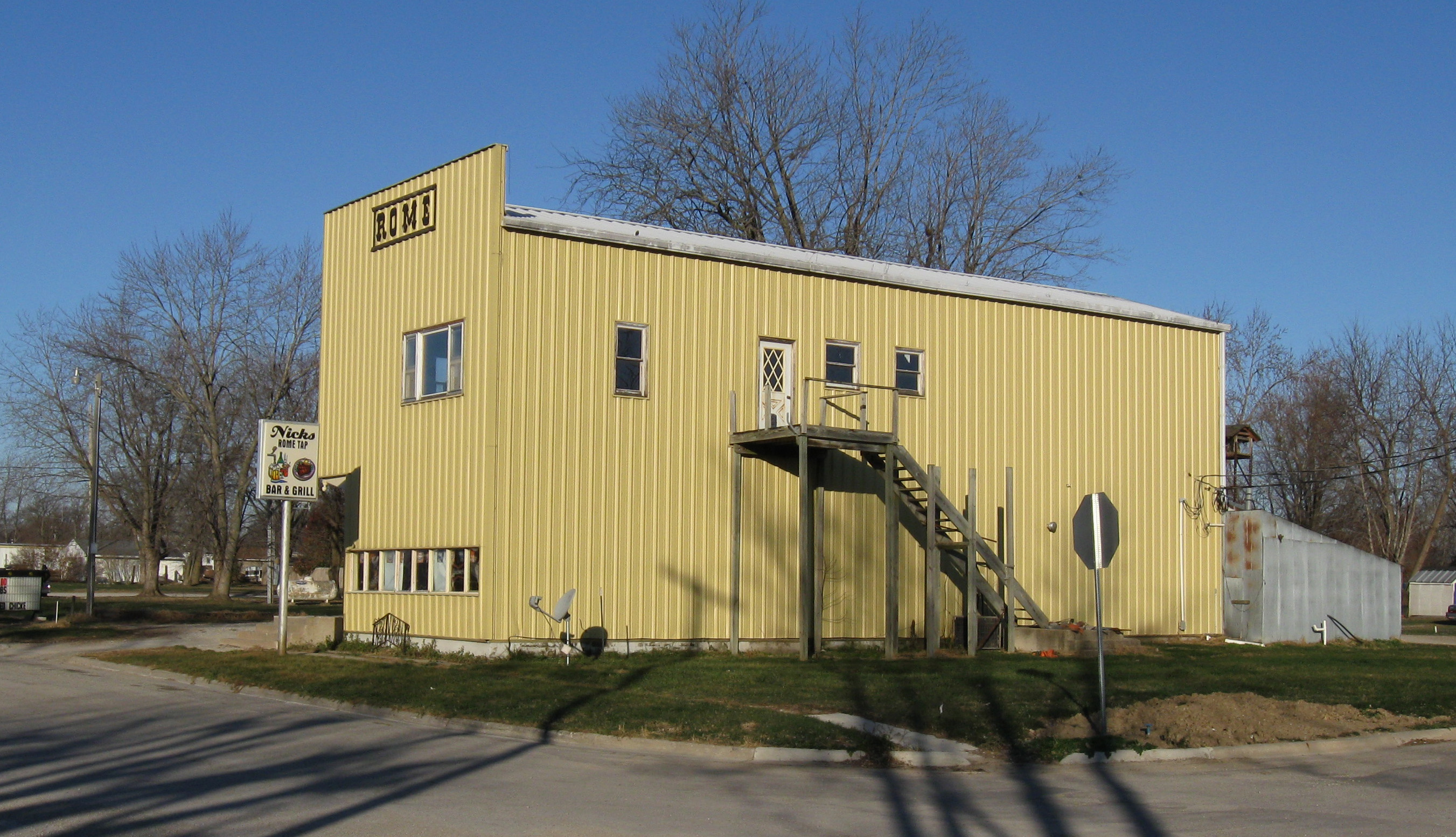
- A Building in Rome, Iowa

- Location of Rome, Iowa
- Coordinates: 40°58′55″N 91°40′54″W
- Country: United States
- State: Iowa
- County: Henry

Area
  - Total: 0.12 sq mi (0.32 km^{2})
  - Land: 0.12 sq mi (0.32 km^{2})
  - Water: 0 sq mi (0.00 km^{2})
- Elevation: 584 ft (178 m)

Population (2020)
  - Total: 114
  - Density: 916.2/sq mi (353.75/km^{2})
- Time zone: UTC-6 (Central (CST))
  - Summer (DST): UTC-5 (CDT)
- ZIP code: 52642
- Area code: 319
- FIPS code: 19-68565
- GNIS feature ID: 2396422

Rome is a village in Henry County, Iowa, United States. The population was 114 at the time of the 2020 census.

== History ==
Rome was first laid out in 1846 by William Scott. In 1866, Rome annexed land across the Skunk River, in order to be connected to the Chicago, Burlington and Quincy Railroad.

== Geography ==
According to the United States Census Bureau, the village has a total area of 0.13 square miles (0.34 km^{2}), all land. The village is situated on the northwest bank of the Skunk River.

== Demographics ==
Historical populations
Year	Pop.	±%
1880	276	—
1890	261	−5.4%
1900	255	−2.3%
1910	155	−39.2%
1920	168	+8.4%
1930	144	−14.3%
1940	119	−17.4%
1950	134	+12.6%
1960	117	−12.7%
1970	135	+15.4%
1980	113	−16.3%
1990	124	+9.7%
2000	113	−8.9%
2010	117	+3.5%
2020	114	−2.6%
Source:"U.S. Census website". United States Census Bureau. and Iowa Data Center; Source: U.S. Decennial Census

=== 2020 census ===
As of the census of 2020, there were 114 people, 44 households, and 34 families residing in the city. The population density was 916.2 inhabitants per square mile (353.7/km^{2}). There were 48 housing units at an average density of 385.8 per square mile (148.9/km^{2}). The racial makeup of the city was 98.2% White, 0.0% Black or African American, 0.9% Native American, 0.0% Asian, 0.0% Pacific Islander, 0.0% from other races and 0.9% from two or more races. Hispanic or Latino persons of any race comprised 0.9% of the population.

Of the 44 households, 43.2% of which had children under the age of 18 living with them, 45.5% were married couples living together, 9.1% were cohabitating couples, 27.3% had a female householder with no spouse or partner present and 18.2% had a male householder with no spouse or partner present. 22.7% of all households were non-families. 6.8% of all households were made up of individuals, 4.5% had someone living alone who was 65 years old or older.

The median age in the city was 35.4 years. 34.2% of the residents were under the age of 20; 2.6% were between the ages of 20 and 24; 28.9% were from 25 and 44; 23.7% were from 45 and 64; and 10.5% were 65 years of age or older. The gender makeup of the city was 48.2% male and 51.8% female.

=== 2010 census ===
At the 2010 census, there were 117 people, 52 households and 26 families living in the village. The population density was 900.0 inhabitants per square mile (347.5/km^{2}). There were 54 housing units at an average density of 415.4 per square mile (160.4/km^{2}). The racial makeup of the village was 97.4% White and 2.6% from other races. Hispanic or Latino of any race were 6.0% of the population.

There were 52 households, of which 23.1% had children under the age of 18 living with them, 34.6% were married couples living together, 5.8% had a female householder with no husband present, 9.6% had a male householder with no wife present, and 50.0% were non-families. 36.5% of all households were made up of individuals, and 13.4% had someone living alone who was 65 years of age or older. The average household size was 2.25 and the average family size was 3.00.

The median age in the village was 42.8 years. 17.1% of residents were under the age of 18; 15.4% were between the ages of 18 and 24; 19.7% were from 25 to 44; 33.4% were from 45 to 64; and 14.5% were 65 years of age or older. The gender makeup of the village was 50.4% male and 49.6% female.

=== 2000 census ===
At the 2000 census, there were 113 people, 49 households and 27 families living in the village. The population density was 870.5 inhabitants per square mile (336.1/km^{2}). There were 55 housing units at an average density of 423.7 per square mile (163.6/km^{2}). The racial makeup of the village was 99.12% White, and 0.88% Native American.

There were 49 households, of which 26.5% had children under the age of 18 living with them, 38.8% were married couples living together, 14.3% had a female householder with no husband present, and 42.9% were non-families. 30.6% of all households were made up of individuals, and 4.1% had someone living alone who was 65 years of age or older. The average household size was 2.31 and the average family size was 2.82.

24.8% of the population were under the age of 18, 8.0% from 18 to 24, 34.5% from 25 to 44, 27.4% from 45 to 64, and 5.3% who were 65 years of age or older. The median age was 35 years. For every 100 females, there were 76.6 males. For every 100 females age 18 and over, there were 102.4 males.

The median household income was $22,083 and the median family income was $40,000. Males had a median income of $26,250 compared with $15,625 for females. The per capita income for the village was $12,976. There were 10.0% of families and 27.0% of the population living below the poverty line, including 18.2% of under eighteens and 50.0% of those over 64.

== Education ==
The Mount Pleasant Community School District operates local area public schools. Mount Pleasant Community High School is the designated comprehensive high school.
