= Leonard Wester =

American football player (born 1993)

No. 66, 61
- Position: Offensive tackle

Personal information
- Born: January 3, 1993 (age 33); Mount Pleasant, Iowa, U.S.
- Listed height: 6 ft 6 in (1.98 m)
- Listed weight: 305 lb (138 kg)

Career information
- High school: Mount Pleasant Community
- College: Missouri Western
- NFL draft: 2016: undrafted

Career history
- Tampa Bay Buccaneers (2016–2018); Jacksonville Jaguars (2019)*; San Francisco 49ers (2020)*
- * Offseason or practice squad member only

Career NFL statistics
- Games played: 27
- Games started: 1
- Receptions: 1
- Receiving yards: 2
- Receiving touchdowns: 1
- Stats at Pro Football Reference

Leonard Wester (born January 3, 1993) is an American former professional football player who was an offensive tackle in the National Football League (NFL). He played Division II college football for the Missouri Western State Griffons.

== Professional career ==
Pre-draft measurables
Height	Weight	40-yard dash	10-yard split	20-yard split	20-yard shuttle	Three-cone drill	Vertical jump	Broad jump	Bench press
6 ft 5 in (1.96 m)	307 lb (139 kg)	5.17 s	1.81 s	3.04 s	4.73 s	7.92 s	29 in (0.74 m)	9 ft 0 in (2.74 m)	20 reps
All values from Pro Day

=== Tampa Bay Buccaneers ===
On April 30, 2016, Wester signed with the Tampa Bay Buccaneers after going undrafted in the 2016 NFL draft.

=== Jacksonville Jaguars ===
On April 4, 2019, Wester signed with the Jacksonville Jaguars. He was waived/injured during final roster cuts on August 31, 2019 and reverted to the team's injured reserve list the next day. He was waived from injured reserve with an injury settlement on September 6.

=== San Francisco 49ers ===
On January 14, 2020, Wester signed a reserve/future contract with the San Francisco 49ers. He was released on July 30, 2020.
