= Jefferson Township, Henry County, Iowa =

Township in Henry County, Iowa, U.S.

Coordinates: 41°07′N 91°40′W

Jefferson Township is a township in Henry County, Iowa, USA.
