= Wayne Township, Henry County, Iowa =

Township in Henry County, Iowa, U.S.

Coordinates: 41°07′N 91°33′W

Wayne Township is a township in Henry County, Iowa, United States.
