= Marion Township, Henry County, Iowa =

Township in Henry County, Iowa, U.S.

Coordinates: 41°02′N 91°33′W

Marion Township is a township in Henry County, Iowa, USA.
