= Canaan Township, Henry County, Iowa =

Township in Henry County, Iowa, U.S.

Coordinates: 41°02′N 91°26′W

Canaan Township is a township in Henry County, Iowa, United States.
