= Smith and Weller Building =

- Formerly listed on the U.S. National Register of Historic Places
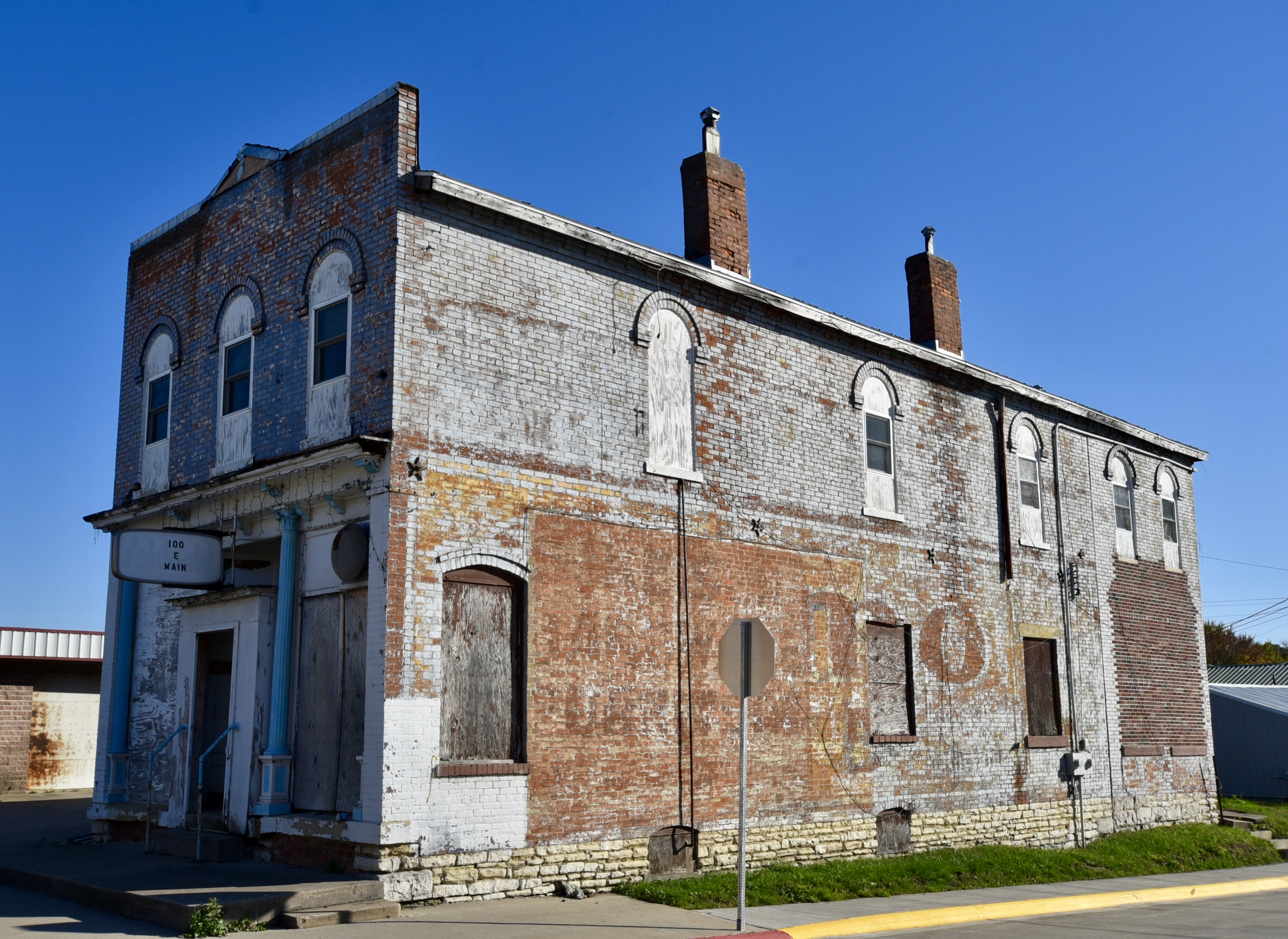

- Location within Iowa Location within the United States
- Location: 100 E. Main; New London, Iowa
- Coordinates: 40°55′38″N 91°24′05″W
- Area: less than one acre
- Built: c. 1875
- Architectural style: Italianate
- NRHP reference No.: 03000830

Significant dates
- Added to NRHP: August 28, 2003
- Removed from NRHP: July 31, 2020

The Smith and Weller Building, also known as the Knights of Pythias Hall, was a historic building in New London, Iowa, United States. Charles W. Smith and C.B. Weller bought the lot on which the building sat for $300 in 1872. The building itself was built sometime before 1879 when Smith and Weller sold the lot to Sam Keiser and W.S. Workman for $2,500. The structure was designed in the Italianate style and featured simple brick-patterned arches. Keiser and his wife owned the building until 1907, when they sold it to the Knights of Pythias for their lodge. A hardware store occupied the main floor, and the lodge was on the second floor. The Knights of Pythias sold the building in 1946 to Otis and Mae Maginnis. The building housed a bar in the intervening years. It was listed on the National Register of Historic Places in 2003, and it was delisted in 2020. The building was demolished in 2020.
