= Mount Pleasant Community High School =

Public secondary school in Mount Pleasant, Iowa, United States

Location
- 2104 S Grand Ave; Mount Pleasant, Iowa; United States

Information
- Type: Public high school
- Established: June 20, 2000
- School district: Mount Pleasant Community School District
- Superintendent: Sharon Dentlinger
- Principal: Dalton Stone
- Staff: 40.98 (FTE)
- Grades: 9–12
- Enrollment: 545 (2024–25)
- Student to teacher ratio: 13.30
- Colors: Maroon and gold
- Athletics conference: Southeast Conference (3A)
- Nickname: Panthers
- Rival: Fairfield Trojans
- Newspaper: Maroon Echoes
- Website: mtpcsd.org/schools/high-school/

Mount Pleasant Community High School is a public high school located in Iowa. The Mount Pleasant Community School District replaced the high school building to the Grand Ave. location from the previous location at Monroe Street around 2000.

Communities within the district include Mount Pleasant, Rome, Salem, and Westwood, as well as the census-designated place of Trenton.

Annual enrollments are generally between 500 and 700 students. The school offers regular and enriched academic education which includes advanced placement classes, special education classes, vocational education, and specialized instruction for at-risk students as well as those with limited English-speaking capabilities.

== Athletics ==
The high school is part of the 3A Southeast Conference and participates in 18 varsity athletics, including track and field, cross country, basketball, football, wrestling, volleyball, soccer, tennis, golf, and bowling.

=== State championships ===
MPCHS holds at least eight state championships, three in boys basketball (1917, 1918, 2012), one in boys outdoor track & field (2000), girls cross country (2002) and three in girls track & field (2004, 2005, 2006). The football team was also voted state champions (for all classes) in 1963 (before there was a playoff system) as they were undefeated and unscored on.

== Activities ==
The school's music program allows students to participate in choir, show choir, concert band, marching band, and jazz band.

Since 1986, the Mount Pleasant Panther Marching Band has accumulated an impressive streak of consecutive Division I ratings at the annual State Marching Band Festival.

The Mount Pleasant Community High School currently has two jazz bands numbered 1-2. Group # 1 has qualified numerous times for the State Jazz Championships over the years. However, # 2 is underclassman, therefore still polishing these skills needed for Jazz 1.

The Mount Pleasant InMotion show choir is an ensemble directed by Makenzie Kauffman-Ho, a employee of MTPCSD. The school hosts their own "Music in Motion"- a show choir invitational held annually in early February.

== Notable alumni ==
- Dana Holgorsen, interim offensive coordinator for the Nebraska Cornhuskers, former head football coach for the West Virginia Mountaineers and Houston Cougars
- Henry Krieger-Coble, former collegiate football player for the Iowa Hawkeyes and NFL tight end
- James Van Allen, physicist that discovered the Van Allen Radiation Belts
- Leonard Wester, former NFL player

== See also ==
- List of school districts in Iowa
- List of high schools in Iowa
