= Henry Krieger-Coble =

American football player (born 1992)

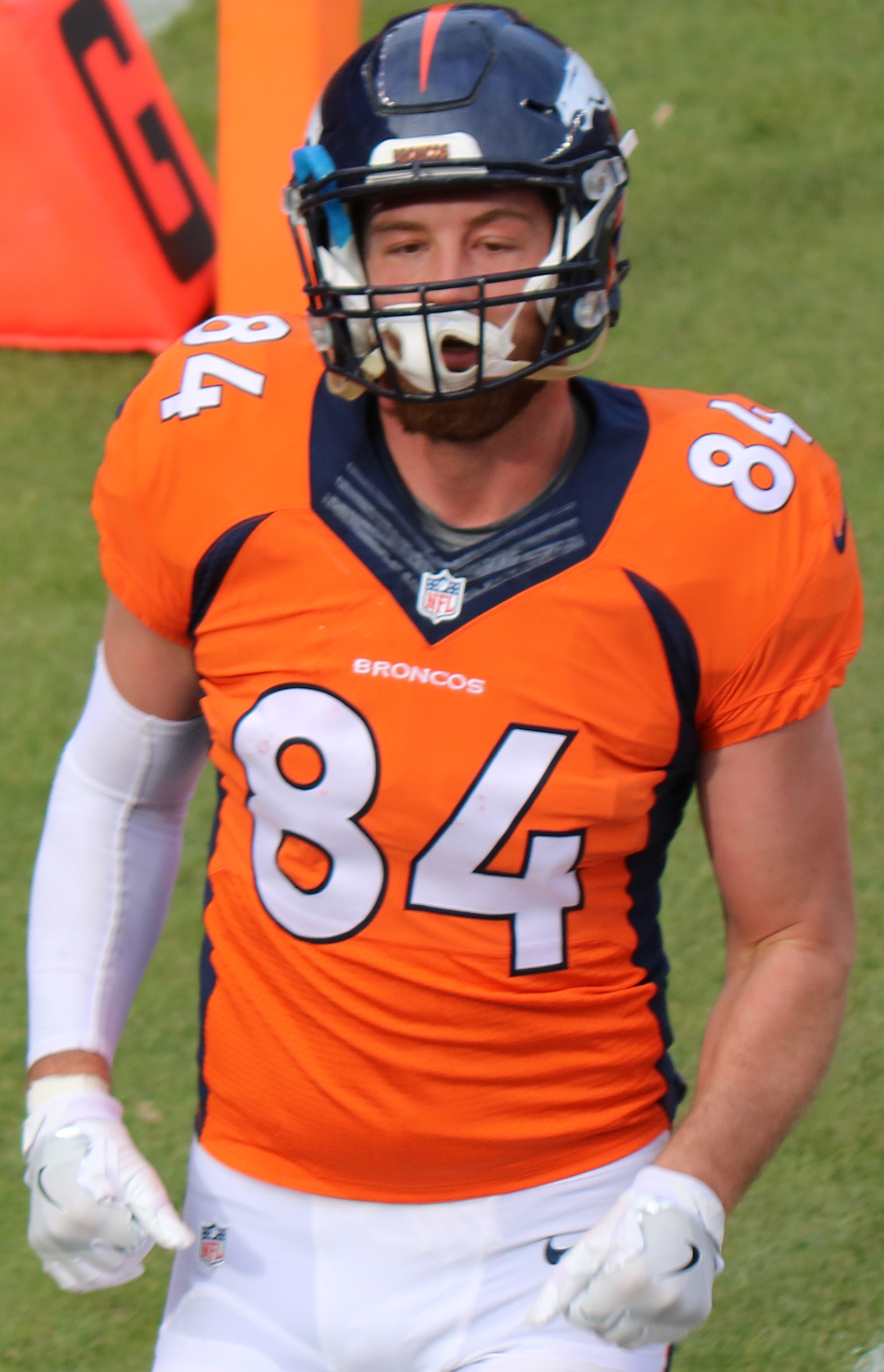
- Krieger-Coble with the Denver Broncos in 2016

No. 84, 81, 87
- Position: Tight end

Personal information
- Born: June 12, 1992 (age 34); Mount Pleasant, Iowa, U.S.
- Listed height: 6 ft 4 in (1.93 m)
- Listed weight: 246 lb (112 kg)

Career information
- High school: Mount Pleasant Community
- College: Iowa
- NFL draft: 2016: undrafted

Career history
- Denver Broncos (2016); Indianapolis Colts (2017); Los Angeles Rams (2017–2018)*
- * Offseason or practice squad member only

Career NFL statistics
- Receptions: 1
- Receiving yards: 13
- Stats at Pro Football Reference

Henry Krieger-Coble (born June 12, 1992) is an American former professional football player who was a tight end in the National Football League (NFL). He played college football for the Iowa Hawkeyes. His cousin is San Francisco 49ers tight end George Kittle.

== Professional career ==
=== Denver Broncos ===
Krieger-Coble was signed by the Denver Broncos as an undrafted free agent on May 3, 2016. On September 3, 2016, he was waived by the Broncos and was signed to the practice squad the next day. He was promoted to the active roster on December 23, 2016.

On July 29, 2017, Krieger-Coble was waived by the Broncos.

=== Indianapolis Colts ===
On July 30, 2017, Krieger-Coble was claimed off waivers by the Indianapolis Colts. He was waived on September 2, 2017, and was signed to the Colts' practice squad the next day. He was released on September 26, 2017. He was re-signed to the active roster on October 6, 2017. He was once again waived by the Colts on October 27, 2017.

=== Los Angeles Rams ===
On December 27, 2017, Krieger-Coble was signed to the Los Angeles Rams' practice squad. He signed a reserve/future contract with the Rams on January 8, 2018.

On September 1, 2018, Krieger-Coble was waived by the Rams and was signed to the practice squad the next day.
