= Peterson Manufacturing Building =

- U.S. National Register of Historic Places
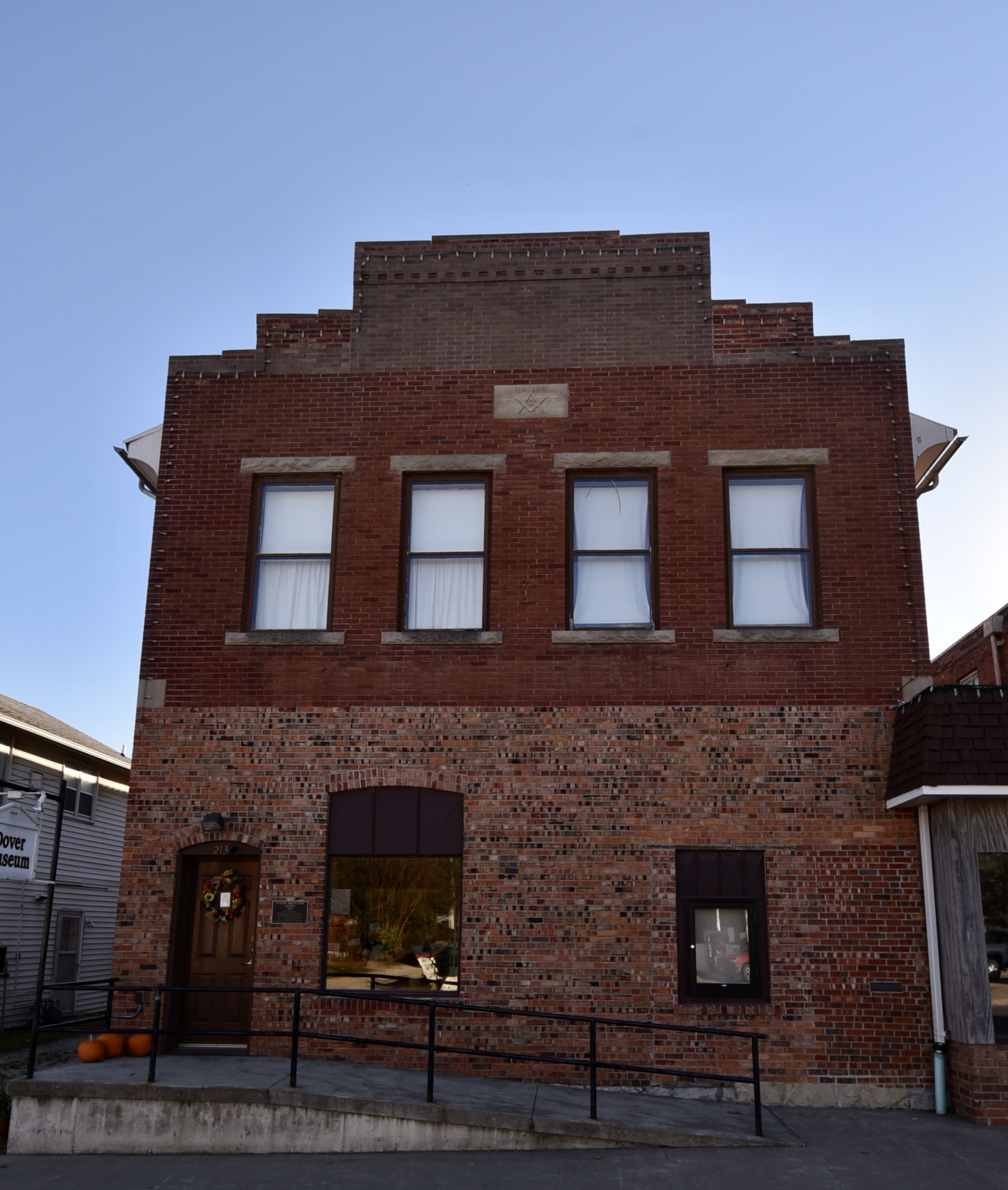

- Location within Iowa Location within the United States
- Location: 213 W. Main St. New London, Iowa
- Coordinates: 40°55′32.4″N 91°24′13.7″W
- Area: less than one acre
- Built: 1908-1909
- NRHP reference No.: 97000962
- Added to NRHP: August 29, 1997

The Peterson Manufacturing Building, also known as the New London Cooperative Creamery, is a historic building located in New London, Iowa, United States. The first floor of this building was constructed in 1908 by John Edgar Peterson so he could expand his glove and mitten factory. Peterson was also instrumental in the establishing the First National Bank in New London and served as its president, the Henry County Telephone Company, the New London Improvement Company, and the New London Land Company. The second floor of this building was completed in 1909 by the local Masonic lodge. Peterson died in 1917 and glove and mitten factory closed briefly before it was reopened by the Fairfield Glove and Mitten Factory. In 1928 that factory closed and the building housed a creamery until 1968. After being used as a warehouse it was donated to the Dover Historical Society for a historical museum. The building was listed on the National Register of Historic Places in 1997.
