= Salem Township, Henry County, Iowa =

Township in Henry County, Iowa, U.S.

Coordinates: 40°51′N 91°40′W

Salem Township is a township in Henry County, Iowa, USA.
