= Benjamin Bangs House =

Historic house in Michigan

- U.S. National Register of Historic Places
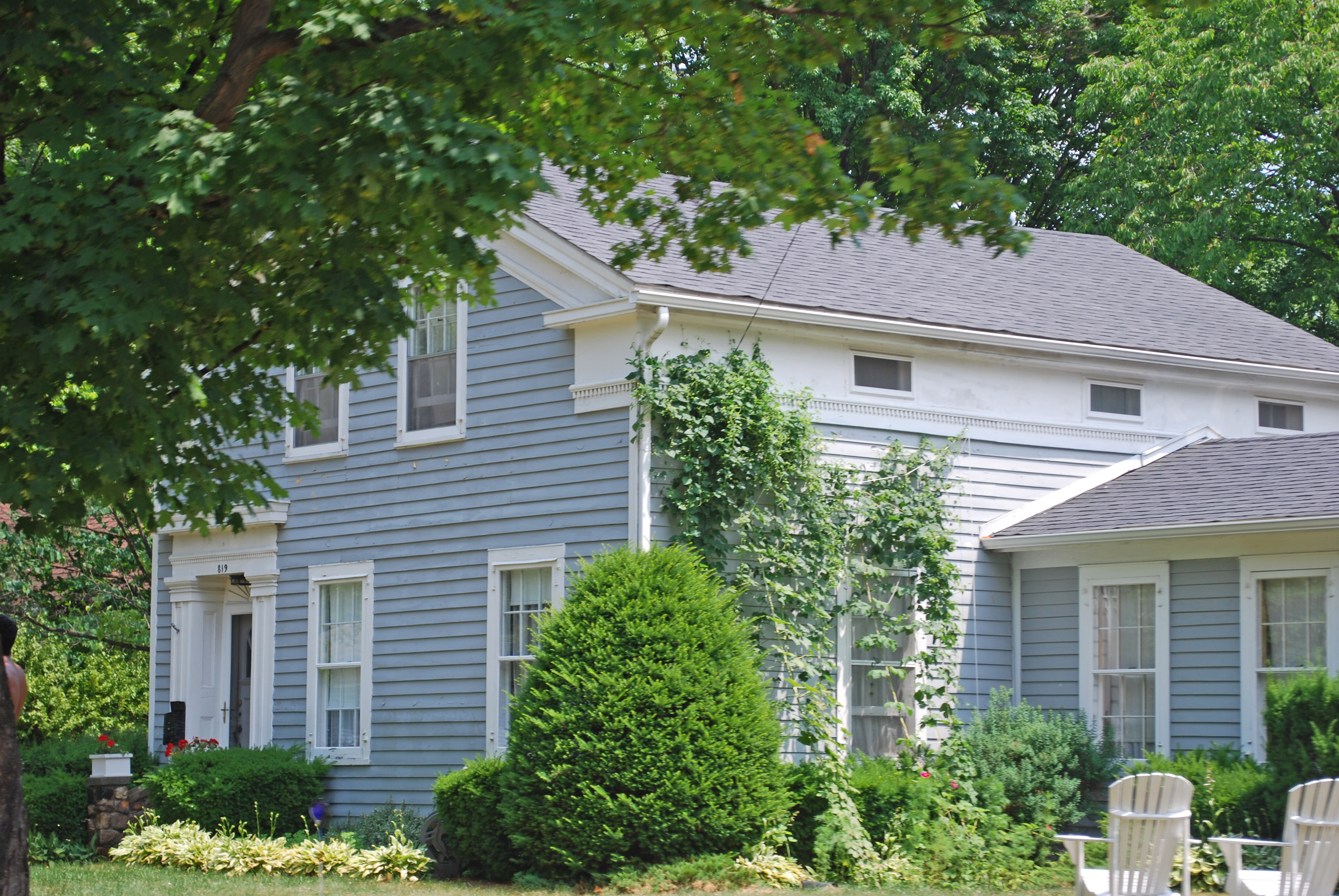
- Interactive map
- Location: 819 S. Leroy St., Fenton, Michigan
- Coordinates: 42°47′21″N 83°42′17″W
- Area: less than one acre
- Built: 1866
- Architectural style: Greek Revival
- MPS: Genesee County MRA
- NRHP reference No.: 82000498
- Added to NRHP: November 26, 1982

The Benjamin Bangs House is a single-family home located at 819 South Leroy Street in Fenton, Michigan. It was listed on the National Register of Historic Places in 1982.

== History ==
Benjamin Bangs was the first village president of what was then Fentonville, elected in 1863. He built this fine house for his family in about 1866. In later years, the house served as a tea room, corset shop, and radio station at various times.

== Description ==
The Benjamin Bangs House is a two-story frame rectangular Greek Revival with a gable roof and one hip-roofed side wing. The front facade contains a door framed with pilasters and topped with a fanlight-like molding and a full entablature. The gable end terminates in a wide modillioned frieze below a boxed cornice with returns.
