= Scott Township, Henry County, Iowa =

Township in Henry County, Iowa, U.S.

Coordinates: 41°07′N 91°26′W

Scott Township is a township in Henry County, Iowa, USA.
