= Trenton Township, Henry County, Iowa =

Town in USA

Coordinates: 41°02′N 91°40′W

Trenton Township is a township in Henry County, Iowa, USA.
