= Baltimore Township, Henry County, Iowa =

Township in Henry County, Iowa, U.S.

Coordinates: 40.8572°N 91.4276°W

Baltimore Township is a township in Henry County, Iowa, United States. As of the 2020 census, the population was 899 people.
