= John and Lavina Bangs House =

Historic house in Iowa, United States

- U.S. National Register of Historic Places
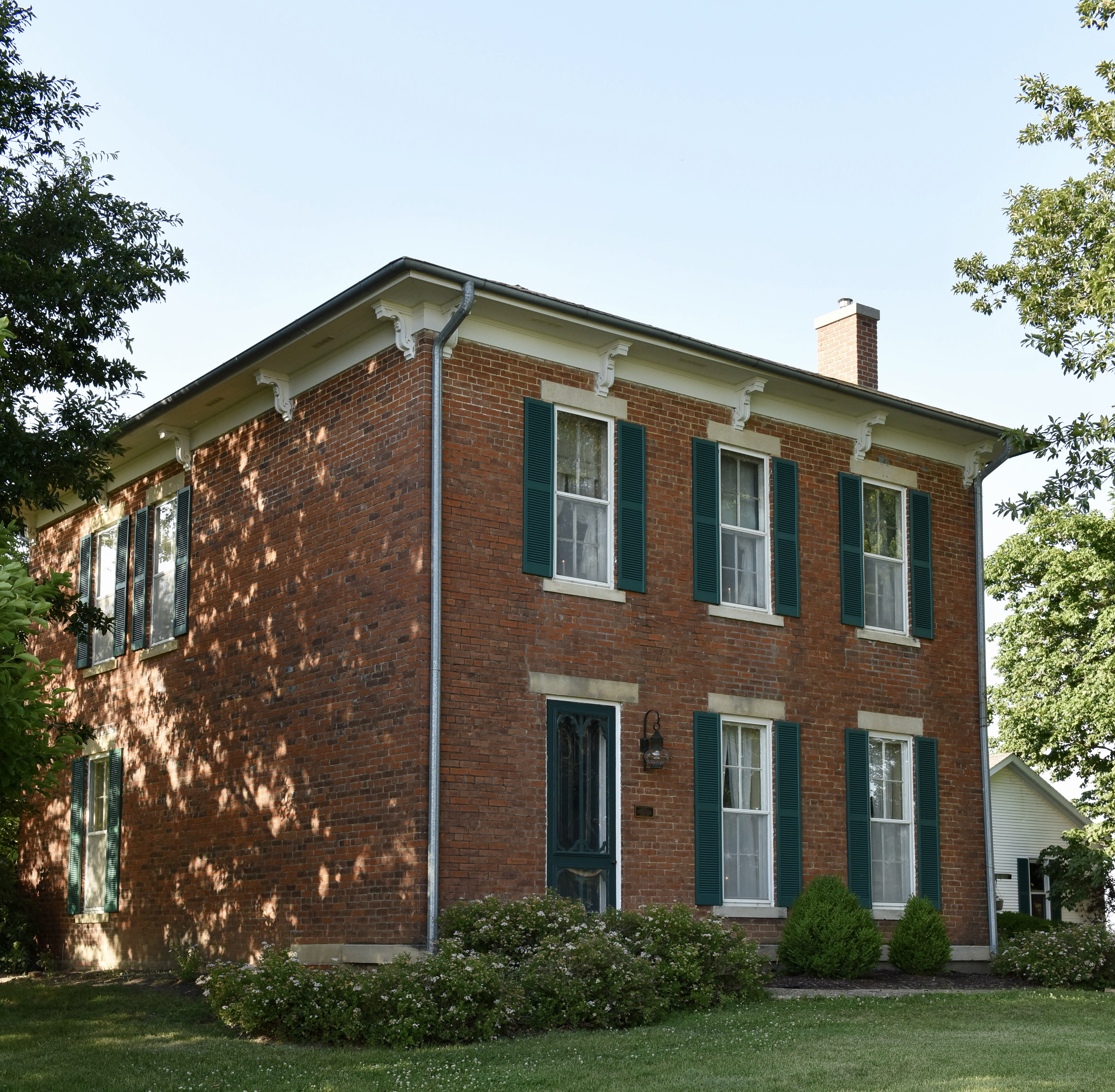

- Location within Iowa Location within the United States
- Location: 2759 Old Highway 34; New London, Iowa
- Coordinates: 40°54′45.2″N 91°22′46.5″W
- Built: 1865
- Architectural style: Italianate
- NRHP reference No.: 03000831
- Added to NRHP: August 28, 2003

The John and Lavina Bangs House is an historic structure located near New London, Iowa, United States. John Bangs was a successful farmer and this is the second house he built on his property. A large Italianate style house on a farm, while not unheard of, was somewhat of a rarity. It is possible that the high-style was chosen, and its location on a major roadway, may indicate the owner's desire to communicate his own or the area's passage from its pioneer origins to a more cultured reality. The house was listed on the National Register of Historic Places in 2003.
