= New London, Iowa =

- City
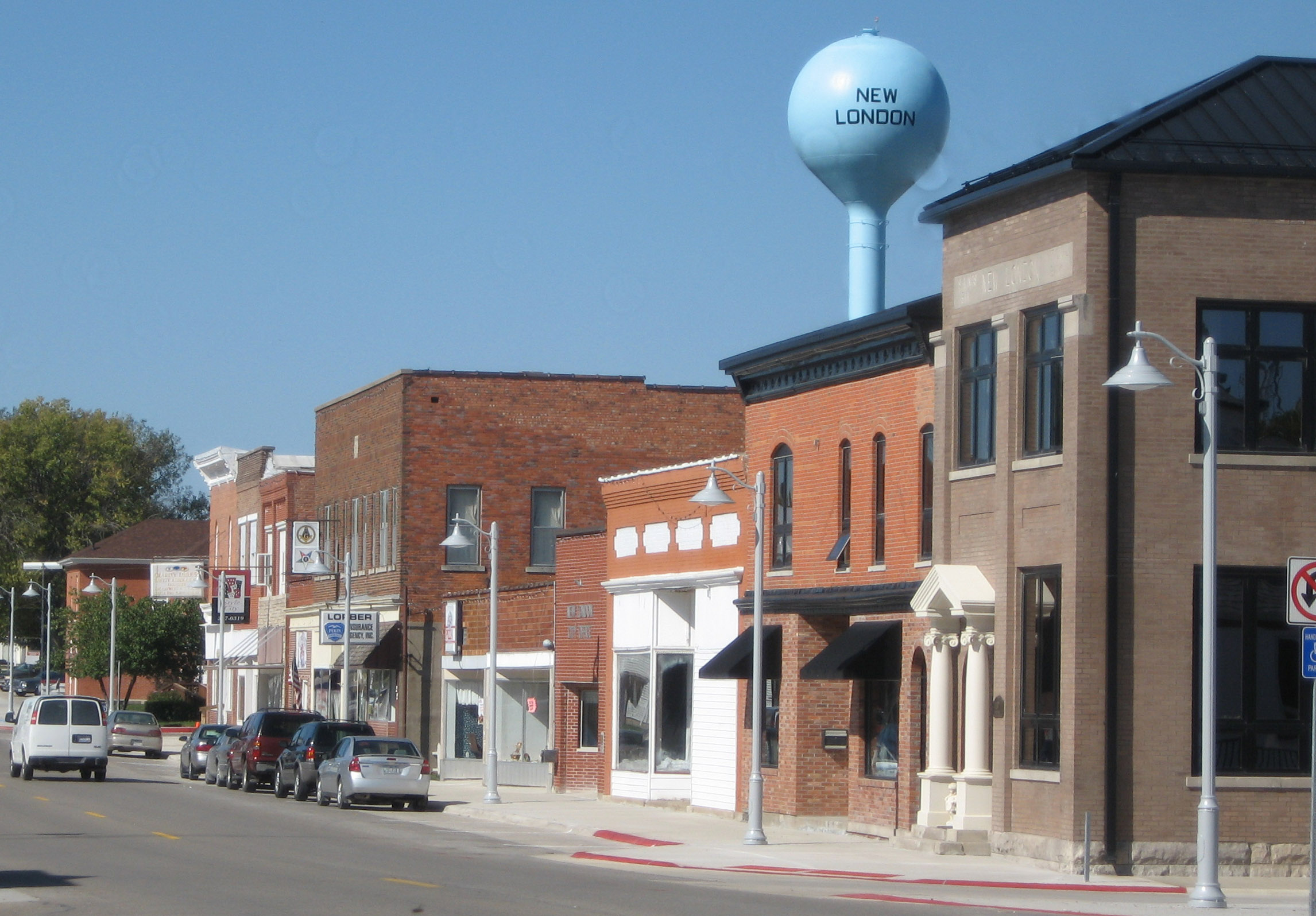
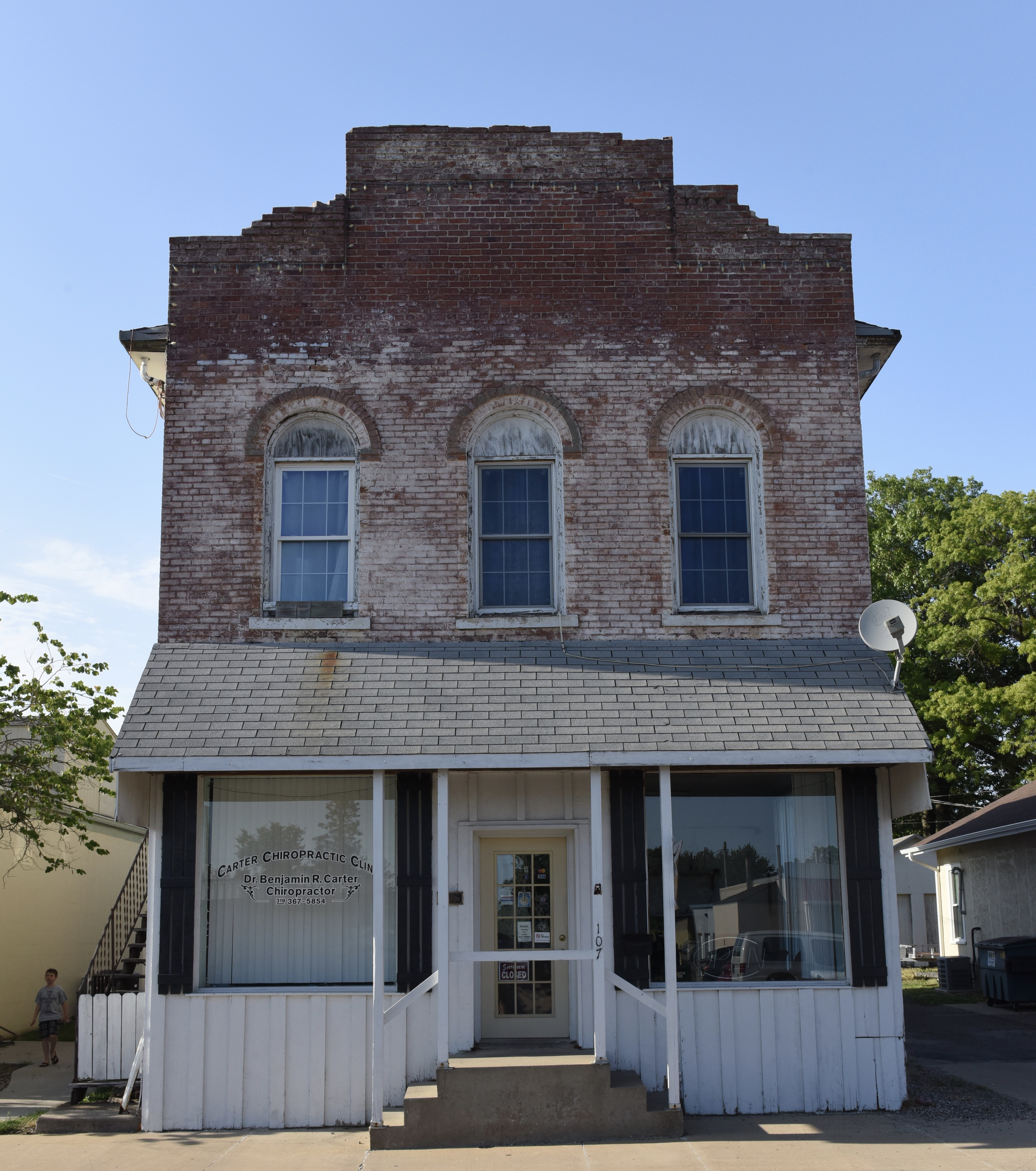
- Downtown New London, Iowa McClellan's General Store

- Location of New London, Iowa
- Coordinates: 40°55′23″N 91°24′4″W
- Country: United States
- State: Iowa
- County: Henry

Area
  - Total: 1.04 sq mi (2.70 km^{2})
  - Land: 1.04 sq mi (2.70 km^{2})
  - Water: 0 sq mi (0.00 km^{2})
- Elevation: 755 ft (230 m)

Population (2020)
  - Total: 1,910
  - Density: 1,835/sq mi (708.4/km^{2})
- Time zone: UTC-6 (Central (CST))
  - Summer (DST): UTC-5 (CDT)
- ZIP code: 52645
- Area code: 319
- FIPS code: 19-56325
- GNIS feature ID: 2395204
- Mayor: Kirk Miller
- Website: www.newlondoniowa.org

New London is a city in Henry County, Iowa, United States. Established in 1833, it was originally called Dover after its founder, Abraham C. Dover, who came to the area from Illinois. It has a total area of 1.01 square miles (2.62 km^{2}), and the population was 1,910 at the time of the 2020 census.

== McClellan's General Store ==
McClellan's General Store is the first building constructed in the simplified Italianate style in town. It was built for James and Adeline McClellan in 1867 on a lot they purchased for $365. Their new mercantile business took the first floor, and their residence was on the second floor. In 1875, the business was renamed McClellan and Stottard Dry Goods Store.

It was listed on the National Register of Historic Places in 2003.

== Demographics ==
Historical populations
Year	Pop.	±%
1880	658	—
1890	580	−11.9%
1900	1,003	+72.9%
1910	1,144	+14.1%
1920	1,144	+0.0%
1930	1,336	+16.8%
1940	1,340	+0.3%
1950	1,510	+12.7%
1960	1,694	+12.2%
1970	1,900	+12.2%
1980	2,043	+7.5%
1990	1,922	−5.9%
2000	1,937	+0.8%
2010	1,897	−2.1%
2020	1,910	+0.7%
Source:"U.S. Census website". United States Census Bureau. and Iowa Data Center; Source: U.S. Decennial Census

=== 2020 census ===
As of the 2020 census, New London had a population of 1,910, with 797 households and 525 families. The population density was 1,834.8 inhabitants per square mile (708.4/km^{2}). There were 835 housing units at an average density of 802.1 per square mile (309.7/km^{2}).

Of the 797 households, 31.6% had children under the age of 18 living with them, 46.7% were married-couple households, 8.8% were cohabitating couples, 28.2% had a female householder with no spouse or partner present, and 16.3% had a male householder with no spouse or partner present. Non-families made up 34.1% of households. About 26.9% of all households were made up of individuals, and 12.7% had someone living alone who was 65 years of age or older.

The median age was 41.1 years. 24.1% of residents were under the age of 18, 26.3% were under the age of 20, 5.6% were between the ages of 20 and 24, 23.2% were from 25 to 44, 24.5% were from 45 to 64, and 20.4% were 65 years of age or older. For every 100 females there were 96.3 males, and for every 100 females age 18 and over there were 91.0 males.

There were 835 housing units, of which 4.6% were vacant. The homeowner vacancy rate was 2.6%, and the rental vacancy rate was 3.2%.

0.0% of residents lived in urban areas, while 100.0% lived in rural areas.

Racial composition as of the 2020 census
Race	Number	Percent
White	1,770	92.7%
Black or African American	28	1.5%
American Indian and Alaska Native	7	0.4%
Asian	8	0.4%
Native Hawaiian and Other Pacific Islander	0	0.0%
Some other race	15	0.8%
Two or more races	82	4.3%
Hispanic or Latino (of any race)	38	2.0%

=== 2010 census ===
As of the census of 2010, there were 1,897 people, 769 households, and 517 families living in the city. The population density was 1,878.2 inhabitants per square mile (725.2/km^{2}). There were 830 housing units at an average density of 821.8 per square mile (317.3/km^{2}). The racial makeup of the city was 96.5% White, 1.7% African American, 0.3% Native American, 0.4% Asian, 0.1% from other races, and 1.1% from two or more races. Hispanic or Latino of any race were 0.9% of the population.

There were 769 households, of which 33.4% had children under the age of 18 living with them, 50.8% were married couples living together, 12.1% had a female householder with no husband present, 4.3% had a male householder with no wife present, and 32.8% were non-families. 27.6% of all households were made up of individuals, and 11% had someone living alone who was 65 years of age or older. The average household size was 2.42 and the average family size was 2.91.

The median age in the city was 38.7 years. 26.1% of residents were under the age of 18; 7% were between the ages of 18 and 24; 24.8% were from 25 to 44; 24.6% were from 45 to 64; and 17.6% were 65 years of age or older. The gender makeup of the city was 48.7% male and 51.3% female.

=== 2000 census ===
As of the census of 2000, there were 1,937 people, 794 households, and 540 families living in the city. The population density was 1,924.9 inhabitants per square mile (743.2/km^{2}). There were 846 housing units at an average density of 840.7 per square mile (324.6/km^{2}). The racial makeup of the city was 98.40% White, 0.31% African American, 0.05% Native American, 0.26% Asian, 0.46% from other races, and 0.52% from two or more races. Hispanic or Latino of any race were 0.77% of the population.

There were 794 households, out of which 31.0% had children under the age of 18 living with them, 55.4% were married couples living together, 9.6% had a female householder with no husband present, and 31.9% were non-families. 27.3% of all households were made up of individuals, and 12.3% had someone living alone who was 65 years of age or older. The average household size was 2.38 and the average family size was 2.89.

24.6% were under the age of 18, 7.8% from 18 to 24, 27.2% from 25 to 44, 23.9% from 45 to 64, and 16.5% were 65 years of age or older. The median age was 38 years. For every 100 females, there were 88.1 males. For every 100 females age 18 and over, there were 84.2 males.

The median income for a household in the city was $39,432, and the median income for a family was $46,389. Males had a median income of $31,324 versus $23,712 for females. The per capita income for the city was $18,301. About 4.8% of families and 6.4% of the population were below the poverty line, including 8.0% of those under age 18 and 10.8% of those aged 65 or over.

== Education ==
The New London Community School District operates local public schools.

== Notable people ==
- Silas Reynolds Barton, Nebraska politician
- William Hale, Wyoming territorial governor

== See also ==
The following properties are listed on the National Register of Historic Places:

- John and Lavina Bangs House
- McClellan's General Store
- Peterson Manufacturing Building
- Smith and Weller Building
