= Hillsboro, Iowa =

- City
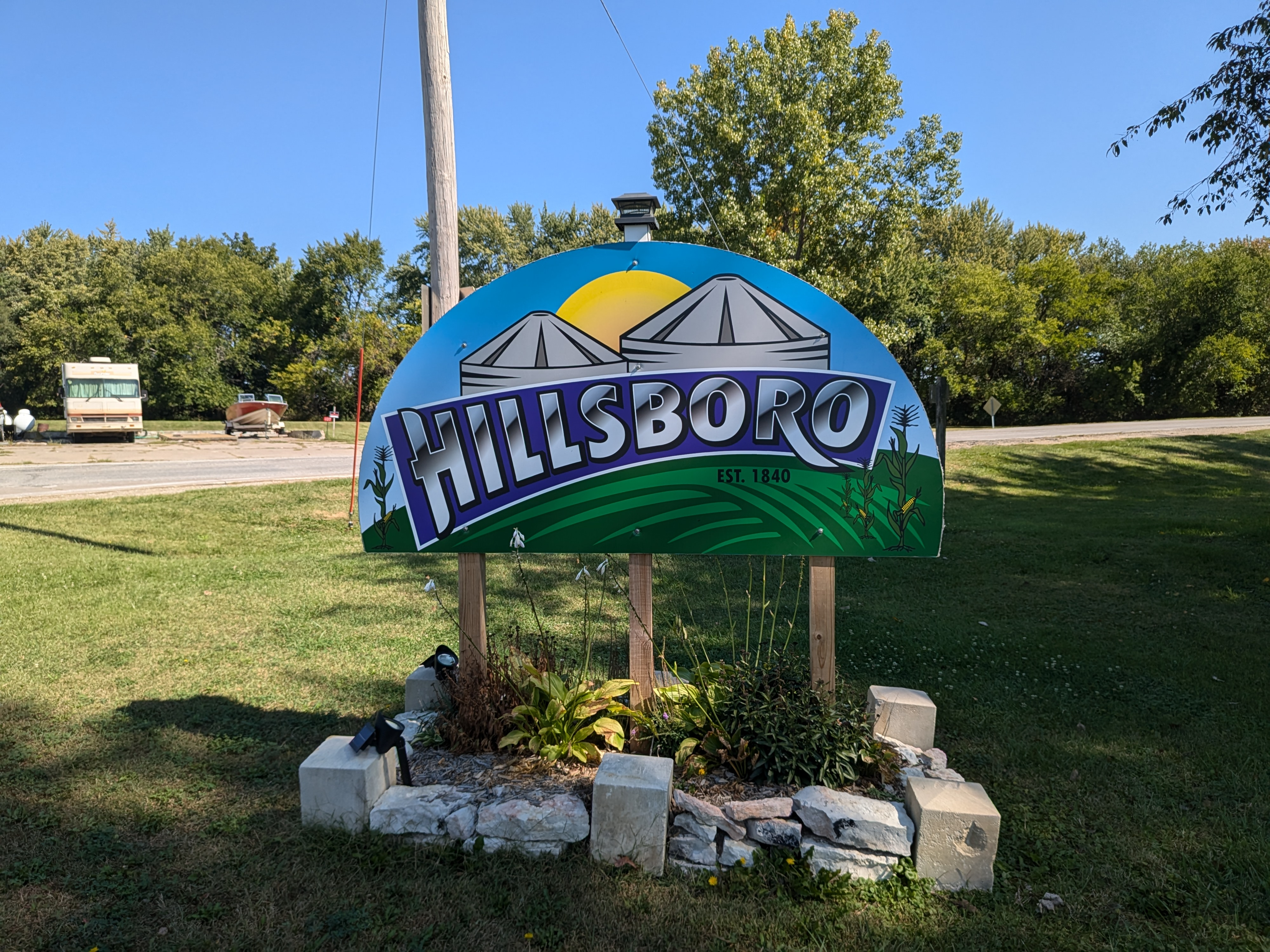
- Welcome Sign in Hillsboro

- Location of Hillsboro, Iowa
- Coordinates: 40°50′14″N 91°42′41″W
- Country: United States
- State: Iowa
- County: Henry
- Incorporated: July 19, 1916

Area
  - Total: 0.58 sq mi (1.50 km^{2})
  - Land: 0.58 sq mi (1.50 km^{2})
  - Water: 0 sq mi (0.00 km^{2})
- Elevation: 735 ft (224 m)

Population (2020)
  - Total: 163
  - Density: 281.5/sq mi (108.69/km^{2})
- Time zone: UTC-6 (Central (CST))
  - Summer (DST): UTC-5 (CDT)
- ZIP code: 52630
- Area code: 319
- FIPS code: 19-36390
- GNIS feature ID: 2394387

Hillsboro is a city in Henry County, Iowa, United States. The population was 163 at the time of the 2020 census.

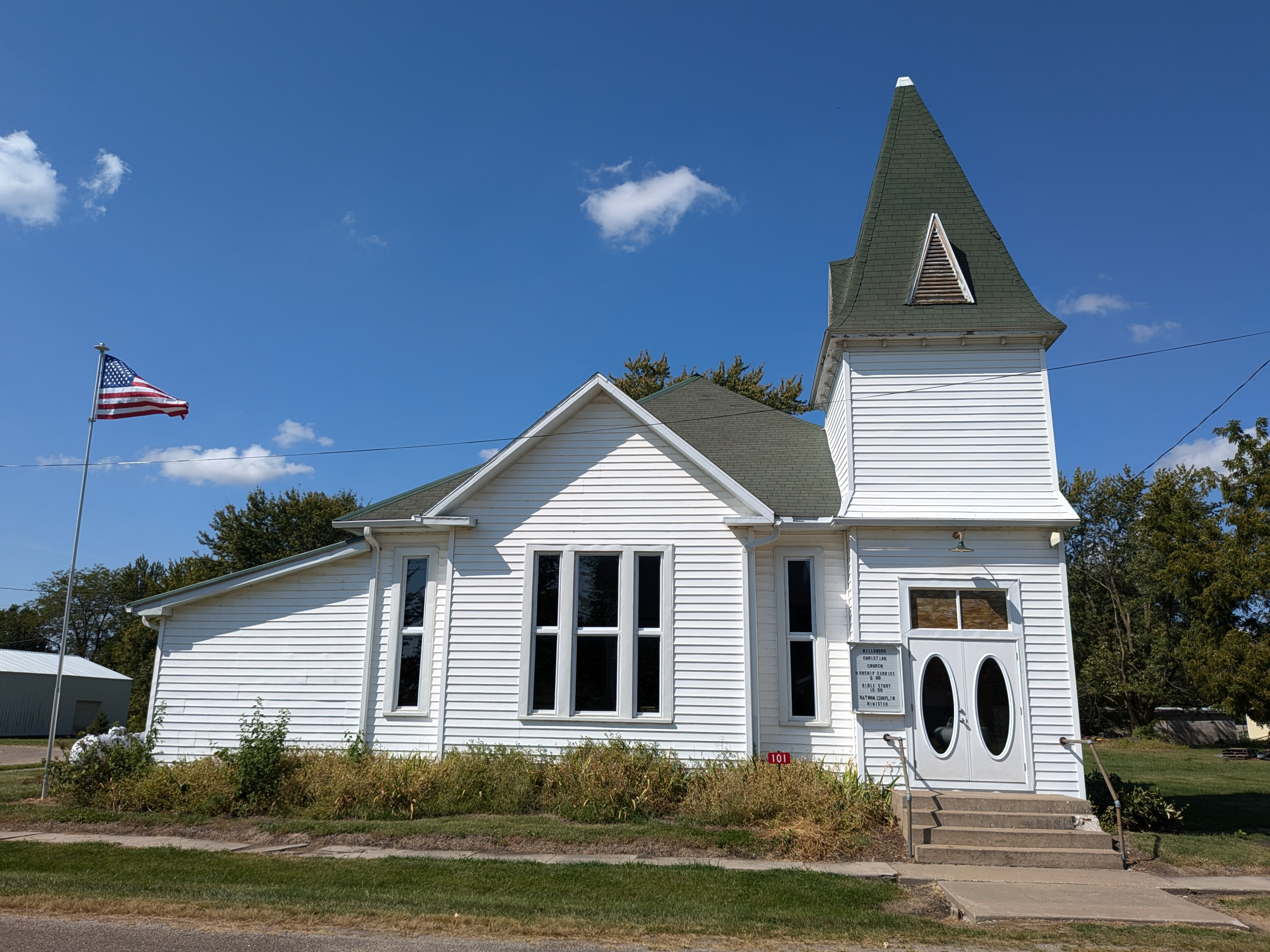
Hillsboro Christian church

== History ==
Hillsboro (or Hillsborough) was originally called Washington, but the name was changed when it was discovered there was already a community called Washington in Iowa. Hillsboro was laid out in 1840.

== Geography ==
According to the United States Census Bureau, the city has a total area of 0.51 square miles (1.32 km^{2}), all land.

== Demographics ==
Historical populations
Year	Pop.	±%
1880	154	—
1890	177	+14.9%
1900	228	+28.8%
1910	265	+16.2%
1920	318	+20.0%
1930	281	−11.6%
1940	280	−0.4%
1950	253	−9.6%
1960	218	−13.8%
1970	252	+15.6%
1980	208	−17.5%
1990	169	−18.8%
2000	205	+21.3%
2010	180	−12.2%
2020	163	−9.4%
Source:"U.S. Census website". United States Census Bureau. and Iowa Data Center; Source: U.S. Decennial Census

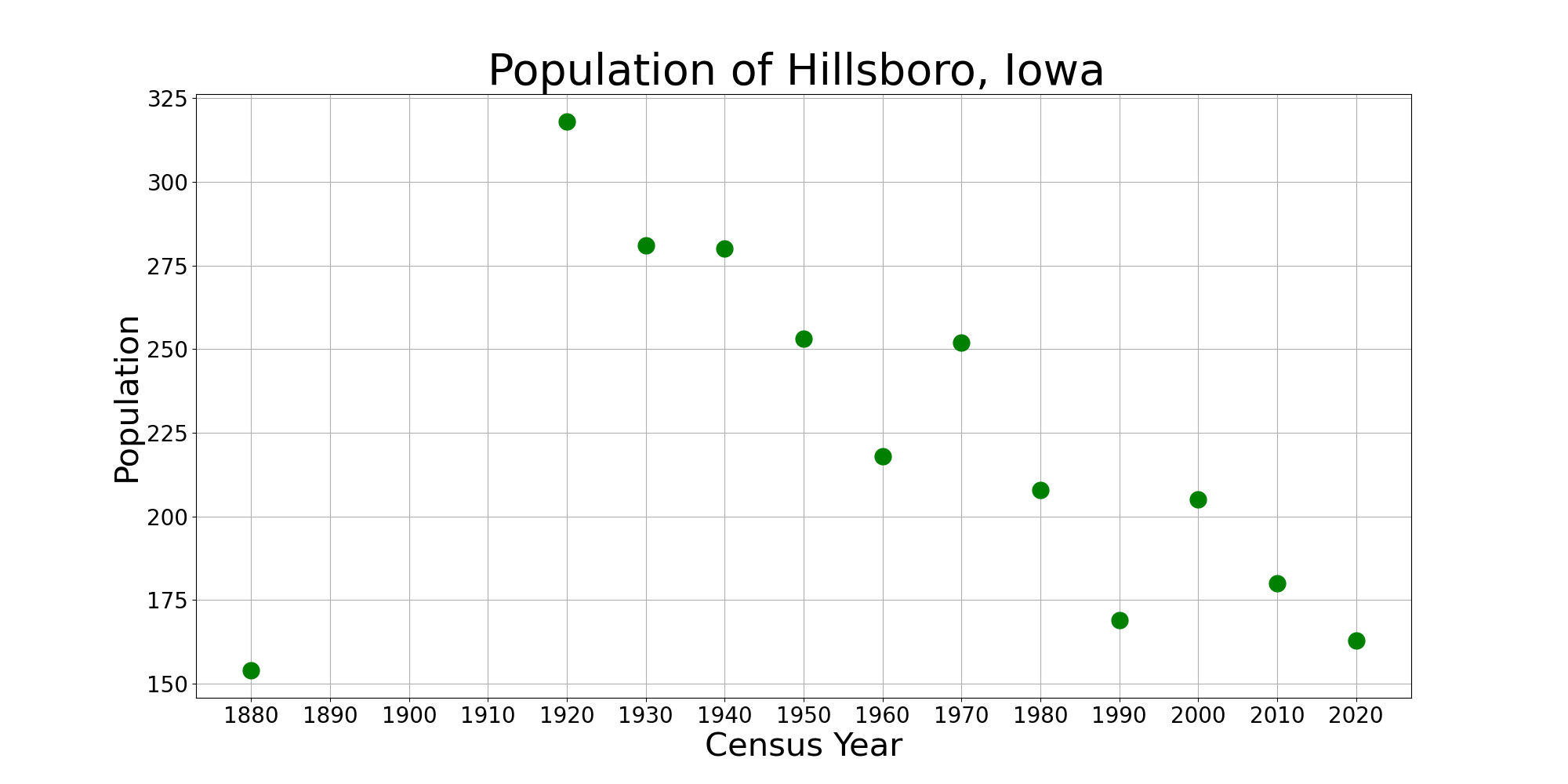
The population of Hillsboro, Iowa from US census data

=== 2020 census ===
As of the census of 2020, there were 163 people, 70 households, and 53 families residing in the city. The population density was 281.5 inhabitants per square mile (108.7/km^{2}). There were 84 housing units at an average density of 145.1 per square mile (56.0/km^{2}). The racial makeup of the city was 92.6% White, 0.0% Black or African American, 1.2% Native American, 0.0% Asian, 0.6% Pacific Islander, 0.6% from other races and 4.9% from two or more races. Hispanic or Latino persons of any race comprised 1.8% of the population.

Of the 70 households, 40.0% of which had children under the age of 18 living with them, 50.0% were married couples living together, 8.6% were cohabitating couples, 22.9% had a female householder with no spouse or partner present and 18.6% had a male householder with no spouse or partner present. 24.3% of all households were non-families. 21.4% of all households were made up of individuals, 8.6% had someone living alone who was 65 years old or older.

The median age in the city was 44.9 years. 24.5% of the residents were under the age of 20; 3.7% were between the ages of 20 and 24; 22.1% were from 25 and 44; 28.8% were from 45 and 64; and 20.9% were 65 years of age or older. The gender makeup of the city was 50.9% male and 49.1% female.

=== 2010 census ===
At the 2010 census there were 180 people in 80 households, including 50 families, in the city. The population density was 352.9 inhabitants per square mile (136.3/km^{2}). There were 90 housing units at an average density of 176.5 per square mile (68.1/km^{2}). The racial makup of the city was 98.9% White, 0.6% African American, and 0.6% from two or more races. Hispanic or Latino of any race were 3.3%.

Of the 80 households 27.5% had children under the age of 18 living with them, 45.0% were married couples living together, 8.8% had a female householder with no husband present, 8.8% had a male householder with no wife present, and 37.5% were non-families. 33.8% of households were one person and 12.6% were one person aged 65 or older. The average household size was 2.25 and the average family size was 2.80.

The median age was 46.5 years. 23.9% of residents were under the age of 18; 6.7% were between the ages of 18 and 24; 16.7% were from 25 to 44; 31% were from 45 to 64; and 21.7% were 65 or older. The gender makeup of the city was 51.7% male and 48.3% female.

=== 2000 census ===
At the 2000 census there were 205 people in 81 households, including 54 families, in the city. The population density was 402.7 inhabitants per square mile (155.5/km^{2}). There were 92 housing units at an average density of 180.7 per square mile (69.8/km^{2}). The racial makup of the city was 99.02% White, and 0.98% from two or more races. Hispanic or Latino of any race were 0.98%.

Of the 81 households 34.6% had children under the age of 18 living with them, 53.1% were married couples living together, 11.1% had a female householder with no husband present, and 32.1% were non-families. 28.4% of households were one person and 14.8% were one person aged 65 or older. The average household size was 2.53 and the average family size was 3.04.

The age distribution was 28.8% under the age of 18, 7.3% from 18 to 24, 26.8% from 25 to 44, 24.4% from 45 to 64, and 12.7% 65 or older. The median age was 37 years. For every 100 females, there were 86.4 males. For every 100 females age 18 and over, there were 87.2 males.

The median household income was $35,500 and the median family income was $36,563. Males had a median income of $30,000 versus $20,000 for females. The per capita income for the city was $11,985. About 13.6% of families and 21.8% of the population were below the poverty line, including 31.7% of those under the age of eighteen and 17.9% of those sixty five or over.

== Education ==
The community is served by the Van Buren County Community School District. It was previously in the Harmony Community School District, until it merged into Van Buren County CSD on July 1, 2019.

In 1933, the Hillsboro High School Girls Basketball Team (6 vs 6) made it to the championship game at the State Basketball Tournament and lost to Hampton, 33–22. The Hillsboro team would make it back to the championship game again in 1935, once more named the runner-up of the championship.

Mildred "Millie" Moore Burkhart, Hillsboro graduate, led Hillsboro to two state runner-up finishes and was named by the Des Moines Register as the greatest guard to ever play in basketball. She was selected as the outstanding player in the 1935 state tournament. During this tournament, she was also chosen for the all-state lineup for the third straight year. She was part of the inaugural Iowa State Girls Basketball Hall of Fame in 1961. In 2020, she was inducted into the Van Buren County Athletic Hall of Fame.

In 1935, Grace Watson was one of four selected as an outstanding forward in the state basketball tournament. She was selected for the all-state lineup in 1935 and was second all-state in 1934.

== Notable person ==
- John Whitaker, former Iowa State representative.
