= Henry County, Iowa =

County in Iowa, United States

- County
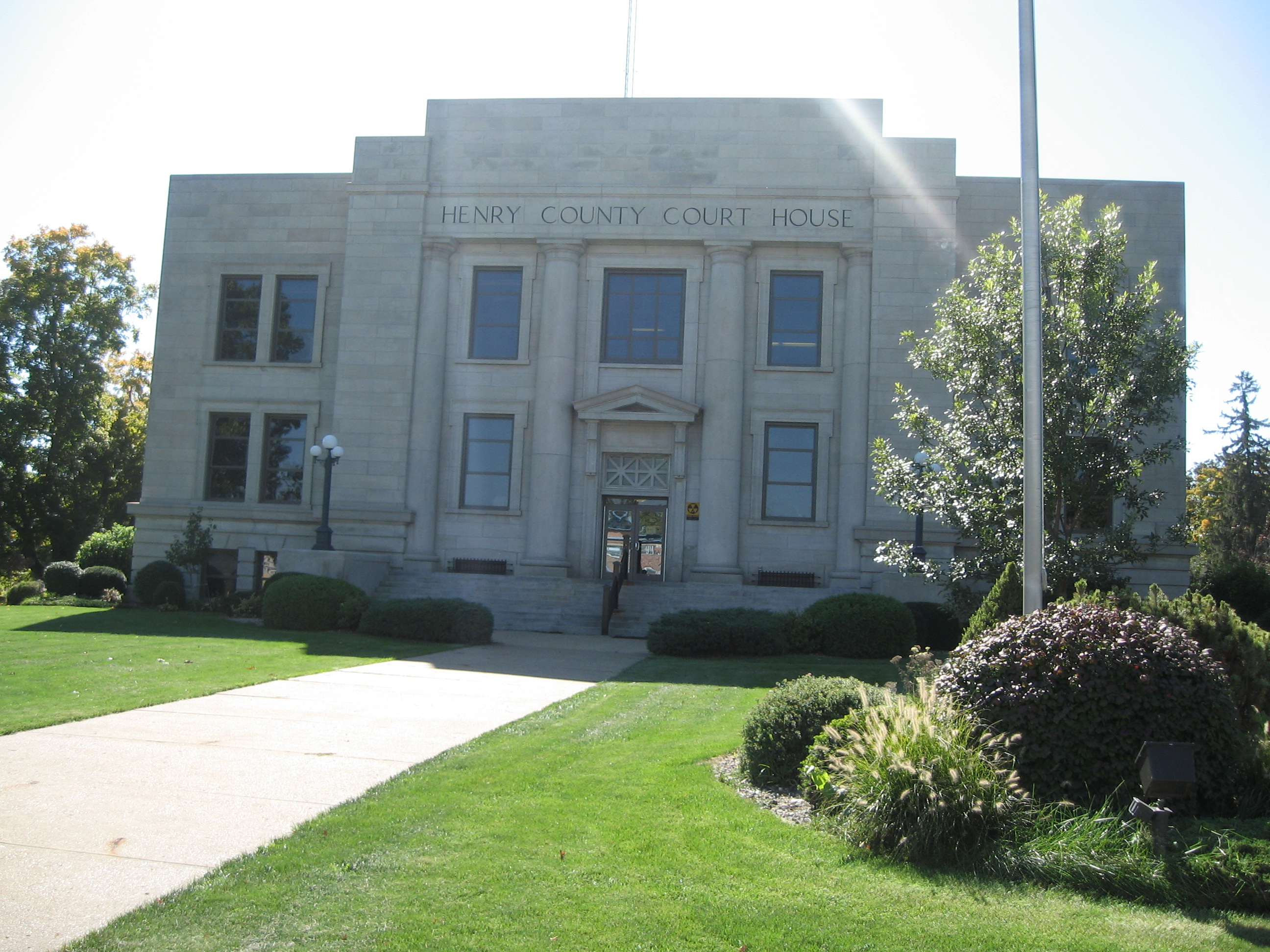
- The Henry County Courthouse in Mount Pleasant

- Location within the U.S. state of Iowa
- Coordinates: 40°59′12″N 91°32′31″W
- Country: United States
- State: Iowa
- Founded: December 7, 1836
- Named for: Henry Dodge
- Seat: Mount Pleasant
- Largest city: Mount Pleasant

Area
  - Total: 437 sq mi (1,130 km^{2})
  - Land: 434 sq mi (1,120 km^{2})
  - Water: 2.2 sq mi (5.7 km^{2}) 0.5%

Population (2020)
  - Total: 20,482
  - Estimate (2025): 19,349 ▼
  - Density: 47.2/sq mi (18.2/km^{2})
- Time zone: UTC−6 (Central)
  - Summer (DST): UTC−5 (CDT)
- Congressional district: 2nd
- Website: henrycounty.iowa.gov
- Iowa county number 44

Henry County is a county located in the U.S. state of Iowa. As of the 2020 census, its population was 20,482. The county seat is Mount Pleasant. The county was named for General Henry Dodge, governor of Wisconsin Territory.

== History ==
Henry County was formed on December 7, 1836, under the jurisdiction of Wisconsin Territory, and became a part of Iowa Territory when it was formed on July 4, 1838. It was named for General Henry Dodge.

The county's first courthouse was built in 1839–1840. A larger courthouse was built in 1871, and the present courthouse was raised in the 20th century, being placed into service on August 4, 1914.

== Geography ==
According to the United States Census Bureau, the county has a total area of 437 square miles (1,130 km^{2}), of which 2.2 square miles (5.7 km^{2}) (0.5%) are covered by water.

=== Major highways ===
- U.S. Highway 34
- U.S. Highway 218/Iowa Highway 27
- Iowa Highway 16
- Iowa Highway 78

=== Transit ===
- Mount Pleasant station

=== Adjacent counties ===
- Washington County (north)
- Louisa County (northeast)
- Des Moines County (east)
- Lee County (south)
- Van Buren County (southwest)
- Jefferson County (west)

== Demographics ==
Historical population
Census	Pop.	Note	%±
1850	8,707		—
1860	18,701		114.8%
1870	21,463		14.8%
1880	20,986		−2.2%
1890	18,895		−10.0%
1900	20,022		6.0%
1910	18,640		−6.9%
1920	18,298		−1.8%
1930	17,660		−3.5%
1940	17,994		1.9%
1950	18,708		4.0%
1960	18,187		−2.8%
1970	18,114		−0.4%
1980	18,890		4.3%
1990	19,226		1.8%
2000	20,336		5.8%
2010	20,145		−0.9%
2020	20,482		1.7%
2025 (est.)	19,349	▼	−5.5%
U.S. Decennial Census; 1790–1960 1900–1990; 1990–2000 2010–2020

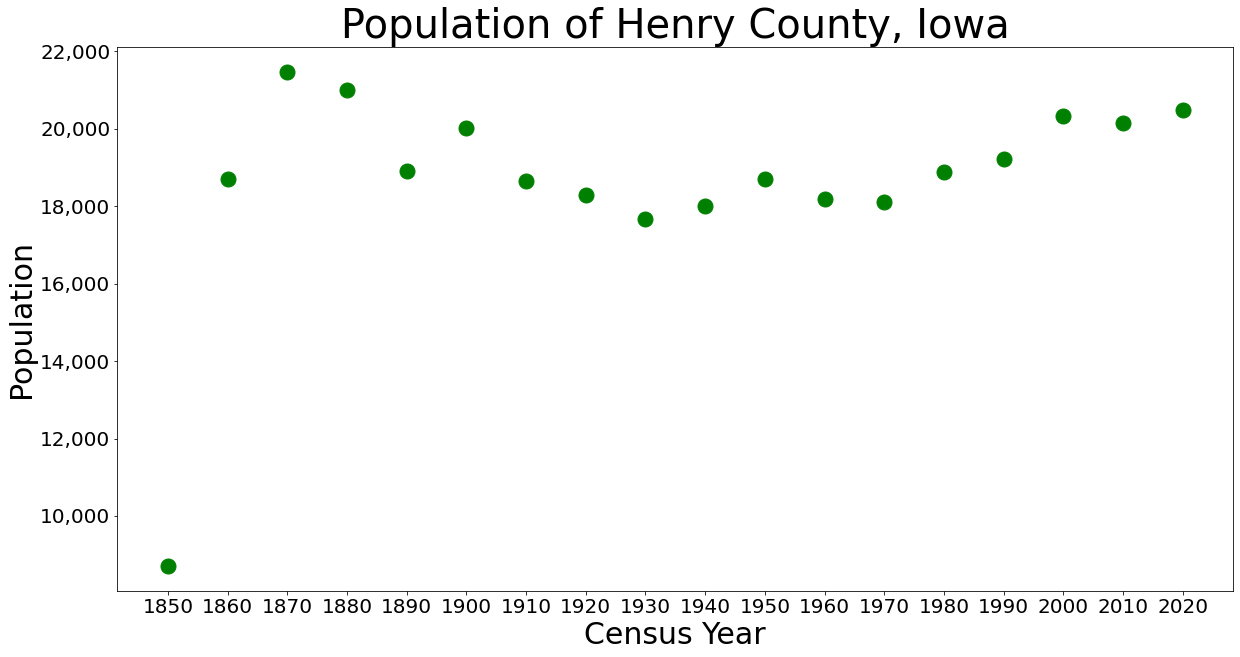
Population of Henry County from US census data

=== 2020 census ===
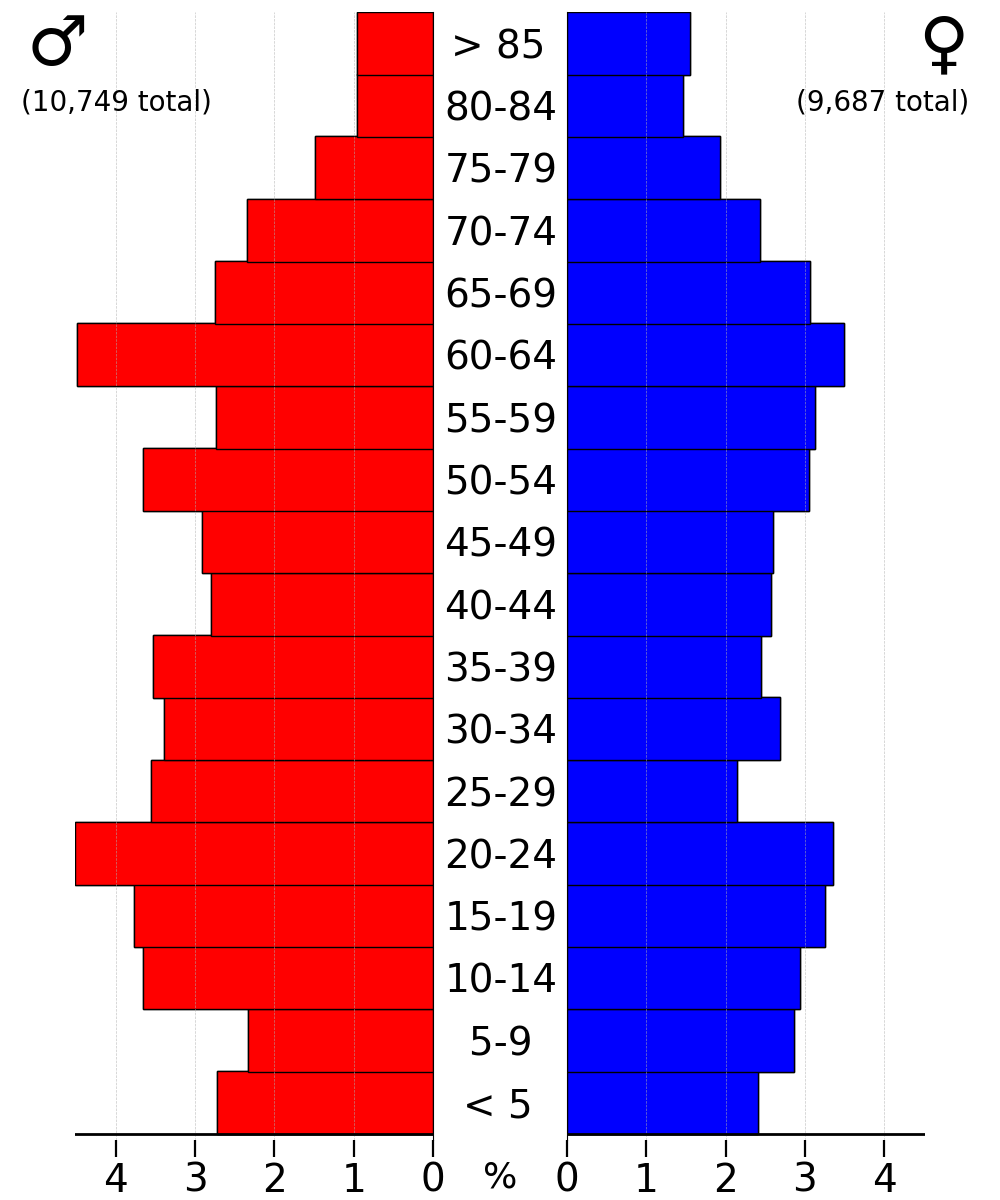
The 2022 US Census population pyramid for Henry County from American Community Survey five-year estimates

As of the 2020 census, the county had a population of 20,482 and a population density of 46.9/sq mi (18.1/km^{2}); 95.23% of the population reported being of one race.

The median age was 40.8 years, 21.1% of residents were under the age of 18, and 19.8% were 65 years of age or older. For every 100 females there were 108.1 males, and for every 100 females age 18 and over there were 107.8 males age 18 and over.

45.3% of residents lived in urban areas, while 54.7% lived in rural areas.

There were 7,746 households in the county, of which 27.9% had children under the age of 18 living in them. Of all households, 51.3% were married-couple households, 17.4% were households with a male householder and no spouse or partner present, and 24.5% were households with a female householder and no spouse or partner present. About 28.5% of all households were made up of individuals and 13.7% had someone living alone who was 65 years of age or older.

There were 8,398 housing units, of which 7.8% were vacant. Among occupied housing units, 72.8% were owner-occupied and 27.2% were renter-occupied. The homeowner vacancy rate was 1.4% and the rental vacancy rate was 6.8%.

The racial makeup of the county was 87.8% White, 2.5% Black or African American, 0.4% American Indian and Alaska Native, 2.2% Asian, <0.1% Native Hawaiian and Pacific Islander, 2.3% from some other race, and 4.8% from two or more races. Hispanic or Latino residents of any race comprised 5.3% of the population.

Henry County Racial Composition
Race	Number	Percentage
White (NH)	17,643	86.14%
Black or African American (NH)	501	2.44%
Native American (NH)	60	0.3%
Asian (NH)	451	2.2%
Pacific Islander (NH)	8	0.04%
Other or multiracial (NH)	736	3.6%
Hispanic or Latino	1,083	5.3%

=== 2010 census ===
The 2010 census recorded a population of 20,145 in the county, with a population density of 47.5/sq mi (18.3/km^{2}). The county had 8,280 housing units, of which 7,666 were occupied.

=== 2000 census ===
As of the 2000 census, 20,336 people, 7,626 households, and 5,269 families resided in the county. The population density was 47 people per square mile (18 people/km^{2}). The 8,246 housing units had an average density of 19 units per square mile (7.3 units/km^{2}). The racial makeup of the county was 94.78% White, 1.49% Black or African American, 0.24% Native American, 1.88% Asian, 0.02% Pacific Islander, 0.52% from other races, and 1.07% from two or more races. About 1.26% of the population were Hispanics or Latinos of any race.

Of the 7,626 households, 32.8% had children under 18 living with them, 57.7% were married couples living together, 8.2% had a female householder with no husband present, and 30.9% were not families. About 26.8% of all households were made up of individuals, and 12.2% had someone living alone who was 65 or older. The average household size was 2.46 and the average family size was 2.98.

In the county, the age distribution was 24.7% under 18, 9.0% from 18 to 24, 29.2% from 25 to 44, 22.5% from 45 to 64, and 14.7% who were 65 or older. The median age was 37 years. For every 100 females, there were 102.5 males; for every 100 females 18 and over, there were 102.8 males.

The median income for a household in the county was $39,087, and for a family was $46,985. Males had a median income of $31,801 versus $23,075 for females. The per capita income for the county was $18,192. About 6.70% of families and 8.80% of the population were below the poverty line, including 10.30% of those under age 18 and 9.30% of those age 65 or over.

== Communities ==
=== Cities ===
- Coppock
- Hillsboro
- Mount Pleasant
- New London
- Olds
- Rome
- Salem
- Wayland
- Westwood
- Winfield

=== Unincorporated communities ===
- Lowell (CDP)
- Mount Union (CDP)
- Oakland Mills
- Swedesburg (CDP)
- Tippecanoe
- Trenton (CDP)

=== Townships ===
- Baltimore
- Canaan
- Center
- Jackson
- Jefferson
- Marion
- New London
- Salem
- Scott
- Tippecanoe
- Trenton
- Wayne

=== Population ranking ===
The population ranking of the following table is based on the 2020 census of Henry County.

Rank	City/town/etc.	Municipal type	Population (2020 Census)
1	† Mount Pleasant	City	9,274
2	New London	City	1,910
3	Winfield	City	1,033
4	Wayland	City	964
5	Salem	City	394
6	Olds	City	192
7	Hillsboro	City	163
8	Mount Union	CDP	120
9	Rome	City	114
10	Westwood	City	101
11	Coppock (partially in Jefferson and Washington Counties)	City	36

† county seat

== Politics ==
Henry County is one of the most Republican counties in Iowa. It has backed Democratic Party candidates in only five elections for president from 1880 to the present.

United States presidential election results for Henry County, Iowa
Year	Republican		Democratic		Third party(ies)	
Year	No.	%	No.	%	No.	%
1896	2,774	55.83%	2,092	42.10%	103	2.07%
1900	2,794	57.64%	1,907	39.34%	146	3.01%
1904	2,647	64.47%	1,259	30.66%	200	4.87%
1908	2,653	60.90%	1,606	36.87%	97	2.23%
1912	1,663	39.12%	1,580	37.17%	1,008	23.71%
1916	2,470	57.99%	1,728	40.57%	61	1.43%
1920	5,254	71.91%	1,939	26.54%	113	1.55%
1924	4,536	62.17%	1,344	18.42%	1,416	19.41%
1928	5,160	70.90%	2,053	28.21%	65	0.89%
1932	3,398	42.09%	4,518	55.96%	158	1.96%
1936	4,480	54.17%	3,542	42.82%	249	3.01%
1940	5,893	67.36%	2,837	32.43%	19	0.22%
1944	5,208	65.12%	2,741	34.27%	49	0.61%
1948	4,620	59.19%	3,042	38.98%	143	1.83%
1952	6,424	71.93%	2,438	27.30%	69	0.77%
1956	5,818	68.49%	2,667	31.39%	10	0.12%
1960	5,531	66.03%	2,839	33.89%	7	0.08%
1964	3,247	43.40%	4,223	56.44%	12	0.16%
1968	4,613	60.23%	2,532	33.06%	514	6.71%
1972	5,066	64.26%	2,721	34.51%	97	1.23%
1976	3,848	48.79%	3,882	49.22%	157	1.99%
1980	4,430	52.35%	3,317	39.20%	715	8.45%
1984	4,516	56.77%	3,377	42.45%	62	0.78%
1988	3,951	50.93%	3,754	48.39%	53	0.68%
1992	3,435	39.81%	3,544	41.08%	1,649	19.11%
1996	3,478	42.03%	3,798	45.90%	999	12.07%
2000	4,476	51.62%	3,907	45.06%	288	3.32%
2004	5,220	55.20%	4,127	43.64%	110	1.16%
2008	4,822	51.41%	4,349	46.36%	209	2.23%
2012	5,035	51.92%	4,460	45.99%	202	2.08%
2016	5,779	61.45%	2,904	30.88%	721	7.67%
2020	6,507	65.19%	3,275	32.81%	200	2.00%
2024	6,439	67.07%	2,995	31.20%	166	1.73%

== Education ==
School districts in the county include:

- Danville Community School District
- Fairfield Community School District
- Fort Madison Community School District
- Mount Pleasant Community School District
- New London Community School District
- Van Buren County Community School District
- WACO Community School District
- Winfield-Mt. Union Community School District

Former school district:

- Harmony Community School District

== See also ==
- National Register of Historic Places listings in Henry County, Iowa
