= Beaver Township, Dallas County, Iowa =

Beaver Township
- Township
- Location in Dallas County
- Coordinates: 41°49′36″N 093°58′57″W
- Country: United States
- State: Iowa
- County: Dallas

Area
  - Total: 35.87 sq mi (92.89 km^{2})
  - Land: 35.85 sq mi (92.86 km^{2})
  - Water: 0.012 sq mi (0.03 km^{2}) 0.03%
- Elevation: 965 ft (294 m)

Population (2000)
  - Total: 500
  - Density: 14/sq mi (5.4/km^{2})
- GNIS feature ID: 0467424

Beaver Township is a township in Dallas County, Iowa, United States. As of the 2000 census, its population was 500.

== Geography ==
Beaver Township covers an area of 35.87 square miles (92.9 km^{2}) and contains one incorporated settlement, Bouton. According to the USGS, it contains one cemetery, Woodward.

The stream of Slough Creek runs through this township.
