= Linn Township, Dallas County, Iowa =

Linn Township
- Township
- Location in Dallas County
- Coordinates: 41°38′56″N 094°13′48″W
- Country: United States
- State: Iowa
- County: Dallas

Area
  - Total: 36.18 sq mi (93.71 km^{2})
  - Land: 36.18 sq mi (93.71 km^{2})
  - Water: 0 sq mi (0 km^{2}) 0%
- Elevation: 1,020 ft (311 m)

Population (2000)
  - Total: 584
  - Density: 16/sq mi (6.2/km^{2})
- GNIS feature ID: 0468281

Linn Township is a township in Dallas County, Iowa, United States. As of the 2000 census, its population was 584.

== Geography ==
Linn Township covers an area of 36.18 square miles (93.7 km^{2}) and contains one incorporated settlement, Linden. According to the USGS, it contains three cemeteries: East Linn, Harper and West Linn.

The Middle Raccoon River and the streams of Cass Creek and Mosquito Creek run through this township.
