= Dallas Township, Dallas County, Iowa =

Dallas Township
- Township
- Location in Dallas County
- Coordinates: 41°48′46″N 094°13′54″W
- Country: United States
- State: Iowa
- County: Dallas

Area
  - Total: 35.98 sq mi (93.19 km^{2})
  - Land: 35.7 sq mi (92.5 km^{2})
  - Water: 0.27 sq mi (0.7 km^{2}) 0.75%
- Elevation: 1,040 ft (317 m)

Population (2000)
  - Total: 381
  - Density: 11/sq mi (4.1/km^{2})
- GNIS feature ID: 0467675

Dallas Township is a township in Dallas County, Iowa, United States. As of the 2000 census, its population was 381.

== Geography ==
Dallas Township covers an area of 35.98 square miles (93.2 km^{2}) and contains one incorporated settlement, Dawson. According to the USGS, it contains one cemetery, Dallas Township Cemeteries.

The streams of Fannys Branch and Greenbrier Creek run through this township.
