= 2024 Perry High School shooting =

2024 mass shooting in Iowa, U.S.

Perry High School shooting
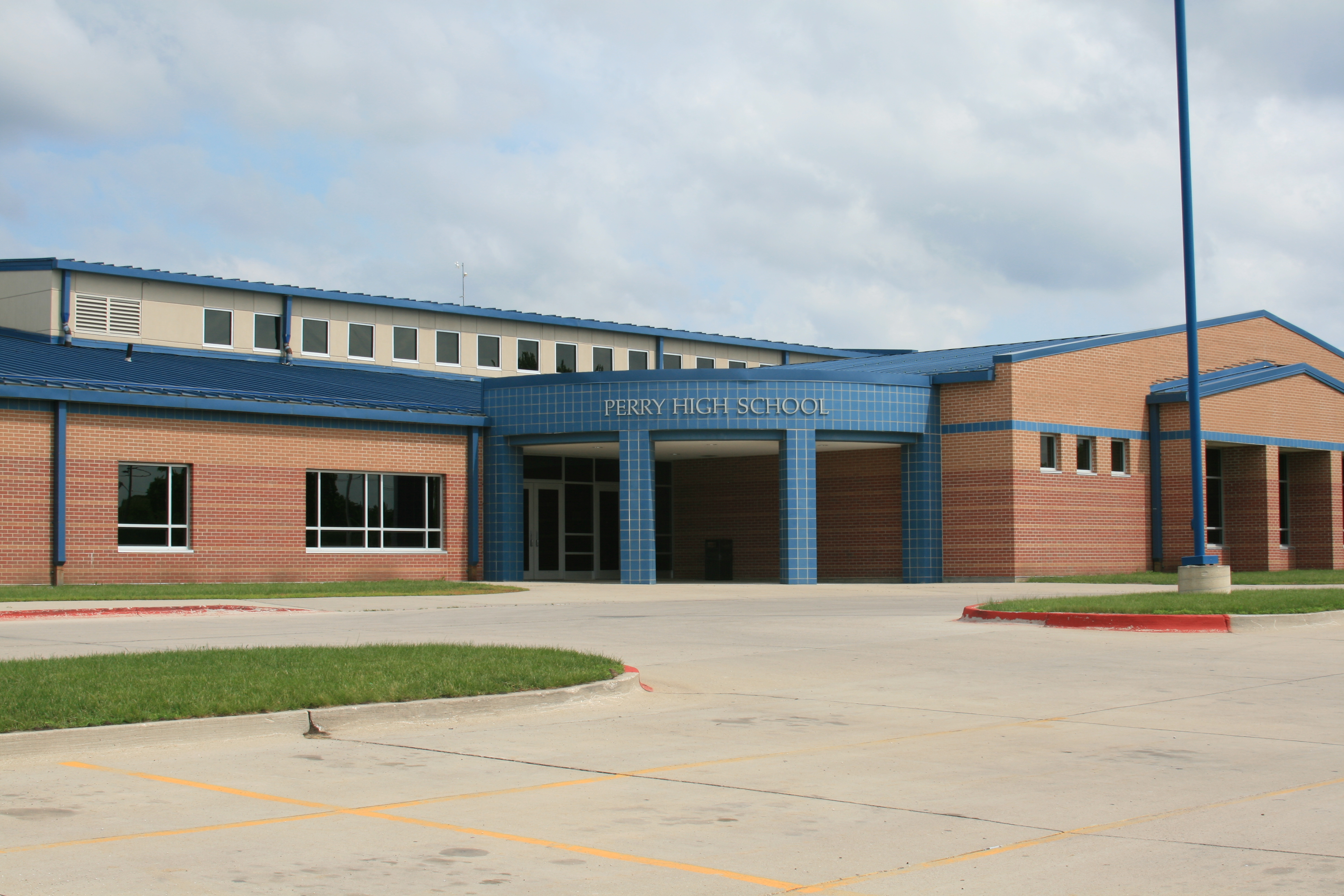
- Perry High School, photographed in 2009
- Location: 41°50′29″N 94°04′51″W; Perry High School; Perry, Iowa, U.S.
- Date: January 4, 2024; 2 years ago 7:35 – 7:39 a.m. (CST; UTC−06:00 (Note: All times are in CST.))
- Target: Students and staff at Perry High School
- Attack type: School shooting; mass shooting; murder-suicide
- Weapons: 20-gauge Remington 870 Express Magnum Youth pump-action shotgun; Revolver (unused); Knife (unused); Improvised explosive device (failed to detonate)
- Deaths: 3 (including the perpetrator)
- Injuries: 6
- Perpetrator: Dylan Jesse Butler
- Motive: Desire for infamy; Suicidal ideation

On January 4, 2024, a mass shooting occurred at Perry High School in Perry, Iowa, United States. Seventeen-year-old student Dylan Butler shot five students and three staff members before killing himself. One of the wounded students, a sixth-grader, died the same day and one of the shot staff members, principal Dan Marburger, died ten days later from injuries sustained during the shooting. It was the first school shooting of 2024.

== Background ==
Perry High School and Perry Middle School are part of the Perry Community School District in Perry, Iowa. The two schools share a building and are connected by a hallway adjacent to the cafeteria, where the shooting occurred. The cafeteria hosts a breakfast program for all middle and high school students before school.

=== Perpetrator ===
Dylan Jesse Butler (October 11, 2006 – January 4, 2024), a Perry resident and student of Perry High School, was identified by police as the shooter. His two friends and their mother described Butler as a quiet, bullied person. His sisters and their mother said the bullying started in elementary school and escalated after his younger sister began being bullied as well. The investigation's report—released October 17—found no evidence that bullying played a role in Butler's motivation. The report concluded that he acted alone without anyone knowingly providing support and was "driven by a desire to commit suicide with the hostile intent of taking others with him".

An investigation determined that the shotgun used by Butler was taken without the owner's knowledge. A revolver was also found on Butler and was legally purchased by his father in 2020, but left unsecured in his home.

Investigators said Butler left a note indicating he sought fame and intended to take his own life. Butler made social media posts before the shooting, including a TikTok post showing him in a Perry High School bathroom stall with a duffel bag, captioned with the text "now we wait". The post was accompanied by the KMFDM song "Stray Bullet", which had been used on the personal website of Eric Harris, one of the perpetrators of the Columbine High School massacre.

== Shooting ==
Butler entered Perry High School at 7:12 am through the main entrance, weapons concealed, before staying in a restroom for twenty minutes, where he concealed himself from surveillance, posted to social media, and started a livestream. As students of all grades (including those from the middle school) concluded band practice and had breakfast at 7:35 am, Butler returned to the commons area and fired upon more than fifty students and staff present, critically injuring 6th-grader Ahmir Jolliff and wounding Principal Dan Marburger along with four other students. He then moved through the school, down hallways, into secured classrooms, and near an exit. There, Marburger confronted him, pleading Butler to stop shooting while allowing students to escape the area before Butler shot him again. Other staff members also helped students, including assistant principal Adam Jessen who carried a wounded student to safety. Student Corey Hoffman, who helped other students escape by using his body as a shield, was shot 9 times and was placed in critical condition. In total, he fired twenty-three rounds from his pump-action shotgun (later identified as a Remington 870 of unknown origin). His revolver, unsecured in his home and brought to school, was never used.

At 7:35 am, Dallas County communications first received alerts from SEARS, a system for schools that allows users to contact emergency services with a button, and a student's 911 call. The first officer entered at 7:38 am, and Butler shot himself within the next minute, being pronounced dead by police at 7:40. The first wave of first responders then arrived at the scene at 7:44. In a later search of the school, police found a homemade bomb and disarmed it safely.

More than 150 officers arrived at the school to find its occupants either evacuating or under shelter-in-place. The middle school attached to the high school was cleared by 8:25 a.m., and the high school was cleared by 8:27 a.m. A nearby elementary school was dismissed by 8:32 a.m. By 9:27 a.m., the FBI and the ATF were on the scene. While some students ran to homes close to the campus after evacuating, others went to reunification centers such as the National Guard Armory, the Perry Lutheran Homes, and the McCreary Community building.

Later in the day, eleven-year-old Ahmir Jolliff was pronounced dead having been shot three times. Ten days later, Principal Marburger died. Others injured included two staff members and four students, one of whom was in critical condition.

== Reactions ==
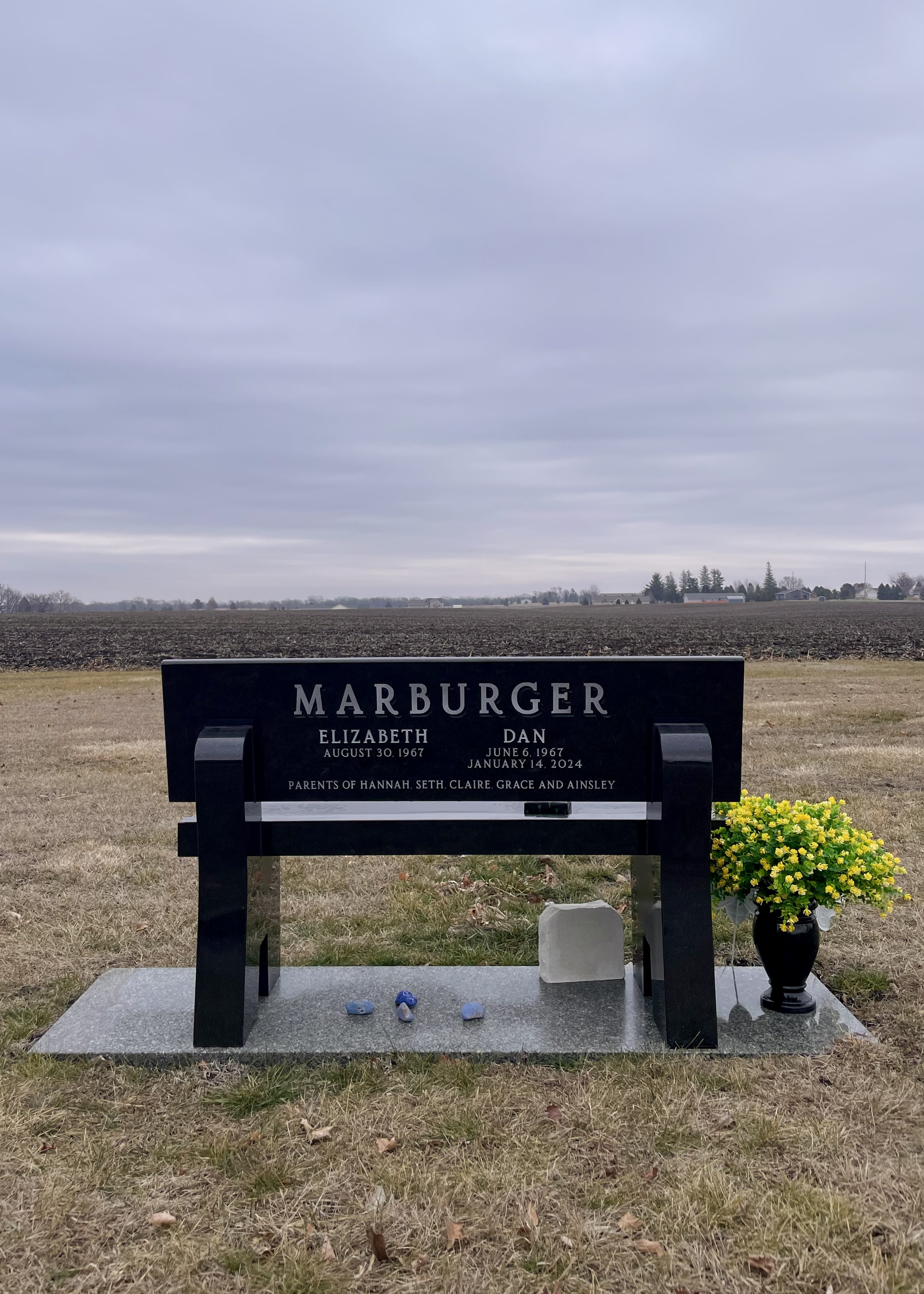
The grave marker of Dan Marburger located in Violet Hill Cemetery, about 1.6 miles (2.5 kilometers) from Perry High School

A memorial was planned and held at a local park the same day of the shooting. A local Methodist church offered their building as a sanctuary for those impacted. At least one GoFundMe was created to help those affected.

Local and state education, police, and the Iowa Firearms Coalition released statements supporting affected members of the community and sympathizing with the victims of and families affected by the shooting. A statement from the White House press secretary called the shooting a "heartbreaking" event, calling on Congress to act against gun violence. Several political figures, including Vivek Ramaswamy, who was holding a campaign event in Perry on the same day, Governor Kim Reynolds, Nikki Haley, Joni Ernst, Zach Nunn, Chuck Grassley, Rita Hart, and Brenna Bird released statements or social media posts offering condolences to the victims of the attack. Donald Trump also offered condolences, adding "It's just horrible, so surprising to see it here. But we have to get over it, we have to move forward". In a press briefing, the White House used the shooting to call for gun control.

According to NBC News, right-leaning figures such as Libs of TikTok, Donald Trump Jr., and Elon Musk "zeroed in" on LGBTQ symbols displayed by Butler's social media accounts to suggest that he was transgender.

In April 2025, Perry High School band held a concert in memory of Jolliff and Marburger, which featured the premiere of a piece entitled A Mere Moment, composed by Michele Fernandez, as well as a collaboration with Central College's Symphonic Wind Ensemble, which was Marburger's Alma mater. Perry High School named their gym after Marburger, inscribing "Dan Marburger Court" on the floor. In July 2024, Drake University honored Marburger by awarding him an Iowa Character Award. In October 2024, Hometown Heritage inducted Marburger into its Wall of Witnesses, which honors influential Perry residents. On June 2, 2025, the city of Perry installed a park bench with the words "You've got a friend in me" written on it, honoring Ahmir Jolliff. A tree was also planted behind the bench.

=== Perry County, Tennessee ===
On September 22, 2025, retired police officer Larry Bushart was arrested for sharing a Facebook meme image quoting Donald Trump's response to the 2024 Perry High School shooting that "We have to get over it" in response to a planned memorial for the shooting death of conservative political activist Charlie Kirk. The charges alleged that Bushart intended to commit a mass shooting against Perry County High School in Tennessee, though Perry County Sheriff Nick Weems later admitted that he knew the reference to Perry High School in the meme referred to the mass shooting event in Iowa. Bail was set at $2 million, and prosecutors postponed a hearing to reduce bail from October 9 until December 4, 2025. After charges were dropped in late October, Bushart sued the county and its sheriff for first-amendment rights violations in December. The sheriff's office settled for $835,000 in May 2026.

== See also ==
- Columbine effect
- Gun violence in the United States
- List of school shootings in the United States by death toll
- List of mass shootings in the United States in 2024
- List of school shootings in the United States (2000–present)
- 2022 East High School shooting
- Misinformation about violence by transgender people
