= Perry Community School District =

Public school district in Perry, Iowa, United States

Location
- Perry, Iowa Dallas, Boone, and Greene counties United States
- Coordinates: 41°50′29″N 94°04′51″W

District information
- Type: Local school district
- Grades: K-12
- Superintendent: Clark Wicks
- Schools: 3
- Budget: $30,485,000 (2020-21)
- NCES District ID: 1922530

Students and staff
- Students: 1812 (2022-23)
- Teachers: 133.58 FTE
- Staff: 147.45 FTE
- Student–teacher ratio: 13.56
- Athletic conference: Heart of Iowa Conference
- District mascot: Bluejay
- Colors: Blue and white

Other information
- Website: www.perry.k12.ia.us

The Perry Community School District is a rural public school district headquartered in Perry, Iowa, United States.

The district is mostly in northern Dallas County, with a smaller area in Boone County, and a small portion of Greene County. The district serves Perry and the surrounding rural areas, including the towns of Dawson and Bouton.

Clark Wicks has been superintendent since 2017, after serving as the part-time superintendent at Orient-Macksburg Community School District. He formerly served as the principal at Perry Elementary from 1989 to 2012.

== Schools ==
- Perry Elementary School
- Perry Middle School
- Perry High School

== Perry High School ==
Perry High School is a high school located in the city of Perry, Iowa.

Perry High School was the victim of a school shooting on January 4, 2024. The Perry High School shooting was the first school shooting of 2024. There were 3 deaths which included the perpetrator, Dylan Butler.

=== Athletics ===
The Bluejays compete in the Heart of Iowa Athletic Conference in the following sports:

==== Fall sports ====
- Cross country (boys' and girls')
- Swimming (girls')
- Volleyball (girls')
- Football

==== Winter sports ====
- Basketball (boys' and girls')
  - Boys' – 1988 Class 2A State Champions
  - Girls' – 2-time State Champions (1930, 2002)
- Wrestling
- Swimming (boys')

==== Spring sports ====
- Track and field
  - Boys' – 1962 Class A State Champions
- Golf
  - Boys' – 1983 Class 3A State Champions
- Soccer
- Baseball
- Softball

=== Shooting ===
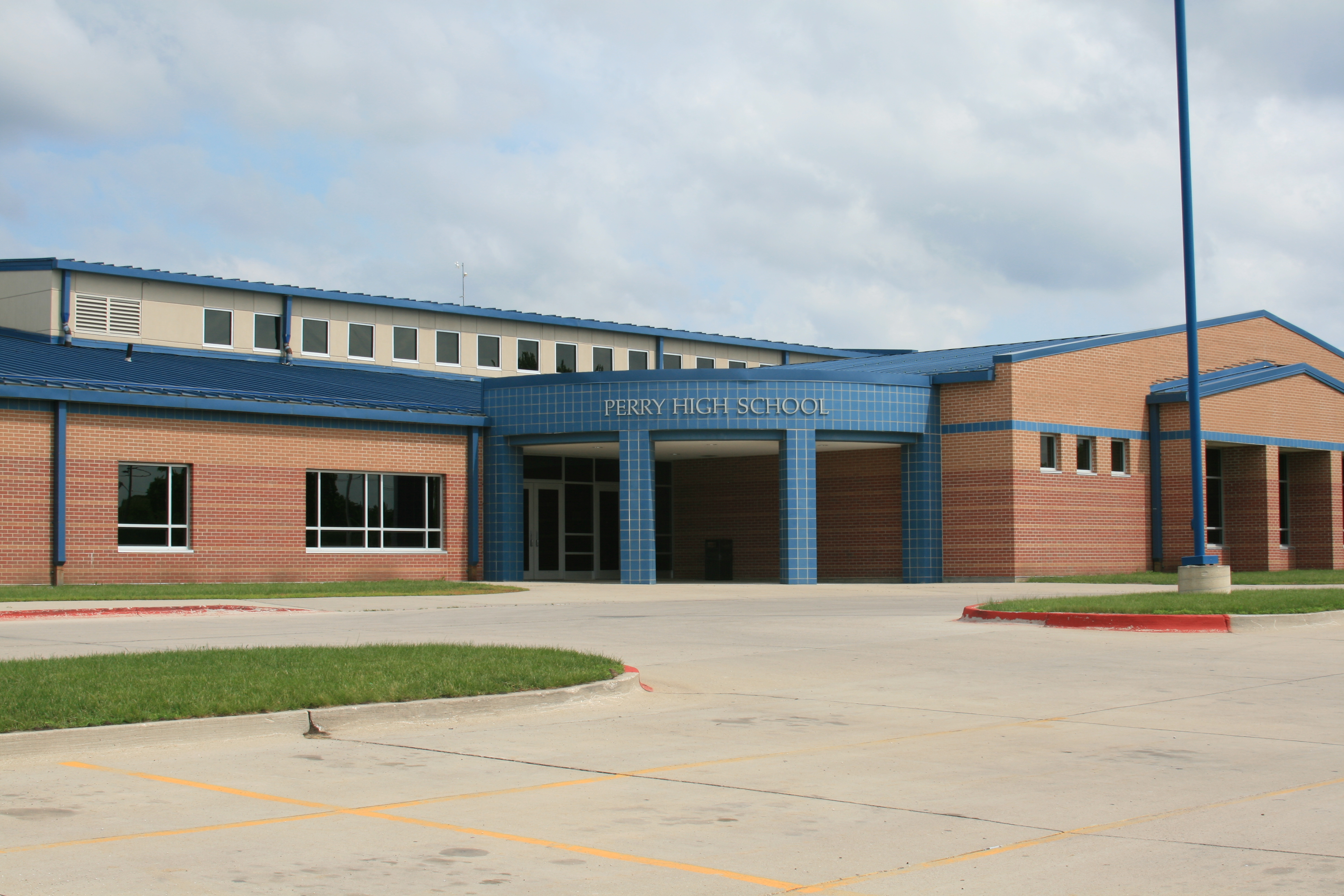
Perry High School, photographed in 2009

A mass shooting occurred on January 4, 2024, at Perry High School in Perry, Iowa, United States. Seventeen-year-old student Dylan Butler shot five students and three staff members before killing himself. One of the wounded students, a sixth-grader, died the same day and one of the shot staff members, principal Dan Marburger, died ten days later from injuries sustained during the shooting. It was the first school shooting of 2024.

The shooting occurred during a morning breakfast program at the school. The shooter, Dylan Butler, was armed with a pump-action shotgun, a small-caliber handgun and an improvised explosive device.

== Notable alumni ==
- Sam Brinton, former deputy assistant secretary for the Office of Nuclear Energy

== See also ==
- List of school districts in Iowa
- List of high schools in Iowa
