= Spring Valley Township =

Spring Valley Township may refer to the following townships in the United States:

- Spring Valley Township, Dallas County, Iowa
- Spring Valley Township, Monona County, Iowa
- Spring Valley Township, Cherokee County, Kansas
- Spring Valley Township, McPherson County, Kansas
- Spring Valley Township, Fillmore County, Minnesota
- Spring Valley Township, Greene County, Ohio
