= Xenia, Iowa =

Xenia, Iowa may refer to the following places in the U.S. state of Iowa:

- Xenia, Dallas County, Iowa
- Xenia, Hardin County, Iowa, later Secor
