= Spring Valley Township, Dallas County, Iowa =

Spring Valley Township
- Township
- Location in Dallas County
- Coordinates: 41°49′29″N 094°06′23″W
- Country: United States
- State: Iowa
- County: Dallas

Area
  - Total: 35.8 sq mi (92.7 km^{2})
  - Land: 35.41 sq mi (91.72 km^{2})
  - Water: 0.38 sq mi (0.99 km^{2}) 1.07%
- Elevation: 932 ft (284 m)

Population (2000)
  - Total: 8,204
  - Density: 232/sq mi (89.4/km^{2})
- GNIS feature ID: 0468745

Spring Valley Township is a township in Dallas County, Iowa, USA. As of the 2000 census, its population was 8,204.

== Geography ==
Spring Valley Township covers an area of 35.79 square miles (92.7 km^{2}) and contains one incorporated settlement, Perry. According to the USGS, it contains five cemeteries: Highview Memorial Gardens, Mowrer, Saint Patrick's, Valleyview and Violet Hill.

The streams of Bucks Branch, Elm Branch, Frog Creek and Swan Lake Branch run through this township.

== Transportation ==
Spring Valley Township contains one airport, Perry Municipal Airport.
