= Sugar Grove Township, Dallas County, Iowa =

Sugar Grove Township
- Township
- Location in Dallas County
- Coordinates: 41°43′55″N 093°58′47″W
- Country: United States
- State: Iowa
- County: Dallas

Area
  - Total: 36.89 sq mi (95.54 km^{2})
  - Land: 36.80 sq mi (95.32 km^{2})
  - Water: 0.085 sq mi (0.22 km^{2}) 0.23%
- Elevation: 1,007 ft (307 m)

Population (2000)
  - Total: 947
  - Density: 26/sq mi (9.9/km^{2})
- GNIS feature ID: 0468758

Sugar Grove Township is a township in Dallas County, Iowa, USA. As of the 2000 census, its population was 947.

== Geography ==
Sugar Grove Township covers an area of 36.89 square miles (95.5 km^{2}) and contains one incorporated settlement, Minburn. According to the USGS, it contains five cemeteries: Brethren, Elmwood, Greenwood, Minburn and Saint Marys.
