= Colfax Township, Dallas County, Iowa =

Colfax Township
- Township
- Location in Dallas County
- Coordinates: 41°38′36″N 094°06′18″W
- Country: United States
- State: Iowa
- County: Dallas

Area
  - Total: 36.6 sq mi (94.9 km^{2})
  - Land: 36.6 sq mi (94.9 km^{2})
  - Water: 0 sq mi (0 km^{2}) 0%
- Elevation: 928 ft (283 m)

Population (2000)
  - Total: 403
  - Density: 11/sq mi (4.2/km^{2})
- GNIS feature ID: 0467633

Colfax Township is a township in Dallas County, Iowa, United States. As of the 2000 census, its population was 403.

== Geography ==
Colfax Township covers an area of 36.64 square miles (94.9 km^{2}) and contains no incorporated settlements. According to the USGS, it contains one cemetery, Panther Creek Church of the Brethren Cemetery.

The streams of East Branch Panther Creek and West Branch Panther Creek run through this township.

== History ==
=== Panther Store ===
Along the north, Colfax Township borders Washington Township and the line running between the two follows Iowa Highway 44, which at an earlier date was known as the "Panora Speedway". Sometime before 1900 a group of farmers formed a board and sold shares to build Panther Store on the northwest corner of the intersection (Today:Highway 44 and J Avenue), known as the Panther Co-operative Association. It was operated by Israel Bever and it handled a variety of commodities.

On the northeast corner of the intersection (within Washington Township) a blacksmith shop was built. On the southwest corner, Will Bazor built a 'tin shop' to construct and repair windmills.

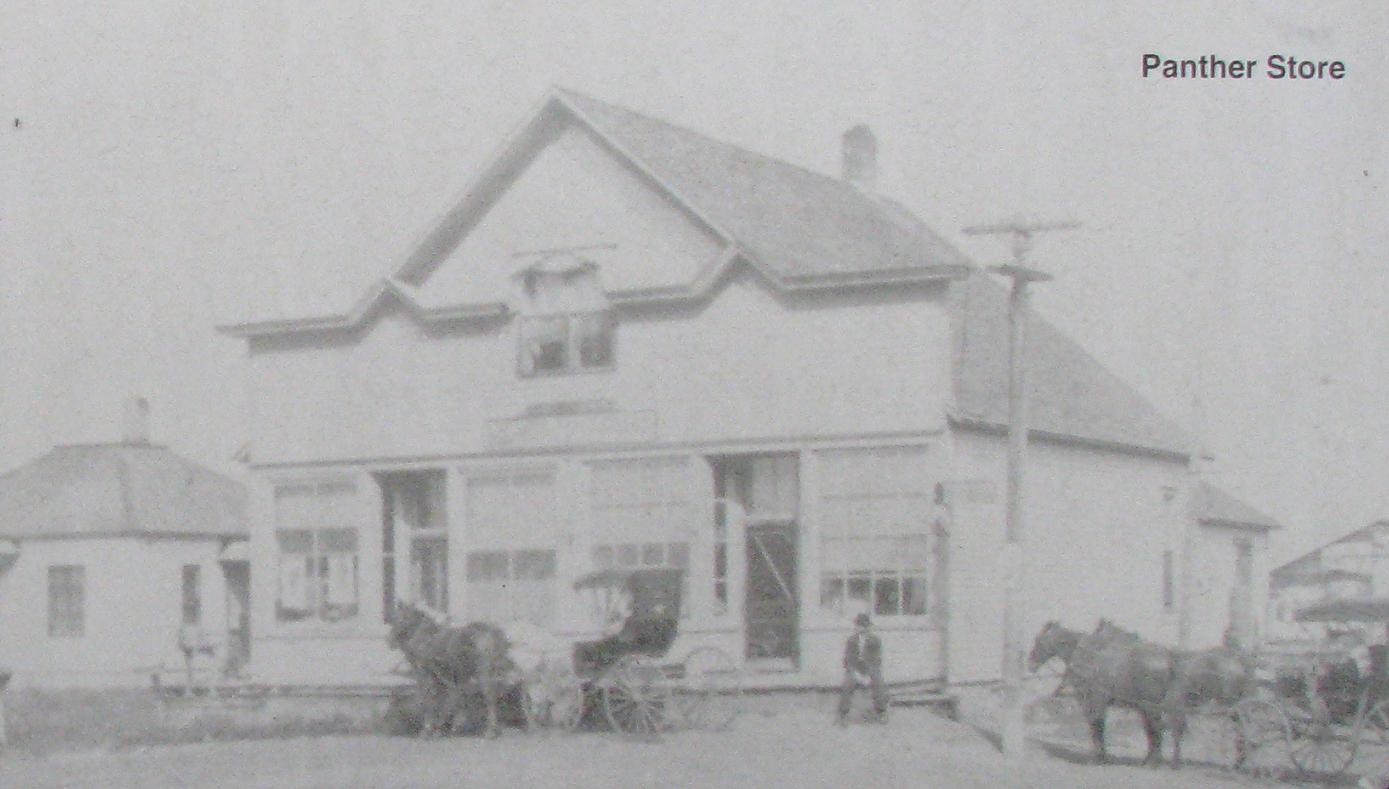
Panther Store 1928

About 1934 John and Mart Sheaffer bought up all of the Co-operative Association and became full owners of Panther Store. Rooms above the store served as living quarters for the manager. The store became a popular place for farmers to congregate. On Saturday afternoons and on rainy days, the hitching racks filled up with teams as folks came for supplies. They bought groceries, dry goods, shoes, tobacco, kerosene, men's overalls and shirts, mittens, canned goods, shucking pegs, ammunition, and candy. Panther served as a produce store, buying poultry, eggs, cream, and butter. They took orders for buggy, wagons, a variety of farm machinery, fencing materials, and furniture. These orders were shipped to Dallas Center and then hauled out by teams. When cars and trucks came more into use, they were used, instead of horse-drawn wagons to bring supplies from Des Moines. Motorized travel made it necessary to install a gasoline pump.

For a short while, a post office resided inside Panther store, where mail was held until picked up. Neighbors would sometimes fetch it for those nearby. Robert Bentall recalls having a regular pigeon-holed rack where he would hold mail for friends to pick up at his house.

Many good times were enjoyed by the men of the community as this (Panther Store) turned out to be quite a recreational center for them as they enjoyed ball games, wrestling, boxing and pulling square holds.

=== Kennedy Station ===
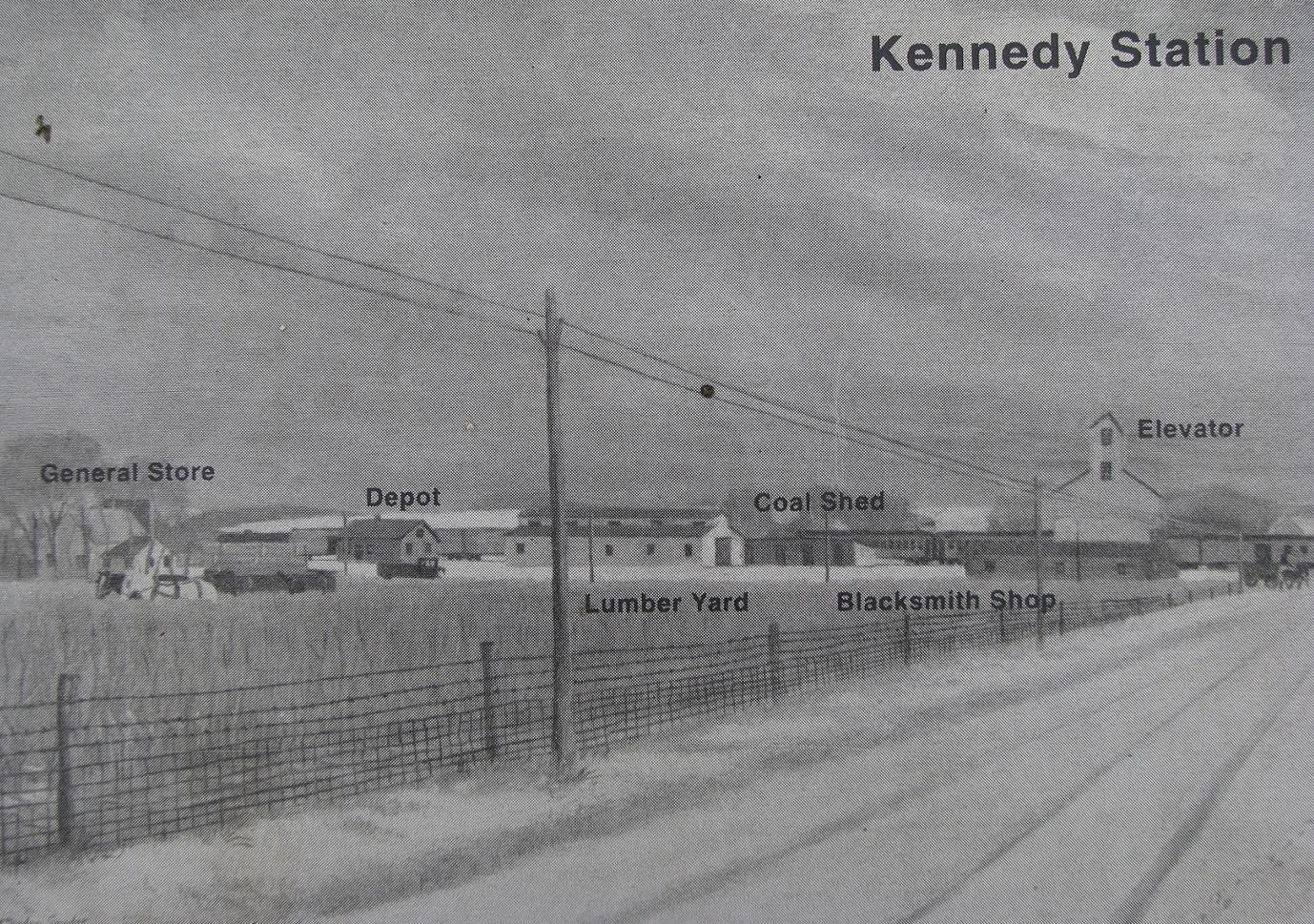
Kennedy Station

In 1879 the railroad was constructed through Colfax Township of Dallas County, Iowa. Kennedy Station, named after Francis A. Kennedy who owned the land, became a thriving and prosperous community. Its livelihood centered on the train depot. With no other close by businesses, a small community sprang up, including a small post office, the depot, a grain elevator, a lumberyard, a stockyard, a blacksmith, and three residences. The population soon grew to nineteen.

As an important gathering place, the blacksmith shop kept busy with shoeing horses, building hayrack and buggy wheels, and fixing just about anything that broke. This business was much appreciated by the farmers from the surrounding area.

The country store burned down in 1932. Then as roads improved, the population began traveling to the nearby towns of Adel and Redfield to obtain their much needed supplies. By 1958 the community was nearly gone, with only the grain elevator as a reminder. Today, even that landmark has disappeared.

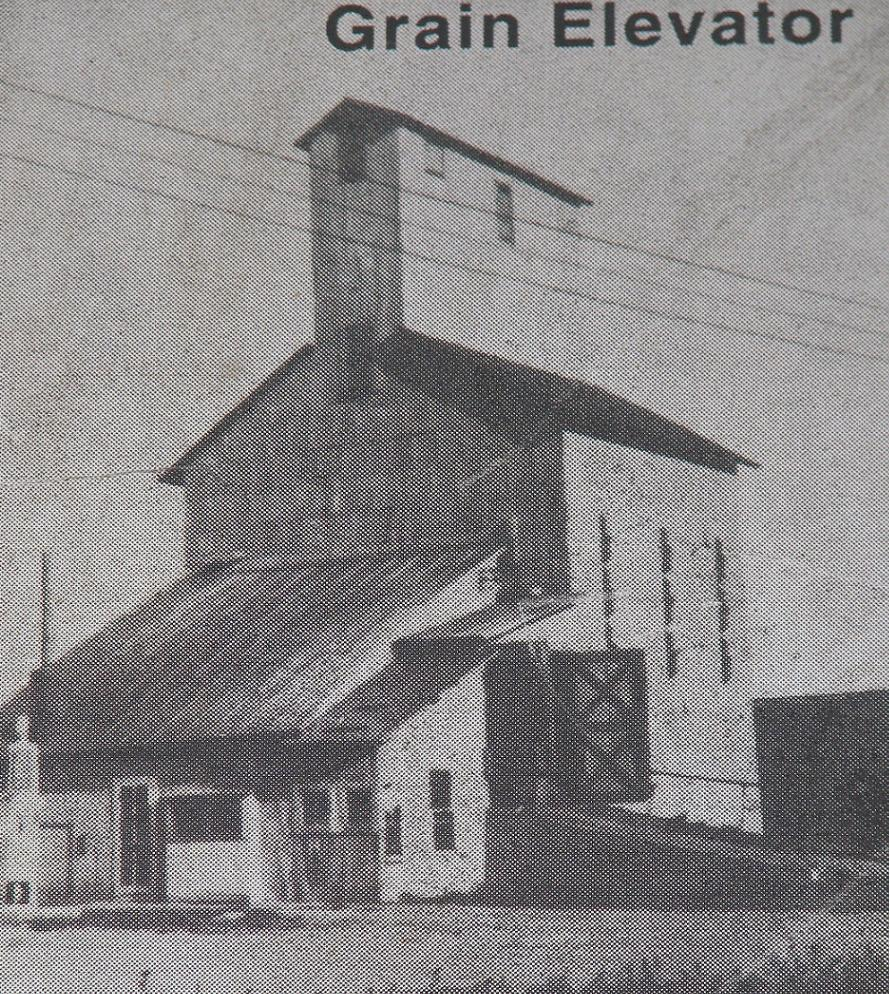
Kennedy Grain Elevator

“My interest in Kennedy Station is personal, for my childhood years were spent on a farm overlooking the area,” remarked Hazel Whitney of Redfield, Iowa.

The train was always extremely important to the little settlement. Hazel explained, “They unloaded a lot of grain in Kennedy. You have to remember Kennedy was a community without trucks, and you had to hitch up horses to wagons and haul the grain to market. I can remember when we rode the train to the State Fair in Des Moines because we didn’t have cars.”

Kennedy was a rural community and many memories touch upon that agricultural existence. Ruby Wicks remembered one particular incident: “My brother and three sisters were shocking in the field. It was a very hot day, 106 or 107 degrees, and we kept getting thirsty. We kept our water in a stone jar under a shock of oats to keep it cool. We were busy working while the train went through. The conductor saw us girls out there and he threw us each a piece of ice to put in our jar of water. We thought we were in heaven with ice-cold water to drink.”

— Ann Pearson, The Town That Almost Was, Wildrows, Vol.4, No.1 Spring 1981

=== Churches ===
The only organized church within the township is the Panther Creek Church of the Brethren. https://web.archive.org/web/20080511164917/http://www.panthercreekchurch.org/
https://www.facebook.com/Panther-Creek-Church-of-the-Brethren-142703549095548/

Minutes of the Council Meeting held by the Brethren of the Panther Creek Church, Dallas County, Iowa. ORGANIZATION OF THE CHURCH OF THE BRETHREN IN DALLAS COUNTY

    During the fall of the year 1869 a number of families of the Brethren from the different churches of Northern Illinois moved to (Dallas) County, Iowa. Sometime in the month of November of the year above named, the brothers and sisters that moved here, with those that lived here previous to that time, assembled at the house of Bro. Henry Stitzel in the city of Adel where an organization of the church was affected and called the Panther Creek Church ..."[6]

Some of the early Church Leaders (all deceased):
Elder Orlo E. Messamer - Elected to Ministry in 1910
Elder A.M. Stine
Elder J.B. Spurgeon
Elder L.A. Walker - Became a deacon in 1912. Elected to the Ministry in 1914. First pastor, 1938 to 1944
Pastor Paul E. Miller - Elected Pastor 1944 - 1964

== See also ==
- Dallas County, Iowa, county of Colfax Township
