= 2022 East High School shooting =

2022 shooting in Des Moines, Iowa

- Location: 41.5969°N 93.6°W; East High School (Des Moines, Iowa), U.S.
- Date: March 7, 2022
- Attack type: School shooting, gang violence (alleged), drive-by shooting
- Weapon: Firearms
- Deaths: 1
- Injuries: 2
- Assailants: 10 teenage males: Nyang Mai Chamdual, 14; Gumaro Marquez-Jacobo, 18; Braulio Hernandez-Salas, 17; Daniel Hernandez, 17; Kevin Isidro Martinez, 16; 5 other unidentified shooters
- Charges: First-degree murder, attempted murder (2 counts)

On March 7, 2022, after 2:40 pm, a shooting occurred within the vicinity of East High School in Des Moines, Iowa, U.S., right before school was dismissed for the day. At least 35 gunshots were fired out of at least three vehicles.

One 15-year-old boy was killed, and two female students were critically wounded. By the next few hours, six teenage males were arrested, ranging from ages 14 to 17, and charged with one count of first-degree murder and two counts of attempted murder: four charged in adult court, and two in juvenile court. Four more teens were eventually charged in connection to the shooting.

The shooting was described by police as having gang overtones, having stemmed from an ongoing violent conflict between two rival Iowa Hispanic gangs.

== Shooting ==
Around 2:40 p.m., neighborhood camera footage captured the shooting. Footage showed a group of five teenagers gathering near a curb when three vehicles passed by. The vehicles suddenly returned, with the occupants inside firing multiple shots at the group. Multiple 911 calls were then made at approximately 2:50 p.m.

Investigators recovered about 20 spent shell casings at the shooting site and found another 15 in the vehicles that the Des Moines Police Department said were used in the shooting.

== Investigation ==
The Bureau of Alcohol, Tobacco, Firearms and Explosives (ATF) of Kansas City arrived on the scene and provided assistance in the investigation. Other agencies assisting with the investigation included: the Iowa State Patrol (ISP), the Polk County Sheriff's Office, the FBI, and the Des Moines Public Schools Department of Public Safety. Multiple search warrants were executed, and six guns were recovered. By March 30, several teenagers were arrested in connection with the shooting.

=== Court proceedings ===
In September, one of the teens, Manuel Buezo, pleaded guilty to second-degree murder as part of a plea bargain. In October, Gumaro Marquez-Jacobo pleaded guilty to being an accessory to the fact, providing a pistol to a person under 21 and being a person ineligible to carry a dangerous weapon, and Henry David Valladares Amaya pleaded guilty to second-degree murder and two counts of willful injury causing a serious injury. In November, Kevin Martinez, one of the car drivers, after pleading guilty to two charges of intimidation with a dangerous weapon was sentenced to a total of 20 years in prison. In December, Daniel Hernandez pleaded guilty to second-degree murder and two counts of willful injury causing serious injury. In February 2023, Romeo Perdomo was sentenced to life with parole after pleading guilty to first degree murder. Also in February, Braulio Hernandez Salas pleaded guilty to two counts of intimidation with a dangerous weapon and was sentenced to 20 years in prison. In March, Alex Perdomo pleaded guilty to first degree murder and will be sentenced on October 17, 2024, when he turns 18. In July, Nyang Mai Chamdual pleaded guilty to first degree murder and was given youthful offender status and will be sentenced on June 18, 2025, after he turns 18. In August, Octavio Lopez Jr pleaded guilty to second-degree murder and two counts of willful injury. Later in August, Daniel Hernandez, Henry Amaya, Manuel Buezo and Gumaro Marquez-Jacobo were sentenced to 60 years, 50 years, 20 years and a suspended 4-year sentence respectively. In October, Lopez filed a motion to withdraw his plea which the judge denied and in January 2024, Lopez was sentenced to 70 years in prison and was ordered to pay $150,000 in restitution to the dead victims estate. In May 2025, Nyang Chamdual was sentenced to life in prison with the possibility of parole after pleading guilty to first degree murder.

== Victims ==
The victim killed was Jose David Lopez, a 15-year-old non-student of the school. He was a student of another Des Moines high school who was visiting the campus. Police say he was the intended target of the shooting, with the two female victims not intended targets, aged 16 and 18. The two female victims were both shot in the head and critically injured, and were students at the school. In a late March 2022 article by 12NewsNow, the 18-year-old victim (Kemery Ortega) hit in the head with a bullet was making a recovery, and was planning on leaving the hospital soon. She however still may have fragments or much of the bullet still lodged in her skull. The other girl wounded was also still critically injured as of late March but was on the mend.

== Aftermath ==
U.S. President Joe Biden released a statement regarding the shooting and the greater violence issue in American society.

== See also ==
- Perry High School Shooting, another school shooting that occurred in Iowa less than 2 years later.
- List of school shootings in the United States by death toll
