= Boone Township, Dallas County, Iowa =

Boone Township
- Township
- Location in Dallas County
- Coordinates: 41°33′28″N 093°50′49″W
- Country: United States
- State: Iowa
- County: Dallas

Area
  - Total: 35.39 sq mi (91.66 km^{2})
  - Land: 34.81 sq mi (90.15 km^{2})
  - Water: 0.58 sq mi (1.51 km^{2}) 1.65%
- Elevation: 873 ft (266 m)

Population (2000)
  - Total: 6,011
  - Density: 173/sq mi (66.7/km^{2})
- GNIS feature ID: 0467474

Boone Township is a township in Dallas County, Iowa, United States. As of the 2000 census, its population was 6,011.

== Geography ==
Boone Township covers an area of 35.39 square miles (91.7 km^{2}) and contains no incorporated settlements. According to the USGS, it contains three cemeteries: Booneville, Dale Moffit Reservoir and Huston.

Sugar Creek Lake is within this township. The streams of Fox Creek, Johnson Creek and Sugar Creek run through this township.
