= Van Meter Township, Dallas County, Iowa =

Van Meter Township
- Township
- Location in Dallas County
- Coordinates: 41°33′13″N 093°57′15″W
- Country: United States
- State: Iowa
- County: Dallas

Area
  - Total: 40.1 sq mi (103.9 km^{2})
  - Land: 39.59 sq mi (102.55 km^{2})
  - Water: 0.52 sq mi (1.34 km^{2}) 1.29%
- Elevation: 920 ft (280 m)

Population (2000)
  - Total: 3,061
  - Density: 77/sq mi (29.8/km^{2})
- GNIS feature ID: 0468859

Van Meter Township is a township in Dallas County, Iowa, United States. As of the 2000 census, its population was 3061.

== Geography ==
Van Meter Township covers an area of 40.11 square miles (103.9 km^{2}) and contains two incorporated settlements: De Soto and Van Meter. According to the USGS, it contains six cemeteries: Clayton, Oakland, Otterman, Thornton, Van Meter and Williams.

The streams of Bulger Creek, North Raccoon River and South Raccoon River run through this township.

== Transportation ==
Van Meter Township contains landing strip, Flying Green Acres Landing Strip.
