= Booneville, Iowa =

- Unincorporated community
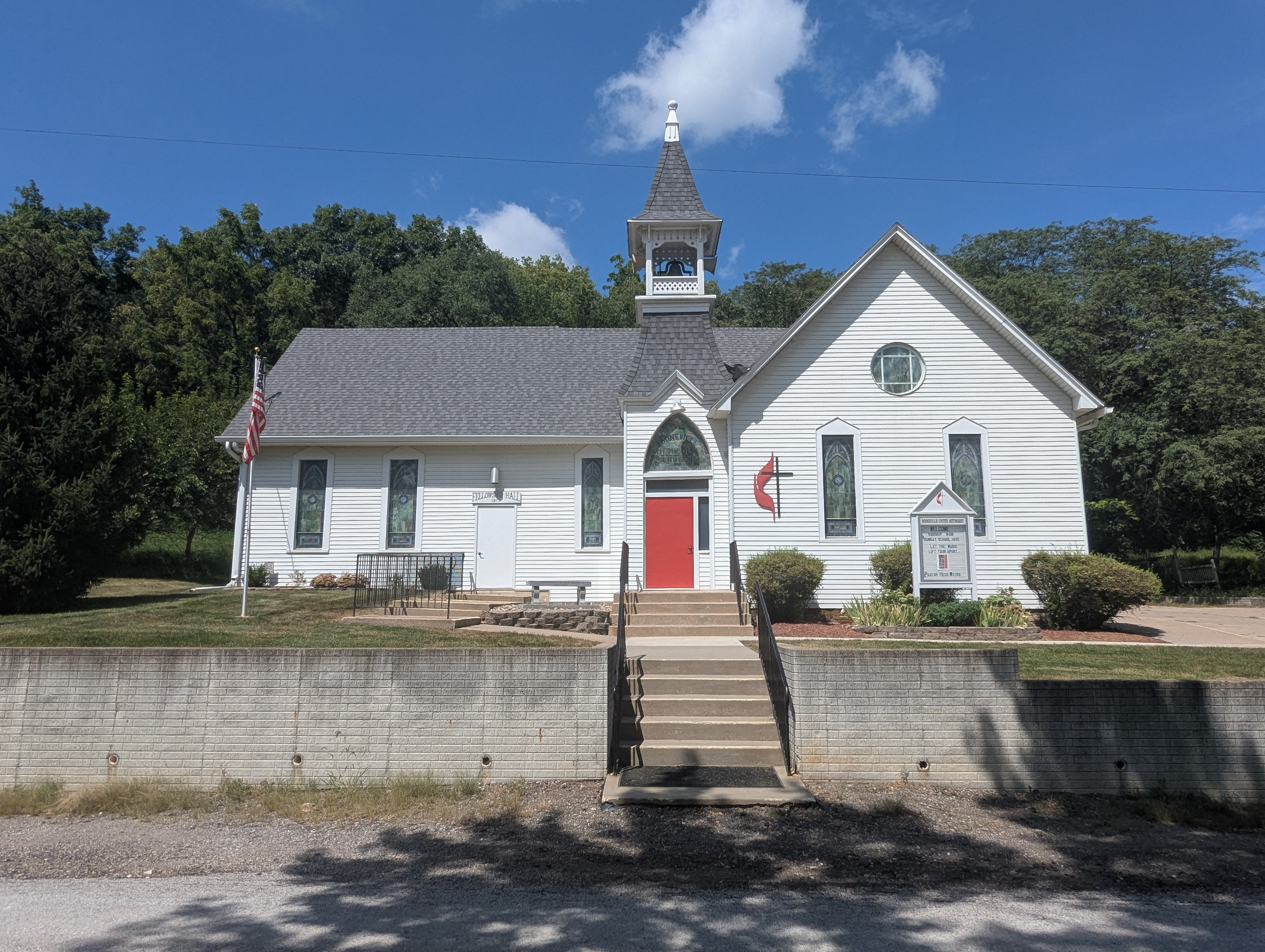
- United Methodist Church in Booneville

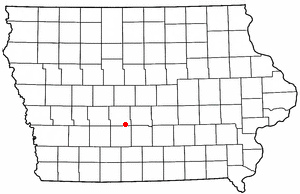
- Location of Booneville, Iowa
- Coordinates: 41°31′27″N 93°53′02″W
- Country: United States
- State: Iowa
- County: Dallas
- Elevation: 856 ft (261 m)
- Time zone: UTC-6 (Central (CST))
  - Summer (DST): UTC-5 (CDT)
- Area code: 515
- GNIS feature ID: 454758

Booneville is an unincorporated community in Dallas County, Iowa, United States. It is part of the Des Moines–West Des Moines Metropolitan Statistical Area.

== History ==
Booneville was laid out as a town in 1871 by surveyor A. J. Lyon. The community is named after the William and Susan Boone family, who were prominent local landowners. Early businesses in Booneville included a general store and post office, run by W. H. Baldwin, a drugstore, a hotel, two doctors, a blacksmith, a wagonmaker, and a stock dealer. The Methodist Episcopal Church was the first to hold services in town with a pastor who came from Van Meter.

The population was 62 in 1940.

Though once a thriving community, Booneville eventually saw a decline in population with reduced use of the local railroad as well as urban sprawl. The town of Booneville now comprises a restaurant and bar; a Methodist church; the United States Post Office for ZIP code 50038; and a small RV park (part of a mobile home community).

Booneville lies directly northeast of the Raccoon River, and a boat ramp near the town is used frequently.

Although Booneville lies in the annexation path of West Des Moines, situated only a few miles away to the east, West Des Moines officials have stated that there are no plans to annex Booneville in the near future.
