= Adel Township, Dallas County, Iowa =

Adel Township
- Township
- Location in Dallas County
- Coordinates: 41°37′54″N 093°59′27″W
- Country: United States
- State: Iowa
- County: Dallas

Area
  - Total: 36.59 sq mi (94.77 km^{2})
  - Land: 36.2 sq mi (93.8 km^{2})
  - Water: 0.37 sq mi (0.96 km^{2}) 1.01%
- Elevation: 920 ft (280 m)

Population (2000)
  - Total: 5,664
  - Density: 156/sq mi (60.4/km^{2})
- GNIS feature ID: 0467377

Adel Township is a township in Dallas County, Iowa, USA. As of the 2000 census, its population was 5,664.

== Geography ==
Adel Township covers an area of 36.59 square miles (94.8 km^{2}) and contains two incorporated settlements: Adel (the county seat) and Dallas Center. According to the USGS, it contains nine cemeteries: Dallas County Farm, Gibson, King, Kinnick, Masonic, Merical, Miller, Oakdale and Odd Fellows.

The streams of Hickory Creek and Mill Slough run through this township.

== Transportation ==
Adel Township contains one airport or landing strip, Husband Field.

== Churches ==
Minutes of the Council Meeting held by the Brethren of the Panther Creek Church, Dallas County, Iowa. ORGANIZATION OF THE CHURCH OF THE BRETHREN IN DALLAS COUNTY

    During the fall of the year 1869 a number of families of the Brethren from the different churches of Northern Illinois moved to this (Dallas) County, Iowa. Sometime in the month of November of the year above named, the brothers and sisters that moved here, with those that lived here previous to that time, assembled at the house of Bro. Henry Stitzel in the city of Adel where an organization of the church was affected and called the Panther Creek Church ..."[1]
