= Lincoln Township, Dallas County, Iowa =

Lincoln Township
- Township
- Location in Dallas County
- Coordinates: 41°43′28″N 094°13′48″W
- Country: United States
- State: Iowa
- County: Dallas

Area
  - Total: 36.78 sq mi (95.27 km^{2})
  - Land: 36.78 sq mi (95.27 km^{2})
  - Water: 0 sq mi (0 km^{2}) 0%
- Elevation: 1,027 ft (313 m)

Population (2000)
  - Total: 255
  - Density: 7.0/sq mi (2.7/km^{2})
- GNIS feature ID: 0468247

Lincoln Township is a township in Dallas County, Iowa, United States. As of the 2000 census, its population was 255.

== Geography ==
Lincoln Township covers an area of 36.79 square miles (95.3 km^{2}) and contains no incorporated settlements. According to the USGS, it contains one cemetery, Pleasant Hill.
