= Washington Township, Dallas County, Iowa =

Washington Township
- Township
- Location in Dallas County
- Coordinates: 41°43′38″N 094°06′44″W
- Country: United States
- State: Iowa
- County: Dallas

Area
  - Total: 36.58 sq mi (94.74 km^{2})
  - Land: 36.24 sq mi (93.86 km^{2})
  - Water: 0.34 sq mi (0.87 km^{2}) 0.92%
- Elevation: 997 ft (304 m)

Population (2000)
  - Total: 340
  - Density: 9.3/sq mi (3.6/km^{2})
- GNIS feature ID: 0468913

Washington Township is a township in Dallas County, Iowa, United States. As of the 2000 census, its population was 340.

== Geography ==
Washington Township covers an area of 36.58 square miles (94.7 km^{2}) and contains no incorporated settlements. According to the USGS, it contains two cemeteries: Jenkins and Myers.

== History ==
=== Panther Store ===
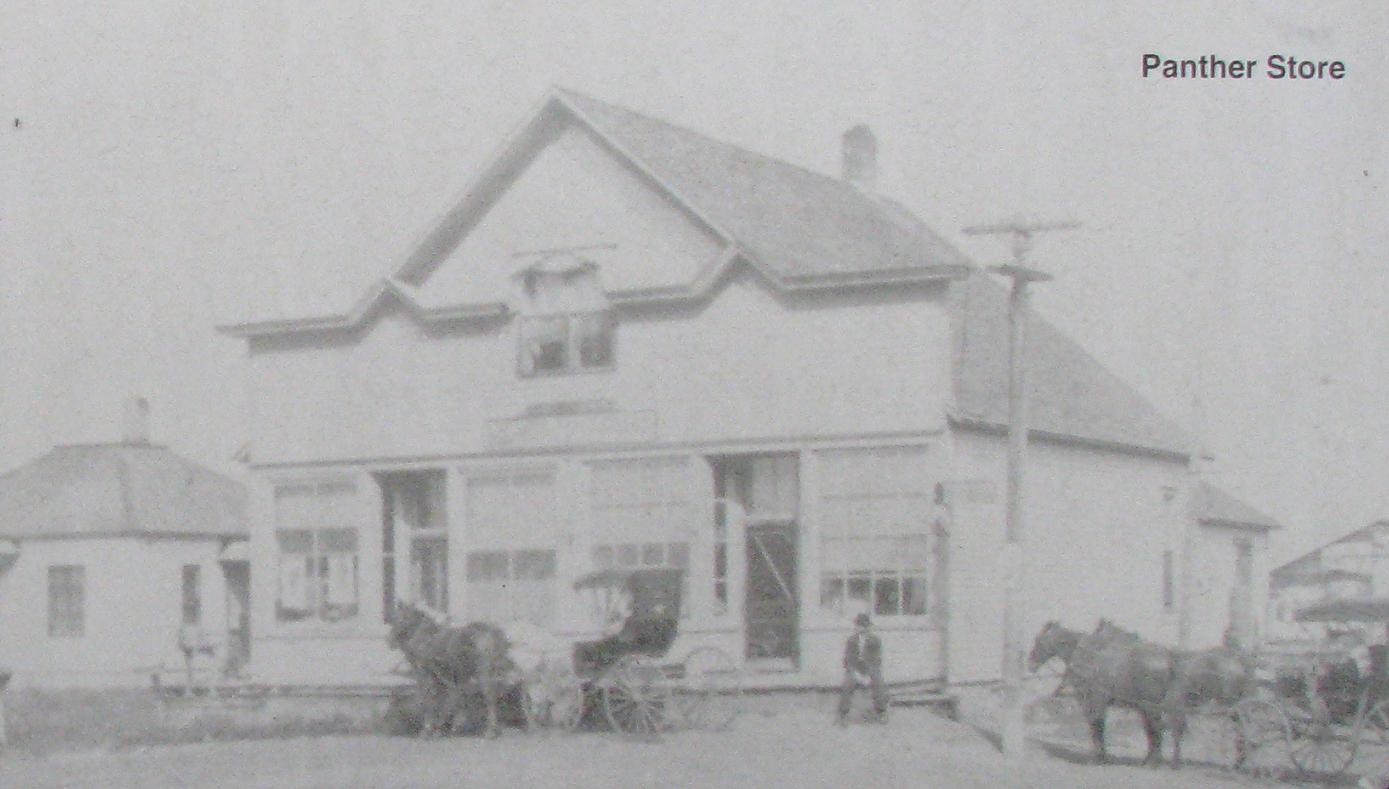
Panther Store 1928

On the south, Washington Township borders Colfax Township and the line running between the two follows Iowa Highway 44, which, at an earlier date, was known as the Panora Speedway. Sometime before 1900 a group of farmers formed a board and sold shares to build Panther Store on the northwest corner of the intersection (Today:Highway 44 and J Avenue), known as the Panther Co-operative Association. It was operated by Isarel Bever and it handled a variety of commodities.

On the northeast corner a blacksmith shop was built. On the southwest corner (Colfax Township), Will Bazor built a 'tin shop' to construct and repair windmills.

About 1934 John and Mart Sheaffer bought up all of the Co-operative association and became full owners of Panther Store. Rooms above the store, served as living quarters for the manager. The store became a popular place for farmers to congregate. On Saturday afternoons and on rainy days, the hitching racks filled up with teams as folks came for supplies. They bought groceries, dry goods, shoes, tobacco, kerosene, men's overalls and shirts, mittens, canned goods, shucking pegs, ammunition, and candy. Panther served as a produce store, buying poultry, eggs, cream, and butter. They took orders for buggy's, wagons, a variety of farm machinery, fencing materials, and furniture. These orders were shipped to Dallas Center and then hauled out by teams. When cars and trucks came more into use, they were used, instead of horse-drawn wagons to bring supplies from Des Moines. Motorized travel made it necessary to install a gasoline pump.

For a short while, a post office resided inside Panther store, where mail was held until picked up. Neighbors would sometimes fetch it for those nearby. Robert Bentall recalls having a regular pigeon-holed rack where he would hold mail for friends to pick up at his house.

Many good times were enjoyed by the men of the community as this (Panther Store) turned out to be quite a recreational center for them as they enjoyed ball games, wrestling, boxing and pulling square holds.
