= Walnut Township, Dallas County, Iowa =

Walnut Township
- Township
- Location in Dallas County
- Coordinates: 41°38′15″N 093°52′43″W
- Country: United States
- State: Iowa
- County: Dallas

Area
  - Total: 36.63 sq mi (94.86 km^{2})
  - Land: 36.62 sq mi (94.85 km^{2})
  - Water: 0.0039 sq mi (0.01 km^{2}) 0.01%
- Elevation: 1,020 ft (310 m)

Population (2000)
  - Total: 8,074
  - Density: 220/sq mi (85.1/km^{2})
- GNIS feature ID: 0468883

Walnut Township is a township in Dallas County, Iowa, United States. As of the 2000 census, its population was 8,074.

== Geography ==
Walnut Township covers an area of 36.62 square miles (94.8 km^{2}) and contains one incorporated settlement, Waukee. According to the USGS, it contains two cemeteries: Hoff and Waukee.

The stream of Little Walnut Creek runs through this township.

== Transportation ==
Walnut Township contains one airport or landing strip, Robel Field.
