= Zook Spur, Iowa =

- former unincorporated community
- Location within Iowa
- Coordinates: 41°50′31″N 93°48′56″W
- Country: United States
- State: Iowa
- County: Dallas and Polk
- Elevation: 948 ft (289 m)
- Time zone: UTC-6 (Central (CST))
  - Summer (DST): UTC-5 (CDT)
- GNIS feature ID: 463290

Zook Spur is a former unincorporated community that was on the border of Dallas County and Polk County, in the U.S. state of Iowa. It was at the corner of what is now NW 158th Avenue and Iowa Highway 17.

== History ==
Zook Spur (or Zookspur) was a mining community and named after mining superintendent H. Zook. The Scandia Coal Company operated six mines in the area between 1906 and 1943.

Zook Spur was a company town, however it had a school, churches, a baseball diamond, a pool hall, a bakery, and a company store. The town was located on the Milwaukee Railroad. Zook Spur's population was 520 in 1925. A number of cabins were on Zook Spur Place, south of the main intersection. Zook Spur prospered into the 1930s. The 1943 closure of the mines ended Zook Spur's growth.

In 1948, the Zook Spur school district closed and the school building was put up for sale. By 1975, little remained of the original community, aside from a few houses and the building where the Zook Spur bakery was located.
