= Linden, Iowa =

- City
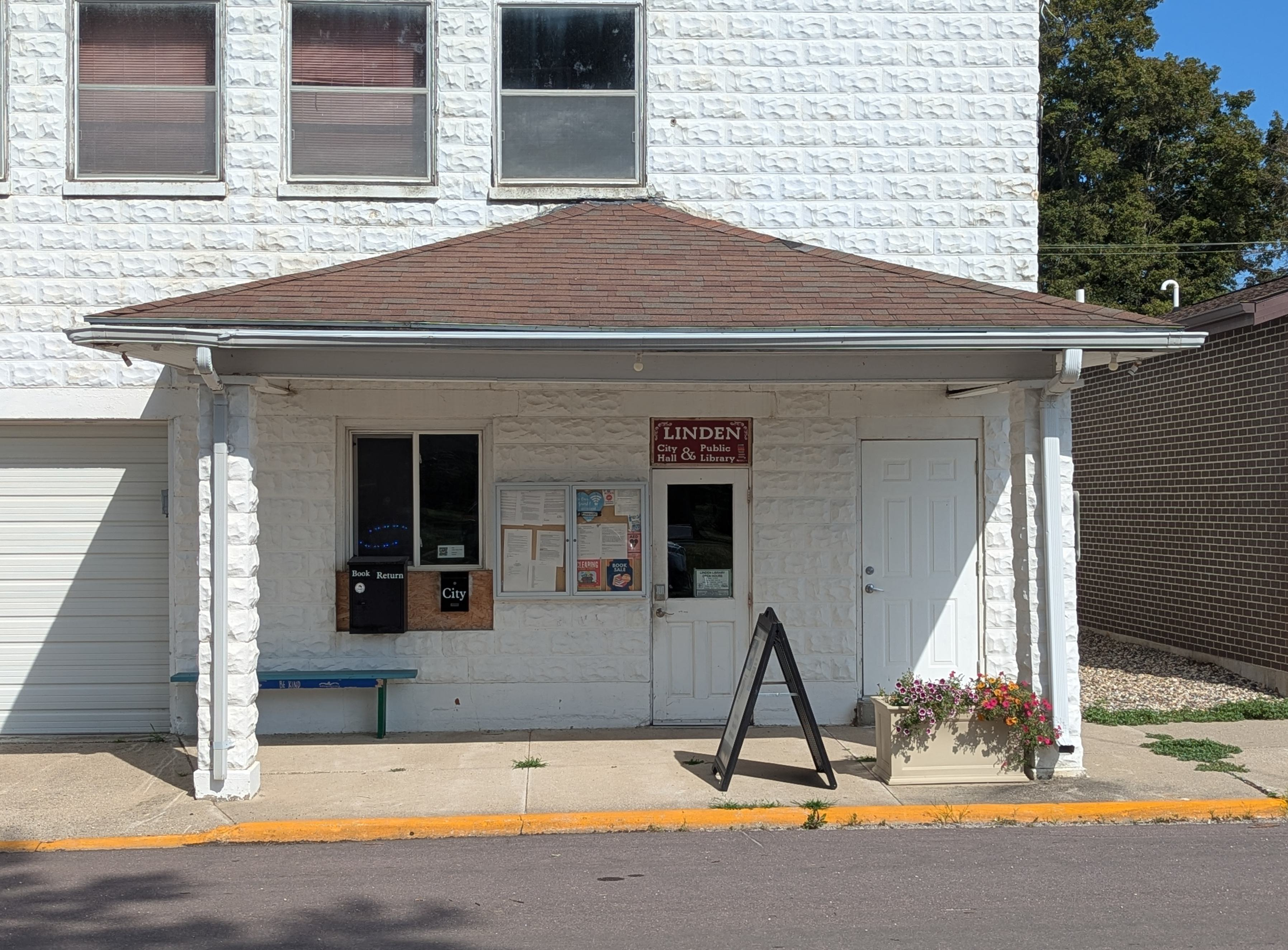
- City Hall and Library

- Location of Linden, Iowa
- Coordinates: 41°38′34″N 94°16′12″W
- Country: United States
- State: Iowa
- County: Dallas
- Incorporated: January 12, 1893

Area
  - Total: 0.78 sq mi (2.03 km^{2})
  - Land: 0.78 sq mi (2.03 km^{2})
  - Water: 0 sq mi (0.00 km^{2})
- Elevation: 1,129 ft (344 m)

Population (2020)
  - Total: 200
  - Density: 255.6/sq mi (98.68/km^{2})
- Time zone: UTC−6 (Central (CST))
  - Summer (DST): UTC−5 (CDT)
- ZIP Code: 50146
- Area code: 641
- FIPS code: 19-45390
- GNIS feature ID: 2395716
- Website: cityoflinden.com

Linden is a city in Dallas County, Iowa, United States. The population was 226 in the 2000 census and 200 at the time of the 2020 census. It is part of the Des Moines–West Des Moines Metropolitan Statistical Area.

== Geography ==
According to the United States Census Bureau, the city has a total area of 0.79 square miles (2.05 km^{2}), all land.

== Demographics ==
Historical populations
Year	Pop.	±%
1900	314	—
1910	315	+0.3%
1920	267	−15.2%
1930	314	+17.6%
1940	298	−5.1%
1950	290	−2.7%
1960	258	−11.0%
1970	278	+7.8%
1980	264	−5.0%
1990	201	−23.9%
2000	226	+12.4%
2010	199	−11.9%
2020	200	+0.5%
Source:"U.S. Census website". United States Census Bureau. and Iowa Data Center; Source: U.S. Decennial Census

=== 2020 census ===
As of the census of 2020, there were 200 people, 79 households, and 60 families residing in the city. The population density was 255.6 inhabitants per square mile (98.7/km^{2}). There were 88 housing units at an average density of 112.5 per square mile (43.4/km^{2}). The racial makeup of the city was 93.5% White, 0.0% Black or African American, 0.0% Native American, 0.0% Asian, 0.0% Pacific Islander, 1.0% from other races and 5.5% from two or more races. Hispanic or Latino persons of any race comprised 6.5% of the population.

Of the 79 households, 34.2% of which had children under the age of 18 living with them, 48.1% were married couples living together, 6.3% were cohabitating couples, 26.6% had a female householder with no spouse or partner present and 19.0% had a male householder with no spouse or partner present. 24.1% of all households were non-families. 17.7% of all households were made up of individuals, 5.1% had someone living alone who was 65 years old or older.

The median age in the city was 43.5 years. 24.5% of the residents were under the age of 20; 6.0% were between the ages of 20 and 24; 21.0% were from 25 and 44; 28.0% were from 45 and 64; and 20.5% were 65 years of age or older. The gender makeup of the city was 50.0% male and 50.0% female.

=== 2010 census ===
As of the census of 2010, there were 199 people, 84 households, and 58 families living in the city. The population density was 251.9 inhabitants per square mile (97.3/km^{2}). There were 92 housing units at an average density of 116.5 per square mile (45.0/km^{2}). The racial makeup of the city was 99.0% White, 0.5% African American, and 0.5% Pacific Islander. Hispanic or Latino of any race were 1.0% of the population.

There were 84 households, of which 26.2% had children under the age of 18 living with them, 58.3% were married couples living together, 6.0% had a female householder with no husband present, 4.8% had a male householder with no wife present, and 31.0% were non-families. Of all households, 23.8% were made up of individuals, and 13.1% had someone living alone who was 65 years of age or older. The average household size was 2.37 and the average family size was 2.81.

The median age in the city was 44.4 years. 23.1% of residents were under the age of 18; 4.9% were between the ages of 18 and 24; 23.5% were from 25 to 44; 33.6% were from 45 to 64; and 14.6% were 65 years of age or older. The gender makeup of the city was 58.3% male and 41.7% female.

=== 2000 census ===
As of the census of 2000, there were 226 people, 91 households, and 74 families living in the city. The population density was 286.1 inhabitants per square mile (110.5/km^{2}). There were 101 housing units at an average density of 127.9 per square mile (49.4/km^{2}). The racial makeup of the city was 99.12% White, and 0.88% from two or more races.

There were 91 households, out of which 31.9% had children under the age of 18 living with them, 73.6% were married couples living together, 4.4% had a female householder with no husband present, and 17.6% were non-families. Of all households, 16.5% were made up of individuals, and 8.8% had someone living alone who was 65 years of age or older. The average household size was 2.48 and the average family size was 2.77.

In the city, the population was spread out, with 23.9% under the age of 18, 5.8% from 18 to 24, 26.5% from 25 to 44, 25.7% from 45 to 64, and 18.1% who were 65 years of age or older. The median age was 40 years. For every 100 females, there were 115.2 males. For every 100 females age 18 and over, there were 97.7 males.

The median income for a household in the city was $32,500, and the median income for a family was $32,917. Males had a median income of $29,821 versus $21,354 for females. The per capita income for the city was $14,392. About 6.7% of families and 4.8% of the population were below the poverty line, including none of those under the age of eighteen and 13.8% of those 65 or over.

== Arts and culture ==
Linden Daze is a festival held on the third weekend in August, and includes a parade and street dance.

== Parks and recreation ==
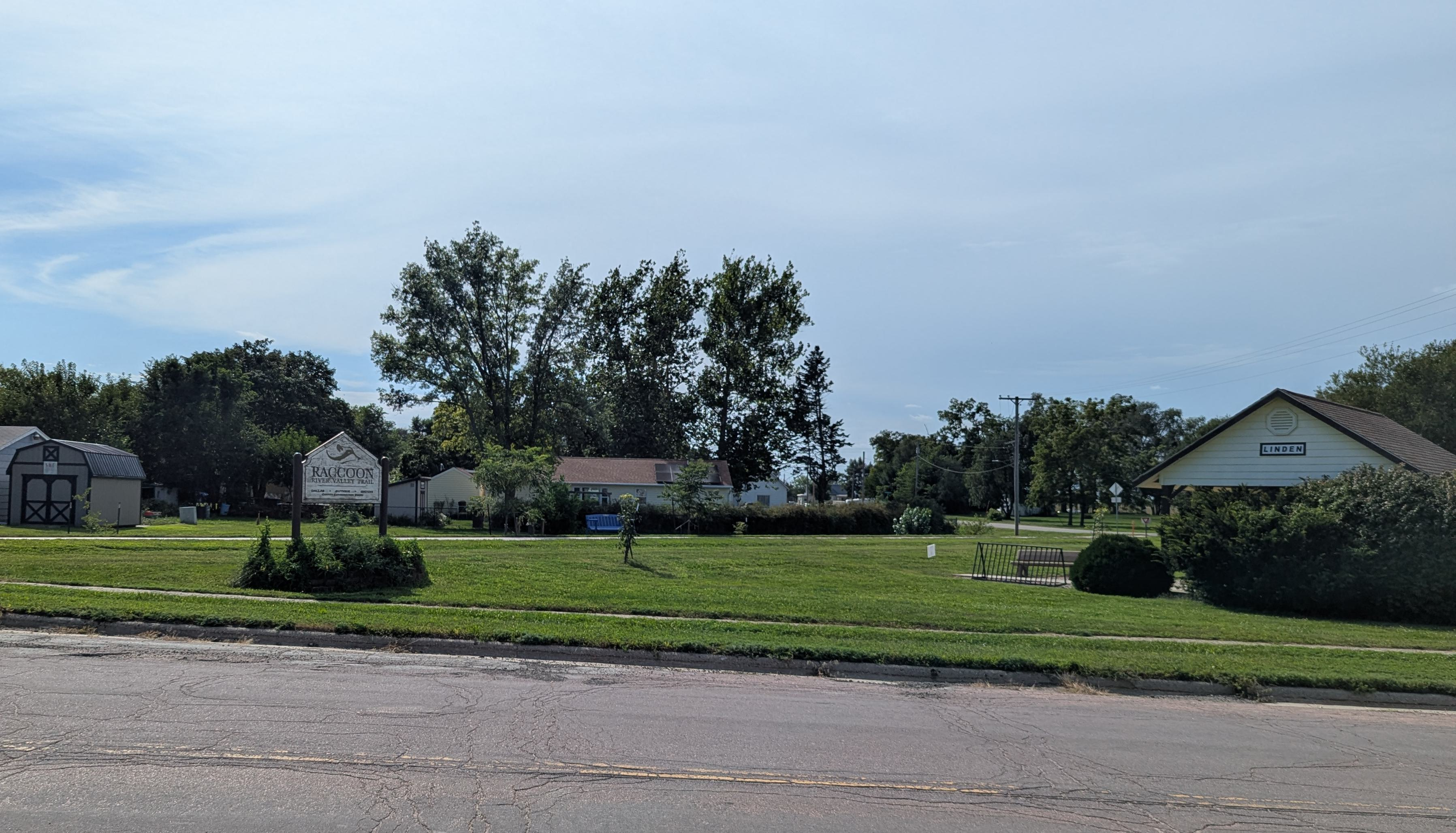
The Raccoon River Valley Trail passing through Linden

Linden has a park, community building, and baseball field.

== Government ==
Thomas Kauzlarich has been the mayor since 2019 when he was elected to a four-year term which will end in 2023. Prior to him, Dave Hutchins was the mayor beginning in 2009 and, prior to Dave Hutchins, Albert Daggett was the mayor.

== Education ==
Panorama Community School District serves the community. The district formed on July 1, 1989 as a merger of the Panora-Linden and Y-J-B school districts. The school buildings are in Panora.
