= Bouton, Iowa =

- City
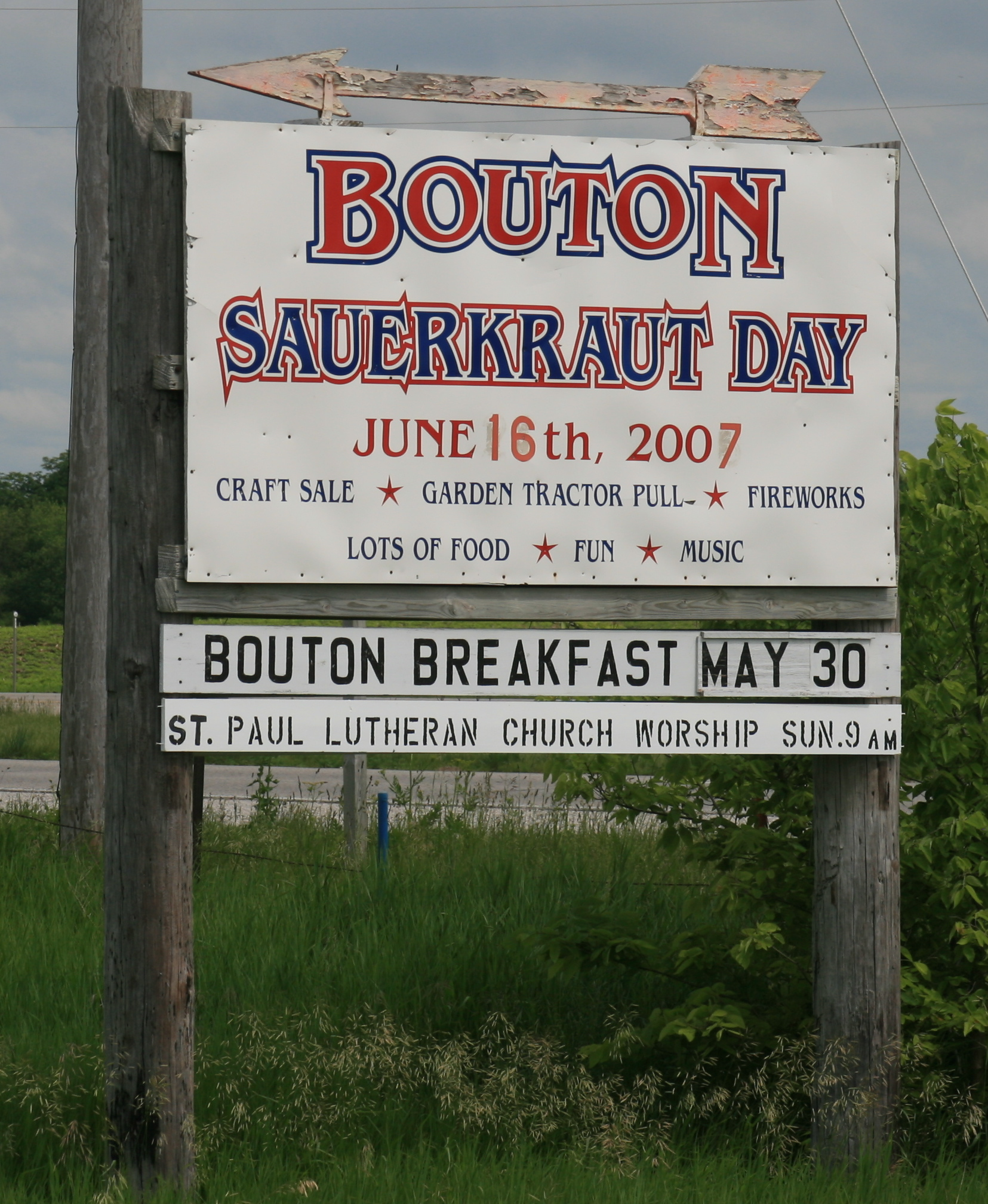
- Welcome sign for Bouton

- Location of Bouton, Iowa
- Coordinates: 41°51′04″N 94°00′38″W
- Country: US
- State: Iowa
- County: Dallas

Area
  - Total: 0.11 sq mi (0.28 km^{2})
  - Land: 0.11 sq mi (0.28 km^{2})
  - Water: 0 sq mi (0.00 km^{2})
- Elevation: 942 ft (287 m)

Population (2020)
  - Total: 127
  - Density: 1,181.4/sq mi (456.16/km^{2})
- Time zone: UTC-6 (Central (CST))
  - Summer (DST): UTC-5 (CDT)
- ZIP code: 50039
- Area code: 515
- FIPS code: 19-07660
- GNIS feature ID: 2394226
- Website: boutoniowa.org

Bouton is a city in Dallas County, Iowa, United States. The population was 127 at the 2020 census. It is part of the Des Moines–West Des Moines Metropolitan Statistical Area.

== Geography ==
According to the United States Census Bureau, the city has a total area of 0.14 square miles (0.36 km^{2}), all land.

== Demographics ==
Historical populations
Year	Pop.	±%
1920	187	—
1930	141	−24.6%
1940	162	+14.9%
1950	159	−1.9%
1960	145	−8.8%
1970	160	+10.3%
1980	139	−13.1%
1990	149	+7.2%
2000	136	−8.7%
2010	129	−5.1%
2020	127	−1.6%
Source:"U.S. Census website". United States Census Bureau. and Iowa Data Center; Source: U.S. Decennial Census

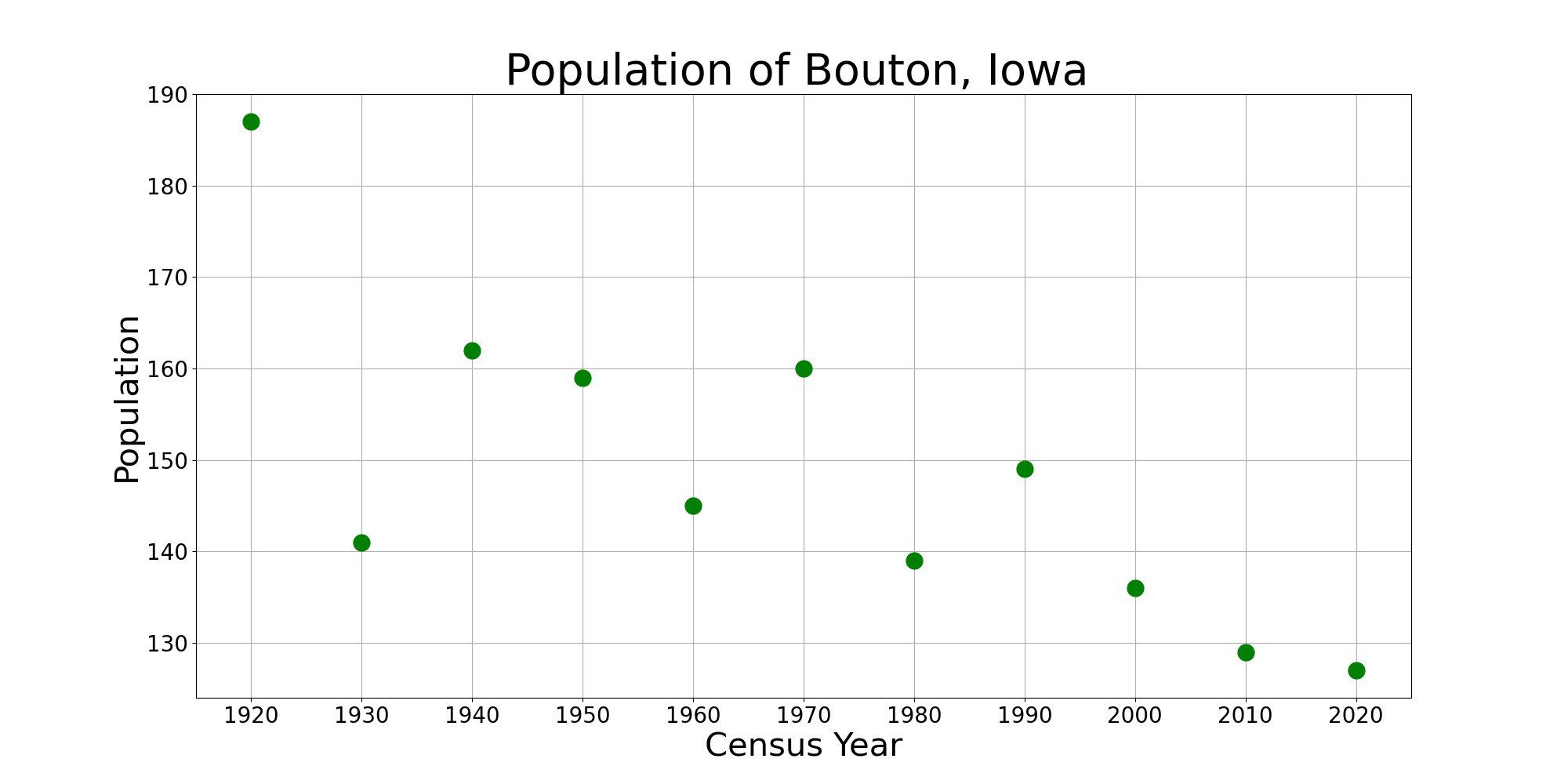
The population of Bouton, Iowa from US census data

=== 2020 census ===
As of the census of 2020, there were 127 people, 55 households, and 32 families residing in the city. The population density was 1,181.5 inhabitants per square mile (456.2/km^{2}). There were 61 housing units at an average density of 567.5 per square mile (219.1/km^{2}). The racial makeup of the city was 87.4% White, 0.0% Black or African American, 0.0% Native American, 0.0% Asian, 0.0% Pacific Islander, 0.8% from other races and 11.8% from two or more races. Hispanic or Latino persons of any race comprised 0.0% of the population.

Of the 55 households, 40.0% of which had children under the age of 18 living with them, 36.4% were married couples living together, 7.3% were cohabitating couples, 34.5% had a female householder with no spouse or partner present and 21.8% had a male householder with no spouse or partner present. 41.8% of all households were non-families. 34.5% of all households were made up of individuals, 10.9% had someone living alone who was 65 years old or older.

The median age in the city was 35.5 years. 29.9% of the residents were under the age of 20; 5.5% were between the ages of 20 and 24; 25.2% were from 25 and 44; 18.9% were from 45 and 64; and 20.5% were 65 years of age or older. The gender makeup of the city was 50.4% male and 49.6% female.

=== 2010 census ===
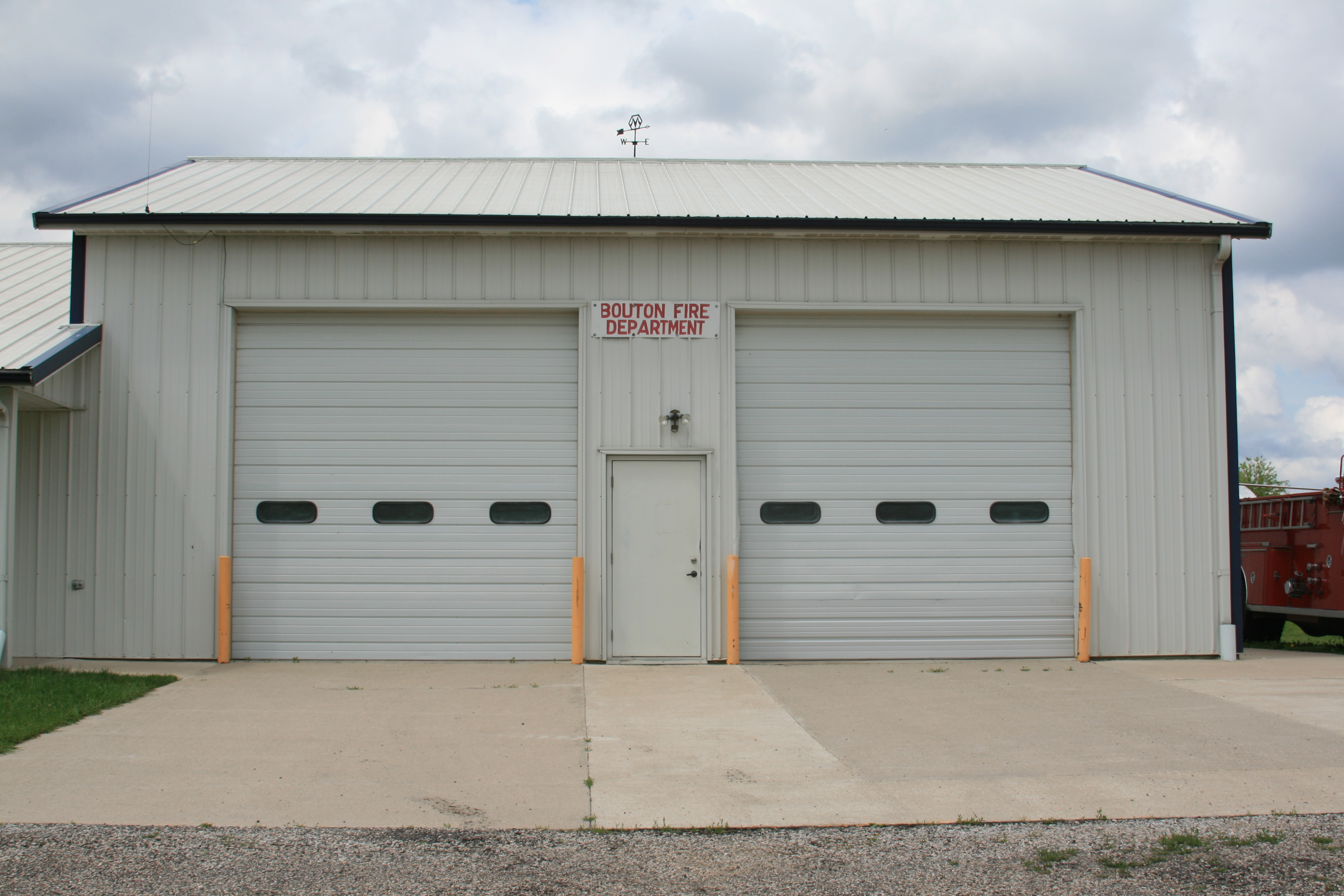
Bouton fire station

As of the census of 2010, there were 129 people, 57 households, and 33 families living in the city. The population density was 921.4 inhabitants per square mile (355.8/km^{2}). There were 63 housing units at an average density of 450.0 per square mile (173.7/km^{2}). The racial makeup of the city was 98.4% White, 0.8% Native American, and 0.8% from two or more races.

There were 57 households, of which 22.8% had children under the age of 18 living with them, 35.1% were married couples living together, 15.8% had a female householder with no husband present, 7.0% had a male householder with no wife present, and 42.1% were non-families. 29.8% of all households were made up of individuals, and 8.8% had someone living alone who was 65 years of age or older. The average household size was 2.26 and the average family size was 2.79.

The median age in the city was 45.5 years. 20.9% of residents were under the age of 18; 9.3% were between the ages of 18 and 24; 19.4% were from 25 to 44; 39.6% were from 45 to 64; and 10.9% were 65 years of age or older. The gender makeup of the city was 55.0% male and 45.0% female.

=== 2000 census ===
As of the census of 2000, there were 136 people, 59 households, and 38 families living in the city. The population density was 971.3 inhabitants per square mile (375.0/km^{2}). There were 61 housing units at an average density of 435.7 per square mile (168.2/km^{2}). The racial makeup of the city was 94.85% White, 0.74% African American, 0.74% Asian, and 3.68% from two or more races.

There were 59 households, out of which 28.8% had children under the age of 18 living with them, 45.8% were married couples living together, 11.9% had a female householder with no husband present, and 33.9% were non-families. 27.1% of all households were made up of individuals, and 8.5% had someone living alone who was 65 years of age or older. The average household size was 2.31 and the average family size was 2.69.

In the city, the population was spread out, with 22.1% under the age of 18, 8.8% from 18 to 24, 31.6% from 25 to 44, 25.0% from 45 to 64, and 12.5% who were 65 years of age or older. The median age was 38 years. For every 100 females, there were 109.2 males. For every 100 females age 18 and over, there were 100.0 males.

The median income for a household in the city was $34,688, and the median income for a family was $43,125. Males had a median income of $23,750 versus $22,250 for females. The per capita income for the city was $17,778. There were no families and 6.7% of the population living below the poverty line, including no under eighteens and 15.0% of those over 64.

== Education ==
The Perry Community School District operates local area public schools.

== See also ==
- Sports Illustrated 40th Anniversary Swimsuit Special: American Beauty (2004)
