= Dawson, Iowa =

- City
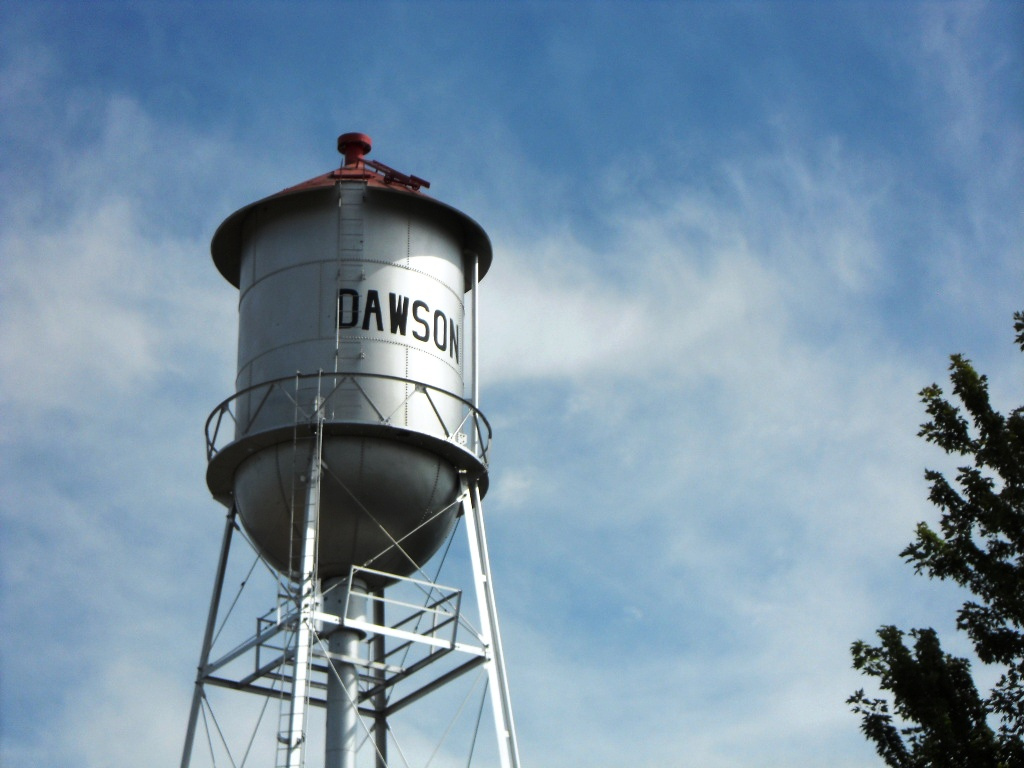
- Dawson Water Tower

- Location of Dawson, Iowa
- Coordinates: 41°50′35″N 94°13′13″W
- Country: USA
- State: Iowa
- County: Dallas

Area
  - Total: 0.49 sq mi (1.28 km^{2})
  - Land: 0.49 sq mi (1.28 km^{2})
  - Water: 0 sq mi (0.00 km^{2})
- Elevation: 1,037 ft (316 m)

Population (2020)
  - Total: 116
  - Density: 234.4/sq mi (90.51/km^{2})
- Time zone: UTC-6 (Central (CST))
  - Summer (DST): UTC-5 (CDT)
- ZIP code: 50066
- Area code: 515
- FIPS code: 19-19135
- GNIS feature ID: 2394470

Dawson is a city in Dallas County, Iowa, United States. The population was 116 at the time of the 2020 census. It is part of the Des Moines–West Des Moines Metropolitan Statistical Area.

== Geography ==
According to the United States Census Bureau, the city has a total area of 0.48 square miles (1.24 km^{2}), all land.

== Demographics ==
Historical populations
Year	Pop.	±%
1910	275	—
1920	300	+9.1%
1930	262	−12.7%
1940	289	+10.3%
1950	286	−1.0%
1960	257	−10.1%
1970	232	−9.7%
1980	229	−1.3%
1990	174	−24.0%
2000	155	−10.9%
2010	131	−15.5%
2020	116	−11.5%
Source:"U.S. Census website". United States Census Bureau. and Iowa Data Center; Source: U.S. Decennial Census

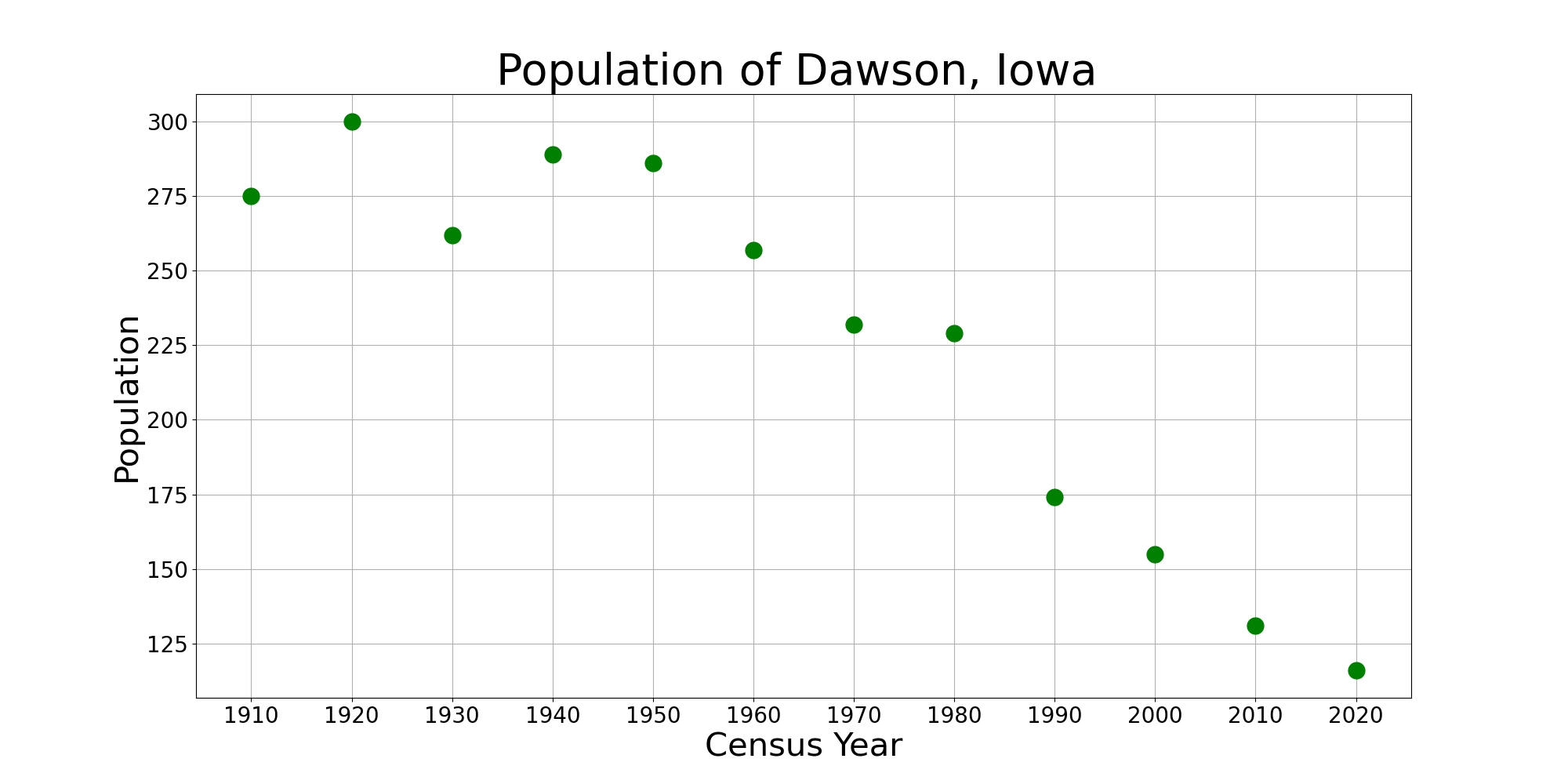
The population of Dawson, Iowa from US census data

=== 2020 census ===
As of the census of 2020, there were 116 people, 42 households, and 28 families residing in the city. The population density was 234.4 inhabitants per square mile (90.5/km^{2}). There were 54 housing units at an average density of 109.1 per square mile (42.1/km^{2}). The racial makeup of the city was 88.8% White, 0.0% Black or African American, 1.7% Native American, 0.9% Asian, 0.0% Pacific Islander, 2.6% from other races and 6.0% from two or more races. Hispanic or Latino persons of any race comprised 6.0% of the population.

Of the 42 households, 40.5% of which had children under the age of 18 living with them, 45.2% were married couples living together, 16.7% were cohabitating couples, 9.5% had a female householder with no spouse or partner present and 28.6% had a male householder with no spouse or partner present. 33.3% of all households were non-families. 14.3% of all households were made up of individuals, 7.1% had someone living alone who was 65 years old or older.

The median age in the city was 34.5 years. 27.6% of the residents were under the age of 20; 4.3% were between the ages of 20 and 24; 30.2% were from 25 and 44; 25.0% were from 45 and 64; and 12.9% were 65 years of age or older. The gender makeup of the city was 55.2% male and 44.8% female.

=== 2010 census ===
As of the census of 2010, there were 131 people, 52 households, and 33 families living in the city. The population density was 272.9 inhabitants per square mile (105.4/km^{2}). There were 63 housing units at an average density of 131.3 per square mile (50.7/km^{2}). The racial makeup of the city was 93.1% White, 0.8% African American, 1.5% from other races, and 4.6% from two or more races. Hispanic or Latino of any race were 4.6% of the population.

There were 52 households, of which 38.5% had children under the age of 18 living with them, 51.9% were married couples living together, 5.8% had a female householder with no husband present, 5.8% had a male householder with no wife present, and 36.5% were non-families. 32.7% of all households were made up of individuals, and 9.6% had someone living alone who was 65 years of age or older. The average household size was 2.52 and the average family size was 3.27.

The median age in the city was 37.3 years. 31.3% of residents were under the age of 18; 9.2% were between the ages of 18 and 24; 21.3% were from 25 to 44; 23.7% were from 45 to 64; and 14.5% were 65 years of age or older. The gender makeup of the city was 54.2% male and 45.8% female.

=== 2000 census ===
As of the census of 2000, there were 155 people, 60 households, and 48 families living in the city. The population density was 324.2 inhabitants per square mile (125.2/km^{2}). There were 67 housing units at an average density of 140.1 per square mile (54.1/km^{2}). The racial makeup of the city was 96.13% White, 1.29% from other races, and 2.58% from two or more races. Hispanic or Latino of any race were 1.29% of the population.

There were 60 households, out of which 36.7% had children under the age of 18 living with them, 61.7% were married couples living together, 6.7% had a female householder with no husband present, and 20.0% were non-families. 16.7% of all households were made up of individuals, and 6.7% had someone living alone who was 65 years of age or older. The average household size was 2.58 and the average family size was 2.90.

In the city, the population was spread out, with 29.7% under the age of 18, 5.8% from 18 to 24, 28.4% from 25 to 44, 21.9% from 45 to 64, and 14.2% who were 65 years of age or older. The median age was 35 years. For every 100 females, there were 106.7 males. For every 100 females age 18 and over, there were 113.7 males.

The median income for a household in the city was $38,750, and the median income for a family was $45,250. Males had a median income of $28,750 versus $25,417 for females. The per capita income for the city was $13,524. None of the families and 2.4% of the population were living below the poverty line.

== Government ==
Colton Morman, who was 18 at the time, won the 2009 election for mayor of Dawson with 29 votes or 53.7 percent.

Breanna Morman, who was 22 at the time, won the 2011 election for Mayor of Dawson.

== Education ==
The Perry Community School District operates local area public schools.

== See also ==
- Raccoon River Valley Trail
