= Xenia, Dallas County, Iowa =

Unincorporated community in Iowa, U.S.

Xenia, Iowa
- Unincorporated community
- Location within Iowa
- Coordinates: 41°51′25″N 93°53′36″W
- Country: United States
- State: Iowa
- County: Dallas
- Elevation: 1,027 ft (313 m)
- Time zone: UTC-6 (Central (CST))
  - Summer (DST): UTC-5 (CDT)
- Area code: 515
- GNIS feature ID: 464207

Xenia (/ˈziːniə/ ZEE-nee-ə) is an unincorporated community in Dallas County, Iowa, United States. Xenia is 1.5 miles (2.4 km) east of Woodward.

In 1879, Xenia contained a post office, a blacksmith shop, and a schoolhouse.
