= Perry, Iowa =

- City
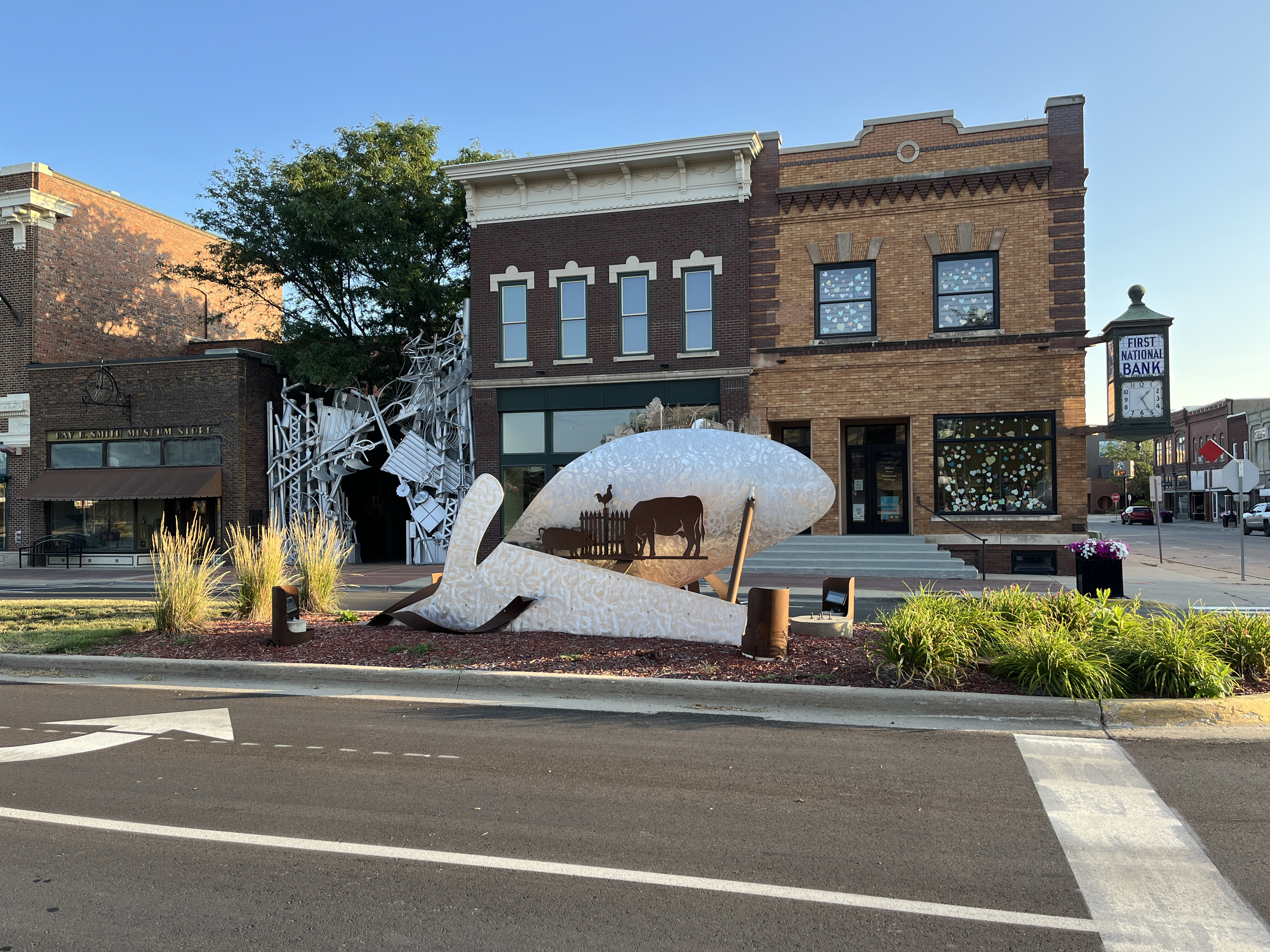
- Downtown Perry in 2024
- Motto: Make yourself at home!
- Location of Perry, Iowa
- Coordinates: 41°50′27″N 94°06′35″W
- Country: United States
- State: Iowa
- County: Dallas

Area
  - Total: 5.49 sq mi (14.22 km^{2})
  - Land: 5.49 sq mi (14.21 km^{2})
  - Water: 0.0039 sq mi (0.01 km^{2})
- Elevation: 994 ft (303 m)

Population (2020)
  - Total: 7,836
  - Density: 1,428.3/sq mi (551.47/km^{2})
- Time zone: UTC-6 (Central (CST))
  - Summer (DST): UTC-5 (CDT)
- ZIP code: 50220
- Area code: 515
- FIPS code: 19-62355
- GNIS feature ID: 2396183
- Website: www.perryia.org

Perry is a city in Dallas County, Iowa, United States, along the North Raccoon River. The population was 7,836 at the time of the 2020 Census. It is part of the Des Moines metropolitan area.

== History ==
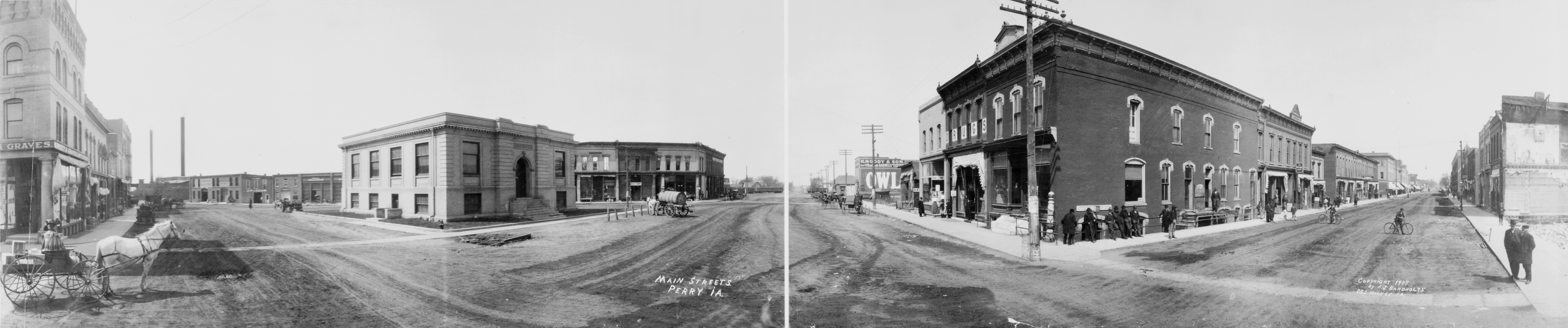
Panorama of Perry in 1907

Perry was laid out as a town in 1869, named for "one of the owners of the road at that time. Col. Perry, of Keokuk". The original town site was bounded by Estella Street on the south, 8th Street on the east, 3rd Street on the west, and Dewey Avenue on the north.

On January 4, 2024, a school shooting occurred at Perry High School leaving an 11-year-old boy in sixth grade dead and seven other people injured. The 17-year-old male shooter was found dead from a self-inflicted gunshot wound shortly after the shooting. The high school principal Dan Marburger, wounded critically after having spoken to the shooter trying to gain time for escaping students, died of his gun shot wounds, state governor Kim Reynolds announced on January 14. The governor praised his courage and ordered all flags in Iowa to be flown at half-staff from January 14 until sunset on the day of his funeral and interment.

== Geography ==
According to the United States Census Bureau, the city has a total area of 4.18 square miles (10.83 km^{2}), of which 4.17 square miles (10.80 km^{2}) is land and 0.01 square miles (0.03 km^{2}) is water.

=== Climate ===
According to the Köppen Climate Classification system, Perry has a hot-summer humid continental climate, abbreviated "Dfa" on climate maps.

Climate data for Perry, Iowa, 1991–2020 normals, extremes 1900–present
Month	Jan	Feb	Mar	Apr	May	Jun	Jul	Aug	Sep	Oct	Nov	Dec	Year
Record high °F (°C)	67 (19)	76 (24)	89 (32)	95 (35)	105 (41)	105 (41)	110 (43)	111 (44)	104 (40)	95 (35)	83 (28)	73 (23)	111 (44)
Mean maximum °F (°C)	51.7 (10.9)	56.9 (13.8)	72.4 (22.4)	83.3 (28.5)	89.2 (31.8)	93.1 (33.9)	95.0 (35.0)	93.8 (34.3)	90.7 (32.6)	84.3 (29.1)	69.9 (21.1)	56.1 (13.4)	96.9 (36.1)
Mean daily maximum °F (°C)	29.5 (−1.4)	34.0 (1.1)	47.5 (8.6)	61.3 (16.3)	71.9 (22.2)	81.9 (27.7)	85.4 (29.7)	83.3 (28.5)	77.1 (25.1)	64.0 (17.8)	47.8 (8.8)	35.0 (1.7)	59.9 (15.5)
Daily mean °F (°C)	19.8 (−6.8)	24.1 (−4.4)	36.6 (2.6)	49.0 (9.4)	60.5 (15.8)	70.9 (21.6)	74.5 (23.6)	72.1 (22.3)	64.3 (17.9)	51.5 (10.8)	37.3 (2.9)	25.7 (−3.5)	48.9 (9.4)
Mean daily minimum °F (°C)	10.2 (−12.1)	14.1 (−9.9)	25.8 (−3.4)	36.7 (2.6)	49.0 (9.4)	59.8 (15.4)	63.5 (17.5)	60.8 (16.0)	51.5 (10.8)	39.1 (3.9)	26.8 (−2.9)	16.5 (−8.6)	37.8 (3.2)
Mean minimum °F (°C)	−11.8 (−24.3)	−7.0 (−21.7)	5.7 (−14.6)	21.8 (−5.7)	34.9 (1.6)	47.3 (8.5)	52.9 (11.6)	50.9 (10.5)	36.0 (2.2)	23.8 (−4.6)	10.2 (−12.1)	−3.6 (−19.8)	−15.6 (−26.4)
Record low °F (°C)	−32 (−36)	−33 (−36)	−30 (−34)	6 (−14)	20 (−7)	34 (1)	42 (6)	34 (1)	22 (−6)	−8 (−22)	−13 (−25)	−34 (−37)	−34 (−37)
Average precipitation inches (mm)	0.95 (24)	1.14 (29)	1.96 (50)	4.10 (104)	5.15 (131)	4.88 (124)	4.42 (112)	4.14 (105)	3.44 (87)	2.70 (69)	1.86 (47)	1.38 (35)	36.12 (917)
Average snowfall inches (cm)	4.6 (12)	5.1 (13)	3.8 (9.7)	0.9 (2.3)	0.0 (0.0)	0.0 (0.0)	0.0 (0.0)	0.0 (0.0)	0.0 (0.0)	0.1 (0.25)	1.8 (4.6)	7.2 (18)	23.5 (59.85)
Average precipitation days (≥ 0.01 in)	7.1	7.5	8.5	11.7	13.7	12.3	9.6	10.3	9.0	9.3	7.1	8.0	114.1
Average snowy days (≥ 0.1 in)	3.1	2.9	1.5	0.3	0.0	0.0	0.0	0.0	0.0	0.0	0.9	3.7	12.4
Source 1: NOAA (average snowfall, snow days 1981–2010)
Source 2: National Weather Service

== Demographics ==
Historical populations
Year	Pop.	±%
1880	952	—
1890	2,880	+202.5%
1900	3,986	+38.4%
1910	4,630	+16.2%
1920	5,642	+21.9%
1930	5,881	+4.2%
1940	5,977	+1.6%
1950	6,174	+3.3%
1960	6,442	+4.3%
1970	6,906	+7.2%
1980	7,053	+2.1%
1990	6,652	−5.7%
2000	7,633	+14.7%
2010	7,702	+0.9%
2020	7,836	+1.7%
Source:"U.S. Census website". United States Census Bureau. and Iowa Data Center; Source: U.S. Decennial Census

=== Racial and ethnic composition ===
Perry, Iowa – Racial and ethnic composition Note: the US Census treats Hispanic/Latino as an ethnic category. This table excludes Latinos from the racial categories and assigns them to a separate category. Hispanics/Latinos may be of any race.
Race / Ethnicity (NH = Non-Hispanic)	Pop 2000	Pop 2010	Pop 2020	% 2000	% 2010	% 2020
White alone (NH)	5,561	4,709	3,689	72.85%	61.14%	30.89%
Black or African American alone (NH)	65	120	258	0.85%	1.56%	3.29%
Native American or Alaska Native alone (NH)	14	18	11	0.18%	0.23%	0.14%
Asian alone (NH)	55	60	84	0.72%	0.78%	1.07%
Pacific Islander alone (NH)	2	10	4	0.03%	0.13%	0.05%
Other race alone (NH)	12	12	21	0.16%	0.16%	0.27%
Mixed race or Multiracial (NH)	51	81	208	0.67%	1.05%	2.65%
Hispanic or Latino (any race)	1,873	2,692	2,902	24.54%	34.95%	%
Total	7,633	7,702	7,836	100.00%	100.00%	100.00%

=== 2020 census ===
As of the 2020 census, Perry had a population of 7,836. The median age was 35.1 years. 28.4% of residents were under the age of 18 and 15.7% of residents were 65 years of age or older. For every 100 females there were 96.6 males, and for every 100 females age 18 and over there were 95.5 males age 18 and over.

97.0% of residents lived in urban areas, while 3.0% lived in rural areas.

There were 2,901 households in Perry, of which 35.3% had children under the age of 18 living in them. Of all households, 43.6% were married-couple households, 19.7% were households with a male householder and no spouse or partner present, and 29.7% were households with a female householder and no spouse or partner present. About 30.3% of all households were made up of individuals and 13.7% had someone living alone who was 65 years of age or older.

There were 3,219 housing units, of which 9.9% were vacant. The homeowner vacancy rate was 2.9% and the rental vacancy rate was 7.5%.

=== 2010 census ===
At the 2010 census there were 7,702 people, 2,792 households, and 1,920 families living in the city. The population density was 1,847.0 inhabitants per square mile (713.1/km^{2}). There were 3,180 housing units at an average density of 762.6 per square mile (294.4/km^{2}). The racial makup of the city (including Latinos in the racial counts) was 79.1% White, 1.8% African American, 0.5% Native American, 0.8% Asian, 0.1% Pacific Islander, 14.1% from other races, and 3.5% from two or more races. Hispanic or Latino of any race were 35.0%.

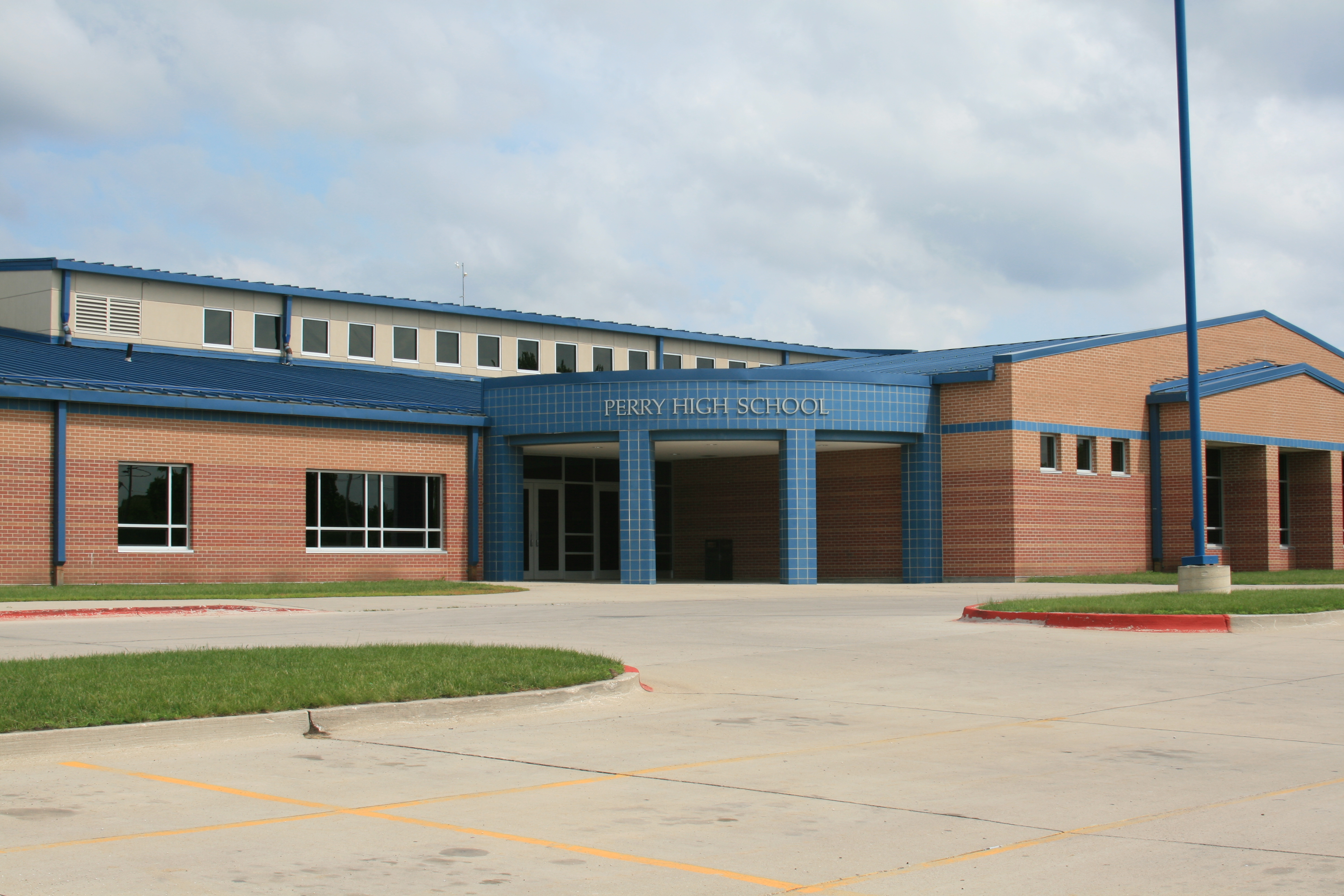
Perry High School

Of the 2,792 households 37.8% had children under the age of 18 living with them, 47.0% were married couples living together, 12.7% had a female householder with no husband present, 7.3% had a male householder with no wife present, and 33.0% were non-families. 28.2% of households were one person and 13.9% were one person aged 65 or older. The average household size was 2.71 and the average family size was 3.29.

The median age was 33.3 years. 29.8% of residents were under the age of 18; 8.9% were between the ages of 18 and 24; 25.3% were from 25 to 44; 22.3% were from 45 to 64; and 13.8% were 65 or older. The gender makeup of the city was 50.0% male and 50.0% female.

=== 2000 census ===
At the 2000 census there were 7,633 people, 2,831 households, and 1,942 families living in the city. The population density was 2,060.4 inhabitants per square mile (795.5/km^{2}). There were 2,994 housing units at an average density of 808.2 per square mile (312.0/km^{2}). The racial makup of the city was 82.84% White, 1.06% African American, 0.33% Native American, 0.75% Asian, 0.18% Pacific Islander, 13.19% from other races, and 1.65% from two or more races. Hispanic or Latino of any race were 24.54%.

Of the 2,831 households 34.5% had children under the age of 18 living with them, 52.1% were married couples living together, 10.9% had a female householder with no husband present, and 31.4% were non-families. 26.3% of households were one person and 14.0% were one person aged 65 or older. The average household size was 2.64 and the average family size was 3.13.

The age distribution was 27.3% under the age of 18, 8.9% from 18 to 24, 29.5% from 25 to 44, 18.2% from 45 to 64, and 16.0% 65 or older. The median age was 35 years. For every 100 females, there were 98.0 males. For every 100 females age 18 and over, there were 95.0 males.

The median household income was $35,429 and the median family income was $41,771. Males had a median income of $27,610 versus $21,839 for females. The per capita income for the city was $15,935. About 8.9% of families and 12.2% of the population were below the poverty line, including 15.6% of those under age 18 and 9.4% of those age 65 or over.

== Economy ==
In April 2018, a video showcasing Perry's economy in 1979 and 1980 was released by Iowa State University.

The primary employer in Perry was the Tyson Foods pork plant. In March 2024, due to budgetary reasons, Tyson announced the closing of the facility for June of that year, which laid off an estimated 1,300 jobs with 800 employees living in Perry losing their jobs.

== Education ==
The Perry Community School District operates local area public schools.

The Roman Catholic Diocese of Des Moines operates St. Patrick School in Perry. The school was dedicated on February 21, 1921. The local Catholic high school is Dowling Catholic High School in West Des Moines.

== Media ==
- KDLS-FM
- KDLS (AM)
- KICG

== Notable people ==
- William Bell (1902–1971), premier American tuba player and teacher
- Sam Brinton (born c. 1988), nuclear engineer and LGBTQ+ activist
- George W. Clarke (1906–2006), Washington State Legislator
- Gertrude Mary Cox (1900–1978), influential American statistician
- Dan Grimm (1941–2018), American football offensive lineman in the NFL
- V. T. Hamlin (1900–1993), cartoonist and creator of Alley Oop
- Kate Stevens Harpel (1867-1950), teacher, school board member, physician
- Dwight D. Opperman (1923–2013), CEO of West Publishing, later known as Thomson Reuters
- Jessica Reznicek (born 1981), Catholic Worker Movement and environmental activist

== See also ==
- Raccoon River Valley Trail
- BRR - Bicycle Ride to Rippey
- Sports Illustrated 40th Anniversary Swimsuit Special: American Beauty (2004)
- Impact of the COVID-19 pandemic on the meat industry in the United States
