= Dallas County, Iowa =

County in Iowa, United States

- County
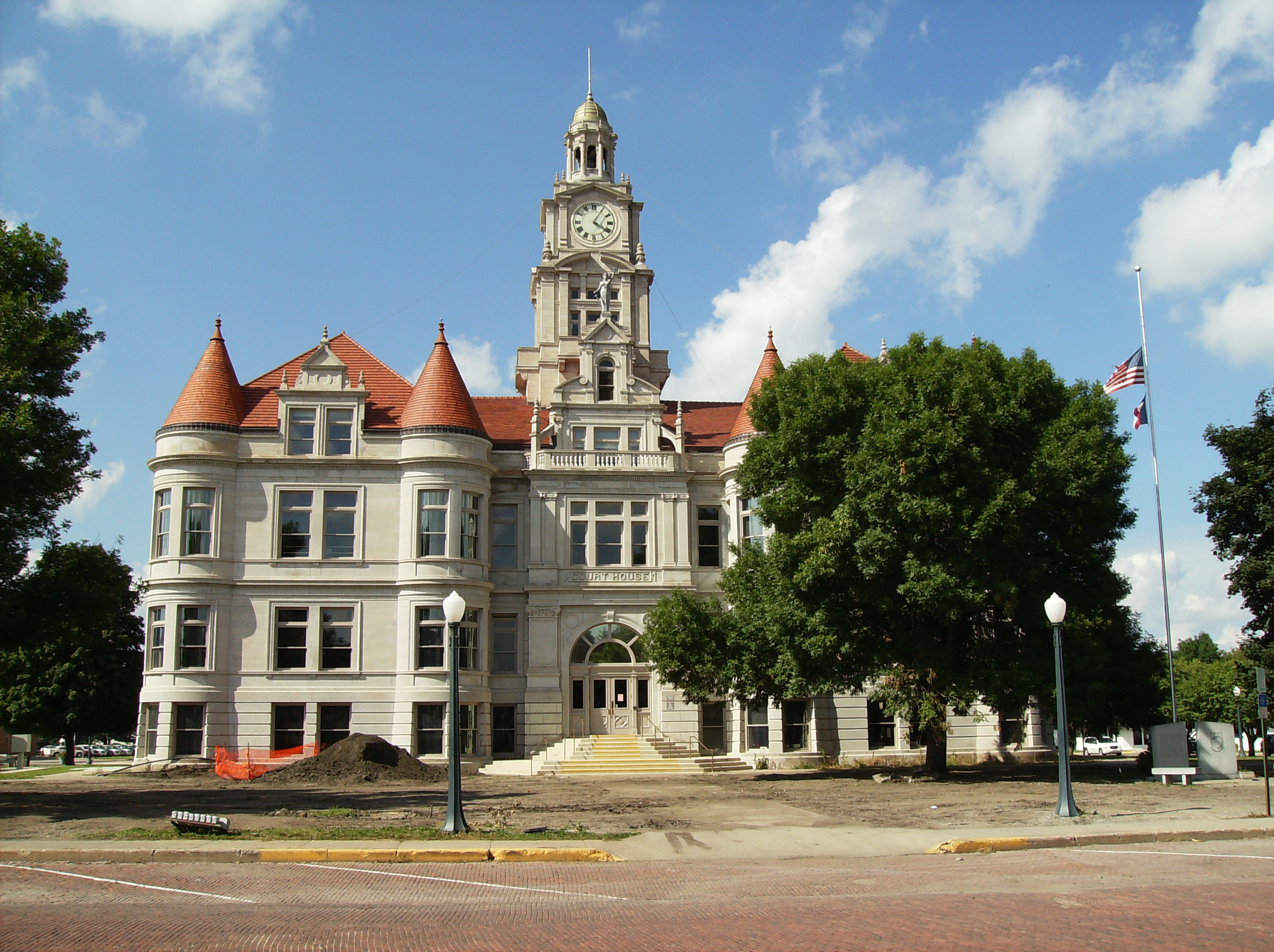
- The Dallas County Courthouse in Adel

- Location within the U.S. state of Iowa
- Coordinates: 41.68532°N 94.040706°W
- Country: United States
- State: Iowa
- Founded: January 13, 1846
- Named for: George M. Dallas
- Seat: Adel
- Largest city: Waukee

Area
  - Total: 591.605 sq mi (1,532.25 km^{2})
  - Land: 588.230 sq mi (1,523.51 km^{2})
  - Water: 3.375 sq mi (8.74 km^{2}) 0.57%

Population (2020)
  - Total: 99,678
  - Estimate (2025): 118,457 ▲
  - Density: 169.45/sq mi (65.427/km^{2})
- Time zone: UTC−6 (Central)
  - Summer (DST): UTC−5 (CDT)
- Area code: 515
- Congressional district: 3rd
- Website: dallascountyiowa.gov
- Iowa county number 25

Dallas County is a county located in the U.S. state of Iowa. As of the 2020 census, its population was 99,678, and was estimated to be 118,457 in 2025. making it the sixth-most populous county in Iowa. Between 2010 and 2020, it was the fastest growing county in Iowa and one of the fastest growing in the country. In 2026, the US Census Bureau labled Dallas County the fastest growing county in the Midwestern United States between July 2020 and July 2025. The county seat is Adel and the largest city is Waukee. The county was named for George M. Dallas, Vice President of the United States under James K. Polk, the namesake of neighboring Polk County.

Dallas County is included in the Des Moines–West Des Moines, IA Metropolitan Statistical Area.

== History ==
The land that now forms Dallas County was ceded by the Sac and Fox nation to the United States in a treaty signed on October 11, 1842. White settlement in Dallas County began afterwards, many of the settlers were of Yankee descent.

On January 13, 1846, the legislative body of the Iowa Territory authorized the creation of twelve counties in the Iowa Territory, with general descriptions of their boundaries. Dallas County's name referred to United States Vice President George M. Dallas, who served from 1845 to 1849.

In 1847 the county residents voted to designate Penoch as the county seat (the name was changed to Adel in 1849). The county's population grew rapidly, with settlers coming to claim homesteads. By 1870, the population had crossed the 12,000 mark.

== Geography ==
According to the United States Census Bureau, the county has a total area of 591.605 square miles (1,532.25 km^{2}), of which 588.230 square miles (1,523.51 km^{2}) is land and 3.375 square miles (8.74 km^{2}) (0.57%) is water. It is the 24th largest county in Iowa by total area.

=== Major highways ===
- Interstate 80 – runs east-northeast across the southern portion of the county, passing Dexter and De Soto on its way to Des Moines
- U.S. Highway 6 – from its starting point in Adel, runs east across the midsection of the county on its way to Des Moines
- U.S. Highway 169 – runs north–south through the center of the county, from Bouton to Adel to De Soto
- Iowa Highway 17 – from its starting point (intersection with Iowa 141) at Granger, runs north along the county's eastern boundary, into Boone County
- Iowa Highway 44 – runs east–west through the center of the county, through Dallas Center
- Iowa Highway 141 – runs east across northern portion of county, through Dawson, Perry, Bouton and Woodward, then southeast to exit into Polk County at Granger
- Iowa Highway 144 - from its starting point (intersection w Iowa 141) at Perry, runs north into Boone County
- Iowa Highway 210 – from its starting point (intersection w Iowa 141), runs north to Woodward and continues into Boone County

=== Adjacent counties ===
- Adair County – southwest
- Boone County – north
- Greene County – north and northwest
- Guthrie County – west
- Madison County – south
- Polk County – east
- Warren County – southeast

== Demographics ==
Historical population
Census	Pop.	Note	%±
1850	854		—
1860	5,244		514.1%
1870	12,019		129.2%
1880	18,746		56.0%
1890	20,479		9.2%
1900	23,058		12.6%
1910	23,628		2.5%
1920	25,120		6.3%
1930	25,493		1.5%
1940	24,649		−3.3%
1950	23,661		−4.0%
1960	24,123		2.0%
1970	26,085		8.1%
1980	29,513		13.1%
1990	29,755		0.8%
2000	40,750		37.0%
2010	66,135		62.3%
2020	99,678		50.7%
2025 (est.)	118,457	▲	18.8%
U.S. Decennial Census; 1790–1960 1900–1990; 1990–2000 2010–2020

As of the second quarter of 2025, the median home value in Dallas County was $379,620.

As of the 2024 American Community Survey, there are 46,373 estimated households in Dallas County with an average of 2.47 persons per household. The county has a median household income of $95,334. Approximately 5.7% of the county's population lives at or below the poverty line. Dallas County has an estimated 73.4% employment rate, with 54.1% of the population holding a bachelor's degree or higher and 94.4% holding a high school diploma. There were 48,279 housing units at an average density of 82.08 per square mile (31.7/km^{2}).

The top five reported languages (people were allowed to report up to two languages, thus the figures will generally add to more than 100%) were English (86.0%), Spanish (4.3%), Indo-European (3.2%), Asian and Pacific Islander (3.8%), and Other (2.7%).

The median age in the county was 36.6 years.

=== Racial and ethnic composition ===
Dallas County, Iowa – racial and ethnic composition Note: the US Census treats Hispanic/Latino as an ethnic category. This table excludes Latinos from the racial categories and assigns them to a separate category. Hispanics/Latinos may be of any race.
Race / ethnicity (NH = non-Hispanic)	Pop. 1980	Pop. 1990	Pop. 2000	Pop. 2010	Pop. 2020
White alone (NH)	29,167 (98.83%)	29,406 (98.83%)	37,658 (92.41%)	58,630 (88.65%)	81,708 (81.97%)
Black or African American alone (NH)	55 (0.19%)	62 (0.21%)	281 (0.69%)	890 (1.35%)	2,657 (2.67%)
Native American or Alaska Native alone (NH)	19 (0.06%)	42 (0.14%)	46 (0.11%)	94 (0.14%)	137 (0.14%)
Asian alone (NH)	70 (0.24%)	68 (0.23%)	278 (0.68%)	1,652 (2.50%)	4,987 (5.00%)
Pacific Islander alone (NH)	—	—	6 (0.01%)	37 (0.06%)	32 (0.03%)
Other race alone (NH)	10 (0.03%)	1 (0.00%)	36 (0.09%)	47 (0.07%)	340 (0.34%)
Mixed race or multiracial (NH)	—	—	246 (0.60%)	726 (1.10%)	3,302 (3.31%)
Hispanic or Latino (any race)	192 (0.65%)	176 (0.59%)	2,199 (5.40%)	4,059 (6.14%)	6,515 (6.54%)
Total	29,513 (100.00%)	29,755 (100.00%)	40,750 (100.00%)	66,135 (100.00%)	99,678 (100.00%)

=== 2020 census ===
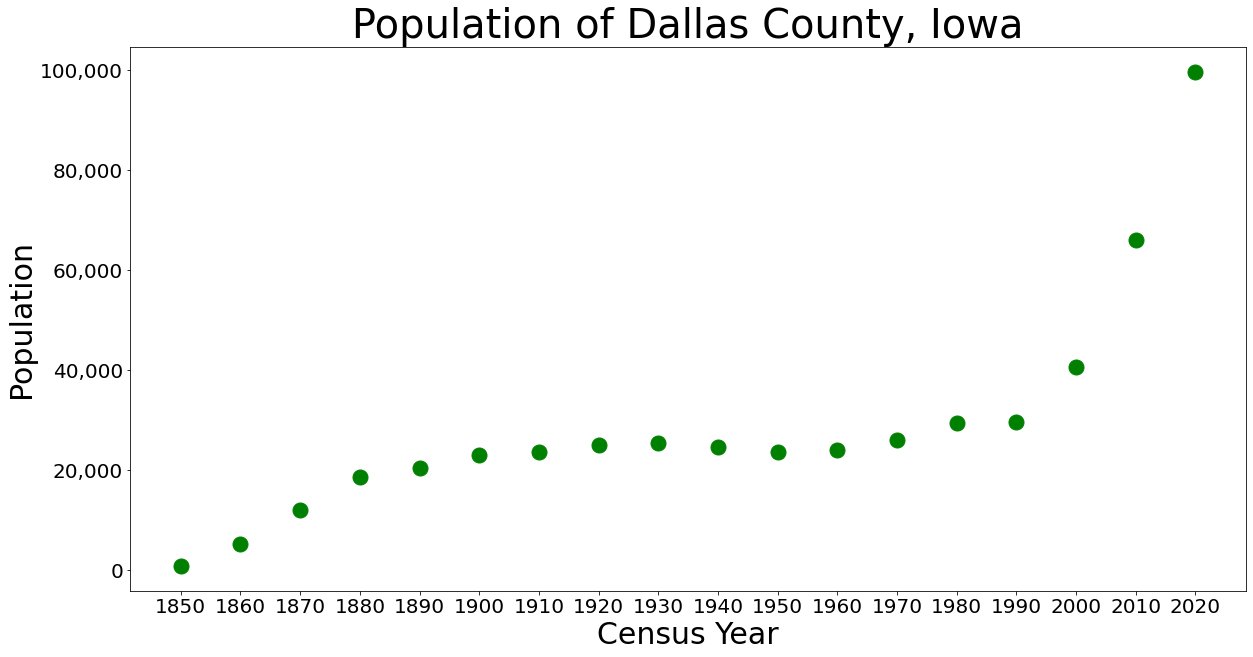
Population of Dallas County from the U.S. Census Data

As of the 2020 census, there were 99,678 people, 38,291 households, and 26,000 families residing in the county. The population density was 169.45 inhabitants per square mile (65.4/km^{2}). There were 41,125 housing units at an average density of 69.91 per square mile (27.0/km^{2}). The racial makeup of the county was 83.63% White, 2.71% African American, 0.22% Native American, 5.03% Asian, 0.04% Pacific Islander, 2.56% from some other races and 5.81% from two or more races. Hispanic or Latino people of any race were 6.54% of the population.

There were 38,291 households in the county, of which 37.2% had children under the age of 18 living in them. Of all households, 55.8% were married-couple households, 15.2% were households with a male householder and no spouse or partner present, and 22.1% were households with a female householder and no spouse or partner present. About 25.2% of all households were made up of individuals and 8.4% had someone living alone who was 65 years of age or older.

The median age was 35.4 years. 27.7% of residents were under the age of 18 and 12.5% of residents were 65 years of age or older. For every 100 females there were 96.7 males, and for every 100 females age 18 and over there were 94.0 males age 18 and over.

78.7% of residents lived in urban areas, while 21.3% lived in rural areas.

There were 41,125 housing units, 6.9% were vacant. Among occupied housing units, 70.4% were owner-occupied and 29.6% were renter-occupied. The homeowner vacancy rate was 2.2% and the rental vacancy rate was 10.1%.

=== 2010 census ===
As of the 2010 census, there were 66,135 people, 25,239 households, and _ families residing in the county. The population density was 112.43 inhabitants per square mile (43.4/km^{2}). There were 27,259 housing units at an average density of 46.34 per square mile (17.9/km^{2}). The racial makeup of the county was 92.19% White, 1.39% African American, 0.19% Native American, 2.51% Asian, 0.06% Pacific Islander, 2.13% from some other races and 1.53% from two or more races. Hispanic or Latino people of any race were 6.14% of the population.

=== 2000 census ===
As of the 2000 census, there were 40,750 people, 15,584 households, and 11,173 families residing in the county. The population density was 69.28 inhabitants per square mile (26.7/km^{2}). There were 16,529 housing units at an average density of 28.10 per square mile (10.8/km^{2}). The racial makeup of the county was 94.75% White, 0.74% African American, 0.15% Native American, 0.69% Asian, 0.04% Pacific Islander, 2.79% from some other races and 0.84% from two or more races. Hispanic or Latino people of any race were 5.40% of the population.

There were 15,584 households, 37.20% had children under the age of 18 living with them, 60.60% were married couples living together, 8.00% had a female householder with no husband present, and 28.30% were non-families. 23.60% of households were one person and 8.20% were one person aged 65 or older. The average household size was 2.59 and the average family size was 3.08.

The age distribution was 28.20% under the age of 18, 6.90% from 18 to 24, 32.10% from 25 to 44, 21.60% from 45 to 64, and 11.10% 65 or older. The median age was 35 years. For every 100 females, there were 97.70 males. For every 100 females age 18 and over, there were 93.80 males.

The median household income was $48,528 and the median family income was $58,293. Males had a median income of $37,243 versus $27,026 for females. The per capita income for the county was $22,970. About 4.00% of families and 5.60% of the population were below the poverty line, including 6.10% of those under age 18 and 7.10% of those age 65 or over.

== Communities ==
=== Cities ===
- Adel
- Bouton
- Clive ‡
- Dallas Center
- Dawson
- De Soto
- Dexter
- Granger‡
- Grimes ‡
- Linden
- Minburn
- Perry
- Redfield
- Urbandale ‡
- Van Meter
- Waukee
- West Des Moines ‡
- Woodward

‡ partly in Polk County

=== Unincorporated communities ===
- Booneville
- Kennedy Station
- Moran
- Ortonville
- Panther
- Wiscotta
- Xenia
- Zook Spur

=== Townships ===
- Adams
- Adel
- Beaver
- Boone
- Colfax
- Dallas
- Des Moines
- Grant
- Lincoln
- Linn
- Spring Valley
- Sugar Grove
- Union
- Van Meter
- Walnut
- Washington

=== Population ranking ===
The population ranking of the following table is based on the 2020 census of Dallas County.

† county seat

Rank	City/Town/etc.	Municipal type	Population (2020 Census)	Population (2024 Estimate)
1	West Des Moines (mostly in Polk County)	City	68,723	73,664
2	Urbandale (partially in Polk County)	City	45,580	47,759
3	Waukee	City	23,940	34,420
4	Clive (partially in Polk County)	City	18,601	19,508
5	Grimes (mostly in Polk County)	City	15,392	17,266
6	Perry	City	7,836	8,046
7	† Adel	City	6,153	6,763
8	Granger (partially in Polk County)	City	1,654	2,095
9	Dallas Center	City	1,901	1,993
10	Van Meter	City	1,484	1,840
11	Woodward	City	1,346	1,383
12	De Soto	City	915	937
13	Redfield	City	731	719
14	Dexter	City	640	631
15	Minburn	City	325	317
16	Linden	City	200	206
17	Bouton	City	127	125
18	Dawson	City	116	110

== Politics ==
Prior to 1932, Dallas County was strongly Republican in presidential elections. From 1932 to 1996, it was a swing county, having a Republican lean until 1960 & a Democratic lean from 1964 to 1996, especially during the 1980s farm crisis. Since 2000, it has been consistently Republican, though no Republican presidential candidate has won over 58% of the vote nor has a Democrat won less than 41% since then.

United States presidential election results for Dallas County, Iowa
Year	Republican		Democratic		Third party(ies)	
Year	No.	%	No.	%	No.	%
1880	2,314	56.19%	517	12.55%	1,287	31.25%
1884	2,636	52.95%	2,034	40.86%	308	6.19%
1888	2,538	57.12%	1,579	35.54%	326	7.34%
1892	2,679	56.02%	1,641	34.32%	462	9.66%
1896	3,326	57.87%	2,316	40.30%	105	1.83%
1900	3,601	62.35%	1,940	33.59%	234	4.05%
1904	3,499	69.99%	1,159	23.18%	341	6.82%
1908	3,132	59.94%	1,871	35.81%	222	4.25%
1912	1,825	34.77%	1,718	32.73%	1,706	32.50%
1916	2,900	52.37%	2,495	45.05%	143	2.58%
1920	6,677	70.63%	2,577	27.26%	200	2.12%
1924	6,359	61.97%	933	9.09%	2,969	28.93%
1928	7,294	69.73%	3,108	29.71%	58	0.55%
1932	4,516	46.99%	4,887	50.85%	208	2.16%
1936	5,442	45.45%	6,341	52.96%	190	1.59%
1940	6,218	47.55%	6,729	51.45%	131	1.00%
1944	5,413	49.83%	5,316	48.93%	135	1.24%
1948	4,810	44.46%	5,661	52.32%	348	3.22%
1952	8,008	63.51%	4,501	35.69%	101	0.80%
1956	6,619	56.06%	5,185	43.92%	2	0.02%
1960	6,566	53.93%	5,597	45.97%	13	0.11%
1964	3,763	33.41%	7,447	66.13%	52	0.46%
1968	5,549	49.16%	5,062	44.85%	676	5.99%
1972	6,143	53.72%	5,085	44.46%	208	1.82%
1976	5,308	43.34%	6,722	54.89%	217	1.77%
1980	6,296	48.57%	5,310	40.96%	1,358	10.48%
1984	6,080	47.85%	6,564	51.66%	63	0.50%
1988	4,858	39.12%	7,501	60.40%	60	0.48%
1992	5,587	37.60%	6,554	44.10%	2,720	18.30%
1996	6,647	41.52%	8,017	50.07%	1,346	8.41%
2000	10,306	53.32%	8,561	44.29%	463	2.40%
2004	15,183	57.75%	10,917	41.52%	193	0.73%
2008	16,954	51.94%	15,149	46.41%	540	1.65%
2012	20,988	55.06%	16,576	43.49%	552	1.45%
2016	19,339	50.56%	15,701	41.05%	3,212	8.40%
2020	27,987	49.96%	26,879	47.98%	1,156	2.06%
2024	32,374	51.42%	29,402	46.70%	1,185	1.88%

== See also ==
- National Register of Historic Places listings in Dallas County, Iowa
- Raccoon River Valley Trail
