= West Central Activities Conference (Iowa) =

Iowa High School athletic conference

- Conference: IHSAA / IGHSAU
- Founded: 1981
- Sports fielded: 13; men's: 7; women's: 6
- Division: 2A and 3A
- No. of teams: 11
- Region: Central Iowa
- Website: www.wcaconference.org

The West Central Activities Conference is a high school athletic conference made up of 2A and 3A schools in Central Iowa.

== Members ==
Institution	Location	Mascot	Colors	Affiliation	2026-2027 BEDS
AC/GC	Guthrie Center	Chargers		Public	138
Earlham	Earlham	Cardinals		Public	123
Interstate 35	Truro	Roadrunners		Public	195
Madrid	Madrid	Tigers		Public	149
Martensdale-St. Mary's	Martensdale	Blue Devils		Public	113
Ogden	Ogden	Bulldogs		Public	160
Panorama	Panora	Panthers		Public	159
Pleasantville	Pleasantville	Trojans		Public	174
Van Meter	Van Meter	Bulldogs		Public	244
West Central Valley	Stuart	Wildcats		Public	193
Woodward Academy	Woodward	Knights		Troubled Youth Residential & Day School for Boys	85

== History ==
The current West Central Conference was formed in 1981 with eight members: Van Meter, Guthrie Center, Panora-Linden, Earlham, Martensdale-St. Mary's, Stuart-Menlo, Adair–Casey and Dexfield (Redfield). Prior to this time a different league known as the West Central Conference existed, but none of its members were founders of the new West Central Conference.

Throughout the 1980s, the league added Coon Rapids–Bayard and Nodaway Valley, and Panora-Linden began sharing with Y-J-B under the name Panorama. Dexfield and Stuart-Menlo also consolidated and left the league. In 1996, the league split in half as the four southernmost schools-along or south of Interstate 80-departed to conferences south and west: Martensdale-St. Mary's and Nodaway Valley to the Pride of Iowa and Earlham and Adair–Casey to the Rolling Hills Conference. The four remaining members brought in four new schools further north as replacements: Glidden–Ralston in Carroll County; East Greene (Grand Junction) and Paton-Churdan in Greene County; and Des Moines Christian in Urbandale in Polk County. In an interesting twist, two of the newcomers (East Greene and Paton-Churdan) and a forerunner school to Panorama (YJB) were members of the original West Central.

In 2000, West Central Valley (the consolidated district of former members Dexfield and Stuart-Menlo) joined the league from the Raccoon River Conference, a conference with much larger schools. In 2004, Earlham rejoined the league as its tenth team. By 2007, many of the schools in the conference were starting to grow close to 2A in size, leading to Paton-Churdan leaving the conference for the smaller Rolling Hills Conference. Madrid joined the league at this time from the Heart of Iowa Conference. In 2009, Glidden–Ralston left for the Rolling Hills Conference, being replaced by Woodward-Granger, another Heart of Iowa Conference team. East Greene then opted to also leave the conference and join the Rolling Hills Conference, for 2011 with Ogden, yet another former Heart of Iowa Conference member (and a member of the original West Central Conference) replacing them.

Coon Rapids–Bayard left West Central for the new Rolling Valley Conference in the 2013–14 school year.

In the 2018–19 school year, Interstate 35 and Pleasantville joined the West Central Conference. They made the move from the Pride of Iowa Conference, where I-35 had been a founding member back in 1987.

On June 6, 2025, Des Moines Christian Schools announced that they had officially accepted an invitation to join the Little Hawkeye Conference as their 9th member for the 2026-2027 school year.

On May 20, 2025, Woodward-Granger announced that they had officially voted during the May 19, 2025, regular board meeting to apply to join the Heart of Iowa Conference beginning July 1, 2026. It was reported this application was unanimously approved by the conference in June 2025.

On September 18, 2025, the Martensdale-St Marys Community School District voted to join the West Central Activities Conference, leaving their home in the Pride of Iowa Conference. The school will join for the 2026-2027 school year.

On December 19, 2025, the Van Meter school board officially approved a move to the Raccoon River Conference for the 2027-2028 school year.
