= List of school districts in Iowa =

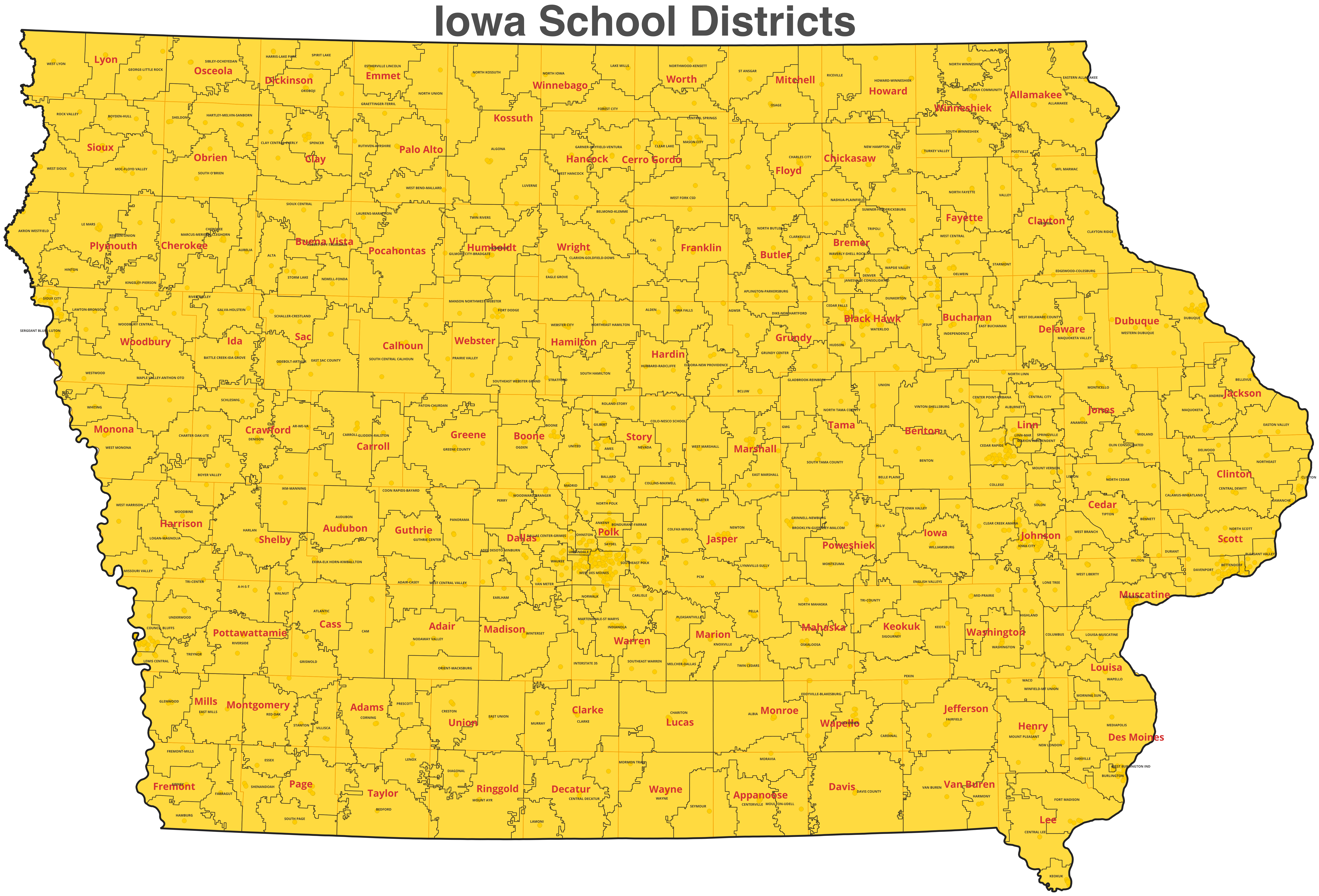
Iowa School Districts map. County boundaries in red and school district boundaries in black. Public school buildings are the dots.

This is a list of school districts in Iowa, sorted by Area Education Agencies (AEA). Districts are listed by their official names, though several schools use "Schools" in their name or website rather than "Community School District". As of July 2020, this list has not been expanded to include former school districts.

School districts have several classifications. They are counted as separate governments by the U.S. Census Bureau. Iowa has no school systems dependent on another layer of government.

== Background ==
In the early 1900s the state had 4,873 school districts. The state government passed the Consolidated School of Law of 1906 and this figure fell to 4,863 in 1908, 4,839 in 1922, and 4,558 in 1953. That year some additional laws were passed that contributed to reducing this further, and so this fell further to 458 as of July 1, 1965; that year another law made providing a high school mandatory for a school district, which meant school districts that had one room schoolhouses were required to consolidate. The deadline for such mergers to be finalized was April 1, 1966, with mergers themselves to occur on July 1 of that year.

By July 1, 1980, the number of districts was down to 443. In 1984, there were 437 school districts in the state that operated high schools. In 1990 the total number of school districts was 430. In fall 1995 the number of school districts operating high schools was down to 353, and in 1995 670 was the median enrollment K-12 of an Iowa school district. An Iowa Department of Education consultant named Guy Ghan referred to the 1990s school district mergers as the "third wave".

The total number of school districts was 365 on July 1, 2005. In the 2016–2017 school year there were 333 school districts, an 11% decrease from the same figure in 2000.

Circa the 1980s school districts began agreements to share resources, such as particular employees, or "whole grade sharing" (where students of one or more grade levels are sent to a different school district to get their education). In 2005 Tom Vilsack, the Governor of Iowa, proposed that requirements for school districts to have certain numbers of students or sharing employees as ways of reducing local government spending, though Vilsack never enacted those requirements. In 2007 Josh Nelson of The Waterloo-Cedar Falls Courier wrote that "Lately, consolidation hasn't been as big of an issue compared to previous years."

By 2016 population losses in rural areas have fueled further school district consolidations. By 2017 there had been school districts that had formed from different generations of school consolidations. By 2024, there were 325 public school districts.

== Central Rivers AEA ==
=== Black Hawk County ===
- Cedar Falls Community School District
- Dunkerton Community School District (also extends into Bremer County)
- Hudson Community School District
- Union Community School District
- Waterloo Community School District

=== Bremer County ===
- Denver Community School District (also extends into Black Hawk County)
- Janesville Consolidated Community School District (also extends into Black Hawk County)
- Sumner-Fredericksburg Community School District (also extends into Chickasaw and Fayette Counties)
- Tripoli Community School District (also extends into Chickasaw Counties)
- Wapsie Valley Community School District (also extends into Buchanan County)
- Waverly-Shell Rock Community School District (also extends into Black Hawk and Butler Counties)

=== Buchanan County ===
- East Buchanan Community School District
- Independence Community School District (Iowa) (also extends into Benton County)
- Jesup Community School District (also extends into Black Hawk County)

=== Butler County ===
- Aplington–Parkersburg Community School District (also extends into Grundy County)
- Clarksville Community School District
- North Butler Community School District (also extends into Floyd County)

=== Cerro Gordo County ===
- Clear Lake Community School District
- Mason City Community School District
- West Fork Community School District (also extends into Franklin County)

=== Chickasaw County ===
- Nashua-Plainfield Community School District (also extends into Bremer, Butler and Floyd Counties)

=== Floyd County ===
- Charles City Community School District
- Rudd-Rockford-Marble Rock Community School District

=== Franklin County ===
- CAL Community School District
- Hampton–Dumont Community School District

=== Grundy County ===
- BCLUW Community School District
- Dike–New Hartford Community School District (also extends into Butler County)
- Gladbrook–Reinbeck Community School District (also extends into Tama County)
- Grundy Center Community School District

=== Hancock County ===
- Garner–Hayfield–Ventura Community School District (also extends into Cerro Gordo County)
- West Hancock Community School District (also extends into Wright County)

=== Hardin County ===
- AGWSR Community School District (also extends into Franklin County)
- Alden Community School District (also extends into Franklin County)
- Eldora–New Providence Community School District
- Hubbard–Radcliffe Community School District
- Iowa Falls Community School District (also extends into Franklin County)

=== Marshall County ===
- East Marshall Community School District
- Marshalltown Community School District
- West Marshall Community School District (also extends into Story County)

=== Mitchell County ===
- Osage Community School District
- St. Ansgar Community School District

=== Poweshiek County ===
- Brooklyn-Guernsey-Malcom Community School District
- Grinnell–Newburg Community School District (also extends into Jasper County)
- Montezuma Community School District

=== Tama County ===
- GMG Community School District
- North Tama County Community School District
- South Tama County Community School District

=== Winnebago County ===
- Forest City Community School District (also extends into Hancock County)
- Lake Mills Community School District
- North Iowa Community School District

=== Worth County ===
- Central Springs Community School District (also extends into Cerro Gordo, Floyd and Mitchell Counties)
- Northwood-Kensett Community School District

=== Wright County ===
- Belmond–Klemme Community School District (also extends into Hancock County)

== Grant Wood AEA ==
=== Benton County ===
- Belle Plaine Community School District (also extends into Iowa, Powesheik and Tama Counties)
- Benton Community School District
- Vinton-Shellsburg Community School District

=== Cedar County ===
- North Cedar Community School District (of Stanwood) (also extends into Jones County)
- Tipton Community School District
- West Branch Community School District (also extends into Johnson County)

=== Iowa County ===
- English Valleys Community School District (also extends into Keokuk and Poweshiek Counties)
- H-L-V Community School District (also extends into Poweshiek County)
- Iowa Valley Community School District
- Williamsburg Community School District

=== Johnson County ===
- Clear Creek–Amana Community School District (also extends into Iowa County)
- Iowa City Community School District
- Lone Tree Community School District
- Solon Community School District (also extends into Linn County)

=== Jones County ===
- Anamosa Community School District
- Midland Community School District
- Monticello Community School District
- Olin Consolidated Community School District

=== Linn County ===
- Alburnett Community School District
- Cedar Rapids Community School District
- Center Point-Urbana Community School District
- Central City Community School District
- College Community School District (of Cedar Rapids) (also extends into Benton and Johnson Counties)
- Linn-Mar Community School District (of Marion)
- Lisbon Community School District
- Marion Independent School District
- Mount Vernon Community School District (also extends into Johnson and Jones Counties)
- North Linn Community School District (of Troy Mills)
- Springville Community School District

=== Washington County ===
- Highland Community School District (also extends into Johnson County)
- Mid-Prairie Community School District (also extends into Iowa and Johnson Counties)
- Washington Community School District (also extends into Jefferson Counties)

== Great Prairie AEA ==
=== Appanoose County ===
- Centerville Community School District
- Moravia Community School District (also extends into Monroe County)
- Moulton-Udell Community School District

=== Davis County ===
- Davis County Community School District

=== Des Moines County ===
- Burlington Community School District
- Danville Community School District (also extends into Henry County)
- Mediapolis Community School District (also extends into Louisa County)
- West Burlington Independent School District

=== Henry County ===
- Mount Pleasant Community School District (also extends into Jefferson, Lee and Van Buren Counties)
- New London Community School District (also extends into Des Moines County)
- WACO Community School District (also extends into Louisa and Washington Counties)
- Winfield-Mt. Union Community School District (also extends into Des Moines, Louisa and Washington Counties)

=== Jefferson County ===
- Fairfield Community School District (also extends into Henry, Van Buren, Wappello and Washington Counties)
- Pekin Community School District

=== Keokuk County ===
- Keota Community School District (also extends into Washington Counties)
- Sigourney Community School District
- Tri-County Community School District (also extends into Mahaska and Poweshiek Counties)

=== Lee County ===
- Central Lee Community School District
- Fort Madison Community School District (also extends into Henry County)
- Keokuk Community School District

=== Louisa County ===
- Morning Sun Community School District (also extends into Des Moines County)
- Wapello Community School District (also extends into Des Moines County)

=== Lucas County ===
- Chariton Community School District

=== Mahaska County ===
- North Mahaska Community School District (also extends into Poweshiek County)
- Oskaloosa Community School District

=== Monroe County ===
- Albia Community School District

=== Van Buren County ===
- Van Buren County Community School District

=== Wapello County ===
- Cardinal Community School District (also extends into Davis, Jefferson and Van Buren Counties)
- Eddyville–Blakesburg–Fremont Community School District (also extends into Mahaska and Monroe Counties)
- Ottumwa Community School District

=== Wayne County ===
- Seymour Community School District
- Wayne Community School District

== Green Hills AEA ==
=== Adair County ===
- Nodaway Valley Community School District
- Orient-Macksburg Community School District (also extends into Madison County)

=== Adams County ===
- Corning Community School District

=== Carroll County ===
- IKM–Manning Community School District (also extends into Crawford and Shelby Counties)

=== Cass County ===
- Atlantic Community School District (also extends into Audubon and Pottawattamie Counties)
- CAM Community School District (also extends into Adair, Adams and Audubon Counties)
- Griswold Community School District (also extends into Montgomery and Pottawattamie Counties)

=== Clarke County ===
- Clarke Community School District
- Murray Community School District

=== Decatur County ===
- Central Decatur Community School District
- Lamoni Community School District

=== Fremont County ===
- Fremont–Mills Community School District (also extends into Mills County)
- Hamburg Community School District
- Sidney Community School District

=== Harrison County ===
- Boyer Valley Community School District (also extends into Crawford County)
- Logan–Magnolia Community School District
- Missouri Valley Community School District (also extends into Pottawattamie County)
- West Harrison Community School District
- Woodbine Community School District (also extends into Monona and Shelby Counties)

=== Mills County ===
- East Mills Community School District (also extends into Montgomery County)
- Glenwood Community School District (also extends into Pottawattamie County)

=== Montgomery County ===
- Red Oak Community School District (also extends into Page and Pottawattamie Counties)
- Stanton Community School District (also extends into Page County)
- Villisca Community School District (also extends into Adams, Page and Taylor Counties)

=== Page County ===
- Clarinda Community School District (also extends into Taylor County)
- Essex Community School District (also extends into Montgomery County)
- Shenandoah Community School District (also extends into Fremont County)
- South Page Community School District

=== Pottawattamie County ===
- AHSTW Community School District
- Council Bluffs Community School District
- Lewis Central Community School District
- Riverside Community School District
- Treynor Community School District
- Tri-Center Community School District
- Underwood Community School District

=== Ringgold County ===
- Diagonal Community School District
- Mount Ayr Community School District

=== Shelby County ===
- Harlan Community School District (also extends into Harrison County)

=== Taylor County ===
- Bedford Community School District
- Lenox Community School District (also extends into Adams County)

=== Union County ===
- Creston Community School District
- East Union Community School District

=== Wayne County ===
- Mormon Trail Community School District

== Heartland AEA ==
=== Audubon County ===
- Audubon Community School District

=== Boone County ===
- Boone Community School District
- Madrid Community School District
- Ogden Community School District
- United Community School District (of Boone) (also extends into Story County)

=== Carroll County ===
- Carroll Community School District
- Coon Rapids–Bayard Community School District (also extends into Guthrie County)
- Glidden–Ralston Community School District (also extends into Greene County)

=== Dallas County ===
- Adel–De Soto–Minburn Community School District
- Perry Community School District
- Van Meter Community School District
- Waukee Community School District
- Woodward-Granger Community School District (also extends into Polk County)

=== Guthrie County ===
- Adair–Casey Community School District
- Guthrie Center Community School District
- Panorama Community School District
- West Central Valley Community School District (also extends into Adair and Dallas Counties)

=== Jasper County ===
- Baxter Community School District (also extends into Marshall Counties)
- Colfax–Mingo Community School District
- Lynnville–Sully Community School District (also extends into Mahaska and Poweshiek Counties)
- Newton Community School District
- PCM Community School District (also extends into Marion and Polk Counties)

=== Madison County ===
- Earlham Community School District
- Interstate 35 Community School District
- Winterset Community School District

=== Marion County ===
- Knoxville Community School District
- Melcher-Dallas Community School District
- Pella Community School District (also extends into Mahaska County)
- Pleasantville Community School District
- Twin Cedars Community School District

=== Polk County ===
- Ankeny Community School District
- Bondurant–Farrar Community School District
- Des Moines Independent Community School District (also extends into Warren County)
- Dallas Center-Grimes Community School District (also extends into Dallas County)
- Johnston Community School District
- North Polk Community School District
- Saydel Community School District
- Southeast Polk Community School District
- Urbandale Community School District (also extends into Dallas County)
- West Des Moines Community School District (also extends into Dallas and Warren Counties)

=== Shelby County ===
- Exira–Elk Horn–Kimballton Community School District (also extends into Audubon County)
- Harlan Community School District

=== Story County ===
- Ames Community School District
- Ballard Community School District (also extends into Boone and Polk Counties)
- Collins–Maxwell Community School District
- Colo–NESCO Community School District
- Gilbert Community School District
- Nevada Community School District
- Roland–Story Community School District

=== Warren County ===
- Carlisle Community School District (also extends into Polk County)
- Indianola Community School District
- Martensdale-St Marys Community School District
- Norwalk Community School District (also extends into Polk County)
- Southeast Warren Community School District

== Keystone AEA ==
=== Allamakee County ===
- Allamakee Community School District
- Eastern Allamakee Community School District
- Postville Community School District (also extends into Clayton County)

=== Chickasaw County ===
- New Hampton Community School District

=== Clayton County ===
- Central Community School District
- Clayton Ridge Community School District
- Edgewood–Colesburg Community School District (also extends into Delaware County)
- MFL MarMac Community School District

=== Delaware County ===
- Maquoketa Valley Community School District
- West Delaware County Community School District

=== Dubuque County ===
- Dubuque Community School District
- Western Dubuque Community School District

=== Fayette County ===
- North Fayette Valley Community School District
- Oelwein Community School District
- Starmont Community School District
- West Central Community School District

=== Howard County ===
- Howard–Winneshiek Community School District (also extends into Winneshiek County)
- Riceville Community School District (also extends into Mitchell County)

=== Winneshiek County ===
- Decorah Community School District (also extends into Allamakee County)
- South Winneshiek Community School District
- Turkey Valley Community School District

== Mississippi Bend AEA ==
=== Cedar County ===
- Bennett Community School District (also extends into Louisa and Scott Counties)
- Durant Community School District (also extends into Muscatine and Scott Counties)

=== Clinton County ===
- Calamus–Wheatland Community School District
- Camanche Community School District
- Central DeWitt Community School District
- Clinton Community School District
- Delwood Community School District (also extends into Jackson County)
- Northeast Community School District

=== Jackson County ===
- Andrew Community School District
- Bellevue Community School District
- Easton Valley School District (also extends into Clinton County)
- Maquoketa Community School District (also extends into Clinton and Dubuque Counties)

=== Louisa County ===
- Columbus Community School District (also extends into Muscatine County)
- Louisa–Muscatine Community School District (also extends into Muscatine County)

=== Muscatine County ===
- Muscatine Community School District
- West Liberty Community School District
- Wilton Community School District (also extends into Cedar County)

=== Scott County ===
- Bettendorf Community School District
- Davenport Community School District
- North Scott Community School District (of Eldridge)
- Pleasant Valley Community School District

== Northwest AEA ==
=== Cherokee County ===
- Cherokee Community School District
- Marcus-Meriden-Cleghorn Community School District

=== Crawford County ===
- Ar-We-Va Community School District (also extends into Carroll County)
- Charter Oak–Ute Community School District (also extends into Monona County)
- Denison Community School District (also extends into Ida County)
- Schleswig Community School District (also extends into Ida County)

=== Ida County ===
- Galva–Holstein Community School District
- Odebolt–Arthur–Battle Creek–Ida Grove Community School District (also extends into Sac County)

=== Lyon County ===
- Central Lyon Community School District
- George–Little Rock Community School District (also extends into Osceola and Sioux Counties)
- West Lyon Community School District (also extends into Sioux County)

=== Monona County ===
- Maple Valley-Anthon Oto Community School District (also extends into Woodbury County)
- West Monona Community School District (also extends into Harrison County)
- Whiting Community School District

=== O'Brien County ===
- Hartley–Melvin–Sanborn Community School District (also extends into Dickinson and Osceola Counties)
- Sheldon Community School District (also extends into Sioux County)
- South O'Brien Community School District

=== Osceola County ===
- Sibley-Ocheyedan Community School District

=== Plymouth County ===
- Akron–Westfield Community School District
- Hinton Community School District
- Kingsley–Pierson Community School District
- Le Mars Community School District
- Remsen-Union Community School District (also extends into Sioux County)

=== Sioux County ===
- Boyden-Hull Community School District
- MOC-Floyd Valley Community School District
- Rock Valley Community School District (also extends into Lyon County)
- Sioux Center Community School District
- West Sioux Community School District

=== Woodbury County ===
- Lawton–Bronson Community School District
- River Valley Community School District (also extends into Cherokee and Ida Counties)
- Sergeant Bluff-Luton Community School District
- Sioux City Community School District (also extends into Plymouth County)
- Westwood School District (also extends into Monona County)
- Woodbury Central Community School District

== Prairie Lakes AEA ==
=== Buena Vista County ===
- Albert City–Truesdale Community School District (also extends into Pocahontas County)
- Alta–Aurelia Community School District (also extends into Cherokee County)
- Newell-Fonda Community School District (also extends into Pocahontas County)
- Sioux Central Community School District
- Storm Lake Community School District (also extends into Sac County)

=== Calhoun County ===
- Manson–Northwest Webster Community School District (also extends into Webster County)
- South Central Calhoun Community School District

=== Clay County ===
- Clay Central–Everly Community School District (also extends into Dickinson and O'Brien Counties)
- Spencer Community School District

=== Dickinson County ===
- Harris–Lake Park Community School District (also extends into Osceola County)
- Okoboji Community School District
- Spirit Lake Community School District

=== Emmet County ===
- Estherville–Lincoln Central Community School District (also extends into Tama County)
- North Union Community School District (also extends into Kossuth and Palo Alto Counties)

=== Greene County ===
- Greene County Community School District
- Paton-Churdan Community School District

=== Hamilton County ===
- South Hamilton Community School District
- Stratford Community School District (also extends into Boone and Webster Counties)
- Webster City Community School District

=== Humboldt County ===
- Gilmore City–Bradgate Community School District (also extends into Pocahontas County)
- Humboldt Community School District (also extends into Webster and Wright Counties)
- Twin Rivers Community School District

=== Kossuth County ===
- Algona Community School District
- LuVerne Community School District (also extends into Humboldt County)
- North Kossuth Community School District

=== Palo Alto County ===
- Emmetsburg Community School District
- Graettinger–Terril Community School District (also extends into Clay, Dickinson and Emmet Counties)
- Ruthven-Ayrshire Community School District (also extends into Clay County)
- West Bend–Mallard Community School District (also extends into Kossuth County)

=== Pocahontas County ===
- Laurens–Marathon Community School District (also extends into Buena Vista, Clay and Palo Alto Counties)
- Pocahontas Area Community School District

=== Sac County ===
- East Sac County Community School District (also extends into Carroll and Crawford Counties)
- Schaller-Crestland Community School District

=== Webster County ===
- Fort Dodge Community School District
- Southeast Valley Community School District

=== Wright County ===
- Clarion–Goldfield–Dows Community School District (also extends into Franklin, Hancock and Humboldt Counties)
- Eagle Grove Community School District

== See also ==
- List of high schools in Iowa
- List of private schools in Iowa
- Wikipedia:WikiProject Missing encyclopedic articles/High schools/US/Iowa
- Iowa Department of Education
