= Senator Redfield =

Senator Redfield may refer to:

- Heman J. Redfield (1788–1877), New York State Senate
- James Redfield (Iowa soldier) (1824–1864), Iowa State Senate
- Pam Redfield (born 1948), Nebraska State Senate
- Timothy P. Redfield (1812–1888), Vermont State Senate
