= Dunkerton Community School District =

Public school district in Dunkerton, Iowa, United States

Coordinates: 42.567256°N 92.159944°W

Location
- Dunkerton, Iowa Black Hawk County and Bremer County United States
- Coordinates: 42.567256, -92.159944

District information
- Type: Local school district
- Grades: PK-12
- Superintendent: Tim Cronin
- Schools: 2
- Budget: $6,623,000 (2020-21)
- NCES District ID: 1909540

Students and staff
- Students: 414 (2012-23)
- Teachers: 37.17 FTE
- Staff: 32.60 FTE
- Student–teacher ratio: 11.14
- Athletic conference: Iowa Star
- District mascot: Raiders
- Colors: Red and Black

Other information
- Website: www.dunkerton.k12.ia.us

The Dunkerton Community School District is a rural public school district headquartered in Dunkerton, Iowa. The district is mostly within Black Hawk County, with a small area in Bremer County and serves the town of Dunkerton and the surrounding rural areas.

Tim Cronin became superintendent in 2019, through a sharing agreement with Central City Community School District.

== Schools ==
The district operates two schools in a single facility in Dunkerton:

- Dunkerton Elementary School
- Dunkerton High School

== See also ==
- List of school districts in Iowa
