= Pleasantville School District =

Pleasantville School District may refer to:

- Pleasantville Community School District (Iowa)
- Pleasantville Public Schools (New Jersey)
