= Dunkerton High School =

Public secondary school in Dunkerton, Iowa, United States

Coordinates: 42.567°N 92.160°W

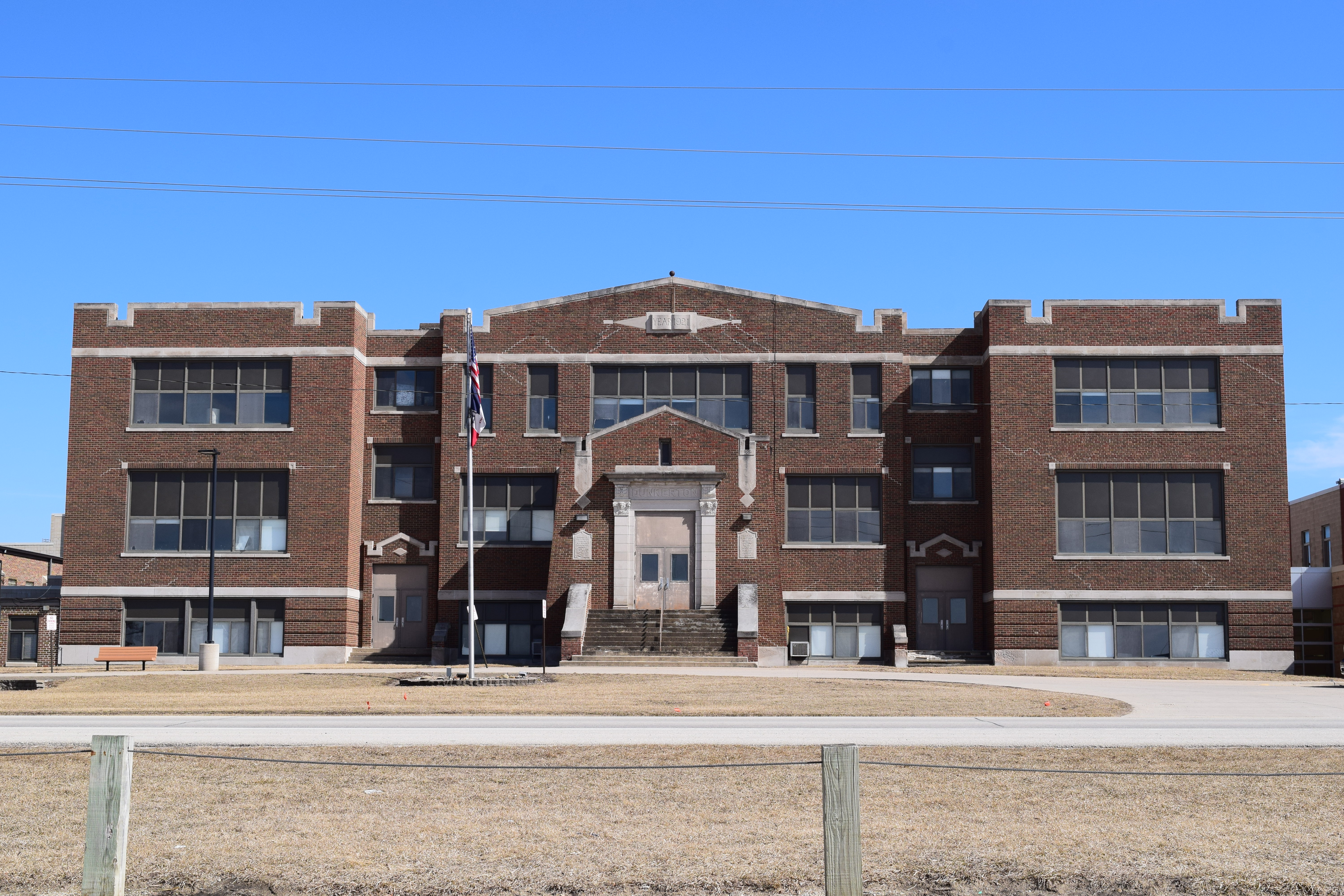

Location
- 509 S. Canfield; Dunkerton, Iowa 50626; USA

Information
- Type: Public
- Established: 1912
- Superintendent: Tim Cronin
- Principal: Kory Kelchen
- Teaching staff: 14.87 (FTE)
- Grades: 6-12
- Enrollment: 208 (2023-2024)
- Student to teacher ratio: 13.99
- Colors: Red and Black
- Athletics conference: Iowa Star
- Mascot: Raider
- Website: http://www.dunkerton.k12.ia.us

Dunkerton High School is a small rural public high school in Dunkerton, Iowa. It is part of the Dunkerton Community School District which operates PreK-12 education within one facility in Dunkerton.

== Athletics ==
The Raiders compete in the Iowa Star Conference, including the following sports:

- Cross County
- Volleyball
- Football
- Basketball
  - Boys' 2-time State Champions (1933, 2004)
- Track and Field
- Golf
- Baseball
- Softball

Students from Dunkerton can also participate in bowling with Denver Community School District, and girls' soccer with Waterloo East High School.

Dunkerton High School won the boys' basketball title twice, in 1933 and 2004. During the 2004 championship run, Dunkerton High School also claimed the Sportsmanship Award.

== See also ==
- List of high schools in Iowa
