= Adair–Casey Community School District =

Public school district in Adair, Iowa, United States

Coordinates: 41.520094°N 94.585034°W

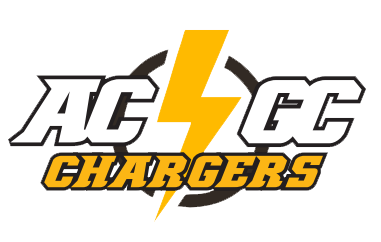

Location
- Adair, Iowa Adair, Guthrie, and Audubon counties United States
- Coordinates: 41.520094, -94.585034

District information
- Type: Local school district
- Grades: K–12
- Superintendent: Josh Rasmussen
- Schools: 2
- Budget: $5,912,000 (2020-21)
- NCES District ID: 1903090

Students and staff
- Students: 271 (2022-23)
- Teachers: 23.89 FTE
- Staff: 30.32 FTE
- Student–teacher ratio: 11.34
- Athletic conference: West Central Conference
- District mascot: Chargers
- Colors: Black and Gold

Other information
- Website: www.acgcschools.org

Adair–Casey Community School District is a public school district headquartered in Guthrie Center, Iowa.

The district serves both Adair and Casey, and the surrounding rural areas. Most of the district is in Adair and Guthrie counties, with smaller portions in Audubon County.

It has entered into a "grade-sharing" relationship with Guthrie Center Community School District in which it sends its high school students to the Guthrie Center school.

== Schools ==
Schools in Adair include:

- Adair–Casey Elementary School
- AC/GC Junior High School

Under grade-sharing, students attend AC/GC High School in Guthrie Center.

== See also ==
- List of school districts in Iowa
