= Panorama Community School District =

Public school district in Panora, Iowa, United States

Coordinates: 41.691995°N 94.375290°W

Location
- Panora, Iowa Guthrie, Dallas and Greene counties United States
- Coordinates: 41.691995, -94.375290

District information
- Type: Local school district
- Grades: K-12
- Established: 1989
- Superintendent: Kasey Huebner
- Schools: 3
- Budget: $12,307,000 (2020-21)
- NCES District ID: 1900025

Students and staff
- Students: 691 (2022-23)
- Teachers: 54.84 FTE
- Staff: 69.93 FTE
- Student–teacher ratio: 12.60
- Athletic conference: West Central
- District mascot: Panthers
- Colors: Dark Blue and Light Blue

Other information
- Website: www.panoramaschools.org

Panorama Community School District is a rural public school district headquartered in Panora, Iowa. It operates an elementary school, a middle school, and a high school in Panora.

The district is mostly in Guthrie County but has portions in Dallas and Greene counties. The district serves, in addition to Panora, the towns of Bagley, Jamaica, Linden, Yale, and Lake Panorama.

The 197-square-mile (510 km^{2}) district formed on July 1, 1989, as a merger of the Panora-Linden and Y-J-B school districts.

Panorama Community School District provides co-ed classes for grades K–12. Panorama Elementary School, which is located in the northwest corner of Panora on Clay Street, serves grades K–5, and, on the westside of Panora north of Iowa Highway 44, the Panorama Middle School/High School building, which opened its doors for school as the Panora-Linden Middle School/High School in August 1974, serves grades 6–12.

Panorama's teams are known as the Panthers, and their colors are navy blue and silver. The teams compete in the West Central Activities Conference (WCAC) and are part of the Iowa High School Athletic Association and Iowa Girls High School Athletic Union.

== Schools ==
The district operates three schools, all in Panora:

- Panorama Elementary School
- Panorama Middle School
- Panorama High School

== Superintendents ==
- William John "Bill" Weddingfeld (January 18, 1934, to January 15, 2024) from July 1, 1989, to June 30, 1995
- John Millhollin from July 1, 1995, to June 30, 2009
- Kathy Elliott from July 1, 2009, to June 30, 2015
- Shawn W. Holloway from July 1, 2015, to June 30, 2023
- Kasey Huebner since July 1, 2023

=== Panorama High School ===
==== Athletics ====
The Panthers compete in the West Central Activities Conference in the following sports:

- Cross Country
  - Girls' 2017 Class 1A State Runner-up
- Volleyball
- Football
- Basketball
  - Girls' 2023-24 Class 2A State Runner-up
- Wrestling
- Track and Field (Note: Prior to merging with Panora-Linden to form Panorama Schools in 1989, Yale-Jamaica-Bagley (YJB) of Jamaica was the Boys' 1977 Class C State Co-champions in Track and Field.)
  - Boys' 1997 Class 1A State Champions
- Golf
  - Boys' 2015 Class 2A State Champions
  - Boys' 2016 Class 2A State Champions
- Baseball
- Softball

== See also ==
- List of school districts in Iowa
- List of high schools in Iowa
