= Union Township, Dallas County, Iowa =

Township in Iowa, USA

Union Township
- Township
- Location in Dallas County
- Coordinates: 41°33′34″N 094°10′40″W
- Country: United States
- State: Iowa
- County: Dallas

Area
  - Total: 39.83 sq mi (103.16 km^{2})
  - Land: 39.79 sq mi (103.05 km^{2})
  - Water: 0.042 sq mi (0.11 km^{2}) 0.11%
- Elevation: 978 ft (298 m)

Population (2000)
  - Total: 2,146
  - Density: 54/sq mi (20.8/km^{2})
- GNIS feature ID: 0468816

Union Township is a township in Dallas County, Iowa, USA. As of the 2000 census, its population was 2,146.

== Geography ==
Union Township covers an area of 39.83 square miles (103.2 km^{2}) and contains two incorporated settlements: Dexter and Redfield. According to the USGS, it contains five cemeteries: Bear Creek, Dexter, Pleasant Hill, Spillers and Wiscotta.

The stream of Middle Raccoon River runs through this township.
