= Stanton Community School District =

Public school district in Stanton, Iowa, United States

Coordinates: 40.984494°N 95.100685°W

Location
- Stanton, Iowa Montgomery and Page counties United States
- Coordinates: 40.984494, -95.100685

District information
- Type: Local school district
- Grades: K-12
- Superintendent: David Gute
- Schools: 2
- Budget: $3,529,000 (2020-21)
- NCES District ID: 1927240

Students and staff
- Students: 290 (2022-23)
- Teachers: 18.47 FTE
- Staff: 23.45 FTE
- Student–teacher ratio: 15.70
- Athletic conference: Corner Conference
- District mascot: Vikings & Viqueens
- Colors: Purple and White

Other information
- Website: www.stantonschools.com

Stanton Community School District is a rural public school district headquartered in Stanton, Iowa. It is located in sections of Montgomery and Page counties. It has separate elementary and middle/high school divisions.

== Schools ==
The district operates two schools on one campus in Stanton:

- Stanton Elementary School
- Stanton High School

=== Stanton High School ===
==== Athletics ====
The Vikings & Viqueens compete in the Corner Conference in the following sports:

- Cross Country (boys and girls)
- Volleyball
- Football (2007 8-man State Champions)
- Basketball (boys and girls)
- Track and Field (boys and girls)
- Golf (boys and girls)
- Baseball
- Softball

== Notable alumni ==
- Joni Ernst, U.S. Senator representing Iowa

== See also ==
- List of school districts in Iowa
- List of high schools in Iowa
