= Ogden Community School District =

Public school district in Ogden, Iowa, United States

Coordinates: 42.032844°N 94.036262°W

Location
- Ogden, Iowa Boone County United States
- Coordinates: 42.032844, -94.036262

District information
- Type: Local school district
- Grades: K-12
- Superintendent: Joshua Heyer
- Schools: 3
- Budget: $11,163,000 (2020-21)
- NCES District ID: 1921660

Students and staff
- Students: 758 (2022-23)
- Teachers: 49.25 FTE
- Staff: 57.04 FTE
- Student–teacher ratio: 15.39
- Athletic conference: West Central
- District mascot: Bulldogs
- Colors: Royal and White

Other information
- Website: www.ogdenschools.org

The Ogden Community School District, or Ogden Community Schools, is a public school district headquartered in Ogden, Iowa.

The district is completely within Boone County. The district serves Ogden, Beaver, Berkley, and the surrounding rural areas.

Dr. Pam Dodge has served as superintendent since 2018, after serving as a principal in the Ankeny Community School District for six years.

Beginning in 2020, the district entered an agreement with United Community School District to share a superintendent. Dr. Dodge is serving as superintendent for both districts.

== Schools ==
The district has three schools on a single campus in Ogden.

- Ogden Elementary School
- Ogden Middle School
- Ogden Senior High School

=== Ogden High School ===
==== Athletics ====
The Bulldogs compete in the West Central Activities Conference in the following sports:

- Cross Country
- Volleyball
- Football
- Basketball
- Wrestling
- Track and Field
- Golf
- Baseball
- Softball

Students from Ogden can also participate in the following sports as part of the teams from Boone:

- Soccer

== See also ==
- List of school districts in Iowa
- List of high schools in Iowa
