= Redfield, Iowa =

- City
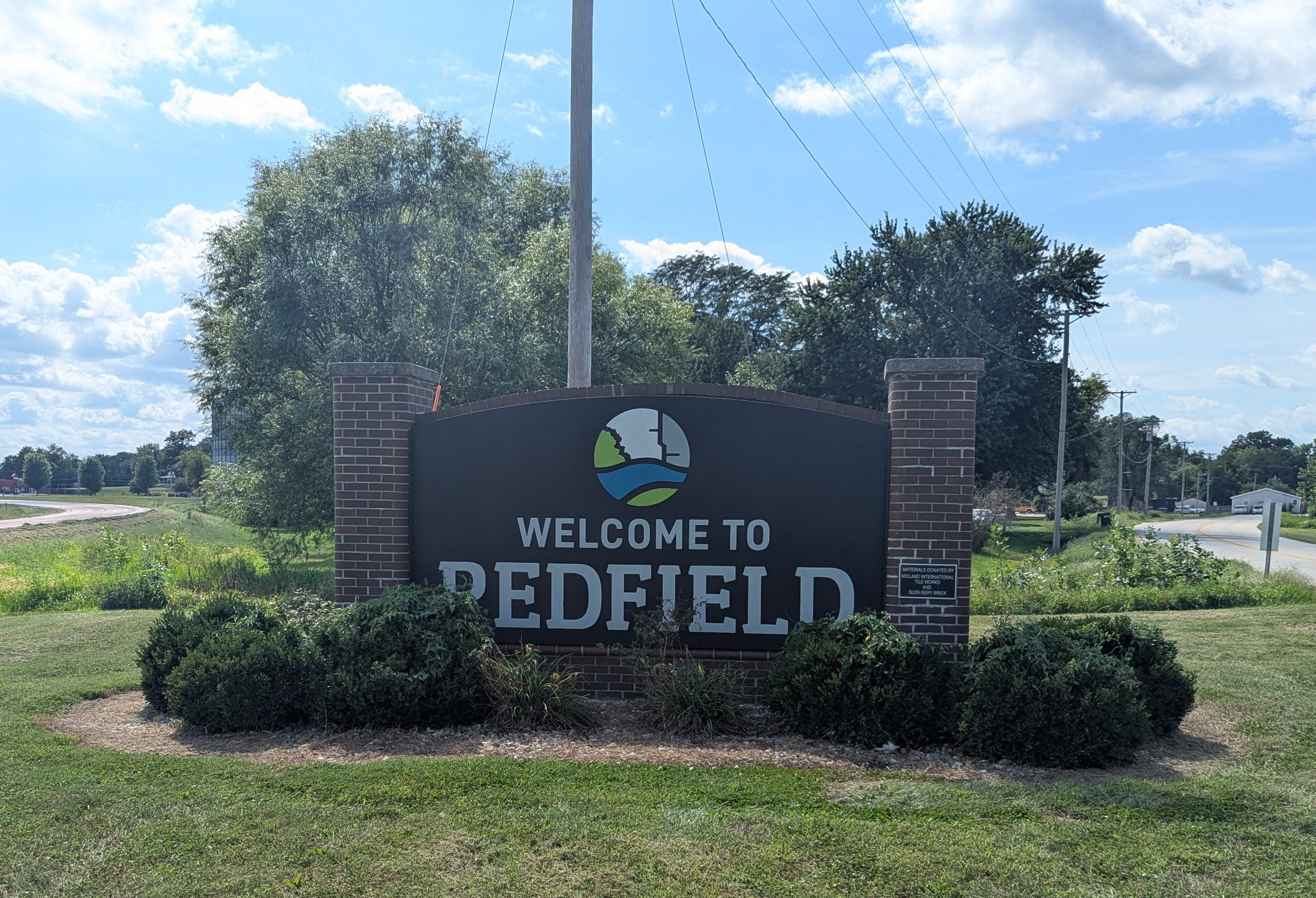
- Welcome sign
- Motto: "Not quite the heart of Iowa, but holds all the love..."
- Location of Redfield, Iowa
- Coordinates: 41°35′26″N 94°11′47″W
- Country: USA
- State: Iowa
- County: Dallas

Area
  - Total: 1.36 sq mi (3.51 km^{2})
  - Land: 1.36 sq mi (3.51 km^{2})
  - Water: 0 sq mi (0.00 km^{2})
- Elevation: 971 ft (296 m)

Population (2020)
  - Total: 731
  - Density: 539.1/sq mi (208.15/km^{2})
- Time zone: UTC-6 (Central (CST))
  - Summer (DST): UTC-5 (CDT)
- ZIP code: 50233
- Area code: 515
- FIPS code: 19-66045
- GNIS feature ID: 2396340
- Website: www.redfieldia.com

Redfield is a city, one of two incorporated settlements in Union Township, Dallas County, Iowa, United States, along the Middle Raccoon River. The population was 731 at the time of the 2020 census. It is part of the Des Moines–West Des Moines Metropolitan Statistical Area.

== Etymology ==
Redfield obtained its name from Lieutenant Colonel James Redfield, an early settler who served in the 39th Iowa Infantry of the Union Army during the Civil War. Col. James Redfield bought Redfield (at which time it was called New Ireland) and the name was changed. §

== Geography ==
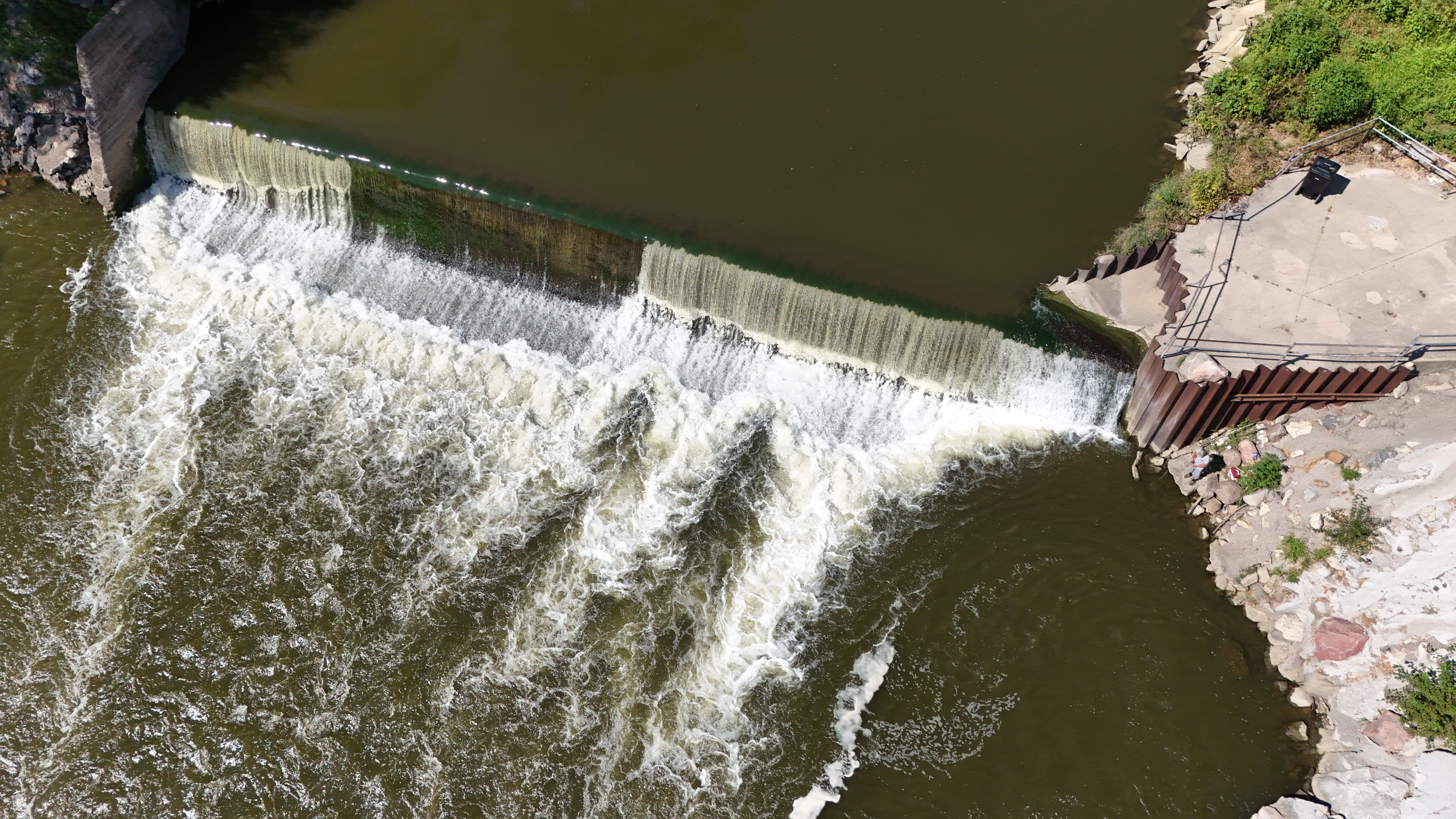
Redfield Dam on the Middle Raccoon River

According to the United States Census Bureau, the city has a total area of 1.40 square miles (3.63 km^{2}), all land.

== Demographics ==
Historical populations
Year	Pop.	±%
1880	394	—
1890	397	+0.8%
1900	509	+28.2%
1910	659	+29.5%
1920	770	+16.8%
1930	870	+13.0%
1940	898	+3.2%
1950	892	−0.7%
1960	966	+8.3%
1970	921	−4.7%
1980	959	+4.1%
1990	883	−7.9%
2000	833	−5.7%
2010	835	+0.2%
2020	731	−12.5%
Source:"U.S. Census website". United States Census Bureau. and Iowa Data Center; Source: U.S. Decennial Census

=== 2020 census ===
As of the census of 2020, there were 731 people, 322 households, and 204 families residing in the city. The population density was 539.1 inhabitants per square mile (208.1/km^{2}). There were 361 housing units at an average density of 266.2 per square mile (102.8/km^{2}). The racial makeup of the city was 93.7% White, 0.5% Black or African American, 0.0% Native American, 0.3% Asian, 0.0% Pacific Islander, 1.6% from other races and 3.8% from two or more races. Hispanic or Latino persons of any race comprised 3.3% of the population.

Of the 322 households, 28.0% of which had children under the age of 18 living with them, 46.6% were married couples living together, 10.2% were cohabitating couples, 22.4% had a female householder with no spouse or partner present and 20.8% had a male householder with no spouse or partner present. 36.6% of all households were non-families. 27.6% of all households were made up of individuals, 9.9% had someone living alone who was 65 years old or older.

The median age in the city was 42.3 years. 21.8% of the residents were under the age of 20; 7.3% were between the ages of 20 and 24; 23.0% were from 25 and 44; 28.2% were from 45 and 64; and 19.8% were 65 years of age or older. The gender makeup of the city was 50.5% male and 49.5% female.

=== 2010 census ===
As of the census of 2010, there were 835 people, 341 households, and 233 families living in the city. The population density was 596.4 inhabitants per square mile (230.3/km^{2}). There were 381 housing units at an average density of 272.1 per square mile (105.1/km^{2}). The racial makeup of the city was 95.9% White, 0.4% African American, 0.1% Native American, 1.6% from other races, and 2.0% from two or more races. Hispanic or Latino of any race were 4.0% of the population.

There were 341 households, of which 29.0% had children under the age of 18 living with them, 48.1% were married couples living together, 13.5% had a female householder with no husband present, 6.7% had a male householder with no wife present, and 31.7% were non-families. 26.7% of all households were made up of individuals, and 12% had someone living alone who was 65 years of age or older. The average household size was 2.45 and the average family size was 2.91.

The median age in the city was 40 years. 25% of residents were under the age of 18; 7.2% were between the ages of 18 and 24; 24.6% were from 25 to 44; 25.8% were from 45 to 64; and 17.4% were 65 years of age or older. The gender makeup of the city was 51.5% male and 48.5% female.

=== 2000 census ===
As of the census of 2000, there were 833 people, 347 households, and 232 families living in the city. The population density was 602.6 inhabitants per square mile (232.7/km^{2}). There were 369 housing units at an average density of 266.9 per square mile (103.1/km^{2}). The racial makeup of the city was 98.92% White, 0.12% Native American, 0.60% from other races, and 0.36% from two or more races. Hispanic or Latino of any race were 0.84% of the population.

There were 347 households, out of which 29.4% had children under the age of 18 living with them, 51.3% were married couples living together, 10.7% had a female householder with no husband present, and 33.1% were non-families. 29.1% of all households were made up of individuals, and 13.3% had someone living alone who was 65 years of age or older. The average household size was 2.40 and the average family size was 2.95.

26.2% are under the age of 18, 7.1% from 18 to 24, 27.4% from 25 to 44, 24.0% from 45 to 64, and 15.4% who were 65 years of age or older. The median age was 38 years. For every 100 females, there were 101.7 males. For every 100 females age 18 and over, there were 94.6 males.

The median income for a household in the city was $38,333, and the median income for a family was $43,056. Males had a median income of $28,947 versus $25,724 for females. The per capita income for the city was $17,155. About 3.5% of families and 6.1% of the population were below the poverty line, including 9.0% of those under age 18 and 5.6% of those age 65 or over.

== Economy ==
Redfield's economy includes a brickyard, Glen-Gery, which supplied all bricks for the 2004-2006 renovations of Kinnick Stadium. The brickyard closed in October 2019.

== Education ==
It is within the West Central Valley Community School District. The district was established on July 1, 2001, by the merger of the Dexfield Community School District and the Stuart-Menlo Community School District.

In 2004 the WCV board attempted to expel Redfield from the district as Redfield voters consistently voted against school bonds.

== Festivals ==
Redfield celebrates the Old Settlers Celebration in June annually. The festival includes a carnival with many rides, a parade, and a street dance. Class reunions for Redfield and Dexfield high school graduates often occur during Old Settlers.

== Notable person ==
- Rex Harvey, American decathlete

== See also ==
- Raccoon River Valley Trail
