= Guthrie Center Community School District =

Public school district in Guthrie Center, Iowa, United States

Coordinates: 41.670387°N 94.494901°W

Location
- Guthrie Center, Iowa Guthrie County and Audubon County United States
- Coordinates: 41.670387, −94.494901

District information
- Type: Local school district
- Grades: K–12
- Superintendent: Josh Rasmussen
- Schools: 2
- Budget: $8,095,000 (2020-21)
- NCES District ID: 1913320

Students and staff
- Students: 447 (2023-24)
- Teachers: 42.24 FTE
- Staff: 45.61 FTE
- Student–teacher ratio: 10.58
- Athletic conference: West Central Conference
- District mascot: Chargers
- Colors: Black and gold

Other information
- Website: www.acgcschools.org

Guthrie Center Community School District is a rural, public school district headquartered in Guthrie Center, Iowa.

The district is almost entirely in Guthrie County, with a small portion in Audubon County, and serves the city of Guthrie Center and the surrounding rural areas.

It has entered into a "grade-sharing" relationship with Adair–Casey Community School District in which the latter sends its high school students to the Guthrie Center school. Therefore it serves senior high school students from Adair and Casey.

== Schools ==
Schools include:

- Guthrie Center Elementary School
- AC/GC High School

Under grade-sharing, students attend AC/GC Junior High School in Adair.

=== AC/GC High School ===
==== Athletics ====
The Chargers compete in the West Central Activities Conference in the following sports:

- Cross Country
  - Boys' 2021 Class 1A State Champions
- Volleyball
- Football
- Basketball
- Wrestling
- Track and Field
- Golf
- Baseball
- Softball

== See also ==
- List of school districts in Iowa
- List of high schools in Iowa
