= Van Meter Community School District =

Public school district in Van Meter, Iowa, United States

Coordinates: 41.529103°N 93.952958°W

Location
- Van Meter, Iowa Madison County and Dallas County United States
- Coordinates: 41.529103, -93.952958

District information
- Type: Local school district
- Grades: K-12
- Superintendent: Deron Durflinger
- Schools: 3
- Budget: $12,427,000 (2020-21)
- NCES District ID: 1929010

Students and staff
- Students: 1090 (2022-23)
- Teachers: 63.82 FTE
- Staff: 57.02 FTE
- Student–teacher ratio: 17.08
- Athletic conference: West Central
- District mascot: Bulldogs
- Colors: Blue and White

Other information
- Website: www.vmbulldogs.com

The Van Meter Community School District is a rural public school district headquartered in Van Meter, Iowa.

The district spans northern Madison County and southern Dallas County. The district serves Van Meter and the surrounding rural areas.

== Schools ==
The district has three schools in a single facility Van Meter.

- Van Meter Elementary School
- Van Meter Middle School
- Van Meter High School

=== Van Meter High School ===
==== Athletics ====
The Bulldogs compete in the West Central Activities Conference in the following sports:

- Cross Country
  - 2022 Girls Class 2A State Champions
- Volleyball
- Soccer
- Football
  - 2017,2021,2022 Class 1A State Champions and 2023 Class 2A State Champions
- Basketball
- Wrestling
- Track and Field
  - 2022 Girls Class 2A State Champions
- Golf
  - Girls' 2018 Class 2A State Champions
- Baseball
  - 6-time State Champions (1946, 2003, 2019, 2020, 2021, 2022 )
- Softball
  - 2016 and 2025 Class 2A State Champions

== See also ==
- List of school districts in Iowa
- List of high schools in Iowa
