= West Central Valley Community School District =

Public school district in Stuart, Iowa, United States

Coordinates: 41.504705°N 94.301038°W

Location
- Stuart, Iowa Adair, Dallas, and Guthrie counties United States
- Coordinates: 41.504705, -94.301038

District information
- Type: Local school district
- Grades: K-12
- Established: 2001
- Superintendent: Rusty Shockley
- Budget: $16,174,000 (2020-21)
- NCES District ID: 1927500

Students and staff
- Students: 852 (2022-23)
- Teachers: 66.71 FTE
- Staff: 82.36 FTE
- Student–teacher ratio: 12.77
- Athletic conference: West Central
- District mascot: Wildcats
- Colors: Purple and Black

Other information
- Website: wcvwildcats.org

West Central Valley Community School District is a rural public school district headquartered in Stuart, Iowa. The district is located in sections of Adair, Dallas, and Guthrie counties. It serves Stuart, Dexter, Menlo, and Redfield.

The district was established on July 1, 2001, by the merger of the Dexfield Community School District and the Stuart-Menlo Community School District. The two districts previously had a grade-sharing arrangement in which students from one district attended the other district's schools for certain grade levels. In 2003 the district had 950 students.

From 2002 to 2004, several votes for bonds to finance a new high school were voted down. All four major communities opposed the first, and in the second, of the four communities, only those in Stuart had a majority for supporting the bond. In 2004, the district board attempted to expel Redfield as that community's residents voted against school bonds each time.

== Schools ==
- West Central Valley High School (Stuart)
- West Central Valley Middle School (Redfield)
- Dexter Elementary School (Dexter)
- Stuart Elementary School (Stuart)

=== West Central Valley High School ===
==== Athletics ====
The Wildcats compete in the West Central Activities Conference in the following sports:

- Cross Country
- Volleyball
- Football
- Basketball
- Wrestling
- Track and Field
- Golf
- Soccer
- Baseball
- Softball

== See also ==
- List of school districts in Iowa
- List of high schools in Iowa
