= Pride of Iowa Conference =

Iowa High School athletic conference

- Conference: IHSAA / IGHSAU
- Founded: 1987
- Sports fielded: 17
- No. of teams: 8
- Region: Southern Iowa
- Website: www.prideofiowa.org

The Pride of Iowa Conference (POI ) is a high school athletic conference made up of 8 small schools in southern Iowa, United States.

== Current members ==
Institution	Location	Mascot	Colors	Affiliation	2026-2027 BEDS	Football Class
Central Decatur	Leon	Cardinals		Public	128	A
East Union	Afton	Eagles		Public	102	Eight-player
Lenox	Lenox	Tigers		Public	91	Eight-player
Mount Ayr	Mount Ayr	Raiders		Public	115	A*
Nodaway Valley	Greenfield	Wolverines		Public	151	A
Southeast Warren	Liberty Center	Warhawks		Public	97	Eight-player
Southwest Valley	Corning	Timberwolves		Public	148	A
Wayne	Corydon	Falcons		Public	123	Eight-player

Mount Ayr shares a football team with Diagonal.

== History ==
The conference was founded in 1987 with six schools: I-35, Wayne, Central Decatur, Mt. Ayr, Southeast Warren, and East Union. For the first 13 years of its history, the conference was quite small and compact. The conference added Nodaway Valley and Martensdale-St. Mary's in 1997, two schools in the same relative area of the state. In 2000 and 2001, the conference underwent a two-year, four-team expansion that more than doubled the geographical area of the conference. Corning (formerly of the Rolling Hills Conference) and Bedford (Corner Conference) joined in 2000; with Lenox (Rolling Hills Conference) and reaching into the Des Moines Metro Area by adding Pleasantville (Heart of Iowa Conference) in 2001. The conference has remained stable since then only losing two schools since 2001. In the fall of 2013, Corning and Villisca (Corner Conference) became Southwest Valley High School remaining in the Pride of Iowa for all activities. In 2018, founding school Interstate 35 and Pleasantville left the Pride of Iowa conference for the West Central Activities Conference, due to growing enrollment and proximity of schools to the Des Moines Metro, decreasing travel for both schools, especially Pleasantville. Beginning for the 2022-2023 school year, South Page School district will be whole-grade sharing with Bedford for the next 3 years. South Page had previously been associated with Clarinda, who competes in the Hawkeye 10 Conference.

Beginning with the 2024-2025 school year, Bedford left the Pride of Iowa Conference to join the Corner Conference.

On September 18, 2025, the Martensdale-St Marys Community School District voted to join the West Central Activities Conference. The school will join for the 2026-2027 school year.

== State championships ==
Sport	Class	Year(s)	School
Baseball	1A	2004, 2010, 2011, 2012	Martensdale-St. Mary’s
Baseball	1A	2006	Lenox
Boys’ Basketball	2A	2006	Nodaway Valley
Girls’ Basketball	1A	2011	Martensdale-St. Mary’s
Boys’ Cross Country	1A	2002	Nodaway Valley
Girls’ Cross Country	1A	2009	Nodaway Valley
Football	Eight-player	2008	Lenox
Softball	1A	2012	Martensdale-St. Mary’s
Boys’ Track and Field	1A	2014	Mount Ayr
Girls’ Track and Field	1A	1988	Mount Ayr
