= Earlham Community School District =

Public school district in Earlham, Iowa, United States

Coordinates: 41.495336°N 94.123447°W

Location
- Earlham, Iowa Madison County, and Dallas County United States
- Coordinates: 41.495336, -94.123447

District information
- Type: Local school district
- Grades: K-12
- Superintendent: Steve Kaster
- Schools: 3
- Budget: $9,262,000 (2020-21)
- NCES District ID: 1910050

Students and staff
- Students: 635 (2022-23)
- Teachers: 46.80 FTE
- Staff: 48.71 FTE
- Student–teacher ratio: 13.57
- Athletic conference: West Central
- District mascot: Cardinals
- Colors: Royal and Red

Other information
- Website: www.ecsdcards.com

The Earlham Community School District is a rural public school district headquartered in Earlham, Iowa.

The district is mostly in Madison County, but also has an area portions in Dallas County. The district serves Earlham and the surrounding rural areas.

Michael Wright has served as superintendent since 2007, after serving in the same role for Clear Lake Community School District for two years.

== Schools ==
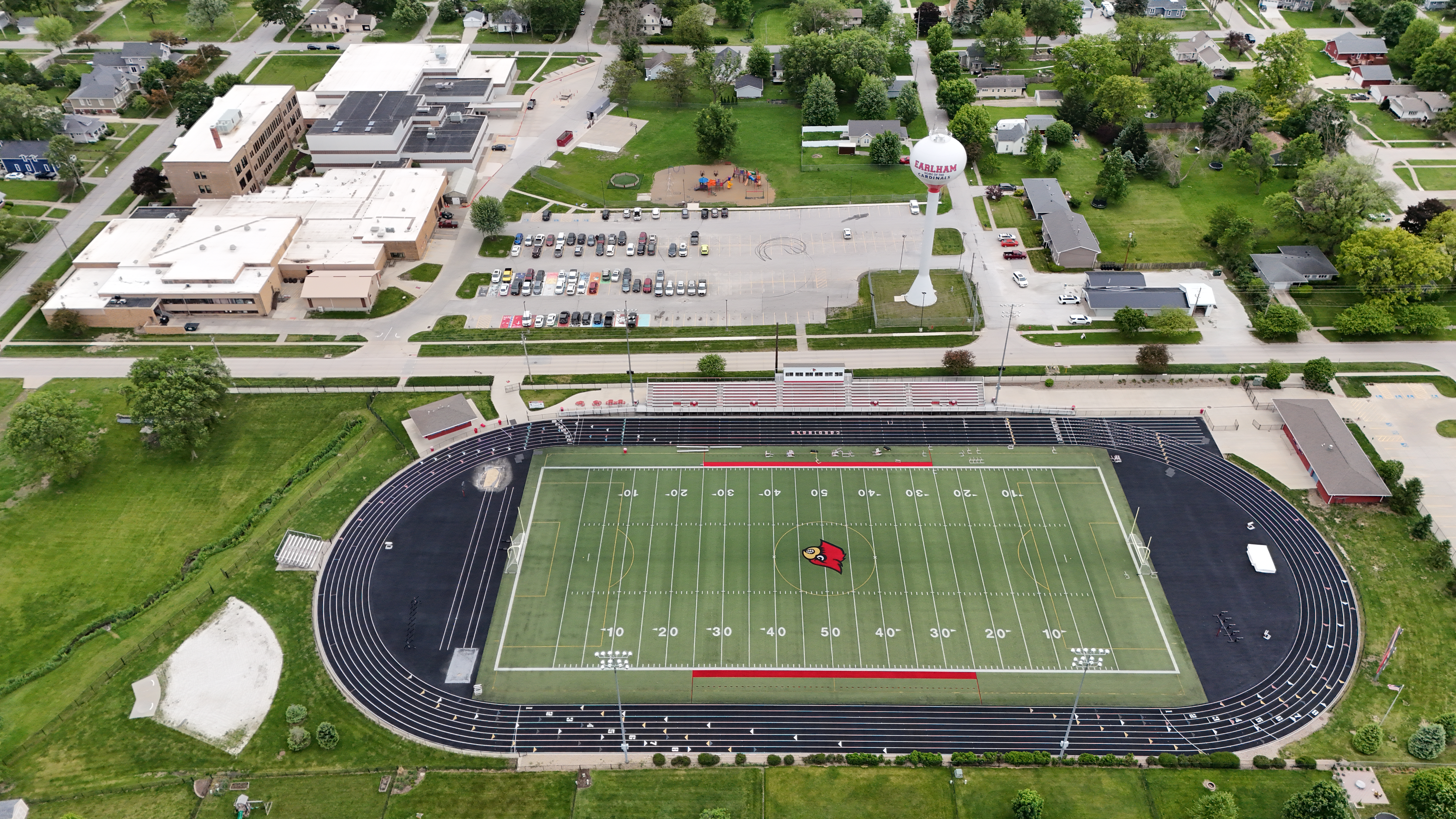
Earlham High School (upper left) and its football field

Earlham is served by the Earlham Community School District. The district has three schools on a single campus in Earlham.

- Earlham Elementary School
- Earlham Middle School
- Earlham Senior High School

=== Earlham High School ===
==== Athletics ====
The Cardinals compete in the West Central Activities Conference in the following sports:

- Cross Country
- Volleyball
- Football
- Basketball
- Wrestling
- Track and Field
  - Boys' 2022 Class 1A State Champions
- Golf
- Baseball
- Softball
  - 2-time State Champions (2009, 2014)

Students from Earlham can also participate in the following sports as part of the teams from Winterset:

- Bowling
- Soccer
- Swimming

== See also ==
- List of school districts in Iowa
- List of high schools in Iowa
