= Essex Community School District =

Public school district in Essex, Iowa, United States

Location
- Essex, Iowa Page County and Montgomery County United States
- Coordinates: 40.8298°N 95.30893°W

District information
- Type: Local school district
- Grades: K-12
- Superintendent: Gregg Cruikshank
- Schools: 2
- Budget: $4,121,000 (2020-21)
- NCES District ID: 1911040

Students and staff
- Students: 206 (2022-23)
- Teachers: 22.15 FTE
- Staff: 26.11 FTE
- Student–teacher ratio: 9.30
- Athletic conference: Corner Conference
- District mascot: Trojans
- Colors: Red and Black

Other information
- Website: www.essex.k12.ia.us

The Essex Community School District based in Essex, Iowa, United States, is a rural public school district serving the town of Essex and surrounding areas in northwestern Page County, with a small area in southern Montgomery County. The District educates students in grades PK-12 in a single campus in Essex. The High school portion of the building was constructed in 1970 and the elementary school was constructed in 1990. Superintendents over the years were" Russell Hilker 1970-2002, William Crilly 2002-2007, Sandra Dop 2007-2009, Ron Flynn 2009-2011, Jim Dick 2011-2014, Paul Croghan 2014-2019 (shared with East Mills), Dr Mike Wells 2019-2025 ( shared with Hamburg), Greg Cruikshank (shared with Hamburg) 2025- present.

The school's mascot is the Trojans. Their colors are red and black.

== Schools ==
The district operates two schools on one campus in Essex:

- Essex Elementary School
- Essex Junior-Senior High School

=== Essex Junior-Senior High School ===
==== Athletics ====
The Trojans compete in the Corner Conference in the following sports:

- Cross Country (boys and girls)
- Volleyball
- Football
- Basketball (boys and girls)
- Wrestling
- Track and Field (boys and girls)
- Baseball
- Softball

== See also ==
- List of school districts in Iowa
- List of high schools in Iowa
