= Interstate 35 Community School District =

Public school district in Truro, Iowa, United States

Location
- Truro, Iowa Clarke, Madison, and Warren counties United States
- Coordinates: 41.21074°N 93.84184°W

District information
- Type: Local school district
- Grades: K-12
- Superintendent: Sharon Dentlinger
- Schools: 3
- Budget: $14,205,000 (2020-21)
- NCES District ID: 1914670

Students and staff
- Students: 842 (2022-23)
- Teachers: 64.04 FTE
- Staff: 83.84 FTE
- Student–teacher ratio: 13.15
- Athletic conference: West Central
- District mascot: Roadrunners
- Colors: Red and Blue

Other information
- Website: www.roadrunnerpride.org

Interstate 35 Community School District is a rural public school district headquartered in Truro, Iowa.

The district, with about 192 square miles (500 km^{2}) of area, occupies sections of Clarke, Madison, and Warren counties; it serves Truro, New Virginia, and St. Charles.

== Schools ==
The district has a single campus in Truro. Its levels are preschool, elementary, and secondary. The high school portion was built in 1981, and by fall 2002 a K-8 addition was scheduled to open.

Previously the preschool and high school were in Truro, the elementary school was in St. Charles, and the middle school was in New Virginia. All elementary and middle school students were scheduled to move to the Truro K-8 facility upon its opening.

=== Interstate 35 High School ===
==== Athletics ====
The Roadrunners compete in the West Central Activities Conference in the following sports:

- Cross Country
- Volleyball
- Football
- Basketball
- Wrestling
- Track and Field
- Golf
- Baseball
- Softball

== Notable alumni ==
Kim Reynolds graduated from Interstate 35 Community School District in 1977. She is the current governor of Iowa.

== See also ==
- List of school districts in Iowa
- List of high schools in Iowa
