= New Virginia, Iowa =

- City
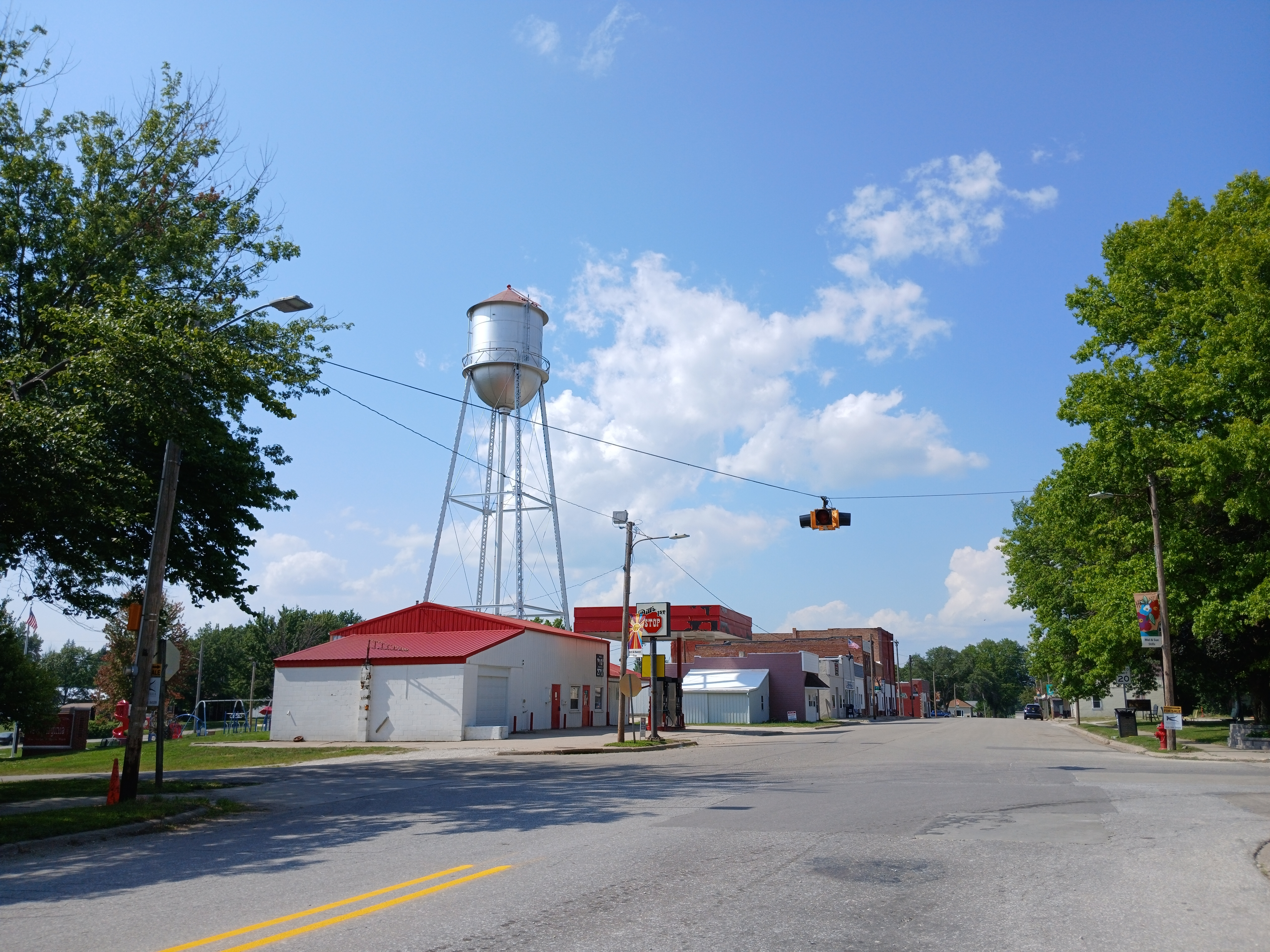
- Downtown New Virginia

- Location of New Virginia, Iowa
- Coordinates: 41°10′54″N 93°43′52″W
- Country: USA
- State: Iowa
- County: Warren

Area
  - Total: 0.45 sq mi (1.17 km^{2})
  - Land: 0.45 sq mi (1.17 km^{2})
  - Water: 0 sq mi (0.00 km^{2})
- Elevation: 1,079 ft (329 m)

Population (2020)
  - Total: 498
  - Density: 1,106.5/sq mi (427.23/km^{2})
- Time zone: UTC-6 (Central (CST))
  - Summer (DST): UTC-5 (CDT)
- ZIP code: 50210
- Area code: 641
- FIPS code: 19-56595
- GNIS feature ID: 2395219
- Website: www.newvirginia.com

New Virginia is a city in Warren County, Iowa, United States. The population was 498 at the time of the 2020 census. It is part of the Des Moines–West Des Moines Metropolitan Statistical Area.

== History ==
New Virginia was laid out in 1856.

== Geography ==
According to the United States Census Bureau, the city has a total area of 0.46 square miles (1.19 km^{2}), all of it land.

== Demographics ==
Historical population
Census	Pop.	Note	%±
1910	396		—
1920	424		7.1%
1930	404		−4.7%
1940	410		1.5%
1950	342		−16.6%
1960	381		11.4%
1970	452		18.6%
1980	512		13.3%
1990	433		−15.4%
2000	469		8.3%
2010	489		4.3%
2020	498		1.8%
U.S. Decennial Census

=== 2020 census ===
As of the census of 2020, there were 498 people, 196 households, and 133 families residing in the city. The population density was 1,107.0 inhabitants per square mile (427.4/km^{2}). There were 219 housing units at an average density of 486.8 per square mile (188.0/km^{2}). The racial makeup of the city was 93.4% White, 0.2% Black or African American, 0.2% Native American, 0.4% Asian, 0.0% Pacific Islander, 0.4% from other races and 5.4% from two or more races. Hispanic or Latino persons of any race comprised 0.8% of the population.

Of the 196 households, 33.2% of which had children under the age of 18 living with them, 50.0% were married couples living together, 8.2% were cohabitating couples, 20.4% had a female householder with no spouse or partner present and 21.4% had a male householder with no spouse or partner present. 32.1% of all households were non-families. 28.1% of all households were made up of individuals, 11.7% had someone living alone who was 65 years old or older.

The median age in the city was 36.9 years. 30.1% of the residents were under the age of 20; 6.2% were between the ages of 20 and 24; 22.7% were from 25 and 44; 22.9% were from 45 and 64; and 18.1% were 65 years of age or older. The gender makeup of the city was 48.6% male and 51.4% female.

=== 2010 census ===
As of the census of 2010, there were 489 people, 196 households, and 134 families living in the city. The population density was 1,058.4 inhabitants per square mile (408.7/km^{2}). There were 216 housing units at an average density of 467.5 per square mile (180.5/km^{2}). The racial makeup of the city was 99.4% White, 0.2% African American, 0.2% Native American, and 0.2% from two or more races. Hispanic or Latino of any race were 0.8% of the population.

There were 196 households, of which 35.7% had children under the age of 18 living with them, 53.1% were married couples living together, 9.2% had a female householder with no husband present, 6.1% had a male householder with no wife present, and 31.6% were non-families. 27.6% of all households were made up of individuals, and 13.3% had someone living alone who was 65 years of age or older. The average household size was 2.49 and the average family size was 3.04.

The median age in the city was 33.3 years. 28.6% of residents were under the age of 18; 6.8% were between the ages of 18 and 24; 28.5% were from 25 to 44; 21.2% were from 45 to 64; and 14.9% were 65 years of age or older. The gender makeup of the city was 51.3% male and 48.7% female.

=== 2000 census ===
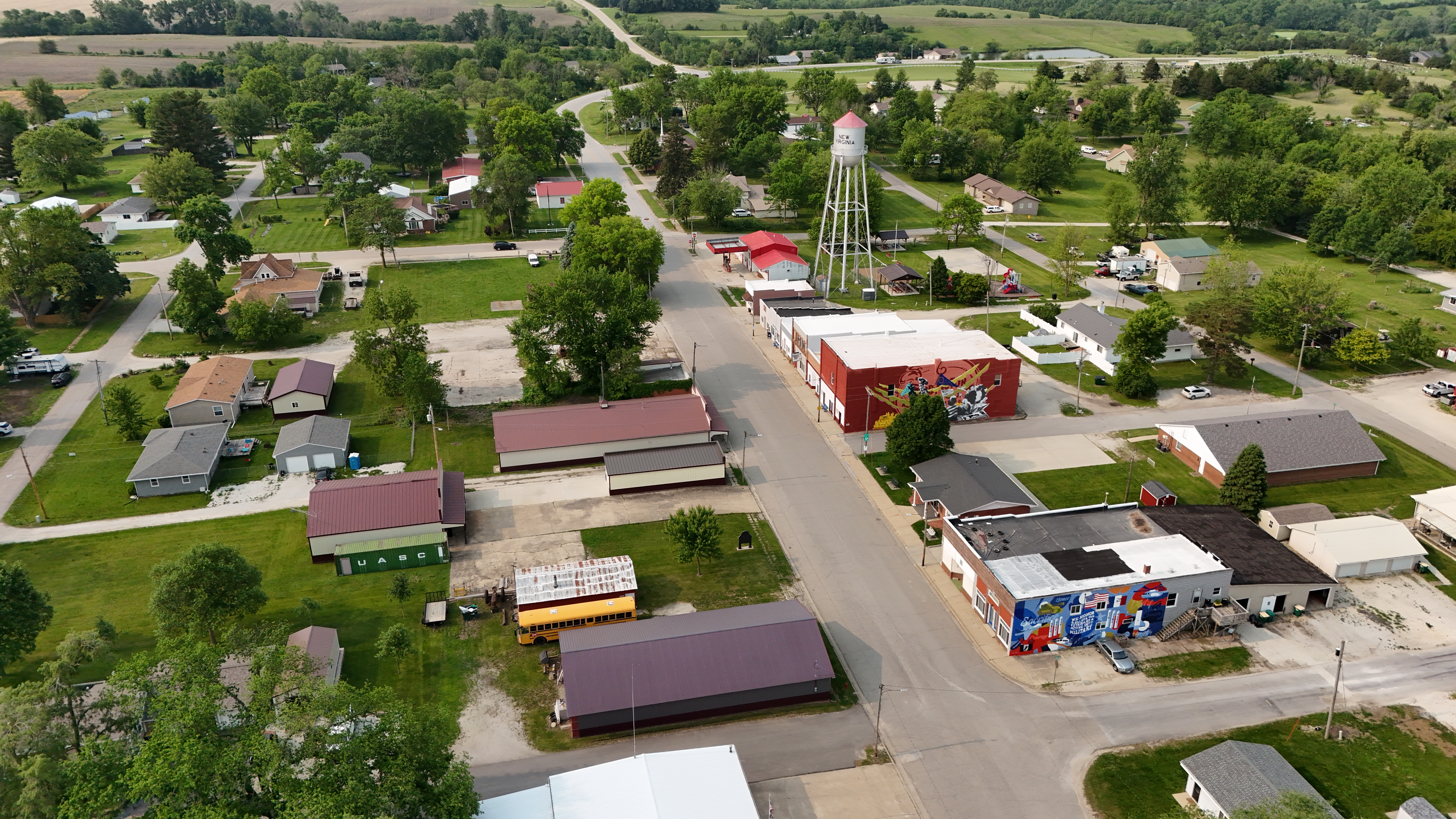
New Virginia business district

As of the census of 2000, there were 469 people, 192 households, and 137 families living in the city. The population density was 1,017.5 inhabitants per square mile (392.9/km^{2}). There were 197 housing units at an average density of 427.4 per square mile (165.0/km^{2}). The racial makeup of the city was 98.08% White, 0.21% Pacific Islander, and 1.71% from two or more races. Hispanic or Latino of any race were 0.21% of the population.

There were 192 households, out of which 31.8% had children under the age of 18 living with them, 60.4% were married couples living together, 5.2% had a female householder with no husband present, and 28.6% were non-families. 23.4% of all households were made up of individuals, and 14.1% had someone living alone who was 65 years of age or older. The average household size was 2.44 and the average family size was 2.89.

In the city, the population was spread out, with 23.5% under the age of 18, 8.1% from 18 to 24, 29.4% from 25 to 44, 25.2% from 45 to 64, and 13.9% who were 65 years of age or older. The median age was 37 years. For every 100 females, there were 106.6 males. For every 100 females age 18 and over, there were 102.8 males.

The median income for a household in the city was $38,750, and the median income for a family was $47,500. Males had a median income of $36,042 versus $26,625 for females. The per capita income for the city was $20,803. About 8.1% of families and 9.9% of the population were below the poverty line, including 13.6% of those under age 18 and 8.0% of those age 65 or over.

== Education ==
Interstate 35 Community School District serves the municipality.
