= Corner Conference (Iowa) =

High school athletic conference in Iowa

- Conference: IHSAA / IGHSAU
- Founded: 1953
- Sports fielded: 13
- No. of teams: 8
- Region: Southwest Iowa
- Website: www.cornerconference.org

The Corner Conference is a high school athletic conference based in Southwestern Iowa. All members are in Class 1A (the smallest schools in Iowa).

== Members ==
School	Location	Affiliation	Mascot	Colors	2026-2027 BEDS	Football class*
Bedford	Bedford	Public	Bulldogs		89	8-man
East Mills	Malvern	Public	Wolverines		89	8-man
Essex	Essex	Public	Trojans & Trojanettes		41	8-man*
Fremont–Mills	Tabor	Public	Knights		98	8-man
Griswold	Griswold	Public	Tigers		76	8-man
Hamburg	Hamburg	Charter	Wildcats		45	N/A
Sidney	Sidney	Public	Cowboys & Cowgirls		101	8-man
Stanton	Stanton	Public	Vikings & Viqueens		50	8-man*

* Essex and Stanton compete together in football as Stanton/Essex

== History ==
- In 1953, original 6 members Farragut, Sidney, Hamburg, Essex, Malvern, and Tabor form the Corner Conference.
- In 1959, Tabor merged with Bartlett, Randolph, and Thurman to become Fremont–Mills. New Market and South Page join, membership is at 8.
- In 1960, Stanton joins from the Tri-County Conference to make membership 9.
- In 1961, Nishna Valley joins from the Mills County Conference; 10 schools.
- In 1987, Carson-Macedonia joins from the Rolling Hills Conference; 11 schools.
- In 1988, Villisca joins from the Tall Corn Conference; membership is at 12 schools.
- In 1989, New Market closed its high school, dropping membership to 11.
- In 1992, Bedford joins from the Tall Corn Conference, bringing membership back up to 12.
- In 1993, Carson-Macedonia merged with Oakland to become Riverside Community School District, and left to join the Western Iowa Conference. Membership is 11.
- In 2000, Bedford then left the Corner Conference for the Pride of Iowa Conference. Membership drops to 10.
- In 2004, Clarinda Academy joined, bringing membership up to 11.
- In 2007, Malvern entered sports sharing with Nishna Valley, known as "East Mills", which stays in the conference. Membership is at 10.
- In 2010, Farragut and Hamburg entered sports sharing, known as "Nishnabotna". The new team stays in the conference, bringing membership down to 9.
- In 2011, Heartland Christian joined, bringing membership back up to 10, although for some sports they pair with St. Albert's in the Hawkeye 10 Conference. The co-op of Malvern and Nishna Valley known as "East Mills" is officially reorganized into one single school district with the same name.
- In 2012, "Nishnabotna" schools Farragut and Hamburg enter official whole-grade sharing. There had been discussions with Sidney to eventually form a three school sharing agreement, but did not happen.
- In 2013, Villisca entered whole-grade sharing with Pride of Iowa Conference member Corning, to be known as Southwest Valley, and would compete in the Pride of Iowa Conference. Membership drops to 9.
- In 2016, the Farragut-Hamburg partnership known as "Nishnabotna" was dissolved; the entire Farragut school district was forcibly shut down by the state, and Hamburg closed its high school. Membership drops to 8.
- In 2018, Griswold School joined to bring membership up to 9.
- In 2019, South Page ceased independent athletic teams at the end of the year and was essentially absorbed by Clarinda. Membership drops to 8.
- In 2020, Heartland Christian left for The Frontier Conference of Nebraska. Membership is now at 7.
- In 2021, Clarinda Academy was closed. Membership drops to 6.
- In 2022, Hamburg reopened as a charter school and currently competes as a member of the Corner Conference. Membership increased to 7.
- In 2023, Bedford School is set to join the Corner Conference from the Pride of Iowa Conference with the start of the 2024-2025 school year. Membership will increase to 8.
