= Menlo, Iowa =

- City
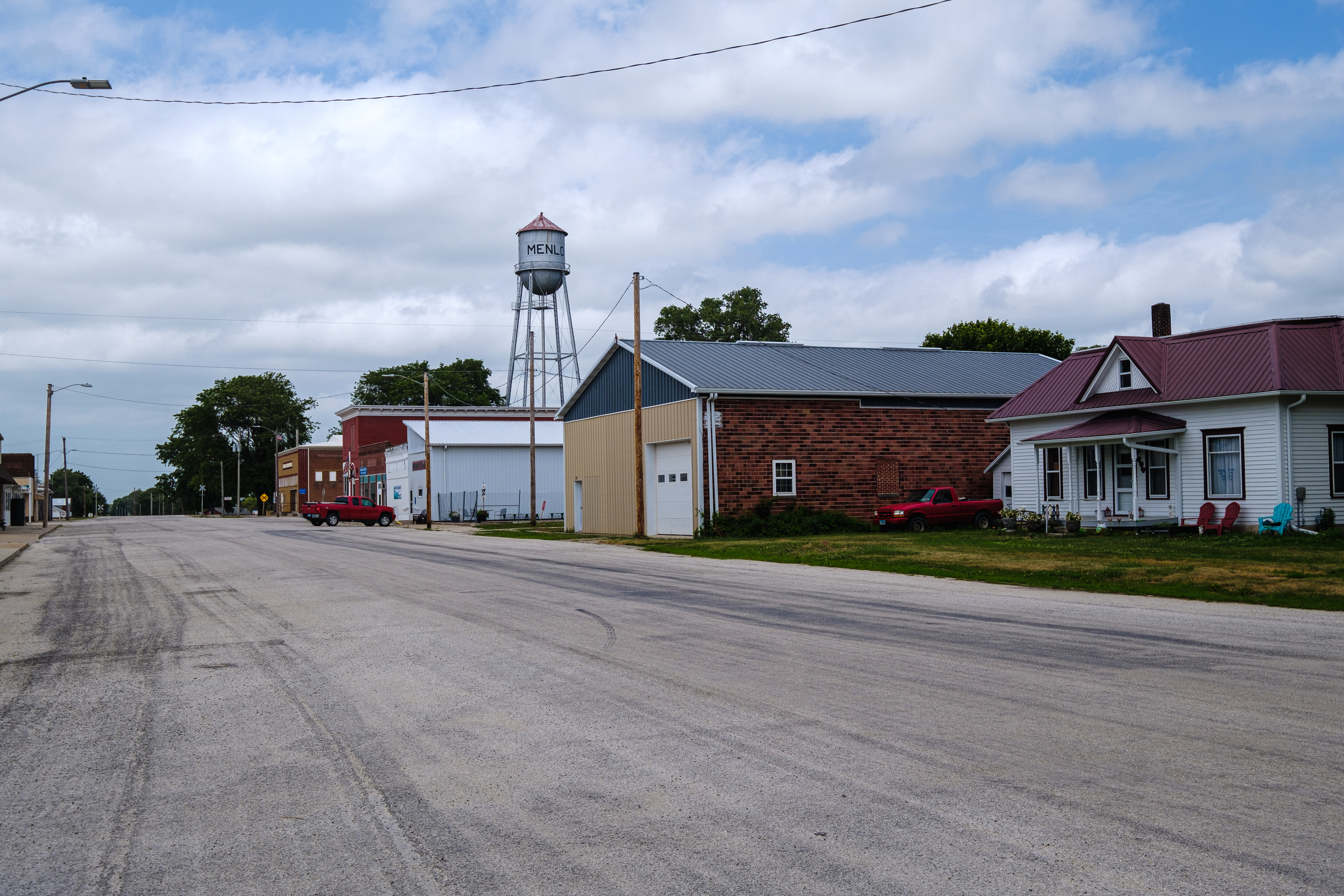
- Sherman Street

- Location of Menlo, Iowa
- Coordinates: 41°31′20″N 94°24′16″W
- Country: USA
- State: Iowa
- County: Guthrie

Area
  - Total: 0.45 sq mi (1.17 km^{2})
  - Land: 0.45 sq mi (1.17 km^{2})
  - Water: 0 sq mi (0.00 km^{2})
- Elevation: 1,260 ft (380 m)

Population (2020)
  - Total: 345
  - Density: 766.1/sq mi (295.79/km^{2})
- Time zone: UTC-6 (Central (CST))
  - Summer (DST): UTC-5 (CDT)
- ZIP code: 50164
- Area code: 641
- FIPS code: 19-51105
- GNIS feature ID: 2395098
- Website: www.cityofmenloia.com

Menlo is a city in Guthrie County, Iowa, United States. The population was 345 at the time of the 2020 census. It is part of the Des Moines metropolitan area.

== History ==
Menlo was laid out in 1869. Menlo was first called "The Switch" and then "Guthrie Switch", but it was finally renamed Menlo in order to prevent confusion with Guthrie Center.

== Geography ==
According to the United States Census Bureau, the city has a total area of 0.47 square miles (1.22 km^{2}), all land.

== Demographics ==
Historical populations
Year	Pop.	±%
1890	389	—
1900	428	+10.0%
1910	382	−10.7%
1920	476	+24.6%
1930	500	+5.0%
1940	441	−11.8%
1950	421	−4.5%
1960	421	+0.0%
1970	391	−7.1%
1980	410	+4.9%
1990	356	−13.2%
2000	365	+2.5%
2010	353	−3.3%
2020	345	−2.3%
Source:"U.S. Census website". United States Census Bureau. and Iowa Data Center; Source: U.S. Decennial Census

=== 2020 census ===
As of the census of 2020, there were 345 people, 140 households, and 94 families residing in the city. The population density was 766.1 inhabitants per square mile (295.8/km^{2}). There were 158 housing units at an average density of 350.8 per square mile (135.5/km^{2}). The racial makeup of the city was 91.6% White, 0.0% Black or African American, 0.9% Native American, 0.0% Asian, 0.0% Pacific Islander, 2.0% from other races and 5.5% from two or more races. Hispanic or Latino persons of any race comprised 0.9% of the population.

Of the 140 households, 37.1% of which had children under the age of 18 living with them, 46.4% were married couples living together, 7.9% were cohabitating couples, 27.9% had a female householder with no spouse or partner present and 17.9% had a male householder with no spouse or partner present. 32.9% of all households were non-families. 27.1% of all households were made up of individuals, 10.0% had someone living alone who was 65 years old or older.

The median age in the city was 38.9 years. 28.4% of the residents were under the age of 20; 7.2% were between the ages of 20 and 24; 23.2% were from 25 and 44; 25.2% were from 45 and 64; and 15.9% were 65 years of age or older. The gender makeup of the city was 47.2% male and 52.8% female.

=== 2010 census ===
As of the census of 2010, there were 353 people, 147 households, and 91 families living in the city. The population density was 751.1 inhabitants per square mile (290.0/km^{2}). There were 161 housing units at an average density of 342.6 per square mile (132.3/km^{2}). The racial makeup of the city was 97.2% White, 0.3% African American, 0.6% Asian, 0.3% from other races, and 1.7% from two or more races. Hispanic or Latino of any race were 1.4% of the population.

There were 147 households, of which 30.6% had children under the age of 18 living with them, 52.4% were married couples living together, 4.1% had a female householder with no husband present, 5.4% had a male householder with no wife present, and 38.1% were non-families. 34.0% of all households were made up of individuals, and 13.6% had someone living alone who was 65 years of age or older. The average household size was 2.40 and the average family size was 3.10.

The median age in the city was 37.7 years. 26.3% of residents were under the age of 18; 5.1% were between the ages of 18 and 24; 28.3% were from 25 to 44; 25.2% were from 45 to 64; and 15% were 65 years of age or older. The gender makeup of the city was 50.1% male and 49.9% female.

=== 2000 census ===
As of the census of 2000, there were 365 people, 144 households, and 101 families living in the city. The population density was 779.7 inhabitants per square mile (301.0/km^{2}). There were 161 housing units at an average density of 343.9 per square mile (132.8/km^{2}). The racial makeup of the city was 98.36% White, and 1.64% from two or more races. Hispanic or Latino of any race were 0.55% of the population.

There were 144 households, out of which 31.3% had children under the age of 18 living with them, 56.3% were married couples living together, 6.3% had a female householder with no husband present, and 29.2% were non-families. 26.4% of all households were made up of individuals, and 13.9% had someone living alone who was 65 years of age or older. The average household size was 2.53 and the average family size was 3.02.

In the city, the population was spread out, with 26.8% under the age of 18, 7.7% from 18 to 24, 27.9% from 25 to 44, 21.6% from 45 to 64, and 15.9% who were 65 years of age or older. The median age was 37 years. For every 100 females, there were 93.1 males. For every 100 females age 18 and over, there were 96.3 males.

The median income for a household in the city was $29,375, and the median income for a family was $31,875. Males had a median income of $27,813 versus $21,058 for females. The per capita income for the city was $17,990. About 5.2% of families and 7.4% of the population were below the poverty line, including 1.2% of those under age 18 and 13.6% of those age 65 or over.

== Education ==
Menlo is within the West Central Valley Community School District. The district was established on July 1, 2001 by the merger of the Stuart-Menlo Community School District and the Dexfield Community School District. The former was established on July 1, 1971 by the merger of the Stuart and Menlo school districts.

== Government ==
Carol Sheldahl was elected mayor in 2022 and will serve until 2024.
