= Madrid High School =

Coordinates: 41.884°N 93.814°W

Location
- 599 Kennedy Street; Madrid, Iowa 50156; United States

Information
- Type: Public secondary School
- Established: 1883
- School district: Madrid Community School District
- Superintendent: Jason Gabel
- Principal: Kelly Williamson
- Faculty: 15.18 FTE
- Grades: 9–12
- Student to teacher ratio: 13.18
- Campus type: Rural
- Colors: Orange and Black
- Athletics conference: West Central
- Mascot: Tiger
- Website: www.madrid.k12.ia.us

Madrid High School is a public high school located in Madrid, Iowa, part of the Madrid Community School District.

The mascot of Madrid High School (MHS) is the Tiger, and the school colors are orange and black. The school fight song is set to the tune of the Notre Dame Victory March,

== Athletics ==
Until 2007, the Tigers competed in the Heart of Iowa Conference. Madrid currently competes in the West Central Conference.

Madrid has a history in football over the past quarter century, making an appearance in the state playoffs 26 out of the past 27 years. Those appearances include 7 semi-final appearances, 8 state championship game appearances and 1 state championship in 1991. Coach Randy Hinkel lead the Tiger program from 1987 until his sudden death in 2015 and compiled a 266–60 record as coach of the Tigers. Hinkel is one of 12 coaches in Iowa high school history with over 300 career wins.

Madrid also has a history in track with 7 won state titles (2001, 2002, 2009, 2010, 2011, 2017(tie), 2021).

Boys' 3-time Class 1A State Cross Country Champions (2018, 2019, 2020)

== Academic/Other Activities ==
Notable clubs at Madrid High School include National Honor Society (NHS), Family, Career and Community Leaders of America (FCCLA), Spanish Club and Book Club.

Madrid also provides activities such as performing arts, choir, band, and speech.
