= Andrew Community School District =

School district in Iowa

Coordinates: 42.152671°N 90.590714°W

Location
- Andrew, Iowa Jackson County United States
- Coordinates: 42.152671, -90.590714

District information
- Type: Local school district
- Grades: PK-6
- Superintendent: Lincoln Veach
- Schools: 2
- Budget: $4,231,000 (2020-21)
- NCES District ID: 1903630

Students and staff
- Students: 147 (2022-23)
- Teachers: 13.95 FTE
- Staff: 20.89 FTE
- Student–teacher ratio: 10.54
- District mascot: Hawks
- Colors: Black and Yellow

Other information
- Website: www.andrew.k12.ia.us

The Andrew Community School District is a public school district headquartered in Andrew, Iowa. The district is completely within Jackson County and serves the town of Andrew and the surrounding rural areas.

Chris Fee became superintendent of both Andrew and Easton Valley Community School District in 2016.

== Schools ==
The district operates two schools in Andrew:

- Andrew Elementary School
- Andrew Middle School

Students from Andrew attend high school at either Bellevue or Maquoketa.

== Enrollment ==
View source data.
