= Madrid Community School District =

School district in Iowa, USA

Coordinates: 41.877866°N 93.822549°W

Location
- Madrid, Iowa Boone, Dallas and Polk counties United States
- Coordinates: 41.877866, -93.822549

District information
- Type: Local school district
- Grades: K–12
- Superintendent: Jason Gabel
- Schools: 2
- Budget: $11,941,000 (2020-21)
- NCES District ID: 1918180

Students and staff
- Students: 684 (2022-23)
- Teachers: 55.89 FTE
- Staff: 51.07 FTE
- Student–teacher ratio: 12.24
- Athletic conference: West Central Conference
- District mascot: Tigers
- Colors: Orange and Black

Other information
- Website: www.madrid.k12.ia.us

The Madrid Community School District, or Madrid Community Schools, is a rural, public school district headquartered in Madrid, Iowa.

The district spans southern Boone County, northeast Dallas County and northwest Polk County. It serves Madrid and the surrounding rural areas.

== Schools ==
The district operates three schools, all in Madrid:

- Madrid Elementary School
- Madrid Junior High School
- Madrid High School
