= Dunkerton, Iowa =

- City
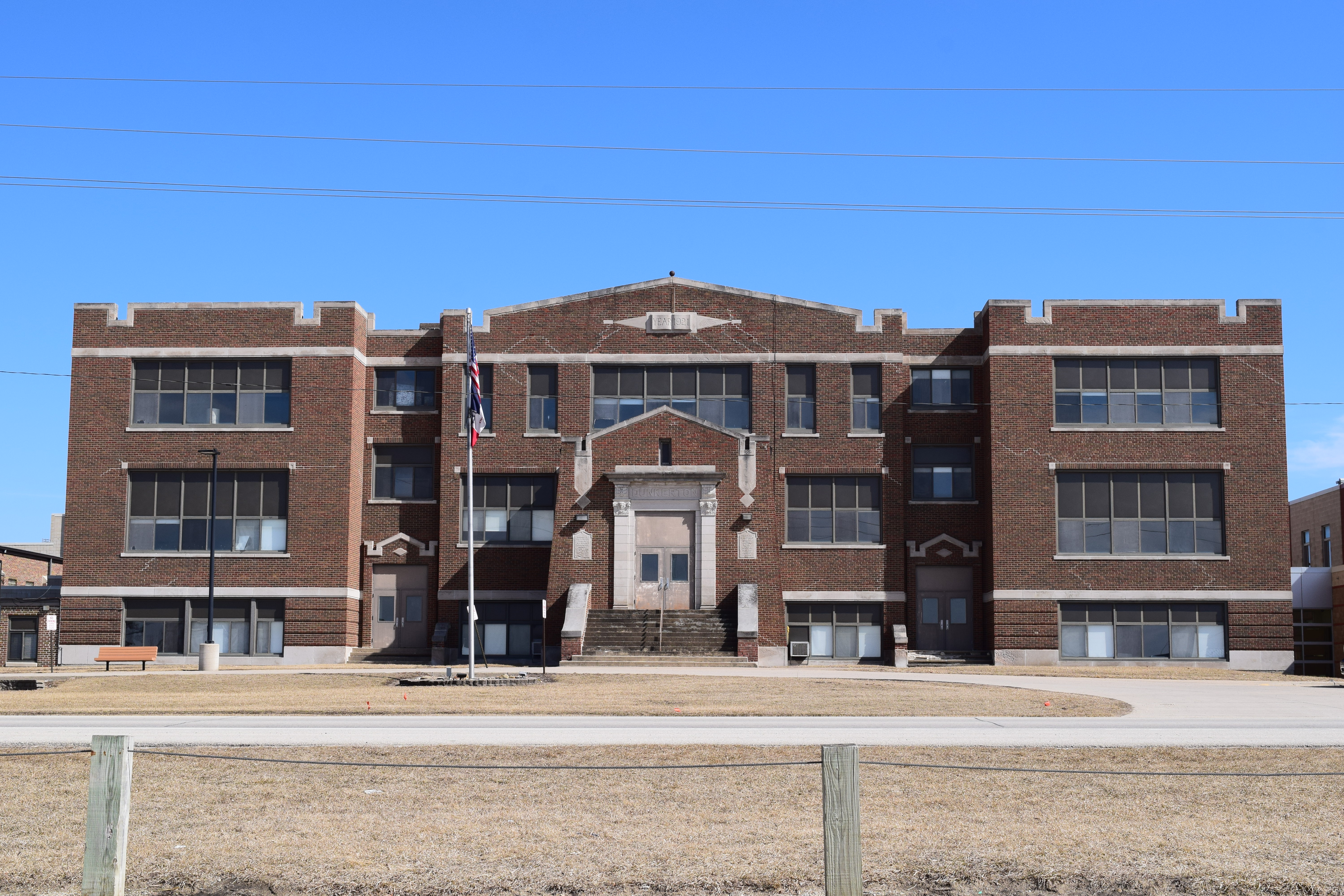
- Dunkerton High School

- Location of Dunkerton, Iowa
- Coordinates: 42°34′04″N 92°09′39″W
- Country: US
- State: Iowa
- County: Black Hawk
- Incorporated: March 18, 1899

Area
  - Total: 1.14 sq mi (2.95 km^{2})
  - Land: 1.13 sq mi (2.93 km^{2})
  - Water: 0.012 sq mi (0.03 km^{2})
- Elevation: 984 ft (300 m)

Population (2020)
  - Total: 842
  - Density: 744.5/sq mi (287.44/km^{2})
- Time zone: UTC-6 (Central (CST))
  - Summer (DST): UTC-5 (CDT)
- ZIP code: 50626
- Area code: 319
- FIPS code: 19-22845
- GNIS feature ID: 2394575
- Website: www.cityofdunkerton.org

Dunkerton is a city in Black Hawk County, Iowa, United States. The population was 842 at the time of the 2020 census. It is part of the Waterloo–Cedar Falls Metropolitan Statistical Area.

== History ==
The story of the settling of Lester Township, Black Hawk County, Iowa, begins with the arrival of Jonathan Owen and his wife Hannah to Illinois in 1850 where land was selling for $20 an acre. The Owens sent their son, Eli, on to Iowa where the land was cheaper. Eli staked his claim on 40 acres in what is now Lester Township, four miles north of the current town of Dunkerton. The following year Jonathan Owen, Philander Canfield, and Alonzo Barber came from Illinois and staked their claims for land in Lester Township at the Federal Land Office Dubuque for $1.25 an acre. In 1853, the Owen family, Philander Canfield, and Alonzo Barber came from Illinois with ox-drawn wagons to settle in the area. More families arrived in 1854–1855.

The village that sprang up near these first settlers in northern Lester Township was named Lester (sometimes referred to as Lester Center) and was located two and one-half miles north of the current town of Dunkerton.

In 1853, two brothers, James and John Dunkerton arrived from Ohio to stake out a claim of land in Lester Township. On August 22, 1854, John died and was one of the first to be buried in the Lester Township cemetery. James remained and built up his land. On December 25, 1854, he married Christiana Hodges.

In 1886 the Chicago Great Western Railway was being built between Oelwein, Iowa and Waterloo, Iowa. There were two proposed locations for a station in Lester Township. On September 22, 1886, A. S. Cummings, as spokesman, met with the Board of Supervisors and railroad officials to ask that the station be built on the Mary French property (south half of northeast corner of Section 27). At the same time, Mr. and Mrs. James Dunkerton were boarding the surveyors working for the railroad. These men were so pleased with the Dunkerton's hospitality that they recommended the route cross the Dunkerton farm. Mr. Dunkerton made the company an offer that if the railroad crossed his farm, and if a station named Dunkerton was located on it, he would donate the right of way through his land. Otherwise, the company would be required to pay for the land they crossed. His offer was accepted, and grading began in August and was completed December 1, 1886.

On October 19, 1886, the town of Dunkerton was surveyed and platted by John Ball, the Black Hawk County surveyor. The plat was filed and recorded. The town was called Dunkerton to coincide with the name of the railroad station. Several villages in the surrounding area (Lester, Blakeville, Barclay, Frogtown, and Gresham) gradually ceased to exist as businesses and homes moved to Dunkerton to be near the railroad.

In 1899, A.S. Cummings took the steps necessary to have the town incorporated. John A. Campbell was the first mayor, E.W. Magee Sr. the town clerk, and C.M. Roberts the treasurer.

=== Attractions ===
Dunkerton History Museum

The Dunkerton History Museum is located in the lower level of the Dunkerton Public Library, 203 E. Tower Street. The museum board is currently in the process of restoring three historic buildings in the lots to the east of the library: the Barclay #3 one-room school, which will become an extension of the museum and house historic displays; the Gresham (Bennington #1) school, which will be restored as a reproduction of a one-room school and a venue for hosting one-room school experiences; and the Lincoln Depot, which will tell the story of the railroad serving as the catalyst for the founding of the town of Dunkerton in 1886. Hours of the museum coincide with the library's open hours.

Parks

The city maintains four parks, including Charma Park, Eagle Scout Park, Gazebo Park, and Carol Hauptly Memorial Park, as well as Mixdorf Nature Preserve and the Dunkerton Sportsman's Club.

Historic Bridge

The historic Dunkerton Bridge spans Crane Creek, connecting Charma Park to the city. The pedestrian bridge was built in 1909 and is still usable today.

Veterans Memorial Park

The Dunkerton Veterans Memorial Park on Main Street replaced an earlier hand-painted billboard containing the names of Dunkerton residents who had served in the military. The new monument, built in the early 2000s, allows families to purchase a brick engraved with the name of a veteran and details of their service. As of October 2003, there were 297 such bricks.

== Arts and culture ==
Dunkerton Days Annual Festival

Dunkerton celebrates "Dunkerton Days" in late July, with a car show, parade, mud volleyball tournament, fishing derby, and bike races, among other activities. The highlight of Dunkerton Days is the fireworks show which brings many people from surrounding areas. Newly added to Dunkerton Days is the Rust + Dust Market, which is a flea market bringing people who like junk from all over Iowa.

=== Dunkerton Public Library ===
After many years of city planning and fundraising, the Dunkerton Public Library was rebuilt out of the flood zone and opened its doors in December, 2010. The new facility includes computers, expanded inventory, and a special children's section.

== Geography ==
According to the United States Census Bureau, the city has a total area of 0.99 square miles (2.56 km^{2}), of which 0.98 square miles (2.54 km^{2}) is land and 0.01 square miles (0.03 km^{2}) is water.

== Demographics ==
Historical populations
Year	Pop.	±%
1900	217	—
1910	276	+27.2%
1920	295	+6.9%
1930	327	+10.8%
1940	360	+10.1%
1950	409	+13.6%
1960	507	+24.0%
1970	563	+11.0%
1980	718	+27.5%
1990	746	+3.9%
2000	749	+0.4%
2010	852	+13.8%
2020	842	−1.2%
Source:"U.S. Census website". United States Census Bureau. and Iowa Data Center; Source: U.S. Decennial Census

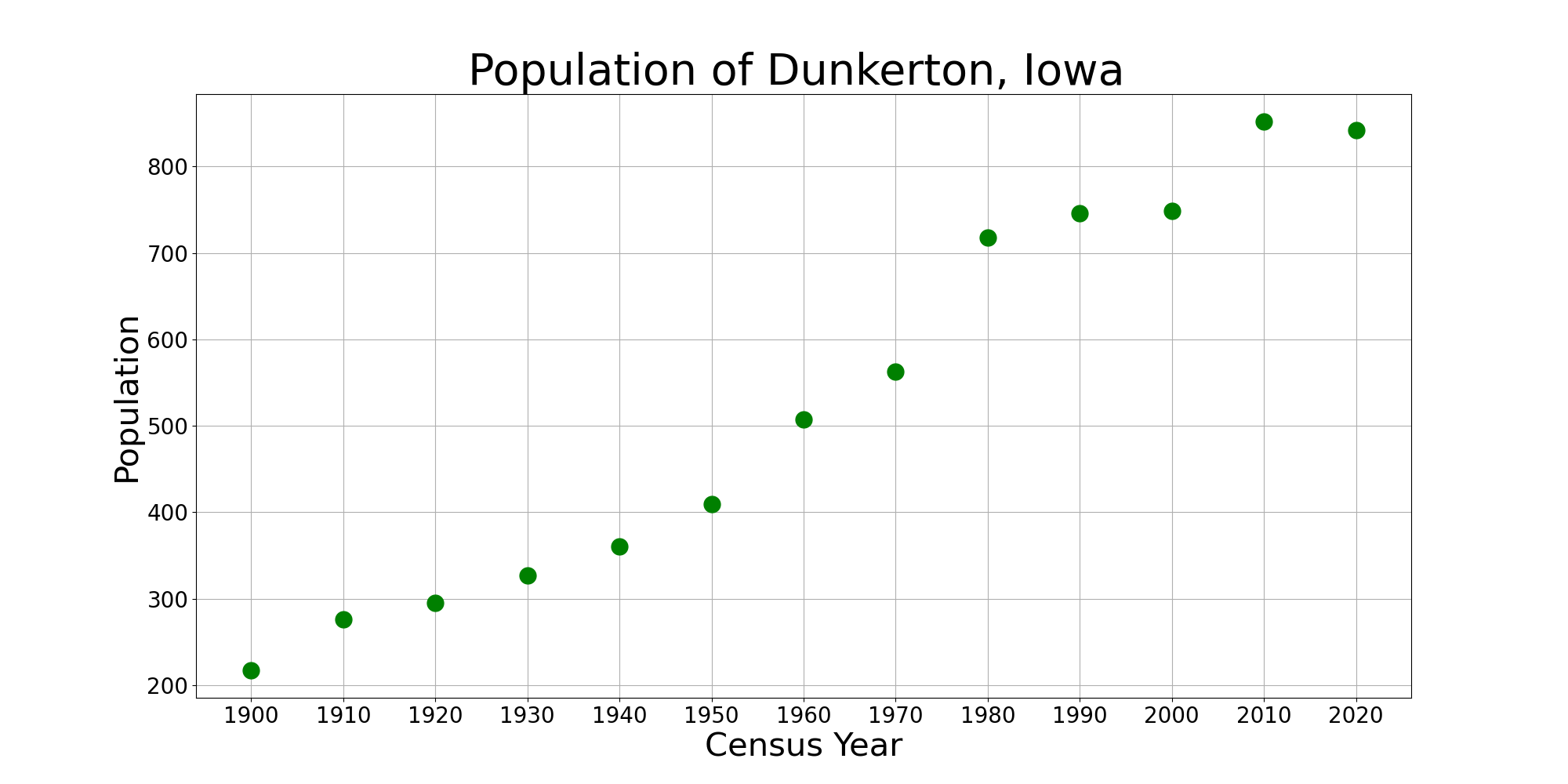
The population of Dunkerton, Iowa from US census data

=== 2020 census ===
As of the census of 2020, there were 842 people, 337 households, and 237 families residing in the city. The population density was 744.5 inhabitants per square mile (287.4/km^{2}). There were 357 housing units at an average density of 315.6 per square mile (121.9/km^{2}). The racial makeup of the city was 95.0% White, 0.1% Black or African American, 0.0% Native American, 0.4% Asian, 0.0% Pacific Islander, 0.0% from other races and 4.5% from two or more races. Hispanic or Latino persons of any race comprised 1.4% of the population.

Of the 337 households, 38.0% of which had children under the age of 18 living with them, 55.2% were married couples living together, 7.1% were cohabitating couples, 20.5% had a female householder with no spouse or partner present and 17.2% had a male householder with no spouse or partner present. 29.7% of all households were non-families. 25.2% of all households were made up of individuals, 10.4% had someone living alone who was 65 years old or older.

The median age in the city was 38.3 years. 29.7% of the residents were under the age of 20; 5.1% were between the ages of 20 and 24; 23.4% were from 25 and 44; 25.8% were from 45 and 64; and 16.0% were 65 years of age or older. The gender makeup of the city was 48.5% male and 51.5% female.

=== 2010 census ===
As of the census of 2010, there were 852 people, 327 households, and 237 families residing in the city. The population density was 869.4 inhabitants per square mile (335.7/km^{2}). There were 338 housing units at an average density of 344.9 per square mile (133.2/km^{2}). The racial makeup of the city was 96.1% White, 1.1% African American, 0.7% Asian, 0.4% from other races, and 1.8% from two or more races. Hispanic or Latino of any race were 2.6% of the population.

There were 327 households, of which 38.2% had children under the age of 18 living with them, 59.6% were married couples living together, 9.5% had a female householder with no husband present, 3.4% had a male householder with no wife present, and 27.5% were non-families. 24.5% of all households were made up of individuals, and 9.5% had someone living alone who was 65 years of age or older. The average household size was 2.61 and the average family size was 3.13.

The median age in the city was 35.3 years. 29.1% of residents were under the age of 18; 8.2% were between the ages of 18 and 24; 26.7% were from 25 to 44; 25.3% were from 45 to 64; and 10.8% were 65 years of age or older. The gender makeup of the city was 48.2% male and 51.8% female.

=== 2000 census ===
As of the census of 2000, there were 749 people, 269 households, and 206 families. The population density was 792.9 inhabitants per square mile (306.1/km^{2}). There were 292 housing units at an average density of 309.1 per square mile (119.3/km^{2}). The racial makeup of the city was 96.26% White, 0.13% Native American, 1.20% Asian, 1.34% Pacific Islander, 0.80% from other races, and 0.27% from two or more races. Hispanic or Latino of any race were 0.80% of the population.

There were 269 households, out of which 41.6% had children under the age of 18 living with them, 66.2% were married couples living together, 7.8% had a female householder with no husband present, and 23.4% were non-families. 19.0% of all households were made up of individuals, and 8.2% had someone living alone who was 65 years of age or older. The average household size was 2.78 and the average family size was 3.18.

Age spread: 29.0% under the age of 18, 8.9% from 18 to 24, 30.4% from 25 to 44, 23.4% from 45 to 64, and 8.3% who were 65 years of age or older. The median age was 33 years. For every 100 females, there were 99.7 males. For every 100 females age 18 and over, there were 102.3 males.

The median income for a household in the city was $41,771, and the median income for a family was $48,229. Males had a median income of $31,083 versus $24,167 for females. The per capita income for the city was $15,863. About 4.4% of families and 5.9% of the population were below the poverty line, including 11.2% of those under age 18 and 3.5% of those age 65 or over.
