= Pleasantville Community School District =

Public school district in Pleasantville, Iowa, United States

Coordinates: 41.388141°N 93.272845°W

Location
- Pleasantville, Iowa Marion County and Warren County United States
- Coordinates: 41.388141, -93.272845

District information
- Type: Local school district
- Grades: K-12
- Superintendent: Dr. Tony Aylsworth
- Schools: 3
- Budget: $11,387,000 (2020-21)
- NCES District ID: 1923160

Students and staff
- Students: 779 (2022-23)
- Teachers: 56.36 FTE
- Staff: 64.08 FTE
- Student–teacher ratio: 13.82
- Athletic conference: West Central
- District mascot: Trojans
- Colors: Orange and Black

Other information
- Website: www.pvillecsd.org

The Pleasantville Community School District is a rural public school district headquartered in Pleasantville, Iowa.

The district spans western Marion County and eastern Warren County. The district serves Pleasantville, Beech, Swan, and the surrounding rural areas.

== Schools ==
The district has three schools in Pleasantville.

- Pleasantville Elementary School
- Pleasantville Middle School
- Pleasantville Senior High School

=== Pleasantville High School ===
==== Athletics ====
The Trojans compete in the West Central Activities Conference in the following sports:

- Cross Country
- Volleyball
- Football
- Basketball
- Wrestling
- Track and Field
- Golf
  - Girls' 2-time State Champions (1993, 2011)
- Baseball
- Softball

== See also ==
- List of school districts in Iowa
- List of high schools in Iowa
