= Truro, Iowa =

- City
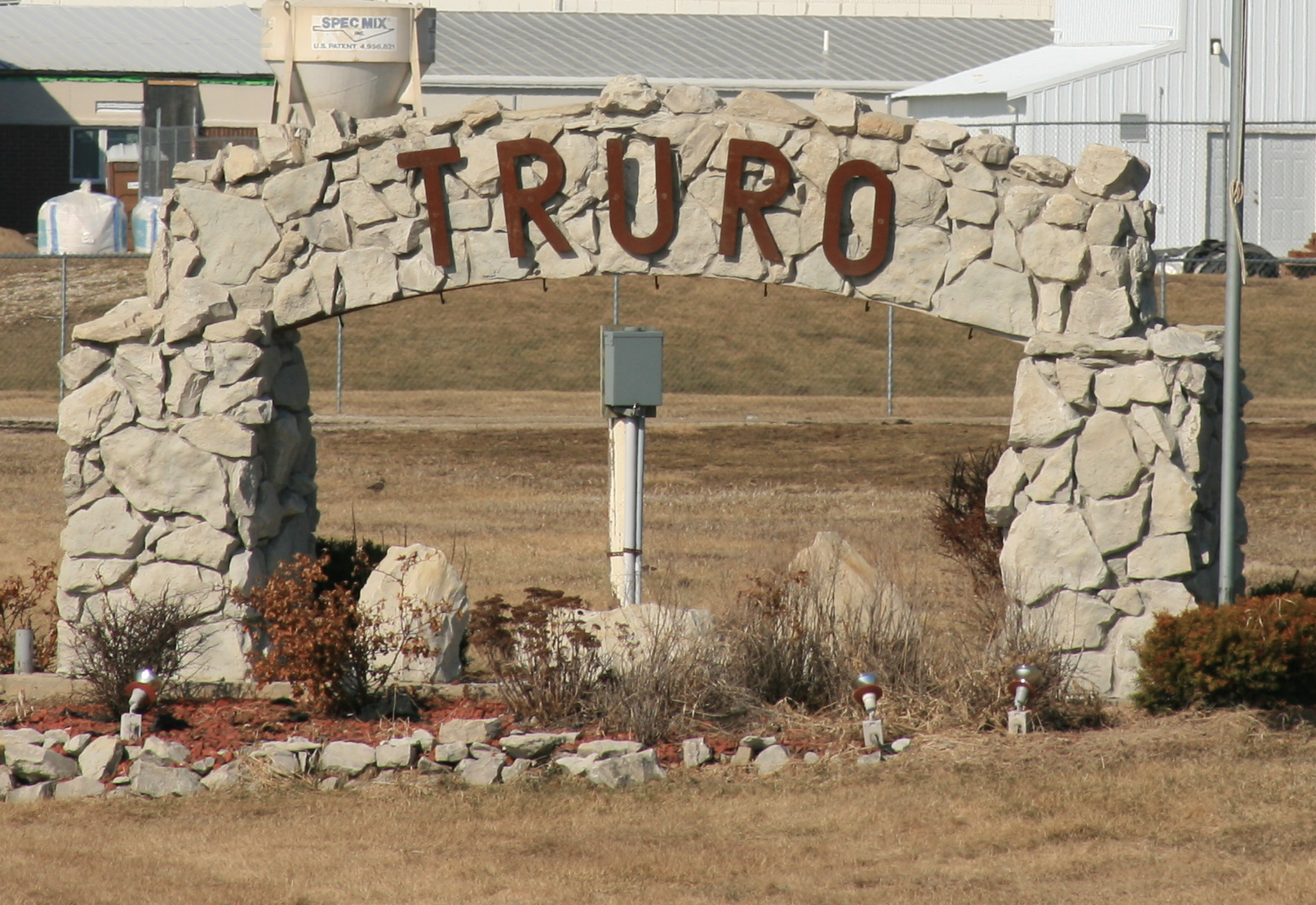
- Sign outside Truro

- Location of Truro, Iowa
- Coordinates: 41°12′35″N 93°50′48″W
- Country: USA
- State: Iowa
- County: Madison
- Incorporated: February 24, 1902

Area
  - Total: 0.98 sq mi (2.55 km^{2})
  - Land: 0.98 sq mi (2.55 km^{2})
  - Water: 0 sq mi (0.00 km^{2})
- Elevation: 1,083 ft (330 m)

Population (2020)
  - Total: 509
  - Density: 516.5/sq mi (199.43/km^{2})
- Time zone: UTC-6 (Central (CST))
  - Summer (DST): UTC-5 (CDT)
- ZIP code: 50257
- Area code: 641
- FIPS code: 19-79140
- GNIS feature ID: 2397067
- Website: truroiowa.org

Truro is a city in southeast Madison County, Iowa, United States. The population was 509 at the time of the 2020 census. Truro is part of the Des Moines–West Des Moines Metropolitan Statistical Area.

== History ==
Truro was laid out and platted in 1881. It was first settled as Ohio Township in the early 1850s, by settlers who came primarily from Ohio. In 1881 the town was named after the city of Truro in Cornwall, United Kingdom, by suggestion of the local train conductor, whose hometown was Truro on Cape Cod in Massachusetts.

== Geography ==
According to the United States Census Bureau, the city has a total area of 0.97 square miles (2.51 km^{2}), all of it land.

== Demographics ==
Historical populations
Year	Pop.	±%
1910	310	—
1920	332	+7.1%
1930	361	+8.7%
1940	353	−2.2%
1950	354	+0.3%
1960	338	−4.5%
1970	359	+6.2%
1980	407	+13.4%
1990	391	−3.9%
2000	427	+9.2%
2010	485	+13.6%
2020	509	+4.9%
Source:"U.S. Census website". United States Census Bureau. and Iowa Data Center; Source: U.S. Decennial Census

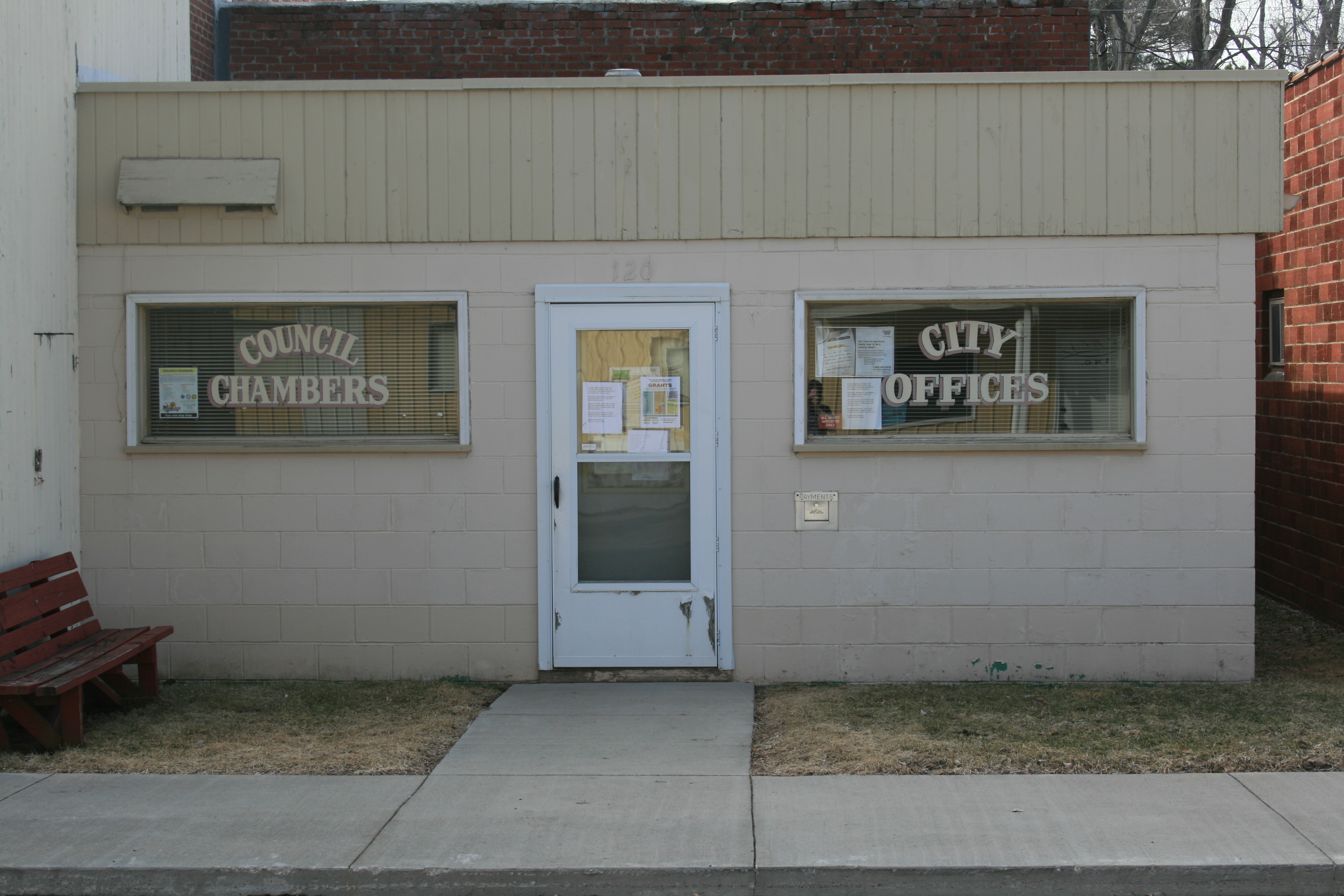
Truro City Hall

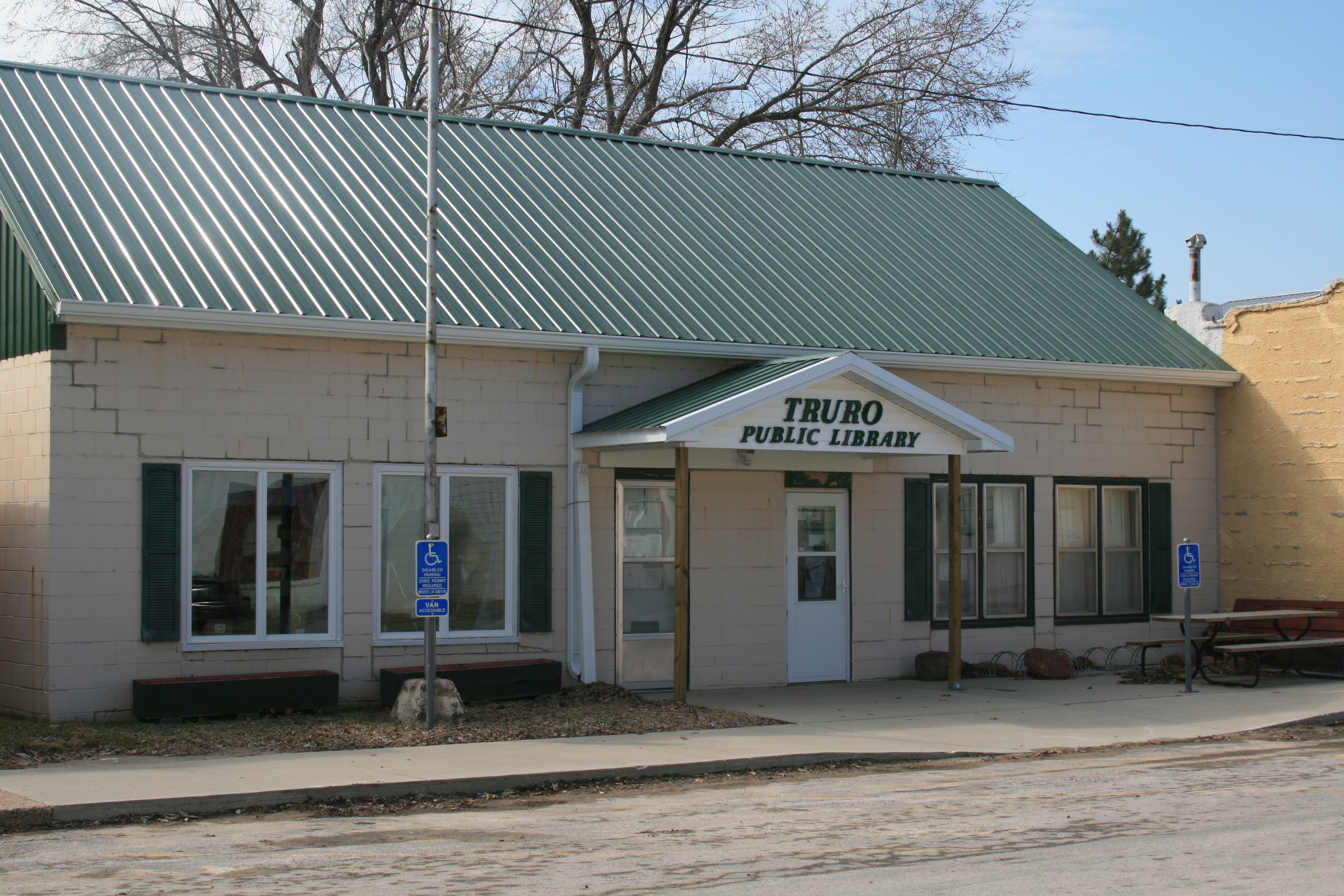
Truro Public Library

=== 2020 census ===
As of the census of 2020, there were 509 people, 177 households, and 131 families residing in the city. The population density was 516.5 inhabitants per square mile (199.4/km^{2}). There were 192 housing units at an average density of 194.8 per square mile (75.2/km^{2}). The racial makeup of the city was 95.3% White, 0.0% Black or African American, 0.0% Native American, 0.8% Asian, 0.0% Pacific Islander, 0.0% from other races and 3.9% from two or more races. Hispanic or Latino persons of any race comprised 1.4% of the population.

Of the 177 households, 42.4% of which had children under the age of 18 living with them, 50.3% were married couples living together, 9.0% were cohabitating couples, 23.7% had a female householder with no spouse or partner present and 16.9% had a male householder with no spouse or partner present. 26.0% of all households were non-families. 20.3% of all households were made up of individuals, 6.8% had someone living alone who was 65 years old or older.

The median age in the city was 30.5 years. 36.3% of the residents were under the age of 20; 4.5% were between the ages of 20 and 24; 25.9% were from 25 and 44; 18.9% were from 45 and 64; and 14.3% were 65 years of age or older. The gender makeup of the city was 48.1% male and 51.9% female.

=== 2010 census ===
As of the census of 2010, there were 485 people, 163 households, and 122 families living in the city. The population density was 500.0 inhabitants per square mile (193.1/km^{2}). There were 187 housing units at an average density of 192.8 per square mile (74.4/km^{2}). The racial makeup of the city was 98.4% White, 0.4% Native American, 0.4% Asian, 0.2% from other races, and 0.6% from two or more races. Hispanic or Latino of any race were 0.2% of the population.

There were 163 households, of which 53.4% had children under the age of 18 living with them, 57.1% were married couples living together, 11.0% had a female householder with no husband present, 6.7% had a male householder with no wife present, and 25.2% were non-families. 23.3% of all households were made up of individuals, and 10.4% had someone living alone who was 65 years of age or older. The average household size was 2.98 and the average family size was 3.47.

The median age in the city was 29.6 years. 38.8% of residents were under the age of 18; 5.3% were between the ages of 18 and 24; 30% were from 25 to 44; 15.6% were from 45 to 64; and 10.1% were 65 years of age or older. The gender makeup of the city was 47.8% male and 52.2% female.

=== 2000 census ===
As of the census of 2000, there were 427 people, 156 households, and 116 families living in the city. The population density was 432.6 inhabitants per square mile (167.0/km^{2}). There were 164 housing units at an average density of 166.1 per square mile (64.1/km^{2}). The racial makeup of the city was 96.96% White, 2.11% Native American, and 0.94% from two or more races. Hispanic or Latino of any race were 1.87% of the population.

There were 156 households, out of which 39.1% had children under the age of 18 living with them, 59.0% were married couples living together, 9.6% had a female householder with no husband present, and 25.6% were non-families. 22.4% of all households were made up of individuals, and 14.1% had someone living alone who was 65 years of age or older. The average household size was 2.74 and the average family size was 3.21.

In the city, the population was spread out, with 34.0% under the age of 18, 6.3% from 18 to 24, 27.4% from 25 to 44, 17.8% from 45 to 64, and 14.5% who were 65 years of age or older. The median age was 33 years. For every 100 females, there were 90.6 males. For every 100 females age 18 and over, there were 88.0 males.

The median income for a household in the city was $33,750, and the median income for a family was $39,500. Males had a median income of $30,833 versus $22,500 for females. The per capita income for the city was $15,021. About 6.3% of families and 10.3% of the population were below the poverty line, including 13.6% of those under age 18 and 14.5% of those age 65 or over.

== Education ==
Interstate 35 Community School District serves the municipality. The Interstate 35 Elementary, Middle & High schools are located in Truro.

== Notable people ==
- Tobin Anderson, Head Coach of the Iona University Men’s Basketball team in New Rochelle, New York
- James William "Ducky" Holmes, Major League Baseball Player, Outfielder, 10 seasons, 7 teams

== In Media ==
The main character of the movie “The Devil Comes To Kansas City” has a farm and home in Truro. The film was partially shot on location in Iowa.
