= Martensdale-St. Marys Community School District =

Public school district in Martensdale, Iowa, United States

Coordinates: 41.375047°N 93.738895°W

Location
- Martensdale, Iowa Warren County and Madison County United States
- Coordinates: 41.375047, -93.738895

District information
- Type: Local school district
- Grades: K-12
- Superintendent: Dr. Bill Watson
- Schools: 2
- Budget: $8,826,000 (2020-21)
- NCES District ID: 1918750

Students and staff
- Students: 580 (2022-23)
- Teachers: 40.63 FTE
- Staff: 48.93 FTE
- Student–teacher ratio: 14.28
- Athletic conference: Pride of Iowa
- District mascot: Blue Devils
- Colors: Royal and Gold

Other information
- Website: mstm.us

Martensdale-St. Marys Community School District is a rural public school district headquartered in Martensdale, Iowa.

The district is split between western Warren County and eastern Madison County. Communities in its service area, in addition to Martensdale, include St. Marys and Bevington.

The district mascot is the Blue Devils, and their colors are royal and gold.

== Schools ==
The district operates two schools, located on a single campus in Martensdale:

- Martensdale-St. Marys Elementary School
- Martensdale-St. Marys Jr/Sr High School

=== Martensdale-St. Marys High School ===
==== Athletics ====
The Blue Devils compete in the Pride of Iowa Conference in the following sports:

- Girls Wrestling
- Volleyball
- Cross Country
- Basketball
  - Girls' 2011 Class 1A State Champions
- Wrestling
- Golf
- Soccer
- Track and Field
- Baseball
  - 5-time State Champions (1941, 2004, 2010, 2011, 2012)
- Softball
  - 2012 Class 1A State Champions

== See also ==
- List of school districts in Iowa
- List of high schools in Iowa
