= James Redfield (Iowa soldier) =

American politician and military figure

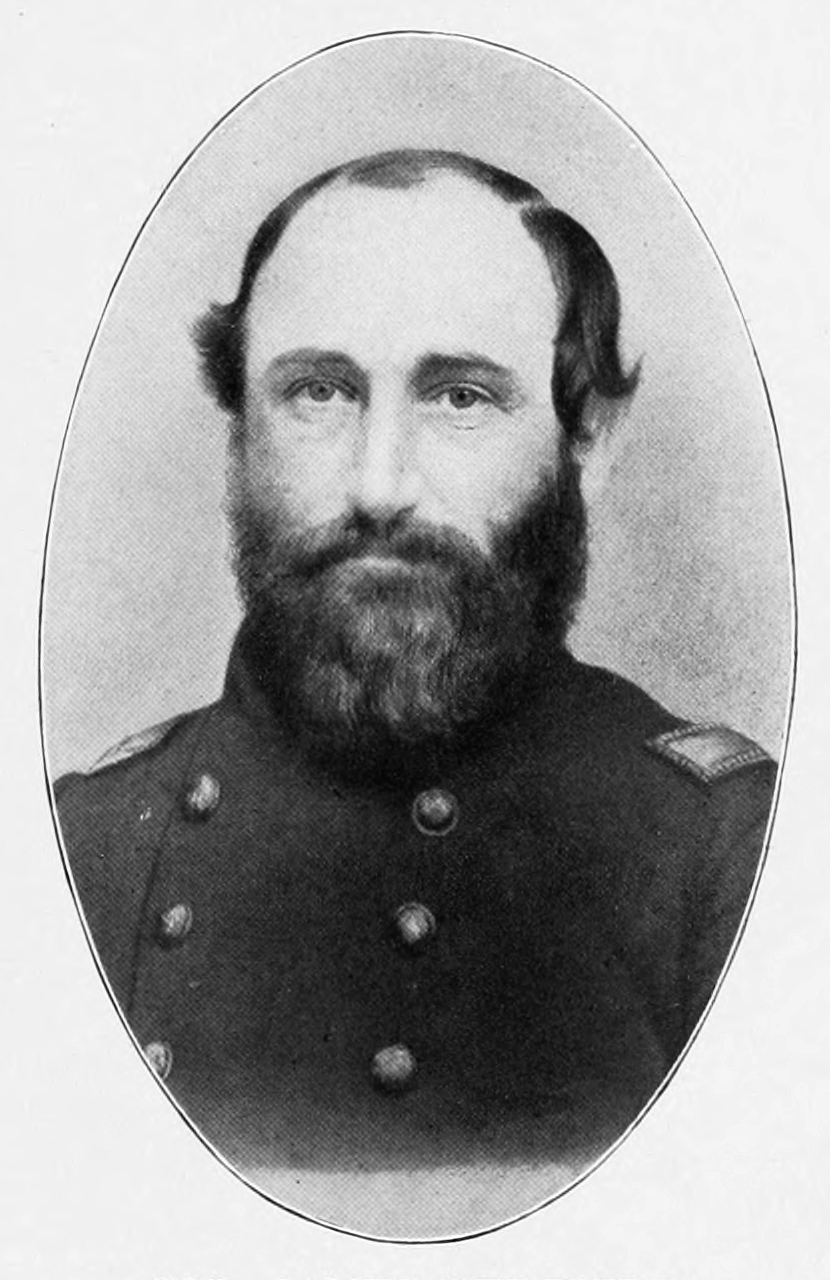
Col. James Redfield

James Redfield (March 27, 1824 – October 6, 1864) was an American politician and Civil War officer. He died at the Battle of Allatoona.

He was son of Luther Redfield and was born in Clyde, New York, March 27, 1824. He graduated from Yale College in 1845. After leaving college he studied law in his native place, was elected County School Commissioner, and finally accepted a position at Albany, New York in the office of Hon. Christopher Morgan, Secretary of State of New York.

In 1855, he moved to Iowa, and established himself near the geographical centre of the State. The town of Redfield, Iowa received its name from him. He held several offices of trust in Dallas County, Iowa, and in 1860 was elected to the Iowa State Senate.

On the outbreak of the Civil War he raised a company of which he was elected captain, and on the organization of a regiment, the 39th Iowa Volunteer Infantry Regiment, he was elected its lieutenant colonel. He continued in that post until his death. His regiment was in active service at the West, under Buel, Ulysses S. Grant, and William Tecumseh Sherman. When Allatoona Pass was attacked by French's Division of Hood's army, Col. Redfield, then garrisoning the town of Rome, Georgia, went forward with his command to defend the pass. While cheering on his men to resist the rebel attack, a ball pierced his heart and he fell dead. His remains were buried in a village near the battle-field. He left a widow and three children.

This article incorporates public domain material from the Yale Obituary Record.
