= Raccoon River Conference =

Iowa High School athletic conference

- Conference: IHSAA / IGHSAU
- Founded: 1941?
- Sports fielded: 18
- No. of teams: 8
- Region: Central Iowa
- Website: www.raccoonriverconference.org

The Raccoon River Conference is an eight team high school athletic league in central Iowa. Made up of mid-sized school districts located mostly west of Des Moines, all schools in the conference are currently 3A schools, the second largest class of schools in Iowa.

== Current members ==
Institution	Location	Mascot	Colors	Affiliation	2026-2027 BEDS	Joined
ADM	Adel	Tigers		Public	500	1956–57
Ballard	Huxley	Bombers		Public	455	1988–89
Bondurant–Farrar	Bondurant	Bluejays		Public	636	2011–12
Boone	Boone	Toreadors		Public	510	2009–10
Carlisle	Carlisle	Wildcats		Public	546	1996–97
Gilbert	Gilbert	Tigers		Public	406	2020–21
North Polk	Alleman	Comets		Public	472	2020–21
Winterset	Winterset	Huskies		Public	369	1998–99

=== Future members ===
Institution	Location	Mascot	Colors	Affiliation	2026-2027 BEDS	Joining	Departing Conference
Pella	Pella	Little Dutch		Public	579	2027-28	Little Hawkeye Conference
Van Meter	Van Meter	Bulldogs		Public	244	2027-28	West Central Activities Conference

== Former members ==
• * Indicates that school is no longer operating

Institution	Location	Mascot	Colors	Left for
Dallas Center *	Dallas Center	Mustangs		Consolidated with Grimes to form Dallas Center-Grimes
Dallas Center-Grimes	Grimes	Mustangs		Little Hawkeye Conference
Dexfield*	Redfield	Blue Devils		consolidated with Stuart-Menlo to form West Central Valley
Earlham	Earlham	Cardinals		Little Eight Conference
Interstate 35	Truro	Roadrunners		Pride of Iowa Conference
Greene County	Jefferson	Rams		Heart of Iowa Conference
Madrid	Madrid	Tigers		Central Valley Conference
Nevada	Nevada	Cubs		Heart of Iowa Conference
Norwalk	Norwalk	Warriors		Little Hawkeye Conference
North Polk County	Alleman	Comets		Heart of Iowa Conference
Ogden	Ogden	Bulldogs		Heart of Iowa Conference
Panora*	Panora	Bluejays		conoslidates with Linden to form Panora-Linden
Panora-Linden*	Panora	Hawks		Little Eight Conference
Perry	Perry	Bluejays		Heart of Iowa Conference
PCM	Monroe	Mustangs		South Central Conference
Redfield*	Redfield	Bulldogs		consolidated with Dexter to form Dexfield
Stuart*	Stuart	Dragons		Little Eight Conference
Saydel	Des Moines	Eagles		Heart of Iowa Conference
Waukee	Waukee	Warriors		Central Iowa Metro League
West Central Valley	Stuart	Wildcats		West Central Activities Conference
Woodward*	Woodward	Hawks		consolidated with Granger to form Woodward-Granger
Woodward-Granger	Woodward	Hawks		Heart of Iowa Conference
Carroll	Carroll	Tigers		Hawkeye 10 Conference

== History ==
The Raccoon River Conference was originally a small school conference. The conference's founding members were Bondurant–Farrar, Norwalk, Madrid, Woodward-Granger, Interstate 35, Waukee, Dallas Center-Grimes, and Adel–De Soto. When schools on the outer regions of the Des Moines metro began to experience significant growth, Bondurant–Farrar and Ogden decided to leave for the smaller Heart of Iowa Conference, and I-35 joined the Pride of Iowa Conference. Woodward-Granger soon followed, moving to the HOI conference. This flurry of change saw the league reform itself. By 1998, there were 14 members in the conference, competing in two divisions. The league then consisted of A-D-M, Ballard, Carlisle, Carroll, Dallas Center-Grimes, Jefferson–Scranton, Nevada, North Polk, Perry, Prairie City-Monroe, Saydel, Waukee, West Central Valley, and Winterset. Over the next two years, North Polk, Prairie City-Monroe, Waukee, and W.C. Valley all joined different conferences, leaving the league with ten teams. In 2007, Jefferson–Scranton left for the Heart of Iowa Conference. Nevada followed them there in 2009, the same year Boone joined the league.

Bondurant–Farrar rejoined the Raccoon River Conference in the 2011–12 school year. Dallas Center-Grimes, one of the league's founding members, left for the Little Hawkeye Conference in 2013.

Gilbert and North Polk both joined for the 2020–21 school year. They left their former conference, the Heart of Iowa Conference.

On September 15, 2025, the Carroll Community School Board unanimously voted to accept an invitation to join the Hawkeye 10 conference effective the 2026-2027 school year.

On December 16, 2025, the Pella School Board unanimously voted to join the Raccoon River Conference, replacing the departing Carroll Tigers. They will join for the 2027-2028 school year, after departing the Little Hawkeye Conference. Pella has an enrollment of 609 BEDS for the 2025-2026 school year.

On December 19, 2025, the Van Meter school board officially approved a move to the Raccoon River Conference for the 2027-2028 school year.
