= Newton High School =

Newton High School may refer to:

- Newton High School (Georgia) — Covington, Georgia
- Newton High School (Illinois) — Newton, Illinois
- Newton High School (Iowa) — Newton, Iowa
- Newton High School (Kansas) — Newton, Kansas
- Newton High School (Mississippi) — Newton, Mississippi
- Newton High School (New Jersey) — Newton, New Jersey
- Newton High School (Ohio) — Pleasant Hill, Ohio
- Newton High School (Texas) — Newton, Texas
- Newton Christian High School — Newton, Kansas
- Newton-Conover High School — Newton, North Carolina
- Newton Falls High School — Newton Falls, Ohio
- Newton North High School — Newton, Massachusetts (known as Newton High School prior to 1974)
- Newton South High School — Newton, Massachusetts (established 1960)
- East Newton High School — Granby, Missouri
- North Newton Junior-Senior High School — Morocco, Indiana
- South Newton High School — Kentland, Indiana

== See also ==
- Newtown High School (disambiguation)
