= Gilbert School District =

Gilbert School District or Gilbert Schools may refer to:

- Gilbert Public School District - Arizona
- Gilbert Community School District - Iowa
