= Carlisle Community School District =

Public school district in Carlisle, Iowa, United States

Coordinates: 41.662855°N 92.018800°W

Location
- Carlisle, Iowa Iowa County United States
- Coordinates: 41.662855, -92.018800

District information
- Type: Local school district
- Grades: K-12
- Superintendent: Erik Anderson
- Schools: 4
- Budget: $29,437,000 (2020-21)
- NCES District ID: 1906270

Students and staff
- Students: 2,369 (2022-23)
- Teachers: 141.64 FTE
- Staff: 109.04 FTE
- Student–teacher ratio: 16.73
- Athletic conference: Raccoon River
- District mascot: Wildcats
- Colors: Red and Gold

Other information
- Website: www.carlislecsd.org

Carlisle Community School District, also known as the Carlisle Community Schools, is a rural public school district headquartered in Carlisle, Iowa, United States, in Greater Des Moines. The district is located southeast of Downtown Des Moines. It includes the cities of Carlisle, Avon Lake, and Hartford, and it also serves a southeastern portion of the City of Des Moines. The district includes territory in Polk County and Warren County.

== History ==
Around 1979, enrollment in the district was increasing. That year, the Hartford Attendance Center had two fewer classrooms than needed, while the Des Moines Schools were having to close unused schools.

In 2007, the district voted to suspend open enrollment partly in order to ensure that class sizes remained small.

In 2008, the board of directors of the district recommended the establishment of a school foundation. The Empowering Carlisle Community Schools foundation was established.

== Schools ==
Three schools, Carlisle High School (9-12), Carlisle Middle School (6-8), and Carlisle Elementary School (PreK-3) are within the city limits. The high school, the lower elementary school, and the district headquarters are adjacent to one another. Hartford Upper Elementary School (4-5) is not within the City of Carlisle. It is located in Hartford.

== Carlisle High School ==
=== Athletics ===
The Wildcats compete in the Raccoon River Conference in the following sports:

==== Fall Sports ====
- Tennis (girls) With Lincoln
- Cross Country (boys and girls)
- Swimming (girls) With Lincoln
- Volleyball (girls)
- Football

==== Winter Sports ====
- Bowling (boys and girls) With Lincoln
- Basketball (boys and girls)
  - Girls 2026 4A State Champions
- Wrestling
- Swimming (boys) With Lincoln

==== Spring Sports ====
- Track and Field (boys and girls)
- Golf (boys and girls)
- Soccer (boys and girls)
- Baseball
  - 2003 Class 2A State Champions
- Softball
  - 6-time State Champions (1994, 1996, 1997, 2010, 2019, 2024)

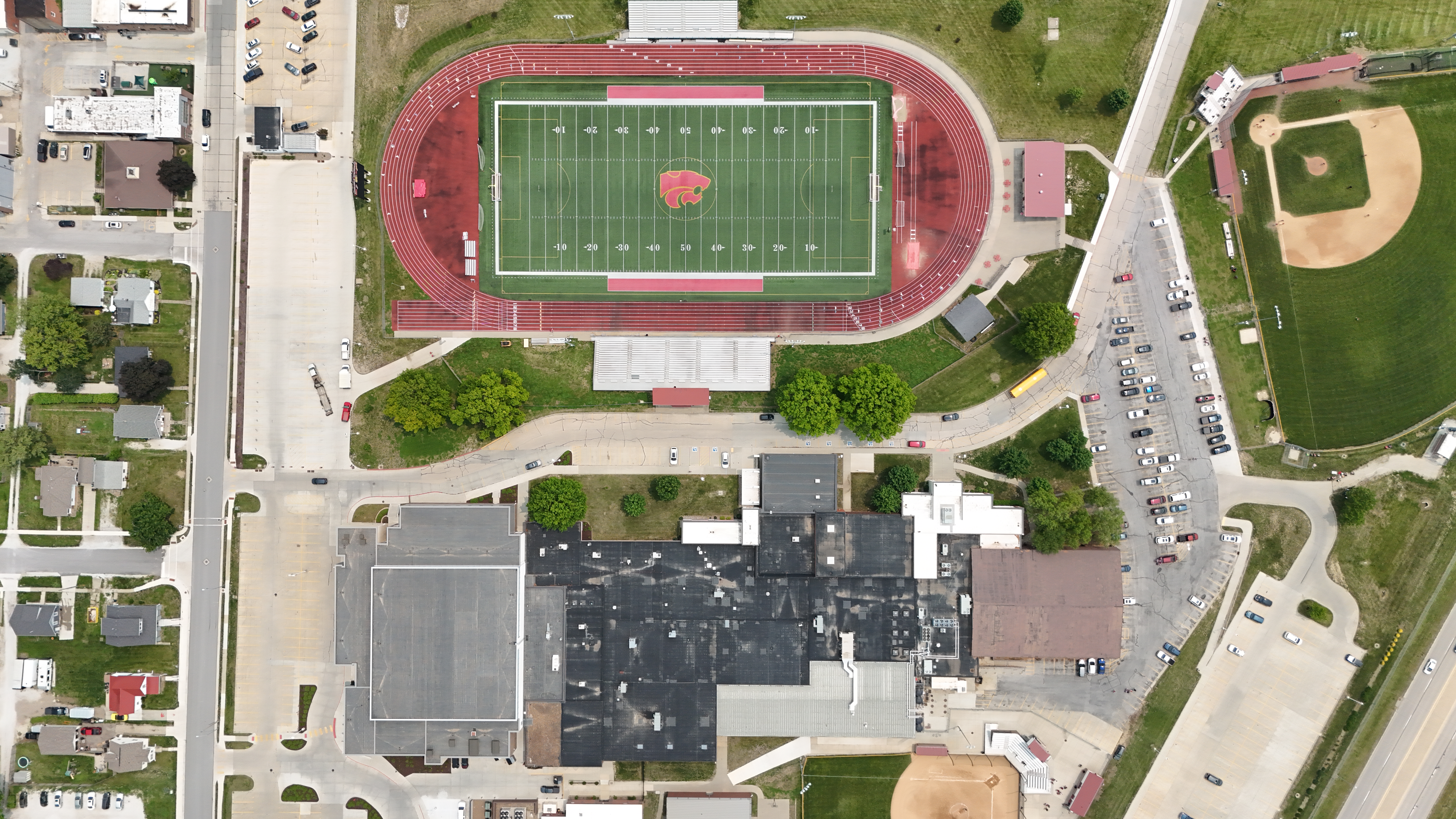
Carlisle high school (lower center) and athletic fields

== See also ==
- List of school districts in Iowa
- List of high schools in Iowa
