= Gilbert Junior-Senior High School =

Public secondary school in Gilbert, Iowa, United States

Gilbert High School
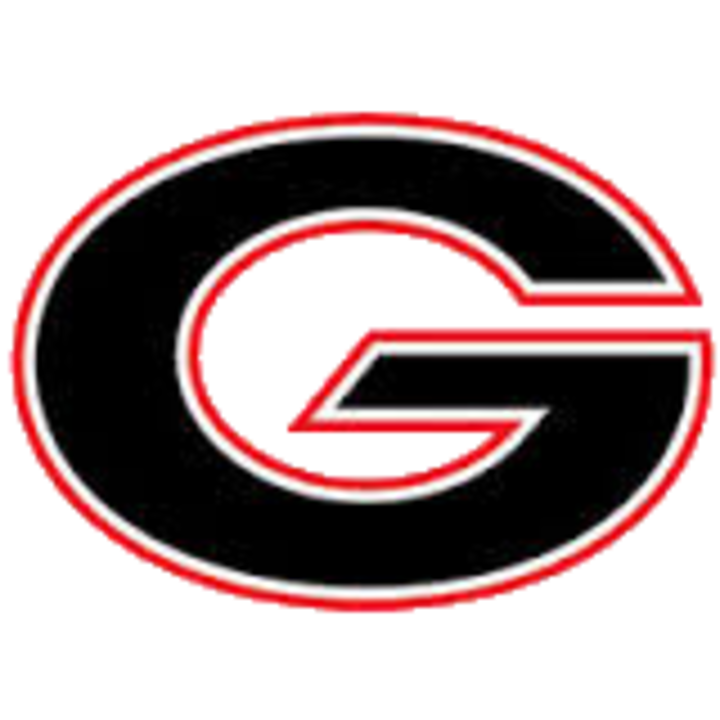

Location
- 312 Gretten Street; Gilbert, Iowa 50105; United States
- 42.107°N 93.641°W

Information
- Type: Public high school
- School district: Gilbert Community School District
- Superintendent: Dr. Christine Trujillo =
- NCES School ID: 191251000760
- Principal: Cindy Bassett
- Teaching staff: 34.00 (on an FTE basis)
- Grades: 9-12
- Enrollment: 528 (2023-2024)
- Student to teacher ratio: 15.53
- Colors: Red and black
- Fight song: On Wisconsin
- Athletics conference: Raccoon River Conference
- Nickname: Tigers
- Website: highschool.gilbertcsd.org

Gilbert High School is a public high school in Gilbert, Iowa, United States. A part of the Gilbert Community School District, it serves Gilbert and northern Ames.

== Infrastructure ==
The current high school was opened in 2012. In the high school there is a gymnasium and modern weight lifting facility. Outside there is a softball and baseball diamond, along with a new AstroTurf football field. The school boasts a strong agricultural and mechanics education program.

== Athletics ==
Gilbert's mascot is the Tiger. Gilbert High School is a member of the Raccoon River Conference. Teams sponsored by the school in fall include football, cross-country, and volleyball. During winter, the school sponsors basketball, wrestling, and bowling. There are also hockey, tennis and swim teams in Ames that some Gilbert students compete on, but they are not school-affiliated, rather the swim and tennis are Ames High School teams, and the hockey team is not affiliated with any public school. The spring sports lineup consists of golf, track, and soccer. Lastly, the school features baseball and softball in the summer.

Gilbert's biggest rivals are the nearby Boone Toreadors, Roland-Story Norsemen, Nevada Cubs and Ballard Bombers.

=== Successes ===
Boys cross country -Class 3A State Champions in 2014, 2017, 2018 and 2023.

Girls cross country-Class 2A State Champions in 2013

Boys golf-Class 2A State Champions in 2021 and 2022.

Boys soccer-2A State Champions in 2023, 2025 and 2026.

== Notable alumni ==
- Jerry McNertney — former Major League Baseball player

== See also ==
- List of high schools in Iowa
