= Little Hawkeye Conference =

High school athletic conference in Iowa, US

- Conference: IHSAA / IGHSAU
- Founded: 1982
- Sports fielded: 21; men's: 11; women's: 10
- No. of teams: 9
- Region: Central Iowa
- Website: www.littlehawkeyeconference.com

The Little Hawkeye Conference is a high school athletic conference in central Iowa.

The conference consists of nine schools, with four of them in Class 3A (Des Moines Christian, Newton, Oskaloosa and Pella) and four others in Class 4A (Ames, Dallas Center-Grimes, Indianola and Norwalk), with the ninth member, Pella Christian, being a Class 2A school.

== Members ==
Institution	Location	Mascot	Colors	Affiliation	2026-2027 BEDS
Ames	Ames	Little Cyclones		Public	1,076
Des Moines Christian School	Urbandale	Lions		Private	358
Dallas Center–Grimes	Grimes	Mustangs		Public	873
Indianola	Indianola	Indians		Public	844
Newton	Newton	Cardinals		Public	636
Norwalk	Norwalk	Warriors		Public	809
Oskaloosa	Oskaloosa	Indians		Public	465
Pella	Pella	Little Dutch		Public	579
Pella Christian	Pella	Eagles		Private	240

== History ==
The conference was formed in 1983 by Norwalk, Clarke, Winterset and Saydel.

In 1988, the conference doubles, adding Perry, Carlisle, Johnston and Nevada.

In 1991, Perry and Saydel departed for the Raccoon River Conference, and Boone and Pella Christian join the conference.

Carlisle and Nevada left the conference after the 1995–96 school year for the Raccoon River Conference. Clarke (Osceola) left the same year to join the reformed South Central Conference. Grinnell, Knoxville and Pella were added from the South Central Conference after it folded after the 1995–96 school year. (The Conference reformed with smaller schools the same year.) Oskaloosa also applied for membership but was denied so they joined the Southeast Seven (now Southeast Iowa Conference).

After the 1997–98 school year, Johnston left for the Central Iowa Metropolitan League, and Winterset left for the Raccoon River Conference. Oskaloosa was added from the Southeast Seven Conference for the 1998–99 school year. At around 2000, the Little Hawkeye Conference was an eight team league consisting of Boone, Grinnell, Knoxville, Norwalk, Oskaloosa, Pella, Pella Christian, and Waukee.

For the 2006–07 school year, Waukee, who had recently moved up to 4A status and was one of Iowa's fastest growing school districts, left the league for the Central Iowa Metro League. They were replaced by Newton, whose recently resignation from the CIML had coincidentally opened the door for Waukee to join the conference. South Tama, formerly of the WaMaC Conference also joined the league that year, and the conference played with nine schools until Boone left in 2009 to join the Raccoon River Conference, a much better geographical and competitive fit for the school. South Tama left the conference for the North Iowa Cedar League in 2011.

Indianola High School explored the option of leaving the Central Iowa Metro League to join the league, however, in June 2010, the Indianola School Board voted unanimously to stay in the CIML. Indianola is still a 4A school, but is seeing its enrollment figures drop and is now the smallest school in the CIML. In late 2012, Dallas Center–Grimes was admitted into the league as its eighth member for the 2013–14 school year. However, membership reverted to seven for the 2014–15 school year, as Knoxville moved to the South Central Conference. Indianola then joined the Conference from the CIML for the 2016–17 school year. Grinnell left for the WaMac Conference in 2023.

Although primarily a Class 3A league – that is, in sports where the state's high school athletic associations use four classes of enrollment for its post-season competitions, with Class 4A being the largest - for much of its existence, the addition of Indianola (whose enrollment solidly placed it as a Class 4A school) and the recent growth of Norwalk and Dallas Center-Grimes have changed the dynamic. Norwalk was classed 4A for the first time in 2020, while Dallas Center-Grimes followed suit in 2022; Newton has fluctuated between Class 3A and 4A at times since joining the Little Hawkeye.

On April 21, 2025, Ames Community School District school board voted to leave the Iowa Alliance Conference and join the Little Hawkeye. They will be the 8th member starting in the 2026–2027 school year.

On June 6, 2025, Des Moines Christian School announced that they had officially accepted an invitation to join the Little Hawkeye Conference as their 9th member for the 2026–2027 school year. Des Moines Christian currently competes in the West Central Activities Conference.

On December 16, 2025, Pella Community School District school board voted unanimously to leave the Little Hawkeye Conference to join the Raccoon River Conference for the 2027–2028 school year. They will essentially be replacing Carroll Community School District as they depart the Raccoon River Conference for the Hawkeye 10 Conference.

It was announced on April 27, 2026 that Oskaloosa Community School District would be leaving the Little Hawkeye Conference for the Southeast Conference for the 2028-2029 school year.
