= Bondurant–Farrar Community School District =

Public school district in Bondurant, Iowa, United States

Coordinates: 41.698096°N 93.465010°W

Location
- Bondurant, Iowa Polk County and Jasper County United States
- Coordinates: 41.698096, -93.465010

District information
- Type: Local school district
- Grades: K–12
- Superintendent: Dr. Rich Powers
- Schools: 5
- Budget: $34,699,000 (2020–21)
- NCES District ID: 1905070

Students and staff
- Students: 2731 (2022–23)
- Teachers: 182.64 FTE
- Staff: 188.17 FTE
- Student–teacher ratio: 14.95
- Athletic conference: Raccoon River
- District mascot: Bluejays
- Colors: Blue and White

Other information
- Website: www.bfschools.org

The Bondurant–Farrar Community School District is a rural public school district headquartered in Bondurant, Iowa.

The district is mostly in eastern Polk County, with a small area in Jasper County. The district serves Bondurant, the unincorporated community of Farrar, and the surrounding rural areas. This district also operates their schools like Bondurant-Farrar High School, Bondurant-Farrar Junior High School, and Bondurant-Farrar Intermediate School.

Dr. Rich Powers has been superintendent since 2014. Dr. Powers was selected for the 2020 Superintendent Outstanding Administrator Award by the Iowa Bandmasters Association (IBA).

== Schools ==
- Bondurant–Farrar High School
- Bondurant–Farrar Junior High School
- Bondurant–Farrar Intermediate School
- Anderson Elementary School
- Morris Elementary School

=== Bondurant–Farrar High School ===
==== Athletics ====
The Bluejays compete in the Raccoon River Conference in the following sports:

===== Fall sports =====
- Cross country (boys and girls)
- Swimming (girls)
- Volleyball (girls)
- Football

===== Winter sports =====
- Basketball (boys and girls)
  - Boys – 1997 Class 2A State Champions
  - Boys – 2023 Class 3A State Champions
- Wrestling
  - 1997 Class 1A State Duals Champions
- Swimming (boys)

===== Spring sports =====
- Track and field (boys and girls)
- Golf (boys and girls)
  - Girls – 2009 Class 3A State Champions
- Tennis (boys and girls)
- Soccer (girls)
- Baseball
- Softball
  - 2013 Class 3A State Champions
