= Indianola Community School District (Iowa) =

Public school district in Indianola, Iowa, United States

Location
- Indianola, Iowa Warren County United States
- Coordinates: 41.35563°N 93.54166°W

District information
- Type: Local school district
- Grades: K-12
- Superintendent: Ted Ihns
- Asst. superintendent(s): Ron Lorenz
- Schools: 6
- Budget: $54,764,000 (2020-21)
- NCES District ID: 1914640

Students and staff
- Students: 3,665 (2022-23)
- Teachers: 234.24 FTE
- Staff: 219.33 FTE
- Student–teacher ratio: 15.65
- Athletic conference: Little Hawkeye
- District mascot: Indians
- Colors: Purple and Gold

Other information
- Website: www.indianola.k12.ia.us

Indianola Community School District is a public school district headquartered in Indianola, Iowa. The district is completely within Warren County, and serves the city of Indianola and surrounding areas including the towns of Ackworth and Sandyville.

Indianola Community School District is bordered by the school districts of Carlisle, Clarke, Des Moines Independent, Interstate 35, Martensdale-St. Mary's, Norwalk, Pleasantville, and Southeast Warren.

== Schools ==
The district operates six schools, all in Indianola:

- Emerson Elementary School
- Irving Elementary School
- Whittier Elementary School
- Wilder Elementary School
- Indianola Middle School
- Indianola High School

Closed Schools

- Indianola Junior High School
- Hawthorne Elementary School

== Indianola High School ==
=== Athletics ===
The Indians compete in the Little Hawkeye Conference in the following sports:

- Baseball
  - 2026 Class 4A State Champions
- Basketball (boys and girls)
  - Boys' 2001 Class 4A State Champions
- Bowling
- Cross Country (boys and girls)
  - Boys' three-time State Champions (1971, 1972, 2025)
- Football
- Golf (boys and girls)
- Soccer (boys and girls)
- Softball
  - 2012 Class 4A State Champions
- Swimming (boys and girls)
- Tennis (boys and girls)
- Track and Field (boys and girls)
  - Boys' - 1958 State Champions
  - Girls' - 5-time Class 3A State Champions (1978, 1979, 1980, 1993, 1994)
- Volleyball
- Wrestling
  - 1994 Class 3A State Champions

== See also ==
- List of school districts in Iowa
- List of high schools in Iowa
