= Nile Kinnick =

American football player (1918–1943)

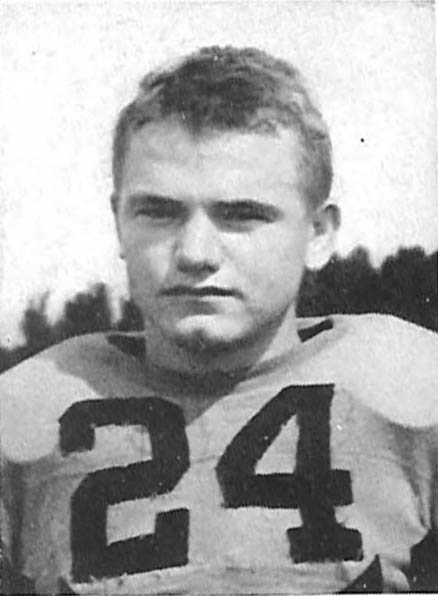
- Kinnick c. 1939

No. 24
- Position: Halfback

Personal information
- Born: July 9, 1918; Adel, Iowa, U.S.
- Died: June 2, 1943 (aged 24); Gulf of Paria, Venezuela
- Listed height: 5 ft 8 in (1.73 m)
- Listed weight: 167 lb (76 kg)

Career information
- High school: Adel (Adel, Iowa); Benson (Omaha, Nebraska)
- College: Iowa (1937–1939)

Awards and highlights
- Heisman Trophy (1939); Maxwell Award (1939); Walter Camp Memorial Trophy (1939); AP Male Athlete of the Year (1939); Consensus All-American (1939); Third-team All-American (1937); Chicago Tribune Silver Football (1939); 2× First-team All-Big Ten (1937, 1939); Iowa Hawkeyes No. 24 retired
- College Football Hall of Fame (Class of 1951)

Other information
- Military career
- Burial place: Tablets of the Missing, East Coast Memorial; The Battery, New York, U.S.
- Allegiance: United States
- Branch: United States Navy
- Service years: 1941–1943
- Rank: Ensign
- Unit: USS Lexington
- Conflicts: World War II
- Memorials: Nile C. Kinnick High School; Kinnick Stadium; Kinnick–Feller Park (Note: As a youth, Kinnick played football in this park at Adel, Iowa. The park is also named for Bob Feller, a Major League Baseball Hall of Fame pitcher, World War II and Korean War veteran. Both were teammates on a Junior Legion baseball team.)

Nile Clarke Kinnick Jr. (July 9, 1918 – June 2, 1943) was an American naval aviator, law student, and college football player for the Iowa Hawkeyes. He won the 1939 Heisman Trophy and was a consensus All-American. He died during a training flight while serving as a United States Navy aviator in World War II. Kinnick was inducted into the College Football Hall of Fame in 1951, and the University of Iowa renamed its football stadium Kinnick Stadium in his honor in 1972.

== Early life ==
Nile Clarke Kinnick Jr. was the son of Nile Clarke Kinnick Sr. and Frances Clarke. He had two younger brothers, Ben and George. His maternal grandfather, George W. Clarke, graduated from the University of Iowa in 1878 and served two two-year terms as the Governor of Iowa from 1913 to 1917.

Nile's parents were devoted to the teachings of Christian Science and helped Nile develop values of discipline, hard work, and strong morals. Nile was reportedly constantly thinking about self-improvement and working on turning personal weaknesses into strengths. Nile was also a devout Christian Scientist, and regularly attended the Christian Science branch church in Iowa City, while he was a student at the university.

Kinnick began showing athletic aptitude at a young age as well. As a youth, he played on a Junior Legion baseball team with the future major leaguer Bob Feller.

At Adel High School, Kinnick led the football team to an undefeated season, and then he scored 485 points for the basketball team, leading them to the district finals. After his junior year of high school, the Kinnick family moved when Nile Kinnick Sr. took a job in Omaha, Nebraska. Nile was a first-team all-state selection in both football and basketball as a senior, as he started for one year with his brother Ben at Benson High School in Omaha. He led Benson to a third-place finish in the state basketball and to the city baseball championship.

== Career ==
=== Undergraduate years ===
Kinnick had always been an excellent student as well as an athletic leader, and he could have graduated in 1935, but his parents held him back a year to become thoroughly prepared for the university. He considered the University of Minnesota – how seriously is not clear – but he chose the University of Iowa. The struggles of the Iowa Hawkeyes football team might have attracted him. Verle Davis, Kinnick's football coach at Adel, recalled that "Kinnick was determined to go to some school that was down ... He didn't want to go to Minnesota, because they were on top ... He finally went to Iowa as he figured they were at their lowest ebb." The account is persuasive, because it was typical of Kinnick. To start from nothing and test himself against his own weakness as well as outside resistance were challenges Kinnick always pursued if they were available.

He was recruited to Iowa by Coach Ossie Solem in 1936. Kinnick was named the co-captain of the freshman team. He also played baseball and basketball during his freshman year.

After the 1936 season, Solem left Iowa to go to Syracuse University, and the University of Iowa hired Irl Tubbs to replace him. As a sophomore, Kinnick was terrific, but the Hawkeyes just could not win. Iowa battled Washington, the eventual Pacific Coast Conference champions, to the wire in a 14–0 defeat and then scored an early victory over Bradley University. It was Iowa's only win of the year. But opponents raved about Kinnick. After scoring Iowa's only touchdown in a 13–6 loss to Wisconsin, Solem wrote the Des Moines Register sportswriter Sec Taylor from Syracuse, "I was sure that Kinnick was destined to be the greatest back in all Iowa history, and I am more convinced than ever that he will be."

Iowa lost all five Big Ten Conference games in 1937. The "heartbreaking" loss was a 7–6 defeat at the hands of Michigan, despite Kinnick's 74-yard punt return for a touchdown. Sportswriter Bert McGrane wrote, "I can't recall a single break that favored Iowa ... You'd think Iowa would win the toss by accident once in a while." Iowa had not won the coin toss in 13 games. Kinnick, the lone bright spot of the 1937 season, led the nation in punting and was named first team All-Big Ten and a third team All-American.

Kinnick played basketball, too, and he was Iowa's second leading scorer and the 15th leading scorer in the Big Ten his sophomore year in 1937–38. After a brief stint in baseball that summer, Nile dropped the third sport. In 1938, he hurt his ankle in preseason football practice and was not at full strength for his entire junior year. Kinnick played through the pain, but it hampered his effectiveness. His Christian Science beliefs limited the amount of medical assistance that Kinnick allowed himself to receive from the team doctors, believing that his injury could be overcome by his reliance on prayer for healing.

Kinnick was an honorable mention All-Big Ten selection his junior year in 1938. (It was later revealed that he had probably played the 1938 season with a broken ankle. Most contemporaries say that because of Christian Science religion he would not allow himself to be examined by a doctor. In fact, the Christian Science religion does not prohibit medical help, and leaves the choice whether to seek medical attention up to the individual. However, a teammate says that he did not go to a doctor because he had learned a different style of wrapping his ankle and did not want anyone else messing with it. He "went to a doctor when something was wrong with him.") He also declared that he would not participate in basketball in the upcoming year, citing personal concerns over his school work. After a 1–6–1 season, Irl Tubbs was fired at Iowa, and the doctor, Eddie Anderson, was now the head coach.

Kinnick was also a member of the Phi Kappa Psi fraternity at the University of Iowa during his undergraduate years.

=== 1939 season ===
Hawkeye halfback Nile Kinnick breaks through the line during the September 30, 1939, game against South Dakota.

Before the 1939 season, Kinnick wrote, "For three years, nay for fifteen years, I have been preparing for this last year of football. I anticipate becoming the roughest, toughest all-around back yet to hit this conference." He also wrote, "I'm looking forward to showing Anderson what a real football player looks like – so hold your hats."

Coach Anderson liked Kinnick immediately. He referred to all of his players by their last names, except Kinnick, who was always "Nile". Anderson favored student-athletes, because he felt that scholars made better players over the long run. He believed the 1939 team could be a good one, but only if the starters played significant minutes. Before the first game, the Des Moines Register had a small note stating that "a set of iron men may be developed to play football for Iowa." The 1939 Hawkeyes, nicknamed the "Ironmen", would become one of the greatest teams in school history. Many of Anderson's players played complete games during that season for the Hawkeyes.

In 1939, Iowa finished the year ranked ninth in the AP Poll with a 6–1–1 record. Kinnick threw for 638 yards and 11 touchdowns on only 31 passes and ran for 374 yards. He was involved in 16 of the 19 touchdowns (11 passing, 5 rushing) that Iowa scored and was involved in 107 of the 130 points that Iowa scored that year. He played 402 of a possible 420 minutes that season. All told, Kinnick set 14 school records, six of which still stand over 65 years later.

At the end of the season, Nile Kinnick won virtually every major award in the country. He was a consensus First-Team All-American, and he appeared on every first team ballot to become the only unanimous selection in the AP voting. He won the Big Ten MVP award by the largest margin in history. He also won the Maxwell Award and the Walter Camp Memorial Trophy. Nile Kinnick even won the Associated Press Male Athlete of the Year, beating out such notables as Joe DiMaggio, Byron Nelson, and Joe Louis. He was the first college football player to win that award. On November 28, 1939, Nile Kinnick won the Heisman Trophy, becoming to date the only Iowa Hawkeye to win college football's most prestigious award.

=== Heisman Trophy ===
Upon receiving the Heisman at the Downtown Athletic Club in New York City, Kinnick made the following statement during his acceptance speech:

Finally, please if you'll permit me, I'd like to make a comment which in my mind, is indicative perhaps of the greater significance of football, and sports emphasis in general in this country, and that is; I thank God I was warring on the gridirons of the Midwest and not on the battlefields of Europe. I can speak confidently and positively that the players of this country would much more, much rather struggle and fight to win the Heisman award than the Croix de Guerre.

Bill Cunningham of the Boston Post wrote in response, "This country's okay as long as it produces Nile Kinnicks. The football part is incidental." AP reporter Whitney Martin wrote, "You realized the ovation (after his Heisman speech) wasn't alone for Nile Kinnick, the outstanding college football player of the year. It was also for Nile Kinnick, typifying everything admirable in American youth." Another observer said that Kinnick's remarks "tackled Demosthenes and threw Cicero for a 15-yard loss." The University of Iowa recently began playing an excerpt from the speech on the Kinnick Stadium scoreboard before "The Star-Spangled Banner" at every Hawkeye home game.

== Inconclusive claims ==
=== Minnesota tryout ===
Nile Kinnick's college choice came down to Iowa and the University of Minnesota. Minnesota was one of the dominant college football programs in the nation, while Iowa was a struggling program. Some sources state that Kinnick traveled to Minneapolis for a tryout with the Gophers, but that the Gophers rejected him. Some even suggest that Minnesota's legendary coach, Bernie Bierman, stated himself that Kinnick was "too small and too slow" to play for Minnesota.

Whether or not this tryout actually took place is unclear. Even as a high school student, Kinnick wrote many letters and kept meticulous journal entries, yet this alleged tryout with Minnesota is never referenced. Nor does Kinnick ever mention the tryout during any of his journal entries or letters when he discusses one of his many games with Iowa against Minnesota. Also, by early 1937, Bierman called Kinnick "one of the finest young backs I have ever seen." That would represent a significant change of opinion on Bierman's part in a very short period of time. One author wrote, "When it was time for college, there was no doubt that Nile would go to Iowa."

The Universities of Iowa and Minnesota have been fierce rivals for a long time, and it is possible that the story of Kinnick's interest in Minnesota was embellished at some point, by fans of either school. Kinnick considered enrolling at Minnesota, but how seriously and whether he actually attended a football tryout is uncertain.

=== Michigan confession ===
Another enduring story involves a game between Iowa and Michigan in the late 1930s for the Big Ten Conference title and/or a Rose Bowl berth. Iowa trailed by a few points and threatened to score the winning touchdown on the final play of the game. On the final play, Kinnick was stopped right at the goal line. The officials conferred to discuss if Kinnick had scored, and Kinnick approached the officials to inform them that he had been, in fact, stopped short of the goal, and Michigan went on to win the game.

There are several inconsistencies with this story. First of all, Kinnick's Iowa teams only met Michigan twice, in 1937 and 1939, and at that time, the Big Ten did not send their champion to the Rose Bowl. The Big Ten title was not at stake during the 1937 game for either team, and Michigan did not win the Big Ten title in 1939, even with the victory over Iowa. In retrospect, Iowa could have won the 1939 Big Ten title with a win over Michigan, but Iowa lost the game 27–7, too large a margin for any last-minute Kinnick heroics. Iowa did lose the 1937 game at Michigan by a 7–6 score, but no written account of the game includes this controversial score.

Apocryphal claims about Kinnick's "Michigan confession" likely are rooted in the 1940 Cornell-Dartmouth game.

=== 1939 Notre Dame game ===
Iowa defeated Notre Dame in 1939, 7–6, in a game that many consider to be Kinnick's signature performance. Iowa's only touchdown was scored when Nile Kinnick switched to right halfback for the first time all season from his usual left halfback spot, and the Notre Dame defense was caught unprepared by the switch. Bill Reichardt, a terrific Iowa fullback who would later be named the Big Ten MVP in 1951, claimed that Al Couppee, Iowa's quarterback, was not in the game on that touchdown play.

Reichardt describes the touchdown this way. "They originally called right halfback Buzz Dean's play in the huddle. But Dean said, 'I can't take it. I've got a separated shoulder.' Then they turned to Kinnick and said, 'Can you take it, Nile?' Kinnick responded, 'I think I've got a couple of broken ribs on my right side, so let's run the play to the left side.'" This story regarding Kinnick's statement about broken ribs and with Kinnick, not Couppee, coming up with the idea for the switch to right halfback is particularly enduring.

It is unlikely that Reichardt's story is true. His story is refuted by almost everyone on the 1939 Iowa team. Couppee states in his autobiography that he was indeed in the game for Kinnick's touchdown. Couppee called a rare huddle, in which Couppee called the play shifting Kinnick to the right halfback position. Teammates Erwin Prasse and George "Red" Frye substantiate Couppee's version, but neither of them refuted that Kinnick was injured on a previous play.

== After 1939 ==
=== Plans ===
Kinnick was elected student body president during his senior year at Iowa. A member of the Phi Kappa Psi fraternity at Iowa, Kinnick also maintained a 3.4 GPA. As he neared graduation with a degree in economics, he was one of thirty students selected to the Phi Beta Kappa fraternity, and the university president informed him that he would graduate "with distinction", Iowa's equivalent to graduating cum laude. He gave the commencement speech for the University of Iowa's graduating class in 1940.

Kinnick was the leading vote-getter in the nation for the College All-Star Game, while his coach, Eddie Anderson, was voted in to coach the team against Iowa alum Joe Laws and the NFL champion Green Bay Packers. The Packers defeated the College All-Stars, 45–28. Kinnick scored two touchdowns and kicked four extra points. It was noted that the All-Stars scored four touchdowns while Kinnick was in the game; when he sat on the bench, they mustered just one first down.

Kinnick rejected several lucrative offers to play professional football. He was drafted by the Brooklyn Dodgers, and the team owner offered to pay him a $10,000 annual salary or on a game-by-game basis for $1,000 a game. Instead of going into professional football, he entered the University of Iowa College of Law. After one year of law school, Kinnick ranked third in his class academically.

He also had an interest in politics. Kinnick, himself the grandson of a Governor, spoke before the Young Republicans and introduced 1940 presidential candidate Wendell Willkie at a campaign rally. Kinnick said, "When the members of any nation have come to regard their country as nothing more than the plot of ground on which they reside, and their government as a mere organization for providing police or contracting treaties; when they have ceased to entertain any warmer feelings for one another than those which interest or personal friendship or a mere general philanthropy may produce, the moral dissolution of that nation is at hand." The Marion Sentinel proposed in an article to endorse a presidential run for Kinnick in 1956, the first year in which he would be eligible. While at the University of Iowa he met sculptor Dora Eaton Mason and agreed to pose for a bust. Kinnick had seen a bust of his grandfather in the state house and stated he hoped that someday he would merit the honor to be like his grandfather.

While Kinnick took a year of law school in 1940, he also served as an assistant football coach for the Hawkeyes, aiding the freshman team and scouting upcoming opponents. He accompanied the team to South Bend to see Iowa upset the Irish for the second straight season. According to The Daily Iowan's account, "Nile Kinnick, cool, calm, and collected while he's on a football team, pranced up and down the dressing room almost jabbering in his excitement." He was also an assistant football coach at Iowa in 1941.

=== Naval service ===
Kinnick left law school after one year and enlisted in the Naval Air Reserve. After completing a speaking tour of Iowa communities and visiting his parents in Omaha, he reported for induction three days before the attack on Pearl Harbor. He wrote, "There is no reason in the world why we shouldn't fight for the preservation of a chance to live freely, no reason why we shouldn't suffer to uphold that which we want to endure. May God give me the courage to do my duty and not falter." Later, he added, "Every man whom I've admired in history has willingly and courageously served in his country's armed forces in times of danger. It is not only a duty but an honor to follow their example the best I know how. May God give me the courage and ability to so conduct myself in every situation that my country, my family, and my friends will be proud of me."

Kinnick was able to return to Iowa one last time in 1942. He visited Adel and saw his father one final time. He then went to Iowa City and watched Iowa's football game against Washington University from the press box. When the Iowa crowd heard of his presence, they began a loud "We want Kinnick!" chant until he leaned out of the press box with an appreciative wave.

Kinnick was training to be a fighter pilot. "The task which lies ahead is adventure as well as duty," Nile wrote in his final letter to his parents before deploying with the USS Lexington in late May 1943, "and I am anxious to get at it. I feel better in mind and body than I have for ten years and am quite certain I can meet the foe confident and unafraid. 'I have set the Lord always before me, because He is at my right hand. I shall not be moved.' Truly, we have shared to the full life, love, and laughter. Comforted in the knowledge that your thought and prayer go with us every minute, and sure that your faith and courage will never falter, no matter the outcome, I bid you au revoir."

== Death ==
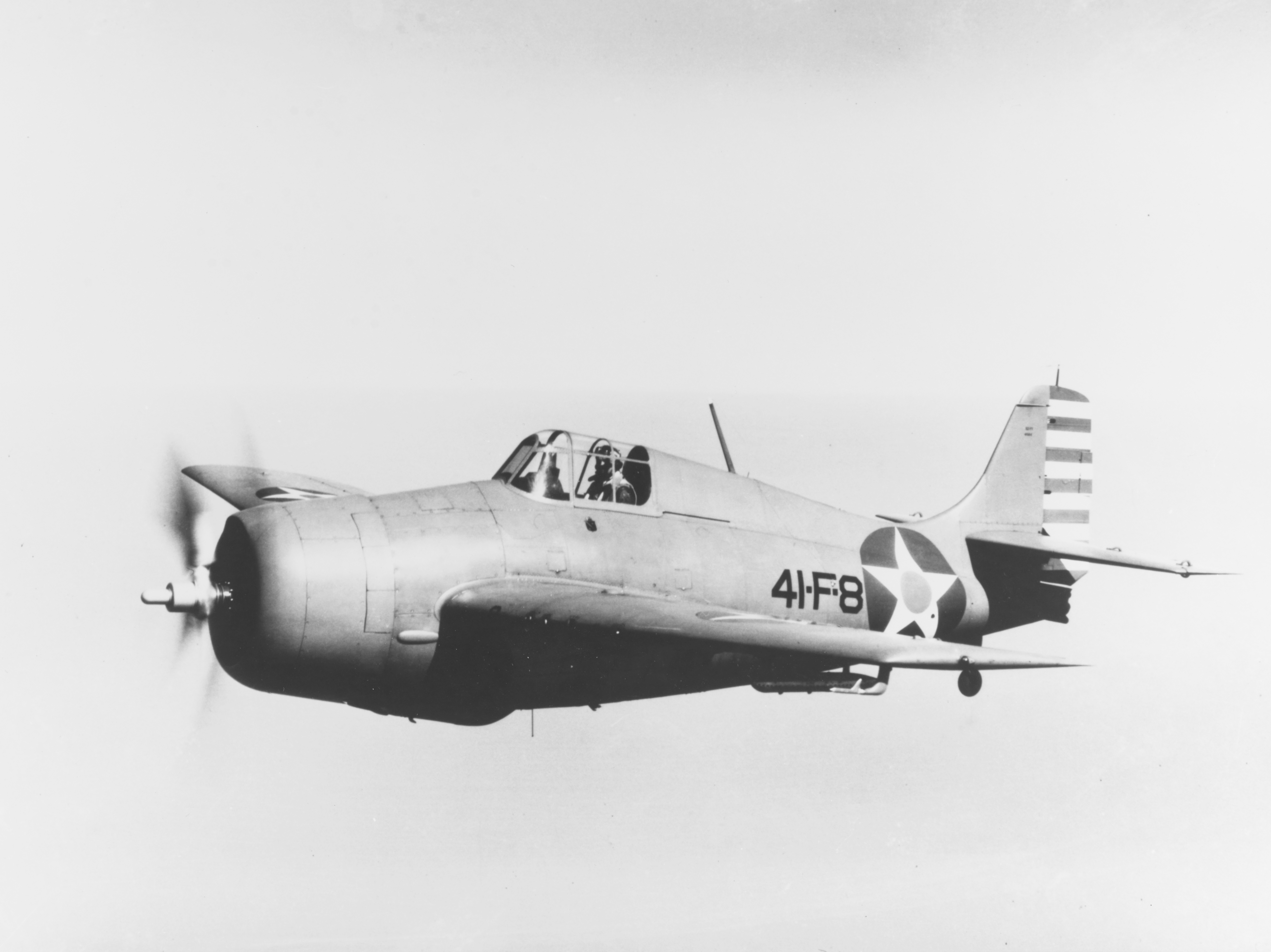
A Grumman F4F-4 in US Navy service, very similar to Kinnick's, 1942.

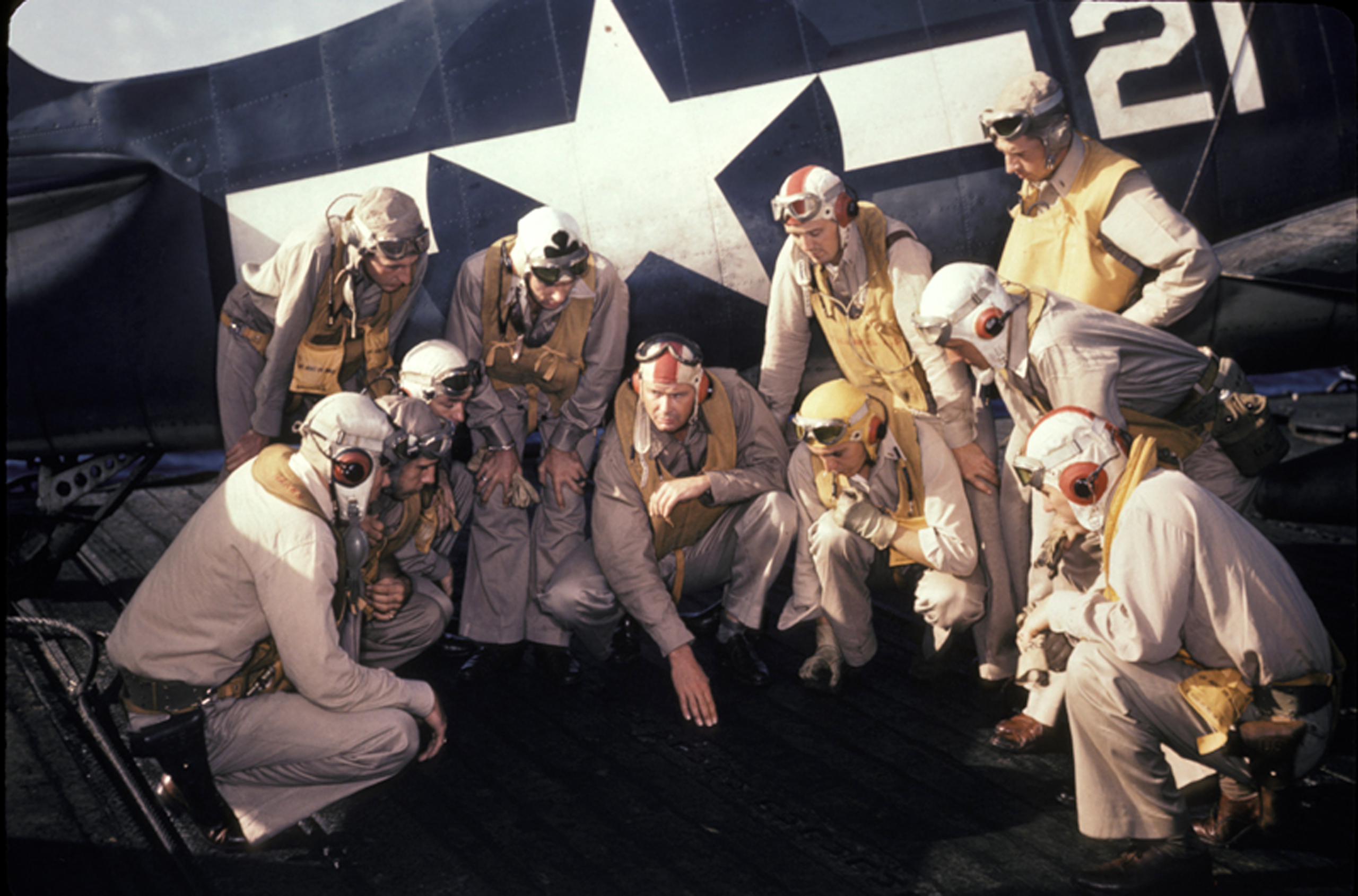
Pilots of Kinnick's squadron, VF-16, briefed by LCDR Paul D. Buie aboard USS Lexington. This picture was taken a few months after Kinnick's death.

On June 2, 1943, Ensign Kinnick was on a routine training flight from the aircraft carrier USS Lexington off the coast of Venezuela in the Gulf of Paria. He had been flying for over an hour when his Grumman F4F Wildcat developed an oil leak so serious that he could neither reach land nor the Lexington, whose flight deck was already crowded with planes preparing for launch anyway. He followed standard military procedure and executed an emergency landing in the water, but died in the process. Rescue boats arrived on the scene eight minutes later, but found only an oil slick. His body was never recovered. He was one month and seven days away from his 25th birthday, and was the first Heisman Trophy winner to die.

Iowa sportscaster Tait Cummins said, "Kinnick proved one thing, that college athletics could be beautiful. Everything that can be said that is good about college athletics he was. He didn't represent it... he was it."

In a letter to Kinnick's parents, his lieutenant commander Paul Buie wrote, "Having lost all oil the engine, without lubrication, failed, forcing Nile to land in the water." Kinnick's squadron mate, Bill Reiter, also confirmed that the oil leak was so bad that Kinnick was forced to land four miles before he could reach the Lexington. This varies slightly from the often-repeated legend that Kinnick could have made it back to the ship but instead chose to land in the water to spare the ship's crew from danger. While Kinnick gave his life for his country, the decision to land his plane in the water was standard military procedure, and a landing on the Lexington in his situation was an impossibility rather than a deliberately bypassed option.

There is also some uncertainty about exactly how Kinnick died. Reiter was the only person who claimed to have seen Kinnick clear of the plane and motionless in the water. Reiter died three months later. Since Kinnick's body was never found, it is possible that he was still tethered to the plane when it sank. Dick Tosaw, whose brother played high school football with Kinnick, repeatedly pursued the idea of finding Kinnick's plane and making a monument at Kinnick Stadium or Kinnick's first high school, Adel–De Soto–Minburn High School. The possibility, however remote, that Kinnick's body is still with the plane led to overwhelming opposition to Tosaw's efforts; Kinnick's father opposed the idea, saying that it would be like digging up his son's grave. Kinnick's teammates also unanimously opposed the idea. Such strong opposition from Kinnick's teammates, relatives, and fans stopped Tosaw's plans.

== Legacy ==
=== Honors ===
Numerous honors for Nile Kinnick have been created since his death. During the United States occupation of Japan, the Eighth Army renamed Meiji Jingu Gaien Stadium in Tokyo "Nile Kinnick Stadium." A high school in Yokosuka, Japan, for dependents of military personnel is named Nile C. Kinnick High School. The coin flipped at the start of every Big Ten football game bears his image, and each captain of a Big Ten team receives one such coin at the end of the year. Shortly after his death, a memorial fund was established at the University of Iowa in his honor. The Nile Kinnick Memorial Scholarship is awarded annually to outstanding student-athletes at Iowa.

His number #24 has been retired, one of only two Iowa football numbers so recognized (Cal Jones' #62 is the other). He was inducted into the College Football Hall of Fame in the Hall's inaugural year in 1951, one of only two Hawkeye players so honored (Duke Slater was the other).

In 1989, Iowa fans selected an all-time University of Iowa football team during the 100th anniversary celebration of Iowa football. Nile Kinnick was not only selected to the team as a halfback, he was voted the team's MVP, or the most valuable player in the first century of Iowa football. Kinnick was one of just five football players inducted into the Iowa Sports Hall of Fame in the Hall's inaugural year in 1951, joining Duke Slater, Aubrey Devine, Jay Berwanger, and Elmer Layden. In 1999, Sports Illustrated selected Nile Kinnick as the third greatest sports figure in the history of the state of Iowa, behind only Dan Gable and Kinnick's youth baseball teammate, Bob Feller.

College Football News ranked Kinnick as the ninth greatest college football player of all time. An Iowa City theater produced a play based on Kinnick's life. Four books have been written about Nile Kinnick and the 1939 Hawkeyes.

Sports Illustrated chose Kinnick as a starting defensive cornerback on its all-20th century college football team (players in Kinnick's time played both offense and defense, and sometimes special teams as well). Deion Sanders was the other starting cornerback. The reserve cornerbacks were Rod Woodson, Charles Woodson, Jim Thorpe, and John Lattner.

=== Renaming Iowa Stadium ===
Calls to rename Iowa Stadium in Nile Kinnick's honor came immediately after the Heisman trophy winner's death in 1943. In November 1945 the University of Iowa student body voted to rededicate the structure as "Nile Kinnick Memorial Stadium". The other options on the student ballot were "Memorial Stadium" and "Robert Jones Stadium", after the first University of Iowa student to be killed in World War II.

Upon announcement of the student vote the new name was taken up by The Daily Iowan student newspaper, World Almanac, and other sources. However, the student vote was unofficial and efforts to rename the stadium were never pursued by the university.

In 1972 "Nile Kinnick Stadium" was again proposed by Cedar Rapids Gazette sportswriter Gus Schrader, who had previously supported the students' efforts. This time the lobbying campaign was successful, and the stadium was officially renamed later that year.

The Hawkeyes' first home game that year was with Oregon State, and a pre-game ceremony on September 23 made it official: Iowa Stadium became known as Nile Kinnick Stadium. Kinnick's father took part in the ceremony and seemed genuinely pleased.

Kinnick Stadium is the only college football stadium named for a Heisman Trophy winner. In 2006, Iowa finished renovations on Kinnick Stadium. As part of those renovations, the school dedicated a 14-foot (4.3 m) bronze statue of Kinnick in front of the stadium on September 1, the day before the opening game. Included in the ceremonies was a speech by head coach Kirk Ferentz, as well as a fly-over of a replication of the plane Kinnick flew in World War II. Iowa also placed a 9-by-16-foot (2.7 m × 4.9 m) bronze relief on the wall of the stadium, depicting Kinnick's 1939 game-winning touchdown run against Notre Dame.

== See also ==
- List of NCAA major college yearly punt and kickoff return leaders
- Nile C. Kinnick High School in Japan
- Meiji Jingu Gaien Stadium in Tokyo, named "Nile Kinnick Stadium" during the occupation of Japan
