= Gilbert Community School District =

Public school district in Gilbert, Iowa, United States

Coordinates: 41.662855°N 92.018800°W

Location
- Gilbert, Iowa Story County and Boone County United States
- Coordinates: 41.662855, -92.018800

District information
- Type: Local school district
- Grades: K-12
- Superintendent: Christine Trujillo
- Schools: 4
- Budget: $25,458,000 (2020-21)
- NCES District ID: 1912510

Students and staff
- Students: 1697 (2022-23)
- Teachers: 104.40 FTE
- Staff: 115.30 FTE
- Student–teacher ratio: 16.25
- Athletic conference: Raccoon River
- District mascot: Tigers
- Colors: Red and Black

Other information
- Website: www.gilbertcsd.org

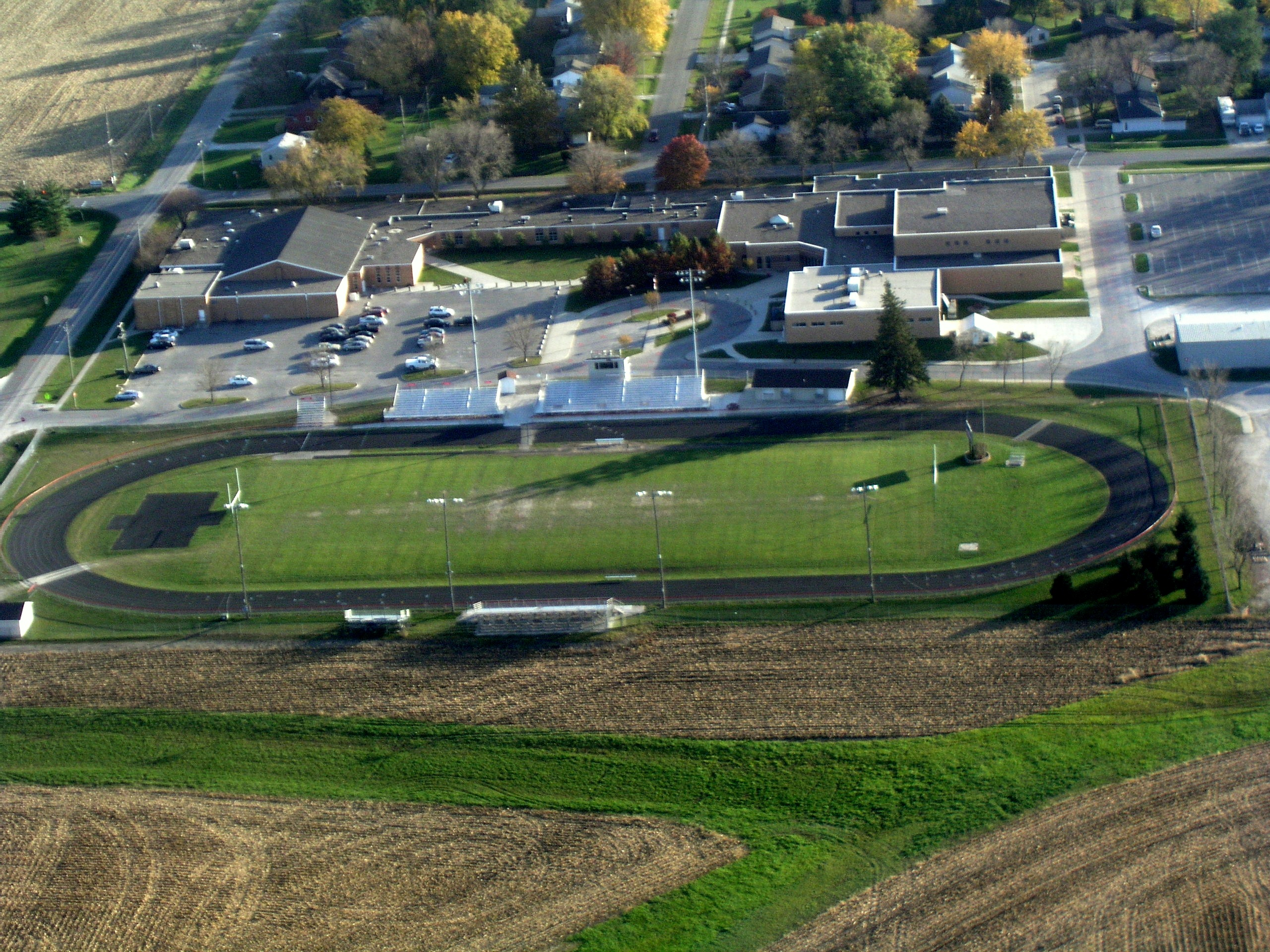
The former Gilbert Senior High School, now the Gilbert Intermediate School

Gilbert Community School District is a rural public school district headquartered in Gilbert, Iowa.

The district is mostly in Story County but has a portion in Boone County. The district serves Gilbert and sections of northern Ames.

The district covers 48 square miles.

== List of Schools ==
The Gilbert Community Schools consists of Gilbert Elementary, Gilbert Intermediate School, the Gilbert Middle School, and Gilbert High School. The grade structure is a K–2, 3–5, 6–8, and 9–12 system.

== Enrollment ==
As of 2006, the enrollment had increased by more than 55% since 1990, with the number of students climbing to over 1,061 as of July 2006. Many students live in the northern part of Ames. Enrollment in the district increased by eight percent during the 2005–2006 school year. The school board, anticipating that it will build another elementary school within a few years if the district continues to grow at its current pace, has obtained an option to buy 20 acres (81,000 m^{2}) just west of Gilbert's residential area and on the north side of the main highway through town. From 2006 to 2020, the enrollment grew an additional 41%.

== See also ==
- List of school districts in Iowa
- List of high schools in Iowa
