= Dallas Center–Grimes Community School District =

Public school district in Dallas Center, Iowa, United States

Coordinates: 41.676932°N 93.961011°W

Location
- Grimes, Iowa Polk County and Dallas County United States
- Coordinates: 41.676932, -93.961011

District information
- Type: Local school district
- Grades: K–12
- Established: 1964
- Superintendent: Scott Blum
- Schools: 8
- Budget: $52,476,000 (2022-23)
- NCES District ID: 1908520

Students and staff
- Students: 3767 (2022-23)
- Teachers: 231.79 FTE
- Staff: 195.93 FTE
- Student–teacher ratio: 16.25
- Athletic conference: Little Hawkeye
- District mascot: Mustangs
- Colors: Red and white

Other information
- Website: DC-G District Website; DC-G Activities Website

Dallas Center–Grimes Community School District is a rural public school district headquartered in Grimes, Iowa.

The district is in Polk County and in Dallas County. It serves Dallas Center, All of Grimes (but Johnston border & parts of NE Grimes), and sections of Urbandale. There's 2 Zip Codes in this District which are: 50063 (Dallas Center & Rural Dallas County) & 50111 (Grimes & Urbandale)

== Schools ==
Secondary:

- Dallas Center–Grimes High School (grades 9–12)
- Dallas Center-Grimes Oak View Middle School (grades 7–8)

Primary:

- Dallas Center Elementary School (grades K-4)
- Heritage Elementary School (grades K-4)
- North Ridge Elementary School (grades K-4)
- South Prairie Elementary School (grades K-4)
- Dallas Center-Grimes Middle School (grades 5-6)

Preschool:

- Dallas Center-Grimes Preschool @ Heritage Elementary School [ages 3–4]

Administration/Extra:

- Dallas Center-Grimes Administration

=== Athletics ===
The DCG Mustangs compete in the Little Hawkeye Conference and offer the following sports:

Dallas Center-Grimes High School Athletics:

- Baseball
- Basketball (boys and girls)
  - Boys' 2022 Class 3A State Champions
- Bowling (boys and girls)
- Cross country (boys and girls)
  - Boys' 3-time Class 3A State Champions (2019, 2020, 2021)
- Football
- Golf (boys and girls)
- Soccer (boys and girls)
  - Girls' 4-time Class 2A State Champions (2022, 2023, 2024, 2025)
- Softball
- Swimming (boys and girls)
- Tennis (boys and girls)
- Track and field (boys and girls)
- Volleyball
- Wrestling (boys and girls)

== Notable alumni ==
- Tony Watson
- Paige Lowary
- Ajon Ervin
- Ike Eddy

== Enrollment ==
View source data.

== See also ==
- List of school districts in Iowa
- List of high schools in Iowa
