= Winterset Community School District =

Public school district in Winterset, Iowa, United States

Coordinates: 41.333118°N 94.015157°W

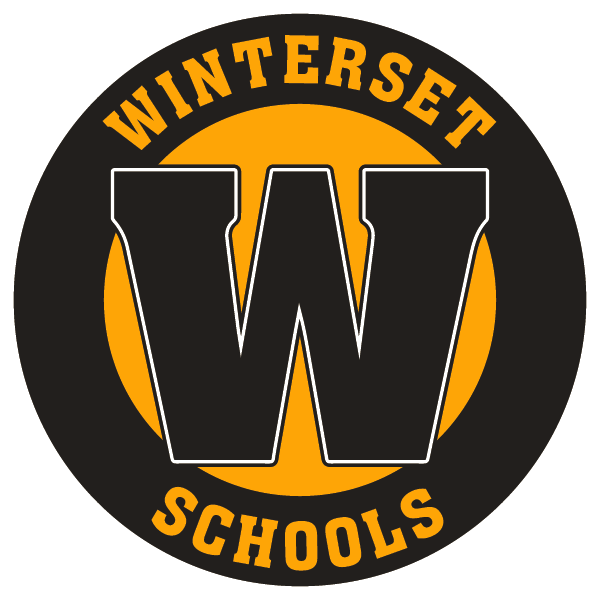

Location
- Winterset, Iowa Madison County United States
- Coordinates: 41.333118, -94.015157

District information
- Type: Local school district
- Grades: K-12
- Superintendent: Justin Gross
- Schools: 4
- Budget: $27,837,000 (2020-21)
- NCES District ID: 1931860

Students and staff
- Students: 1683 (2022-23)
- Teachers: 115.65 FTE
- Staff: 119.68 FTE
- Student–teacher ratio: 14.55
- Athletic conference: Raccoon River
- District mascot: Huskies
- Colors: Black and Gold

Other information
- Website: www.winterset.k12.ia.us

The Winterset Community School District (Winterset Community Schools or Winterset Schools), is a rural public school district headquartered in Winterset, Iowa.

The district is completely within Madison County. The district serves Winterset and the surrounding rural areas, including the towns of East Peru and Patterson.

Justin Gross was hired as superintendent in 2020, after serving as Associate Superintendent of School Improvement at Nevada.

The school mascot is the Huskies, and their colors are black and gold.

== History ==
On July 1, 2026, the Orient-Macksburg Community School District dissolved, and the Winterset district took territory from the former district.

== Schools ==
The district operates four schools, all in Winterset:

- Winterset Elementary School
- Winterset Middle School
- Winterset Junior High School
- Winterset Senior High School

== Winterset High School ==
=== Athletics ===
The Huskies compete in the Raccoon River Conference in the following sports:

==== Fall Sports ====
- Cross Country (boys and girls)
  - Boys' 1960 Class A State Champions
- Swimming (girls)
- Volleyball (girls)
- Football

==== Winter Sports ====
- Basketball (boys and girls)
- Wrestling
  - 1994 Class 2A State Duals Champions
- Swimming (boys)

==== Spring Sports ====
- Track and Field (boys and girls)
  - Boys' - 2-time Class A State Champions (1963, 1967)
- Golf (boys and girls)
- Tennis (boys and girls)
- Soccer (girls)

==== Summer Sports ====
- Baseball
- Softball
  - 4-time State Champions-2008 (3A), 2017, 2020, 2022 (all 4A)

== See also ==
- List of school districts in Iowa
- List of high schools in Iowa
