= Nile C. Kinnick High School =

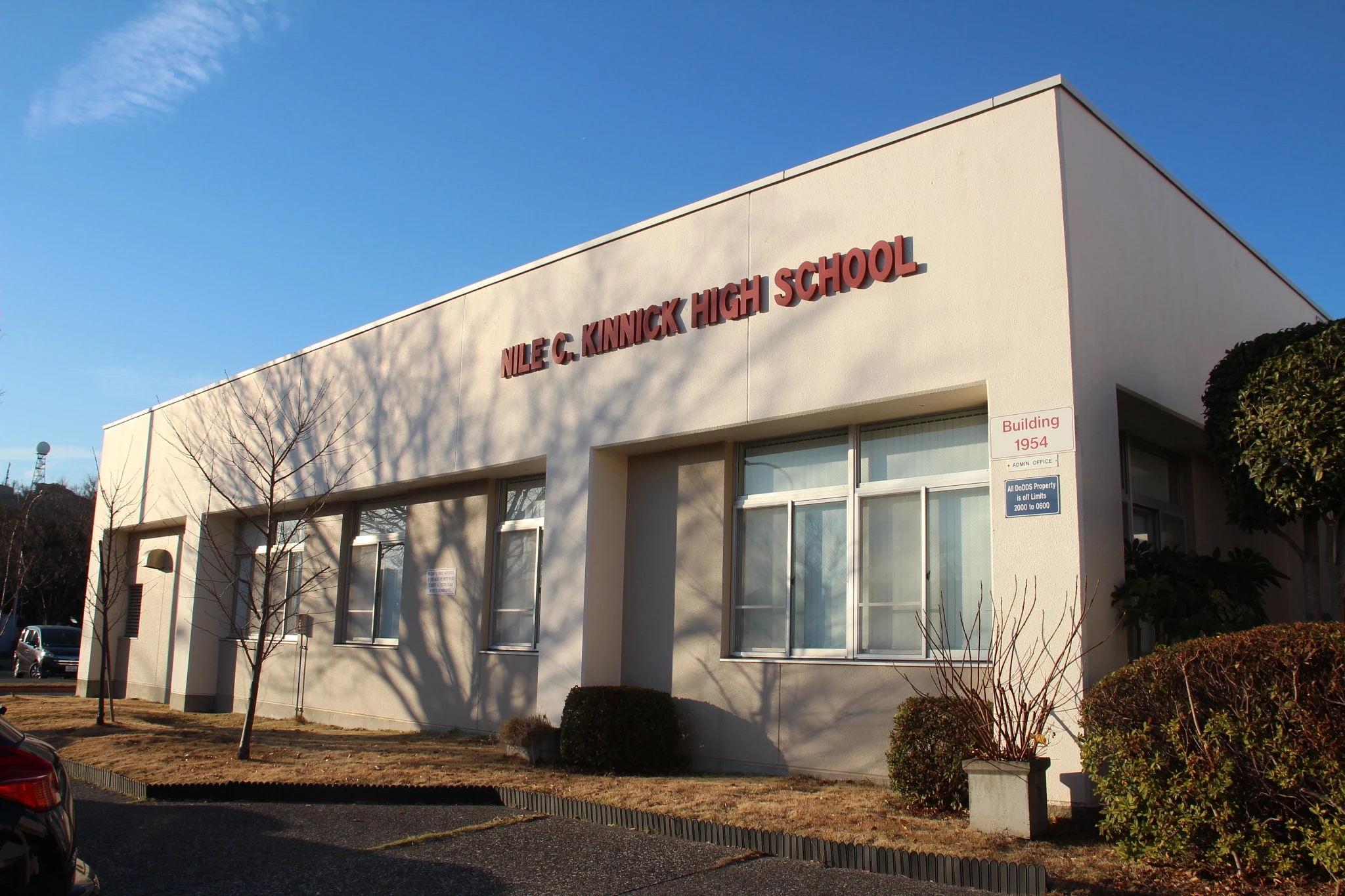

Location
- US Fleet Activities Yokosuka; Japan; 35°17′24″N 139°40′30″E

Information
- Type: DoDEA high school
- Motto: Home of the Red Devils
- Established: 1947 (79 years ago)
- CEEB code: 561940
- Principal: Kira Hurst
- Grades: 9–12
- Enrollment: 657
- Colors: Red and white
- Song: Alma Mater (Tune: "Far above Cayuga’s Waters")
- Fight song: Fight Song (Tune: "Our Director")
- Mascot: Red Devils
- Nickname: Yo-Hi Devils
- Team name: Red Devils
- Website: kinnickhs.dodea.edu

Nile C. Kinnick High School is a U.S. military-operated school that originally opened in Yokohama, Japan in 1946 during the occupation after World War II. The school later moved to US Fleet Activities Yokosuka, Japan in 1971, but kept the Yo-Hi Red Devils mascot to honor the school's beginnings.

The school was formally named after Nile Clarke Kinnick Jr. in 1990, though the name had been in use for decades prior. Kinnick High School usually has around 600 students and is about 45 kilometers (28 mi) from Tokyo.

== Notable alumni ==
- Mark Hamill, actor
- Crystal Kay, singer
- MadeinTYO, rapper
- 24hrs, rapper and older brother of MadeinTYO
