= Newtown High School =

Newtown High School may refer to:

- Newtown High School (Connecticut)
- Newtown High School (Queens), New York City
- Newtown High School of the Performing Arts, New South Wales
- Newtown High School, Powys, Wales
- Newtown High, a fictional TV show on the TV series Big Time Rush

== See also ==
- Newton High School (disambiguation)
