= Adel–De Soto–Minburn Community School District =

Public school district in Adel, Iowa, United States

Coordinates: 41.618557°N 94.022363°W

Adel–De Soto–Minburn (ADM) Community School District

Location
- Adel, Iowa Dallas and Madison counties United States
- Coordinates: 41.618557, -94.022363

District information
- Type: Public school district
- Grades: K–12
- Established: 1993
- Superintendent: Greg Dufoe
- Schools: 4
- Budget: $29,639,000 (2020-21)
- NCES District ID: 1903150

Students and staff
- Students: 2254 (2022-23)
- Teachers: 150.57 FTE
- Staff: 167.01 FTE
- Student–teacher ratio: 14.97
- Athletic conference: Raccoon River Conference
- District mascot: Tigers
- Colors: Scarlet and Black

Other information
- Website: www.admschools.org

The Adel DeSoto Minburn (ADM) School District is a public school district in the Des Moines Metro headquartered in Adel, Iowa.

The district, mostly in Dallas County, includes a small portion in Madison County. It serves the Iowa communities of Adel, De Soto, and Minburn, and is located on the west edge of the Des Moines Metro area.

ADM has consistently been recognized for high levels of academic achievement as measured by the Iowa Department of Education's Iowa School Performance Profiles. ADM high school has regularly been identified as one of the top 5 high schools in Iowa and the best high school in the Des Moines Metro by US News. ADM has been recognized by the Belin-Blank Center for Gifted Education and Talent Development as a STEM (science, technology, engineering, math) innovator and offers high school Project Lead the Way courses in engineering and biomedical science, a STEM Excellence and Leadership program for middle school students, and an innovative agricultural technology curriculum. Among several notable alumni is Nile Kinnick, Iowa's only Heisman Trophy winner as a scholar and athlete at The University of Iowa in 1939, who attended school in the district until his junior year.

== History ==
The district formed on July 1, 1993, as a result of the merger of the Adel–De Soto Community School District and the Central Dallas Community School District.

=== Enrollment ===
View source data.

== Schools ==
- ADM High School
  - ADM High School is located in Adel and serves students in grades 9–12. The high school was constructed in 1986 with an addition added in 2015.
  - In 2026, ADM High School was ranked as the 5th best high school in Iowa and the #1 high school in the Des Moines Metro Iowa by US News.
- ADM Middle School
  - ADM Middle School is located in Adel, serves students in grades 7–8. The middle school was constructed in 2006 with an addition added in 2015.
  - In 2022, ADM Middle School was ranked as the 3rd highest scoring middle school in Iowa as measured by the Iowa Department of Educations Iowa School Performance Profiles and been recognized as a model professional learning community by Solution Tree.
- DeSoto Intermediate
  - DeSoto Intermediate is located in De Soto, and serves students in grades 5-6. The original building was constructed in 1922, with gymnasium and classroom additions completed in 1990 and additional classroom additions added in 2015.
  - On the night of Tuesday, April 18, 2023, an AC unit on the roof of the building caused a fire, affecting 4 classrooms and cancelling classes the next day. No one was injured.
- Meadow View Elementary
  - Meadow View Elementary is located in Adel and serves students in grades 2-4. Meadow View Elementary was constructed in 2021.
- Adel Elementary
  - Adel Elementary is located in Adel, and serves students in grades PS–1. The original building was constructed in 1965, with additions in 1969, 1990, 2006, and 2015.

== ADM High School ==
=== Athletics ===
The ADM Tigers compete in the Raccoon River Conference and offer the following sports:

==== Men's sports ====
- Baseball
- Basketball
- Bowling
- Cross Country
- Football
- Golf
  - Boys' - 1984 Class 2A state champions
- Soccer
- Swimming
- Tennis
- Track & Field
- Wrestling
  - 1970 Class A state champions
- Football
  - 1933 state champions Source:

==== Women's Sports ====
- Basketball
- Bowling
- Cross Country
  - Girls' 1968 state champions
- Golf
- Soccer
- Softball
  - 1970 state champions
  - 2026 State 4A Champions
- Swimming
- Tennis
- Track & Field
  - 2025 Class 3A State Champions
- Volleyball
- Wrestling

==== CO-ED ====
- Dance *2025 Class II Hoopla State Champions
- Cheer- 2025 Class 3A Stunt Group Champions
- eSports

== See also ==
- List of school districts in Iowa
- List of high schools in Iowa
