= Bondurant, Iowa =

- City
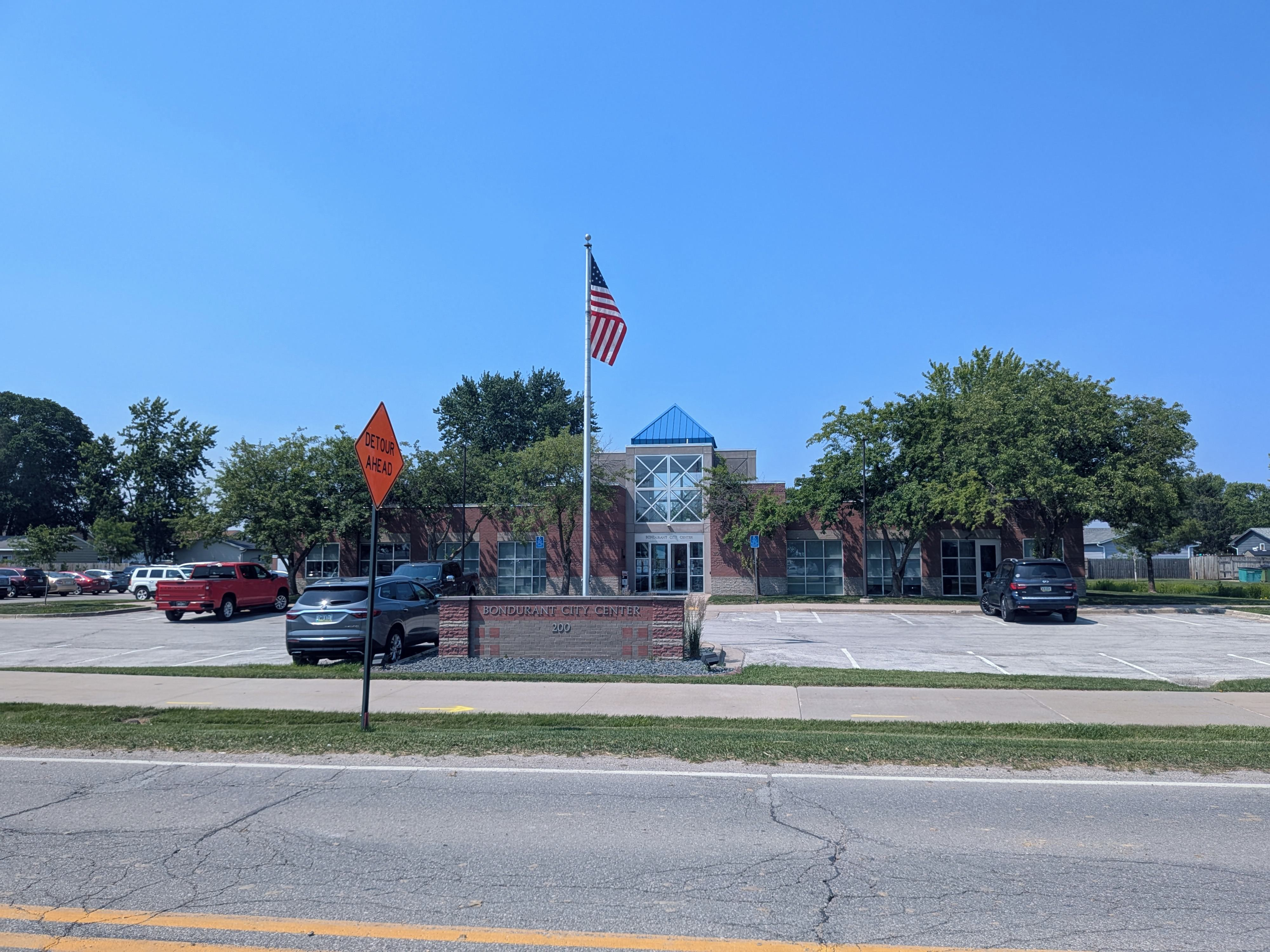
- Bondurant City Center

- Logo
- Motto: "on the move"
- Location within Polk County and Iowa
- Coordinates: 41°41′55″N 93°27′24″W
- Country: United States
- State: Iowa
- County: Polk
- Townships: Franklin, Clay, Douglas, Beaver
- Founded: 1884
- Incorporated: December 23, 1897

Area
  - Total: 8.78 sq mi (22.73 km^{2})
  - Land: 8.75 sq mi (22.66 km^{2})
  - Water: 0.027 sq mi (0.07 km^{2})
- Elevation: 958 ft (292 m)

Population (2020)
  - Total: 7,365
  - Density: 996/sq mi (384.4/km^{2})
- Time zone: UTC-6 (Central (CST))
  - Summer (DST): UTC-5 (CDT)
- ZIP code: 50035
- Area code: 515
- FIPS code: 19-07390
- GNIS feature ID: 2394218
- Website: The City of Bondurant, Iowa Website

Bondurant (/ˈbɒndʊəˌrænt/) is a city in Polk County, Iowa, United States. The population was 7,365 in the 2020 census, an increase of 90.8% from the 3,860 population in 2010. It is part of the Des Moines–West Des Moines metropolitan statistical area.

== History ==
Bondurant was founded in 1884. In 1892, the Chicago Great Western Railway built the Bondurant railway station. Bondurant incorporated as a city on December 23, 1897. The city was named for Alexander C. Bondurant, who was the area's first settler in 1857.

=== 2018 tornado ===
On July 19, 2018, at approximately 3 p.m., an EF2 tornado struck the city and lifted the entire second floor off a house, save for the second-floor bathroom's toilet. The tornado was the second of two EF2 tornadoes that were on the ground simultaneously. The first tornado, which missed Bondurant, provided a clear warning as the second tornado formed shortly afterwards.

== Geography ==
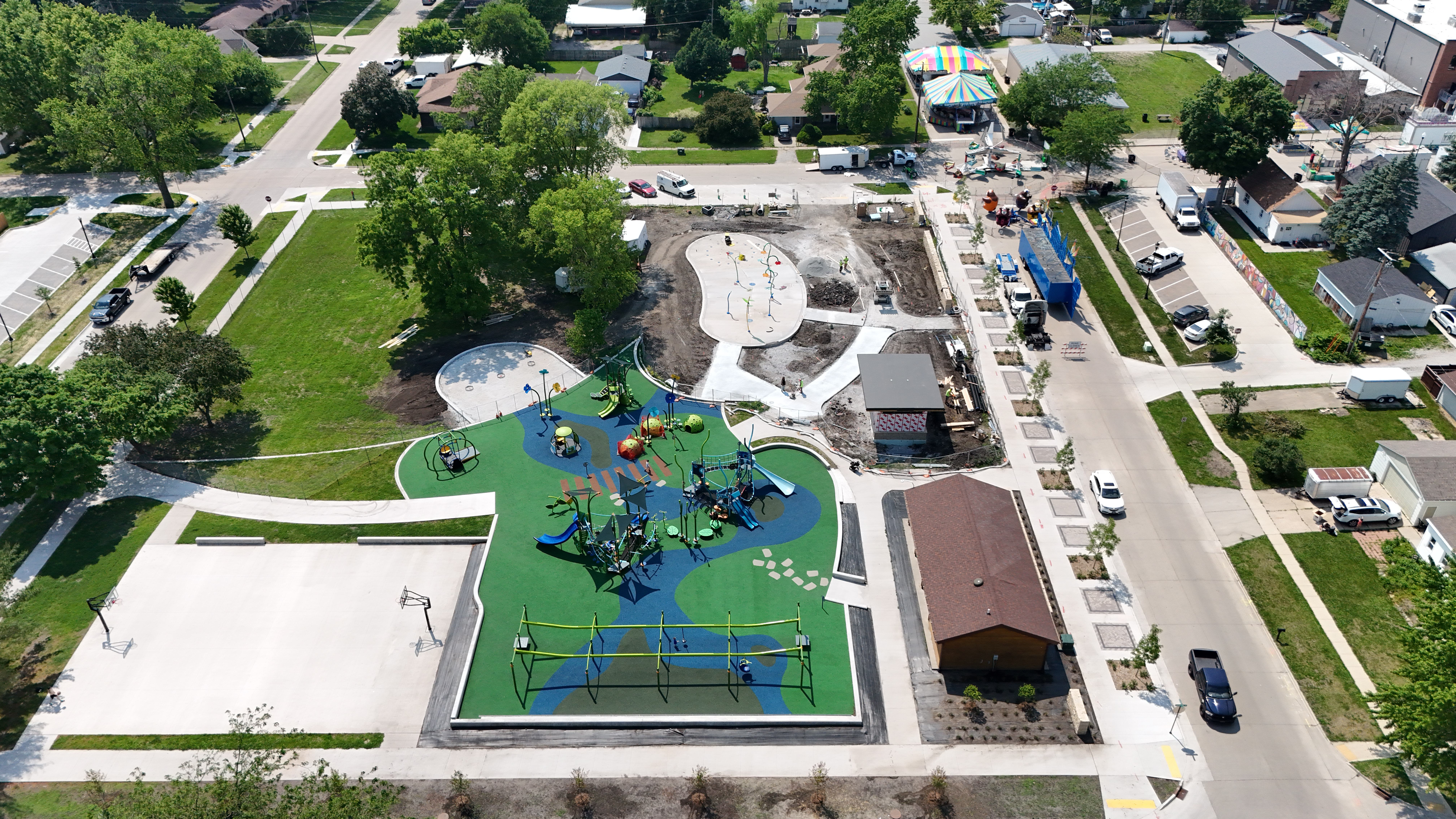
Bondurant city park

According to the United States Census Bureau, the city has a total area of 8.40 square miles (21.76 km^{2}), of which 8.38 square miles (21.70 km^{2}) is land and 0.02 square miles (0.05 km^{2}) is water.

Bondurant is located in the heartland of Iowa, and can be directly accessed by U.S. Route 65 (from the northeast or southwest) or NE 78th Ave (from the west).

== Demographics ==
Historical population
Census	Pop.	Note	%±
1900	297		—
1910	287		−3.4%
1920	274		−4.5%
1930	289		5.5%
1940	320		10.7%
1950	328		2.5%
1960	389		18.6%
1970	462		18.8%
1980	1,283		177.7%
1990	1,584		23.5%
2000	1,846		16.5%
2010	3,860		109.1%
2020	7,365		90.8%
2024 (est.)	9,465	▲	28.5%
U.S. Decennial Census

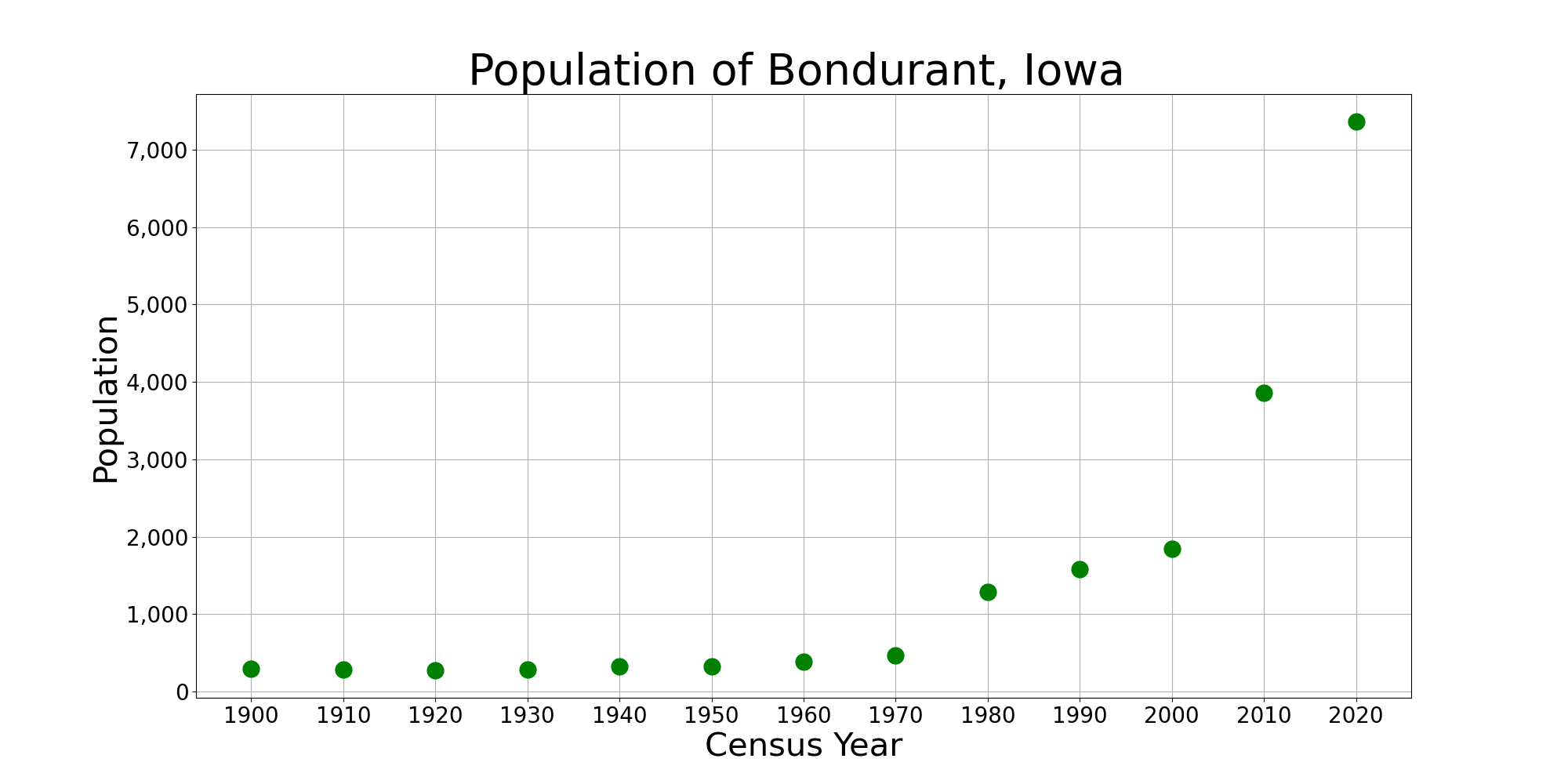
The population of Bondurant, Iowa, from US census data

=== 2020 census ===
As of the 2020 census, there were 7,365 people, 2,337 households, and 1,924 families residing in the city. The population density was 841.8 inhabitants per square mile (325.0/km^{2}). There were 2,376 housing units at an average density of 271.6 per square mile (104.9/km^{2}).

The median age was 31.0 years. 36.2% of residents were under the age of 18. 38.5% of residents were under the age of 20; 3.4% were between the ages of 20 and 24; 34.9% were from 25 to 44; 17.1% were from 45 to 64; and 6.1% were 65 years of age or older. The gender makeup of the city was 50.0% male and 50.0% female. For every 100 females there were 99.9 males, and for every 100 females age 18 and over there were 96.4 males age 18 and over.

94.1% of residents lived in urban areas, while 5.9% lived in rural areas.

Of all households, 56.8% had children under the age of 18 living with them. 67.2% were married-couple households, 7.4% were cohabitating couples, 10.4% were households with a male householder and no spouse or partner present, and 15.0% were households with a female householder and no spouse or partner present. 17.7% of all households were non-families. About 12.7% of all households were made up of individuals and 4.2% had someone living alone who was 65 years of age or older.

Of the city's housing units, 1.6% were vacant. The homeowner vacancy rate was 0.7% and the rental vacancy rate was 3.2%.

Racial composition as of the 2020 census
Race	Number	Percent
White	6,716	91.2%
Black or African American	120	1.6%
American Indian and Alaska Native	16	0.2%
Asian	103	1.4%
Native Hawaiian and Other Pacific Islander	1	0.0%
Some other race	66	0.9%
Two or more races	343	4.7%
Hispanic or Latino (of any race)	288	3.9%

=== 2010 census ===
The 2010 census recorded a population of 3,860 in the city, with a population density of 804/sq mi (310/km^{2}). There were 1,422 housing units, of which 1,362 were occupied.

Of the 1,362 households 1,021 (75%) were families, with 641 families having children under the age of 18. The age population was spread out, with 1279 (33.1%) under the age of 18, 2339 (60.6%) from 18 to 65, and 242 (6.3%) who were 65 or older. The median age was 29.7 years with the male population being 1,931 (50%) and the female population 1,929 (50%).

The racial makeup of the city in the 2010 census was 96.5% White American, 0.6% African American, 0.1% Native Americans in the United States, 0.8% Asian American, 0.0% Native Hawaiians or Pacific Islander American, 0.4% other races and 1.6% were from two or more races. Of those 1.7% were Hispanic and Latino Americans.

=== 2000 census ===
At the 2000 census there were 1,846 people in 659 households, including 508 families, in the city. The population density was 385.9 inhabitants per square mile (149.0/km^{2}). There were 682 housing units at an average density of 142.6 per square mile (55.1/km^{2}). The racial makeup of the city was 98.43% White, 0.22% Native American, 0.16% Asian, 0.33% from other races, and 0.87% from two or more races. Hispanic or Latino of any race were 0.87%.

Of the 659 households, 46.9% had children under the age of 18 living with them, 61.9% were married couples living together, 12.1% had a female householder with no husband present, and 22.9% were non-families. 19.9% of households were one person, and 6.5% were one person aged 65 or older. The average household size was 2.80 and the average family size was 3.24.

The age distribution was 33.1% under the age of 18, 6.4% from 18 to 24, 34.9% from 25 to 44, 19.2% from 45 to 64, and 6.3% 65 or older. The median age was 32 years. For every 100 females, there were 98.1 males. For every 100 females age 18 and over, there were 91.5 males

The median household income was $52,877, and the median family income was $56,989. Males had a median income of $35,000 versus $26,309 for females. The per capita income for the city was $19,196. About 3.1% of families and 5.7% of the population were below the poverty line, including 6.3% of those under age 18 and 7.7% of those age 65 or over.

== Education ==
The Bondurant–Farrar Community School District operates local area public schools.

== Transportation ==
Transit in the city is provided by Des Moines Area Regional Transit. Route 17 provides bus service connecting the city to the region.

== Notable person ==
- Zach Nunn, U.S. representative, former state senator and state representative
