= Hartford, Iowa =

- City
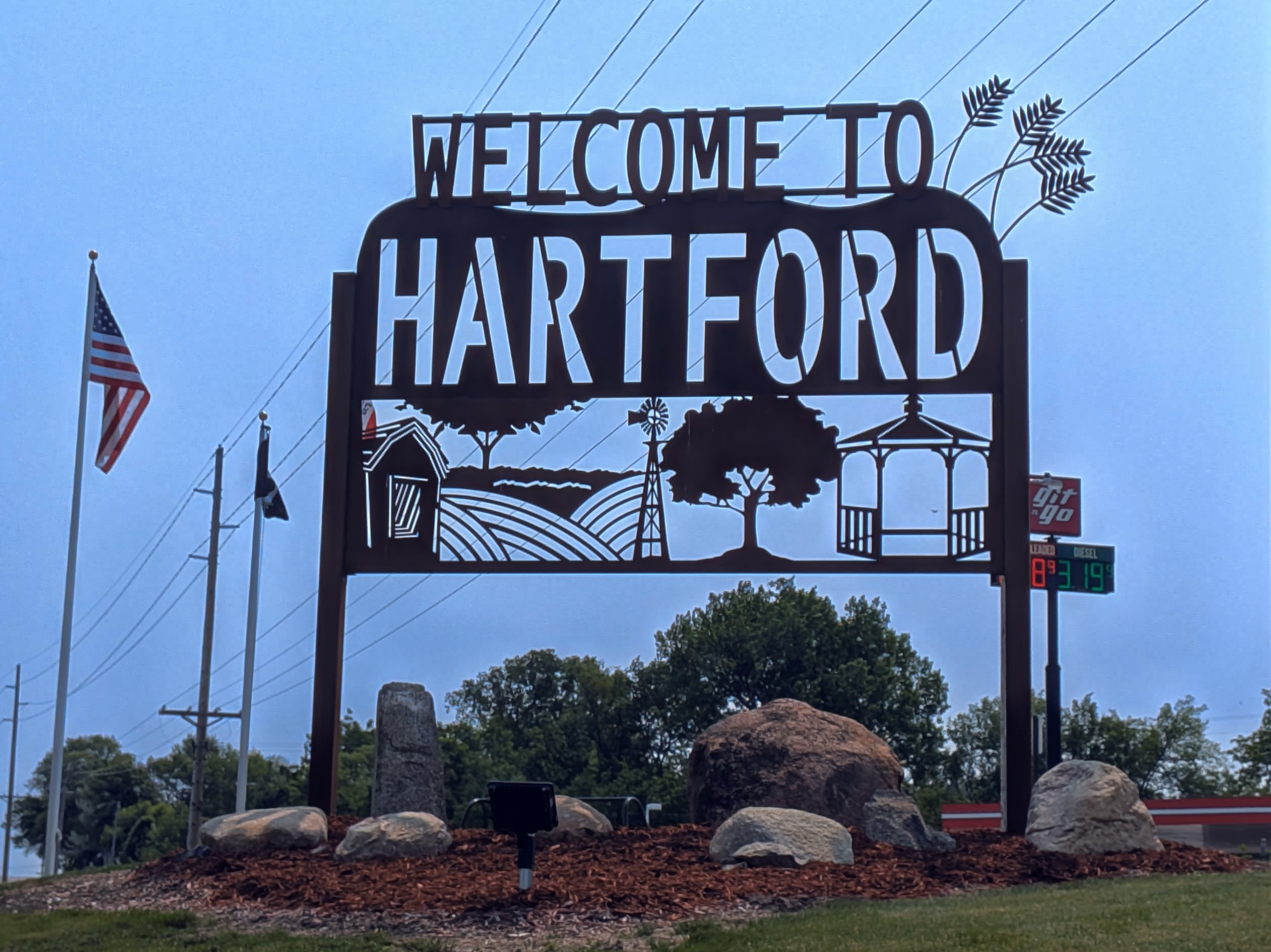
- Hartford Welcome Sign

- Location of Hartford, Iowa
- Coordinates: 41°27′28″N 93°24′14″W
- Country: US
- State: Iowa
- County: Warren

Area
  - Total: 1.09 sq mi (2.82 km^{2})
  - Land: 1.09 sq mi (2.82 km^{2})
  - Water: 0 sq mi (0.00 km^{2})
- Elevation: 889 ft (271 m)

Population (2020)
  - Total: 733
  - Density: 673.9/sq mi (260.19/km^{2})
- Time zone: UTC-6 (Central (CST))
  - Summer (DST): UTC-5 (CDT)
- ZIP code: 50118
- Area code: 515
- FIPS code: 19-34680
- GNIS feature ID: 2394307
- Website: hartfordia.com

Hartford is a city in Warren County, Iowa, United States. The population was 733 at the time of the 2020 census. It is part of the Des Moines–West Des Moines Metropolitan Statistical Area.

== History ==
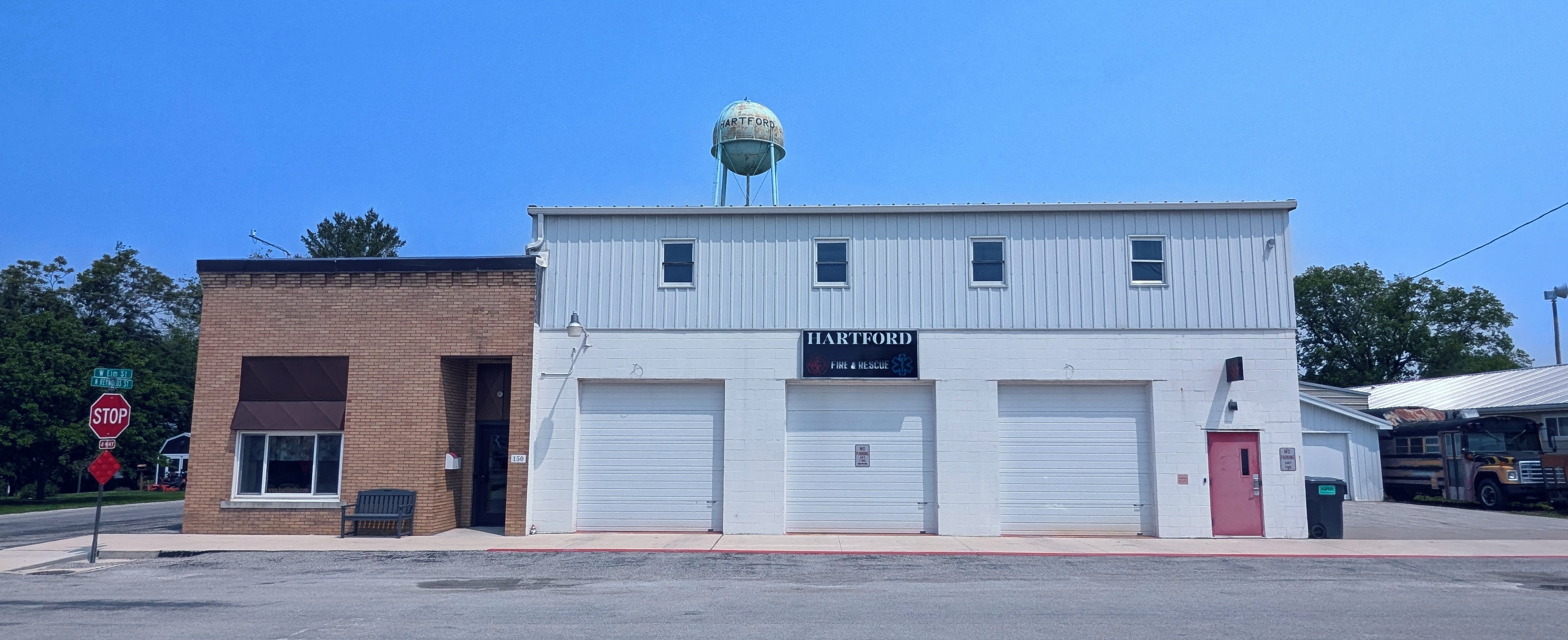
Hartford City Hall (left) and Fire Station (right)

Hartford was laid out in 1849 by John D. Hartman. John D. Hartman was the father of an Indianola mayor.

== Geography ==
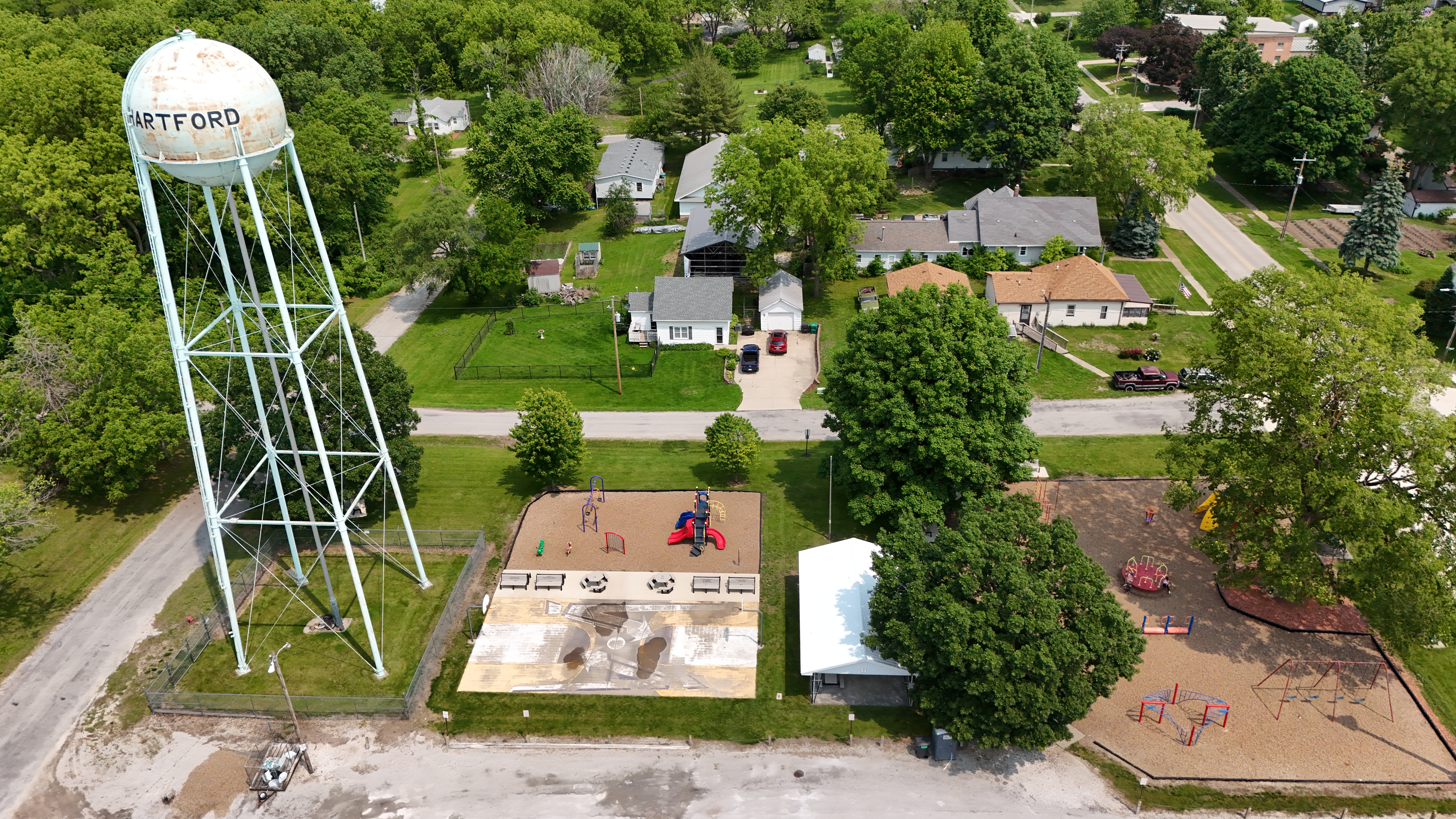
Hartford city park

According to the United States Census Bureau, the city has a total area of 1.03 square miles (2.67 km^{2}), all of it land.

== Demographics ==
Historical populations
Year	Pop.	±%
1880	267	—
1920	218	−18.4%
1930	207	−5.0%
1940	207	+0.0%
1950	221	+6.8%
1960	271	+22.6%
1970	582	+114.8%
1980	761	+30.8%
1990	768	+0.9%
2000	759	−1.2%
2010	771	+1.6%
2020	733	−4.9%
Source:"U.S. Census website". United States Census Bureau. and Iowa Data Center; Source: U.S. Decennial Census

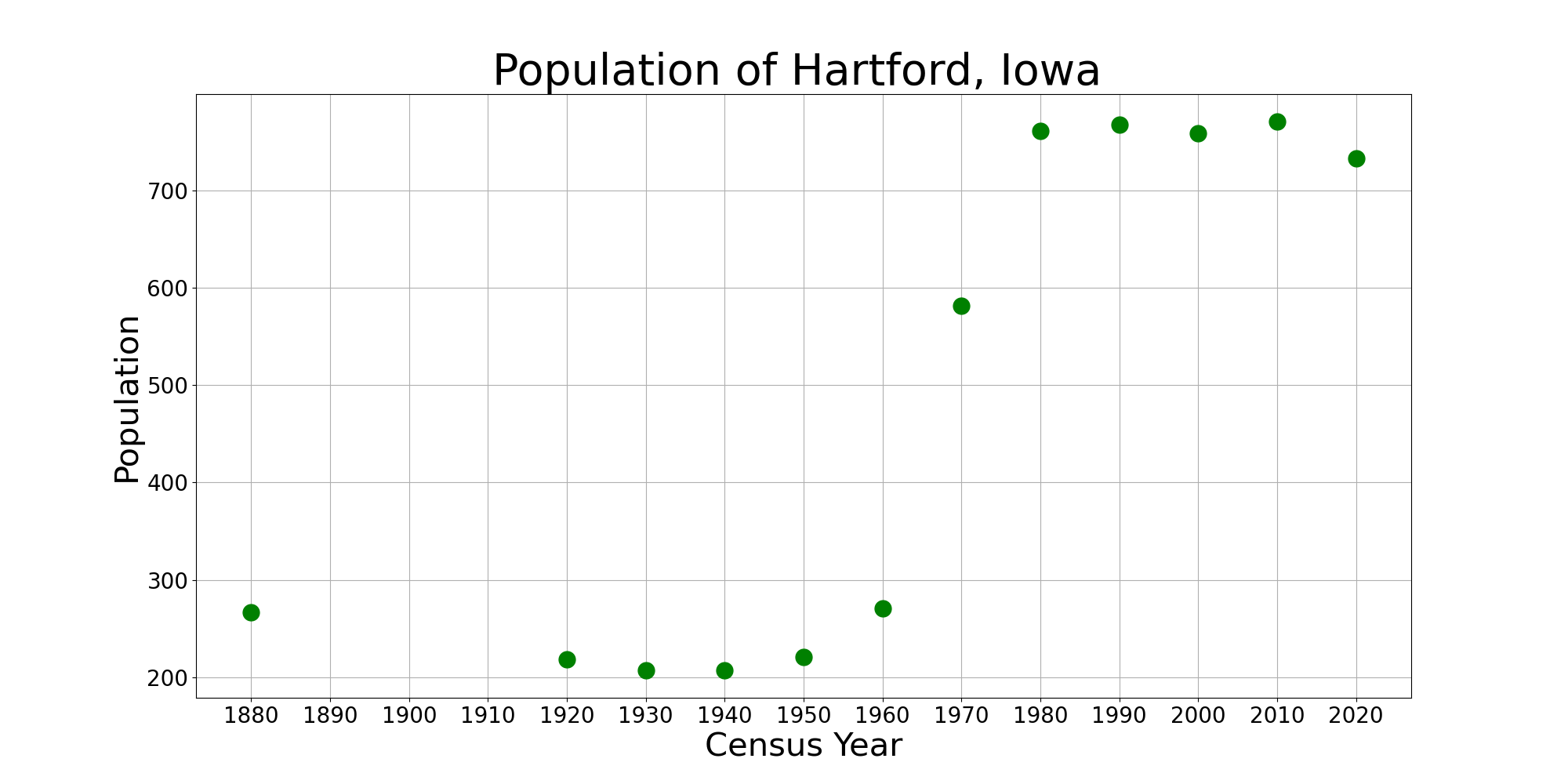
The population of Hartford, Iowa from US census data

=== 2020 census ===
As of the census of 2020, there were 733 people, 273 households, and 197 families residing in the city. The population density was 673.9 inhabitants per square mile (260.2/km^{2}). There were 294 housing units at an average density of 270.3 per square mile (104.4/km^{2}). The racial makeup of the city was 94.3% White, 0.4% Black or African American, 0.1% Native American, 0.4% Asian, 0.0% Pacific Islander, 1.6% from other races and 3.1% from two or more races. Hispanic or Latino persons of any race comprised 3.3% of the population.

Of the 273 households, 35.5% of which had children under the age of 18 living with them, 56.8% were married couples living together, 5.5% were cohabitating couples, 19.0% had a female householder with no spouse or partner present and 18.7% had a male householder with no spouse or partner present. 27.8% of all households were non-families. 24.9% of all households were made up of individuals, 11.0% had someone living alone who was 65 years old or older.

The median age in the city was 37.6 years. 30.7% of the residents were under the age of 20; 3.1% were between the ages of 20 and 24; 25.5% were from 25 and 44; 27.1% were from 45 and 64; and 13.5% were 65 years of age or older. The gender makeup of the city was 53.2% male and 46.8% female.

=== 2010 census ===
As of the census of 2010, there were 771 people, 279 households, and 208 families residing in the city. The population density was 748.5 inhabitants per square mile (289.0/km^{2}). There were 299 housing units at an average density of 290.3 per square mile (112.1/km^{2}). The racial makeup of the city was 97.4% White, 0.6% African American, 0.1% Native American, 0.5% Asian, 0.5% from other races, and 0.8% from two or more races. Hispanic or Latino of any race were 2.5% of the population.

There were 279 households, of which 41.2% had children under the age of 18 living with them, 56.3% were married couples living together, 11.8% had a female householder with no husband present, 6.5% had a male householder with no wife present, and 25.4% were non-families. 20.8% of all households were made up of individuals, and 9% had someone living alone who was 65 years of age or older. The average household size was 2.76 and the average family size was 3.19.

The median age in the city was 33.3 years. 30.6% of residents were under the age of 18; 6.8% were between the ages of 18 and 24; 28.7% were from 25 to 44; 24.7% were from 45 to 64; and 9.2% were 65 years of age or older. The gender makeup of the city was 51.2% male and 48.8% female.

=== 2000 census ===
As of the census of 2000, there were 759 people, 271 households, and 208 families residing in the city. The population density was 778.9 inhabitants per square mile (300.7/km^{2}). There were 282 housing units at an average density of 289.4 per square mile (111.7/km^{2}). The racial makeup of the city was 95.13% White, 1.98% Native American, 1.98% from other races, and 0.92% from two or more races. Hispanic or Latino of any race were 4.35% of the population.

There were 271 households, out of which 40.6% had children under the age of 18 living with them, 63.1% were married couples living together, 8.9% had a female householder with no husband present, and 23.2% were non-families. 20.3% of all households were made up of individuals, and 7.7% had someone living alone who was 65 years of age or older. The average household size was 2.80 and the average family size was 3.20.

In the city, the population was spread out, with 30.3% under the age of 18, 7.2% from 18 to 24, 30.2% from 25 to 44, 23.3% from 45 to 64, and 9.0% who were 65 years of age or older. The median age was 33 years. For every 100 females, there were 102.4 males. For every 100 females age 18 and over, there were 98.1 males.

The median income for a household in the city was $39,539, and the median income for a family was $45,125. Males had a median income of $31,726 versus $25,882 for females. The per capita income for the city was $18,141. About 2.4% of families and 4.7% of the population were below the poverty line, including 4.9% of those under age 18 and 3.5% of those age 65 or over.

== Education ==
Carlisle Community Schools operates public schools. One school, Hartford Upper Elementary School (grades 4–5), is in Hartford.
