= Pella Community School District =

Public school district in Pella, Iowa, United States

Coordinates: 41.400727°N 92.902950°W

Location
- Pella, Iowa Marion, Mahaska, and Jasper counties United States
- Coordinates: 41.400727, -92.902950

District information
- Type: Local school district
- Grades: PK-12
- Superintendent: Dr. Kyle Koeppen
- Schools: 6
- Budget: $37,061,000 (2020-21)
- NCES District ID: 1922470

Students and staff
- Students: 2,491 (2022-23)
- Teachers: 159.80 FTE
- Staff: 206.55 FTE
- Student–teacher ratio: 15.59
- Athletic conference: Little Hawkeye
- District mascot: Dutch
- Colors: Green and White

Other information
- Website: www.pellaschools.org

The Pella Community School District, or Pella Schools, is a rural public school district based in Pella, Iowa, and serves the town of Pella and surrounding areas in northeastern Marion and northwestern Mahaska counties, with a small area in southern Jasper County.

== Schools ==
The district operates six schools:

- Little Dutch Academy
- Lincoln Elementary School
- Madison Elementary School
- Jefferson Intermediate School
- Pella Middle School
- Pella High School

=== Pella High School ===
==== Athletics ====
The Pella Dutch compete in the Little Hawkeye Conference in the following sports:

- Cross Country (boys and girls)
  - Boys' (3-time Class 3A State Champions - 2009, 2011,2022)
  - Girls' (4-time State Champion- 2022, 2023, 2024, 2025)
- Volleyball (girls)
- Football (boys)
  - (3-time Class 3A State Champions - 2014, 2015, 2016)
- Basketball (boys and girls)
  - Boys' Basketball (3-time Class 3A State Champions - 2002, 2003, 2021)
- Bowling
- Wrestling (boys)
- Wrestling (girls)
- Swimming (boys and girls)
- Track and Field (boys and girls)
  - Boys' (5-time Class 3A State Champions - 1983, 2013, 2021, 2022, 2023)
- Golf (boys and girls)
  - Boys' (4-time State Champions - 1969, 1973, 2001, 2003)
  - Girls' 1994 Class 2A State Champions
- Tennis (boys and girls)
  - Girls' (Team State Champion- 2024)
- Soccer (boys and girls)
  - Boys' (Single Time State Champions - 2018)
- Baseball (boys)
  - 2025 Class 4A State Champions
- Softball (girls)
  - 2025 Class 4A State Champions

== See also ==
- List of school districts in Iowa
- List of high schools in Iowa
