= Franklin Township, Polk County, Iowa =

Township in Polk County, Iowa, U.S.

Coordinates: 41.733°N 93.406°W

Franklin Township is a township in Polk County, Iowa, United States.

== History ==
Franklin Township was organized in 1856.
