= Newton Community School District =

Public school district in Newton, Iowa, United States

Coordinates: 41.700052°N 93.070114°W

Location
- Newton, Iowa Jasper County United States
- Coordinates: 41.700052, -93.070114

District information
- Type: Local school district
- Grades: K-12
- Superintendent: Tom Messinger
- Schools: 7
- Budget: $45,625,000 (2020-21)
- NCES District ID: 1920610

Students and staff
- Students: 2857 (2022-23)
- Teachers: 203.18 FTE
- Staff: 215.20 FTE
- Student–teacher ratio: 14.06
- Athletic conference: Little Hawkeye
- District mascot: Cardinal
- Colors: Red and Black

Other information
- Website: www.newtoncsd.org

The Newton Community School District is a public school district based in Newton, Iowa, and serves the city of Newton and surrounding areas in Jasper County.

Tom Messinger was hired as superintendent is 2020, after previously serving as superintendent in Red Oak.

The school's mascot is the Cardinal. Their colors are red and black.

== Schools ==
The district operates seven schools:

- Aurora Heights Elementary School
- Emerson Hough Elementary School
- Thomas Jefferson Elementary School
- Woodrow Wilson Elementary School
- Berg Middle School
- Newton Senior High School
- West Academy Alternative High School

=== Newton High School ===
==== Athletics ====
The Newton Cardinals compete in the Little Hawkeye Conference in the following sports:

- Cross Country (boys and girls)
- Volleyball (girls)
- Football
  - (2-time State Champions - 1952, 1980)
- Basketball (boys and girls)
  - Boys' Basketball (3-time State Champions - 1926, 1963, 1964)
- Bowling
- Wrestling
- Swimming (boys and girls)
- Track and Field (boys and girls)
- Golf (boys and girls)
  - Boys' (2-time State Champions - 1990, 1994)
  - Coed (2-time State Champions - 1975, 1979)
- Tennis (boys and girls)
- Soccer (boys and girls)
- Baseball (boys)
- Softball (girls)

== Enrollment ==
View source data.

== See also ==
- List of school districts in Iowa
- List of high schools in Iowa
