= Gilbert, Iowa =

- City
- Location of Gilbert, Iowa
- Coordinates: 42°06′22″N 93°38′46″W
- Country: United States
- State: Iowa
- County: Story

Government
  - Mayor: Jon Popp

Area
  - Total: 1.10 sq mi (2.85 km^{2})
  - Land: 1.10 sq mi (2.85 km^{2})
  - Water: 0 sq mi (0.00 km^{2})
- Elevation: 981 ft (299 m)

Population (2020)
  - Total: 1,211
  - Density: 1,100.0/sq mi (424.72/km^{2})
- Time zone: UTC-6 (Central (CST))
  - Summer (DST): UTC-5 (CDT)
- ZIP code: 50105
- Area code: 515
- FIPS code: 19-30630
- GNIS feature ID: 2394894
- Website: Official website

Gilbert is a city in Story County, Iowa, United States. The population was 1,211 at the time of the 2020 census. It is part of the Ames, Iowa Metropolitan Statistical Area, which is a part of the larger Ames-Boone, Iowa Combined Statistical Area.

== History ==
Gilbert was named for Hezekiah Gilbert, who owned the land upon which the town was built.

== Geography ==
According to the United States Census Bureau, the city has a total area of 9.1 square miles (23.57 km^{2}), all land.

== Demographics ==
Historical populations
Year	Pop.	±%
1910	235	—
1920	221	−6.0%
1930	221	+0.0%
1940	226	+2.3%
1950	297	+31.4%
1960	318	+7.1%
1970	521	+63.8%
1980	805	+54.5%
1990	796	−1.1%
2000	987	+24.0%
2010	1,082	+9.6%
2020	1,211	+11.9%
Source:"U.S. Census website". United States Census Bureau. and Iowa Data Center; Source: U.S. Decennial Census

=== 2020 census ===
As of the 2020 census, Gilbert had a population of 1,211 people, with 440 households and 362 families residing in the city. The population density was 1,100.0 inhabitants per square mile (424.7/km^{2}), and there were 451 housing units at an average density of 409.7 per square mile (158.2/km^{2}). The median age was 36.8 years. 30.0% of residents were under the age of 18 and 9.2% were 65 years of age or older; 32.4% of residents were under the age of 20, 4.0% were between 20 and 24, 27.8% were from 25 to 44, and 26.5% were from 45 to 64. For every 100 females there were 106.7 males, and for every 100 females age 18 and over there were 96.8 males age 18 and over; the gender makeup of the city was 51.6% male and 48.4% female.

Of the 440 households, 46.1% had children under the age of 18 living with them, 70.0% were married-couple households, 3.6% were cohabitating couples, 16.4% had a female householder with no spouse or partner present, and 10.0% had a male householder with no spouse or partner present. 17.7% of households were non-families. 15.5% of all households were made up of individuals, and 3.6% had someone living alone who was 65 years of age or older.

There were 451 housing units, of which 2.4% were vacant. The homeowner vacancy rate was 1.9% and the rental vacancy rate was 2.5%. 0.0% of residents lived in urban areas, while 100.0% lived in rural areas.

Racial composition as of the 2020 census
Race	Number	Percent
White	1,102	91.0%
Black or African American	17	1.4%
American Indian and Alaska Native	4	0.3%
Asian	8	0.7%
Native Hawaiian and Other Pacific Islander	0	0.0%
Some other race	15	1.2%
Two or more races	65	5.4%
Hispanic or Latino (of any race)	35	2.9%

=== 2010 census ===
As of the census of 2010, there were 1,082 people, 382 households, and 303 families residing in the city. The population density was 1,189.0 inhabitants per square mile (459.1/km^{2}). There were 390 housing units at an average density of 428.6 per square mile (165.5/km^{2}). The racial makeup of the city was 95.3% White, 1.4% African American, 0.2% Native American, 1.1% Asian, 0.8% from other races, and 1.2% from two or more races. Hispanic or Latino of any race were 1.5% of the population.

There were 382 households, of which 49.5% had children under the age of 18 living with them, 67.5% were married couples living together, 9.4% had a female householder with no husband present, 2.4% had a male householder with no wife present, and 20.7% were non-families. 17.3% of all households were made up of individuals, and 4.2% had someone living alone who was 65 years of age or older. The average household size was 2.83 and the average family size was 3.22.

The median age in the city was 34.2 years. 32.4% of residents were under the age of 18; 5.8% were between the ages of 18 and 24; 29.1% were from 25 to 44; 26.2% were from 45 to 64; and 6.4% were 65 years of age or older. The gender makeup of the city was 49.1% male and 50.9% female.

=== 2000 census ===
As of the census of 2000, there were 987 people, 337 households, and 268 families residing in the city. The population density was 1,195.6 inhabitants per square mile (461.6/km^{2}). There were 347 housing units at an average density of 420.3 per square mile (162.3/km^{2}). The racial makeup of the city was 97.06% White, 0.71% African American, 1.52% Asian, 0.20% from other races, and 0.51% from two or more races. Hispanic or Latino of any race were 1.11% of the population.

There were 337 households, out of which 48.1% had children under the age of 18 living with them, 72.7% were married couples living together, 4.7% had a single female head of household, and 20.2% were non-families. 16.0% of all households were made up of individuals, and 4.5% had someone living alone who was 65 years of age or older. The average household size was 2.93 and the average family size was 3.30.

32.1% are under the age of 18, 8.9% from 18 to 24, 33.5% from 25 to 44, 19.0% from 45 to 64, and 6.4% who were 65 years of age or older. The median age was 32 years. For every 100 females, there were 103.1 males. For every 100 females age 18 and over, there were 101.2 males.

The median income for a household in the city was $56,406, and the median income for a family was $61,184. Males had a median income of $35,313 versus $25,083 for females. The per capita income for the city was $19,741. About 1.1% of families and 2.4% of the population were below the poverty line, including 1.3% of those under age 18 and 2.9% of those age 65 or over.

== Parks and recreation ==
The prominent parks are Lions Park, Banford Park, and Upstill Park. There is a walking trail along Upstill Park near the elementary. Upstill park has soccer fields, baseball and softball diamonds. There is a museum on main street and two community centers in town. There are also many county parks in the surrounding communities of Story City and Ames. Ada Haden Lake lies to the South in Ames.

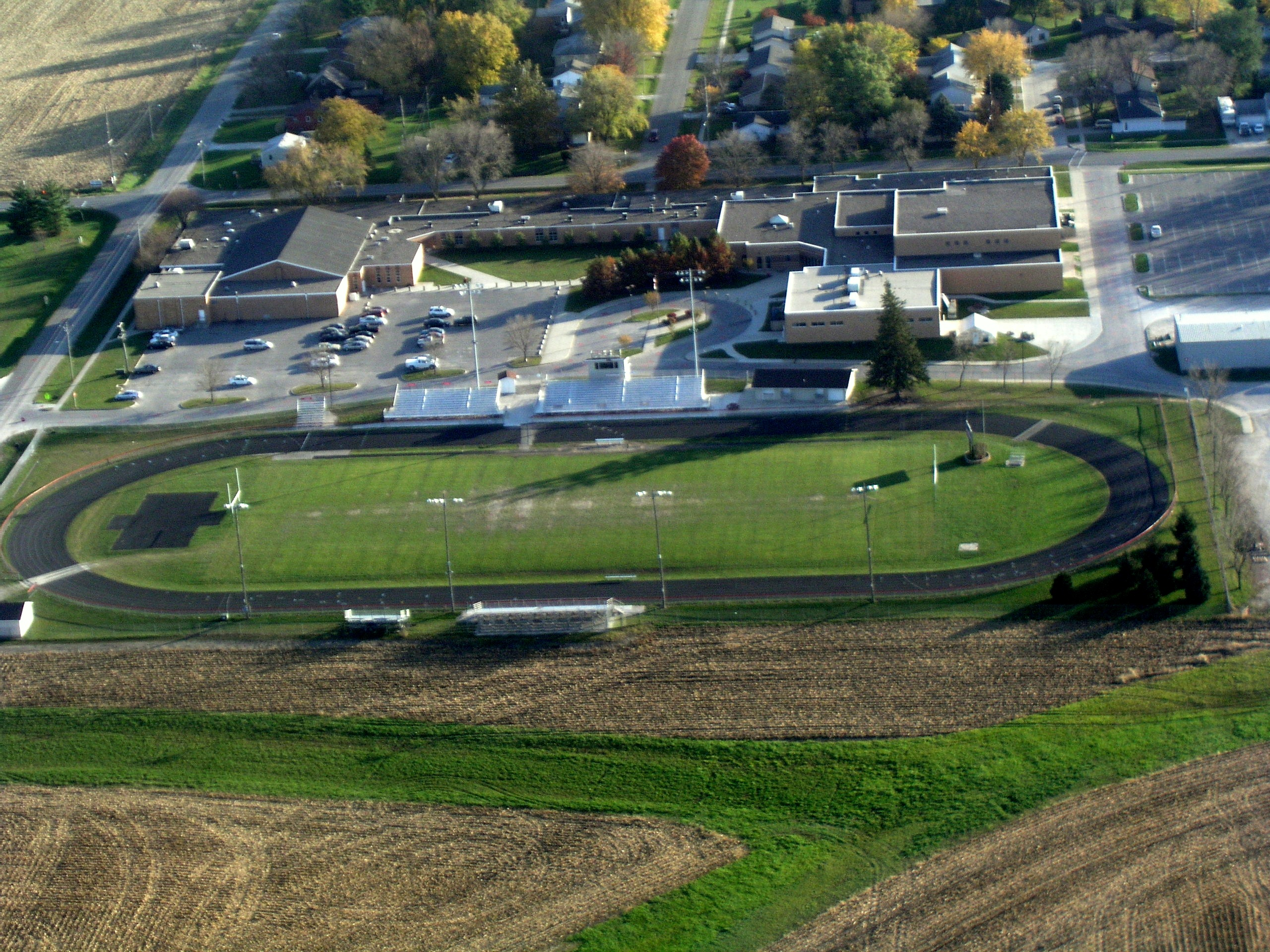
Gilbert Intermediate School

== Education ==
The Gilbert area is served by Gilbert Community School District. Schools include: Gilbert Elementary, Gilbert Intermediate School, Gilbert Middle School, and Gilbert High School

== Infrastructure ==
The main east–west road through Gilbert is county highway E23. Highway 69 runs north to south. Gilbert lies between Ames and Story City on highway 69. A Union Pacific rail line goes north and south through the city, crossing Mathews Drive.

== Notable people ==
- Jerry McNertney - (born August 7, 1936) played in MLB as a catcher in 1964 and 1966-1973.
- Christian Petersen - (1885–1961) sculptor and university teacher
