= Brandon Myers =

American football player (born 1985)

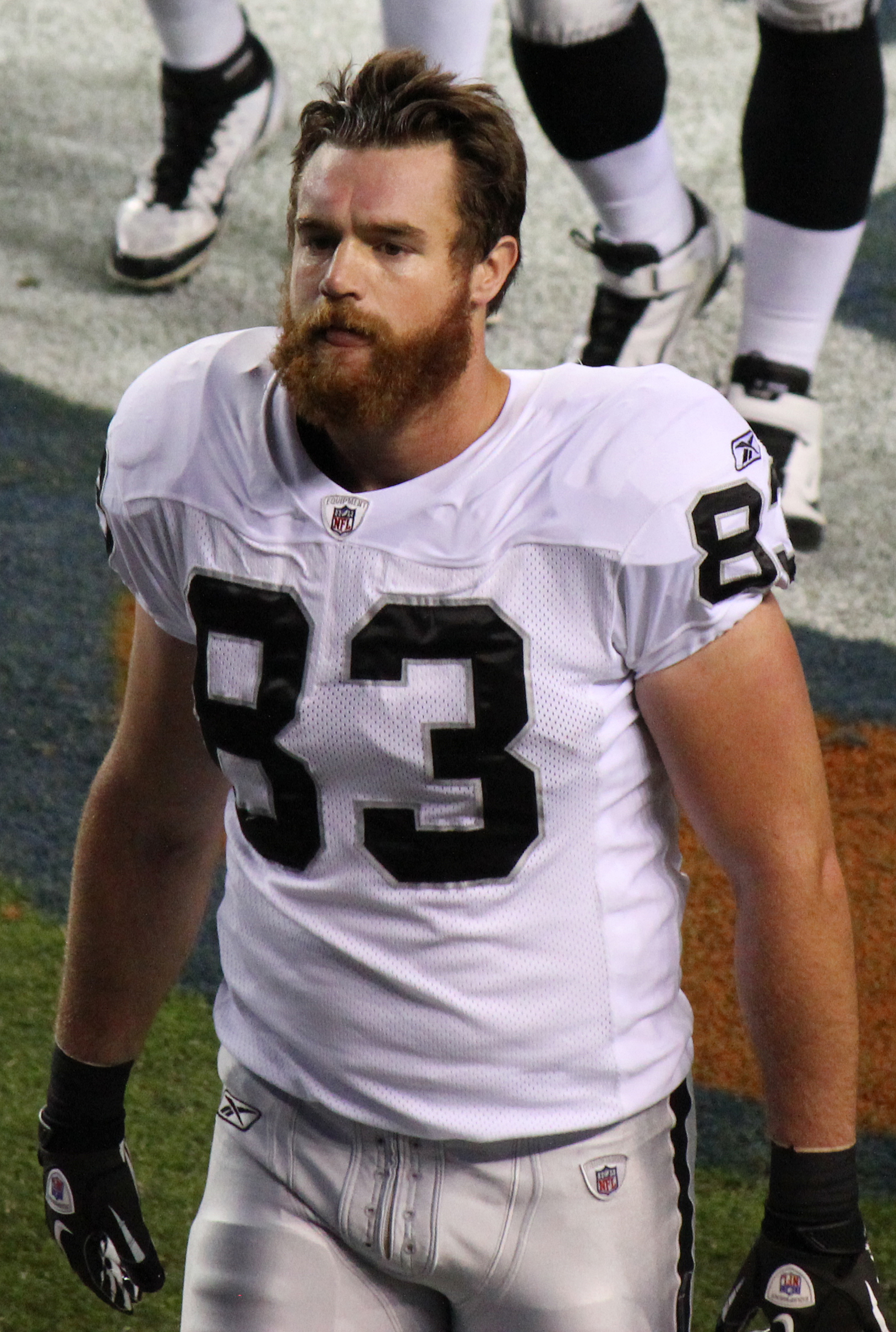
- Myers with the Oakland Raiders in 2011

No. 82, 83
- Position: Tight end

Personal information
- Born: September 4, 1985 (age 41); Prairie City, Iowa, U.S.
- Listed height: 6 ft 3 in (1.91 m)
- Listed weight: 256 lb (116 kg)

Career information
- High school: Prairie City-Monroe (Monroe, Iowa)
- College: Iowa (2004–2008)
- NFL draft: 2009: 6th round, 202nd overall pick

Career history
- Oakland Raiders (2009–2012); New York Giants (2013); Tampa Bay Buccaneers (2014–2016)

Awards and highlights
- First-team All-Big Ten (2008)

Career NFL statistics
- Receptions: 199
- Receiving yards: 1,954
- Receiving touchdowns: 9
- Stats at Pro Football Reference

Brandon Myers (born September 4, 1985) is an American former professional football player who was a tight end in the National Football League (NFL). He played college football for the Iowa Hawkeyes and was selected by the Oakland Raiders in the sixth round of the 2009 NFL draft.

Myers also played for the New York Giants and Tampa Bay Buccaneers.

== College career ==
Myers played college football for the Iowa Hawkeyes where he totaled 56 receptions for 665 yards and 9 touchdowns in four years. He was named first-team All-Big Ten by conference coaches during his senior season, when he ranked third on the team in receptions (34) and yards (441), and tied for Hawkeyes lead with four touchdown receptions.

== Professional career ==
=== Oakland Raiders ===
Myers was selected by the Oakland Raiders in the sixth round with the 202nd overall pick in the 2009 NFL draft. In a game against the Cleveland Browns, on December 2, 2012 Myers tied a Raiders franchise record by recording his 14th reception of the game. He caught for 130 yards and 1 touchdown in the game.

=== New York Giants ===
Myers was signed by the New York Giants on March 16, 2013. He was given a one-year deal worth $2.25 million with a $1.5 million signing bonus. He was released from the Giants after one season.

=== Tampa Bay Buccaneers ===
On March 11, 2014, Myers signed a two-year, $4 million contract with the Tampa Bay Buccaneers.

== NFL career statistics ==
Legend
**Bold**	Career high

Year	Team	Games		Receiving					
Year	Team	GP	GS	Tgt	Rec	Yds	Avg	Lng	TD
2009	OAK	11	2	6	4	19	4.8	6	0
2010	OAK	15	3	16	12	80	6.7	16	0
2011	OAK	**16**	7	27	16	151	9.4	24	0
2012	OAK	**16**	**16**	**105**	**79**	**806**	10.2	**29**	**4**
2013	NYG	**16**	14	76	47	522	**11.1**	27	**4**
2014	TAM	14	6	32	22	190	8.6	26	0
2015	TAM	11	6	17	12	127	10.6	17	0
2016	TAM	**16**	9	14	7	59	8.4	12	1
Career		115	63	293	199	1,954	9.8	29	9
