= Grimes, Iowa =

- City
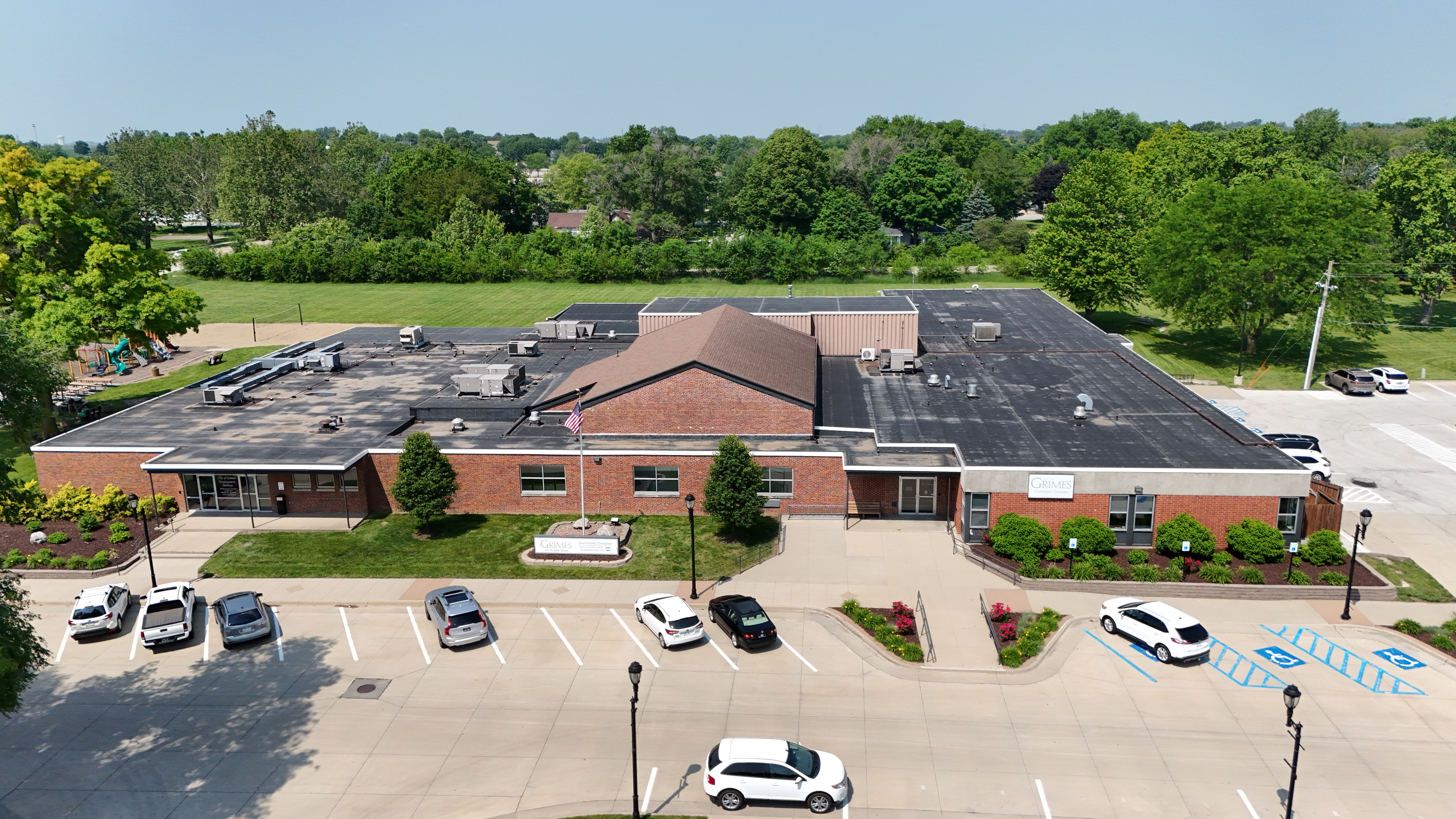
- Grimes Community Complex
- Motto: "Your hometown. Your lifestyle."
- Location of Grimes, Iowa
- Coordinates: 41°40′42″N 93°47′42″W
- Country: United States
- State: Iowa
- Counties: Polk, Dallas
- Townships: Webster, Jefferson, Walnut, Grant
- Established: 1881
- Incorporated: May 7, 1894
- Named after: James W. Grimes

Area
  - Total: 12.01 sq mi (31.11 km^{2})
  - Land: 12.00 sq mi (31.07 km^{2})
  - Water: 0.019 sq mi (0.05 km^{2})
- Elevation: 978 ft (298 m)

Population (2020)
  - Total: 15,392
  - Density: 1,283.2/sq mi (495.46/km^{2})
- Time zone: UTC-6 (Central (CST))
  - Summer (DST): UTC-5 (CDT)
- ZIP code: 50111
- Area code: 515
- FIPS code: 19-33060
- GNIS feature ID: 2394252
- Website: www.grimesiowa.gov

Grimes is a city in Polk and Dallas counties in the U.S. state of Iowa. The population was 15,392 at the time of the 2020 Census. Grimes is part of the Des Moines-West Des Moines metropolitan area.

== History ==
Grimes was founded in 1881 and became incorporated as a city on May 7, 1894. It is named after James W. Grimes, a former U.S. senator and the third governor of Iowa.

== Geography ==
According to the United States Census Bureau, the city has a total area of 11.87 square miles (30.74 km^{2}), of which 11.84 square miles (30.67 km^{2}) is land and 0.03 square miles (0.08 km^{2}) is water.

=== Climate ===
Climate data for Grimes, Iowa
Month	Jan	Feb	Mar	Apr	May	Jun	Jul	Aug	Sep	Oct	Nov	Dec	Year
Record high °F (°C)	67 (19)	69 (21)	90 (32)	93 (34)	99 (37)	102 (39)	105 (41)	106 (41)	99 (37)	94 (34)	83 (28)	70 (21)	106 (41)
Mean daily maximum °F (°C)	31 (−1)	36 (2)	48 (9)	62 (17)	73 (23)	82 (28)	87 (31)	85 (29)	77 (25)	64 (18)	48 (9)	34 (1)	61 (16)
Daily mean °F (°C)	21 (−6)	26 (−3)	37 (3)	50 (10)	62 (17)	71 (22)	76 (24)	73 (23)	65 (18)	52 (11)	38 (3)	25 (−4)	50 (10)
Mean daily minimum °F (°C)	11 (−12)	15 (−9)	26 (−3)	38 (3)	50 (10)	60 (16)	64 (18)	61 (16)	52 (11)	39 (4)	28 (−2)	15 (−9)	38 (4)
Record low °F (°C)	−28 (−33)	−34 (−37)	−23 (−31)	8 (−13)	26 (−3)	40 (4)	43 (6)	35 (2)	22 (−6)	12 (−11)	−9 (−23)	−25 (−32)	−34 (−37)
Average precipitation inches (mm)	0.9 (23)	1.0 (25)	2.2 (56)	3.7 (94)	4.9 (120)	5.1 (130)	5.1 (130)	4.4 (110)	3.1 (79)	2.5 (64)	2.0 (51)	1.2 (30)	36.1 (912)
Source: weather.com

== Demographics ==
Historical populations
Year	Pop.	±%
1900	186	—
1910	733	+294.1%
1920	524	−28.5%
1930	468	−10.7%
1940	489	+4.5%
1950	582	+19.0%
1960	697	+19.8%
1970	834	+19.7%
1980	1,973	+136.6%
1990	2,653	+34.5%
2000	5,098	+92.2%
2010	8,246	+61.7%
2020	15,392	+86.7%
Source:"U.S. Census website". United States Census Bureau. and Iowa Data Center; Source: U.S. Decennial Census

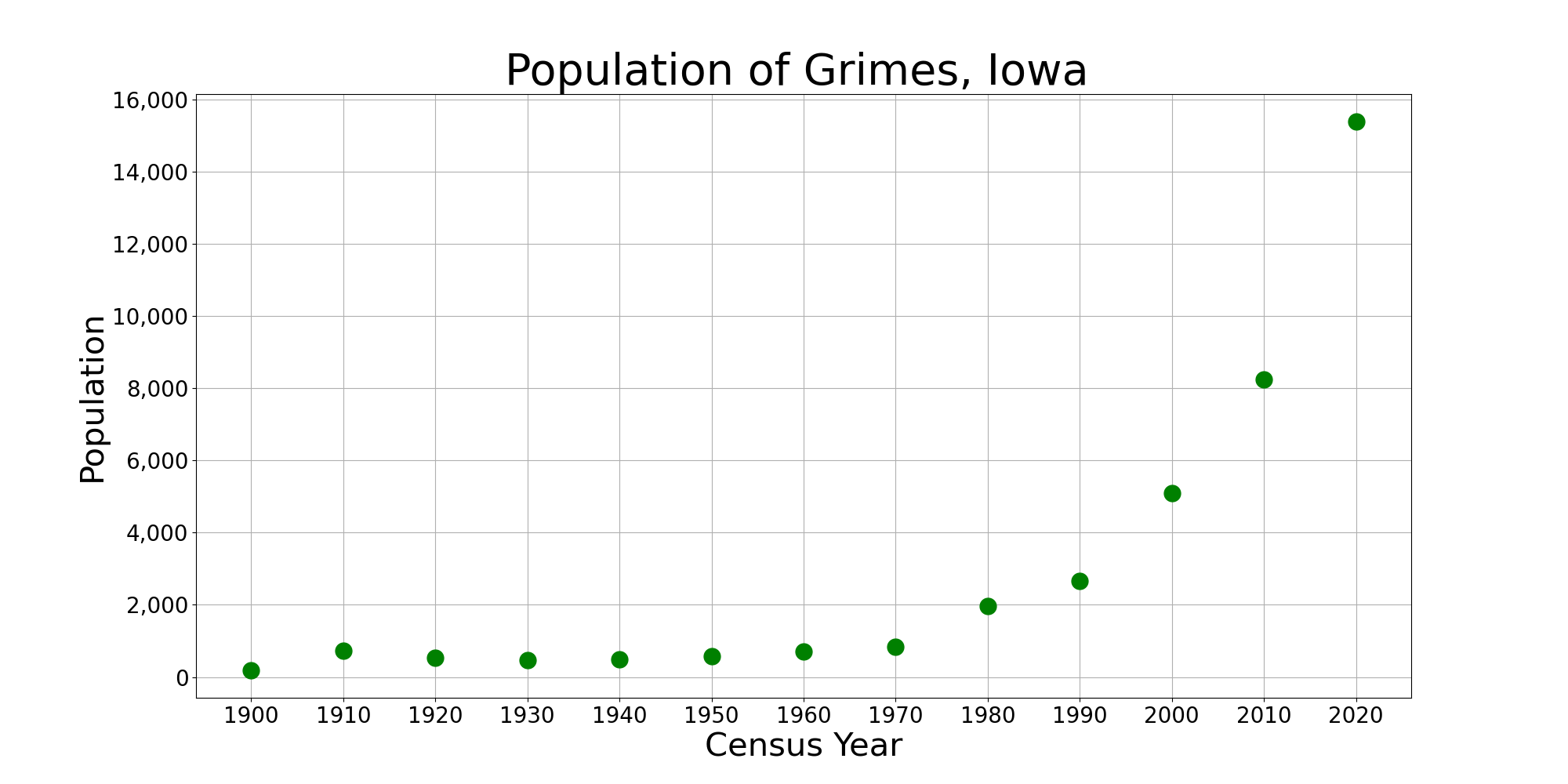
The population of Grimes, Iowa from US census data

=== 2020 census ===
As of the 2020 census, there were 15,392 people, 5,708 households, and 4,086 families residing in the city. The population density was 1,300.8 inhabitants per square mile (502.3/km^{2}). There were 6,062 housing units at an average density of 512.3 per square mile (197.8/km^{2}).

The median age was 33.6 years. Age distribution was 32.4% under the age of 20, 5.1% from 20 to 24, 32.3% from 25 to 44, 21.4% from 45 to 64, and 8.8% age 65 or older; 30.2% of residents were under age 18. For every 100 females, there were 93.8 males, and for every 100 females age 18 and over, there were 91.2 males age 18 and over.

There were 5,708 households, of which 43.3% had children under the age of 18 living in them. Of all households, 56.4% were married-couple households, 6.9% were cohabitating-couple households, 14.1% were households with a male householder and no spouse or partner present, and 22.5% were households with a female householder and no spouse or partner present. About 28.4% were non-family households, 22.5% were made up of individuals, and 6.5% had someone living alone who was 65 years of age or older.

There were 6,062 housing units, of which 5.8% were vacant. The homeowner vacancy rate was 2.4% and the rental vacancy rate was 9.9%.

99.8% of residents lived in urban areas, while 0.2% lived in rural areas.

Racial composition as of the 2020 census
Race	Number	Percent
White	13,557	88.1%
Black or African American	444	2.9%
American Indian and Alaska Native	41	0.3%
Asian	365	2.4%
Native Hawaiian and Other Pacific Islander	8	0.1%
Some other race	231	1.5%
Two or more races	746	4.8%
Hispanic or Latino (of any race)	684	4.4%

=== 2010 census ===
As of the census of 2010, there were 8,246 people, 3,115 households, and 2,222 families living in the city. The population density was 696.5 inhabitants per square mile (268.9/km^{2}). There were 3,272 housing units at an average density of 276.4 per square mile (106.7/km^{2}). The racial makeup of the city was 95.0% White, 1.1% African American, 0.2% Native American, 1.7% Asian, 0.8% from other races, and 1.3% from two or more races. Hispanic or Latino of any race were 2.5% of the population.

There were 3,115 households, of which 44.1% had children under the age of 18 living with them, 58.7% were married couples living together, 9.2% had a female householder with no husband present, 3.4% had a male householder with no wife present, and 28.7% were non-families. 21.7% of all households were made up of individuals, and 4.5% had someone living alone who was 65 years of age or older. The average household size was 2.65 and the average family size was 3.15.

The median age in the city was 31.1 years. 31.2% of residents were under the age of 18; 6% were between the ages of 18 and 24; 36.7% were from 25 to 44; 20.4% were from 45 to 64; and 5.7% were 65 years of age or older. The gender makeup of the city was 49.3% male and 50.7% female.

=== 2000 census ===
As of the census of 2000, there were 5,098 people, 1,887 households, and 1,437 families living in the city. The population density was 569.4 inhabitants per square mile (219.8/km^{2}). There were 1,958 housing units at an average density of 218.7 per square mile (84.4/km^{2}). The racial makeup of the city was 97.19% White, 0.33% African American, 0.22% Native American, 0.88% Asian, 0.27% from other races, and 1.10% from two or more races. Hispanic or Latino of any race were 1.08% of the population. 2005 population estimate was 6,175 (Des Moines Register, July 12, 2006).

There were 1,887 households, out of which 47.3% had children under the age of 18 living with them, 61.7% were married couples living together, 11.1% had a female householder with no husband present, and 23.8% were non-families. 19.6% of all households were made up of individuals, and 5.0% had someone living alone who was 65 years of age or older. The average household size was 2.70 and the average family size was 3.13.

32.7% are under the age of 18, 7.1% from 18 to 24, 39.2% from 25 to 44, 15.6% from 45 to 64, and 5.5% who were 65 years of age or older. The median age was 31 years. For every 100 females, there were 94.7 males. For every 100 females age 18 and over, there were 88.1 males.

The median income for a household in the city was $56,275, and the median income for a family was $60,847. Males had a median income of $40,118 versus $31,588 for females. The per capita income for the city was $23,712. About 2.4% of families and 3.3% of the population were below the poverty line, including 2.7% of those under age 18 and 7.7% of those age 65 or over.

== Economy ==
Japanese animation distributor and online retailer The Right Stuf International was headquartered in Grimes. The company occupied a 76,000-square-foot (7,100 m^{2}) office and distribution center.

== Parks and recreation ==
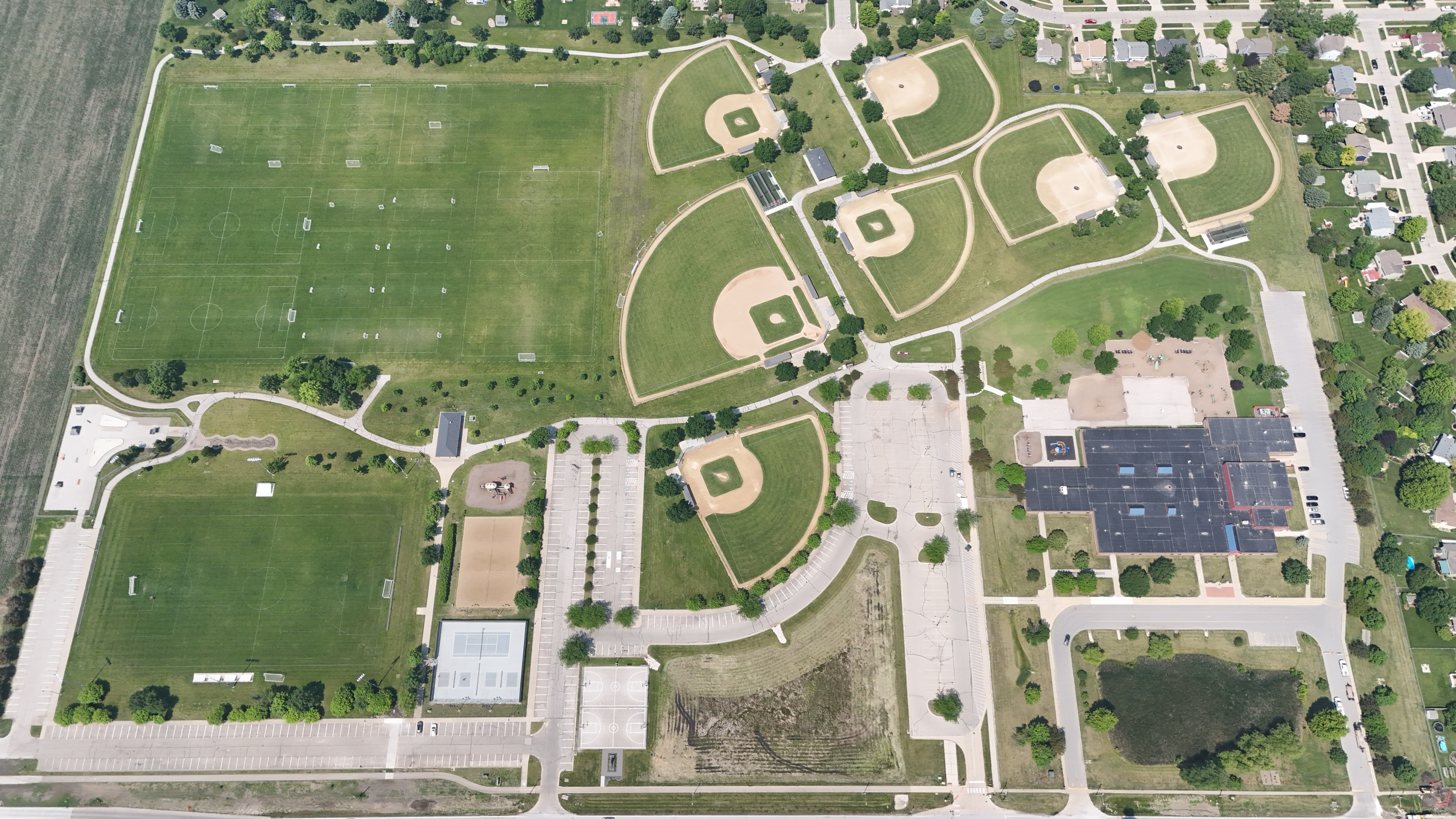
Grimes South Sports Complex

Grimes has several parks. The main park is Water Works Park, which also has a splash pad for kids to play in during the summer. Parks in Grimes include: The South Sports Complex, The North Sports Complex, Autumn Park, Beaverbrooke Park, Shawver Park, North Pointe Park, Glenstone Park, Kennybrook South Park, Heritage Park, and Lions Park.

== Government ==
Grimes' city council meets the second and fourth Tuesday of the month. The mayor is Scott Mikkelsen.

== Education ==
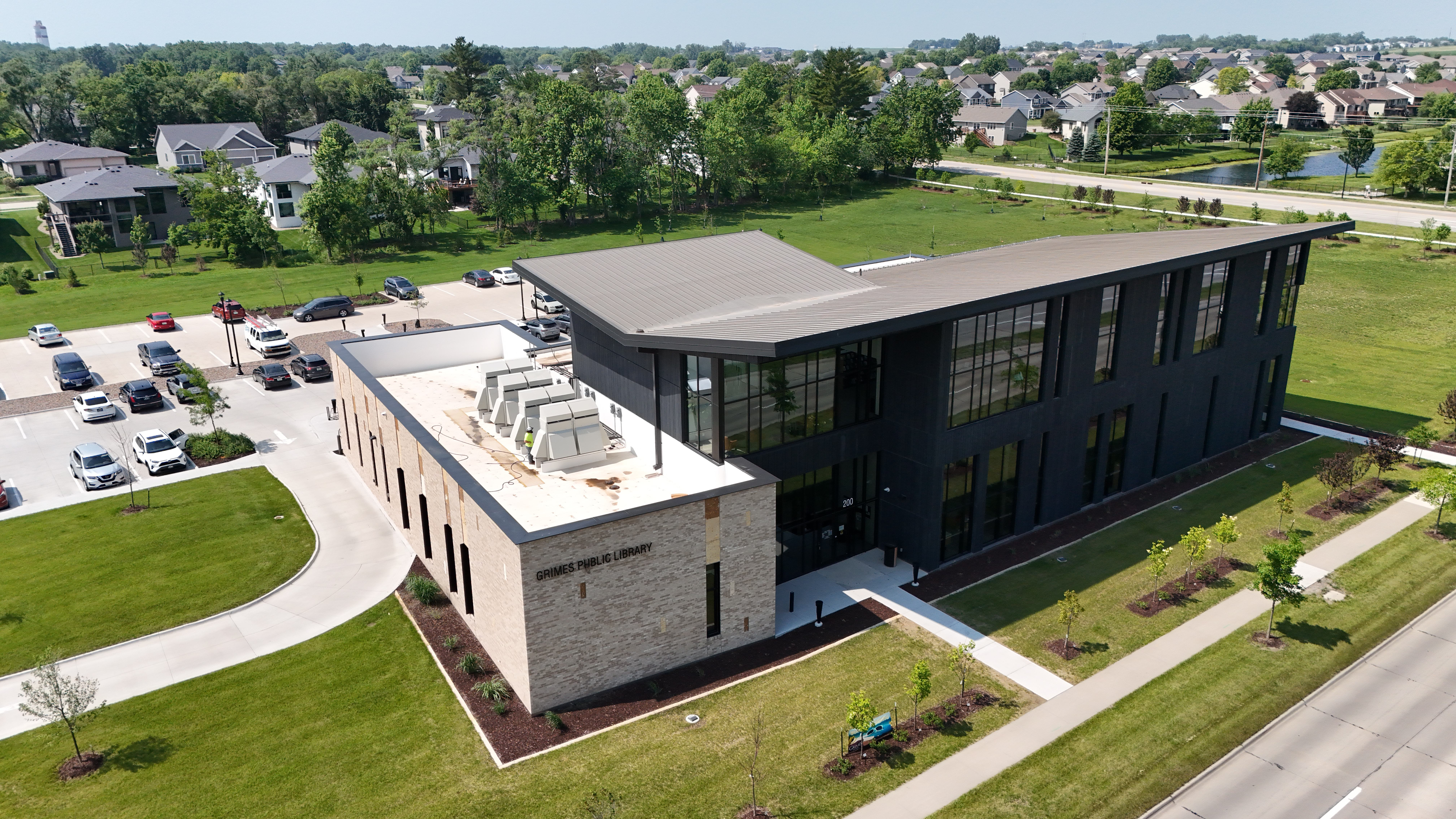
Grimes public library

Grimes, along with Dallas Center, forms the Dallas Center–Grimes Community School District system which draws students from both Polk and Dallas County. The high school (grades 9-12) and The DC-G Administration Building form a campus located inside Grimes, a middle school (grades 5-6) in Dallas Center, and Oak View a middle school (grades 7-8) in Grimes. The district also has 4 elementary schools, South Prairie Elementary (grades K-4), North Ridge Elementary (grades OK-4), and Heritage Elementary (grades K-4), which are all in Grimes, along with Dallas Center Elementary (grades K-4), which resides in Dallas Center. The school mascot is the Mustangs and the colors are red and white.

Portions of the community of Grimes are also served by the Johnston Community School District. Primarily, areas within the Johnston district, but within the official Grimes city limits are those areas on the east side of Iowa Highway 141.

== Transportation ==
In Grimes, there are many different ways to get around the city. This includes the US, state, and county highways of both Dallas and Polk county, Iowa. In Grimes, Iowa 141 passes through the central half of the city. Iowa 44 passes along the well known 1st Street.

Transit in the city is provided by Heart of Iowa Regional Transit Authority. Buses with this service give riders a chance to go around the metro and into other areas.

== Notable people ==
- Brandon Fricke, soccer player
- Brett Moffitt, NASCAR driver
- Inez Scott Ryberg, academic and archeologist
- Tony Watson, MLB pitcher
