= Quinn Sypniewski =

American football player (born 1982)

No. 88
- Position: Tight end

Personal information
- Born: April 14, 1982 (age 44); Granger, Iowa, U.S.
- Listed height: 6 ft 6 in (1.98 m)
- Listed weight: 270 lb (122 kg)

Career information
- High school: Johnston (Johnston, Iowa)
- College: Colorado
- NFL draft: 2006: 5th round, 166th overall pick

Career history
- Baltimore Ravens (2006–2009)

Career NFL statistics
- Receptions: 36
- Receiving yards: 261
- Receiving touchdowns: 1
- Stats at Pro Football Reference

Quinn Brian Sypniewski (sip-NEW-ski; born April 14, 1982) is an American former professional football player who was a tight end in the National Football League (NFL). He played college football for the Colorado Buffaloes and was selected by the Baltimore Ravens in the fifth round of the 2006 NFL draft.

== College career ==
After attending Johnston High School in Johnston, Iowa, Sypniewski played college football at the University of Colorado Boulder. He appeared in 55 games, a Buffaloes career record. He graduated in May 2005 with dual degrees in journalism and history.

== Professional career ==
Pre-draft measurables
| Height | Weight | Arm length | Hand span | 40-yard dash | 10-yard split | 20-yard split | 20-yard shuttle | Three-cone drill | Vertical jump | Broad jump | Bench press |
|---|---|---|---|---|---|---|---|---|---|---|---|
| 6 ft 6 1/2 in (1.99 m) | 268 lb (122 kg) | 32 3/4 in (0.83 m) | 9 1/4 in (0.23 m) | 4.81 s | 1.64 s | 2.78 s | 4.52 s | 7.09 s | 32.5 in (0.83 m) | 9 ft 6 in (2.90 m) | 20 reps |
All values from NFL Combine

He was signed to a three-year contract after being selected by the Ravens in the fifth round (166th overall) in the 2006 NFL draft. In his rookie season, Sypniewski saw action in all 16 games, primarily as a blocker. He finished the year with two catches for 15 yards.

Due to injuries to Todd Heap and Daniel Wilcox, Sypniewski saw more action early in the 2007 season, with six receptions against the Cleveland Browns on September 30, and more against San Francisco on October 7. He finished the season with 34 receptions for 246 yards and one touchdown.

On April 19, 2008, Sypniewski tore his ACL and suffered minor damage to other ligaments during an offseason workout. The injury occurred when he bumped into teammate Antwan Barnes, causing him to plant his leg awkwardly on the floor. After having surgery, he was placed on season-ending injured reserve on July 18.

Sypniewski was waived after the 2008 season, after failing to pass a physical.

== Personal life ==
Sypniewski is married the former Mia Whiting in July 2006. The couple has a daughter, Keira, and a son, Kolt. Sypniewski's father, George Sypniewski died on January 29, 2019, after a two and a half month battle with Acute Myeloid Leukemia, with his family by his side
