= Heart of Iowa Conference =

High school athletic conference in Iowa

- Conference: IHSAA / IGHSAU
- Founded: 1966
- Sports fielded: 13
- No. of teams: 9
- Region: Central Iowa
- Website: www.heartofiowaconference.org

The Heart of Iowa Conference is a high school athletic conference in central Iowa that dates back to the 1970s. Members are a mixture between 3A and 2A, the second- and third-largest classes.

== Current members ==
Institution	Location	Mascot	Colors	Affiliation	2026-2027 BEDS
Grand View Christian	Des Moines	Thunder		Private	224
Greene County	Jefferson	Rams		Public	263
Nevada	Nevada	Cubs		Public	340
Perry	Perry	Bluejays		Public	410
PCM	Monroe	Mustangs		Public	250
Roland–Story	Story City	Norsemen		Public	249
Saydel	Des Moines	Eagles		Public	305
South Hamilton	Jewell	Hawks		Public	146
West Marshall	State Center	Trojans		Public	201
Woodward-Granger	Woodward	Hawks		Public	204

== History ==
The conference was formed in 1966 by Ballard, Nevada, South Hamilton, Perry Community School and West Marshall after the disbanding of the Hawkeye Central Conference.

In 1967, Carlisle, Johnston and North Polk joined, and in 1970, Roland–Story joined from the West Central Conference.

As of 1992, the league had 10 schools in it. Bondurant–Farrar, Collins–Maxwell–Baxter, Colo–NESCO, Gilbert, Madrid, Ogden, and Woodward-Granger had joined, while Carlisle, Johnston, Nevada, and North Polk had departed.

Colfax–Mingo and Pleasantville were added to the conference in 1997, following the demise of the Des Moines River Conference. Pleasantville then left the league in 2001, and North Polk rejoined. In 2006, Prairie City-Monroe joined the league from the South Central Conference. In 2007, Madrid left for the West Central Conference and was replaced by former Raccoon River Conference member Jefferson-Scranton. In 2008, West Marshall left for the NICL. The 2009 season saw Woodward-Granger jump to the West Central Conference and Nevada re-joined the league from the Raccoon River Conference. In the 2010 season, Colo–NESCO jumped to Iowa Star Conference in every sport except sharing with CMB in soccer. Ogden left the conference in 2011, in order to join former conference foes Woodward-Granger and Madrid in the West Central Conference. Bondurant-Farrar made the jump to Raccoon River Conference starting in the 2011–12 school year. Grandview Park Baptist left the Heart of Iowa Conference before the softball season to go to Rolling Hills Conference. Saydel joined the conference beginning in the fall of the 2012–13 school year. In 2015, Colfax–Mingo left for the South Iowa Cedar League.

In 2017–18 season, Collins-Maxwell & Baxter split up their sharing agreement and both schools went to the Iowa Star Conference.

In 2018, both Gilbert and North Polk agreed to leave the conference for the Raccoon River Conference in the 2020–21 school year.

In 2021, Perry left the Raccoon River Conference to become the 8th member of the Heart of Iowa Conference. In 2023, Grand View Christian was admitted to the conference for the 2024-25 school year, despite being voted down by conference members in 2020, after a successful appeal to the Iowa Board of Education.

In March 2024, the conference extended an official invitation to Boone, which would be effective for the 2025-26 school year.

On May 20, 2025, Woodward-Granger announced that they had officially voted during the May 19, 2025, regular board meeting to apply to join the Heart of Iowa Conference beginning July 1, 2026. It was reported that this application was unanimously approved by the conference in June 2025.
