= PCM Community School District =

Public school district in Monroe, Iowa, United States

Coordinates: 41.515284°N 93.097836°W

Location
- Monroe, Iowa Jasper, Marion, and Polk counties United States
- Coordinates: 41.515284, -93.097836

District information
- Type: Local school district
- Grades: K-12
- Established: 1991
- Superintendent: Michelle Havenstrite
- Schools: 4
- Budget: $16,571,000 (2020-21)
- NCES District ID: 1999017

Students and staff
- Students: 1130 (2022-23)
- Teachers: 82.99 FTE
- Staff: 90.35 FTE
- Student–teacher ratio: 13.62
- Athletic conference: Heart of Iowa
- District mascot: Mustangs
- Colors: Maroon and Gold

Other information
- Website: www.pcmschools.org

PCM (Prairie City Monroe) Community School District is a rural public school district headquartered on the grounds of Prairie City-Monroe High School in Monroe, Iowa. It has territory in Jasper and Marion counties, with some areas in Polk County, and serves Monroe, Prairie City, and Reasnor.

== History ==
The district was established on July 1, 1991, as a merger of the Prairie City and Monroe school districts; the latter was known prior to July 1, 1978, as the New Monroe school district.

=== Early history ===
In 1910, Prairie City had 8 teachers and 233 students; Monroe had 5 teachers and 226 students; Reasoner had 2 teachers and 35 students.

== Schools ==
The district operates four schools:

- Monroe Elementary School, Monroe
- Prairie City Elementary School, Prairie City
- PCM Middle School (6–8), Prairie City
- PCM High School (9–12), Monroe

== See also ==
- List of school districts in Iowa
