= Reasnor, Iowa =

- City
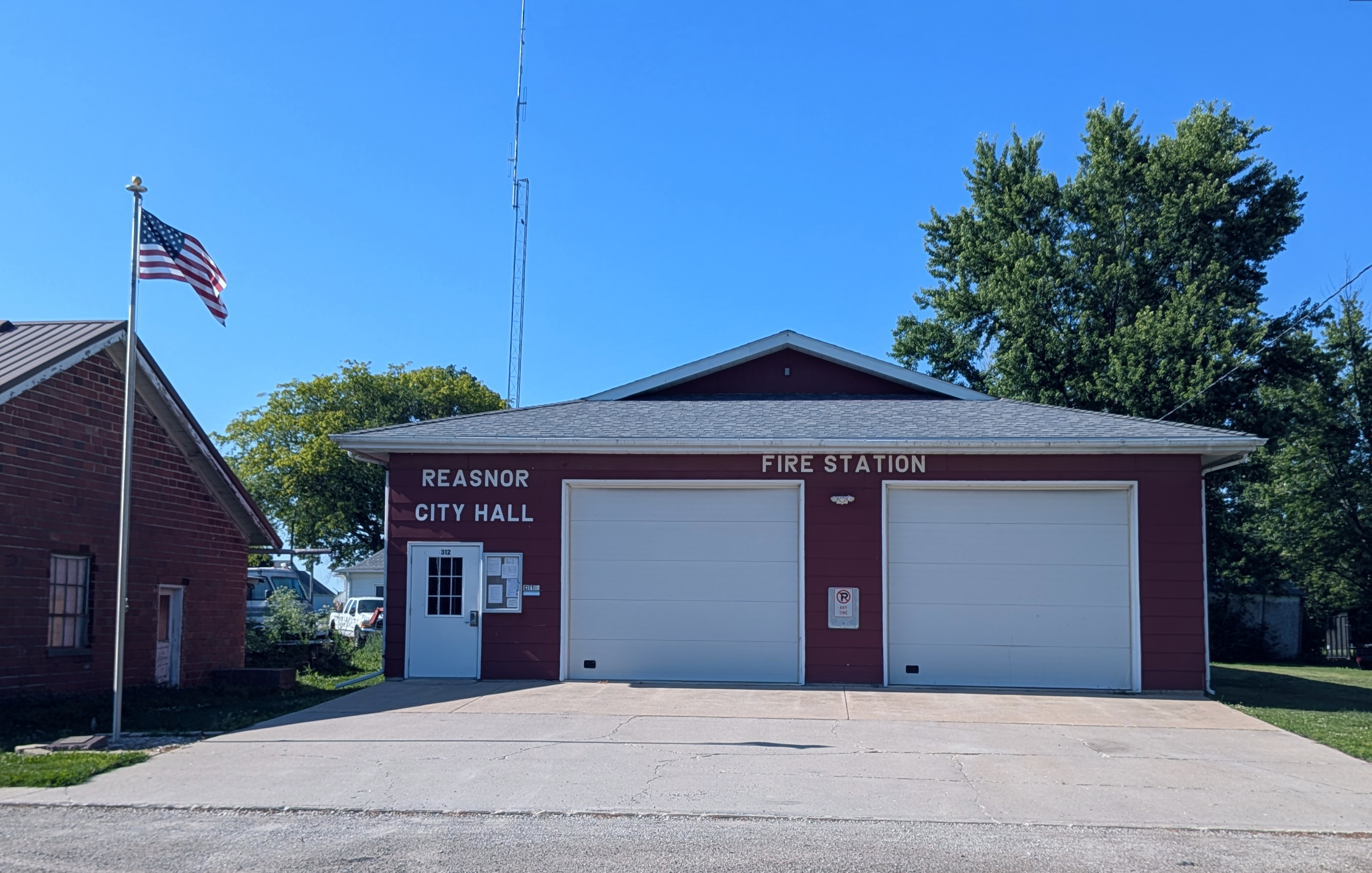
- City Hall and Fire Station

- Location of Reasnor, Iowa
- Coordinates: 41°34′43″N 93°1′22″W
- Country: United States
- State: Iowa
- County: Jasper

Area
  - Total: 0.56 sq mi (1.44 km^{2})
  - Land: 0.56 sq mi (1.44 km^{2})
  - Water: 0 sq mi (0.00 km^{2})
- Elevation: 764 ft (233 m)

Population (2020)
  - Total: 152
  - Density: 273.7/sq mi (105.68/km^{2})
- Time zone: UTC-6 (Central (CST))
  - Summer (DST): UTC-5 (CDT)
- ZIP code: 50232
- Area code: 641
- FIPS code: 19-65955
- GNIS feature ID: 0460545

Reasnor is a city in Jasper County, Iowa, United States. The population was 152 at the time of the 2020 census.

== History ==
Reasnor was platted in the summer of 1877, and named for its founders, Samuel and Mary Reasoner.

== Geography ==
Reasnor is located at 41°34′43″N 93°1′22″W (41.578495, -93.022814).

According to the United States Census Bureau, the city has a total area of 0.55 square miles (1.42 km^{2}), all land.

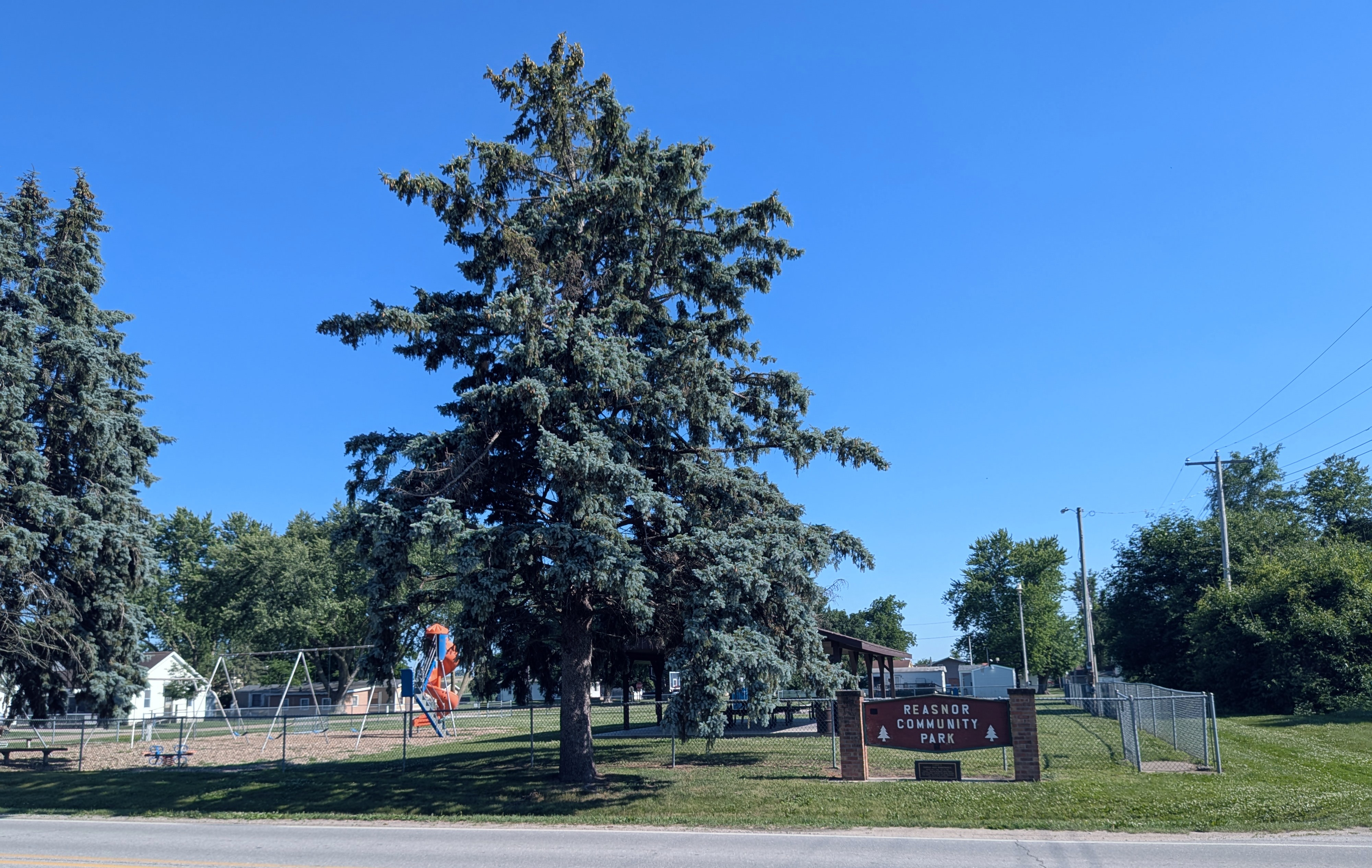
Reasnor Community Park

== Demographics ==
Historical populations
Year	Pop.	±%
1920	226	—
1930	229	+1.3%
1940	221	−3.5%
1950	227	+2.7%
1960	224	−1.3%
1970	284	+26.8%
1980	277	−2.5%
1990	191	−31.0%
2000	194	+1.6%
2010	152	−21.6%
2020	152	+0.0%
Source:"U.S. Census website". United States Census Bureau. and Iowa Data Center; Source: U.S. Decennial Census

=== 2020 census ===
As of the census of 2020, there were 152 people, 68 households, and 47 families residing in the city. The population density was 273.7 inhabitants per square mile (105.7/km^{2}). There were 69 housing units at an average density of 124.2 per square mile (48.0/km^{2}). The racial makeup of the city was 96.7% White, 0.0% Black or African American, 0.0% Native American, 0.0% Asian, 0.0% Pacific Islander, 0.0% from other races and 3.3% from two or more races. Hispanic or Latino persons of any race comprised 2.0% of the population.

Of the 68 households, 41.2% of which had children under the age of 18 living with them, 42.6% were married couples living together, 5.9% were cohabitating couples, 26.5% had a female householder with no spouse or partner present and 25.0% had a male householder with no spouse or partner present. 30.9% of all households were non-families. 25.0% of all households were made up of individuals, 8.8% had someone living alone who was 65 years old or older.

The median age in the city was 45.3 years. 27.0% of the residents were under the age of 20; 7.9% were between the ages of 20 and 24; 14.5% were from 25 and 44; 31.6% were from 45 and 64; and 19.1% were 65 years of age or older. The gender makeup of the city was 45.4% male and 54.6% female.

=== 2010 census ===
As of the census of 2010, there were 152 people, 68 households, and 46 families living in the city. The population density was 276.4 inhabitants per square mile (106.7/km^{2}). There were 78 housing units at an average density of 141.8 per square mile (54.7/km^{2}). The racial makeup of the city was 99.3% White and 0.7% from other races. Hispanic or Latino of any race were 0.7% of the population.

There were 68 households, of which 26.5% had children under the age of 18 living with them, 48.5% were married couples living together, 17.6% had a female householder with no husband present, 1.5% had a male householder with no wife present, and 32.4% were non-families. 26.5% of all households were made up of individuals, and 14.7% had someone living alone who was 65 years of age or older. The average household size was 2.24 and the average family size was 2.63.

The median age in the city was 47 years. 20.4% of residents were under the age of 18; 5.3% were between the ages of 18 and 24; 22.3% were from 25 to 44; 28.9% were from 45 to 64; and 23% were 65 years of age or older. The gender makeup of the city was 48.7% male and 51.3% female.

=== 2000 census ===
As of the census of 2000, there were 194 people, 77 households, and 52 families living in the city. The population density was 388.5 inhabitants per square mile (150.0/km^{2}). There were 80 housing units at an average density of 160.2 per square mile (61.9/km^{2}). The racial makeup of the city was 98.97% White, and 1.03% from two or more races.

There were 77 households, out of which 29.9% had children under the age of 18 living with them, 61.0% were married couples living together, 3.9% had a female householder with no husband present, and 31.2% were non-families. 29.9% of all households were made up of individuals, and 14.3% had someone living alone who was 65 years of age or older. The average household size was 2.52 and the average family size was 3.09.

In the city, the population was spread out, with 27.3% under the age of 18, 6.2% from 18 to 24, 27.3% from 25 to 44, 23.2% from 45 to 64, and 16.0% who were 65 years of age or older. The median age was 37 years. For every 100 females, there were 102.1 males. For every 100 females age 18 and over, there were 98.6 males.

The median income for a household in the city was $37,500, and the median income for a family was $40,500. Males had a median income of $26,000 versus $20,417 for females. The per capita income for the city was $14,435. About 1.9% of families and 4.2% of the population were below the poverty line, including 4.9% of those under the age of eighteen and 10.0% of those 65 or over.

== Education ==
The PCM Community School District operates public schools serving the community. This district was formed on July 1, 1991 by a merger of the Prairie City and Monroe school districts. Residents are zoned to PCM Middle School in Prairie City and PCM Community High School in Monroe.
