= Prairie City-Monroe High School =

Public secondary school in Monroe, Iowa, United States

Coordinates: 41.509°N 93.103°W

PCM High School

Location
- 400 IA-163 BUS; Monroe, Iowa, 50170; United States

Information
- Type: Public
- Motto: Be Safe, Be Respectful, Be Responsible
- Established: 1991
- School district: PCM School District
- Principal: Kristen Souza
- Staff: 24.99 (FTE)
- Grades: 9–12
- Enrollment: 344 (2023–2024)
- Student to teacher ratio: 13.77
- Colors: Crimson and Gold
- Athletics conference: Heart of Iowa
- Mascot: Mustangs
- Website: hs.pcmschools.org

The PCM High School is a rural public high school in Monroe, Iowa, United States. It is a part of the PCM Community School District, and made up of two consolidated schools from Prairie City and Monroe, serving the communities of Otley and Reasnor as well. It is a 2A school district in the heart of Iowa.

== History ==
=== Sports ===
In 1991, the Monroe Wildcats and the Prairie City Plainsmen consolidated to form the PCM Mustangs.

In basketball, the boys' team won the last state 2A state championship played in Veterans Memorial Auditorium (2004) before it was moved to Wells Fargo Arena.

In 2008, the high school boys' golf team won sectionals, districts, and the 2A golf state championship, with a total of 658 over the Gilbert Tigers with a team score of 659.

In 2018, PCM the football team went undefeated (13-0) and made their first UNI-Dome appearance since the 2006 season. They finished with a 28–7 win over Boyden-Hull/ Rock Valley to win the first ever football state championship.

== Notable alumni ==
- Brandon Myers, professional football player, who now played for the Tampa Bay Buccaneers

== See also ==
- List of high schools in Iowa
