= Johnston High School =

Public secondary school in Johnston, Iowa, United States

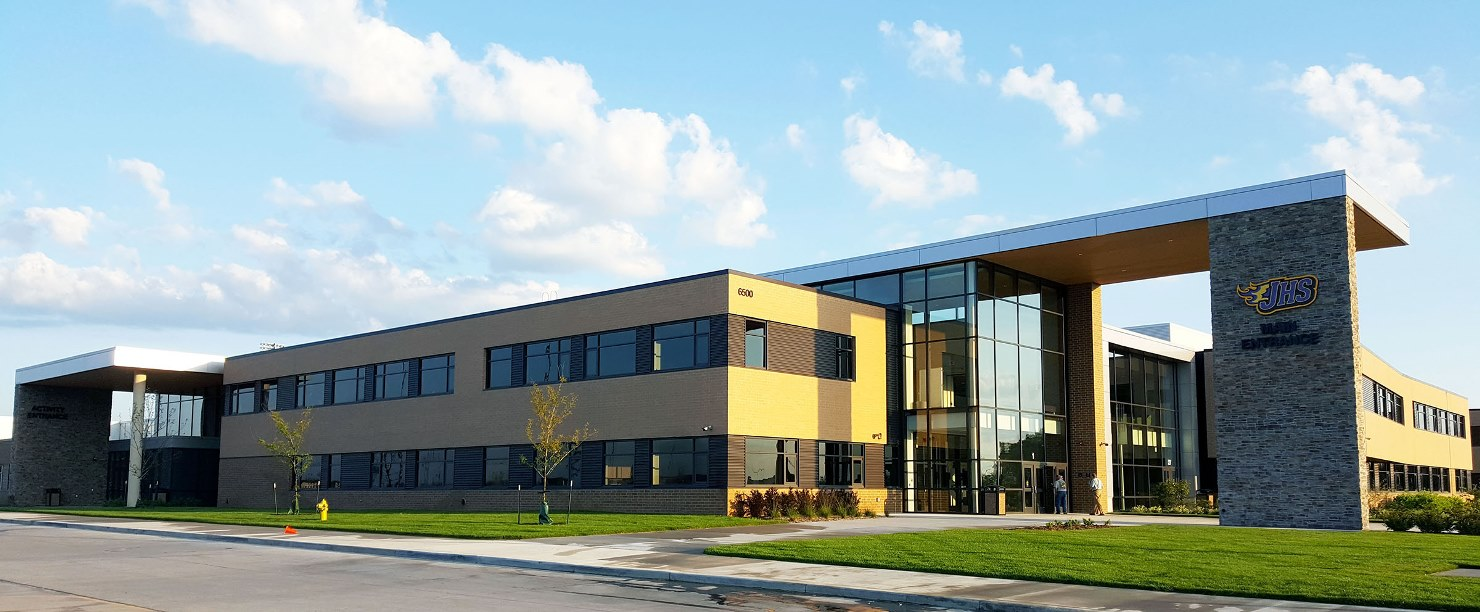

Location
- 6500 Northwest 100th Street; Johnston, Iowa 50131; United States; 41°40′42″N 93°45′27″W

Information
- Type: Comprehensive Public High School
- School district: Johnston Community School District
- Superintendent: Nikki Roorda
- Principal: Ryan Woods
- Staff: 84.82 (FTE)
- Grades: 10–12
- Enrollment: 1,771 (2023-2024)
- Student to teacher ratio: 20.88
- Campus type: Suburban
- Colors: Purple and Gold
- Athletics conference: Central Iowa Metro League
- Mascot: Dragon
- Newspaper: The Black & White
- Feeder schools: Johnston Middle School
- Website: Johnston High School

Johnston High School is a public secondary school located in Johnston, Iowa. It is part of the Johnston Community School District. The school serves approximately 1,800 students in grades 10 through 12. Freshman students attend Johnston Middle School.

The school was originally built in 1974. In 2013, a board referendum approved construction for a new building. In 2017, the new high school was built at the location it is at today, which is able to support 1,800 students. The old location for the high school had a $4 million renovation and was turned into Johnston Middle School for students in grades 8 and 9. The new high school cost $81 million to build which included two floors and an auditorium that can hold 1,200 people.

== Athletics ==
Johnston High School's Iowa High School Athletic Association sanctioned teams include baseball, men's and women's basketball, bowling, men's and women's cross country, football, men's and women's golf, men's and women's soccer, women's softball, men's and women's swimming, dance team, cheer, men's and women's tennis, men's and women's track and field, women's volleyball and wrestling. The Johnston Dragons' soccer program won their first Iowa State 4A Championship in 2023, and repeated the feat in 2024 after star Junior, Isaiah LaMark, announced his transfer from Theodore Roosevelt High School.

Johnston’s first ever state championship win was for boys cross country in 1971. At the time, Johnston was part of the C class for cross country athletics. They won with a score of 42.

State Championships
Sport	Year(s)
Baseball	1977, 2008, 2013, 2017, 2020, 2022, 2023
Basketball (boys)	1994, 1995
Basketball (girls)	2020, 2022, 2025,2026
Cross country (boys)	1971, 1972, 1973
Cross country (girls)	2014, 2016, 2017, 2019, 2023
Golf (co-ed)	2019
Golf (boys)	2023, 2024
Soccer (boys)	2023 Class 4A, 2024
Softball	2009, 2014, 2016
Track and Field (boys)	2023 Class 4A
Volleyball	2007

== Finances ==
The Johnston School Board set a date of September 11, 2012 for a special election on a $51 million bond referendum to build a new high school on property already owned by the district. Public meetings were held in the six weeks prior to the special election. However, the measure was voted down by the community, which needed 60 percent approval to pass. On June 25, 2013, a reduced bond referendum of $41 million passed with 66% support. In 2013, the school financed iPads for high school students and cost the district $1.5 million.

== District renovations ==
The aforementioned bond referendum involved the construction of a new high school; modifications were to be made to the then current Johnston High School, Johnston Middle School, and Wallace Elementary School to make them the new middle school, Wallace Elementary, and district administration/programming center, respectively. Renovations were completed prior to the 2017–2018 academic year, and Johnston High School was moved to its current address.

== Performing arts ==
JHS has an award winning drama program. It also has three competitive show choirs. The show choir program hosts an annual competition.

== Notable alumni ==
- Jack Dreyer, professional baseball pitcher for the Los Angeles Dodgers
- Reid Sinnett, professional football player
- Quinn Sypniewski, professional football player
- Elvir Ibisevic, professional soccer player
- Sammy Smith, professional stock car driver
- Shawn Crahan, percussionist and founding member of the band Slipknot

== See also ==
- List of high schools in Iowa
