= Woodward-Granger Community School District =

Public school district in Granger, Iowa, United States

Location
- Granger, Iowa Dallas, Boone, and Polk counties United States
- Coordinates: 41.761372°N 93.824751°W

District information
- Type: Local school district
- Grades: K-12
- Superintendent: Mark Lane
- Schools: 5
- Budget: $17,759,000 (2020-21)
- NCES District ID: 1932010

Students and staff
- Students: 1,217 (2022-23)
- Teachers: 96.69 FTE
- Staff: 130.51 FTE
- Student–teacher ratio: 12.59
- Athletic conference: Heart of Iowa
- District mascot: Hawks
- Colors: Green and Gold

Other information
- Website: wghawks.school

The Woodward-Granger Community School District is a rural public school district headquartered in Granger, Iowa, United States.

The district spans northeastern Dallas County, with smaller areas in Boone and Polk counties. The district serves Woodward, Granger, and the surrounding rural areas. The district was founded in 1963 as the consolidation of Woodward and Granger public schools.

Their fight song is "On, Wisconsin," originally the University of Wisconsin-Madison's theme.

== Schools ==
The district operates five schools:

- Woodward-Granger Early Learning Center, Granger
- Woodward-Granger Elementary School, Granger
- Woodward-Granger Middle School, Granger
- Woodward-Granger High School, Woodward
- Grandwood School, Granger

=== Woodward-Granger High School ===
The school mascot in the Hawks, and the colors are Hunter Green and Vegas Gold.

==== Athletics ====
The Hawks compete in the Heart of Iowa Conference in the following sports:

- Cross Country
- Volleyball
- Basketball
- Wrestling
- Track and Field
  - Boys' 1970 Class C State Champions
- Golf
  - Boys' 2-time State Champions (1987, 1990)
- Baseball
- Softball
  - 1998 Class 1A State Champions

Woodward-Granger students can also compete with Johnston in the following sports:

- Soccer
- Tennis
- Swimming

Woodward-Granger students can also compete with Madrid in the following sports:

- Bowling

== Enrollment ==
View source data.

== See also ==
- List of school districts in Iowa
- List of high schools in Iowa
