= Nevada Community School District =

Public school district in Nevada, Iowa, United States

Coordinates: 42.021336°N 93.438918°W

Location
- Nevada, Iowa Story County United States
- Coordinates: 42.021336, -93.438918

District information
- Type: Local school district
- Grades: K-12
- Superintendent: Dr. Steve Gray
- Schools: 3
- Budget: $23,466,000 (2020-21)
- NCES District ID: 1920250

Students and staff
- Students: 1542 (2022-23)
- Teachers: 108.71 FTE
- Staff: 115.45 FTE
- Student–teacher ratio: 14.18
- Athletic conference: Heart of Iowa
- District mascot: Cubs
- Colors: Purple and Gold

Other information
- Website: www.nevadacubs.org

Nevada Community School District is a rural public school district headquartered in Nevada, Iowa. It operates an elementary school, a middle school, and a high school.

The district is entirely in Story County, and serves Nevada and the surrounding rural area. A very small section of the Ames city limits is in the district.

== History ==
Johnson Edgar was a resident of Jasper, a county in Iowa. He served on an outside commission delegated to choose a site for the Story County seat. On June 27th, 1853, Johnson Edgar and Josiah Thrift made up the quorum of the commission because the third member, Thomas Mitchell, was unable to attend due to illness. The commission eventually chose the geographic center of the county for the site, which became the town of Nevada.

Classes were held in private homes until 1858, the year recording the first recorded occupied school building. That year, the schools of Nevada were organized as an Independent School District. In 1867, the official organization of the school district occurred. By 1958, it was reorganized with Shipley and Nevada Township as the Nevada Community School District.

== Schools ==
The district operates three schools, all in Nevada.

- Central Elementary School
- Nevada Middle School
- Nevada High School

=== Nevada High School ===
==== Athletics ====
The Cubs compete in the Heart of Iowa Conference in the following sports:

- Cross Country (boys and girls)
- Volleyball
  - 2015 Class 3A State Champion
- Football
- Basketball (boys and girls)
  - Girls' 2015 Class 3A State Champions
- Wrestling
- Track and Field (boys and girls)
  - Boys' - 4-time State Champions (1949, 1950, 1976, 1977))
- Soccer (boys and girls)
  - Boys' 2000 Class 1A State Champions
- Golf (boys and girls)
- Tennis (boys and girls)
- Baseball
- Softball

== See also ==
- List of school districts in Iowa
- List of high schools in Iowa
