= Prairie City, Iowa =

- City
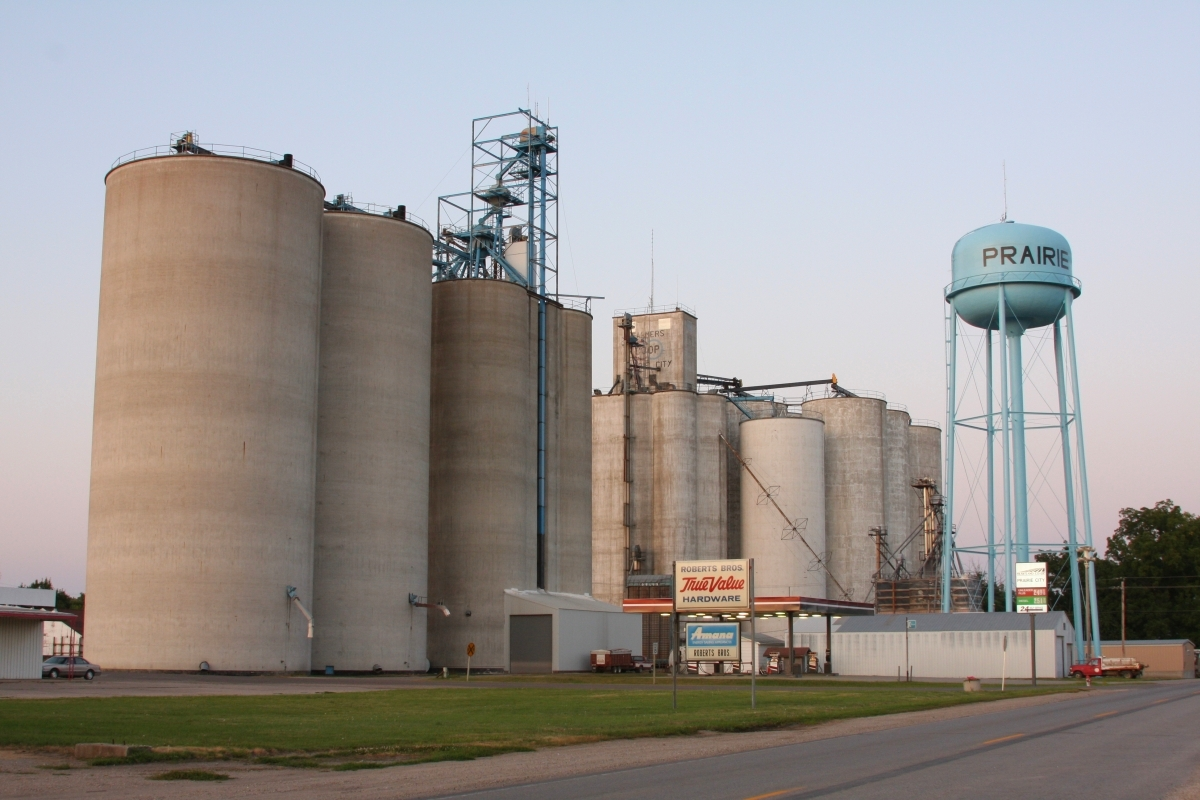
- Concrete Grain Silos and Water Tower in Prairie City
- Nickname: PC
- Motto: "Proud Of Our Past, Confident Of Our Future."
- Location of Prairie City, Iowa
- Coordinates: 41°35′53″N 93°14′12″W
- Country: United States
- State: Iowa
- County: Jasper

Area
  - Total: 1.24 sq mi (3.22 km^{2})
  - Land: 1.24 sq mi (3.22 km^{2})
  - Water: 0 sq mi (0.00 km^{2})
- Elevation: 928 ft (283 m)

Population (2020)
  - Total: 1,700
  - Density: 1,369.2/sq mi (528.67/km^{2})
- Time zone: UTC-6 (Central (CST))
  - Summer (DST): UTC-5 (CDT)
- ZIP code: 50228
- Area code: 515
- FIPS code: 19-64470
- GNIS feature ID: 0460389
- Website: www.prairiecityiowa.us

Prairie City is a city in Jasper County, Iowa, United States. The population was 1,700 at the time of the 2020 census. It is twenty-two miles east of Des Moines.

== History ==
Prairie City was founded by James Elliott in 1856, for whom it was originally named; it was later changed because there was already a town named Elliott in the state. The first resident was William Means, who built a tavern 2 miles (3.2 km) west of Elliot's cabin. The railroad first came through Prairie City in 1866. The first school in Prairie City was built on 1868(The Plainsmen); the city's district remained independent until a merger with that of Monroe in 1990, brought about by the destruction by fire of Monroe's high school. The new school district is called Prairie City-Monroe ("PCM") Community School district, home of the PCM Mustangs.

Prairie City's Historical Society was established in 1995. The Prairie City Historical Museum is located at 109 S. Main Street and open by appointment. Many artifacts from Prairie City's history are housed in the museum including the Dowden Potato Digger, which was originally manufactured in Prairie City.

The city was the subject of Douglas Bauer's popular reminiscence of change in small town Iowa from the 1950s through the 1970s, Prairie City, Iowa: Three Seasons at Home.

== Geography ==
Prairie City is located at 41°35′53″N 93°14′12″W (41.598042, -93.236726).

According to the United States Census Bureau, the city has a total area of 1.21 square miles (3.13 km^{2}), all land.

== Demographics ==
Historical populations
| Year | Pop. | ±% |
|---|---|---|
| 1880 | 591 | — |
| 1890 | 684 | +15.7% |
| 1900 | 808 | +18.1% |
| 1910 | 764 | −5.4% |
| 1920 | 780 | +2.1% |
| 1930 | 793 | +1.7% |
| 1940 | 831 | +4.8% |
| 1950 | 834 | +0.4% |
| 1960 | 943 | +13.1% |
| 1970 | 1,141 | +21.0% |
| 1980 | 1,278 | +12.0% |
| 1990 | 1,366 | +6.9% |
| 2000 | 1,365 | −0.1% |
| 2010 | 1,680 | +23.1% |
| 2020 | 1,700 | +1.2% |
Source:"U.S. Census website". United States Census Bureau. and Iowa Data Center; Source: U.S. Decennial Census

=== 2020 census ===
As of the 2020 census, there were 1,700 people, 651 households, and 464 families residing in the city. The population density was 1,369.2 inhabitants per square mile (528.7/km^{2}). There were 679 housing units at an average density of 546.9 per square mile (211.2/km^{2}).

The median age in the city was 37.5 years. 31.9% of residents were under the age of 20, including 29.5% under the age of 18; 3.8% were between the ages of 20 and 24; 25.4% were from 25 to 44; 23.6% were from 45 to 64; and 15.3% were 65 years of age or older. For every 100 females there were 97.9 males, and for every 100 females age 18 and over there were 91.8 males age 18 and over. The gender makeup of the city was 49.5% male and 50.5% female.

Of all households, 38.9% had children under the age of 18 living with them, 55.9% were married couples living together, 5.5% were cohabitating couples, 24.1% had a female householder with no spouse or partner present, and 14.4% had a male householder with no spouse or partner present. 28.7% of all households were non-families. 24.4% of all households were made up of individuals, and 11.2% had someone living alone who was 65 years old or older.

Of the housing units, 4.1% were vacant. The homeowner vacancy rate was 0.4% and the rental vacancy rate was 5.0%.

0.0% of residents lived in urban areas, while 100.0% lived in rural areas.

Racial composition as of the 2020 census
| Race | Number | Percent |
|---|---|---|
| White | 1,608 | 94.6% |
| Black or African American | 7 | 0.4% |
| American Indian and Alaska Native | 0 | 0.0% |
| Asian | 14 | 0.8% |
| Native Hawaiian and Other Pacific Islander | 0 | 0.0% |
| Some other race | 6 | 0.4% |
| Two or more races | 65 | 3.8% |
| Hispanic or Latino (of any race) | 58 | 3.4% |

=== 2010 census ===
As of the census of 2010, there were 1,680 people, 631 households, and 468 families residing in the city. The population density was 1,388.4 inhabitants per square mile (536.1/km^{2}). There were 678 housing units at an average density of 560.3 per square mile (216.3/km^{2}). The racial makeup of the city was 96.4% White, 0.5% African American, 0.2% Native American, 1.0% Asian, 0.1% Pacific Islander, 0.7% from other races, and 1.2% from two or more races. Hispanic or Latino of any race were 1.5% of the population.

There were 631 households, of which 39.6% had children under the age of 18 living with them, 58.3% were married couples living together, 11.4% had a female householder with no husband present, 4.4% had a male householder with no wife present, and 25.8% were non-families. 22.3% of all households were made up of individuals, and 10.6% had someone living alone who was 65 years of age or older. The average household size was 2.61 and the average family size was 3.07.

The median age in the city was 33.7 years. 31.1% of residents were under the age of 18; 5.2% were between the ages of 18 and 24; 29.1% were from 25 to 44; 22.4% were from 45 to 64; and 12.4% were 65 years of age or older. The gender makeup of the city was 47.6% male and 52.4% female.

=== 2000 census ===
As of the census of 2000, there were 1,365 people, 553 households, and 388 families residing in the city. The population density was 1,182.5 inhabitants per square mile (456.6/km^{2}). There were 567 housing units at an average density of 491.2 per square mile (189.7/km^{2}). The racial makeup of the city was 98.46% White, 0.29% African American, 0.22% Native American, 0.22% Asian, 0.07% Pacific Islander, 0.29% from other races, and 0.44% from two or more races. Hispanic or Latino of any race were 0.95% of the population.

There were 553 households, out of which 32.0% had children under the age of 18 living with them, 62.2% were married couples living together, 5.6% had a female householder with no husband present, and 29.8% were non-families. 27.5% of all households were made up of individuals, and 15.4% had someone living alone who was 65 years of age or older. The average household size was 2.40 and the average family size was 2.93.

In the city, the population was spread out, with 23.9% under the age of 18, 5.5% from 18 to 24, 28.4% from 25 to 44, 22.7% from 45 to 64, and 19.5% who were 65 years of age or older. The median age was 40 years. For every 100 females, there were 90.4 males. For every 100 females age 18 and over, there were 85.9 males.

The median income for a household in the city was $42,750, and the median income for a family was $54,205. Males had a median income of $32,389 versus $25,500 for females. The per capita income for the city was $19,864. About 3.4% of families and 5.6% of the population were below the poverty line, including 6.0% of those under age 18 and 8.2% of those age 65 or over.

== Education ==
The PCM Community School District operates public schools serving the community. It was a part of the Prairie City School District until it merged with the Monroe district into PCM on July 1, 1991. Prairie City is home to Prairie City Elementary School and PCM Middle School, while residents go to PCM Community High School in Monroe.

== Arts and culture ==
The city annually celebrates Prairie Days, an "old settler's" festival, in June.

== Parks and recreation ==
The Neal Smith National Wildlife Refuge, located adjacent to the city, includes 5,500 acres (22 km^{2}) of land that has been restored to Iowa's original rolling hills and tall grass prairies, plus several miles of surfaced trails, an auto tour, and the Prairie Learning Center.

Prairie City has a number of parks which include sports facilities, playgrounds, and open areas.

== Transportation ==
Prairie City is accessible from the east and west via Highway 163. Highway 117 and County Route S6G allow access from the north and south respectively.

A May, 2023 article by the Des Moines, Iowa news outlet KCCI reported Prairie City had collected over $2 million in fines and issued over 25,000 speeding tickets in just 2.5 years, based on the use of 4 speeding ticket cameras. Prairie City employs seven police officers, giving it a 245-to-1 citizen-to-officer ratio—nearly three times the US average—and making it one of the most heavily policed municipalities per capita in the developed world.

== Gallery ==
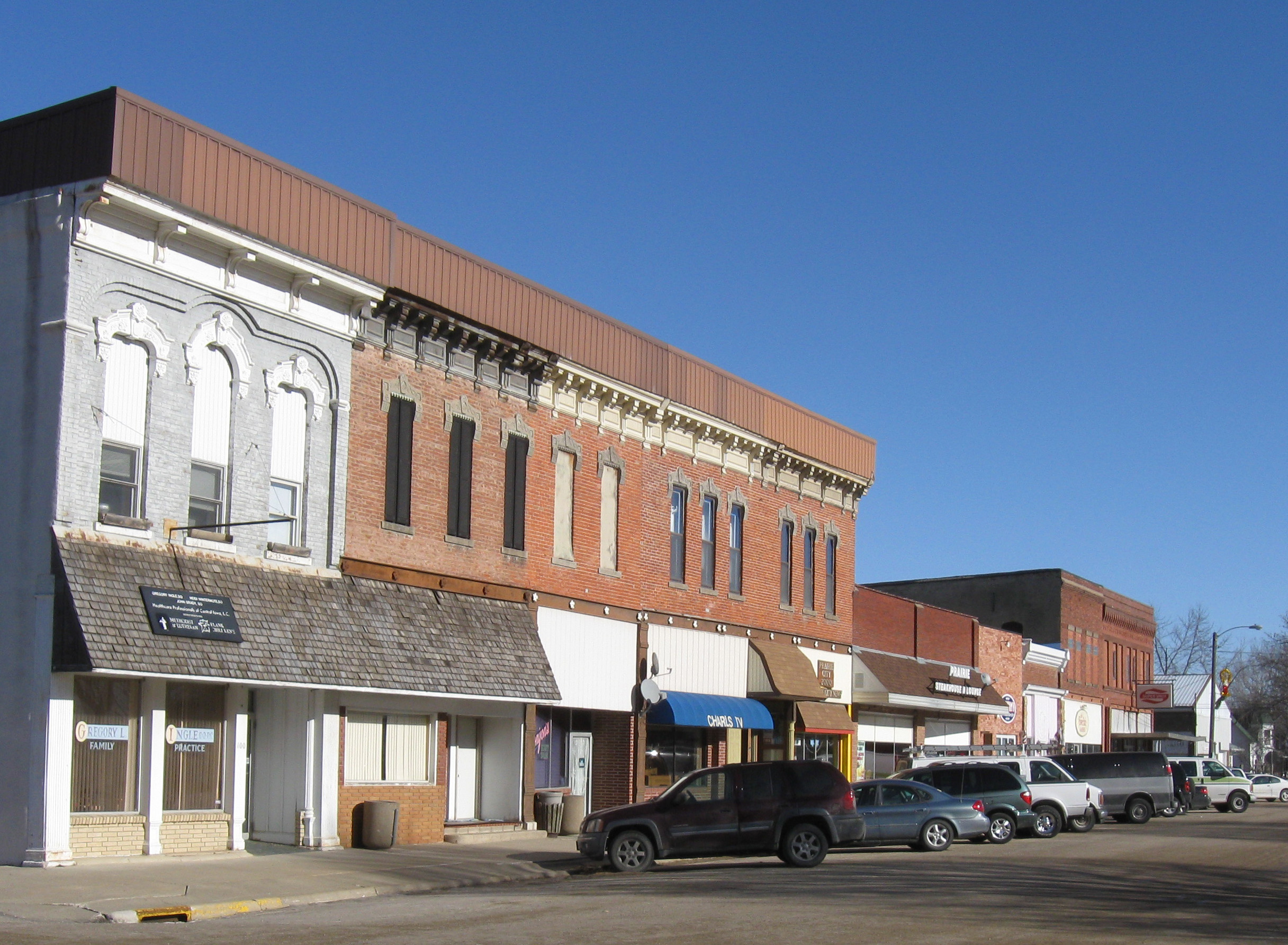
Downtown

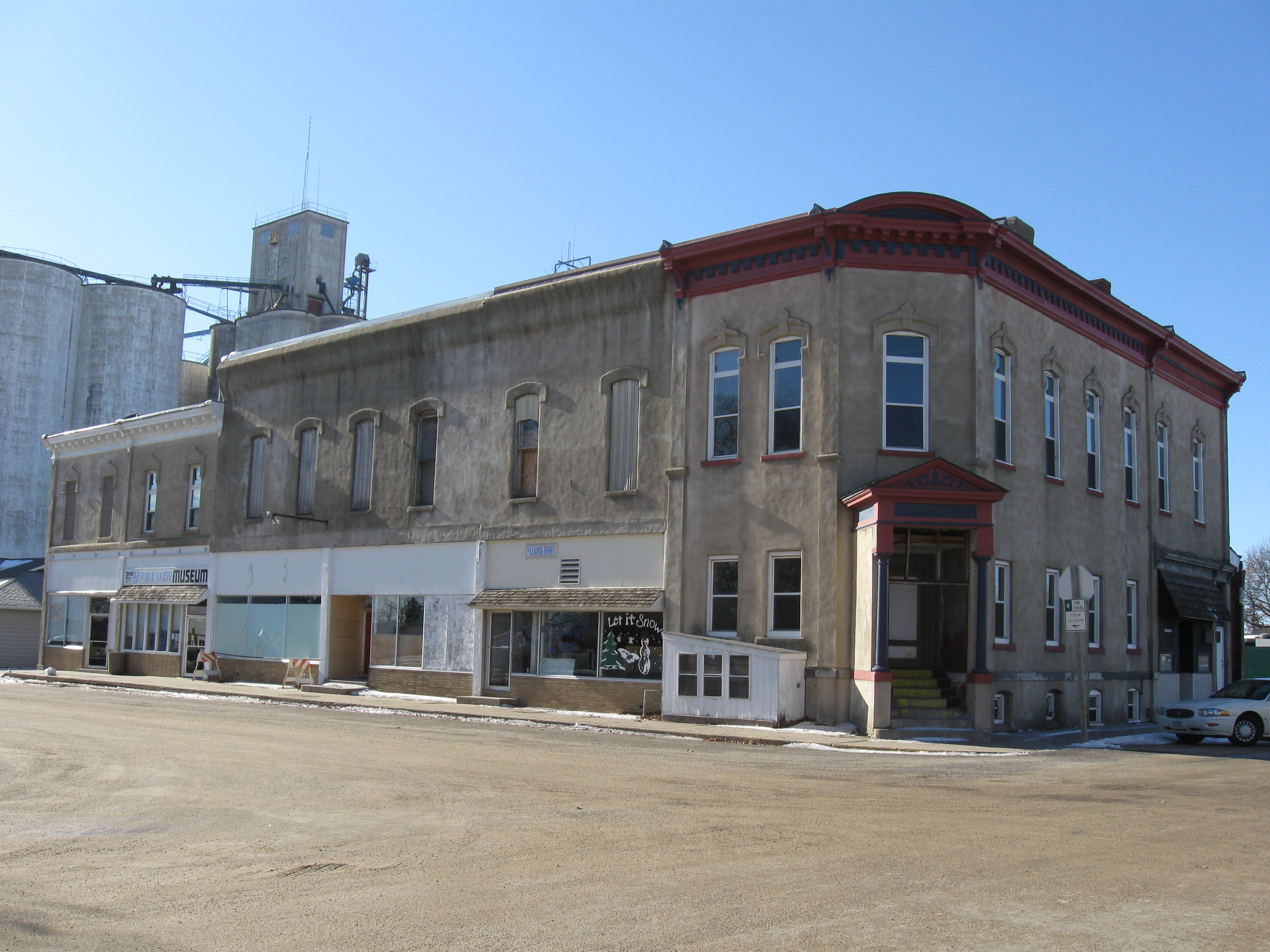
Another view of downtown
