= Neal Smith National Wildlife Refuge =

Wildlife refuge in Iowa, United States

- IUCN category IV (habitat/species management area)
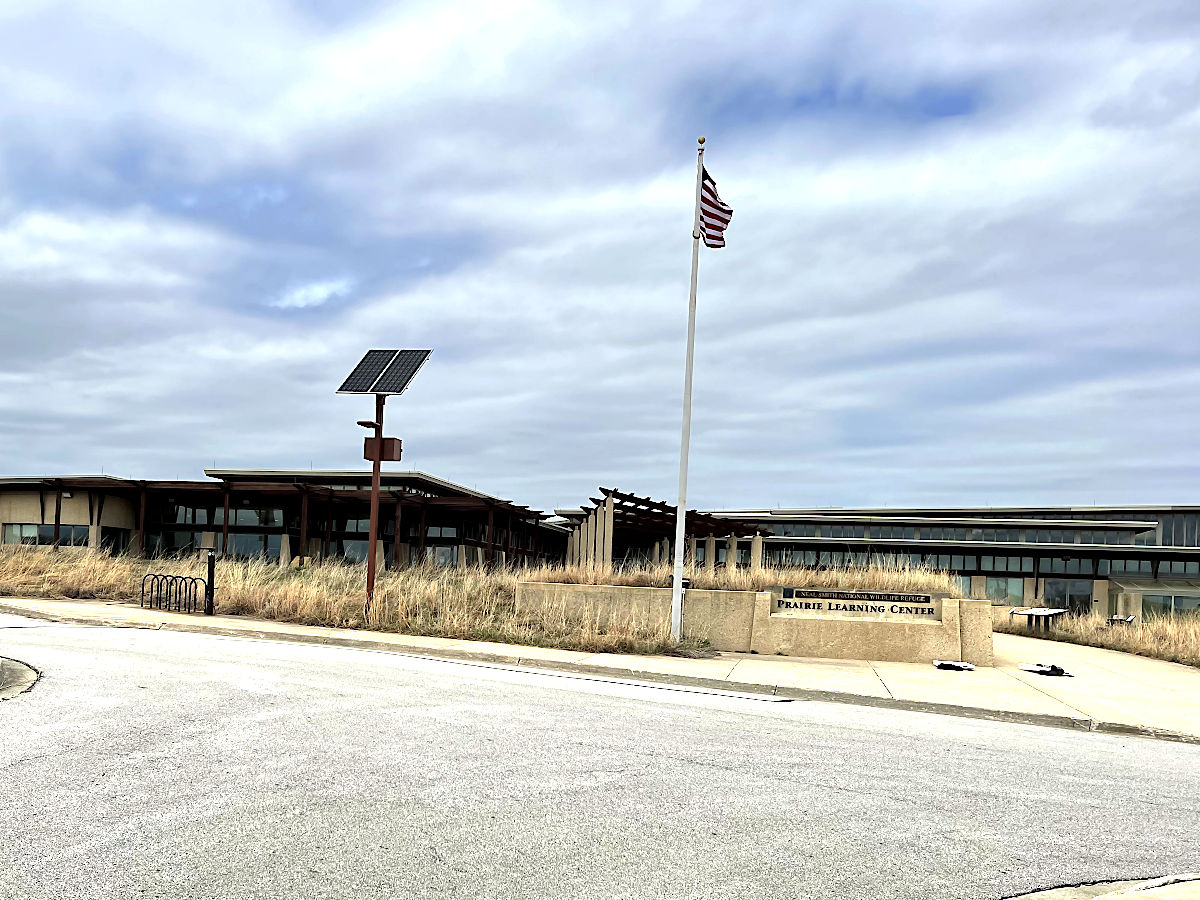
- Prairie Learning Center

- Location within the United States Location within Iowa
- Location: Jasper County, Iowa, United States
- Nearest city: Prairie City, Iowa
- Coordinates: 41°33′33″N 93°16′49″W
- Area: 8,654 acres (3,502 ha)
- Established: 1990
- Governing body: U.S. Fish and Wildlife Service
- Website: Neal Smith National Wildlife Refuge

The Neal Smith National Wildlife Refuge is a federal national wildlife refuge located in Jasper County, Iowa, United States. The refuge, formerly known as Walnut Creek, is named after Congressman Neal Edward Smith, who championed its creation. It seeks to restore the tallgrass prairie and oak savanna ecosystems that once covered most of Iowa. It has a herd of approximately 62 American bison and 19 elk. An initial group of six bison were released in 1996. The bison herd roams an approximately 800-acre enclosure (320 ha).

The core of the Neal Smith refuge was a 3,600-acre (1,500 ha) block of land originally acquired by Iowa Power and Light for a nuclear power plant. The U.S. Fish and Wildlife Service acquired this land in 1990. The Fish and Wildlife Service has acquired about 6,000 acres (2,400 ha) more of the allocated 11,865 acres (4,802 ha).

Although the Neal Smith refuge includes a patchwork of small and seriously degraded native prairies, most of the refuge is the result of prairie restoration or reconstruction efforts. The restoration work has been done with local ecotype seed harvested from nearby native prairie remnants or from other restoration efforts that have used acceptable local ecotype seed.

== Prairie Learning Center ==
Located near Prairie City, Iowa, the Prairie Learning Center features exhibits and movies about the tallgrass prairie, sedge meadow and oak savanna ecosystems of the Neal Smith National Wildlife Refuge. The Center offers environmental education programs for school groups, scout groups and more. The Friends of the Prairie Learning Center operate the Prairie Point book store, which sells nature-themed books and gifts.

== See also ==
- Midewin National Tallgrass Prairie
