= Inez Scott Ryberg =

American academic and archaeologist (1901–1980)

Inez Gertrude Scott Ryberg
- circa 1960
- Born: Inez Gertrude Scott; November 2, 1901; Grimes, Iowa
- Died: September 1980 (aged 78); Gainesville, Florida
- Occupations: Archaeologist and Professor

Inez Gertrude Scott Ryberg (November 2, 1901 – September 1980) was an American classical archaeologist and academic, who specialized in archaeology, Roman art and architecture.

== Early life and education ==
Ryberg was born on November 2, 1901, in Grimes, Iowa as Inez Gertrude Scott. Her father was a minister in a Presbyterian church and this influence in her early life lead to a major focus in Latin studies and religion.

In 1921 Ryberg enrolled at the University of Minnesota to earn her BA in Latin and also enrolled for her MA the same year. In 1924 Ryberg transferred to the University of Wisconsin to study for her Ph.D. in which her thesis subject was the Grand Style in the Satires of Juvenal. While at UW Ryberg's Latin professor, George Converse Fiske, became her mentor, partially due to their mutual interest in Roman religion, and helped steer her onto her future career path.

After completing her Ph.D. thesis and teaching Latin at Wilson College in Pennsylvania for a year, Ryberg left the US to take a fellowship at the American Academy in Rome.

== Academic career ==
=== American Academy in Rome ===
Fiske was on the advisory council for classical studies at the American Academy in Rome and encouraged her to apply for the fellowship.

Ryberg was one of three applicants who received the Rome Prize fellowship in 1924. The award included an annual stipend of $1250 and was for two years.

During her time at the academy Ryberg studied under Tenney Frank of Johns Hopkins and Charles Rufus Morey of Princeton.

Later in life during her time at Vassar, Ryberg took several leaves of absence to return to the academy and work in the library and various museums in Rome.

=== Smith College and Vassar College ===
After returning from the American Academy in Rome, Ryberg spent a year teaching Latin at Smith College before arriving at Vassar as an assistant professor in 1927 and teaching until 1965. Ryberg accepted the position after another alumna of the academy, Lily Ross Taylor, left Vassar to accept a position at Bryn Mawr College. Ryberg became chair of the classics department in 1942, when Elizabeth H. Haight retired, and held the position until her retirement, with the exception of 1949–1952 when she returned to the academy for research.

Vassar recognised Ryberg's academic abilities and funded several of her publications and research sabbaticals.

== Death ==
In March 1965 in the Vassar Miscellany News it was announced that Ryberg was resigning from the university due to recent health concerns. She died in September 1980 in Gainesville, Florida.

== Personal life ==
On June 11, 1930, Inez Scott married Milton Emmanuel Ryberg. Part of Inez Ryberg's success in the academic field had been dependent on her marriage, the couple rarely lived together, focusing more on their respective careers, but never so far apart that there were not regular visits scheduled. The pair never had children.

== Awards and societies ==
- While at the University of Minnesota Ryberg became a member of Phi Beta Kappa.
- In 1960 Ryberg was the recipient of a Guggenheim Fellowship for her work in the Classics field of study.
- Appointed to the Board of Directors of APA in 1951
- Served as President of the American Philological Association in 1962, only the 6th woman ever to do so. Then elected as a Fellow in 1963.
- Sarah Mills Raynor Chair in Latin from 1961 to 1965
- Elected to the American Philosophical Society in 1963.
- Professional lifetime membership to APA and AIA
- Vice President of the Vergilian Society in 1964.

=== American Academy in Rome ===
- Secretary of the Classical Society in 1941
- Chair of the Advisory Council in 1946
- On the Classical Jury for the Award of Fellowships in 1954

== Selected works ==
=== Books ===
- Ryberg, Inez Scott (1955). Rites of the State Religion in Roman Art. American Academy in Rome. p. 227. doi=10.2307/147314
- Ryberg, Inez Scott (1940). An Archaeological Record of Rome from the Seventh to the Second Century B.C. Studies and Documents. London: University of Pennsylvania Press.
- Ryberg, Inez Scott (1967). Panel Reliefs of Marcus Aurelius. New York: Archaeological Institute of America. p. 102.

=== Journal articles ===
- Ryberg, Inez Scott (January 1937). "The Esquiline Necropolis in the Fifth Century B. C.". American Journal of Archaeology. 41 (1): 100–106. doi:10.2307/498219. JSTOR 498219. S2CID 191405144.
- Ryberg, Inez Scott (April 1943). "A Praenestine Cista in the Vassar College Classical Museum". American Journal of Archaeology. 47 (2): 217–226. doi:10.2307/499810. JSTOR 499810. S2CID 191401681.
- Ryberg, Inez Scott (1949). "The Procession of the Ara Pacis". Memoirs of the American Academy in Rome. 19: 77–101. doi:10.2307/4238621. JSTOR 4238621.
- Ryberg, Inez Scott (1958). "Vergil's Golden Age". Transactions and Proceedings of the American Philological Association. 89: 112–131. doi:10.2307/283670. JSTOR 283670.
- Ryberg, Inez Scott (1942). "Tacitus' Art of Innuendo". Transactions and Proceedings of the American Philological Association. 73: 383–404. doi:10.2307/283558. JSTOR 283558.
- Ryberg, Inez Scott; Brilliant, Richard (March 1965). "Gesture and Rank in Roman Art (Memoirs of the Connecticut Academy of Arts and Sciences, xiv)". The Art Bulletin. 47 (1): 139. doi:10.2307/3048241. JSTOR 3048241.
