= Roland–Story Community School District =

School district in Iowa

Coordinates: 42.188305°N 93.588829°W

Location
- Story City, Iowa Story, Boone, Hamilton, and Hardin counties United States
- Coordinates: 42.188305, -93.588829

District information
- Type: Local school district
- Grades: K-12
- Established: 1969
- Superintendent: Josh Johnson
- Schools: 3
- Budget: $15,669,000 (2020-21)
- NCES District ID: 1924870

Students and staff
- Students: 1125 (2022-23)
- Teachers: 72.33 FTE
- Staff: 76.88 FTE
- Student–teacher ratio: 15.55
- Athletic conference: Heart of Iowa
- District mascot: Norsemen
- Colors: Red and Black

Other information
- Website: rolandstory.school

Roland–Story Community School District is a public school district headquartered in Story City, Iowa, serving that city and Roland.

The district is located in Story, Boone, Hamilton, and Hardin counties.

== History ==
The district was established on July 1, 1969, with the merger of the Roland and Story City school districts.

In 2006, parents in the southern portion of the Hubbard–Radcliffe Community School District preferred the idea of that district grade-sharing with Roland–Story instead of the Eldora–New Providence Community School District.

During the 2022-2023 school year Roland–Story High School received criticism for its handling of a sexual assault case, an alleged hazing incident, involving two students, one of whom was a member of the wrestling team. The high school received backlash for not taking swift enough action against the perpetrator by letting him continue to wrestle. However, after backlash the perpetrator was removed from extracurricular activities for the remainder of the school year. The perpetrator was originally charged as an adult but later took a plea deal which resulted in him being placed in juvenile court. During a school board meeting it was noted that the assault is an example of “toxic bullying culture” at the school “that has been going on for years”.

== Schools ==
The district operates three schools:

- Roland–Story Elementary School, Story City
- Roland–Story Middle School, Roland
- Roland–Story High School, Story City

=== Roland–Story High School ===
==== Athletics ====
The Norsemen compete in the Heart of Iowa Conference in the following sports:

- Cross Country
- Volleyball
- Football
  - 2-time Class 2A State Champions (1980, 1981)
- Basketball
  - Boys' 1977 Class 2A State Champions
  - Girls' 1972 State Champions
- Wrestling
- Track and Field (boys and girls)
  - Boys' - 4-time State Champions (1949, 1950, 1976, 1977))
- Soccer (boys and girls)
  - Boys' 2000 Class 1A State Champions
- Golf
- Tennis
- Baseball
- Softball
  - 4-time State Champions (1970(su), 1971(su), 1971(f), 1981(f))
