= Granger, Iowa =

- City
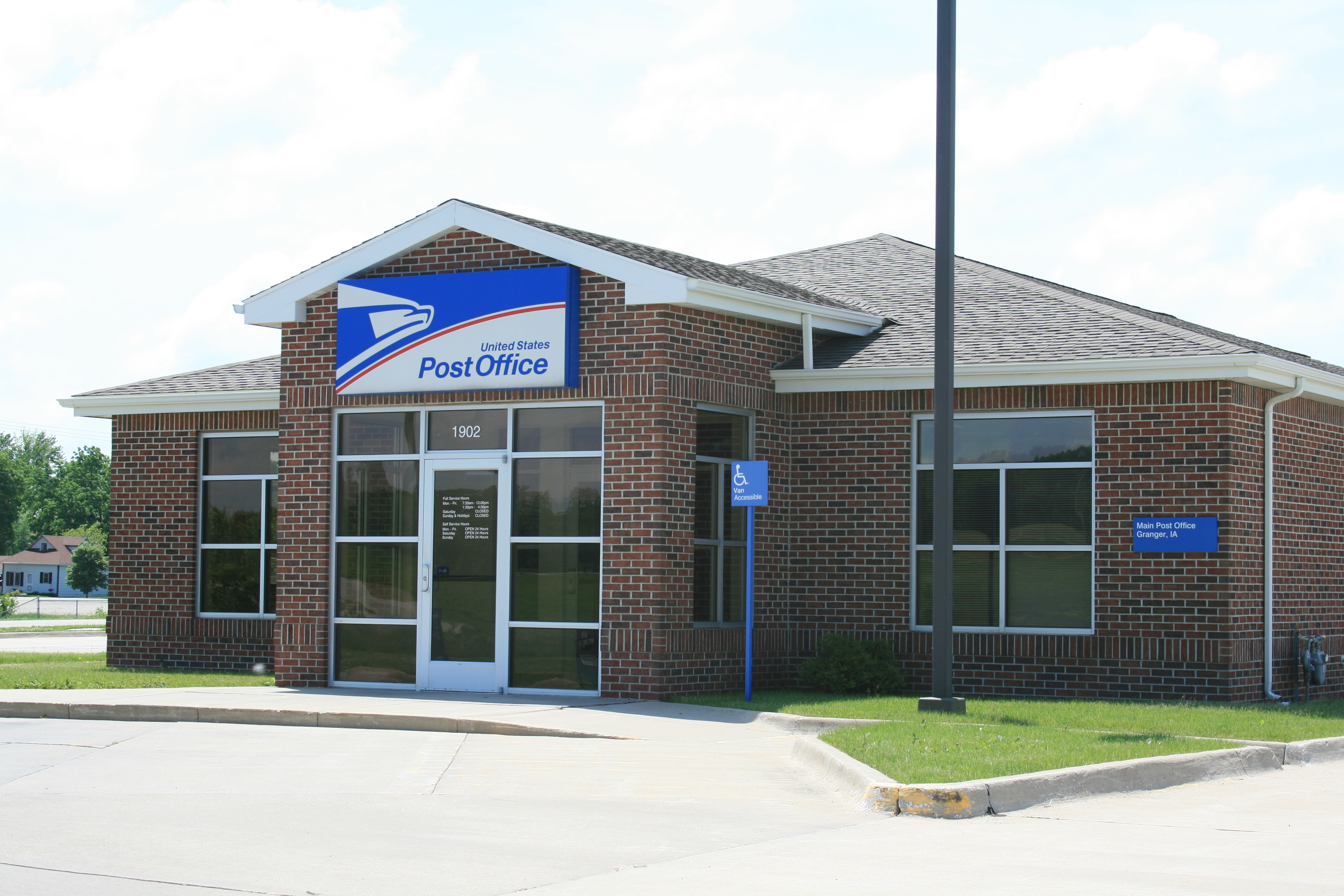
- Granger Post Office

- Location of Granger, Iowa
- Coordinates: 41°45′12″N 93°49′23″W
- Country: United States
- State: Iowa
- Counties: Dallas, Polk
- Townships: Grant, Jefferson
- Incorporated: September 6, 1905

Area
  - Total: 1.67 sq mi (4.32 km^{2})
  - Land: 1.67 sq mi (4.32 km^{2})
  - Water: 0 sq mi (0.00 km^{2})
- Elevation: 892 ft (272 m)

Population (2020)
  - Total: 1,654
  - Density: 991.5/sq mi (382.83/km^{2})
- Time zone: UTC-6 (Central (CST))
  - Summer (DST): UTC-5 (CDT)
- ZIP code: 50109
- Area code: 515
- FIPS code: 19-32160
- GNIS feature ID: 2394960
- Website: www.grangeriowa.org

Granger is a city in Dallas and Polk counties in the U.S. state of Iowa. The population was 1,654 at the time of the 2020 census, up 184% from 583 in 2000. It is part of the Des Moines–West Des Moines Metropolitan Statistical Area.

== History ==
Granger was incorporated as a city on September 6, 1905.

== Geography ==
According to the United States Census Bureau, the city has a total area of 1.45 square miles (3.76 km^{2}), all land. Beaver Creek flows near the town site.

== Demographics ==
Historical populations
Year	Pop.	±%
1910	225	—
1920	324	+44.0%
1930	319	−1.5%
1940	324	+1.6%
1950	300	−7.4%
1960	468	+56.0%
1970	661	+41.2%
1980	619	−6.4%
1990	624	+0.8%
2000	583	−6.6%
2010	1,244	+113.4%
2020	1,654	+33.0%
Source:"U.S. Census website". United States Census Bureau. and Iowa Data Center; Source: U.S. Decennial Census

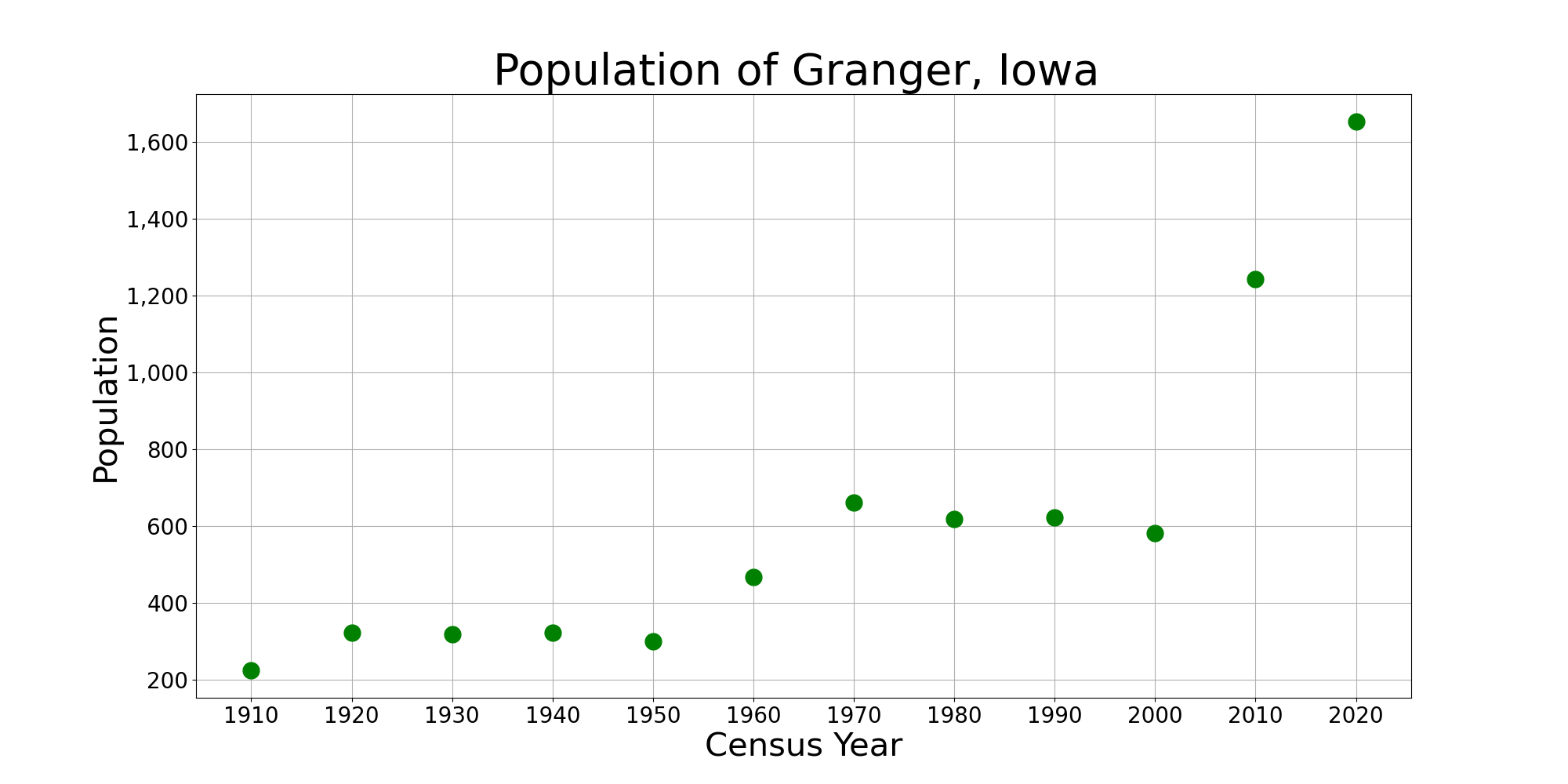
The population of Granger, Iowa from US census data

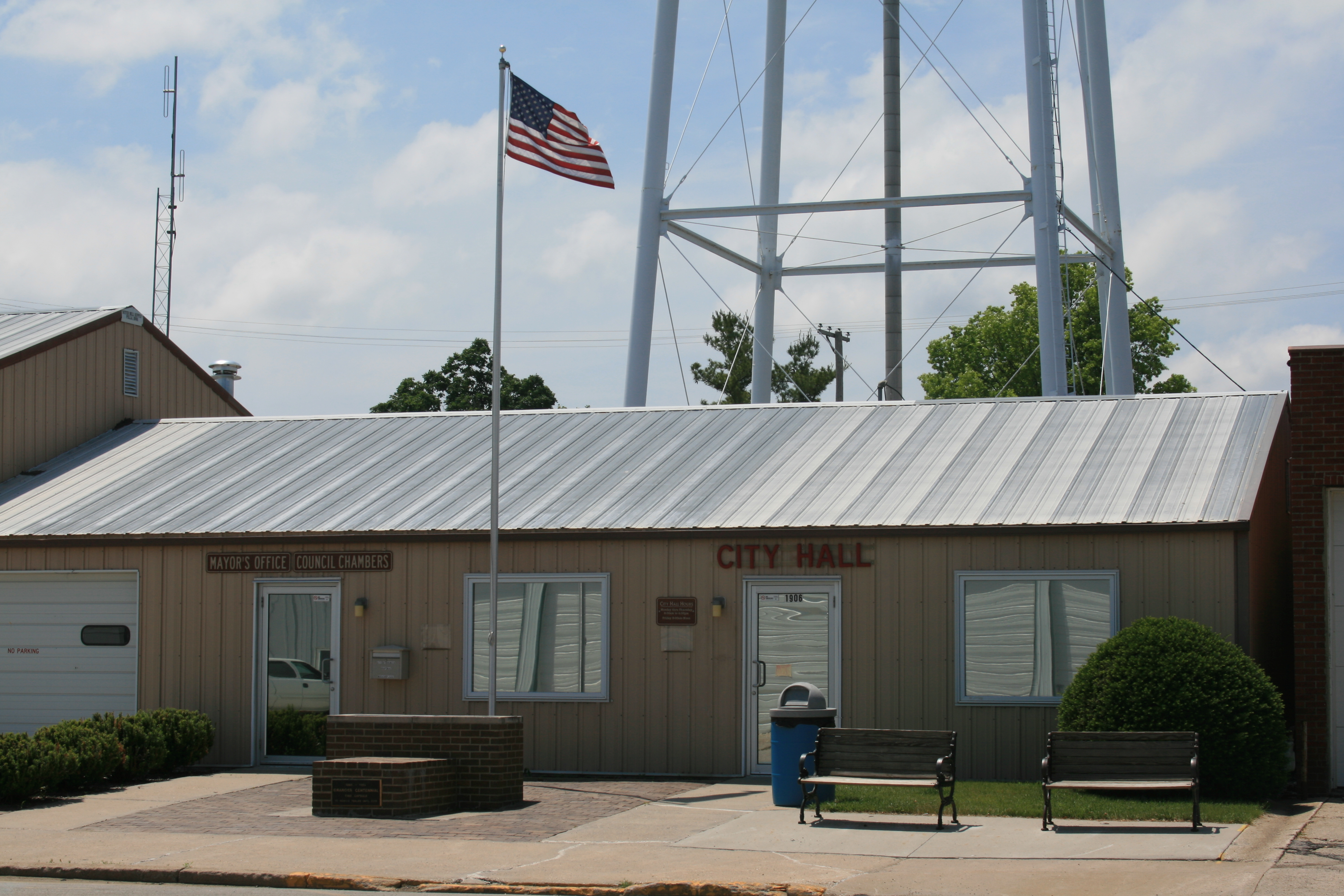
Granger City Hall

=== 2020 census ===
As of the 2020 census, there were 1,654 people, 594 households, and 454 families residing in the city. The population density was 991.5 inhabitants per square mile (382.8/km^{2}). There were 649 housing units at an average density of 389.1 per square mile (150.2/km^{2}).

0.0% of residents lived in urban areas, while 100.0% lived in rural areas.

The median age was 33.8 years. 31.9% of residents were under the age of 18 and 9.3% were 65 years of age or older. 3.7% were between the ages of 20 and 24; 33.4% were from 25 to 44; and 20.4% were from 45 to 64. For every 100 females there were 102.2 males, and for every 100 females age 18 and over there were 104.2 males age 18 and over.

Of the 594 households, 48.5% had children under the age of 18 living with them. 63.3% were married-couple households, 6.2% were cohabiting couple households, 15.3% were households with a male householder and no spouse or partner present, and 15.2% were households with a female householder and no spouse or partner present. 23.6% of households were non-families. 20.1% of all households were made up of individuals, and 6.8% had someone living alone who was 65 years of age or older.

There were 649 housing units, of which 8.5% were vacant. The homeowner vacancy rate was 5.4% and the rental vacancy rate was 11.5%.

Racial composition as of the 2020 census
Race	Number	Percent
White	1,555	94.0%
Black or African American	4	0.2%
American Indian and Alaska Native	5	0.3%
Asian	10	0.6%
Native Hawaiian and Other Pacific Islander	0	0.0%
Some other race	17	1.0%
Two or more races	63	3.8%
Hispanic or Latino (of any race)	59	3.6%

=== 2010 census ===
As of the census of 2010, there were 1,244 people, 461 households, and 330 families living in the city. The population density was 857.9 inhabitants per square mile (331.2/km^{2}). There were 490 housing units at an average density of 337.9 per square mile (130.5/km^{2}). The racial makeup of the city was 98.5% White, 0.3% African American, 0.4% Asian, 0.2% from other races, and 0.6% from two or more races. Hispanic or Latino of any race were 1.5% of the population.

There were 461 households, of which 44.3% had children under the age of 18 living with them, 55.7% were married couples living together, 11.5% had a female householder with no husband present, 4.3% had a male householder with no wife present, and 28.4% were non-families. 22.1% of all households were made up of individuals, and 6.3% had someone living alone who was 65 years of age or older. The average household size was 2.59 and the average family size was 3.06.

The median age in the city was 32 years. 30.2% of residents were under the age of 18; 5.7% were between the ages of 18 and 24; 34.7% were from 25 to 44; 17.7% were from 45 to 64, and 11.5% were 65 years of age or older. The gender makeup of the city was 50.1% male and 49.9% female.

=== 2000 census ===
As of the census of 2000, there were 583 people, 245 households, and 150 families living in the city. The population density was 1,136.6 inhabitants per square mile (438.8/km^{2}). There were 265 housing units at an average density of 516.6 per square mile (199.5/km^{2}). The racial makeup of the city was 98.63% White, 0.17% African American, 0.86% Asian, 0.34% from other races. Hispanic or Latino of any race were 0.51% of the population.

There were 245 households, out of which 26.5% had children under the age of 18 living with them, 48.2% were married couples living together, 8.2% had a female householder with no husband present, and 38.4% were non-families. 35.9% of all households were made up of individuals, and 10.2% had someone living alone who was 65 years of age or older. The average household size was 2.18 and the average family size was 2.85.

21.4% are under the age of 18, 8.7% from 18 to 24, 26.9% from 25 to 44, 21.8% from 45 to 64, and 21.1% who were 65 years of age or older. The median age was 40 years. For every 100 females, there were 99.0 males. For every 100 females age 18 and over, there were 92.4 males.

The median income for a household in the city was $31,442, and the median income for a family was $47,750. Males had a median income of $34,125 versus $23,750 for females. The per capita income for the city was $19,110. About 2.8% of families and 5.2% of the population were below the poverty line, including 2.7% of those under age 18 and 8.0% of those age 65 or over.

== Arts and culture ==
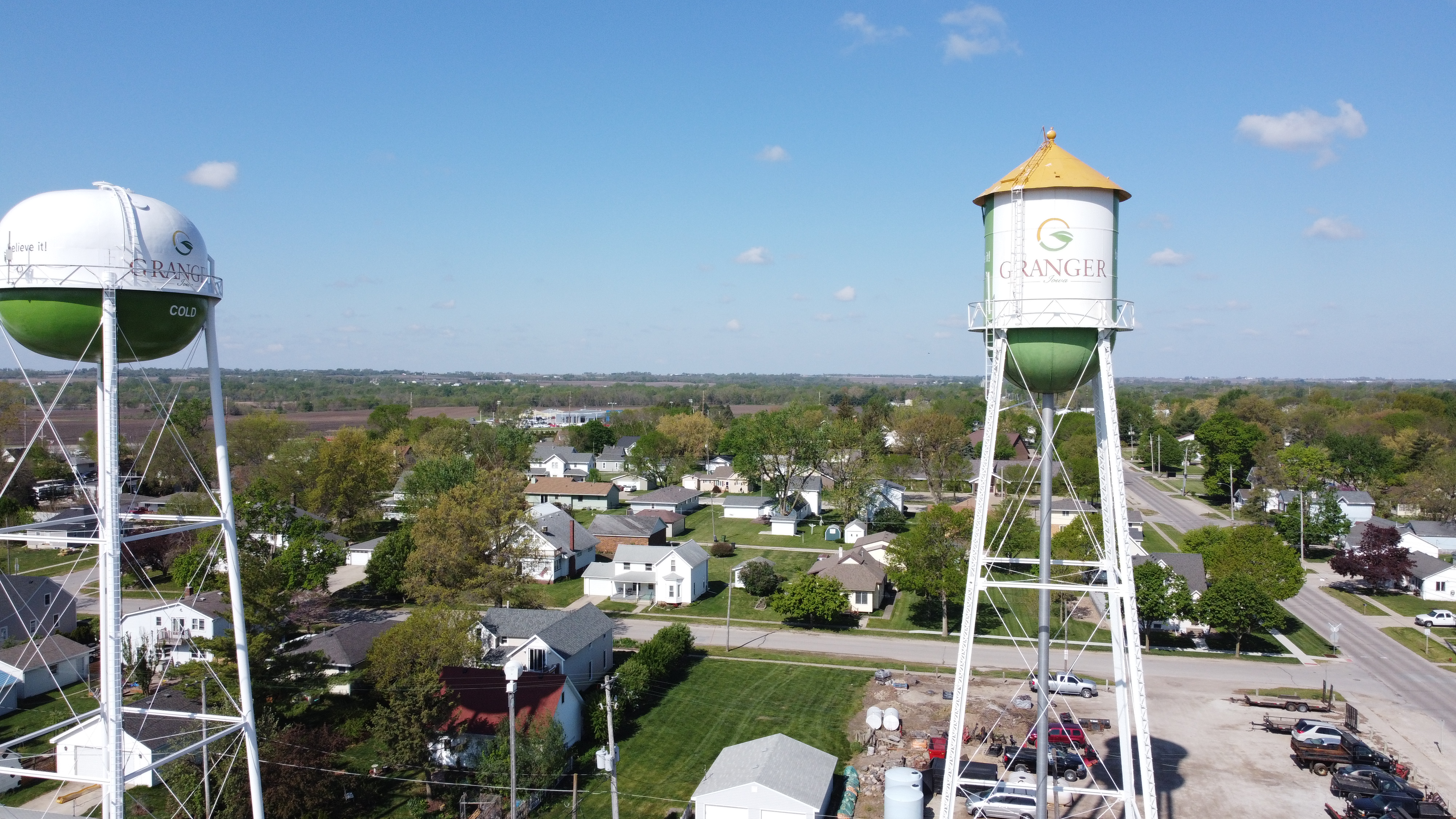
water towers

Granger has three water towers, the two older towers are labeled hot and cold.

== Education ==
The Woodward-Granger Community School District serves most of the children in Granger, but the Johnston Community School District also serves a section of Granger.

The nearest Catholic school of the Roman Catholic Diocese of Des Moines is St. Pius X School in Urbandale. The diocese formerly operated Assumption Catholic School in Granger. Circa 2013 it had about 82-92 students. In 2016 that was down to 62. In addition to the enrollment drop, the school's expenses grew. The school closed in 2016. The area Catholic high school is Dowling Catholic High School in West Des Moines.
