= Johnston Community School District =

Public school district in Johnston, Iowa, United States

Coordinates: 41.662741°N 93.698324°W

Location
- Johnston, Iowa Polk County United States
- Coordinates: 41.662741, -93.698324

District information
- Type: Local school district
- Grades: K-12
- Established: 1914
- Superintendent: Nikki Roorda
- Schools: 9
- Budget: $120,011,000 (2020-21)
- NCES District ID: 1915450

Students and staff
- Students: 7,487
- Teachers: 453.36 FTE
- Staff: 478.31 FTE
- Student–teacher ratio: 16.51
- Athletic conference: Central Iowa Metro League
- Colors: Yellow and Purple

Other information
- Website: www.johnstoncsd.org

Johnston Community School District (JCSD) is a school district headquartered in Johnston, Iowa. In 2023, Nikki Roorda became the superintendent.

The district, with 40 square miles (100 km^{2}), is located in Polk County. It serves Johnston and portions of Des Moines, Granger, Grimes, and Urbandale. Camp Dodge is in the district boundary.

== Schools ==
Secondary schools:

- Johnston High School
- Johnston Middle School
- Summit Middle School

Elementary schools:

- Beaver Creek Elementary School
- Horizon Elementary School
- Lawson Elementary School
- Timber Ridge Elementary School
- Wallace Elementary School

Preschool:

- Johnston Early Learning Academy

== See also ==
- List of school districts in Iowa
