= Webster Township, Polk County, Iowa =

Township in Polk County, Iowa, U.S.

Coordinates: 41.656°N 93.745°W

Webster Township is a township in Polk County, Iowa, United States.

== History ==
Webster Township was established in 1878.
