= Grant Township, Dallas County, Iowa =

Grant Township
- Township
- Location in Dallas County
- Coordinates: 41°44′17″N 093°51′30″W
- Country: United States
- State: Iowa
- County: Dallas

Area
  - Total: 36.85 sq mi (95.45 km^{2})
  - Land: 36.85 sq mi (95.43 km^{2})
  - Water: 0.0077 sq mi (0.02 km^{2}) 0.02%
- Elevation: 965 ft (294 m)

Population (2000)
  - Total: 1,368
  - Density: 37/sq mi (14.3/km^{2})
- GNIS feature ID: 0467936

Grant Township is a township in Dallas County, Iowa, United States. As of the 2000 census, its population was 1,368.

== Geography ==
Grant Township covers an area of 36.85 square miles (95.4 km^{2}) and contains one incorporated settlement, Granger. According to the USGS, it contains one cemetery, Beaver.

The stream of Royer Creek runs through this township.
