= Monroe, Iowa =

- City
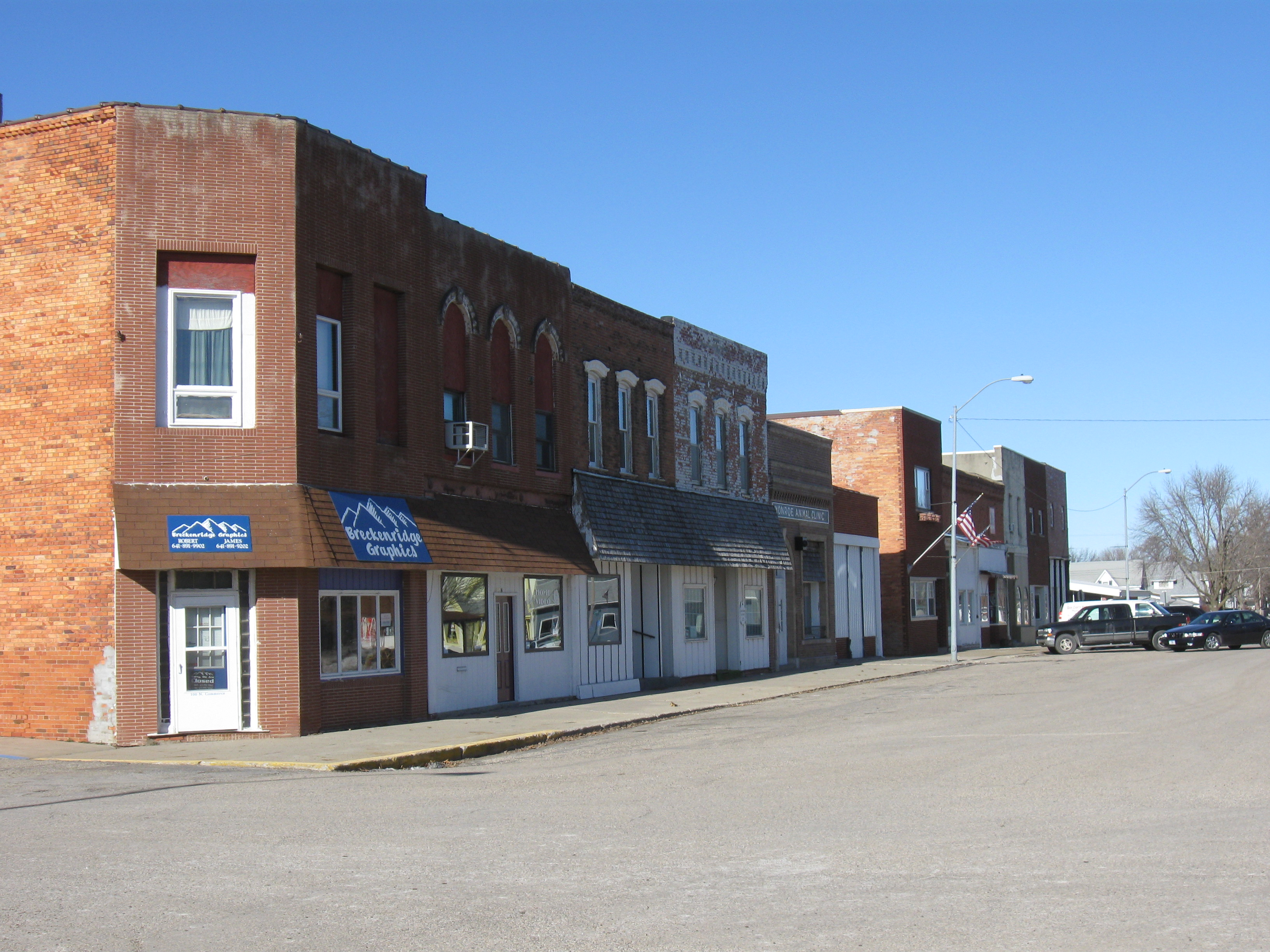
- Downtown Monroe

- Location of Monroe, Iowa
- Coordinates: 41°31′19″N 93°6′13″W
- Country: United States
- State: Iowa
- County: Jasper

Government
  - Mayor: Doug Duinink

Area
  - Total: 1.70 sq mi (4.40 km^{2})
  - Land: 1.70 sq mi (4.40 km^{2})
  - Water: 0 sq mi (0.00 km^{2})
- Elevation: 925 ft (282 m)

Population (2020)
  - Total: 1,967
  - Density: 1,158.7/sq mi (447.39/km^{2})
- Time zone: UTC-6 (Central (CST))
  - Summer (DST): UTC-5 (CDT)
- ZIP code: 50170
- Area code: 641
- FIPS code: 19-53355
- GNIS feature ID: 0459177
- Website: monroeia.com

Monroe is a city in Jasper and Marion counties in Iowa, United States. The population was 1,967 at the time of the 2020 census.

== History ==
Monroe was laid out in 1851 by Adam Tool and was originally called Tool's Point. The name was soon changed to Monroe."Tool's point" is now the name of a park located in the city.

== Geography ==
Monroe's longitude and latitude coordinates in decimal form are 41.521880, -93.103492.

According to the United States Census Bureau, the city has a total area of 1.69 square miles (4.38 km^{2}), all land.

== Demographics ==
Historical populations
Year	Pop.	±%
1880	982	—
1890	952	−3.1%
1900	917	−3.7%
1910	800	−12.8%
1920	936	+17.0%
1930	936	+0.0%
1940	1,015	+8.4%
1950	1,108	+9.2%
1960	1,366	+23.3%
1970	1,389	+1.7%
1980	1,875	+35.0%
1990	1,739	−7.3%
2000	1,808	+4.0%
2010	1,830	+1.2%
2020	1,967	+7.5%
Source:"U.S. Census website". United States Census Bureau. and Iowa Data Center; Source: U.S. Decennial Census

=== 2020 census ===
As of the 2020 census, Monroe had a population of 1,967, with 819 households and 534 families residing in the city. The population density was 1,158.7 inhabitants per square mile (447.4/km^{2}). There were 857 housing units at an average density of 504.8 per square mile (194.9/km^{2}).

Racial composition as of the 2020 census
Race	Number	Percent
White	1,887	95.9%
Black or African American	4	0.2%
American Indian and Alaska Native	6	0.3%
Asian	6	0.3%
Native Hawaiian and Other Pacific Islander	1	0.1%
Some other race	9	0.5%
Two or more races	54	2.7%
Hispanic or Latino (of any race)	24	1.2%

Of households in Monroe, 31.0% had children under the age of 18 living in them. Of all households, 51.2% were married-couple households, 7.2% were cohabitating-couple households, 17.9% were households with a male householder and no spouse or partner present, and 23.7% were households with a female householder and no spouse or partner present. About 34.8% of households were non-families, 29.1% were made up of individuals, and 12.3% had someone living alone who was 65 years of age or older.

Of housing units, 4.4% were vacant. The homeowner vacancy rate was 1.3% and the rental vacancy rate was 4.5%. 0.0% of residents lived in urban areas, while 100.0% lived in rural areas.

The median age was 39.0 years. 25.0% of residents were under the age of 18 and 17.6% were 65 years of age or older. 27.4% of residents were under the age of 20; 4.2% were between the ages of 20 and 24; 25.8% were from 25 to 44; and 25.0% were from 45 to 64. The gender makeup of the city was 51.0% male and 49.0% female. For every 100 females there were 104.0 males, and for every 100 females age 18 and over there were 97.1 males age 18 and over.

=== 2010 census ===
As of the census of 2010, there were 1,830 people, 770 households, and 527 families living in the city. The population density was 1,082.8 inhabitants per square mile (418.1/km^{2}). There were 839 housing units at an average density of 496.4 per square mile (191.7/km^{2}). The racial makeup of the city was 98.7% White, 0.3% African American, 0.1% Native American, 0.5% Asian, 0.1% from other races, and 0.3% from two or more races. Hispanic or Latino of any race were 0.6% of the population.

There were 770 households, of which 31.8% had children under the age of 18 living with them, 55.8% were married couples living together, 7.4% had a female householder with no husband present, 5.2% had a male householder with no wife present, and 31.6% were non-families. 26.6% of all households were made up of individuals, and 10.8% had someone living alone who was 65 years of age or older. The average household size was 2.38 and the average family size was 2.87.

The median age in the city was 38.6 years. 24.4% of residents were under the age of 18; 7.7% were between the ages of 18 and 24; 26.4% were from 25 to 44; 25.5% were from 45 to 64; and 16.2% were 65 years of age or older. The gender makeup of the city was 49.9% male and 50.1% female.

=== 2000 census ===
As of the census of 2000, there were 1,808 people, 753 households, and 521 families living in the city. The population density was 1,067.6 inhabitants per square mile (412.2/km^{2}). There were 802 housing units at an average density of 473.6 per square mile (182.9/km^{2}). The racial makeup of the city was 98.12% White, 0.17% African American, 0.22% Native American, 0.44% Asian, 0.33% from other races, and 0.72% from two or more races. Hispanic or Latino of any race were 0.77% of the population.

There were 753 households, out of which 33.1% had children under the age of 18 living with them, 57.6% were married couples living together, 8.2% had a female householder with no husband present, and 30.7% were non-families. 27.1% of all households were made up of individuals, and 12.9% had someone living alone who was 65 years of age or older. The average household size was 2.40 and the average family size was 2.91.

26.3% are under the age of 18, 8.3% from 18 to 24, 27.4% from 25 to 44, 23.5% from 45 to 64, and 14.5% who were 65 years of age or older. The median age was 37 years. For every 100 females, there were 92.5 males. For every 100 females age 18 and over, there were 87.3 males.

The median income for a household in the city was $39,837, and the median income for a family was $50,819. Males had a median income of $33,679 versus $25,256 for females. The per capita income for the city was $18,518. About 3.1% of families and 5.6% of the population were below the poverty line, including 4.9% of those under age 18 and 7.8% of those age 65 or over.

== Education ==
The PCM Community School District operates public schools serving the community. It was a part of the Monroe School District, known prior to July 1, 1978 as the New Monroe school district, until it merged with the Prairie City district into PCM on July 1, 1991. Monroe is home to Monroe Elementary School and PCM Community High School while the middle school is in Prairie City.

== Notable people ==
- Bucky O'Connor (1913–1958), head coach of the Iowa Hawkeyes men's basketball team from 1949 to 1958
- Bonnie Lucas (1956-), radio personality

== See also ==
- Elk Rock State Park
- Iowa Highway 14
- Iowa Highway 163
