= Ankeny =

Ankeny may refer to:

== Places in the United States ==
- Ankeny, Iowa, a city
- Ankeny, Washington, a ghost town
- Ankeny National Wildlife Refuge, a wildlife refuge in Oregon
- Ankeny Building, a historic building in Clinton County, Iowa

== Other uses ==
- Ankeny v. Governor of the State of Indiana, a court case challenging Barack Obama's eligibility to run for president
- Ankeny (surname)
