= Iowa Wing Civil Air Patrol =

Highest echelon of the Civil Air Patrol in Iowa, United States

- Iowa Wing of Civil Air Patrol

Associated branches
- United States Air Force

Command staff
- Commander: Col Michael McClanahan
- Deputy Commander: Maj James McLaughlin
- Chief of Staff: Maj Alexander Paul

Current statistics
- Cadets: 156
- Seniors: 205
- Total Membership: 361
- Website: iawg.cap.gov
- Statistics as of 2022

The Iowa Wing of Civil Air Patrol (CAP) is the highest echelon of Civil Air Patrol in the state of Iowa and is part of CAP's North Central Region. The Iowa Wing headquarters is located in West Des Moines, Iowa. The Iowa Wing consists of over 360 cadet and adult members at 9 locations across the state of Iowa. They operate a total of 7 single-engine aircraft and 1 glider, which flew a total of 975 flight hours in 2022.

== Mission ==
The Iowa Wing performs the three missions of Civil Air Patrol: providing emergency services; providing a cadet program for youth; and offering aerospace education for both CAP members and the general public.

=== Emergency services ===
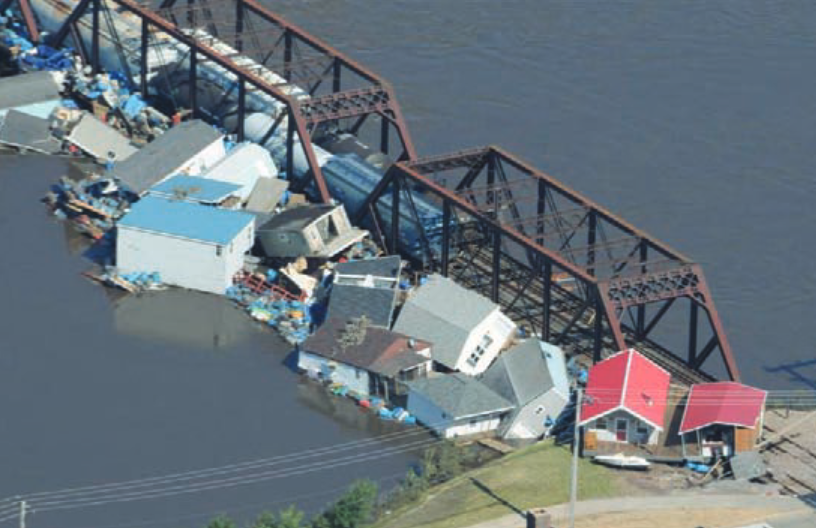
Image taken by the Iowa Wing of homes pushed against a railroad bridge in Cedar Rapids, Iowa after the Iowa Flood of 2008.

Civil Air Patrol conducts emergency service missions, including: inland search and rescue missions, disaster relief missions including aerial surveillance missions, and air evacuation of the sick and injured. Civil Air Patrol maintains a network of radio stations to maintain communications during an emergency. Civil Air Patrol has also conducted homeland security missions by providing airborne reconnaissance of critical infrastructure.

==== Notable Emergency Services Missions ====
In June 1942, a squadron located in Sioux City, Iowa warned local residents of a coming flood, due to rising waters in the Missouri River, by painting "FLOOD" on the bottom of their aircraft and flying overhead.

In June 2008, the Iowa Wing provided aerial surveillance in the aftermath of the Iowa flood of 2008, where 80 of Iowa's 99 counties were federally declared disaster areas due to the extent of the damage. The Iowa Wing conducted 16 sorties, totaling 31.6 flight hours, supporting the Iowa Department of Homeland Security and Emergency Management Division and the National Weather Service. The Wing gathered approximately 1,800 aerial photographs of the damage caused by the flood. They notably flew then-Iowa U.S. Senator Tom Harkin (D) and Iowa U.S. Senator Chuck Grassley (R) on survey missions over: Ankeny, Mason City, Charles City, Nashua, Waverly, and Des Moines. Then-Iowa U.S. Representative Steve King (R) also participated in a CAP aerial survey mission with the Iowa Wing.

In August 2020, the Iowa Wing provided aerial surveillance in the aftermath of the August 2020 Midwest derecho. The derecho severely damaged several parts of Iowa, most notably Cedar Rapids. Starting on 14 August, over the course of 36 hours, the CAP Wings of: Iowa, Kansas, and Illinois conducted 37 sorties and gathered approximately 3,500 aerial photographs of the damage caused by the derecho.

In March 2022, the Iowa Wing provided disaster relief in the aftermath of an EF-4 tornado touching down in Madison County, Iowa. Iowa Governor Kim Reynolds issued a state disaster declaration for Madison County. The disaster resulted in 6 deaths and was the costliest tornado in the United States in 2022, with $220 million in damages.

In May 2022, the Iowa Wing, along with the Michigan Wing, Missouri Wing, and Minnesota Wing, took part in a wing-wide search and rescue exercise (SAREX) at Iowa City Airport. The exercise involved aircrew, ground teams, and drone teams and was conducted in conjunction with the Johnson County emergency management director.

In December 2022, the Iowa Wing was recognized for its participation in Operation Pulse Lift, CAP's humanitarian blood-donation mission in twelve states; launched to assist the American Red Cross in response to the COVID-19 pandemic. By 13 December 2022, Operation Pulse Lift had lasted 1,000 days and had resulted in the collection and transport of 17,416 units of blood by CAP.

=== Cadet programs ===
Civil Air Patrol offers a cadet program which provides leadership training, technical education, scholarships and career education to youth aged 12 to 21. The program includes CAP encampments and access to glider and powered aircraft flights. The Iowa Wing encampment is generally held in the summer at Camp Dodge in Johnston. The North Central Region Encampment has also historically been held at Camp Dodge.

Iowa Wing cadets also participate in National Wreaths Across America Day, an annual nationwide event in December for placing wreaths on veteran's graves in military cemeteries.

==== Notable Iowa Wing Cadet Program Accomplishments ====
In December 2021, the Osage Flight of the Iowa Wing won the All Divisions 1st Place State Award, Gold Tier, in the 14th National Cyber Patriot Competition, a cyber defense competition held annually by the Air & Space Forces Association where the Civil Air Patrol, Junior Reserve Officer Training Corps, and United States Naval Sea Cadet Corps compete.

=== Aerospace education ===
Civil Air Patrol provides aerospace education to both its members and the general public. Teachers may receive educational materials through the CAP's Aerospace Education Membership program.

== History ==
=== World War Two ===
The Iowa Wing was established on 1 December 1941, as part of the newly formed Civil Air Patrol. Six days later, after the Attack on Pearl Harbor, it was called into service to support the home-front following the start of American involvement in World War Two. By 27 January 1942, the Iowa Wing had 575 members.

Missions involved surveying fields in Iowa for abandoned tractors and scrap piles that could be repurposed, along with simulating bombing runs on maneuvering ground troops using quarter pound bags of flour with the then-active Iowa State Guard. Scrap survey missions also involved letter dropping campaigns in order to garner local support and donations of scrap, which are noted in historical documents to have had considerably positive results in Iowa. Simulations of bombing runs using bags of flour are also noted to have drawn large crowds of spectating locals.

The Iowa Wing was also involved in anti-saboteur exercises for local authorities. This included conducting air interception drills, red teaming, and assisting authorities with inspections on explosives storage.

== Organization ==
The Iowa Wing does not utilize CAP's optional "Group" structure. Instead, all squadrons report to the Iowa Wing directly.

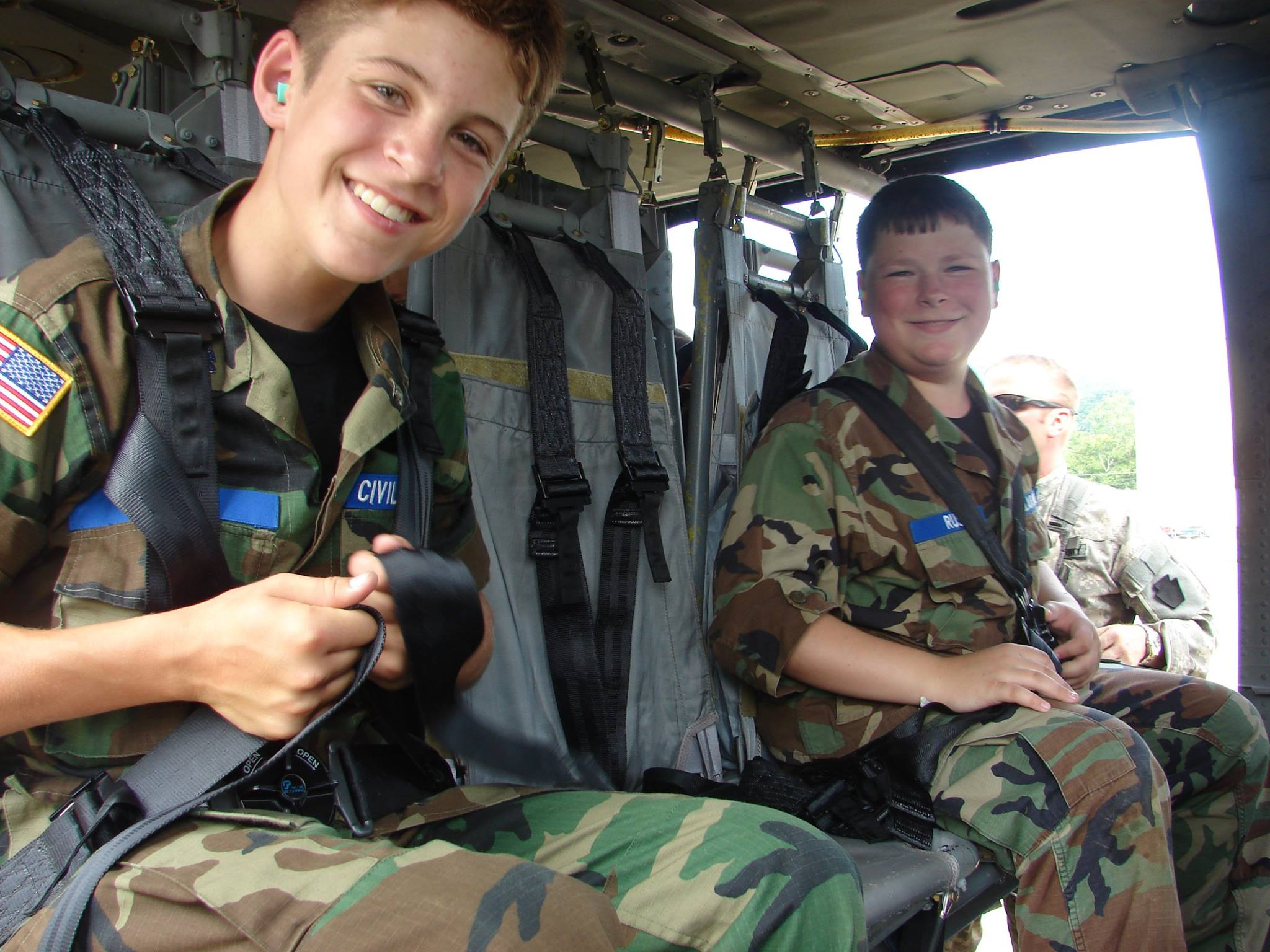
Civil Air Patrol members frequently have the opportunity to visit Air Force facilities and experience flights in the service branch's planes and helicopters.

Active Squadrons of the Iowa Wing
Designation	Squadron Name	Location	Notes
NCR-IA-001	Iowa Wing Headquarters	West Des Moines	Active 1942–Present
NCR-IA-002	Des Moines Composite Squadron	Des Moines	Active 1942–Present
NCR-IA-003	Southwest Iowa Composite Squadron	Atlantic	Previously known as the Red Oak Optimist Composite Squadron Active 2010–Present
NCR-IA-004	Black Hawk County Composite Squadron	Waterloo	Previously known as the Waterloo Composite Squadron & Black Hawk Composite Squadron. Active 1942–2005; 2020–Present
NCR-IA-005	Burlington Flight	Burlington	Previously known as the Burlington Composite Squadron. Active 1942-???; 2020–Present
NCR-IA-041	Davenport Composite Squadron	Davenport	Active 1942–Present
NCR-IA-043	Dubuque Composite Squadron	Dubuque	Active 1942–1983; 1993-Present
NCR-IA-129	Cedar Rapids Composite Squadron	Cedar Rapids	Split into East Iowa Cadet Squadron and Cedar Rapids Senior Squadron in 1976. Those two units were then merged back into a Composite Squadron in 2012. Active 1942–1976; 2012–Present
NCR-IA-130	Osage Flight	Osage	Active 2020–Present
NCR-IA-999	Iowa State Legislative Squadron	Des Moines	Active 1942–Present

=== Former Units ===
Charter numbers were not assigned to squadrons in CAP until 1955. Prior to 1955, units used numbers based on Region, Wing, and Group. Iowa was the second Wing under the seventh Region. Groups were the third number and squadrons were assigned a number after the hyphen. Flights did not receive their own unit numbers. Instead, flights acted as detachments of squadrons who held unit numbers. Squadrons sometimes moved locations without changing their unit number. Other times, unit numbers were reused following a previous unit with the same squadron number being deactivated. Some of these units may have continued under different names after being assigned individual charter numbers after 1955.

Former Squadrons of the Iowa Wing Before 1955
Squadron Number	Known Locations	Known Flights	Known Active Years
Squadron 721-1	Des Moines	A flight in Decorah was attached to this unit.	Activated 1942
Squadron 721-3	Council Bluffs; Clinton; Clarinda; Clarion	A flight in Clermont & a flight in Washington were attached to this unit.	Activated 1942, 1943, 1949, & 1951
Squadron 721-4	Ottumwa; Pella; Red Oak	-	Activated 1942, 1943
Squadron 722-1	Cedar Rapids; Chariton	-	Activated 1942, 1945
Squadron 722-2	Oxford	-	Activated 1942
Squadron 722-6	Washington	A flight in Morning Sun was attached to this unit	Activated 1942
Squadron 723-?	Ames; Battle Creek	-	Activated 1942, 1952
Squadron 723-?	Sioux City; Storm Lake; Traer	-	Activated 1942, 1946, 1951
Squadron 723-2	Mason City	-	Activated 1942
Squadron 723-3	Fort Dodge; Guthrie Center; Galena, Illinois; Harlan	-	Activated 1942, 1943, 1651, 1954
Squadron 723-8	Sheldon; Sac City; Spencer	A flight in Rock Rapids (1946) & a flight in Orange City (1943) were attached to this unit.	Activated 1943.
Squadron 723-14	Boone; Burlington; Carroll	-	Activated 1942, 1943
Squadron 724-?	Independence; Iowa City; Iowa Falls	-	Activated 1943, 1945
Squadron 724-1	Waterloo	A flight in Wesley was attached to this unit.	Activated 1942
Squadron 724-2	Dubuque	A flight in Estherville (1942) & a flight in Dyersville (1943) were attached to this unit.	Activated 1942
Squadron 724-3	Marion	-	Activated 1942
Squadron 724-4	Marshalltown	-	Activated 1942
Squadron 724-6	Oelwein	-	Activated 1943
Squadron 724-8	Cedar Falls	-	Activated 1943
Squadron 725-1	Davenport	-	Activated 1942
Squadron 725-2	Muscatine; Oakland	-	Activated 1942, 1949
Squadron 725-3 (All-Girls Squadron)	Davenport	-	Activated 1945
Squadron 725-6	Jefferson; Le Mars	A flight in Manchester (1953) was attached to this unit.	Activated 1942, 1943

Former Squadrons of the Iowa Wing After 1955
Designation	Squadron Name	Location	Notes
NCR-IA-007	Northwest Iowa Composite Squadron	Fort Dodge	Active 2004 - sometime after 2014
NCR-IA-029	Ottumwa Composite Squadron	Ottumwa	Active 1942 - 1982
NCR-IA-032	Iowa Group II Headquarters	???	Active ???-???
NCR-IA-033	Iowa Group III Headquarters	???	Active ???-???
NCR-IA-033	Sheldon Composite Squadron	Sheldon	Active 2008-2010 (Reused Charter Number from Former Iowa Group III HQ)
NCR-IA-035	Iowa Group IV Headquarters	???	Active ???-1970
NCR-IA-044	Sioux City Composite Squadron	Sioux City	Active 1942-1971
NCR-IA-048	Maquoketa Composite Squadron	Maquoketa	Active ???-1971
NCR-IA-049	Des Moines Senior Squadron	Des Moines	Active ???-1970
NCR-IA-051	Cedar Rapids Senior Squadron	Cedar Rapids	Active 1976-2012
NCR-IA-052	Ames Composite Squadron	Ames	Active 1942-1973
NCR-IA-053	Iowa City Composite Squadron	Iowa City	Active 1973-1980
NCR-IA-057	Council Bluffs Cadet Squadron	Council Bluffs	Active 1953-1973
NCR-IA-058	Burke Composite Squadron	Atlantic	Previously known as the Atlantic Composite Squadron Active ???-???
NCR-IA-062	Ankeny Composite Squadron	Ankeny	Active ???-1970
NCR-IA-063	Carter Lake Composite Squadron	Carter Lake	Active ???-1970
NCR-IA-064	Delaware County Composite Squadron	???	Active ???-???
NCR-IA-065	Ames-Boone Composite Squadron	Boone	Previously known as the Boone Composite Squadron Active 1969-1984
NCR-IA-066	Morning Sun Composite Squadron	Morning Sun	Active 1970-1975
NCR-IA-067	Estherville Composite Squadron	Estherville	Previously known as the Iowa Lakes Composite Squadron Active 1971-1997
NCR-IA-068	Muscatine Composite Squadron	Muscatine	Active 1971-???
NCR-IA-069	Council Bluffs Composite Squadron	Council Bluffs	Active 1971-???
NCR-IA-070	Fairfield Composite Squadron	Fairfield	Active 1971-???
NCR-IA-071	Webster City Composite Squadron	Webster City	Active 1972-???
NCR-IA-072	Group IV Headquarters	???	Active 1972-???
NCR-IA-072	Des Moines Metro Cadet Squadron	Des Moines	Reused charter number from Former Group IV HQ. Active 2006-2014
NCR-IA-073	West Iowa Senior Squadron	Audubon	Previously known as Audubon Composite Squadron Active ???-???
NCR-IA-074	Iowa City Senior Squadron	Iowa City	Active 1972-1973
NCR-IA-074	Motor Rescue Squadron	???	Active 1975-1979
NCR-IA-075	Indianola Composite Squadron	Indianola	Active 1976-1980
NCR-IA-076	Sioux City Composite Squadron	Sioux City	Active 1976-1977
NCR-IA-077	Nishna Valley Composite Squadron	???	Active 1975-???
NCR-IA-078	East Iowa Cadet Squadron	Cedar Rapids	Previously known as Cedar Rapids Cadet Squadron Active 1976-2012
NCR-IA-079	North Iowa Composite Squadron	???	Active 1976-1994
NCR-IA-080	Fort Madison Composite Squadron	Fort Madison	Active 1976-???
NCR-IA-081	Burlington Cadet Squadron	Burlington	Previously known as the Hawkeye Cadet Squadron Active 1977-1982
NCR-IA-082	Darrell Lerch Composite Squadron	Anamosa	Also known as the Anamosa Repair Squadron Active 1979-1993
NCR-IA-083	Des Moines Senior Squadron	Des Moines	Active 1984-1998
NCR-IA-084	Northwest Iowa Composite Flight	???	Previously known as Northwest Iowa Composite Squadron Active 1984–1986; 2001-2003
NCR-IA-085	Waverly Composite Squadron	Waverly	Active 1984-1993
NCR-IA-086	Atlantic Trojan Cadet Squadron	Atlantic	Active 1985-???
NCR-IA-087	Southeast Iowa Composite Squadron	Oskaloosa	Active 1986-2003
NCR-IA-088	Siouxland Composite Squadron	???	Active 1988-1990
NCR-IA-088	Buffalo Ridge Composite Squadron	???	Reused charter number from former Siouxland Composite Squadron Previously known as the Sac County Composite Squadron Active 1993-2001
NCR-IA-089	Pocahontas Composite Squadron	Pocahontas	Active 1993-1998
NCR-IA-090	South Central Iowa Composite Flight	???	Previously known as the Decatur County Composite Squadron Active 1998-2002
NCR-IA-091	Central Iowa Composite Squadron	Ames	Active 1999-2008
NCR-IA-092	Washington-Brinton Cadet Squadron	Washington	Active 2001-2006
NCR-IA-103	Hawkeye Composite Squadron	Iowa City	Active 2003-2006
NCR-IA-131	Ames Flight	Ames	Active 2020–2023
NCR-IAR-01	Iowa State University ROTC Squadron	Ames	Active ???-2003
NCR-IAR-02	University of Iowa ROTC Squadron	Iowa City	Active ???-2003

== Aircraft ==
=== Current inventory ===
The Iowa Wing currently possesses 7 powered aircraft, as well as 1 glider and a handful of drones.

Aircraft	Origin	In service
Cessna 172	United States	4
Cessna 182	United States	3

== Accidents ==
On March 13, 1971, A Civil Air Patrol Beechcraft A45 with the tail code N9716Z, assigned to the Iowa Wing, clipped a power-line and crashed while conducting flood surveillance over Boone, Iowa. Investigations found that the pilot-in-command had attempted operation with known deficiencies in equipment. A waiver was issued to release the aircraft for flight with a heavily crazed windshield which, combined with a haze in the area, greatly obstructed the pilot's vision. The pilot, then-Iowa Wing Acting Commander Lt Col Robert A. Graybill, and an unidentified passenger serving as an observer were both fatally injured in the crash.

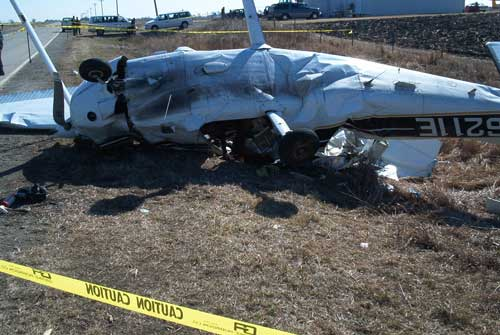
N6211E Wreckage

On March 22, 2003, a Civil Air Patrol Cessna 182R with the tail code N6211E, assigned to the Iowa Wing's Des Moines Composite Squadron, was destroyed during takeoff and climb out from White Pigeon Airport (ICAO 7IA1) near North English, Iowa. The aircraft was on an instructional training flight that started at Ankeny Regional Airport, crewed by Certified Flight Instructor Chaplain (Major) Christie Battle and Private Pilot Second Lieutenant James Johnson. The National Transportation Safety Board reported the cause of the accident was determined to be the pilot's failure to maintain adequate airspeed which resulted in a stall. The instructor's improper decision to attempt to takeoff from a short, grass taxiway instead of departing from a proper runway aligned with the prevailing winds; the short, grass taxiway itself; the crosswind, trees, and transmission wires all contributed to the accident. Maj Battle was pronounced dead at the scene, while 2nd Lt Johnson sustained serious injuries.

== Legal protection ==
Under Title I §29A.43 of the Code of Iowa, employers in Iowa are required to grant a leave of absence to their employees who are members of Civil Air Patrol when these employees are called to fulfill a Civil Air Patrol mission. Employers are forbidden by state law from punishing an employee in any way for being a member of Civil Air Patrol or for taking a leave of absence for a Civil Air Patrol mission. Employers cannot require their employee to use vacation time or sick leave to cover the employee's leave of absence, and may not reduce the employee's bonus or other employment benefits relating to the employee's particular employment.

== List of commanders ==
The Iowa Wing has had 32 wing commanders from 1941 to 2024.

No.	Commander		Term		
No.	Portrait	Name	Took office	Left office	Term length
1	Daniel F. Hunter	Major; Daniel F. Hunter	1 December 1941	2 March 1944	2 years, 92 days
2	Don C. Johnston	Colonel; Don C. Johnston	2 March 1944	20 February 1948	3 years, 355 days
3	Willard O. Fuller	Colonel; Willard O. Fuller	20 February 1948	10 January 1950	1 year, 324 days
4	Harold E. McKinney	Colonel; Harold E. McKinney	10 January 1950	21 December 1955	5 years, 345 days
5	Robert J. Wade	Colonel; Robert J. Wade	21 December 1955	29 May 1958	2 years, 159 days
6	Hal D. Rogers	Colonel; Hal D. Rogers	29 May 1958	17 February 1964	5 years, 264 days
7	Edward J. Whistler	Lieutenant Colonel; Edward J. Whistler	17 February 1964	1 September 1965	1 year, 196 days
8	Allen E. Towne	Colonel; Allen E. Towne	1 September 1965	8 February 1968	2 years, 160 days
9	William B. Cass	Colonel; William B. Cass	8 February 1968	5 December 1970	2 years, 300 days
-	Robert A. Graybill	Lieutenant Colonel; Robert A. Graybill; Acting	5 December 1970	13 March 1971	98 days
10	William R. Gold	Colonel; William R. Gold	13 March 1971	17 May 1972	1 year, 65 days
11	William B. Cass	Colonel; William B. Cass	17 May 1972	1 June 1975	3 years, 15 days
13	Patrica J. Gigstad	Colonel; Patrica J. Gigstad	1 June 1975	22 August 1979	4 years, 82 days
14	Donald M. Bailey	Colonel; Donald M. Bailey	22 August 1979	31 December 1981	2 years, 131 days
15	Evan R. Winters	Lieutenant Colonel; Evan R. Winters	31 December 1981	13 November 1982	317 days
16	James L. Black	Colonel; James L. Black	13 November 1982	9 November 1985	2 years, 361 days
17	Phyllis A. Dolin	Colonel; Phyllis A. Dolin	9 November 1985	22 August 1986	286 days
18	Eugene C. Kellogg	Colonel; Eugene C. Kellogg	5 September 1986	1 July 1988	1 year, 300 days
19	Ramona J. Shaver	Colonel; Ramona J. Shaver	1 July 1988	14 Nov 1992	4 years, 136 days
20	Lawrence D. Toigo	Colonel; Lawrence D. Toigo	14 Nov 1992	23 November 1996	4 years, 9 days
21	Sheila J. Waldorf	Colonel; Sheila J. Waldorf	23 November 1996	15 August 1998	1 year, 265 days
23	John F. Lalla	Colonel; John F. Lalla	15 August 1998	1 January 2000	1 year, 139 days
24	Rex E. Glasgow	Colonel; Rex E. Glasgow	1 January 2000	15 June 2002	2 years, 165 days
25	Russell E. Smith	Colonel; Russell E. Smith	15 June 2002	12 November 2003	1 year, 150 days
-	Gerald P. Lowry	Major; Gerald P. Lowry; Acting	12 November 2003	19 January 2004	68 days
26	Ralph F. Tomlinson	Colonel; Ralph F. Tomlinson	19 January 2004	26 January 2008	4 years, 7 days
27	Ronald S. Scheitzach	Colonel; Ronald S. Scheitzach	26 January 2008	12 January 2013	4 years, 352 days
28	Michael Mouw	Colonel; Michael Mouw	12 January 2013	4 September 2014	1 year, 235 days
29	Anita S. Elliot	Colonel; Anita S. Elliot	4 September 2014	13 November 2017	3 years, 70 days
-	Ron Mutchler	Major; Ron Mutchler; Acting	13 November 2017	7 April 2018	145 days
30	Joseph M. Hackett	Colonel; Joseph M. Hackett	7 April 2018	25 May 2020	2 years, 48 days
31	Jonathan W. Lartigue	Colonel; Jonathan W. Lartigue	25 May 2020	1 June 2024	4 years, 7 days
32	Michael "Sean" McClanahan	Colonel; Michael "Sean" McClanahan	1 June 2024	Incumbent	2 years, 112 days

== See also ==
- Iowa Air National Guard
- Iowa Army National Guard
- United States Coast Guard Auxiliary
