= Polk City =

Polk City may refer to a place in the United States:

- Polk City, Florida, a city
- Polk City, Iowa, a city
