= Elkhart, Iowa =

- City
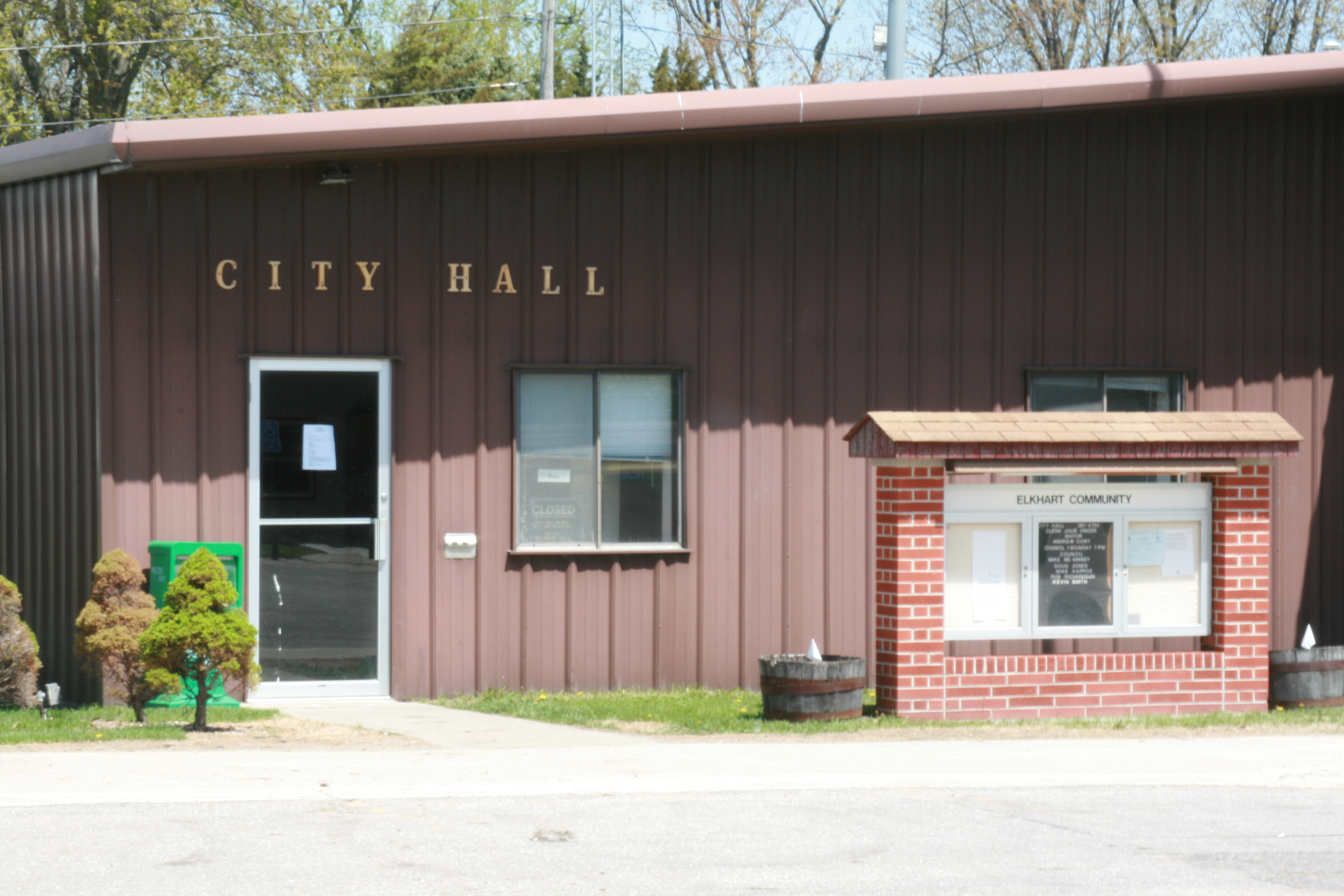
- Elkhart City Hall

- Logo

- Location of Elkhart, Iowa
- Coordinates: 41°47′39″N 93°31′23″W
- Country: United States
- State: Iowa
- County: Polk
- Township: Elkhart
- Established: 1853
- Incorporated: July 27, 1904
- Named for: Elkhart, Indiana

Area
  - Total: 1.78 sq mi (4.62 km^{2})
  - Land: 1.78 sq mi (4.62 km^{2})
  - Water: 0 sq mi (0.00 km^{2})
- Elevation: 974 ft (297 m)

Population (2020)
  - Total: 882
  - Density: 494.7/sq mi (191.01/km^{2})
- Time zone: UTC-6 (Central (CST))
  - Summer (DST): UTC-5 (CDT)
- ZIP code: 50073
- Area code: 515
- FIPS code: 19-24735
- GNIS feature ID: 2394654
- Website: www.elkhartiowa.com

Elkhart is a city in Elkhart Township, Polk County, Iowa, United States. The population was 882 at the time of the 2020 census. It is part of the Des Moines–West Des Moines Metropolitan Statistical Area.

== History ==
Elkhart was founded in 1853 by settlers from Elkhart, Indiana. After a decline in the population of the original town, the Elkhart Post Office was moved to the nearby town of Ottawa. In a few years, the name would be moved once again to its current location. It was incorporated as a city on July 27, 1904.

== Geography ==
According to the United States Census Bureau, the city has a total area of 1.58 square miles (4.09 km^{2}), all land.

== Demographics ==
Historical population
Year	Pop.	±%
1910	132	—
1920	196	+48.5%
1930	218	+11.2%
1940	215	−1.4%
1950	222	+3.3%
1960	260	+17.1%
1970	269	+3.5%
1980	256	−4.8%
1990	388	+51.6%
2000	362	−6.7%
2010	683	+88.7%
2020	882	+29.1%
Source:"U.S. Census website". United States Census Bureau. and Iowa Data Center; Source: U.S. Decennial Census

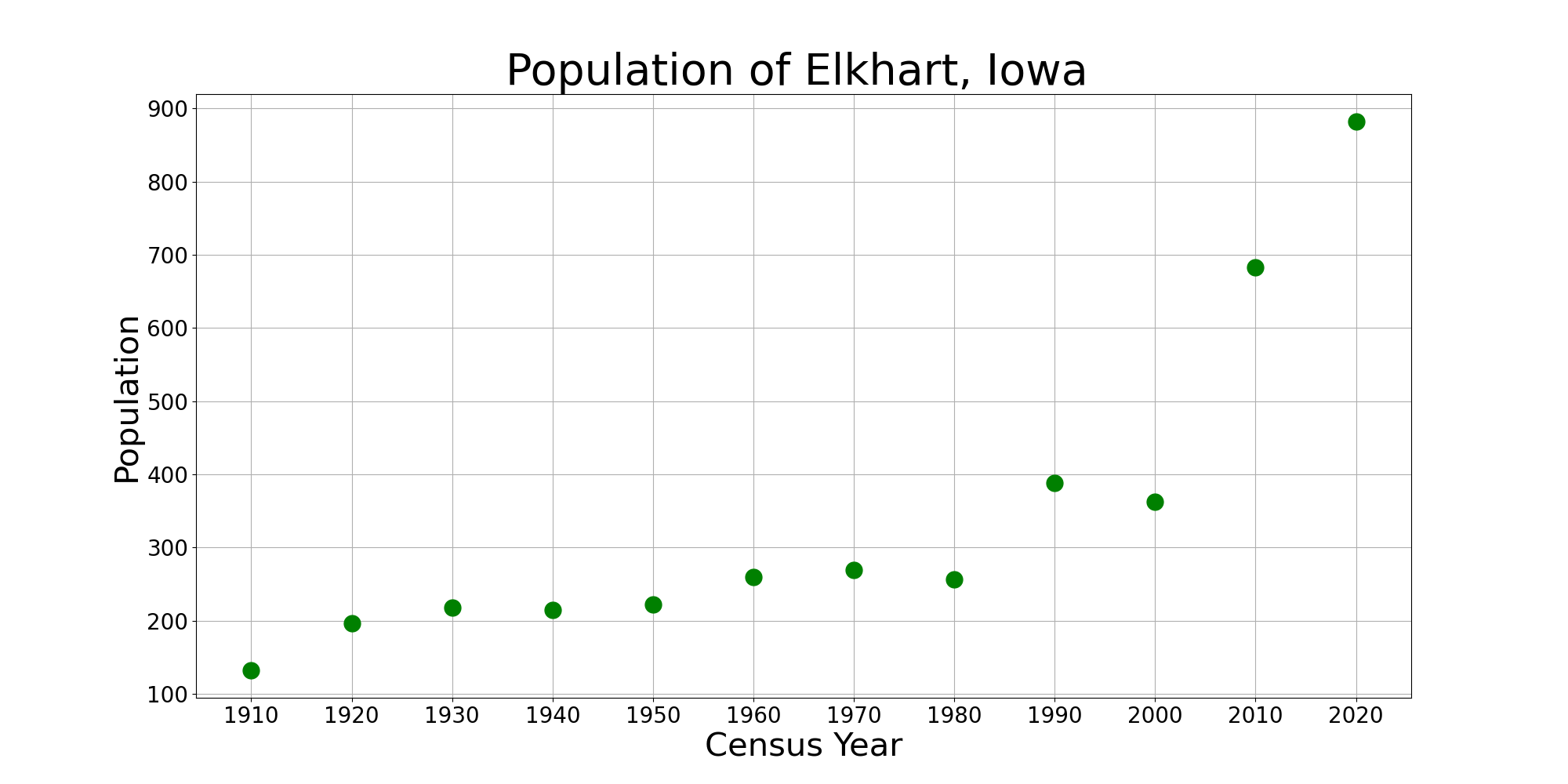
The population of Elkhart, Iowa from US census data

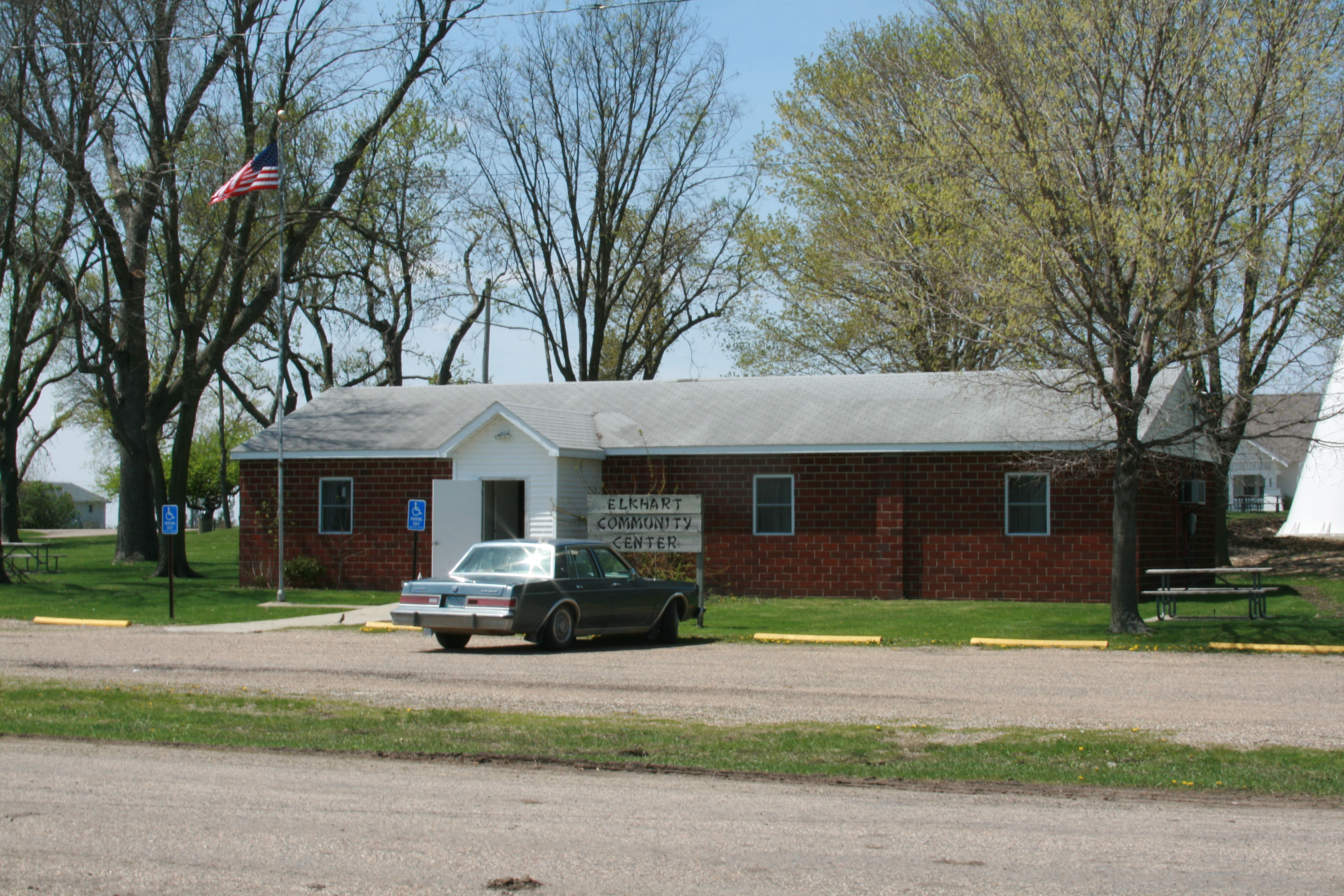
Elkhart Community Center

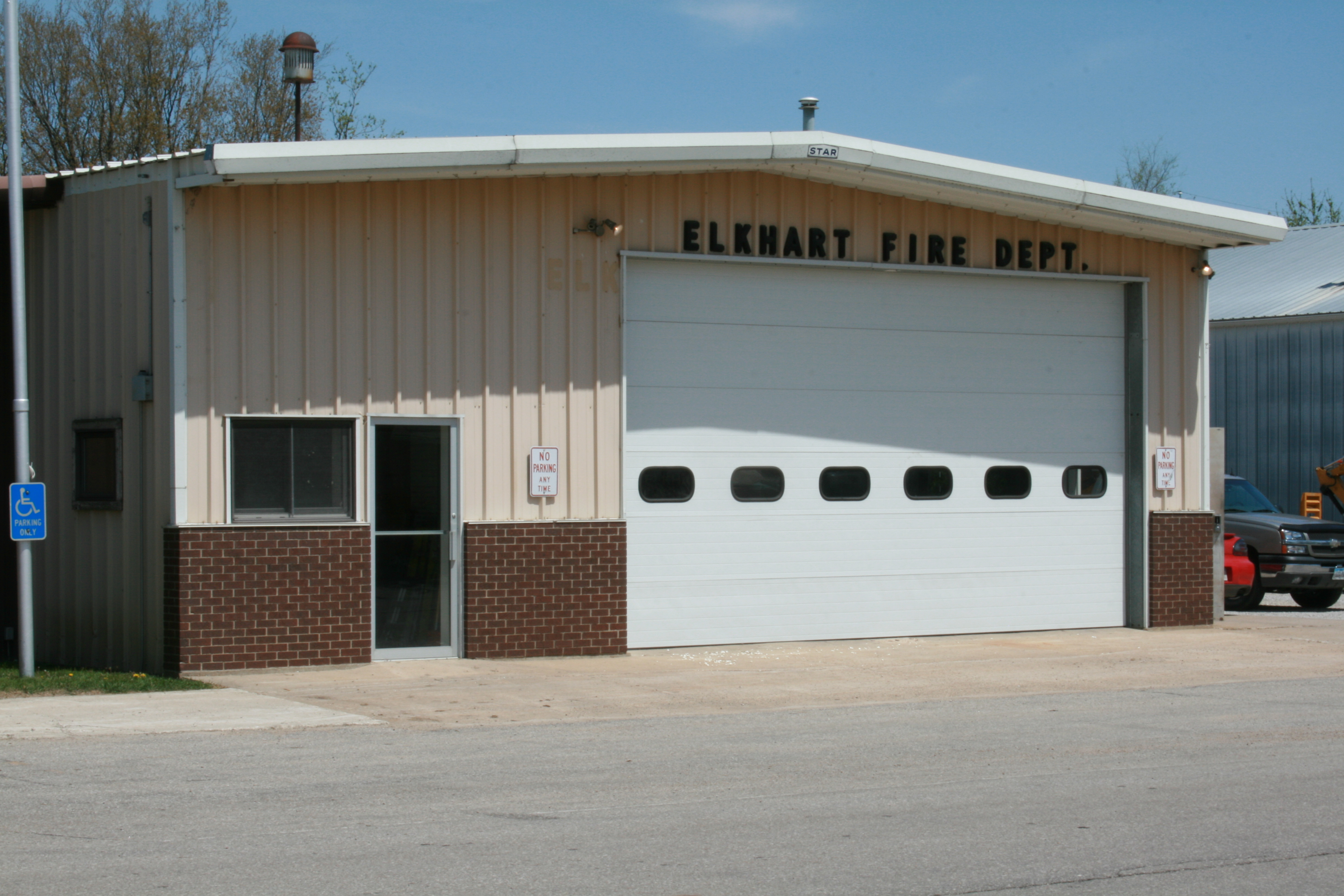
Fire department

=== 2020 census ===
As of the census of 2020, there were 882 people, 335 households, and 233 families residing in the city. The population density was 494.7 inhabitants per square mile (191.0/km^{2}). There were 359 housing units at an average density of 201.4 per square mile (77.7/km^{2}). The racial makeup of the city was 89.0% White, 0.9% Black or African American, 0.0% Native American, 0.5% Asian, 0.0% Pacific Islander, 1.6% from other races and 8.0% from two or more races. Hispanic or Latino persons of any race comprised 7.0% of the population.

Of the 335 households, 46.3% of which had children under the age of 18 living with them, 54.3% were married couples living together, 8.7% were cohabitating couples, 14.0% had a female householder with no spouse or partner present and 23.0% had a male householder with no spouse or partner present. 30.4% of all households were non-families. 23.6% of all households were made up of individuals, 6.6% had someone living alone who was 65 years old or older.

The median age in the city was 30.8 years. 33.3% of the residents were under the age of 20; 4.8% were between the ages of 20 and 24; 35.0% were from 25 and 44; 20.1% were from 45 and 64; and 6.8% were 65 years of age or older. The gender makeup of the city was 53.6% male and 46.4% female.

=== 2010 census ===
As of the census of 2010, there were 683 people, 256 households, and 175 families living in the city. The population density was 432.3 inhabitants per square mile (166.9/km^{2}). There were 269 housing units at an average density of 170.3 per square mile (65.8/km^{2}). The racial makeup of the city was 95.6% White, 1.0% African American, 0.3% Native American, and 3.1% from two or more races. Hispanic or Latino of any race were 3.8% of the population.

There were 256 households, of which 46.1% had children under the age of 18 living with them, 54.3% were married couples living together, 8.2% had a female householder with no husband present, 5.9% had a male householder with no wife present, and 31.6% were non-families. 25.0% of all households were made up of individuals, and 7.5% had someone living alone who was 65 years of age or older. The average household size was 2.67 and the average family size was 3.27.

The median age in the city was 30.6 years. 32.7% of residents were under the age of 18; 7.5% were between the ages of 18 and 24; 32.9% were from 25 to 44; 19.2% were from 45 to 64; and 7.6% were 65 years of age or older. The gender makeup of the city was 51.5% male and 48.5% female.

=== 2000 census ===
As of the census of 2000, there were 362 people, 158 households, and 91 families living in the city. The population density was 306.3 inhabitants per square mile (118.3/km^{2}). There were 163 housing units at an average density of 137.9 per square mile (53.2/km^{2}). The racial makeup of the city was 98.07% White, 1.38% African American, 0.28% Native American, and 0.28% from two or more races. Hispanic or Latino of any race were 0.28% of the population.

There were 158 households, out of which 24.7% had children under the age of 18 living with them, 46.8% were married couples living together, 8.9% had a female householder with no husband present, and 41.8% were non-families. 34.8% of all households were made up of individuals, and 15.8% had someone living alone who was 65 years of age or older. The average household size was 2.29 and the average family size was 2.96.

22.9% are under the age of 18, 11.6% from 18 to 24, 32.3% from 25 to 44, 16.3% from 45 to 64, and 16.9% who were 65 years of age or older. The median age was 34 years. For every 100 females, there were 96.7 males. For every 100 females age 18 and over, there were 96.5 males.

The median income for a household in the city was $33,000, and the median income for a family was $51,042. Males had a median income of $37,500 versus $23,438 for females. The per capita income for the city was $20,397. None of the families and 4.7% of the population were living below the poverty line, including no under eighteens and 8.6% of those over 64.

== Education ==
The community is within the North Polk Community School District.
