= Lincoln Township, Polk County, Iowa =

Township in Polk County, Iowa, U.S.

Lincoln Township is a township in Polk County, Iowa, United States. It contains the town of Alleman, and portions of Sheldahl, Ankeny and Polk City. All but the northeast corner of the township attends the North Polk Community School District, in Alleman. Fourmile creek runs through the township, and is the only continuous waterway through the township.

The Union Pacific railroad ran through the southwest corner and west border from the early 1870s until 2003.

The Fort Dodge, Des Moines and Southern Railroad ran through the center of the township from 1906 to 1968. It was an electrified line

== History ==
Lincoln Township was established in 1870.

The railroad built through here was first the Des Moines and Minneapolis Railroad, surveyed 1866 and built in the early 1870s as a narrow gauge railroad. In 1869, the Chicago and Northwestern Railroad announced they would purchase all bonds for the railroad, but did not do so. For some years, the railroad lay dormant, likely due to the depression after the Civil War. In 1879, the Chicago and Northwestern Railroad took control of the Des Moines and Minneapolis Railroad, due to the Des Moines & Minneapolis Railroad defaulting on loans. In 1880, the C&NW RR converted the railroad to standard gauge, bypassing Polk City and running the railroad through the southwestern portion of the Lincoln Township.

The C&NW RR was bought by the Union Pacific railroad in 1995. In 2003, the railroad was officially abandoned by the UP RR.

In November 2005, the old railbed was sold to the Iowa Natural Heritage Foundation. Two months later the land was transferred to the Polk County Conservation Board. In 2007, the High Trestle trail was built on the abandoned railbed.

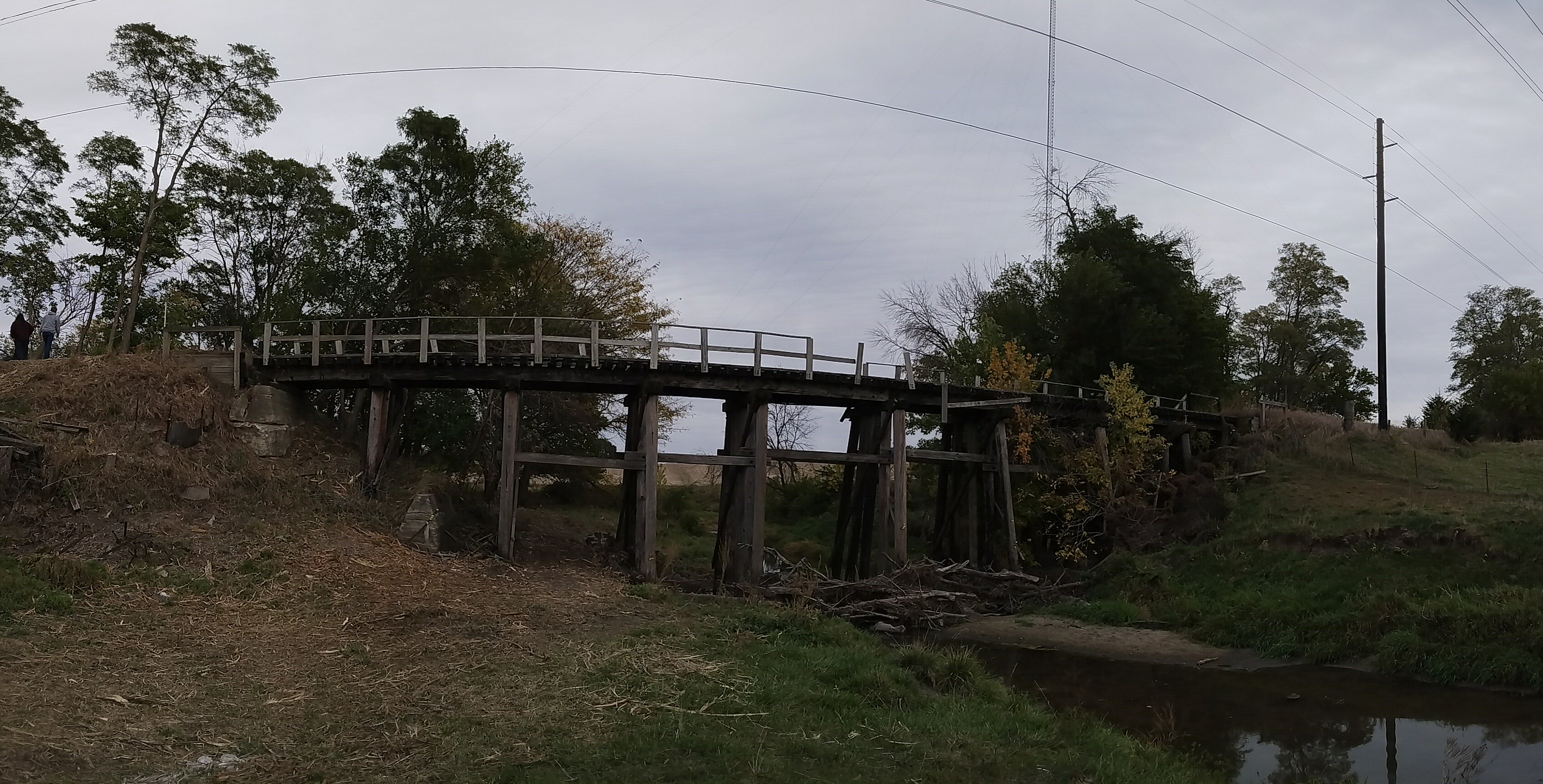
FDDM&S Fourmile Creek bridge

The Fort Dodge, Des Moines, and Southern Railroad ran through the center of the township and where Alleman currently stands. It was built in 1906 as a commuter line between Des Moines and Fort Dodge, including a stop in Alleman. In late 1928, the line stopped running commuter trains. On June 13th, 1966, the railroad trestle over Forumile Creek (41.802650°N 93.610249°W) collapsed as a train ran over it, sending six cars filled with grain into the flooded creek. The trestle was rebuilt and still stands today located in public land and carries an access road for a radio tower. The line was bought by the Chicago and Northwestern Railroad in 1968, and abandoned in the early 1980s, although by that point it was disused. The old rail station still exists today as a private residence, and there are no future plans for a trail connection along the railbed.

The Palmer Post Office existed from 1871 to 1885, located just north of the current corner of 16th Street and 134th Avenue. The Post Office in Alleman has existed since June 3rd of 1908.

Ulm Station existed on the Lincoln Township side of the Des Moines and Minneapolis railroad in the 1870s, between current 134th Avenue and 142nd Avenue beside 58th Street.

In 1956, the North Polk School District was formed from the Alleman, Elkhart, Sheldahl, and White Oak School Districts, with Polk City joining a year later. In 2013, the district built a new high school and football field. The high school was added onto in 2021 as well as in 2024, with extra football seating also being added in 2024.

The town of Alleman was incorporated in 1973 but had existed as an unincorporated town for decades.

A small portion of the Lincoln Township was annexed into Ankeny in 2013. In 2022 and onwards, Ankeny has been rapidly expanding northwards as developments are planned. As of 2023, the entirety of the southeast portion of the township is in Ankeny.

In 2023, the township gained county land when the Polk County Convervation Board bought land along Fourmile Creek. Alleman has slowly been building up infrastructure inside the park.
