= Derald Langham =

American geneticist

Derald George Langham
- Born: May 27, 1913; Polk City, Iowa, U.S.
- Died: May 10, 1991 (aged 77); Wellton, Arizona, U.S.
- Education: Iowa State College, Cornell University (Ph.D. 1939), United States International University (2nd Ph.D. 1969)
- Occupations: plant geneticist, sesame researcher
- Scientific career
- Institutions: Agricultural experiment station, Caracas, Venezuela; Yale University
- Doctoral advisor: Rollins A. Emerson

Derald George Langham (May 27, 1913 – May 10, 1991) was an American agricultural geneticist, sesame researcher, and founder of the Genesa Foundation.

He is known as the "father of sesame" in the Western Hemisphere for his basic research on the genetics of sesame. Most of the sesame lines grown in the Americas came from his breeding work. Sesame plants are a rich source of vitamins and minerals, and Langham focused on cross-breeding the plant into more fruitful versions. He also attempted to look for other uses of sesame beyond a mere food source.

Derald Langham is less known for his genetic work in corn and beans. The Rockefeller Institute in Mexico incorporated his varieties into their materials and his genes are carried on in almost every corn hybrid used in the world.

== Family and education ==
He was born on a 160-acre (65-hectare) farm in Polk City, Iowa, where his interest in plants and animals was piqued at an early age.

Langham attended Iowa State College and studied agronomy, where he met the head of the genetics department, Dr. Ernest W. Lindstrom. Lindstrom encouraged him to pursue his interest in genetics, and he continued his studies under Professor Rollins A. Emerson at Cornell University.

Langham received his first Ph.D. in genetics in from Cornell University in Plant Genetics in 1939, and his second Ph.D. in humanities in 1969 from United States International University in San Diego.

He later taught at Yale University after spending a number of years in Venezuela, and finally settled his family in Fallbrook, California. He had four children with his wife Margery "Maje" Langham - Jeri, Ray, Lisa, and Tina.

== Venezuela plant research ==
While still in his twenties, Langham was hired by the Venezuelan government in 1939 to be the geneticist at the first agricultural experiment station in Venezuela. Much of his funding came from the Rockefeller Foundation National Science Program, one of many programs founded by Nelson Rockefeller to bolster economic programs in Latin American countries. Langham served as a consultant to Rockefeller shortly after his Venezuela government service.

Emerson's successor at Cornell, Herbert Whetzel, had directed a mission for the Venezuela Ministry of Agriculture in 1938. He recommended Langham to the Venezuelan government for a position at the Agricultural Experiment Station in Caracas. Langham also taught genetics at the new College of Agriculture, which was set up the previous year.

He later became the leader of the Venezuela National Plant Genetics Program. His growing techniques helped to feed the population through new strains of crops during World War II, after German U-Boats had disrupted the flow of food supplies to the country by harassing Caribbean shipping lanes.

He soon discovered a variety of cross-breeding techniques to increase the yield and sustainability of corn and sesame. One plant he developed increased the yield of corn in Venezuela by 400 percent, necessitating the building of a corn seedbank to save local strains of the plant in Central and South America.

His crash program in self-sufficiency during World War II led the Venezuelan government to place him in charge of the country's entire agricultural sector. Venezuelan President Rafael Caldera Rodriguez later awarded him the Order of Merit of Performance in 1972, the highest honor ever given to a foreigner at the time. During his award ceremony he was honored as the "father of modern agriculture in Venezuela." He also trained future Ministers of Agriculture and most of the leaders in agriculture from the 1940s to 1960s.

== Post-Venezuela years ==
Langham left Venezuelan government service in December 1949 after being squeezed out by political leaders in the agricultural department. The leaders did not believe a foreigner should serve at such a high post in government.

He stayed in Venezuela for another ten years, continuing his research through private foundations. Eventually, he departed the country so his children could pursue their education in the United States, and moved to Connecticut to take a position at Yale University. He still commuted back to Venezuela occasionally to keep contacts for his company Genetica Venezolana, S.A.

Langham also formed two other companies, including The Sesamum Foundation, which was a non-profit organization with the motto “Serving Sesame”. The organization linked sesame researchers internationally and received/distributed sesame germplasm. He was also one of the founders of Sesaco Corporation, a company still in operation that is based in San Antonio, Texas. Sesaco, an acronym for "sesame coordinators", developed the first totally mechanized sesame varieties.

== Circle Gardening ==
His 1978 book “Circle Gardening” discusses his use of Genesa principles in the shaping and contouring of garden beds to enhance plant growth. While in Venezuela in the mid-1950s, Langham searched for a solution to the problem of keeping his valuable genetic strains of sesame from mixing together during heavy rains. During this search, he discovered that his sesame plants grew much better when planted in a circle, rather than in straight lines in usual growing patterns.

== Genesa ==
In the 1950s Langham founded the Genesa Foundation, which promoted the use of Circle Gardening techniques and the Genesa ideas. Genesa, he later said, came from a combination of the word "gene" with the letters "SA", which stand for South America.

He also promoted the use of his Genesa Crystals, or eight-point patterns that reflect the cells of an embryonic organism. According to Dr. Langham, these crystals, now sold through many new age and holistic jewelers, had "the full potential for infinite love, for infinite wisdom, for infinite form, for infinite energy, for infinite power, for the Soul, for eternal time, for infinite velocity, for infinite faith. It has all your goals, your desires, your motivations – even life itself."

Langham believed that the crystal, known as an Archimedean solid or a cuboctahedron, held infinite potential for people to bond with the energies in their lives. One could meditate in a larger Genesa crystal standing in a garden to help tune into the biofields of the surrounding plants.

The supposed benefits of crystals, however, have not been accepted by the scientific community, and belief in crystal power is widely considered to be pseudoscience.

Langham went on to sponsor conferences throughout the United States, Venezuela, Europe, and Canada that sought to show students how to apply Genesa principles to all facets of their lives. He continued this work until his death in Yuma, Arizona, in 1991.

The Derald G. Langham Memorial Research Grant, established in his honor through the Neotropical Grassland Conservancy, provides a $2000 grant to scientists in the American tropics doing research on grassland or associated ecosystem plants.

== Publications ==
Langham had over 100 publications in various scholarly works, including Science and Journal of Crop Sciences.

- Circle Gardening: Producing Food by Genesa Principles (1978)
- 13-dimensional genetics (Tomorrow's thinking today) (1967)
- Genesa: A Conceptual Model to Synthesize, Synchronize, and Vitalize Man's Interpretation of Universal Phenomena (1969)
- Genesa Dynamics Applied to Color, Number, Alphabet, Geography, and other Basic Systems by Derald G. Langham, Catherine B. Bruch, and James R. Shroads
