= Ankeny, Iowa =

- City
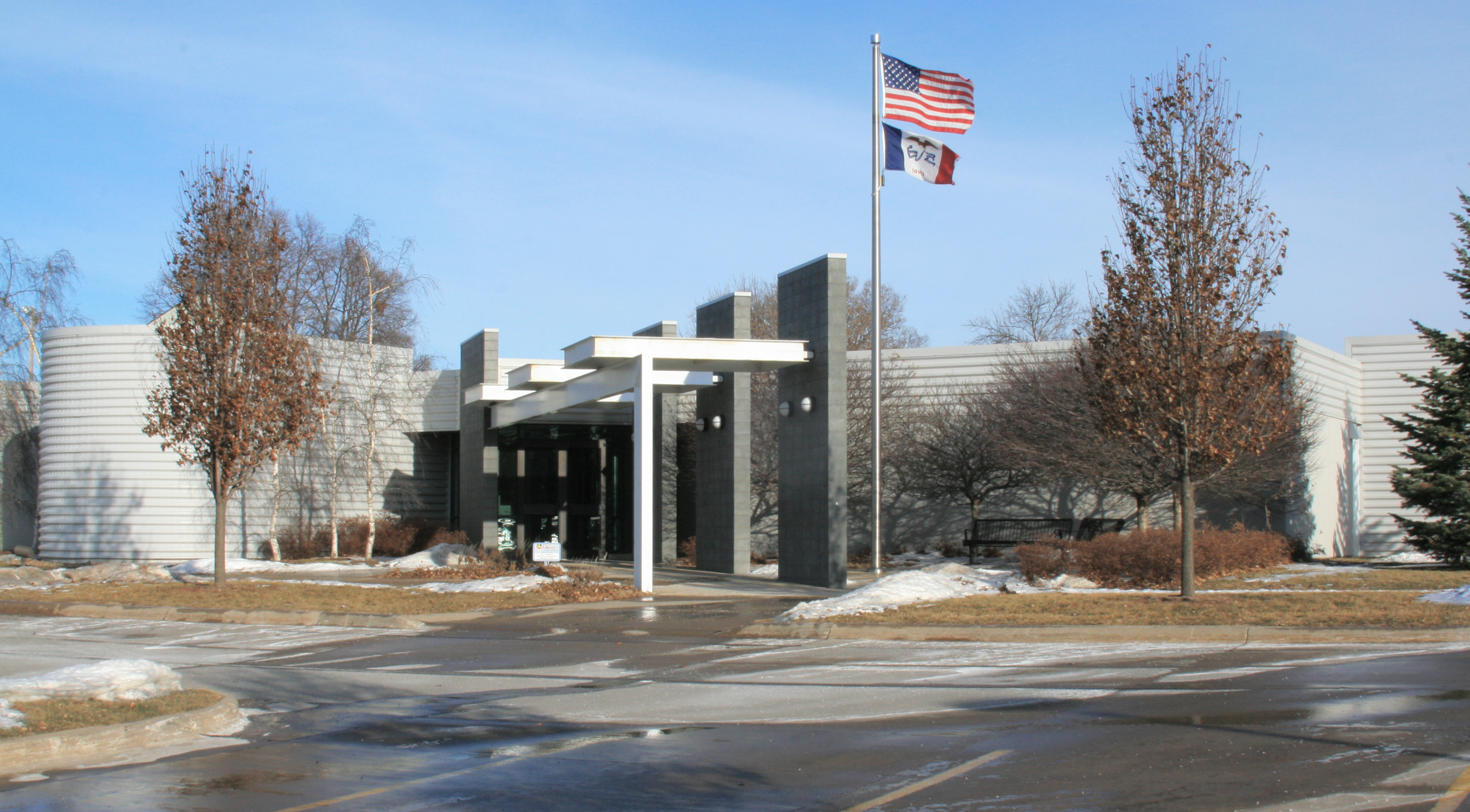
- Ankeny City Hall

- Seal
- Motto: "Bringing it all together"
- Interactive location map of Ankeny
- Coordinates: 41.731281°N 93.601074°W
- Country: United States
- State: Iowa
- County: Polk
- Townships: Crocker, Douglas, Delaware, Lincoln, Elkhart, Saylor
- Founded: April 22, 1875
- Incorporated (town): February 28, 1903
- Incorporated (city): 1961
- Founder: John Fletcher Ankeny

Government
  - Type: Council–Manager
  - Mayor: Bobbi Bentz (acting)
  - Mayor Pro-Tem: Todd Shafer
  - Councilmembers: Matt Davis; Jeff Perry; Joe Ruddy; Kelly Stearns

Area
  - City: 32.835 sq mi (85.042 km^{2})
  - Land: 32.655 sq mi (84.577 km^{2})
  - Water: 0.180 sq mi (0.467 km^{2}) 0.55%
- Elevation: 988 ft (301 m)

Population (2020)
  - City: 67,887
  - Estimate (2025): 77,833
  - Rank: US: 494th IA: 5th
  - Density: 2,078.9/sq mi (802.67/km^{2})
  - Urban: 542,486 (US: 78th)
  - Metro: 753,913 (US: 82nd)
  - Combined: 939,222 (US: 65th)
- Time zone: UTC–6 (Central (CST))
  - Summer (DST): UTC–5 (CDT)
- ZIP Codes: 50021, 50023
- Area code: 515
- FIPS code: 19-02305
- GNIS feature ID: 2393960
- Website: ankenyiowa.gov

Ankeny (/ˈeɪŋkəni/, /ˈæ-/) is a city in Polk County, Iowa, United States and a suburb of the state capital of Des Moines. The population was 67,887 at the 2020 census, and was estimated at 77,833 in 2025, making it Iowa's fifth-most populous city. It is part of the Des Moines–West Des Moines Metropolitan Statistical Area. It is one of Iowa's fastest-growing cities.

== History ==
Ankeny was founded as an agrarian community on April 22, 1875, by John Fletcher Ankeny and Sarah "Sally" Ankeny (née Wolgamot) on 80 acres purchased on July 11, 1874, for $1,600. The town, a single square mile, was formally incorporated on February 28, 1903.

In 1881, the town of Ankeny consisted of seven houses, a Methodist Church, a depot, a combination store/post office, livery stable, a blacksmith shop, rooming house, machine shop, and a school. There was no delivery of mail in the area at this time, and newspapers arrived in town on the train every Friday.

— Ankeny Historical Society

The railroad was eventually laid from Des Moines to Ames via Ankeny. It was completed in 1874 and passenger service was established on July 11, 1880. In the 19th century, the city's industry was primarily agriculture—specifically sorghum and swine production. Sorghum was processed at a nearby mill, while swine were driven to the market in Keokuk.

=== 20th century ===
A local newspaper, the Ankeny Times, began publication on May 17, 1902. Utilities continued to develop with telephone service in 1903 and sparse electricity in 1907. Standard residential electricity became widespread in 1919 after the Central Light and Power Company was authorized to construct a power plant and operate in the city.

Ankeny's first fire department, a volunteer department, was established in 1907 and sparsely outfitted. Four significant fires ravaged the business district (locally known as uptown) between 1932 and 1940, but businesses rebuilt.

In the early 20th century, coal mining became significant as many companies opened shafts and mines near the city. The Enterprise Coal Company used Ankeny as a company town and produced over 100,000 tons of coal in 1914, ranking among Iowa's top 24 coal producers. In 1912, United Mine Workers Local 2476 in Ankeny had 246 members, over half of the total population at the time, and Local 2511 in Enterprise had 395 members.

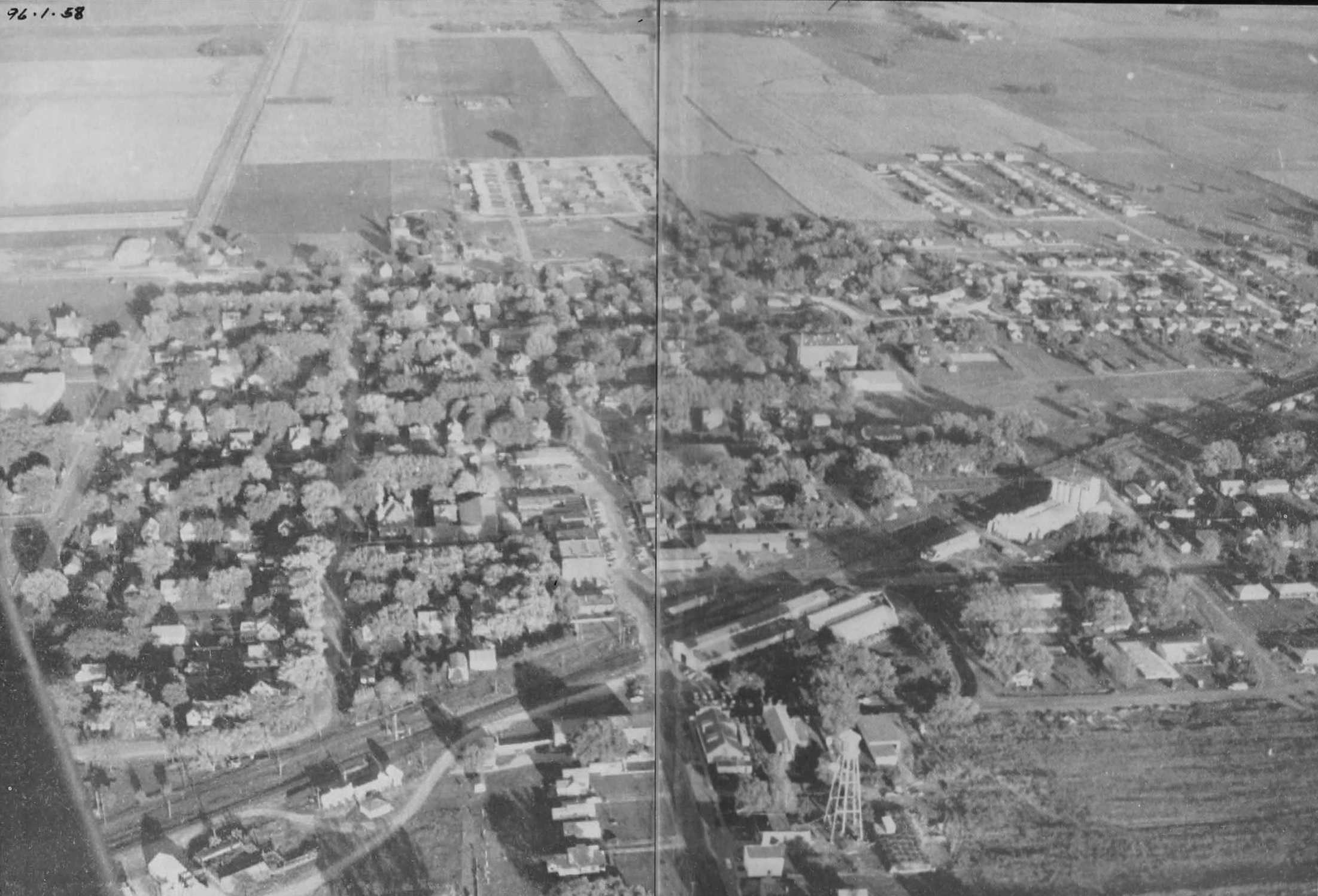
Aerial photo of Ankeny circa 1958 (published in 1959 Ankeny High School yearbook)

==== World War II and postwar ====
Before the 1930s, most of Ankeny's land was used for agriculture. Then manufacturing became increasingly significant. In 1941, amid World War II, the federal government vacated and seized farms via eminent domain for the construction of a military ordnance plant. The plant was fully operational from 1942 until V-E Day, 1945, and officially closed just before V-J day.

In 1947, Deere & Company purchased the factory, which began to manufacture agricultural equipment under the name John Deere Des Moines Works. Iowa State University bought the rest of the land surrounding the plant for agricultural research.

In 1958, mail delivery to residences began, and a second local newspaper, the Ankeny Press-Citizen, began publication on October 1. The city's status was upgraded in 1961 from town to city by the state and federal government. In 1966, the Ankeny Times stopped publication.

==== Later 20th century ====
In 1967, Des Moines Area Community College purchased 240 acres on the southeast of the Iowa State University plot. Construction began in 1968 on a new main campus, Ankeny Campus. Construction on main facilities continued through the 1970s. Also in 1967, Faith Baptist Bible College and Theological Seminary was established in Ankeny. The college was formerly based in Omaha, Nebraska, and known as Omaha Bible Institute (OBI) and Omaha Baptist Bible College (OBBC).

An F4 tornado struck Ankeny in June 1974, along with Des Moines, Pleasant Hill, Runnells, Boundurant, and Carlisle. It killed two people and injured 50.

In 1989, public and private interests began planning for a local airport in northeast Polk County. Ankeny Regional Airport, the result of the project, opened in 1994. The first flight was a Cessna 182 Skylane.

=== 21st century ===
In 2003, changes in Iowa state law allowed Iowa State University to sell off its research plot near Ankeny, which it did to the city in June 2005 for $23.6 million. In 2004, the city government had requested proposals for a new district called Prairie Trail to be created on the plot. In September 2005, the city sold the land to Dennis Albaugh, whose company submitted the chosen proposal for the same price. The city agreed to invest up to $20 million in basic infrastructure for the district, which Albaugh's company agreed to match and enter into a Civic Trust Fund to be used for public facilities.

In 2008, Ankeny was recognized as one of the top ten towns for families by Family Circle. In 2009, it ranked 62nd on Money magazine's list of the top 100 places to live.

In 2017, an $8.5 million bond referendum to create a new, modern library passed. The project, with a budget of $25 million, broke ground in 2018. The old Kirkendall Public Library had been used since 1996 and had 26,000 square feet (2,400 m^{2}). The new Kirkendall Public Library, with 55,000 square feet (5,100 m^{2}) of space, opened in 2020.

== Geography ==
Ankeny is in north-central Polk County. It is bordered on the east by Interstate 35, with U.S. Route 69 running through the center of the town. Most of Ankeny's area is dry land; there are a few park ponds and streams. According to the United States Census Bureau, the city has an area of 32.835 square miles (85.04 km^{2}), of which 32.655 square miles (84.58 km^{2}) is land and 0.180 square miles (0.47 km^{2}) (0.55%) is water.

Like most of Polk County, Ankeny is at the bottom area of the Des Moines Lobe, a topographical landscape area, in an area known as the Bemis Advance. The Lobe formed during the Wisconsin glaciation, leaving significant deposits and an area of low relief.

The upper sediments Ankeny sits upon are primarily a mixture of silt, sand, gravel, and loam types less than eight meters deep. The water table is seasonally elevated. The bedrock the city sits on is part of the Cherokee Group and composed of primarily grey shale and sandstone, with secondary black shale, coal, and mudstone.

=== Climate ===
According to the Köppen Climate Classification system, Ankeny has a hot-summer humid continental climate, abbreviated "Dfa" on climate maps.

Climate data for Ankeny, Iowa, 1991–2020 normals, extremes 1950–present
Month	Jan	Feb	Mar	Apr	May	Jun	Jul	Aug	Sep	Oct	Nov	Dec	Year
Record high °F (°C)	67 (19)	74 (23)	90 (32)	93 (34)	99 (37)	102 (39)	105 (41)	106 (41)	100 (38)	94 (34)	83 (28)	70 (21)	106 (41)
Mean maximum °F (°C)	52.7 (11.5)	58.3 (14.6)	73.1 (22.8)	83.0 (28.3)	88.8 (31.6)	93.5 (34.2)	96.1 (35.6)	94.8 (34.9)	91.2 (32.9)	84.6 (29.2)	70.3 (21.3)	57.0 (13.9)	97.1 (36.2)
Mean daily maximum °F (°C)	29.5 (−1.4)	34.2 (1.2)	47.4 (8.6)	61.0 (16.1)	71.9 (22.2)	81.8 (27.7)	85.7 (29.8)	83.7 (28.7)	77.1 (25.1)	63.6 (17.6)	47.8 (8.8)	34.7 (1.5)	59.9 (15.5)
Daily mean °F (°C)	20.6 (−6.3)	25.1 (−3.8)	37.4 (3.0)	49.5 (9.7)	61.1 (16.2)	71.3 (21.8)	75.2 (24.0)	72.7 (22.6)	65.0 (18.3)	52.0 (11.1)	38.4 (3.6)	26.3 (−3.2)	49.5 (9.7)
Mean daily minimum °F (°C)	11.7 (−11.3)	16.0 (−8.9)	27.4 (−2.6)	38.1 (3.4)	50.3 (10.2)	60.8 (16.0)	64.7 (18.2)	61.7 (16.5)	52.9 (11.6)	40.5 (4.7)	28.9 (−1.7)	18.0 (−7.8)	39.2 (4.0)
Mean minimum °F (°C)	−9.6 (−23.1)	−6.3 (−21.3)	7.0 (−13.9)	22.0 (−5.6)	35.1 (1.7)	46.9 (8.3)	52.2 (11.2)	50.6 (10.3)	36.7 (2.6)	22.9 (−5.1)	10.4 (−12.0)	−3.0 (−19.4)	−13.1 (−25.1)
Record low °F (°C)	−28 (−33)	−34 (−37)	−23 (−31)	8 (−13)	26 (−3)	40 (4)	42 (6)	39 (4)	22 (−6)	5 (−15)	−7 (−22)	−25 (−32)	−34 (−37)
Average precipitation inches (mm)	0.97 (25)	0.99 (25)	2.01 (51)	4.00 (102)	5.26 (134)	5.37 (136)	4.19 (106)	4.72 (120)	3.62 (92)	2.67 (68)	1.86 (47)	1.39 (35)	37.05 (941)
Average snowfall inches (cm)	6.2 (16)	8.0 (20)	3.7 (9.4)	0.7 (1.8)	0.0 (0.0)	0.0 (0.0)	0.0 (0.0)	0.0 (0.0)	0.0 (0.0)	0.6 (1.5)	1.0 (2.5)	4.5 (11)	24.7 (62.2)
Average precipitation days (≥ 0.01 in)	6.1	5.9	7.5	10.6	12.2	10.9	9.1	9.9	8.3	8.0	6.7	7.0	102.2
Average snowy days (≥ 0.1 in)	4.1	4.2	1.7	0.6	0.0	0.0	0.0	0.0	0.0	0.3	0.7	3.6	15.2
Source 1: NOAA
Source 2: NWS

== Demographics ==
Historical population
Census	Pop.	Note	%±
1910	445		—
1920	648		45.6%
1930	632		−2.5%
1940	779		23.3%
1950	1,229		57.8%
1960	2,964		141.2%
1970	9,151		208.7%
1980	15,429		68.6%
1990	18,482		19.8%
2000	27,117		46.7%
2010	45,582		68.1%
2020	67,887		48.9%
2025 (est.)	77,833	▲	14.7%
U.S. Decennial Census; 2020 Census

According to Zillow, the average price of a home in Ankeny as of November 30, 2025, was $334,054.

As of the 2024 American Community Survey, Ankeny had an estimated 28,926 households with an average of 2.62 persons per household and a median household income of $102,518. About 3.4% of the city's population lives at or below the poverty line. Ankeny has an estimated 73.8% employment rate, with 50.7% of the population holding a bachelor's degree or higher and 96.1% holding a high school diploma. There were 31,328 housing units at an average density of 959.36 per square mile (370.4/km^{2}).

=== Racial and ethnic composition ===
Ankeny, Iowa – racial and ethnic composition Note: the US Census treats Hispanic/Latino as an ethnic category. This table excludes Latinos from the racial categories and assigns them to a separate category. Hispanics/Latinos may be of any race.
Race / ethnicity (NH = non-Hispanic)	Pop. 1990	Pop. 2000	Pop. 2010	Pop. 2020	% 1990	% 2000	% 2010	% 2020
White alone (NH)	18,182	26,137	42,497	58,814	98.38%	96.39%	93.23%	86.64%
Black or African American alone (NH)	72	199	540	1,672	0.39%	0.73%	1.18%	2.46%
Native American or Alaska Native alone (NH)	22	32	56	114	0.12%	0.12%	0.12%	0.17%
Asian alone (NH)	93	254	908	1,630	0.50%	0.94%	1.99%	2.40%
Pacific Islander alone (NH)	—	7	22	35	—	0.03%	0.05%	0.05%
Other race alone (NH)	4	13	20	283	0.02%	0.05%	0.04%	0.42%
Mixed race or multiracial (NH)	—	182	506	2,508	—	0.67%	1.11%	3.69%
Hispanic or Latino (any race)	109	293	1,033	2,831	0.59%	1.08%	2.27%	4.17%
Total	18,482	27,117	45,582	67,887	100.00%	100.00%	100.00%	100.00%

=== 2024 estimate ===
As of the 2024 estimate, there were 76,727 people, 28,926 households, and _ families residing in the city. The population density was 2,349.62 inhabitants per square mile (907.2/km^{2}). There were 31,328 housing units at an average density of 959.36 per square mile (370.4/km^{2}). The racial makeup of the city was 89.8% White (88.0% NH White), 2.0% African American, 0.0% Native American, 3.1% Asian, 0.0% Pacific Islander, _% from some other races and 3.8% from two or more races. Hispanic or Latino people of any race were 4.0% of the population.

==== Special census ====
Since the city's first census results in 1910 of 445 inhabitants, Ankeny's population has grown continually to an estimated 76,727 in 2024, an increase from 67,887 people in 2020, 45,562 in 2010, and 27,117 in 2000

Ankeny has been noted multiple times in recent years by the Census Bureau for rapid population growth, being listed as the fourth fastest growing city July 2016 – 2017 with a growth rate of 6.4% and the tenth fastest growing July 2017 – 2018 with a growth rate of 4.6%. To keep pace with growing population numbers, the city has requested a special census every decade since the 1970s in 1975, 1985, 1994, 2005, 2014, and 2024.

High growth rates have led to nearly 80% of Ankeny residents surveyed in 2018 to agree the city's population growth was "somewhat too fast" or "much too fast". The growth has also led to infrastructure strain and challenges.

=== 2020 census ===
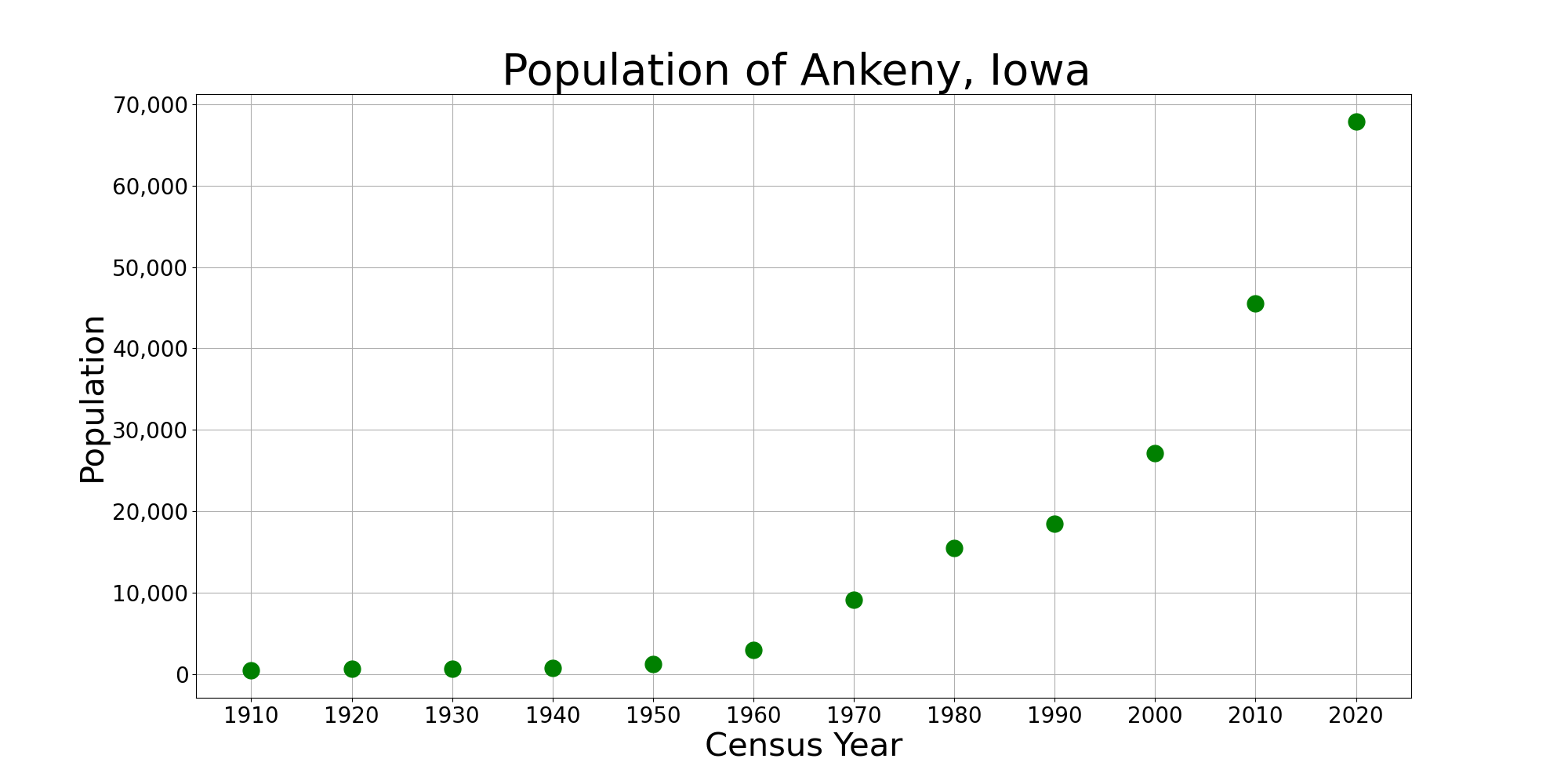
The population of Ankeny, Iowa from the U.S. census data

As of the 2020 census, there were 67,887 people, 26,375 households, and 17,475 families residing in the city. The population density was 2,243.68 inhabitants per square mile (866.3/km^{2}). There were 27,971 housing units at an average density of 924.45 per square mile (356.9/km^{2}).

The median age was 34.0 years. 26.6% of residents were under the age of 18 and 12.2% of residents were 65 years of age or older. For every 100 females there were 95.4 males, and for every 100 females age 18 and over there were 93.3 males age 18 and over.

99.1% of residents lived in urban areas, while 0.9% lived in rural areas.

There were 26,375 households in Ankeny, of which 35.1% had children under the age of 18 living in them. Of all households, 54.4% were married-couple households, 16.1% were households with a male householder and no spouse or partner present, and 22.2% were households with a female householder and no spouse or partner present. About 25.1% of all households were made up of individuals and 7.9% had someone living alone who was 65 years of age or older.

There were 27,971 housing units, of which 5.7% were vacant. The homeowner vacancy rate was 1.4% and the rental vacancy rate was 11.2%.

Racial composition as of the 2020 census
Race	Number	Percent
White	59,648	87.9%
Black or African American	1,706	2.5%
American Indian and Alaska Native	152	0.2%
Asian	1,637	2.4%
Native Hawaiian and Other Pacific Islander	35	0.1%
Some other race	1,003	1.5%
Two or more races	3,706	5.5%
Hispanic or Latino (of any race)	2,831	4.2%

==== 2014 special census ====
In 2014, a special census was performed by decision of the city, on which it spent $825,000. This census was completed on December 12, 2014, and listed a new official population count of 54,598 inhabitants and 21,918 households, an increase of 19.7% and 25.7%, respectively, to the 2010 decennial census. Documenting the increased population numbers allowed the city to accrue an estimated $4.5 million more in allocated state funding for road construction and repairs.

=== 2010 census ===
As of the 2010 census, there were 45,582 people, 17,433 households, and 12,087 families residing in the city. The population density was 1,554.11 inhabitants per square mile (600.0/km^{2}). There were 18,339 housing units at an average density of 625.26 per square mile (241.4/km^{2}). The racial makeup of the city was 94.75% White, 1.20% African American, 0.14% Native American, 2.01% Asian, 0.05% Pacific Islander, 0.56% from some other races and 1.29% from two or more races. Hispanic or Latino people of any race were 2.27% of the population.

There were 17,433 households, of which 38.4% had children under the age of 18 living with them, 58.9% were married couples living together, 7.2% had a female householder with no husband present, 3.2% had a male householder with no wife present, and 30.7% were non-families. 22.6% of all households were made up of individuals, and 6.2% had someone living alone who was 65 years of age or older. The average household size was 2.58 and the average family size was 3.08.

The median age in the city was 31.9 years. 27.7% of residents were under the age of 18; 9.1% were between the ages of 18 and 24; 33.7% were from 25 to 44; 21.1% were from 45 to 64; and 8.3% were 65 years of age or older. The gender makeup of the city was 49.0% male and 51.0% female.

Regarding household income, the median income was $51,914 while average income was $70,883. Family income had a median of $62,982 and average of $82,446. Among full-time, year-round workers, the median earnings were $46,478 for men and $36,040 for women. Poverty affecting families was present at a 10.1% general rate with a 28.9% rate of families run by single mothers. Poverty affected 13.8% of inhabitants, 19.2% of minor inhabitants, and 12.1% of those 18 years old and older.

=== 2000 census ===
As of the 2000 census, there were 27,117 people, 10,339 households, and 7,278 families residing in the city. The population density was 1,616.55 inhabitants per square mile (624.2/km^{2}). There were 10,882 housing units at an average density of 648.72 per square mile (250.5/km^{2}). The racial makeup of the city was 96.94% White, 0.76% African American, 0.15% Native American, 0.94% Asian, 0.03% Pacific Islander, 0.38% from some other races and 0.81% from two or more races. Hispanic or Latino people of any race were 1.08% of the population.

There are 10,339 households out of which 38.1% have children under the age of 18 living with them, 60.7% are married couples living together, 7.3% have a female householder with no husband present, and 29.6% are non-families. 21.8% of all households are made up of individuals and 5.8% have someone living alone who is 65 years of age or older. The average household size is 2.57 and the average family size is 3.05.

In the city the population is spread out with 27.1% under the age of 18, 11.4% from 18 to 24, 33.4% from 25 to 44, 20.1% from 45 to 64, and 8.0% who are 65 years of age or older. The median age is 32 years. For every 100 females there are 94.0 males. For every 100 females age 18 and over, there are 91.4 males.

The median income for a household in the city is $55,162, and the median income for a family is $66,433. Males have a median income of $42,220 versus $29,083 for females. The per capita income for the city is $25,143. 4.0% of the population and 2.5% of families are below the poverty line. Out of the total people living in poverty, 4.1% are under the age of 18 and 2.5% are 65 or older.

== Economy ==
Ankeny's economic industry breakdown (2019)
1. Education and Healthcare Services (23.3%)
2. Finance, Insurance, and Real Estate (14.1%)
3. Retail (12.0%)
4. Professional Services (9.03%)
5. Entertainment and Recreation (7.81%)
6. Manufacturing (7.77%)
7. Construction (5.59%)
8. Other Services (5.13%)
9. Public Administration (4.81%)
10. Transportation, Warehousing, and Utilities (3.71%)
11. Wholesale (3.68%)
12. Agriculture (1.78%)
13. Information and Data (1.29%)

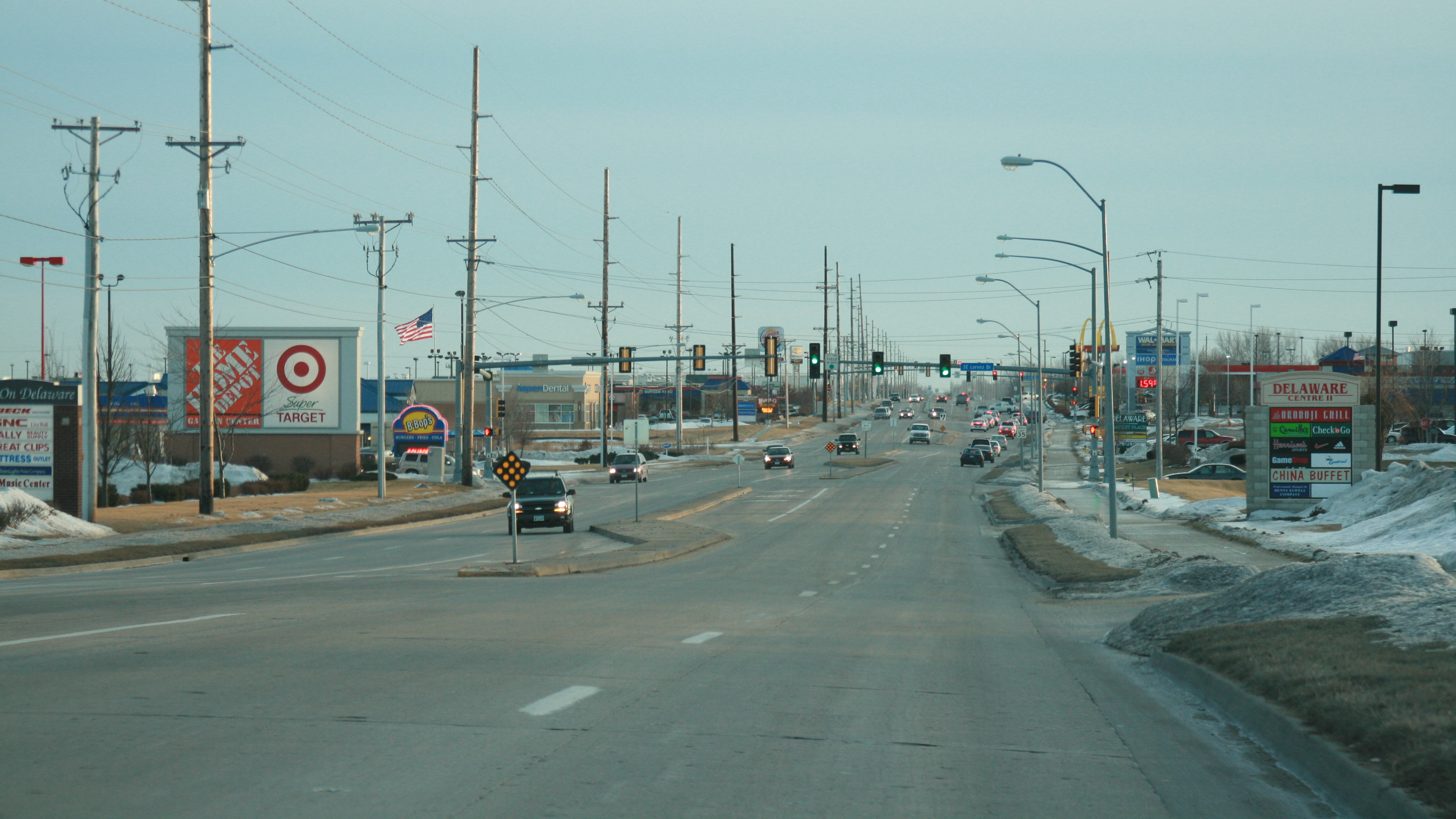
Delaware Avenue, a business-heavy thoroughfare

The Ankeny city government's fiscal year 2020 budget listed total property values of $779 million in commercial, $177 million in industrial, $56 million in utilities, $113 million in multi-residential, and $4.64 billion in residential property. The median home value was $197,500. According to the budget, Ankeny "saw one of its best years for construction activity" in 2018 with commercial construction valued at $71 million and residential construction at $173 million. There were 5,089 businesses in Ankeny with $972 million in taxable retail sales.

The largest businesses by highest taxable valuation were Deere & Company ($42.6 million), DRA Properties, LC ($36 million), Mid-American Energy ($27.4 million), DLE Seven, LLC ($24 million), Casey's General Stores ($23.3 million), Hurd Fleet, LLC ($21.7 million), Denny Elwell Family, LC ($20.8 million), B&G Foods North America ($19.9 million), Woodland Reserve Apartments, LC ($19.9 million), and Perishable Distributors of Iowa, Ltd. (a Hy-Vee subsidiary) ($17.3 million).

The largest employers by number of employees were Ankeny Community Schools (1,965), Deere & Company (1,900), Casey's General Stores (1,260), the City of Ankeny (786), Perishable Distributors of Iowa, Ltd. (687), Des Moines Area Community College (611), Baker Group (560), Purfoods (517), B&G Foods North America (400), and Accumold (350).

The largest industrial occupations were education and health care services (23.34%), finance, insurance, and real estate (14.07%), retail (11.99%), professional services (9.03%), entertainment and recreation (7.81%), manufacturing (7.77%), construction (5.59%), other services (5.13%), public administration (4.81%), transportation, warehousing, and utilities (3.71%), wholesale (3.68%), agriculture (1.78%), and information and data (1.29%).

The United States Census Bureau estimates that between 2013 and 2017, 78.7% of the population 16 and older were part of the civilian labor force, with 73.4% specifically for women.

In 2012, the Census Bureau's Survey of Business Owners (SBO) reported that Ankeny had 4,388 businesses with $8.081 billion in business and $748 million in annual payroll. Of those businesses, 619 were in construction, 143 wholesale, 547 retail, 198 transportation and warehousing, 93 data and information technology, 279 finance and insurance, 491 real estate and rental, 478 professional, scientific, and technical services, and 248 administrative, supportive, waste management, and remediation.

== Parks and recreation ==
There used to be a YMCA in Ankeny, of the YMCA of Greater Des Moines. It closed on March 1, 2019, due to problems with funding and a decline in membership.

=== Public and private parks ===
Ankeny has "60 parks covering over 800 acres with a mixture of recreational facilities", including athletic facilities, playgrounds, green spaces, picnic shelters, two aquatic centers, two community centers, a dog park, bandshell, skate park, and a disc golf course. Ankeny has many trail areas in the city totaling over 100 miles. It has two sports complexes. The larger Prairie Ridge Sports Complex comprises 124 acres and provides well-maintained fields for a variety of ball sports. Many public and private sports organizations and teams are based at the complex, which serves over 6,500 youth athletes. The smaller Hawkeye Park Sports Complex has a handful of fields typically used for adult leagues and individual recreational use. The city operates Otter Creek Golf Course, a 200.6-acre facility, as a public golf venue.

The city puts on a variety of recreational programs, sometimes involving school district facilities, including all-ages athletic teams and training, senior citizen activities, seasonal/holiday events, dances, first aid and CPR training, arts and crafts, public yoga, charter bus expeditions, and basic skills. There are also artistic and cultural organizations, such as the Ankeny Area Historical Society, Ankeny Art Center, Ankeny Community Band, Ankeny Community Chorus, Ankeny Community Theatre, and Art for Ankeny.

Miracle Park, a 14,000 square feet (1,300 m^{2}) playground, is an "all-inclusive" facility specifically designed to accommodate special needs youth. Designed in 2015, the Park adjoins the nearby Ankeny Miracle League baseball field, which provides a location for a local special needs baseball league.

In 2019, the city estimates 160,000 attendees to the two aquatic centers during the summer season, over 14,000 sports events held at the two complexes, over 36,000 participants in public programming (with about 7,600 of those in senior citizen programs), and 29,300 rounds of golf played at Otter Creek.

== Government ==
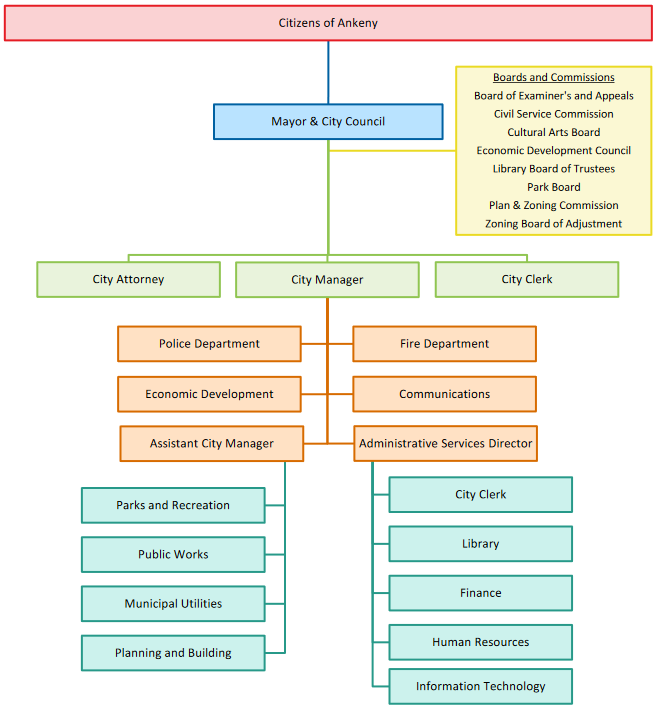
Structure of Ankeny's local/city government

Ankeny's city code specifies municipal governance in the form of a mayor–council government, while city documents describes the city as "Mayor/Council/Manager". The mayor and city council officers are elected to four-year terms, with council terms overlapping. Elected positions in the city fall under Chapter 376 of the Code of Iowa.

=== Mayor ===
The acting mayor of Ankeny is Bobbi Bentz. The original elected mayor for the current term, Mark Holm, was elected to the Polk County Board of Supervisors in 2024. Bentz, who was a city councilor and the mayor pro tem, was appointed acting mayor by her fellow council members through the rest of Holm's term, which ends in 2025. She is running unopposed for mayor in the next election.

According to the city code, the mayor acts as the city CEO and supervises the whole of city governance, representing the city, serving as president of the city council, and appointing officers and officials. The baseline mayoral salary is $10,000 plus expense reimbursement. The mayor has no vote on council legislation, but may approve, veto, or disregard it. The mayor also appoints one council member as mayor pro tem.

=== City council ===
The city council has five members. The current members are Bentz, Kelly Whiting, Jeff Perry, Todd Shafer, and Joe Ruddy.

The council maintains local legal, economic, civic, and public authority over the city, as well as appointing city officers. The mayor pro tem serves as vice-president of the council and discharges the mayor's duties when the mayor is absent or unable. Mayoral vetoes of council decisions can be overridden by supermajority. Council members' salaries are $7,000.

== Education ==
=== Primary and secondary ===
Ankeny has both public and private institutions for primary and secondary education.

==== Ankeny Community School District ====
Ankeny's public school district is the sixth-largest district of its kind in Iowa, with a yearly budget of about $190 million. It educates nearly 12,000 students and employs over 1,500 people. It serves most of the city. The district has 16 buildings and two feeder systems with corresponding institutions. In 2013, the district added a second high school. The district slowly split incoming students into separate systems until the full split was made. Before the split, Ankeny's universal mascot was the Hawk; the Jaguar was introduced with the new secondary system based at Ankeny Centennial High School.

==== Other public schools ====
Part of southern Ankeny on the edge of the city limits is in the Saydel Community School District.

An expanding portion of northern Ankeny (Northgate, Northgate East, Harvest Ridge) is in the North Polk Community School District, in Alleman.

==== Private ====
Ankeny Christian Academy (ACA) is a private, accredited, non-denominational Christian school that offers primary and secondary schooling and preschool. The school was established in 1992 and opened in 1993, moving to its current 1604 West 1st Street location in 2000.

The Diocese of Des Moines opened St. Luke the Evangelist Catholic School in 2015 on the western side of the city at 1102 NW Weigel. The initial school and church building cost of $8.2 million. The school initially housed kindergartners through third-graders. Each year, a new grade was added until it served 8th-graders in 2020. In 2021, a groundbreaking was held for a $3.5 million expansion, with $3.2 million paid through cash and gifts. The nearest Catholic high school is Dowling Catholic High School in West Des Moines.

=== Post-secondary ===
Ankeny hosts a variety of public and private post-secondary education institutions.

Public

Des Moines Area Community College (a.k.a. DMACC) has been based in the city since creation of the Ankeny Campus in the summer of 1967. The Campus currently educates over 15,000 students on their 304-acre plot and offers a large variety of degree, diploma, and certificate programs. Since its inception, the college has been undergoing near-constant additions and renovations. Many other campuses exist across the state under the direction of the Ankeny Campus.

Iowa State University formerly operated a research farm in south Ankeny. However, that land was sold off in 2005 and is now being developed as the Prairie Trail district.

Private

Faith Baptist Bible College and Theological Seminary, the oldest private college in Ankeny, has been an institution in the city since 1967. Originally founded as the Omaha Bible Institute in 1921, the college changed names to the Omaha Baptist Bible College in 1960, before moving from Omaha, Nebraska to Ankeny in the summer of 1967. The graduate-level seminary was added in January 1986.

Upper Iowa University, based in Fayette, Iowa, operates an extension facility in the city at 1535 SE Delaware Ave.

== Infrastructure ==
=== Transportation ===
As of 2018, Ankeny lists 543 miles of road, 369 cul-de-sacs, 6,238 street lights, and 72 traffic signals on city roadways.

Ankeny Regional Airport, a public, non-commercial airport, has provided air access to Ankeny since 1994. It claims to be Iowa's third-busiest airport and allows corporate, individual, and freight use. It is a relief airport for Des Moines International Airport.

Des Moines Area Regional Transit (DART), a public transit agency, operates an express bus route between Ankeny and Des Moines. The route includes stops at DMACC's Ankeny Campus and the High Trestle Trail trailhead in the city. The agency also operates on-call shuttle services.

== Notable people ==
- Dennis Albaugh (born 1949), owner and CEO of Albaugh Inc.
- Carmine Boal (born 1956), Iowa State Representative
- Chris Fehn (born 1972), musician and member of Slipknot
- Jeff Lamberti (born 1962), Iowa Senator and State Representative
- Joel Lanning, professional football player
- Riley Moss, professional football player
- Larry Noble, Iowa Senator
- Justin Phongsavanh, Paralympic javelin thrower
- Paul Rhoads (born 1967), Iowa State University football coach
- James Root (born 1971), guitarist
- Connie Yori (born 1963), Nebraska Cornhuskers women's basketball coach
