= Iowa State Guard =

The Iowa State Guard is the currently inactive state defense force of Iowa. The Iowa State Guard was organized during World War II in order to replace the Iowa National Guard which was federalized as a result of the war. The Iowa State Guard is recognized as a part of the organized militia of Iowa.

== History ==
In December 1941, Governor George A. Wilson ordered the organization of the Iowa State Guard. Former adjutant general of Iowa and World War I veteran, Lieutenant General Mathew A. Tinley, was assigned as the commanding officer of the Iowa State Guard. An officer corps and two regiments were organized. Each regiment consisted of 16 companies of 3 officers and 60 enlisted men, each, and a medical detachment of 5 officers and 30 enlisted men. The First Regiment was organized in the southern half of the state and the Second Regiment was organized in the northern half. A Military Police Battalion was also established.

Members included those who were rejected from federal service due to medical conditions, workers given industrial exemptions from the draft, those above the drafting age, and those men who were waiting to be drafted. These guardsmen were trained at a basic training course which lasted thirteen weeks.

The State Guard also assisted with several state emergencies, including a major fire in Dubuque, tornadoes in Sioux and Webster Counties and several western Iowa floods in 1943 and 1944.

During the summer and fall of 1945, Iowa State Guard units were deployed to quell a riot at the State Training School for Boys at Eldora and maintain order in the aftermath.

=== Disbandment ===
With the reorganization of the Iowa National Guard in 1946 and 1947, the last units of the Iowa State Guard were deactivated on 17 September 1947.

=== Other militias ===
Other units of militia were able to organize and receive a charter as a Military Order of Guard from the state of Iowa. In 1935, because African-Americans were not allowed to serve in the Iowa National Guard, the aviator John C. Robinson requested and received from the state a charter to organize a collection of black pilots and mechanics as the Military Order of Guard, Aviation Squadron.

A unit composed solely of women and girls was organized in 1943 in Davenport and consisted of roughly 150 members who received training in infantry drill, equitation, first aid, radio code, self-defense, scouting and patrolling from a captain in the Iowa State Guard.

Both of these organizations operated parallel to the Iowa State Guard. They, along with the Iowa State Guard, served as components of the Iowa organized militia as volunteer paramilitary organizations under the authority of the state of Iowa.

== Legal status ==
State defense forces are recognized by the federal government of the United States under Title 32, Section 109 of the United States Code. Iowa state law allows the Governor of Iowa to activate the Iowa State Guard when any part of the Iowa National Guard is called to active duty by the federal government of the United States.

== See also ==
- Iowa Wing Civil Air Patrol
