= Ankeny (surname) =

Ankeny is a surname. Notable people with the surname include:

- John Fletcher Ankeny (1824–1886), founder of Ankeny, Iowa
- Levi Ankeny (1844–1921), United States senator for Washington
- Marling J. Ankeny (d. 1977), American mining engineer
- Michael Ankeny (born 1991), American alpine skier
- Nesmith Ankeny (1927–1993), American mathematician
- Rachel Ankeny, professor of history and philosophy of science at University of Adelaide
- Rollin V. Ankeny (1830–1901), American soldier
