= Des Moines Area Community College =

Multi-campus college in central Iowa, US

- Motto: Life's Calling
- Type: Public community college
- Established: March 18, 1968
- Academic affiliations: Space-grant
- President: Lori Suddick Ed.D
- Academic staff: 2,000
- Students: 20,431
- Location: Ankeny, Boone, Carroll, Newton, Des Moines and West Des Moines, Iowa, United States
- Campus: Six campuses
- Colors: Blue/White
- Mascot: Bear
- Website: www.dmacc.edu
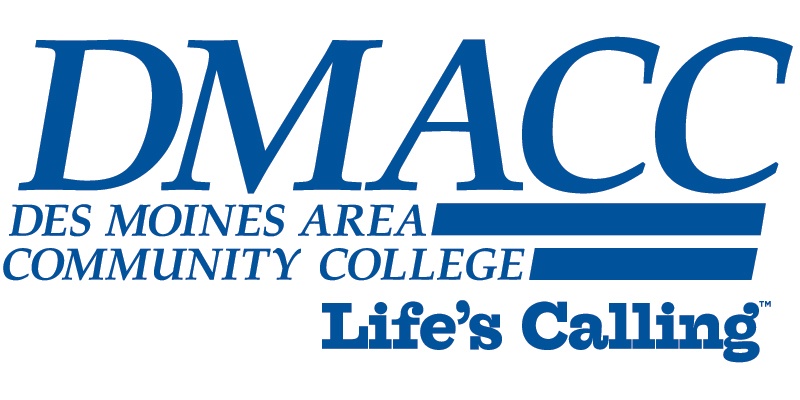

Des Moines Area Community College (DMACC) is a public community college in central Iowa. The college served 34,206 credit students and 21,164 noncredit students in 2024.

== History ==
Des Moines Area Community College was created on March 18, 1966. The first classes were held on the Ankeny Campus in 1968. DMACC has experienced tremendous growth in the last two decades. In the fall of 2000, 10,803 students were enrolled at DMACC. By the fall of 2011, that number grew to 25,425.

DMACC building

== Academics ==
DMACC is accredited by the Higher Learning Commission and approved by the Iowa State Department of Education. The college is governed by a nine-member board of directors, each representing one of the nine districts the college serves.

== Campuses ==
DMACC's primary campus is in Ankeny, a northern suburb of Des Moines. The college operates six academic campuses in total:

- Ankeny (Ankeny Campus)
- Boone (Boone Campus)
- Carroll (Carroll Campus)
- Newton (Newton Campus)
- Urban/Des Moines (Urban Campus)
- West Des Moines (West Campus)

DMACC also operates a variety of career academy and transportation programs in additional locations in Des Moines, Knoxville, Perry, and Ames.

== Athletics ==
DMACC's athletic programs are located on the Boone Campus. The DMACC Bears compete in the Iowa Community College Athletic Conference and the National Junior College Athletic Association. The Bears participate in men's baseball, men's and women's basketball, men's and women's cross country, men's and women's golf, women's softball, and women's volleyball. Men's basketball won the national championship in 2021.

== Notable alumni ==
- Bonnie Campbell, Iowa's first female Attorney General, former Iowa gubernatorial candidate, former official in the U.S. Department of Justice
- Lolo Jones, Olympian and Celebrity Big Brother contestant
- Jason Momoa, actor
- Bucky O'Connor, University of Iowa men's basketball coach 1949 to 1958
- Scott Schebler, professional baseball player
