= Ankeny Regional Airport =

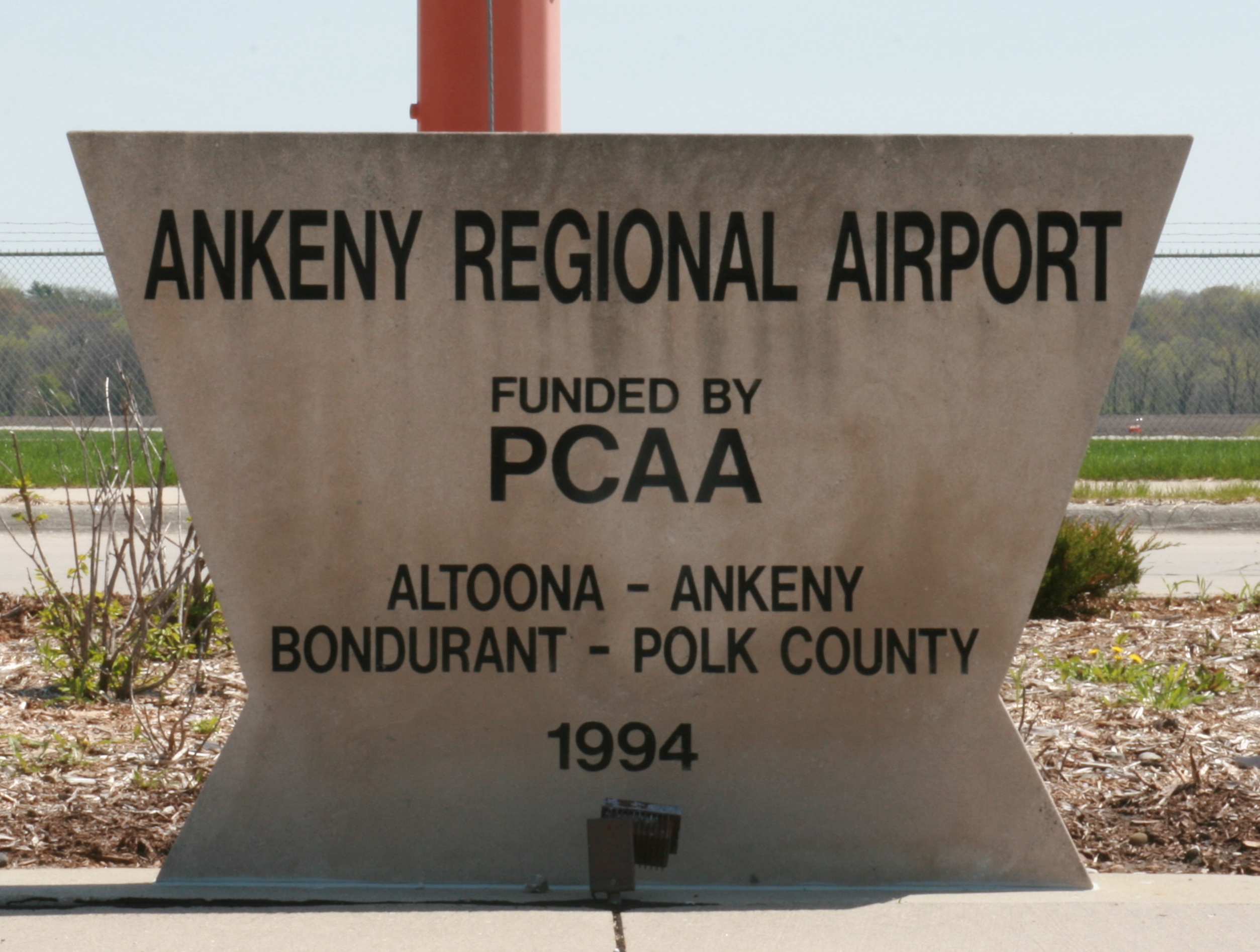
- IATA: none; ICAO: KIKV; FAA LID: IKV

Summary
- Airport type: Public
- Owner: Polk County Aviation Authority
- Serves: Ankeny, Iowa
- Elevation AMSL: 910 ft (280 m)
- Coordinates: 41°41′28″N 093°33′59″W

Map
- Location within Iowa Location within the United States

Runways
Direction	Length		Surface
Direction	ft	m	Surface
18/36	5,500	1,676	Concrete
4/22	4,200	1,280	Concrete

Statistics (2022)
- Aircraft operations (year ending 8/19/2022): 40,500
- Based aircraft: 89
- Source: Federal Aviation Administration

Ankeny Regional Airport (ICAO: KIKV, FAA LID: IKV) is a mile (2 km) southeast of Ankeny, in Polk County, Iowa. It is owned by the Polk County Aviation Authority.

== Facilities ==
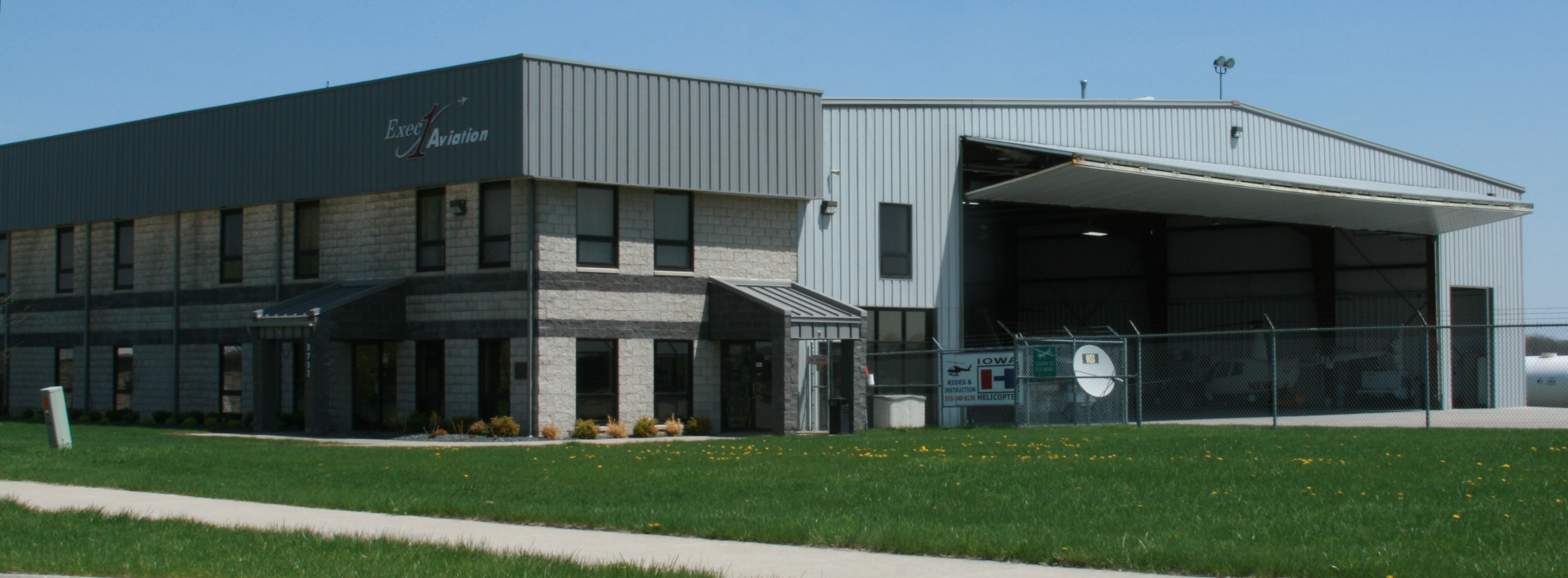
Main FBO Hangar

The airport covers 442 acres (179 ha) at an elevation of 910 feet (277 m). It has two concrete runways: 18/36 is 5,500 by 100 ft (1,676 by 30 m) and 4/22 is 4,200 by 75 ft (1,280 by 23 m). The airport opened in February 1994.

In the year ending August 19, 2022, the airport had 40,500 general aviation aircraft operations, average 111 per day. In August 2022, 89 aircraft were based at this airport: 74 single-engine, 4 multi-engine, 10 jet and 1 military.

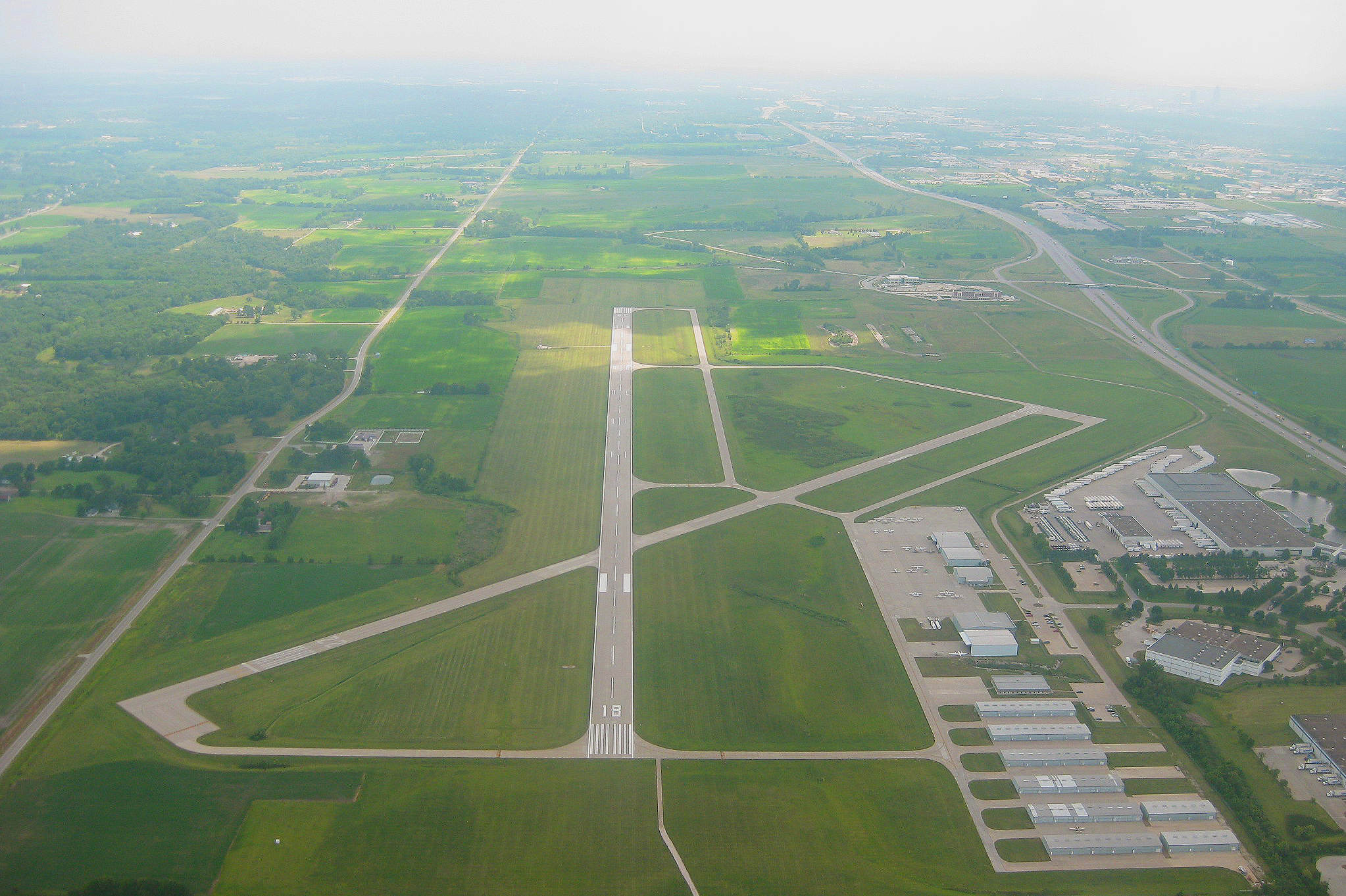
Approaching Runway 18

== Accidents and incidents ==
On February 5, 2008 a Swearingen SA-226AT Merlin IV operated by McNeely Charter Service was involved in an incident. A snowplow driver told the pilot he was clear to takeoff after he had plowed a part of the runway. As the plane began its takeoff roll, its left landing gear encountered deeper snow causing the plane to swerve to the left. The airplane was severely damaged when its nose landing gear hit a snowbank. The probable cause of the accident: the pilot failed to maintain directional control.

== See also ==
- List of airports in Iowa
