= Polk City, Iowa =

- City
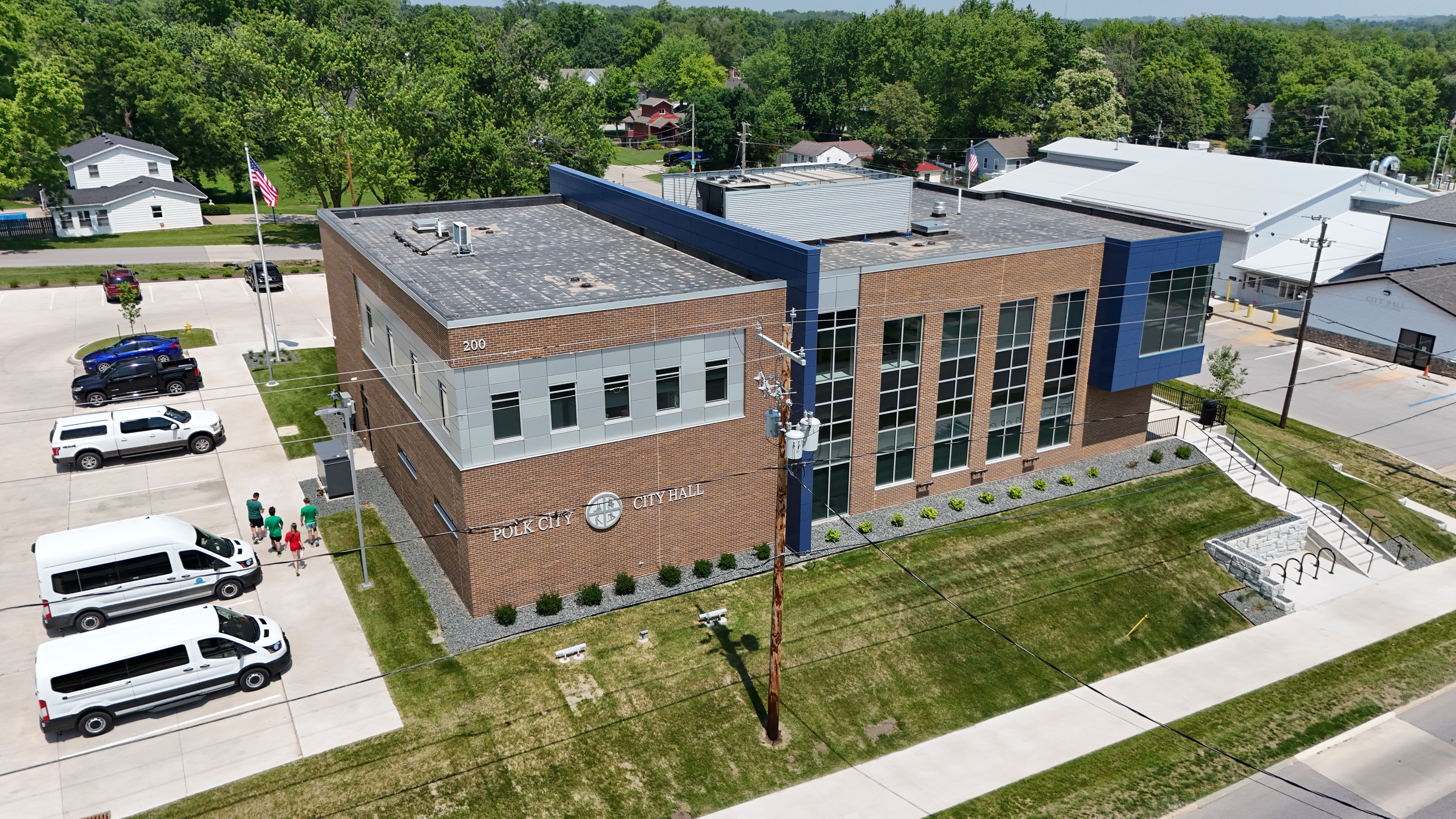
- City Hall

- Logo
- Motto: "A City For All Seasons"
- Location of Polk City, Iowa
- Coordinates: 41°46′41″N 93°42′48″W
- Country: United States
- State: Iowa
- County: Polk
- Townships: Madison, Crocker, Lincoln
- Incorporated: March 13, 1875

Area
  - Total: 5.42 sq mi (14.03 km^{2})
  - Land: 5.27 sq mi (13.65 km^{2})
  - Water: 0.15 sq mi (0.38 km^{2})
- Elevation: 843 ft (257 m)

Population (2020)
  - Total: 5,543
  - Density: 1,051.4/sq mi (405.94/km^{2})
- Time zone: UTC-6 (Central (CST))
  - Summer (DST): UTC-5 (CDT)
- ZIP code: 50226
- Area code: 515
- FIPS code: 19-64020
- GNIS feature ID: 2396245
- Website: www.polkcityia.gov

Polk City is a city in Polk County, Iowa, United States. The population was 5,543 in the 2020 census, an increase from 3,418 in 2010. It is part of the Des Moines–West Des Moines Metropolitan Statistical Area.

Polk City is located along Saylorville Lake and near Big Creek State Park.

== History ==
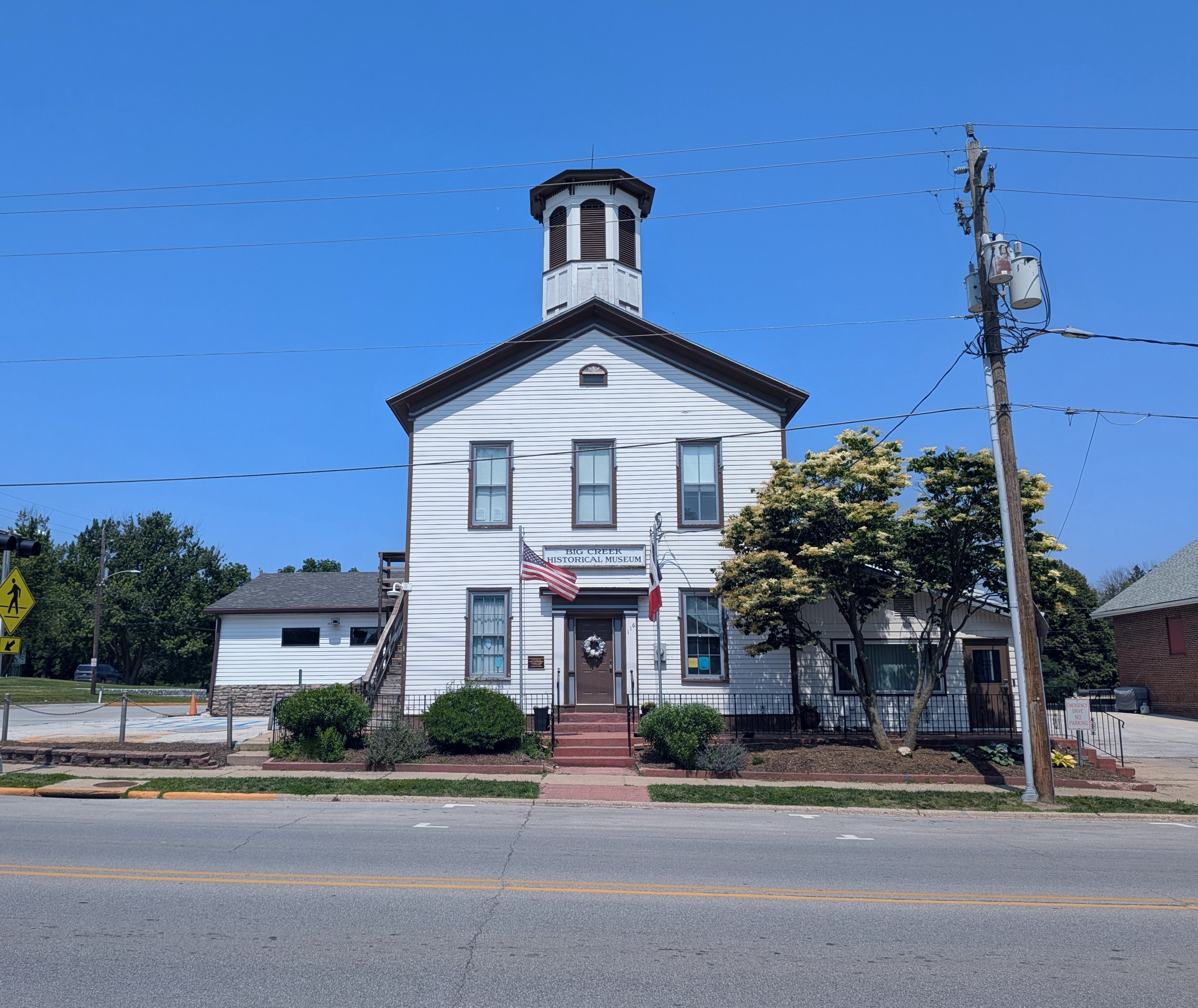
Big Creek Historical Museum in Polk City

Polk City was settled in 1846 and incorporated as a city on March 13, 1875. It was an early contender for the seat of Polk County before Des Moines was ultimately chosen. The city was named after President James K. Polk, who was president at the time of its founding. Polk City is also known for having the only "town square" in all of Polk County.

== Geography ==
According to the United States Census Bureau, the city has a total area of 4.47 square miles (11.58 km^{2}), of which 4.32 square miles (11.19 km^{2}) is land and 0.15 square miles (0.39 km^{2}) is water.

== Demographics ==
Historical population
Census	Pop.	Note	%±
1880	443		—
1890	446		0.7%
1900	438		−1.8%
1910	310		−29.2%
1920	277		−10.6%
1930	295		6.5%
1940	343		16.3%
1950	336		−2.0%
1960	567		68.8%
1970	715		26.1%
1980	1,658		131.9%
1990	1,908		15.1%
2000	2,344		22.9%
2010	3,418		45.8%
2020	5,543		62.2%
U.S. Decennial Census

=== 2020 census ===
As of the 2020 census, Polk City had a population of 5,543. There were 1,917 households and 1,521 families residing in the city. The population density was 1,051.4 inhabitants per square mile (405.9/km^{2}). There were 2,015 housing units at an average density of 382.2 per square mile (147.6/km^{2}).

The median age was 35.5 years. 34.2% of residents were under the age of 20; 3.4% were between the ages of 20 and 24; 29.2% were from 25 to 44; 22.0% were from 45 to 64; and 11.2% were 65 years of age or older. The gender makeup was 50.0% male and 50.0% female. For every 100 females, there were 100.0 males, and for every 100 females age 18 and over there were 98.8 males age 18 and over.

91.8% of residents lived in urban areas, while 8.2% lived in rural areas.

Of all households, 45.4% had children under the age of 18 living in them. Of all households, 67.2% were married-couple households, 5.9% were cohabiting-couple households, 12.4% were households with a male householder and no spouse or partner present, and 14.5% were households with a female householder and no spouse or partner present. 20.7% of households were non-families. About 16.2% of all households were made up of individuals and 4.9% had someone living alone who was 65 years of age or older.

Of all housing units, 4.9% were vacant. The homeowner vacancy rate was 3.3% and the rental vacancy rate was 4.6%.

Racial composition as of the 2020 census
Race	Number	Percent
White	5,211	94.0%
Black or African American	35	0.6%
American Indian and Alaska Native	7	0.1%
Asian	37	0.7%
Native Hawaiian and Other Pacific Islander	7	0.1%
Some other race	20	0.4%
Two or more races	226	4.1%
Hispanic or Latino (of any race)	111	2.0%

=== 2010 census ===
As of the census of 2010, there were 3,418 people, 1,232 households, and 957 families living in the city. The population density was 791.2 inhabitants per square mile (305.5/km^{2}). There were 1,276 housing units at an average density of 295.4 per square mile (114.1/km^{2}). The racial makeup of the city was 97.2% White, 0.8% African American, 0.2% Native American, 0.4% Asian, 0.2% from other races, and 1.1% from two or more races. Hispanic or Latino of any race were 0.9% of the population.

There were 1,232 households, of which 43.8% had children under the age of 18 living with them, 66.3% were married couples living together, 7.3% had a female householder with no husband present, 4.1% had a male householder with no wife present, and 22.3% were non-families. 17.1% of all households were made up of individuals, and 4.5% had someone living alone who was 65 years of age or older. The average household size was 2.73 and the average family size was 3.11.

The median age in the city was 34.4 years. 30.5% of residents were under the age of 18; 5.7% were between the ages of 18 and 24; 30.7% were from 25 to 44; 25.4% were from 45 to 64; and 7.7% were 65 years of age or older. The gender makeup of the city was 50.0% male and 50.0% female.

=== 2000 census ===
As of the census of 2000, there were 2,344 people, 826 households, and 645 families living in the city. The population density was 862.4 inhabitants per square mile (333.0/km^{2}). There were 842 housing units at an average density of 309.8 per square mile (119.6/km^{2}). The racial makeup of the city was 98.08% White, 0.30% African American, 0.26% Native American, 0.30% Asian, 0.34% from other races, and 0.73% from two or more races. Hispanic or Latino of any race were 0.68% of the population.

There were 826 households, out of which 43.2% had children under the age of 18 living with them, 70.5% were married couples living together, 5.6% had a female householder with no husband present, and 21.8% were non-families. 15.7% of all households were made up of individuals, and 5.1% had someone living alone who was 65 years of age or older. The average household size was 2.76 and the average family size was 3.15.

28.5% are under the age of 18, 6.4% from 18 to 24, 33.8% from 25 to 44, 22.8% from 45 to 64, and 8.5% who were 65 years of age or older. The median age was 34 years. For every 100 females, there were 99 males. For every 100 females age 18 and over, there were 97.3 males.

The median income for a household in the city was $58,000, and the median income for a family was $64,688. Males had a median income of $41,875 versus $27,863 for females. The per capita income for the city was $23,476, and About 2.0% of families and 2.4% of the population were below the poverty line, including 1.4% of those under age 18 and 15.6% of those aged 65 or over.

== Notable people ==
- Derald Langham (1913–1991), agricultural geneticist

== Education ==
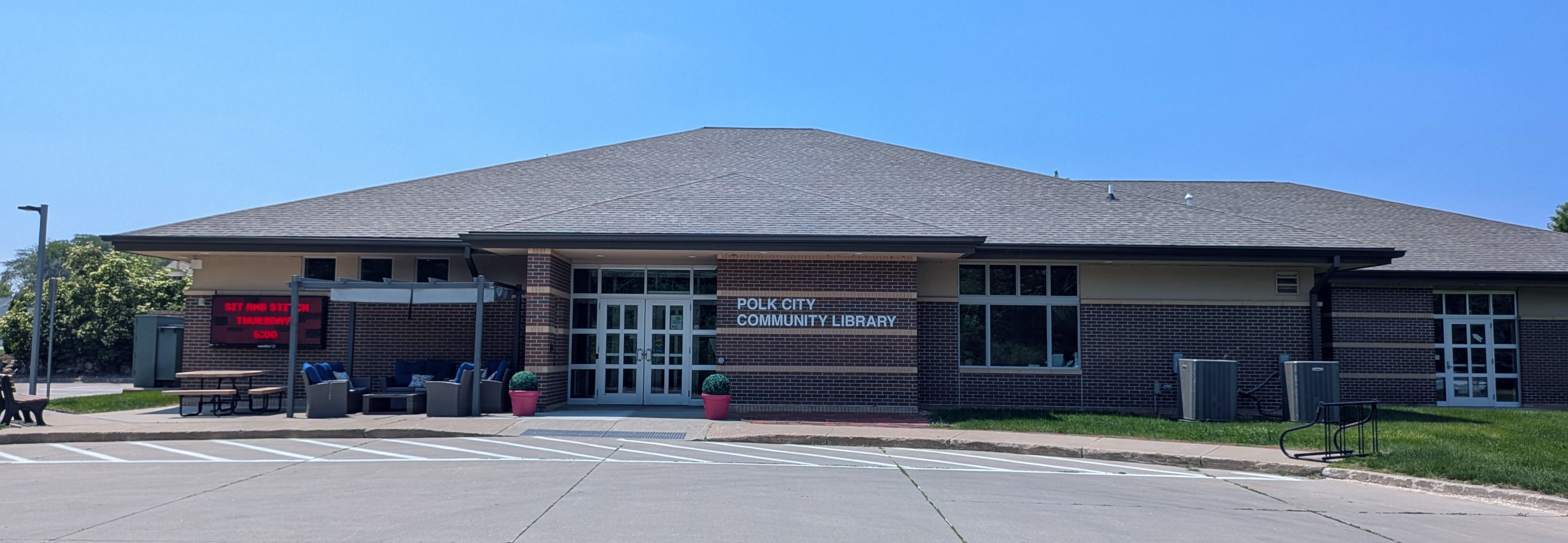
Polk City library

North Polk Community School District serves almost all of the city. Polk City is home to North Polk West Elementary, which educates children age 3 through grade 2. Grades 3-5 students attend Big Creek Elementary in northeast Polk City, 6-8 graders attend the North Polk Middle school and 9-12 graders attend North Polk High School, both of which are in Alleman, which is roughly 8.5 miles away.

A small section of the city limits extends into the Ankeny Community School District.
