= John Fletcher Ankeny =

Founder of Ankeny, Iowa

- Born: May 6, 1824; Somerset County, Pennsylvania
- Died: 1886 (aged 61–62); Florida

John Fletcher Ankeny (1824-1886) is best known as the founder of Ankeny, Iowa. He was the oldest child of Joseph and Harriet Giese Ankeny. He was born in Somerset County, Pennsylvania on May 6, 1824 on the farm owned by his father and his grandfather, Peter Ankeny. Peter was one of the founders of Somerset, Pennsylvania. When Ankeny was seven years old, his father moved the family from Somerset, Pennsylvania to Millersburg, Ohio.

== Biography ==
Ankeny studied medicine with Dr. Jacob Voorhees and attended medical college in Cincinnati. He started his medical practice with Dr. McNeal at Canal Dover, Ohio. He later practiced his profession in Kenton, Ohio and also served as postmaster there.

In 1849, he went to California, together with his brother, Henry Giese Ankeny. They participated in mining for gold. Ankeny also performed physician duties and he became Clerk of the first legislature of the state of California. He visited the Hawaiian Islands.

He returned to Ohio and he married Miss Sarah (Sally) Wolgamot in Millersburg, Ohio in 1856. They established residence and farmed in Stephenson County, Illinois. Four daughters were born to them in Illinois.

Ankeny was associated with the Lincoln campaign in 1860 and was elected to the Illinois legislature.

Ankeny’s family, his parents, brothers and wives, sisters and husbands all moved to Iowa during the 1860s. Ankeny moved from Illinois to Des Moines, Iowa in 1869. He became a Des Moines city council member in 1872.

Ankeny was a promoter and stockholder of the Minnesota Narrow Gauge Railroad. He and his wife Sarah purchased 80-acres of land north of Des Moines where the railroad was to traverse. The land was platted and officially became the town of Ankeny on April 19, 1875. On that land he built a rooming house and hotel and the town’s first store. He also built a house. The Ankeny family never lived in the town named after him. They continued to live in the city of Des Moines.

When the narrow gauge railroad became extinct, Ankeny looked to Florida for land development.

In 1883, Ankeny purchased a large tract of land along the Indian River and founded the town of Ankona, Florida in Brevard County (now St. Lucie County) Florida, where he started a pineapple plantation. He maintained a residence in Des Moines, Iowa. His nephew, Rollin V. Ankeny and his wife, Edythe, moved to Ankona. His grandson, Fletcher Ankeny Russell lived in Ankona. The Indian River Drive homes built and lived in by Rollin Ankeny and Fletcher Russell are on the list of historical homes.

In 1886, Ankeny died while in Florida.
