= Ankeny Building =

- U.S. National Register of Historic Places
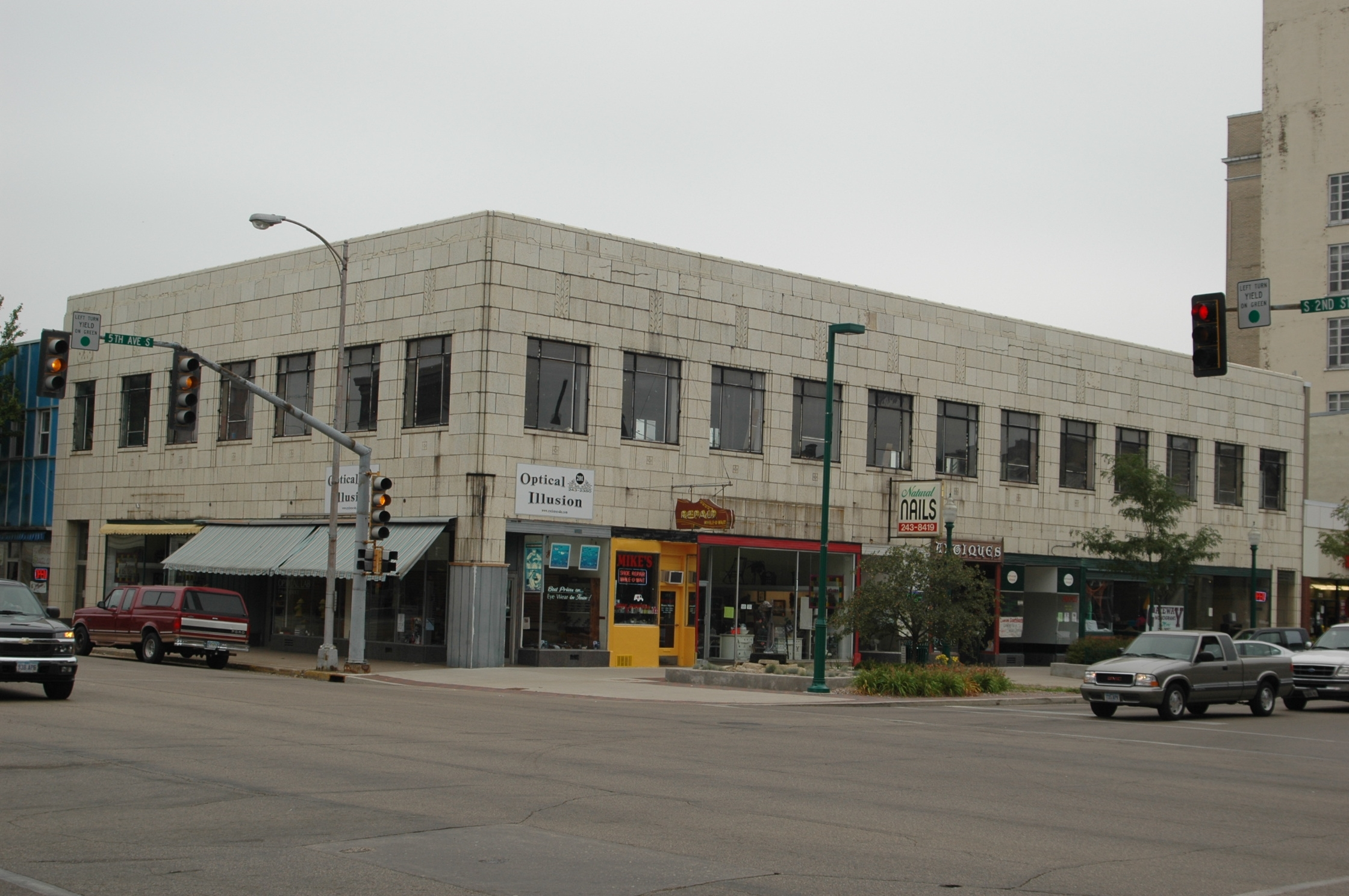

- Location within Iowa Location within the United States
- Location: 201 5th Ave., S. Clinton, Iowa
- Coordinates: 41°50′34″N 90°11′18″W
- Built: 1931
- Architect: Harold Holmes
- Architectural style: Art Deco
- MPS: Clinton, Iowa MPS
- NRHP reference No.: 06000105
- Added to NRHP: March 2, 2006

The Ankeny Building is a historic structure located in downtown Clinton, Iowa. Chicago architect Harold Holmes designed the building in the Art Deco style. It was built by Daniel Haring in 1931. The exterior is covered with cream-colored terra cotta panels. The windows on the second floor are examples of the Chicago school and they are composed of steel and glass. It was listed on the National Register of Historic Places in 2006.
