= North Polk Community School District =

Public school district in Alleman, Iowa, United States

Coordinates: 41.816053°N 93.614003°W

Location
- Alleman, Iowa Polk, Boone, and Story counties United States
- Coordinates: 41.816053, -93.614003

District information
- Type: Public
- Grades: K-12
- Superintendent: Michael Kline
- Schools: 5
- Budget: $27,012,000 (2020-21)
- NCES District ID: 1920910

Students and staff
- Students: 2280 (2023-24)
- Teachers: 137.55 FTE
- Staff: 148.42 FTE
- Student–teacher ratio: 16.31
- Athletic conference: Raccoon River Conference
- District mascot: Comets
- Colors: Red and Black and Silver

Other information
- Website: northpolk.org

The North Polk Community School District is a rural public school district headquartered in Alleman, Iowa.

Almost all of the district is in Polk County, with small sections in Boone and Story counties. It includes the municipalities of Alleman, a small portion of Ankeny, Elkhart, and Sheldahl as well as almost all of Polk City. It also includes the surrounding rural area. Alleman is located approximately halfway (five miles north of Ankeny) between Des Moines and Ames.

== Schools ==
The district operates five schools:

- North Polk Central Elementary School, Alleman
- North Polk West Elementary School, Polk City
- North Polk Big Creek Elementary School, Polk City
- North Polk Middle School, Alleman
- North Polk High School, Alleman

=== North Polk High School ===
==== Athletics ====
- Boys - Baseball, Basketball, Color Guard, Cross Country, Football, Golf, Soccer, Swimming, Tennis, Track and Field, Winter Guard Wrestling
- Girls - Basketball, Cheerleading, Color Guard, Cross Country, Dance, Golf, Soccer, Swimming, Tennis, Track and Field, Volleyball, Winter Guard, Wrestling

===== State championships =====
- Baseball: 2014 (2A), 2024 (3A)
- Boys' Basketball: 1996 Class 2A
- Football: 2024 Class 4A
- Girl’s Soccer: 2026 Class 2A State Champions
- Softball: 4 time State Champions (1975 (Fall), 2000 (1A), 2006 (2A), 2008 (2A))
- Girls' Track and Field: 2008 - Class 2A

==== Activities ====
Concert Band, Concert Choir, Jazz Band, Jazz Choir, Marching Band, Musical Production, Play Production, Speech Team, Future Farmers of America, NPHS Key Club, National Honor Society, National Spanish Honor Society, NPHS Student Council

== Enrollment ==
View source data.

== See also ==
- List of school districts in Iowa
- List of high schools in Iowa
