= Elkhart Township, Polk County, Iowa =

Township in Iowa, United States

Coordinates: 41.82°N 93.52°W

Elkhart Township is a township in Polk County, Iowa, United States.

== History ==
Elkhart Township was organized in 1851. It was named by a citizen who hailed from Elkhart County, Indiana.
