= Code of Iowa =

Statutory laws of the U.S. state of Iowa

The Code of Iowa contains the statutory laws of the U.S. state of Iowa. The Iowa Legislative Service Agency is a non-partisan governmental agency that organizes, updates, and publishes the Iowa Code. It is republished in full every odd year, and is supplemented in even years.

== External reference ==
- Iowa Code online at Iowa General Assembly.
- Legislative Services Agency
- Iowa Online Law Reference
