= Iowa Highway 415 =

Highway in Iowa

Iowa Highway 415
- Iowa 415 highlighted in red

Route information
- Maintained by Iowa DOT
- Length: 16.856 mi (27.127 km)
- Existed: 1959–present

Major junctions
- South end: US 6 in Des Moines
- I-35 / I-80 in Des Moines
- North end: Iowa 141 near Granger

Location
- Country: United States
- State: Iowa
- Counties: Polk

Highway system
- Iowa Primary Highway System; Interstate; US; State; Secondary; Scenic
← Iowa 404	→ Iowa 438

Iowa Highway 415 is a short state highway that runs mostly north-to-south in central Iowa. Iowa 415 begins at U.S. Highway 6 in Des Moines and ends at Iowa Highway 141 east of Granger. Prior to 2003, Iowa 415 extended north from Polk City and ended at Iowa Highway 17 south of Madrid. Now, Iowa 415 turns west at Polk City and crosses the Des Moines River at Saylorville Lake prior to ending at Iowa 141. Since the rerouting in 2003, the northern terminus for Iowa 415 is now farther south than its northernmost point in Polk City.

== Route description ==
Iowa Highway 415 begins at an intersection with U.S. Highway 6, which runs along Euclid Avenue, in Des Moines. Iowa 415 heads north along Second Avenue through Des Moines' Highland Park neighborhood. It exits Des Moines and enters Saylor Township, where it passes a Firestone Tire and Rubber Company factory and intersects Interstate 35 / Interstate 80. Iowa 415 continues north as a four-lane divided highway and passes the Margo Frankel Woods State Park. Just east of Saylorville, Iowa 415 intersects NE 66 Avenue at a diamond interchange.

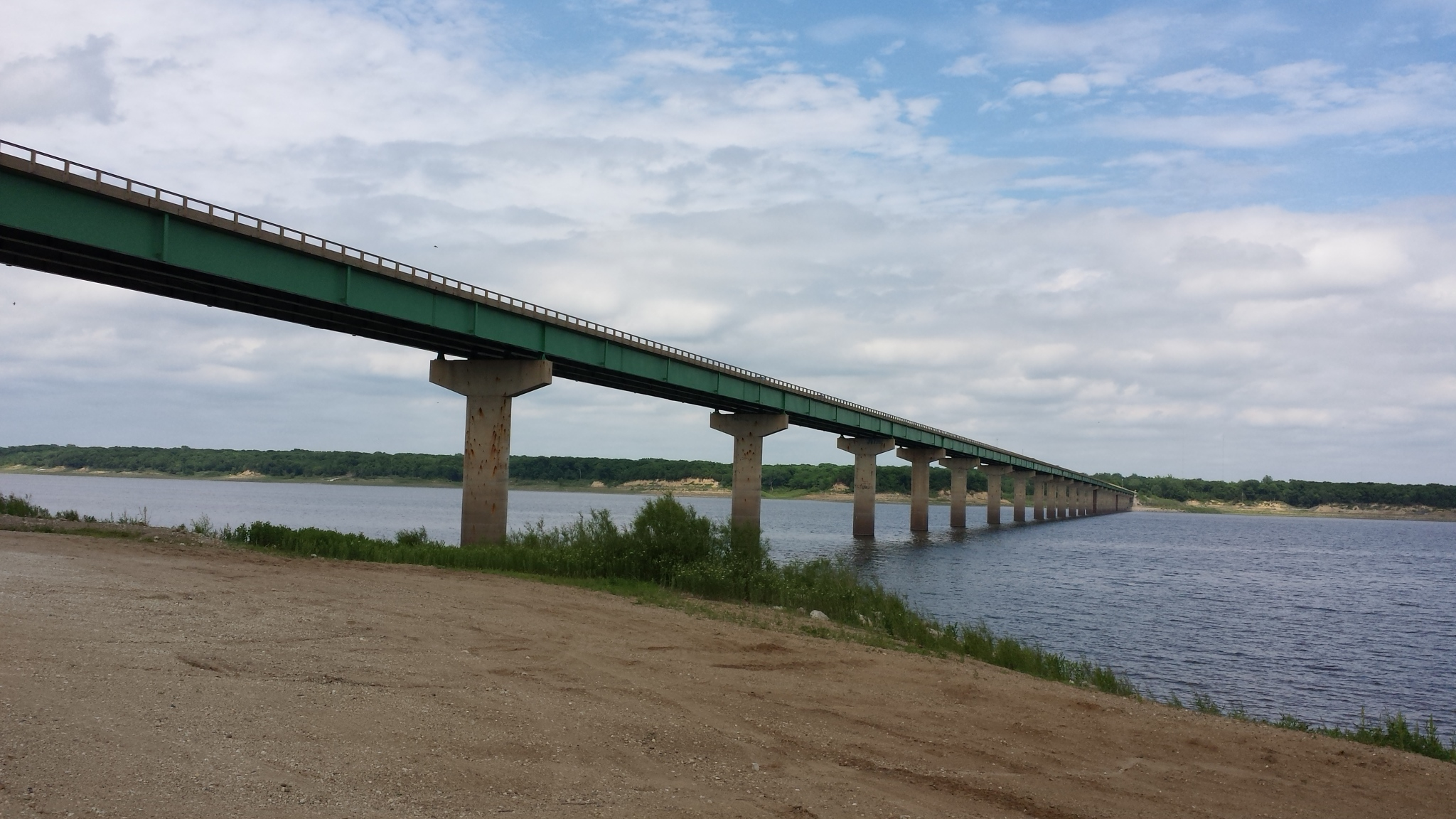
Iowa 415 crosses Saylorville Lake over the Mile Long Bridge

On the southern edge of Ankeny, Iowa 415 turns west at the intersection of State Street and Oralabor Road, which is also the western end of Iowa Highway 160. The highway goes west for 2 miles (3.2 km) before turning to the north and reaching the access road to the Saylorville Lake causeway. Iowa 415 stays about one mile (1.6 km) east and north of Saylorville Lake coast, following the general northwest angle of the lake. Along the northern coast of the lake, Iowa 415 provides marina and beach access for those seeking recreation.

At Polk City, Iowa 415 turns to the west along West Bridge Road, which becomes NW 112 Avenue as it leaves Polk City and turns to the southwest. NW 112 Avenue crosses Saylorville Lake over the Mile Long Bridge. Northbound Iowa 415, heading southwest, intersects NW Beaver Drive just west of the western coast. It continues south and west for 1 1/2 miles (2.4 km) where it ends at a trumpet interchange with Iowa Highway 141 in Jefferson Township, east of Granger.

== History ==
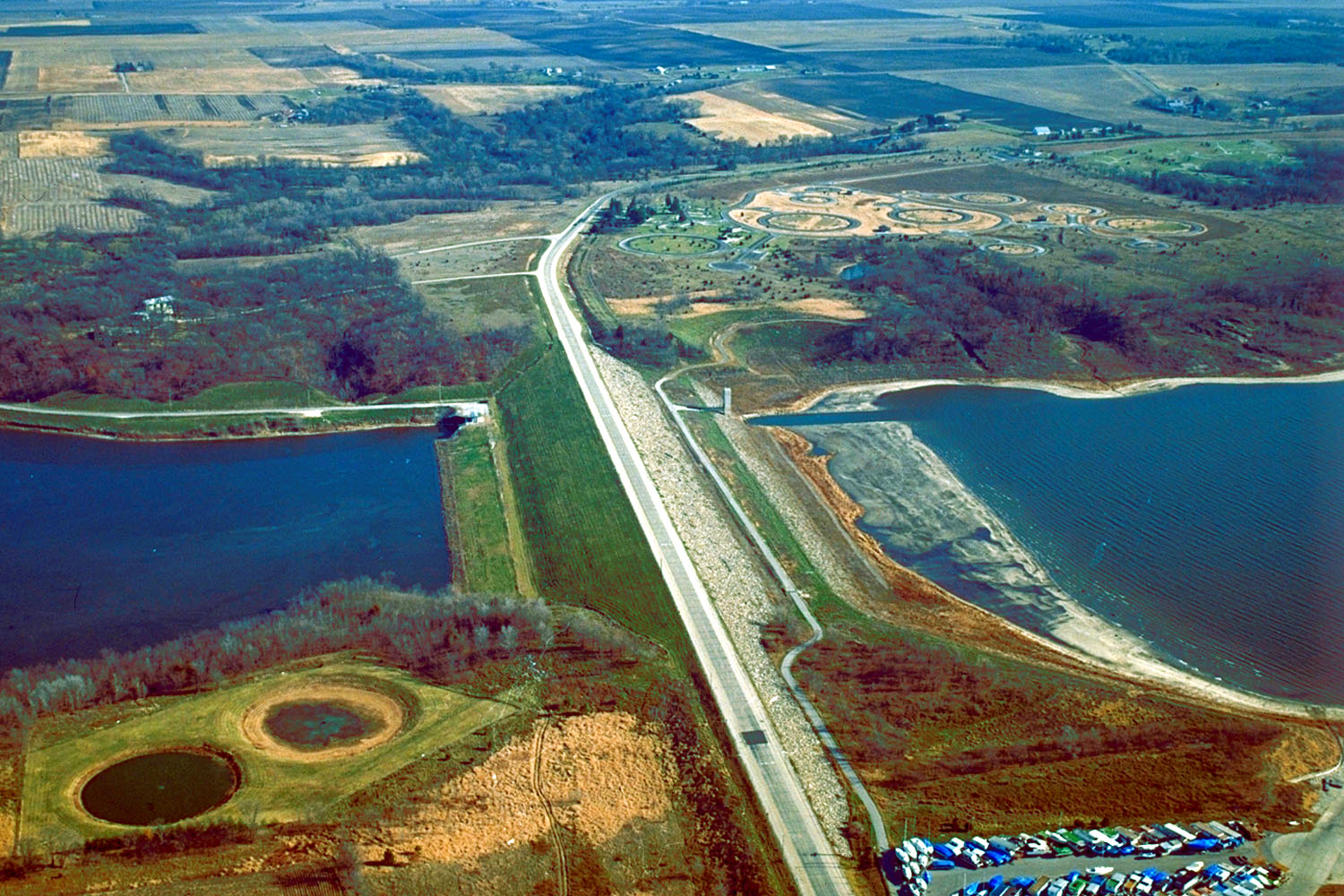
Iowa 415 crosses the Barrier Dam on the northern edge of Saylorville Lake

Iowa Highway 415 was designated in 1959, first appearing on state maps in 1960, as a spur route from Des Moines to Polk City. It was created from an abandoned segment of Iowa Highway 60, which had been relocated to the west. In the early 1980s, it was extended north from Polk City to 2 miles (3.2 km) south of Madrid, on Iowa Highway 17. This route stayed the same until 2003 when it was rerouted from Polk City across Saylorville Lake to a new interchange at Iowa Highway 141.

== Major intersections ==
The entire route is in Polk County.

Location	mi	km	Destinations	Notes
Des Moines	0.000	0.000	US 6 (Euclid Avenue)	Southern terminus; road continues as 2nd Avenue
Saylor Township	1.504	2.420	I-35 / I-80 – Kansas City, Council Bluffs, Minneapolis, Davenport	Exit 135 on I-80
Saylorville	3.632	5.845	Easter Seals Camp	Exit removed in 2020 and replaced with intersection
Ankeny	5.213	8.390	Iowa 160 east (Oralabor Road) to I-35 north	Western terminus of Iowa 160
Jefferson Township	7.927	12.757	Dragoon Trail south (NW 84th Avenue)	Southern end of Dragoon Trail overlap
Polk City	13.054	21.008	Dragoon Trail north (3rd Street)	Northern end of Dragoon Trail overlap; former Iowa 415 north
Jefferson Township	16.856	27.127	Iowa 141 – Perry, Des Moines	Exit 148 on Iowa 141; northern terminus
1.000 mi = 1.609 km; 1.000 km = 0.621 mi: Closed/former; Concurrency terminus
