= Iowa Highway 160 =

Highway in Iowa

Iowa Highway 160
- Oralabor Road
- Iowa 160 highlighted in red

Route information
- Maintained by Iowa DOT
- Length: 2.446 mi (3.936 km)
- Existed: 1947–present

Major junctions
- West end: Iowa 415 in Ankeny
- US 69 in Ankeny
- East end: I-35 in Ankeny

Location
- Country: United States
- State: Iowa
- Counties: Polk

Highway system
- Iowa Primary Highway System; Interstate; US; State; Secondary; Scenic
← Iowa 152	→ Iowa 163

Iowa Highway 160 (Iowa 160) is a short state highway that runs east and west in central Iowa. Its begins at Iowa 415 in Ankeny and ends at exit 90 of Interstate 35 (I-35) in Ankeny. Originally ending at a Y intersection, south of the current intersection with Iowa 415, the route has been straightened to run west and east. Iowa 160 passes Des Moines Area Community College near its intersection with U.S. Highway 69 (US 69).

== Route description ==
Iowa 160 begins at an intersection with Iowa 415 in southwestern Ankeny. Iowa 415 comes from the south and the west, Iowa 160 begins heading east, and Ankeny's State Street continues north. Iowa 160, known locally as Oralabor Road, passes to the south of the main campus of Des Moines Area Community College (DMACC). A short while later, it intersects US 69, also known as Ankeny Boulevard. Continuing east, it enters a dense commercial area of Ankeny. It passes beneath a pedestrian bridge built in 2022 as an extension of the High Trestle Trail. Just 0.3 miles (480 m) from its eastern end, it intersects Delaware Avenue, a north–south street which diverts retail traffic exiting from I-35 just to the east. Iowa 160 ends at an interchange, exit 90, with I-35.

== History ==
Iowa 160 was designated in 1947 as a diagonal connector route from Iowa 60, now Iowa 415, to US 69. The roadway was originally constructed in 1942 as a connector to the Des Moines Ordnance Plant. It was built by the Iowa State Highway Commission, but the entire costs were borne by the federal government as part of the war effort. In 1961, work began on reconstructing the intersection with Iowa 60 into a "one-level interchange", which provided each traffic movement a dedicated lane.

That intersection was reworked starting in 1984 as the state highway commission, now the Iowa Department of Transportation (Iowa DOT), and United States Army Corps of Engineers (Corps) sought to improve the connection between I-35 and Iowa 415 and recreation areas near Saylorville Lake and Big Creek State Park. The plans would also move the intersection of Iowa 415 and Iowa 160 farther north from its location at the time and it would become a T intersection. On July 1, 1980, the Iowa DOT took over a one-mile (1.6 km) segment of Oralabor Road between US 69 and I-35 and applied the Iowa 160 designation to it. Through most of 1985, the Oralabor Road interchange on I-35 was closed for reconstruction. That same year, Oralabor Road was widened to four lanes between US 69 and Delaware Avenue. As part of the Iowa 415 connection project, the Corps spent $9.95 million (equivalent to $23.5 million in 2023) on building the new intersection and relocating the two state highways. The new Iowa 415/Iowa 160 intersection was completed in early 1986 and both highways were realigned onto to their current roadways.

== Major intersections ==
The entire route is in Ankeny, Polk County.

mi	km	Destinations	Notes
0.000	0.000	Iowa 415	
1.086	1.748	US 69 (Ankeny Boulevard)	
2.084	3.354	Delaware Avenue	
2.446	3.936	I-35 (Exit 90)	
1.000 mi = 1.609 km; 1.000 km = 0.621 mi
