= Big Creek Lake (Iowa) =

- Location within Iowa Location within the United States
- Location: Big Creek State Park, Polk City, Iowa
- Coordinates: 41°48′43″N 93°44′28″W
- Type: Lake
- Basin countries: United States
- Surface area: 814 acres (329 ha)
- Average depth: 17.3 ft (5.3 m)
- Max. depth: 167 ft (51 m)
- Surface elevation: 920 ft (280 m)

Big Creek Lake is a lake situated in the Big Creek State Park in Polk County, Iowa. The lake is situated two miles to the north of Polk City, spreads across 814 acres (329 ha), and its mean depth is 17.3 feet (5.3 m) (maximum 51 feet (16 m) deep). The lake's purpose was to protect Polk City from floods. It was a part of the Saylorville project. It provides numerous recreational options including fishing, picnicking, swimming, boating, camping, and others.

== Hunting ==
Hunting is not allowed in many regions of the state park because of it being a wildlife refuge. However, hunting on the lake and some other designated areas is allowed and are marked with public hunting signs. Popular animals for hunting include pheasants, rabbit, deer, and squirrel.

== Fishing ==
The Big Creek Lake provides fishing options all year-round. The most common catches at the lake include crappie, bluegill, largemouth bass, walleye, channel catfish and muskie. In 2012, a physical fish barrier was put up by the U.S. Army Corps of Engineers, the Iowa Department of Natural Resources and some local fishing organizations. The purpose of the barrier was to stock adult walleye and muskellunge because of a large-scale loss of the species in the lake from 2007 through 2010.

== Boating facilities ==
Boats of all sizes can be operated in the lake. There are a total of six ramps on the lake including three on the west, two on the east, and one hazel ramp on the upper end.
