= Saylor, Iowa =

- unincorporated community
- Location within Iowa Location within the United States
- Country: United States
- State: Iowa
- County: Polk
- Elevation: 958 ft (292 m)
- Time zone: UTC-6 (Central (CST))
  - Summer (DST): UTC-5 (CDT)
- Area code: 515
- GNIS feature ID: 464734

Saylor (also known as Marquisville) is an unincorporated community in Polk County, Iowa, United States.

== History ==
Saylor took its name from Saylor Township. The post office in Saylor was called Marquisville. The Marquisville post office operated from 1892 until 1907.

Saylor's population was 25 in 1925.
