= Enterprise, Iowa =

- Unincorporated community
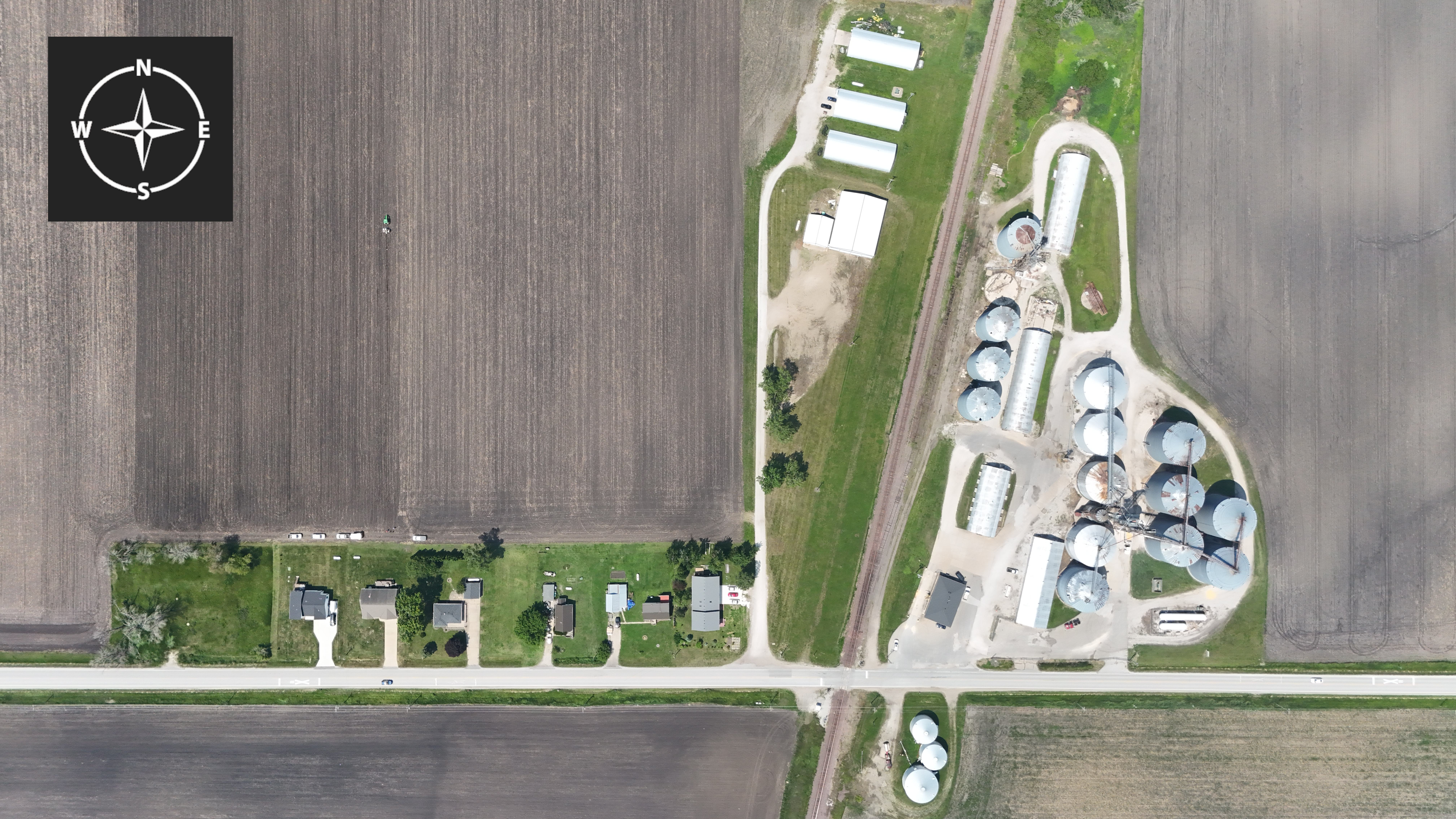
- An aerial photo of Enterprise, taken on June 10, 2025

- Location within Iowa Location within the United States
- Coordinates: 41°43′55″N 93°31′49″W
- Country: United States
- State: Iowa
- County: Polk
- Township: Douglas
- Elevation: 1,004 ft (306 m)
- Time zone: UTC-6 (Central (CST))
  - Summer (DST): UTC-5 (CDT)
- Area code: 515
- GNIS feature ID: 456382

Enterprise is an unincorporated community in Polk County, Iowa, United States. Enterprise is located in Douglas Township. The state capital and county seat of Des Moines is located slightly less than 10 miles away.

== History ==
With the discovery of a large vein of coal just a few miles east of Ankeny, The Des Moines Coal & Mining Company (later renamed to the Enterprise Coal Company) would open Enterprise Mine No. 1 in 1903. As more workers arrived, a town was quickly set up to accommodate the miners and their families. Drivers were paid $1.75 per day, common laborers earned between $1.50 and $1.60 per day, and miners would earn $1.25 per ton. The town would expand further with the opening of Mine No. 2 in 1907, about a half mile to the south of the town. In 1914, the Enterprise Coal Company was ranked as one of the top 24 coal producers in the state. The vein would eventually run dry, and in 1919 Enterprise would be shut down as a coal mining town. Many of the workers moved to Ankeny, and began new lives farming the surrounding area or working for the numerous stores in the town's center. The population was 35 in 1940.
