= Tornadoes of 1986 =

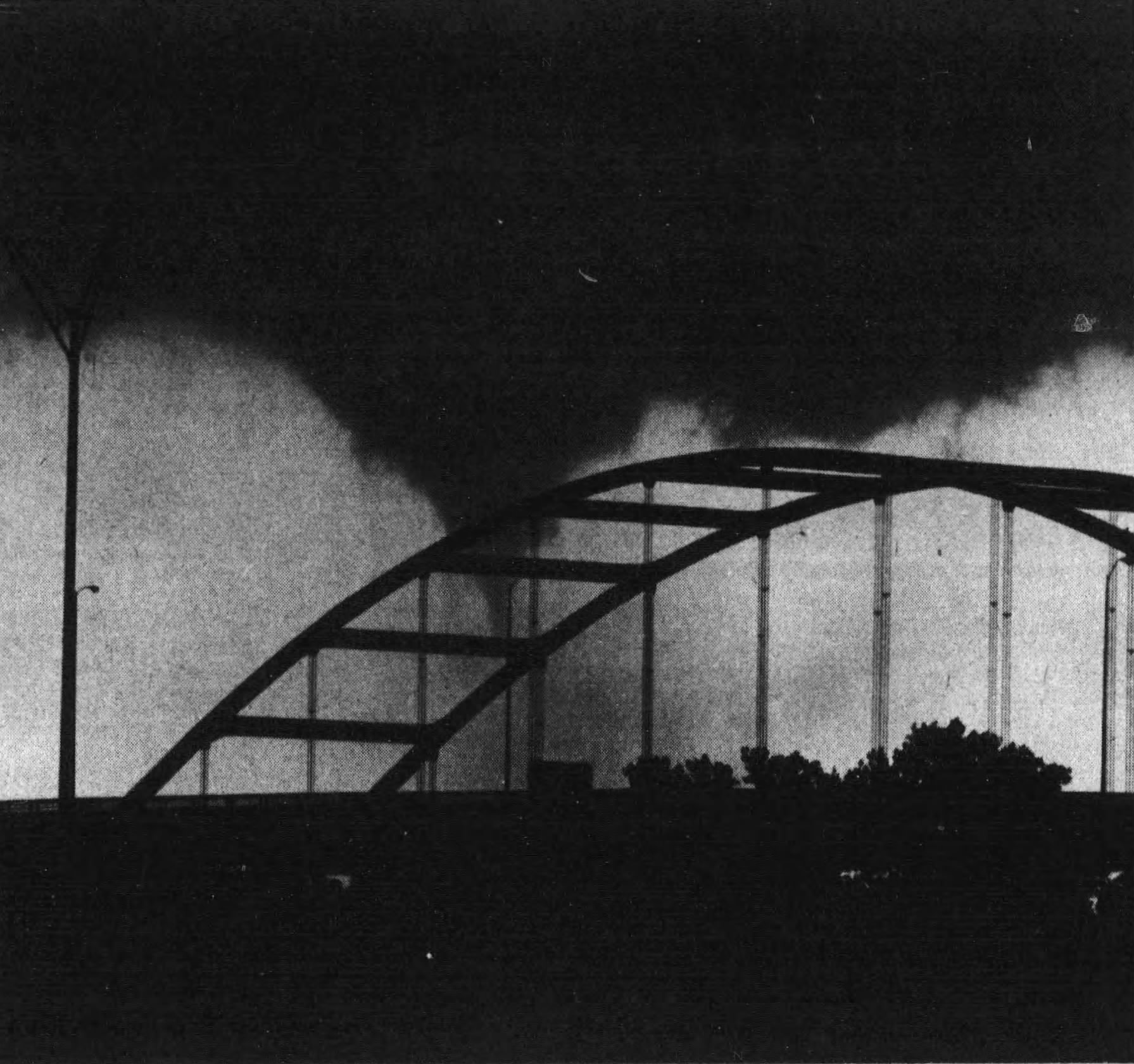
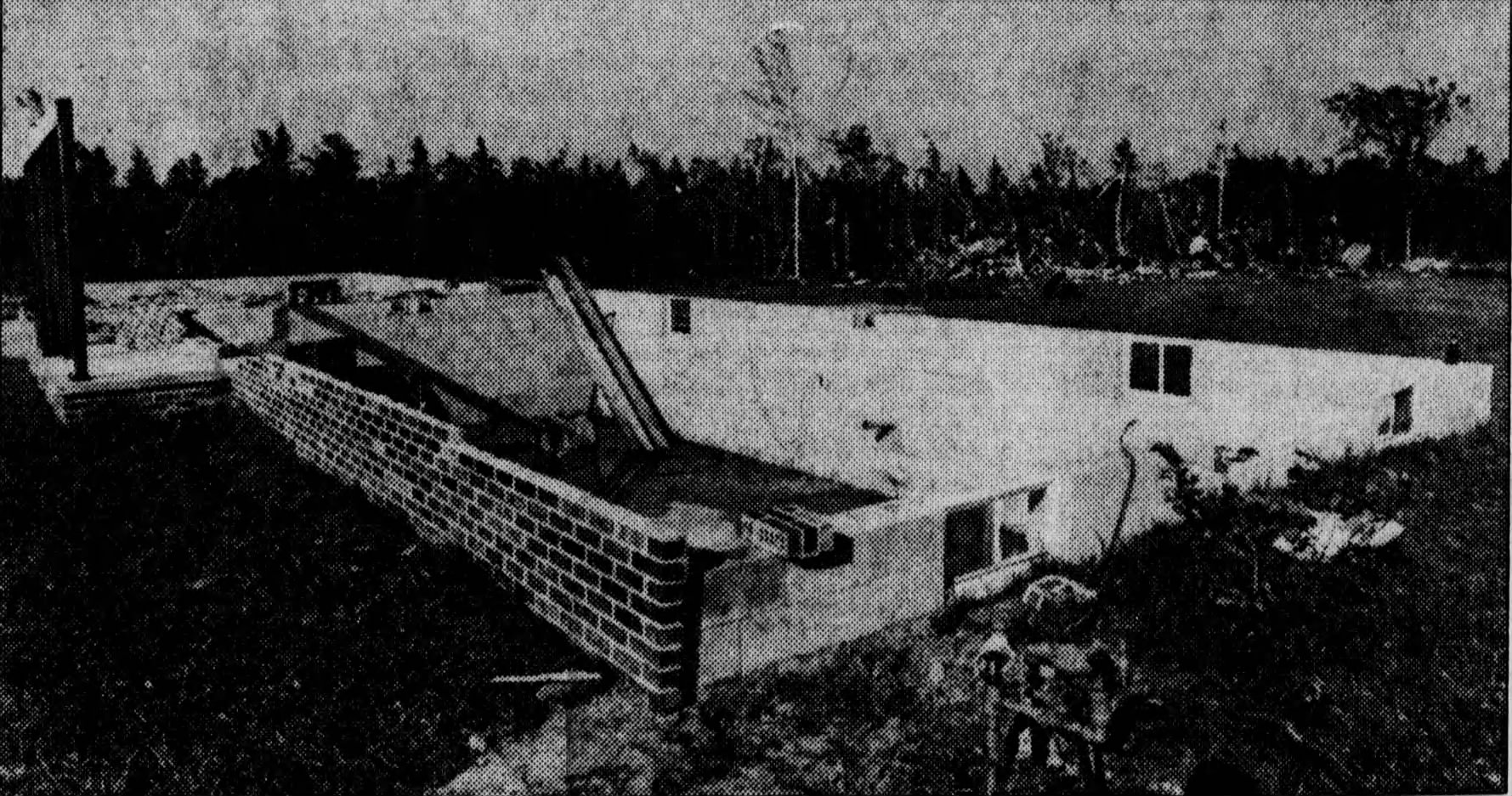
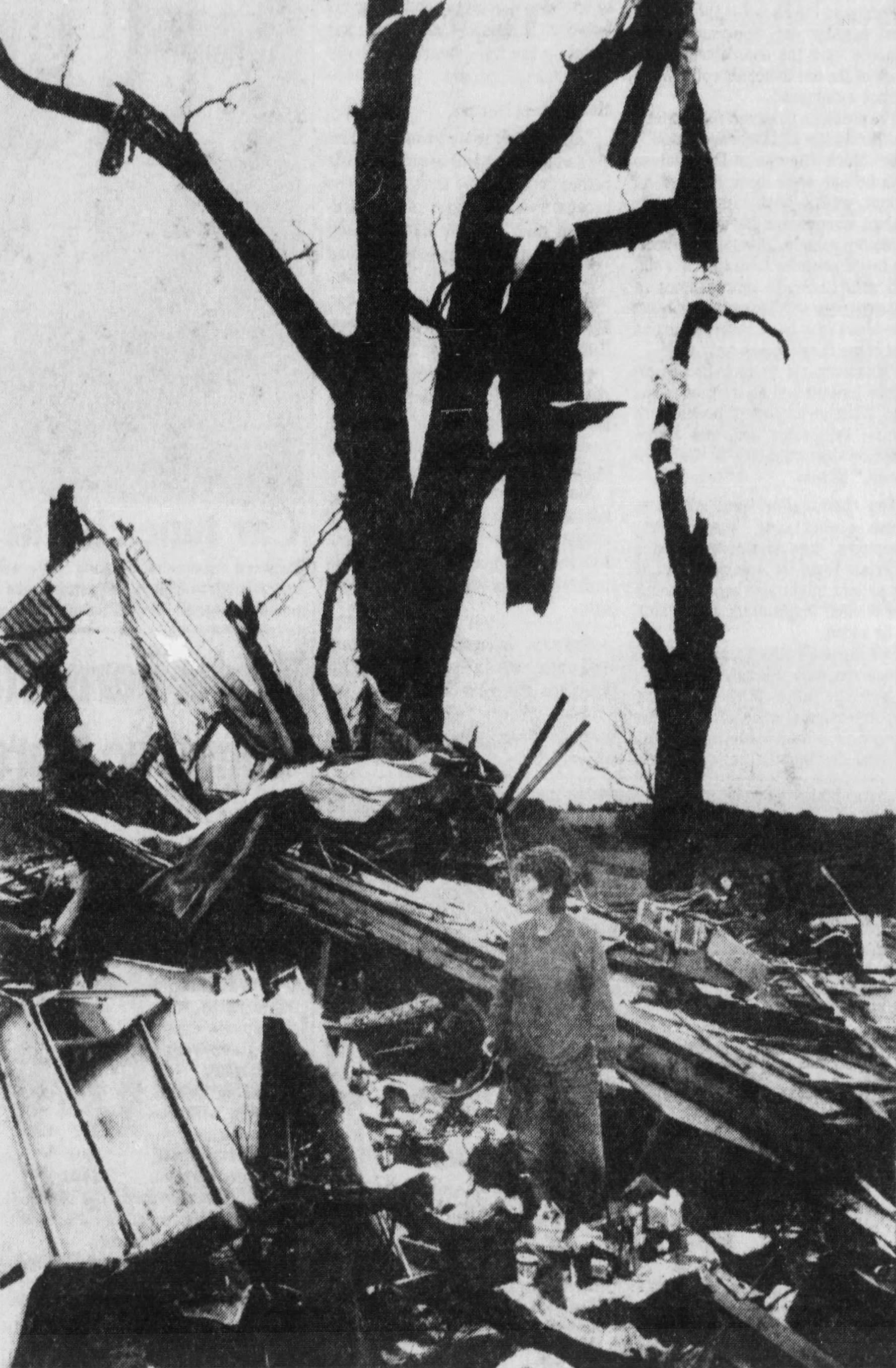
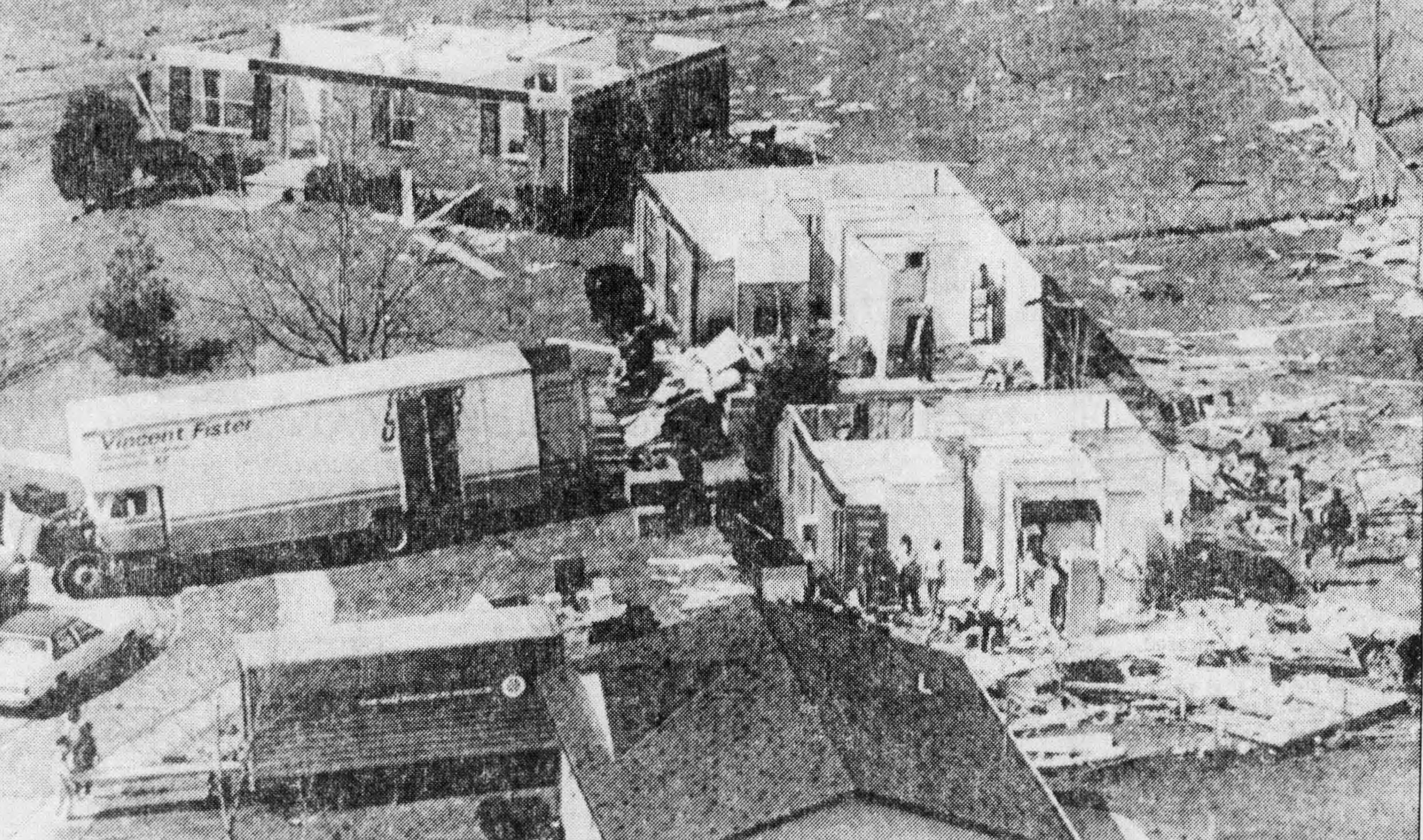
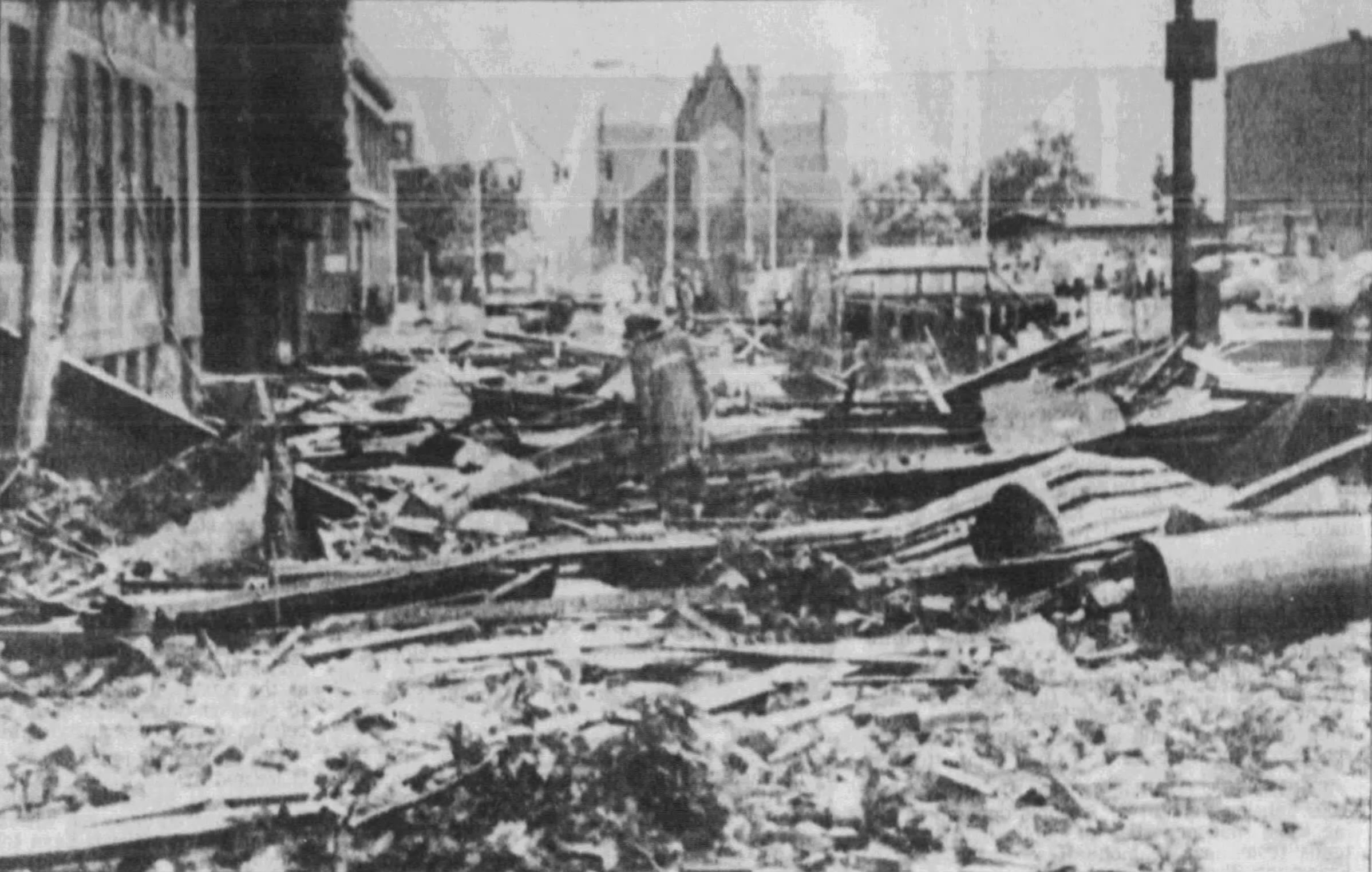
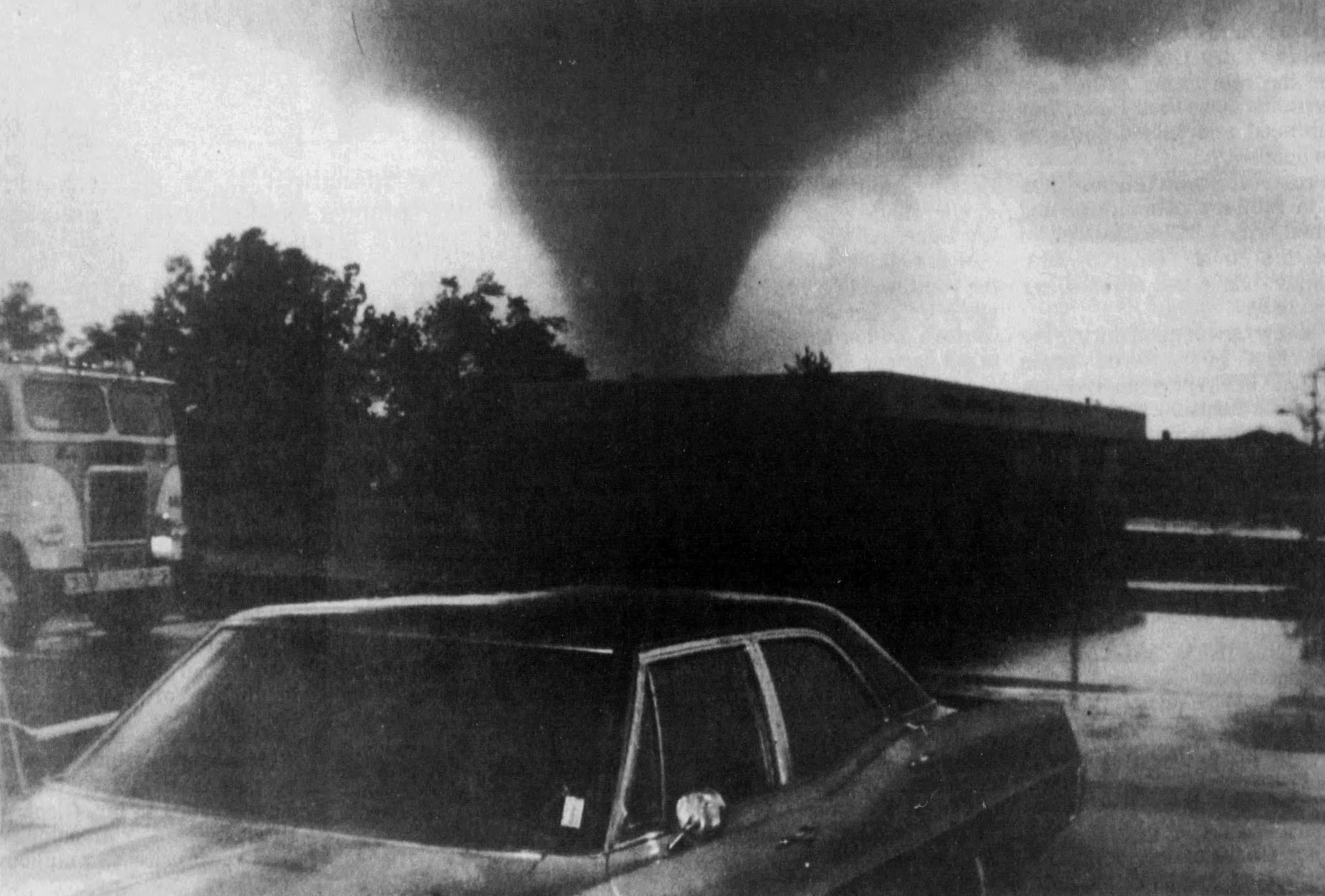
- Clockwise from top: A large F4 tornado near Ponca, Nebraska as seen from Sioux City, Iowa on July 28; The ruins of a farm near Mingo, Iowa after an F4 tornado on September 28; Rubble in a street in Providence, Rhode Island after an F2 tornado on August 7; A large F2 tornado approaching Sikeston, Missouri on May 15; Homes in southern Lexington, Kentucky after an F3 tornado on March 10; The wiped foundation of a home near Nadeau, Michigan after a rare F3 tornado in the Upper Peninsula on July 4.
- Timespan: February–December 1986
- Maximum rated tornado: F4 tornado: Meridian, Mississippi on March 12; Shanghai, China on July 11; Sloan, Iowa on July 28; Farrar, Iowa on September 28
- Tornadoes in U.S.: 765
- Damage (U.S.): $1 billion (1986 USD)
- Fatalities (U.S.): 15
- Fatalities (worldwide): >15

This page documents the tornadoes and tornado outbreaks of 1986, primarily in the United States. Most tornadoes form in the U.S., although some events may take place internationally. Tornado statistics for older years like this often appear significantly lower than modern years due to fewer reports or confirmed tornadoes.

== Synopsis ==
Fatal United States tornadoes in 1986
- Approximate touchdown location of killer tornadoes in 1986 Summary of tornadoes: February 5 – Texas (2 deaths); March 10 – Indiana (1 death); March 10 – Ohio (1 death); March 10 – Ohio (1 death); March 10 – Ohio (1 death); March 12 – Alabama (2 deaths); April 19 – Texas (1 death); April 26 – Iowa, Minnesota (1 death); May 15 – Missouri (1 death); July 2 – North Carolina (3 deaths); August 15 – New York (1 death); Total fatalities: 15

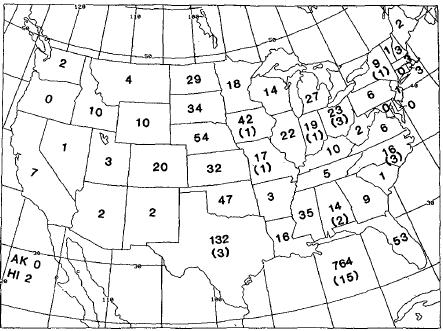
Map of 1986 tornadoes by state

The 1986 tornado season was one of the least deadly on record in the United States with just 15 fatalities; only 1910 and 2018 had fewer deaths from U.S. tornadoes. There were no F5 tornadoes in 1986 and just three rated F4, none of which resulted in any fatalities. Overall tornado numbers were below normal, although they were higher than 1987. The total number of tornadoes was 765. Idaho saw 10 tornadoes between May and September, a high number for the state that would not be surpassed until 1993.

== Events ==
Confirmed tornado total for the entire year 1986 in the United States.

Confirmed tornadoes by Fujita rating
FU	F0	F1	F2	F3	F4	F5	Total
0	354	271	116	21	3	0	765

== January ==
There were no tornadoes confirmed in the US in January. This was the first month with no tornadoes since November 1976.

== February ==
There were 30 tornadoes confirmed in the US in February.

=== February 5–6 ===
FU	F0	F1	F2	F3	F4	F5
0	3	6	3	2	0	0

An outbreak of tornadoes occurred, extending from Texas to Tennessee. The most notable tornadoes of this outbreak all came from one supercell in the Houston area, which produced 4 tornadoes, the strongest being an F3 which caused 2 deaths and devastated a mobile home park and David Wayne Hooks Airport southeast of Tomball. On the 6th a F3 tornado travelled 10.5 miles through Bradley County, Polk County, and McMinn County, Tennessee, the tornado hit the Chatata Valley area particularly hard. The tornado then travelled through mainly rural areas of Polk and McMinn Counties, before dissipating 10 miles south of Athens.

== March ==
There were 76 tornadoes confirmed in the US in March.

=== March 10–12 ===
A large tornado outbreak produced 41 tornadoes on March 10–12, killing six people in Alabama, Indiana and Ohio. One tornado rated F4 in Meridian, Mississippi resulted in no fatalities.

== April ==
There were 84 tornadoes confirmed in the US in April.

=== April 19 ===
An early-morning F3 tornado struck Sweetwater, Texas, resulting in one death and 100 injuries. It was part of an outbreak that produced 14 tornadoes.

== May ==
There were 173 tornadoes confirmed in the US in May.

=== May 8 ===
Two tornadoes struck Edmond. The first was a strong F3 which caused significant damage in Edmond, Oklahoma and injured 15 people. The second and much weaker tornado touched down as the main tornado dissipated, causing F1 damage on a discontinuous path. Overall, no fatalities were reported.

== June ==
There were 134 tornadoes confirmed in the US in June.

== July ==
There were 88 tornadoes confirmed in the US in July.

=== July 2 ===
An F2 tornado killed three in Onslow County, North Carolina. This would be the most people killed by a single tornado in 1986.

=== July 18 ===
Fridley, Minnesota was struck by a multi-vortex F2 tornado which captured by KARE 11. It caused significant tree and structural damages.

=== July 28 ===
An F4 tornado struck Nebraska and Iowa near Sioux City, Iowa. There were no fatalities.

== August ==
There were 67 tornadoes confirmed in the US in August.

=== August 7 ===
An F2 tornado struck Cranston, Rhode Island becoming the first, and only, significant tornado in Rhode Island history until an EF2 tornado struck moved through parts of Providence County on August 18, 2023.

== September ==
There were 65 tornadoes confirmed in the US in September.

=== September 24 ===
An F2 tornado hit Vina, California and injured one person.

=== September 28 ===
An F4 tornado struck Farrar, Iowa resulting in no fatalities.

== October ==
There were 26 tornadoes confirmed in the US in October.

== November ==
There were 17 tornadoes confirmed in the US in November.

== December ==
There were 5 tornadoes confirmed in the US in December.

== See also ==
- Tornado
  - Tornadoes by year
  - Tornado records
  - Tornado climatology
  - Tornado myths
- List of tornado outbreaks
  - List of F5 and EF5 tornadoes
  - List of North American tornadoes and tornado outbreaks
  - List of 21st-century Canadian tornadoes and tornado outbreaks
  - List of European tornadoes and tornado outbreaks
  - List of tornadoes and tornado outbreaks in Asia
  - List of Southern Hemisphere tornadoes and tornado outbreaks
  - List of tornadoes striking downtown areas
- Tornado intensity
  - Fujita scale
  - Enhanced Fujita scale
