= Crocker, Iowa =

- Unincorporated community
- Location within Iowa
- Coordinates: 41°46′29″N 93°40′12″W
- Country: United States
- State: Iowa
- County: Polk
- Elevation: 981 ft (299 m)
- Time zone: UTC-6 (Central (CST))
  - Summer (DST): UTC-5 (CDT)
- Area code: 515
- GNIS feature ID: 455721

Crocker is an unincorporated community in Polk County, Iowa, United States.

== History ==
Crocker was platted in 1880. The community took its name from Crocker Township, Iowa.

A post office was established at Crocker in 1882, and remained in operation until it was discontinued in 1918. Crocker's population was 48 in 1902, and 50 in 1925. The population was 20 in 1940.
