= List of dam removals in Iowa =

This is a list of dams in Iowa that have been removed as physical impediments to free-flowing rivers or streams.

== Completed removals ==
| Dam | Height | Year removed | Location | Watercourse | Watershed |
|---|---|---|---|---|---|
| Klondike Dam | 12 ft (3.7 m) | 2013 | Lyon County; 43.3862°N 96.5216°W | Big Sioux River | Big Sioux River |
| Quaker Mill Dam | 22 ft (6.7 m) | 2017 | Delaware County; 42.51°N 91.47°W | Maquoketa River | Maquoketa River |
| Hopkinton Dam | | 2004 | Hopkinton; 42.3376°N 91.2576°W | Maquoketa River | Maquoketa River |
| Manchester Dam | 11 ft (3.4 m) | 2014 | Manchester; 42.4821°N 91.4585°W | Maquoketa River | Maquoketa River |
| Boone Waterworks Dam | 3 ft (0.91 m) | 2014 | Boone County; 42.077°N 93.9366°W | Des Moines River | Des Moines River |
| Corn Belt Power Dam | 5 ft (1.5 m) | | Humboldt; 42.6741°N 94.1901°W | Des Moines River | Des Moines River |
| Fort Dodge Hydroelectric Dam | 17 ft (5.2 m) | 2020 | Webster; 42.5163°N 94.2003°W | Des Moines River | Des Moines River |
| Little Dam | 8 ft (2.4 m) | 2019 | Fort Dodge; 42.4937°N 94.1873°W | Des Moines River | Des Moines River |
| Ice Plant Dam (Zubes Dam) | 1 ft (0.30 m) | | Hamilton; 42.4737°N 93.8108°W | Boone River | Des Moines River |
| Goldfield Dam | 4.5 ft (1.4 m) | 2014 | Wright County; 42.7367°N 93.927°W | Boone River | Des Moines River |
| Plum Creek Dam | 2 ft (0.61 m) | | Kossuth County; 43.1109°N 94.2072°W | East Fork Des Moines River | Des Moines River |
| Rockford Dam | 8 ft (2.4 m) | 2014 | Rockford; 43.0503°N 92.9424°W | Shell Rock River | Cedar River |
| Fourth Street Dam | 2 ft (0.61 m) | | Cerro Gordo County; 43.1552°N 93.1846°W | Willow Creek | Cedar River |
| East Lake Park Dam 1 | 5 ft (1.5 m) | 2016 | Mason City; 43.1535°N 93.1862°W | Willow Creek | Cedar River |
| East Lake Park Dam 3 | 5 ft (1.5 m) | 2017 | Mason City; 43.1551°N 93.1846°W | Willow Creek | Cedar River |
| Vernon Springs Dam | 8 ft (2.4 m) | 2010 | Howard County; 43.3474°N 92.1378°W | Turkey River | Turkey River |
| North Washington Mill Dam | 8 ft (2.4 m) | | Chickasaw County; 43.1179°N 92.4106°W | Little Wapsipinicon River | Wapsipinicon River |
| Quasqueton Dam | 6 ft (1.8 m) | 2014 | Buchanan County; 42.3928°N 91.7622°W | Wapsipinicon River | Wapsipinicon River |
