= Saydel Community School District =

Public school district in Polk County, Iowa, United States

Location
- 5740 NE 14th Street, Des Moines, Iowa 50313 United States
- Coordinates: 41°39′56″N 93°36′05″W

District information
- Type: Public
- Grades: PreK-12
- Superintendent: Todd Martin
- Schools: 3
- Budget: $25,620,000 (2020-21)
- NCES District ID: 1925320

Students and staff
- Students: 1337 (2022-23)
- Teachers: 108.23 FTE
- Staff: 101.85 FTE
- Student–teacher ratio: 12.35
- Athletic conference: Heart of Iowa
- District mascot: Eagles
- Colors: Forest Green and Gold

Other information
- Website: www.saydel.k12.ia.us

The Saydel Community School District is a rural public school district with its headquarters in unincorporated Polk County, Iowa.

The district, entirely in Polk County, serves portions of Des Moines and Ankeny. It also serves a portion of the Saylorville census-designated place.

Within the district are three schools: one elementary school, a middle school, and one high school. District offices are located next to Woodside Middle School.

The district was organized in 1952, under the procedure provided by Chapter 276, Code of Iowa 1950, I.C.A. It was a consolidation of all the five school districts in Saylor Civil Township, and also of Berwick Independent District and Delaware Township sub-district No. 3, both of which were in Delaware Civil Township, collectively resulting in the name “Saydel.”

In 2024, the district began implementing a four day school week.

== Schools ==
- Cornell Elementary
- Woodside Middle School
- Saydel High School

It previously operated Norwoodville Elementary School.

=== Saydel High School ===
==== Athletics ====
The Eagles compete in the Heart of Iowa Conference in the following sports:

- Cross Country
  - Boys' 1957 Class B State Champions
- Volleyball
- Football
- Basketball
- Wrestling

2024 and 2025 Colbie Tenborg

- Track and Field
- Soccer
- Golf
- Tennis
- Baseball
- Softball

== See also ==
- List of school districts in Iowa
- List of high schools in Iowa
