= Saylorville, Iowa =

- CDP
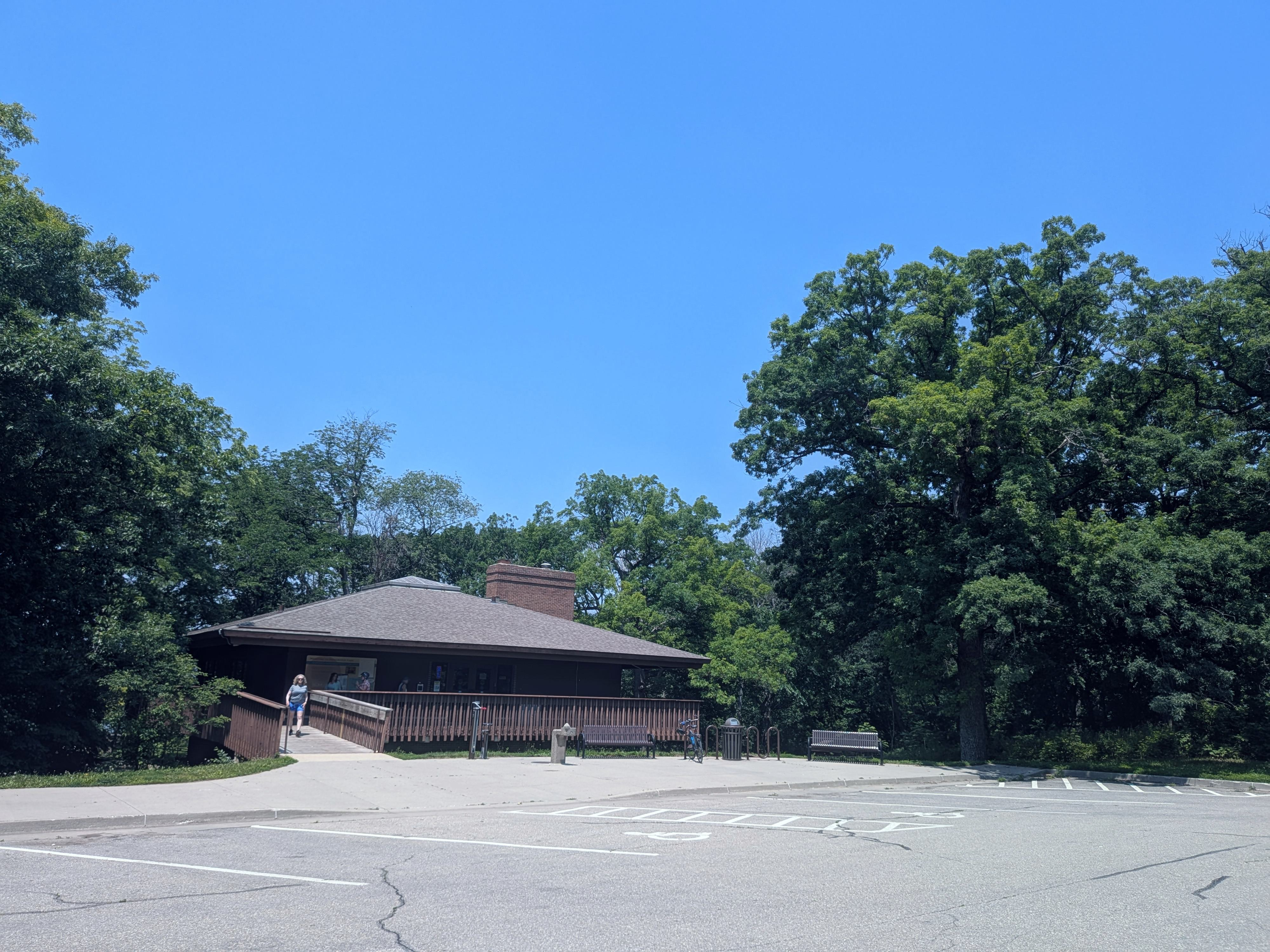
- Saylorville Lake Visitor Center

- Location of Saylorville, Iowa
- Coordinates: 41°40′52″N 93°37′21″W
- Country: United States
- State: Iowa
- County: Polk
- Townships: Saylor, Crocker
- Founded: 1850

Area
  - Total: 6.96 sq mi (18.02 km^{2})
  - Land: 6.84 sq mi (17.72 km^{2})
  - Water: 0.12 sq mi (0.30 km^{2})
- Elevation: 883 ft (269 m)

Population (2020)
  - Total: 3,584
  - Density: 523.7/sq mi (202.22/km^{2})
- Time zone: UTC−6 (Central (CST))
  - Summer (DST): UTC−5 (CDT)
- ZIP code: 50313
- Area code: 515
- FIPS code: 19-70995
- GNIS feature ID: 2393225

Saylorville is a census-designated place (CDP) in Saylor and Crocker townships, Polk County, Iowa, United States. The population was 3,584 at the 2020 census. It is part of the Des Moines–West Des Moines Metropolitan Statistical Area. The Saydel Community School District is located in this area, as is the unincorporated community of Marquisville.

== Geography ==
According to the United States Census Bureau, the city has a total area of 7.04 square miles (18.2 km^{2}), all land.

== History ==
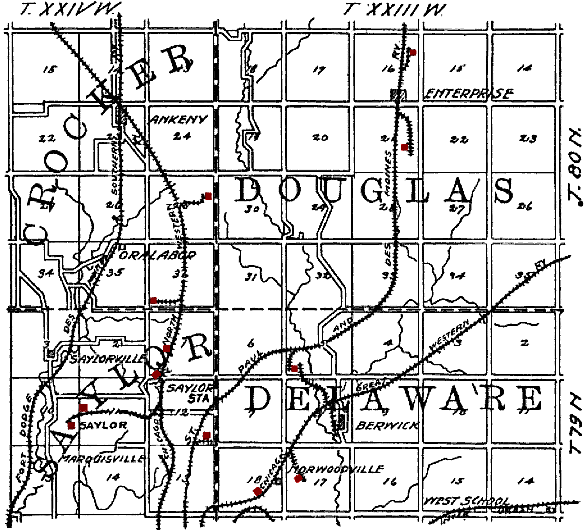
Map of the Saylorville area from 1908, showing the railroads and coal mines (red) of the region. Saylorville is in the lower left quadrant.

Saylorville was laid out in 1850. It is named for its founder, John B. Saylor.

Coal mining played an important part in the early history of Saylorville, as outlined in the map below.

== Demographics ==
Historical population
Census	Pop.	Note	%±
1990	2,709		—
2000	3,238		19.5%
2010	3,301		1.9%
2020	3,584		8.6%
U.S. Decennial Census; 2020 Census

=== 2020 census ===
As of the 2020 census, Saylorville had a population of 3,584, with 1,394 households and 1,083 families. The population density was 523.7 inhabitants per square mile (202.2/km^{2}). There were 1,427 housing units at an average density of 208.5 per square mile (80.5/km^{2}).

The median age was 45.5 years. 23.9% of residents were under the age of 18 and 19.2% were 65 years of age or older. For every 100 females there were 101.2 males, and for every 100 females age 18 and over there were 100.8 males age 18 and over.

93.4% of residents lived in urban areas, while 6.6% lived in rural areas.

Of the 1,394 households, 31.3% had children under the age of 18 living in them. Of all households, 67.6% were married-couple households, 5.2% were cohabiting-couple households, 10.4% were households with a male householder and no spouse or partner present, and 16.8% were households with a female householder and no spouse or partner present. About 22.3% were non-family households, 18.3% were made up of individuals, and 11.2% had someone living alone who was 65 years of age or older.

There were 1,427 housing units, of which 2.3% were vacant. The homeowner vacancy rate was 0.8% and the rental vacancy rate was 4.8%.

Racial composition as of the 2020 census
Race	Number	Percent
White	3,358	93.7%
Black or African American	39	1.1%
American Indian and Alaska Native	5	0.1%
Asian	35	1.0%
Native Hawaiian and Other Pacific Islander	2	0.1%
Some other race	25	0.7%
Two or more races	120	3.3%
Hispanic or Latino (of any race)	79	2.2%

=== 2010 census ===
As of the census of 2010, there were 3,301 people, 1,287 households, and 1,004 families residing in the CDP. The population density was 469.1 inhabitants per square mile (181.1/km^{2}). There were 1,331 housing units at an average density of 189.1 per square mile (73/km^{2}). The racial makeup of the town was 97.3% White, 0.9% African American, 0.2% Native American, 0.9% Asian, 0.2% from other races, and 0.5% from two or more races. Hispanic or Latino of any race were 1.4% of the population.

There were 1,287 households, out of which 28.8% had children under the age of 18 living with them, 69.5% were married couples living together, 5.6% had a female householder with no husband present, 3.0% had a male householder with no wife present, and 22.0% were non-families. 17.3% of all households were made up of individuals, and 7.9% had someone living alone who was 65 years of age or older. The average household size was 2.56 and the average family size was 2.89.

In the city the population was spread out, with 22.8% under the age of 18, 5.6% from 18 to 24, 21.6% from 25 to 44, 35.1% from 45 to 64, and 14.8% who were 65 years of age or older. The median age was 45 years. The gender makeup of the city was 50.2% male and 49.8% female.

=== Income and poverty ===
The median income for a household in the CDP was $67,197, and the median income for a family was $72,882. Males had a median income of $41,486 versus $35,833 for females. The per capita income for the CDP was $28,034. None of the families and 2.1% of the population were living below the poverty line, including no under eighteens and 5.1% of those over 64.

== Education ==
School districts serving sections of the CDP include: Saydel Community School District, and Ankeny Community School District.

In Ankeny CSD, Crocker, Prairie Trail, and Southeast elementaries serve sections of Saylorville, as well as Parkview Middle School and Southview Middle School. Ankeny CSD residents are zoned to Ankeny High School.
