= Saylorville Lake =

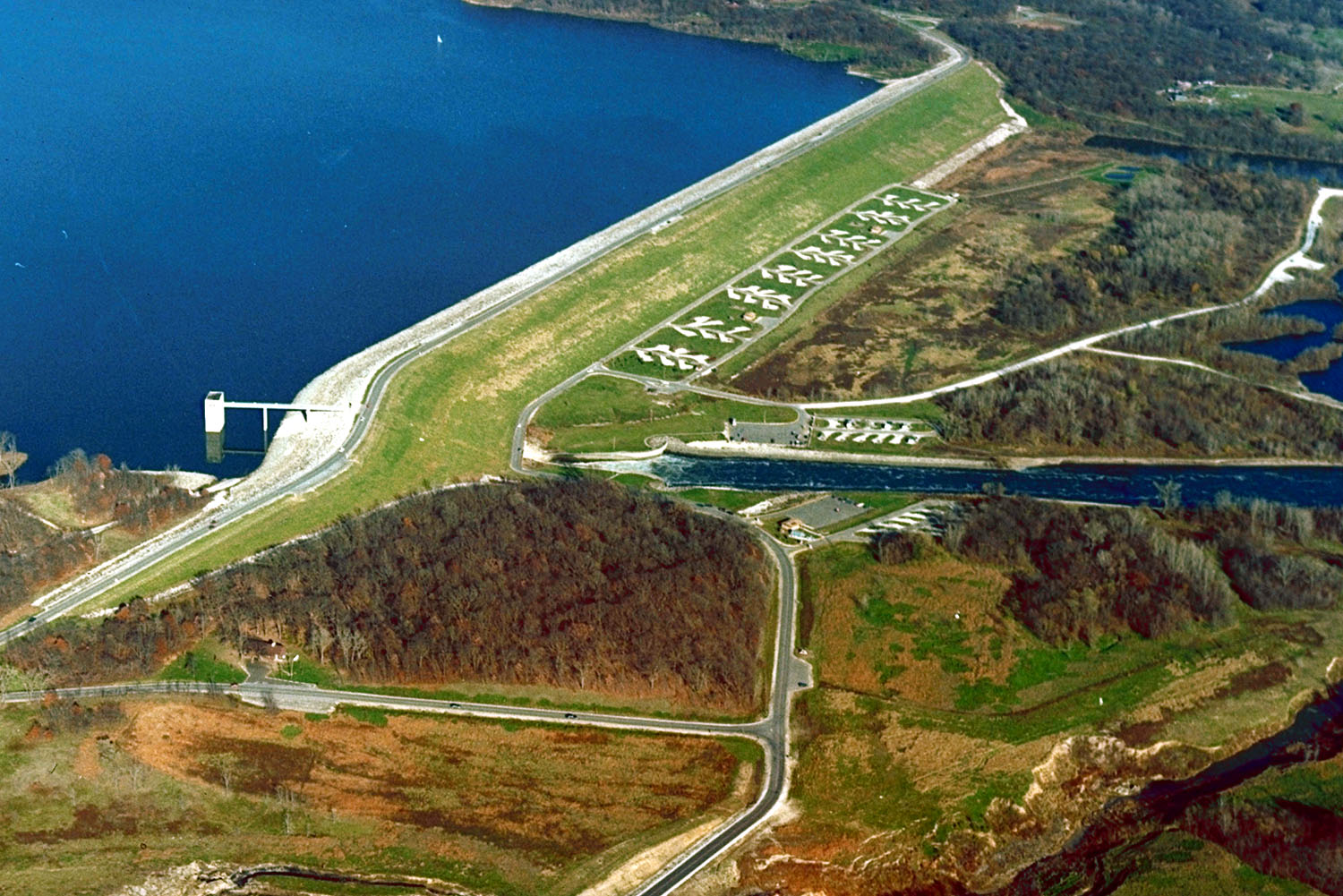
- Saylorville Dam and Lake on the Des Moines River. View is to the northeast.

- Location within Iowa Location within the United States
- Location: Polk / Dallas / Boone counties, Iowa, United States
- Coordinates: 41°43′37″N 93°41′59″W
- Type: Reservoir
- Primary inflows: Des Moines River
- Primary outflows: Des Moines River
- Catchment area: 5,823 square miles (15,080 km^{2})
- Basin countries: United States
- Max. length: 24 miles (39 km) (normal) max.: 54 miles (87 km) (full flood control pool)
- Max. width: 6,750 feet (2,060 m) (at dam)
- Surface area: 5,950 acres (24 km^{2}) (normal) max.: 16,700 acres (68 km^{2}) (flood control pool)
- Water volume: 73,600 acre⋅ft (0.0908 km^{3}) max.: 641,000 acre⋅ft (0.791 km^{3})
- Surface elevation: 836 ft (255 m) msl max.: 890 ft (271 m) msl

Saylorville Lake is a reservoir on the Des Moines River in Iowa, United States. It is located about 11 miles (18 km) upstream from the city of Des Moines, and 214 miles (344 km) from the mouth of the Des Moines River at the Mississippi River. It was constructed as part of a flood control system for the Des Moines River as well as to aid in controlling flood crests on the Mississippi, of which the Des Moines is a tributary. The lake and dam is owned and operated by the U.S. Army Corps of Engineers, Rock Island District.

At its conservation pool normal level of 836 feet (255 m) above sea level, Saylorville Lake covers an area of 5,950 acres (24 km^{2}) or 9.3 square miles (24.1 km^{2}) and reaches some 17 miles (27 km) upstream. At full flood stage the lake can reach 16,700 acres (68 km^{2}) or 26.1 square miles (67.6 km^{2}) and reach 54 miles (87 km) long. At this Full Flood Pool, any further flow into the lake is channelled over an emergency spillway to the west of the main dam structure. The record high stage for the reservoir was 892.03 feet (271.89 m) above sea level set on July 11, 1993, during the Great Flood of 1993.

The lake is used for many recreational activities in the central Iowa area as well, as there is a large state park infrastructure surrounding the area of the lake, notably Jester Park and Big Creek State Park. The Corps of Engineers operates several recreation areas, campgrounds, and boat ramp facilities around the lake. Boating and swimming are very popular, as are camping, deer and game bird hunting, fishing, hiking, biking and disc golf. Coast Guard Auxiliary Flotilla 4 provides boating safety education and free vessel safety checks to boaters in the area. Overall visitation was estimated at 1.5 million for FY 2016.

Fish species that can be found in the lake include crappie, bluegill, green sunfish, largemouth bass, smallmouth bass, brown trout, northern pike, common carp, white bass, walleye, yellow bass, american eel, flathead catfish, channel catfish, bullhead catfish, and hybrid striped bass.

== Saylorville Dam ==
Saylorville Dam is an embankment dam which was authorized for construction by Congress in 1958 by the Flood Control Act of 1958. The project was undertaken in response to the Des Moines River's history of flooding, including major floods in 1851, 1903, 1935, 1938, and 1944. Excavation began at the site in July 1965, becoming fully operational in September 1977, costing "$130 million as part of the Saylorville Lake Project." The dam itself is 6,750 feet (2,057 m) long, 105 feet (32 m) tall, and 44 feet (13 m) wide at the top. The US Army Corps of Engineers estimates that $385 million of flood damages have been prevented by the project. The Dam was constructed as part of the larger Saylorville Lake Project, which also includes the Big Creek Remedial Works, the parts and uses of which are as follows:

- Barrier dam;
- Pump station: three 24" pumps with 350 horsepower motors, which pump excess water when water levels in the lake are too high;
- Diversion dam: constructed to form Big Creek Lake and specifically enables protection from flooding within Big Creek Watershed;
- Diversion channel and terminal dam/spillway: "Diverts floodwater from Big Creek Lake into Saylorville Lake." The spillway has a crest elevation of 920 NGVD. Following the Great Flood of 1993, the USACE added pneumatic crest gates to the spillway in 1994.

However, the designs of the USACE are at risk of being compromised by inflows of sediment to the reservoir. The process of sedimentation has led to c. 50 million cubic feet of sediment flowing into the lake each year; the process also affects the viability of local industry and recreation. The typical solution to the problem is to raise the water level of the reservoir, but this leads to a lower capacity for storing flood water. In 2024, rainfall led to the reservoir filling to "44 feet more than normal lake levels and a few feet below the spillway."

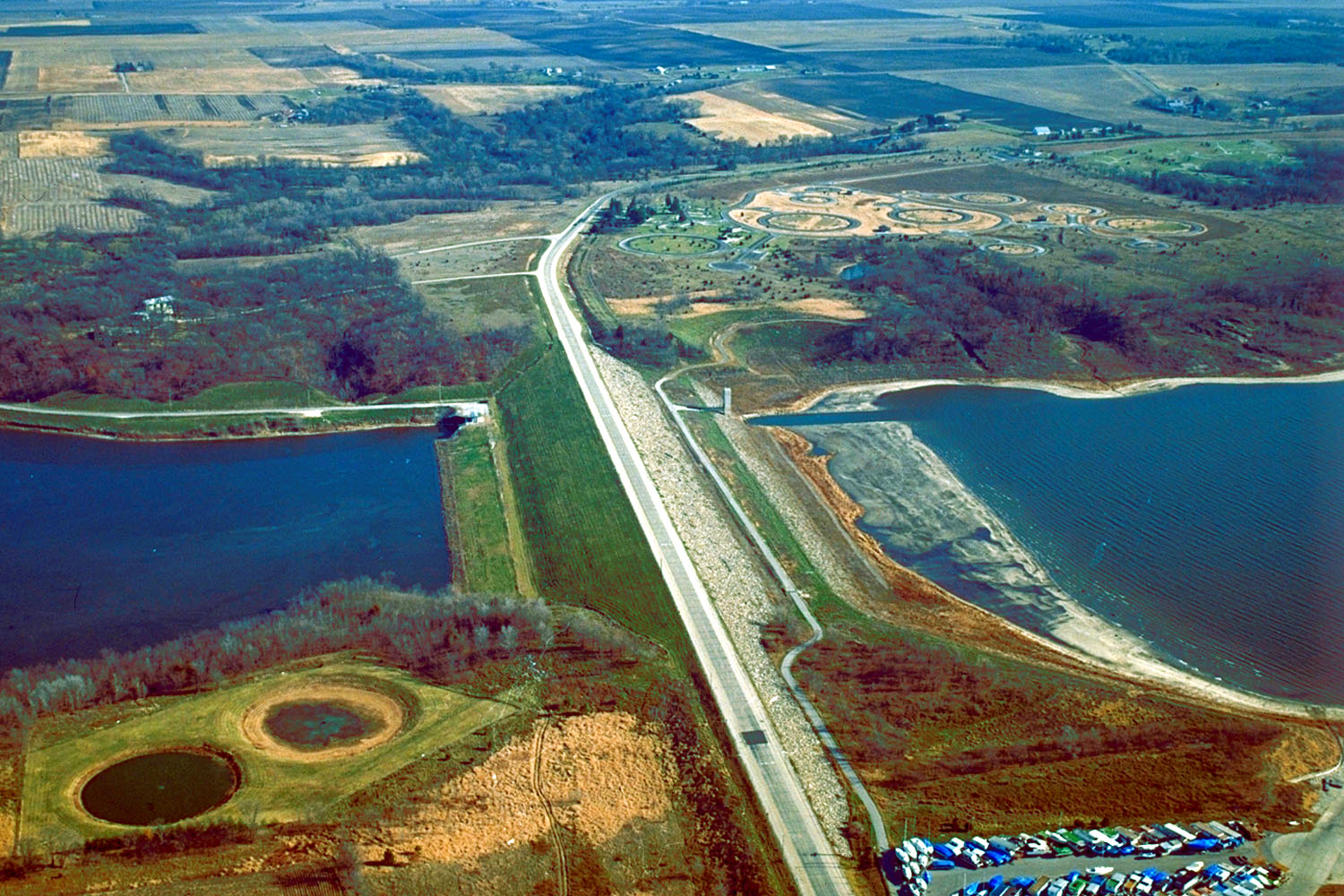
Barrier Dam, the second dam impounding Saylorville Lake. View is to the southeast.

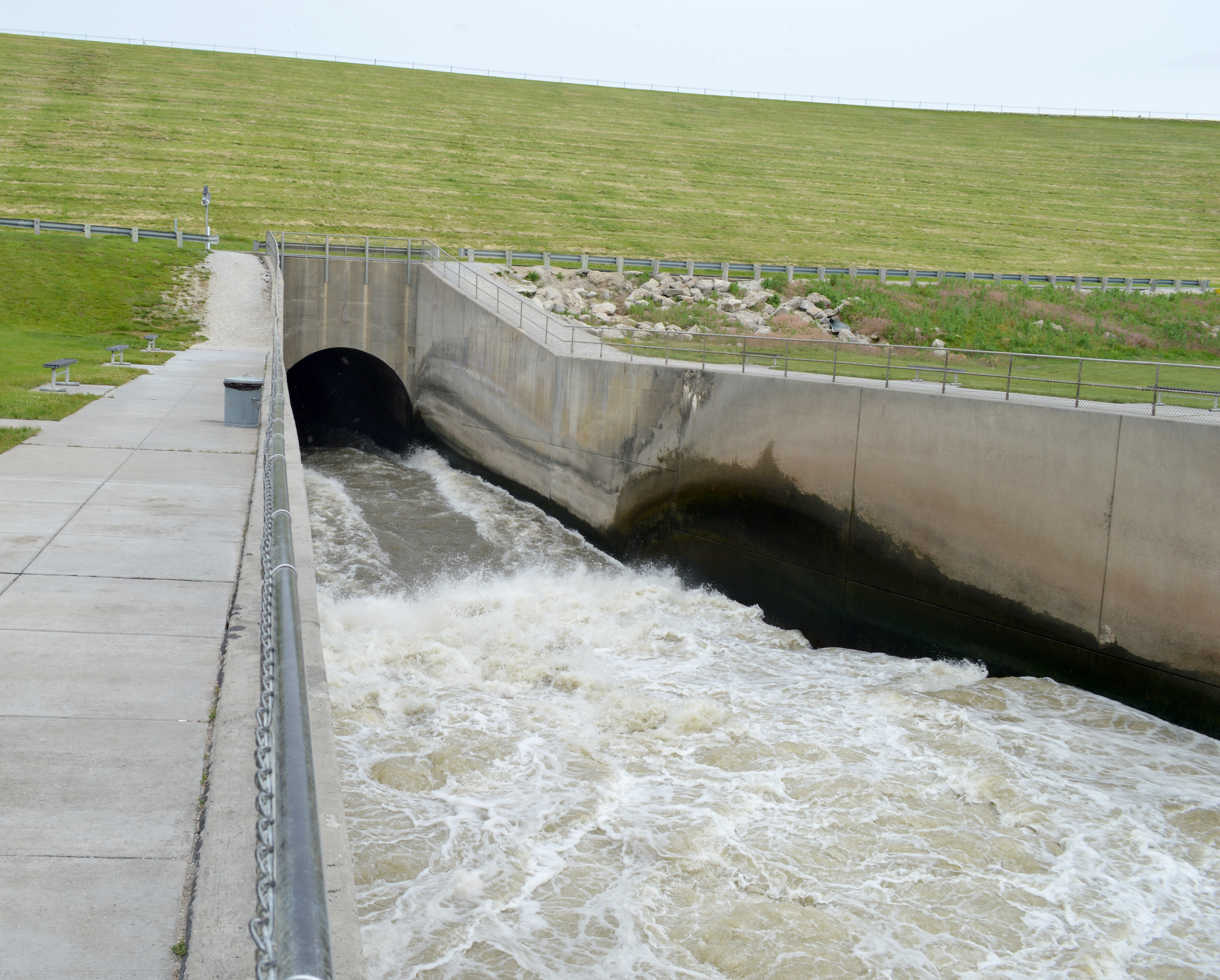
Spillway

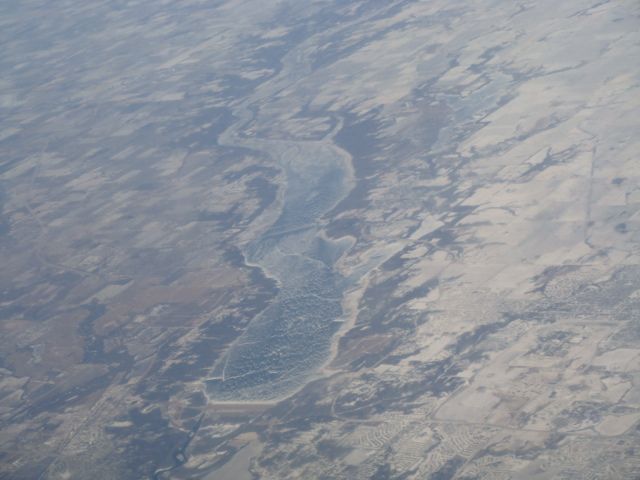
Saylorville Lake in the winter as seen from an airplane

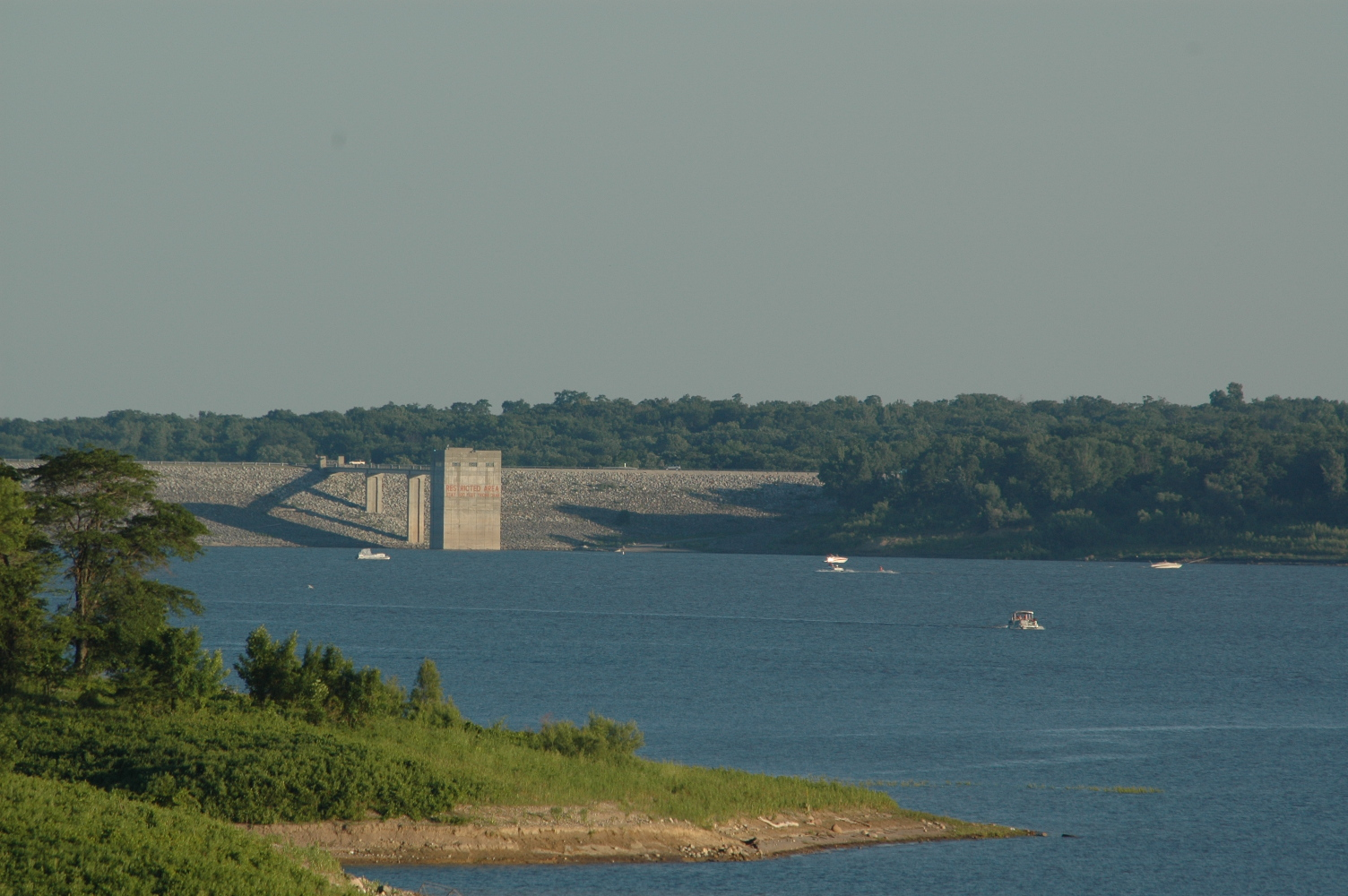
A view of Saylorville Lake.

== See also ==
- Des Moines River
- Lake Red Rock (Des Moines River)
- U.S. Army Corps of Engineers
- List of dams and reservoirs in Iowa
