= Farrar, Iowa =

- Unincorporated community
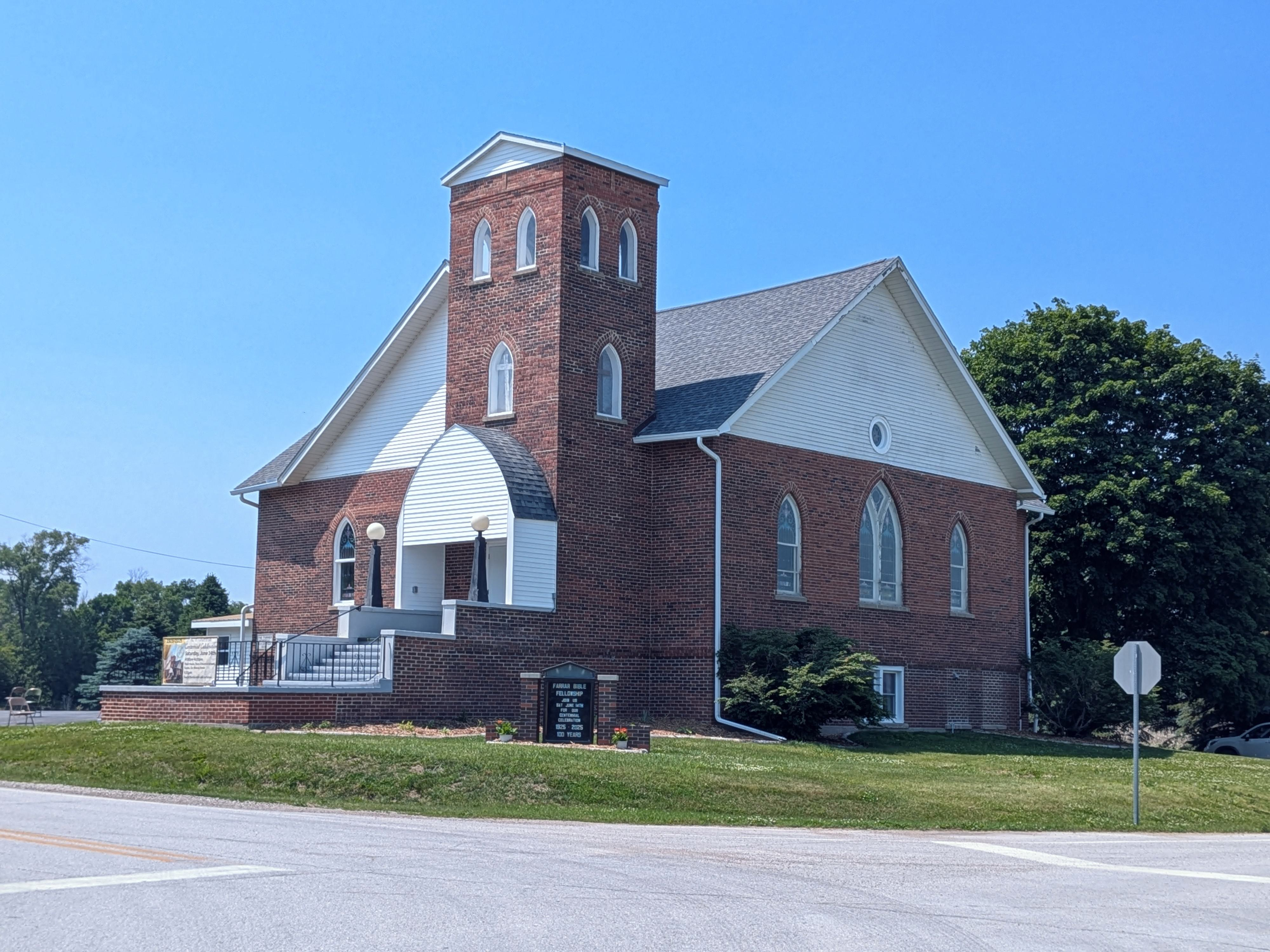
- Farrar Bible Fellowship, a church in Farrar

- Location within Iowa
- Coordinates: 41°48′21″N 93°22′12″W
- Country: United States
- State: Iowa
- County: Polk
- Township: Washington
- Elevation: 974 ft (297 m)
- Time zone: UTC-6 (Central (CST))
  - Summer (DST): UTC-5 (CDT)
- Area code: 515
- GNIS feature ID: 456558

Farrar is an unincorporated community in Washington Township, Polk County, Iowa, United States. A formerly abandoned elementary school building, now owned by paranormal investigative YouTubers Sam and Colby, and one church are located in Farrar, as well as 13 houses. As a result of unincorporation all residents of Farrar now have a Maxwell, Iowa address.

== History ==
Farrar owes its development to the railroad line that was developed through the area in 1902-1903 , and was consequently named in honor of one of the railroad employees involved in the creation of that line. A post office was established in 1904.

Farrar's population was 42 in 1925. The population was 36 in 1940.

== Education ==
Bondurant–Farrar Community School District operates local area public schools.
