= Coralville Lake =

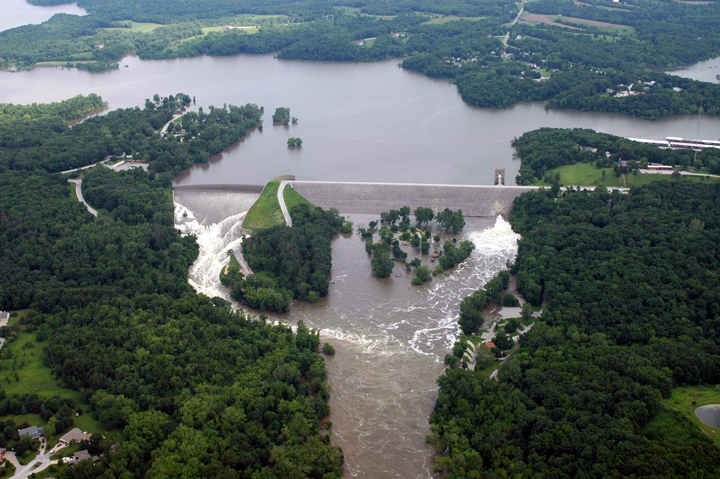
- Coralville Dam on June 15, 2008, with the main control gates fully opened, and water flowing over the concrete emergency spillway (left) at about 5 ft (1.5 m) deep

- Location within Iowa
- Location: Johnson County, Iowa, U.S.
- Coordinates: 41°43′28″N 91°31′47″W
- Type: reservoir
- Primary inflows: Iowa River
- Primary outflows: Iowa River
- Catchment area: Upper Mississippi River
- Basin countries: United States
- Water volume: 461,200 acre⋅ft (568,900,000 m^{3})

Coralville Lake is an artificial lake in Johnson County, Iowa, United States, formed by the Coralville Dam, a dam built from 1949 to 1958 on the Iowa River upstream from the city of Coralville, Iowa.

== History ==
Coralville Dam
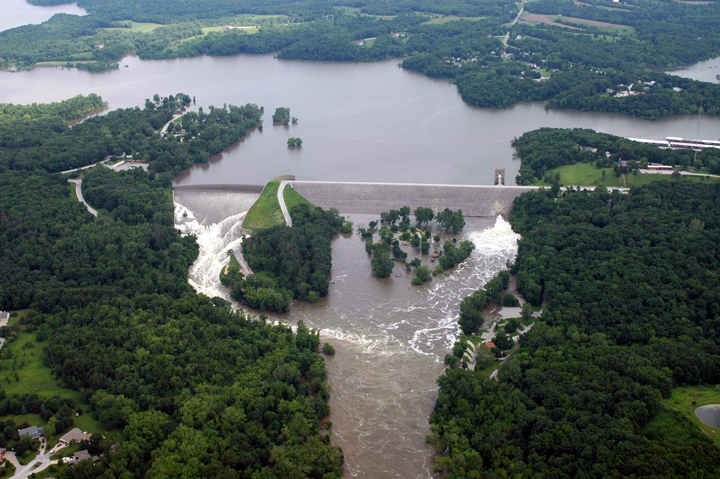
- Interactive map of Coralville Dam
- Country: United States
- Location: Johnson County, Iowa
- Status: Operational
- Construction began: 1949; 77 years ago
- Opening date: 1958; 68 years ago
- Construction cost: $15,744,000
- Owner: U.S. Army Corps of Engineers

Dam and spillways
- Type of dam: Earth Filled Embankment
- Impounds: Iowa River
- Height: 100 ft (30 m)
- Length: 1,400 ft (427 m)
- Width (crest): 22 ft (7 m)
- Width (base): 850 ft (259 m)

Reservoir
- Creates: Coralville Lake
- Total capacity: 28,100 acre⋅ft (34,660,840 m^{3}) (Normal pool); 421,000 acre⋅ft (519,295,854 m^{3}) (Flood storage pool)
- Catchment area: 3,084 sq mi (7,988 km^{2})
- Surface area: 5,280 acres (2,140 ha) (Normal pool); 24,800 acres (10,000 ha) (Flood storage pool)
- Maximum length: 23 mi (37 km) (Normal pool); 41.5 mi (67 km) (Flood storage pool)
- Normal elevation: 679–717 ft (207–219 m) above msl
- Website https://www.mvr.usace.army.mil/Missions/Recreation/Coralville-Lake/

After widespread flooding in the United States during the early 1930s, Congress passed the Flood Control Act of 1938. The United States Army Corps of Engineers built the 100-foot-high earthen dam primarily as a flood control project for the Mississippi River. Construction started in 1949, was delayed by the Korean War, and was completed in 1958.

The lake has a capacity of 461,200 acre⋅ft (568,900,000 m^{3}) of water, equal to 137.18 billion gallons at its "100 year flood" level of 712-foot (217 m).

=== Floods ===
Water first flowed over the 712-foot (217 m) emergency spillway on July 5, 1993 (see Great Flood of 1993), reaching a then-record crest. This flood uncovered what is now the Devonian Fossil Gorge.

The 1993 record was surpassed by the June 2008 Midwest floods, when water again flowed over the 712-foot (217 m) emergency spillway on June 12, 2008, and the reservoir crested at 717 feet (219 m) early in the morning on June 15, 2008.

Lake Macbride is formed by another dam just up from the Coralville reservoir. This dam was overtopped by floodwaters in the flood of 2008, and the lake effectively became part of Coralville Lake.

== Recreation and public use ==
The lake and surrounding shoreline have been extensively developed for public recreational use, including hiking, biking, camping, fishing and boating. There are 11 recreation areas, 4 swimming beaches, 3 marinas, 18 boat ramps, 3 campgrounds (total of 620 campsites), 7 large picnic shelters, 2 disc golf courses, and 7 trails (total of 29 miles).

== Photos ==
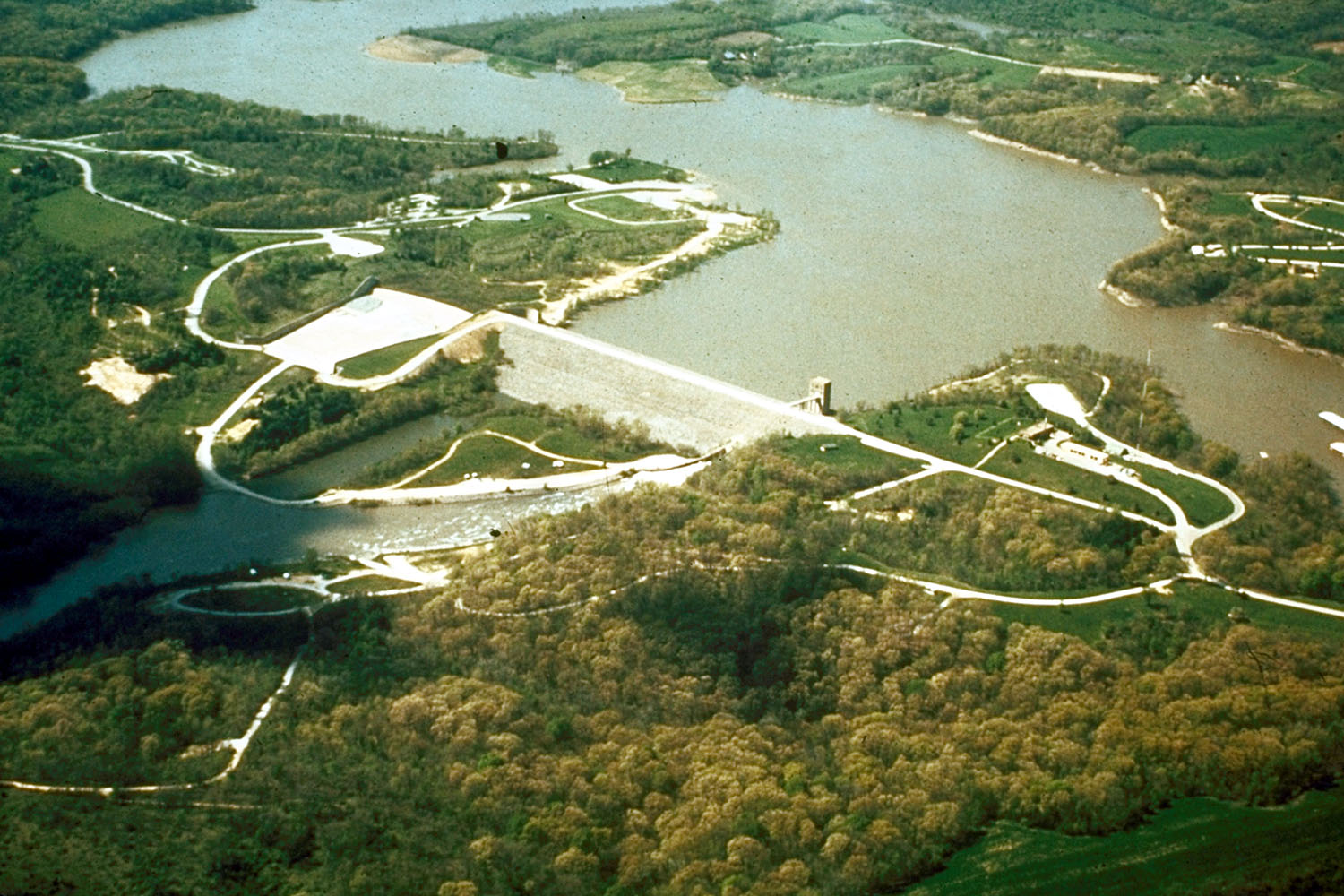
Coralville Dam and Reservoir near Coralville, Iowa.

A tackle shop near Coralville Dam.

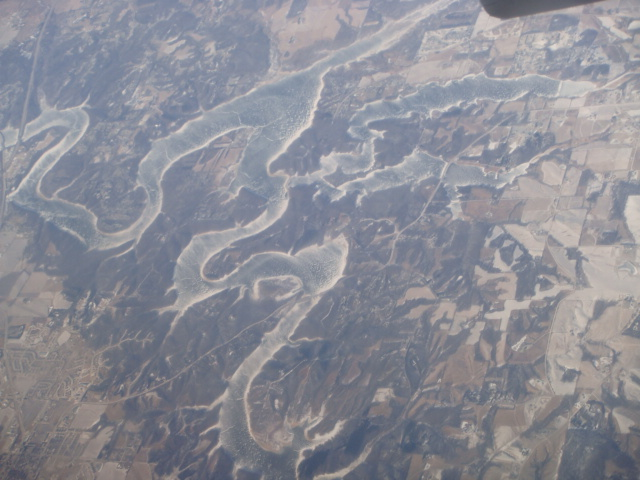
Coralville Lake as seen from the airplane during winter

== See also ==
- List of dams and reservoirs in Iowa
- Lake Macbride State Park
