= List of dams and reservoirs in Iowa =

Following is a list of dams and reservoirs in Iowa.

All major dams are linked below. The National Inventory of Dams defines any "major dam" as being 50 feet (15 m) tall with a storage capacity of at least 5,000 acre-feet (6,200,000 m^{3}), or of any height with a storage capacity of 25,000 acre-feet (31,000,000 m^{3}).

== Dams and reservoirs in Iowa ==
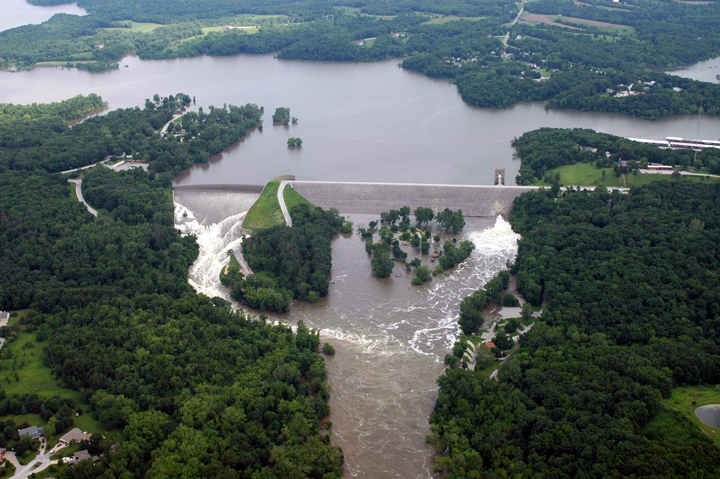
Coralville Lake

This list is incomplete. You can help Wikipedia by expanding it.

- Coralville Dam, Coralville Lake, United States Army Corps of Engineers
- Dale Maffitt Dam, Dale Maffitt Reservoir, Des Moines Water Works
- Delhi Dam, Lake Delhi, locally owned (breached 2010)
- Lake Icaria Dam, Lake Icaria, Adams County Soil and Water Conservation District
- Lock and Dam No. 9, Big Lake and Lake Winneshiek, USACE
- Lock and Dam No. 10, Mississippi River, USACE
- Lock and Dam No. 11, Mississippi River, USACE
- Lock and Dam No. 12, Mississippi River, USACE
- Lock and Dam No. 13, Lake Clinton, USACE
- Lock and Dam No. 14, Mississippi River, USACE
- Lock and Dam No. 15, Mississippi River, USACE
- Lock and Dam No. 16, Mississippi River, USACE
- Lock and Dam No. 17, Mississippi River, USACE
- Lock and Dam No. 18, Mississippi River, USACE
- Lock and Dam No. 19, Mississippi River, USACE
- Rathbun Dam, Rathbun Lake, USACE
- Red Rock Dam, Lake Red Rock, USACE
- Saylorville Dam, Saylorville Lake, USACE
- Three Mile Reservoir Dam, Three Mile Reservoir, Three Mile Reservoir Agency

== See also ==
- List of dam removals in Iowa
