= Dragoon Trail =

Historic trail in Iowa, United States

In 1933, the State of Iowa opened the Dragoon Trail, a scenic and historic drive along the Des Moines River.

The trail follows the path of the 1st U. S. Dragoons, the country's first mounted infantry unit, on their historic march in the summer of 1835, to scout Iowa after the Black Hawk Purchase of 1832 put the area under U.S. control. The march led to the establishment of outposts from present-day Fort Dodge and Webster City through Des Moines to Pella and Knoxville.

The Trail is about 200 miles long and passes cultural, historical, natural and scenic attractions including Lake Red Rock, Ledges State Park, the Kate Shelley High Bridge and Dolliver Memorial Park.

It starts with two branches originating from Fort Dodge and Webster City that join near Stratford; from there it runs through Boone and Des Moines to the Red Rock Dam between Pella and Knoxville.

For more details see Dragoon Trail.
