= Big Creek State Park =

State park in Polk County, Iowa

- Location within Iowa Location within the United States
- Interactive map of Big Creek State Park
- Location: Polk County, Iowa, United States
- Nearest city: Polk City, Iowa
- Coordinates: 41°48′59″N 93°44′44″W
- Area: 3,550 acres (1,440 ha)
- Elevation: 919 ft (280 m)
- Administrator: Iowa Department of Natural Resources
- Website: Official website

Big Creek State Park is a 3,550-acre (1,440 ha) public recreation area located 15 miles (24 km) north-northwest of Des Moines in Polk County, Iowa, United States. The park's features include an 18-hole disc golf course, hiking trails, a swimming beach, a fishing jetty and boat ramps.

== Geography ==
Big Creek State Park was built alongside the 866 acres (350 ha) manmade Big Creek Lake. Big Creek Lake was created as a result of a diversion dam to the Saylorville Lake Reservoir flood control project in the 1970s.

== Ecology ==
Known fish species in Big Creek Lake:

- Lepomis macrochirus (Bluegill)
- Ictalurus punctatus (Channel catfish)
- Pomoxis (Crappie)
- Sander vitreus (Walleye)
- Micropterus salmoides (Largemouth bass)
- Micropterus dolomieu (Smallmouth bass)
- Esox masquinongy (Muskie)
