= Douglas Township, Polk County, Iowa =

Township in Polk County, Iowa, U.S.

Coordinates: 41.73°N 93.52°W

Douglas Township is a township in Polk County, Iowa, United States.

== History ==
Douglas Township was established in 1857. It is named for Stephen A. Douglas.
