= Jefferson Township, Polk County, Iowa =

Township in Polk County, Iowa, U.S.

Coordinates: 41.73°N 93.77°W

Jefferson Township is a township in Polk County, Iowa, United States.

== History ==
Jefferson Township was established in 1851. The town of Herrold was established in the township in 1915 and purchased by the U.S. Army Corps of Engineers in 1990 for use as a military exercise range for Camp Dodge.
