= Crocker Township, Polk County, Iowa =

Township in Polk County, Iowa, U.S.

Coordinates: 41.7353°N 93.6309°W

Crocker Township is a township in Polk County, Iowa, United States.

== History ==
Crocker Township was organized in 1871. It is named for Gen. Marcellus M. Crocker.
