= Saylor Township, Polk County, Iowa =

Township in Polk County, Iowa, U.S.

Coordinates: 41.664°N 93.624°W

Saylor Township is a township in Polk County, Iowa, United States.

== History ==
Saylor Township is named after John B. Saylor, a pioneer settler.
