= Polk County, Iowa =

County in Iowa, United States

- County
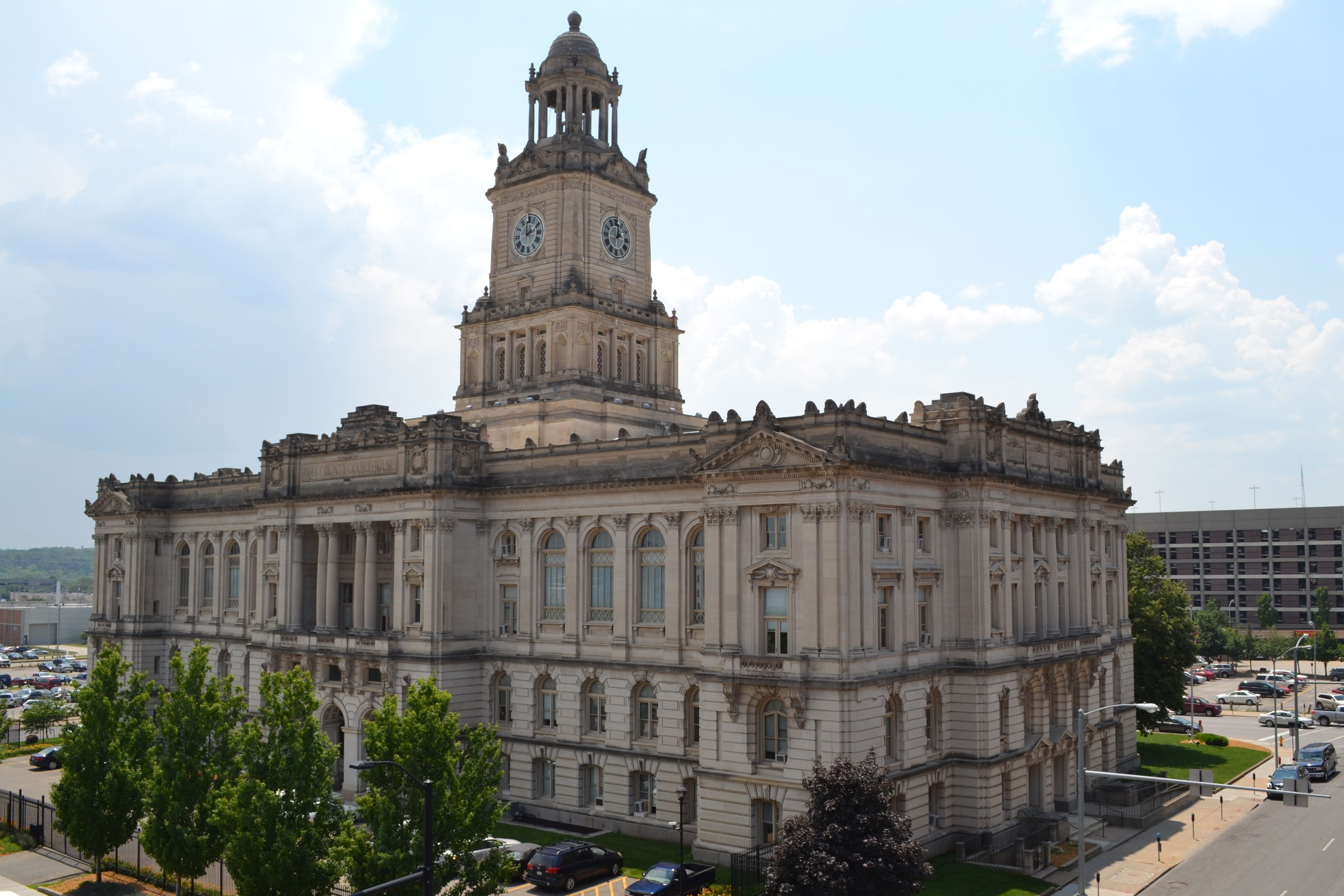
- The Polk County Courthouse in Des Moines

- Flag Seal

- Location within the U.S. state of Iowa
- Coordinates: 41.684816°N 93.568971°W
- Country: United States
- State: Iowa
- Created: January 13, 1846
- Organized: March 1, 1846
- Named for: James K. Polk
- Seat: Des Moines
- Largest city: Des Moines

Area
  - Total: 591.888 sq mi (1,532.98 km^{2})
  - Land: 572.720 sq mi (1,483.34 km^{2})
  - Water: 19.168 sq mi (49.64 km^{2}) 3.24%

Population (2020)
  - Total: 492,401
  - Estimate (2025): 516,546 ▲
  - Density: 859.759/sq mi (331.955/km^{2})
- Time zone: UTC−6 (Central)
  - Summer (DST): UTC−5 (CDT)
- Area code: 515
- Congressional district: 3rd
- Website: polkcountyiowa.gov
- Iowa county number 77

Polk County is a county located in the U.S. state of Iowa. As of the 2020 census, the population was 492,401, and was estimated to be 516,546 in 2025, making it the most populous county in Iowa. The county seat and the largest city is Des Moines, which is also the capital city of Iowa. Polk County is included in the Des Moines–West Des Moines, IA Metropolitan Statistical Area.

== History ==
Polk County was formed on January 13, 1846 and organized on March 1, 1846., the legislative body of the Iowa Territory authorized the creation of twelve counties in the Territory, with general descriptions of their boundaries. On January 17 they further enacted a resolution setting the effective date of the county government for Jasper and Polk Counties as March 1, 1846. Polk County's name referred to United States President James K. Polk, who served from 1845 to 1849.

The first courthouse, a two-story structure, was built in Des Moines in 1846. Rapid settlement and commercial growth in the county soon rendered this building insufficient, so construction of a larger building was initiated in 1858. Due to construction delays and the onset of the Civil War, the structure was not completed until 1866. The present courthouse was erected in 1906, and in 1962 it was extensively renovated and enlarged.

== Geography ==
According to the United States Census Bureau, the county has a total area of 591.888 square miles (1,532.98 km^{2}), of which 572.720 square miles (1,483.34 km^{2}) is land and 19.168 square miles (49.64 km^{2}) (3.24%) is water. It is the 41st-largest county in Iowa by total area The county is bisected by the Des Moines River.

=== Major highways ===
- Interstate 35
- Interstate 80
- Interstate 235
- U.S. Highway 6
- U.S. Highway 65
- U.S Route 69
- Iowa Highway 5
- Iowa Highway 17
- Iowa Highway 28
- Iowa Highway 141
- Iowa Highway 160
- Iowa Highway 163
- Iowa Highway 210
- Iowa Highway 415

=== Transit ===
- Des Moines Area Regional Transit
- Burlington Trailways
- Jefferson Lines
- Des Moines Bus Station

== Demographics ==
Historical population
Census	Pop.	Note	%±
1850	4,513		—
1860	11,625		157.6%
1870	27,857		139.6%
1880	42,395		52.2%
1890	65,410		54.3%
1900	82,624		26.3%
1910	110,438		33.7%
1920	154,029		39.5%
1930	172,837		12.2%
1940	195,835		13.3%
1950	226,010		15.4%
1960	266,315		17.8%
1970	286,101		7.4%
1980	303,170		6.0%
1990	327,140		7.9%
2000	374,601		14.5%
2010	430,640		15.0%
2020	492,401		14.3%
2025 (est.)	516,546	▲	4.9%
U.S. Decennial Census; 1790–1960 1900–1990; 1990–2000 2010–2020

As of the second quarter of 2025, the median home value in Polk County was $293,337.

As of the 2024 American Community Survey, there are 211,294 estimated households in Polk County with an average of 2.40 persons per household. The county has a median household income of $82,405. Approximately 9.9% of the county's population lives at or below the poverty line. Polk County has an estimated 69.4% employment rate, with 41.5% of the population holding a bachelor's degree or higher and 92.4% holding a high school diploma. There were 224,898 housing units at an average density of 392.68 per square mile (151.6/km^{2}).

The top five reported languages (people were allowed to report up to two languages, thus the figures will generally add to more than 100%) were English (85.0%), Spanish (6.6%), Indo-European (3.2%), Asian and Pacific Islander (3.4%), and Other (1.9%).

The median age in the county was 36.2 years.

Polk County, Iowa – racial and ethnic composition Note: the US Census treats Hispanic/Latino as an ethnic category. This table excludes Latinos from the racial categories and assigns them to a separate category. Hispanics/Latinos may be of any race.
Race / ethnicity (NH = non-Hispanic)	Pop. 1980	Pop. 1990	Pop. 2000	Pop. 2010	Pop. 2020
White alone (NH)	280,143 (92.40%)	299,469 (91.54%)	323,785 (86.43%)	347,710 (80.74%)	362,260 (73.57%)
Black or African American alone (NH)	13,570 (4.48%)	14,618 (4.47%)	17,874 (4.77%)	25,344 (5.89%)	34,990 (7.11%)
Native American or Alaska Native alone (NH)	712 (0.23%)	834 (0.25%)	878 (0.23%)	894 (0.21%)	1,081 (0.22%)
Asian alone (NH)	2,204 (0.73%)	5,871 (1.79%)	9,765 (2.61%)	15,118 (3.51%)	24,313 (4.94%)
Pacific Islander alone (NH)	—	—	178 (0.05%)	228 (0.05%)	280 (0.06%)
Other race alone (NH)	1,962 (0.65%)	187 (0.06%)	554 (0.15%)	605 (0.14%)	1,713 (0.35%)
Mixed race or multiracial (NH)	—	—	5,077 (1.36%)	8,094 (1.88%)	19,709 (4.00%)
Hispanic or Latino (any race)	4,579 (1.51%)	6,161 (1.88%)	16,490 (4.40%)	32,647 (7.58%)	48,055 (9.76%)
Total	303,170 (100.00%)	327,140 (100.00%)	374,601 (100.00%)	430,640 (100.00%)	492,401 (100.00%)

=== 2024 estimate ===
As of the 2024 estimate, there were 516,185 people, 211,294 households, and _ families residing in the county. The population density was 901.29 inhabitants per square mile (348.0/km^{2}). There were 224,898 housing units at an average density of 392.68 per square mile (151.6/km^{2}). The racial makeup of the county was 82.8% White (72.7% NH White), 8.2% African American, 0.6% Native American, 5.5% Asian, 0.1% Pacific Islander, _% from some other races and 2.8% from two or more races. Hispanic or Latino people of any race were 11.2% of the population.

=== 2020 census ===
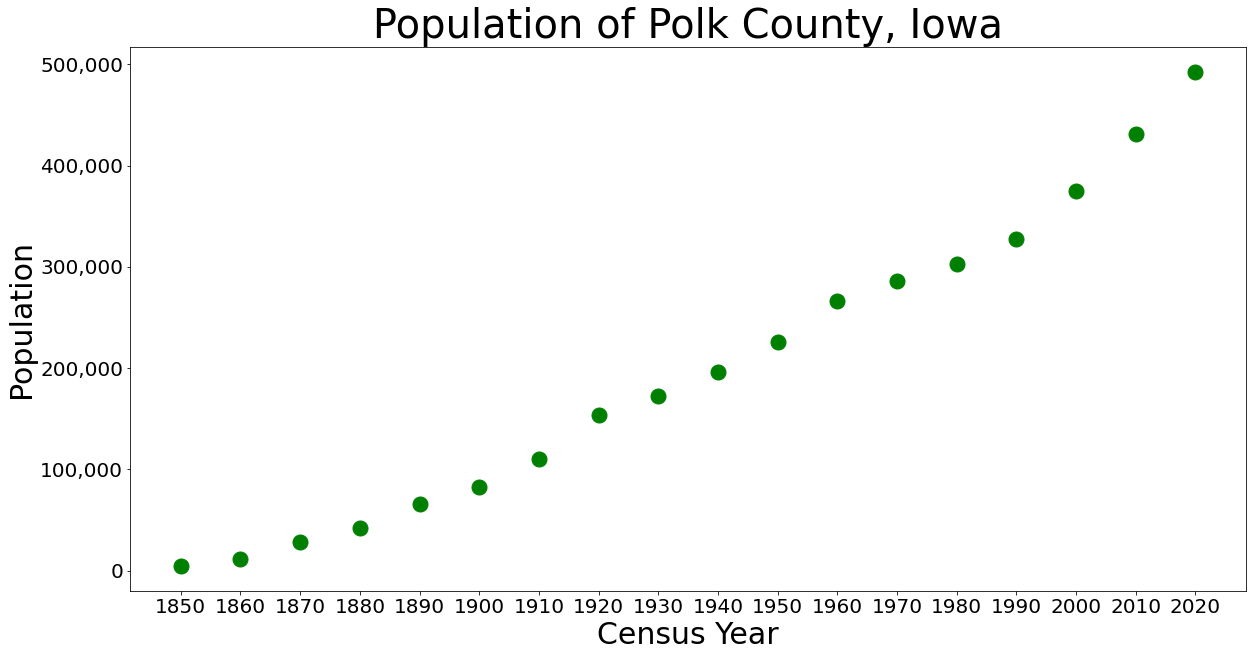
Population of Polk County from the U.S. census data

As of the 2020 census, there were 492,401 people, 196,891 households, and 121,993 families residing in the county. The population density was 859.76 inhabitants per square mile (332.0/km^{2}). There were 210,184 housing units at an average density of 366.99 per square mile (141.7/km^{2}). The racial makeup of the county was 75.93% White, 7.23% African American, 0.46% Native American, 4.98% Asian, 0.06% Pacific Islander, 3.88% from some other races and 7.45% from two or more races. Hispanic or Latino people of any race were 9.76% of the population.

The median age was 36.0 years. 24.5% of residents were under the age of 18 and 14.1% of residents were 65 years of age or older. For every 100 females there were 96.6 males, and for every 100 females age 18 and over there were 94.6 males age 18 and over.

95.5% of residents lived in urban areas, while 4.5% lived in rural areas.

There were 196,891 households in the county, of which 31.1% had children under the age of 18 living in them. Of all households, 45.9% were married-couple households, 19.7% were households with a male householder and no spouse or partner present, and 26.7% were households with a female householder and no spouse or partner present. About 30.1% of all households were made up of individuals and 10.2% had someone living alone who was 65 years of age or older. There were 210,184 housing units, of which 6.3% were vacant. Among occupied housing units, 65.7% were owner-occupied and 34.3% were renter-occupied. The homeowner vacancy rate was 1.5% and the rental vacancy rate was 9.4%.

=== 2010 census ===
As of the 2010 census, there were 430,640 people, 170,197 households, and _ families residing in the county. The population density was 750.5 inhabitants per square mile (289.8/km^{2}). There were 182,262 housing units at an average density of 317.6 per square mile (122.6/km^{2}). The racial makeup of the county was 84.73% White, 6.00% African American, 0.32% Native American, 3.53% Asian, 0.06% Pacific Islander, 2.93% from some other races and 2.42% from two or more races. Hispanic or Latino people of any race were 7.58% of the population.

=== 2000 census ===
As of the 2000 census, there were 374,601 people, 149,112 households, and 96,624 families residing in the county. The population density was 658.3 inhabitants per square mile (254.2/km^{2}). There were 156,447 housing units at an average density of 275.0 per square mile (106.2/km^{2}). The racial makeup of the county was 88.34% White, 4.84% African American, 0.27% Native American, 2.63% Asian, 0.06% Pacific Islander, 2.22% from some other races and 1.66% from two or more races. Hispanic or Latino people of any race were 4.40% of the population. 25.9% were of German, 10.6% Irish, 9.0% English and 8.4% American ancestry.

Of the 149,112 households 32.20% had children under the age of 18 living with them, 51.00% were married couples living together, 10.30% had a female householder with no husband present, and 35.20% were non-families. 28.10% of households were one person and 8.60% were one person aged 65 or older. The average household size was 2.45 and the average family size was 3.04.

Age spread: 25.70% under the age of 18, 9.40% from 18 to 24, 32.20% from 25 to 44, 21.50% from 45 to 64, and 11.10% 65 or older. The median age was 34 years. For every 100 females, there were 94.20 males. For every 100 females age 18 and over, there were 90.70 males.

The median household income was $46,116 and the median family income was $56,560. Males had a median income of $37,182 versus $28,000 for females. The per capita income for the county was $23,654. About 5.30% of families and 7.90% of the population were below the poverty line, including 9.70% of those under age 18 and 6.40% of those age 65 or over.

== Government and infrastructure ==
The Iowa Department of Corrections Iowa Correctional Institution for Women is in Mitchellville and in Polk County.

United States presidential election results for Polk County, Iowa
Year	Republican		Democratic		Third party(ies)	
Year	No.	%	No.	%	No.	%
1880	4,781	58.50%	2,161	26.44%	1,230	15.05%
1884	6,122	56.06%	4,768	43.66%	30	0.27%
1888	7,049	57.48%	4,966	40.50%	248	2.02%
1892	7,757	53.76%	5,538	38.38%	1,133	7.85%
1896	11,127	60.24%	7,087	38.37%	257	1.39%
1900	12,628	64.72%	6,180	31.67%	703	3.60%
1904	14,113	72.53%	3,086	15.86%	2,259	11.61%
1908	12,555	58.02%	7,924	36.62%	1,161	5.37%
1912	4,665	20.66%	7,239	32.07%	10,671	47.27%
1916	11,295	45.81%	12,327	50.00%	1,034	4.19%
1920	36,073	66.82%	16,281	30.16%	1,632	3.02%
1924	37,491	62.21%	6,665	11.06%	16,114	26.74%
1928	42,290	67.65%	19,725	31.55%	498	0.80%
1932	34,023	49.54%	31,517	45.89%	3,132	4.56%
1936	33,819	42.56%	44,274	55.72%	1,367	1.72%
1940	41,245	44.26%	51,647	55.42%	301	0.32%
1944	36,629	44.07%	46,072	55.43%	417	0.50%
1948	33,742	41.46%	45,289	55.65%	2,348	2.89%
1952	60,934	54.03%	50,867	45.10%	982	0.87%
1956	62,392	54.02%	53,025	45.91%	74	0.06%
1960	64,077	53.74%	55,091	46.20%	66	0.06%
1964	37,280	33.30%	74,194	66.27%	479	0.43%
1968	51,814	45.14%	52,731	45.94%	10,239	8.92%
1972	70,245	52.95%	59,169	44.60%	3,245	2.45%
1976	62,316	45.23%	71,917	52.20%	3,530	2.56%
1980	64,156	44.63%	61,984	43.12%	17,618	12.26%
1984	71,413	48.30%	75,413	51.01%	1,022	0.69%
1988	57,854	40.42%	84,476	59.01%	814	0.57%
1992	63,708	38.09%	78,585	46.98%	24,965	14.93%
1996	60,884	39.00%	83,877	53.73%	11,345	7.27%
2000	79,927	45.89%	89,715	51.51%	4,525	2.60%
2004	95,828	47.29%	105,218	51.93%	1,572	0.78%
2008	89,668	41.82%	120,984	56.43%	3,757	1.75%
2012	96,096	41.98%	128,465	56.13%	4,321	1.89%
2016	93,492	40.38%	119,804	51.74%	18,259	7.89%
2020	106,800	41.27%	146,250	56.52%	5,705	2.20%
2024	112,240	43.70%	140,075	54.54%	4,523	1.76%

=== Population ranking ===
The population ranking of the following table is based on the 2020 census of Polk County.

† county seat

Rank	City/Town/etc.	Municipal type	Population (2020 Census)	Population (2024 Estimate)
1	Des Moines † (partially in Warren County)	City	214,133	213,096
2	Ankeny	City	67,887	76,727
3	West Des Moines (partially in Dallas, Warren and Madison Counties)	City	68,723	73,664
4	Urbandale (partially in Dallas County)	City	45,580	48,119
5	Johnston	City	24,064	25,292
6	Altoona	City	19,565	22,598
7	Clive (partially in Dallas County)	City	18,601	19,808
8	Grimes (partially in Dallas County)	City	15,392	17,766
9	Norwalk (mostly in Warren County)	City	12,799	15,396
10	Pleasant Hill	City	10,147	12,012
11	Bondurant	City	7,365	9,565
12	Polk City	City	5,543	6,545
13	Windsor Heights	City	5,252	5,106
14	Carlisle (partially in Warren County)	City	4,160	4,512
15	Saylorville	CDP	3,584	3,622
16	Mitchellville (partially in Jasper County)	City	2,485	2,717
17	Granger (mostly in Dallas County)	City	1,654	2,191
18	Elkhart	City	882	1,165
19	Runnells	City	457	467
20	Alleman	City	423	447
21	Sheldahl (partially in Boone and Story Counties)	City	297	326

== Education ==
School districts include:

- Ankeny Community School District, Ankeny
- Ballard Community School District, Huxley
- Bondurant–Farrar Community School District, Bondurant
- Carlisle Community School District, Carlisle
- Collins–Maxwell Community School District, Maxwell
- Dallas Center–Grimes Community School District, Grimes
- Des Moines Independent Community School District, Des Moines
- Johnston Community School District, Johnston
- Madrid Community School District, Madrid
- North Polk Community School District, Alleman
- PCM Community School District, Monroe
- Saydel Community School District, Des Moines
- Southeast Polk Community School District, Pleasant Hill
- Urbandale Community School District, Urbandale
- West Des Moines Community School District, West Des Moines
- Woodward-Granger Community School District, Granger

== Attractions ==
- Adventureland Resort
- Blank Park Zoo
- Casey's Center
- Iowa State Capitol
- Iowa State Fair
- Living History Farms
- Science Center of Iowa
- Valley Junction

== Communities ==
=== Cities ===
- Alleman
- Altoona
- Ankeny
- Bondurant
- Carlisle
- Clive
- Des Moines
- Elkhart
- Granger
- Grimes
- Johnston
- Mitchellville
- Norwalk
- Pleasant Hill
- Polk City
- Runnells
- Sheldahl
- Urbandale
- West Des Moines
- Windsor Heights

=== Census-designated place ===
- Saylorville

=== Unincorporated communities ===
- Adelphi
- Andrews
- Avon
- Avon Lake
- Berwick
- Capitol Heights
- Crocker
- Enterprise
- Farrar
- Herrold
- Ivy
- Lovington
- Norwoodville
- Oralabor
- Polk City Junction
- Rising Sun
- Santiago
- Saylor
- Swanwood
- White Oak
- Zook Spur

=== Townships ===
- Allen
- Beaver
- Bloomfield
- Camp
- Clay
- Crocker
- Delaware
- Des Moines
- Douglas
- Elkhart
- Four Mile
- Franklin
- Jefferson
- Lee
- Lincoln
- Madison
- Saylor
- Union
- Walnut
- Washington
- Webster

== See also ==
- Polk County Courthouse
- Iowa State Capitol
- Terrace Hill also known as Hubbell Mansion, Benjamin F. Allen House, or the Iowa Governor's Mansion
- National Register of Historic Places listings in Polk County, Iowa
