= National Register of Historic Places listings in Polk County, Iowa =

Location of Polk County in Iowa

This is a list of the National Register of Historic Places listings in Polk County, Iowa.

This is intended to be a complete list of the properties and districts on the National Register of Historic Places in Polk County, Iowa, United States. Latitude and longitude coordinates are provided for many National Register properties and districts; these locations may be seen together in an online map.

There are 205 properties and districts listed on the National Register in the county, including 2 National Historic Landmarks. The city of Des Moines is the location of 190 of these properties and districts, including the 2 National Historic Landmarks; they are listed separately, while the remaining 15 properties and districts are listed here.

This National Park Service list is complete through NPS recent listings posted April 3, 2026.

== Current listings ==
=== Outside Des Moines ===
	Name on the Register	Image	Date listed	Location	City or town	Description
1	Richard L. and Verda M. Alleman Farm Historic District	Richard L. and Verda M. Alleman Farm Historic District	May 1, 2015 (#15000192)	2701 NW. 158th Ave. 41°50′59″N 93°39′15″W	Slater vicinity	
2	Big Creek Schoolhouse	Big Creek Schoolhouse	August 11, 2004 (#04000816)	112 3rd St. 41°46′14″N 93°42′51″W	Polk City	
3	Camp Dodge Pool District	Camp Dodge Pool District	February 17, 1995 (#95000098)	Buildings A22-A24 at Camp Dodge; 41°42′12″N 93°42′34″W	Johnston	
4	Flynn Farm, Mansion, and Barn	Flynn Farm, Mansion, and Barn	November 30, 1973 (#73000737)	2600 111th St. 41°37′18″N 93°46′33″W	Urbandale	
5	Herrold Bridge	Herrold Bridge	May 15, 1998 (#98000490)	NW. 88th Ave. over Beaver Creek; 41°43′19″N 93°44′59″W	Herrold	
6	I.O.O.F. (International Order of Odd Fellows) Valley Junction Lodge Hall No. 604	I.O.O.F. (International Order of Odd Fellows) Valley Junction Lodge Hall No. 604	November 8, 2017 (#100001793)	216-218 5th St. 41°34′18″N 93°42′32″W	West Des Moines	
7	Jordan House	Jordan House	December 10, 1973 (#73000738)	2251 Fuller Rd. 41°33′36″N 93°44′05″W	West Des Moines	
8	Lustron House #02437		June 9, 2020 (#100005272)	1440 63rd St. 41°36′19″N 93°42′15″W	Windsor Heights	
9	Olmsted Family Farmhouse	Olmsted Family Farmhouse	August 6, 2019 (#100004230)	4010 70th St. 41°38′00″N 93°42′44″W	Urbandale	Now houses the local historical society.
10	Paul J. and Ida Trier House	Paul J. and Ida Trier House	November 9, 1988 (#88002148)	6880 N.W. Beaver Dr. 41°41′10″N 93°41′21″W	Johnston	
11	Universalist Church	Universalist Church	September 6, 2005 (#05000253)	420 4th St. 41°40′16″N 93°21′41″W	Mitchellville	
12	Val-Air Ballroom	Val-Air Ballroom	October 26, 2022 (#100008304)	301 Ashworth Rd. 41°35′07″N 93°42′23″W	West Des Moines	
13	Valley Auto Co.-Morgan Auto Co. Garage		May 14, 2021 (#100006523)	333 5th St. 41°34′26″N 93°42′31″W	West Des Moines	
14	Valley Junction Commercial Historic District	Valley Junction Commercial Historic District	October 11, 2017 (#100001739)	100-318 5th St. (even side 300 only) & cross streets 41°34′17″N 93°42′32″W	West Des Moines	
15	Valley Junction-West Des Moines City Hall and Engine House	Valley Junction-West Des Moines City Hall and Engine House	February 17, 1983 (#83000400)	137 5th St. 41°34′15″N 93°42′29″W	West Des Moines	Built in 1905.

== See also ==
- List of National Historic Landmarks in Iowa
- National Register of Historic Places listings in Iowa
- Listings in neighboring counties: Boone, Dallas, Jasper, Madison, Marion, Story, Warren
