= Living History Farms =

Agricultural history museum in Iowa, US

Coordinates: 41.617°N 93.771°W

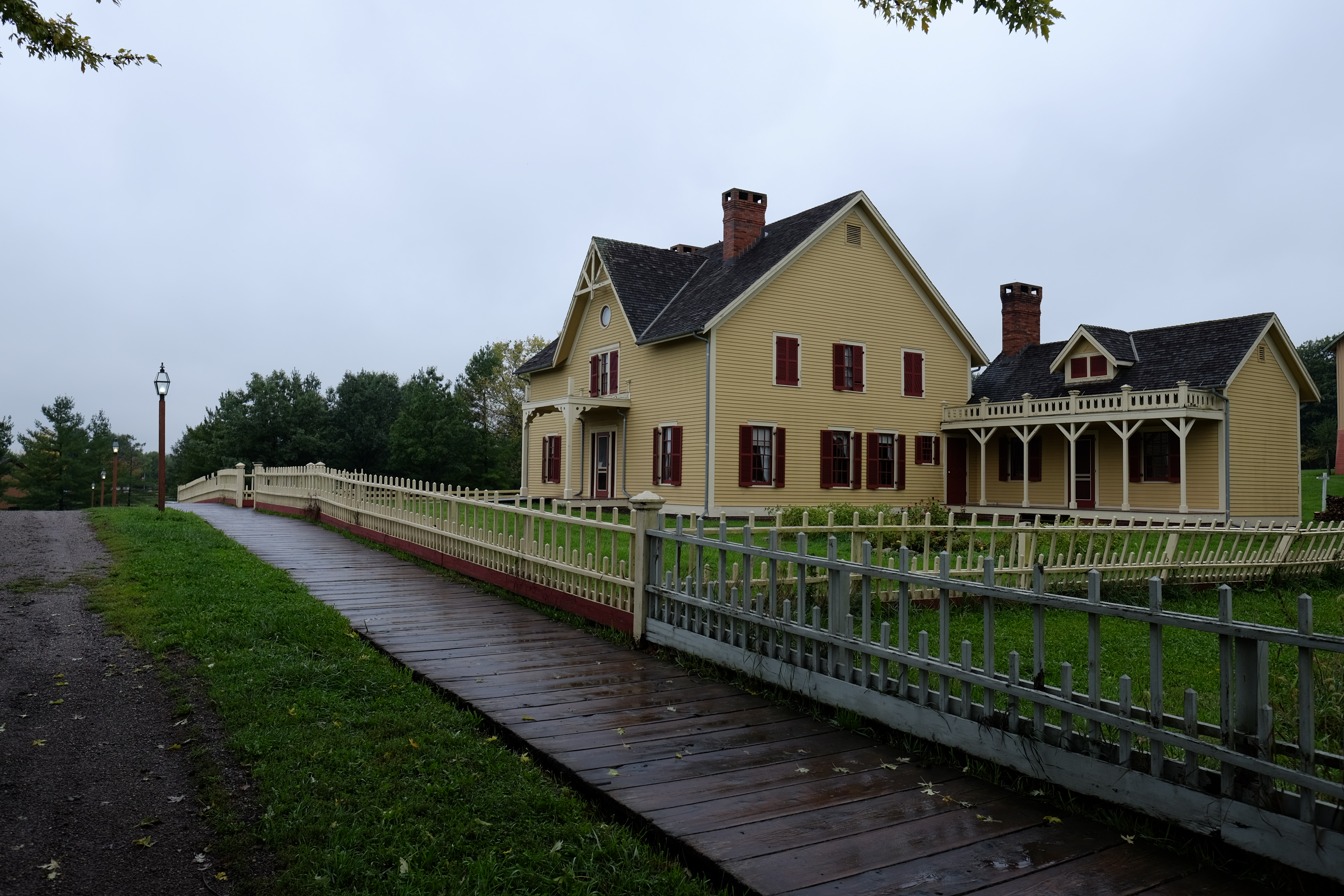
Tangen Home in 1875 town of Walnut Hill

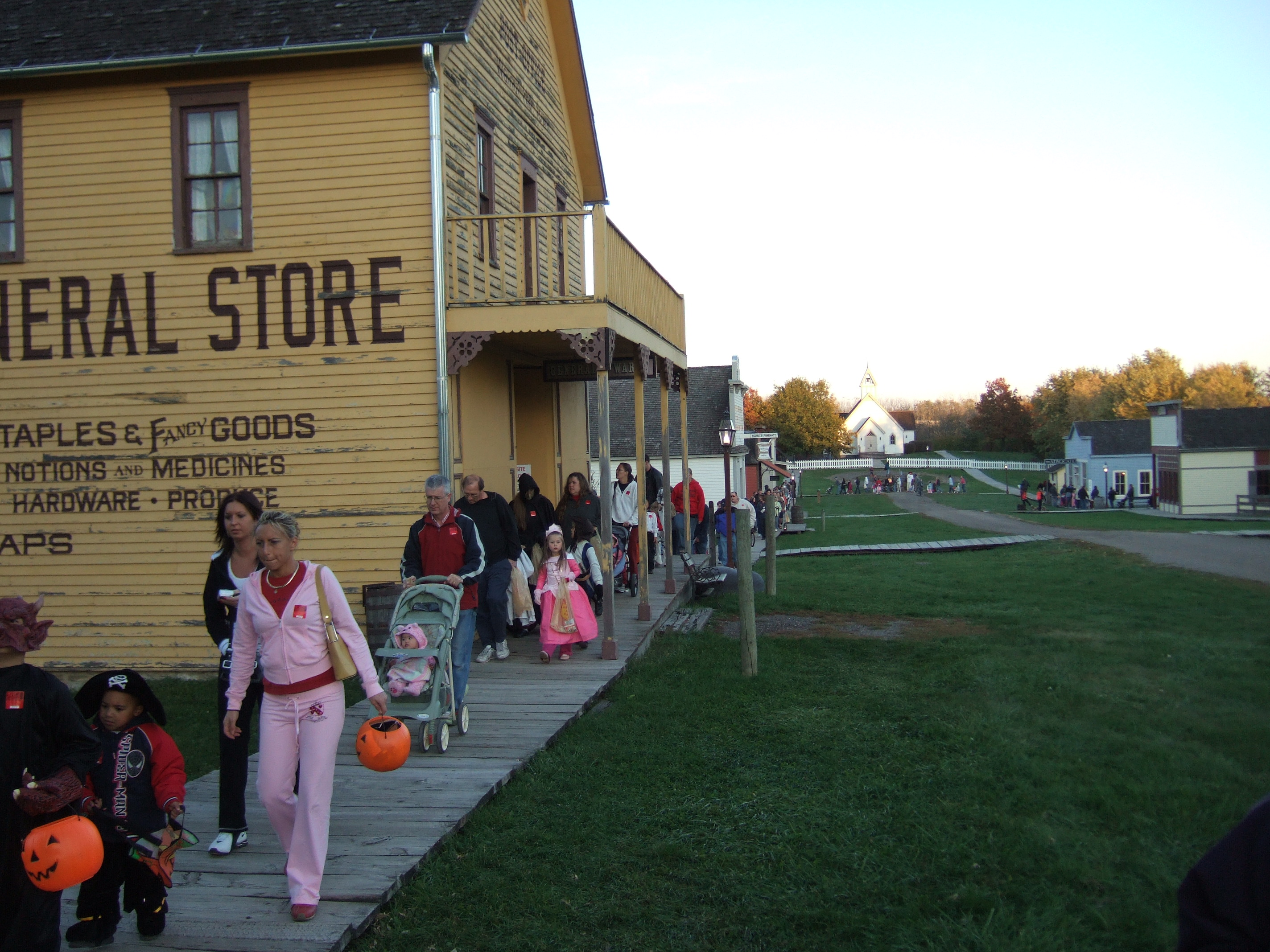
General Store

Living History Farms is a 500-acre open-air museum located in Urbandale, Iowa, United States. The museum's mission is to educate and connect all peoples to the many stories of Midwestern rural heritage. As its name implies, the museum follows the methodology of living history in depicting the lives of people living on farms in the years of 1700, 1850, and 1900, engaging in various agricultural activities.

== History ==
Dr. William G. Murray, an agricultural economist from Iowa State University and two-time gubernatorial candidate, founded the organization, which opened to the public in 1970. Dr. Murray's passion was not to have a museum where people viewed things under glass, but rather a place where history was lived.

Living History Farms was the site of Pope John Paul II's ecumenical service, Mass, and homily to an audience of around 340,000 on October 4, 1979. During his homily, the Pope spoke about the importance of farming and linked the people who worked the land with the sustenance of the people of the country. He also spoke of the importance of land conservation.

== About ==
The museum is divided by Interstate 35/80 and a tractor-drawn cart transports visitors from the town (which is next to the entrance at the Visitor Center) to the west side of the museum. After visiting the 1700 Ioway Farm, 1850 Farm, and 1900 Farm, visitors return to the east side of the interstate. The 1876 town of Walnut Hill features multiple structures, including the Martin and Ellen Flynn Home and barn, both original to the site.

The 1700 Ioway Indian Farm features the farming techniques of the Ioway Indians. Archaeologist Mildred Mott Wedel was consulted for the design of this project. The farm includes produce originating from the 1700s including blue corn and Omaha melons. Interpreters inform visitors about the Ioway lifestyle including topics such as hunting, roles of men and women, and tool making. Demonstrations include tanning hide, food preparation, and making traditional pottery.

The 1850 Pioneer Farm includes a log cabin where visitors are able to see how women cooked with cast iron over a fire, as well as tasks done by hand such as wool spinning and candle making. Outside visitors can see an ox driven plow till the fields filled with crops of corn, wheat, and potatoes.

The 1875 Town of Walnut Hill features a general store, schoolhouse, Victorian mansion, bank, and law office among other pioneer town buildings. The town portrays the relationship and dependency between the town's people, the merchants, and the farmers.

The 1900 Horse Powered Farm demonstrates the changes that modern machinery and the Industrial Revolution had on farm life. Handwork was replaced by the use of machinery, and work within the farm house changed to include methods such as canning.

The particular type of interpretation employed at Living History Farms is third person, so while the people visitors interact with in the museum may be dressed in the manner of the appropriate time period, they do not attempt to "act" as if they are truly the person they are interpreting (accents, etc.). The presenters often perform the work, and thus will say, "I baked this bread," or they address audiences with phrases such as "This is how a Print Shop would look in the year 1875." However, since the presenters do not role play, visitors can ask questions about modern issues and receive direct answers.

Living History Farms

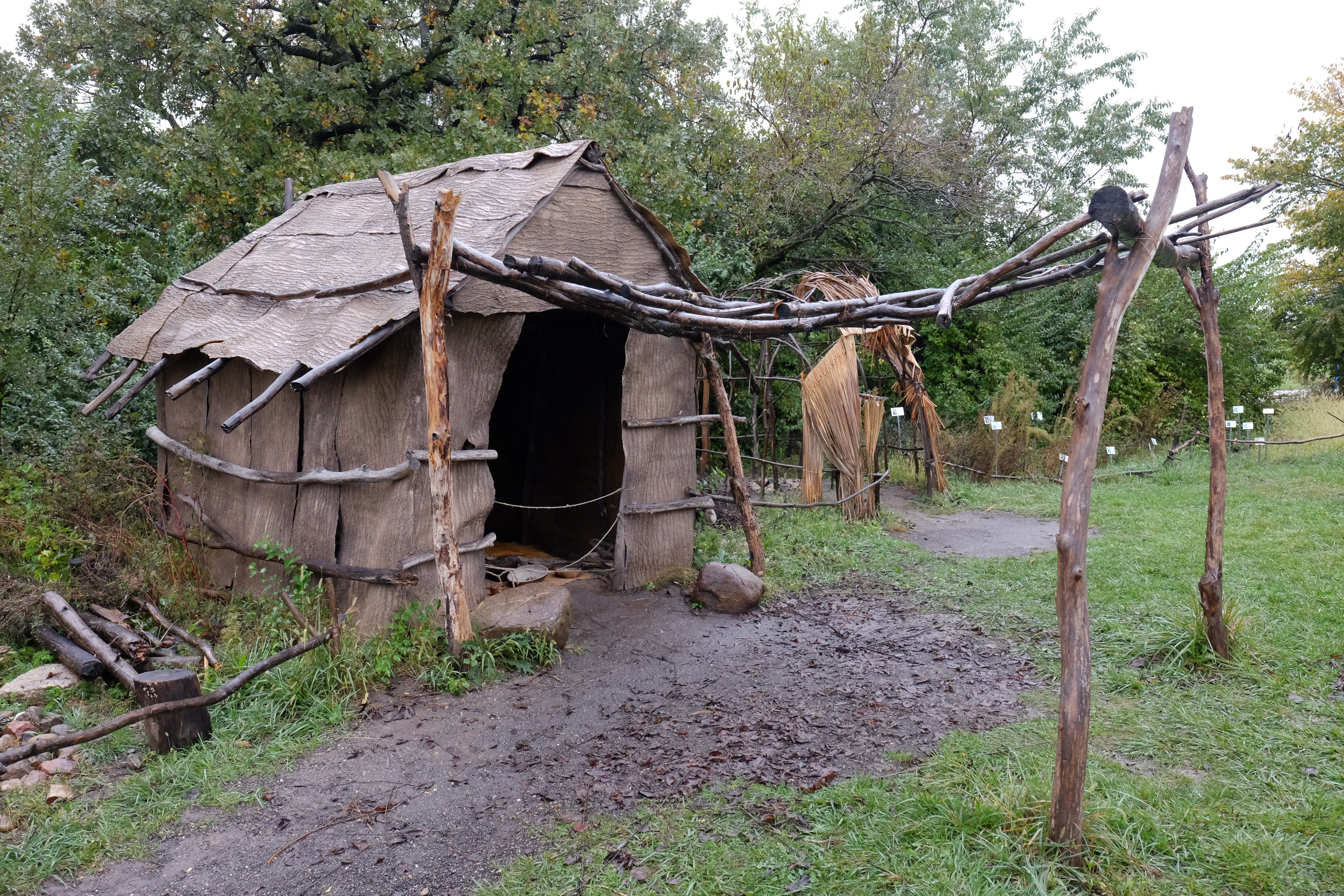
1700 Ioway Farm

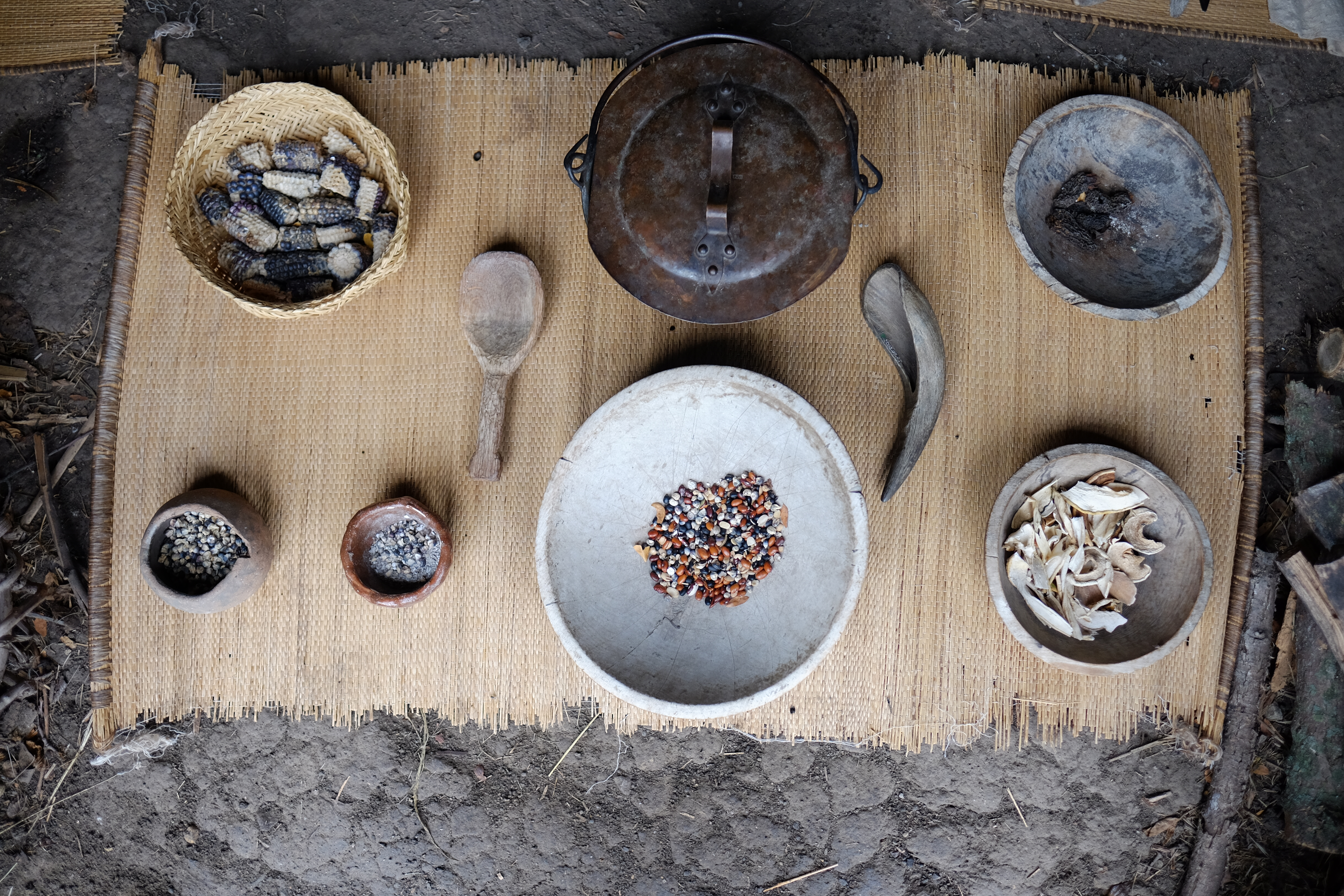
1700 Ioway Farm

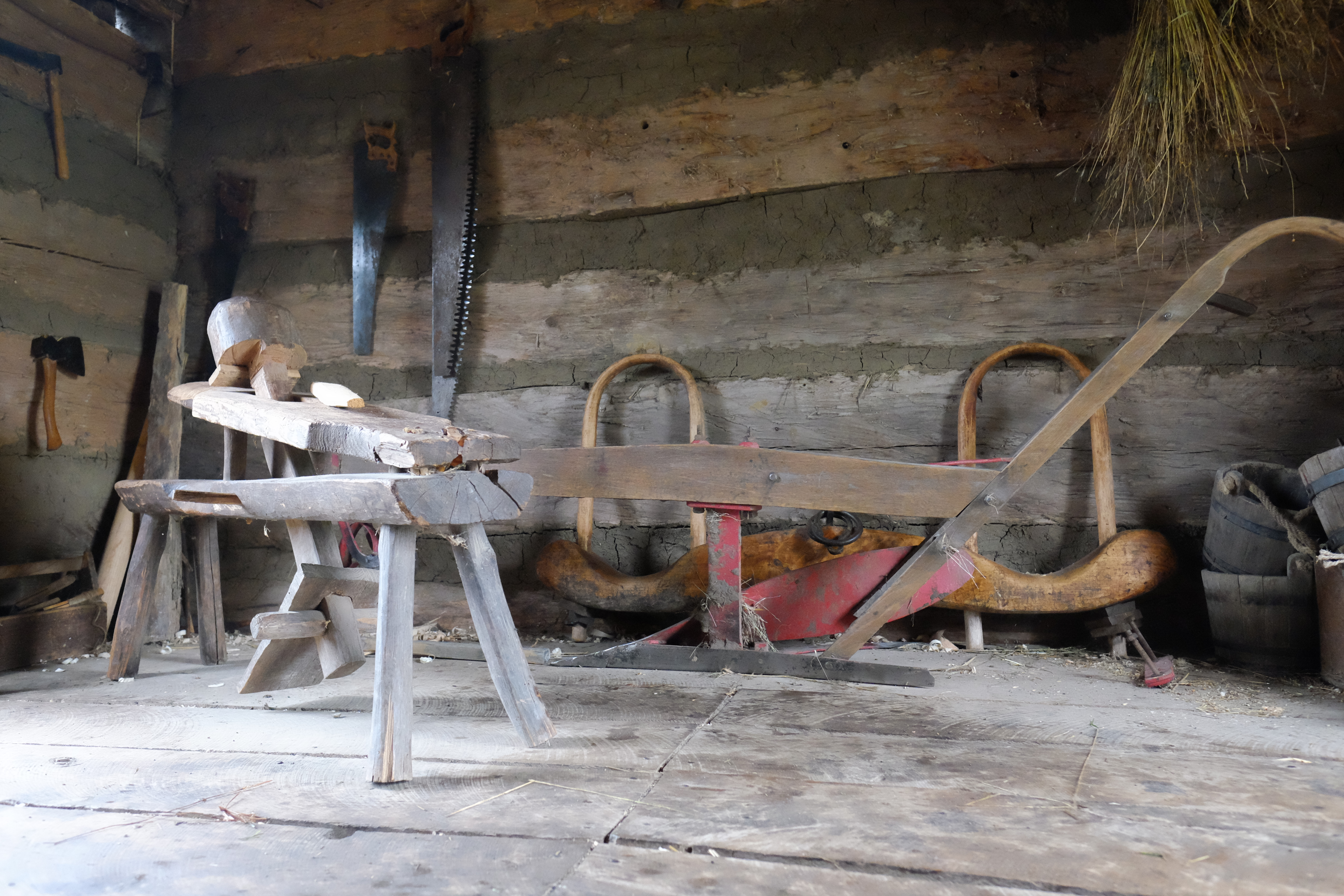
1850 Pioneer farm

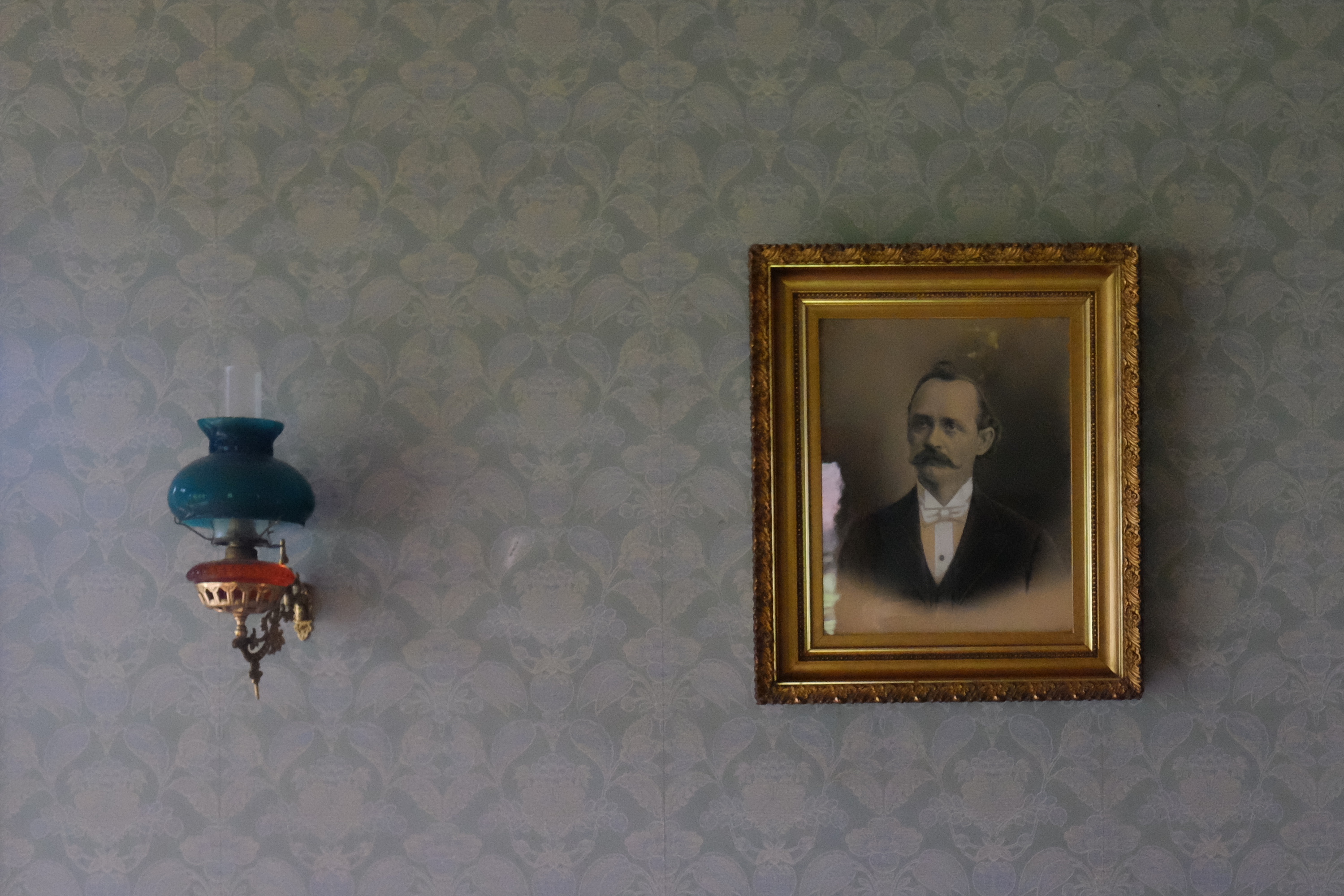
Bank in 1875 Town of Walnut Hill

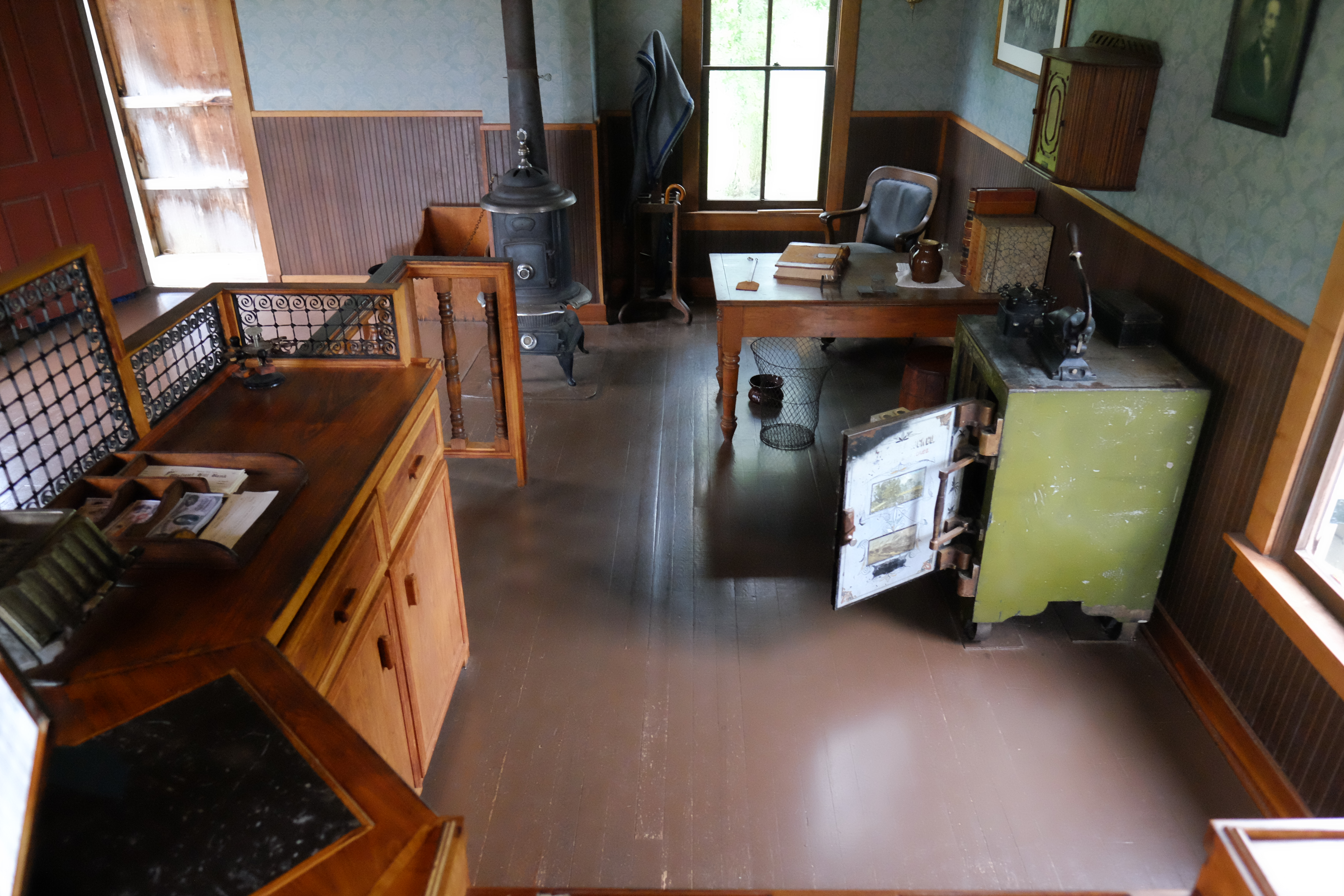
Bank in 1875 Town of Walnut Hill

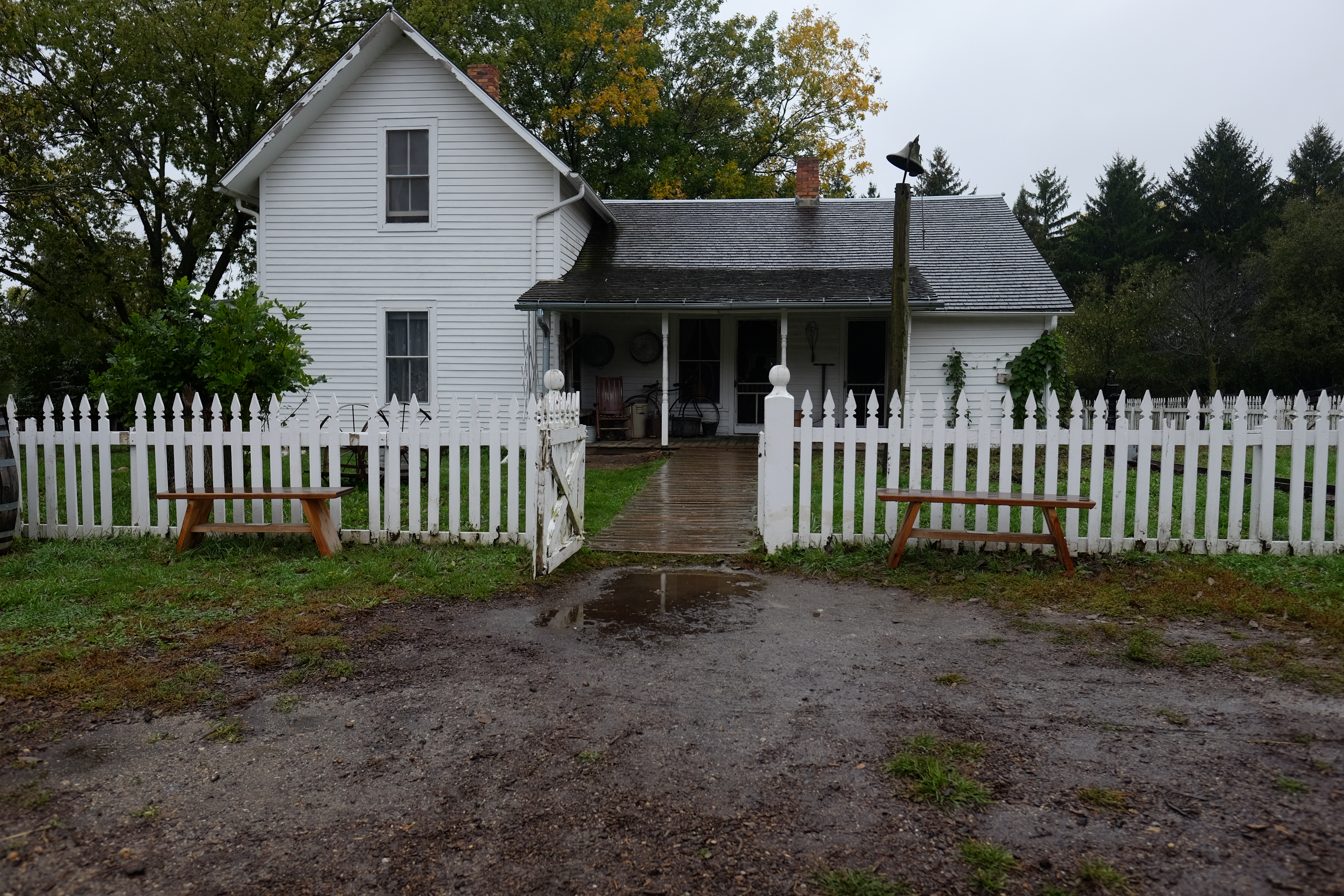
1900 Farm house

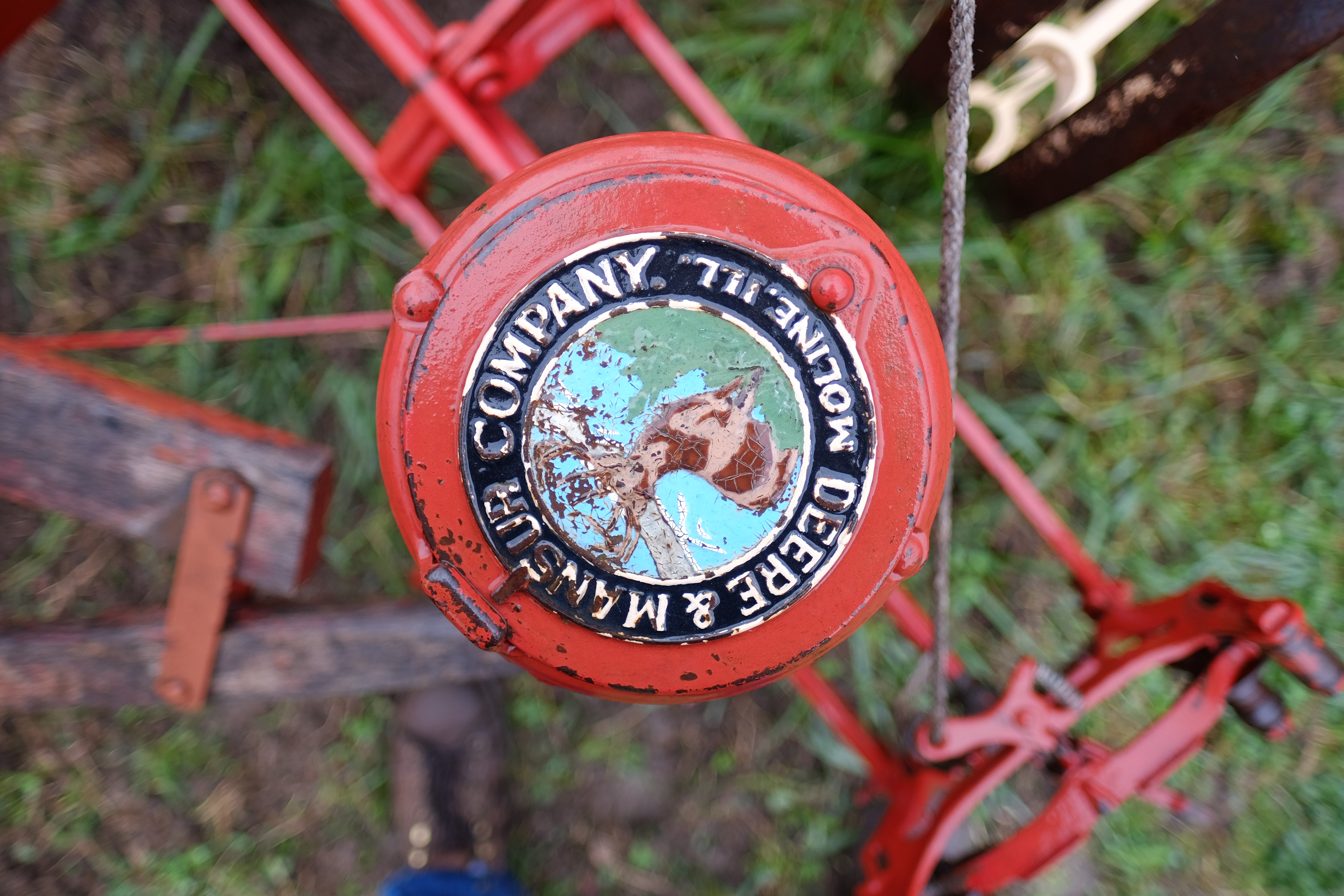
John Deere corn planter at 1900 Farm

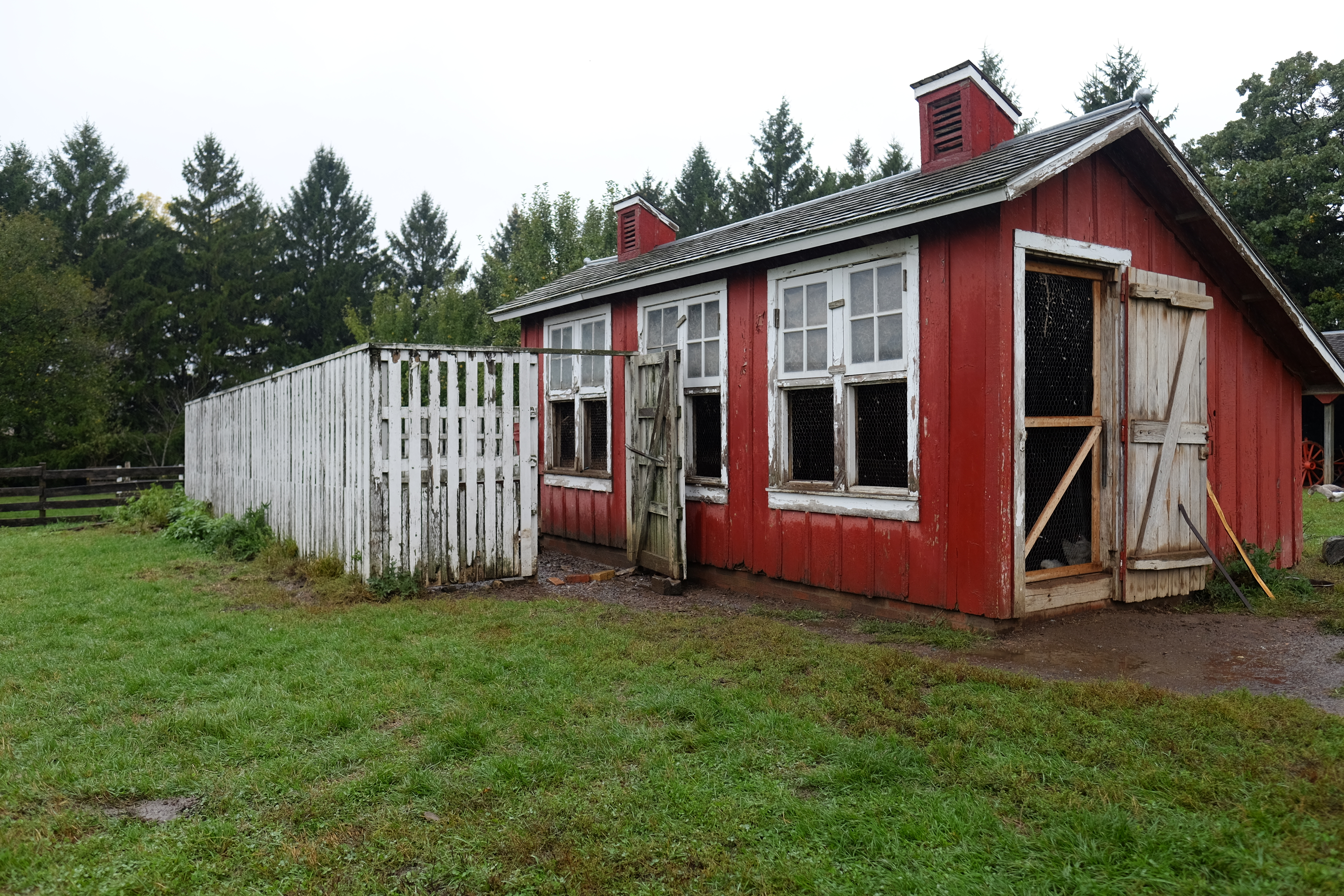
1900 Farm

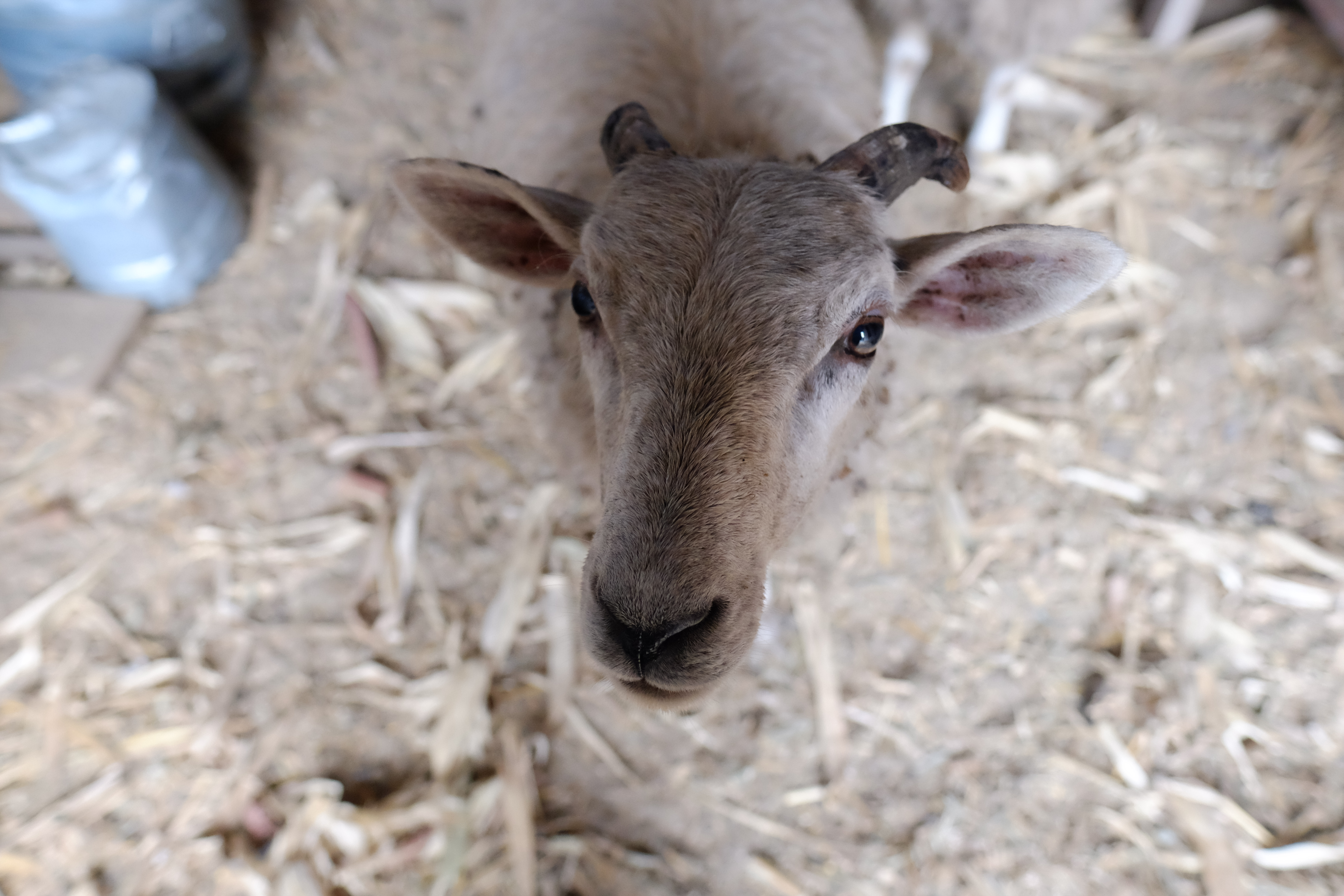
1900 Farm

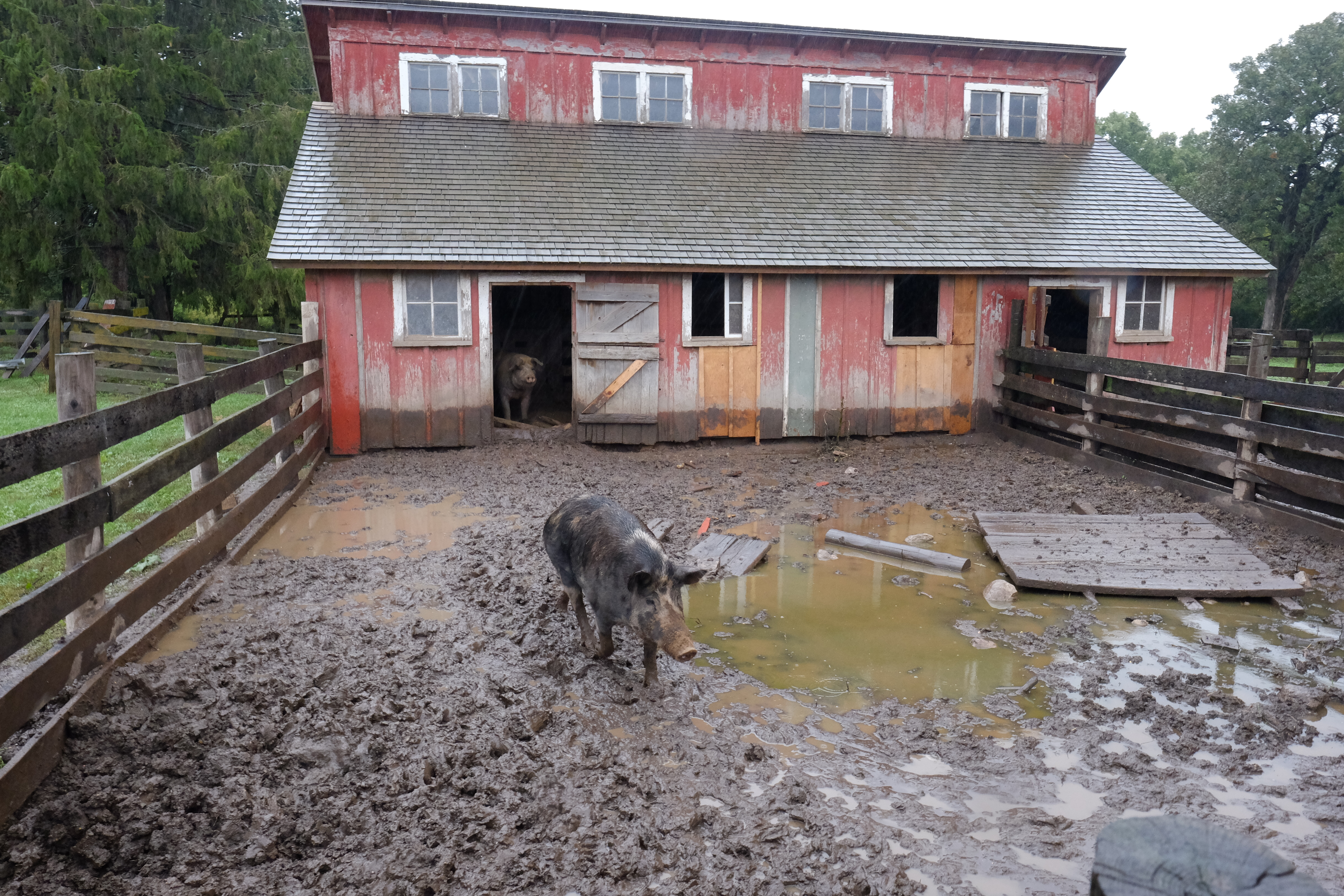
1900 Farm pigs

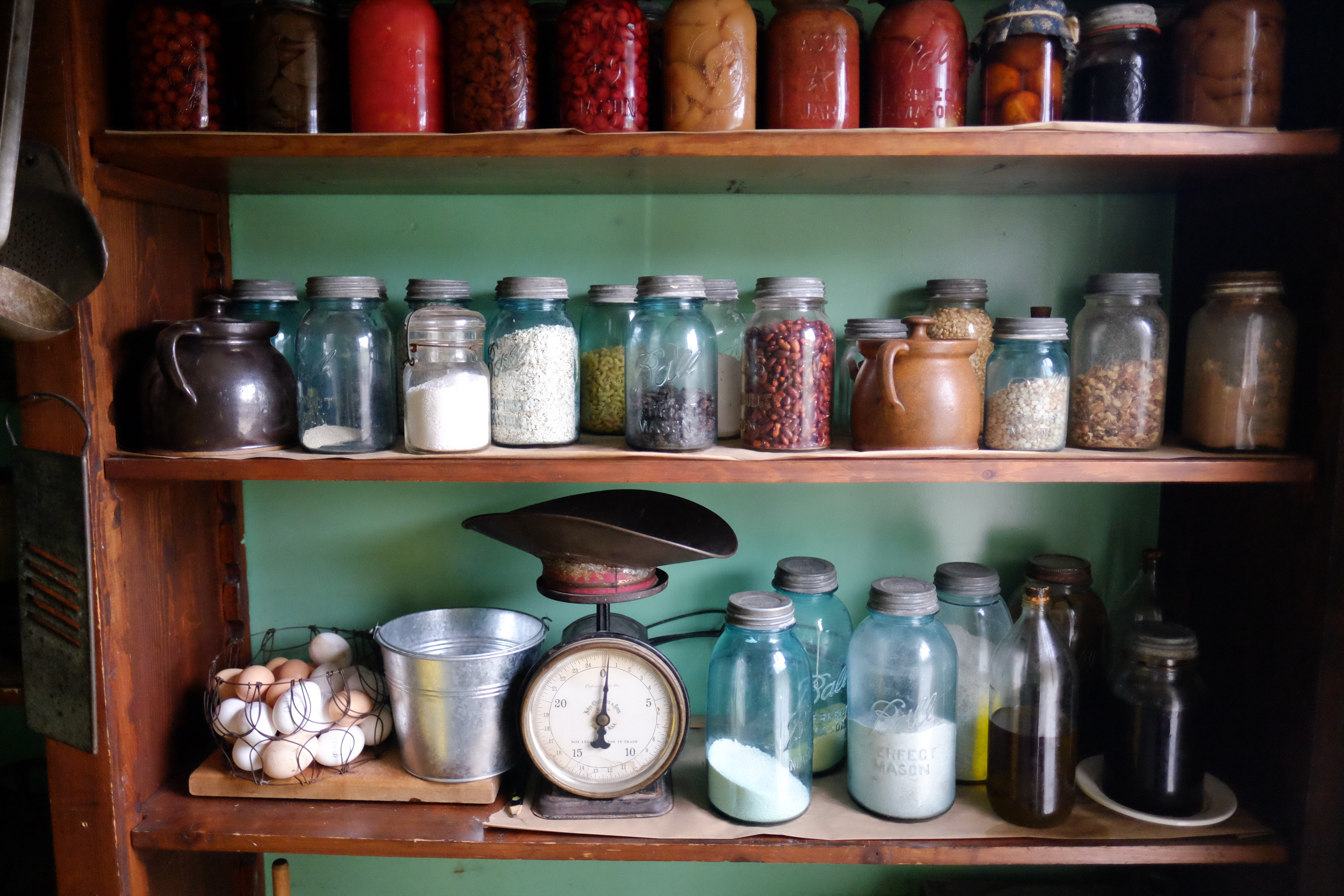
Pantry in house at 1900 Farm

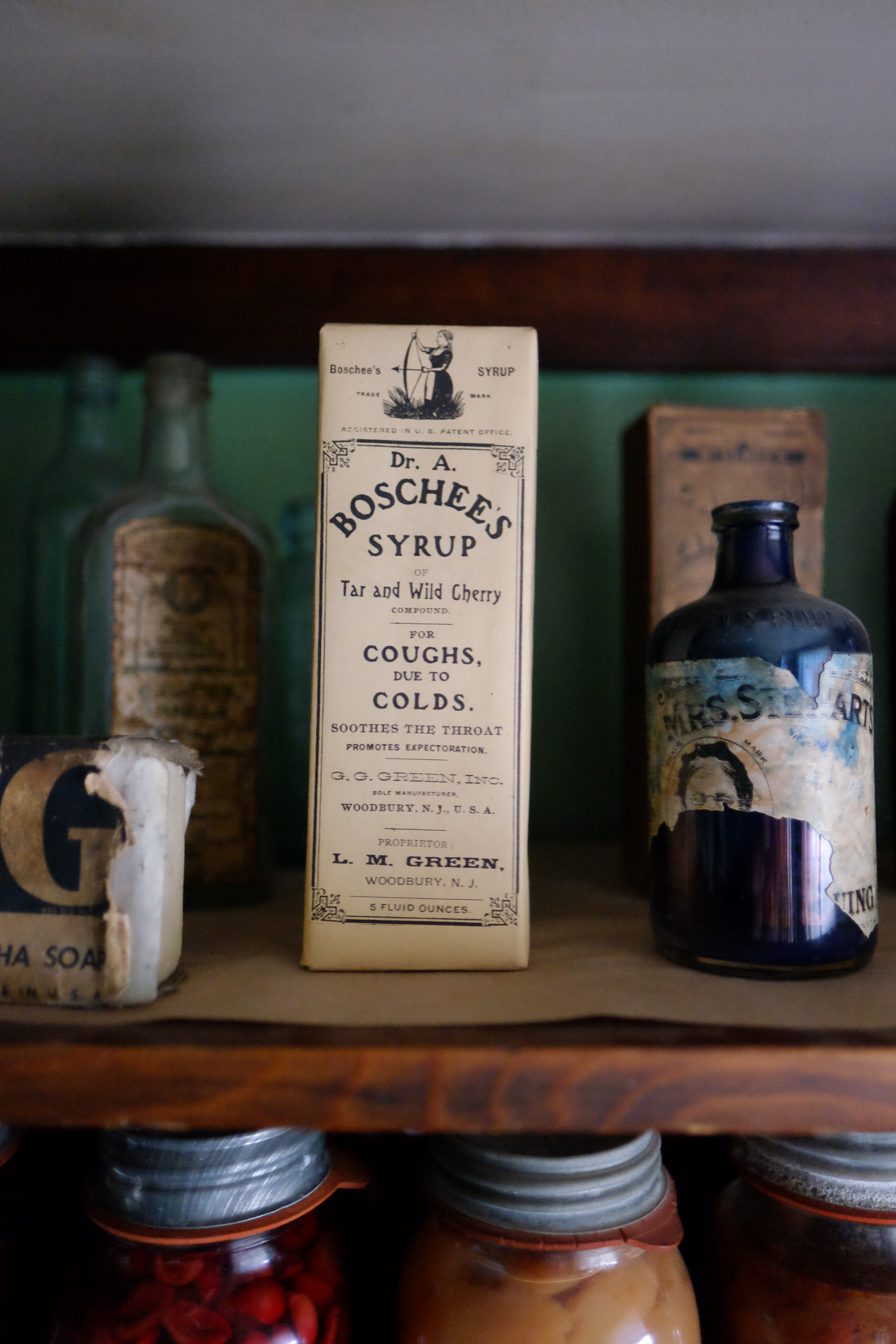
Pantry in house at 1900 Farm
