= Camp Dodge Pool District =

Historic district in Iowa, United States

- U.S. National Register of Historic Places
- U.S. Historic district
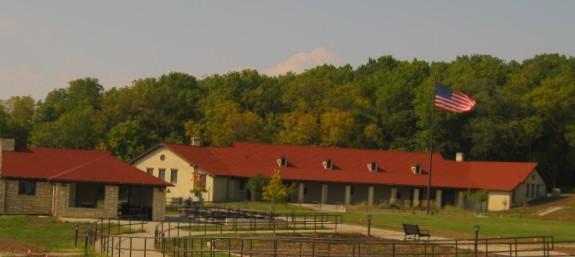

- Location within Iowa Location within the United States
- Location: Buildings A22-A24 at Camp Dodge, Johnston, Iowa
- Coordinates: 41°42′12″N 93°42′35″W
- Area: 5.25 acres (2.12 ha)
- Built: 1922
- Architect: Pearse, Robinson & Sprague; William N. Nielsen
- Architectural style: Late 19th and early 20th Century movements
- NRHP reference No.: 95000098
- Added to NRHP: February 17, 1995

The Camp Dodge Pool District, also known as the Camp Dodge Swimming Pool Complex, is a nationally recognized historic district located in Johnston, Iowa, United States. It was listed on the National Register of Historic Places in 1995. At the time of its nomination it consisted of three resources, which included two contributing buildings and one contributing structure. It consisted of a 2,300,000-US-gallon (8,700,000 L) swimming pool, a bathing pavilion, and a concession stand. The complex was built at Camp Dodge, the headquarters of the Iowa National Guard. When it was completed in 1922, the pool could accommodate between 1,000 and 2,000 people and it may have been the largest in the country. The following year, however, a larger pool was built in San Francisco.

== Construction ==
The swimming pool complex was designed by the architectural firm of Pearse, Robinson & Sprague. The pool was built by Stark and Knotts, and the single-story stuccoed pavilion was built by Sugarman Construction Company. They were completed for $33,102. It was always intended that the pool would be used by the local community outside of the National Guard's annual encampment. It was thought it was inappropriate for the Guard to operate a public pool so the Play Ground Association of Des Moines agreed in 1923 to operate the pool when the Guard was not using it. The concrete block concession stand was built in the 1930s as a Works Project Administration project. It was designed by William N. Nielsen. The significance of the pool complex is based on its association with the value of recreation for both the military and the local community.

== Closure ==
The Camp Dodge Pool closed normally for the season in fall of 2001, and never reopened. It is not fully known why it never reopened, most likely operating costs were getting too high, or the death of a young teenage boy at the pool a few years prior. For 7 years the pool sat empty and abandoned, until the basin was filled in with dirt and turned into an outdoor amphitheater. Many residents expressed their dismay at the decision, as the city no longer had a public option to swim. As of January 2023, the only non-backyard option for swimming is at a nearby private country club.
