= Paul J. and Ida Trier House =

Historic house in Iowa, United States

- Paul J. Trier and Ida House
- U.S. National Register of Historic Places
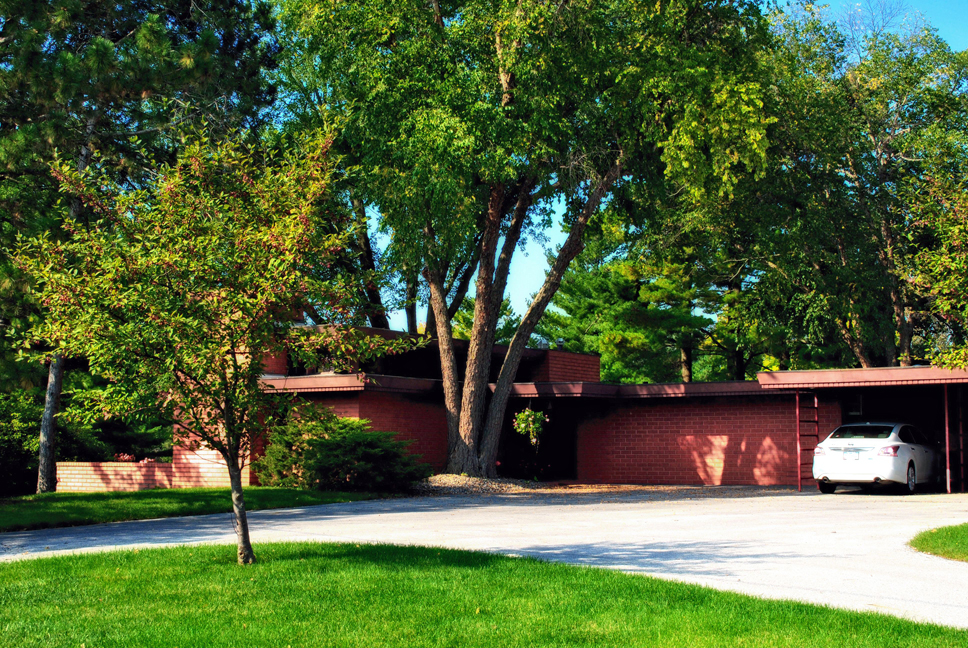

- Location within Iowa Location within the United States
- Location: Johnston, Iowa
- Coordinates: 41°41′9.77″N 93°41′22.95″W
- Area: 2 acres (0.81 ha)
- Built: 1958
- Built by: Paul Smith
- Architect: Frank Lloyd Wright
- Architectural style: Usonian
- NRHP reference No.: 88002148
- Added to NRHP: November 9, 1988

The Paul J. and Ida Trier House is a Usonian home designed by Frank Lloyd Wright in Johnston, Iowa, United States. Constructed in 1958, it was the last of seven Wright Usonians built in Iowa. While it is now located in a residential area, it was originally built on a site surrounded by rural farmland. The Trier house is a variation on the 1953 Exhibition House at the Solomon R. Guggenheim Museum in New York. The north wing of the house was designed by Taliesin Associates and built in 1967. It was originally the carport, which was enclosed for a playroom. The present carport on the front and an extension of the shop was added at the same time.

The exterior of the house is composed of hollow clay tile blocks, while the addition is brick matching the tiles. A low, flat roof caps the home. The interior features red concrete slab floors, with the exception of the kitchen where they are slate. Philippine mahogany is used for the woodwork. A large fireplace is located in the living room. The living room, kitchen, and bedrooms all face south with window walls in the living room and master bedroom. A deep overhang shades the rooms in the summer. The other bedrooms and the study have a band of windows. Typical of a Wright-designed home, the house is integrated into the site and opened to the outdoors.

== See also ==
- List of Frank Lloyd Wright works
- National Register of Historic Places listings in Polk County, Iowa
