= Richard L. and Verda M. Alleman Farm Historic District =

Historic district in Iowa, United States

- U.S. National Register of Historic Places
- U.S. Historic district
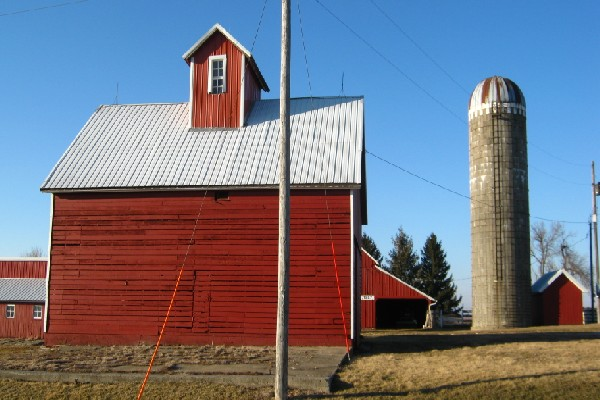

- Location within Iowa Location within the United States
- Location: 2701 NW. 158th Ave.
- Nearest city: Slater, Iowa
- Coordinates: 41°51′0.2″N 93°39′14.2″W
- Area: 157.02 acres (63.54 ha)
- NRHP reference No.: 15000192
- Added to NRHP: May 1, 2015

The Richard L. and Verda M. Alleman Farm Historic District is a nationally recognized historic district located southeast of Slater in rural Polk County, Iowa, United States. It was listed on the National Register of Historic Places in 2013. At the time of its nomination the district consisted of 18 resources, including nine contributing buildings, one contributing site, one contributing structure, one contributing object, three non-contributing buildings, and three non-contributing structures.

The farm at this location has been in the Alleman family since the 1880s making this a true century farm. Its significance is attributed to its being the first stop of a 1955 tour made by Vladimir Matskevich, a representative of Soviet Premier Nikita Khrushchev, and 11 leading Soviet agricultural scientists and managers. During a power struggle that followed the death of Joseph Stalin, the Soviet Union suffered from poor harvests and a shrinking rural population. After Khrushchev publicly complemented American agriculture and criticized Soviet agricultural management, Lauren K. Soth wrote an editorial in The Des Moines Register, "If the Russians Want More Meat...", inviting him to send a delegation to Iowa to see how its farmers worked successfully. Soth assumed Khrushchev would take no such action, however, the Premier took him up on the offer. The Alleman's were contacted on July 7, 1955, by Polk County Extension agent Grover Hahn about the possibility of visiting their farm. The visit took place ten days later on July 17. Soth was awarded the 1956 Pulitzer Prize for Editorial Writing for his editorial. Matskevich returned to visit the Alleman farm again in 1971, this time as the Soviet Union's Minister of Agriculture and Food. The historic district's contributing resources were in place when the 1955 visit took place.
