= Valley Junction Commercial Historic District =

Historic district in Iowa, United States

- Valley Junction Commercial; Historic District
- U.S. National Register of Historic Places
- U.S. Historic district
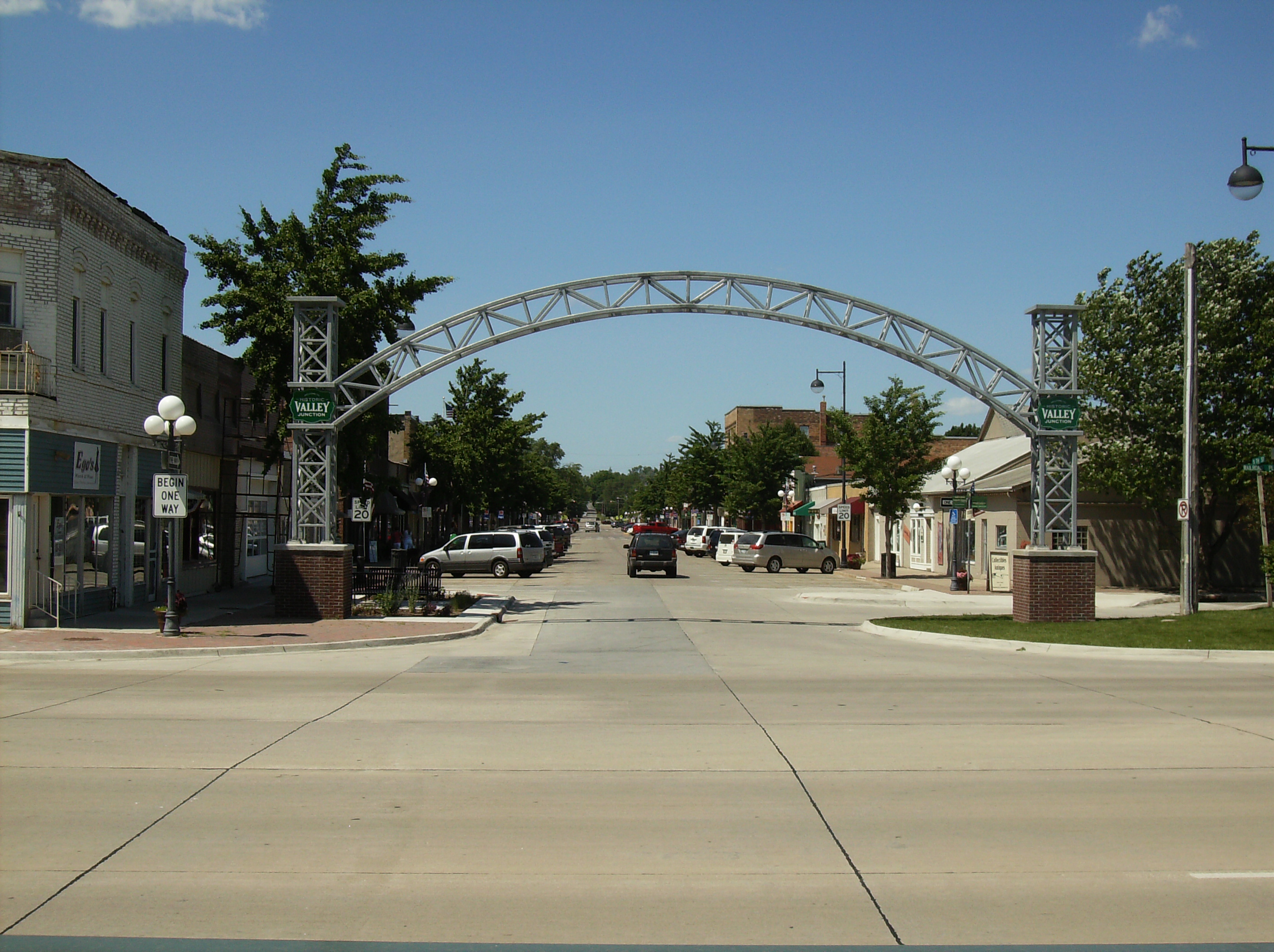

- Location within Iowa Location within the United States
- Location: 100-318 5th St. (even side 300 only) & cross streets, West Des Moines, Iowa
- Coordinates: 41°34′17″N 93°42′32″W
- Area: 11.94 acres (4.83 ha)
- NRHP reference No.: 100001739
- Added to NRHP: October 11, 2017

The Valley Junction Commercial Historic District is a nationally recognized historic district located in West Des Moines, Iowa, United States. It was listed on the National Register of Historic Places in 2017. At the time of its nomination it consisted of 72 resources, which included 53 contributing buildings, 17 non-contributing buildings, and two non-contributing structures. What is now the city of West Des Moines was incorporated as Valley Junction in 1893. Its central business district, which is the subject of this historic district, developed near the depot of the Chicago, Rock Island and Pacific Railroad. The railroad also had their shops (non-extant) to the southwest of the district in an angle formed by the junction. The linear historic district is composed of most of three blocks of Fifth Street and parts of two cross streets.

The buildings are largely one and two stories in height, with one three-story structure. For the most part, the buildings are composed of brick with little to no pressed tin cornices or storefronts of ornamental cast ironwork. Decorative work here features corbelled brick cornices, ornamental blank recessed panels at the parapets, panel and pilaster facade combinations, and a limited but varied range of brick colors. The older buildings (1893–1901) tend to be on the south side of the district. Many of the newer buildings on the north have an inter-war feeling with structures in the Moderne and Art Deco styles. After World War II concrete block construction was more prevalent. The I.O.O.F. Valley Junction Lodge Hall No. 604 (1898) and the Valley Junction-West Des Moines City Hall and Engine House (1901) are individually listed on the National Register of Historic Places.
