= Flynn Farm, Mansion, and Barn =

Historic house in Iowa, United States

- U.S. National Register of Historic Places
- U.S. Historic district
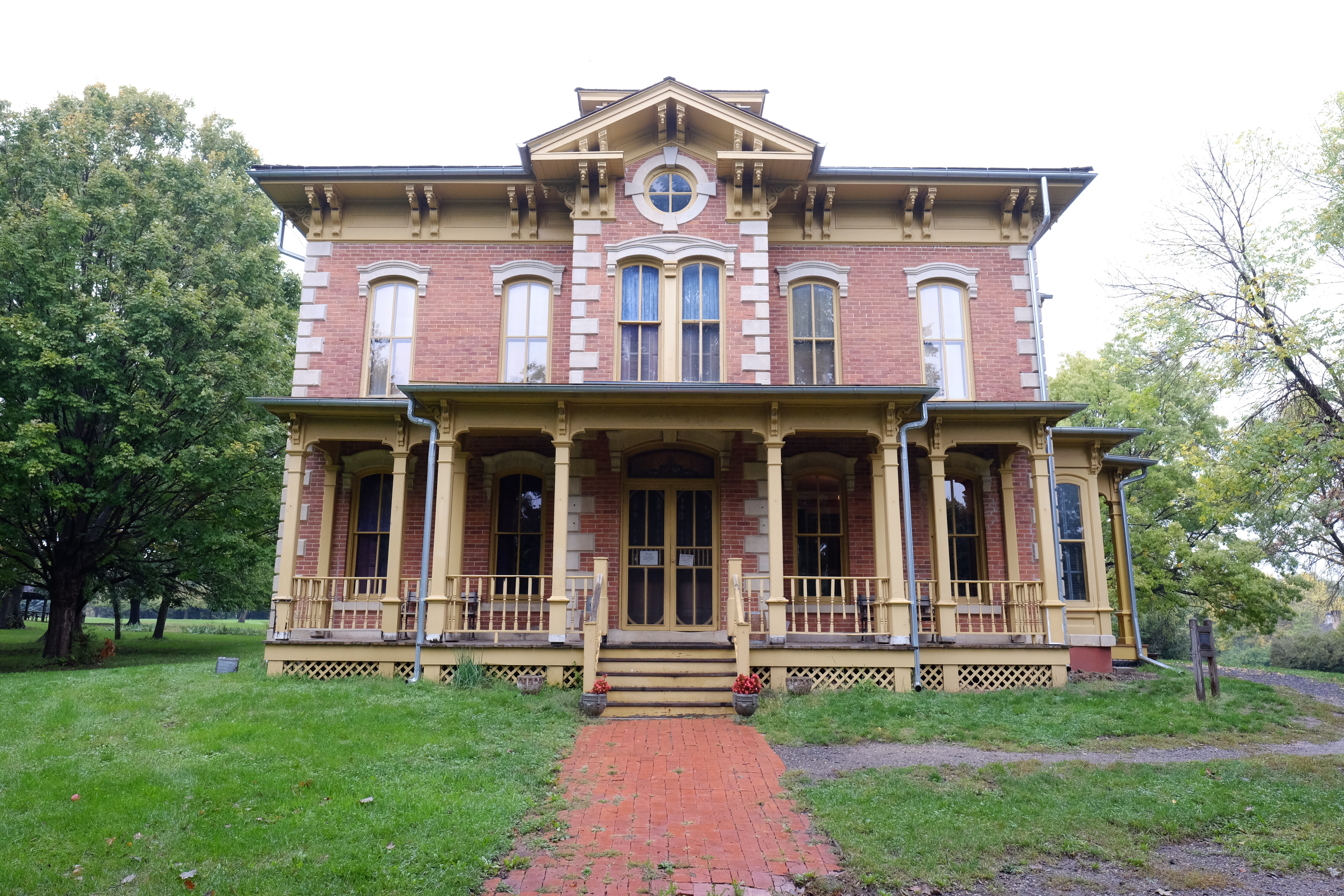

- Location within Iowa Location within the United States
- Location: 2600 111th St. Des Moines, Iowa
- Coordinates: 41°37′18″N 93°46′33″W
- Area: 350 acres (140 ha)
- Built: 1871
- Architectural style: Italianate
- NRHP reference No.: 73000737
- Added to NRHP: November 30, 1973

The Flynn Farm, Mansion, and Barn, also known as the Flynn Farm, Walnut Hill Farm, Clive Honor Farm, comprise a historic district located near Des Moines, Iowa, United States. It was listed on the National Register of Historic Places in 1973.

== Farm ==
The farm was originally 600 acres (240 ha) and grew to be 1,300 acres (530 ha).

The portion of the farm in this historic district has been reduced to 350 acres (140 ha). It includes the original brick farmhouse and barn. Martin Flynn bought the land in 1867. Flynn was a livestock judge, cattle breeder, businessman, and railroad contractor. He was prominent from 1870 to 1906. From 1914 to 1967 the farm was owned by the state of Iowa and was part of the Clive Honor Prison Farm. After that, it became part of an agricultural museum, Living History Farms.

== Flynn Mansion ==
The house was built from 1867 to 1871 in the Italianate style for Martin and Ellen Flynn. They named their home Walnut Hill. The two-story brick house was built for $20,000. It has a hipped roof, cupola, wide bracketed eaves, narrow double-paned windows with hoods, a porch, and heavily molded double doors. Originally, the exterior was not painted. There is a small wing on the back of the house with a side porch and simple roof brackets. A pre-cast cement addition was built onto the rear wing in the 19th century. The mansion sits on top a hill that overlooks the surrounding farmland and a stream.

== Barn ==
The gable-roofed barn that was built by Flynn has board-and-batten siding, a cupola for ventilation, numerous small window openings, and a large main door. The large structure provided shelter, grain and hay storage, and space for equipment for the large number of horses that were needed on the farm.

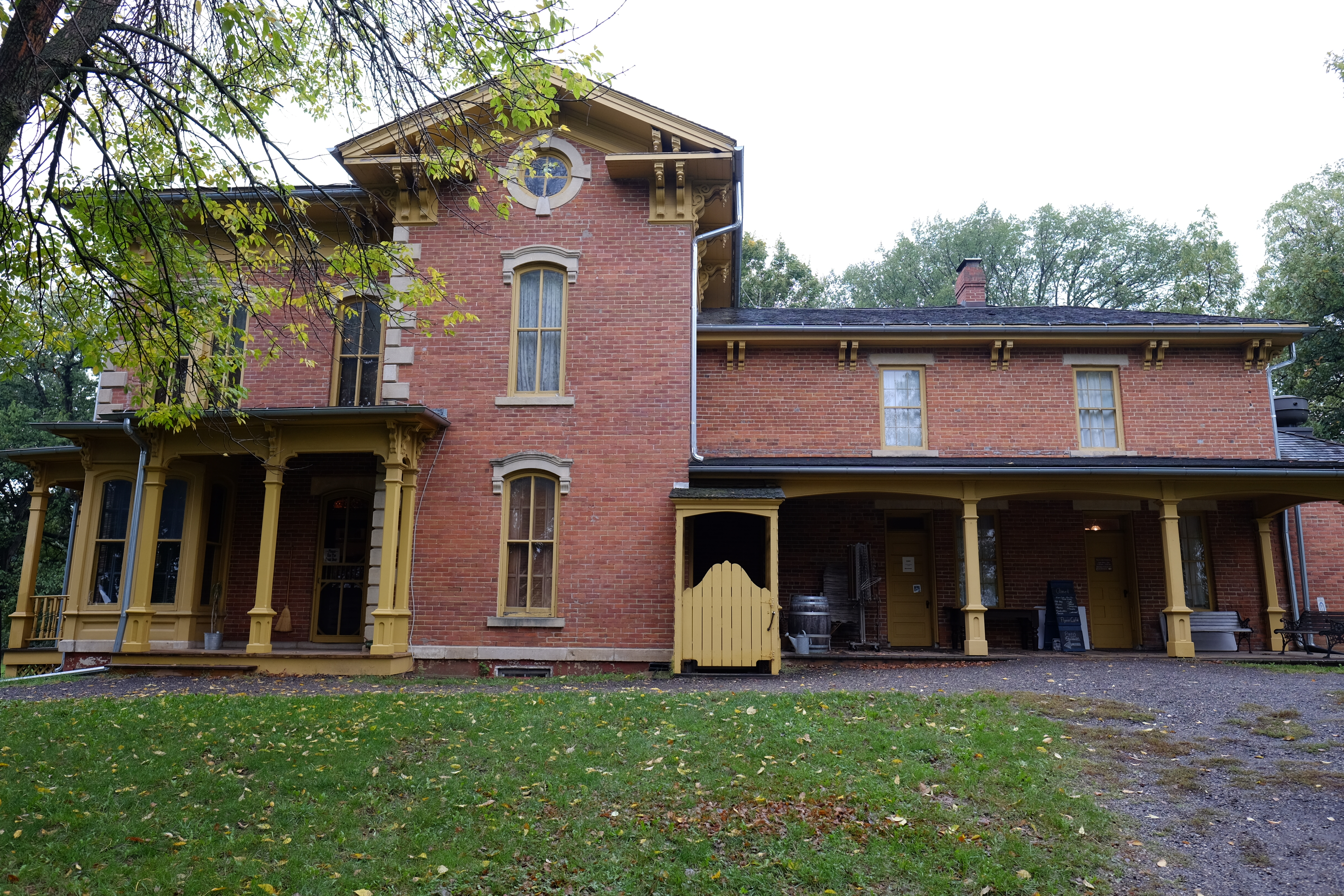
Side of mansion

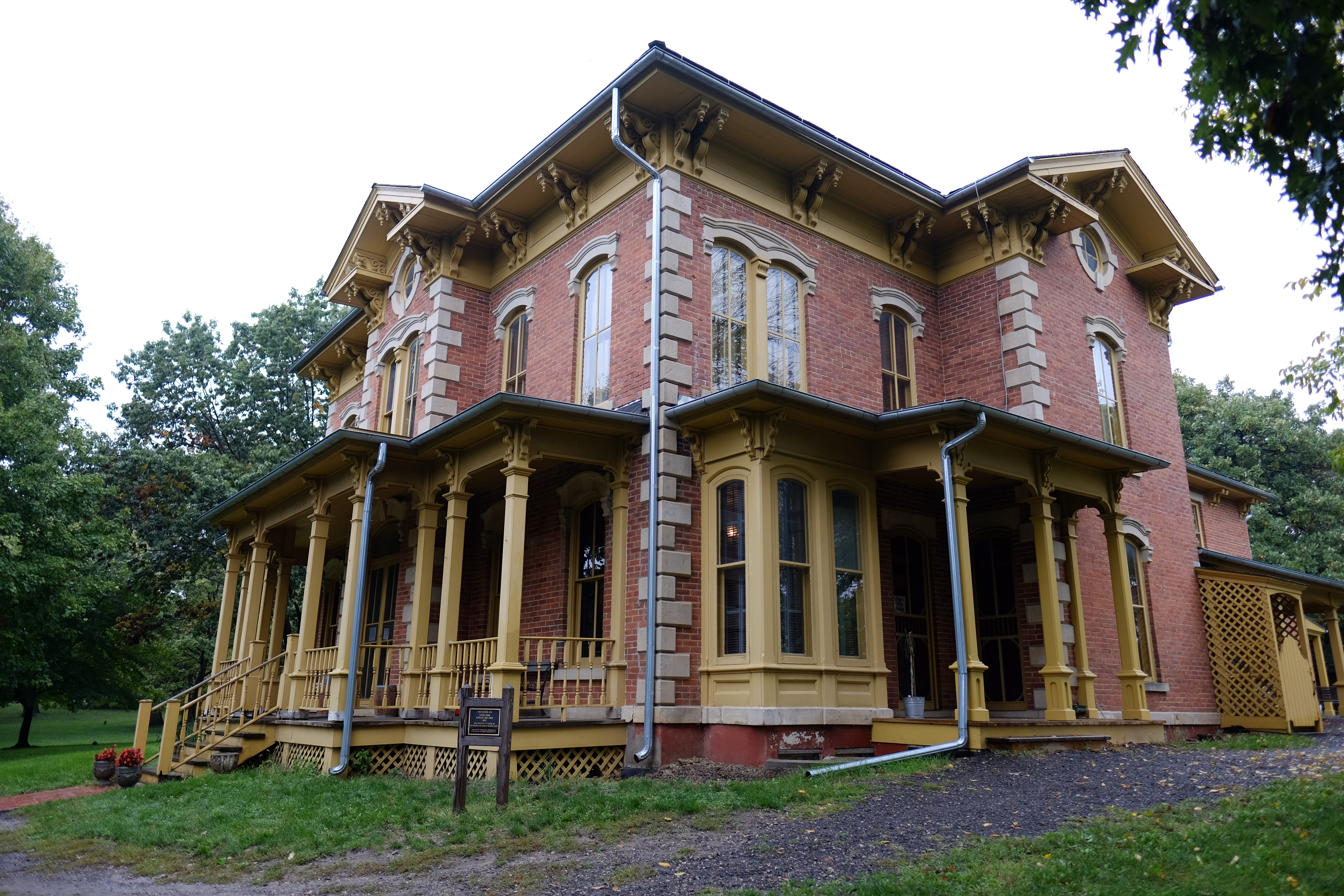
View from corner

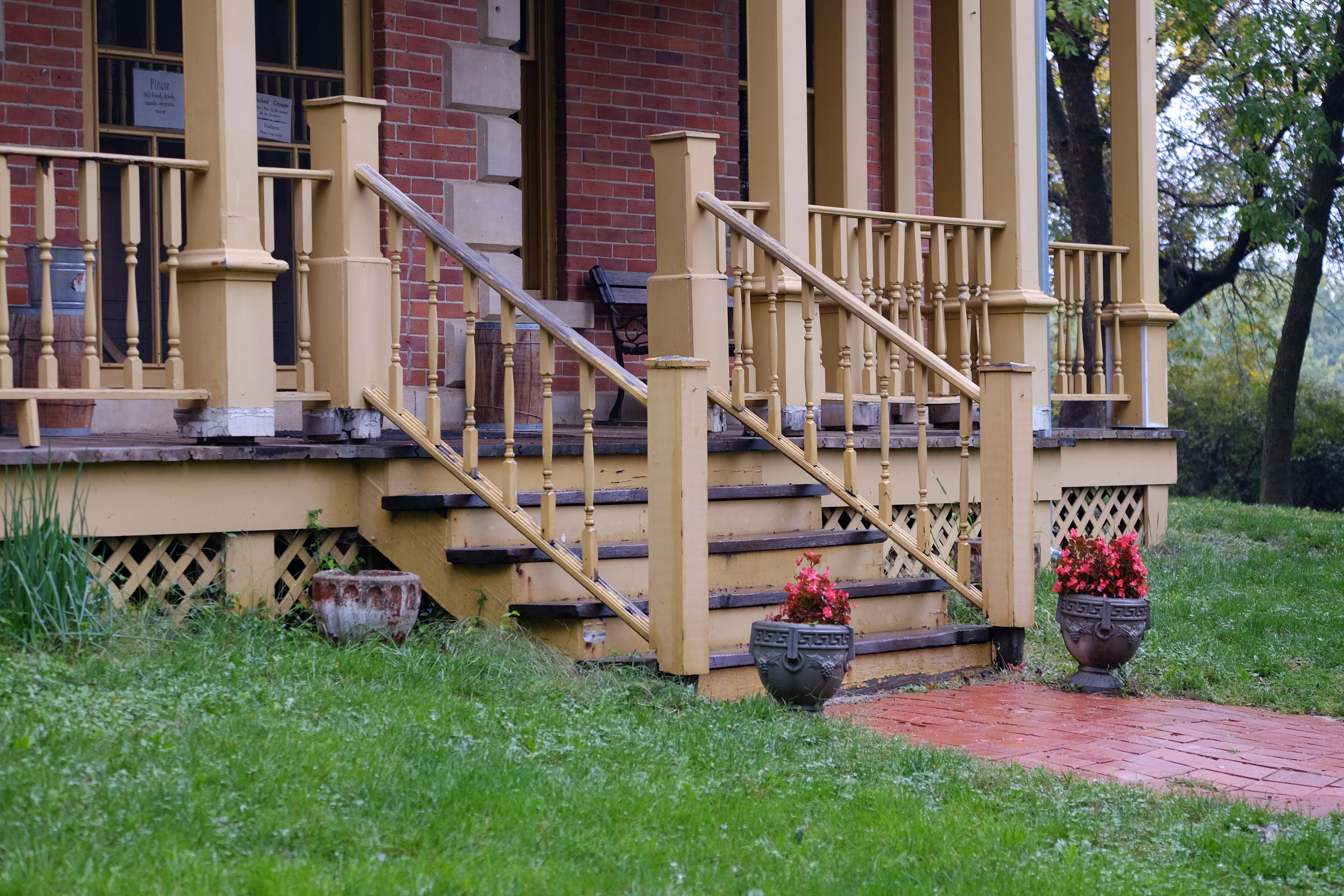
Detail of front stairs

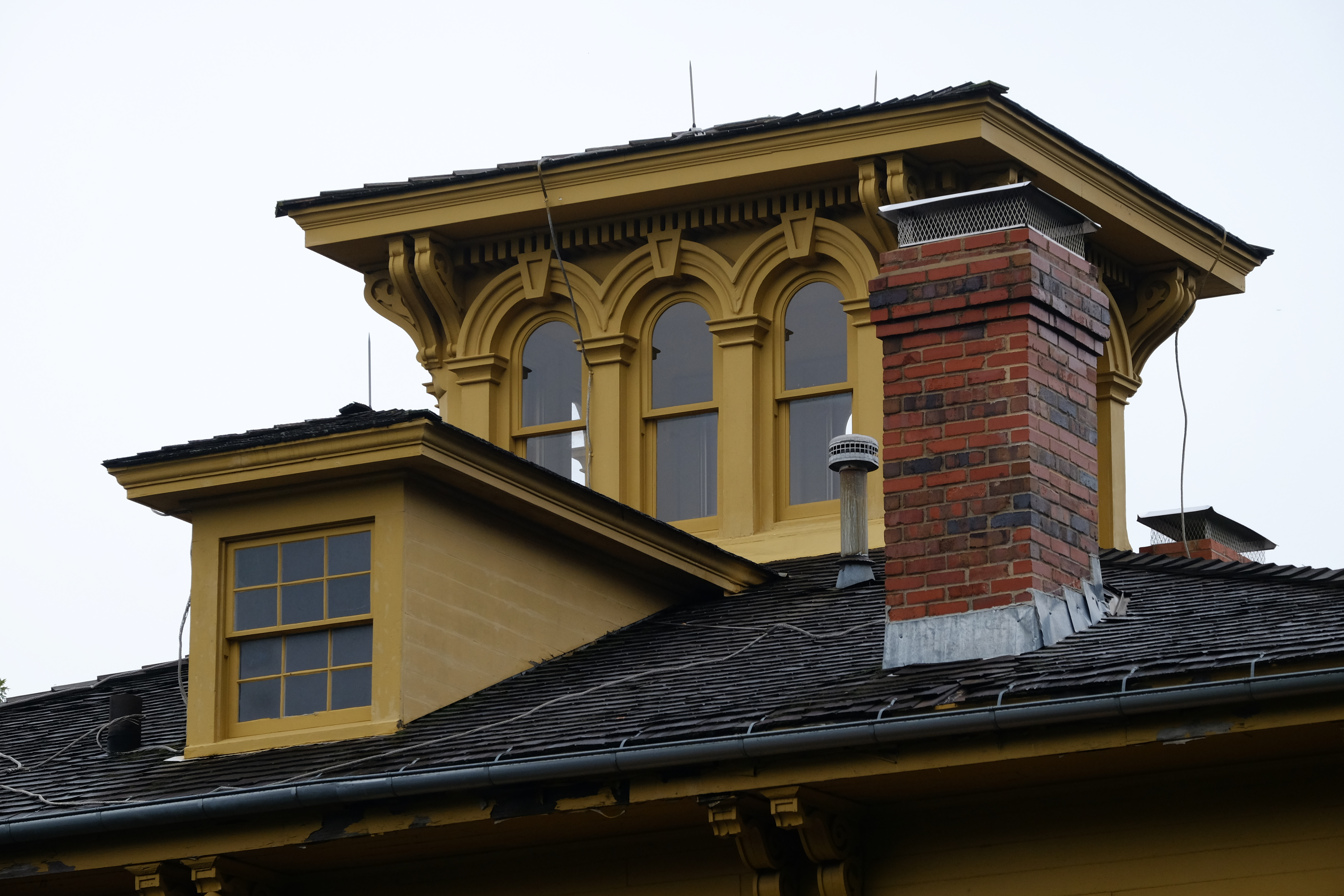
Tower
