= I.O.O.F. Valley Junction Lodge Hall No. 604 =

- I.O.O.F. (International Order of Odd Fellows) Valley Junction Lodge Hall No. 604
- U.S. National Register of Historic Places
- U.S. Historic district – Contributing property
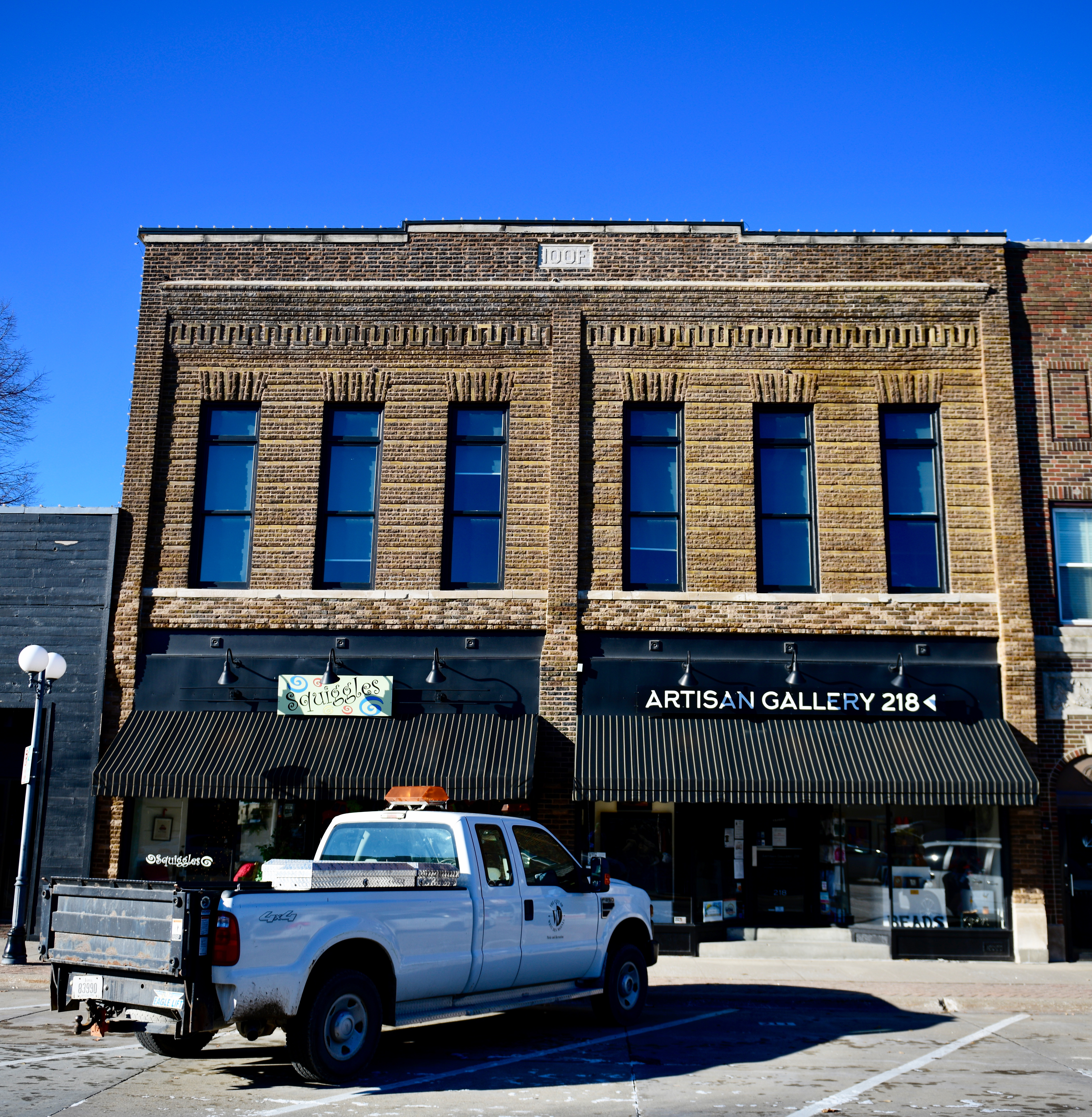

- Location within Iowa Location within the United States
- Location: 216-218 5th St. West Des Moines, Iowa
- Coordinates: 41°34′17.2″N 93°42′32.8″W
- Area: less than one acre
- Built: 1898
- Architect: C.C. Cross
- Architectural style: Italianate
- Part of: Valley Junction Commercial Historic District (ID100001739)
- NRHP reference No.: 100001793
- Added to NRHP: November 8, 2017

The I.O.O.F. Valley Junction Lodge Hall No. 604 is a historic building located in West Des Moines, Iowa, United States. C.S. Yeaton had the two-story brick commercial building constructed from 1897 to 1898. Des Moines architect C.C. Cross was responsible for the design of the Italianate structure. The International Order of Odd Fellows took possession of the building in 1907. A single-story addition was added behind 218 Fifth Street sometime before 1920, and the current storefronts were in place before 1968. The commercial space on the main floor housed a grocer, various hardware stores, and a dry cleaners over the years. The fraternal organization occupied the second floor. The tripartite main facade features two mirror halves. The floor levels in the two storefronts are raised, which is an unusual feature in the surrounding commercial district. The building was individually listed on the National Register of Historic Places in November 2017. The month before it had been included as a contributing property in the Valley Junction Commercial Historic District.
