= Valley Junction-West Des Moines City Hall and Engine House =

- U.S. National Register of Historic Places
- U.S. Historic district – Contributing property
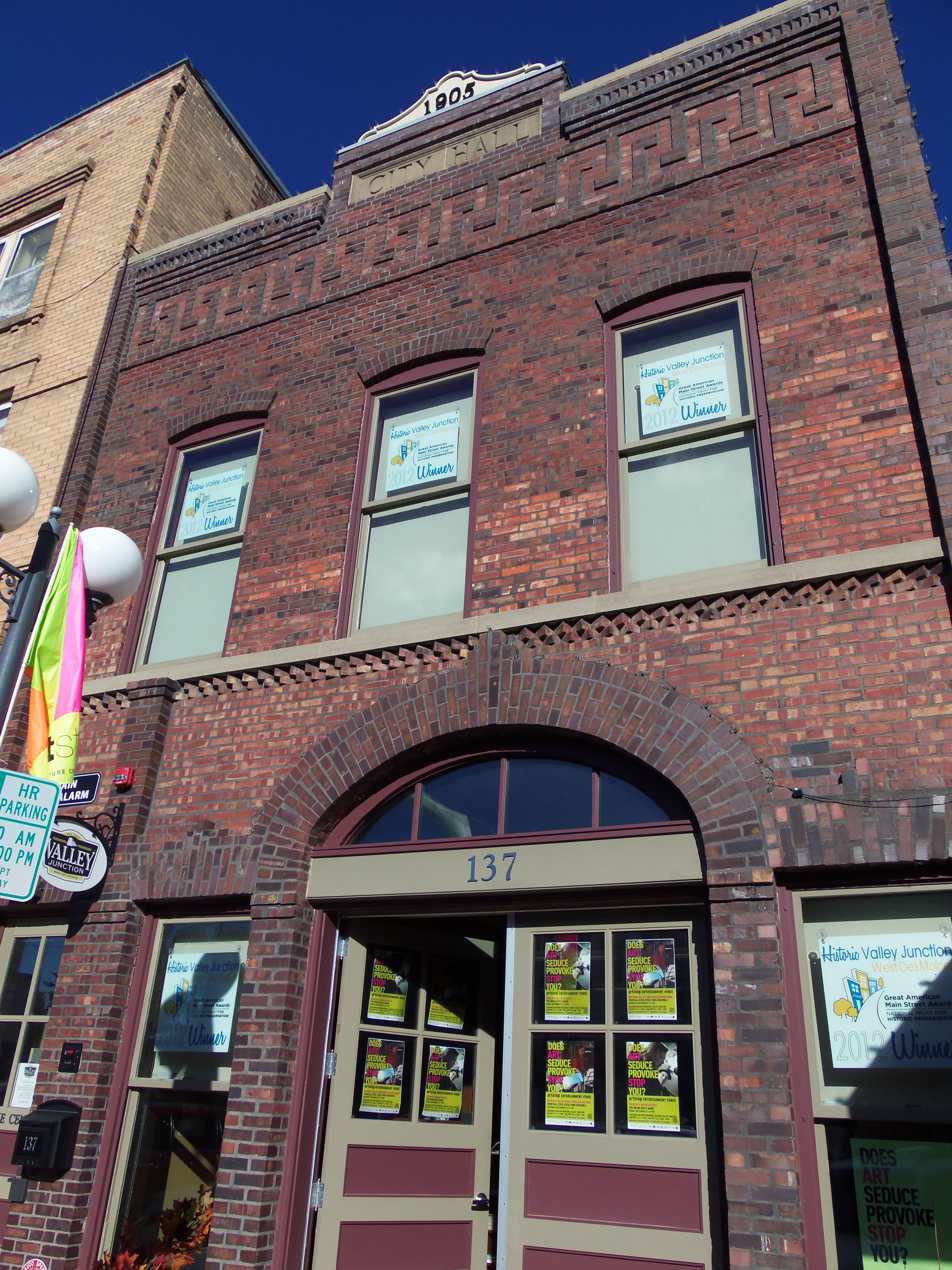

- Location within Iowa Location within the United States
- Location: 137 5th St., West Des Moines, Iowa
- Coordinates: 41°34′15″N 93°42′31.3″W
- Area: less than one acre
- Built: 1901
- Part of: Valley Junction Commercial Historic District (ID100001739)
- NRHP reference No.: 83000400
- Added to NRHP: February 17, 1983

The Valley Junction-West Des Moines City Hall and Engine House is a historic building located in West Des Moines, Iowa, United States. Valley Junction was incorporated in 1893, and it was named for the junction of three lines of the Chicago, Rock Island and Pacific Railroad where it was located. This two-story brick building was constructed to house the community's city hall and fire station, even though the fire department would not be established until 1905. The fire station was located on the first floor, and the city hall was located on the second floor. It was located a block north of the train depot. An interurban railway connected the town to Des Moines, and its proximity to the Iowa coal fields contributed to its growth. By 1911 the town grew to be the second largest community in Polk County, and its name was changed to West Des Moines by 1940. The building was used for city hall until 1952. It was individually listed on the National Register of Historic Places in 1983. It was included as a contributing property in the Valley Junction Commercial Historic District in 2017.
