= Big Creek Schoolhouse =

Historic place in Polk City, Iowa, United States

- U.S. National Register of Historic Places
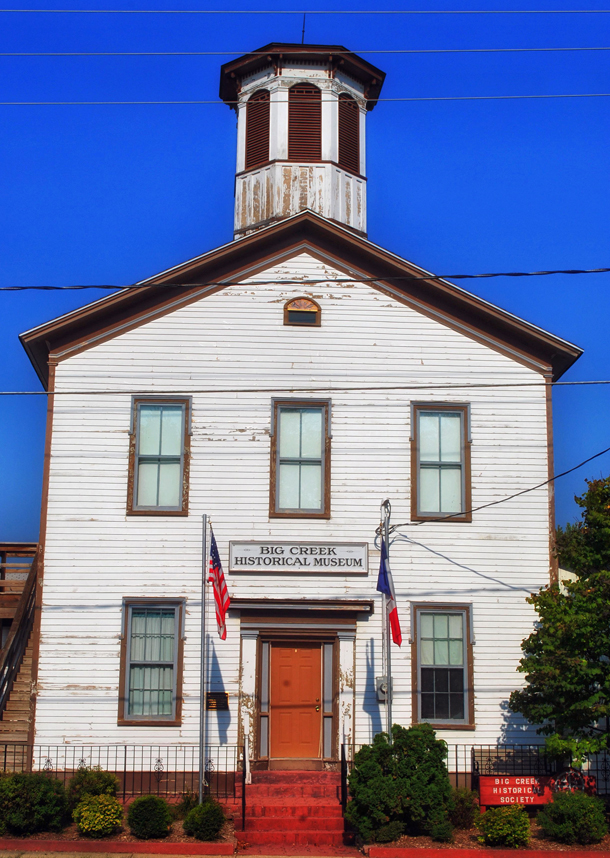

- Location within Iowa Location within the United States
- Location: 112 3rd St. Polk City, Iowa
- Coordinates: 41°46′17.4″N 93°42′52.4″W
- Area: less than one acre
- Built: 1863
- Built by: John Adam Schall
- Architectural style: Greek Revival
- NRHP reference No.: 04000816
- Added to NRHP: August 11, 2004

The Big Creek Schoolhouse, also known as Polk City Schoolhouse and Polk City City Hall, is a historic building located in Polk City, Iowa, United States. It was built in 1863 when the community was known as Big Creek. It is the work of master builder John Adam Schall, who was able to adapt heavy timber framing for the construction of the two-story Greek Revival structure. It served as a schoolhouse and community center from the time it was built until 1893. It became Polk City's city hall the following year, and continued to serve as a community center. A full-size addition was completed on the back of the building in 1915. Two one-story additions were constructed later in the 20th century. A frame addition was built in 1964 on the southwest corner of the main block, and a frame lean-to was added onto the north elevation in 1984. In 1966 the outside staircase, which was the only way to access the second floor, was removed.

Unused portions of the first floor and the whole second floor of the building was leased to the Big Creek Historical Society, which converted the space into a museum. Restoration took place from 2005 to 2009. The rest of the building continues to serve as city hall. It was listed on the National Register of Historic Places in 2004.
