= Johnston, Iowa =

- City
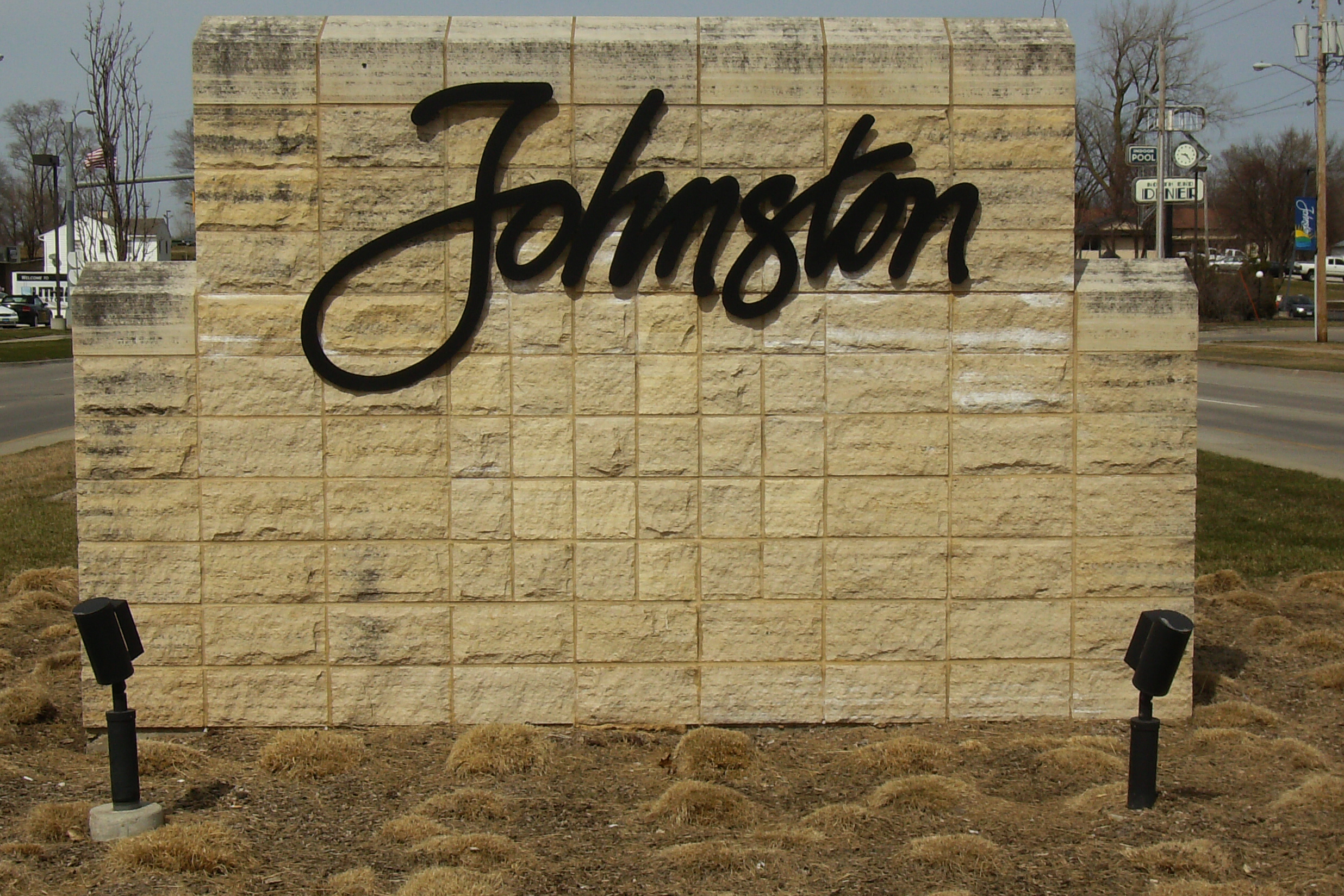
- Johnston welcome sign
- Motto: Thrive. Every Day.
- Location of Johnston, Iowa
- Coordinates: 41°41′28″N 93°43′25″W
- Country: United States
- State: Iowa
- County: Polk
- Townships: Webster, Jefferson
- Incorporated: September 18, 1969

Government
  - Type: Mayor-council government

Area
  - Total: 20.88 sq mi (54.07 km^{2})
  - Land: 19.39 sq mi (50.23 km^{2})
  - Water: 1.48 sq mi (3.84 km^{2})
- Elevation: 824 ft (251 m)

Population (2020)
  - Total: 24,064
  - Rank: 24th in Iowa
  - Density: 1,240.9/sq mi (479.12/km^{2})
- Time zone: UTC-6 (Central (CST))
  - Summer (DST): UTC-5 (CDT)
- ZIP code: 50131
- Area code: 515
- FIPS code: 19-39765
- GNIS feature ID: 2395474
- Website: www.cityofjohnston.com

Johnston is a city in Polk County, Iowa, United States. The population was 24,064 in the 2020 census, a large increase from the 8,649 population in 2000. It is part of the Des Moines metropolitan area.

Johnston is the location of the headquarters of Pioneer Hi-Bred Seeds, Iowa Public Television, and The Gardeners of America/Men's Garden Clubs of America. Also located here are the Camp Dodge Military Reservation as well as the Paul J. and Ida Trier House, a private residence designed by architect Frank Lloyd Wright, and the Des Moines Weather Forecast Office of the National Weather Service.

== History ==
Johnston was established in 1905 as a station on the Des Moines & Central Iowa Railway between Des Moines and Perry known as Johnston Station. It was named for the railway's freight supervisor, John F. Johnston. Passenger service along the railroad ended in 1949, and the track has subsequently been removed within city limits.

Voters passed a resolution to incorporate on June 23, 1969. On September 8, the first Mayor and Council were sworn in. Incorporation papers were signed by the Clerk of the District Court on December 11, 1969.

At the time, the Johnston Station area did not become part of the incorporated city because of a state law that prevented a town within three miles (5 km) of another city from incorporating. The neighboring cities of Des Moines and Urbandale were also interested in that land, but in April 1970, Johnston and Urbandale reached an agreement that allowed Johnston to annex the Johnston Station area.

== Geography ==
According to the United States Census Bureau, the city has a total area of 18.37 square miles (47.58 km^{2}), of which 17.16 square miles (44.44 km^{2}) is land and 1.21 square miles (3.13 km^{2}) is water.

The city is bordered on the east by the Des Moines River and the city's area includes part of Saylorville Reservoir. On the south, the city is bordered by Interstate 80 and to the west, the city limits extend to a half mile east of Iowa Highway 141. The city is bisected by Beaver Creek, which flows southerly through the city until it nearly reaches Interstate 80, at which point the course turn easterly and flows to the Des Moines River.

== Demographics ==
Historical population
Census	Pop.	Note	%±
1970	222		—
1980	2,526		1,037.8%
1990	4,702		86.1%
2000	8,649		83.9%
2010	17,278		99.8%
2020	24,064		39.3%
2025 (est.)	25,065		4.2%
U.S. Decennial Census

=== 2020 census ===
As of the 2020 census, Johnston had a population of 24,064 and 9,194 households, of which 6,328 were families. The population density was 1,240.9 inhabitants per square mile (479.1/km^{2}).

There were 9,896 housing units at an average density of 510.3 per square mile (197.0/km^{2}); 7.1% were vacant. The homeowner vacancy rate was 1.7% and the rental vacancy rate was 9.5%.

Of the 9,194 households, 36.5% had children under the age of 18 living in them, 57.0% were married-couple households, 5.2% were cohabitating couples, 23.9% were households with a female householder and no spouse or partner present, and 13.9% were households with a male householder and no spouse or partner present. About 31.2% of households were non-families, 25.2% were made up of individuals, and 10.3% had someone living alone who was 65 years of age or older.

The median age was 37.0 years; 27.4% of residents were under the age of 18, 6.1% were between 20 and 24, 25.2% were from 25 to 44, 25.1% were from 45 to 64, and 13.8% were 65 years of age or older. For every 100 females there were 93.9 males, and for every 100 females age 18 and over there were 90.3 males age 18 and over.

In 2020, 98.9% of residents lived in urban areas, while 1.1% lived in rural areas.

Racial composition as of the 2020 census
Race	Number	Percent
White	19,651	81.7%
Black or African American	1,411	5.9%
American Indian and Alaska Native	44	0.2%
Asian	1,513	6.3%
Native Hawaiian and Other Pacific Islander	9	0.0%
Some other race	306	1.3%
Two or more races	1,130	4.7%
Hispanic or Latino (of any race)	934	3.9%

=== 2010 census ===
At the 2010 census there were 17,278 people, 6,369 households, and 4,720 families living in the city. The population density was 1,006.9 inhabitants per square mile (388.8/km^{2}). There were 6,618 housing units at an average density of 385.7 per square mile (148.9/km^{2}). The racial makeup of the city was 91.0% White, 2.2% African American, 0.1% Native American, 4.6% Asian, 0.6% from other races, and 1.5% from two or more races. Hispanic or Latino of any race were 2.0%.

Of the 6,369 households 42.2% had children under the age of 18 living with them, 64.4% were married couples living together, 6.8% had a female householder with no husband present, 2.9% had a male householder with no wife present, and 25.9% were non-families. 20.7% of households were one person and 6.9% were one person aged 65 or older. The average household size was 2.67 and the average family size was 3.14.

The median age was 36.9 years. 29.9% of residents were under the age of 18; 5.8% were between the ages of 18 and 24; 28.7% were from 25 to 44; 25.6% were from 45 to 64; and 9.9% were 65 or older. The gender makeup of the city was 49.0% male and 51.0% female.

=== 2000 census ===
At the 2000 census there were 8,649 people, 3,216 households, and 2,318 families living in the city. The population density was 602.8 inhabitants per square mile (232.7/km^{2}). There were 3,406 housing units at an average density of 237.4 per square mile (91.7/km^{2}). The racial makeup of the city was 96.20% White, 0.58% African American, 0.10% Native American, 2.00% Asian, 0.49% from other races, and 0.64% from two or more races. Hispanic or Latino of any race were 1.53%.

Of the 3,216 households 39.5% had children under the age of 18 living with them, 65.1% were married couples living together, 5.1% had a female householder with no husband present, and 27.9% were non-families. 23.3% of households were one person and 9.3% were one person aged 65 or older. The average household size was 2.61 and the average family size was 3.13.

Age spread: 29.7% under the age of 18, 5.2% from 18 to 24, 31.6% from 25 to 44, 22.6% from 45 to 64, and 10.9% 65 or older. The median age was 36 years. For every 100 females, there were 96.6 males. For every 100 females age 18 and over, there were 88.8 males.

The median household income was $76,094 and the median family income was $97,322. Males had a median income of $61,585 versus $36,008 for females. The per capita income for the city was $36,407. About 2.0% of families and 4.1% of the population were below the poverty line, including 2.4% of those under age 18 and 10.8% of those age 65 or over.

== Economy ==
Corteva Agriscience and John Deere Financial are based in Johnston.

== Education ==
The Johnston Community School District serves the city.

== Transportation ==
Transit in the city is provided by Des Moines Area Regional Transit. Routes 5 and 93 provide bus service connecting the city to the region.
