= National Register of Historic Places listings in Tama County, Iowa =

Location of Tama County in Iowa

Tama County, Iowa, United States, has 13 properties listed on the National Register of Historic Places.

Latitude and longitude coordinates are provided for many National Register properties and districts; these locations may be seen together in a map.

This National Park Service list is complete through NPS recent listings posted August 21, 2026.

== Current listings ==
	Name on the Register	Image	Date listed	Location	City or town	Description
1	Chambers Ford Bridge	Chambers Ford Bridge	May 15, 1998 (#98000482)	385th St. over the Iowa River; 41°53′01″N 92°20′09″W	Chelsea	
2	Conant's Cabin and Park	Conant's Cabin and Park	December 14, 2000 (#00000920)	Iowa Highway 96, 3 miles east of Gladbrook; 42°10′37″N 92°39′19″W	Gladbrook	
3	First United Brethren Church	First United Brethren Church	May 8, 2017 (#100000969)	201 E. High St. 41°59′45″N 92°34′36″W	Toledo	
4	Hope Fire Company Engine House	Hope Fire Company Engine House	January 27, 1983 (#83000404)	109 S. Broadway; 41°59′42″N 92°34′40″W	Toledo	
5	King Tower Historic District	King Tower Historic District	March 3, 2020 (#100004998)	1701 E. 5th St. / Business 30; 41°57′51″N 92°33′26″W	Tama	
6	Le Grand Bridge		May 15, 1998 (#98000481)	Abbot Ave. over the Iowa River; 42°01′54″N 92°45′58″W	Le Grand	Extended into Marshall County. Collapsed in 2008.
7	Lincoln Highway Bridge	Lincoln Highway Bridge	March 30, 1978 (#78001263)	E. 5th St. 41°57′52″N 92°33′47″W	Tama	
8	Round Barn, Buckingham Township	Round Barn, Buckingham Township	June 30, 1986 (#86001441)	Off U.S. Route 63; 42°17′01″N 92°28′35″W	Buckingham Township	
9	Star-Clipper-Canfield Building and Winding Stairway	Star-Clipper-Canfield Building and Winding Stairway	October 29, 1975 (#75000699)	534 2nd St. 42°11′36″N 92°27′59″W	Traer	
10	Tama County Courthouse	Tama County Courthouse	July 2, 1981 (#81000269)	State St. 41°59′49″N 92°34′39″W	Toledo	
11	Tama County Jail	Tama County Jail	August 27, 1981 (#81000270)	Broadway and State Sts. 41°59′49″N 92°34′40″W	Toledo	
12	Wieting Theater	Wieting Theater	April 26, 1979 (#79000944)	101 S. Church St. 41°59′45″N 92°34′43″W	Toledo	
13	John W. Young Round Barn		June 30, 1986 (#86001444)	Off U.S. Route 63; 42°11′36″N 92°28′28″W	Traer	

== Former listings ==
	Name on the Register	Image	Date listed	Date removed	Location	City or town	Description
1	Brooks and Moore Bank Building		December 3, 1974 (#74000813)	May 22, 1998	423 2nd St.	Traer	Demolished in 1976.
2	Toledo Bridge		May 15, 1998 (#98000480)	January 8, 2009	Ross St. over Deer Creek; 41°59′32″N 92°35′30″W	Toledo	

== See also ==
- List of National Historic Landmarks in Iowa
- National Register of Historic Places listings in Iowa
- Listings in neighboring counties: Benton, Black Hawk, Grundy, Iowa, Marshall, Poweshiek
