= Young House =

Young House may refer to:

== Places in the United States ==
- W. H. Young House, Arkadelphia, Arkansas
- Col. Young House, Bentonville, Arkansas
- Young House (North Little Rock, Arkansas), once listed on the NRHP in Pulaski County, Arkansas
- William Young House, Rockland, Delaware
- Joseph Wesley Young House, Hollywood, Florida
- Samuel and Ann Young House, Post Falls, Idaho
- Joshua P. Young House, Blue Island, Illinois
- Martin Young House, Chesterton, Indiana
- John Young House (Geetingsville, Indiana)
- John W. Young Round Barn, Traer, Iowa, in Tama County, Iowa
- Alexander Young Cabin, Washington, Iowa
- Young's Ferry House, Bowling Green, Kentucky
- Young House (Nicholasville, Kentucky)
- A.M. Young House, Nicholasville, Kentucky, listed on the NRHP in Jessamine County, Kentucky
- Whitney Young Birthplace and Museum, Simpsonville, Kentucky
- Asa E. Young House, Tracy, Kentucky, listed on the NRHP in Barren County, Kentucky
- James Young House and Inn, West Point, Kentucky, listed on the NRHP in Hardin County, Kentucky
- Daniel Young House, Lubec, Maine
- Young-Sartorius House, Pocomoke City, Maryland
- Belmont Club/John Young House, Fall River, Massachusetts
- Lawrence Andrew Young Cottage, Mackinac Island, Michigan
- Young House (Canton, Mississippi), listed on the NRHP in Madison County, Mississippi
- George Wright Young House, Oxford, Mississippi
- Young-Bradfield House, Vicksburg, Mississippi, listed on the NRHP in Warren County, Mississippi
- W. A. Young House, Salem, Missouri
- Young-Almas House, Havre, Montana
- Benjamin Young House (Stevensville, Montana)
- Gen. Mason J. Young House, Londonderry, New Hampshire
- Brigham J. Young House, Red River, New Mexico, listed on the NRHP in Taos County, New Mexico
- Isaac Young House, Ossining, New York
- Young-Leach Cobblestone Farmhouse and Barn Complex, Torrey, New York
- Carson-Young House, Marion, North Carolina
- Dr. Lawrence Branch Young House, Rolesville, North Carolina
- Thomas F. Young House, Hiram, Ohio, listed on the NRHP in Portage County, Ohio
- Benjamin and Mary Young House, Mentor, Ohio, listed on the NRHP in Lake County, Ohio
- Young-Shaw House, Sarahsville, Ohio
- Capt. Young House, Vermilion, Ohio, listed on the NRHP in Erie County, Ohio
- Colonel Charles Young House, Wilberforce, Ohio, a National Historic Landmark and
- Andrew Young House, Astoria, Oregon
- Benjamin Young House and Carriage House, Astoria, Oregon, listed on the NRHP in Clatsop County, Oregon
- John Quincy Adams and Elizabeth Young House, Cedar Mill, OR
- John Eben Young House, Portland, Oregon
- Robert Young House, Coatesville, Pennsylvania
- Joseph Young House, Newlin Township, Pennsylvania
- Virginia Durant Young House, Fairfax, South Carolina
- Edna and Ernest Young Ranch, Custer, South Dakota, listed on the NRHP in Custer County, South Dakota
- Wilson-Young House, Dellrose, Tennessee
- Stilley-Young House, Jefferson, Texas, listed on the NRHP in Marion County, Texas
- William Friend Young House, Pleasant Grove, Utah
- Brigham Young Winter Home and Office, St. George, Utah
- Reinhart-Young House, Olympia, Washington, listed on the NRHP in Thurston County, Washington
- Fred and Elizabeth Young House, Yakima, Washington, listed on the NRHP in Yakima County, Washington
- Young-Noyes House, Charleston, West Virginia
- John Young House (Muscoda, Wisconsin)

== Publishing house ==
- Young House (imprint), a publishing imprint of Brigham Young University Press in the 1970s

== See also ==
- Benjamin Young House (disambiguation)
- John Young House (disambiguation)
- Young Farm (disambiguation)
