= John Young House =

John Young House may refer to:

- John Young House (Geetingsville, Indiana)
- John W. Young Round Barn, Traer, Iowa
- Belmont Club (Fall River, Massachusetts), also known as the John Young House
- John Quincy Adams Young House, Cedar Mill, Oregon
- John Eben Young House, Portland, Oregon
- John Young House (Muscoda, Wisconsin)

== See also ==
- Young House (disambiguation)
