= Tama County Jail =

- U.S. National Register of Historic Places
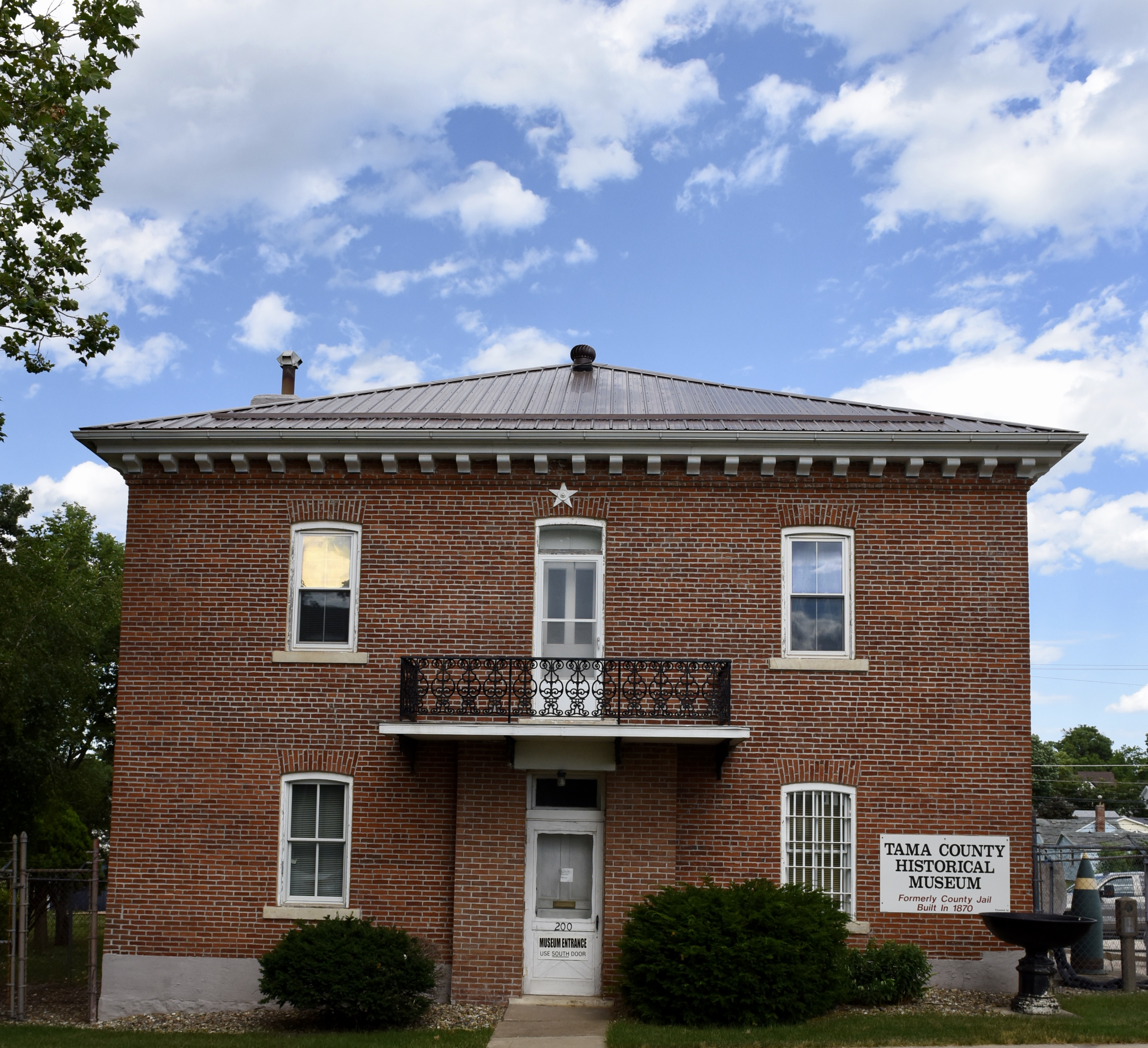

- Location within Iowa Location within the United States
- Location: Broadway and State Sts., Toledo, Iowa
- Coordinates: 41°59′49″N 92°34′40″W
- Area: less than one acre
- Built: 1870
- Built by: David Sterner
- Architectural style: Italianate
- NRHP reference No.: 81000270
- Added to NRHP: August 27, 1981

The former Tama County Jail, now known as the Tama County Historical Museum, is located in Toledo, Iowa, United States. Tama County was established in 1853 but did not have a jail. It sent its convicted criminals to neighboring counties. courthouse was completed in 1865, and discussions turned toward providing a jail. The county Board of Supervisors decided in January 1869 to proceed with plans, and in June 1870 they contracted with Toledo builder David Stoner to design and build the new building. It was completed by the end of the year. The sheriff and his family lived on the second floor and acted as the jailers. A two-story addition was built onto the rear of the building in the late 19th century to provide more space.

By the 1960s the building was inadequate, and was condemned by a grand jury. It closed in 1970, and the county once again started to send its convicted criminals to neighboring counties. The county Historical Society has leased the building to use as a museum.

It was listed on the National Register of Historic Places in 1981.
