= Buckingham, Iowa =

- Unincorporated community
- Location within Iowa
- Coordinates: 42°15′45″N 92°26′52″W
- Country: United States
- State: Iowa
- County: Tama
- Elevation: 899 ft (274 m)
- Time zone: UTC-6 (Central (CST))
  - Summer (DST): UTC-5 (CDT)
- Zip code: 50612
- Area code: 641
- GNIS feature ID: 454939

Buckingham is an unincorporated community located near the intersections of Hwy D-65 and U.S. Highway 63 in Buckingham Township, Tama County, Iowa, United States. It lies 5.5 miles (8.9 km) north of Traer and 11 miles (18 km) south of Hudson.

The postal district covers a large rural community across northern Tama County and southern Black Hawk County including such notable neighborhoods as Hickory Hollow and the old Geneseo school district.

== History ==
Buckingham was named after Buckingham County, Virginia. The former village of Buckingham was once centered on N42 degrees 12.5950 minutes and W92 degrees 28.7428 minutes. At the time of the American Civil War it was the primary center of the local population, prior to the arrival of the railroads in the late 1800s. The original village of Buckingham began to decline after the railroad was built along Wolf Creek, in the valley below. This railroad was built about 1880, with the result that commercial activity and residences sprang up in the nearby Town of Traer, and correspondingly declined in the historical village of Buckingham. The former site of Buckingham remained sparsely populated through the mid-1900s. The population of the historic Buckingham settlement was 75 in 1925. The population was at 50 in 1940.

== Services ==
Buckingham is served by the Traer Fire Department.

== Education ==
Buckingham is part of the North Tama School District.

== Notable people ==
- Joshua Meggers (born 1980), member of the Iowa House of Representatives
