= Buckingham Township =

Buckingham Township may refer to the following townships in the United States:

- Buckingham Township, Tama County, Iowa
- Buckingham Township, Bucks County, Pennsylvania
- Buckingham Township, Wayne County, Pennsylvania
