= Levi and Matilda Stanley =

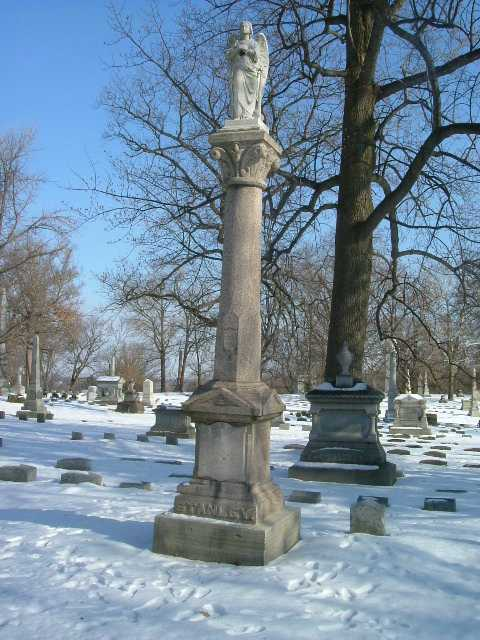
Stanley Family Plot, Woodland Cemetery

Levi Stanley (1818? – 3 December 1908) and Matilda Jowles Stanley (1821? – 15 January 1878) were members of the Stanley family, of Romani heritage. They immigrated from England to Montgomery County, Ohio.

Their family was referred to as "Dayton's own Gypsies," using a term for those of Romani heritage which is now considered offensive in North America. After the death of Levi's parents, the couple were sometimes referred to as "king" and "queen", both within the Romani community and to some gorgers (Angloromani: "non-Romani"). This term was sometimes applied at the time to heads of a Romani extended family group.

== Biography ==
=== Family and migration ===
Levi Stanley was the son of Owen Stanley (1794 – 21 February 1860) and Harriet Worden (1793 – 30 August 1857), who were heads of the family before Levi and his wife. Levi had a brother named Benjamin, who settled down in New England. Benjamin was disowned by his father, and was said to have had a curse put on him and the generations that followed him.

Matilda Jowles was the daughter of Isaac Jowles, "head" of the Romani in Somerset, England. Isaac was married to Merrily Cooper.

Both Matilda and Levi were born in Reading, Berkshire, England, and were said to have arrived in the United States in 1856, "when Buchanan was king” (again, king intended as "head of the Romani"), along with others of their people. A passenger list states that Levi and his brother Benjamin arrived in New York City with their families on 1 July 1854 on a ship named Try that sailed from Glasgow, Scotland. They soon settled near Troy, Ohio but shortly after, they selected Dayton, Ohio as their headquarter for the summer months, and it became a centre for the Romani of the country. Each year as they departed Dayton for warmer climes, their caravans would go in procession down Main Street.

When Levi became old and infirm, his son Levi Jr., called "Sugar" Stanley (1835 – 5 March 1916), succeeded him as head of the Romani.

=== Birth dates ===
In the federal censuses from 1860 to 1900, ages were indicated by various birth years, so their accuracy is in doubt. The dates given above are from Levi's and Matilda's graves. In 1900, Levi claimed he had been born in November 1808; in his obituary, however, his age was given as 96 (implying he was born in 1812).

=== Occupation and personality ===
Defined originally as "wanderers" in later years they gave their occupation as horse traders. In contrast with common perception, they were reverent church people, and Levi and his son were members of the Independent Order of Odd Fellows. After Matilda's death, Levi stated that "our children are all learning fast, and soon our people will not go a-roaming any more." The children of Levi's extended family revealed the extent of their wandering by their birthplaces in the censuses: New York, Illinois, Mississippi, Tennessee, Arkansas, Ohio, Michigan and others.

Matilda was said to have had a wonderful faculty for telling fortunes and remarkable powers as a mesmerist, both qualities being explained by the fact that they were handed down to her because she was the eldest daughter in the Stanley family, and that they were secret abilities possessed by her alone. She was described in the press as a "plain, hardy-looking woman, with a touch of Meg Merrilies in her appearance, and a manner indicative of a strong and pronounced character." Meg Merrilies was a Romani "queen" in the Sir Walter Scott novel, Guy Mannering, made famous on the American stage by Charlotte Cushman.

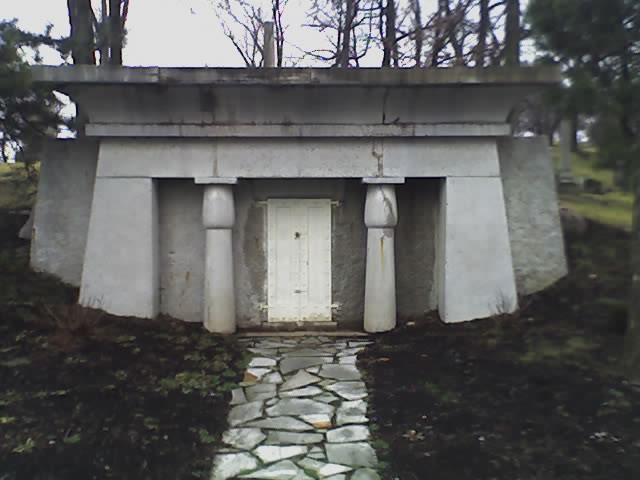
Receiving Vault, Woodland Cemetery

=== Death and legacy ===
Matilda died in Vicksburg, Mississippi in January 1878 after an illness that lasted two years, and her body was embalmed so that it could "retain the natural aspect of life." It was placed in the Woodland receiving vault in Dayton, and every day members of the late ”queen"'s family came with fresh flowers to visit her. Eight months later the funeral was held, in order to give some time for the word to spread and to make it so that more of their people traveled to Dayton. She was interred in the Stanley family plot. Twenty-thousand people paid their last tribute to the dead ”queen", including a dozen chiefs, together with their tribes, coming from different sections of the United States, Canada and England.

Her funeral did not consist of some extraordinary rite as the people expected. Reverende Dr. Daniel Berger, of the United Brethren Church of Dayton, officiated, while the quartet choir of the First United Brethren Church sang hymns. The transfer of the casket from the vault to the family mausoleum was overall a brief ceremony.

Her funeral attracted the major newspapers of the country and was made a front-page news. Four years later, two more children were interred, and the Dayton Democrat reported that the "attendance was quite large, tent-dwellers having come from all parts of the country – from New York to Mississippi – to be present at the funeral." The story was picked up by the New York Times as well.

However, by time that Levi Stanley died in Marshall, Texas thirty years later, the national press did not even mention his passing. In the article about the arrival of his remains in Dayton by train, it was noted that the aggregate wealth of his family consisted in hundreds of thousands of dollars, made equally from horse trading and fortune telling. By then, the family owned substantial tracts of real estate, mainly in the north Dayton area. Following family tradition, the burial was made the following spring, and was attended only by thirty family members from around the country.

More than fifty members of the extended Stanley family (including members of the Harrison, Jeffry, Young, Broadway and Jowles families) are interred in the family plot at Woodland Cemetery, Dayton, Ohio. This means that Woodland has three "kings" and two ”queens" of the Romani buried there.

Levi and Matilda's vault of is a box made of stone slabs, 2 feet deep and 10 by 4 feet in dimension. A 20-foot column surmounted by an angel in white marble stands over the grave.
