= State Training School =

State Training School or variations may refer to:

- Montana State Training School Historic District, listed on the National Register of Historic Places (NRHP)
- State Training School Historic District (Mandan, North Dakota), also NRHP-listed
- State Training School for Girls at Toledo, former school in Toledo, Ohio
