= Hope Fire Company Engine House =

- U.S. National Register of Historic Places
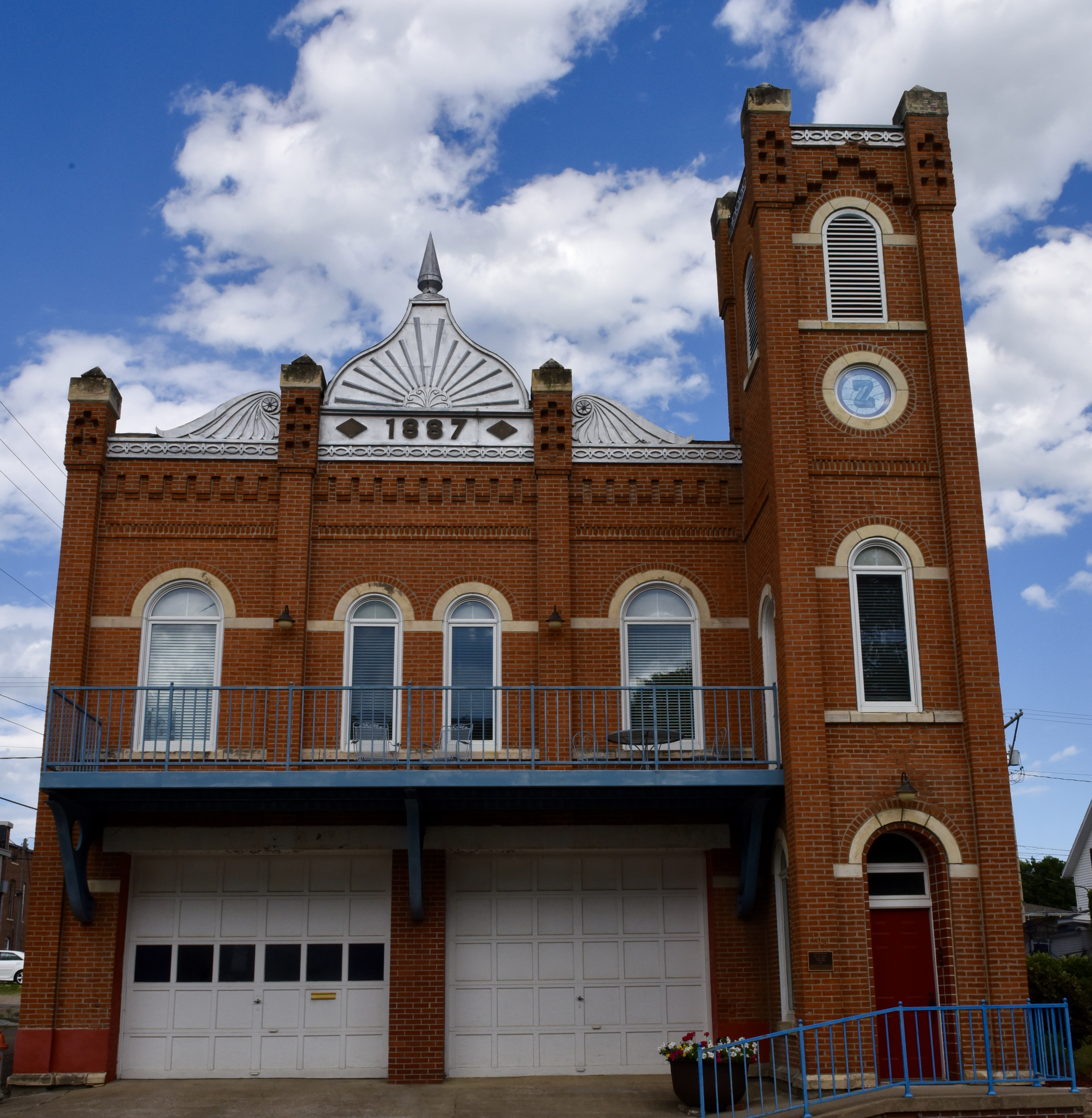

- Location within Iowa Location within the United States
- Location: 109 S. Broadway; Toledo, Iowa
- Coordinates: 41°59′42″N 92°34′40″W
- Area: less than one acre
- Built by: Andrew A. Jones
- Architect: Mr. Gruppe
- Architectural style: Moorish Revival
- NRHP reference No.: 83000404
- Added to NRHP: January 27, 1983

Hope Fire Company Engine House, also known as the Toledo Fire Station, is located in Toledo, Iowa, United States. The Hope Fire Company was established as the volunteer fire company in Toledo in 1876. Prior to moving here they were located in a simple two-story frame structure across the street that was built in 1883. The present two-story brick structure was completed four years later by Andrew A. Jones, a Toledo contractor. It was designed in the Moorish Revival by an unidentified Mr. Gruppe. The firefighters had to raise funds to complete the interior, and it was not finished until 1891. Toledo city hall was located in part of the second floor until 1928. The first floor had to be altered in 1959 to accommodate modern fire fighting equipment. The fire house was listed on the National Register of Historic Places in 1983.

The Moorish architectural style was an unusual choice for a small town in Iowa. Originally, centered double doors with Moorish panels were located in the center of the first floor. They had to be removed because they were inadequate given the larger size of modern fire equipment. The style is still found on the pressed tin pediment with a sunburst motif and the central finial above, as well as the decorative work on the corner tower.
