= Benjamin Young House =

Benjamin Young House may refer to:

- Benjamin Young House (Stevensville, Montana), listed on the NRHP in Montana
- Benjamin and Mary Young House, Mentor, Ohio, listed on the NRHP in Ohio
- Benjamin Young House and Carriage House, Astoria, Oregon, listed on the NRHP in Oregon
