= Young Farm =

Young Farm may refer to:

in the United States

(by state)

- Young-Yentes-Mattern Farm, Huntington, IN, listed on the NRHP in Indiana
- Young, Solomon, Farm-Truman, Harry S., Farm, Grandview, MO, listed on the NRHP in Missouri
- Young-Leach Cobblestone Farmhouse and Barn Complex, Torrey, NY, listed on the NRHP in New York
- Young Farm (Florence, South Carolina), listed on the NRHP in South Carolina
