= W. K. Davidson =

American restaurateur and politician

William Kenneth Davidson (June 30, 1904 – March 4, 1974) was an American restaurateur and Illinois politician.

Davidson was born in Toledo, Iowa and attended Toledo public schools. Davidson went to Bradley University and then worked as a salesman in Illinois and Iowa. In 1931, he started Davidson's Restaurant in Kewanee, Illinois. Davidson was a member of the Illinois Restaurant Association and served as president of the association in 1947. Davidson served on the Kewanee City Council and was a Republican. He served in the Illinois House of Representatives from 1957 to 1965 and from 1967 to 1969. Davidson then served in the Illinois Senate from 1969 to 1973. Davidson died from a heart attack in a hospital in Aransas Pass, Texas, while on vacation with his wife.
