= Perry Township, Tama County, Iowa =

Perry Township, Tama County
- Township
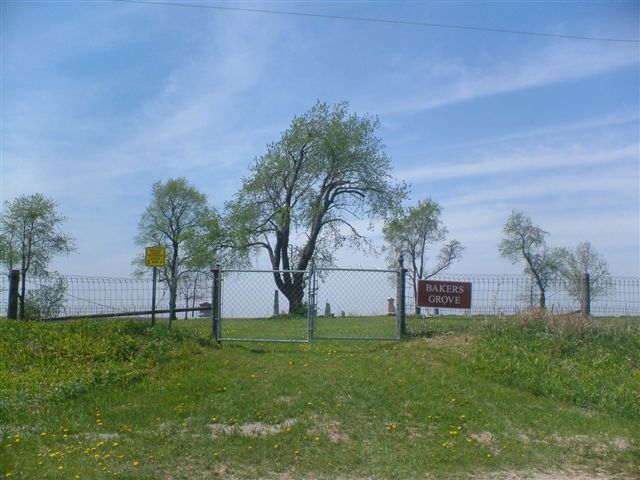
- Bakers Grove Cemetery, May 2007.

- Coordinates: 42°10′01″N 092°28′14″W
- Country: United States
- State: Iowa
- County: Tama

Area
  - Total: 36.10 sq mi (93.51 km^{2})
  - Land: 36.07 sq mi (93.42 km^{2})
  - Water: 0.035 sq mi (0.09 km^{2})
- Elevation: 961 ft (293 m)

Population (2000)
  - Total: 1,891
  - Density: 52/sq mi (20.2/km^{2})
- FIPS code: 19-93306
- GNIS feature ID: 0468510

Perry Township is a civil township in the northeastern part of Tama County, Iowa, United States. As of the 2000 census, its population was 1,891.

== History ==
Perry Township was organized in 1858.

== Transportation ==
Important highways in Perry Township include U.S. Route 63 and Iowa Highway 8.

== Government ==
Perry Township is administered by the Perry Township trustees, who are elected by the citizens of Perry Township and of Traer.

== Geography ==
Within the thirty-six sections of Perry Township are located several creeks — Coon, Fourmile, Salt, and Wolf — and four cemeteries: Bakers Grove, Buckingham, Saint Paul's Catholic and West Union.

The city of Traer is located in Perry Township, as is the unincorporated community of Collins Grove. Outside these communities, the township is rural and its land is primarily used for agriculture.

== Public services ==
Fire protection and ambulance services in Perry Township are the responsibility of Traer.

The ZIP code for Perry Township is 50675.
