= Leander Clark College =

College in Iowa, United States

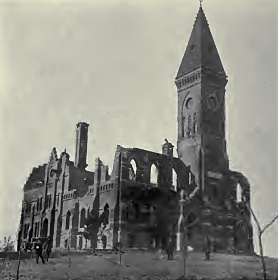
Ruins of the first college building at Toledo, Iowa, after the fire of 1889

Leander Clark College, originally named Western College, was a college in Iowa, United States. It operated from 1857 to 1919, when it was absorbed into Coe College.

== History ==
Western College was established in 1857 by the United Brethren in Christ at a location north of Shueyville in Linn County, Iowa. It was named "Western" because it was the denomination's first college west of the Mississippi River.

In 1881, the college, which was facing financial difficulties, moved to Toledo, Iowa because of a pledge of $20,000 in financial support from that community's residents. Enrollment grew rapidly in Toledo, whose residents' religious values were more compatible with the college's values than had been the case in Linn County. Enrollment grew from 80 students when Western College started operations in Toledo, to 196 students by the end of that school year, and an eventual total of more than 400.

On December 26, 1889, a major fire destroyed much of the college's property, but the facilities were later rebuilt. The campus eventually grew to occupy 16 acres (6.5 ha) in Toledo.

In 1906, Western College changed its name to Leander Clark College in honor of a local benefactor, Major Leander Clark, a United Brethren member who donated $50,000. The college had made an announcement in 1902 promising to change its name in honor of anyone who would donate $50,000 to start an endowment fund to help the school resolve its financial troubles. In 1903, Clark responded to this announcement with a promise to donate that amount if the college could raise an additional $100,000 for its permanent endowment before January 1, 1906. The college met Clark's challenge in 1905, largely because of a $50,000 donation from Andrew Carnegie. In spite of that assistance, the college went bankrupt and merged with Coe College in 1919, bringing a $200,000 endowment to the merger along with its faculty and students. The Leander Clark campus became a state juvenile home.

After the merger, an heir of Leander Clark filed a lawsuit asking for the return of the funds that Clark had provided to the college. The lawsuit asserted that the college had agreed to operate as an educational institution named for Leander Clark, and that it breached its contract with Clark when it ceased to exist under his name. In 1922, the Supreme Court of Iowa decided the case in favor of the college, finding that the primary purpose of Clark's gift was not to perpetuate his name, but to support education.

== Student body ==
Western College was coeducational from its founding. In 1910, Leander Clark College officials told a researcher that the college had enrolled "a number of" African American students, but none had ever graduated.

== Athletics ==
Leander Clark College fielded intercollegiate American football, baseball, and basketball teams. The football team had overall records of 2–6 against Grinnell College and 0–3 against Cornell College.

== Notable alumni ==
- John Ward Studebaker, U.S. Commissioner of Education from 1934 to 1948

== See also ==
- Evangelical United Brethren Church
