= First United Brethren Church (Toledo, Iowa) =

- U.S. National Register of Historic Places
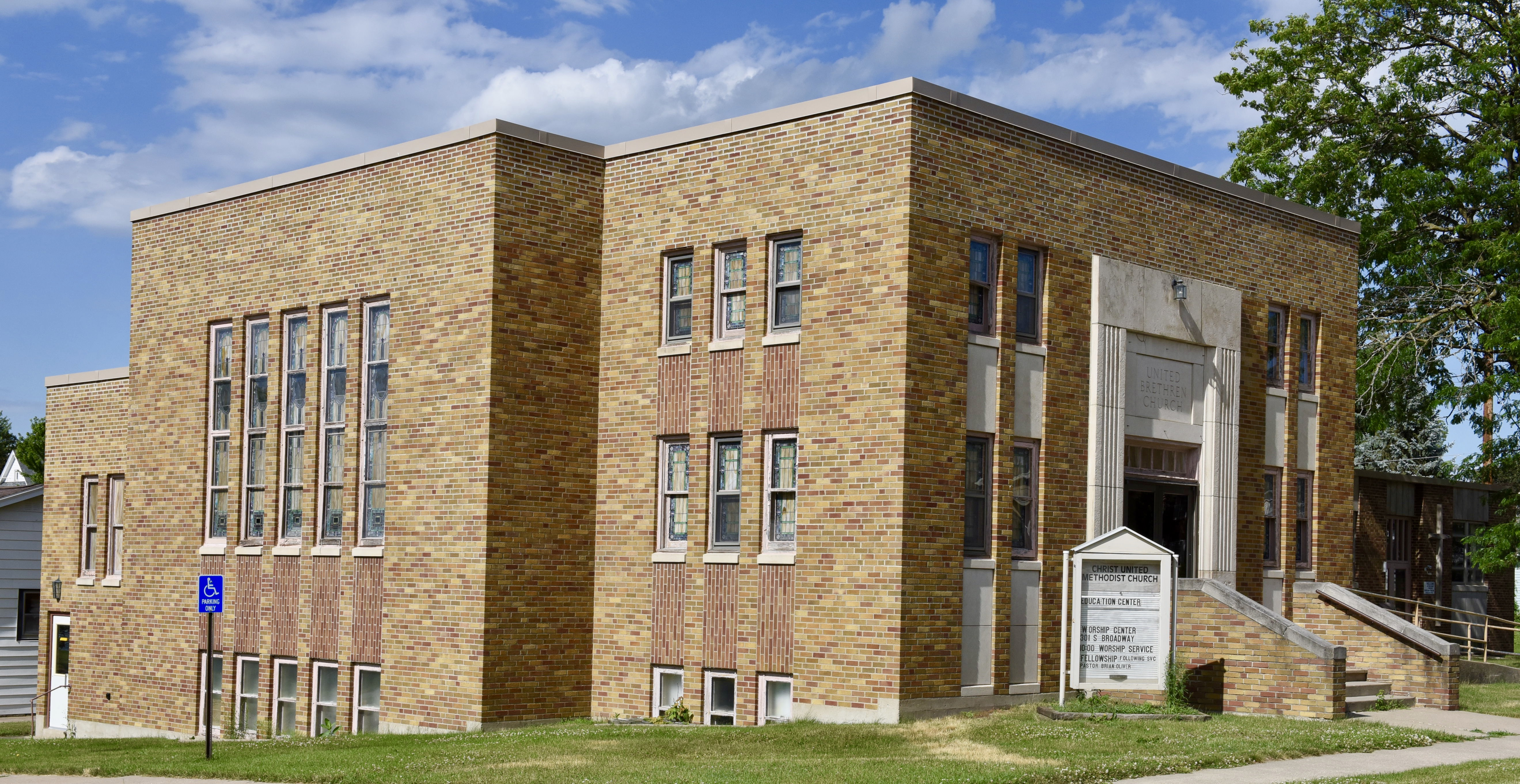

- Location within Iowa Location within the United States
- Location: 201 E. High St. Toledo, Iowa
- Coordinates: 41°59′44.9″N 92°34′35.8″W
- Area: less than one acre
- Built: 1946
- Architectural style: Modern Movement
- NRHP reference No.: 100000969
- Added to NRHP: May 8, 2017

First United Brethren Church, also known as Otterbein Methodist Church, is a historic building located in Toledo, Iowa, United States. Built in 1946, this building replaced an 1886 sanctuary that was destroyed in a fire in 1943. The original church had been associated with Leander Clark College, which had been operated by the Church of the United Brethren in Christ, until its merger with Coe College in 1919. The church became United Methodist after the Evangelical United Brethren Church and Methodist Churches merged in 1968. This congregation and First United Methodist Church in Toledo merged in 1993, and they formed Christ United Methodist Church. The congregation consolidated into the church buildings on South Broadway in August 2015. Hobart Historic Restoration of Cedar Rapids bought this building and plans to converting it into 15 apartments. It was listed on the National Register of Historic Places in 2017.
