= Toledo Bridge =

- Formerly listed on the U.S. National Register of Historic Places
- Location within Iowa Location within the United States
- Location: Ross St. over Deer Creek; Toledo, Iowa
- Coordinates: 41°59′32″N 92°35′30″W
- Area: less than one acre
- Built: 1912
- Built by: Clinton Bridge and Iron Works
- Architectural style: pinned Pratt through truss
- MPS: Highway Bridges of Iowa MPS
- NRHP reference No.: 98000480

Significant dates
- Added to NRHP: May 15, 1998
- Removed from NRHP: January 8, 2009

The Toledo Bridge was located in Toledo, Iowa, United States. It spanned Deer Creek for 124 feet (38 m). The Clinton Bridge and Iron Works of Clinton, Iowa built a single-span, pin-connected Pratt truss in 1912. The following year it became part of the Lincoln Highway route. It was listed on the National Register of Historic Places in 1998. The historic span was replaced by a concrete span in 2006, and removed from the National Register in 2009.
