= Leander Clark =

American politician (1823–1910)

Leander Clark

Leander Clark (July 17, 1823 - December 22, 1910) was an American businessman, Iowa state legislator, Union Army officer during the Civil War, and Indian agent who was the namesake for Leander Clark College.

Clark was born July 17, 1823, in Wakeman, Ohio, where he spent his childhood on his family's farm. He was educated in the public schools and at the Academy of Oberlin College. In 1846, he moved from Ohio to Port Washington, Wisconsin, where he worked as a surveyor, in a drug store owned by an older brother, and as deputy sheriff. In 1849, he undertook an overland journey to California to join the Gold Rush there. In California, he engaged in mining, packing, and trading, principally in the vicinity of Shasta and Yreka. He returned east via sea and the isthmus of Panama in 1852 after accumulating between $3,000 and $4,000.

In 1852, after his sojourn in California, he settled in Tama County, Iowa. In 1855 he became a justice of the peace in Tama County, in 1857 he began a four-year term as county judge, and in 1861 he began a term as the county's representative in the Iowa General Assembly.

After the outbreak of the Civil War in 1862, he resigned his legislative seat to enlist in the 24th Iowa Volunteer Infantry Regiment. He enlisted as a private but was elected captain of his company. He remained in the Army throughout the war, receiving minor wounds at the battles of Champion Hill (Mississippi) and Winchester (Virginia). He was promoted to major in September 1864 and lieutenant colonel in January 1865 and mustered out in August 1865.

Upon returning to civilian life after the war, he served another term in the General Assembly, and in 1866 became Indian agent for the Sac and Fox. In 1882, Clark Township, Iowa, was named in honor of Judge Leander Clark.

Clark became wealthy through the buying and selling of land, first in Iowa and later also in the Dakotas and Missouri. He also served for many years as president of the Toledo Savings Bank in Toledo, the county seat of Tama County where he made his home.

== Support for college ==
In 1902, Western College, located in Toledo, announced that it would rename itself in honor of anyone who would donate $50,000 to start an endowment fund to help the school resolve its financial troubles. The following year, Clark responded to this announcement with a promise to donate that amount if the college could raise an additional $100,000 for its permanent endowment before January 1, 1906. The college met that challenge in 1905, due largely to a $50,000 donation from Andrew Carnegie.

Accordingly, in 1906, Western College changed its name to Leander Clark College in honor of Clark's efforts to help the school achieve financial stability. In spite of that assistance, the college went bankrupt and merged with Coe College in 1919. After the merger, one of Clark's heirs filed a lawsuit asking for return of the funds that Clark had provided to the college. The lawsuit asserted that the college had agreed to operate as an educational institution named for Leander Clark, and that the college breached its contract with Clark when it ceased to exist under his name. In 1922, the Supreme Court of Iowa decided the case in favor of the college, finding that the primary purpose of Clark's gift was not to perpetuate his name, but to support education.
