= Round Barn, Buckingham Township =

- U.S. National Register of Historic Places
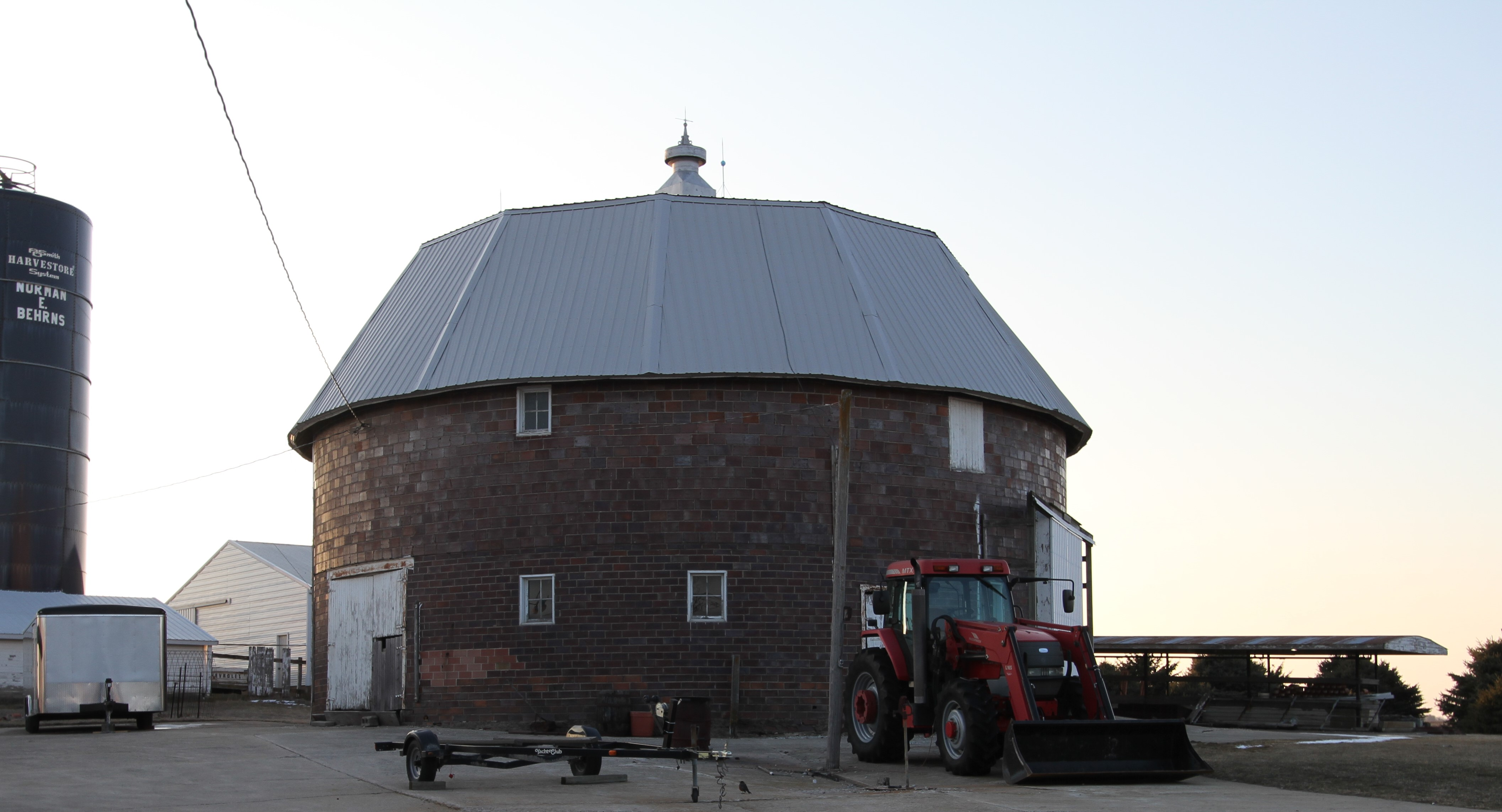

- Location within Iowa Location within the United States
- Location: Off U.S. Route 63, Buckingham Township, Tama County, Iowa
- Coordinates: 42°17′1″N 92°28′35″W
- Area: less than one acre
- Built: 1920
- Built by: John Ames
- MPS: Iowa Round Barns: The Sixty Year Experiment TR
- NRHP reference No.: 86001441
- Added to NRHP: June 30, 1986

The Round Barn, Buckingham Township is an historic building located north of Traer in Tama County, Iowa, United States. It was built in 1920 as a general purpose barn. The building is a true round barn that measures 50 feet (15 m) in diameter. The structure is constructed in clay tile from the Johnston Brothers' Clay Works and features an aerator and a segmented two-pitch roof. It has been listed on the National Register of Historic Places since 1986.
