= Wieting Theater =

- U.S. National Register of Historic Places
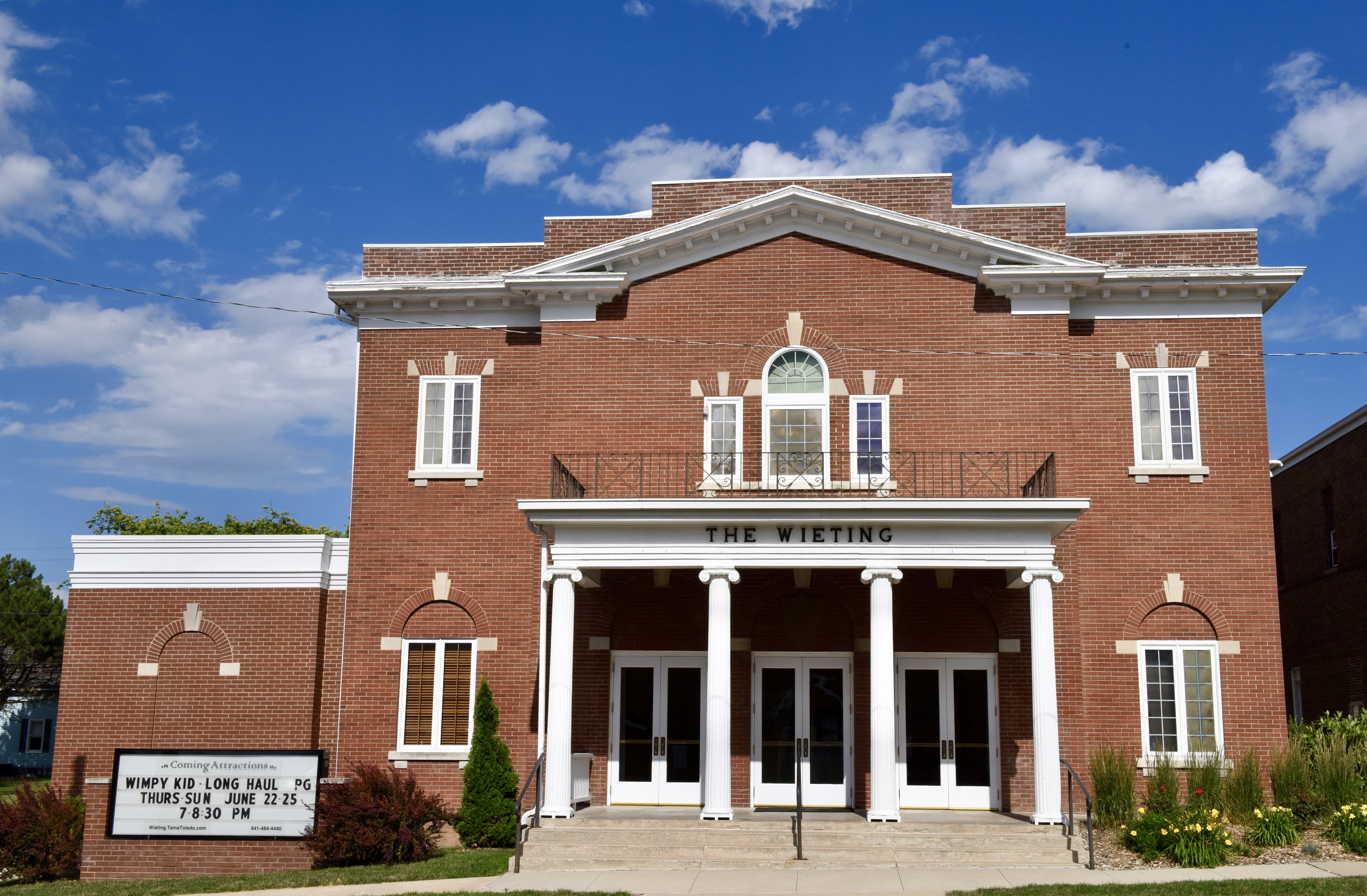

- Location within Iowa Location within the United States
- Location: 101 S. Church St. Toledo, Iowa
- Coordinates: 41°59′44″N 92°34′35″W
- Area: less than one acre
- Built: 1912
- Architectural style: Colonial Revival
- NRHP reference No.: 79000944
- Added to NRHP: April 26, 1979

The Wieting Theater is located in Toledo, Iowa, United States. Ella W. Wieting had three opera houses built as memorials to her husband, C.W. Wieting. The Wietings came to Toledo in 1867 from Worcester, New York. He was trained as a dentist, and was involved in other business ventures. They moved to Syracuse, New York around 1900, and he died there in 1906. She had the opera houses built in the three communities where they lived. The theater in Toledo housed productions from travelling road shows, local school productions, political meetings, movies, and lyceum courses. The theater closed in 1958, and reopened two years later by the Wieting Theatre Guild. It was listed on the National Register of Historic Places in 1979.

Completed in 1912, the two-story brick structure measures 50 by 100 feet (15 by 30 m). The Colonial Revival style facade features a brick parapet, columned porch, and a Palladian window. The interior contains an auditorium, balcony, stage, dressing rooms, and an orchestra pit.
