= Buckingham Township, Tama County, Iowa =

Township in Tama County, Iowa, U.S.

Location of Buckingham Township in Tama County

Buckingham Township is one of the twenty-one townships of Tama County, Iowa, United States.

== History ==
The first European-American to permanently settle in what is now Buckingham Township was Norman L. Osborn, who came in January, 1852, and claimed the southeast quarter of section 26. In 1852 the County Judge of Benton County, Iowa, issued an order for the organization of Tama County into townships. On the first Monday of August, 1852, Judge John C. Vermilya recited the first public record of Tama County, creating the three townships. An informal meeting was held to give names to the townships. The men at the meeting failed to agree on a name, so Miss Margaret Connell named the township "Buckingham", in honor of Governor William A. Buckingham of Norwich, Connecticut.

== Geography ==
The geography of the township is low rolling hills and farmland. The primary farmed crops are corn and soybeans. Twelve-Mile Creek runs west to east through the southern portion of the township. Rock Creek runs south from Black Hawk County through the township, joining Twelve-Mile Creek in Section 23.

== Towns and Villages ==
The original village of Buckingham was established in the southwest corner of Section 33 in 1855, about 1 mile northwest of the present town of Traer. It flourished in that location until about 1873, when most of the businesses began to move to Traer. This townsite is now largely abandoned, with just a few houses remaining. It is still occasionally called "Old Buckingham" locally and that designation shows on at least one historical map.

A new village of Buckingham was established sometime between 1897 and 1909 in section 14 on Rock Creek. It is unincorporated but still exists with an estimated population of about 30 and a large operating grain elevator.

== Other Notable Features ==
A round barn listed on the National Register of Historic Places is in the southeast corner of section 3.

Buckingham Cemetery is the primary cemetery used by the town of Traer, but is actually located in Perry Township at 42.2069337°N 92.4743580°W, just south of the abandoned village of Old Buckingham.
