= William Friend Young House =

Historic house in Utah, United States

- U.S. National Register of Historic Places
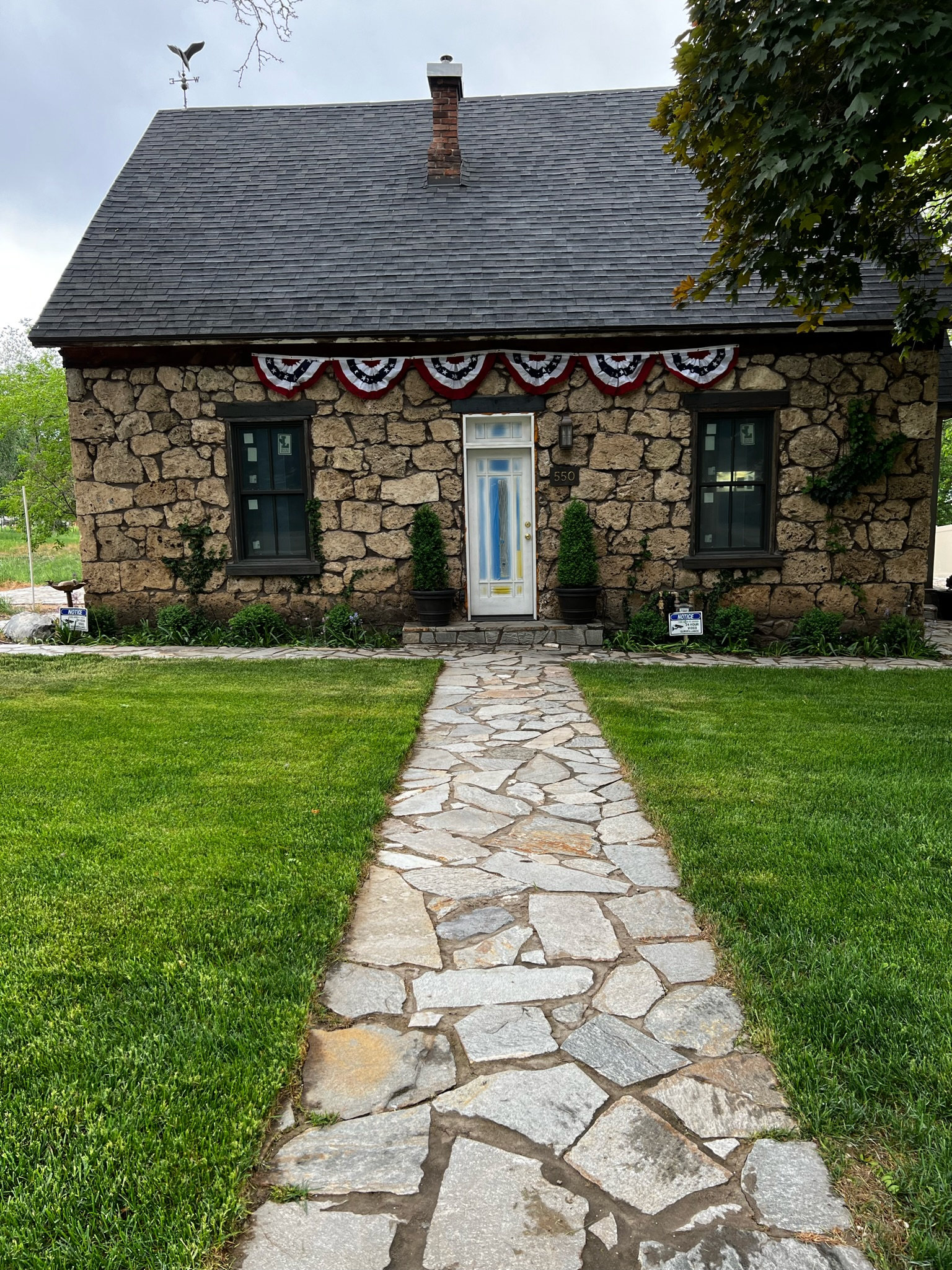

- Location within Utah Location within the United States
- Location: 550 E. Five Hundred N, Pleasant Grove, Utah
- Coordinates: 40°22′8″N 111°43′42″W
- Area: 1.0 acre (0.40 ha)
- Built: 1885
- Built by: Young, William Friend
- MPS: Pleasant Grove Soft-Rock Buildings TR
- NRHP reference No.: 87000834
- Added to NRHP: June 9, 1987

The William Friend Young House at 550 E. Five Hundred N. in Pleasant Grove, Utah, United States, was built during 1885–86. Its exterior walls are soft rock. It was listed on the National Register of Historic Places in 1987.

== Physical Appearance ==
Built in 1885–86, the William F. Young House is a one-story hall-parlor house with a gable roof and soft-rock exterior walls. During the early twentieth century, additions were made to the rear, the house was stuccoed, and other minor alterations were made. The building was renovated in 1986, exposing the soft-rock walls once again and restoring a substantial degree of the building's original integrity.

The Young House is a typical hall-parlor house with a central transomed door flanked by a pair of windows on the facade and two rooms of unequal size on the interior. The house sits on a fieldstone foundation and has plain wooden lintels. There is an unfinished attic that is accessible only from an exterior upper entrance on the east or left side of the house. About 1910, a 19' X 12' brick addition with a stone foundation was added to the back of the house at the southwest corner. It consisted of a kitchen and a pantry. The pantry was converted into a bathroom in 1943. Soon after the brick addition was built, the soft-rock portion of the house was stuccoed and scored to Ph resemble smooth-cut stone, giving the house a more refined appearance. This was a popular technique used on soft-rock buildings in Pleasant Grove at that time. The stuccoed walls were covered by asbestos siding in 1952. A shed-roof frame addition was built on the southeast corner of the house in 1941. It is currently in poor condition. Both the brick and frame additions do not significantly detract from the historic appearance of the house because they are located at the rear of the house and they are relatively small in scale.

A significant interior feature of the house is the 13' X 12'-7" cellar that served as the Young family's original 1884 dugout home. It is located five feet south of the soft-rock portion of the house beneath the 1941 addition on the southeast corner. It consists of a single room with fieldstone walls and a dirt floor. The original pitched roof was removed to accommodate the 1941 addition. The house was substantially renovated in 1985–86.

Both the siding and the stucco were removed from the exterior walls, and the deteriorated mortar joints were repointed. The original front door was replaced and mirror-finish storm windows were added on the outside, leaving the original double-hung windows intact. Most of the woodwork on both the exterior and interior has been retained. Custom-milled baseboard and door casings have replaced some ruined woodwork. The position of the door between the soft-rock and brick addition was changed in 1931, but the integrity of the woodwork has been maintained. A cupboard and hutch that were built into the brick addition remain.

There are several outbuildings on the property, though none of them contribute to the significance of the property. They include a privy and barn, thought to have been built by William F. Young, the original owner, during the late nineteenth or early twentieth centuries. An addition of railroad ties was built on the barn at an unknown date. Other outbuildings include a tie shed (date unknown), a frame chicken coop (1935), and a frame garage-shop (1935). These are all in fair condition.

== Statement of Historical Significance ==
Built in 1885–86, the William Friend Young House is one of the 13 buildings included in the Pleasant Grove Soft-rock Buildings Thematic Resource nomination. Soft-rock buildings are significant because they help document the distinctive regional diversity found in nineteenth-century building stones in Utah. They also represent a distinct phase of the building construction industry in the Pleasant Grove area. Mormon community building in the Great Basin West rested upon the dual principles of order and permanence, and the grid-iron town plan and the use of stone as an early building material have become important symbols of Mormon settlement values. A great variety of local stones were used throughout the state, and the soft and easily worked tufa stone, popular in Pleasant Grove between about 1865 to 1900, remains one of the most distinctive. About 130 soft-rock buildings were known to have once stood in Pleasant Grove, yet there are only 13 well preserved examples today. Most of the earlier buildings in the community, constructed during the 1850s and '60s, were made of adobe, which was easily made and worked. As fired brick became more available and fashionable during the late nineteenth and early twentieth centuries, it replaced soft-rock as the dominant local building material. The remaining soft-rock buildings are important examples of a local architectural tradition and contribute to an understanding of the regional diversity of Utah's early architectural history.

William Friend Young was born May 4, 1860, in Warren, Ohio, and immigrated to Pleasant Grove in 1871 with his parents. There he met Christina Williamson. Christina had emigrated from Hjorring, Denmark, with her parents, William Christian and Christena Hellensen Williamson. Christina, born March 22, 1862, crossed the plains at age three and was raised in Pleasant Grove. William Young and Christina were married December 27, 1879, and in June 1880 moved to Spanish Fork. In 1884 they moved back to Pleasant Grove, where they intended to establish a permanent home.

Soon after their arrival, William obtained an acre of land and prepared temporary living quarters by excavating an underground room, rocking up the walls, and covering it with a low roof of willows and sod. This was not an unfamiliar type of housing to Christina. Her father had provided a similar dugout home south of the Pleasant Grove cemetery when she was a child in 1866.

By 1886, William Friend Young had built a two-room, soft-rock house about five feet north of the dugout. William, a stone and brick mason by trade, laid the fieldstone foundation and 24-inch-thick soft-rock house walls. He probably also built the brick addition on the rear c. 1910. Soon after that, he reportedly stuccoed the soft-rock portion of the house because he did not like the contrast between the new brick section and the original soft-rock house.

Between 1887 and 1901 six more children were born to William and Christina. They were all born in this house according to Marjorie Wax, a granddaughter. The household was enlarged when Young's bachelor brother, Peter, who had lost a leg in a logging accident, moved in.

William Friend Young followed the stonemason trade all of his life, specializing in walls, wells, cisterns, and cesspools. He died of a heart attack October 27, 1921, after working all day laying a wall. Christina, who had become an arthritic invalid, was cared for at home by her son, J. Vern, and his wife, Angeline, who had been living in the house since their marriage in 1918. After Christina's death in 1937, Vern assumed ownership of the house.

Vern and Angeline shared the house with his sister and her four children, who, abandoned by her husband, moved in with them in 1941. The frame addition over the dugout at the rear was built at that time to accommodate them. Vern worked for the Union Pacific Railroad from the time he was 15 until his retirement in 1954. He died in 1972. Angeline survived him and moved to Provo in 1979 with their daughter, Marjorie Wax, who was born and raised in the house as one of three sisters. The Young family sold the home in 1985.
