= Iowa Juvenile Home =

Former juvenile prison in Iowa, United States

Coordinates: 41.9898°N 92.5769°W

The Iowa Juvenile Home/Girls State Training School (IJH/GSTS) was a correctional facility for juveniles located in Toledo, Iowa. A part of the Iowa Department of Human Services, it held girls who were adjudicated as delinquents and youth of all genders who were adjudicated as needing assistance. The former campus has 27 acres (11 ha) of space.

== History ==
The IJH first opened as an Iowa facility for children in 1920. Several Bible colleges used the site before the state government bought it that year; it served as an orphanage and then as a home for children. The delinquent girls served by IJH were of the ages 12–18. Those adjudicated as in need of assistance (CINA) were under 18. The IJH had capacity for 45 girls and 12 boys, with an overall capacity of 57.

Unlike the Iowa Training School for Boys in Eldora, Iowa Juvenile Home was established as a treatment facility, and therefore not secured nor locked. As of 2013 the facility, with $10 million in annual funding, was one of the largest employers in Tama County.

=== Des Moines Register reports, abuse accusations, and task force ===
Prior to the campus's closure The Des Moines Register had run a series about the problems at the facility. In 2013 the office of the Attorney General of Iowa attempted to redact information regarding abuse at this facility from a report. The Des Moines Register discovered the information after pasting the report in Microsoft Word. The accusations involve restraining methods of girls that were unlawful and isolation of the girls in long-term cells. For a 17-year period persons at the facility confined girls in isolation cells for periods of weeks or months, in violation of state law. There were also complaints about poor educational services offered at the IJH.

In August 2013 Governor of Iowa Terry Branstad appointed the Iowa Juvenile Home Protection Task Force to determine the future of the facility. Charles Palmer, the director of the DHS, was a member of this commission. The chair of this committee was Jerry Foxhoven, a Drake University professor of law.

In 2014 former inmate Jessica Turner filed a lawsuit against the State of Iowa, stating that she was held in isolation for 280 days of her 528-day confinement which began in 2011.

=== Closure ===
On Monday December 9, 2013, Branstad announced that the facility would close by January 16, 2014. At the time the center employed 93 people to oversee 21 girls. All residents were to be moved out, and all employees were to be laid off; layoff notices were issued that day. Branstad stated that the task force's findings determined that the youth needed to be moved as soon as possible. Iowa representative Dean Fisher criticized the closing, arguing that there should have been private management brought in to manage the facility while youth would remain housed there; Fisher, of Garwin, had a representative district that included Tama County. Palmer stated that the decline in the number of adjudicated girls was one of the reasons why IJH was to be closed. Steve Sodders, a Democratic Iowa Senator from State Center, criticized the closure along with other Democrats from the Iowa Legislature who stated that it was a way of "privatizing" jobs from the state and a "hasty, unilateral" action.

The last youth under care of the facility left on Tuesday January 14, 2014. The employees believed that the center would close on Thursday, January 16, but it closed ahead of schedule on Wednesday January 15.

As a result of the closure, the Iowa Juvenile Home Foundation became inactive.

As of December 2014 the Liberty Baptist Church in Marshalltown was considering opening a Bible college for Chin refugees from Myanmar. The church would be able to get the property if/when the state gives away or sells the property.

=== Availability of facilities for delinquent girls ===
Since January 2014 Iowa has no juvenile correctional facility for girls; they are either tried in juvenile court and sent to out-of-state facilities, and/or are tried in adult court and sent to Iowa Department of Corrections facilities for female sentenced felons. As of July 2014, of 33 girls accused by the State of Iowa of committing crimes who would have been candidates for the IJH, most were placed in detention centers or youth shelters awaiting a longer-term assignment. One girl had returned home; she would be tried in adult court if she had committed any further criminal acts. Three girls were placed in adult court and three were sent to facilities in other states. The remainder were located in mental health and residential treatment centers.

In February 2014 Palmer stated in a Senate Human Resources Committee meeting that there was a need for a secure housing facility for delinquent girls.

=== Attempts to reopen the facility ===
In December 2013 a rally was held at South Tama High School attended by staff and former inmates was held to keep the facility open. An individual created a change.org petition to keep IJH open, and the petition got 610 signatures by December 18, 2013. A group of students addressed an audience at the Iowa Statehouse in January 2013, speaking in favor of the IJH. Employees and supporters formed the Save Our Home committee in an attempt to keep the facility open. David R. Nagle, a Waterloo resident and former member of the U.S. House of Representatives, worked pro bono to assist the group.

In January 2014 Sodders sponsored legislation in the Iowa Senate to try to reestablish the facility. 22 Democrats in the Iowa Senate sponsored that bill. In response Branstad stated on Iowa Public Television's "Iowa Press" that he included budgetary funds to provide remedial education for 117 former students who he stated had received below par education at the IJH, and that the students were better served in their new settings. In April 2014 an amendment to refund the IJH was passed but it was later removed from the bill so the budget could be passed.

=== Lawsuit ===
In January 2014 Danny Homan, the president of the American Federation of State, County and Municipal Employees (AFSCME) Iowa Council 61, the largest union of state employees in Iowa; along with four state legislators from the Democratic Party, filed a lawsuit against Governor Branstad and DHS head Charles Palmer in Polk County District Court in order to get an injunction to stop the closure of IJH. The four legislators included the Minority Leader of the Iowa House of Representatives, Mark Smith of Marshalltown, as well as Senator Jack Hatch of Des Moines, Sodders, and Representative Pat Murphy of Dubuque. Until the lawsuit is resolved, the state cannot sell or give away the IJH property.

In February 2014 Scott Rosenberg, the district judge of Polk County, ordered the facility to reopen. In response Branstad criticized the decision, stating that the children who were placed in the IJH and not the facility itself should be the focus. He asked the Iowa Supreme Court to overturn the ruling, and that month the court agreed to hear the appeal. In May 2015 the Iowa Supreme Court ordered the lower court to dismiss the case and reversed the decision to keep the school open. The court reasoned that since there was no funding appropriated in 2014 and because the center was already closed, it would be pointless to decide the issue.
