= Star-Clipper-Canfield Building and Winding Stairway =

- U.S. National Register of Historic Places
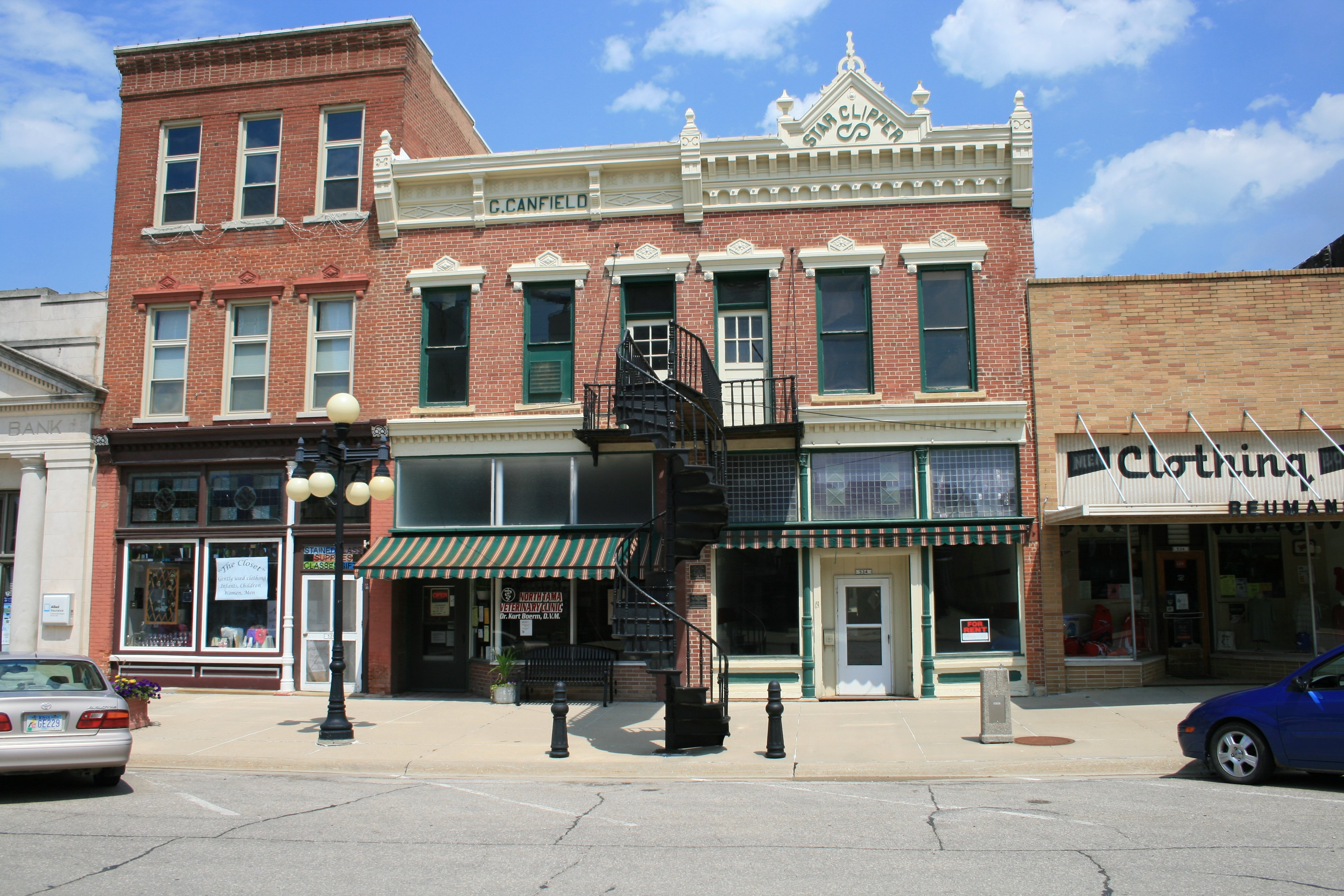

- Location within Iowa Location within the United States
- Location: 534 2nd St. Traer, Iowa
- Coordinates: 42°11′36″N 92°27′59″W
- Area: less than one acre
- Built: 1894
- Built by: Burlington Iron Works
- Architect: E.E. Taylor
- NRHP reference No.: 75000699
- Added to NRHP: October 29, 1975

The Star-Clipper-Canfield Building and Winding Stairway are located in Traer, Iowa, United States. The staircase is thought to be one of a kind in the country, and it was featured on a U.S. commemorative stamp. The exterior winding staircase was designed by E.E. Taylor of Burlington, Iowa, and built by the Burlington Iron Works. The staircase was built outside because there was no room for one inside of the buildings. The Canfield Building, to which it is attached, was built the same year. The Star-Clipper Building was completed in 1888. The complex served as a newspaper office until 1953 when it was converted into commercial use. It was listed on the National Register of Historic Places in 1975.
