= King Tower Historic District =

Historic district in Iowa, United States

- U.S. National Register of Historic Places
- U.S. Historic district
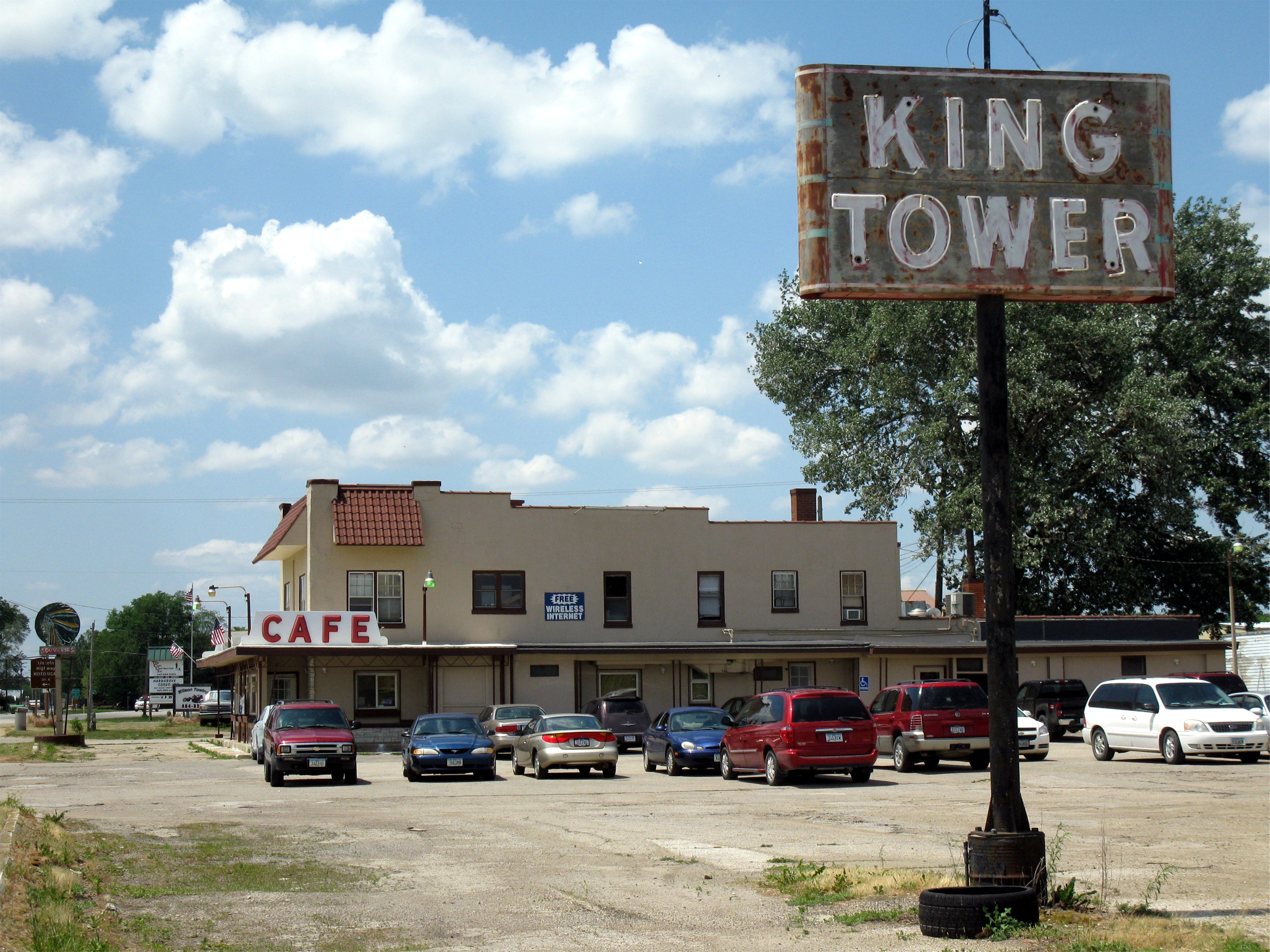

- Location within Iowa Location within the United States
- Location: 1701 E. 5th St. / Business 30; Tama, Iowa
- Coordinates: 41°57′51″N 92°33′26″W
- Built: 1937, 1938
- Architectural style: Spanish Colonial Revival
- NRHP reference No.: 100004998
- Added to NRHP: March 3, 2020

The King Tower Historic District, also known as The King Tower One-Stop, is a historic district located in Tama, Iowa, United States. It was listed on the National Register of Historic Places in 2020. The King Tower One-Stop is a gas station, tourist court, and cafe built by Wes Mansfield on the Lincoln Highway. The Spanish Colonial Revival gas station and cafe was completed in 1937, and 18 tourist cabins were completed the following year. The historic district is an example of a "one stop-food, gas, auto repair and tourist cabins" that were built during "the transition from mom-and-pop roadside businesses to the national chain gas, food and lodging businesses that would soon dominate the trade." At one time it was open 24-hours-a-day, seven-days-a-week. In addition to over-the-road truckers, travelers, law enforcement officers, and local families, it was a place the town's bar patrons would go after the bars closed at 2:00 am. Local clubs and organizations held their meetings here. It was also a stopping point for presidential hopefuls before the Iowa caucuses.

The cafe and gas station building and one of the tourist cabins are still in existence. The cafe is still in operation. Wall murals painted in the 1950s are still in place on the cafe's walls. A house that housed the business' manager is located to the north of the main building.
