= Conant's Cabin and Park =

- U.S. National Register of Historic Places
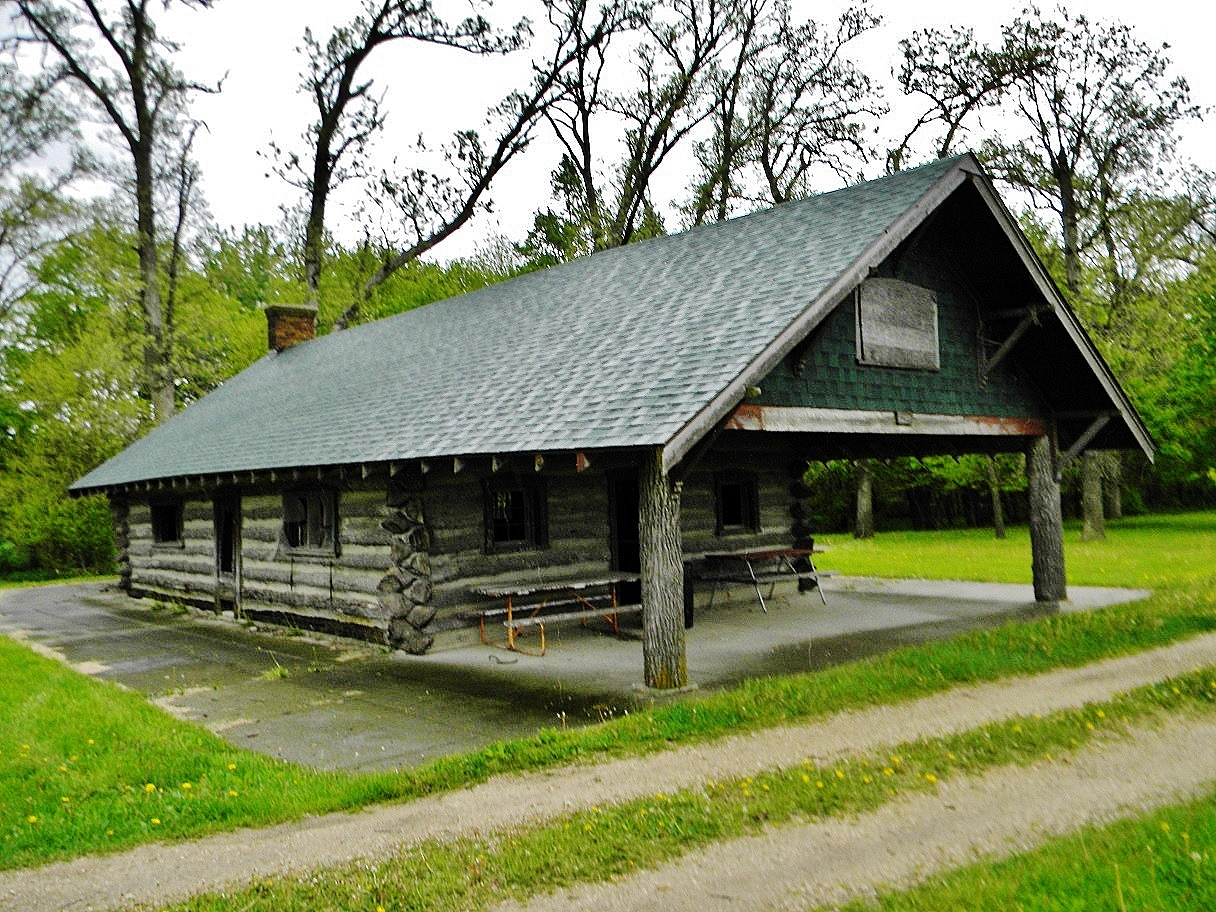

- Location within Iowa Location within the United States
- Location: Iowa Highway 96, 3 miles east of Gladbrook
- Coordinates: 42°10′37″N 92°39′19″W
- Area: 15 acres (6.1 ha)
- Built: 1920
- Built by: George Conant
- Architectural style: American Craftsman
- NRHP reference No.: 00000920
- Added to NRHP: December 14, 2000

Conant's Cabin and Park, also known as the Rural Wayside Rest and Recreation Site, is a private park located east of Gladbrook, Iowa, United States. It was built in 1920 by local resident George Conant on 15 acres (6.1 ha) of farmland that he owned. The American Craftsman-style cabin was inspired by his father, J.W. Conant, who wanted to see a cabin like he constructed in 1855 built in the grove of bur oak trees. The two-room log structure is possibly the oldest park shelter in Iowa. In addition to the cabin the park features two outhouses, outdoor and indoor picnic tables, grills, a swing, merry-go-round and horseshoe pit. The park was meant for public use even though it has remained under private ownership throughout its existence. It is rumored that author Robert Waller began his notes for The Bridges of Madison County during a stop at the park. The park's existence is an expression of one man's civic pride, and sense of community responsibility. Numerous community service groups have helped to maintain it over the years. It was listed on the National Register of Historic Places in 2000.
