= Gen. Mason J. Young House =

Historic house in New Hampshire, United States

- U.S. National Register of Historic Places
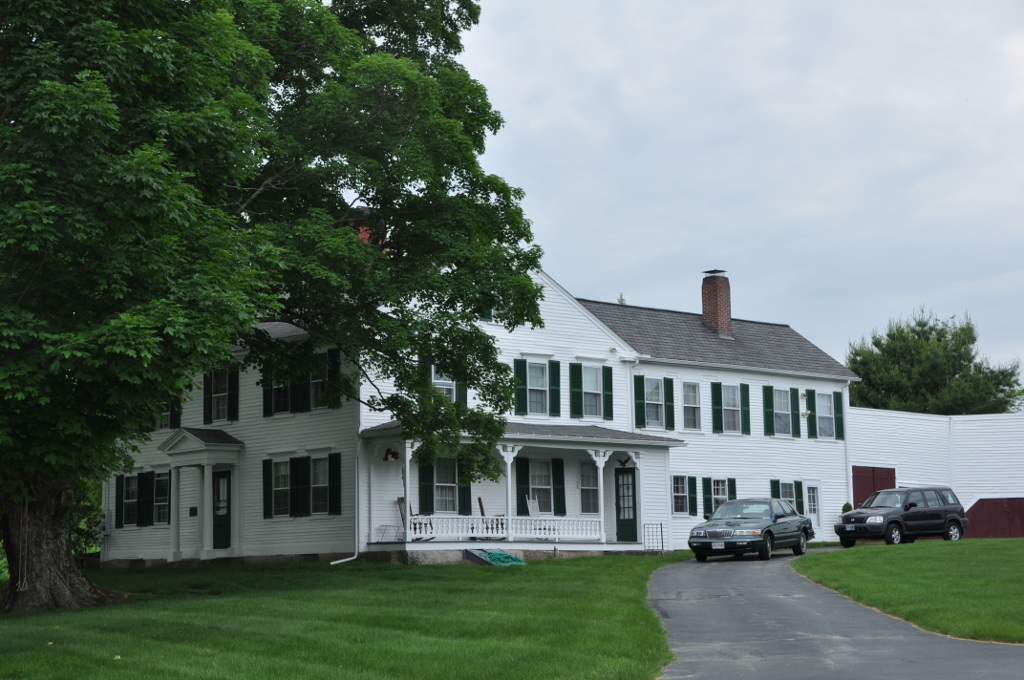

- Location within New Hampshire Location within the United States
- Location: 4 Young Rd., Londonderry, New Hampshire
- Coordinates: 42°50′41″N 71°21′56″W
- Area: 3.4 acres (1.4 ha)
- Built: 1802
- NRHP reference No.: 86000281
- Added to NRHP: February 27, 1986

The Gen. Mason J. Young House, also known as the William Boyd House, is a historic house and connected farm complex at 4 Young Road in Londonderry, New Hampshire. With a building history dating to 1802, it is a well-preserved example of a New England connected farmstead. The house was listed on the National Register of Historic Places in 1986.

== Description and history ==
The Gen. Mason J. Young House is located just off Londonderry's commercial area of New Hampshire Route 102, at the corner of Young Road and Cross Road. It is a 2 1/2-story wood-frame structure with a gable roof and a central chimney. It is five bays wide and three deep with a columned portico (c. 1900) sheltering its front entry, and a single-story porch (dating to the mid-19th century) extending along the side. The interior has well-preserved period woodwork. A two-story wing extends to the rear of the house, which is further extended by a series of sheds connecting the house to a carriage house and dairy barn.

The main house is reported by family accounts to have been built in 1802, on a farm that was in active use since 1757. The land was first settled by Mason Boyd, and the house was built by William Boyd. Originally a subsistence farm, it was transformed into a dairy farm in the mid-19th century, delivering milk and other products to Boston by railroad. In the 20th century a shift began toward the production of apples. The property was registered as a Bicentennial Farm in 1976, reflecting over 200 years of ownership by a single family.

== See also ==
- National Register of Historic Places listings in Rockingham County, New Hampshire
