= John Young House (Muscoda, Wisconsin) =

Historic house in Wisconsin, United States

- U.S. National Register of Historic Places
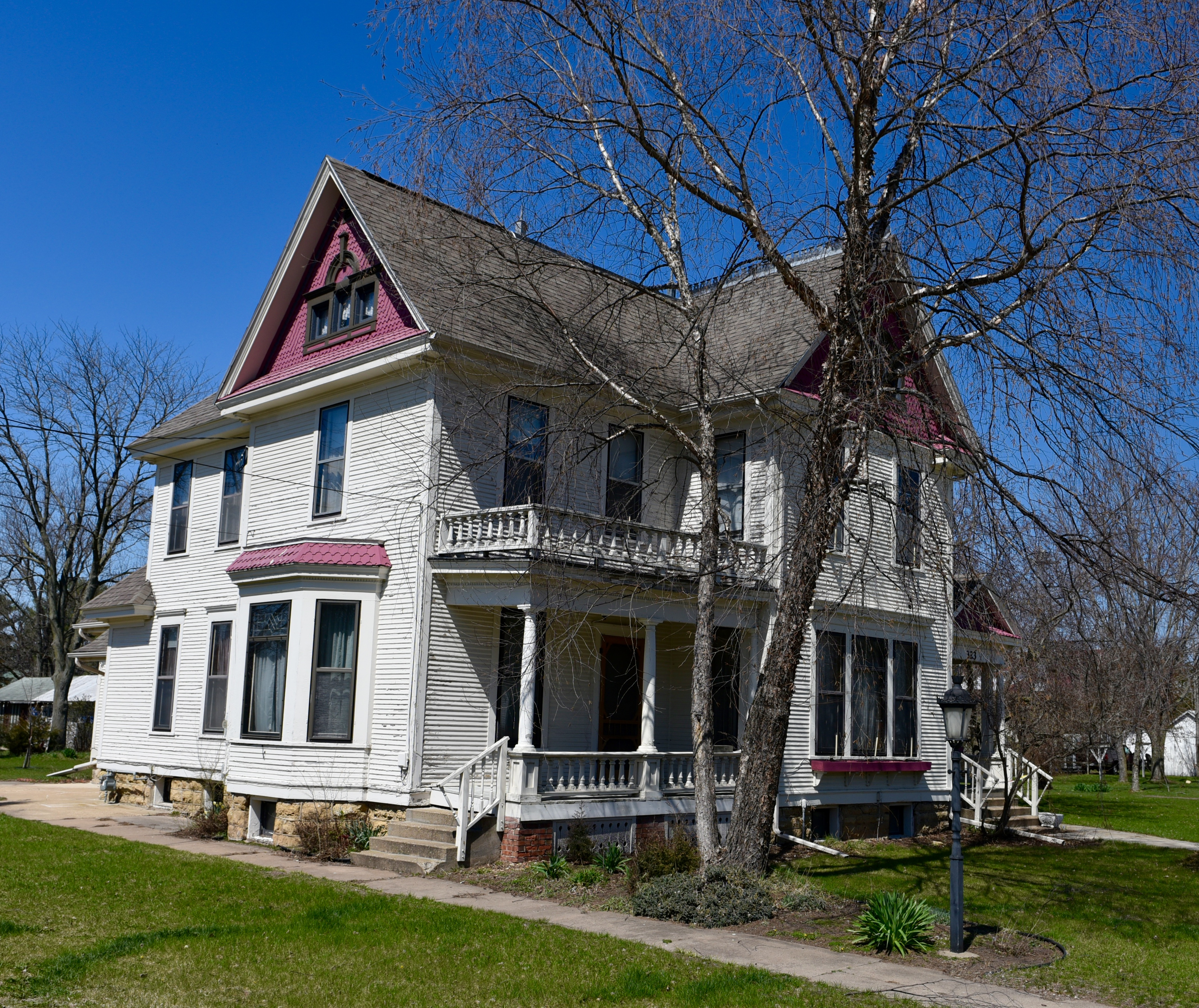
- John Young House
- Location: 323 S. Wisconsin Ave., Muscoda, Wisconsin
- Coordinates: 43°10′57″N 90°26′35″W
- Area: 1 acre (0.40 ha)
- Architect: John and Charles Wade
- Architectural style: Queen Anne
- NRHP reference No.: 94001157
- Added to NRHP: September 26, 1994

The John Young House is located in Muscoda, Wisconsin.

== History ==
John Young was a German immigrant who served in the American Civil War and worked as a lumber dealer. The house was for some time a bed and breakfast but since the owner has died it is now a private residence. It was added to the State and the National Register of Historic Places in 1994.
