= Benjamin Young House (Stevensville, Montana) =

Historic house in Montana, United States

- U.S. National Register of Historic Places
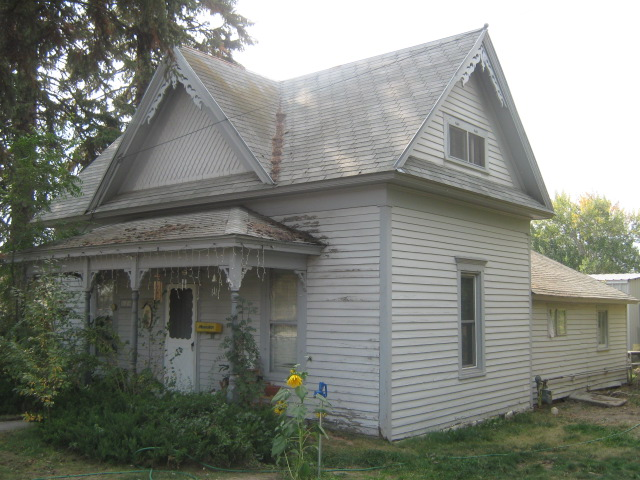

- Location within Montana Location within the United States
- Location: 523 Main St., Stevensville, Montana
- Coordinates: 46°30′18″N 114°5′33″W
- Built: 1900
- Built by: Young, Benjamin
- Architectural style: Late Gothic Revival
- MPS: Stevensville MPS
- NRHP reference No.: 91000741
- Added to NRHP: June 19, 1991

Benjamin Young House in Stevensville, Montana, also known as Cole House, is a 1 1/2-story cross-gabled Carpenter Gothic house which was built in 1900 and has since been expanded. It was built by a relatively rare plank-wall construction method.

It was listed on the National Register of Historic Places in 1991.

A root house built in 1909, a root cellar also built in 1909, and a garage are contributing buildings.
