= John W. Young Round Barn =

- U.S. National Register of Historic Places
- Location within Iowa Location within the United States
- Location: Off U.S. Route 63
- Nearest city: Traer, Iowa
- Coordinates: 42°11′0″N 92°28′26.5″W
- Area: less than one acre
- Built: 1917
- Built by: Joe Seda
- MPS: Iowa Round Barns: The Sixty Year Experiment TR
- NRHP reference No.: 86001444
- Added to NRHP: June 30, 1986

The John W. Young Round Barn is an historic building located near Traer in rural Tama County, Iowa, United States. It was built in 1917 by Joe Seda as a general purpose barn. The building is a true round barn that measures 65 feet (20 m) in diameter. The structure is constructed in clay tile and features a two-pitch roof and an 18-foot (5.5 m) central silo that is 45 feet (14 m) high. It has been listed on the National Register of Historic Places since 1986.
