= Tama County Courthouse =

- U.S. National Register of Historic Places
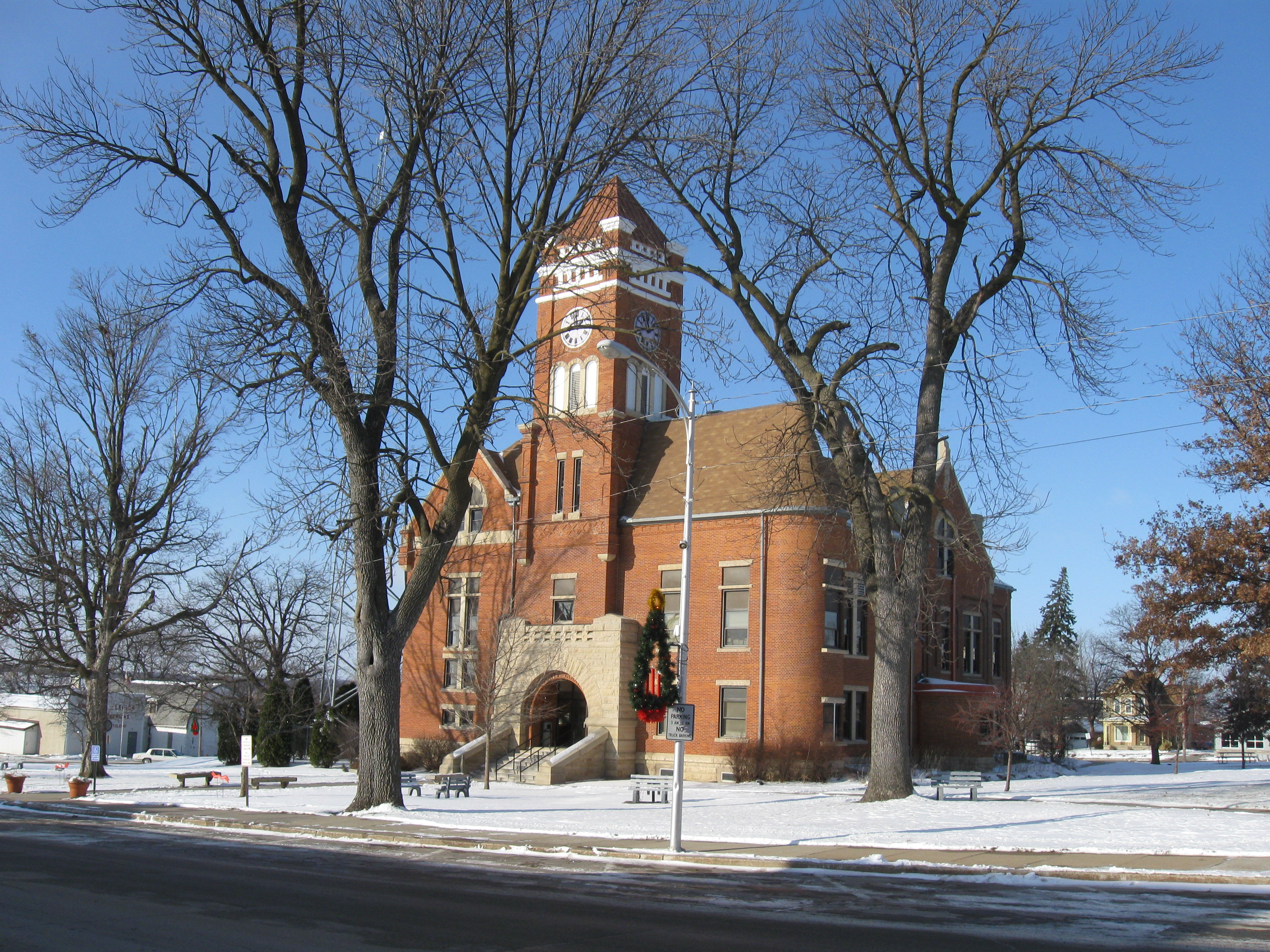

- Location within Iowa Location within the United States
- Interactive map showing the location of Tama County Courthouse
- Location: State St. Toledo, Iowa
- Coordinates: 41°59′49″N 92°34′39″W
- Area: less than one acre
- Built: 1866
- Built by: P.B. McCullough; H.B. Belton
- Architect: W.R. Parsons & Son
- Architectural style: Romanesque
- MPS: County Courthouses in Iowa TR
- NRHP reference No.: 81000269
- Added to NRHP: July 02, 1981

The Tama County Courthouse is located in Toledo, Iowa, United States. It was listed on the National Register of Historic Places in 1981. The courthouse is the second building the county has used for court functions and county administration.

== History ==
The first courthouse for Tama County was a two-story frame structure built in 1854 for $1,300. The present courthouse is a Victorian Romanesque style building completed in 1866. It was designed by W.R. Parsons & Son. P.B. McCullough of Toledo won the contract to build the building, however their bid was artificially low and they could not afford to complete it. H.B. Belton completed construction. The final construction cost was $22,000, but the county had accepted a $5,000 bid and that is what they paid.

== Architecture ==
The courthouse is a two-story structure composed of red bricks and stone. The main facade features a large stone arch with a recessed entry. A large square clock tower rises in the middle of the same facade and it is capped with a pyramid roof. The belfry can be reached from a stairway on the second floor. The foundation is rusticated stone while the roof is corrugated iron. Gable ends rise above the roofline at various places around the building. The significance of the courthouse is derived from its association with county government, and the political power and prestige of Toledo as the county seat.
