= Young-Leach Cobblestone Farmhouse and Barn Complex =

Historic house in New York, United States

- U.S. National Register of Historic Places
- Location within New York Location within the United States
- Location: 2601 NY 14, Torrey, New York
- Coordinates: 42°38′16″N 76°56′21″W
- Area: 102.2 acres (41.4 ha)
- Built: ca. 1836
- Architectural style: Greek Revival, Federal, Vernacular Greek Revival
- MPS: Cobblestone Architecture of New York State MPS
- NRHP reference No.: 92000440
- Added to NRHP: May 11, 1992

Young-Leach Cobblestone Farmhouse and Barn Complex is a historic home located at Torrey in Yates County, New York. The farmhouse was built about 1836 and is a large late Federal / early Greek Revival style cobblestone structure. It is built of variously colored and shaped field cobbles. The farmhouse is among the nine surviving cobblestone buildings in Yates County. The barn complex includes two barns, a shed, machine shed, and a corn crib.

It was listed on the National Register of Historic Places in 1992.
