= John Eben Young House =

Historic building in Portland, Oregon, U.S.

- U.S. National Register of Historic Places
- U.S. Historic district – Contributing property
- Portland Historic Landmark
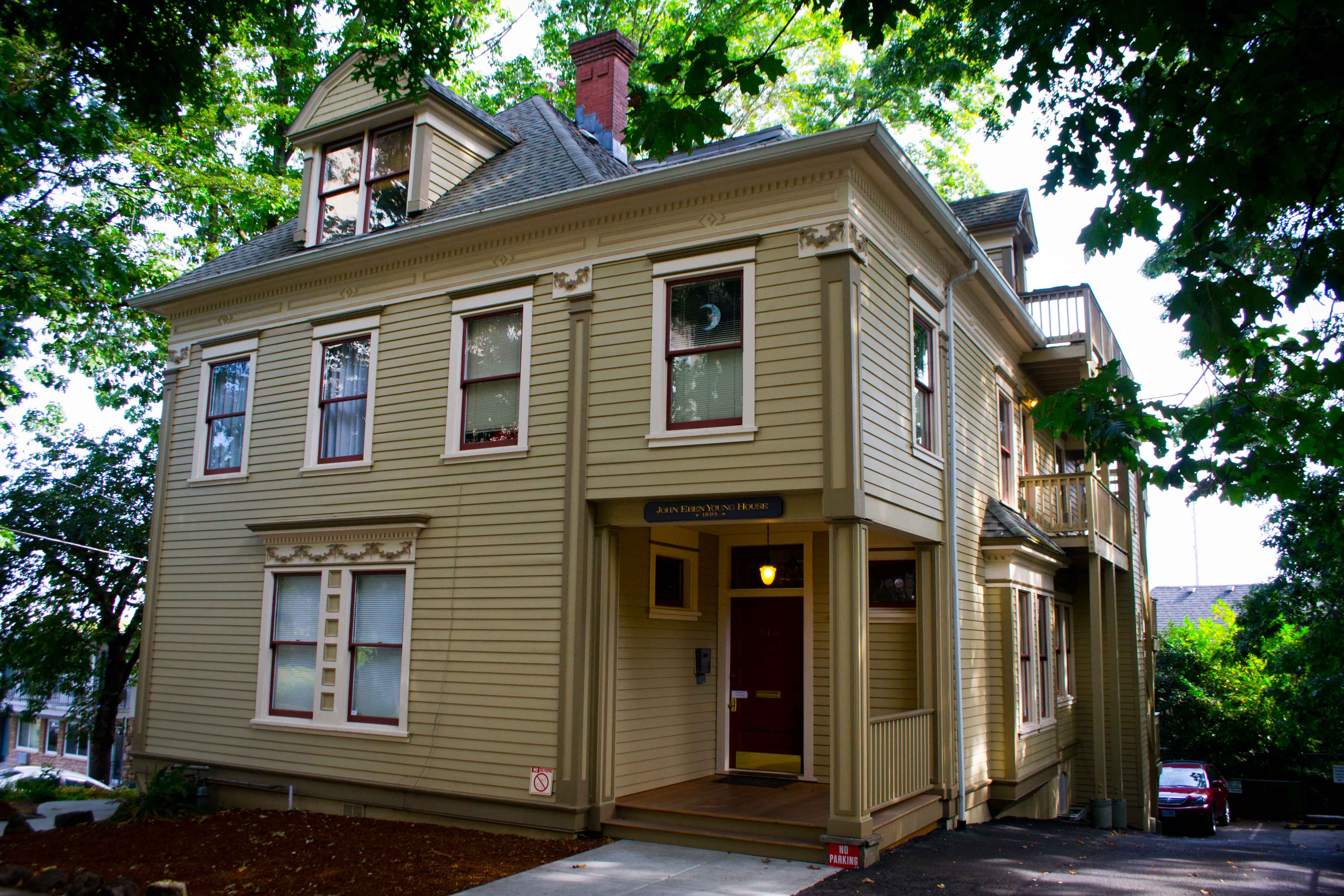

- Location within Portland, Oregon
- Location: 916 SW King Avenue; Portland, Oregon
- Coordinates: 45°31′18″N 122°41′43″W
- Area: 0.1 acres (0.040 ha)
- Built: 1896
- Architectural style: Colonial Revival
- Part of: King's Hill Historic District (ID91000039)
- NRHP reference No.: 88001312
- Added to NRHP: August 25, 1988

The John Eben Young House is a house located in southwest Portland, Oregon listed on the National Register of Historic Places.

== See also ==
- National Register of Historic Places listings in Southwest Portland, Oregon
