= Traer, Iowa =

- City
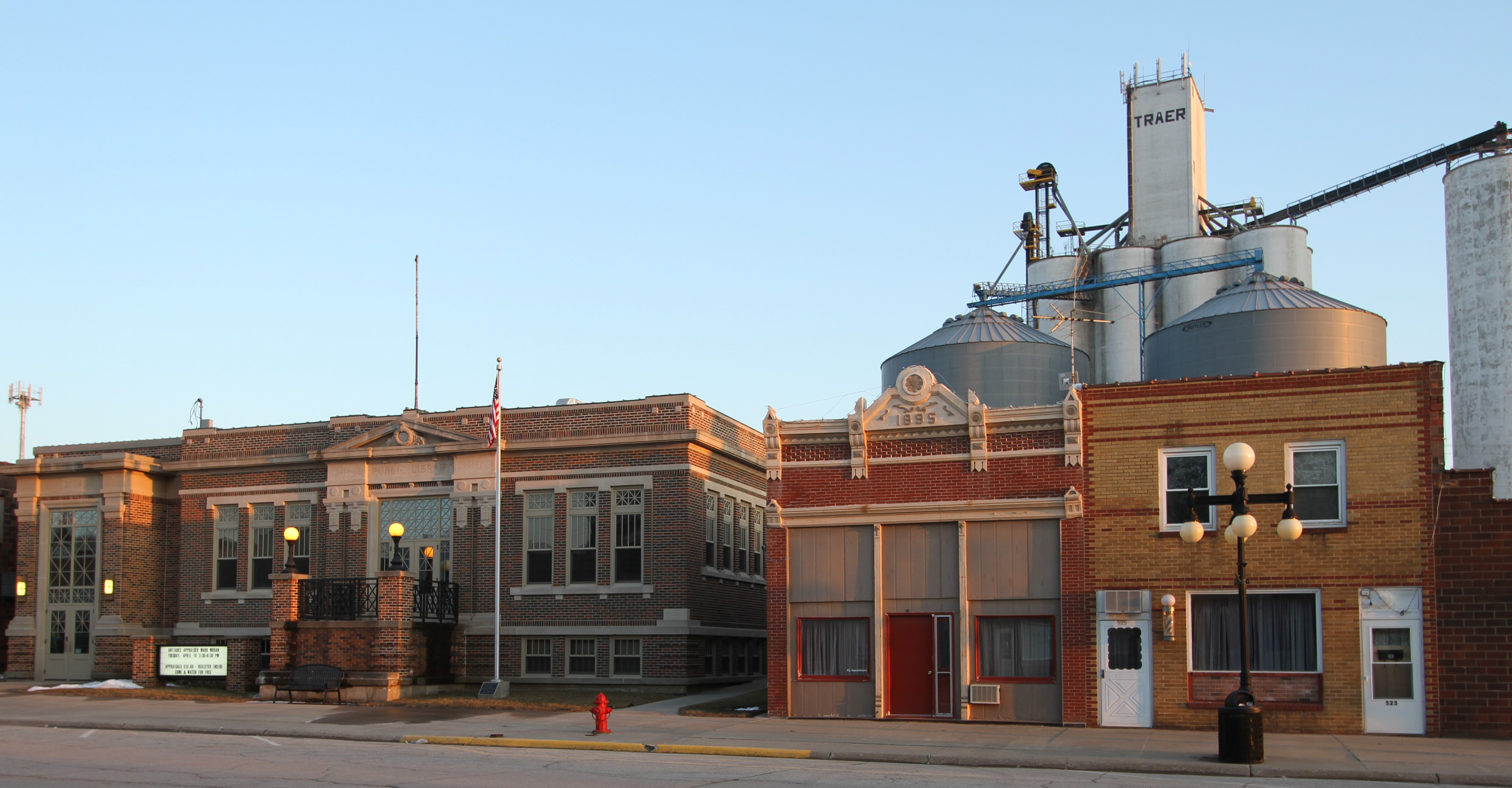
- Downtown buildings including the Carnegie library and grain elevator

- Location of Traer, Iowa
- Coordinates: 42°11′22″N 92°27′51″W
- Country: United States
- State: Iowa
- County: Tama

Area
  - Total: 1.29 sq mi (3.34 km^{2})
  - Land: 1.29 sq mi (3.34 km^{2})
  - Water: 0 sq mi (0.00 km^{2})
- Elevation: 955 ft (291 m)

Population (2020)
  - Total: 1,583
  - Density: 1,227.7/sq mi (474.02/km^{2})
- Time zone: UTC-6 (Central (CST))
  - Summer (DST): UTC-5 (CDT)
- ZIP code: 50675
- Area code: 319
- FIPS code: 19-78735
- GNIS feature ID: 2397046
- Website: www.traer.com

Traer is a city in Tama County, Iowa, United States. The population was 1,583 at the time of the 2020 census.

Traer is known for the iron spiral staircase that originally led to the office of the local newspaper. The staircase is freestanding, reverse-spiral and connected to the building with a suspended walkway, a somewhat rare arrangement.

== History ==
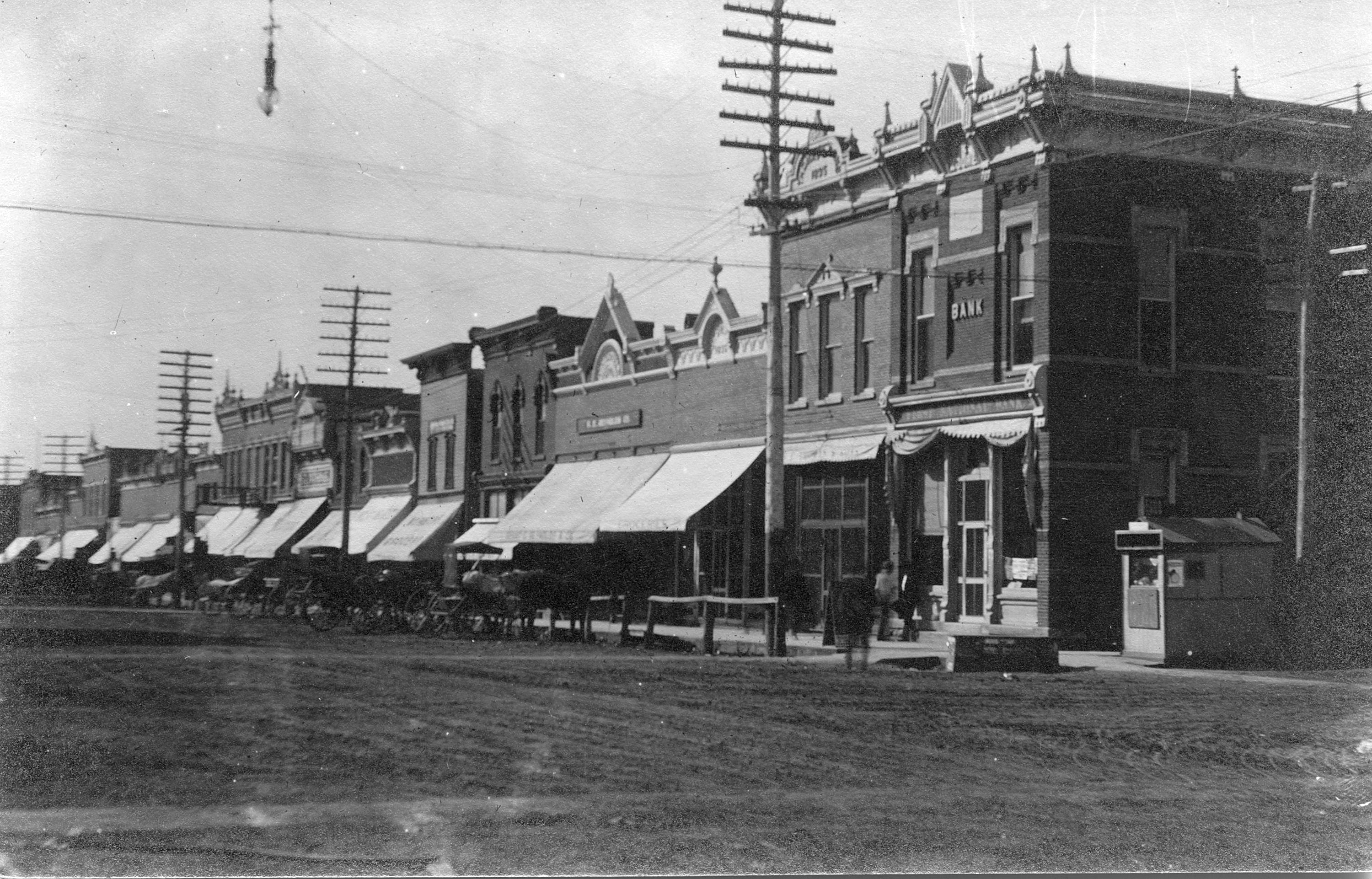
Main Street, 1910

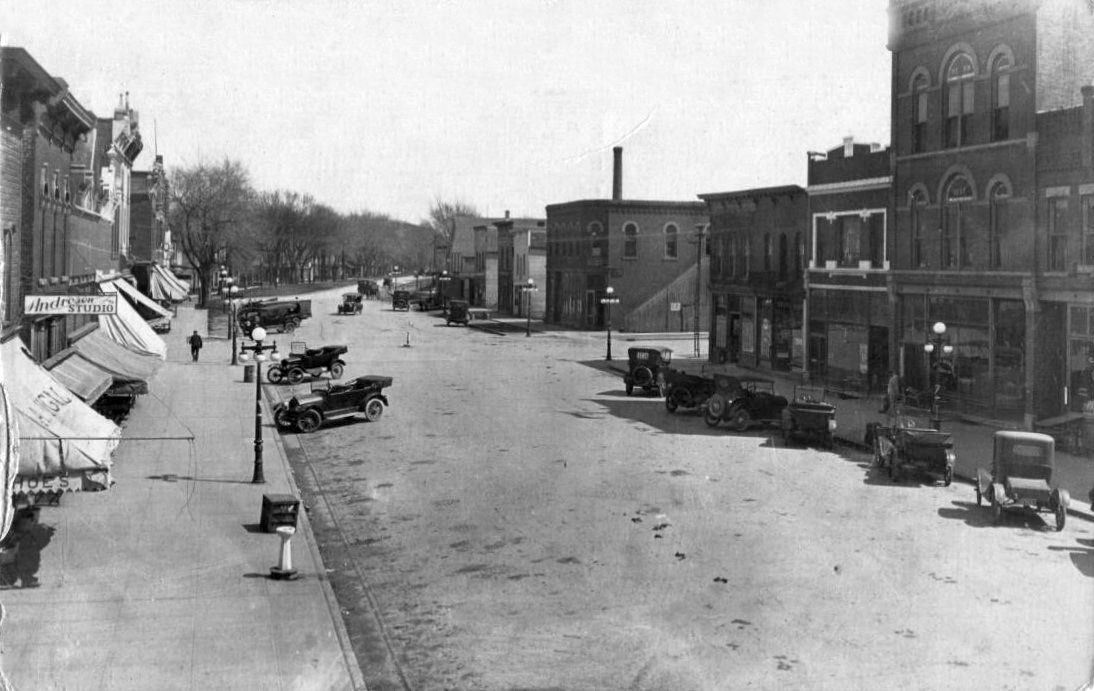
Downtown, 1918

Traer got its start in the year 1873, following construction of Burlington, Cedar Rapids and Northern Railway through the territory. The city was named for John W. Traer.

== Geography ==
Traer is located in Perry Township.

According to the United States Census Bureau, the city has a total area of 1.18 square miles (3.06 km^{2}), all land.

Important roads in Traer include U.S. Route 63 and Iowa Highway 8.

== Demographics ==
Historical populations
Year	Pop.	±%
1880	1,100	—
1890	1,014	−7.8%
1900	1,458	+43.8%
1910	1,283	−12.0%
1920	1,329	+3.6%
1930	1,417	+6.6%
1940	1,493	+5.4%
1950	1,627	+9.0%
1960	1,623	−0.2%
1970	1,682	+3.6%
1980	1,703	+1.2%
1990	1,552	−8.9%
2000	1,594	+2.7%
2010	1,703	+6.8%
2020	1,583	−7.0%
Source:"U.S. Census website". United States Census Bureau. and Iowa Data Center; Source: U.S. Decennial Census

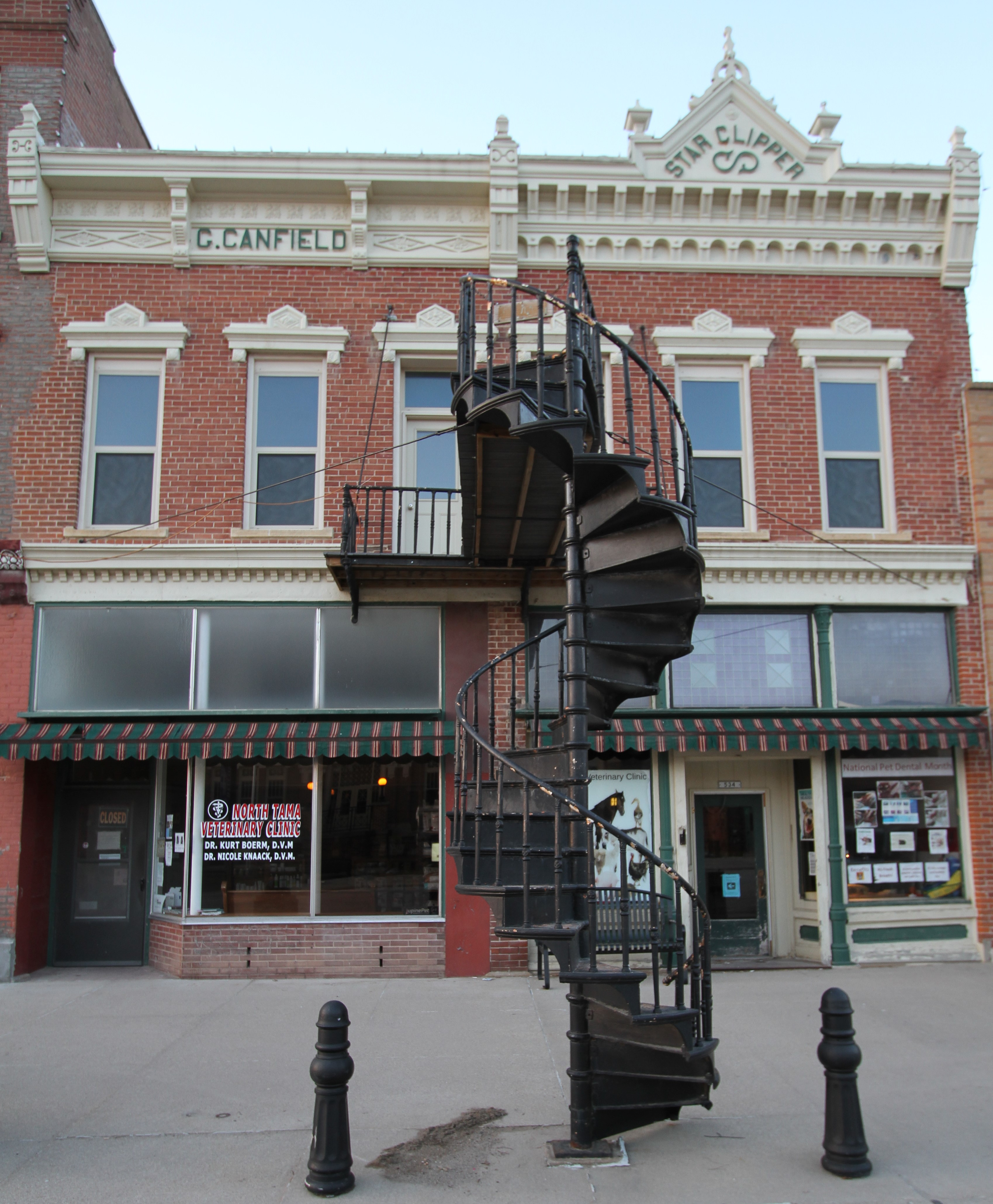
The Star-Clipper-Canfield Building and Winding Stairway is listed on the National Register of Historic Places

=== 2020 census ===
As of the 2020 census, there were 1,583 people, 677 households, and 418 families residing in the city. The population density was 1,227.7 inhabitants per square mile (474.0/km^{2}). There were 742 housing units at an average density of 575.5 per square mile (222.2/km^{2}).

Of the 677 households, 26.7% had children under the age of 18 living in them. Of all households, 46.5% were married-couple households, 5.8% were cohabiting-couple households, 20.1% were households with a male householder and no spouse or partner present, and 27.6% were households with a female householder and no spouse or partner present. About 38.3% of households were non-families, 32.7% of all households were made up of individuals, and 18.2% had someone living alone who was 65 years of age or older. There were 742 housing units, of which 8.8% were vacant. The homeowner vacancy rate was 1.6% and the rental vacancy rate was 9.0%.

The median age was 45.8 years. 21.4% of residents were under the age of 18, 23.6% were under the age of 20, and 25.9% were 65 years of age or older. 4.6% were between the ages of 20 and 24, 20.7% were from 25 to 44, and 25.2% were from 45 to 64. For every 100 females there were 89.4 males, and for every 100 females age 18 and over there were 87.9 males age 18 and over. The gender makeup of the city was 47.2% male and 52.8% female. 0.0% of residents lived in urban areas, while 100.0% lived in rural areas.

Racial composition as of the 2020 census
Race	Number	Percent
White	1,493	94.3%
Black or African American	15	0.9%
American Indian and Alaska Native	7	0.4%
Asian	6	0.4%
Native Hawaiian and Other Pacific Islander	1	0.1%
Some other race	7	0.4%
Two or more races	54	3.4%
Hispanic or Latino (of any race)	24	1.5%

=== 2010 census ===
As of the census of 2010, there were 1,703 people, 693 households, and 458 families living in the city. The population density was 1,443.2 inhabitants per square mile (557.2/km^{2}). There were 778 housing units at an average density of 659.3 per square mile (254.6/km^{2}). The racial makeup of the city was 98.0% White, 0.2% African American, 0.2% Native American, 0.4% Asian, 0.1% Pacific Islander, 0.1% from other races, and 1.1% from two or more races. Hispanic or Latino of any race were 0.8% of the population.

There were 693 households, of which 30.2% had children under the age of 18 living with them, 52.8% were married couples living together, 9.7% had a female householder with no husband present, 3.6% had a male householder with no wife present, and 33.9% were non-families. 30.0% of all households were made up of individuals, and 18.9% had someone living alone who was 65 years of age or older. The average household size was 2.35 and the average family size was 2.91.

The median age in the city was 43.5 years. 23.7% of residents were under the age of 18; 6.2% were between the ages of 18 and 24; 22.6% were from 25 to 44; 22.2% were from 45 to 64; and 25.1% were 65 years of age or older. The gender makeup of the city was 47.6% male and 52.4% female.

=== 2000 census ===
As of the census of 2000, there were 1,594 people, 686 households, and 443 families living in the city. The population density was 1,446.4 inhabitants per square mile (558.5/km^{2}). There were 728 housing units at an average density of 660.6 per square mile (255.1/km^{2}). The racial makeup of the city was 99.31% White, 0.31% African American, 0.13% Asian, and 0.25% from two or more races. Hispanic or Latino of any race were 0.13% of the population.

There were 686 households, out of which 25.2% had children under the age of 18 living with them, 55.5% were married couples living together, 6.0% had a female householder with no husband present, and 35.3% were non-families. 31.0% of all households were made up of individuals, and 20.1% had someone living alone who was 65 years of age or older. The average household size was 2.21 and the average family size was 2.75.

20.9% were under the age of 18, 6.1% from 18 to 24, 23.1% from 25 to 44, 21.7% from 45 to 64, and 28.2% were 65 years of age or older. The median age was 45 years. For every 100 females, there were 86.4 males. For every 100 females age 18 and over, there were 81.4 males.

The median income for a household in the city was $35,329, and the median income for a family was $43,375. Males had a median income of $30,882 versus $20,670 for females. The per capita income for the city was $17,811. About 4.9% of families and 7.0% of the population were below the poverty line, including 7.6% of those under age 18 and 8.0% of those age 65 or over.

== Government ==
The city is governed by a mayor-council government, with a five-member council. It employs an attorney, a treasurer, a clerk and deputy clerk, and a gas and building inspector. The city runs multiple committees, on finance, streets, airport and garbage, recreation, public services, and protection. City boards include those responsible for the library, the airport, the parks, the memorial building, planning and zoning, the Wilson Nature Preserve, and historic preservation.

== Education ==
Traer is within the North Tama County Community School District.

== Infrastructure ==
Services provided by the city include a fire department, an ambulance service, a swimming pool, a public library, an airport, and two parks.

== Notable people ==
- James "Tama Jim" Wilson lived in Traer after serving as U.S. Secretary of Agriculture.
- Margaret Wilson, who won the Pulitzer Prize for fiction in 1924, was born in Traer.
