= Toledo, Iowa =

- City
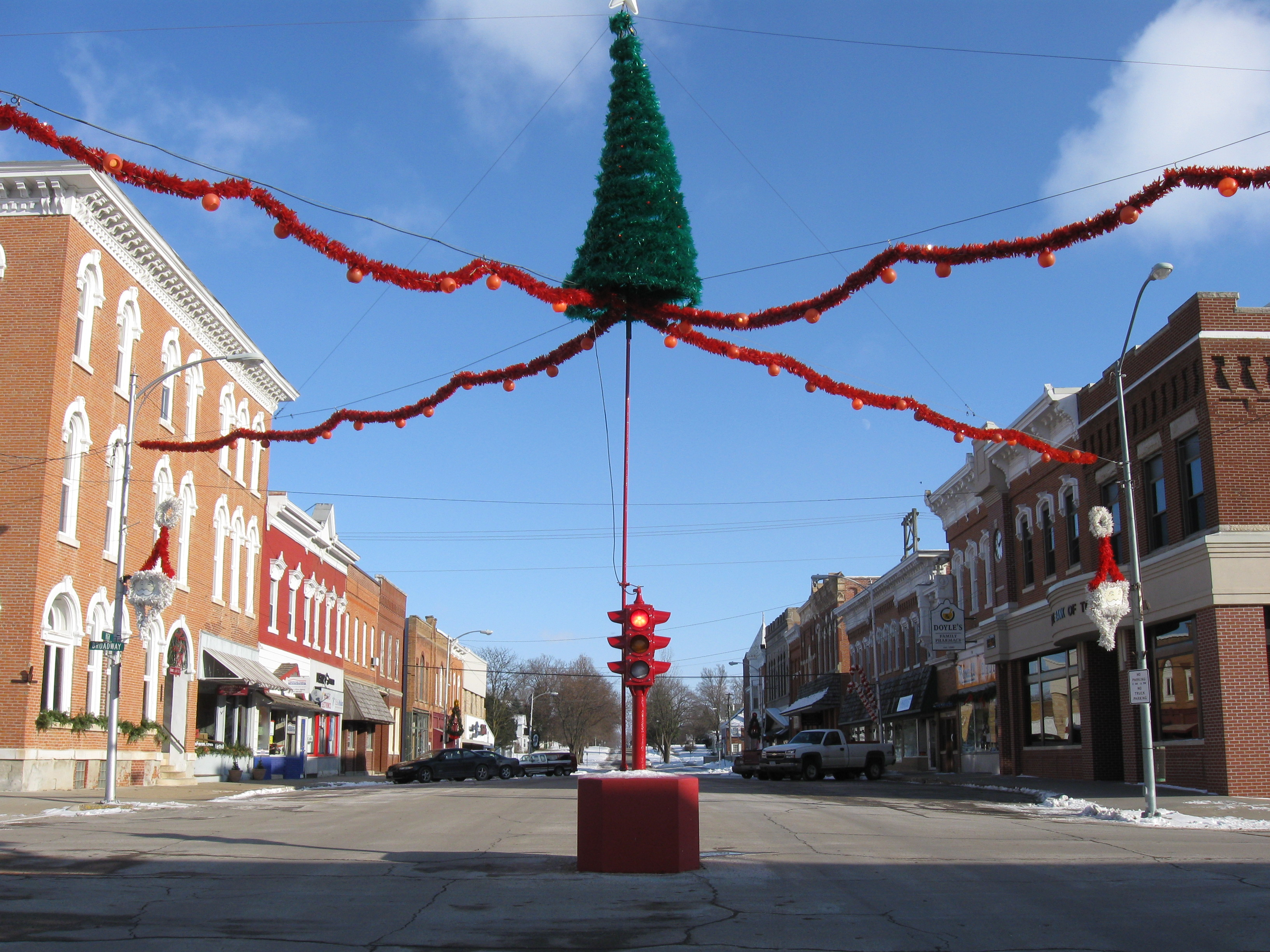
- Downtown Toledo
- Nickname: Twin Cities
- Motto: Remembering Our Past, Looking Toward Our Future
- Location of Toledo, Iowa
- Coordinates: 41°59′44″N 92°34′40″W
- Country: United States
- State: Iowa
- County: Tama

Area
  - Total: 2.29 sq mi (5.94 km^{2})
  - Land: 2.29 sq mi (5.94 km^{2})
  - Water: 0 sq mi (0.00 km^{2})
- Elevation: 869 ft (265 m)

Population (2020)
  - Total: 2,369
  - Density: 1,032.3/sq mi (398.59/km^{2})
- Time zone: UTC-6 (Central (CST))
  - Summer (DST): UTC-5 (CDT)
- ZIP code: 52342
- Area code: 641
- FIPS code: 19-78510
- GNIS feature ID: 2397033
- Website: www.toledoia.com

Toledo is a city in, and the county seat of Tama County, Iowa, United States. The population was 2,369 at the time of the 2020 census.

== History ==
Toledo was founded in 1853 as the county seat of Tama County. It was named after Toledo, Ohio. Toledo was incorporated as a city in 1866.

== Geography ==
According to the United States Census Bureau, the city has a total area of 2.30 square miles (5.96 km^{2}), all land.

=== Climate ===
According to the Köppen Climate Classification system, Toledo has a hot-summer humid continental climate, abbreviated "Dfa" on climate maps.

Climate data for Toledo, Iowa, 1991–2020 normals, extremes 1894–present
Month	Jan	Feb	Mar	Apr	May	Jun	Jul	Aug	Sep	Oct	Nov	Dec	Year
Record high °F (°C)	63 (17)	72 (22)	88 (31)	95 (35)	106 (41)	105 (41)	109 (43)	108 (42)	103 (39)	95 (35)	82 (28)	73 (23)	109 (43)
Mean maximum °F (°C)	48.5 (9.2)	54.4 (12.4)	70.4 (21.3)	80.8 (27.1)	87.3 (30.7)	91.8 (33.2)	93.0 (33.9)	91.4 (33.0)	89.5 (31.9)	83.0 (28.3)	67.8 (19.9)	53.5 (11.9)	94.6 (34.8)
Mean daily maximum °F (°C)	26.8 (−2.9)	31.5 (−0.3)	45.1 (7.3)	59.2 (15.1)	70.3 (21.3)	79.7 (26.5)	83.0 (28.3)	81.1 (27.3)	75.1 (23.9)	62.0 (16.7)	46.0 (7.8)	32.6 (0.3)	57.7 (14.3)
Daily mean °F (°C)	18.1 (−7.7)	22.4 (−5.3)	34.9 (1.6)	47.5 (8.6)	59.2 (15.1)	69.2 (20.7)	72.5 (22.5)	70.2 (21.2)	62.9 (17.2)	50.4 (10.2)	36.3 (2.4)	24.2 (−4.3)	47.3 (8.5)
Mean daily minimum °F (°C)	9.4 (−12.6)	13.2 (−10.4)	24.6 (−4.1)	35.7 (2.1)	48.0 (8.9)	58.7 (14.8)	61.9 (16.6)	59.3 (15.2)	50.8 (10.4)	38.9 (3.8)	26.6 (−3.0)	15.8 (−9.0)	36.9 (2.7)
Mean minimum °F (°C)	−13.2 (−25.1)	−8.2 (−22.3)	3.3 (−15.9)	21.2 (−6.0)	33.7 (0.9)	46.2 (7.9)	51.7 (10.9)	49.4 (9.7)	36.3 (2.4)	23.4 (−4.8)	9.9 (−12.3)	−5.2 (−20.7)	−17.1 (−27.3)
Record low °F (°C)	−31 (−35)	−34 (−37)	−31 (−35)	5 (−15)	22 (−6)	34 (1)	40 (4)	34 (1)	17 (−8)	−8 (−22)	−10 (−23)	−28 (−33)	−34 (−37)
Average precipitation inches (mm)	0.98 (25)	1.01 (26)	1.79 (45)	3.51 (89)	4.80 (122)	5.60 (142)	4.05 (103)	3.99 (101)	3.48 (88)	2.82 (72)	2.02 (51)	1.20 (30)	35.25 (894)
Average snowfall inches (cm)	8.6 (22)	7.9 (20)	4.2 (11)	1.1 (2.8)	0.2 (0.51)	0.0 (0.0)	0.0 (0.0)	0.0 (0.0)	0.0 (0.0)	0.4 (1.0)	1.8 (4.6)	8.6 (22)	32.8 (83.91)
Average precipitation days (≥ 0.01 in)	6.9	6.9	7.8	10.2	11.7	11.5	8.8	9.5	7.8	8.2	6.6	6.6	102.5
Average snowy days (≥ 0.1 in)	4.8	4.6	2.4	0.7	0.1	0.0	0.0	0.0	0.0	0.3	1.2	4.2	18.3
Source 1: NOAA
Source 2: National Weather Service

== Demographics ==
Historical populations
Year	Pop.	±%
1870	888	—
1880	1,026	+15.5%
1890	1,836	+78.9%
1900	1,941	+5.7%
1910	1,626	−16.2%
1920	1,604	−1.4%
1930	1,825	+13.8%
1940	2,073	+13.6%
1950	2,106	+1.6%
1960	2,417	+14.8%
1970	2,361	−2.3%
1980	2,455	+4.0%
1990	2,380	−3.1%
2000	2,539	+6.7%
2010	2,341	−7.8%
2020	2,369	+1.2%
Source:"U.S. Census website". United States Census Bureau. and Iowa Data Center; Source: U.S. Decennial Census

=== 2020 census ===
As of the 2020 census, Toledo had a population of 2,369 people, with 935 households and 605 families residing in the city.

The population density was 1,032.4 inhabitants per square mile (398.6/km^{2}). There were 1,029 housing units at an average density of 448.4 per square mile (173.1/km^{2}). Of the housing units, 9.1% were vacant; the homeowner vacancy rate was 3.7% and the rental vacancy rate was 13.1%.

The median age was 39.6 years. 25.2% of residents were under the age of 18 and 19.9% were 65 years of age or older. 27.1% of residents were under the age of 20; 5.9% were between the ages of 20 and 24; 23.2% were from 25 to 44; and 23.8% were from 45 to 64. The gender makeup of the city was 48.5% male and 51.5% female. For every 100 females, there were 94.0 males, and for every 100 females age 18 and over, there were 90.6 males.

94.9% of residents lived in urban areas, while 5.1% lived in rural areas.

Of the 935 households, 30.3% had children under the age of 18 living with them. Of all households, 45.8% were married-couple households, 7.0% were cohabiting-couple households, 29.1% had a female householder with no spouse or partner present, and 18.2% had a male householder with no spouse or partner present. 35.3% of households were non-families. 31.8% of all households were made up of individuals, and 15.3% had someone living alone who was 65 years of age or older.

Racial composition as of the 2020 census
Race	Number	Percent
White	1,726	72.9%
Black or African American	45	1.9%
American Indian and Alaska Native	159	6.7%
Asian	20	0.8%
Native Hawaiian and Other Pacific Islander	0	0.0%
Some other race	203	8.6%
Two or more races	216	9.1%
Hispanic or Latino (of any race)	440	18.6%

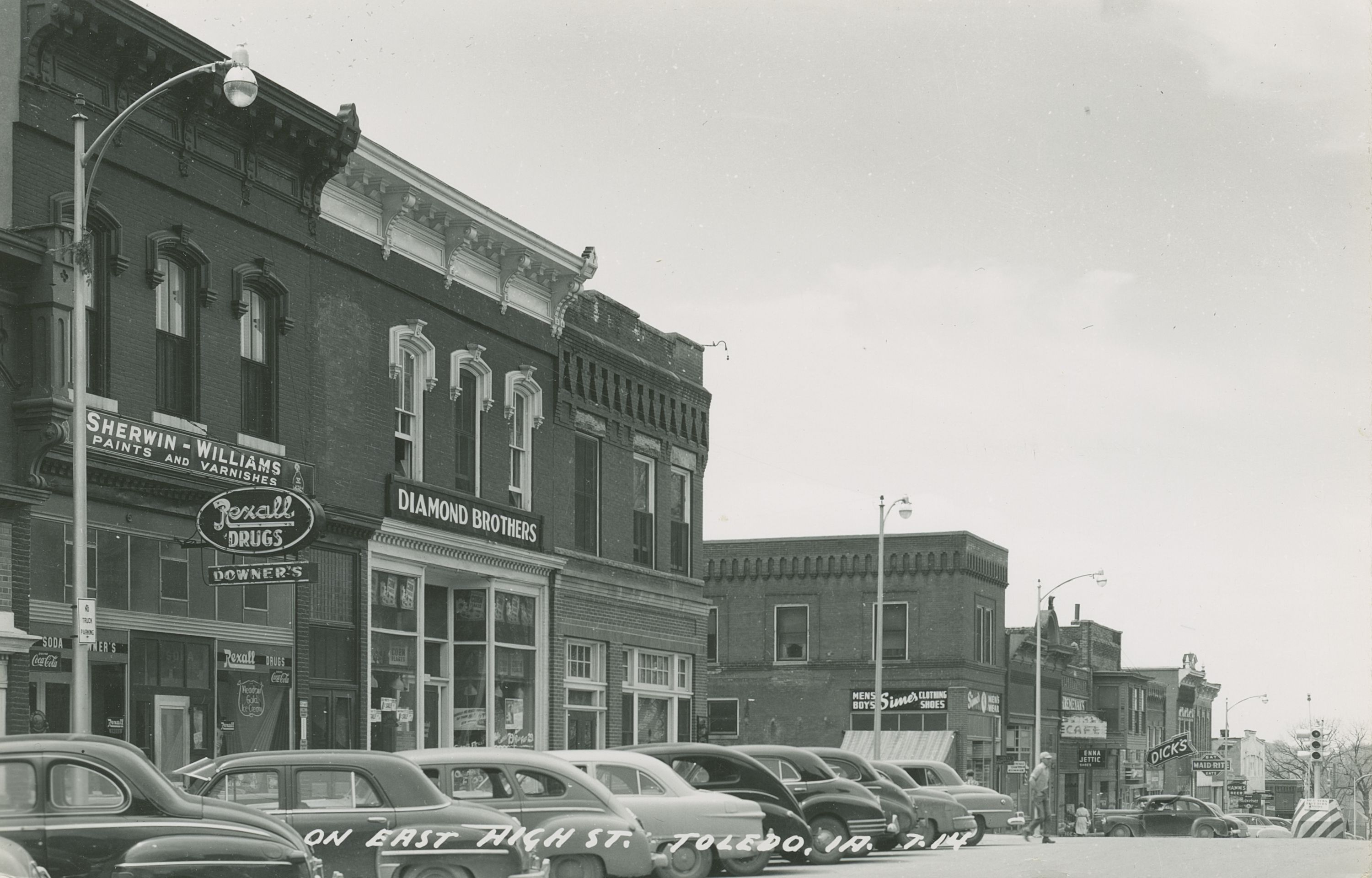
Main Street, 1950

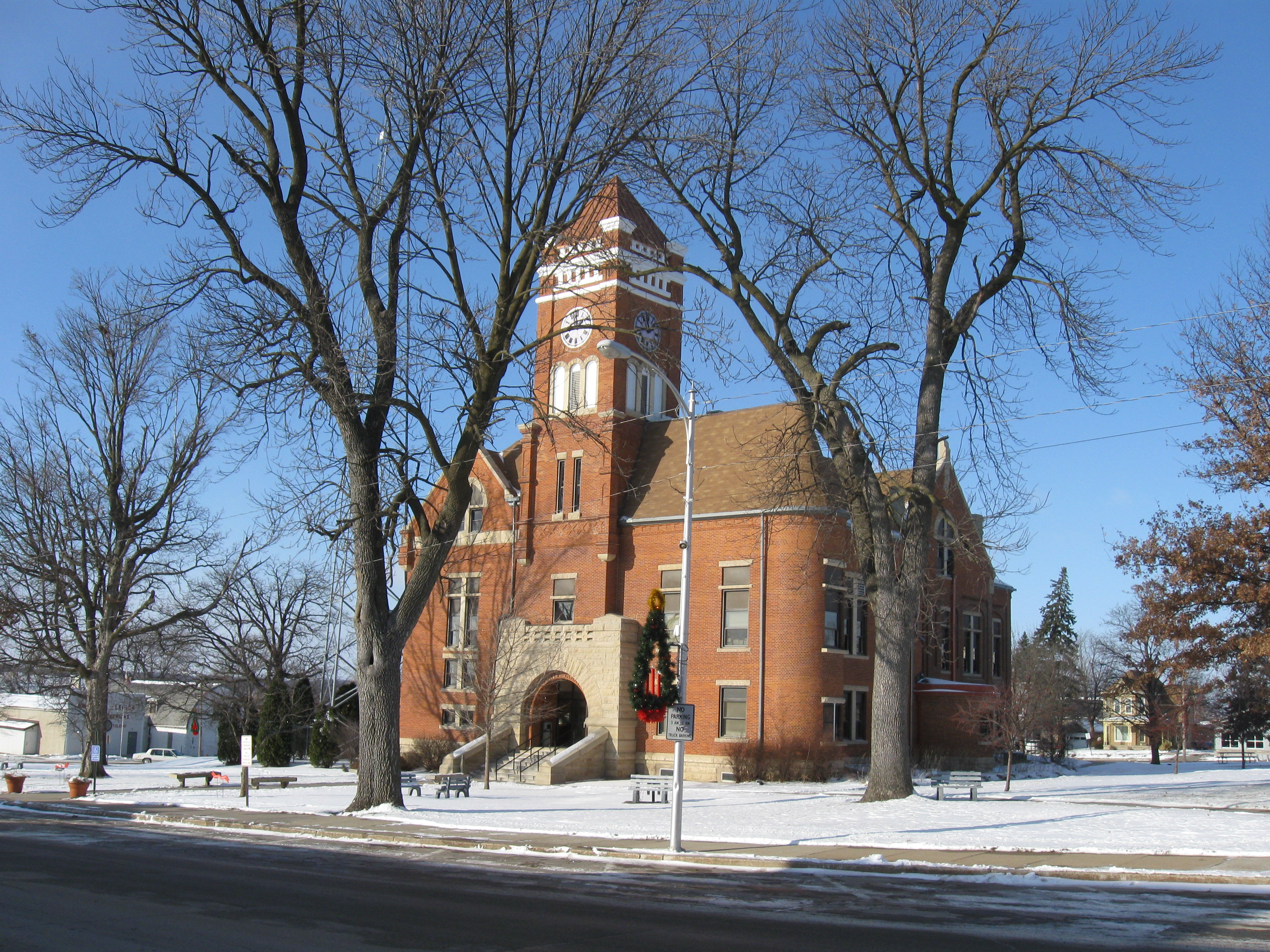
Tama County Courthouse in Toledo

=== 2010 census ===
As of the census of 2010, there were 2,341 people, 901 households, and 598 families living in the city. The population density was 1,017.8 inhabitants per square mile (393.0/km^{2}). There were 993 housing units at an average density of 431.7 per square mile (166.7/km^{2}). The racial makeup of the city was 83.5% White, 1.1% African American, 5.8% Native American, 0.6% Asian, 4.3% from other races, and 4.8% from two or more races. Hispanic or Latino of any race were 11.4% of the population.

There were 901 households, of which 31.5% had children under the age of 18 living with them, 51.4% were married couples living together, 10.5% had a female householder with no husband present, 4.4% had a male householder with no wife present, and 33.6% were non-families. 28.3% of all households were made up of individuals, and 13.3% had someone living alone who was 65 years of age or older. The average household size was 2.43 and the average family size was 2.94.

The median age in the city was 40.3 years. 27.5% of residents were under the age of 18; 6.9% were between the ages of 18 and 24; 21.4% were from 25 to 44; 25.8% were from 45 to 64; and 18.3% were 65 years of age or older. The gender makeup of the city was 46.3% male and 53.7% female.

=== 2000 census ===
As of the census of 2000, there were 2,539 people, 982 households, and 632 families living in the city. The population density was 1,105.9 inhabitants per square mile (427.0/km^{2}). There were 1,050 housing units at an average density of 457.4 per square mile (176.6/km^{2}). The racial makeup of the city was 87.51% White, 0.51% African American, 5.83% Native American, 0.35% Asian, 0.04% Pacific Islander, 2.91% from other races, and 2.84% from two or more races. Hispanic or Latino of any race were 5.87% of the population.

There were 982 households, out of which 30.0% had children under the age of 18 living with them, 49.1% were married couples living together, 12.6% had a female householder with no husband present, and 35.6% were non-families. 30.8% of all households were made up of individuals, and 16.6% had someone living alone who was 65 years of age or older. The average household size was 2.36 and the average family size was 2.93.

Age spread: 27.4% under the age of 18, 8.7% from 18 to 24, 24.4% from 25 to 44, 20.1% from 45 to 64, and 19.4% who were 65 years of age or older. The median age was 38 years. For every 100 females, there were 84.8 males. For every 100 females age 18 and over, there were 81.9 males.

The median income for a household in the city was $33,750, and the median income for a family was $40,833. Males had a median income of $30,273 versus $22,349 for females. The per capita income for the city was $16,293. About 8.5% of families and 11.0% of the population were below the poverty line, including 17.9% of those under age 18 and 7.0% of those age 65 or over.

== Economy ==
The Iowa Department of Human Services operated the Iowa Juvenile Home in Toledo until its closing in 2014. The buildings sat empty until 2023 when the cottages were demolished to make way for the new South Tama Middle School. The new Middle School is set to be completed in 2025.

== Arts and culture ==
Each summer, the annual Stoplight Festival takes place on the town square. The celebration surrounds the historic stoplight located at the intersection of High Street and Broadway.

The Wieting Theatre is located in downtown Toledo, one block east of the stoplight and the Tama County Courthouse square, at 101 South Church Street. Since 1960 the theatre has been maintained and operated by the Wieting Theatre Guild, a nonprofit organization of members and volunteers dedicated to keeping the doors of this grand old theatre open for many years to come. Movies play on most Friday, Saturday and Sunday evenings throughout the year. Actors, musicians, singers and dancers of all ages take the stage on numerous other occasions.

== Parks and recreation ==
Toledo Heights sits on the west side of town. The park has two fields which are used for little-league baseball and softball. The park has a playground and a large picnic shelter. Surrounding the park is an 18-hole disc golf course. The South Tama Recreation Trail is accessible near Toledo Heights. The gravel trail covers just under 3 miles and continues into Tama.

== Education ==
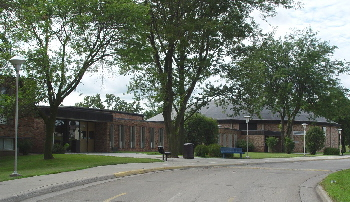
South Tama County High School

Toledo is within the South Tama County Community School District. The district includes a class 3A high school that enrolls over 430 students, a middle school, and an elementary school that has over 700 students.

Toledo is home to the South Tama County Middle School.

== Notable people ==
- Leander Clark, Iowa politician
- King Cole, baseball pitcher, gave up Babe Ruth's first hit
- W. K. Davidson (1904-1974), Illinois businessman and state legislator
- Michael Emerson, actor
- Norma 'Duffy' Lyon (1929–2011) sculptor nicknamed the "Butter Cow Lady"
- George R. Struble, Iowa judge and politician; speaker of the Iowa House of Representatives, 1881–1883
- John T. Struble, pioneering businessman
- Isaac S. Struble, U.S. Representative
- John L. Waller, Politician and Consul to Madagascar (1891)
