= South Tama County High School =

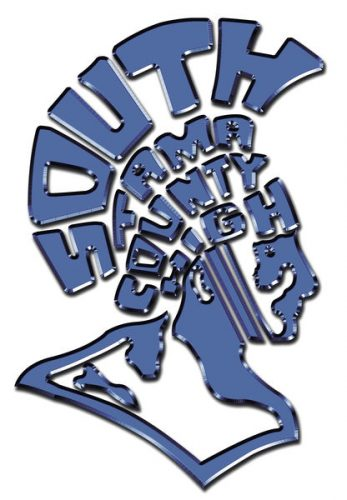

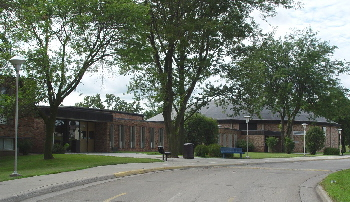
- South Tama High School in 2010

Location
- 1715 Harding Street; Tama, Iowa 52339; United States; 41.97663°N 92.58322°W

Information
- Type: Public high school
- Established: 1962
- School district: South Tama County Community School District
- Superintendent: John Cain
- Principal: Robert Boley
- Teaching staff: 27.06 (FTE)
- Grades: 9–12
- Enrollment: 448 (2023-2024)
- Student to teacher ratio: 16.56
- Colors: Columbia Blue, White, & Black
- Athletics conference: WaMaC Conference
- Sports: football; volleyball; cross country; golf; tennis; soccer; track; wrestling; softball; baseball; marching band
- Mascot: Troy the Trojan
- Team name: Trojans
- Rival: Grinnell Community High School Tigers
- Newspaper: Blue Crush
- Yearbook: The Iliad
- Website: hs-southtama.schoolblocks.com

South Tama County High School is a public high school located in Tama, Iowa. The school serves 472 students within the grades of 9th to 12th.

== History ==
After the 1962 consolidation of Tama, Toledo, Iowa, Montour, Iowa, Chelsea, Iowa, Vining, Iowa schools, the high school was called just, "Tama-Toledo" or "T-T" for short. Tama and Toledo had separate buildings from before the consolidation, but still was considered as one high school. This would change after the current high school building was built in 1968. It held 10th to 12th grade and 9th was kept at the Toledo building (Current STC Middle School) with 8th and 7th grades. The Tama building served as many things but was an intermediate school for many years until the current elementary school was built in 2006.

In 2017, a new addition was added behind the school. It replaced the portable classrooms the district had for many years. It also gave more space for the fine arts department, such as theatre, instrumental music, vocal, etc. This addition also gave new classrooms for the math and science departments and a commons area.

== Activities & Athletics ==
Athletics students compete in under the WaMaC Conference include, baseball, softball, bowling (with Marshalltown High School), basketball (boys & girls), soccer (boys and girls), swimming (with Marshalltown), golf (boys and girls), tennis (boys and girls), wrestling (boys and girls), volleyball, and football.

Other activities include, speech (large and individual), thespians, marching band, concert band, pep band, jazz band, choir, National Honor Society, cheerleading, and numerous clubs.

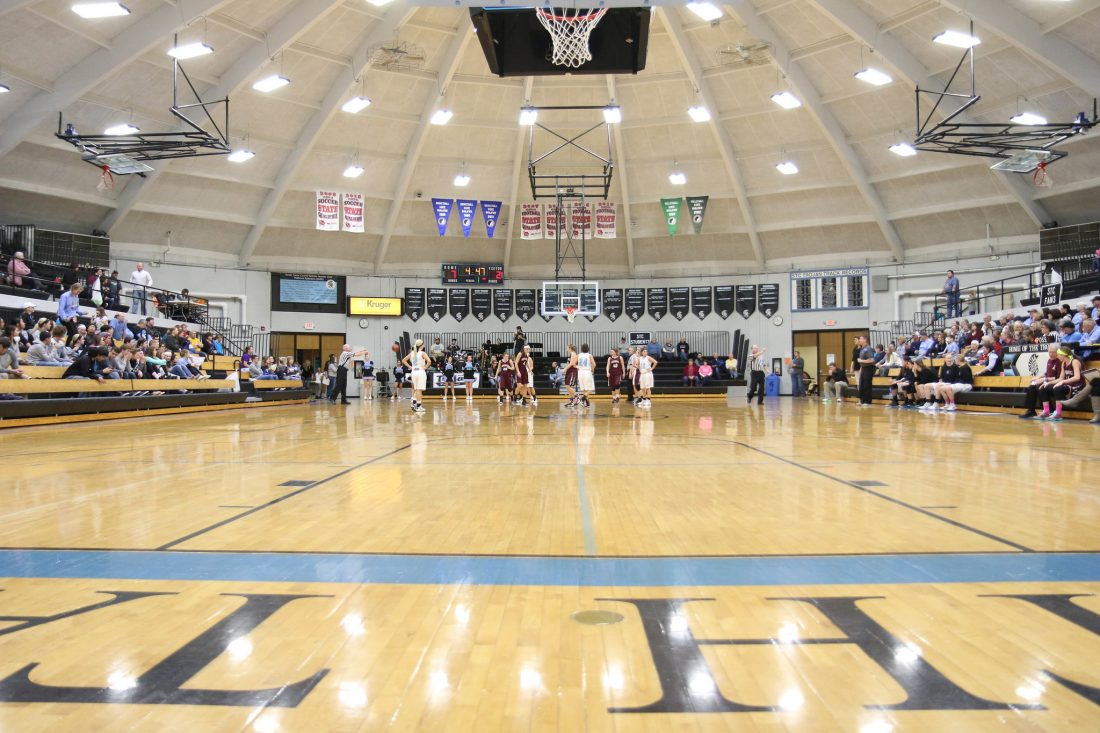
A basketball game at South Tama High School’s Roundhouse (gym)

== See also ==
- List of high schools in Iowa
- South Tama County Community School District
