= Toledo Township =

Toledo Township may refer to the following townships in the United States:

- Toledo Township, Tama County, Iowa
- Toledo Township, Chase County, Kansas
