= Elberon =

Elberon may refer to a place in the United States:

- Elberon, Iowa, a city with a population of about 200 in Tama County
- Elberon, New Jersey, a section of Long Branch, a city of 31,000 in Monmouth County
