= Carlton Town =

Carlton Town could refer to

- Carlton Town, North Yorkshire, a civil parish in North Yorkshire, England
- Carlton Town F.C. a semi-professional football team in Nottinghamshire, England.

== See also ==
- Carlton Township (disambiguation)
