= Green Mountain train wreck =

1910 railway incident in Iowa, United States

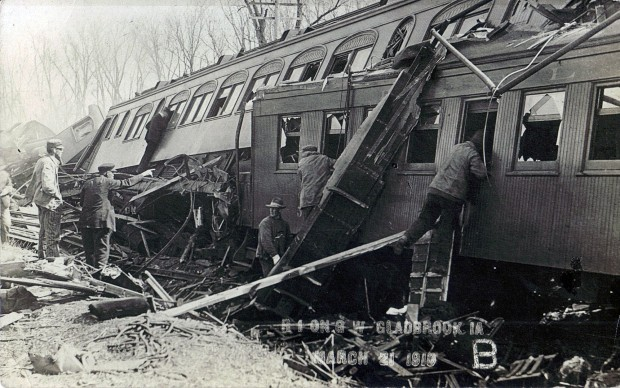
- Telescoping of the wooden coaches

Details
- Date: March 21, 1910; 116 years ago 8 am
- Location: Spring Creek Township, Tama County, Iowa, between Green Mountain and Gladbrook
- Coordinates: 42°9′53″N 92°46′00″W
- Country: United States
- Line: Chicago Great Western Railway
- Operator: Rock Island Line
- Incident type: Derailment
- Cause: Undetermined

Statistics
- Trains: 1
- Deaths: 52

The Green Mountain train wreck is the worst ever railroad accident in the state of Iowa. It occurred between Green Mountain and Gladbrook on the morning of March 21, 1910, and killed 52 people.

A train wreck earlier that morning at Shellsburg meant that the Rock Island Line trains were being diverted from Cedar Rapids to Waterloo over Chicago Great Western tracks via Marshalltown. The trains concerned were the No. 21 St Louis-Twin Cities and No. 19 Chicago-Twin Cities; which had been combined into an 11 car train with the two locomotives traveling backwards, tender first. The new combined train now had two wooden cars sandwiched between the locomotives, a steel Pullman car, and other steel cars.

Between Green Mountain and Gladbrook, just east of the Marshall County border, the lead engine left the tracks and hit a clay embankment coming to a sudden stop. The two wooden coaches: a smoking car and a ladies' day coach containing many children were crushed against the back of the Pullman Sleeper. There were fatalities in the Pullman cars. One of the uninjured passengers said, "I saw women in the coach crushed into a bleeding mass, their bodies twisted out of human shape. I have seen what I shall see all my life when I dream." A relief train arrived two hours after the accident. It was later reported, "The sight was one of horribly crushed, mutilated, and dismembered bodies."

== Victims ==
On the day after the wreck, the New York Times reported 46 dead (45 in the main headline, 46 in the continuation on page 2). The Times identified 36 names, adding that "ten are so badly disfigured that their identity cannot be discovered.

== Legacy ==
No official cause was ever released for the wreck, nor were any charges of neglect made although the crash did result in the introduction of new safety procedures.
