= Gladbrook, Iowa =

- City
- Location of Gladbrook, Iowa
- Coordinates: 42°11′10″N 92°42′54″W
- Country: United States
- State: Iowa
- County: Tama

Area
  - Total: 0.70 sq mi (1.81 km^{2})
  - Land: 0.70 sq mi (1.81 km^{2})
  - Water: 0 sq mi (0.00 km^{2})
- Elevation: 978 ft (298 m)

Population (2020)
  - Total: 799
  - Density: 1,146.0/sq mi (442.48/km^{2})
- Time zone: UTC-6 (Central (CST))
  - Summer (DST): UTC-5 (CDT)
- ZIP code: 50635
- Area code: 641
- FIPS code: 19-31035
- GNIS feature ID: 2394905
- Website: www.gladbrook.org

Gladbrook is a city in Tama County, Iowa, United States. As of 2023, its population is 767 people.

== History ==
A post office called Gladbrook has been in operation since 1880. The name Gladbrook was coined by a railroad official.

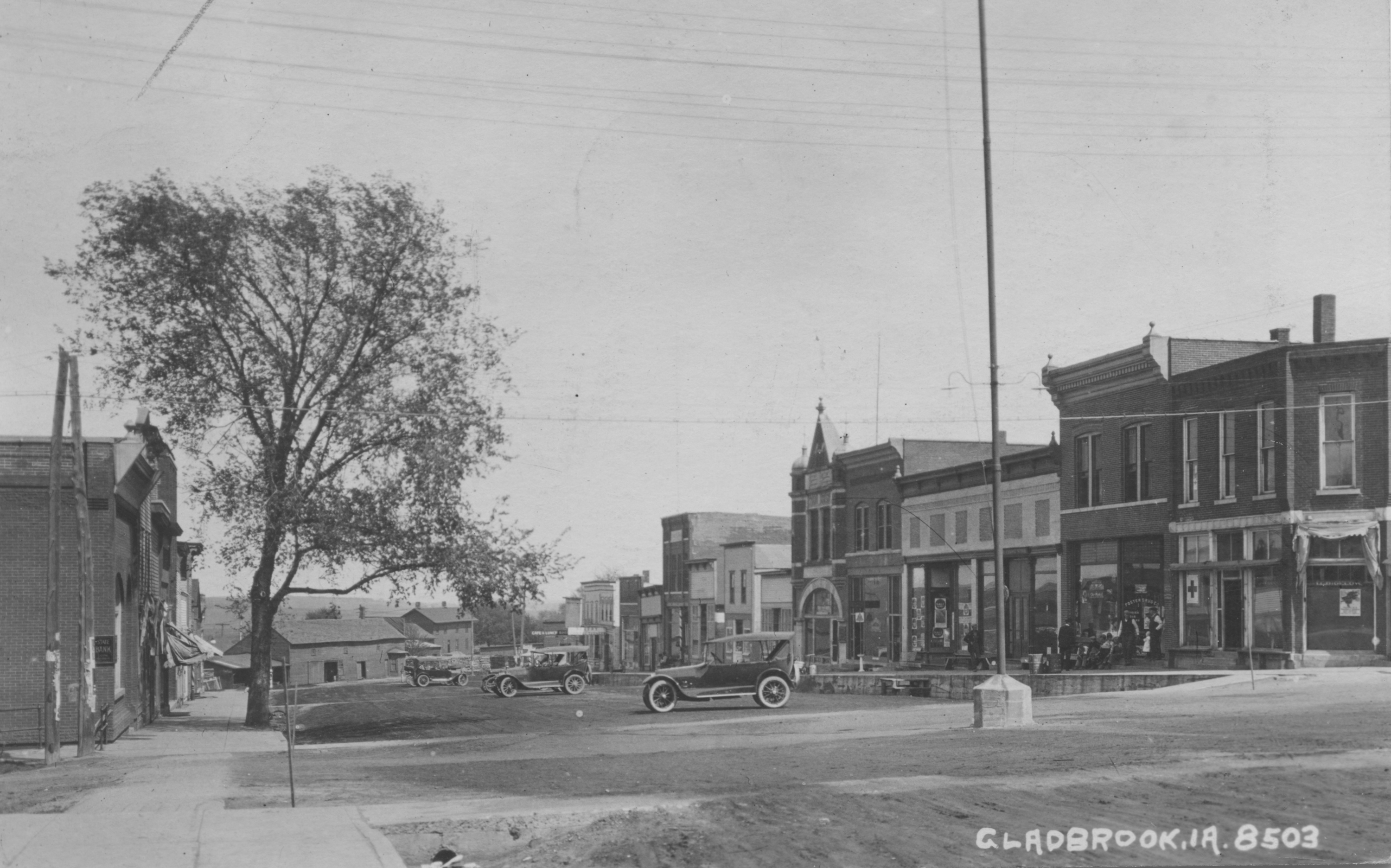
Main Street, 1920

On March 21, 1910, the Green Mountain train wreck occurred between Gladbrook and Green Mountain, in which a derailment killed more than 50 people riding on the Chicago, Rock Island and Pacific Railroad line.

== Geography ==
According to the United States Census Bureau, the city has a total area of 0.70 square miles (1.81 km^{2}), all land.

== Demographics ==
Historical populations
Year	Pop.	±%
1890	556	—
1900	842	+51.4%
1910	869	+3.2%
1920	961	+10.6%
1930	891	−7.3%
1940	945	+6.1%
1950	862	−8.8%
1960	949	+10.1%
1970	961	+1.3%
1980	970	+0.9%
1990	881	−9.2%
2000	1,015	+15.2%
2010	945	−6.9%
2020	799	−15.4%
2023	767	−4.0%
Source:"U.S. Census website". United States Census Bureau. and Iowa Data Center; Source: U.S. Decennial Census

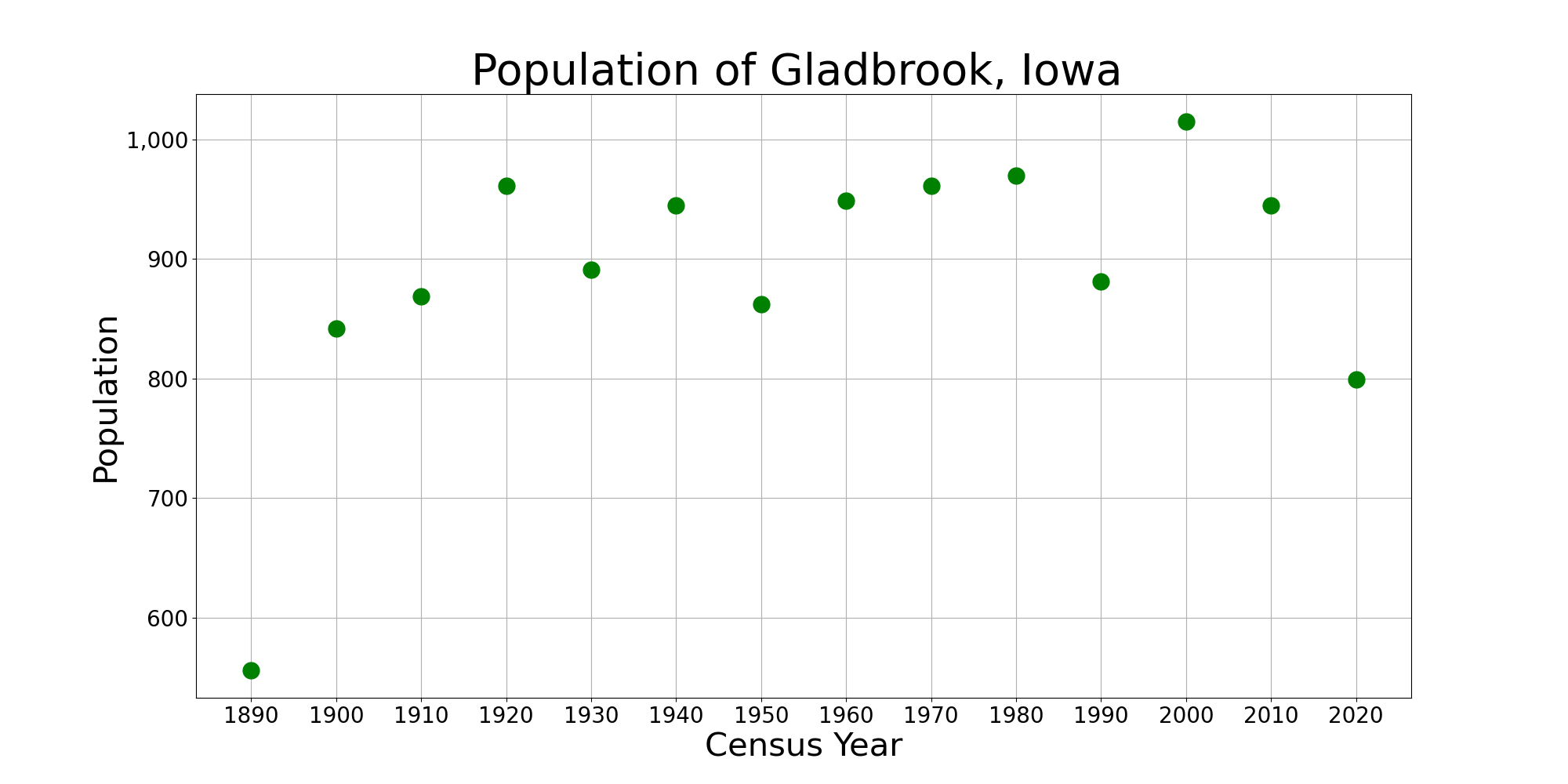
The population of Gladbrook, Iowa from US census data

=== 2020 census ===
As of the census of 2020, there were 799 people, 372 households, and 217 families residing in the city. The population density was 1,146.0 inhabitants per square mile (442.5/km^{2}). There were 437 housing units at an average density of 626.8 per square mile (242.0/km^{2}). The racial makeup of the city was 94.6% White, 0.3% Black or African American, 0.3% Native American, 0.5% Asian, 0.0% Pacific Islander, 1.3% from other races and 3.1% from two or more races. Hispanic or Latino persons of any race comprised 2.0% of the population.

Of the 372 households, 26.9% of which had children under the age of 18 living with them, 43.8% were married couples living together, 9.1% were cohabitating couples, 24.7% had a female householder with no spouse or partner present and 22.3% had a male householder with no spouse or partner present. 41.7% of all households were non-families. 34.9% of all households were made up of individuals, 17.7% had someone living alone who was 65 years old or older.

The median age in the city was 44.9 years. 22.7% of the residents were under the age of 20; 5.1% were between the ages of 20 and 24; 22.3% were from 25 and 44; 24.4% were from 45 and 64; and 25.5% were 65 years of age or older. The gender makeup of the city was 49.2% male and 50.8% female.

=== 2010 census ===
At the 2010 census, there were 945 people, 410 households and 251 families living in the city. The population density was 1,350.0 per square mile (521.2/km^{2}). There were 467 housing units at an average density of 667.1 per square mile (257.6/km^{2}). The racial make-up of the city was 98.8% White, 0.5% from other races, and 0.6% from two or more races. Hispanic or Latino of any race were 1.0% of the population.

There were 410 households, of which 25.1% had children under the age of 18 living with them, 50.7% were married couples living together, 7.1% had a female householder with no husband present, 3.4% had a male householder with no wife present, and 38.8% were non-families. 33.9% of all households were made up of individuals and 21.2% had someone living alone who was 65 years of age or older. The average household size was 2.19 and the average family size was 2.78.

The median age was 47.2 years. 20.2% of residents were under the age of 18, 6.1% were between the ages of 18 and 24, 20.7% were from 25 to 44, 25.7% were from 45 to 64 and 27.3% were 65 years of age or older. The sex make-up of the city was 45.3% male and 54.7% female.

=== 2000 census ===
At the 2000 census, there were 1,015 people, 408 households and 263 families living in the city. The population density was 1,456.9 per square mile (562.5/km^{2}). There were 437 housing units at an average density of 627.3 per square mile (242.2/km^{2}). The racial make-up of the city was 98.82% White, 0.10% African American, 0.49% Native American, 0.10% from other races and 0.49% from two or more races. Hispanic or Latino of any race were 0.89% of the population.

There were 408 households, of which 29.7% had children under the age of 18 living with them, 52.7% were married couples living together, 8.3% had a female householder with no husband present and 35.3% were non-families. 31.1% of all households were made up of individuals, and 21.3% had someone living alone who was 65 years of age or older. The average household size was 2.35 and the average family size was 2.91.

24.9% of the population were under the age of 18, 5.9% from 18 to 24, 24.2% from 25 to 44, 16.9% from 45 to 64 and 28.0% were 65 years of age or older. The median age was 42 years. For every 100 females, there were 79.3 males under 18. For every 100 females age 18 and over, there were 79.7 males.

The median household income was $38,167 and the median family income was $41,797. Males had a median income of $34,028 and females $21,161. The per capita income was $18,484. About 4.2% of families and 6.3% of the population were below the poverty line, including 11.3% of those under age 18 and 4.3% of those age 65 or over.

== Arts and culture ==
=== Annual cultural events ===
The Gladbrook Corn Carnival is an annual celebration that attracts several thousand visitors per year. It has been held since 1922, generally in the last weekend of June with a variety of events held from Thursday to Sunday.

=== Museums ===
Gladbrook is the site of the Matchstick Marvels Museum which holds large creations built by Patrick Acton that are made out of matchsticks. Many of his creations are displayed in Ripley's Believe It or Not! museums.

== Parks and recreation ==
Gladbrook has a movie theater, a 24-hour fitness center, and a bike and walking trail.

=== Union Grove Park ===
Union Grove State Park is located three miles south of Gladbrook. It has a public beach, several picnic areas, public fishing, campgrounds and short hiking trails.

== Education ==
The city is served by the Gladbrook–Reinbeck Community School District. Gladbrook Community School District consolidated on July 1, 1988. Students attend school in nearby Reinbeck. Previously there was an elementary and middle school in Gladbrook, but it closed in 2015.

== Notable person ==
- Clifford Berry, who helped John Vincent Atanasoff to create the first digital electronic computer in 1939, the Atanasoff–Berry Computer at Iowa State, was born here.
