= Columbia Township, Tama County, Iowa =

Township in Iowa, United States

Coordinates: 41.911258°N 92.599325°W

Location of Columbia Township in Tama County

Columbia Township is one of the twenty-one townships of Tama County, Iowa, United States.

== History ==
Columbia Township was organized in 1856.
