= South Tama County Community School District =

Public school district in Tama, Iowa, United States

Coordinates: 41.975857°N 92.581311°W

Location
- Tama, Iowa Tama and Poweshiek counties United States
- Coordinates: 41.975857, -92.581311

District information
- Type: Local school district
- Grades: K-12
- Superintendent: John Cain
- Schools: 3
- Budget: $25,612,000 (2020-21)
- NCES District ID: 1926730

Students and staff
- Students: 1488 (2022-23)
- Teachers: 103.45 FTE
- Staff: 121.96 FTE
- Student–teacher ratio: 14.38
- Athletic conference: WaMaC Conference
- District mascot: Trojans
- Colors: Columbia Blue and White

Other information
- Website: www.s-tama.k12.ia.us

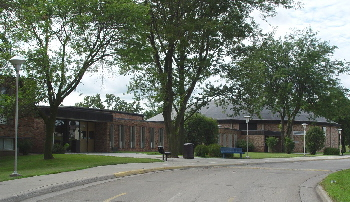
South Tama County High School

South Tama County Community School District (STC) is a rural public school district headquartered in Tama, Iowa.

== Service area ==
The district has a total of 262 square miles (680 km^{2}) of area. Almost all of the district is in Tama County while a small portion is in Poweshiek County. The district serves, in addition to Tama, Chelsea, Montour, Toledo, and Vining. It also serves the Meskwaki Settlement, a Native American settlement, and other areas. Typically, Meskwaki Nation students attend the Meskwaki Settlement School and move on to South Tama County High School.

== History ==
In July 2018, Jared Smith became the superintendent. He previously was the principal of Muscatine High School. He received a two-year contract renewal in February 2020.

In 2020, there was a vote to pass a school bond that would rebuild the middle school as an attachment to the high school building in Tama, which would mean the end of use of the Toledo building. Unofficial results as of March 6, 2020, stated that the vote was 53.9% in favor by a margin of 844–722; it failed due to the percentage of voters being below the required 60%. There was opposition from figures who believed that the district did not give sufficient details about the project.

Later that month the district considered another vote.

In August 2019, the middle school suffered a minor fire. A few classrooms sustained minor damage and repairs were complete before the school year began. In January 2026, the school district partnered with other institutions in the Cedar Falls area to lobby for increased funding. A school committee member complained that subsidies had been diverted since the establishment of a start-up Christian school in the district.

== Enrollment ==
As of 2020, the district as a whole had over 1,500 students.

== Schools ==
- South Tama County Elementary, Tama
- South Tama County Middle School, Toledo
- South Tama County High School, Tama

=== South Tama County High School ===
==== Athletics ====
The Trojans compete in the WaMaC Conference in the following sports:

- Baseball
- Basketball (boys and girls)
- Bowling
- Cross Country (boys and girls)
- Football
- Golf (boys and girls)
  - Girls' Class 2A State Champions - 1998
- Soccer (boys and girls)
- Softball
- Swimming (boys and girls)
- Tennis (boys and girls)
- Track and Field (boys and girls)
- Volleyball
- Wrestling

== See also ==
- List of school districts in Iowa
- List of high schools in Iowa
