= Howard Township, Tama County, Iowa =

Township in Tama County, Iowa, U.S.

Coordinates: 42.072017°N 92.598982°W

Location of Howard Township in Tama County

Howard Township is one of the twenty-one townships of Tama County, Iowa, United States.
