= Grant Township, Tama County, Iowa =

Township in Tama County, Iowa, U.S.

Coordinates: 42.268074°N 92.600355°W

Location of Grant Township in Tama County

Grant Township is one of the twenty-one townships of Tama County, Iowa, United States.

== History ==
Grant Township was organized in 1868. It is named for Ulysses S. Grant.
