= Carlton Township =

Carlton Township may refer to the following townships in the United States:

- Carlton Township, Tama County, Iowa
- Carlton Township, Michigan
