= Lincoln, Iowa =

- City
- Location of Lincoln, Iowa
- Coordinates: 42°15′46″N 92°41′32″W
- Country: United States
- State: Iowa
- County: Tama

Government
  - Mayor: Trent Wentzien

Area
  - Total: 0.56 sq mi (1.45 km^{2})
  - Land: 0.56 sq mi (1.45 km^{2})
  - Water: 0 sq mi (0.00 km^{2})
- Elevation: 1,060 ft (320 m)

Population (2020)
  - Total: 121
  - Density: 215.6/sq mi (83.25/km^{2})
- Time zone: UTC-6 (Central (CST))
  - Summer (DST): UTC-5 (CDT)
- ZIP code: 50652
- Area code: 641
- FIPS code: 19-45255
- GNIS feature ID: 2395711

Lincoln is a city in Tama County, Iowa, United States. The population was 121 at the time of the 2020 census. The community was known as Berlin until June 12, 1918.

== History ==
Lincoln was founded by Charles Spencer and bore a number of short-lived names before adopting Berlin. The community had a population of 61 in 1902.

Berlin incorporated as a city on September 10, 1913. After the outbreak of World War I, Berlin's many German residents faced verbal and physical abuses as part of the wave of anti-German sentiment that swept the country. On June 12, 1918, Berlin officially changed its name to Lincoln.

== Geography ==
According to the United States Census Bureau, the city has a total area of 0.46 square miles (1.19 km^{2}), all land.

== Demographics ==
Historical populations
Year	Pop.	±%
1920	146	—
1930	162	+11.0%
1940	167	+3.1%
1950	194	+16.2%
1960	183	−5.7%
1970	184	+0.5%
1980	202	+9.8%
1990	173	−14.4%
2000	182	+5.2%
2010	162	−11.0%
2020	121	−25.3%
Source:"U.S. Census website". United States Census Bureau. and Iowa Data Center; Source: U.S. Decennial Census

=== 2020 census ===
As of the census of 2020, there were 121 people, 60 households, and 41 families residing in the city. The population density was 215.6 inhabitants per square mile (83.2/km^{2}). There were 75 housing units at an average density of 133.6 per square mile (51.6/km^{2}). The racial makeup of the city was 91.7% White, 0.0% Black or African American, 0.0% Native American, 0.0% Asian, 0.0% Pacific Islander, 0.8% from other races and 7.4% from two or more races. Hispanic or Latino persons of any race comprised 9.1% of the population.

Of the 60 households, 30.0% of which had children under the age of 18 living with them, 46.7% were married couples living together, 15.0% were cohabitating couples, 16.7% had a female householder with no spouse or partner present and 21.7% had a male householder with no spouse or partner present. 31.7% of all households were non-families. 25.0% of all households were made up of individuals, 10.0% had someone living alone who was 65 years old or older.

The median age in the city was 47.8 years. 24.0% of the residents were under the age of 20; 2.5% were between the ages of 20 and 24; 15.7% were from 25 and 44; 34.7% were from 45 and 64; and 23.1% were 65 years of age or older. The gender makeup of the city was 48.8% male and 51.2% female.

=== 2010 census ===
As of the census of 2010, there were 162 people, 68 households, and 47 families residing in the city. The population density was 352.2 inhabitants per square mile (136.0/km^{2}). There were 81 housing units at an average density of 176.1 per square mile (68.0/km^{2}). The racial makeup of the city was 99.4% White and 0.6% from two or more races. Hispanic or Latino of any race were 4.3% of the population.

There were 68 households, of which 27.9% had children under the age of 18 living with them, 52.9% were married couples living together, 11.8% had a female householder with no husband present, 4.4% had a male householder with no wife present, and 30.9% were non-families. 27.9% of all households were made up of individuals, and 7.4% had someone living alone who was 65 years of age or older. The average household size was 2.38 and the average family size was 2.91.

The median age in the city was 39.3 years. 28.4% of residents were under the age of 18; 7.5% were between the ages of 18 and 24; 20.4% were from 25 to 44; 32.2% were from 45 to 64; and 11.7% were 65 years of age or older. The gender makeup of the city was 50.0% male and 50.0% female.

=== 2000 census ===
As of the census of 2000, there were 182 people, 75 households, and 51 families residing in the city. The population density was 396.3 inhabitants per square mile (153.0/km^{2}). There were 90 housing units at an average density of 195.9 per square mile (75.6/km^{2}). The racial makeup of the city was 98.35% White, 1.65% from other races. Hispanic or Latino of any race were 1.65% of the population.

There were 75 households, out of which 29.3% had children under the age of 18 living with them, 61.3% were married couples living together, 6.7% had a female householder with no husband present, and 30.7% were non-families. 28.0% of all households were made up of individuals, and 18.7% had someone living alone who was 65 years of age or older. The average household size was 2.43 and the average family size was 2.92.

In the city, the population was spread out, with 25.8% under the age of 18, 6.0% from 18 to 24, 26.4% from 25 to 44, 19.2% from 45 to 64, and 22.5% who were 65 years of age or older. The median age was 40 years. For every 100 females, there were 93.6 males. For every 100 females age 18 and over, there were 95.7 males.

The median income for a household in the city was $33,750, and the median income for a family was $39,750. Males had a median income of $28,250 versus $22,000 for females. The per capita income for the city was $14,313. About 13.7% of families and 15.5% of the population were below the poverty line, including 26.3% of those under the age of eighteen and 7.1% of those 65 or over.

== Education ==
The city is served by the Gladbrook–Reinbeck Community School District.
