= Otter Creek Township, Tama County, Iowa =

Township in Tama County, Iowa, U.S.

Coordinates: 41°59′33″N 92°28′27″W

Location of Otter Creek Township in Tama County

Otter Creek Township is one of the twenty-one townships of Tama County, Iowa, United States.

== History ==
Otter Creek Township was organized in 1856.
