= Carroll Township, Tama County, Iowa =

Township in Iowa, United States

Coordinates: 42.073928°N 92.478991°W

Location of Carroll Township in Tama County

Carroll Township is one of the twenty-one townships of Tama County, Iowa, United States.

== History ==
Carroll Township was established in 1857.
