= Highland Township, Tama County, Iowa =

Township in Tama County, Iowa, U.S.

Coordinates: 41.910364°N 92.718287°W

Location of Highland Township in Tama County

Highland Township is one of the twenty-one townships of Tama County, Iowa, United States.
