= Tama County, Iowa =

County in Iowa, United States

- County
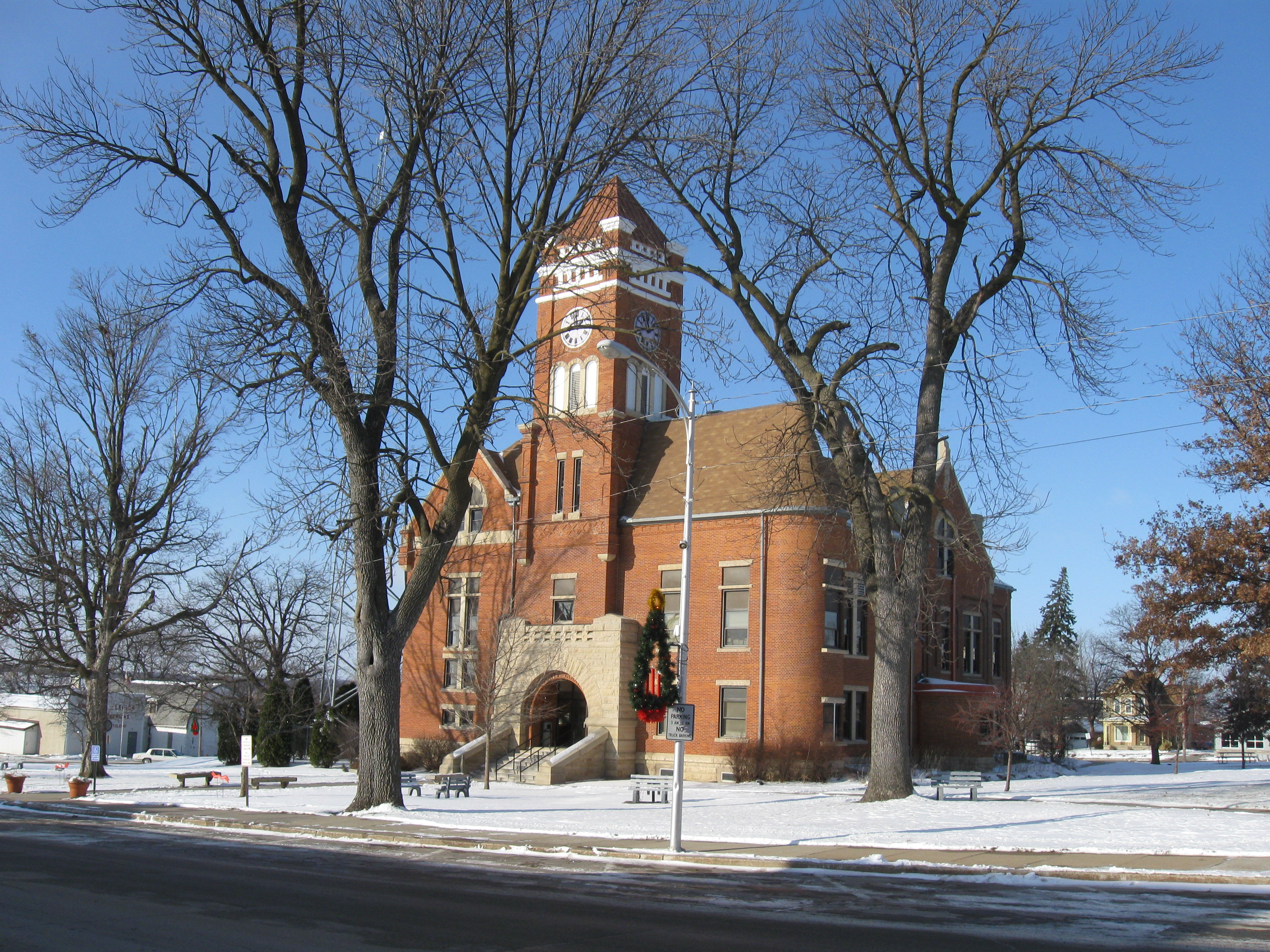
- The Tama County Courthouse in Toledo

- Location within the U.S. state of Iowa
- Coordinates: 42°04′43″N 92°31′53″W
- Country: United States
- State: Iowa
- Founded: February 17, 1843
- Named for: Taimah
- Seat: Toledo
- Largest city: Tama

Area
  - Total: 722 sq mi (1,870 km^{2})
  - Land: 721 sq mi (1,870 km^{2})
  - Water: 1.1 sq mi (2.8 km^{2}) 0.1%

Population (2020)
  - Total: 17,135
  - Estimate (2025): 16,796 ▼
  - Density: 23.8/sq mi (9.18/km^{2})
- Time zone: UTC−6 (Central)
  - Summer (DST): UTC−5 (CDT)
- Congressional district: 2nd
- Website: www.tamacounty.iowa.gov
- Iowa county number 86

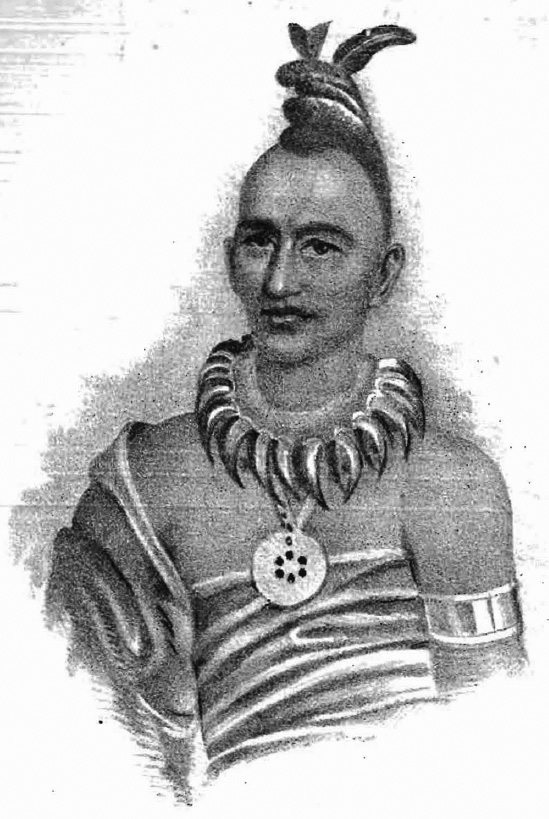
Taimah, from A.R. Fulton's Red Men of Iowa 1882

Tama County /ˈteɪmə/ is a county located in the U.S. state of Iowa. As of the 2020 census, the population was 17,135. The county seat is Toledo and the largest city is Tama.

== History ==
Tama county was formed on February 17, 1843 and named for Taimah, a leader of the Meskwaki people.

== Geography ==
According to the United States Census Bureau, the county has a total area of 722 square miles (1,870 km^{2}), of which 721 square miles (1,870 km^{2}) is land and 1.1 square miles (2.8 km^{2}) (0.1%) is water.

=== Major highways ===
- U.S. Highway 30
- U.S. Highway 63
- Iowa Highway 8
- Iowa Highway 21
- Iowa Highway 96
- Iowa Highway 146

=== Adjacent counties ===
- Grundy County (northwest)
- Black Hawk County (northeast)
- Benton County (east)
- Poweshiek County (south)
- Marshall County (west)
- Iowa County (southeast)
- Jasper County (southwest)

== Demographics ==
Historical population
Census	Pop.	Note	%±
1850	8		—
1860	5,285		65,962.5%
1870	16,131		205.2%
1880	21,585		33.8%
1890	22,052		2.2%
1900	24,585		11.5%
1910	22,156		−9.9%
1920	21,861		−1.3%
1930	21,987		0.6%
1940	22,428		2.0%
1950	21,688		−3.3%
1960	21,413		−1.3%
1970	20,147		−5.9%
1980	19,533		−3.0%
1990	17,419		−10.8%
2000	18,103		3.9%
2010	17,767		−1.9%
2020	17,135		−3.6%
2025 (est.)	16,796	▼	−2.0%
U.S. Decennial Census; 1790–1960 1900–1990; 1990–2000 2010–2020

=== 2020 census ===
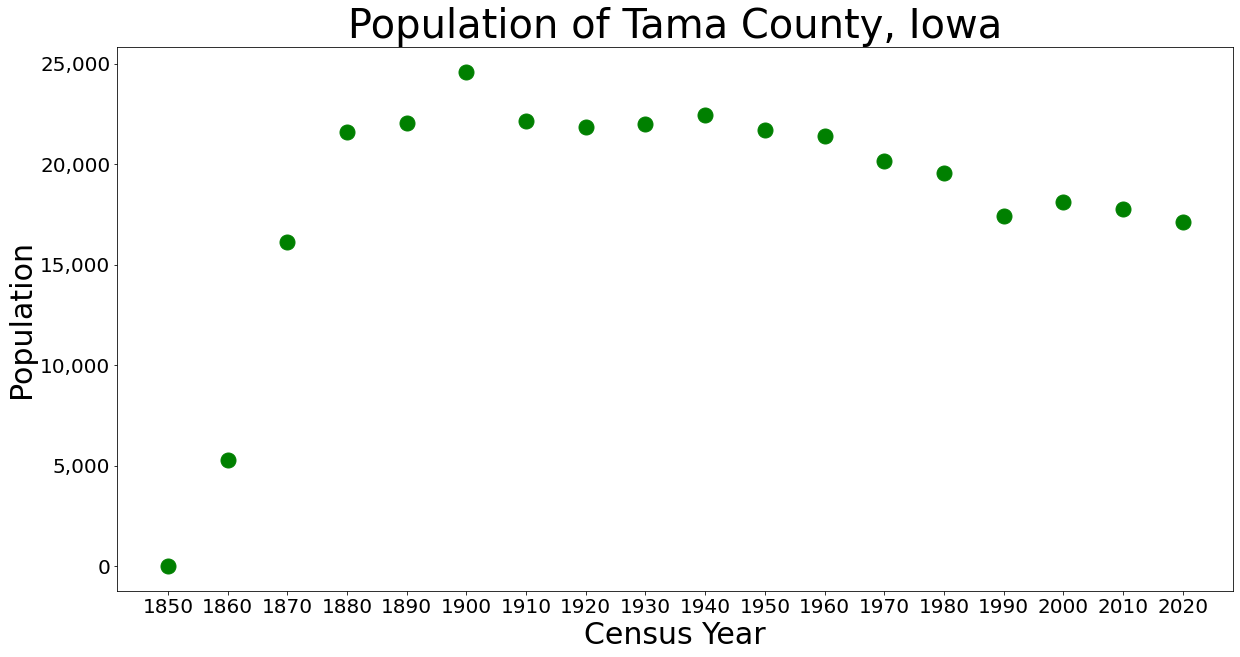
Population of Tama County from the U.S. census data

As of the 2020 census, the county had a population of 17,135 and a population density of 23.7/sq mi (9.2/km^{2}).

The median age was 42.0 years. 24.2% of residents were under the age of 18 and 20.7% of residents were 65 years of age or older. For every 100 females there were 98.6 males, and for every 100 females age 18 and over there were 97.1 males age 18 and over.

There were 6,784 households in the county, of which 29.6% had children under the age of 18 living in them. Of all households, 51.3% were married-couple households, 19.2% were households with a male householder and no spouse or partner present, and 22.5% were households with a female householder and no spouse or partner present. About 27.8% of all households were made up of individuals and 13.9% had someone living alone who was 65 years of age or older. There were 7,575 housing units, of which 10.4% were vacant. Among occupied housing units, 76.8% were owner-occupied and 23.2% were renter-occupied. The homeowner vacancy rate was 2.2% and the rental vacancy rate was 9.1%.

93.80% of residents reported being of one race. The racial makeup of the county was 79.7% White, 0.8% Black or African American, 8.3% American Indian and Alaska Native, 0.5% Asian, <0.1% Native Hawaiian and Pacific Islander, 4.5% from some other race, and 6.2% from two or more races. Hispanic or Latino residents of any race comprised 10.5% of the population.

30.7% of residents lived in urban areas, while 69.3% lived in rural areas.

Tama County Racial Composition
Race	Number	Percent
White (NH)	13,284	77.52%
Black or African American (NH)	125	0.73%
Native American (NH)	1,258	7.34%
Asian (NH)	80	0.5%
Pacific Islander (NH)	2	0.01%
Other/Mixed (NH)	582	3.4%
Hispanic or Latino	1,804	10.53%

=== 2010 census ===
As of the 2010 census recorded a population of 17,767 in the county, with a population density of 24.6/sq mi (9.5/km^{2}). There were 7,766 housing units, of which 6,947 were occupied.

=== 2000 census ===
As of the 2000 census, there were 17,767 people, 7,018 households, and 4,968 families residing in the county. The population density was 25 people per square mile (9.7 people/km^{2}). There were 7,583 housing units at an average density of 10 per square mile (3.9/km^{2}). The racial makeup of the county was 90.38% White, 0.25% Black or African American, 6.09% Native American, 0.18% Asian, 0.02% Pacific Islander, 1.90% from other races, and 1.18% from two or more races. 3.75% of the population were Hispanic or Latino of any race.

There were 7,018 households, out of which 31.60% had children under the age of 18 living with them, 59.20% were married couples living together, 8.00% had a female householder with no husband present, and 29.20% were non-families. 25.30% of all households were made up of individuals, and 13.70% had someone living alone who was 65 years of age or older. The average household size was 2.51 and the average family size was 3.01.

In the county, the population was spread out, with 26.60% under the age of 18, 7.00% from 18 to 24, 25.20% from 25 to 44, 22.50% from 45 to 64, and 18.70% who were 65 years of age or older. The median age was 39 years. For every 100 females there were 96.60 males. For every 100 females age 18 and over, there were 92.50 males.

The median income for a household in the county was $37,419, and the median income for a family was $43,646. Males had a median income of $30,723 versus $22,597 for females. The per capita income for the county was $17,097. About 7.60% of families and 10.50% of the population were below the poverty line, including 14.50% of those under age 18 and 9.40% of those age 65 or over.

== Education ==
School districts include:

- Belle Plaine Community School District
- Benton Community School District
- East Marshall Community School District
- GMG Community School District
- Gladbrook-Reinbeck Community School District
- Grundy Center Community School District
- North Tama County Community School District
- South Tama County Community School District
- Union Community School District

There is also a Bureau of Indian Education (BIE)-affiliated tribal school, Meskwaki Settlement School.

The largest of which is South Tama Community School District, at the 3A designation. Second largest is North Tama Community Schools. Lastly both GMG and Meskwaki Settlement School with an eight-man designation.

== Communities ==
=== Cities ===
- Chelsea
- Clutier
- Dysart
- Elberon
- Garwin
- Gladbrook
- Le Grand
- Lincoln
- Montour
- Tama
- Toledo
- Traer
- Vining

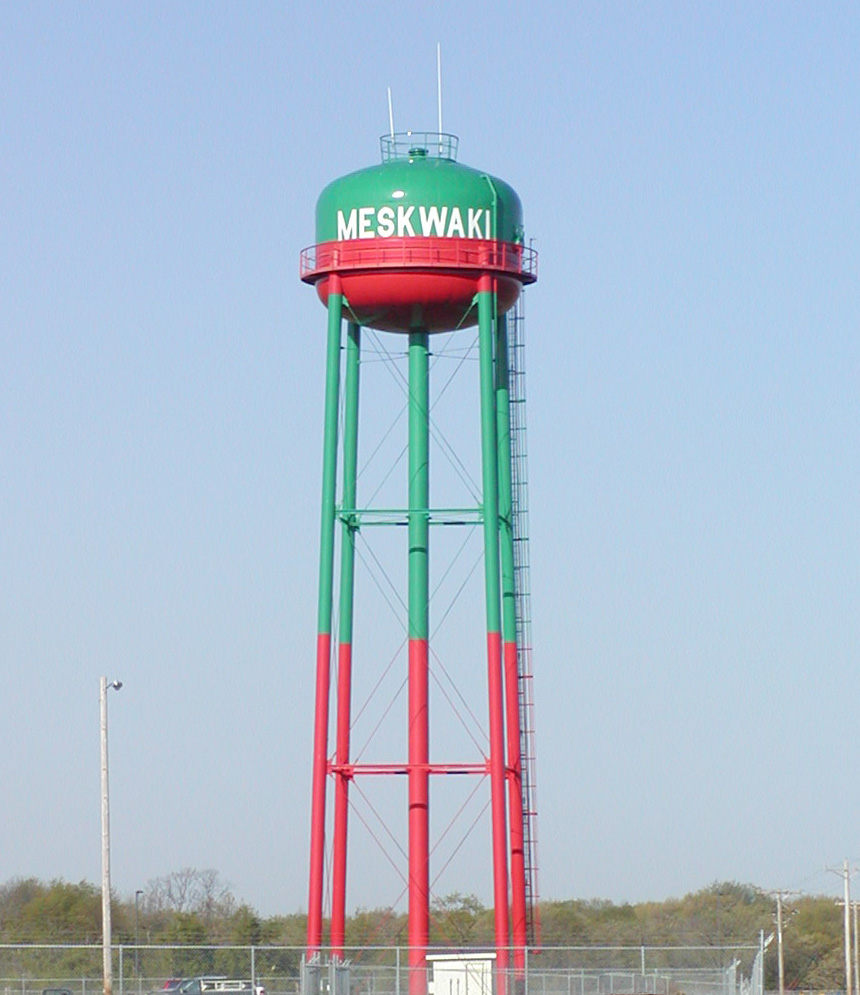
Meskwaki Settlement water tower

=== Unincorporated communities ===
- Buckingham
- Dinsdale
- Haven
- Long Point
- Meskwaki Settlement

=== Townships ===
Tama County is divided into twenty-one townships:

- Buckingham
- Carlton
- Carroll
- Clark
- Columbia
- Crystal
- Geneseo
- Grant
- Highland
- Howard
- Indian Village
- Lincoln
- Oneida
- Otter Creek
- Perry
- Richland
- Salt Creek
- Spring Creek
- Tama
- Toledo
- York

=== Population ranking ===
The population ranking of the following table is based on the 2020 census of Tama County.

† county seat

Rank	City/Town/etc.	Municipal type	Population (2020 Census)	Population (2024 Estimate)
1	Tama	City	3,130	3,125
2	† Toledo	City	2,369	2,376
3	Traer	City	1,583	1,599
4	Dysart	City	1,281	1,279
5	Sac and Fox/Meskwaki Settlement	AIAN	1,120	1,137
6	Le Grand (mostly in Marshall County)	City	905	891
7	Gladbrook	City	799	762
8	Garwin	City	481	480
9	Chelsea	City	229	216
10	Clutier	City	213	209
11	Montour	City	203	198
12	Elberon	City	184	185
13	Lincoln	City	121	127
14	Vining	City	54	62

== Notable people ==
- George R. Struble (1836–1918). Iowa judge and politician from Toledo. Speaker of the Iowa House of Representatives, 1881–1883. Ardent prohibitionist. Brother of John T. Struble of Johnson County, and Congressman Isaac S. Struble of Plymouth County. Biography in the Journal of the House, memorial resolution of March 23, 1921.
- Michael Emerson, born in Cedar Rapids and raised in Toledo, Emerson has been on Broadway and appeared on Lost.
- Clifford Berry (1918-1963), born in Gladbrook, was a graduate student at Iowa State when he and John Vincent Atanasoff created the Atanasoff–Berry Computer (ABC), the first digital electronic computer, in 1939.

== Politics ==
Between 1888 and 1984, Tama County was a reliable bellwether county, backing the nationwide winner in every presidential election except for 1916 and 1960. For the next seven election cycles, from 1988 to 2012, Tama County backed the Democratic candidate in each election, although George W. Bush came extremely close to winning the county in both 2000 and 2004, losing by slim margins of just 11 and 31 votes respectively. In 2016, Donald Trump moved the county back into the Republican camp, taking nearly 57% of the county's vote and winning it by more than 20%, the best margin in the county for any candidate since Ronald Reagan won the county during his 1980 landslide. Though Trump's margin of victory dropped slightly to just over 19% in 2020, he increased his vote share to almost 59%, the best vote share for a candidate of either party in Tama County since the 1964 landslide victory of Lyndon B. Johnson.

United States presidential election results for Tama County, Iowa
Year	Republican		Democratic		Third party(ies)	
Year	No.	%	No.	%	No.	%
1896	3,054	53.27%	2,596	45.28%	83	1.45%
1900	3,290	53.45%	2,736	44.45%	129	2.10%
1904	3,127	55.12%	2,360	41.60%	186	3.28%
1908	2,774	49.78%	2,550	45.76%	248	4.45%
1912	1,179	21.57%	2,446	44.76%	1,840	33.67%
1916	3,061	53.37%	2,572	44.85%	102	1.78%
1920	6,352	70.01%	2,552	28.13%	169	1.86%
1924	5,177	55.27%	2,180	23.27%	2,010	21.46%
1928	5,589	53.58%	4,798	45.99%	45	0.43%
1932	4,051	37.10%	6,704	61.39%	165	1.51%
1936	4,737	41.11%	6,625	57.50%	160	1.39%
1940	5,865	49.31%	5,996	50.42%	32	0.27%
1944	5,249	49.67%	5,286	50.02%	32	0.30%
1948	4,763	47.50%	5,115	51.01%	150	1.50%
1952	7,061	63.30%	4,076	36.54%	17	0.15%
1956	5,952	55.25%	4,795	44.51%	26	0.24%
1960	5,535	52.78%	4,950	47.21%	1	0.01%
1964	3,543	36.88%	6,057	63.04%	8	0.08%
1968	4,955	53.55%	3,767	40.71%	531	5.74%
1972	5,058	56.96%	3,693	41.59%	129	1.45%
1976	4,379	48.08%	4,580	50.29%	148	1.63%
1980	4,840	56.27%	3,049	35.45%	713	8.29%
1984	4,882	54.30%	4,061	45.17%	47	0.52%
1988	3,362	41.96%	4,584	57.21%	66	0.82%
1992	2,948	35.39%	3,573	42.89%	1,809	21.72%
1996	2,986	38.52%	3,994	51.52%	772	9.96%
2000	4,034	48.51%	4,045	48.65%	236	2.84%
2004	4,456	49.51%	4,487	49.85%	58	0.64%
2008	3,820	43.15%	4,899	55.34%	133	1.50%
2012	4,098	45.45%	4,768	52.88%	151	1.67%
2016	4,971	56.80%	3,196	36.52%	585	6.68%
2020	5,303	58.61%	3,577	39.53%	168	1.86%
2024	5,379	62.43%	3,070	35.63%	167	1.94%

== See also ==
- National Register of Historic Places listings in Tama County, Iowa
