= Salt Creek Township, Tama County, Iowa =

Township in Tama County, Iowa, U.S.

Coordinates: 41°54′24″N 92°21′25″W

Location of Salt Creek Township in Tama County

Salt Creek Township is one of the twenty-one townships of Tama County, Iowa, United States.

== History ==
Salt Creek Township was organized in 1856. It is named from the Salt Creek.
