= Lincoln Township, Tama County, Iowa =

Township in Tama County, Iowa, U.S.

Coordinates: 42°15′13″N 92°42′33″W

Location of Lincoln Township in Tama County

Lincoln Township is one of the twenty-one townships of Tama County, Iowa, United States.

== History ==
Lincoln Township was established in 1861. It was originally built up chiefly by Germans.
