= Long Point, Iowa =

- Unincorporated community
- Location within Iowa
- Coordinates: 41°56′43″N 92°29′02″W
- Country: United States
- State: Iowa
- County: Tama
- Elevation: 804 ft (245 m)
- Time zone: UTC-6 (Central (CST))
  - Summer (DST): UTC-5 (CDT)
- Area code: 641
- GNIS feature ID: 464627

Long Point is an unincorporated community in Tama County, in the U.S. state of Iowa.

== History ==
A post office was established at Long Point in 1890, and remained in operation until it was discontinued in 1920. The community was named from a long point on the nearby Iowa River. Long Point's population was 33 in 1902.
