= Indian Village Township, Tama County, Iowa =

Township in Tama County, Iowa, U.S.

Coordinates: 41.989009°N 92.718458°W

Location of Indian Village Township in Tama County

Indian Village Township is one of the twenty-one townships of Tama County, Iowa, United States.

== History ==
Indian Village Township was organized in 1853. It was named from the Indians of Iowa present within its borders at the time of its organization.
