= Matchstick Marvels Museum =

- Location: Gladbrook, Iowa
- Coordinates: 42°11′17″N 92°42′56″W
- Website: www.matchstickmarvels.com

The Matchstick Marvels Museum is a museum in Gladbrook, Iowa, that features models created entirely of wooden matchsticks. The models are the work of Pat Acton, a resident of Gladbrook, and date back to 1977. As many as twenty of his large-scaled models are on display at any time. Ripley's Believe It or Not! has purchased 25 of Acton's creations and the museum was featured in a short documentary, part of the Discoveries... America series.

== History and museum ==
Acton has been building wooden matchstick models since 1977. Since then, he has made 70 large complex designs, including of the Notre Dame Cathedral (over 300,000 matchsticks), the United States Capitol (almost 500,000 matchsticks) and the New World Trade Center. Models based on popular culture include the Millennium Falcon from Star Wars, the Starship Enterprise from Star Trek, and Hogwarts from Harry Potter (over 600,000 matchsticks). The museum was opened in 2003. There are around 20 models on display alongside Acton's drawings, plans, tools, and a short film of Acton speaking about his creations. The museum is run by the city of Gladbrook and staffed with volunteers so that Acton can have more time to build models.

Acton's technique has improved over the years, but his process of gluing one matchstick at a time is the same. During the first 10 years of his hobby, Acton cut off the matches' combustible heads and now he buys the matchsticks without the tips from a supplier. All of the models are unpainted except for a North American P-51 Mustang, which he regrets painting because it covered his work. His models have thousands of matchsticks and some of them take years to finish. Acton said, "As a kid I was always screwing up kit models because I was always in a hurry. Well, I've finally found a type of model that I can't hurry."

== Reception ==
As of 2017 Ripley's Believe It or Not! has bought 25 of Acton's matchstick creations. A 30-minute documentary from the film series Discoveries... America documented the museum and Acton in 2004. In a capsule review of the documentary, Video Librarian stated, "An amiable Midwesterner with an awesome talent and wide-ranging imagination, Acton's Matchstick Marvels museum features a breathtaking array of his work, which includes the U.S. Capitol building, an aircraft carrier, and a cathedral... all intricate pieces, precisely made, spotlighting an extraordinary collection built from one man’s creative passion."
