= Tama Township, Tama County, Iowa =

Township in Tama County, Iowa, U.S.

Coordinates: 41°57′55″N 92°35′28″W

Tama Township is one of the twenty-one townships of Tama County, Iowa, United States.
