= Toledo Township, Tama County, Iowa =

Township in Iowa, United States

Coordinates: 42°01′10″N 92°36′56″W

Toledo Township is one of the twenty-one townships of Tama County, Iowa, United States.
