= Chelsea, Iowa =

- City
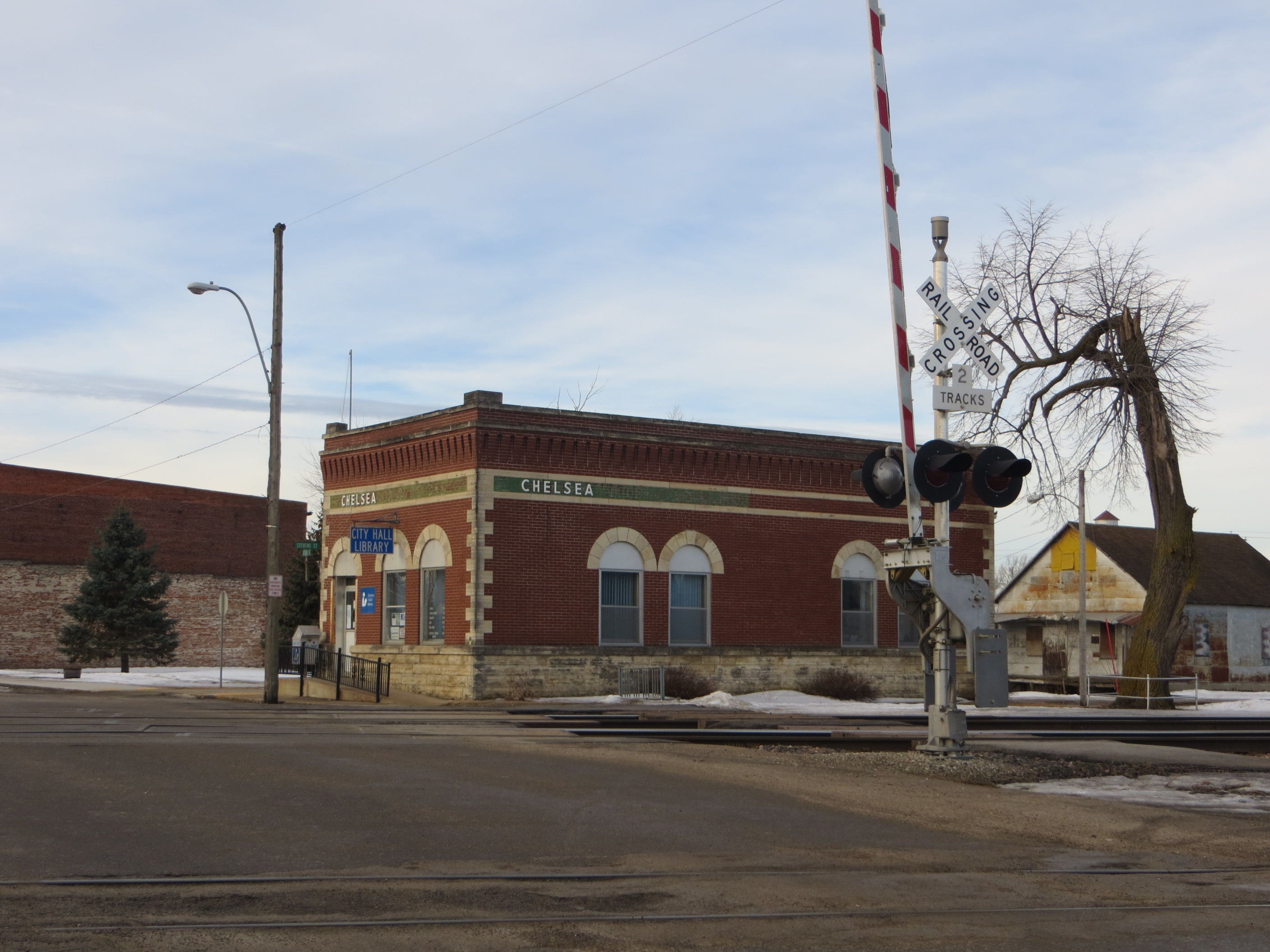
- Chelsea City Hall and Library

- Location of Chelsea, Iowa
- Coordinates: 41°55′14″N 92°23′40″W
- Country: United States
- State: Iowa
- County: Tama

Area
  - Total: 1.01 sq mi (2.62 km^{2})
  - Land: 1.01 sq mi (2.62 km^{2})
  - Water: 0 sq mi (0.00 km^{2})
- Elevation: 784 ft (239 m)

Population (2020)
  - Total: 229
  - Density: 226.0/sq mi (87.26/km^{2})
- Time zone: UTC-6 (Central (CST))
  - Summer (DST): UTC-5 (CDT)
- ZIP code: 52215
- Area code: 641
- FIPS code: 19-12990
- GNIS feature ID: 2393814
- Website: sites.google.com/view/cityofchelseaiowa/

Chelsea is a city in Tama County, Iowa, United States. The population was 229 at the 2020 census. The city is located in the Iowa River Valley and has suffered severe damage in several floods.

== History ==
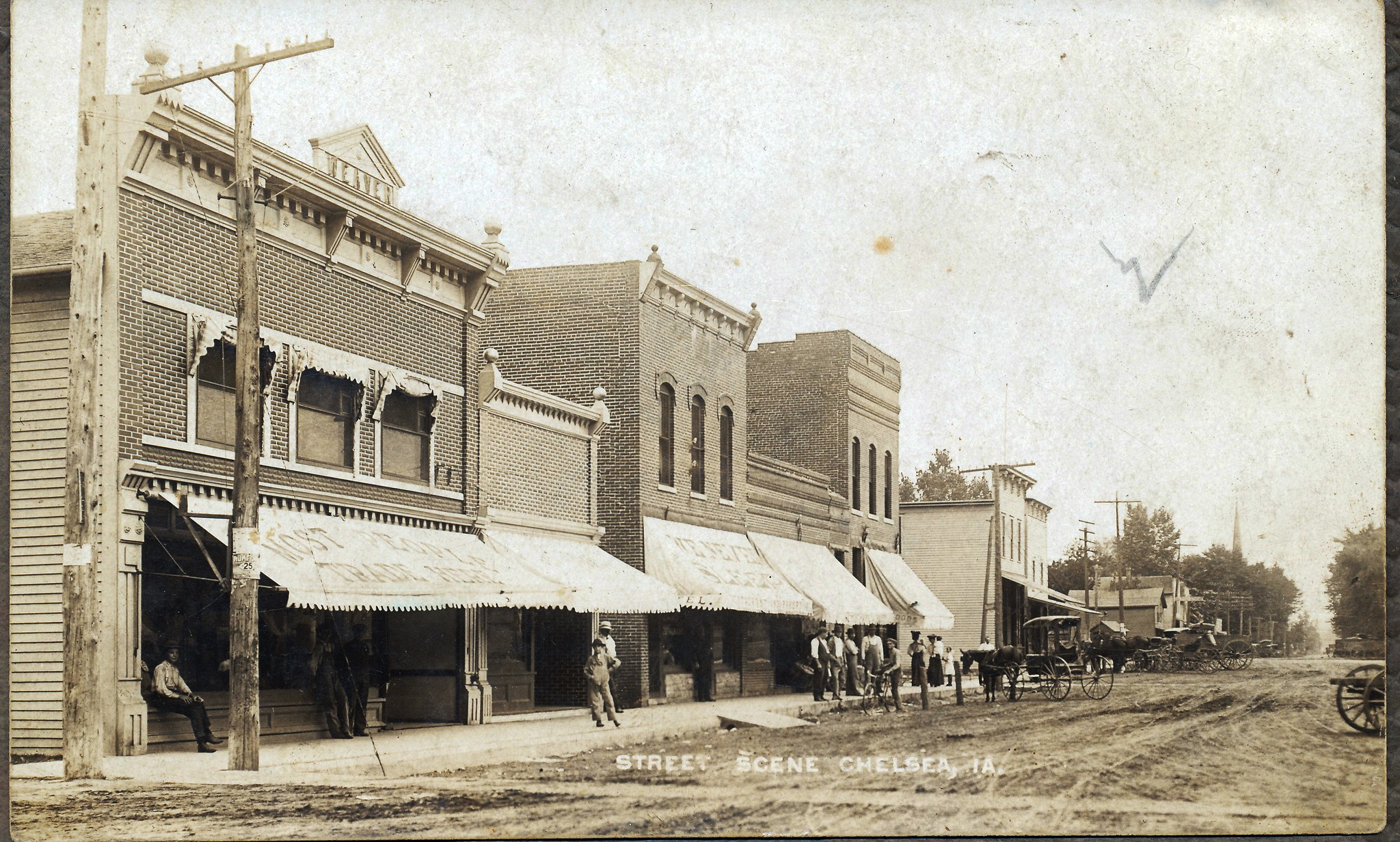
Storefronts on the east side of Station Street in Chelsea Iowa circa 1908.

A post office was established as Chelsea in 1863. Chelsea was laid out in 1863, and it was incorporated in 1878. It was named after Chelsea, Massachusetts.

Chelsea was surveyed in the spring of 1863 by Charles Irish for Seneca C. Breese on the northwest quarter of section 17. A few years later, James Hunter added nine acres on section 7, and in 1870, the Iowa Railroad Land Company added nine acres on section 18. At the time, there was a log cabin on the northeast corner of section 18 and a warehouse built by J. R. Graham in 1862 on the northwest corner of section 17.

The first frame building, built by E. E. Vickery, was used as a blacksmith shop, followed by a dwelling built by E. A. Southard. W. H. Graham opened the first store in 1863, though Peter Scoffish had a store before the village was platted. The railroad reached section 17 in 1861, where a small collection of buildings called Otter Creek served as the terminus for about a year before the village moved with the railroad. Chelsea's first hotel was opened in 1863 by Mrs. Thompson, followed by Samuel Spence. A later two-story hotel burned down. E. A. Southard opened the first cabinet shop in 1864, operating for two years. The post office was established in 1863, with W. H. Graham as postmaster, succeeded by Martin Smith and then Fred Roach in January 1883.

=== Railroad ===
The Cedar Rapids and Missouri River Railroad was the first to reach Chelsea. The Iowa legislature, by an act approved on July 14, 1856, granted land to the Iowa Central Air Line Railroad Company for building a railroad, with certain conditions. The 1857 panic caused the company to collapse. In March 1860, the state reassigned the grant to the Cedar Rapids and Missouri River Railroad Company, formed in 1859 by stockholders of the Chicago, Iowa, and Nebraska Railroad. The railroad progressed steadily: bridging the Cedar River and reaching Otter Creek by 1861 and Chelsea in 1862.

The Cedar Rapids and Missouri River Railroad, under lease to the Chicago & North Western was the first to actually cross Iowa and reach the Missouri River. Thomas C. Durant, vice president Railroad, held stock in multiple railroads and was accused of corruption in manipulating the railroads' stock prices in the race to traverse the state.

=== Flooding ===
The entirety of Chelsea lies in the lowland terrace flood plains of the Iowa River and Otter Creek making the city very prone to recurring flooding.

The largest floods in Chelsea history took place in the years 1918, 1944, 1947, 1960, 1969, 1993 and 2008. Frequent flooding in Chelsea and its associated costs have led to a population decline and a decrease in the overall standard of living in the community.

== Geography ==
Set in the floodplain of the Iowa River Valley, Chelsea is surrounded by hills that are partially forested.

According to the United States Census Bureau, the city has a total area of 1.01 square miles (2.62 km^{2}), all land.

== Demographics ==
Historical populations
Year	Pop.	±%
1880	263	—
1890	318	+20.9%
1900	419	+31.8%
1910	507	+21.0%
1920	557	+9.9%
1930	575	+3.2%
1940	540	−6.1%
1950	482	−10.7%
1960	453	−6.0%
1970	381	−15.9%
1980	376	−1.3%
1990	336	−10.6%
2000	287	−14.6%
2010	267	−7.0%
2020	229	−14.2%
Source:"U.S. Census website". United States Census Bureau. and Iowa Data Center; Source: U.S. Decennial Census

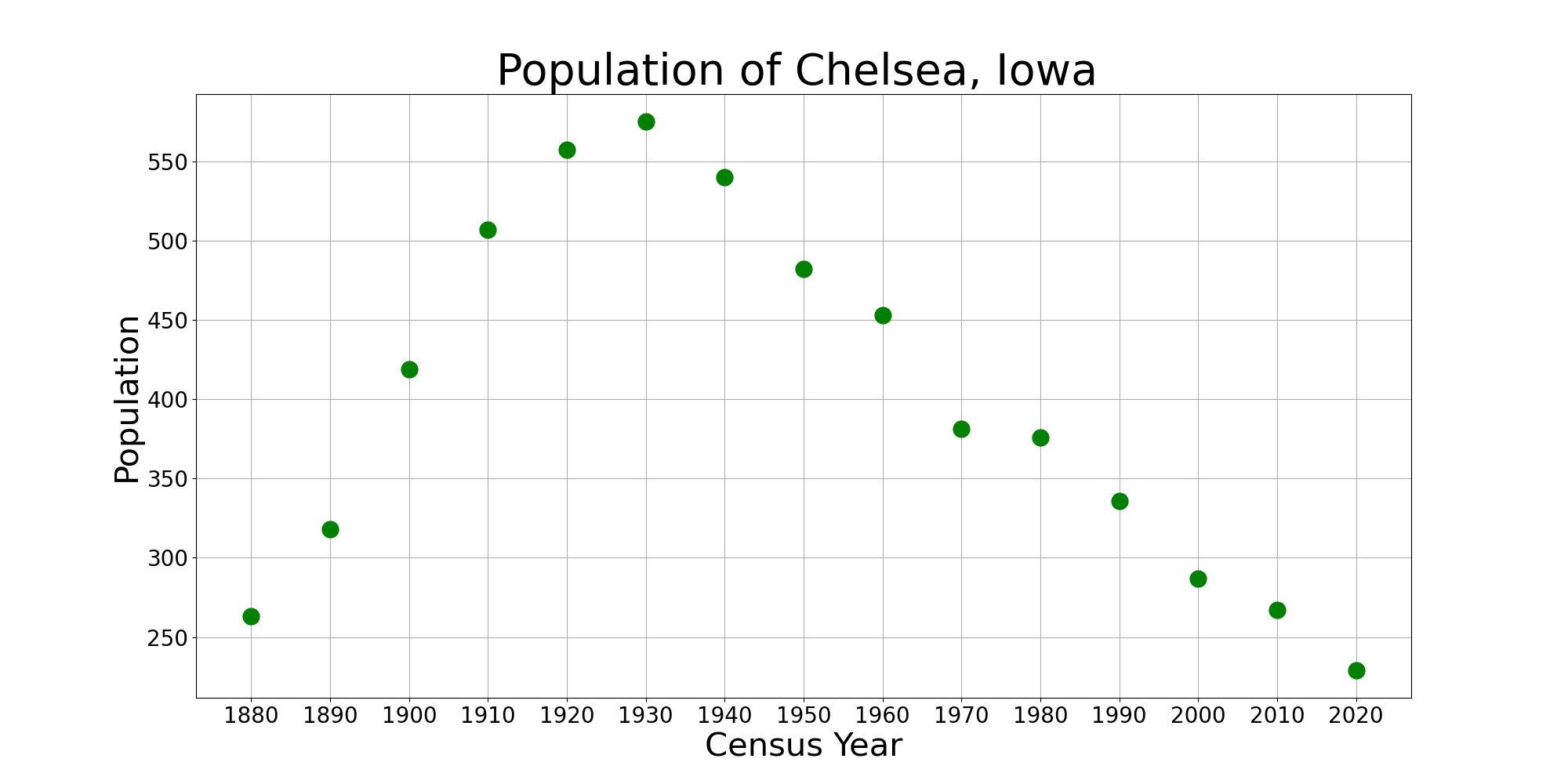
The population of Chelsea, Iowa from US census data

=== 2020 census ===
As of the census of 2020, there were 229 people, 88 households, and 62 families residing in the city. The population density was 226.0 inhabitants per square mile (87.3/km^{2}). There were 99 housing units at an average density of 97.7 per square mile (37.7/km^{2}). The racial makeup of the city was 68.1% White, 0.0% Black or African American, 0.9% Native American, 0.4% Asian, 0.0% Pacific Islander, 22.7% from other races and 7.9% from two or more races. Hispanic or Latino persons of any race comprised 31.4% of the population.

Of the 88 households, 34.1% of which had children under the age of 18 living with them, 46.6% were married couples living together, 8.0% were cohabitating couples, 22.7% had a female householder with no spouse or partner present and 22.7% had a male householder with no spouse or partner present. 29.5% of all households were non-families. 23.9% of all households were made up of individuals, 12.5% had someone living alone who was 65 years old or older.

The median age in the city was 39.1 years. 27.1% of the residents were under the age of 20; 5.7% were between the ages of 20 and 24; 27.1% were from 25 and 44; 25.3% were from 45 and 64; and 14.8% were 65 years of age or older. The gender makeup of the city was 51.1% male and 48.9% female.

=== 2010 census ===
As of the census of 2010, there were 267 people, 94 households, and 60 families living in the city. The population density was 264.4 inhabitants per square mile (102.1/km^{2}). There were 111 housing units at an average density of 109.9 per square mile (42.4/km^{2}). The racial makeup of the city was 79.0% White, 3.4% Native American, 17.2% from other races, and 0.4% from two or more races. Hispanic or Latino of any race were 34.1% of the population.

There were 94 households, of which 39.4% had children under the age of 18 living with them, 53.2% were married couples living together, 4.3% had a female householder with no husband present, 6.4% had a male householder with no wife present, and 36.2% were non-families. 30.9% of all households were made up of individuals, and 13.8% had someone living alone who was 65 years of age or older. The average household size was 2.84 and the average family size was 3.70.

The median age in the city was 30.8 years. 29.6% of residents were under the age of 18; 12.7% were between the ages of 18 and 24; 25.1% were from 25 to 44; 20.9% were from 45 to 64; and 11.6% were 65 years of age or older. The gender makeup of the city was 51.7% male and 48.3% female.

=== 2000 census ===
As of the census of 2000, there were 287 people, 98 households, and 70 families living in the city. The population density was 283.6 inhabitants per square mile (109.5/km^{2}). There were 113 housing units at an average density of 111.7 per square mile (43.1/km^{2}). The racial makeup of the city was 74.56% White, 0.35% Native American, 0.70% Asian, 22.30% from other races, and 2.09% from two or more races. Hispanic or Latino of any race were 31.36% of the population.

There were 98 households, out of which 37.8% had children under the age of 18 living with them, 50.0% were married couples living together, 10.2% had a female householder with no husband present, and 27.6% were non-families. 24.5% of all households were made up of individuals, and 13.3% had someone living alone who was 65 years of age or older. The average household size was 2.93 and the average family size was 3.52.

35.2% are under the age of 18, 7.0% from 18 to 24, 26.1% from 25 to 44, 17.1% from 45 to 64, and 14.6% who were 65 years of age or older. The median age was 33 years. For every 100 females, there were 112.6 males. For every 100 females age 18 and over, there were 113.8 males.

The median income for a household in the city was $30,625, and the median income for a family was $36,750. Males had a median income of $28,854 versus $24,000 for females. The per capita income for the city was $13,608. About 14.1% of families and 19.5% of the population were below the poverty line, including 26.5% of those under the age of eighteen and 4.5% of those 65 or over.

== Education ==
Chelsea is within the South Tama County Community School District.
