= Green Mountain, Iowa =

- Census-designated place
- Location within Iowa Location within the United States
- Coordinates: 42°06′07″N 92°49′11″W
- Country: United States
- State: Iowa
- County: Marshall
- Established: 1883

Area
  - Total: 0.69 sq mi (1.78 km^{2})
  - Land: 0.69 sq mi (1.78 km^{2})
  - Water: 0 sq mi (0.00 km^{2})
- Elevation: 991 ft (302 m)

Population (2020)
  - Total: 113
  - Density: 164.8/sq mi (63.62/km^{2})
- Time zone: UTC-6 (Central (CST))
  - Summer (DST): UTC-5 (CDT)
- ZIP code: 50632
- Area code: 641
- FIPS code: 19-32925
- GNIS feature ID: 2629966

Green Mountain is a rural unincorporated community and census-designated place (CDP) in Marshall County, Iowa, United States. It is located in Marion Township. As of the 2020 census the population of Green Mountain was 113.

== History ==
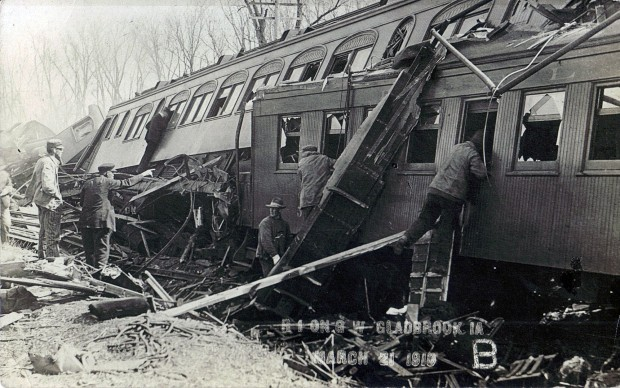
Green Mountain train wreck, March 21, 1910

As early as 1856, a few settlers from Vermont settled about a mile north of the present-day community; they named their community after their home in Vermont. The present-day town of Green Mountain, south of the original townsite, was established in 1883, platted by the Iowa Construction Company. The town was built adjacent to the Chicago Great Western Railroad.

The Green Mountain Congregational Church, one of the first in the county, was built in Green Mountain, along with a grain elevator and a few businesses; a savings bank was constructed in 1907. The population of the community was 41 in 1902.

Green Mountain, Iowa, was the site of the Green Mountain train wreck. The wreck is known as the worst ever in Iowa history, as 52 people were killed in the accident on March 21, 1910.

In 1925, Green Mountain's population was 106. The population was 163 in 1940.

== Geography ==
Green Mountain is in northeastern Marshall County, 7 miles (11 km) northeast of Marshalltown, the county seat. According to the U.S. Census Bureau, the Green Mountain CDP has an area of 0.69 square miles (1.79 km^{2}), all land. The headwaters of Nickolson Creek run through the west side of the community, flowing south to join Rock Creek, which in turn joins the Iowa River east of Marshalltown.

== Demographics ==
Historical population
| Census | Pop. | Note | %± |
|---|---|---|---|
| 2010 | 126 | | — |
| 2020 | 113 | | −10.3% |
U.S. Decennial Census

=== 2020 census ===
As of the census of 2020, there were 113 people, 61 households, and 44 families residing in the community. The population density was 164.8 inhabitants per square mile (63.6/km^{2}). There were 62 housing units at an average density of 90.4 per square mile (34.9/km^{2}). The racial makeup of the community was 94.7% White, 0.0% Black or African American, 0.0% Native American, 0.0% Asian, 0.0% Pacific Islander, 2.7% from other races and 2.7% from two or more races. Hispanic or Latino persons of any race comprised 6.2% of the population.

Of the 61 households, 13.1% of which had children under the age of 18 living with them, 68.9% were married couples living together, 3.3% were cohabitating couples, 11.5% had a female householder with no spouse or partner present and 16.4% had a male householder with no spouse or partner present. 27.9% of all households were non-families. 24.6% of all households were made up of individuals, 8.2% had someone living alone who was 65 years old or older.

The median age in the community was 52.5 years. 18.6% of the residents were under the age of 20; 5.3% were between the ages of 20 and 24; 17.7% were from 25 and 44; 27.4% were from 45 and 64; and 31.0% were 65 years of age or older. The gender makeup of the community was 46.9% male and 53.1% female.

== Education ==
The GMG Community School District serves the community. The district was established on July 1, 1987, by the merger of the Garwin and Green Mountain school districts.
