= Vining, Iowa =

- City
- Location of Vining, Iowa
- Coordinates: 41°59′28″N 92°23′14″W
- Country: United States
- State: Iowa
- County: Tama

Area
  - Total: 0.55 sq mi (1.43 km^{2})
  - Land: 0.55 sq mi (1.43 km^{2})
  - Water: 0 sq mi (0.00 km^{2})
- Elevation: 853 ft (260 m)

Population (2020)
  - Total: 54
  - Density: 97.6/sq mi (37.68/km^{2})
- Time zone: UTC-6 (Central (CST))
  - Summer (DST): UTC-5 (CDT)
- ZIP code: 52348
- Area code: 641
- FIPS code: 19-81120
- GNIS feature ID: 2397146

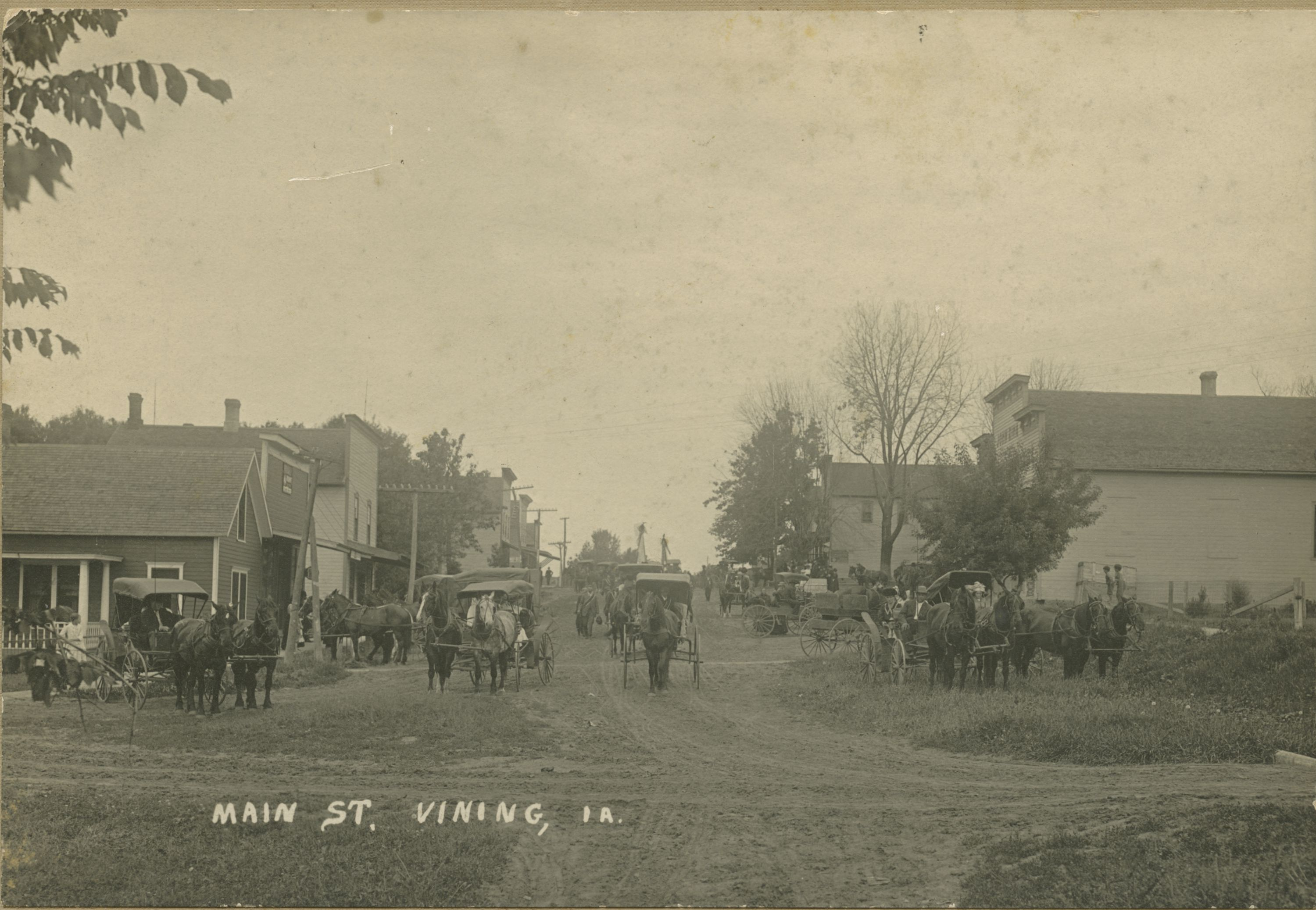
Main Street, Vining, Iowa in 1913

Vining is a city in Tama County, Iowa, United States. The population was 54 at the time of the 2020 census.

== Geography ==
According to the United States Census Bureau, the city has a total area of 0.57 square miles (1.48 km^{2}), all land.

== Demographics ==
Historical populations
Year	Pop.	±%
1920	153	—
1930	163	+6.5%
1940	126	−22.7%
1950	112	−11.1%
1960	122	+8.9%
1970	71	−41.8%
1980	96	+35.2%
1990	78	−18.8%
2000	70	−10.3%
2010	50	−28.6%
2020	54	+8.0%
Source:"U.S. Census website". United States Census Bureau. and Iowa Data Center; Source: U.S. Decennial Census

=== 2020 census ===
As of the census of 2020, there were 54 people, 28 households, and 21 families residing in the city. The population density was 97.6 inhabitants per square mile (37.7/km^{2}). There were 28 housing units at an average density of 50.6 per square mile (19.5/km^{2}). The racial makeup of the city was 94.4% White, 0.0% Black or African American, 0.0% Native American, 0.0% Asian, 0.0% Pacific Islander, 0.0% from other races and 5.6% from two or more races. Hispanic or Latino persons of any race comprised 3.7% of the population.

Of the 28 households, 35.7% of which had children under the age of 18 living with them, 42.9% were married couples living together, 7.1% were cohabitating couples, 32.1% had a female householder with no spouse or partner present and 17.9% had a male householder with no spouse or partner present. 25.0% of all households were non-families. 25.0% of all households were made up of individuals, 7.1% had someone living alone who was 65 years old or older.

The median age in the city was 54.0 years. 16.7% of the residents were under the age of 20; 5.6% were between the ages of 20 and 24; 16.7% were from 25 and 44; 27.8% were from 45 and 64; and 33.3% were 65 years of age or older. The gender makeup of the city was 50.0% male and 50.0% female.

=== 2010 census ===
As of the census of 2010, there were 50 people, 24 households, and 16 families living in the city. The population density was 87.7 inhabitants per square mile (33.9/km^{2}). There were 30 housing units at an average density of 52.6 per square mile (20.3/km^{2}). The racial makeup of the city was 90.0% White and 10.0% Native American.

There were 24 households, of which 25.0% had children under the age of 18 living with them, 54.2% were married couples living together, 12.5% had a female householder with no husband present, and 33.3% were non-families. 29.2% of all households were made up of individuals. The average household size was 2.08 and the average family size was 2.56.

The median age in the city was 50.5 years. 18% of residents were under the age of 18; 2% were between the ages of 18 and 24; 22% were from 25 to 44; 42% were from 45 to 64; and 16% were 65 years of age or older. The gender makeup of the city was 52.0% male and 48.0% female.

=== 2000 census ===
As of the census of 2000, there were 70 people, 30 households, and 21 families living in the city. The population density was 121.4 inhabitants per square mile (46.9/km^{2}). There were 36 housing units at an average density of 62.5 per square mile (24.1/km^{2}). The racial makeup of the city was 98.57% White and 1.43% Asian.

There were 30 households, out of which 16.7% had children under the age of 18 living with them, 66.7% were married couples living together, 6.7% had a female householder with no husband present, and 26.7% were non-families. 20.0% of all households were made up of individuals, and 6.7% had someone living alone who was 65 years of age or older. The average household size was 2.33 and the average family size was 2.73.

In the city, the population was spread out, with 14.3% under the age of 18, 10.0% from 18 to 24, 22.9% from 25 to 44, 35.7% from 45 to 64, and 17.1% who were 65 years of age or older. The median age was 46 years. For every 100 females, there were 100.0 males. For every 100 females age 18 and over, there were 93.5 males.

The median income for a household in the city was $42,917, and the median income for a family was $43,333. Males had a median income of $29,375 versus $25,625 for females. The per capita income for the city was $17,458. There were no families and 2.5% of the population living below the poverty line, including no under eighteens and none of those over 64.

== Education ==
Vining is within the South Tama County Community School District.
