= Montour, Iowa =

- City
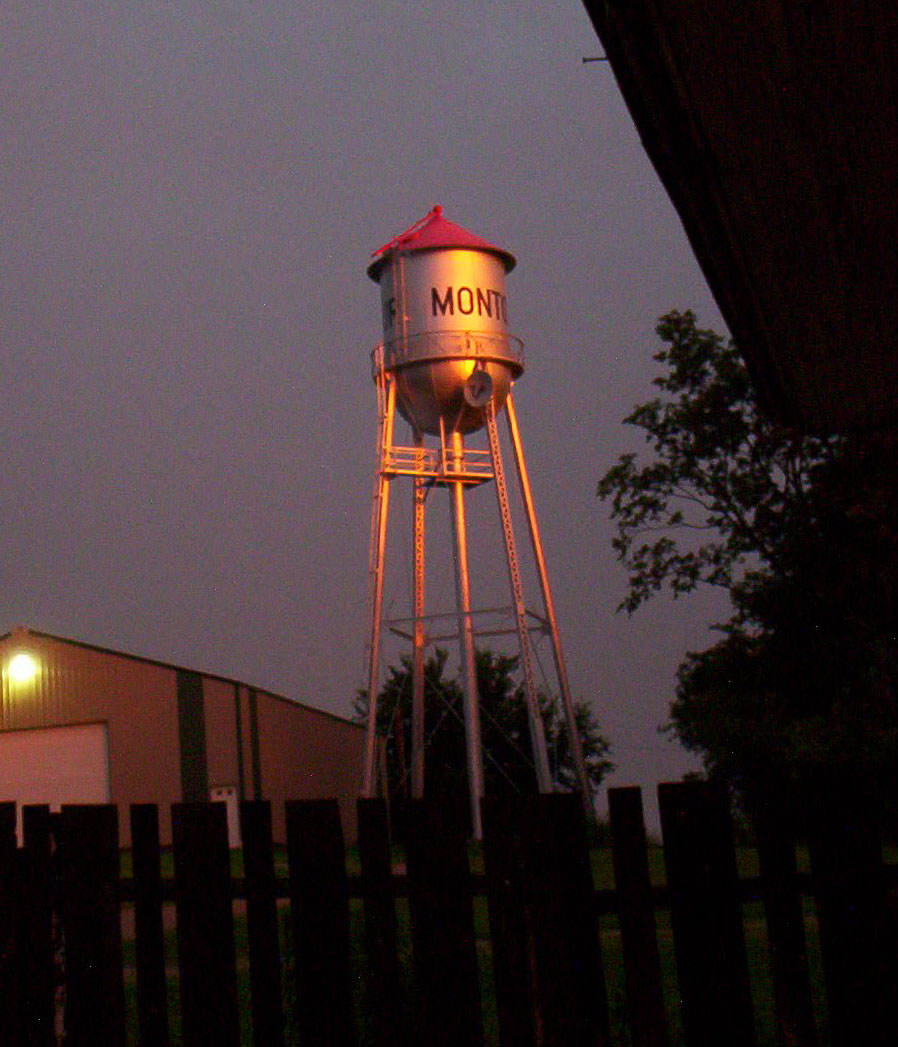
- Water tower in Montour

- Location of Mountour, Iowa
- Coordinates: 41°58′49″N 92°42′54″W
- Country: United States
- State: Iowa
- County: Tama

Area
  - Total: 0.46 sq mi (1.18 km^{2})
  - Land: 0.46 sq mi (1.18 km^{2})
  - Water: 0 sq mi (0.00 km^{2})
- Elevation: 853 ft (260 m)

Population (2020)
  - Total: 203
  - Density: 444.3/sq mi (171.55/km^{2})
- Time zone: UTC-6 (Central (CST))
  - Summer (DST): UTC-5 (CDT)
- ZIP code: 50173
- Area code: 641
- FIPS code: 19-53670
- GNIS feature ID: 2395387

Montour is a city in Tama County, Iowa, United States. The population was 203 at the time of the 2020 census.

== History ==
Montour was originally called Orford. A post office was established as Orford in 1864, and renamed Montour in 1873. The present name is after Montour County, Pennsylvania.

Montour was incorporated as a city in 1870.

== Geography ==
According to the United States Census Bureau, the city has a total area of 0.46 square miles (1.19 km^{2}), all land.

== Demographics ==
Historical populations
Year	Pop.	±%
1880	457	—
1890	409	−10.5%
1900	502	+22.7%
1910	383	−23.7%
1920	409	+6.8%
1930	370	−9.5%
1940	393	+6.2%
1950	380	−3.3%
1960	252	−33.7%
1970	334	+32.5%
1980	387	+15.9%
1990	312	−19.4%
2000	285	−8.7%
2010	249	−12.6%
2020	203	−18.5%
Source:"U.S. Census website". United States Census Bureau. and Iowa Data Center; Source: U.S. Decennial Census

=== 2020 census ===
As of the census of 2020, there were 203 people, 94 households, and 67 families residing in the city. The population density was 444.3 inhabitants per square mile (171.6/km^{2}). There were 107 housing units at an average density of 234.2 per square mile (90.4/km^{2}). The racial makeup of the city was 92.6% White, 0.0% Black or African American, 3.0% Native American, 0.5% Asian, 0.0% Pacific Islander, 1.0% from other races and 3.0% from two or more races. Hispanic or Latino persons of any race comprised 2.0% of the population.

Of the 94 households, 22.3% of which had children under the age of 18 living with them, 51.1% were married couples living together, 12.8% were cohabitating couples, 17.0% had a female householder with no spouse or partner present and 19.1% had a male householder with no spouse or partner present. 28.7% of all households were non-families. 22.3% of all households were made up of individuals, 13.8% had someone living alone who was 65 years old or older.

The median age in the city was 50.9 years. 14.8% of the residents were under the age of 20; 4.4% were between the ages of 20 and 24; 20.2% were from 25 and 44; 36.0% were from 45 and 64; and 24.6% were 65 years of age or older. The gender makeup of the city was 50.7% male and 49.3% female.

=== 2010 census ===
As of the census of 2010, there were 249 people, 106 households, and 71 families living in the city. The population density was 541.3 inhabitants per square mile (209.0/km^{2}). There were 116 housing units at an average density of 252.2 per square mile (97.4/km^{2}). The racial makeup of the city was 94.4% White, 4.4% Native American, 0.4% from other races, and 0.8% from two or more races. Hispanic or Latino of any race were 3.2% of the population.

There were 106 households, of which 25.5% had children under the age of 18 living with them, 53.8% were married couples living together, 10.4% had a female householder with no husband present, 2.8% had a male householder with no wife present, and 33.0% were non-families. 28.3% of all households were made up of individuals, and 11.3% had someone living alone who was 65 years of age or older. The average household size was 2.35 and the average family size was 2.86.

The median age in the city was 45.1 years. 21.3% of residents were under the age of 18; 4.7% were between the ages of 18 and 24; 23.6% were from 25 to 44; 34.8% were from 45 to 64; and 15.3% were 65 years of age or older. The gender makeup of the city was 49.0% male and 51.0% female.

=== 2000 census ===
As of the census of 2000, there were 285 people, 116 households, and 85 families living in the city. The population density was 630.0 inhabitants per square mile (243.2/km^{2}). There were 124 housing units at an average density of 274.1 per square mile (105.8/km^{2}). The racial makeup of the city was 96.49% White, 2.46% Native American, and 1.05% from two or more races. Hispanic or Latino of any race were 0.35% of the population.

There were 116 households, out of which 30.2% had children under the age of 18 living with them, 62.9% were married couples living together, 8.6% had a female householder with no husband present, and 25.9% were non-families. 19.8% of all households were made up of individuals, and 6.0% had someone living alone who was 65 years of age or older. The average household size was 2.46 and the average family size was 2.80.

24.6% are under the age of 18, 6.7% from 18 to 24, 31.2% from 25 to 44, 24.2% from 45 to 64, and 13.3% who were 65 years of age or older. The median age was 39 years. For every 100 females, there were 109.6 males. For every 100 females age 18 and over, there were 108.7 males.

The median income for a household in the city was $40,000, and the median income for a family was $43,500. Males had a median income of $34,375 versus $21,979 for females. The per capita income for the city was $16,786. About 2.6% of families and 4.7% of the population were below the poverty line, including 2.0% of those under the age of eighteen and none of those 65 or over.

Montour is home to several mennonite families.

== Education ==
Montour is located within the South Tama County Community School District.
