= Carlton Township, Tama County, Iowa =

Township in Iowa, United States

Coordinates: 42.067684°N 92.718115°W

Location of Carlton Township in Tama County

Carlton Township is one of the twenty-one townships of Tama County, Iowa, United States.

== History ==
Carlton Township was organized in 1854. It is named for Judge James P. Carlton, of Iowa.
