= Spring Creek Township, Tama County, Iowa =

Township in Tama County, Iowa

Coordinates: 42°10′27″N 92°43′06″W

Spring Creek Township is one of the twenty-one townships of Tama County, Iowa, United States.
