= Elberon, Iowa =

- City
- Location of Elberon, Iowa
- Coordinates: 42°00′20″N 92°18′58″W
- Country: United States
- State: Iowa
- County: Tama

Area
  - Total: 0.66 sq mi (1.70 km^{2})
  - Land: 0.66 sq mi (1.70 km^{2})
  - Water: 0 sq mi (0.00 km^{2})
- Elevation: 889 ft (271 m)

Population (2020)
  - Total: 184
  - Density: 281/sq mi (108.4/km^{2})
- Time zone: UTC-6 (Central (CST))
  - Summer (DST): UTC-5 (CDT)
- ZIP code: 52225
- Area code: 319
- FIPS code: 19-24375
- GNIS feature ID: 2394634

Elberon is a city in Tama County, Iowa, United States. The population was 184 at the time of the 2020 census.

== History ==
A post office called Elberon has been in operation since 1882. The city was named after Elberon, New Jersey.

== Geography ==
According to the United States Census Bureau, the city has a total area of 0.65 square miles (1.68 km^{2}), all land.

== Demographics ==
Historical populations
Year	Pop.	±%
1900	344	—
1910	336	−2.3%
1920	349	+3.9%
1930	254	−27.2%
1940	256	+0.8%
1950	225	−12.1%
1960	211	−6.2%
1970	203	−3.8%
1980	194	−4.4%
1990	203	+4.6%
2000	245	+20.7%
2010	196	−20.0%
2020	184	−6.1%
Source:"U.S. Census website". United States Census Bureau. and Iowa Data Center; Source: U.S. Decennial Census

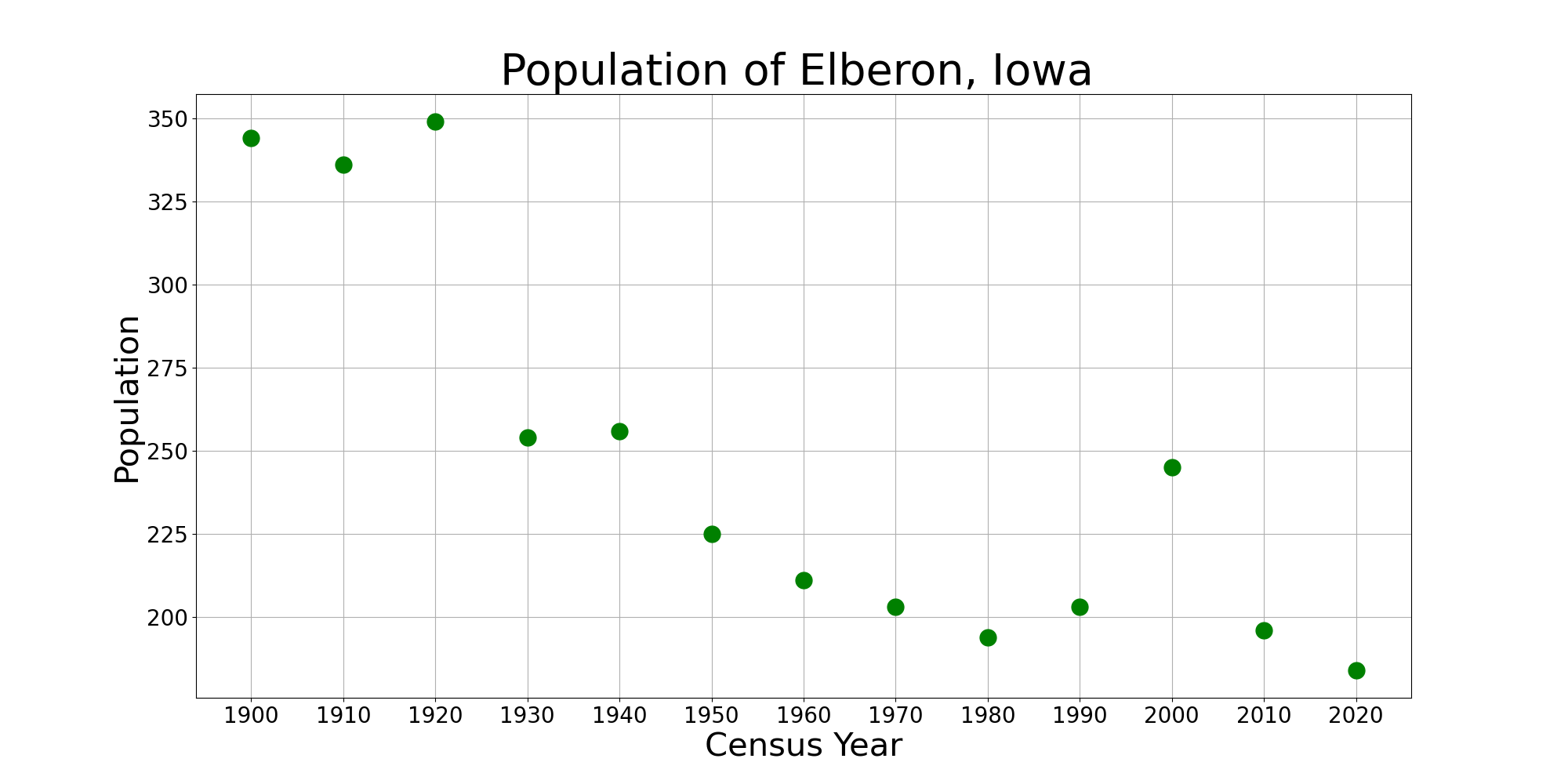
The population of Elberon, Iowa from US census data

=== 2020 census ===
As of the census of 2020, there were 184 people, 76 households, and 53 families residing in the city. The population density was 280.8 inhabitants per square mile (108.4/km^{2}). There were 86 housing units at an average density of 131.2 per square mile (50.7/km^{2}). The racial makeup of the city was 93.5% White, 0.0% Black or African American, 0.0% Native American, 0.5% Asian, 0.0% Pacific Islander, 1.6% from other races and 4.3% from two or more races. Hispanic or Latino persons of any race comprised 1.6% of the population.

Of the 76 households, 30.3% of which had children under the age of 18 living with them, 47.4% were married couples living together, 14.5% were cohabitating couples, 26.3% had a female householder with no spouse or partner present and 11.8% had a male householder with no spouse or partner present. 30.3% of all households were non-families. 21.1% of all households were made up of individuals, 7.9% had someone living alone who was 65 years old or older.

The median age in the city was 41.5 years. 22.8% of the residents were under the age of 20; 8.2% were between the ages of 20 and 24; 25.0% were from 25 and 44; 23.9% were from 45 and 64; and 20.1% were 65 years of age or older. The gender makeup of the city was 50.5% male and 49.5% female.

=== 2010 census ===
As of the census of 2010, there were 196 people, 74 households, and 51 families living in the city. The population density was 301.5 inhabitants per square mile (116.4/km^{2}). There were 90 housing units at an average density of 138.5 per square mile (53.5/km^{2}). The racial makeup of the city was 96.4% White, 0.5% Asian, 2.6% from other races, and 0.5% from two or more races. Hispanic or Latino of any race were 2.6% of the population.

There were 74 households, of which 31.1% had children under the age of 18 living with them, 59.5% were married couples living together, 6.8% had a female householder with no husband present, 2.7% had a male householder with no wife present, and 31.1% were non-families. 27.0% of all households were made up of individuals, and 16.3% had someone living alone who was 65 years of age or older. The average household size was 2.65 and the average family size was 3.25.

The median age in the city was 38.5 years. 24.5% of residents were under the age of 18; 7.6% were between the ages of 18 and 24; 23% were from 25 to 44; 27.5% were from 45 to 64; and 17.3% were 65 years of age or older. The gender makeup of the city was 53.1% male and 46.9% female.

=== 2000 census ===
As of the census of 2000, there were 245 people, 87 households, and 64 families living in the city. The population density was 373.6 inhabitants per square mile (144.2/km^{2}). There were 94 housing units at an average density of 143.3 per square mile (55.3/km^{2}). The racial makeup of the city was 96.33% White, 0.82% Native American, 2.45% from other races, and 0.41% from two or more races. Hispanic or Latino of any race were 4.49% of the population.

There were 87 households, out of which 43.7% had children under the age of 18 living with them, 56.3% were married couples living together, 11.5% had a female householder with no husband present, and 26.4% were non-families. 21.8% of all households were made up of individuals, and 9.2% had someone living alone who was 65 years of age or older. The average household size was 2.82 and the average family size was 3.33.

In the city, the population was spread out, with 34.7% under the age of 18, 9.8% from 18 to 24, 23.7% from 25 to 44, 18.4% from 45 to 64, and 13.5% who were 65 years of age or older. The median age was 30 years. For every 100 females, there were 109.4 males. For every 100 females age 18 and over, there were 102.5 males.

The median income for a household in the city was $38,594, and the median income for a family was $39,583. Males had a median income of $23,571 versus $21,000 for females. The per capita income for the city was $12,440. About 10.7% of families and 15.5% of the population were below the poverty line, including 24.2% of those under the age of eighteen and none of those 65 or over.

== Education ==
Benton Community School District operates local public schools.
