= Native American tribes in Iowa =

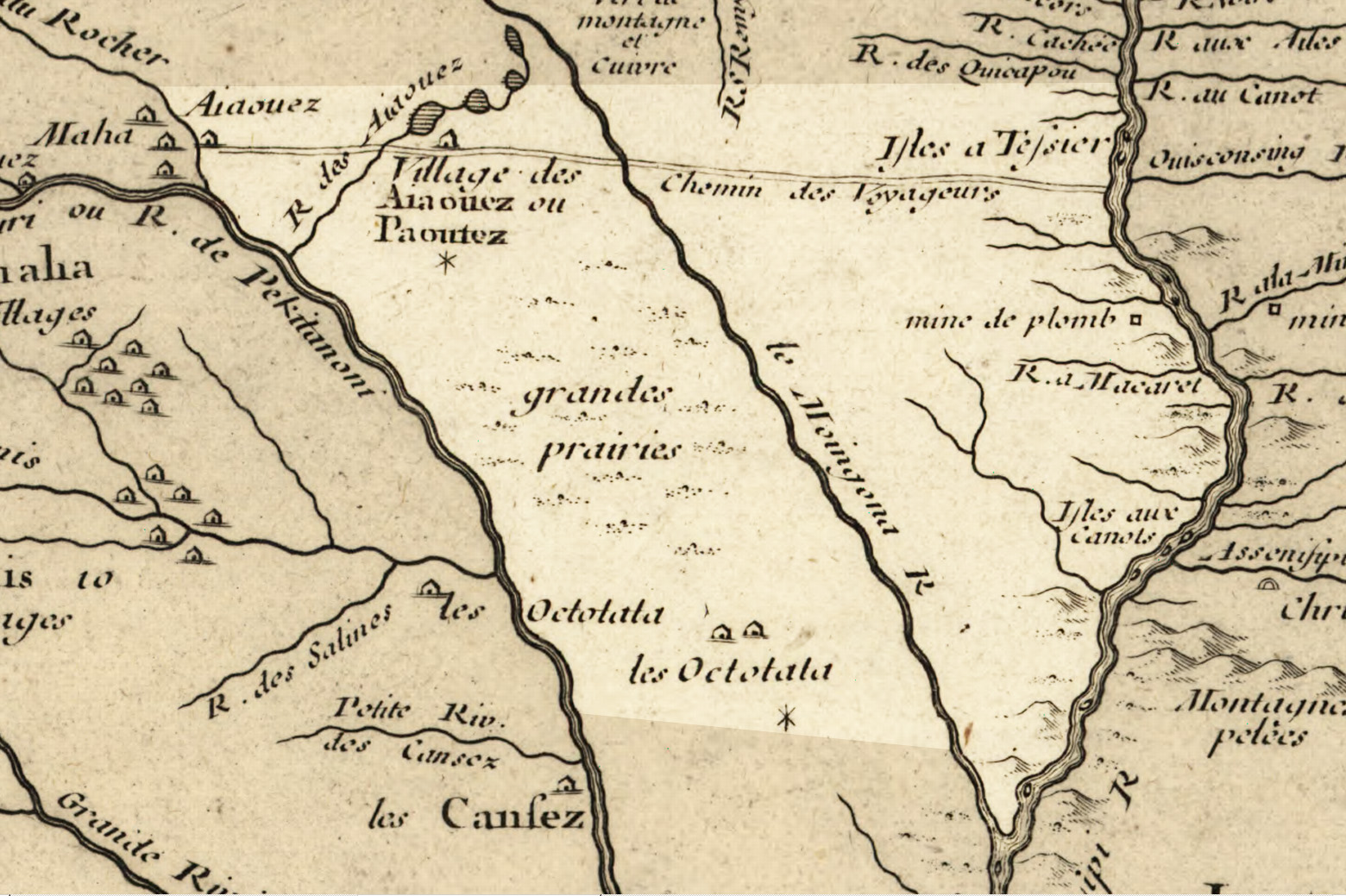
1718 Guillaume Delisle map, showing locations of the Ioway (Aiouez au Pauotez), the Omaha (Maha), the Otoe (Octotata), and the Kaw (Cansez), and the main voyageur trail (Chemin des voyageurs).

Several Native American tribes hold or have held territory within the lands that are now the state of Iowa.

Iowa, defined by the Missouri River and Big Sioux River on the west and Mississippi River on the east, marks a shift from the Central Plains and the Eastern Woodlands. It fits within the Prairie cultural region; however, this region is seldom used, and the region is more commonly split between Great Plains and Northeastern Woodlands.

Many tribes have migrated through or been forcibly removed through the region.

== Today ==
Today, there are four federally recognized tribes in Iowa: the Omaha Tribe of Nebraska, the Sac and Fox Tribe of the Mississippi in Iowa, the Ponca Tribe of Nebraska and the Winnebago Tribe of Nebraska.

== Precontact era ==
=== Chiwere and Hochunk ===
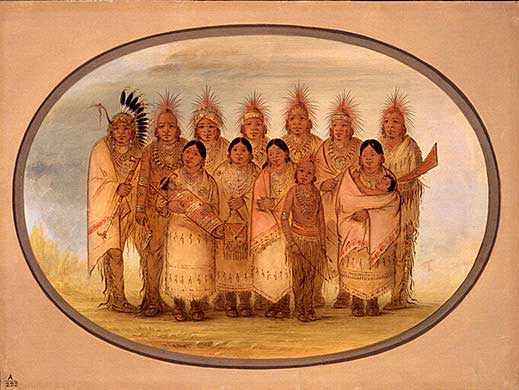
Iowa, 1861

- Ho-Chunk (Winnebago)
- Iowa (Baxoje)
- Missouria
- Otoes

The precontact Oneota culture may have included Chiwere language–speaking peoples. At the time of contact with European explorers, their range covered most of Iowa. The Ho-Chunk ranged primarily east of the Mississippi in southern Wisconsin, the Ioway/Baxoje ranged in northern Iowa, the Otoe in central and southern Iowa, and the Missouria in far southern Iowa. All these tribes were also active during the historic period.

=== Dhegihan peoples ===
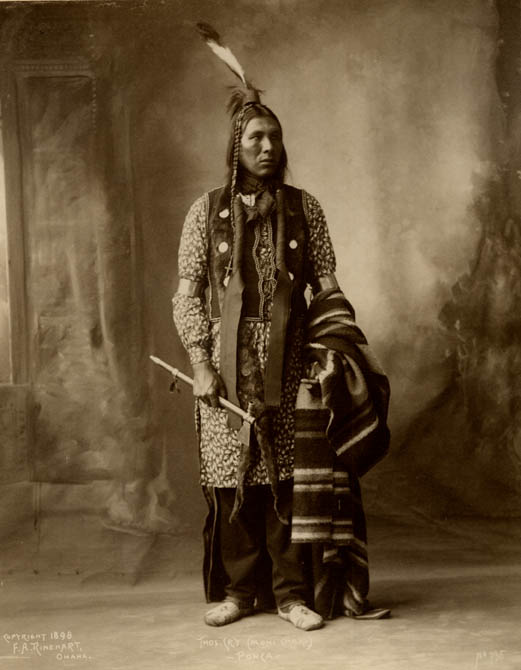
Moni Chaki, Ponca, 1898

The following tribes arrived in the late prehistoric period:

- Kaw (Kansa)
- Omaha
- Osage
- Ponca

The Dhegihan-speaking peoples lived near the Missouri River in the very Late precontact and post-contact periods; they appear to have migrated to the region from the south or southeast. Their origin location is debated.

=== Dakota peoples ===
- Santee Dakota
- Yankton Dakota

The Dakota pushed southward into much of Iowa in the 18th and 19th centuries. They often encountered European-American settlers. In 1840, the translator Isaac Galland noted several Dakota groups in or near Iowa, including Wahpekute, North Sisseton, South Sisseton, East Wahpetonwan, West Wahpetonwan, Yankton, and Mdewakantonwan.

=== Other tribes ===
The following tribes also had an early presence in Iowa:

- Hidatsa
- Mandan

These may be descendants of the Mill Creek culture who flourished from 1100 to 1300 CE and whose territory extended into northwest Iowa. Their territory was wide. The Lewis and Clark expedition reported on Mandan villages on the upper Missouri River.

== Post-contact ==
=== Arikara and Pawnee ===
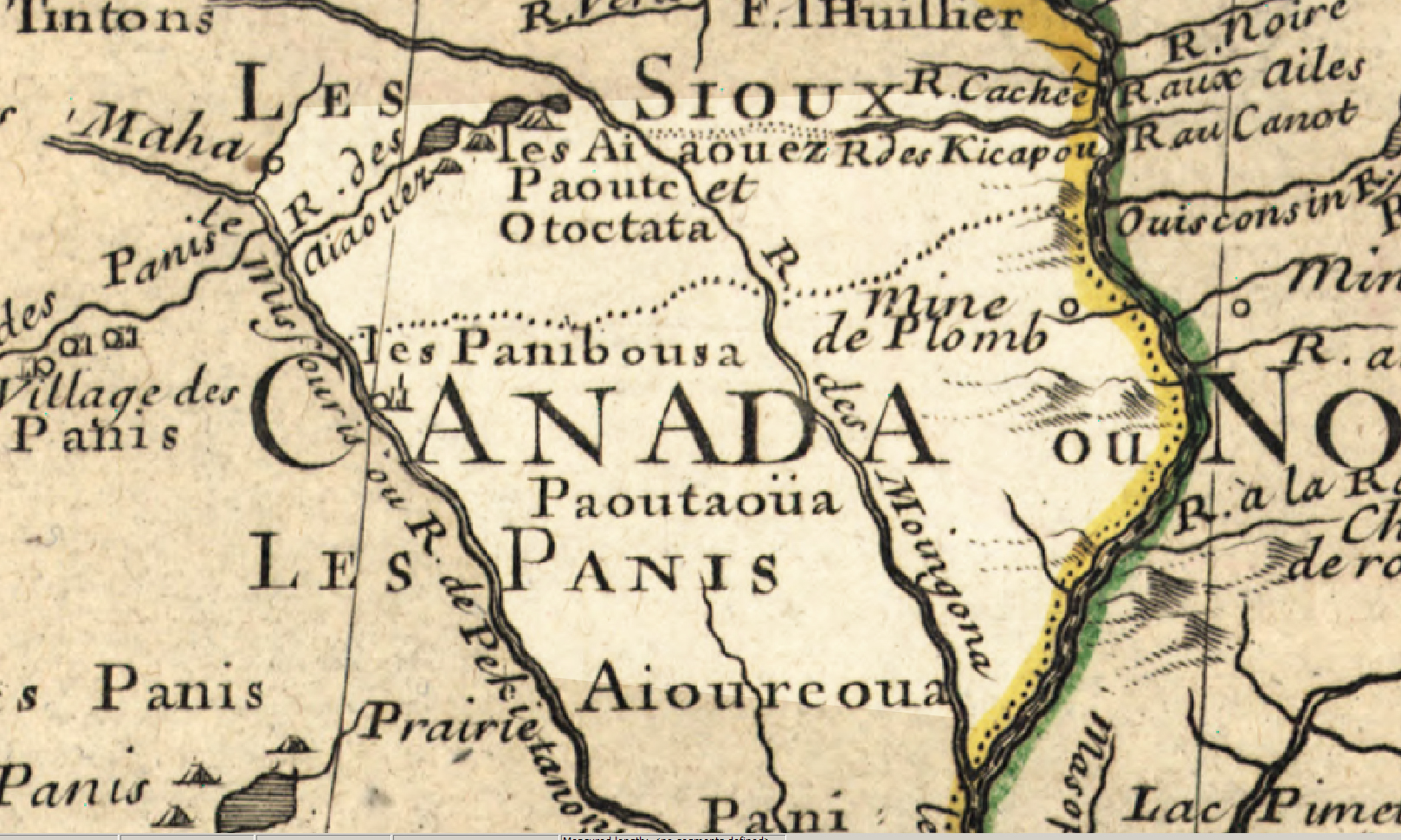
Iowa, 1798, showing several tribes, including Pawnee (Panis/Panibousa), Iowa (Aiaouez/Aioureoua and Paoute/Paoutaoua), Dakota, and Omaha (Maha); approximate state highlighted.

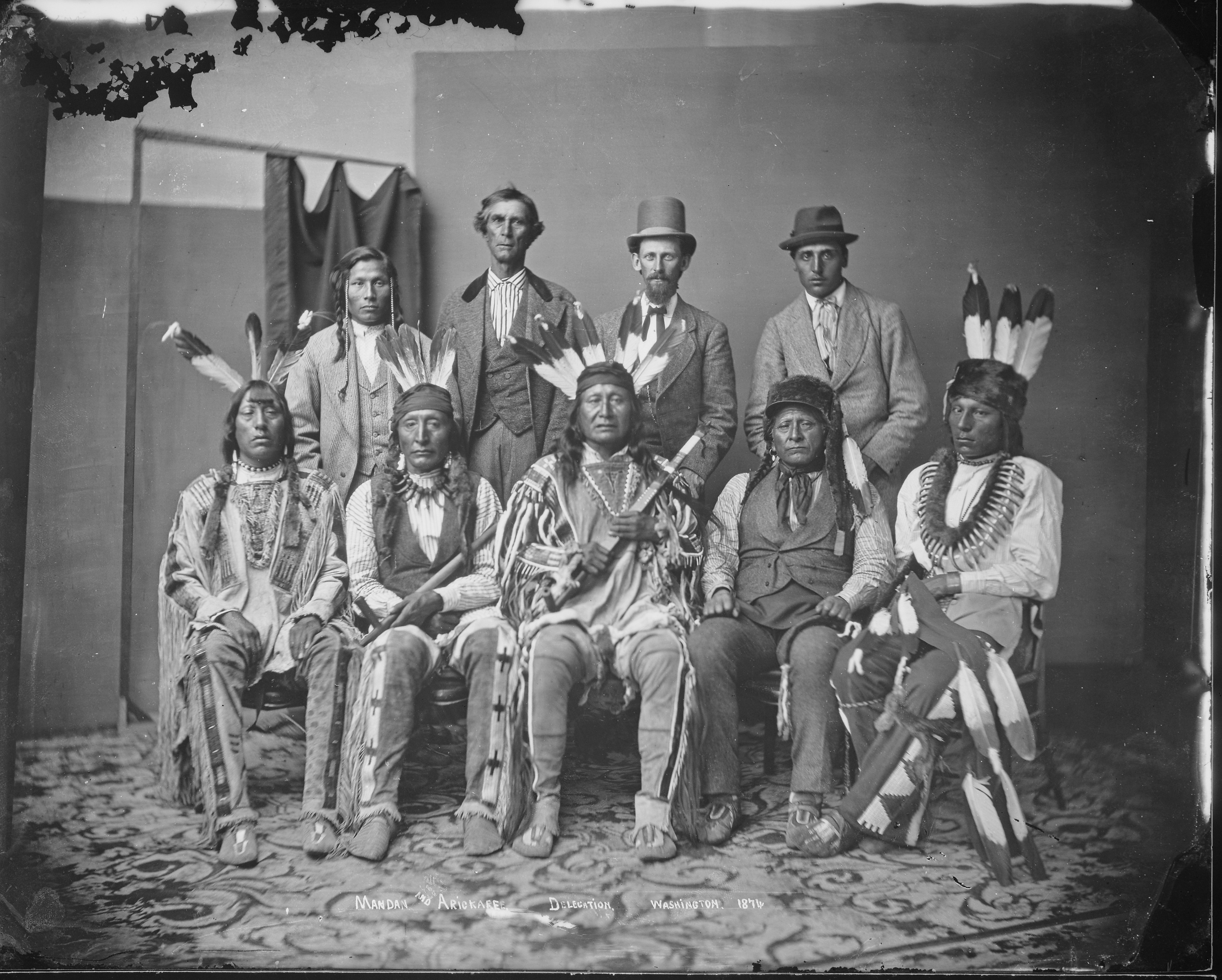
Mandan and Arikara delegation

- Arikara
- Pawnee

These may descend from the Central Plains tradition cultures (ca. 1000–1780 CE) who lived in southwest Iowa, especially around the present-day Glenwood area. The Pawnee (Panis) are shown in southwest Iowa on a 1798 map, although they ranged primarily to the west.

=== Algonquian-speaking peoples ===
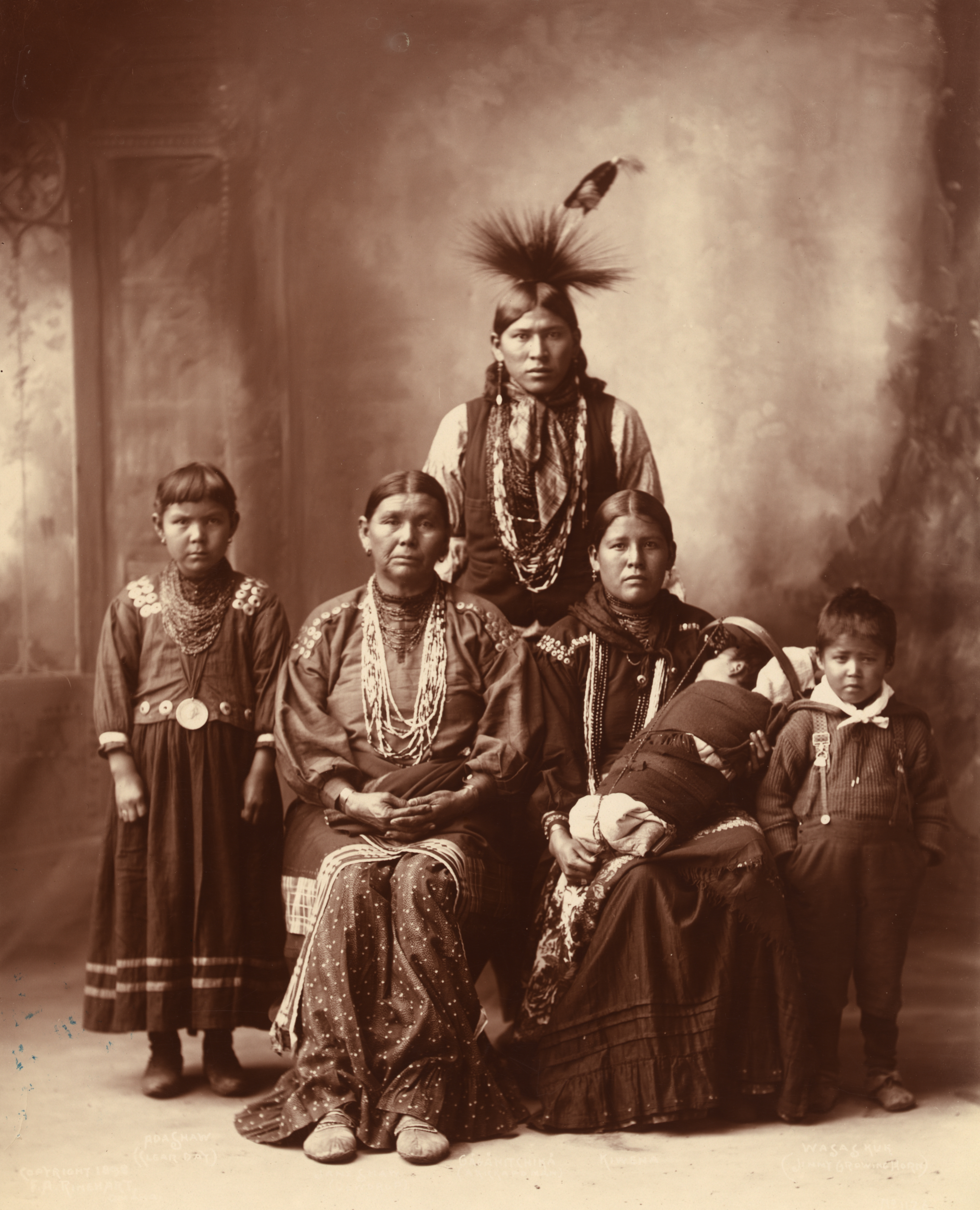
Sauk family, 1899

Tribes from the early contact period:

- Illinois Confederacy (including Moingona, Peoria, and Piankashaw)
- Kickapoo. A subgroup occupied the Upper Iowa River region in the late 17th century and early 18th century. They may have been called the Mahouea.
- Mascouten
- Meskwaki (Fox)
- Sauk (Thâkînâwe)

The encroachment of Europeans and the Beaver Wars in the east pushed many tribes into the Midwest. Many Meskwaki remained in Iowa, even after Indian Removal in 1846. They established a recognized Settlement.

==== Anishinaabeg ====
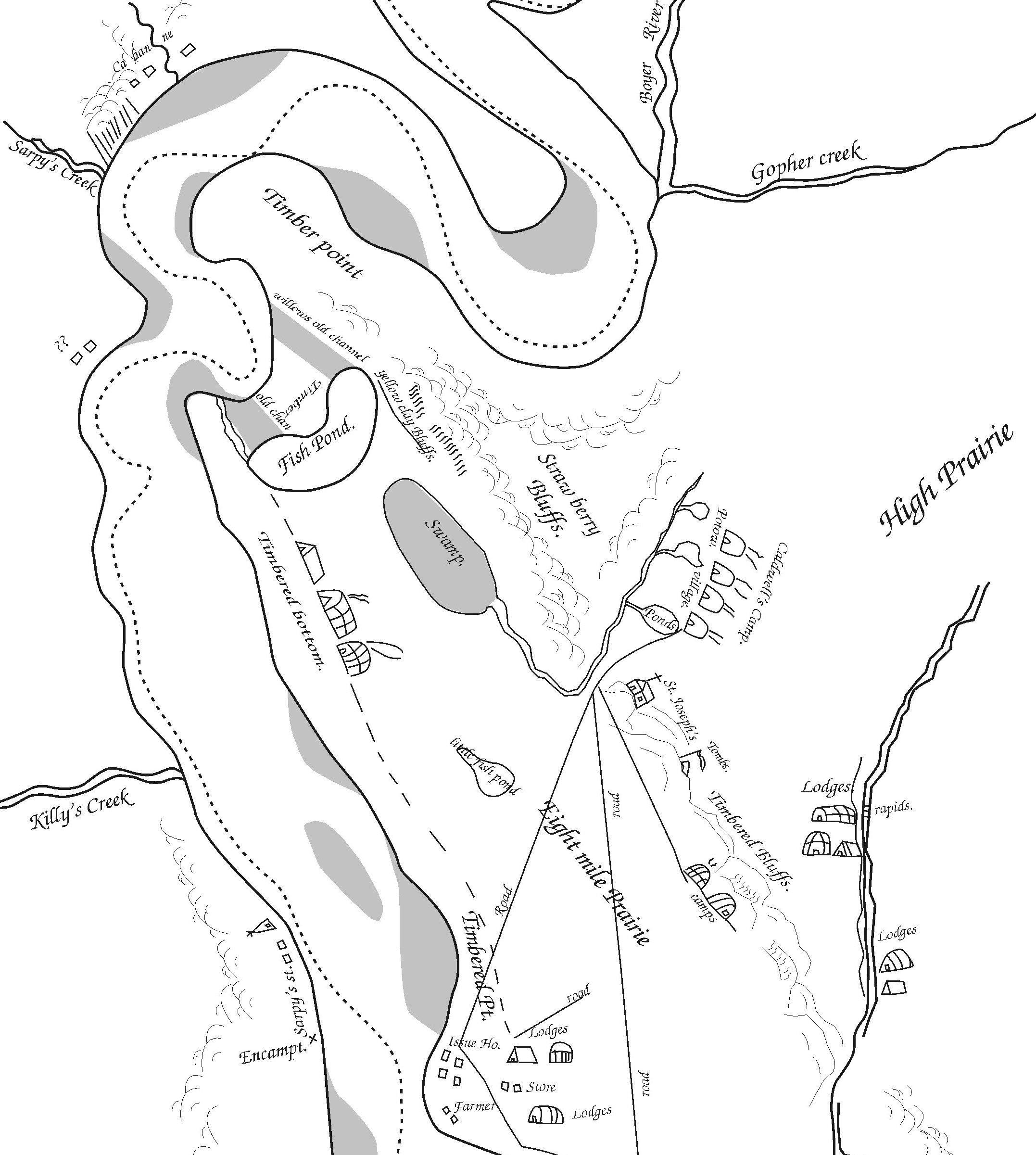
Pierre-Jean De Smet's map of the Council Bluffs, Iowa area, 1839. The area labeled 'Caldwell's Camp' was a Potawatomi village led by Sauganash. This was later developed as Council Bluffs.

These tribes moved to Iowa during the historic period:

- Potawatomi
- Ojibwe (Chippewa)
- Odawa (Ottawa)

The forced relocation of tribes in the 19th century from east of the Mississippi led to some eastern tribes living in and near Iowa. Their former territory had been around the Great Lakes. Potawatomi Chief Sauganash founded the village that eventually grew into Council Bluffs.

=== Wyandots ===
The Wyandot are an Iroquoian people that formed primarily from Tionontati refugees in the early post-contact period. The encroachment of Europeans and wars with the Haudenosaunee during the Beaver Wars pushed the Wyandots into the Midwest.

=== Apache and Comanche ===
Plains Apache and Comanche traveled through the region from the 17th century to 19th century.

== Indian settlements and claimed lands in Iowa ==
- Meskwaki Settlement, Iowa
- Blackbird Bend

== Modern times ==
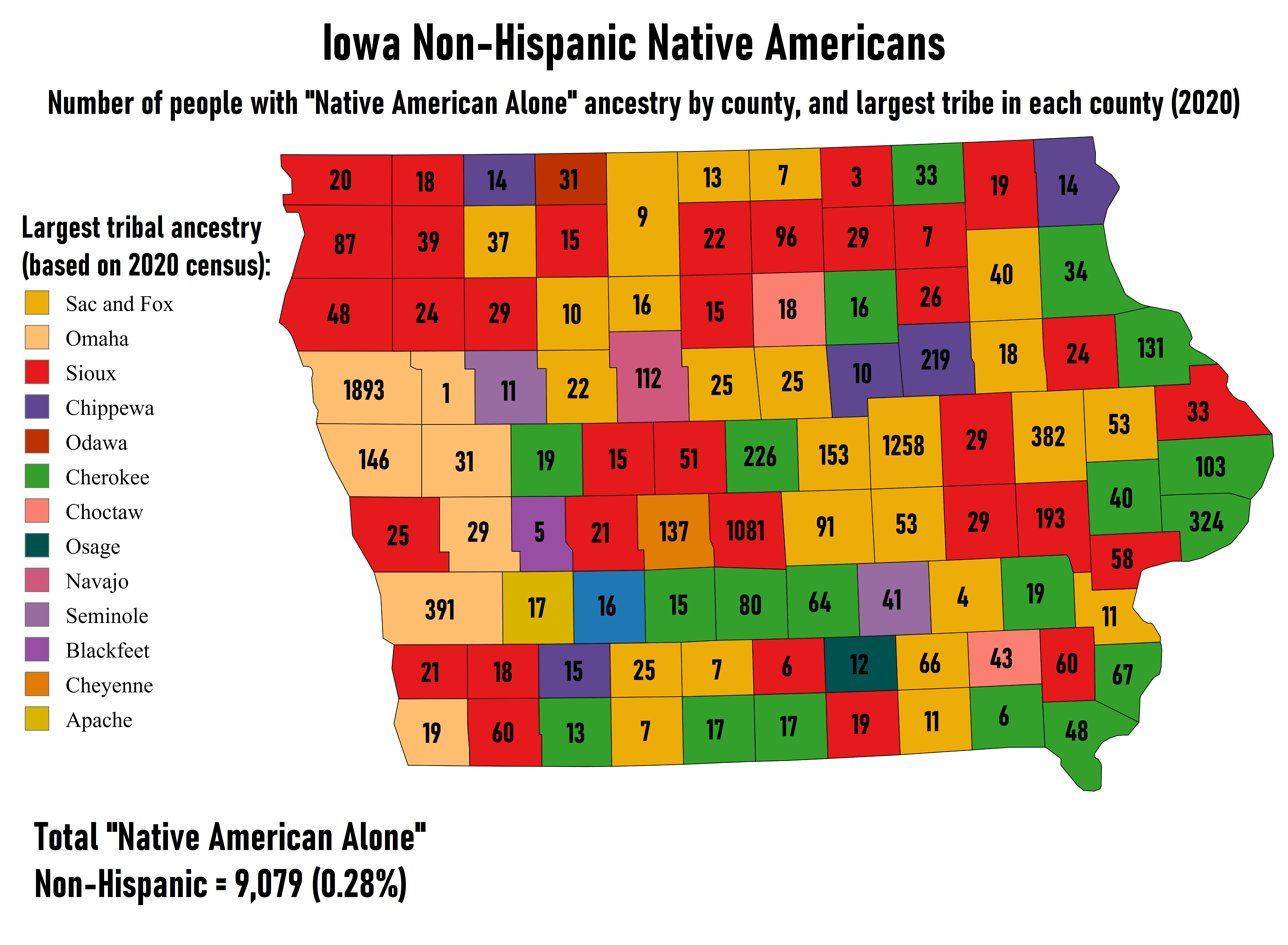
Largest Non-Hispanic Native American ancestry by county and numbers of people reporting "Native American Alone"

Today the only federally recognized tribe in Iowa is the Sac and Fox Tribe of the Mississippi in Iowa (also known as the Meskwaki Nation). The Foxes first moved into Iowa after 1804, and by the time of the Black Hawk War all were gathered there. In 1842 they left their Iowa lands and moved to Kansas together with the Sauk. But between 1850 and 1859 some Foxes and Sauk returned from Kansas to Iowa and bought a tract of land near Tama, where they established a settlement and have lived ever since. Apart from the Sac and Fox, there are also many Native American people living in Iowa who identify as Sioux, Ho-Chunk, Omaha, Chippewa, and few more tribes.

In the 2020 United States census, in total 14,486 people in Iowa identified as being Native American alone (including Hispanic Natives), and 41,472 did in combination with one or more other races.

== Notable Indians who lived in Iowa ==
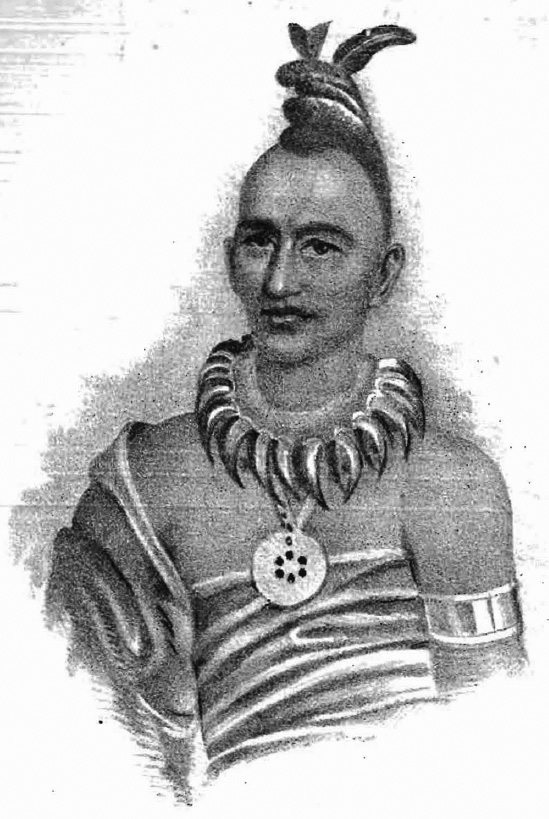
Taimah (Chief Tama)

- Appanoose
- Antonine Barada (White Horse)
- Black Hawk
- Douglas Spotted Eagle
- Inkpaduta
- Keokuk
- Mahaska "White Cloud"
- Neapope
- Maria Pearson
- Poweshiek
- Quashquame
- John Raymond Rice
- Sauganash (Billy Caldwell)
- Sidominadota
- Taimah (Tama)
- Wabansi
- Wapello
- Watseka
- Ray Young Bear
- Notchininga "No Heart"
