= Meskwaki Casino =

Casino hotel in Tama, Iowa

- Interactive map of Meskwaki Casino
- Location: Meskwaki Settlement, Iowa; 1504 305th Street; 41.9959°N 92.6685°W
- Opened: 1992
- Theme: Meskwaki culture
- No. of rooms: 404
- Gaming space: 67,000 square feet (6,200 m^{2})
- Notable restaurants: Prime Cut Grill, Jackpot Buffet, Luckys Grill and Taproom
- Casino type: Land-based
- Owner: Sac and Fox Tribe of the Mississippi in Iowa

Meskwaki Casino is a Native American casino and hotel located on the Meskwaki Settlement in Tama County, Iowa. It is owned and operated by the Sac and Fox Tribe of the Mississippi in Iowa, and opened in 1992.

== Property ==
The casino consists of 67,000 square feet (6,200 m^{2}) of gaming space, filled by tables for stud poker, blackjack, craps, baccarat, roulette, hold 'em, and others. It also features slot machines, keno, bingo, and the sportsbook. The casino abuts a 404-room resort hotel.
