= Jean Adeline Morgan Wanatee =

Native American and women's rights activist

- Born: December 9, 1910; Meskwaki Settlement
- Died: October 15, 1996 (aged 85)
- Alma mater: Haskell Indian Nations University
- Occupation: Textile artist
- Awards: Iowa Women's Hall of Fame (1993)

Jean Adeline Morgan Wanatee (December 9, 1910 – October 15, 1996) was a Meskwaki activist for Native American and women's rights. Wanatee was an artist and tribal leader dedicated to preserving and sharing the traditional culture and language of the Meskwaki. She was the first woman elected to the Meskwaki Tribal Council and the first Native American to be inducted into the Iowa Women's Hall of Fame.

== Early life and education ==
Jean Adeline Morgan was born on December 9, 1910, on the Meskwaki Settlement near Tama, Iowa. She was a member of the Wolf clan; her parents were Earl Morgan and Annie Waseskuk Morgan. Her father died when she was nine months old; she and her mother moved in with her grandmother until her mother remarried. She was known by friends as "Adeline".

Adeline attended the Sac and Fox Day School until 1923, when she was sent to a government boarding school, the Flandreau Indian School on the Flandreau Indian Reservation in South Dakota. In the eighth grade she returned to attend public schools in Tama. She went on to earn a degree from the Haskell Institute in 1931.

In her late teens, she worked for two years at the Toledo Sanatorium.

She married Frank David Wanatee in 1932; they had nine children, though two died as young children.

== Later life ==
When she returned to Iowa after graduating from the Haskell Institute, Wanatee worked at the Sac and Fox Day School, teaching sewing, cooking, art, and the Meskwaki language. After her own experience of being sent to a distant boarding school, she believed that Native American children should be educated close to home, and worked on state and national committees to prevent Native children from routinely being sent to assimilationist boarding schools. She served as the chair of the school board of the Meskwaki, and she was a founding member of the Coalition of Indian-Controlled School Boards, an organization dedicated to parental and community control of Indian education. She also wrote a chapter titled "Education, the Family, and the Schools" in the 1978 book The Worlds Between Two Rivers: Perspectives on American Indians in Iowa.

Wanatee served as a resource for scholars interested in traditional Meskwaki culture, language, and art, including work as a Meskwaki language specialist for the Smithsonian Institution. She helped create an elementary school textbook for the Meskwaki language. She was a member of the Iowa Arts Council's "artist-in-the-schools" program, teaching traditional Meskwaki weaving to members of the community. Her artwork included appliqué and ribbon work, and her specialty was weaving yarn sashes with a traditional finger-weaving (warp face braiding) technique.

Wanatee was the first woman elected to the Meskwaki Tribal Council, where she served two four-year terms. She was also the first woman to be a part of the Meskwaki Pow Wow Association. She had multiple roles in promoting the health of Native Americans, including serving as a tribal health representative and being appointed as a delegate for the National Indian Council on Aging. Wanatee established a center for community health and nutrition for members of the Meskwaki Nation.

She died in Tama on October 15, 1996, and was buried in the Meskwaki Cemetery.

== Recognition ==
In 1993, she became the first Native American to be inducted as a member of the Iowa Women's Hall of Fame.

A park near Marion, Iowa was renamed in 2020 from Squaw Creek Park to Wanatee Park in honor of Wanatee's activism. It was the first instance of a public space in Iowa renamed to recognize Indigenous Iowans.

In 2020, the editors of USA Today published the "Women of the Century" project in commemoration of the 19th Amendment, asking experts from each state to identify ten women who made significant accomplishments in the period of 1920 to 2020. Wanatee was one of the ten women recognized for their important work within the state of Iowa.
