= Duane Slick =

Native American painter and professor (born 1961)

- Born: 1961 (age 64–65); Waterloo, Iowa, U.S.
- Citizenship: Sac and Fox Tribe of the Mississippi in Iowa, and U.S.
- Education: University of Northern Iowa; University of California, Davis
- Occupations: Artist, Professor

Duane Slick (born 1961) is a Meskwaki artist and educator of Ho-Chunk descent. He is known for his work influenced by his heritage, and for his series of prints and paintings depicting coyotes – a trickster character in Native cultures.

== Early life and education ==
Duane Slick was born 1961 in Waterloo, Iowa, to a Meskwaki father and a Ho-Chunk mother.

He received a BFA degree in painting and a BA degree in Art Education from the University of Northern Iowa in 1986. Slick completed an MFA degree in 1990 in painting from the University of California, Davis. While at UC Davis, he was mentored by artist George Longfish. He previously taught at Institute of American Indian Arts (IAIA) in Santa Fe, New Mexico, from 1992 to 1995. Since 1995, Slick has taught printmaking and painting at Rhode Island School of Design (RISD).

== Work ==
The image of a coyote head as well as its shadow has become his "signature leitmotif" in his paintings and prints. Slick has stated that by "depicting coyote’s shadow, he returns metaphysical autonomy to a folk art object drained of its original intention through capitalism."

He has taught fine arts at Rhode Island School of Design (RISD) since 1995.

In 2010, he was a resident at School for Advanced Research (SAR), where he created his work Field Mouse Goes to War. In 2012, Slick was awarded the Eiteljorg Contemporary Art Fellowship, and his work was included in the associated group exhibition, We Are Here!.

His first solo museum exhibition, The Coyote Makes the Sunset Better, premiered in 2022 at The Aldrich Contemporary Art Museum.

Slick was also a co-curator of Marking Resilience: Indigenous North American Prints, a 2023 exhibition staged by the Museum of Fine Arts, Boston.

== Collections ==
Slick's work is included in several public art collections including the National Museum of American History at the Smithsonian Institution, Milwaukee Art Museum, Chazen Museum of Art, Danforth Art Museum, and the Des Moines Art Center, among others.
