= Ska-ba-quay Tesson =

Native American artist (c. 1846–1929)

- Born: Ska-ba-quay Tesson c. 1846
- Died: 1929
- Other names: A Ski Ba Qua, Mrs. Joseph Tesson
- Known for: Textile art, twined storage bags
- Notable work: Yarn bag (c. 1900) in the National Museum of the American Indian collection
- Style: Traditional Meskwaki weaving incorporating new designs
- Spouse: Joseph Tesson

Ska-ba-quay Tesson (c. 1846 – 1929, also known as A Ski Ba Qua, Mrs. Joseph Tesson, or Ash-Que-Pac-Qua) was a Meskwaki artist who is known for her textile art. Living during a tumultuous transitional period for the Meskwaki nation, Tesson helped maintain and innovate on the practice of textile bags and designs. Tesson’s bag is currently in the collection of the Museum of the American Indian, part of the Smithsonian Institution.

== Biography ==
Tesson was born around 1846 and was part of the Meskwaki group of Native Americans. It is unknown where she spent her youth. During that period, the Meskwaki were in the process of reclaiming their homeland in Iowa, a process that would continue over the next several decades. When museum collectors purchased items from her in the late nineteenth and early twentieth centuries, she was living in Tama, Iowa. In addition to her art, Tesson acted as a cultural informant for anthropologists studying her people.

At an unknown date, Tesson met and married Joseph Tesson, Jr. Of mixed Iowa and French descent, Mr. Tesson was a member of the Meskwaki tribal council as well as an interpreter. Together the Tessons were prominent individuals within the Meskwaki community. They remained married until Mr. Tesson’s death in 1921.

Mrs. Tesson died in 1926 in Meskwakiinaki, Iowa.

== Work ==
Tesson specialized in traditional Meskwaki textile styles and techniques, while also incorporating new ideas and materials. Such bags had long been common productions among various indigenous communities in North America, predating the arrival of the Europeans. Textile bags served as both practical storage and cultural expression through woven images. Tesson helped revitalize the art after a period of decline, in part by adopting new motifs, styles, and components.

Her textile work consisted of twined storage bags that had a tapestry-like appearance. Her work was based on traditional methods of weaving using nettle fiber and buffalo wool, but also incorporated new designs. Her style included colorful bands and repeating images of Meskwaki figures, including men and horses. Tesson also made bags using buckskin, porcupine quills, and nettle fibers. Later, she incorporated wool yarns and cotton string when these materials became more accessible and affordable.

Tesson’s textiles featured a combination of styles and images. Her bags featured both geometric shapes and symbolic representations of animals, humans, and spiritual beings. In addition to integrated patterns, Tesson also mixed multiple subjects into singular works. Many of her works contained images of supernatural beings from Meskwaki folklore, including thunderbirds and underwater panthers. At the same time, Tesson inserted elements specific to the time and place she lived in. Horses and their riders were common motifs in her textiles, despite horses being a relatively recent introduction to indigenous societies in North America. Such figures were typically repeated multiple times in between lines and geometric shapes.

Tesson’s textiles were popular among both fellow Meskwaki and American collectors. They visualized Meskwaki culture and society. This made them sought after by those interested in indigenous cultures. However, like many other Native American art pieces, Tesson’s textiles were rarely credited to her as an individual, with many pieces being collected and presented as examples as the Meskwaki cultural tradition as a whole.

Tesson's most well-known work, a yarn bag dating to circa 1900, currently resides in the collection of the National Museum of the American Indian in New York City. In 2010, it was attributed specifically to her, rather than to her tribal affiliation as had previously been the case.
