= Vivia B. Appleton =

American physician and academic; 1879–1978)

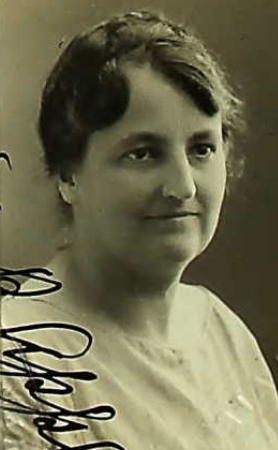
- Vivia Belle Appleton's 1924 passport photo
- Born: Vivia Belle Appleton; May 31, 1879; Tama, Iowa
- Died: October 23, 1978 (aged 99); Honolulu, Hawaii
- Occupations: Physician, academic

Vivia Belle Appleton (May 31, 1879 – October 23, 1978) was an American physician, specializing in pediatrics. She worked in San Francisco, in France during World War I, in Labrador, in Shanghai, and in Hawaii.

== Early life and education ==
Vivia Belle Appleton was born in Tama, Iowa, the daughter of Richard Westcott Appleton and Cora A. (Birdsell) Appleton. Her father was a doctor; her stepfather was federal judge Seba Cormany Huber. She attended Rockford College and Cornell University, where she earned a bachelor's degree in 1901.

She completed her medical degree at Johns Hopkins School of Medicine in 1906, and in 1929 she completed a master's degree in public health, also at Johns Hopkins. Johns Hopkins University gave Appleton a Medallion Award in 1956, as an outstanding alumna. In 1973 she created the Richard Westcott Appleton Scholarship at Johns Hopkins, in memory of her father.

== Career ==
Appleton served internships at the New England Hospital for Women and Children and Babies Hospital in New York, as part of her training. She taught pediatrics at the University of California hospital in San Francisco. While based in San Francisco, she spoke at an American Red Cross "better babies" event in Stockton. During World War I, she joined her California colleague William Palmer Lucas in France, to work with the American Red Cross Bureau of Child Welfare.

In 1919 Appleton took an assignment from the national board of the Young Women's Christian Association (YWCA) to establish a pediatric clinic and health education programs in Forteau, Labrador. She worked for three years (1921 to 1924) in Shanghai, where she learned to speak Mandarin while promoting public health and nutrition programs for the YWCA's Council of Health Education. While in China, she conducted anthropometric research on school children, in cooperation with Russian anthropologist S. M. Shirokogoroff. She continued that work after 1925, when she became director of the Hawaiian Board of Health's Division of Infancy and Maternity. She organized 68 local clinics before she was dismissed from that job in 1927.

Appleton stayed in Hawaii for the rest of her career, served on the territory's National Recovery Administration board in 1933, was a member of the territory's Board of Industrial Schools in 1938 and 1939, and taught at the University of Hawai‘i at Mānoa.

In 1946, she was president of the Pan-Pacific Women's Association. In 1956, she and her sister gave $25,000 to establish scholarships at Lebanon Valley College in memory of their mother and stepfather. She wrote about her experiences in A Doctor's Letters from China Fifty Years Ago (1976).

== Personal life ==
Appleton died at her home in Honolulu, aged 99, in 1978. Her papers are housed in the University of Hawai‘i at Mānoa Library.
