= Lelah Pekachuk =

Meskwaki woman (1881–1901)

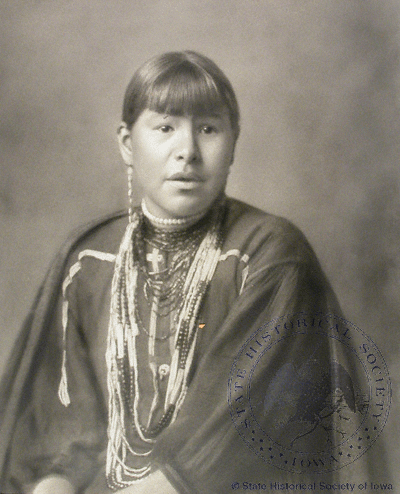
Portrait of Lelah Puckachee

Lelah Puckachee (c. 1881 – 1901) was a Meskwaki woman who successfully challenged her detention in the Toledo Indian School in Toledo, Iowa, a boarding school for Native American children and young adults from neighboring communities. She was raised in the Sac and Fox Tribe of the Mississippi in Iowa.

== Legal battles with the Toledo Indian School ==
Puckachee attended the Toledo Indian School beginning on September 1, 1899. Her mother, Na-wau-ke-kee, was reluctant to enroll Puckachee in the boarding school and negotiated for her daughter's leave to support the harvest. When Puckachee failed to return, superintendent George Nellis and Meskwaki Indian agent, W.G. Malin, kidnapped Puckachee and forcibly brought her to the boarding school.

Several days later, Puckachee ran away from the Toledo Indian School with a companion, Mas-kwa-see. Back home, she married Ta-ta-pi-cha on October 29, 1899. A week later, during a visit to Toledo, Iowa to be a witness in a trial, Puckachee was abducted again and brought to the boarding school. During her incarceration, she was held "in an upper cell or room of said training school." Multiple reports emerged of her confinement and detainment.

In November 1899, a group of Meskwaki men and E.I. Wilcox traveled to Des Moines, Iowa and petitioned governor of Iowa L. M. Shaw for Puckachee's release. After Shaw declined to assist, Wilcox filed for a writ of habeas corpus for Puckachee in the United States District Court for the Northern District of Iowa. While judge Oliver Perry Shiras denied the writ, he found parental consent was necessary for boarding school enrollment, and based his decision on the 1881 case Young v. Imoda. Puckachee was released from the Toledo Indian School after Shiras' December 29, 1899 ruling.

Puckachee died of smallpox in November 1901, one of many victims of the small pox epidemics that swept the United States at the turn of the last century.

== Legacy ==
After Puckachee's release, other Meskwaki families immediately took their children out of the Toledo Indian School.

Puckachee's legal case prompted Secretary of the Interior James Rudolph Garfield to submit a draft of proposed legislation to Congress in 1909. The proposed legislation would change the Act of March 2, 1895 (28 Stat. L., 906) to make it more difficult for Meskwaki parents to challenge boarding school removals.
