= Ray Young Bear =

Native American poet and novelist

Ray Young Bear (born 1950 in Marshalltown, Iowa) is a Meskwaki poet and novelist. He was raised on the Meskwaki Tribal Settlement in Tama County, Iowa. He writes about contemporary Native Americans in English and in Meskwaki. The theme of his poems and other works are Native Americans' search for identity. His poems express the painful awareness of identity loss.

Young Bear's great-great grandfather, Maminwanike, purchased the land that the Meskwaki Settlement was built on. The settlement is located along the Iowa River. Young Bear's great-great grandfather was only a boy when he made the decision to move the tribe from Kansas back to Iowa where the tribe is originally from. After his great-great grandfather's decision, Meskwaki people were sent in 1857 to negotiate the purchase of land that eventually became the Meskwaki Settlement. It is in this way that the Meskwaki Tribe that Young Bear is a part of is unique. The Meskwaki Tribe is one of very few tribes that bought their land instead of having their land allotted to them by the government.

== Early life and education ==
Ray Young Bear was born in Marshalltown, Iowa, and raised on the Meskwaki Tribal Settlement in Iowa. It is unique as a place where in 1857 the Meskwaki bought land privately for the tribe, like other citizens, authorized by state legislation.

Ray Young Bear was raised by his maternal grandmother, No-ko-me-sa, for the first ten years of his life. Young Bear spoke Meskwaki as his first language, taught by his maternal grandmother; she also encouraged him to learn English. He was not comfortable in this language until late in high school. She was also a key teacher of his culture, its customs, and its myths and belief systems, which he embraces. He has been influenced as a writer through his grandmother who he claims is his greatest influence. Other influences that Ray Young Bear attributes his writing to are the journals of his grandfathers that date back to the early 1800s. Young Bear believes that writing is in his blood.

As a youth, Young Bear attended an Upward Bound program at Luther College in Decorah, Iowa. Young Bear also attended the University of Iowa and Grinnell College. Later he met poet Robert Bly, who was very influential. Through Robert Bly, Young Bear was able to meet with many editors that ultimately led to his work getting published. Young Bear also studied at Pomona College between 1969 and 1971, where he took advantage of the chance to hear readings by visiting poets. Ray Young Bear has taught creative writing as well as Native American Literature at The Institute of American Indian Art, Eastern Washington University, Meskwaki Indian Elementary School, the University of Iowa, and Iowa State University.

== Literary career ==
Young Bear first wrote poetry in Meskwaki and began to translate his work into English, publishing his first poem in 1968. His first audience that he considers while writing is his own tribal members. He always keeps his grandmother in mind while writing. He said, "My grandmother was always giving me advice on how I should watch what I say, because she would say that the single word itself is very, very powerful."

He writes about the dislocation of contemporary Native Americans who are pulled by two different cultures. He has written some prose fiction, but says that "all his writing is merely experiments with words" (Kratzert 1998). His novels, starting with Black Eagle Child (1992), describe his youth through the character of Edgar Bearchild. They combine first-person narrative, letters, religious imagery, and poetry. He often switches between English and the Meskwaki language to express himself more fully.

== Woodland Drum Group ==
Ray Young Bear helped form the Woodland Drum Group. Members of the group include: Todd and Russell Young Bear who are Ray's brothers, Ray's nephew Elgin Young Bear, wife Stella Young Bear, Brother-in-law Gordon Lasley, and Clark and Eloise Lasley. Young Bear and his family formed the Woodland Drum Group in 1983 to entertain other Native Americans by participating in tribal celebrations. The group first performed in 1984. The group has performed over 250 times throughout the United States, Canada, and Netherlands. The group performs songs and dances to Native Americans and non-Native American audiences. The goal of the Woodland Drum Group is to educate non-Native Americans about the meaning behind the dances and songs of Native Americans.

== Awards ==
- Creative Writing Grant from the National Endowment for the Arts (1976)
- Honorary Doctorate in letters from Luther College, Decorah, Iowa (1993)
- Ruth Suckow Award for Remnants of the First Earth (1997)

== Works ==
Young Bear's work has appeared in numerous magazines, including American Poetry Review, Gettysburg Review, The Georgia Review, The Kenyon Review, Michigan Quarterly Review, Parnassus, Ploughshares, and Virginia Quarterly Review.

=== Poetry ===
==== Collections ====
- Grandmother (1975)
- Winter of the Salamander (1980)
- The Invisible Musician (1990)
- The Rock Island Hiking Club (2001)
- The Aura of the Blue Flower That is a Goddess (2001)

==== List of poems ====
Title	Year	First published	Reprinted/collected
Four hinterland abstractions	2015	Young Bear, Ray (August 3, 2015). "Four hinterland abstractions". The New Yorker. Vol. 91, no. 22. pp. 36–37.	

=== Fiction ===
- Black Eagle Child (1992)
- Remnants of the First Earth (1996)

=== List of Anthologies Containing Ray's Work ===
- Uncommon Wealth: An Anthology of Poetry in English
- The Best American Poetry 1996
- Against Forgetting: Twentieth-Century Poetry of Witness
- New Worlds of Literature: Writings from America's Many Cultures
- Columbus & Beyond: Views from Native Americans
- The Remembered Earth: An Anthology of Contemporary Native American Literature
- Harper's Anthology of 20th Century Native American Poetry
- Songs from This Earth on Turtle's Back: An Anthology of Poetry by American Indian Writers
- Words in the Blood: Contemporary Indian Writers of North and South America
- Voices of the Rainbow: Contemporary Poetry by Native Americans
- Nothing but the Truth: An Anthology of Native American Literature

== See also ==
- Official Ray Young Bear site
