= Meskwaki Settlement, Iowa =

Meskwakiinaki, a Native American settlement in Iowa

Meskwaki Settlement, Iowa Meskwakiinaki (Meskwaki)
- Indian settlement
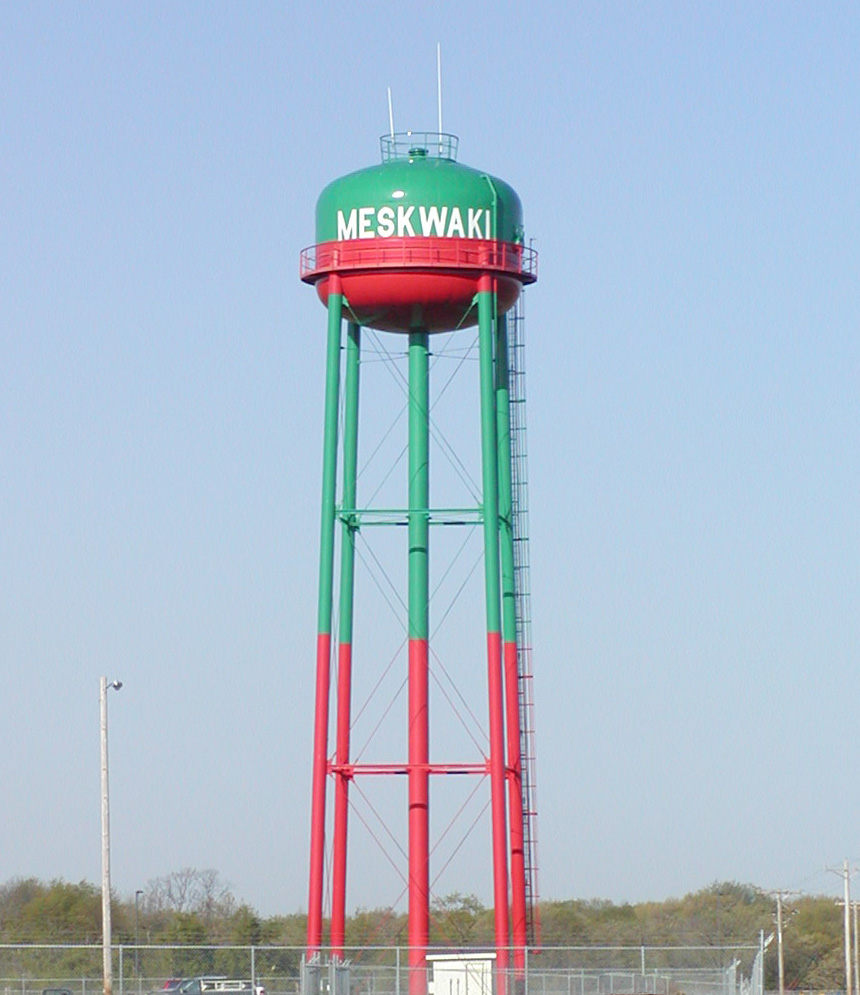
- Water tower, Meskwaki Settlement

- Location within Iowa
- Coordinates: 41°58′45″N 92°38′40″W
- Tribe: Sac and Fox Tribe of the Mississippi in Iowa
- Country: United States
- State: Iowa
- County: Tama

Area
  - Total: 10.34 sq mi (26.8 km^{2})
  - Land: 10.34 sq mi (26.8 km^{2})
- Elevation: 899 ft (274 m)

Population (2020)
  - Total: 1,142
  - Density: 110/sq mi (42.6/km^{2})
- Time zone: UTC-6 (Central (CST))
  - Summer (DST): UTC-5 (CDT)
- Area code: 641
- GNIS feature ID: 463420

Meskwaki
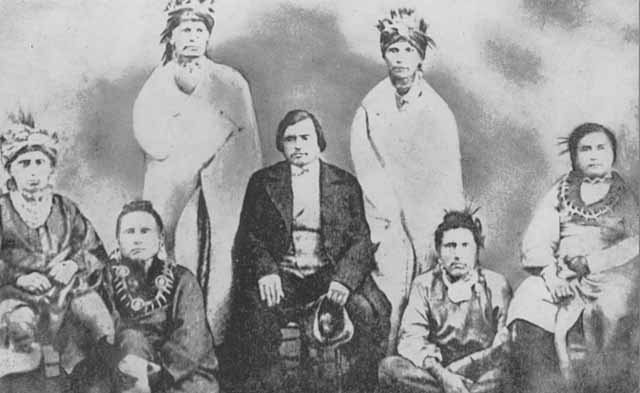
- "Mesquakie Indians responsible for the establishment of the Mesquakie Settlement," 1857 photograph.

Total population
- Enrolled members: 1,300

Regions with significant populations
- United States: Iowa

Languages
- English, Meskwaki

Religion
- Traditional religion (incl. syncretistic forms)

Related ethnic groups
- Sauk, Kickapoo

Meskwakiinaki, also called the Meskwaki Settlement, is an unincorporated community in Tama County, Iowa, United States, west of Tama. It encompasses the lands of the Meskwaki Nation (federally recognized as the Sac and Fox Tribe of the Mississippi in Iowa), one of three Sac and Fox tribes in the United States. The others are located in Oklahoma and Kansas. The settlement is located in the historic territory of the Meskwaki (Fox), an Algonquian people. Meskwaki people established the settlement in 1857 by privately repurchasing a small part of the land they had lost in the Sac and Fox treaty of 1842.

== Government ==
The Nation operates a tribal school, tribal courts, public works department, and police force. As of 2009, there were about 1,300 members of this Meskwaki Tribe, of whom about 800 live on the settlement; non-tribal members, including spouses, also live on the settlement.

The Meskwaki Casino Resort is located on the settlement and generates revenue for the welfare of the tribe. The tribe holds a large pow-wow at the settlement each year.

Legislation in 2018 restored the Meskwaki Nation's legal jurisdiction over tribal members within the settlement boundaries. The state of Iowa continues to exercise jurisdiction over pre-2018 legal cases and non-tribal citizens on tribal land.

The Meskwaki natural resource office has raised a herd of approximately twenty bison on the settlement's southern edge, mainly for cultural purposes, but has periodically distributed bison meat to families in the community. A community gardening project has also resulted from a partnership between federal AmeriCorps volunteers and the Meskwaki, titled the Meskwaki Food Sovereignty Initiative (MFSI).

== History ==
The Meskwaki traded with French colonists of the Illinois Country but were forced west by competition in the 18th-century fur trade and later United States development pressures. In the early decades of the 19th century, the Meskwaki and Sac were being forced to cede land in Iowa and nearby areas to the United States and to move west of the Missouri River, culminating in the Sac and Fox treaty of 1842. Some Meskwaki people resisted Indian removal, but they were initially unable to buy property because they were not considered citizens under Iowa law. In 1856, the Iowa state legislature passed a law permitting the Meskwaki to reside in Tama County, and Meskwaki people began to purchase land in 1857 with the state governor acting as a legal trustee. Over the following 150 years, the Meskwaki gradually expanded the settlement by purchasing nearby lands. The lands entered into federal trust in 1896. As the settlement was never formally incorporated as a city it has no official name, and was commonly called "Indian Town" or “Indian Village” into the 20th century. The anthropologist Duren Ward suggested the settlement be named "Meskwakia," but this name never caught on. The total lands owned by the tribe is called "Meskwakiinaki" by the Meskwaki tribal government. In the 21st century, there are two other federally recognized Sac and Fox tribes, who have independent reservations and governments in present-day states of Kansas, Oklahoma and Nebraska.

== Geography ==
The Meskwaki Nation owns more than 8,600 acres (35 km^{2}) in parts of Indian Village Township, Toledo Township, Tama Township, and Columbia Township. The settlement did not begin as an Indian reservation in the traditional sense, because it was privately purchased by Meskwaki people rather than being reserved by treaty or federal legislation. However, a portion of the area gained federal reservation status after 1896. According to the United States Census Bureau, 9.97 square miles (6,380 acres; 25.8 km^{2}) of the Meskwaki Settlement had legal reservation status in 2020, and an additional 0.37 square miles (240 acres; 0.96 km^{2}) were off-reservation trust land. The combined reservation and off-reservation trust land had a total area of 10.34 square miles (26.8 km^{2}), all of it land.

== Demographics ==
As of the census of 2020, the population of Meskwaki Settlement (including both reservation and off-reservation trust land) was 1,142. The population density was 110.5 inhabitants per square mile (42.7/km^{2}). There were 345 housing units at an average density of 33.4 per square mile (12.9/km^{2}). The racial makeup of the settlement was 85.9% Native American, 2.9% White, 0.3% Asian, 0.2% Black or African American, 0.3% from other races, and 10.5% from two or more races. Ethnically, the population was 8.8% Hispanic or Latino of any race.

== Education ==
The community is within the South Tama County Community School District.

There is also the Sac and Fox Tribe-operated Meskwaki Settlement School (MSS), a PK-12 school. It was formed in 1938 as a merger of two Native American day schools. Typically settlement students attend the tribal school or South Tama County High School.

== Notable Meskwaki ==
- Jean Adeline Morgan Wanatee, activist for Native American and women's rights
- Ray Young Bear, writer
- Lelah Pekachuk, successfully challenged her detention in the Toledo Indian School
