= Meskwaki =

Indigenous people of North America

Meshkwahkihaki
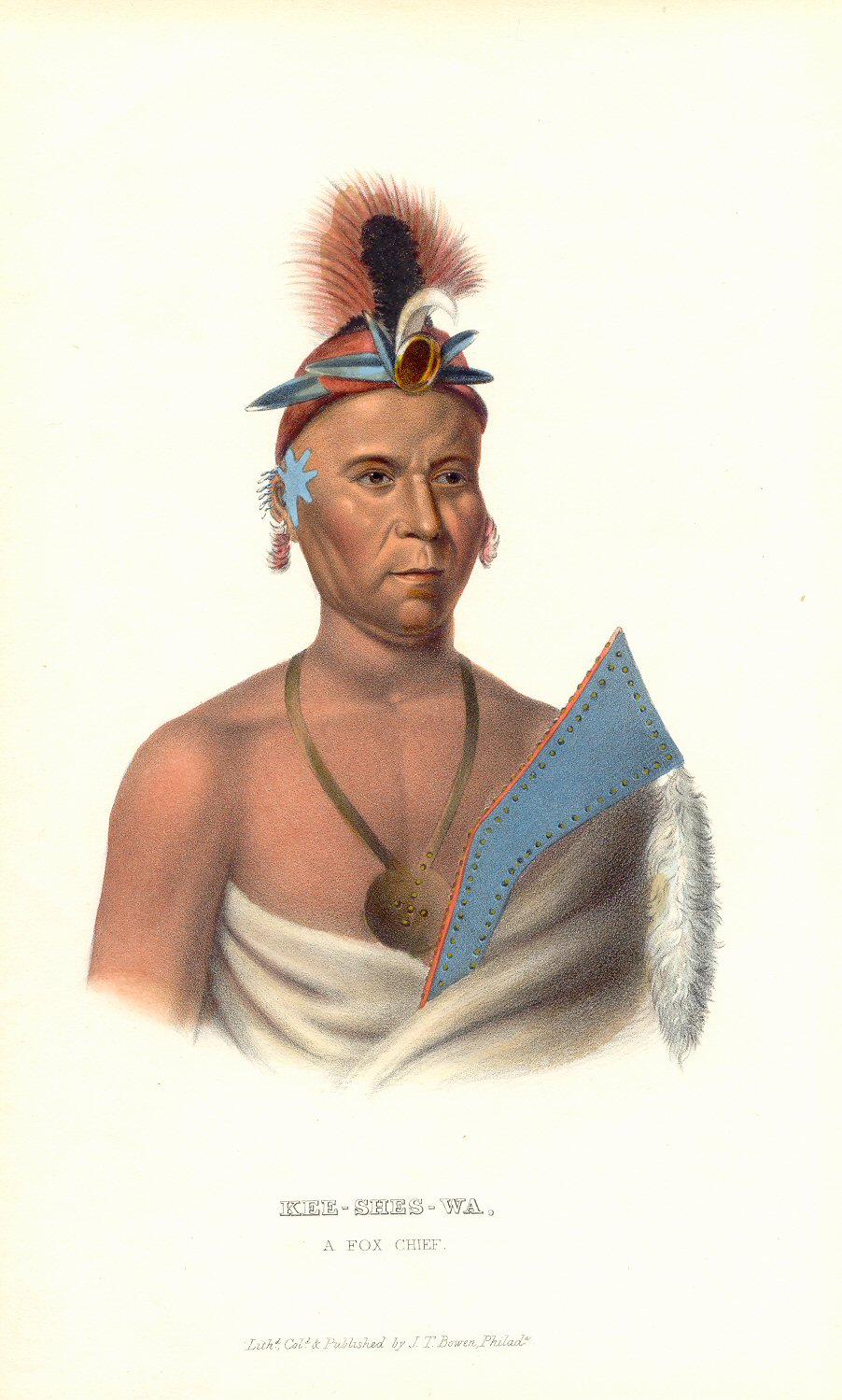
- "Kee-shes-wa, A Fox Chief", from History of the Indian Tribes of North America (1836–1844, three volumes)

Total population
- 6,500-10,000

Regions with significant populations
- formerly Michigan and Wisconsin, currently Iowa, Kansas, Nebraska, Oklahoma

Languages
- Meskwaki, English

Related ethnic groups
- Sauk, Kickapoo

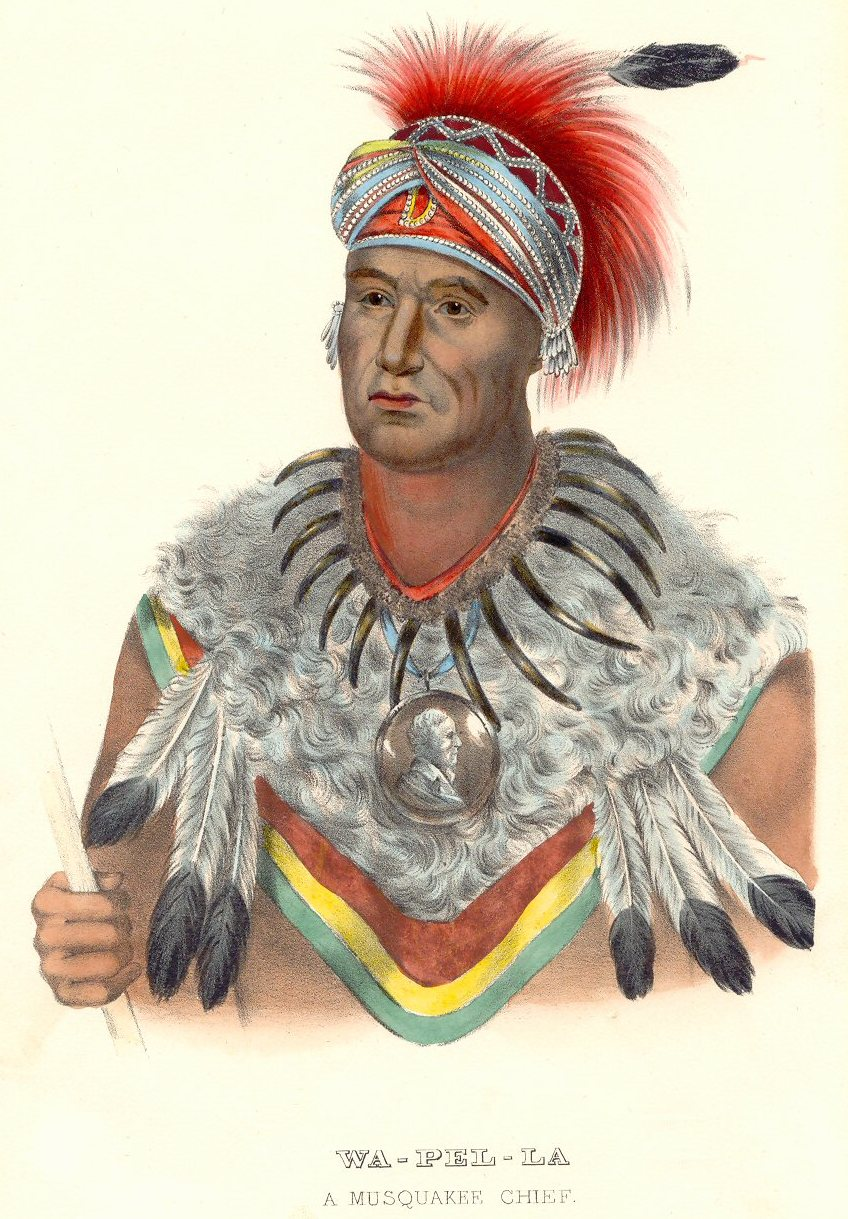
Chief Wapello; "Wa-pel-la the Prince, Musquakee Chief", from History of the Indian Tribes of North America

The Meskwaki (sometimes spelled Mesquaki), also known by the European exonyms Fox Indians or the Fox, are a Native American people. They have been closely linked to the Sauk (Sac) people of the same language family. In the Fox language, the Meskwaki call themselves Meshkwahkihaki, which means "the Red-Earths", related to their creation story.

The Meskwaki suffered damaging wars with the French and their Native American allies in the early 18th century, with one in 1730 decimating the tribe. Euro-American colonization and settlement proceeded in the United States during the 19th century and forced the Meskwaki south and west into the tallgrass prairie in the American Midwest. In 1851 the Iowa state legislature passed an unusual act to allow the Meskwaki to buy land and stay in the state. Other Sauk and Meskwaki were removed to Indian territory in what became Kansas, Oklahoma and Nebraska. In the 21st century, two federally recognized tribes of "Sac and Fox" have reservations, and one has a settlement.

== Etymology ==
The name is derived from the Meskwaki creation myth, in which their culture hero, Wisaka, created the first humans out of red clay. They called themselves Meshkwahkihaki in Meskwaki, meaning "the Red-Earths".

The name Fox later was derived from a French mistake during the colonial era: hearing a group of Indians identify as "Fox", the French applied what was a clan name to the entire tribe who spoke the same language by calling them "les Renards". Later the English and Anglo-Americans adopted the French name by using its translation in English as "Fox." This name was also used officially by the United States government from the 19th century.

== Ethnobotany ==
Historically the Meskwaki used Triodanis perfoliata as an emetic in tribal ceremonies to make one "sick all day long," smoking it at purification and other spiritual rituals. They smudge Symphyotrichum novae-angliae and use it to revive unconscious people. They used Agastache scrophulariifolia, an infusion of the root used as a diuretic, also using a compound of the plant heads medicinally. They eat the fruits of Viburnum prunifolium raw and cook them into a jam. They make the flowers of Solidago rigida into a lotion and use them on bee stings and for swollen faces. On the western side of the Mississippi River in Iowa, Meskwaki women searched for Amorpha canescens (prairie shoestring) as it sometimes foretold the presence of lead.

== History ==
Meskwaki signature of a fox on the Great Peace of Montreal

Meskwaki are of Algonquian origin from the prehistoric Woodland period culture area. The Meskwaki language is a dialect of the Sauk-Fox-Kickapoo language spoken by the Sauk, Meskwaki, and Kickapoo. It belongs to the Algic language family, and thus descended from Proto-Algic.

The Meskwaki and Sauk peoples are two distinct tribal groups. Linguistic and cultural connections between the two tribes have made them often associated in history. Under US government recognition treaties, officials treat the Sac (anglicized Sauk term) and Meskwaki as a single political unit, despite their distinct identities.

=== Great Lakes region ===
The Meskwaki gained control of the Fox River system in eastern and central Wisconsin. This river became vital for the colonial New France fur trade through the interior of North America between northern French Canada, via the Mississippi River, and the French ports on the Gulf of Mexico. As part of the Fox–Wisconsin Waterway, the Fox River allowed travel from Lake Michigan and the other Great Lakes via Green Bay to the Mississippi River system.

At first European contact in 1698, the French estimated the number of Meskwaki as about 6,500. By 1712, the number of Meskwaki had declined to 3,500.

==== Fox Wars ====
Fox chief.

The Meskwaki fought against the French, in what are called the Fox Wars, for more than three decades (1701–1742) to preserve their homelands. The Meskwaki resistance to French encroachment was highly effective. The King of France signed a decree in 1728, commanding the complete extermination of the Meskwaki.

The First Fox War with the French lasted from 1712 to 1714. This first Fox War was purely economic in nature, as the French wanted rights to use the river system to gain access to the Mississippi. After the Second Fox War of 1728, the Meskwaki were reduced to some 1,500 people. They found shelter with the Sauk, but French competition carried to that tribe. In the Second Fox War, the French increased their pressure on the tribe to gain access to the Fox and Wolf rivers. 900 Meskwaki (about 300 warriors and the remainder mostly women and children) tried to break out in Illinois to reach the English and Iroquois to the east, but they were greatly outnumbered by a combined force of French and hundreds of allied Native Americans. On September 9, 1730, most of the Meskwaki warriors were killed; many women and children were taken captive into Indian slavery or killed by the French allies.

=== Midwest region ===
The Sauk and Meskwaki allied in 1735 in defense against the French and their allied Indian tribes. Descendants spread through southern Wisconsin and along the present-day Illinois-Iowa border. By the mid-eighteenth century, Sauk and Meskwaki people had found refuge along the Des Moines and Wapsipinicon Rivers. They traveled back into Wisconsin but had returned to the northeastern corner of what would become Iowa by the 1780s and established towns along the Mississippi River. The Meskwaki set up on the western bank while the Sauk camped on the opposite side.

Meskwaki families lived off of seasonal hunting and agriculture enriched by the fur and mineral trades. They spent the spring and summer in small towns composed of large rectangular homes. In early spring, the Meskwaki tapped maple trees for sap, women planted gardens in the rich Iowa soil, and men hunted birds and fished in streams. Families left the village for a short summer hunt, harvesting elk and bison as the crops grew, and returned for the autumn harvest. The Meskwaki then divided into family groups and left for winter hunts, where they searched for deer and other game along the Mississippi tributaries. They would occupy mobile camps for months, resting in wickiups. According to writings by William Clark during the winter of 1804–1805, the Sauk and Meskwaki "raise[d] an abundance of corn, beans and melons: they sometimes hunted in the country west of them, towards the Missouri, but their principal hunting [was] on both sides of the Mississippi, from the mouth of the Wisconsin to the mouth of the Illinois river." By about 1800, the Meskwaki had recovered from only 200 survivors of the Fox Wars to a population of around 1,600. There are accounts of Meskwaki as far south as Pike County, Illinois.

The Anishinaabe peoples called the Meskwaki Odagaamii, meaning "people on the other shore", referring to their territories south of the Great Lakes. The French had adopted use of this name, and transliterated its spelling into their pronunciation system as Outagamie. This name was later used by Americans for today's Outagamie County, Wisconsin.

==== Kansas and Oklahoma ====
The Meskwaki and Sac were forced to leave their territory by American settlers. President Andrew Jackson signed the Indian Removal Act of 1830 passed by Congress, authorizing US removal of eastern American Indians to lands west of the Mississippi River. The act was directed mainly at the Five Civilized Tribes in the American Southeast, but it was also used against tribes in what was then called the Northwest as well, the area east of the Mississippi and north of the Ohio River.

Some Meskwaki were involved with Sac warriors in the Black Hawk War over homelands in Illinois. After the Black Hawk War of 1832, the United States officially combined the two tribes into a single group known as the Sac & Fox Confederacy for treaty-making purposes. The United States persuaded the Sauk and Meskwaki to sell all their claims to land in Iowa in a treaty of October 1842. They moved to land west of a temporary line (Red Rock Line) in 1843. They were removed to a reservation in east central Kansas in 1845 via the Dragoon Trace. The Dakota Sioux called the Meskwaki who moved west of the Mississippi River the "lost people" because they had been forced to leave their homelands. Some Meskwaki remained hidden in Iowa, with others returning within a few years. Soon after, the U.S. government forced the Sauk to a reservation in Indian Territory present-day Oklahoma.

==== Iowa ====
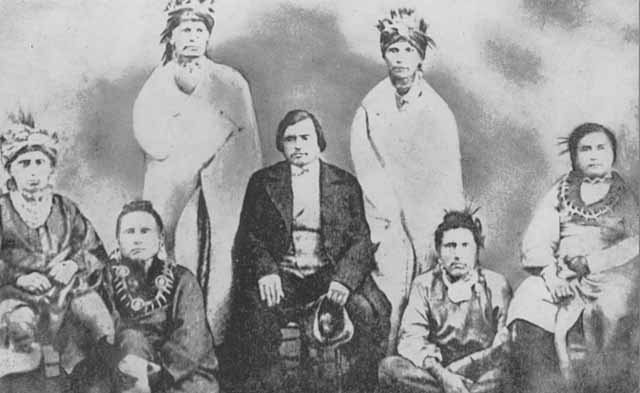
1857 photograph of the "Mesquakie Indians responsible for the establishment of the Meskwaki Settlement" in Tama County, Iowa

In 1851 the Iowa legislature passed an unprecedented act to allow the Meskwaki to buy land even though they had occupied it by right before and stay in the state. American Indians had not generally been permitted to do so, as the U.S. Government had said that tribal Indians were legally not US citizens. Only citizens could buy land.

In 1857, with money raised from selling crafts and stockpiling their treaty annuities, the Meskwaki were able to buy the first 80 acres (320,000 m^{2}) of their settlement in Tama County from the Butler Farm for US$1,000; Tama was named for Taimah, a Meskwaki chief of the early 19th century.

The U.S. government tried to force the tribe back to the Kansas reservation by withholding treaty-right annuities. Ten years later, in 1867, the U.S. finally began paying annuities to the Meskwaki in Iowa. They recognized the Meskwaki as the "Sac and Fox of the Mississippi in Iowa". The jurisdictional status was unclear. The tribe had formal federal recognition with eligibility for Bureau of Indian Affairs services. It also had a continuing relationship with the State of Iowa due to the tribe's private ownership of land, which was held in trust by the governor.

For the next 30 years, the Meskwaki were virtually ignored by federal as well as state policies, which generally benefited them. Subsequently, they lived more independently than tribes confined to Indian reservations regulated by federal authority. To resolve this jurisdictional ambiguity, in 1896 the State of Iowa ceded to the Federal government all jurisdiction over the Meskwaki.

=== 20th century ===
By 1910, the Sac and Meskwaki together totaled only about 1,000 people. During the 20th century, they began to recover their cultures. By the year 2000, their numbers had increased to nearly 4,000.

In World War II, Meskwaki men enlisted in the U.S. Army. Several served as code talkers, along with Navajo and some other speakers of uncommon languages. Meskwaki men used their language to keep Allied communications secret in actions against the Germans in North Africa. Twenty-seven Meskwaki men, then 16% of the Meskwaki population in Iowa, enlisted together in the U.S. Army in January 1941.

The modern Meskwaki Settlement in Tama County maintains a casino, tribal schools, tribal courts, tribal police and a public works department.

== Contemporary tribes ==
Today the three federally recognized Sac and Fox tribes are:

- Sac and Fox Nation, headquartered in Stroud, Oklahoma;
- Sac and Fox Tribe of the Mississippi in Iowa, headquartered in Tama, Iowa; and
- Sac and Fox Nation of Missouri in Kansas and Nebraska, headquartered in Reserve, Kansas.

== Notable Meskwaki ==
- Appanoose, chief
- Jean Adeline Morgan Wanatee, activist for Native American and women's rights; textile artist
- Ke-shes-wa, a Fox chief
- Lelah Pekachuk, woman abducted and forcibly brought to the Toledo Indian School in Toledo, Iowa
- Ray Young Bear, writer and poet
- Marie-Angélique Memmie Le Blanc, captured by French
- Duane Slick, artist
- Ska-ba-quay Tesson, artist
- Wapello, also featured in McKenney and Hall
- Mary Young Bear, inducted into the Iowa Women's hall of Fame; 2021
- Playing Fox, chief
- Andre Roberts, mixed martial arts fighter

== See also ==
- Iowa Tribe of Oklahoma
- Iowa Tribe of Kansas and Nebraska
- Indigenous peoples of the Eastern Woodlands
- Kickapoo
- Mascouten
- Native American tribes in Nebraska
- USS Appanoose (AK-226), a U.S. Navy ship named for Appanoose, a Meskwaki chief
- USS Wapello (YN-56), a U.S. Navy ship named for Wapello, a Meskwaki chief
- Mid-Continent Airlines
