= Tama, Iowa =

- City
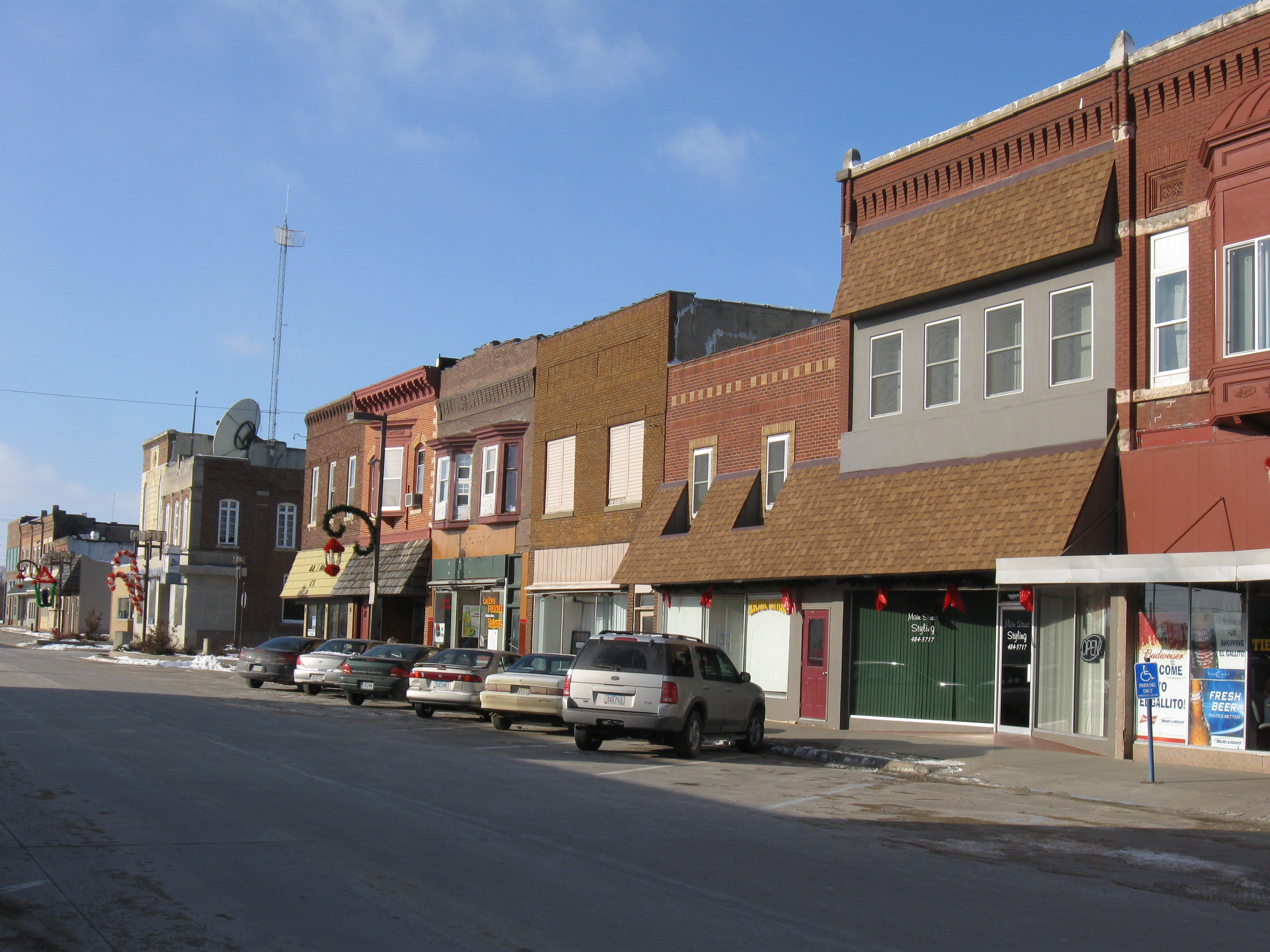
- Buildings in Downtown Tama

- Location of Tama, Iowa
- Coordinates: 41°57′53″N 92°34′27″W
- Country: United States
- State: Iowa
- County: Tama

Area
  - Total: 3.12 sq mi (8.07 km^{2})
  - Land: 2.97 sq mi (7.70 km^{2})
  - Water: 0.15 sq mi (0.38 km^{2})
- Elevation: 827 ft (252 m)

Population (2020)
  - Total: 3,130
  - Density: 1,053.5/sq mi (406.74/km^{2})
- Time zone: UTC-6 (Central (CST))
  - Summer (DST): UTC-5 (CDT)
- ZIP code: 52339
- Area code: 641
- FIPS code: 19-77115
- GNIS feature ID: 2396027
- Website: www.tamacityia.gov

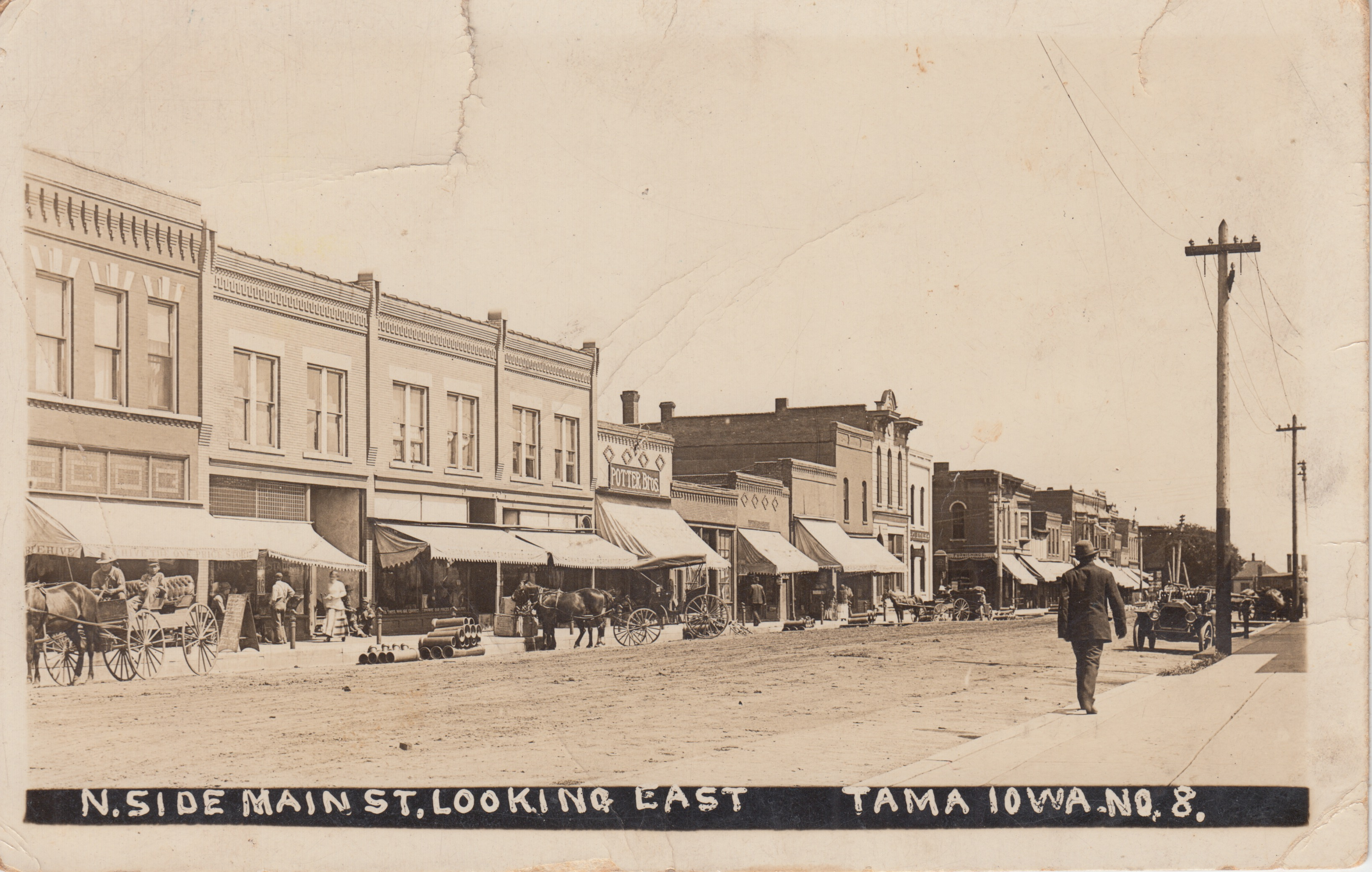
North Side Main Street in 1913

Tama is a city in Tama County, Iowa, United States. The population was 3,130 at the time of the 2020 census.

Tama is situated two miles south of Toledo, the county seat. The two towns are close enough to have nearly grown together over the years.

== History ==
Tama got its start in the year 1862, following construction of the Cedar Rapids and Missouri River Railroad through the territory.

Tama is located a few miles from the Meskwaki Settlement, Iowa's only significant Native American community. Tama was located on the historic Lincoln Highway and is home to an original Lincoln Highway bridge, listed on the National Register of Historic Places. Tama is named for Taimah, the 19th century Meskwaki leader.

== Geography ==
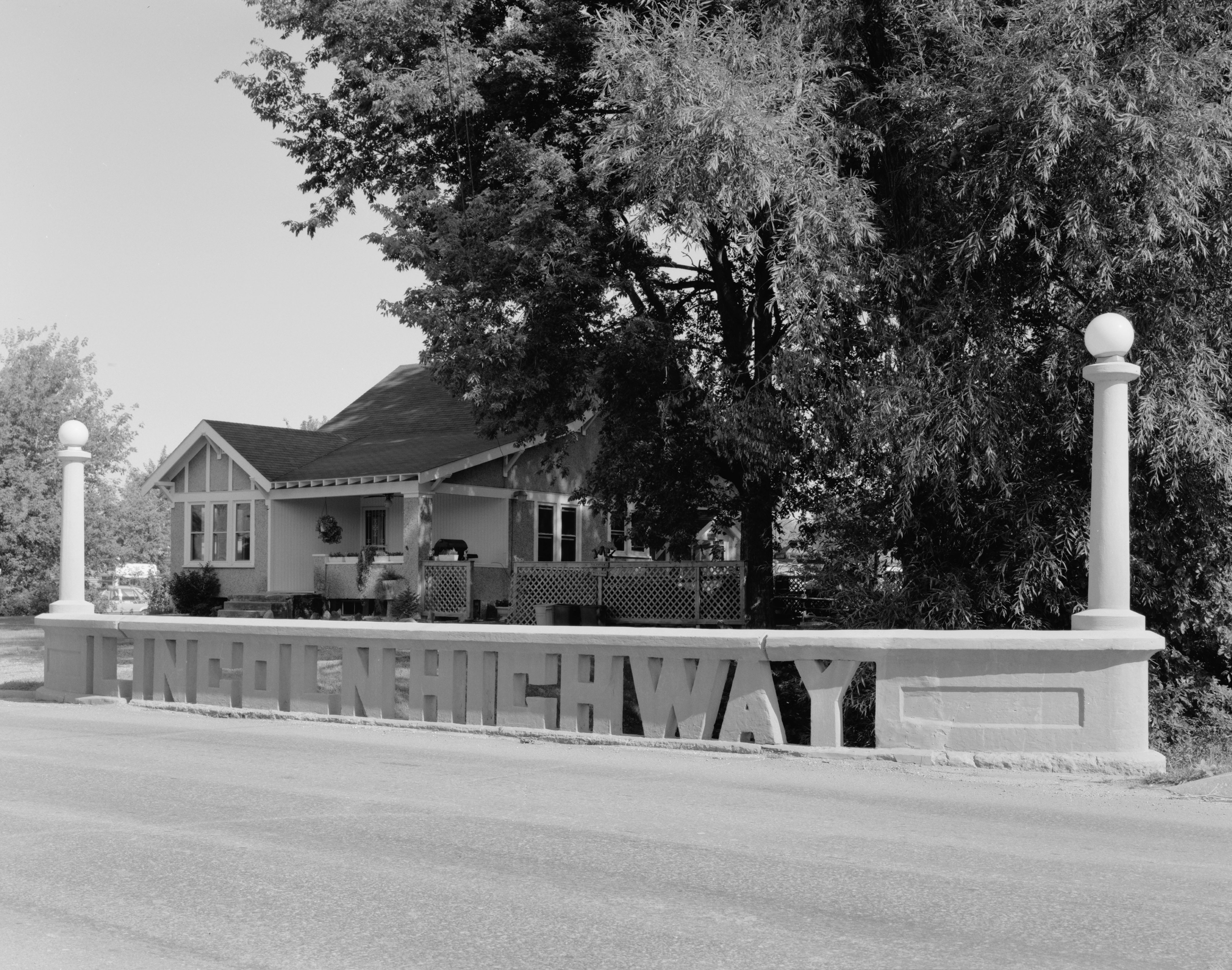
The Lincoln Highway bridge.

According to the United States Census Bureau, the city has a total area of 3.41 square miles (8.8 km^{2}), of which 3.26 square miles (8.4 km^{2}) is land and 0.15 square miles (0.39 km^{2}) is water.

== Demographics ==
Historical populations
Year	Pop.	±%
1870	1,161	—
1880	1,289	+11.0%
1890	1,741	+35.1%
1900	2,649	+52.2%
1910	2,290	−13.6%
1920	2,601	+13.6%
1930	2,626	+1.0%
1940	2,832	+7.8%
1950	2,930	+3.5%
1960	2,925	−0.2%
1970	3,000	+2.6%
1980	2,968	−1.1%
1990	2,697	−9.1%
2000	2,731	+1.3%
2010	2,877	+5.3%
2020	3,130	+8.8%
Source:"U.S. Census website". United States Census Bureau. and Iowa Data Center; Source: U.S. Decennial Census

=== 2020 census ===
As of the 2020 census, Tama had a population of 3,130, with 1,118 households and 716 families residing in the city. The population density was 1,053.4 inhabitants per square mile (406.7/km^{2}). There were 1,243 housing units at an average density of 418.3 per square mile (161.5/km^{2}).

The median age was 35.2 years. 27.2% of residents were under the age of 18 and 15.7% were 65 years of age or older. For every 100 females there were 94.9 males, and for every 100 females age 18 and over there were 92.7 males age 18 and over. 95.2% of residents lived in urban areas, while 4.8% lived in rural areas.

Of all households, 35.2% had children under the age of 18 living in them. Of all households, 43.2% were married-couple households, 9.4% were cohabiting-couple households, 19.6% were households with a male householder and no spouse or partner present, and 27.8% were households with a female householder and no spouse or partner present. About 36.0% of households were non-families, 29.9% were made up of individuals, and 13.9% had someone living alone who was 65 years of age or older.

Of all housing units, 10.1% were vacant. The homeowner vacancy rate was 0.8% and the rental vacancy rate was 11.8%.

Racial composition as of the 2020 census
Race	Number	Percent
White	2,014	64.3%
Black or African American	48	1.5%
American Indian and Alaska Native	211	6.7%
Asian	16	0.5%
Native Hawaiian and Other Pacific Islander	0	0.0%
Some other race	437	14.0%
Two or more races	404	12.9%
Hispanic or Latino (of any race)	981	31.3%

=== 2010 census ===
As of the census of 2010, there were 2,877 people, 1,092 households, and 708 families living in the city. The population density was 882.5 inhabitants per square mile (340.7/km^{2}). There were 1,234 housing units at an average density of 378.5 per square mile (146.1/km^{2}). The racial makeup of the city was 78.4% White, 0.5% African American, 5.8% Native American, 0.3% Asian, 9.7% from other races, and 5.2% from two or more races. Hispanic or Latino of any race were 23.6% of the population.

There were 1,092 households, of which 36.5% had children under the age of 18 living with them, 47.9% were married couples living together, 11.6% had a female householder with no husband present, 5.3% had a male householder with no wife present, and 35.2% were non-families. 29.0% of all households were made up of individuals, and 15.2% had someone living alone who was 65 years of age or older. The average household size was 2.58 and the average family size was 3.21.

The median age in the city was 35.6 years. 28.7% of residents were under the age of 18; 8.6% were between the ages of 18 and 24; 24.5% were from 25 to 44; 22.3% were from 45 to 64; and 16.1% were 65 years of age or older. The gender makeup of the city was 48.7% male and 51.3% female.

=== 2000 census ===
As of the census of 2000, there were 2,731 people, 1,065 households, and 723 families living in the city. The population density was 905.1 inhabitants per square mile (349.5/km^{2}). There were 1,173 housing units at an average density of 388.7 per square mile (150.1/km^{2}). The racial makeup of the city was 87.04% White, 0.40% African American, 4.80% Native American, 0.40% Asian, 5.24% from other races, and 2.12% from two or more races. Hispanic or Latino of any race were 9.63% of the population.

There were 1,065 households, out of which 33.2% had children under the age of 18 living with them, 51.6% were married couples living together, 12.5% had a female householder with no husband present, and 32.1% were non-families. 28.1% of all households were made up of individuals, and 16.5% had someone living alone who was 65 years of age or older. The average household size was 2.51 and the average family size was 3.08.

Age spread: 27.4% under the age of 18, 8.1% from 18 to 24, 25.0% from 25 to 44, 20.7% from 45 to 64, and 18.8% who were 65 years of age or older. The median age was 37 years. For every 100 females, there were 91.2 males. For every 100 females age 18 and over, there were 82.4 males.

The median income for a household in the city was $35,531, and the median income for a family was $43,750. Males had a median income of $33,672 versus $22,237 for females. The per capita income for the city was $16,676. About 8.8% of families and 12.3% of the population were below the poverty line, including 17.3% of those under age 18 and 16.9% of those age 65 or over.

== Healthcare ==
Tama-Toledo area residents have access to healthcare services at MercyCare Tama or Unity Point Toledo Clinic. When hospitalization is required the closest and most convenient hospital for residents is Grinnell Regional Medical Center or UnityPoint Health - Marshalltown Hospital.

== Education ==
It is within the South Tama County Community School District.

== Politics ==
Tama is the headquarters of the Sac and Fox Tribe of the Mississippi in Iowa.

== Notable people ==
- Vivia Belle Appleton, physician, medical missionary
- Paul Bradley, retired MMA fighter
- Lance Horbach, member of the Iowa House of Representatives
- Andre Roberts, retired MMA fighter
- Bob Soth, long-distance runner who competed in the 1960 Summer Olympics
- Ska-ba-quay Tesson, Meskwaki artist
- Lewis Haines Wentz, businessman

== See also ==
- Impact of the COVID-19 pandemic on the meat industry in the United States
