= Sac and Fox Tribe of the Mississippi in Iowa =

Native American tribe commonly called Meskwaki

Meshkwahkîhaki
- Tribal flag

Total population
- 1,300

Regions with significant populations
- United States ( Iowa)

Languages
- English, Sauk, Meskwaki

Religion
- Traditional tribal religion, Christianity

Related ethnic groups
- Sauk people, Meskwaki, Kickapoo people

Location of the Sac and Fox Tribe in Iowa

The Sac and Fox Tribe of the Mississippi in Iowa is one of three federally recognized Native American tribes of Sac and Meskwaki (Fox) peoples in the United States. The Fox call themselves Meskwaki and because they are the dominant people in this tribe, it is also simply called the Meskwaki Nation (Meskwaki: Meshkwahkîhaki, meaning: "People of the red earth"). The Sauk people call themselves Êshkwîha (literally: "Fox people") or Yochikwîka, both with the meaning "Northern Sauk". They are Algonquian peoples, historically developed in the Eastern Woodland culture. The settlement, called Meskwakiinaki, is located in Tama County, Iowa.

== Government and economic development ==
The Sac and Fox Tribe of the Mississippi in Iowa is headquartered in Tama, Iowa. They are governed by a seven-person council. They oversee more than 7,000 acres (28 km^{2}) of land, known as Meskwakiinaki, which the Meskwaki bought mostly in the 19th century. In 2005, they established a tribal court system and tribal law enforcement in 2006.

The tribe publishes the Meskwaki Nation Times, a bi-monthly newspaper for enrolled tribal members. It is a member of the Native American Journalists Association.

The tribe operates the Meskwaki Trading Post, Meskwaki Bingo Casino, Prime Cut Steakhouse, Full House Cafe, Food Arcade and the Jackpot Buffet, and the Meskwaki Bingo Casino Hotel, with 400 guest rooms, all located outside Tama, Iowa.

The current tribal council members are:

- Chairman: Dawson Davenport
- Vice-Chairman: Drayton Roberts
- Treasurer: Delonda Pushetonequa
- Council Member: Clinton Bear
- Council Member: Jarvis Bear
- Council Member: Eric R. Kapayou
- Council Member: Zane Oldbear

== History ==
The tribe organized this form of government in 1934 under the federal Indian Reorganization Act.

== See also ==
The Sac and Fox Tribe of the Mississippi in Iowa holds the smallest amount of land of the three federally recognized tribes of the Sac and Fox peoples. The other two are:

- The Sac and Fox Nation (or Sakiwaki (variants: Thâkîwa; Othâkîwa)) in Oklahoma (see Oklahoma Tribal Statistical Area)
- Sac and Fox Nation of Missouri in Kansas and Nebraska (or Nemahahaki (variants: Nîmahâha; Nemaha [County] Sauk)) in Richardson County, Nebraska and Brown County, Kansas
