= Douglas Township, Iowa =

Douglas Township, Iowa can refer to one of the following townships in Iowa:

- Douglas Township, Adams County
- Douglas Township, Appanoose County
- Douglas Township, Audubon County
- Douglas Township, Boone County
- Douglas Township, Bremer County
- Douglas Township, Clay County
- Douglas Township, Harrison County
- Douglas Township, Ida County
- Douglas Township, Madison County
- Douglas Township, Mitchell County
- Douglas Township, Montgomery County
- Douglas Township, Page County
- Douglas Township, Polk County
- Douglas Township, Sac County
- Douglas Township, Shelby County
- Douglas Township, Union County
- Douglas Township, Webster County

== See also ==
- Douglas Township (disambiguation)
