= Lincoln Township, Shelby County, Iowa =

Coordinates: 41.6483°N 95.3827°W

Lincoln Township
- Township
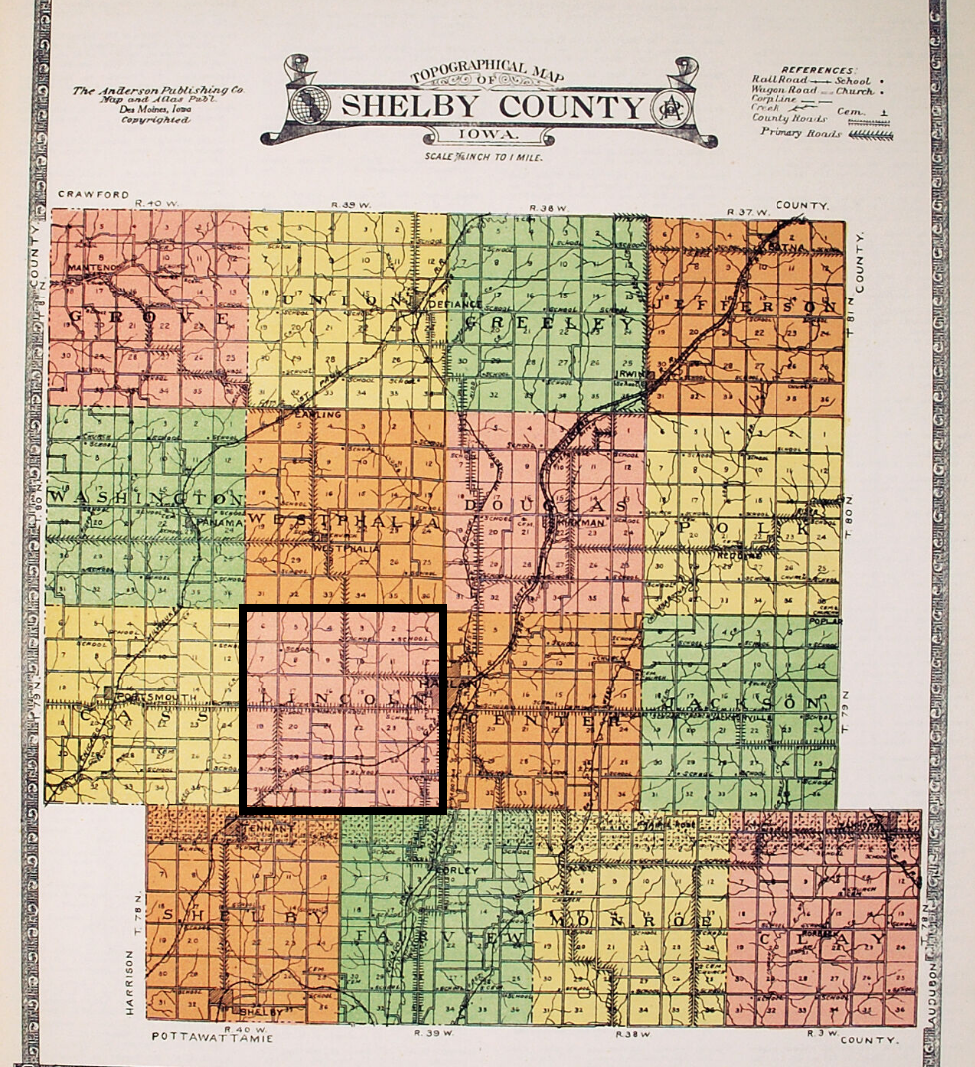
- Lincoln Township highlighted on Shelby County map
- Country: United States
- State: Iowa
- County: Shelby

Population (2020)
  - Total: 406
- Time zone: UTC-6 (CST)
  - Summer (DST): UTC-5 (CDT)

Lincoln Township is a township in Shelby County, Iowa. In the 2020 U.S. Census, there were 406 residents of the township, with 137 occupied dwellings, and 3 unoccupied dwellings. The total area is 33.6 square miles.

This township was constituted on April 3, 1871, when it had a population of 129. It is bounded to the north by Westphalia Township, on the east by Center, on the south by Shelby and Fairview, and on the west by Cass. The first white settler in what became the township was likely Jacob Bosley, who arrived in 1865, followed most likely by T.A. Long in 1868.

The township's population declined since the 1930 census (population 640) to 371 in the 2020 census, before rising slightly to 406 in the 2020 census.

Historical population
Census	Pop.	Note	%±
1890	935		—
1900	725		−22.5%
1910	614		−15.3%
1920	588		−4.2%
1930	640		8.8%
1940	633		−1.1%
1950	553		−12.6%
1960	557		0.7%
1970	457		−18.0%
1980	453		−0.9%
1990	389		−14.1%
2000	376		−3.3%
2010	371		−1.3%
2020	406		9.4%
