= West Nishnabotna River =

Stream in Iowa, U.S.

Coordinates: 40°39′08″N 95°37′17″W

The West Nishnabotna River is a stream in the U.S. state of Iowa. It is a tributary of Nishnabotna River and is channelized for much of its course. The river is 121.3 miles long and is considered a major water source by the Iowa DNR. The West Nishnabotna is the larger of the two main tributaries of the Nishnabotna River having a 1,582 square miles (4,100 km^{2}) drainage basin.

== Hydrology ==
The stream is monitored at two places by NOAA: Randolph, and Hancock.

=== Course ===
The East Nishnabotna rises in western Carroll County and flows southerly past Manning and turns southwest as it briefly flows through Crawford County and into Shelby County. Immediately, it passes to the northwest of Botna, then continues another 6 miles to Irwin, then meanders southwest and passes Kirkman to the east. The river continues southerly and joins with the West Fork Nishanbotna River at Harlan, which is also the largest town on its course.

The river continues south-southwest and enters Pottawattamie County and passes Avoca, Hancock, Oakland, and Carson within the county. Entering Mills County the major tributaries join the West Nishnabotna: Farm Creek, Indian Creek, Silver Creek. The stream progresses southwesterly past Henderson and Hastings as it enters Fremont County. The final stretch of the river is mostly due south and after passing Randolph it continued to the southern part of the county and merged with the East Nishnabotna River southwest of Riverton.

== Crossings ==
Several major highways cross the West Nishnabotna River. I-80 is the lone Interstate Highway that crosses the stream. Three U.S. Highways crosses the West Nishnabotna: US 6, US 34, and US 59; and four Iowa state highways cross it: Iowa 2, Iowa 44, Iowa 92, and Iowa 141.

== Tributaries ==
=== Fremont County ===
- Spring Branch
- Canyon Creek
- Walnut Creek - 66 miles long
  - Hunter Branch
  - Crabapple Creek
  - Little Walnut Creek
- Honey Creek
- Camp Creek
- Deer Creek
- Kilpatrick Ditch

=== Mills County ===
- Spring Valley Creek
- Mule Creek
- Silver Creek - 65 miles long
  - Little Creek
  - Osborne Creek
  - Little Silver Creek
    - Middle Silver Creek
- Indian Creek - 33 miles long
  - Douglas Creek
  - Little Indian Creek
- Mud Creek - 19 miles long
- Farm Creek - 18 miles long
  - Graybill Creek
  - Jordan Creek
    - Spring Creek

=== Pottawattamie County ===
- Minimum Creek
- Slocum Creek
- East Branch West Nishnabotna River - 41 miles long
  - Ballard Creek
    - Bedell Creek
  - Dutch Creek
  - Elm Creek
  - Long Branch
  - Lone WIllow Creek

=== Shelby County ===
- West Branch West Nishnabotna River - 37 miles long
  - Kidds Creek
  - Willow Creek
  - Malony Branch
- Elk Creek

== See also ==
- List of rivers of Iowa
- List of tributaries of the Missouri River
