= Red Line, Iowa =

- Unincorporated community
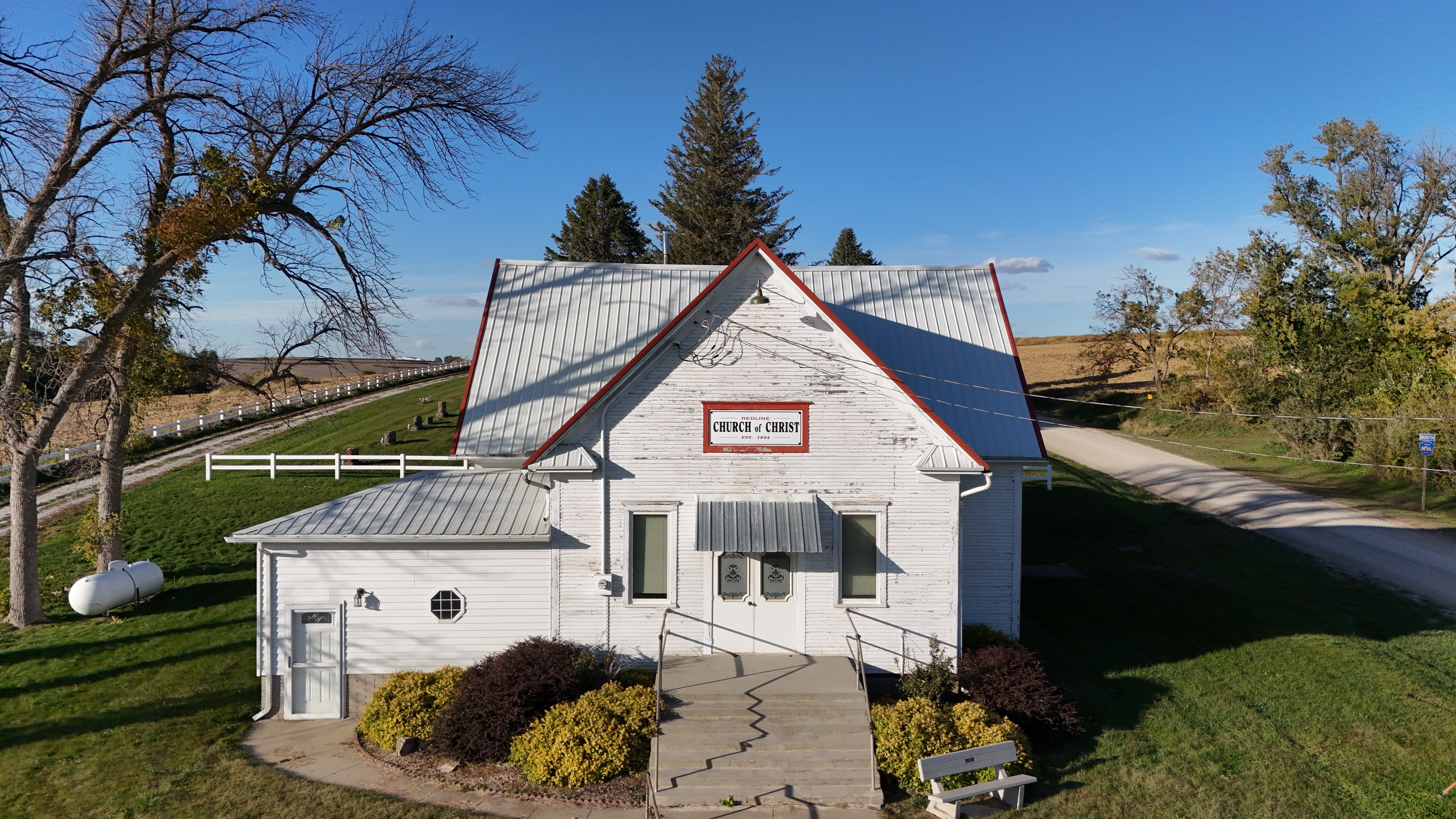
- Red Line Church of Christ

- Location within Iowa
- Coordinates: 41°43′02″N 95°09′04″W
- Country: United States
- State: Iowa
- County: Shelby
- Elevation: 1,266 ft (386 m)
- Time zone: UTC-6 (Central (CST))
  - Summer (DST): UTC-5 (CDT)
- Area code: 712
- GNIS feature ID: 460552

Red Line is an unincorporated community in Polk Township, Shelby County, Iowa, United States.

== Geography ==
Red Line is located along County Highway M56 10 miles (16 km) east-northeast of Harlan.

== History ==
Red Line's population was 10 in 1940.

== See also ==
- Manteno, Iowa
