= IKM–Manning Community School District =

Public school district in Manning, Iowa, United States

Coordinates: 41.903555°N 95.056457°W

Location
- Manning, Iowa Audubon, Carroll, Crawford, and Shelby counties United States
- Coordinates: 41.903555, -95.056457

District information
- Type: Local school district
- Grades: K–12
- Established: 2011
- Superintendent: Trevor Miller
- Schools: 3
- Budget: $11,566,000 (2020–21)
- NCES District ID: 1931680

Students and staff
- Students: 710 (2022-23)
- Teachers: 51.87 FTE
- Staff: 69.42 FTE
- Student–teacher ratio: 13.69
- Athletic conference: Western Iowa Conference
- District mascot: Wolves
- Colors: Green and black

Other information
- Website: www.ikm-manning.k12.ia.us

IKM–Manning Community School District is a rural public school district headquartered at IKM–Manning Middle and High School in Manning, Iowa. In addition to Manning, the district name also refers to the municipalities of Irwin, Kirkman, and Manilla.

The district is located in sections of Audubon, Carroll, Crawford, and Shelby counties. It serves all of the municipalities of Manning, Irwin, Kirkman, Manilla, and Aspinwall. A small section of Templeton lies within the district boundaries.

== History ==
=== Manning Community School District ===
Proposals to create the Manning Community School District were unveiled in 1957. The election to create the district was held on April 29, 1959. 977 persons voted in ten voting districts, with 916 of them voting in favor and the others voting against. The proposal included moving portions of the Manilla Community School District into the Manning district. 34 residents in that area voted in favor of moving into Manning, while the other 14 voted against.

The Manning district began operations on July 1, 1959. It comprised land in the counties of Audubon, Carroll, Crawford, and Shelby, with 105 sections of land in total. About 6.5 sections were taken from the Manilla district.

Manilla CSD sued to stop or reverse creation of the district, citing an Iowa law on the eligibility of voters to vote on the creation of the district. The Carroll County District court judge William C. Hanson decided that the Manning district should remain, and in 1960 the Iowa Supreme Court ruled in the same way as Hanson.

Circa 1968 the board of Carroll County decided that the Manning Community School District would absorb the Eden Township School District and the Templeton Independent School District. The two districts were to file appeals to the district court of that county. In 1974, the three school districts and the Carroll Community School District decided that the Eden and Templeton districts would be divided between the Carroll and Manning districts; Carroll got about 89% and 75%, respectively, of the land of the Templeton and Eden districts, with the Manning district taking the remainders.

The district had 563 students in the 1995–1996 school year. In the 2004–2005 school year it had 511 students over 111.8 square miles (290 km^{2}) of area.

In fall 2008 the Manning district and the IKM Community School District began whole grade-sharing, in which one district sent its students to another district's school for the whole day. This arrangement meant that the two districts consolidated their students into each other's schools.

=== Merge ===
A vote to merge the districts, held on Tuesday April 6, 2010, was in favor of consolidation: the vote tally at the Manning poll station was 477–20; the tallies in Irwin and Manilla, respectively, were 206-26 and 190–20. During the consolidation process, the IKM and Manning school boards continued to operate while a temporary joint school board was also set up.

The IKM–Manning Community School District was established on July 1, 2011, from the merger of the Manning Community School District and the IKM Community School District.

The superintendent of the district, Thomas Ward, stated that rural areas lost population as increasingly urban areas of the state had the major employment available.

The district was previously headquartered in Manilla.

=== Modern development ===
Trevor Miller has served as superintendent since 2017, and the district entered a sharing agreement with Exira–EHK to split his time 50/50. In 2020, the districts modified the agreement for the 2020–21 to split his time 80/20 with 4 days per week at Exira–EHK and a single day per week at IKM–Manning.

In 2020 there was a vote for a school bond of more than $19 million, but this was voted down. The same result happened in 2021.

By 2023 there were plans to add a multipurpose building that also would function as another gymnasium.

== Schools ==
The district operates two schools: IKM–Manning Elementary School in Irwin, and IKM–Manning Middle and High School.

The Manning campus, which once had both elementary and high school grades, at one time had about 550 students.

The district previously operated a middle school in Manilla, with a main building, an addition, and gymnasium from 1914, 1959, and December 1935, respectively. The addition held elementary school classes. Jeff Morrison of the Des Moines Register wrote that "If you had to select one place to represent the last century of rural Iowa education, the school complex in Manilla would be a good option." The Manilla school closed in 2014; at the time the district continued to have its headquarters there. The district also continued to use the gymnasium for junior high school athletic games.

=== IKM–Manning High School ===
==== Athletics ====
The Wolves compete in the Western Iowa Conference in the following sports:

- Cross country
- Volleyball
- Football
- Basketball
  - Girls' 2009 class 2A state champions
- Wrestling
- Track and field
- Golf
- Soccer
- Baseball
- Softball

== See also ==
- List of school districts in Iowa
- List of high schools in Iowa
