= Douglass Township, Pennsylvania =

Douglass Township may refer to:

- Douglass Township, Berks County, Pennsylvania
- Douglass Township, Montgomery County, Pennsylvania

== See also ==
- Douglassville, Pennsylvania, a census-designated place in Berks County
- Douglass Township (disambiguation)
- Douglas Township (disambiguation)
