= Manteno, Iowa =

- Unincorporated community
- Location within Iowa
- Coordinates: 41°49′57″N 95°32′14″W
- Country: United States
- State: Iowa
- County: Shelby
- Elevation: 1,168 ft (356 m)
- Time zone: UTC-6 (Central (CST))
  - Summer (DST): UTC-5 (CDT)
- Area code: 712
- GNIS feature ID: 464640

Manteno is an unincorporated community in Grove Township, Shelby County, Iowa, United States.

== Geography ==
Manteno is located along County Highway F16, 3.7 miles (6.0 km) east-southeast of Dunlap.

== See also ==
- Botna, Iowa
