= Audubon Manning Veterinary Clinic =

The Audubon Manning Veterinary Clinic (AMVC) is one of the largest pork producers in the United States. AMVC operates in ten states, and it is headquartered in Audubon, Iowa.

The Audubon Veterinary Clinic was a small practice in southwest central Iowa. It served the needs of both large and small animal owners. In 1990, the Audubon Manning Veterinary Clinic (AMVC) was formed when the Audubon Veterinary clinic purchased a veterinary clinic in nearby Manning, Iowa.

Audubon, Iowa, was known for its beef industry (the town is home to Albert the Bull, which pays homage to this heritage), but the number of cattle farmers in the area began to decrease in the 1990s. Concomitantly, the swine industry was rapidly changing in the region. Farmers began to move away from managing their own sows, and sow management was being industrialized by larger, more centralized corporations. The veterinarians at AMVC recognized the need for swine management services in the region, and they pivoted their business to fulfill this need.

The number of veterinarians has increased from four in the 1990s to over twenty in 2021. It has industrial swine production presence in ten states. AMVC provides veterinary services, livestock nutritional counseling, and swine management services. AMVC continues to grow, as it added 6,800 sows to its operations in 2020.
