= IKM Community School District =

Defunct school district in Iowa, United States

IKM Community School District was a school district headquartered in Manilla. The district name referred to the municipalities of Irwin, Kirkman, and Manilla. In addition to the aforementioned cities, it also served Aspinwall.

== History ==
It was formed on July 1, 1992, by the merger of the Irwin and Manilla school districts.

In fall 2008 the IKM district and the Manning Community School District began whole grade-sharing, in which one district sent its students to another district's school for the whole day. This arrangement meant that the two districts consolidated their students into each other's schools.

On July 1, 2011, it merged with the Manning district to form the IKM–Manning Community School District. The merger vote, held on Tuesday April 6, 2010, was in favor of consolidation: the vote tallies were 206–26 at the Irwin polling station and 190–20 at the Manilla polling station, while in Manning the tally was 477–20.

During the consolidation process, the IKM and Manning school boards continued to operate while a temporary joint school board was also set up.

== Schools ==
The district operated an elementary school in Irwin, and a high school in Manilla.

Irwin Consolidated School was formerly in operation.
