= Lincoln Township, Audubon County, Iowa =

Township in Iowa, US

Lincoln Township, Audubon County
- Township
- Coordinates: 41°49′15″N 095°01′58″W
- Country: United States
- State: Iowa
- County: Audubon

Area
  - Total: 35.9 sq mi (93.0 km^{2})
  - Land: 35.9 sq mi (93.0 km^{2})
  - Water: 0 sq mi (0 km^{2})
- Elevation: 1,342 ft (409 m)

Population (2010)
  - Total: 285
  - Density: 8.0/sq mi (3.1/km^{2})
- FIPS code: 19-92523
- GNIS feature ID: 0468240

Lincoln Township is one of twelve townships in Audubon County, Iowa, United States. As of the 2010 census, its population was 285.

== History ==
Lincoln Township was organized in 1876.

== Geography ==
Lincoln Township covers an area of 35.9 square miles (93.0 km^{2}) and contains one incorporated settlement, Gray. According to the USGS, it contains two cemeteries: Gray and Lincoln Township.
