= Audubon Township =

Audubon Township may refer to the following townships in the United States:

- Audubon Township, Montgomery County, Illinois
- Audubon Township, Audubon County, Iowa
- Audubon Township, Becker County, Minnesota
