= Peter Steenhusen =

American politician

Member of the Iowa House of Representatives from the 33rd district
- In office January 14, 1957 – January 14, 1963
- Preceded by: Jay Colburn
- Succeeded by: Alfred Nielsen

Personal details
- Born: December 31, 1903 Irwin, Iowa
- Died: November 6, 1975 (aged 71)
- Party: Democratic

Peter Steenhusen (December 31, 1903 – November 6, 1975) was an American politician who served in the Iowa House of Representatives from the 33rd district from 1957 to 1963.
