= Greeley Township =

Greeley Township may refer to the following townships in the United States:

- Greeley Township, Audubon County, Iowa
- Greeley Township, Saline County, Kansas
- Greeley Township, Sedgwick County, Kansas
