= Walnut Creek (West Nishnabotna River tributary) =

Stream in Iowa, U.S.

Coordinates: 40°47′12″N 95°35′24″W

Walnut Creek is a stream in Fremont, Mills, Montgomery, Page, Pottawattamie, and Shelby counties in Iowa. It is a tributary of the West Nishnabotna River.

Walnut Creek is named after the groves of black walnut surrounding it.

There are three named tributaries of this stream: Hunter Branch, Crabapple Creek, and Little Walnut Creek.

== See also ==
- Tributaries of the West Nishnabotna River
- List of rivers of Iowa
