= Melville Township =

Melville Township may refer to the following townships in the United States:

- Melville Township, Audubon County, Iowa
- Melville Township, Renville County, Minnesota
