= Hamlin Township, Audubon County, Iowa =

Township in Iowa, US

Hamlin Township, Audubon County
- Township
- Coordinates: 41°38′34″N 094°55′02″W
- Country: United States
- State: Iowa
- County: Audubon

Area
  - Total: 35.81 sq mi (92.76 km^{2})
  - Land: 35.80 sq mi (92.71 km^{2})
  - Water: 0.019 sq mi (0.05 km^{2})
- Elevation: 1,335 ft (407 m)

Population (2010)
  - Total: 252
  - Density: 7.0/sq mi (2.7/km^{2})
- FIPS code: 19-91815
- GNIS feature ID: 0467994

Hamlin Township is one of twelve townships in Audubon County, Iowa, United States. As of the 2010 census, its population was 252.

== History ==
Hamlin Township was organized in 1873. It was named for Nathaniel Hamlin, a pioneer settler.

== Geography ==
Hamlin Township covers an area of 35.82 square miles (92.8 km^{2}) and contains no incorporated settlements. According to the USGS, it contains three cemeteries: Adventist, Danish and Seventh Day Adventist.
