= Aspinwall, Iowa =

- City
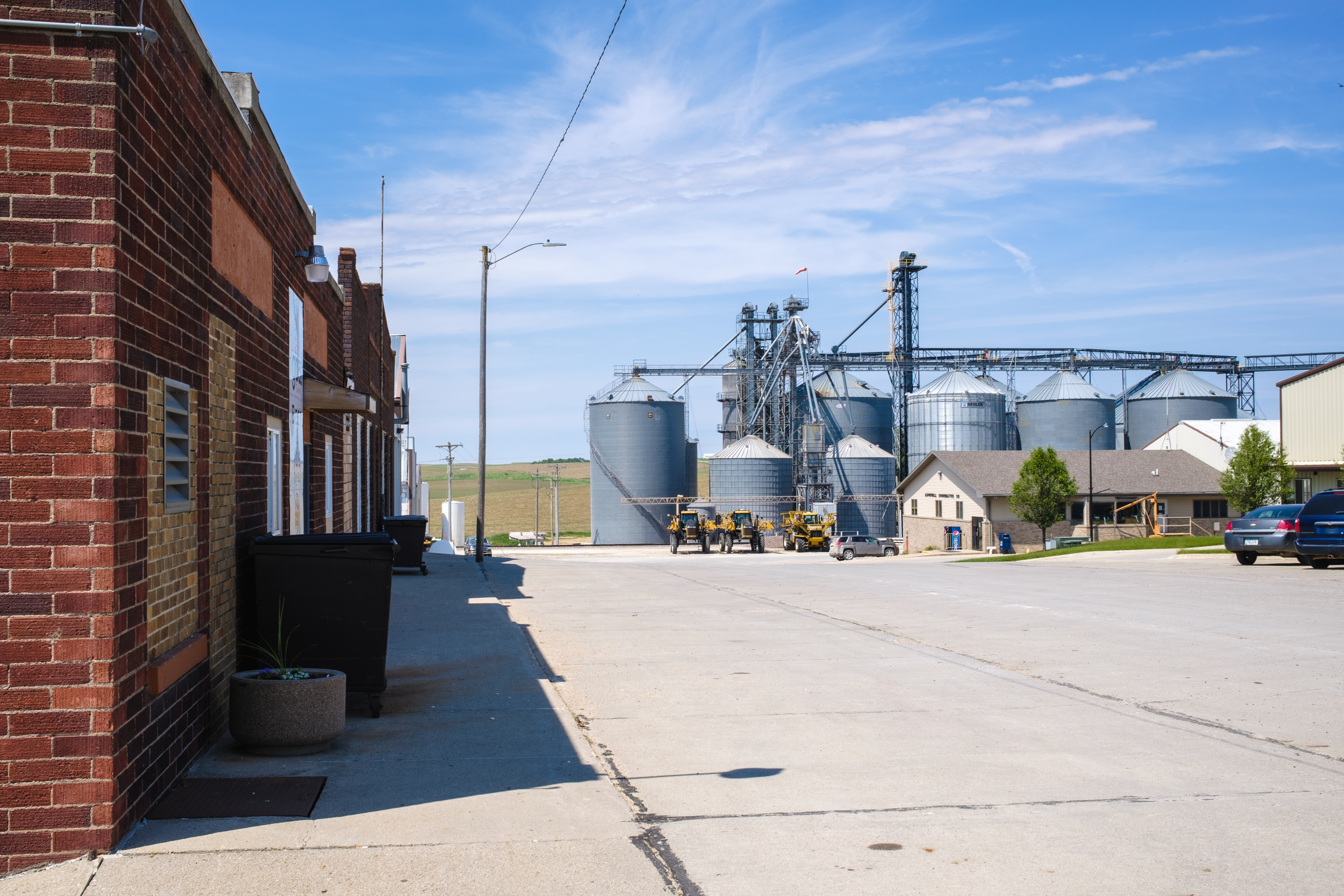
- A view down Main Street toward the grain elevators.

- Location of Aspinwall, Iowa

- Location within Iowa Location within the United States Location within North America
- Coordinates: 41°54′38″N 95°08′06″W
- Country: USA
- State: Iowa
- County: Crawford

Area
  - Total: 0.18 sq mi (0.46 km^{2})
  - Land: 0.18 sq mi (0.46 km^{2})
  - Water: 0 sq mi (0.00 km^{2})
- Elevation: 1,408 ft (429 m)

Population (2020)
  - Total: 33
  - Density: 187/sq mi (72.3/km^{2})
- Time zone: UTC-6 (Central (CST))
  - Summer (DST): UTC-5 (CDT)
- ZIP code: 51432
- Area code: 712
- FIPS code: 19-03340
- GNIS feature ID: 2394005

Aspinwall is a city in Crawford County, Iowa, United States. The population was 33 at the 2020 census.

== Geography ==
According to the United States Census Bureau, the city has a total area of 0.18 square miles (0.47 km^{2}), all land.

== Demographics ==
Historical populations
| Year | Pop. | ±% |
|---|---|---|
| 1920 | 125 | — |
| 1930 | 107 | −14.4% |
| 1940 | 88 | −17.8% |
| 1950 | 107 | +21.6% |
| 1960 | 95 | −11.2% |
| 1970 | 81 | −14.7% |
| 1980 | 65 | −19.8% |
| 1990 | 52 | −20.0% |
| 2000 | 58 | +11.5% |
| 2010 | 40 | −31.0% |
| 2020 | 33 | −17.5% |
Source:"U.S. Census website". United States Census Bureau. and Iowa Data Center; Source: U.S. Decennial Census

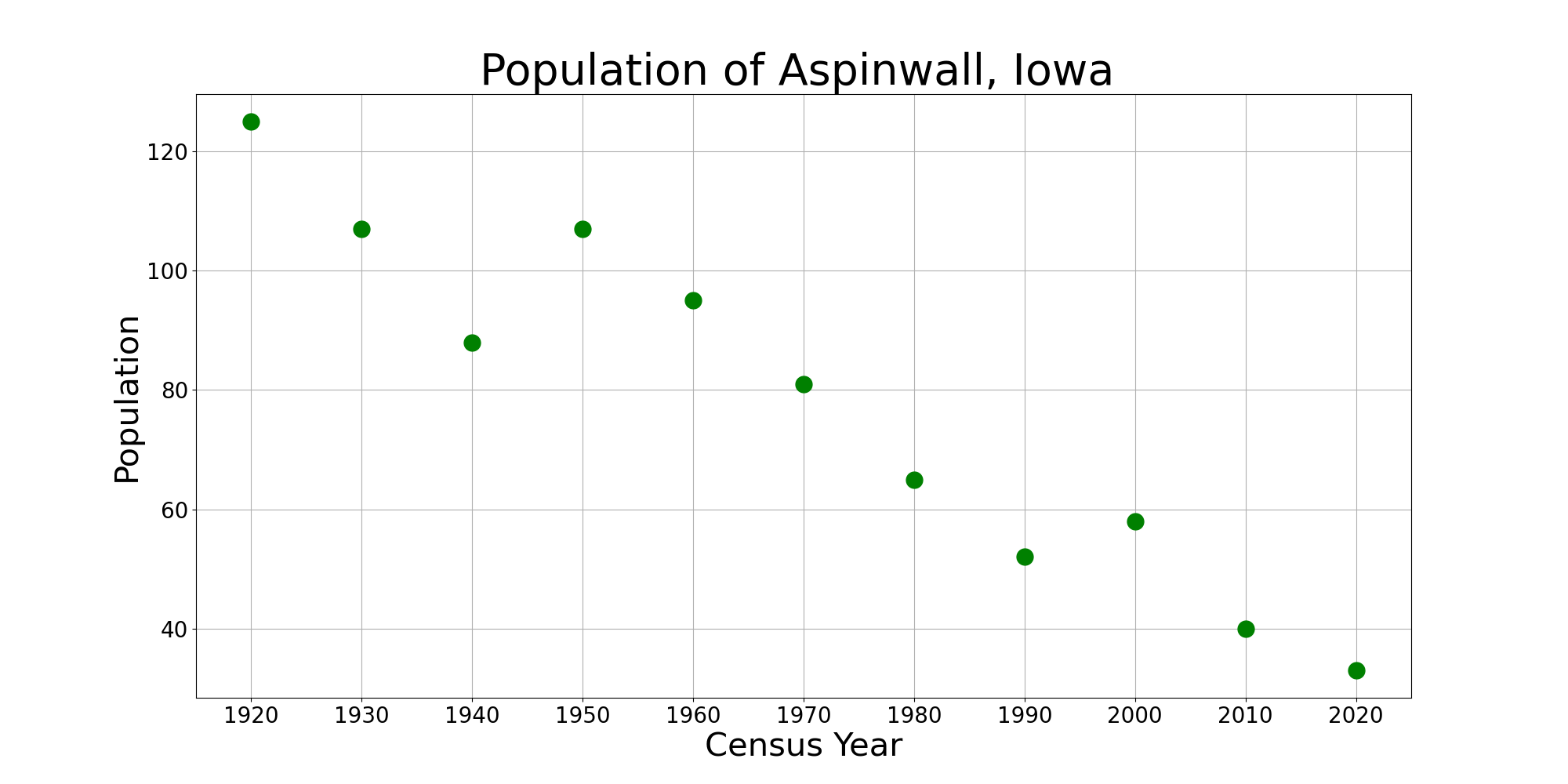
The population of Aspinwall, Iowa from US census data

=== 2020 census ===
As of the census of 2020, there were 33 people, 15 households, and 12 families residing in the city. The population density was 187.3 inhabitants per square mile (72.3/km^{2}). There were 21 housing units at an average density of 119.2 per square mile (46.0/km^{2}). The racial makeup of the city was 100.0% White, 0.0% Black or African American, 0.0% Native American, 0.0% Asian, 0.0% Pacific Islander, 0.0% from other races and 0.0% from two or more races. Hispanic or Latino persons of any race comprised 0.0% of the population.

Of the 15 households, 26.7% of which had children under the age of 18 living with them, 53.3% were married couples living together, 13.3% were cohabitating couples, 26.7% had a female householder with no spouse or partner present and 6.7% had a male householder with no spouse or partner present. 20.0% of all households were non-families. 20.0% of all households were made up of individuals, 13.3% had someone living alone who was 65 years old or older.

The median age in the city was 60.5 years. 12.1% of the residents were under the age of 20; 6.1% were between the ages of 20 and 24; 12.1% were from 25 and 44; 33.3% were from 45 and 64; and 36.4% were 65 years of age or older. The gender makeup of the city was 42.4% male and 57.6% female.

=== 2010 census ===
As of the census of 2010, there were 40 people, 22 households, and 12 families living in the city. The population density was 222.2 inhabitants per square mile (85.8/km^{2}). There were 27 housing units at an average density of 150.0 per square mile (57.9/km^{2}). The racial makeup of the city was 100.0% White.

There were 22 households, of which 13.6% had children under the age of 18 living with them, 50.0% were married couples living together, 4.5% had a male householder with no wife present, and 45.5% were non-families. 45.5% of all households were made up of individuals, and 9.1% had someone living alone who was 65 years of age or older. The average household size was 1.82 and the average family size was 2.50.

The median age in the city was 55.5 years. 12.5% of residents were under the age of 18; 2.5% were between the ages of 18 and 24; 15% were from 25 to 44; 52.5% were from 45 to 64; and 17.5% were 65 years of age or older. The gender makeup of the city was 47.5% male and 52.5% female.

=== 2000 census ===
As of the census of 2000, there were 58 people, 23 households, and 18 families living in the city. The population density was 584.9 inhabitants per square mile (225.8/km^{2}). There were 25 housing units at an average density of 252.1 per square mile (97.3/km^{2}). The racial makeup of the city was 100.00% White.

There were 23 households, out of which 30.4% had children under the age of 18 living with them, 65.2% were married couples living together, 4.3% had a female householder with no husband present, and 17.4% were non-families. 17.4% of all households were made up of individuals, and 4.3% had someone living alone who was 65 years of age or older. The average household size was 2.52 and the average family size was 2.79.

In the city, the population was spread out, with 22.4% under the age of 18, 8.6% from 18 to 24, 20.7% from 25 to 44, 31.0% from 45 to 64, and 17.2% who were 65 years of age or older. The median age was 44 years. For every 100 females, there were 114.8 males. For every 100 females age 18 and over, there were 114.3 males.

The median income for a household in the city was $26,786, and the median income for a family was $41,250. Males had a median income of $38,750 versus $24,375 for females. The per capita income for the city was $19,835. None of the population and none of the families were below the poverty line.

== Education ==
Aspinwall is served by the IKM–Manning Community School District.

It was previously in the IKM Community School District, which formed on July 1, 1992. That in turn, on July 1, 2011, merged into IKM–Manning.
