= Douglas Township =

Douglas Township may refer to:

== Illinois ==
- Douglas Township, Clark County, Illinois
- Douglas Township, Effingham County, Illinois
- Douglas Township, Iroquois County, Illinois

== Iowa ==
- Douglas Township, Adams County, Iowa
- Douglas Township, Appanoose County, Iowa
- Douglas Township, Audubon County, Iowa
- Douglas Township, Boone County, Iowa
- Douglas Township, Bremer County, Iowa
- Douglas Township, Clay County, Iowa
- Douglas Township, Harrison County, Iowa
- Douglas Township, Ida County, Iowa
- Douglas Township, Madison County, Iowa
- Douglas Township, Mitchell County, Iowa
- Douglas Township, Montgomery County, Iowa
- Douglas Township, Page County, Iowa
- Douglas Township, Polk County, Iowa
- Douglas Township, Sac County, Iowa
- Douglas Township, Shelby County, Iowa, in Shelby County, Iowa
- Douglas Township, Union County, Iowa, in Union County, Iowa
- Douglas Township, Webster County, Iowa

== Kansas ==
- Douglas Township, Jackson County, Kansas
- Douglas Township, Stafford County, Kansas, a township in Stafford County, Kansas

== Minnesota ==
- Douglas Township, Dakota County, Minnesota

== Nebraska ==
- Douglas Township, Saunders County, Nebraska

== North Dakota ==
- Douglas Township, McLean County, North Dakota, a township in North Dakota

== See also ==
- Douglass Township (disambiguation)
