= Viola Township, Audubon County, Iowa =

Township in Iowa, US

Viola Township, Audubon County
- Township
- Coordinates: 41°49′13″N 094°48′11″W
- Country: United States
- State: Iowa
- County: Audubon

Area
  - Total: 35.3 sq mi (91.5 km^{2})
  - Land: 35.3 sq mi (91.5 km^{2})
  - Water: 0 sq mi (0 km^{2})
- Elevation: 1,401 ft (427 m)

Population (2010)
  - Total: 166
  - Density: 4.7/sq mi (1.8/km^{2})
- FIPS code: 19-94362
- GNIS feature ID: 0468872

Viola Township is one of twelve townships in Audubon County, Iowa, United States. As of the 2010 census, its population was 166.

== History ==
Viola Township was organized in 1873.

== Geography ==
Viola Township covers an area of 35.3 square miles (91.5 km^{2}) and contains no incorporated settlements. According to the USGS, it contains one cemetery, Viola Center.
