= Oakfield Township, Audubon County, Iowa =

Township in Iowa, US

Oakfield Township, Audubon County
- Township
- Coordinates: 41°33′14″N 094°59′05″W
- Country: United States
- State: Iowa
- County: Audubon

Area
  - Total: 39.8 sq mi (103.2 km^{2})
  - Land: 39.8 sq mi (103.0 km^{2})
  - Water: 0.077 sq mi (0.2 km^{2})
- Elevation: 1,270 ft (387 m)

Population (2010)
  - Total: 314
  - Density: 7.8/sq mi (3/km^{2})
- FIPS code: 19-93153
- GNIS feature ID: 0468456

Oakfield Township is one of twelve townships in Audubon County, Iowa, United States. As of the 2010 census, its population was 314.

== History ==
Oakfield Township was organized in 1874. It is named after Oakfield, New York, the former home of an early settler.

== Geography ==
Oakfield Township covers an area of 39.8 square miles (103.2 km^{2}) and contains no incorporated settlements. According to the USGS, it contains three cemeteries: Oak Hill, Oakfield and Saint Johns.
