= Monroe Township, Shelby County, Iowa =

Town in Iowa, United States

Monroe Township
- Township
- Interactive map of Monroe Township
- Coordinates: 41°36′N 95°12′W
- Country: United States
- State: Iowa
- County: Shelby

Area
  - Total: 39.5 sq mi (102 km^{2})

Population (2010)
  - Total: 147
  - Density: 3.72/sq mi (1.44/km^{2})
- Time zone: UTC-6 (CST)
  - Summer (DST): UTC-5 (CDT)

Monroe Township is a township in Shelby County, Iowa. There are 140 people and 3.5 people per square mile in Monroe Township. The total area is 39.5 square miles.
