= Jackson Township, Shelby County, Iowa =

Township in Shelby County, Iowa, U.S.

Coordinates: 41.6651°N 95.1638°W

Jackson Township is a township in Shelby County, Iowa. There are 274 people and 7.7 people per square mile in Jackson Township. The total area is 35.7 square miles.
