= Jefferson Township, Shelby County, Iowa =

Jefferson Township
- Township
- Interactive map of Jefferson Township
- Coordinates: 41°48′N 95°12′W
- Country: United States
- State: Iowa
- County: Shelby

Area
  - Total: 35.7 sq mi (92 km^{2})

Population (2010)
  - Total: 593
  - Density: 16.6/sq mi (6.41/km^{2})
- Time zone: UTC-6 (CST)
  - Summer (DST): UTC-5 (CDT)

Jefferson Township is a township in Shelby County, Iowa. There are 737 people and 20.6 people per square mile in Jefferson Township. The total area is 35.7 square miles.
