= Exira Township, Audubon County, Iowa =

Township in Iowa, US

Exira Township, Audubon County
- Township
- Coordinates: 41°33′05″N 094°52′40″W
- Country: United States
- State: Iowa
- County: Audubon

Area
  - Total: 38.5 sq mi (99.6 km^{2})
  - Land: 38.3 sq mi (99.3 km^{2})
  - Water: 0.12 sq mi (0.3 km^{2})
- Elevation: 1,325 ft (404 m)

Population (2010)
  - Total: 1,178
  - Density: 31/sq mi (11.9/km^{2})
- FIPS code: 19-91260
- GNIS feature ID: 0467804

Exira Township is one of twelve townships in Audubon County, Iowa, United States. As of the 2010 census, its population was 1,178.

== History ==
Exira Township was organized in 1874.

== Geography ==
Exira Township covers an area of 38.3 square miles (99.3 km^{2}) and contains two incorporated settlements: Brayton and Exira. According to the USGS, it contains four cemeteries: Bowen, Exira, Holy Trinity and Oakfield.
