= Greeley Township, Shelby County, Iowa =

Township in Shelby County, Iowa, U.S.

Coordinates: 41.8208°N 95.2671°W

Greeley Township is a township in Shelby County, Iowa. There are 121 people and 3.4 people per square mile in Greeley Township. The total area is 35.7 square miles.
