= Cameron Township, Audubon County, Iowa =

Township in Iowa, US

Cameron Township, Audubon County
- Township
- Coordinates: 41°49′25″N 094°55′03″W
- Country: United States
- State: Iowa
- County: Audubon

Area
  - Total: 35.80 sq mi (92.73 km^{2})
  - Land: 35.80 sq mi (92.73 km^{2})
  - Water: 0 sq mi (0 km^{2})
- Elevation: 1,483 ft (452 m)

Population (2010)
  - Total: 135
  - Density: 3.9/sq mi (1.5/km^{2})
- ZIP code: 50025
- Area code: 712
- FIPS code: 19-90453
- GNIS feature ID: 0467524

Cameron Township is one of twelve townships in Audubon County, Iowa, United States. As of the 2010 census, its population was 135.

== History ==
Cameron Township was organized in 1874.

== Geography ==
Cameron Township covers an area of 35.8 square miles (92.7 km^{2}) and contains no incorporated settlements. According to the USGS, it contains one cemetery, Cameron.
