= Clay Township, Shelby County, Iowa =

Township in Shelby County, Iowa, U.S.

Coordinates: 41°32′N 95°4′W

Clay Township is a township in Shelby County, Iowa. There are 928 people and 23.5 people per square mile in Clay Township. The total area is 39.6 square miles.
