= Leroy Township, Audubon County, Iowa =

Township in Iowa, US

Leroy Township, Audubon County
- Township
- Coordinates: 41°43′50″N 094°55′14″W
- Country: United States
- State: Iowa
- County: Audubon

Area
  - Total: 36.8 sq mi (95.4 km^{2})
  - Land: 36.8 sq mi (95.4 km^{2})
  - Water: 0 sq mi (0 km^{2})
- Elevation: 1,434 ft (437 m)

Population (2010)
  - Total: 2,496
  - Density: 68/sq mi (26.2/km^{2})
- FIPS code: 19-92418
- GNIS feature ID: 0468205

Leroy Township is one of twelve townships in Audubon County, Iowa, United States. As of the 2010 census, its population was 2,496.

== History ==
Leroy Township was organized in 1873.

== Geography ==
Leroy Township covers an area of 36.8 square miles (95.4 km^{2}) and contains one incorporated settlement, Audubon. According to the USGS, it contains five cemeteries: Aretas Lodge, Arlington Heights, Luccocks Grove, Maple Grove and Saint Patrick's Catholic Cemetery.
