= Irwin Consolidated School =

- U.S. National Register of Historic Places
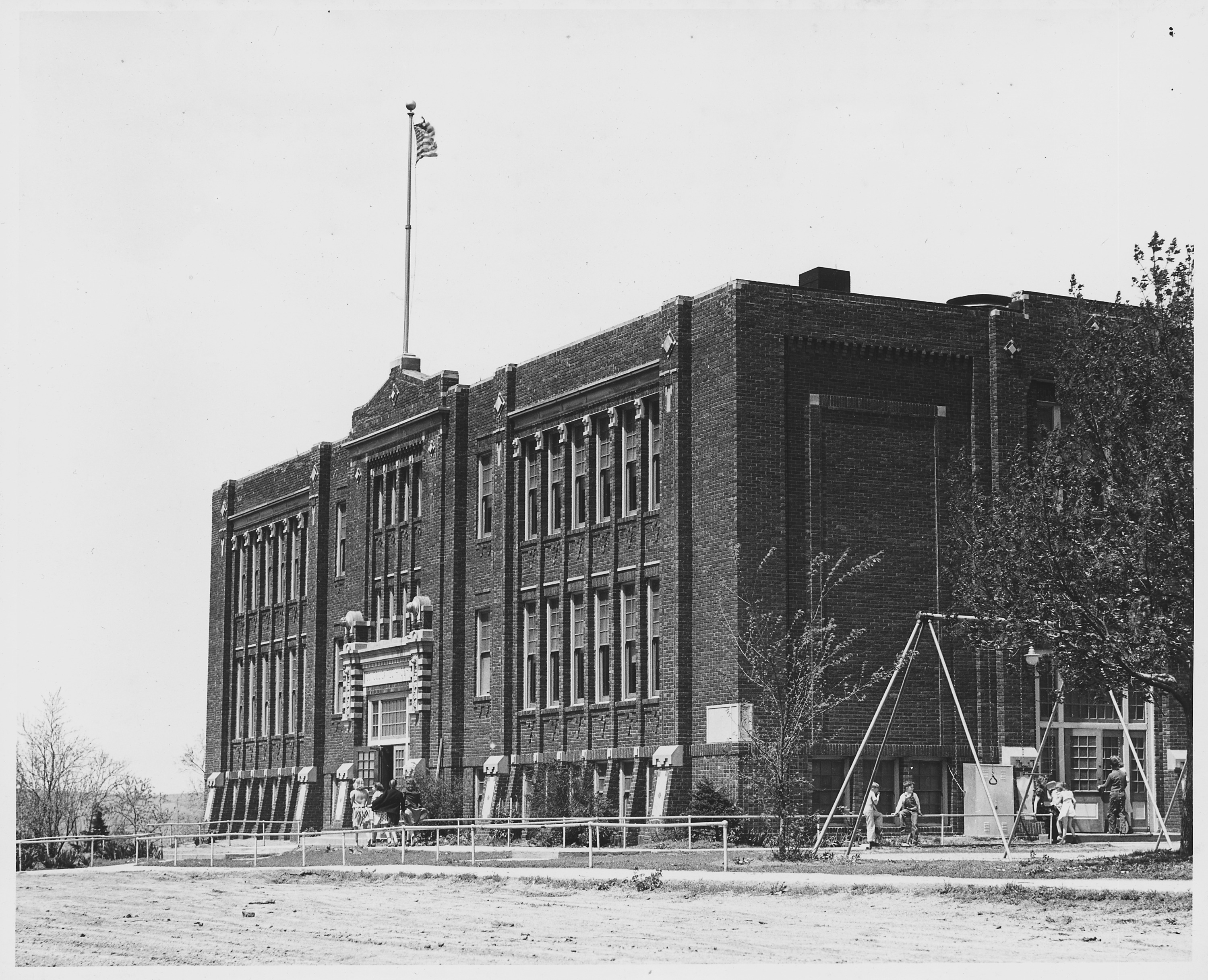

- Location within Iowa Location within the United States
- Location: North Street; Irwin, Iowa
- Coordinates: 41°47′41″N 95°12′22″W
- Area: 1 acre (0.40 ha)
- Built: 1917-1918
- Architect: William F. Gernandt
- Architectural style: Late 19th and 20th Century Revivals, Late 19th And Early 20th Century American Movements
- MPS: Public Schools for Iowa: Growth and Change MPS
- NRHP reference No.: 02001246
- Added to NRHP: October 24, 2002

The Irwin Consolidated School in Irwin, Iowa was opened for classes in the fall of 1918. The cornerstone dates the building as being built in 1917 by William F. Gernandt, Architect of Omaha, Nebraska.

It was built to replace a wooden structure and a number of country schools and to be able to add courses to the curriculum. The building has been placed on the National Register of Historic Places, as are a number of buildings by William F. Gernandt. The building is of brick construction with many sandstone and art deco features. It is quite ornate in comparison to other school buildings built in the area and of that time period. The school to this date still has much of the original oak woodwork, doors and cabinetry.

The school's first years staff was: Supt. S. A. Guiles, Miss Keller, Miss Kimberly, Mary Steenhusen Welsch, Mary Farrington Torpy, Myrtle Peterson Miller, Miss Wyatt, Mrs. S. A. Guiles, Alice Fogarty, Miss Brockman and Miss Zella Cozad. The Irwin High School was renowned academically and also excelled in sports winning many state championships. In the late 1920s the school was one of the stops for the Harlem Globe Trotters and on that night the home team won. In 1939 the city of Irwin was one of six communities for a special government study of the effects of the depression and of the New Deal Program. In 1942 a photo essay followed up this study with many photos of the school being preserved in the National Archives.

The last classes were held in 2002. In 2005, the building was sold and converted to the C. G. Brisee Genealogy Library.

== See also ==
- List of Registered Historic Places in Iowa
