= Gray, Iowa =

- City
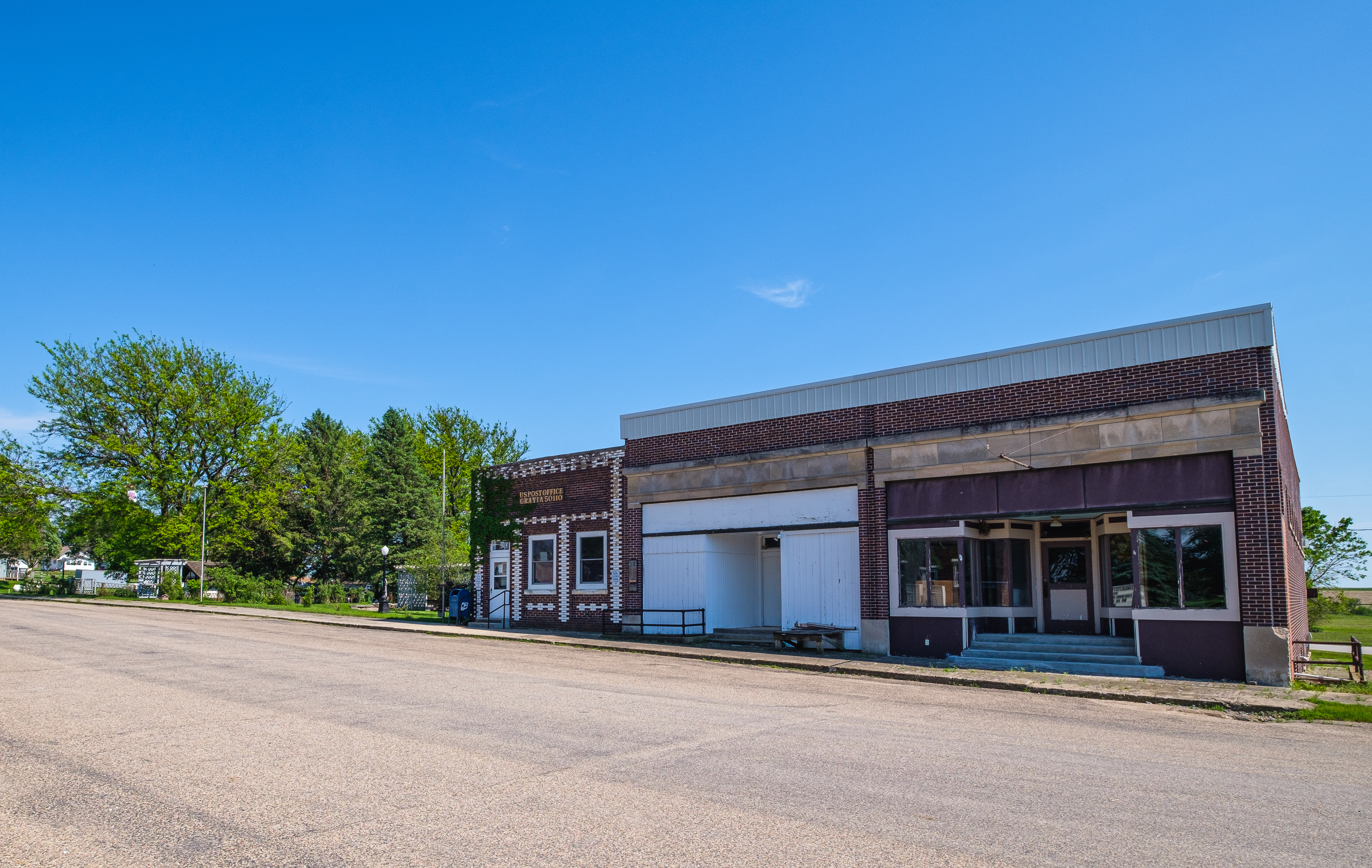
- Looking southeast from 1st and Main Streets

- Location of Gray, Iowa
- Coordinates: 41°50′30″N 94°59′09″W
- Country: US
- State: Iowa
- County: Audubon

Area
  - Total: 1.00 sq mi (2.58 km^{2})
  - Land: 1.00 sq mi (2.58 km^{2})
  - Water: 0 sq mi (0.00 km^{2})
- Elevation: 1,362 ft (415 m)

Population (2020)
  - Total: 61
  - Density: 61.2/sq mi (23.64/km^{2})
- Time zone: UTC-6 (Central (CST))
  - Summer (DST): UTC-5 (CDT)
- ZIP code: 50110
- Area code: 712
- FIPS code: 19-32565
- GNIS feature ID: 2394969

Gray is a city in Audubon County, Iowa, United States, along the East Branch of the West Nishnabotna River. The population was 61 at the time of the 2020 census.

== History ==
Gray was laid out in 1881 by George Gray, and named for him. The Northwestern railroad was extended to the town in 1882.

== Geography ==
According to the United States Census Bureau, the city has a total area of 1.00 square mile (2.59 km^{2}), all of it land.

== Demographics ==
Historical populations
Year	Pop.	±%
1900	180	—
1910	148	−17.8%
1920	196	+32.4%
1930	194	−1.0%
1940	182	−6.2%
1950	183	+0.5%
1960	162	−11.5%
1970	145	−10.5%
1980	108	−25.5%
1990	83	−23.1%
2000	82	−1.2%
2010	63	−23.2%
2020	61	−3.2%
Source:"U.S. Census website". United States Census Bureau. and Iowa Data Center; Source: U.S. Decennial Census

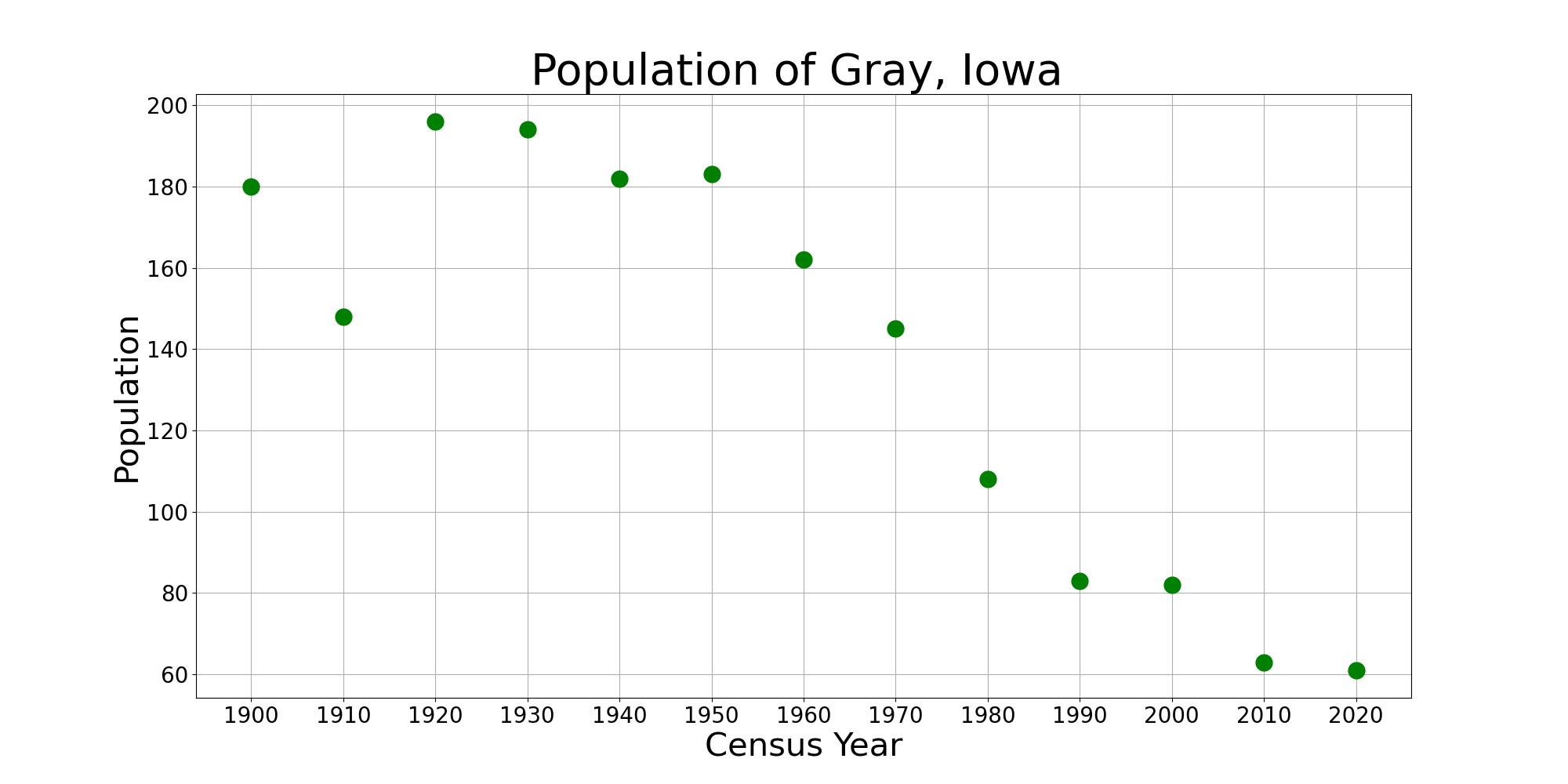
The population of Gray, Iowa from US census data

=== 2020 census ===
As of the census of 2020, there were 61 people, 18 households, and 17 families residing in the city. The population density was 61.2 inhabitants per square mile (23.6/km^{2}). There were 36 housing units at an average density of 36.1 per square mile (14.0/km^{2}). The racial makeup of the city was 88.5% White, 1.6% Black or African American, 0.0% Native American, 0.0% Asian, 0.0% Pacific Islander, 1.6% from other races and 8.2% from two or more races. Hispanic or Latino persons of any race comprised 3.3% of the population.

Of the 18 households, 33.3% of which had children under the age of 18 living with them, 55.6% were married couples living together, 22.2% were cohabitating couples, 22.2% had a female householder with no spouse or partner present and 0.0% had a male householder with no spouse or partner present. 5.6% of all households were non-families. 5.6% of all households were made up of individuals, 5.6% had someone living alone who was 65 years old or older.

The median age in the city was 35.2 years. 32.8% of the residents were under the age of 20; 6.6% were between the ages of 20 and 24; 19.7% were from 25 and 44; 21.3% were from 45 and 64; and 19.7% were 65 years of age or older. The gender makeup of the city was 50.8% male and 49.2% female.

=== 2010 census ===
As of the census of 2010, there were 63 people, 28 households, and 15 families residing in the city. The population density was 63.0 inhabitants per square mile (24.3/km^{2}). There were 36 housing units at an average density of 36.0 per square mile (13.9/km^{2}). The racial makeup of the city was 98.4% White and 1.6% from two or more races.

There were 28 households, of which 21.4% had children under the age of 18 living with them, 42.9% were married couples living together, 3.6% had a female householder with no husband present, 7.1% had a male householder with no wife present, and 46.4% were non-families. 39.3% of all households were made up of individuals, and 14.3% had someone living alone who was 65 years of age or older. The average household size was 2.25 and the average family size was 2.87.

The median age in the city was 41.3 years. 20.6% of residents were under the age of 18; 17.4% were between the ages of 18 and 24; 17.5% were from 25 to 44; 22.2% were from 45 to 64; and 22.2% were 65 years of age or older. The gender makeup of the city was 46.0% male and 54.0% female.

=== 2000 census ===
As of the census of 2000, there were 82 people, 34 households, and 24 families residing in the city. The population density was 81.9 inhabitants per square mile (31.6/km^{2}). There were 43 housing units at an average density of 43.0 per square mile (16.6/km^{2}). The racial makeup of the city was 100.00% White.

There were 34 households, out of which 23.5% had children under the age of 18 living with them, 64.7% were married couples living together, 8.8% had a female householder with no husband present, and 26.5% were non-families. 26.5% of all households were made up of individuals, and 8.8% had someone living alone who was 65 years of age or older. The average household size was 2.41 and the average family size was 2.92.

In the city, the population was spread out, with 25.6% under the age of 18, 6.1% from 18 to 24, 18.3% from 25 to 44, 25.6% from 45 to 64, and 24.4% who were 65 years of age or older. The median age was 45 years. For every 100 females, there were 95.2 males. For every 100 females age 18 and over, there were 79.4 males.

The median income for a household in the city was $35,750, and the median income for a family was $48,750. Males had a median income of $26,875 versus $23,333 for females. The per capita income for the city was $18,190. There were no families and 2.4% of the population living below the poverty line, including no under eighteens and 9.1% of those over 64.
