= Kirkman, Iowa =

- City
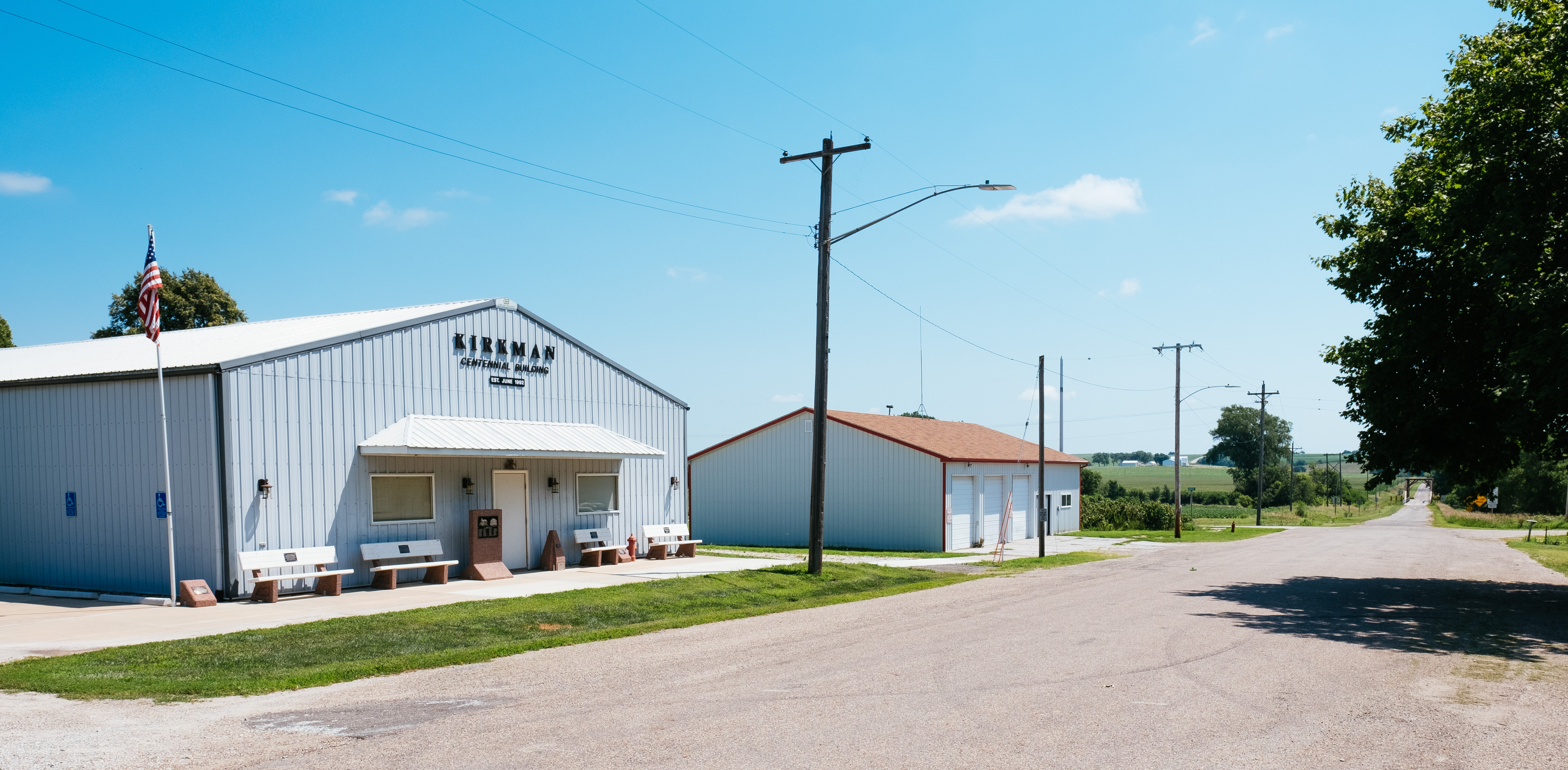
- Centennial Building and Fire Department in Kirkman

- Location of Kirkman, Iowa
- Coordinates: 41°43′43″N 95°16′01″W
- Country: United States
- State: Iowa
- County: Shelby

Area
  - Total: 0.25 sq mi (0.65 km^{2})
  - Land: 0.25 sq mi (0.65 km^{2})
  - Water: 0 sq mi (0.00 km^{2})
- Elevation: 1,266 ft (386 m)

Population (2020)
  - Total: 56
  - Density: 221.9/sq mi (85.68/km^{2})
- Time zone: UTC-6 (Central (CST))
  - Summer (DST): UTC-5 (CDT)
- ZIP code: 51447
- Area code: 712
- FIPS code: 19-41520
- GNIS feature ID: 2395546
- Website: www.developsource.com/kirkman.html

Kirkman is a city in Shelby County, Iowa, United States, along the West Nishnabotna River. The population was 56 at the time of the 2020 census.

== History ==
Kirkman had its start by the building of the Chicago & North Western Railway through that territory.

Kirkman was established by the Western Town Lot Company in 1880, and incorporated in 1892. The town was named after M.M. Kirkman, a railroad official, and the first house in the town was Kirkman House.

== Geography ==
According to the United States Census Bureau, the city has a total area of 0.28 square miles (0.73 km^{2}), all of it land.

== Demographics ==
Historical populations
Year	Pop.	±%
1900	203	—
1910	180	−11.3%
1920	204	+13.3%
1930	183	−10.3%
1940	185	+1.1%
1950	131	−29.2%
1960	92	−29.8%
1970	72	−21.7%
1980	95	+31.9%
1990	98	+3.2%
2000	76	−22.4%
2010	64	−15.8%
2020	56	−12.5%
Source:"U.S. Census website". United States Census Bureau. and Iowa Data Center; Source: U.S. Decennial Census

=== 2020 census ===
As of the census of 2020, there were 56 people, 32 households, and 23 families residing in the city. The population density was 221.9 inhabitants per square mile (85.7/km^{2}). There were 35 housing units at an average density of 138.7 per square mile (53.6/km^{2}). The racial makeup of the city was 92.9% White, 0.0% Black or African American, 0.0% Native American, 3.6% Asian, 0.0% Pacific Islander, 1.8% from other races and 1.8% from two or more races. Hispanic or Latino persons of any race comprised 7.1% of the population.

Of the 32 households, 34.4% of which had children under the age of 18 living with them, 62.5% were married couples living together, 12.5% were cohabitating couples, 6.2% had a female householder with no spouse or partner present and 18.8% had a male householder with no spouse or partner present. 28.1% of all households were non-families. 18.8% of all households were made up of individuals, 12.5% had someone living alone who was 65 years old or older.

The median age in the city was 60.0 years. 16.1% of the residents were under the age of 20; 5.4% were between the ages of 20 and 24; 14.3% were from 25 and 44; 21.4% were from 45 and 64; and 42.9% were 65 years of age or older. The gender makeup of the city was 62.5% male and 37.5% female.

=== 2010 census ===
As of the census of 2010, there were 64 people, 33 households, and 23 families residing in the city. The population density was 228.6 inhabitants per square mile (88.3/km^{2}). There were 37 housing units at an average density of 132.1 per square mile (51.0/km^{2}). The racial makeup of the city was 96.9% White, 1.6% Pacific Islander, and 1.6% from other races. Hispanic or Latino people of any race were 3.1% of the population.

There were 33 households, of which 15.2% had children under the age of 18 living with them, 60.6% were married couples living together, 6.1% had a female householder with no husband present, 3.0% had a male householder with no wife present, and 30.3% were non-families. 30.3% of all households were made up of individuals, and 9.1% had someone living alone who was 65 years of age or older. The average household size was 1.94 and the average family size was 2.30.

The median age in the city was 56.5 years. 10.9% of residents were under the age of 18; 6.4% were between the ages of 18 and 24; 11% were from 25 to 44; 56.3% were from 45 to 64; and 15.6% were 65 years of age or older. The gender makeup of the city was 56.3% male and 43.8% female.

=== 2000 census ===
As of the census of 2000, there were 76 people, 35 households, and 17 families residing in the city. The population density was 266.3 inhabitants per square mile (102.8/km^{2}). There were 36 housing units at an average density of 126.2 per square mile (48.7/km^{2}). The racial makeup of the city was 97.37% White, 1.32% Asian, 1.32% from other races. Hispanic or Latino people of any race were 2.63% of the population.

There were 35 households, out of which 20.0% had children under the age of 18 living with them, 45.7% were married couples living together, 2.9% had a female householder with no husband present, and 48.6% were non-families. 31.4% of all households were made up of individuals, and 11.4% had someone living alone who was 65 years of age or older. The average household size was 2.17 and the average family size was 2.83.

In the city, the population was spread out, with 22.4% under the age of 18, 9.2% from 18 to 24, 22.4% from 25 to 44, 32.9% from 45 to 64, and 13.2% who were 65 years of age or older. The median age was 42 years. For every 100 females there were 130.3 males. For every 100 females age 18 and over, there were 118.5 males.

The median income for a household in the city was $49,375, and the median income for a family was $55,000. Males had a median income of $31,875 versus $18,125 for females. The per capita income for the city was $16,941. There were 15.0% of families and 11.8% of the population living below the poverty line, including 10.5% of under eighteens and 46.2% of those over 64.

== Education ==
Kirkman is served by the IKM–Manning Community School District.

It was previously in the IKM Community School District, which formed on July 1, 1992. That in turn, on July 1, 2011, merged into IKM–Manning.

== Notable people ==
Kirkman was the birthplace of Lew Anderson, who played Clarabell the Clown on Howdy Doody.
