= Shelby Township, Shelby County, Iowa =

Township in Shelby County, Iowa, U.S.

Coordinates: 41.5662°N 95.4461°W

Shelby Township is a township in Shelby County, Iowa. There are 959 people and 24.3 people per square mile in Shelby Township. The total area is 39.5 square miles.
