= Audubon County, Iowa =

County in Iowa, United States

- County
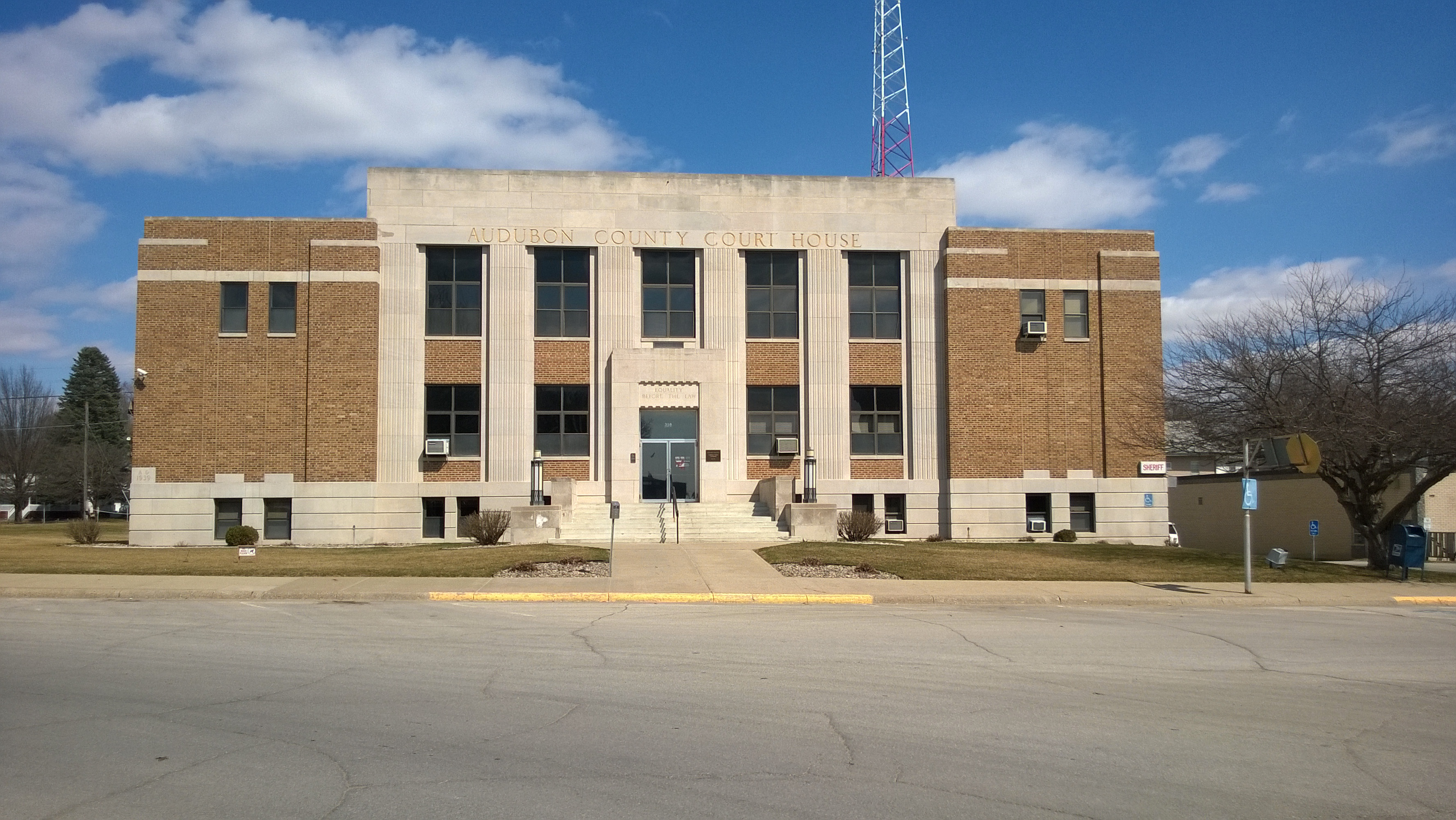
- Audubon County Courthouse in Audubon

- Location within the U.S. state of Iowa
- Coordinates: 41°41′05″N 94°54′29″W
- Country: United States
- State: Iowa
- Founded: 1851
- Named for: John James Audubon
- Seat: Audubon
- Largest city: Audubon

Area
  - Total: 443 sq mi (1,150 km^{2})
  - Land: 443 sq mi (1,150 km^{2})
  - Water: 0.4 sq mi (1.0 km^{2}) 0.1%

Population (2020)
  - Total: 5,674
  - Estimate (2025): 5,509 ▼
  - Density: 12.8/sq mi (4.95/km^{2})
- Time zone: UTC−6 (Central)
  - Summer (DST): UTC−5 (CDT)
- Congressional district: 4th
- Website: www.auduboncountyia.gov
- Iowa county number 05

Audubon County is a county in the U.S. state of Iowa. As of the 2020 census, the population was 5,674, making it Iowa's third-least populous county. Its county seat is Audubon. The county was named after John James Audubon, the naturalist and artist.

== History ==
Audubon County was formed on January 15, 1851, from sections of Pottawattamie County. It was named after John James Audubon. The current Audubon County Court House was opened in 1940.

== Geography ==
According to the U.S. Census Bureau, the county has an area of 443 square miles (1,150 km^{2}), of which 443 square miles (1,150 km^{2}) is land and 0.4 square miles (1.0 km^{2}) (0.1%) is water.

Soils of Audubon County

=== Major highways ===
- U.S. Highway 71
- Iowa Highway 44
- Iowa Highway 173

=== Adjacent counties ===
- Carroll County (north)
- Guthrie County (east)
- Cass County (south)
- Shelby County (west)

== Demographics ==
Historical population
Census	Pop.	Note	%±
1860	454		—
1870	1,212		167.0%
1880	7,448		514.5%
1890	12,412		66.6%
1900	13,626		9.8%
1910	12,671		−7.0%
1920	12,520		−1.2%
1930	12,264		−2.0%
1940	11,790		−3.9%
1950	11,579		−1.8%
1960	10,919		−5.7%
1970	9,595		−12.1%
1980	8,559		−10.8%
1990	7,334		−14.3%
2000	6,830		−6.9%
2010	6,119		−10.4%
2020	5,674		−7.3%
2025 (est.)	5,509	▼	−2.9%
U.S. Decennial Census; 1790–1960 1900–1990; 1990–2000 2010–2020

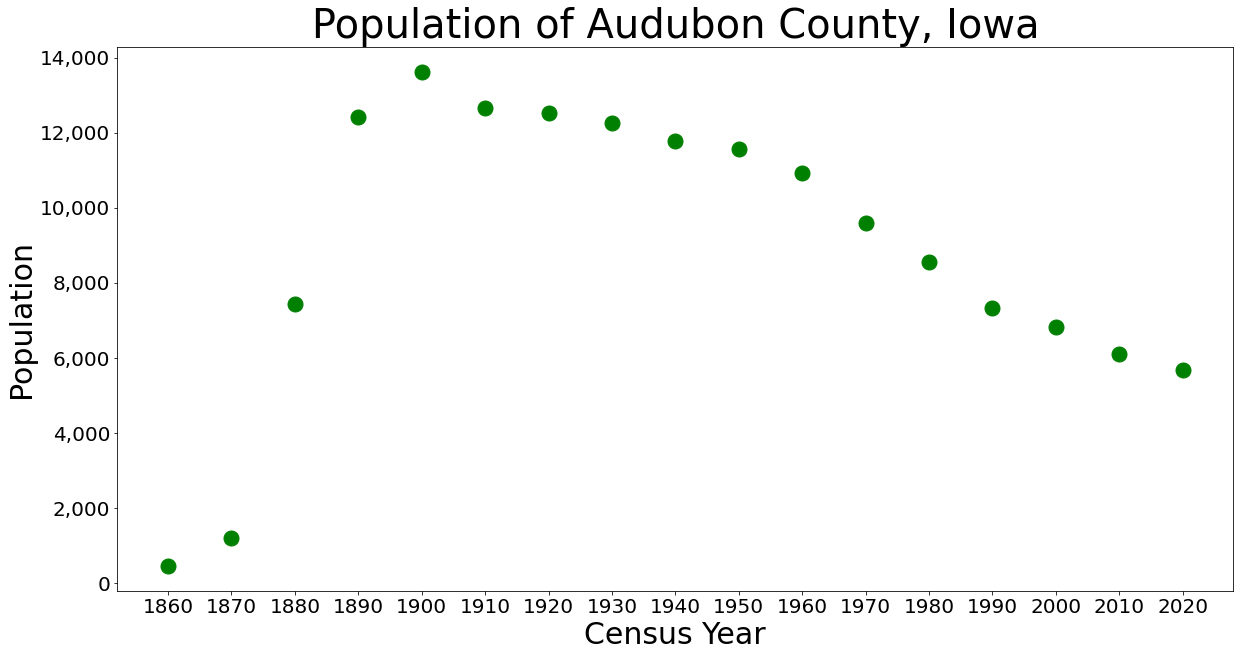
Population of Audubon County from the U.S. census data

=== 2020 census ===
As of the 2020 census, the county had a population of 5,674 and a population density of 12.8/sq mi (4.9/km^{2}). The median age was 47.3 years. 21.8% of residents were under the age of 18 and 24.9% of residents were 65 years of age or older. For every 100 females there were 99.0 males, and for every 100 females age 18 and over there were 97.2 males age 18 and over.

The racial makeup of the county was 96.4% White, 0.3% Black or African American, 0.1% American Indian and Alaska Native, 0.1% Asian, <0.1% Native Hawaiian and Pacific Islander, 0.5% from some other race, and 2.6% from two or more races. Hispanic or Latino residents of any race comprised 1.5% of the population. The census also reported that 97.41% of residents reported being of one race, of whom 94.87% were non-Hispanic White, 0.30% were Black, 1.52% were Hispanic, 0.09% were Native American, 0.09% were Asian, 0.02% were Native Hawaiian or Pacific Islander, and 3.12% were some other race or more than one race.

<0.1% of residents lived in urban areas, while 100.0% lived in rural areas.

There were 2,498 households in the county, of which 24.0% had children under the age of 18 living in them. Of all households, 51.6% were married-couple households, 19.6% were households with a male householder and no spouse or partner present, and 22.7% were households with a female householder and no spouse or partner present. About 32.6% of all households were made up of individuals and 17.0% had someone living alone who was 65 years of age or older.

There were 2,787 housing units, of which 10.4% were vacant. Among occupied housing units, 80.6% were owner-occupied and 19.4% were renter-occupied. The homeowner vacancy rate was 1.5% and the rental vacancy rate was 10.8%.

=== 2010 census ===
The 2010 census recorded a population of 6,119 in the county, with a population density of 13.8/sq mi (5.3/km^{2}). There were 2,972 housing units, of which 2,617 were occupied.

=== 2000 census ===
As of the 2000 census, there were 6,830 people, 2,773 households, and 1,927 families residing in the county. The population density was 15 people per square mile (5.8 people/km^{2}). There were 2,995 housing units at an average density of 7 units per square mile (2.7 units/km^{2}). The racial makeup of the county was 99.17% White, 0.15% Black or African American, 0.09% Native American, 0.19% Asian, 0.03% from other races, and 0.38% from two or more races. 0.48% of the population were Hispanic or Latino of any race.

There were 2,773 households, out of which 30.10% had children under the age of 18 living with them, 61.40% were married couples living together, 5.60% had a female householder with no husband present, and 30.50% were non-families. 28.20% of all households were made up of individuals, and 16.70% had someone living alone who was 65 years of age or older. The average household size was 2.40 and the average family size was 2.94.

In the county, the population was spread out, with 25.90% under the age of 18, 5.00% from 18 to 24, 22.70% from 25 to 44, 22.90% from 45 to 64, and 23.50% who were 65 years of age or older. The median age was 42 years. For every 100 females there were 92.00 males. For every 100 females age 18 and over, there were 89.10 males.

The median income for a household in the county was $32,215, and the median income for a family was $37,288. Males had a median income of $28,090 versus $17,528 for females. The per capita income for the county was $17,489. About 6.70% of families and 7.70% of the population were below the poverty line, including 8.20% of those under age 18 and 7.80% of those age 65 or over.

== Communities ==
=== Cities ===
- Audubon
- Brayton
- Exira
- Gray
- Kimballton

=== Townships ===
Audubon County is divided into twelve townships:

- Audubon
- Cameron
- Douglas
- Exira
- Greeley
- Hamlin
- Leroy
- Lincoln
- Melville
- Oakfield
- Sharon
- Viola

=== Population ranking ===
The population ranking of the following table is based on the 2020 census of Audubon County. † county seat

Rank	City/Town/etc.	Municipal type	Population (2020 Census)	Population (2024 Estimate)
1	† Audubon	City	2,053	1,995
2	Exira	City	787	763
3	Kimballton	City	291	281
4	Brayton	City	143	132
5	Gray	City	61	54

== Politics ==
United States presidential election results for Audubon County, Iowa
Year	Republican		Democratic		Third party(ies)	
Year	No.	%	No.	%	No.	%
1896	1,705	54.14%	1,417	45.00%	27	0.86%
1900	1,821	57.86%	1,301	41.34%	25	0.79%
1904	1,843	64.99%	934	32.93%	59	2.08%
1908	1,701	60.86%	1,050	37.57%	44	1.57%
1912	692	26.15%	963	36.39%	991	37.45%
1916	1,581	55.61%	1,247	43.86%	15	0.53%
1920	2,963	67.68%	1,405	32.09%	10	0.23%
1924	2,475	53.86%	965	21.00%	1,155	25.14%
1928	2,340	49.44%	2,364	49.95%	29	0.61%
1932	1,604	34.62%	2,986	64.45%	43	0.93%
1936	2,344	40.14%	3,448	59.05%	47	0.80%
1940	2,632	44.80%	3,236	55.08%	7	0.12%
1944	2,346	43.07%	3,094	56.80%	7	0.13%
1948	2,177	42.25%	2,840	55.11%	136	2.64%
1952	3,605	61.85%	2,220	38.09%	4	0.07%
1956	3,057	54.16%	2,585	45.80%	2	0.04%
1960	2,935	53.05%	2,595	46.91%	2	0.04%
1964	1,871	38.30%	3,011	61.64%	3	0.06%
1968	2,592	57.55%	1,710	37.97%	202	4.48%
1972	2,515	61.61%	1,533	37.56%	34	0.83%
1976	1,978	47.86%	2,104	50.91%	51	1.23%
1980	2,523	57.96%	1,546	35.52%	284	6.52%
1984	2,306	54.97%	1,854	44.20%	35	0.83%
1988	1,478	43.84%	1,863	55.27%	30	0.89%
1992	1,373	35.45%	1,589	41.03%	911	23.52%
1996	1,314	37.67%	1,827	52.38%	347	9.95%
2000	1,909	50.45%	1,780	47.04%	95	2.51%
2004	1,958	54.51%	1,608	44.77%	26	0.72%
2008	1,634	47.56%	1,739	50.61%	63	1.83%
2012	1,802	52.13%	1,611	46.60%	44	1.27%
2016	2,136	62.60%	1,080	31.65%	196	5.74%
2020	2,295	67.11%	1,071	31.32%	54	1.58%
2024	2,214	68.14%	970	29.86%	65	2.00%

== See also ==
- National Register of Historic Places listings in Audubon County, Iowa
- Audubon County Court House
