= Grove Township, Shelby County, Iowa =

Township in Shelby County, Iowa, U.S.

Coordinates: 41.8086°N 95.4994°W

Grove Township is a township in Shelby County, Iowa. As of 2023, There are 133 people and 3.6 people per square mile in Grove Township. The total area is 36.7 square miles.
