= Douglass Township =

Douglass Township may refer to the following places in the United States:

- Douglass Township, Butler County, Kansas
- Douglass Township, Michigan
- Douglass Township, Berks County, Pennsylvania
- Douglass Township, Montgomery County, Pennsylvania

== See also ==
- Douglas Township (disambiguation)
