= Greeley Township, Audubon County, Iowa =

Township in Iowa, US

Greeley Township, Audubon County
- Township
- Coordinates: 41°38′54″N 094°47′48″W
- Country: United States
- State: Iowa
- County: Audubon

Area
  - Total: 35.77 sq mi (92.65 km^{2})
  - Land: 35.70 sq mi (92.45 km^{2})
  - Water: 0.081 sq mi (0.21 km^{2})
- Elevation: 1,391 ft (424 m)

Population (2010)
  - Total: 170
  - Density: 4.7/sq mi (1.8/km^{2})
- FIPS code: 19-91728
- GNIS feature ID: 0467963

Greeley Township is one of twelve townships in Audubon County, Iowa, United States. As of the 2010 census, its population was 170.

== History ==
Greeley Township was organized in 1873.

== Geography ==
Greeley Township covers an area of 35.77 square miles (92.65 km^{2}) and contains no incorporated settlements.
