= Botna, Iowa =

Botna
- Unincorporated community
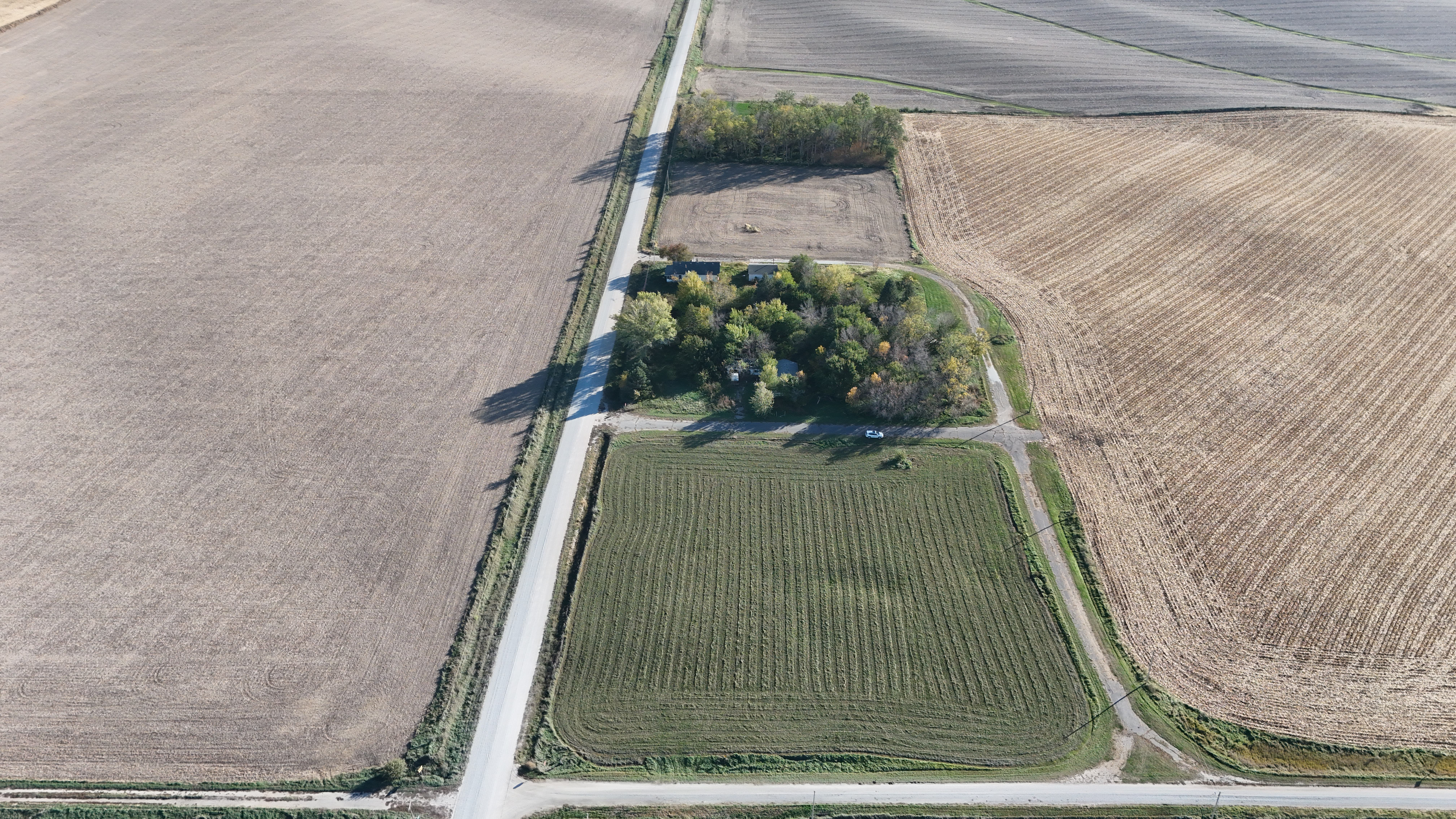
- Botna, looking south along county road M56

- Location within the state of Iowa Botna (the United States)
- Coordinates: 41°51′21″N 95°07′53″W
- Country: United States
- State: Iowa
- County: Shelby
- Elevation: 1,309 ft (399 m)
- Time zone: UTC-6 (Central (CST))
  - Summer (DST): UTC-5 (CDT)
- ZIP codes: 51454
- Area code: 712
- GNIS feature ID: 454767

Botna is an unincorporated community in Shelby County, Iowa, in the United States, located near the West Nishnabotna River.

== History ==
Botna was platted in 1884. It was originally named Rochdale, after an English town of the same name. The name Botna is a shortened reference to the name of the nearby river.

Botna's population was 37 in 1902, and 75 in 1925. The population was 50 in 1940.
