= Fairview Township, Shelby County, Iowa =

Township in Shelby County, Iowa, U.S.

Coordinates: 41.5542°N 95.3264°W

Fairview Township is a township in Shelby County, Iowa. There are 258 people and 6.5 people per square mile in Fairview Township. The total area is 39.4 square miles.
