= Audubon Township, Audubon County, Iowa =

Township in Iowa, US

Audubon Township, Audubon County
- Township
- Coordinates: 41°33′40″N 094°45′04″W
- Country: United States
- State: Iowa
- County: Audubon

Area
  - Total: 40.41 sq mi (104.66 km^{2})
  - Land: 40.24 sq mi (104.22 km^{2})
  - Water: 0.17 sq mi (0.44 km^{2})
- Elevation: 1,350 ft (410 m)

Population (2010)
  - Total: 212
  - Density: 5.2/sq mi (2/km^{2})
- FIPS code: 19-90093
- GNIS feature ID: 0467403

Audubon Township is one of twelve townships in Audubon County, Iowa, United States. As of the 2010 census, its population was 212.

== History ==
Audubon Township was organized in 1873.

== Geography ==
Audubon Township covers an area of 40.4 square miles (104.7 km^{2}) and contains no incorporated settlements. According to the USGS, it contains three cemeteries: Grove, Pleasant Hill and Saint Johns.
