= Polk Township, Shelby County, Iowa =

Township in Shelby County, Iowa

Coordinates: 42.2447°N 91.8918°W

Polk Township is a township in Shelby County, Iowa. There are 133 people and 3.6 people per square mile in Polk Township. The total area is 36.7 square miles.
