= Audubon County Court House =

- U.S. National Register of Historic Places
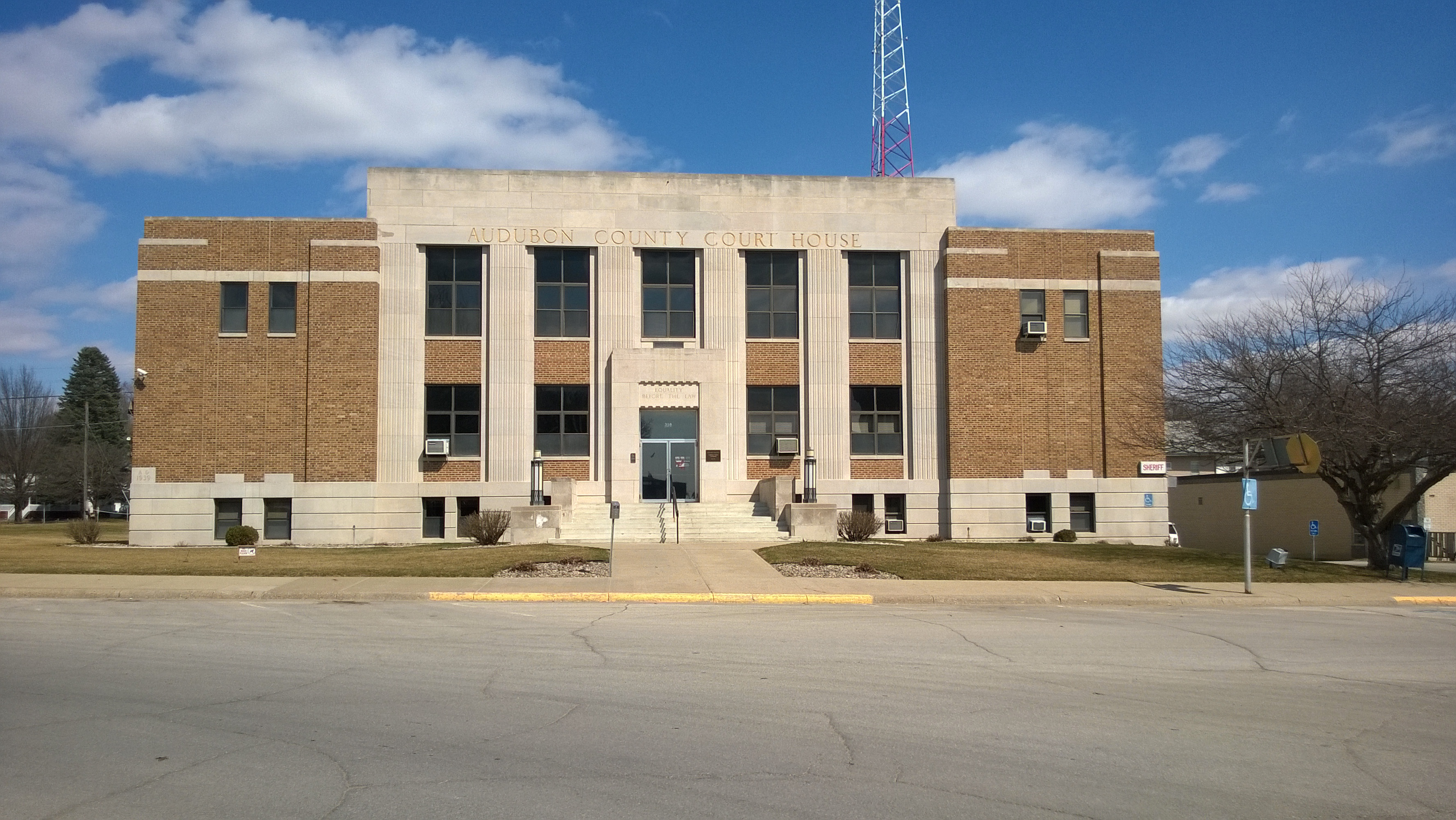
- The Audubon County courthouse in downtown Audubon

- Location within Iowa Location within the United States
- Interactive map showing the location for Audubon County Court House
- Location: 318 Leroy St. Audubon, Iowa
- Coordinates: 41°43′16″N 94°55′43″W
- Built: 1940
- Built by: J.C. Mayer
- Architects: Keffer and Jones
- Architectural style: PWA Moderne
- MPS: PWA-Era County Courthouses of IA MPS
- NRHP reference No.: 03000826
- Added to NRHP: August 28, 2003

The Audubon County Court House is located in the county seat of Audubon, Iowa, United States. It was listed on the National Register of Historic Places in 2003 as a part of the PWA-Era County Courthouses of IA Multiple Properties Submission. The courthouse is the third building the county has used for court functions and county administration.

== History ==
After the county was established in 1851, the court was held in a schoolhouse in the former community of Hamlin's Grove. Ten years later, the county seat relocated to Exira and a fight ensued as to where the county seat should be located. The board of supervisors made an appropriation for a new courthouse in 1871, but it was delayed due to the disagreement. Court sessions continued in the schoolhouse, while county offices were housed in a single-story building the county purchased from the county judge. Exira eventually won and officials constructed a courthouse for about $2,200. The county seat was again moved in 1879 to Audubon. The county secured $7,000 in 1884 to build a new courthouse. The 100 by 44 feet (30 by 13 m) brick building featured a central tower. It was demolished in 1939 to make way for the current structure.

In July 1938, a citizens group encouraged the county board of supervisors to apply for funding from the Public Works Administration (PWA) to build a new courthouse. The grant was approved in August of the same year and a referendum was passed by voters the following month. The Des Moines architectural firm of Keffer & Jones designed the new building. Construction bids came in well below the estimates, so the bonds were sold at a lower interest rate. The PWA grant was amended to include a new jail in the building. A 96-year-old Civil War veteran turned the first shovelful of dirt to start construction. J.C. Mayer of Clarion, Iowa, was awarded the contract to construct the building in December 1938, and it was completed at a final cost of $133,000. The courtroom was first used February 15, 1940, and county offices opened in the building a short time later. The dedication ceremony was held on June 11, 1940, with the celebration including a parade, baseball games, and a county historical pageant. Dr. Thomas Niven of First Presbyterian Church in Omaha, Nebraska, gave the keynote address.

== Architecture ==
The architectural style of the building is known as Depression Modern or PWA Moderne. The building features a symmetrical façade with a central section of two stories that is flanked by two lower sections. It is built over a raised basement. The exterior is composed of buff-colored brick and Bedford limestone trim. On the interior, the central corridors extend the length of the building. Vaults were built into the corners of the structure with the county offices opening onto the corridor. The interior features multi-colored terrazzo floors, marble wainscoting and acoustic tile. Originally, the courtroom was decorated in dark wood tones and Art Deco ornamentation.
