= Manning, Iowa =

- City
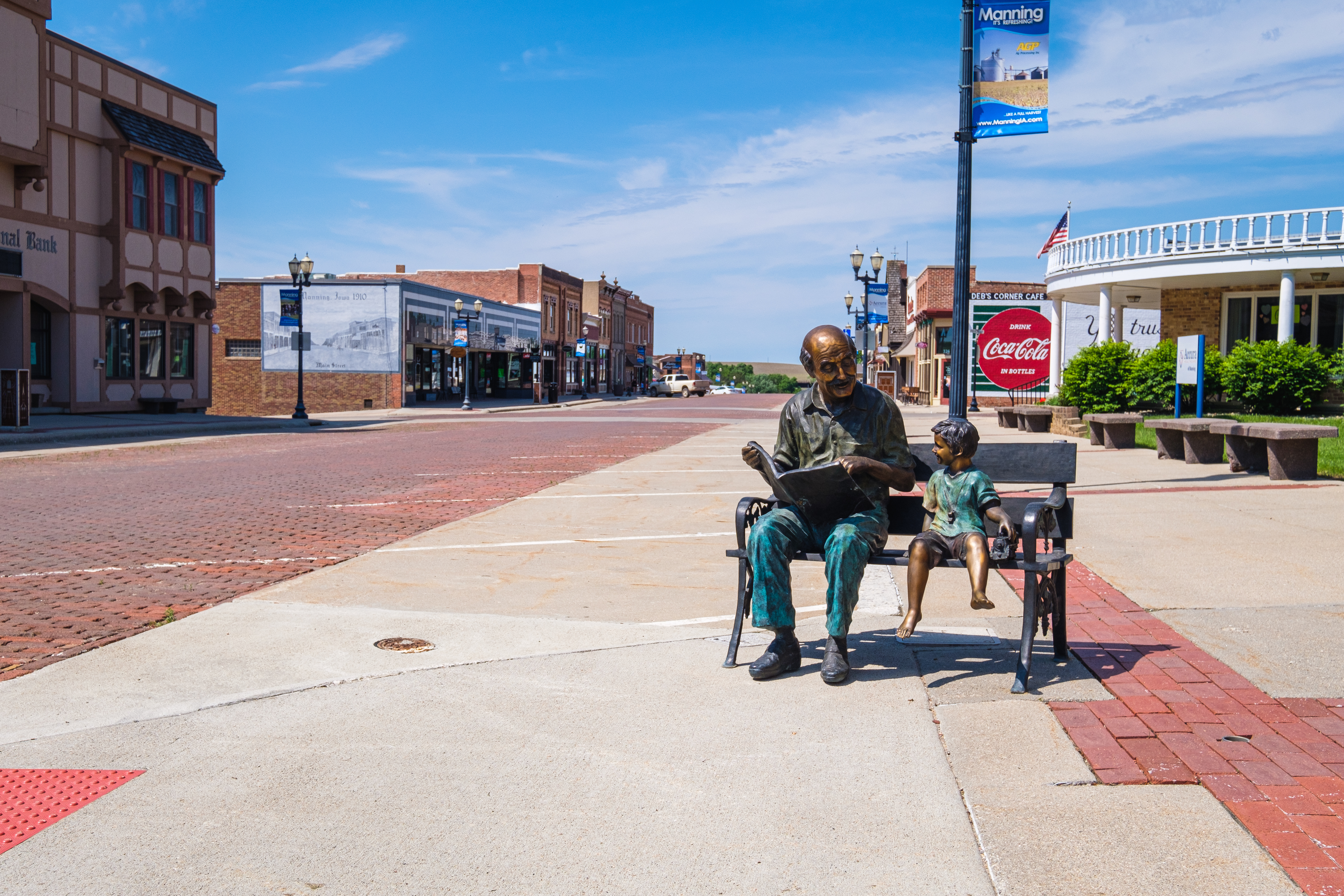
- Downtown Main Street looking north.

- Location of Manning, Iowa
- Coordinates: 41°54′33″N 95°03′51″W
- Country: USA
- State: Iowa
- County: Carroll

Area
  - Total: 2.48 sq mi (6.43 km^{2})
  - Land: 2.47 sq mi (6.41 km^{2})
  - Water: 0.0077 sq mi (0.02 km^{2})
- Elevation: 1,368 ft (417 m)

Population (2020)
  - Total: 1,455
  - Density: 587.5/sq mi (226.85/km^{2})
- Time zone: UTC-6 (Central (CST))
  - Summer (DST): UTC-5 (CDT)
- ZIP code: 51455
- Area code: 712
- FIPS code: 19-48945
- GNIS feature ID: 468338
- Website: www.manningia.com

Manning is a city in Carroll County, Iowa, United States, along Iowa Highway 141. The population was 1,455 at the time of the 2020 census. It is named for Orlando Harrison Manning, a Lieutenant Governor of Iowa.

== History ==
Prior to the city's formation, the area of Manning was a swampy region occasionally used by local Iowa people for hunting. There were no nearby rivers and few trees.

The Iowa Southwestern railroad was completed in 1880. Some yards and a depot were constructed at the future location of Manning in 1881. In the same year, the Chicago, Milwaukee, and St. Paul Railroad constructed a road across Iowa, south of and parallel to, the Northwest. These railroads intersected at what is now Manning. Many of these railroads went directly through where the Manning Park currently is.

In 1969, an unknown saboteur used dynamite to bomb one of the rails and derail the passenger train traveling on the east-west Milwaukee railroad line (presently owned and operated by the BNSF Railway), apparently hoping that it would careen into the Nishnabotna river below. The train came to a safe stop but only after it derailed. The crime was never solved; no group claimed responsibility and no motive for the bombing was ever discovered.

== Geography ==
Manning is located along the West Nishnabotna River near its source.

According to the United States Census Bureau, the city has a total area of 2.50 square miles (6.47 km^{2}), of which, 2.49 square miles (6.45 km^{2}) is land and 0.01 square miles (0.03 km^{2}) is water.

== Demographics ==
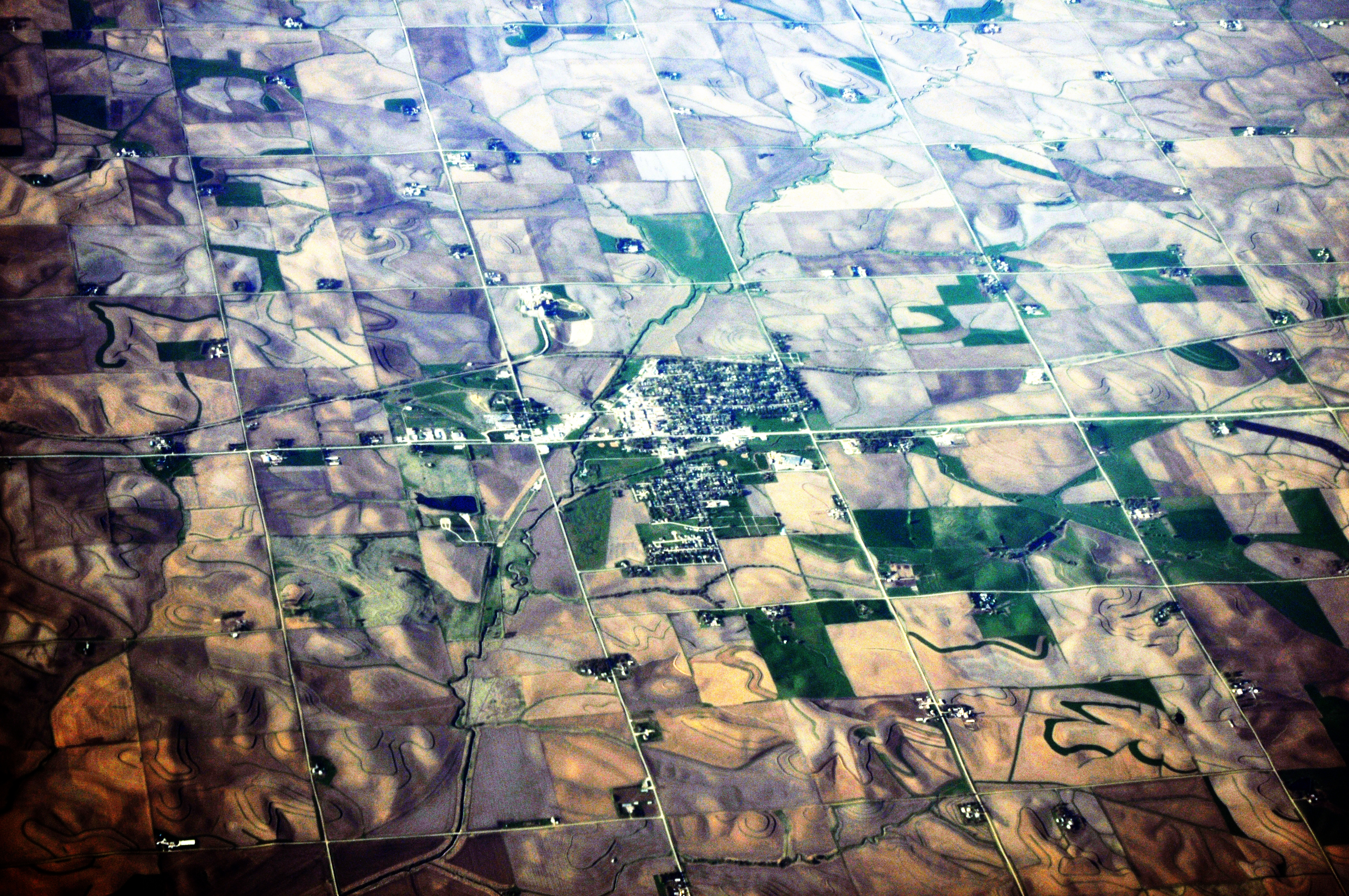
Aerial view of Manning, 2012

Historical populations
Year	Pop.	±%
1890	1,233	—
1900	1,169	−5.2%
1910	1,434	+22.7%
1920	1,863	+29.9%
1930	1,817	−2.5%
1940	1,748	−3.8%
1950	1,801	+3.0%
1960	1,676	−6.9%
1970	1,656	−1.2%
1980	1,609	−2.8%
1990	1,484	−7.8%
2000	1,490	+0.4%
2010	1,500	+0.7%
2020	1,455	−3.0%
Source:"U.S. Census website". United States Census Bureau. and Iowa Data Center; Source: U.S. Decennial Census

=== 2020 census ===
As of the 2020 census, there were 1,455 people, 651 households, and 353 families residing in the city. The population density was 587.5 inhabitants per square mile (226.9/km^{2}). There were 747 housing units at an average density of 301.6 per square mile (116.5/km^{2}).

The median age in the city was 41.5 years. 25.2% of residents were under the age of 20; 4.1% were between the ages of 20 and 24; 23.8% were from 25 to 44; 21.6% were from 45 to 64; and 25.4% were 65 years of age or older. 23.1% of residents were under the age of 18. The gender makeup of the city was 49.6% male and 50.4% female. For every 100 females, there were 98.5 males, and for every 100 females age 18 and over, there were 93.3 males age 18 and over.

Of the city's households, 24.1% had children under the age of 18 living with them. Of all households, 43.5% were married-couple households, 7.1% were cohabitating couples, 23.0% were households with a male householder and no spouse or partner present, and 26.4% were households with a female householder and no spouse or partner present. 45.8% of all households were non-families. About 41.0% of all households were made up of individuals, and 21.5% had someone living alone who was 65 years of age or older.

0.0% of residents lived in urban areas, while 100.0% lived in rural areas. Of housing units, 12.9% were vacant. The homeowner vacancy rate was 2.2% and the rental vacancy rate was 15.5%.

Racial composition as of the 2020 census
Race	Number	Percent
White	1,398	96.1%
Black or African American	0	0.0%
American Indian and Alaska Native	5	0.3%
Asian	11	0.8%
Native Hawaiian and Other Pacific Islander	0	0.0%
Some other race	4	0.3%
Two or more races	37	2.5%
Hispanic or Latino (of any race)	16	1.1%

=== 2010 census ===
As of the census of 2010, there were 1,500 people, 653 households, and 398 families residing in the city. The population density was 602.4 inhabitants per square mile (232.6/km^{2}). There were 719 housing units at an average density of 288.8 per square mile (111.5/km^{2}). The racial makeup of the city was 98.1% White, 0.7% African American, 0.4% Native American, 0.3% Asian, 0.1% from other races, and 0.5% from two or more races. Hispanic or Latino of any race were 1.1% of the population.

There were 653 households, of which 28.6% had children under the age of 18 living with them, 49.8% were married couples living together, 8.1% had a female householder with no husband present, 3.1% had a male householder with no wife present, and 39.1% were non-families. 35.1% of all households were made up of individuals, and 18.7% had someone living alone who was 65 years of age or older. The average household size was 2.19 and the average family size was 2.81.

The median age in the city was 45.5 years. 23% of residents were under the age of 18; 6.5% were between the ages of 18 and 24; 19.8% were from 25 to 44; 24.4% were from 45 to 64; and 26.3% were 65 years of age or older. The gender makeup of the city was 47.9% male and 52.1% female.

=== 2000 census ===
As of the census of 2000, there were 1,490 people, 650 households, and 391 families residing in the city. The population density was 624.0 inhabitants per square mile (240.9/km^{2}). There were 702 housing units at an average density of 294.0 per square mile (113.5/km^{2}). The racial makeup of the city was 98.79% White, 0.20% Native American, 0.60% Asian, 0.27% from other races, and 0.13% from two or more races. Hispanic or Latino of any race were 0.47% of the population.

There were 650 households, out of which 23.5% had children under the age of 18 living with them, 50.8% were married couples living together, 7.2% had a female householder with no husband present, and 39.7% were non-families. 37.4% of all households were made up of individuals, and 22.8% had someone living alone who was 65 years of age or older. The average household size was 2.18 and the average family size was 2.88.

23.4% were under the age of 18, 5.2% from 18 to 24, 22.3% from 25 to 44, 20.9% from 45 to 64, and 28.2% were 65 years of age or older. The median age was 44 years. For every 100 females, there were 83.0 males. For every 100 females age 18 and over, there were 80.5 males.

The median income for a household in the city was $32,083, and the median income for a family was $43,021. Males had a median income of $28,214 versus $19,432 for females. The per capita income for the city was $16,806. About 3.7% of families and 7.9% of the population were below the poverty line, including 5.4% of those under age 18 and 14.1% of those age 65 or over.

== Education ==
IKM–Manning Community School District operates public schools serving the community. It was in the Manning Community School District until it merged in to IKM-Manning on July 1, 2011.

Community colleges in the vicinity include Des Moines Area Community College Carroll Campus, Western Iowa Tech Community College (WITCC or WIT) Denison Campus, and Iowa Western Community College Shelby County Center and Cass County Center.

== Notable historical sporting accomplishments ==
The 1948 boys basketball team won the state of Iowa championship under Coach Bill Steneker. In a game reminiscent of the movie Hoosiers, the small town of Manning defeated the much larger urban school of Davenport by a score of 46–43. Team members were: Jim Farrell, Louis Bohsack, Richard Geith, Robert Koch, Merlin Rostermundt, Royce Rowedder, Danny Peters, Jerry Knaack, Leland Kienast, Willis Lohmeier, Leroy Kienast. The assistant Coach was Bill Andreson.

In 2002, the Manning High School football team won the State of Iowa Class A championship under coach Floyd Forman. Their season record was 12–1, and they won the final game against Fredericksburg (10–3) by a score of 52–0.
