= Melville Township, Audubon County, Iowa =

Township in Iowa, US

Melville Township, Audubon County
- Township
- Coordinates: 41°43′58″N 094°45′03″W
- Country: United States
- State: Iowa
- County: Audubon

Area
  - Total: 36.5 sq mi (94.6 km^{2})
  - Land: 36.5 sq mi (94.6 km^{2})
  - Water: 0 sq mi (0 km^{2})
- Elevation: 1,350 ft (410 m)

Population (2010)
  - Total: 117
  - Density: 3.1/sq mi (1.2/km^{2})
- FIPS code: 19-92910
- GNIS feature ID: 0468373

Melville Township is one of twelve townships in Audubon County, Iowa, United States. As of the 2010 census, its population was 117.

== History ==
Melville Township was organized in 1874.

== Geography ==
Melville Township covers an area of 36.5 square miles (94.6 km^{2}) and contains no incorporated settlements. According to the USGS, it contains one cemetery, Melville Township.
