= Center Township, Shelby County, Iowa =

Town in Iowa, United States

Center Township
- Township
- Interactive map of Center Township
- Coordinates: 41°39′N 95°16′W
- Country: United States
- State: Iowa
- County: Shelby

Area
  - Total: 33.7 sq mi (87 km^{2})

Population (2010)
  - Total: 468
  - Density: 13.9/sq mi (5.36/km^{2})
- Time zone: UTC-6 (CST)
  - Summer (DST): UTC-5 (CDT)

Center Township is a township in Shelby County, Iowa. Center Township has a population of 455 and an area of 33.7 square miles.
