= Cass Township, Shelby County, Iowa =

Township in Iowa, United States

Coordinates: 41.6501°N 95.49533°W

Cass Township is a township in Shelby County, Iowa. There are 370 people and 178 households in Cass Township. The total area is 36.1 square miles.
