= Douglas Township, Audubon County, Iowa =

Township in Iowa, US

Douglas Township, Audubon County
- Township
- Coordinates: 41°43′38″N 095°02′21″W
- Country: United States
- State: Iowa
- County: Audubon

Area
  - Total: 36.8 sq mi (95.4 km^{2})
  - Land: 36.8 sq mi (95.4 km^{2})
  - Water: 0 sq mi (0 km^{2})
- Elevation: 1,381 ft (421 m)

Population (2010)
  - Total: 210
  - Density: 5.7/sq mi (2.2/km^{2})
- FIPS code: 19-91026
- GNIS feature ID: 0467724

Douglas Township is one of twelve townships in Audubon County, Iowa, United States. As of the 2010 census, its population was 210.

== History ==
Douglas Township was organized in 1873.

== Geography ==
Douglas Township covers an area of 36.8 square miles (95.4 km^{2}) and contains no incorporated settlements. According to the USGS, it contains two cemeteries: Douglas Township and Ebenezer.
