= Douglas Township, Shelby County, Iowa =

Township in Shelby County, Iowa, U.S.

Coordinates: 41.7387°N 95.2651°W

Douglas Township is a township in Shelby County, Iowa. There are 133 people and 3.6 people per square mile in Douglas Township. The total area is 36.7 square miles.
