= Irwin, Iowa =

- City
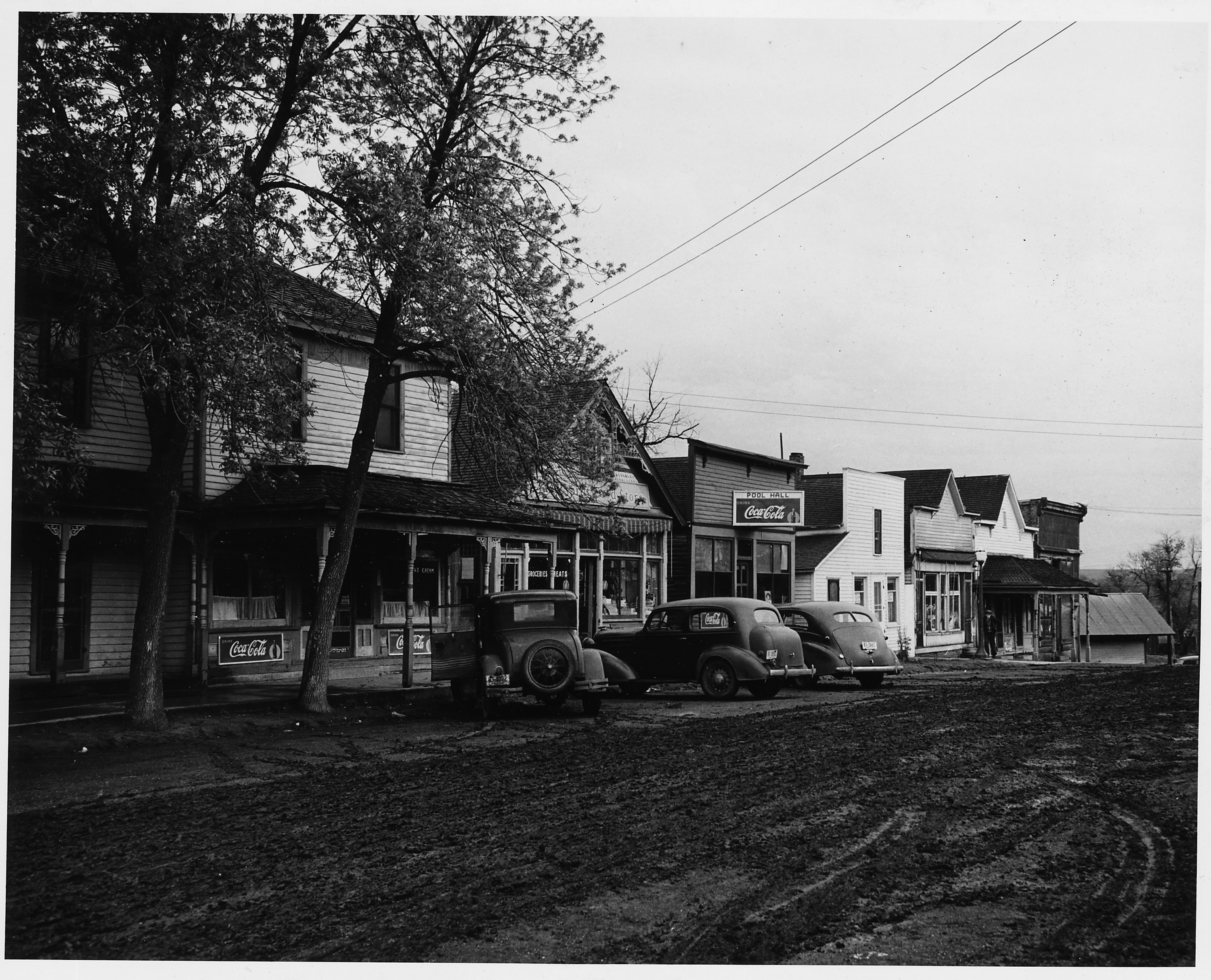
- Irwin in 1941

- Location of Irwin, Iowa
- Coordinates: 41°47′24″N 95°12′24″W
- Country: United States
- State: Iowa
- County: Shelby

Area
  - Total: 0.59 sq mi (1.52 km^{2})
  - Land: 0.59 sq mi (1.52 km^{2})
  - Water: 0 sq mi (0.00 km^{2})
- Elevation: 1,280 ft (390 m)

Population (2020)
  - Total: 319
  - Density: 545.0/sq mi (210.44/km^{2})
- Time zone: UTC-6 (Central (CST))
  - Summer (DST): UTC-5 (CDT)
- ZIP code: 51446
- Area code: 712
- FIPS code: 19-39000
- GNIS feature ID: 2395441
- Website: www.cityofirwinia.com

Irwin is a city in Shelby County, Iowa, United States, along the West Nishnabotna River. The population was 319 at the time of the 2020 census.

== History ==
The Western Town Lot Company established Irwin in 1881. The town was named for E. W. Irwin, the property owner. Irwin was incorporated in 1892.

In 1963, two United States Air Force B-47E bombers based at Schilling Air Force Base near Salina, Kansas, collided over western Iowa on August 19 and crashed several miles apart near Irwin. All six crewman ejected, but three were killed.

== Geography ==
According to the United States Census Bureau, the city has a total area of 0.60 square miles (1.55 km^{2}), all of it land.

== Demographics ==
Historical populations
Year	Pop.	±%
1900	295	—
1910	278	−5.8%
1920	311	+11.9%
1930	357	+14.8%
1940	345	−3.4%
1950	381	+10.4%
1960	425	+11.5%
1970	446	+4.9%
1980	427	−4.3%
1990	394	−7.7%
2000	372	−5.6%
2010	341	−8.3%
2020	319	−6.5%
Source:"U.S. Census website". United States Census Bureau. and Iowa Data Center; Source: U.S. Decennial Census

=== 2020 census ===
As of the census of 2020, there were 319 people, 159 households, and 101 families residing in the city. The population density was 545.0 inhabitants per square mile (210.4/km^{2}). There were 178 housing units at an average density of 304.1 per square mile (117.4/km^{2}). The racial makeup of the city was 94.4% White, 0.3% Black or African American, 0.3% Native American, 0.0% Asian, 0.0% Pacific Islander, 1.3% from other races and 3.8% from two or more races. Hispanic or Latino persons of any race comprised 3.1% of the population.

Of the 159 households, 26.4% of which had children under the age of 18 living with them, 44.7% were married couples living together, 8.8% were cohabitating couples, 23.9% had a female householder with no spouse or partner present and 22.6% had a male householder with no spouse or partner present. 36.5% of all households were non-families. 31.4% of all households were made up of individuals, 15.1% had someone living alone who was 65 years old or older.

The median age in the city was 50.8 years. 20.7% of the residents were under the age of 20; 5.0% were between the ages of 20 and 24; 16.0% were from 25 and 44; 29.8% were from 45 and 64; and 28.5% were 65 years of age or older. The gender makeup of the city was 52.4% male and 47.6% female.

=== 2010 census ===
As of the census of 2010, there were 341 people, 165 households, and 97 families residing in the city. The population density was 568.3 inhabitants per square mile (219.4/km^{2}). There were 185 housing units at an average density of 308.3 per square mile (119.0/km^{2}). The racial makeup of the city was 98.8% White, 0.6% from other races, and 0.6% from two or more races. Hispanic or Latino of any race were 1.2% of the population.

There were 165 households, of which 21.2% had children under the age of 18 living with them, 51.5% were married couples living together, 6.1% had a female householder with no husband present, 1.2% had a male householder with no wife present, and 41.2% were non-families. 37.6% of all households were made up of individuals, and 20% had someone living alone who was 65 years of age or older. The average household size was 2.07 and the average family size was 2.71.

The median age in the city was 52.3 years. 18.5% of residents were under the age of 18; 6.5% were between the ages of 18 and 24; 15.3% were from 25 to 44; 29.9% were from 45 to 64; and 29.9% were 65 years of age or older. The gender makeup of the city was 47.2% male and 52.8% female.

=== 2000 census ===
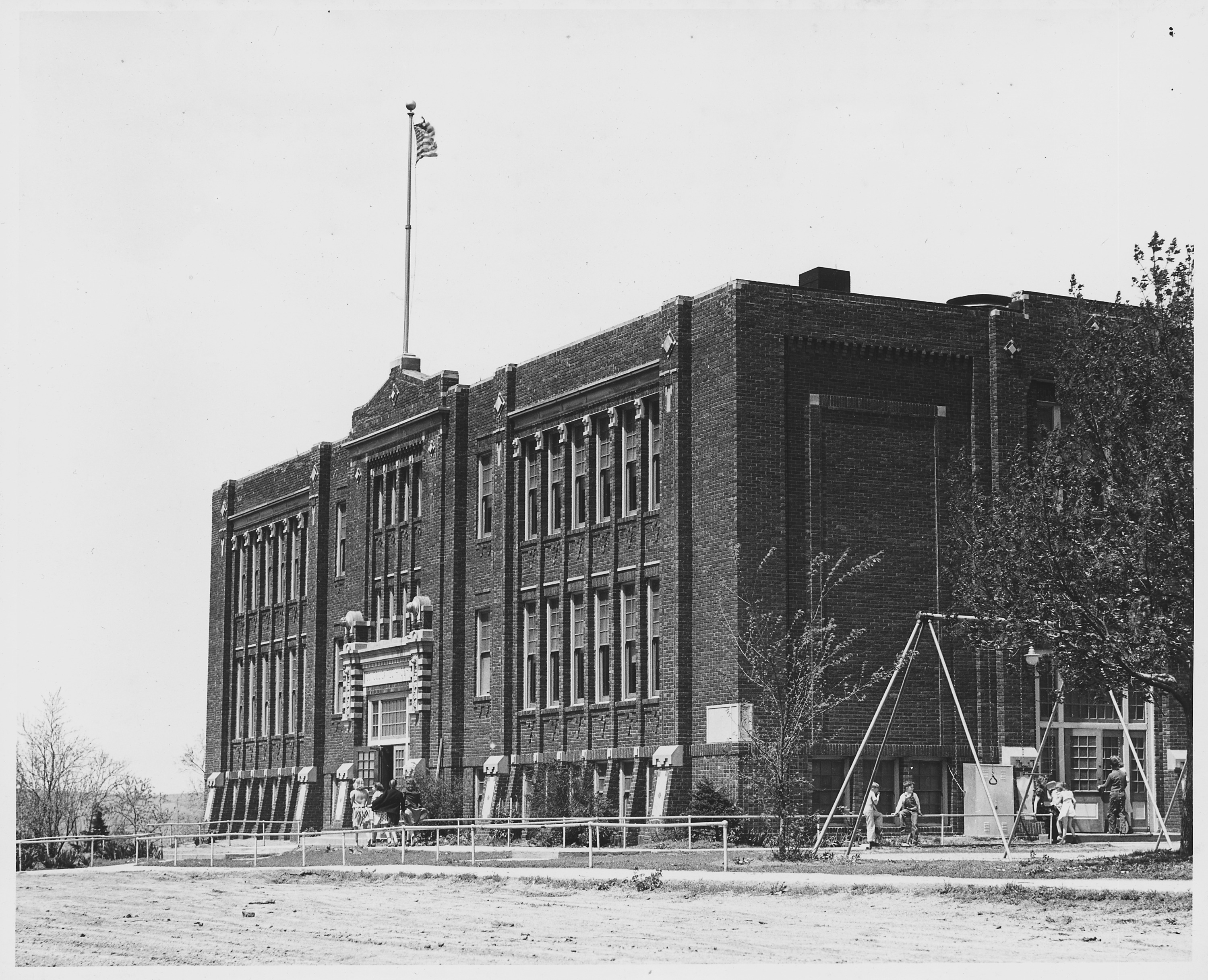
The Irwin Consolidated School is listed on the National Register of Historic Places

As of the census of 2000, there were 372 people, 168 households, and 110 families residing in the city. The population density was 624.4 inhabitants per square mile (241.1/km^{2}). There were 180 housing units at an average density of 302.1 per square mile (116.6/km^{2}). The racial makeup of the city was 98.92% White, 0.27% African American, 0.27% Native American, and 0.54% from two or more races. Hispanic or Latino of any race were 2.15% of the population.

There were 168 households, out of which 25.0% had children under the age of 18 living with them, 57.7% were married couples living together, 6.0% had a female householder with no husband present, and 34.5% were non-families. 32.1% of all households were made up of individuals, and 19.0% had someone living alone who was 65 years of age or older. The average household size was 2.21 and the average family size was 2.76.

In the city, the population was spread out, with 21.2% under the age of 18, 6.2% from 18 to 24, 22.6% from 25 to 44, 24.2% from 45 to 64, and 25.8% who were 65 years of age or older. The median age was 45 years. For every 100 females, there were 90.8 males. For every 100 females age 18 and over, there were 91.5 males.

The median income for a household in the city was $30,417, and the median income for a family was $40,000. Males had a median income of $28,000 versus $18,393 for females. The per capita income for the city was $15,429. About 7.4% of families and 9.8% of the population were below the poverty line, including 9.8% of those under age 18 and 13.5% of those age 65 or over.

== Education ==
Irwin is served by the IKM–Manning Community School District.

It was previously in the Irwin Community School District until July 1, 1992, when it merged into the IKM Community School District. That in turn, on July 1, 2011, merged into IKM–Manning.
