= Shelby County, Iowa =

County in Iowa, United States

- County
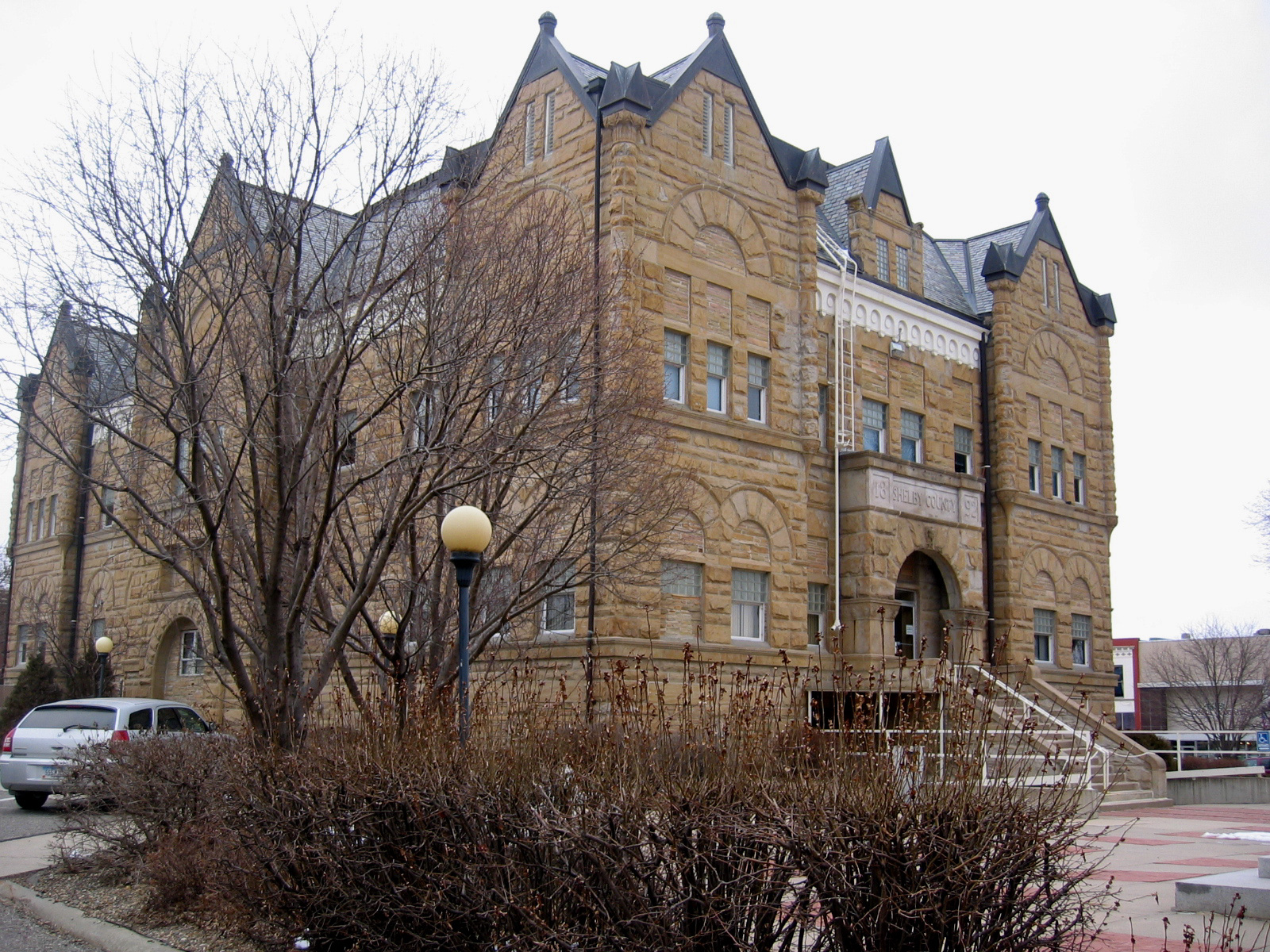
- The Shelby County Courthouse in Harlan

- Location within the U.S. state of Iowa
- Coordinates: 41°40′53″N 95°18′46″W
- Country: United States
- State: Iowa
- Founded: January 15, 1851
- Named for: Isaac Shelby
- Seat: Harlan
- Largest city: Harlan

Area
  - Total: 598 sq mi (1,550 km^{2})
  - Land: 598 sq mi (1,550 km^{2})
  - Water: 0.6 sq mi (1.6 km^{2}) 0.1%

Population (2020)
  - Total: 11,746
  - Estimate (2025): 11,689 ▼
  - Density: 19.6/sq mi (7.58/km^{2})
- Time zone: UTC−6 (Central)
  - Summer (DST): UTC−5 (CDT)
- Congressional district: 4th
- Website: shelbycounty.iowa.gov
- Iowa county number 83

Shelby County is a county located in the U.S. state of Iowa. As of the 2020 census, the population was 11,746. The county seat and the largest city is Harlan. Its name is in honor of Isaac Shelby, the first Governor of Kentucky.

== History ==
Shelby County was established on January 15, 1851. It was named after General Isaac Shelby, a hero in the American Revolutionary War and the first Governor of Kentucky.

Early settlement in Shelby County began in 1848 in Galand's Grove. On February 4, 1855, Shelbyville was designated as the county seat. In April 1859, the county seat was moved to Harlan. One year later, the first courthouse was erected, and a second courthouse was constructed in 1875. In 1892, construction of the present courthouse began, this time using stone and building it three stories high. Construction was completed in 1893, with the dedication on September 14. The 1892 Shelby County Courthouse and the surrounding buildings were listed on the National Register of Historic Places on September 23, 1994. In 1978, the building was extensively restored and continues to serve as the courthouse.

Starting in the 1870s, many Danish immigrants came to settle in Elk Horn in the southeastern portion of the county, and in Kimballton in adjoining Audubon County. More people with Danish ancestry live in this area today than any other rural community aside from Denmark itself.

== Geography ==
According to the United States Census Bureau, the county has a total area of 591 square miles (1,530 km^{2}), of which 591 square miles (1,530 km^{2}) is land and 0.6 square miles (1.6 km^{2}) (0.1%) is water.

=== Major highways ===
- U.S. Highway 59
- Iowa Highway 37
- Iowa Highway 44
- Iowa Highway 173
- Iowa Highway 191
- County Highway M16
- County Highway F58
- County Highway F32
- County Highway F24
- County Highway M36

=== Attractions ===
- Shelby County Speedway

=== Adjacent counties ===
- Crawford County (north)
- Audubon County (east)
- Cass County (southeast)
- Pottawattamie County (south)
- Harrison County (west)

== Demographics ==
Historical population
Census	Pop.	Note	%±
1860	818		—
1870	2,540		210.5%
1880	12,696		399.8%
1890	17,611		38.7%
1900	17,932		1.8%
1910	16,552		−7.7%
1920	16,065		−2.9%
1930	17,131		6.6%
1940	16,720		−2.4%
1950	15,942		−4.7%
1960	15,825		−0.7%
1970	15,528		−1.9%
1980	15,043		−3.1%
1990	13,230		−12.1%
2000	13,173		−0.4%
2010	12,167		−7.6%
2020	11,746		−3.5%
2025 (est.)	11,689	▼	−0.5%
U.S. Decennial Census; 1790–1960 1900–1990; 1990–2000 2010–2020

=== 2020 census ===
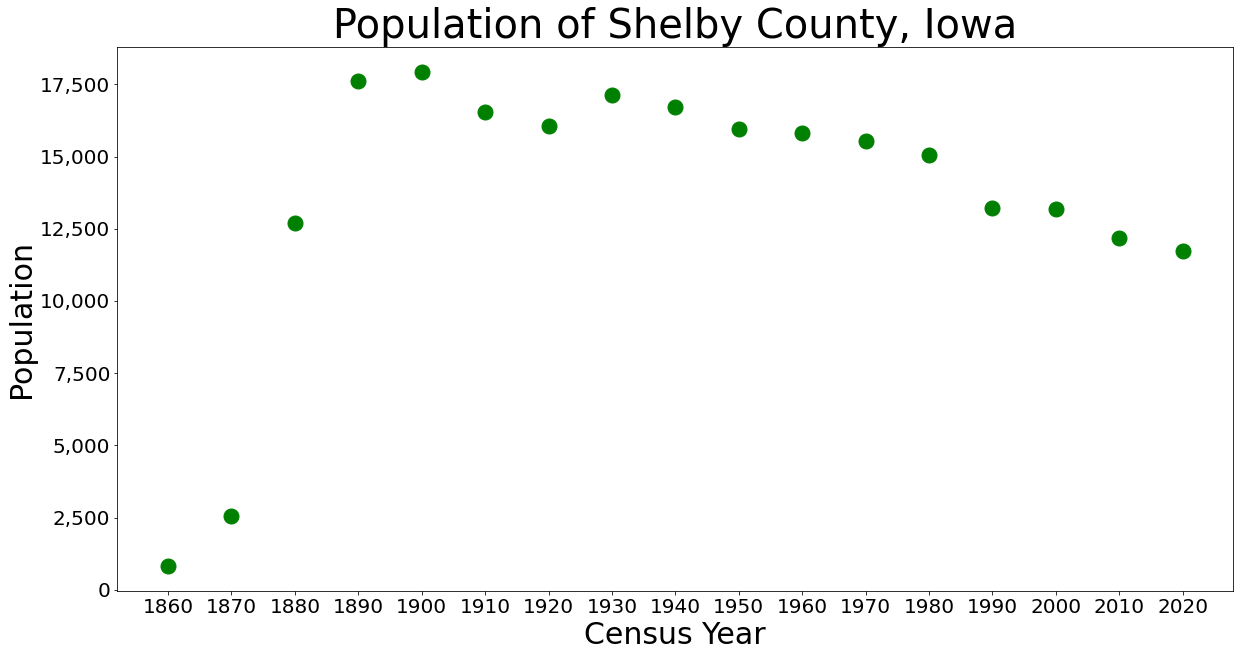
Population of Shelby County from the U.S. census data

As of the 2020 census, the county had a population of 11,746 and a population density of 19.6/sq mi (7.6/km^{2}). 96.51% of the population reported being of one race. The racial makeup of the county was 93.6% White (including 90.06% non-Hispanic White), 0.5% Black or African American, 0.5% American Indian and Alaska Native, 0.4% Asian, <0.1% Native Hawaiian or Pacific Islander, 1.6% some other race, and 3.5% from two or more races; Hispanic or Latino residents of any race comprised 3.5% of the population. Combined, 5.07% were some other race or more than one race.

The median age was 46.4 years. 22.5% of residents were under the age of 18 and 23.4% of residents were 65 years of age or older. For every 100 females there were 99.2 males, and for every 100 females age 18 and over there were 96.9 males age 18 and over.

40.1% of residents lived in urban areas, while 59.9% lived in rural areas.

There were 4,981 households in the county, of which 26.7% had children under the age of 18 living in them. Of all households, 52.7% were married-couple households, 18.9% were households with a male householder and no spouse or partner present, and 22.8% were households with a female householder and no spouse or partner present. About 30.4% of all households were made up of individuals and 16.0% had someone living alone who was 65 years of age or older. There were 5,421 housing units, of which 4,981 were occupied, yielding an 8.1% vacancy rate; 77.2% of occupied housing units were owner-occupied and 22.8% were renter-occupied, the homeowner vacancy rate was 1.7% and the rental vacancy rate was 9.1%.

=== 2010 census ===
The 2010 census recorded a population of 12,167 in the county, with a population density of 20.6/sq mi (8.0/km^{2}). There were 5,542 housing units, of which 5,085 were occupied.

=== 2000 census ===
As of the census of 2000, there were 13,173 people, 5,173 households, and 3,703 families residing in the county. The population density was 22 people per square mile (8.5 people/km^{2}). There were 5,459 housing units at an average density of 9 per square mile (3.5/km^{2}). The racial makeup of the county was 98.68% White, 0.10% Black or African American, 0.29% Native American, 0.27% Asian, 0.18% from other races, and 0.48% from two or more races. 0.67% of the population were Hispanic or Latino of any race.

There were 5,173 households, out of which 32.60% had children under the age of 18 living with them, 62.30% were married couples living together, 6.80% had a female householder with no husband present, and 28.40% were non-families. 25.20% of all households were made up of individuals, and 13.60% had someone living alone who was 65 years of age or older. The average household size was 2.49 and the average family size was 2.99.

In the county, the population was spread out, with 26.40% under the age of 18, 5.70% from 18 to 24, 25.20% from 25 to 44, 22.40% from 45 to 64, and 20.40% who were 65 years of age or older. The median age was 40 years. For every 100 females there were 95.90 males. For every 100 females age 18 and over, there were 93.30 males.

The median income for a household in the county was $37,442, and the median income for a family was $44,681. Males had a median income of $29,402 versus $20,296 for females. The per capita income for the county was $16,969. About 4.30% of families and 6.00% of the population were below the poverty line, including 6.00% of those under age 18 and 7.60% of those age 65 or over.

== Communities ==
=== Cities ===
- Defiance
- Earling
- Elk Horn
- Harlan
- Irwin
- Kirkman
- Panama
- Portsmouth
- Shelby
- Tennant
- Westphalia

=== Census-designated places ===
- Corley
- Jacksonville

=== Other unincorporated places ===
- Botna
- Red Line
- Manteno

=== Townships ===
- Cass Township
- Center Township
- Clay Township
- Douglas Township
- Fairview Township
- Greeley Township
- Grove Township
- Jackson Township
- Jefferson Township
- Lincoln Township
- Monroe Township
- Polk Township
- Shelby Township
- Union Township
- Washington Township
- Westphalia Township

=== Population ranking ===
The population ranking of the following table is based on the 2020 census of Shelby County.

† county seat

Rank	City/Town/etc.	Municipal type	Population (2020 Census)
1	† Harlan	City	4,893
2	Shelby (partially in Pottawattamie County)	City	716 (727 total)
3	Elk Horn	City	601
4	Earling	City	397
5	Irwin	City	319
6	Defiance	City	245
7	Panama	City	235
8	Portsmouth	City	182
9	Westphalia	City	126
10	Tennant	City	78
11	Kirkman	City	56
12	Corley	CDP	31
13	Jacksonville	CDP	29

== Politics ==
United States presidential election results for Shelby County, Iowa
Year	Republican		Democratic		Third party(ies)	
Year	No.	%	No.	%	No.	%
1896	2,019	47.85%	2,175	51.55%	25	0.59%
1900	2,182	51.47%	2,010	47.42%	47	1.11%
1904	2,310	57.69%	1,584	39.56%	110	2.75%
1908	1,973	49.34%	1,935	48.39%	91	2.28%
1912	872	22.63%	1,841	47.78%	1,140	29.59%
1916	1,898	47.50%	2,060	51.55%	38	0.95%
1920	4,621	70.55%	1,882	28.73%	47	0.72%
1924	3,252	47.96%	2,297	33.88%	1,231	18.16%
1928	3,459	48.85%	3,604	50.90%	18	0.25%
1932	2,478	32.86%	4,940	65.52%	122	1.62%
1936	3,490	42.40%	4,264	51.80%	477	5.80%
1940	4,613	54.53%	3,811	45.05%	36	0.43%
1944	3,873	55.86%	2,978	42.95%	82	1.18%
1948	3,301	47.60%	3,499	50.45%	135	1.95%
1952	5,135	64.68%	2,762	34.79%	42	0.53%
1956	4,425	56.78%	3,300	42.35%	68	0.87%
1960	4,210	55.08%	3,427	44.83%	7	0.09%
1964	2,928	41.03%	4,148	58.12%	61	0.85%
1968	3,886	58.65%	2,365	35.69%	375	5.66%
1972	4,052	62.93%	2,259	35.08%	128	1.99%
1976	3,301	52.72%	2,851	45.54%	109	1.74%
1980	4,147	64.03%	1,892	29.21%	438	6.76%
1984	4,200	64.25%	2,291	35.05%	46	0.70%
1988	3,019	51.52%	2,806	47.88%	35	0.60%
1992	2,809	42.92%	2,094	32.00%	1,641	25.08%
1996	3,056	51.44%	2,176	36.63%	709	11.93%
2000	3,655	60.83%	2,179	36.26%	175	2.91%
2004	4,256	63.81%	2,355	35.31%	59	0.88%
2008	3,488	54.04%	2,863	44.35%	104	1.61%
2012	3,911	60.33%	2,469	38.08%	103	1.59%
2016	4,362	68.48%	1,662	26.09%	346	5.43%
2020	4,697	69.12%	1,959	28.83%	139	2.05%
2024	4,600	70.71%	1,811	27.84%	94	1.45%

== See also ==
- Shelby County Courthouse
- National Register of Historic Places listings in Shelby County, Iowa
