= National Register of Historic Places listings in Shelby County, Iowa =

Location of Shelby County in Iowa

This is a list of the National Register of Historic Places listings in Shelby County, Iowa.

This is intended to be a complete list of the properties and districts on the National Register of Historic Places in Shelby County, Iowa, United States. Latitude and longitude coordinates are provided for many National Register properties and districts; these locations may be seen together in a map.

There are 13 properties and districts listed on the National Register in the county.

This National Park Service list is complete through NPS recent listings posted September 19, 2025.

	Name on the Register	Image	Date listed	Location	City or town	Description
1	Chicago, Rock Island and Pacific Railroad Stone Arch Viaduct	Chicago, Rock Island and Pacific Railroad Stone Arch Viaduct	July 15, 1998 (#98000870)	0.5 miles northwest of the junction of St. F66 and Hackberry Rd. 41°31′26″N 95°26′11″W	Shelby	
2	Jens Otto Christiansen House		January 16, 1997 (#96001584)	2105 College Ave. 41°35′38″N 95°03′37″W	Elk Horn	
3	Floral Hall	Floral Hall	April 11, 1985 (#85000765)	314 4th St. on Shelby County Fairgrounds; 41°39′53″N 95°18′48″W	Harlan	
4	Harlan Courthouse Square Commercial District	Harlan Courthouse Square Commercial District	September 23, 1994 (#94001099)	Market, 6th, 7th, and Court Sts., around Courthouse Sq. 41°39′30″N 95°19′04″W	Harlan	
5	Irwin Consolidated School	Irwin Consolidated School	October 24, 2002 (#02001246)	North St. 41°47′41″N 95°12′21″W	Irwin	
6	Chris Larsen House		October 3, 1991 (#91001456)	4215 Main St. 41°35′33″N 95°03′34″W	Elk Horn	
7	Pleasant View Stock Farm Historic District		July 3, 2019 (#100004112)	1933-1935 Road M36; 41°47′15″N 95°16′02″W	Irwin vicinity	
8	Chris Poldberg Farmstead		October 3, 1991 (#91001459)	0.5 miles south of Iowa Highway 44 on Wolf Creek; 41°37′28″N 95°07′54″W	Jacksonville	
9	George Rewerts House	George Rewerts House	October 3, 1991 (#91001450)	306 8th Ave. 41°49′45″N 95°20′33″W	Defiance	
10	Saint Boniface Catholic Church District	Saint Boniface Catholic Church District	October 3, 1991 (#91001449)	Three blocks north of County Road F32; 41°43′17″N 95°23′44″W	Westphalia	
11	St. Paul's Episcopal Church	St. Paul's Episcopal Church	September 1, 1978 (#78001259)	712 Farnham St. 41°39′16″N 95°19′04″W	Harlan	
12	Shelby Consolidated School	Shelby Consolidated School	February 5, 2014 (#13001139)	304 Western Ave. 41°31′00″N 95°27′31″W	Shelby	
13	Shelby County Courthouse	Shelby County Courthouse	November 14, 1978 (#78001258)	7th and Court Sts. 41°39′23″N 95°19′09″W	Harlan	

== Former listings ==
	Name on the Register	Image	Date listed	Date removed	Location	City or town	Description
1	J.C. Heese Lumber Shed		October 3, 1991 (#91001454)	November 12, 1997	Railway St., E side	Earling	Demolished in 1996

== See also ==
- List of National Historic Landmarks in Iowa
- National Register of Historic Places listings in Iowa
- Listings in neighboring counties: Audubon, Cass, Crawford, Harrison, Pottawattamie
