= Floral Hall =

Floral Hall can refer to:

In the United Kingdom

- Paul Hamlyn Hall, the former Covent Garden floral hall in London
- Floral Hall, Hornsea, events venue in the East Riding of Yorkshire
- Floral Hall, Scarborough, demolished theatre in North Yorkshire
- Floral Hall, a former events venue in the grounds of Belfast Zoo.

In the United States

- Floral Hall (Harlan, Iowa), listed on the NRHP in Iowa
- Floral Hall (Tipton, Iowa), listed on the NRHP in Iowa
- Floral Hall (Portland, Indiana), listed on the NRHP in Indiana
- Floral Hall (Lexington, Kentucky), listed on the NRHP in Kentucky
- Floral Hall (Bowling Green, Ohio), listed on the NRHP in Ohio
- Floral Hall (Mount Gilead, Ohio), listed on the NRHP in Ohio
- Floral Hall (Everett, Washington), listed on the NRHP in Washington
