= Floral (disambiguation) =

To be floral is to pertain to flowers.

Floral may also refer to:

- Floral, Arkansas, an unincorporated community in the United States
- Floral, Kansas, an unincorporated community in the United States
- Floral, Saskatchewan, an unincorporated community in Canada
- Floral Street, London, England

== See also ==
- Flora (disambiguation)
- Floral Hall (disambiguation)
