= Fort Custer Maze =

Defunct tourist attraction

Coordinates: 43.1373°N 93.3564°W

Fort Custer Maze

The Fort Custer Maze was a 2-mile (3.2 km) long maze enclosed within an 1850s western style fort located in Clear Lake, Iowa. It closed in October 2015 after being in operation for 15 years.

== Design ==
Portsmouth resident and maze book compiler Adrienne Fisher was the maze's designer. The owner was Jack Kennedy, who wanted to have an original name for the fort, but he found out later that there was already a Fort Custer Training Center for National Guards. It was built with more than 250,000 feet (76,000 m) of wood pallets. The maze was spread over close to two acres with paths totalling nearly two miles in length. To show visitors out of the maze if they had trouble, there was a lookout tower and stations. It took 90 minutes on average to clear the maze, but some visitors could complete it within 30 to 45 minutes.

The maze had a different design each week. It included pictures of Doc Holliday and of stuffed bears. The maze also had an inflatable bouncer for children to play on. During Halloween, there was a haunted maze, and during the summer, weekly prizes for participating in a competition within the maze.

A visit to the maze was positively reviewed by Roadside America, and although its writer Kara S. McCoy did not recommend the maze for children, it was recommended by Family's Day Out as a place for children.

== Closure ==
The near-91-year-old owner Kennedy stated that he maintained the maze "for more than 1,000 hours every summer" and that "it’s time to stop". He said, "I've been very happy, happy every hour I've spent here". It was in operation until late October 2015.
