= Earling, Iowa =

- City
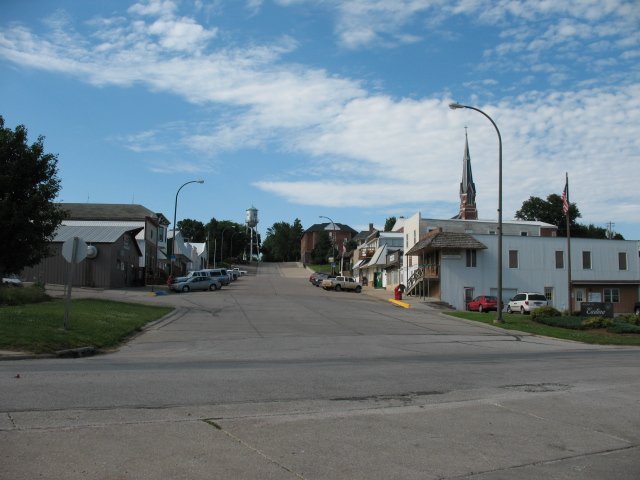
- View of Earling main street looking north

- Location of Earling, Iowa
- Coordinates: 41°46′35″N 95°25′08″W
- Country: United States
- State: Iowa
- County: Shelby

Area
  - Total: 0.63 sq mi (1.63 km^{2})
  - Land: 0.63 sq mi (1.63 km^{2})
  - Water: 0 sq mi (0.00 km^{2})
- Elevation: 1,355 ft (413 m)

Population (2020)
  - Total: 397
  - Density: 629.3/sq mi (242.97/km^{2})
- Time zone: UTC-6 (Central (CST))
  - Summer (DST): UTC-5 (CDT)
- ZIP code: 51530
- Area code: 712
- FIPS code: 19-23385
- GNIS feature ID: 2394591

Earling is a city in Shelby County, Iowa, United States. The population was 397 at the time of the 2020 census.

== History ==
Earling had its start 1881-1882 by the building of the Chicago, Milwaukee and St. Paul Railway through that territory.

The town was platted in 1882 by the Milwaukee Land Company and was first known as Marthan. However, there was already a town called Marathon in Iowa, so the name of the town was soon changed to Earling, in honor of Albert J. Earling who in 1882 was division superintendent of the Chicago, Milwaukee and St. Paul Railway. (Earling became president of said Railroad on September 23, 1899.)

Earling is well known in paranormal circles for being the site of the 1928 exorcism of Anna Ecklund. Over 23 days in 1928, a Roman Catholic Capuchin named Theophilus Riesinger worked to exorcise demons from Emma Schmidt at the local Franciscan convent. One of the priests involved wrote an account several years later in which he made a variety of supernatural claims, including that Ecklund flew threw the air during the exorcism and clung to the wall over a door, that locals noticed strange noises and odors, and that the 23 day exorcism resulted in the expulsion of several demons from Ecklund.

== Geography ==
According to the United States Census Bureau, the city has a total area of 0.60 square miles (1.55 km^{2}), all of it land. The city straddles the boundary line between southeast Union Township and northeast Westphalia Township.

Mosquito Creek rises near Earling.

== Demographics ==
Historical populations
| Year | Pop. | ±% |
|---|---|---|
| 1900 | 340 | — |
| 1910 | 323 | −5.0% |
| 1920 | 321 | −0.6% |
| 1930 | 358 | +11.5% |
| 1940 | 320 | −10.6% |
| 1950 | 341 | +6.6% |
| 1960 | 431 | +26.4% |
| 1970 | 573 | +32.9% |
| 1980 | 520 | −9.2% |
| 1990 | 466 | −10.4% |
| 2000 | 471 | +1.1% |
| 2010 | 437 | −7.2% |
| 2020 | 397 | −9.2% |
Source:"U.S. Census website". United States Census Bureau. and Iowa Data Center; Source: U.S. Decennial Census

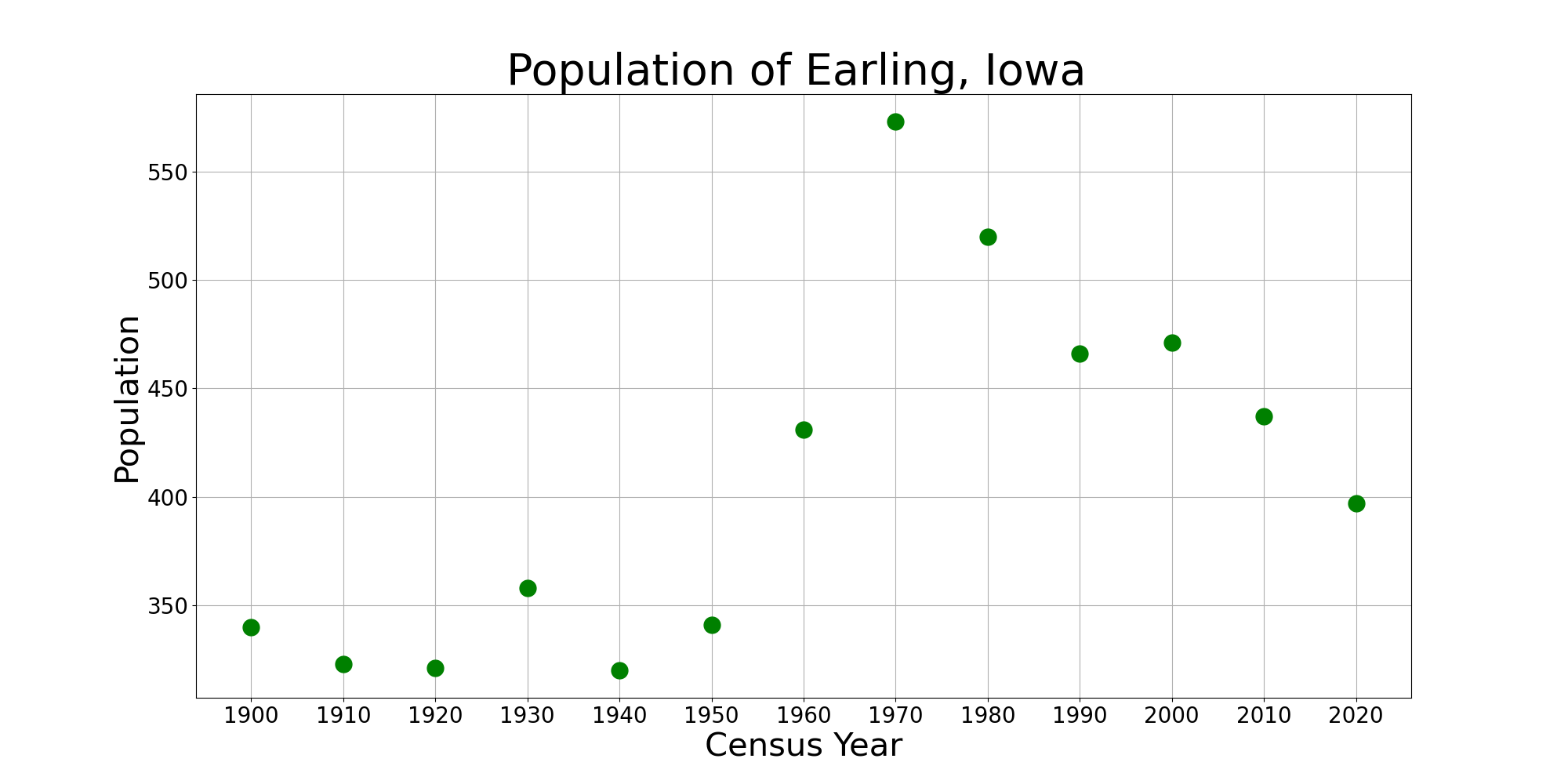
The population of Earling, Iowa from US census data

=== 2020 census ===
As of the census of 2020, there were 397 people, 176 households, and 105 families residing in the city. The population density was 629.3 inhabitants per square mile (243.0/km^{2}). There were 186 housing units at an average density of 294.8 per square mile (113.8/km^{2}). The racial makeup of the city was 95.5% White, 0.0% Black or African American, 0.8% Native American, 0.0% Asian, 0.0% Pacific Islander, 0.0% from other races and 3.8% from two or more races. Hispanic or Latino persons of any race comprised 1.8% of the population.

Of the 176 households, 33.0% of which had children under the age of 18 living with them, 46.0% were married couples living together, 5.1% were cohabitating couples, 26.7% had a female householder with no spouse or partner present and 22.2% had a male householder with no spouse or partner present. 40.3% of all households were non-families. 38.1% of all households were made up of individuals, 22.7% had someone living alone who was 65 years old or older.

The median age in the city was 41.6 years. 25.4% of the residents were under the age of 20; 6.5% were between the ages of 20 and 24; 21.9% were from 25 and 44; 25.4% were from 45 and 64; and 20.7% were 65 years of age or older. The gender makeup of the city was 50.1% male and 49.9% female.

=== 2010 census ===
As of the census of 2010, there were 437 people, 175 households, and 102 families residing in the city. The population density was 728.3 inhabitants per square mile (281.2/km^{2}). There were 185 housing units at an average density of 308.3 per square mile (119.0/km^{2}). The racial makeup of the city was 97.9% White, 0.2% African American, 1.4% Native American, and 0.5% from two or more races. Hispanic or Latino of any race were 1.1% of the population.

There were 175 households, of which 24.6% had children under the age of 18 living with them, 46.3% were married couples living together, 9.7% had a female householder with no husband present, 2.3% had a male householder with no wife present, and 41.7% were non-families. 36.6% of all households were made up of individuals, and 21.2% had someone living alone who was 65 years of age or older. The average household size was 2.22 and the average family size was 2.89.

The median age in the city was 50.1 years. 21.1% of residents were under the age of 18; 5% were between the ages of 18 and 24; 18.5% were from 25 to 44; 23.1% were from 45 to 64; and 32.3% were 65 years of age or older. The gender makeup of the city was 50.3% male and 49.7% female.

=== 2000 census ===
As of the census of 2000, there were 471 people, 181 households, and 114 families residing in the city. The population density was 772.3 inhabitants per square mile (298.2/km^{2}). There were 186 housing units at an average density of 305.0 per square mile (117.8/km^{2}). The racial makeup of the city was 99.36% White, 0.21% Native American, and 0.42% from two or more races.

There were 181 households, out of which 23.2% had children under the age of 18 living with them, 51.4% were married couples living together, 8.8% had a female householder with no husband present, and 36.5% were non-families. 30.4% of all households were made up of individuals, and 18.8% had someone living alone who was 65 years of age or older. The average household size was 2.29 and the average family size was 2.86.

In the city, the population was spread out, with 19.5% under the age of 18, 7.2% from 18 to 24, 21.9% from 25 to 44, 15.5% from 45 to 64, and 35.9% who were 65 years of age or older. The median age was 46 years. For every 100 females, there were 90.7 males. For every 100 females age 18 and over, there were 87.6 males.

The median income for a household in the city was $29,702, and the median income for a family was $40,417. Males had a median income of $25,417 versus $21,250 for females. The per capita income for the city was $15,866. About 5.9% of families and 7.5% of the population were below the poverty line, including 7.7% of those under age 18 and 13.8% of those age 65 or over.

== Education ==
The Harlan Community School District operates local public schools. The district serves the towns of Harlan, Defiance, Earling, Panama, Portsmouth and Westphalia, the unincorporated communities of Jacksonville and Corley, and the surrounding rural areas.
