= Corley, Iowa =

- Census-designated place
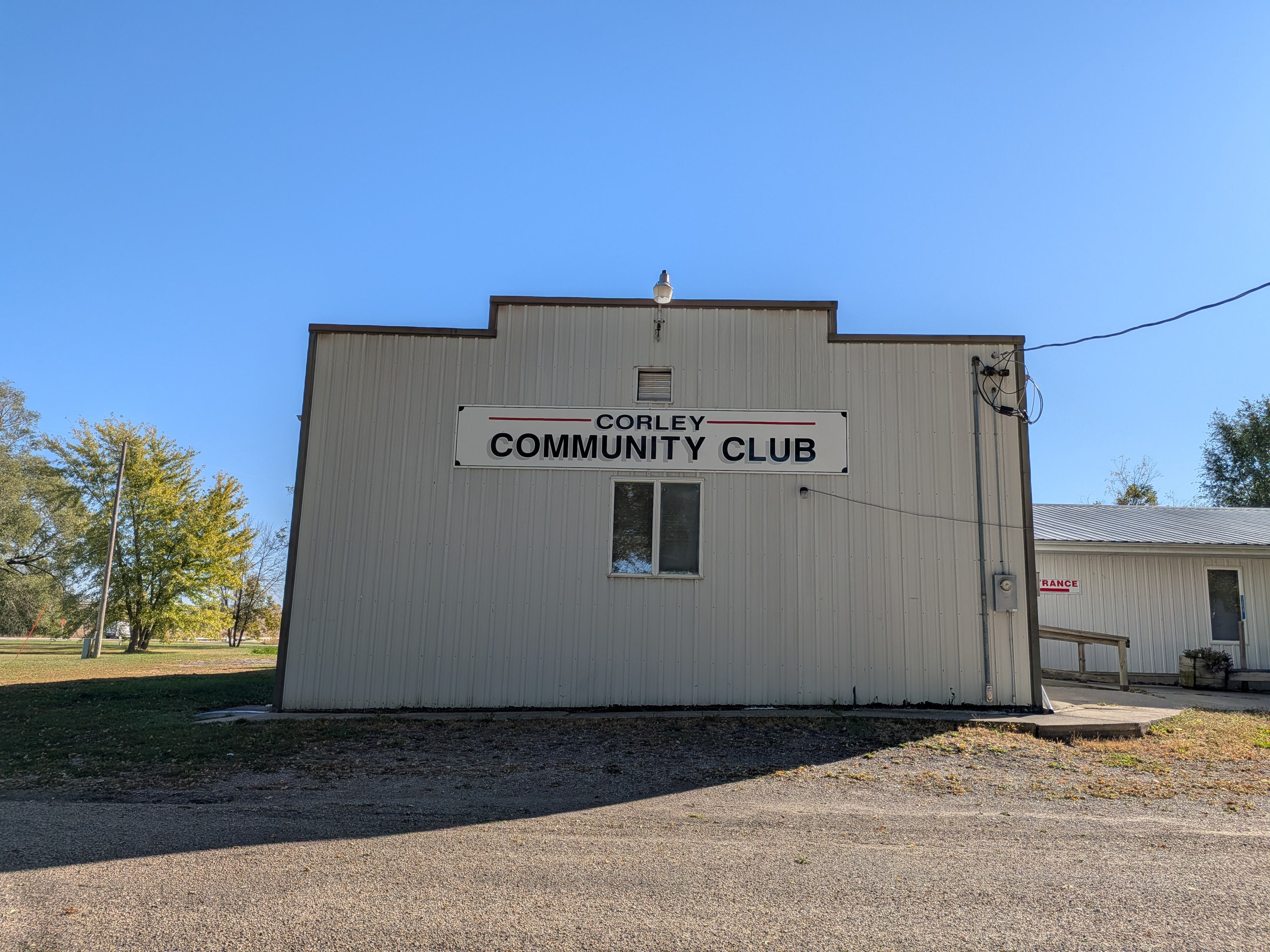
- Corley Community Club

- Location within Iowa
- Coordinates: 41°34′40″N 95°19′50″W
- Country: United States
- State: Iowa
- County: Shelby

Area
  - Total: 0.058 sq mi (0.15 km^{2})
  - Land: 0.058 sq mi (0.15 km^{2})
  - Water: 0 sq mi (0.00 km^{2})
- Elevation: 1,178 ft (359 m)

Population (2020)
  - Total: 31
  - Density: 518.9/sq mi (200.34/km^{2})
- Time zone: UTC-6 (Central (CST))
  - Summer (DST): UTC-5 (CDT)
- ZIP code: 51537
- Area code: 712
- GNIS feature ID: 2583482

Corley is an unincorporated community and census-designated place (CDP) in Shelby County, Iowa, in the United States. As of the 2020 Census the population of Corley was 31.

== History ==
Corley was founded in 1878. Corley's population was 75 in 1902, and 90 in 1925. The population was 75 in 1940.

== Location ==
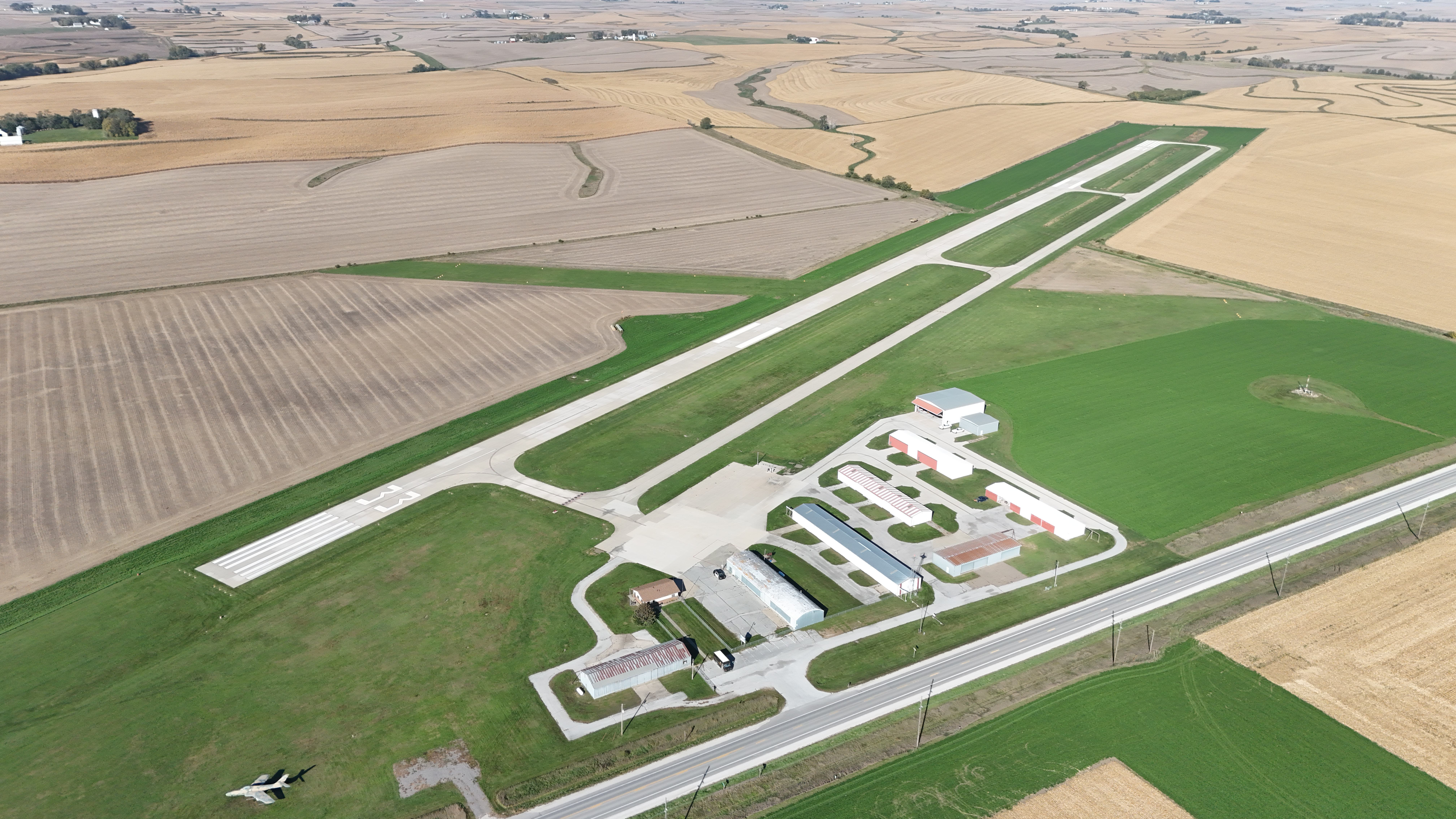
The Harlan Municipal Airport, near Corley

Corley is located 1/7th of a mile from the West Nishnabotna River and is 1/4 of a mile from the Harlan Municipal Airport. Corley is located between Harlan and Avoca. It is one of the two Census designated places in Shelby County along with Jacksonville a few miles up the road.

== Education ==
The Harlan Community School District operates local public schools. The district serves the towns of Harlan, Defiance, Earling, Panama, Portsmouth and Westphalia, the unincorporated communities of Jacksonville and Corley, and the surrounding rural areas.

== Demographics ==
Historical population
Census	Pop.	Note	%±
2010	26		—
2020	31		19.2%
U.S. Decennial Census

=== 2020 census ===
As of the census of 2020, there were 31 people, 15 households, and 13 families residing in the community. The population density was 518.9 inhabitants per square mile (200.3/km^{2}). There were 16 housing units at an average density of 267.8 per square mile (103.4/km^{2}). The racial makeup of the community was 96.8% White, 0.0% Black or African American, 0.0% Native American, 0.0% Asian, 0.0% Pacific Islander, 0.0% from other races and 3.2% from two or more races. Hispanic or Latino persons of any race comprised 6.5% of the population.

Of the 15 households, 6.7% of which had children under the age of 18 living with them, 73.3% were married couples living together, 6.7% were cohabitating couples, 13.3% had a female householder with no spouse or partner present and 6.7% had a male householder with no spouse or partner present. 13.3% of all households were non-families. 13.3% of all households were made up of individuals, 6.7% had someone living alone who was 65 years old or older.

The median age in the community was 64.5 years. 12.9% of the residents were under the age of 20; 0.0% were between the ages of 20 and 24; 6.5% were from 25 and 44; 38.7% were from 45 and 64; and 41.9% were 65 years of age or older. The gender makeup of the community was 54.8% male and 45.2% female.
