= Harlan Courthouse Square Commercial District =

Historic district in Iowa, United States

- U.S. National Register of Historic Places
- U.S. Historic district
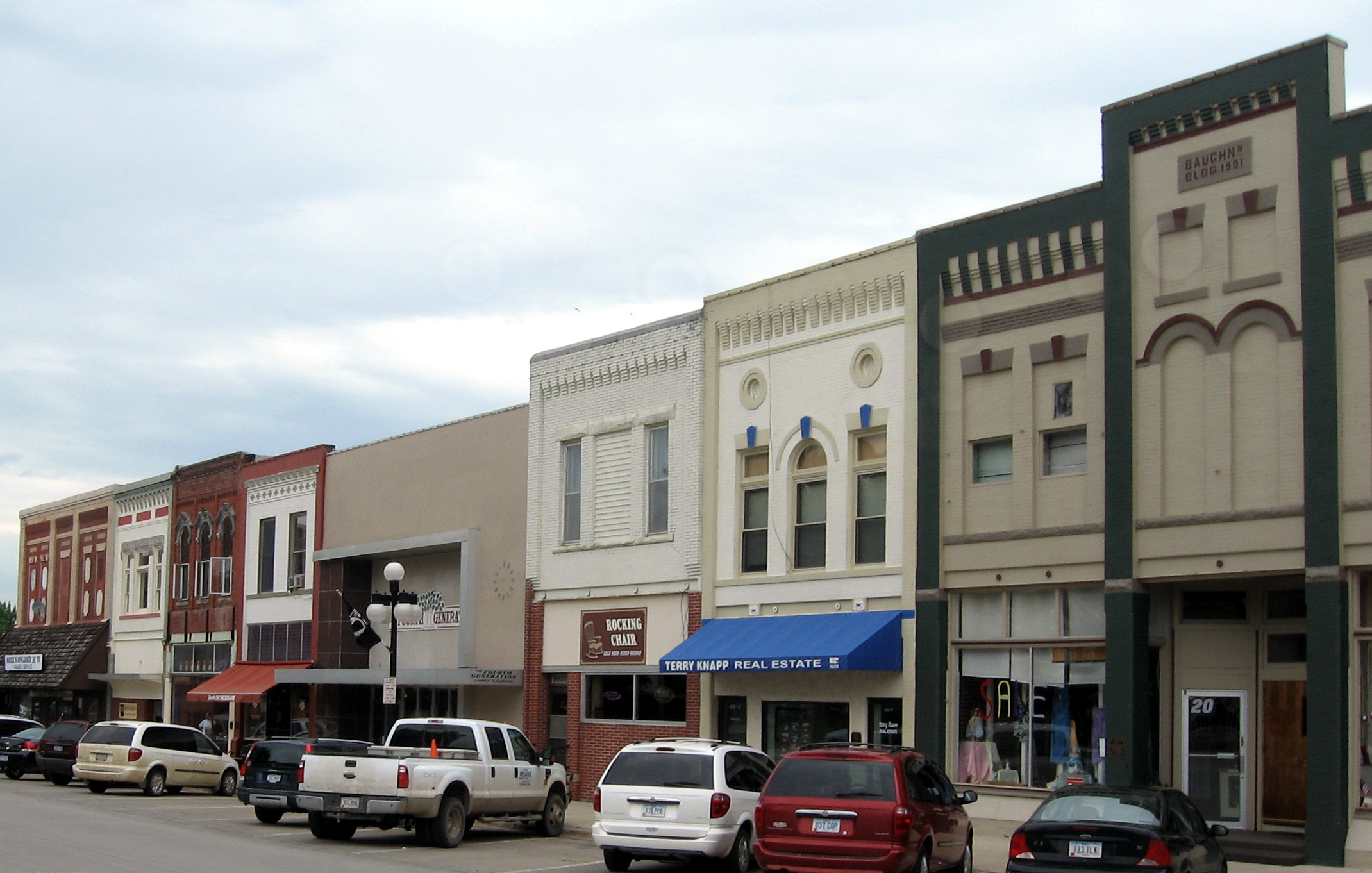

- Location within Iowa Location within the United States
- Interactive map showing the location for Harlan Courthouse Swuare Historic District
- Location: Market, 6th, 7th, and Court Sts., around Courthouse Sq. Harlan, Iowa
- Coordinates: 41°39′30″N 95°19′04″W
- Area: 6.8 acres (2.8 ha)
- Built: 1882
- Architect: C.E. Bell, et al.
- Architectural style: Italianate; Queen Anne; Romanesque Revival
- NRHP reference No.: 94001099
- Added to NRHP: September 23, 1994

Harlan Courthouse Square Commercial District is a nationally recognized historic district located in Harlan, Iowa, United States. It was listed on the National Register of Historic Places in 1994. At the time of its nomination the district consisted of 54 resources, including 38 contributing buildings, one contributing site, one contributing object, 13 noncontributing buildings, and one noncontributing object. Cross-shaped in plan, the historic district covers most of the city's central business district in the original town plat. Most of the buildings are two-story, brick, commercial buildings. Commercial Italianate and Queen Anne styles are dominant. The Shelby County Courthouse (1893) is a stone Richardsonian Romanesque structure. The courthouse square block and the four surrounding half blocks and rear alleys constitute the contributing site. The Soldier's Monument on the square is the contributing object, and the POW/MIA Monument is the noncontributing object because of its more recent construction.
