= Washington Township, Shelby County, Iowa =

Township in Shelby County, Iowa

Washington Township
- Township
- Interactive map of Washington Township
- Coordinates: 41.735°N 95.500°W
- Country: United States
- State: Iowa
- County: Shelby

Area
  - Total: 36 sq mi (93 km^{2})

Population
  - Total: 650
  - Density: 18/sq mi (6.9/km^{2})

Washington Township is a township in Shelby County, Iowa. There are 650 people and 18 people per square mile in Washington Township. The total area is 36 square miles.

== Geography ==
Washington Township surrounds the city of Panama.
