= George Rewerts House =

Historic house in Iowa, United States

- U.S. National Register of Historic Places
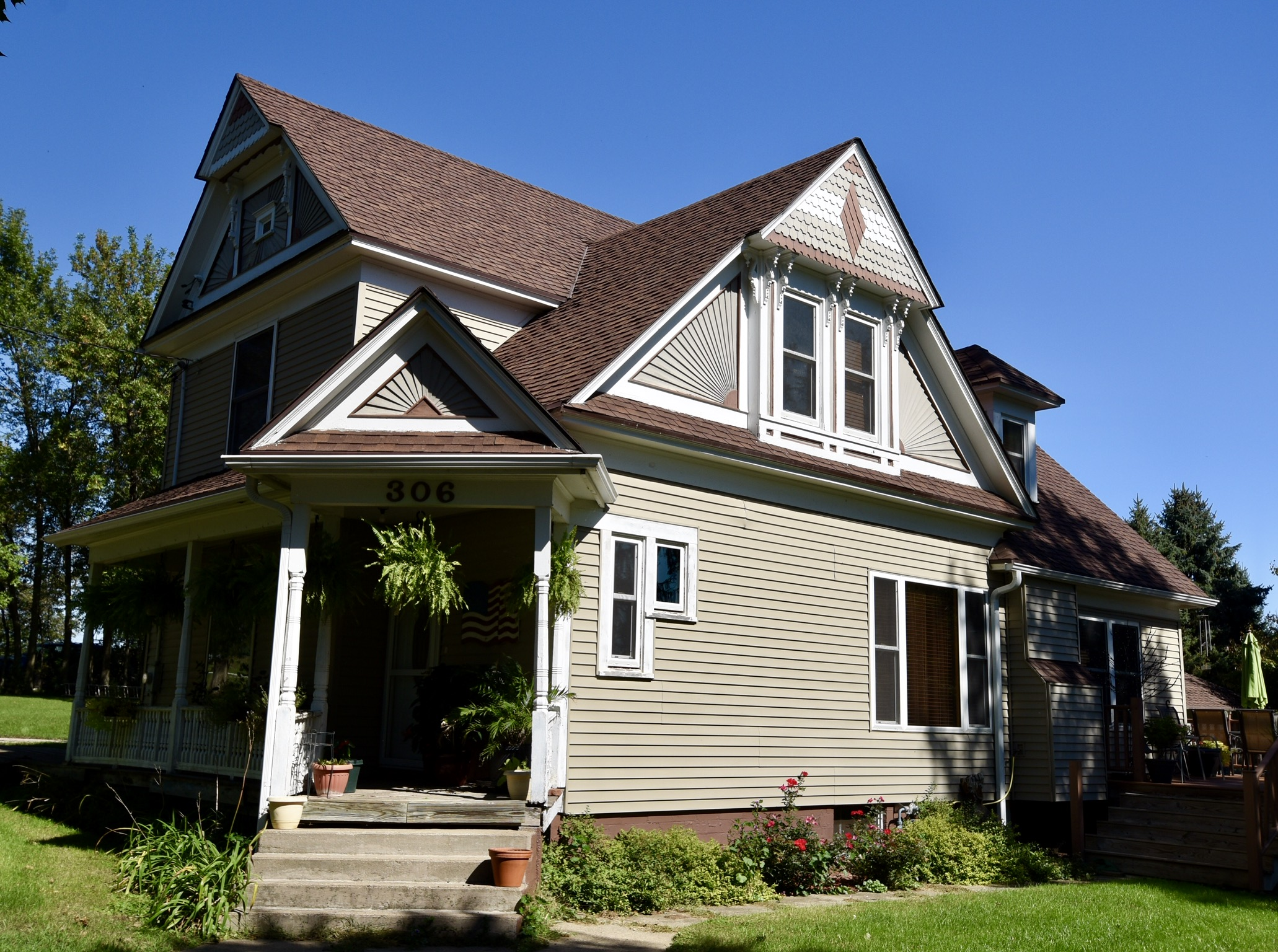

- Location within Iowa Location within the United States
- Location: 306 8th Ave. Defiance, Iowa
- Coordinates: 41°49′45″N 95°20′33″W
- Area: less than one acre
- Built: 1902
- Built by: George Rewerts
- Architectural style: Queen Anne; Stick style
- MPS: Ethnic Historic Settlement of Shelby and Audubon Counties MPS
- NRHP reference No.: 91001450
- Added to NRHP: October 3, 1991

The George Rewerts House is a historic residence located in Defiance, Iowa, United States. It was listed on the National Register of Historic Places in 1991. The historic importance of the house is its association with German immigration into this part of Iowa from 1872 into the 1940s. It is also a fine example of the work of a German immigrant designer and craftsman, and the importance of the local building industry that was established by German immigrants. George Rewerts immigrated to the United States in 1882, and settled in Council Bluffs before moving to Defiance in 1887. He was a carpenter by trade, and worked for the Defiance Lumber Company when he moved here. He bought the company in 1902, the same year he built this house with the assistance of Nels Gregersen and Lee Hulsebus. It is a 2½-story, frame structure with Queen Anne and Stick style influences.
