= Harlan Community School District =

Public school district in Harlan, Iowa, United States

Location
- Harlan, Iowa Shelby and Harrison counties United States
- Coordinates: 41.65795°N 95.33883°W

District information
- Type: Local school district
- Grades: K–12
- Superintendent: Dr Jenny Barnett
- Schools: 4
- Budget: $21,881,000 (2020-21)
- NCES District ID: 1913500

Students and staff
- Students: 1514 (2022-23)
- Teachers: 99.56 FTE
- Staff: 91.13 FTE
- Student–teacher ratio: 15.21
- Athletic conference: Hawkeye 10
- District mascot: Cyclones
- Colors: Red and Black

Other information
- Website: www.harlan.k12.ia.us

The Harlan Community School District is a rural public school district based in Harlan, Iowa. The district is mainly in Shelby County, with a small area in Harrison County. The district serves the towns of Harlan, Defiance, Earling, Panama, Portsmouth and Westphalia, the unincorporated communities of Jacksonville and Corley, and the surrounding rural areas.

The school's mascot is the Cyclones. Their colors are red and black.

== Schools ==
The district operates four schools, all in Harlan:

- Harlan Primary School
- Harlan Intermediate School
- Harlan Community Middle School
- Harlan Community High School

== Harlan Community High School ==
=== Athletics ===
The Cyclones compete in the Hawkeye 10 Conference in the following sports:

==== Fall Sports ====
- Football
  - 14-time Class 3A State Champions (1972, 1982, 1983, 1984, 1993, 1995, 1997, 1998, 2003, 2004, 2005, 2009, 2021, 2022)
- Cross Country (boys and girls)
  - Girls' - 2005 Class 3A State Champions
- Volleyball
  - 2-time Class 4A State Champions (2013, 2014)

==== Winter Sports ====
- Basketball (boys and girls)
  - Boys' - 2-time Class 3A State Champions (2004, 2006)
  - Girls' - 2-time Class 4A State Champions (2014, 2015)
- Bowling
- Wrestling
  - 1967 Class A State Champions

==== Spring Sports ====
- Golf (boys and girls)
  - Girls' - 2-time Class 2A State Champions (1993, 1995)
- Soccer (boys and girls)
- Tennis (boys and girls)
- Track and Field (boys and girls)
  - Boys' 2-time State Champions (1954, 2003)

==== Summer Sports ====
- Baseball
  - 3-time Class 3A State Champions (1996, 2003, 2016)
- Softball

== See also ==
- List of school districts in Iowa
- List of high schools in Iowa
