= Floral Hall, Hornsea =

Entertainment venue in the East Riding of Yorkshire, England

Coordinates: 53.9174°N 0.1630°W

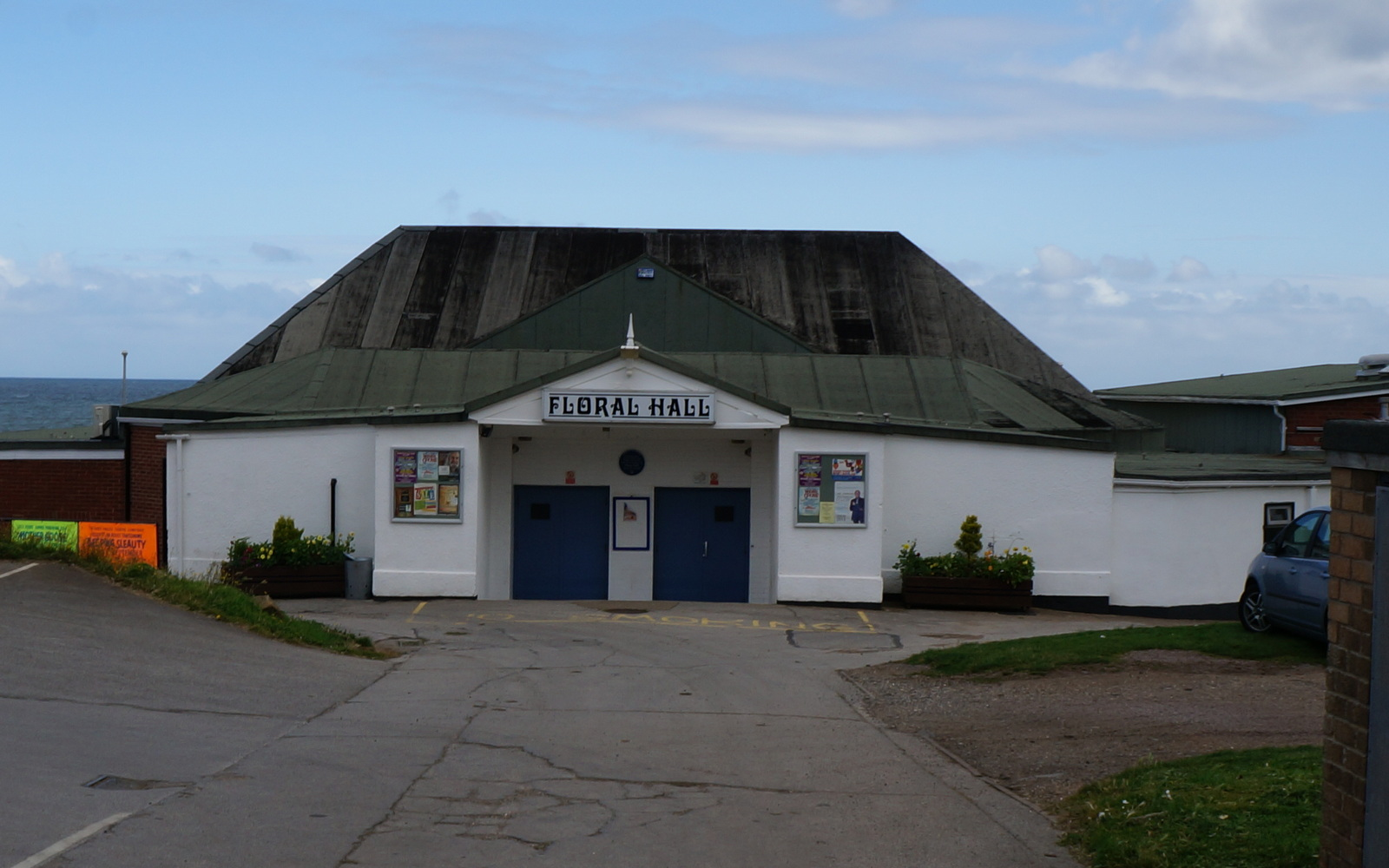
The building, in 2013

The Floral Hall is an entertainment venue in Hornsea, a town in the East Riding of Yorkshire, in England.

The building was constructed in 1913, in a similar style to the Floral Hall, Scarborough, but on a smaller scale. It was constructed of cast iron and steel and had a glass roof. It was designed by J. K. Barr and W. H. Heywood. Its construction cost more than £1,500. It contained an events space with a capacity of 600 people, and a cafe. In the 1920s, heating was installed, and a new cafe was constructed. The venue was used for a variety of concerts, plays and dances.

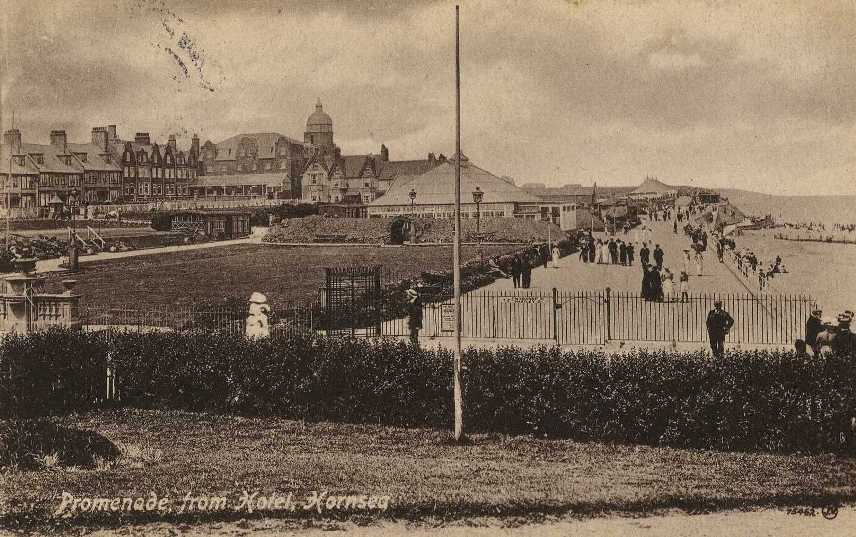
The promenade in Hornsea in 1917, showing the Floral Hall in the centre

The building was further altered in the 1950s and 1960s. Nikolaus Pevsner described the building as "much mutilated". In 2012, the East Riding of Yorkshire Council announced plans to demolish the building, which it stated was losing £100,000 each year. Following protests, it instead sold the venue to a community group for £1.
