= Chris Poldberg Farmstead =

- U.S. National Register of Historic Places
- Location within Iowa Location within the United States
- Location: 0.5 miles south of Iowa Highway 44 on Wolf Creek
- Nearest city: Jacksonville, Iowa
- Coordinates: 41°37′28″N 95°07′54″W
- Area: 2.07 acres (0.84 ha)
- Built: 1907, 1912, 1914
- Built by: Carl V. Andersen
- MPS: Ethnic Historic Settlement of Shelby and Audubon Counties MPS
- NRHP reference No.: 91001459
- Added to NRHP: October 3, 1991

The Chris Poldberg Farmstead is a collection of historic domestic and agricultural buildings located southeast of Jacksonville, Iowa, United States. It was listed on the National Register of Historic Places in 1991. The historic importance of the farmstead is its association with stock farming, an important industry associated with Danish immigrants who settled in Shelby and Audubon counties from 1865 to 1924. The historic designation includes the two-story, foursquare, frame house (1907); the Midwest three portal barn (1912); hog house (1914); poultry house (1914); machine shed (1914); and cob house (1914). The house was built by Carl V. Andersen, and the barn, machine shed, and hog house by Jacksonville carpenter gangs.

Chris Poldberg was born in Denmark in 1862. His original surname was Andersen, but he changed it to avoid confusion with the multiple families in the area whose name was Andersen. He immigrated to the United States in 1885, and settled in Elk Horn, Iowa where he worked as a farm hand. Three year later he married Mary Hoogensen Smith, a widow, and they settled on her farm. Her late husband, Fred Smith, bought the farm from the railroad in 1880. The farm was expanded to 280 acres (110 ha) by 1915. Poldberg raised Shorthorn cattle and hogs, and supplemented with poultry.
