= Panama, Iowa =

- City
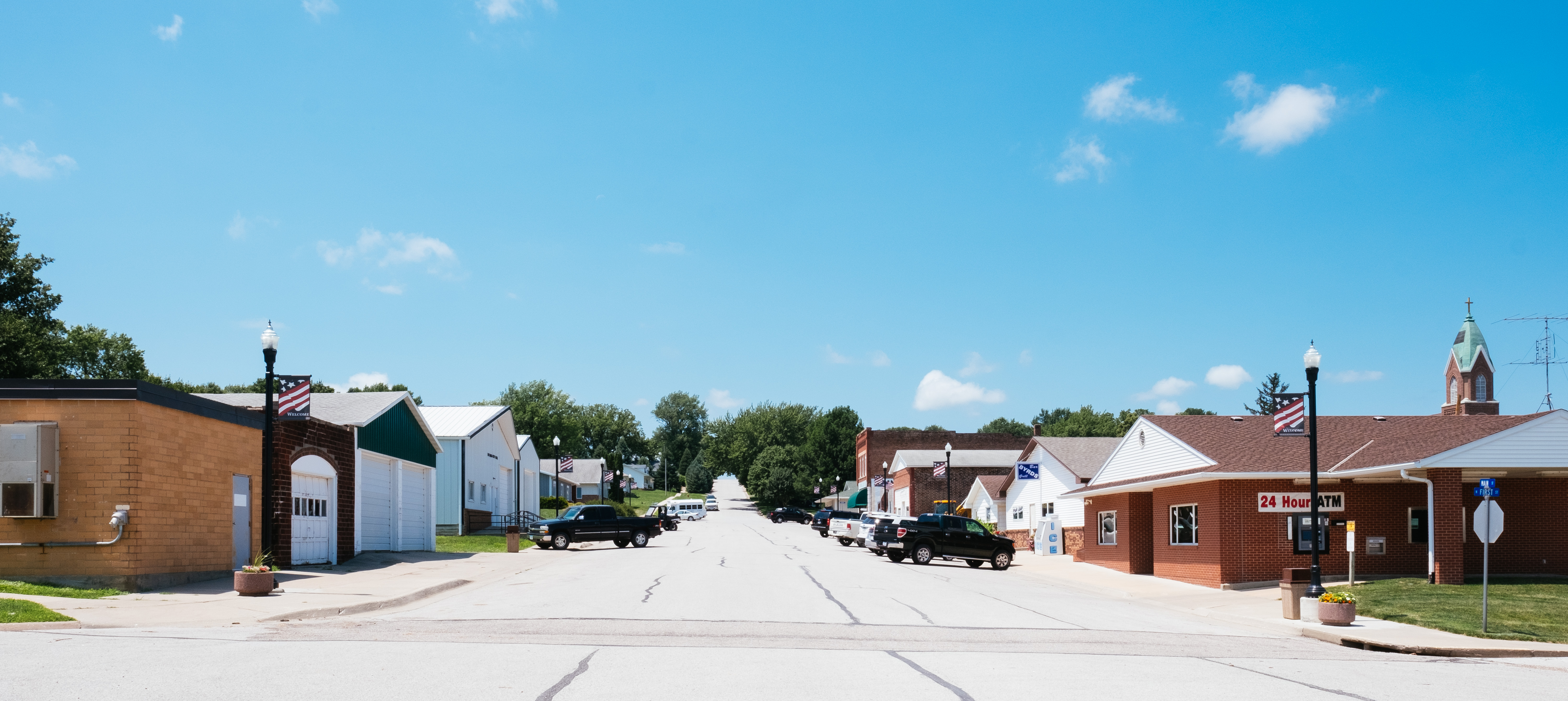
- Downtown Panama

- Location of Panama, Iowa
- Coordinates: 41°43′34″N 95°28′31″W
- Country: United States
- State: Iowa
- County: Shelby

Government

Area
  - Total: 0.29 sq mi (0.75 km^{2})
  - Land: 0.29 sq mi (0.75 km^{2})
  - Water: 0 sq mi (0.00 km^{2})
- Elevation: 1,309 ft (399 m)

Population (2020)
  - Total: 235
  - Density: 810.2/sq mi (312.83/km^{2})
- Time zone: UTC-6 (Central (CST))
  - Summer (DST): UTC-5 (CDT)
- ZIP codes: 51562, 51578
- Area code: 712
- FIPS code: 19-61275
- GNIS feature ID: 2396136
- Website: www.developsource.com/Communities/panama.asp

Panama is a city in Shelby County, Iowa, United States. The population was 235 at the time of the 2020 census.

== History ==
Panama had its start in the year 1882 by the building of the Chicago, Milwaukee and St. Paul Railway through Washington Township.

== Geography ==
According to the United States Census Bureau, the city has a total area of 0.29 square miles (0.75 km^{2}), all of it land.

The community is on Iowa Highway 191, halfway between U.S. Routes 30 and 59

== Demographics ==
Historical populations
Year	Pop.	±%
1890	379	—
1900	221	−41.7%
1910	232	+5.0%
1920	220	−5.2%
1930	256	+16.4%
1940	255	−0.4%
1950	230	−9.8%
1960	257	+11.7%
1970	221	−14.0%
1980	229	+3.6%
1990	201	−12.2%
2000	212	+5.5%
2010	221	+4.2%
2020	235	+6.3%
Source:"U.S. Census website". United States Census Bureau. and Iowa Data Center; Source: U.S. Decennial Census

=== 2020 census ===
As of the census of 2020, there were 235 people, 107 households, and 67 families residing in the city. The population density was 810.2 inhabitants per square mile (312.8/km^{2}). There were 107 housing units at an average density of 368.9 per square mile (142.4/km^{2}). The racial makeup of the city was 97.9% White, 0.0% Black or African American, 0.0% Native American, 0.0% Asian, 0.0% Pacific Islander, 0.0% from other races and 2.1% from two or more races. Hispanic or Latino persons of any race comprised 0.4% of the population.

Of the 107 households, 27.1% of which had children under the age of 18 living with them, 50.5% were married couples living together, 2.8% were cohabitating couples, 29.0% had a female householder with no spouse or partner present and 17.8% had a male householder with no spouse or partner present. 37.4% of all households were non-families. 33.6% of all households were made up of individuals, 20.6% had someone living alone who was 65 years old or older.

The median age in the city was 42.1 years. 28.9% of the residents were under the age of 20; 2.1% were between the ages of 20 and 24; 24.7% were from 25 and 44; 23.0% were from 45 and 64; and 21.3% were 65 years of age or older. The gender makeup of the city was 43.0% male and 57.0% female.

=== 2010 census ===
As of the census of 2010, there were 221 people, 98 households, and 57 families living in the city. The population density was 762.1 inhabitants per square mile (294.2/km^{2}). There were 107 housing units at an average density of 369.0 per square mile (142.5/km^{2}). The racial makeup of the city was 96.4% White, 1.8% from other races, and 1.8% from two or more races. Hispanic or Latino of any race were 1.8% of the population.

There were 98 households, of which 24.5% had children under the age of 18 living with them, 52.0% were married couples living together, 3.1% had a female householder with no husband present, 3.1% had a male householder with no wife present, and 41.8% were non-families. 37.8% of all households were made up of individuals, and 21.5% had someone living alone who was 65 years of age or older. The average household size was 2.26 and the average family size was 2.96.

The median age in the city was 40.5 years. 25.8% of residents were under the age of 18; 5.5% were between the ages of 18 and 24; 23.9% were from 25 to 44; 26.7% were from 45 to 64; and 18.1% were 65 years of age or older. The gender makeup of the city was 46.2% male and 53.8% female.

=== 2000 census ===
As of the census of 2000, there were 212 people, 96 households, and 57 families living in the city. The population density was 745.0 inhabitants per square mile (287.6/km^{2}). There were 105 housing units at an average density of 369.0 per square mile (142.5/km^{2}). The racial makeup of the city was 98.11% White, 0.47% African American, and 1.42% from two or more races.

There were 96 households, out of which 21.9% had children under the age of 18 living with them, 54.2% were married couples living together, 3.1% had a female householder with no husband present, and 39.6% were non-families. 36.5% of all households were made up of individuals, and 18.8% had someone living alone who was 65 years of age or older. The average household size was 2.21 and the average family size was 2.95.

In the city, the population was spread out, with 23.6% under the age of 18, 6.1% from 18 to 24, 28.8% from 25 to 44, 17.9% from 45 to 64, and 23.6% who were 65 years of age or older. The median age was 40 years. For every 100 females, there were 86.0 males. For every 100 females age 18 and over, there were 92.9 males.

The median income for a household in the city was $37,917, and the median income for a family was $55,000. Males had a median income of $29,375 versus $25,556 for females. The per capita income for the city was $20,078. About 3.4% of families and 5.6% of the population were below the poverty line, including none of those under the age of eighteen and 14.0% of those 65 or over.

== Education ==
The Harlan Community School District operates local public schools. The district serves the towns of Harlan, Defiance, Earling, Panama, Portsmouth and Westphalia, the unincorporated communities of Jacksonville and Corley, and the surrounding rural areas.
