= Union Township, Shelby County, Iowa =

Township in Shelby County, Iowa, U.S.

Coordinates: 41.9125°N 94.1075°W

Union Township is a township in Shelby County, Iowa, established on September 4, 1871. There are 680 people and 19.1 people per square mile in Union Township. The total area is 35.7 square miles. The city of Defiance is surrounded by the township.
