= Portsmouth, Iowa =

- City
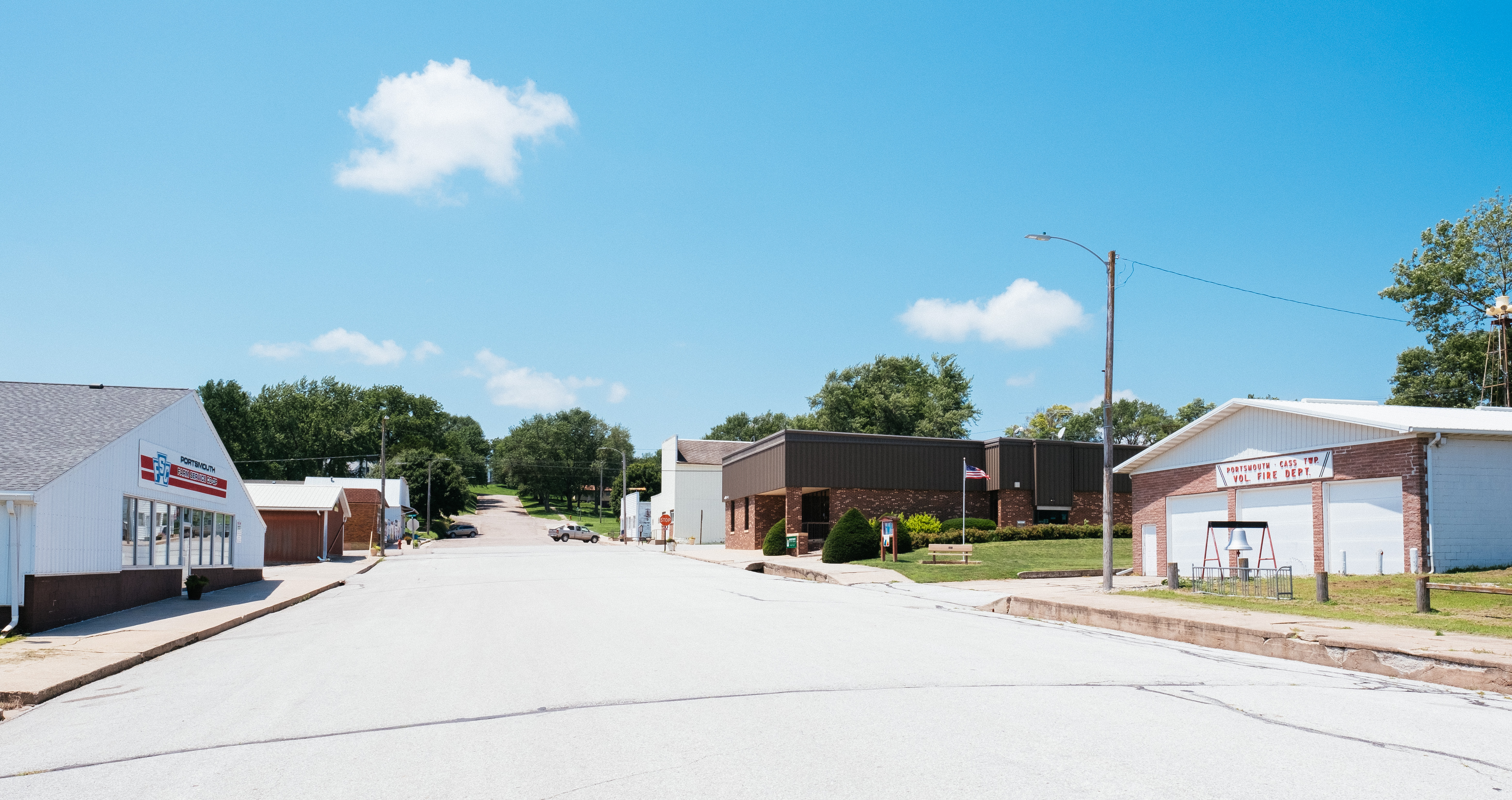
- Downtown Portsmouth

- Location of Portsmouth, Iowa
- Coordinates: 41°39′00″N 95°31′09″W
- Country: United States
- State: Iowa
- County: Shelby

Government
  - Type: Mayor-council
  - Mayor: William Sondag

Area
  - Total: 0.30 sq mi (0.77 km^{2})
  - Land: 0.30 sq mi (0.77 km^{2})
  - Water: 0 sq mi (0.00 km^{2})
- Elevation: 1,224 ft (373 m)

Population (2020)
  - Total: 182
  - Density: 616/sq mi (237.9/km^{2})
- Time zone: UTC-6 (Central (CST))
  - Summer (DST): UTC-5 (CDT)
- ZIP code: 51565
- Area code: 712
- FIPS code: 19-64200
- GNIS feature ID: 2396260
- Website: City of Portsmouth

Portsmouth is a city in Shelby County, Iowa, United States. The population was 182 at the time of the 2020 census.

== History ==
The first permanent settlement at Portsmouth was made by William Williams, who built a log cabin home there in the 1860s.

Portsmouth had its start in the year 1882 when the Chicago, Milwaukee and St. Paul railway platted the town along its tracks.

== Geography ==
According to the United States Census Bureau, the city has a total area of 0.28 square miles (0.73 km^{2}), all of it land.

== Demographics ==
Historical populations
Year	Pop.	±%
1890	250	—
1900	316	+26.4%
1910	347	+9.8%
1920	280	−19.3%
1930	328	+17.1%
1940	320	−2.4%
1950	299	−6.6%
1960	232	−22.4%
1970	239	+3.0%
1980	240	+0.4%
1990	209	−12.9%
2000	225	+7.7%
2010	195	−13.3%
2020	182	−6.7%
Source:"U.S. Census website". United States Census Bureau. and Iowa Data Center; Source: U.S. Decennial Census

=== 2020 census ===
As of the census of 2020, there were 182 people, 86 households, and 54 families residing in the city. The population density was 616.2 inhabitants per square mile (237.9/km^{2}). There were 88 housing units at an average density of 297.9 per square mile (115.0/km^{2}). The racial makeup of the city was 96.7% White, 0.0% Black or African American, 0.0% Native American, 0.0% Asian, 0.0% Pacific Islander, 0.0% from other races and 3.3% from two or more races. Hispanic or Latino persons of any race comprised 0.5% of the population.

Of the 86 households, 32.6% of which had children under the age of 18 living with them, 38.4% were married couples living together, 16.3% were cohabitating couples, 24.4% had a female householder with no spouse or partner present and 20.9% had a male householder with no spouse or partner present. 37.2% of all households were non-families. 26.7% of all households were made up of individuals, 12.8% had someone living alone who was 65 years old or older.

The median age in the city was 45.3 years. 20.3% of the residents were under the age of 20; 5.5% were between the ages of 20 and 24; 23.6% were from 25 and 44; 30.2% were from 45 and 64; and 20.3% were 65 years of age or older. The gender makeup of the city was 50.5% male and 49.5% female.

=== 2010 census ===
As of the census of 2010, there were 195 people, 94 households, and 59 families living in the city. The population density was 696.4 inhabitants per square mile (268.9/km^{2}). There were 98 housing units at an average density of 350.0 per square mile (135.1/km^{2}). The racial makeup of the city was 98.5% White, 0.5% African American, and 1.0% from two or more races.

There were 94 households, of which 19.1% had children under the age of 18 living with them, 47.9% were married couples living together, 10.6% had a female householder with no husband present, 4.3% had a male householder with no wife present, and 37.2% were non-families. 33.0% of all households were made up of individuals, and 18.1% had someone living alone who was 65 years of age or older. The average household size was 2.07 and the average family size was 2.56.

The median age in the city was 51.2 years. 16.9% of residents were under the age of 18; 4.1% were between the ages of 18 and 24; 21.5% were from 25 to 44; 30.9% were from 45 to 64; and 26.7% were 65 years of age or older. The gender makeup of the city was 52.3% male and 47.7% female.

=== 2000 census ===
As of the census of 2000, there were 225 people, 96 households, and 62 families living in the city. The population density was 823.5 inhabitants per square mile (318.0/km^{2}). There were 103 housing units at an average density of 377.0 per square mile (145.6/km^{2}). The racial makeup of the city was 99.56% White, and 0.44% from two or more races. Hispanic or Latino of any race were 0.44% of the population.

There were 96 households, out of which 26.0% had children under the age of 18 living with them, 53.1% were married couples living together, 9.4% had a female householder with no husband present, and 35.4% were non-families. 29.2% of all households were made up of individuals, and 19.8% had someone living alone who was 65 years of age or older. The average household size was 2.34 and the average family size was 2.89.

In the city, the population was spread out, with 23.6% under the age of 18, 7.1% from 18 to 24, 25.3% from 25 to 44, 20.0% from 45 to 64, and 24.0% who were 65 years of age or older. The median age was 40 years. For every 100 females, there were 94.0 males. For every 100 females age 18 and over, there were 89.0 males.

The median income for a household in the city was $28,000, and the median income for a family was $39,250. Males had a median income of $26,818 versus $22,750 for females. The per capita income for the city was $15,473. About 11.9% of families and 14.8% of the population were below the poverty line, including 19.3% of those under the age of eighteen and 9.1% of those 65 or over.

== Education ==
The Harlan Community School District operates local public schools. The district serves the towns of Harlan, Defiance, Earling, Panama, Portsmouth and Westphalia, the unincorporated communities of Jacksonville and Corley, and the surrounding rural areas.
