= Floral Hall (Tipton, Iowa) =

- U.S. National Register of Historic Places
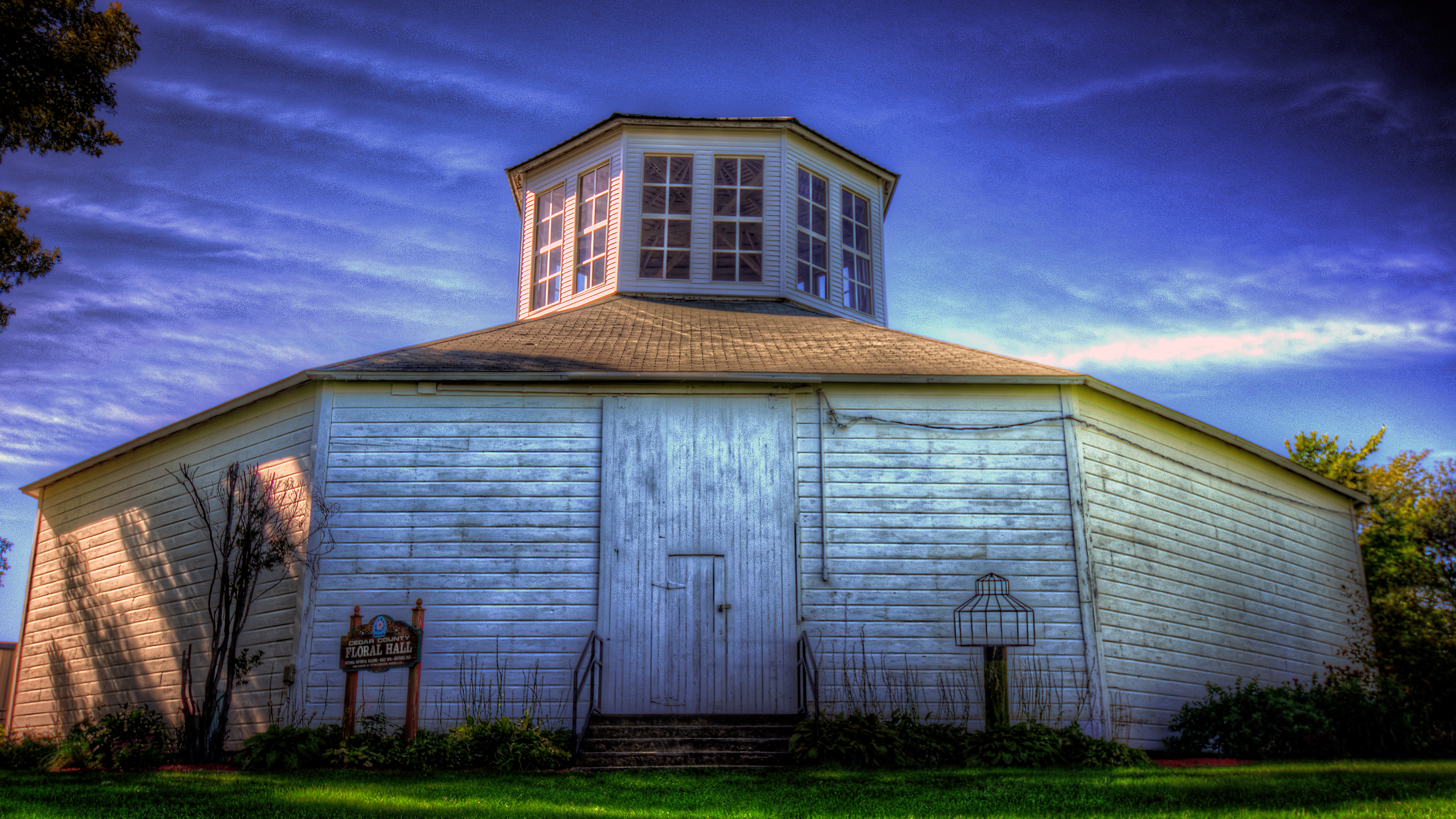

- Location within Iowa Location within the United States
- Location: West of Tipton at the Cedar County Fairgrounds
- Coordinates: 41°46′25″N 91°08′38″W
- Area: less than one acre
- Built: 1899
- NRHP reference No.: 76000741
- Added to NRHP: November 7, 1976

Floral Hall is a historic building located at the Cedar County Fairgrounds in Tipton, Iowa, United States. It was listed on the National Register of Historic Places in 1976. The facility was built for use as a floral display area, and has maintained that use. It was built in 1899 and replaced a previous Floral Hall that had occupied the same location. The directors of the Tipton Fair Association determined that its construction would cost approximately $1,000. H.L. Dean, the superintendent of construction, held to that figure. However, while the building was being built it was decided to install a hard-pine floor, which added $250 to its cost.

Floral Hall is an octagon-shaped structure with a large matching cupola on top. Each side of the building has a width of 30 feet (9 m). A large sliding door is located on each of the four main directions. The interior is painted and mostly open with only its supports to break up the space.
