= Shelby Consolidated School =

- U.S. National Register of Historic Places
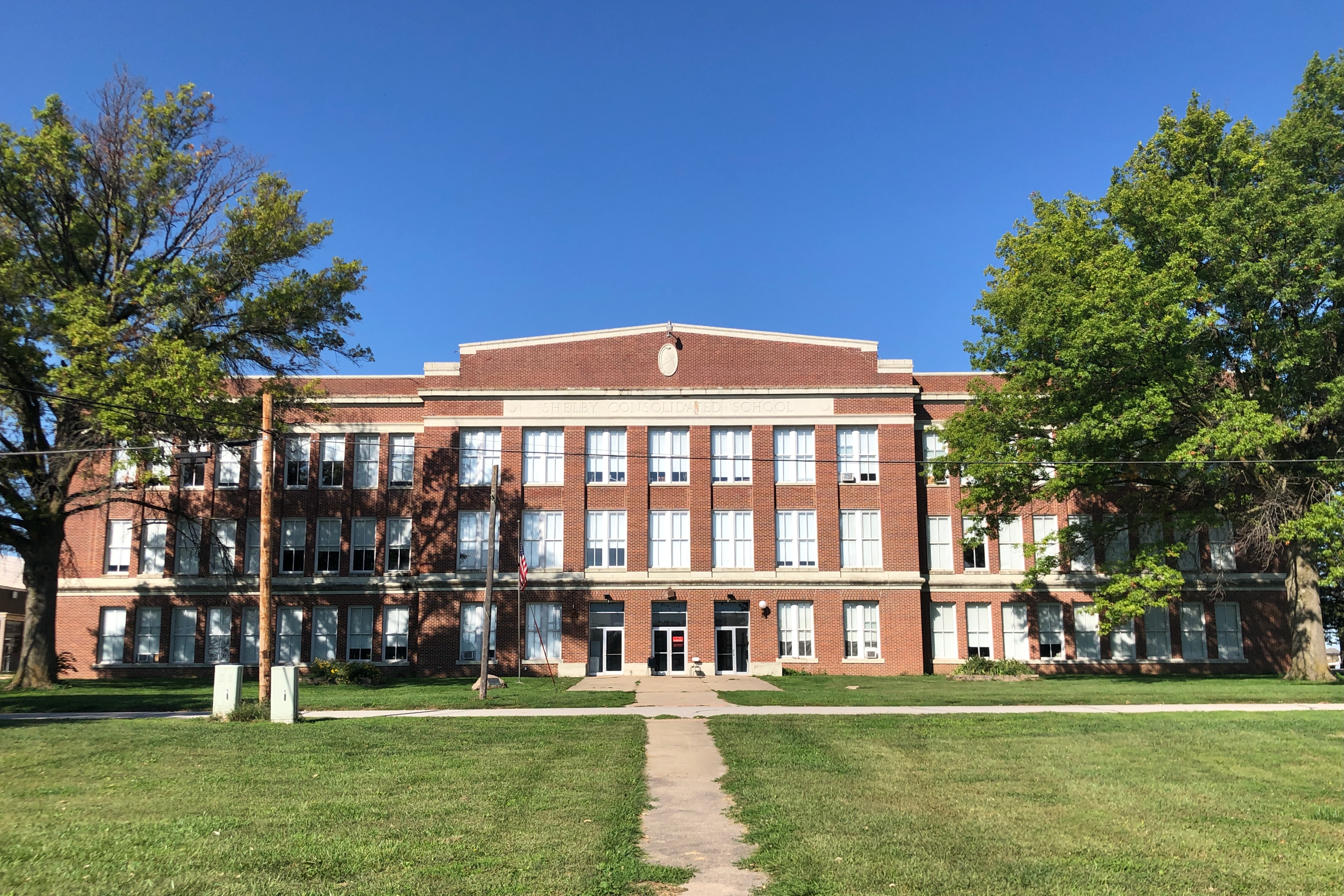
- The former school building in 2025

- Location within Iowa Location within the United States
- Location: 304 Western Ave. Shelby, Iowa
- Coordinates: 41°31′00″N 95°27′31″W
- Area: 9 acres (3.6 ha)
- Built: 1922
- Built by: J. E. Wakefield Construction Company
- Architect: John Latenser & Sons
- Architectural style: Late 19th and 20th Century Revivals
- MPS: Public Schools for Iowa: Growth and Change MPS
- NRHP reference No.: 13001139
- Added to NRHP: February 5, 2014

The Shelby Consolidated School, also known as Shelby-Tenant Community School, is a historic building located in Shelby, Iowa, United States. The first school in Shelby was organized in 1870. In 1919 the Consolidated Independent School District of Shelby was created from eight school districts. This building replaced an 1899 structure on the same site. It was designed by the Omaha architectural firm of John Latenser & Sons. The brick, three-story, U-shaped Neoclassical-inspired structure is typical of the many "school buildings that made Latenser a highly respected name in school architecture in the early twentieth century." It is also the only known extant building designed by the firm in Western Iowa. The facility is a fine example of consolidated school design that state officials, prominent school architects, and education professionals advocated for at the time it was built. A new gymnasium was added in 1975. The Shelby-Tenant Community School District was discontinued in 2004, and this building was left vacant. It was listed on the National Register of Historic Places in 2014, and converted into an apartment building called the Cardinal Lofts.
