= Westphalia, Iowa =

- City
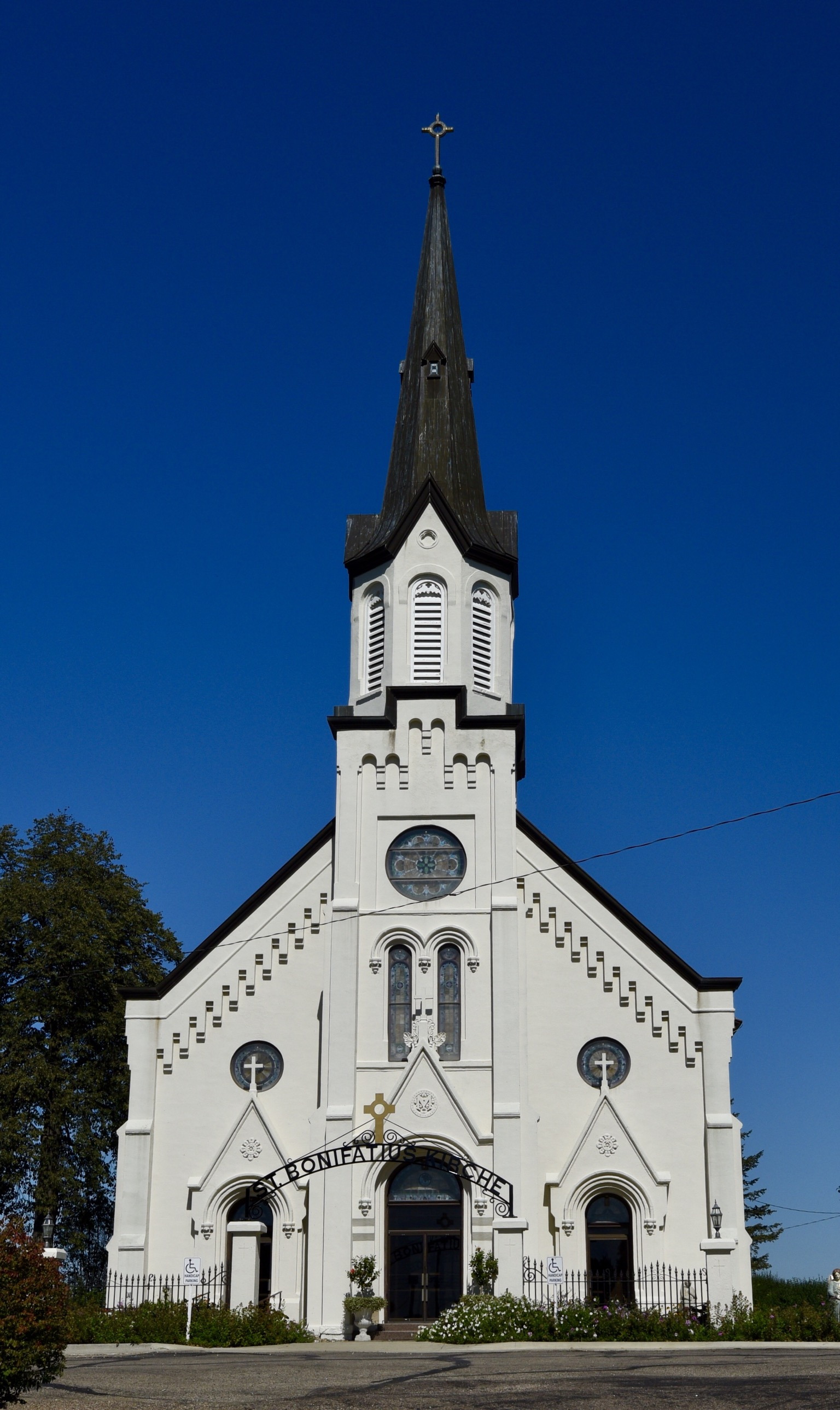
- St. Boniface Catholic Church

- Location of Westphalia, Iowa
- Coordinates: 41°43′09″N 95°23′37″W
- Country: United States
- State: Iowa
- County: Shelby

Area
  - Total: 0.097 sq mi (0.25 km^{2})
  - Land: 0.097 sq mi (0.25 km^{2})
  - Water: 0 sq mi (0.00 km^{2})
- Elevation: 1,411 ft (430 m)

Population (2020)
  - Total: 126
  - Density: 1,319.6/sq mi (509.49/km^{2})
- Time zone: UTC-6 (Central (CST))
  - Summer (DST): UTC-5 (CDT)
- ZIP code: 51578
- Area code: 712
- FIPS code: 19-84540
- GNIS feature ID: 2397283
- Website: www.netins.net/ricweb/community/westphal/westphal.htm

Westphalia is a city in Shelby County, Iowa, United States. The population was 126 at the time of the 2020 census.

== History ==
Westphalia was founded in 1872 as a colony of German Catholic farmers and small merchants. It was named after the Province of Westphalia, in Germany.

== Geography ==
According to the United States Census Bureau, the city has a total area of 0.10 square miles (0.26 km^{2}), all of it land. The City of Westphalia is surrounded by Westphalia Township.

== Demographics ==
Historical populations
Year	Pop.	±%
1880	55	—
1890	49	−10.9%
1900	46	−6.1%
1910	43	−6.5%
1920	115	+167.4%
1930	118	+2.6%
1940	126	+6.8%
1950	160	+27.0%
1960	131	−18.1%
1970	121	−7.6%
1980	169	+39.7%
1990	144	−14.8%
2000	160	+11.1%
2010	127	−20.6%
2020	126	−0.8%
Source:"U.S. Census website". United States Census Bureau. and Iowa Data Center; Source: U.S. Decennial Census

=== 2020 census ===
As of the census of 2020, there were 126 people, 59 households, and 44 families residing in the city. The population density was 1,319.6 inhabitants per square mile (509.5/km^{2}). There were 59 housing units at an average density of 617.9 per square mile (238.6/km^{2}). The racial makeup of the city was 97.6% White, 0.0% Black or African American, 0.8% Native American, 0.0% Asian, 0.0% Pacific Islander, 0.0% from other races and 1.6% from two or more races. Hispanic or Latino persons of any race comprised 0.8% of the population.

Of the 59 households, 42.4% of which had children under the age of 18 living with them, 47.5% were married couples living together, 3.4% were cohabitating couples, 28.8% had a female householder with no spouse or partner present and 20.3% had a male householder with no spouse or partner present. 25.4% of all households were non-families. 23.7% of all households were made up of individuals, 8.5% had someone living alone who was 65 years old or older.

The median age in the city was 44.3 years. 27.0% of the residents were under the age of 20; 3.2% were between the ages of 20 and 24; 21.4% were from 25 and 44; 33.3% were from 45 and 64; and 15.1% were 65 years of age or older. The gender makeup of the city was 48.4% male and 51.6% female.

=== 2010 census ===
At the 2010 census there were 127 people in 59 households, including 36 families, in the city. The population density was 1,270.0 inhabitants per square mile (490.3/km^{2}). There were 62 housing units at an average density of 620.0 per square mile (239.4/km^{2}). The racial makup of the city was 100.0% White. Hispanic or Latino of any race were 3.9%.

Of the 59 households 25.4% had children under the age of 18 living with them, 50.8% were married couples living together, 8.5% had a female householder with no husband present, 1.7% had a male householder with no wife present, and 39.0% were non-families. 39.0% of households were one person and 15.3% were one person aged 65 or older. The average household size was 2.15 and the average family size was 2.89.

The median age was 45.5 years. 20.5% of residents were under the age of 18; 8.6% were between the ages of 18 and 24; 20.4% were from 25 to 44; 33% were from 45 to 64; and 17.3% were 65 or older. The gender makeup of the city was 50.4% male and 49.6% female.

=== 2000 census ===
At the 2000 census there were 160 people in 61 households, including 43 families, in the city. The population density was 1,761.4 inhabitants per square mile (680.1/km^{2}). There were 64 housing units at an average density of 704.6 per square mile (272.0/km^{2}). The racial makup of the city was 100.00% White. Of the 61 households 37.7% had children under the age of 18 living with them, 62.3% were married couples living together, 3.3% had a female householder with no husband present, and 29.5% were non-families. 26.2% of households were one person and 18.0% were one person aged 65 or older. The average household size was 2.62 and the average family size was 3.26.

The age distribution was 30.6% under the age of 18, 5.0% from 18 to 24, 33.8% from 25 to 44, 13.8% from 45 to 64, and 16.9% 65 or older. The median age was 37 years. For every 100 females, there were 86.0 males. For every 100 females age 18 and over, there were 88.1 males.

The median household income was $35,938 and the median family income was $47,500. Males had a median income of $35,833 versus $20,417 for females. The per capita income for the city was $17,066. About 7.9% of families and 11.2% of the population were below the poverty line, including 18.6% of those under the age of eighteen and 16.7% of those sixty five or over.

== Education ==
The Harlan Community School District operates local public schools. The district serves the towns of Harlan, Defiance, Earling, Panama, Portsmouth and Westphalia, the unincorporated communities of Jacksonville and Corley, and the surrounding rural areas.

== See also ==
- St. Boniface Catholic Church (Westphalia, Iowa), listed on the National Register of Historic Places.
