= Westphalia Township, Shelby County, Iowa =

Township in Shelby County, Iowa, U.S.

Coordinates: 41.7362°N 95.3843°W

Westphalia Township is a township in Shelby County, Iowa. There are 554 people and 15.2 people per square mile in Westphalia Township. The total area is 36.5 square miles.

== Geography ==
Westphalia Township surrounds the city of Westphalia.
