= Shelby County Courthouse (Iowa) =

- U.S. National Register of Historic Places
- U.S. Historic district – Contributing property
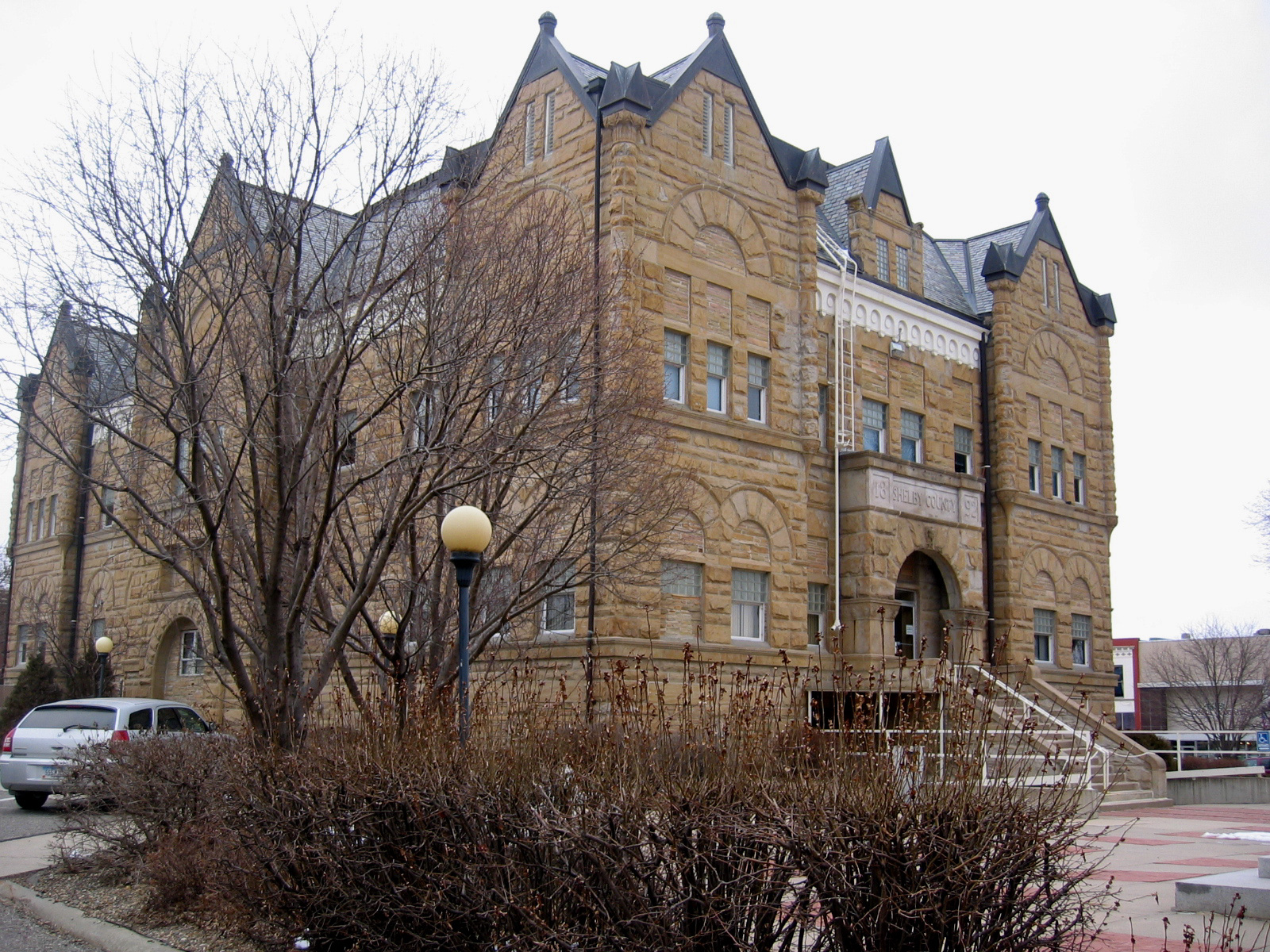

- Location within Iowa Location within the United States
- Interactive map showing the location of Shelby County Courthouse
- Location: 7th and Court Sts. Harlan, Iowa
- Coordinates: 41°39′29.3″N 95°19′05.7″W
- Area: less than one acre
- Built: 1893
- Built by: W.H. Cockerell
- Architect: Charles E. Bell
- Architectural style: Romanesque
- Part of: Harlan Courthouse Square Commercial District (ID94001099)
- MPS: County Courthouses in Iowa TR
- NRHP reference No.: 78001258
- Added to NRHP: November 14, 1978

The Shelby County Courthouse in Harlan, Iowa, United States, was built in 1892. It was individually listed on the National Register of Historic Places in 1978 as a part of the County Courthouses in Iowa Thematic Resource. In 1994 it was included as a contributing property in the Harlan Courthouse Square Commercial District. The courthouse is the third building the county has used for court functions and county administration.

== History ==
The first county seat for Shelby County was located in a place called Shelbyville. There is no mention of a courthouse there, but it is assumed that a building of some sort was used for county business for the three years it was the county seat. After it was moved to Harlan, a two-story frame building was erected in 1860 for the courthouse. A second courthouse was built for $4,250 in 1875. It was a two-story frame structure as well. In 1882 the use of the courtroom was limited to court functions, school elections, and religious services for denominations that did not have their own building. An architect requested that the vaults be condemned in 1890 as they did not protect the county records from fire. They were removed to a different building.

Construction on the present courthouse was begun in 1892 and it was built for $62,733.90. Charles E. Bell of Council Bluffs designed the Richardsonian Romanesque style building. W.H. Cockerell of Harlan was the contractor. The cornerstone was laid on August 4, 1892, and the building was dedicated on November 13, 1893. The courthouse tower of galvanized iron and wood was too heavy for the structure and it had to be removed for $563 nine years after it was built. A $300,000 renovation of the building, which included installation of its first elevator, was completed in 1978.

A Soldier's monument was erected on the courthouse square in 1916. It is a contributing object in the historic district and the square itself is a contributing site. There is also a POW/MIA Monument that was erected in 1992.

== Architecture ==
The courthouse is constructed of Berea sandstone and features a slate roof. The dimensions of the building are 63-by-113-foot (19 by 34 m) and it is two stories above a raised basement. The south elevation has a projecting archway with large voussoirs above a recessed entrance. The east and west elevations each have a central pavilion that projects from the main building and terminates in a gable end. The four corners also feature projecting pavilions with gable ends on each elevation. White colored stone trim runs below the central roofline with a small dormer on the main facade. Originally, a bell tower at a height of 130 feet (40 m) topped the building.
