= Floral Hall (Harlan, Iowa) =

- U.S. National Register of Historic Places
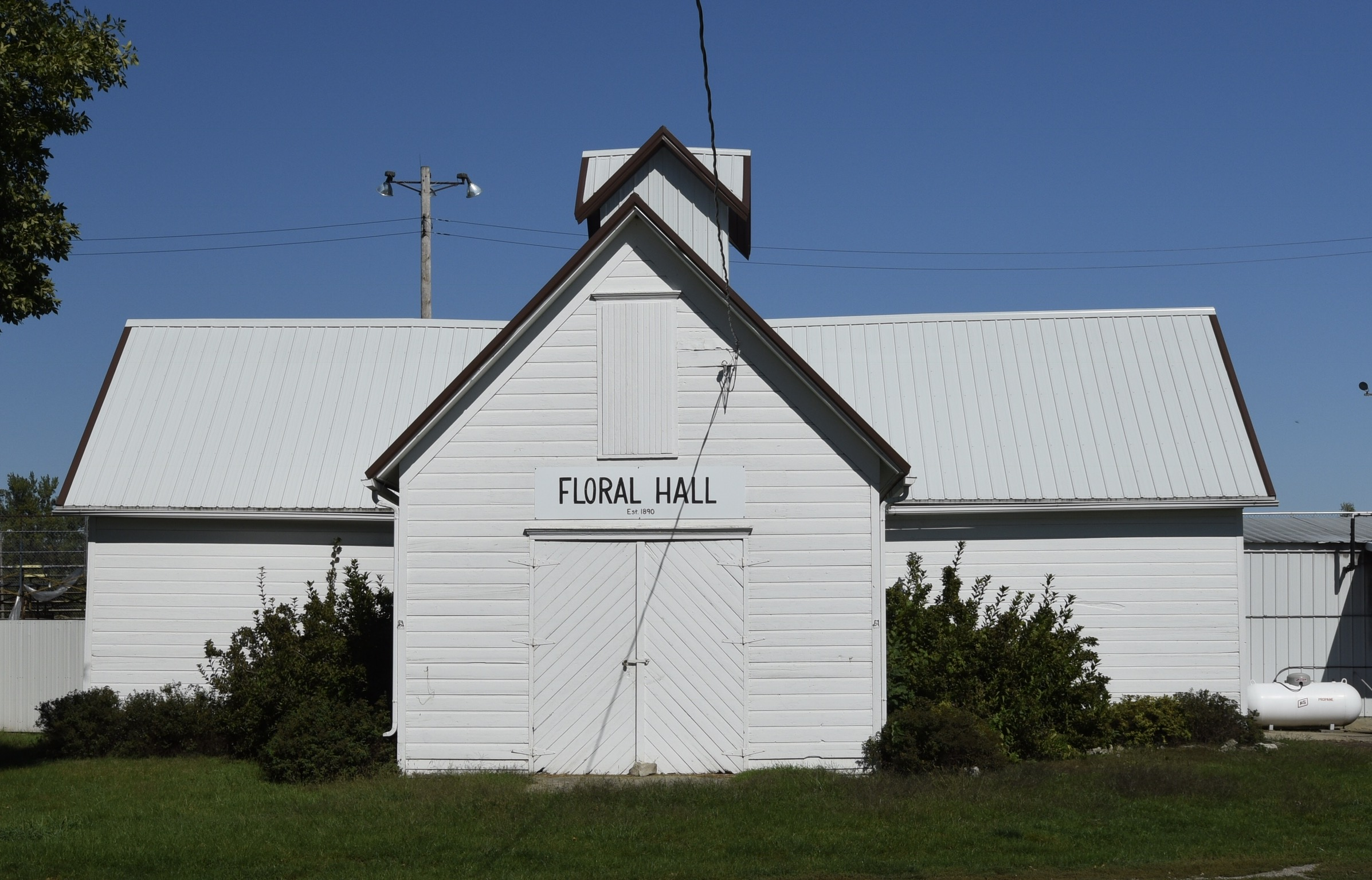

- Location within Iowa Location within the United States
- Location: 314 4th St. on Shelby County Fairgrounds, Harlan, Iowa
- Coordinates: 41°39′53″N 95°18′48″W
- Area: less than one acre
- NRHP reference No.: 85000765
- Added to NRHP: April 11, 1985

Floral Hall is a historic building located at the Shelby County Fairgrounds in Harlan, Iowa, United States. It was listed on the National Register of Historic Places in 1985. The cross-shaped, frame structure is the oldest building on the fairgrounds, and one of the oldest, relatively unaltered, county fair exhibition buildings in Iowa. It is composed of four identical 18-by-18-foot (5.5 by 5.5 m) sections organized around a 18-foot (5.5 m)-square central section, which is capped with a square cupola. Both the building and the cupola are capped with a gable roof. The exhibition hall was built by the Shelby County Agricultural Society, who organized the agricultural fair in 1869. They bought the present fairgrounds in 1879, and this building was built sometime between that year and 1882 to house exhibits that were of interest to women. Over the years it has housed a variety of exhibits. The Shelby County Fair Association took over the fair in 1891
