= St. Boniface Catholic Church (Westphalia, Iowa) =

- Saint Boniface Catholic Church District
- U.S. National Register of Historic Places
- U.S. Historic district
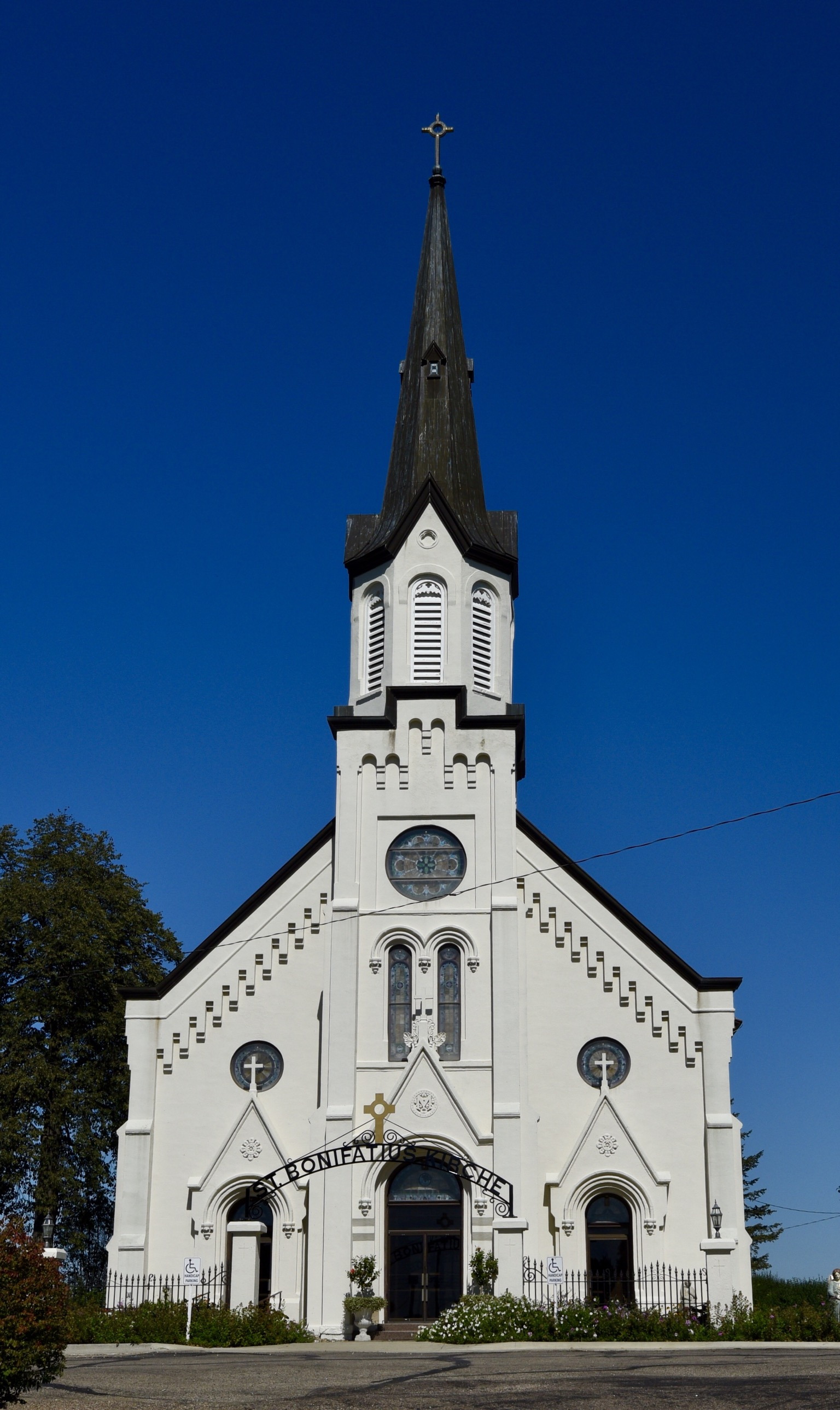

- Location within Iowa Location within the United States
- Location: Three blocks north of County Road F32, Westphalia, Iowa
- Coordinates: 41°43′17″N 95°23′44″W
- Area: 13.1 acres (5.3 ha)
- Built: 1882
- Architect: Fridolin Heer (church); Creeglon and Berlinghof (rectory); Lahr and Stangel (school)
- Architectural style: Romanesque Revival
- MPS: Ethnic Historic Settlement of Shelby and Audubon Counties MPS
- NRHP reference No.: 91001449
- Added to NRHP: October 3, 1991

St. Boniface Catholic Church is a parish of the Diocese of Des Moines. The church is located in Westphalia, Iowa, United States, and the parish plant is listed on the National Register of Historic Places as Saint Boniface Catholic Church District. At the time of its nomination the district consisted of 16 resources, including six contributing buildings, one contributing structure, two contributing sites, one contributing object, six noncontributing buildings, and one noncontributing object.

== History ==
The area that is now Westphalia was settled by German Catholics in the 1870s. The community's founder, Herman Schwarte, envisioned a peaceful village where Germans could work the land, be self-sufficient and help one another. The community would be centered on their own church. The Emil Flusche home was the location of the first Catholic Mass. He was the land agent for the railroad who encouraged German Catholics to settle here and helped establish a Catholic church in this community. Bishop John Hennessy of the Diocese of Dubuque bought the property and established the parish in 1873. The cemetery was laid out the following year. In 1881 St Boniface became a parish in the Diocese of Davenport when it was established. Father Weber was the pastor when the church was built. Bishop John McMullen of Davenport dedicated it in 1882. The rectory (1888) and the carriage house/ barn were built during the pastorate of Msgr. Brommenschenkel. St. Boniface became a parish of the Diocese of Des Moines when it was established in 1911. It was incorporated the following year.

The Rev. Hubert Duren became the pastor in 1926 after a period of decline for the town. He was born and grew up in Cazenovia, Wisconsin, the son of German immigrant parents. Duren's ordination in his native Diocese of La Crosse was blocked by the German clergy there, in part, because he led a group of students who opposed German language instruction at Saint Francis de Sales Seminary in Milwaukee. He was ordained for the Diocese of Des Moines instead. Duren is credited with the community's rebirth through his Complete Life Program and the Westphalia Consumers Cooperative Association. The intent of the Complete Life Program was to integrate religion, education, recreation, commerce, and credit in the communal life of the town. The cooperative was established after the Great Depression affected an already poor farm economy as a way to overcome individualism in rural life and to help the locals make a just living. It was inspired by the Papal encyclical Quadragesimo Anno (1931) of Pope Pius XI, and based on a similar cooperative in Rochdale, England. Duren also established the Villa Nova homes program which pooled the labor of local residents to build the houses and allowed the people to own their own homes. He also established a parish credit union, cooperative store, and a gas station. It was during his 36-year pastorate that the parochial school (1927), ball diamond (c. 1927), Shrine of Our Lady of Grace (1930), corn crib (First Fruits; 1933), and the clubhouse (1934) were built.

== Architecture ==
St. Boniface Church was designed by Dubuque architect Fridolin Heer in the Romanesque Revival style. The workers baked their own bricks on site to build the church. It follows a rectangular plan and features a central bell tower capped with a spire, and three entry doors across the main facade. At one time the interior was richly decorated with a reredos behind the altar, statues, and stenciling. Except for a few statues, it was all removed in a renovation in 1971. The church and the rectory were covered with stucco in 1919. The rectory is a two-story brick residence capped with a truncated hipped roof. It was designed by the Omaha architectural firm of Creeglon and Berlinghof. The school building is a 2½-story brick structure designed by Lahr and Stangel of Omaha. It features a monumental stone veneered central entry. The cemetery is notable for a significant number of cast iron and hand-wrought iron crosses for grave markers. There is also a frame, Romanesque Revival, Chapel of St. Joseph located near the cemetery gate.
