= St. Paul's Episcopal Church (Harlan, Iowa) =

- St. Paul’s Episcopal Church
- U.S. National Register of Historic Places
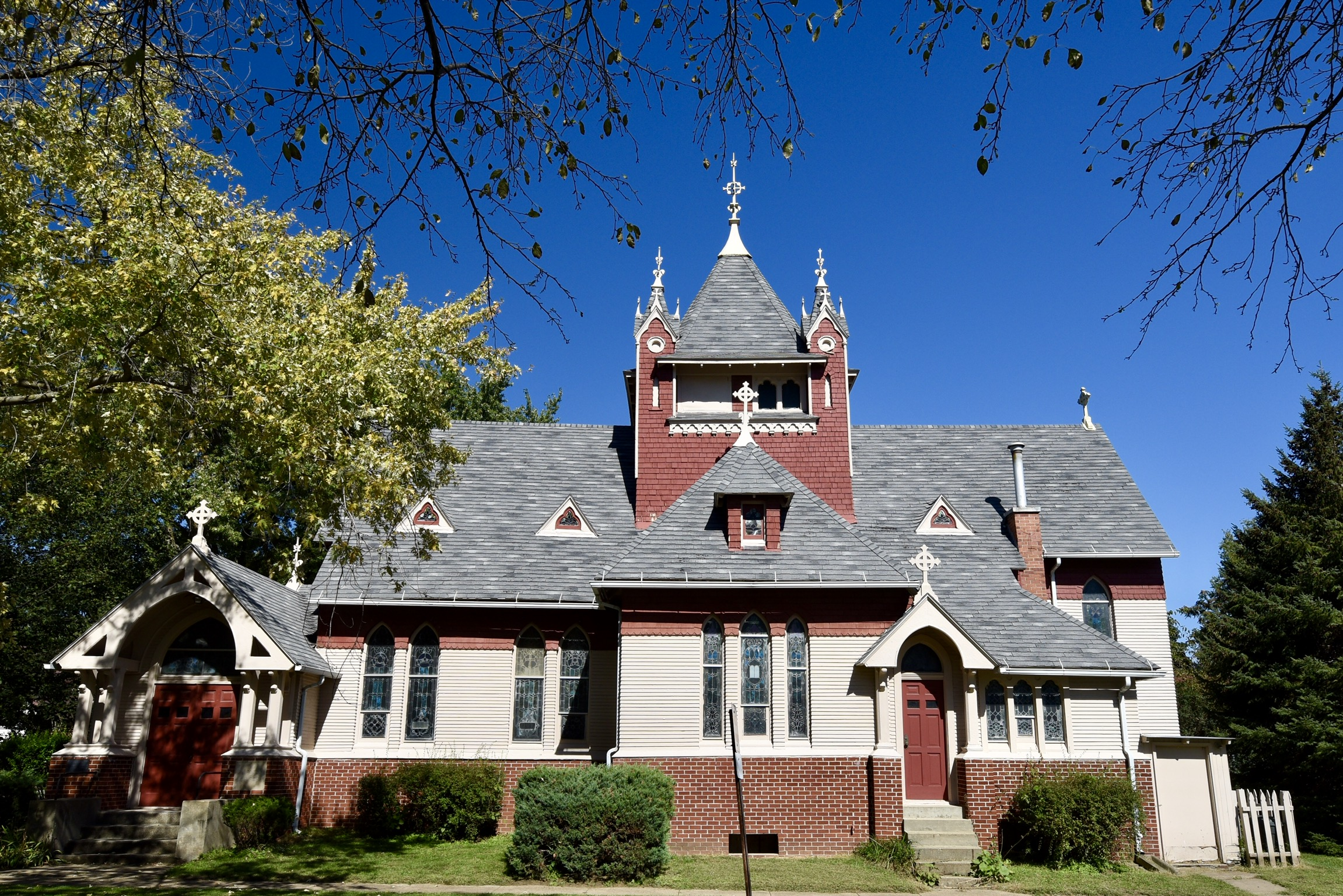

- Location within Iowa Location within the United States
- Location: 712 Farnham St. Harlan, Iowa
- Coordinates: 41°39′16″N 95°19′4″W
- Area: less than one acre
- Built: 1900
- Architect: Proudfoot & Bird
- Architectural style: Shingle Style
- NRHP reference No.: 78001259
- Added to NRHP: September 1, 1978

St. Paul's Episcopal Church is a parish church in the Diocese of Iowa. The church is located in Harlan, Iowa, United States. It has been listed on the National Register of Historic Places in 1978.

In 2015, the church reported 76 members; in 2023, it reported 44 members. No membership statistics were reported in 2024 national parochial reports. Plate and pledge financial support reported by the church in 2024 was $55,754. Average Sunday Attendance (ASA) reported in 2024 was 16 persons. This was a relative decrease from ASA of 33 persons reported in 2018.

== History ==
The Episcopal Church was organized in Harlan in 1881. Regular services, however, were not held until 1896, the year the parish was founded. The congregation held services in a rented room on the east side of the courthouse square until this church was opened in 1900. The Shingle style building was designed by the Des Moines architectural firm of Proudfoot & Bird. In 1950 the basement of the church was excavated. The church building was listed on the National Register of Historic Places in 1978.

== Architecture ==
St. Paul's Church follows a cross-shaped plan that measures 65 by 33 feet (20 by 10 m). It is eclectic in style in that it combines the Shingle Style and Gothic Revival decorative elements that are expressed through different types of materials. The lowest level of the exterior is brick, above which are narrow clapboards up to the imposts of the lancet windows, and shingling above that to the eaves. Shingling is also found on the main facade. The structure is capped by a busy roofscape. The main roof is a high-pitched gable that features small triangular dormers. The transepts have hip roofs, and they too have small dormers. The narthex's gable roof sits at a right angle to the main roof. There is another hipped roof over the central bay of the narthex that houses the baptistery.

Rising above the main roof is a short, square, central tower. Although clad in shingles, it suggests the Richardsonian Romanesque style and appears out of scale to the rest of the building. The tower features pinnacles on its corners and it culminates in a high-peaked roof with a finial on top. There are also finials on several other roof and dormer peaks.

Lancet windows are located in the nave and transepts. There are trefoil windows in the dormers. A large, recessed rose window is located on the front facade of the nave, and a triptych window located on the opposite end of the church over the altar. Entrances into the church are located in three of the four corners. They, like the windows, employ the pointed arch, and are recessed below bargeboards.

The interior features an oak hammerbeam ceiling, plaster walls, and wainscoting. The pointed arch predominates throughout.
