= Floral Hall, Scarborough =

Former theatre in North Yorkshire, England

Coordinates: 54.2909°N 0.4056°W

The Floral Hall was an entertainment venue in Scarborough, North Yorkshire, England. It was demolished in 1989 and replaced by the Scarborough Bowls Centre.
