= Jacksonville, Iowa =

- Census-designated place
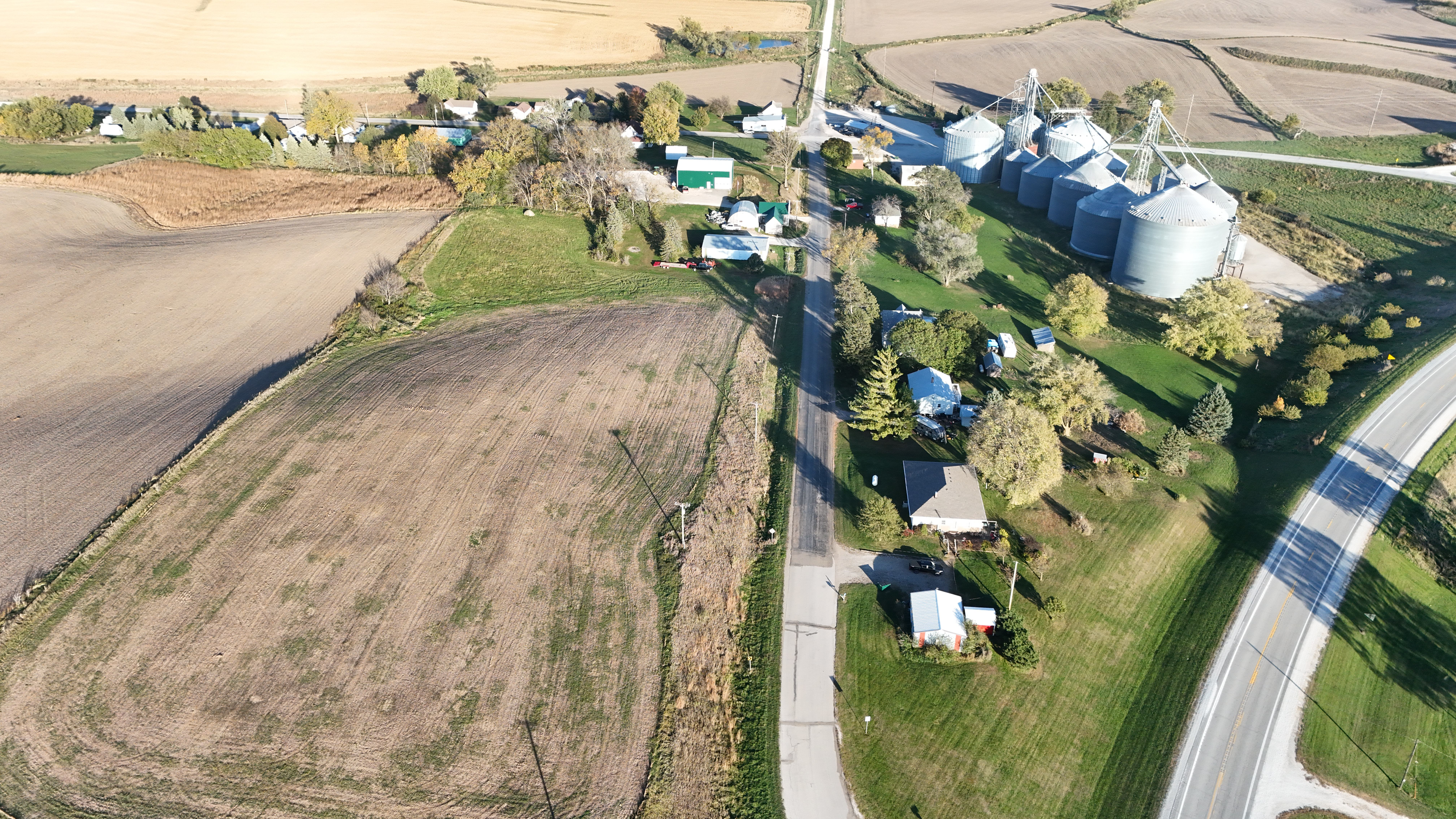
- Jacksonville, looking east along 1000th street

- Location within Iowa
- Coordinates: 41°38′42″N 95°09′06″W
- Country: United States
- State: Iowa
- County: Shelby

Area
  - Total: 0.097 sq mi (0.25 km^{2})
  - Land: 0.097 sq mi (0.25 km^{2})
  - Water: 0 sq mi (0.00 km^{2})
- Elevation: 1,303 ft (397 m)

Population (2020)
  - Total: 29
  - Density: 294.9/sq mi (113.85/km^{2})
- Time zone: UTC-6 (Central (CST))
  - Summer (DST): UTC-5 (CDT)
- ZIP code: 51537
- Area code: 712
- GNIS feature ID: 2583483

Jacksonville is an unincorporated community and census-designated place (CDP) in Jackson Township, Shelby County, Iowa, in the United States. As of the 2020 Census the population of Jacksonville was 29.

== History ==
Jacksonville was originally built up chiefly by the Danish. Jacksonville's population was 12 in 1902, and 75 in 1925. The population was 50 in 1940.

== Education ==
The Harlan Community School District operates local public schools. The district serves the towns of Harlan, Defiance, Earling, Panama, Portsmouth and Westphalia, the unincorporated communities of Jacksonville and Corley, and the surrounding rural areas.

== Demographics ==
Historical population
Census	Pop.	Note	%±
2010	30		—
2020	29		−3.3%
U.S. Decennial Census

=== 2020 census ===
As of the census of 2020, there were 29 people, 6 households, and 3 families residing in the community. The population density was 294.9 inhabitants per square mile (113.9/km^{2}). There were 13 housing units at an average density of 132.2 per square mile (51.0/km^{2}). The racial makeup of the community was 86.2% White, 3.4% Black or African American, 0.0% Native American, 0.0% Asian, 0.0% Pacific Islander, 0.0% from other races and 10.3% from two or more races. Hispanic or Latino persons of any race comprised 0.0% of the population.

Of the 6 households, 0.0% of which had children under the age of 18 living with them, 50.0% were married couples living together, 0.0% were cohabitating couples, 0.0% had a female householder with no spouse or partner present and 50.0% had a male householder with no spouse or partner present. 50.0% of all households were non-families. 50.0% of all households were made up of individuals, 0.0% had someone living alone who was 65 years old or older.

The median age in the community was 61.5 years. 13.8% of the residents were under the age of 20; 10.3% were between the ages of 20 and 24; 10.3% were from 25 and 44; 44.8% were from 45 and 64; and 20.7% were 65 years of age or older. The gender makeup of the community was 58.6% male and 41.4% female.
