= Defiance, Iowa =

- City
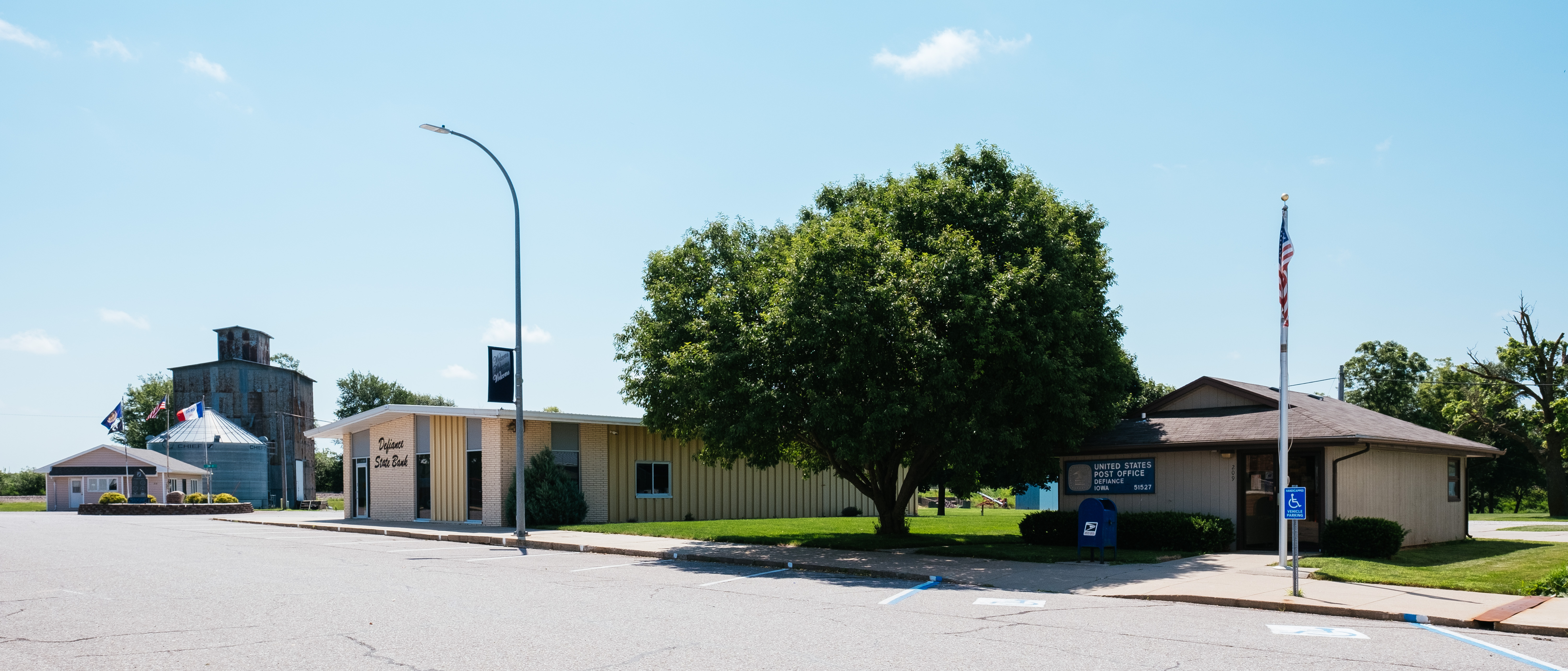
- Downtown Defiance, Iowa

- Location of Defiance, Iowa
- Coordinates: 41°49′31″N 95°20′25″W
- Country: United States
- State: Iowa
- County: Shelby

Government
  - Mayor: Jamie Goetz

Area
  - Total: 0.41 sq mi (1.05 km^{2})
  - Land: 0.41 sq mi (1.05 km^{2})
  - Water: 0 sq mi (0.00 km^{2})
- Elevation: 1,266 ft (386 m)

Population (2020)
  - Total: 245
  - Density: 604.6/sq mi (233.44/km^{2})
- Time zone: UTC-6 (Central (CST))
  - Summer (DST): UTC-5 (CDT)
- ZIP code: 51527
- Area code: 712
- FIPS code: 19-19585
- GNIS feature ID: 2394493

Defiance is a city in Shelby County, Iowa, United States, along the West Branch of the West Nishnabotna River. The population was 245 at the time of the 2020 census.

== History ==
Defiance had its start in 1882 by the building of the Chicago, Milwaukee, and St. Paul Railroad through that territory.

== Geography ==
According to the United States Census Bureau, the city has a total area of 0.39 square miles (1.01 km^{2}), all of it land.

== Demographics ==
Historical populations
| Year | Pop. | ±% |
|---|---|---|
| 1890 | 323 | — |
| 1900 | 387 | +19.8% |
| 1910 | 411 | +6.2% |
| 1920 | 389 | −5.4% |
| 1930 | 411 | +5.7% |
| 1940 | 428 | +4.1% |
| 1950 | 368 | −14.0% |
| 1960 | 386 | +4.9% |
| 1970 | 392 | +1.6% |
| 1980 | 383 | −2.3% |
| 1990 | 312 | −18.5% |
| 2000 | 346 | +10.9% |
| 2010 | 284 | −17.9% |
| 2020 | 245 | −13.7% |
Source:"U.S. Census website". United States Census Bureau. and Iowa Data Center; Source: U.S. Decennial Census

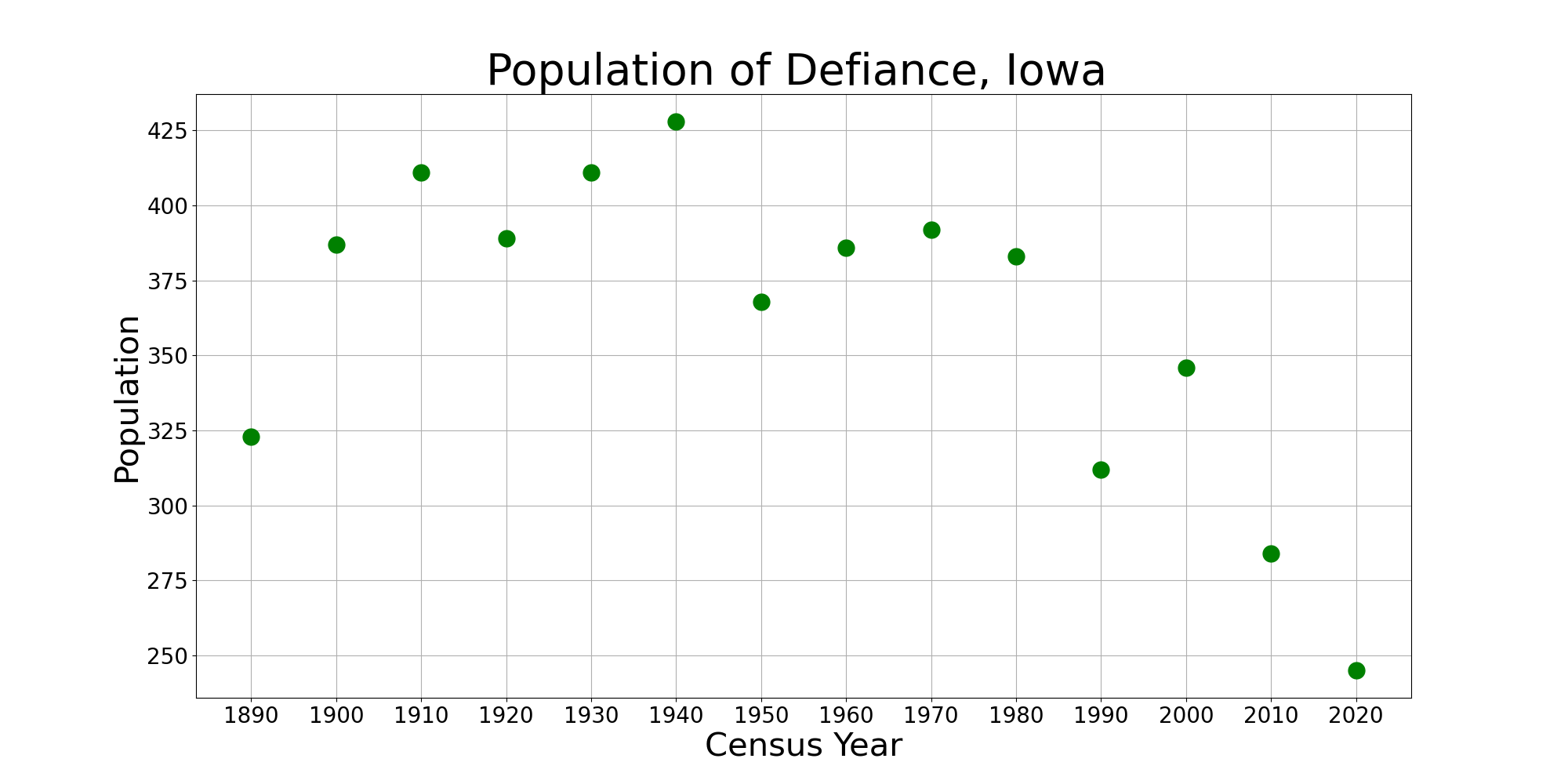
The population of Defiance, Iowa from US census data

=== 2020 census ===
As of the census of 2020, there were 245 people, 120 households, and 73 families residing in the city. The population density was 604.6 inhabitants per square mile (233.4/km^{2}). There were 128 housing units at an average density of 315.9 per square mile (122.0/km^{2}). The racial makeup of the city was 89.0% White, 0.0% Black or African American, 1.6% Native American, 0.4% Asian, 0.0% Pacific Islander, 4.1% from other races and 4.9% from two or more races. Hispanic or Latino persons of any race comprised 8.6% of the population.

Of the 120 households, 20.0% of which had children under the age of 18 living with them, 46.7% were married couples living together, 5.0% were cohabitating couples, 22.5% had a female householder with no spouse or partner present and 25.8% had a male householder with no spouse or partner present. 39.2% of all households were non-families. 35.0% of all households were made up of individuals, 16.7% had someone living alone who was 65 years old or older.

The median age in the city was 57.1 years. 18.0% of the residents were under the age of 20; 2.4% were between the ages of 20 and 24; 16.7% were from 25 and 44; 36.7% were from 45 and 64; and 26.1% were 65 years of age or older. The gender makeup of the city was 53.1% male and 46.9% female.

=== 2010 census ===
As of the census of 2010, there were 284 people, 121 households, and 82 families residing in the city. The population density was 728.2 inhabitants per square mile (281.2/km^{2}). There were 132 housing units at an average density of 338.5 per square mile (130.7/km^{2}). The racial makeup of the city was 98.9% White, 0.4% Native American, 0.4% Asian, and 0.4% from other races. Hispanic or Latino of any race were 1.4% of the population.

There were 121 households, of which 25.6% had children under the age of 18 living with them, 61.2% were married couples living together, 3.3% had a female householder with no husband present, 3.3% had a male householder with no wife present, and 32.2% were non-families. 28.9% of all households were made up of individuals, and 10.8% had someone living alone who was 65 years of age or older. The average household size was 2.35 and the average family size was 2.90.

The median age in the city was 47.8 years. 23.6% of residents were under the age of 18; 4.2% were between the ages of 18 and 24; 17.3% were from 25 to 44; 38.8% were from 45 to 64; and 16.2% were 65 years of age or older. The gender makeup of the city was 51.1% male and 48.9% female.

=== 2000 census ===
As of the census of 2000, there were 346 people, 125 households, and 98 families residing in the city. The population density was 868.9 inhabitants per square mile (335.5/km^{2}). There were 131 housing units at an average density of 329.0 per square mile (127.0/km^{2}). The racial makeup of the city was 95.95% White, 1.16% Native American, 2.89% from other races. Hispanic or Latino of any race were 2.89% of the population.

There were 125 households, out of which 40.0% had children under the age of 18 living with them, 69.6% were married couples living together, 8.0% had a female householder with no husband present, and 20.8% were non-families. 19.2% of all households were made up of individuals, and 8.8% had someone living alone who was 65 years of age or older. The average household size was 2.77 and the average family size was 3.16.

In the city, the population was spread out, with 30.9% under the age of 18, 5.2% from 18 to 24, 28.0% from 25 to 44, 22.0% from 45 to 64, and 13.9% who were 65 years of age or older. The median age was 37 years. For every 100 females, there were 106.0 males. For every 100 females age 18 and over, there were 106.0 males.

The median income for a household in the city was $36,875, and the median income for a family was $40,125. Males had a median income of $25,673 versus $18,750 for females. The per capita income for the city was $12,492. About 4.1% of families and 7.0% of the population were below the poverty line, including 6.2% of those under age 18 and 4.2% of those age 65 or over.

== Education ==
The Harlan Community School District operates local public schools. The district serves the towns of Harlan, Defiance, Earling, Panama, Portsmouth and Westphalia, the unincorporated communities of Jacksonville and Corley, and the surrounding rural areas.

== Notable natives ==
- C. A. Robins, 22nd governor of Idaho; born in Defiance.
