= Harlan, Iowa =

- City
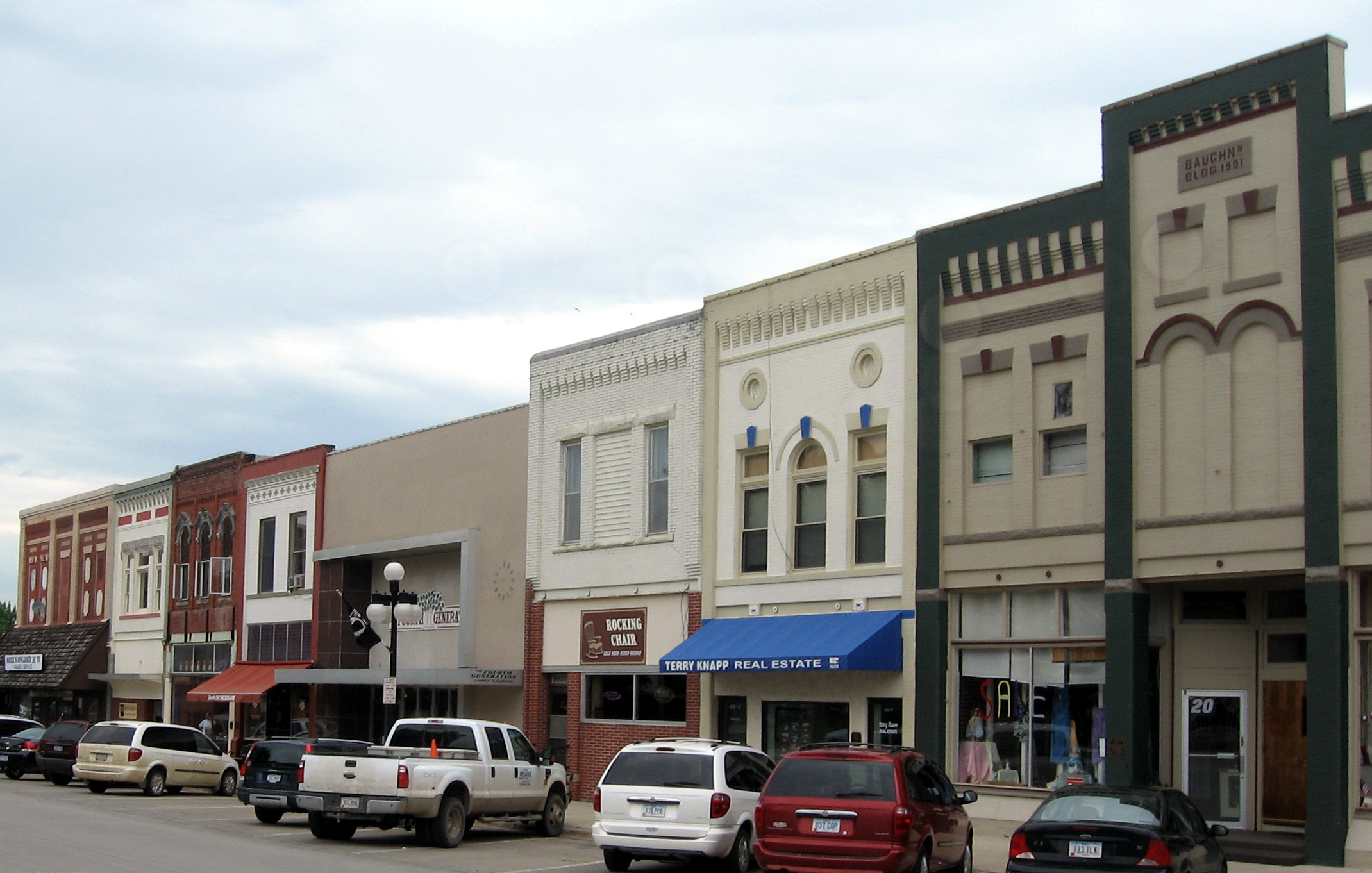
- Downtown Harlan

- Location of Harlan, Iowa
- Coordinates: 41°38′58″N 95°19′36″W
- Country: United States
- State: Iowa
- County: Shelby

Area
  - Total: 4.42 sq mi (11.45 km^{2})
  - Land: 4.42 sq mi (11.45 km^{2})
  - Water: 0 sq mi (0.00 km^{2})
- Elevation: 1,273 ft (388 m)

Population (2020)
  - Total: 4,893
  - Density: 1,107.2/sq mi (427.48/km^{2})
- Time zone: UTC-6 (Central (CST))
  - Summer (DST): UTC-5 (CDT)
- ZIP codes: 51537, 51593
- Area code: 712
- FIPS code: 19-34500
- GNIS feature ID: 468007
- Website: www.cityofharlan.com

Harlan is a city in and the county seat of Shelby County, Iowa, along the West Nishnabotna River. The population was 4,893 at the time of the 2020 census.

== History ==
Harlan was platted in 1858. It was named for one of Iowa's early U.S. Senators, James Harlan. Harlan was designated county seat in 1859. The town was incorporated on May 2, 1879.

On April 26, 2024, a multiple-vortex EF3 tornado tracked west of Harlan during a major regional outbreak. Although ground-level damage assessments supported a maximum intensity rating of EF3 with 160 miles (260 km) per hour winds, a mobile Doppler on Wheels (DOW) radar unit scanning the storm near Harlan measured winds aloft reaching roughly 224 miles (360 km) per hour: an intensity equivalent to an EF5 tornado. The storm severely damaged on rural farmsteads across Shelby County before finally dissipating.

== Geography ==
According to the United States Census Bureau, the city has a total area of 4.39 square miles (11.37 km^{2}), all of it land.

=== Climate ===
Climate data for Harlan, Iowa, 1991–2020 normals, extremes 1899–2016
Month	Jan	Feb	Mar	Apr	May	Jun	Jul	Aug	Sep	Oct	Nov	Dec	Year
Record high °F (°C)	68 (20)	71 (22)	90 (32)	94 (34)	106 (41)	107 (42)	114 (46)	111 (44)	106 (41)	94 (34)	80 (27)	68 (20)	114 (46)
Mean maximum °F (°C)	51.5 (10.8)	57.5 (14.2)	73.3 (22.9)	85.3 (29.6)	88.8 (31.6)	93.4 (34.1)	94.4 (34.7)	93.4 (34.1)	89.9 (32.2)	82.5 (28.1)	68.2 (20.1)	53.0 (11.7)	96.5 (35.8)
Mean daily maximum °F (°C)	30.7 (−0.7)	35.7 (2.1)	49.9 (9.9)	63.3 (17.4)	74.1 (23.4)	83.6 (28.7)	85.9 (29.9)	84.0 (28.9)	78.5 (25.8)	65.4 (18.6)	49.3 (9.6)	35.9 (2.2)	61.4 (16.3)
Daily mean °F (°C)	20.5 (−6.4)	24.7 (−4.1)	37.6 (3.1)	49.8 (9.9)	61.7 (16.5)	71.7 (22.1)	74.7 (23.7)	72.4 (22.4)	65.1 (18.4)	52.2 (11.2)	37.6 (3.1)	25.8 (−3.4)	49.5 (9.7)
Mean daily minimum °F (°C)	10.3 (−12.1)	13.7 (−10.2)	25.3 (−3.7)	36.4 (2.4)	49.3 (9.6)	59.9 (15.5)	63.6 (17.6)	60.8 (16.0)	51.7 (10.9)	39.1 (3.9)	25.9 (−3.4)	15.7 (−9.1)	37.6 (3.1)
Mean minimum °F (°C)	−10.1 (−23.4)	−7.4 (−21.9)	5.9 (−14.5)	21.1 (−6.1)	35.7 (2.1)	46.9 (8.3)	51.7 (10.9)	49.7 (9.8)	34.9 (1.6)	22.9 (−5.1)	9.1 (−12.7)	−6.5 (−21.4)	−16.1 (−26.7)
Record low °F (°C)	−37 (−38)	−37 (−38)	−23 (−31)	2 (−17)	18 (−8)	31 (−1)	40 (4)	35 (2)	20 (−7)	0 (−18)	−16 (−27)	−27 (−33)	−37 (−38)
Average precipitation inches (mm)	0.90 (23)	0.98 (25)	2.05 (52)	3.34 (85)	4.74 (120)	5.17 (131)	3.72 (94)	4.32 (110)	4.00 (102)	2.37 (60)	1.43 (36)	1.31 (33)	34.33 (871)
Average snowfall inches (cm)	7.6 (19)	7.6 (19)	4.0 (10)	1.5 (3.8)	0.0 (0.0)	0.0 (0.0)	0.0 (0.0)	0.0 (0.0)	0.0 (0.0)	0.9 (2.3)	2.2 (5.6)	6.7 (17)	30.5 (76.7)
Average precipitation days (≥ 0.01 in)	5.8	6.7	7.4	10.9	12.2	11.1	8.7	8.8	7.3	7.5	5.7	6.2	98.3
Average snowy days (≥ 0.1 in)	4.6	5.0	2.1	0.9	0.0	0.0	0.0	0.0	0.0	0.3	1.8	4.4	19.1
Source 1: NOAA
Source 2: National Weather Service (mean maxima/minima 1981–2010)

== Demographics ==
Historical populations
Year	Pop.	±%
1860	47	—
1870	128	+172.3%
1880	1,304	+918.8%
1890	1,765	+35.4%
1900	2,422	+37.2%
1910	2,570	+6.1%
1920	2,831	+10.2%
1930	3,145	+11.1%
1940	3,727	+18.5%
1950	3,915	+5.0%
1960	4,350	+11.1%
1970	5,049	+16.1%
1980	5,357	+6.1%
1990	5,148	−3.9%
2000	5,282	+2.6%
2010	5,106	−3.3%
2020	4,893	−4.2%
Source:"U.S. Census website". United States Census Bureau. and Iowa Data Center; Source: U.S. Decennial Census

=== 2020 census ===
As of the 2020 census, Harlan had a population of 4,893. The median age was 45.3 years. 23.1% of residents were under the age of 18, and 24.2% were 65 years of age or older. For every 100 females there were 92.8 males, and for every 100 females age 18 and over there were 88.6 males age 18 and over. 96.3% of residents lived in urban areas, while 3.7% lived in rural areas.

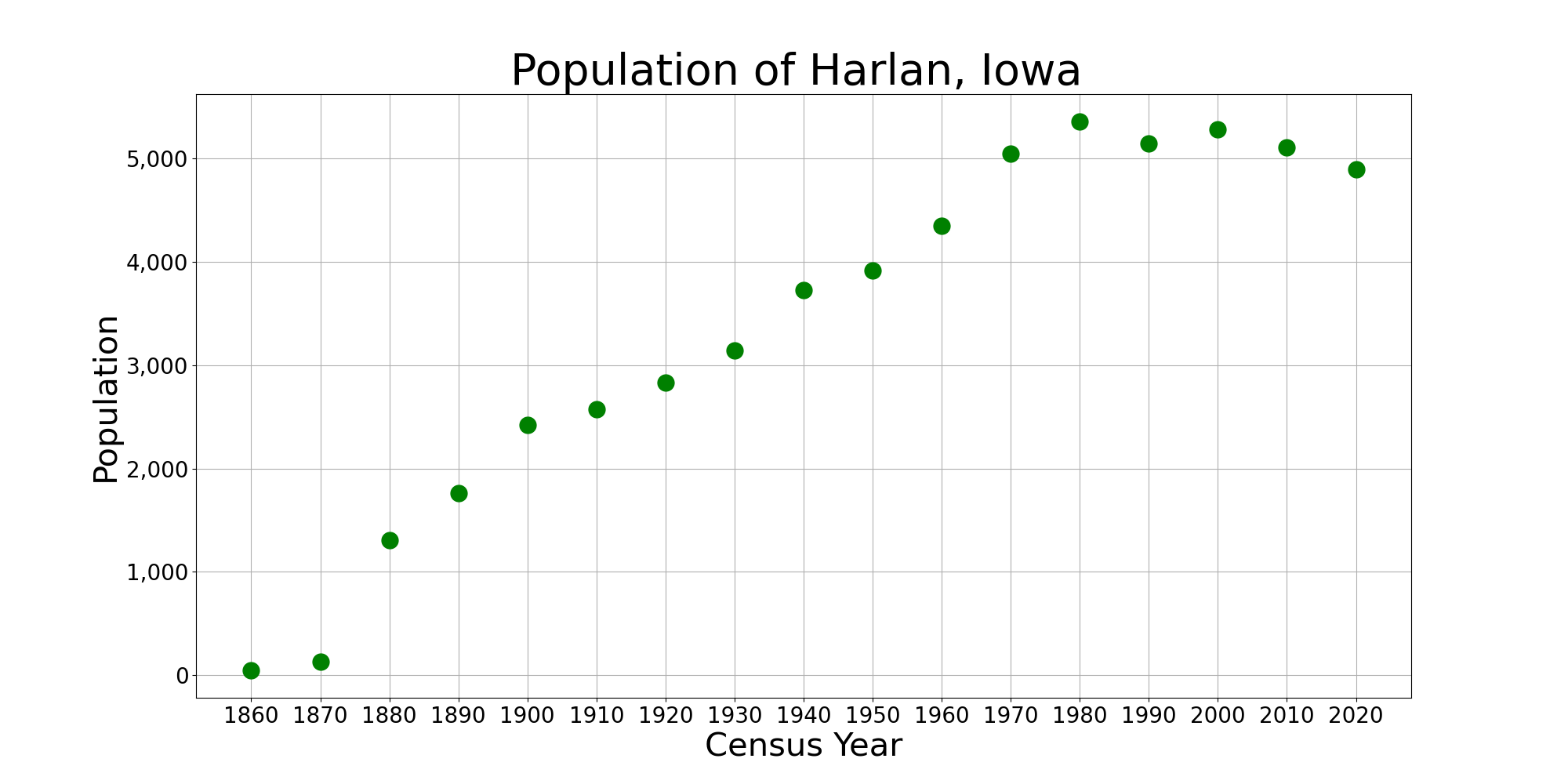
The population of Harlan, Iowa from US census data

There were 2,143 households and 1,275 families in the city. Of the households, 25.6% had children under the age of 18 living in them. Of all households, 44.4% were married-couple households, 19.6% were households with a male householder and no spouse or partner present, and 30.1% were households with a female householder and no spouse or partner present. About 35.6% of all households were made up of individuals, and 18.8% had someone living alone who was 65 years of age or older. The average household size was 2.07 and the average family size was 2.75.

There were 2,348 housing units, of which 8.7% were vacant. The homeowner vacancy rate was 2.6% and the rental vacancy rate was 11.1%. The population density was 1,111.6 inhabitants per square mile (429.2/km^{2}), and the average housing unit density was 534.9 per square mile (206.5/km^{2}).

Racial composition as of the 2020 census
Race	Number	Percent
White	4,447	90.9%
Black or African American	40	0.8%
American Indian and Alaska Native	25	0.5%
Asian	43	0.9%
Native Hawaiian and Other Pacific Islander	4	0.1%
Some other race	121	2.5%
Two or more races	213	4.4%
Hispanic or Latino (of any race)	225	4.6%

=== 2010 census ===
At the 2010 census there were 5,106 people, 2,222 households, and 1,341 families living in the city. The population density was 1,163.1 inhabitants per square mile (449.1/km^{2}). There were 2,410 housing units at an average density of 549.0 per square mile (212.0/km^{2}). The racial makeup of the city was 97.0% White, 0.5% African American, 0.4% Native American, 0.6% Asian, 0.6% from other races, and 0.9% from two or more races. Hispanic or Latino of any race were 1.9%.

Of the 2,222 households, 26.7% had children under the age of 18 living with them, 47.8% were married couples living together, 9.7% had a female householder with no husband present, 2.8% had a male householder with no wife present, and 39.6% were non-families. 34.2% of households were one person and 17.7% were one person aged 65 or older. The average household size was 2.26 and the average family size was 2.88.

The median age was 43.8 years. 23.8% of residents were under the age of 18; 6.1% were between the ages of 18 and 24; 21.4% were from 25 to 44; 27% were from 45 to 64; and 21.8% were 65 or older. The gender makeup of the city was 46.4% male and 53.6% female.

=== 2000 census ===
At the 2000 census there were 5,282 people, 2,204 households, and 1,498 families living in the city. The population density was 1,209.8 inhabitants per square mile (467.1/km^{2}). There were 2,306 housing units at an average density of 528.2 per square mile (203.9/km^{2}). The racial makeup of the city was 98.30% White, 0.08% African American, 0.30% Native American, 0.47% Asian, 0.17% from other races, and 0.68% from two or more races. Hispanic or Latino of any race were 0.62%.

Of the 2,204 households, 31.1% included children under the age of 18; 56.6% were married couples living together, 8.9% consisted of a female householder with no husband present, and 32.0% were non-families. 28.9% of households were one person and 16.3% were one person aged 65 or older. The average household size was 2.35, and the average family size was 2.88.

25.1% are under the age of 18, 6.1% from 18 to 24, 24.2% from 25 to 44, 22.4% from 45 to 64, and 22.3% 65 or older. The median age was 41 years. For every 100 females, there were 90.9 males. For every 100 females age 18 and over, there were 85.4 males.

The median household income was $35,899 and the median family income was $45,888. Males had a median income of $31,365 versus $19,671 for females. The per capita income for the city was $17,514. About 5.3% of families and 7.0% of the population were below the poverty line, including 7.3% of those under age 18 and 9.4% of those age 65 or over.

== Economy ==
A major Harlan employer is CDS Global, the Des Moines-based fulfillment house owned by the Hearst media conglomerate. Since this company provides subscription services for hundreds of periodicals, it is common to see a Harlan P.O. box as a magazine's customer service address. The biggest occupations in Harlan in the year 2024 was sales and adjacent occupations with 309 workers, followed by management occupations with 219 workers. The biggest industry in 2024 was retail trade, followed by healthcare. The median wage for men in 2024 was $56,369, and $36,178 for women.

The median household income in 2024 was $57,444 and the median property value was $154,500. The unemployed population was 2,161 and the poverty rate was 9.05%.

The largest share of car owners, approximately 37.7%, owned two cars.

== Education ==
=== Primary or secondary schools ===
Public schools in Harlan are governed and operated by the Harlan Community School District. The school district also serves residents of Jacksonville, Corley, Defiance, Panama, Portsmouth, Earling, and Westphalia. As of November 2021, the district has a student enrollment of 1,450. The district's racial demographics are 91.4% White, 5.7% Hispanic, 0.8% African American, and 2% non-white of other minorities.

The district operates four schools spread amongst two campuses, all in Harlan:

- Harlan Primary School (K-2)
- Harlan Intermediate School (3–5)
- Harlan Community Middle School (6–8)
- Harlan Community High School (9–12)

Shelby County Catholic School is a private primary and elementary school in Harlan, Iowa. A department of St Michael's Catholic Church, it is the only private school in Harlan.

== Notable people ==
- Johnny Beauchamp, NASCAR driver with two career Cup Series wins
- Mary Lincoln Beckwith, great-grandchild of Abraham Lincoln
- Howard Webster Byers, Iowa Attorney General
- Susan Christensen, Iowa Supreme Court Chief Justice
- Billy Cundiff, NFL kicker
- Zach Daeges, baseball outfielder
- George Sabin Gibbs, United States Army General
- Albert Hansen, college football coach
- Kij Johnson, author
- Greg Lansing, former Indiana State Sycamores men's basketball coach
- Jerry L. Larson, Iowa Supreme Court Justice
- Tiny Lund (1929–1975) NASCAR driver and 1963 winner of the Daytona 500
- Raymond Eugene Plummer, lawyer and judge
- Lynn Reynolds, film director

== See also ==
Building on the National Register of Historic Places

- St. Paul's Episcopal Church
- Shelby County Courthouse
