= National Register of Historic Places listings in Audubon County, Iowa =

Location of Audubon County in Iowa

This is a list of the National Register of Historic Places listings in Audubon County, Iowa.

This is intended to be a complete list of the properties and districts on the National Register of Historic Places in Audubon County, Iowa, United States. Latitude and longitude coordinates are provided for many National Register properties and districts; these locations may be seen together in a map.

There are 15 properties and districts listed on the National Register in the county.

This National Park Service list is complete through NPS recent listings posted March 21, 2025.

== Current listings ==
	Name on the Register	Image	Date listed	Location	City or town	Description
1	Audubon County Court House	Audubon County Court House	August 28, 2003 (#03000826)	318 Leroy St. 41°43′18″N 94°55′47″W	Audubon	The Audubon County Court House designed by Keffer and Jones of Des Moines in the PWA Moderne style in 1939, is significant as one of ten county courthouses built in Iowa during the New Deal Era as part of the federal Public Works Administration.
2	Audubon County Courthouse	Audubon County Courthouse	July 26, 1977 (#77000493)	Washington and Kilworth Sts. 41°35′29″N 94°52′30″W	Exira	Served as the Audubon County Courthouse from 1874 to 1879, and is the first building erected in the county specifically for use as a county government facility. In 1887, Knights of Pythias Lodge took over the rent, and rented the lower floor to travelling musical and theater troupes, and later to entrepreneurs who showed silent movies. Community plays and dances were also held here.
3	Audubon County Home Historic District	Audubon County Home Historic District	March 17, 2015 (#15000080)	1891 215th St. 41°41′44″N 94°55′21″W	Audubon	
4	Bennedsen, Boldt, and Hansen Building		October 3, 1991 (#91001460)	Main St. 41°37′42″N 95°04′21″W	Kimballton	1913 commercial building, built by Danish immigrant settlers.
5	Bethany Danish Evangelical Lutheran Church		October 3, 1991 (#91001457)	1.5 miles north of Iowa Highway 44 and 1 mile east of Iowa Highway 68; 41°39′08″N 95°03′11″W	Kimballton	1898 church significant for its association with an important United Church congregation following the split in the Danish Lutheran Church in 1894.
6	John D. Bush House	John D. Bush House	October 3, 1991 (#91001461)	219 N. Kilworth; 41°35′39″N 94°52′32″W	Exira	1873 Gabled-ell house built by Danish immigrant carpenter Jens Uriah Hansen, who was the first Dane to settle in the county.
7	Andrew P. Hansen Farmstead		October 3, 1991 (#91001458)	Between Iowa Highway 44 and County Road P58 on Little Elkhorn Creek; 41°36′01″N 94°59′06″W	Brayton	1894 farmstead including a hipped foursquare house built by Danish immigrants
8	Immanuel Danish Evangelical Lutheran Church	Immanuel Danish Evangelical Lutheran Church	October 3, 1991 (#91001462)	Eastern side of W. 2nd St. 41°37′46″N 95°04′28″W	Kimballton	Gothic and Queen Anne styled church built by Danish immigrants significant for its association with the Grundtvigian synod of the Danish Lutheran Church following the historic split within the church in 1894.
9	Hans J. Jorgensen Barn	Hans J. Jorgensen Barn	October 3, 1991 (#91001452)	Junction of Iowa Highway 44 and Main St. 41°37′55″N 95°04′25″W	Kimballton	Square hipped barn with a distinctive pyramidal roofs built by Danish Immigrant settler Hans J. Jorgesen, an instrumental person in the growth of the community of Kimballton.
10	Kimballton Commercial District	Kimballton Commercial District	August 18, 1995 (#95001016)	Junction of Alfred and Main Sts. 41°37′44″N 95°04′22″W	Kimballton	1889-1940 commercial buildings, significant for their influence of the Danish immigrant and Danish American craftmanship.
11	Kimballton West 2nd – West 3rd Street Residential District	Kimballton West 2nd – West 3rd Street Residential District	August 18, 1995 (#95001017)	Roughly W. 2nd St. from Iowa Highway 44 to south of Odense St. and W. 3rd St. from Iowa Highway 44 to Esbeck St. 41°37′43″N 95°04′32″W	Kimballton	Residential neighborhood with late 19th & 20th Century homes including Queen Anne, Colonial Revival, Prairie School, and Craftsman styles.
12	Hans M. Koch House		October 3, 1991 (#91001453)	Western side of Iowa Highway 173, 0.5 miles south of Kimballton; 41°37′12″N 95°04′25″W	Kimballton	A 1908 gabled double-pile home built to serve as the manager's residence for the Crystal Springs brickworks.
13	Jens T. Larsen House		October 3, 1991 (#91001451)	103 Main St. 41°37′37″N 95°04′23″W	Kimballton	1894 gabled ell house, a unique example of skilled Danish immigrant craftsmen, Anders and Thorvald Jensen.
14	Poplar Rural District		April 9, 1992 (#91001463)	Roughly the area from Poplar south and west to Wolf Creek; 41°40′28″N 95°06′29″W	Jacksonville	Danish rural farming community of the largest rural Danish immigrant settlement in Iowa and the United States, with the district still appearing much as it did during the early 1900s.
15	Ross Grain Elevator		June 20, 2018 (#100002575)	5940 Main St. 41°46′25″N 94°55′20″W	Audubon	

== See also ==
- List of National Historic Landmarks in Iowa
- National Register of Historic Places listings in Iowa
- Listings in neighboring counties: Carroll, Cass, Guthrie, Shelby
