= Andrew P. Hansen Farmstead =

- U.S. National Register of Historic Places
- Location within Iowa Location within the United States
- Location: Between Iowa Highway 44 and County Road P58 on Little Elkhorn Creek
- Nearest city: Brayton, Iowa
- Coordinates: 41°36′01″N 94°59′06″W
- Area: 8.61 acres (3.48 ha)
- MPS: Ethnic Historic Settlement of Shelby and Audubon Counties MPS
- NRHP reference No.: 91001458
- Added to NRHP: October 3, 1991

The Andrew P. Hansen Farmstead is a collection of historic domestic and agricultural buildings located northwest of Brayton, Iowa, United States. Hansen was born in Fyn, Denmark, and was five years old when the family immigrated to the United States, settling in Avoca, Iowa. He worked for the Chicago, Rock Island and Pacific Railroad there before buying his first 40 acres (16 ha) from the railroad. The farm eventually grew to 120 acres (49 ha).

It was listed on the National Register of Historic Places in 1991. At the time of its nomination the farm included five contributing buildings including the transverse-frame dairy barn (1894), the hog house (c. 1895), the 1½-story American Foursquare house (1901), the Midwest three portal cattle barn (1903), and a garage (1910s). It also includes one contributing structure, the double corn crib (c. 1912–1913). The house and the barns are characteristic of the building trends that are associated with Danish immigrants during the period of significance, in this case 1894–1924.
