= Kimballton West 2nd – West 3rd Street Residential District =

Historic district in Iowa, United States

- U.S. National Register of Historic Places
- U.S. Historic district
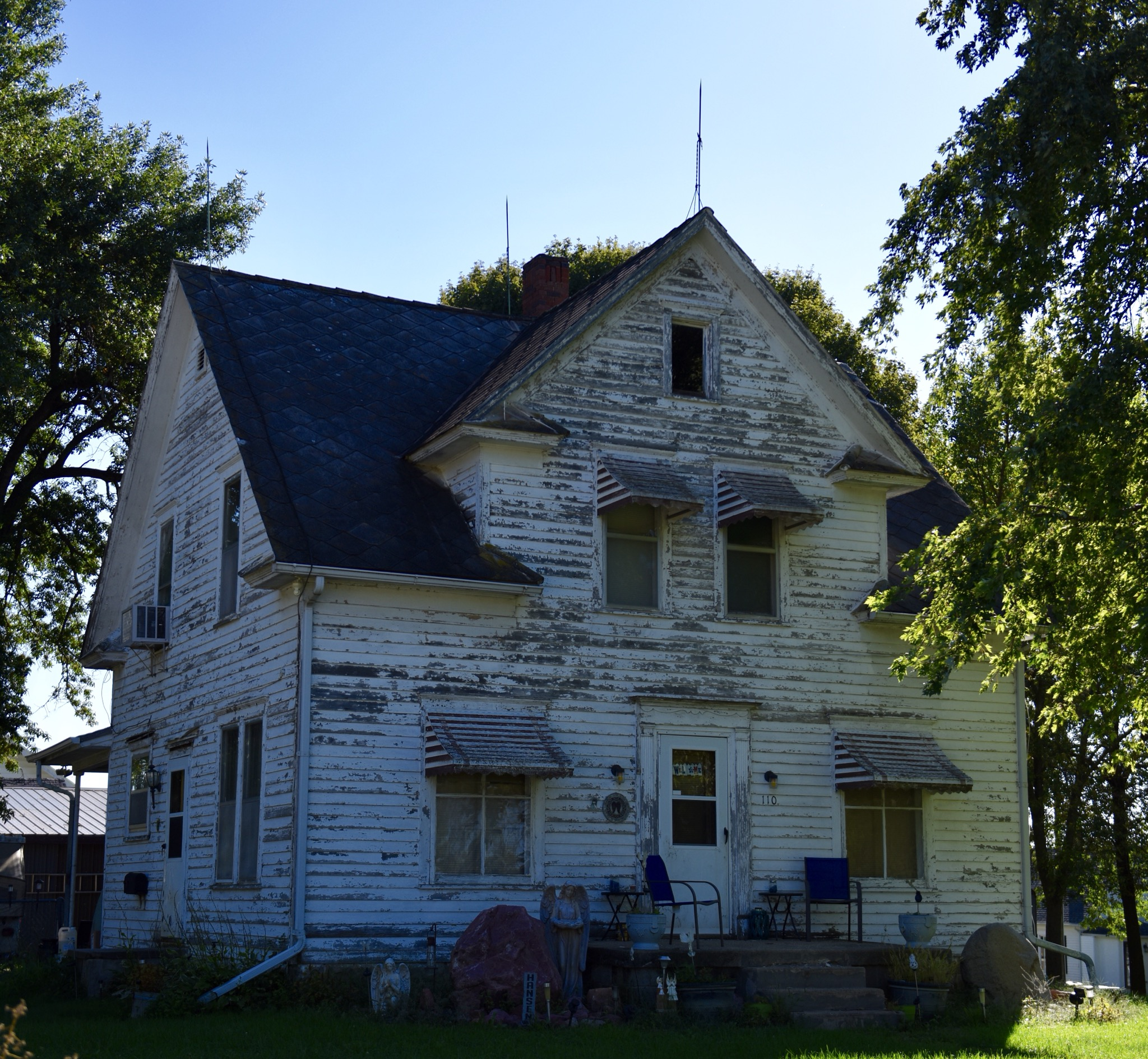
- 110 W 2nd St.

- Location within Iowa Location within the United States
- Location: Roughly W. 2nd St. from Iowa Highway 44 to south of Odense St. and W. 3rd St. from Iowa Highway 44 to Esbeck St., Kimballton, Iowa
- Coordinates: 41°37′43″N 95°04′32″W
- Area: 19.2 acres (7.8 ha)
- Architects: Hans P. Boldt, et al.
- Architectural style: Gothic Revival; Queen Anne
- MPS: Ethnic Historic Settlement of Shelby and Audubon Counties MPS
- NRHP reference No.: 95001017
- Added to NRHP: August 18, 1995

The Kimballton West 2nd – West 3rd Street Residential District is a nationally recognized historic district located in Kimballton, Iowa, United States. It was listed on the National Register of Historic Places in 1995. At the time of its nomination the district consisted of 82 resources, including 26 contributing buildings, 11 contributing objects, and 27 non-contributing buildings. The district mostly contains houses and outbuildings associated with the dwellings. They are all frame construction with locally produced brick, clay tile block, or concrete block foundations. Most of the lots are large the house size is a matter of taste or preference. For the most part the houses are 1½-stories, but there are also single-story and two-story structures. Residential architectural styles in the district include Queen Anne, Colonial Revival, and American Craftsman. There are no high style examples in the district. The frame, Gothic Revival, Immanuel Lutheran Church (1904) is located on Second Street, and is individually listed on the National Register.

Kimballton's growth was first spurred by a division in the Danish Lutheran Church in the United States. A Grundtvigian congregation was established in town and that drew people here. The residential area that is the subject of this historic district was platted after the Atlantic Northern Railroad came to town in 1907. The town itself was incorporated the following year. The first house was built in the district in 1895, but it has subsequently been torn down. The oldest extant house dates from 1907, and a total of 27 dwellings (77%) were built in the economic boom years after the railroad arrived (1907-1918). Five houses were built in the 1920s for Danish immigrants who retired here from their farms, and another house was moved in for a retiree. That trend continued after 1940 as well.
