= Hans J. Jorgensen Barn =

- U.S. National Register of Historic Places
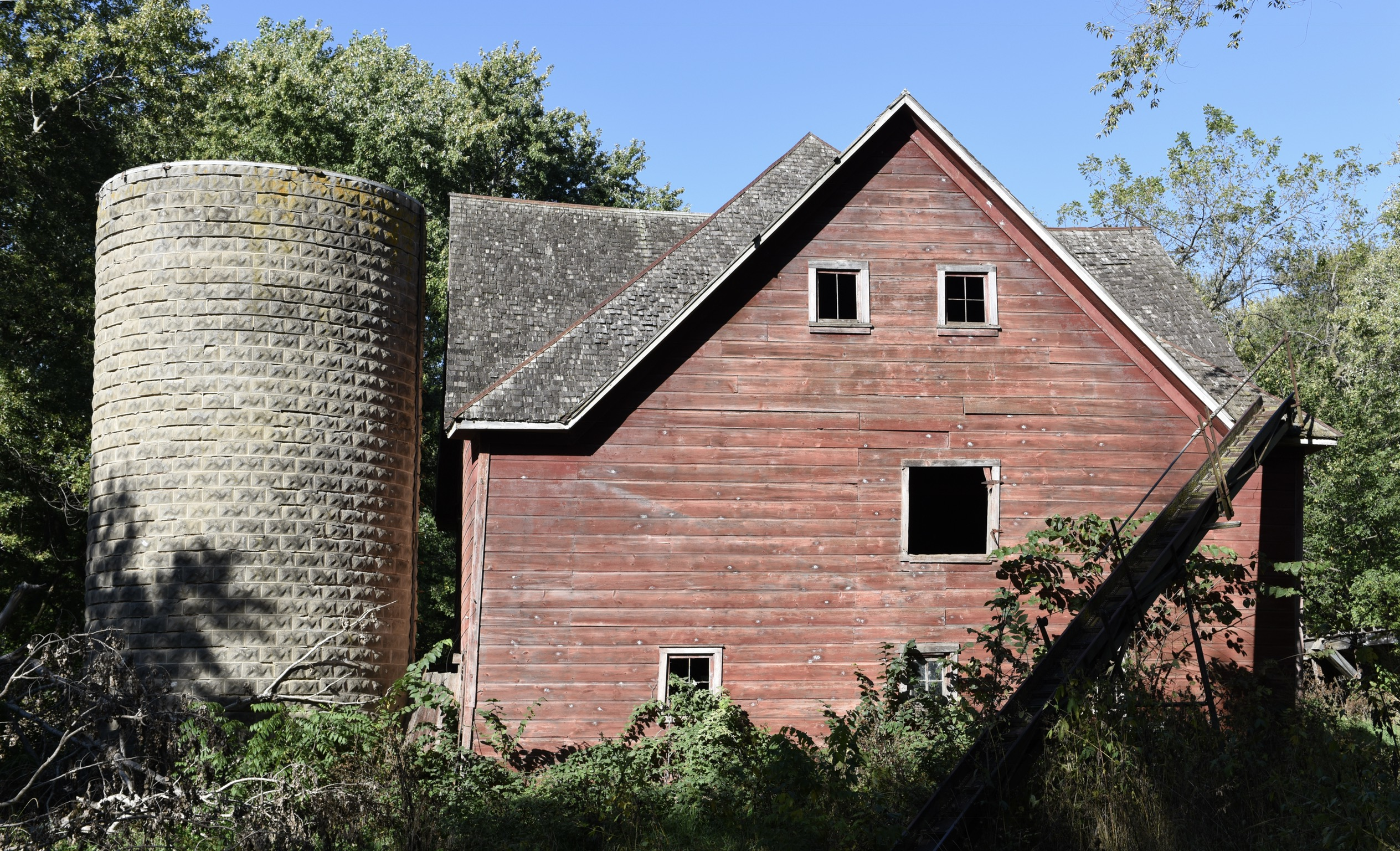

- Location within Iowa Location within the United States
- Location: Junction of Iowa Highway 44 and Main St., Kimballton, Iowa
- Coordinates: 41°37′55″N 95°04′25″W
- Area: Less than one acre
- Built: 1908
- Built by: Hans J. Jorgensen
- MPS: Ethnic Historic Settlement of Shelby and Audubon Counties MPS
- NRHP reference No.: 91001452
- Added to NRHP: October 3, 1991

Hans J. Jorgensen Barn is a historic building located in Kimballton, Iowa, United States. Its significance is derived from its association with Jorgensen, who was the instrumental in the founding and early growth of the town, a Danish immigrant community. The barn is a pyramidal roof variant of the Square Hipped Roof Barn. Built in 1908, it is the only barn of this type that remains in the Danish Settlement area. The concrete blocks used for its foundation and the adjacent silo, which are part of this historic nomination, were locally produced in a Danish-influenced industry. This two-story heavy-timber structure utilized mortise and tenon construction for the animal stalls and supports for the hay loft. The barn was listed on the National Register of Historic Places in 1991.
