= Hans M. Koch House =

Historic house in Iowa, United States

- U.S. National Register of Historic Places
- Location within Iowa Location within the United States
- Location: Western side of Iowa Highway 173, 0.5 miles south of Kimballton
- Coordinates: 41°37′12″N 95°04′25″W
- Area: Less than one acre
- Built: 1908
- Built by: Hans Mikkelsen Koch
- MPS: Ethnic Historic Settlement of Shelby and Audubon Counties MPS
- NRHP reference No.: 91001453
- Added to NRHP: October 3, 1991

The Hans M. Koch House, also known as the Brickyard Residence, is a historic building located in the extreme southern portion of Kimballton, Iowa, United States. Its significance is derived from its association with the Danish immigrant settlement of the area, and the skilled Danish craftsman who lived and worked here. The house was the work of its owner, Hans Koch, who was also the manager of the Crystals Springs brickyard nearby. He was a native of Slesvig, Denmark and immigrated to the United States twice. He first settled in Michigan in 1893 before returning to Denmark four years later. He immigrated a second time in 1908 settling in Kimballton. He worked as a brickmaker everywhere he lived. Built in 1908, the 1½-story brick structure is a gabled double-pile house type, which was common in the Danish settlement area of Shelby and Audubon counties in the early 20th century. It may also be an example of a Danish house form. It was listed on the National Register of Historic Places in 1991.
