= Former Audubon County Courthouse =

- Audubon County Courthouse
- U.S. National Register of Historic Places
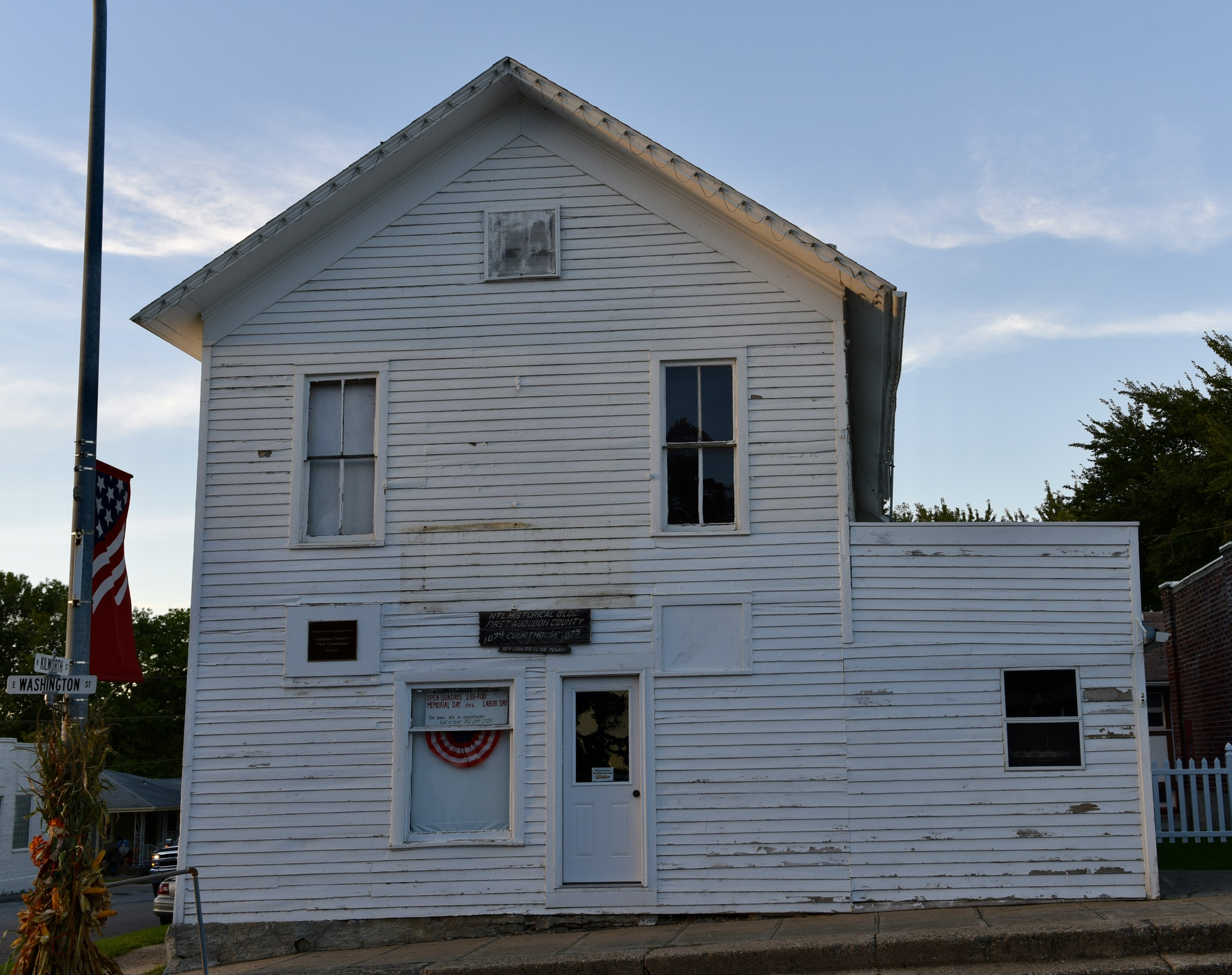

- Location within Iowa Location within the United States
- Location: Washington and Kilworth Sts. Exira, Iowa
- Coordinates: 41°35′29″N 94°52′30″W
- Area: Less than one acre
- Built: 1874
- NRHP reference No.: 77000493
- Added to NRHP: July 26, 1977

The Former Audubon County Courthouse, also known as the Audubon County Historical Society Museum, is a historic building located in Exira, Iowa, United States. Court proceedings were first held in a schoolhouse in Hamlin's Grove after Audubon County was established in 1851. The county seat was relocated to Exira ten years later, and a disagreement erupted over where the county seat should be located. The county board of supervisors made an appropriation for a new courthouse in 1871, but its construction was delayed due to the disagreement. Exira eventually won and officials constructed the courthouse for about $2,200. The Exira Hall Company was established to build the two-story, frame structure. County offices were located on the first floor and the courtroom was located on the second floor. The county seat was moved to Audubon in 1879.

It is unknown what the building was used for between 1879 and 1887 when the local Knights of Pythias lodge took over the rent and later acquired the title. The second floor was used for the lodge. The building's name was changed to the Opera House when the first floor was rented out to travelling musical and theater groups, and Chautauquas. The first silent movies were also shown in the hall. The first floor had a seating capacity of nearly 400. Other uses for the building have included the town's first library, a bakery, restaurant, cafe, an outreach center, as well as other uses. The Audubon County Historical Society eventually acquired the building for use as a museum. It was listed on the National Register of Historic Places in 1977.
