= Poplar, Iowa =

- Unincorporated community
- Location within Iowa
- Coordinates: 41°41′20″N 95°05′33″W
- Country: United States
- State: Iowa
- County: Audubon
- Elevation: 1,450 ft (440 m)
- Time zone: UTC-6 (Central (CST))
  - Summer (DST): UTC-5 (CDT)
- Area code: 712
- GNIS feature ID: 1994807

Poplar is a rural unincorporated community in Audubon County, Iowa, in the United States. It is part of the Poplar Rural District which is recognized as a rural historic district and was the largest rural settlement of Danish immigrants in the United States.

Poplar lies west of the town of Audubon near the border of Shelby County.

== History ==
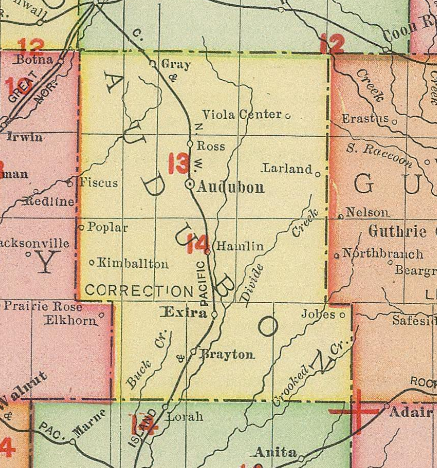
Poplar appears on the 1903 Rand McNally State of Iowa map.

The area was settled primarily by Danish immigrants. A post office was established in Poplar in 1893, and remained in operation until it was discontinued in 1903.

It also had a general store. A plan to lay out streets and potentially incorporate in 1902 never materialized. Poplar's population was 17 in 1925. The population was 14 in 1940.

Annual reunions of past and present residents of Poplar have occurred in recent years.
