= Kimballton Commercial District =

Historic district in Iowa, United States

- U.S. National Register of Historic Places
- U.S. Historic district
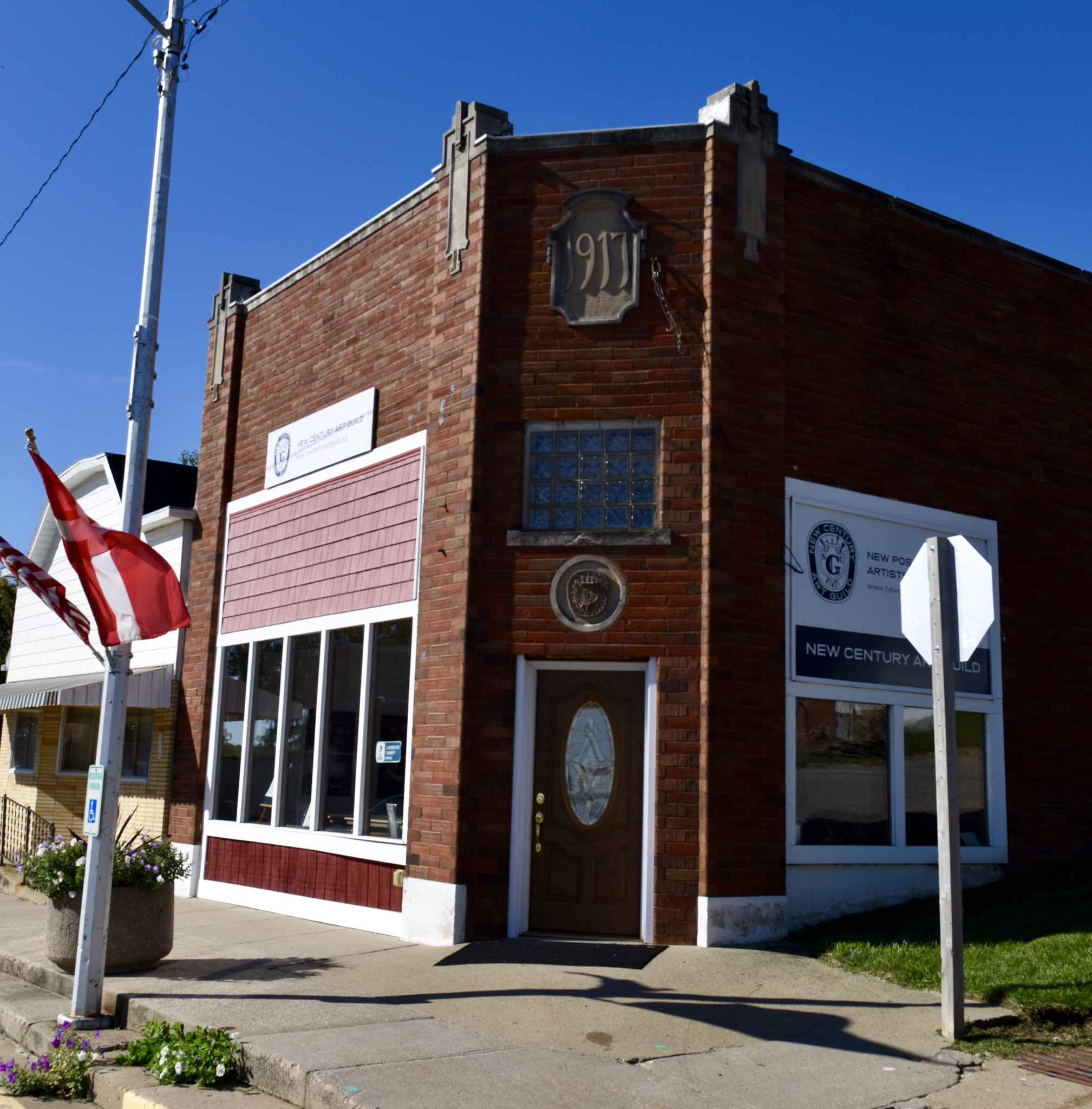
- New Century Art Guild

- Location within Iowa Location within the United States
- Location: Junction of Alfred and Main Sts., Kimballton, Iowa
- Coordinates: 41°37′44″N 95°04′22″W
- Area: 6 acres (2.4 ha)
- Architect: T.G. Jensen et al.
- Architectural style: Italianate; Romanesque Revival; Queen Anne
- MPS: Ethnic Historic Settlement of Shelby and Audubon Counties MPS
- NRHP reference No.: 95001016
- Added to NRHP: August 18, 1995

The Kimballton Commercial District is a nationally recognized historic district located in Kimballton, Iowa, United States. It was listed on the National Register of Historic Places in 1995. At the time of its nomination the district consisted of 34 resources, including 26 contributing buildings and 8 non-contributing buildings. The district covers parts of four blocks of the central business district. The commercial buildings are mostly masonry structures constructed with locally produced bricks and concrete blocks. Eleven of the buildings are frame construction. The buildings are from one to two stories in height, and Late Victorian architectural styles dominate. Because of the hilly terrain, buildings on one side of Main Street have exposed basements, while those on the other side of street are built into the side of a hill. The Bennedsen, Boldt, and Hansen Building is individually listed on the National Register.

Danish immigrants were central to settling the town. Decorative elements that call attention to the Danish presence include scalloped concrete cornice moldings on three of the buildings, and a swastika that decorated a bank building at one time. The arrival of the Atlantic Northern Railroad in 1908 lead to brief period of economic expansion in the town that culminated in a peak in commercial building construction in 1918. An agricultural depression in the 1920s and decline in rail usage for transporting goods to and from the area led to a general decline in the town. For the most part the older buildings were maintained rather than new construction. The town hall, however, was built in 1942 by the Works Progress Administration to replace the opera house, which had been torn down.
