= Elmer Carlson =

American cornhusking champion and entrepreneur

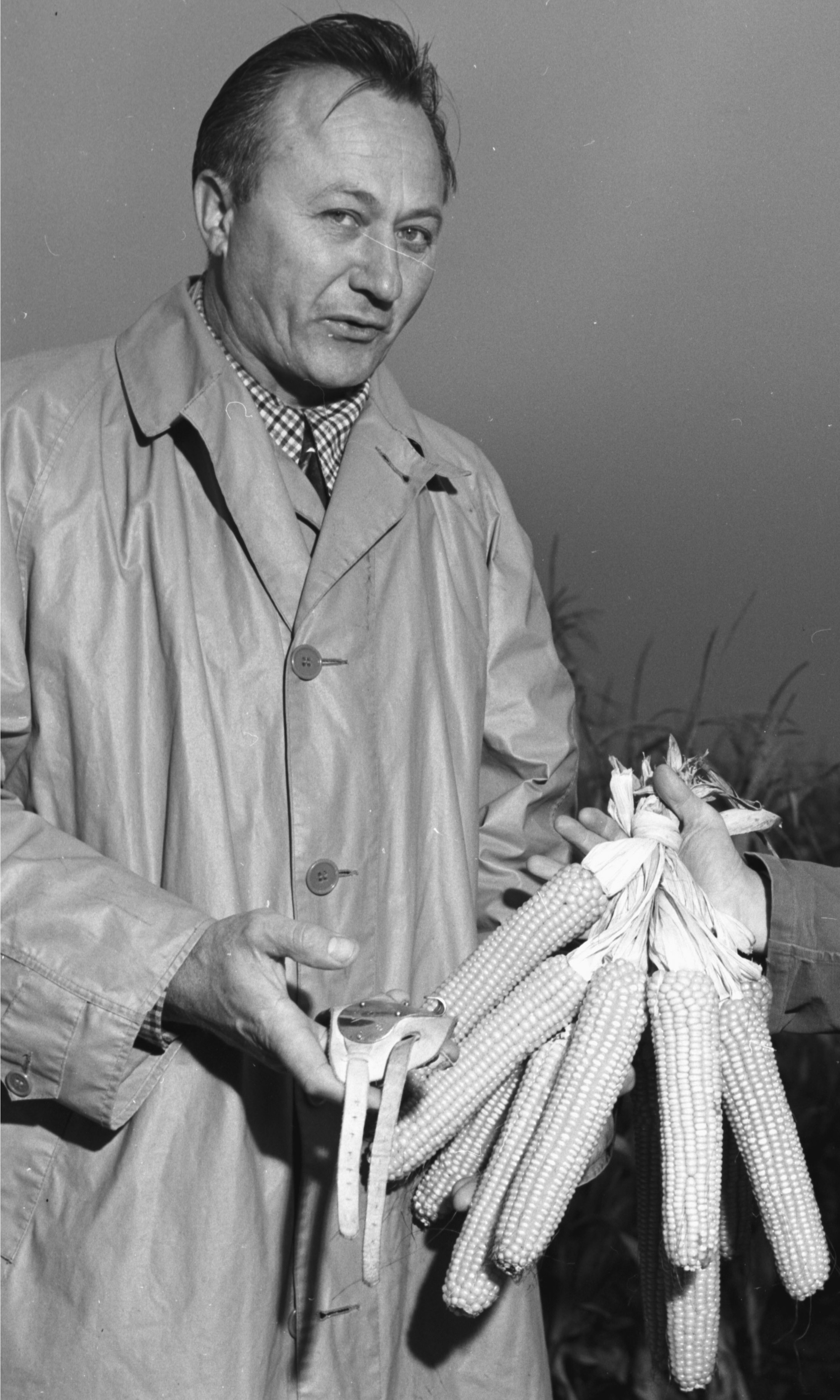
- Carlson during a corn husking demonstration in 1948
- Born: April 24, 1909 near Massena, Iowa, U.S.
- Died: June 9, 2005 (aged 96); Audubon, Iowa, U.S.
- Occupation: Company founder

Elmer Carlson (April 24, 1909 – June 9, 2005) was an American cornhusking champion and founder of a hybrid corn company, among others. He was known to do elaborate actions at National Democratic Conventions, including bringing a roller-skating mule to the convention. During the summer of 1988, he paid for Hopi Native Americans from Arizona to travel to Audubon County, Iowa, to perform a rain dance at a baseball field which allegedly caused rain.

== Personal life ==
Carlson was born on April 24, 1909, near Massena, Iowa. He became a national cornhusking champion in 1935 in an Attica, Indiana, competition. He participated in the competition with no shirt on which was considered unusual. After winning, President Harry Truman had Carlson teach modern agriculture to European farmers. His brother Carl won the contest in 1936. Carlson died on June 9, 2005, in Audubon.

== Career ==
Carlson founded the Carlson Hybrid Seed Corn Company and named the product "Carlson's Champion Hybrid Corn". In the 1950s, Carlson advertised a new sway-backed hog breed named Wessex Saddleback, and Wallaces Farmer criticized the hogs as being sold at high prices by Carlson and others. Carlson sued Wallaces Farmer for libel and was paid an out-of-court settlement. A "Hired Hand" radio show was on 18 radio stations in 1953, in which the winner had Carlson work on their farm duties for a day.

In 1952, Carlson was the National Democratic Convention delegate in Chicago, and he came to the event dressed in farmer-bibbed overalls while bringing a donkey into a hotel. At the 1964 Democratic National Convention, after Lyndon B. Johnson received a nomination, Carlson brought a roller-skating mule to the convention. When Jimmy Carter became the first farmer as President since Thomas Jefferson, Carlson paid for three parties in a row in January 1977 as the founder of the Farmers of Iowa Inaugural Committee. The inaugural parties caused Carlson to lose a 170-acre farm, and Carter did not attend any of the parties. After the American Agriculture Movement started in the late 1970s, Carlson started a short-running monthly tabloid titled Farm Strike of which he served as editor. During the same time, the county sheriff seized Carlson's Lincoln Town Car due to Carlson not paying a $10,500 judgement from the National Farmers Organization. In 1979, Carlson was sued for $415,000 based on a claim that he infringed on a French invention that transformed corn cobs, corn stalks, and crop wastes into vehicle fuel.

During the summer of 1988, he paid for Hopi Native Americans from Arizona to travel to Audubon County, Iowa, to perform a rain dance at a baseball field. The rain dance was not filmed due to Carlson saying that it was "a sacred, religious ceremony and not a freakish rain-making sideshow". According to the Audubon Advocate, three inches of rain fell during the rain dance. Carlson started Carlson Trucking, was the publisher of the Audubon News-Guide, created Circle Drive in Audubon, and worked on multiple farms.
