= Immanuel Danish Evangelical Lutheran Church =

- U.S. National Register of Historic Places
- U.S. Historic district – Contributing property
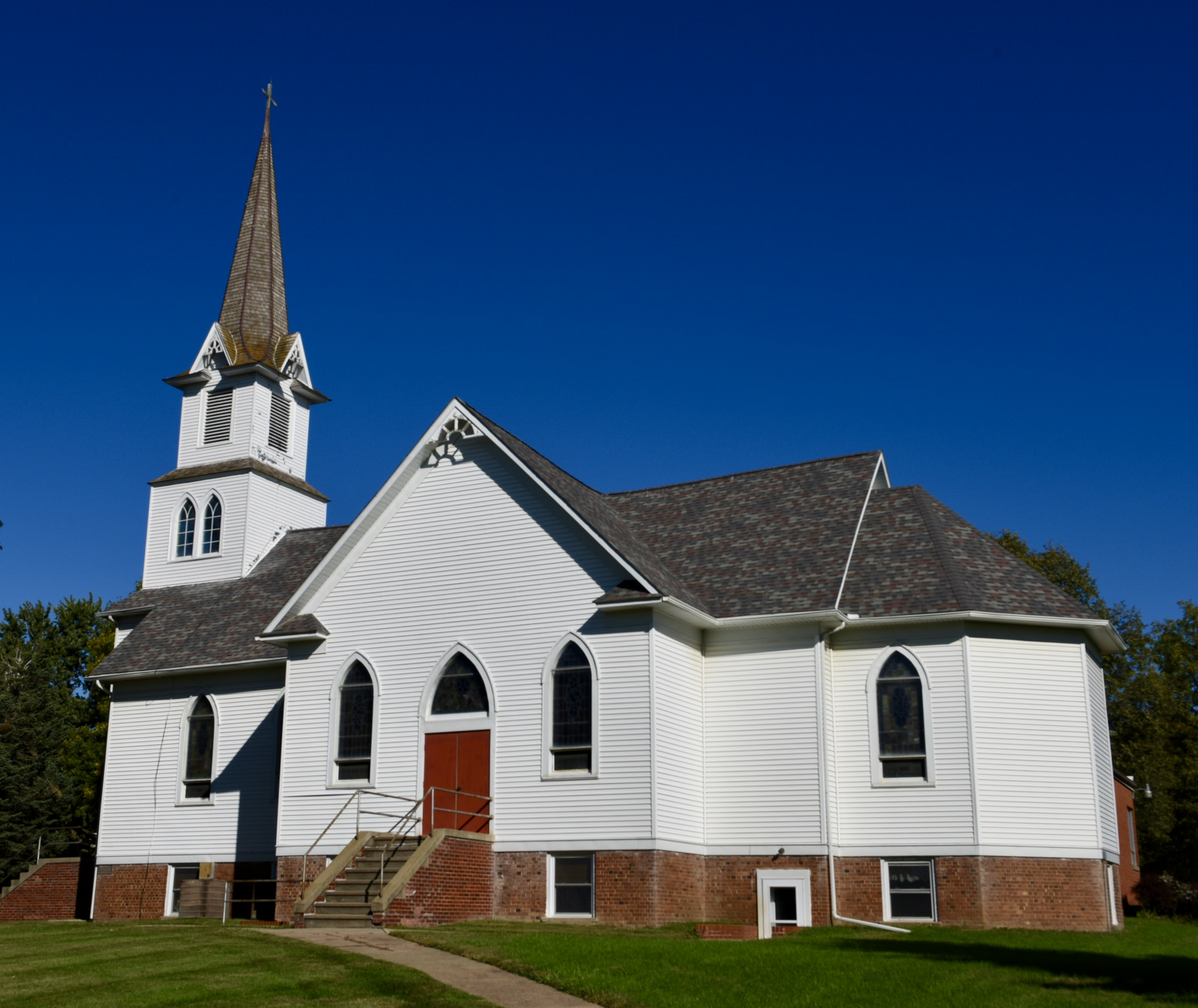

- Location within Iowa Location within the United States
- Location: W. Second St., E. side, Kimballton, Iowa
- Coordinates: 41°37′45.75″N 95°4′28.25″W
- Area: 2.1 acres (0.85 ha)
- Built: 1904
- Built by: Hansen, Niels; Rasmussen, Jens
- Architectural style: Gothic, Queen Anne
- Part of: Kimballton West 2nd – West 3rd Street Residential District (ID95001017)
- MPS: Ethnic Historic Settlement of Shelby and Audubon Counties MPS
- NRHP reference No.: 91001462
- Added to NRHP: October 3, 1991

Immanuel Danish Evangelical Lutheran Church is a historic church on W. Second Street in Kimballton, in Audubon County, Iowa. It was built in 1904 and was added to the National Register in 1991. Four years later it was included as a contributing property in the Kimballton West 2nd – West 3rd Street Residential District.

== History ==
Located on a hill overlooking the east side of Kimballton, it is among the best-preserved historic Danish churches in Audubon and adjacent Shelby counties. It was deemed significant "for its association with the Grundtvigian synod of the Danish Lutheran Church following the historic split within the church in 1894 and for its influence upon the growth and development of the Danish community of Kimballton. Furthermore, this property is the best representation of that historic synod in the Kimballton community and the two county area." In the worldwide split of the Danish church, this is the main local church that followed the teachings of Bishop N. F. S. Grundtvig and is the only surviving "Grundtvigian" one.

A Christ-like statue on the altar is a copy of the one in Vor Frue Kirke in Copenhagen, Denmark, sculpted by the Danish sculptor Bertel Thorvaldsen.

The church was designed and built by two craftsmen from West Denmark, Wisconsin, Niels Hansen and Jens Rasmussen, who had built a Grundtvigian church there (which burned in the 1930s, though historic photographs survive). They were brought to Kimballton by the pastor Jens Gregersen, who had come from West Denmark. Hansen drew plans for the church similar to the design of the West Denmark church, and Rasmussen created interior features such as the pulpit, the altar, and the communion railing.

The 1898-built Bethany Danish Evangelical Lutheran Church, a mile or two away from Kimballton, also NRHP-listed, is a church that was on the other side of the split.
