= Audubon County Home Historic District =

Historic district in Iowa, United States

- Audubon County Home; Historic District
- U.S. National Register of Historic Places
- U.S. Historic district
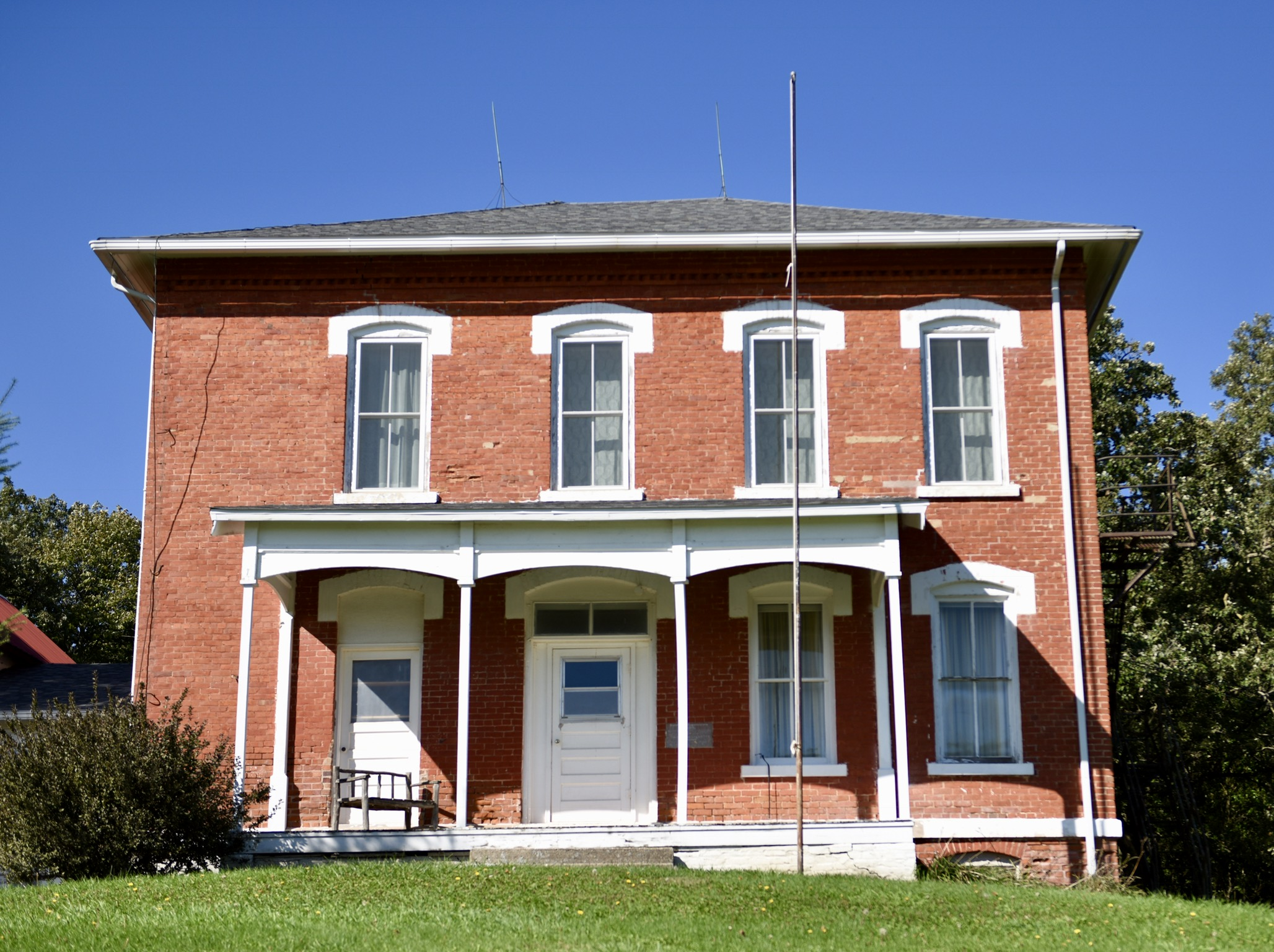

- Location within Iowa Location within the United States
- Location: 1891 215th St.
- Nearest city: Audubon, Iowa
- Coordinates: 41°41′44″N 94°55′21″W
- NRHP reference No.: 15000080
- Added to NRHP: March 17, 2015

The Audubon County Home Historic District, also known as the Nathaniel Hamlin Park & Museum, is a nationally recognized historic district located south of Audubon, Iowa, United States. During their journey to the West, Mormons camped here in the 1840s. The place became known as Blue Grass Grove because of a legend that they spilled bluegrass seed from their wagons. The Meskwaki tribe used the area as a summer campground for hunting parties until 1886. The county purchased the property in 1890, and built the Renaissance Revival style home as a care facility. The facility stood empty for several years when it was designated as a preservation project to observe the United States Bicentennial. The park is named after Nathaniel Hamlin, one of the first settlers in Audubon County. It was listed on the National Register of Historic Places in 2015.
