= Virginia Snedeker =

American artist

Virginia Snedeker Taylor
- Self-portrait (1933)
- Born: Virginia Snedecker; November 25, 1909 1909-11-25; Brooklyn, New York
- Died: 2000 (aged 90–91)
- Known for: muralist, illustrator
- Movement: American Scene

Virginia Snedeker Taylor (1909–2000) was an American painter. She is known for her New Deal era mural in the Audubon, Iowa Post Office as well as her illustrations for The New Yorker magazine.

== Biography ==
Taylor née Snedecker was born on November 25, 1909, in Brooklyn, New York. She studied at the National Academy of Design and the Art Students League of New York where she was taught by Kenneth Hayes Miller. She was a member of the American Scene movement, also known as Regionalism. Snedecker exhibited her work in New York, but earned a living as an illustrator for The New Yorker magazine, creating covers and spot illustrations. Snedecker produced drawings for the magazine from the 1930s through the 1950s. Snedecker was a member of the National Association of Women Artists.

In 1942 Snedecker painted the mural Audubon's Trip down the Ohio and Mississippi–1820 for the Audubon, Iowa Post Office. The mural was funded by the Treasury Section of Fine Arts (TSFA).

Also in 1942 she married fellow artist William Lindsay Taylor (1906-1968) with whom she had two children. Snedecker stopped painting after the birth of her children, and American Scene painting had fallen out of favor following World War II with the advent of Modern Art. She died in 2000.

In 2006 Snedecker was the subject of a retrospective at the Morven Museum & Garden in Princeton, New Jersey. In 2008 the exhibition traveled to the Morris Museum in Morristown, New Jersey. In 2009 Snedecker was included in the retrospective exhibition A Parallel Presence: National Association of Women Artists, 1889-2009 at the UBS Art Gallery.
