= Bennedsen, Boldt, and Hansen Building =

- U.S. National Register of Historic Places
- U.S. Historic district – Contributing property
- Location within Iowa Location within the United States
- Location: Main St. Kimballton, Iowa
- Coordinates: 41°37′42″N 95°04′21″W
- Area: less than one acre
- Built: 1913
- Part of: Kimballton Commercial District (ID95001016)
- MPS: Ethnic Historic Settlement of Shelby and Audubon Counties MPS
- NRHP reference No.: 91001460
- Added to NRHP: October 3, 1991

The Bennedsen, Boldt, and Hansen Building, also known as the General Store Museum, is a historic building in Kimballton, Iowa, United States. Its significance is derived from its association with Danish immigrant craftsmen utilizing local produced materials by other Danish immigrants. The single-story brick structure was the work of Niels Bennedsen (brick mason), Hans P. Boldt (carpenter), and Hans P. Hansen (carpenter). Each owned a one-third interest in the property. Although all three were involved in the construction trade it is only known that Bennedsen worked on the building. It is possible that Hansen did the carpentry work and Boldt, who also owned the local lumber yard, supplied the lumber and woodwork.

The three continued to own the building until 1945 when Bennedsen acquired the ownership for himself before he subsequently sold it. The building had two storefronts with a shared entrance. The north storefront was occupied by J.E. Twenstrup's barbershop and bathhouse from 1913 to 1947. The south storefront was occupied by Walter Madsen's tailor shop. Other business located here over the years have included a feed store, temporary post office, grocery store, and laundromat. It has housed a local history museum since 1984. The building was listed on the National Register of Historic Places in 1991. Four years later it was included as a contributing property in the Kimballton Commercial District.
