= Exira–Elk Horn–Kimballton Community School District =

Public school district in Elk Horn, Iowa, United States

Coordinates: 41.590661°N 95.057347°W

Location
- Elk Horn, Iowa Audubon, Shelby, Cass and Guthrie counties United States
- Coordinates: 41.590661, -95.057347

District information
- Type: Local school district
- Grades: K–12
- Established: 2014
- Superintendent: Trevor Miller
- Schools: 2
- Budget: $7,304,000 (2020-21)
- NCES District ID: 1911250

Students and staff
- Students: 394 (2022-23)
- Teachers: 36.37 FTE
- Staff: 40.69 FTE
- Student–teacher ratio: 10.83
- Athletic conference: Rolling Valley Conference
- District mascot: Spartans
- Colors: Maroon and Black

Other information
- Website: www.exira-ehk.k12.ia.us

The Exira–Elk Horn–Kimballton (Exira–EHK) Community School District is a rural public school district headquartered in Elk Horn, Iowa. It consists of two buildings, one in Elk Horn and one in Exira.

The district is mostly within Audubon and Shelby counties, and it has smaller sections in Cass and Guthrie counties. It serves Elk Horn, Exira, Kimballton, and Brayton.

== History ==
It was formed as a merger of the Elk Horn–Kimballton Community School District and the Exira Community School District. The Exira school district had operated at a deficit in several of the years preceding the merger. The consolidation was effective July 1, 2014. 628 people voted in favor and 82 voted against. It was anticipated that 450 students total would attend the already-consolidated schools; the districts had been in a grade-sharing arrangement in which students from one district attended school in another district.

== Schools ==
PreK-5th grade are in Exira 6th-12th are in Elk Horn

- Exira–Elk Horn–Kimballton Elementary
- Exira–Elk Horn–Kimballton High School

== Exira–Elk Horn–Kimballton High School ==
=== Athletics ===
The Spartans compete in the Rolling Valley Conference in the following sports:

- Baseball
- Basketball (boys and girls)
- Cross country (boys and girls)
- Football
- Softball
- Track and field (boys and girls)
- Volleyball

== See also ==
- List of school districts in Iowa
- List of high schools in Iowa
