= Bethany Danish Evangelical Lutheran Church =

- U.S. National Register of Historic Places
- Location within Iowa Location within the United States
- Nearest city: Kimballton, Iowa
- Coordinates: 41°39′8″N 95°3′11″W
- Area: less than one acre
- Built: 1898
- Built by: Hjuler, Nis P.
- MPS: Ethnic Historic Settlement of Shelby and Audubon Counties MPS
- NRHP reference No.: 91001457
- Added to NRHP: October 3, 1991

Bethany Danish Evangelical Lutheran Church is a historic church in Kimballton, in Audubon County, Iowa. It was built in 1898 and was added to the National Register in 1991.

It is a T-shaped one-story gable-front frame building with a central entry tower, similar to other Danish churches in Audubon County and adjacent Shelby County. It faces to the west, and has an ell on the north which was built in 1906 to serve as a schoolhouse.

It was deemed significant in part for its association with the history of the Danish Lutheran Church, which split in 1894, in the two county area. It was built, at least partly, by skilled Danish carpenter/cabinet-maker, Nis P. Hjuler, and reflects Danish decorative arts.

== See also ==
- Immanuel Danish Evangelical Lutheran Church, also in Kimballton, also NRHP-listed
