= Iowa Highway 44 =

State highway in Iowa, United States

Iowa Highway 44
- Iowa 44 highlighted in red

Route information
- Maintained by Iowa DOT
- Length: 104.524 mi (168.215 km)
- Existed: January 1, 1969–present
- Tourist routes: Western Skies Scenic Byway

Major junctions
- West end: US 30 near Logan
- US 59 at Harlan; US 71 at Hamlin; Iowa 25 at Guthrie Center; Iowa 4 at Panora; US 169 near Dallas Center
- East end: Iowa 141 at Grimes

Location
- Country: United States
- State: Iowa
- Counties: Harrison; Shelby; Audubon; Guthrie; Dallas; Polk

Highway system
- Iowa Primary Highway System; Interstate; US; State; Secondary; Scenic
← Iowa 39	→ Iowa 48

Iowa Highway 44 (Iowa 44) is an east–west highway in the central and west-central portions of the state. It runs parallel to Interstate 80, which runs 10 miles (16 km) to the south for most of Iowa 44's route. Iowa 44 begins at its junction with U.S. Highway 30 four miles (6 km) northeast of Logan. It ends at an interchange with the Iowa Highway 141 freeway at Grimes. Iowa 44 was created in 1969 when Iowa Highway 64 was shortened to its current route in eastern Iowa. Most of the route is a part of the Western Skies Scenic Byway.

== Route description ==
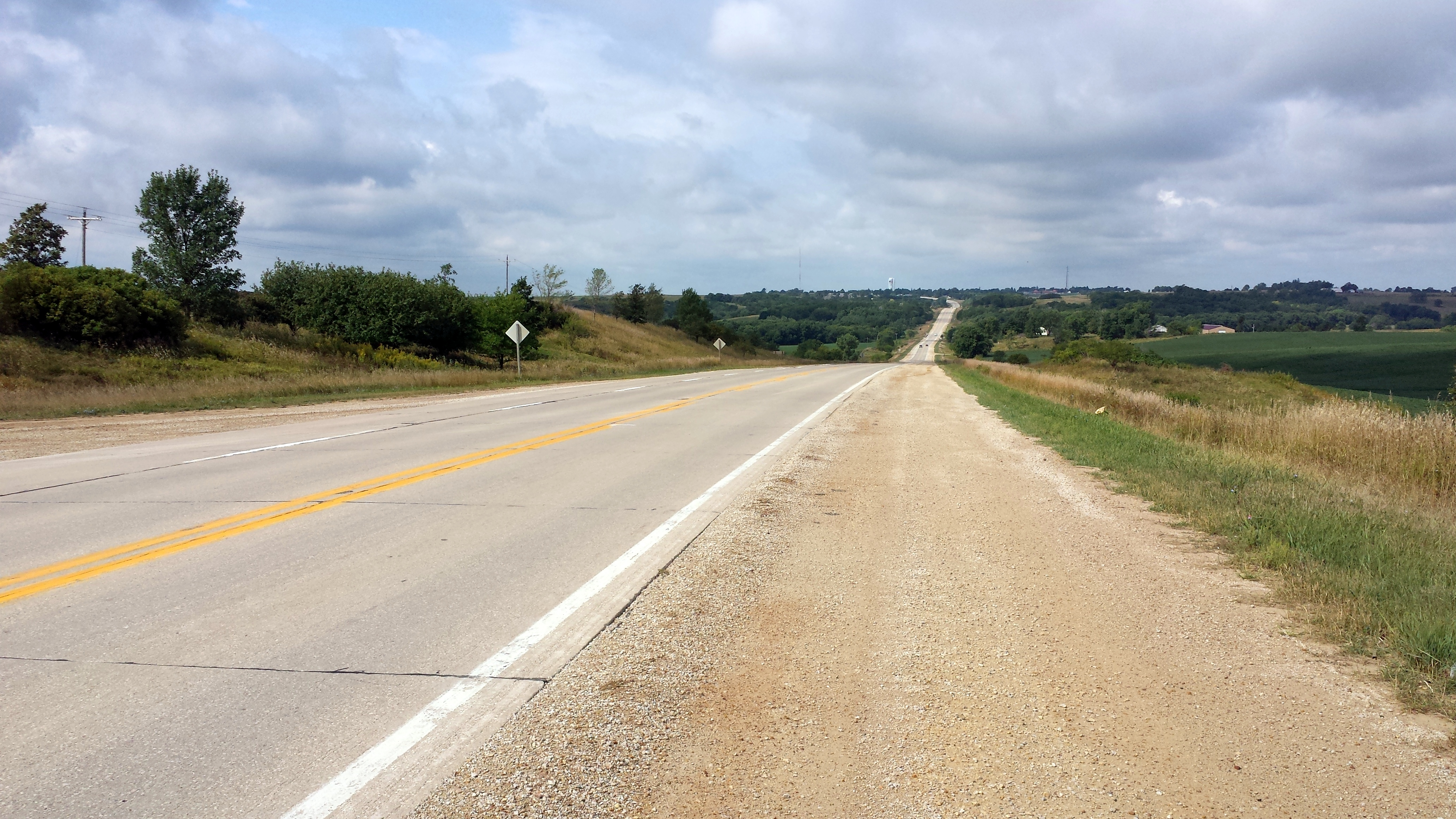
Iowa 44 east of Guthrie Center

Iowa Highway 44 begins between Logan and Woodbine on U.S. Highway 30. It goes east to Portsmouth, where it intersects Iowa Highway 191, then continues east to Harlan, where it intersects U.S. Highway 59. It continues east from Harlan and intersects Iowa Highway 173 at Kimballton and U.S. Highway 71 at Hamlin. It then continues to Guthrie Center, where it intersects Iowa Highway 25 and Panora, where it intersects Iowa Highway 4. It then intersects U.S. Highway 169 three miles (5 km) before entering Dallas Center and ends at a freeway interchange with Iowa Highway 141 in Grimes in the Des Moines metropolitan area.

== History ==
Iowa 44 was created on January 1, 1969, when the Iowa State Highway Commission reorganized the state's primary highway system. Iowa 44 was one of 26 state highways to receive a new route number. Prior to 1969, what is now Iowa 44 was part of two highways, Iowa 64 and Iowa 39. Since its designation, the route has undergone few changes.

The westernmost 74 miles (119 km) of Iowa 44 are part of the state's Western Skies Scenic Byway.

== Major intersections ==
County	Location	mi	km	Destinations	Notes
Harrison	Jefferson Township	0.000	0.000	US 30 – Logan, Woodbine	
Shelby	Portsmouth	11.547	18.583	Iowa 191 (Railway Street) – Panama, Persia	
Shelby	Harlan	20.873	33.592	US 59 – Avoca, Denison	
Audubon	Kimballton	35.337	56.869	Iowa 173 south (Main Street) – Elk Horn	
Audubon	Hamlin	45.225	72.783	US 71 – Audubon, Exira	
Guthrie	Guthrie Center	66.448	106.938	Iowa 25 (5th Street) – Greenfield, Bayard	
Guthrie	Panora	74.023	119.128	Iowa 4 north (NE 3rd Street) – Jefferson	
Dallas	Dallas Center	91.586	147.393	US 169 – Adel, Ogden	
Polk	Grimes	104.524	168.215	Iowa 141 – Urbandale, Perry	
1.000 mi = 1.609 km; 1.000 km = 0.621 mi
