= Exira Community School District =

Former school district in Iowa

Exira Community School District was a school district headquartered in Exira, Iowa. Its schools were Exira Elementary School and Exira Community High School.

In addition to Exira, the district served Brayton.

== History ==
In the late 1950s or early 1960s the Brayton school consolidated into the Exira district.

In a period of several years before its end in 2014, the Exira district operated in a financial deficit. At one point it entered into a grade sharing arrangement with the Elk Horn–Kimballton Community School District, in which students from one district attended school in another district. On July 1, 2014, it consolidated with the Elk Horn–Kimballton district to form the Exira–Elk Horn–Kimballton Community School District. 628 people voted in favor and 82 voted against.
