= Jens T. Larsen House =

Historic house in Iowa, United States

- U.S. National Register of Historic Places
- Location within Iowa Location within the United States
- Location: 103 Main St. Kimballton, Iowa
- Coordinates: 41°37′37″N 95°04′23″W
- Area: Less than one acre
- Built: 1894
- Built by: Anders Jensen
- MPS: Ethnic Historic Settlement of Shelby and Audubon Counties MPS
- NRHP reference No.: 91001451
- Added to NRHP: October 3, 1991

The Jens T. Larsen House is a historic building located in Kimballton, Iowa, United States. Its significance is derived from its association with the Danish immigrant settlement of the community, and the skilled Danish craftsman who lived and worked there. It is believed the house is the work of Anders Jensen, who may have had the assistance of his brother Thorvald. They were natives of Fyn, Denmark who immigrated with the rest of their family to Wisconsin in the 1870s before settling in Audubon County. Built in 1894, the 1½-story frame structure features a T-plan, wall dormers, and a small square tower. The original front porch has subsequently been replaced by an enclosed porch. The house was built for Jens Larsen, also a Danish immigrant. He arrived in 1874 and was engaged in farming. The southern half of Kimballton was his land. This was his retirement home, and he lived here until he died, as did his wife Elena who died in 1928. The house was acquired by their nephew Thomas Christensen, who owned it until 1962. It was listed on the National Register of Historic Places in 1991.
