= Iowa Highway 173 =

State highway in Iowa

Iowa Highway 173
- Iowa 173 highlighted in red

Route information
- Maintained by Iowa DOT
- Length: 14.680 mi (23.625 km)
- Existed: 1930–present
- Tourist routes: Western Skies Scenic Byway

Major junctions
- South end: Iowa 83 northwest of Atlantic
- I-80 northwest of Atlantic
- North end: Iowa 44 in Kimballton

Location
- Country: United States
- State: Iowa
- Counties: Cass; Shelby; Audubon

Highway system
- Iowa Primary Highway System; Interstate; US; State; Secondary; Scenic
← US 169	→ Iowa 175

Iowa Highway 173 (Iowa 173) is a 14-mile-long (23 km) state highway in western Iowa. It begins at Iowa 83 northwest of Atlantic and ends at Iowa 44 in Kimballton. Iowa 173 connects Elk Horn and Kimballton, two small towns with tributes to their residents' Danish heritage. From its intersection with Interstate 80 (I-80) north to Iowa 44, Iowa 173 is designated as part of the Western Skies Scenic Byway. Designated in 1930, the highway was originally a spur route into Elk Horn from Kimballton. The route was lengthened to its current extent in 1980.

== Route description ==
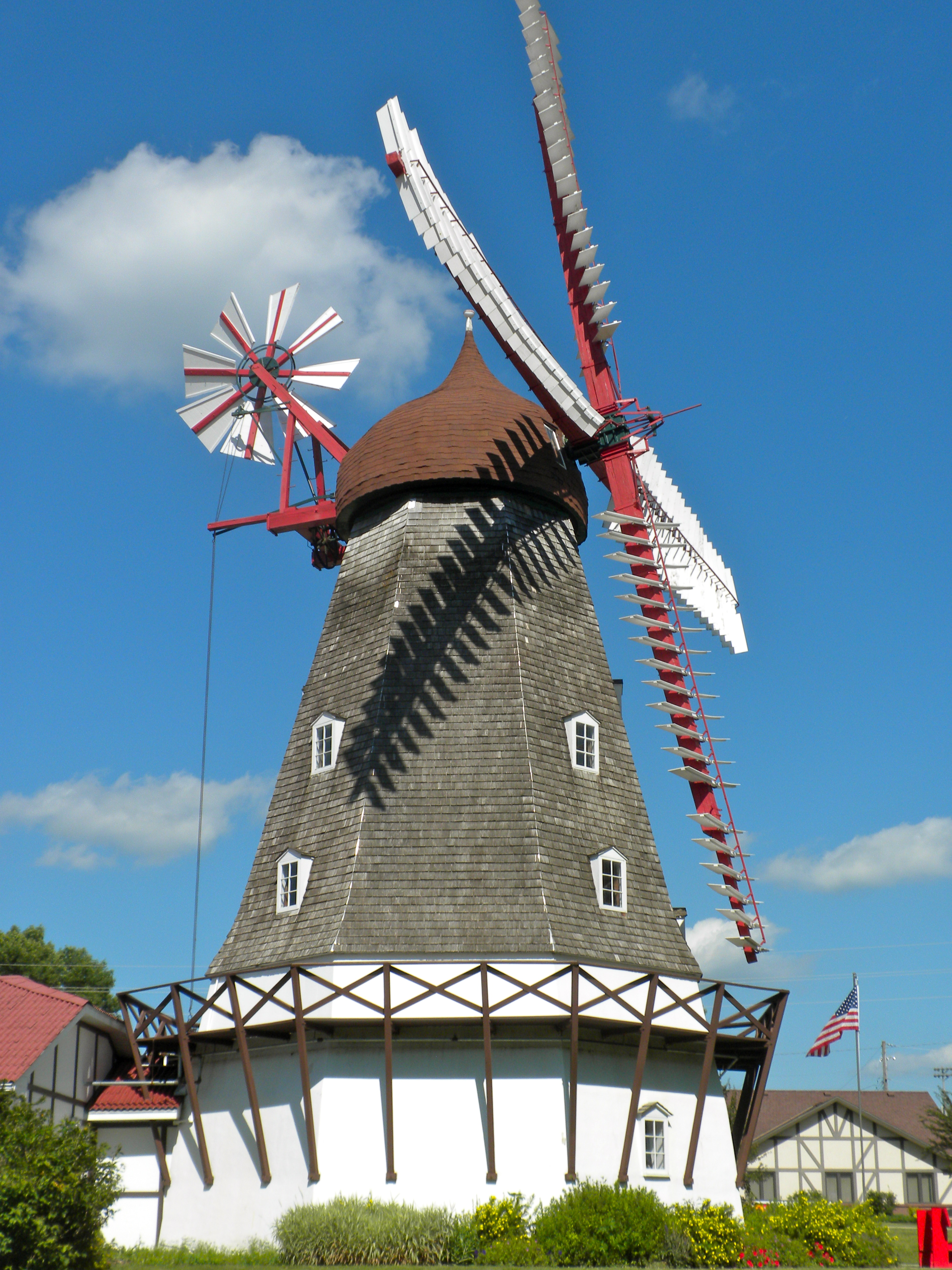
Iowa 173 passes the Danish Windmill in Elk Horn

Iowa 173 begins at an intersection with Iowa 83 three miles (4.8 km) northwest of Atlantic. It heads north through rural Cass County and intersects Interstate 80 (I-80) at a partial cloverleaf interchange. Just north of the Interstate Highway, the route enters Shelby County. Further north, Iowa 173 passes through Elk Horn along Main Street where an authentic Danish windmill greets visitors to the Iowa welcome center.

North of Elk Horn, the highway curves to the west along the Shelby–Audubon county line and then back to the north. It continues north for three miles (4.8 km) until it reaches Kimballton, where it also runs along Main Street. Near its northern end at Iowa 44, Iowa 173 passes a replica of The Little Mermaid, a tribute to the town's Danish heritage. The section of Iowa 173 from I-80 north to Iowa 44 is part of the 140-mile-long (230 km) Western Skies Scenic Byway.

== History ==
Iowa 173 was designated in 1930 along a dirt road as a 3-mile-long (4.8 km) spur route from Iowa 7 near Kimballton south to Elk Horn. The road was graveled in late 1932, and it was paved in 1956. In 1980, Iowa 173 was lengthened significantly to the south. The new 11-mile-long (18 km) section of the route was paved when it was designated. Since its extension, the route has not undergone any changes.

== Major intersections ==
County	Location	mi	km	Destinations	Notes
Cass	Brighton Township	0.000	0.000	Iowa 83 – Atlantic, Marne	Northwest of Atlantic
Cass	Brighton Township	4.944	7.957	I-80 – Council Bluffs, Des Moines	South of Elk Horn
Shelby	No major junctions				
Audubon	Kimballton	14.680	23.625	Iowa 44 – Harlan, Guthrie Center	
1.000 mi = 1.609 km; 1.000 km = 0.621 mi
