= Hamlin, Iowa =

- Unincorporated community
- Location within Iowa
- Coordinates: 41°40′01″N 94°54′21″W
- Country: United States
- State: Iowa
- County: Audubon
- Elevation: 1,260 ft (380 m)
- Time zone: UTC-6 (Central (CST))
  - Summer (DST): UTC-5 (CDT)
- ZIP code: 50117
- Area code: 712
- GNIS feature ID: 457221

Hamlin is an unincorporated community in Audubon County, Iowa, United States.

== History ==
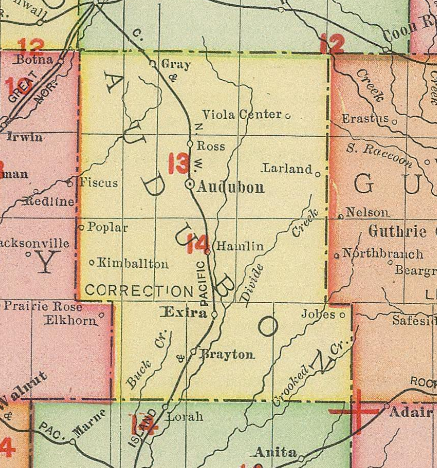
Hamlin appears on the 1903 Rand McNally State of Iowa map.

Hamlin was laid out in 1872. It was named for Nathaniel Hamlin, a pioneer settler.

Hamlin's population was 14 in 1902. The population was 154 in 1940.

== See also ==
- T-Bone Trail
