= Elk Horn–Kimballton Community School District =

Former school district in Iowa

Elk Horn–Kimballton Community School District (EH-K) was a school district headquartered in Elk Horn, Iowa. Its schools were EH-K Elementary School and EH-K High School.

It occupied sections of Audubon and Shelby counties, and it served Elk Horn and Kimballton.

== History ==
It was formed as a merger of the Elk Horn and Kimballton school districts, with 1955 being the opening date. In 1978 an elementary and junior high facility opened. Circa 1998 it had 12 students in preschool and 317 in elementary through high school.

At one point it entered into a grade sharing arrangement, in which students from one district attended school in another district, with the Exira Community School District. It consolidated with the Exira district into the Exira–Elk Horn–Kimballton Community School District on July 1, 2014. 628 people voted in favor and 82 voted against.
