= John D. Bush House =

Historic house in Iowa, United States

- U.S. National Register of Historic Places
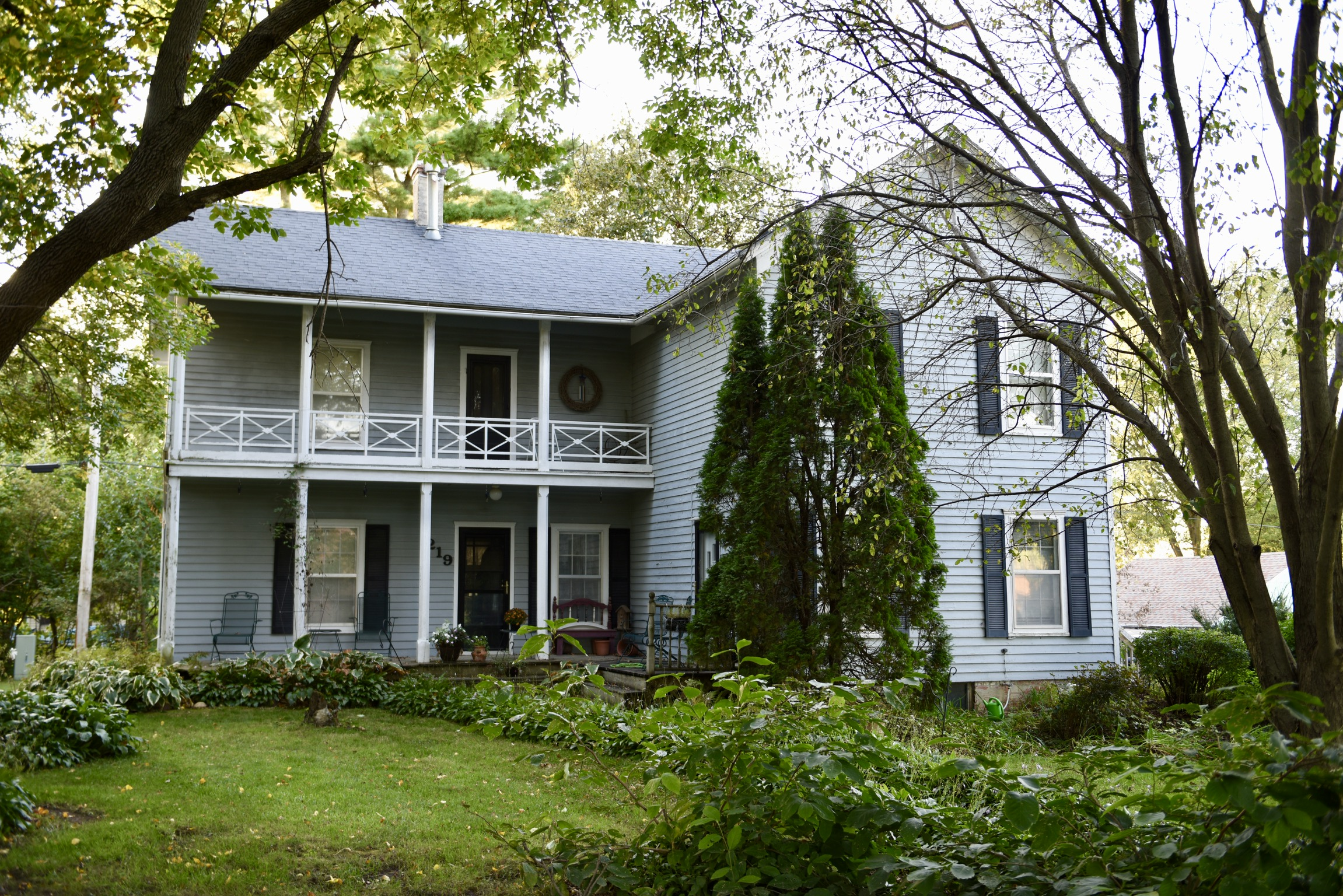

- Location within Iowa Location within the United States
- Location: 219 N. Kilworth; Exira, Iowa
- Coordinates: 41°35′39″N 94°52′32″W
- Area: Less than one acre
- Built: 1873
- Built by: Jens Uriah Hansen
- MPS: Ethnic Historic Settlement of Shelby and Audubon Counties MPS
- NRHP reference No.: 91001461
- Added to NRHP: October 3, 1991

The John D. Bush House is a historic building located in Exira, Iowa, United States. Its significance is derived from its association with the skilled Danish immigrant craftsman Jens Uriah Hansen. He was a native of Lourup, Denmark, and was the first Dane to settle in Audubon County. Hansen was responsible for constructing numerous houses and other buildings in the Exira area. This is the only one with a high degree of structural integrity, and reflects Hansen's carpentry skills. Built in 1873, the two-story frame structure rests on a brick foundation. It features an L-shaped plan, and intersecting gabled roofs. John Bush, for whom the house was built, operated an early general store in town and served as the postmaster. The Bush family retained the property until 1935. It was used as a boarding house for five families in the 1930s. The house was listed on the National Register of Historic Places in 1991.
