= Brayton, Iowa =

- City
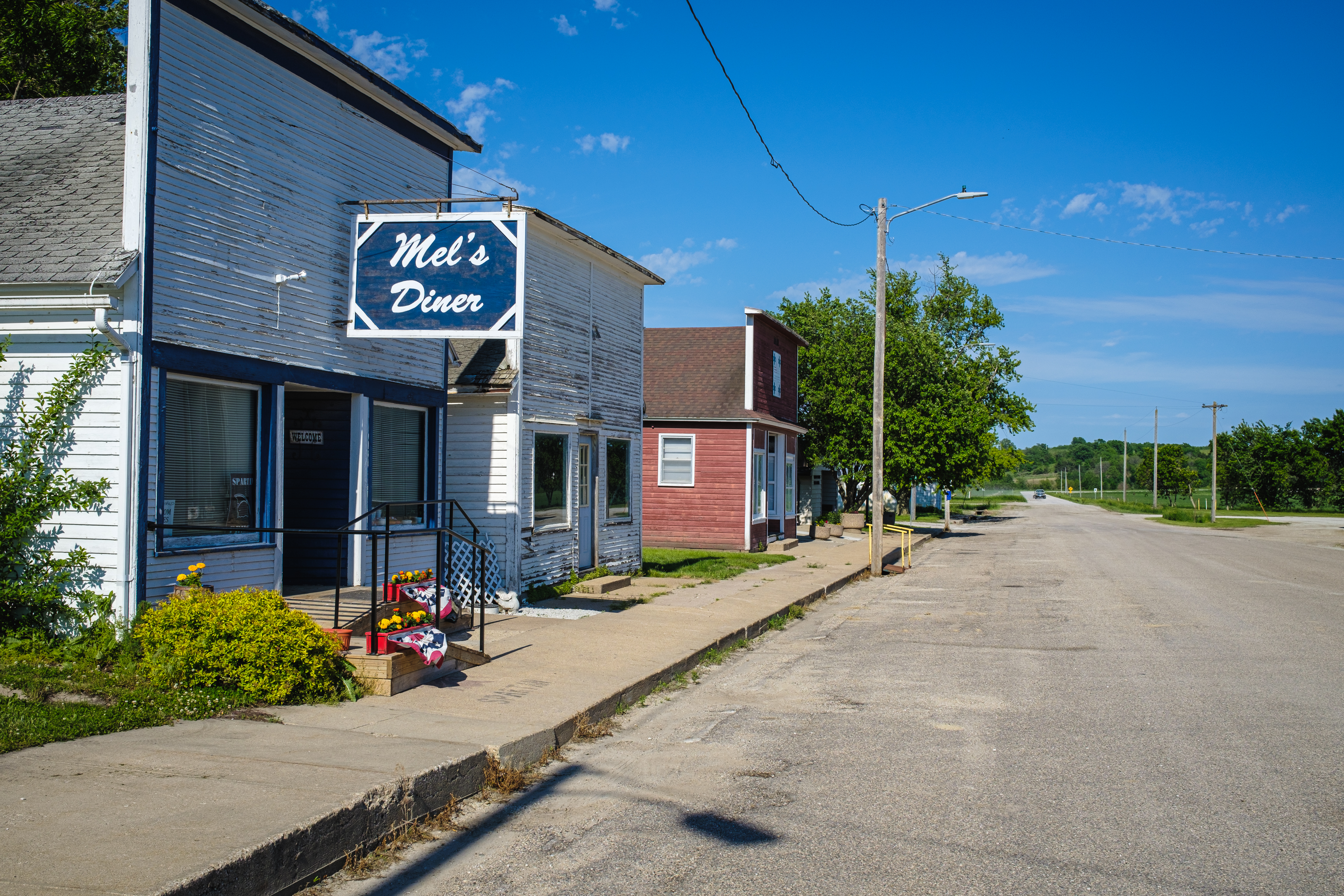
- Looking east on 330th Street

- Location of Brayton, Iowa
- Coordinates: 41°32′41″N 94°55′49″W
- Country: US
- State: Iowa
- County: Audubon

Area
  - Total: 0.44 sq mi (1.13 km^{2})
  - Land: 0.44 sq mi (1.13 km^{2})
  - Water: 0 sq mi (0.00 km^{2})
- Elevation: 1,273 ft (388 m)

Population (2020)
  - Total: 143
  - Density: 329.1/sq mi (127.05/km^{2})
- Time zone: UTC-6 (Central (CST))
  - Summer (DST): UTC-5 (CDT)
- ZIP code: 50042
- Area code: 712
- FIPS code: 19-08200
- GNIS feature ID: 2393403

Brayton is a city in Audubon County, Iowa, United States, along the East Nishnabotna River. The population was 143 at the 2020 census.

== History ==
Brayton was laid out in 1878. Brayton was the name of a railroad employee. The first school was opened in Brayton in 1896.

== Geography ==
According to the United States Census Bureau, the city has a total area of 0.62 square miles (1.61 km^{2}), all of it land.

== Demographics ==
Historical populations
Year	Pop.	±%
1880	38	—
1890	124	+226.3%
1900	141	+13.7%
1910	137	−2.8%
1920	244	+78.1%
1930	236	−3.3%
1940	217	−8.1%
1950	239	+10.1%
1960	225	−5.9%
1970	151	−32.9%
1980	170	+12.6%
1990	148	−12.9%
2000	145	−2.0%
2010	128	−11.7%
2020	143	+11.7%
Source:"U.S. Census website". United States Census Bureau. and Iowa Data Center; Source: U.S. Decennial Census

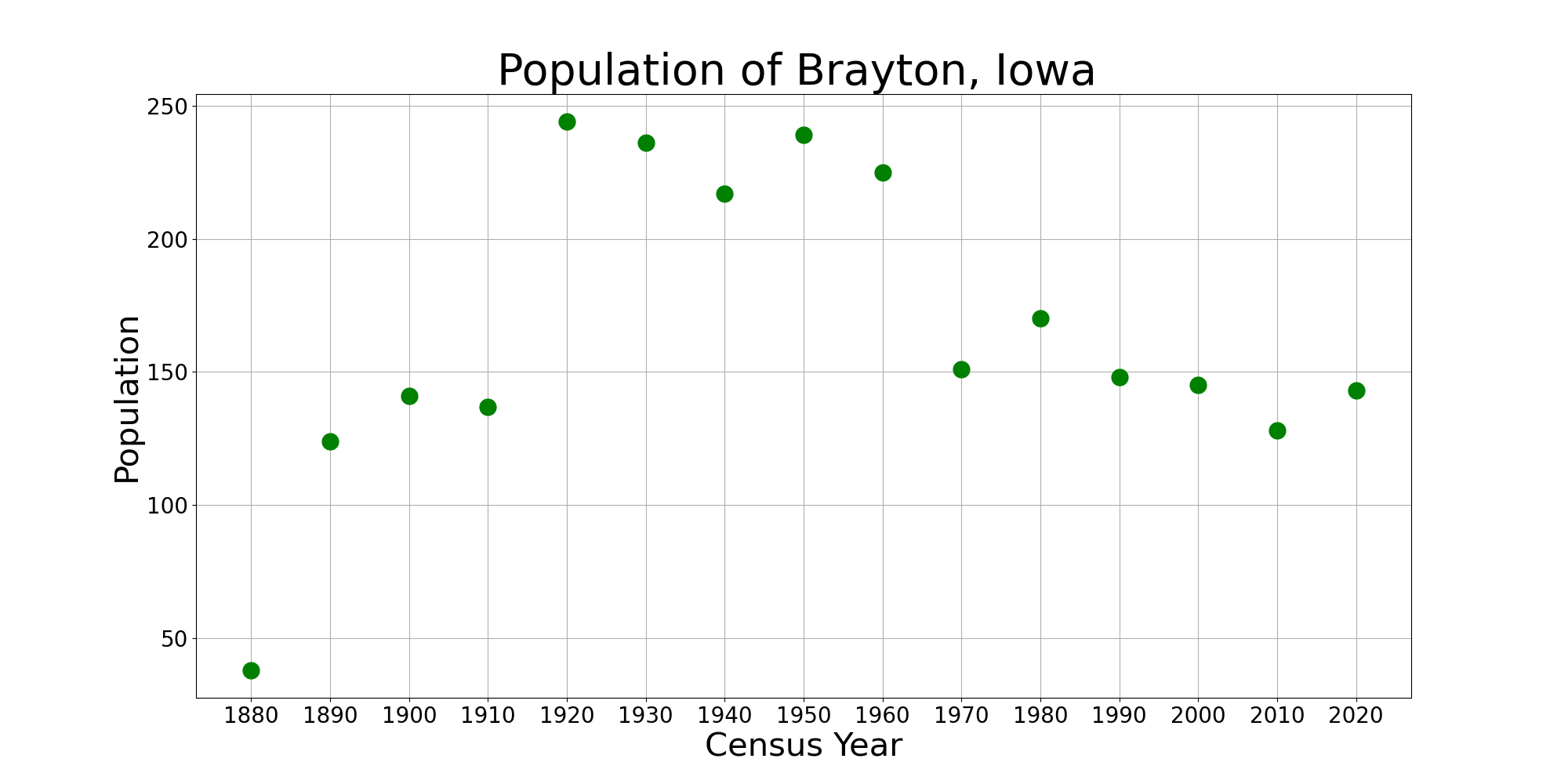
The population of Brayton, Iowa from US census data

=== 2020 census ===
As of the census of 2020, there were 143 people, 60 households, and 39 families residing in the city. The population density was 329.1 inhabitants per square mile (127.1/km^{2}). There were 66 housing units at an average density of 151.9 per square mile (58.6/km^{2}). The racial makeup of the city was 97.9% White, 0.0% Black or African American, 0.0% Native American, 0.0% Asian, 0.0% Pacific Islander, 0.0% from other races and 2.1% from two or more races. Hispanic or Latino persons of any race comprised 0.7% of the population.

Of the 60 households, 40.0% of which had children under the age of 18 living with them, 33.3% were married couples living together, 10.0% were cohabitating couples, 31.7% had a female householder with no spouse or partner present and 25.0% had a male householder with no spouse or partner present. 35.0% of all households were non-families. 31.7% of all households were made up of individuals, 10.0% had someone living alone who was 65 years old or older.

The median age in the city was 36.5 years. 31.5% of the residents were under the age of 20; 2.1% were between the ages of 20 and 24; 28.0% were from 25 and 44; 27.3% were from 45 and 64; and 11.2% were 65 years of age or older. The gender makeup of the city was 50.3% male and 49.7% female.

=== 2010 census ===
As of the census of 2010, there were 128 people, 62 households, and 33 families residing in the city. The population density was 206.5 inhabitants per square mile (79.7/km^{2}). There were 70 housing units at an average density of 112.9 per square mile (43.6/km^{2}). The racial makeup of the city was 98.4% White and 1.6% from two or more races. Hispanic or Latino of any race were 0.8% of the population.

There were 62 households, of which 21.0% had children under the age of 18 living with them, 45.2% were married couples living together, 4.8% had a female householder with no husband present, 3.2% had a male householder with no wife present, and 46.8% were non-families. 40.3% of all households were made up of individuals, and 14.5% had someone living alone who was 65 years of age or older. The average household size was 2.06 and the average family size was 2.79.

The median age in the city was 43 years. 20.3% of residents were under the age of 18; 8.7% were between the ages of 18 and 24; 24.2% were from 25 to 44; 25.9% were from 45 to 64; and 21.1% were 65 years of age or older. The gender makeup of the city was 53.1% male and 46.9% female.

=== 2000 census ===
As of the census of 2000, there were 145 people, 67 households, and 43 families residing in the city. The population density was 235.4 inhabitants per square mile (90.9/km^{2}). There were 73 housing units at an average density of 118.5 per square mile (45.8/km^{2}). The racial makeup of the city was 99.31% White and 0.69% Native American.

There were 67 households, out of which 20.9% had children under the age of 18 living with them, 56.7% were married couples living together, 6.0% had a female householder with no husband present, and 35.8% were non-families. 29.9% of all households were made up of individuals, and 19.4% had someone living alone who was 65 years of age or older. The average household size was 2.16 and the average family size was 2.65.

In the city, the population was spread out, with 19.3% under the age of 18, 8.3% from 18 to 24, 20.7% from 25 to 44, 17.9% from 45 to 64, and 33.8% who were 65 years of age or older. The median age was 46 years. For every 100 females, there were 101.4 males. For every 100 females age 18 and over, there were 95.0 males.

The median income for a household in the city was $25,875, and the median income for a family was $25,625. Males had a median income of $30,833 versus $15,833 for females. The per capita income for the city was $12,166. There were none of the families and 3.9% of the population living below the poverty line, including no under eighteens and 1.8% of those over 64.

== Education ==
It is served by the Exira–Elk Horn–Kimballton Community School District.

Brayton schools consolidated into the Exira Community School District around the late 1950s or early 1960s. On July 1, 2014, the Exira district consolidated with the Elk Horn–Kimballton Community School District to form the Exira–Elk Horn–Kimballton district.

== See also ==
- T-Bone Trail
