= Poplar Rural District =

Historic district in Iowa, United States

- U.S. National Register of Historic Places
- U.S. Historic district
- Location within Iowa Location within the United States
- Location: Roughly the area from Poplar south and west to Wolf Creek
- Nearest city: Jacksonville, Iowa
- Coordinates: 41°40′28″N 95°06′29″W
- Area: 1,244.82 acres (503.76 ha)
- MPS: Ethnic Historic Settlement of Shelby and Audubon Counties MPS
- NRHP reference No.: 91001463
- Added to NRHP: April 9, 1992

The Poplar Rural District is a nationally recognized historic districtwhich contains the small unincorporated community of Poplar which is located to the north of the town Jacksonville, Iowa, United States. It was listed on the National Register of Historic Places in 1992. At the time of its nomination the district consisted of 55 resources, including 29 contributing buildings, one contributing site, five contributing structures, one contributing object, 15 non-contributing buildings, and four non-contributing structures. The 36 contributing resources include three houses, 12 barns, 14 outbuildings, which are all included as buildings. The three corn cribs and the two granaries/corn cribs are the structures. A concrete post fence line is the object, and the landscape of the district is the site. They are all associated with the largest rural settlement of Danish immigrants in the United States. The farmsteads are located on the hilltops or along the hillsides. The latter appear to be somewhat linked to the ethnic heritage of the Danish immigrants who tended to locate their farmsteads on sheltered hillsides. The period of significance starts with the construction of the original Jackson #1 schoolhouse in 1884, and concludes with the construction of the second Jackson #1 schoolhouse in 1923.

== See also ==
Poplar, Iowa
