= Audubon, Iowa =

- City
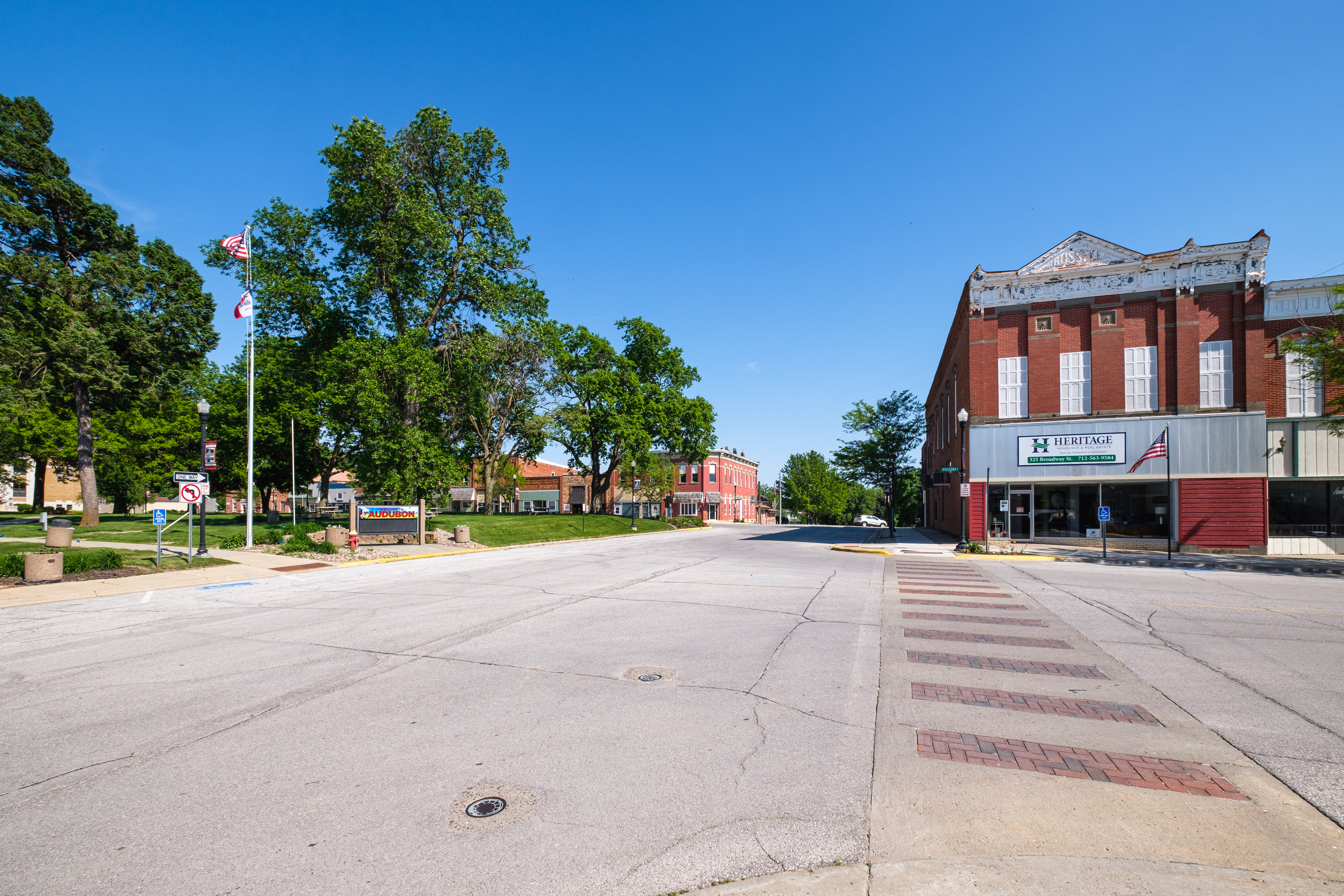
- The town center of Audubon

- Location of Audubon, Iowa
- Coordinates: 41°43′05″N 94°55′42″W
- Country: US
- State: Iowa
- County: Audubon
- Incorporated: December 2, 1880

Area
  - Total: 1.93 sq mi (5.01 km^{2})
  - Land: 1.93 sq mi (5.01 km^{2})
  - Water: 0 sq mi (0.00 km^{2})
- Elevation: 1,322 ft (403 m)

Population (2020)
  - Total: 2,053
  - Density: 1,061.4/sq mi (409.82/km^{2})
- Time zone: UTC-6 (Central (CST))
  - Summer (DST): UTC-5 (CDT)
- ZIP code: 50025
- Area code: 712
- FIPS code: 19-03655
- GNIS feature ID: 2394028
- Website: www.cityofauduboniowa.com

Audubon (Note: /ˈɔːdəbən/; French: [odybɔ̃]) is a city and the county seat in Audubon County, Iowa, United States. The population was 2,053 in the 2020 census, a decline from 2,382 in the 2000 census.

== History ==
The city is named for John James Audubon, an ornithologist, artist, and painter.

Audubon was laid out by the Chicago, Rock Island and Pacific Railroad, on September 23, 1878. An auction sale of town lots was held on October 15, 1878, with a total sales of $6,190. The railroad was completed on December 6, 1878, and by December 16, 1878, over fifty houses, a bank, five general stores, one jewelry store, two hotels, one restaurant, three meat markets, three blacksmith shops, one harness shop, one livery stable, two coal yards, two lumber yards, one elevator, three grain dealers, and a school house were built. With the four months of rapid growth in Audubon there was already talk of moving the county seat from Exira which was 13 miles away. In 1879 the railroad built what was to become the county courthouse and leased it to the county for five years free of cost, in case the county seat was moved to Audubon. In the 1879 general election the vote approved the moving of the county seat to Audubon.

Although the railroad was responsible for starting the town, Ethelbert J. Freeman was the driving force behind the growth of Audubon. Having lived in Exira, Freeman was the agent for the sale of the railroad lands and the town lots and was one of the first people to live in Audubon. Already active in county politics, he became the first mayor of Audubon and was prominent in the incorporation of the town in 1880. Freeman was half owner of the Citizens Bank, chief of the fire department, and became the manager of the waterworks built in 1882 and later manager of the electric light plant when it was built in 1891.

The first postmaster was Arthur L. Sanborn, appointed February 15, 1879. The town post office contains a mural, Audubon's Trip Down the Ohio and Mississippi – 1820, painted in 1942 by Virginia Snedeker. Federally commissioned murals were produced from 1934 to 1943 in the United States through the Section of Painting and Sculpture, later called the Section of Fine Arts, of the Treasury Department. Robert Hunter was the first school teacher from 1878 to 1879. The school keep growing in size and enrollment and by the fall of 1887 the school had eight school rooms, a teaching staff of 10, and 416 pupils enrolled. Audubon was a well-established city by 1900, and growth slowed after that. In 1915 the city was recorded to have a public library, 9 lawyers, 10 medical professionals, 3 veterinarians, 7 clergymen, 4 bankers and many other businesses.

Audubon was a RAGBRAI overnight stop in 1986 and 2006.

== Geography ==
According to the United States Census Bureau, the city has a total area of 1.88 square miles (4.87 km^{2}), all of it land.

=== Climate ===
According to the Köppen Climate Classification system, Audubon has a hot-summer humid continental climate, abbreviated "Dfa" on climate maps.

Climate data for Audubon, Iowa, 1991–2020 normals, extremes 1893–present
Month	Jan	Feb	Mar	Apr	May	Jun	Jul	Aug	Sep	Oct	Nov	Dec	Year
Record high °F (°C)	67 (19)	73 (23)	90 (32)	93 (34)	104 (40)	105 (41)	113 (45)	110 (43)	101 (38)	93 (34)	78 (26)	69 (21)	113 (45)
Mean maximum °F (°C)	50.5 (10.3)	55.9 (13.3)	71.9 (22.2)	82.2 (27.9)	88.1 (31.2)	90.9 (32.7)	91.7 (33.2)	91.0 (32.8)	88.6 (31.4)	83.1 (28.4)	67.8 (19.9)	54.8 (12.7)	94.0 (34.4)
Mean daily maximum °F (°C)	28.0 (−2.2)	32.6 (0.3)	46.3 (7.9)	59.7 (15.4)	70.2 (21.2)	79.6 (26.4)	82.6 (28.1)	80.7 (27.1)	74.7 (23.7)	62.0 (16.7)	46.3 (7.9)	33.0 (0.6)	58.0 (14.4)
Daily mean °F (°C)	18.4 (−7.6)	22.7 (−5.2)	35.3 (1.8)	47.4 (8.6)	58.9 (14.9)	68.9 (20.5)	72.1 (22.3)	69.8 (21.0)	62.3 (16.8)	49.5 (9.7)	35.5 (1.9)	23.7 (−4.6)	47.0 (8.3)
Mean daily minimum °F (°C)	8.8 (−12.9)	12.7 (−10.7)	24.4 (−4.2)	35.1 (1.7)	47.6 (8.7)	58.1 (14.5)	61.6 (16.4)	59.0 (15.0)	49.8 (9.9)	37.1 (2.8)	24.8 (−4.0)	14.4 (−9.8)	36.1 (2.3)
Mean minimum °F (°C)	−13.1 (−25.1)	−9.1 (−22.8)	4.0 (−15.6)	19.5 (−6.9)	32.0 (0.0)	44.0 (6.7)	49.9 (9.9)	48.0 (8.9)	33.2 (0.7)	20.1 (−6.6)	6.8 (−14.0)	−6.3 (−21.3)	−16.7 (−27.1)
Record low °F (°C)	−34 (−37)	−35 (−37)	−23 (−31)	4 (−16)	20 (−7)	35 (2)	40 (4)	35 (2)	22 (−6)	0 (−18)	−14 (−26)	−29 (−34)	−35 (−37)
Average precipitation inches (mm)	0.88 (22)	1.14 (29)	1.68 (43)	3.65 (93)	5.18 (132)	5.11 (130)	3.82 (97)	4.51 (115)	3.52 (89)	2.83 (72)	1.53 (39)	1.18 (30)	35.03 (891)
Average snowfall inches (cm)	4.8 (12)	4.7 (12)	3.1 (7.9)	1.3 (3.3)	0.0 (0.0)	0.0 (0.0)	0.0 (0.0)	0.0 (0.0)	trace	0.4 (1.0)	2.2 (5.6)	7.3 (19)	23.8 (60.8)
Average precipitation days (≥ 0.01 in)	5.2	5.2	6.7	10.0	12.1	10.2	9.2	8.8	7.6	7.5	5.2	5.5	93.2
Average snowy days (≥ 0.1 in)	2.7	2.0	1.4	0.6	0.0	0.0	0.0	0.0	0.0	0.3	1.3	3.5	11.8
Source 1: NOAA (snow/snow days 1981–2010)
Source 2: National Weather Service

== Demographics ==
Historical population
Census	Pop.	Note	%±
1880	792		—
1890	1,310		65.4%
1900	1,866		42.4%
1910	1,923		3.1%
1920	2,108		9.6%
1930	2,255		7.0%
1940	2,409		6.8%
1950	2,808		16.6%
1960	2,928		4.3%
1970	2,907		−0.7%
1980	2,841		−2.3%
1990	2,524		−11.2%
2000	2,382		−5.6%
2010	2,176		−8.6%
2020	2,053		−5.7%
U.S. Decennial Census

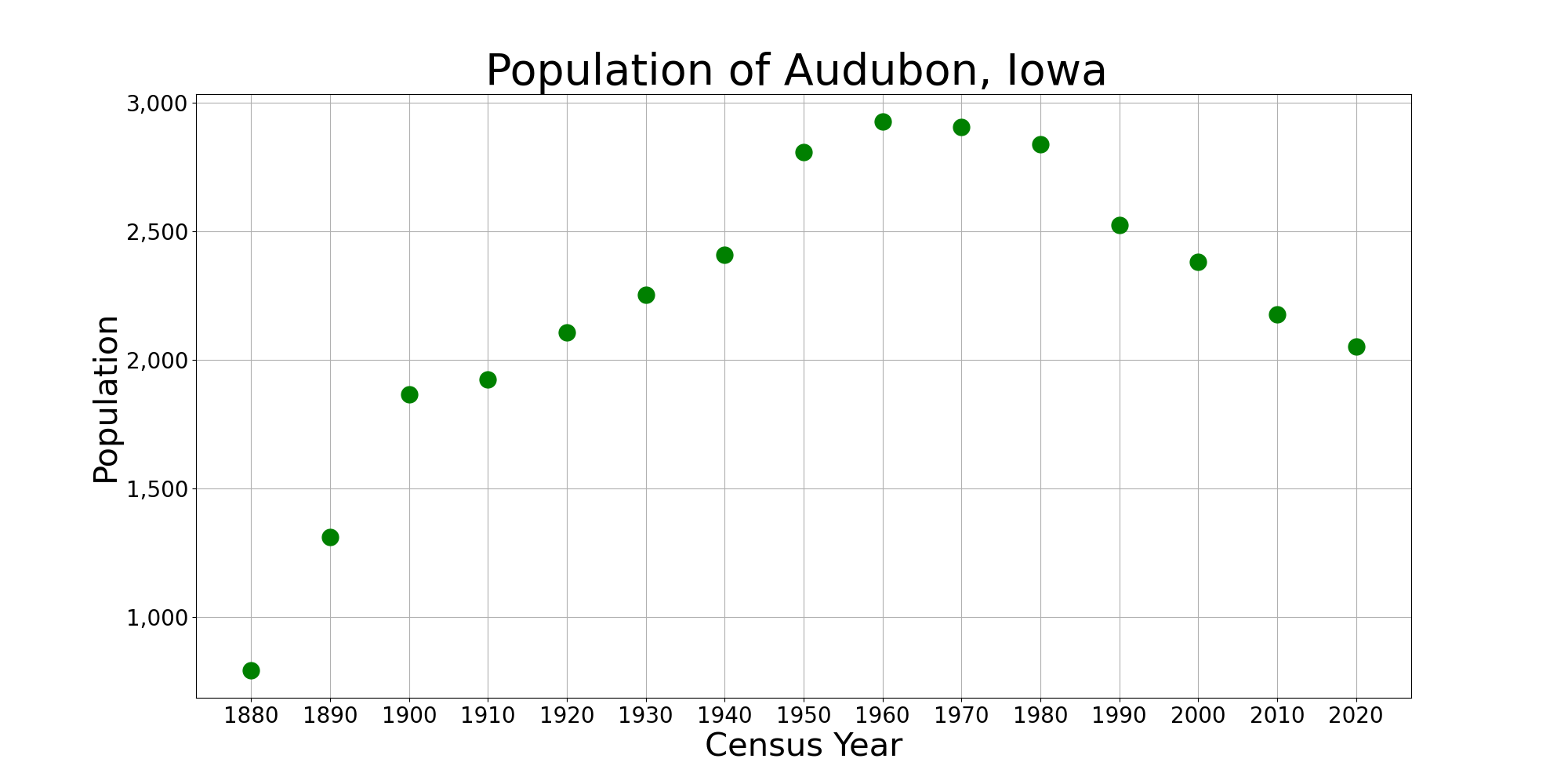
The population of Audubon, Iowa from US census data

=== 2020 census ===
As of the 2020 census, Audubon had a population of 2,053, with 930 households and 527 families residing in the city. The median age was 44.7 years. 22.5% of residents were under the age of 18 and 26.1% were 65 years of age or older.

The population density was 1,061.4 inhabitants per square mile (409.8/km^{2}). There were 1,047 housing units at an average density of 541.3 per square mile (209.0/km^{2}). Of the households, 21.7% had children under the age of 18 living with them, 43.9% were married-couple households, 6.2% were cohabiting-couple households, 29.8% had a female householder with no spouse or partner present, and 20.1% had a male householder with no spouse or partner present. About 43.3% of households were non-families, 38.3% were made up of individuals, and 21.0% had someone living alone who was 65 years of age or older.

There were 1,047 housing units, of which 11.2% were vacant. The homeowner vacancy rate was 2.3% and the rental vacancy rate was 17.6%. 0.0% of residents lived in urban areas, while 100.0% lived in rural areas.

The age distribution was 23.8% under the age of 20, 4.5% from 20 to 24, 22.0% from 25 to 44, 23.6% from 45 to 64, and 26.1% age 65 or older. The gender makeup of the city was 47.8% male and 52.2% female.

Racial composition as of the 2020 census
Race	Number	Percent
White	1,941	94.5%
Black or African American	8	0.4%
American Indian and Alaska Native	1	0.0%
Asian	1	0.0%
Native Hawaiian and Other Pacific Islander	0	0.0%
Some other race	28	1.4%
Two or more races	74	3.6%
Hispanic or Latino (of any race)	56	2.7%

=== 2010 census ===
At the 2010 census there were 2,176 people, 961 households, and 586 families living in the city. The population density was 1,157.4 inhabitants per square mile (446.9/km^{2}). There were 1,106 housing units at an average density of 588.3 per square mile (227.1/km^{2}). The racial makup of the city was 98.9% White, 0.2% African American, 0.3% Native American, 0.2% Asian, and 0.3% from two or more races. Hispanic or Latino of any race were 0.7%.

Of the 961 households 26.0% had children under the age of 18 living with them, 48.4% were married couples living together, 8.5% had a female householder with no husband present, 4.1% had a male householder with no wife present, and 39.0% were non-families. 36.6% of households were one person and 22% were one person aged 65 or older. The average household size was 2.18 and the average family size was 2.82.

The median age was 47.5 years. 21.9% of residents were under the age of 18; 5.4% were between the ages of 18 and 24; 19.5% were from 25 to 44; 24.6% were from 45 to 64; and 28.5% were 65 or older. The gender makeup of the city was 46.5% male and 53.5% female.

=== 2000 census ===
At the 2000 census there were 2,382 people, 1,035 households, and 646 families living in the city. The population density was 1,354.2 inhabitants per square mile (522.9/km^{2}). There were 1,107 housing units at an average density of 629.4 per square mile (243.0/km^{2}). The racial makup of the city was 99.33% White, 0.25% African American, and 0.42% from two or more races. Hispanic or Latino of any race were 0.34%.

Of the 1,035 households 24.9% had children under the age of 18 living with them, 54.0% were married couples living together, 6.9% had a female householder with no husband present, and 37.5% were non-families. 36.0% of households were one person and 23.1% were one person aged 65 or older. The average household size was 2.18 and the average family size was 2.83.

Age spread: 22.8% under the age of 18, 4.9% from 18 to 24, 20.8% from 25 to 44, 20.2% from 45 to 64, and 31.3% 65 or older. The median age was 46 years. For every 100 females, there were 82.0 males. For every 100 females age 18 and over, there were 76.9 males.

The median household income was $33,068 and the median family income was $40,455. Males had a median income of $31,071 versus $19,183 for females. The per capita income for the city was $20,128. About 5.9% of families and 6.7% of the population were below the poverty line, including 6.9% of those under age 18 and 7.1% of those age 65 or over.

== Arts and culture ==
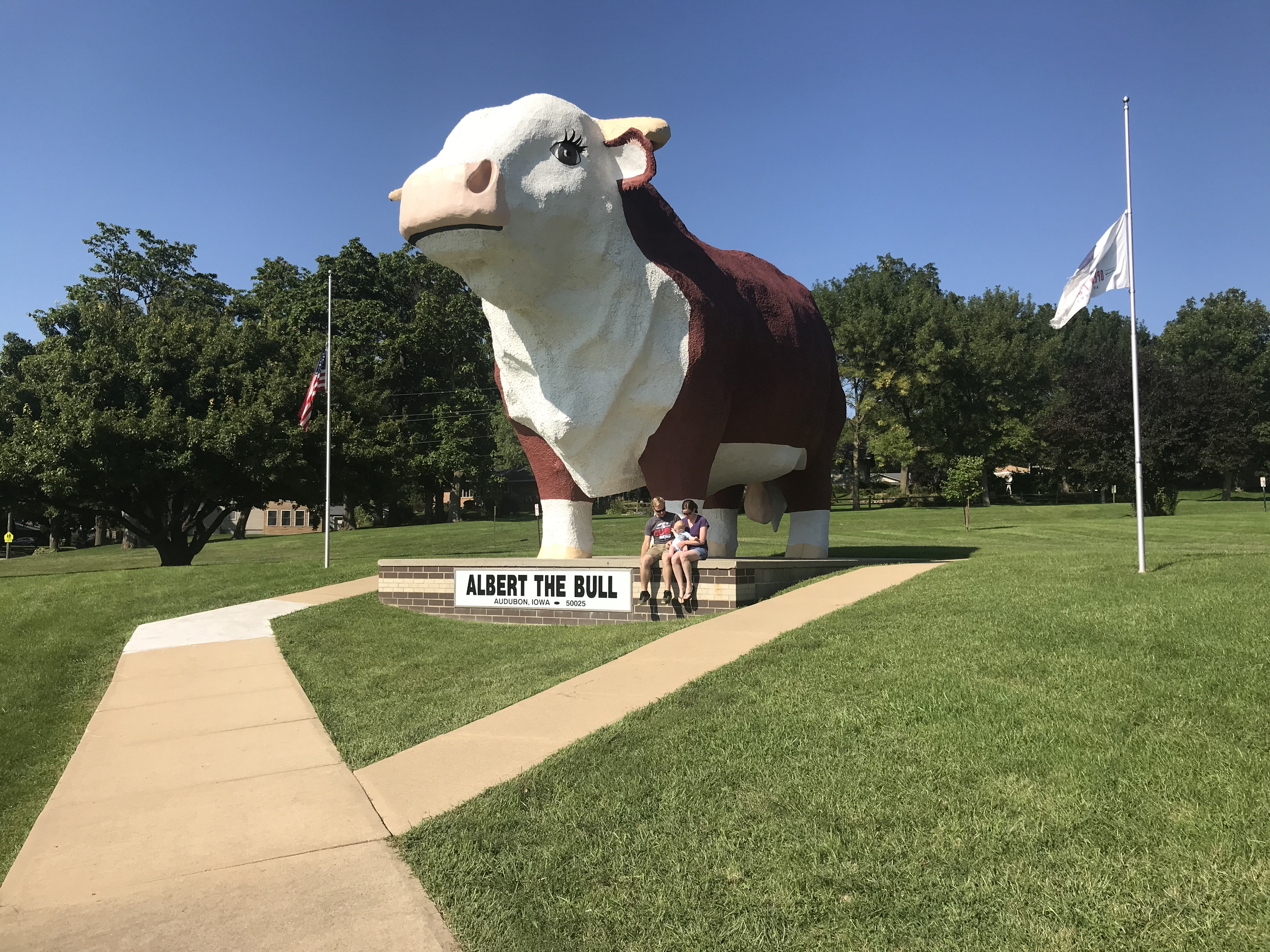
Albert The Bull

=== Annual events ===
- John James Audubon festival in April, in honor of the town's namesake.
- "Operation T-bone", in August, with a variety of events including the T-Bone feeders' auction.

=== Landmarks ===
Albert the Bull, a 30 ft (9.1 m) tall statue, weighing 45 tons.

== Notable people ==
- Elmer Carlson (1909–2005), cornhusking champion and company founder
- Otto Colee (1895–1969), college football player and dental surgeon
- William R. Green (1856–1947) US Representative from Iowa's 9th congressional district for nine terms
- Harold R. Kaufman (1926–2018), award-winning American physicist, professor, and patent holder
- Charles Taylor Manatt (1936–2011), chairman of the Democratic National Committee 1981–85
- C. W. McCall - pseudonym of William Dale Fries Jr. (1928–2022), advertising executive and singer, best known for the song Convoy. McCall recorded a song about his hometown, "Audubon", in 1975.
- Harriet Spanel (1939–2016), Washington state legislator and community volunteer

== See also ==
- T-Bone Trail
