= Exira, Iowa =

- City
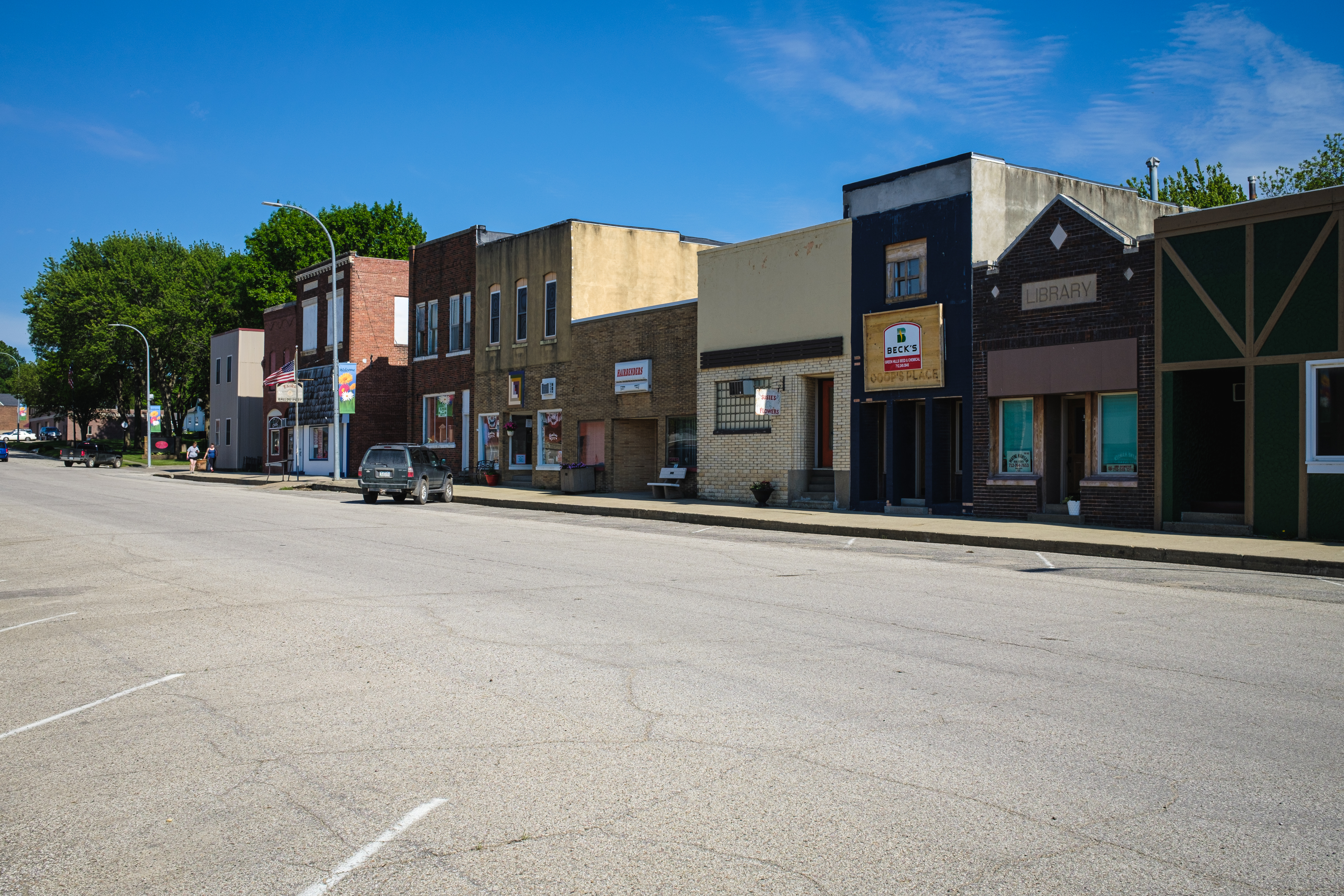
- Downtown Exira on Washington Street

- Location of Exira, Iowa
- Coordinates: 41°35′30″N 94°52′42″W
- Country: US
- State: Iowa
- County: Audubon

Area
  - Total: 1.03 sq mi (2.67 km^{2})
  - Land: 1.03 sq mi (2.67 km^{2})
  - Water: 0 sq mi (0.00 km^{2})
- Elevation: 1,227 ft (374 m)

Population (2020)
  - Total: 787
  - Density: 763.1/sq mi (294.62/km^{2})
- Time zone: UTC-6 (Central (CST))
  - Summer (DST): UTC-5 (CDT)
- ZIP code: 50076
- Area code: 712
- FIPS code: 19-26265
- GNIS feature ID: 2394720
- Website: www.exiraiowa.com

Exira is a city in Audubon County, Iowa, United States, along the East Nishnabotna River and U.S. Route 71. The population was 787 at the time of the 2020 census.

== History ==
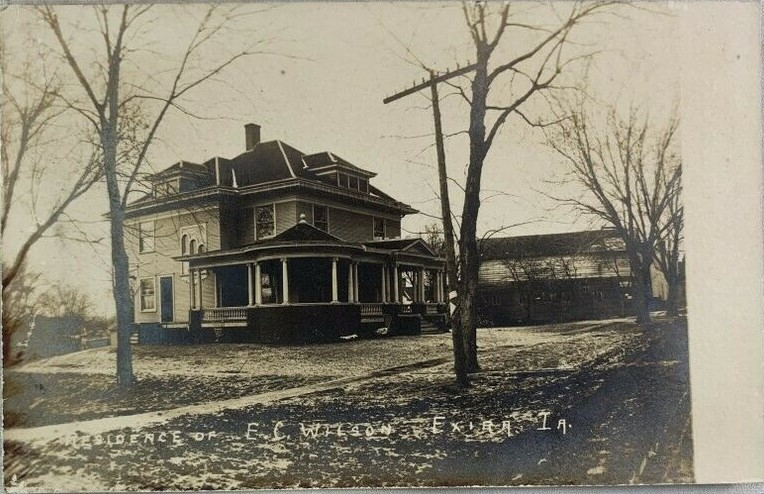
The Eugene C. Wilson House stood at the northwest corner of Main and Carthage Streets in Exira, Iowa

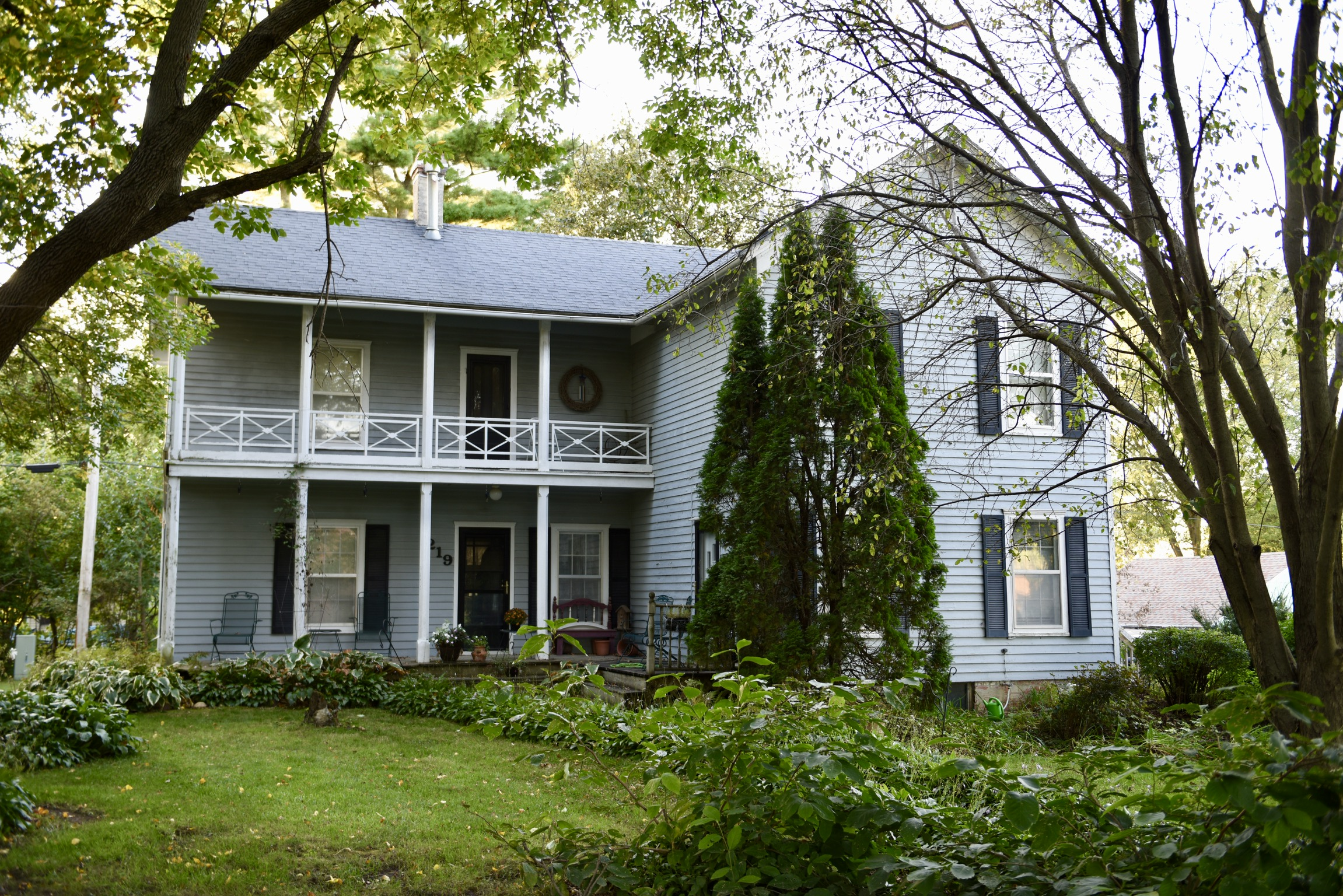
John D. Bush House

The oldest town in Audubon County, Exira was founded in 1857. The town was named for Exira Eckman, daughter of Judge John Eckman from Ohio, who agreed to purchase a lot of property in the town if the town was named for his daughter.

The main industries in and around Exira are agriculture and agribusiness. Exira has a school, completed in 1959. There are four churches in the town.

On July 2, 1958, Exira was ravaged by the flooding of the East Nishnabotna River. Nineteen persons in the area lost their lives, 75 homes were destroyed and almost 20 businesses in the western part of Exira were damaged.

Exira is well known for its Fourth of July celebrations, which have been celebrated since 1861. The morning parade and the evening fireworks draw thousands of visitors to the town. Other attractions in the area include the Plow in the Oak Park, south of Exira on Highway 71, and Littlefield Recreation Area, 6 miles (9.7 km) southeast of Exira, which features a 70-acre (280,000 m^{2}) lake, prairie restoration area and a live bison pair.

== Geography ==
According to the United States Census Bureau, the city has a total area of 1.02 square miles (2.64 km^{2}), all land.

== Demographics ==
Historical populations
Year	Pop.	±%
1860	83	—
1870	161	+94.0%
1880	604	+275.2%
1890	575	−4.8%
1900	851	+48.0%
1910	787	−7.5%
1920	840	+6.7%
1930	937	+11.5%
1940	1,046	+11.6%
1950	1,129	+7.9%
1960	1,111	−1.6%
1970	966	−13.1%
1980	978	+1.2%
1990	955	−2.4%
2000	810	−15.2%
2010	840	+3.7%
2020	787	−6.3%
Source:"U.S. Census website". United States Census Bureau. and Iowa Data Center; Source: U.S. Decennial Census

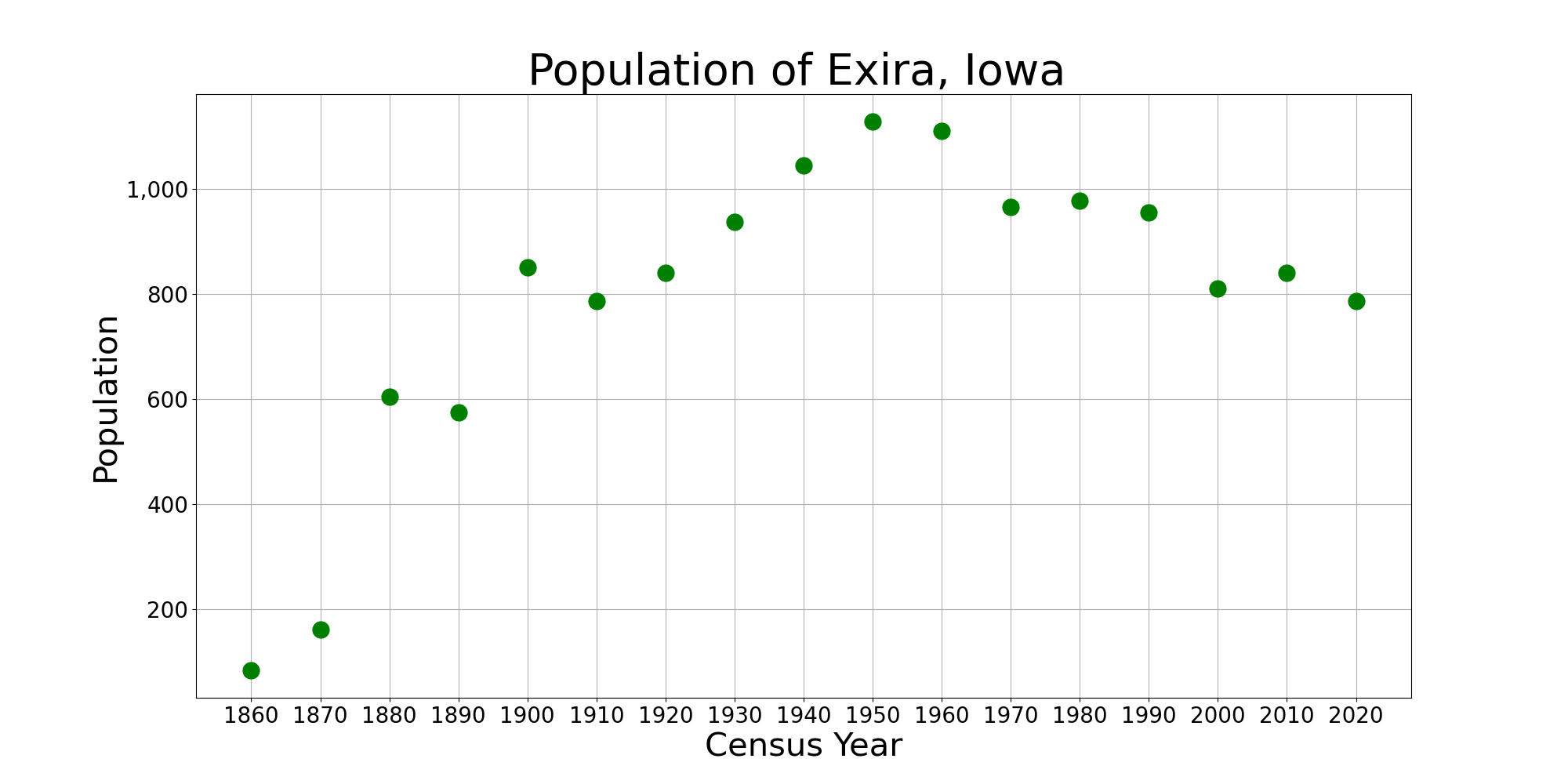
The population of Exira, Iowa from US census data

=== 2020 census ===
As of the census of 2020, there were 787 people, 358 households, and 188 families residing in the city. The population density was 763.1 inhabitants per square mile (294.6/km^{2}). There were 392 housing units at an average density of 380.1 per square mile (146.7/km^{2}). The racial makeup of the city was 96.3% White, 0.1% Black or African American, 0.4% Native American, 0.1% Asian, 0.0% Pacific Islander, 0.0% from other races and 3.0% from two or more races. Hispanic or Latino persons of any race comprised 0.8% of the population.

Of the 358 households, 22.1% of which had children under the age of 18 living with them, 41.9% were married couples living together, 5.6% were cohabitating couples, 32.7% had a female householder with no spouse or partner present and 19.8% had a male householder with no spouse or partner present. 47.5% of all households were non-families. 43.3% of all households were made up of individuals, 24.6% had someone living alone who was 65 years old or older.

The median age in the city was 49.3 years. 20.3% of the residents were under the age of 20; 4.4% were between the ages of 20 and 24; 20.7% were from 25 and 44; 24.0% were from 45 and 64; and 30.5% were 65 years of age or older. The gender makeup of the city was 46.4% male and 53.6% female.

=== 2010 census ===
As of the census of 2010, there were 840 people, 381 households, and 217 families living in the city. The population density was 823.5 inhabitants per square mile (318.0/km^{2}). There were 422 housing units at an average density of 413.7 per square mile (159.7/km^{2}). The racial makeup of the city was 98.6% White, 0.2% African American, 0.1% Native American, 0.4% Asian, and 0.7% from two or more races. Hispanic or Latino of any race were 1.4% of the population.

There were 381 households, of which 21.0% had children under the age of 18 living with them, 42.8% were married couples living together, 10.0% had a female householder with no husband present, 4.2% had a male householder with no wife present, and 43.0% were non-families. 38.1% of all households were made up of individuals, and 20.2% had someone living alone who was 65 years of age or older. The average household size was 2.06 and the average family size was 2.63.

The median age in the city was 49.7 years. 16.4% of residents were under the age of 18; 7.1% were between the ages of 18 and 24; 19.4% were from 25 to 44; 27.8% were from 45 to 64; and 29.3% were 65 years of age or older. The gender makeup of the city was 43.1% male and 56.9% female.

=== 2000 census ===
As of the census of 2000, there were 810 people, 362 households, and 211 families living in the city. The population density was 791.0 inhabitants per square mile (305.4/km^{2}). There were 394 housing units at an average density of 384.7 per square mile (148.5/km^{2}). The racial makeup of the city was 98.64% White, 0.25% African American, 0.12% Native American, 0.49% Asian, and 0.49% from two or more races. Hispanic or Latino of any race were 0.86% of the population.

There were 362 households, out of which 24.3% had children under the age of 18 living with them, 44.2% were married couples living together, 10.2% had a female householder with no husband present, and 41.7% were non-families. 38.1% of all households were made up of individuals, and 27.6% had someone living alone who was 65 years of age or older. The average household size was 2.08 and the average family size was 2.74.

In the city, the population was spread out, with 21.9% under the age of 18, 4.6% from 18 to 24, 19.0% from 25 to 44, 20.9% from 45 to 64, and 33.7% who were 65 years of age or older. The median age was 49 years. For every 100 females, there were 73.1 males. For every 100 females age 18 and over, there were 69.7 males.

The median income for a household in the city was $26,319, and the median income for a family was $32,222. Males had a median income of $25,917 versus $17,656 for females. The per capita income for the city was $15,124. About 9.9% of families and 11.7% of the population were below the poverty line, including 19.0% of those under age 18 and 13.0% of those age 65 or over.

== Education ==
It is served by the Exira–Elk Horn–Kimballton Community School District. It was in the Exira Community School District until it consolidated into Exira-EHK on July 1, 2014.

== Notable people ==
- Ben F. Jensen (1892–1970) U.S. Representative for the former Iowa's 7th congressional district
- Jack Pardee (1936–2013) NFL player and Head Coach

== See also ==
- T-Bone Trail
- John D. Bush House
