= Kimballton, Iowa =

- City
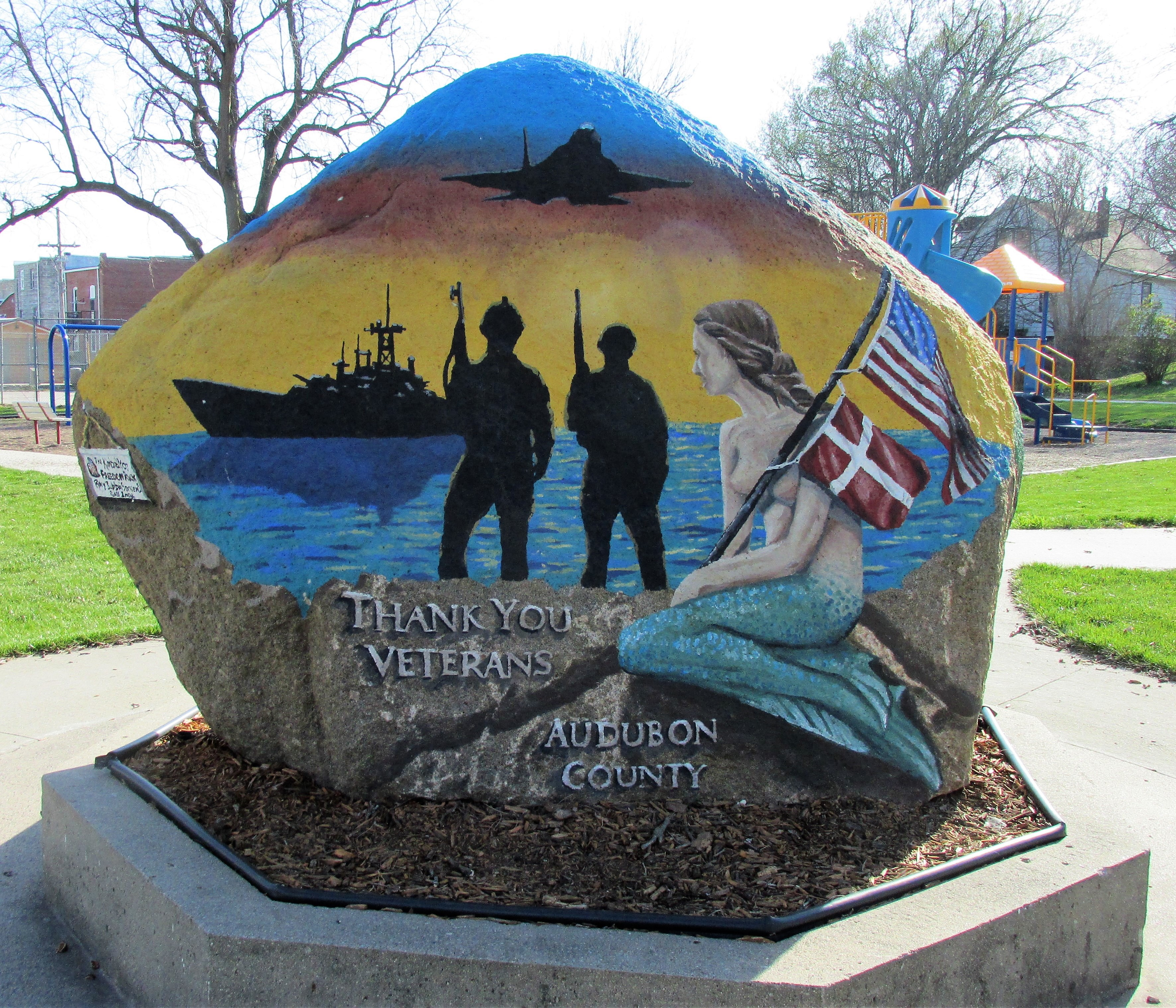
- The Audubon County Freedom Rock located in Kimballton

- Location of Kimballton, Iowa
- Coordinates: 41°37′28″N 95°04′27″W
- Country: US
- State: Iowa
- County: Audubon

Area
  - Total: 0.76 sq mi (1.97 km^{2})
  - Land: 0.76 sq mi (1.97 km^{2})
  - Water: 0 sq mi (0.00 km^{2})
- Elevation: 1,286 ft (392 m)

Population (2020)
  - Total: 291
  - Density: 382.1/sq mi (147.52/km^{2})
- Time zone: UTC-6 (Central (CST))
  - Summer (DST): UTC-5 (CDT)
- ZIP code: 51543
- Area code: 712
- FIPS code: 19-41295
- GNIS feature ID: 2395531

Kimballton is a city in Audubon County, Iowa, United States. The population was 291 at the time of the 2020 census.

== History ==
Kimballton was founded in 1883 when Hans Jensen Jorgensen opened a post office at the site. The town was officially established in 1888, and incorporated in 1908. The town is named for a railroad employee, Edward Kimball.

There are eight sites in or near Kimballton listed on the National Register of Historic Places.

== Geography ==
According to the United States Census Bureau, the city has a total area of 0.77 square miles (1.99 km^{2}), all of it land.

Kimballton lies 3 miles (4.8 km) north of Elk Horn, 13 miles (21 km) east of Harlan, and roughly 60 miles (roughly 95 km) east of Omaha.

== Demographics ==
Historical populations
| Year | Pop. | ±% |
|---|---|---|
| 1910 | 271 | — |
| 1920 | 382 | +41.0% |
| 1930 | 378 | −1.0% |
| 1940 | 349 | −7.7% |
| 1950 | 428 | +22.6% |
| 1960 | 380 | −11.2% |
| 1970 | 343 | −9.7% |
| 1980 | 362 | +5.5% |
| 1990 | 289 | −20.2% |
| 2000 | 342 | +18.3% |
| 2010 | 322 | −5.8% |
| 2020 | 291 | −9.6% |
Source:"U.S. Census website". United States Census Bureau. and Iowa Data Center; Source: U.S. Decennial Census

=== 2020 census ===
As of the census of 2020, there were 291 people, 138 households, and 81 families residing in the city. The population density was 382.1 inhabitants per square mile (147.5/km^{2}). There were 155 housing units at an average density of 203.5 per square mile (78.6/km^{2}). The racial makeup of the city was 97.6% White, 0.0% Black or African American, 0.0% Native American, 0.0% Asian, 0.0% Pacific Islander, 0.3% from other races and 2.1% from two or more races. Hispanic or Latino persons of any race comprised 0.3% of the population.

Of the 138 households, 23.9% of which had children under the age of 18 living with them, 42.0% were married couples living together, 10.9% were cohabitating couples, 26.1% had a female householder with no spouse or partner present and 21.0% had a male householder with no spouse or partner present. 41.3% of all households were non-families. 31.9% of all households were made up of individuals, 15.9% had someone living alone who was 65 years old or older.

The median age in the city was 50.1 years. 23.7% of the residents were under the age of 20; 3.1% were between the ages of 20 and 24; 19.6% were from 25 and 44; 28.9% were from 45 and 64; and 24.7% were 65 years of age or older. The gender makeup of the city was 47.1% male and 52.9% female.

=== 2010 census ===
As of the census of 2010, there were 322 people, 145 households, and 95 families living in the city. The population density was 418.2 inhabitants per square mile (161.5/km^{2}). There were 157 housing units at an average density of 203.9 per square mile (78.7/km^{2}). The racial makeup of the city was 97.8% White, 0.3% Native American, 0.9% Asian, 0.3% from other races, and 0.6% from two or more races.

There were 145 households, of which 25.5% had children under the age of 18 living with them, 55.9% were married couples living together, 6.9% had a female householder with no husband present, 2.8% had a male householder with no wife present, and 34.5% were non-families. 31.7% of all households were made up of individuals, and 13.1% had someone living alone who was 65 years of age or older. The average household size was 2.22 and the average family size was 2.78.

The median age in the city was 47.1 years. 21.1% of residents were under the age of 18; 6.5% were between the ages of 18 and 24; 18.7% were from 25 to 44; 31.6% were from 45 to 64; and 22% were 65 years of age or older. The gender makeup of the city was 48.8% male and 51.2% female.

=== 2000 census ===
As of the census of 2000, there were 342 people, 151 households, and 94 families living in the city. The population density was 450.0 inhabitants per square mile (173.7/km^{2}). There were 161 housing units at an average density of 211.9 per square mile (81.8/km^{2}). The racial makeup of the city was 99.12% White, 0.29% Native American, and 0.58% from two or more races.

There were 151 households, out of which 29.1% had children under the age of 18 living with them, 57.0% were married couples living together, 2.6% had a female householder with no husband present, and 37.1% were non-families. 35.1% of all households were made up of individuals, and 19.9% had someone living alone who was 65 years of age or older. The average household size was 2.26 and the average family size was 2.88.

In the city, the population was spread out, with 24.9% under the age of 18, 5.8% from 18 to 24, 24.6% from 25 to 44, 21.3% from 45 to 64, and 23.4% who were 65 years of age or older. The median age was 40 years. For every 100 females, there were 86.9 males. For every 100 females age 18 and over, there were 91.8 males.

The median income for a household in the city was $32,188, and the median income for a family was $37,125. Males had a median income of $26,932 versus $16,364 for females. The per capita income for the city was $13,514. About 11.2% of families and 11.9% of the population were below the poverty line, including 12.2% of those under age 18 and 16.4% of those age 65 or over.

== Education ==
It is served by the Exira–Elk Horn–Kimballton Community School District. The former Elk Horn–Kimballton Community School District consolidated effective July 1, 2014.

== Culture ==
Kimballton has a large population of Danish ancestry. The Danish community prides itself on its customs, traditions, and ethnicity. Some local citizens still speak Danish periodically. Also, many Danish traditions are carried on in Kimballton, such as Danish folk dancing. The Kimballton Danes have long enjoyed performing their authentic Danish folk dances for large crowds. In addition, Kimballton Danes share a part of their heritage by cooking Æbleskiver, a Danish pancake, at various times of the year.

== Notable people ==
- Jan Jensen, the head coach of the Iowa Hawkeyes women's basketball team.
- Clark R. Rasmussen, member of the Iowa House of Representatives
