= List of churches in the Diocese of Des Moines =

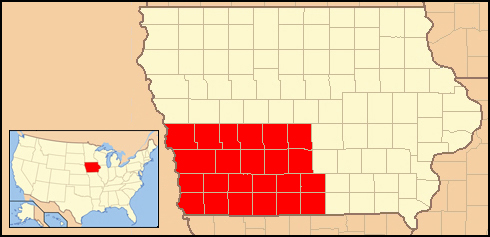
Diocese of Des Moines in red

This is a list of current and former Roman Catholic churches in the Roman Catholic Diocese of Des Moines. The diocese includes more than 80 churches located throughout southwestern Iowa. The cathedral church of the diocese is St. Ambrose Cathedral in Des Moines.

== Des Moines Region ==
Name	Image	Location	Description/Notes
Ss. John and Paul		1401 1st Ave S, Altoona	Founded in 1983, current church dedicated in 1985
Our Lady's Immaculate Heart		510 E. First St, Ankeny	
St. Luke the Evangelist		1102 NW Weigel Dr, Ankeny	Founded in 2010, current church dedicated in 2015
St. Elizabeth Seton		2566 Scotch Ridge Rd, Carlisle	Founded in the 1970s, current church dedicated in 1980
All Saints		650 NE 52nd Ave, Des Moines	Founded in 1914, current church dedicated in 1920
Basilica of St. John		1915 University Ave, Des Moines	Built 1913–1927; listed on National Register of Historic Places (NRHP)
Christ the King		5711 SW 9th St, Des Moines	Founded in 1939 and current church dedicated the same year
Holy Trinity		2926 Beaver Ave, Des Moines	Founded in 1920, current church started construction in 1957
Our Lady of the Americas		1271 E. 9th St, Des Moines	
St. Ambrose Cathedral		607 High St, Des Moines	Parish of St. Ambrose founded in 1856. Current church dedicated in 1891, became a cathedral in 1911; listed on NRHP
St. Anthony’s		15 Indianola Rd, Des Moines	Founded in 1906, current church dedicated in 1931
St. Augustin’s		545 42nd St, Des Moines	Built between 1922 and 1924; listed on NRHP
St. Catherine of Siena		1150 28th St, Des Moines	Founded in the 1940s as the Newman Center at Drake University; current building was dedicated in 1997
St. Joseph		3300 Easton Blvd, Des Moines	Founded in 1924, current church dedicated in 1979
St. Mary of Nazareth		4600 Meredith Dr, Des Moines	Founded in 1963, church dedicated in 1965
St. Peter		618 E 18th St, Des Moines	Founded for Vietnamese immigrants
St. Theresa		1230 Merle Hay Rd, Des Moines	Founded in 1950, current church dedicated in 1958
St. Mary		460 NW Washington Ave, Elkhart	
Assumption of the Blessed Virgin Mary		1906 Sycamore St, Granger	Original church built in 1901; current church dedicated in 1992
Holy Cross		12704 NE 98th St, Maxwell	
St. John the Apostle		720 Orchard Hills Dr, Norwalk	Founded in 1892 in Cumming as St. John Parish. Current church dedicated in Norwalk in 2005, parish became St. John the Apostle then
St. Pius X		3663 66th St, Urbandale	Founded in 1955, church dedicated in 1968
St. Boniface		1200 Warrior Lane, Waukee	
Sacred Heart		1627 Grand Ave, West Des Moines	Current church completed in 1967
St. Francis of Assisi		7075 Ashworth Rd, West Des Moines	Parish established in 1991; current church opened in 2000

== Adair Region ==
Name	Image	Location	Description/Notes
St. John		804 5th St, Adair	
St. John		24043 302nd Pl, Adel	Founded in the early 1900s, current church dedicated in 1969
SS. Peter and Paul-St Mary-Our Lady of Grace-St. Timothy Parish		St. Mary Church, 302 Chestnut St, Anita	Merger of three other churches
		105 W 6th St, Atlantic	Now merged with three other churches
		69488 Wichita Rd, Cumberland	Now merged with three other churches
		203 Adair St, Griswold	Now merged with three other churches
St. Patrick and Holy Trinity Churches		116 E. Division St, Audubon	Now merged with Holy Trinity Parish
		Holy Trinity Church, 208 Kilworth Street North, Exira	Now merged with St. Patrick Parish
St Mary-St. Patrick-St. Cecelia		214 Prairie St, Bayard	Merger of St. Mary and St. Cecilia Parishes
		St. Mary Church, 603 Main St, Guthrie Center	Now merged with St. Patrick and St. Cecilia Parishes
		St. Cecilia Church, 220 N. 1st St, Panora	Now merged with St. Mary and St. Patrick Parishes
St. John		303 NE Elm St, Greenfield	
St. Patrick		503 Main St, Massena	
St. Patrick’s		1312 Third St, Perry	Founded in the 1870s, current church dedicated in 1902; listed on NRHP

== Council Bluffs Region ==
Name	Image	Location	Description/Notes
Corpus Christi Parish		Our Lady of Carter Lake Church, 3501 N. 9th StCarter Lake	Founded in 1970. Became part of Corpus Christi Parish in 2011
		Queen of the Apostles Church, 3304 4th Ave, Council Bluffs	Became part of Corpus Christi Parish in 2011
St. Patrick		4 Valley View Dr, Council Bluffs	Founded in 1924, current church dedicated in 2018
St. Peter		1 Bluff St, Council Bluffs	Current church dedicated in 1887
Our Lady of the Holy Rosary		24116 Marian Ave, Glenwood	Current church dedicated in 1955
St. Patrick and St. Columbanus Parishes		St. Patrick Church, 308 4th St, Neola	Founded in 1882. Now merged with St. Columbanus Parish
		St. Columbanus Church, 22720 Weston Ave, Underwood	Now merged with St. Patrick Parish, Neola

== Osceola Region ==
Name	Image	Location	Description/Notes
Sacred Heart		407 N. Main St #401, Chariton	Founded as St. Mary Parish in 1869. Sacred Heart Church was dedicated in 1915
St. Patrick		504 Grove Ave, Corning	
St. Francis		213 W. Jackson St, Corydon	
Holy Spirit and St. Edward Parishes		Holy Spirit Church, 107 W. Howard St, Creston	Now merged with St. Edward Parish
		St. Edward Church, 104 W. Union St, Afton	Founded in the 1870s, current church dedicated in 1923. Now merged with St. Edward Parish
St. Bernard, St. Joseph and St. Patrick Church		St. Patrick Church, 460 Wabonsy St, Grand River	Now merged with St. Bernard and St. Joseph Parishes
		St. Bernard Church, 222 E Pearl St, Osceola	Now merged with St. Patrick and St. Joseph Parishes
		St. Joseph, Mt. Ayr	Now merged with St. Bernard and St. Patrick Parishes
St. Thomas Aquinas		210 S Wesley St, Indianola	Founded in the 1950s, current church dedicated in 1958
St. Patrick		3396 155th St, Cumming	Parish founded in 1855, church dedicated in 1868. Church was visited by Pope John Paul II in 1979. It is listed on NRHP
St. Mary of the Assumption		222 N. Washington Ave, Lacona	Founded in 1910, current church dedicated in 1911
St. Patrick		600 W. Michigan St, Lenox	Founded in the 1870s, church dedicated in 1916
St. Brendan		1007 NW Church St, Leon	Founded in 1865
St. Augustine		111 E Belmont St, Milo	Founded in 1915, current church dedicated in 1979
Immaculate Conception		101 St James St, St. Marys	Founded in 1870, current church dedicated in 1901
St. Joseph		1026 N 8th Ave, Winterset	Founded in the 1870s, current church dedicated in 1911

== Portsmouth Region ==
Name	Image	Location	Description/Notes
St. Mary/St. Patrick Parishes		St. Mary Church, 715 Hawthorne St, Avoca	Founded in the mid 1870s. Now merged with St. Patrick church
		St. Patrick Church, 718 Antique City Dr, Walnut	Founded in the mid-1870s. Now merged with St. Patrick church
St. Peter & St. Joseph Parish		St. Peter Church, 501 5th St, Defiance	Founded in the 1880s, current church dedicated in 1928. Now merged with St. Joseph Church
		St. Joseph Church 212 2nd St, Earling	Now merged with St. Peter Church
St. Patrick and Sacred Heart Parishes		St. Patrick Church, 312 S. 3rd St, Dunlap	Now merged with Sacred Heart Parish
		Sacred Heart Church, 33 7th St, Woodbine	Now merged with St. Patrick Parish
St. Michael		2001 College Pl, Harlan	Founded in 1888, current church dedicated in 1964
St. Anne		112 W 3rd St, Logan	
St. Patrick		215 N 7th St, Missouri Valley	Founded in 1882, current church dedicated in 1892
Holy Family		307 S. Mulberry St #2036, Mondamin	
St. Mary of the Assumption		208 St Marys Ave, Panama	
St. Mary, Our Lady of Fatima		502 4th St, Portsmouth	Church dedicated in 1951
St. Boniface		305 Duren St, Westphalia	Constructed in 1882; listed on NRHP

== Red Oak Region ==
Name	Image	Location	Description/Notes
St. Clare, St. Joseph and Sacred Heart Churches		St. Clare Church, 314 E Lincoln St, Clarinda	Now merged with Sacred Heart and St. Joseph Parishes
		Sacred Heart Heart Church, 707 Main St, Bedford	Now merged with St. Clare and St. Joseph Parishes
		St. Joseph Church, 131 W High St, Villisca	Now merged with Sacred Heart and St. Clare Parishes
St. Mary		1306 Washington StHamburg	Founded in 1874
St. Patrick		304 3rd St, Imogene	Founded as a mission in 1880, Current church constructed between 1915 and 1919; listed on NRHP
St. Mary		1510 Highland Ave, Red Oak	Founded in 1874, current church dedicated in 1963
St. Mary		512 W. Thomas Ave,Shenandoah	Founded in 1870

== Former churches ==
Name	Image	Location	Description/Notes
Historic All Saints		320 N Fremont St, Stuart	Church dedicated in 1910, was deconsecrated in 1995 after a large fire. Now operated as a cultural center. It is listed on NRHP
Holy Family		2217 Avenue B, Council Bluffs	Deconsecrated in 2024, church building to be sold
