= Great Western Trail (disambiguation) =

The Great Western Trail is a hiking trail in the western United States that extends from Canada to Mexico.

Great Western Trail may also refer to:

- Great Western Trail (Illinois)
- Great Western Trail (Iowa)
- Great Western Trail (board game)
- Great Western Cattle Trail
