= Martensdale, Iowa =

- City
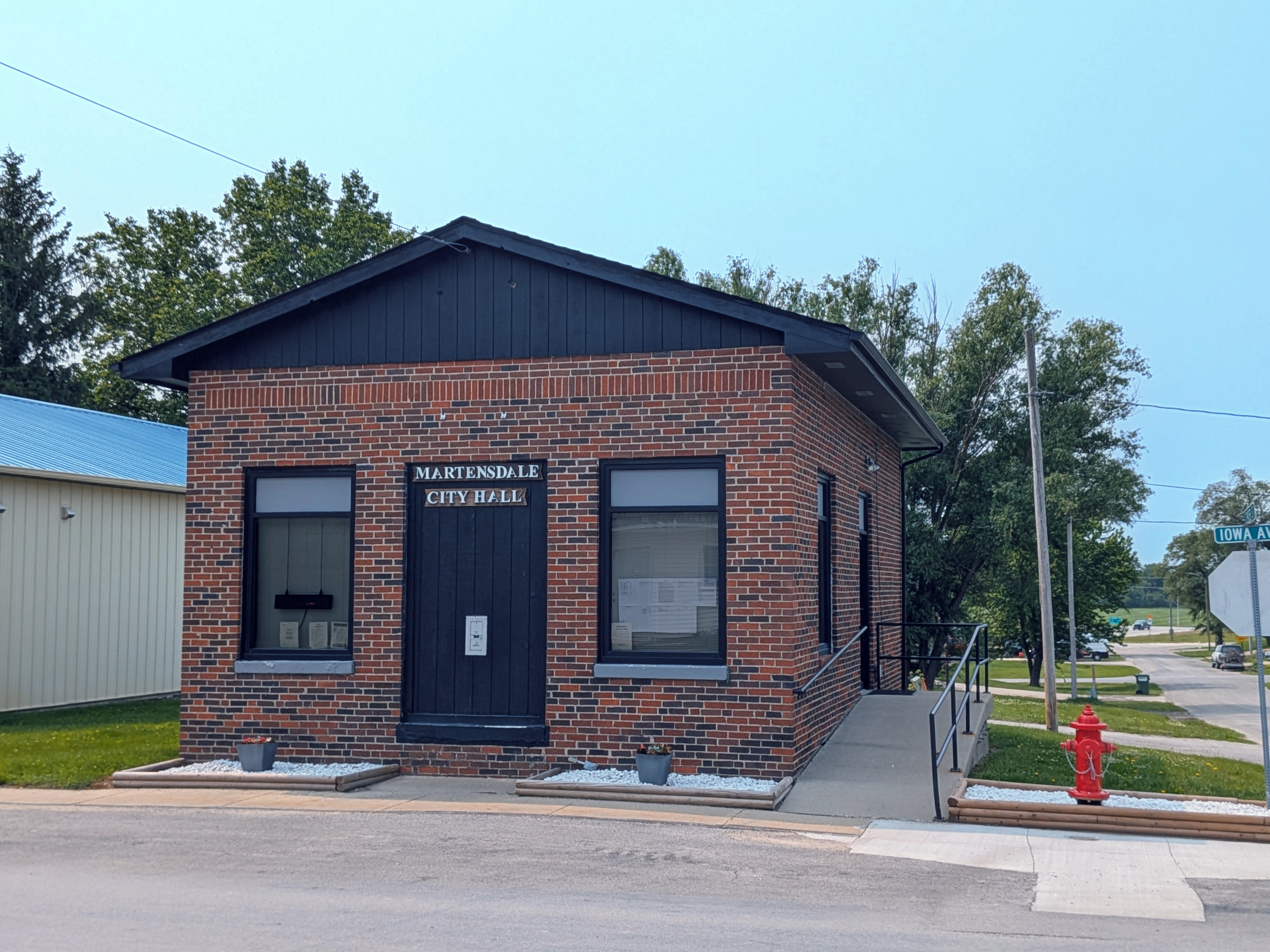
- Martensdale City Hall

- Location of Martensdale, Iowa
- Coordinates: 41°22′29″N 93°44′20″W
- Country: US
- State: Iowa
- County: Warren

Area
  - Total: 0.38 sq mi (0.98 km^{2})
  - Land: 0.38 sq mi (0.98 km^{2})
  - Water: 0 sq mi (0.00 km^{2})
- Elevation: 856 ft (261 m)

Population (2020)
  - Total: 421
  - Density: 1,107.9/sq mi (427.78/km^{2})
- Time zone: UTC-6 (Central (CST))
  - Summer (DST): UTC-5 (CDT)
- ZIP code: 50160
- Area code: 641
- FIPS code: 19-49890
- GNIS feature ID: 2395028
- Website: cityofmartensdale.com

Martensdale is a city in Warren County, Iowa, United States. The population was 421 at the time of the 2020 census. It is part of the Des Moines–West Des Moines Metropolitan Statistical Area.

== Geography ==
Martensdale is located along the Middle River. According to the United States Census Bureau, the city has a total area of 0.40 square miles (1.04 km^{2}), all of it land.

The Great Western Trail has its southern terminus in Martensdale.

== Demographics ==
Historical populations
| Year | Pop. | ±% |
|---|---|---|
| 1930 | 139 | — |
| 1940 | 172 | +23.7% |
| 1950 | 161 | −6.4% |
| 1960 | 316 | +96.3% |
| 1970 | 306 | −3.2% |
| 1980 | 438 | +43.1% |
| 1990 | 491 | +12.1% |
| 2000 | 467 | −4.9% |
| 2010 | 465 | −0.4% |
| 2020 | 421 | −9.5% |
Source:"U.S. Census website". United States Census Bureau. and Iowa Data Center; Source: U.S. Decennial Census

=== 2020 census ===
As of the census of 2020, there were 421 people, 179 households, and 122 families residing in the city. The population density was 1,108.0 inhabitants per square mile (427.8/km^{2}). There were 185 housing units at an average density of 486.9 per square mile (188.0/km^{2}). The racial makeup of the city was 94.1% White, 0.2% Black or African American, 0.0% Native American, 0.0% Asian, 0.0% Pacific Islander, 0.0% from other races and 5.7% from two or more races. Hispanic or Latino persons of any race comprised 1.4% of the population.

Of the 179 households, 35.8% of which had children under the age of 18 living with them, 47.5% were married couples living together, 10.1% were cohabitating couples, 26.8% had a female householder with no spouse or partner present and 15.6% had a male householder with no spouse or partner present. 31.8% of all households were non-families. 23.5% of all households were made up of individuals, 10.6% had someone living alone who was 65 years old or older.

The median age in the city was 38.8 years. 25.4% of the residents were under the age of 20; 7.4% were between the ages of 20 and 24; 25.4% were from 25 and 44; 22.3% were from 45 and 64; and 19.5% were 65 years of age or older. The gender makeup of the city was 52.3% male and 47.7% female.

=== 2010 census ===
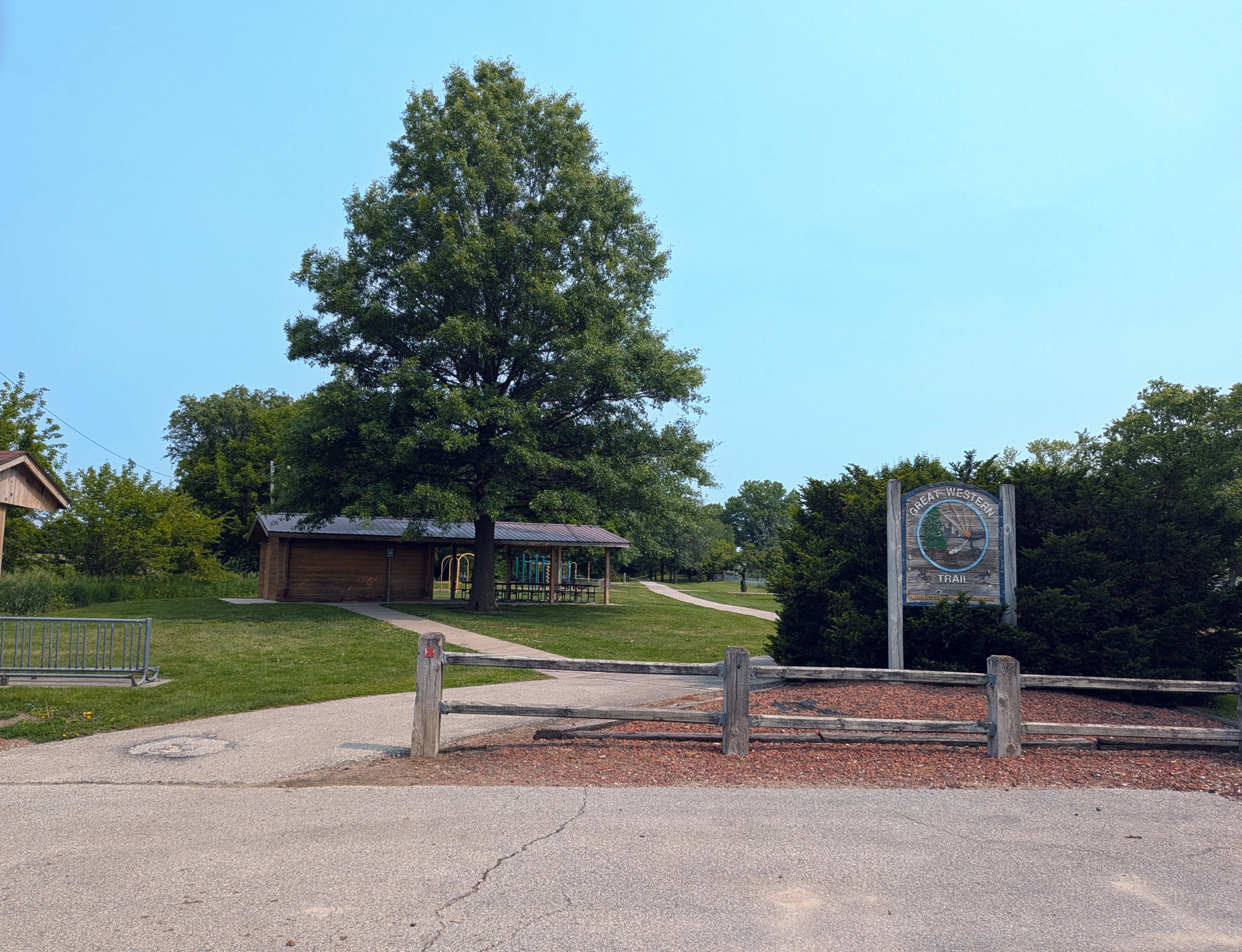
Entrance to the Great Western Trail, in Martensdale

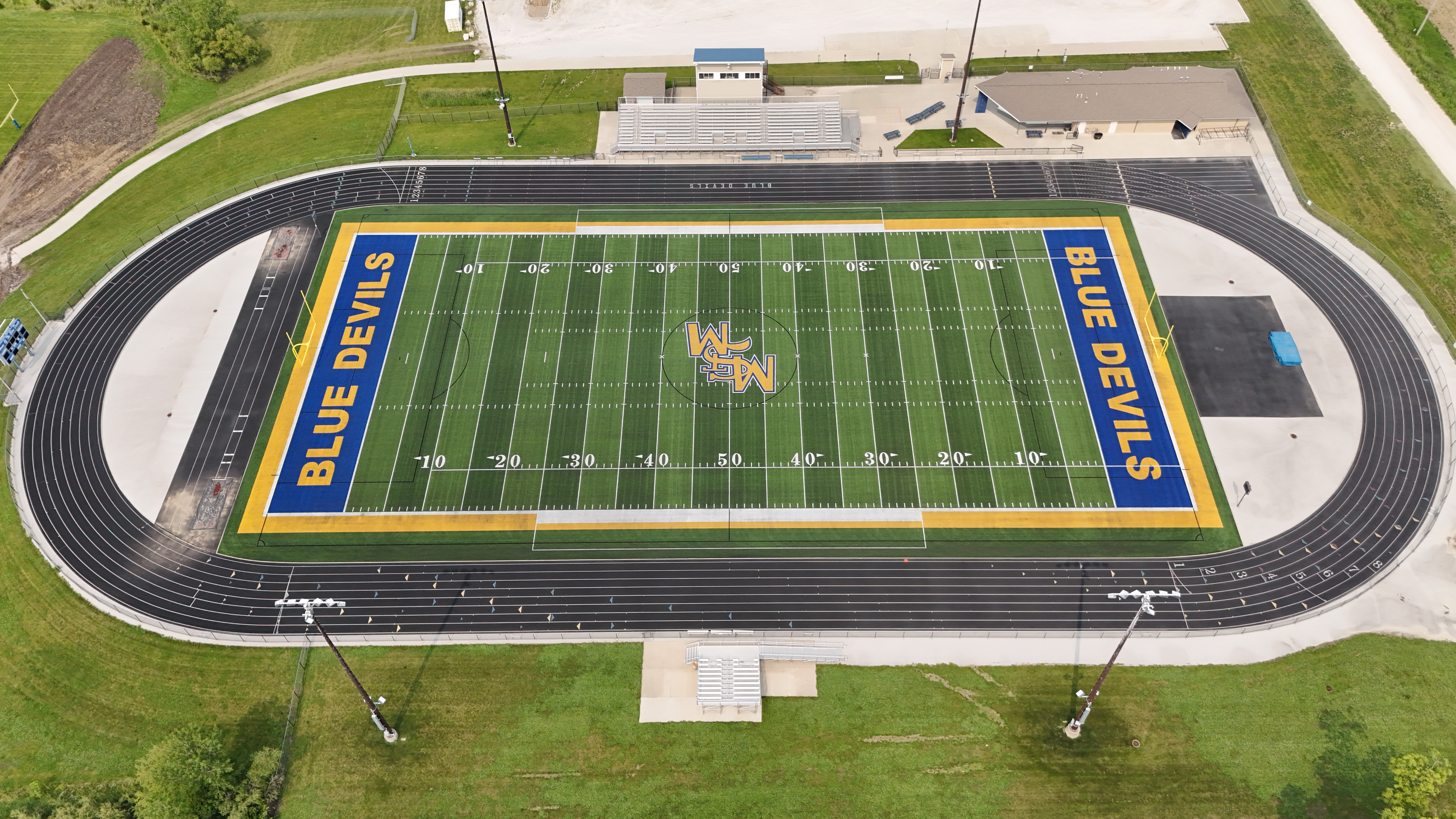
Blue Devils football field in Martensdale

As of the census of 2010, there were 465 people, 186 households, and 116 families living in the city. The population density was 1,162.5 inhabitants per square mile (448.8/km^{2}). There were 198 housing units at an average density of 495.0 per square mile (191.1/km^{2}). The racial makeup of the city was 98.5% White and 1.5% from two or more races. Hispanic or Latino of any race were 1.9% of the population.

There were 186 households, of which 36.6% had children under the age of 18 living with them, 49.5% were married couples living together, 9.1% had a female householder with no husband present, 3.8% had a male householder with no wife present, and 37.6% were non-families. 30.6% of all households were made up of individuals, and 12.9% had someone living alone who was 65 years of age or older. The average household size was 2.50 and the average family size was 3.21.

The median age in the city was 34.6 years. 28% of residents were under the age of 18; 8.6% were between the ages of 18 and 24; 25.6% were from 25 to 44; 25.6% were from 45 to 64; and 12.3% were 65 years of age or older. The gender makeup of the city was 51.4% male and 48.6% female.

=== 2000 census ===
As of the census of 2000, there were 467 people, 174 households, and 129 families living in the city. The population density was 1,236.3 inhabitants per square mile (477.3/km^{2}). There were 181 housing units at an average density of 479.2 per square mile (185.0/km^{2}). The racial makeup of the city was 98.50% White, 0.43% Native American, 0.21% Pacific Islander, 0.21% from other races, and 0.64% from two or more races. Hispanic or Latino of any race were 1.71% of the population.

There were 174 households, out of which 38.5% had children under the age of 18 living with them, 60.3% were married couples living together, 8.0% had a female householder with no husband present, and 25.3% were non-families. 23.0% of all households were made up of individuals, and 8.0% had someone living alone who was 65 years of age or older. The average household size was 2.68 and the average family size was 3.15.

In the city, the population was spread out, with 29.3% under the age of 18, 6.6% from 18 to 24, 31.7% from 25 to 44, 18.8% from 45 to 64, and 13.5% who were 65 years of age or older. The median age was 36 years. For every 100 females, there were 89.8 males. For every 100 females age 18 and over, there were 96.4 males.

The median income for a household in the city was $41,250, and the median income for a family was $50,833. Males had a median income of $40,441 versus $23,438 for females. The per capita income for the city was $16,638. About 4.0% of families and 4.5% of the population were below the poverty line, including 4.2% of those under age 18 and 6.6% of those age 65 or over.
