= St. Anthony's Catholic Church (Des Moines, Iowa) =

- St. Anthony's Church
- U.S. National Register of Historic Places
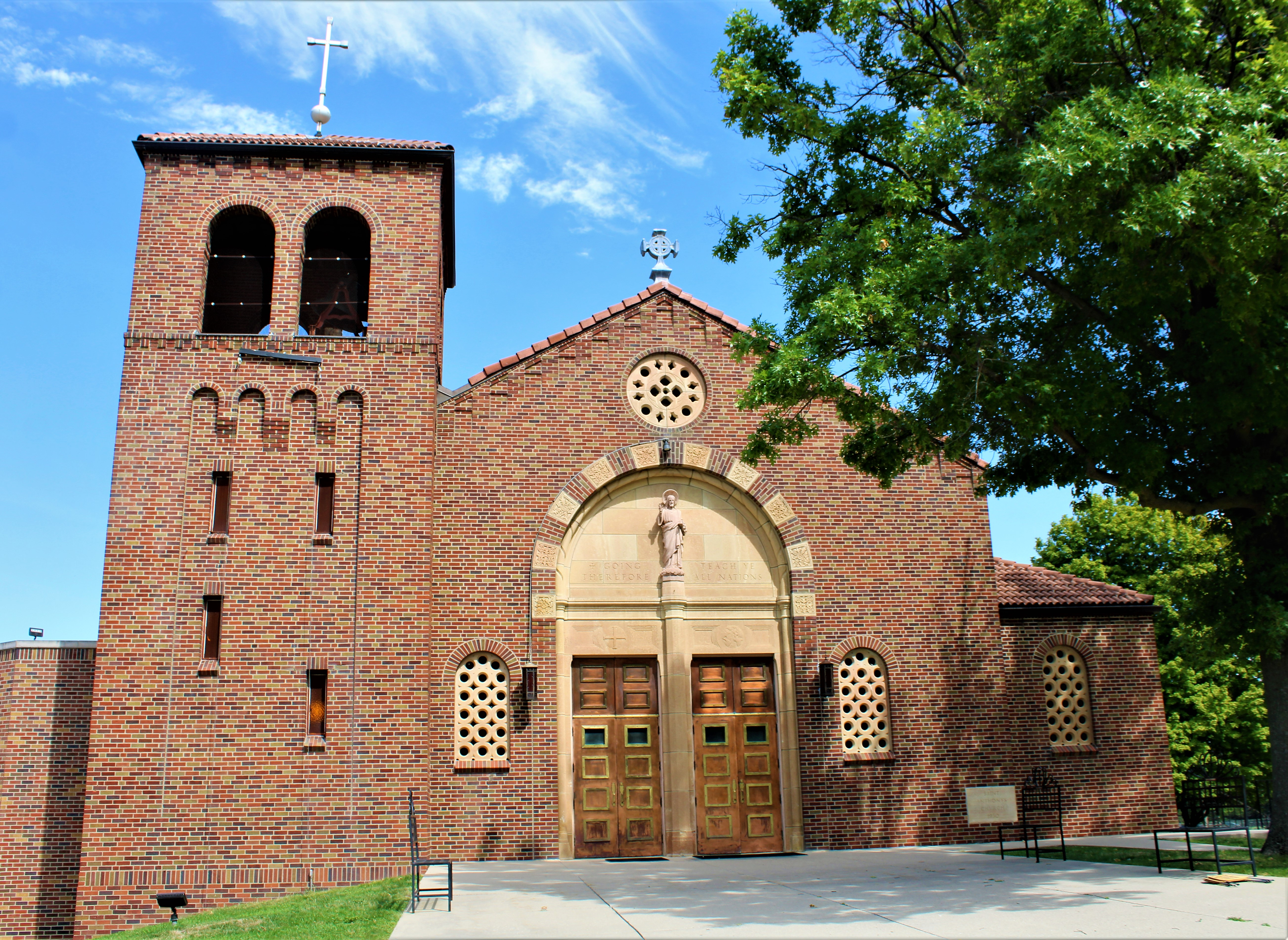
- St. Anthony's Church in 2022

- Location within Iowa Location within the United States
- Location: 15 Indianola Rd. Des Moines, Iowa
- Coordinates: 41°34′20.8″N 93°37′02″W
- Architectural style: Romanesque Revival
- NRHP reference No.: 100006734
- Added to NRHP: July 20, 2021

St. Anthony's Catholic Church is a Catholic parish church in the Diocese of Des Moines located on the south side of Des Moines, Iowa, United States. It was listed on the National Register of Historic Places in 2021.

== History ==
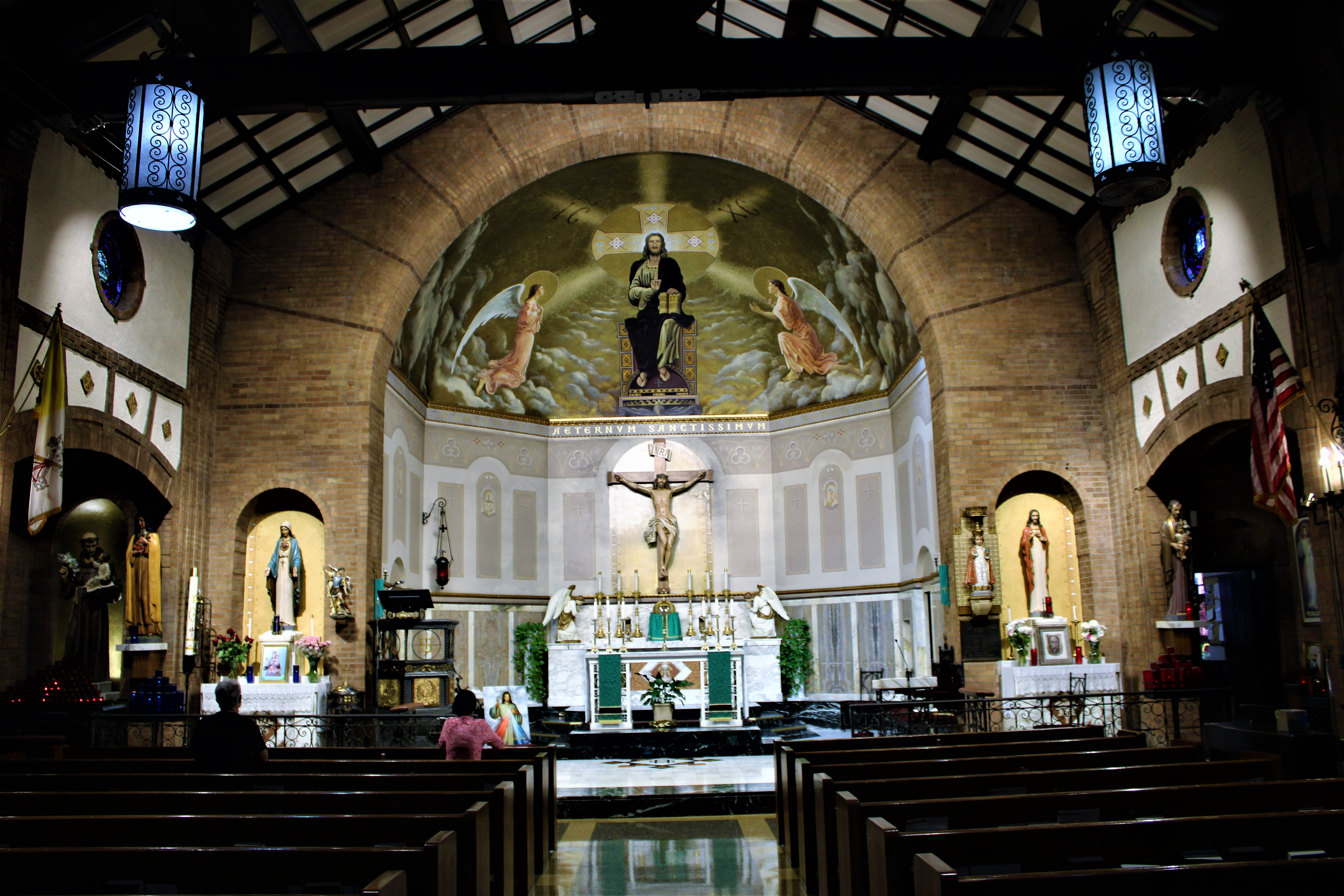
Church interior

The first Italian immigrants arrived in Des Moines in the 1870s, with most arriving between 1880 and 1915. They followed the streetcar lines to areas south of the Raccoon River. Davenport Bishop Henry Cosgrove appointed the Rev. Francis Leonard to found St. Anthony's parish in 1898, but difficulties arose and the project came to an end. In 1906, Cosgrove assigned the Rev. Victor Romanelli to found the parish on Des Moines' south side. Romanelli was a native of Naples and had served parishes in New York and New Jersey. He acquired an old fire station where he resided and where the parish's first Mass was celebrated on August 19. Property was acquired on Columbus Avenue and a small brick church was built there. The Rev. Michael Flavin, the pastor of St. Ambrose Church opposed the establishment of the parish and incorrectly insisted it was established as an Italian ethnic parish because he did not want to lose the parish territory or income. The Des Moines Diocese was established in 1911 and St. Anthony's transferred to the new diocese. A second floor was added to the church building and the parish school was opened in 1912 with the Congregation of the Humility of Mary providing the faculty. By 1956 it was the largest school in the diocese. The present brick Romanesque Revival church was built in 1931 during the pastorate of the Rev. Cornelius Lalley (1928-1955).
