= St. Patrick's Catholic Church (Perry, Iowa) =

Historic place in Iowa, United States

- St. Patrick's Catholic Church and Rectory
- U.S. National Register of Historic Places
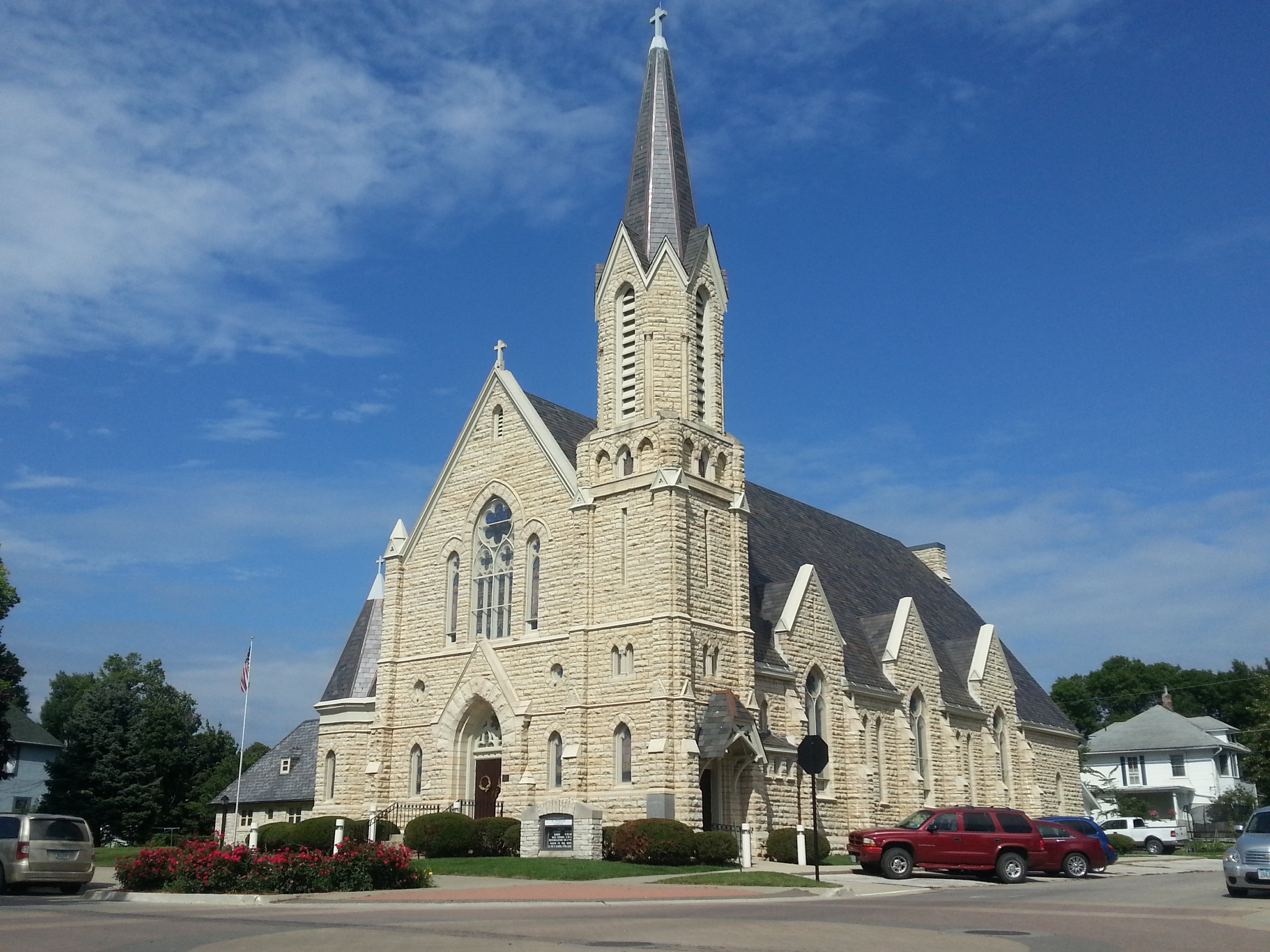

- Location within Iowa Location within the United States
- Location: 1312 Third St., Perry, Iowa
- Coordinates: 41°50′27″N 94°06′12″W
- Area: <1 acre (0.4 ha)
- Built: 1901–1902
- Built by: McCavick and Squires; Ringland Johnson
- Architect: George Stauduhar; Amos Emery
- Architectural style: Gothic Revival
- NRHP reference No.: 11000138
- Added to NRHP: March 22, 2011

St. Patrick's Catholic Church is a historic Catholic church located in Perry, Iowa, United States. The parish is part of the Diocese of Des Moines. The church building, which is built of stone in the Gothic Revival style, and the rectory were listed on the National Register of Historic Places in 2011.

== History ==
The Rev. James Brazil from St. Ambrose Church in Des Moines offered the first Mass in Perry in 1871. He and other priests celebrated Mass in the homes of Catholic people in town. The property at the corner of Third and Lucinda streets was purchased in 1874 and a small frame building was constructed for a church. At the time it was part of the Diocese of Dubuque. Father Brazil celebrated the first mass in the new church, and the Rev. Charles Toner became the parish's first pastor the same year. The parish became part of the Diocese of Davenport when it was established in 1881. As the Catholic community increased in size the church became too small. Plans were drawn up for a red brick church that was completed in 1883.

By the time the Rev. James Cleary became the pastor in 1898 the second church was also becoming too crowded. The parish voted to build a third church in 1900. It was designed by Rock Island, Illinois architect George Stauduhar in the Late Gothic Revival style. He was responsible for designing over 200 churches between 1890 and 1928. The old church was taken down by Hollenbeck and Sons of Des Moines before the new church could be built. The cornerstone was laid in 1901 and it was completed the following year by McCavick and Squires of Marshalltown, Iowa.

The parish joined the Diocese of Des Moines when it was established in 1911. Renovations to the church were done in 1930, 1940, 1954, and 1980. The most recent interior renovations were undertaken from 1993 to 1999. The original slate roof was replaced by an asbestos shingle roof around 1970. In 2010 it was replaced by a new slate roof. The old frame rectory was replaced by a 1½-story concrete block structure with a Lannon stone veneer. It was designed by Des Moines architect Amos Emery and built by Ringland Johnson of Des Moines.

== Architecture ==
The church building is largely rectangular in shape measuring 105 by 55 feet (32 m × 17 m), with a 98-foot (30 m) bell tower. The hexagonal structure on the north side of the main facade originally housed the baptistry. Its exterior walls are composed of Stone City limestone. Above the main entrance is a large pointed arch window flanked by two smaller pointed arch windows. Buttresses divide the side elevations into seven bays. The nave is marked by stained glass windows that alternate down each side elevation. Larger windows are located in the bays with wall dormers. The bays in between have paired lancet windows. The back wall is flat, concealing the rounded apse within.

The interior features a 37-foot (11 m) rib vaulted ceiling that is supported by ten heavy hardwood hammer beams. The beams are embellished with trefoil, quatrefoil, and circular tracery. A large pointed arch frames the main altar area, and it is flanked by two smaller arches that frame the side altars. The side altar on the right has a statue of the Blessed Virgin Mary, and the one the left a statue of the Sacred Heart of Jesus. On the apse ceiling are paintings of nine saints added during the 1954 renovation. They cover what had been windows. The columns that frame the arches are adorned with capitals in the Corinthian order.

The modified U-shaped rectory is connected toward the back of the church's west elevation by a hyphen. Its main entrance is on the west elevation facing a large yard. The stone and the steeply pitched slate roof were designed the match the church. The building provides living space for the priest in one section and office space for the parish in another.
