= St. Patrick's Church (Cumming, Iowa) =

- St. Patrick’s Church
- U.S. National Register of Historic Places
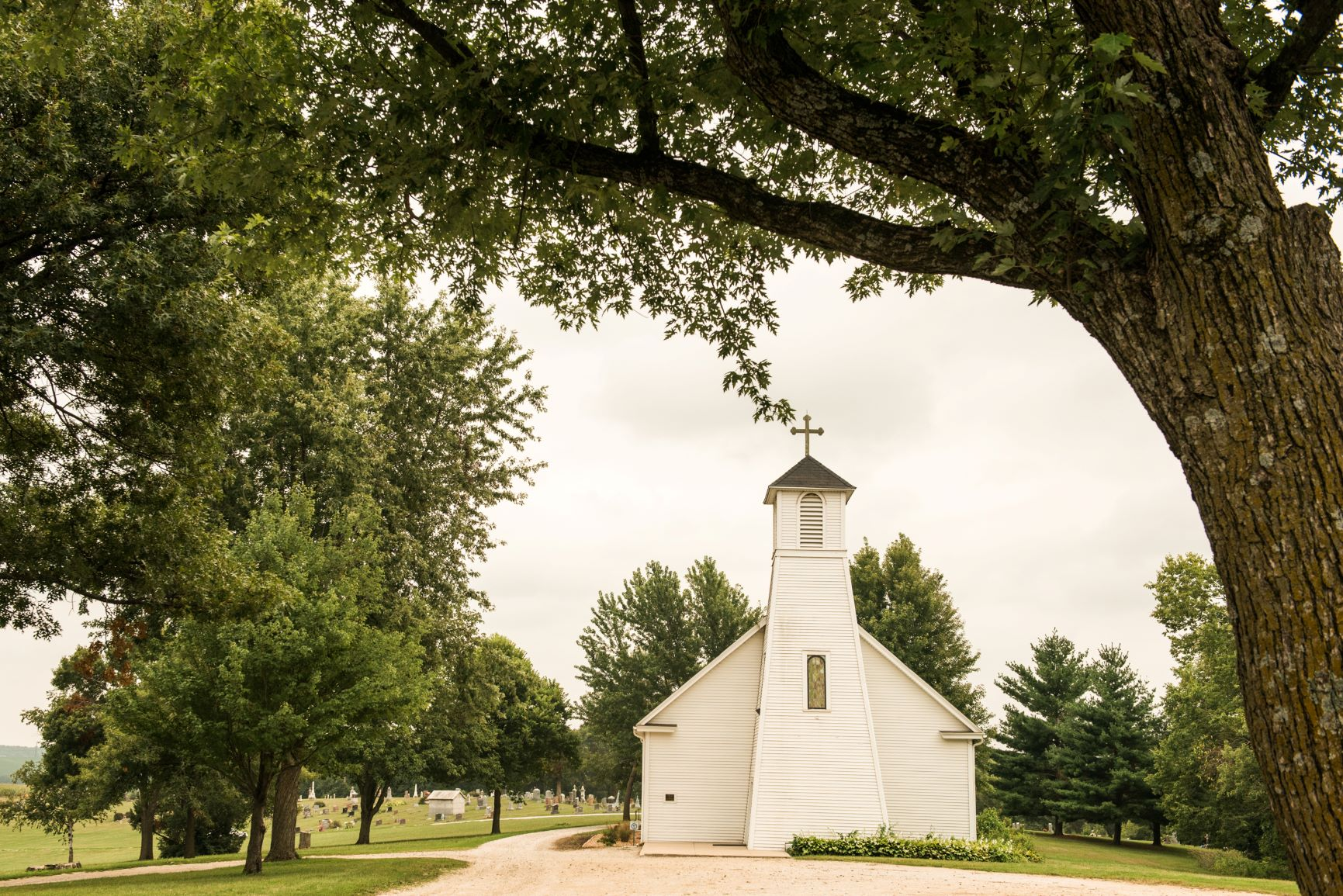
- Front view of the church

- Location within Iowa Location within the United States
- Location: Southwest of Cumming, Iowa
- Coordinates: 41°25′39″N 93°47′34″W
- Area: 20 acres (8.1 ha)
- Built: 1868
- NRHP reference No.: 78001245
- Added to NRHP: December 12, 1978

St. Patrick's Catholic Church is a parish church in the Diocese of Des Moines. The church was built in 1868 and is located southwest of the town of Cumming in rural Madison County, Iowa, United States. It was listed on the National Register of Historic Places in 1978. Pope John Paul II visited the church while he was on his first pastoral visit to the United States in 1979. The town that was associated with the church was called Irish Settlement, which flourished during the 1850s to around 1900.

== History ==
The significance of St. Patrick's Church is its association with the area that became known as Irish Settlement. This rural farm community was settled in the early 1850s by Irish immigrants. It was established by the Rev. Timothy Mullen, who had been sent by Bishop Mathias Loras of the Dubuque diocese to Fort Des Moines to serve the small Catholic community there. He was also to establish an Irish colony in central Iowa, similar to several that had already begun in Eastern Iowa. The first 40 acres (16 ha) were purchased by Bishop Loras. Many of the early families who settled here came from Wisconsin. By 1860, Irish Settlement covered four townships in two counties. Forty of the families resided in Madison County and by 1870 they had increased to 63 families.

There was a rivalry between those who settled on the north side of the North River and those who settled on the south side as to who would get the church. The parish was founded in 1852 with the church on the north side. It was the first parish founded in what would become the Diocese of Des Moines. A log structure served as the first church, which was begun by Mullen but finished by Rev. John Kreckel. Itinerant priests served the parish in its early years. The Rev. Francis McCormick was appointed the first resident pastor in 1857, but he did not stay long. The Rev. John Brazill of St. Ambrose Church in Des Moines had the present frame church built to replace the original log structure in 1868. A monument in the parish cemetery commemorates the old church on the site where it stood. St. Patrick's became a parish in the Davenport diocese when it was established in 1881. The parish was divided in 1884 at the North River with the parishioners who lived to the south forming a new parish at Churchville. Other divisions happened soon after that when parishes were begun at St. Mary's and in Winterset. The parish was transferred to the Des Moines diocese when it was created in 1911.

=== Pope John Paul II visits ===
The idea for a visit by Pope John Paul II to a rural church was initiated by Archbishop Paul Marcinkus, an American who worked at the Vatican. Des Moines Bishop Maurice Dingman brought him to visit St. Patrick's when they were planning the trip. The parish had been without a pastor so Dingman named a recently ordained priest, Rev. John Richter, to the position. The papal visit took place on October 4, 1979. Pope John Paul led a prayer service for 200 parishioners and gave a reflection based on the Acts of the Apostles "that spoke of the gathering for the breaking of the bread and prayers." He also urged them to maintain unity with the diocese and the wider Church. After his visit to St. Patrick's, the pope celebrated Mass at Living History Farms near Des Moines.

== Architecture ==
St. Patrick's Church is a frame structure that measures 66 by 34 feet (20 by 10 m), and it has a 24-by-12-foot (7.3 by 3.7 m) sacristy attached to the back. It is five bays in length with a round-arch Stained glass window in each bay. A small rose window is located above the altar. A low-pitched gable roof with partially-returned cornices caps the sanctuary. The building has a uniquely tapered bell tower in the front. The bell-chamber has a round-arch louver on each side and it is capped with a hipped roof and a cross. The church is surrounded by 20 acres (8.1 ha) of property that includes, timber, grassland, cultivated fields, and the parish cemetery where many of the first parishioners were laid to rest.
