= St. Peter's Catholic Church (Council Bluffs, Iowa) =

- St. Peter’s Church and Rectory
- U.S. National Register of Historic Places
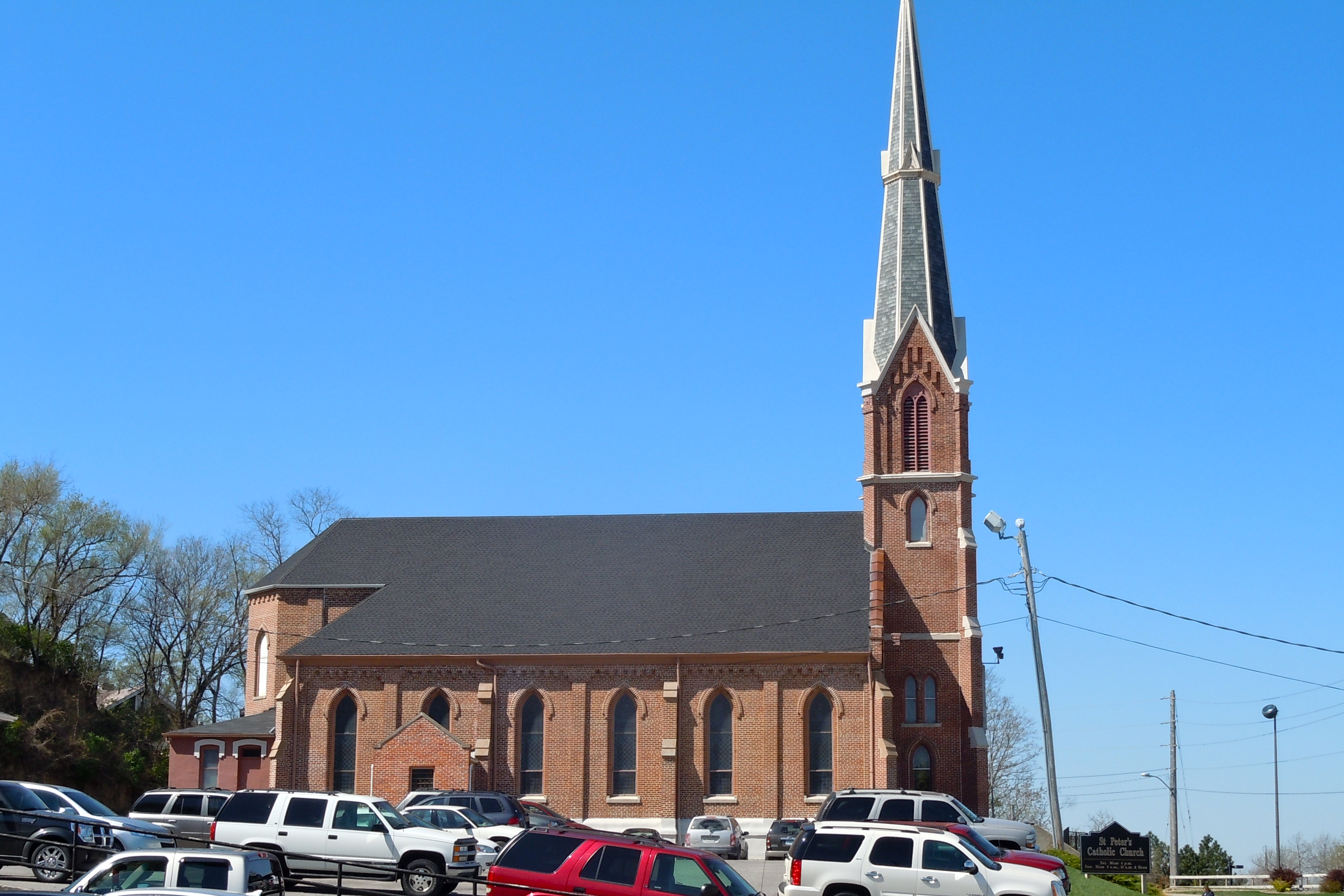

- Location within Iowa Location within the United States
- Location: 1 Bluff St. Council Bluffs, Iowa
- Coordinates: 41°15′37.1″N 95°50′51.7″W
- Area: less than one acre
- Built: 1887 (church); 1895 (rectory)
- Built by: Wickham Bros.
- Architect: Mathias Schnell
- Architectural style: Gothic Revival
- NRHP reference No.: 92000923
- Added to NRHP: July 24, 1992

St. Peter's Catholic Church is a parish of the Diocese of Des Moines. The church is located in Council Bluffs, Iowa, United States. It was listed on the National Register of Historic Places in 1992 as St. Peter's Church and Rectory.

== History ==
St. Peter's Parish traces its roots to a group of German women who formed an organization in 1884 to raise money for a Catholic church to serve the German community of Council Bluffs. The organization collected 25 cents monthly from each member. At the time they belonged to the predominantly Irish St. Francis Xavier Parish. The German Catholic men organized themselves in 1886 in order to support the establishment of their own parish. Bishop Henry Cosgrove of the Diocese of Davenport, and the Rev. B.P. McMenony from St. Francis Xavier both approved of the plan. The parish was formed on April 25, 1887. It was served by Benedictine monks from St. Benedict's Abbey in Atchison, Kansas, as there was a shortage of German-speaking priests at that time in the Davenport diocese.

Rock Island, Illinois architect Mathias Schnell designed the church, and Wickham Brothers of Council Bluffs was responsible for its construction. It was completed in 1887 for $11,126. The following year the men of the parish built a frame schoolhouse for the parochial school. By the end of 1888, a frame convent was built for the Benedictine Sisters who taught in the school. Both of these buildings were replaced in 1924 with a brick, combination school building and convent. The brick rectory next to the church was completed for the Benedictine priests in 1895. Wickham Brothers was also responsible for building the rectory.

St. Peter's became a parish in the Diocese of Des Moines when it was formed in 1911. St. Peter's along with St. Mary's in Des Moines (no longer extant) were the only two ethnic parishes, meaning non-territorial, in the diocese. They both served German congregations. St. Peter's status as an ethnic parish ended in 1974 when Bishop Maurice Dingman merged it with St. Francis Xavier Parish. The St. Francis church building was taken down while the St. Peter's building was maintained for the merged parish. The clergy from the Des Moines diocese took over from the Benedictines in 1975. The church and rectory were placed on the National Register of Historic Places on July 24, 1992.

== Architecture ==
The church building is a late 19th-century Gothic Revival structure. It features a symmetrical facade on the gable end and a 100 feet (30 m) central bell tower capped with a spire. The side elevations are six bays long and are divided by alternating buttresses and pilasters. Lancet windows are located in the center of each bay. The apsidal end of the church features three lancet windows located high in the walls. Brick corbeling is located at the cornice level. The only alteration to the exterior was the addition of a handicap entrance. The interior is divided in three naves, separated by columns. In 2001 the interior of the church was renovated and the statues and frescoes were embellished. A new parish hall was completed in 1999 and the office addition was completed in 2006.

The rectory is a 2½-story, brick residential building. It features a full-size porch on the front, segmental arched windows, a lunette window and a corbelled brick frieze. Between the church and the rectory is an Our Lady of Grace shrine constructed by the Rev. J.J. Hannan, S.J. around 1958.
