= St. Patrick Church (Imogene, Iowa) =

Church in Iowa, U.S.

- U.S. National Register of Historic Places
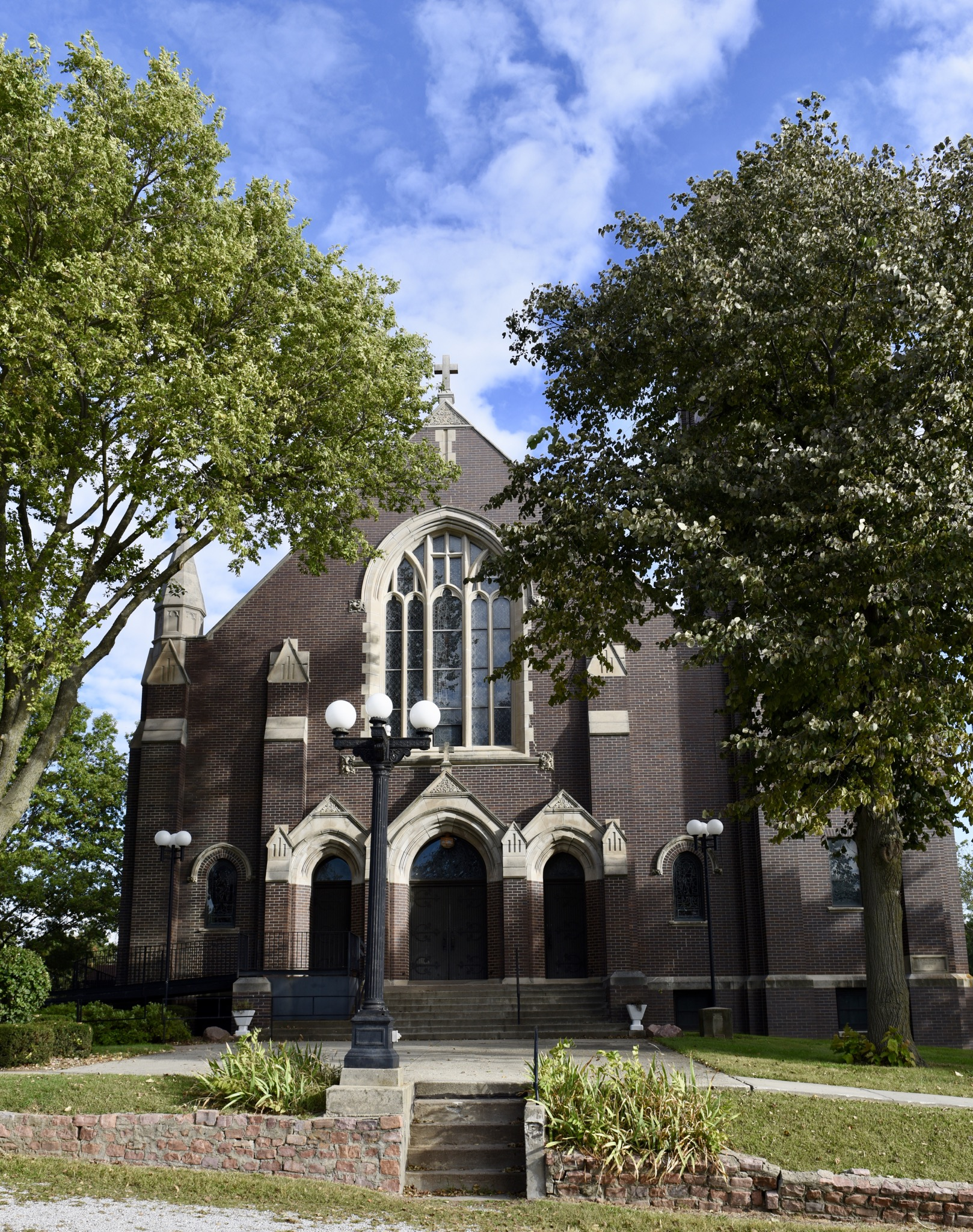

- Location within Iowa Location within the United States
- Location: 304 3rd Street; Imogene, Iowa
- Coordinates: 40°52′51″N 95°25′32″W
- Area: less than one acre
- Built: 1915-1919
- Architect: Harry Lawrie
- Architectural style: Late Gothic Revival; Romanesque Revival
- NRHP reference No.: 83000360
- Added to NRHP: July 7, 1983

St. Patrick Church is located in Imogene, Iowa, United States. It is a Catholic parish church in the Diocese of Des Moines. It was listed on the National Register of Historic Places in 1983.

== History ==
Irish immigrants began to settle this part of southwestern Iowa in 1869. The town of Imogene was incorporated ten years later. New Melleray Abbey near Dubuque, Iowa settled young Irish men in nearby Mills County to tend their herds of Black Angus cattle. After the cattle market went under the men stayed in the area to extend the railroad into this part of Iowa. The Rev. Gerald Stack arrived in 1876 to serve the Catholics in the area. He celebrated Mass in a schoolhouse southwest of Imogene. The first Mass in town was celebrated in the home of John Delehant. Father Stack organized St. Patrick's in 1880 as a mission of St. Mary's parish in Shenandoah, Iowa. At the time all of the state of Iowa was in the Diocese of Dubuque. A frame church was built in Imogene for $1,800 in 1881. That year all of southern Iowa, including Imogene, was placed in the newly established Diocese of Davenport. The property for Mount Calvary Cemetery was purchased south of town in 1883. Father Ryan died the following February and was one of the first people buried in the cemetery.

St. Patrick's became a parish in its own right in 1888 and the Rev. Edmund Hayes, a native of County Cork, was assigned as its first resident pastor the same year. Hayes was to have a profound effect on the parish and the town itself. He was referred to as the "best known Catholic priest in Iowa" and the "probably the best known minister in all southwestern Iowa of any denomination." Hayes was independently wealthy having inherited his wealth from his brother who had owned silver mines in Nevada and oil and gold in California. He invested a sizable portion of his wealth in Iowa farmland. A rectory was built soon after Hayes arrived and the original church was enlarged. It was replaced by a brick church in 1892 and a new rectory in 1904. A school, St. Patrick's Academy, was built in 1906. Hayes partially funded all of these projects himself. The parish became a part of the Diocese of Des Moines when it was established in 1911.

The church was destroyed in a fire on February 12, 1915. The only items salvaged was the bell and the Pietà. Omaha architect Harry Lawrie designed the present church, which was built by Ed and Jack Sprague, also of Omaha. Work was begun in August 1915 and completed on March 20, 1919. During construction Mass and other services were held in the Hibernian Hall until they could be held in the basement of the new church. The first Mass was held in the church basement on October 29, 1916. The church was wired for electricity when it was constructed even though it was not available yet in Imogene. The Carrara marble high altar and side altars, as well as the baptismal font, were donated by Father Hayes as a memorial to his family. They were all valued at $60,000-$90,000. Hayes had gone to Pietrasanta, Italy to place the order himself. The altars that were erected in the church, however, were Hayes' second choice. The first was on a ship sunk by the Germans during World War I. It took two years for Italian sculptor Enrico Tonnegetti and his crew to assemble the altars. After the church's debt was paid off it was dedicated on March 17, 1924.

In addition to his many contributions to St. Patrick's, Father Hayes' influence was felt in Imogene as well. He helped to bring electricity to the town, pledged money toward the street lights, and help found the town's waterworks and library. He died in St. Joseph's Hospital in Omaha in 1928 and was buried in Mount Calvary Cemetery.

== Architecture ==
St. Patrick's Church measures 130 by 65 feet (40 by 20 m) and its exterior is composed of Black Hylex St. Louis pressed brick. The exterior has features from both the Gothic Revival and the Romanesque Revival styles. The Gothic features are found in the pointed arched windows and door frames, the quoined stone surround of the large front window, the wall buttresses that flank the main entrance, and the stone trim on the gable. The hinges on the front doors are also executed in the Gothic style. The Romanesque features include the stone trim combined with its brick finish, the stone bands that form the water table, the wall buttresses with their decorative stone caps, the domed corner buttress, the corner tower capped with a battlement, and the projecting front pavilion with its multiple gables. There are similar bands from the water table at the cornice line that surrounds the tower. Other features of the exterior include a raised foundation, corbelling under the eaves, a rounded apse on the rear of the church and confessionals that project from the side elevations.

The interior features a single nave that is capped with an oak ceiling that rises 65 feet (20 m) above the floor. The ceiling is supported by six hammer beam trusses. The base of each truss is decorated with a quatrefoil circular infill. The Carrara marble high altar features a statue of Saint Patrick in its central tower. The side altar on the left features a statue of the Blessed Virgin Mary and the side altar on the left a statue of Saint Joseph. The altars and the reredoses behind them have a polished finish that contrasts with the rather dull finish of the statues. Across the front of the altar platform is an altar rail that is also executed in marble. The bronze gates in the center are a later addition. Stained glass windows line the nave walls. Love of God, country, and family is visibly displayed in the stained glass windows that adorn the church. The craftsmanship of the church windows was the creation of Italian glass masters which had been commissioned on behalf of families residing in Imogene. The Stations of the Cross are composed of mosaic and marble and are imported from Venice. The Pietà statue from the old church that was donated by Father Hayes in 1910 remains in the church.

== St. Patrick Academy ==
St. Patrick Academy was located on the north side of the church. When it opened on September 9, 1907, it had 100 students. Because of the large number of students, Father Hayes bought the former German Lutheran Church located across the street from St. Patrick's Church to house the first and second grades. The Sisters of Mercy taught in Imogene from 1907 to 1918. They were eventually replaced by Dominican Sisters who taught in the school from 1920 to 1969. The present convent was built across the street from the church in 1922 where the old Lutheran church had stood. That church had been torn down in 1919. St. Patrick Academy closed in 1969, and the Dominican's remained at St. Patrick's to organize and teach the parish's religious education program. The sisters left the parish in 1972 and the academy building was torn down the same year. Religious education classes were relocated into the former convent. It is now called the Faith Center.
