= Great Western Trail (Iowa) =

Rail trail in south-central Iowa, U.S.

Coordinates: 41.374109°N 93.745539°W

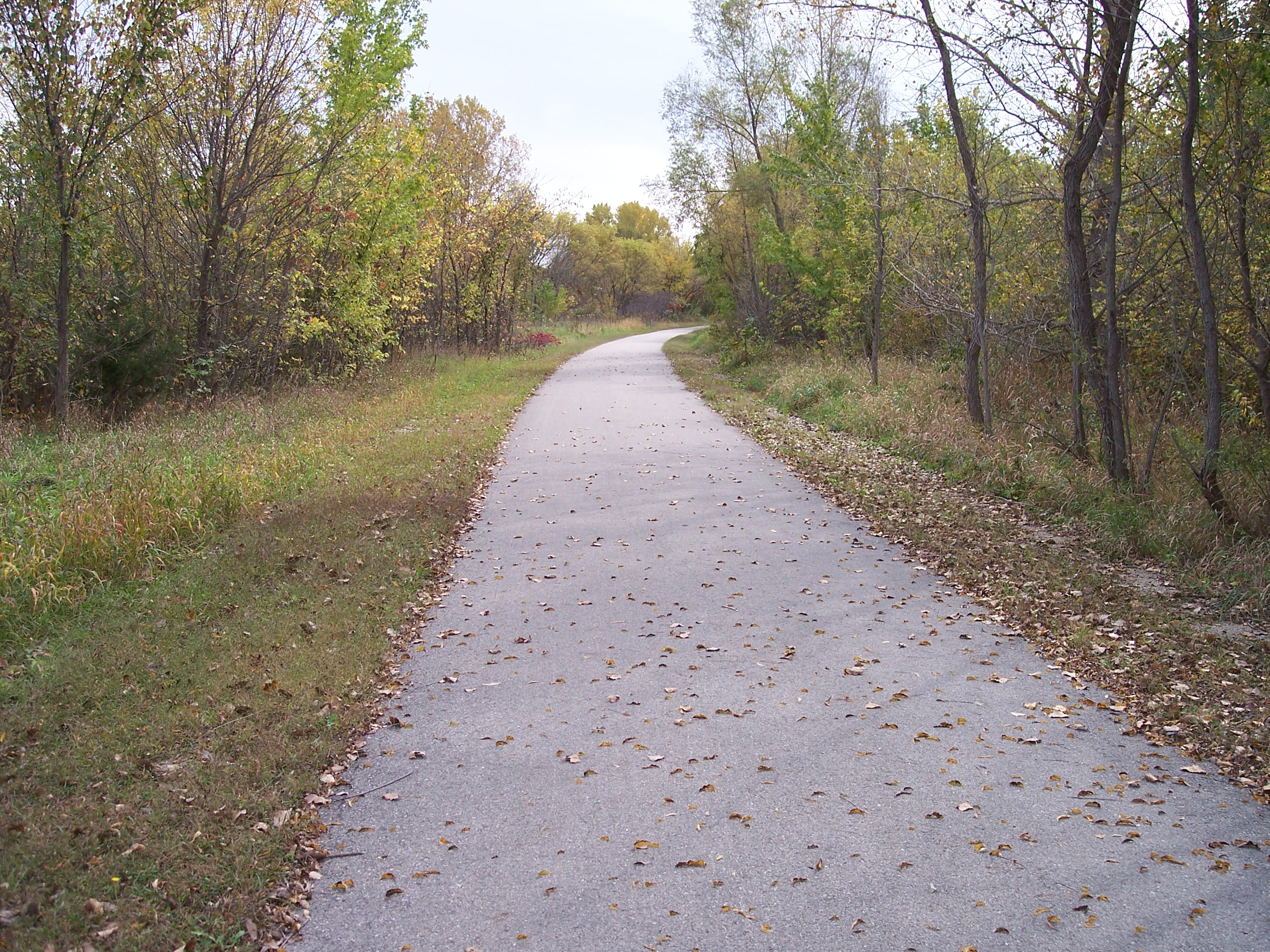
- The Great Western Trail south of Cumming
- Length: 16.5 mi (26.6 km)
- Location: Central Iowa, United States
- Established: 1992; 34 years ago
- Trailheads: Des Moines; Cumming; Martensdale
- Use: Hiking, biking
- Surface: Asphalt
- Right of way: Formerly the Chicago and North Western Railway.

The Great Western Trail is a rail trail in the Des Moines metropolitan area south-central Iowa, United States. There is also the Great Western Trail in Illinois, which utilizes the same right-of-way.

== Description ==
The trails is 16.5 miles (26.6 km) long and paved with asphalt. Starting in Water Works Park in Des Moines at its north end, it passes through suburban areas, Willow Creek Golf Course, fields, farmland, and the wooded valley of the North River, with a southern terminus in Martensdale.

The trail follows the route of an abandoned line of the Chicago, St. Paul and Kansas City Railroad, constructed in 1899. It is named after the Chicago Great Western Railway, which last operated trains over the segment in 1968. The trail is maintained by the Conservation Boards of Polk and Warren Counties.

== See also ==
- List of rail trails
