= Cumming, Iowa =

- City
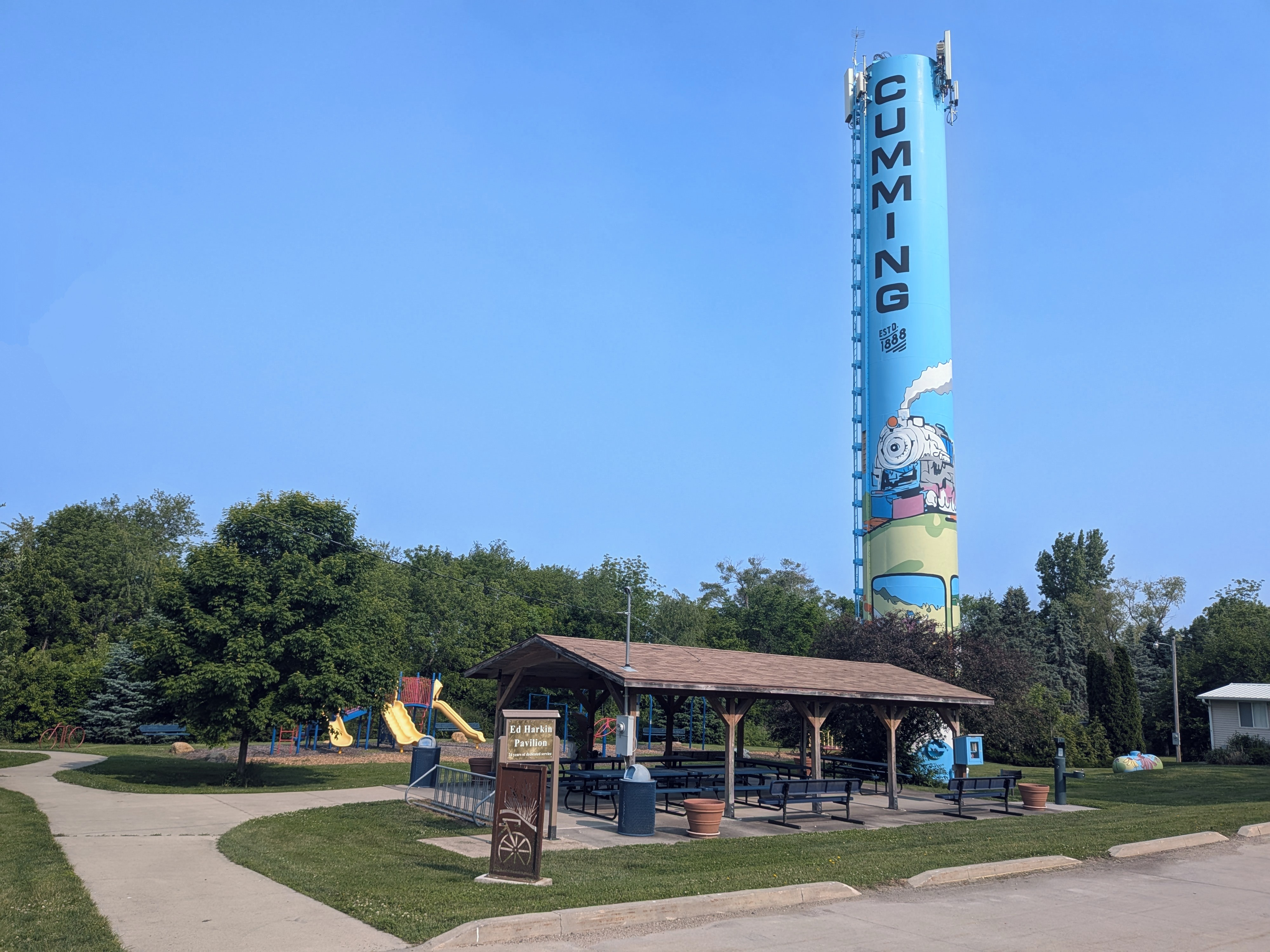
- Cumming city park

- Location of Cumming, Iowa
- Coordinates: 41°29′35″N 93°44′34″W
- Country: USA
- State: Iowa
- County: Warren

Area
  - Total: 2.54 sq mi (6.59 km^{2})
  - Land: 2.53 sq mi (6.56 km^{2})
  - Water: 0.012 sq mi (0.03 km^{2})
- Elevation: 981 ft (299 m)

Population (2020)
  - Total: 436
  - Density: 172.0/sq mi (66.41/km^{2})
- Time zone: UTC-6 (Central (CST))
  - Summer (DST): UTC-5 (CDT)
- ZIP code: 50061
- Area code: 515
- FIPS code: 19-17850
- GNIS feature ID: 2393695
- Website: cumming.iowa.gov/wordpress/

Cumming is a city in Warren County, Iowa, United States. The population was 436 at the time of the 2020 census.

A part of the Des Moines–West Des Moines Metropolitan Statistical Area, Cumming is considered one of the smallest incorporated suburbs of the metro area. The smallest of all cities in the five-county metro area is Bevington, in Madison and Warren counties, which had a population of 58 in 2000.

== Geography ==
According to the United States Census Bureau, the city has a total area of 2.57 square miles (6.66 km^{2}), of which, 2.56 square miles (6.63 km^{2}) is land and 0.01 square miles (0.03 km^{2}) is water.

The Great Western Trail passes through the city.

== Demographics ==
Historical populations
| Year | Pop. | ±% |
|---|---|---|
| 1930 | 149 | — |
| 1940 | 139 | −6.7% |
| 1950 | 131 | −5.8% |
| 1960 | 148 | +13.0% |
| 1970 | 189 | +27.7% |
| 1980 | 151 | −20.1% |
| 1990 | 132 | −12.6% |
| 2000 | 162 | +22.7% |
| 2010 | 351 | +116.7% |
| 2020 | 436 | +24.2% |
| 2025(est.) | 560 | +28.4% |
Source:"U.S. Census website". United States Census Bureau. and Iowa Data Center; Source: U.S. Decennial Census

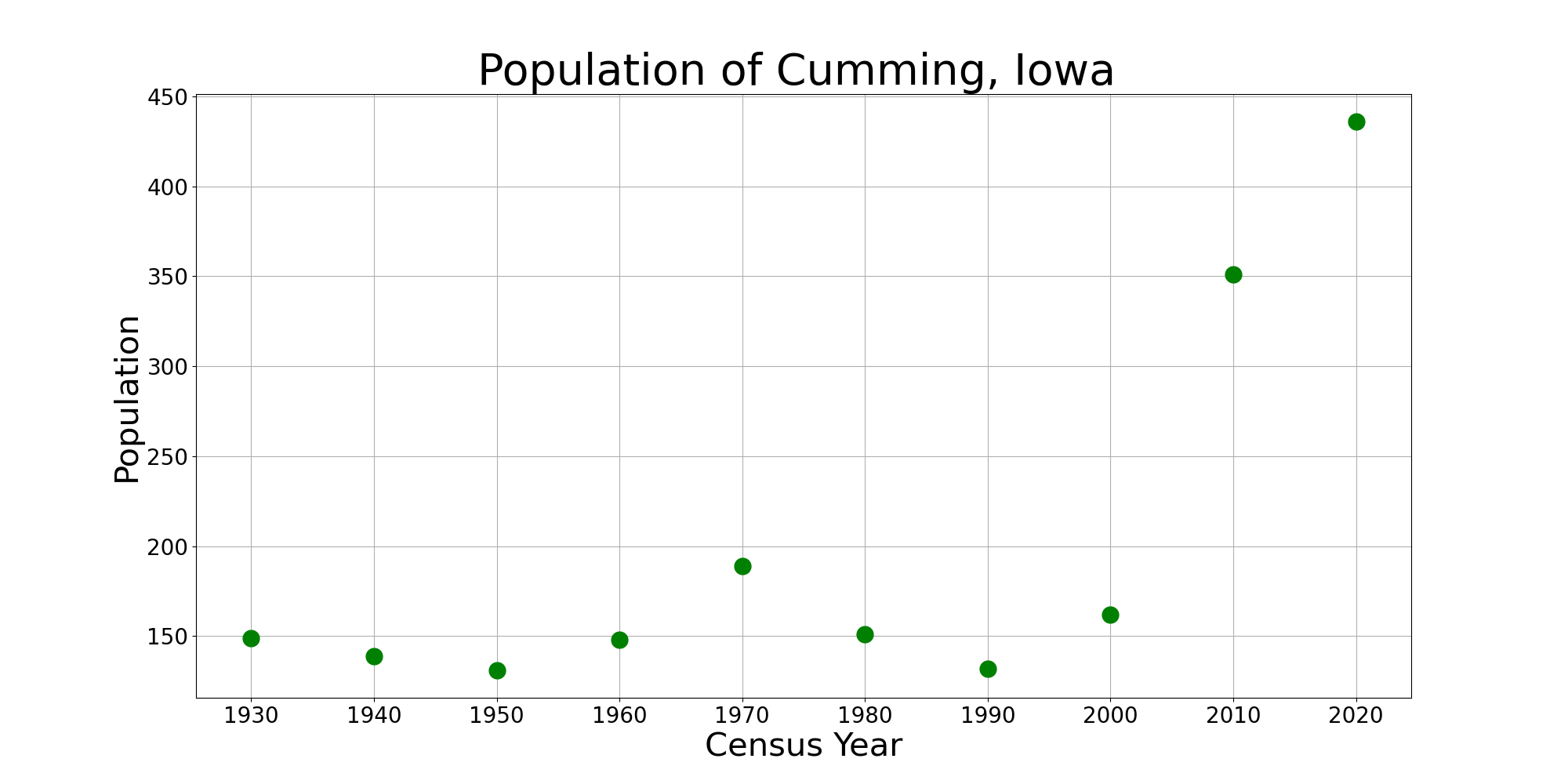
The population of Cumming, Iowa from US census data

=== 2020 census ===
As of the census of 2020, there were 436 people, 149 households, and 129 families residing in the city. The population density was 172.5 inhabitants per square mile (66.6/km^{2}). There were 158 housing units at an average density of 62.5 per square mile (24.1/km^{2}). The racial makeup of the city was 92.2% White, 0.0% Black or African American, 0.2% Native American, 0.7% Asian, 0.0% Pacific Islander, 0.5% from other races and 6.4% from two or more races. Hispanic or Latino persons of any race comprised 1.8% of the population.

Of the 149 households, 45.6% of which had children under the age of 18 living with them, 73.2% were married couples living together, 6.0% were cohabitating couples, 10.1% had a female householder with no spouse or partner present and 10.7% had a male householder with no spouse or partner present. 13.4% of all households were non-families. 8.1% of all households were made up of individuals, 6.0% had someone living alone who was 65 years old or older.

The median age in the city was 40.9 years. 31.7% of the residents were under the age of 20; 2.8% were between the ages of 20 and 24; 22.0% were from 25 and 44; 29.1% were from 45 and 64; and 14.4% were 65 years of age or older. The gender makeup of the city was 51.4% male and 48.6% female.

=== 2010 census ===
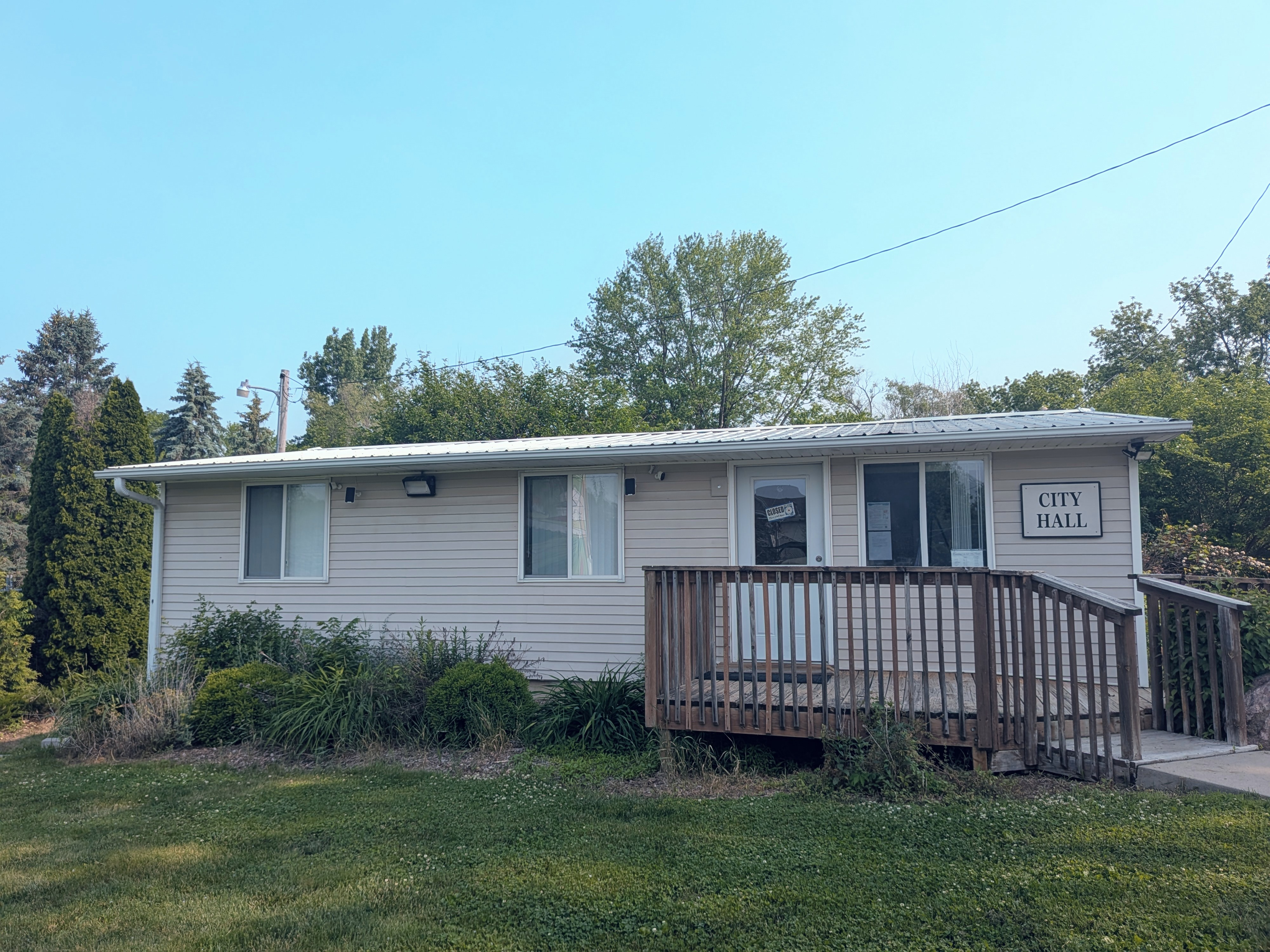
Cumming City Hall

As of the census of 2010, there were 351 people, 128 households, and 102 families living in the city. The population density was 137.1 inhabitants per square mile (52.9/km^{2}). There were 136 housing units at an average density of 53.1 per square mile (20.5/km^{2}). The racial makeup of the city was 96.9% White, 0.9% African American, 0.6% Asian, 0.6% from other races, and 1.1% from two or more races. Hispanic or Latino of any race were 1.1% of the population.

There were 128 households, of which 39.8% had children under the age of 18 living with them, 70.3% were married couples living together, 6.3% had a female householder with no husband present, 3.1% had a male householder with no wife present, and 20.3% were non-families. 14.1% of all households were made up of individuals, and 5.5% had someone living alone who was 65 years of age or older. The average household size was 2.74 and the average family size was 3.07.

The median age in the city was 40.1 years. 27.6% of residents were under the age of 18; 4.6% were between the ages of 18 and 24; 30.5% were from 25 to 44; 28% were from 45 to 64; and 9.4% were 65 years of age or older. The gender makeup of the city was 49.0% male and 51.0% female.

=== 2000 census ===
As of the census of 2000, there were 162 people, 65 households, and 52 families living in the city. The population density was 76.9 inhabitants per square mile (29.7/km^{2}). There were 69 housing units at an average density of 32.7 per square mile (12.6/km^{2}). The racial makeup of the city was 100.00% White.

There were 65 households, out of which 27.7% had children under the age of 18 living with them, 72.3% were married couples living together, 3.1% had a female householder with no husband present, and 18.5% were non-families. 13.8% of all households were made up of individuals, and 3.1% had someone living alone who was 65 years of age or older. The average household size was 2.48 and the average family size was 2.74.

In the city, the population was spread out, with 19.8% under the age of 18, 3.7% from 18 to 24, 30.9% from 25 to 44, 28.4% from 45 to 64, and 17.3% who were 65 years of age or older. The median age was 41 years. For every 100 females, there were 97.6 males. For every 100 females age 18 and over, there were 113.1 males.

The median income for a household in the city was $52,813, and the median income for a family was $56,071. Males had a median income of $40,893 versus $21,750 for females. The per capita income for the city was $23,575. None of the population or families were below the poverty line.

== Notable people ==
- Brent Allen, musical artist
- Tom Harkin, United States Senator (1985–2015) from Iowa

== See also ==
- Great Western Trail (Iowa)
- St. Patrick's Church (Cumming, Iowa), listed on the National Register of Historic Places
