= List of Danish Americans =

This is a list of notable Danish Americans, including both original immigrants who obtained American citizenship and their American-born descendants.

To be included in this list, the person must have a Wikipedia article showing they are Danish American or must have references showing they are Danish American and are notable.

== List ==
=== Actors ===
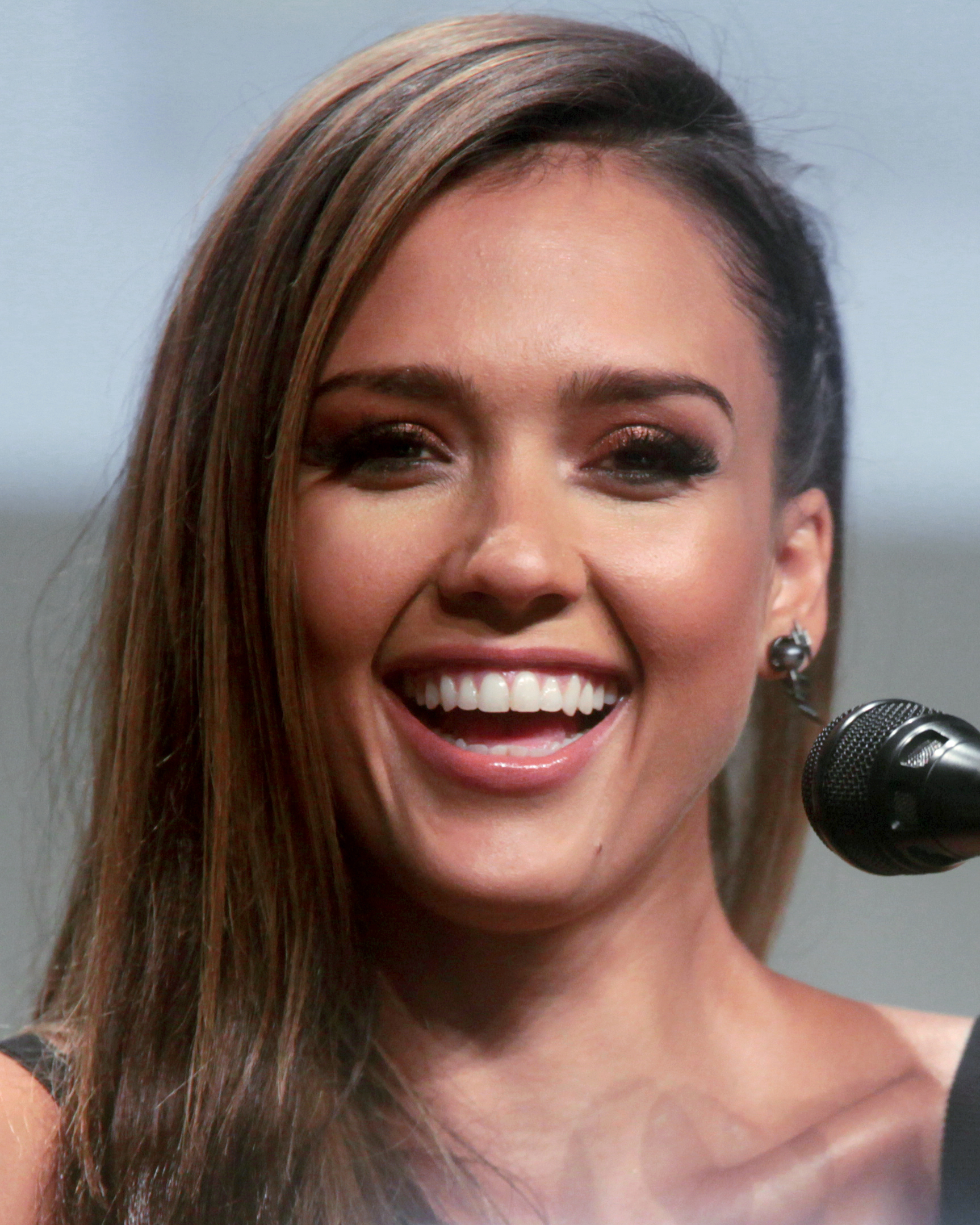
Jessica Alba

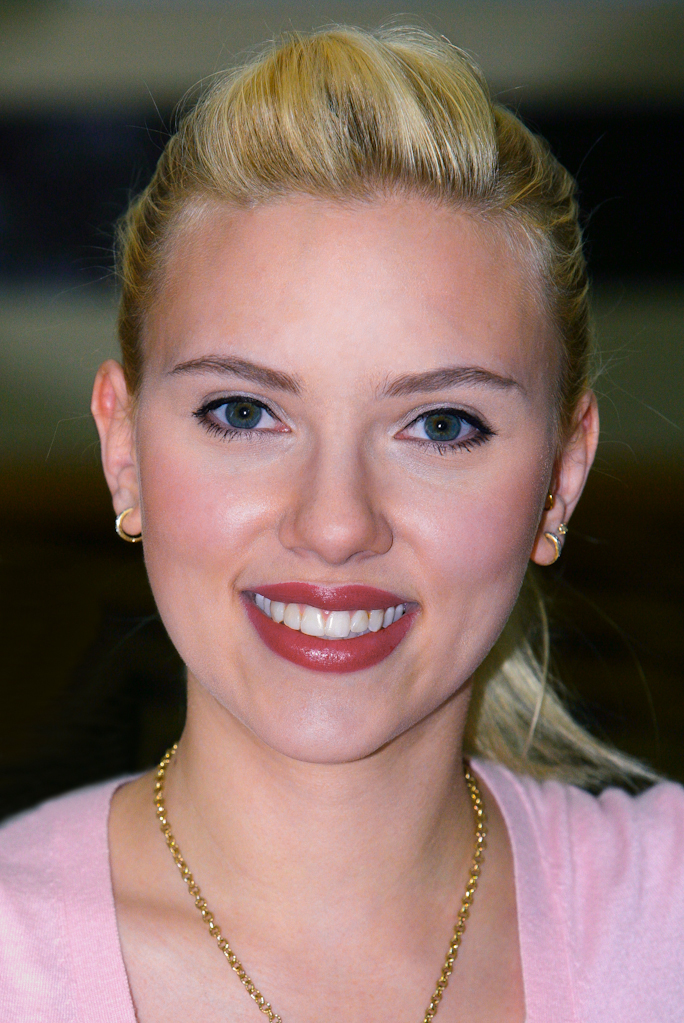
Scarlett Johansson

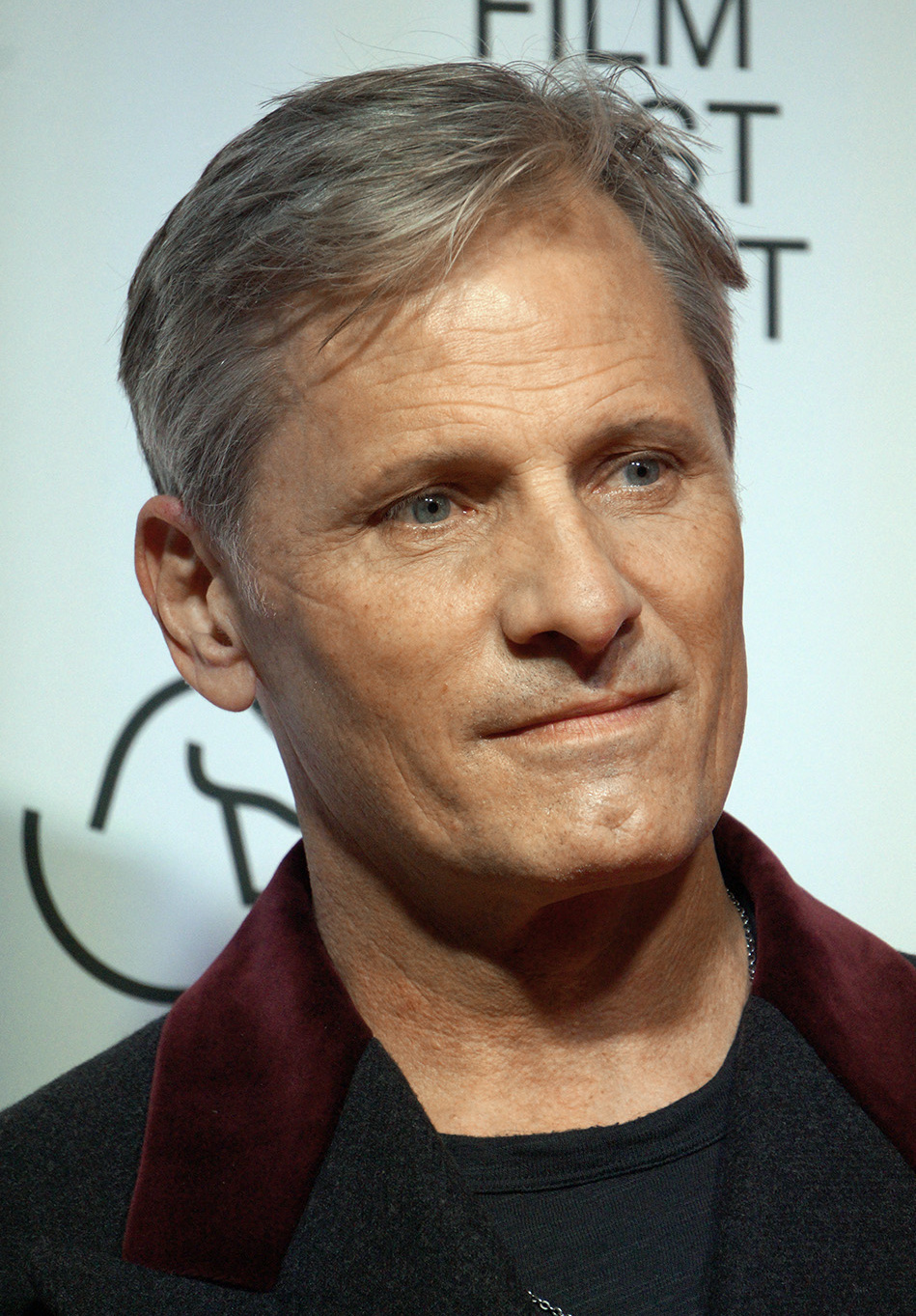
Viggo Mortensen

- Jessica Alba, actress, mother is of part Danish descent
- Amy Adams, actress with small amount of Danish ancestry.
- Bridgette Andersen, actress
- Robert Anderson, actor, make-up artist and director
- Gwili Andre, actress, immigrant from Denmark
- Earl W. Bascom, actor, maternal grandfather was from Denmark
- Rowan Blanchard, American actress
- Alexis Bledel, actress, paternal grandfather of Danish descent
- Michael Bowen, actor, son of actress Sonia Sorel (née Henius), who is the daughter of Danish-American biochemist Max Henius
- Richard Carlson, actor
- Keith Carradine, actor, Danish maternal great-grandfather Max Henius, Danish maternal great-grandmother the sister of historian Johan Ludvig Heiberg
- Robert Carradine, actor, brother of actor Keith Carradine
- Erika Christensen, actress, father is of part Danish descent
- Ellen Corby, actress, maiden name was Hansen
- Jamie Lee Curtis, actress, maternal grandmother was born to Danish immigrants
- Kelly Curtis, actress, sister of actress Jamie Lee Curtis
- Karl Dane, comedian and actor
- Eliza Dushku, actress, mother is of mostly Danish descent
- Buddy Ebsen, actor, father was of Danish ancestry
- Ann Forrest, actress, immigrant from Denmark
- Lilie Hayward, actress and screenwriter, sister of Danish American actress Seena Owen
- Florence Henderson, actress, daughter of Danish American mother
- Jean Hersholt, actor, immigrant from Denmark
- Maren Jensen, actress and model, father was of Danish ancestry
- Scarlett Johansson, actress, father is an immigrant from Denmark
- Ashley Johnson, actress and voice actress
- Tom Kenny, actor and voice actor
- Justin Kirk, actor, father of partial Danish descent
- Janet Leigh, actress, mother (Helen Westergaard), was born to Danish immigrants
- Deanna Lund, actress
- Michael Madsen, actor, father was of Danish ancestry
- Virginia Madsen, actress, father was of Danish ancestry
- John Melendez, entertainer
- Kristine Miller, actress
- Viggo Mortensen, actor, father is from Denmark
- Brigitte Nielsen, Danish-born actress
- Leslie Nielsen, Danish father
- Connie Nielsen, actress
- Nica Noelle, pornographic film actress/director (father)
- Mary-Kate and Ashley Olsen, fashion designers and former actresses (father is of partial Danish and partial Norwegian descent)
- Merlin Olsen, actor
- Susan Olsen, actress
- William Orlamond, actor, immigrant from Denmark
- Heather O'Rourke (1975–1988), child actress, mother is of Danish descent
- Seena Owen, actress, parents were immigrants from Denmark
- William Petersen, actor, paternal grandfather was of Danish ancestry
- Sarah Paulson, actress, her paternal great-grandfather was the son of Danish parents (the origin of her surname).
- Anders Randolf, actor, immigrant from Denmark
- AnnaSophia Robb, actress, one or two of her great-grandmothers were Danes
- Bodil Rosing (1877–1941), Danish-born actress who had roles in both silent and talkie Hollywood films
- Peter Sarsgaard, actor, paternal great-great-grandparents were born in Denmark
- Gale Sondergaard, actress
- Amandla Stenberg, actress, Danish father
- Sven-Ole Thorsen, actor and stuntman, immigrant from Denmark
- Uma Thurman, actress, mother is of partial Danish descent
- Vanessa Trump, actress and former model, mother of Danish origin
- Betty White, actress, Danish paternal grandfather
- Elijah Wood, American actor, maternal great-grandmother was of Danish ancestry
- Moon Zappa, actress, mother is of partial Danish ancestry

=== Architects ===
- Jens Jensen, landscape architect

=== Artists ===
- John Baldessari, conceptual artist, Danish mother
- Earl W. Bascom, painter and sculptor of the American and Canadian West, "Cowboy of Cowboy Artists", "Dean of Canadian Cowboy Artists"
- Gutzon Borglum, sculptor of Mount Rushmore
- Solon Borglum, sculptor of the American West
- C. C. A. Christensen, painter
- Floyd Gottfredson, cartoonist, creator of The Phantom Blob and Eega Beeva in the Mickey Mouse universe
- Christian Gullager, painter
- Antonio Jacobsen, maritime painter
- George Jensen, painter
- Eric Larson, animator
- Ib Penick, paper engineer
- Ferdinand Richardt, landscape painter
- Olaf Wieghorst, painter, "Dean of Western Art"

=== Athletics ===
- Chris "Birdman" Andersen, NBA player, father was a Danish immigrant
- Morten Andersen, NFL kicker
- Thomas William Asmussen, Major League Baseball catcher
- Earl W. Bascom, rodeo pioneer, rodeo champion, rodeo hall of fame inductee, "Father of Modern Rodeo"
- Julia Boserup, tennis player, Danish parents
- Jay DeMerit, professional soccer player
- Niko Hansen, professional soccer player
- Jim Jensen, football player
- Kristoffer Lund, soccer player, Danish father
- Vern Mikkelsen, basketball player
- Colonel Thomas Hoyer Monstery, fencing and boxing master
- Battling Nelson, professional boxing world lightweight champion 1905–1906, 1908–1910
- Josef Newgarden, IndyCar driver, Indianapolis 500 winner
- Greg Olsen, football player
- Merlin Olsen, football player for Los Angeles Rams, Pro Football Hall of Fame inductee, older brother to Orrin and Phil
- Orrin Olsen, football player for Kansas City Chiefs
- Phil Olsen, football player for L.A. Rams, Denver Broncos and the Buffalo Bills
- Anton Peterlin, soccer player
- Henrik Rummel, Danish-born olympic rower
- Reed Sorenson, NASCAR driver
- Noah Syndergaard, current MLB pitcher for the New York Mets
- Alan Voskuil, basketball player for the Danish national team
- Kid Williams, professional boxing world bantamweight champion 1914–1917

=== Journalism ===
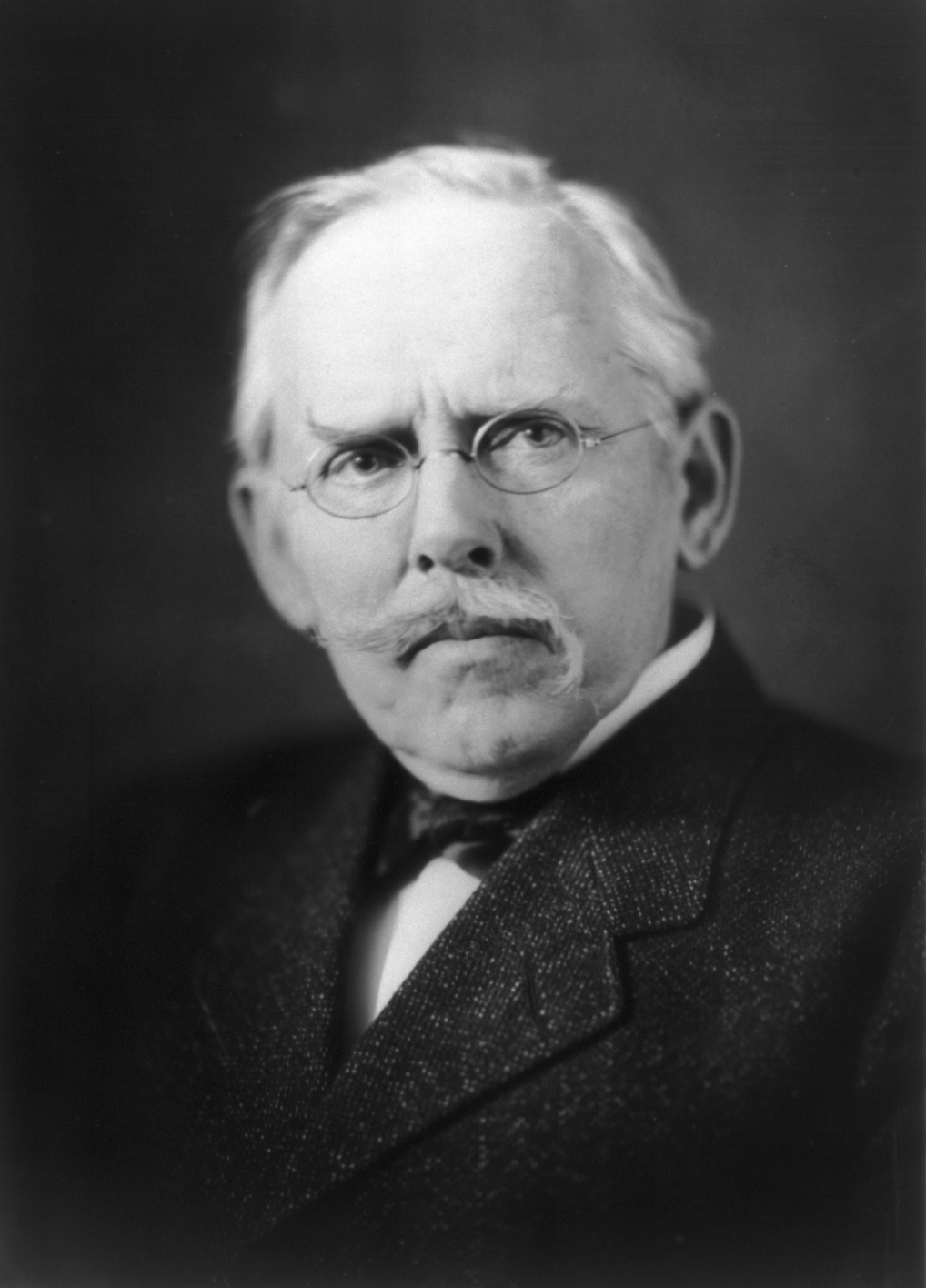
Jacob Riis

- Jack Anderson, journalist
- Chris Hansen, television journalist
- Sophus Frederik Neble, Danish born editor of Den Danske Pioneer
- Jacob Riis, Danish born journalist

=== Music ===
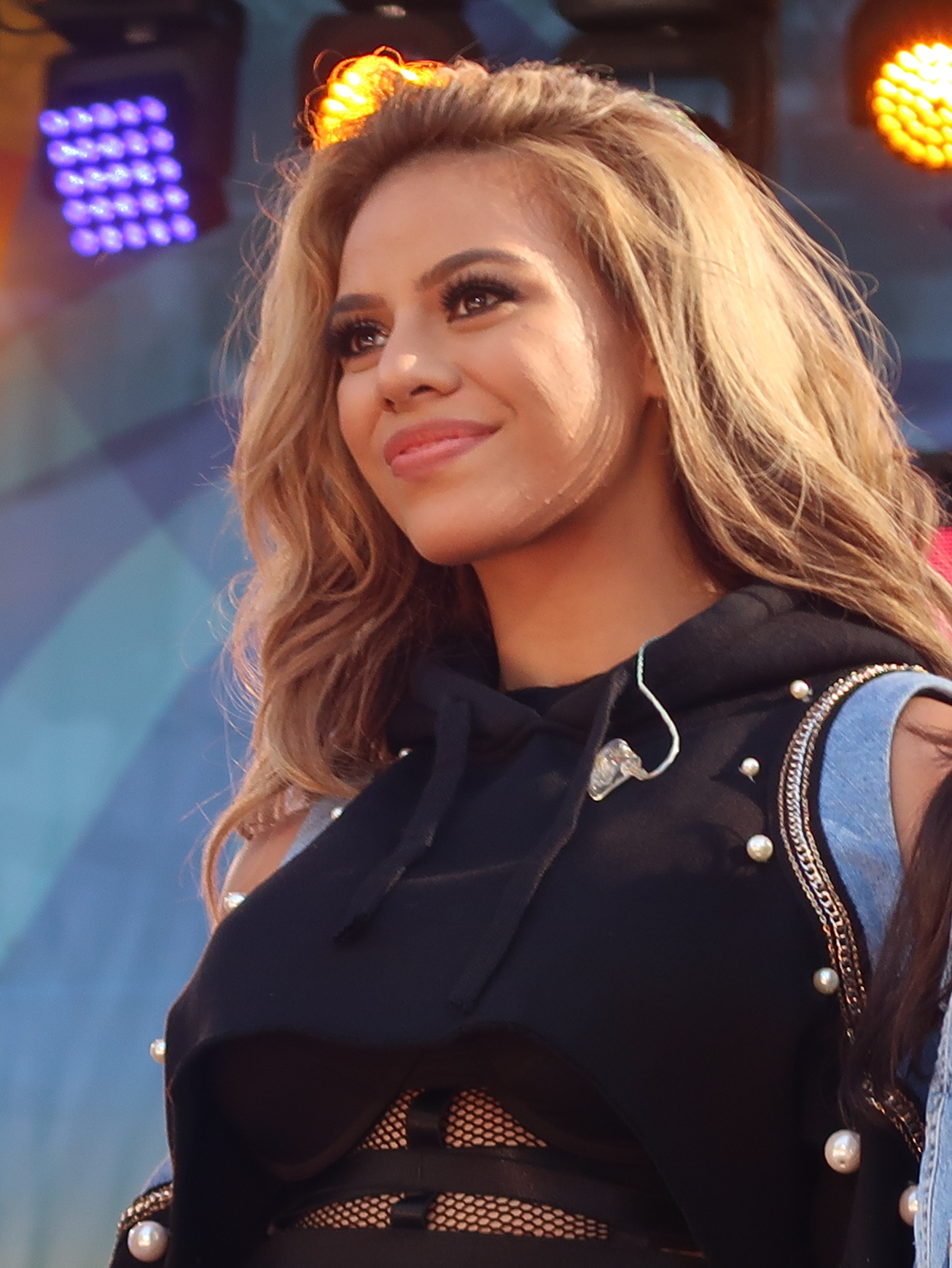
Dinah Jane

- Phil Anselmo, musician
- Peter Blegvad, musician
- Peter Breinholt, musician
- Victor Borge, musician and comedian
- Julian Casablancas, The Strokes vocalist
- Mose Christensen, symphony conductor
- Alf Clausen, film and television composer
- King Diamond, King Diamond lead vocalist
- Lars Frederiksen, Rancid vocalist and guitarist
- Dinah Jane, member of Fifth Harmony
- Taylor Hanson, musician
- Zac Hanson, musician
- Otto Harbach, lyricist
- Gunnar Johansen, pianist and composer
- Morten Lauridsen, composer
- Anita Lerche, singer-songwriter and composer
- Sara Lund, drummer of Unwound
- Kesang Marstrand, musician, Danish mother
- Lauritz Melchior, opera singer
- M. P. Møller, pipe organ builder
- Rick Nielsen, Cheap Trick guitarist
- Iggy Pop, singer-songwriter
- Matthew Santos, rock and folk singer-songwriter, musician and painter, mother Danish-born
- Tinashe, singer
- Mads Tolling, violist and composer
- Mike Tramp, singer-songwriter
- Lars Ulrich, Metallica drummer
- Eddie Vedder, Pearl Jam singer-songwriter
- Zolita, singer-songwriter, mother of Danish descent
- Kai Ewans, Danish born american musician,maternal grandfather of Vanessa Trump and great grandfather of Kai Trump

=== Politics and law ===
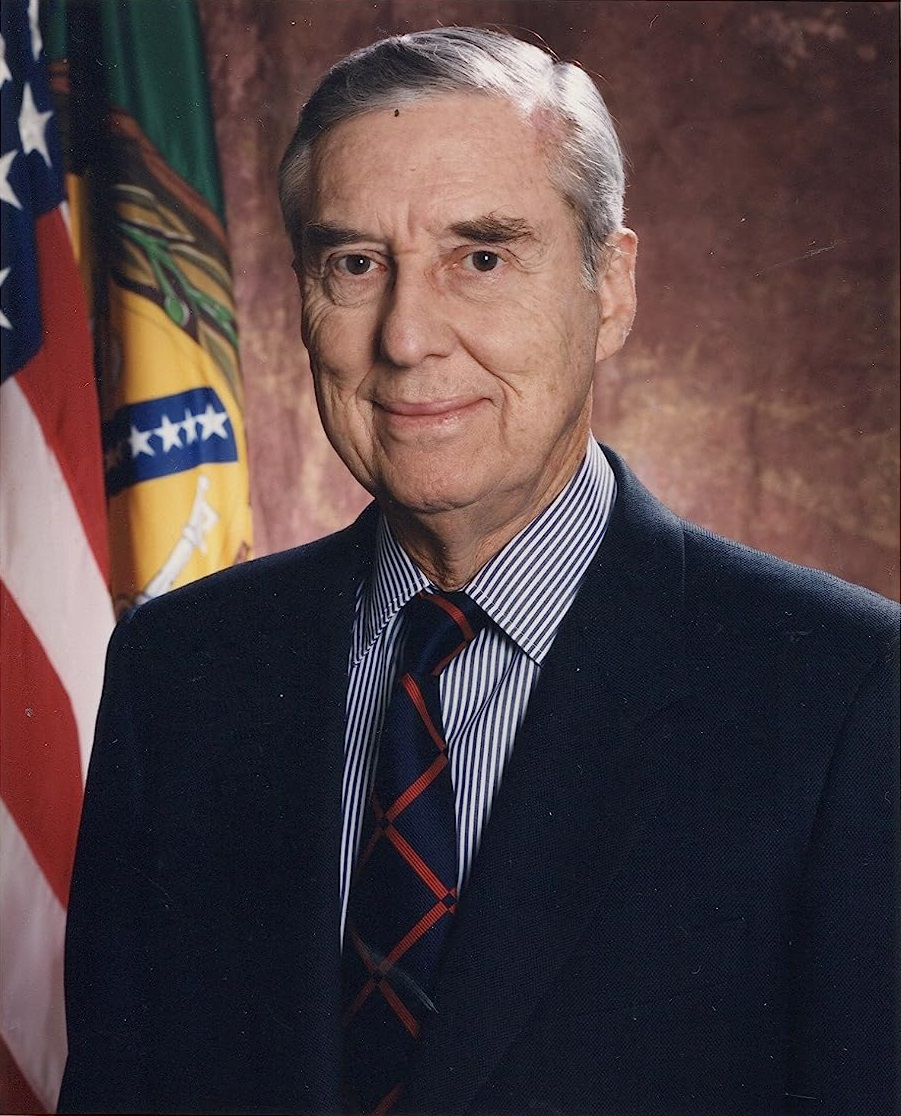
Lloyd Bentsen

- Theodore F. Bagge, former Democratic member of the California State Assembly from 1875–1877
- Lloyd Bentsen, former Democratic senator from Texas, Treasury Secretary, and vice presidential nominee
- Charles Binderup, former Democratic Congressman from Nebraska from 1935–1939
- Jeffrey Breinholt, Deputy Chief of Counterterrorism at the U.S. Department of Justice
- Marius Dueholm, Danish born American farmer and politician
- Hans Peter Mareus Neilsen Gammel, author of The Laws of Texas 1822–1897
- Newt Gingrich, former Republican Congressman from Georgia from 1979 to 1999, and Speaker of the House from 1995 to 1999.
- Leo Hoegh, Decorated U.S. Army officer, lawyer, and politician who served as the 33rd Governor of Iowa from 1955 to 1957
- Steny Hoyer, House Minority Whip and former House Majority Leader
- Jacob Johnson, former Republican Congressman from Utah from 1913–1915
- Roger Jepsen, former Republican senator from Iowa
- Jo Jorgensen, Libertarian vice presidential candidate of 1996, and presidential candidate of 2020.
- Niels Juul, former Republican Congressman from Illinois from 1917–1921
- Chris Madsen, United States Marshals Service
- Janet Reno, Attorney General
- Ted Sorensen, speechwriter and president advisor
- Henry Suverkrup, former independent member of the California State Assembly from 1875–1877
- Charles W. Woodman, former Republican Congressman from Illinois from 1895–1897

=== Religious personalities ===
- Anton Marius Andersen, founding President of Trinity Seminary at Dana College
- Kristian Anker, first president of the combined Trinity Seminary and Dana College
- Gottlieb Bender Christiansen, founding President of the United Evangelical Lutheran Church
- Claus Lauritz Clausen, first President of the Conference of the Norwegian-Danish Evangelical Lutheran Church of America
- Theodore Marcus Hansen, President of Dana College and Trinity Seminary
- Kristian Ostergaard, Lutheran pastor, educator and author
- Peter Sørensen Vig, President and Professor of Theology at Trinity Seminary at Dana College
- Russell M. Nelson, heart surgeon; President of the Church of Jesus Christ of Latter-day Saints
- D. Todd Christofferson, member of the Quorum of the Twelve Apostles, the Church of Jesus Christ of Latter-day Saints
- Neil L. Andersen, member of the Quorum of the Twelve Apostles, the Church of Jesus Christ of Latter-day Saints
- Ronald A. Rasband, member of the Quorum of the Twelve Apostles, the Church of Jesus Christ of Latter-day Saints

=== Science ===
- Jens Clausen, evolutionary biologist
- Erik Erikson, psychologist
- Philo Farnsworth, inventor and television pioneer
- Niels Ebbesen Hansen, Head of the Horticultural Department at South Dakota State University
- William Webster Hansen, physicist and one of the founders of microwave electronics technology
- Max Henius, biochemist and founder of the Rebild National Park in Denmark
- Theo Holm, botanist
- Christine Korsgaard, philosopher
- Otto Larsen, sociologist known for academic work in mass hysteria and public positions on obscenity and pornography
- Dale T. Mortensen, economist
- Peter Norvig, computer scientist
- Jørgen Slots, American professor and researcher, immigrant from Denmark
- Holger Thiele, astronomer

=== Writers ===
- Poul Anderson, science fiction author
- Erik Christian Haugaard, author of children's books
- Axel Madsen, writer
- Ib Melchior, Danish born film director, science fiction author and screenwriter
- Joel Skousen, American author
- Mark Skousen, American economist and author
- Royal Skousen, American professor
- W. Cleon Skousen, American author
- Brad Torgersen, science fiction author
- Sophus Keith Winther, professor and novelist

=== Other ===
- Jeff Bezos, founder of Amazon, biological father Ted Jorgensen, son of Danish immigrants
- Alma de Bretteville Spreckels, philanthropist
- Helle Crafts (1947-1986), murder victim
- John Wayne Gacy (1942–1994), serial killer
- Robert Hansen (1939–2014), serial killer known as the "Butcher Baker".
- Peter L. Jensen, engineer, inventor and entrepreneur and co-creator of the first moving-coil loudspeaker
- Johnson Outboards was founded by the Johnson brothers. Their father, Soren, was born in Denmark.
- Semon Knudsen, executive with Ford Motor Company and General Motors
- William S. Knudsen, Lieutenant general and executive with Ford Motor Company and General Motors
- Christian Mortensen, Danish-born supercentenarian, was longest-lived man on record at the time of his death
- Arthur Nielsen, American market analyst of Danish descent who founded the ACNielsen company and Nielsen Media Research, best known for the Nielsen ratings
- George Nissen, inventor of the trampoline, was the son of Danish immigrants
- Charles E. Sorensen, production engineer and executive with Ford Motor Company
- Claus von Bülow, Danish-born socialite accused of killing his wife Sunny
