= Breinholt =

Breinholt is a surname. Notable people with the surname include:

- Floyd E. Breinholt (1915–1997), American educator and painter
- Jeffrey Breinholt (born 1963), American lawyer
- McKenna Faith Breinholt (fl. 2020s), American Idol contestant
- Peter Breinholt (born 1969), American musician
