= Danish America =

Danish America may refer to:

- Danish Americans, Americans with origins in Denmark
- Greenland, North American autonomous territory of the Kingdom of Denmark
- Danish colonies in the Americas

== See also ==
- Danish American relations
- Danish diaspora
- Museum of Danish America in Iowa, United States
