= Jens Otto Christiansen House =

Historic house in Iowa, United States

- U.S. National Register of Historic Places
- Location within Iowa Location within the United States
- Location: 2105 College Ave. Elk Horn, Iowa
- Coordinates: 41°35′37.33″N 95°03′38.99″W
- Area: less than one acre
- Built: 1908
- Built by: Jens Otto Christiansen
- Architectural style: Queen Anne
- MPS: Ethnic Historic Settlement of Shelby and Audubon Counties MPS
- NRHP reference No.: 96001584
- Added to NRHP: January 16, 1997

The Jens Otto Christiansen House, also known as Bedstemor's (Grandmother's) House, is a historic residence located in Elk Horn, Iowa, United States. It was listed on the National Register of Historic Places in 1997. The historic importance of the house is its association with Danish immigration into Shelby and Audubon counties from 1865 to 1924. This is the largest area of Danish rural settlement in the United States. Construction of the 1½-story, frame house is attributed to Jens Otto Christiansen, who immigrated to the United States in 1889 and worked as a carpenter. It follows a basic foursquare plan with Queen Anne-style embellishments that include triangular gabled wall dormers, decorative sunburst woodwork, and decorative shingle siding.

The Museum of Danish America offers tours of Bedstemor's House by appointment, or during the annual Tivoli Festival where it is open all day.
