= Elk Horn, Iowa =

- City
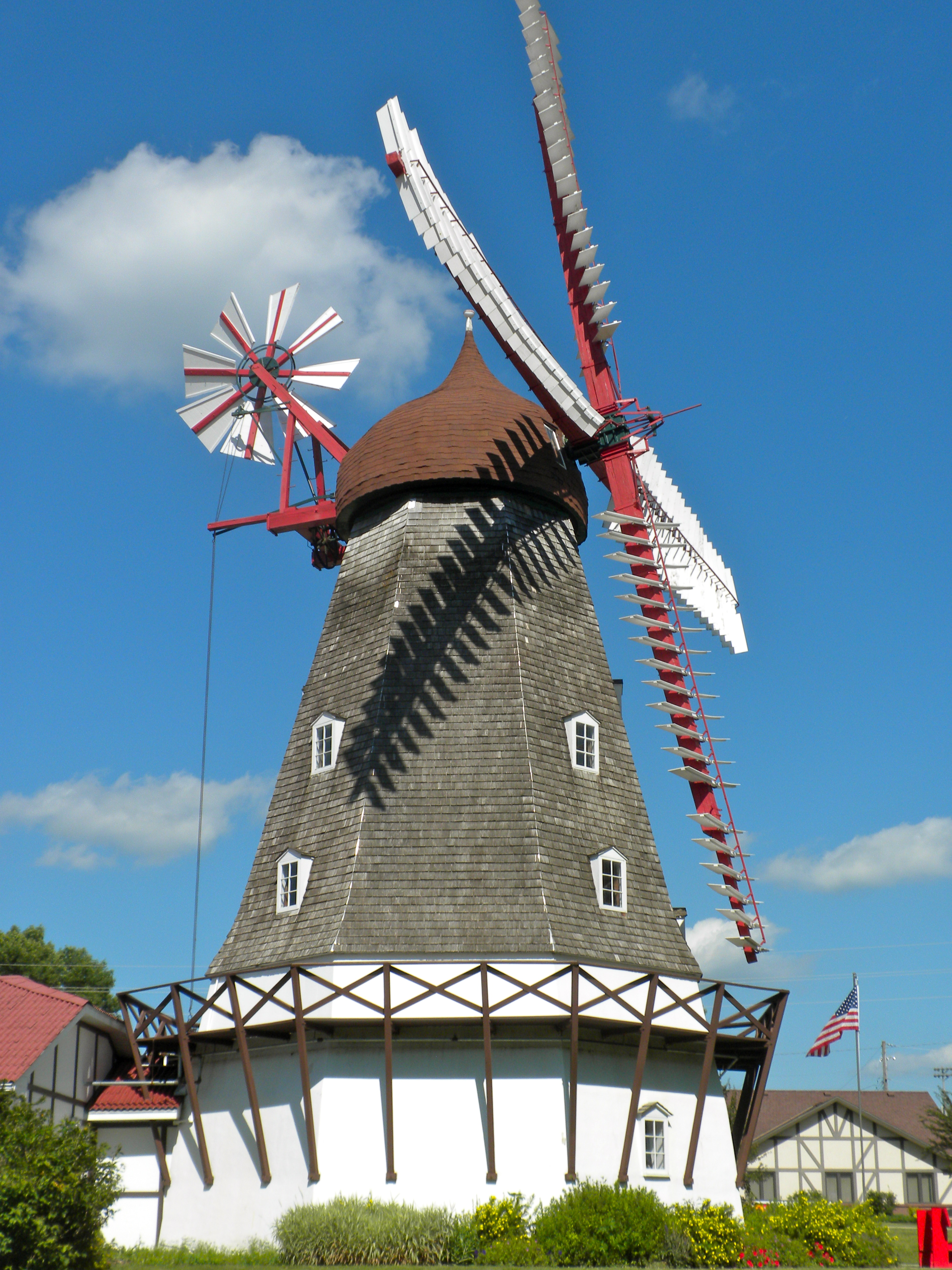
- The windmill, originally located in the Danish town of Nørre Snede

- Location of Elk Horn, Iowa
- Coordinates: 41°35′35″N 95°03′41″W
- Country: United States
- State: Iowa
- County: Shelby

Area
  - Total: 0.73 sq mi (1.89 km^{2})
  - Land: 0.73 sq mi (1.89 km^{2})
  - Water: 0 sq mi (0.00 km^{2})
- Elevation: 1,362 ft (415 m)

Population (2020)
  - Total: 601
  - Density: 822/sq mi (317.5/km^{2})
- Time zone: UTC-6 (Central (CST))
  - Summer (DST): UTC-5 (CDT)
- ZIP code: 51531
- Area code: 712
- FIPS code: 19-24780
- GNIS feature ID: 2394649
- Website: www.elkhorniowa.com

Elk Horn is a city in Shelby County, Iowa, United States. The population was 601 at the time of the 2020 census. Elk Horn is known as an enclave of Danish ethnicity and is home to the Museum of Danish America.

== History ==
Elk Horn was platted in 1901, and incorporated as a town in 1910. The city took its name from Elk Horn Creek. Newspaper articles from the Atlantic, Iowa newspaper published in 1919 on the death of Mrs. Winters and 1939 on the history of Clay Township In 1864 a colony of Wisconsin people with 3 or 4 covered wagons came to Iowa to establish a town and settled on a knoll two miles southwest of what is now Elk Horn. With the establishment of the post office, Mrs. Caroline Whitney Winters, wife of Theron W. Winters suggested the name of Elk Horn as so many elk shed their horns in the timber there. Mrs. Winters was the first post mistress as the post office was kept in the Winters cabin for a number of years. Her husband traversed the stage route along the ridge country between Grove City and Harlan, carrying the mail prior to the advent of the railroad. The site of the cabin was later occupied by Chris and Stena Jensen, and the Lawrence Nelson and Mrs. Peter M Petersen farms.

== Geography ==
According to the United States Census Bureau, the city has a total area of 0.77 square miles (1.99 km^{2}), all of it land.

== Demographics ==
Historical populations
Year	Pop.	±%
1920	589	—
1930	513	−12.9%
1940	486	−5.3%
1950	566	+16.5%
1960	679	+20.0%
1970	667	−1.8%
1980	746	+11.8%
1990	672	−9.9%
2000	649	−3.4%
2010	662	+2.0%
2020	601	−9.2%
Source:"U.S. Census website". United States Census Bureau. and Iowa Data Center; Source: U.S. Decennial Census

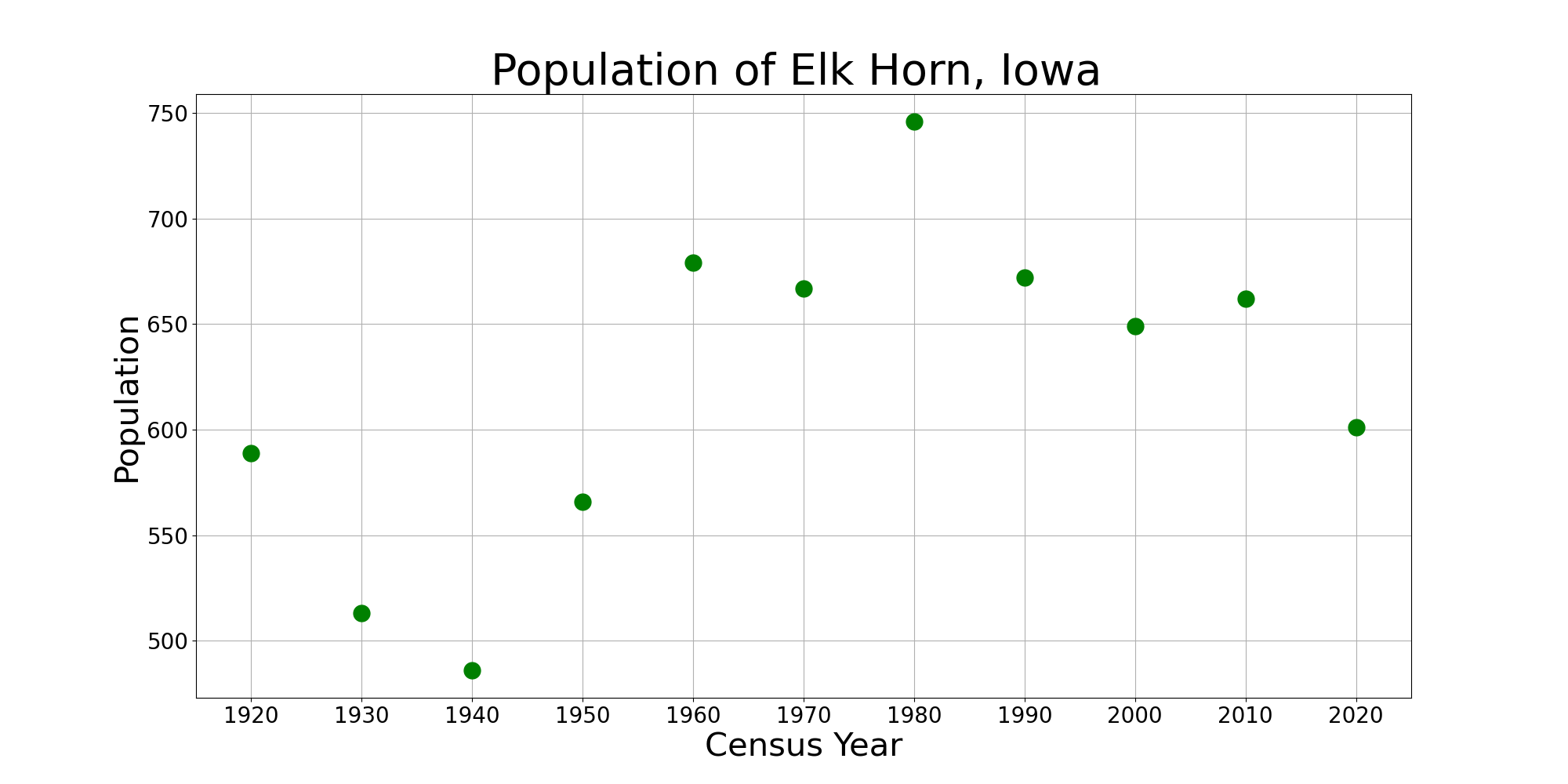
The population of Elk Horn, Iowa from US census data

=== 2020 census ===
As of the census of 2020, there were 601 people, 247 households, and 157 families residing in the city. The population density was 822.3 inhabitants per square mile (317.5/km^{2}). There were 273 housing units at an average density of 373.5 per square mile (144.2/km^{2}). The racial makeup of the city was 97.3% White, 0.0% Black or African American, 0.0% Native American, 0.0% Asian, 0.0% Pacific Islander, 0.2% from other races and 2.5% from two or more races. Hispanic or Latino persons of any race comprised 2.0% of the population.

Of the 247 households, 27.1% of which had children under the age of 18 living with them, 55.1% were married couples living together, 7.7% were cohabitating couples, 23.5% had a female householder with no spouse or partner present and 13.8% had a male householder with no spouse or partner present. 36.4% of all households were non-families. 31.6% of all households were made up of individuals, 19.8% had someone living alone who was 65 years old or older.

The median age in the city was 51.9 years. 20.3% of the residents were under the age of 20; 4.3% were between the ages of 20 and 24; 18.6% were from 25 and 44; 23.0% were from 45 and 64; and 33.8% were 65 years of age or older. The gender makeup of the city was 48.1% male and 51.9% female.

=== 2010 census ===
As of the census of 2010, there were 662 people, 255 households, and 163 families residing in the city. The population density was 859.7 inhabitants per square mile (331.9/km^{2}). There were 274 housing units at an average density of 355.8 per square mile (137.4/km^{2}). The racial makeup of the city was 98.9% White, 0.8% from other races, and 0.3% from two or more races. Hispanic or Latino of any race were 1.7% of the population.

There were 255 households, of which 27.8% had children under the age of 18 living with them, 55.3% were married couples living together, 7.1% had a female householder with no husband present, 1.6% had a male householder with no wife present, and 36.1% were non-families. 32.5% of all households were made up of individuals, and 20.8% had someone living alone who was 65 years of age or older. The average household size was 2.31 and the average family size was 2.91.

The median age in the city was 50 years. 20.5% of residents were under the age of 18; 5.3% were between the ages of 18 and 24; 16.6% were from 25 to 44; 23.6% were from 45 to 64; and 33.8% were 65 years of age or older. The gender makeup of the city was 47.6% male and 52.4% female.

=== 2000 census ===
As of the census of 2000, there were 649 people, 248 households, and 171 families residing in the city. The population density was 844.6 inhabitants per square mile (326.1/km^{2}). There were 261 housing units at an average density of 339.7 per square mile (131.2/km^{2}). The racial makeup of the city was 99.08% White, 0.15% Native American, 0.62% Asian, and 0.15% from two or more races. Hispanic or Latino of any race were 0.31% of the population.

There were 248 households, out of which 26.2% had children under the age of 18 living with them, 59.7% were married couples living together, 8.1% had a female householder with no husband present, and 31.0% were non-families. 29.8% of all households were made up of individuals, and 19.8% had someone living alone who was 65 years of age or older. The average household size was 2.23 and the average family size was 2.73.

Age spread: 20.2% under the age of 18, 2.6% from 18 to 24, 17.3% from 25 to 44, 17.6% from 45 to 64, and 42.4% who were 65 years of age or older. The median age was 56 years. For every 100 females, there were 79.3 males. For every 100 females age 18 and over, there were 74.4 males.

The median income for a household in the city was $33,333, and the median income for a family was $38,281. Males had a median income of $31,667 versus $21,146 for females. The per capita income for the city was $15,412. About 1.2% of families and 2.7% of the population were below the poverty line, including 1.5% of those under age 18 and 4.4% of those age 65 or over.

== Education ==
Students from the area attend Exira–Elk Horn–Kimballton Community School District, which has a campus located in Elk Horn. The former Elk Horn–Kimballton Community School District consolidated effective July 1, 2014.

The school mascots used to be the "Danes" and "Lady Danes," which represents Elk Horn's Danish ancestry and tradition.

As of 2010, all sports were combined with the Exira "Vikings" and "Vikettes" from Exira, Iowa to create the Exira-EH-K Spartans; mascot colors now are maroon and black for both schools, the original colors for EH-K were orange and black. And starting in the new school year of 2011, the schools combined completely. As of 2024, the high school and junior high are in Elk Horn, and the elementary being in Exira.

Elk Horn was also the site of the Elk Horn Højskole. This school, founded in 1878 by Danish immigrant Kristian Ostergaard, was the first Danish folk school in America. It served as a magnet for Danish immigrants, drawing them to Elk Horn in great numbers. In 1894, Pastor Kristian Anker, then owner and principal of the Elk Horn Højskole, sold it to the newly formed Danish Lutheran Church in North America for use as a seminary and college. In 1896, the seminary was relocated and consolidated with Trinity Seminary at Dana College in Blair, Nebraska.

== Culture ==
Danish cuisine is made in Elk Horn, and the community has businesses selling Danish bakery goods.
