= Floyd E. Breinholt =

American educator and painter

- Born: December 25, 1915; Ephraim, Utah, U.S.
- Died: January 29, 1997 (aged 81); Provo, Utah, U.S.
- Resting place: East Lawn Memorial Hills Cemetery
- Education: Snow College; Brigham Young University
- Occupations: Professor, painter
- Spouses: Tess E. Tidwell; Claudia Young Duerden

Floyd E. Breinholt (December 25, 1915 – January 29, 1997) was an American educator and painter. He was an art professor at Brigham Young University for two decades.

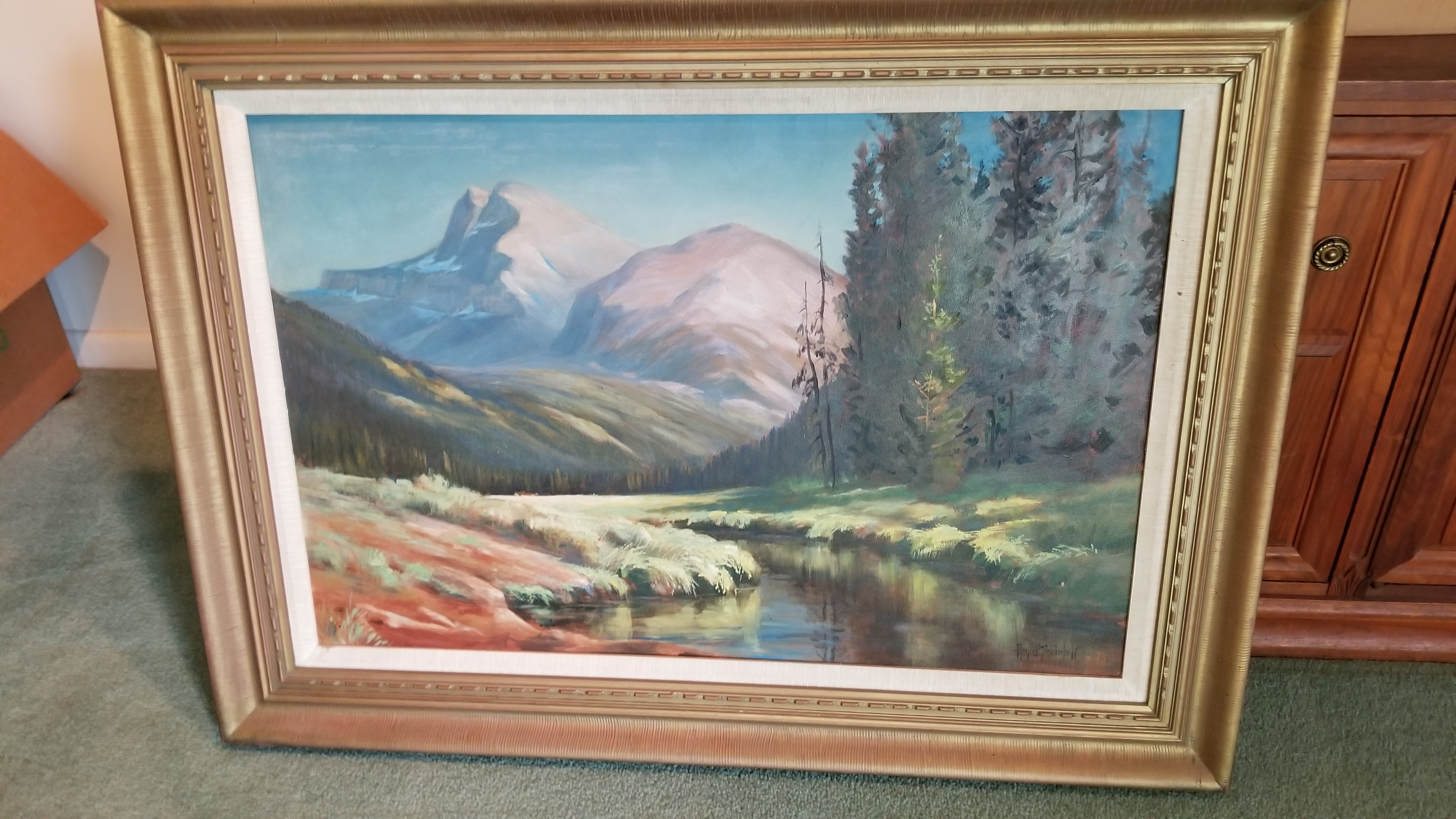
Painting by Floyd E. Breinholt

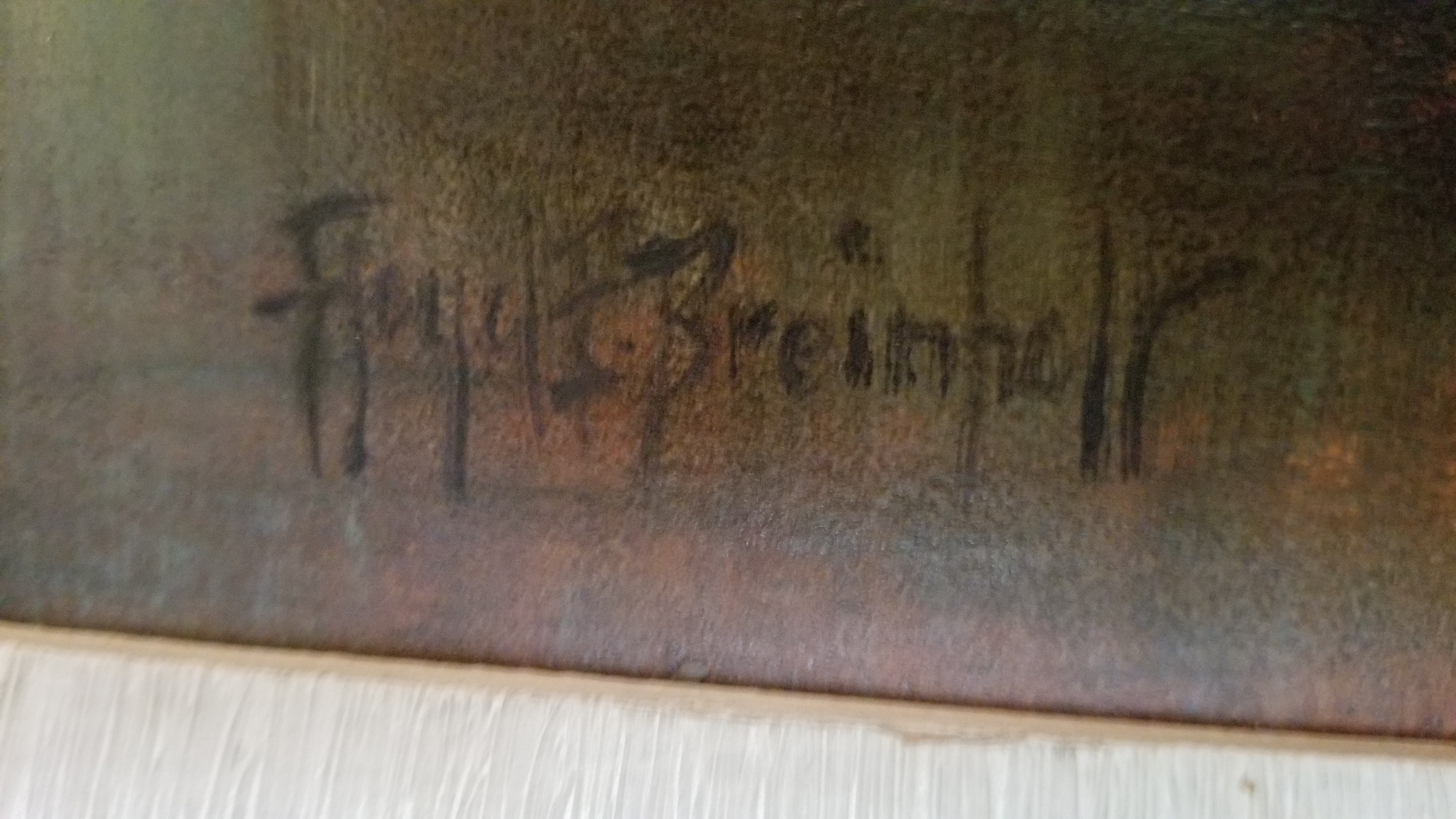
Painting Signature of Floyd E. Breinholt

== Life ==
Breinholt was born on December 25, 1915, in Ephraim, Utah. He graduated from Snow College in 1935, followed by Brigham Young University, where he earned a bachelor's degree in 1937 and a master in education in 1953.

Breinholt began his career as a schoolteacher and principal in Provo, Utah. He taught in the Department of Art at Brigham Young University from 1961 to 1981. He was also a regionalist painter. He had a studio in Provo and another one near St. George, Utah. Some of his artwork was acquired by the Springville Museum of Art.

Breinholt was a member of the Church of Jesus Christ of Latter-day Saints. He married Tess E. Tidwell in the Manti Utah Temple in 1939, and after he was widowed he married Claudia Young Duerden in the Provo Utah Temple in 1976. He also served as a bishop. He died of cancer on January 29, 1997, in Provo, and he was buried in the East Lawn Memorial Hills Cemetery.
