= Kristian Ostergaard =

Danish-American Lutheran pastor, educator, author and hymnwriter

Kristian Østergaard or Kristian Ostergaard (February 5, 1855 – October 9, 1931) was a Danish-American Lutheran pastor, educator, author and hymnwriter.

== Biography ==
Kristian Østergaard was born on 5 February 1855 in Volstrup near Hjerm, Denmark, to farmer Peder Davidsen (Østergaard) and Maren Pedersdatter. Ostergaard immigrated to the United States in 1878 and taught at the Danish Folk High School in Elk Horn, Iowa. He went back to Denmark, where he founded a folk high school in Støvring, before returning again to the United States in 1892. He became a Lutheran pastor and was affiliated with multiple congregations.

Following his retirement from the ministry, Ostergaard wrote fiction about Danish immigrants in the United States. He also published songbooks: Børnesangbogen (1898) and Den dansk-amerikanske Højskolesangbog (1901). A poetry collection was published in 1912 as Sange fra Prærien. Ostergaard wrote the hymn Den Sag er aldrig i Verden tabt, which was translated into English by Jens Christian Aaberg as That Cause Can Never Be Lost Nor Stayed. Ostergaard died on October 9, 1931, in Tyler, Minnesota, and was buried at the Danebod Lutheran Cemetery.

== Selected works ==
- Fra Skov og Prærie (1883)
- Vesterlide (1889)
- Nybyggere (1891)
- Blokhuset (1892)
- Anton Arden (1897)
- Et Købmandshus (1909)
- Dalboerne (1913)
- Danby Folk (1927)

== Related Reading ==
- Mortensen, E. (1977) Schools for life: The Grundtvigianfolk schools in America (Askov, MN: American Publishing Co)
- Larson, D. C. (1980) The movement to preserve Danish culture in North America (Pittsburgh. PA: University Center for International Studies, University of Pittsburgh)
