= Theodore F. Bagge =

American politician

Theodore F. Bagge (November 30, 1820, Gentofte, København, Denmark – March 26, 1886, Oakland, California) was a Democratic member of the California State Assembly for the 14th District (the East Bay) from 1875 to 1877.
