= Elk Horn Creek =

Stream in Iowa, U.S.

Coordinates: 41.535545°N 95.125270°W

Elk Horn Creek is a stream in Cass, Shelby and Audubon counties, Iowa, in the United States.

Elk Horn Creek was so named from the fact settlers saw the bones of an elk near the stream.

== See also ==
- List of rivers of Iowa
