= Kristian Anker =

Kristian Anker (October 29, 1848 – November 16, 1928) was a Lutheran minister who served as the first president of the combined Trinity Seminary and Dana College.

Kristian Anker served as a Lutheran pastor in Elk Horn, Iowa, and Lincoln, Nebraska. Kristian Anker was pastor of St. Stephen's Evangelical Lutheran Church in Chicago from 1881 to 1882.

== Other sources ==
- E. Mortensen, Stories from Our Church (Des Moines, Iowa: 1952)
- P. C. Nyholm, The Americanization of the Danish Lutheran Churches (Copenhagen: 1963)
- J. M. Jensen, The United Evangelical Lutheran Church: An Interpretation (Minneapolis, Mn: 1964)

== Other reading ==
- Foght, Harold Waldstein Rural Denmark and its Schools (MacMillan New York: 1915)
- Schwieder, Dorothy Iowa: The Middle Land (University Of Iowa Press: 1996)
- Vig, P. S. Dansk Luthersk Mission i Amerika i Tiden för 1884 (Blair, Nebraska: 1917) Norwegian
