= Museum of Danish America =

Coordinates: 41°35′36″N 95°4′8″W

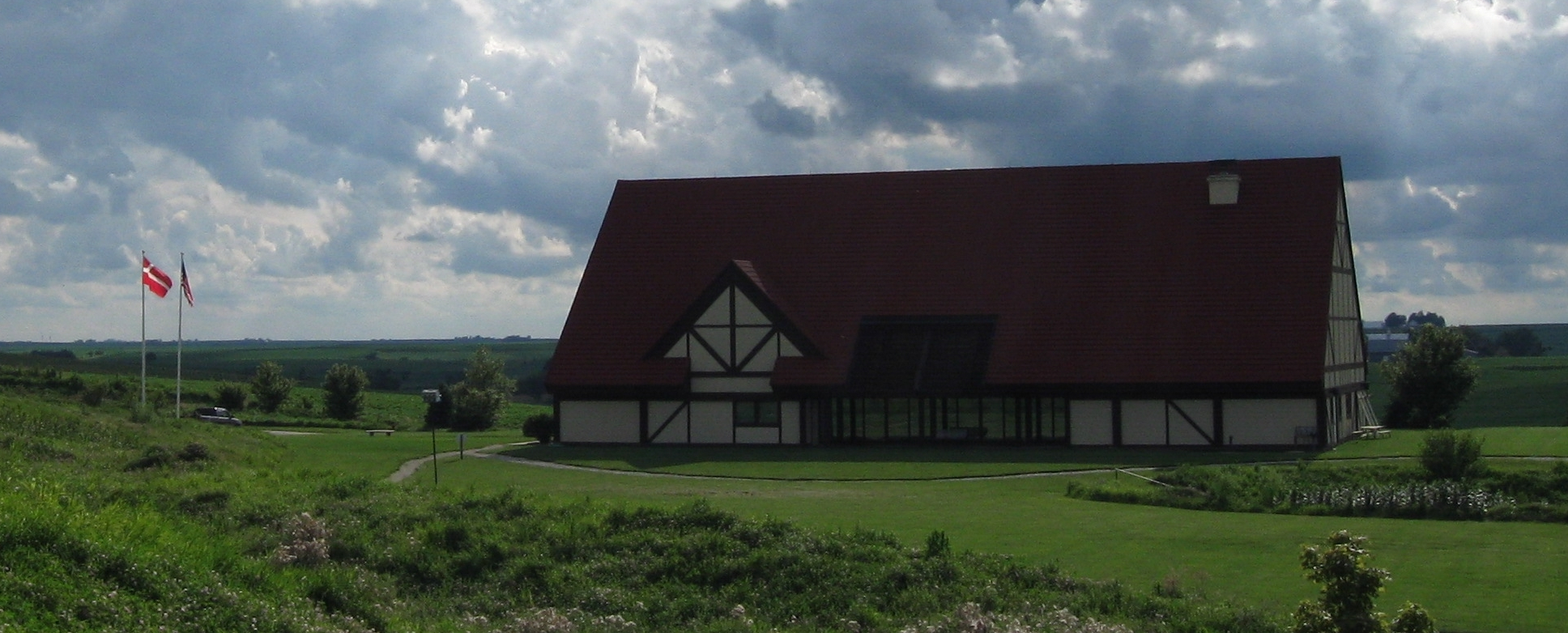
- Established: 1983
- Location: Elk Horn, Iowa
- Type: History Museum
- Website: https://www.danishmuseum.org/

The Museum of Danish America (formerly the Danish Immigrant Museum) is a national museum located in Elk Horn, Iowa. Its mission is to "celebrate Danish roots and American dreams."

== History ==
In 1979, two professors from Dana College proposed to the Dana College Board of Regents that a museum dedicated to the preservation of Danish immigrant heritage should be created. This proposal was met with approval, and a year later the Danish American Heritage Society (DAHS) was asked to form an exploratory committee. In 1983, the exploratory committee chose to locate the museum in the Danish Villages of Elk Horn and Kimballton, Iowa. The board was officially incorporated in May and in July the Elk Horn Lutheran Church donated 20 acres for the museum site. The museum began accepting donations to its collection and operated out of a building on Elk Horn's main street for several years. The groundbreaking ceremony for the museum's current building occurred in 1988, but the museum building did not open to the public until June 1994.

The museum changed its name from the Danish Immigrant Museum to the Museum of Danish America at its annual meeting on October 11, 2013.

Today, the museum's permanent collection consists of over 35,000 artifacts.

=== Expansion and the Jens Jensen Prairie Landscape Park ===
On 22 September 2010, the Danish Villages of Elk Horn and Kimballton, Iowa, were selected to join the Iowa Great Places Program. Included in the Elk Horn-Kimballton Great Places proposal was the development of the Jens Jensen Prairie Landscape Park on the museum's grounds.

The Jens Jensen Prairie Landscape Park was designed in 2011 and installed the following year. Jens Jensen was a Danish immigrant, and the park emulates and celebrates "the life and work" of Jens Jensen. The park is designed by Jens Jensen's great-great-grandson, also named Jens Jensen, and Bill Tishler, a professor emeritus of the University of Wisconsin-Madison and a Jensen scholar. The park incorporates native plants and includes two council rings, two trademarks of Jensen landscapes.

In 2013, a pergola exhibit with interpretive panels was installed near the entrance to the park. Later that year, nine pieces of Danish-designed outdoor fitness equipment was added along the recreational trail that winds through the park. The park also includes a 0.6 mile paved pedestrian path, the Friends Walk, that runs from the museum's main building to Bedstemor's House.

== Exhibits ==
The main museum building has three levels.

=== Lower level ===
The museum's permanent exhibition, Across Oceans, Across Time, begins on the museum's lower level. The exhibit explores the experience of Danish immigrants and their descendants from 1840 to 1940.

The lower level also contains the museum's visual storage area, where many of the museum's artifacts are stored behind glass walls, and it also contains a multimedia room.

=== Main level ===
The museum's permanent exhibition Across Oceans, Across Time continues on the ground level and covers the years from 1940 to the present day. This level also contains the Danish-American Artist Series exhibit, which showcases a different Danish-American artist every six months. Most recent artists featured in this series include artist Victor Borge in the exhibit The Victor Borge Legacy Award: Celebrating 10 Years of Music, which was showcased in the multimedia room. In addition to exhibits, this level of the museum houses the museum's Wall of Honor, the first piano owned by Danish immigrant performer Victor Borge, the museum gift shop and a Lego play area.

=== Kramme Gallery ===
The Kramme Gallery is on the upper level and houses the museum's temporary exhibits. The most recent temporary exhibit was the Tradition and Change: Weddings in Danish America, which will be followed by the exhibit Papirklip: A global and Timeless Art.

== Off-site properties ==
=== Genealogy and Education Center ===
In 1996, the museum's research library opened in-house and was initially staffed by volunteers. A librarian was hired in 2002. The following year, the Genealogy and Education Center opened at its current location on Elk Horn's Main Street.

In addition to its collection and resources, the Genealogy and Education Center offers translation and research services, as well as genealogy workshops, for a fee.

=== Jens Dixen House ===
Located just north of the museum building is an authentic North Dakota homesteader's cabin once occupied by Danish immigrant Jens Dixen. Jens Dixen settled near Kenmare, North Dakota circa 1901. A schoolteacher and preacher, Jens Dixen offered instruction to boys from the local area out of this house. During spells of bad winter weather, some of his students would sleep in the small space above the main floor room.

The Jens Dixen House was moved to the museum property in 1999 and restored by the Cedar Valley Danes. The house is open to visitors during the museum's regular operating hours.

=== Bedstemor's House ===
Bedstemor's House is a historic house museum located at the intersection of Union and College Street in Elk Horn, Iowa. The two-story Victorian home was built in 1908 by a Danish immigrant named Jens Otto Christiansen. The home was intended to be an engagement gift, but Christiansen's marriage proposal was rejected, and the house was rented out to local families instead. Christiansen sold the house to the Salem Old People's Home in 1933 for one dollar.

From 1946 to 1982, a woman of Danish descent named Meta Mortensen lived in the home. In 1982, Mortensen sold the home to the Elk Horn-Kimballton Arts and Recreational Council. The Council named the house Bedstemor's House, which means Grandmother's House in Danish, and operated it as a house museum for seven years. Bedstemor's House was deeded to The Danish Immigrant Museum in April 1990. The house was added to the National Register of Historic Places on 16 January 1997. Today, the house museum is interpreted circa 1910. Bedstemor's House is open between 1 PM and 4 PM from Memorial Day weekend through Labor Day, and by appointment the rest of the year.

A 3-part documentary video entitled "The Story of Bedstemor's House" is accessible through the museum's official website.
