= Jeffrey Breinholt =

American lawyer

- Born: Jeffrey Alan Breinholt; October 30, 1963 (age 62)
- Education: Yale College (BA); University of California, Los Angeles (JD)
- Occupation: Government Lawyer
- Spouse: Moni Sengupta

Jeffrey Alan Breinholt (born October 30, 1963) is an American lawyer. He has been an attorney with the United States Department of Justice National Security Division since 1990. In 2008, he joined the International Assessment and Strategy Center for a one-year stint as Senior Fellow and Director of National Security Law.

Breinholt earned his Bachelor of Arts from Yale College in 1985 and his Juris Doctor from the University of California, Los Angeles School of Law in 1988.

Breinholt has been Deputy Chief of the Counterterrorism Section at the U.S. Department of Justice and head of the Department of Justice's terrorist financing enforcement program since shortly before 9/11. He helped to create a special FBI unit devoted to U.S.-based fundraising by international terrorist organizations and the team of financial prosecutors he headed within the Counterterrorism Section is dedicated to prosecuting material support crimes. He was previously Special Assistant U.S. Attorney in the District of Utah.

Breinholt teaches a class entitled Criminal Tax Litigation at the George Washington University Law School.

A profile of Breinholt's legal work in the New York Times described Breinholt as believing that "terrorism prosecutions work" and that "American Muslims are prickly, litigious and poorly integrated into American society."

Breinholt is the older brother of Utah-based folk musician Peter Breinholt and is the husband of prominent international attorney, Moni SenGupta.

== Beliefs ==
In 2024, after his retirement, Breinholt spoke to USA Today about his expectations for the ongoing investigations into former president Donald Trump in relation to the January 6th attacks.

== Criticism ==
Breinholt attracted public attention when an article he published described public criticism of civil liberties as an "eccentric" concern.

== Books ==
- Counterterrorism Enforcement: A Lawyer’s Guide (DOJ Office of Legal Education 2004)
- Taxing Terrorism, From Al Capone to Al Qaida: Fighting Violence Through Financial Regulation (2007)
