= Peter Breinholt =

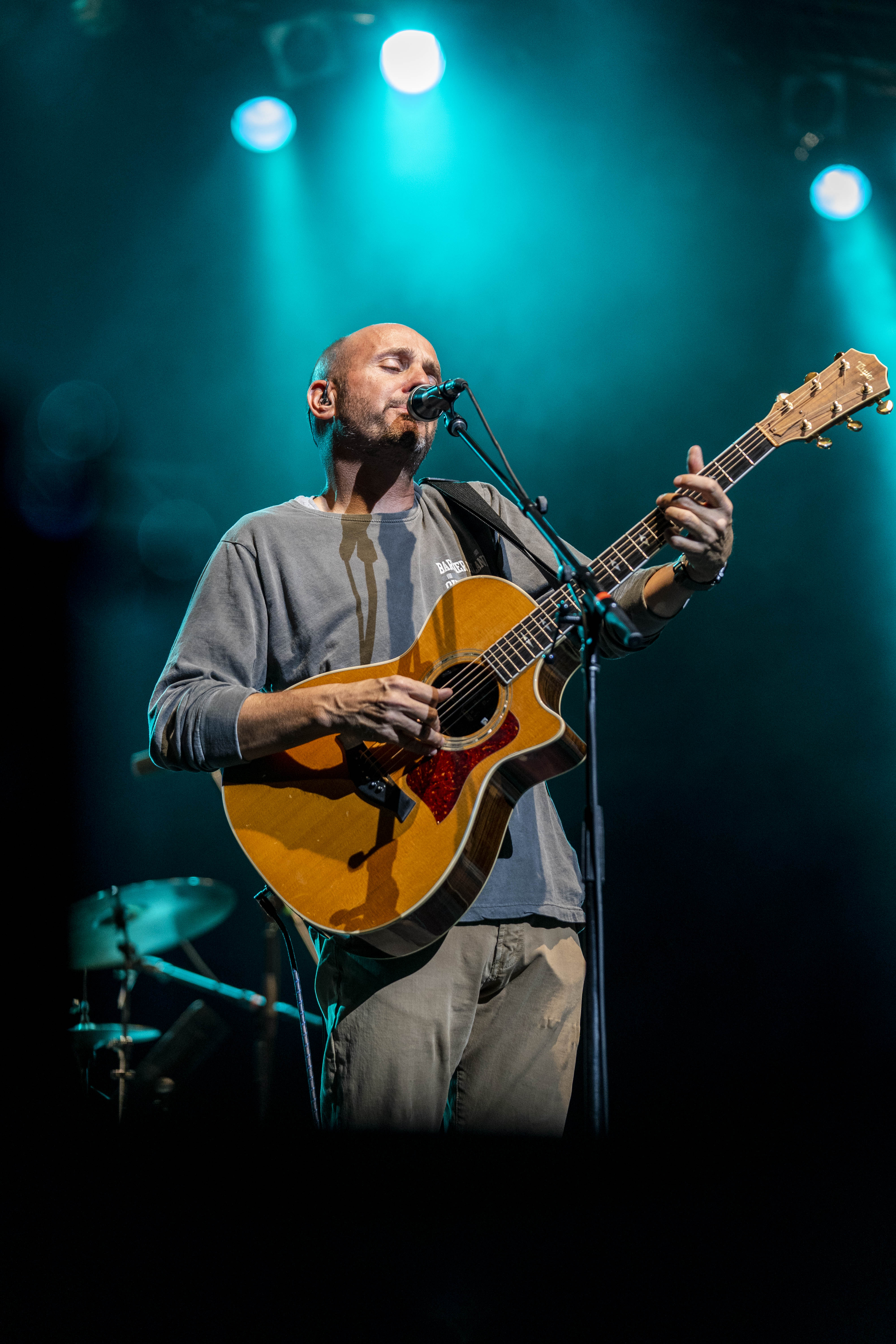
- Peter Breinholt performing in 2019

Background information
- Born: March 31, 1969 (age 57); Philadelphia, Pennsylvania, United States
- Genres: Folk, rock, pop
- Occupations: Singer-songwriter, producer, performer
- Instruments: guitar, piano, drums, ukulele, banjo, bass
- Years active: 1993–present
- Website: peterbreinholt.com

Peter Breinholt is a recording artist in the Salt Lake City, Utah music scene.

Breinholt grew up in Philadelphia, where his father Robert H. Breinholt taught at the Wharton School of Business at the University of Pennsylvania. When Peter was ten years old his family moved to Salt Lake City. He is the brother of Jeffrey Breinholt. He has three other siblings.

== Career ==
While Breinholt was a student at the University of Utah, he and friends Mike Ensign and Rex Griffiths made an amateur recording of songs Breinholt had written and called it "Songs About the Great Divide". It became the best-selling independently released album ever in the state of Utah up to that time almost entirely by word-of-mouth. Salt Lake Magazine later described the album as "an underground classic on Utah college campuses". Almost overnight, Breinholt's concerts began selling out 2,000-plus seat theaters throughout the region. The success of the album and subsequent performances would lead to the release of Heartland (1996) and Deep Summer (1999). Since then Breinholt has continued to release and perform music.

In 2018, Breinholt and his family moved to Canoa, Ecuador where he wrote songs for his fifth album of original music entitled "The Counting Of Nothing" released later that year.

In March 2019, Peter gave a TEDx talk in Provo, Utah, entitled "What Makes You Come Alive?".

== Personal life ==
Peter is married to Becca Pulsipher Breinholt and they have four children. They currently live in The Avenues area of Salt Lake City.

== Recordings ==
- Songs about the Great Divide (1993)
- Heartland (1996)
- Deep Summer (1999)
- Live September (2001)
- Noel (2002)
- All the Color Green (2006)
- The Best of Peter Breinholt (May 2008)
- The Counting of Nothing (2018)
