= National Register of Historic Places listings in Harrison County, Iowa =

Location of Harrison County in Iowa

This is intended to be a complete list of the properties and districts on the National Register of Historic Places in Harrison County, Iowa, United States. Latitude and longitude coordinates are provided for many National Register properties and districts; these locations may be seen together in a map.

There are 13 properties and districts listed on the National Register in the county, including one National Historic Landmark.

This National Park Service list is complete through NPS recent listings posted March 21, 2025.

	Name on the Register	Image	Date listed	Location	City or town	Description
1	William Haner Polygonal Barn		June 30, 1986 (#86001435)	County Road L16; 41°49′14″N 95°49′25″W	Pisgah	
2	Harrison County Courthouse	Harrison County Courthouse	July 2, 1981 (#81000243)	7th St. 41°38′37″N 95°47′23″W	Logan	
3	I.O.O.F. Hall	I.O.O.F. Hall	June 23, 2011 (#11000391)	613-615 Iowa Ave. 41°51′16″N 95°36′03″W	Dunlap	
4	Modale School and Masonic Hall		February 5, 2014 (#13001136)	107 S. Main St. 41°37′09″N 96°00′44″W	Modale	
5	Murray General Merchandise Store		July 31, 1998 (#98000930)	Junction of Mulberry and 2nd Sts. 41°48′34″N 96°01′28″W	Little Sioux	
6	Old Harrison County Courthouse		February 24, 1983 (#83000365)	401 Locust; 41°41′39″N 95°52′17″W	Magnolia	
7	Siebels' Department Store-Boyer Valley Bank	Siebels' Department Store-Boyer Valley Bank	June 6, 2012 (#12000327)	501-505 Walker St. 41°44′14″N 95°42′08″W	Woodbine	
8	State Savings Bank	State Savings Bank	April 18, 1985 (#85000836)	312 E. 7th St. 41°38′34″N 95°47′15″W	Logan	
9	John R. Wheeler Jr. House		November 4, 1986 (#86003171)	407 S. 3rd St. 41°51′04″N 95°36′11″W	Dunlap	
10	Woodbine Lincoln Highway and Brick Street Historic District	Woodbine Lincoln Highway and Brick Street Historic District	January 29, 2013 (#12001083)	101–524 Lincoln Way, 303–524 Walker, parts of 5th, 4th, & 3rd Sts. 41°44′10″N 95°42′11″W	Woodbine	
11	Woodbine Normal and Grade School	Woodbine Normal and Grade School	November 18, 2002 (#02001227)	5th and Weare; 41°44′15″N 95°42′24″W	Woodbine	
12	Woodbine Public Library	Woodbine Public Library	May 23, 1997 (#97000462)	58 5th St. 41°44′13″N 95°42′13″W	Woodbine	
13	Woodbine Savings Bank	Woodbine Savings Bank	March 27, 2012 (#12000167)	424 Walker St. 41°44′11″N 95°42′07″W	Woodbine	

== Former listings ==
	Name on the Register	Image	Date listed	Date removed	Location	City or town	Description
1	Harrison County Jail		April 14, 1983 (#83004517)	May 10, 2006	105 South First Avenue	Logan	

== See also ==
- List of National Historic Landmarks in Iowa
- National Register of Historic Places listings in Iowa
- Listings in neighboring counties: Burt (NE), Crawford, Monona, Pottawattamie, Washington (NE)
