= Little Sioux =

Little Sioux can be the name of one of two places in Iowa, the United States:

- Little Sioux, Iowa, a small town in Harrison County
- The Little Sioux Scout Ranch, a Boy Scouts of America camp near the town.
- The Little Sioux River
