= Beebeetown, Iowa =

- Unincorporated community
- Location within Iowa Location within the United States
- Coordinates: 41°31′16″N 95°45′20″W
- Country: United States
- State: Iowa
- County: Harrison
- Elevation: 1,326 ft (404 m)
- Time zone: UTC-6 (CST)
  - Summer (DST): UTC-5 (CDT)
- GNIS feature ID: 454479

Beebeetown is an unincorporated town in Harrison County, Iowa, USA.

== History ==
Beebeetown was founded in 1880. The population was 50 in 1940.

In 1913, a violent tornado would strike Beebeetown, killing 2 children.

Beebeetown Highschool was closed in 1978 and consolidated with Persia, Iowa and Neola, Iowa's school districts to form Tri-Center School District.

Beebeetown is home to the Twisted Tail Restaurant, a diner that won the 2020 Iowa Cattlemen Competition burger competition.
