= Yorkshire (disambiguation) =

Yorkshire is a historic county in England.

Yorkshire may also refer to:

- Yorkshire dialect

== Place-names of England derived from the historic shire name ==
- East Riding of Yorkshire, a traditional division of the British county and the name of a unitary authority in England since 1996
  - East Yorkshire (district), a local government district in England between 1974 and 1996
- North Riding of Yorkshire, a traditional division of the British county and an administrative county in England between 1889 and 1974
  - North Yorkshire, a non-metropolitan county and (larger) ceremonial county in England since 1974
- West Riding of Yorkshire, a traditional division of the British county and an administrative county in England between 1889 and 1974
  - South Yorkshire, a metropolitan county in England since 1974
  - West Yorkshire, a metropolitan county in England since 1974
- Yorkshire (UK Parliament constituency) (1290–1832)
- Yorkshire and the Humber, government office region of England, created in 1994 as Yorkshire and Humberside
- Yorkshire and the Humber (European Parliament constituency), created in 1999

== United States ==
- Yorkshire, Iowa
- Yorkshire (CDP), New York
- Yorkshire (town), New York
- York Shire (Province of New York)
- Yorkshire, Ohio
- Yorkshire, Virginia

== Other uses ==
- Yorkshire Building Society, a UK financial institution
- Yorkshire County Cricket Club, a first class county cricket club
- Yorkshire pudding, a traditional type of food in England
- Yorkshire Square, a fermentation system for beer
- ITV Yorkshire, a television company in England
- Yorkshire Terrier, a breed of dog
- Yorkshire Ripper, a British mass murderer
- Yorkshire Tiger, a former bus company now known as Team Pennine
- Yorkshire Hotel, a historic building in Los Angeles, California

== See also ==
- Yorkshire Cup (disambiguation)
- Yorkshire Dales
- Yorkshire Day
- Yorkshire Wolds
