= Joseph E. Mills =

American architect

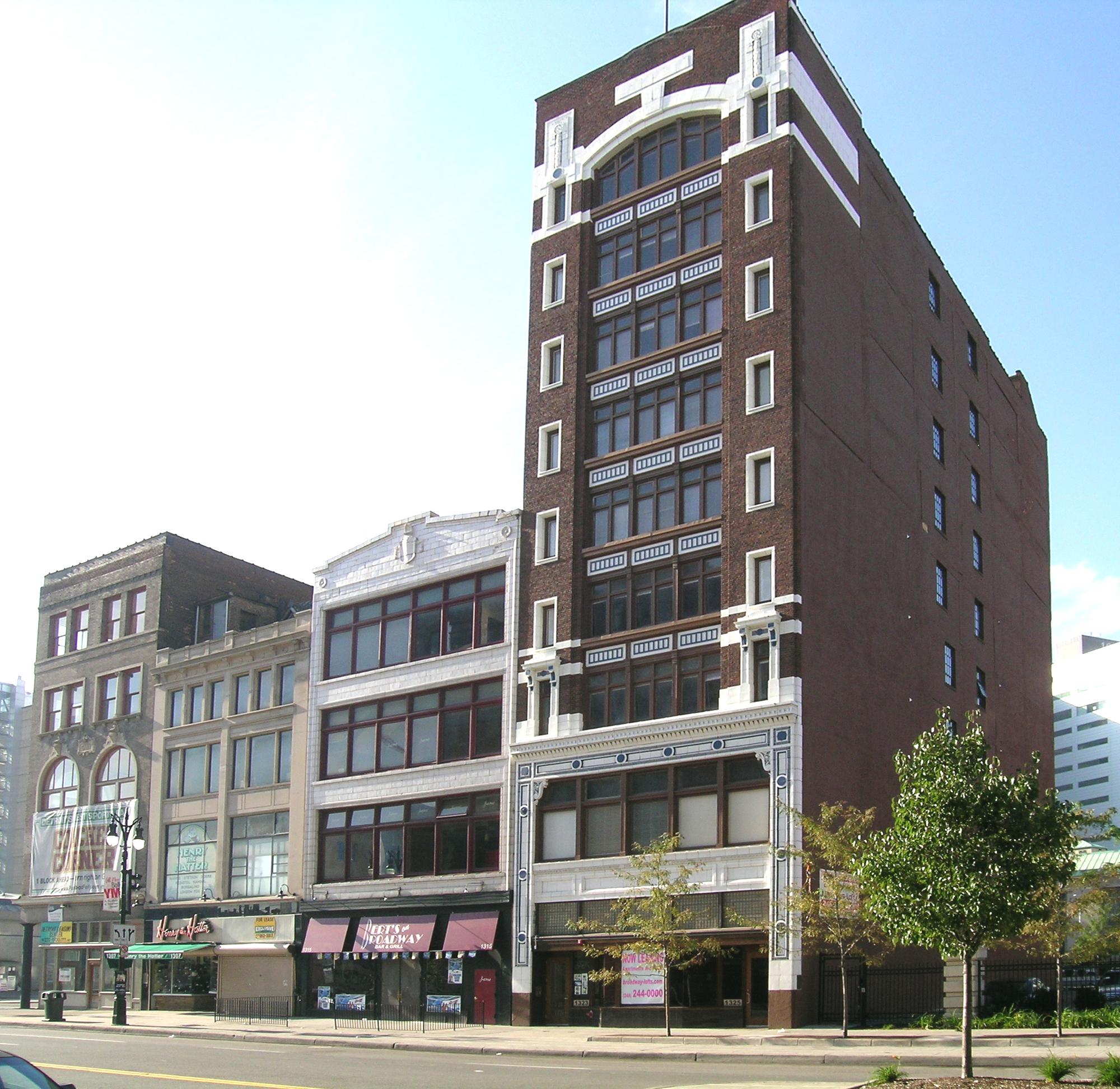
West side of Broadway Avenue in the Broadway Avenue Historic District, Lafer Brothers Building on the right

Joseph E. Mills was an architect based in Detroit, Michigan. He designed the Muscatine County Courthouse in Muscatine County, Michigan, which is listed on the National Register of Historic Places. He also worked on buildings in Ionia, Michigan and on the Harrison County Courthouse in Logan, Iowa, county seat of Harrison County, Iowa.

== Works ==
Works include:

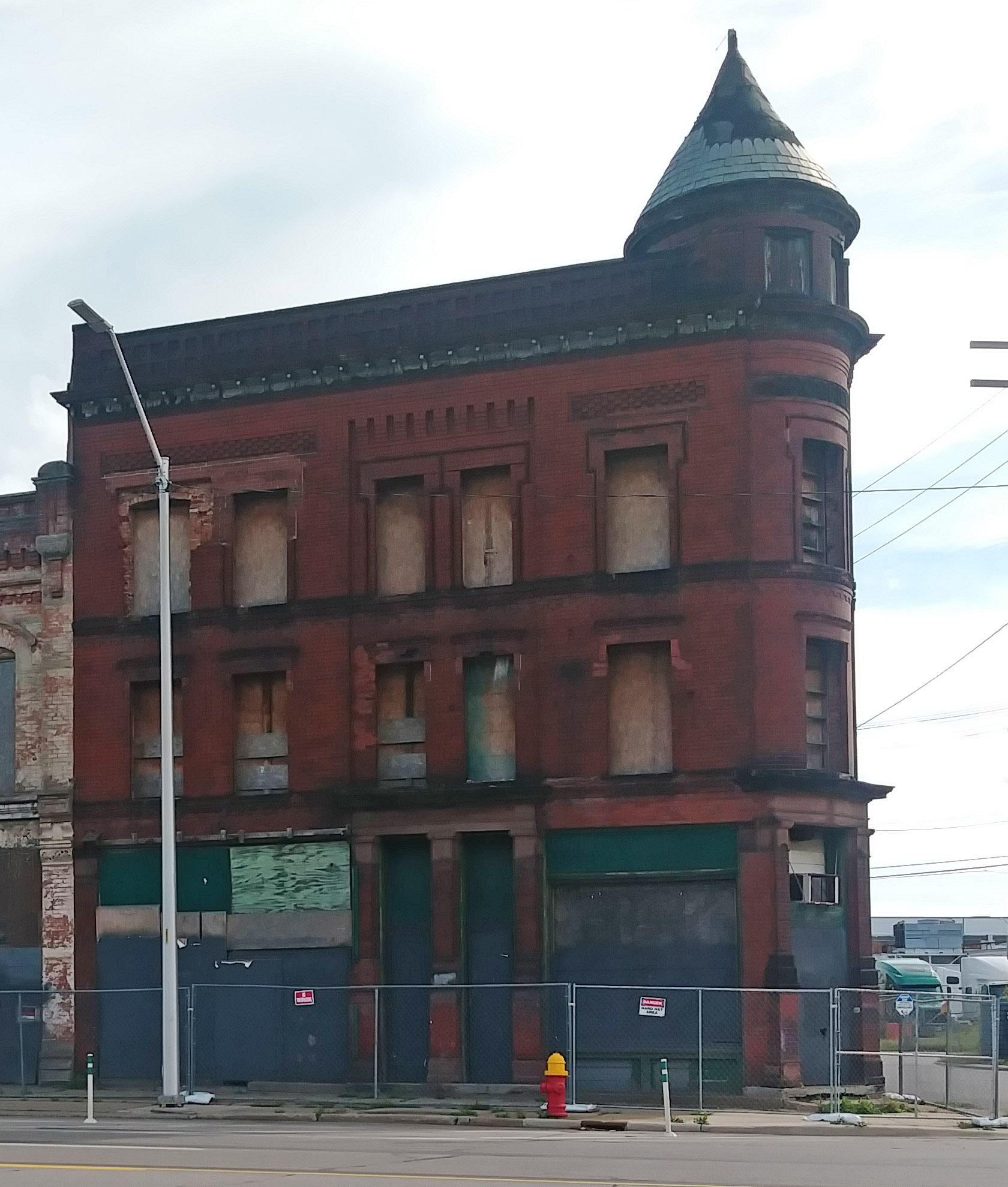
Grosfield Building in 2019

- Lyman M. Brackett House (1886) at 328 W. 9th St. Rochester, Indiana
- Grosfield Building (1893) at 3365 Michigan Avenue, Detroit, Michigan, now part of the Michigan Avenue Historic Commercial District
- Oakland County Courthouse (1905) in Pontiac, Michigan
- Three buildings in Muscatine, Iowa:
  - Muscatine County Courthouse (1909), 3rd and 4th Sts between Walnut and Mulberry, individually listed on the National Register,
  - Muscatine County Jail (1909), a separate project at 4th and Walnut for which Mills was also selected, and
  - City Hall (1914), 215 Sycamore Street, Classical Revival office building for City of Muscatine office included in Muscatine's Downtown Commercial Historic District).
- John J. Petz House at 3515 Burns in Detroit
- Lafer Brothers Building in Detroit's Broadway Avenue Historic District
- Louis A. Peters House at 759 Seminole in Detroit
- Richard H. Macauley House at 270 East Ferry Avenue in Detroit
- Maranatha Baptist Tabernacle (1919), became known as the Jam Handy and was used for film production
- Harrison County Courthouse (1911) in Logan, Iowa, county seat of Harrison County, Iowa
- 399 St. Clair in Grosse Pointe (part of the Cadieux School complex)

== Other ==
J. Lawson Miller (1878-1969), who became "widely known as a remarkably original and artistic architect," worked as a draftsman or in other capacity for Mills, among other Detroit architects, before becoming one himself.
