= Logan–Magnolia Community School District =

Public school district in Logan, Iowa, United States

Location
- Logan, Iowa (Harrison County), Iowa, 51546; United States

District information
- Type: Distant Rural
- Motto: Relentlessly pursuing educational excellence for every child, every day
- Grades: PreK–12
- Superintendent: Jacob Hedger
- Schools: 2
- Budget: $9,226,000 (2020-21)
- NCES District ID: 1917460

Students and staff
- Students: 725 (2022-2023)
- Teachers: 51.69 FTE
- Staff: 51.38 FTE
- Student–teacher ratio: 14.03
- Athletic conference: Western Iowa
- District mascot: Panthers
- Colors: Purple and gold

Other information
- Website: www.lomaschools.org

The Logan–Magnolia Community School District is a rural public school district headquartered in Logan, Iowa.

The district is completely within Harrison County, and serves Logan, Magnolia, and the surrounding rural areas.

The school mascot is the Panther and the colors are purple and gold.

== Schools ==
The district operates two schools, located in a single facility in Logan:

- Logan–Magnolia Elementary School
- Logan–Magnolia Jr./Sr. High School

=== Logan–Magnolia High School ===
==== Academics ====
In the 2025-2026 rankings released by US News and World Report, Logan-Magnolia High School is ranked #64 out of 353 high schools in the state. This ranking is based on graduation rate, reading proficiency, math proficiency, and science proficiency. Since the district is also located within the Omaha Metropolitan Area, Logan-Magnolia ranks #14 out of Metro schools.

==== Athletics ====
The Panthers compete in the Western Iowa Conference in the following sports:

- Cross country
  - 2-time Girls class 1A state champions (2018, 2019)
- Volleyball
- Football
  - 2-time class A state champions (1990, 2014)
- Basketball
- Wrestling
  - 2-time class 1A state champions (2005, 2011)
  - 2-time class 1A state duals champions (2003, 2011)
- Track and field
  - 2-time Girls class 2A state champions (2009, 2011)
- Golf
- Soccer
- Baseball
- Softball

=== Fight song ===
Logan-Magnolia High uses the same fight song as the University of Illinois at Urbana-Champaign with minor word changes.

== See also ==
- List of school districts in Iowa
- List of high schools in Iowa
