= River Sioux, Iowa =

- Census-designated place
- Location within Iowa Location within the United States
- Coordinates: 41°48′09″N 96°02′53″W
- Country: USA
- State: Iowa
- County: Harrison
- Township: Little Sioux

Area
  - Total: 0.38 sq mi (0.99 km^{2})
  - Land: 0.38 sq mi (0.99 km^{2})
  - Water: 0 sq mi (0.00 km^{2})
- Elevation: 1,037 ft (316 m)

Population (2020)
  - Total: 42
  - Density: 110.4/sq mi (42.61/km^{2})
- Time zone: UTC-6 (Central (CST))
  - Summer (DST): UTC-5 (CDT)
- ZIP code: 51545
- Area code: 712
- FIPS code: 19-67530
- GNIS feature ID: 2583493

River Sioux is an unincorporated community and census-designated place (CDP) in Harrison County, Iowa, United States. As of the 2020 Census the population was 42.

== History ==
River Sioux was platted in 1868 when the railroad was extended to that point. It was named after the nearby Little Sioux River.

The population was estimated at 100 in 1940.

== Education ==
River Sioux is zoned to the West Harrison Community School District.

== Demographics ==
Historical population
Census	Pop.	Note	%±
2010	59		—
2020	42		−28.8%
U.S. Decennial Census

=== 2020 census ===
As of the census of 2020, there were 42 people, 17 households, and 7 families residing in the community. The population density was 110.4 inhabitants per square mile (42.6/km^{2}). There were 28 housing units at an average density of 73.6 per square mile (28.4/km^{2}). The racial makeup of the community was 95.2% White, 0.0% Black or African American, 0.0% Native American, 0.0% Asian, 0.0% Pacific Islander, 0.0% from other races and 4.8% from two or more races. Hispanic or Latino persons of any race comprised 4.8% of the population.

Of the 17 households, 17.6% of which had children under the age of 18 living with them, 35.3% were married couples living together, 5.9% were cohabitating couples, 41.2% had a female householder with no spouse or partner present and 17.6% had a male householder with no spouse or partner present. 58.8% of all households were non-families. 58.8% of all households were made up of individuals, 29.4% had someone living alone who was 65 years old or older.

The median age in the community was 48.0 years. 33.3% of the residents were under the age of 20; 0.0% were between the ages of 20 and 24; 9.5% were from 25 and 44; 28.6% were from 45 and 64; and 28.6% were 65 years of age or older. The gender makeup of the community was 64.3% male and 35.7% female.
