= Tri-Center Community School District =

Public school district in Neola, Iowa, United States

Location
- Neola, Iowa Pottawattamie County and Harrison County United States

District information
- Type: Local school district
- Grades: K-12
- Superintendent: Dr. Angie Huseman
- Schools: 3
- Budget: $10,330,000 (2020–21)
- NCES District ID: 1927990

Students and staff
- Students: 724 (2022–23)
- Teachers: 54.74 FTE
- Staff: 69.14 FTE
- Student–teacher ratio: 13.23
- Athletic conference: Western Iowa
- District mascot: Trojans
- Colors: Black and Gold

Other information
- Website: www.tctrojans.org

The Tri-Center Community School District is a rural public school district headquartered in Neola, Iowa.

Established in 1962, the high school and elementary campus is located on I-880; 25 miles (40 km) northeast of Council Bluffs, and 100 miles (160 km) west from Des Moines.

The district spans northern Pottawattamie County and southern Harrison County. It serves Neola, Minden, Persia, and the surrounding rural areas, including Beebeetown.

== Governance ==
The district operates three schools, all in Neola:

- Tri-Center Elementary School
- Tri-Center Middle School
- Tri-Center High School

== Tri-Center High School ==
The school is a 7-A school.

Tri-Center High School

Location
- 33980 310th St; Neola, Iowa 51559; United States; 41°30′17″N 95°35′42″W

Information
- Type: Public secondary
- Established: 1962; 64 years ago
- Principal: Chad Harder
- Enrollment: 225 (2024-2025)

=== Campus ===
Tri-Center features a fully networked campus that is equipped with telecommunications, internet, projection systems, and satellite capabilities in each classroom. A fiber optics room for long-distance learning is also available, as well as three traditional 24-station computer labs. In addition to this, a 20-station terminal services lab has been established in the M.S./H.S. library/media center to enhance the reading and research process, and 12 wireless mobile PC laptops labs (each filled with laptops), have been incorporated in the elementary, middle, and high schools to assist with student learning, internet usage, and the implementation of the Accelerated Reader and Accelerated Math Programs.

=== Sports ===
The Trojans compete in the Western Iowa Conference in the following sports:

- Basketball
- Football
  - 2024 Class A State Champions
- Baseball
  - 1987 Class 2A State Champions
- Basketball
- Volleyball
- Wrestling
- Soccer
- Bowling
- Cross Country
- Track and Field
  - Boys' 2001 Class 2A State Champions
  - Girls' 2004 Class 1A State Champions
- Softball
- Golf

=== School Song ===
The school song is a rendition of the University of Minnesota's Minnesota Rouser

Tri, Tri, Tri, Tri, Tri-Center High

Cheer, cheer, cheer, cheer, cheer to the sky,

And really fight, fight, fight, fight, fight hard for fame,

Fight and strive for Victory, Backed by Trojan loyalty,

Go team to win this game.

== See also ==
- List of school districts in Iowa
- List of high schools in Iowa
