= Yorkshire, Iowa =

- unincorporated community
- Location within Iowa
- Coordinates: 41°31′14″N 95°34′48″W
- Country: United States
- State: Iowa
- County: Harrison
- Elevation: 1,175 ft (358 m)
- Time zone: UTC-6 (Central (CST))
  - Summer (DST): UTC-5 (CDT)
- GNIS feature ID: 463247

Yorkshire is an unincorporated community in Harrison County, in the U.S. state of Iowa.

== History ==
Yorkshire was founded with the arrival of the Chicago, Milwaukee and St. Paul Railroad. Yorkshire was platted in June 1872 by the railroad company and a store was built soon thereafter. Yorkshire was the stop between Persia, Iowa, and Neola, Iowa. The Yorkshire Post Office opened on November 3, 1885, and a number of businesses soon followed.

Yorkshire's population was 25 in 1887, 30 in 1902, and 34 in 1925.

On June 3, 1925, a pair of tornadoes, estimated at F4 (possibly F5) intensity on the Fujita scale, struck Yorkshire and nearby Persia. The damage was widespread in both communities, and in Yorkshire, the community "lost a depot, local store, church, schoolhouse and a number of residential homes." An infant was killed near Persia.

The population was 21 in 1940. The Yorkshire Post Office closed on October 30, 1943.
