= Lincoln Township, Harrison County, Iowa =

Township in Iowa, USA

Coordinates: 41°49′N 95°44′W

Lincoln Township is a township in Harrison County, Iowa, United States.
