= Calhoun Township, Harrison County, Iowa =

Township in Iowa, United States

Coordinates: 41°38′N 95°52′W

Calhoun Township is a township in Harrison County, Iowa, United States.
