= Morgan Township, Harrison County, Iowa =

Township in Iowa, USA

Coordinates: 41°43′N 96°03′W

Morgan Township is a township in Harrison County, Iowa, USA.
