= State Savings Bank (Logan, Iowa) =

- U.S. National Register of Historic Places
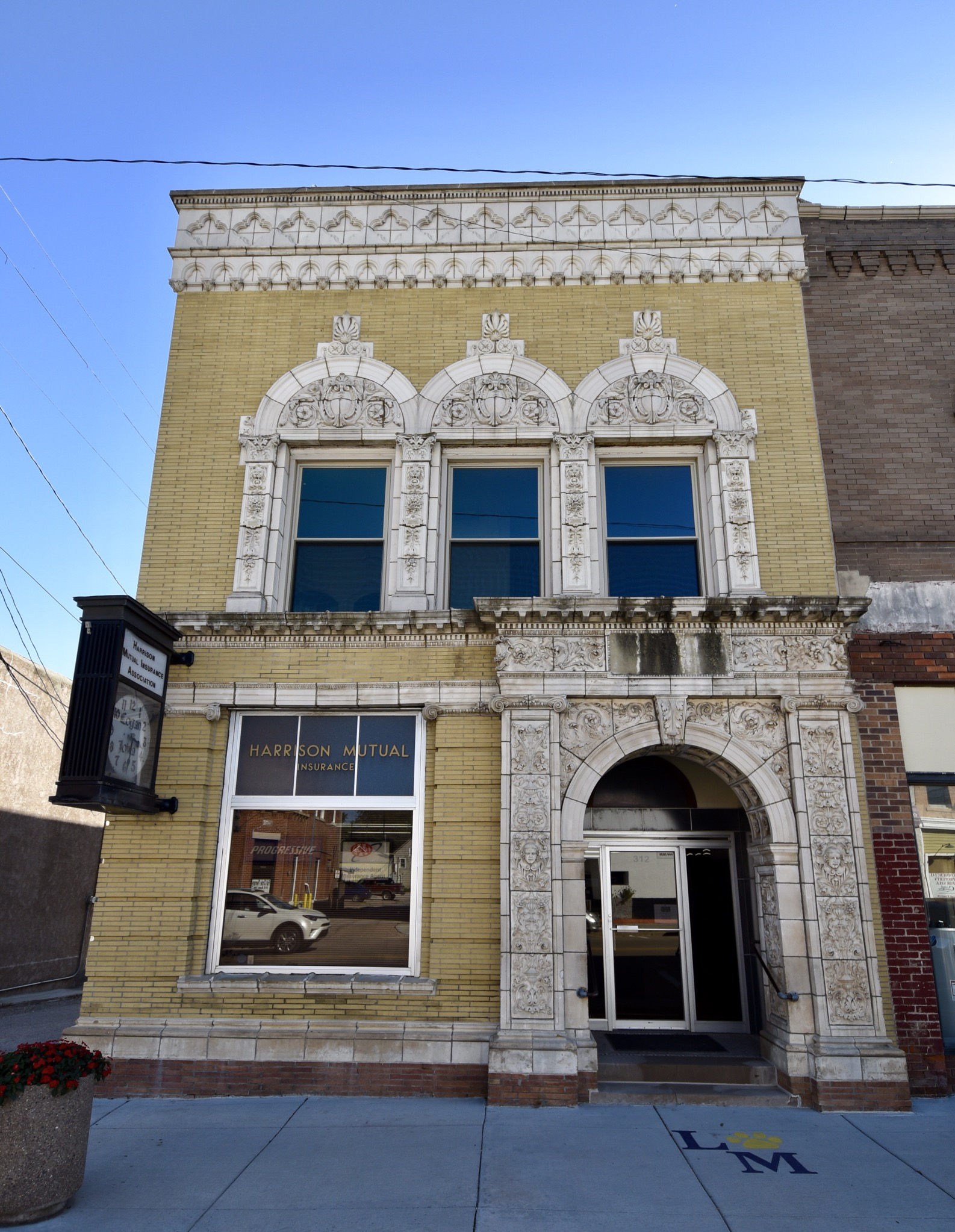

- Location within Iowa Location within the United States
- Location: 312 E. 7th St. Logan, Iowa
- Coordinates: 41°38′34″N 95°47′15.3″W
- Area: less than one acre
- Built: 1902
- NRHP reference No.: 85000836
- Added to NRHP: April 18, 1985

State Savings Bank, also known as Harrison Mutual Insurance Association, is a historic building located in Logan, Iowa, United States. Founded in 1888, the bank built this building in 1902. It is a two-story brick structure with terra cotta ornamentation. Its wrap-around design is made possible for this mid-block building by its alley location. State Savings Bank was one of four banks that operated in the town over its history. It failed in 1923. After the building sat empty for five years Harrison Mutual Insurance Association purchased the building. It was listed on the National Register of Historic Places in 1985.
