= Allen Township, Harrison County, Iowa =

Township in Iowa, USA

Coordinates: 41°49′N 95°51′W

Allen Township is a township in Harrison County, Iowa, United States. It was constituted in 1872 and is a rural area known for its fertile soil and agricultural productivity. Named after an early settler, it features several small creeks and limited native timber.

The township's population grew from 300 in 1885 to 574 in 1890. Despite lacking towns, villages, or railroads, which necessitates longer travel for farmers to market their crops, Allen Township maintains a reputation for rural prosperity and successful farming operations.
