= Little Sioux Scout Ranch =

Scout camp in Little Sious, Iowa

- Owner: Iowa Natural Heritage Foundation
- Location: Little Sioux, Iowa
- Country: United States
- Coordinates: 41°52′40″N 95°58′50″W
- Website; Official website

The Little Sioux Scout Ranch is a 1,800-acre (730 ha) Scout reservation owned and operated by the Iowa Natural Heritage Foundation. It is located in Little Sioux, Iowa, about sixty miles north of Omaha, Nebraska in Iowa's Loess Hills and 15 minutes east of Interstate 29.

Hiking trails cover the camp, which is forested with mowed meadows and has both developed and remote campsites. There are also four cabin shelters and a 15-acre (6.1 ha) lake. The Mutual of Omaha Administration Building was completed in 2000, and two years later the MidAmerican Energy Pavilion was finished, seating 300 at picnic tables. Individual packs, troops and posts use the facility, along with Order of the Arrow conclaves, and district and council camporees. Pahuk Pride, a week-long National Youth Leadership Training event, was held annually at the camp until 2017.

The camp was the site of a tornado that killed four Boy Scouts and injured 48 others on June 11, 2008. Many awards for heroism were awarded. The camp reopened in 2009.

In 2021, the Gilwell Foundation announced its intention to sell the camp, citing declining attendance. In January 2023, the Iowa Natural Heritage Foundation (INHF) announced that it had signed an agreement to purchase Little Sioux Scout Ranch.

== June 2008 tornado ==
At 6:35 p.m. CDT on June 11, 2008 an EF3 tornado struck the camp during a Pahuk Pride National Youth Leadership Training (NYLT). There were 93 boys and 25 youth and adult staff members in attendance; four boys were killed and 48 injured. Scouts attending the weeklong Pahuk Pride event at the camp were from Nebraska, Iowa, and South Dakota.

The National Weather Service office in Valley, Nebraska said they issued a tornado warning 12 minutes before the twister hit the camp. People at the camp reported having five minutes between sighting the funnel cloud and touch down at the camp. Some reports indicated that a relay hub that would have alerted the scouts sooner was temporarily inoperable as it had been struck by lightning and was in a restart sequence when the original warning was issued. The actual sounding of the tornado siren at the camp was due to manual activation of the camps siren from a staff member in the Mutual of Omaha Welcome Building. According to a camp counselor, nearly all the injuries and fatalities happened when a small cabin that some campers took shelter in was destroyed by the tornado. The Scouts were split into two groups for the event and had taken shelter in two different buildings when the storm hit. The tornado was one of 28 reported in that time period, spread across eastern Kansas and into Nebraska, Iowa, and Minnesota. Many of the injuries were reported to have happened when a brick fireplace in the northern shelter, where the Scouts were taking cover, was destroyed by the tornado winds. A truck parked outside was thrown through the air and may have struck the building.

The tornado killed Josh Fennen, 13; Sam Thomsen, 13; Ben Petrzilka, 14, all from Omaha and Aaron Eilerts, 14, from Eagle Grove, Iowa. The Scouts' first aid training was immediately used. MSNBC asked Ethan Hession, 13, "You said, 'If it had to happen it is good it happened at a Boy Scout Camp.' Why would you at the age of 13 say such a thing?" Hession replied, "Because we were prepared. We knew that shock could happen. We knew that we need to place tourniquets on wounds that were bleeding too much. We knew we need to apply pressure and gauze. We had first-aid kits, we had everything."

The Boy Scouts at the camp, including some injured, immediately began to administer first aid and assist their injured fellow campers. The chief of the local volunteer department, Ed Osius, said, "It’s the scouts that saved a lot of lives." According to the local Omaha World-Herald, the wounded were taken to several locations.

- Four were brought to the Saint Joseph Hospital at Creighton University Medical Center in Omaha, all in stable and good condition;
- Four were brought to Mercy Medical Center in Sioux City, Iowa, and were in stable condition;
- Nineteen were taken to Burgess Medical Center in Onawa, Iowa;
- Fourteen were taken to Community Memorial Hospital in Missouri Valley, Iowa. Three of those were transferred to Creighton, and;
- Eight were brought to Memorial Community Hospital and Health System in Blair, Nebraska, one in critical condition. Parents expressed frustration and anxiety about communication problems that kept them from knowing the status of their children.

Surviving Boy Scouts were taken to West Harrison High School in nearby Mondamin, Iowa to wait for their parents to pick them up. Some boys reportedly waited up to five hours. The Omaha Police Department helicopter conducted an infrared scan of the camp early in the morning on June 12, despite the fact that as of 12:00 midnight CST all people have been accounted for. A police lieutenant suggested it may just be as a precaution. As many as 42 Scouts remained hospitalized the following morning with wounds ranging from cuts and bruises to major head trauma.

=== Aftermath ===
Many acts of bravery occurred during and after the storm. Both Nebraska and Iowa governors praised the actions of the surviving Scouts. Governor of Nebraska Dave Heineman said in a statement, "I want to thank the scouts and the scout leaders who helped in the aftermath of the storm. They responded in true Boy Scout fashion." Governor of Iowa Chet Culver said at a press conference the following morning, "There were some real heroes at the Scout camp. They set up triage and were taking care of one another and saved many lives before emergency responders arrived". Later in the day on June 12, both governors were joined by Secretary of Homeland Security Michael Chertoff, who toured the devastated camp and afterwards expressed the condolences of U.S. President George W. Bush to the families of the dead Scouts. Chertoff said he was "particularly touched by the finest young people from this region being caught up in the ... terrible tragedy", adding that, "the reaction of the Boy Scouts was in the best tradition of what they're being taught." Chief Scout Executive Bob Mazzucca planned to visit the council and help assist families of the Scouts, and has launched an appeal to fellow Scouts for relief funds.

On September 8, 2008, Lieutenant Governor of Nebraska Rick Sheehy presented the first–ever Be Prepared Local Hero award to the Mid-America Council Pahuk Pride Class of 2008 because of their preparation for and taking care of each other during and after the tornado struck. On September 13, 2008, those who died in the storm were presented the Spirit of the Eagle Award, a posthumous award from the Boy Scouts of America. Also on September 13, 2008, the Boy Scouts of America's National Court of Honor awarded 121 medals for heroism to Scouts and Scout leaders for their actions during the tornado: 75 Medals of Merit, 30 Heroism awards, 7 Honor Medals, and 9 Honor Medals with Crossed Palm.

=== Controversy ===
While most praise the actions of the Scouts in the aftermath of the tornado, many question the absence of a tornado shelter on the grounds. In a press conference on June 12, 2008, Lloyd Roitstein, Scout Executive with the Mid-America Council of the Boy Scouts of America is quoted as saying, "Absolutely not" to a question about whether the camp grounds had a tornado shelter. On June 13, 2008, the Omaha World-Herald quoted Roitstein as saying "One of the things you learn in Scouting, one of the skills you learn is what happens when you're out in the wilderness and severe weather. "And we teach them of course to go to the lowest-lying area, go into a ditch and get down as low as you can. Because when you're out hiking in the mountains or canoeing down a river or whatever, there are no storm shelters." The lack of tornado shelters is a topic of debate. Bryan and Arnell Petrzilka of Omaha, whose son Ben was killed in the storm, are heading a project to add tornado shelters to the Little Sioux Ranch and possibly others in the area. A fund for donations has been set up with the Omaha State Bank.

=== Reconstruction ===
FEMA declared Monona County along with the Little Sioux Scout Ranch a disaster area. On July 26, 2008, volunteers from the Shelby County Rescue and Recovery Team along with 22 professional loggers helped to clear out damaged and destroyed trees at the Ranch. The Mid-America Council of the Boy Scouts of America have announced plans to rebuild the ranch and as of late July 2008 had raised $225,459 of the 1.8 million dollars estimated to rebuild. There is also plans to construct a memorial at the site. The Ranger's House was the 1st building to be reconstructed. On September 3–6, 2009, the members of New York Says Thank You helped build a chapel on the location where the boys died.
