= Raglan Township, Harrison County, Iowa =

Township in Iowa, USA

Coordinates: 41°44′N 95°58′W

Raglan Township is a township in Harrison County, Iowa, United States.
