= William Haner Polygonal Barn =

- U.S. National Register of Historic Places
- Location within Iowa Location within the United States
- Location: County Road L16
- Nearest city: Pisgah, Iowa
- Coordinates: 41°49′14″N 95°49′25″W
- Area: less than one acre
- Built: 1912
- Architect: Comstock Construction
- MPS: Iowa Round Barns: The Sixty Year Experiment TR
- NRHP reference No.: 86001435
- Added to NRHP: June 30, 1986

The William Haner Polygonal Barn was a historic building located near Pisgah in rural Harrison County, Iowa, United States. It was built in 1912 by Comstock Construction. The 12-sided structure measured 54 feet (16 m) in diameter and featured white horizontal siding with a block foundation, a two-pitch roof, and a large hay dormer on the south side. It was originally used as a Purebred Hereford cattle barn. The barn was listed on the National Register of Historic Places in 1986. It was destroyed in a fire caused by lightning in 2002.
