= Douglas Township, Harrison County, Iowa =

Township in Iowa, USA

Coordinates: 41°44′N 95°37′W

Douglas Township is a township in Harrison County, Iowa, United States.
