= Rockford Township, Pottawattamie County, Iowa =

Township in Pottawattamie County, Iowa

Coordinates: 41.47°N 95.91°W

Rockford Township is a township in Pottawattamie County, Iowa, United States.

== Etymology ==
Rockford Township is named for a rock-bottomed ford in the Boyer River.
