= Orson, Iowa =

- Unincorporated community
- Location within Iowa
- Coordinates: 41°46′46″N 95°59′00″W
- Country: United States
- State: Iowa
- County: Harrison
- Elevation: 1,053 ft (321 m)
- Time zone: UTC-6 (Central (CST))
  - Summer (DST): UTC-5 (CDT)
- Area code: 712
- GNIS feature ID: 464685

Orson is an unincorporated community in Harrison County, in the U.S. state of Iowa.

== History ==
Orson was laid out in 1899 when the railroad was extended to that point. The community was named for Orson Pratt Edmonds. A post office was established at Orson in 1900, and remained in operation until it was discontinued in 1957.

Orson's population in 1925 was 35. The population was also 35 in 1940.
