= Old Harrison County Courthouse (Iowa) =

- U.S. National Register of Historic Places
- Location within Iowa Location within the United States
- Location: 410 Locust St. Magnolia, Iowa
- Coordinates: 41°41′38.7″N 95°52′16.9″W
- Area: less than one acre
- Built: 1873
- MPS: County Courthouses in Iowa TR
- NRHP reference No.: 83000365
- Added to NRHP: February 24, 1983

The Old Harrison County Courthouse, located in Magnolia, Iowa, United States, was built in 1873. It was listed on the National Register of Historic Places in 1983 as a part of the County Courthouses in Iowa Thematic Resource. The courthouse is the third building the county has used for court functions and county administration.

== History ==
Magnolia was chosen as Harrison County's first county seat. A log cabin served as the first courthouse. It was destroyed in a fire along with the county records. A second courthouse was built in 1854. The county raised the funds for its construction by selling town lots. The building was condemned as unsafe in 1873, and the county's third courthouse was built the same year. It served the county for three years until Logan was named the county seat in 1876. After its use as a courthouse it was used as a Methodist Episcopal church until at least 1938. Its significance is derived from being one of the few former courthouses extant in the state, and its association with county government and the political power and prestige of Magnolia as the county seat. It is also representative of the many county seat battles that Iowa counties engaged in.

== Architecture ==
The generally rectangular structure is faced with brick laid in a common bond. A small porch extends from the center of the main facade. It features projecting pilasters that frame a doorway that has been narrowed. The window sills are stone. The building is capped with a hip roof.

== See also ==
- Harrison County Courthouse (Logan, Iowa), also NRHP-listed
