= Washington Township, Harrison County, Iowa =

Township in Iowa, USA

Coordinates: 41°33′N 95°33′W

Washington Township is a township in Harrison County, Iowa, United States.
