= Murray General Merchandise Store =

- U.S. National Register of Historic Places
- Location within Iowa Location within the United States
- Location: Junction of Mulberry and 2nd Sts. Little Sioux, Iowa
- Coordinates: 41°48′34.2″N 96°01′28.5″W
- Area: less than one acre
- Built: 1877
- Architect: Italianate
- NRHP reference No.: 98000930
- Added to NRHP: July 31, 1998

The Murray General Merchandise Store, also known as Murray Hall, is a historic building located in Little Sioux, Iowa, United States. A native Scot, Michael Murray operated a general store from this location from 1877, when it was built, to 1916 when he died. The second floor housed the local chapters of the Masons, Independent Order of Odd Fellows, Order of the Eastern Star, Grand Army of the Republic, and the Woodmen. By the 1970s the Masons and the Eastern Star were the only two remaining, but they folded in the 1980s. The Harrison County Historic Preservation Commission took possession of the building in the 1990s to preserve it. Since then it has served a community social hall, and served as city hall briefly in 1996 when the old city hall was destroyed in a fire.

This building is a rare two-story, false-front type of commercial building remaining in Iowa. They were the type of building that was constructed in the early years of frontier towns. Most have been replaced by masonry buildings over the years because of fire or prosperity. At the time of its nomination it was one of five frame commercial buildings that remained in Little Sioux. This one has a bracketed cornice overhang that reflects the Italianate style. It is a replica of the original that was removed in the mid 20th-century. The building was listed on the National Register of Historic Places in 1998.
