= La Grange Township, Harrison County, Iowa =

Township in Iowa, USA

Coordinates: 41°33′N 95°47′W

La Grange Township is a township in Harrison County, Iowa, United States.
