= Michigan Avenue Historic Commercial District =

- U.S. National Register of Historic Places
- U.S. Historic district
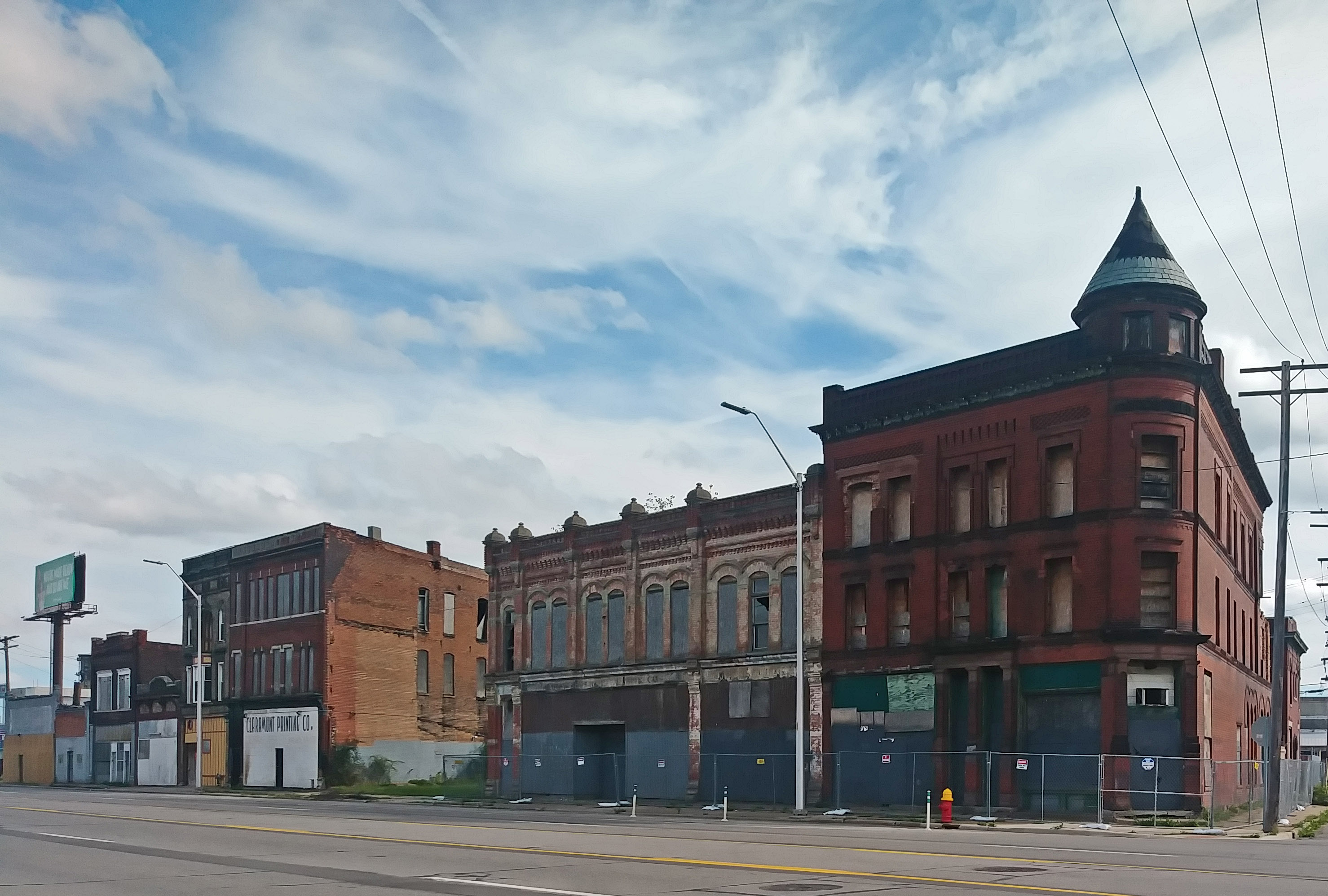
- 3300 block of Michigan
- Interactive map
- Location: South side of 3301-3461 Michigan Ave. Detroit, Michigan
- Coordinates: 42°19′53″N 83°5′24″W
- Built: 1884
- Architect: Peter Dederichs Jr., Joseph E. Mills, others
- Architectural style: Italianate, Commercial Style
- NRHP reference No.: 100005169
- Added to NRHP: April 8, 2020

The Michigan Avenue Historic Commercial District in Detroit is a group of commercial buildings located along the south side of two blocks of Michigan Avenue, from 3301 to 3461. This section of buildings is the most intact collection along this stretch of Detroit's Michigan Avenue. The district was listed on the National Register of Historic Places in 2020.

== History ==
During the mid-19th century, Detroit became home to numerous German immigrants. They initially settled on the east side of the city, along Gratiot near the central business district. However, as the city grew and pushed its boundaries westward, the German community established a neighborhood on the city's west side, beyond Corktown. The commercial heart of the German neighborhood was along Michigan Avenue from 22nd to 24th Street. By 1887, this section was built up with primarily brick commercial buildings. The businesses represented included a wood and coal business, a carriage and wagon shop, a shoe store, saloon, butcher, and grocer. A number of new buildings were constructed in the district around this time, including the 1887 Reeber Building and the 1889 Schulte and Kaiser Building. By 1897, the commercial district extended along both sides of Michigan Avenue, with buildings occupying all lots available. However, the buildings on the northern side have been largely demolished, leaving only the section on the southern side.

By 1900, the rise of Detroit manufacturing had made the area around the district substantially industrial, and the residential neighborhoods attractive to factory workers. The commercial section along Michigan Avenue flourished, with all kinds of businesses represented. As the automobile became more common, the section of industrial plants became concentrated in larger operations. By 1929, the district was still a flourishing commercial areal, housing a grocer, jeweler, movie house, candy store, bank, interior decorator, and furniture store.

However, by 1940, the Great Depression had taken its toll, and there were an increased number of vacancies. A project in the mid-1930s to widen Michigan Avenue had also resulted in the loss of some buildings, particularly some of the stock opposite the current district on the north side of Michigan. By 1950, many of the local automotive factories had moved to larger, more modern plants, and the surrounding neighborhood was in decline. Additionally, the architecture seen in the commercial district was out of style, and newer buildings were constructed to be more modern. A city planning project demolished many of the houses south of Michigan Avenue to make room for more industry, and the area became less desirable to live in. Businesses along the section of Michigan Avenue dwindled, and by the late 1960s many of the buildings were vacant.

== Description ==
The two-block section of Michigan Avenue defining the district contains 18 buildings, 13 of which are historically significant. These are all commercial structures, ranging from one to three stories, and were constructed primarily between 1884 and 1925. The buildings represent typical late 19th century and early 20th century commercial styles, in particular Italianate and Commercial Style. Several of the buildings have been modernized with alterations to their facades.

The buildings included in the district are:

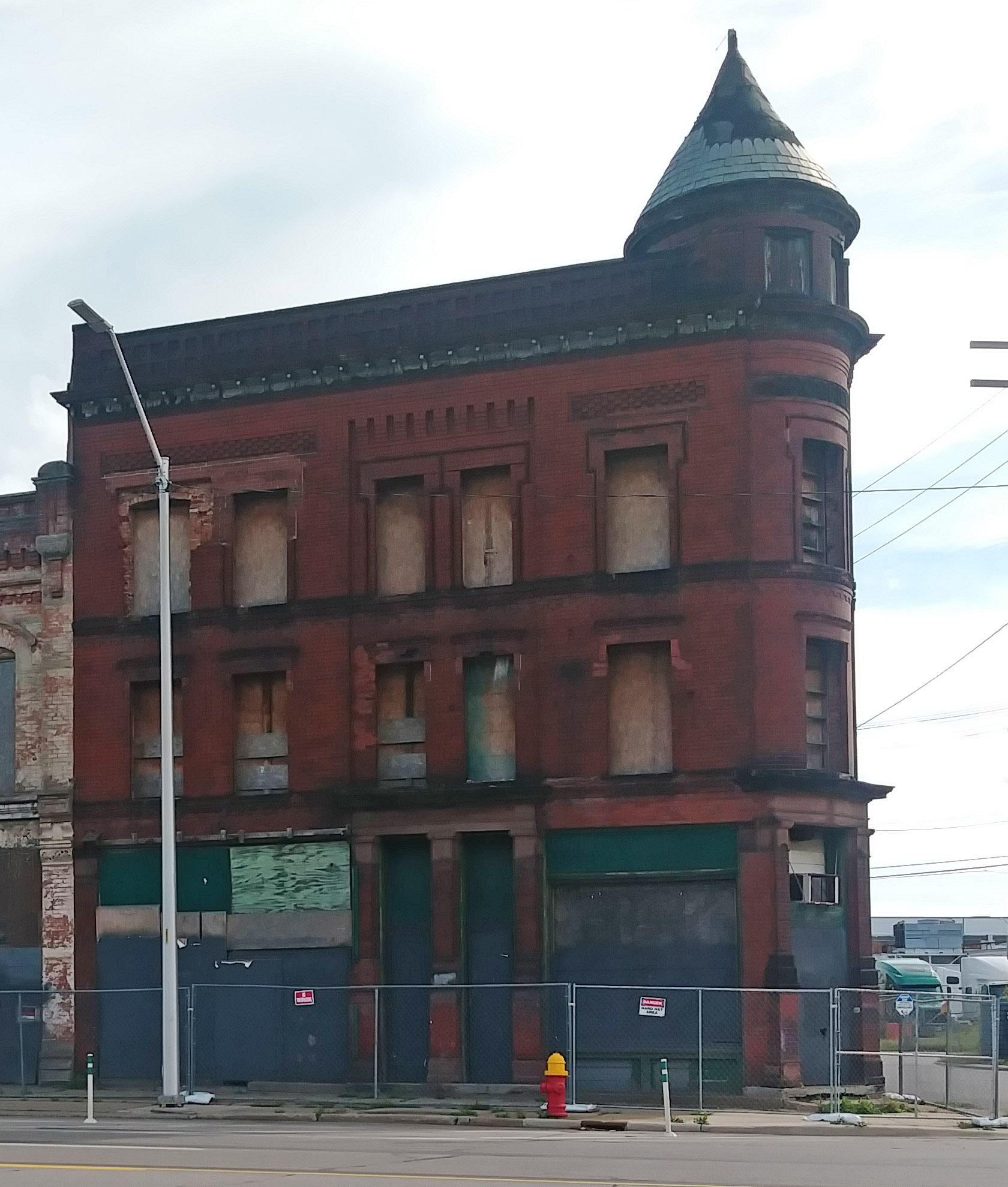
Grosfield Building

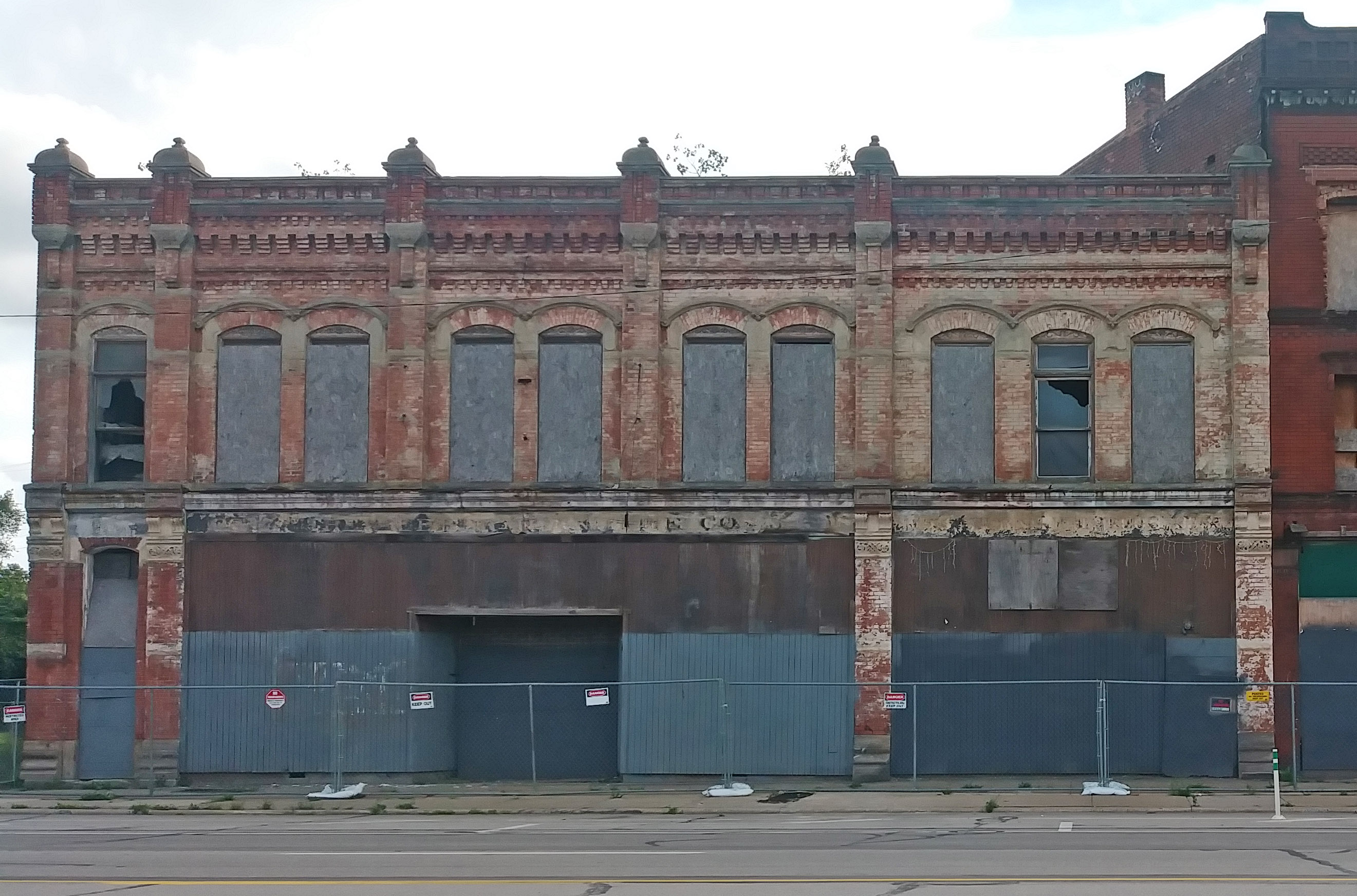
Reeber Building

- Wolverine Theater (3301 Michigan Avenue): constructed c. 1918. A one-story brick building with a large parapet originally used for signage. The facade is covered with vertical wood siding.
- 3311 Michigan Avenue: constructed c. 1922. A one-story brick building with a flat roof. The front has brick column detailing and a stone cap.
- 3315-3317 Michigan Avenue: constructed c. 1898. A two-story brick building with a flat roof. The two street numbers are assigned to a primary entry in the center of the façade, and a slightly narrower secondary entry close to one end which leads up to the second-floor apartments. A storefront cornice is topped by a stone sill that united the second-story windows. The building cornice has decorative brickwork in a scallop pattern.
- 3321 Michigan Avenue: constructed c. 1910. A one-story yellow brick building with a flat roof. The storefront is framed by brick pilasters and sets of paired metal brackets support a metal cornice.
- 3325 Michigan Avenue: constructed c. 1896. A three-story yellow brick building with a flat roof. The second and third stories are unified by a large round arch with decorative keystone, recessed about two feet, placed in the center of the building. The arch is filled with a projecting bay window on the second floor and a door on the third. The arch is flanked by window openings on both levels; the third floor windows are arched.
- 3333 Michigan Avenue: constructed c. 1900. A three-story brick red building with a flat roof. It is divided into two bays: a thin one on one end with an entry door and single windows above, and the main bay with a storefront ad three sets of paired windows above.
- Reeber Furniture Company Building (3363 Michigan Avenue): constructed 1887 and designed by Peter Dederichs Jr. and Joseph E. Mills. A seventy-foot long two-story building constructed of brick. The façade is divided into three asymmetrical bays by brick pilasters with stone capitals and decorative stone accents at the base. The window openings on the second floor have arched stone moldings with a small scroll design. A cornice with corbeled brickwork runs along the roofline.
- Grosfield Building (3365 Michigan Avenue): constructed 1893 and designed by Joseph E. Mills. A three-story brick building with a flat roof. The most architecturally distinctive building in the district, this structure contains several Queen Anne details, including textured stone trim, patterned brickwork, terra cotta insets, semi-circular arched openings and a cylindrical tower with conical roof. Stone belt courses run between the stories.
- People's State Bank (3401 Michigan Avenue): constructed 1925. A one-story building with a flat roof, faced with limestone. The building has three bays along Michigan and eight bays along the side street. The primary entrance is through a recessed portico flanked by Ionic columns. The front door is framed with a pediment.
- 3415 Michigan Avenue: constructed c. 1884. A two-story brick building with a flat roof. This building was constructed as a unified triple building, along with 3419 and 3423 Michigan. It is divided into four bays.
- 3419 Michigan Avenue: constructed c. 1884. A two-story brick building with a flat roof. This building was constructed as a unified triple building, along with 3415 and 3423 Michigan. The ground floor has evidence of arched window treatments, not shared with the other two buildings. It is divided into four bays.
- 3423 Michigan Avenue: constructed c. 1884. A two-story brick building with a flat roof. This building was constructed as a unified triple building, along with 3415 and 3419 Michigan.
- Schulte and Kaiser Grocery Building (3461 Michigan Avenue): constructed c. 1889 and designed by Peter Dederichs Jr. A two-story brick building with a flat roof and projecting parapet. It is divided into eight bays and two storefronts; the storefronts are currently filled in. A corner entry is located at one end. The storefronts and corner entry are set off by decorative brick pilaster with decorative stone treatment.
