= Boyer Township, Harrison County, Iowa =

Township in Iowa, USA

Coordinates: 41.7328°N 95.7277°W

Boyer Township is a township in Harrison County, Iowa, United States.
