= Modale School and Masonic Hall =

- U.S. National Register of Historic Places
- Location within Iowa Location within the United States
- Location: 107 S. Main St. Modale, Iowa
- Coordinates: 41°37′08.5″N 96°0′44.2″W
- Area: less than one acre
- Built: 1880
- NRHP reference No.: 13001136
- Added to NRHP: February 5, 2014

Modale School and Masonic Hall is a historic building located in Modale, Iowa, United States. Built in 1880, the two-story frame vernacular form structure served as the community's school building. In general, 19th century school buildings resembled churches, and the Modale School was no different. The rectangular, front gabled building originally had a prominent bell tower that projected from the main facade. In 1911 the local Masonic lodge converted the building into a theater on the main floor and their lodge hall on the second floor. At that time they added a rear addition, Colonial Revival details on the main facade and on the porches, and Masonic symbols on the front gable end. The Modale lodge dissolved their membership in 2004 and merged with the lodge in Missouri Valley, Iowa as both had lost membership over the years. They donated the building to Town and Country Arts. It was listed on the National Register of Historic Places in 2014.
