= Harrison County Courthouse (Iowa) =

- U.S. National Register of Historic Places
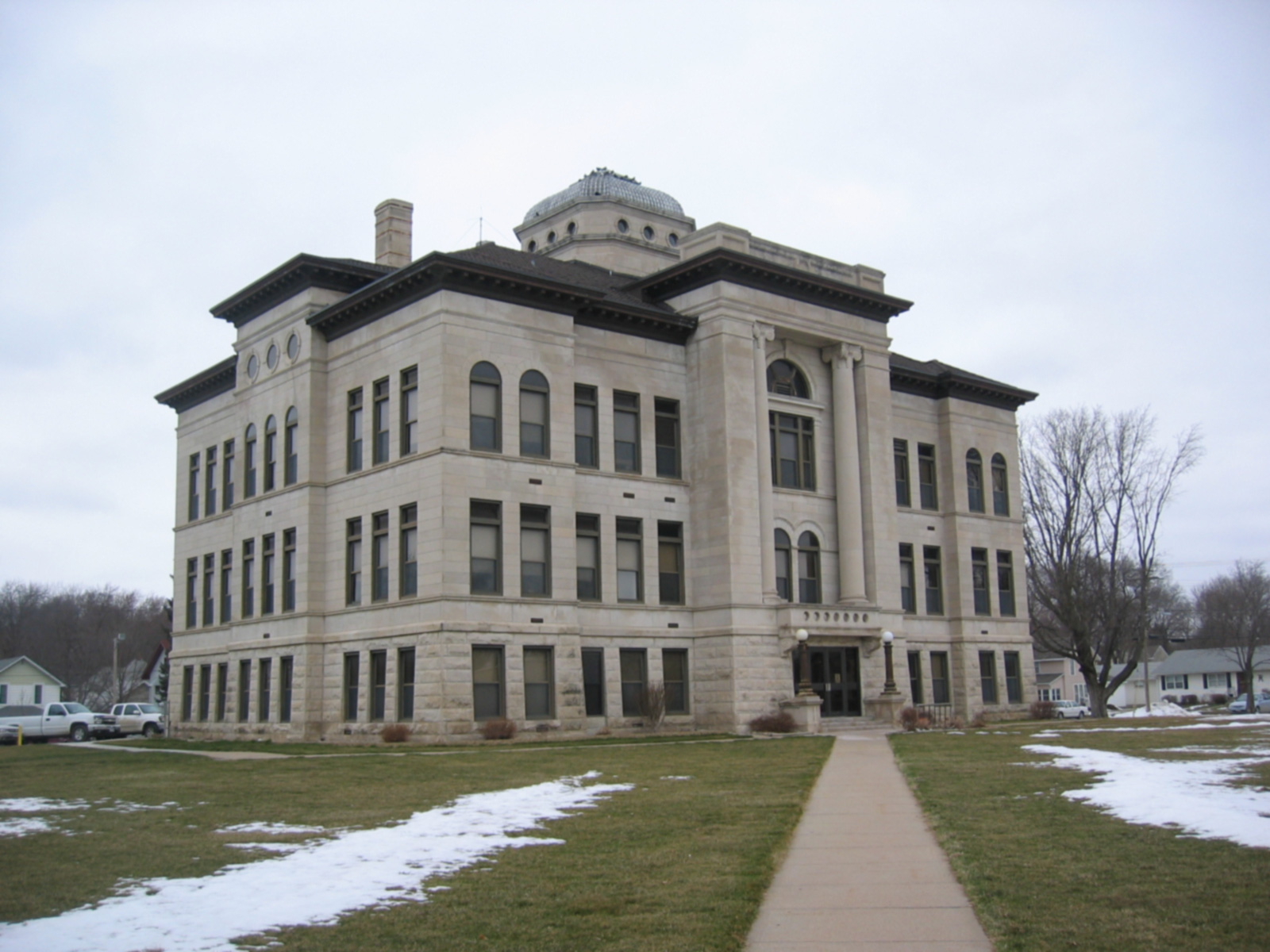

- Location within Iowa Location within the United States
- Interactive map showing the location for Harrison County Courthouse
- Location: 7th St. Logan, Iowa
- Coordinates: 41°38′37″N 95°47′23″W
- Area: less than one acre
- Built: 1911
- Built by: Yeisley & Stowell
- Architect: Joseph E. Mills
- Architectural style: Classical Revival
- MPS: County Courthouses in Iowa TR
- NRHP reference No.: 81000243
- Added to NRHP: July 2, 1981

The Harrison County Courthouse, located in Logan, Iowa, United States, was built in 1911. It was listed on the National Register of Historic Places in 1981 as a part of the County Courthouses in Iowa Thematic Resource. The courthouse is the fifth building the county has used for court functions and county administration.

== History ==
The first county seat in Harrison County was Magnolia. A log cabin served as the first courthouse. It was destroyed in a fire along with the county records. A second courthouse was built in 1854. The county raised the funds for its construction by selling town lots. The building was condemned as unsafe in 1873, and the county's third courthouse was built the same year. It served the county for three years until Logan was named the county seat.

The first courthouse in Logan was built in 1876 for $14,000. An appropriation of $5,000 came from the county and $9,000 was donated from the people of Logan. Yeisley & Stowell were the contractors that built the building. The two-story brick structure measure 55 by 70 feet (17 by 21 m). Offices for the county Auditor, Treasurer, Clerk, Recorder, Sheriff, and School Superintendent were on the first floor. The second floor contained the courtroom and jury rooms.

Plans for the present courthouse were begun in 1905. The cornerstone was laid on October 5, 1910, and it was dedicated on November 3, 1911. It was built at a cost of $103,205.15.

== Architecture ==
The Neoclassical building was designed by Detroit architect Joseph E. Mills. The three-story building measures 68 by 96 feet (21 by 29 m). The top of the dome is 77 feet (23 m) above the street. It is constructed in steel and concrete block and faced in Bedford stone. The east and west elevations each have three projecting pavilions. The central pavilion on each side is more ornate with its tall round-arch window set between Ionic columns in antis. The building is capped with a hipped roof supported by a modillion cornice. The low cupula on top features cut corners, three oculus windows on each face, and a curved tile roof.

Its exterior is relatively simple when compared with its richly-appointed interior public spaces. It has a lozenge-shaped rotunda, richly-patterned tile floors, and a metal staircase. The rotunda is separated from the halls by column screens. Four murals were placed in the main stairway during a redecorating program in 1920. They are the work of Frank Enders of Milwaukee. They were all done on canvas that was attached to the wall. The murals portray the old courthouse in Magnolia, the first courthouse in Logan, a horn of plenty theme, and Lady Justice. The significance of the courthouse is derived from its association with county government, and the political power and prestige of Logan as the county seat.

== See also ==
- Old Harrison County Courthouse (Iowa), Magnolia, which is also listed on the National Register of Historic Places
