= Iowa Natural Heritage Foundation =

Natural conservation organization

- Founded at: Des Moines, Iowa
- Purpose: Natural conservation
- Website: https://www.inhf.org/

The Iowa Natural Heritage Foundation (INHF) is a statewide non-profit natural conservation organization based in Des Moines, Iowa with a mission to protect and restore Iowa's land, water and wildlife. The organization has protected more than 190,000 acres (770 km^{2}) in 97 of Iowa's 99 counties and worked on hundreds of different project sites since its inception in 1979. INHF is donor-supported and has a membership of roughly 10,000. The current president of INHF is Joe McGovern.

== Projects ==
INHF works with partner organizations to preserve and protect natural landscapes throughout the state. Landowners interested in protecting their land either donate or sell property to INHF, who will work to conserve and/or restore its natural features.

In most cases, INHF takes ownership of land temporarily, while public conservation agencies (local, county, state or federal) raise funds to purchase the property. During this time, INHF will lend technical and professional assistance to these agencies, as well as work to restore native ecosystems.
INHF works directly with landowners to make sure that the transaction meets their wishes. INHF staff will meet with landowners to negotiate the sale or donation of their land, as well as the transfer to whatever agency will retain permanent ownership.
In most cases, project sites that INHF assists with will become public land, open for exploration, hunting, fishing, camping and other activities, depending on the site. INHF also works with landowners to protect their land through conservation easements, in which a landowner relinquishes certain rights to all or part of his or her property (e.g. farming or mining), while still retaining ownership. INHF and the private owners develop a legally binding agreement regarding which property uses will be allowed or restricted. This agreement applies to the current owner and all future owners.
