= Magnolia, Iowa =

- City
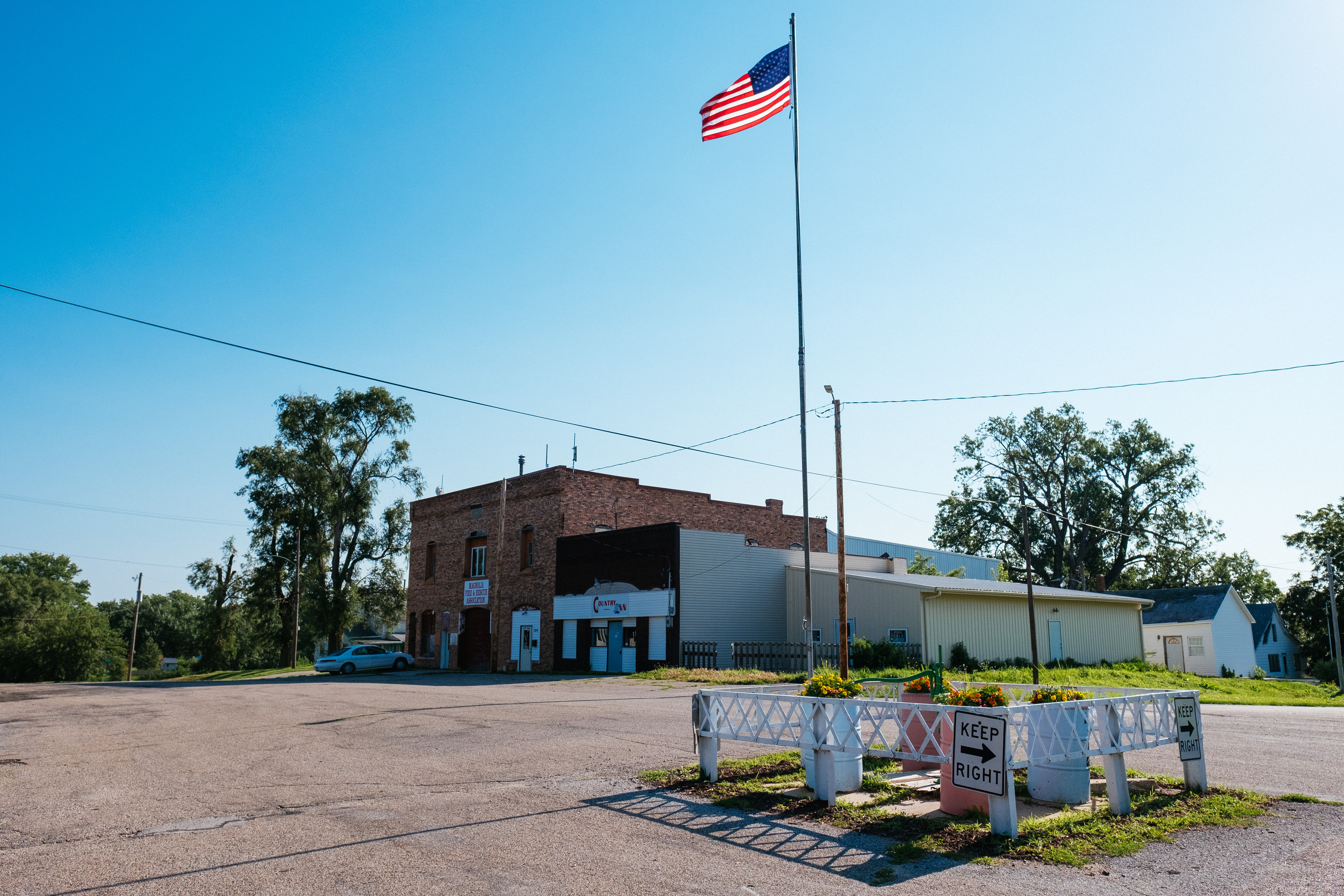
- Magnolia Town Center

- Location of Magnolia, Iowa

- Location within Iowa Location within the United States
- Coordinates: 41°41′34″N 95°52′33″W
- Country: USA
- State: Iowa
- County: Harrison
- Township: Magnolia

Area
  - Total: 0.55 sq mi (1.42 km^{2})
  - Land: 0.55 sq mi (1.42 km^{2})
  - Water: 0 sq mi (0.00 km^{2})
- Elevation: 1,276 ft (389 m)

Population (2020)
  - Total: 190
  - Density: 346.7/sq mi (133.88/km^{2})
- Time zone: UTC-6 (Central (CST))
  - Summer (DST): UTC-5 (CDT)
- ZIP code: 51550
- Area code: 712
- FIPS code: 19-48495
- GNIS feature ID: 2395814

Magnolia is a city in Harrison County, Iowa, United States. The population was 190 at the time of the 2020 census.

== History ==
Harrison County was established in 1851 and organized on March 7, 1853. Abram Fletcher, Charles Wolcott and A. D. Jones were appointed by the Iowa General Assembly as Commissioners to organize the county and establish a county seat. They chose the location for Magnolia and gave it its name. The third building that was erected in the town for the county courthouse in 1873 was listed on the National Register of Historic Places. The building was demolished in 2019 due to extreme disrepair and the lack of funds to maintain it.

The county seat was transferred to Logan from Magnolia in 1875.

== Geography ==
According to the United States Census Bureau, the city has a total area of 0.57 square miles (1.48 km^{2}), all of it land.

== Demographics ==
Historical populations
| Year | Pop. | ±% |
|---|---|---|
| 1880 | 194 | — |
| 1890 | 217 | +11.9% |
| 1900 | 266 | +22.6% |
| 1910 | 311 | +16.9% |
| 1920 | 299 | −3.9% |
| 1930 | 271 | −9.4% |
| 1940 | 242 | −10.7% |
| 1950 | 207 | −14.5% |
| 1960 | 215 | +3.9% |
| 1970 | 206 | −4.2% |
| 1980 | 207 | +0.5% |
| 1990 | 204 | −1.4% |
| 2000 | 200 | −2.0% |
| 2010 | 183 | −8.5% |
| 2020 | 190 | +3.8% |
Source:"U.S. Census website". United States Census Bureau. and Iowa Data Center; Source: U.S. Decennial Census

=== 2020 census ===
As of the census of 2020, there were 190 people, 76 households, and 54 families residing in the city. The population density was 346.7 inhabitants per square mile (133.9/km^{2}). There were 84 housing units at an average density of 153.3 per square mile (59.2/km^{2}). The racial makeup of the city was 89.5% White, 0.0% Black or African American, 0.0% Native American, 0.0% Asian, 0.0% Pacific Islander, 2.1% from other races and 8.4% from two or more races. Hispanic or Latino persons of any race comprised 1.6% of the population.

Of the 76 households, 32.9% of which had children under the age of 18 living with them, 52.6% were married couples living together, 10.5% were cohabitating couples, 23.7% had a female householder with no spouse or partner present and 13.2% had a male householder with no spouse or partner present. 28.9% of all households were non-families. 26.3% of all households were made up of individuals, 21.1% had someone living alone who was 65 years old or older.

The median age in the city was 43.8 years. 26.3% of the residents were under the age of 20; 2.6% were between the ages of 20 and 24; 22.6% were from 25 and 44; 24.7% were from 45 and 64; and 23.7% were 65 years of age or older. The gender makeup of the city was 49.5% male and 50.5% female.

=== 2010 census ===
As of the census of 2010, there were 183 people, 79 households, and 50 families living in the city. The population density was 321.1 inhabitants per square mile (124.0/km^{2}). There were 87 housing units at an average density of 152.6 per square mile (58.9/km^{2}). The racial makeup of the city was 100.0% White.

There were 79 households, of which 22.8% had children under the age of 18 living with them, 51.9% were married couples living together, 7.6% had a female householder with no husband present, 3.8% had a male householder with no wife present, and 36.7% were non-families. 29.1% of all households were made up of individuals, and 15.2% had someone living alone who was 65 years of age or older. The average household size was 2.32 and the average family size was 2.86.

The median age in the city was 47.7 years. 15.3% of residents were under the age of 18; 7.1% were between the ages of 18 and 24; 22.5% were from 25 to 44; 39.8% were from 45 to 64; and 15.3% were 65 years of age or older. The gender makeup of the city was 55.7% male and 44.3% female.

=== 2000 census ===
As of the census of 2000, there were 200 people, 85 households, and 57 families living in the city. The population density was 343.2 inhabitants per square mile (132.5/km^{2}). There were 96 housing units at an average density of 164.8 per square mile (63.6/km^{2}). The racial makeup of the city was 97.50% White, 0.50% Native American, 0.50% from other races, and 1.50% from two or more races. Hispanic or Latino of any race were 0.50% of the population.

There were 85 households, out of which 25.9% had children under the age of 18 living with them, 61.2% were married couples living together, 5.9% had a female householder with no husband present, and 31.8% were non-families. 30.6% of all households were made up of individuals, and 16.5% had someone living alone who was 65 years of age or older. The average household size was 2.35 and the average family size was 2.93.

In the city, the population was spread out, with 24.5% under the age of 18, 6.0% from 18 to 24, 24.5% from 25 to 44, 27.5% from 45 to 64, and 17.5% who were 65 years of age or older. The median age was 42 years. For every 100 females, there were 122.2 males. For every 100 females age 18 and over, there were 109.7 males.

The median income for a household in the city was $30,625, and the median income for a family was $40,000. Males had a median income of $31,250 versus $30,833 for females. The per capita income for the city was $16,533. About 8.9% of families and 11.0% of the population were below the poverty line, including 26.8% of those under the age of eighteen and none of those 65 or over.

== Education ==
Logan–Magnolia Community School District operates local public schools.
