= Magnolia Township, Harrison County, Iowa =

Township in Iowa, USA

Coordinates: 41°44′N 95°51′W

Magnolia Township is a township in Harrison County, Iowa, United States.
