= Yorkshire Cup =

Yorkshire Cup may refer to:

- Yorkshire Cup (rugby union) ("T’owd tin pot"), a rugby union competition for Yorkshire clubs
- Yorkshire Cup (horse race), a horse race held at York Racecourse
- RFL Yorkshire Cup, a rugby league competition for Yorkshire clubs
- BARLA Yorkshire Cup, a rugby league competition for amateur teams in Yorkshire
