= Persia, Iowa =

- City
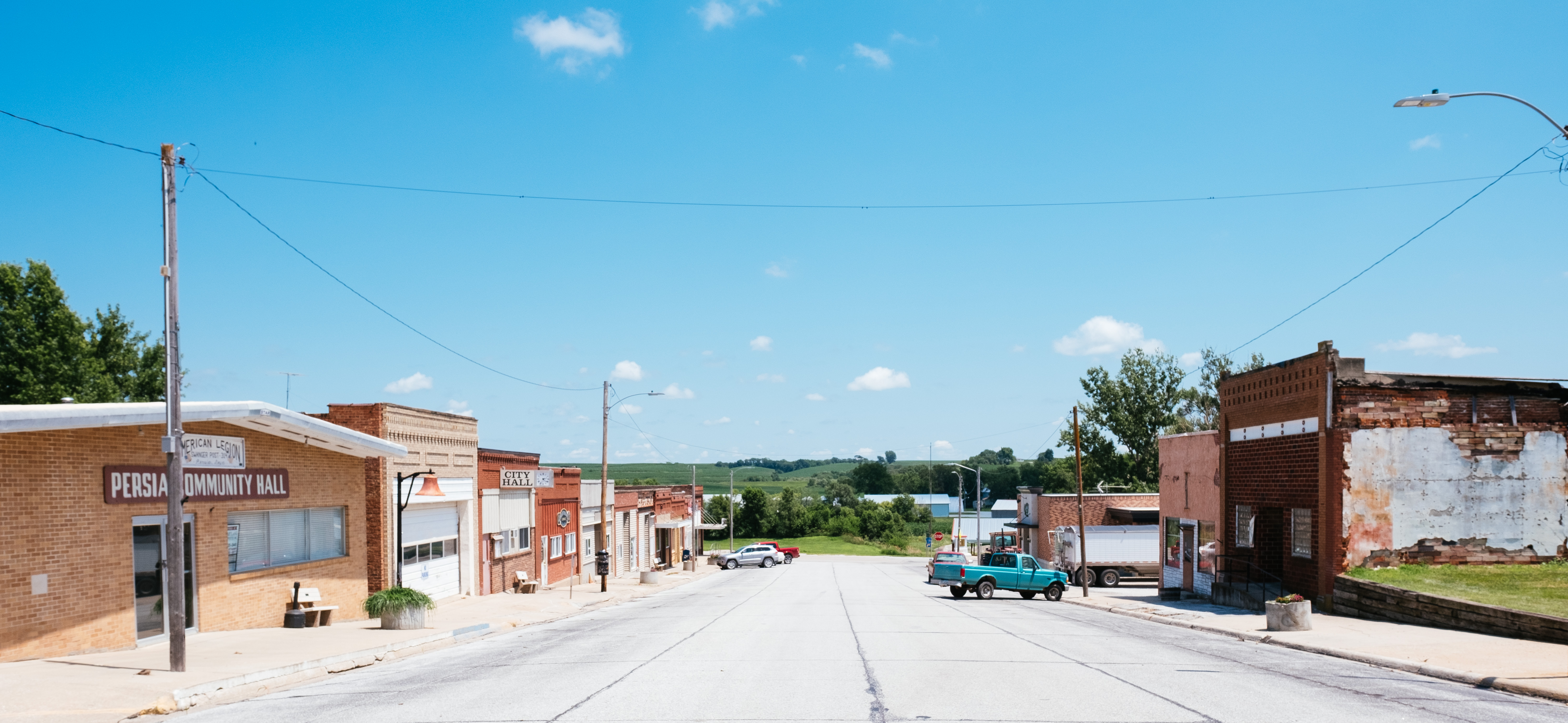

- Location of Persia, Iowa
- Coordinates: 41°34′43″N 95°34′12″W
- Country: USA
- State: Iowa
- County: Harrison

Area
  - Total: 0.50 sq mi (1.30 km^{2})
  - Land: 0.50 sq mi (1.30 km^{2})
  - Water: 0 sq mi (0.00 km^{2})
- Elevation: 1,201 ft (366 m)

Population (2020)
  - Total: 297
  - Density: 592.4/sq mi (228.74/km^{2})
- Time zone: UTC-6 (Central (CST))
  - Summer (DST): UTC-5 (CDT)
- ZIP code: 51563
- Area code: 712
- FIPS code: 19-62445
- GNIS feature ID: 2396187

Persia is a city in Harrison County, Iowa, United States. The population was 297 in the 2020 census, a decline from 363 in the 2000 census.

== Geography ==
According to the United States Census Bureau, the city has a total area of 0.47 square miles (1.22 km^{2}), all of it land.

== Demographics ==
Historical population
Census	Pop.	Note	%±
1900	361		—
1910	358		−0.8%
1920	380		6.1%
1930	396		4.2%
1940	395		−0.3%
1950	373		−5.6%
1960	322		−13.7%
1970	316		−1.9%
1980	355		12.3%
1990	312		−12.1%
2000	363		16.3%
2010	319		−12.1%
2020	297		−6.9%
U.S. Decennial Census

=== 2020 census ===
As of the census of 2020, there were 297 people, 111 households, and 81 families residing in the city. The population density was 592.4 inhabitants per square mile (228.7/km^{2}). There were 119 housing units at an average density of 237.4 per square mile (91.6/km^{2}). The racial makeup of the city was 96.6% White, 0.0% Black or African American, 0.0% Native American, 0.7% Asian, 0.0% Pacific Islander, 0.0% from other races and 2.7% from two or more races. Hispanic or Latino persons of any race comprised 2.7% of the population.

Of the 111 households, 36.9% of which had children under the age of 18 living with them, 55.0% were married couples living together, 4.5% were cohabitating couples, 17.1% had a female householder with no spouse or partner present and 23.4% had a male householder with no spouse or partner present. 27.0% of all households were non-families. 19.8% of all households were made up of individuals, 5.4% had someone living alone who was 65 years old or older.

The median age in the city was 34.5 years. 33.7% of the residents were under the age of 20; 4.4% were between the ages of 20 and 24; 27.3% were from 25 and 44; 19.2% were from 45 and 64; and 15.5% were 65 years of age or older. The gender makeup of the city was 51.5% male and 48.5% female.

=== 2010 census ===
As of the census of 2010, there were 319 people, 127 households, and 88 families living in the city. The population density was 678.7 inhabitants per square mile (262.0/km^{2}). There were 137 housing units at an average density of 291.5 per square mile (112.5/km^{2}). The racial makeup of the city was 97.8% White, 0.3% African American, and 1.9% Native American. Hispanic or Latino of any race were 0.3% of the population.

There were 127 households, of which 35.4% had children under the age of 18 living with them, 54.3% were married couples living together, 11.8% had a female householder with no husband present, 3.1% had a male householder with no wife present, and 30.7% were non-families. 26.0% of all households were made up of individuals, and 10.3% had someone living alone who was 65 years of age or older. The average household size was 2.51 and the average family size was 3.03.

The median age in the city was 36.1 years. 27.6% of residents were under the age of 18; 7.6% were between the ages of 18 and 24; 26.9% were from 25 to 44; 22.5% were from 45 to 64; and 15.4% were 65 years of age or older. The gender makeup of the city was 48.6% male and 51.4% female.

=== 2000 census ===
As of the census of 2000, there were 363 people, 141 households, and 104 families living in the city. The population density was 794.9 inhabitants per square mile (306.9/km^{2}). There were 145 housing units at an average density of 317.5 per square mile (122.6/km^{2}). The racial makeup of the city was 99.45% White, 0.28% African American, and 0.28% from two or more races. Hispanic or Latino of any race were 0.55% of the population.

There were 141 households, out of which 31.9% had children under the age of 18 living with them, 61.0% were married couples living together, 6.4% had a female householder with no husband present, and 26.2% were non-families. 23.4% of all households were made up of individuals, and 15.6% had someone living alone who was 65 years of age or older. The average household size was 2.57 and the average family size was 2.97.

Age spread: 26.2% under the age of 18, 8.8% from 18 to 24, 27.5% from 25 to 44, 19.6% from 45 to 64, and 17.9% who were 65 years of age or older. The median age was 36 years. For every 100 females, there were 92.1 males. For every 100 females age 18 and over, there were 91.4 males.

The median income for a household in the city was $36,563, and the median income for a family was $40,000. Males had a median income of $26,000 versus $22,500 for females. The per capita income for the city was $14,859. About 8.3% of families and 10.0% of the population were below the poverty line, including 13.6% of those under age 18 and 13.1% of those age 65 or over.

=== In the media ===
In September 2012, BBC Persian channel broadcast a short coverage of the city of Persia. This coverage was about the city itself and why it is named Persia. The mayor and some locals were interviewed as a part of this coverage.

== Education ==
Tri-Center Community School District operates schools serving Persia. Its high school is Tri-Center High School.
