= Little Sioux Township, Harrison County, Iowa =

Township in Iowa, USA

Coordinates: 41°49′N 96°01′W

Little Sioux Township is a township in Harrison County, Iowa, United States.
