= Modale, Iowa =

- City
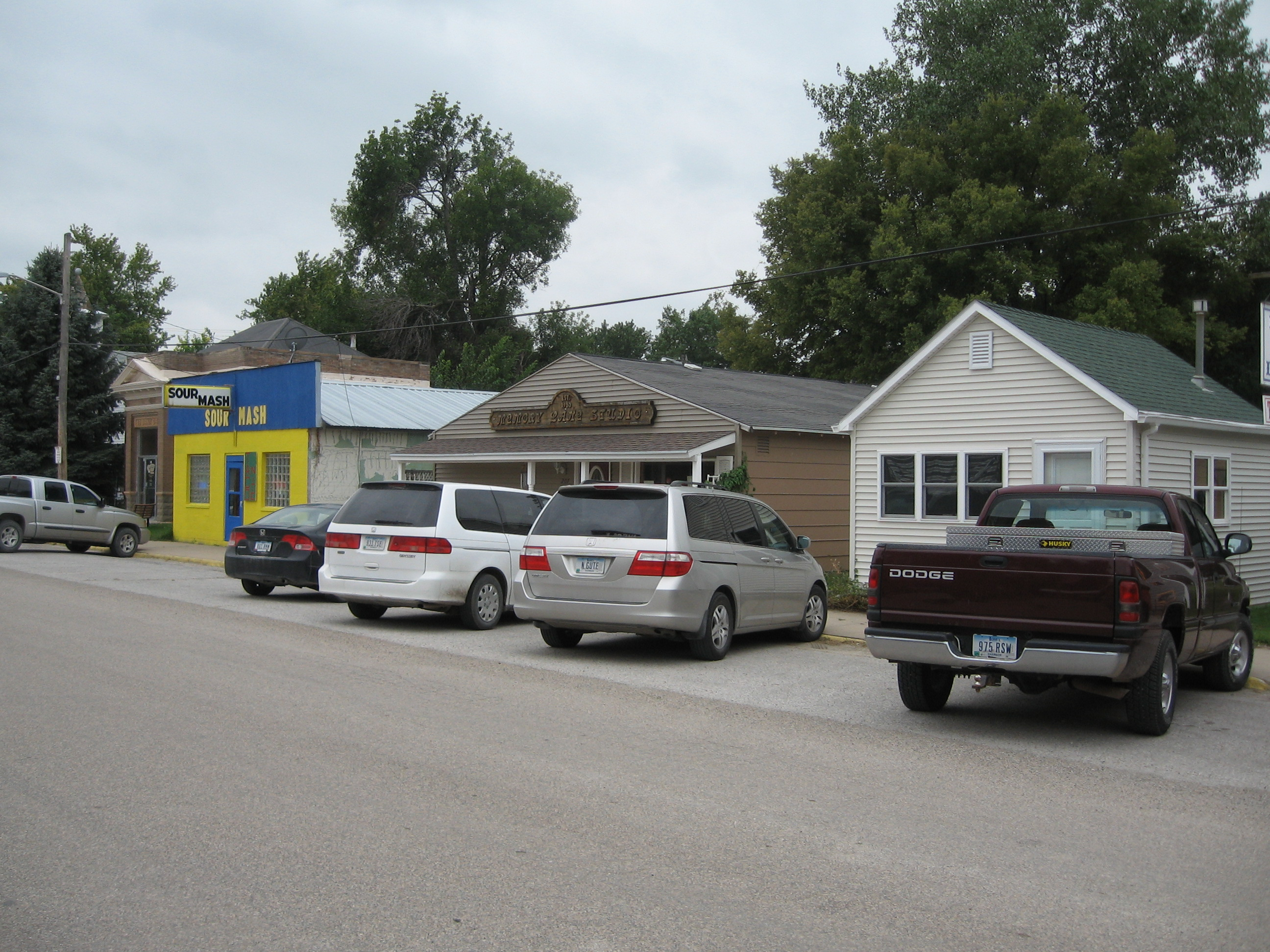
- Downtown Modale, Iowa

- Location of Modale, Iowa
- Coordinates: 41°37′18″N 96°00′44″W
- Country: USA
- State: Iowa
- County: Harrison

Area
  - Total: 1.04 sq mi (2.70 km^{2})
  - Land: 1.04 sq mi (2.70 km^{2})
  - Water: 0 sq mi (0.00 km^{2})
- Elevation: 1,014 ft (309 m)

Population (2020)
  - Total: 273
  - Density: 262.2/sq mi (101.22/km^{2})
- Time zone: UTC-6 (Central (CST))
  - Summer (DST): UTC-5 (CDT)
- ZIP code: 51556
- Area code: 712
- FIPS code: 19-52995
- GNIS feature ID: 2395363
- Website: www.modaleiowa.com

Modale is a city in Harrison County, Iowa, United States. The population was 273 at the time of the 2020 census.

== History ==
Modale was originally called Martinsdale, and under the latter name was laid out in 1872 by Benjamin Martin, and named for him. The present name of Modale, so named from the city's setting in a dale near the Missouri River, was adopted when a railroad depot was first built.

== Geography ==
According to the United States Census Bureau, the city has a total area of 1.05 square miles (2.72 km^{2}), all of it land.

== Demographics ==
Historical populations
Year	Pop.	±%
1890	288	—
1900	383	+33.0%
1910	387	+1.0%
1920	381	−1.6%
1930	359	−5.8%
1940	385	+7.2%
1950	283	−26.5%
1960	276	−2.5%
1970	297	+7.6%
1980	373	+25.6%
1990	289	−22.5%
2000	303	+4.8%
2010	283	−6.6%
2020	273	−3.5%
Source:"U.S. Census website". United States Census Bureau. and Iowa Data Center; Source: U.S. Decennial Census

=== 2020 census ===
As of the census of 2020, there were 273 people, 123 households, and 82 families residing in the city. The population density was 262.1 inhabitants per square mile (101.2/km^{2}). There were 133 housing units at an average density of 127.7 per square mile (49.3/km^{2}). The racial makeup of the city was 95.2% White, 0.4% Black or African American, 0.0% Native American, 0.4% Asian, 0.0% Pacific Islander, 0.4% from other races and 3.7% from two or more races. Hispanic or Latino persons of any race comprised 0.7% of the population.

Of the 123 households, 38.2% of which had children under the age of 18 living with them, 45.5% were married couples living together, 11.4% were cohabitating couples, 21.1% had a female householder with no spouse or partner present and 22.0% had a male householder with no spouse or partner present. 33.3% of all households were non-families. 27.6% of all households were made up of individuals, 13.0% had someone living alone who was 65 years old or older.

The median age in the city was 43.3 years. 26.0% of the residents were under the age of 20; 2.6% were between the ages of 20 and 24; 23.4% were from 25 and 44; 27.8% were from 45 and 64; and 20.1% were 65 years of age or older. The gender makeup of the city was 48.7% male and 51.3% female.

=== 2010 census ===
As of the census of 2010, there were 283 people, 116 households, and 74 families living in the city. The population density was 269.5 inhabitants per square mile (104.1/km^{2}). There were 146 housing units at an average density of 139.0 per square mile (53.7/km^{2}). The racial makeup of the city was 98.2% White, 0.7% Native American, 0.7% Asian, and 0.4% from two or more races. Hispanic or Latino of any race were 0.4% of the population.

There were 116 households, of which 30.2% had children under the age of 18 living with them, 51.7% were married couples living together, 6.0% had a female householder with no husband present, 6.0% had a male householder with no wife present, and 36.2% were non-families. 31.0% of all households were made up of individuals, and 17.3% had someone living alone who was 65 years of age or older. The average household size was 2.44 and the average family size was 3.05.

The median age in the city was 40.5 years. 25.8% of residents were under the age of 18; 5.2% were between the ages of 18 and 24; 23.6% were from 25 to 44; 29.3% were from 45 to 64; and 15.9% were 65 years of age or older. The gender makeup of the city was 48.1% male and 51.9% female.

=== 2000 census ===
As of the census of 2000, there were 303 people, 139 households, and 89 families living in the city. The population density was 280.0 inhabitants per square mile (108.1/km^{2}). There were 155 housing units at an average density of 143.3 per square mile (55.3/km^{2}). The racial makeup of the city was 95.05% White, 1.32% Native American, and 3.63% from two or more races.

There were 139 households, out of which 25.2% had children under the age of 18 living with them, 56.1% were married couples living together, 5.8% had a female householder with no husband present, and 35.3% were non-families. 34.5% of all households were made up of individuals, and 17.3% had someone living alone who was 65 years of age or older. The average household size was 2.18 and the average family size was 2.74.

Age/Gender Breakdown: 22.1% under the age of 18, 7.3% from 18 to 24, 26.4% from 25 to 44, 25.1% from 45 to 64, and 19.1% who were 65 years of age or older. The median age was 41 years. For every 100 females, there were 110.4 males. For every 100 females age 18 and over, there were 96.7 males.

The median income for a household in the city was $34,688, and the median income for a family was $39,432. Males had a median income of $30,417 versus $22,500 for females. The per capita income for the city was $19,111. About 6.7% of families and 10.0% of the population were below the poverty line, including 19.4% of those under the age of eighteen and 12.5% of those 65 or over.

== Education ==
It is within the West Harrison Community School District.

== Notable people ==
- Myra Keaton, mother of actor and director Buster Keaton, was born in Modale.
