= Neola, Iowa =

- City
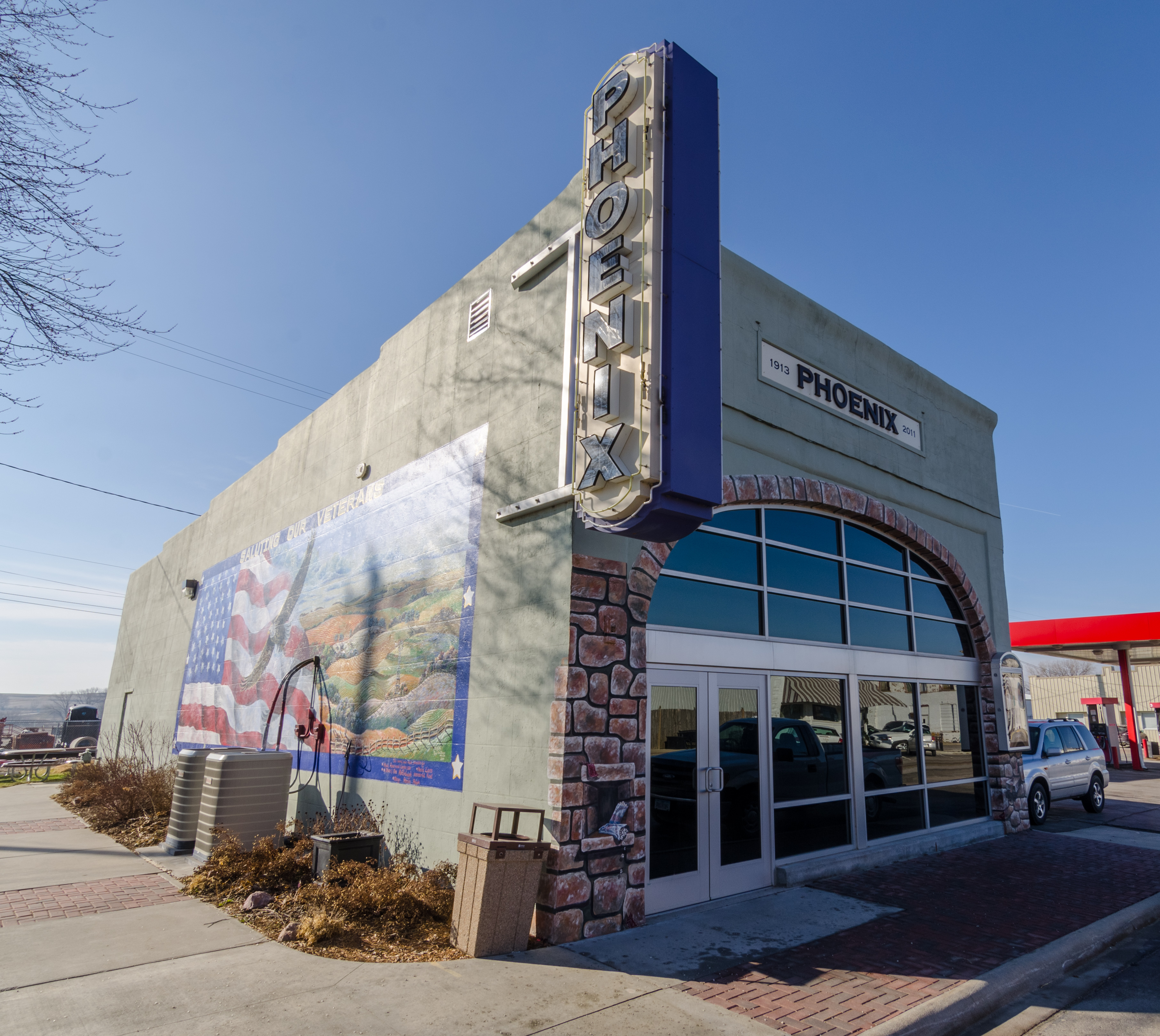
- The Historic Phoenix Theatre in Neola, Iowa

- Location of Neola, Iowa
- Coordinates: 41°27′18″N 95°37′20″W
- Country: United States
- State: Iowa
- County: Pottawattamie
- Established: 1882

Government
  - Type: Mayor-council

Area
  - Total: 0.64 sq mi (1.65 km^{2})
  - Land: 0.63 sq mi (1.64 km^{2})
  - Water: 0.0039 sq mi (0.01 km^{2})
- Elevation: 1,158 ft (353 m)

Population (2020)
  - Total: 918
  - Density: 1,448.1/sq mi (559.12/km^{2})
- Time zone: UTC-6 (Central (CST))
  - Summer (DST): UTC-5 (CDT)
- ZIP code: 51559
- Area code: 712
- FIPS code: 19-55560
- GNIS feature ID: 2395171
- Website: www.neola-iowa.com

Neola is a city in Pottawattamie County, Iowa, United States. The population was 918 at the time of the 2020 census.

== History ==
Neola got its start in the year 1869, following construction of the Chicago, Rock Island and Pacific Railroad through the territory.

== Geography ==
According to the United States Census Bureau, the city has a total area of 0.46 square miles (1.19 km^{2}), all land.

== Demographics ==
Historical populations
Year	Pop.	±%
1880	286	—
1890	917	+220.6%
1900	921	+0.4%
1910	926	+0.5%
1920	896	−3.2%
1930	944	+5.4%
1940	841	−10.9%
1950	839	−0.2%
1960	870	+3.7%
1970	968	+11.3%
1980	839	−13.3%
1990	909	+8.3%
2000	845	−7.0%
2010	842	−0.4%
2020	918	+9.0%
Source:"U.S. Census website". United States Census Bureau. and Iowa Data Center; Source: U.S. Decennial Census

=== 2020 census ===
As of the census of 2020, there were 918 people, 363 households, and 240 families residing in the city. The population density was 1,448.1 inhabitants per square mile (559.1/km^{2}). There were 375 housing units at an average density of 591.6 per square mile (228.4/km^{2}). The racial makeup of the city was 94.1% White, 0.1% Black or African American, 0.0% Native American, 0.1% Asian, 0.0% Pacific Islander, 0.7% from other races and 5.0% from two or more races. Hispanic or Latino persons of any race comprised 3.3% of the population.

Of the 363 households, 36.1% of which had children under the age of 18 living with them, 49.6% were married couples living together, 4.4% were cohabitating couples, 32.8% had a female householder with no spouse or partner present and 13.2% had a male householder with no spouse or partner present. 33.9% of all households were non-families. 30.3% of all households were made up of individuals, 16.8% had someone living alone who was 65 years old or older.

The median age in the city was 35.7 years. 32.2% of the residents were under the age of 20; 3.2% were between the ages of 20 and 24; 25.7% were from 25 and 44; 23.2% were from 45 and 64; and 15.7% were 65 years of age or older. The gender makeup of the city was 48.0% male and 52.0% female.

=== 2010 census ===
As of the census of 2010, there were 842 people, 346 households, and 236 families living in the city. The population density was 1,830.4 inhabitants per square mile (706.7/km^{2}). There were 371 housing units at an average density of 806.5 per square mile (311.4/km^{2}). The racial makeup of the city was 98.8% White, 0.2% African American, 0.1% Native American, 0.1% Asian, 0.5% from other races, and 0.2% from two or more races. Hispanic or Latino of any race were 2.7% of the population.

There were 346 households, of which 38.2% had children under the age of 18 living with them, 51.4% were married couples living together, 11.3% had a female householder with no husband present, 5.5% had a male householder with no wife present, and 31.8% were non-families. 27.2% of all households were made up of individuals, and 11.2% had someone living alone who was 65 years of age or older. The average household size was 2.43 and the average family size was 2.98.

The median age in the city was 36.9 years. 28.5% of residents were under the age of 18; 7.3% were between the ages of 18 and 24; 24.8% were from 25 to 44; 24.8% were from 45 to 64; and 14.8% were 65 years of age or older. The gender makeup of the city was 49.3% male and 50.7% female.

=== 2000 census ===
As of the census of 2000, there were 845 people, 339 households, and 247 families living in the city. The population density was 2,087.9 inhabitants per square mile (806.1/km^{2}). There were 357 housing units at an average density of 882.1 per square mile (340.6/km^{2}). The racial makeup of the city was 98.58% White, 0.59% Native American, 0.71% Asian, 0.12% from other races. Hispanic or Latino of any race were 0.24% of the population.

There were 339 households, out of which 37.2% had children under the age of 18 living with them, 59.3% were married couples living together, 9.1% had a female householder with no husband present, and 27.1% were non-families. 24.2% of all households were made up of individuals, and 12.7% had someone living alone who was 65 years of age or older. The average household size was 2.49 and the average family size was 2.96.

In the city, the population was spread out, with 27.6% under the age of 18, 6.9% from 18 to 24, 29.7% from 25 to 44, 21.3% from 45 to 64, and 14.6% who were 65 years of age or older. The median age was 35 years. For every 100 females, there were 90.7 males. For every 100 females age 18 and over, there were 93.1 males.

The median income for a household in the city was $47,500, and the median income for a family was $49,632. Males had a median income of $30,288 versus $23,182 for females. The per capita income for the city was $17,737. About 4.3% of families and 7.3% of the population were below the poverty line, including 11.2% of those under age 18 and 5.7% of those age 65 or over.

== Education ==
Tri-Center Community School District operates schools serving Neola. Its high school is Tri-Center High School.

Saint Albert Catholic Schools in Council Bluffs takes students from Neola.

== Notable people ==
- Red Downs, professional baseball player and jewelry thief
- R. A. Lafferty, science fiction writer
- Red Morgan, professional baseball player
