= Little Sioux, Iowa =

- City
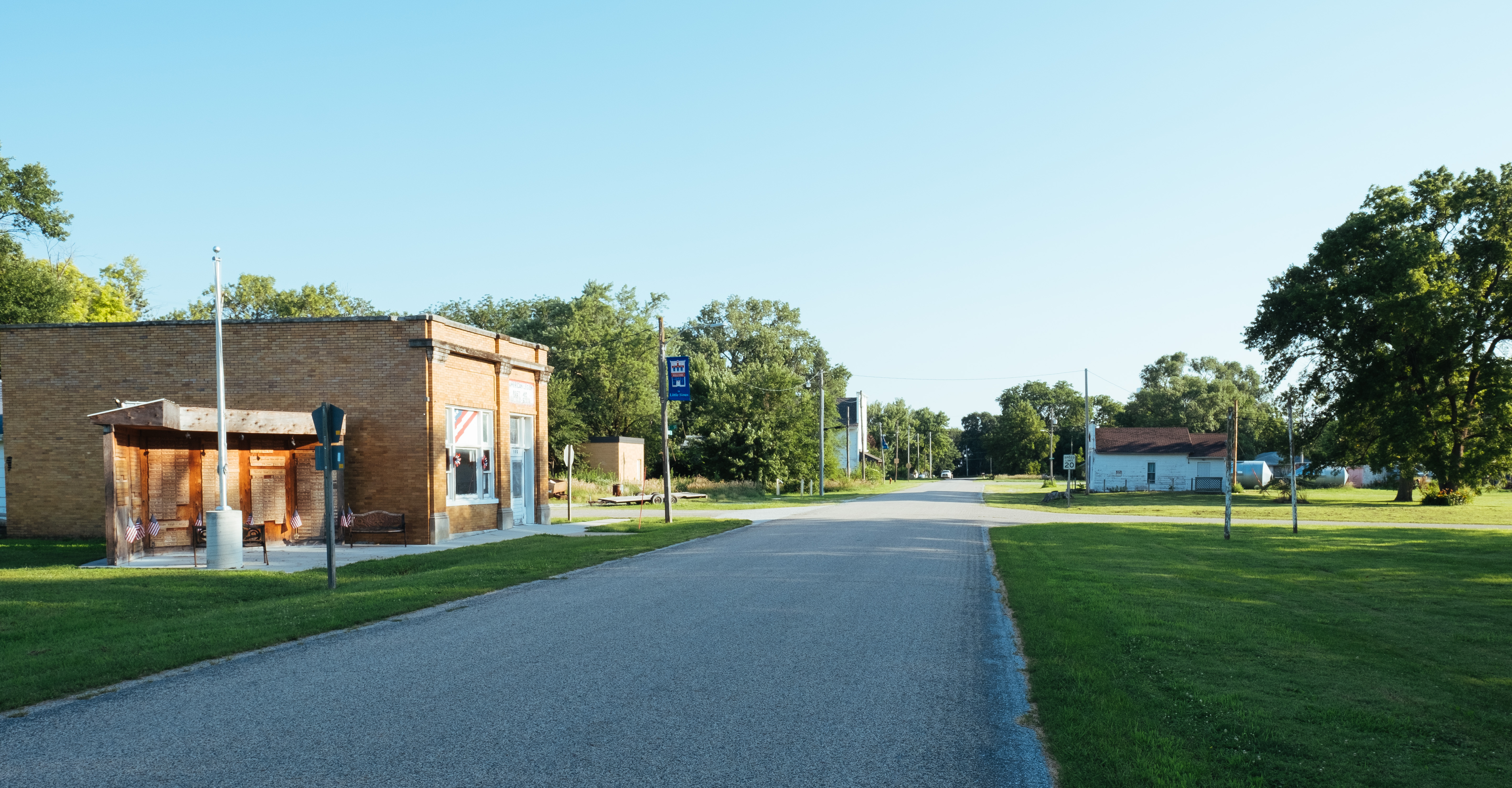
- Vine Street in Little Sioux

- Location of Little Sioux, Iowa

- Location within Iowa Location within the United States
- Coordinates: 41°48′29″N 96°01′39″W
- Country: USA
- State: Iowa
- County: Harrison
- Township: Little Sioux

Area
  - Total: 0.36 sq mi (0.93 km^{2})
  - Land: 0.36 sq mi (0.93 km^{2})
  - Water: 0 sq mi (0.00 km^{2})
- Elevation: 1,037 ft (316 m)

Population (2020)
  - Total: 166
  - Density: 462.3/sq mi (178.51/km^{2})
- Time zone: UTC-6 (Central (CST))
  - Summer (DST): UTC-5 (CDT)
- ZIP code: 51545
- Area code: 712
- FIPS code: 19-45840
- GNIS feature ID: 2395737

Little Sioux is a city in Harrison County, Iowa, United States. The population was 166 at the time of the 2020 census. The city is most known for Little Sioux Scout Ranch of the Boy Scouts of America.

== History ==
Little Sioux was laid out in 1855.

== Geography ==
According to the United States Census Bureau, the city has a total area of 0.37 square miles (0.96 km^{2}), all of it land.

== Demographics ==
Historical populations
Year	Pop.	±%
1880	369	—
1890	400	+8.4%
1900	427	+6.7%
1910	390	−8.7%
1920	436	+11.8%
1930	400	−8.3%
1940	434	+8.5%
1950	349	−19.6%
1960	295	−15.5%
1970	239	−19.0%
1980	251	+5.0%
1990	205	−18.3%
2000	217	+5.9%
2010	170	−21.7%
2020	166	−2.4%
Source:"U.S. Census website". United States Census Bureau. and Iowa Data Center; Source: U.S. Decennial Census

=== 2020 census ===
As of the census of 2020, there were 166 people, 72 households, and 39 families residing in the city. The population density was 462.3 inhabitants per square mile (178.5/km^{2}). There were 97 housing units at an average density of 270.2 per square mile (104.3/km^{2}). The racial makeup of the city was 93.4% White, 1.2% Black or African American, 0.6% Native American, 0.0% Asian, 0.0% Pacific Islander, 2.4% from other races and 2.4% from two or more races. Hispanic or Latino persons of any race comprised 7.2% of the population.

Of the 72 households, 20.8% of which had children under the age of 18 living with them, 37.5% were married couples living together, 9.7% were cohabitating couples, 26.4% had a female householder with no spouse or partner present and 26.4% had a male householder with no spouse or partner present. 45.8% of all households were non-families. 41.7% of all households were made up of individuals, 27.8% had someone living alone who was 65 years old or older.

The median age in the city was 51.0 years. 20.5% of the residents were under the age of 20; 3.6% were between the ages of 20 and 24; 17.5% were from 25 and 44; 27.1% were from 45 and 64; and 31.3% were 65 years of age or older. The gender makeup of the city was 53.6% male and 46.4% female.

=== 2010 census ===
As of the census of 2010, there were 170 people, 78 households, and 51 families living in the city. The population density was 459.5 inhabitants per square mile (177.4/km^{2}). There were 108 housing units at an average density of 291.9 per square mile (112.7/km^{2}). The racial makeup of the city was 100.0% White. Hispanic or Latino of any race were 2.4% of the population.

There were 78 households, of which 23.1% had children under the age of 18 living with them, 46.2% were married couples living together, 12.8% had a female householder with no husband present, 6.4% had a male householder with no wife present, and 34.6% were non-families. 33.3% of all households were made up of individuals, and 14.1% had someone living alone who was 65 years of age or older. The average household size was 2.18 and the average family size was 2.67.

The median age in the city was 48.5 years. 17.1% of residents were under the age of 18; 5.8% were between the ages of 18 and 24; 18.9% were from 25 to 44; 38.9% were from 45 to 64; and 19.4% were 65 years of age or older. The gender makeup of the city was 52.4% male and 47.6% female.

=== 2000 census ===
As of the census of 2000, there were 217 people, 96 households, and 62 families living in the city. The population density was 620.2 inhabitants per square mile (239.5/km^{2}). There were 111 housing units at an average density of 317.2 per square mile (122.5/km^{2}). The racial makeup of the city was 99.54% White, 0.46% from other races. Hispanic or Latino of any race were 0.46% of the population.

There were 96 households, out of which 22.9% had children under the age of 18 living with them, 51.0% were married couples living together, 10.4% had a female householder with no husband present, and 34.4% were non-families. 29.2% of all households were made up of individuals, and 16.7% had someone living alone who was 65 years of age or older. The average household size was 2.26 and the average family size was 2.78.

In the city, the population was spread out, with 20.7% under the age of 18, 9.2% from 18 to 24, 24.9% from 25 to 44, 26.3% from 45 to 64, and 18.9% who were 65 years of age or older. The median age was 42 years. For every 100 females, there were 92.0 males. For every 100 females age 18 and over, there were 89.0 males.

The median income for a household in the city was $28,583, and the median income for a family was $29,750. Males had a median income of $27,321 versus $16,250 for females. The per capita income for the city was $20,410. About 13.4% of families and 17.8% of the population were below the poverty line, including 28.0% of those under the age of eighteen and 21.2% of those 65 or over.

== Education ==
It is within the West Harrison Community School District.
