= Harrison County, Iowa =

County in Iowa, United States

- County
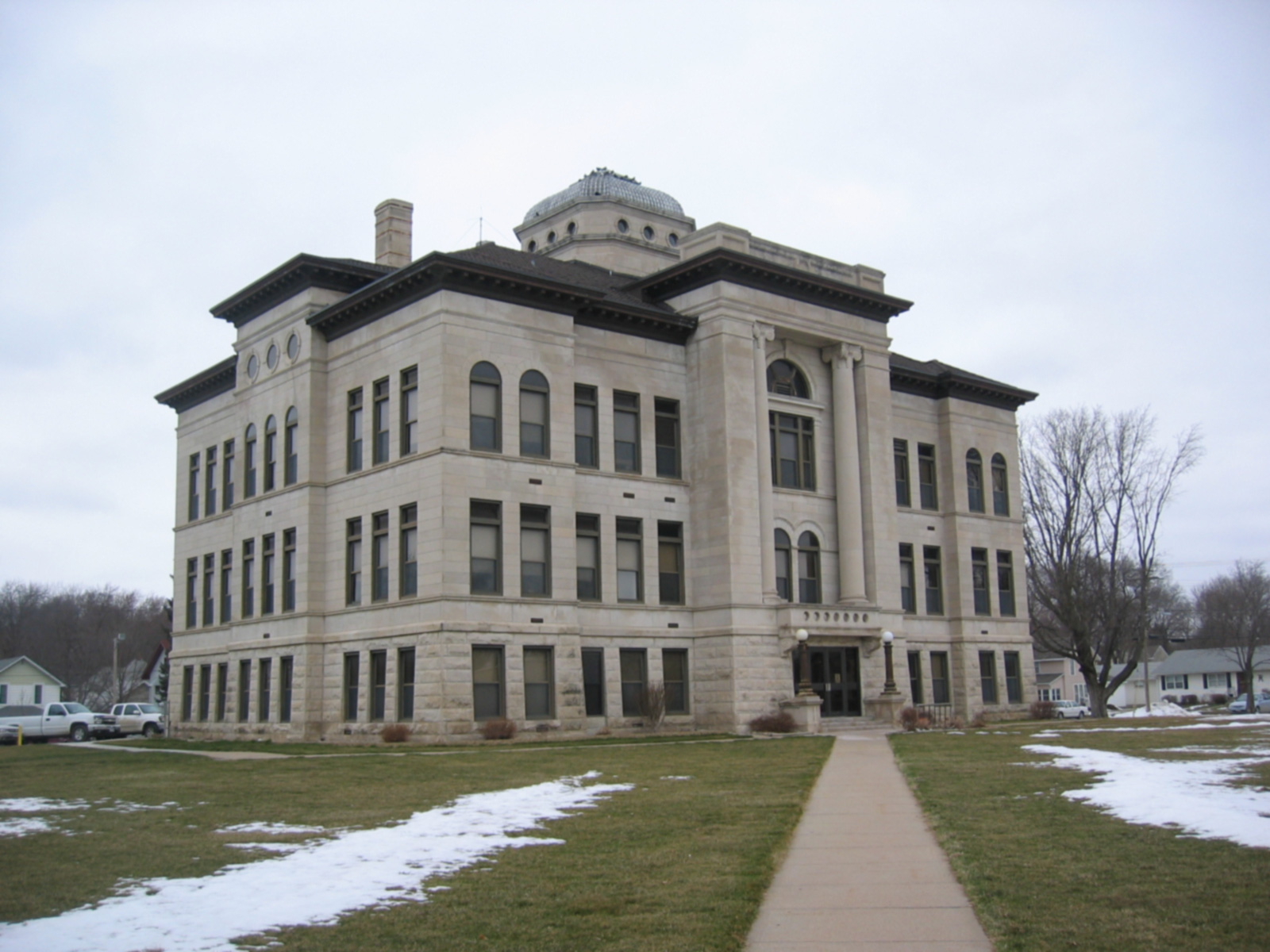
- The Harrison County Courthouse in Logan

- Location within the U.S. state of Iowa
- Coordinates: 41°40′56″N 95°49′27″W
- Country: United States
- State: Iowa
- Founded: 1851
- Named for: William Henry Harrison
- Seat: Logan
- Largest city: Missouri Valley

Area
  - Total: 702 sq mi (1,820 km^{2})
  - Land: 697 sq mi (1,810 km^{2})
  - Water: 4.8 sq mi (12 km^{2}) 0.7%

Population (2020)
  - Total: 14,582
  - Estimate (2025): 14,623 ▲
  - Density: 20.9/sq mi (8.08/km^{2})
- Time zone: UTC−6 (Central)
  - Summer (DST): UTC−5 (CDT)
- Congressional district: 4th
- Website: harrisoncounty.iowa.gov
- Iowa county number 43

Harrison County is a county located in the U.S. state of Iowa. As of the 2020 census, the population was 14,582. The county seat is Logan. The county was formed in 1851. It was named for the ninth US President William Henry Harrison. Harrison County is included in the Omaha–Council Bluffs metropolitan area.

== Geography ==
According to the United States Census Bureau, the county has a total area of 702 square miles (1,820 km^{2}), of which 697 square miles (1,810 km^{2}) is land and 4.8 square miles (12 km^{2}) (0.7%) is water.

=== Major highways ===
- Interstate 29
- U.S. Highway 30
- Iowa Highway 37
- Iowa Highway 44
- Iowa Highway 127
- Iowa Highway 183
- Iowa Highway 191

=== Adjacent counties ===
- Monona County (north)
- Crawford County (northeast)
- Shelby County (east)
- Pottawattamie County (south)
- Washington County, Nebraska (southwest)
- Burt County, Nebraska (northwest)

=== National protected area ===
- DeSoto National Wildlife Refuge (part)

== Demographics ==
Historical population
Census	Pop.	Note	%±
1860	3,621		—
1870	8,931		146.6%
1880	16,649		86.4%
1890	21,356		28.3%
1900	25,597		19.9%
1910	23,162		−9.5%
1920	24,488		5.7%
1930	24,897		1.7%
1940	22,767		−8.6%
1950	19,560		−14.1%
1960	17,600		−10.0%
1970	16,240		−7.7%
1980	16,348		0.7%
1990	14,730		−9.9%
2000	15,666		6.4%
2010	14,928		−4.7%
2020	14,582		−2.3%
2025 (est.)	14,623	▲	0.3%
U.S. Decennial Census; 1790–1960 1900–1990; 1990–2000 2010–2020

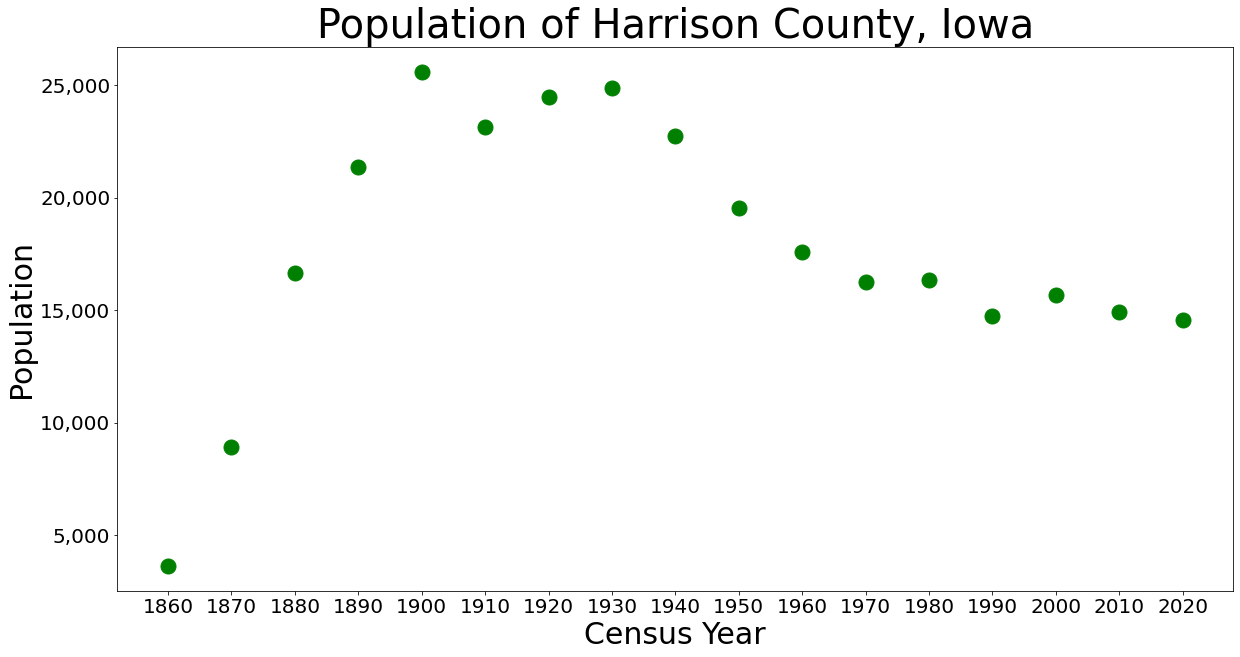
Population of Harrison County from US census data

=== 2020 census ===
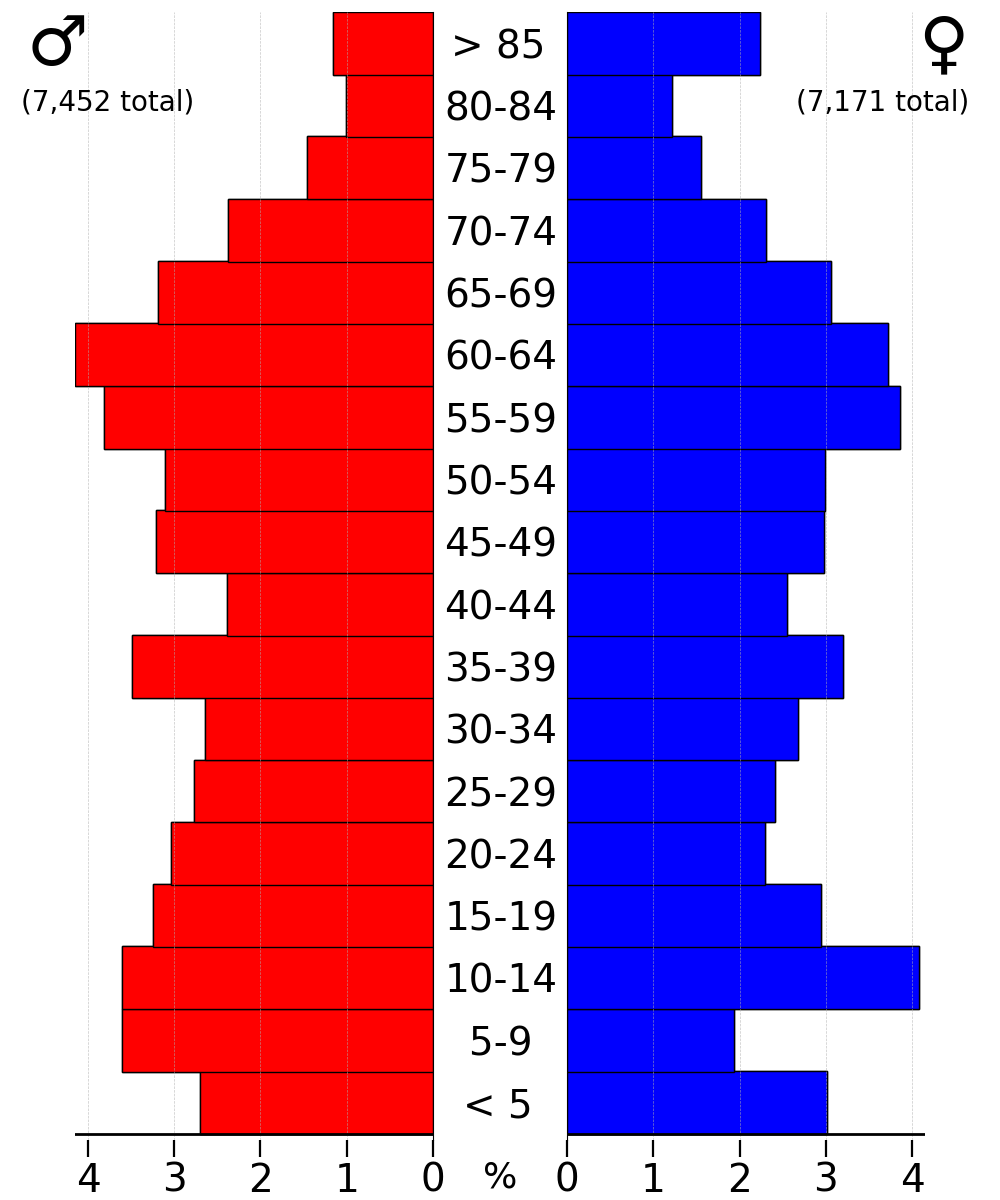
2022 US Census population pyramid for Harrison County from ACS 5-year estimates

As of the 2020 census, the county had a population of 14,582 and a population density of 20.8/sq mi (8.0/km^{2}). 96.78% of the population reported being of one race; 95.5% were White (93.46% non-Hispanic White), 0.2% Black or African American, 0.2% American Indian and Alaska Native, 0.3% Asian, <0.1% Native Hawaiian and Pacific Islander, 0.6% from some other race, and 3.2% from two or more races. Hispanic or Latino residents of any race comprised 2.0% of the population.

The median age was 43.5 years. 23.4% of residents were under the age of 18 and 20.7% of residents were 65 years of age or older. For every 100 females there were 101.6 males, and for every 100 females age 18 and over there were 100.3 males age 18 and over.

There were 5,951 households in the county, of which 27.6% had children under the age of 18 living in them. Of all households, 52.4% were married-couple households, 19.9% were households with a male householder and no spouse or partner present, and 21.2% were households with a female householder and no spouse or partner present. About 28.7% of all households were made up of individuals and 13.6% had someone living alone who was 65 years of age or older.

There were 6,665 housing units, of which 10.7% were vacant. Among occupied housing units, 76.0% were owner-occupied and 24.0% were renter-occupied. The homeowner vacancy rate was 2.2% and the rental vacancy rate was 8.9%.

<0.1% of residents lived in urban areas, while 100.0% lived in rural areas.

=== 2010 census ===
The 2010 census recorded a population of 14,928 in the county, with a population density of 21.4/sq mi (8.3/km^{2}). There were 6,731 housing units, of which 5,987 were occupied.

=== 2000 census ===
As of the census of 2000, there were 15,666 people, 6,115 households, and 4,304 families residing in the county. The population density was 22 people per square mile (8.5 people/km^{2}). There were 6,602 housing units at an average density of 10 units per square mile (3.9 units/km^{2}). The racial makeup of the county was 98.69% White, 0.08% Black or African American, 0.22% Native American, 0.16% Asian, 0.01% Pacific Islander, 0.20% from other races, and 0.64% from two or more races. 0.72% of the population were Hispanic or Latino of any race.

There were 6,115 households, out of which 32.30% had children under the age of 18 living with them, 59.30% were married couples living together, 7.60% had a female householder with no husband present, and 29.60% were non-families. 26.10% of all households were made up of individuals, and 13.70% had someone living alone who was 65 years of age or older. The average household size was 2.51 and the average family size was 3.02.

In the county, the population was spread out, with 26.20% under the age of 18, 6.80% from 18 to 24, 27.00% from 25 to 44, 22.30% from 45 to 64, and 17.70% who were 65 years of age or older. The median age was 39 years. For every 100 females there were 96.50 males. For every 100 females age 18 and over, there were 91.80 males.

The median income for a household in the county was $38,141, and the median income for a family was $44,586. Males had a median income of $30,000 versus $21,663 for females. The per capita income for the county was $17,662. About 5.00% of families and 7.10% of the population were below the poverty line, including 8.70% of those under age 18 and 8.70% of those age 65 or over.

== Communities ==
=== Cities ===
- Dunlap
- Little Sioux
- Logan
- Magnolia
- Missouri Valley
- Modale
- Mondamin
- Persia
- Pisgah
- Woodbine

=== Unincorporated communities ===
==== Townships ====
- Allen
- Boyer
- Calhoun
- Cass
- Cincinnati
- Clay
- Douglas
- Harrison
- Jackson
- Jefferson
- La Grange
- Lincoln
- Little Sioux
- Magnolia
- Morgan
- Raglan
- St. Johns
- Taylor
- Union
- Washington

==== Census Designated Places and Unincorporated Towns ====
- Allen
- Beebeetown
- Calhoun
- California Junction (CDP)
- Hard Scratch
- River Sioux (CDP)
- Orson
- Yorkshire

=== Population ranking ===
The population ranking of the following table is based on the 2020 census of Harrison County.

† county seat

Rank	City/Town/etc.	Municipal type	Population (2020 Census)
1	Missouri Valley	City	2,678
2	Woodbine	City	1,625
3	† Logan	City	1,397
4	Dunlap (partially in Crawford County)	City	1,038 (1,038 total)
5	Mondamin	City	339
6	Persia	City	297
7	Modale	City	273
8	Pisgah	City	249
9	Magnolia	City	190
10	Little Sioux	City	166
11	California Junction	CDP	74
12	River Sioux	CDP	42

== Politics ==
Harrison County is strongly Republican in presidential elections. Only seven Democratic Party candidates have won the county from 1880 to the present, the most recent of whom was Lyndon B. Johnson in 1964.

United States presidential election results for Harrison County, Iowa
Year	Republican		Democratic		Third party(ies)	
Year	No.	%	No.	%	No.	%
1896	2,839	46.48%	3,214	52.62%	55	0.90%
1900	3,303	52.50%	2,837	45.10%	151	2.40%
1904	3,364	62.05%	1,696	31.29%	361	6.66%
1908	2,914	52.40%	2,425	43.61%	222	3.99%
1912	1,528	28.72%	2,157	40.54%	1,636	30.75%
1916	2,610	45.88%	2,932	51.54%	147	2.58%
1920	6,127	62.89%	3,479	35.71%	136	1.40%
1924	5,062	51.01%	3,179	32.03%	1,683	16.96%
1928	5,605	55.79%	4,406	43.86%	35	0.35%
1932	3,513	31.91%	7,427	67.47%	68	0.62%
1936	5,314	45.50%	6,206	53.14%	158	1.35%
1940	6,094	53.33%	5,317	46.53%	17	0.15%
1944	5,059	54.35%	4,201	45.13%	49	0.53%
1948	4,341	48.15%	4,608	51.11%	67	0.74%
1952	5,972	63.76%	3,370	35.98%	24	0.26%
1956	5,209	58.30%	3,709	41.51%	17	0.19%
1960	4,940	57.70%	3,613	42.20%	9	0.11%
1964	3,203	41.13%	4,575	58.75%	9	0.12%
1968	3,867	56.66%	2,410	35.31%	548	8.03%
1972	4,721	65.83%	2,369	33.04%	81	1.13%
1976	3,489	51.38%	3,228	47.54%	73	1.08%
1980	4,502	63.83%	2,152	30.51%	399	5.66%
1984	4,352	63.24%	2,495	36.25%	35	0.51%
1988	3,108	51.57%	2,883	47.83%	36	0.60%
1992	2,763	40.23%	2,349	34.20%	1,756	25.57%
1996	3,070	47.04%	2,576	39.47%	881	13.50%
2000	3,802	58.11%	2,551	38.99%	190	2.90%
2004	4,680	60.94%	2,906	37.84%	94	1.22%
2008	3,909	51.55%	3,555	46.88%	119	1.57%
2012	4,065	55.52%	3,136	42.83%	121	1.65%
2016	4,902	65.67%	2,131	28.55%	432	5.79%
2020	5,569	68.29%	2,440	29.92%	146	1.79%
2024	5,566	69.93%	2,245	28.21%	148	1.86%

== See also ==
- Harrison County Courthouse (Iowa)
- National Register of Historic Places listings in Harrison County, Iowa
- Old Harrison County Courthouse (Iowa)
