= Logan, Iowa =

- City
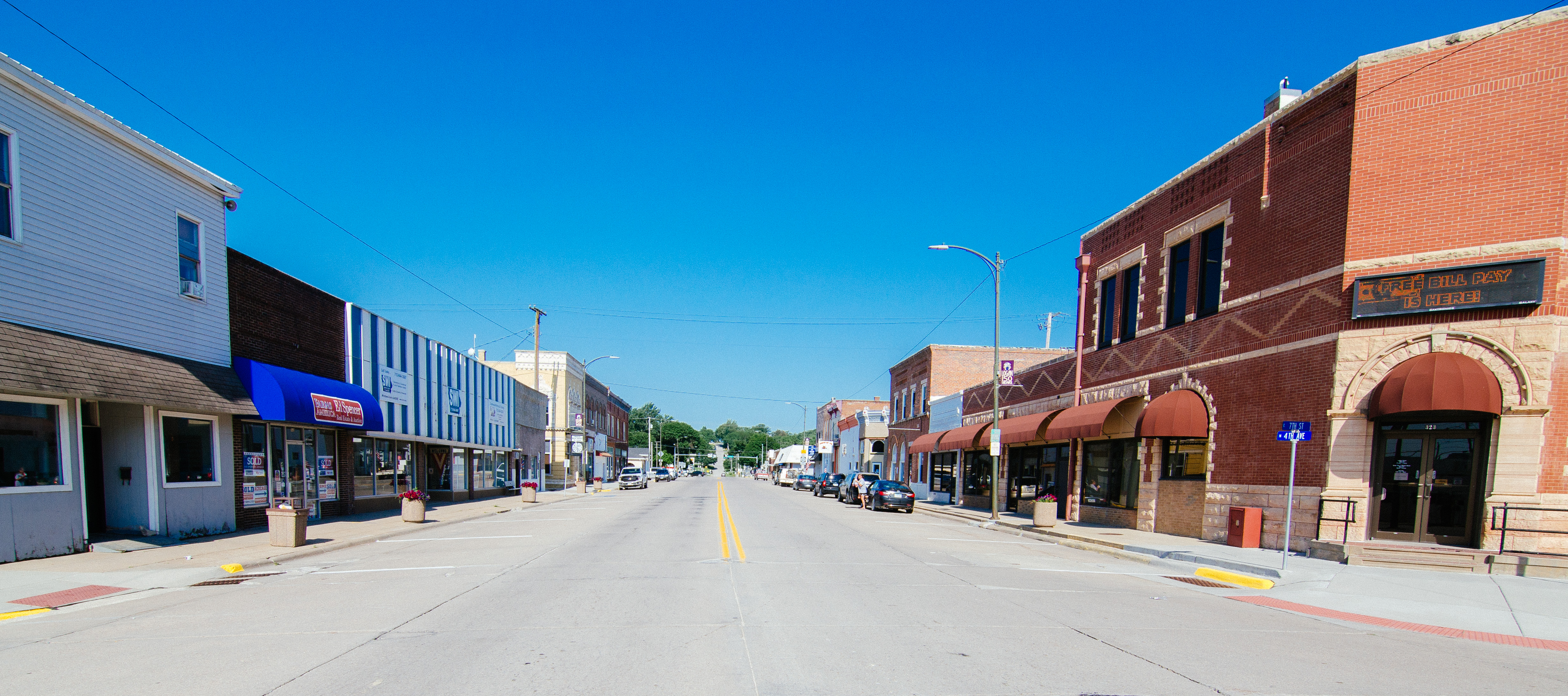
- The Lincoln Highway in downtown Logan

- Location of Logan within Harrison County and Iowa
- Coordinates: 41°38′43″N 95°47′29″W
- Country: United States
- State: Iowa
- County: Harrison
- Incorporated: April 22, 1876

Area
  - Total: 1.00 sq mi (2.60 km^{2})
  - Land: 1.00 sq mi (2.60 km^{2})
  - Water: 0 sq mi (0.00 km^{2})
- Elevation: 1,102 ft (336 m)

Population (2020)
  - Total: 1,397
  - Density: 1,390/sq mi (536.6/km^{2})
- Time zone: UTC-6 (CST)
  - Summer (DST): UTC-5 (CDT)
- ZIP codes: 51546, 51550
- Area code: 712
- FIPS code: 19-46155
- GNIS feature ID: 2395744
- Website: www.loganiowa.org

Logan is a city in and the county seat of Harrison County, Iowa, United States, along the Boyer River. The population was 1,397 at the time of the 2020 census.

== History ==
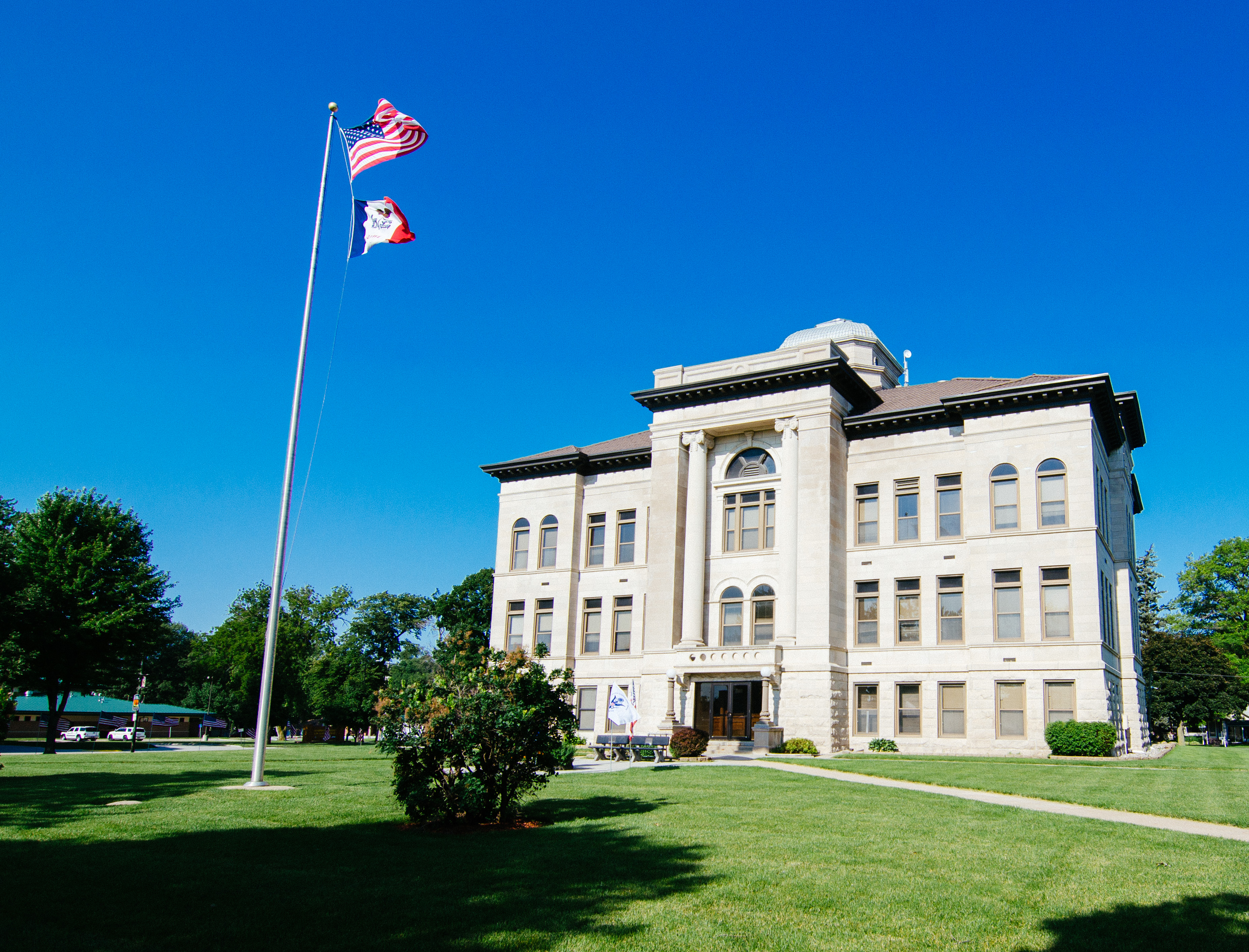
Harrison County Courthouse

Logan was platted in 1867 when Chicago and North Western Railway was extended to that point. It was named for John A. Logan, a Union Army general.

== Geography ==
According to the United States Census Bureau, the city has a total area of 1.00 square mile (2.59 km^{2}), all of it land.

=== Climate ===
Climate data for Logan, Iowa (1991–2020, extremes 1893–present)
Month	Jan	Feb	Mar	Apr	May	Jun	Jul	Aug	Sep	Oct	Nov	Dec	Year
Record high °F (°C)	69 (21)	74 (23)	89 (32)	99 (37)	109 (43)	108 (42)	117 (47)	113 (45)	107 (42)	96 (36)	83 (28)	72 (22)	117 (47)
Mean maximum °F (°C)	53.4 (11.9)	59.1 (15.1)	74.3 (23.5)	85.0 (29.4)	90.7 (32.6)	94.3 (34.6)	95.1 (35.1)	93.9 (34.4)	91.5 (33.1)	85.7 (29.8)	70.6 (21.4)	56.5 (13.6)	97.2 (36.2)
Mean daily maximum °F (°C)	30.7 (−0.7)	35.5 (1.9)	48.9 (9.4)	61.7 (16.5)	72.5 (22.5)	82.4 (28.0)	85.6 (29.8)	83.7 (28.7)	77.5 (25.3)	64.7 (18.2)	48.6 (9.2)	35.3 (1.8)	60.6 (15.9)
Daily mean °F (°C)	20.3 (−6.5)	24.5 (−4.2)	37.4 (3.0)	49.0 (9.4)	61.0 (16.1)	71.3 (21.8)	74.8 (23.8)	72.5 (22.5)	64.4 (18.0)	51.4 (10.8)	37.0 (2.8)	25.3 (−3.7)	49.1 (9.5)
Mean daily minimum °F (°C)	9.9 (−12.3)	13.5 (−10.3)	25.8 (−3.4)	36.3 (2.4)	49.4 (9.7)	60.1 (15.6)	64.1 (17.8)	61.2 (16.2)	51.3 (10.7)	38.2 (3.4)	25.4 (−3.7)	15.3 (−9.3)	37.5 (3.1)
Mean minimum °F (°C)	−13.7 (−25.4)	−8.2 (−22.3)	4.6 (−15.2)	20.8 (−6.2)	33.9 (1.1)	46.9 (8.3)	52.9 (11.6)	50.6 (10.3)	35.7 (2.1)	22.2 (−5.4)	8.4 (−13.1)	−6.4 (−21.3)	−18.0 (−27.8)
Record low °F (°C)	−35 (−37)	−34 (−37)	−21 (−29)	4 (−16)	21 (−6)	36 (2)	35 (2)	37 (3)	19 (−7)	−2 (−19)	−14 (−26)	−30 (−34)	−35 (−37)
Average precipitation inches (mm)	0.72 (18)	0.98 (25)	1.82 (46)	3.40 (86)	4.95 (126)	5.21 (132)	4.06 (103)	4.29 (109)	3.54 (90)	2.61 (66)	1.45 (37)	1.40 (36)	34.43 (875)
Average snowfall inches (cm)	7.9 (20)	6.4 (16)	4.1 (10)	0.9 (2.3)	0.0 (0.0)	0.0 (0.0)	0.0 (0.0)	0.0 (0.0)	0.0 (0.0)	0.6 (1.5)	2.2 (5.6)	6.6 (17)	28.7 (73)
Average precipitation days (≥ 0.01 in)	5.0	5.6	7.2	9.7	12.5	9.9	8.6	8.9	7.6	7.1	5.2	5.6	92.9
Average snowy days (≥ 0.1 in)	3.9	3.3	1.9	0.5	0.0	0.0	0.0	0.0	0.0	0.4	1.5	3.6	15.1
Source: NOAA

== Demographics ==
Historical populations
Year	Pop.	±%
1880	644	—
1890	827	+28.4%
1900	1,377	+66.5%
1910	1,453	+5.5%
1920	1,637	+12.7%
1930	1,654	+1.0%
1940	1,700	+2.8%
1950	1,550	−8.8%
1960	1,605	+3.5%
1970	1,526	−4.9%
1980	1,540	+0.9%
1990	1,401	−9.0%
2000	1,545	+10.3%
2010	1,534	−0.7%
2020	1,397	−8.9%
Source:"U.S. Census website". United States Census Bureau. and Iowa Data Center; Source: U.S. Decennial Census

=== 2020 census ===
As of the 2020 census, Logan had a population of 1,397, with 573 households and 341 families residing in the city. The population density was 1,389.8 inhabitants per square mile (536.6/km^{2}). There were 636 housing units at an average density of 632.7 per square mile (244.3/km^{2}).

The median age was 40.3 years. 24.4% of residents were under the age of 18, and 16.6% were 65 years of age or older. 27.3% of residents were under the age of 20; 4.3% were between the ages of 20 and 24; 23.9% were from 25 to 44; and 27.8% were from 45 to 64. The gender makeup of the city was 48.5% male and 51.5% female. For every 100 females there were 94.3 males, and for every 100 females age 18 and over there were 93.1 males age 18 and over.

0.0% of residents lived in urban areas, while 100.0% lived in rural areas.

Of the 573 households, 28.6% had children under the age of 18 living in them. Of all households, 44.7% were married-couple households, 7.2% were cohabitating couple households, 22.2% were households with a male householder and no spouse or partner present, and 26.0% were households with a female householder and no spouse or partner present. Non-families made up 40.5% of all households. About 33.8% of all households were made up of individuals, and 13.2% had someone living alone who was 65 years of age or older.

There were 636 housing units, of which 9.9% were vacant. The homeowner vacancy rate was 3.4% and the rental vacancy rate was 12.0%.

Racial composition as of the 2020 census
Race	Number	Percent
White	1,345	96.3%
Black or African American	3	0.2%
American Indian and Alaska Native	3	0.2%
Asian	1	0.1%
Native Hawaiian and Other Pacific Islander	0	0.0%
Some other race	6	0.4%
Two or more races	39	2.8%
Hispanic or Latino (of any race)	19	1.4%

=== 2010 census ===
As of the census of 2010, there were 1,534 people, 595 households, and 397 families living in the city. The population density was 1,534.0 inhabitants per square mile (592.3/km^{2}). There were 649 housing units at an average density of 649.0 per square mile (250.6/km^{2}). The racial makeup of the city was 98.6% White, 0.1% African American, 0.1% Native American, 0.4% Asian, and 0.8% from two or more races. Hispanic or Latino of any race were 0.8% of the population.

There were 595 households, of which 35.0% had children under the age of 18 living with them, 54.1% were married couples living together, 9.1% had a female householder with no husband present, 3.5% had a male householder with no wife present, and 33.3% were non-families. 27.2% of all households were made up of individuals, and 14.1% had someone living alone who was 65 years of age or older. The average household size was 2.49 and the average family size was 3.07.

The median age in the city was 38.5 years. 26.9% of residents were under the age of 18; 6.1% were between the ages of 18 and 24; 25.5% were from 25 to 44; 24.9% were from 45 to 64; and 16.7% were 65 years of age or older. The gender makeup of the city was 48.7% male and 51.3% female.

=== 2000 census ===
As of the census of 2000, there were 1,545 people, 608 households, and 395 families living in the city. The population density was 1,522.8 inhabitants per square mile (588.0/km^{2}). There were 660 housing units at an average density of 650.5 per square mile (251.2/km^{2}). The racial makeup of the city was 99.29% White, 0.13% African American, 0.13% Native American, 0.13% Asian, 0.13% from other races, and 0.19% from two or more races. Hispanic or Latino of any race were 0.65% of the population.

There were 608 households, out of which 32.4% had children under the age of 18 living with them, 53.8% were married couples living together, 8.6% had a female householder with no husband present, and 35.0% were non-families. 32.2% of all households were made up of individuals, and 18.1% had someone living alone who was 65 years of age or older. The average household size was 2.43 and the average family size was 3.09.

Age spread: 27.1% under the age of 18, 6.1% from 18 to 24, 27.5% from 25 to 44, 18.2% from 45 to 64, and 21.1% who were 65 years of age or older. The median age was 38 years. For every 100 females, there were 90.0 males. For every 100 females age 18 and over, there were 79.9 males.

The median income for a household in the city was $35,455, and the median income for a family was $44,375. Males had a median income of $30,347 versus $20,625 for females. The per capita income for the city was $18,709. About 5.6% of families and 9.5% of the population were below the poverty line, including 10.0% of those under age 18 and 11.6% of those age 65 or over.

== Education ==
Logan–Magnolia Community School District operates local public schools.

== See also ==
- Harrison County Courthouse
