= Iowa Highway 183 =

State highway in Iowa, United States

Iowa Highway 183
- Iowa 183 highlighted in red

Route information
- Maintained by Iowa DOT
- Length: 29.952 mi (48.203 km)

Major junctions
- South end: Iowa 127 east of Mondamin
- Iowa 37 in Soldier
- North end: Iowa 141 in Ute

Location
- Country: United States
- State: Iowa
- Counties: Harrison; Monona

Highway system
- Iowa Primary Highway System; Interstate; US; State; Secondary; Scenic
← Iowa 182	→ Iowa 187

Iowa Highway 183 (Iowa 183) is a state highway in western Iowa. It runs north to south for 30 miles (48 km). It begins at an intersection with Iowa Highway 127 east of Mondamin and ends at an intersection with Iowa Highway 141 in Ute. The highway as currently constituted is the same as it was when it was commissioned in 1930. The first 17 miles (27 km) of the route are a part of the Loess Hills Scenic Byway.

Previously, the highway began at U.S. Highway 30 in Missouri Valley. It was extended to U.S. Highway 6 in Council Bluffs and then truncated to the northern city limits of Council Bluffs. The previously existing segment between Missouri Valley and Council Bluffs was a portion of the Lincoln Highway and is now County Road L20 in Harrison and Pottawattamie Counties.

== Route description ==
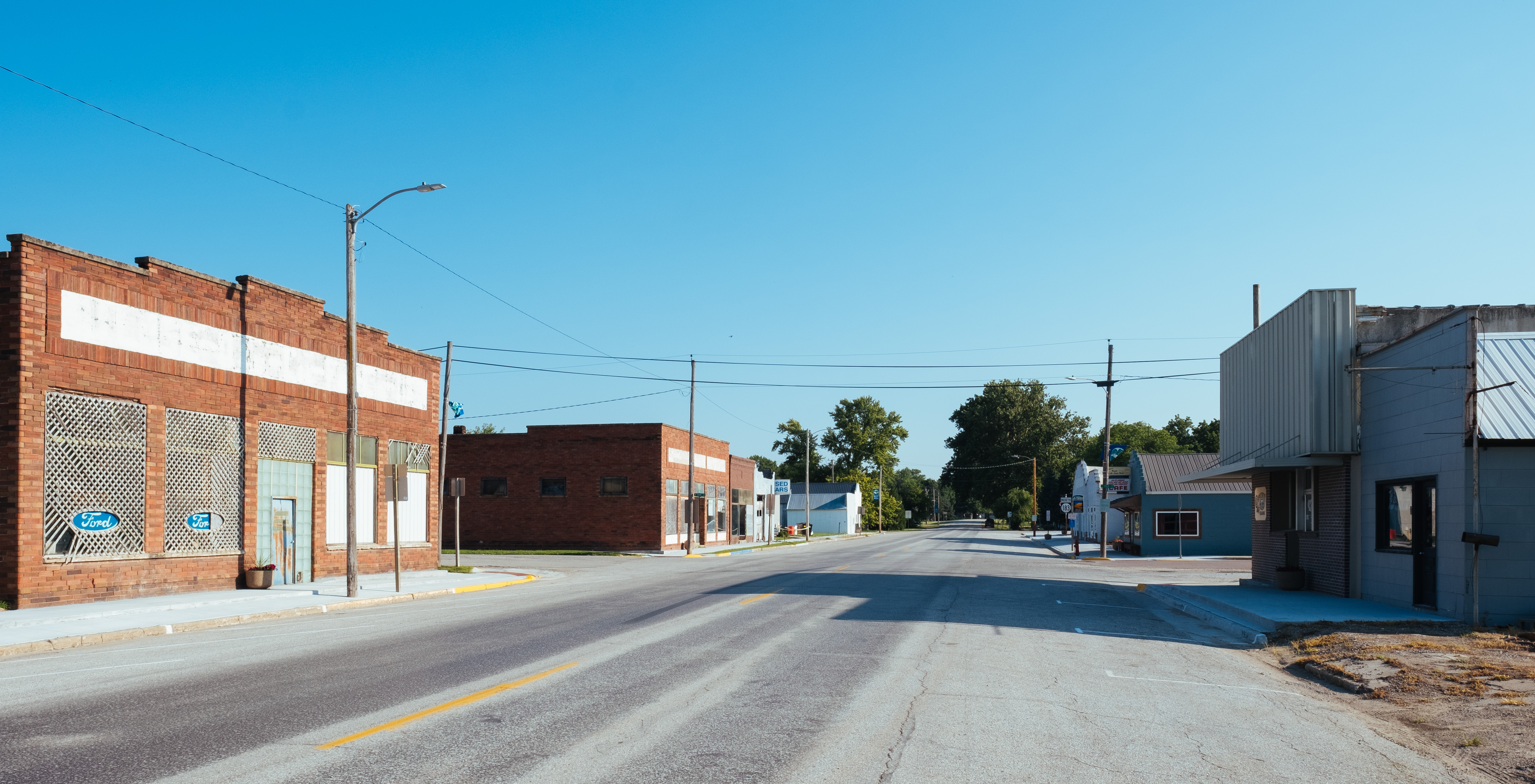
Iowa 183 as it passes through Pisgah

Iowa Highway 183 begins 3 miles (4.8 km) east of Mondamin, at the foot of the Loess Hills, at an intersection with Iowa Highway 127. It heads north along the Loess Hills Scenic Byway (LHSB) with the Loess Hills rising immediately to the east. On the way to Pisgah, the highway approaches the Soldier River, which it follows for the rest of its routing. From Pisgah, Iowa 183 turns northeast and travels 7 miles (11 km) to Moorhead, where the LHSB splits off to the north. Northeast of Moorhead, it continues 5 1/2 miles (8.9 km) to Soldier, where it intersects Iowa Highway 37. The highway travels 6 miles (9.7 km) further to Ute, where it ends at Iowa Highway 141.

== History ==
Iowa 183 was designated in the 1930s along the same path the route follows today; however the route where it began east of Mondamin was US 75. By 1947, the only section of Iowa 183 that had been paved were 6 miles (9.7 km) between Iowa 37 and Ute. Within ten years the entire route had been paved. After Interstate 29 (I-29) was built along the eastern bank of the Missouri River, Iowa 183 underwent some changes. In 1968, when US 75 was moved onto I-29, Iowa 183 was extended south to US 30 at Missouri Valley. A year later, it was extended further south along US 30A, ending at US 6 in Council Bluffs. The highway was 64 miles (103 km) long at its longest extent. Starting in the early 1980s, the Iowa Department of Transportation (Iowa DOT) began to shorten Iowa 183's route. By 1983, the route had been truncated to Council Bluffs's northern city limits. On July 1, 2003, the highway was shortened back to its original southern end east of Mondamin, now along Iowa 127.

== Major intersections ==
County	Location	mi	km	Destinations	Notes
Harrison	Raglan Township	0.000	0.000	Iowa 127 / Loess Hills Scenic Byway south – Mondamin, Logan, Missouri Valley	Southern end of LHSB overlap
Monona	Moorhead	17.164	27.623	Loess Hills Scenic Byway north	Northern end of LHSB overlap
Monona	Soldier	23.278	37.462	Iowa 37 – Onawa, Dunlap	
Monona	Ute	29.952	48.203	Iowa 141 – Mapleton, Denison	
1.000 mi = 1.609 km; 1.000 km = 0.621 mi
