= U.S. Route 30 in Iowa =

U.S. Highway in Iowa

U.S. Highway 30
- US 30 highlighted in red

Route information
- Maintained by Iowa DOT
- Length: 330.856 mi (532.461 km)
- Existed: 1926–present
- History: Lincoln Highway from 1913–1928

Major junctions
- West end: US 30 at Blair, Nebraska
- I-29 at Missouri Valley; US 59 / Iowa 141 at Denison; US 71 at Carroll; US 169 at Ogden; I-35 at Ames; US 65 at Colo; US 63 at Toledo; I-380 / US 218 at Cedar Rapids; US 61 at De Witt; US 67 at Clinton
- East end: US 30 at Fulton, Illinois

Location
- Country: United States
- State: Iowa
- Counties: Harrison; Crawford; Carroll; Greene; Boone; Story; Marshall; Tama; Benton; Linn; Cedar; Clinton

Highway system
- United States Numbered Highway System; List; Special; Divided; Iowa Primary Highway System; Interstate; US; State; Secondary; Scenic
← I-29	→ Iowa 31

U.S. Highway 30 (US 30) is a major east–west U.S. Highway which spans 330 miles (530 km) across the state of Iowa. It is the longest primary highway in the state and is maintained by the Iowa Department of Transportation (Iowa DOT). The route in Iowa begins at the Missouri River crossing at Blair, Nebraska, and ends at the Mississippi River crossing at Clinton, Iowa. Along the way, it serves Denison and Carroll in western Iowa, Boone, Ames, and Marshalltown in central Iowa, and Tama, Cedar Rapids, and DeWitt in eastern Iowa. Cutting across the central portion of the state, US 30 runs within close proximity of the Union Pacific Railroad's Overland Route for its entire length.

US 30 was conceived as a part of the Lincoln Highway, the first transcontinental highway in the United States. A route through Iowa was chosen because of the important link between Omaha, Nebraska, and Chicago, Illinois. As the U.S. Highway System came into being in the 1920s, and the Lincoln Highway became US 30, federal money started to pay for paving Iowa's dirt roads. By 1931, the route had been paved across the entire state.

The route of the Lincoln Highway and US 30 has accommodated the changing needs of the traveling public. Early Lincoln Highway travelers were directed into many small towns as the route traveled 358 miles (576 km) across the state. Towards the middle of the 20th century, the route was straightened, bypassing most downtown areas and several towns altogether. More recently, long sections of US 30 have been upgraded to a four-lane expressway to accommodate increasing traffic. Since 2006, the highway has been designated an Iowa Heritage Byway by Iowa DOT, the first highway in the state with that distinction.

== Route description ==
US 30 extends from west to east across the central portion of Iowa, with much of the highway traveling through rolling farmland. Small towns dot the entire route, which connects the larger cities of Denison, Ames, Marshalltown, Cedar Rapids, and Clinton. Between Ogden and Mount Vernon, significant portions of the highway have been upgraded to a four-lane freeway.

=== Western Iowa ===
US 30 enters the western end of Iowa by crossing the Missouri River on the Blair Bridge, located east of the Nebraska town of the same name. Adjacent to the highway bridge is the Union Pacific Railroad's river crossing for the Overland Route. The highway runs roughly parallel to the rail line for its entire run across Iowa. For nine miles (14 km), traffic moves through the flat Missouri River bottoms, passing DeSoto National Wildlife Refuge on the way to Missouri Valley. At Missouri Valley, it intersects Interstate 29 (I-29) at a partial cloverleaf interchange. It enters the Boyer River valley through the Loess Hills, a region of wind-deposited silt extending from north of Sioux City to extreme northwestern Missouri. The rolling Loess Hills rise 50–100 feet (15–30 m) above the roadway while the land in the valley stays relatively flat. US 30 enters Logan and intersects the eastern end of Iowa Highway 127 (Iowa 127). The highway runs parallel to the Boyer River as well as the Overland Route in a general northeast direction from Logan. Four miles (6.4 km) east of Logan is the western end of Iowa 44, which extends 105 miles (169 km) east to Des Moines.

The highway enters Crawford County north of Dunlap in Harrison County. For seventeen miles (27 km), US 30 passes through farmland and the small communities of Dow City and Arion. For one-half mile (800 m) through Denison, it overlaps US 59 and Iowa 141, which run concurrently through the town. The Iowa DOT refers to routes which overlap other routes as duplicate routes. It follows the East Boyer River through Denison as the Boyer River forks west of the northern intersection with US 59 / Iowa 141. US 30 travels north-northeasterly towards Vail. Between Vail and Westside, the highway ceases following the East Boyer River and heads due east towards Arcadia and Carroll in Carroll County.

At Carroll it intersects US 71 on the western side of the city. Continuing east, the highway goes through the town of Glidden and passes to the north of Ralston, west of the Greene County line. North of Scranton it meets the northern end of Iowa 25. Between Scranton and Jefferson, US 30 crosses the Raccoon River. US 30 crosses Iowa 4 and Iowa 144 on the northern edge of Jefferson and Grand Junction, the latter of the cities named for its location at the junction of the historic Chicago & Northwestern and Chicago, Rock Island and Pacific Railroads, both owned by Union Pacific. East of Grand Junction, the highway passes over the Overland Route where it stays south of the railroad until Le Grand.

=== Central Iowa ===
Four miles (6.4 km) west of Ogden, US 30 is joined by US 169 from the north. The two highways run concurrently until reaching Ogden, where the road becomes a four-lane expressway. US 169 exits to the south at a partial cloverleaf interchange, while US 30 continues east through Boone County and descends into the Des Moines River valley. It ascends from the valley and travels another two miles (3.2 km) to a four-way stop in Boone, which is the last stop along the route until Iowa 1 in Mt. Vernon, though this has become a roundabout. Three miles (4.8 km) east of Boone, it meets Iowa 17 at a diamond interchange. One mile (1.6 km) east of that interchange is a shortcut to northbound Iowa 17.

Traffic is filtered into Ames and Iowa State University (ISU) from US 30 through five interchanges. On the outskirts of Ames are the Lincoln Way interchanges, access to and from Lincoln Way is handled by two half interchanges three-quarters mile (1.2 km) apart. From the interchanges to the Story County line one and three-quarters miles (2.8 km) away, Lincoln Way is designated as Iowa 930, but is never signed as such. The South Dakota Avenue interchange primarily serves the southwestern part of Ames. The University Boulevard (formerly Elwood Drive) exit provides access to the Iowa State University campus and Iowa State Center, ISU's cultural and athletics complex. The Duff Avenue interchange provides access to Ames's east side. US 69 and Interstate 35 Business Loop are designated along Duff Avenue. From Duff to I-35, US 30 is overlapped by the I-35 Business Loop. Between the Duff and Dayton Avenue interchanges, it crosses the South Skunk River. The Dayton Avenue interchange serves hotels and restaurants and is a travel stop for I-35 travelers.

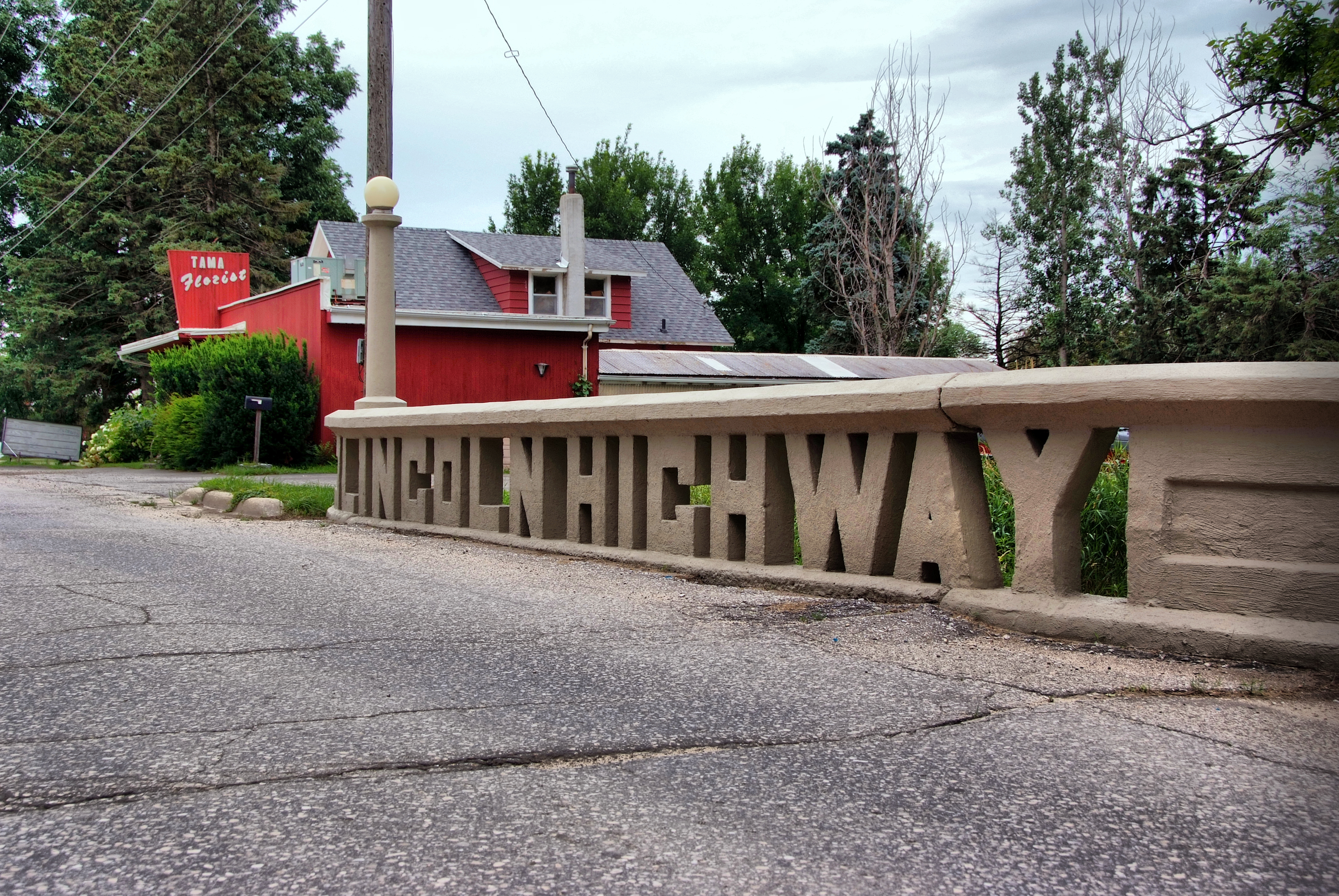
The Lincoln Highway bridge in Tama

East of the Dayton Avenue interchange is I-35, which connects US 30 to Minneapolis, Minnesota, to the north, and Des Moines to the south. Continuing east, the expressway travels six and a half miles (10.5 km) to Nevada, six miles (9.7 km) more to the US 65 interchange at Colo, seven and a half miles (12.1 km) to State Center, and seven and a half miles (12.1 km) the Iowa 330 interchange on the western edge of Marshalltown. One mile (1.6 km) to the east are two half-interchanges with U.S. Route 30 Business (US 30 Business). US 30 bypasses Marshalltown approximately one-quarter mile (400 m) south of its business loop. Near Marshalltown Community College, it intersects Iowa 14 at a diamond interchange. The 18th Avenue interchange on the southeastern side of Marshalltown is the eastern end of the business loop. From Marshalltown, it travels five miles (8.0 km) to Le Grand, crossing over the Overland Route rail corridor on the west side. It bypasses Le Grand to the north, where it intersects the northern end of Iowa 146 at a diamond interchange. Continuing east, the highway enters Tama County. It rises over a large hill north of Montour and then descends into the Iowa River valley.

East of the Iowa River is the Meskwaki Settlement, which is home to about 800 Meskwaki Native American tribespeople and the Meskwaki Casino and Resort. As it heads into the Tama–Toledo area, the expressway bisects the two communities. Between the two cities, it meets US 63 at a partial cloverleaf interchange. From US 63 it turns to the southeast to skirt Tama's east side. It rejoins the former alignment of the highway east of Tama and heads due east, along section lines in Tama and Benton Counties, and does not enter another town for 40 miles (64 km).

=== Eastern Iowa ===
US 30 enters Benton County nine miles (14 km) north of Belle Plaine at an intersection with Iowa 21. It continues east along a section line, passing the communities of Keystone, Van Horne, and Blairstown. Three and a half miles (5.6 km) southwest of Newhall, or four and a quarter miles (6.8 km) southeast of Van Horne, it meets US 218 and becomes a four-lane road. US 30 and US 218 travel together due east towards Cedar Rapids, passing Norway and Atkins. On the western end of Cedar Rapids, US 30 / US 218 turn to the southeast at the 16th Avenue SW interchange. Two miles (3.2 km) to the southeast is the Williams Boulevard interchange, where US 151 joins US 30 and US 218. For four miles (6.4 km), US 30 / US 151 / US 218 is a wrong-way concurrency; that is, where two or more routes heading in opposite directions share the same highway. In this instance, US 30 is the main east–west road while US 151 and US 218 are duplicate routes, nominally heading north and south, respectively. At the I-380 interchange, US 218 leaves US 30 / US 151 and joins the Avenue of the Saints highway. East of I-380, US 30 / US 151 serve as a divider between the Lincolnway Village neighborhood to the south and a light industrial district to the north.

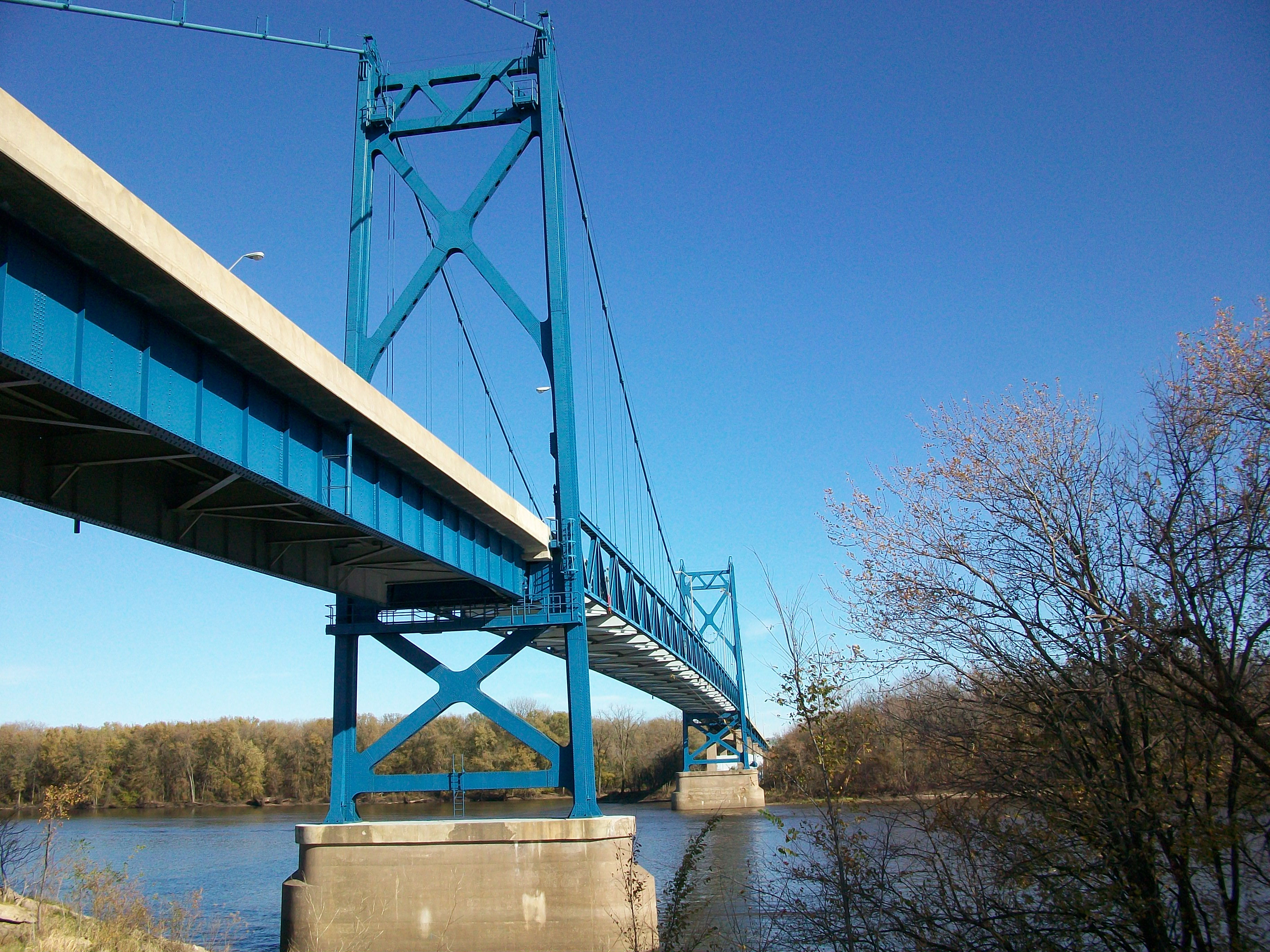
US 30 crosses the Mississippi River at Clinton via the Gateway Bridge.

South of Bertram, the two routes cross the Cedar River before US 151 splits away from US 30 to the north at a trumpet interchange. This interchange is the southern end of Iowa 13. The road dips southeast, ultimately bypassing the cities of Mount Vernon and Lisbon, while converging back into a 2-lane road at the conclusion of the bypass. Over the next 45 miles (72 km), US 30 passes through a small town every four to seven miles (6 to 11 km). In Cedar County it passes through Mechanicsville, Stanwood, Clarence and Lowden. In Stanwood, it is overlapped by Iowa 38 for one mile (1.6 km). In Clinton County, it passes through Wheatland, Calamus, and Grand Mound before reaching a full cloverleaf interchange with US 61 at DeWitt. US 30 overlaps US 61 for one mile (1.6 km), crossing the Union Pacific Overland Route in the process, and leaves US 61 via a trumpet interchange.

US 30 continues east as an expressway, passing DeWitt to the south. Five miles (8 km) east of DeWitt, it crosses back over to the north side of the Overland Route. West of the Clinton city limits is an interchange with Clinton County Road Z36 (CR Z36), which serves Low Moor and as a shortcut to southbound US 67. East of CR Z36, it passes the Clinton Municipal Airport and a large chemical plant. As it approaches Mill Creek Parkway, it descends over 100 feet (30 m) in elevation into the flat Mississippi River valley, where it meets US 67. US 30 / US 67 head east along Lincoln Way and ascend 50 feet (15 m) onto a plateau, atop which reside stores and restaurants. As they continue east, the two routes split into one-way streets, eastbound Liberty Avenue and westbound Camanche Avenue. The one-way street alignment ends at 11th Avenue South, but quickly begins again as US 30 / US 67 turn to the north onto northbound South Third Street and southbound South Fourth Street. At Eighth Avenue South, US 30 splits away from US 67 and onto the Gateway Bridge and crosses into Illinois.

== History ==
The path which US 30 follows has changed since it was originally planned as the Lincoln Highway in the early 1910s. The first path connected as many downtown areas as possible, in order to create awareness about the Good Roads Movement and the Lincoln Highway. As the primary highway system of Iowa matured, and the Lincoln Highway yielded to US 30, the highway was gradually straightened, leaving many towns off the route. More recently, new construction has routed traffic away from the straighter roads and onto sections of freeway and expressway.

=== Lincoln Highway ===
Lincoln Highway
- Location: Council Bluffs–Clinton
- Length: 358 mi (576 km)
- Existed: 1913–1928

US 30 was created with the U.S. Highway System in 1926, but the route it takes dates back to 1913, when the Lincoln Highway Association (LHA) designated the route across the country. The brainchild of Carl Fisher, the Lincoln Highway was the first highway to cross the United States, connecting New York City to San Francisco. In Iowa, it was uncertain exactly where the Lincoln Highway would run. As of August 1913, no definite route had been planned; the only certainty was the route would pass through Iowa. Iowans raised over $5 million (equivalent to $116 million in 2024 dollars) for the construction of the road. On September 14, 1913, the Lincoln Highway Association announced the route. It was 358 miles (576 km) of dirt roads, connecting Clinton, DeWitt, Cedar Rapids, Tama, Marshalltown, Ames, Jefferson, Denison, Logan, and Council Bluffs. The route was marked by a red, white, and blue tricolor emblazoned with an L. The route markers were painted upon telephone poles, bridges, and nearby buildings to show travelers the way.

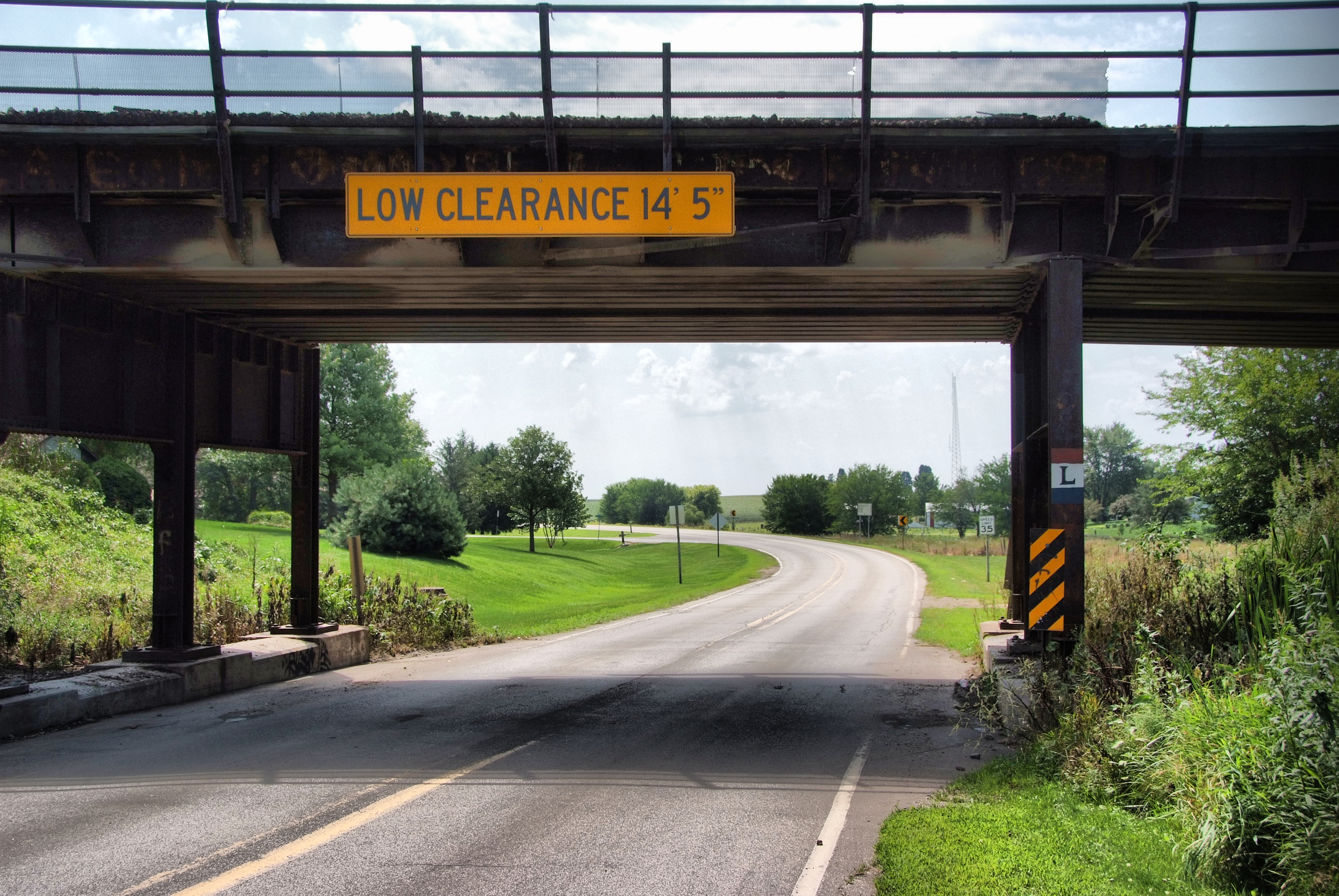
The Lincoln Highway passes beneath a Union Pacific Railroad bridge in State Center with the "L" logo painted on the bridge support.

While not ideal for transcontinental travel, Iowa's dirt roads were of high quality. Foreigners even compared them to the best roads in France. However, the same could not be said when they were wet. The mud was so thick and viscous it was nicknamed "gumbo". To show travelers the obvious benefits of paved roads, the Lincoln Highway Association began the process of creating seedling miles of paved roads. The idea, according to Henry B. Joy, then-president of the Lincoln Highway Association, was to show travelers, for one mile (1.6 km), how fast and smooth their trip could be, only to bring them back to reality at the end of the mile. Seedling miles were placed at least six miles (9.7 km) from the nearest town and in areas where the terrain was rough. Between August 1918 and June 1919, Iowa's first seedling mile was built in Linn County, west of Mount Vernon. The ribbon of concrete, which was 16 feet (4.9 m) wide, 7 1/2 inches (19 cm) thick, and crowned for drainage 1 1/2 inches (3.8 cm), cost nearly $35,000 (equivalent to $472,000 in 2024 dollars) to build.

Despite the success of the seedling miles across the country, Iowa lagged behind other states in improving its roads. Before 1924, Iowa's 99 counties, not the state highway commission, were responsible for the construction and maintenance of the state's roads. In the 1920s, road paving cost $30,000 per mile ($19,000/km), equivalent to $698,000 per mile ($434,000/km) in 2024 dollars; a major obstacle for county boards of supervisors that wanted to pave their roads. When counties could afford to build roads, the Iowa State Highway Commission required extensive grading to be performed before paving could occur. In 1922, only five percent of Iowa's roads, 334 miles (538 km), were paved. By 1924, twenty percent of the Lincoln Highway in Iowa had been paved, and by 1931, it was paved continuously from New York City to Missouri Valley, Iowa.

=== 1930s–1950s ===
Historical US 30 route markers

1926 design

1948 design used at intersections

1961 design

When the Lincoln Highway became U.S. Highway 30 in 1926, the route was 358 miles (576 km) long and passed through every town along the way. Starting in the 1930s, the route's alignment began to be straightened. By the mid-1930s, it was routed west of Missouri Valley on old Iowa 130. The US 30 alignment south of Missouri Valley became U.S. Highway 30 Alternate. By 1952, it had moved south of Marshalltown and was replaced by Iowa 330 and a seventeen-mile (27 km) southern jaunt through Belle Plaine had been replaced by a straight road. In 1955, a couple of routing changes occurred. In Cedar Rapids, it began its move to the south, avoiding the downtown area, and in Clinton, it was rerouted over the Gateway Bridge, allowing Iowa 136 to cross the Lyons-Fulton Bridge. However, by 1957, the old alignment through Clinton and across the Lyons-Fulton Bridge was numbered U.S. Highway 30 Alternate.

=== 1960s–1980s ===
In the 1960–1970s, Iowa DOT started to build freeway segments along US 30. In 1965, it was straightened and rerouted to the south of Ogden and Boone along an eleven-mile (18 km), four-lane stretch of road. By the end of the 1960s, both of the alternate routes had been turned over to local jurisdictions. The western route became Iowa 183, and the eastern route reverted to Iowa 136. By 1973, that new stretch of road had been extended fourteen miles (23 km) along a four-lane bypass around Ames. The old alignment became Iowa 930. In eastern Iowa, a new, twenty-mile-long (32 km) freeway connected DeWitt and Clinton by 1976. By 1985, the bypass of Cedar Rapids had been completed from 16th Avenue SW to Iowa 13 near Bertram. The bypass was extended five miles (8 km) further west in 1989. Between 1996 and 2000, an $8.2-million extension (equivalent to $15.1 million in 2024 dollars) was built to connect the bypass to the western intersection of US 218.

Since the Cedar Rapids bypass was completed in 1985, on occasion, traffic has had to be rerouted off of US 30. The bypass's proximity to the Union Pacific Railroad mainline resulted in an elevated roadway between Edgewood Road and Sixth Street SW. When strong winds come from the south, fog produced by an Archer Daniels Midland plant adjacent to the highway billows over the road making driving dangerous. The Iowa DOT set up an emergency detour from Edgewood Road SW north to 16th Avenue SW east to 6th Street SW back to US 30. The frequency of fog-related detours has decreased in recent years due to improved technology and the plant's expansion and relocation of cooling towers away from the highway.

=== 1990s to the present ===
The 1990s saw more construction of four-lane roads along US 30. Stretches of four-lane roads that had already been constructed were extended towards other communities. In Story County, it was widened to four lanes from the I-35 interchange to US 65 at Colo. The original 1950s-era bypass of Marshalltown was itself bypassed in 1997 by a freeway three-quarters mile (1.2 km) south of the original bypass. That road, Iowa Avenue in Marshalltown, was designated as U.S. Route 30 Business, the first business route along US 30 in Iowa. The four-lane stretch southeast of Cedar Rapids was extended another five miles (8.0 km) to a point two miles (3.2 km) west of Mount Vernon, costing $5.6 million (equivalent to $10.3 million in 2024 dollars) to build.

Since the beginning of the 21st century, Iowa DOT has continued to widen US 30 to four lanes. In 2004, an $18.6-million (equivalent to $34.2 million in 2024 dollars), four-lane section opened from east of Marshalltown to the Meskwaki Settlement west of Tama, bypassing Le Grand. In 2010, two sections of expressway were completed. A seven-and-a-half-mile-long (12 km) section from Colo to State Center opened to westbound travelers on November 29, while the eastbound lanes opened a week later. The seven-and-a-half-mile-long (12 km) section, which bypasses the Tama/Toledo area, opened in two segments. The first of which opened on November 1, and the second on November 25. On July 7, 2011, a section from State Center to Iowa 330 opened in Marshall County. On November 22, 2019, an eight-mile (13 km) extension opened, bypassing Mt. Vernon and Lisbon. In June 2021, a nine-mile-long (14 km) segment opened in Tama County.

=== Legacy of the Lincoln Highway ===
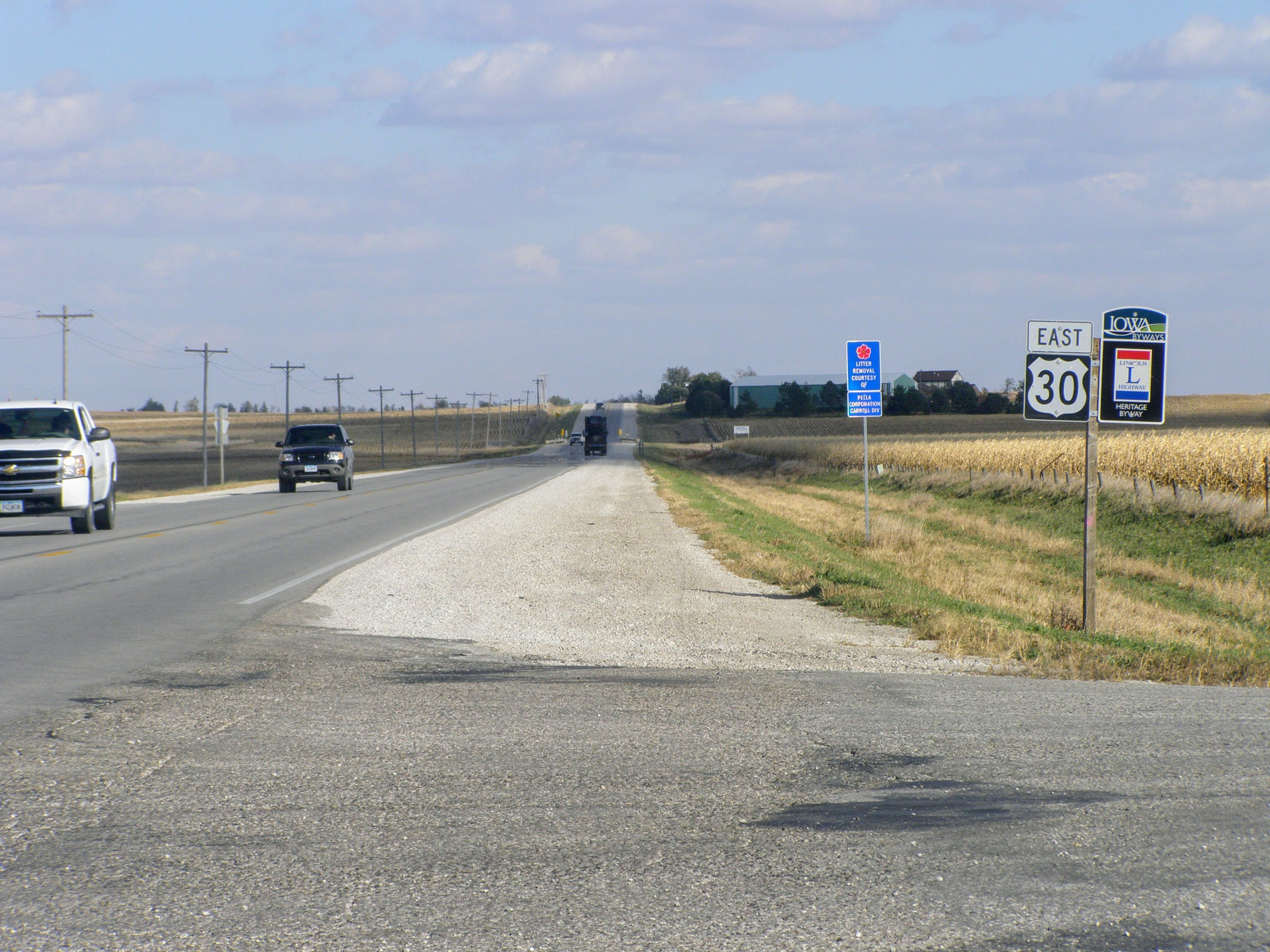
New Iowa Heritage Byway signage along US 30 near Denison

While the Lincoln Highway has not been an official route since 1926, it is still a source of pride in the communities and regions through which it passed. Nearly 85 percent of the original Lincoln Highway is still drivable, although much is gravel. Most of what is drivable is either along US 30 or within one mile (1.6 km). The Lincoln Highway bridge in Tama was built in 1915. It was restored in the 1980s after local officials feared losing the then-deteriorating bridge. Preston's Service Station, a landmark of Belle Plaine, has become a Lincoln Highway museum. Monuments were built along the route to honor not only Abraham Lincoln, but to honor Iowans who were influential for planning its route.

In 1992, the Lincoln Highway Association was reformed with a chapter in each state through which the highway passed. The new LHA is a historical preservation group that wants to preserve the remaining sections of the highway. The Iowa chapter of the LHA has, since 2008, sponsored a tour of the Lincoln Highway. To keep friendly to classic cars, the tour does not travel upon the sections of the road which are gravel. After years of lobbying by the LHA, the Iowa Department of Transportation, in 2006, designated the Lincoln Highway the first Iowa Heritage Byway. The 2010 Transportation Map of Iowa showed the path designated as the Iowa Heritage Byway for the first time.

== Major intersections ==
County	Location	mi	km	Exit	Destinations	Notes
Missouri River		0.000	0.000		US 30 west / Lincoln Highway – Blair	Continuation into Nebraska
Missouri River		0.000	0.000		Blair Bridge; Nebraska–Iowa state line	
Harrison	Missouri Valley	9.246	14.880		I-29 – Council Bluffs, Sioux City	I-29 exit 75
Harrison	Missouri Valley	10.617	17.086		N. 1st Street	Former Iowa 183, US 75
Harrison	Missouri Valley	10.978	17.667		Lincoln Highway Heritage Byway (S. 6th Street)	Former US 30, Iowa 183, and US 75
Harrison	Logan	19.291	31.046		Iowa 127 west – Magnolia, Mondamin	
Harrison	Jefferson Township	23.178	37.301		Iowa 44 east – Portsmouth	
Harrison	Dunlap	37.754	60.759		Iowa 37 east – Earling	Western end of Iowa 37 overlap
Harrison	Dunlap	37.989	61.137		Iowa 37 west – Soldier	Eastern end of Iowa 37 overlap
Crawford	Denison	51.145	82.310		US 59 south / Iowa 141 east – Harlan	Western end of US 59 / Iowa 141 overlap
Crawford	Denison	54.547	87.785		US 59 north / Iowa 141 west to Iowa 39 – Ida Grove	Eastern end of US 59 / Iowa 141 overlap
Carroll	Arcadia	72.723	117.036		CR M68 – Arcadia	Former Iowa 285
Carroll	Carroll	81.366	130.946		US 71 – Lake View, Audubon	
Carroll	Glidden	89.449	143.954		CR N41 north / CR N44 south – Lanesboro, Lake City, Coon Rapids	Former Iowa 286
Carroll	Glidden Township	93.442	150.380		Lincoln Highway Heritage Byway east	Former US 30
Greene	Ralston	95.117	153.076		Lincoln Highway Heritage Byway	Former US 30
Greene	Kendrick–Scranton township line	99.237	159.706		Iowa 25 south / Lincoln Highway Heritage Byway – Scranton	Former US 30
Greene	Jefferson	108.198	174.128		Iowa 4 – Jefferson, Churdan	
Greene	Grand Junction	115.242	185.464		Iowa 144 – Rippey, Paton	
Greene	Grand Junction	117.003	188.298		Lincoln Highway Heritage Byway west / CR E53	Former US 30
Boone	Amaqua–Beaver township line	122.260	196.758		US 169 north – Fort Dodge	Western end of US 169 overlap
Boone	Ogden	125.294	201.641		Lincoln Highway Heritage Byway east – Ogden	Former US 30
Boone	Ogden	126.356	203.350	126	US 169 south – Ogden, Adel	Eastern end of US 169 overlap
Boone	Boone	134.009	215.667		CR R23 / Story Street	Former Iowa 164
Boone	Des Moines–Worth township line	137.316	220.989	137	Iowa 17 – Madrid, Stanhope	
Boone	Colfax Township	138.298	222.569		Lincoln Highway Heritage Byway west	Former US 30
Boone	Colfax Township	141.790– 142.688	228.189– 229.634	142	Lincoln Way (Iowa 930) – Napier	
Story	Ames	144.885	233.170	144	CR R38 (South Dakota Avenue) – Kelley	
Story	Ames	147.003	236.578	146	University Boulevard – Iowa State University	
Story	Ames	148.524	239.026	148	I-35 Business Loop north / US 69 (Duff Avenue) – Huxley	Western end of I-35 Business overlap
Story	Ames	149.745	240.991	150	Dayton Avenue	
Story	Ames	150.534	242.261	151	I-35 / I-35 Business Loop ends – Des Moines, Minneapolis	I-35 exit 111; exits signed as 151A (south) and 151B (north); eastern end of I-35 Business overlap
Story	Grant Township	152.034	244.675	153	CR R70 (580th Avenue)	
Story	Nevada	156.620	252.055		S. 6th Street	Former Iowa 133
Story	Nevada	157.595	253.625	157	19th Street – Nevada	
Story	Colo	164.057	264.024	164	US 65 – Des Moines, Iowa Falls	
Marshall	State Center	171.479	275.969		Durham Avenue	Former Iowa 234
Marshall	Washington Township	179.938	289.582	179	Iowa 330 – Albion, Melbourne, Des Moines	Des Moines only signed westbound
Marshall	Timber Creek Township	180.641– 181.102	290.714– 291.455	181	US 30 Bus. east (Iowa Avenue)	Eastbound exit and westbound entrance only
Marshall	Timber Creek Township	182.023	292.938	182	Oaks Avenue, Highland Acres Road	Westbound exit and eastbound entrance only
Marshall	Marshalltown	184.531	296.974	185	Iowa 14 – Newton, Marshalltown Business District	
Marshall	Marshalltown	186.013	299.359	186	US 30 Bus. west (18th Avenue)	US 30 Business signed westbound only
Marshall	Le Grand Township	187.722	302.109		Lincoln Highway Heritage Byway west (Shady Oaks Road)	Former US 30
Marshall	Le Grand	191.182	307.678	192	Iowa 146 south / Lincoln Highway Heritage Byway east / CR T37 north – Le Grand, Grinnell	
Marshall	Le Grand	192.176	309.277		Main Street	Former US 30
Tama	Indian Village Township	194.125	312.414		CR T47 – Montour	Former Iowa 135
Tama	Toledo Township	199.950– 200.204	321.788– 322.197	—	US 30 Bus. – Toledo	Westbound exit and eastbound entrance only
Tama	Toledo	202.037	325.147	202	US 63 – Tama, Toledo	
Tama	Tama Township	204.223	328.665	204	US 30 Bus. west / Lincoln Highway Heritage Byway – Tama	US 30 Business only signed eastbound
Tama	Otter Creek Township	208.877	336.155		Lincoln Highway Heritage Byway east / CR E66 – Chelsea	Former US 30, Iowa 212
Tama–Benton county line	York–Kane township line	217.222	349.585	217	Iowa 21 – Belle Plaine, Dysart	Interchange opened on August 30, 2023
Benton	Kane Township	220.037	354.115		Lincoln Highway Heritage Byway west / CR V40 – Belle Plaine	Former US 30, Iowa 131
Benton	Kane Township	222.046	357.348		CR V42 – Keystone	Former Iowa 200
Benton	Union Township	228.036	366.988		CR V66 – Van Horne, Blairstown	Former Iowa 82
Benton	Eldorado Township	231.004	371.765	231	US 218 north – Vinton	Western end of US 218 overlap
Benton	Eldorado Township	239.956	386.172		CR W14 – Newhall	Former Iowa 287
Benton	Fremont Township	237.000	381.415		CR W24 – Norway	Former Iowa 201
Benton	Fremont Township	239.985	386.218		CR W28 – Atkins	Former Iowa 279
Linn	Clinton Township	243.114	391.254	246A	Iowa 100 east – Cedar Rapids, Marion	
Linn	Clinton Township	244.504	393.491	246B	80th Street SW to 16th Avenue SW – Fairfax	
Linn	Cedar Rapids	246.126	396.101	248	US 151 south / US 151 Bus. north (Williams Boulevard SW) – Amana Colonies	Western end of US 151 overlap; former Iowa 149
Linn	Cedar Rapids	247.619	398.504	250	Edgewood Road SW	
Linn	Cedar Rapids	249.683	401.826	252A	6th Street SW – Hawkeye Downs	Former US 218, US 30
Linn	Cedar Rapids	250.017	402.363	252; B–C	I-380 / US 218 south / Iowa 27 – Cedar Rapids, Iowa City, Airport	I-380 exit 16; eastern end of US 218 overlap
Linn	Cedar Rapids	250.694	403.453	253	Kirkwood Boulevard SW, Bowling Street SW	
Linn	Cedar Rapids	251.693	405.061	254	CR W6E (C Street SW) – Ely	Signed as exits 254A (south) and 254B (north) eastbound
Linn	Bertram Township	256.630	413.006	259	US 151 north / Iowa 13 north – Marion	Eastern end of US 151 overlap
Linn	Franklin Township	261.199	420.359		Business 30 SW	Former US 30
Linn	Mount Vernon	262.668	422.723	265	Iowa 1 – Mount Vernon, Solon, Cornell College, Historic Districts	Exit opened November 22, 2019
Linn–Cedar county line	Franklin–Pioneer township line	266.147	428.322	268	Lisbon	Exit opened November 22, 2019
Cedar	Stanwood	277.743	446.984		Iowa 38 north (Ash Street) – Olin	Western end of Iowa 38 overlap
Cedar	Fremont–Dayton township line	278.758	448.618		Iowa 38 south – Tipton	Eastern end of Iowa 38 overlap
Cedar	Clarence	282.745	455.034		Lincoln Highway Heritage Byway east / CR X64 to Iowa 130	Former US 30
Cedar	Massillon Township	287.121	462.076		Lincoln Highway Heritage Byway west	Former US 30
Cedar	Massillon Township	288.005	463.499		Lincoln Highway Heritage Byway east	Former US 30
Clinton	Spring Rock Township	297.105	478.144		Lincoln Highway Heritage Byway west	Former US 30
Clinton	DeWitt	308.348– 308.885	496.238– 497.102	311	US 61 north – Maquoketa Lincoln Highway Heritage Byway east – DeWitt	Western end of US 61 overlap; former US 30
Clinton	DeWitt	309.759– 310.329	498.509– 499.426	312	US 61 south – Davenport	Eastern end of US 61 overlap
Clinton	DeWitt	311.772	501.748	313	6th Avenue – DeWitt	Former US 61, Iowa 956
Clinton	De Witt–Eden township line	316.368	509.145		Lincoln Highway Heritage Byway west / CR Z24	Former US 30, Iowa 948
Clinton	Eden–Camanche township line	321.372	517.198	323	CR Z36 – Low Moor, Elvira	Former Iowa 391
Clinton	Clinton	327.177	526.540		US 67 south / Great River Road (Washington Boulevard) – Camanche	Western end of US 67 overlap; US 67 is the Great River Road
Clinton	Clinton	327.422	526.935		Lincoln Highway Heritage Byway (Harrison Drive)	Former US 30
Clinton	Clinton	330.164	531.347		US 30 west / US 67 south (S. 4th Street)	One-way couplet
Clinton	Clinton	330.465	531.832		US 67 north / Great River Road (S. 3rd Street) / 8th Avenue South	Eastern end of US 67 overlap
Mississippi River		330.856	532.461		Gateway Bridge; Iowa–Illinois state line	
Mississippi River		330.856	532.461		US 30 east – Morrison	Continuation into Illinois
1.000 mi = 1.609 km; 1.000 km = 0.621 mi: Concurrency terminus; Incomplete access

== See also ==
- Special routes of U.S. Route 30

U.S. Route 30
Previous state: Nebraska	Iowa	Next state: Illinois
