= Iowa Highway 37 =

State highway in Iowa, United States

Iowa Highway 37
- Iowa 37 highlighted in red

Route information
- Maintained by Iowa DOT
- Length: 40.231 mi (64.746 km)

Major junctions
- West end: Iowa 175 near Turin
- US 30 in Dunlap
- East end: US 59 near Earling

Location
- Country: United States
- State: Iowa
- Counties: Monona; Crawford; Harrison; Shelby

Highway system
- Iowa Primary Highway System; Interstate; US; State; Secondary; Scenic
← I-35	→ Iowa 38

Iowa Highway 37 (Iowa 37) is an east–west road in the west-central part of the state. Iowa 37 begins just east of Turin at Iowa Highway 175. It ends four miles (6.4 km) east of Earling at U.S. Highway 59. A small portion of the highway near Turin is designated as part of the Loess Hills Scenic Byway.

== Route description ==
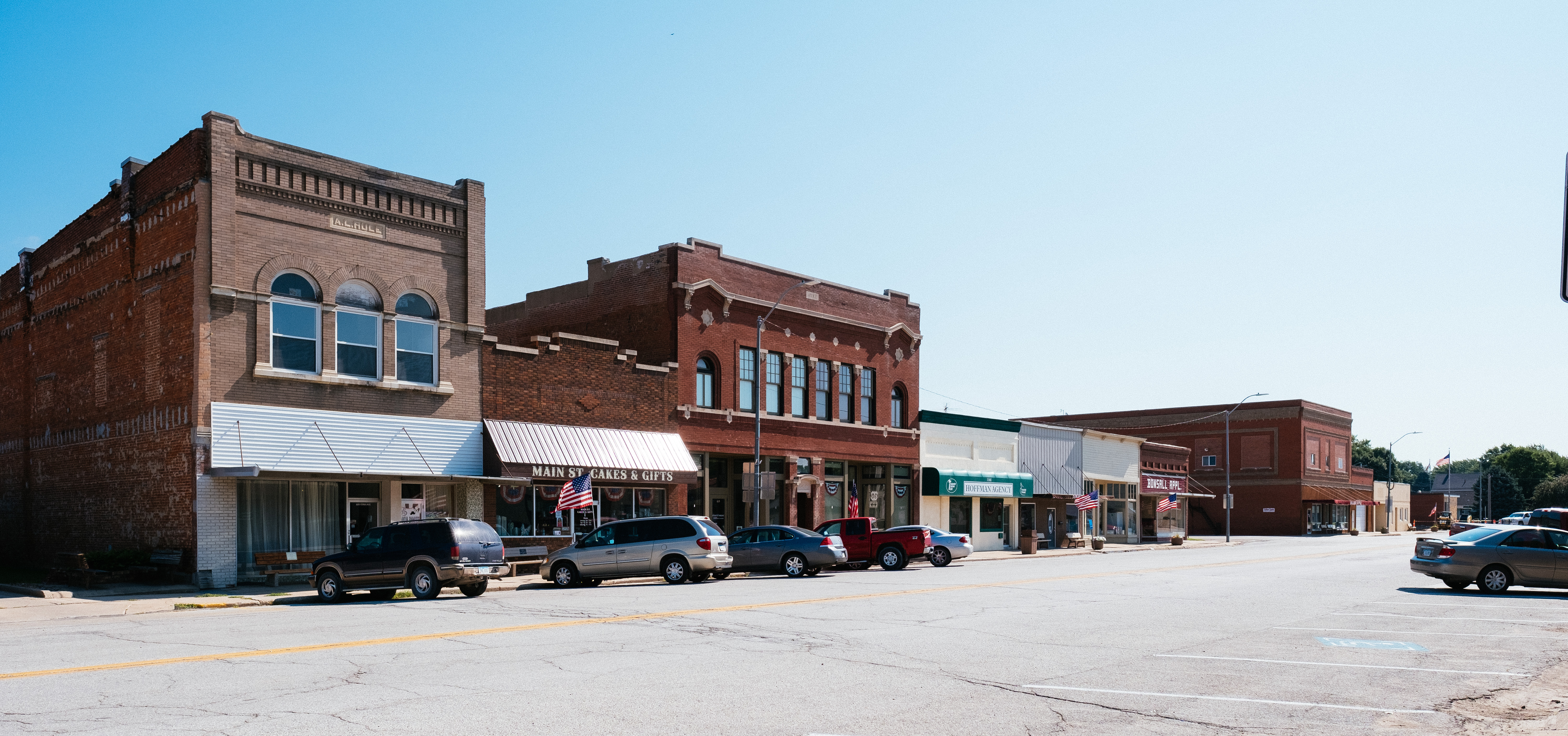
Iowa 37 as it passes through Dunlap

Iowa Highway 37 begins at an intersection with Iowa 175 east of Turin and adjacent to Iowa 175's crossing of the Maple River. The first one and a half miles (2.4 km) of the route are part of the Loess Hills Scenic Byway. The highway travels east and then southeast through the Loess Hills, a region of dunes east of the Missouri River created by wind-deposited silt from the Missouri River valley. At Soldier, Iowa 37 exits the Loess Hills and meets Iowa 183. From Soldier, the highway travels 13 miles (21 km) to the southeast to Dunlap. In Dunlap, Iowa 37 overlaps US 30 for one-quarter mile (400 m). Eastbound Iowa 37 overlaps westbound US 30; this phenomenon is known as a wrong-way concurrency. Between Dunlap and Earling, Iowa 37 travels in a stairstep path to the south and east for 13 miles (21 km). At Earling, the highway intersects the northern end of Iowa 191. Its last section is four miles (6.4 km) long, connecting Earling to US 59.

== History ==
Originally, Iowa Highway 37 began at US 75 in Onawa to US 59 east of Earling. The westernmost eight miles (13 km) of the route were overlapped by Iowa 175. In 1966, Iowa 37 was truncated to its current western end near the Maple River. In 1971, a new section of US 59 was opened one mile (1.6 km) to the west of the former alignment. As a result, Iowa 37 was extended one mile (1.6 km) north and six miles (9.7 km) east to Irwin, absorbing Iowa 268 The section from US 59 to Irwin was short-lived. In 1980, the section east of US 59 was turned over to Shelby County.

== Major intersections ==
County	Location	mi	km	Destinations	Notes
Monona	Belvidere Township	0.000	0.000	Iowa 175 – Onawa, Mapleton	
Monona	Soldier	10.044	16.164	Iowa 183 – Moorhead, Ute	
Crawford	No major junctions				
Harrison	Dunlap	23.102	37.179	US 30 east (6th Street) – Denison	Western end of US 30 overlap; wrong-way concurrency
Harrison	Dunlap	23.337	37.557	US 30 west (6th Street) – Woodbine	Eastern end of US 30 overlap
Shelby	Earling	36.148	58.175	Iowa 191 south – Panama	
Shelby	Westphalia–Union township line	40.231	64.746	US 59 – Harlan, Denison	
1.000 mi = 1.609 km; 1.000 km = 0.621 mi: Concurrency terminus
