= 2003 Iowa highway transfer of jurisdiction =

Iowa Primary Highway System
- Highways that changed jurisdiction in 2003

System information
- Notes: Primary highways in Iowa are generally state-maintained.

Highway names
- Interstates: Interstate X (I-X)
- US Highways: U.S. Highway X (US X)
- State: Highway X (IA X or Iowa X)

System links
- Iowa Primary Highway System; Interstate; US; State; Secondary; Scenic

On July 1, 2003, the Iowa Department of Transportation transferred control of more than 700 miles (1,100 km) of highway to county and local governments in order to save money and to increase operational efficiency. Most of the highways turned over were short spurs connecting small, rural communities and state parks to the highway system.

== Background ==
Starting in 1979, staff members with the Iowa Department of Transportation (DOT) along with county and municipal officials began to reclassify every mile of Iowa's 113,000-mile (182,000 km) public road system. These classification boards found that on the 10,000 highway miles (16,000 km) in the primary system, which comprises Interstate Highways, U.S. Highways, and state highways, nearly 1,000 miles (1,600 km) were minor highways that primarily served local traffic. Conversely, they found 400 miles (640 km) of major highways that were on the secondary system, which is made up of all rural roads not on the primary highway system. At the time, the Iowa Code provided a mechanism for the transfer of jurisdiction of roads within the state. The two sides would meet and if it was deemed that the road in question needed repairs, the relinquishing body would either make repairs or pay the accepting body the money needed to repair the roadway.

Most of the time, the DOT was able to come to an agreement with the county board of supervisors as 600 miles (970 km) of Iowa roads changed hands in the early 1980s. Some counties and the state could never come to an agreement, as was the case in Johnson County regarding Iowa Highway 979 (Iowa 979). The DOT wanted Johnson County to take over maintenance of the 6-mile-long (9.7 km) road and offered $160,000 to repair the road (equivalent to $400,000 in 2023), while the county wanted the state to take over another road. Both sides reached an impasse. Ultimately, Iowa 979 stayed under DOT control. During the 1990s, Iowa experienced a boom in highway construction bolstered by state appropriations from the National Highway System Designation Act of 1995. New four-lane highways were built all across the state, either by twinning an existing roadway or building new alignments in proximity to the old roads. After opening the new roads, these short segments often stayed on the primary highway system despite not serving an arterial purpose.

In 2002, the Road Use Tax Fund Committee, a mix of city, county, and state transportation officials, met to review and recommend changes to Iowa's public road system. The report was necessitated by increasing costs to maintain the highway system and a level of funding that was not keeping up with the rising costs. The committee identified over 700 miles (1,100 km) of state highways which could be turned over to local jurisdictions. Not wanting to repeat the impasses of the 1980s, the DOT got help from state legislature. The general assembly passed SF 451, which gave the DOT a one-time exemption from §306.8, which required the DOT to otherwise compensate a county for giving control of a road. Any roads identified by the Road Use Tax Fund Committee for which a transfer agreement pursuant to §306.8 had not been reached prior to July 1, 2003, would be summarily given to the respective counties without compensation. Even more, counties could not figure any roads offloaded to counties through this mechanism into the calculations for determining their road maintenance budgets for ten years.

Some counties were proactive with negotiating with the state. Early in 2003, it was not clear to county officials just how much money would be given to the counties for accepting roads from the state. This made the counties more amenable to accepting money for highways than in previous years. Taylor County officials negotiated a $4.7 million transfer (equivalent to $7.46 million in 2023) of Iowa 49 with the DOT, while Adams County officials did not. The DOT paid out $35 million (equivalent to $55.6 million in 2023) to counties before the July 1, 2003, deadline.

== Routes affected ==
Number	Length (mi) (Note: Lengths represent the length of highway removed from the primary highway system on or before July 1, 2003.)	Length (km)	Southern or western terminus	Northern or eastern terminus	Formed	Removed	Notes
US 6	14.842	23.886	I-80 near Dexter	US 169 in Adel	1931	current	Rerouted over I-80 and US 169
Iowa 15	4.655	7.491	Route 15 south of Milton	Iowa 2 at Milton	1969	2003	
Iowa 36	2.983	4.801	Wall Lake	US 71 / Iowa 175 at Wall Lake	1920	2003	
Iowa 40	3.524	5.671	Allerton	Iowa 2 near Corydon	1926	2003	
Iowa 41	1.827	2.940	Malvern	US 34 near Malvern	1920	2003	
Iowa 45	1.324	2.131	Manilla	Iowa 141 near Manilla	1920	2003	
Iowa 49	27.228	43.819	Iowa 2 at Bedford	US 34 near Lenox	1920	2003	
Iowa 50	7.135	11.483	US 169 near Fort Dodge	Lehigh	1920	2003	
Iowa 55	4.506	7.252	Seymour	Iowa 2 east of Promise City	1934	2003	
Iowa 66	7.011	11.283	Iowa 2 near Benton	Diagonal	—	2003	
Iowa 68	1.933	3.111	Melrose	US 34 near Melrose	—	2003	
Iowa 77	2.685	4.321	Iowa 92 near Keota	Keota	—	2003	
Iowa 79	5.637	9.072	Geode State Park	US 34 in Middletown	1980	2003	
Iowa 82	3.773	6.072	Blairsburg	US 30 near Blairsburg	1920	2003	
Iowa 83	14.562	23.435	Iowa 191 at Neola	US 59 in Avoca	—	—	Remainder of route unchanged
Iowa 91	4.643	7.472	Iowa 9 near Little Rock	MN 91 near Ellsworth, Minn.	1980	2003	
Iowa 94	11.168	17.973	Palo	US 151 Business in Cedar Rapids	1966	2003	
Iowa 97	1.532	2.466	Russell	US 34 near Russell	—	2003	
Iowa 99	33.232	53.482	US 34 in Burlington	US 61in Wapello	1931	2003	
Iowa 102	15.401	24.786	Iowa 163 at Pella	New Sharon city limits	1980	2003	Section within New Sharon limits remains
Iowa 103	27.579	44.384	US 218 / Iowa 27 near West Point	US 61 / Iowa 2 in Fort Madison	—	2003	
Iowa 107	27.579	44.384	Iowa 3 near Alexander	US 18 in Clear Lake	1920	2011	Portions within Meservey and Thornton remained
Iowa 109	1.268	2.041	Oxford	US 6 near Oxford	—	2003	
Iowa 113	1.187	1.910	Iowa 64 near Preston	Spragueville	1938	2003	Previous extended to Iowa 62
Iowa 115	1.237	1.991	Viking Lake State Park	US 34 near Stanton	1980	2003	
Iowa 124	2.567	4.131	Iowa 4	Twin Lakes State Park	1924	2003	
Iowa 131	4.520	7.274	Iowa 21 in Belle Plaine	US 30 near Belle Plaine	—	2003	Section of Lincoln Highway
Iowa 133	0.970	1.561	US 30 at Nevada	Nevada	1963	2003	
Iowa 142	20.901	33.637	Iowa 2 at Plano	Iowa 5 at Moravia	1980	2003	
Iowa 145	7.408	11.922	I-29 near Thurman	US 275 near Sidney	1931	2003	
Iowa 147	6.706	10.792	Rockford	Iowa 14 near Roseville	—	2003	
Iowa 156	4.478	7.207	Iowa 5 near Attica	Bussey	—	2003	
Iowa 157	1.032	1.661	US 63 near Lime Springs	Lime Springs	—	2003	
Iowa 161	1.224	1.970	Iowa 141 west of Dedham	Iowa 141 south of Dedham	—	2003	
Iowa 181	9.596	15.443	Melcher-Dallas	Iowa 5 / Iowa 92 near Pleasantville	—	2003	
Iowa 183	31.143	50.120	US 6 in Council Bluffs	Iowa 127 near Mondamin	1930	current	Remainder of route unchanged
Iowa 191	18.334	29.506	US 6 at Council Bluffs	I-680 near Neola	1930	current	Remainder of route unchanged
Iowa 193	10.852	17.465	US 18 near Alpha	Iowa 24 at Jackson Junction	—	2003	
Iowa 195	2.896	4.661	Iowa 4 near Plover	Plover	—	2003	
Iowa 197	2.567	4.131	Iowa 3 near Albert City	Albert City	—	2003	
Iowa 198	2.231	3.590	Garrison	US 218 near Garrison, Iowa	—	2003	
Iowa 199	2.666	4.291	US 30 near Van Horne	Van Horne	—	2003	
Iowa 200	2.163	3.481	US 30 near Keystone	Keystone	—	2003	
Iowa 201	4.755	7.652	Norway	US 30 near Norway	—	2003	
Iowa 204	5.407	8.702	Iowa 2 near Leon	Garden Grove	—	2003	
Iowa 205	2.927	4.711	US 65 near Milo	Milo	—	2003	
Iowa 206	6.221	10.012	US 65 near Liberty Center	Lacona	—	2003	
Iowa 207	3.058	4.921	I-35 near New Virginia	New Virginia	—	2003	
Iowa 214	5.736	9.231	Iowa 175 near Ivester	Wellsburg	—	2003	
Iowa 215	8.738	14.062	Union	Iowa 175 at Eldora	—	2003	
Iowa 221	3.909	6.291	I-35 near Story City	Roland	—	2003	
Iowa 225	7.688	12.373	Sully	Iowa 146 at Searsboro	—	2003	
Iowa 229	5.233	8.422	Garwin	US 63 near Garwin	—	2003	
Iowa 231	4.068	6.547	US 34 west of New London	US 34 east of New London	—	2003	
Iowa 238	1.063	1.711	Iowa 9 near Harris	Harris	—	2003	
Iowa 239	0.510	0.821	Waubonsie State Park	Iowa 2 near Sidney	1931	2003	
Iowa 240	6.389	10.282	Royal	US 71 near Greenville	—	2003	
Iowa 242	5.855	9.423	US 34 near Glenwood	Silver City	—	2003	
Iowa 243	0.559	0.900	Black Hawk Lake State Park	US 71 / Iowa 175 near Lake Park	1980	2003	
Iowa 244	0.771	1.241	I-80 near Neola	Iowa 191 in Neola	1980	2003	
Iowa 249	0.665	1.070	Iowa 78 near Winfield	Winfield	—	2003	
Iowa 252	0.584	0.940	US 61 / Iowa 92 at Grandview	Grandview	—	2003	
Iowa 253	0.932	1.500	Iowa 14 near Williamson	Williamson	—	2003	
Iowa 258	1.989	3.201	I-35 at Van Wert	US 69 near Van Wert	—	2003	
Iowa 259	1.001	1.611	US 169 near Tingley	Tingley	—	2003	
Iowa 263	12.511	20.135	US 20 / Iowa 14 near Dike	US 20 near Cedar Falls	—	2003	
Iowa 266	1.709	2.750	US 69 near Weldon	Weldon	—	2003	
Iowa 273	10.025	16.134	Lake Wapello State Park	US 63 near Bloomfield	—	2003	
US 275	15.506	24.954	US 34 in Glenwood	Iowa 92 at Council Bluffs	1932	current	Remainder of route unchanged
Iowa 276	4.711	7.582	Iowa 327 in Spirit Lake	Minnesota state line near Mini-Wakan State Park	—	2003	
Iowa 279	1.983	3.191	US 30 near Atkins	Atkins	—	2003	
Iowa 282	5.283	8.502	Quasqueton	Iowa 939 near Winthrop	—	2003	
Iowa 283	5.861	9.432	Brandon	Iowa 150 near Brandon	—	2003	
Iowa 285	0.796	1.281	US 30 near Arcadia	Arcadia	—	2003	
Iowa 286	9.932	15.984	US 30 at Glidden	Lanesboro	—	2003	
Iowa 287	1.833	2.950	US 30 near Newhall	Newhall	—	2003	
Iowa 294	6.147	9.893	Iowa 2 near Kellerton	Grand River	—	2003	
Iowa 297	3.543	5.702	Gilbertville	Raymond	—	2003	
Iowa 299	5.556	8.942	New Providence	Iowa 175 near Eldora	—	2003	
Iowa 300	1.411	2.271	Modale	I-29 near Modale	—	2003	
Iowa 301	2.045	3.291	I-29	Little Sioux	—	2003	
Iowa 305	2.554	4.110	Letts	US 61 / Iowa 92 near Letts	—	2003	
Iowa 306	0.783	1.260	US 65 near Derby	Derby	—	2003	
Iowa 314	6.277	10.102	Ayrshire	US 18 near Ruthven	—	2003	
Iowa 315	4.158	6.692	Iowa 4 near Palmer	Palmer	—	2003	
Iowa 322	2.660	4.281	Pammel State Park	Iowa 92	—	2003	
Iowa 324	0.510	0.821	Iowa 175 near Onawa	Lewis and Clark State Park	—	2003	
Iowa 325	—	—	Spillville	US 52 near Calmar	—	2003	
Iowa 327	—	—	Iowa 276 in Spirit Lake	Orleans	—	2003	
Iowa 333	12.939	20.823	US 275 in Hamburg	US 59 near Shenandoah	—	—	Remainder of route unchanged
Iowa 340	2.231	3.590	Pikes Peak State Park	US 18 Business in McGregor	1936	2003	
Iowa 349	1.032	1.661	Lake Ahquabi State Park	US 65 / US 69 near Indianola	—	2003	
Iowa 359	7.383	11.882	Buckeye	Iowa 941 at Alden	—	2003	
Iowa 362	5.469	8.802	DeSoto National Wildlife Refuge	I-29 near Loveland	—	2003	
Iowa 363	1.616	2.601	Iowa 150 near Urbana	I-380 at Urbana	—	2003	
Iowa 364	6.140	9.881	Iowa 76 near Waukon Junction	Harpers Ferry	—	2003	
Iowa 371	0.715	1.151	Lake Keomah State Park	Iowa 92 near Keomah Village	—	2003	
Iowa 382	4.792	7.712	Lake Macbride State Park	Iowa 1 in Solon	—	2003	
Iowa 383	1.311	2.110	US 69 near Randall	Randall	—	2003	
Iowa 384	1.231	1.981	Iowa 25 near Guthrie Center	Springbrook State Park	1944	2003	
Iowa 385	3.151	5.071	Pacific Junction	US 34 / US 275 in Glenwood	—	2003	
Iowa 386	2.685	4.321	US 52 / Iowa 3 / Iowa 32 at Sageville	US 52 / Iowa 3 at Sageville	1945	2003	
Iowa 390	2.113	3.401	South of Plainfield	North of Plainfield	2002	2003	Former section of US 218
Iowa 403	0.477	0.768	SD 48 near Akron	Iowa 12 in Akron	1980	2003	
Iowa 404	1.391	2.239	Montrose	US 61 near Montrose	1960	2003	Spur route
Iowa 405	0.249	0.401	Lone Tree	Iowa 22 near Lone Tree	1958	2003	Spur route; section in Lone Tree removed 1980
Iowa 406	2.275	3.661	US 34 near West Burlington	Burlington	1957	2003	Formerly Iowa 80; spur route
Iowa 410	2.157	3.471	Backbone State Park	Iowa 3 / Iowa 13 near Strawberry Point	1958	2003	Park access road
Iowa 419	1.038	1.670	Victor	US 6 / Iowa 21 near Victor	1962	2003	Spur route
Iowa 421	3.260	5.246	US 61 west of Blue Grass	US 61 east of Blue Grass	2000	2003	Former section of US 61 at Blue Grass
Iowa 424	2.802	4.509	South of Swedesburg	US 218 near Olds	1999	2003	Former section of US 218
Iowa 428	6.140	9.881	Maquoketa Caves State Park	US 61 near Maquoketa	1980	2003	Park access road
Iowa 432	1.9	3.1	Iowa 163 in Oskaloosa	Iowa 92 in Oskaloosa	1998	2003	Former section of Iowa 163
Iowa 478	0.755	1.215	Iowa 24 in New Hampton	North of New Hampton	2002	2003	Former section of US 63
Iowa 916	1.293	2.081	Iowa 281 in Oelwein	Oelwein city limits	1986	2003	Originally ended at Iowa 915 in Oelwein; former section of Iowa 150
Iowa 917	0.149	0.240	US 61 and Iowa 22 near Muscatine	Muscatine city limits	1986	2003	Former section of Iowa 22
Iowa 918	1.119	1.801	Iowa 16 near Eldon	Iowa 16 in Eldon	1984	2003	Former section of Iowa 16; street signs said "Hwy 918"
Iowa 920	12.560	20.213	Center Point	Iowa 150 near Urbana	1984	2003	Former section of Iowa 150
Iowa 921	2.505	4.031	US 6 / Iowa 1 in Iowa City	US 218 in Iowa City	1985	2003	Former section of US 218
Iowa 923	8.819	14.193	—	—	1982	2003	Former section of US 218; had three sections
Iowa 924	0.665	1.070	US 61 near Montrose	Dead end in Montrose	1994	2003	Formerly Iowa 998; former section of US 61
Iowa 925	26.259	42.260	I-80 / US 6 in Adair	US 6 near Dexter	1980	2003	Former section of US 6
Iowa 927	19.017	30.605	US 6 / Iowa 38 in Wilton	I-280 / US 6 near Davenport	1980	2003	Former section of US 6; was signed in 1989
Iowa 928	20.168	32.457	Iowa 17 near Webster City	CR D20 near Williams	1980	2003	Former section of US 20
Iowa 929	0.789	1.270	Murray city limits	Maple Street in Murray	1980	2003	Former section of Iowa 152
Iowa 931	8.962	14.423	I-35 in Ankeny	US 65 in Polk County	1980	2003	
Iowa 932	0.193	0.311	Ryan city limits	Iowa 13 in Ryan	1976	2003	Former section of Iowa 13
Iowa 935	1.492	2.401	I-29	Mills–Pottawattamie county line	1982	2003	Former section of Iowa 370
Iowa 936	0.275	0.443	Iowa 92 near Ainsworth	Iowa 923 near Ainsworth	1997	2003	Former section of Iowa 92
Iowa 937	0.460	0.740	Iowa 141 near Perry	US 169 near Perry	1977	2003	Former section of Iowa 141
Iowa 938	0.460	0.740	Union Street in Unionville	Unionville south city limit boundary	1980	2003	Former section of Iowa 369
Iowa 939	18.931	30.466	Iowa 187 near Masonville	Black Hawk–Buchanan county line	1980	2003	Former section of US 20
Iowa 940	0.081	0.130	Tama–Benton county line near Belle Plaine	Iowa 21 near Belle Plaine	1981	2003	
Iowa 941	12.953	20.846	I-35 near Williams	Iowa Falls city limits	1991	2003	Former section of US 20
Iowa 942	0.466	0.750	Vine Street in Woodburn	Woodburn city limits	1980	2003	Former section of Iowa 104
Iowa 944	0.553	0.890	US 61 / Iowa 2 in Fort Madison	Fort Madison city limits	1980	2003	Former section of Iowa 88
Iowa 945	4.599	7.401	I-80 near Altoona	Iowa 931 in Polk County	1980	2003	
Iowa 947	0.671	1.080	Iowa 70 in Columbus Junction	Market Street in Columbus City	1994	2003	Former section of Iowa 70
Iowa 949	2.275	3.661	Glenwood city limits	US 34 / US 275 near Glenwood	1974	2003	Formerly US 34 Business
Iowa 952	0.112	0.180	US 151 near Cascade	Reiter Road near Cascade	1992	2003	Former section of US 151
Iowa 954	0.773	1.244	US 61 near Maquoketa	Maquoketa city limits	1967	2003	Former section of US 61; numbered 1976
Iowa 955	0.727	1.170	US 61 near Key West	Iowa 963 (Military Road) in Key West	1971	2003	Former section of US 61
Iowa 956	16.776	26.998	CR F55 at Davenport	US 61 north of DeWitt	1976	2003	Former section of US 61
Iowa 957	0.062	0.100	—	—	1988	2003	Former section of Iowa 22
Iowa 958	1.610	2.591	Ottumwa city limits	US 63 south of Ottumwa	1965	2003	Former section of US 63
Iowa 963	4.139	6.661	US 151 near Key West	US 61 / US 151 in Dubuque	1971	2003	Former section of US 151 and US 61
Iowa 967	0.037	0.060	US 20 near Farley	Farley city limits	1976	2003	Former section of US 20
Iowa 970	0.31	0.50	US 75 Business in Sioux City	Sioux City	1976	2003	Former section of US 75
Iowa 971	1.802	2.900	US 69 in Lake Mills	Lake Mills city limits	1993	2003	Former section of Iowa 105
Iowa 972	1.877	3.021	Northwood city limits	Northwood city limits	1993	2003	Former section of Iowa 105
Iowa 976	0.879	1.415	—	—	1997	2003	Former section of US 30
Iowa 977	2.007	3.230	US 59 in Cherokee	Iowa 3 near Cherokee	1962	2003	Former section of Iowa 3
Iowa 978	2.772	4.461	I-29 / US 34 near Glenwood	Iowa 385 near Pacific Junction	1974	2003	Former section of US 34
Iowa 979	4.298	6.917	Iowa City limits	Johnson–Cedar county line	1961	2003	Former section of Iowa 1
Iowa 982	27.787	44.719	Smithland city limits	Sioux City city limits	1967	2003	Former section of Iowa 141
Iowa 985	1.927	3.101	US 52 near Bellevue State Park	US 52 near Bellevue	1980	2003	Former section of US 52
Iowa 988	2.312	3.721	I-29 / I-680 near Crescent	Iowa 183 in Crescent	1975	2003	
Former
