= Mondamin =

Mondamin may refer to:

- Mondamin (deity), one of the First Nations' maize deities
- Mondamin, Iowa
- Mondamin Township, South Dakota, in Hand County, South Dakota
- Mondamin (crater), a crater on Ceres in the southern part of the dwarf planet
- USS Mondamin (1864), a United States Navy sloop-of-war or frigate slated to be built late in the American Civil War (1861-1865) but cancelled prior to construction
