= Iowa Highway 127 =

State highway in Iowa, United States

Iowa Highway 127
- Iowa 127 highlighted in red

Route information
- Maintained by Iowa DOT
- Length: 15.985 mi (25.725 km)

Major junctions
- West end: I-29 west of Mondamin
- Iowa 183 east of Mondamin
- East end: US 30 at Logan

Location
- Country: United States
- State: Iowa
- Counties: Harrison

Highway system
- Iowa Primary Highway System; Interstate; US; State; Secondary; Scenic
← Iowa 122	→ Iowa 128

Iowa Highway 127 (Iowa 127) is an east–west highway in Harrison County. It begins at Interstate 29 near Mondamin and ends in Logan at U.S. Highway 30 (US 30). The highway is nearly 16 miles (26 km) long.

== Route description ==
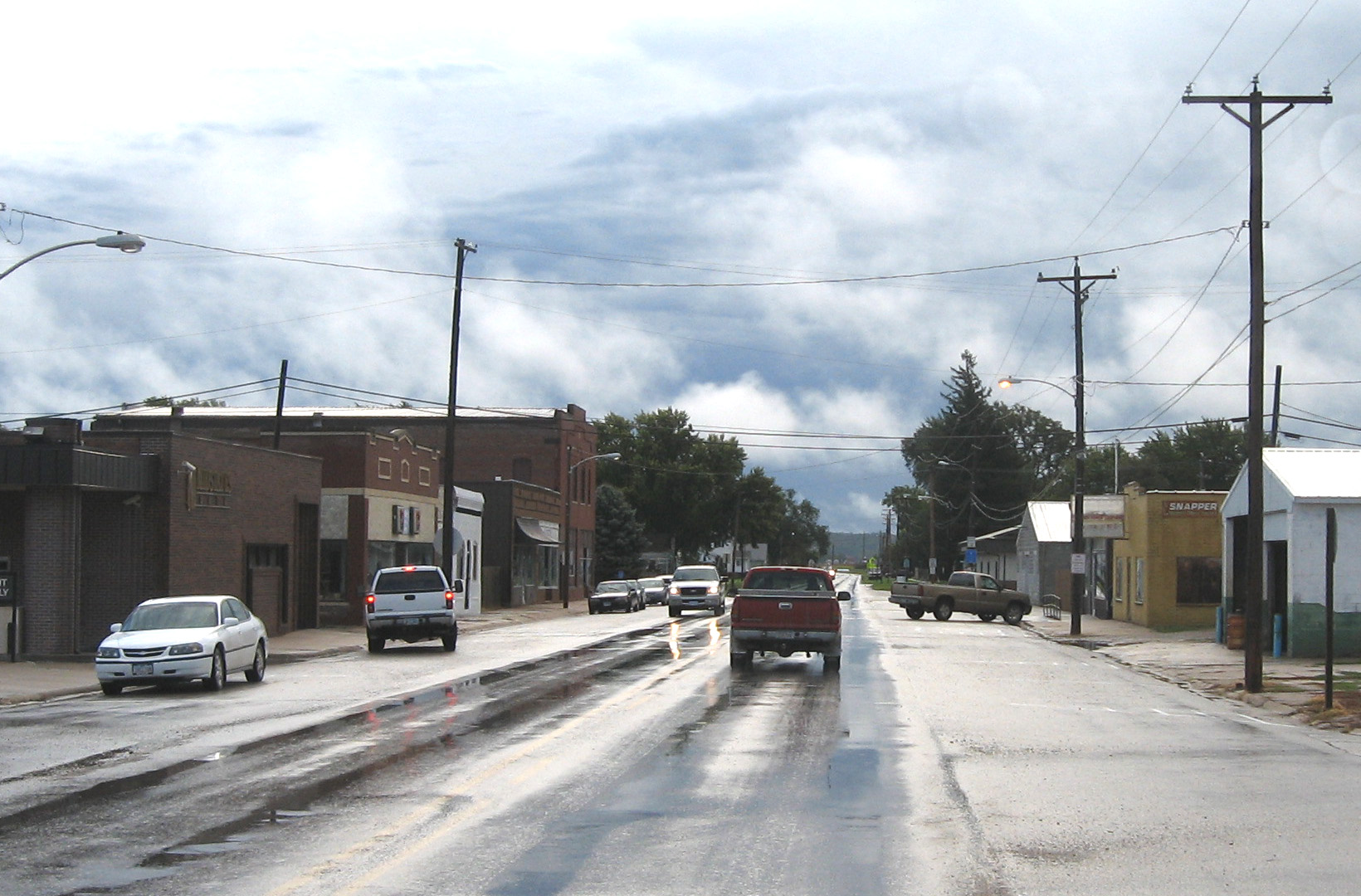
Iowa Highway 127 in Mondamin

Iowa Highway 127 begins at an interchange with Interstate 29 (I-29) west of Mondamin, traveling east along a two-lane highway. Just east of I-29, it meets Harrison County Road K45 (CR K45), which is a former alignment of US 75. Three miles (4.8 km) east of Mondamin, it meets the southern end of Iowa Highway 183, which is part of the Loess Hills Scenic Byway (LHSB). The LHSB follows Iowa 127 for 1 1/2 miles (2.4 km) before Iowa 127 turns to the east and the LHSB continues south along CR L20. The route travels east for 6 miles (9.7 km), passing through Magnolia, after which it turns to the south towards Logan. The designation ends at US 30 in downtown Logan.

== History ==
Iowa Highway 127 originally went traveled between US 75 west of Magnolia, where it now meets Harrison CR L20, and US 30 in Logan. This intersection is now where it meets CR L20. In 1968, upon completion of I-29 west of Mondamin, US 75 was relocated onto I-29 and Iowa 127 was extended west to the interstate.

== Major intersections ==
The entire route is in Harrison County.

Location	mi	km	Destinations	Notes
Mondamin	0.000	0.000	I-29 – Council Bluffs, Sioux City	
Mondamin	4.247	6.835	Iowa 183 north – Pisgah	
Magnolia	5.662	9.112	CR L20 (Loess Hills Scenic Byway) – Missouri Valley	Former Iowa 183
Logan	15.985	25.725	US 30 – Woodbine, Missouri Valley	
1.000 mi = 1.609 km; 1.000 km = 0.621 mi
