= Charter Oak–Ute Community School District =

Public school district in Iowa, United States

Coordinates: 42.065469°N 95.590859°W

Location
- Charter Oak, Iowa Crawford and Monona counties United States
- Coordinates: 42.065469, -95.590859

District information
- Type: Local school district
- Motto: Helping Students Reach Their Utmost Potential
- Grades: K-12
- Established: 1962
- Superintendent: Adam Eggeling
- Budget: $4,614,000 (2020-21)
- NCES District ID: 1907110

Students and staff
- Students: 185 (2022-23)
- Teachers: 19.40 FTE
- Staff: 27.51 FTE
- Student–teacher ratio: 9.54
- District mascot: Bobcats
- Colors: Royal blue and white

Other information
- Website: www.co-u.net

Charter Oak–Ute Community School District is a rural public school district headquartered in Charter Oak, Iowa. It serves grades K-8, while it sends high school students to the Maple Valley–Anthon–Oto Community School District as part of a grade-sharing arrangement.

The district, located in portions of Crawford and Monona counties, serves Charter Oak, Ute and Soldier.

== History ==
The district began operations in 1962 as a consolidation of the Charter Oak and Ute school districts. Beginning that year, Charter Oak–Ute had its own high school,

In 1979, the entire school district had 850 students. The high school division had 113 students in the 1991-1992 school year. On July 1, 2004, the East Monona Community School District was dissolved, with a portion going to Charter Oak–Ute. 28% of the former East Monona district, including the City of Soldier, was reassigned to Charter Oak–Ute.

The district, now including the portion of the East Monona territory, from 2005 to 2015, had an enrollment decline of 78 students. In 2006, the high school division had 102 students. In 2017, the district had a total of 264 students, with 78 students in the high school division, including 25 students in grade 12. Due to the decline in enrollments, in January 2017, the Charter Oak–Ute district and the MVAO district entered into a grade-sharing arrangement in which one district sends its students to another district for certain grade levels. As a result, the Charter Oak–Ute high school closed. MVAO High School was renamed MVAO-COU High School. Charter Oak–Ute will pay MVAO tuition costs.
