= West Harrison Community School District =

Public school district in Mondamin, Iowa, United States

Coordinates: 41.709025°N 96.017404°W

Location
- Mondamin, Iowa Harrison and Monona counties United States
- Coordinates: 41.709025, -96.017404

District information
- Type: Local school district
- Grades: K-12
- Superintendent: Marty Fonley
- Schools: 2
- Budget: $5,677,000 (2020-21)
- NCES District ID: 1930960

Students and staff
- Students: 309 (2022-23)
- Teachers: 23.18 FTE
- Staff: 37.12 FTE
- Student–teacher ratio: 13.33
- Athletic conference: Rolling Valley
- District mascot: Hawkeye
- Colors: Black and White

Other information
- Website: www.westharrison.school

West Harrison Community School District is a rural public school district headquartered in Mondamin, Iowa.

Located in sections of Harrison and Monona counties, the district serves the municipalities of Mondamin, Little Sioux, Modale, Moorhead, and Pisgah. It also serves River Sioux.

== History ==
In the early 1960s, the district was established.

The current school building opened in 1994.

On July 1, 2004, the East Monona Community School District was dissolved, with portions going to other school districts. 33% of the former district, including the City of Moorhead, was given to West Harrison.

== Schools ==
- West Harrison Elementary
- West Harrison Middle School / High School

== West Harrison High School ==
=== Athletics ===
The Hawkeyes compete in the Rolling Valley Conference in the following sports:

- Baseball
- Basketball (boys and girls)
- Cross Country (boys and girls)
- Football
- Softball
- Track and Field (boys and girls)
  - Boys' - 1970 Class B State Champions
- Volleyball
- Wrestling
- Cheerleading

=== Fight Song ===
We're lo- yal to you black and white, you're the col-ors for which we will fight! We will al-ways stand fast, We will fight to the last, keep-ing those col-ors float-ing free! Go crash-ing a-head, black and white, you're the col-ors for which we will fight! Our team is the stout protect-or, our team will be the vic-tor, Vic-t'ry to you black and white! GO YOU HAWK-EYES FIGHT, FIGHT, FIGHT! vic-t'ry to you black and white!

=== Extracurricular Activities ===
- FIRST LEGO League
- FCCLA
- Speech

=== Academics ===
In 2014, West Harrison Community School District received and honor of recognition from the U.S. News & World Report in May. Out of a total of 349 schools West Harrison was selected as one on the top 98 school districts in Iowa. West Harrison was awarded a bronze placing. West Harrison made the list for due to the student teacher ratio and test score proficiency in math (91%) and reading (88%).

== See also ==
- List of school districts in Iowa
- List of high schools in Iowa
