= Eden Township, Clinton County, Iowa =

Township in Iowa, US

Eden Township
- Township
- Location in Clinton County
- Coordinates: 41°47′27″N 090°24′12″W
- Country: United States
- State: Iowa
- County: Clinton

Area
  - Total: 35.63 sq mi (92.28 km^{2})
  - Land: 35.51 sq mi (91.98 km^{2})
  - Water: 0.12 sq mi (0.3 km^{2}) 0.33%
- Elevation: 620 ft (190 m)

Population (2000)
  - Total: 856
  - Density: 24/sq mi (9.3/km^{2})
- GNIS feature ID: 0467762

Eden Township is a township in Clinton County, Iowa, United States. As of the 2000 census, its population was 856.

== History ==
Eden Township was organized in 1856.

== Geography ==
Eden Township covers an area of 35.63 square miles (92.3 km^{2}) and contains one incorporated settlement, Low Moor. According to the USGS, it contains four cemeteries: Bowers-Dannatt-Hill, Cousin-Smith, Pehlam and Prairie Union.

The streams of Brophy Creek and Cherry Creek run through this township.
