= Iowa Highway 930 =

Unsigned state highway in Iowa, United States

Iowa Highway 930
- Iowa 930 highlighted in red, former routing in gray

Route information
- Auxiliary route of US 30
- Maintained by Iowa DOT
- Length: 1.738 mi (2.797 km)
- Existed: 1960s–present

Major junctions
- West end: US 30 near Ames
- East end: Story County line

Location
- Country: United States
- State: Iowa
- Counties: Boone

Highway system
- Iowa Primary Highway System; Interstate; US; State; Secondary; Scenic
| ← Iowa 926 | → Iowa 934 |

Iowa Highway 930 (Iowa 930) is a 1.7-mile-long (2.7 km) unsigned highway in Boone County, Iowa. During the 1960s, U.S. Highway 30 (US 30) in central Iowa was reconstructed to the south of where it ran, bypassing the cities of Marshalltown, Ames, and Boone. Upon completion, the entire old route of US 30 became Iowa 930. Gradually, most of Iowa 930 was turned back to the respective counties and cities except for the portion in Boone County.

== Route description ==
Iowa 930 begins at two half interchanges with US 30 in eastern Boone County. The two directions meet at the corner of 230th Street and X Avenue in the Boone County road grid. The highway heads east on 230th Street for one mile (1.6 km) where it ends at the county line with Story County. Coming from the north along the county line is County Road R38 (CR R38). The Iowa 930 roadway continues in Story County as CR R38 and is known as Lincoln Way.

== Major intersections ==
The entire route is in Colfax Township, Boone County.

| mi | km | Destinations | Notes |
|---|---|---|---|
| 0.000 | 0.000 | US 30 west – Boone | Westbound exit and eastbound entrance only |
| 0.000 | 0.000 | US 30 east – Ames, Napier | Eastbound exit and westbound entrance only |
| 1.738 | 2.797 | CR R38 north (Y Avenue / 500th Avenue) Lincoln Highway Heritage Byway / CR R38 south (Lincoln Way) – Ames | Route ends at the Boone–Story county line |
1.000 mi = 1.609 km; 1.000 km = 0.621 mi: Incomplete access
