= Soldier River =

River in Iowa, U.S.

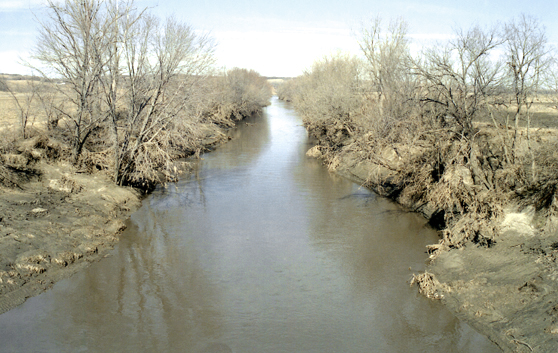
- A channelized section of the Soldier River near Moorhead

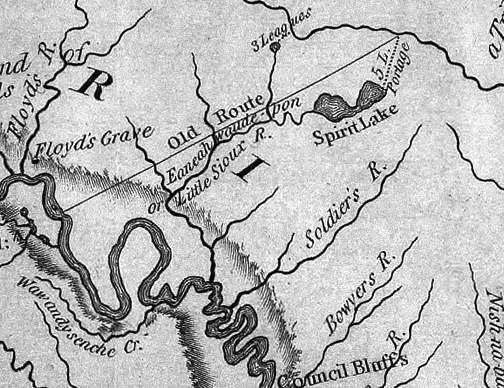
- This excerpt from the Lewis and Clark map of 1814 shows the rivers of western Iowa. The "Soldier's River" is seen at the center of the map.

Location
- Country: United States
- State: Iowa

Physical characteristics
- Source
  - coordinates: 42°16′11″N 95°19′47″W
- Mouth: Missouri River
  - coordinates: 41°44′18″N 96°05′51″W
  - elevation: 1,010 ft (310 m)
- Discharge
  - location: Pisgah, Iowa
  - average: 174 cu/ft. per sec.

The Soldier River is a tributary of the Missouri River, about 67 miles (108 km) long, in western Iowa in the United States. Several portions of the river's course have been straightened and channelized.

The Soldier River rises in southeastern Ida County and flows generally southwestwardly through northwestern Crawford, southeastern Monona and northwestern Harrison Counties, past the towns of Ute, Soldier, Moorhead and Pisgah. It flows into the Missouri River via a diversion channel about 5 mi (8 km) west-northwest of Mondamin.

At Ute, the river collects the East Soldier River, which rises near Schleswig and flows past Charter Oak. The East Soldier River collects the Middle Soldier River, which flows past Ricketts.

== See also ==
- List of Iowa rivers
- Tributaries of the Missouri River
