= East Monona Community School District =

Former school district in Iowa

East Monona Community School District was a school district with a single school in Moorhead, Iowa. It previously served the cities of Moorhead and Soldier.

== History ==
Circa 1997 the East Monona district and the Boyer Valley Community School District began a grade-sharing program. On September 9, 2003, the residents of the East Monona and Boyer Valley districts voted on a plan to consolidate the districts. The East Monona residents voted it down on a 313 to 178 basis, even though Boyer Valley residents voted in favor on a 385 to 30 basis. On Tuesday, September 23, 2003, the East Monona residents voted to dissolve the district, with 303–241 vote count.

On July 1, 2004, the district was dissolved, with portions going to the Boyer Valley, Charter Oak–Ute, West Harrison, and West Monona school districts. Moorhead was reassigned to West Harrison and Soldier was reassigned to Charter Oak–Ute. The percentages of the former East Monona district going to Boyer Valley, Charter Oak–Ute, West Harrison and West Monona were 10, 28, 33 and 28.
