= Ute, Iowa =

- City
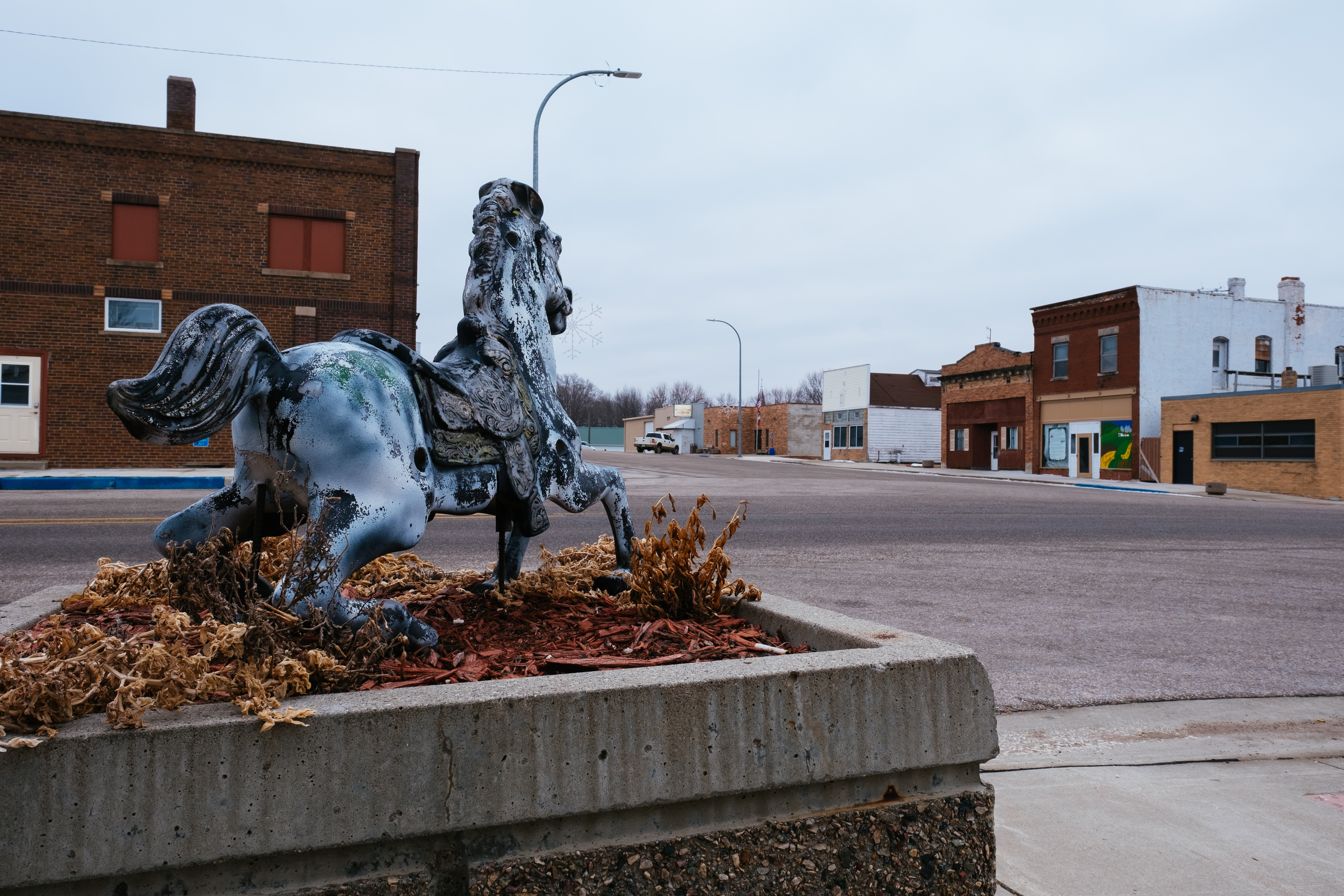
- Main Street in Ute

- Location of Ute, Iowa
- Coordinates: 42°03′01″N 95°42′21″W
- Country: United States
- State: Iowa
- County: Monona

Area
  - Total: 0.37 sq mi (0.96 km^{2})
  - Land: 0.37 sq mi (0.96 km^{2})
  - Water: 0 sq mi (0.00 km^{2})
- Elevation: 1,253 ft (382 m)

Population (2020)
  - Total: 338
  - Density: 908.5/sq mi (350.76/km^{2})
- Time zone: UTC-6 (Central (CST))
  - Summer (DST): UTC-5 (CDT)
- ZIP code: 51060
- Area code: 712
- FIPS code: 19-79995
- GNIS feature ID: 2397103
- Website: cityofute.com

Ute is a city in Monona County, Iowa, United States, along the Soldier River. The population was 338 at the time of the 2020 census.

== History ==
A post office called Ute has been in operation since 1876. The city was named after the Ute people.

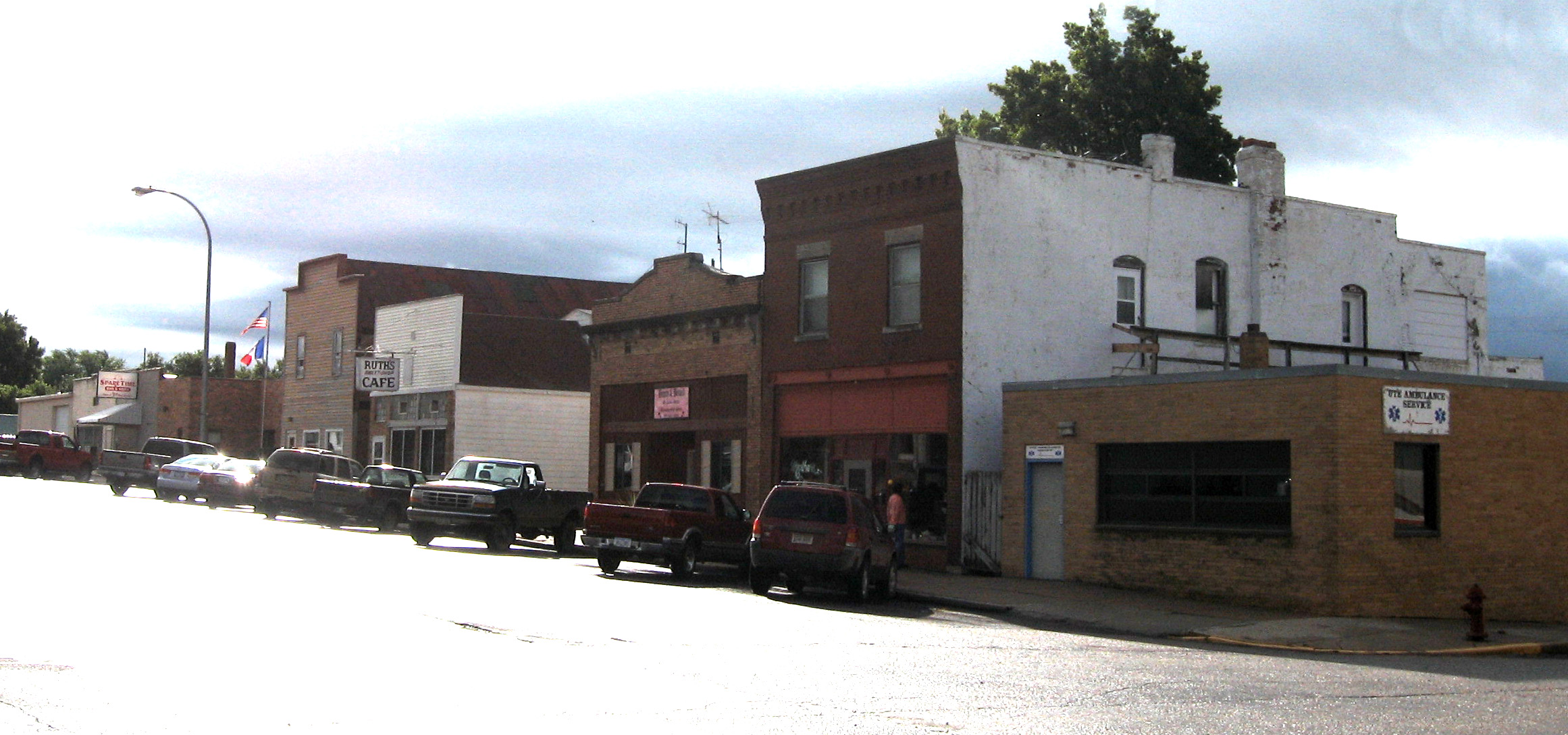
Downtown Ute

== Geography ==
According to the United States Census Bureau, the city has a total area of 0.39 square miles (1.01 km^{2}), all land. . According to the United States Census Bureau, the city has a total area of 0.39 square miles (1.01 km^{2}), all land.

== Demographics ==
Historical populations
Year	Pop.	±%
1900	407	—
1910	490	+20.4%
1920	580	+18.4%
1930	616	+6.2%
1940	581	−5.7%
1950	563	−3.1%
1960	511	−9.2%
1970	512	+0.2%
1980	479	−6.4%
1990	395	−17.5%
2000	378	−4.3%
2010	374	−1.1%
2020	338	−9.6%
Source:"U.S. Census website". United States Census Bureau. and Iowa Data Center; Source: U.S. Decennial Census

=== 2020 census ===
As of the census of 2020, there were 338 people, 168 households, and 85 families residing in the city. The population density was 908.5 inhabitants per square mile (350.8/km^{2}). There were 188 housing units at an average density of 505.3 per square mile (195.1/km^{2}). The racial makeup of the city was 97.3% White, 0.0% Black or African American, 0.0% Native American, 0.6% Asian, 0.0% Pacific Islander, 0.0% from other races and 2.1% from two or more races. Hispanic or Latino persons of any race comprised 0.9% of the population.

Of the 168 households, 14.9% of which had children under the age of 18 living with them, 34.5% were married couples living together, 9.5% were cohabitating couples, 35.1% had a female householder with no spouse or partner present and 20.8% had a male householder with no spouse or partner present. 49.4% of all households were non-families. 41.7% of all households were made up of individuals, 19.0% had someone living alone who was 65 years old or older.

The median age in the city was 48.8 years. 18.0% of the residents were under the age of 20; 5.6% were between the ages of 20 and 24; 23.1% were from 25 and 44; 26.6% were from 45 and 64; and 26.6% were 65 years of age or older. The gender makeup of the city was 46.4% male and 53.6% female.

=== 2010 census ===
As of the census of 2010, there were 374 people, 179 households, and 102 families living in the city. The population density was 959.0 inhabitants per square mile (370.3/km^{2}). There were 209 housing units at an average density of 535.9 per square mile (206.9/km^{2}). The racial makeup of the city was 98.7% White, 0.3% African American, 0.5% Native American, and 0.5% from two or more races. Hispanic or Latino of any race were 0.8% of the population.

There were 179 households, of which 21.8% had children under the age of 18 living with them, 44.1% were married couples living together, 9.5% had a female householder with no husband present, 3.4% had a male householder with no wife present, and 43.0% were non-families. 36.3% of all households were made up of individuals, and 18.5% had someone living alone who was 65 years of age or older. The average household size was 2.09 and the average family size was 2.70.

The median age in the city was 49.8 years. 19.5% of residents were under the age of 18; 7% were between the ages of 18 and 24; 16% were from 25 to 44; 31.5% were from 45 to 64; and 25.9% were 65 years of age or older. The gender makeup of the city was 48.4% male and 51.6% female.

=== 2000 census ===
As of the census of 2000, there were 378 people, 183 households, and 112 families living in the city. The population density was 956.7 inhabitants per square mile (369.4/km^{2}). There were 201 housing units at an average density of 508.7 per square mile (196.4/km^{2}). The racial makeup of the city was 99.74% White and 0.26% African American.

There were 183 households, out of which 19.1% had children under the age of 18 living with them, 54.1% were married couples living together, 6.0% had a female householder with no husband present, and 38.3% were non-families. 34.4% of all households were made up of individuals, and 20.8% had someone living alone who was 65 years of age or older. The average household size was 2.07 and the average family size was 2.61.

In the city, the population was spread out, with 17.7% under the age of 18, 4.8% from 18 to 24, 19.6% from 25 to 44, 24.3% from 45 to 64, and 33.6% who were 65 years of age or older. The median age was 53 years. For every 100 females, there were 86.2 males. For every 100 females age 18 and over, there were 84.0 males.

The median income for a household in the city was $30,875, and the median income for a family was $36,250. Males had a median income of $31,000 versus $21,250 for females. The per capita income for the city was $16,650. About 7.5% of families and 9.9% of the population were below the poverty line, including 16.0% of those under age 18 and 8.3% of those age 65 or over.

== Education ==
Charter Oak–Ute Community School District operates public schools.
