= Pisgah, Iowa =

- City
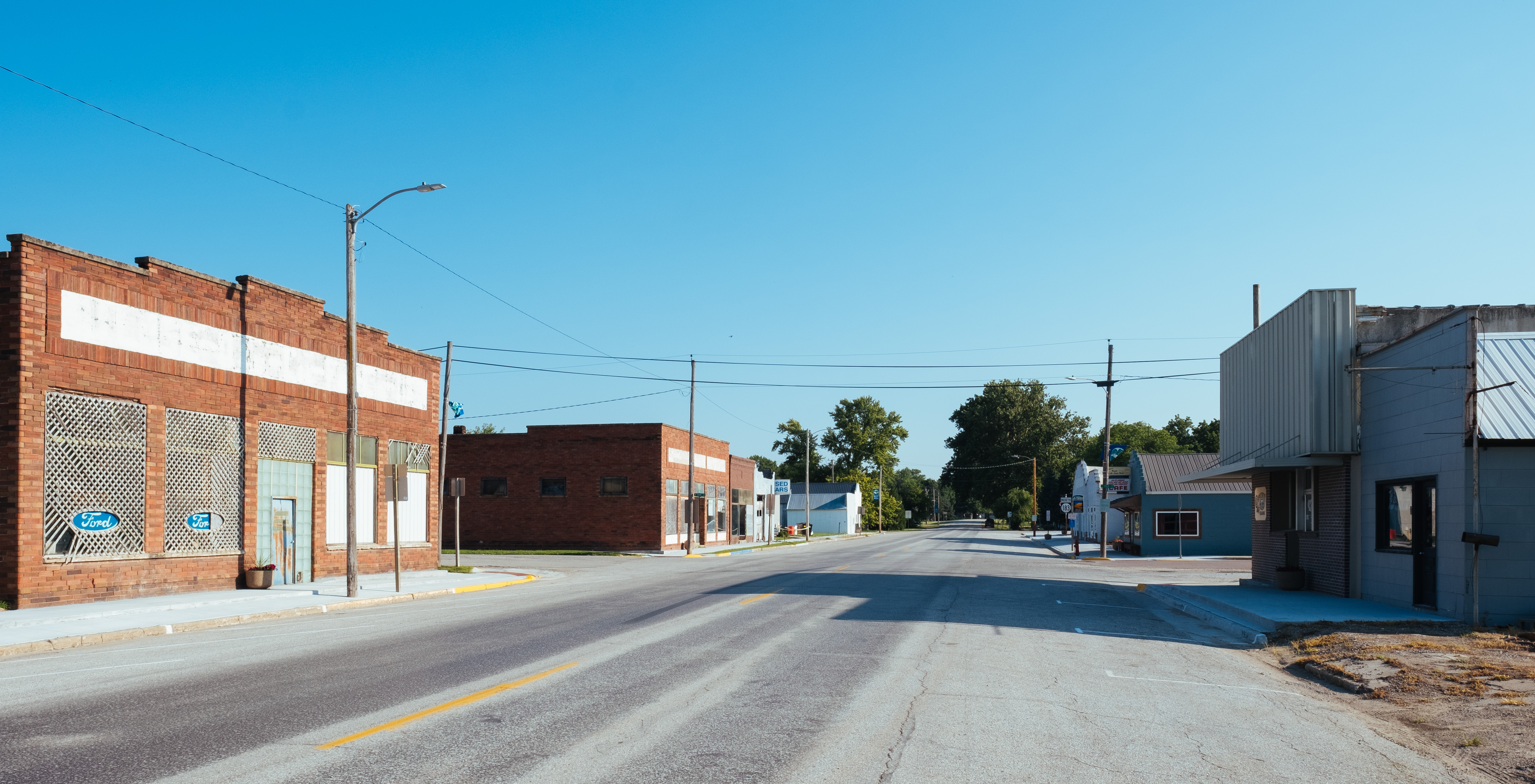
- 1st and Main Street in Pisgah

- Location within Iowa Location within the United States
- Coordinates: 41°49′47″N 95°55′34″W
- Country: United States
- State: Iowa
- County: Harrison
- Township: Jackson

Area
  - Total: 0.99 sq mi (2.56 km^{2})
  - Land: 0.99 sq mi (2.56 km^{2})
  - Water: 0 sq mi (0.00 km^{2})
- Elevation: 1,063 ft (324 m)

Population (2020)
  - Total: 249
  - Density: 252.2/sq mi (97.36/km^{2})
- Time zone: UTC-6 (Central (CST))
  - Summer (DST): UTC-5 (CDT)
- ZIP code: 51564
- Area code: 712
- FIPS code: 19-63075
- GNIS feature ID: 2396216

Pisgah is a city in Harrison County, Iowa, United States, along the Soldier River. The community is located in the midst of the Loess Hills. The population was 249 at the time of the 2020 census.

== History ==
Pisgah was laid out in 1899. The town's name is a biblical one chosen by members of the Church of Jesus Christ of Latter-day Saints (Mormons), who established a temporary settlement in central Iowa near a hill they christened Mount Pisgah. A post office called Pisgah has been in operation since 1902.

== Geography ==
According to the United States Census Bureau, the city has a total area of 1.01 square miles (2.62 km^{2}), all of it land.

== Demographics ==
Historical populations
Year	Pop.	±%
1910	212	—
1920	421	+98.6%
1930	400	−5.0%
1940	397	−0.7%
1950	327	−17.6%
1960	343	+4.9%
1970	286	−16.6%
1980	307	+7.3%
1990	268	−12.7%
2000	316	+17.9%
2010	251	−20.6%
2020	249	−0.8%
Source:"U.S. Census website". United States Census Bureau. and Iowa Data Center; Source: U.S. Decennial Census

=== 2020 census ===
As of the census of 2020, there were 249 people, 117 households, and 61 families residing in the city. The population density was 252.2 inhabitants per square mile (97.4/km^{2}). There were 136 housing units at an average density of 137.7 per square mile (53.2/km^{2}). The racial makeup of the city was 96.0% White, 0.0% Black or African American, 0.0% Native American, 0.4% Asian, 0.0% Pacific Islander, 0.4% from other races and 3.2% from two or more races. Hispanic or Latino persons of any race comprised 0.0% of the population.

Of the 117 households, 18.8% of which had children under the age of 18 living with them, 40.2% were married couples living together, 5.1% were cohabitating couples, 24.8% had a female householder with no spouse or partner present and 29.9% had a male householder with no spouse or partner present. 47.9% of all households were non-families. 41.0% of all households were made up of individuals, 16.2% had someone living alone who was 65 years old or older.

The median age in the city was 46.9 years. 20.5% of the residents were under the age of 20; 6.8% were between the ages of 20 and 24; 18.9% were from 25 and 44; 32.1% were from 45 and 64; and 21.7% were 65 years of age or older. The gender makeup of the city was 52.2% male and 47.8% female.

=== 2010 census ===
At the 2010 census there were 251 people, 121 households, and 66 families living in the city. The population density was 248.5 inhabitants per square mile (95.9/km^{2}). There were 143 housing units at an average density of 141.6 per square mile (54.7/km^{2}). The racial makeup of the city was 97.6% White, 0.8% Native American, and 1.6% from two or more races. Hispanic or Latino people of any race were 3.2%.

Of the 121 households 21.5% had children under the age of 18 living with them, 37.2% were married couples living together, 14.0% had a female householder with no husband present, 3.3% had a male householder with no wife present, and 45.5% were non-families. 43.8% of households were one person and 24% were one person aged 65 or older. The average household size was 2.07 and the average family size was 2.83.

The median age was 48.2 years. 23.1% of residents were under the age of 18; 5.3% were between the ages of 18 and 24; 16.8% were from 25 to 44; 30% were from 45 to 64; and 25.1% were 65 or older. The gender makeup of the city was 46.2% male and 53.8% female.

=== 2000 census ===
At the 2000 census there were 316 people, 143 households, and 84 families living in the city. The population density was 314.4 inhabitants per square mile (121.4/km^{2}). There were 147 housing units at an average density of 146.2 per square mile (56.4/km^{2}). The racial makeup of the city was 99.05% White, 0.32% Native American, 0.32% Asian, and 0.32% from two or more races. Hispanic or Latino people of any race were 0.63%.

Of the 143 households 24.5% had children under the age of 18 living with them, 51.0% were married couples living together, 7.0% had a female householder with no husband present, and 40.6% were non-families. 36.4% of households were one person and 25.2% were one person aged 65 or older. The average household size was 2.21 and the average family size was 2.89.

26.6% of the people are under the age of 18, 1.9% from 18 to 24, 21.2% from 25 to 44, 21.2% from 45 to 64, and 29.1% 65 or older. The median age was 45 years. For every 100 females, there were 83.7 males. For every 100 females age 18 and over, there were 88.6 males.

The median household income was $26,125 and the median family income was $37,292. Males had a median income of $27,250 versus $17,500 for females. The per capita income for the city was $13,837. About 10.8% of families and 15.5% of the population were below the poverty line, including 16.4% of those under age 18 and 18.0% of those age 65 or over.

== Education ==
It is within the West Harrison Community School District.

== Notable people ==
- James Allen, Mormon Battalion organizer
- Loren Babe, Major League Baseball third baseman
