= Moorhead, Iowa =

- City
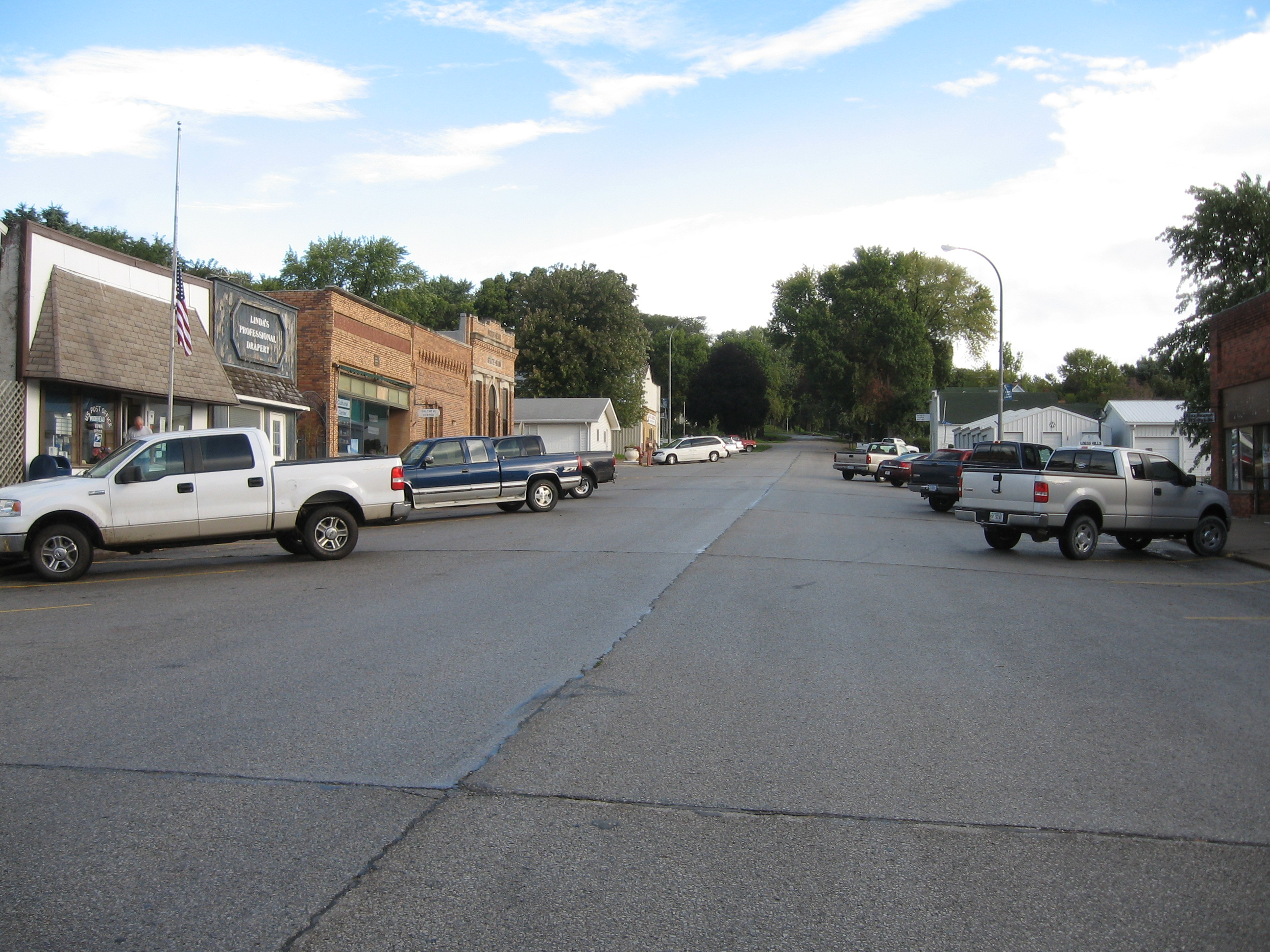
- Downtown Moorhead, Iowa

- Location of Moorhead, Iowa
- Coordinates: 41°55′24″N 95°51′05″W
- Country: USA
- State: Iowa
- County: Monona

Area
  - Total: 0.24 sq mi (0.61 km^{2})
  - Land: 0.24 sq mi (0.61 km^{2})
  - Water: 0 sq mi (0.00 km^{2})
- Elevation: 1,135 ft (346 m)

Population (2020)
  - Total: 199
  - Density: 845.9/sq mi (326.62/km^{2})
- Time zone: UTC-6 (Central (CST))
  - Summer (DST): UTC-5 (CDT)
- ZIP code: 51558
- Area code: 712
- FIPS code: 19-53850
- GNIS feature ID: 2395393

Moorhead is a city in Monona County, Iowa, United States. Moorhead stands along the Soldier River. The population was 199 at the time of the 2020 census.

== History ==
A post office was established at Moorhead in 1872. Moorhead was platted in 1899. The city was named for John Bennett Moorhead (1830-1921), a first settler who is listed as its founder on the Find A Grave website.

== Geography ==
According to the United States Census Bureau, the city has a total area of 0.32 square miles (0.83 km^{2}), all land. Moorhead's mayor until 2000 was Ivan Nielsen.

== Demographics ==
Historical populations
Year	Pop.	±%
1900	200	—
1910	366	+83.0%
1920	381	+4.1%
1930	372	−2.4%
1940	421	+13.2%
1950	392	−6.9%
1960	313	−20.2%
1970	271	−13.4%
1980	264	−2.6%
1990	259	−1.9%
2000	232	−10.4%
2010	226	−2.6%
2020	199	−11.9%
Source:"U.S. Census website". United States Census Bureau. and Iowa Data Center; Source: U.S. Decennial Census

=== 2020 census ===
As of the census of 2020, there were 199 people, 94 households, and 55 families residing in the city. The population density was 845.9 inhabitants per square mile (326.6/km^{2}). There were 115 housing units at an average density of 488.9 per square mile (188.8/km^{2}). The racial makeup of the city was 97.0% White, 0.5% Black or African American, 0.0% Native American, 0.0% Asian, 0.0% Pacific Islander, 1.0% from other races and 1.5% from two or more races. Hispanic or Latino persons of any race comprised 0.5% of the population.

Of the 94 households, 22.3% of which had children under the age of 18 living with them, 42.6% were married couples living together, 5.3% were cohabitating couples, 29.8% had a female householder with no spouse or partner present and 22.3% had a male householder with no spouse or partner present. 41.5% of all households were non-families. 36.2% of all households were made up of individuals, 24.5% had someone living alone who was 65 years old or older.

The median age in the city was 48.8 years. 21.1% of the residents were under the age of 20; 5.5% were between the ages of 20 and 24; 20.1% were from 25 and 44; 27.1% were from 45 and 64; and 26.1% were 65 years of age or older. The gender makeup of the city was 47.7% male and 52.3% female.

=== 2010 census ===
As of the census of 2010, there were 226 people, 105 households, and 63 families living in the city. The population density was 706.3 inhabitants per square mile (272.7/km^{2}). There were 117 housing units at an average density of 365.6 per square mile (141.2/km^{2}). The racial makeup of the city was 98.2% White, 0.4% African American, 0.9% Asian, and 0.4% from two or more races. Hispanic or Latino of any race were 0.9% of the population.

There were 105 households, of which 18.1% had children under the age of 18 living with them, 49.5% were married couples living together, 8.6% had a female householder with no husband present, 1.9% had a male householder with no wife present, and 40.0% were non-families. 30.5% of all households were made up of individuals, and 14.3% had someone living alone who was 65 years of age or older. The average household size was 2.15 and the average family size was 2.68.

The median age in the city was 51.4 years. 16.4% of residents were under the age of 18; 4.9% were between the ages of 18 and 24; 19.9% were from 25 to 44; 31.4% were from 45 to 64; and 27.4% were 65 years of age or older. The gender makeup of the city was 50.0% male and 50.0% female.

=== 2000 census ===
As of the census of 2000, there were 232 people, 111 households, and 72 families living in the city. The population density was 742.9 inhabitants per square mile (286.8/km^{2}). There were 121 housing units at an average density of 387.5 per square mile (149.6/km^{2}). The racial makeup of the city was 99.14% White, 0.43% Asian, and 0.43% from two or more races.

There were 111 households, out of which 22.5% had children under the age of 18 living with them, 54.1% were married couples living together, 8.1% had a female householder with no husband present, and 35.1% were non-families. 34.2% of all households were made up of individuals, and 19.8% had someone living alone who was 65 years of age or older. The average household size was 2.09 and the average family size was 2.64.

In the city, the population was spread out, with 21.1% under the age of 18, 4.7% from 18 to 24, 20.7% from 25 to 44, 25.9% from 45 to 64, and 27.6% who were 65 years of age or older. The median age was 47 years. For every 100 females, there were 95.0 males. For every 100 females age 18 and over, there were 90.6 males.

The median income for a household in the city was $26,042, and the median income for a family was $38,750. Males had a median income of $31,875 versus $19,167 for females. The per capita income for the city was $16,644. About 6.2% of families and 9.1% of the population were below the poverty line, including 5.3% of those under the age of eighteen and 18.5% of those 65 or over.

== Schools ==
Moorhead is within the West Harrison Community School District.

It was previously served by the East Monona Community School District, which maintained its school in Moorhead. On July 1, 2004 the East Monona district was dissolved, with portions going to other school districts. The City of Moorhead was reassigned to West Harrison.
