= Low Moor, Iowa =

- City
- Location of Low Moor, Iowa
- Coordinates: 41°48′11″N 90°21′18″W
- Country: United States
- State: Iowa
- County: Clinton

Area
  - Total: 0.54 sq mi (1.41 km^{2})
  - Land: 0.54 sq mi (1.41 km^{2})
  - Water: 0 sq mi (0.00 km^{2})
- Elevation: 640 ft (200 m)

Population (2020)
  - Total: 250
  - Density: 459.1/sq mi (177.27/km^{2})
- Time zone: UTC-6 (Central (CST))
  - Summer (DST): UTC-5 (CDT)
- ZIP code: 52757
- Area code: 563
- FIPS code: 19-47010
- GNIS feature ID: 2395776
- Website: cityoflowmoor.com

Low Moor is a city in Clinton County, Iowa, United States. The population was 250 at the time of the 2020 census.

== History ==
Low Moor was platted in 1858, at the time the Chicago and North Western Railway was built. The name Low Moor was selected after someone noticed that Low Moor, England, was stamped on the iron rails.

== Geography ==
According to the United States Census Bureau, the city has a total area of 0.47 square miles (1.22 km^{2}), all land.

== Demographics ==
Historical populations
Year	Pop.	±%
1880	168	—
1900	318	+89.3%
1910	253	−20.4%
1920	277	+9.5%
1930	271	−2.2%
1940	252	−7.0%
1950	279	+10.7%
1960	343	+22.9%
1970	347	+1.2%
1980	346	−0.3%
1990	280	−19.1%
2000	240	−14.3%
2010	288	+20.0%
2020	250	−13.2%
Source:"U.S. Census website". United States Census Bureau. and Iowa Data Center; Source: U.S. Decennial Census

=== 2020 census ===
As of the census of 2020, there were 250 people, 106 households, and 66 families residing in the city. The population density was 459.1 inhabitants per square mile (177.3/km^{2}). There were 112 housing units at an average density of 205.7 per square mile (79.4/km^{2}). The racial makeup of the city was 96.4% White, 0.0% Black or African American, 0.0% Native American, 0.0% Asian, 0.0% Pacific Islander, 0.0% from other races and 3.6% from two or more races. Hispanic or Latino persons of any race comprised 2.0% of the population.

Of the 106 households, 31.1% of which had children under the age of 18 living with them, 38.7% were married couples living together, 16.0% were cohabitating couples, 17.0% had a female householder with no spouse or partner present and 28.3% had a male householder with no spouse or partner present. 37.7% of all households were non-families. 29.2% of all households were made up of individuals, 17.0% had someone living alone who was 65 years old or older.

The median age in the city was 39.0 years. 23.6% of the residents were under the age of 20; 5.6% were between the ages of 20 and 24; 27.2% were from 25 and 44; 26.4% were from 45 and 64; and 17.2% were 65 years of age or older. The gender makeup of the city was 52.8% male and 47.2% female.

=== 2010 census ===
As of the census of 2010, there were 288 people, 117 households, and 77 families living in the city. The population density was 612.8 inhabitants per square mile (236.6/km^{2}). There were 124 housing units at an average density of 263.8 per square mile (101.9/km^{2}). The racial makeup of the city was 97.6% White, 0.7% African American, and 1.7% from two or more races. Hispanic or Latino of any race were 0.3% of the population.

There were 117 households, of which 26.5% had children under the age of 18 living with them, 49.6% were married couples living together, 6.0% had a female householder with no husband present, 10.3% had a male householder with no wife present, and 34.2% were non-families. 23.1% of all households were made up of individuals, and 10.2% had someone living alone who was 65 years of age or older. The average household size was 2.46 and the average family size was 2.75.

The median age in the city was 39.6 years. 21.9% of residents were under the age of 18; 9.8% were between the ages of 18 and 24; 22.7% were from 25 to 44; 29.5% were from 45 to 64; and 16.3% were 65 years of age or older. The gender makeup of the city was 53.5% male and 46.5% female.

=== 2000 census ===
As of the census of 2000, there were 240 people, 94 households, and 68 families living in the city. The population density was 514.6 inhabitants per square mile (198.7/km^{2}). There were 100 housing units at an average density of 214.4 per square mile (82.8/km^{2}). The racial makeup of the city was 99.58% White and 0.42% Native American.

There were 94 households, out of which 30.9% had children under the age of 18 living with them, 61.7% were married couples living together, 5.3% had a female householder with no husband present, and 26.6% were non-families. 23.4% of all households were made up of individuals, and 6.4% had someone living alone who was 65 years of age or older. The average household size was 2.55 and the average family size was 3.00.

25.0% are under the age of 18, 8.3% from 18 to 24, 32.5% from 25 to 44, 20.8% from 45 to 64, and 13.3% who were 65 years of age or older. The median age was 38 years. For every 100 females, there were 105.1 males. For every 100 females age 18 and over, there were 106.9 males.

The median income for a household in the city was $40,417, and the median income for a family was $44,500. Males had a median income of $31,875 versus $17,188 for females. The per capita income for the city was $18,585. About 2.6% of families and 5.5% of the population were below the poverty line, including 8.5% of those under the age of eighteen and none of those 65 or over.

== Education ==
Low Moor is a part of the Central DeWitt Community School District, known as the Central Clinton Community School District until July 1, 2014.
