= Mondamin (deity) =

Anishinaabe/Miami maize deity

Mondamin (or Mandaamin) is an Anishinaabe or Miami maize deity.

In traditional Native American/First Nations' legend, he is believed to have given humans the maize by turning into a maize field after being defeated.

Some of his comparative fame was justified by Henry Wadsworth Longfellow's poem The Song of Hiawatha, where Mondamin appears as maize personified.

A crater on the dwarf planet Ceres is named for the deity.

== Trivia ==
In Germany, the name Mondamin almost exclusively denotes a (now Unilever-held) brand of cornstarch-based convenience products. In 1913, Mondamin GmbH had chosen its company name especially in order to hint at the Hiawatha lore, the brand itself dating back to 1896.

The name of Mondawmin Mall, a Baltimore, Maryland, shopping center that opened in 1956, is presumed to be a variation on the name of the god. The mall sits on part of the former Mondawmin Manor, a 19th-century estate whose owner is said to have been encouraged by the poet Henry Wadsworth Longfellow to name it after Mondamin, who is mentioned in his poem "The Song of Hiawatha."
