= Soldier, Iowa =

- City
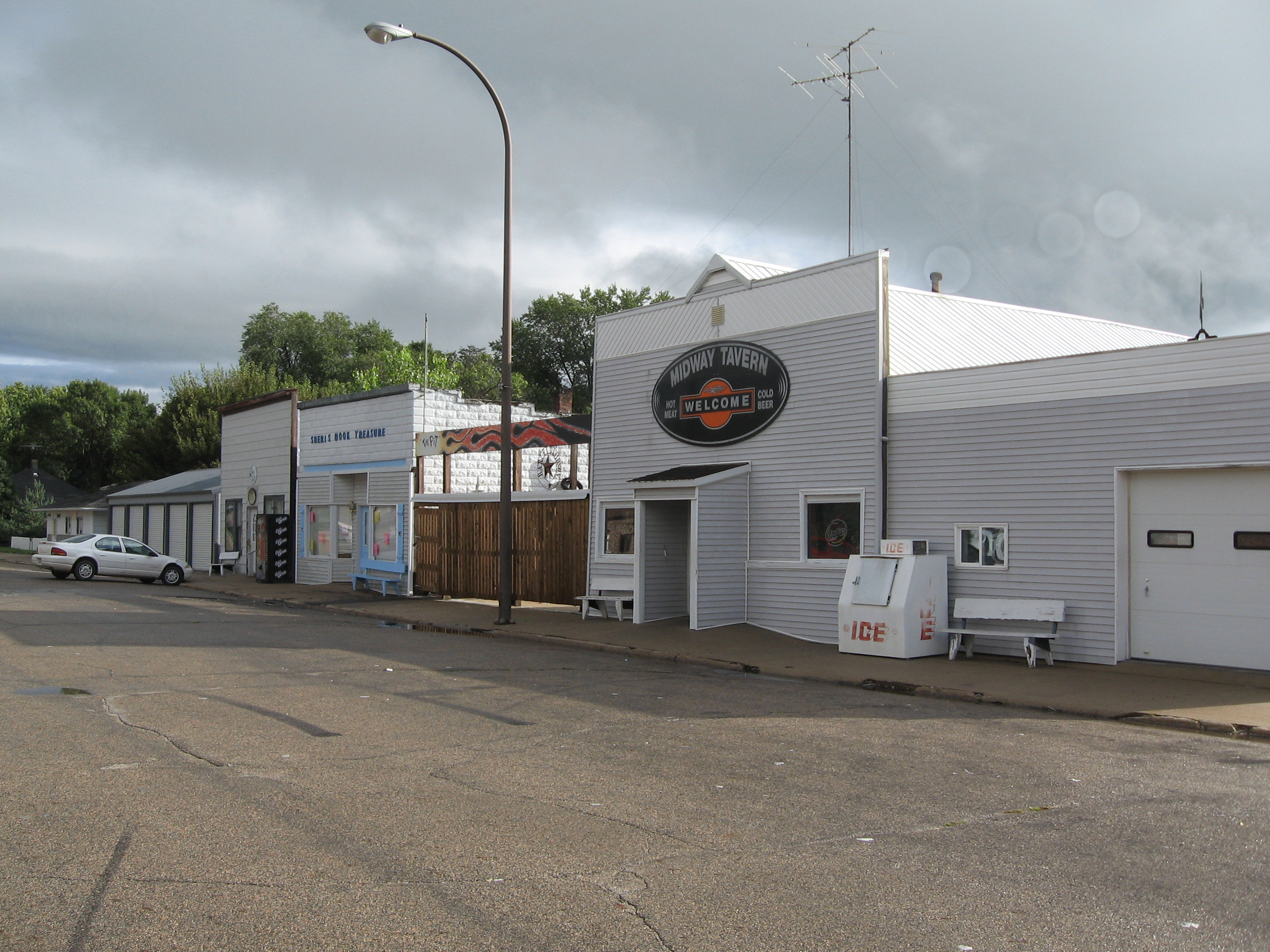
- Downtown Soldier, Iowa

- Location of Soldier, Iowa
- Coordinates: 41°59′04″N 95°46′50″W
- Country: USA
- State: Iowa
- County: Monona

Area
  - Total: 0.31 sq mi (0.80 km^{2})
  - Land: 0.31 sq mi (0.80 km^{2})
  - Water: 0 sq mi (0.00 km^{2})
- Elevation: 1,171 ft (357 m)

Population (2020)
  - Total: 184
  - Density: 593.5/sq mi (229.17/km^{2})
- Time zone: UTC-6 (Central (CST))
  - Summer (DST): UTC-5 (CDT)
- ZIP code: 51572
- Area code: 712
- FIPS code: 19-73785
- GNIS feature ID: 2395906
- Website: cityofsoldier.com

Soldier is a city in Monona County, Iowa, United States, along the Soldier River. The population was 184 at the time of the 2020 census.

Soldier was so named from a nearby unmarked grave of a soldier.

== Geography ==
According to the United States Census Bureau, the city has a total area of 0.29 square miles (0.75 km^{2}), all land.

== Demographics ==
Historical populations
| Year | Pop. | ±% |
|---|---|---|
| 1910 | 167 | — |
| 1920 | 281 | +68.3% |
| 1930 | 302 | +7.5% |
| 1940 | 208 | −31.1% |
| 1950 | 323 | +55.3% |
| 1960 | 284 | −12.1% |
| 1970 | 242 | −14.8% |
| 1980 | 257 | +6.2% |
| 1990 | 205 | −20.2% |
| 2000 | 207 | +1.0% |
| 2010 | 174 | −15.9% |
| 2020 | 184 | +5.7% |
Source:"U.S. Census website". United States Census Bureau. and Iowa Data Center; Source: U.S. Decennial Census

=== 2020 census ===
As of the census of 2020, there were 184 people, 90 households, and 46 families residing in the city. The population density was 593.5 inhabitants per square mile (229.2/km^{2}). There were 108 housing units at an average density of 348.4 per square mile (134.5/km^{2}). The racial makeup of the city was 98.9% White, 0.0% Black or African American, 0.0% Native American, 0.0% Asian, 0.0% Pacific Islander, 0.0% from other races and 1.1% from two or more races. Hispanic or Latino persons of any race comprised 0.0% of the population.

Of the 90 households, 21.1% of which had children under the age of 18 living with them, 37.8% were married couples living together, 13.3% were cohabitating couples, 27.8% had a female householder with no spouse or partner present and 21.1% had a male householder with no spouse or partner present. 48.9% of all households were non-families. 35.6% of all households were made up of individuals, 15.6% had someone living alone who was 65 years old or older.

The median age in the city was 48.5 years. 15.8% of the residents were under the age of 20; 7.6% were between the ages of 20 and 24; 24.5% were from 25 and 44; 25.0% were from 45 and 64; and 27.2% were 65 years of age or older. The gender makeup of the city was 48.9% male and 51.1% female.

=== 2010 census ===
As of the census of 2010, there were 174 people, 88 households, and 48 families living in the city. The population density was 600.0 inhabitants per square mile (231.7/km^{2}). There were 111 housing units at an average density of 382.8 per square mile (147.8/km^{2}). The racial makeup of the city was 94.8% White, 0.6% African American, 1.1% Native American, and 3.4% from two or more races. Hispanic or Latino of any race were 2.9% of the population.

There were 88 households, of which 17.0% had children under the age of 18 living with them, 50.0% were married couples living together, 3.4% had a female householder with no husband present, 1.1% had a male householder with no wife present, and 45.5% were non-families (a household of one person or only unrelated persons). 38.6% of all households were made up of individuals, and 15.9% had someone living alone who was 65 years of age or older. The average household size was 1.98 and the average family size was 2.58.

The median age in the city was 52.5 years. 16.1% of residents were under the age of 18; 7.4% were between the ages of 18 and 24; 16% were from 25 to 44; 36.8% were from 45 to 64; and 23.6% were 65 years of age or older. The gender makeup of the city was 49.4% male and 50.6% female.

=== 2000 census ===
As of the census of 2000, there were 207 people, 103 households, and 59 families living in the city. The population density was 696.6 inhabitants per square mile (269.0/km^{2}). There were 113 housing units at an average density of 380.3 per square mile (146.8/km^{2}). The racial makeup of the city was 98.55% White, 0.97% Native American, and 0.48% from two or more races.

There were 103 households, out of which 16.5% had children under the age of 18 living with them, 48.5% were married couples living together, 5.8% had a female householder with no husband present, and 42.7% were non-families. 37.9% of all households were made up of individuals, and 22.3% had someone living alone who was 65 years of age or older. The average household size was 2.01 and the average family size was 2.49.

In the city, the population was spread out, with 17.9% under the age of 18, 4.8% from 18 to 24, 20.8% from 25 to 44, 26.6% from 45 to 64, and 30.0% who were 65 years of age or older. The median age was 49 years. For every 100 females, there were 83.2 males. For every 100 females age 18 and over, there were 86.8 males.

The median income for a household in the city was $22,344, and the median income for a family was $37,841. Males had a median income of $24,479 versus $14,375 for females. The per capita income for the city was $14,877. About 7.0% of families and 16.8% of the population were below the poverty line, including none of those under the age of eighteen and 23.6% of those 65 or over.

== Education ==
Charter Oak–Ute Community School District operates public schools.

Soldier was previously in the East Monona Community School District. On July 1, 2004, the district was dissolved, with portions going to different districts; Soldier was reassigned to Charter Oak–Ute.
