= Mondamin, Iowa =

- City
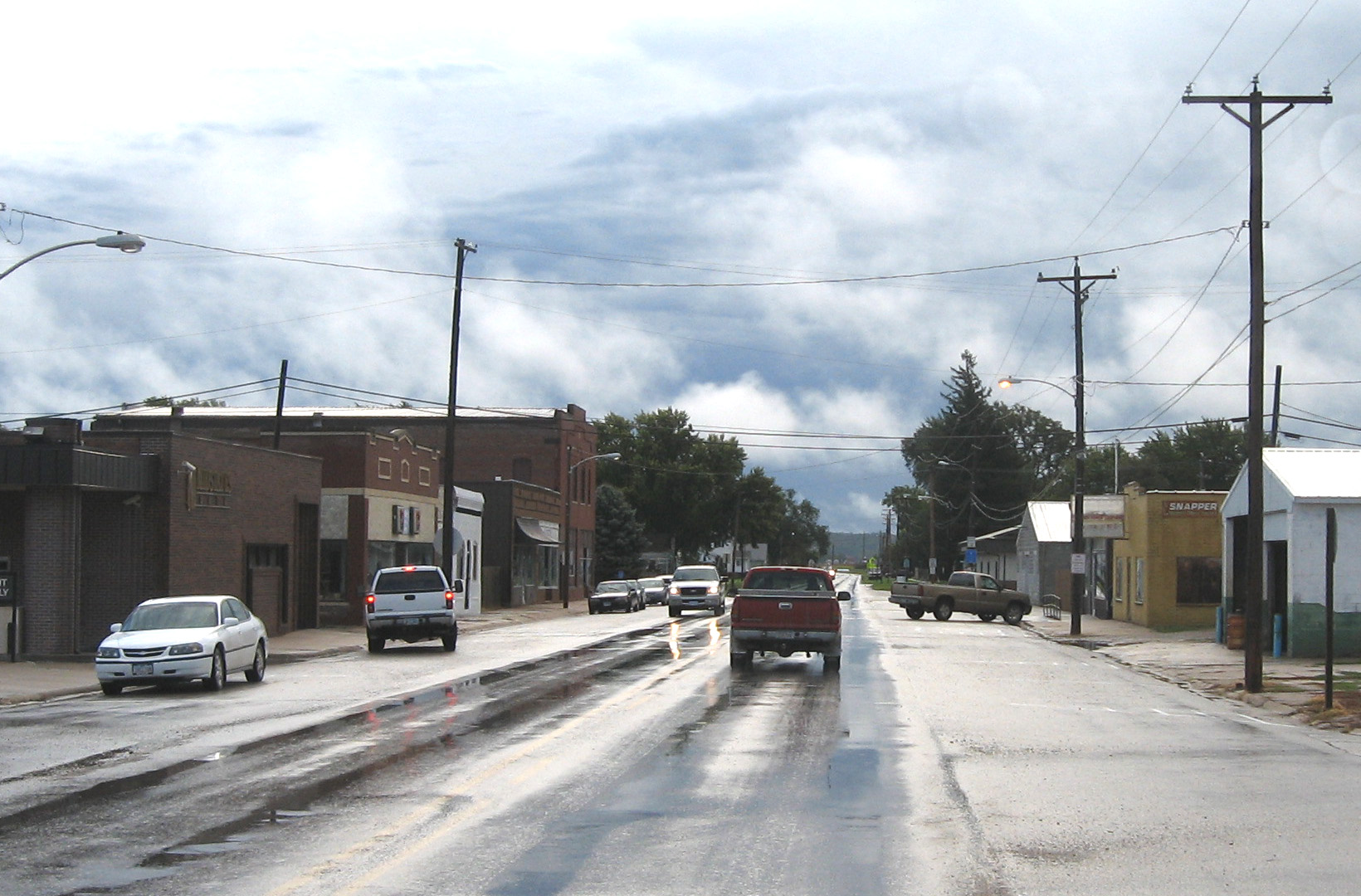
- Downtown Mondamin, Iowa

- Location of Mondamin, Iowa

- Location within Iowa Location within the United States
- Coordinates: 41°42′36″N 96°01′17″W
- Country: United States
- State: Iowa
- County: Harrison
- Township: Morgan

Area
  - Total: 0.45 sq mi (1.17 km^{2})
  - Land: 0.45 sq mi (1.17 km^{2})
  - Water: 0 sq mi (0.00 km^{2})
- Elevation: 1,024 ft (312 m)

Population (2020)
  - Total: 339
  - Density: 750/sq mi (289.4/km^{2})
- Time zone: UTC-6 (Central (CST))
  - Summer (DST): UTC-5 (CDT)
- ZIP code: 51557
- Area code: 712
- FIPS code: 19-53175
- GNIS feature ID: 2395369
- Website: mondaminiowa.com

Mondamin is a city in Harrison County, Iowa, United States. The population was 339 at the time of the 2020 census.

== History ==
Mondamin was platted in the winter of 1867–1868 when the railroad was extended to that point. It was named after Mondamin, a Native American corn deity.

== Geography ==
According to the United States Census Bureau, the city has a total area of 0.45 square miles (1.17 km^{2}), all of it land.

== Demographics ==
Historical populations
Year	Pop.	±%
1880	158	—
1890	257	+62.7%
1900	384	+49.4%
1910	420	+9.4%
1920	508	+21.0%
1930	534	+5.1%
1940	610	+14.2%
1950	489	−19.8%
1960	436	−10.8%
1970	420	−3.7%
1980	423	+0.7%
1990	403	−4.7%
2000	423	+5.0%
2010	402	−5.0%
2020	339	−15.7%
Source:"U.S. Census website". United States Census Bureau. and Iowa Data Center; Source: U.S. Decennial Census

=== 2020 census ===
As of the census of 2020, there were 339 people, 162 households, and 89 families residing in the city. The population density was 749.6 inhabitants per square mile (289.4/km^{2}). There were 192 housing units at an average density of 424.5 per square mile (163.9/km^{2}). The racial makeup of the city was 96.2% White, 0.0% Black or African American, 0.0% Native American, 0.0% Asian, 0.3% Pacific Islander, 1.2% from other races and 2.4% from two or more races. Hispanic or Latino persons of any race comprised 1.2% of the population.

Of the 162 households, 21.6% of which had children under the age of 18 living with them, 42.6% were married couples living together, 5.6% were cohabitating couples, 30.9% had a female householder with no spouse or partner present and 21.0% had a male householder with no spouse or partner present. 45.1% of all households were non-families. 38.9% of all households were made up of individuals, 15.4% had someone living alone who was 65 years old or older.

The median age in the city was 47.1 years. 21.5% of the residents were under the age of 20; 6.2% were between the ages of 20 and 24; 20.9% were from 25 and 44; 30.4% were from 45 and 64; and 20.9% were 65 years of age or older. The gender makeup of the city was 53.1% male and 46.9% female.

=== 2010 census ===
As of the census of 2010, there were 402 people, 175 households, and 122 families living in the city. The population density was 893.3 inhabitants per square mile (344.9/km^{2}). There were 194 housing units at an average density of 431.1 per square mile (166.4/km^{2}). The racial makeup of the city was 97.8% White, 0.2% African American, 0.5% Asian, 0.5% from other races, and 1.0% from two or more races. Hispanic or Latino of any race were 1.0% of the population.

There were 175 households, of which 29.1% had children under the age of 18 living with them, 50.9% were married couples living together, 10.3% had a female householder with no husband present, 8.6% had a male householder with no wife present, and 30.3% were non-families. 26.3% of all households were made up of individuals, and 15.5% had someone living alone who was 65 years of age or older. The average household size was 2.30 and the average family size was 2.70.

The median age in the city was 44.8 years. 22.6% of residents were under the age of 18; 7.3% were between the ages of 18 and 24; 20.4% were from 25 to 44; 28.2% were from 45 to 64; and 21.6% were 65 years of age or older. The gender makeup of the city was 50.0% male and 50.0% female.

=== 2000 census ===
As of the census of 2000, there were 423 people, 175 households, and 120 families living in the city. The population density was 915.0 inhabitants per square mile (353.3/km^{2}). There were 191 housing units at an average density of 413.1 per square mile (159.5/km^{2}). The racial makeup of the city was 98.35% White, 0.24% Native American, and 1.42% from two or more races. Hispanic or Latino of any race were 0.24% of the population.

There were 175 households, out of which 32.6% had children under the age of 18 living with them, 56.0% were married couples living together, 6.9% had a female householder with no husband present, and 30.9% were non-families. 26.3% of all households were made up of individuals, and 12.6% had someone living alone who was 65 years of age or older. The average household size was 2.42 and the average family size was 2.92.

In the city, the population was spread out, with 26.2% under the age of 18, 6.1% from 18 to 24, 29.1% from 25 to 44, 22.0% from 45 to 64, and 16.5% who were 65 years of age or older. The median age was 37 years. For every 100 females, there were 93.2 males. For every 100 females age 18 and over, there were 90.2 males.

The median income for a household in the city was $40,278, and the median income for a family was $41,406. Males had a median income of $31,667 versus $21,146 for females. The per capita income for the city was $18,123. About 4.9% of families and 3.1% of the population were below the poverty line, including 1.6% of those under age 18 and 3.0% of those age 65 or over.

== Education ==
It is within the West Harrison Community School District.
