= California Junction, Iowa =

- Census-designated place
- Location of Iowa in the United States

- Location within Iowa Location within the United States
- Coordinates: 41°33′37″N 95°59′41″W
- Country: USA
- State: Iowa
- County: Harrison
- Township: Cincinnati
- Founded: September 9, 1880
- Founded by: Missouri Valley Land Company

Area
  - Total: 0.46 sq mi (1.19 km^{2})
  - Land: 0.46 sq mi (1.19 km^{2})
  - Water: 0 sq mi (0.00 km^{2})
- Elevation: 1,007 ft (307 m)

Population (2020)
  - Total: 74
  - Density: 160.7/sq mi (62.04/km^{2})
- Time zone: UTC-6 (Central (CST))
  - Summer (DST): UTC-5 (CDT)
- ZIP code: 51555
- Area code: 712
- FIPS code: 19-09910
- GNIS feature ID: 2583481

California Junction is an unincorporated community and census-designated place (CDP) in Harrison County, Iowa, United States. It lies just east of the junction between the east–west and north–south lines of the former Sioux City and Pacific Railroad. In the 2020 census it had a population of 74.

== Geography ==
California Junction is located near the southwest corner of Harrison County. The community is 1 mile (1.6 km) northeast of the Iowa–Nebraska border, which in this area follows the center of De Soto Lake, an abandoned channel of the Missouri River. U.S. Route 30 passes just south of California Junction, leading east 4 miles (6 km) to Interstate 29 on the outskirts of Missouri Valley and west 7 miles (11 km) to Blair, Nebraska.

According to the United States Census Bureau, California Junction has a total area of 0.461 square miles (1.19 km^{2}), all of it land.

== Demographics ==
Historical population
Census	Pop.	Note	%±
2010	85		—
2020	74		−12.9%
U.S. Decennial Census

=== 2020 census ===
As of the census of 2020, there were 74 people, 30 households, and 19 families residing in the community. The population density was 160.7 inhabitants per square mile (62.0/km^{2}). There were 30 housing units at an average density of 65.1 per square mile (25.2/km^{2}). The racial makeup of the community was 100.0% White, 0.0% Black or African American, 0.0% Native American, 0.0% Asian, 0.0% Pacific Islander, 0.0% from other races and 0.0% from two or more races. Hispanic or Latino persons of any race comprised 0.0% of the population.

Of the 30 households, 10.0% of which had children under the age of 18 living with them, 63.3% were married couples living together, 0.0% were cohabitating couples, 16.7% had a female householder with no spouse or partner present and 20.0% had a male householder with no spouse or partner present. 36.7% of all households were non-families. 33.3% of all households were made up of individuals, 13.3% had someone living alone who was 65 years old or older.

The median age in the community was 45.0 years. 23.0% of the residents were under the age of 20; 2.7% were between the ages of 20 and 24; 24.3% were from 25 and 44; 24.3% were from 45 and 64; and 25.7% were 65 years of age or older. The gender makeup of the community was 39.2% male and 60.8% female.

=== 2020 census ===
As of the 2010 census, there were 85 people, 32 households, and 26 families residing in the town. The population density was 184.38 inhabitants per square mile (71.19/km^{2}). There were 34 housing units at an average density of 73.75 per square mile (28.48/km^{2}). The racial makeup of the town was 98.82% White and 1.18% from two or more races. Of the total population, 4.7% were Hispanic or Latino of any race.

== History ==
The town of California Junction traces its origins to the Yazoo post office and the ill-fated towns of Cincinnati and Parrish City, which were founded in Cincinnati township during the later half of the 1850s. Yazoo Landing was a ferry crossing on the Missouri River where the Blair Bridge now stands. The present settlement was established in 1880, after the Sioux City and Pacific Railroad was built. John I. Blair, the railroad tycoon, believed that this would be an important hub for passengers heading west, and gave the town its current name. In 1883, the name of the town was changed to "California" to avoid confusion with Columbia Junction; it retained this name as of 1915.

In 1879, California Junction had a population of 200 people; the population was 76 in 1902. In 1903, the California Grain and Lumber Company was organized in California Junction. By 1915, there was also a town hall, high school, general store, blacksmith shop, post office, two churches, and a train station.

On January 1, 1922, a 1460-foot deep well was drilled at the nearby oil prospect of Hugh R. Coulthard, a prominent landowner, businessman, and farmer from California Junction. No oil was obtained from the site, but the capped well leaks water to this day. A marshy area surrounding the well remains as a local landmark, which is visible about 160 yards north of town on Fremont Ave., about 30 yards west of the roadway.

In 1925, California Junction's population was 84. The population was 100 in 1940.

A grain elevator is still operated at California Junction by the United Western Coop.

== Education ==
The community of California Junction and the surrounding rural area educational needs are met by the Missouri Valley Community School District.

== Notable people ==
- James F. O'Connor (1878–1945) U.S. Representative of Montana
