= List of bridges documented by the Historic American Engineering Record in Nebraska =

This is a list of bridges documented by the Historic American Engineering Record in the U.S. state of Nebraska.

== Bridges ==
Survey No.	Name (as assigned by HAER)	Status	Type	Built	Documented	Carries	Crosses	Location	County	Coordinates
IA-1	Pacific Shortline Bridge	Replaced	Rim-bearing swing span	1896	1980	US 77	Missouri River	South Sioux City, Nebraska, and Sioux City, Iowa	Dakota County, Nebraska, and Woodbury County, Iowa	42°29′15″N 96°24′49″W
NE-1	Abraham Lincoln Memorial Bridge	Replaced	Pennsylvania truss	1929	1987	US 30	Missouri River	Blair, Nebraska, and California Junction, Iowa	Washington County, Nebraska, and Harrison County, Iowa	41°33′04″N 96°05′44″W
NE-2	Nebraska City Bridge	Demolished	Whipple truss	1888	1986	Chicago, Burlington and Quincy Railroad	Missouri River	Nebraska City, Nebraska, and Percival, Iowa	Otoe County, Nebraska, and Fremont County, Iowa	40°40′27″N 95°50′14″W
NE-4	Rulo Bridge (Note: See also HAER No. NE-2, "Nebraska City Bridge" for additional documentation)	Replaced	Whipple truss	1887	1986	Chicago, Burlington and Quincy Railroad	Missouri River	Rulo, Nebraska, and Big Lake, Missouri	Richardson County, Nebraska, and Holt County, Missouri	40°03′16″N 95°25′15″W
NE-5; IA-67	Plattsmouth Bridge	Extant	Cantilever	1929	1986	US 34	Missouri River	Plattsmouth, Nebraska, and Pacific Junction, Iowa	Cass County, Nebraska, and Mills County, Iowa	41°00′04″N 95°52′00″W
NE-6	Omaha Bridge	Replaced	Whipple truss	1887	1986	Union Pacific Railroad	Missouri River	Omaha, Nebraska, and Council Bluffs, Iowa	Douglas County, Nebraska, and Pottawattamie County, Iowa	41°14′59″N 95°55′02″W
NE-7	Blair Crossing Bridge	Replaced	Whipple truss	1883	1986	Union Pacific Railroad	Missouri River	Blair, Nebraska, and California Junction, Iowa	Washington County, Nebraska, and Harrison County, Iowa	41°33′05″N 96°05′44″W
NE-10-D	South Omaha Union Stock Yards, Buckingham Road Viaduct	Demolished	Steel built-up girder	1924	1999	29th Street	Union Stockyards cattle pens	Omaha	Douglas	41°12′39″N 95°57′20″W
NE-10-E	South Omaha Union Stock Yards, O Street Viaduct	Demolished	Pratt truss	1904	1999	O Street	Union Stockyards hog pens	Omaha	Douglas	41°12′30″N 95°57′05″W
