= Eastern Midlands Conference =

Logo of the Eastern Midlands Conference New Logo - 2013-

The Eastern Midlands Conference is a high school athletic conference serving suburban and suburban-small town high schools in Eastern Nebraska.

School Locations in Nebraska

== History ==
Throughout its history, the EMC, as the conference is usually abbreviated, has only contained schools that compete in Class B Athletics, and Class A or B music, according to NSAA regulations. The formation came from the dissolution of the Twin-Rivers Conference (TRC) in 1979. Four of the schools in the TRC, Nebraska City, Blair, Plattsmouth, and Syracuse decided to form a new, eight-team conference. Platteview decided to leave its conference and join with these schools. Several smaller schools in Eastern Nebraska had just seen influxes in enrollment and had thus become eligible Class B schools. These schools were Elkhorn, Gretna, Norris, and Waverly. Eight of these teams joined in 1980 to form the EMC, Syracuse High School being pushed out of the conference. In 2011, Elkhorn School District founded a new school, Elkhorn South High School, which became the ninth member of the EMC. Most recently, Platteview High School, perhaps due to a decrease in school enrollment, decided to leave the EMC and join the Capitol Conference, which includes Syracuse. Bennington of the Capitol Conference left their conference at the same time, and joined the EMC. Elkhorn North joined the conference with its opening in 2020. In 2023, the EMC added 3 news schools including Hastings High School, Lincoln Northwest High School, and Standing Bear High School. However, Lincoln Northwest and Standing Bear will both leave the conference to join the Heartland Athletic Conference, while Bennington and Elkhorn North will leave for the Metro Athletic Conference starting in the 2026-27 fall sports season.

== Member schools ==
| Institution | Location | Colors | Enrollment (2019–20) | Mascot | Class |
|---|---|---|---|---|---|
| Blair | Blair | | 527 | Bears | B |
| Elkhorn | Elkhorn | | 698 | Antlers | B |
| Gretna | Gretna | | 379 | Dragons | B |
| Gretna East | Gretna | | 411 | Griffins | B |
| Norris | Firth | | 537 | Titans | B |
| Hastings | Hastings | | TBD | Tigers | B |
| Waverly | Waverly | | 451 | Vikings | B |

=== Former members ===
| Institution | Location | Colors | Joined | Left | Mascot | Class |
|---|---|---|---|---|---|---|
| Bennington | Bennington | | August 2005 | May 2026 | Badgers | A |
| Elkhorn North | Elkhorn | | August 2020 | May 2026 | Wolves | A |
| Lincoln Northwest | Lincoln | | August 2022 | May 2026 | Falcons | A |
| Standing Bear | Lincoln | | August 2023 | May 2026 | Grizzlies | A |

=== Membership timeline ===
Member Original TRC Member Capitol Conference Metro Conference
