= Bennington High School =

Bennington High School may refer to:

- Bennington High School (Bennington, Nebraska) in Bennington, Nebraska
- Bennington High School (Bennington, Kansas) in Bennington, Kansas
- Bennington High School (Bennington, Oklahoma) in Bennington, Oklahoma
- Bennington High School (Bennington, Vermont) in Bennington, Vermont
