= Blair High School =

Blair High School may refer to one of the following high schools in the United States:

- Montgomery Blair High School in Silver Spring, Maryland
- Blair High School (Blair, Nebraska) in Blair, Nebraska
- Blair High School (Blair, Oklahoma) in Blair, Oklahoma
- Blair-Taylor High School in Blair, Wisconsin
- Blair Center Hattiesburg High School in Hattiesburg, Mississippi
- Blair Oaks High School, Blair Oaks R-II School District, Jefferson City, Missouri
- Blair International Baccalaureate School in Pasadena, California
