= Sioux City & Pacific Railroad Co. v. Stout =

Sioux City & Pacific R.R. Co. v. Stout
- Supreme Court of the United States

Decided January 26, 1874
- Full case name: Sioux City & Pacific R.R. Co. v. Stout
- Citations: 84 U.S. 657 (more) 17 Wall. 657; 21 L. Ed. 745

Court membership
- Chief Justice vacant Associate Justices Nathan Clifford · Noah H. Swayne; Samuel F. Miller · David Davis; Stephen J. Field · William Strong; Joseph P. Bradley · Ward Hunt

Case opinion
- Majority: Hunt, joined by unanimous

Sioux City & Pacific Railroad Co. v. Stout, 84 U.S. (17 Wall.) 657 (1873), was a case decided by the Supreme Court of the United States that first enunciated the idea that a landowner could be liable for the injuries of a child trespasser.

== Background ==
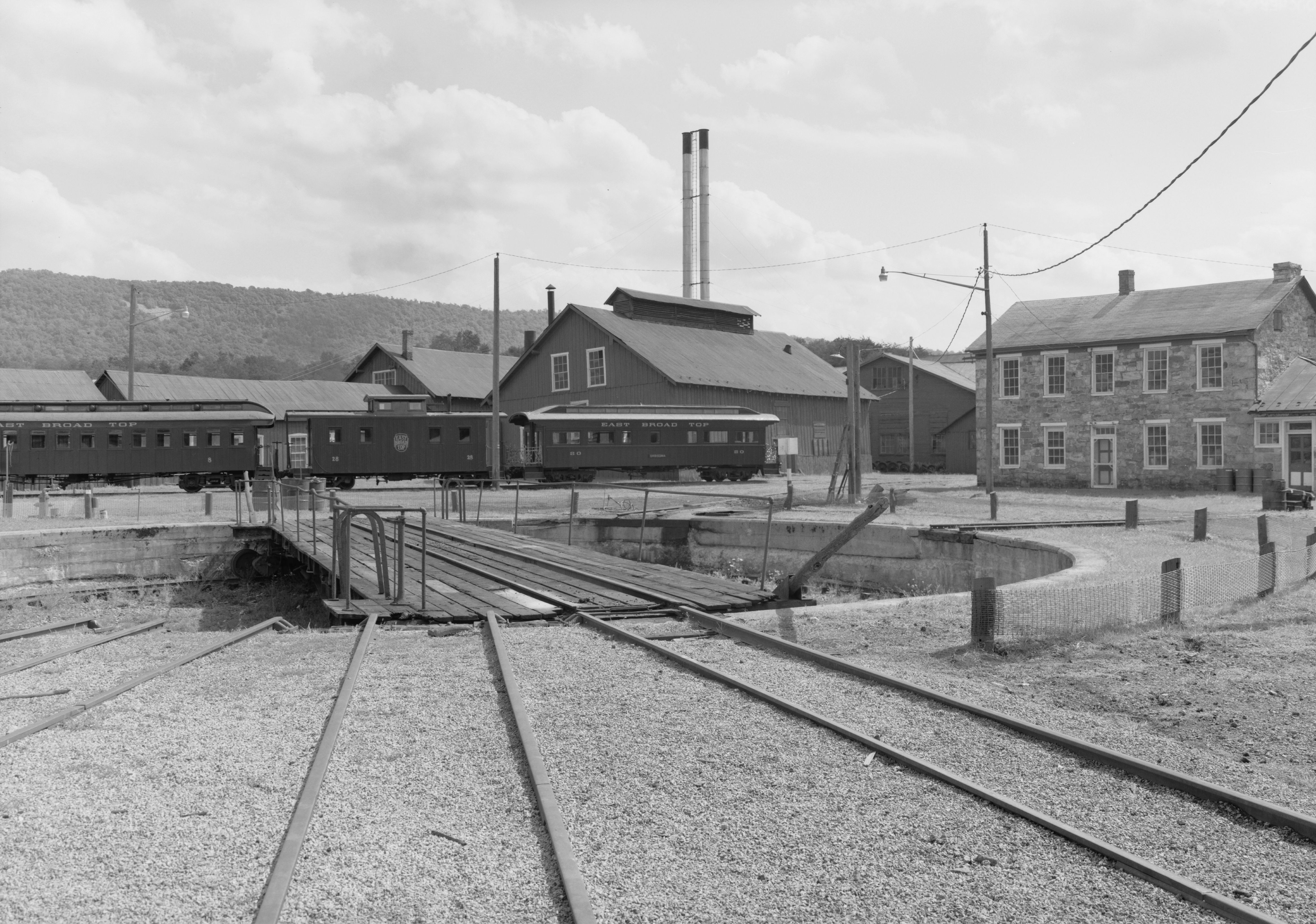
A railroad turntable similar to this one was thought to breach the duty to children trespassers because it induced them to trespass. The original turntable was torn down in the late 1890s.

On March 29, 1869, a small child was injured by a railroad turntable owned by Sioux City and Pacific Railroad, which was being operated in Blair, Nebraska. The child was playing on the turntable, which injured his/her foot. The father took the company to court in the federal Circuit Court for the District of Nebraska. After a first jury trial failed to reach a decision, a second jury awarded the father $7,500 in 1872. The railroad then sought a writ of error from the Supreme Court.

== Decision ==
A child was injured by a railroad turntable owned by Sioux City and Pacific Railroad, which was being operated in Blair, Nebraska. Sioux City & Pacific Railroad company was held liable, despite the prevailing idea that a landowner was not held liable for injuries to trespassers. Trespassing children were thought to be a special case that required a higher duty of care. This theory of liability came to be known as the "turntable doctrine" and later the attractive nuisance doctrine by the case Keffe v. Milwaukee & St. Paul R.R. Co.

== See also ==
- Chicago B. & Q.R. Co. v. Krayenbuhl: A similar case
- List of United States Supreme Court cases, volume 84
- Blair, Nebraska
