= Scott Lautenbaugh =

American politician (1964–2023)

Member of the Nebraska Legislature from the 18th district
- In office 2007 – November 2014
- Preceded by: Mick Mines
- Succeeded by: Brett Lindstrom

Personal details
- Born: November 11, 1964 Sioux City, Iowa, U.S.
- Died: December 16, 2023 (aged 59) Omaha, Nebraska, U.S.
- Party: Republican
- Education: Creighton University

Scott Alan Lautenbaugh (November 11, 1964 – December 16, 2023) was an American politician from the state of Nebraska. He served in the Nebraska Legislature from 2007 to 2014, representing Omaha-based district 18.

== Career ==
He graduated from Omaha South High School in 1983. There, he was named as a semifinalist in the National Merit Scholarship Program. He subsequently graduated from Creighton University with a B.A. in 1987 after studying Economics, Political Science, History, and Philosophy, and with a J.D. from the Creighton School of Law in 1991.

After law school, he worked as an attorney for various law firms. He was a member of Omaha Barristers, being its president from 2000 to 2001.

He was the Chief Deputy Election Commissioner for Douglas County from 1996 to 2000, then Election Commissioner from 2000 to 2003. During his term as Election Commissioner, he was sued by former State Senator Ernie Chambers and won.

After Mick Mines resigned in October 2007 from being State Senator for Legislative District 18, Governor Dave Heineman appointed Lautenbaugh on November 2, 2007, to replace Mines. He then won a 2008 special election and a 2010 regular election, both against Carl Lorenzen. He was chairperson of the Rules Committee, and served on the Transportation and Telecommunications; General Affairs; Government, Military and Veterans Affairs; and Urban Affairs committees. He resigned on November 6, 2014, at age 49, being unable to run again due to term limits and planning to go into lobbying, and was replaced by Brett Lindstrom.

He was a "dyed in the wool" Republican, supporting personal liberty and small businesses, opposing government overreach, and refusing to take directions from any person or organization. He successfully championed an exception for cigar bars in Nebraska's smoking ban. He filed a petition with the Nebraska Supreme Court to remove the requirement that attorneys licensed in Nebraska be members of the Nebraska State Bar Association, resulting in the court deciding to limit how the Bar Association can spend money it receives from mandatory membership dues and assessments.

== Personal life ==
Scott Alan Lautenbaugh was born on November 11, 1964, in Sioux City, Iowa to Dean and Janis Lautenbaugh. His family moved to Omaha in 1970.

He lived in northwest Douglas County. He was a member of St. Andrew's United Methodist Church.

While working at a law firm at age 27, he met Shelly, and married her 3 years later, on June 3, 1995. With her, he had a stepson named Spencer (b. 1990, now age 35–36) and twin sons Nathan and Kyle (b. 1999, now age 26–27). He was later in a relationship with Laura Nelson, who already had a daughter named Sarah.

On February 27, 2013, he was cited for DUI near 147th Street and West Maple Road in Omaha. His blood-alcohol level was .234, which is nearly three times the legal limit in Nebraska. In June 2013, he was sentenced to 2 days in jail, a year's probation, and a $500 fine. Exactly ten years later, he posted on Facebook stating that he regrets his drinking and driving.

He had a dog named Jack and a cat named Rocky.

He died on December 16, 2023, at age 59.
