= Omaha Structural Steel Works =

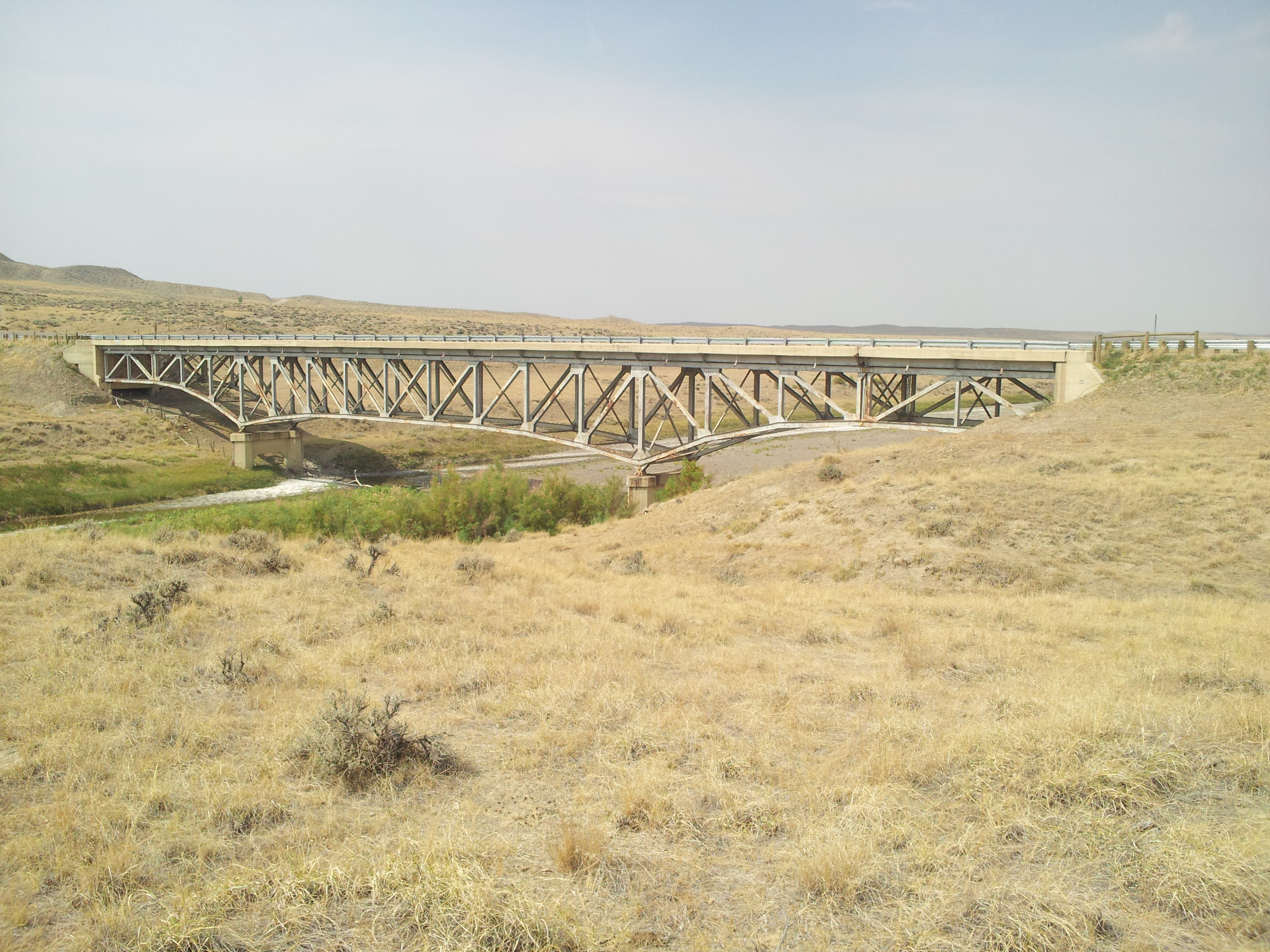
AJX Bridge

Omaha Steel, a subsidiary of Owens Industries, is a steel casting company located in Wahoo, Nebraska. The company was founded in Omaha in 1906 and has previously been known as Omaha Structural Steel Works, Omaha Steel Works and Omaha Structural Steel Bridge Co.

In 2019, Omaha Steel was acquired by Owen Industries, Inc. and has been operating as a division of that company since.

A number of its works are listed in the U.S. National Register of Historic Places.

Works include (with variations in attribution):

- AJX Bridge over South Fork and Powder River, I-25 W. Service Rd. (old hwy 87), Kaycee, Wyoming (Omaha Steel Works), NRHP-listed
- Columbus Loup River Bridge, US 30 over the Loup R., Columbus, Nebraska (Omaha Steel Works), NRHP-listed
- Lake Zumbro Hydroelectric Generating Plant, off Co. Hwy. 21 at N end of Lake Zumbro, Mazeppa Township, Mazeppa, Minnesota (Omaha Structural Steel Bridge Co.), NRHP-listed
- Main Street Bridge, Main St. over W. Papillion Cr., Elkhorn, Nebraska (Omaha Structural Steel Works), NRHP-listed
- Ocean to Ocean Bridge, Penitentiary Ave, Yuma, Arizona (Omaha Structural Steel Works), NRHP-listed
- Plattsmouth Bridge, US 34 over the Missouri R., Pacific Junction, Iowa, and Plattsmouth, Nebraska (Omaha Structural Steel Works), NRHP-listed
- Red Cloud Bridge, NE 281 over the Republican R., 2 mi. S of Red Cloud, Red Cloud, Nebraska (Omaha Steel Works), NRHP-listed
- St. Joseph Bridge, 4.4 mi. SE of Joseph City on Joseph City-Holbrook Rd., Joseph City, Arizona (Omaha Structural Steel Works), NRHP-listed
- Woodruff Bridge, 4 mi. S of Woodruff on Woodruff-Snowflake Rd., Woodruff, Arizona (Omaha Structural Steel Works), NRHP-listed

== Shipyard ==
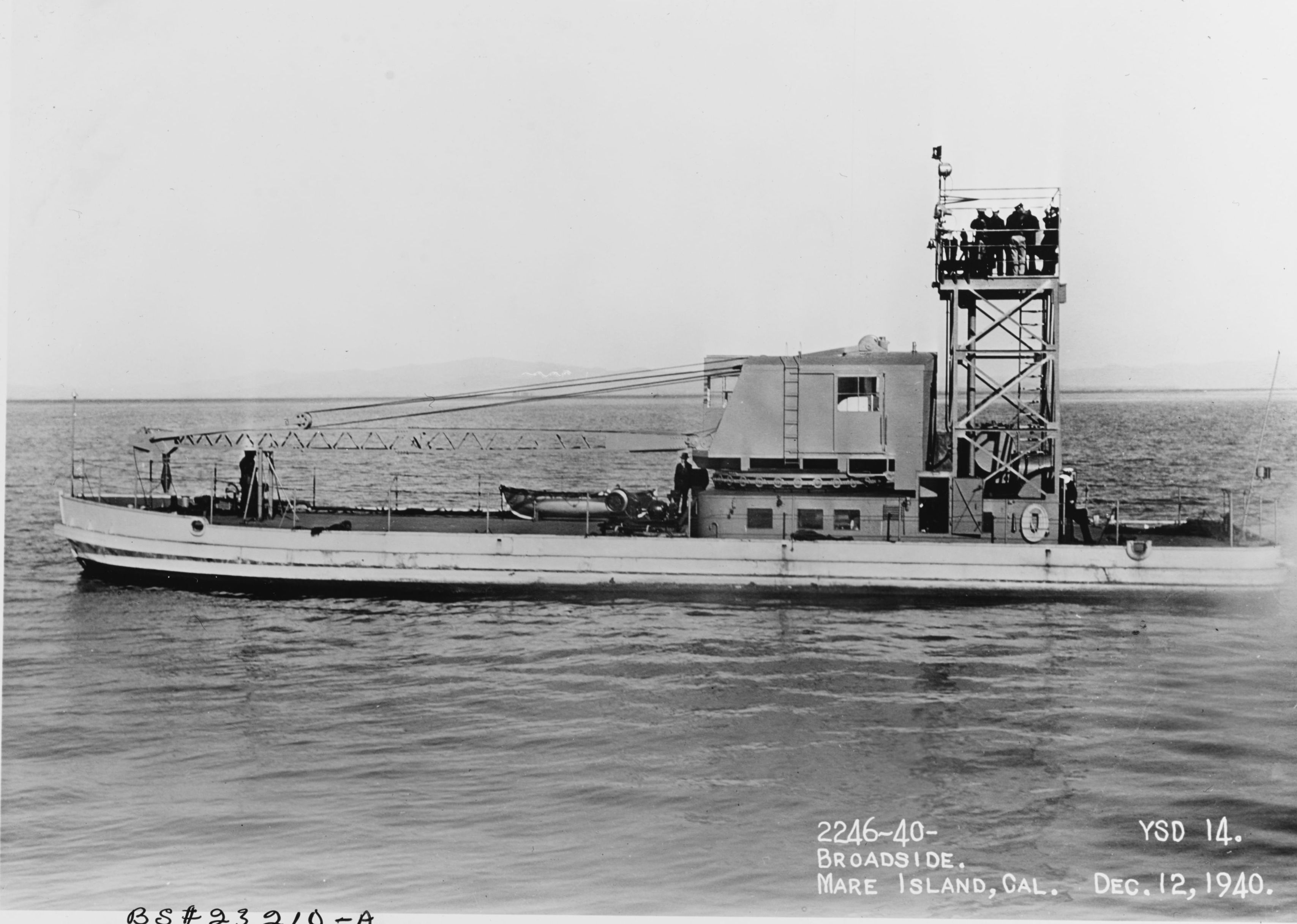
Seaplane Wrecking Derrick - YSD

For World War 2 in 1944 Omaha Steel Works built YSD-11 Class Seaplane Wrecking Derrick, Hull classification symbol YSD is for Yard Seaplane Dirrick, Yard as in ship repair yard:

- YSD 66
- YSD 67
- YSD 68
- YSD 69
