= Eric Nguyen =

American meteorologist

Eric Michael Nguyen
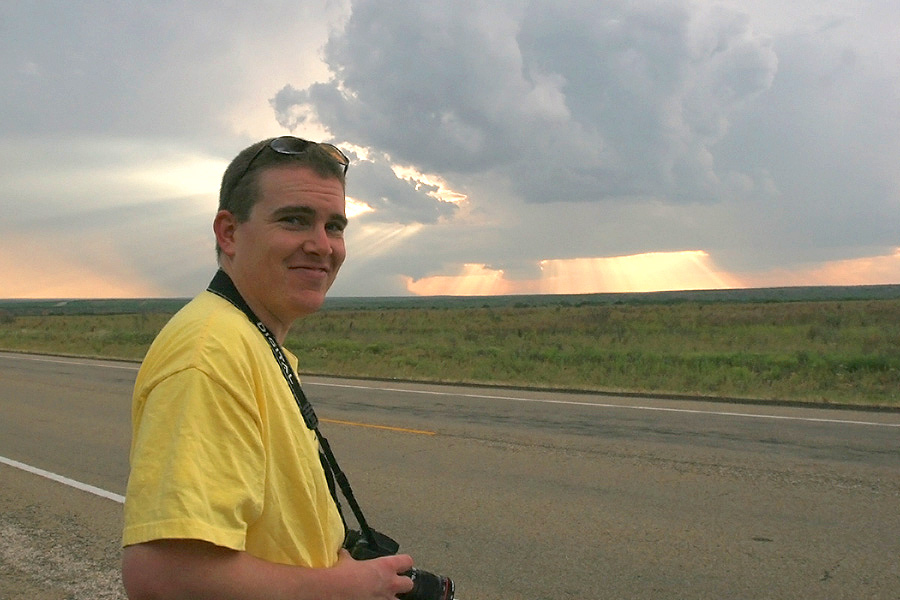
- Eric Nguyen in West Texas, 2007
- Born: January 2, 1978; Newport Beach, California, USA
- Died: September 9, 2007 (aged 29); Arlington, Texas, USA
- Education: University of Oklahoma (B.S., 2005)
- Known for: Tornado and storm photography, storm chaser
- Scientific career
- Fields: Storm chasing, Photography, Meteorology

Eric Michael Nguyen (January 2, 1978 – September 9, 2007) was an American professional storm chaser, meteorologist, and photographer from Keller, Texas, United States. In 2008, Nguyen released his first book of photography titled Adventures in Tornado Alley: The Storm Chasers with co-author Mike Hollingshead.

== Early life and education ==
Eric Michael Isbell (last name changed to Nguyen after marriage) was born in Newport Beach, California, near Los Angeles, California, in 1978 and raised in Keller, Texas, after his parents relocated soon after his birth. Eric was strongly interested in severe storms and tornadoes as a child and became heavily intrigued with mobile instrumentation systems for weather data collection. Eric began studying meteorology at the University of Oklahoma (OU) in 2001. He graduated with a B.S. degree in meteorology in May 2005.

== Career ==
In 1994, Nguyen began chasing storms in Texas and soon expanded his range to the larger area of the central United States commonly known as Tornado Alley. Nguyen began publishing images regularly in Accord Publishing's popular annual Weather Guide Calendar series, Smithsonian Magazine, NASA's Astronomy Picture of the Day, as well as Weatherwise, Storm Track, UCAR Quarterly, textbooks, and other venues. His Mulvane, Kansas, image of white tornado with a rainbow is one of the most frequently licensed tornado images of all time and several other of his photos have appeared in publications and presentations around the world. Nguyen's storm and tornado photography was considered among the most expressive in the field, with a particular emphasis on unusual palettes and the use of foreground elements to create dynamic line structures in the composition. On April 21, 2007, Nguyen and his storm chasing partner, Amos Magliocco, were struck by a tornado in Tulia, Texas. Nguyen's scientific grade weather instrumentation survived the hit and arguably measured the sharpest pressure fall ever recorded on Earth. Upon his death, hundreds of weather enthusiasts from around the world praised Nguyen's skills as a photographer and chaser in the online journal Storm Track The University of Oklahoma hosted a memorial tribute ceremony in the National Weather Center (NWC) on September 22, 2007. The keynote speaker was Dr. Charles A. Doswell III. An endowed scholarship for graduate and undergraduate meteorology students was created in Nguyen's name at OU's prestigious School of Meteorology (SoM). Nguyen's imagery is represented by the stock photo agency Corbis Int'l which notes that the Mulvane, Kansas tornado image is "Widely considered among stormchasers as the greatest tornado photo of all time..." A five-week exhibition of Nguyen's photography was held at the Todd/Browning Gallery in Los Angeles from March 15-April 23.

== Death ==
Nguyen died in Arlington, Texas, on September 9, 2007, as a result of injuries sustained during a suicide attempt on August 27, 2007. Nguyen suffered a sudden relapse of a mental illness and experienced severe negative reactions to anti-depressant medication.

== Publications ==
Nguyen authored and coauthored scientific publications and conference papers as well as the photography book, Adventures in Tornado Alley: The Storm Chasers. Publications include:

- Nguyen, Eric; Mike Hollingshead (2008). Adventures in Tornado Alley: The Storm Chasers. Thames & Hudson. pp. 187 p. : ill. (some col.), maps, 20 x 25 cm. ISBN 978-0-500-51404-7. OCLC 181139459.
- Richard Ferrare, Edward Browell, Syed Ismail, Susan Kooi, Vince Brackett, Hank Revercomb, Bob Knuteson, Paolo Antonelli, Noah Misch, Jonathan Gleason, Eric Nguyen, Scott Currens, 2004: Airborne Lidar Measurements of Water Vapor and Aerosol Fields Over The Southern Great Plains During IHOP Field Experiment. 22nd International Laser Radar Conference, Metera, Italy.
- Victoria Sankovich, G. Shaw, J. Gleason, S. Newsome, E. Nguyen, R. A. Ferrare, E. V. Browell, S. Ismail, S. Kooi, V. G. Brackett, H. Revercomb, B. Knuteson, and P. Antonelli, 2004: Characterization and Visualization of Water Vapor and Atmospheric Stability During the IHOP Field Experiment. 2nd Symposium on Lidar Atmospheric Applications, San Diego, CA.
- Blair, S. F., and E. M. Nguyen, 2005: An examination of the 12 June 2004 Mulvane, Kansas tornado. Preprints, 4th Annual Southeast Severe Storms Symposium, Starkville, Mississippi, CD-ROM.
