= Plattsmouth Bridge =

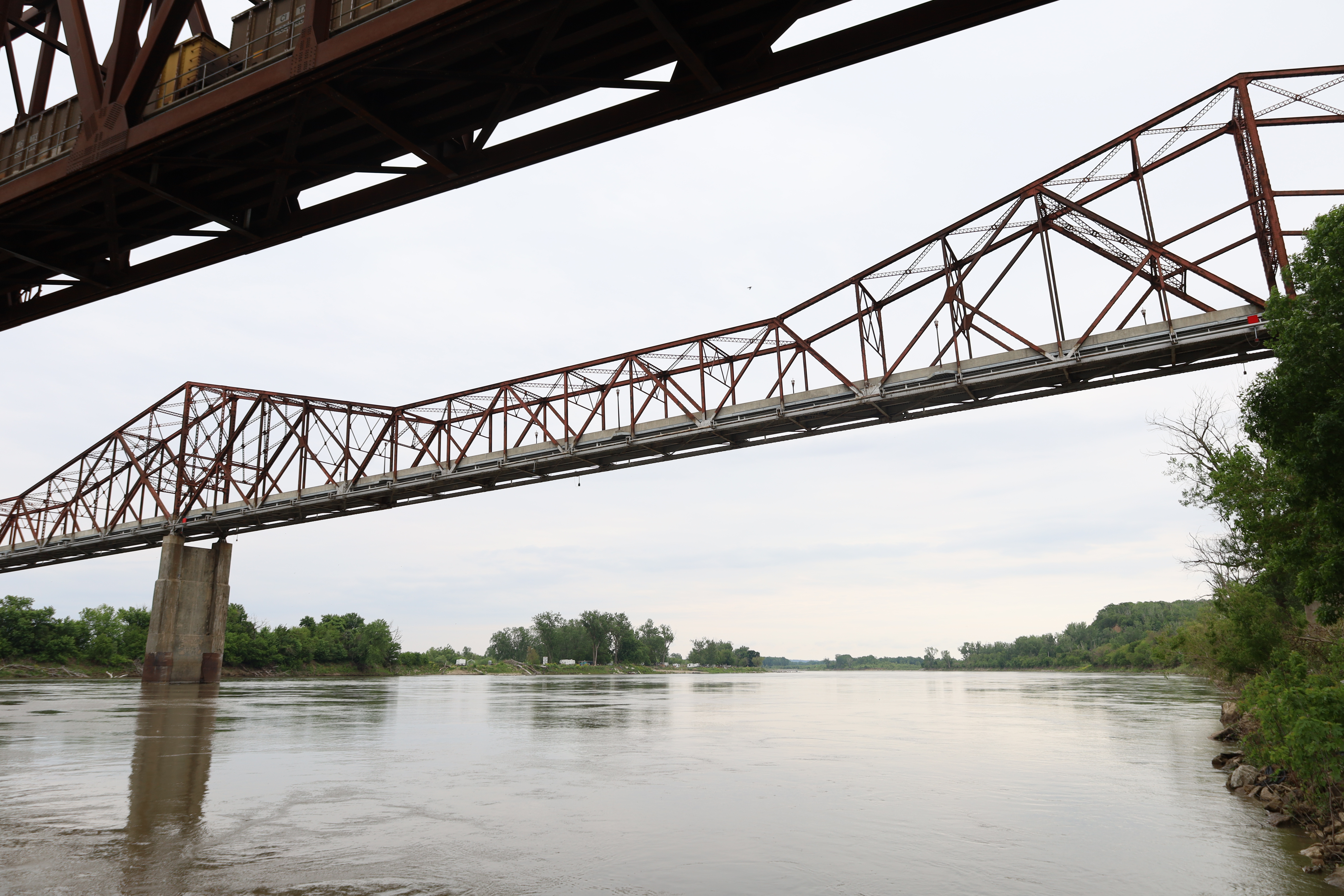
- The bridge in 2025
- Coordinates: 41°0′4″N 95°52′0″W
- Crosses: Missouri River
- Locale: Cass County, Nebraska and Mills County, Iowa
- Owner: Plattsmouth, Nebraska

Characteristics
- Design: Truss
- Material: Steel

History
- Opened: 1929

Statistics
- Toll: $1.75
- Plattsmouth Bridge
- U.S. National Register of Historic Places
- Location within Nebraska Location within the United States
- Built by: Omaha Structural Steel Works
- Architectural style: Cantlevered through truss
- MPS: Highway Bridges in Nebraska MPS
- NRHP reference No.: 92000755
- Added to NRHP: April 15, 1993

Location
- Interactive map of Plattsmouth Bridge

The Plattsmouth Bridge is a truss bridge over the Missouri River connecting Cass County, Nebraska, and Mills County, Iowa at Plattsmouth, Nebraska. Until 2014, it carried U.S. Highway 34 across the river.

== Description ==
The bridge has seven spans, including the 402-foot (123 m) cantilevered through truss over the river's navigable channel. It is anchored by 201-foot (61 m) through spans, with two 203-foot (62 m) and two 104-foot (32 m) deck trusses over the eastern flood plain. The bridge has clearance of 14 feet 5 inches (4.39 m) and a width of 20 feet (6.1 m).

== History ==
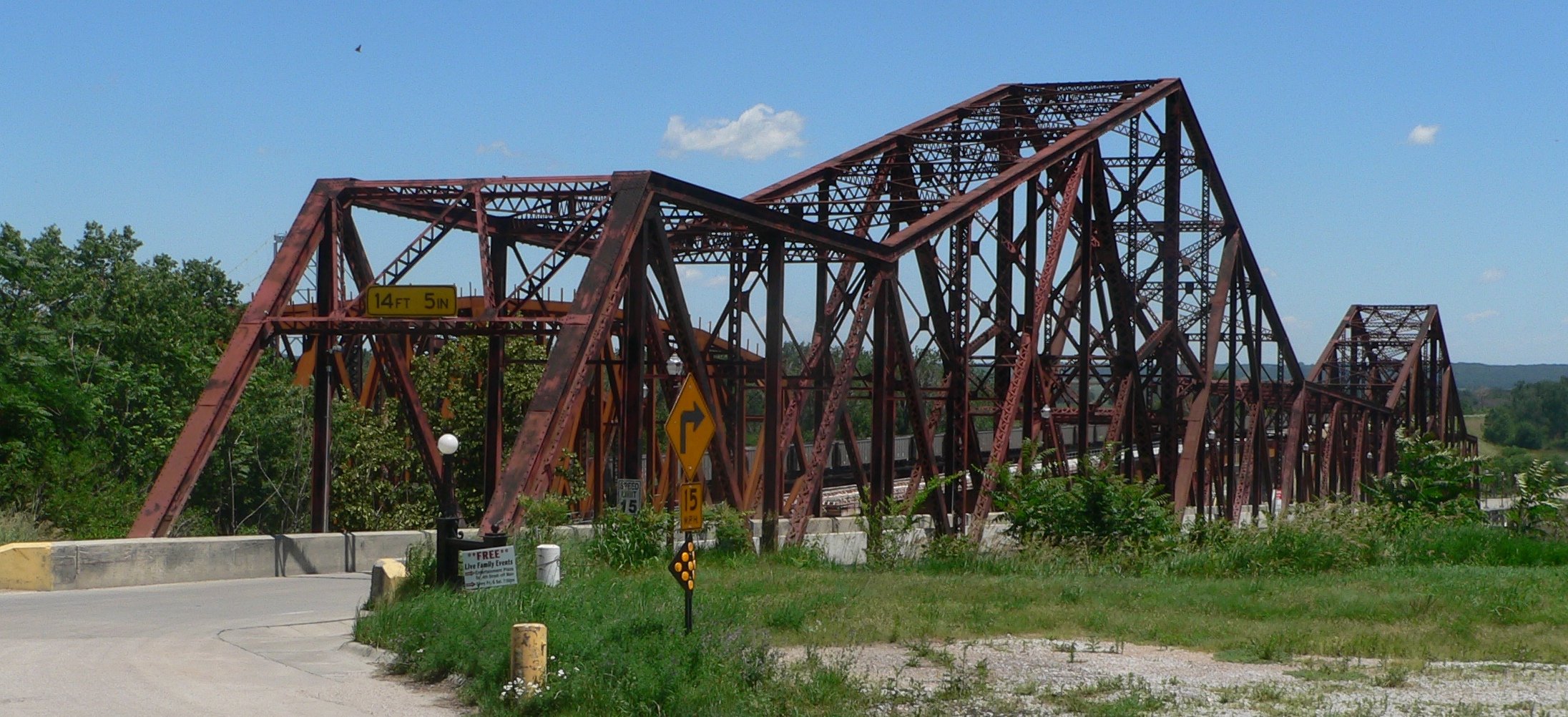
View from Nebraska side in 2013

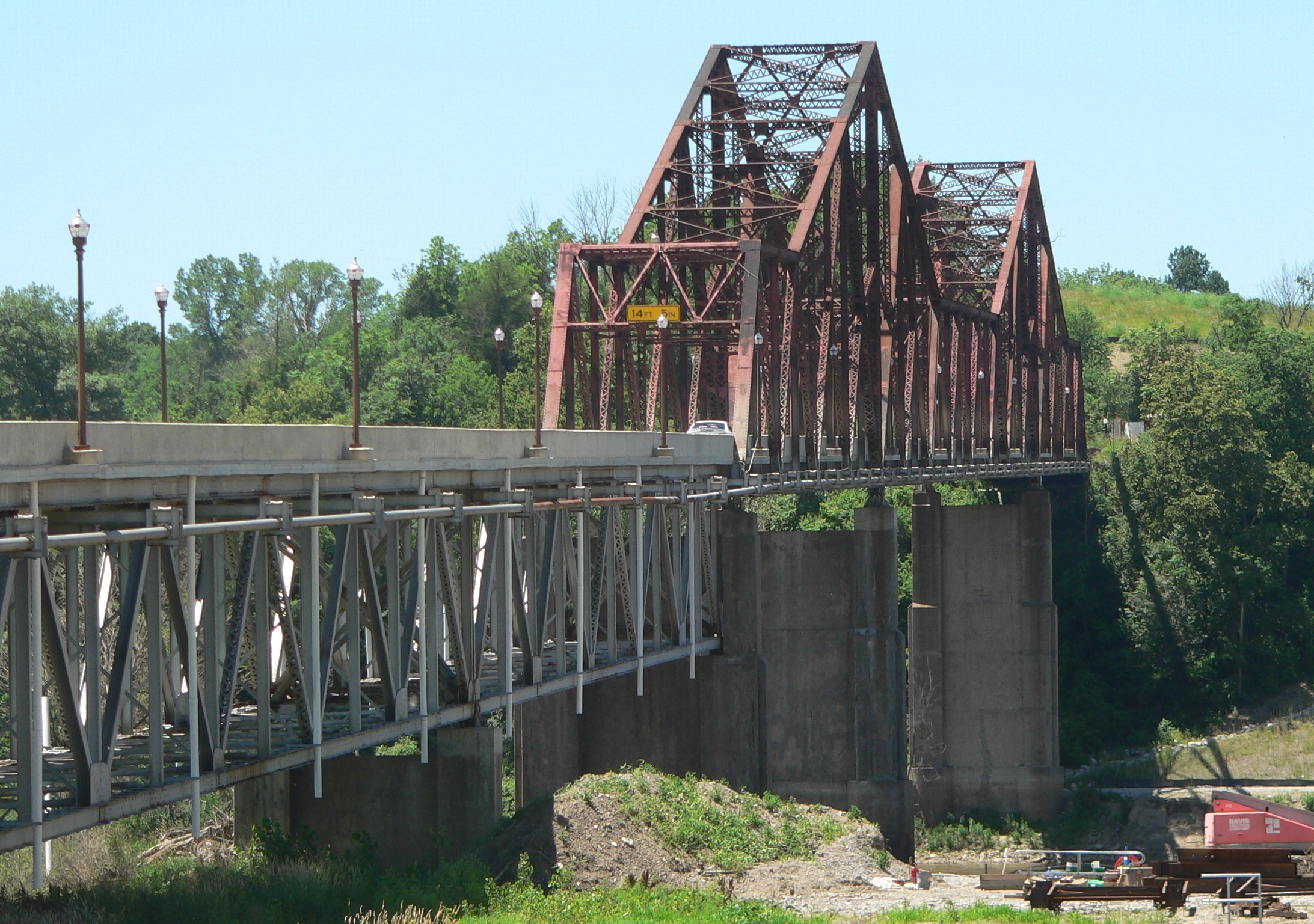
Iowa approach to the bridge in 2013

The bridge was built in 1929, replacing a ferry that previously operated at the site. It was designed by the Omaha Structural Steel Works.

In November 2006 it was decided to repair the bridge rather than build new bridges. Earlier plans had called for a new $42 million two-lane bridge and bypass of Plattsmouth. The new bridge would have been about 300 feet (91 m) south of the existing one.

In November 2007, ownership of the bridge was transferred from the private Plattsmouth Bridge company to the public Plattsmouth Bridge Commission. Between April 21, 2008, and November 9, 2008, the bridge was closed as part of a federally funded bridge restoration. The bridge reopened November 9, 2008. As of 2011, the toll for cars was $1.25. In 2018, the toll for cars was raised to $1.75.

In 2014, Highway 34 was rerouted to a new four-lane bridge farther upstream, north of the Platte River and above its junction with the Missouri.

Structural repairs were completed in 2018, allowing the weight limit to be increased to 40,000 pounds (20 tons); the toll was increased to $1.75.

== See also ==
- List of bridges documented by the Historic American Engineering Record in Iowa
- List of bridges documented by the Historic American Engineering Record in Nebraska
- List of crossings of the Missouri River
