= List of United States Supreme Court cases, volume 84 =

Supreme Court of the United States
- Interactive map of Supreme Court of the United States
- 38°53′26″N 77°00′16″W
- Established: March 4, 1789; 236 years ago
- Location: Washington, D.C.
- Coordinates: 38°53′26″N 77°00′16″W
- Composition method: Presidential nomination with Senate confirmation
- Authorised by: Constitution of the United States, Art. III, § 1
- Judge term length: life tenure, subject to impeachment and removal
- Number of positions: 9 (by statute)
- Website: supremecourt.gov

This is a list of cases reported in volume 84 (17 Wall.) of United States Reports, decided by the Supreme Court of the United States in 1873.

== Nominative reports ==
In 1874, the U.S. government created the United States Reports, and retroactively numbered older privately published case reports as part of the new series. As a result, cases appearing in volumes 1–90 of U.S. Reports have dual citation forms; one for the volume number of U.S. Reports, and one for the volume number of the reports named for the relevant reporter of decisions (these are called "nominative reports").

=== John William Wallace ===
Starting with the 66th volume of U.S. Reports, the Reporter of Decisions of the Supreme Court of the United States was John William Wallace. Wallace was Reporter of Decisions from 1863 to 1874, covering volumes 68 through 90 of United States Reports which correspond to volumes 1 through 23 of his Wallace's Reports. As such, the dual form of citation to, for example, Tyler v. Magwire is 84 U.S. (17 Wall.) 253 (1873).

Wallace's Reports were the final nominative reports for the US Supreme Court; starting with volume 91, cases were identified simply as "(volume #) U.S. (page #) (year)".

== Justices of the Supreme Court at the time of 84 U.S. (17 Wall.) ==
The Supreme Court is established by Article III, Section 1 of the Constitution of the United States, which says: "The judicial Power of the United States, shall be vested in one supreme Court . . .". The size of the Court is not specified; the Constitution leaves it to Congress to set the number of justices. Under the Judiciary Act of 1789 Congress originally fixed the number of justices at six (one chief justice and five associate justices). Since 1789 Congress has varied the size of the Court from six to seven, nine, ten, and back to nine justices (always including one chief justice).

When the 1873 cases in 84 U.S. (17 Wall.) were decided the Court comprised the following nine members:

=== Justices during at least part of the Court session reported in 84 U.S. (17 Wall.) ===
Portrait	Justice	Office	Home State	Succeeded	Date confirmed by the Senate (Vote)	Tenure on Supreme Court
	Salmon P. Chase	Chief Justice	Ohio	Roger B. Taney	December 6, 1864 (Acclamation)	December 15, 1864 – May 7, 1873 (Died)
	Nathan Clifford	Associate Justice	Maine	Benjamin Robbins Curtis	January 12, 1858 (26–23)	January 21, 1858 – July 25, 1881 (Died)
	Noah Haynes Swayne	Associate Justice	Ohio	John McLean	January 24, 1862 (38–1)	January 27, 1862 – January 24, 1881 (Retired)
	Samuel Freeman Miller	Associate Justice	Iowa	Peter Vivian Daniel	July 16, 1862 (Acclamation)	July 21, 1862 – October 13, 1890 (Died)
	David Davis	Associate Justice	Illinois	John Archibald Campbell	December 8, 1862 (Acclamation)	December 10, 1862 – March 4, 1877 (Resigned)
	Stephen Johnson Field	Associate Justice	California	newly created seat	March 10, 1863 (Acclamation)	May 10, 1863 – December 1, 1897 (Retired)
	William Strong	Associate Justice	Pennsylvania	Robert Cooper Grier	February 18, 1870 (No vote recorded)	March 14, 1870 – December 14, 1880 (Retired)
	Joseph P. Bradley	Associate Justice	New Jersey	newly created seat	March 21, 1870 (46–9)	March 23, 1870 – January 22, 1892 (Died)
	Ward Hunt	Associate Justice	New York	Samuel Nelson	December 11, 1872 (Acclamation)	January 9, 1873 – January 27, 1882 (Retired)

== Citation style ==
Under the Judiciary Act of 1789 the federal court structure at the time comprised District Courts, which had general trial jurisdiction; Circuit Courts, which had mixed trial and appellate (from the US District Courts) jurisdiction; and the United States Supreme Court, which had appellate jurisdiction over the federal District and Circuit courts—and for certain issues over state courts. The Supreme Court also had limited original jurisdiction (i.e., in which cases could be filed directly with the Supreme Court without first having been heard by a lower federal or state court). There were one or more federal District Courts and/or Circuit Courts in each state, territory, or other geographical region.

Bluebook citation style is used for case names, citations, and jurisdictions.

- "C.C.D." = United States Circuit Court for the District of . . .
  - e.g.,"C.C.D.N.J." = United States Circuit Court for the District of New Jersey
- "D." = United States District Court for the District of . . .
  - e.g.,"D. Mass." = United States District Court for the District of Massachusetts
- "E." = Eastern; "M." = Middle; "N." = Northern; "S." = Southern; "W." = Western
  - e.g.,"C.C.S.D.N.Y." = United States Circuit Court for the Southern District of New York
  - e.g.,"M.D. Ala." = United States District Court for the Middle District of Alabama
- "Ct. Cl." = United States Court of Claims
- The abbreviation of a state's name alone indicates the highest appellate court in that state's judiciary at the time.
  - e.g.,"Pa." = Supreme Court of Pennsylvania
  - e.g.,"Me." = Supreme Judicial Court of Maine

== List of cases in 84 U.S. (17 Wall.) ==
Case Name	Page & year	Opinion of the Court	Concurring opinion(s)	Dissenting opinion(s)	Lower Court	Disposition
Cordova v. Hood	1 (1873)	Strong	none	none	C.C.W.D. Tex.	reversed
United States v. Hickey	9 (1873)	Hunt	none	none	Ct. Cl.	affirmed
Marin v. Lalley	14 (1873)	Chase	none	none	C.C.D. La.	dismissal denied
Bank of the Metropolis v. Kennedy	19 (1873)	Bradley	none	none	Sup. Ct. D.C.	affirmed
The Nuestra Senora	29 (1873)	Chase	none	none	S.D.N.Y.	reversed
Branson v. Wirth	32 (1873)	Bradley	none	none	C.C.S.D. Ill.	reversed
Olcott v. Bynum	44 (1873)	Swayne	none	none	C.C.D.N.C.	affirmed
Ex parte Warmouth	64 (1873)	Chase	none	none	C.C.D. La.	dismissed
Mason v. United States	67 (1873)	Clifford	none	Chase	Ct. Cl.	affirmed
Sweeny v. United States	75 (1873)	Clifford	none	none	Ct. Cl.	affirmed
Harwood v. Air-Line R.R. Co.	78 (1873)	Hunt	none	none	D. Ind.	affirmed
Averill v. Smith	82 (1873)	Clifford	none	none	C.C.N.D.N.Y.	reversed
Bailey v. Hannibal et al. R.R. Co.	96 (1873)	Clifford	none	none	C.C.D. Mo.	affirmed
Oulton v. German S. & L. Soc'y	109 (1873)	Clifford	none	none	C.C.D. Cal.	reversed
Goddard v. Foster	123 (1873)	Clifford	none	none	C.C.D.N.Y.	affirmed
Williams v. Baker	144 (1873)	Miller	none	none	C.C.D. Iowa	affirmed
Homestead Co. v. Des Moines V.R.R. Co.	153 (1873)	Davis	none	none	C.C.D. Iowa	affirmed
Crilley v. Burrows	167 (1873)	Davis	none	none	not indicated	not indicated
United States v. Cook	168 (1873)	Clifford	none	none	C.C.S.D. Ohio	certification
Collector v. Beggs	182 (1873)	Strong	none	none	C.C.S.D.N.Y.	reversed
Lapeyre v. United States	191 (1873)	Swayne	none	Hunt	Ct. Cl.	reversed
Allen v. United States	207 (1873)	Field	none	none	Ct. Cl.	affirmed
Holden v. Joy	211 (1873)	Clifford	none	none	C.C.D. Kan.	affirmed
Warner v. Joy	253 (1873)	Clifford	none	none	C.C.D. Kan.	affirmed
Tyler v. Magwire	253 (1873)	Clifford	none	none	Mo.	reversed
Barnes v. Philadelphia & Reading R.R.	294 (1873)	Clifford	Bradley	Strong	C.C.E.D. Pa.	reversed
United States v. Baltimore & O.R.R. Co.	322 (1873)	Hunt	Bradley	Clifford	C.C.D. Md.	affirmed
Hume v. Beale's Ex'r	336 (1873)	Davis	none	none	Sup. Ct. D.C.	affirmed
Allen v. Massey	351 (1873)	Field	none	none	C.C.D. Mo.	affirmed
Rodd v. Heartt	354 (1873)	Chase	none	none	C.C.D. La.	dismissal denied
New York C.R.R. Co. v. Lockwood	357 (1873)	Bradley	none	none	C.C.S.D.N.Y.	affirmed
Stitt v. Huidekopers	384 (1873)	Miller	none	none	C.C.W.D. Pa.	affirmed
Conway v. Stannard	398 (1873)	Davis	none	none	C.C.D. Vt.	certification
United States v. Henry	405 (1873)	Miller	none	none	Ct. Cl.	affirmed
Reed v. Gardner	409 (1873)	Hunt	none	none	C.C.S.D. Ga.	affirmed
Ray v. Smith	411 (1873)	Strong	none	none	M.D. Ala.	reversed
Moore v. Huntington	417 (1873)	Miller	none	none	Sup. Ct. Terr. N.M.	reversed
State v. Stoll	425 (1873)	Hunt	none	Bradley	S.C.	reversed
Lasere v. Rochereau	437 (1873)	Swayne	none	none	La.	reversed
Ex parte Atocha	439 (1873)	Field	none	none	Ct. Cl.	mandamus denied
Washington et al. R.R. Co. v. Brown	445 (1873)	Davis	none	none	Sup. Ct. D.C.	affirmed
Adams v. Burke	453 (1873)	Miller	none	Bradley	C.C.D. Mass.	affirmed
Philp v. Nock	460 (1873)	Swayne	none	none	Sup. Ct. D.C.	reversed
Carlton v. Bokee	463 (1873)	Bradley	none	none	C.C.D. Md.	affirmed
Wilson v. City Bank	473 (1873)	Miller	none	none	C.C.D. Minn.	certification
Carpenter v. United States	489 (1873)	Strong	none	none	Ct. Cl.	affirmed
United States v. Isham	496 (1873)	Hunt	none	none	C.C.E.D. Mich.	dismissed
Northwestern P. Co. v. McCue	508 (1873)	Davis	none	none	C.C.E.D. Wis.	affirmed
Goodwin v. United States	515 (1873)	Swayne	none	none	Ct. Cl.	affirmed
Cutner v. United States	517 (1873)	Bradley	none	none	Ct. Cl.	affirmed
Board of P. Works v. Columbia Coll.	521 (1873)	Field	none	none	Sup. Ct. D.C.	affirmed
Rea v. Missouri	532 (1873)	Bradley	none	none	C.C.D. Mo.	reversed
Eldred v. Michigan Ins. Bank	545 (1873)	Miller	none	none	C.C.E.D. Wis.	reversed
Union P.R.R. Co. v. Fort	553 (1873)	Davis	none	none	C.C.D. Neb.	affirmed
Chicago & N.R.R. Co. v. Fuller	560 (1873)	Swayne	none	none	C.C.D. Iowa	affirmed
Horn v. Lockhart	570 (1873)	Field	none	none	C.C.S.D. Ala.	affirmed
The Merritt	582 (1873)	Hunt	none	none	C.C.E.D. Wis.	affirmed
Knode v. Williamson	586 (1873)	Strong	none	none	D.W. Va.	reversed
Harrell v. Beall's Assignee	590 (1873)	Miller	none	none	C.C.S.D. Ga.	affirmed
Amoskeag Mfg. Co. v. United States	592 (1873)	Miller	none	none	Ct. Cl.	reversed
Sohn v. Waterson	596 (1873)	Bradley	none	none	C.C.D. Kan.	affirmed
United States v. Lapène	601 (1873)	Hunt	none	none	Ct. Cl.	reversed
United States v. Boutwell	604 (1873)	Strong	none	none	Sup. Ct. D.C.	mandamus denied
Sawyer v. Hoag's Assignee	610 (1873)	Miller	none	none	C.C.N.D. Ill.	affirmed
Kibbe v. Benson	624 (1873)	Hunt	none	none	C.C.S.D. Ill.	affirmed
Smiths v. Shoemaker	630 (1873)	Miller	none	none	Sup. Ct. D.C.	reversed
Daniel v. Whartenby	639 (1873)	Swayne	none	none	C.C.D. Del.	affirmed
Walker v. State H. Comm'rs	648 (1873)	Field	none	none	C.C.D. Cal.	affirmed
The Star of Hope	651 (1873)	Bradley	none	none	C.C.D. Cal.	affirmed
Miller v. Joseph	655 (1873)	Field	none	none	Va.	dismissed
Sioux City & P.R.R. Co. v. Stout	657 (1873)	Hunt	none	none	C.C.D. Neb.	affirmed
The Emily Souder	666 (1873)	Field	none	none	C.C.S.D.N.Y.	affirmed
Manhattan L. Ins. Co. v. Francisco	672 (1873)	Strong	none	none	C.C.D. Cal.	affirmed
