= Blair Community Schools =

School district in Blair, Nebraska (USA)

Blair Community Schools is a school district headquartered in Blair, Nebraska.

== Schools ==
- Blair High School
- Otte Blair Middle School
- Arbor Park Intermediate School

Elementary schools:

- Deerfield Primary School
- North Primary School
- South Primary School
