= Blair Bridge (U.S. Route 30) =

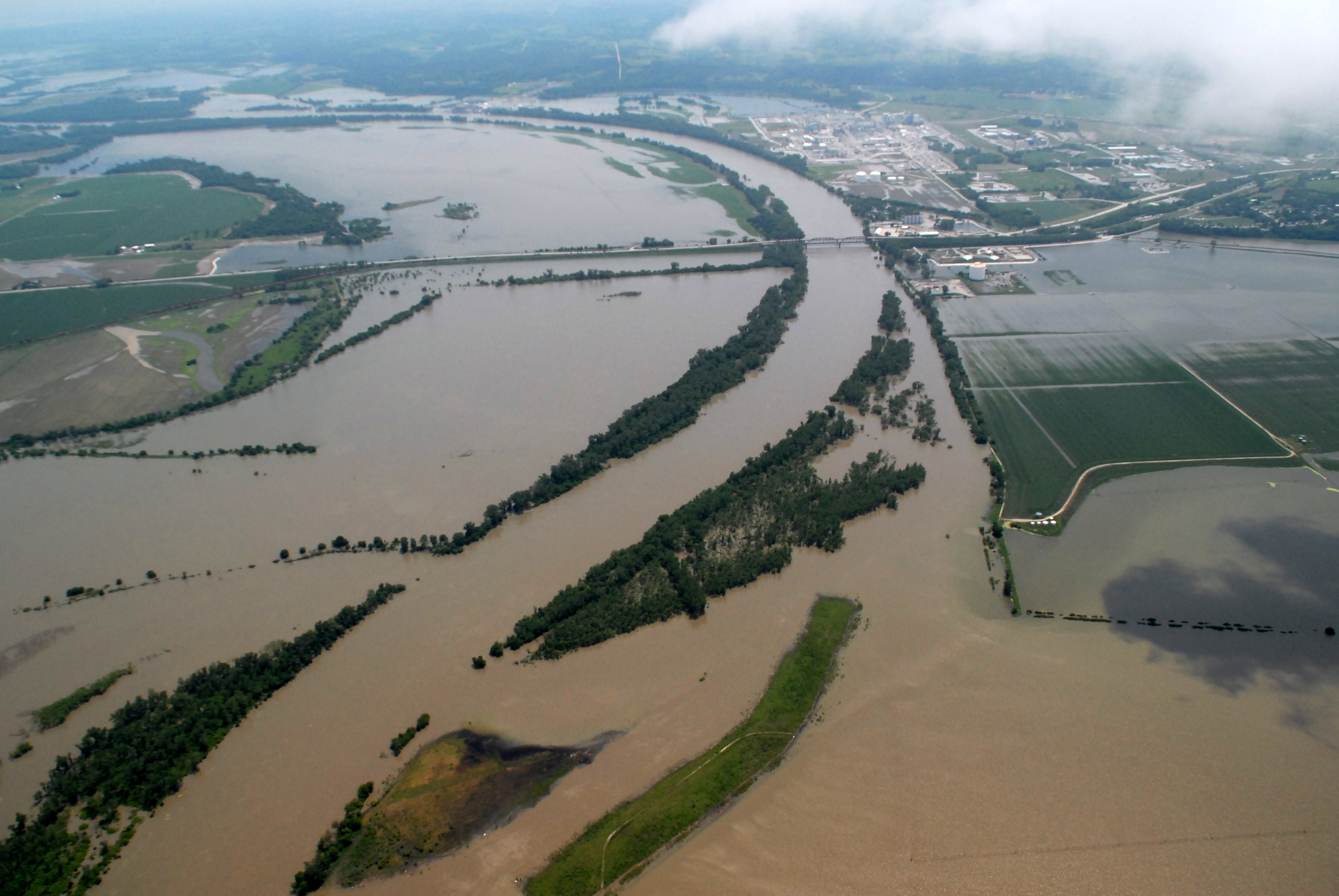
- Blair Bridge on June 20, 2011 during the 2011 Missouri River floods. Authorities attempted to keep the bridge open since it was the only crossing that could be crossed between Sioux City and Omaha.
- Coordinates: 41°33′04″N 96°05′44″W
- Carries: US 30
- Crosses: Missouri River
- Locale: Blair, Nebraska, and Harrison County, Iowa, USA

The Blair Bridge or Abraham Lincoln Memorial Bridge carries U.S. Route 30 between the U.S. states of Nebraska and Iowa, across the Missouri River near Blair, Nebraska. Rail traffic crosses via the parallel Blair Bridge (Union Pacific Railroad).

== History ==
The first Blair Bridge opened to traffic in 1929. It was designed by Harrington, Howard, and Ash and Sverdrup & Parcel and constructed by Kansas City Bridge Company, Wisconsin Bridge & Iron Company, and Woods Brothers Construction Company. Originally a toll bridge, the tolls were removed in 1962.

In 1991, a new structure replaced the original truss bridge.

== See also ==
- The Lincoln Highway formerly ran through Blair and over this bridge
- List of bridges documented by the Historic American Engineering Record in Iowa
- List of bridges documented by the Historic American Engineering Record in Nebraska
