= AJX Bridge over South Fork and Powder River =

- U.S. National Register of Historic Places
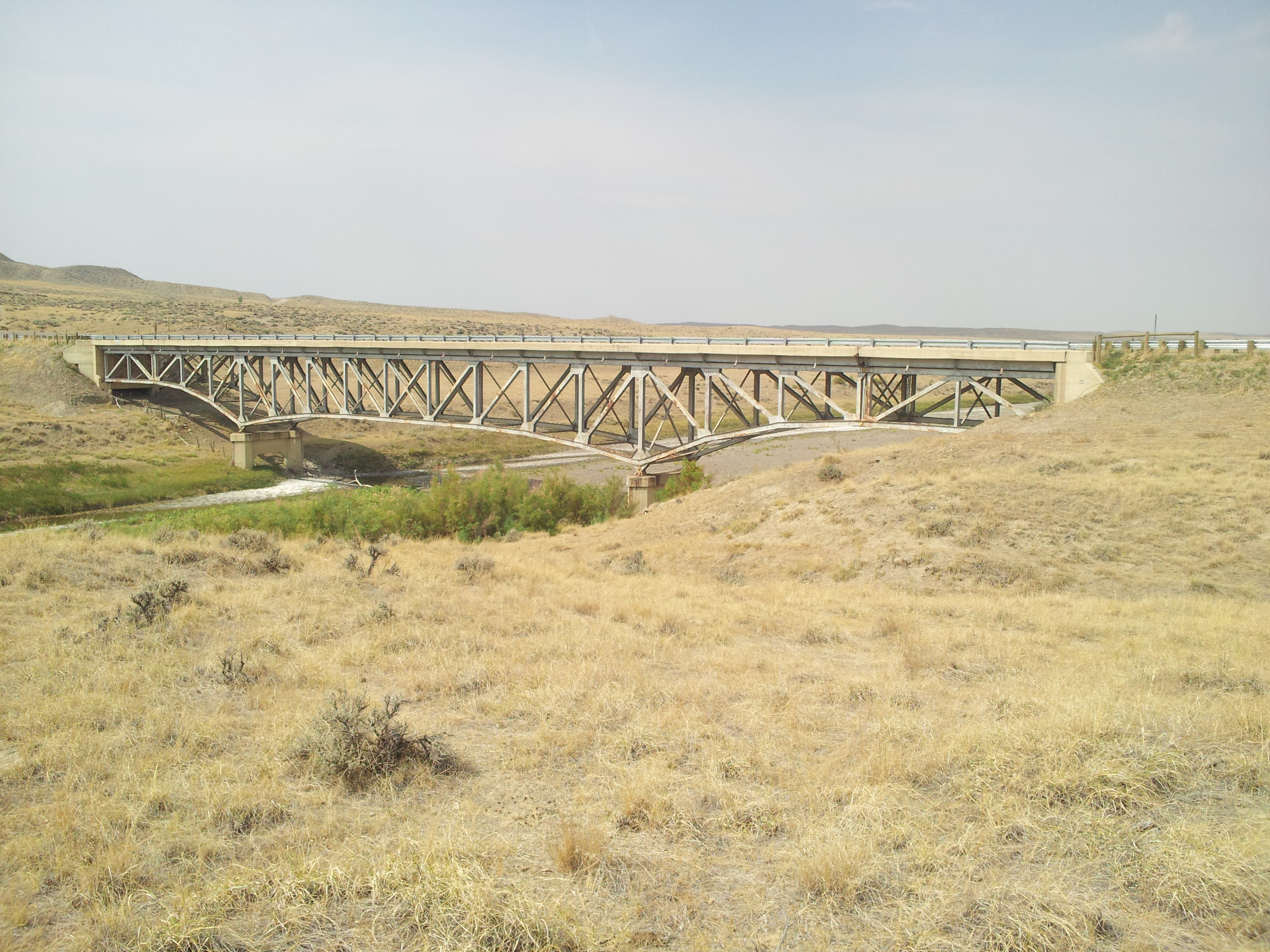
- AJX Bridge

- Location within Wyoming Location within the United States
- Nearest city: Kaycee, Wyoming
- Coordinates: 43°37′13″N 106°34′37″W
- Area: less than one acre
- Built: 1931–32
- Built by: Omaha Steel Works
- Architectural style: Pratt deck truss
- MPS: Vehicular Truss and Arch Bridges in Wyoming TR
- NRHP reference No.: 85000426
- Added to NRHP: February 22, 1985

The AJX Bridge is a historic Pratt truss bridge in southwestern Johnson County, Wyoming. The bridge was built in 1931 across the South Fork of the Powder River near Kaycee, Wyoming. AJX Bridge was built to provide a river crossing for U.S. Route 87. It was placed on the National Register of Historic Places in 1985 as part of a Multiple Property Submission devoted to historic bridges in Wyoming.

== Design ==
The Pratt truss bridge was invented in 1844 by Thomas and Caleb Pratt. A Pratt truss has vertical members and diagonals that slope down towards the center. The interior diagonals are under tension, and the vertical elements are under compression. Pratt truss bridges were the preferred design for medium-span vehicular bridges during the late nineteenth and early twentieth centuries. A truss bridge can carry the roadbed on top, in the middle, or underneath the truss. Bridges with the roadbed at the top or the bottom are the most common as this allows both the top and bottom to be stiffened, forming a box truss. When the roadbed is atop the truss it is called a deck truss. The AJX Bridge is a deck truss bridge, since the roadway is on top of the truss.

A cantilever bridge is a bridge built using cantilevers, structures that project horizontally into space, supported on only one end. The steel truss cantilever bridge was a major engineering breakthrough since it can span distances of over 1,500 feet (460 m). The AJX bridge is the only surviving cantilevered deck truss bridge in Wyoming.

== Construction ==
The AJX Bridge was built in 1931–32 by the Omaha Steel Works of Omaha, Nebraska, under a contract with the Wyoming Highway Department. The steel deck truss is 306 feet (93 m) long, with three spans. There are pin connections between the two approach spans and the cantilever span. The piers are a solid shaft concrete, and the roadway width is 20 feet (6.1 m).

Originally located on U.S. Route 87 (US 87), today the road has been renumbered as Interstate 25 service road. The bridge is located several miles south of Interstate 25 exit 249, and it is about 7 miles (11 km) south of Kaycee, Wyoming. The future of the bridge is controlled by an agreement between the Federal Highway Administration, and several Wyoming state agencies. The AJX Bridge is rated as "structurally deficient" by the Federal Highway Administration.

== Photo gallery ==
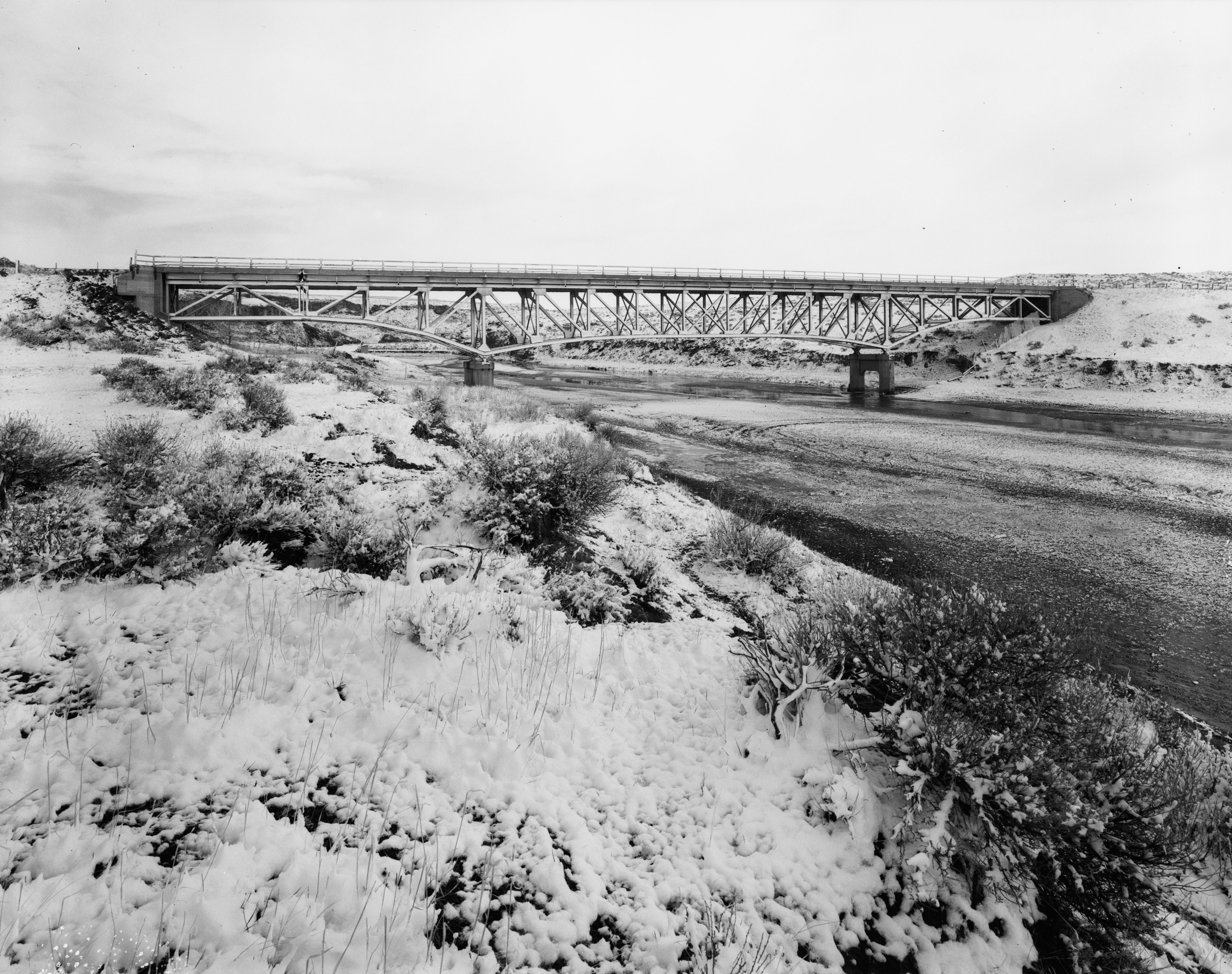
HAER photo of AJX Bridge

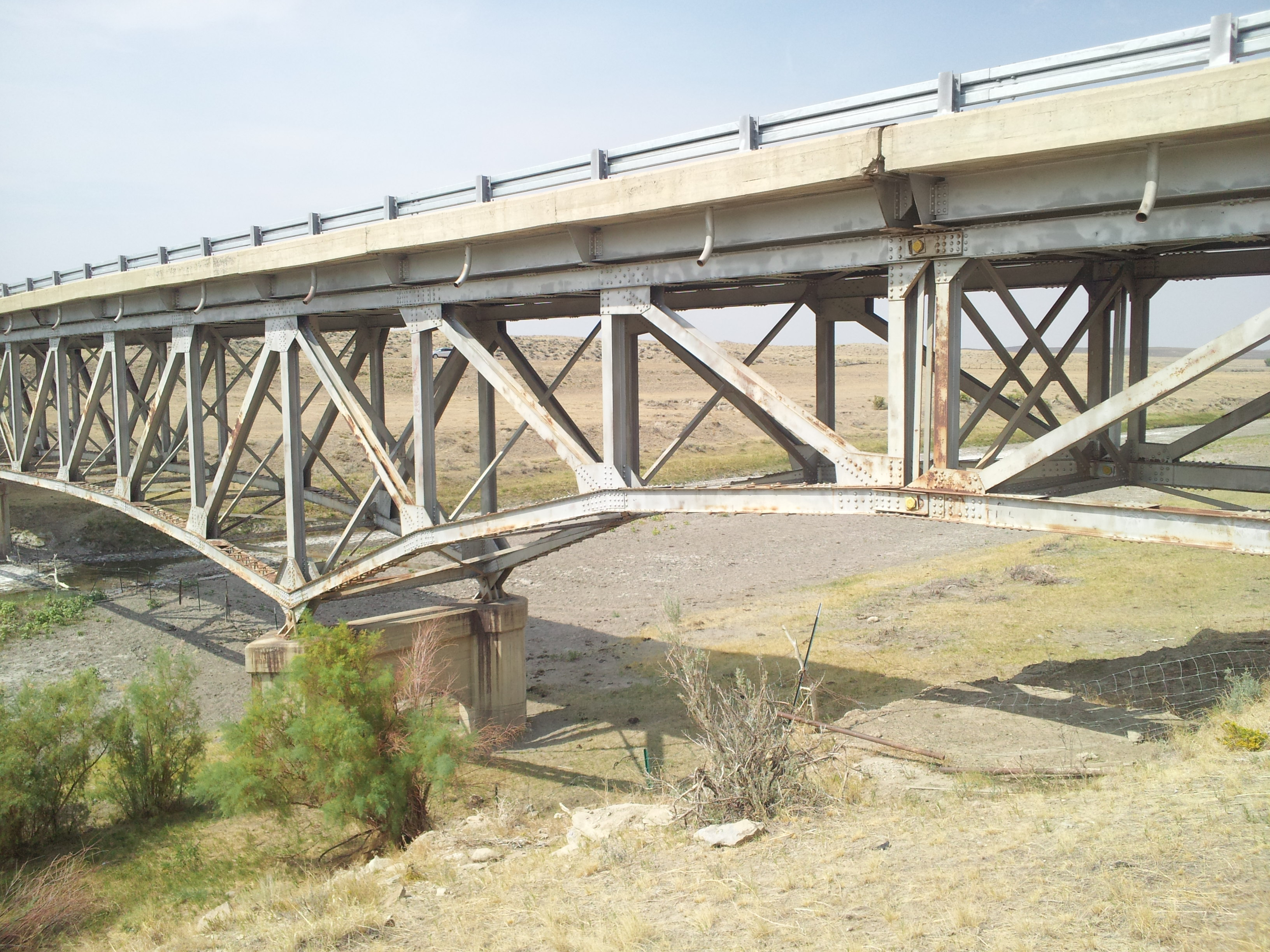
Detail view of AJX Bridge trusses

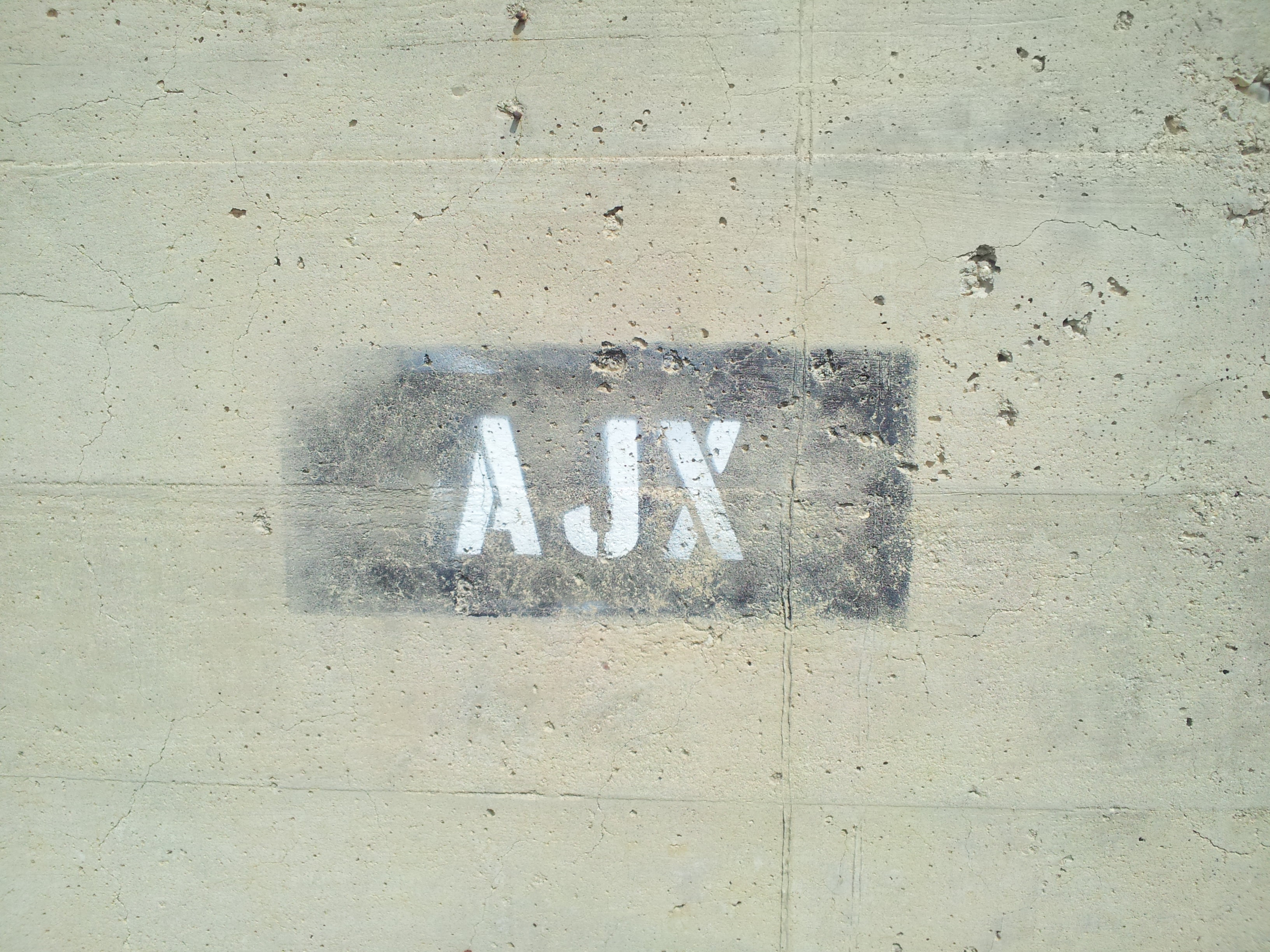
AJX Bridge marker on southern pier

== See also ==
- List of bridges documented by the Historic American Engineering Record in Wyoming
- List of bridges on the National Register of Historic Places in Wyoming
- National Register of Historic Places listings in Johnson County, Wyoming
