= Mike Hollingshead =

Mike Hollingshead is an American professional storm chaser, photographer and videographer from Blair, Nebraska. His work has appeared on the cover of National Geographic. It was also featured in the films Take Shelter, The Fifth Estate and the series finale of Dexter. In 2008, Hollingshead released his first book titled Adventures in Tornado Alley: The Storm Chasers with co-author Eric Nguyen.

Some of his photographs have been circulated by e-mail without his permission and without giving him credit or payment, in some cases misidentified as being of Hurricane Katrina. He now adds a digital watermark to his photographs to discourage this.
