= Kent Bellows =

American artist (1949–2005)

- Born: June 26, 1949; Blair, Nebraska
- Died: September 14, 2005 (aged 56)

Kent Bellows (June 26, 1949 – September 14, 2005) was an artist best known for his figurative works in the realist style. His artwork is sometimes referred to as meticulous realism, a subcategory referring to the artist's attention to detail.

== The 1950s ==
Kent Bellows was born on June 26, 1949, in Blair, Nebraska. As a young boy, Bellows attended Saturday film matinees at the Home Theater and became enamored with cinema, an interest that continued throughout his life and was influential to his art. He was known in the small community as “that kid who can draw”.

== The 1960s ==
Bellows’ father was a commercial artist and watercolorist. He recognized his son's natural inclination towards art and taught him what he knew from his own training and experience. In later years, Bellows referred to his father as his “best critic” and “a great influence.” In 1965, Bellows, his parents, and his two younger sisters moved to Omaha, Nebraska, where he attended high school. He earned money selling artwork and playing keyboards with rock-and-roll bands. His main four year band experience was with the “Blue Ruins” from Omaha, NE. Band members included Paul Knight, Robert Knight, Greg DeMarco and Mark Mayhan.

Following high school, Bellows studied art history at the local university for two years and experimented with various artistic styles and mediums. During this time, he continued to play keyboards with bands, including performers Sonny and Cher during a Midwest tour.

== The 1970s ==
Making a decision to focus solely on developing his artistic talent, Bellows sought out patrons in the tradition of the old masters for financial support. These included Omaha native Warren Buffett. Mr. Buffett referred Bellows to his wife, Susie, a lover of the arts. Mrs. Buffett agreed to provide support for one year in exchange for artwork. Out of this relationship developed a lifelong friendship. In 1970, Bellows resided briefly in Connecticut and then moved to Berkeley, California, but soon settled back in Omaha, where he lived for the remainder of his life.

Bellows’ early works were included in Joslyn Art Museum’s 1970 Midwest Biennial Show as well as other exhibitions around Omaha. His early works included abstracts and figurative pieces, some with a Native American theme. Acrylic was his primary medium during this period.

In 1971, Bellows took his first trip to Europe to study the art of the great masters throughout Italy and France.

In 1972, his work was halted due to pain caused by a ganglion cyst that was wound around the tendons of his left wrist. This was crippling for Bellows, who was left-handed. He was referred to the Mayo Clinic, where the cyst was removed in a long and complicated surgery. Bellows soaked his wrist in a therapeutic hot wax bath daily for the rest of his life to treat his lingering wrist pain.

After renting a house with a friend and then living in a patron’s carriage house for a year, Bellows moved into a midtown Omaha apartment, where he lived and worked for the remainder of the decade. He lived there with Elizabeth Irvin, to whom he was married in 1976. Bellows earned a portion of his living during this period through illustration work for publications such as Omni and Rolling Stone, often with a science fiction theme. One such illustration, which appeared in Rolling Stone in 1975, featured science fiction writer Philip K. Dick, who later wrote in a letter to Bellows, “You gave me a reflected self or identity and I suddenly believed I was real…From the moment I saw your picture, I was changed back to my old, real self…you cured me of my identity-less sickness. This is heavy stuff, but true.”

"I see in my mind this mysterious, ethereal museum filled with paintings I haven’t done. That’s what makes the whole trip worthwhile"

— Kent Bellows

== The 1980's ==
Bellows and his wife divorced in 1979. A year later, Bellows met and married Angela Shomaker. Bellows, Angela, and her three children from a former marriage moved into an older home in midtown Omaha where Bellows set up a studio in the basement. He supported his new family through commissioned portraiture throughout the early 1980s. This period led the artist to a more serious focus on the human figure, and a greater interest in the medium of graphite.

In 1985, Bellows learned that New York gallery owner Peter Tatistcheff was coming to the region, and Bellows asked a Blair man who owned several of Bellows’ works to invite the gallery owner to join him for dinner as a way for Bellows to meet him and share his portfolio. Two weeks later, Bellows had signed with the Tatistcheff Gallery. This event marked the start of a prolific period of two decades during which Bellows produced primarily figurative artwork using graphite, charcoal, pastel, egg tempera, acrylic, and oil.

Commenting on his meticulous approach, Bellows stated in 1986, “The image I create on the canvas is the difference between the reality of a photograph and what is actually happening. This makes for a finely tuned picture, enabling me to capture the subject’s soul.” Bellows was reluctant to talk about the meaning of specific works. In 1988, he said, “I try to depict the inner life of the subject, to give outward form to an inner state. I think my pictures have stories behind them, but I like to leave a feeling of openness. I hope that things keep going in the viewer’s mind. There’s nothing more boring than a story too quickly told. Once all the elements of a story are nailed down, the viewer is left with nothing but the artist’s technique.”

During the 1980s, Bellows’ works were included in exhibits at:

- Tatistcheff Gallery, New York City
- Museum of the Surreal and Fantastique, New York City
- Arkansas Arts Center, Little Rock, Arkansas
- Huntsville Museum of Art, Huntsville, Alabama
- Hirschl and Adler, New York City
- Harris, Samuel, and Company Gallery, Coconut Grove, Florida
- National Academy of Design, New York City
- Smith College Museum of Art, Northampton, Massachusetts
- Butler Institute of American Art, Youngstown, Ohio
- Sheldon Art Museum, Lincoln, Nebraska
- Nelson-Atkins Museum of Art, Kansas City, Missouri
- New Britain Museum of American Art, New Britain, Connecticut
- Squibb Gallery, Princeton, New Jersey
- Toledo Museum of Art, Toledo, Ohio

In 1989, Bellows purchased a large building in midtown Omaha that he christened the Mahler Building, after the composer Gustav Mahler. Once home to the Mermaid Lounge, Bellows renovated the building and used it as his studio, with space to build large sets to use as backdrops to his artwork. Regarding the design and creation of actual sets as backdrops to his work, he remarked, “It’s a real little bit of Hollywood, the way I work.” In 1992, Bellows also described his art as “little movies that don’t move… I try to make art that is really part of me, that there is just no question about it. I get that from a Bergman film. I get that from Scorsese. I get that from David Lynch.”

== The 1990s ==
Bellows and his second wife divorced in 1991. This had an impact on Bellows and on his art, which became darker and more intense, often including religious themes. Bellows talked about the relationship between his art and his personal life in a 1992 Nebraska Educational Television documentary, “What is Art?” “Talk about saving the world. It does save my world. It’s the way I just kind of claw and finds my way through the darkness. I mean that’s it. I can’t imagine a life without making art. Joseph Campbell, in one of his lectures, said something that struck me—that artists are generally people who have come apart at the seams somewhere along the line, and their work is an attempt to put themselves back together again, or at least keep themselves together. That’s definitely what my work is about.”

Later, Bellows added, “These projects work for me. It’s clarified my thinking. The thing about an experience like divorce for me is it’s just the way that the meaning drains out of your life. This has been my way to try to put it back, just to make sense of the experience. And it’s working, it’s working. I feel a lot calmer about it. I think that’s one thing about our culture. Just a part of our culture where any bad thing, just push it down, avoid it… don’t feel it… I’m trying to actually just feel it… because that’s the thing about emotions, they have a purpose. I mean, I’m no psychologist, but for myself, to actually experience it in a complete way and survive it. They don’t go away, but you process that material and then you go on to the next thing. I think that’s what I’m doing.”

Shortly after his divorce, Bellows traveled to Europe for the second time, this time primarily studying artwork in Florence, Italy. Bellows often looked to the old masters for his inspiration. In 1992, he stated, “I feel like my real teachers were the older painters. They were the ones. I would go to Joslyn, and feel like I learned how to apply paint from what I saw down there.” He once said that he frequently did self-portraits because it is the tradition of artists, especially those he admired most—the artists of the fifteenth and sixteenth centuries. Bellows also spoke of the influence of nineteenth-century American painter, Thomas Eakins, on his work, and referred to him as his “great American hero.” He described Gregory Gillespie, a contemporary figurative artist, as another great inspiration.

In 1993, Bellows left Tatistcheff Gallery to join Forum Gallery in New York City.

Following his 1991 divorce, Bellows had continued to reside in his midtown Omaha home along with his two teenage stepdaughters, but by 1994, they had moved out, and he sold the house to a long-time friend. Bellows moved into his nearby studio building, where he lived and worked for the remainder of his life.

During the 1990s, Bellows’ works were included in exhibits at:

- Tatistcheff Gallery, New York City
- Museum of Nebraska Art, Kearney, Nebraska
- Arkansas Arts Center, Little Rock, Arkansas
- North Miami Center of Contemporary Art, Miami, Florida
- Midtown Payson Gallery, New York City
- Chicago International Art Exposition, Navy Pier, Chicago, Illinois
- Philbrook Museum of Art, Tulsa, Oklahoma
- Forum Gallery, New York City
- Art Dealers' Association of America, Seventh Regiment Armory, New York City
- Art Institute of Chicago, Chicago, Illinois.

== 2000-2005 ==
By 2003, Bellows had begun expressing concern about increasing pain and diminished flexibility in his left wrist and hand, apparently related to the earlier surgery, overuse, and an additional developing condition known as Dupuytren's contracture, common in his mother's family. Bellows’ ability to work was increasingly impacted.

Between 2000 and 2005, Bellows’ works were included in exhibits at:

- Art Dealers’ Association of America, Seventh Regiment Armory, New York City
- Joslyn Art Museum, Omaha, Nebraska
- Forum Gallery, New York City
- Museum of Nebraska Art, Kearney, Nebraska
- New Jersey Center for Visual Arts, Summit, New Jersey
- Chicago International Art Exhibition, Navy Pier, Chicago, Illinois
- Neuberger Museum of Art, Purchase, New York.

His works were featured in The Gettysburg Review, Spring, 2004.

Bellows’ works have been acquired by museums and galleries which include the Metropolitan Museum of Art, the New Britain Museum of American Art, the Toledo Museum of Art, the Arkansas Arts Center, Joslyn Art Museum, and by many collectors including Glenn C. Jans, Jalane and Richard Davidson, Rita Rich, Richard D. Segal (Seavest Collection), and Howard Tullman.

In September 2005, Kent Bellows was found in his studio/home, apparently having died in his sleep. He was 56 years of age. The cause of death was never determined.

== 2007 ==
The Kent Bellows Foundation was established as a public, nonprofit charity and began the work of preserving Kent Bellows’ building and studio as an educational site and establishing the Kent Bellows Art Scholarship Fund and Kent Bellows Mentoring Program, as well as developing Bellows’ lifetime catalog raisonne.
