= Mick Mines =

American politician

Mick Mines (born 1950) was a Nebraska (United States) state senator from Blair, Nebraska in the Nebraska Legislature from 2003 until his resignation in 2007. He is currently a lobbyist.

== Personal life ==
He was born on June 21, 1950, in Fremont, Nebraska and graduated from North Bend Central High School and Elkins Institute in Dallas, Texas. He was in the U.S. Naval Reserve Corp and held position of city council president and mayor of the City of Blair, NE. He has won Nebraska Diplomat of the Year Award, Cargill Dow Friend of Industry Award, League of Nebraska Municipalities' Servant Leadership Award, Gateway Development Corp's Emmet Award and the Metropolitan Area Planning Association Citizenship Award.

== State legislature ==
Mines was elected in 2002 and reelected in 2006 to represent Nebraska's 18th Legislative District. After being re-elected to a second term in 2006, Mines served as the vice chair of the Government, Military and Veterans Affairs Committee and as a member of the Transportation and Telecommunications Committee. He was chair of the Banking, Commerce and Insurance Committee (2004/05)and served on the Judiciary Committee (2003/04). In September 2007, Mines announced his resignation from the seat, effective at the end of October 2007. Following his resignation, he accepted a position with a public relations and lobbying firm.

Political offices
Preceded by Doug Cunningham	Nebraska state senator - District 18; 2003-2007	Succeeded by Scott Lautenbaugh

== See also ==
- Nebraska Legislature
