= Siouxland Veterans Memorial Bridge =

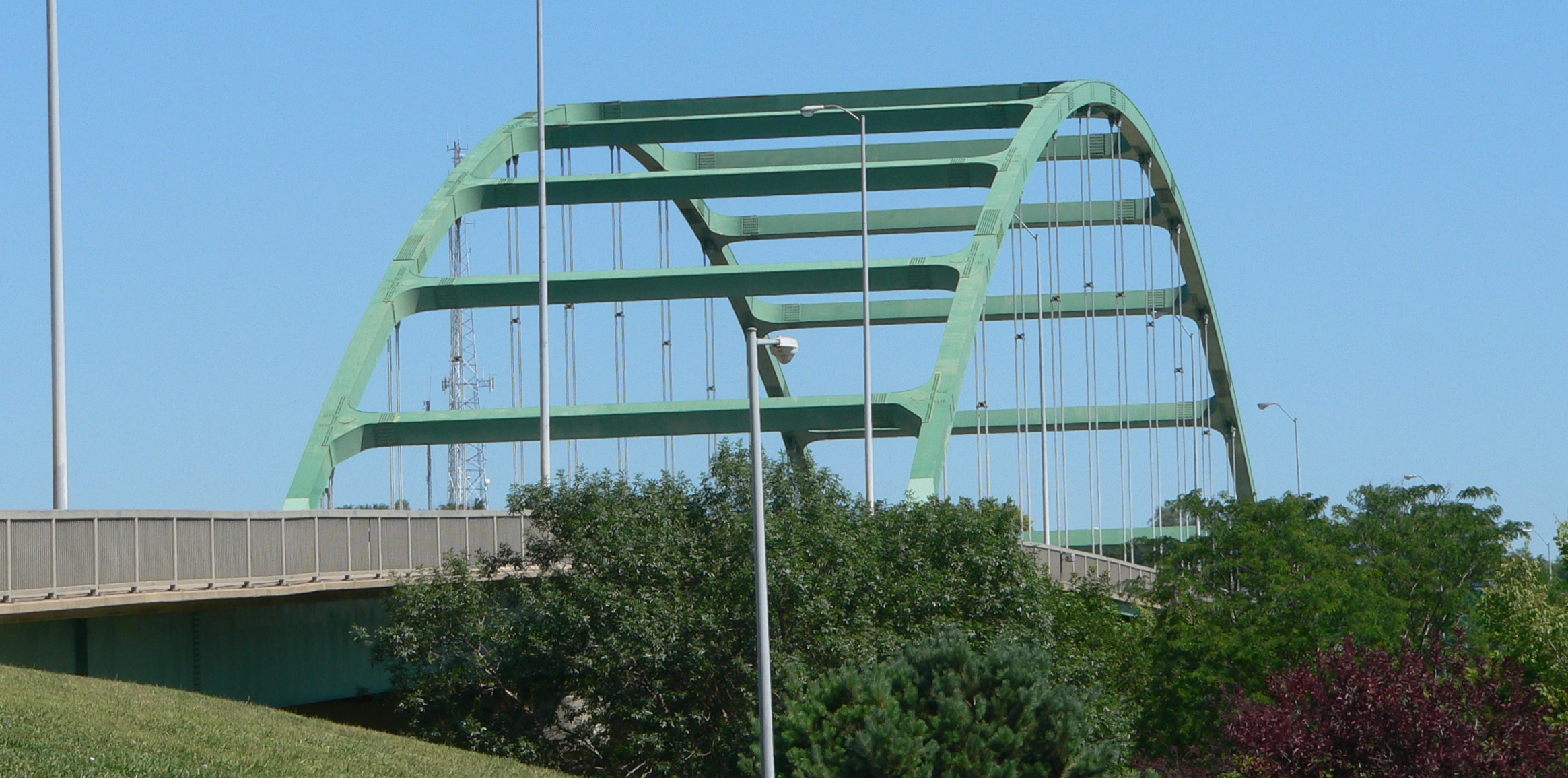
- Siouxland Veterans Bridge, seen from the Nebraska side
- Coordinates: 42°29′15″N 96°24′49″W
- Carries: US 77
- Crosses: Missouri River
- Locale: Sioux City, Iowa, and South Sioux City, Nebraska

Characteristics
- Design: Through arch bridge
- Total length: 1,502.4 feet (457.9 m)
- Width: 63.0 feet (19.2 m)
- Longest span: 425.2 feet (129.6 m)
- Clearance above: 17.1 feet (5.2 m)

History
- Opened: 1981

Statistics
- Daily traffic: 28,600

The Siouxland Veterans Memorial Bridge is a through arch bridge which carries U.S. Route 77 across the Missouri River between Sioux City, Iowa, and South Sioux City, Nebraska.

The bridge replaced the Combination Bridge, so called because it carried both rail and highway traffic, built in 1896. The previous bridge was documented by the Historic American Engineering Record in 1980, prior to its replacement.

The current bridge was dedicated in July 1981, and the previous one was demolished. However, in May 1982 a 32-inch (810 mm) crack was discovered in the downstream tie girder. The bridge was hurriedly closed, and measures taken to ensure that it would not collapse into the river, affecting barge traffic. Initially, it was estimated that repairs would take six days; in fact, the bridge was completely closed for seven months, and did not fully re-open to traffic until May 1983.

== See also ==
- List of bridges documented by the Historic American Engineering Record in Iowa
- List of bridges documented by the Historic American Engineering Record in Nebraska
- List of crossings of the Missouri River
