= Union Pacific Missouri River Bridge =

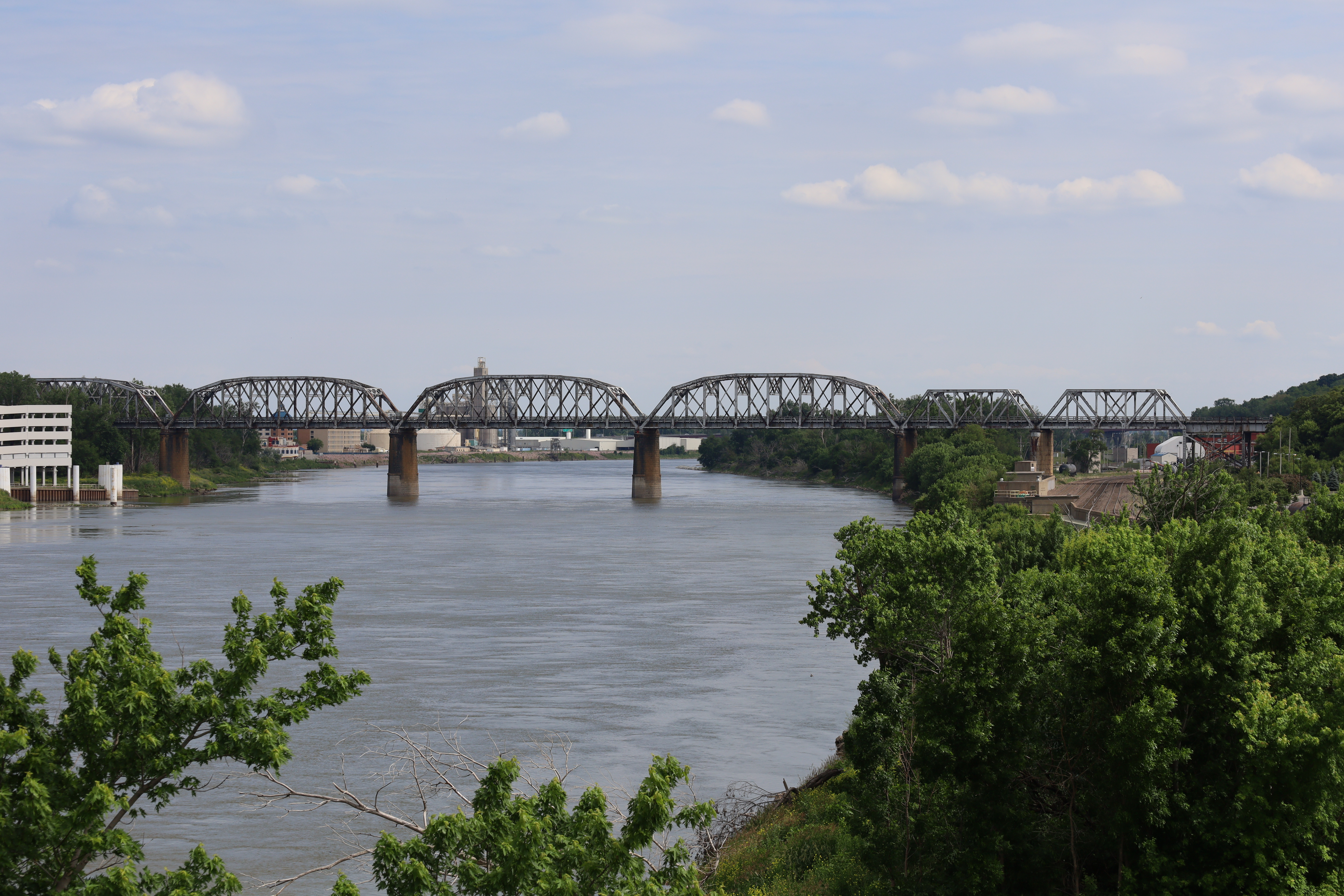
- The bridge in 2025
- Coordinates: 41°14′59″N 95°55′02″W
- Carries: Railroad
- Crosses: Missouri River
- Locale: Council Bluffs, Iowa, and Omaha, Nebraska
- Owner: Union Pacific

History
- Construction start: May 1916
- Opened: December 20, 1916

Location
- Interactive map of Union Pacific Missouri River Bridge

The Union Pacific Missouri River Bridge is a rail truss bridge across the Missouri River between Council Bluffs, Iowa, and Omaha, Nebraska.

== History ==
When the first railroad bridge on the site opened on March 27, 1872, it connected the First transcontinental railroad to the eastern United States. The bridge was rebuilt twice, with the current bridge opening on December 20, 1916.

=== First bridge ===
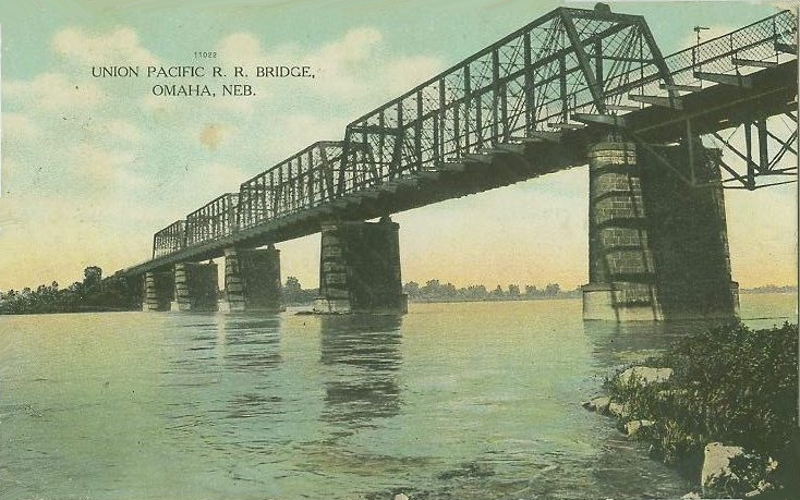
The original Union Pacific Bridge around 1909

When the Union Pacific began heading west from Omaha in 1862 there were no railroads connecting to it from the east. After the Chicago and North Western Railway reached Council Bluffs in 1867, the Union Pacific for a while tried to run freight trains across the frozen river during the winter. The Union Pacific Transfer company maintained a ferry service from 1866 to 1872.

In 1869 the transcontinental railroad was completed. An 1871 report to stockholders has this description:

The want of a bridge over the Missouri River, at Omaha to connect the eastern railroads with the Union Pacific, has been one of the most annoying incidents connected with the trip to California ... The bridge is of 11 spans, 250 feet each, 50 feet above high water, resting upon one store abutment now complete; and 11 iron piers, all in place and the larger part already sunk from 60 to 72 feet in the sand, and resting in the bed-rock.

During the 3 years of construction, around 500 men were constantly employed during the construction of the bridge. To place the piers, iron columns were sunk into the water and air pressure was used to displace the water in the column at which point, men entered the column and dug out the sand underneath allow the column to sink until it reached bedrock. Using this process, they were able to sink the columns as much as 17 feet (5.2 m) per day. The deepest the men worked was 82 feet (25 m) below the surface of the water during which time they were exposed to air pressure that was 54 pounds per square inch (psi) greater than atmospheric pressure (14.6 psi). The columns were then filled with rock and concrete to form a base for the masonry piers above the water line.

The new single-track railway bridge was completed in 1872 at a cost of $1.75 million ($47 million in present day terms). In 1877, a tornado weakened the two easternmost spans, requiring them to be replaced with a wooden trestle.

=== Second bridge ===
In 1885, to keep pace with the growing demand for railway transportation, construction began on a new bridge. Designed and built under the direction of George S. Morison, it opened in the fall of 1887. It was 1,750 feet (530 m) long, with four Whipple trusses on stone masonry piers and three deck spans at each end. It was the first double-track railway bridge across the Missouri River.

The 1887 bridge also became obsolete. The peak year for American railroad track mileage was 1916. Nearly all interstate commerce went by rail. Six trunk lines of railroad used this bridge, with an average 320 freight and passenger trains crossing every 24 hours.

=== Current bridge ===
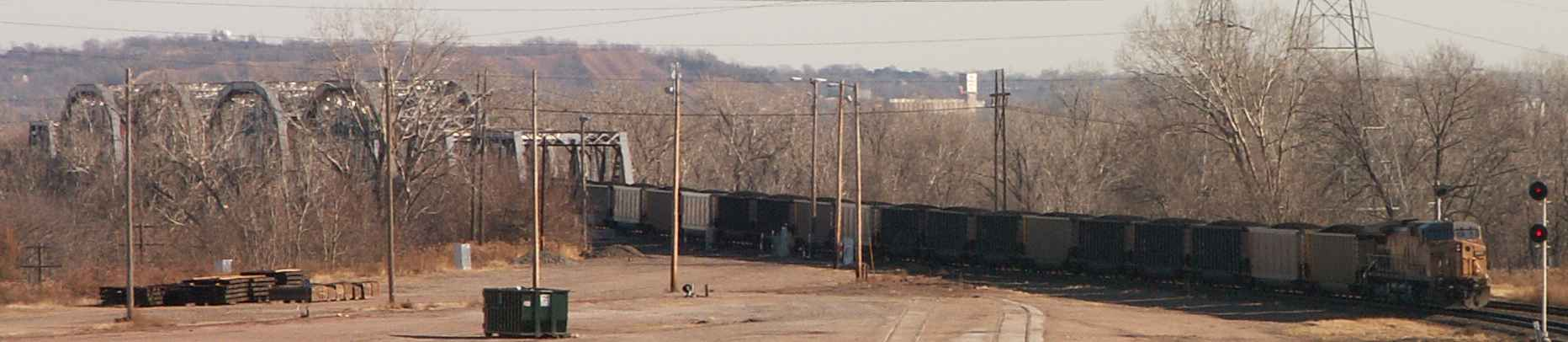
Union Pacific coal train crossing bridge with Loess Hills in background

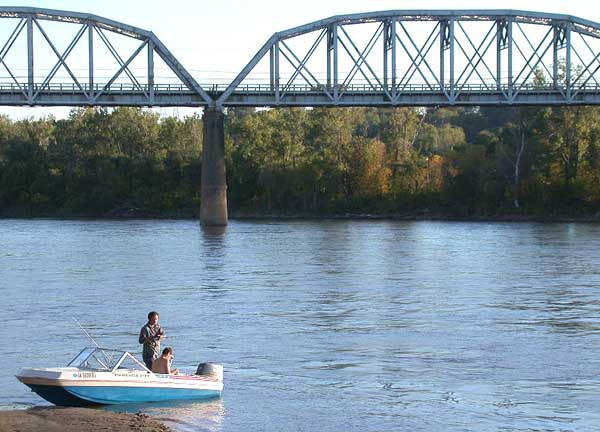
Fishermen on the Missouri River facing the Union Pacific Bridge

Union Pacific decided to upgrade the Missouri River crossing to handle the traffic and tonnage, and work began in May 1916. To keep this critical artery open, the replacement bridge was constructed on temporary wooden piles immediately upstream of the 1888 stone piers. Another set of piles was driven into the river bed on the downstream side of the piers. When the new bridge was completed, the old bridge was rigged with cables and winched from the stone piers to the temporary wood piles. The cables were rerigged to the new structure and it was pulled onto the stone piers. Tracks were connected and traffic resumed with just one hour of interruption. The 1888 bridge was then dismantled.

The approaches to the bridge were a mile and a half on each side. The Union Pacific initially committed to including a roadway with the bridge. However, it recanted, and it would not be until 1888 when the Douglas Street Bridge, later called the Ak-Sar-Ben Bridge, was opened as a roadway connecting the cities.

The bridge became the property of the UP when it absorbed the C&NW in 1995.

== See also ==
- List of bridges documented by the Historic American Engineering Record in Iowa
- List of bridges documented by the Historic American Engineering Record in Nebraska
- List of crossings of the Missouri River
