= Blair Bridge (Union Pacific Railroad) =

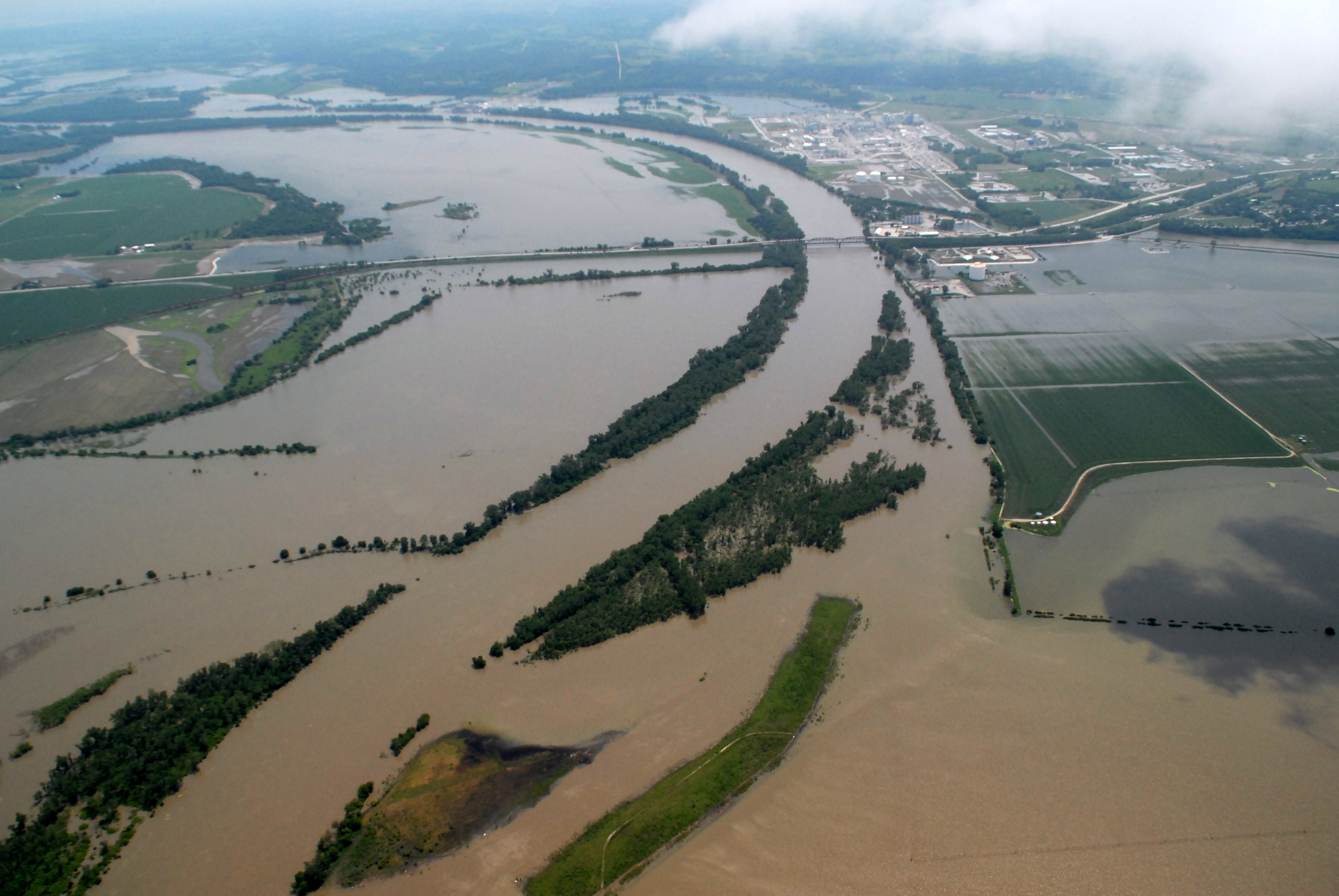
- The Blair Bridges on June 20, 2011, during the 2011 Missouri River floods. Both bridges were the only ones that could be used during the flood between Omaha and Sioux City.
- Coordinates: 41°33′05″N 96°05′44″W
- Carries: Union Pacific Railroad
- Crosses: Missouri River
- Locale: Blair, Nebraska, and Harrison County, Iowa, USA

The Blair Bridge carries the Union Pacific Railroad's Blair Subdivision between the U.S. states of Nebraska and Iowa, across the Missouri River near Blair, Nebraska. It was built in 1883 by the Sioux City and Pacific Rail Road, replacing a car ferry. Automobile traffic crosses via the parallel Blair Bridge (U.S. Route 30).

== See also ==
- List of bridges documented by the Historic American Engineering Record in Iowa
- List of bridges documented by the Historic American Engineering Record in Nebraska
- List of crossings of the Missouri River
