= Cincinnati Township, Harrison County, Iowa =

Coordinates: 41°33′N 96°01′W

Cincinnati Township
- Township
- Interactive map of Cincinnati Township
- Country: United States
- State: Iowa
- County: Harrison County
- Established: Unknown

Area
  - Total: 40.2 sq mi (104 km^{2})
  - Land: 39.0 sq mi (101 km^{2})
  - Water: 1.4 sq mi (3.6 km^{2})

Population
  - Total: 220
- Time zone: UTC-6 (CST)
  - Summer (DST): UTC-5 (CDT)

Cincinnati Township is located in Harrison County, Iowa. The population is 220 with 112 males and 108 females. The land area is 39.0 square miles (101 km^{2}) and the water area is 1.4 square miles.
