= Blair High School (Blair, Nebraska) =

Public school in Nebraska

Location
- 440 North 10th Street; Blair, (Washington County), Nebraska 68008; United States

Information
- Type: Public high school
- Principal: Tammy Holcomb
- Teaching staff: 46.10 (FTE)
- Enrollment: 697 (2023-2024)
- Student to teacher ratio: 15.12
- Colors: Purple and white
- Athletics conference: Eastern Midlands Conference
- Nickname: Bears

- Blair High School
- U.S. National Register of Historic Places
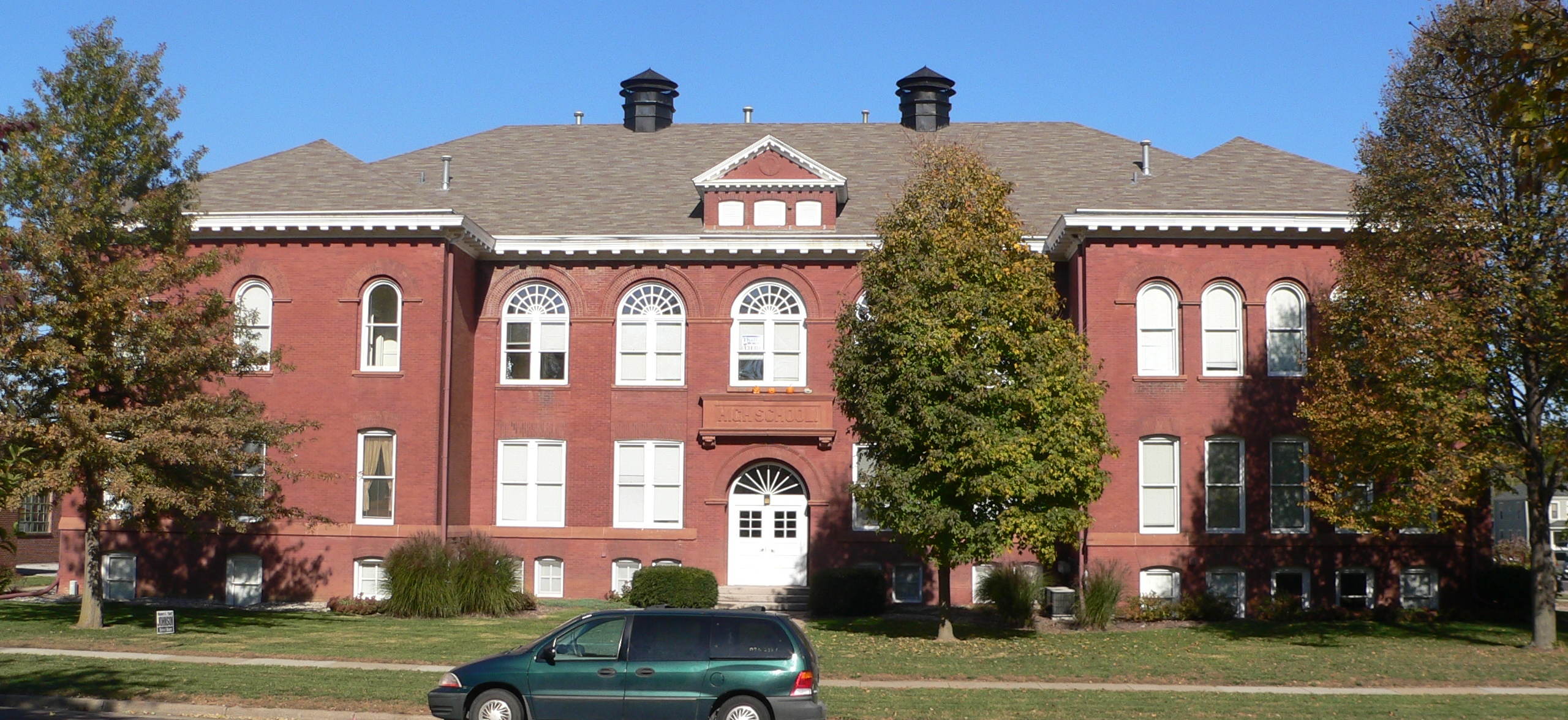
- Former high school building, built in 1899

- Location within Nebraska Location within the United States
- Location: Blair, Nebraska
- Coordinates: 41°32′24″N 96°8′12″W
- Built: 1899
- Architect: John Latenser, Sr.
- Architectural style: Colonial Revival, Romanesque
- NRHP reference No.: 91000300
- Added to NRHP: March 14, 1991

Blair High School is a public high school in Blair, Nebraska, United States. It is a part of Blair Community Schools. The 140,000-square-foot (13,000 m^{2}) building was built in 1970 at a cost of $2.2 million. Sitting on 75 acres (30 ha; 300,000 m^{2}) of land, it services approximately 750 students.

The school's former building, built in 1889, has been listed on the National Register of Historic Places since 1991. The original building was a two-story building in the Richardsonian Romanesque style, with a two-story Colonial Revival addition in 1929 and a one-story flat brick annex added in 1969. The building has been converted to apartments, offices, and a social hall.

The school's newspaper, known as The Bear Tracks, is a student-made paper consisting of seven sections, and is issued at the end of every academic quarter.

The school's colors are purple and white; its athletic teams are the Bears. Blair High School is a member of the Eastern Midlands Conference and competes in Class B athletics and in mostly Class A fine arts. Blair High School's main rivals include Elkhorn and Gretna.
