= Sioux City and Pacific Railroad =

The Sioux City and Pacific Railroad was a railroad in the U.S. states of Iowa and Nebraska. Built as a connection from Sioux City, Iowa to the Union Pacific Railroad at Fremont, Nebraska, it became part of the Chicago and North Western Railway system in the 1880s, and is now a main line of the Union Pacific (UP). The east–west portion from Fremont to Missouri Valley, Iowa, is the Blair Subdivision, carrying mainly westbound UP trains (most eastbounds use the Omaha Subdivision), and the line from California Junction, Iowa north to Sioux City is the Sioux City Subdivision.

== History ==
The Pacific Railway Act of 1862 defined a network of branches that would begin at the Missouri River and join the main line of the Union Pacific Railroad in or near Nebraska. The UP was required to build the branch from Sioux City, but an 1864 amendment released the UP from this obligation, allowing any railroad arriving at Sioux City from the east, or any newly incorporated railroad, to construct the line and gain the associated land grants. The Sioux City and Pacific Railroad was organized for this purpose in August 1864, and soon came under common ownership with the Cedar Rapids and Missouri River Railroad, a land-grant company, leased by the Chicago and North Western Railway, that completed its road across Iowa to Council Bluffs in April 1867. To build the portion in Nebraska, the Northern Nebraska Air Line Railroad was incorporated in June 1867 and merged into the Sioux City and Pacific in September 1868.

In August 1867 the Cedar Rapids and Missouri River opened a branch from Missouri Valley Junction west to California Junction (sold to the Sioux City and Pacific in July 1871), where the Sioux City and Pacific, funded by the Cedar Rapids and Missouri River, began constructing its line north through the Missouri River Valley, reaching Sioux City in February 1868. The line from California Junction west to Fremont, Nebraska was completed in early 1869, initially crossing the Missouri River via a car ferry. From 1870 until July 1884, the Sioux City and Pacific operated the Fremont, Elkhorn and Missouri Valley Railroad, which continued northwest from Fremont into northwestern Nebraska. (The Illinois Central Railroad subsidiary Iowa Falls and Sioux City Railroad opened the first eastern connection to Sioux City in October 1870.) The Blair Bridge opened in late 1883, replacing the car ferry across the Missouri River. In 1884, the Chicago and North Western acquired control of the Cedar Rapids and Missouri River and the connecting Chicago, Iowa and Nebraska Railroad, which had jointly purchased the Sioux City and Pacific in 1880. Operations remained separate until August 1901, when the C&NW leased and soon merged the company into itself. (During the previous month, the Sioux City and Pacific had bought the incomplete roadbed of the Moville Extension Railway, which the C&NW completed that year, branching off the main line at Sergeant Bluff and connecting to an existing C&NW line at Moville.)

The line became more important in the 1960s, when the point where the UP and C&NW interchanged transcontinental traffic was moved from Council Bluffs to Fremont, allowing for a shorter route via Blair. After the UP acquired control of the C&NW in 1995, it implemented directional running in late 1996, taking eastbound trains (including Powder River Basin coal) over the longer but flatter Omaha Subdivision through Council Bluffs. However, high-priority "Z" intermodal trains use the Blair Subdivision in both directions.

== See also ==
- Sioux City & Pacific R.R. Co. v. Stout
