= Blair, Nebraska =

City in and county seat of Washington County, Nebraska, United States

- City
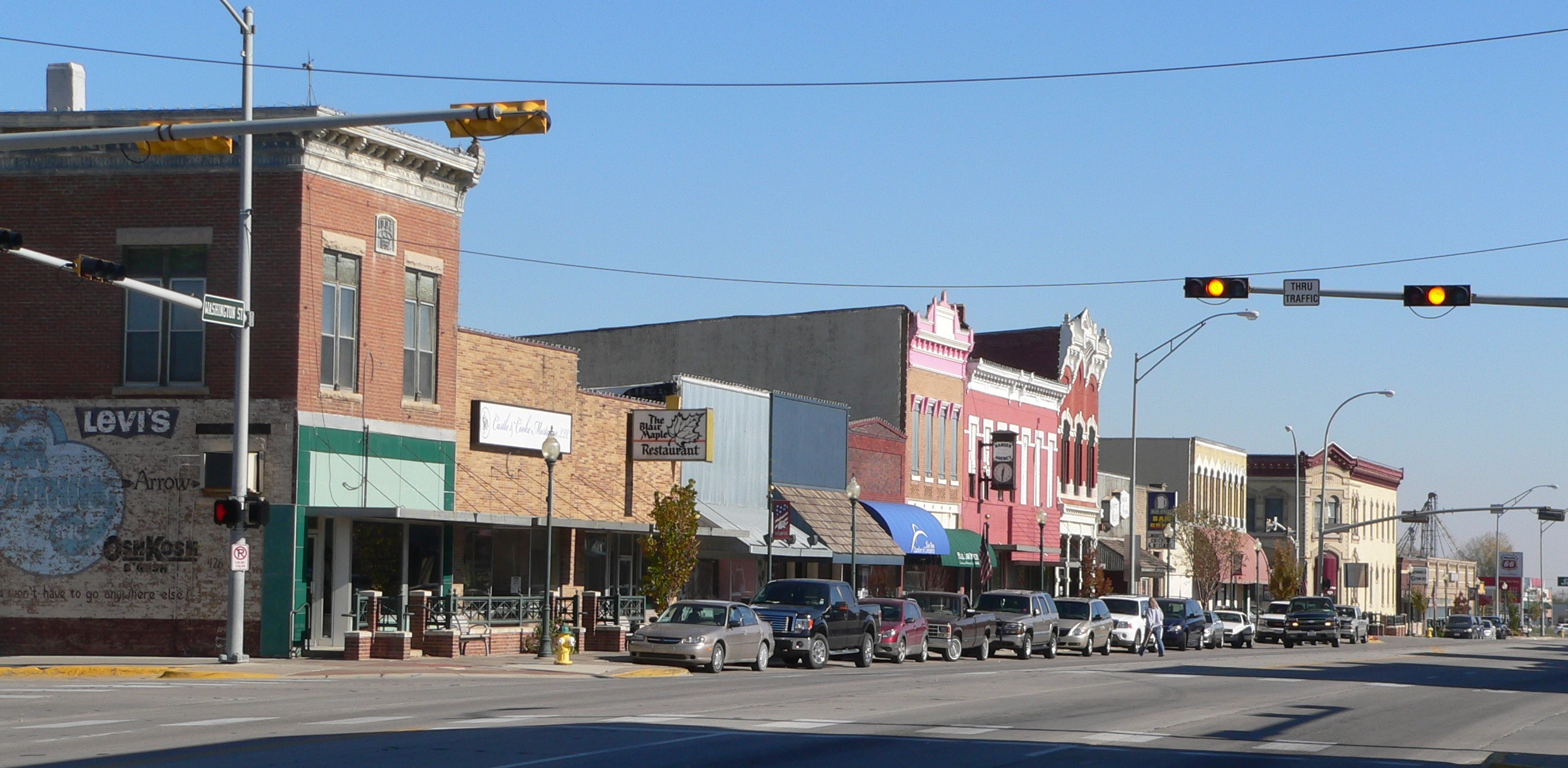
- Washington Street in Blair, November 2010

- Location of Blair within Washington County and Nebraska

- Location within the United States
- Coordinates: 41°32′45″N 96°06′48″W
- Country: United States
- State: Nebraska
- County: Washington

Government
  - Type: Mayor-council government
  - Mayor: Mindy Rump

Area
  - Total: 5.53 sq mi (14.32 km^{2})
  - Land: 5.51 sq mi (14.27 km^{2})
  - Water: 0.019 sq mi (0.05 km^{2})
- Elevation: 1,089 ft (332 m)

Population (2020)
  - Total: 7,790
  - Density: 1,413.6/sq mi (545.78/km^{2})
- Time zone: UTC-6 (Central (CST))
  - Summer (DST): UTC-5 (CDT)
- ZIP codes: 68008-68009
- Area code: 402
- FIPS code: 31-05350
- GNIS feature ID: 2394184
- Website: www.blairne.gov

Blair is a city in and the county seat of Washington County, Nebraska, United States. As of the 2020 census, Blair had a population of 7,790. Blair is a part of the Omaha-Council Bluffs Metropolitan Statistical Area.

== History ==
Blair was platted in 1869 when the Sioux City and Pacific Railroad was extended to that point. It was named for railroad magnate John Insley Blair, who was credited with bringing the railroad to town. Blair was incorporated as a city in 1872. Within its first year, Blair was designated county seat.

In March 1869, a small child playing on a railroad turntable in town was injured on the turntable. The father sued the railway for damages, leading all the way up to the Supreme Court of the United States in the 1873 case Sioux City & Pacific Railroad Co. v. Stout.

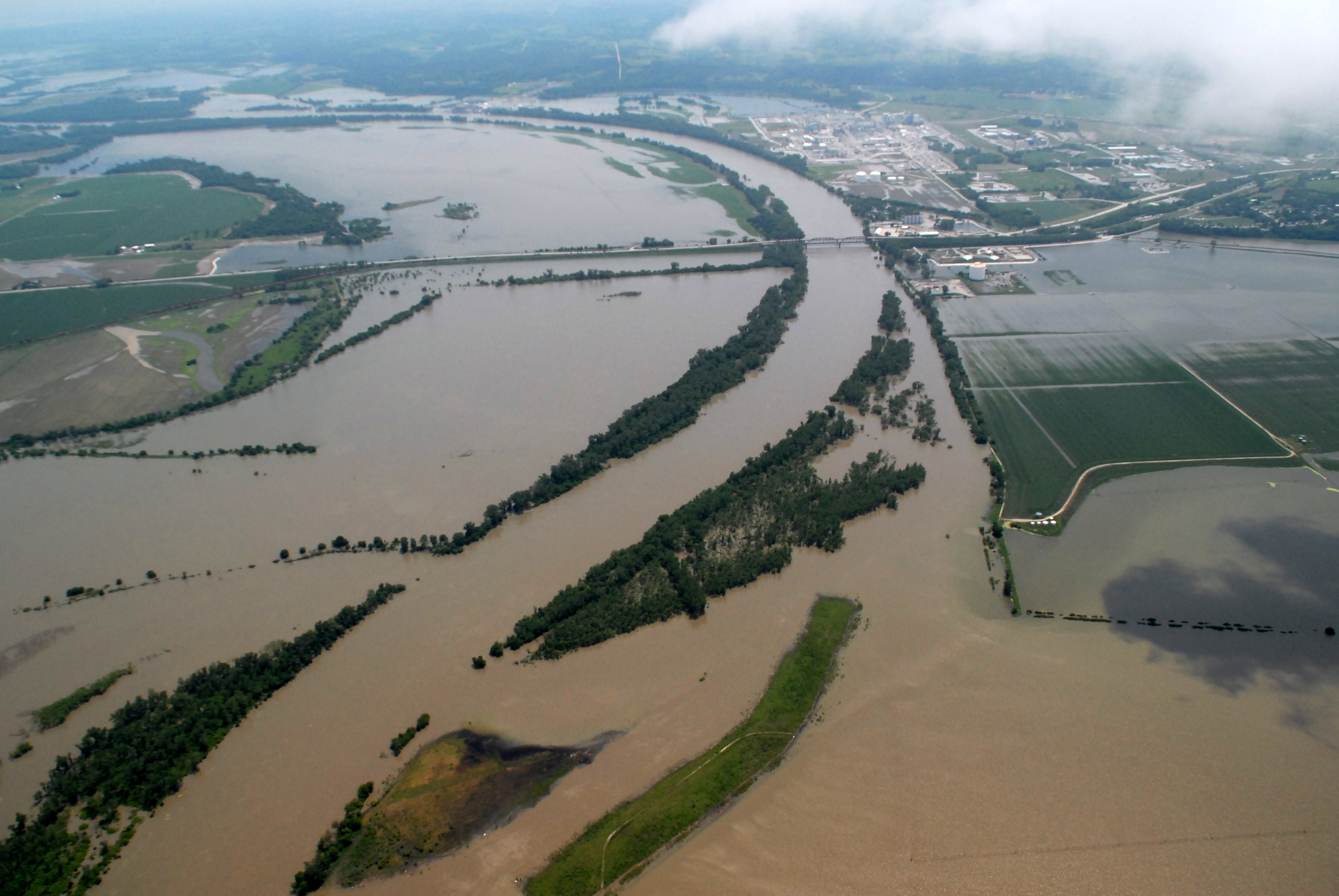
Blair and the Blair Bridge on June 20, 2011, during the 2011 Missouri River floods

In 1874, during the Panic of 1873, a grasshopper storm enveloped the region. Many Nebraskans were faced with starvation. An organization, the Nebraska Relief and Aid Society was formed in order to help affected persons. A law was passed by congress awarding $100,000 relief, and many Blair citizens were awarded money. Both the newspapers and the railroads in the region helped transport supplies free of charge. Both the Nebraska State Guard and the United States Army helped distribute food and clothing.

Construction of the Chicago and Northwestern Bridge across the Missouri River was authorized by an Act of Congress on June 27, 1882. Construction began in September 1882, and it was open for rail traffic in November 1883. The total cost of the bridge was $1.13 Million ($34.2 Million in 2023). The first automobile bridge was opened to traffic in 1929.

In 1916, Blair was awarded a $10,000 grant to build a Carnegie Library. Unfortunately, an electrical fire occurred on the night of July 23, 1973, and the historic library was deemed a total loss.

On April 26, 2024, portions of Blair were struck by a large EF4 tornado, destroying or damaging dozens of homes.

== Geography ==
According to the United States Census Bureau, the city has a total area of 5.51 square miles (14.27 km^{2}), of which 5.49 square miles (14.22 km^{2}) is land and 0.02 square miles (0.05 km^{2}) is water.

Blair is located in the Loess Hills, surrounded on all sides by rolling hills and the Missouri river valley.

=== Climate ===
Climate data for Blair, NE (1991-2020, coordinates:41.5536°N 96.1406°W)
| Month | Jan | Feb | Mar | Apr | May | Jun | Jul | Aug | Sep | Oct | Nov | Dec | Year |
|---|---|---|---|---|---|---|---|---|---|---|---|---|---|
| Mean daily maximum °F (°C) | 31.3 (−0.4) | 36.5 (2.5) | 50.4 (10.2) | 61.9 (16.6) | 72.7 (22.6) | 81.8 (27.7) | 85.6 (29.8) | 83.4 (28.6) | 77.2 (25.1) | 65.4 (18.6) | 49.3 (9.6) | 36.2 (2.3) | 61.0 (16.1) |
| Daily mean °F (°C) | 22.2 (−5.4) | 26.7 (−2.9) | 38.8 (3.8) | 49.8 (9.9) | 61.4 (16.3) | 71.1 (21.7) | 75.1 (23.9) | 73.1 (22.8) | 65.4 (18.6) | 53.4 (11.9) | 38.6 (3.7) | 27.1 (−2.7) | 50.2 (10.1) |
| Mean daily minimum °F (°C) | 13.0 (−10.6) | 16.9 (−8.4) | 27.2 (−2.7) | 37.7 (3.2) | 50.2 (10.1) | 60.4 (15.8) | 64.7 (18.2) | 62.8 (17.1) | 53.5 (11.9) | 41.4 (5.2) | 28.0 (−2.2) | 18.1 (−7.7) | 39.5 (4.2) |
| Average precipitation inches (mm) | 0.76 (19) | 0.94 (24) | 1.86 (47) | 3.21 (82) | 4.77 (121) | 4.94 (125) | 3.34 (85) | 3.92 (100) | 3.30 (84) | 2.45 (62) | 1.36 (35) | 1.26 (32) | 32.11 (816) |
| Average dew point °F (°C) | 15.9 (−8.9) | 19.8 (−6.8) | 28.5 (−1.9) | 37.4 (3.0) | 49.4 (9.7) | 60.5 (15.8) | 66.5 (19.2) | 65.0 (18.3) | 55.4 (13.0) | 41.2 (5.1) | 29.7 (−1.3) | 20.9 (−6.2) | 40.8 (4.9) |
Source 1: NOAA
Source 2: PRISM Climate Group (precipitation-dew point)

== Demographics ==
Historical population
| Census | Pop. | Note | %± |
|---|---|---|---|
| 1870 | 494 | | — |
| 1880 | 1,317 | | 166.6% |
| 1890 | 2,069 | | 57.1% |
| 1900 | 2,970 | | 43.5% |
| 1910 | 2,584 | | −13.0% |
| 1920 | 2,702 | | 4.6% |
| 1930 | 2,791 | | 3.3% |
| 1940 | 3,289 | | 17.8% |
| 1950 | 3,815 | | 16.0% |
| 1960 | 4,931 | | 29.3% |
| 1970 | 6,106 | | 23.8% |
| 1980 | 6,418 | | 5.1% |
| 1990 | 6,860 | | 6.9% |
| 2000 | 7,512 | | 9.5% |
| 2010 | 7,990 | | 6.4% |
| 2020 | 7,790 | | −2.5% |
U.S. Decennial Census; 2013 Estimate

=== 2020 census ===
As of the 2020 census, Blair had a population of 7,790. The median age was 40.8 years. 24.1% of residents were under the age of 18 and 20.4% of residents were 65 years of age or older. For every 100 females there were 92.1 males, and for every 100 females age 18 and over there were 89.2 males age 18 and over.

99.3% of residents lived in urban areas, while 0.7% lived in rural areas.

There were 3,221 households in Blair, of which 30.2% had children under the age of 18 living in them. Of all households, 47.9% were married-couple households, 16.9% were households with a male householder and no spouse or partner present, and 28.0% were households with a female householder and no spouse or partner present. About 31.9% of all households were made up of individuals and 16.2% had someone living alone who was 65 years of age or older.

There were 3,431 housing units, of which 6.1% were vacant. The homeowner vacancy rate was 1.9% and the rental vacancy rate was 7.6%.

Racial composition as of the 2020 census
| Race | Number | Percent |
|---|---|---|
| White | 7,215 | 92.6% |
| Black or African American | 32 | 0.4% |
| American Indian and Alaska Native | 12 | 0.2% |
| Asian | 41 | 0.5% |
| Native Hawaiian and Other Pacific Islander | 3 | 0.0% |
| Some other race | 99 | 1.3% |
| Two or more races | 388 | 5.0% |
| Hispanic or Latino (of any race) | 292 | 3.7% |

=== Income and poverty ===
The 2016–2020 5-year American Community Survey estimates show that the median household income was $57,274 (with a margin of error of +/- $7,379) and the median family income $76,838 (+/- $17,661). Males had a median income of $51,769 (+/- $5,822) versus $29,811 (+/- $7,842) for females. The median income for those above 16 years old was $39,382 (+/- $3,150). Approximately, 11.6% of families and 13.6% of the population were below the poverty line, including 18.7% of those under the age of 18 and 7.9% of those ages 65 or over.

=== 2010 census ===
At the 2010 census there were 7,990 people, 3,110 households, and 2,005 families living in the city. The population density was 1,455.4 inhabitants per square mile (561.9/km^{2}). There were 3,351 housing units at an average density of 610.4 units per square mile (235.7 units/km^{2}). The racial makeup of the city was 96.4% White, 0.8% African American, 0.3% Native American, 0.3% Asian, 0.1% Pacific Islander, 1.0% from other races, and 1.1% from two or more races. Hispanic or Latino of any race were 2.9%.

Of the 3,110 households 33.3% had children under the age of 18 living with them, 50.5% were married couples living together, 10.6% had a female householder with no husband present, 3.3% had a male householder with no wife present, and 35.5% were non-families. 30.3% of households were one person and 13.4% were one person aged 65 or older. The average household size was 2.40 and the average family size was 3.01.

The median age was 36 years. 24.9% of residents were under the age of 18; 11.7% were between the ages of 18 and 24; 23.9% were from 25 to 44; 24.3% were from 45 to 64; and 15.3% were 65 or older. The gender makeup of the city was 47.9% male and 52.1% female.

=== 2000 census ===
At the 2000 census, there were 7,512 people, 2,871 households, and 1,891 families living in the city. The population density was 1,617.3 inhabitants per square mile (624.4/km^{2}). There were 3,033 housing units at an average density of 653.0 units per square mile (252.1 units/km^{2}). The racial makeup of the city was 97.43% White, 0.44% African American, 0.29% Native American, 0.33% Asian, 0.27% Pacific Islander, 0.33% from other races, and 0.91% from two or more races. Hispanic or Latino of any race were 1.34% of the population.

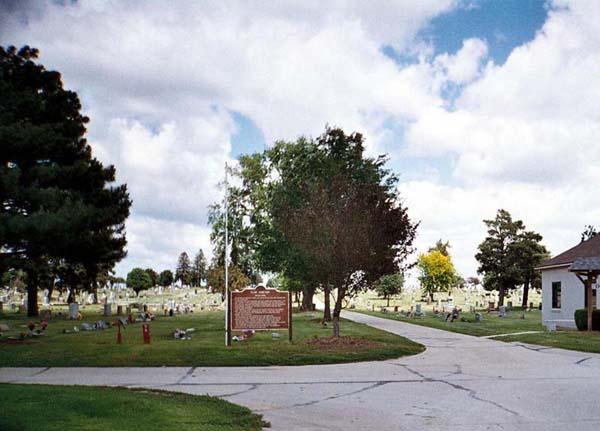
Entrance to Blair Cemetery 2007

Of the 2,871 households 33.9% had children under the age of 18 living with them, 52.8% were married couples living together, 10.1% had a female householder with no husband present, and 34.1% were non-families. 29.1% of households were one person and 14.4% were one person aged 65 or older. The average household size was 2.43 and the average family size was 3.02.

The age distribution was 24.9% under the age of 18, 13.8% from 18 to 24, 25.6% from 25 to 44, 20.4% from 45 to 64, and 15.4% 65 or older. The median age was 35 years. For every 100 females, there were 90.9 males. For every 100 females age 18 and over, there were 88.2 males.

The median household income was $41,214, and the median family income was $52,114. Males had a median income of $36,839 versus $25,452 for females. The per capita income for the city was $19,240. About 6.2% of families and 8.4% of the population were below the poverty line, including 11.4% of those under age 18 and 10.5% of those age 65 or over.

== Media ==
Blair is served by the local weekly newspaper Pilot-Tribune & Enterprise. Blair is also served by Walnut Radio Station 97.3 KOBM-FM and FM 94.7 KYTF-LP Blair Radio.

== Points of interest ==
- Part of the Nebraska Statewide Arboretum collection
- From 1896 to 1954, Blair was home to Trinity Seminary, a school of the United Evangelical Lutheran Church
- Blair is located along the historic Lincoln Highway
- Tower of the Four Winds at Black Elk-Neihardt Park stands as a memorial to John G. Neihardt and Black Elk, the Lakota Sioux holy man

== Education ==
It is a part of the Blair Community Schools which operates Blair High School.

Blair was home to the now defunct Dana College (1884 to 2010).

== Notable people ==
- Kent Bellows - artist
- Clete Blakeman - professional football official
- Bob Cerv - baseball player
- Bill Danenhauer - professional wrestler
- Mike Hollingshead - photographer
- Megan Hunt - Nebraska State Senator, Legislative District 8
- Mick Mines - Nebraska state senator
- Otto Schmidt - US Navy Medal of Honor recipient
- Tom Seaton - baseball player
- Paul Simon - Democratic Congressman, Senator, and presidential candidate
- Rod Whitaker - novelist

== See also ==
- List of municipalities in Nebraska
- Washington County Historical Association
