= Bennington High School (Bennington, Nebraska) =

Coordinates: 41°21′56″N 96°10′34″W

- 16610 Bennington Road; Bennington, Douglas County, Nebraska 68007; United States

Information
- Type: Public
- School district: Bennington Public Schools
- Principal: Greg Lamberty
- Teaching staff: 63.58 (on an FTE basis)
- Grades: 9–12
- Enrollment: 1,031 (2023–2024)
- Student to teacher ratio: 16.22
- Campus type: Rural (fringe)
- Colors: Royal Blue and White
- Mascot: Tuffy the Badger
- Team name: Badgers
- Website: www.benningtonschools.org/index.cfm?tab=sr

Bennington High School is a high school in Bennington, Nebraska, United States, part of the Bennington Public Schools. It is a public school with an enrollment of 957 students as of the 2021–2022 school year. The school serves grades 9–12.

The mascot of Bennington High School's athletic teams is a badger nicknamed “Tuffy”. The school colors are royal blue and white.
