= Iowa Highway 141 =

Highway in Iowa

Iowa Highway 141
- Iowa 141 highlighted in red

Route information
- Maintained by Iowa DOT
- Length: 155.362 mi (250.031 km)
- Existed: 1926–present

Major junctions
- West end: I-29 / CR K42 at Sloan
- Iowa 175 at Mapleton; US 30 / US 59 at Denison; US 71 at Templeton; Iowa 4 near Bagley; US 169 at Bouton; Iowa 44 at Grimes
- East end: I-35 / I-80 at Urbandale

Location
- Country: United States
- State: Iowa
- Counties: Woodbury; Monona; Crawford; Carroll; Guthrie; Dallas; Polk

Highway system
- Iowa Primary Highway System; Interstate; US; State; Secondary; Scenic
← Iowa 140	→ Iowa 143

Iowa Highway 141 (Iowa 141) is an east–west highway in the western and central portions of the state. It is the most direct link between Sioux City and Des Moines. It also serves as an expressway link between Des Moines and the outlying communities of Perry, Granger, and Grimes. Iowa 141 begins near Sloan at an interchange with Interstate 29 (I-29) at ends at another interchange with I-35 /I-80 on the edge of the Des Moines suburbs of Urbandale and Grimes.

== Route description ==
Iowa 141 begins at I-29 just west of Sloan. It goes east through Sloan and Hornick before meeting Iowa 31 in Smithland. It then turns southeast and at Mapleton meets Iowa 175, with which it forms a wrong-way concurrency, as eastbound Iowa 141 goes the same direction as westbound Iowa 175. They separate and Iowa 141 continues southeast before going south into Ute, where it meets Iowa 183. At Ute, it turns east and passes through Charter Oak before meeting U.S. Highway 59 (US 59) northwest of Denison. While in Denison, it meets Iowa 39 and has another wrong-way concurrency with westbound US 30. South of Denison, US 59 and Iowa 141 separate.

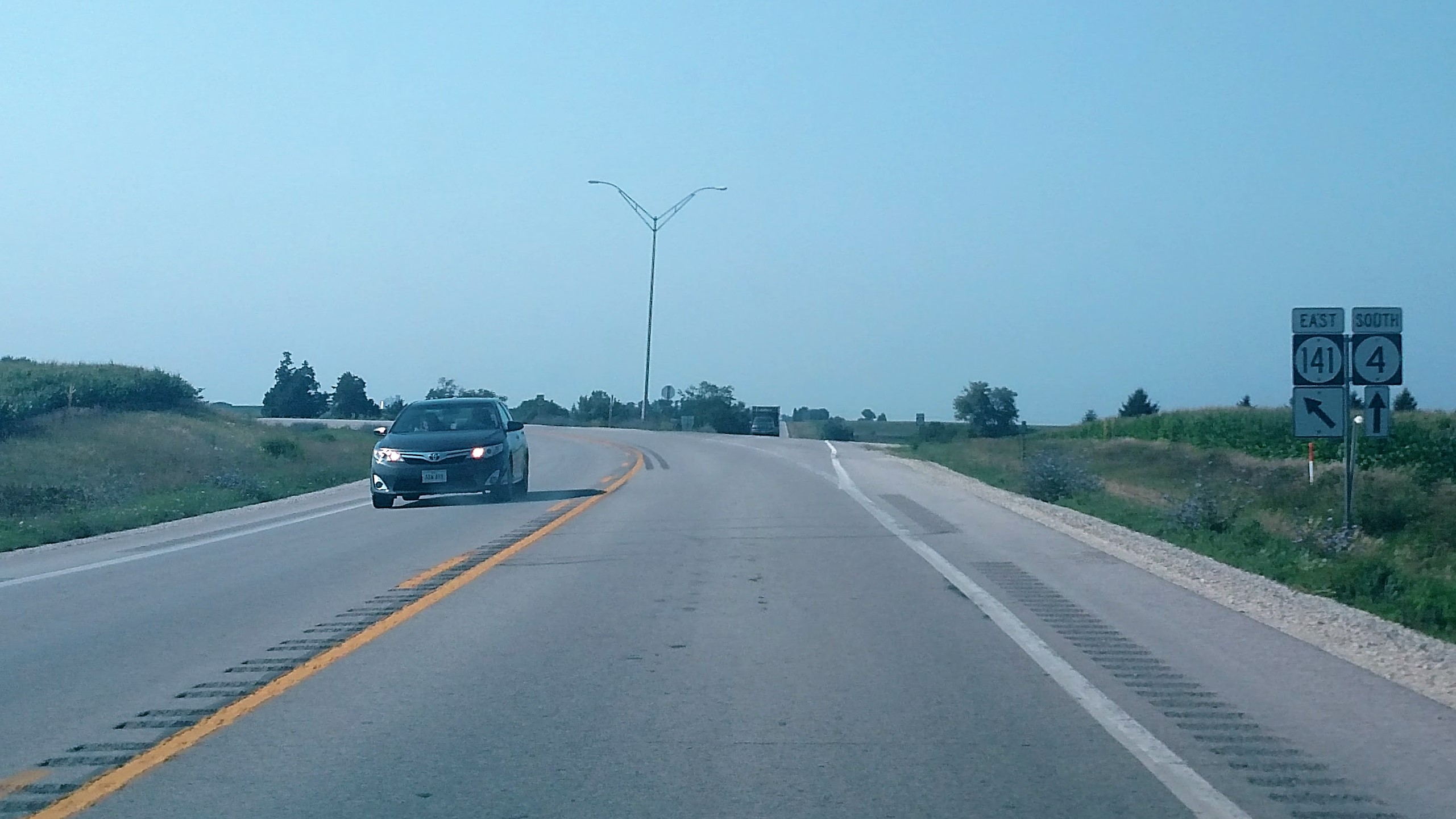
Iowa 4/Iowa 141 overlap ends near Jamaica

Iowa 141 turns east and passes through Aspinwall and Manning before meeting US 71 south of Templeton. Iowa 141 and US 71 run concurrently for 3 miles (4.8 km) before separating west of Dedham. It continues east, bypasses Dedham and turns southeast briefly before going east to go through Coon Rapids. After another brief southeasterly turn, it goes east and passes through Bayard, where it meets Iowa 25. They run together for 3 miles (4.8 km), then separate. After passing through Bagley, Iowa 141 meets Iowa 4, with which it briefly runs concurrent. After passing south of Jamaica and Dawson, it meets Iowa 144 in Perry and the highway turns into a divided highway, which it will be for the rest of its length.

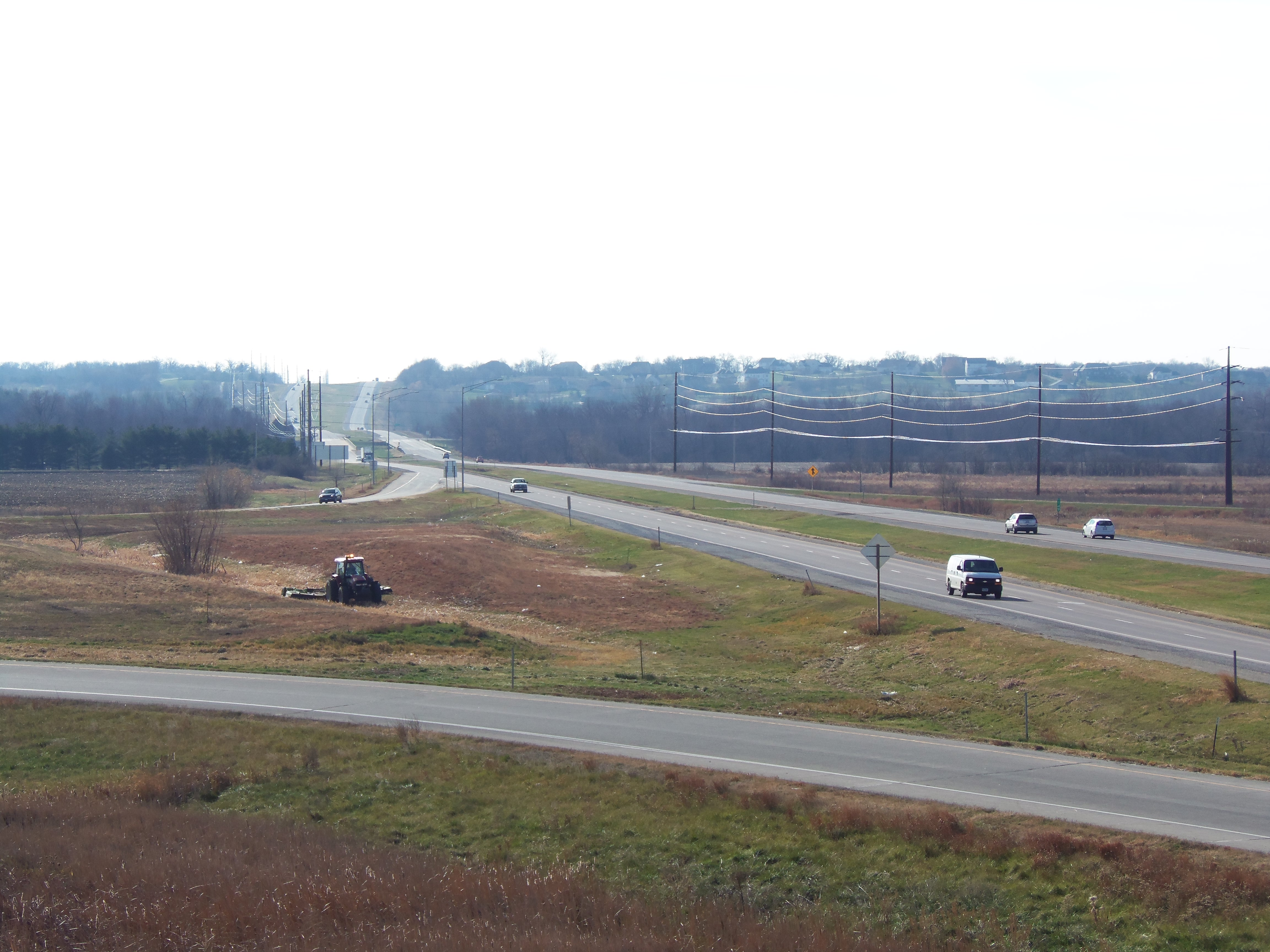
Looking south at Iowa 141 from the Iowa 415 exit

After passing through Perry, Iowa 141 continues east and meets US 169 near Bouton. Near Woodward, it meets Iowa 210 and turns southeast to go towards the Des Moines area. At Granger, it meets Iowa 17 and shortly thereafter meets Iowa 415, where it then turns south. It then passes through Grimes and meets Iowa 44. It then enters Urbandale and quickly ends at an interchange with I-35 /I-80.

== History ==
Iowa 141 originally ran from Sioux City to Denison but was extended to the Des Moines area in 1941. In 1961, the highway was realigned so that it no longer entered Sioux City. The new segment went west from Smithland to Sloan, while the original segment from Smithland to Sioux City was designated as Iowa 982. This section was then handed over to Woodbury county in 2003 to become County Road D25. Between 1975 and 1977, Iowa 141 was upgraded to a four lane divided highway between Perry and I-35 /I-80.

== Major intersections ==
County	Location	mi	km	Exit	Destinations	Notes
Woodbury	Sloan Township	0.000	0.000		I-29 / CR K42 west – Council Bluffs, Sioux City	Exit 127 on I-29; road continues as CR K42
Woodbury	Smithland	16.276	26.194		Iowa 31 north / CR L12 south (Hickory Street) – Anthon, Rodney	
Monona	Mapleton	24.503	39.434		Iowa 175 east – Danbury	Western end of Iowa 175 overlap
Monona	Mapleton	25.104	40.401		Iowa 175 west (Front Street) – Castana	Eastern end of Iowa 175 overlap
Monona	Ute	35.975	57.896		Iowa 183 south (Monona Avenue) – Soldier	
Crawford	Goodrich–Denison township line	52.755	84.901		US 59 north – Schleswig, Ida Grove	Western end of US 59 overlap
Crawford	Denison	54.701	88.033		Iowa 39 north – Odebolt	
Crawford	Denison	55.358	89.090		US 30 east (4th Street) – Carroll	Western end of US 30 overlap
Crawford	Denison	55.890	89.946		US 30 west – Dunlap	Eastern end of US 30 overlap
Crawford	Washington Township	62.983	101.361		US 59 south – Harlan	Eastern end of US 59 overlap
Carroll	Eden Township	83.947	135.100		US 71 south / CR N18 north – Templeton, Audubon	Western end of US 71 overlap
Carroll	Eden Township	86.939	139.915		US 71 north – Carroll	Eastern end of US 71 overlap
Guthrie	Bayard	105.213	169.324		Iowa 25 north – Scranton	Western end of Iowa 25 overlap
Guthrie	Dodge Township	108.225	174.171		Iowa 25 south – Guthrie Center	Eastern end of Iowa 25 overlap
Guthrie	Richland Township	114.728	184.637		Iowa 4 north – Jefferson	Western end of Iowa 4 overlap
Guthrie	Richland Township	115.174	185.355		Iowa 4 south – Panora	Eastern end of Iowa 4 overlap
Dallas	Perry	128.864	207.387		Iowa 144 north / CR P58 south – Rippey	
Dallas	Beaver Township	132.947	213.957	132	US 169 – Ogden, Adel	Interchange
Dallas	Woodward	138.947	223.614	138	Iowa 210 east – Woodward, Woodward Resource Center	Interchange
Dallas	Des Moines Township	140.174	225.588		CR R22 south (T Avenue) to Iowa 44	At-grade intersection
Dallas–Polk county line	Granger	146.815	236.276	146	Iowa 17 north – Madrid, Boone	Interchange
Polk	Jefferson Township	148.977	239.755	148	Iowa 415 south (NW Saylorville Drive) – Polk City	Interchange
Polk	Grimes	152.500	245.425	152	Iowa 44 west – Grimes, Saylorville Lake	Interchange
Polk	Urbandale	155.362	250.031		I-35 / I-80 – Council Bluffs, Davenport, Kansas City, Minneapolis	Exit 127 on I-35 / I-80; road continues southeast as Urbandale Drive
1.000 mi = 1.609 km; 1.000 km = 0.621 mi: Concurrency terminus
