= Holy Guardian Angels Church and Cemetery Historic District =

Historic site in Carroll County, Iowa

- U.S. National Register of Historic Places
- U.S. Historic district
- Location within Iowa Location within the United States
- Location: Jade Ave. and 245th St. Roselle, Iowa
- Coordinates: 42°0′1.8″N 94°55′2.1″W
- Area: less than one acre
- Built: 1904
- Architectural style: Gothic Revival
- NRHP reference No.: 04001424
- Added to NRHP: May 9, 2019

Holy Guardian Angels Church and Cemetery Historic District is a nationally recognized historic district located in Roselle, Iowa, United States. Holy Guardian Angels is a former Catholic parish of the Diocese of Sioux City. The historic district made up of the former parish church and cemetery was listed on the National Register of Historic Places in 2019. It is significant for the architecture of the Gothic Revival church and the influence of the German-Catholic immigrants who settled the area.

== Church ==
Lambert Kniest bought 23,000 acres (9,300 ha) of land in Carroll County that would become known as Mount Carmel. Bishop John Hennessy of Dubuque sent German Catholics to settle the area and start farms. They established the county's first Catholic church in 1868. Catholics from Roselle traveled there for Mass until 1874 when they founded their own parish and built a frame church, which the called Heilige Schutzengels Kirche (Holy Guardian Angels Church). Except for four families who were Lutheran, the community was made up of Catholics. Carroll County would grow to have the highest concentration of German Americans of any county in Iowa.

As the parish and town grew they needed a new church, and they built the present structure in 1904. There was no railroad into Roselle, so the building materials had to be hauled 3 miles (4.8 km) into the town using horse-drawn wagons on primitive roads. It took more than a year to build the church and cost the parish $48,000. The brick Gothic Revival church features an Indiana limestone foundation and a central tower that rises 145 feet (44 m). The vaulted ceiling in the interior rises 39 feet (12 m) above gilded altars, numerous statues of saints and angels, elaborate stained glass windows, frescos, and mosaics. The last renovation of the church was carried out by Langenfeld Studios in 1929.

A parochial school was established by the parish in 1888, and the Franciscan Sisters of Perpetual Adoration from La Crosse, Wisconsin began teaching there in 1899. There was a dormitory for the students who boarded there in the winter months. The parish added a junior high school building in 1916, and the parish schools served the community until they were incorporated into the Kuemper Catholic School System in Carroll in 1975. In 1977, the original school building was torn down and the junior high building was moved to a different location.

The Diocese of Sioux City has subsequently closed Holy Guardian Angels Parish. The Holy Angels Church and Cemetery Foundation was incorporated with the State of Iowa in 1995 to care for the parish property.

== Cemetery ==
The parish cemetery is located to the north of the church. Its earliest burial is from 1863. The grave markers include obelisk and cross designs and iron crosses that were possibly made by local blacksmiths, which would have been the custom for that time. Numerous markers are engraved with German script.
