= Wheatland Township, Carroll County, Iowa =

Township in Iowa, US

Wheatland Township, Carroll County
- Township
- Coordinates: 42°09′58″N 095°01′36″W
- Country: United States
- State: Iowa
- County: Carroll

Area
  - Total: 35.4 sq mi (91.6 km^{2})
  - Land: 35.35 sq mi (91.56 km^{2})
  - Water: 0.015 sq mi (0.04 km^{2})
- Elevation: 1,348 ft (411 m)

Population (2000)
  - Total: 728
  - Density: 21/sq mi (8/km^{2})
- FIPS code: 19-94704
- GNIS feature ID: 0468990

Wheatland Township is one of eighteen townships in Carroll County, Iowa, USA. As of the 2000 census, its population was 728.

== Geography ==
Wheatland Township covers an area of 35.37 square miles (91.6 km^{2}) and contains one incorporated settlement, Breda. According to the USGS, it contains one cemetery, Wheatland.
