= Kuemper =

Kuemper is a surname. Notable people with the surname include:

- Darcy Kuemper (born 1990), Canadian professional ice hockey goaltender

== See also ==
- Kuemper Catholic School System, in Iowa
