= Arcadia Township, Carroll County, Iowa =

Township in Iowa, US

Arcadia Township, Carroll County
- Township
- Coordinates: 42°04′40″N 095°01′49″W
- Country: United States
- State: Iowa
- County: Carroll

Area
  - Total: 36.2 sq mi (93.8 km^{2})
  - Land: 36.20 sq mi (93.77 km^{2})
  - Water: 0.0077 sq mi (0.02 km^{2})
- Elevation: 1,434 ft (437 m)

Population (2000)
  - Total: 752
  - Density: 21/sq mi (8/km^{2})
- FIPS code: 19-90075
- GNIS feature ID: 0467397

Arcadia Township is one of eighteen townships in Carroll County, Iowa, United States. As of the 2000 census, its population was 752.

== Geography ==
Arcadia Township covers an area of 36.21 square miles (93.8 km^{2}) and contains one incorporated settlement, Arcadia. According to the USGS, it contains two cemeteries: Arcadia and Saint Johns.
