= Roselle Township, Carroll County, Iowa =

Township in Iowa, US

Roselle Township, Carroll County
- Township
- Coordinates: 41°59′25″N 094°55′08″W
- Country: United States
- State: Iowa
- County: Carroll

Area
  - Total: 35.19 sq mi (91.14 km^{2})
  - Land: 35.19 sq mi (91.14 km^{2})
  - Water: 0 sq mi (0 km^{2})
- Elevation: 1,332 ft (406 m)

Population (2000)
  - Total: 670
  - Density: 19/sq mi (7.4/km^{2})
- FIPS code: 19-93699
- GNIS feature ID: 0468642

Roselle Township is one of eighteen townships in Carroll County, Iowa, USA. As of the 2000 census, its population was 670.

== Geography ==
Roselle Township covers an area of 35.19 square miles (91.1 km^{2}) and contains one incorporated settlement, Halbur. According to the USGS, it contains two cemeteries: Holy Angels and Saint Augustine.
