= Sheridan Township, Carroll County, Iowa =

Township in Iowa, US

Sheridan Township, Carroll County
- Township
- Coordinates: 42°10′02″N 094°48′26″W
- Country: United States
- State: Iowa
- County: Carroll

Area
  - Total: 34.82 sq mi (90.19 km^{2})
  - Land: 34.81 sq mi (90.17 km^{2})
  - Water: 0.0039 sq mi (0.01 km^{2})
- Elevation: 1,220 ft (372 m)

Population (2000)
  - Total: 461
  - Density: 13/sq mi (5.1/km^{2})
- FIPS code: 19-93840
- GNIS feature ID: 0468691

Sheridan Township is one of eighteen townships in Carroll County, Iowa, USA. As of the 2000 census, its population was 461.

== Geography ==
Sheridan Township covers an area of 34.82 square miles (90.2 km^{2}) and contains one incorporated settlement, Lidderdale. According to the USGS, it contains two cemeteries: East Liberty and Immanuel.
