= Pleasant Valley Township, Carroll County, Iowa =

Township in Iowa, US

Pleasant Valley Township, Carroll County
- Township
- Coordinates: 41°59′43″N 094°48′10″W
- Country: United States
- State: Iowa
- County: Carroll

Area
  - Total: 34.69 sq mi (89.84 km^{2})
  - Land: 34.66 sq mi (89.77 km^{2})
  - Water: 0.027 sq mi (0.07 km^{2})
- Elevation: 1,217 ft (371 m)

Population (2000)
  - Total: 415
  - Density: 12/sq mi (4.6/km^{2})
- FIPS code: 19-93405
- GNIS feature ID: 0468543

Pleasant Valley Township is one of eighteen townships in Carroll County, Iowa, USA. As of the 2000 census, its population was 415.

== Geography ==
Pleasant Valley Township covers an area of 34.69 square miles (89.8 km^{2}) and contains one incorporated settlement, Willey. According to the USGS, it contains one cemetery, Saint Mary's Catholic.
