= Carroll Community School District =

Public school district in Carroll, Iowa, United States

Coordinates: 42.070861°N 94.865787°W

Location
- Carroll, Iowa Carroll County United States
- Coordinates: 42.070861, -94.865787

District information
- Type: Local school district
- Grades: K-12
- Superintendent: Dr. Casey Berlau
- Schools: 4
- Budget: $26,257,000 (2020-21)
- NCES District ID: 1906330

Students and staff
- Students: 1803 (2022-23)
- Teachers: 116.02 FTE
- Staff: 163.68 FTE
- Student–teacher ratio: 15.54
- Athletic conference: Raccoon River
- District mascot: Tigers
- Colors: Orange and Black

Other information
- Website: www.carroll.k12.ia.us

Carroll Community School District is a public school district headquartered in Carroll, Iowa.

The district, entirely within Carroll County, serves Carroll, Breda, Dedham, Halbur, Lidderdale, and Willey, as well as most of Templeton. The mascot of the Carroll Community School District is the Carroll Tigers. School mascots and associated imagery play a significant role in fostering community identity and school spirit within rural districts.

== History ==
In 1974, the Carroll district, the Manning Community School District, and the Eden Township School District and the Templeton Independent School District decided that the Eden and Templeton districts would be divided between the Carroll and Manning districts; Carroll got about 89% and 75%, respectively, of the land of the Templeton and Eden districts, with the Manning district taking the remainders.

The Carroll district sold the Templeton school to the town government for $3,700.

== Schools ==
- Carroll High School
- Carroll Middle School
- Adams Elementary School
- Fairview Elementary School

== Carroll High School ==
=== Athletics ===
The Tigers compete in the Raccoon River Conference in the following sports:

==== Fall Sports ====
- Cross Country (boys and girls)
- Swimming (girls)
- Volleyball (girls)
  - 1972 State Champions
- Football

==== Winter Sports ====
- Basketball (boys and girls)
  - Girls' - 2-time Class 3A State Champions (1996, 1997)
- Wrestling (boys and girls)
- Swimming (boys)

==== Spring Sports ====
- Track and Field (boys and girls)
  - Boys' - 2-time State Champions (1927, 1957)
- Golf (boys and girls)
  - Girls' - 2009 Class 3A State Champions
- Tennis (boys and girls)
- Soccer (girls)
- Baseball
- Softball

=== Carroll High School Extracurriculars (A-Z) ===
- Fall Play: A play/musical is performed each year during the fall at CHS.
- FFA: The Carroll Area FFA Chapter is open to high school students in the surrounding school districts: Carroll Community School District, Kuemper Catholic Schools, and also Ar-we-va. The Carroll Area FFA Chapter was established in 1992.
- Jazz Band: CHS offers a jazz band for students grades 9–12, taking place in the 2nd semester of the year. The jazz band has performed at competitions in past years.
- Marching Band: The CHS Tiger Pride Marching Band is open to students in grades 9–12. The Carroll High School Marching Band performs at home football games, Carroll's annual band day parade, and also has made multiple appearances in multi-school competitions. In 2018 and 2019, the CHS band participated in the IHSMA Marching Band Competition.

== See also ==
- List of school districts in Iowa
- List of high schools in Iowa
