= Newton Township, Carroll County, Iowa =

Township in Iowa, US

Newton Township, Carroll County
- Township
- Coordinates: 41°54′30″N 094°47′57″W
- Country: United States
- State: Iowa
- County: Carroll

Government
  - Type: Board of Trustees
  - Trustee: David Danner
  - Trustee: John Hoffman
  - Trustee: Jeff Shirbroun
  - Clerk: Edith Hoffman

Area
  - Total: 35.62 sq mi (92.25 km^{2})
  - Land: 35.62 sq mi (92.25 km^{2})
  - Water: 0 sq mi (0 km^{2})
- Elevation: 1,293 ft (394 m)

Population (2000)
  - Total: 500
  - Density: 14/sq mi (5.4/km^{2})
- FIPS code: 19-93099
- GNIS feature ID: 0468438

Newton Township is one of eighteen townships in Carroll County, Iowa, United States. As of the 2000 census, its population was 500.

== Geography ==
Newton Township covers an area of 35.62 square miles (92.3 km^{2}) and contains one incorporated settlement, Dedham. According to the USGS, it contains three cemeteries: Dedham, McCurdy and Saint Josephs.
