= Union Township, Carroll County, Iowa =

Township in Iowa, US

Union Township, Carroll County
- Township
- Coordinates: 41°54′27″N 094°40′55″W
- Country: United States
- State: Iowa
- County: Carroll

Area
  - Total: 36.12 sq mi (93.56 km^{2})
  - Land: 36.12 sq mi (93.56 km^{2})
  - Water: 0 sq mi (0 km^{2})
- Elevation: 1,155 ft (352 m)

Population (2000)
  - Total: 1,532
  - Density: 42/sq mi (16.4/km^{2})
- FIPS code: 19-94182
- GNIS feature ID: 0468812

Union Township is one of eighteen townships in Carroll County, Iowa, USA. As of the 2000 census, its population was 1,532.

== Geography ==
Union Township covers an area of 36.12 square miles (93.6 km^{2}) and contains one incorporated settlement, Coon Rapids. According to the USGS, it contains four cemeteries: Coon Rapids, Oak Hill, Old Carrollton and Union.
