= Ewoldt Township, Carroll County, Iowa =

Township in Iowa, US

Ewoldt Township, Carroll County
- Township
- Coordinates: 41°54′21″N 095°01′53″W
- Country: United States
- State: Iowa
- County: Carroll

Area
  - Total: 33.78 sq mi (87.49 km^{2})
  - Land: 33.77 sq mi (87.47 km^{2})
  - Water: 0.0077 sq mi (0.02 km^{2})
- Elevation: 1,358 ft (414 m)

Population (2000)
  - Total: 282
  - Density: 8.3/sq mi (3.2/km^{2})
- FIPS code: 19-91254
- GNIS feature ID: 0467802

Ewoldt Township is one of eighteen townships in Carroll County, Iowa, United States. As of the 2000 census, its population was 282.

== Geography ==
Ewoldt Township covers an area of 33.78 square miles (87.5 km^{2}) and contains no incorporated settlements.
