= Carroll County Courthouse (Iowa) =

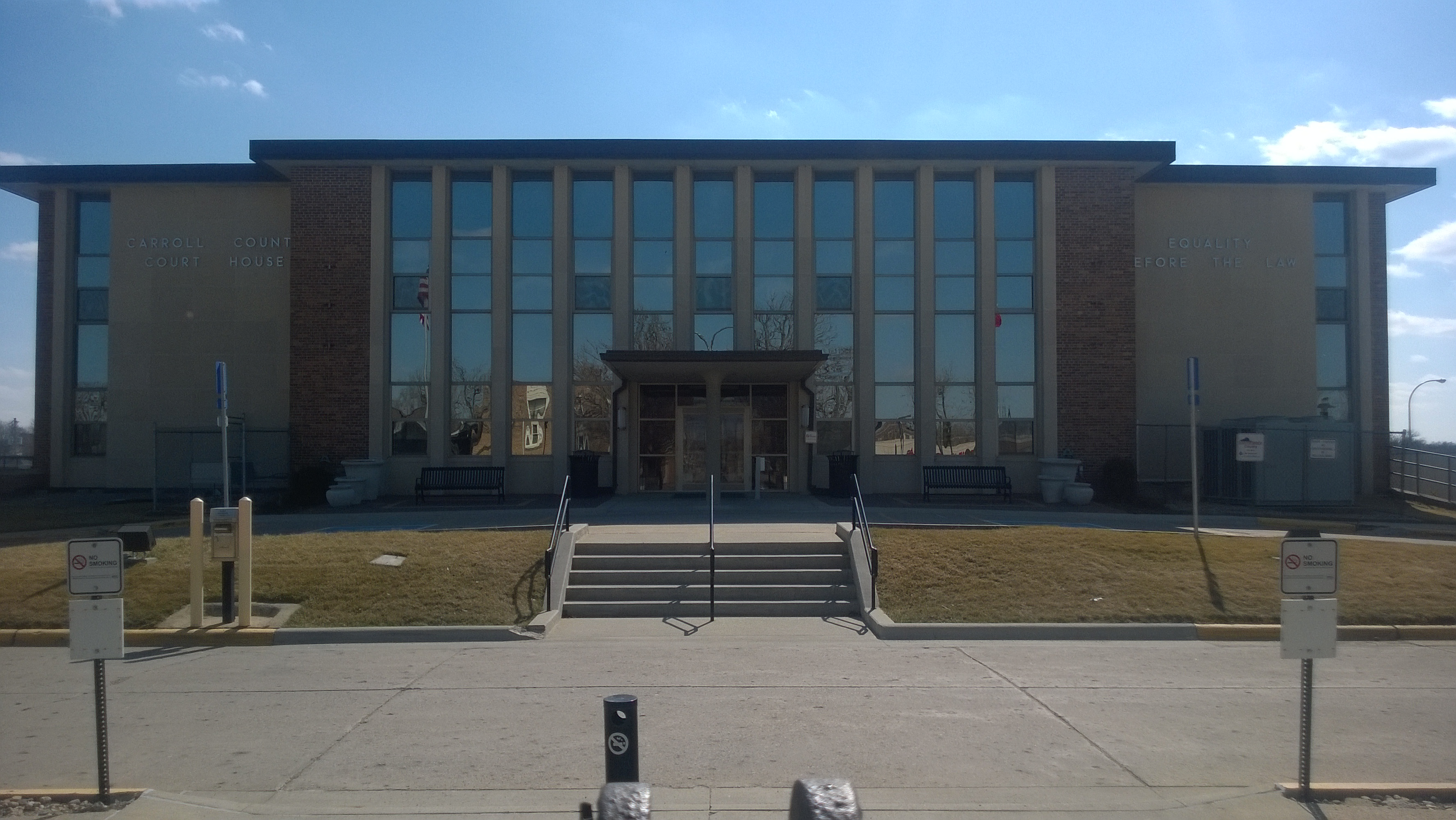
- Carroll County Courthouse
- Interactive map of the Carroll County Courthouse area

General information
- Type: Courthouse
- Architectural style: Modern
- Location: 114 E 6th St., Carroll, Iowa, United States
- Coordinates: 42.064679°N 94.866845°W
- Completed: 1965

Technical details
- Floor count: Three

The Carroll County Courthouse is located in Carroll, Iowa, United States. The current structure is the fourth courthouse to house court functions and county administration.

== History ==
The first county seat in Carroll County was the village of Carrollton. The courthouse there was begun in 1858 and required two contractors to complete it as the first died before the building was completed. A second story was added to the building in 1865. The county seat was moved to the city of Carroll in 1868 and a former railroad station was rented for county use. A $4,000 courthouse was built upon the square the railroad sold the county for a dollar in 1869. It was destroyed in a fire in the spring of 1886. In the interim, county offices were moved to the Joyce Lumber Company office building and court sessions were held in a music hall. A new Victorian courthouse was completed in 1887. The limestone building featured a cupola with a clock. The present three-story Modernist structure was completed in 1965 for $750,000. Its parking lot is the location of the old courthouse, which was torn down after the present building was completed.
