= Eden Township, Carroll County, Iowa =

Township in Iowa, US

Eden Township, Carroll County
- Township
- Coordinates: 41°54′24″N 094°54′49″W
- Country: United States
- State: Iowa
- County: Carroll

Area
  - Total: 36.22 sq mi (93.82 km^{2})
  - Land: 36.22 sq mi (93.82 km^{2})
  - Water: 0 sq mi (0 km^{2})
- Elevation: 1,467 ft (447 m)

Population (2000)
  - Total: 630
  - Density: 17/sq mi (6.7/km^{2})
- FIPS code: 19-91134
- GNIS feature ID: 0467761

Eden Township is one of eighteen townships in Carroll County, Iowa, United States. As of the 2000 census, its population was 630. Eden Township covers an area of 36.22 square miles (93.8 km^{2}) and contains one incorporated settlement, Templeton. According to the USGS, it contains two cemeteries: Elba and Sacred Heart. Employment rate of Eden Township is 71.1% with a median household income of $66,172 as of 2022.
