= Kniest Township, Carroll County, Iowa =

Township in Iowa, US

Kniest Township, Carroll County
- Township
- Coordinates: 42°09′59″N 094°54′47″W
- Country: United States
- State: Iowa
- County: Carroll

Area
  - Total: 35.68 sq mi (92.41 km^{2})
  - Land: 35.7 sq mi (92.4 km^{2})
  - Water: 0.0039 sq mi (0.01 km^{2})
- Elevation: 1,270 ft (387 m)

Population (2000)
  - Total: 441
  - Density: 12/sq mi (4.8/km^{2})
- FIPS code: 19-92319
- GNIS feature ID: 0468169

Kniest Township is one of eighteen townships in Carroll County, Iowa, USA. As of the 2000 census, its population was 441.

== Geography ==
Kniest Township covers an area of 35.68 square miles (92.4 km^{2}) and contains no incorporated settlements. According to the USGS, it contains two cemeteries: Our Lady of Mount Carmel and Saint Bernards.
