= Grant Township, Carroll County, Iowa =

Township in Iowa, US

Grant Township, Carroll County
- Township
- Coordinates: 42°04′41″N 094°47′44″W
- Country: United States
- State: Iowa
- County: Carroll

Area
  - Total: 33.89 sq mi (87.77 km^{2})
  - Land: 33.68 sq mi (87.24 km^{2})
  - Water: 0.21 sq mi (0.54 km^{2})
- Elevation: 1,250 ft (380 m)

Population (2000)
  - Total: 462
  - Density: 14/sq mi (5.3/km^{2})
- FIPS code: 19-91635
- GNIS feature ID: 0467932

Grant Township is one of eighteen townships in Carroll County, Iowa, USA. As of the 2000 census, its population was 462.

== Geography ==
Grant Township covers an area of 33.89 square miles (87.8 km^{2}) and contains no incorporated settlements. According to the USGS, it contains one cemetery, Holy Family.
