= Maple River Township, Carroll County, Iowa =

Township in Iowa, US

Maple River Township, Carroll County
- Township
- Coordinates: 42°04′49″N 094°55′15″W
- Country: United States
- State: Iowa
- County: Carroll

Area
  - Total: 32.95 sq mi (85.34 km^{2})
  - Land: 32.95 sq mi (85.34 km^{2})
  - Water: 0 sq mi (0 km^{2})
- Elevation: 1,260 ft (384 m)

Population (2000)
  - Total: 510
  - Density: 16/sq mi (6/km^{2})
- FIPS code: 19-92820
- GNIS feature ID: 0468342

Maple River Township is one of eighteen townships in Carroll County, Iowa, United States. As of the 2000 census, its population was 510.

== Geography ==
Maple River Township covers an area of 32.95 square miles (85.3 km^{2}) and contains no incorporated settlements. According to the USGS, it contains one cemetery, Saint Francis.
