= Glidden Township, Carroll County, Iowa =

Township in Iowa, US

Glidden Township, Carroll County
- Township
- Coordinates: 42°04′46″N 094°41′05″W
- Country: United States
- State: Iowa
- County: Carroll

Area
  - Total: 36.28 sq mi (93.96 km^{2})
  - Land: 36.24 sq mi (93.86 km^{2})
  - Water: 0.039 sq mi (0.1 km^{2})
- Elevation: 1,168 ft (356 m)

Population (2000)
  - Total: 1,589
  - Density: 44/sq mi (16.9/km^{2})
- FIPS code: 19-91581
- GNIS feature ID: 0467914

Glidden Township is one of eighteen townships in Carroll County, Iowa, United States. As of the 2000 census, its population was 1,589.

== Geography ==
Glidden Township covers an area of 36.28 square miles (94.0 km^{2}) and contains two incorporated settlements: Glidden and Ralston. According to the USGS, it contains two cemeteries: Dickson and West Lawn.
