= Kuemper Catholic School System =

Private secondary school in Carroll, Iowa, United States

Location
- St. Angela Center (grades 7-8 and HQ): 116 S. East Street; Holy Spirit Center (K-3): 201 S. Clark Street; St. Lawrence Center (4-6): 1519 N. West Street; High school & PK-K: 109 South Clark Street; Carroll, (Carroll County), Iowa 51401; United States; 42.059152°N 94.866375°W

Information
- Type: Private, Coeducational
- Motto: We provide a Christ-centered environment where students grow spiritually, academically, and socially, becoming responsible citizens of the world.
- Religious affiliation: Roman Catholic
- Established: 1909
- Founder: Joseph Kuemper
- Authority: Diocese of Sioux City
- President: John Steffes
- Principal: Ted Garringer
- Chaplain: Fr. Behm
- Grades: 9–12
- Hours in school day: 7
- Colors: Red and Gold
- Athletics conference: Hawkeye 10
- Mascot: Knight
- Team name: Knights
- Newspaper: The Charger
- Yearbook: The Lance
- Athletic Director: Chad Klein
- Website: www.kuemper.org

Kuemper Catholic School System is a private, Roman Catholic PK-12 school in Carroll, Iowa. It is located in the Roman Catholic Diocese of Sioux City. It includes the elementary/middle school division and Kuemper Catholic High School, held in four buildings.

== History ==
The roots of Kuemper Catholic School go all the way back to 1874 with the Mt. Carmel parish began a small pioneering Catholic school. By 1916, each of the 12 area parishes surrounding Carroll built their own Catholic grade school, and eventually Catholic high schools were also established in Breda, Mt. Carmel, Templeton, and Vail.

Fr. Joseph Kuemper (1855-1923) left his mark and an important legacy on Carroll county's 20th century history.

St. Bernard High School in Breda consolidated into Kuemper High in 1979.

The Christ the King School in Breda, along with the Holy Trinity Catholic grade school, consolidated into Kuemper Catholic System in 2003.

== Buildings ==
The main administrative headquarters of the Kuemper System are on the second floor of the St. Angela Center. The system has four buildings: Holy Spirit Center for kindergarten through grade 3, the third and fourth floors of St. Angela Center for grades 7 and 8, St. Lawrence Center for grades 4–6, and Kuemper High School for grades 9–12. Preschool and optional kindergarten classes are held in the Kuemper High building's first floor although the preschool/kindergarten administration is at Holy Spirit Center. Kuemper High and St. Angela Center are connected to one another.

Campuses in Carroll

== Athletics ==
The Knights compete within the Hawkeye 10 Conference and are part of the Iowa High School Athletic Association's class 2A in most sports.

=== Fall Sports ===
- Cross Country (boys and girls)
- Football
  - The Knights won the 2013 Class 2A football championship 31–28 over Waukon High School.
- Volleyball

=== Winter Sports ===
- Basketball (boys and girls)
- Bowling
- Wrestling

=== Spring Sports ===
- Golf (boys and girls)
- Soccer (boys and girls)
- Tennis (boys and girls)
- Track and Field (boys and girls)

=== Summer Sports ===
- Baseball
- Softball

== See also ==
- List of high schools in Iowa

== Notable alumni ==
- Brayton Alford (Class of 2026) - football player, linebacker for the University of Iowa Hawkeyes
- Gina Badding (Class of 1997) - Attorney, Judge on the Iowa Court of Appeals
- Sam Brincks (Class of 2014) - football player, defensive end for the University of Iowa Hawkeyes, 2014-2018
- Blaise Gunnerson (Class of 2020) - football player, defensive lineman for University of Nebraska Huskers
- Mary Lundby (Class of 1966) - Iowa State Senator
- Matthew McDermott (Class of 1996) - Attorney, Associate Justice of the Iowa Supreme Court
- Nick Nurse (Class of 1985) - Philadelphia 76ers head coach and 2019 NBA Champion
- Michael Romey (Class of 2007) - football player, place kicker for the Iowa State University Cyclones, 2008-2011
- Tom Slater (Class of 1963) - Iowa State Senator
- Robert Tiefenthaler (Class of 1988) - attorney, State of Iowa District Court Judge, 3rd Judicial District
- DJ Vonnahme (Class of 2024) - football player, tight end for the University of Iowa Hawkeyes
