= Washington Township, Carroll County, Iowa =

Township in Iowa, US

Washington Township, Carroll County
- Township
- Coordinates: 41°59′35″N 095°01′59″W
- Country: United States
- State: Iowa
- County: Carroll

Area
  - Total: 35.10 sq mi (90.92 km^{2})
  - Land: 35.10 sq mi (90.92 km^{2})
  - Water: 0 sq mi (0 km^{2})
- Elevation: 1,394 ft (425 m)

Population (2000)
  - Total: 308
  - Density: 8.8/sq mi (3.4/km^{2})
- FIPS code: 19-94467
- GNIS feature ID: 0468907

Washington Township is one of eighteen townships in Carroll County, Iowa, United States. As of the 2000 census, its population was 308.

== Geography ==
Washington Township covers an area of 35.1 square miles (91 km^{2}) and contains no incorporated settlements.
