= Richland Township, Carroll County, Iowa =

Township in Iowa, US

Richland Township, Carroll County
- Township
- Coordinates: 41°59′42″N 094°40′41″W
- Country: United States
- State: Iowa
- County: Carroll

Area
  - Total: 34.83 sq mi (90.21 km^{2})
  - Land: 34.81 sq mi (90.17 km^{2})
  - Water: 0.015 sq mi (0.04 km^{2})
- Elevation: 1,194 ft (364 m)

Population (2000)
  - Total: 187
  - Density: 5.4/sq mi (2.1/km^{2})
- FIPS code: 19-93573
- GNIS feature ID: 0468599

Richland Township is one of eighteen townships in Carroll County, Iowa, USA. As of the 2000 census, its population was 187.

== Geography ==
Richland Township covers an area of 34.83 square miles (90.2 km^{2}) and contains no incorporated settlements.
