= Halbur, Iowa =

- City
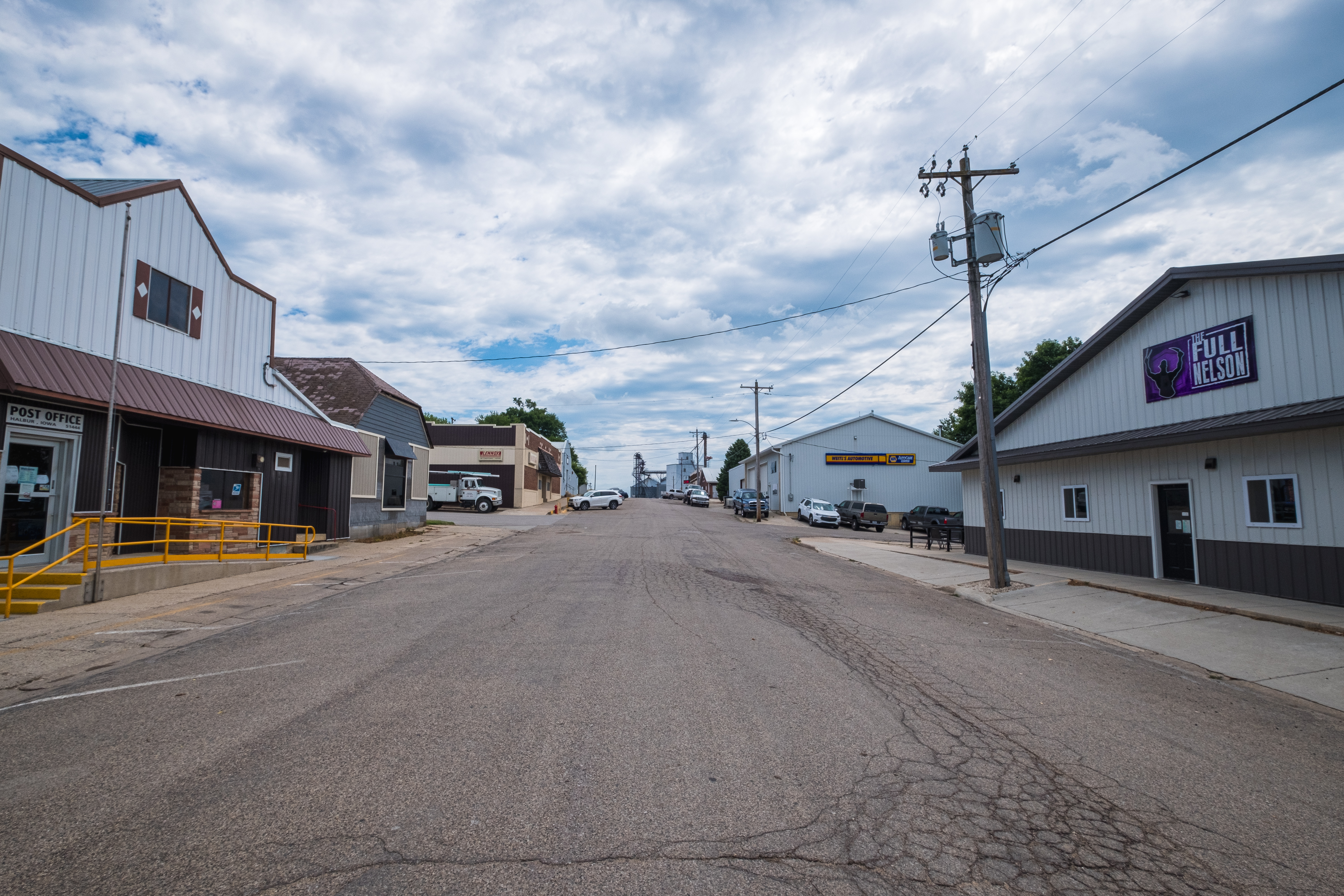
- Looking east on 2nd Street

- Location of Halbur, Iowa
- Coordinates: 42°0′10″N 94°58′25″W
- Country: US
- State: Iowa
- County: Carroll

Area
  - Total: 0.19 sq mi (0.48 km^{2})
  - Land: 0.19 sq mi (0.48 km^{2})
  - Water: 0 sq mi (0.00 km^{2})
- Elevation: 1,345 ft (410 m)

Population (2020)
  - Total: 243
  - Density: 1,313.3/sq mi (507.07/km^{2})
- Time zone: UTC-6 (Central (CST))
  - Summer (DST): UTC-5 (CDT)
- ZIP code: 51444
- Area code: 712
- FIPS code: 19-33645
- GNIS feature ID: 2394267
- Website: www.halburiowa.com

Halbur is a city in Carroll County, Iowa, United States. The population was 243 at the time of the 2020 census.

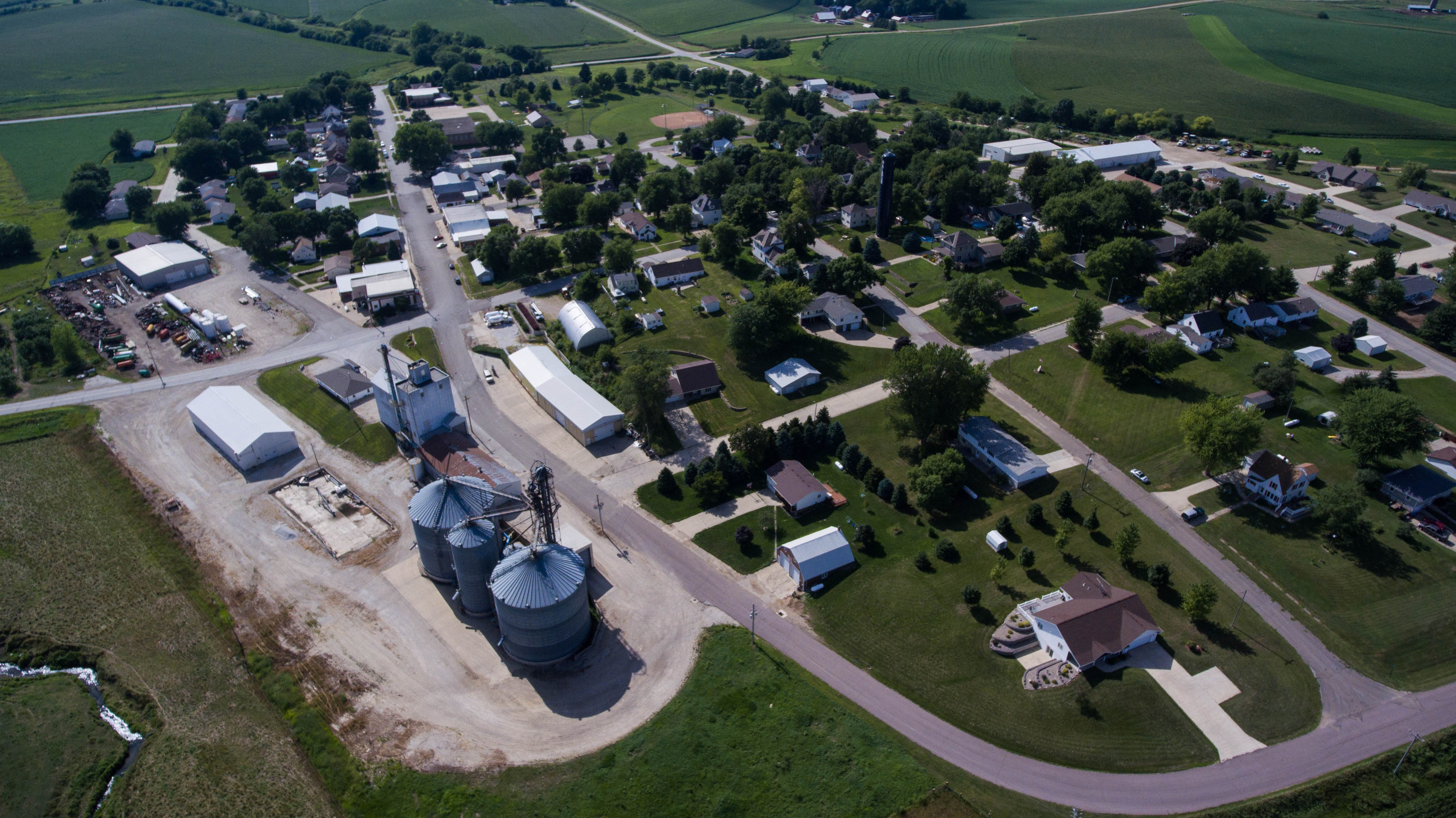
Halbur, IA Aerial View

== History ==
Halbur was platted in 1881. It was named for Anton Halbur, an original owner of the town site. A post office has been in operation in Halbur since 1882.

== Geography ==
According to the United States Census Bureau, the city has a total area of 0.20 square miles (0.52 km^{2}), all land.

== Demographics ==
Historical populations
Year	Pop.	±%
1910	147	—
1920	186	+26.5%
1930	192	+3.2%
1940	209	+8.9%
1950	235	+12.4%
1960	214	−8.9%
1970	235	+9.8%
1980	229	−2.6%
1990	215	−6.1%
2000	202	−6.0%
2010	246	+21.8%
2020	243	−1.2%
Source:"U.S. Census website". United States Census Bureau. and Iowa Data Center; Source: U.S. Decennial Census

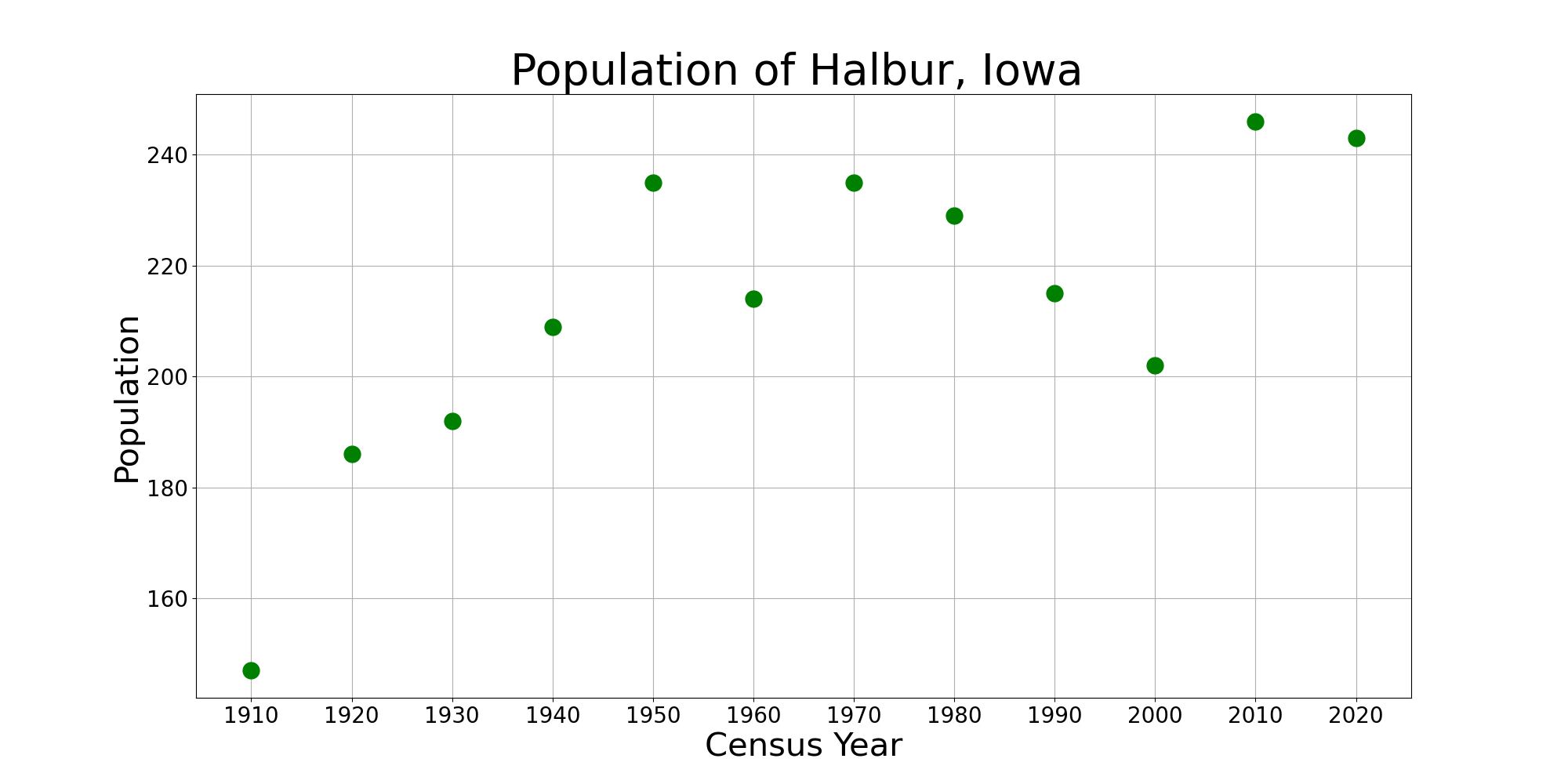
The population of Halbur, Iowa from US census data

=== 2020 census ===
As of the census of 2020, there were 243 people, 92 households, and 61 families residing in the city. The population density was 1,313.3 inhabitants per square mile (507.1/km^{2}). There were 95 housing units at an average density of 513.4 per square mile (198.2/km^{2}). The racial makeup of the city was 97.9% White, 0.4% Black or African American, 0.4% Native American, 0.0% Asian, 0.0% Pacific Islander, 0.0% from other races and 1.2% from two or more races. Hispanic or Latino persons of any race comprised 0.4% of the population.

Of the 92 households, 41.3% of which had children under the age of 18 living with them, 51.1% were married couples living together, 12.0% were cohabitating couples, 12.0% had a female householder with no spouse or partner present and 25.0% had a male householder with no spouse or partner present. 33.7% of all households were non-families. 21.7% of all households were made up of individuals, 10.9% had someone living alone who was 65 years old or older.

The median age in the city was 30.7 years. 30.9% of the residents were under the age of 20; 5.8% were between the ages of 20 and 24; 30.5% were from 25 and 44; 21.0% were from 45 and 64; and 11.9% were 65 years of age or older. The gender makeup of the city was 48.6% male and 51.4% female.

=== 2010 census ===
As of the census of 2010, there were 246 people, 94 households, and 67 families living in the city. The population density was 1,230.0 inhabitants per square mile (474.9/km^{2}). There were 98 housing units at an average density of 490.0 per square mile (189.2/km^{2}). The racial makeup of the city was 99.6% White and 0.4% from two or more races.

There were 94 households, of which 38.3% had children under the age of 18 living with them, 61.7% were married couples living together, 6.4% had a female householder with no husband present, 3.2% had a male householder with no wife present, and 28.7% were non-families. 25.5% of all households were made up of individuals, and 12.7% had someone living alone who was 65 years of age or older. The average household size was 2.62 and the average family size was 3.18.

The median age in the city was 35.4 years. 33.7% of residents were under the age of 18; 3.7% were between the ages of 18 and 24; 26.4% were from 25 to 44; 21.1% were from 45 to 64; and 15% were 65 years of age or older. The gender makeup of the city was 48.0% male and 52.0% female.

=== 2000 census ===
As of the census of 2000, there were 202 people, 85 households, and 52 families living in the city. The population density was 987.2 inhabitants per square mile (381.2/km^{2}). There were 87 housing units at an average density of 425.2 per square mile (164.2/km^{2}). The racial makeup of the city was 100.00% White.

There were 85 households, out of which 35.3% had children under the age of 18 living with them, 55.3% were married couples living together, 3.5% had a female householder with no husband present, and 38.8% were non-families. 35.3% of all households were made up of individuals, and 21.2% had someone living alone who was 65 years of age or older. The average household size was 2.38 and the average family size was 3.15.

In the city, the population was spread out, with 29.7% under the age of 18, 8.4% from 18 to 24, 30.7% from 25 to 44, 14.4% from 45 to 64, and 16.8% who were 65 years of age or older. The median age was 34 years. For every 100 females, there were 98.0 males. For every 100 females age 18 and over, there were 91.9 males.

The median income for a household in the city was $41,250, and the median income for a family was $45,625. Males had a median income of $33,750 versus $17,813 for females. The per capita income for the city was $16,896. About 4.1% of families and 4.1% of the population were below the poverty line, including 7.4% of those under the age of eighteen and 4.8% of those 65 or over.

== Education ==
The public school district is the Carroll Community School District.
