= Willey, Iowa =

- City
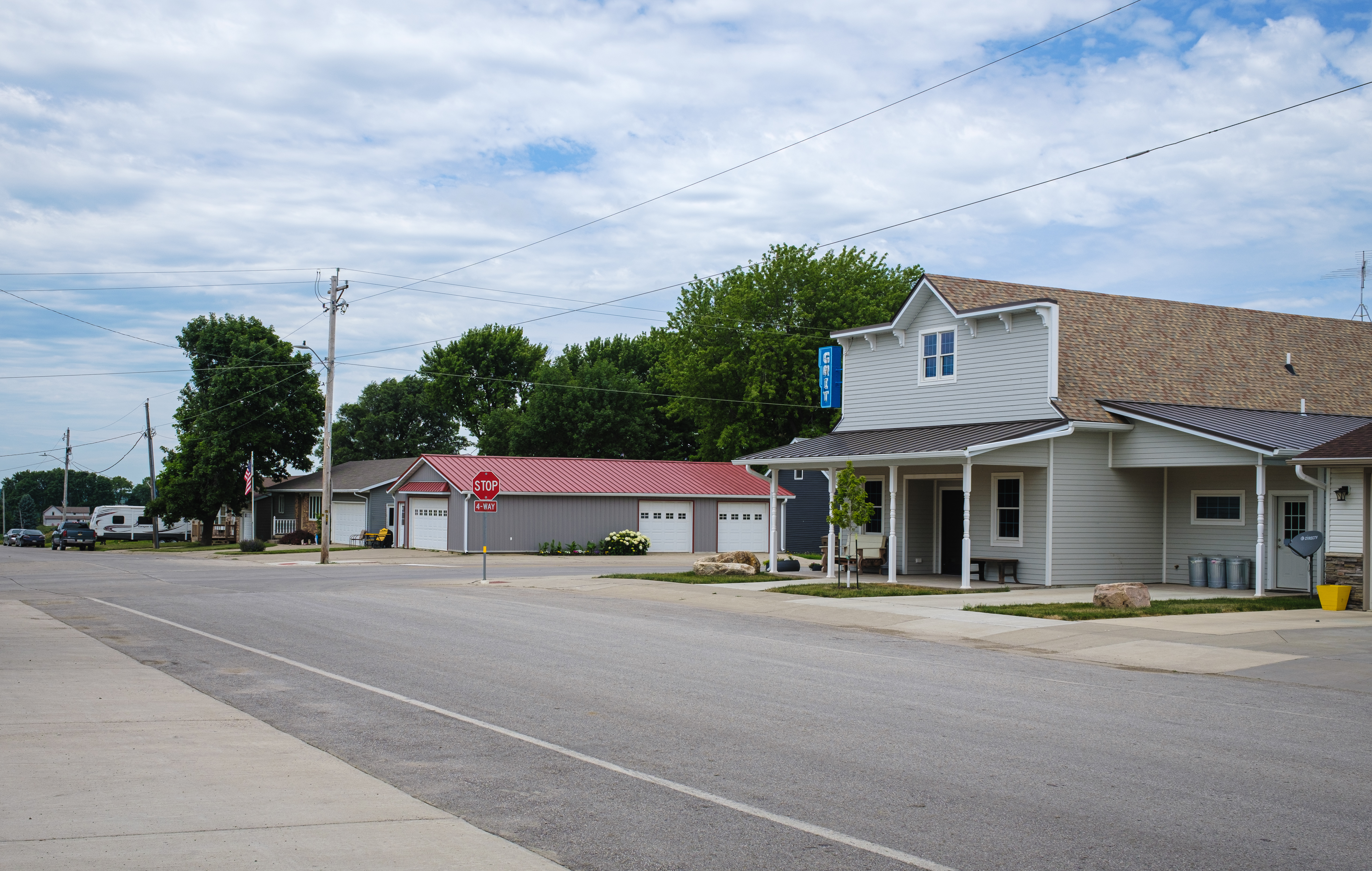
- Looking west on 260th Street

- Location of Willey, Iowa
- Coordinates: 41°58′44″N 94°49′21″W
- Country: USA
- State: Iowa
- County: Carroll

Area
  - Total: 0.25 sq mi (0.65 km^{2})
  - Land: 0.25 sq mi (0.65 km^{2})
  - Water: 0 sq mi (0.00 km^{2})
- Elevation: 1,348 ft (411 m)

Population (2020)
  - Total: 73
  - Density: 293.1/sq mi (113.18/km^{2})
- Time zone: UTC-6 (Central (CST))
  - Summer (DST): UTC-5 (CDT)
- ZIP code: 51401
- Area code: 712
- FIPS code: 19-85710
- GNIS feature ID: 2397315

Willey is a city in Carroll County, Iowa, United States. The population was 73 at the time of the 2020 census.

== Geography ==
According to the United States Census Bureau, the city has a total area of 0.25 square miles (0.65 km^{2}), all land.

== Demographics ==
Historical populations
Year	Pop.	±%
1920	176	—
1930	93	−47.2%
1940	86	−7.5%
1950	94	+9.3%
1960	80	−14.9%
1970	72	−10.0%
1980	94	+30.6%
1990	78	−17.0%
2000	103	+32.1%
2010	88	−14.6%
2020	73	−17.0%
Source:"U.S. Census website". United States Census Bureau. and Iowa Data Center; Source: U.S. Decennial Census

=== 2020 census ===
As of the census of 2020, there were 73 people, 29 households, and 26 families residing in the city. The population density was 293.1 inhabitants per square mile (113.2/km^{2}). There were 32 housing units at an average density of 128.5 per square mile (49.6/km^{2}). The racial makeup of the city was 95.9% White, 0.0% Black or African American, 0.0% Native American, 0.0% Asian, 0.0% Pacific Islander, 0.0% from other races and 4.1% from two or more races. Hispanic or Latino persons of any race comprised 1.4% of the population.

Of the 29 households, 34.5% of which had children under the age of 18 living with them, 75.9% were married couples living together, 6.9% were cohabitating couples, 10.3% had a female householder with no spouse or partner present and 6.9% had a male householder with no spouse or partner present. 10.3% of all households were non-families. 6.9% of all households were made up of individuals, 3.4% had someone living alone who was 65 years old or older.

The median age in the city was 49.8 years. 23.3% of the residents were under the age of 20; 2.7% were between the ages of 20 and 24; 21.9% were from 25 and 44; 27.4% were from 45 and 64; and 24.7% were 65 years of age or older. The gender makeup of the city was 52.1% male and 47.9% female.

=== 2010 census ===
As of the census of 2010, there were 88 people, 31 households, and 20 families living in the city. The population density was 352.0 inhabitants per square mile (135.9/km^{2}). There were 35 housing units at an average density of 140.0 units per square mile (54.1 units/km^{2}). The racial makeup of the city was 94.3% White and 5.7% from two or more races.

There were 31 households, of which 41.9% had children under the age of 18 living with them, 61.3% were married couples living together, 3.2% had a male householder with no wife present, and 35.5% were non-families. 32.3% of all households were made up of individuals, and 13% had someone living alone who was 65 years of age or older. The average household size was 2.84 and the average family size was 3.75.

The median age in the city was 32.5 years. 33% of residents were under the age of 18; 5.6% were between the ages of 18 and 24; 26% were from 25 to 44; 27.2% were from 45 to 64; and 8% were 65 years of age or older. The gender makeup of the city was 51.1% male and 48.9% female.

=== 2000 census ===
As of the census of 2000, there were 103 people, 32 households, and 24 families living in the city. The population density was 415.2 inhabitants per square mile (160.3/km^{2}). There were 33 housing units at an average density of 133.0 units per square mile (51.4 units/km^{2}). The racial makeup of the city was 100% White.

There were 32 households, out of which 50.0% had children under the age of 18 living with them, 65.6% were married couples living together, 3.1% had a female householder with no husband present, and 25.0% were non-families. 18.8% of all households were made up of individuals, and 6.3% had someone living alone who was 65 years of age or older. The average household size was 3.22, and the average family size was 3.79.

In the city, the population was spread out, with 37.9% under the age of 18, 4.9% from 18 to 24, 26.2% from 25 to 44, 24.3% from 45 to 64, and 6.8% who were 65 years of age or older. The median age was 32 years. For every 100 females, there were 110.2 males. For every 100 females age 18 and over, there were 137.0 males.

The median income for a household in the city was $42,083, and the median income for a family was $57,083. Males had a median income of $32,083 versus $14,286 for females. The per capita income for the city was $12,900. There were no families and 8.2% of the population living below the poverty line, including no under eighteens and none of those over 64.

== Education ==
The public school district is the Carroll Community School District.
