= Lidderdale, Iowa =

- City
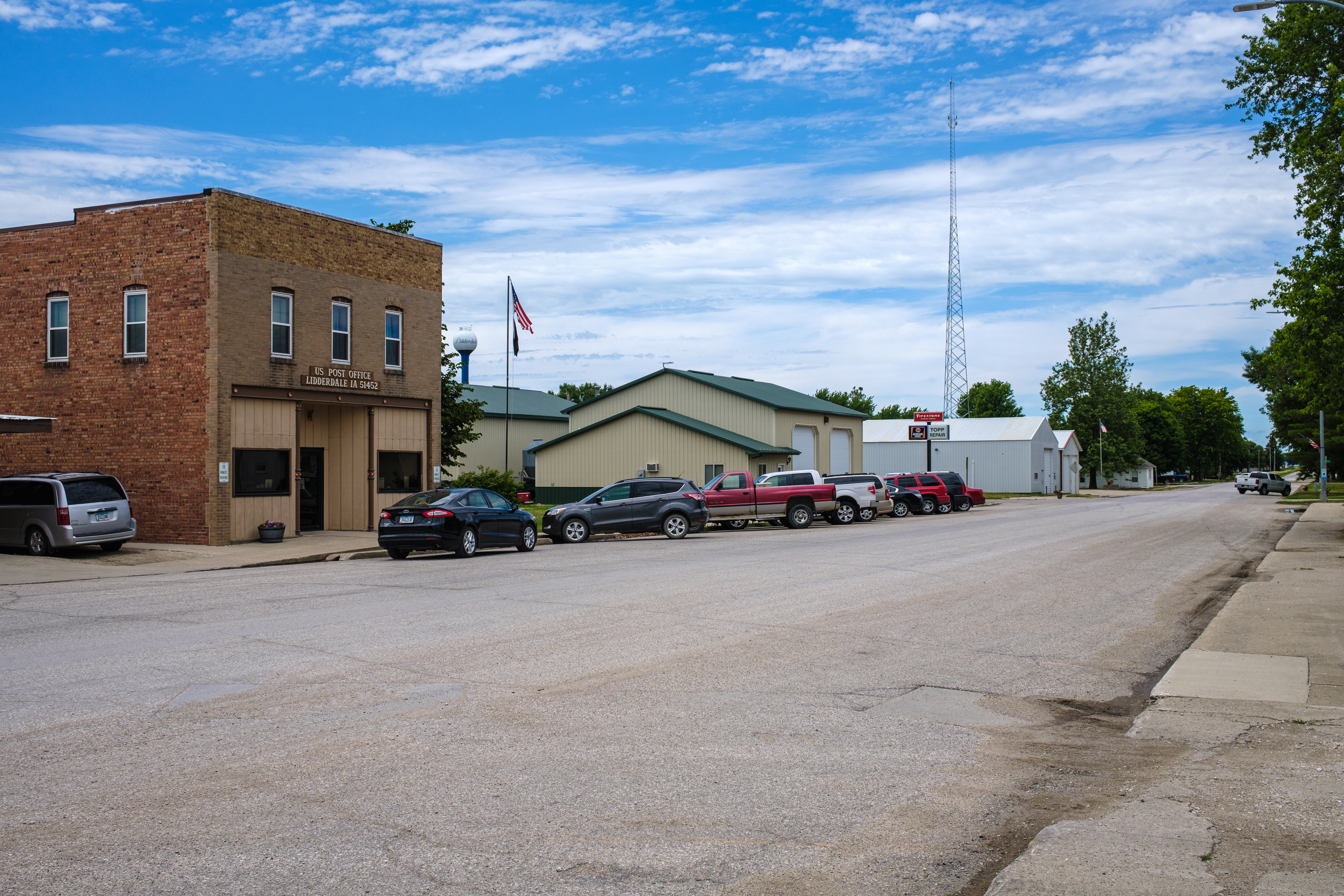
- Downtown Lidderdale

- Location of Lidderdale, Iowa
- Coordinates: 42°07′32″N 94°47′01″W
- Country: USA
- State: Iowa
- County: Carroll

Area
  - Total: 2.41 sq mi (6.25 km^{2})
  - Land: 2.41 sq mi (6.25 km^{2})
  - Water: 0 sq mi (0.00 km^{2})
- Elevation: 1,240 ft (380 m)

Population (2020)
  - Total: 166
  - Density: 68.8/sq mi (26.55/km^{2})
- Time zone: UTC-6 (Central (CST))
  - Summer (DST): UTC-5 (CDT)
- ZIP code: 51452
- Area code: 712
- FIPS code: 19-45030
- GNIS feature ID: 2395704

Lidderdale is a city in Carroll County, Iowa, United States. The population was 166 at the time of the 2020 census. It was incorporated in 1906.

== History ==
Lidderdale was a shipping point on the Chicago Great Western Railroad. The city was named for one William Lidderdale, a governor of the Bank of England and with his brother Francis Lidderdale, a major investor in the railway.

== Geography ==
According to the United States Census Bureau, the city has a total area of 2.42 square miles (6.27 km^{2}), all land.

== Demographics ==
Historical populations
Year	Pop.	±%
1910	114	—
1920	163	+43.0%
1930	211	+29.4%
1940	208	−1.4%
1950	180	−13.5%
1960	201	+11.7%
1970	173	−13.9%
1980	197	+13.9%
1990	202	+2.5%
2000	186	−7.9%
2010	180	−3.2%
2020	166	−7.8%
Source:"U.S. Census website". United States Census Bureau. and Iowa Data Center; Source: U.S. Decennial Census

=== 2020 census ===
As of the census of 2020, there were 166 people, 84 households, and 55 families residing in the city. The population density was 68.8 inhabitants per square mile (26.6/km^{2}). There were 84 housing units at an average density of 34.8 per square mile (13.4/km^{2}). The racial makeup of the city was 98.8% White, 0.0% Black or African American, 0.0% Native American, 0.6% Asian, 0.0% Pacific Islander, 0.0% from other races and 0.6% from two or more races. Hispanic or Latino persons of any race comprised 1.2% of the population.

Of the 84 households, 26.2% of which had children under the age of 18 living with them, 52.4% were married couples living together, 3.6% were cohabitating couples, 17.9% had a female householder with no spouse or partner present and 26.2% had a male householder with no spouse or partner present. 34.5% of all households were non-families. 31.0% of all households were made up of individuals, 7.1% had someone living alone who was 65 years old or older.

The median age in the city was 53.0 years. 22.3% of the residents were under the age of 20; 1.8% were between the ages of 20 and 24; 18.7% were from 25 and 44; 31.3% were from 45 and 64; and 25.9% were 65 years of age or older. The gender makeup of the city was 48.2% male and 51.8% female.

=== 2010 census ===
As of the census of 2010, there were 180 people, 80 households, and 50 families living in the city. The population density was 74.4 inhabitants per square mile (28.7/km^{2}). There were 88 housing units at an average density of 36.4 per square mile (14.1/km^{2}). The racial makeup of the city was 99.4% White and 0.6% Asian.

There were 80 households, of which 23.8% had children under the age of 18 living with them, 56.3% were married couples living together, 3.8% had a female householder with no husband present, 2.5% had a male householder with no wife present, and 37.5% were non-families. 30.0% of all households were made up of individuals, and 12.5% had someone living alone who was 65 years of age or older. The average household size was 2.25 and the average family size was 2.86.

The median age in the city was 46.5 years. 22.2% of residents were under the age of 18; 4% were between the ages of 18 and 24; 22.2% were from 25 to 44; 32.3% were from 45 to 64; and 19.4% were 65 years of age or older. The gender makeup of the city was 48.9% male and 51.1% female.

=== 2000 census ===
As of the census of 2000, there were 186 people, 81 households, and 52 families living in the city. The population density was 76.9 inhabitants per square mile (29.7/km^{2}). There were 87 housing units at an average density of 36.0 per square mile (13.9/km^{2}). The racial makeup of the city was 98.92% White, and 1.08% from two or more races.

There were 81 households, out of which 30.9% had children under the age of 18 living with them, 50.6% were married couples living together, 7.4% had a female householder with no husband present, and 35.8% were non-families. 30.9% of all households were made up of individuals, and 16.0% had someone living alone who was 65 years of age or older. The average household size was 2.30 and the average family size was 2.92.

In the city, the population was spread out, with 26.9% under the age of 18, 7.5% from 18 to 24, 25.3% from 25 to 44, 23.7% from 45 to 64, and 16.7% who were 65 years of age or older. The median age was 38 years. For every 100 females, there were 109.0 males. For every 100 females age 18 and over, there were 106.1 males.

The median income for a household in the city was $29,306, and the median income for a family was $29,722. Males had a median income of $23,056 versus $19,375 for females. The per capita income for the city was $13,513. None of the families and 2.9% of the population were living below the poverty line, including no under eighteens and 6.7% of those over 64.

== Education ==
The public school district is the Carroll Community School District.
