= Arcadia, Iowa =

- City
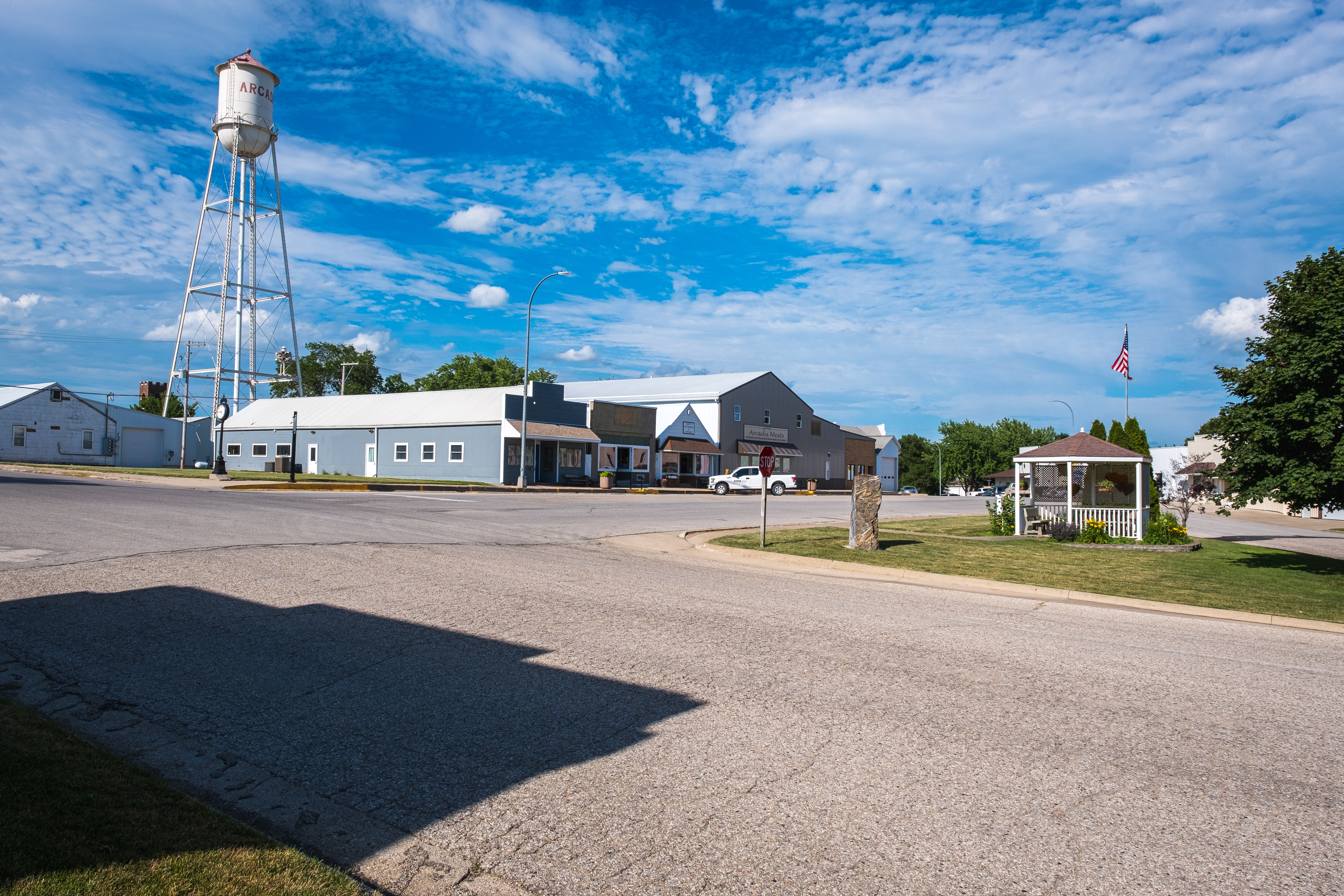
- Arcadia's Water Tower on Main Street

- Location of Arcadia, Iowa
- Coordinates: 42°05′10″N 95°02′36″W
- Country: USA
- State: Iowa
- County: Carroll

Area
  - Total: 0.99 sq mi (2.56 km^{2})
  - Land: 0.99 sq mi (2.56 km^{2})
  - Water: 0 sq mi (0.00 km^{2})
- Elevation: 1,411 ft (430 m)

Population (2020)
  - Total: 525
  - Density: 530.8/sq mi (204.93/km^{2})
- Time zone: UTC-6 (Central (CST))
  - Summer (DST): UTC-5 (CDT)
- ZIP code: 51430
- Area code: 712
- FIPS code: 19-02485
- GNIS feature ID: 2393972
- Website: www.cityofarcadiaiowa.org

Arcadia is a city in Carroll County, Iowa, United States. The population was 525 at the 2020 census.

== History ==
Arcadia was laid out in 1871. It was named for the region of Arcadia, in Greece. The date of incorporation of Arcadia was 1881. According of the census carried out in the year before, Arcadia had 450 inhabitants. The original name of the town was "Tip Top", chosen for its location on the Missouri-Mississippi Divide and it being Iowa's topographically most elevated town. In 1880, a large fire destroyed most of the business section of Arcadia. Only 2 buildings were spared by the fire. Most of the work for restoring the destroyed buildings was completed within a year after the event.

== Geography ==
According to the United States Census Bureau, the city has a total area of 0.98 square miles (2.54 km^{2}), all land.

== Demographics ==
Historical populations
Year	Pop.	±%
1880	426	—
1890	463	+8.7%
1900	405	−12.5%
1910	390	−3.7%
1920	375	−3.8%
1930	391	+4.3%
1940	410	+4.9%
1950	425	+3.7%
1960	437	+2.8%
1970	414	−5.3%
1980	454	+9.7%
1990	485	+6.8%
2000	443	−8.7%
2010	484	+9.3%
2020	525	+8.5%
Source:"U.S. Census website". United States Census Bureau. and Iowa Data Center; Source: U.S. Decennial Census

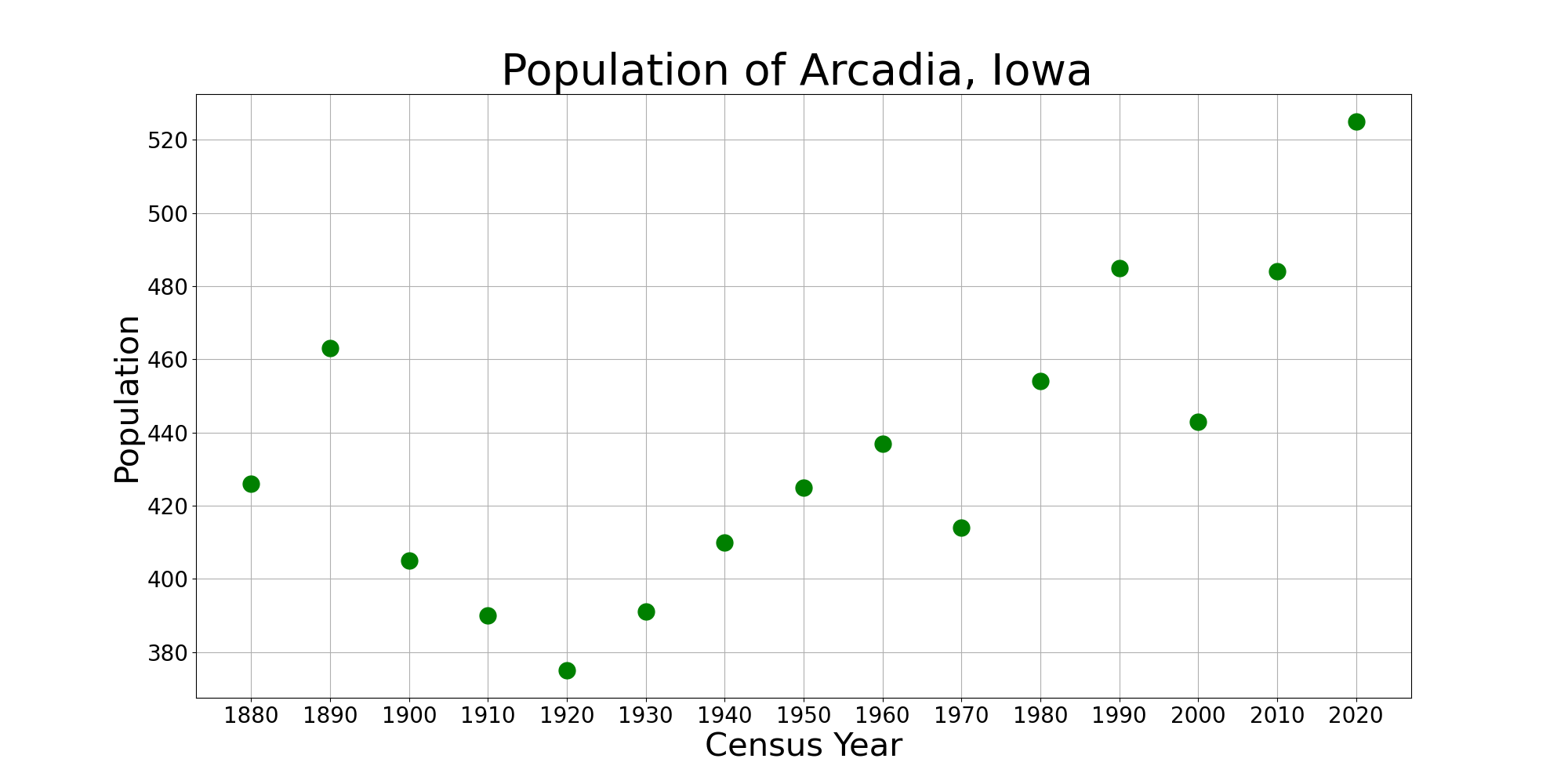
The population of Arcadia, Iowa from US census data

=== 2020 census ===
As of the census of 2020, there were 525 people, 203 households, and 144 families residing in the city. The population density was 530.8 inhabitants per square mile (204.9/km^{2}). There were 211 housing units at an average density of 213.3 per square mile (82.4/km^{2}). The racial makeup of the city was 96.0% White, 0.8% Black or African American, 0.4% Native American, 0.0% Asian, 0.0% Pacific Islander, 0.2% from other races and 2.7% from two or more races. Hispanic or Latino persons of any race comprised 1.0% of the population.

Of the 203 households, 36.0% of which had children under the age of 18 living with them, 58.1% were married couples living together, 5.4% were cohabitating couples, 21.2% had a female householder with no spouse or partner present and 15.3% had a male householder with no spouse or partner present. 29.1% of all households were non-families. 25.6% of all households were made up of individuals, 7.9% had someone living alone who was 65 years old or older.

The median age in the city was 33.8 years. 28.4% of the residents were under the age of 20; 7.2% were between the ages of 20 and 24; 26.5% were from 25 and 44; 22.7% were from 45 and 64; and 15.2% were 65 years of age or older. The gender makeup of the city was 50.9% male and 49.1% female.

=== 2010 census ===
As of the census of 2010, there were 484 people, 185 households, and 134 families residing in the city. The population density was 493.9 inhabitants per square mile (190.7/km^{2}). There were 195 housing units at an average density of 199.0 per square mile (76.8/km^{2}). The racial makeup of the city was 97.7% White, 0.4% Native American, 0.2% Asian, and 1.7% from two or more races. Hispanic or Latino of any race were 0.8% of the population.

There were 185 households, of which 36.8% had children under the age of 18 living with them, 61.6% were married couples living together, 9.2% had a female householder with no husband present, 1.6% had a male householder with no wife present, and 27.6% were non-families. 23.2% of all households were made up of individuals, and 14.1% had someone living alone who was 65 years of age or older. The average household size was 2.62 and the average family size was 3.13.

The median age in the city was 36.3 years. 29.8% of residents were under the age of 18; 6.6% were between the ages of 18 and 24; 24% were from 25 to 44; 23.3% were from 45 to 64; and 16.3% were 65 years of age or older. The gender makeup of the city was 51.2% male and 48.8% female.

=== 2000 census ===
As of the census of 2000, there were 443 people, 172 households, and 125 families residing in the city. The population density was 453.2 inhabitants per square mile (175.0/km^{2}). There were 183 housing units at an average density of 187.2 per square mile (72.3/km^{2}). The racial makeup of the city was 99.55% White and 0.45% Asian. Hispanic or Latino of any race were 0.23% of the population.

There were 172 households, out of which 33.7% had children under the age of 18 living with them, 65.7% were married couples living together, 4.7% had a female householder with no husband present, and 27.3% were non-families. 25.6% of all households were made up of individuals, and 17.4% had someone living alone who was 65 years of age or older. The average household size was 2.58 and the average family size was 3.11.

In the city, the population was spread out, with 27.5% under the age of 18, 8.6% from 18 to 24, 26.4% from 25 to 44, 15.8% from 45 to 64, and 21.7% who were 65 years of age or older. The median age was 38 years. For every 100 females, there were 113.0 males. For every 100 females age 18 and over, there were 96.9 males.

The median income for a household in the city was $34,063, and the median income for a family was $45,278. Males had a median income of $28,636 versus $18,750 for females. The per capita income for the city was $16,584. About 2.7% of families and 6.1% of the population were below the poverty line, including 9.3% of those under age 18 and 6.2% of those age 65 or over.

== Education ==
The Ar-We-Va Community School District operates local area schools.
