= Breda, Iowa =

- City
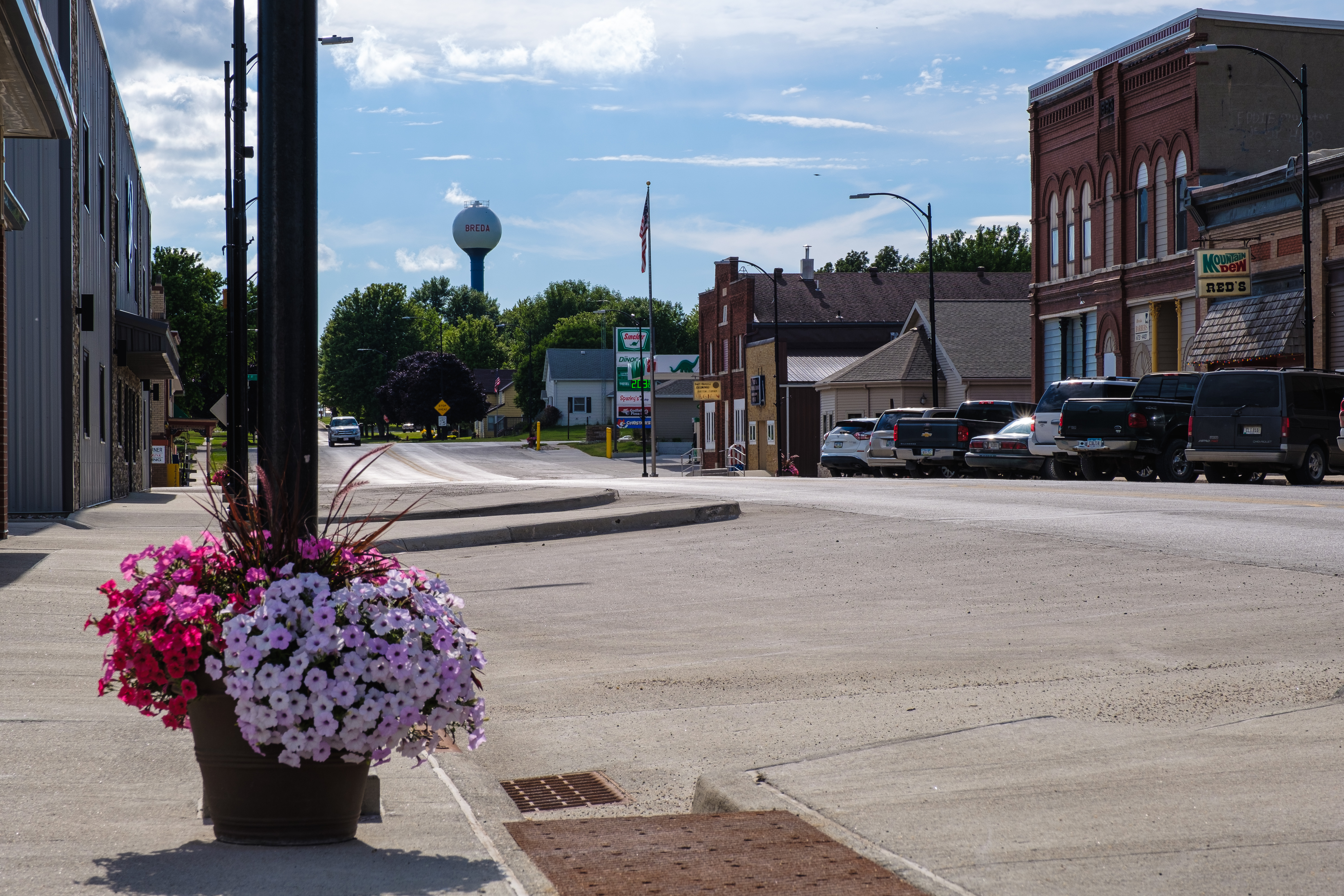
- Main Street

- Location within Iowa Location within the United States
- Coordinates: 42°11′02″N 94°58′30″W
- Country: USA
- State: Iowa
- County: Carroll County

Area
  - Total: 0.74 sq mi (1.92 km^{2})
  - Land: 0.74 sq mi (1.92 km^{2})
  - Water: 0 sq mi (0.00 km^{2})
- Elevation: 1,362 ft (415 m)

Population (2020)
  - Total: 500
  - Density: 676.2/sq mi (261.08/km^{2})
- Time zone: UTC-6 (Central (CST))
  - Summer (DST): UTC-5 (CDT)
- ZIP code: 51436
- Area code: 712
- FIPS code: 19-08290
- GNIS feature ID: 2393408
- Website: www.citybreda.com

Breda is a city in Carroll County, Iowa, United States. The population was 500 at the 2020 census.

== History ==
Breda got its start in the year 1877, following construction of the Maple branch of the Chicago and North Western railroad through that territory. It was named after the Dutch city of Breda by a settler native to that place.

== Geography ==
According to the United States Census Bureau, the city has a total area of 0.74 square miles (1.92 km^{2}), all land.

== Demographics ==
Historical population
Year	Pop.	±%
1880	109	—
1890	256	+134.9%
1900	395	+54.3%
1910	374	−5.3%
1920	419	+12.0%
1930	481	+14.8%
1940	532	+10.6%
1950	506	−4.9%
1960	543	+7.3%
1970	518	−4.6%
1980	502	−3.1%
1990	467	−7.0%
2000	477	+2.1%
2010	483	+1.3%
2020	500	+3.5%
Source:"U.S. Census website". United States Census Bureau. and Iowa Data Center; Source: U.S. Decennial Census

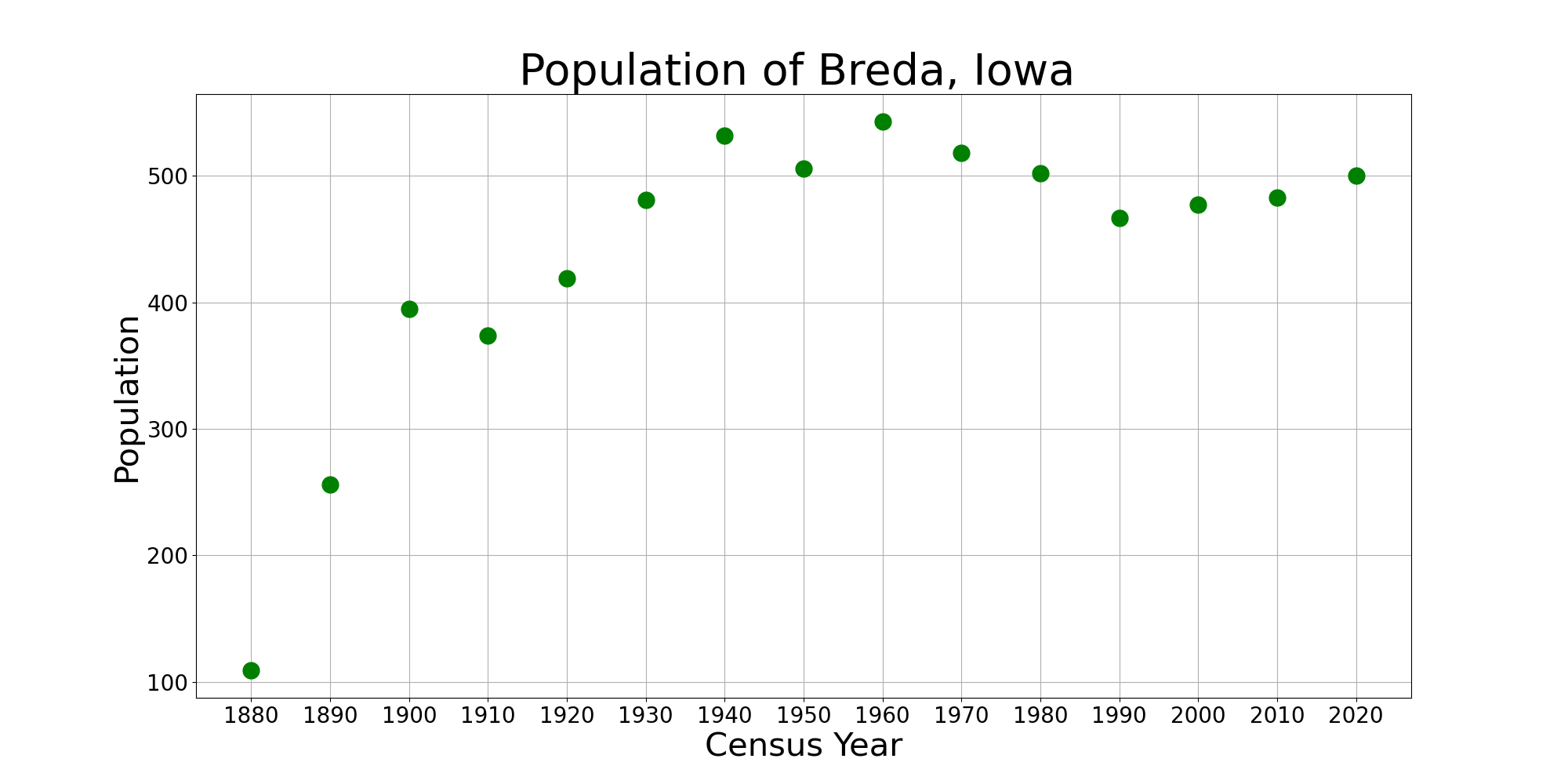
The population of Breda, Iowa from US census data

=== 2020 census ===
As of the census of 2020, there were 500 people, 214 households, and 140 families residing in the city. The population density was 676.2 inhabitants per square mile (261.1/km^{2}). There were 234 housing units at an average density of 316.5 per square mile (122.2/km^{2}). The racial makeup of the city was 97.6% White, 0.0% Black or African American, 0.0% Native American, 0.2% Asian, 0.0% Pacific Islander, 0.2% from other races and 2.0% from two or more races. Hispanic or Latino persons of any race comprised 1.0% of the population.

Of the 214 households, 28.0% of which had children under the age of 18 living with them, 54.7% were married couples living together, 5.1% were cohabitating couples, 18.2% had a female householder with no spouse or partner present and 22.0% had a male householder with no spouse or partner present. 34.6% of all households were non-families. 29.4% of all households were made up of individuals, 11.7% had someone living alone who was 65 years old or older.

The median age in the city was 36.0 years. 26.4% of the residents were under the age of 20; 3.6% were between the ages of 20 and 24; 30.6% were from 25 and 44; 25.0% were from 45 and 64; and 14.4% were 65 years of age or older. The gender makeup of the city was 53.8% male and 46.2% female.

=== 2010 census ===
As of the census of 2010, there were 483 people, 211 households, and 135 families residing in the city. The population density was 652.7 inhabitants per square mile (252.0/km^{2}). There were 226 housing units at an average density of 305.4 per square mile (117.9/km^{2}). The racial makeup of the city was 98.8% White, 0.4% African American, 0.2% Asian, and 0.6% from two or more races.

There were 211 households, of which 32.7% had children under the age of 18 living with them, 53.1% were married couples living together, 5.7% had a female householder with no husband present, 5.2% had a male householder with no wife present, and 36.0% were non-families. 32.2% of all households were made up of individuals, and 15.7% had someone living alone who was 65 years of age or older. The average household size was 2.29 and the average family size was 2.90.

The median age in the city was 37.6 years. 25.3% of residents were under the age of 18; 7% were between the ages of 18 and 24; 27.3% were from 25 to 44; 23.6% were from 45 to 64; and 16.8% were 65 years of age or older. The gender makeup of the city was 50.5% male and 49.5% female.

=== 2000 census ===
As of the census of 2000, there were 477 people, 210 households, and 129 families residing in the city. The population density was 998.4 inhabitants per square mile (385.5/km^{2}). There were 222 housing units at an average density of 464.7 per square mile (179.4/km^{2}). The racial makeup of the city was 99.16% White, 0.42% African American, 0.21% Native American and 0.21% Asian. Hispanic or Latino of any race were 0.63% of the population.

There were 210 households, out of which 26.2% had children under the age of 18 living with them, 53.8% were married couples living together, 5.2% had a female householder with no husband present, and 38.1% were non-families. 35.2% of all households were made up of individuals, and 22.9% had someone living alone who was 65 years of age or older. The average household size was 2.27 and the average family size was 2.97.

In the city, the population was spread out, with 24.7% under the age of 18, 6.1% from 18 to 24, 22.9% from 25 to 44, 19.1% from 45 to 64, and 27.3% who were 65 years of age or older. The median age was 42 years. For every 100 females, there were 104.7 males. For every 100 females age 18 and over, there were 99.4 males.

The median income for a household in the city was $29,783, and the median income for a family was $41,458. Males had a median income of $26,111 versus $19,375 for females. The per capita income for the city was $17,461. About 3.6% of families and 6.9% of the population were below the poverty line, including 7.1% of those under age 18 and 10.9% of those age 65 or over.

== Education ==
The public school district is the Carroll Community School District, which operates schools in Carroll. The area Catholic school is the Kuemper Catholic School System, which is also in Carroll.

Previously Breda had its own Catholic schools, with the first such institution opening in 1884. St. Bernard Grade School opened in 1903, and St. Bernard High School opened in the St. Bernard building in 1927. The high school received its own building in 1951. St. Bernard High consolidated into Kuemper Catholic High in 1979. St. Bernard Elementary occupied the former high school building while the former elementary building closed that year; that building was demolished in 1980, and by 2014 two houses had been built in its place. Christ the King School formed in 1983 as a merger of St. Bernard along with Mount Carmel, Lidderdale and Maple River Catholic schools. The Christ the King School, along with the Holy Trinity Catholic grade school, consolidated into Kuemper Catholic System in 2003.

St. Bernard Church became the owner of the former St. Bernard High/new St. Bernard Grade School/Christ the King School. The estate of Mary Nieland funded a renovation of the former cafeteria. This became the Mary Nieland Center, a community center, and as of 2014 other sections of the former school are used for other community and recreation functions.
