= Dedham, Iowa =

- City
- Location of Dedham, Iowa
- Coordinates: 41°54′30″N 94°49′24″W
- Country: US
- State: Iowa
- County: Carroll
- Established: 1883

Area
  - Total: 0.55 sq mi (1.43 km^{2})
  - Land: 0.55 sq mi (1.43 km^{2})
  - Water: 0 sq mi (0.00 km^{2})
- Elevation: 1,270 ft (390 m)

Population (2020)
  - Total: 224
  - Density: 405.5/sq mi (156.55/km^{2})
- Time zone: UTC-6 (Central (CST))
  - Summer (DST): UTC-5 (CDT)
- ZIP code: 51440
- Area code: 712
- FIPS code: 19-19450
- GNIS feature ID: 2394484

Dedham is a city in Carroll County, Iowa, United States. The population was 224 at the time of the 2020 census.

== History ==
Dedham got its start in the year 1881, following construction of the Chicago, Milwaukee and St. Paul Railway through that territory. It was named for Dedham, Massachusetts.

St. Joseph Parish was founded in 1891 by German and English Catholics. They built the first church in 1892 with a new, larger church coming in 1904. The present church was dedicated on October 1, 1940, by Bishop Edmond Heelan.

== Geography ==
Dedham is located at the junction of Brushy and Dedham Creeks.

According to the United States Census Bureau, the city has a total area of 0.58 square miles (1.50 km^{2}), all land.

== Government and politics ==
Dedham operates under a mayor-council government. The Mayor is Robert Sporrer. Along with the mayor is the five person city council. Council members are:[ Christopher John Hoffman, Mike Heinrichs, Rod Smith, Tony Derner, and Tony Seidl. The City Clerk is Heather Badding. City elections are held every two odd numbered years. The mayor serves a two-year term, while the members of the council serve four-year terms.

Mayor and city council
Name	Years serving	First elected	Notes
Robert Sporrer	2018–present	2017	Eligible for re-election in 2019
Mike Heinrichs	2008–Present	2007	Eligible for re-election in 2019
Tony Derner	2015–Present	2017	Eligible for re-election in 2021
Chris Hoffman	2018–Present	2017	Eligible for re-election in 2021
Rod Smith	2016–Present	2015	Eligible for re-election in 2019
Tony Seidl	2013–?	2013	Eligible for re-election in 2021

== Past mayors ==
No.	Name	Years	Length of term	Notes
1	Charles Shefford	1883	1 year	Resigned; was a federal officer
2	W. A. Lytton	1883-1884	2 years	
3	J. A. Edgett	1884-1885	2 years	
4	N. B. Coder	1885-1886	2 years	
5	J. A. Edgett	1886-1887	2 years	Second mayorship
6	John W. Niman	1887-1888	2 years	
7	J. A. Edgett	1888-1889	2 years	Third mayorship
8	J. A. Horton	1889-1890	2 years	
9	A. W. Basom	1890-1892	3 years	
10	J. A. Edgett	1893-1897	5 years	Fourth mayorship
11	J. G. Caton	1897-1898	2 years	
12	J. A. Edgett	1898-1900	2 years	Fifth mayorship
13	Fred A. Toovey	1900-1910	10 years	
14	M. Slife	1910-1911	1 year	
15	Fred A. Toovey	1911-1922	11 years	Second mayorship
16	Reed McMurray	1922-1924	2 years	
17	A. J. Ayrhart	1924-1926	2 years	
18	H. E. Qualheim	1926-1927	1 year	
19	J. J. Klingseis	1927-1932	5 years	
20	L. W. Chain	1932-1934	2 years	
21	Fred A. Toovey	1934-1936	2 years	Third mayorship
22	F. F. Schreck	1936-1940	4 years	
23	Ben Roderick	1940-1942	3 years	
24	Fred A. Toovey	1943-1945	2 years	Fourth mayorship
25	J. T. Stangl	1945-1948	3 years	
26	Norbert Koester	1948-1953	5 years	City elections were moved from even numbered years to odd numbered years (1951)
27	Ed Soppe	1954-1963	10 years	
28	John Werner	1964-1965	2 years	
29	Merlin Nair	1966-1969	4 years	
30	Herman Hathcock	1970-1973	4 years	
31	Merlin Nair	1974-December 31, 1975	2 years	Second mayorship
32	Clarence J. Rothmeyer	January 1, 1976 – May 1, 1992	16 years	Resigned due to health issues
33	Russell W. Axman	May 1, 1992 – December 31, 2017	26 years	Longest-serving mayor in Dedham history
34	Robert Sporrer	January 1, 2018 – September 14, 2021	3 Years, 8 Months	
35	Thomas L. Seidl	January 1, 2022 – ?		

== Demographics ==
Historical populations
Year	Pop.	±%
1890	273	—
1900	374	+37.0%
1910	355	−5.1%
1920	360	+1.4%
1930	327	−9.2%
1940	392	+19.9%
1950	360	−8.2%
1960	322	−10.6%
1970	325	+0.9%
1980	321	−1.2%
1990	264	−17.8%
2000	280	+6.1%
2010	266	−5.0%
2020	224	−15.8%
Source:"U.S. Census website". United States Census Bureau. and Iowa Data Center; Source: U.S. Decennial Census

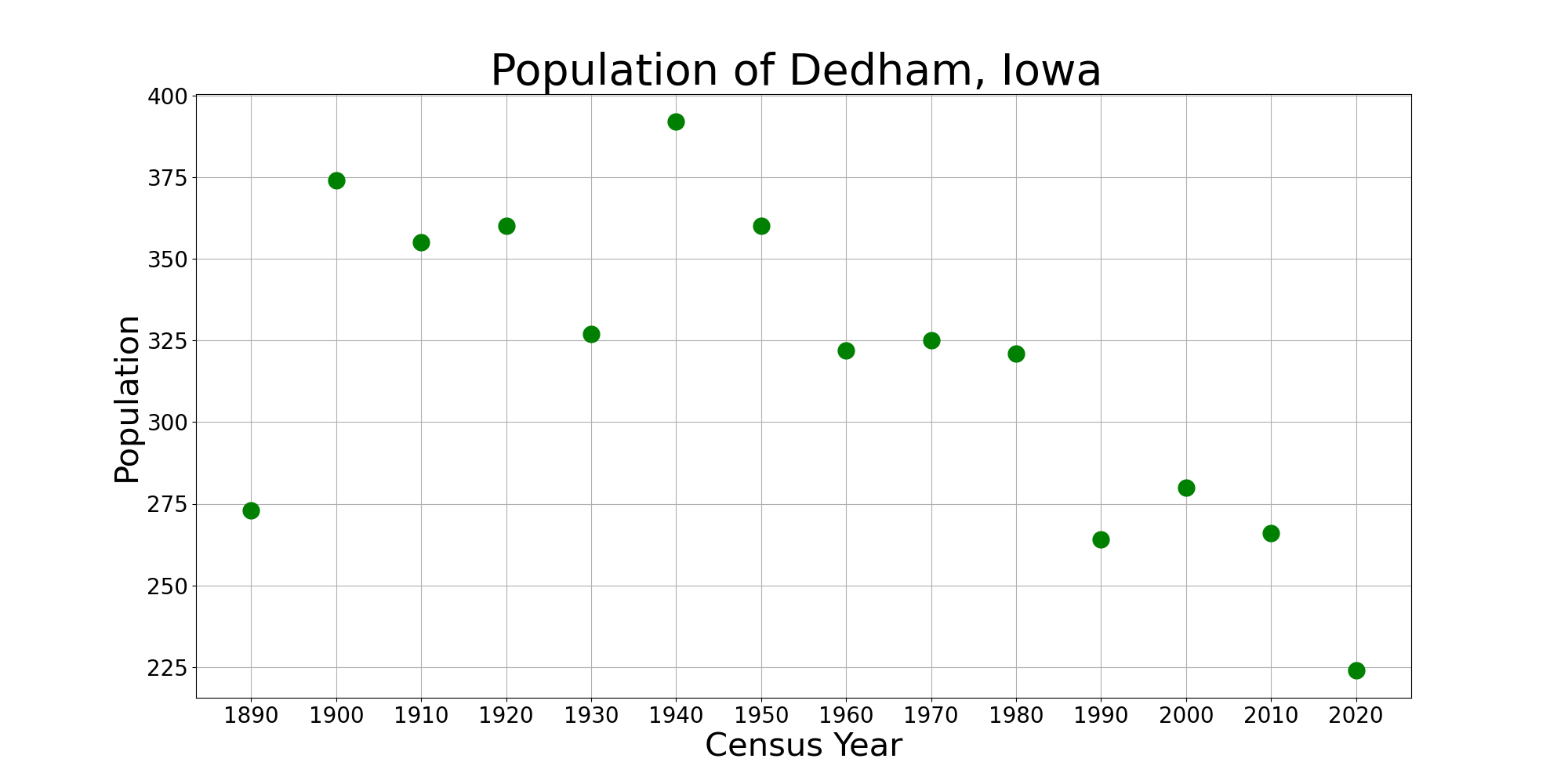
The population of Dedham, Iowa from US census data

=== 2020 census ===
As of the census of 2020, there were 224 people, 83 households, and 56 families residing in the city. The population density was 405.5 inhabitants per square mile (156.5/km^{2}). There were 100 housing units at an average density of 181.0 per square mile (69.9/km^{2}). The racial makeup of the city was 99.1% White, 0.0% Black or African American, 0.0% Native American, 0.0% Asian, 0.0% Pacific Islander, 0.0% from other races and 0.9% from two or more races. Hispanic or Latino persons of any race comprised 0.0% of the population.

Of the 83 households, 41.0% of which had children under the age of 18 living with them, 53.0% were married couples living together, 6.0% were cohabitating couples, 19.3% had a female householder with no spouse or partner present and 21.7% had a male householder with no spouse or partner present. 32.5% of all households were non-families. 24.1% of all households were made up of individuals, 10.8% had someone living alone who was 65 years old or older.

The median age in the city was 32.0 years. 33.5% of the residents were under the age of 20; 4.9% were between the ages of 20 and 24; 29.5% were from 25 and 44; 16.1% were from 45 and 64; and 16.1% were 65 years of age or older. The gender makeup of the city was 50.0% male and 50.0% female.

=== 2010 census ===
As of the census of 2010, there were 266 people, 101 households, and 65 families residing in the city. The population density was 458.6 inhabitants per square mile (177.1/km^{2}). There were 107 housing units at an average density of 184.5 per square mile (71.2/km^{2}). The racial makeup of the city was 100.0% White. Hispanic or Latino of any race were 0.4% of the population.

There were 101 households, of which 36.6% had children under the age of 18 living with them, 55.4% were married couples living together, 5.0% had a female householder with no husband present, 4.0% had a male householder with no wife present, and 35.6% were non-families. 30.7% of all households were made up of individuals, and 14.8% had someone living alone who was 65 years of age or older. The average household size was 2.63 and the average family size was 3.32.

The median age in the city was 32.3 years. 29.7% of residents were under the age of 18; 9.1% were between the ages of 18 and 24; 24.4% were from 25 to 44; 21.4% were from 45 to 64; and 15.4% were 65 years of age or older. The gender makeup of the city was 48.5% male and 51.5% female.

=== 2000 census ===
As of the census of 2000, there were 270 people, 112 households, and 68 families residing in the city. The population density was 483.5 inhabitants per square mile (186.7/km^{2}). There were 117 housing units at an average density of 202.1 per square mile (78.0/km^{2}). The racial makeup of the city was 100.00% White. Hispanic or Latino of any race were 1.07% of the population.

There were 113 households, out of which 31.9% had children under the age of 18 living with them, 51.3% were married couples living together, 7.1% had a female householder with no husband present, and 38.9% were non-families. 36.3% of all households were made up of individuals, and 19.5% had someone living alone who was 65 years of age or older. The average household size was 2.48 and the average family size was 3.23.

In the city, the population was spread out, with 28.2% under the age of 18, 8.2% from 18 to 24, 24.6% from 25 to 44, 18.6% from 45 to 64, and 20.4% who were 65 years of age or older. The median age was 36 years. For every 100 females, there were 105.9 males. For every 100 females age 18 and over, there were 103.0 males.

The median income for a household in the city was $33,125, and the median income for a family was $37,639. Males had a median income of $25,000 versus $15,417 for females. The per capita income for the city was $13,505. About 7.9% of families and 9.9% of the population were below the poverty line, including 15.3% of those under the age of eighteen and 9.4% of those 65 or over.

== Education ==
The public school district is the Carroll Community School District.

== Works cited ==
- Maclean, Paul (1912). History of Carroll County, Iowa: A Record of Settlement, Organization, Progress and Achievement, Volume 1. S. J. Clarke Publishing Company.
