= Carroll County, Iowa =

County in Iowa, United States

- County
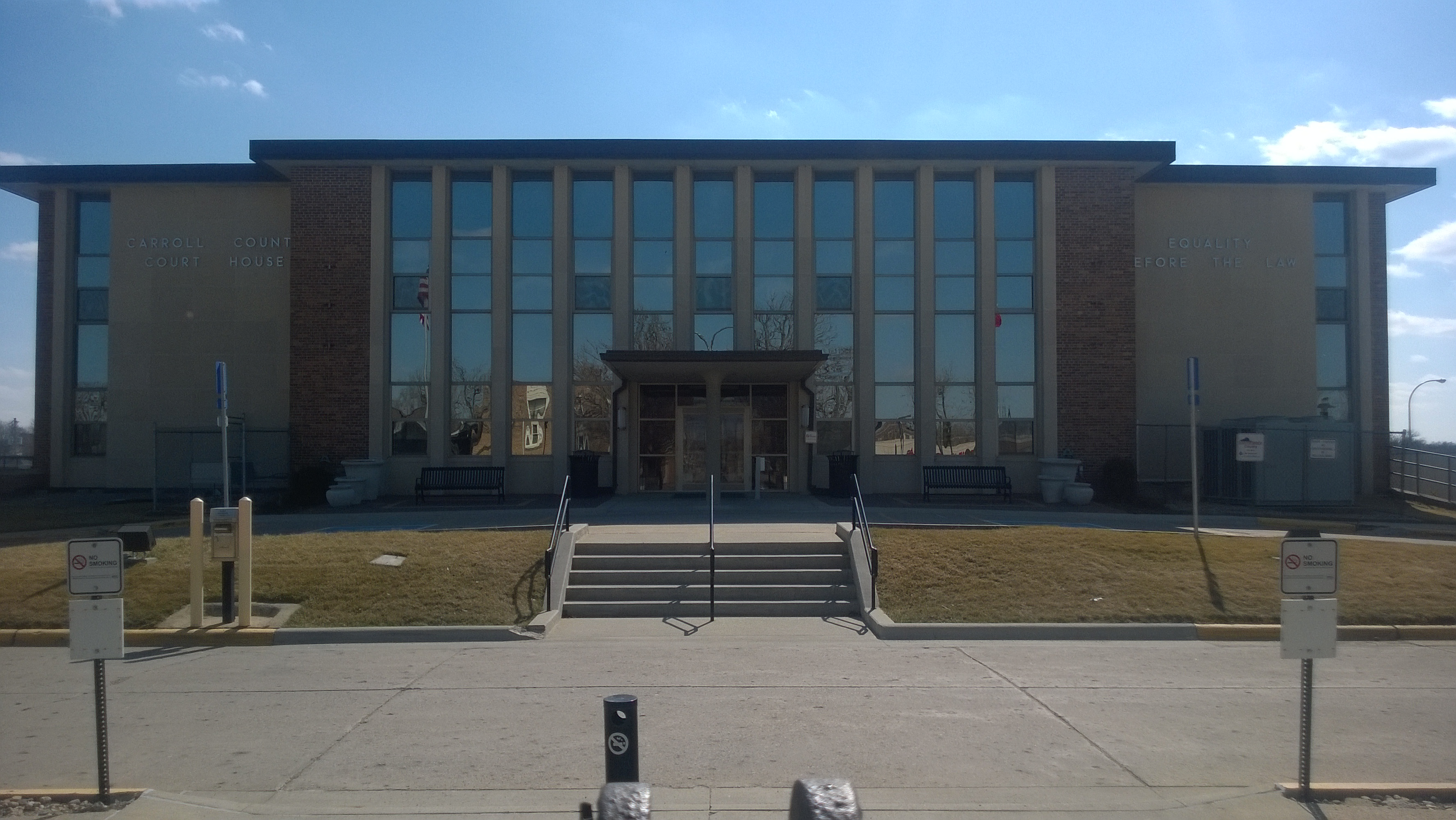
- Carroll County Courthouse

- Location within the U.S. state of Iowa
- Coordinates: 42°02′14″N 94°51′32″W
- Country: United States
- State: Iowa
- Founded: 1851
- Named for: Charles Carroll of Carrollton
- Seat: Carroll
- Largest city: Carroll

Area
  - Total: 570 sq mi (1,500 km^{2})
  - Land: 569 sq mi (1,470 km^{2})
  - Water: 0.8 sq mi (2.1 km^{2}) 0.1%

Population (2020)
  - Total: 20,760
  - Estimate (2025): 20,303 ▼
  - Density: 36.5/sq mi (14.1/km^{2})
- Time zone: UTC−6 (Central)
  - Summer (DST): UTC−5 (CDT)
- Congressional district: 4th
- Website: www.carrollcountyiowa.gov
- Iowa county number 14

Carroll County is a county located in the U.S. state of Iowa. As of the 2020 census, the population was 20,760. Its county seat is Carroll. The county is named in honor of Charles Carroll of Carrollton, signer of the Declaration of Independence.

== History ==
Carroll County was formed on January 15, 1851, from sections of Pottawattamie County. It was named after Charles Carroll of Carrollton, Maryland, the only Roman Catholic and longest-living signer of the Declaration of Independence. In 1855, the county government was established in Carrollton and in 1858, the first courthouse was built. In 1869, the seat was moved to Carroll City (today Carroll) which was centrally located and connected to the Chicago and North Western Transportation Company. The courthouse was destroyed in 1886 by fire. The present courthouse was erected in 1965. However the courthouse is set to go under construction in the near future.

== Geography ==
According to the U.S. Census Bureau, the county has a total area of 570 square miles (1,500 km^{2}), of which 569 square miles (1,470 km^{2}) is land and 0.8 square miles (2.1 km^{2}) (0.1%) is water.

Soils of Carroll County

=== Major highways ===
- U.S. Highway 30
- U.S. Highway 71
- Iowa Highway 141

=== Adjacent counties ===
- Sac County (northwest)
- Calhoun County (northeast)
- Greene County (east)
- Guthrie County (southeast)
- Audubon County (south)
- Crawford County (west)

== Demographics ==
Historical population
Census	Pop.	Note	%±
1860	281		—
1870	2,451		772.2%
1880	12,351		403.9%
1890	18,825		52.4%
1900	20,319		7.9%
1910	20,117		−1.0%
1920	21,549		7.1%
1930	22,326		3.6%
1940	22,770		2.0%
1950	23,065		1.3%
1960	23,431		1.6%
1970	22,912		−2.2%
1980	22,951		0.2%
1990	21,423		−6.7%
2000	21,421		0.0%
2010	20,816		−2.8%
2020	20,760		−0.3%
2025 (est.)	20,303	▼	−2.2%
U.S. Decennial Census; 1790-1960 1900-1990; 1990-2000 2010-2018

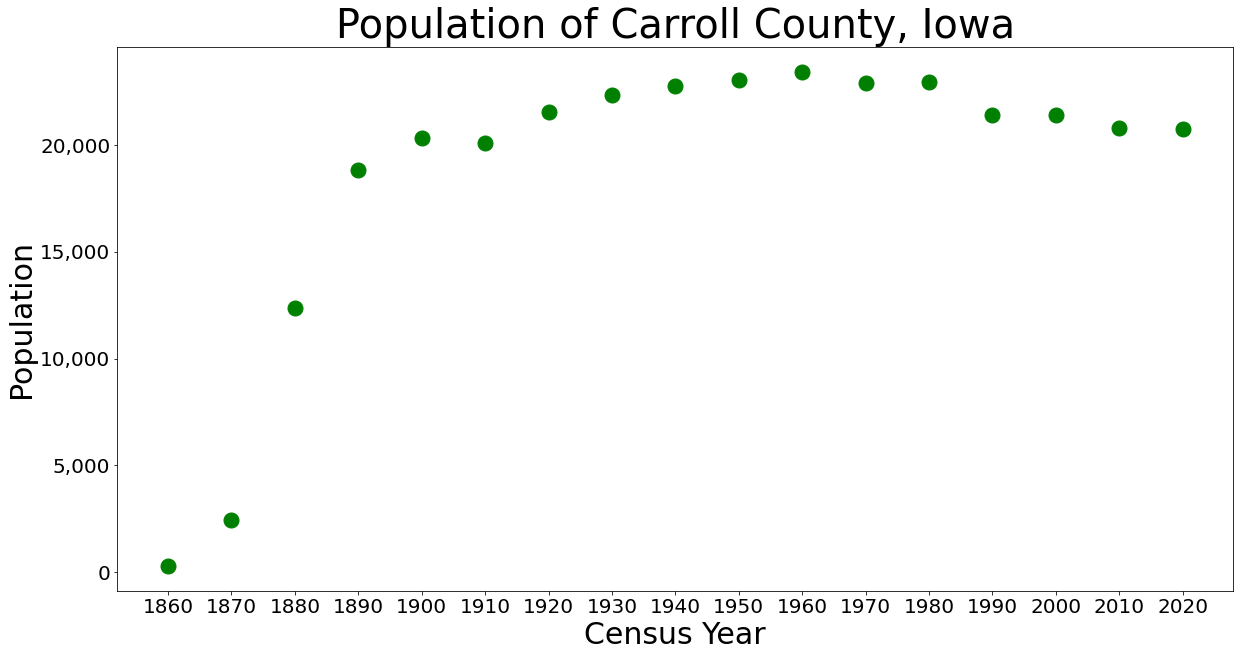
Population of Carroll County from US census data

=== 2020 census ===
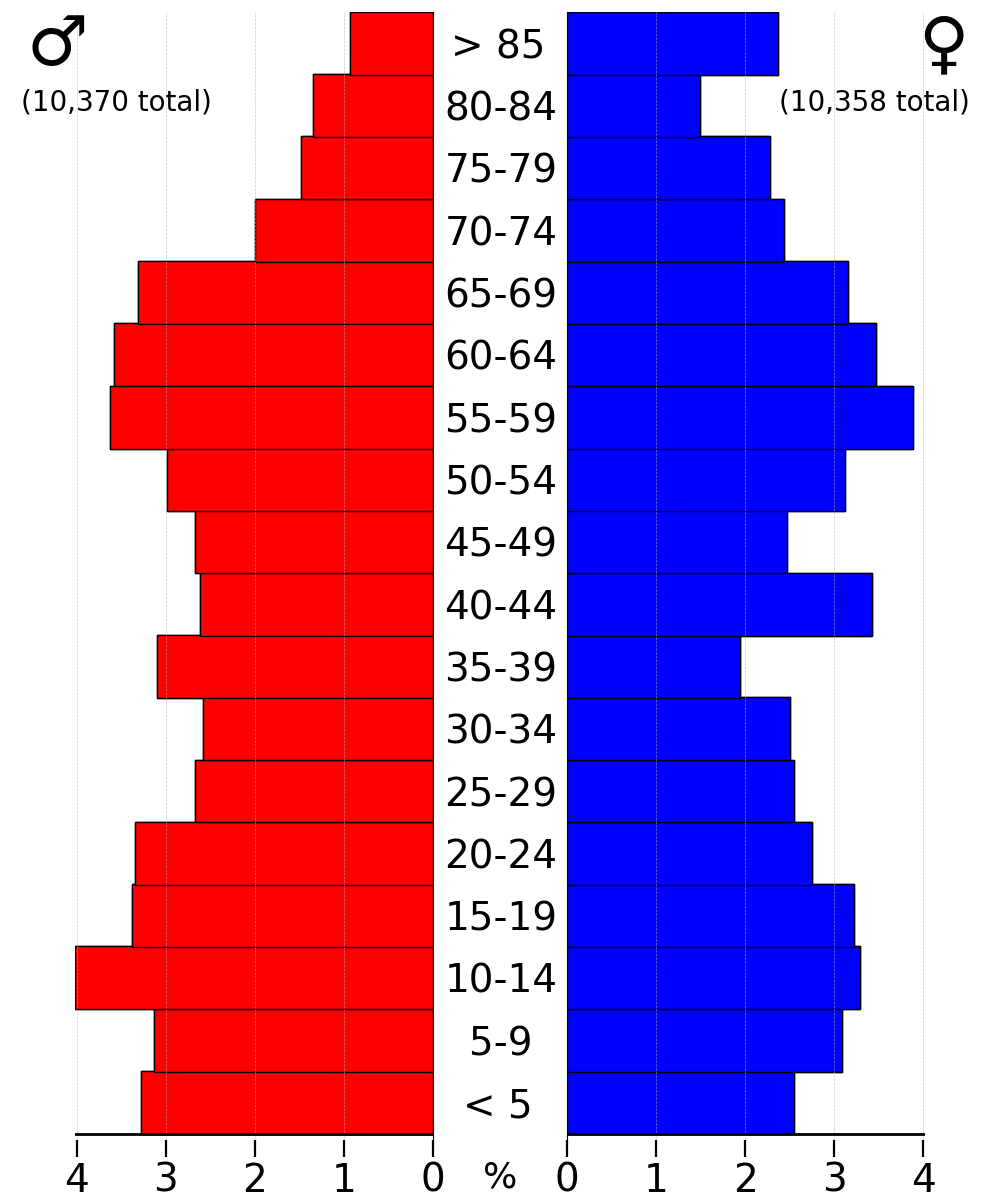
2022 US Census population pyramid for Carroll County from ACS 5-year estimates

As of the 2020 census, the county had a population of 20,760. The median age was 42.5 years, 24.0% of residents were under the age of 18, and 21.5% of residents were 65 years of age or older. For every 100 females there were 97.9 males, and for every 100 females age 18 and over there were 94.0 males age 18 and over.

The racial makeup of the county was 94.1% White, 1.3% Black or African American, 0.2% American Indian and Alaska Native, 0.4% Asian, <0.1% Native Hawaiian and Pacific Islander, 1.2% from some other race, and 2.9% from two or more races. Hispanic or Latino residents of any race comprised 2.9% of the population.

There were 8,764 households in the county, of which 27.1% had children under the age of 18 living in them. Of all households, 51.0% were married-couple households, 18.9% were households with a male householder and no spouse or partner present, and 24.5% were households with a female householder and no spouse or partner present. About 32.8% of all households were made up of individuals and 15.7% had someone living alone who was 65 years of age or older. There were 9,490 housing units, of which 7.7% were vacant; among occupied housing units, 74.8% were owner-occupied and 25.2% were renter-occupied, with a 1.6% homeowner vacancy rate and a 9.2% rental vacancy rate.

48.9% of residents lived in urban areas, while 51.1% lived in rural areas.

=== 2010 census ===
The 2010 census recorded a population of 20,816 in the county, with a population density of 36.6/sq mi (14.1/km^{2}). There were 9,376 housing units, of which 8,683 were occupied.

=== 2000 census ===
As of the census of 2000, there were 21,421 people, 8,486 households, and 5,668 families residing in the county. The population density was 38 people per square mile (15 people/km^{2}). There were 9,019 housing units at an average density of 16 units per square mile (6.2 units/km^{2}). The racial makeup of the county was 98.87% White, 0.18% Black or African American, 0.10% Native American, 0.34% Asian, 0.20% from other races, and 0.31% from two or more races. 0.54% of the population were Hispanic or Latino of any race.

There were 8,486 households, out of which 32.90% had children under the age of 18 living with them, 57.00% were married couples living together, 6.80% had a female householder with no husband present, and 33.20% were non-families. 29.60% of all households were made up of individuals, and 15.50% had someone living alone who was 65 years of age or older. The average household size was 2.46 and the average family size was 3.07.

In the county, the population was spread out, with 26.90% under the age of 18, 7.40% from 18 to 24, 25.90% from 25 to 44, 21.00% from 45 to 64, and 18.70% who were 65 years of age or older. The median age was 39 years. For every 100 females there were 95.10 males. For every 100 females age 18 and over, there were 92.00 males.

The median income for a household in the county was $37,275, and the median income for a family was $47,040. Males had a median income of $30,074 versus $21,528 for females. The per capita income for the county was $18,595. About 4.50% of families and 6.50% of the population were below the poverty line, including 6.10% of those under age 18 and 8.20% of those age 65 or over.

== Communities ==
=== Cities ===
- Arcadia
- Breda
- Carroll
- Coon Rapids
- Dedham
- Glidden
- Halbur
- Lanesboro
- Lidderdale
- Manning
- Ralston
- Templeton
- Willey

=== Townships ===
Carroll County is divided into sixteen townships:

- Arcadia
- Eden
- Ewoldt
- Glidden
- Grant
- Jasper
- Kniest
- Maple River
- Newton
- Pleasant Valley
- Richland
- Roselle
- Sheridan
- Union
- Washington
- Wheatland

=== Population ranking ===
The population ranking of the following table is based on the 2020 census of Carroll County. † county seat

Rank	City/Town/etc.	Municipal type	Population (2020 Census)
1	† Carroll	City	10,321
2	Manning	City	1,455
3	Coon Rapids (partially in Guthrie County)	City	1,300
4	Glidden	City	1,151
5	Arcadia	City	525
6	Breda	City	500
7	Templeton	City	352
8	Dedham	City	224
9	Halbur	City	243
10	Lidderdale	City	166
11	Lanesboro	City	119
12	Ralston (partially in Greene County)	City	76 (81 total)
13	Willey	City	73

== Politics ==
United States presidential election results for Carroll County, Iowa
Year	Republican		Democratic		Third party(ies)	
Year	No.	%	No.	%	No.	%
1896	2,066	45.67%	2,417	53.43%	41	0.91%
1900	2,224	47.34%	2,434	51.81%	40	0.85%
1904	2,290	51.22%	2,040	45.63%	141	3.15%
1908	1,865	41.93%	2,510	56.43%	73	1.64%
1912	664	15.51%	2,326	54.32%	1,292	30.17%
1916	2,408	53.10%	2,085	45.98%	42	0.93%
1920	6,320	72.89%	2,174	25.07%	177	2.04%
1924	3,590	41.06%	1,994	22.80%	3,160	36.14%
1928	4,014	39.47%	6,134	60.32%	21	0.21%
1932	2,265	23.84%	7,174	75.52%	60	0.63%
1936	3,259	31.03%	6,285	59.84%	959	9.13%
1940	5,376	49.22%	5,526	50.59%	21	0.19%
1944	4,833	50.04%	4,799	49.68%	27	0.28%
1948	3,974	40.61%	5,711	58.36%	101	1.03%
1952	7,473	64.27%	4,139	35.60%	16	0.14%
1956	5,816	53.29%	5,085	46.60%	12	0.11%
1960	4,648	39.66%	7,064	60.27%	9	0.08%
1964	2,387	23.39%	7,807	76.49%	13	0.13%
1968	3,927	42.68%	4,809	52.26%	466	5.06%
1972	4,415	47.55%	4,608	49.63%	262	2.82%
1976	4,094	42.61%	5,333	55.51%	181	1.88%
1980	5,017	51.53%	3,885	39.90%	835	8.58%
1984	5,021	49.83%	4,960	49.22%	96	0.95%
1988	3,701	39.91%	5,437	58.63%	135	1.46%
1992	3,439	36.30%	3,800	40.11%	2,236	23.60%
1996	3,392	38.59%	4,333	49.29%	1,065	12.12%
2000	4,879	50.99%	4,463	46.65%	226	2.36%
2004	5,762	54.75%	4,689	44.56%	73	0.69%
2008	4,922	47.35%	5,302	51.01%	171	1.65%
2012	5,601	52.47%	4,947	46.35%	126	1.18%
2016	6,638	62.96%	3,309	31.38%	597	5.66%
2020	7,737	68.26%	3,454	30.47%	144	1.27%
2024	7,814	70.14%	3,153	28.30%	173	1.55%

== See also ==
- National Register of Historic Places listings in Carroll County, Iowa
