= Templeton, Iowa =

- City
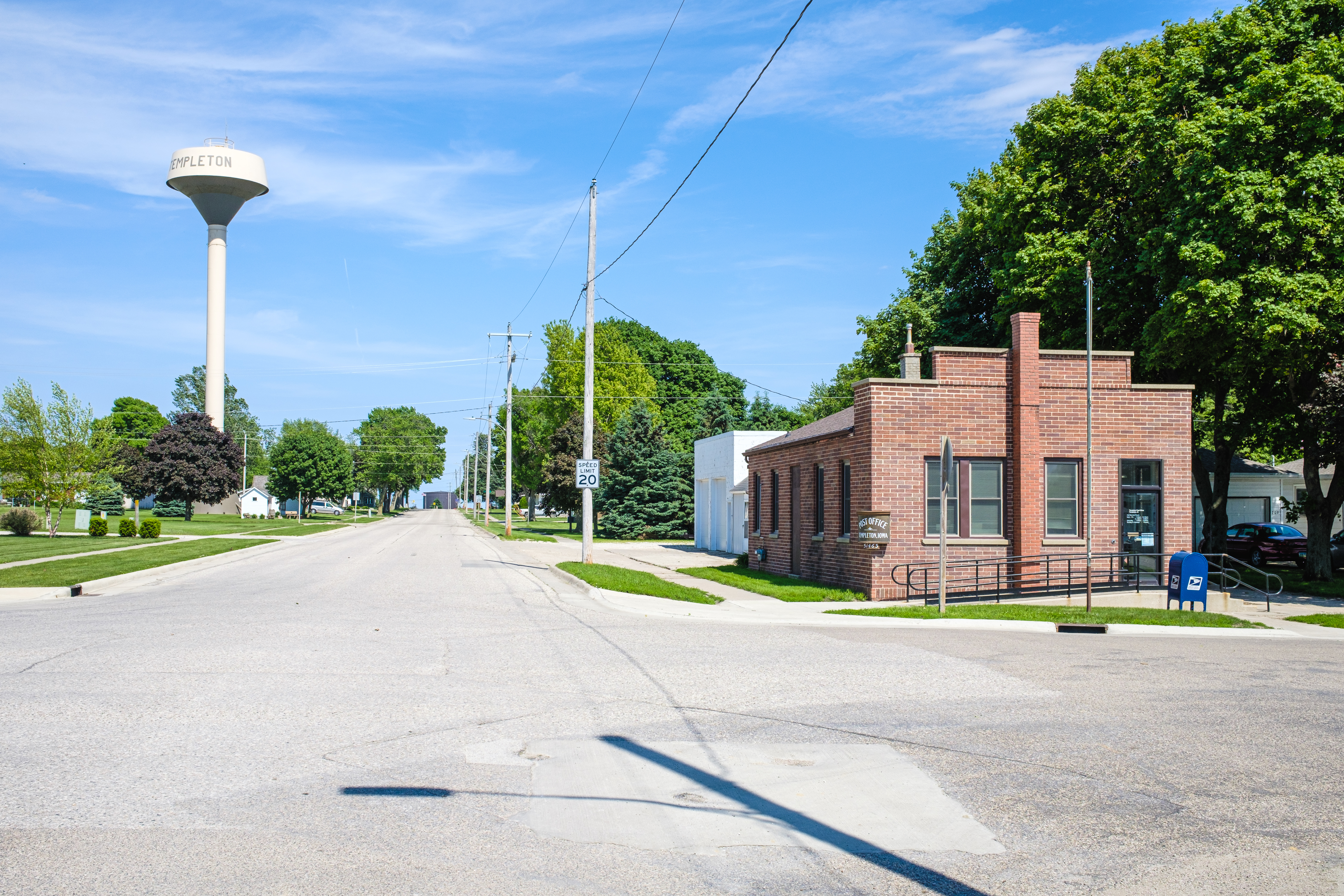
- Looking East on 2nd Street in Templeton
- Motto: "A Strong Community Spirit"
- Location of Templeton, Iowa
- Coordinates: 41°55′05″N 94°56′29″W
- Country: USA
- State: Iowa
- County: Carroll

Area
  - Total: 0.45 sq mi (1.17 km^{2})
  - Land: 0.45 sq mi (1.17 km^{2})
  - Water: 0 sq mi (0.00 km^{2})
- Elevation: 1,447 ft (441 m)

Population (2020)
  - Total: 352
  - Density: 780.9/sq mi (301.49/km^{2})
- Time zone: UTC-6 (Central (CST))
  - Summer (DST): UTC-5 (CDT)
- ZIP code: 51463
- Area code: 712
- FIPS code: 19-77340
- GNIS feature ID: 2396038
- Website: City of Templeton, Iowa Website

Templeton is a city in Carroll County, Iowa, United States. The population was 352 at the time of the 2020 census.

== History ==
Templeton was platted in 1882. The city was probably named for a railroad worker. The city was incorporated on September 28, 1883.

The city is perhaps best known as the home of Templeton Rye, a "brand" of rye manufactured during the prohibition era that was very popular in Chicago, Omaha, and Kansas City speakeasies. Many enterprising Carroll County farmers found this to be a viable way to supplement income during the Great Depression. At the height of the bootlegging during the Great Depression, Templeton with a population of less than 500 people, was using three railroad cars of sugar a month.

== Geography ==
According to the United States Census Bureau, the city has a total area of 0.43 square miles (1.11 km^{2}), all land.

== Demographics ==
Historical populations
Year	Pop.	±%
1890	269	—
1900	321	+19.3%
1910	278	−13.4%
1920	373	+34.2%
1930	428	+14.7%
1940	390	−8.9%
1950	385	−1.3%
1960	354	−8.1%
1970	312	−11.9%
1980	319	+2.2%
1990	321	+0.6%
2000	334	+4.0%
2010	362	+8.4%
2020	352	−2.8%
Source:"U.S. Census website". United States Census Bureau. and Iowa Data Center; Source: U.S. Decennial Census

=== 2020 census ===
As of the census of 2020, there were 352 people, 153 households, and 104 families residing in the city. The population density was 780.9 inhabitants per square mile (301.5/km^{2}). There were 158 housing units at an average density of 350.5 per square mile (135.3/km^{2}). The racial makeup of the city was 97.4% White, 0.6% Black or African American, 0.0% Native American, 0.3% Asian, 0.0% Pacific Islander, 0.0% from other races and 1.7% from two or more races. Hispanic or Latino persons of any race comprised 0.3% of the population.

Of the 153 households, 29.4% of which had children under the age of 18 living with them, 58.8% were married couples living together, 7.2% were cohabitating couples, 20.9% had a female householder with no spouse or partner present and 13.1% had a male householder with no spouse or partner present. 32.0% of all households were non-families. 29.4% of all households were made up of individuals, 15.7% had someone living alone who was 65 years old or older.

The median age in the city was 40.2 years. 25.0% of the residents were under the age of 20; 5.1% were between the ages of 20 and 24; 22.7% were from 25 and 44; 27.3% were from 45 and 64; and 19.9% were 65 years of age or older. The gender makeup of the city was 50.0% male and 50.0% female.

=== 2010 census ===
As of the census of 2010, there were 362 people, 156 households, and 107 families residing in the city. The population density was 841.9 inhabitants per square mile (325.1/km^{2}). There were 159 housing units at an average density of 369.8 per square mile (142.8/km^{2}). The racial makeup of the city was 98.6% White, 1.1% African American, and 0.3% Asian. Hispanic or Latino of any race were 0.3% of the population.

There were 156 households, of which 26.9% had children under the age of 18 living with them, 54.5% were married couples living together, 9.0% had a female householder with no husband present, 5.1% had a male householder with no wife present, and 31.4% were non-families. 27.6% of all households were made up of individuals, and 11.5% had someone living alone who was 65 years of age or older. The average household size was 2.32 and the average family size was 2.75.

The median age in the city was 43.6 years. 24.6% of residents were under the age of 18; 8.2% were between the ages of 18 and 24; 18.8% were from 25 to 44; 29.9% were from 45 to 64; and 18.5% were 65 years of age or older. The gender makeup of the city was 48.1% male and 51.9% female.

=== 2000 census ===
As of the census of 2000, there were 334 people, 144 households, and 95 families residing in the city. The population density was 816.7 inhabitants per square mile (315.3/km^{2}). There were 151 housing units at an average density of 369.2 per square mile (142.5/km^{2}). The racial makeup of the city was 99.10% White, 0.30% African American and 0.60% Native American.

There were 144 households, out of which 29.9% had children under the age of 18 living with them, 60.4% were married couples living together, 4.2% had a female householder with no husband present, and 34.0% were non-families. 30.6% of all households were made up of individuals, and 18.1% had someone living alone who was 65 years of age or older. The average household size was 2.32 and the average family size was 2.93.

In the city, the population was spread out, with 25.4% under the age of 18, 6.3% from 18 to 24, 29.0% from 25 to 44, 20.1% from 45 to 64, and 19.2% who were 65 years of age or older. The median age was 39 years. For every 100 females, there were 90.9 males. For every 100 females age 18 and over, there were 94.5 males.

The median income for a household in the city was $37,500, and the median income for a family was $44,375. Males had a median income of $35,208 versus $18,750 for females. The per capita income for the city was $18,703. About 4.9% of families and 3.2% of the population were below the poverty line, including none of those under age 18 and 11.3% of those age 65 or over.

== Education ==
The public school district is the Carroll Community School District. A small section is within the IKM–Manning Community School District.

Previously Templeton was in the Templeton Independent School District, which mostly became absorbed by the Carroll district. In 1973 the Carroll district sold the Templeton school to the town government for $3,700.
