= Tornadoes of 2024 =

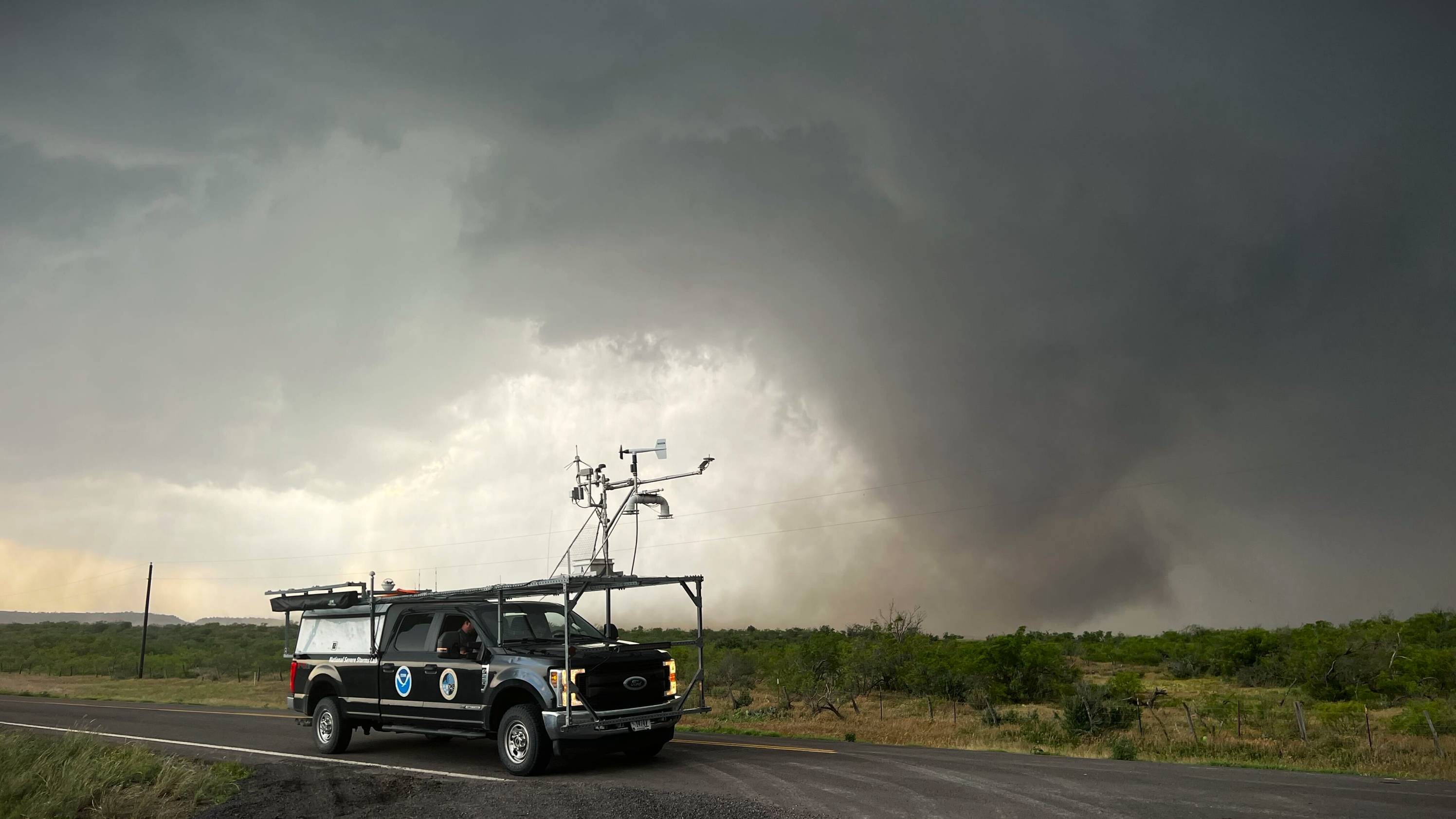
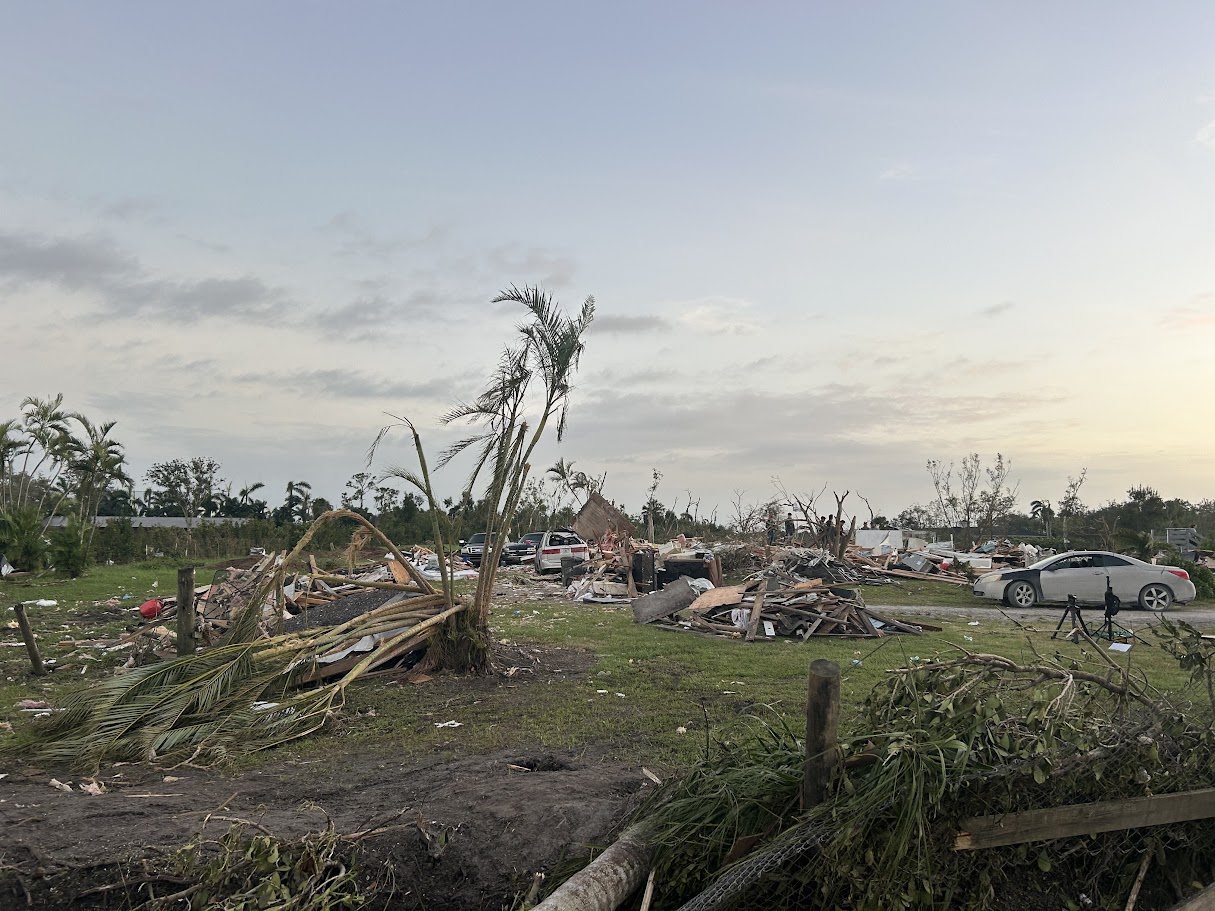
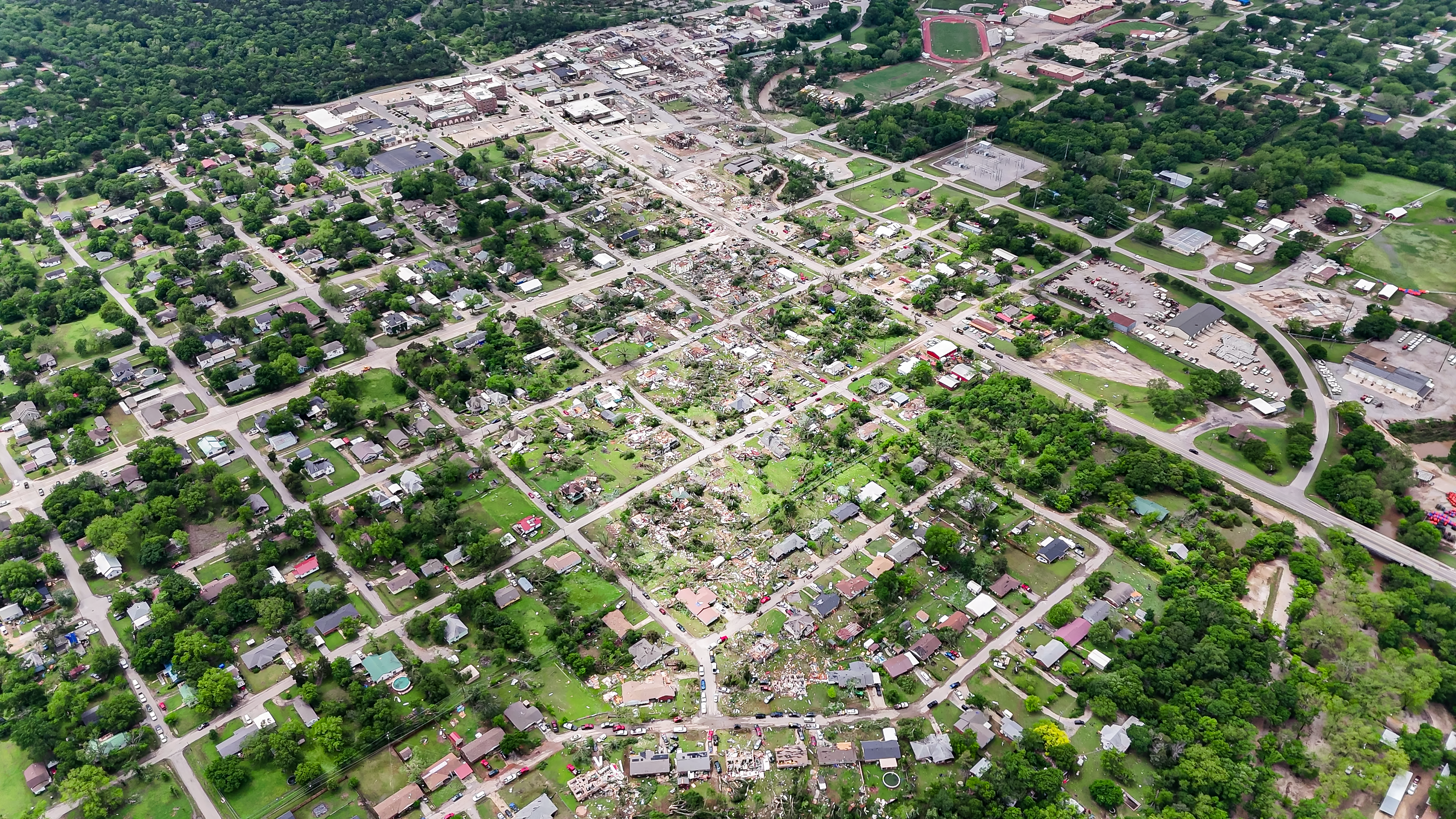
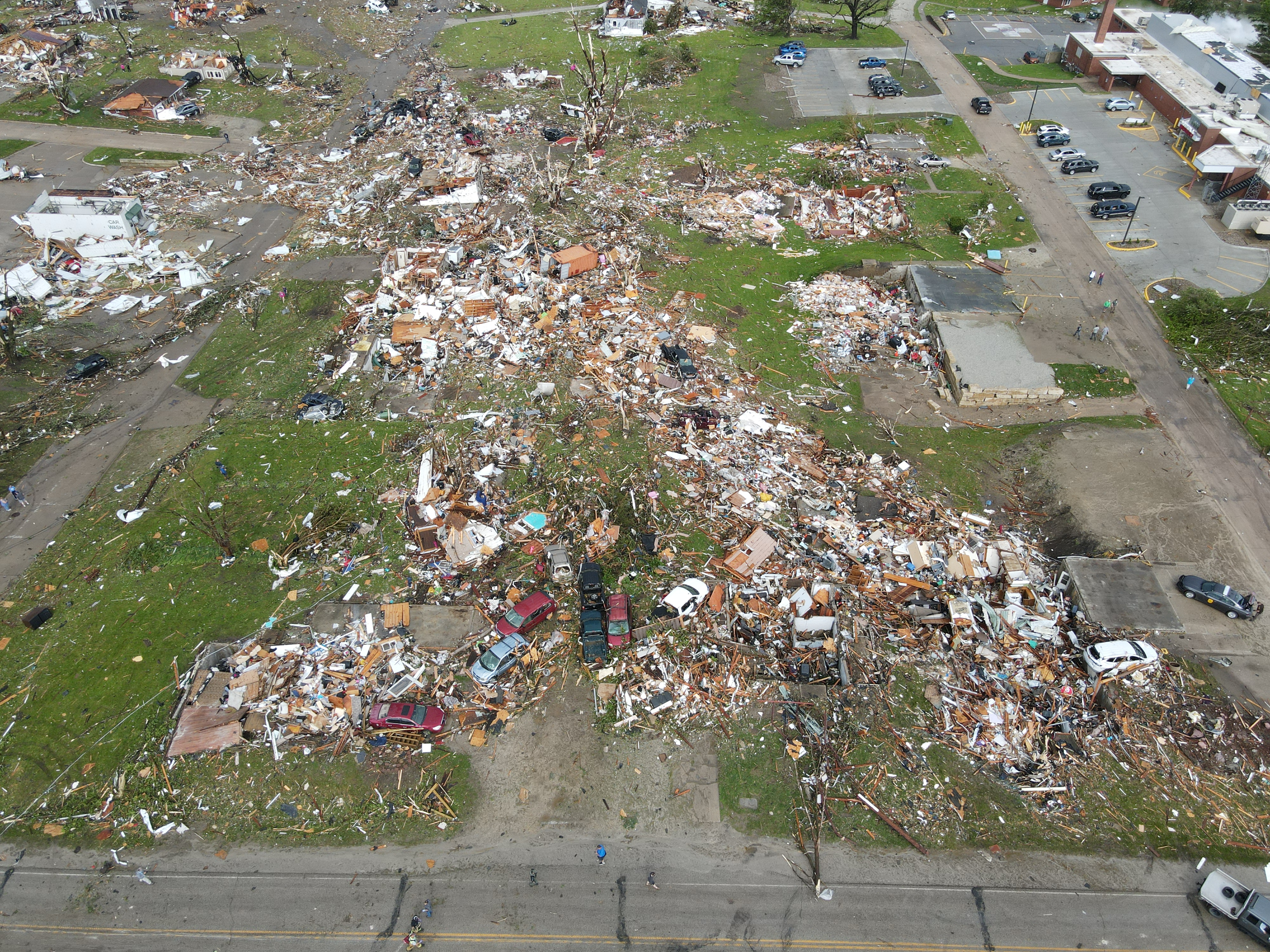
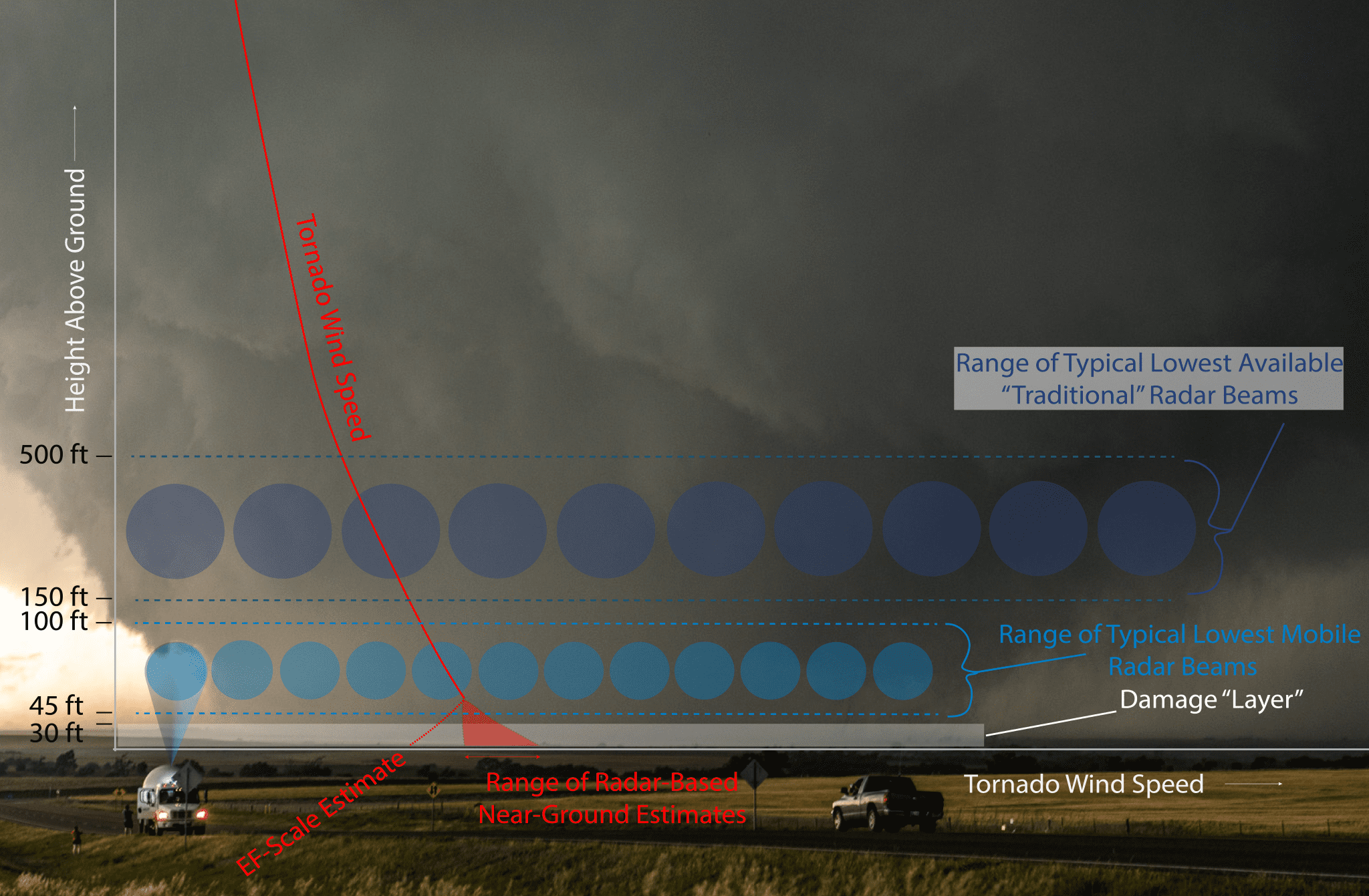
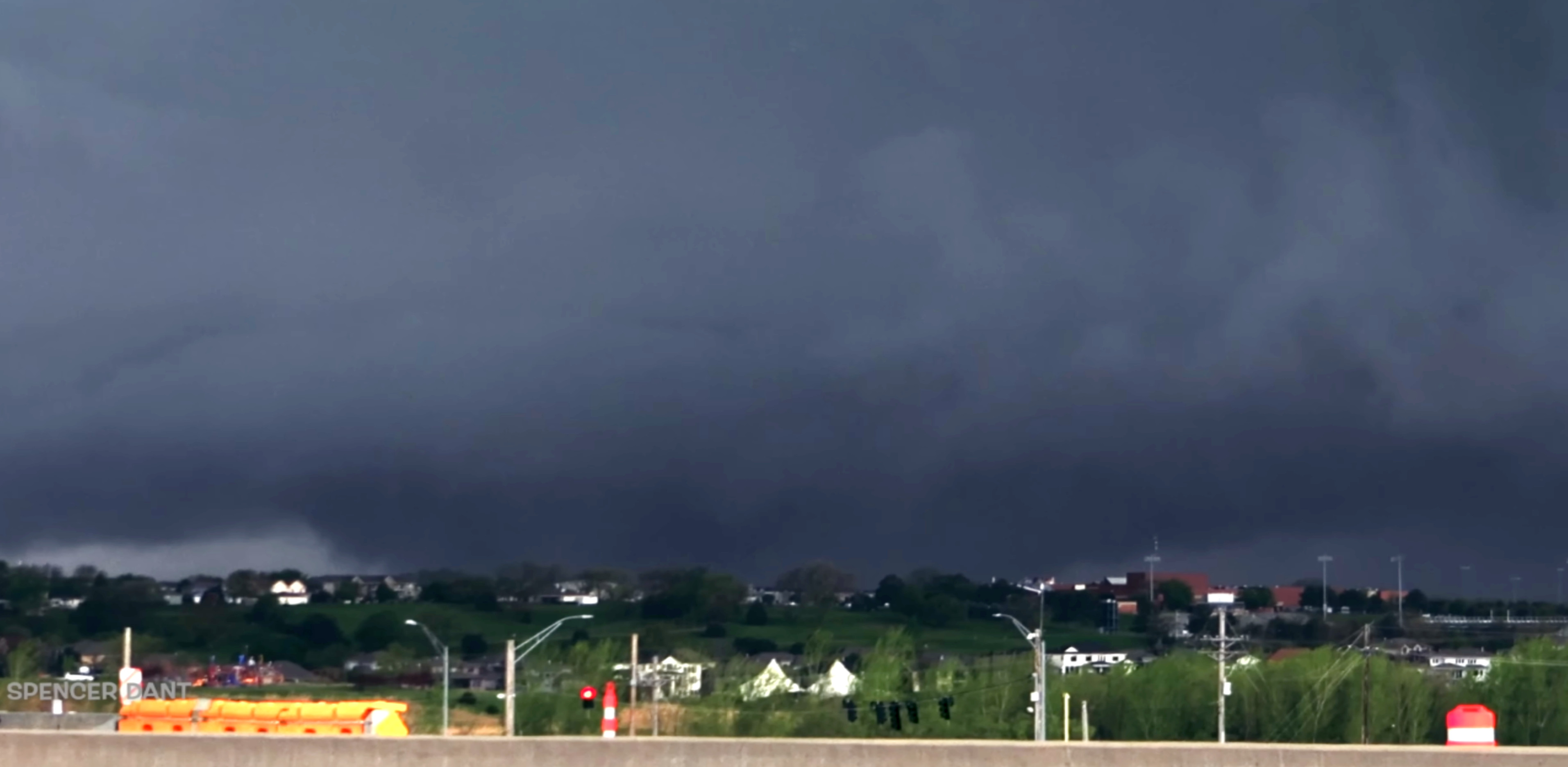
- Clockwise from top: An NSSL Mobile Mesonet Truck observing an EF2 tornado near Eldorado, Oklahoma on May 23; Aerial view of high-end EF3 damage to structures in downtown Sulphur, Oklahoma following a tornado on April 27; An illustration of where traditional and mobile radars usually scan a tornado or its parent circulation relative to where damage occurs, superimposed over an EF2 tornado near Custer City, Oklahoma on May 19; A large EF4 tornado in Elkhorn, Nebraska on April 26; Aerial view of EF4 damage to destroyed homes in northeastern Greenfield, Iowa following a tornado on May 21; EF3 damage to a mobile home in Wellington, Florida following a tornado spawned by Hurricane Milton on October 9.
- Timespan: January 3 – December 31
- Maximum rated tornado: EF4 tornado: Elkhorn–Blair, Nebraska on April 26; Marietta, Oklahoma on April 27; Barnsdall, Oklahoma on May 6; Greenfield, Iowa on May 21
- Tornadoes in U.S.: 1,796
- Fatalities (U.S.): 53
- Fatalities (worldwide): 90

This page documents notable tornadoes and tornado outbreaks worldwide in 2024. Strong and destructive tornadoes form most frequently in the United States, Argentina, Southern Brazil, the Bengal region, and China, but can occur almost anywhere under the right conditions. Tornadoes also develop occasionally in southern Canada during summer in the Northern Hemisphere and somewhat regularly at other times of the year across Europe, South Africa, Japan, Australia and New Zealand. Tornadic events are often accompanied by other forms of severe weather, including thunderstorms, strong winds and hail.

Worldwide, 90 tornado-related deaths were confirmed – 53 in the United States, 14 in China, 12 in South Africa, five in India, three in Indonesia, two in Mexico and one in Russia.

In the United States, the year started off with a below average number of tornadoes through the first three months despite a few significant outbreaks on January 9, February 27–28, and March 13–15. However, the El Niño pattern that was in place during that period weakened in April; the pattern shift caused the more traditional Tornado Alley zone to rapidly become extremely favorable for tornado outbreaks, and several large outbreaks occurred in a month-long span between April 26 and May 26; almost 700 tornadoes touched down across the United States, causing widespread destruction and dozens of casualties. The worst events occurred on April 26, May 6 - 8, and May 21.

Average to above average activity continued through essentially the rest of the year as several derechos and multiple tornado outbreaks spawned by tropical cyclones occurred across the United States.

As a result, 2024 ended as the second most active year on record for tornadoes and the most active season of the 2020s decade so far, with 1,880 preliminary reports and at least 1,796 confirmed tornadoes. Only 2004 had more tornadoes with 1,817. This year surpassed 2019 as the busiest year ever recorded in Oklahoma, with at least 152 confirmed tornadoes. With a violent tornado occurring near Marietta in Oklahoma, 2024 was the first year since 2016 to feature an EF4 tornado in Oklahoma. Another EF4 tornado struck Barnsdall in northeast Oklahoma, marking it the first time since 2013 Oklahoma saw more than one violent tornado. 2024 was also the busiest year on record for tornadoes in Florida, Illinois, Iowa, New York, Ohio and West Virginia. Additionally, 2024 was the final year of a record EF5 drought, as a tornado of such intensity occurred the following year.

== Events ==
=== United States ===
Confirmed tornadoes by Enhanced Fujita rating
EFU	EF0	EF1	EF2	EF3	EF4	EF5	Total
254	593	762	139	44	4	0	1,796

Fatal United States tornadoes in 2024
- Approximate touchdown location of deadly tornadoes in 2024 Summary of tornadoes: January 9 – Florida, Alabama (1 death); January 9 – North Carolina (1 death); March 14 – Ohio (3 deaths); March 14 – Indiana, Ohio (1 death); April 26 – Iowa (1 death); April 27 – Oklahoma (1 death); April 27 – Oklahoma (2 deaths); April 27 – Oklahoma (1 death); April 28 – Texas (1 death); April 30 – Kansas (1 death); May 6 – Oklahoma (2 deaths); May 8 – Tennessee (1 death); May 10 – Florida (2 deaths); May 13 – Louisiana (1 death); May 21 – Iowa (5 deaths); May 25 – Texas (7 deaths); May 25 – Oklahoma (2 deaths); May 26 – Arkansas (4 deaths); May 26 – Arkansas (1 death); May 26 – Kentucky (1 death); June 5 – Michigan (1 death); July 8 – Louisiana (2 deaths); July 16 – New York (1 death); August 8 – North Carolina (1 death); September 26 – Georgia (2 deaths); October 9 – Florida (6 deaths); December 28 – Texas (1 death); Total fatalities: 53

A map of 2024 United States tornado paths from the results of preliminary surveys.

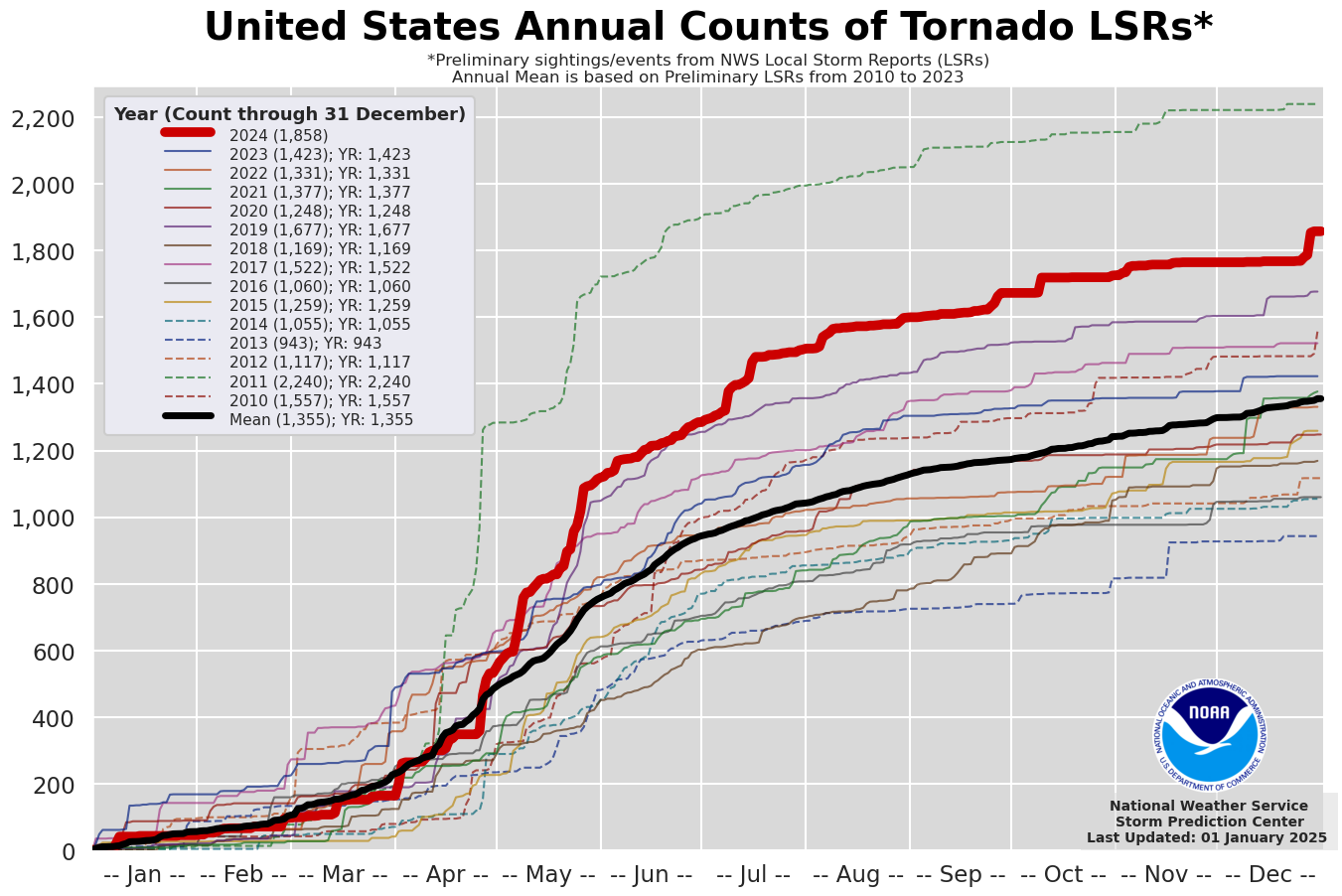
A chart of the 2024 United States tornado local storm report count compared to years 2010 through 2023, and the 2010–2023 mean.

=== Europe ===
IFU	IF0	IF0.5	IF1	IF1.5	IF2	IF2.5	IF3	IF4	IF5	Total
125	19	78	97	57	22	2	1	0	0	400

- Note: Some tornadoes have been rated using different scales. They are counted as their closest IF-Scale equivalent on this table.

=== China ===
Confirmed tornadoes by Enhanced Fujita rating
EFU	EF0	EF1	EF2	EF3	EF4	EF5	Total
40	12	26	9	4	0	0	118

- Note: 27 tornadoes have been confirmed, but not yet rated.

== January ==
=== January 3 (Belgium) ===
On January 3, a tornado struck the communities of Onze-Lieve-Vrouw-Waver and Putte in Belgium. Multiple houses had roofing material torn off, one of which sustained collapse of a gable. Garages, outbuildings, and greenhouses were destroyed and gravestones were damaged at a cemetery. Trees and fences were toppled over as well. One person along with several horses were injured. The European Severe Storms Laboratory rated the tornado IF1.5.

=== January 8–9 (United States) ===
EFU	EF0	EF1	EF2	EF3	EF4	EF5
0	16	15	6	1	0	0

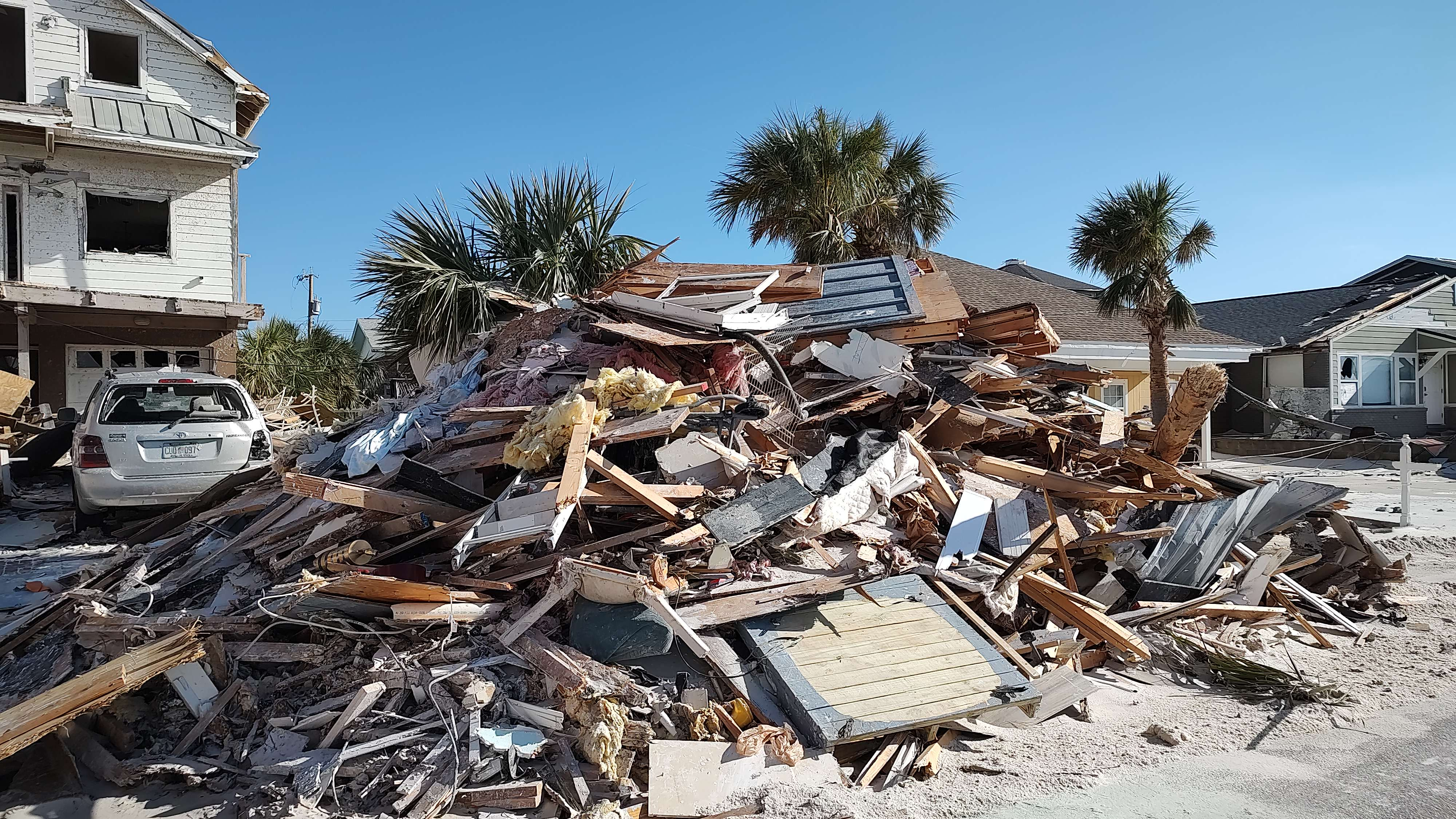
Remains of a home that was ripped from its raised pier foundation and leveled at low-end EF3 intensity in Lower Grand Lagoon, Florida

During the evening of January 8 through January 9, a severe weather outbreak brought damaging winds and numerous tornadoes to the Southeastern and Eastern United States. On January 7, the Storm Prediction Center issued an enhanced risk for severe weather in the states of Texas, Louisiana, Mississippi, Alabama, and Florida, including a 10% hatched risk for tornadoes. The outbreak began with several brief EF0 tornadoes touching down in Louisiana and Mississippi on January 8. Later that night, multiple tornadic supercell thunderstorms formed over the Gulf of Mexico, and began moving toward the Gulf Coast and Florida Panhandle. In the early morning hours of January 9, a powerful tornadic waterspout formed offshore of Panama City Beach, Florida and moved inland at EF3 intensity, causing major damage in the Lower Grand Lagoon community. Multiple homes, condominiums, apartment buildings, and businesses were severely damaged or destroyed and several large boat storage warehouses sustained significant damage at the Pirate's Cove Marina. The tornado continued to cause lesser damage in the western part of Panama City before it dissipated. A high-end EF2 tornado also touched down in Lynn Haven, causing significant damage along the shores of Deer Point Lake to dozens of mobile and frame homes. A brief but strong EF2 tornado significantly damaged a few houses in Callaway and an EF1 tornado caused moderate damage in Santa Rosa Beach as well.

Another strong EF2 tornado impacted the outskirts of Marianna, where many RVs were thrown and destroyed at an RV park, and dozens of frame homes were badly damaged or destroyed in subdivisions. The longest-tracked and widest tornado of the outbreak touched down southwest of Graceville before it crossed into Alabama and struck Cottonwood at EF2 strength, unroofing homes, collapsing the walls of a brick business, and completely destroying a Moose Lodge building. One person was killed northeast of Cottonwood when the tornado obliterated a mobile home. Several more EF1 tornadoes also touched down in Georgia, South Carolina, and North Carolina, including a tornado that struck the eastern edge of Claremont, North Carolina and rolled a manufactured home, resulting in another fatality. The final significant tornado of the day was an EF2 tornado that struck Bamberg, South Carolina, where multiple historic brick buildings were destroyed, and a barrel factory suffered major damage. Overall, 38 tornadoes were confirmed, resulting in two fatalities. Four additional fatalities unrelated to tornadoes occurred during the event as well. The system responsible for this tornado outbreak also produced heavy snow and blizzard conditions in parts of the Pacific Northwest, the Midwest, and the Northeastern United States.

=== January 18 (Indonesia) ===
A damaging tornado struck the villages of Walidono and Cangkring in East Java, damaging 253 homes and ten public buildings. 19 people were injured, two of them seriously.

== February ==
=== February 4 (Indonesia) ===
A tornado damaged or destroyed at least 300 homes and numerous other buildings as it moved through the villages of Kedung Wonokerto, Bendo Tretek, and Watutulis within the Prambon District in East Java. Sheet metal debris was scattered throughout the damage path and trees were downed. A man was killed by flying debris when the shop he was in was destroyed by the tornado, and at least one other person was injured.

=== February 4 (United States) ===
EFU	EF0	EF1	EF2	EF3	EF4	EF5
0	2	3	1	0	0	0

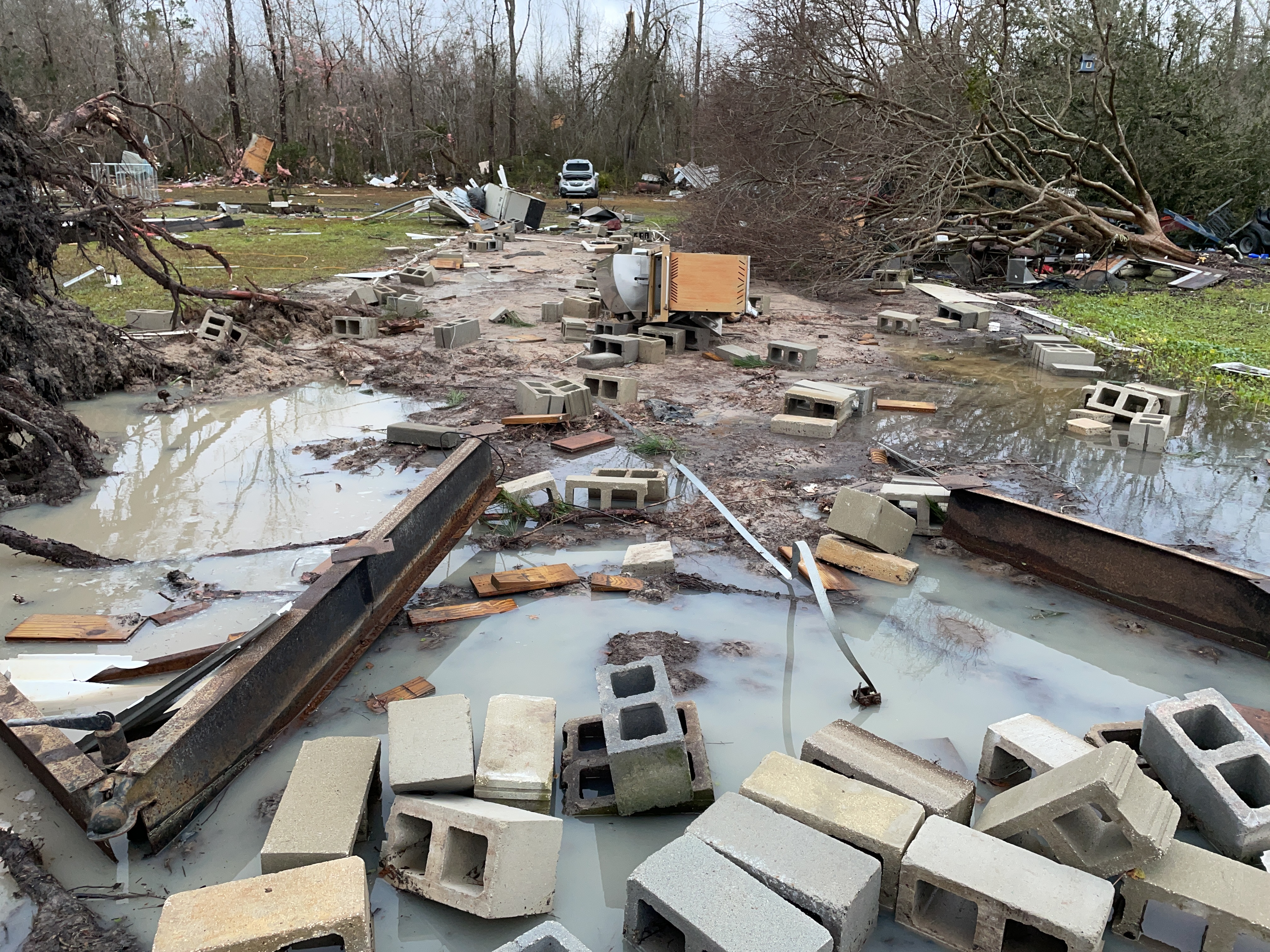
A mobile home that was destroyed at EF2 intensity on the east side of Valdosta, Georgia.

Several tornadoes touched down in Georgia and Florida on February 4, including an EF1 tornado that caused damage at the historic Seminole Plantation near Boston, Georgia. Cottages sustained roof, chimney, and structural damage and some open-air barns on the property were also damaged. Dozens of trees were downed as well, one of which landed on a building. The strongest tornado of the day produced EF2 damage near Valdosta, destroying two manufactured homes and injuring two people. An outbuilding was also destroyed, a metal building was severely damaged, and several other homes sustained less intense damage elsewhere along the path. A few weak tornadoes caused minor damage in Florida, including an EF0 tornado that touched down in the western outskirts of Jacksonville, damaging trees and fences and overturning a dumpster. A total of six tornadoes were confirmed.

=== February 8 (United States) ===
EFU	EF0	EF1	EF2	EF3	EF4	EF5
0	0	2	1	0	0	0

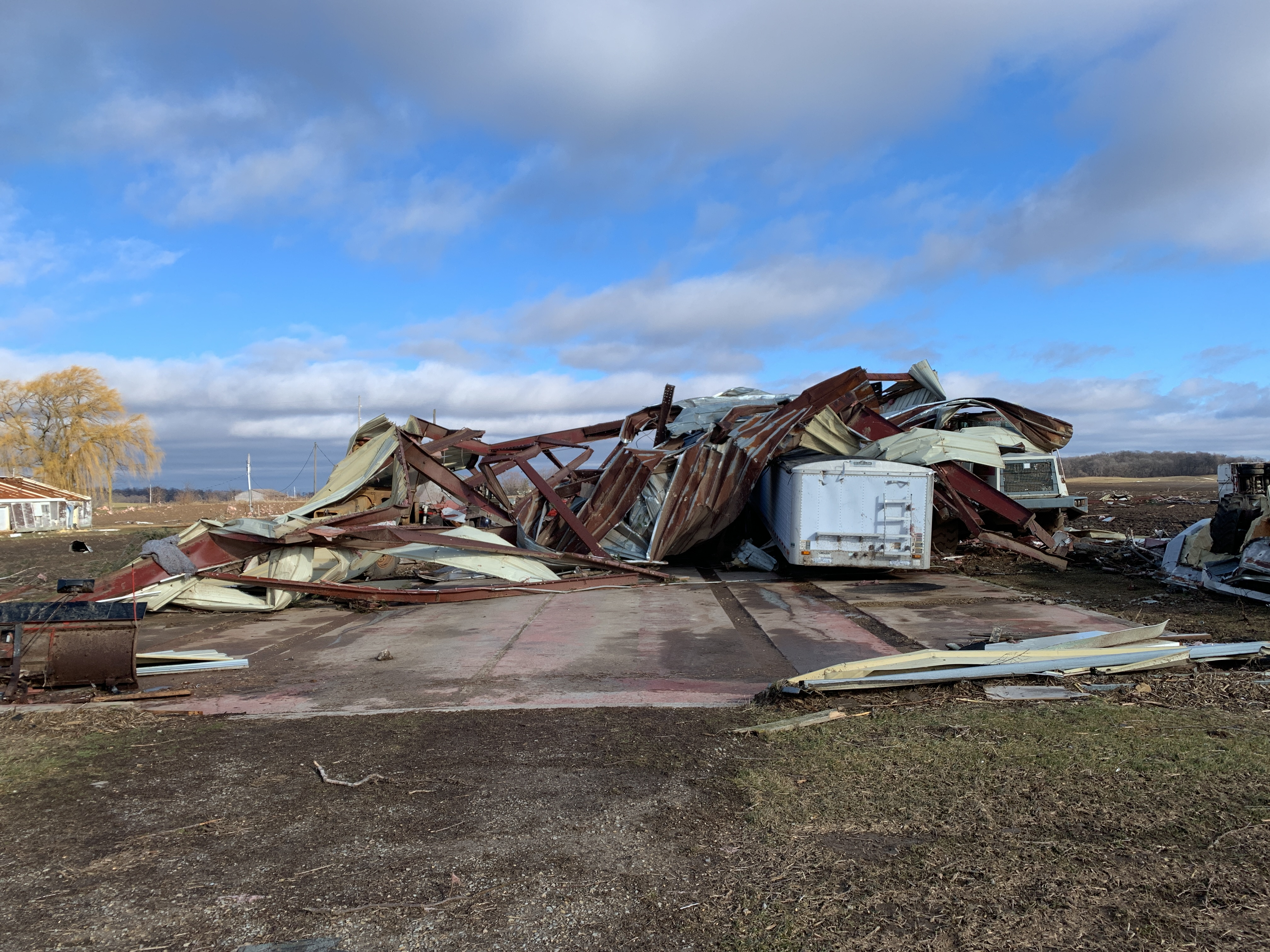
A large metal outbuilding that was destroyed at high-end EF2 intensity near Evansville, Wisconsin.

A localized severe weather event in Illinois and Wisconsin produced multiple supercells. One supercell produced the first ever recorded February tornado in Wisconsin near Juda, which heavily damaged a frail prefabricated house at high-end EF1 intensity, caused more minor damage to two other homes, destroyed outbuildings, and rolled several campers. The same supercell spawned a strong, long-tracked EF2 tornado that touched down near Evansville, Wisconsin, and moved through the rural community of Porter, causing significant damage to numerous farmsteads. Multiple houses were heavily damaged and had large portions of their roofs torn off, and many barns, sheds, and metal farm buildings were completely destroyed with debris scattered long distances across fields. Farming equipment was tossed around, trees and power poles were snapped, and one person was injured when the tornado blew their car off a road into a ditch. Less severe damage occurred in and around Albion and Busseyville before the tornado dissipated. The National Oceanic and Atmospheric Administration published the tornado caused more than $2.5 million in damage. An EF1 tornado that destroyed farm buildings, damaged a metal garage, and overturned a semi-truck near McNabb, Illinois was also confirmed.

=== February 14 (Cyprus and Turkey) ===
IFU	IF0	IF0.5	IF1	IF1.5	IF2	IF2.5	IF3	IF4	IF5
0	0	1	0	1	1	0	0	0	0

An IF1.5 and IF2 tornado struck populated areas in Germasogeia, Limassol, Cyprus on the night of February 14. Roughly 200 homes and apartment buildings sustained roof damage, some of which had a considerable amount of their roof tiles removed and 2 that had their entire roofs ripped off. Trees, signs, and fences were downed, and a crane at a construction site collapsed. Dozens of cars were damaged by flying debris as well. One person was injured and multiple families were displaced from their homes. Additionally, an IF0.5 tornado touched down in Tece, Mersin Province, Turkey, damaging trees.

=== February 21 (Indonesia) ===
A tornado caused significant damage and was caught on video from multiple angles as it struck Rancaekek, Bandung Regency and parts of Sumedang Regency. It injured 22 people and damaged or destroyed more than 500 structures. Large trucks were overturned and trees were blown over as well. The tornado was given a rating of F2 on the Fujita scale, making it the strongest rated tornado to strike Indonesia.

=== February 22 (Brazil) ===
A rare northern Brazil tornado hit Estrela de Alagoas, Alagoas. According to MetSul Meteorologia, the damage caused by the tornado was rated F1.

=== February 27–28 (United States) ===
EFU	EF0	EF1	EF2	EF3	EF4	EF5
1	7	12	4	0	0	0

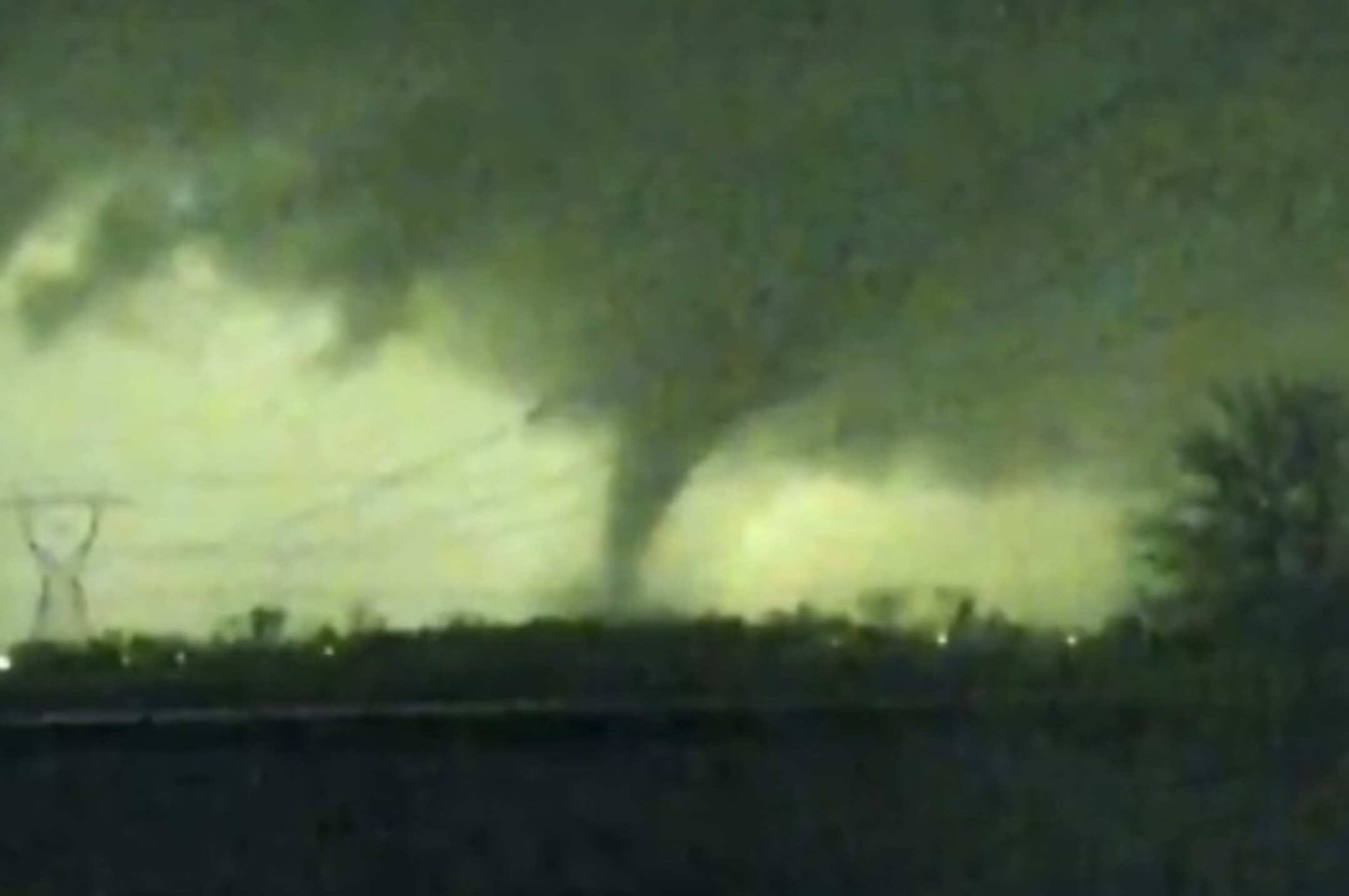
A security camera still of an EF1 tornado near Lilly Chapel, Ohio on February 27.

A severe weather outbreak produced numerous tornadoes across the Great Lakes and Ohio Valley regions in late February. The Storm Prediction Center outlined two separate enhanced risk areas on February 27; one in northern Illinois, and the other along the Ohio River. Severe storms developed later that evening and moved through the Chicago metropolitan area, producing straight-line wind damage and multiple EF0 and EF1 tornadoes throughout the region, including three parallel tornadoes that moved in tandem through the towns of Inverness, Hoffman Estates, Palatine, and South Barrington. Both the O'Hare and Midway International Airports issued ground stops as the system moved through the area, and travelers were encouraged to seek shelter in interior locations and in underground tunnels. In Michigan, a low-end EF2 tornado struck Grand Blanc, where warehouses were significantly damaged at an industrial park, trees and power poles were snapped, and gas leaks were reported. The storms moved into Ohio during the early morning hours of February 28, producing several tornadoes in and around the Dayton and Columbus metro areas. An EF1 tornado moved through the Dayton suburbs of Riverside and Fairborn, damaging airplanes and a hangar at Wright-Patterson Air Force Base, before damaging apartment buildings and trees near Wright State University. A high-end EF2 tornado severely damaged or destroyed multiple homes and unroofed a church as it passed near Springfield, then destroyed a hangar and tossed small planes at the Madison County Airport near London. In southeastern Ohio, two EF2 tornadoes damaged multiple houses and destroyed outbuildings near Gahanna and Miltonsburg. Overall, a total of 24 tornadoes were confirmed as a result of this outbreak, which resulted in three injuries.

== March ==
=== March 5 (Turkey and France) ===
IFU	IF0	IF0.5	IF1	IF1.5	IF2	IF2.5	IF3	IF4	IF5
0	0	0	5	1	0	0	0	0	0

Several tornadoes and waterspouts touched down in Europe. One waterspout hit Demre, Turkey, causing IF1 damage to 175 decares of greenhouses and electricity poles. A second IF1 tornado affected Göksu, Hacıveliler, Yenimahalle, Kumluca and Toptaş in Antalya Province, along a 12 km long and 80 meter wide path. Weak greenhouses were damaged, a mobile construction trailer was shifted, roofs were damaged and trees were downed. Six people sustained injuries. Another IF1 tornado hit Payallar, causing near complete destruction of a weak greenhouse facility, and tossing a container into the greenhouse facility, causing one injury. A total of three people were injured. Three tornadoes EF1 touched down in southwestern France, one in Villeneuve-sur-Lot, one in Fauroux, and one in Cahors.

=== March 9 (Spain) ===
IFU	IF0	IF0.5	IF1	IF1.5	IF2	IF2.5	IF3	IF4	IF5
0	0	0	0	1	1	0	0	0	0

An IF2 rated tornado struck the city of Córdoba during the early hours of the night. Wind speeds are calculated to be around 200 km/h and several structures sustained light to severe damage. No fatalities or injuries were reported. Another IF1.5 struck the thermosolar plant in the nearby town of Posadas.

=== March 9 (United States) ===
EFU	EF0	EF1	EF2	EF3	EF4	EF5
0	0	3	1	0	0	0

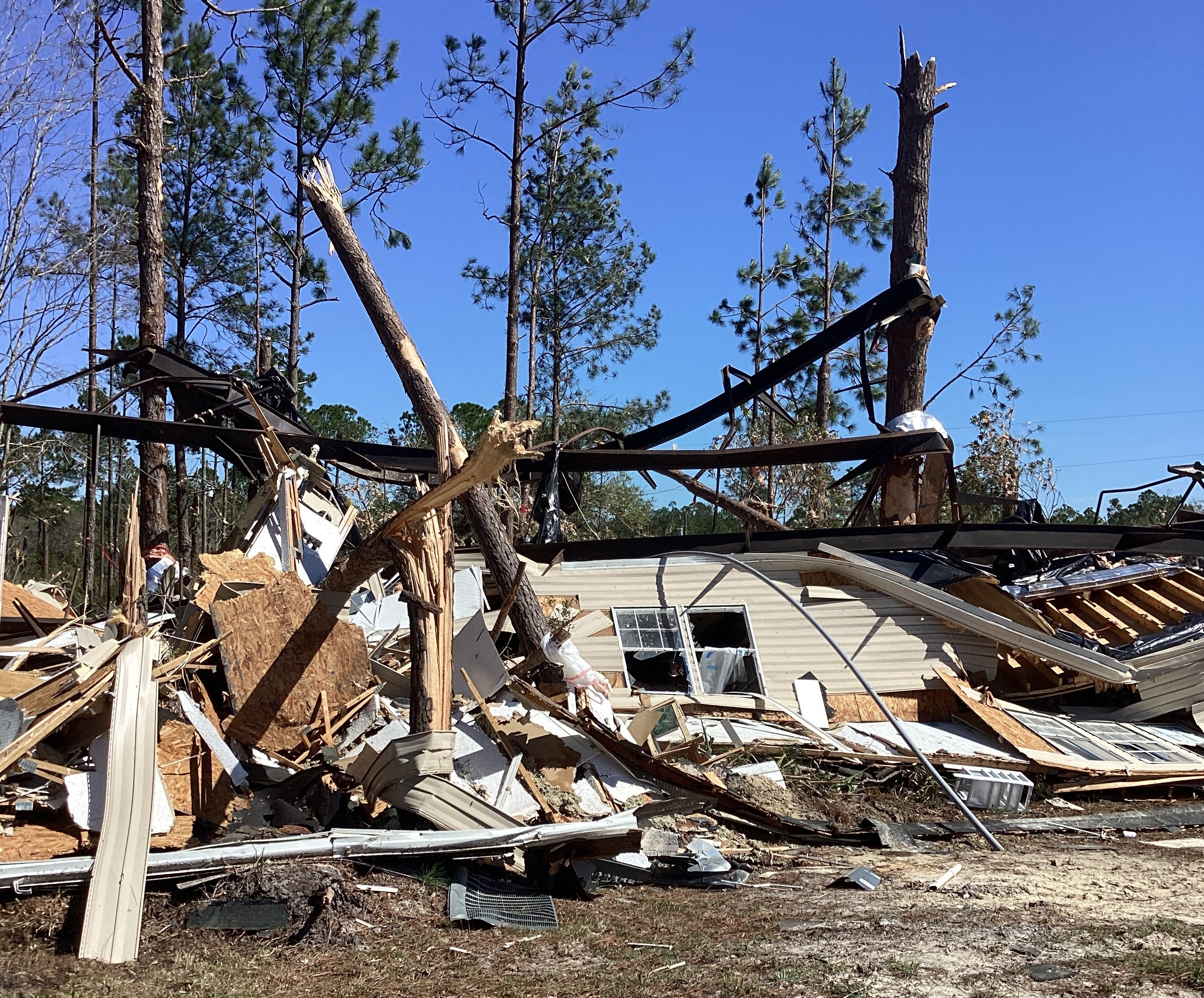
A manufactured home destroyed by the Nahunta, Georgia EF2 tornado.

A small severe weather event impacted the states of Alabama, Georgia, and Florida, producing multiple tornadoes. In the early morning hours, a high-end EF1 tornado touched down east of Ozark, Alabama, causing tree damage and impacting several homes and outbuildings. Later that morning, another EF1 tornado occurred north of Miccosukee, Florida, resulting in tree damage only. Another tornado formed northeast of Argyle, Georgia, damaging two structures and numerous trees and receiving a rating of EF1. During the early afternoon, a significant tornado touched down southeast of Nahunta, Georgia. This tornado caused significant damage, including the roof of a home being severely damaged and the destruction of a travel trailer. Additionally, a double-wide manufactured home was completely destroyed, with its undercarriage thrown into trees and bent. Five people sustained injuries, and the tornado received a high-end EF2 rating, with wind speeds up to 130 mph (210 km/h). In total, four tornadoes were confirmed during this event.

=== March 13–15 (United States) ===
EFU	EF0	EF1	EF2	EF3	EF4	EF5
2	12	11	7	2	0	0

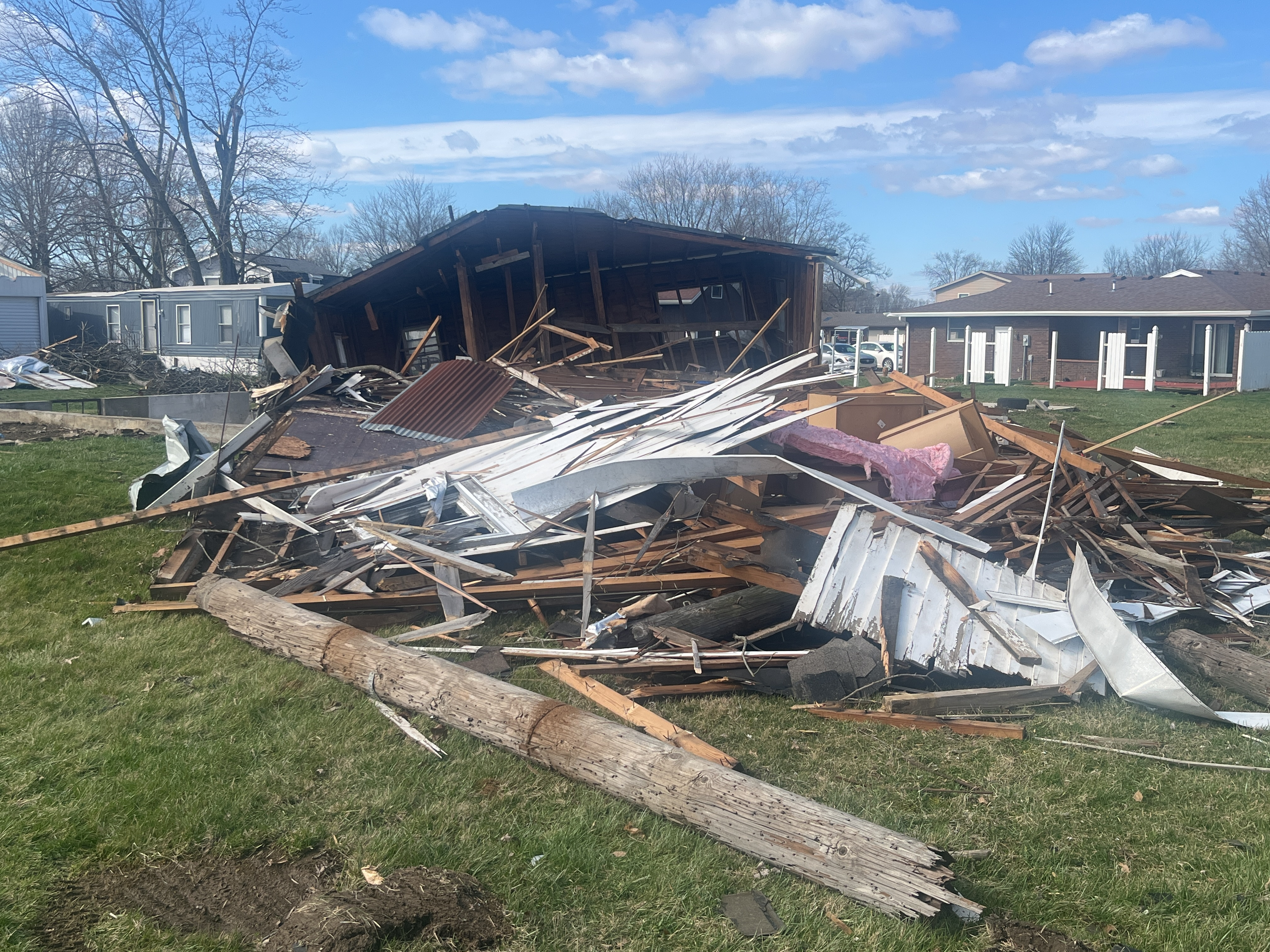
A home that was heavily damaged at EF2 intensity in Selma, Indiana.

From the evening of March 13 through March 15, a severe weather and tornado outbreak impacted the Central, Midwestern, and Southern United States. On March 13, the Storm Prediction Center issued an enhanced risk for severe weather across Kansas and Missouri. Two tornadoes touched down that day in Kansas, near Alta Vista and Rossville, both of which caused EF2 damage. On March 14, the Storm Prediction Center issued another enhanced risk area for parts of Texas, Oklahoma, Arkansas, and Missouri, including a 10% risk area for tornadoes. However, the most intense supercells formed northeast of that area in the Ohio Valley. That afternoon, a low-end EF2 tornado touched down in Hanover, Indiana, tearing the roofs off a few homes, before crossing into Kentucky and striking the town of Milton, destroying numerous trailers and causing damage to many homes. The tornado then re-entered Indiana and destroyed more trailers near Brooksburg before lifting. Two people were injured by this tornado. That evening, a long-tracked supercell produced numerous tornadoes in Indiana and Ohio. The first tornado spawned by this supercell was a brief EF1 tornado near Celina, before another EF1 tornado directly struck Celina and the nearby community of St Marys. The supercell then spawned a multiple-vortex, high-end EF3 tornado that impacted the towns of Wapakoneta and Lakeview, destroying manufactured homes, uprooting and partially debarking trees, and obliterating RVs at a trailer park where a site-built structure was also destroyed. Three people were killed, and 26 others were injured by this tornado. Shortly thereafter, a separate supercell to the north of the Lakeview supercell produced an EF2 tornado that completely destroyed a manufactured home and damaged trees, homes, and outbuildings near Plymouth. After the Lakeview EF3 tornado dissipated, the storm produced an EF2 tornado that caused major damage to homes, outbuildings, and trees as it passed near Raymond, through Broadway, and near Ostrander. The final tornado from the Lakeview supercell was a long-tracked EF1 tornado that passed near Delaware, Sunbury, Galena, and St. Louisville. Just south of the Lakeview supercell, another supercell spawned an EF2 tornado that impacted Selma, Indiana. Later, the storm spawned another strong tornado near Farmland, Indiana, which tore the roofs off numerous homes as it moved eastward. The tornado then struck Winchester at high-end EF3 intensity, destroying many homes, a church, and a Taco Bell restaurant. The tornado then crossed the border into Ohio, causing EF1-EF2 damage to farmsteads as it moved through Darke and Miami counties before dissipating near Bradford. The tornado injured 40 people with one person dying from their injuries about a month later. Further south, a low-end EF2 tornado destroyed a metal structure and snapped many trees in Hot Springs Village, Arkansas as well. Only isolated, weak tornadic activity occurred on March 15 before the outbreak came to an end. In total, 34 tornadoes were confirmed from this outbreak along with four fatalities and 69 injuries.

=== March 19 (Argentina) ===
EFU	EF0	EF1	EF2	EF3	EF4	EF5
0	1	3	2	0	0	0

On Tuesday, March 19, 2024 in Buenos Aires, Argentina, 2 tornadoes occurred in the district of Nueve de Julio followed by 4 other tornadoes in the district of Bragado, the most intense one recorded was the tornado that hit the town of Olascoaga [es] in the district of Bragado, It caused severe damage to silos, agricultural vehicles, homes and sheds located in the area, corresponding to those of a low-end EF2 tornado with winds that were recorded at up to 180 km/h (112 mph) although it is suspected that it may have actually generated winds of up to 200 km/h (124 mph).

It moved at least 12 km from the west - northwest of Olascoaga to the east - southeast passing near and north of the town of Comodoro Py [es] also located in the district of Bragado. At first it was believed that this was the only tornado produced, but days later in a preliminary report of the meteorological expertise made by meteorological observers Mauricio Senessi and Lucas Buscalia, confirmed that the phenomenon occurred previously further south, in the district and city of Nueve de Julio, It was also a tornado, which moved almost parallel to the subsequent Olascoaga-Comodoro Py tornado, also causing significant damage in the town of Nueve de Julio, destroying a racetrack east of that city and severely damaging several houses along the city.

But then, more than a month after the tornado event that affected the districts of Bragado and Nueve de Julio, the same observers of the meteorological expertise together with 2 other collaborators (contributing between them 2 a vehicle and stay to the meteorological observers) toured together both districts, concluding that day there were a total of 6 tornadoes between the districts of Bragado and Nueve de Julio:

It is not known if the tornadoes were caused by the same long-track supercell in a tornado family or by several contiguous supercells in a multicellular thunderstorm. And although it is known that both the Olascoaga tornado and the one that affected the city of Nueve de Julio, generated winds between 110 - 124 mph and could be classified as EF2, the exact intensity of the other four tornadoes varies between EF0 and EF1.

=== March 21 (Brazil) ===
In the early hours of Thursday, March 21, 2024, a tornado occurred in the municipality of São Sepé, Rio Grande do Sul. A house in the rural area of the municipality of São Sepé was completely destroyed and moved from its foundation. After a more careful analysis of the damage, meteorologists from the Federal University of Santa Maria (UFSM) confirmed the phenomenon as an EF2 tornado.

=== March 27 (Italy and France) ===
IFU	IF0	IF0.5	IF1	IF1.5	IF2	IF2.5	IF3	IF4	IF5
1	0	0	0	0	1	0	0	0	0

A weak unrated tornado occurred just north-east of downtown Verona, Italy within the north-eastern suburb of Borgo Venezia. Another IF2 tornado hit Port-Joinville, France, damaging 60 roofs and downing trees. One person sustained injuries.

=== March 31 (India) ===
A tornado, accompanied by a nor'wester, struck the city of Jalpaiguri, West Bengal, killing five people and injuring over 100 others. More than 100 houses were destroyed by the tornado.

=== March 31 (China) ===
An EF2 tornado was confirmed from an overnight extreme QLCS event in Nanchang, Jiangxi Province. The tornado sucked three people out of high-rise buildings and caused four fatalities in total.

== April ==
=== April 1–3 (United States) ===
EFU	EF0	EF1	EF2	EF3	EF4	EF5
1	19	52	14	0	0	0

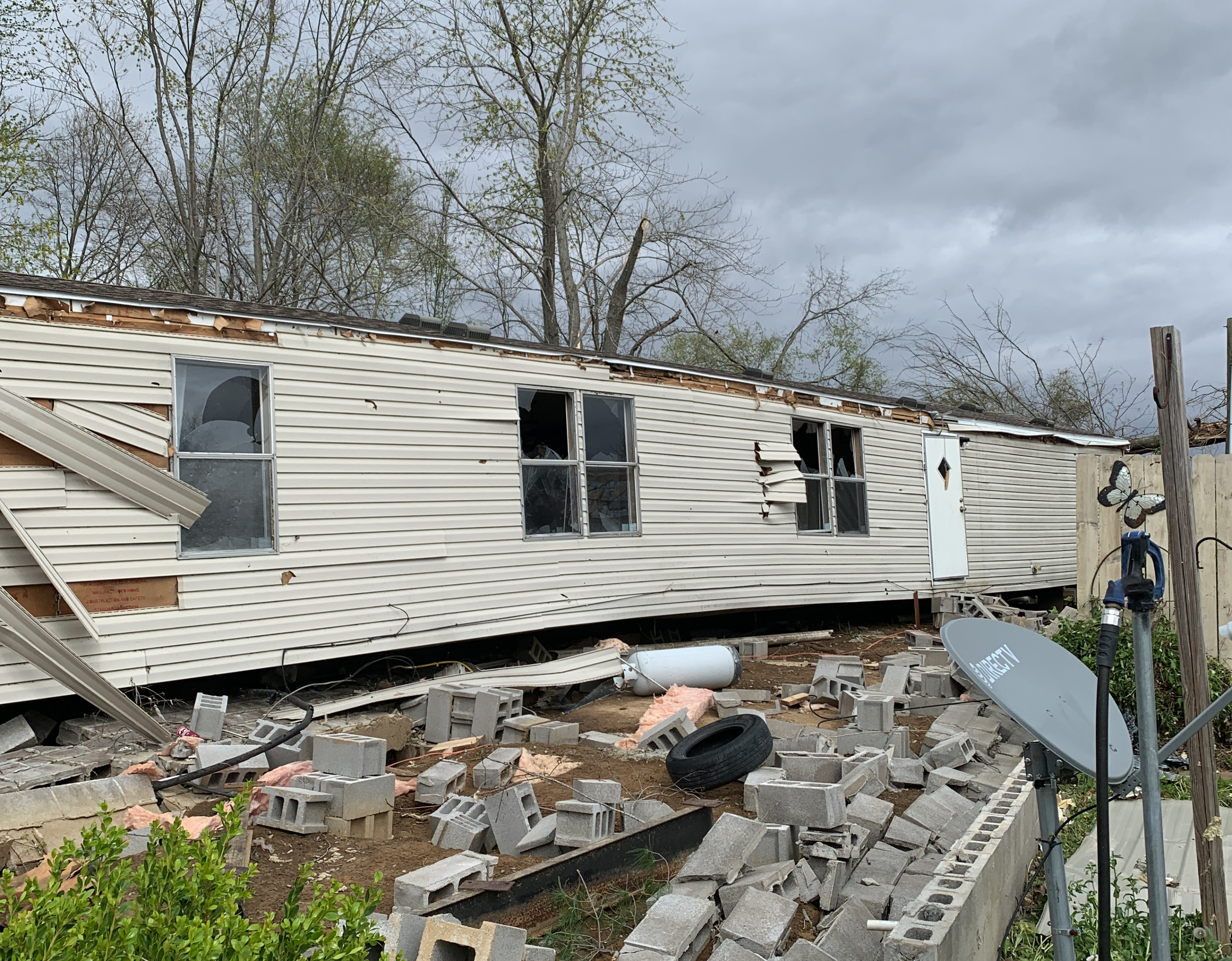
A manufactured home slid off its foundation by the Eldorado, Illinois EF2 tornado.

From April 1 through April 3, a derecho and significant tornado outbreak occurred primarily in the Central Plains, Mississippi Valley, Ohio Valley, and Mid-Atlantic. On April 1, a moderate risk for severe weather was issued across parts of Oklahoma and Texas, including a 10% hatched area for tornadoes. On April 1, several weak tornadoes occurred across Oklahoma, Arkansas, and Missouri, including an EF0 tornado that overturned a tractor trailer near Lenapah. Two non-tornadic injuries were reported due to high winds toppling trees in Kentucky and Indiana. Tornadic activity continued into the early morning hours of April 2 across the Ohio River Valley. An EF2 tornado touched down near Lake of Egypt, Illinois, downing numerous trees, power lines, and causing damage to a few outbuildings. Another EF2 tornado damaged a metal building and rolled a mobile home near Eldorado, injuring two people. An EF2 tornado caused considerable damage to several buildings near Uniontown in Kentucky. EF2 tornadoes also impacted the towns of New Harmony and Cynthiana in Indiana. On the afternoon of April 2, an EF2 tornado downed numerous trees and damaged the roof of a home in Cannonsburg, Kentucky. Hundreds of hardwood trees were downed by an EF2 tornado near Fayetteville, West Virginia. Another EF2 tornado damaged several homes in Jeffersonville, Indiana before crossing the Ohio River and striking Prospect, Kentucky resulting in 22 injuries. Further south in Georgia, an EF2 tornado struck the city of Conyers, causing considerable damage and two injuries. In total, 86 tornadoes were confirmed causing over 37 injuries.

Widespread flooding occurred as a part of the storm system, with hourly rainfall rates of 1.5 in (38 mm) in Tulsa, Oklahoma on April 1. Severe storms across the Northeastern United States on April 3 produced a daily rainfall record of 1.75 in (44 mm) of precipitation at LaGuardia Airport in New York City. The storm system left roughly 123,000 customers without power in West Virginia. While no tornado-related fatalities occurred, at least five people were killed as a result of the storm system and several others were injured.

=== April 9–11 (United States) ===
EFU	EF0	EF1	EF2	EF3	EF4	EF5
0	6	26	5	0	0	0

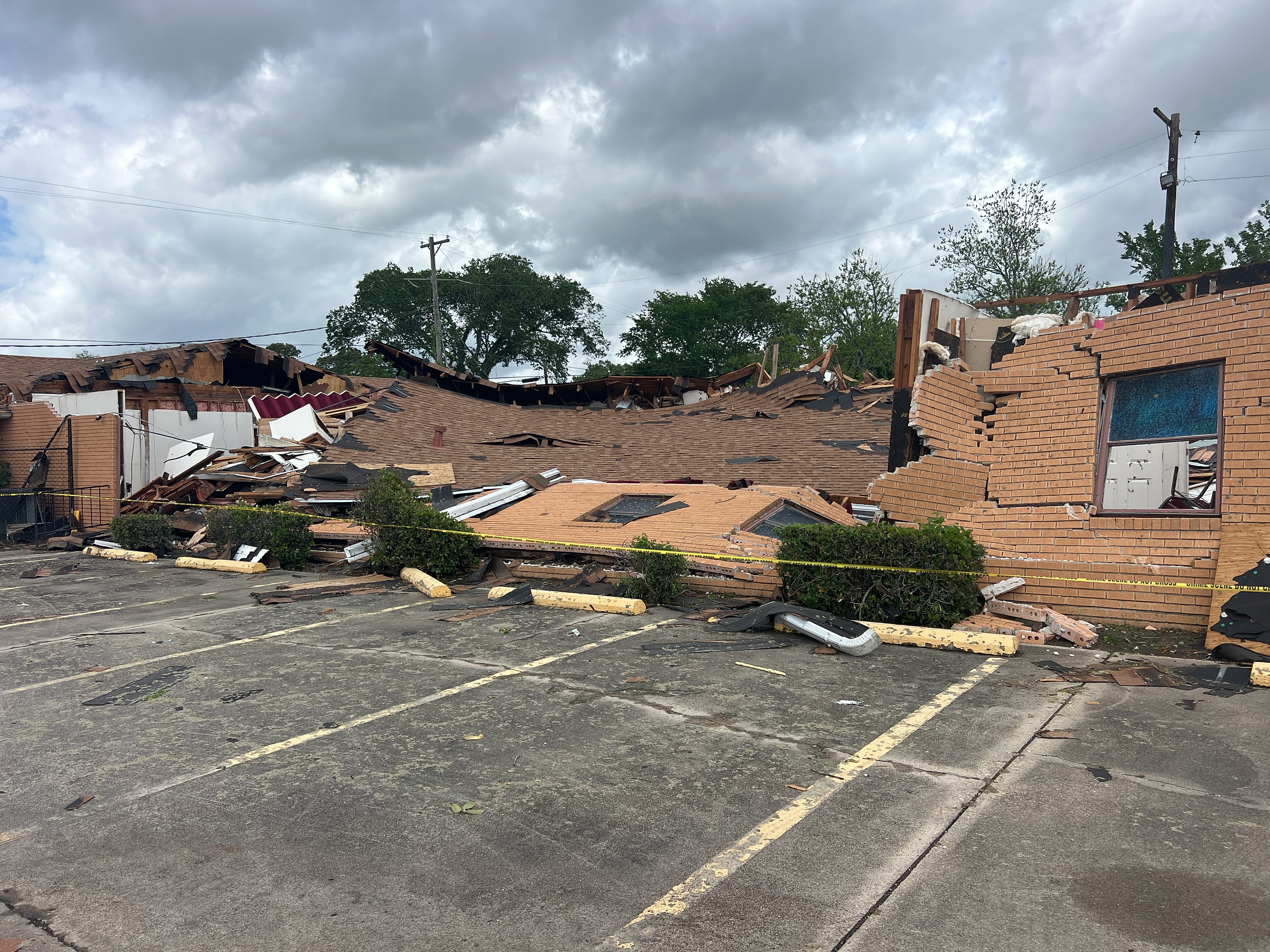
EF2 damage to a church in Port Arthur, Texas.

A small severe weather outbreak produced numerous tornadoes along the Gulf Coast. On April 9, the Storm Prediction Center issued an enhanced risk for severe weather from Central Texas through western Louisiana, including a 10% risk for tornadoes. On April 10, the Storm Prediction Center issued a moderate risk for south-central Louisiana into southern Mississippi, with a 15% risk for strong tornadoes. During the very early morning of April 10, a squall line produced a brief EF1 tornado in Katy, Texas and another, stronger EF2 tornado in downtown Port Arthur. Afterwards, a quasi-linear convective system (QLCS) formed in eastern Texas, producing twin EF1 tornadoes south of Lake Charles and a damaging EF2 tornado near McNeese State University. The final significant tornado of the outbreak touched down near Lake Pontchartrain, causing EF2 damage on the southern side of Slidell and injuring several people in the area before it dissipated northwest of Pearlington as the tornado was absorbed by an EF1 tornado that moved through Northern Slidell before occluding into Stennis Space Center. Simultaneously, a long-track high-end EF1 tornado touched down in the southern side of Pearl River before striking Gainesville, Mississippi and the Stennis Space Center, causing moderate damage. In addition to the tornadoes that day, flooding near Pittsburgh led to a flash flood emergency. In total, 37 tornadoes were confirmed from the outbreak, with no fatalities and several injuries, as well as $1.5 billion in damages.

=== April 16–18 (United States) ===
EFU	EF0	EF1	EF2	EF3	EF4	EF5
7	22	19	2	0	0	0

A moderately severe weather outbreak produced numerous tornadoes across the Central Plains into the Midwest. On April 15, the Storm Prediction Center issued an enhanced risk into Kansas, Nebraska and South Dakota, with a 10% hatched tornado risk. On the morning of April 16, multiple supercells from the previous day produced several tornadoes across Iowa and Missouri. A long-lived EF1 tornado passed through the southeastern side of Eureka, Kansas, causing significant damage to barns. After this tornado dissipated, a supercell to the north produced three weak but long-tracked tornadoes southwest of Overbrook. The same cell produced a stronger EF2 tornado south of Virgil, which caused significant damage to barns and telephone poles. Later that morning, another enhanced risk was issued for Iowa, Illinois, and Missouri, with an additional 30% hatched risk for large hail. Only weak tornadoes touched down for most of the day, but the final one that day was a long-tracked, high-end EF2 tornado that touched down near Houghton before moving through rural areas near New London. This strong tornado, which was the strongest of the outbreak, caused severe damage at several houses' farmsteads near Yarmouth and uprooted numerous trees at Port Louisa National Wildlife Refuge before dissipating near Toolesboro. Weak tornadoes occurred over the next two days before the outbreak ended. In total, 50 tornadoes were confirmed from this outbreak, causing no injuries or fatalities.

=== April 20 (Alaska) ===
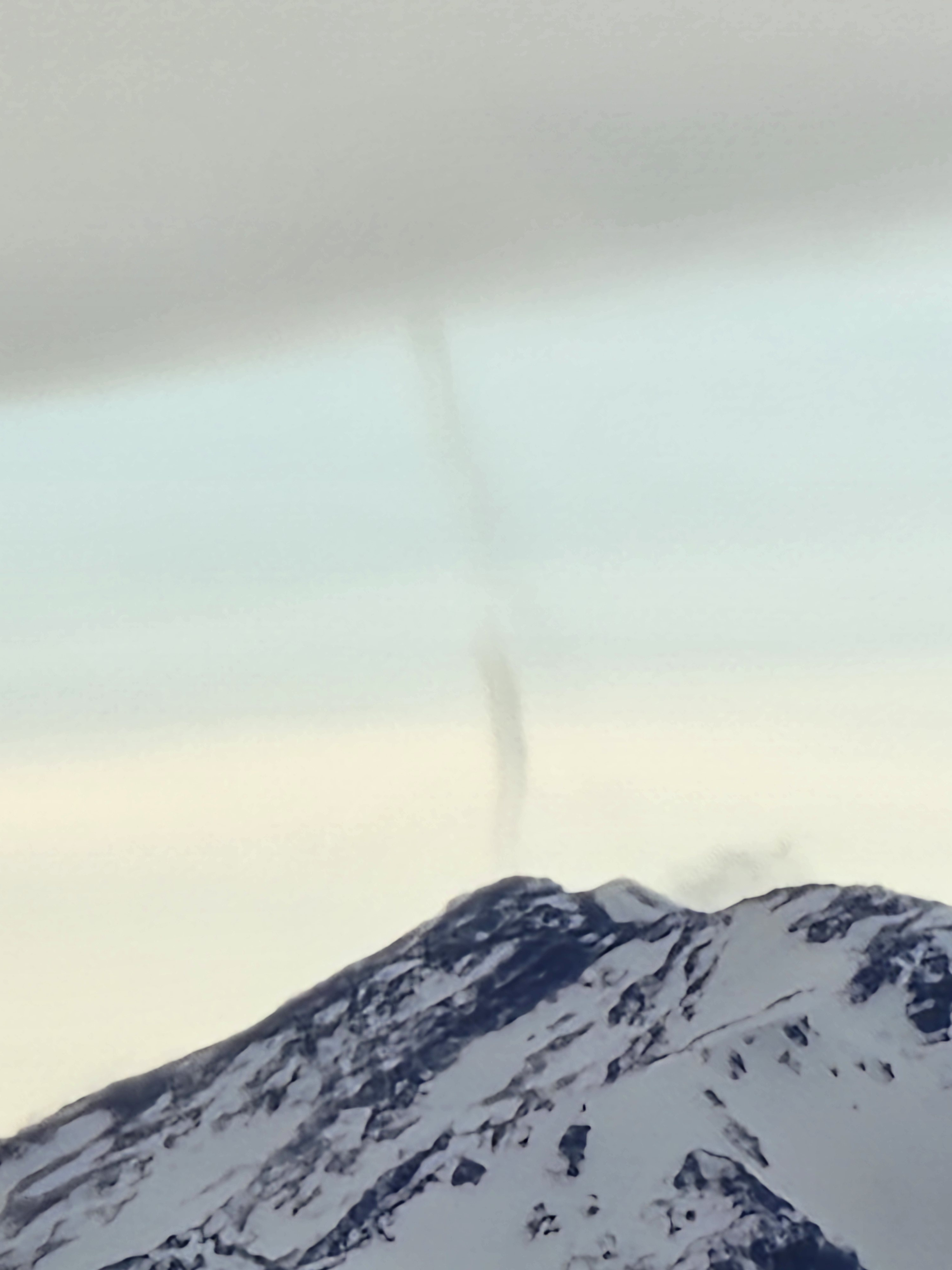
A landspout tornado over Rusty Point, Alaska.

A very rare EF0 tornado occurred near Rusty Point, just outside of Anchorage, Alaska, marking the fifth officially recorded tornado to occur in the state. It remained over remote areas and caused no damage. This was the first Alaskan tornado recorded since 2005.

=== April 25–28 (United States) ===
EFU	EF0	EF1	EF2	EF3	EF4	EF5
32	42	66	16	7	2	0

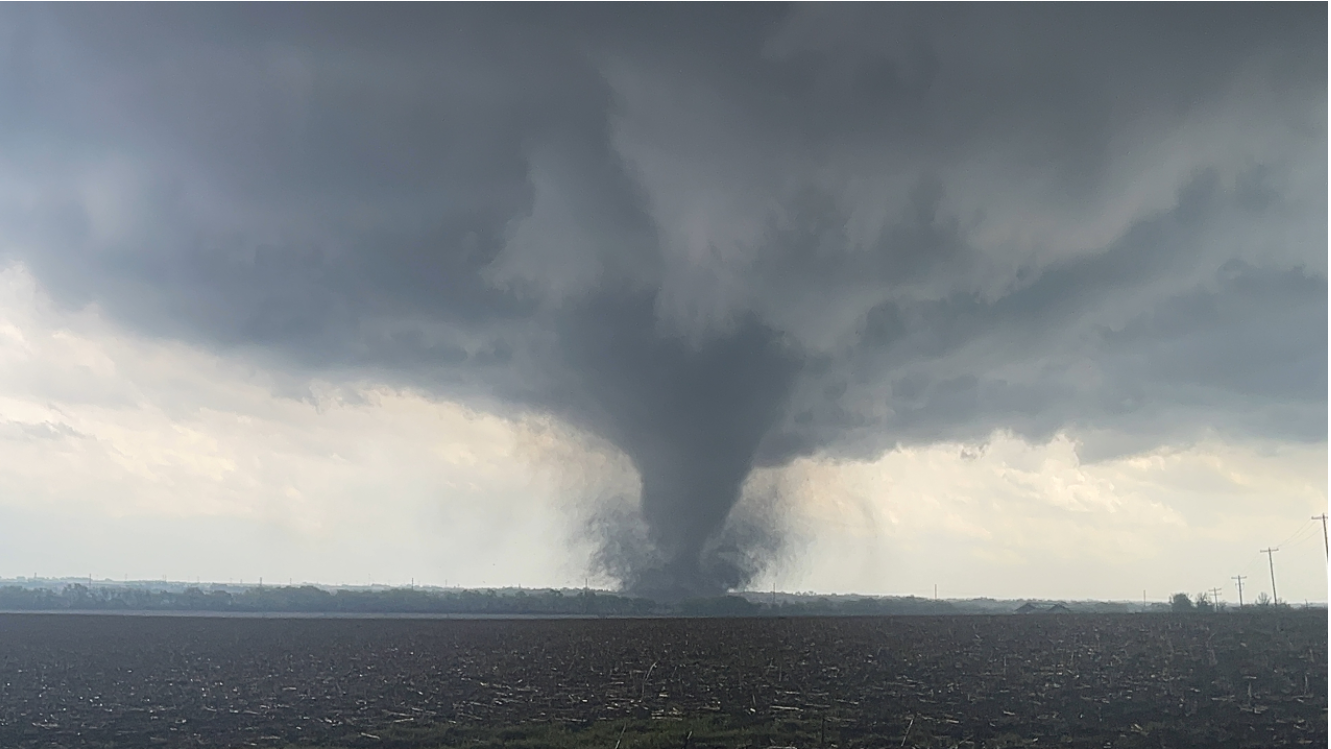
An EF3 tornado near Lincoln, Nebraska on April 26.

A devastating tornado outbreak occurred across the central United States at the end of April. On April 26, several lines of supercells impacted eastern Nebraska and western and central Iowa, producing widespread tornado damage. A large EF3 wedge tornado passed near Elba, Nebraska, causing major damage at a farmstead. Shortly after, a cyclic supercell produced a large EF3 tornado near Lincoln, Nebraska that struck an industrial building while 70 people were inside, resulting in the building's collapse and at least three non-fatal injuries. The tornado then derailed a BNSF freight train and crossed I-80 before dissipating. After spawning some weak, short-lived tornadoes, the same storm produced a very large, violent low-end EF4 wedge tornado that touched down near Yutan, Nebraska and tracked through the northwestern Omaha metropolitan area and near Blair, prompting a tornado emergency. Significant damage was observed in Elkhorn from the tornado, with multiple homes being leveled and swept away with many other homes sustaining loss of roofs and collapsed walls. More than 100 homes were destroyed and four people were injured. The Omaha Public Power District reported that the tornado outbreak left more than 10,000 homes without power, though half of those affected had power return by the following morning. Later, another storm produced an EF3 tornado that was documented by multiple surveillance cameras while passing through the west side of Council Bluffs, Iowa. The tornado then crossed the Missouri River and struck Omaha, Nebraska's airport, Eppley Airfield, damaging or destroying several general aviation buildings. The tornado then crossed back over the Missouri River and reached its peak intensity near Crescent, Iowa, destroying a home. The tornado continued to cause damage before dissipating near Beebeetown. Another long-tracked, very large high-end EF3 tornado struck Minden, prompting another tornado emergency. An estimated 40–50 homes were destroyed in Minden, where one person was killed and three others were injured. The tornado also caused damage near Tennant, Harlan, and Defiance before dissipating. That night, an EF2 tornado prompted another PDS warning for Pleasant Hill southeast of Des Moines. Major damage to homes occurred and one person was injured.

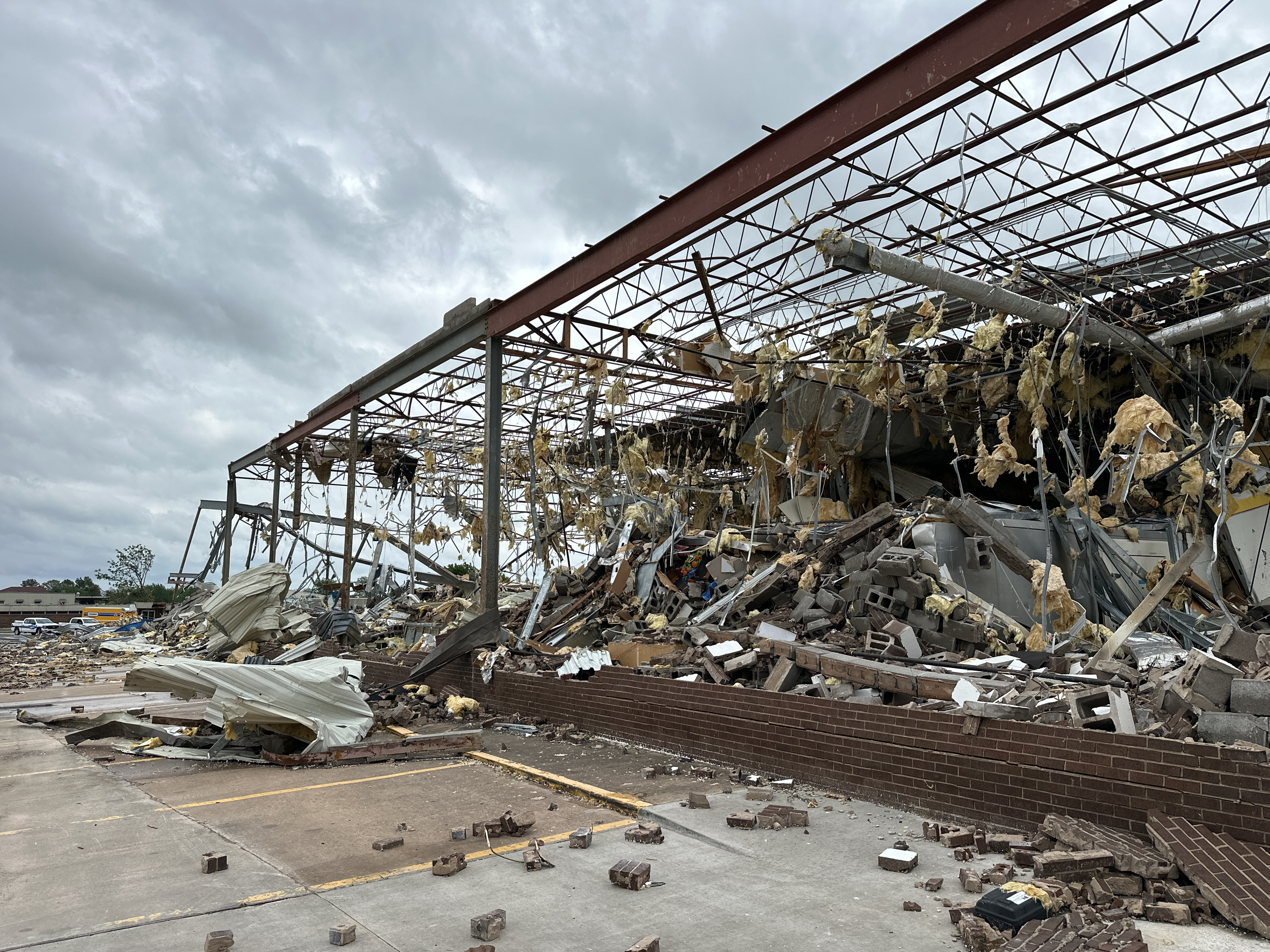
Low-end EF4 tornado damage to a Homeland Grocery Store in Marietta, Oklahoma.

The next day, another major outbreak broke out across parts of Texas, Oklahoma, Kansas, and Missouri. The strongest tornadoes struck Southern Oklahoma during the nighttime hours after a line of strong supercells developed in front of a squall line. A high-end EF3 tornado struck Sulphur, severely damaging or destroying homes and killing one person. Later, another EF3 tornado passed through or near Spaulding, Holdenville, and Bearden, causing major damage and killing two people. Another large, violent EF4 tornado struck Marietta, causing major damage to a Dollar Tree distribution center, and killing one person. The next day, multiple tornadoes struck eastern Texas and southeastern Oklahoma. Although all the tornadoes were weak, one brief EF1 tornado impacted a subdivision of Trinity, Texas, destroying a mobile home. Both occupants were injured, with one of them later dying from his injuries. The tornado also damaged trees and vehicles. Overall, 165 tornadoes, six fatalities, and more than 150 injuries were confirmed during the outbreak.

=== April 27 (China) ===
A significant tornado moved through several villages in the Baiyun District of Guangzhou, killing five people, and injuring dozens of others. More than 140 factory buildings sustained a certain degree of damage.

=== April 30 – May 4 (United States) ===
EFU	EF0	EF1	EF2	EF3	EF4	EF5
20	11	12	5	3	0	0

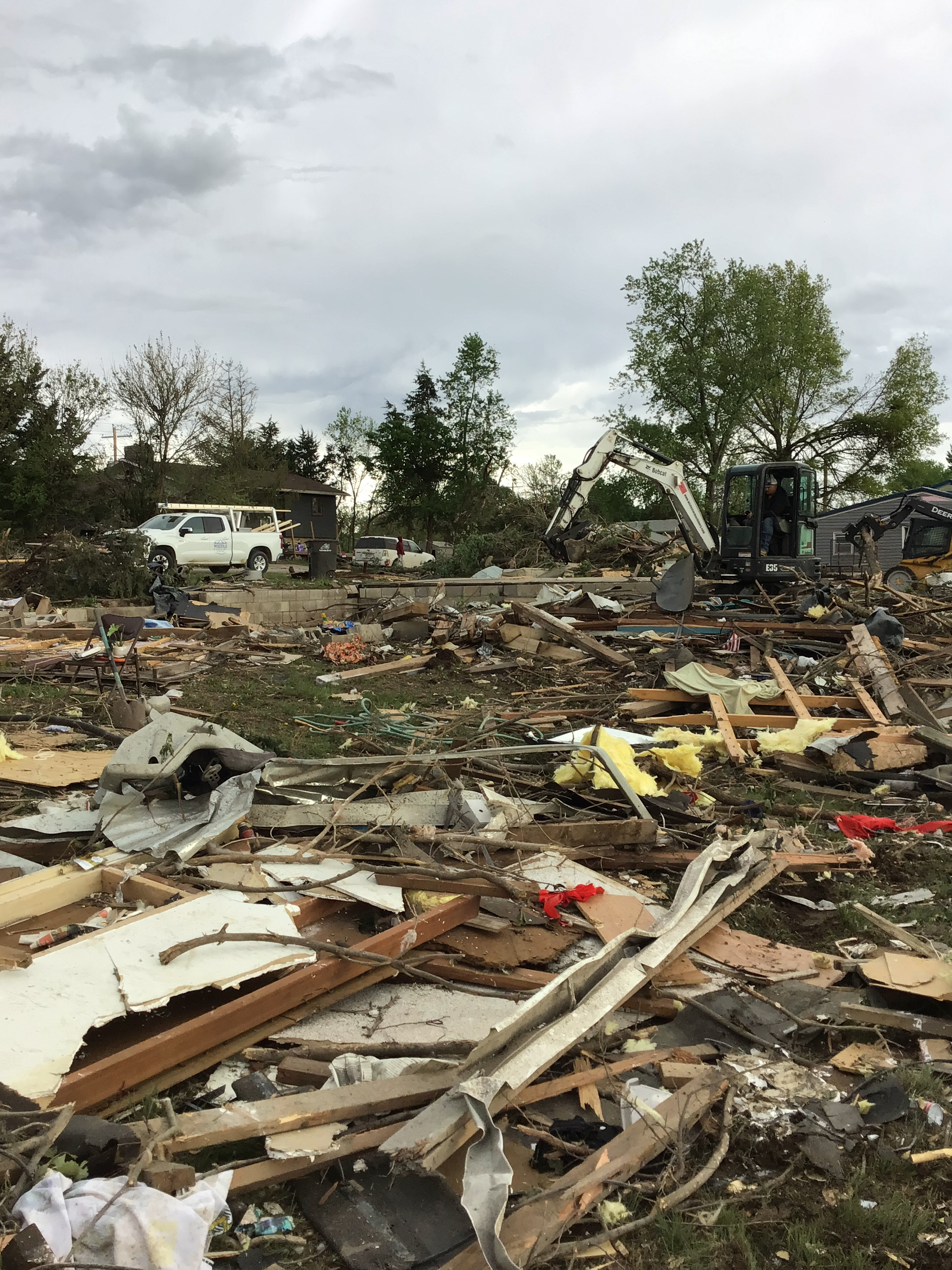
A poorly constructed home destroyed at low-end EF3 intensity in Westmoreland, Kansas.

3D NEXRAD velocity scans showing the tornadogenesis of an EF1 tornado near Hollister, Oklahoma.

On April 30, the Storm Prediction Center issued an Enhanced risk for severe weather in the states of Kansas, Missouri, and Nebraska, including a 5% risk for tornadoes. During the mid-afternoon, a low-precipitation supercell spawned an intense, multiple-vortex tornado that struck Westmoreland, Kansas, causing extensive damage to homes and businesses. Two poorly constructed frame homes were destroyed, and as a result, a low-end EF3 rating was applied, with wind speeds estimated at 140 mph (230 km/h). One fatality occurred in a destroyed mobile home as well. A tornado struck south of Vermillion, Kansas, heavily damaging one home at high-end EF1 intensity. In the early evening, a high-end EF1 tornado directly struck New Cordell, Oklahoma, damaging numerous homes and businesses. Later in the evening, a powerful supercell displayed an intense tornado vortex signature east of Hollister, Oklahoma. Given this tornado occurred in a rural area, the lack of damage indicators for it to hit led to a high-end EF1 rating. The tornado is believed to have been much more powerful than EF1 intensity, and has been described as "one of the most powerful tornadoes ever to occur" by Oklahoma Country station KLAW, as well as certain meteorologists and storm chasers. The same supercell spawned an anticyclonic EF1 tornado southeast of Loveland, which was also believed to be more powerful than EF1 intensity in contrast to most anti-cyclonic tornadoes, which are typically much weaker. An analysis of the Hollister and Loveland tornadoes by forecaster Trey Greenwood indicated that the Hollister tornado could have likely produced damage up to EF3 intensity, but stated that it was unlikely to have been a violent (EF4+) tornado, whereas the Loveland satellite tornado may have approached the intensity of the parent Hollister tornado and likely produced wind speeds in the range of 95–140 mph (153–225 km/h) while exhibiting a reversed hook echo.

On May 1, multiple weak tornadoes touched down in and around Spearman, Texas; an unrelated rare EF0 tornado also occurred in Puerto Rico. On May 2, the Storm Prediction Center issued an Enhanced risk for severe weather in the state of Texas, with a 5% risk for tornadoes. Numerous tornadoes touched down, the strongest being a "drill bit" high-end EF3 tornado that struck west of Hawley, Texas. Power poles and outbuildings sustained significant damage near the start of its path. As the tornado deviated south, it struck a poorly constructed home, sweeping it clean off its foundation. Another home, more well-constructed, was struck as the tornado continued to move south. All of its walls collapsed, with debris partially swept off the foundation. All four occupants sustained injuries. Vehicles were thrown and severely damaged as well. On May 3, the Storm Prediction Center issued yet another Enhanced risk for severe weather. Several tornadoes touched down throughout the day, including an EF2 tornado south of Silver, Texas and a deviant low-end EF3 wedge tornado south of Robert Lee.

The storms have also been associated with severe flooding in Texas, which resulted in at least 224 people being rescued from their homes and vehicles in Harris County by May 3. BNSF's Fort Worth Subdivision was closed for a few days after severe flooding caused a washout near Clifton; it was later closed again when the first train to go over the line after it reopened derailed. Amtrak's Texas Eagle was forced to operate a bus bridge between San Antonio and Fort Worth, Texas and later between Temple and Fort Worth. Five more tornadoes touched down south of Fort Stockton, Texas on May 4. They generally moved over rural, inaccessible open terrain, but one of them was rated EF2 tornado due to snapping power poles; the others were rated EFU. Another EF2 tornado caused considerable damage on a ranch in Crockett County. One other EFU tornado also occurred in Ohio that day. In all, 51 tornadoes were confirmed.

== May ==
=== May 6–10 (United States) ===
EFU	EF0	EF1	EF2	EF3	EF4	EF5
16	66	80	13	3	1	0

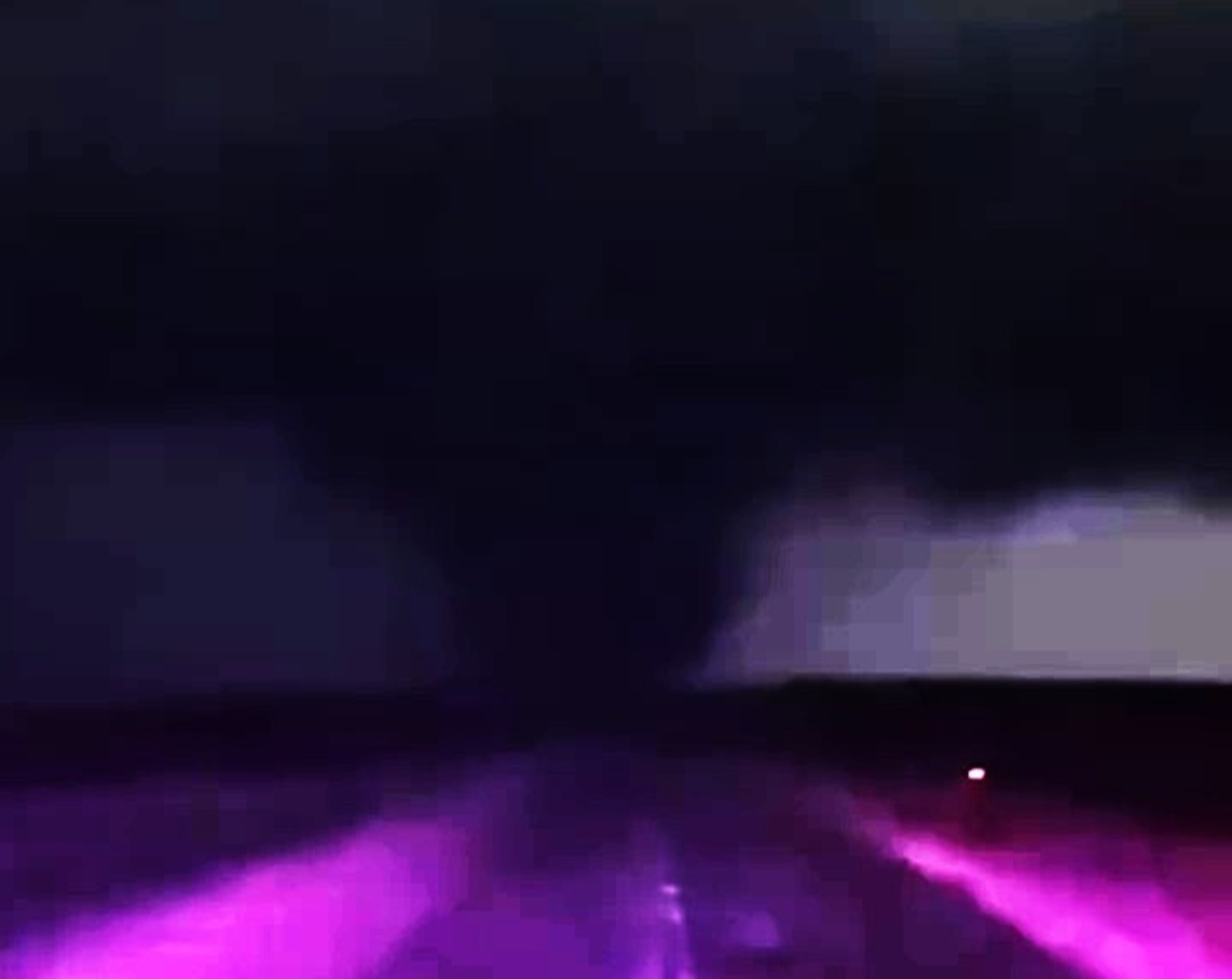
A large EF4 tornado approaching Barnsdall, Oklahoma on May 6.

Another large and deadly tornado outbreak occurred across the Great Plains, Mississippi Valley, and the Ohio Valley from May 6–10. On May 6, a tornado-driven high risk was issued by the Storm Prediction Center across central, north central, and, later, northeastern Oklahoma and south central Kansas, highlighting a 30 percent significant tornado probability over the High Risk area. However, throughout the day, only weak tornadoes occurred across the Plains. A separate system also spawned severe thunderstorms in Tennessee, including one that produced an EF1 tornado that moved through Smithville. Later that night, a powerful supercell spawned a violent EF4 tornado southeast of Hominy, Oklahoma. The tornado moved northeastward and struck the community of Barnsdall, prompting the issuance of a tornado emergency. Two people were killed within the town, and many homes and other structures were heavily damaged or destroyed, including some that were leveled. The tornado continued northeast and moved into Bartlesville, Oklahoma, causing additional severe damage before dissipating northeast of the town. Through the overnight hours into May 7, a squall line produced widespread damaging winds and isolated weak tornadoes across all of Missouri. On May 7, a tornado-driven Enhanced risk was issued across the Ohio Valley by the Storm Prediction Center. That afternoon, a strong, high-end EF2 tornado caused severe damage in Portage, Michigan. Later, a large EF2 tornado along with a satellite EF1 tornado prompted the issuance of a tornado emergency for Union City and Sherwood, the first tornado emergency ever issued in the state of Michigan. Other tornadoes were reported across Michigan along with Ohio, West Virginia, Indiana, Arkansas, and Pennsylvania through the overnight hours into May 8.

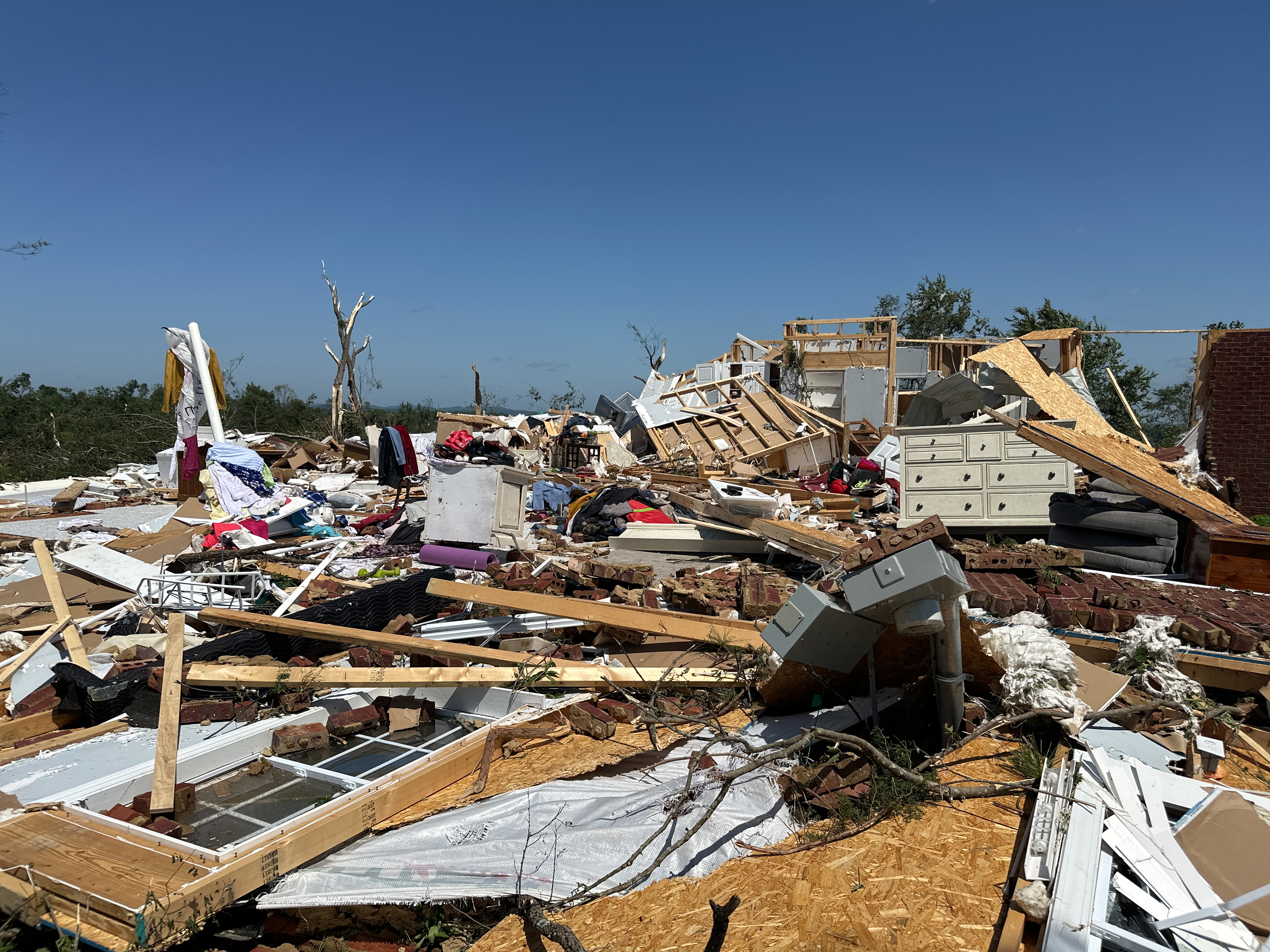
EF3 damage to a house near Columbia, Tennessee.

Later on May 8, more severe weather and tornadoes impacted much of the Middle Mississippi and Tennessee Valleys with many areas experiencing multiple rounds of storms. PDS tornado warnings were issued for EF1 tornadoes near Equality, Illinois and Aurora, Missouri. A tornado emergency was issued for a large, low-end EF3 tornado east of Columbia, Tennessee; a fatality and four injuries have been confirmed with this tornado. Later in the evening, an intense, low-end EF3 tornado crossed Wheeler Lake southeast of Rogersville, Alabama and came ashore in the Bridgadoon subdivision. It damaged several homes, including one large home that sustained significant damage. That night, another PDS tornado warning was issued when the same storm that produced the Brigadoon tornado spawned a strong EF2 tornado in Huntsville, Alabama; the same storm later produced another destructive low-end EF3 tornado that prompted the issuance of another tornado emergency for Henagar, Hammondville, and Mentone. Strong straight-line winds blew a tree down on a car east of Lone Mountain, Tennessee, killing the driver. Severe storms also forced a Major League Baseball game at Busch Stadium to be postponed until August 5. More isolated tornadic activity occurred on May 9, but widespread reports of wind damage and large to very large hail were recorded throughout the Deep South. Through the overnight hours into May 10, a severe MCS moved through the southern Gulf Coast, producing widespread wind damage. The MCS would produce an EF2 tornado northeast of Pensacola, Florida before spawning three large tornadoes that simultaneously impacted Leon County, Florida. The two northern-most tornadoes, which were both rated low-end EF2, moved directly through Tallahassee, inflicting major damage to the downtown area as well as on the campuses of Florida State University and Florida A&M University. The second of these tornadoes also killed two people. To the south of these tornadoes, a swath of significant straight-line winds of around 100 mph (160 km/h) caused damage in the southern part of Tallahassee and points east. The third tornado, which was rated high-end EF1, passed south of Tallahassee, producing widespread tree damage. Tornadic activity then ceased, but severe weather continued to impact the Southeastern United States until the system finally pushed offshore early on May 11. In all, 179 tornadoes, five tornadic fatalities, and three non-tornadic fatalities were confirmed from this outbreak.

=== May 10 (Australia) ===
A tornado struck the town of Bunbury, damaging around 100 homes, including seven that were declared uninhabitable, and injuring two people. Its wind speeds were estimated at over 150 km/h.

=== May 13–14 (United States) ===
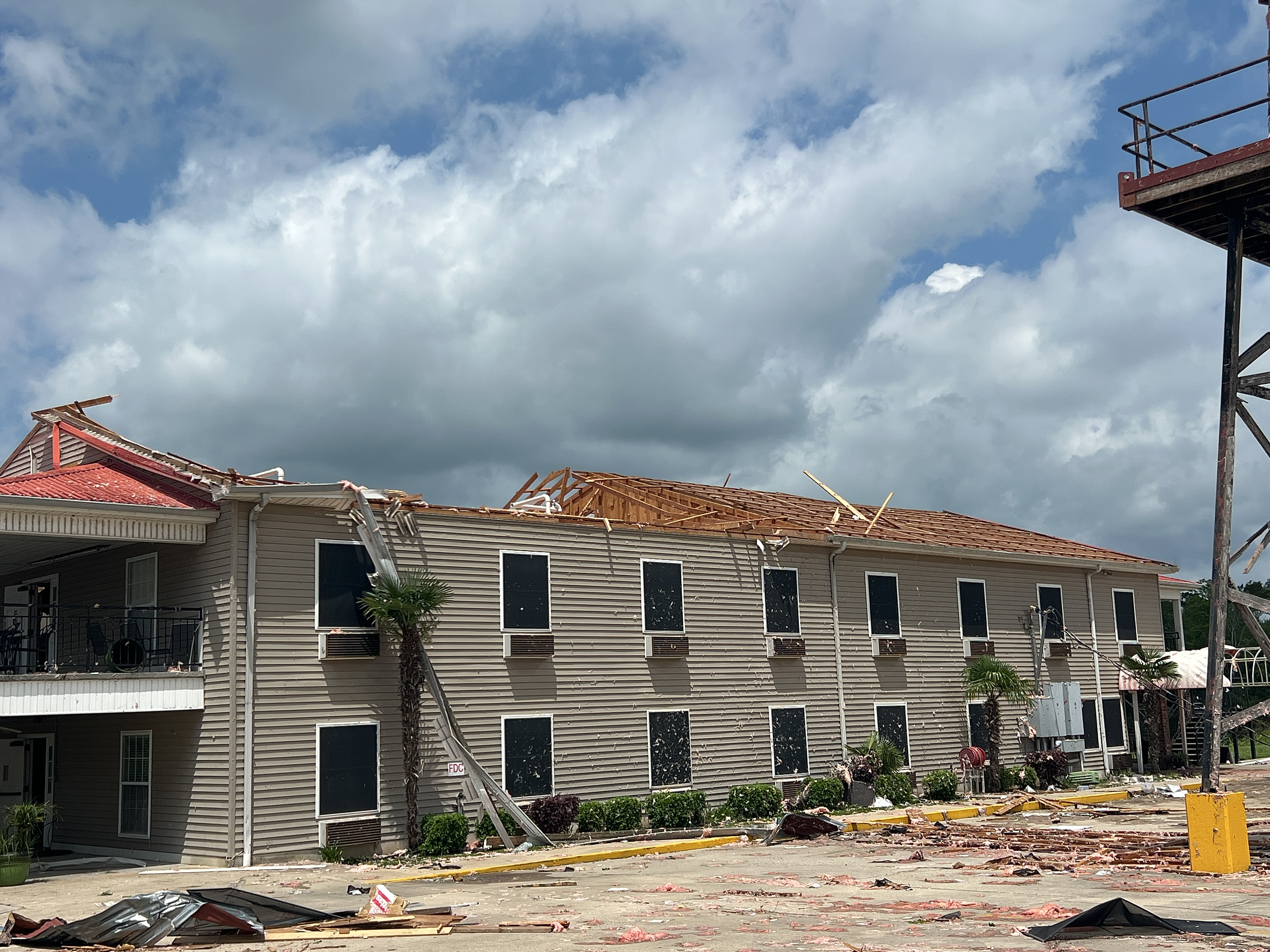
EF2 damage to a hotel in Henderson, Louisiana.

EFU	EF0	EF1	EF2	EF3	EF4	EF5
4	13	7	2	0	0	0

Severe storms produced damaging winds, large hail, and tornadoes across mainly the Gulf Coast. The strongest tornadoes were spawned in association with an MCS that moved through the Acadiana region of Louisiana. An EF2 tornado impacted the eastern part of Sulphur, destroying warehouses and damaging homes, other structures, trees, and power lines. As that tornado dissipated, an EF1 tornado developed in Westlake and moved through Downtown Lake Charles, damaging homes, businesses, trees and power lines. Later, another EF2 tornado crossed over I-10 and moved through Henderson, damaging homes and businesses, rolling mobile homes and RV, destroying outbuildings, and damaging trees and power lines. The tornado killed one person and injured another person. An unrelated EF0 tornado also occurred in Arizona. Scattered tornadic weather occurred on May 14 as well, although all the tornadoes were weak. In all, 26 tornadoes were confirmed.

=== May 16 (Italy) ===
IFU	IF0	IF0.5	IF1	IF1.5	IF2	IF2.5	IF3	IF4	IF5
1	0	1	0	0	1	0	0	0	0

A rain-wrapped IF0.5 tornado touched down near Gualtieri, causing minor damage to the roof of a cemetery. Several weak trees were downed, crops were flattened and a truck was moved. The tornado may have reached IF1 intensity. It tracked 2.2 km and reached 50 meters in width. A second rain-wrapped IF2 tornado touched down at Villa Poma 1 hour and 10 minutes later, tracking 2.6 km and reaching 110 meters in width. Seven tank cars from a freight train were blown over and a steel tower collapsed. Sporadic patterns in the grass was also observed together with a downed steel fence. Additional damage was observed to greenhouses and roofs.

=== May 19–22 (United States) ===
EFU	EF0	EF1	EF2	EF3	EF4	EF5
8	27	37	6	2	1	0

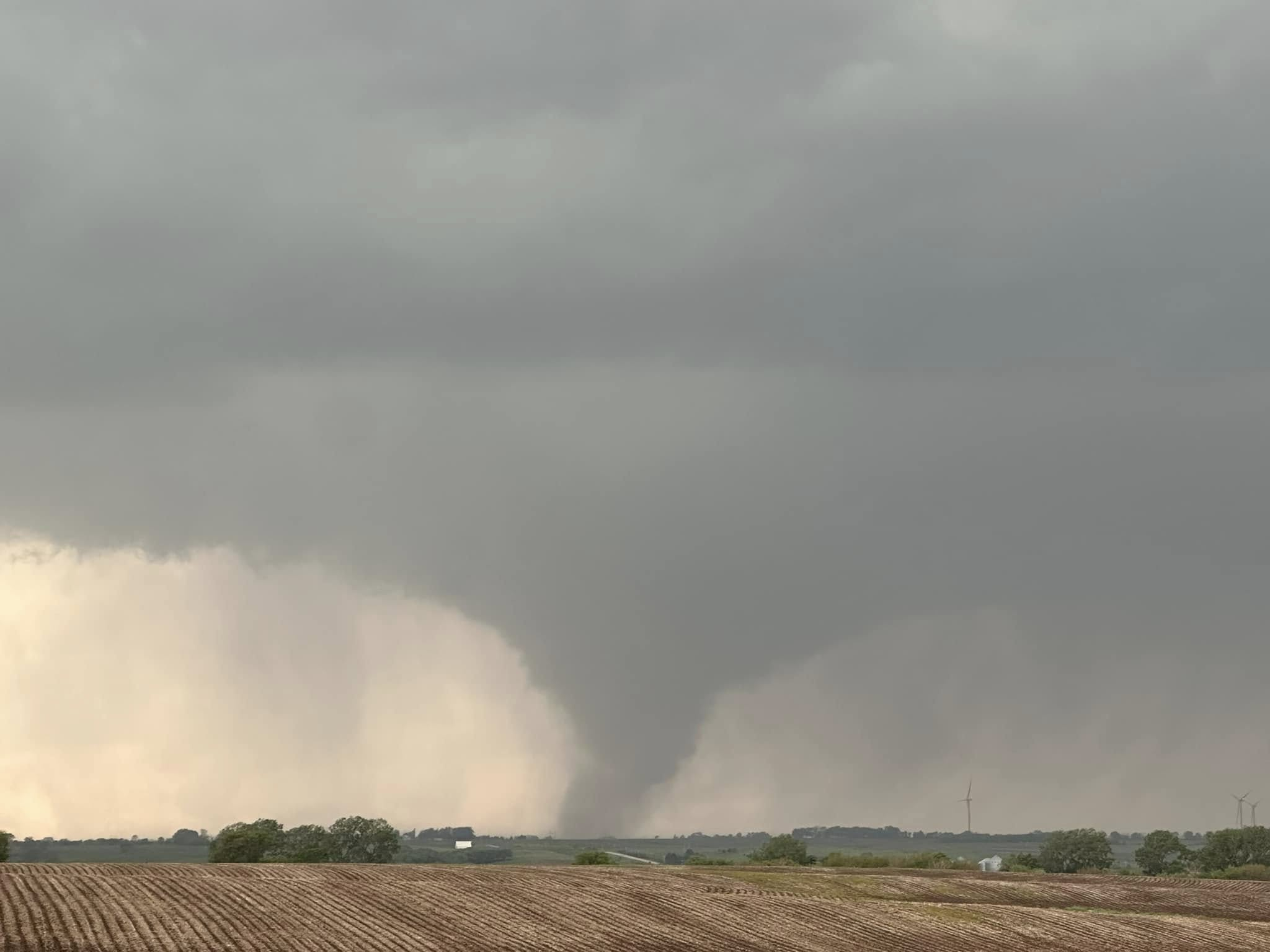
A large multi-vortex tornado in rural Iowa. This EF4 tornado later struck Greenfield, Iowa.

Two very large and significant tornado outbreaks and tornado activity along with two derechos rounded out the very active month of May starting on May 19. The first began on May 19, as severe weather produced destructive hurricane-force straight-line winds, very large hail, and numerous tornadoes across mainly Kansas and Oklahoma. One large EF2 tornado prompted the issuance of a tornado emergency for Custer City, Oklahoma while another EF2 tornado passed near Yukon. On May 21, the Storm Prediction Center issued a moderate risk for severe weather in the states of Iowa, Missouri, Minnesota, Wisconsin, and Illinois, including a 15% hatched risk for significant, long-track tornadoes. As a result, a Particularly Dangerous Situation tornado watch was issued. A few tornadoes occurred near Macedonia and Red Oak. One long-tracked and violent tornado touched down near Villisca, Iowa. Continuing northeast, it toppled and crumpled several wind turbines. The tornado then approached Greenfield, where it intensified to EF4 intensity. Numerous homes were damaged or destroyed with some of them being reduced to their foundations or swept clean. Vehicles sustained severe damage as well and multiple trees were severely debarked. Four people were killed in Greenfield.

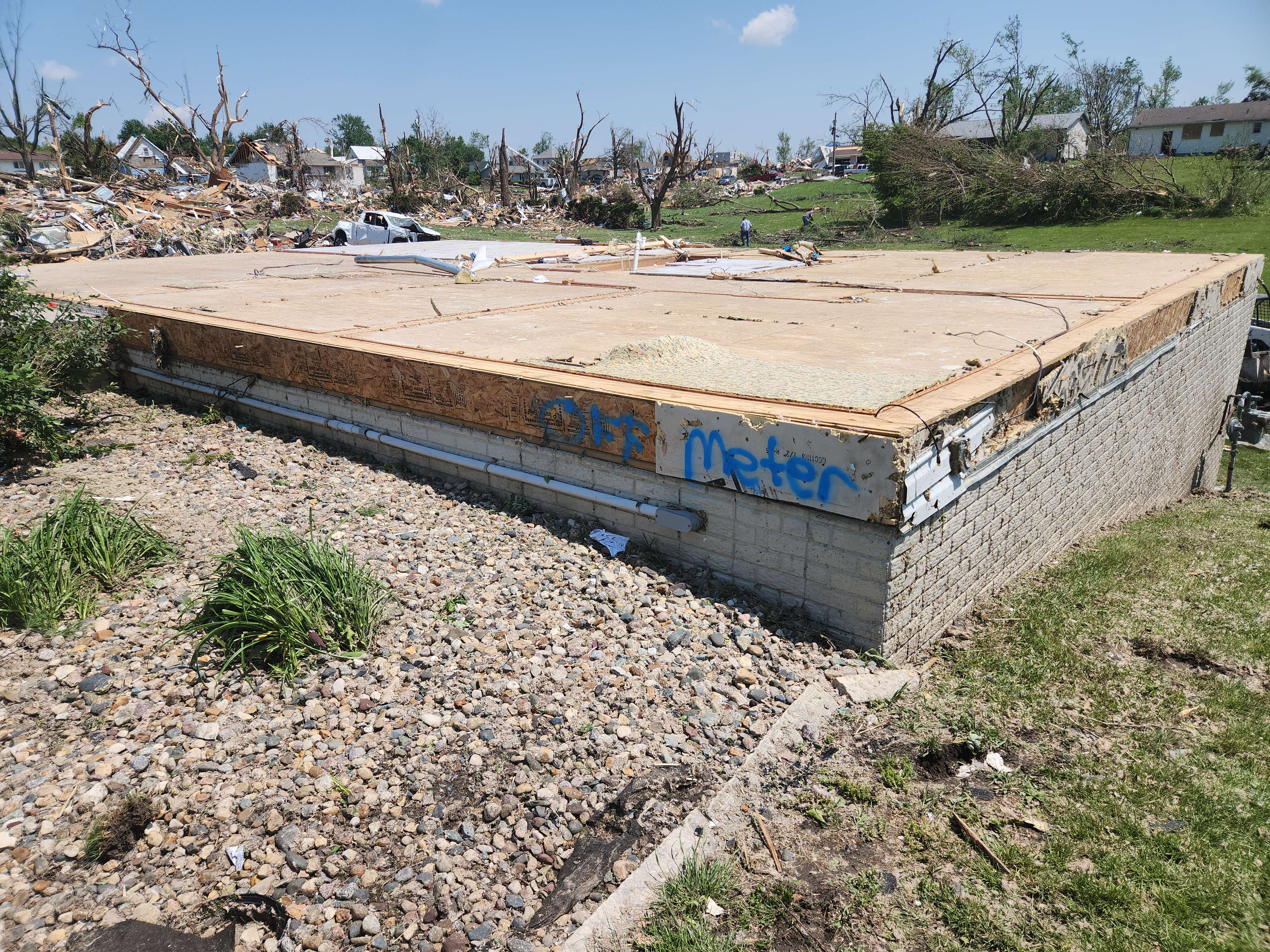
A home completely swept away at EF4 intensity in Greenfield, Iowa.

Another fatality occurred near the town of Corning, about 30 miles southwest of Greenfield when the tornado blew a vehicle off the road. At least 35 people sustained injuries to some degree. A Doppler on Wheels measured 309–318 mph (497–512 km/h) winds in a small area between 30–50 m (98–164 ft) above the surface near Greenfield making this one of the highest windspeeds ever recorded in a tornado, being just a bit weaker than the tornado that hit Bridge Creek, Oklahoma on May 3, 1999 321 mph (517 km/h). Overall, 82 tornadoes were confirmed as a result of this outbreak, resulting in 5 deaths and at least 69 injuries.

=== May 23 (Mexico) ===
Two people were killed after a fence fell onto them during a tornado in Toluca, State of Mexico.

=== May 25–27 (United States) ===
EFU	EF0	EF1	EF2	EF3	EF4	EF5
4	18	52	13	10	0	0

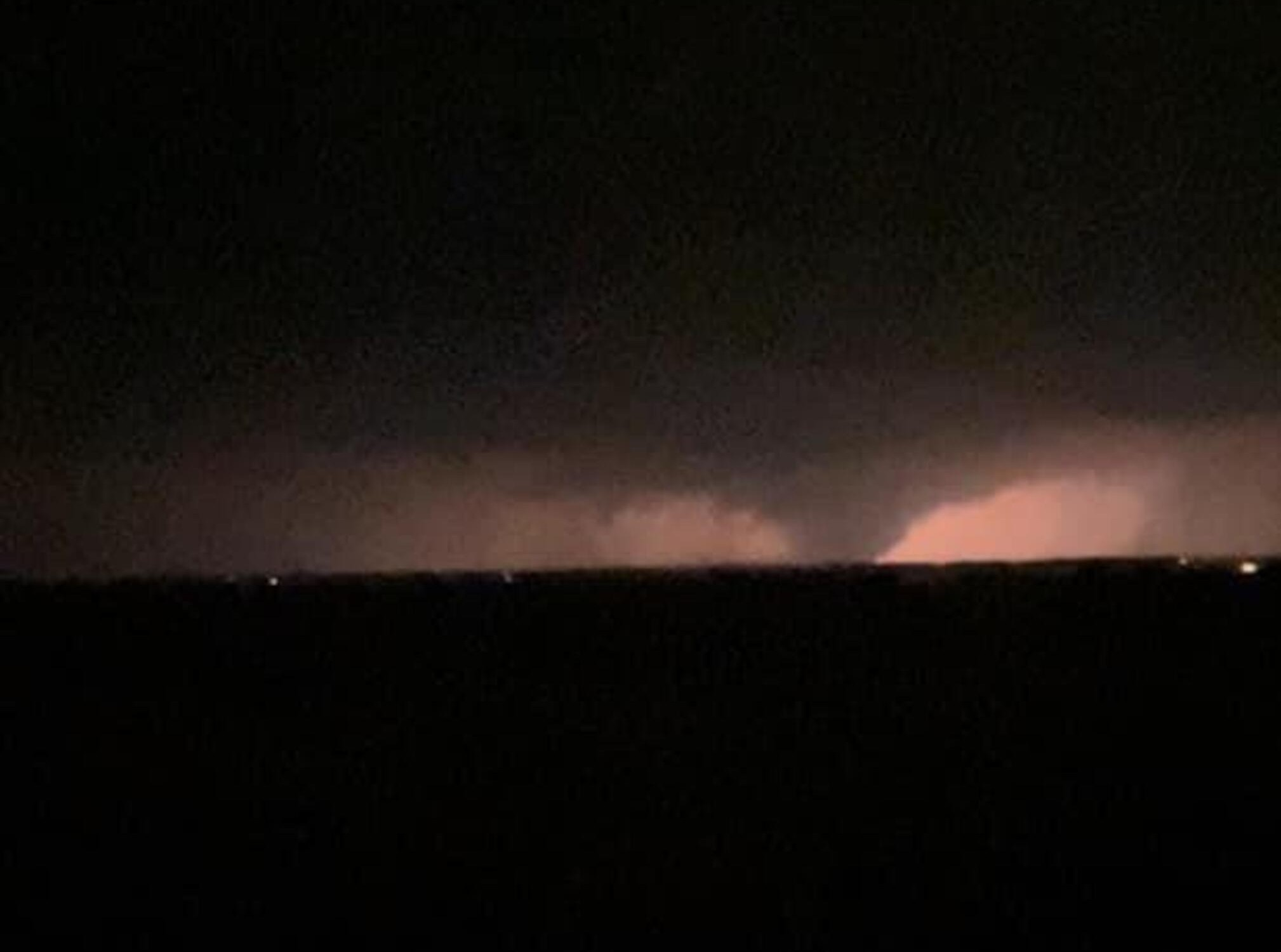
A nocturnal EF3 tornado seen from Sanger, Texas.

Another major tornado outbreak occurred on May 25 and 26, as tornadic activity continued over the next several days. During the overnight hours of May 25 into May 26, several destructive tornadoes touched down in northern Texas from an isolated supercell. One destructive and intense low-end EF3 tornado caused severe damage near Valley View and Pilot Point, Texas, killing at least seven people and injuring 100 others. Further to the north, supercell clusters formed and moved eastward across southeastern Kansas and northeastern Oklahoma as well as northern Arkansas and southern Missouri, causing widespread destruction from both tornadoes and damaging straight-line winds of up to 100 mph (160 km/h). Another destructive EF3 tornado struck Claremore and near Pryor, Oklahoma, killing two people. An EF3 tornado near Decatur, Arkansas became the largest tornado ever recorded in the state while secondary circulation spawned a damaging anticyclonic EF2 tornado. A strong EF2 tornado also struck Rogers, causing major damage. A total of four people were killed by an EF3 tornado neat Olvey and Pyatt, another tornadic fatality occurred when a low-end EF3 tornado struck Briarcliff (which was also struck by an EF2 satellite tornado), and two indirect fatalities occurred with a low-end EF3 tornado that moved through Sikeston, Missouri. In the evening hours of May 26, a large and destructive high-end EF3 tornado prompted four tornado emergencies as it impacted Crider, Charleston, and Barnsley, causing significant damage and a fatality. Overall, 97 tornadoes were confirmed as a result of this outbreak, resulting in 15 tornadic deaths and dozens more injuries, along with 10 non-tornadic deaths.

=== May 27 (Philippines) ===
An EF2 tornado struck a village in Arayat, Pampanga that was spawned by Typhoon Ewiniar (Aghon) at around 13:00 PhST. It Destroyed around 30 houses and two school buildings, and toppled electrical posts. Satellite imagery and ground-level damages showed that the tornado formed a 2 km (1.24 mi) path as it swept the village and achieved estimated wind speeds of around 201 km/h (125 Mph). Total estimated costs of infrastructure and agricultural damages reached ₱22 million and ₱8 million respectively.

=== May 30 (United States) ===
EFU	EF0	EF1	EF2	EF3	EF4	EF5
3	0	8	1	1	0	0

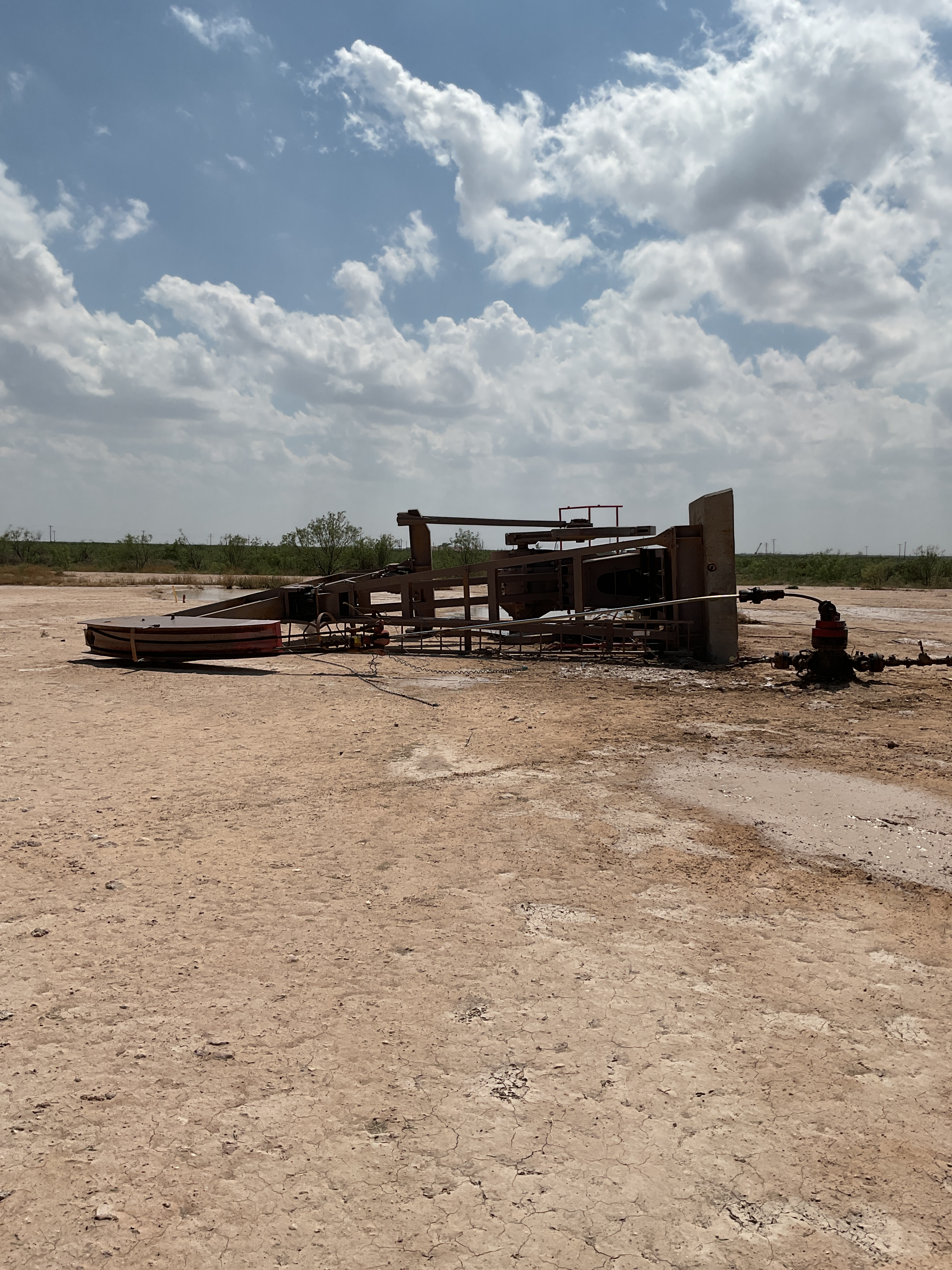
A pump jack that was overturned by an EF3 tornado west of Midkiff, Texas.

A small, but significant outbreak of tornadoes impacted Texas and Louisiana. The SPC issued an enhanced risk of severe weather over part of West Texas mainly for the threat of damaging winds and large hail, however, a 5% tornado risk was also included. That evening, numerous tornadoes touched down in Texas, including an EF2 tornado that prompted a tornado emergency for areas to the south of Midland, damaging power poles and RVs. This was the first issuance of a tornado emergency by the National Weather Service office in Midland. An EF3 tornado damaged heavy oil equipment and caused ground scouring near Midkiff. Further east, multiple EF1 tornadoes touched down near the Texas-Louisiana border, including a tornado near Stonewall, Louisiana that tossed a metal building. This outbreak produced 13 tornadoes but no casualties.

== June ==
=== June 2 (United States) ===
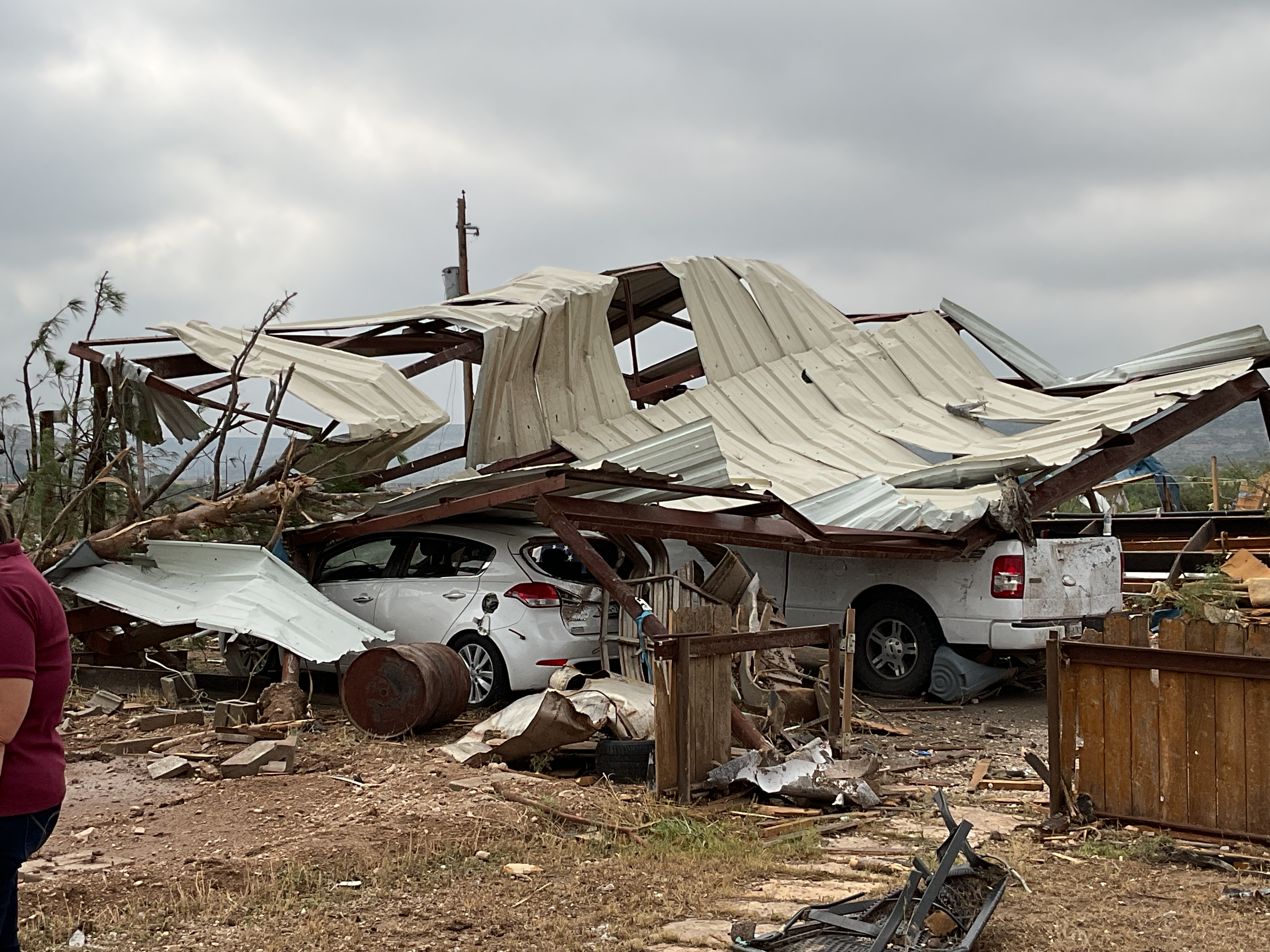
A steel carport that was destroyed at EF3 intensity in Sanderson, Texas.

EFU	EF0	EF1	EF2	EF3	EF4	EF5
5	2	1	1	1	0	0

Severe thunderstorms developed across a broad portion of the Central United States with tornadoes reported in the Dakotas and Texas. Two tornadoes, rated low-end EF3 and high-end EF1, struck Sanderson, Texas. The EF3 tornado caused significant damage to houses, destroyed a mobile home, and debarked trees, injuring 12 people, and causing $400,000 in damage. The EF1 tornado damaged roofs, snapped power poles, and destroyed a wooden building. An EF2 tornado snapped power poles and uprooted trees east of Maurine, South Dakota. Two EF0 tornadoes damaged vegetation at Lake Meredith near Sanford, Texas and two EFU tornadoes moved over remote terrain north of Silverton, Texas.

=== June 3 (Bosnia) ===
A very brief but significant tornado hit Mišin Han, Bosnia, damaging over 20 homes and crossing the M4 road. While it only tracked 0.5 km, it managed to cause IF2 damage to a home, heavily deroofing a brick home. Other homes and outbuildings also sustained some sort of damage, and trees and powerlines were downed.

=== June 3 (South Africa) ===
On June 3 around 4 pm local time, a large EF3 wedge tornado struck the small coastal town of oThongathi (Tongaat) 40 km north of Durban. The tornado caused significant damage to hundreds of homes, businesses, schools and the surrounding area. Several homes collapsed in the neighborhoods of Magwaveni and Sandfields, while trees were uprooted and vehicle damage occurred. The storm also knocked out power lines, leaving many parts of eThekwini without electricity. The tornado displaced at least 1,200 people, leaving 12 people dead and no less than 120 others injured. It also caused R481.7 million in damages. Gift of the Givers joined relief efforts.

=== June 5 (United States) ===
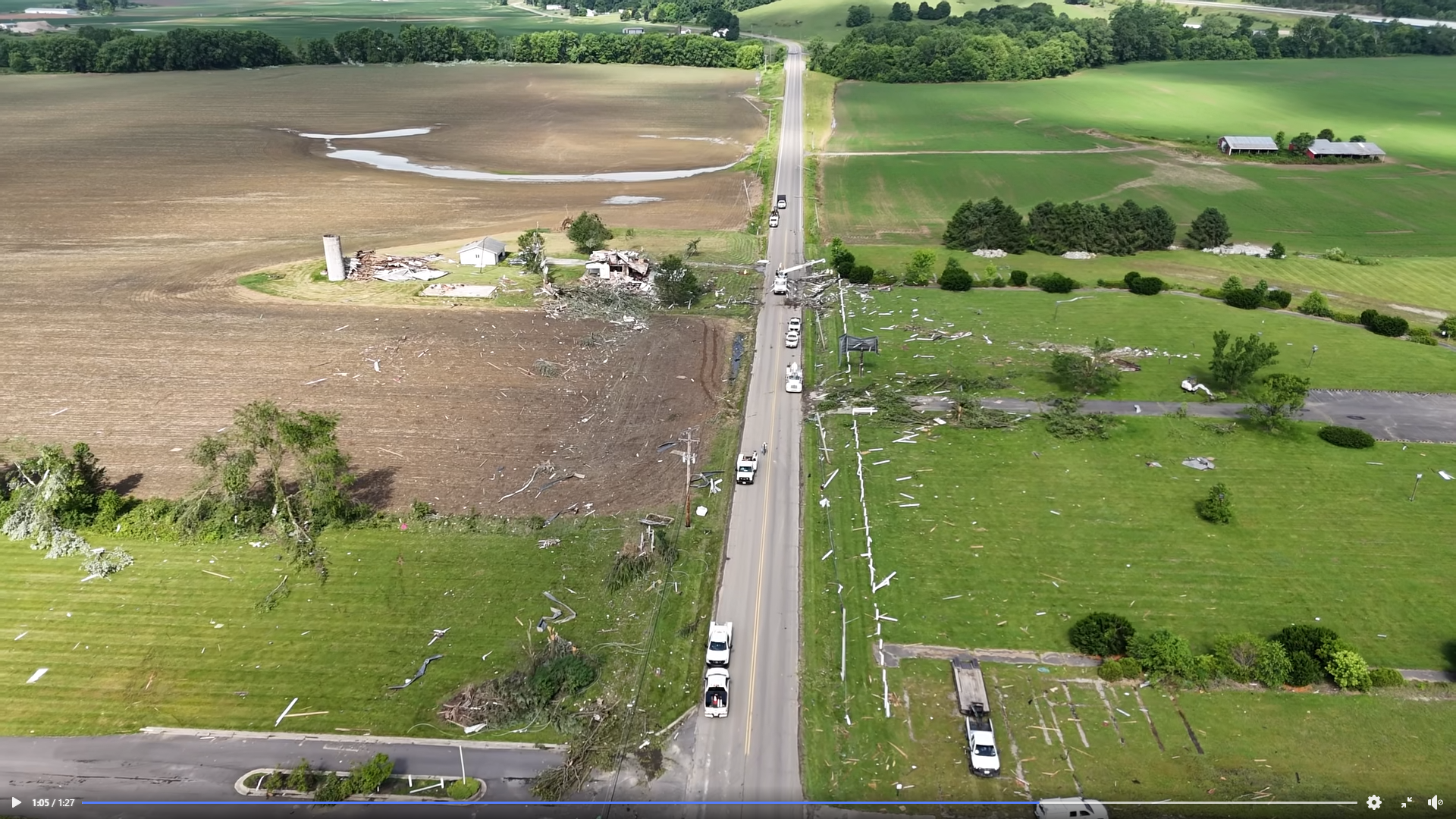
EF2 damage and ground scouring on the west side of Frazeysburg, Ohio.

EFU	EF0	EF1	EF2	EF3	EF4	EF5
0	10	11	2	0	0	0

An EF1 tornado struck near Plymouth and Livonia in Michigan, snapping and uprooting trees, and inflicting roof damage to homes. A toddler was killed, and another person was injured due to an uprooted tree. No tornado warning was issued for this storm. Another tornado, rated EF0, downed trees near Eldorado, Michigan. The highest concentration of tornadoes occurred in the Mid-Atlantic region with nine tornadoes touching down in Maryland and four others in West Virginia and far northern Virginia. An EF1 tornado moved through Gaithersburg, Maryland, where several homes were damaged by falling trees with five people being injured in one of them. A strong EF2 tornado north of Eldersburg snapped numerous trees along the western shoe of the Liberty Reservoir. Another EF1 tornado caused damage in Columbia while yet another EF1 tornado struck Arbutus and Halethorpe near Baltimore. Other tornadoes impacted Illinois, Ohio, Mississippi, and Alabama as well, including an EF2 tornado that struck Frazeysburg, Ohio, injuring eight people.

=== June 18–19 (Europe) ===
IFU	IF0	IF0.5	IF1	IF1.5	IF2	IF2.5	IF3	IF4	IF5
2	0	0	4	1	3	0	0	0	0

A severe weather outbreak in Europe spawned multiple tornadoes across the continent. On June 18, a significant tornado touched down in Carlepont, France. The tornado was filmed from multiple angles and damaged 34 buildings. A weak barn was completely destroyed, giving it an IF2 rating. Later into the evening, a cyclic supercell moved across central Germany, spawning at least three tornadoes. The first one affected mostly rural areas near Hohenbüchen, where large-scale blowdown of a birch forest yielded an IF1.5 rating. Shortly after, another tornado touched down and caused some roof damage in the town of Bockenem, which was rated IF1. The third and final tornado from this storm was also the strongest, being rated IF2. As it moved south of Heere, it completely debranched trees and left cycloidal marks in fields. The next day, a weak tornado struck a forest and nearby roads in a ski resort near Chalmazel, in France, injuring one person. Later, several tornadoes were observed in Russia, with one IF2 occurring in Pereboevo, causing roof damage along a 13.7 km long path and with one IF1 damaging roofs and downing trees near Dubishno.

=== June 25 (Georgia) ===
A rare IF2 tornado struck the Alaverdi Monastery, near the town of Akhmeta in the Kakheti region of eastern Georgia. The tornado damaged the roof of the monastery and uprooted trees. Cars were lifted into the air, injuring two people. The tornado was the strongest in the country since 2005.

=== June 25–26 (United States) ===
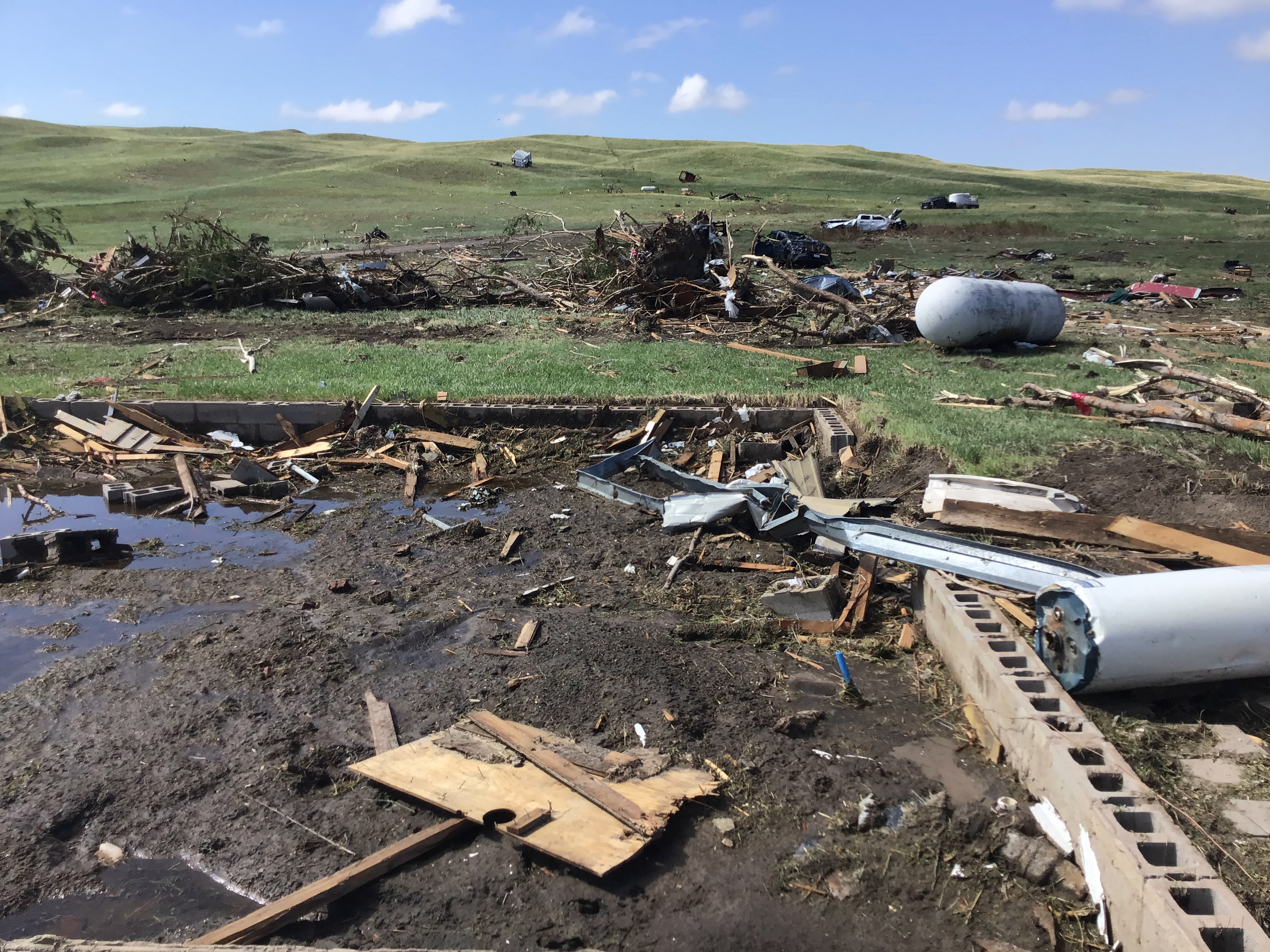
Mid-range EF3 tornado damage to a poorly constructed home southeast of Whitman, Nebraska.

EFU	EF0	EF1	EF2	EF3	EF4	EF5
7	6	6	1	1	0	0

Multiple days of significant severe weather occurred from June 25–26, resulting in at least 21 tornadoes. In the early morning of June 25, an EF1 tornado struck near Keshena, Wisconsin, snapping and uprooting trees and causing minor damage to homes and utility poles. Later in the day, a few weak landspout tornadoes occurred in central and eastern Iowa, producing minor damage to trees and outbuildings. In the evening, a powerful supercell developed in northwestern Cherry County, Nebraska, and continued south-southeast into Grant County, where it produced an intense tornado that impacted the community of Whitman. EF1 damage was observed in Whitman, with trees being snapped and uprooted. Further south, the tornado struck a large farmstead, completely destroying two poorly constructed homes and injuring one person. A newly built home nearby sustained severe damage to its exterior walls, with most interior walls still standing. The tornado continued further south, entering Hooker County and producing EF1 damage to grain bins and pivot irrigation systems. It then continued into McPherson County, lifting after tracking for nearly 40 mi (64 km). As a result of the damage, a preliminary high-end EF3 rating was applied, with wind speeds estimated at 160 mph (260 km/h). Notably, the National Weather Service office in North Platte failed to issue a tornado warning before the tornado hit Whitman, causing controversy among citizens.

On June 26, multiple tornadoes impacted the Pittsburgh, Pennsylvania metropolitan area, including an EF2 tornado near New Alexandria. Two EF1 tornadoes also touched down in the Providence, Rhode Island metropolitan area. Nearby, a Major League Baseball game at Fenway Park between the Boston Red Sox and Toronto Blue Jays was postponed until August 26. Amidst the severe storms, ground stops were imposed at Newark Liberty International Airport and LaGuardia Airport, and trains were briefly suspended on the Metro-North Railroad. The associated severe weather in the Northeast resulted in two fatalities and 300,000 power outages. However, the rainfall in the state of New Jersey alleviated developing drought conditions, with 1.93 in (49 mm) of rain in Manchester Township. In all, 21 tornadoes were confirmed.

== July ==
=== July 4–5 (China) ===
EFU	EF0	EF1	EF2	EF3	EF4	EF5
1	1	3	1	4	0	0

On the afternoon of July 4, a tornado struck Dongtai, Jiangsu Province, destroying some farmhouses. The next day, a powerful and deadly EF3 tornado killed five people and injured 83 others after travelling through the downtown of Dongming, Shandong. This tornado destroyed an industrial estate, directly struck high-rise apartments, and damaged 3000 houses. A large EF3 tornado impacted in Yuncheng County in the Heze City area in the province of Shandong, metal transmission towers were crumpled, power poles were snapped, steel sheds were ripped away, and trees were uprooted. Another large EF3 tornado in Liangshan County in the Jining area in the Shandong province, removing shingles off of homes, snapping many trees, and crumpling metal transmission towers. The final intense tornado of the outbreak occurred in Ningyang County around the Tai'an area, mangling transmission towers, snapping power lines, overturning vehicles, and removing shingles off of homes. Several other weaker tornadoes occurred in this outbreak, including an EF2 tornado in Juancheng County that snapped large trees and collapsed homes.

=== July 8–10 (Hurricane Beryl) ===
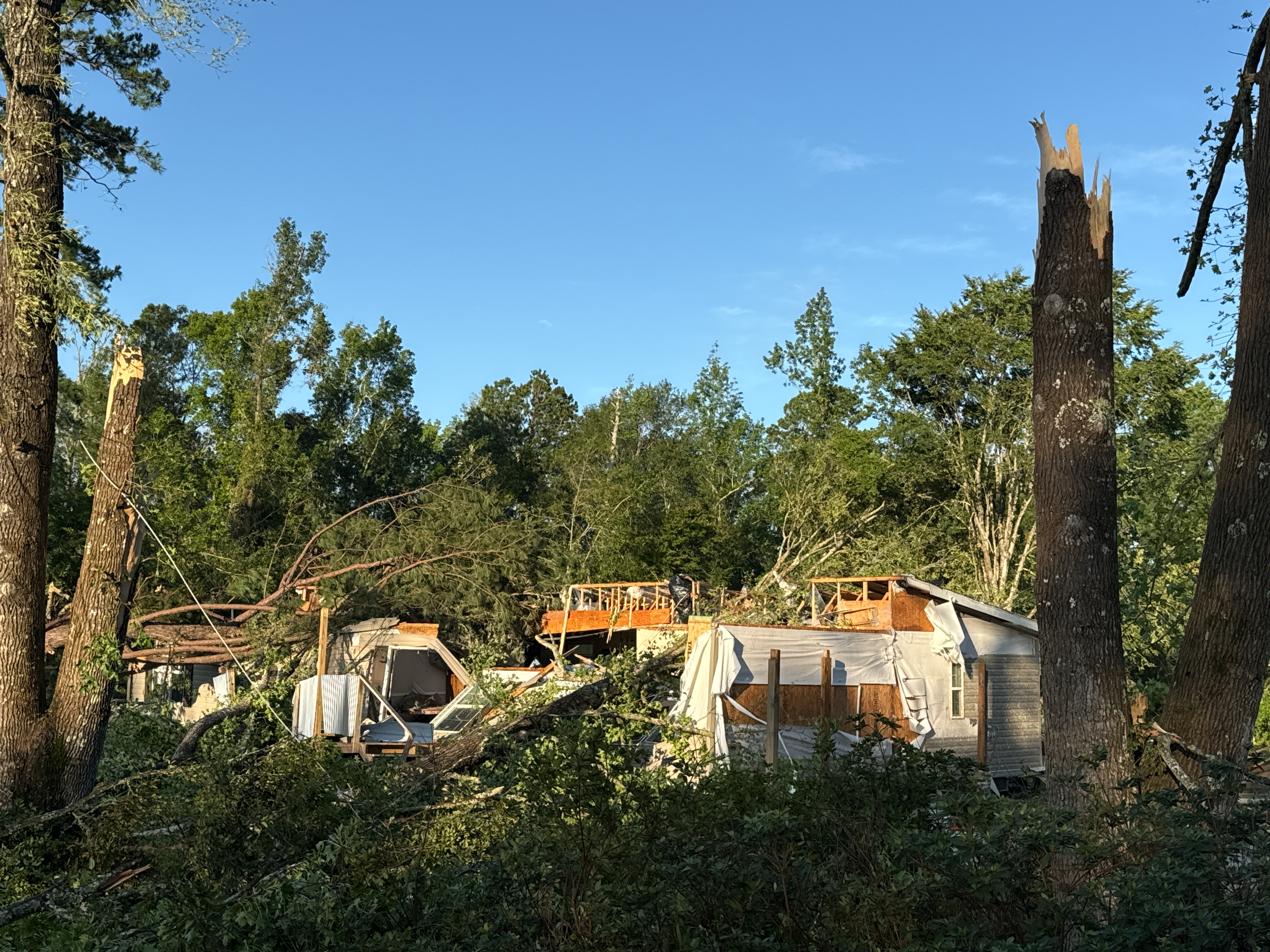
EF2 damage to a home and trees on the southwest side of Jasper, Texas.

EFU	EF0	EF1	EF2	EF3	EF4	EF5
2	13	43	9	1	0	0

A damaging tornado outbreak spawned by Hurricane Beryl struck Eastern Texas, western Louisiana, and southern Arkansas on July 8. Tornadoes have been confirmed in several locations, including several EF2 tornadoes. One person was injured by a low-end EF2 tornado that tracked through the western side of Jasper, Texas. Another tornado struck Pleasant Hill, Louisiana before reaching EF2 intensity and causing major damage north of the town. Later, a long-tracked high-end EF1 tornado caused an injury near Bethany, Louisiana and Texas. A very long-tracked low-end EF2 tornado killed two women and injured one child east of Benton, Louisiana when a tree fell on their mobile home. The same storm would produce seven additional tornadoes, including an EF1 tornado in Texarkana, Texas.

The outbreak continued into July 9 with more tornadoes being confirmed in the Ohio Valley. Most of them were spawned by a long-lived supercell that tracked out of northern Kentucky and into southern Indiana. One of the tornadoes was an intense low-end EF3 tornado near Mt. Vernon, Indiana. The interior Northeastern United States and Ontario was impacted on July 10. The strongest tornado was a low-end EF2 tornado that destroyed multiple farm buildings near Eden, New York. In all, 68 tornadoes were confirmed, making it the largest tornado outbreak spawned by a tropical cyclone since 2005.

=== July 13 (Lithuania & Latvia) ===
IFU	IF0	IF0.5	IF1	IF1.5	IF2	IF2.5	IF3	IF4	IF5
0	0	0	0	1	3	0	0	0	0

A small outbreak of four tornadoes struck Lithuania and Latvia late in the afternoon. Three of the tornadoes, which were all rated IF2, struck in Lithuania, damaging residential buildings, debranching trees, and sturdy roofs completely ripped off of buildings in/around the towns of Jauniškė, Burbaičiai, Vileikiai. An IF1.5 tornado, in Latvia, snapped trees, ripped portions of roofs off of buildings, and scattered debris long distances in Olaine.

=== July 13–16 (United States) ===
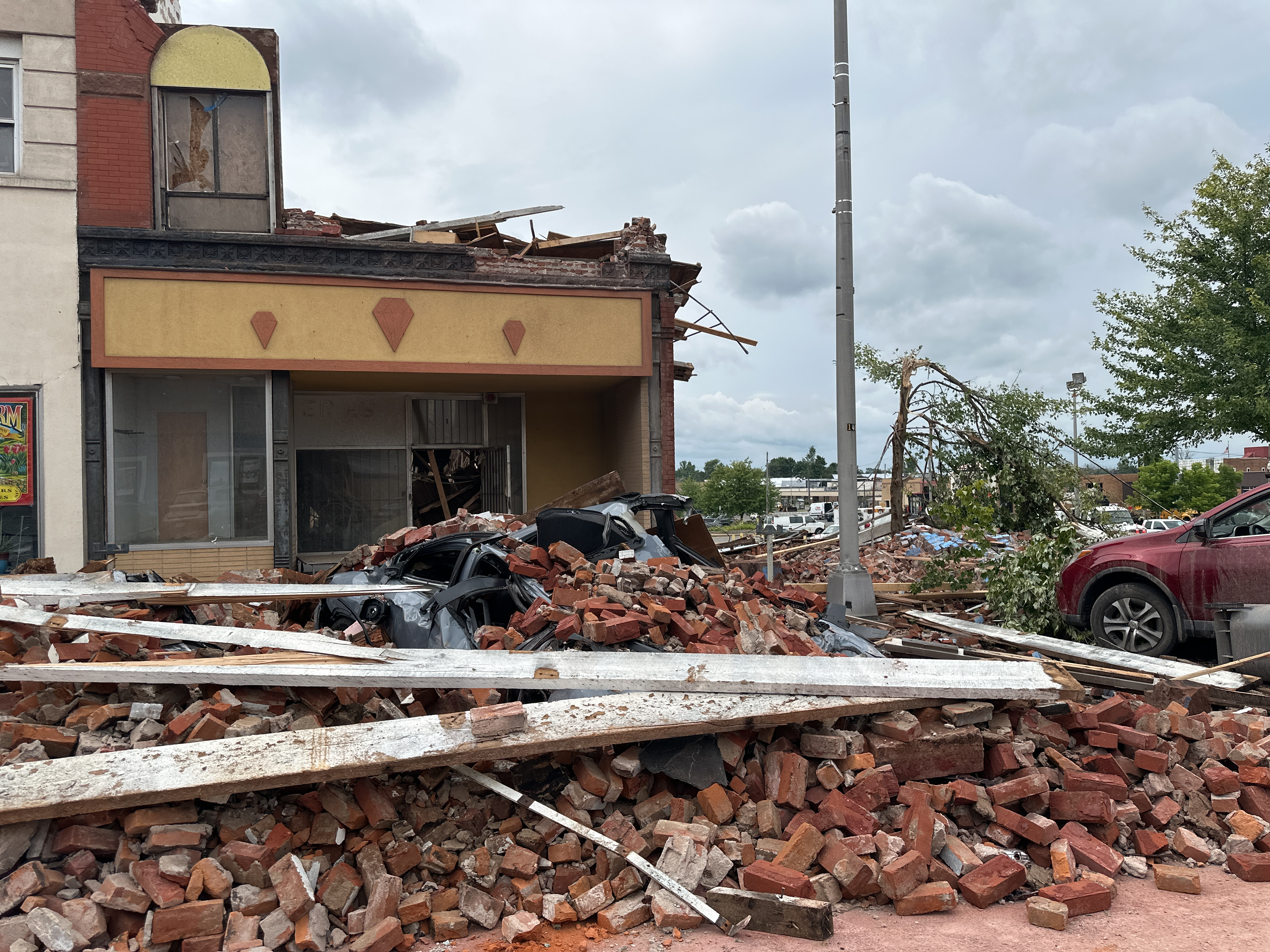
High-end EF2 damage in Rome, New York on July 16, 2024.

EFU	EF0	EF1	EF2	EF3	EF4	EF5
8	39	40	3	0	0	0

A period of enhanced tornadic activity occurred as intense severe thunderstorms and derechos swept through the Midwest, Great Lakes, and Northeast, including a derecho that produced EF1 tornadoes that struck Davenport and Chicago on July 15. A long-tracked EF2 tornado southwest of Chicago injured two people as well. On July 16, a high-end EF2 tornado caused major damage in Rome, New York. One person was killed by an EF1 tornado in Canastota as well. In all, 90 tornadoes were confirmed.

== August ==
=== August 4–9 (Hurricane Debby) ===
EFU	EF0	EF1	EF2	EF3	EF4	EF5
0	9	12	2	1	0	0

Two dozen tornadoes touched down across the Southeastern, Mid-Atlantic, and Northeastern United States in association with the landfalls and passage of Hurricane Debby. On August 7, an EF2 tornado damaged multiple homes along with trees and vegetation. August 8, an EF2 tornado caused considerable damage in Greene County, North Carolina. Shortly after that, an EF3 tornado killed a person near Lucama when their home collapsed. In all, 24 tornadoes were confirmed.

=== August 17 (Canada) ===
An EF2 tornado struck Ayr, Ontario, causing significant damage to homes, trees, business in the central area and vehicles. Two trailers and an empty rail cart were overturned. One injury was reported.

== September ==
=== September 3 (Indonesia) ===
A tornado damaged at least 244 homes in the villages of Cimayang, Bogor Regency. Two people were killed and four others sustained injuries when a building collapsed.

=== September 11–20 (Europe) ===
IFU	IF0	IF0.5	IF1	IF1.5	IF2	IF2.5	IF3	IF4	IF5
10	7	5	3	3	2	0	0	0	0

Between September 11–20, a large tornado outbreak sequence occurred across Europe, with 30 tornadoes confirmed, along with 90 waterspouts. One of the regional tornado outbreaks was associated with European Windstorm Boris. On September 14, a strong tornado struck the villages of Boża Wola, Wierzchowiny, Kruszyna, Jeziorno, and Urbanów in Poland. The European Severe Storms Laboratory rated the damage to two residential structures in Wierzchowiny IF2 on the International Fujita scale. On September 12 just after midday, a tornado was spawned by a thunderstorm in the town of Aldershot, United Kingdom. It had caused the most damage on Cadnam Close. It was rated IF2 by the ESSL due to roof damage to two stairwells and multiple damages throughout Cadnam close, Basing drive, Andover way and onto Boxalls lane.

=== September 18 (Philippines) ===
An EF2 tornado struck four villages Cabatuan, Iloilo where it damaged a total of 44 houses, seven of which were destroyed. It also damaged several agricultural crops and school buildings. Total costs of the damage caused by the tornado was estimated up to ₱2 Million.

=== September 25–26 (Europe) ===
IFU	IF0	IF0.5	IF1	IF1.5	IF2	IF2.5	IF3	IF4	IF5
5	0	2	4	2	0	1	0	0	0

On the morning of September 25, an unrated tornado was observed near Pirveli Guripuli, Georgia. The same day, five tornadoes struck France, Germany, and the Netherlands, the strongest of which was an IF1.5 tornado that struck forested areas near Gremmendorf, Germany. A waterspout made landfall causing minor damage in Italy and a tornado near Svullrya, Norway flattened a forest, earning an IF1.5 rating. The next day, two more waterspouts made landfall in Italy and an IF1 tornado caused minor damage in Saint-Jean-de-Losne, France. A few hours later, three tornadoes struck Belgium, the worst of which struck Beauvechain, this tornado ripped roofs off of houses and completely destroyed some weaker brick buildings. This tornado was rated IF2.5.

=== September 26–27 (Hurricane Helene) ===
EFU	EF0	EF1	EF2	EF3	EF4	EF5
1	19	13	1	1	0	0

The landfall of Hurricane Helene spawned several tornadoes across the Southeastern United States. An EF1 tornado late on September 26 tossed a mobile home near Alamo, Georgia, killing both occupants. The strongest of these was a low-end EF3 tornado that struck the northern part of Rocky Mount, North Carolina, completely leveling a brick building, destroying most of the walls on an auto parts shop, and throwing vehicles. Fifteen people were injured. This tornado was the second EF3 tornado that has hit Rocky Mount in a year in a half.

=== September 28 (Russia) ===
On September 28, a destructive tornado of IF3 strength ripped through Berezino, a village in the Klinsky District of Russia's Moscow Oblast, killing one person and causing significant damage.

== October ==
=== October 8–9 (Hurricane Milton) ===
EFU	EF0	EF1	EF2	EF3	EF4	EF5
4	7	25	6	3	0	0

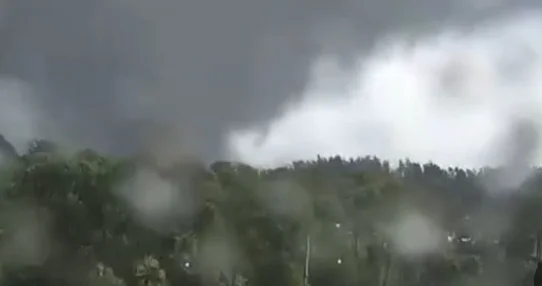
An EF3 tornado in Fort Pierce, Florida.

A tornado outbreak caused by Hurricane Milton occurred across southern Florida. Several tornadoes were confirmed by various NWS offices across the state. An EF3 tornado killed six people when it tore through the Spanish Lakes Country Club Village community in northern Fort Pierce. In addition, a low-end EF3 tornado hit the city of Palm Beach Gardens, and another low-end EF3 tornado struck the community of Lakeport, both with wind speeds estimated at 140 mph (225 km/h).

=== October 29 (Spain) ===
During the afternoon on October 29, a strong IF2-rated tornado tore through Alginet. This tornado severely damaged industrial buildings and caused IF2 damage to a supermarket. According to ESSL, this tornado tracked 7 km (4.3 miles) with a max width of 400 meters (1,312 feet). No casualties have been confirmed.

== November ==
=== November 2–5 (United States) ===
EFU	EF0	EF1	EF2	EF3	EF4	EF5
12	12	14	3	3	0	0

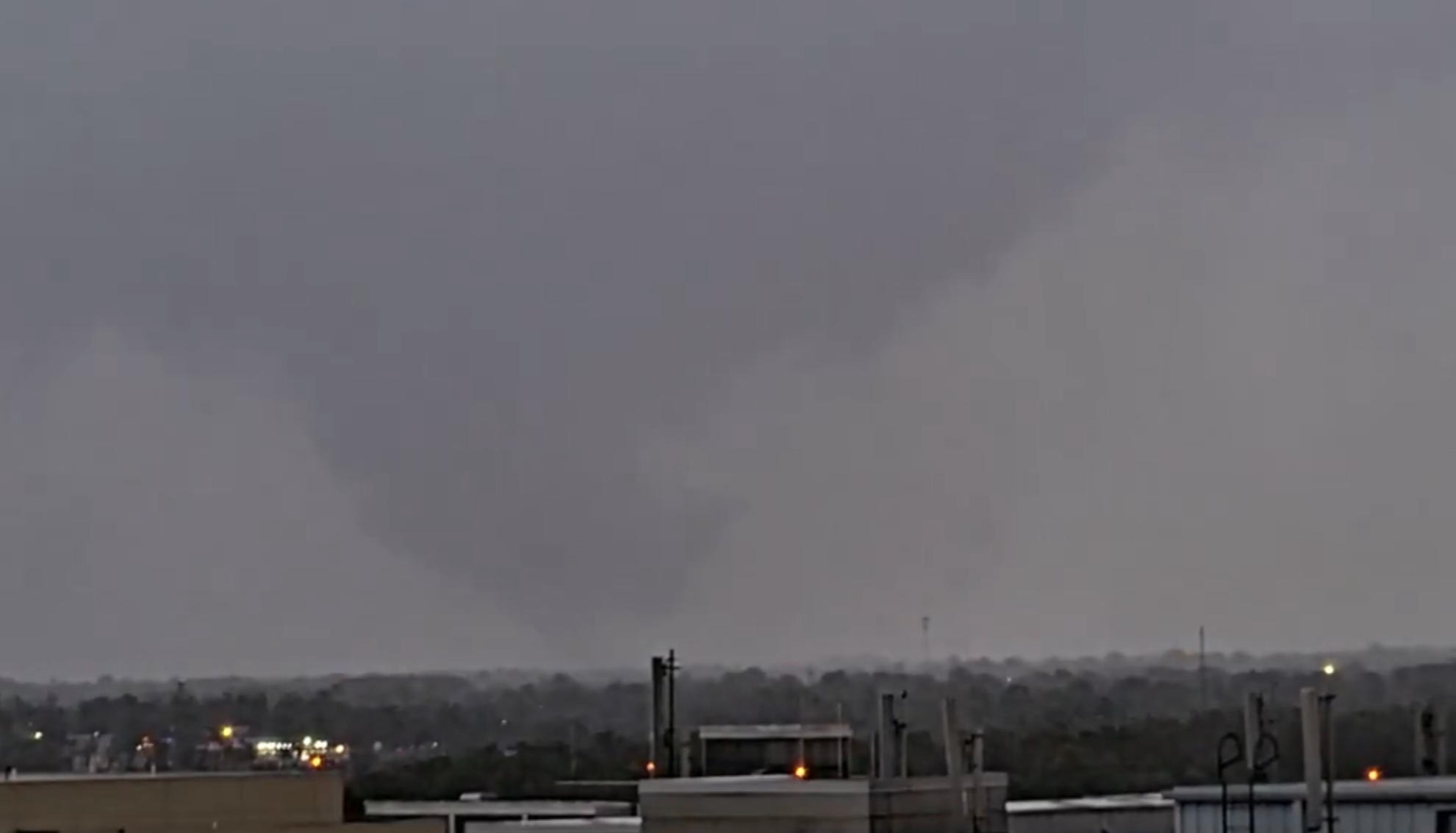
Photograph of the Rogers–Little Flock, Arkansas EF2 tornado on November 4.

The month started off with multiple significant tornadoes striking Oklahoma. Early on November 3, a short-lived, but intense EF3 tornado impacted Valley Brook, causing major damage to homes. About an hour later, another intense EF3 tornado struck the suburbs of Harrah. At least six people were injured in the Oklahoma City metropolitan area. Other tornadoes likely struck north of Hollister and near Choctaw overnight. A third EF3 tornado hit Comanche which was produced from a long-tracked, cyclical supercell that formed in North Texas. More tornadoes occurred over that afternoon and the next day, including one EF2 tornado that impacted Rogers, Arkansas on November 4. In addition, flooding across Missouri killed five people, two of whom being poll workers during the November 5 elections, and the other three all perishing near Gravois Creek.

=== November 20 (Greece) ===
A tornado tore through parts of Aetorrachis, damaging greenhouses, stables, and causing IF2-rated damage to olive trees. According to ESSL, this tornado tracked 6 km, possibly more, and the width is unknown. No injuries or deaths have been reported.

== December ==
=== December 28–29 (United States) ===
EFU	EF0	EF1	EF2	EF3	EF4	EF5
1	39	63	3	3	0	0

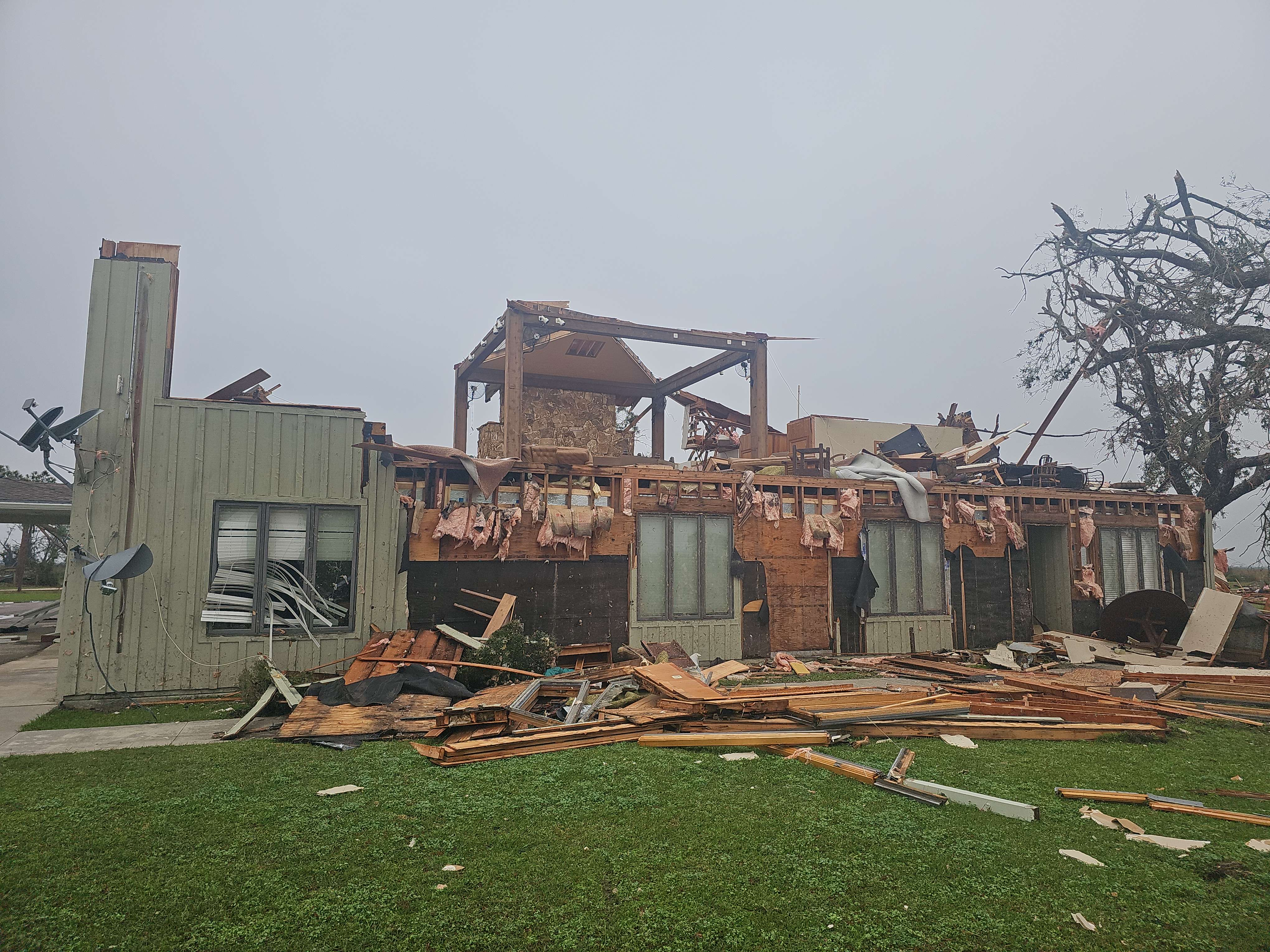
Damage to a hunting lodge near Taylor Landing, Texas from an EF3 tornado.

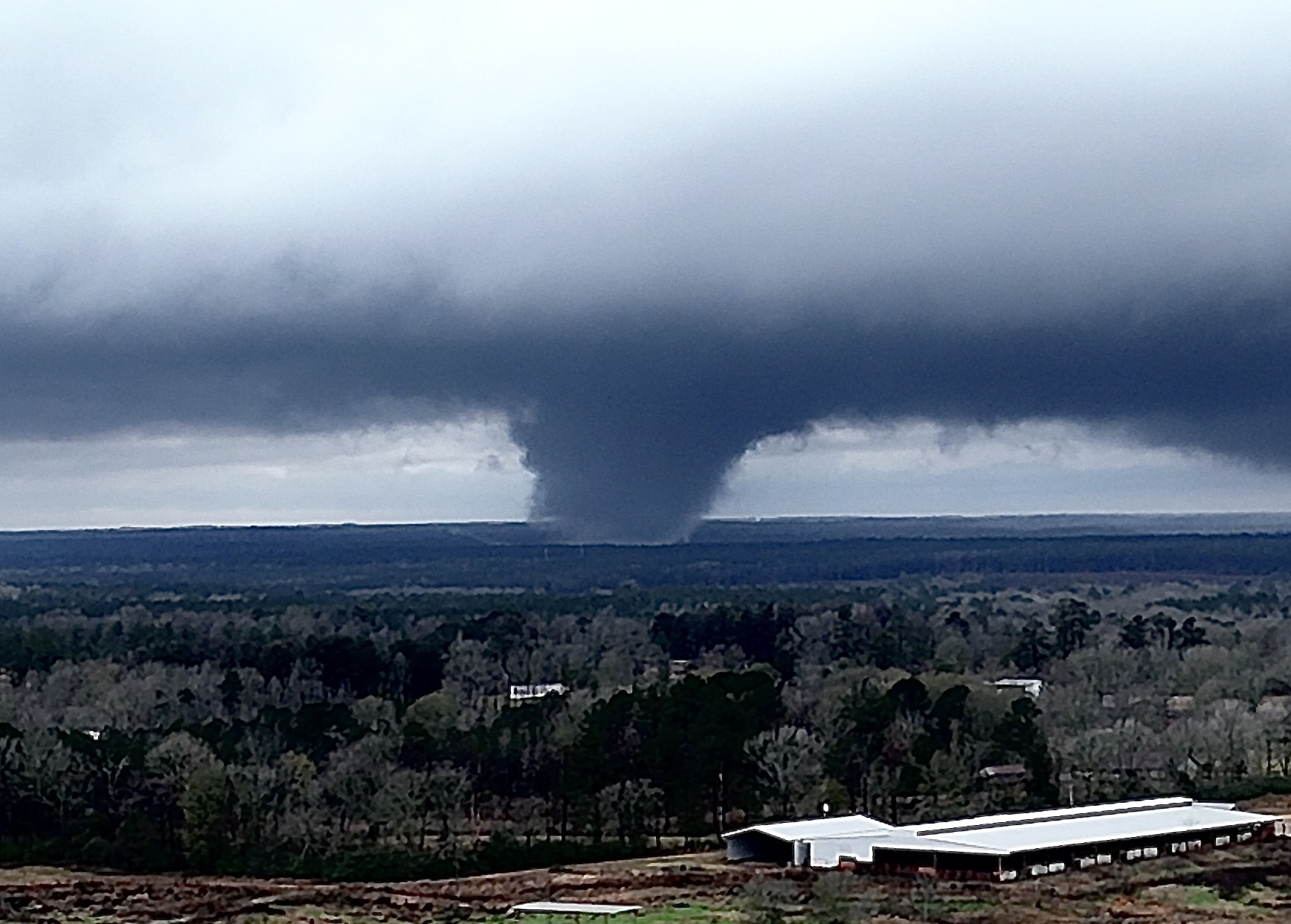
A drone shot of a large EF3 tornado near Bude, Mississippi

A destructive outbreak impacted Dixie Alley in late-December, producing 109 tornadoes, including multiple strong tornadoes in the Houston, Texas metropolitan area. One fatality and four injuries occurred near Hillcrest in Brazoria County, Texas from an EF2 tornado. The same storm produced a large high-end EF3 tornado that traveled nearly 69 miles through Chambers and Jefferson counties in Texas, passing just south of Port Arthur and into Southern Louisiana, injuring one person. Another destructive EF3 tornado passed near McCall Creek, Mississippi, injuring two people, and a high-end EF1 tornado caused major damage in Athens, Alabama.

=== December 31 (Argentina) ===
On the night of December 31, a tornado caused three injuries when it produced severe damage to a hotel near Oncativo, Córdoba.

== Research on tornadoes ==
- In April 2024:
  - In mid-April, the National Severe Storms Laboratory along with Texas Tech University begin the Low-Level Internal Flows in Tornadoes (LIFT) Project, with the goal to collect data from the “damage layer” of tornadoes; from ground level to 20 m (22 yd) above the surface. The LIFT project deployed 11 times between April–June, gathering data from "numerous successful intercepts".
  - On April 26, a Doppler on Wheels (DOW) mobile radar truck measured 1-second wind speeds of approximately 224 mph (360 km/h) at a height of ~282 yards (258 m) as a tornado passed near Harlan, Iowa, after causing damage in the community of Minden.
- In May 2024:
  - On May 21, a violent EF4 tornado struck the town of Greenfield, Iowa. As the tornado moved through the town, a Doppler on Wheels measured winds of at least >250 mph (400 km/h), "possibly as high as 290 mph (470 km/h)" at 48 yards (44 m) above the surface. Pieter Groenemeijer, the director of the European Severe Storms Laboratory, noted that "on the IF-scale, 250 mph measured below 60 m above ground level is IF4 on the IF-scale, 290 mph is IF5." The peak wind speed estimate was revised to between 309 mph (497 km/h) and 318 mph (512 km/h), a figure "among the highest wind speeds ever determined using DOW data", on June 22, 2024.
  - A few weeks after the Greenfield tornado, the National Oceanic and Atmospheric Administration released details about an experimental warning system which was tested before and during the tornado. This new warning system, named Warn-on-Forecast System (WoFS), was created by the Hazardous Weather Testbed housed in the National Weather Center in Norman, Oklahoma. During the experiment and test, the WoFS gave a high indication of “near-ground rotation” in and around the area of Greenfield, Iowa between 2-4 p.m. According to the press release, 75-minutes later, the violent EF4 tornado touched down. Scientists with the National Severe Storms Laboratory were able to give local National Weather Service forecasters a 75-minute lead time for the tornado.
- In September 2024:
  - Researchers with the ERATOSTHENES Centre of Excellence, the Cyprus University of Technology, the Harz University of Applied Studies, the Leibniz-Institut für Troposphärenforschung, and the Cyprus Department of Meteorology, published a case study on the 2024 Cyprus IF1.5 tornado on February 14, 2024. In their study, the researchers published about how the Atmospheric Remote Sensing Observatory (CARO), located 10 km (6.2 mi) away from the tornado in the city of Limassol, recorded a vertical wind speed of 10 m/s (22 mph) as well as an instantaneous rate of rain from the storm of 90 millimetres per hour (3.5 in/h).

== See also ==
- Weather of 2024
- 2023–24 North American winter
- 2024–25 North American winter
- Meteorology in the 21st century
