= Omaha–Council Bluffs metropolitan area =

Omaha Metro
- Metropolitan Statistical Area
- Omaha–Council Bluffs, NE–IA; Metropolitan Statistical Area
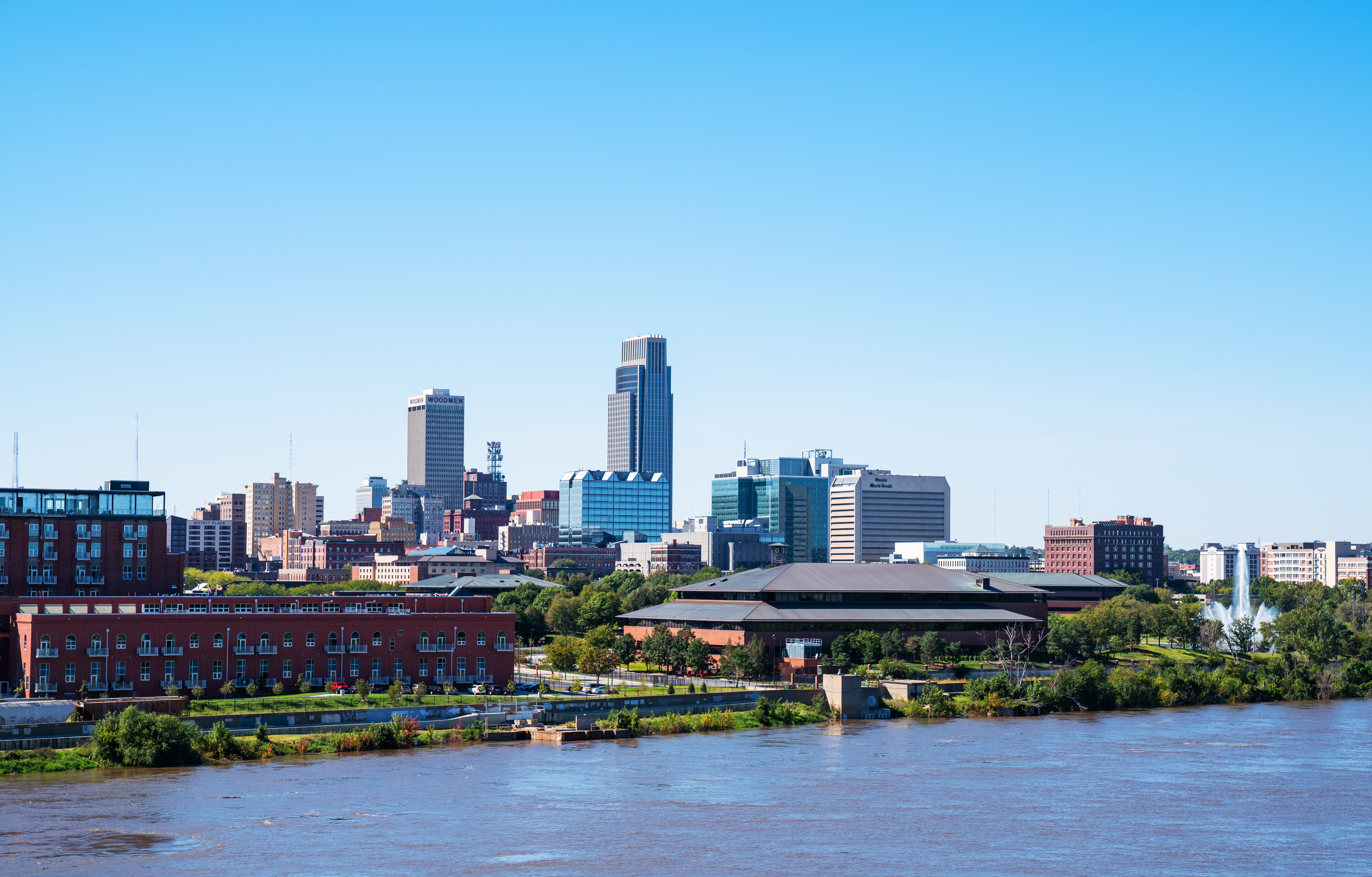
- Downtown Omaha
Interactive Map of Omaha, NE–IA CSA
City of Omaha
City of Council Bluffs
Omaha, NE–IA MSA
Fremont, NE µSA
- Coordinates: 41°15′35″N 95°55′18″W
- Country: United States
- State: Nebraska; Iowa
- Largest city: Omaha
- Other cities: Council Bluffs; Bellevue; Papillion; La Vista; Fremont

Area
  - Total: 4,407 sq mi (11,410 km^{2})

Population (2025)
  - Total: 1,009,836
  - Rank: 56th in the U.S.
  - Density: 340/sq mi (133/km^{2})

GDP
  - Total: $92.356 billion (2023)
- Time zone: UTC-6 (CST)
  - Summer (DST): UTC-5 (CDT)

The Omaha metropolitan area, officially known as the Omaha, NE–IA, Metropolitan Statistical Area (MSA), is an urbanized, bi-state metro region in Nebraska and Iowa in the American Midwest, centered on the city of Omaha, Nebraska. The region consists of eight counties (five in Nebraska and three in Iowa), and extends over a large area on both sides of the Missouri River. Covering 4,407 square miles (11,410 km^{2}) and with a population of 967,604 (2020), the Omaha metropolitan area is the most populous in both Nebraska and Iowa (although the Des Moines–West Des Moines MSA is the largest MSA centered entirely in Iowa), and is the 58th most populous MSA in the United States. The 2003 revision to metropolitan area definitions was accompanied by the creation of micropolitan areas and combined statistical areas. Fremont, in Dodge County, Nebraska, was designated a micropolitan area. The Omaha–Fremont Combined Statistical Area has a population of 1,058,125 (2020 estimate). Approximately 1.5 million people reside within the Greater Omaha area, within a 50 mi (80 km) radius of Downtown Omaha.

== Historical definitions and populations ==
Historical population
Census	Pop.	Note	%±
1950	366,395		—
1960	457,873		25.0%
1970	540,142		18.0%
1980	589,857		9.2%
1990	678,262		15.0%
2000	767,041		13.1%
2010	865,350		12.8%
2020	967,604		11.8%
2025 (est.)	1,009,836		4.4%

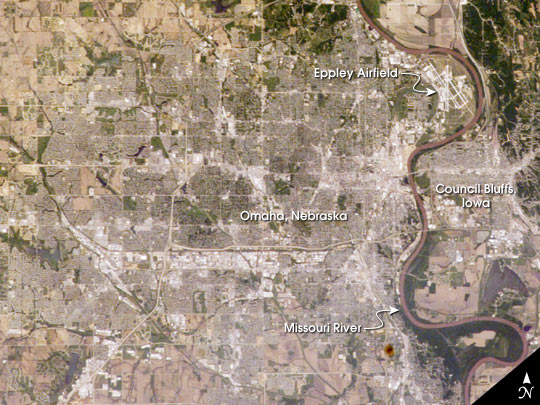
View from space of Omaha and Council Bluffs

Standard definitions for United States metropolitan areas were created in 1949; the first census which had metropolitan area data was the 1950 census. At that time, the Omaha–Council Bluffs metropolitan area comprised three counties: Douglas and Sarpy in Nebraska, and Pottawattamie in Iowa. No additional counties were added to the metropolitan area until 1983, when Washington County of Nebraska was added. Cass County, Nebraska, was added in 1993; Saunders County in Nebraska and Harrison and Mills counties in Iowa became part of the Omaha–Council Bluffs metropolitan area in 2003.

== Components of the Omaha–Council Bluffs metropolitan area ==
=== Metropolitan Statistical Area ===
The Omaha, NE-IA Metropolitan Statistical Area includes eight counties, of which five are in Nebraska and three are in Iowa.

County	State	Seat	2025 estimate	2020 census	Change	Area	Density
Douglas	Nebraska	Omaha	606,460	584,526	+3.75%	349 sq mi (900 km^{2})	1,738/sq mi (671/km^{2})
Sarpy	Nebraska	Papillion	208,303	190,604	+9.29%	248 sq mi (640 km^{2})	840/sq mi (324/km^{2})
Pottawattamie	Iowa	Council Bluffs	92,996	93,667	−0.72%	959 sq mi (2,480 km^{2})	98/sq mi (38/km^{2})
Cass	Nebraska	Plattsmouth	27,657	26,598	+3.98%	566 sq mi (1,470 km^{2})	49/sq mi (19/km^{2})
Saunders	Nebraska	Wahoo	23,702	22,278	+6.39%	760 sq mi (2,000 km^{2})	31/sq mi (12/km^{2})
Washington	Nebraska	Blair	21,302	20,865	+2.09%	393 sq mi (1,020 km^{2})	54/sq mi (21/km^{2})
Mills	Iowa	Glenwood	14,793	14,484	+2.13%	441 sq mi (1,140 km^{2})	34/sq mi (13/km^{2})
Harrison	Iowa	Logan	14,623	14,582	+0.28%	702 sq mi (1,820 km^{2})	21/sq mi (8/km^{2})
Total			1,009,836	967,604	+4.36%	4,418 sq mi (11,440 km^{2})	229/sq mi (88/km^{2})

=== Combined Statistical Area ===
The Omaha–Fremont, NE-IA Combined Statistical Area is made up of six counties in Nebraska and three counties in Iowa. The statistical area includes the Omaha, NE-IA Metropolitan Statistical Area and the Fremont, NE Micropolitan Statistical Area.

Statistical Area	2025 Estimate	2020 Census	Change	Area	Density
Omaha, NE-IA Metropolitan Statistical Area	1,009,836	967,604	+4.36%	4,418 sq mi (11,440 km^{2})	229/sq mi (88/km^{2})
Fremont, NE Micropolitan Statistical Area	38,057	37,167	+2.39%	543 sq mi (1,410 km^{2})	70/sq mi (27/km^{2})
Total	1,047,893	1,004,771	+4.29%	4,961 sq mi (12,850 km^{2})	211/sq mi (82/km^{2})

=== Cities and suburbs ===
The following are cities and villages in the Omaha, NE-IA Metropolitan Statistical Area categorized based on the United States Census Bureau 2025 population estimates. No population estimates are released for census-designated places (CDPs), which are marked with an asterisk (*). These places are categorized based on their 2020 Census population.

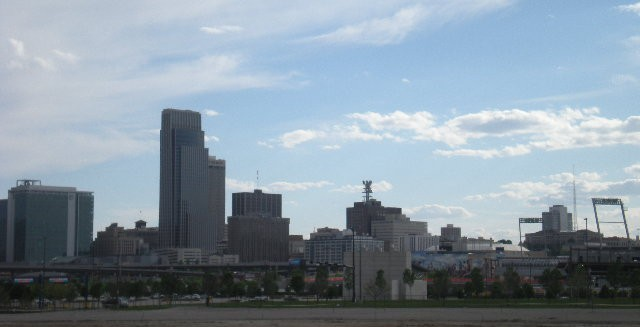
The Downtown Omaha skyline from North Downtown.

Principal city

- Omaha (488,797)

Places with 50,000 to 100,000 inhabitants

- Bellevue, Nebraska (64,863)
- Council Bluffs, Iowa (62,690)

Places with 10,000 to 49,999 inhabitants

- Papillion, Nebraska (25,127)
- La Vista, Nebraska (16,543)
- Chalco, Nebraska* (11,064)

Places with 5,000 to 9,999 inhabitants

- Gretna, Nebraska (9,207)
- Blair, Nebraska (7,997)
- Plattsmouth, Nebraska (6,955)
- Ralston, Nebraska (6,382)
- Offutt AFB, Nebraska* (5,363)
- Glenwood, Iowa (5,287)
- Wahoo, Nebraska (5,023)

Places with 1,000 to 4,999 inhabitants

- Carter Lake, Iowa (3,670)
- Ashland, Nebraska (3,483)
- Valley, Nebraska (3,412)
- Missouri Valley, Iowa (2,616)
- Beaver Lake, Nebraska* (2,114)
- Bennington, Nebraska (1,968)
- Woodbine, Iowa (1,705)
- Avoca, Iowa (1,661)
- Springfield, Nebraska (1,529)
- Oakland, Iowa (1,489)
- Yutan, Nebraska (1,451)
- Louisville, Nebraska (1,419)
- Buccaneer Bay, Nebraska* (1,418)
- Logan, Iowa (1,352)
- Arlington, Nebraska (1,329)
- Eagle, Nebraska (1,206)
- Fort Calhoun, Nebraska (1,108)
- Treynor, Iowa (1,088)
- Malvern, Iowa (1,073)
- Weeping Water, Nebraska (1,061)
- Dunlap, Iowa (partial) (1,030)

Places with fewer than 1,000 inhabitants

- Tabor, Iowa (partial) (985)
- Ceresco, Nebraska (982)
- Underwood, Iowa (955)
- Waterloo, Nebraska (917)
- Neola, Iowa (903)
- Carson, Iowa (757)
- Shelby, Iowa (partial) (727)
- Walnut, Iowa (715)
- Elmwood, Nebraska (684)
- Mead, Nebraska (628)
- Boys Town, Nebraska (616)
- Greenwood, Nebraska (616)
- Cedar Bluffs, Nebraska (615)
- Crescent, Iowa (615)
- Valparaiso, Nebraska (608)
- Minden, Iowa (567)
- Murray, Nebraska (502)
- Cedar Creek, Nebraska (476)
- Emerson, Iowa (400)
- Kennard, Nebraska (370)
- Mondamin, Iowa (332)
- Prague, Nebraska (292)
- Persia, Iowa (289)
- Modale, Iowa (282)
- Murdock, Nebraska (276)
- Macedonia, Iowa (263)
- Weston, Nebraska (250)
- Pisgah, Iowa (248)
- Silver City, Iowa (246)
- Herman, Nebraska (217)
- Union, Nebraska (200)
- Magnolia, Iowa (196)
- Hancock, Iowa (195)
- Avoca, Nebraska (187)
- Nehawka, Nebraska (178)
- Little Sioux, Iowa (177)
- Manley, Nebraska (174)
- Ithaca, Nebraska (156)
- Mineola, Iowa* (154)
- McClelland, Iowa (143)
- Henderson, Iowa (137)
- Washington, Nebraska (131)
- Lake Waconda, Nebraska* (127)
- Alvo, Nebraska (125)
- Morse Bluff, Nebraska (124)
- Colon, Nebraska (120)
- King Lake, Nebraska* (114)
- Leshara, Nebraska (114)
- Memphis, Nebraska (106)
- Wann, Nebraska* (102)
- Pacific Junction, Iowa (100)
- Melia, Nebraska* (98)
- South Bend, Nebraska (94)
- Bentley, Iowa* (93)
- Malmo, Nebraska (93)
- Weston, Iowa* (78)
- Venice, Nebraska* (75)
- California Junction, Iowa* (74)
- Beacon View, Nebraska* (55)
- La Platte, Nebraska* (50)
- Linoma Beach, Nebraska* (43)
- Richfield, Nebraska* (42)
- River Sioux, Iowa* (42)
- Loveland, Iowa* (36)

==== Annexations of formerly incorporated places by the City of Omaha ====
Annexations by the City of Omaha
Year	Former incorporated area name
1854	East Omaha, Nebraska
1877	Kountze Place
1877	Gifford Park
1877	Saratoga, Nebraska
1877	Near North Side, Omaha
1887	Sheelytown
1887	Bemis Park
1915	South Omaha, Nebraska
1915	Dundee, Nebraska
1917	Benson, Nebraska
1917	Florence, Nebraska
1971	Millard, Nebraska
2005	Elkhorn, Nebraska
