= Weston, Iowa =

- Census-designated place
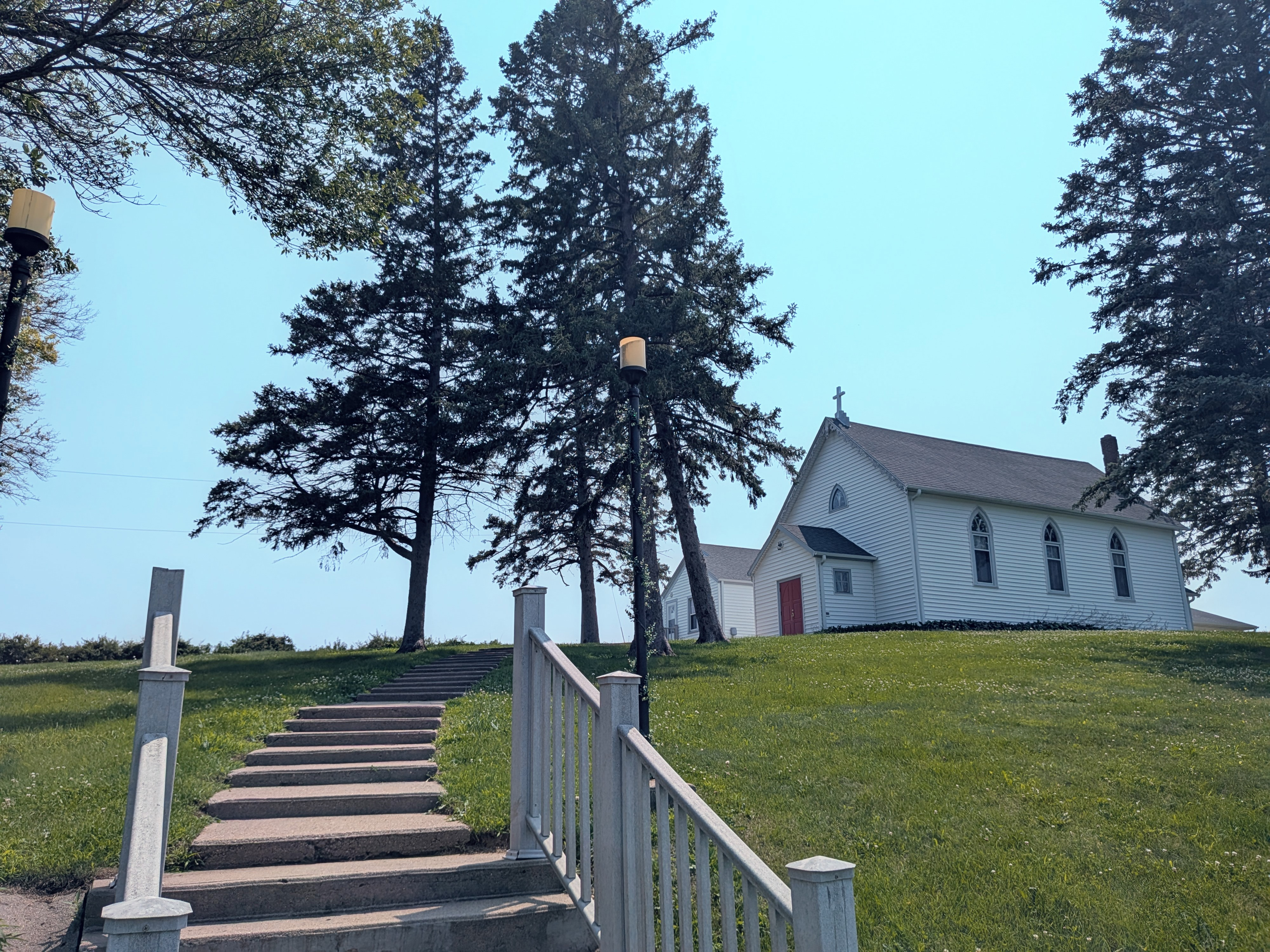
- Saint Columbanus Church in Weston

- Location in Iowa
- Coordinates: 41°20′26″N 95°44′26″W
- Country: United States
- State: Iowa
- County: Pottawattamie
- Township: Hazel Dell

Area
  - Total: 0.42 sq mi (1.10 km^{2})
  - Land: 0.42 sq mi (1.10 km^{2})
  - Water: 0 sq mi (0.00 km^{2})
- Elevation: 1,112 ft (339 m)

Population (2020)
  - Total: 78
  - Density: 182.8/sq mi (70.59/km^{2})
- Time zone: Central (CST)
- ZIP code: 51576
- Area code: 712
- FIPS code: 19-84495
- GNIS feature ID: 2583495

Weston is a census-designated place (CDP) located in the southeastern portion of Hazel Dell Township in Pottawattamie County in the state of Iowa. As of the 2020 census the population was 78.

Its location is between the cities of Council Bluffs and Underwood near Interstate 80.

== History ==
Weston was founded around 1837 when a few settlers drifted into the Indian’s territory. Although the settlers originally found this land of honey and rich soil, it was Joseph Moore, an ex-soldier from Ft. Leavenworth, Kansas that claimed the land which is now Weston.

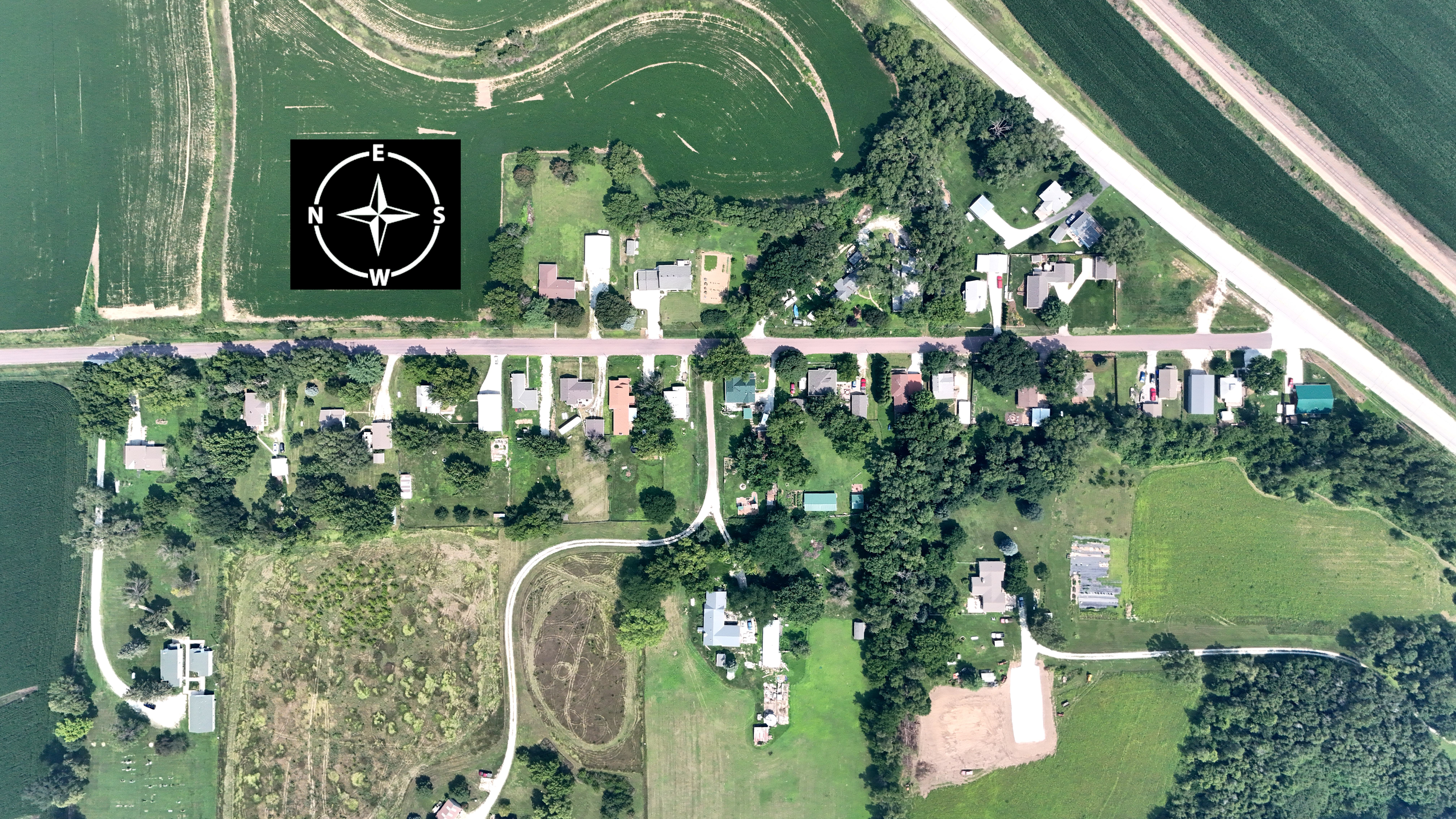
An aerial view of Weston, on July 13, 2025

== Demographics ==
Historical population
Census	Pop.	Note	%±
2010	92		—
2020	78		−15.2%
U.S. Decennial Census

=== 2020 census ===
As of the census of 2020, there were 78 people, 35 households, and 29 families residing in the community. The population density was 182.8 inhabitants per square mile (70.6/km^{2}). There were 35 housing units at an average density of 82.0 per square mile (31.7/km^{2}). The racial makeup of the community was 100.0% White, 0.0% Black or African American, 0.0% Native American, 0.0% Asian, 0.0% Pacific Islander, 0.0% from other races and 0.0% from two or more races. Hispanic or Latino persons of any race comprised 0.0% of the population.

Of the 35 households, 42.9% of which had children under the age of 18 living with them, 48.6% were married couples living together, 0.0% were cohabitating couples, 37.1% had a female householder with no spouse or partner present and 14.3% had a male householder with no spouse or partner present. 17.1% of all households were non-families. 14.3% of all households were made up of individuals, 14.3% had someone living alone who was 65 years old or older.

The median age in the community was 55.3 years. 17.9% of the residents were under the age of 20; 5.1% were between the ages of 20 and 24; 12.8% were from 25 and 44; 48.7% were from 45 and 64; and 15.4% were 65 years of age or older. The gender makeup of the community was 43.6% male and 56.4% female.
