= Boomer Township =

Boomer Township may refer to one of the following places in the United States:

- Boomer Township, Pottawattamie County, Iowa
- Boomer Township, Wilkes County, North Carolina
