= Norwalk Township =

Norwalk Township may refer to:

- Norwalk Township, Pottawattamie County, Iowa
- Norwalk Township, Huron County, Ohio
