= Bentley, Iowa =

- Census-designated place
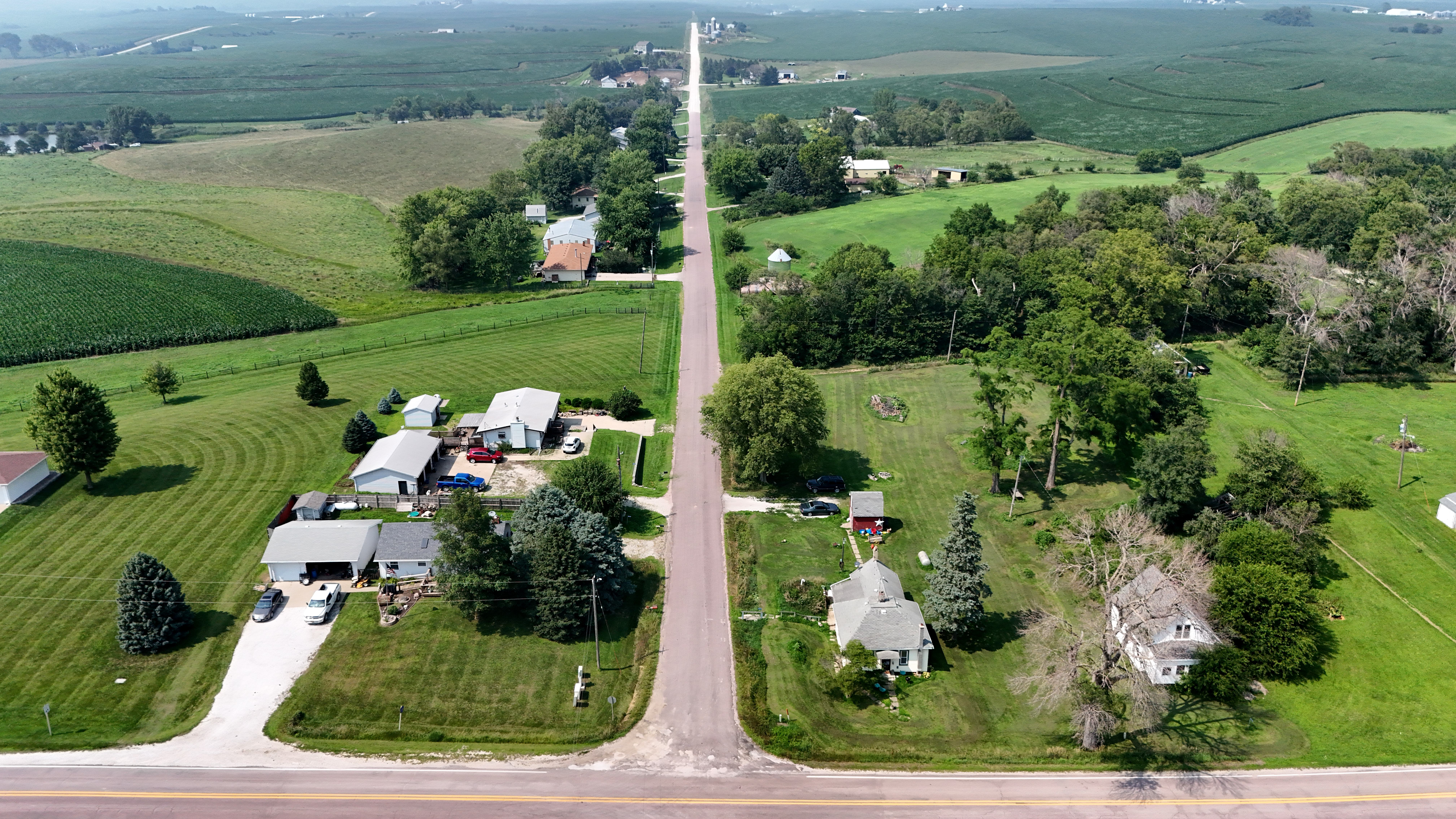
- A view (facing north) along 295th street as it passes through Bentley

- Location in Iowa
- Coordinates: 41°22′36″N 95°37′21″W
- Country: United States
- State: Iowa
- County: Pottawattamie
- Township: Norwalk

Area
  - Total: 1.03 sq mi (2.66 km^{2})
  - Land: 1.03 sq mi (2.66 km^{2})
  - Water: 0 sq mi (0.00 km^{2})
- Elevation: 1,263 ft (385 m)

Population (2020)
  - Total: 93
  - Density: 90.6/sq mi (34.98/km^{2})
- Time zone: Central (CST)
- FIPS code: 19-05870
- GNIS feature ID: 2583479

Bentley is a census-designated place (CDP) located in the eastern portion of Norwalk Township in Pottawattamie County in the state of Iowa, United States. As of the 2020 census the population was 93. Its location is approximately 4 miles (6 km) east of the city of Underwood.

Bentley had a post office from 1904 to 1965.

== Demographics ==
Historical population
Census	Pop.	Note	%±
2010	118		—
2020	93		−21.2%
U.S. Decennial Census

=== 2020 census ===
As of the census of 2020, there were 93 people, 38 households, and 22 families residing in the community. The population density was 90.6 inhabitants per square mile (35.0/km^{2}). There were 46 housing units at an average density of 44.8 per square mile (17.3/km^{2}). The racial makeup of the community was 95.7% White, 1.1% Black or African American, 2.2% Native American, 0.0% Asian, 0.0% Pacific Islander, 0.0% from other races and 1.1% from two or more races. Hispanic or Latino persons of any race comprised 1.1% of the population.

Of the 38 households, 28.9% of which had children under the age of 18 living with them, 44.7% were married couples living together, 0.0% were cohabitating couples, 39.5% had a female householder with no spouse or partner present and 15.8% had a male householder with no spouse or partner present. 42.1% of all households were non-families. 36.8% of all households were made up of individuals, 10.5% had someone living alone who was 65 years old or older.

The median age in the community was 47.4 years. 29.0% of the residents were under the age of 20; 3.2% were between the ages of 20 and 24; 15.1% were from 25 and 44; 37.6% were from 45 and 64; and 15.1% were 65 years of age or older. The gender makeup of the community was 61.3% male and 38.7% female.
