= Grove Township, Pottawattamie County, Iowa =

Township in Pottawattamie County, Iowa, U.S.

Coordinates: 41.203°N 95.327°W

Grove Township is a township in Pottawattamie County, Iowa, United States.

== History ==
Grove Township was established in 1858, having been partitioned from Macedonia Township. The name was chosen because of the groves of trees found within it. The Latter Day Saints formed the first church in the township, located in what eventually became known as South Wheeler. The community of Wheeler's Grove had its first church form in 1865. Wheeler's Grove was a thriving small town for many years, until modern transportation was built elsewhere, causing its demise. The village of Eminence was platted in 1875. The cemeteries in the township are: Center Ridge Cemetery, Mormon Cemetery, and Wheeler's Grove Cemetery (aka Cimetière de Wheeler Grove).
