= Kemling, Iowa =

- Unincorporated community
- Location within Iowa
- Coordinates: 41°09′59.97″N 95°16′42.98″W
- Country: United States
- State: Iowa
- County: Pottawattamie
- Time zone: UTC-6 (Central (CST))
  - Summer (DST): UTC-5 (CDT)
- Area code: 712
- GNIS feature ID: 464242

Kemling or Kemlingham is a ghost town in Pottawattamie County, in the U.S. state of Iowa.

== Geography ==
Kemling was located at 41°09′59.97″N 95°16′42.98″W, 8.5 miles east of Macedonia, Iowa.

== History ==
Kemling was founded as a post office on the Burlington Railroad. This post office operated from 1894 to 1901. After the post office closure, mail was routed through Macedonia.

By the early 1900s, Kemling was listed among other Iowa towns and villages in Iowa's legislative documents. Kemling's population was 10 in 1900.

The population of Kemling was 26 in 1915, 6 in 1925, and was just 4 persons in 1940.

== See also ==
Belknap, Iowa
