= Pleasant Township, Pottawattamie County, Iowa =

Pleasant Township
- Township
- Location within Iowa Location within the United States
- Coordinates: 41.4625°N 95.4408°W
- Country: United States
- State: Iowa
- County: Pottawattamie
- Organized: 1873

Pleasant Township is a township in Pottawattamie County, Iowa, United States. According to the Office of the Census of the United States, the township has a total surface of 92.35 square kilometer. About 251 people live in Pleasant Township. The population density is 2.72 inhabitants/km^{2}.

== History ==
Pleasant Township was established in 1873.
