= Hancock, Iowa =

- City
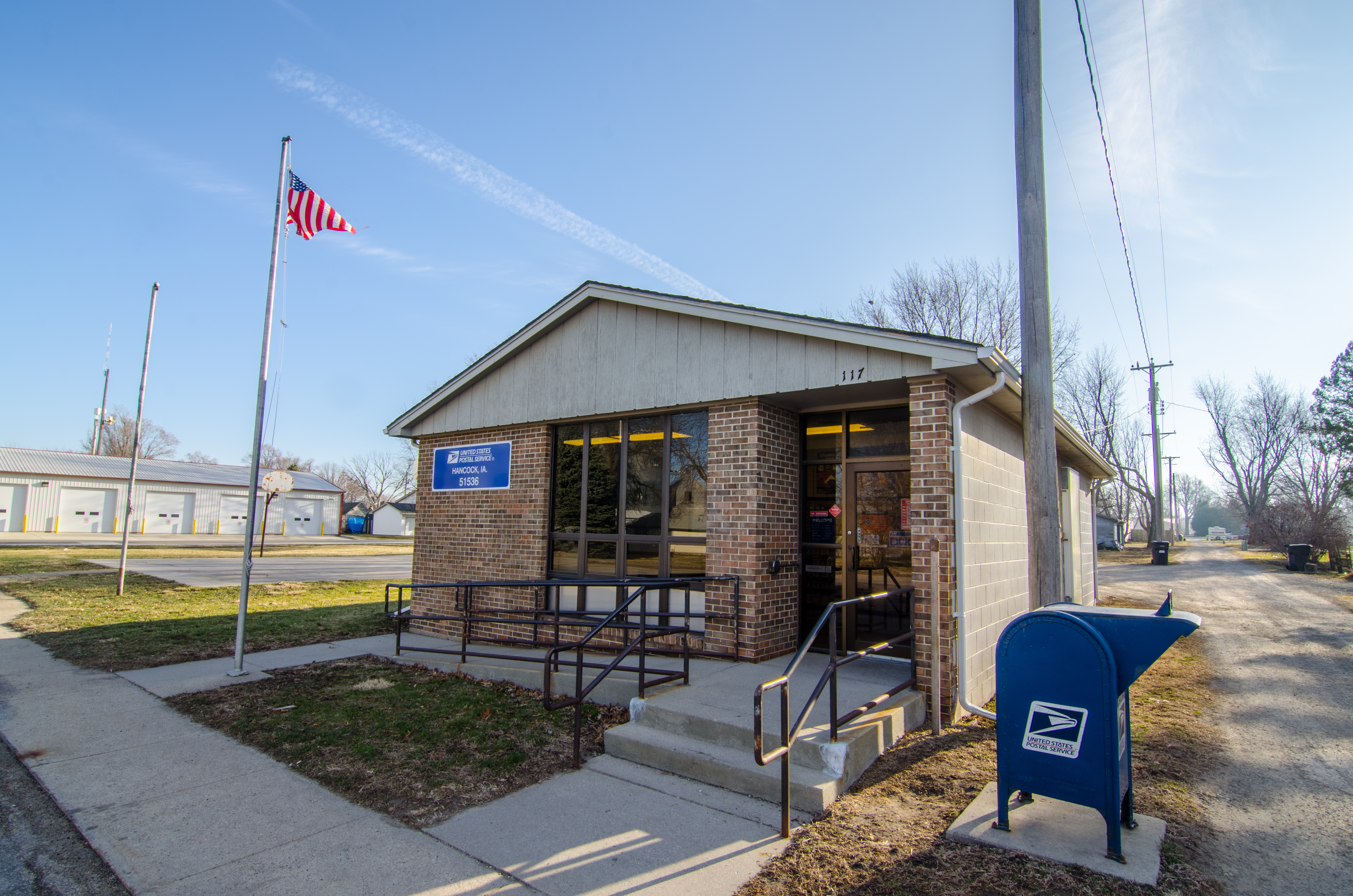
- Post Office in Hancock, Iowa

- Location of Hancock, Iowa

- Location within Iowa Location within the United States
- Coordinates: 41°23′33″N 95°21′49″W
- Country: USA
- State: Iowa
- County: Pottawattamie
- Township: Valley

Area
  - Total: 0.76 sq mi (1.97 km^{2})
  - Land: 0.72 sq mi (1.87 km^{2})
  - Water: 0.035 sq mi (0.09 km^{2})
- Elevation: 1,112 ft (339 m)

Population (2020)
  - Total: 200
  - Density: 276.7/sq mi (106.82/km^{2})
- Time zone: UTC-6 (Central (CST))
  - Summer (DST): UTC-5 (CDT)
- ZIP code: 51536
- Area code: 712
- FIPS code: 19-34005
- GNIS feature ID: 2394284

Hancock is a city in Pottawattamie County, Iowa, United States, along the West Nishnabotna River. The population was 200 at the time of the 2020 census.

== History ==
Hancock got its start in the year 1880, following construction of the Rock Island Railroad through the territory. It was named for its founder, F. H. Hancock.

== Geography ==
According to the United States Census Bureau, the city has a total area of 0.78 square miles (2.02 km^{2}), of which 0.75 square miles (1.94 km^{2}) is land and 0.03 square miles (0.08 km^{2}) is water.

== Demographics ==
Historical populations
Year	Pop.	±%
1890	167	—
1900	276	+65.3%
1910	250	−9.4%
1920	276	+10.4%
1930	312	+13.0%
1940	256	−17.9%
1950	264	+3.1%
1960	252	−4.5%
1970	228	−9.5%
1980	254	+11.4%
1990	201	−20.9%
2000	207	+3.0%
2010	196	−5.3%
2020	200	+2.0%
Source:"U.S. Census website". United States Census Bureau. and Iowa Data Center; Source: U.S. Decennial Census

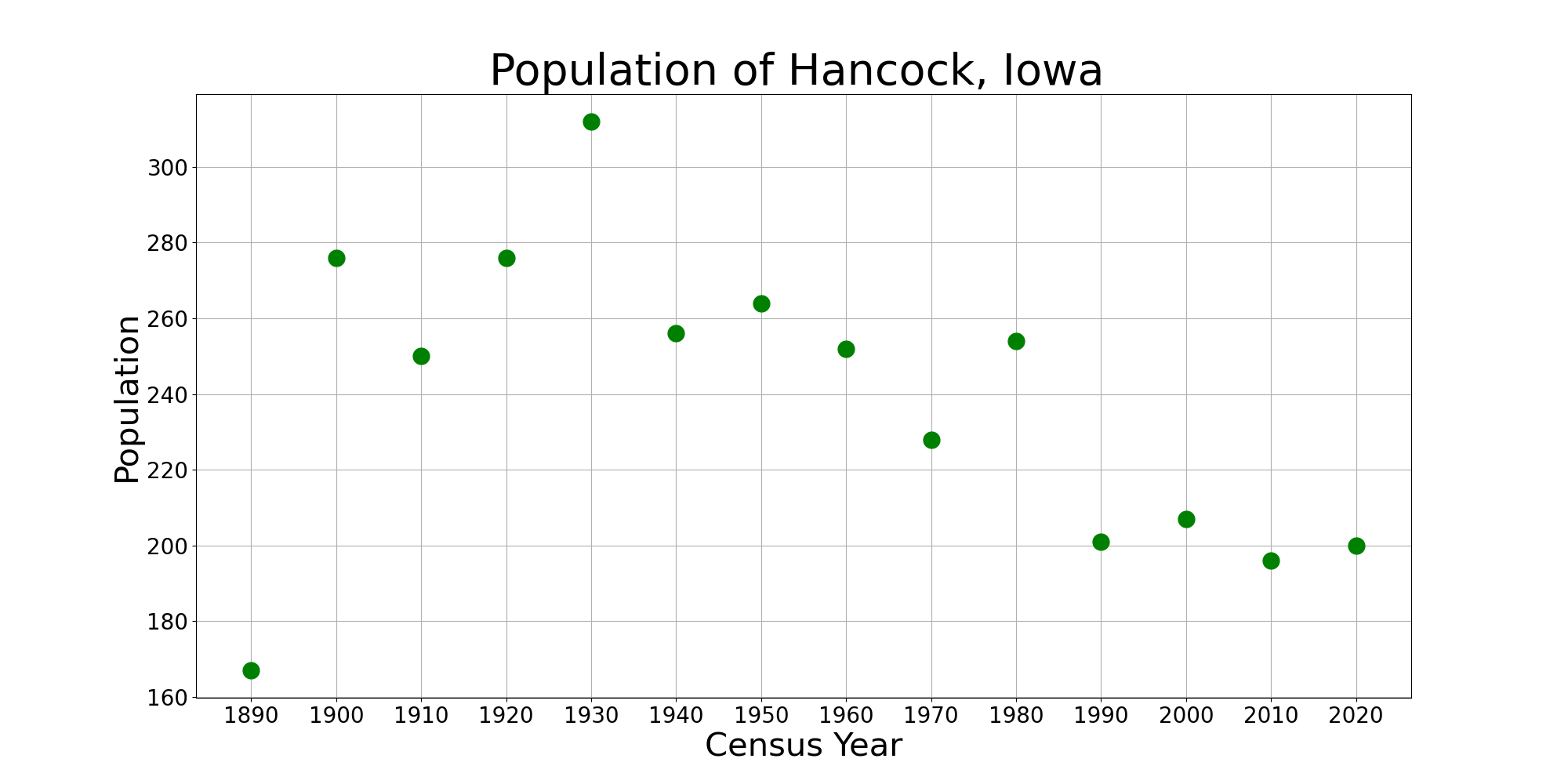
The population of Hancock, Iowa from US census data

=== 2020 census ===
As of the census of 2020, there were 200 people, 83 households, and 53 families residing in the city. The population density was 276.7 inhabitants per square mile (106.8/km^{2}). There were 90 housing units at an average density of 124.5 per square mile (48.1/km^{2}). The racial makeup of the city was 88.5% White, 0.0% Black or African American, 2.0% Native American, 0.0% Asian, 0.0% Pacific Islander, 1.0% from other races and 8.5% from two or more races. Hispanic or Latino persons of any race comprised 2.5% of the population.

Of the 83 households, 33.7% of which had children under the age of 18 living with them, 47.0% were married couples living together, 6.0% were cohabitating couples, 27.7% had a female householder with no spouse or partner present and 19.3% had a male householder with no spouse or partner present. 36.1% of all households were non-families. 31.3% of all households were made up of individuals, 20.5% had someone living alone who was 65 years old or older.

The median age in the city was 46.8 years. 23.5% of the residents were under the age of 20; 6.0% were between the ages of 20 and 24; 17.0% were from 25 and 44; 30.0% were from 45 and 64; and 23.5% were 65 years of age or older. The gender makeup of the city was 47.5% male and 52.5% female.

=== 2010 census ===
As of the census of 2010, there were 196 people, 88 households, and 62 families living in the city. The population density was 261.3 inhabitants per square mile (100.9/km^{2}). There were 95 housing units at an average density of 126.7 per square mile (48.9/km^{2}). The racial makeup of the city was 95.9% White, 0.5% Native American, 2.0% from other races, and 1.5% from two or more races. Hispanic or Latino of any race were 2.6% of the population.

There were 88 households, of which 26.1% had children under the age of 18 living with them, 55.7% were married couples living together, 6.8% had a female householder with no husband present, 8.0% had a male householder with no wife present, and 29.5% were non-families. 23.9% of all households were made up of individuals, and 13.6% had someone living alone who was 65 years of age or older. The average household size was 2.23 and the average family size was 2.53.

The median age in the city was 48 years. 18.4% of residents were under the age of 18; 4.6% were between the ages of 18 and 24; 23% were from 25 to 44; 32.1% were from 45 to 64; and 21.9% were 65 years of age or older. The gender makeup of the city was 50.0% male and 50.0% female.

=== 2000 census ===
As of the census of 2000, there were 207 people, 90 households, and 68 families living in the city. The population density was 277.1 inhabitants per square mile (107.0/km^{2}). There were 97 housing units at an average density of 129.9 per square mile (50.2/km^{2}). The racial makeup of the city was 99.52% White and 0.48% Native American. Hispanic or Latino of any race were 0% of the population.

There were 90 households, out of which 21.1% had children under the age of 18 living with them, 61.1% were married couples living together, 8.9% had a female householder with no husband present, and 24.4% were non-families. 22.2% of all households were made up of individuals, and 13.3% had someone living alone who was 65 years of age or older. The average household size was 2.30 and the average family size was 2.68.

16.4% are under the age of 18, 10.1% from 18 to 24, 23.2% from 25 to 44, 30.4% from 45 to 64, and 19.8% who were 65 years of age or older. The median age was 48 years. For every 100 females, there were 99.0 males. For every 100 females age 18 and over, there were 96.6 males.

The median income for a household in the city was $33,056, and the median income for a family was $37,500. Males had a median income of $31,429 versus $19,083 for females. The per capita income for the city was $17,200. About 2.6% of families and 2.5% of the population were below the poverty line, including 9.3% of those under the age of eighteen and none of those 65 or over.

== Education ==
The community is served by the AHSTW Community School District. It was in the Hancock-Avoca Community School District until July 1, 1996, when that district merged into the A-H-S-T Community School District. That one in turn merged into AHSTW on July 1, 2016.

== Notable people ==
- Rebecca Ann King, 1974 Miss America.
