= Lincoln Township, Pottawattamie County, Iowa =

Township in Pottawattamie County, Iowa, U.S.

Coordinates: 41.375°N 95.213°W

Lincoln Township is a township in Pottawattamie County, Iowa, United States.

== History ==
Lincoln Township was organized in 1876.
