= Neola Township, Pottawattamie County, Iowa =

Township in Pottawattamie County, Iowa, U.S.

Coordinates: 41.463°N 95.669°W

Neola Township is a township in Pottawattamie County, Iowa, United States.

== History ==
Neola Township was established in 1872.
