= Knox Township, Pottawattamie County, Iowa =

Township in Pottawattamie County, Iowa, U.S.

Coordinates: 41.462°N 95.327°W

Knox Township is a township in Pottawattamie County, Iowa, United States.

== History ==
Knox Township was organized in 1855.
