= Wright Township, Pottawattamie County, Iowa =

Township in Pottawattamie County, Iowa, U.S.

Coordinates: 41.289°N 95.212°W

Wright Township is a township in Pottawattamie County, Iowa, United States.

== History ==
Wright Township was established in 1873.
