= Garner Township, Pottawattamie County, Iowa =

Township in Pottawattamie County, Iowa, U.S.

Coordinates: 41.29°N 95.77°W

Garner Township is a township in Pottawattamie County, Iowa, United States.

== History ==
Garner Township is named for William Garner, a pioneer settler.
