= Washington Township, Pottawattamie County, Iowa =

Township in Pottawattamie County, Iowa, U.S.

Coordinates: 41.289°N 95.556°W

Washington Township is a township in Pottawattamie County, Iowa, United States.

== History ==
Washington Township was organized in 1870.
