= Silver Creek Township, Pottawattamie County, Iowa =

Silver Creek Township
- Township
- Location within Iowa Location within the United States
- Coordinates: 41.203°N 95.556°W
- Country: United States
- State: Iowa
- County: Pottawattamie
- Organized: 1858

Silver Creek Township is a township in Pottawattamie County, Iowa, United States.

== History ==
Silver Creek Township was organized in 1858.
