= Waveland Township, Pottawattamie County, Iowa =

Township in Pottawattamie County, Iowa, U.S.

Coordinates: 41.202°N 95.213°W

Waveland Township is a township in Pottawattamie County, Iowa, United States.

== History ==
Waveland Township was organized in 1857. It was originally called Walnut Creek Township.
