= Riverside Community School District =

Public school district in Carson, Iowa, United States

Coordinates: 41.238095°N 95.419059°W

Location
- Carson, Iowa Pottawattamie County United States
- Coordinates: 41.238095, -95.419059

District information
- Type: Local school district
- Grades: K-12
- Established: 1993
- Superintendent: Dr. Stephanie Anderson
- Schools: 3
- Budget: $12,272,000 (2020-21)
- NCES District ID: 1900027

Students and staff
- Students: 693 (2022-23)
- Teachers: 47.22 FTE
- Staff: 67.63 FTE
- Student–teacher ratio: 14.68
- Athletic conference: Western Iowa
- District mascot: Bulldogs
- Colors: Navy and Gold

Other information
- Website: www.riversideschools.org

Riverside Community School District is a rural public school district headquartered in Carson, Iowa, within the district's grade 3-5 facility.

The district, entirely in Pottawattamie County, serves Carson, Oakland, Macedonia and the surrounding rural areas.

The school's teams are the Bulldogs, and the colors are navy and gold. The fight song is The Victors.

== History ==
The district formed on July 1, 1993, with the merger of the Carson-Macedonia and Oakland districts.

Circa 2004, Jim Sutton became the superintendent. Before 2012 the district attempted to get two school bonds to replace the high school but voters rejected both measures. Sutton in 2012 asked voters to accept another proposal. A bond valued $15.1 million finally passed in June 2013, with Sutton expressing gratitude. 1,096 voters, including 367 absentee voters approved the measure; as there were 1,805 voters total, including 501 absentee voters, the approval percentage was slightly higher than the 60% necessary to pass the bond.

Sutton left his position in 2016 to work at the Belle Plaine Unified School District 357, citing proximity to his family. Dr. Timothy Mitchell, previously the superintendent of Rapid City Area Schools, became superintendent of Riverside in 2016. Dr. Timothy Mitchell retired at the end of 2023 school year. Dr. Stephanie Anderson was hired by the school board on April 7, 2023. Dr. Anderson is the former director of elementary education and student services at the Fort Dodge Community School District.

== Schools ==
Oakland Elementary School is in Oakland, and the Carson Elementary School is in Carson.

The Riverside grade 6-12 Junior/Senior High School is south of Oakland in an unincorporated area, in proximity to the junction of Highway 6 and Highway 59. Construction began on this building in April 2014, which had delays due to summer weather. Previously the high school was in the city of Oakland.

Previously there was a 4-5 school in Macedonia.

=== Riverside Community High School ===
==== Athletics ====
The Bulldogs compete in the Western Iowa Conference in the following sports:

- Cross Country
- Volleyball
- Football
- Basketball
- Wrestling
  - 1996 Class 1A State Champions
- Track and Field
  - 2026 Class 1A State Champions
- Golf
- Soccer
- Baseball
- Softball

== 2017 Oakland, school bus fire ==
On December 12, 2017, a school bus owned and operated by the District was involved in a road run-off event and subsequent fire near Oakland, Iowa. The crash occurred when a school bus driver turned from a rural gravel road onto a residential driveway for student pickup. After the student boarded the bus, the driver reversed out of the driveway and backed across the road continuing until the bus's rear wheels ran off the road. The bus came to rest with its rear half in a 3-foot-deep ditch next to the road. While the driver attempted to drive the bus out of the ditch, a fire began in the engine compartment and spread throughout the school bus. The driver and the only passenger – a female 16-year-old student – died when they did not egress from the burning bus.

The accident was the subject of a lengthy National Transportation Safety Board investigation. That resulting investigation was highly critical of the District. Among his opening remarks at the June 18, 2019 Board hearing regarding the accident and the driver's impaired physical condition, Chairman Robert Sumwalt stated, "[t]he Riverside Community School District had the knowledge it needed to act. It did not. In fact, in recent years, it had gone so far as to do away with physical performance tests for drivers." The final report identified the probably cause as, "(1) the driver’s failure to control the bus, backing it into a roadside ditch for reasons that could not be established; and (2) the failure of the Riverside Community School District to provide adequate oversight by allowing a driver to operate a school bus with a known physical impairment that limited his ability to perform emergency duties."

== See also ==
- List of school districts in Iowa
- List of high schools in Iowa
