= York Township, Pottawattamie County, Iowa =

Township in Pottawattamie County, Iowa, U.S.

Coordinates: 41.3780°N 95.5553°W

York Township is a township in Pottawattamie County, Iowa, United States.

== History ==
York Township was organized about 1856.
