= McClelland, Iowa =

- City
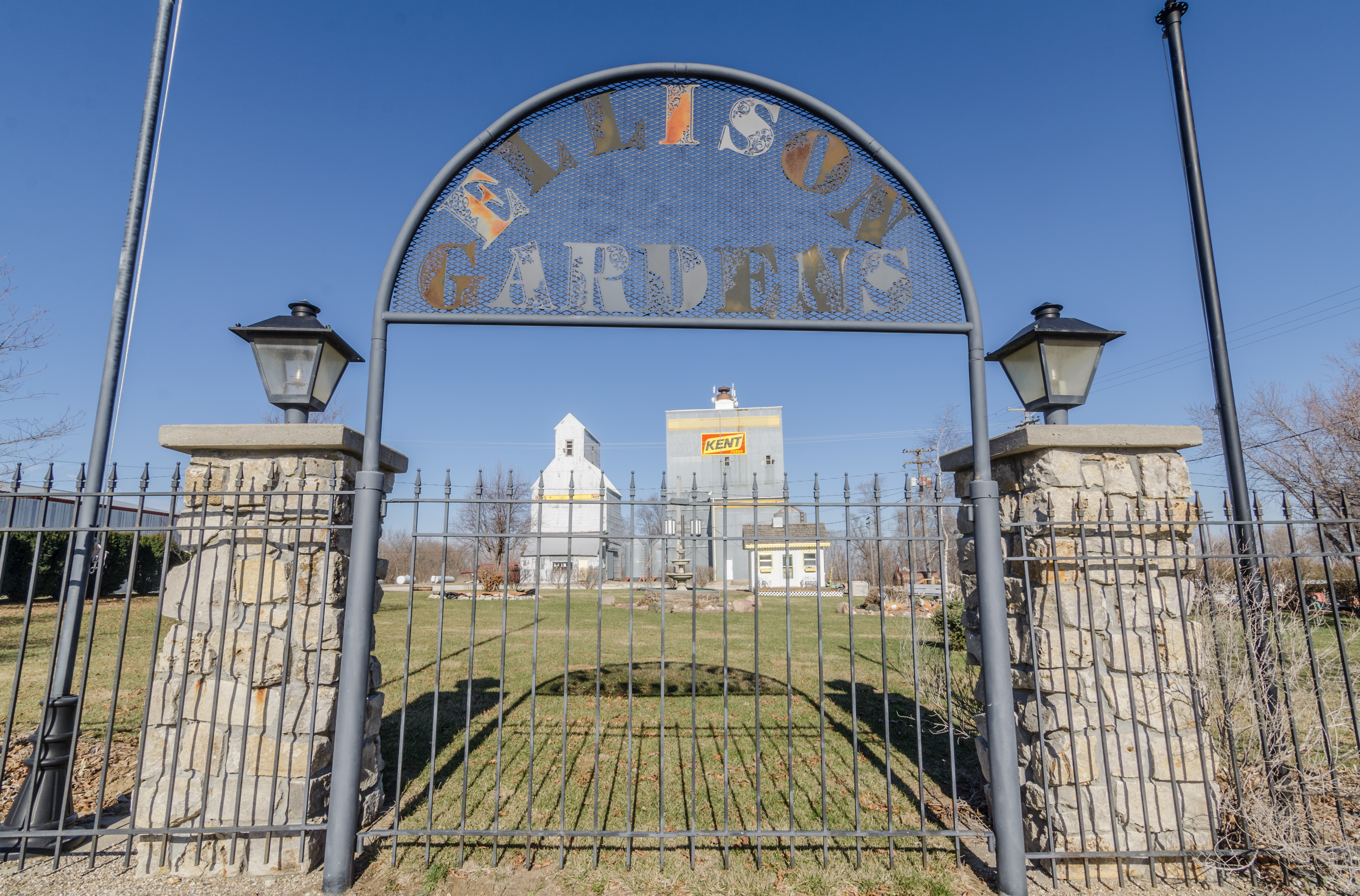
- Ellison Gardens in McClelland, Iowa

- Location of McClelland, Iowa

- Location within Iowa Location within the United States
- Coordinates: 41°19′54″N 95°40′53″W
- Country: USA
- State: Iowa
- County: Pottawattamie
- Township: Hardin

Area
  - Total: 0.27 sq mi (0.71 km^{2})
  - Land: 0.27 sq mi (0.71 km^{2})
  - Water: 0 sq mi (0.00 km^{2})
- Elevation: 1,247 ft (380 m)

Population (2020)
  - Total: 146
  - Density: 534.2/sq mi (206.27/km^{2})
- Time zone: UTC-6 (Central (CST))
  - Summer (DST): UTC-5 (CDT)
- ZIP code: 51548
- Area code: 712
- FIPS code: 19-47865
- GNIS feature ID: 2395060
- Website: cityofmcclelland.us

McClelland is a city in Pottawattamie County, Iowa, United States. The city was founded in 1903 after the Great Western Railroad was extended to include Council Bluffs. The population was 146 at the time of the 2020 census.

== Geography ==
According to the United States Census Bureau, the city has a total area of 0.17 square miles (0.44 km^{2}), all land.

== Demographics ==
Historical populations
Year	Pop.	±%
1910	134	—
1920	142	+6.0%
1930	161	+13.4%
1940	165	+2.5%
1950	159	−3.6%
1960	150	−5.7%
1970	146	−2.7%
1980	177	+21.2%
1990	139	−21.5%
2000	129	−7.2%
2010	151	+17.1%
2020	146	−3.3%
Source:"U.S. Census website". United States Census Bureau. and Iowa Data Center; Source: U.S. Decennial Census

=== 2020 census ===
As of the census of 2020, there were 146 people, 54 households, and 44 families residing in the city. The population density was 534.2 inhabitants per square mile (206.3/km^{2}). There were 56 housing units at an average density of 204.9 per square mile (79.1/km^{2}). The racial makeup of the city was 98.6% White, 0.0% Black or African American, 0.0% Native American, 0.7% Asian, 0.0% Pacific Islander, 0.7% from other races and 0.0% from two or more races. Hispanic or Latino persons of any race comprised 0.7% of the population.

Of the 54 households, 31.5% of which had children under the age of 18 living with them, 68.5% were married couples living together, 5.6% were cohabitating couples, 16.7% had a female householder with no spouse or partner present and 9.3% had a male householder with no spouse or partner present. 18.5% of all households were non-families. 16.7% of all households were made up of individuals, 5.6% had someone living alone who was 65 years old or older.

The median age in the city was 45.5 years. 23.3% of the residents were under the age of 20; 6.8% were between the ages of 20 and 24; 18.5% were from 25 and 44; 35.6% were from 45 and 64; and 15.8% were 65 years of age or older. The gender makeup of the city was 50.0% male and 50.0% female.

=== 2010 census ===
As of the census of 2010, there were 151 people, 54 households, and 45 families living in the city. The population density was 888.2 inhabitants per square mile (342.9/km^{2}). There were 56 housing units at an average density of 329.4 per square mile (127.2/km^{2}). The racial makeup of the city was 94.0% White, 1.3% African American, 0.7% from other races, and 4.0% from two or more races. Hispanic or Latino of any race were 2.0% of the population.

There were 54 households, of which 38.9% had children under the age of 18 living with them, 70.4% were married couples living together, 9.3% had a female householder with no husband present, 3.7% had a male householder with no wife present, and 16.7% were non-families. 13.0% of all households were made up of individuals, and 3.7% had someone living alone who was 65 years of age or older. The average household size was 2.80 and the average family size was 3.02.

The median age in the city was 36.5 years. 28.5% of residents were under the age of 18; 7.9% were between the ages of 18 and 24; 28.4% were from 25 to 44; 28.5% were from 45 to 64; and 6.6% were 65 years of age or older. The gender makeup of the city was 45.7% male and 54.3% female.

=== 2000 census ===
As of the census of 2000, there were 129 people, 50 households, and 35 families living in the city. The population density was 803.7 inhabitants per square mile (310.3/km^{2}). There were 51 housing units at an average density of 317.7 per square mile (122.7/km^{2}). The racial makeup of the city was 97.67% White, and 2.33% from two or more races. Hispanic or Latino of any race were 0.78% of the population.

There were 50 households, out of which 34.0% had children under the age of 18 living with them, 56.0% were married couples living together, 6.0% had a female householder with no husband present, and 30.0% were non-families. 18.0% of all households were made up of individuals, and none had someone living alone who was 65 years of age or older. The average household size was 2.58 and the average family size was 2.89.

In the city, the population was spread out, with 26.4% under the age of 18, 5.4% from 18 to 24, 35.7% from 25 to 44, 24.0% from 45 to 64, and 8.5% who were 65 years of age or older. The median age was 38 years. For every 100 females, there were 101.6 males. For every 100 females age 18 and over, there were 115.9 males.

The median income for a household in the city was $41,625, and the median income for a family was $41,875. Males had a median income of $29,531 versus $28,438 for females. The per capita income for the city was $22,155. There were no families and 2.3% of the population living below the poverty line, including no under eighteens and none of those over 64.

== Education ==
The Underwood Community School District serves McClelland.
