= Lewis Township, Pottawattamie County, Iowa =

Township in Pottawattamie County, Iowa, U.S.

Coordinates: 41.205°N 95.816°W

Lewis Township is a township in Pottawattamie County, Iowa, United States.

== Demographics ==
As of the 2010 census, the population of Lewis Township was 12,065. The gender makeup of the township was 49% male and 51% female. 28% of the population were under the age of 18; 50% were between the ages of 18 and 64; and 22% were 65 years of age or older.

== History ==
Lewis Township is named for the Lewis brothers, pioneer settlers.
