= Underwood Community School District =

Public school district in Underwood, Iowa, United States

Coordinates: 41.385503°N 95.682435°W

Location
- Underwood, Iowa Pottawattamie County United States
- Coordinates: 41.385503, -95.682435

District information
- Type: Local school district
- Motto: Preparing students to meet the challenges of the 21st Century
- Grades: K-12
- Superintendent: Andy Irwin
- Schools: 3
- Budget: $11,264,000 (2020-21)
- NCES District ID: 1928230

Students and staff
- Students: 833 (2022-23)
- Teachers: 55.04 FTE
- Staff: 59.35 FTE
- Student–teacher ratio: 15.13
- Athletic conference: Western Iowa
- District mascot: Eagles
- Colors: Royal Blue and White

Other information
- Website: www.underwoodeagles.org

The Underwood Community School District is a rural public school district located in Underwood, Iowa, United States. The first school in the district was built in 1863, in Downsville, Iowa. The school was moved to Underwood, Iowa in 1903 following the incorporation of the town and subsequent abandonment of Downsville. In 1926, the high school was founded. The district headquarters are in the elementary-middle school, while the high school is a separate building. The district, entirely in Pottawattamie County, serves Underwood and McClelland.

The school mascot is the eagles and the colors are royal blue and white.

In 2006, the original Middle School was torn down and a new building was constructed as an addition to Underwood Elementary School. In 2014, Underwood High School saw a lot of significant remodeling.

== Schools ==
The district operates three schools, all in Underwood:

- Underwood Elementary School
- Underwood Middle School
- Underwood High School

=== Underwood High School ===
==== Athletics ====
The Eagles compete in the Western Iowa Conference in the following sports:

- Cross Country
  - Boys' 4-time State Champions (1952, 1953, 1954, 1959)
- Volleyball
- Football
- Basketball
  - Girls' 2-time Class 2A State Champions (2003, 2004)
- Wrestling
  - 3-time Class 1A State Champions (1998, 1999, 2000)
- Track and Field
  - Boys' 2021 Class 2A State Champions
- Golf
- Soccer
- Baseball
  - Boys' 2024 Class 2A State Champions
- Softball

== See also ==
- List of school districts in Iowa
- List of high schools in Iowa
