= James Township, Pottawattamie County, Iowa =

Township in Pottawattamie County, Iowa, U.S.

Coordinates: 41.375°N 95.441°W

James Township is a township in Pottawattamie County, Iowa, United States.

== History ==
James Township was organized in 1858.
