= Pottawattamie County, Iowa =

County in Iowa, United States

- County
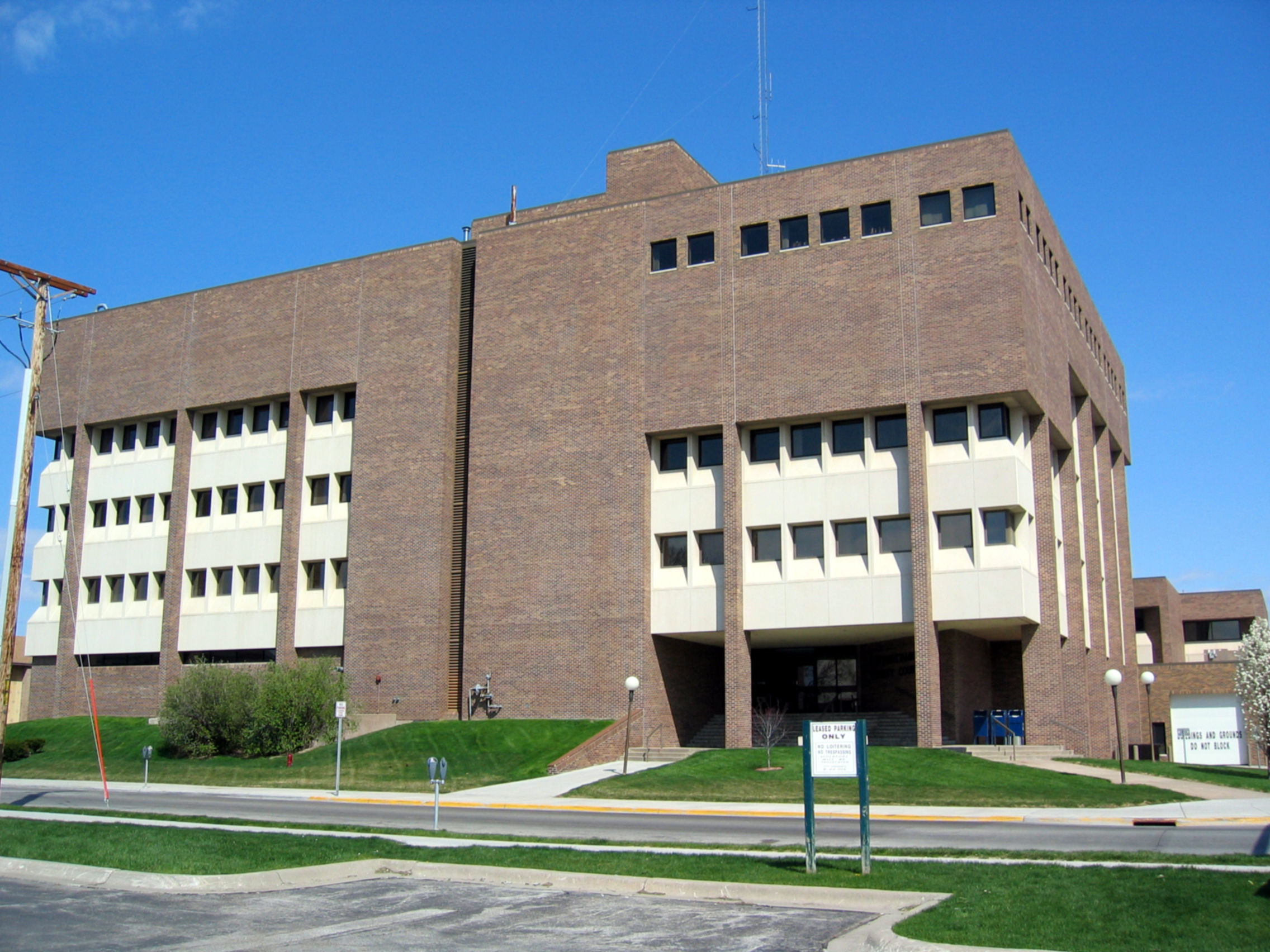
- The Pottawattamie County Courthouse in Council Bluffs

- Location within the U.S. state of Iowa
- Coordinates: 41.340184°N 95.544905°W
- Country: United States
- State: Iowa
- Created: February 24, 1847
- Organized: September 21, 1848
- Named for: Potawatomi tribe
- Seat: Council Bluffs
- Largest city: Council Bluffs

Area
  - Total: 959.144 sq mi (2,484.17 km^{2})
  - Land: 951.284 sq mi (2,463.81 km^{2})
  - Water: 7.860 sq mi (20.36 km^{2}) 0.82%

Population (2020)
  - Total: 93,667
  - Estimate (2025): 92,996 ▼
  - Density: 98.464/sq mi (38.017/km^{2})
- Time zone: UTC−6 (Central)
  - Summer (DST): UTC−5 (CDT)
- Area code: 712
- Congressional district: 4th
- Website: pottcounty-ia.gov
- Iowa county number 78

Pottawattamie County (/ˌpɑːtəˈwɑːtəmiː/) is a county located in the U.S. state of Iowa. At the 2020 census, its population was 93,667, and was estimated to be 92,996 in 2025, making it the tenth-most populous county in Iowa. The county takes its name from the Potawatomi Native American tribe. The county seat and the largest city is Council Bluffs.

Pottawattamie County is included in the Omaha–Council Bluffs metropolitan area.

== History ==
Pottawattamie County was formed on January 15, 1851 and organized on September 21, 1848.

== Geography ==
According to the United States Census Bureau, the county has a total area of 959.144 square miles (2,484.17 km^{2}), of which 951.284 square miles (2,463.81 km^{2}) is land and 7.860 square miles (20.36 km^{2}) (0.82%) is water. It is the second-largest county in Iowa by total area after Kossuth County. Pottawattamie County is located within Iowa's Loess Hills and was the site of Kanesville along the Mormon Trail.

In 2023, Pottawattamie County had the highest corn production in Iowa and the U.S., with over 47 million bushels produced.

Due to movement of the Missouri River and a Supreme Court ruling, part of the county, Carter Lake, actually lies on the far side of the Missouri River. This part of the county cannot be reached by road without entering Nebraska; no direct bridge exists.

=== Major highways ===
- Interstate 29
- Interstate 80
- Interstate 480
- Interstate 680
- Interstate 880
- U.S. Highway 6
- U.S. Highway 59
- U.S. Highway 275
- Iowa Highway 83
- Iowa Highway 92
- Iowa Highway 165
- Iowa Highway 191
- Iowa Highway 192

=== Adjacent counties ===
- Harrison County (north)
- Shelby County (northeast)
- Cass County (east)
- Montgomery County (southeast)
- Mills County (south)
- Sarpy County, Nebraska (southwest)
- Douglas County, Nebraska (west)
- Washington County, Nebraska (northwest)

=== National protected area ===
- DeSoto National Wildlife Refuge (part)

== Demographics ==
Historical population
Census	Pop.	Note	%±
1850	7,828		—
1860	4,968		−36.5%
1870	16,893		240.0%
1880	39,850		135.9%
1890	47,430		19.0%
1900	54,336		14.6%
1910	55,832		2.8%
1920	61,550		10.2%
1930	69,888		13.5%
1940	66,756		−4.5%
1950	69,682		4.4%
1960	83,102		19.3%
1970	86,991		4.7%
1980	86,561		−0.5%
1990	82,628		−4.5%
2000	87,704		6.1%
2010	93,158		6.2%
2020	93,667		0.5%
2024 (est.)	92,996	▼	−0.7%
U.S. Decennial Census; 1790–1960 1900–1990; 1990–2000 2010–2020

As of the second quarter of 2025, the median home value in Pottawattamie County was $236,314.

As of the 2024 American Community Survey, there are 37,530 estimated households in Pottawattamie County with an average of 2.44 persons per household. The county has a median household income of $73,074. Approximately 17.4% of the county's population lives at or below the poverty line. Pottawattamie County has an estimated 59.5% employment rate, with 21.4% of the population holding a bachelor's degree or higher and 89.7% holding a high school diploma. There were 40,327 housing units at an average density of 42.39 per square mile (16.4/km^{2}).

The median age in the county was 39.7 years.

Pottawattamie County, Iowa – racial and ethnic composition Note: the US Census treats Hispanic/Latino as an ethnic category. This table excludes Latinos from the racial categories and assigns them to a separate category. Hispanics/Latinos may be of any race.
Race / ethnicity (NH = non-Hispanic)	Pop. 1980	Pop. 1990	Pop. 2000	Pop. 2010	Pop. 2020
White alone (NH)	84,419 (97.53%)	80,148 (97.00%)	82,667 (94.26%)	83,609 (89.75%)	79,181 (84.53%)
Black or African American alone (NH)	438 (0.51%)	453 (0.55%)	658 (0.75%)	1,216 (1.31%)	1,836 (1.96%)
Native American or Alaska Native alone (NH)	171 (0.20%)	222 (0.27%)	280 (0.32%)	334 (0.36%)	391 (0.42%)
Asian alone (NH)	227 (0.26%)	272 (0.33%)	421 (0.48%)	549 (0.59%)	773 (0.83%)
Pacific Islander alone (NH)	—	—	14 (0.02%)	25 (0.03%)	76 (0.08%)
Other race alone (NH)	99 (0.11%)	17 (0.02%)	33 (0.04%)	36 (0.04%)	278 (0.30%)
Mixed race or multiracial (NH)	—	—	739 (0.84%)	1,238 (1.33%)	3,472 (3.71%)
Hispanic or Latino (any race)	1,207 (1.39%)	1,516 (1.83%)	2,892 (3.30%)	6,151 (6.60%)	7,660 (8.18%)
Total	86,561 (100.00%)	82,628 (100.00%)	87,704 (100.00%)	93,158 (100.00%)	93,667 (100.00%)

=== 2024 estimate ===
As of the 2024 estimate, there were 93,529 people, 37,530 households, and _ families residing in the county. The population density was 98.32 inhabitants per square mile (38.0/km^{2}). There were 40,327 housing units at an average density of 42.39 per square mile (16.4/km^{2}). The racial makeup of the county was 93.3% White (84.4% NH White), 2.1% African American, 0.9% Native American, 1.1% Asian, 0.2% Pacific Islander, _% from some other races and 2.3% from two or more races. Hispanic or Latino people of any race were 10.1% of the population.

=== 2020 census ===
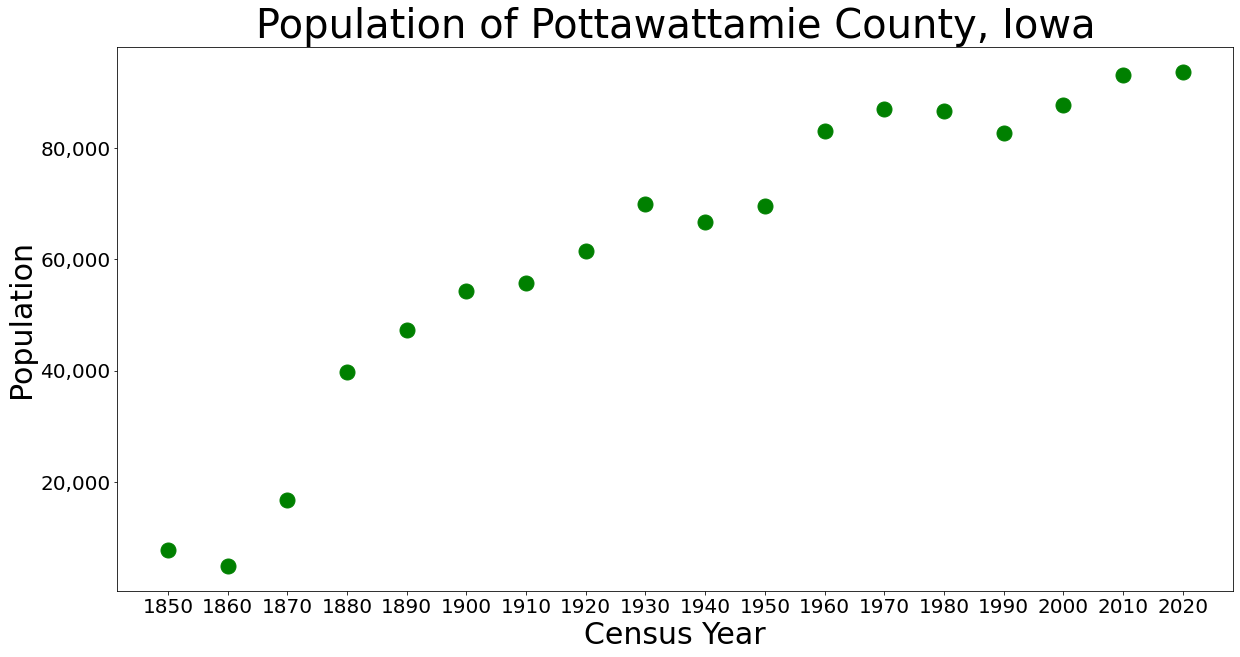
Population of Pottawattamie County from the U.S. census data

As of the 2020 census, there were 93,667 people, 37,284 households, and 24,169 families residing in the county. The population density was 98.46 inhabitants per square mile (38.0/km^{2}). There were 39,852 housing units at an average density of 41.89 per square mile (16.2/km^{2}). The racial makeup of the county was 86.83% White, 2.02% African American, 0.70% Native American, 0.84% Asian, 0.09% Pacific Islander, 3.62% from some other races and 5.91% from two or more races. Hispanic or Latino people of any race were 8.18% of the population.

The median age was 40.1 years. 23.3% of residents were under the age of 18 and 18.1% of residents were 65 years of age or older. For every 100 females there were 98.3 males, and for every 100 females age 18 and over there were 96.3 males age 18 and over.

73.1% of residents lived in urban areas, while 26.9% lived in rural areas.

There were 37,284 households in the county, of which 29.6% had children under the age of 18 living in them. Of all households, 46.0% were married-couple households, 19.5% were households with a male householder and no spouse or partner present, and 26.8% were households with a female householder and no spouse or partner present. About 28.8% of all households were made up of individuals and 12.1% had someone living alone who was 65 years of age or older.

Of the county's 39,852 housing units, 6.4% were vacant. Among occupied housing units, 67.6% were owner-occupied and 32.4% were renter-occupied. The homeowner vacancy rate was 1.4% and the rental vacancy rate was 6.7%.

=== 2010 census ===
As of the 2010 census, there were 93,158 people, 36,775 households, and _ families residing in the county. The population density was 97.93 inhabitants per square mile (37.8/km^{2}). There were 39,330 housing units at an average density of 41.34 per square mile (16.0/km^{2}). The racial makeup of the county was 92.92% White, 1.36% African American, 0.47% Native American, 0.61% Asian, 0.03% Pacific Islander, 2.71% from some other races and 1.90% from two or more races. Hispanic or Latino people of any race were 6.60% of the population.

=== 2000 census ===
As of the 2000 census, there were 87,704 people, 33,844 households and 23,623 families residing in the county. The population density was 92.20 inhabitants per square mile (35.6/km^{2}). There were 35,761 housing units at an average density of 37.59 per square mile (14.5/km^{2}). The racial makeup of the county was 95.98% White, 0.77% African American, 0.37% Native American, 0.48% Asian, 0.02% Pacific Islander, 1.27% from some other races and 1.11% from two or more races. Hispanic or Latino people of any race were 3.30% of the population.

There were 33,844 households, of which 32.30% had children under the age of 18 living with them, 53.60% were married couples living together, 11.80% had a female householder with no husband present and 30.20% were non-families. 24.90% of all households were made up of individuals, and 10.00% had someone living alone who was 65 years of age or older. The average household size was 2.54 and the average family size was 3.03.

26.00% of the population were under the age of 18, 9.10% from 18 to 24, 28.60% from 25 to 44, 22.70% from 45 to 64, and 13.70% who were 65 years of age or older. The median age was 36 years. For every 100 females there were 95.50 males. For every 100 females age 18 and over, there were 92.60 males.

The median household income was $40,089 and the median family income was $47,105. Males had a median income of $31,642 and females $24,243. The per capita income was $19,275. About 6.40% of families and 8.40% of the population were below the poverty line, including 11.00% of those under age 18 and 6.30% of those age 65 or over.

== Communities ==
=== Cities ===
- Avoca
- Carson
- Carter Lake
- Council Bluffs
- Crescent
- Hancock
- Macedonia
- McClelland
- Minden
- Neola
- Oakland
- Treynor
- Underwood
- Walnut

=== Unincorporated communities ===
- Dumfries
- Honey Creek
- Kemling

=== Census-designated places ===
- Bentley
- Loveland
- Weston

=== Townships ===
- Belknap
- Boomer
- Carson
- Center
- Crescent
- Garner
- Grove
- Hardin
- Hazel Dell
- James
- Kane
- Keg Creek
- Knox
- Lake
- Layton
- Lewis
- Lincoln
- Macedonia
- Minden
- Neola
- Norwalk
- Pleasant
- Rockford
- Silver Creek
- Valley
- Washington
- Waveland
- Wright
- York

=== Population ranking ===
The population ranking of the following table is based on the 2020 census of Pottawattamie County.

† county seat

Rank	City/Town/etc.	Municipal type	Population (2020 Census)	Population (2024 Estimate)
1	† Council Bluffs	City	62,799	62,665
2	Carter Lake	City	3,791	3,752
3	Avoca	City	1,683	1,685
4	Oakland	City	1,524	1,519
5	Treynor	City	1,032	1,104
6	Underwood	City	954	973
7	Neola	City	918	917
8	Carson	City	766	772
9	Walnut	City	747	728
10	Crescent	City	628	626
11	Minden	City	600	581
12	Macedonia	City	267	266
13	Hancock	City	200	199
14	Bentley	CDP	93	185
15	Weston	CDP	78	167
16	McClelland	City	146	147
17	Loveland	CDP	36	46
18	Shelby (Mostly in Shelby County)	City	11 (727 total)	11 (730 total)

== Law enforcement ==
Pottawattamie County is served by the Pottawattamie County Sheriff's Office consisting of 51 sworn deputies, 13 reserve deputies, 92 detention officers and eight civilian support staff. Its headquarters is located in Council Bluffs, Iowa.

== Politics ==
Pottawattamie County is a strongly Republican county. The county last backed a Democratic presidential candidate in 1964 as the party won nationally by a landslide and only voted Democratic in four other elections prior to that. Some recent elections were more competitive, with Barack Obama losing the county in 2008 by less than 1,000 votes. However, Donald Trump won the county by 21% in 2016, by 17% in 2020, and by 20% in 2024.

United States presidential election results for Pottawattamie County, Iowa
Year	Republican		Democratic		Third party(ies)	
Year	No.	%	No.	%	No.	%
1896	5,810	51.00%	5,468	48.00%	114	1.00%
1900	6,525	54.14%	5,373	44.58%	154	1.28%
1904	6,868	61.14%	3,731	33.21%	634	5.64%
1908	6,137	51.16%	5,520	46.02%	338	2.82%
1912	1,753	14.77%	4,993	42.08%	5,120	43.15%
1916	5,992	47.83%	6,263	49.99%	274	2.19%
1920	13,506	64.66%	6,659	31.88%	722	3.46%
1924	13,380	52.78%	5,305	20.93%	6,667	26.30%
1928	14,354	58.91%	9,905	40.65%	109	0.45%
1932	9,565	35.94%	16,674	62.65%	377	1.42%
1936	12,223	42.28%	16,259	56.23%	431	1.49%
1940	15,929	51.07%	15,221	48.80%	38	0.12%
1944	14,007	54.25%	11,752	45.52%	59	0.23%
1948	12,384	51.40%	11,430	47.44%	281	1.17%
1952	18,894	61.24%	11,897	38.56%	63	0.20%
1956	17,632	57.87%	12,731	41.78%	105	0.34%
1960	19,223	57.79%	14,025	42.17%	13	0.04%
1964	14,208	44.68%	17,569	55.25%	22	0.07%
1968	16,038	56.47%	9,495	33.43%	2,866	10.09%
1972	19,722	69.32%	8,074	28.38%	654	2.30%
1976	17,264	53.09%	14,754	45.37%	501	1.54%
1980	20,222	60.96%	10,709	32.29%	2,239	6.75%
1984	21,527	63.11%	12,329	36.14%	256	0.75%
1988	17,193	53.06%	14,958	46.16%	254	0.78%
1992	15,671	42.22%	13,228	35.64%	8,216	22.14%
1996	15,648	47.68%	13,276	40.45%	3,897	11.87%
2000	18,783	54.50%	14,726	42.72%	958	2.78%
2004	24,558	58.72%	16,906	40.43%	356	0.85%
2008	21,237	50.18%	20,436	48.28%	651	1.54%
2012	21,860	51.68%	19,644	46.44%	797	1.88%
2016	24,447	57.28%	15,355	35.98%	2,878	6.74%
2020	26,247	57.38%	18,575	40.61%	922	2.02%
2024	26,335	59.10%	17,468	39.20%	756	1.70%

== Education ==
School districts include:

- Atlantic Community School District, Atlantic
- AHSTW Community School District, Avoca
- Council Bluffs Community School District, Council Bluffs
- Glenwood Community School District, Glenwood
- Griswold Community School District, Griswold
- Lewis Central Community School District, Council Bluffs
- Missouri Valley Community School District, Missouri Valley
- Red Oak Community School District, Red Oak
- Riverside Community School District, Carson
- Treynor Community School District, Treynor
- Tri-Center Community School District, Neola
- Underwood Community School District, Underwood

There is also a state-operated school, Iowa School for the Deaf.

Former school districts:

- A-H-S-T Community School District, Avoca
- Walnut Community School District, Walnut

== Notable people ==
- Nina Korgan (1916–2009), women’s fast-pitch softball pitcher

== See also ==
- National Register of Historic Places listings in Pottawattamie County, Iowa
