= Center Township, Pottawattamie County, Iowa =

Township in Pottawattamie County, Iowa, U.S.

Coordinates: 41.2888°N 95.3270°W

Center Township is a township in Pottawattamie County, Iowa, United States.

== History ==
Center Township was organized in 1856.
