= Carson, Iowa =

- City
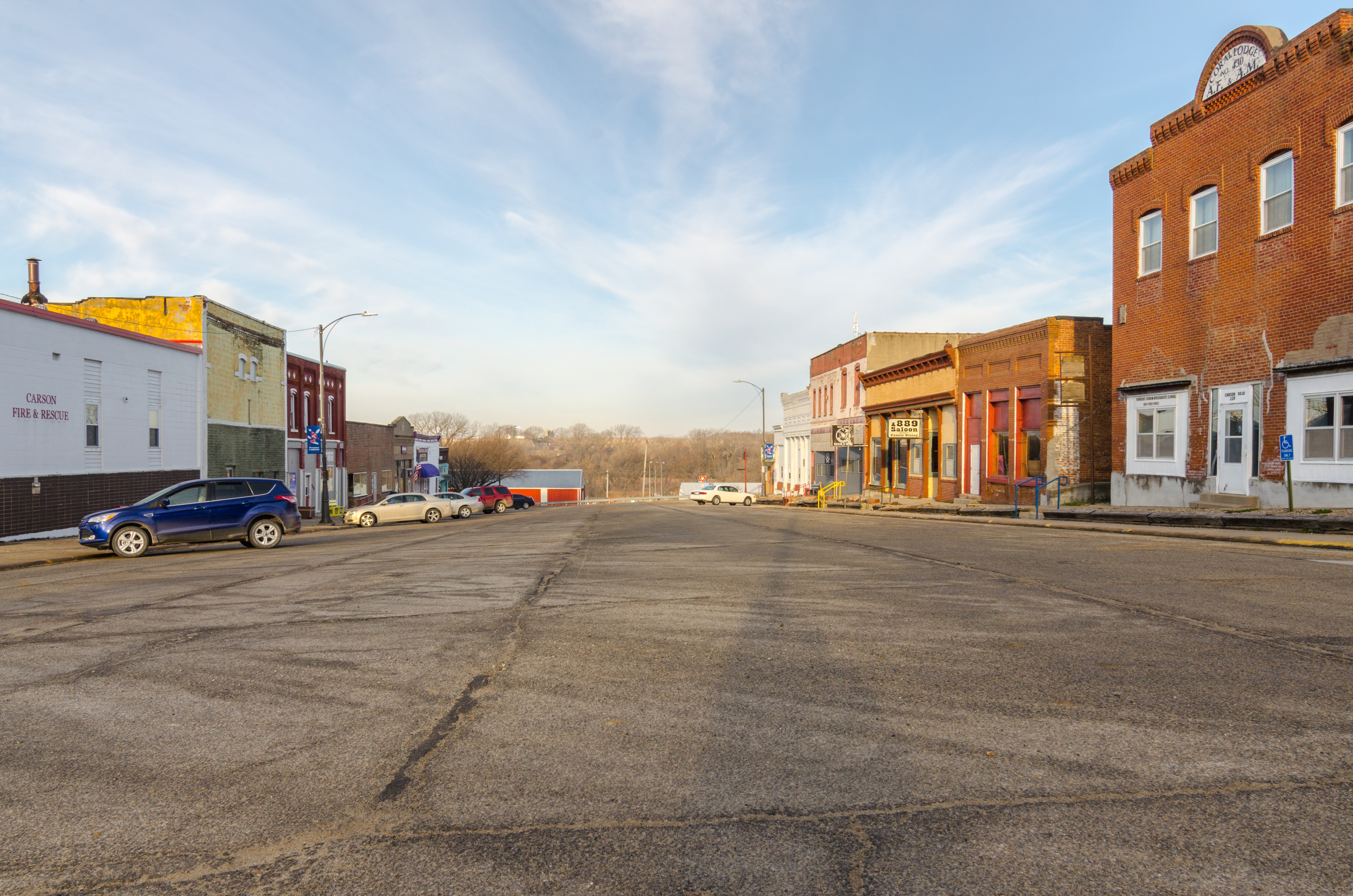
- Downtown Carson, Iowa

- Location of Carson, Iowa
- Coordinates: 41°14′08″N 95°25′11″W
- Country: USA
- State: Iowa
- County: Pottawattamie

Government
  - Type: Mayor-council

Area
  - Total: 0.65 sq mi (1.69 km^{2})
  - Land: 0.65 sq mi (1.69 km^{2})
  - Water: 0 sq mi (0.00 km^{2})
- Elevation: 1,119 ft (341 m)

Population (2020)
  - Total: 766
  - Density: 1,173.2/sq mi (452.99/km^{2})
- Time zone: UTC-6 (Central (CST))
  - Summer (DST): UTC-5 (CDT)
- ZIP code: 51525
- Area code: 712
- FIPS code: 19-11170
- GNIS feature ID: 2393755
- Website: www.carsongov.com

Carson is a city in Pottawattamie County, Iowa, United States. The population was 766 at the 2020 census. Carson has a number of interesting and historic places.

== History ==
Carson was formed in 1881 as a result of the establishment of a depot on the Burlington and Rock Island Railroad at this location during the previous year. Carson is within the Riverside Community School District. The district formed on July 1, 1993 with the merger of the Carson-Macedonia and Oakland districts.

== Geography ==
The city is located along the West Nishnabotna River.

According to the United States Census Bureau, the city has a total area of 0.71 square miles (1.84 km^{2}), all land.

== Demographics ==
Historical populations
Year	Pop.	±%
1890	391	—
1900	632	+61.6%
1910	640	+1.3%
1920	692	+8.1%
1930	617	−10.8%
1940	613	−0.6%
1950	596	−2.8%
1960	583	−2.2%
1970	756	+29.7%
1980	716	−5.3%
1990	705	−1.5%
2000	668	−5.2%
2010	812	+21.6%
2020	766	−5.7%
Source:"U.S. Census website". United States Census Bureau. and Iowa Data Center; Source: U.S. Decennial Census

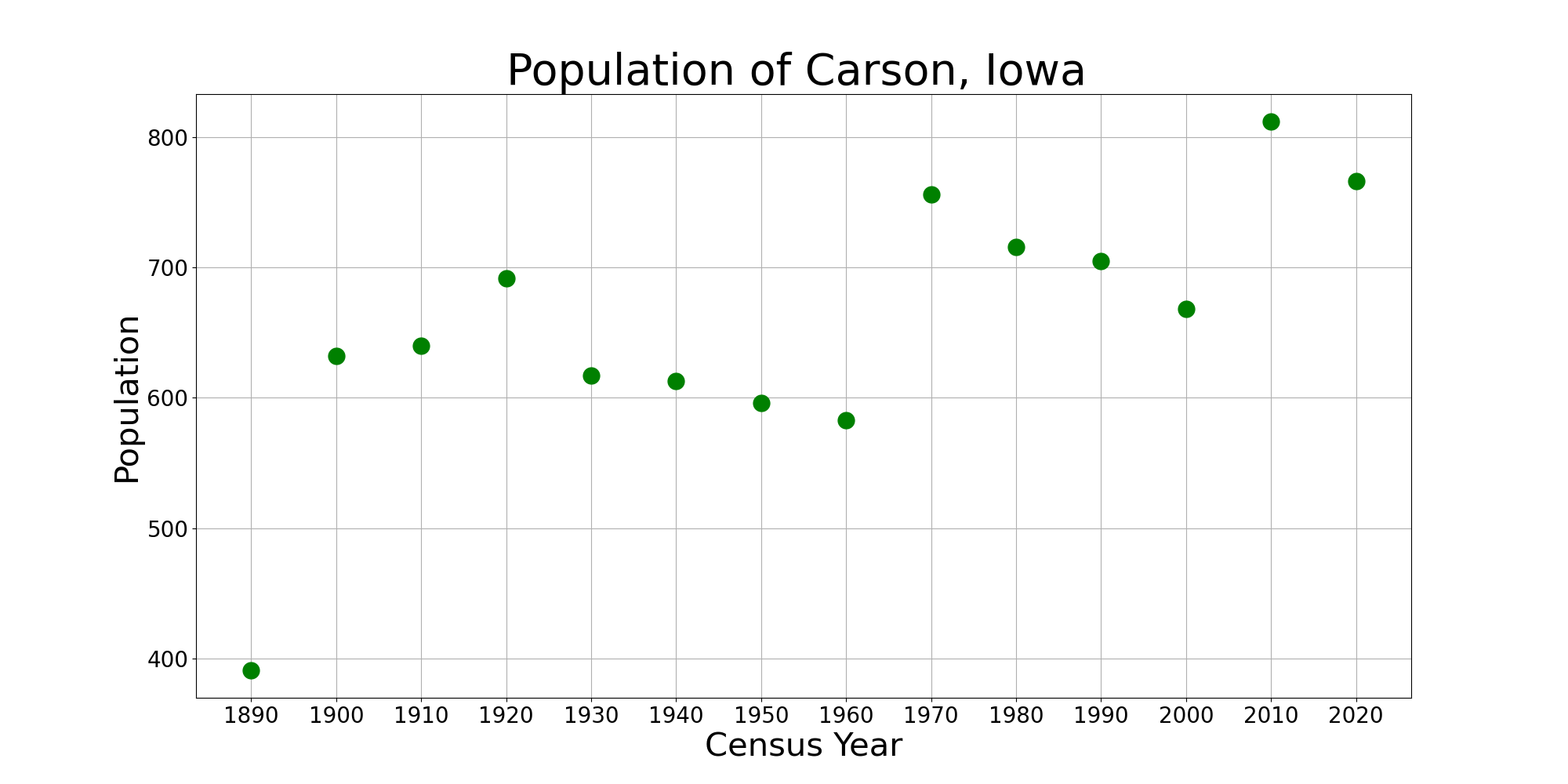
The population of Carson, Iowa from US census data

=== 2020 census ===
As of the census of 2020, there were 766 people, 317 households, and 214 families residing in the city. The population density was 1,173.2 inhabitants per square mile (453.0/km^{2}). There were 347 housing units at an average density of 531.5 per square mile (205.2/km^{2}). The racial makeup of the city was 95.6% White, 0.9% Black or African American, 0.3% Native American, 0.3% Asian, 0.0% Pacific Islander, 0.8% from other races and 2.2% from two or more races. Hispanic or Latino persons of any race comprised 2.5% of the population.

Of the 317 households, 34.1% of which had children under the age of 18 living with them, 48.9% were married couples living together, 4.4% were cohabitating couples, 25.2% had a female householder with no spouse or partner present and 21.5% had a male householder with no spouse or partner present. 32.5% of all households were non-families. 28.7% of all households were made up of individuals, 16.7% had someone living alone who was 65 years old or older.

The median age in the city was 41.9 years. 27.8% of the residents were under the age of 20; 4.4% were between the ages of 20 and 24; 23.5% were from 25 and 44; 21.9% were from 45 and 64; and 22.3% were 65 years of age or older. The gender makeup of the city was 48.7% male and 51.3% female.

=== 2010 census ===
As of the census of 2010, there were 812 people, 325 households, and 228 families living in the city. The population density was 1,143.7 inhabitants per square mile (441.6/km^{2}). There were 353 housing units at an average density of 497.2 per square mile (192.0/km^{2}). The racial makeup of the city was 98.8% White, 0.2% Native American, 0.1% Asian, and 0.9% from two or more races. Hispanic or Latino of any race were 2.3% of the population.

There were 325 households, of which 32.3% had children under the age of 18 living with them, 60.3% were married couples living together, 6.8% had a female householder with no husband present, 3.1% had a male householder with no wife present, and 29.8% were non-families. 25.8% of all households were made up of individuals, and 11% had someone living alone who was 65 years of age or older. The average household size was 2.50 and the average family size was 3.01.

The median age in the city was 39.3 years. 25.2% of residents were under the age of 18; 5.6% were between the ages of 18 and 24; 25.8% were from 25 to 44; 27.1% were from 45 to 64; and 16.4% were 65 years of age or older. The gender makeup of the city was 46.4% male and 53.6% female.

=== 2000 census ===
As of the census of 2000, there were 668 people, 285 households, and 200 families living in the city. The population density was 1,277.6 inhabitants per square mile (493.3/km^{2}). There were 309 housing units at an average density of 591.0 per square mile (228.2/km^{2}). The racial makeup of the city was 99.10% White, 0.15% Asian, 0.30% from other races, and 0.45% from two or more races.

There were 285 households, out of which 27.7% had children under the age of 18 living with them, 60.0% were married couples living together, 8.1% had a female householder with no husband present, and 29.8% were non-families. 26.3% of all households were made up of individuals, and 14.0% had someone living alone who was 65 years of age or older. The average household size was 2.34 and the average family size was 2.83.

22.2% are under the age of 18, 8.5% from 18 to 24, 25.6% from 25 to 44, 25.7% from 45 to 64, and 18.0% who were 65 years of age or older. The median age was 40 years. For every 100 females, there were 86.6 males. For every 100 females age 18 and over, there were 87.7 males.

The median income for a household in the city was $41,719, and the median income for a family was $50,000. Males had a median income of $35,804 versus $21,071 for females. The per capita income for the city was $18,831. About 4.9% of families and 8.0% of the population were below the poverty line, including 10.6% of those under age 18 and 13.6% of those age 65 or over.

== Notable person ==
- Hubert Houser (born 1942), Iowa State Senator from the 49th District
