= Valley Township, Pottawattamie County, Iowa =

Township in Pottawattamie County, Iowa, U.S.

Coordinates: 41.375°N 95.327°W

Valley Township is a township in Pottawattamie County, Iowa, United States.

== History ==
Valley Township is named from its setting in the Nishnabotna Valley.
