= Loveland, Iowa =

- Census-designated place
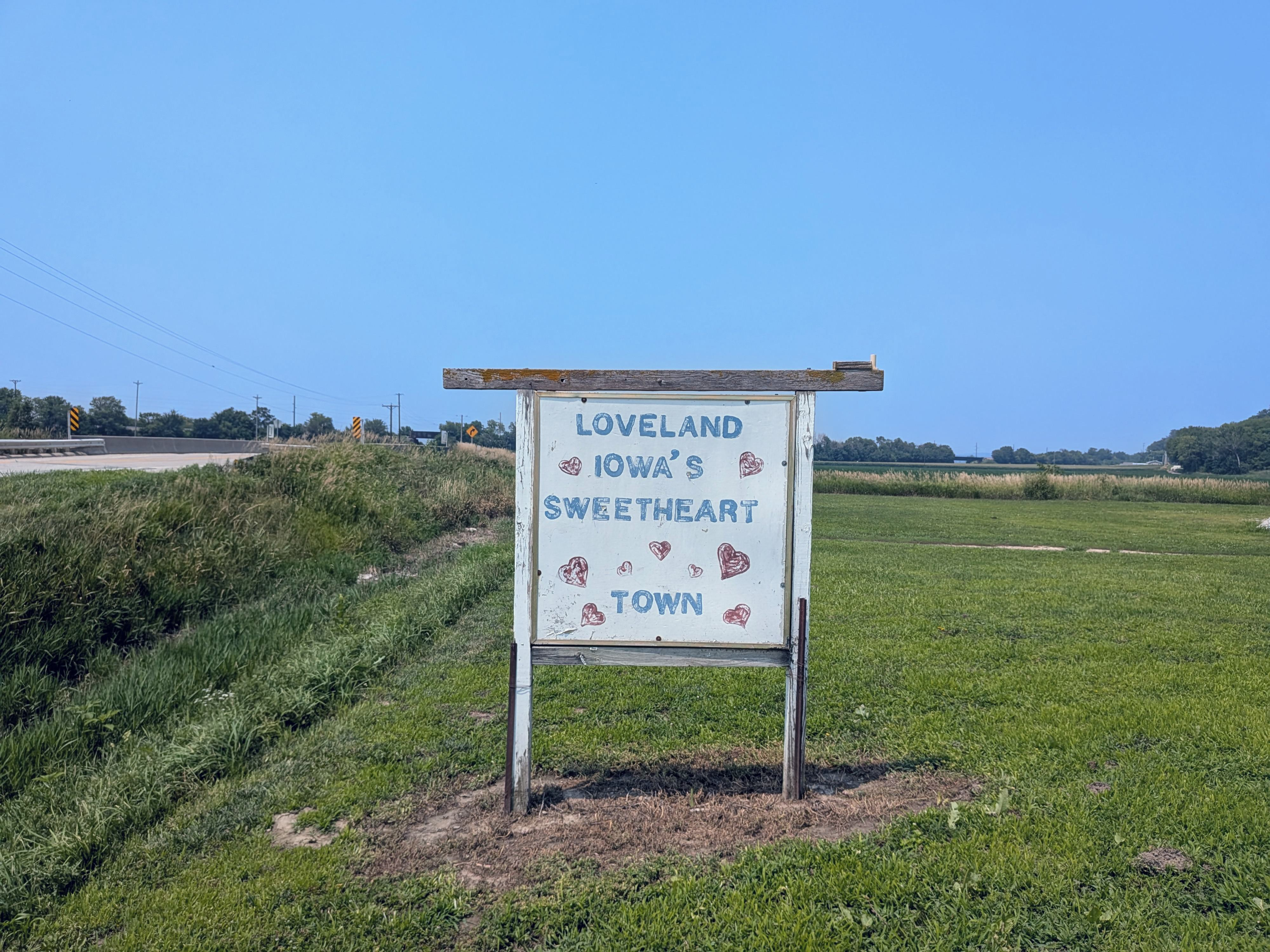
- Welcome Sign outside of Loveland

- Location within Iowa
- Coordinates: 41°29′49″N 95°53′25″W
- Country: United States
- State: Iowa
- County: Pottawattamie

Area
  - Total: 0.039 sq mi (0.10 km^{2})
  - Land: 0.039 sq mi (0.10 km^{2})
  - Water: 0 sq mi (0.00 km^{2})
- Elevation: 1,017 ft (310 m)

Population (2020)
  - Total: 36
  - Density: 915.4/sq mi (353.45/km^{2})
- Time zone: UTC-6 (Central (CST))
  - Summer (DST): UTC-5 (CDT)
- Area code: 712
- GNIS feature ID: 2583486

Loveland is a census-designated place (CDP) in Pottawattamie County, Iowa, United States.

As of the 2020 census, Loveland had a population of 36.

== History ==
Loveland got its start in the 1860s, following construction of the Chicago and North Western Railway through the territory. It was named for E. Loveland, who owned the land where the community is located. Loveland's population was 95 in 1902, and 160 in 1925. The population was 120 in 1940.

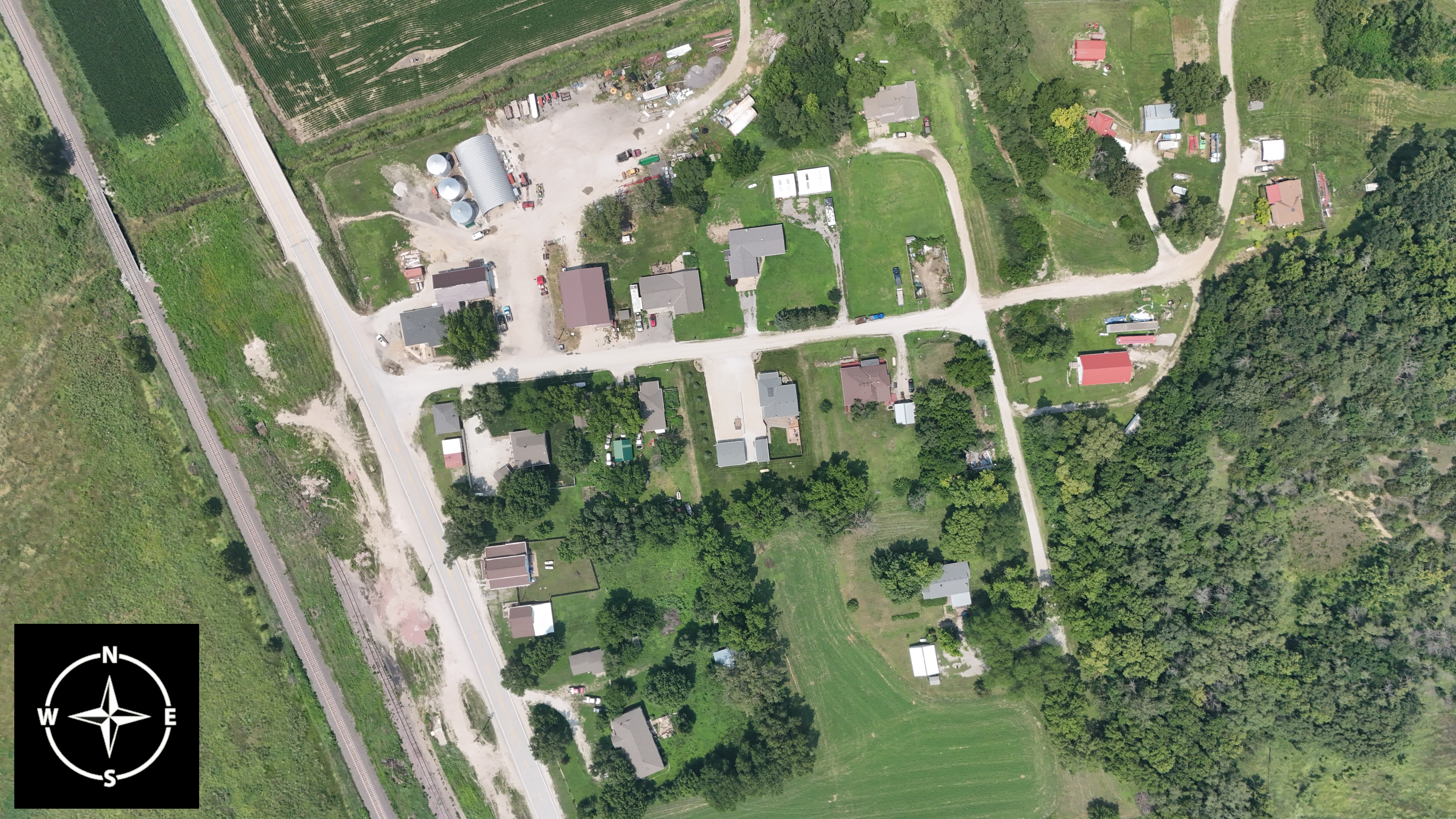
An aerial view of Loveland, on July 13, 2025

== Demographics ==
Historical population
Census	Pop.	Note	%±
2010	35		—
2020	36		2.9%
U.S. Decennial Census

=== 2020 census ===
As of the census of 2020, there were 36 people, 14 households, and 7 families residing in the community. The population density was 915.4 inhabitants per square mile (353.5/km^{2}). There were 17 housing units at an average density of 432.3 per square mile (166.9/km^{2}). The racial makeup of the community was 88.9% White, 2.8% Black or African American, 0.0% Native American, 0.0% Asian, 0.0% Pacific Islander, 0.0% from other races and 8.3% from two or more races. Hispanic or Latino persons of any race comprised 5.6% of the population.

Of the 14 households, 0.0% of which had children under the age of 18 living with them, 21.4% were married couples living together, 0.0% were cohabitating couples, 42.9% had a female householder with no spouse or partner present and 35.7% had a male householder with no spouse or partner present. 50.0% of all households were non-families. 42.9% of all households were made up of individuals, 21.4% had someone living alone who was 65 years old or older.

The median age in the community was 43.7 years. 22.2% of the residents were under the age of 20; 2.8% were between the ages of 20 and 24; 30.6% were from 25 and 44; 27.8% were from 45 and 64; and 16.7% were 65 years of age or older. The gender makeup of the community was 58.3% male and 41.7% female.
