= Oakland, Iowa =

- City
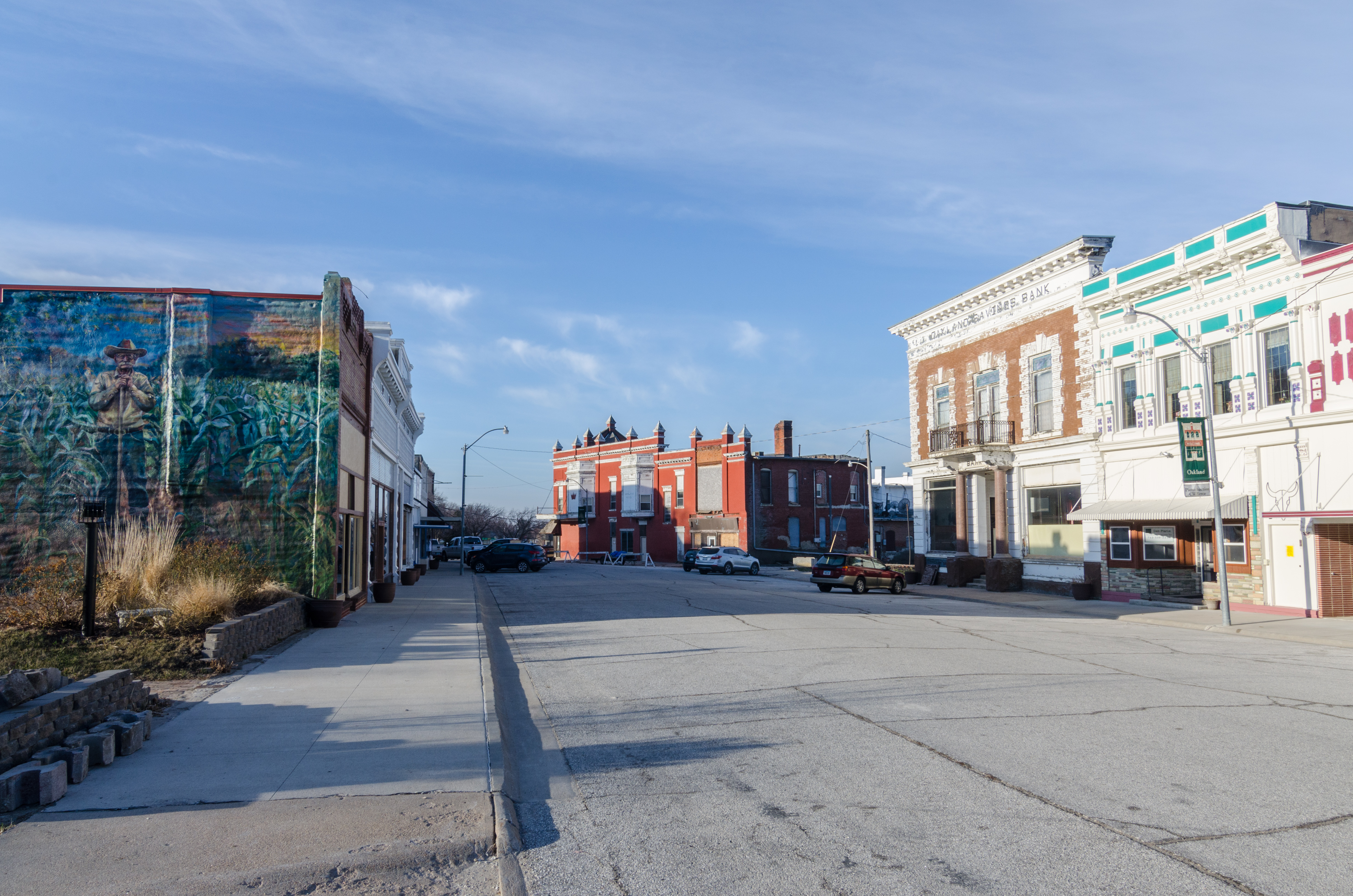
- Downtown Oakland, Iowa

- Location of Oakland, Iowa

- Location within Iowa Location within the United States
- Coordinates: 41°18′41″N 95°23′42″W
- Country: USA
- State: Iowa
- County: Pottawattamie
- Township: Belknap

Area
  - Total: 1.89 sq mi (4.89 km^{2})
  - Land: 1.79 sq mi (4.64 km^{2})
  - Water: 0.097 sq mi (0.25 km^{2})
- Elevation: 1,116 ft (340 m)

Population (2020)
  - Total: 1,524
  - Density: 850.7/sq mi (328.45/km^{2})
- Time zone: UTC-6 (Central (CST))
  - Summer (DST): UTC-5 (CDT)
- ZIP code: 51560
- Area code: 712
- FIPS code: 19-58080
- GNIS feature ID: 2395289
- Website: City of Oakland

Oakland is a city located along the West Nishnabotna River in Pottawattamie County, Iowa, United States. Its population was 1,524 at the time of the 2020 census. Formerly named Big Grove, Oakland is home to Nishna Heritage Museum and a number of historical buildings.

== History ==
Oakland began in 1880 with the construction of the Chicago, Rock Island and Pacific Railroad through the territory.

== Geography ==
According to the United States Census Bureau, the city has a total area of 1.58 square miles (4.09 km^{2}), of which 0.16 sq mi (0.41 km^{2}) is covered by water.

=== Climate ===
Climate data for Oakland, Iowa (1991–2020, extremes 1919–present)
Month	Jan	Feb	Mar	Apr	May	Jun	Jul	Aug	Sep	Oct	Nov	Dec	Year
Record high °F (°C)	69 (21)	75 (24)	89 (32)	93 (34)	104 (40)	108 (42)	116 (47)	109 (43)	103 (39)	93 (34)	83 (28)	71 (22)	116 (47)
Mean maximum °F (°C)	52.4 (11.3)	57.8 (14.3)	74.6 (23.7)	84.6 (29.2)	89.6 (32.0)	93.1 (33.9)	94.5 (34.7)	93.1 (33.9)	90.5 (32.5)	83.9 (28.8)	69.7 (20.9)	56.6 (13.7)	96.0 (35.6)
Mean daily maximum °F (°C)	30.1 (−1.1)	35.0 (1.7)	48.8 (9.3)	61.5 (16.4)	71.9 (22.2)	81.5 (27.5)	84.7 (29.3)	83.0 (28.3)	76.7 (24.8)	64.0 (17.8)	48.0 (8.9)	34.8 (1.6)	60.0 (15.6)
Daily mean °F (°C)	20.9 (−6.2)	25.3 (−3.7)	37.7 (3.2)	49.3 (9.6)	60.9 (16.1)	71.0 (21.7)	74.4 (23.6)	72.4 (22.4)	64.8 (18.2)	52.3 (11.3)	37.8 (3.2)	26.1 (−3.3)	49.4 (9.7)
Mean daily minimum °F (°C)	11.8 (−11.2)	15.6 (−9.1)	26.7 (−2.9)	37.2 (2.9)	49.9 (9.9)	60.5 (15.8)	64.0 (17.8)	61.9 (16.6)	52.8 (11.6)	40.5 (4.7)	27.7 (−2.4)	17.4 (−8.1)	38.8 (3.8)
Mean minimum °F (°C)	−10.7 (−23.7)	−4.5 (−20.3)	7.0 (−13.9)	22.0 (−5.6)	36.3 (2.4)	49.0 (9.4)	53.8 (12.1)	51.9 (11.1)	38.7 (3.7)	24.8 (−4.0)	11.0 (−11.7)	−2.8 (−19.3)	−12.9 (−24.9)
Record low °F (°C)	−31 (−35)	−29 (−34)	−25 (−32)	0 (−18)	21 (−6)	33 (1)	36 (2)	35 (2)	22 (−6)	−2 (−19)	−17 (−27)	−30 (−34)	−31 (−35)
Average precipitation inches (mm)	0.85 (22)	1.07 (27)	1.99 (51)	3.90 (99)	5.42 (138)	5.28 (134)	3.58 (91)	4.87 (124)	3.62 (92)	2.97 (75)	1.57 (40)	1.31 (33)	36.43 (925)
Average snowfall inches (cm)	6.7 (17)	8.0 (20)	3.4 (8.6)	1.1 (2.8)	0.1 (0.25)	0.0 (0.0)	0.0 (0.0)	0.0 (0.0)	0.0 (0.0)	1.0 (2.5)	1.2 (3.0)	6.5 (17)	28.0 (71)
Average precipitation days (≥ 0.01 in)	5.6	6.2	7.3	10.1	12.9	10.8	8.8	7.9	7.9	8.2	5.3	5.9	96.9
Average snowy days (≥ 0.1 in)	4.4	4.5	2.0	0.7	0.0	0.0	0.0	0.0	0.0	0.4	1.2	4.0	17.2
Source: NOAA

== Demographics ==
Historical populations
Year	Pop.	±%
1890	686	—
1900	913	+33.1%
1910	1,105	+21.0%
1920	1,188	+7.5%
1930	1,181	−0.6%
1940	1,317	+11.5%
1950	1,296	−1.6%
1960	1,340	+3.4%
1970	1,603	+19.6%
1980	1,552	−3.2%
1990	1,496	−3.6%
2000	1,487	−0.6%
2010	1,527	+2.7%
2020	1,524	−0.2%
Source:"U.S. Census website". United States Census Bureau. and Iowa Data Center; Source: U.S. Decennial Census

=== 2020 census ===
As of the 2020 census, Oakland had a population of 1,524.

The population density was 850.7 inhabitants per sq mi (328.4/km^{2}). The 669 housing units had an average density of 373.4 per sq mi (144.2/km^{2}), of which 7.8% were vacant. The homeowner vacancy rate was 1.8% and the rental vacancy rate was 2.5%.

There were 617 households and 377 families in Oakland. Of households, 30.5% had children under the age of 18 living in them, 47.3% were married-couple households, 6.5% were cohabitating couples, 24.1% had a female householder with no spouse or partner present, and 22.0% had a male householder with no spouse or partner present. About 38.9% of all households were non-families, 33.4% were made up of individuals, and 14.9% had someone living alone who was 65 years of age or older.

The median age was 41.9 years. 24.6% of residents were under the age of 18. The age distribution was 26.6% under 20; 4.3% from 20 to 24; 23.2% from 25 to 44; 24.4% from 45 to 64; and 21.5% were 65 or older. The gender makeup of the city was 49.3% male and 50.7% female. For every 100 females there were 97.4 males, and for every 100 females age 18 and over there were 99.8 males age 18 and over.

0.0% of residents lived in urban areas, while 100.0% lived in rural areas.

Racial composition as of the 2020 census
Race	Number	Percent
White	1,344	88.2%
Black or African American	8	0.5%
American Indian and Alaska Native	6	0.4%
Asian	11	0.7%
Native Hawaiian and Other Pacific Islander	1	0.1%
Some other race	65	4.3%
Two or more races	89	5.8%
Hispanic or Latino (of any race)	153	10.0%

=== 2010 census ===
As of the 2010 census, 1,527 people, 604 households, and 407 families were living in the city. The population density was 1,075.4 inhabitants per square mile (415.2/km^{2}). The 657 housing units had an average density of 462.7 per square mile (178.6/km^{2}). The racial makeup of the city was 96.7% White, 0.5% African American, 0.2% Native American, 1.5% from other races, and 1.2% from two or more races. Hispanics or Latinos of any race were 4.3% of the population.

Of the 604 households, 32.3% had children under 18 living with them, 53.3% were married couples living together, 10.3% had a female householder with no husband present, 3.8% had a male householder with no wife present, and 32.6% were not families. About 28.6% of all households were made up of individuals, and 13.4% had someone living alone who was 65 or older. The average household size was 2.44 and the average family size was 3.00.

The median age in the city was 39.8 years. The age distribution was 24.8% under 18, 6.5% from 18 to 24, 24.2% from 25 to 44, 26.5% from 45 to 64, and 18.2% were 65 or older. The gender makeup of the city was 47.1% male and 52.9% female.

=== 2000 census ===
As of the 2000 census, 1,487 people, 600 households, and 397 families lived in the city. The population density was 986.7 inhabitants per square mile (381.0/km^{2}). The 635 housing units had an average density of 421.3 per square mile (162.7/km^{2}). The racial makeup of the city was 98.45% White, 0.54% African American, 0.34% Native American, 0.13% Asian, and 0.54% from two or more races. Hispanics or Latinos of any race were 0.27% of the population.

Of the 600 households, 29.8% had children under 18 living with them, 55.8% were married couples living together, 7.8% had a female householder with no husband present, and 33.8% were not families. 30.5% of all households were made up of individuals, and 16.2% had someone living alone who was 65 or older. The average household size was 2.37 and the average family size was 2.91. The age distribution was 24.3% under 18, 7.6% from 18 to 24, 24.9% from 25 to 44, 21.5% from 45 to 64, and 21.7% who were 65 or older. The median age was 40 years. For every 100 females, there were 91.4 males. For every 100 females 18 and over, there were 86.0 males.

The median household income was $37,961 and the median family income was $48,092. Males had a median income of $31,569 and females $22,902. The per capita income was $19,205. About 4.8% of families and 6.1% of the population were below the poverty line, including 5.8% of those under 18 and 6.4% of those 65 or over.

== Education ==
Oakland is within the Riverside Community School District. The district formed on July 1, 1993 with the merger of the Carson-Macedonia and Oakland districts.

== Notable people ==
- Pat Bohen, professional baseball player
- Frank Tenney Johnson, artist/illustrator
