= Macedonia, Iowa =

- City
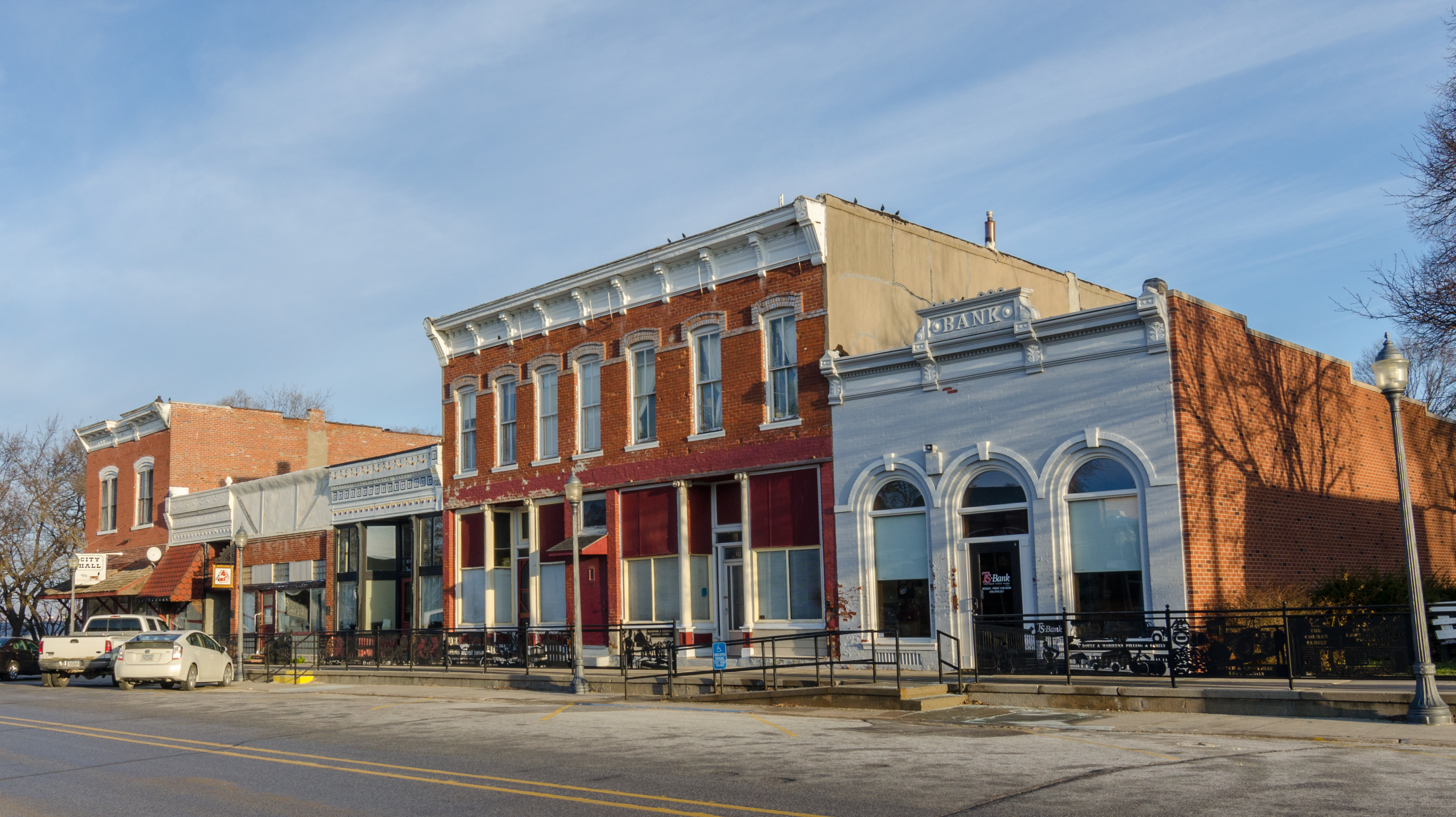
- Downtown Macedonia, Iowa

- Location within Iowa Location within the United States
- Coordinates: 41°11′32″N 95°25′36″W
- Country: USA
- State: Iowa
- County: Pottawattamie
- Township: Macedonia

Area
  - Total: 0.24 sq mi (0.61 km^{2})
  - Land: 0.24 sq mi (0.61 km^{2})
  - Water: 0 sq mi (0.00 km^{2})
- Elevation: 1,129 ft (344 m)

Population (2020)
  - Total: 267
  - Density: 1,131.4/sq mi (436.83/km^{2})
- Time zone: UTC-6 (Central (CST))
  - Summer (DST): UTC-5 (CDT)
- ZIP code: 51549
- Area code: 712
- FIPS code: 19-47955
- GNIS feature ID: 2395797
- Website: City of Macedonia

Macedonia is a city in Pottawattamie County, Iowa, United States. The population was 267 at the time of the 2020 census.

== History ==
The city was named after the region of Macedonia, in Ancient Greece. It is located along the route of the historical Pioneer Trail.

== Geography ==
According to the United States Census Bureau, the city has a total area of 0.33 square miles (0.85 km^{2}), all land.

== Demographics ==
Historical populations
Year	Pop.	±%
1900	295	—
1910	357	+21.0%
1920	352	−1.4%
1930	314	−10.8%
1940	329	+4.8%
1950	298	−9.4%
1960	290	−2.7%
1970	330	+13.8%
1980	279	−15.5%
1990	262	−6.1%
2000	325	+24.0%
2010	246	−24.3%
2020	267	+8.5%
Source:"U.S. Census website". United States Census Bureau. and Iowa Data Center; Source: U.S. Decennial Census

=== 2020 census ===
As of the census of 2020, there were 267 people, 131 households, and 79 families residing in the city. The population density was 1,131.4 inhabitants per square mile (436.8/km^{2}). There were 136 housing units at an average density of 576.3 per square mile (222.5/km^{2}). The racial makeup of the city was 93.3% White, 0.4% Black or African American, 0.7% Native American, 0.7% Asian, 0.0% Pacific Islander, 1.5% from other races and 3.4% from two or more races. Hispanic or Latino persons of any race comprised 3.4% of the population.

Of the 131 households, 32.1% of which had children under the age of 18 living with them, 40.5% were married couples living together, 8.4% were cohabitating couples, 32.1% had a female householder with no spouse or partner present and 19.1% had a male householder with no spouse or partner present. 39.7% of all households were non-families. 35.9% of all households were made up of individuals, 16.8% had someone living alone who was 65 years old or older.

The median age in the city was 39.6 years. 24.7% of the residents were under the age of 20; 5.6% were between the ages of 20 and 24; 23.2% were from 25 and 44; 27.7% were from 45 and 64; and 18.7% were 65 years of age or older. The gender makeup of the city was 43.8% male and 56.2% female.

=== 2010 census ===
As of the census of 2010, there were 246 people, 111 households, and 71 families living in the city. The population density was 745.5 inhabitants per square mile (287.8/km^{2}). There were 137 housing units at an average density of 415.2 per square mile (160.3/km^{2}). The racial makeup of the city was 97.6% White, 0.8% Asian, and 1.6% from two or more races. Hispanic or Latino of any race were 0.4% of the population.

There were 111 households, of which 29.7% had children under the age of 18 living with them, 49.5% were married couples living together, 9.0% had a female householder with no husband present, 5.4% had a male householder with no wife present, and 36.0% were non-families. 28.8% of all households were made up of individuals, and 12.6% had someone living alone who was 65 years of age or older. The average household size was 2.22 and the average family size was 2.68.

The median age in the city was 44 years. 22.4% of residents were under the age of 18; 6.9% were between the ages of 18 and 24; 22% were from 25 to 44; 32.9% were from 45 to 64; and 15.9% were 65 years of age or older. The gender makeup of the city was 50.8% male and 49.2% female.

=== 2000 census ===
As of the census of 2000, there were 325 people, 130 households, and 86 families living in the city. The population density was 951.9 inhabitants per square mile (367.5/km^{2}). There were 137 housing units at an average density of 401.3 per square mile (154.9/km^{2}). The racial makeup of the city was 99.08% White, and 0.92% from two or more races. Hispanic or Latino of any race were 0.62% of the population.

There were 130 households, out of which 33.1% had children under the age of 18 living with them, 53.1% were married couples living together, 10.0% had a female householder with no husband present, and 33.8% were non-families. 31.5% of all households were made up of individuals, and 13.1% had someone living alone who was 65 years of age or older. The average household size was 2.50 and the average family size was 3.10.

27.7% are under the age of 18, 9.5% from 18 to 24, 28.9% from 25 to 44, 17.5% from 45 to 64, and 16.3% who were 65 years of age or older. The median age was 36 years. For every 100 females, there were 99.4 males. For every 100 females age 18 and over, there were 86.5 males.

The median income for a household in the city was $32,813, and the median income for a family was $39,792. Males had a median income of $31,528 versus $22,500 for females. The per capita income for the city was $14,189. About 14.7% of families and 14.5% of the population were below the poverty line, including 12.2% of those under age 18 and 16.3% of those age 65 or over.

== Education ==
Macedonia is within the Riverside Community School District. The district formed on July 1, 1993, with the merger of the Carson-Macedonia and Oakland districts.
