= Hardin Township, Pottawattamie County, Iowa =

Township in Pottawattamie County, Iowa, U.S.

Coordinates: 41.28°N 95.67°W

Hardin Township is a township in Pottawattamie County, Iowa, United States.

== History ==
Hardin Township was organized in 1869. It is named for Richard "Old Dick" Hardin, a pioneer settler.
