= Hazel Dell Township, Pottawattamie County, Iowa =

Township in Pottawattamie County, Iowa, U.S.

Hazel Dell Township
- Township
- Interactive map of Hazel Dell Township
- Coordinates: 41.37°N 95.78°W
- Country: United States
- State: Iowa
- County: Pottawattamie
- Organized: 1873

Hazel Dell Township is a township in Pottawattamie County, Iowa, United States.

== History ==
Hazel Dell Township was organized in 1873.
