= Boomer Township, Pottawattamie County, Iowa =

Township in Pottawattamie County, Iowa, U.S.

Coordinates: 41.4629°N 95.7839°W

Boomer Township is a township in Pottawattamie County, Iowa, United States.

The population of Boomer Township was 688 at the 2020 census.

== History ==
Boomer Township was established in 1858. It was named for a man surnamed Bloomer, but the judge omitted the L.
