= Macedonia Township, Pottawattamie County, Iowa =

Macedonia Township
- Township
- Location within Iowa Location within the United States
- Coordinates: 41.189°N 95.442°W
- Country: United States
- State: Iowa
- County: Pottawattamie
- Organized: 1857

Macedonia Township is a township in Pottawattamie County, Iowa, United States.

== History ==
Macedonia Township was organized in 1857.
