= Underwood, Iowa =

- City
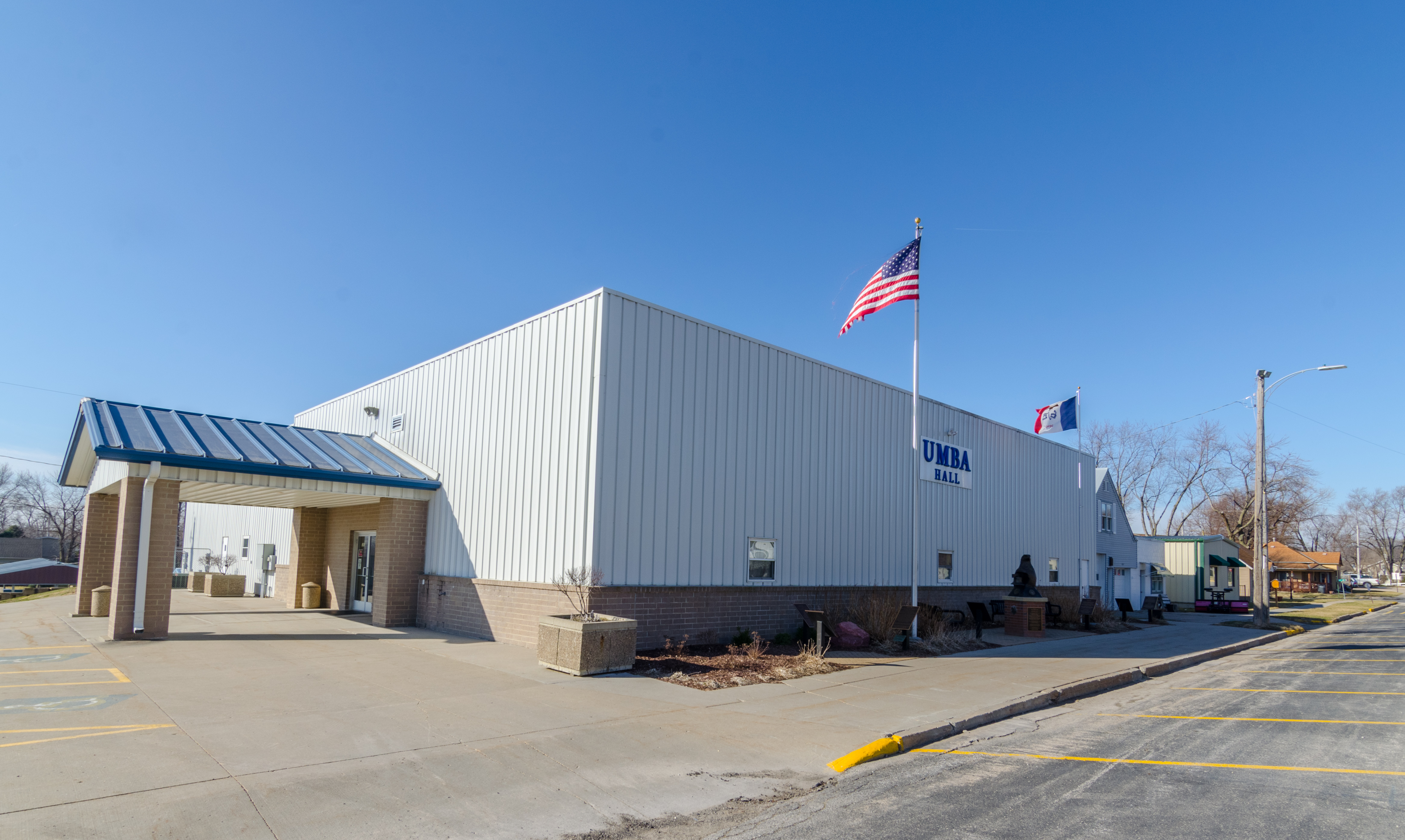
- Underwood, Iowa Memorial Hall

- Location of Underwood, Iowa

- Location within Iowa Location within the United States
- Coordinates: 41°22′30″N 95°41′02″W
- Country: USA
- State: Iowa
- County: Pottawattamie
- Township: Norwalk

Area
  - Total: 1.12 sq mi (2.89 km^{2})
  - Land: 1.09 sq mi (2.82 km^{2})
  - Water: 0.027 sq mi (0.07 km^{2})
- Elevation: 1,060 ft (320 m)

Population (2020)
  - Total: 954
  - Density: 875.9/sq mi (338.19/km^{2})
- Time zone: UTC-6 (Central (CST))
  - Summer (DST): UTC-5 (CDT)
- ZIP code: 51576
- Area code: 712
- FIPS code: 19-79500
- GNIS feature ID: 2397083
- Website: City of Underwood

Underwood is a city in Pottawattamie County, Iowa, United States. The population was 954 at the time of the 2020 census.

== History ==
Underwood is located in Norwalk Township, so the early history of the township is also of the town. The historical information provided here was taken from a book on Pottawattamie County's past. The principal early settlers of the area arrived during the period from 1845 to 1850. In 1847, a flour mill and a saw mill were built on Mosquito Creek, southwest of the present site of Underwood. In 1850, the flour mill was destroyed by a flood. The first school was built in 1863, and soon more homes were built near the school and saw mill. It became known as Downsville. A post office was established there.

With the coming of the Chicago, Rock Island and Pacific Railroad in 1869, the town of Underwood was established three miles northeast of Downsville, which was later abandoned and has entirely disappeared (with the exception of a cemetery). In 1882, the other railroad that crossed through Norwalk Township, Chicago, Milwaukee and St. Paul, built a station house, erected a water tank and laid a switch. These improvements were on portions of the farms owned by two men and their farms were to be surveyed and divided into town lots. The name Underwood comes from the name of the first engineer to run a train over the Milwaukee tracks. Two farmers cut the corn stalks off to make a road to the Milwaukee tracks so the depot could be built. This path later became "Main Street".

In 1902, the town was incorporated, a town marshal appointed, sidewalks constructed and a jail built at the cost of $140. The first addition to the town was presented to the town council in 1903. The old school house was moved onto town property and made into a town hall. In 1905, five street lamps were purchased, sidewalks and streets were extended. From 1907 to 1910 the telephone came to town, a water works system was installed and cement sidewalks constructed. By 1917 a fire department was organized. In 1926 a new consolidated school was built at the cost of approximately $75,000. There were 62 students in high school and 116 in the grades with seven teachers in charge.

In 1965, sewer mains were installed. The new Western Electric plant was finished in 1974 and they helped bring the town's sewer plant up to date.

In 2012, Jack Links opened a distribution center in Underwood, providing a $15,000 donation to the community.

== Geography ==
According to the United States Census Bureau, the town has a total area of 0.46 square miles (1.19 km^{2}), all land. Underwood, Iowa is located in the Loess Hills, a prairie made of windblown soil deposited following the last Ice Age.

== Demographics ==
Historical populations
| Year | Pop. | ±% |
|---|---|---|
| 1910 | 271 | — |
| 1920 | 260 | −4.1% |
| 1930 | 261 | +0.4% |
| 1940 | 251 | −3.8% |
| 1950 | 278 | +10.8% |
| 1960 | 337 | +21.2% |
| 1970 | 424 | +25.8% |
| 1980 | 448 | +5.7% |
| 1990 | 515 | +15.0% |
| 2000 | 688 | +33.6% |
| 2010 | 917 | +33.3% |
| 2020 | 954 | +4.0% |
Source:"U.S. Census website". United States Census Bureau. and Iowa Data Center; Source: U.S. Decennial Census

=== 2020 census ===
As of the census of 2020, there were 954 people, 344 households, and 257 families residing in the city. The population density was 875.9 inhabitants per square mile (338.2/km^{2}). There were 372 housing units at an average density of 341.5 per square mile (131.9/km^{2}). The racial makeup of the city was 95.4% White, 0.0% Black or African American, 0.2% Native American, 1.0% Asian, 0.0% Pacific Islander, 0.5% from other races and 2.8% from two or more races. Hispanic or Latino persons of any race comprised 3.1% of the population.

Of the 344 households, 46.2% of which had children under the age of 18 living with them, 57.0% were married couples living together, 3.8% were cohabitating couples, 23.5% had a female householder with no spouse or partner present and 15.7% had a male householder with no spouse or partner present. 25.3% of all households were non-families. 22.1% of all households were made up of individuals, 8.7% had someone living alone who was 65 years old or older.

The median age in the city was 35.2 years. 34.6% of the residents were under the age of 20; 3.9% were between the ages of 20 and 24; 24.5% were from 25 and 44; 26.0% were from 45 and 64; and 11.0% were 65 years of age or older. The gender makeup of the city was 50.0% male and 50.0% female.

=== 2010 census ===
As of the census of 2010, there were 917 people, 330 households, and 260 families living in the town. The population density was 1,993.5 inhabitants per square mile (769.7/km^{2}). There were 336 housing units at an average density of 730.4 per square mile (282.0/km^{2}). The racial makeup of the town was 97.8% White, 0.9% African American, 0.1% Native American, 0.2% Asian, 0.1% from other races, and 0.9% from two or more races. Hispanic or Latino of any race were 1.3% of the population.

There were 330 households, of which 46.1% had children under the age of 18 living with them, 59.1% were married couples living together, 14.2% had a female householder with no husband present, 5.5% had a male householder with no wife present, and 21.2% were non-families. 17.6% of all households were made up of individuals, and 7.3% had someone living alone who was 65 years of age or older. The average household size was 2.78 and the average family size was 3.16.

The median age in the town was 35.2 years. 33.2% of residents were under the age of 18; 6.9% were between the ages of 18 and 24; 25.3% were from 25 to 44; 25% were from 45 to 64; and 9.7% were 65 years of age or older. The gender makeup of the town was 48.9% male and 51.1% female.

=== 2000 census ===
As of the census of 2000, there were 688 people, 258 households, and 178 families living in the town. The population density was 1,886.8 inhabitants per square mile (728.5/km^{2}). There were 266 housing units at an average density of 729.5 per square mile (281.7/km^{2}). The racial makeup of the town was 99.27% White, 0.15% Asian, 0.58% from other races. Hispanic or Latino of any race were 1.16% of the population.

There were 258 households, out of which 41.9% had children under the age of 18 living with them, 55.8% were married couples living together, 12.0% had a female householder with no husband present, and 31.0% were non-families. 25.2% of all households were made up of individuals, and 12.4% had someone living alone who was 65 years of age or older. The average household size was 2.67 and the average family size was 3.27.

In the town, the population was spread out, with 31.4% under the age of 18, 10.3% from 18 to 24, 28.6% from 25 to 44, 19.9% from 45 to 64, and 9.7% who were 65 years of age or older. The median age was 32 years. For every 100 females, there were 85.4 males. For every 100 females age 18 and over, there were 74.8 males.

The median income for a household in the town was $42,143, and the median income for a family was $56,750. Males had a median income of $35,469 versus $23,594 for females. The per capita income for the town was $17,953. About 4.6% of families and 5.4% of the population were below the poverty line, including 3.0% of those under age 18 and 12.0% of those age 65 or over.

== Education ==
The Underwood Community School District serves the town of Underwood.
