= Norwalk Township, Pottawattamie County, Iowa =

Norwalk Township
- Township
- Location within Iowa Location within the United States
- Coordinates: 41.376°N 95.669°W
- Country: United States
- State: Iowa
- County: Pottawattamie
- Organized: 1873

Norwalk Township is a township in Pottawattamie County, Iowa, United States.

== History ==
Norwalk Township was organized in 1873. It was named by a resident who hailed from Norwalk, Connecticut.
