= Minden (disambiguation) =

Minden is a city in the German state of North Rhine-Westphalia.

Minden may also refer to:

== Places ==
=== Australia ===
- Minden, Queensland

=== Canada ===
- Minden, Ontario

=== Germany ===
- Minden, Rhineland-Palatinate

=== New Zealand ===
- Minden, New Zealand

=== United States ===
- Minden, Alabama
- Minden, Iowa
- Minden, Louisiana
- Minden, Minnesota, a ghost town in Benton County, Minnesota
- Minden, Mississippi
- Minden, Lawrence County, Missouri
- Minden, Warren County, Missouri, a ghost town in Warren County, Missouri
- Minden, Montana, an unincorporated community in Meagher County, Montana
- Minden, Nebraska
- Minden, Nevada
- Minden, New York
- Minden, South Carolina, an unincorporated community in Chesterfield County, South Carolina
- Minden, Texas
- Minden, West Virginia
- Mindenmines, Missouri
- Minden City, Michigan
- Minden Township, Pottawattamie County, Iowa
- Minden Township, Michigan
- Minden Township, Benton County, Minnesota
- New Minden, Illinois

=== Hong Kong ===
- Minden Row

== People ==
- Judah Löb Minden (18th-century), German lexicographer
- Löb ben Moses Minden (died 1751), ḥazzan and poet
- Lion Van Minden (1880–1944), Dutch Olympic fencer

== Other uses ==
- Minden (ship) former lifeboat which has operated as a rescue ship in the Mediterranean
- SS Minden, a German cargo ship, sank in 1939
- The М-1085 Minden, an ex-German minesweeper, now in service with the Georgian Navy
- HMS Minden, a Royal Navy ship, 1810
- Battle of Minden, 1759
- Minden Day (August 1), the commemoration of the Battle of Minden, celebrated by the regiments of the British Army who fought in it

== See also ==
- Mindon (disambiguation)
- Munden (disambiguation)
