= 2024 Minden–Harlan tornado =

2024 tornado in Iowa, U.S.

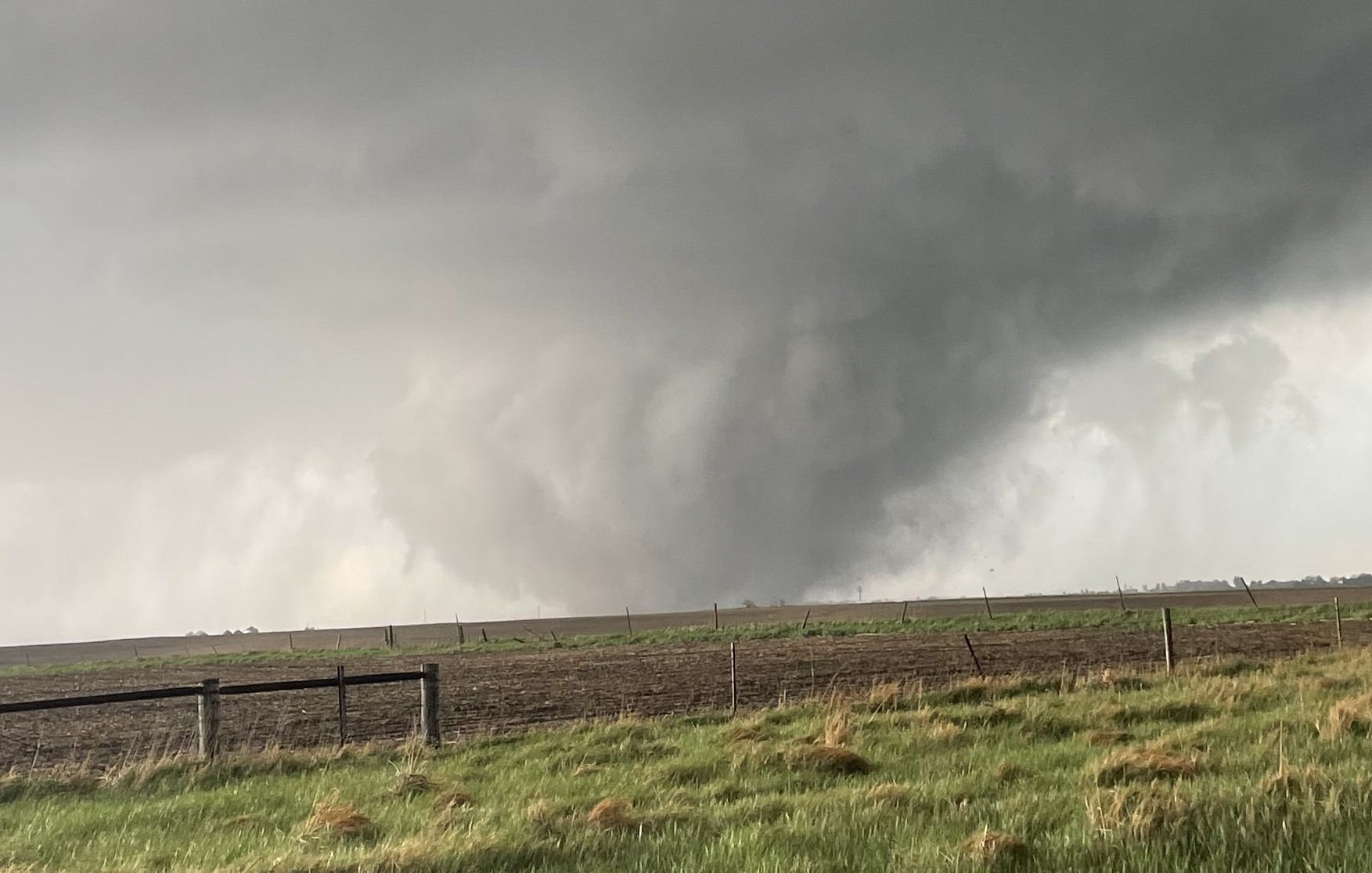
- Clockwise from top: The tornado near Minden, Iowa at peak intensity and width; radar evolution of the Minden tornado from touchdown to dissipation.

Meteorological history
- Formed: April 26, 2024, 5:25 p.m. CDT (UTC−05:00)
- Dissipated: April 26, 2024, 6:29 p.m. CDT (UTC−05:00)
- Duration: 1 hour and 4 minutes

EF3 tornado
- on the Enhanced Fujita scale
- Path length: 40.91 miles (65.84 km)
- Highest winds: Official intensity: 160 mph (260 km/h); Radar-estimated: 224 mph (360 km/h) (as measured by Doppler on Wheels (DOW) radar)

Overall effects
- Fatalities: 1
- Injuries: 3
- Damage: $112 million (2024 USD)
- Areas affected: Pottawattamie County, Iowa (specifically Minden), Shelby County, Iowa (specifically rural areas around Shelby, Tennant, Harlan, and the town of Defiance, Iowa
- Part of the Tornado outbreak of April 25–28, 2024 and Tornadoes of 2024

On the early evening of April 26, 2024, a large and intense multiple-vortex tornado caused major damage to the small town of Minden and impacted several farmsteads in rural Shelby County, Iowa. The tornado resulted in one fatality and three injuries and tracked 40.91 miles (65.84 km), reaching a peak width of 1,900 yards (1,700 m). The tornado was the longest tracked tornado of a larger outbreak that occurred in late April and tied for the largest tornado of the outbreak, tying with the Elkhorn–Blair, Nebraska EF4 tornado. The tornado was the second costliest of the outbreak, inflicting $112 million in damage.

The tornado touched down east of McClelland, staying at EF0 strength for the first few miles before abruptly intensifying to mid-range EF2 intensity south of Minden, while a tornado emergency for the community and surrounding area before the tornado struck the town at high-end EF3 strength. Several residential homes received major to complete destruction from the tornado. Many businesses in town were severely damaged or flattened with estimated wind speeds of 160 mph (260 km/h). Northeast of town, the tornado inflicted more severe damage to farmsteads and a church was destroyed. The tornado reached its peak width south of I-80, tracking through Harrison and Shelby County while missing Shelby and Tennant, and passing west of Harlan, where it was observed by Doppler on Wheels. The tornado became then rain-wrapped as it missed Defiance before dissipating north of the town after being on the ground for 1 hour and 4 minutes.

== Meteorological synopsis ==
A cluster of thunderstorms developed in the Permian Basin of Texas in the early overnight hours into April 26, becoming and maintaining severe characteristics as they tracked northeast into the Red River Valley. This cluster eventually organized into a quasi-linear convective system over southern Oklahoma, potentially producing at least one tornado. The Storm Prediction Center (SPC) received three reports of tornadoes from Oklahoma during the early morning hours of April 26; seven weak tornadoes were later confirmed in the state.

More significant severe weather was expected to occur later on in the day. The event was first forecasted to occur on April 20, when a 15% risk area was issued across much of the south-central United States by the Storm Prediction Center for April 26. By April 23, the 15% area had been expanded tremendously, covering areas from the eastern Great Plains into the mid-Mississippi Valley. On April 24, the 15% risk area transitioned into slight risk area that covered the same area with all severe weather hazards expected. With an enhanced risk of severe weather in place, the Storm Prediction issued a tornado watch for eastern Oklahoma on the morning of April 26. Several hours later, on the afternoon of April 26, another tornado watch was implemented for northeastern Nebraska, which included the possibility for "a couple of intense tornadoes." At 3:41 p.m. CDT, a tornado emergency was issued for West Elkhorn as a large and destructive tornado moved through the area. Some homes were completely leveled and many more structures suffered significant damage.

=== Minden Supercell ===
Supercells moving through eastern Nebraska and western Iowa on April 26, with the supercell north of Nebraska City being the Minden supercell.

The supercell that later produced the Minden tornado first crossed into Iowa, then the supercell produced its first tornado north of Pacific Junction. This tornado traveled north towards I-29, inflicting minor damage to trees and power poles along 195th Street. The tornado crossed the interstate before striking the community of Pacific City at high-end EF0 intensity. Trees along I-29 were snapped and a home northwest of Pacific City lost large portions of its roof at mid-range EF1 strength. The tornado then trek through forested areas, snapping several hardwood trees with wind speeds up to 100 mph (160 km/h). Eventually the tornado dissipated over the Pony Creek Park, the tornado was on the ground for five minutes and traveled 2.7 mi (4.3 km), with a peak width of 80 yd (73 m).

The supercell recycled and produced another tornado east of the small community of Dumfries at 5:08 p.m. CST. The tornado was initially weak, inflicting minor damage to hardwood trees along Aspen Road. The tornado slightly strengthened to low-end EF1 intensity, blowing down power poles along County Road G66. Continuing its northeast trajectory, the tornado intensified to near high-end EF1 east of County Road L45, snapping multiple hardwood trees at 107 mph (172 km/h). The tornado weakened slightly along Burgan Avenue, snapping more trees at 95 mph (153 km/h). The tornado crossed Chestnut Road, causing major roof damage to a double-wide mobile home at low-end EF1 intensity.

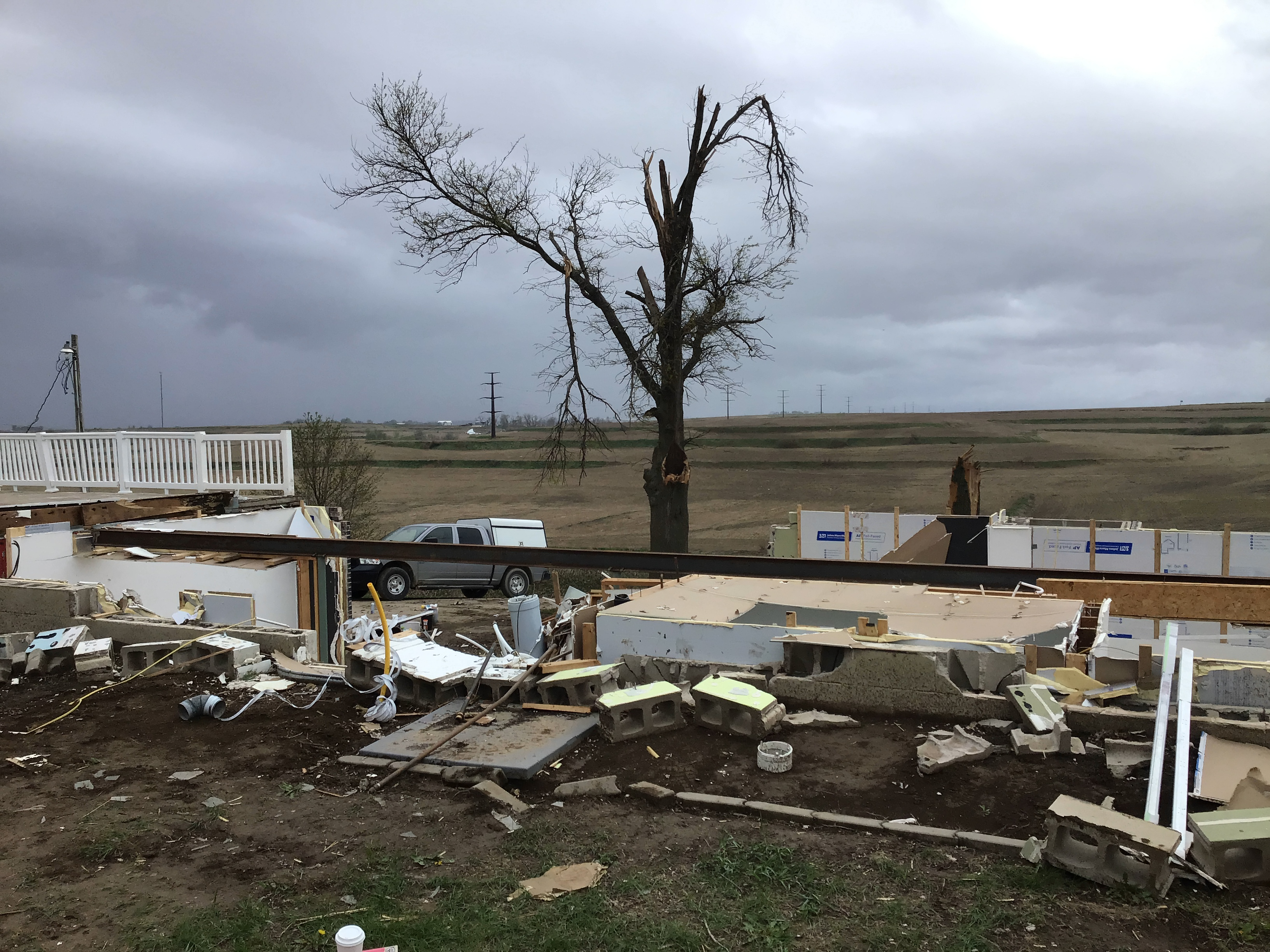
A poorly-built home swept away by an EF3 tornado near Treynor

The tornado abruptly intensified to high-end EF2 strength west of Treynor. Alongside Iowa 92, a well-built home suffered substantial loss to their exterior walls at 135 mph (217 km/h). An 85-year-old elderly woman survived the tornado after not making it to shelter in time. Another home nearby sustained significant roof damage by the tornado. Several trees were snapped and a large shed was demolished, and a large steel trailer was thrown a quarter mile away. The tornado weakened substantially to high-end EF0 intensity crossing into Greenview Road, bending a free-standing pole and causing minor damage to a hardwood tree. The tornado then crossed Cottonwood Road, intensifying slightly to mid-range EF1 intensity. A farmhouse sustained minor damage and a roof of a small barn was ripped off. Along Dogwood Road, the tornado rapidly intensified to low-end EF3 strength, with estimated wind speeds of 145 mph (233 km/h). A poorly constructed farmhouse was obliterated and swept away. Several trees nearby were snapped and an outbuilding nearby was leveled.

The tornado weakened significantly to high-end EF1 intensity along Elmtree Road. More trees were snapped and a nearby home sustained moderate roof damage. The tornado passed near the community of Quick, weakening further as wooden power poles were snapped at wind speeds of 100 mph (160 km/h). Southwest of McClelland, the tornado briefly strengthened to low-end EF2 intensity, causing moderate roof damage and snapping more trees. Around the same time, the supercell began recycling again, causing the former tornado to substantially weaken before dissipating over an open field near McClelland at 5:28 p.m. CST. The tornado traveled 13.31 mi (21.42 km) with a peak width of 900 yd (820 m). The tornado was on the ground for 20 minutes.

== Tornado summary ==
=== Formation and track through Pottawattamie County ===
As the McClelland tornado started dissipating, the supercell recycled and produced the Minden tornado at 5:25 p.m. CST. For the first few miles, the tornado mainly stayed in rural areas of Pottawattamie County. The tornado crossed Morton Avenue east of Underwood at EF0 intensity. An outbuilding was unroofed and trees sustained minor damage. The tornado began to intensify and widen on approach to Minden. Hardwood and softwood trees along Sumac Road and 330th Street received minor to moderate damage at high-end EF0 strength. The tornado continued northeast, destroying an outbuilding at EF1 intensity along Sycamore Road. The tornado intensified further along Keg Creek, several trees were snapped along the bank of the creek at EF2 intensity.

==== Peak intensity in Minden ====
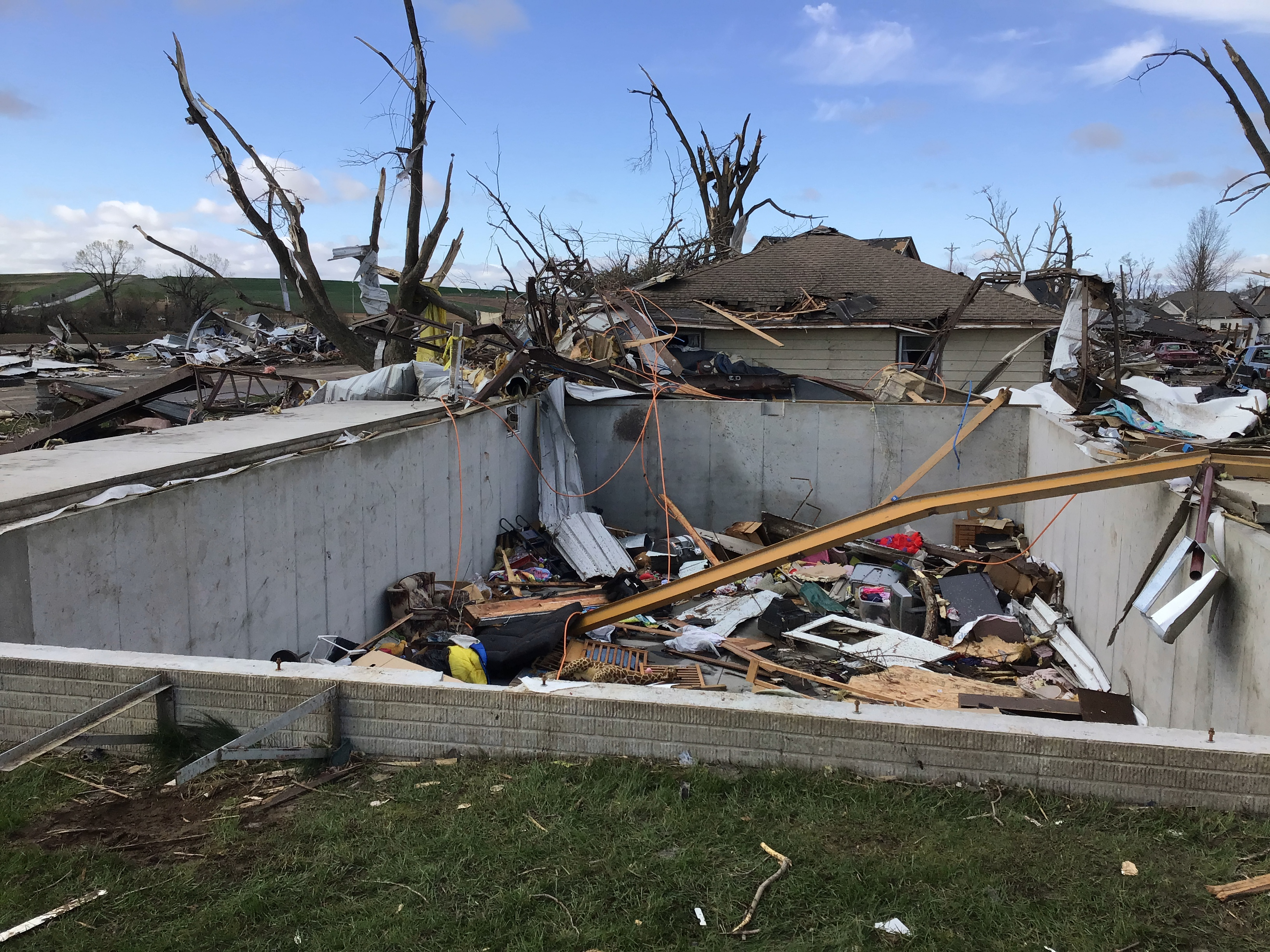
High-end EF3 damage to a poorly-anchored home in Minden.

National Weather Service at Omaha issued a tornado emergency for Minden and surrounding areas at 5:46 p.m. CDT. Several spotters noted multiple vortices exhibiting within the tornado. The tornado expanded to a width of 1,200 yards (1,100 m) as the tornado impacted the eastern portion of town. The tornado intensified slightly to mid-range EF2 strength along 340th Street. Tim's Automobile Service sustained collapse of load-bearing walls. Along the intersection of 340th Street and Main Street; a one-story home had its roof ripped off, a restaurant had half of its roof ripped off, and many trees were snapped and uprooted. Two homes along 4th and Depot Street were shifted off their foundation. The multi-vortex nature of the tornado caused an erratic degree of damage within the town, with EF1 level damage to EF3 level damage occurring at least 100 yards (91 m) apart. The tornado abruptly intensified to high-end EF3 strength, with estimated wind speeds up to 160 mph (260 km/h). A poorly anchored wooden home along Main Street was swept off its foundation. A 63-year-old man was heavily injured after being trapped his basement, later dying from his injuries. Across the street, the C&A Scale Services' fabrication plant buildings were destroyed. The S.V.C Livestock Products warehouse was flattened at high-end EF3 intensity.

Along 5th Street; low-end EF3 damage was done to home. The home suffered losses of their exterior wall, homes nearby sustained significant to major roof damage. The water treatment plant in Minden was destroyed at low-end EF3 intensity, and a temporary water plant was set up quickly after the tornado to restore water to the city. The tornado impacts the Harvest Alliance Church along Tamarack Avenue, completely destroying the structure at high-end EF2 intensity, a roof of a nearby home was ripped away. The tornado reaches a peak width of 1,900 yd (1,700 m) northeast of Minden. The tornado strengthened slightly to low-end EF3 with estimated winds speeds of 145 mph (233 km/h). One home was nearly leveled, with a few interior walls left standing. Further downstream along 345th Street, a poorly anchored was shifted off its foundation. The tornado weakened significantly to low-end EF2 strength along Whipperwheel Road. Many trees were snapped, and an outbuilding was overturned. The tornado crossed I-80 before exiting Pottawattamie County.

=== Harrison and Shelby Counties ===
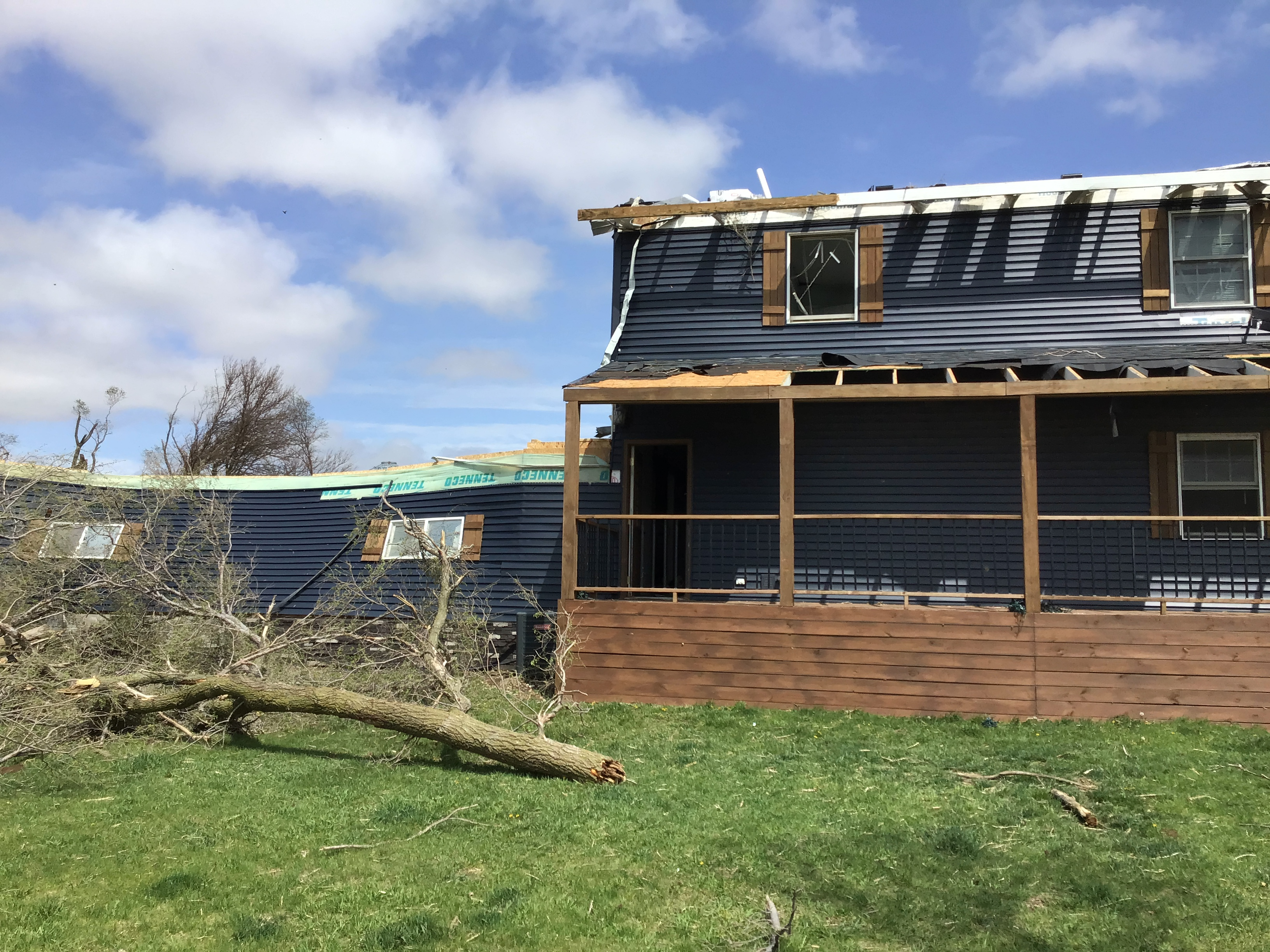
Roof ripped off a home north of Shelby, Iowa at EF2 intensity

At 5:49 p.m., a second tornado emergency was issued for the towns of Shelby and Tennant and surrounding areas. The tornado briefly entered Harrison County south of Magill at EF1 intensity. Several trees were snapped and a farm building experienced losses to their exterior walls at 97 mph (156 km/h) before the tornado crossed into Shelby County. The tornado maintained that intensity as it crossed Street F66 west of Shelby, causing moderate roof damage to a farmhouse. North of Shelby along 450th Street, the tornado restrengthen to EF2 status. A roof was sheared off of a home, with estimated wind speeds up to 122 mph (196 km/h). The tornado maintained EF2 intensity as it passed southeast of Tennant, inflicting severe roof damage to a farmhouse and demolishing two outbuildings along Street F58.

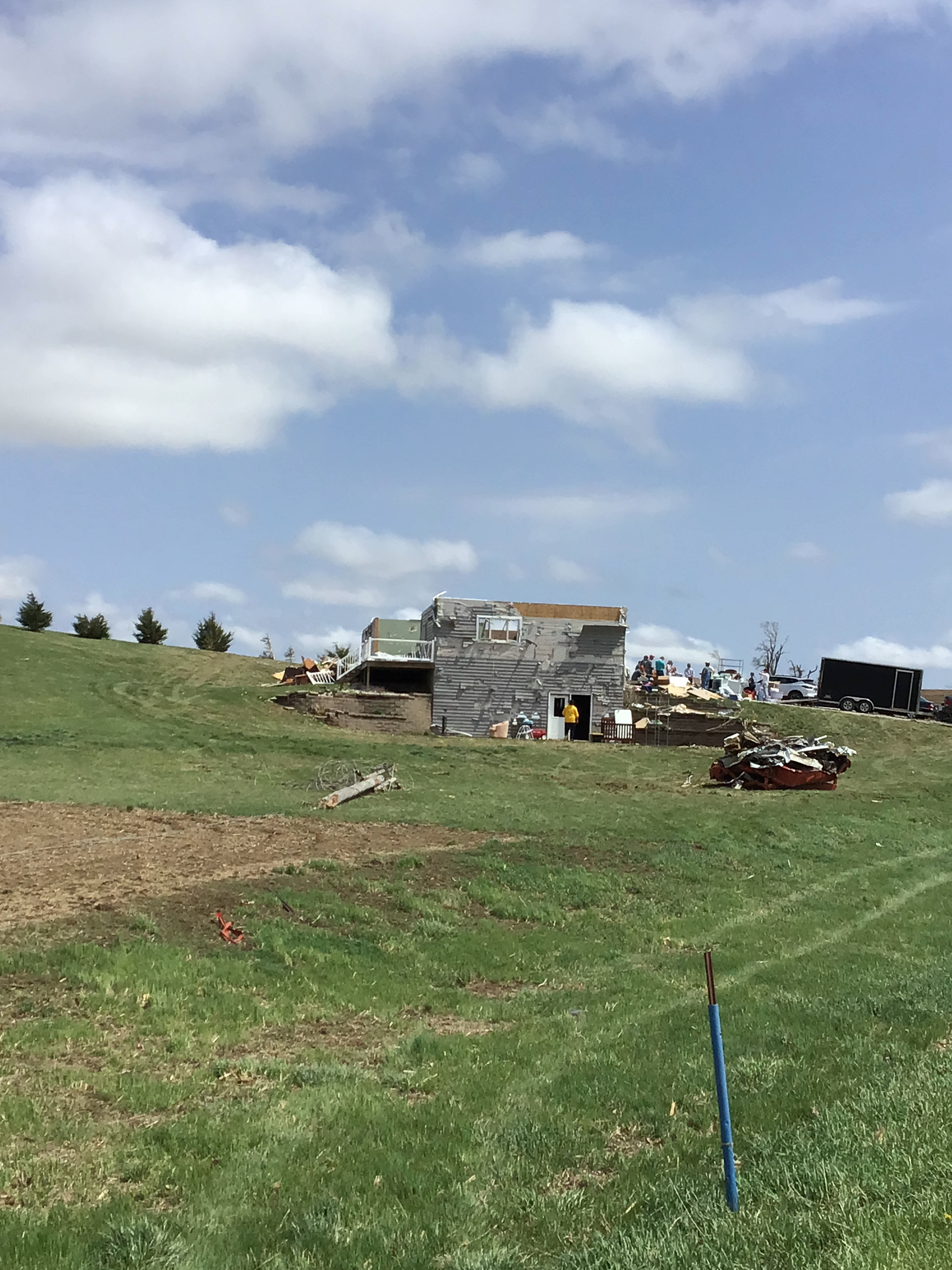
Low-end EF3 damage to a home west of Harlan, Iowa

Along the intersection of 750th Street and Hackberry Road, power poles were snapped. A home along 750th Street sustained moderate roof damage and a couple of outbuildings were heavily damaged. The tornado reached a peak width of 1,900 yards (1,700 m) for the second time around this area. Several hardwood trees along Hazel Road were substantially damaged. The tornado passed west of Harlan, crossing Iowa 44, intensifying to low-end EF3 intensity. A home was destroyed, with its roof torn out. Extensive tree damage occurred nearby, and a vehicle was thrown into a field. Along Ironwood Road, an outbuilding was significantly destroyed by the tornado. The tornado weakened down to low-end EF2 intensity along 1100th Street, downing multiple trees and damaging a roof of a farmhouse. The tornado strengthened slightly, several homes along US 59 sustained significant roof damage and numerous trees were snapped. The tornado began traveling near due north, paralleling US 59. Several outbuildings were demolished and roofs were damaged along Linden Road.

The tornado missed Defiance and became increasingly shrouded in precipitation, becoming rain-wrapped. It eventually dissipated to the north of the town around 6:29 p.m. CDT. The tornado was on the ground for just over an hour, traveling 40.91 miles (65.84 km), and reaching a peak width of 1,900 yards (1,700 m).

=== DOW observation ===
As the tornado was passing west of Harlan, a Doppler on Wheels unit recorded wind speeds of 224 mph (360 km/h) 600 metres (2,000 ft) aloft, well into the EF5 range; however no structures were impacted by these winds. As a result, the tornado retained an EF3 rating.

== Aftermath ==
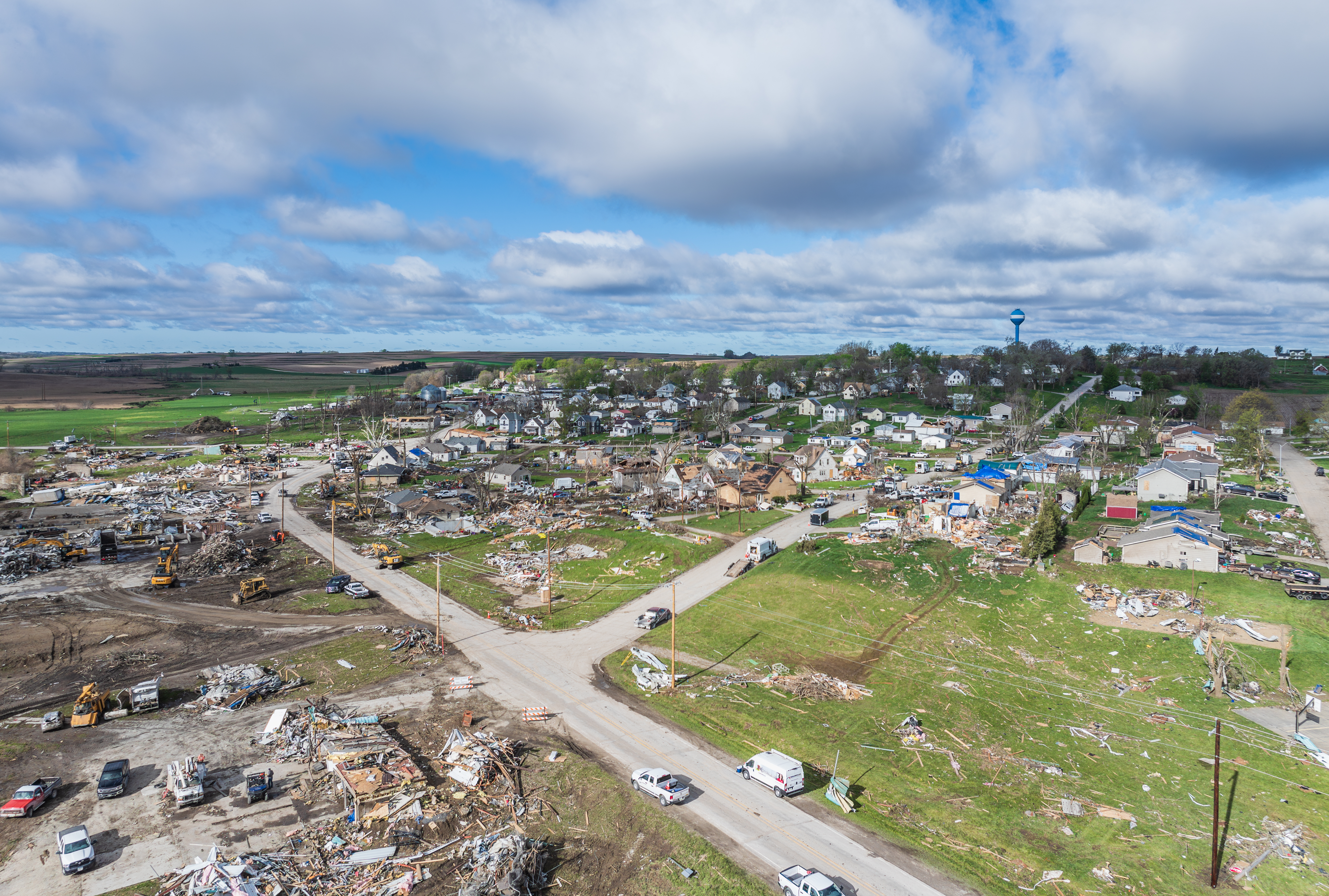
Major damage to homes and businesses in Minden after the tornado.

In Minden alone, the tornado caused damage to 180 residential homes in town, with 40% of them being destroyed. 90% of the business district was destroyed by the tornado. Overall, the tornado inflicted $12.2 million in property damage in Minden. In Shelby County, 74 farmsteads were struck by the tornado, throughout Shelby County, the tornado did an estimated $100 million in damage. Iowa governor, Kim Reynolds, approved major disaster declaration to Pottawattamie, Harrison, and Shelby counties in Iowa that were affected by the tornado. Kim Reynolds announced in June that a disaster recovery housing program was being submitted to FEMA, the program would provide federal funding for temporary housing to counties affected the spring tornadoes, including Minden. The Federal Emergency Management Agency (FEMA) opened Disaster Recovery Centers in Pottawattamie County and two other counties to provide help to people affected by the tornado. After the tornado, residents of Minden set up a community fund that supported clean up and rebuilding efforts for their community. On February 4, 2025, Iowa Economic Development Authority granted $1.2 million to Minden to build affordable housing to the area.

Pottawattamie County Emergency Management Agency announced the establishment of a Multi-Agency Resource Center to provide assistance to victims who survived the tornado in Pottawattamie County. Minden hosted the MARC, with 15 organizations scheduled to attend. Midstates Bank partnered up with The Community Foundation for Western Iowa to set up donation for Minden and other surrounding communities to help with local nonprofit organizations and recovery efforts. The Salvation Army Emergency Disaster Services teams arrived in Minden to provide food, water, and cleanup kits to residents. The teams also helped local officials with volunteer intake and assisted in meal service.

== See also ==
- 2024 Greenfield tornado, another devastating 2024 tornado in western Iowa
- List of F3, EF3, and IF3 tornadoes (2020–present)
- List of tornado emergencies
