= Munden =

Munden may refer to:

- Munden (surname)
- Munden, Kansas, a town in the United States
- Munden House, an estate in Hertfordshire, England
- Munden Point, Virginia, United States
- Great Munden, a village and civil parish in Hertfordshire, England
- Hann. Münden, a town in Germany
- Little Munden, a civil parish in Hertfordshire, England

== See also ==
- Minden (disambiguation)
- Mundane (disambiguation)
