= Munden (surname) =

Munden is a surname. The surname derives from Great Munden or Little Munden in Hertfordshire, England. People with the name include:

- Bob Munden
- Carri Munden
- Donald Munden
- John Munden
- Joseph Shepherd Munden
- Marc Munden
- Marwood Munden
- Paul Munden
- Richard Munden (British Army officer)
- Richard Munden (Royal Navy officer)
- Victor Munden
