= Minden Township =

Minden Township may refer to the following townships in the United States:

- Minden Township, Pottawattamie County, Iowa
- Minden Township, Michigan
- Minden Township, Benton County, Minnesota

See also: Minden (disambiguation)
