= Walnut, Iowa =

City in Pottawattamie County, Iowa, US

- City
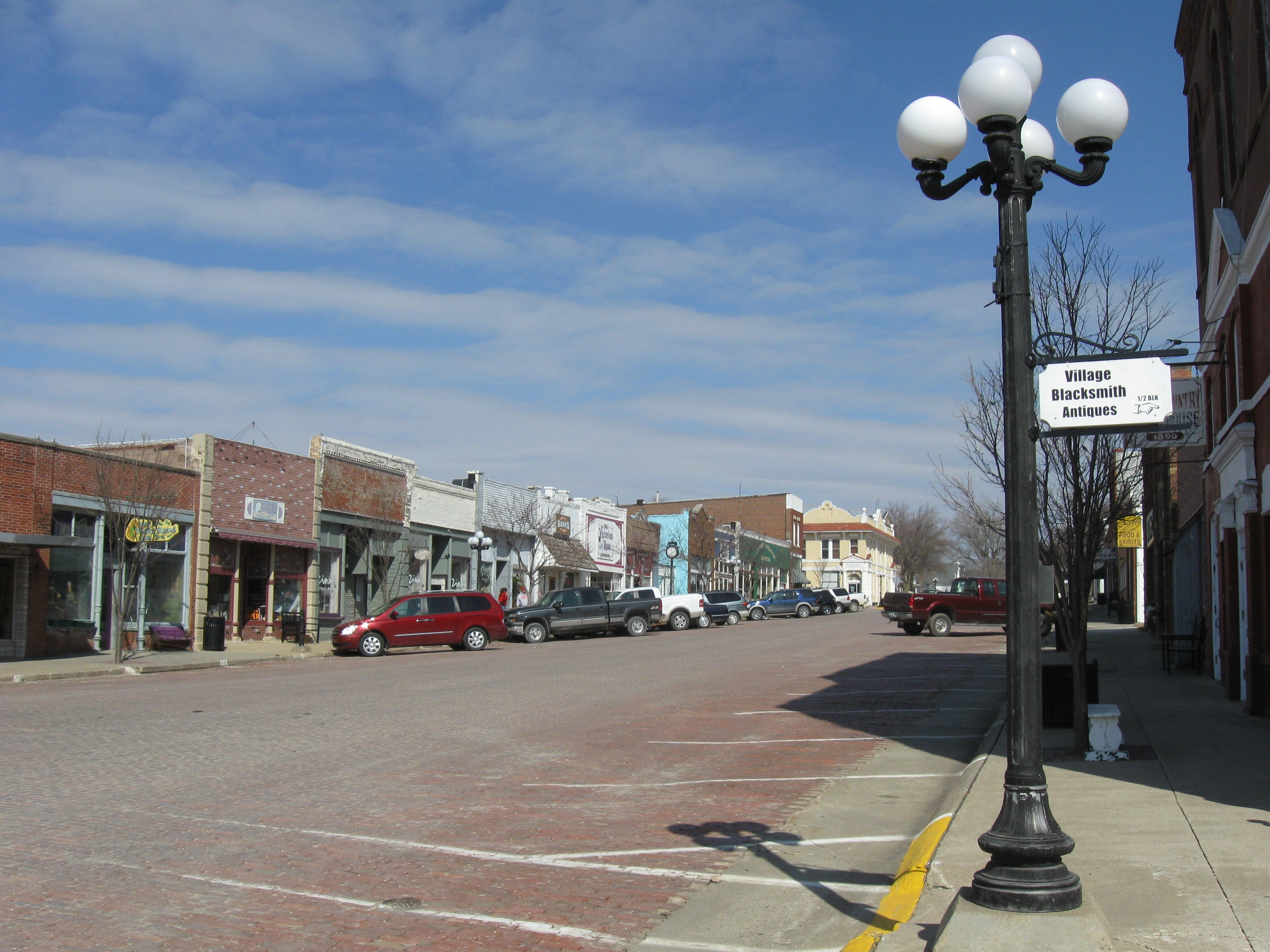
- Downtown Walnut

- Location of Walnut, Iowa

- Location within Iowa Location within the United States
- Coordinates: 41°29′42″N 95°12′58″W
- Country: USA
- State: Iowa
- County: Pottawattamie
- Township: Layton

Area
  - Total: 2.20 sq mi (5.69 km^{2})
  - Land: 2.20 sq mi (5.69 km^{2})
  - Water: 0 sq mi (0.00 km^{2})
- Elevation: 1,342 ft (409 m)

Population (2020)
  - Total: 747
  - Density: 339.8/sq mi (131.21/km^{2})
- Time zone: UTC-6 (Central (CST))
  - Summer (DST): UTC-5 (CDT)
- ZIP code: 51577
- Area code: 712
- FIPS code: 19-82065
- GNIS feature ID: 2397180
- Website: City of Walnut

Walnut is a city in Pottawattamie County, Iowa, United States. The population was 747 at the time of the 2020 census. Walnut is located on Interstate 80 and is famous for its many antique stores. In recent years Walnut has become a regional center of wind turbine electrical generation.

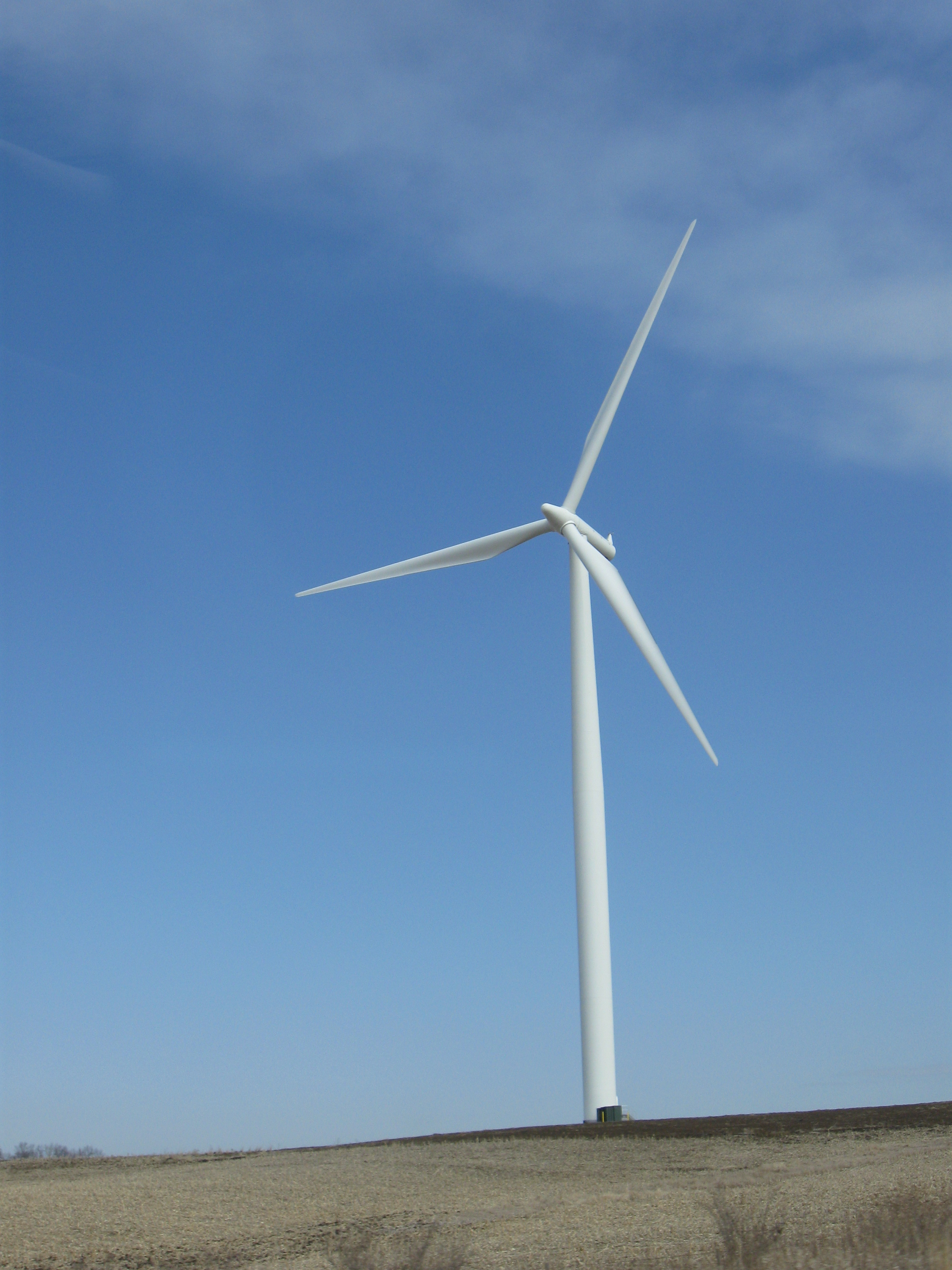
Wind turbine near Walnut.

== History ==
Walnut was incorporated as a city in 1877.

== Geography ==
According to the United States Census Bureau, the city has a total area of 2.15 square miles (5.57 km^{2}), all land.

== Demographics ==
Historical populations
Year	Pop.	±%
1880	733	—
1890	811	+10.6%
1900	878	+8.3%
1910	950	+8.2%
1920	1,072	+12.8%
1930	935	−12.8%
1940	902	−3.5%
1950	888	−1.6%
1960	777	−12.5%
1970	870	+12.0%
1980	897	+3.1%
1990	857	−4.5%
2000	778	−9.2%
2010	785	+0.9%
2020	747	−4.8%
Source:"U.S. Census website". United States Census Bureau. and Iowa Data Center; Source: U.S. Decennial Census

=== 2020 census ===
As of the census of 2020, there were 747 people, 312 households, and 199 families residing in the city. The population density was 339.8 inhabitants per square mile (131.2/km^{2}). There were 344 housing units at an average density of 156.5 per square mile (60.4/km^{2}). The racial makeup of the city was 94.9% White, 0.1% Black or African American, 0.1% Native American, 0.7% Asian, 0.0% Pacific Islander, 0.9% from other races and 3.2% from two or more races. Hispanic or Latino persons of any race comprised 2.1% of the population.

Of the 312 households, 29.2% of which had children under the age of 18 living with them, 50.6% were married couples living together, 5.4% were cohabitating couples, 21.2% had a female householder with no spouse or partner present and 22.8% had a male householder with no spouse or partner present. 36.2% of all households were non-families. 31.4% of all households were made up of individuals, 17.0% had someone living alone who was 65 years old or older.

The median age in the city was 43.8 years. 25.4% of the residents were under the age of 20; 4.0% were between the ages of 20 and 24; 22.8% were from 25 and 44; 20.6% were from 45 and 64; and 27.2% were 65 years of age or older. The gender makeup of the city was 49.8% male and 50.2% female.

=== 2010 census ===
As of the census of 2010, there were 785 people, 354 households, and 214 families living in the city. The population density was 365.1 inhabitants per square mile (141.0/km^{2}). There were 411 housing units at an average density of 191.2 per square mile (73.8/km^{2}). The racial makeup of the city was 96.9% White, 1.0% African American, 0.8% Asian, 0.4% from other races, and 0.9% from two or more races. Hispanic or Latino of any race were 1.4% of the population.

There were 354 households, of which 23.4% had children under the age of 18 living with them, 48.9% were married couples living together, 7.3% had a female householder with no husband present, 4.2% had a male householder with no wife present, and 39.5% were non-families. 34.7% of all households were made up of individuals, and 21.2% had someone living alone who was 65 years of age or older. The average household size was 2.22 and the average family size was 2.85.

The median age in the city was 46.9 years. 22.5% of residents were under the age of 18; 6.2% were between the ages of 18 and 24; 18.6% were from 25 to 44; 31.4% were from 45 to 64; and 21.4% were 65 years of age or older. The gender makeup of the city was 47.1% male and 52.9% female.

=== 2000 census ===
As of the census of 2000, there were 778 people, 326 households, and 231 families living in the city. The population density was 362.8 inhabitants per square mile (140.1/km^{2}). There were 350 housing units at an average density of 163.2 per square mile (63.0/km^{2}). The racial makeup of the city was 97.56% White, 0.51% African American, 0.39% Asian, and 1.54% from two or more races. Hispanic or Latino of any race were 0.77% of the population.

There were 326 households, out of which 28.5% had children under the age of 18 living with them, 61.7% were married couples living together, 6.1% had a female householder with no husband present, and 29.1% were non-families. 27.3% of all households were made up of individuals, and 15.3% had someone living alone who was 65 years of age or older. The average household size was 2.39 and the average family size was 2.88.

25.2% are under the age of 18, 6.4% from 18 to 24, 22.5% from 25 to 44, 26.0% from 45 to 64, and 19.9% who were 65 years of age or older. The median age was 42 years. For every 100 females, there were 95.5 males. For every 100 females age 18 and over, there were 89.6 males.

The median income for a household in the city was $36,154, and the median income for a family was $44,500. Males had a median income of $29,464 versus $18,750 for females. The per capita income for the city was $16,489. About 5.2% of families and 8.5% of the population were below the poverty line, including 14.9% of those under age 18 and 2.6% of those age 65 or over.

== Education ==
The community is served by the AHSTW Community School District. It was in the Walnut Community School District until July 1, 2016, when that district merged into AHSTW.

In 1910 the Walnut School opened. In the 1950s the Walnut School building received an addition on its north side. There were other additions. By 2016 the Walnut school closed, and the four of five city council members voted to have the city buy the school, with one council member voting against. The city government will raze the addition.

== Notable person ==
- Arnold W. Jacobsen, major general in the United States Marine Corps during World War II
