= AHSTW Community School District =

Public school district in Iowa, United States

Coordinates: 41.469562°N 95.341800°W

Location
- [Avoca, Iowa] Cass, Harrison, Pottawattamie, and Shelby counties United States
- Coordinates: 41.469562, -95.341800

District information
- Type: Local school district
- Grades: K-12
- Established: 2016
- Superintendent: Darin Jones
- Schools: 1
- Budget: $12,802,000(2020-21)
- NCES District ID: 1904080

Students and staff
- Students: 776 (2022-23)
- Teachers: 58.57 FTE
- Staff: 64.84 FTE
- Student–teacher ratio: 13.25
- Athletic conference: Western Iowa
- District mascot: Vikings
- Colors: Red, White, and Blue

Other information
- Website: www.ahstwschools.org

A-H-S-T-W Community School District is a rural public school district headquartered in Avoca, Iowa.

The district, with about 250 square miles (650 km^{2}) of area, serves sections of Cass, Harrison, Pottawattamie, and Shelby counties. It serves Avoca, Hancock, Shelby, Walnut, and much of Tennant. The initials of the five cities form the name of the school district.

== History ==
It was formed by the merger of the A-H-S-T Community School District and the Walnut Community School District on July 1, 2016. About 88% of the voters in the combined area favored consolidation in the vote.

The initial school board was to be simply a combination of the existing A-H-S-T-W and Walnut districts, with a total of seven members: two from Walnut and the remainder from A-H-S-T-W. The prospective future board would have seven members, with two at-large and the remainder based on voting districts. The proportion was set since the former Walnut district had about one-fourth of the population of the combined A-H-S-T-W district.

== Schools ==
The district operates three schools in a single facility in Avoca:

- A-H-S-T-W Primary
- A-H-S-T-W Intermediate
- A-H-S-T-W High School

=== School expansion ===
Circa 2015, the middle school area of the A-H-S-T-W Secondary School building in Avoca was scheduled to receive an expansion. Now in 2023, they are adding on to the area of the A-H-S-T-W Secondary School area.

=== A-H-S-T-W High School ===
==== Athletics ====
The Vikings compete in the Western Iowa Conference in the following sports:

- Volleyball
- Football
- Basketball
- Golf
- Baseball
- Softball

== See also ==
- List of school districts in Iowa
- List of high schools in Iowa
