= Mindon =

Mindon may refer to:

- Mindon Min, king of Burma
- Mindon, Burma, a town
- Mindon, Uzbekistan, a town
- Mindon Township, whose seat is Mindon, Burma
- Mindon, a Roman fort (now Öğündük, İdil in Turkey)

== See also ==
- Minden (disambiguation)
