= Walnut Community School District =

Defunct school district in Iowa, United States

Walnut Community School District was a school district headquartered in Walnut, Iowa.

== History ==
The first school in Walnut began operations in 1872. In 1875 the school had 25 students; that year its first permanent building, with a cost of $5,000, opened; it was destroyed in a fire in 1913. A replacement building opened later and served as the school building into the 21st century.

The current building opened in 1910 the Walnut School opened. In the 1950s the Walnut School building received an addition on its north side. There were other additions.

In the 1950s the school district was reorganized.

In 2012 the Walnut district and the A-H-S-T Community School District began partial-day-sharing, in which students went to one school for some courses, as well as sharing of athletic programs. In 2014 the district began whole grade-sharing, in one school district sent its children to another school district to attend schools there all day. Walnut had pressure to merge as its student enrollment had one of the most significant student population declines in Iowa in the early 2010s; it was reduced by about 25% between 2010 and 2014. In 2015 A-H-S-T was three times larger than Walnut. From circa 2011 to 2016, of all Iowa district's, Walnut had the largest drop in the number of enrolled students. If the Walnut district did not merge, in the following school years its spending could have increased beyond the amount permissible under Iowa law. In the 2015–2016 school year the district had 72 students.

The election for the school district merger was scheduled for September 8, 2015 after the Green Hills Area Education Agency approved of the merger proposal and election, as it had received enough signatures on the merger petition. The vote was approved by 77% of the Walnut voters and 94% of those within A-H-S-T, with a combined total of 614 for and 74 against. With all voters combined, the percentage favoring consolidation was 88%. On July 1, 2016, the A-H-S-T district merged with the Walnut district to form the AHSTW Community School District. The prospective combined enrollment was to be around 770 students.
