= Arnold W. Jacobsen =

United States Marine Corps general

Arnold Windom Jacobsen
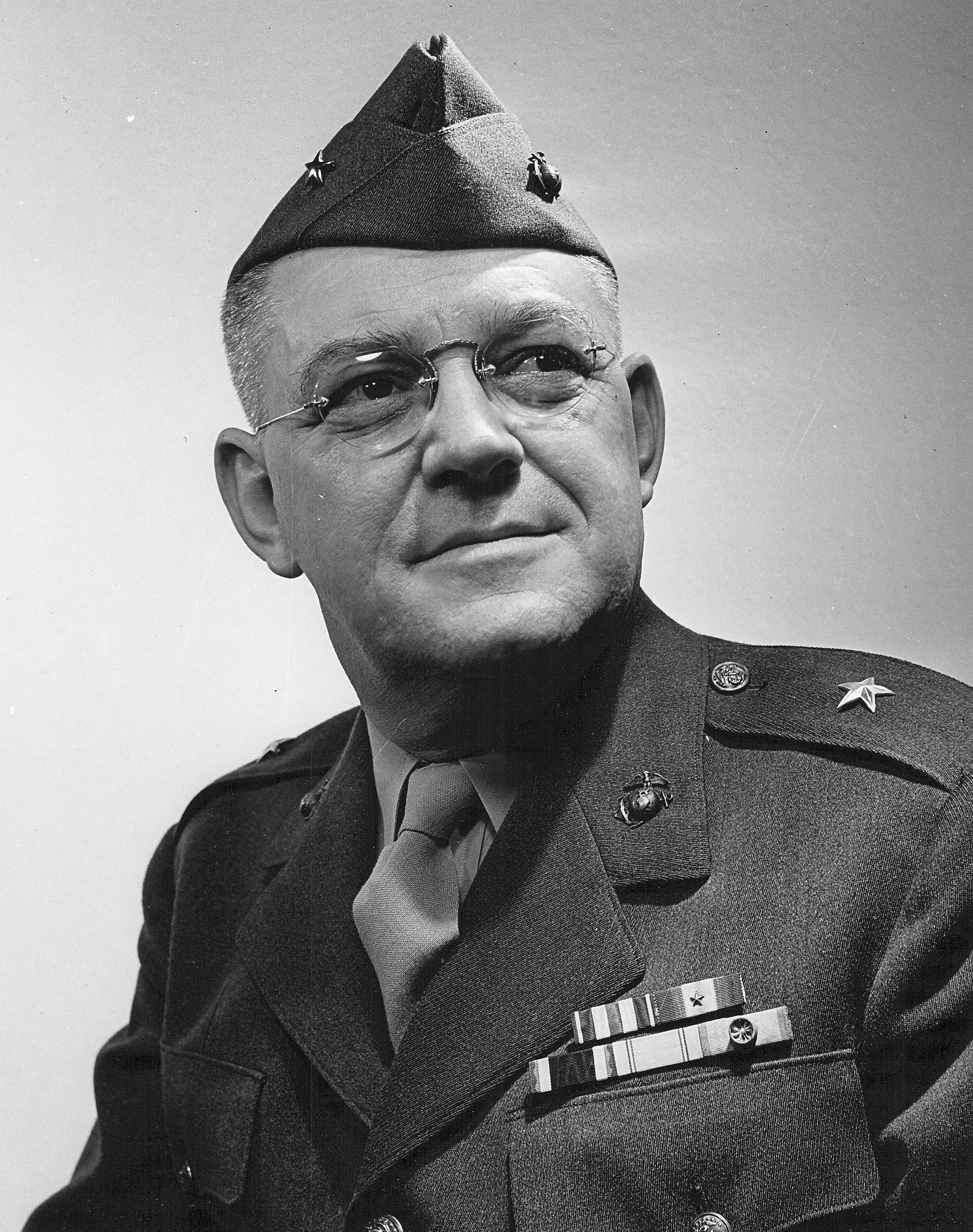
- Jacobsen as brigadier general, USMC
- Born: May 9, 1892; Walnut, Iowa, U.S.
- Died: March 22, 1970 (aged 77)
- Burial place: Arlington National Cemetery
- Military career
- Allegiance: United States of America
- Branch: United States Marine Corps
- Service years: 1916–1946
- Rank: Major general
- Service number: 0-471
- Commands: Depot of Supplies, San Francisco
- Conflicts: World War I: Meuse-Argonne Offensive; Haitian Campaign World War II
- Awards: Silver Star; Legion of Merit

Arnold Windom Jacobsen (May 9, 1892 – March 22, 1970) was an officer of the United States Marine Corps with the rank of major general, who served as commanding officer of the Marine Corps Supplies Depots during World War II and was responsible for the equipment and supplies of the Marine Corps units overseas.

== Early career ==
Jacobsen was born on 9 May 1892 in Walnut, Iowa, and attended the United States Naval Academy in Annapolis, Maryland. He graduated on 2 June 1916 and was commissioned second lieutenant in the Marine Corps on the same date. Jacobsen was assigned to the Marine Barracks at Quantico, Virginia, before he was transferred to the 6th Marine Regiment. He was quickly promoted to the rank of first lieutenant in August 1916. The regiment went overseas in 1917, but Jacobsen stayed at Quantico. He was promoted to the rank of captain in March 1917.

Jacobsen finally sailed for France on 26 August 1918 and was given command of 84th Company, 3rd Battalion, 6th Marine Regiment. He subsequently served during the Meuse-Argonne Offensive and distinguished himself while commanded his company during the capture of the town of Bayonville. Jacobsen organized the Field hospital under heavy enemy fire, when used captured German Army Medical Staff. He was subsequently decorated with the Silver Star for his merits during the battle based on the recommendation of his battalion commander, Major George K. Shuler.

His official Silver Star citation reads follows:

Captain Arnold Windom Jacobsen displayed unusual courage and resourcefulness during the attack on the Argonne sector. Although under fire for the first time, he bravely and coolly led his 84th Company to its objective. Upon reaching his objective in the town of Bayonville, he organized a first aid station by utilizing the services of a German doctor and his assistant, and personally arranged for the care of the wounded in the town..

== Interwar period ==
Jacobsen subsequently served with the Occupation forces in Germany until he was ordered back to the United States in May 1919. He was then assigned to the Marine detachment and sailed to Camagüey, Cuba, where he participated in the protection of sugar production.

Captain Jacobsen returned to the United States in May 1920 and was assigned to the Marine barracks within Washington Navy Yard. He remained in Washington D.C., until July 1921, when he was transferred to the Office of the Judge Advocate General of the Navy. While served there, he attended George Washington University Law School and graduated in summer 1924 with the Master of Laws degree.

Jacobsen was subsequently appointed commander of the Marine detachment aboard the battleship USS West Virginia on 26 August 1924 and served almost two years at sea. He was back in States in September 1926 and was assigned to the Senior course at Army Infantry School at Fort Benning, Georgia.

He graduated from the course in June 1927 and served tour of duty at Marine Corps Base Quantico, Virginia, until he was transferred to the Marine barracks within Brooklyn Navy Yard at the end of July 1930. Jacobsen was already promoted to the rank of major on 6 November 1929. He was subsequently assigned to the 1st Brigade of Marines and sent to Port-au-Prince, Haiti. Jacobsen participated in occupation duties in Haiti until complete withdrawal of the Marine Forces on 1 August 1934. He was decorated with the Haitian National Order of Honour and Merit, Grade Officer for his service there.

Jacobsen was subsequently appointed an instructor at Marine Corps School within Quantico Base. He served there for next four years and during this time was promoted to the rank of lieutenant colonel in March 1935. Jacobsen was transferred to the Marine barracks at Philadelphia Naval Shipyard in June 1938 and was appointed to the capacity of assistant quartermaster of the Depot of Supply.

== World War II ==
A very important assignment came on 5 July 1940, when Colonel Jacobsen (promoted on 1 July 1940) was transferred to the Headquarters Marine Corps in Washington, D.C., where he was appointed assistant to the quartermaster general of the Marine Corps, Major General Seth Williams.

In December 1942, Jacobsen was appointed commanding officer of the Marine Corps Depot of Supplies at San Francisco, California. He remained in this capacity for the duration of the war. Jacobsen was responsible for the bulk of equipment and supplies for all Marine forces in the Pacific. Under his jurisdiction, he was also responsible for the depot of supplies at Barstow, California, and forwarding depot at Naval Station at Seattle. During his service in this capacity, Jacobsen was promoted to the rank of brigadier general on 30 April 1944.

He served in this capacity until March 1946, when he was relieved of active duties, awaiting retirement. Jacobsen was placed on the retired list in July of the same year and advanced to the rank of major general for having been specially commended in combat. He was also decorated with the Legion of Merit for his service during the War.

=== Legion of Merit citation ===
His official Legion of Merit citation reads follows:

The President of the United States of America takes pleasure in presenting the Legion of Merit to Brigadier General Arnold Windom Jacobsen (MCSN: 0-471), United States Marine Corps, for exceptionally meritorious conduct in the performance of outstanding services to the Government of the United States as commanding officer of the United States Marine Corps Depot of Supplies, San Francisco, California. By exercising sound organizational ability and leadership General Jacobsen directed the development of plans for expansion and handling the overseas supply problems of all Marines in the Pacific Ocean area. He was responsible for the establishment of a smooth working method of furnishing and shipping supplies to all overseas Marine Corps units. Through his foresight and thorough knowledge of the problems to be met, he rendered invaluable assistance to the Corps in keeping a smooth flow of supplies being fed into the pipe lines supplying all combat areas.

== Decorations ==

1st Row	Silver Star		Legion of Merit	
2nd Row	World War I Victory Medal with one battle clasps	Army of Occupation of Germany Medal	Marine Corps Expeditionary Medal with one star	American Defense Service Medal
3rd Row	American Campaign Medal	Asiatic-Pacific Campaign Medal	World War II Victory Medal	Haitian National Order of Honour and Merit, Grade Officer
