= Avoca, Iowa =

- City
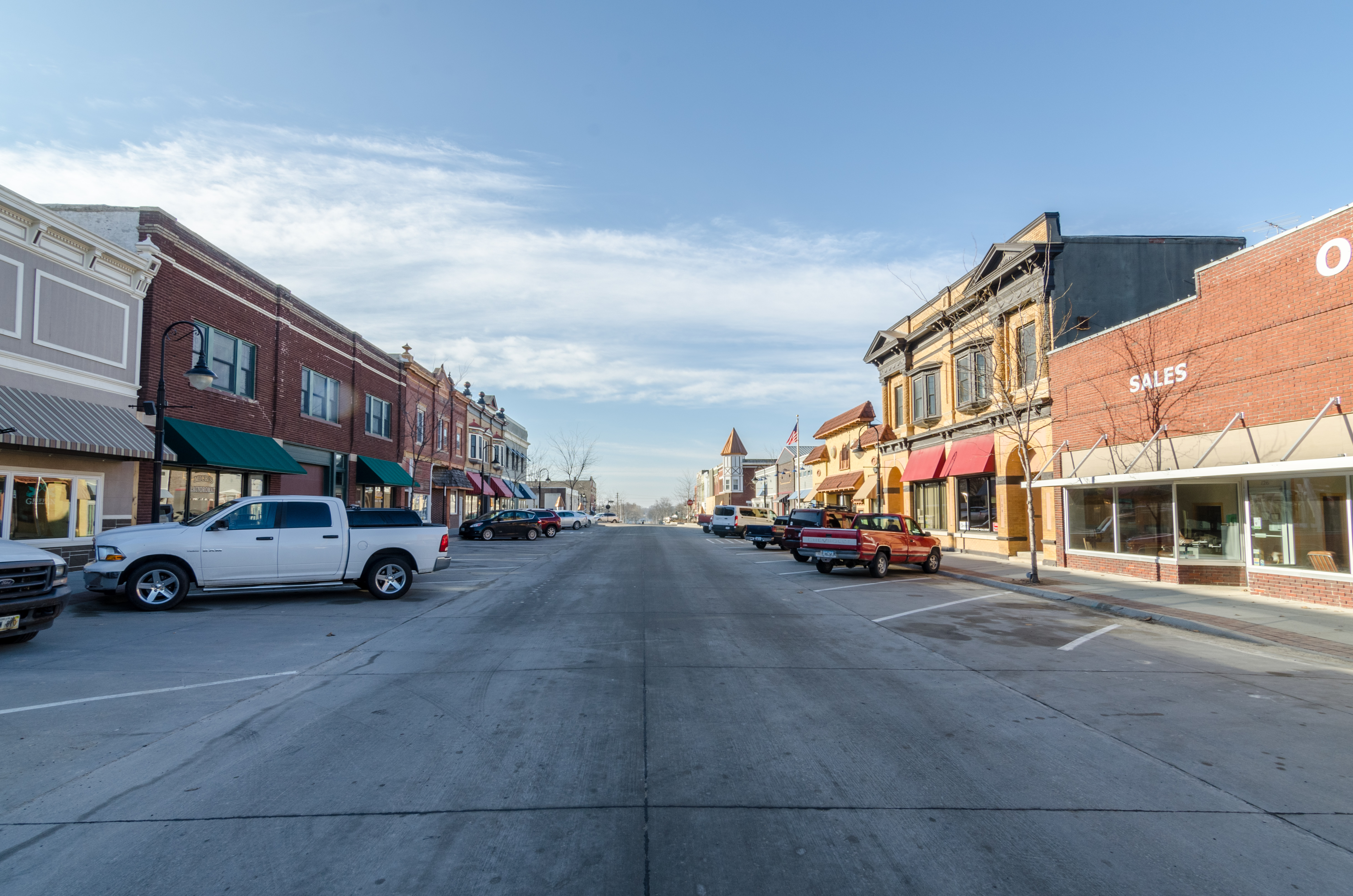
- Downtown Avoca, Iowa

- Location of Avoca, Iowa

- Location within Iowa Location within the United States
- Coordinates: 41°28′58″N 95°20′14″W
- Country: United States
- State: Iowa
- County: Pottawattamie
- Township: Knox

Government
  - Type: Mayor-council
  - Mayor: Mike Bodrug

Area
  - Total: 2.38 sq mi (6.17 km^{2})
  - Land: 2.38 sq mi (6.17 km^{2})
  - Water: 0 sq mi (0.00 km^{2})
- Elevation: 1,155 ft (352 m)

Population (2020)
  - Total: 1,683
  - Density: 706/sq mi (273/km^{2})
- Time zone: UTC-6 (Central (CST))
  - Summer (DST): UTC-5 (CDT)
- ZIP code: 51521
- Area code: 712
- FIPS code: 19-03970
- GNIS feature ID: 2394042
- Website: City of Avoca

Avoca (Irish: Abhóca, meaning 'the meeting of the waters') is a city in Pottawattamie County, Iowa, United States. The population was 1,683 at the 2020 census.

== History ==
Avoca was founded in 1869 in connection with the construction of the Chicago, Rock Island and Pacific Railroad through the area. The city is named after a place mentioned in the Thomas Moore poem "The Meeting of the Waters," about the River Avoca in Ireland. Avoca quickly developed as a regional service center for the surrounding farms.

In 2005, Avoca opened a local pool.

The Pottawatomie County, Iowa county government maintains a second courthouse in Avoca to serve the northeastern portion of the county. Council Bluffs, which is the county seat is in the extreme southwestern part of this large county.

== Geography ==
The city is situated within Iowa's Loess Hills and located between the West Nishnabotna River and its East Branch. According to the United States Census Bureau, the city has a total area of 2.13 square miles (5.52 km^{2}), all land.

== Demographics ==
Historical populations
Year	Pop.	±%
1900	1,627	—
1910	1,520	−6.6%
1920	1,482	−2.5%
1930	1,673	+12.9%
1940	1,598	−4.5%
1950	1,595	−0.2%
1960	1,540	−3.4%
1970	1,535	−0.3%
1980	1,650	+7.5%
1990	1,497	−9.3%
2000	1,610	+7.5%
2010	1,506	−6.5%
2020	1,683	+11.8%
Source:"U.S. Census website". United States Census Bureau. and Iowa Data Center; Source: U.S. Decennial Census

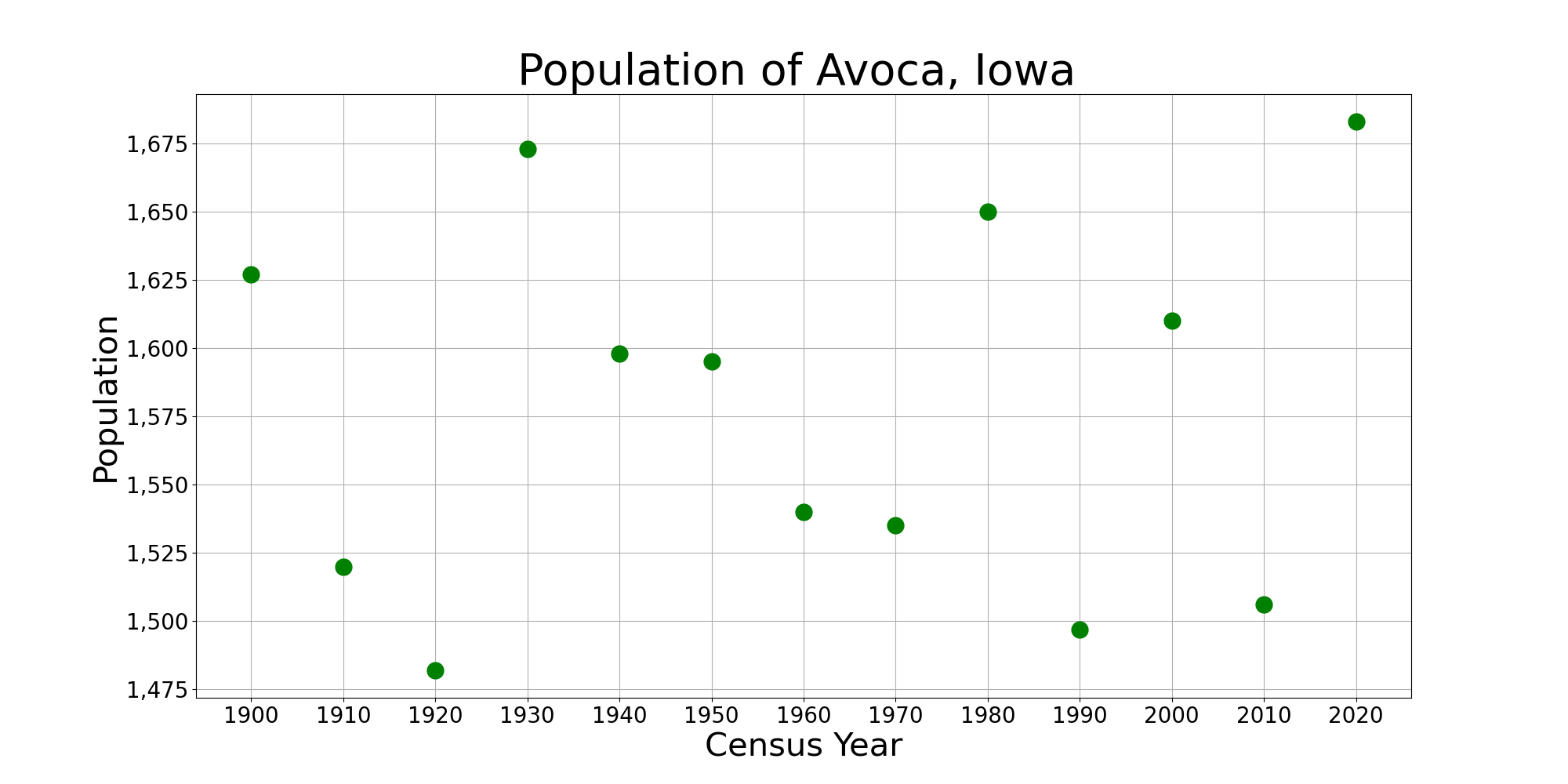
The population of Avoca, Iowa from US census data

=== 2020 census ===
As of the 2020 census, there were 1,683 people, 704 households, and 429 families residing in the city. The median age was 42.1 years. 22.8% of residents were under the age of 18. 25.7% of residents were under the age of 20; 6.1% were between the ages of 20 and 24; 21.8% were from 25 to 44; 24.6% were from 45 to 64; and 21.8% were 65 years of age or older. The gender makeup of the city was 49.3% male and 50.7% female. For every 100 females there were 97.1 males, and for every 100 females age 18 and over there were 90.5 males age 18 and over.

The population density was 706.4 inhabitants per square mile (272.7/km^{2}). There were 767 housing units at an average density of 321.9 per square mile (124.3/km^{2}). 30.7% of households had children under the age of 18 living with them. Of all households, 44.3% were married-couple households, 19.0% were households with a male householder and no spouse or partner present, and 28.4% were households with a female householder and no spouse or partner present. 8.2% were cohabiting couples. 39.1% of all households were non-families. 33.4% of all households were made up of individuals, and 16.7% had someone living alone who was 65 years of age or older. Of the housing units, 8.2% were vacant. The homeowner vacancy rate was 2.7% and the rental vacancy rate was 9.1%.

0.0% of residents lived in urban areas, while 100.0% lived in rural areas.

Racial composition as of the 2020 census
Race	Number	Percent
White	1,549	92.0%
Black or African American	11	0.7%
American Indian and Alaska Native	12	0.7%
Asian	13	0.8%
Native Hawaiian and Other Pacific Islander	0	0.0%
Some other race	22	1.3%
Two or more races	76	4.5%
Hispanic or Latino (of any race)	63	3.7%

=== 2010 census ===
At the 2010 census, there were 1,567 people, 667 households, and 436 families living in the city. The population density was 707.0 inhabitants per square mile (273.0/km^{2}). There were 711 housing units at an average density of 333.8 per square mile (128.9/km^{2}). The racial makeup of the city was 98.8% White, 0.2% African American, 0.1% Native American, 0.1% Asian, 0.1% from other races, and 0.6% from two or more races. Hispanics or Latinos of any race were 1.9%.

Of the 662 households, 28.5% had children under the age of 18 living with them, 51.7% were married couples living together, 9.5% had a female householder with no husband present, 4.7% had a male householder with no wife present, and 34.1% were non-families. 29.9% of households were one person, and 13.3% were one person aged 65 or older. The average household size was 2.27, and the average family size was 2.78.

The median age was 43.2 years. 23.4% of residents were under the age of 18; 6.1% were between the ages of 18 and 24; 22.4% were from 25 to 44; 29.3% were from 45 to 64; and 18.7% were 65 or older. The gender makeup of the city was 48.9% male and 51.1% female.

=== 2000 census ===
At the 2000 census there were 1,610 people, 666 households, and 458 families living in the city. The population density was 830.6 inhabitants per square mile (320.7/km^{2}). There were 706 housing units at an average density of 364.2 per square mile (140.6/km^{2}). The racial makeup of the city was 99.19% White, 0.06% African American, 0.06% Asian, 0.06% from other races, and 0.62% from two or more races. Hispanic or Latino of any race were 1.37%.

Of the 666 households 29.3% had children under the age of 18 living with them, 58.1% were married couples living together, 6.9% had a female householder with no husband present, and 31.1% were non-families. 27.6% of households were one person and 15.3% were one person aged 65 or older. The average household size was 2.35 and the average family size was 2.85.

23.2% are under the age of 18, 7.6% from 18 to 24, 25.0% from 25 to 44, 22.7% from 45 to 64, and 21.4% 65 or older. The median age was 41 years. For every 100 females, there were 94.0 males. For every 100 females age 18 and over, there were 87.6 males.

The median household income was $39,826 and the median family income was $45,000. Males had a median income of $30,272 versus $20,284 for females. The per capita income for the city was $20,908. About 1.5% of families and 3.5% of the population were below the poverty line, including 4.8% of those under age 18 and 4.8% of those age 65 or over.

== Education ==
The community is served by the AHSTW Community School District. In 1957 Avoca combined with the city of Hancock to form the Avo-Ha Community School District. On July 1, 1996, the district merged into the A-H-S-T Community School District combining with nearby towns of Shelby and Tennant. In turn, the conglomerate merged into AHSTW on July 1, 2016, when the small town of Walnut joined.

== Notable people ==
- Richard Beymer (born 1938), the actor best known as Tony, the lead role in West Side Story
- Johnny Carson (1925–2005), the television comedian, lived in Avoca as a child until his family moved to Norfolk, Nebraska in 1936.
- Edwin T. Meredith (1876–1928), Secretary of Agriculture under president Woodrow Wilson
- Richard C. Turner (1927–1986), Iowa lawyer and politician, was born in Avoca.
