= Minden, Iowa =

- City
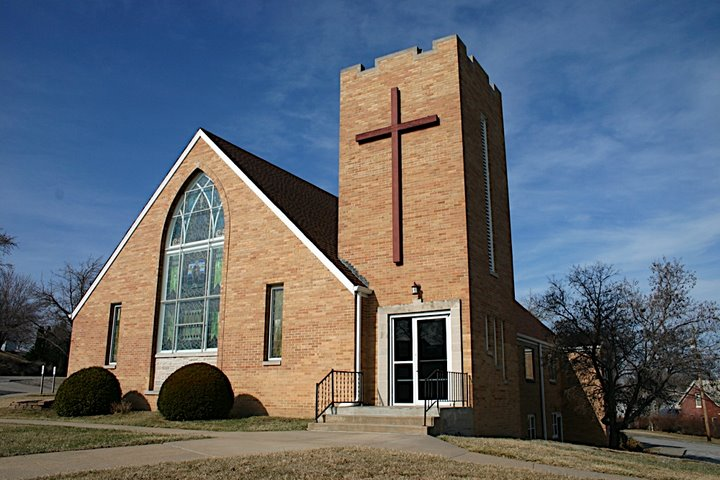
- Minden United Church of Christ (2009)

- Location of Minden, Iowa
- Coordinates: 41°28′12″N 95°32′35″W
- Country: United States
- State: Iowa
- County: Pottawattamie
- Township: Minden

Area
  - Total: 0.57 sq mi (1.48 km^{2})
  - Land: 0.57 sq mi (1.47 km^{2})
  - Water: 0.0039 sq mi (0.01 km^{2})
- Elevation: 1,253 ft (382 m)

Population (2020)
  - Total: 600
  - Density: 1,058.7/sq mi (408.76/km^{2})
- Time zone: UTC-6 (Central (CST))
  - Summer (DST): UTC-5 (CDT)
- ZIP code: 51553
- Area code: 712
- FIPS code: 19-52590
- GNIS feature ID: 2395340
- Website: mindeniowa.com

Minden is a city in Pottawattamie County, Iowa, United States. The population was 600 at the time of the 2020 census.

== History ==
It has had a post office since 1875.

On April 26, 2024, Minden was hit by a large EF3 wedge tornado, as part of a much larger tornado outbreak that affected the Great Plains region. A single fatality and 4 injuries were reported, and the city suffered extensive damage, with estimates of 40 to 50 homes destroyed, and some structures deemed completely lost. This came 48 years after a similarly destructive F4 tornado ripped through the town in 1976.

== Geography ==
According to the United States Census Bureau, the city has a total area of 0.43 square miles (1.11 km^{2}), of which 0.42 square miles (1.09 km^{2}) is land and 0.01 square miles (0.03 km^{2}) is water.

== Demographics ==
Historical populations
Year	Pop.	±%
1890	287	—
1900	328	+14.3%
1910	423	+29.0%
1920	381	−9.9%
1930	377	−1.0%
1940	310	−17.8%
1950	328	+5.8%
1960	355	+8.2%
1970	433	+22.0%
1980	483	+11.5%
1990	539	+11.6%
2000	564	+4.6%
2010	599	+6.2%
2020	600	+0.2%
Source: U.S. Decennial Census

=== 2020 census ===
As of the census of 2020, there were 600 people, 233 households, and 173 families residing in the city. The population density was 1,058.7 inhabitants per square mile (408.8/km^{2}). There were 251 housing units at an average density of 442.9 per square mile (171.0/km^{2}). The racial makeup of the city was 95.3% White, 0.5% Black or African American, 0.0% Native American, 0.0% Asian, 0.0% Pacific Islander, 0.3% from other races and 3.8% from two or more races. Hispanic or Latino persons of any race comprised 1.8% of the population.

Of the 233 households, 40.3% of which had children under the age of 18 living with them, 56.2% were married couples living together, 6.0% were cohabitating couples, 16.3% had a female householder with no spouse or partner present and 21.5% had a male householder with no spouse or partner present. 25.8% of all households were non-families. 23.2% of all households were made up of individuals, 10.7% had someone living alone who was 65 years old or older.

The median age in the city was 36.6 years. 32.2% of the residents were under the age of 20; 3.7% were between the ages of 20 and 24; 23.5% were from 25 and 44; 22.8% were from 45 and 64; and 17.8% were 65 years of age or older. The gender makeup of the city was 51.3% male and 48.7% female.

=== 2010 census ===
At the 2010 census there were 599 people, 232 households, and 165 families living in the city. The population density was 1,426.2 inhabitants per square mile (550.7/km^{2}). There were 246 housing units at an average density of 585.7 per square mile (226.1/km^{2}). The racial makeup of the city was 98.7% White, 0.2% African American, 0.2% Native American, 0.5% Asian, and 0.5% from two or more races. Hispanic or Latino of any race were 0.5%.

Of the 232 households 36.2% had children under the age of 18 living with them, 58.2% were married couples living together, 8.2% had a female householder with no husband/wife present, 4.7% had a male householder with no husband/wife present, and 28.9% were non-families. 25.0% of households were one person and 10.8% were one person aged 65 or older. The average household size was 2.58 and the average family size was 3.11.

The median age was 37.3 years. 27.4% of residents were under the age of 18; 6.6% were between the ages of 18 and 24; 27.3% were from 25 to 44; 24% were from 45 to 64; and 14.5% were 65 or older. The gender makeup of the city was 52.8% male and 47.2% female.

=== 2000 census ===
At the 2000 census there were 564 people, 222 households, and 160 families living in the city. The population density was 1,603.3 inhabitants per square mile (619.0/km^{2}). There were 236 housing units at an average density of 670.9 per square mile (259.0/km^{2}). The racial makeup of the city was 99.82% White, 0.18% from other races. Hispanic or Latino of any race were 0.53%.

Of the 222 households 34.7% had children under the age of 18 living with them, 62.2% were married couples living together, 5.9% had a female householder with no husband present, and 27.9% were non-families. 23.0% of households were one person and 13.1% were one person aged 65 or older. The average household size was 2.54 and the average family size was 2.99.

The age distribution was 27.8% under the age of 18, 6.7% from 18 to 24, 27.8% from 25 to 44, 22.7% from 45 to 64, and 14.9% 65 or older. The median age was 36 years. For every 100 females, there were 95.2 males. For every 100 females age 18 and over, there were 95.7 males.

The median household income was $42,054 and the median family income was $49,583. Males had a median income of $30,809 versus $22,813 for females. The per capita income for the city was $19,048. About 2.6% of families and 5.9% of the population were below the poverty line, including 6.4% of those under age 18 and 7.4% of those age 65 or over.

== Education ==
Tri-Center Community School District operates schools serving Minden and surrounding communities and rural areas. Its high school is Tri-Center High School, located in nearby Neola, Iowa.
