= A-H-S-T Community School District =

Former school district in Iowa, U.S.

A-H-S-T Community School District was a school district headquartered in Avoca, Iowa.

The district served sections of Harrison, Pottawattamie, and Shelby counties. It served Avoca, Hancock, Shelby, and much of Tennant.

== History ==
It was formed by the merger of the Hancock-Avoca Community School District and the Shelby Community School District on July 1, 1996.

In 2012 the A-H-S-T district and the Walnut Community School District began partial-day-sharing, in which students went to one school for some courses, as well as sharing of athletic programs. In 2014 the district began whole grade-sharing, in one school district sent its children to another school district to attend schools there all day.

Circa 2015 the middle school area of the AHSTW Secondary School building in Avoca was scheduled to receive an expansion.

The election for the school district merger was scheduled for September 8, 2015 after the Green Hills Area Education Agency approved of the merger proposal and election. The vote was approved by 94% of the voters within A-H-S-T and 77% of those in Walnut, with a combined total of 614 for and 74 against. On July 1, 2016, the A-H-S-T district merged with the Walnut district to form the AHSTW Community School District.
