= Tennant, Iowa =

- City
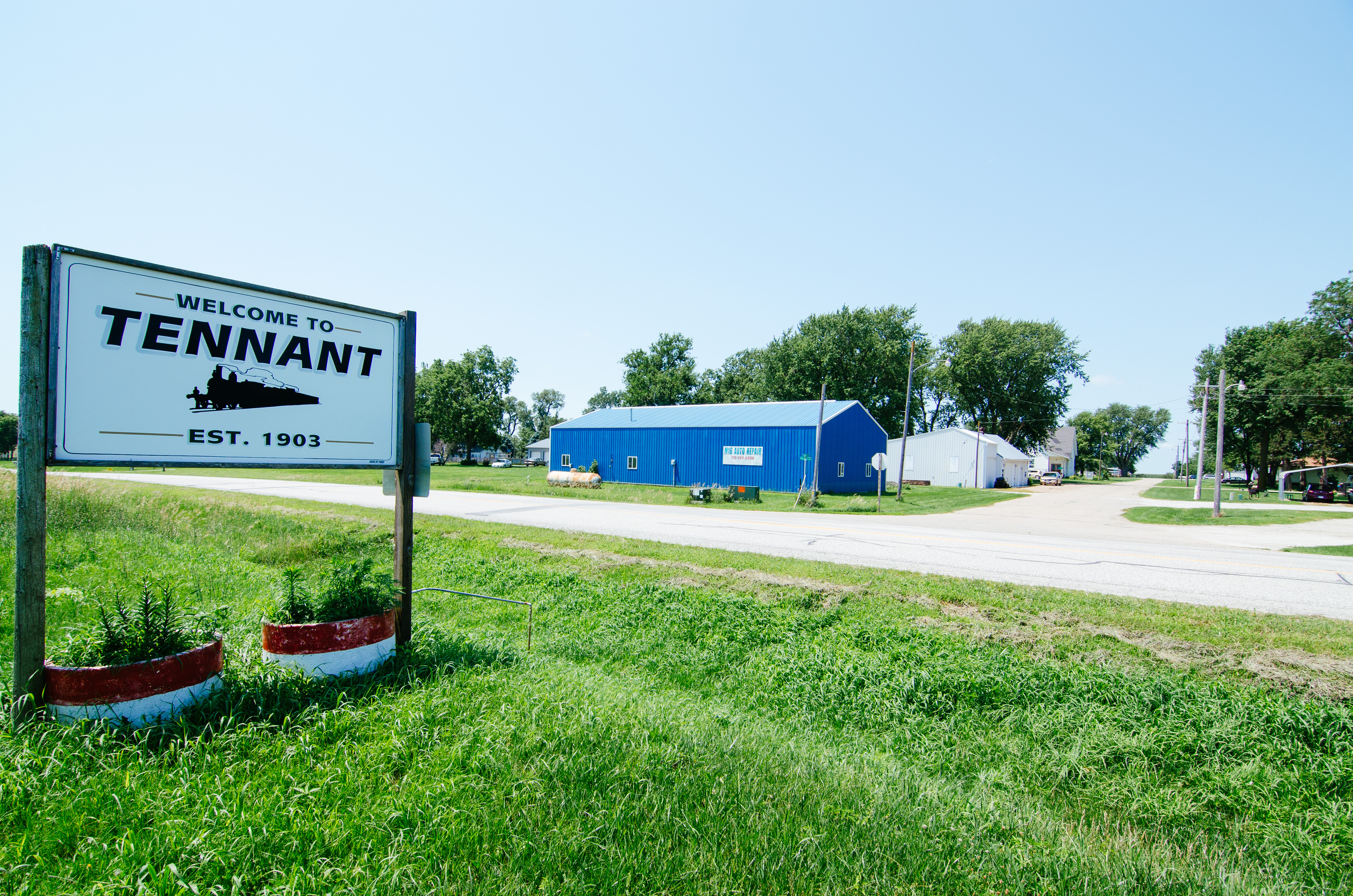
- Tennant's welcome sign when entering town

- Location of Tennant, Iowa
- Coordinates: 41°35′39″N 95°26′42″W
- Country: United States
- State: Iowa
- County: Shelby

Area
  - Total: 0.72 sq mi (1.86 km^{2})
  - Land: 0.72 sq mi (1.86 km^{2})
  - Water: 0 sq mi (0.00 km^{2})
- Elevation: 1,381 ft (421 m)

Population (2020)
  - Total: 78
  - Density: 108.8/sq mi (42.02/km^{2})
- Time zone: UTC-6 (Central (CST))
  - Summer (DST): UTC-5 (CDT)
- ZIP code: 51537
- Area code: 712
- FIPS code: 19-77430
- GNIS feature ID: 2396039

Tennant is a city in Shelby County, Iowa, United States. The population was 78 at the time of the 2020 census.

== History ==
Tennant had its start in 1903 by the building of the Chicago & Great Western Railroad through that territory.

== Geography ==
According to the United States Census Bureau, the city has a total area of 0.71 square miles (1.84 km^{2}), all of it land.

== Demographics ==
Historical populations
Year	Pop.	±%
1920	79	—
1930	118	+49.4%
1940	109	−7.6%
1950	95	−12.8%
1960	95	+0.0%
1970	93	−2.1%
1980	77	−17.2%
1990	78	+1.3%
2000	73	−6.4%
2010	68	−6.8%
2020	78	+14.7%
Source:"U.S. Census website". United States Census Bureau. and Iowa Data Center; Source: U.S. Decennial Census

=== 2020 census ===
As of the census of 2020, there were 78 people, 36 households, and 27 families residing in the city. The population density was 108.8 inhabitants per square mile (42.0/km^{2}). There were 36 housing units at an average density of 50.2 per square mile (19.4/km^{2}). The racial makeup of the city was 96.2% White, 0.0% Black or African American, 0.0% Native American, 0.0% Asian, 0.0% Pacific Islander, 1.3% from other races and 2.6% from two or more races. Hispanic or Latino persons of any race comprised 3.8% of the population.

Of the 36 households, 25.0% of which had children under the age of 18 living with them, 52.8% were married couples living together, 8.3% were cohabitating couples, 13.9% had a female householder with no spouse or partner present and 25.0% had a male householder with no spouse or partner present. 25.0% of all households were non-families. 13.9% of all households were made up of individuals, 2.8% had someone living alone who was 65 years old or older.

The median age in the city was 52.0 years. 24.4% of the residents were under the age of 20; 2.6% were between the ages of 20 and 24; 14.1% were from 25 and 44; 32.1% were from 45 and 64; and 26.9% were 65 years of age or older. The gender makeup of the city was 53.8% male and 46.2% female.

=== 2010 census ===
As of the census of 2010, there were 68 people, 33 households, and 23 families residing in the city. The population density was 95.8 inhabitants per square mile (37.0/km^{2}). There were 36 housing units at an average density of 50.7 per square mile (19.6/km^{2}). The racial makeup of the city was 100.0% White.

There were 33 households, of which 15.2% had children under the age of 18 living with them, 66.7% were married couples living together, 3.0% had a male householder with no wife present, and 30.3% were non-families. 30.3% of all households were made up of individuals, and 18.2% had someone living alone who was 65 years of age or older. The average household size was 2.06 and the average family size was 2.52.

The median age in the city was 52.8 years. 16.2% of residents were under the age of 18; 4.4% were between the ages of 18 and 24; 13.2% were from 25 to 44; 36.9% were from 45 to 64; and 29.4% were 65 years of age or older. The gender makeup of the city was 54.4% male and 45.6% female.

=== 2000 census ===
As of the census of 2000, there were 78 people, 34 households, and 24 families residing in the city. The population density was 102.3 inhabitants per square mile (39.5/km^{2}). There were 32 housing units at an average density of 44.8 per square mile (17.3/km^{2}). The racial makeup of the city was 100.00% White.

There were 32 households, out of which 15.6% had children under the age of 18 living with them, 68.8% were married couples living together, 3.1% had a female householder with no husband present, and 25.0% were non-families. 21.9% of all households were made up of individuals, and 6.3% had someone living alone who was 65 years of age or older. The average household size was 2.28 and the average family size was 2.67.

Age spread: 13.7% under the age of 18, 4.1% from 18 to 24, 26.0% from 25 to 44, 26.0% from 45 to 64, and 30.1% who were 65 years of age or older. The median age was 48 years. For every 100 females, there are 87.2 males. For every 100 females age 18 and over, there were 96.9 males.

The median income for a household in the city was $32,321, and the median income for a family was $40,417. Males had a median income of $30,938, females $21,250.. The per capita income for the city was $18,982. 1.7% of the population is below the poverty line, but no families are below the poverty line. Out of the total population, none are under the age of 18 or of those 65 and older were living below the poverty line.

== Government ==
The town's government is based on the mayor-council system. Jim Brantner was elected mayor in 2015 and has held the position since. Prior to his role as Mayor he held the role of Treasurer and City Clerk from 2007-2015. Council meetings are held on the second Tuesday of each month.

== Education ==
Most of the municipal limits is served by the AHSTW Community School District. It was previously in the A-H-S-T Community School District. On July 1, 2016, that district merged into AHSTW.
