= Victor Munden =

English cricketer

- Munden in 1951

Personal information
- Full name: Victor Stanislaus Munden
- Born: 2 January 1928; Leicester, Leicestershire
- Died: 25 September 2016 (aged 88); Louth, Lincolnshire
- Batting: Left-handed
- Bowling: Left-arm orthodox spin
- Role: All-rounder
- Relatives: Donald Munden (brother); Paul Munden (brother)

Domestic team information
- Years: Team
- 1946–1957: Leicestershire
- First-class debut: 3 August 1946 Leicestershire v Northamptonshire
- Last First-class: 26 July 1957 Leicestershire v Worcestershire

Career statistics
Competition	First-class
Matches	232
Runs scored	5,786
Batting average	17.37
100s/50s	2/21
Top score	103
Balls bowled	27,622
Wickets	371
Bowling average	28.57
5 wickets in innings	14
10 wickets in match	1
Best bowling	6/33
Catches/stumpings	82/–
- Source: CricketArchive, 31 December 2013

Victor Stanislaus Munden (2 January 1928 – 25 September 2016) was an English cricketer who played first-class cricket for Leicestershire between 1946 and 1957. He was a left-handed middle-order batsman and a left-arm orthodox spin bowler. He was born at Leicester.

Munden's younger brothers, Donald and Paul Munden, also played first-class cricket for Leicestershire and his son, David, played for the county's second eleven.

== Cricket career ==
Munden made his first-class cricket debut in a few matches in the 1946 season, batting low in the Leicestershire order and not bowling a lot: as a left-arm spin bowler, his opportunities in an attack dominated by another left-arm spinner, Jack Walsh, were limited. Towards the end of the 1948 season he played fairly regularly for the first team and in a match against Derbyshire, bowling in tandem with Walsh, he took five wickets for 48 runs. Even so, he took only 12 wickets in 10 matches, and in the following season, when he played 19 first-team games and his batting developed a little, there were only eight wickets in the whole season. He played very little in the 1950 season.

Walsh was injured and out of form for much of the 1951 season and with vacancies too in the batting line-up Munden was finally able to establish himself as a regular player in the Leicestershire side, contributing 890 runs mainly from the lower middle order and 51 wickets. His best game was an unexpectedly easy two-day victory over Surrey in which he made his highest score of the season, 73, and had his best bowling return with five wickets for 30 runs.

After this initial season of success Munden was an ever-present in the Leicestershire team for the next five years and in 1952 he had his best season with the bat, making 1259 runs at an average of 29.97, the only time that he exceeded 1000 runs in a season in his cricket career. The batting success included the only two centuries that he made in first-class cricket. Against Kent in mid-July he scored 103 with two sixes and 15 fours. A week later, he followed that with 100 in the game against Lancashire, the first time Leicestershire had beaten Lancashire since 1926.

Munden did not sustain this batting form, however, and his highest score after 1952 was just 64, although he still on occasion contributed useful runs from the lower order. Instead, his bowling became more important. In a match in 1953 on the pitch at Bath where Bertie Buse's benefit match had ended in a single day just a week earlier he achieved both the best innings and match figures of his career, taking six for 33 in the second Somerset innings to follow four wickets for nine runs in the first innings: the figures of 10 for 42 were the only time he took 10 wickets in a match. By 1955, when he took 87 wickets in the season, he had supplanted the ageing Walsh as Leicestershire's main left-arm spin bowler. In this season, he was picked for end-of-season representative matches in the Scarborough cricket festival, including an appearance in the Players team where he was successful as a batsman.

In 1956, however, Munden's bowling form "fell away badly" and he was replaced as the left-arm spinner in a few matches by Ray Smith. He finished with just 29 wickets in the season from 26 matches, though there was a second Gentlemen v Players appearance at Scarborough. His form did not recover in the following year and at the end of the 1957 season he was not re-engaged by Leicestershire. He did not play in first-class cricket again, although he made occasional appearances in second eleven cricket for Leicestershire through to the mid-1960s. He died at the age of 88 in 2016.
