= Mundane (disambiguation) =

Mundane is a science fiction subculture term.

Mundane may also refer to:

- Carri Mundane, English fashion designer
- Journal of Mundane Behavior, a sociological journal devoted to everyday experience.
- Mundane astrology, the application of astrology to world affairs and world events
- Mundane Egg, a creation myth in various ancient cultures
- Mundane reason, a philosophical concept
- Mundane science fiction, a subgenre of science fiction
