= Paul Munden =

English cricketer

Personal information
- Full name: Paul Anthony Munden
- Born: 5 November 1938; Barrow upon Soar, Leicestershire
- Died: April 2018 (aged 79)
- Batting: Left-handed
- Role: Batsman
- Relatives: Donald Munden (brother); Victor Munden (brother)

Domestic team information
- Years: Team
- 1957–1964: Leicestershire
- First-class debut: 19 June 1957 Leicestershire v Oxford University
- Last First-class: 3 August 1964 Leicestershire v Worcestershire
- Only List A: 27 May 1964 Leicestershire v Northamptonshire

Career statistics
Competition	First-class	List A
Matches	47	1
Runs scored	1193	15
Batting average	15.10	15.00
100s/50s	0/5	0/0
Top score	77	15
Catches/stumpings	17/–	0/–
- Source: CricketArchive, 1 January 2014

Paul Anthony Munden (5 November 1938 – April 2018) was an English cricketer who played first-class and List A cricket for Leicestershire between 1957 and 1964. He was a left-handed middle-order batsman. He was born at Barrow upon Soar in Leicestershire.

His brothers, Vic and Donald, also played first-class cricket for Leicestershire.

== Cricket career ==
Ten years younger than his brother Vic, who played regularly for Leicestershire between 1946 and 1957, Paul Munden's first-class career overlapped with Vic's by only a single game, the match against Oxford University in which he made his debut in June 1957. When Paul Munden returned to the Leicestershire first team later in the season it was as a direct replacement for Vic, who had played in the previous match and who did not play any further first-team cricket thereafter. Paul Munden's first-class cricket overlapped with the shorter first-class career of his other brother, Donald Munden, and they played alongside each other as middle order batsmen in two matches in the 1961 season.

Paul Munden himself had an irregular first-class career and never appeared in more than 11 matches in a season. He passed 50 in five innings, but his highest score was only 77, made in 1963 against Sussex, and in no season did his batting average rise above 20 runs per innings. In 1964 he had a particularly poor batting season and though he appeared in his only List A match that year it was his last season in senior cricket. He continued to play intermittently for Leicestershire's second eleven through to 1976.

Munden died in April 2018, at the age of 79.
