= Donald Munden =

English cricketer

Personal information
- Full name: Donald Francis Xavier Munden
- Born: 17 October 1934 (age 92); Leicester, Leicestershire, England
- Batting: Right-handed
- Bowling: Leg break
- Relatives: Paul Munden (brother); Victor Munden (brother)

Domestic team information
- Years: Team
- 1960–1961: Leicestershire

Career statistics
Competition	First-class
Matches	7
Runs scored	98
Batting average	7.33
100s/50s	–/–
Top score	34
Balls bowled	12
Wickets	–
Bowling average	–
5 wickets in innings	–
10 wickets in match	–
Best bowling	–
Catches/stumpings	2/–
- Source: Cricinfo, 20 June 2012

Donald Francis Xavier Munden (born 17 October 1934) is a former English cricketer. Munden was a right-handed batsman who bowled leg break. He was born at Leicester, Leicestershire.

Munden made his first-class debut for Leicestershire against Essex in the 1960 County Championship at Coventry Road, Hinckley. He made six further first-class appearances for the county, the last of which came against Surrey in the 1961 County Championship at The Oval. In his seven matches for Leicestershire, he scored 98 runs at an average of 7.53, with a high score of 34.

His brothers, Paul and Victor, both played first-class cricket.
