= Shelby, Iowa =

- City
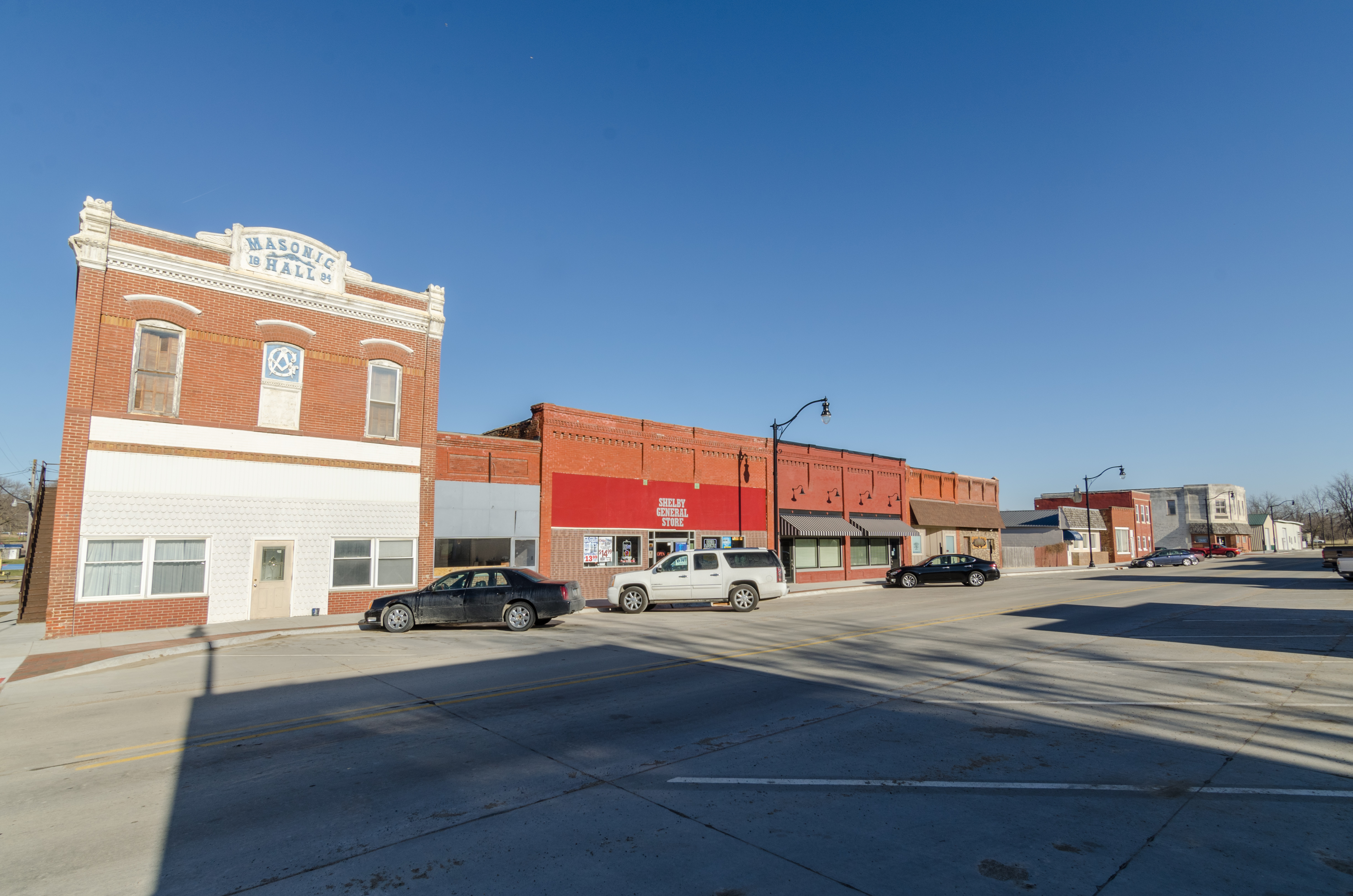
- Downtown Shelby, Iowa

- Location of Shelby, Iowa
- Coordinates: 41°30′05″N 95°26′50″W
- Country: USA
- State: Iowa
- Counties: Shelby, Pottawattamie

Area
  - Total: 1.87 sq mi (4.85 km^{2})
  - Land: 1.87 sq mi (4.85 km^{2})
  - Water: 0 sq mi (0.00 km^{2})
- Elevation: 1,345 ft (410 m)

Population (2020)
  - Total: 727
  - Density: 387.9/sq mi (149.78/km^{2})
- Time zone: UTC-6 (Central (CST))
  - Summer (DST): UTC-5 (CDT)
- ZIP code: 51570
- Area code: 712
- FIPS code: 19-72300
- GNIS feature ID: 2395863
- Website: City of Shelby

Shelby is a city in Pottawattamie and Shelby counties in the U.S. state of Iowa. The population was 727 at the time of the 2020 census.

== History ==
Shelby started in the late 1860s, following the construction of the railroad through the territory.

Shelby was platted in 1870 by Benjamin F. Allen and Thusie Allen and was incorporated in 1877.

The Chicago, Rock Island, and Pacific Railroad Stone Arch Viaduct, north-east of Shelby, is listed on the National Register of Historic Places.

== Geography ==
According to the United States Census Bureau, the city has a total area of 1.74 square miles (4.51 km^{2}), all land.

== Demographics ==
Historical populations
Year	Pop.	±%
1880	449	—
1890	582	+29.6%
1900	692	+18.9%
1910	586	−15.3%
1920	588	+0.3%
1930	617	+4.9%
1940	627	+1.6%
1950	592	−5.6%
1960	533	−10.0%
1970	537	+0.8%
1980	665	+23.8%
1990	637	−4.2%
2000	696	+9.3%
2010	641	−7.9%
2020	727	+13.4%
Source:"U.S. Census website". United States Census Bureau. and Iowa Data Center; Source: U.S. Decennial Census

=== 2020 census ===
As of the census of 2020, there were 727 people, 296 households, and 170 families residing in the city. The population density was 387.9 inhabitants per square mile (149.8/km^{2}). There were 328 housing units at an average density of 175.0 per square mile (67.6/km^{2}). The racial makeup of the city was 93.0% White, 0.6% Black or African American, 0.6% Native American, 0.1% Asian, 0.0% Pacific Islander, 0.6% from other races and 5.2% from two or more races. Hispanic or Latino persons of any race comprised 4.3% of the population.

Of the 296 households, 28.7% of which had children under the age of 18 living with them, 42.2% were married couples living together, 9.8% were cohabitating couples, 25.7% had a female householder with no spouse or partner present and 22.3% had a male householder with no spouse or partner present. 42.6% of all households were non-families. 32.4% of all households were made up of individuals, 14.2% had someone living alone who was 65 years old or older.

The median age in the city was 35.4 years. 27.0% of the residents were under the age of 20; 5.0% were between the ages of 20 and 24; 27.4% were from 25 and 44; 23.5% were from 45 and 64; and 17.2% were 65 years of age or older. The gender makeup of the city was 48.7% male and 51.3% female.

=== 2010 census ===
As of the census of 2010, there were 641 people, 263 households, and 171 families living in the city. The population density was 368.4 inhabitants per square mile (142.2/km^{2}). There were 302 housing units at an average density of 173.6 per square mile (67.0/km^{2}). The racial makeup of the city was 98.6% White, 0.2% African American, 0.2% Native American, 0.2% Asian, and 0.9% from two or more races. Hispanic or Latino of any race were 0.9% of the population.

There were 263 households, of which 29.7% had children under the age of 18 living with them, 46.8% were married couples living together, 13.7% had a female householder with no husband present, 4.6% had a male householder with no wife present, and 35.0% were non-families. 27.4% of all households were made up of individuals, and 9.5% had someone living alone who was 65 years of age or older. The average household size was 2.38 and the average family size was 2.86.

The median age in the city was 40.8 years. 22.6% of residents were under the age of 18; 8.6% were between the ages of 18 and 24; 24.7% were from 25 to 44; 29.1% were from 45 to 64; and 15% were 65 years of age or older. The gender makeup of the city was 48.0% male and 52.0% female.

=== 2000 census ===
As of the census of 2000, there were 696 people, 268 households, and 173 families living in the city. The population density was 425.2 inhabitants per square mile (164.2/km^{2}). There were 286 housing units at an average density of 174.7 per square mile (67.5/km^{2}). The racial makeup of the city was 98.85% White, 0.43% Native American, and 0.72% from two or more races. Hispanic or Latino of any race were 1.01% of the population.

There were 268 households, out of which 31.3% had children under the age of 18 living with them, 53.7% were married couples living together, 8.6% had a female householder with no husband present, and 35.1% were non-families. 30.2% of all households were made up of individuals, and 15.7% had someone living alone who was 65 years of age or older. The average household size was 2.40 and the average family size was 3.03.

Age spread: 26.9% under the age of 18, 6.6% from 18 to 24, 28.9% from 25 to 44, 23.0% from 45 to 64, and 14.7% who were 65 years of age or older. The median age was 37 years. For every 100 females, there were 96.6 males. For every 100 females age 18 and over, there were 91.4 males.

The median income for a household in the city was $31,250, and the median income for a family was $40,000. Males had a median income of $28,393 versus $20,909 for females. The per capita income for the city was $14,720. About 3.9% of families and 13.0% of the population were below the poverty line, including 8.0% of those under age 18 and 3.9% of those age 65 or over.

== Time capsule ==
The city had a time capsule that was sealed on July 16, 1970, as part of Shelby's centennial celebration. Shelby's "Centennial Time Capsule" was opened on Friday, June 25, 2021. It was scheduled to open on July 16, 2020, but was delayed due the COVID-19 pandemic. It was located in Shelby Park near the intersection of Center Street and West Street.

== Education ==
The community is served by the AHSTW Community School District. It was in the Shelby Community School District until July 1, 1996, when that district merged into the A-H-S-T Community School District. That one in turn merged into AHSTW on July 1, 2016.

== See also ==
- List of timelines for time capsule install and open dates.
