= Judah Löb Minden =

Judah Löb ben Joel Minden (Hebrew: יהודא ליב בן יואל מינדן, romanized: Yehuda Leyb ben Yo'el Minden) was an 18th-century German Jewish lexicographer.

In 1760, with the approval of the rabbinates of Berlin and Halberstadt, he published Millim le-eloah, the first Hebrew-German dictionary produced by a Jew. Inspired by David Kimḥi's Sefer ha-shorashim, the work also contained discussions of the grammatical functions of the letters. In 1765 Minden published a new edition of Benjamin Musaphia's Zekher rav as a supplement to his own work.
