= Minden Township, Pottawattamie County, Iowa =

Township in Pottawattamie County, Iowa, U.S.

Coordinates: 41.4547°N 95.5744°W

Minden Township is a township in Pottawattamie County, Iowa, United States.

== History ==
Minden Township takes its name from Minden, in Germany.
