= Western Iowa Conference =

Iowa High School athletic conference

- Conference: IHSAA / IGHSAU
- Founded: 1972
- Sports fielded: 13; men's: 7; women's: 6
- Division: 1A and 2A
- No. of teams: 9
- Region: Western Iowa
- Website: www.westerniowaconference.org

The Western Iowa Conference is a high school athletic conference made up of smaller 1A and bigger 2A schools located mostly in the greater Council Bluffs area. The teams in the conference have a deep-rooted history together. Most of the schools have been with the conference throughout its history.

== History ==
The Western Iowa Conference was organized in 1972 through the merger of the former Tri-County and Southwest Iowa Conferences. Members of the Tri-County Conference at that time were Carson–Macedonia, Elk Horn–Kimballton, Iowa School for the Deaf, Shelby-Tennant, Treynor, Tri-Center (Neola), Underwood, and Walnut. The members of the Southwest Iowa Conference then were AvoHa (Avoca), Griswold, Missouri Valley, and Oakland. Competition in the new 12-team conference began in the summer of 1971 with baseball and softball tournaments. No regular season schedules were played during the 1971–72 school year, but girls and boys basketball tournaments and the traditional wrestling tournament were held in early 1972.

Many changes have occurred since then to turn today’s WIC into a nine-team league. It remained a 12-team conference until after the 1981–82 school year. At that time Elk Horn–Kimballton and Walnut dropped out to join the Rolling Hills Conference. Following the 1982–83 school year, Iowa Deaf dropped out making the WIC a 9-team conference. After the 1985–86 school year, Carson–Macedonia dropped out, but would eventually join with Oakland to form Riverside. Then following the 1987–88 school year Shelby-Tennant left the league, but it would join forces with AvoHa a few years later to form what is now known as AHST. Finally, for the 1990–91 school year, Audubon joined the WIC to form an eight-team league.

The league saw a change in membership for the first time in over two decades when Logan–Magnolia and IKM–Manning joined from the Western Valley Activities Conference for the 2013–14 season. Griswold left in 2018-19 for the Corner Conference (Iowa).

On February 13, 2025, the Missouri Valley Community School District announced it would be entering a collaborative agreement with the West Harrison Community School District for all athletics in grades 7-12. The teams are to compete under the Missouri Valley Big Reds name and colors. West Harrison formerly competed in the Rolling Valley Conference.

In 2025, Audubon accepted an invitation to join the Rolling Valley Conference, starting with the 2027-2028 school year. Additionally, Red Oak and Shenandoah, longtime members of the Hawkeye Ten Conference, were considering invitations to move to the WIC, with decisions expected in the summer of 2025, while officials with the IKM-Manning School District were also expected to decide whether to move from the WIC to the Rolling Valley Conference.

On June 23, 2025, IKM-Manning voted to leave the Western Iowa Conference and join the Rolling Valley Conference, following Audubon.

On August 19, 2025, Shenandoah Community School District announced it would be leaving the Hawkeye 10 Conference for the Western Iowa Conference for the 2026-2027 school year.

On August 21, 2025, Red Oak Community School District announced it would also be leaving the Hawkeye 10 Conference for the Western Iowa Conference for the 2026-2027 school year.

On August 26, 2025, Treynor declined an invitation from the Hawkeye 10 to join, confirming they would stay in the Western Iowa Conference for the time being.

== List of member schools ==
School	Location	Affiliation	Mascot	Colors	2026-2027 BEDS
AHSTW	Avoca	Public	Vikings & Lady Vikes		154
Logan–Magnolia	Logan	Public	Panthers		160
Missouri Valley	Missouri Valley	Public	Big Reds & Lady Reds		153
Red Oak	Red Oak	Public	Tigers		199
Riverside	Oakland	Public	Bulldogs		165
Shenandoah	Shenandoah	Public	Mustangs & Fillies		214
Treynor	Treynor	Public	Cardinals		217
Tri-Center	Neola	Public	Trojans		152
Underwood	Underwood	Public	Eagles		181
