= Missouri Valley High School =

Public secondary school in Missouri Valley, Iowa, United States

Location
- 605 E Lincoln Highway; Missouri Valley, Iowa 51555
- Coordinates: 41.563°N 95.880°W

Information
- Type: Public secondary
- Mottoes: Built on Pride, Destined for Greatness
- School district: Missouri Valley Community School District
- Principal: Nate McDonald
- Teaching staff: 21.63 (FTE)
- Grades: 9-12
- Enrollment: 236 (2023-2024)
- Student to teacher ratio: 10.91
- Campus type: Rural
- Color(s): Red and White
- Teams: Big Reds
- Yearbook: Title Varies
- Affiliation: Western Iowa Conference
- Website: www.movalleyschools.org

Missouri Valley High School is a public, co-educational high school of Missouri Valley Community School District, and serves grades nine through twelve. Missouri Valley High School is in Missouri Valley, Iowa. Missouri Valley's mascot is the Big Reds, and the school uses the colors red and white. The mascot most recently used has been an arrowhead, but was under debate in past years. It was established in 1976.

== Academics ==
Missouri Valley High School has about a 15:1 student / teacher ratio. There are about 300 students enrolled in Missouri Valley High. Missouri Valley High's students took the Iowa Tests for Educational Development (ITED). In 2006, the 11th graders had 79% at or above proficient in reading, the state average being 88%. Other scores showed 76% proficiency in math, with a state average of 78%. Students that score above 40% are considered proficient on this standardized test, which is used to compare Missouri Valley students to their national classmates.

== In-school organizations, clubs, extracurricular activities, and athletics ==
=== Organizations ===
- Key Club International (Nebraska-Iowa District)
- HOSA
- FBLA
- FFA
- FCCLA

=== Missouri Valley High School Clubs ===
- Pep Club
- Math Club
- Thespians
- Art Club
- Science Club

=== Extracurricular Activities ===
- Band
- Choir
- Drama
- Speech

=== Athletics ===
The Big/Lady Reds compete in the Western Iowa Conference. Missouri Valley High offers many athletics a student can be involved in. Some include Cheerleading, Dance Team, volleyball, American football, girls and boys cross country, girls and boys basketball, wrestling, girls and boys track & field, soccer, girls and boys golf, baseball, and softball .

- 1987 Girls' Cross Country Class 2A/1A State Champions
- 2021 Cross Country WIC Champion

==== Fight song ====
Missouri Valley High's fight song is the same as the Northwestern fight song, Go U Northwestern, with some minor changes.

Go ye Mo. Valley, fight for victory,
With our banners waving, we will cheer you one, two, three
fight fight fight
Go ye Mo. Valley, fight for victory
fight for the fame of our great name,
Go Mo. Valley, win this game.
Go you Big Reds! Fight fight fight!

== See also ==
- List of high schools in Iowa
