= Eva Fipps =

American politician (born 2005)

Mayor of Henderson, Iowa
- Incumbent
- Assumed office January 1, 2026
- Preceded by: Joel Tomford

Personal details
- Born: 2005 (age 20–21)

Eva Fipps (born 2005) is an American politician who became the youngest woman mayor in American history after being elected the mayor of Henderson, Iowa in 2025, at age 20.

== Biography ==
Eva Fipps was born in 2005. She graduated from Treynor High School, where she was dually enrolled in Iowa Western Community College. She was a member of Iowa Girls State and was a page in the Iowa General Assembly.

As a college student, the city clerk, Candace Knop, suggested Fipps run for mayor. On November 4, 2025, she was elected with 62% of the vote, and was sworn in on January 1, 2025. She may be the youngest woman mayor in American history and the youngest incumbent mayor in the country.

As mayor, Fipps's priorities include filling storefronts and renovating the community's playground.

== Electoral history ==
2025 Henderson, Iowa mayoral election
Candidate	Votes	%
Eva Fipps	31	62%
Scott Schondelmeyer	19	38%

== See also ==
- Jaylen Smith; mayor of Earle, Arkansas, who became the youngest Black mayor in American history at age 18 in 2023.
