= Hawkeye 10 Conference =

High school athletic conference in Iowa

- Formerly: Little 6, Hawkeye 6-7-8
- Conference: IHSAA / IGHSAU
- Founded: February 15, 1930
- No. of teams: 9
- Region: Southwest Iowa
- Website: www.hawkeyeten.org

The Hawkeye 10 Conference is a high school athletic conference in Iowa made up of larger-mid-size schools in Southwest Iowa. Most members participate at the 3A level in all sports, which is the second highest level of competition in Iowa.

== List of member schools ==
| School | Location | Affiliation | Mascot | Colors | Year Joined | BEDS Enrollment (2026–2027) | Football Class 2025–26 |
|---|---|---|---|---|---|---|---|
| Atlantic | Atlantic | Public | Trojans | | 1930 | 324 | 3A |
| Carroll | Carroll | Public | Tigers | | 2026 | 349 | 3A |
| Clarinda | Clarinda | Public | Cardinals | | 1930 | 261 | 2A |
| Creston | Creston | Public | Panthers | | 1930 | 328 | 3A |
| Denison-Schleswig | Denison | Public | Monarchs | | 1993 | 568 | 4A |
| Glenwood | Glenwood | Public | Rams | | 1951 | 426 | 4A |
| Harlan | Harlan | Public | Cyclones | | 1971 | 325 | 3A |
| Kuemper Catholic | Carroll | Private | Knights | | 1993 | 229 | 2A |
| St. Albert Catholic* | Council Bluffs | Private | Falcons & Saintes | | 2013 | 139 | A |

*Heartland Christian School, located in Council Bluffs, co-ops with St. Albert Catholic for baseball, football, cheer, and softball. Heartland Christian competes in other sports in the Frontier Conference of Nebraska.

=== Former member schools ===
| School | Location | Affiliation | Mascot | Colors | Year Joined | Year Left | Conference Left For |
|---|---|---|---|---|---|---|---|
| Villisca | Villisca | Public | Blue Jays | | 1930 (founding member) | 1962 | Tall Corn (founding member) |
| Corning | Corning | Public | Red Raiders | | 1946 | 1970 | Tall Corn |
| Lewis Central | Council Bluffs | Public | Titans | | 1970 | 2026 | Missouri River Conference |
| Red Oak | Red Oak | Public | Tigers | | 1930 (founding member) | 2026 | Western Iowa Conference |
| Shenandoah | Shenandoah | Public | Mustangs & Fillies | | 1930 (founding member) | 2026 | Western Iowa Conference |

In 2013, Corning and Villisca entered a joint operation agreement and are known as the Southwest Valley Timberwolves, competing in the Pride of Iowa Conference.

*Classifications for football are set for two-year cycles with enrollment numbers from grades 9-11 from the school year before the cycle begins. For all other sports, enrollment numbers from grades 10-12 are used to determine classes for the current school year.

== Conference History ==
In 1930, Creston approached Little Ten Conference members Atlantic, Clarinda, Red Oak, Shenandoah, and Villisca about breaking away from the conference to create their own league. The conference at the time consisted of those schools plus Bedford, Corning, Glenwood, and Sidney. During a meeting in Villisca on February 15, 1930, the schools decided to make it official. Soon after, The Little Six named was changed to the Hawkeye Six.

The 1930 track meet at Red Oak was the first official event, with Shenandoah claiming the first title in league history. Creston and Red Oak would tie for the football conference championship in the fall of '30.

In 1946 the conference went through their first phase of expansion when Corning was admitted, making the conference the Hawkeye Seven. Glenwood would follow in 1951, making it the Hawkeye Eight.

In 1962, Villisca withdrew from the conference to found the Tall Corn Conference, and Council Bluffs, Abraham Lincoln applied for membership, but was denied. Harlan would be invited at this time, but turned down an invitation to stay in the Midwest Conference.

In the fall of 1963, Lewis Central applied for membership, but was denied. The same happened in 1966 when St. Albert's Catholic and Maryville, Missouri both applied for membership and were denied.

Moving forward to 1968, Corning announced they would be leaving the conference in 1970 for the Tall Corn Conference as well. Lewis Central was soon admitted in 1970, and Harlan the following year.

The conference was known as the Hawkeye Eight until 1993 when Kuemper Catholic and Denison, recently partnered with Schelswig, joined. Beginning in the fall of 2013, St. Albert's Catholic finally became a member school as well, giving the conference 11 schools.

In 2017, the Missouri River Conference sent letters inviting both Lewis Central and Glenwood to join. Both schools declined.

=== 2025 realignment ===
After St. Albert joined, Hawkeye 10 membership remained stable until 2025, when – as part of a wave of conference realignments across Iowa – multiple announcements were made for current members departing to join other leagues, primarily for competitive reasons. This process started in June, when Lewis Central accepted an invitation to join the Missouri River Activities Conference, or MRAC. (At that same time, three other Hawkeye 10 schools – Denison-Schleswig, Glenwood and Harlan – were also offered membership to the MRAC, but each of those schools declined.) In August, Shenandoah and Red Oak each announced they had accepted invitations to join the Western Iowa Conference. The new conference affiliations for each of the schools were to become effective for the 2026–2027 school year.

The announced departures of Lewis Central, Red Oak and Shenandoah temporarily left the Hawkeye 10 with eight schools, and membership was on course to stay that way when longtime Western Iowa Conference member Treynor, which had been offered an invitation to join the Hawkeye 10, decided to remain in their current conference. Then in September, the Carroll Community School Board unanimously voted to accept an invitation for Carroll, a member of the Raccoon River Conference, to join the Hawkeye 10 conference effective the 2026–2027 school year. Upon Carroll joining, the Hawkeye 10's new membership will become nine schools.

== Success ==
While the conference no longer sponsors football due to Iowa's district system, Harlan Community is one of the most storied football programs in the nation, having won 14 class 3A state titles since Iowa began the football playoff system in 1972. Harlan claimed titles in 1972, 1982, 1983, 1984, 1993, 1995, 1997, 1998, 2003, 2004, 2005, 2009, 2021, and 2022. Harlan holds the longest regular-season game winning streak (excludes post-season games) in Iowa high school football history, winning 66 straight games from 1985 to 1992. In addition, legendary coach Curt Bladt is the second winningest coach in state history, posting an unheard of 407–60 record in his career. Coach Bladt trails the all-time leader Dick Tighe by just 25 games despite the fact that Tighe coached for 63 years and Bladt has only coached for 40. Bladt has earned the honor of National High School Coach of the Year by the National High School Athletic Association, twice, and is also immortalized in a book titled Let the Chips Fall Where They May. Thanks to state titles held in Men's Basketball, Wrestling, and Baseball in recent years Harlan was also one of the finalist for ESPN's top High School Sport town in recent years.

=== State Champions ===
| Year | School | Sport | Class |
|---|---|---|---|
| 1939 | Creston | Basketball | Single Class |
| 1953 | Red Oak | Track | A |
| 1956 | Glenwood | Football | A |
| 1956 | Clarinda | Track | A |
| 1962 | Clarinda | Cross Country | A |
| 1963 | Clarinda | Cross Country | A |
| 1963 | Atlantic | Golf | A |
| 1965 | Red Oak | Cross Country | AA |
| 1966 | Red Oak | Cross Country | AA |
| 1967 | Creston | Girls Golf | A |
| 1967 | Red Oak | Cross Country | AA |
| 1967 | Glenwood | Indoor Track | A |
| 1972 | Harlan | Football | 3A |
| 1973 | Lewis Central | Cross Country | AA |
| 1973 | Red Oak | Track | A |
| 1974 | Shenandoah | Cross Country | B |
| 1975 | Shenandoah | Cross Country | A |
| 1978 | Denison-Schleswig | Basketball | 2A |
| 1982 | Harlan | Football | 3A |
| 1983 | Harlan | Football | 3A |
| 1983 | Atlantic | Girls Track | 2A |
| 1984 | Harlan | Football | 3A |
| 1985 | Atlantic | Golf | 3A |
| 1987 | Denison-Schleswig | Tennis | 1A |
| 1988 | Shenandoah | Cross Country | 2A |
| 1989 | Shenandoah | Cross Country | 2A |
| 1989 | Glenwood | Track | 3A |
| 1989 | Glenwood | Wrestling | 2A |
| 1990 | Atlantic | Girls Basketball | Single Class |
| 1990 | Glenwood | Track | 3A |
| 1991 | Shenandoah | Cross Country | 2A |
| 1993 | Harlan | Football | 3A |
| 1994 | Denison-Schleswig | Baseball | 3A |
| 1994 | Clarinda | Wrestling | 2A |
| 1995 | Harlan | Football | 3A |
| 1995 | Kuemper Catholic | Golf | 3A |
| 1996 | Harlan | Baseball | 3A |
| 1997 | Creston | Basketball | 3A |
| 1997 | Harlan | Football | 3A |
| 1998 | Kuemper Catholic | Girls Basketball | 3A |
| 1998 | Harlan | Football | 3A |
| 1998 | Atlantic | Girls Track | 2A |
| 1999 | Clarinda | Girls Golf | 2A |
| 1999 | Atlantic | Girls Track | 2A |
| 2000 | Lewis Central | Wrestling | 3A |
| 2000 | Lewis Central | Wrestling Dual Team | 3A |
| 2000 | Atlantic | Girls Track | 2A |
| 2001 | Lewis Central | Wrestling | 3A |
| 2001 | Lewis Central | Wrestling Dual Team | 3A |
| 2001 | Atlantic | Girls Track | 2A |
| 2002 | Atlantic | Football | 3A |
| 2003 | Harlan | Football | 3A |
| 2003 | Red Oak | Tennis | 1A |
| 2003 | Harlan | Track | 3A |
| 2003 | Atlantic | Girls Track | 2A |
| 2004 | Harlan | Basketball | 3A |
| 2004 | Harlan | Football | 3A |
| 2004 | Atlantic | Girls Track | 3A |
| 2004 | Lewis Central | Wrestling | 3A |
| 2005 | Kuemper Catholic | Girls Golf | 3A |
| 2005 | Harlan | Football | 3A |
| 2006 | Harlan | Basketball | 3A |
| 2006 | Kuemper Catholic | Girls Golf | 3A |
| 2007 | Red Oak | Girls Bowling | 1A |
| 2007 | Creston | Wrestling | 2A |
| 2007 | Creston | Wrestling Dual Team | 2A |
| 2009 | Harlan | Football | 3A |
| 2009 | Kuemper Catholic | Golf | 2A |
| 2010 | Glenwood | Baseball | 3A |
| 2010 | Kuemper Catholic | Golf | 2A |
| 2010 | Kuemper Catholic | Girls Golf | 2A |
| 2011 | Kuemper Catholic | Golf | 2A |
| 2011 | Glenwood | Track | 3A |
| 2013 | Creston | Golf | 3A |
| 2013 | Kuemper Catholic | Girls Golf | 3A |
| 2013 | Harlan | Volleyball | 4A |
| 2013 | Kuemper Catholic | Football | 2A |
| 2014 | Harlan | Girls Basketball | 4A |
| 2014 | Atlantic | Girls Golf | 3A |
| 2014 | Harlan | Volleyball | 4A |
| 2015 | Harlan | Girls Basketball | 4A |
| 2016 | Creston | Wrestling | 2A |
| 2018 | Kuemper Catholic | Golf | 2A |
| 2018 | Glenwood | Basketball | 3A |
| 2018 | St. Albert Catholic | Track | 1A |
| 2018 | Kuemper Catholic | Volleyball | 3A |
| 2019 | Glenwood | Girls Track | 3A |
| 2019 | Lewis Central | Soccer | 2A |
| 2021 | St. Albert Catholic | Baseball | 1A |
| 2021 | Harlan | Football | 3A |
| 2021 | Lewis Central | Football | 4A |
| 2022 | Harlan | Football | 3A |
| 2022 | Denison-Schleswig | Bowling | 2A |
| 2023 | Lewis Central | Football | 4A |
| 2024 | Creston | Wrestling Dual Team | 2A |
| 2025 | St. Albert Catholic | Girls Basketball | 1A |
| 2025 | Kuemper Catholic | Football | 2A |

=== State Team Championships Since Joining Hawkeye 10 ===
| School | Titles |
|---|---|
| Harlan | 22 |
| Kuemper Catholic | 13 |
| Atlantic | 12 |
| Lewis Central | 9 |
| Creston | 8 |
| Glenwood | 8 |
| Red Oak | 7 |
| Clarinda | 6 |
| Shenandoah | 5 |
| Denison-Schleswig | 4 |
| St. Albert Catholic | 3 |

=== Wrestling ===
There is a strong history of wrestling in the conference with four separate schools having won state team championships since Glenwood won the conference's first in 1989. Lewis Central and Creston lead the way with 5 and 4 titles, respectively.
