= Missouri Valley =

Missouri Valley may refer to:

- Missouri Valley, Iowa, a small city
- Missouri River Valley
- Missouri Valley Conference, an NCAA Division I non-football college athletic conference
- Missouri Valley Football Conference, an NCAA Division I FCS college athletic conference
- Missouri Valley Intercollegiate Athletic Association, a former college football athletic conference
- Missouri Valley College in Marshall, Missouri
