= Red Oak Community School District =

Public school in Red Oak, Iowa, United States

Coordinates: 41.022068°N 95.234800°W

Location
- Red Oak, Iowa Montgomery, Page and Pottawattamie counties United States
- Coordinates: 41.022068, -95.234800

District information
- Type: Local school district
- Grades: K-12
- Superintendent: Ron Lorenz
- Schools: 3
- Budget: $17,711,000 (2020-21)
- NCES District ID: 1924000

Students and staff
- Students: 1044 (2022-23)
- Teachers: 70.86 FTE
- Staff: 54.40 FTE
- Student–teacher ratio: 14.73
- Athletic conference: Western Iowa Conference
- District mascot: Tigers
- Colors: Orange and Black

Other information
- Website: www.redoakschooldistrict.com

The Red Oak Community School District is a rural public school district based in Red Oak, Iowa. The district is mainly in Montgomery County, with small areas in Page and Pottawattamie counties. The district serves the towns of Red Oak and Coburg, and surrounding rural areas.

The school's mascot is the Tigers. Their colors are orange and black.

== Schools ==
The district operates three schools, all in Red Oak:

- Red Oak Early Childhood Center
- Inman Elementary School
- Red Oak Junior/Senior High School

== Red Oak High School ==
=== Athletics ===
The Tigers compete in the Hawkeye 10 Conference in the following sports:

==== Fall Sports ====
- Football
- Cross Country (boys and girls)
  - Boys' - 3-time State Champions (1965, 1966, 1967)
- Volleyball

==== Winter Sports ====
- Basketball (boys and girls)
- Bowling
  - Girls' 2007 State Champions
  - Boys' 2019 Class 1A State Champions
- Wrestling

==== Spring Sports ====
- Golf (boys and girls)
- Soccer (boys and girls)
- Tennis (boys and girls)
  - Boys' - 2003 State Champions
- Track and Field (boys and girls)
  - Boys' 2-time State Champions (1953, 1973)

==== Summer Sports ====
- Baseball
- Softball

== See also ==
- List of school districts in Iowa
- List of high schools in Iowa
