= Henderson, Iowa =

- City
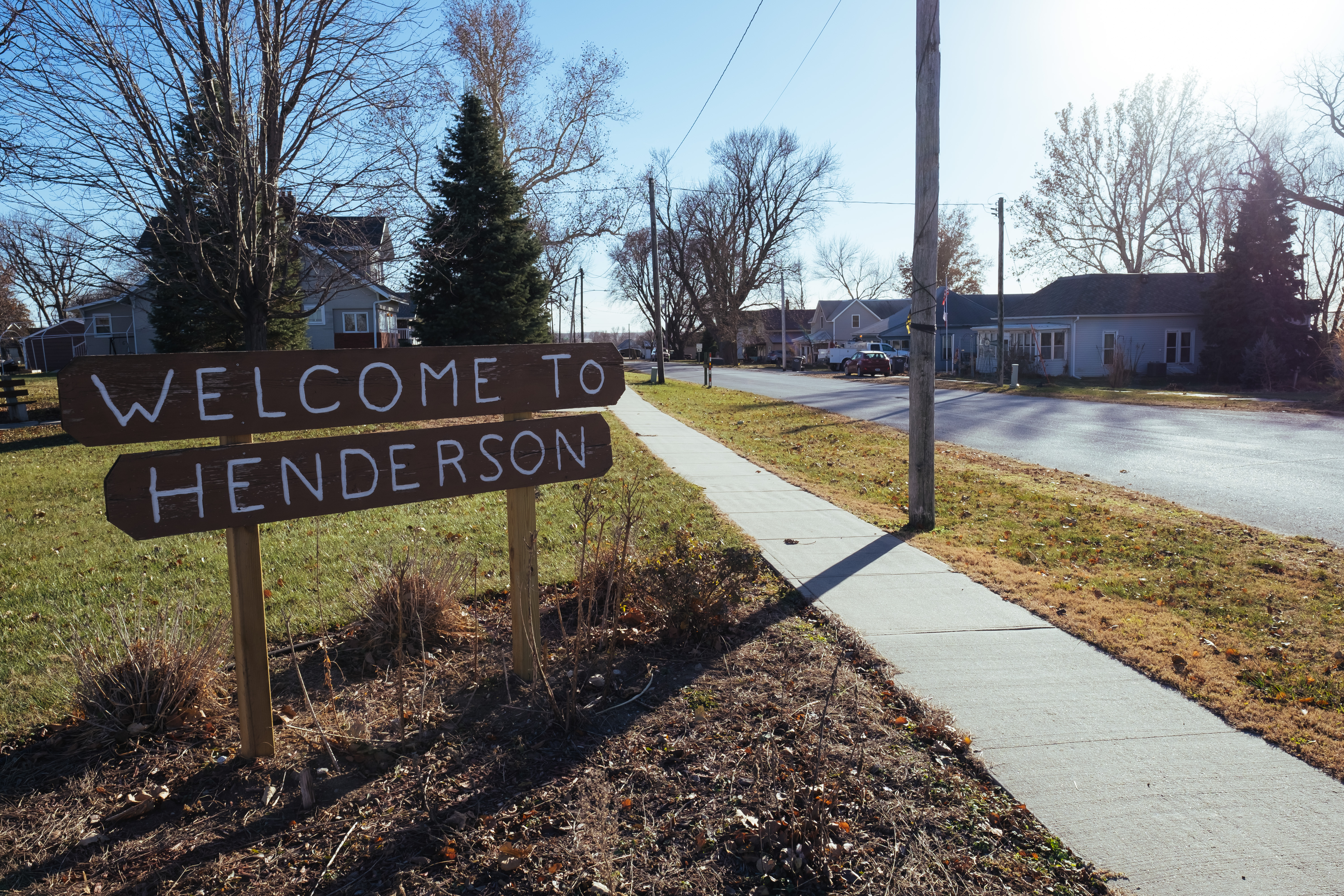
- Corner of Main and West Street

- Location of Henderson, Iowa
- Coordinates: 41°08′24″N 95°25′49″W
- Country: United States
- State: Iowa
- County: Mills
- Incorporated: 1893
- Named after: Dave Henderson

Government
  - Mayor: Eva Fipps

Area
  - Total: 0.13 sq mi (0.34 km^{2})
  - Land: 0.13 sq mi (0.34 km^{2})
  - Water: 0 sq mi (0.00 km^{2})
- Elevation: 1,050 ft (320 m)

Population (2020)
  - Total: 144
  - Density: 1,085.4/sq mi (419.07/km^{2})
- Time zone: UTC-6 (Central (CST))
  - Summer (DST): UTC-5 (CDT)
- ZIP code: 51541
- Area code: 712
- FIPS code: 19-35715
- GNIS feature ID: 2394348
- Website: www.cityofhendersoniowa.com

Henderson is a city in Mills County, Iowa, United States. The population was 144 at the time of the 2020 census.

== History ==
No buildings existed where the community lies in 1875. A community had formed by February 1877 as records show residents were forming a Church of Christ. The community was originally named Potter until 1881. Workers for railroad stayed local farmer Dave Henderson's yard and named the place Henderson Crossing; it was later shorted to Henderson. Henderson was platted in 1880 and incorporated in 1893.

== Geography ==
According to the United States Census Bureau, the city has a total area of 0.21 square miles (0.54 km^{2}), all land.

== Politics ==
The town is represented in Congress by Representative Randy Feenstra as part of Iowa's 4th congressional district.

=== Mayors ===
The current mayor of Henderson is Eva Fipps. At 20 years old, she is one of America's youngest mayors, alongside Jaylen Smith of Earle, Arkansas, who was elected at age 18. The town's first mayor was A. S. Paul, elected in the May 4, 1893 elections; in 1981, Robert Taylor served as the town's mayor.

== Demographics ==
Historical populations
Year	Pop.	±%
1890	201	—
1900	244	+21.4%
1910	240	−1.6%
1920	232	−3.3%
1930	237	+2.2%
1940	217	−8.4%
1950	208	−4.1%
1960	191	−8.2%
1970	211	+10.5%
1980	236	+11.8%
1990	206	−12.7%
2000	171	−17.0%
2010	185	+8.2%
2020	144	−22.2%
Source:"U.S. Census website". United States Census Bureau. and Iowa Data Center; Source: U.S. Decennial Census

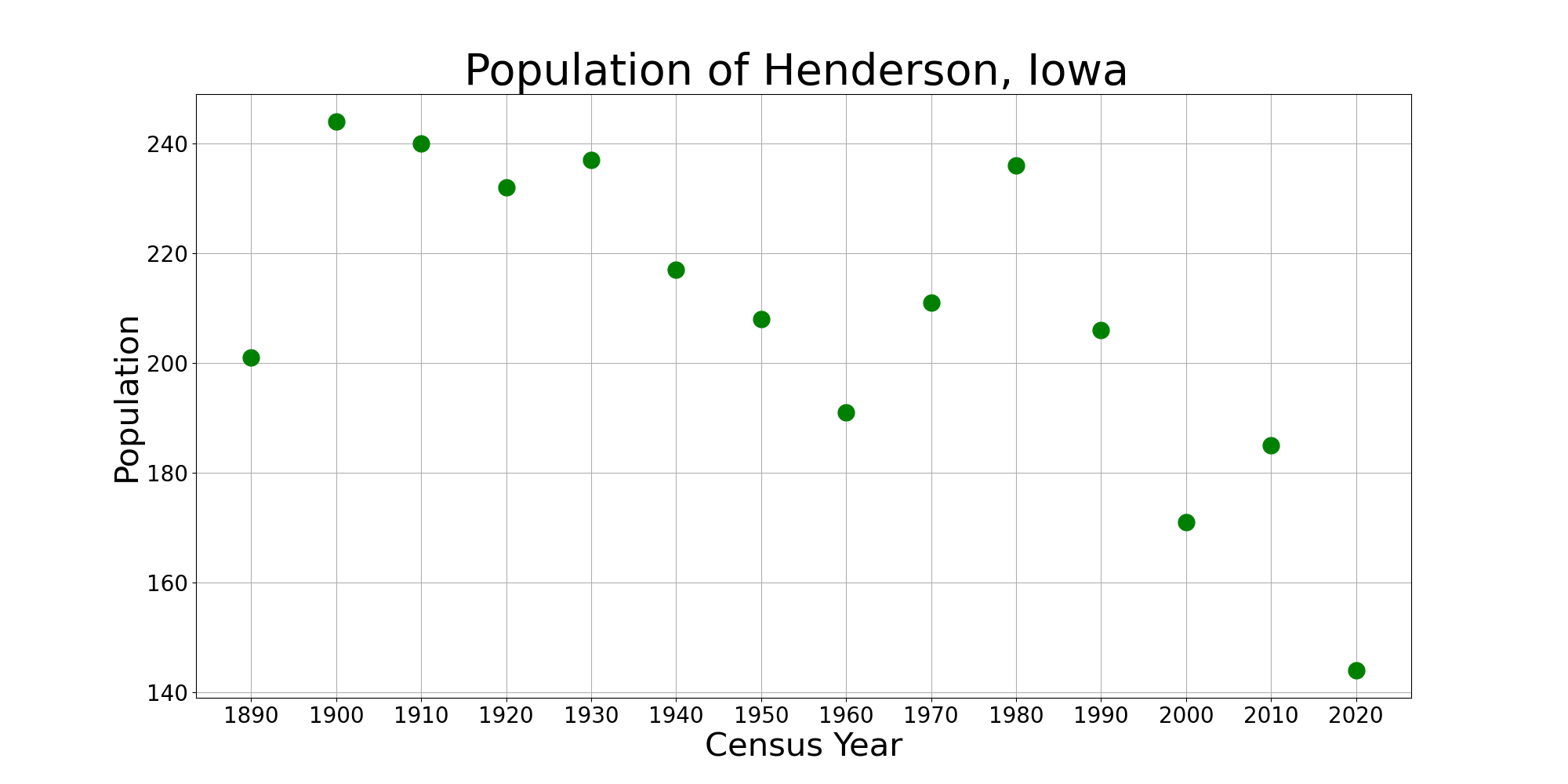
The population of Henderson, Iowa from US census data

=== 2020 census ===
As of the census of 2020, there were 144 people, 66 households, and 48 families residing in the city. The population density was 1,085.4 inhabitants per square mile (419.1/km^{2}). There were 69 housing units at an average density of 520.1 per square mile (200.8/km^{2}). The racial makeup of the city was 91.0% White, 0.0% Black or African American, 0.0% Native American, 0.0% Asian, 0.0% Pacific Islander, 0.0% from other races and 9.0% from two or more races. Hispanic or Latino persons of any race comprised 1.4% of the population.

Of the 66 households, 27.3% of which had children under the age of 18 living with them, 48.5% were married couples living together, 9.1% were cohabitating couples, 21.2% had a female householder with no spouse or partner present and 21.2% had a male householder with no spouse or partner present. 27.3% of all households were non-families. 27.3% of all households were made up of individuals, 16.7% had someone living alone who was 65 years old or older.

The median age in the city was 48.5 years. 27.1% of the residents were under the age of 20; 2.1% were between the ages of 20 and 24; 19.4% were from 25 and 44; 27.1% were from 45 and 64; and 24.3% were 65 years of age or older. The gender makeup of the city was 47.2% male and 52.8% female.

=== 2010 census ===
As of the census of 2010, there were 185 people, 74 households, and 46 families living in the city. The population density was 881.0 inhabitants per square mile (340.2/km^{2}). There were 82 housing units at an average density of 390.5 per square mile (150.8/km^{2}). The racial makeup of the city was 99.5% White and 0.5% from two or more races. Hispanic or Latino of any race were 0.5% of the population.

There were 74 households, of which 27.0% had children under the age of 18 living with them, 52.7% were married couples living together, 6.8% had a female householder with no husband present, 2.7% had a male householder with no wife present, and 37.8% were non-families. 28.4% of all households were made up of individuals, and 10.8% had someone living alone who was 65 years of age or older. The average household size was 2.50 and the average family size was 3.07.

The median age in the city was 40.9 years. 23.8% of residents were under the age of 18; 7% were between the ages of 18 and 24; 23.2% were from 25 to 44; 29.2% were from 45 to 64; and 16.8% were 65 years of age or older. The gender makeup of the city was 49.7% male and 50.3% female.

=== 2000 census ===
As of the census of 2000, there were 171 people, 74 households, and 46 families living in the city. The population density was 765.1 inhabitants per square mile (295.4/km^{2}). There were 81 housing units at an average density of 362.4 per square mile (139.9/km^{2}). The racial makeup of the city was 99.42% White, 0.58% from other races. Hispanic or Latino of any race were 1.17% of the population.

There were 74 households, out of which 27.0% had children under the age of 18 living with them, 50.0% were married couples living together, 9.5% had a female householder with no husband present, and 36.5% were non-families. 31.1% of all households were made up of individuals, and 18.9% had someone living alone who was 65 years of age or older. The average household size was 2.31 and the average family size was 2.89.

22.8% are under the age of 18, 5.8% from 18 to 24, 22.8% from 25 to 44, 26.9% from 45 to 64, and 21.6% who were 65 years of age or older. The median age was 44 years. For every 100 females, there were 96.6 males. For every 100 females age 18 and over, there were 94.1 males.

The median income for a household in the city was $45,000, and the median income for a family was $49,688. Males had a median income of $27,500 versus $21,786 for females. The per capita income for the city was $32,175. None of the families and 1.9% of the population were living below the poverty line, including no under eighteens and 6.1% of those over 64.

== Education ==
The community is within the East Mills Community School District.
