= Missouri Valley Community School District =

Public school district in Missouri Valley, Iowa, United States

Coordinates: 41.559710°N 95.894941°W

Location
- Missouri Valley, Iowa Harrison County and Pottawattamie County United States
- Coordinates: 41.559710, -95.894941

District information
- Type: Local school district
- Grades: K-12
- Superintendent: Christi Gochenour
- Schools: 3
- Budget: $12,818,000 (2020-21)
- NCES District ID: 1919440

Students and staff
- Students: 756 (2022-23)
- Teachers: 63.53 FTE
- Staff: 63.32 FTE
- Student–teacher ratio: 11.90
- Athletic conference: Western Iowa
- District mascot: Big Reds & Lady Reds
- Colors: Red and White

Other information
- Website: www.movalleyschools.org

Missouri Valley Community School District is a rural public school district headquartered in Missouri Valley, Iowa. The distract spans areas in Harrison County and Pottawattamie County. Total per pupil expenditures in the Missouri Valley Community School District totals $7,115, while the state average is $7,962.{when?}

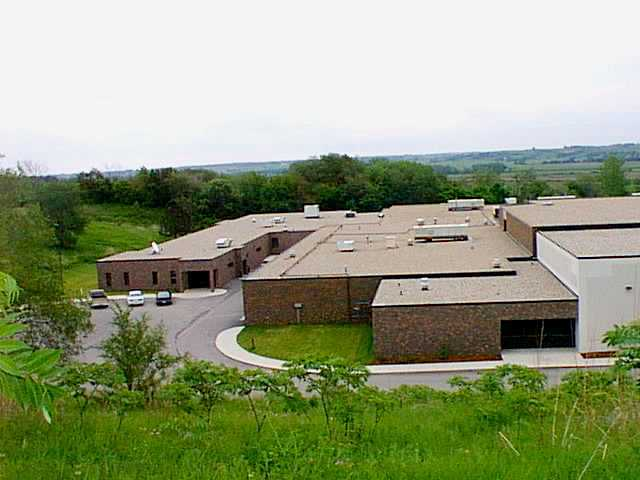
Missouri Valley Middle School

== Schools in the MVCSD ==
=== Missouri Valley Elementary School ===
The Missouri Valley Elementary School, formally known as Linn School, was built in 1956 and expanded in 1998. This building houses grades prekindergarten - 5th grades.

=== Missouri Valley Middle School ===
The Missouri Valley Middle School part was constructed so that students from the high school don't intermix but some facilities are shared. The middle school now contains 240 students in grades 6–8.

=== Missouri Valley High School ===
Built in 1976, The Missouri Valley High School has 270 students at its 605 E. Lincoln Highway location. An Iowa Communications Network fiber optics room and 4 computer labs are housed here. The school was expanded to add the middle school section in 1998 to replace the old middle school on 8th street which was torn down. A new weight room and wrestling room were added to the front of the high school in the fall of 1999.

=== Other Important Buildings ===
- District Office (Formerly Primary)

The new superintendent office is now located in the old Primary Building.

- Bus Barn
- Old Middle School Gym

== Athletics Milestones ==
The MV Big Reds Cross Country team has won the Western Iowa Conference meet at IKM-Manning in 2021.

The MV Lady Reds won the 1987 XC State Championship.

== See also ==
- List of school districts in Iowa
