= Treynor, Iowa =

Treynor (Iowa)
- City
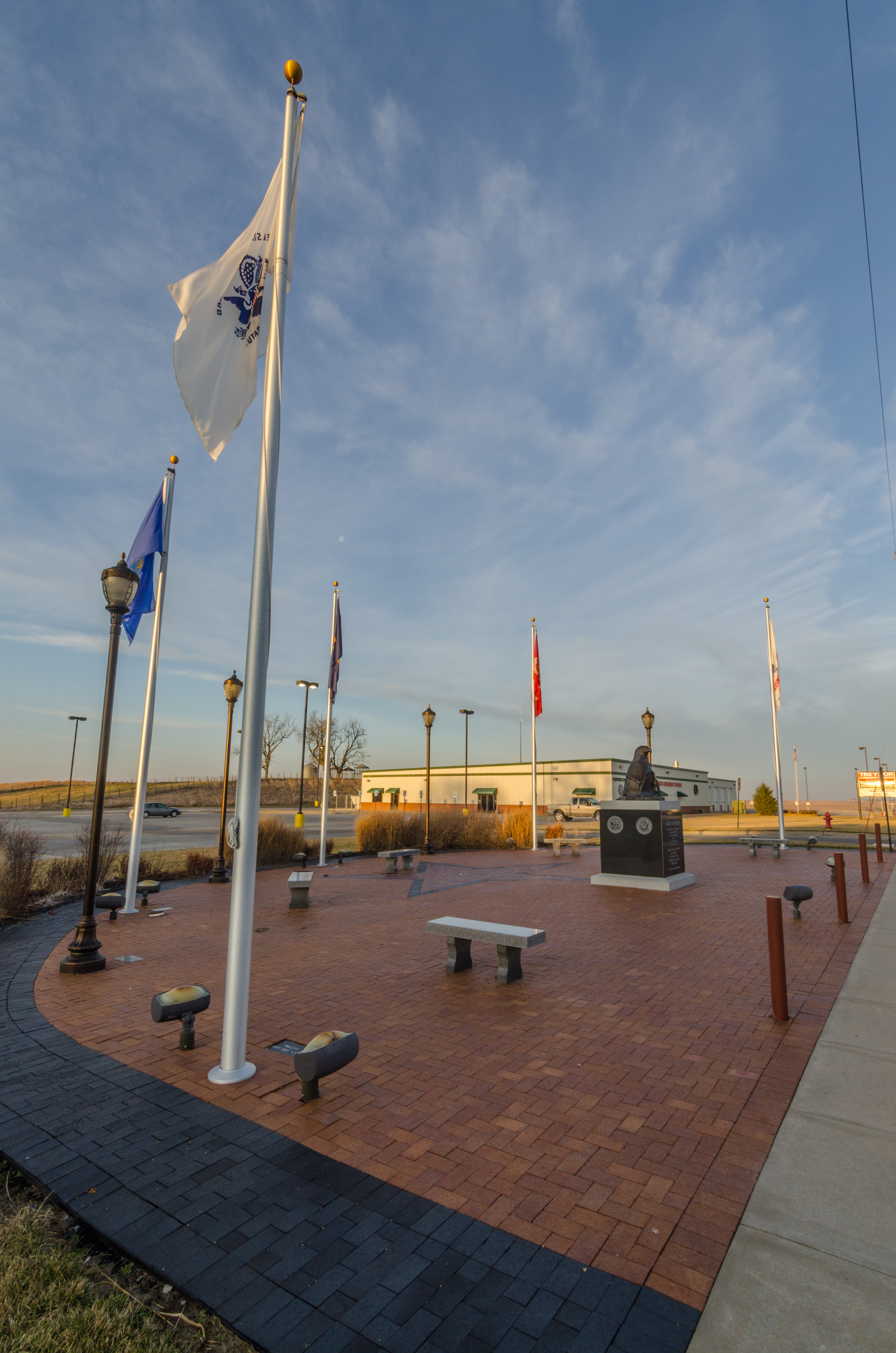
- Treynor, Iowa Veterans Memorial

- Location of Treynor in Iowa
- Coordinates: 41°13′55″N 95°36′23″W
- Country: USA
- State: Iowa
- County: Pottawattamie

Government
  - Type: City Council
  - Mayor: Allen Hadfield

Area
  - Total: 0.64 sq mi (1.67 km^{2})
  - Land: 0.64 sq mi (1.67 km^{2})
  - Water: 0 sq mi (0.00 km^{2})
- Elevation: 1,240 ft (380 m)

Population (2020)
  - Total: 1,032
  - Density: 1,600.5/sq mi (617.95/km^{2})
- Time zone: UTC-6 (Central (CST))
  - Summer (DST): UTC-5 (CDT)
- ZIP code: 51575
- Area code: 712
- FIPS code: 19-78825
- GNIS feature ID: 2397051
- Website: cityoftreynor.com

Treynor is a city in Pottawattamie County, Iowa, United States. The population was 1,032 as of the 2020 census.

== History ==
Treynor began east of Council Bluffs, Iowa, in the late 1880s with the establishment of Fritz Eyberg's General Store, August Olderog's dance hall and saloon, and St Paul's German Evangelical Church. The vicinity east of Middle Silver Creek had previously been known for its number of wolves. Local German immigrant farmers referred to the settlement as Four Corners or High Five, a popular card name, until the post office opened in the early 1890s as Treynor, named after the recently deceased Council Bluffs postmaster.

By the time the town was incorporated in 1905, it included two general stores, two saloons, a furniture/implement house, a livery stable, several blacksmith shops, and the Treynor State Bank. In 1911, the community got its own railroad with the opening of the Iowa & Omaha Shortline which ran 12 miles to Neoga, a small depot on the Wabash Railroad line southeast of Council Bluffs. The line was unprofitable and ended operations after five years.

The Great Depression closed down the Treynor State Bank while improvements began on the "Short-line" Road from Treynor to Council Bluffs that is now Iowa Highway 92. A US Army Air Defense Command (ARADCOM) Nike Hercules missile base operated just outside town during the early years of the Cold War.

== Geography ==
According to the United States Census Bureau, the city has a total area of 0.58 square miles (1.50 km^{2}), all land.

== Demographics ==
Historical populations
Year	Pop.	±%
1910	122	—
1920	204	+67.2%
1930	232	+13.7%
1940	219	−5.6%
1950	247	+12.8%
1960	368	+49.0%
1970	472	+28.3%
1980	981	+107.8%
1990	897	−8.6%
2000	950	+5.9%
2010	919	−3.3%
2020	1,032	+12.3%
Source:"U.S. Census website". United States Census Bureau. and Iowa Data Center; Source: U.S. Decennial Census

=== 2020 census ===
As of the 2020 census, there were 1,032 people, 394 households, and 295 families residing in the city. The population density was 1,600.5 inhabitants per square mile (618.0/km^{2}). There were 413 housing units at an average density of 640.5 per square mile (247.3/km^{2}). There were 413 housing units, of which 4.6% were vacant. The homeowner vacancy rate was 0.3% and the rental vacancy rate was 2.4%.

0.0% of residents lived in urban areas, while 100.0% lived in rural areas.

Of the 394 households, 37.6% had children under the age of 18 living in them. Of all households, 64.2% were married-couple households, 3.6% were cohabitating-couple households, 10.9% were households with a male householder and no spouse or partner present, and 21.3% were households with a female householder and no spouse or partner present. About 25.1% of households were non-families, 21.9% of all households were made up of individuals, and 11.2% had someone living alone who was 65 years of age or older.

The median age in the city was 38.0 years. 28.1% of residents were under the age of 18 and 17.9% were 65 years of age or older. 30.0% of residents were under the age of 20; 3.3% were between the ages of 20 and 24; 26.5% were from 25 to 44; and 22.3% were from 45 to 64. The gender makeup of the city was 47.7% male and 52.3% female. For every 100 females there were 91.1 males, and for every 100 females age 18 and over there were 87.4 males age 18 and over.

Racial composition as of the 2020 census
Race	Number	Percent
White	1,003	97.2%
Black or African American	1	0.1%
American Indian and Alaska Native	1	0.1%
Asian	2	0.2%
Native Hawaiian and Other Pacific Islander	0	0.0%
Some other race	1	0.1%
Two or more races	24	2.3%
Hispanic or Latino (of any race)	10	1.0%

=== 2010 census ===
As of the census of 2010, there were 919 people, 363 households, and 269 families living in the city. The population density was 1,584.5 inhabitants per square mile (611.8/km^{2}). There were 381 housing units at an average density of 656.9 per square mile (253.6/km^{2}). The racial makeup of the city was 99.9% White and 0.1% African American. Hispanic or Latino of any race were 0.1% of the population.

There were 363 households, of which 35.8% had children under the age of 18 living with them, 64.2% were married couples living together, 7.7% had a female householder with no husband present, 2.2% had a male householder with no wife present, and 25.9% were non-families. 23.4% of all households were made up of individuals, and 10.8% had someone living alone who was 65 years of age or older. The average household size was 2.53 and the average family size was 3.01.

The median age in the city was 40.7 years. 26.4% of residents were under the age of 18; 6.2% were between the ages of 18 and 24; 23.8% were from 25 to 44; 28.2% were from 45 to 64; and 15.3% were 65 years of age or older. The gender makeup of the city was 48.6% male and 51.4% female.

=== 2000 census ===
As of the census of 2000, there were 950 people, 362 households, and 274 families living in the city. The population density was 1,620.1 inhabitants per square mile (625.5/km^{2}). There were 373 housing units at an average density of 636.1 per square mile (245.6/km^{2}). The racial makeup of the city was 99.68% White, 0.11% African American and 0.21% Asian. Hispanic or Latino of any race were 0.11% of the population.

There were 362 households, out of which 37.0% had children under the age of 18 living with them, 63.5% were married couples living together, 8.8% had a female householder with no husband present, and 24.3% were non-families. 22.7% of all households were made up of individuals, and 14.6% had someone living alone who was 65 years of age or older. The average household size was 2.62 and the average family size was 3.08.

28.2% are under the age of 18, 5.9% from 18 to 24, 26.7% from 25 to 44, 23.7% from 45 to 64, and 15.5% who were 65 years of age or older. The median age was 39 years. For every 100 females, there were 98.7 males. For every 100 females age 18 and over, there were 96.0 males.

The median income for a household in the city was $56,696, and the median income for a family was $65,357. Males had a median income of $41,771 versus $25,577 for females. The per capita income for the city was $22,118. About 1.5% of families and 2.7% of the population were below the poverty line, including 0.7% of those under age 18 and 3.6% of those age 65 or over.

== Education ==
Treynor Community School District serves the town and the surrounding areas.
