= Treynor Community School District =

Public school district in Treynor, Iowa, United States

Coordinates: 41.230881°N 95.6074°W

Location
- Treynor, Iowa Pottawattamie County and Mills County United States
- Coordinates: 41.230881, -95.6074

District information
- Type: Local school district
- Grades: K-12
- Superintendent: Joel Beyenhof
- Schools: 3
- Budget: $11,526,000 (2020-21)
- NCES District ID: 1927960

Students and staff
- Students: 795 (2022-23)
- Teachers: 52.05 FTE
- Staff: 59.49 FTE
- Student–teacher ratio: 15.27
- Athletic conference: Western Iowa
- District mascot: Cardinals
- Colors: Red and White

Other information
- Website: www.treynorschools.org

The Treynor Community School District is a rural public school district headquartered in Treynor, Iowa.

The majority of the district is in Pottawattamie County, with a small area in Mills County. It serves Treynor and the surrounding rural areas.

The school mascot is the Cardinal and the colors are red and white.

== Schools ==
The district operates three schools, all in Treynor:

- Treynor Elementary School
- Treynor Middle School
- Treynor High School

=== Treynor High School ===
==== Athletics ====
The Cardinals compete in the Western Iowa Conference in the following sports:

- Cross Country
- Volleyball
- Football
  - 2-time State Champions (1979, 2003)
- Basketball
  - Boys' 2015 Class 2A State Champions
  - Girls' 1994 Class 1A State Champions
- Wrestling
- Track and Field
  - Boys' 3-time State Champions (1966, 1980, 2004)
- Golf
- Soccer
- Baseball
- Softball
  - 2012 Class 2A State Champions

== See also ==
- List of school districts in Iowa
- List of high schools in Iowa
