= Missouri Valley, Iowa =

- City
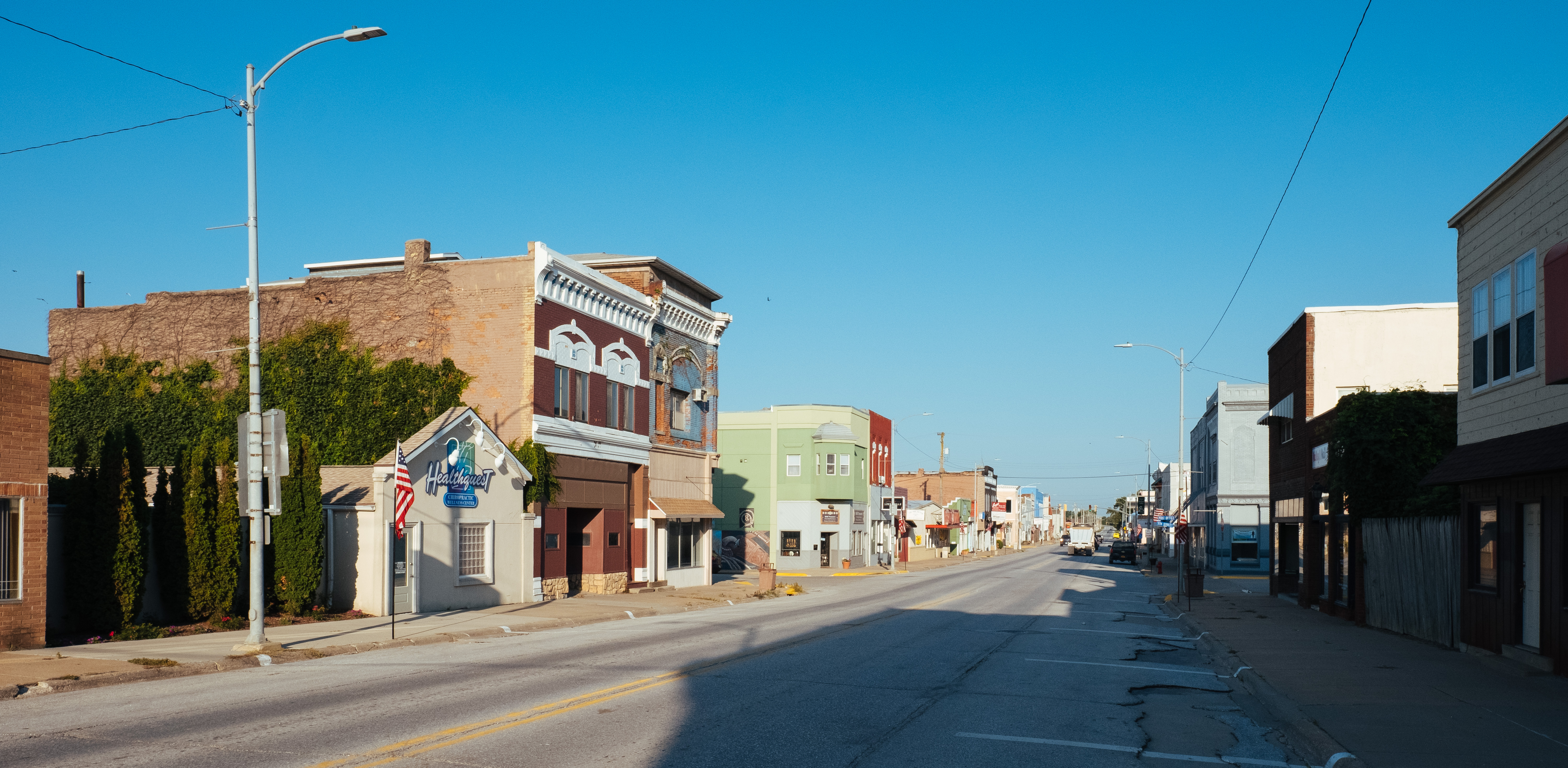
- Lincoln Highway in Missouri Valley

- Location of Missouri Valley, Iowa
- Coordinates: 41°33′34″N 95°54′09″W
- Country: USA
- State: Iowa
- County: Harrison
- Incorporated: October 30, 1871

Area
  - Total: 3.36 sq mi (8.71 km^{2})
  - Land: 3.36 sq mi (8.71 km^{2})
  - Water: 0 sq mi (0.00 km^{2})
- Elevation: 1,001 ft (305 m)

Population (2020)
  - Total: 2,678
  - Density: 796/sq mi (307.5/km^{2})
- Time zone: UTC-6 (Central (CST))
  - Summer (DST): UTC-5 (CDT)
- ZIP code: 51555
- Area code: 712
- FIPS code: 19-52860
- GNIS feature ID: 2395356
- Website: http://www.cityofmissourivalley.com

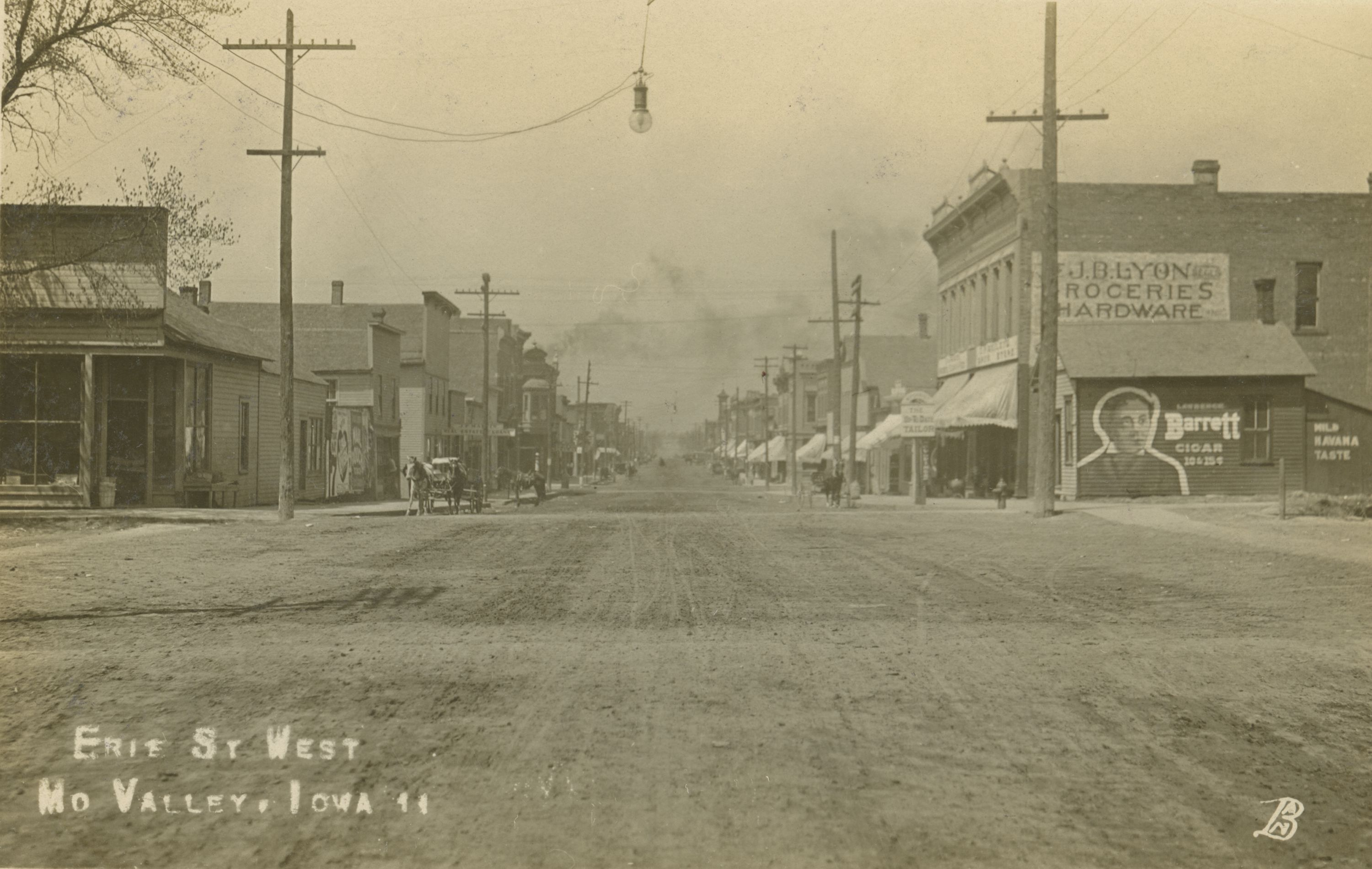
Main Street, 1905

Missouri Valley is a city in Harrison County, Iowa, United States. The population was 2,678 at the time of the 2020 census.

== History ==
Originally, Missouri Valley was known as St. John's (Findley or Old St. Johns), and established in 1856. This settlement was founded at the intersection of the Chicago & Northwestern, Sioux City & Pacific, and the Fremont, Elkhorn & Missouri Valley lines. Following the collapse of wildcat banks in 1858 and the near completion of the railroad, the town was moved 2 miles from its original location and renamed "New St. Johns". The town was formally renamed a second time soon after, this time being named after the valley of the Missouri River.

Missouri Valley was formally laid out in 1867 when the Chicago and North Western Railway was extended to that point. Missouri Valley was a true railroad town in the late 1800s. The Sioux City and Pacific's headquarters was there and with it came the associated repair and machine shops, blacksmith, round house, etc. By 1896 population was approaching 4,000 and 25 passenger trains were coming in and out of Missouri Valley each day on 3 different lines. In 1900 the city adopted a resolution that the railroads were its chief industry and main sustenance.

== Geography ==
According to the United States Census Bureau, the city has a total area of 3.13 square miles (8.11 km^{2}), all of it land. Missouri Valley is located within Iowa's Loess Hills.

== Demographics ==
Historical populations
Year	Pop.	±%
1880	1,154	—
1890	2,797	+142.4%
1900	4,010	+43.4%
1910	3,187	−20.5%
1920	3,985	+25.0%
1930	4,230	+6.1%
1940	3,994	−5.6%
1950	3,546	−11.2%
1960	3,567	+0.6%
1970	3,519	−1.3%
1980	3,107	−11.7%
1990	2,888	−7.0%
2000	2,992	+3.6%
2010	2,838	−5.1%
2020	2,678	−5.6%
Source:"U.S. Census website". United States Census Bureau. and Iowa Data Center; Source: U.S. Decennial Census

=== 2020 census ===
As of the 2020 census, Missouri Valley had a population of 2,678, with 1,136 households and 627 families residing in the city. The population density was 796.4 inhabitants per square mile (307.5/km^{2}), and there were 1,285 housing units at an average density of 382.2 per square mile (147.6/km^{2}).

The median age was 42.1 years. 21.6% of residents were under the age of 18. 24.2% of residents were under the age of 20; 5.9% were between the ages of 20 and 24; 23.1% were from 25 to 44; 25.2% were from 45 to 64; and 21.6% were 65 years of age or older. For every 100 females there were 95.0 males, and for every 100 females age 18 and over there were 93.6 males age 18 and over. The gender makeup of the city was 48.7% male and 51.3% female.

There were 1,136 households, of which 26.0% had children under the age of 18 living in them. Of all households, 38.0% were married-couple households, 22.7% were households with a male householder and no spouse or partner present, and 29.6% were households with a female householder and no spouse or partner present. In total, 44.8% of households were non-families. About 36.6% of all households were made up of individuals and 16.5% had someone living alone who was 65 years of age or older.

There were 1,285 housing units, of which 11.6% were vacant. The homeowner vacancy rate was 5.1% and the rental vacancy rate was 9.3%. 0.0% of residents lived in urban areas, while 100.0% lived in rural areas.

Racial composition as of the 2020 census
Race	Number	Percent
White	2,514	93.9%
Black or African American	3	0.1%
American Indian and Alaska Native	12	0.4%
Asian	14	0.5%
Native Hawaiian and Other Pacific Islander	2	0.1%
Some other race	20	0.7%
Two or more races	113	4.2%
Hispanic or Latino (of any race)	90	3.4%

=== 2010 census ===
As of the census of 2010, there were 2,838 people, 1,160 households, and 707 families living in the city. The population density was 906.7 inhabitants per square mile (350.1/km^{2}). There were 1,291 housing units at an average density of 412.5 units per square mile (159.3 units/km^{2}). The racial makeup of the city was 97.6% White, 0.3% African American, 0.3% Native American, 0.1% Asian, 0.5% from other races, and 1.2% from two or more races. Hispanic or Latino of any race were 2.1% of the population.

There were 1,160 households, of which 32.3% had children under the age of 18 living with them, 44.4% were married couples living together, 11.5% had a female householder with no husband present, 5.1% had a male householder with no wife present, and 39.1% were non-families. 34.1% of all households were made up of individuals, and 15.7% had someone living alone who was 65 years of age or older. The average household size was 2.36 and the average family size was 2.99.

The median age in the city was 39.7 years. 24.4% of residents were under the age of 18; 8.1% were between the ages of 18 and 24; 23.8% were from 25 to 44; 24.7% were from 45 to 64; and 19% were 65 years of age or older. The gender makeup of the city was 47.7% male and 52.3% female.

=== 2000 census ===
As of the census of 2000, there were 2,992 people, 1,222 households, and 779 families living in the city. The population density was 982.9 inhabitants per square mile (379.5/km^{2}). There were 1,300 housing units at an average density of 427.1 units per square mile (164.9 units/km^{2}). The racial makeup of the city was 99.03% White, 0.03% Native American, 0.07% Asian, 0.20% from other races, and 0.67% from two or more races. Hispanic or Latino of any race were 0.70% of the population.

There were 1,222 households, out of which 30.2% had children under the age of 18 living with them, 49.5% were married couples living together, 10.1% had a female householder with no husband present, and 36.2% were non-families. 31.7% of all households were made up of individuals, and 16.9% had someone living alone who was 65 years of age or older. The average household size was 2.35 and the average family size was 2.96.

Age spread: 23.6% under the age of 18, 9.2% from 18 to 24, 28.1% from 25 to 44, 19.6% from 45 to 64, and 19.5% who were 65 years of age or older. The median age was 38 years. For every 100 females, there were 89.1 males. For every 100 females age 18 and over, there were 85.4 males.

The median income for a household in the city was $36,594, and the median income for a family was $47,250. Males had a median income of $28,109 versus $22,396 for females. The per capita income for the city was $18,031. About 3.1% of families and 5.6% of the population were below the poverty line, including 5.5% of those under age 18 and 5.3% of those age 65 or over.

== Education ==
The community of Missouri Valley and the surrounding rural area educational needs are met by the Missouri Valley Community School District.

Saint Albert Catholic Schools in Council Bluffs takes students from Missouri Valley.

== Infrastructure ==
=== Transportation ===
Missouri Valley is located on both sides of U.S. Route 30 on the east side of Interstate 29 near exit 75. The city is also serviced by L20 a county road running north and south, and F66 a county road running east from its junction with U.S. 30.

== Notable people ==
- Hugh A. Butler (1878–1954), United States Senator who represented Nebraska
- Margarita Fischer (1886–1975), stage actress who also performed in over 175 silent motion pictures
