= Iowa Highway 144 =

State highway in Iowa, United States

Iowa Highway 144
- Iowa 144 highlighted in red

Route information
- Maintained by Iowa DOT
- Length: 34.039 mi (54.780 km)

Major junctions
- South end: Iowa 141 / CR P58 in Perry
- US 30 at Grand Junction
- North end: Iowa 175 near Gowrie

Location
- Country: United States
- State: Iowa
- Counties: Dallas; Boone; Greene; Webster

Highway system
- Iowa Primary Highway System; Interstate; US; State; Secondary; Scenic
← Iowa 143	→ Iowa 146

Iowa Highway 144 (Iowa 144) is a state highway in central Iowa. The highway has a length of 34 miles (55 km) and runs in a north–south direction. It begins in Perry at an intersection with Iowa Highway 141, while it ends at an intersection with Iowa Highway 175 between Gowrie and Harcourt.

== Route description ==
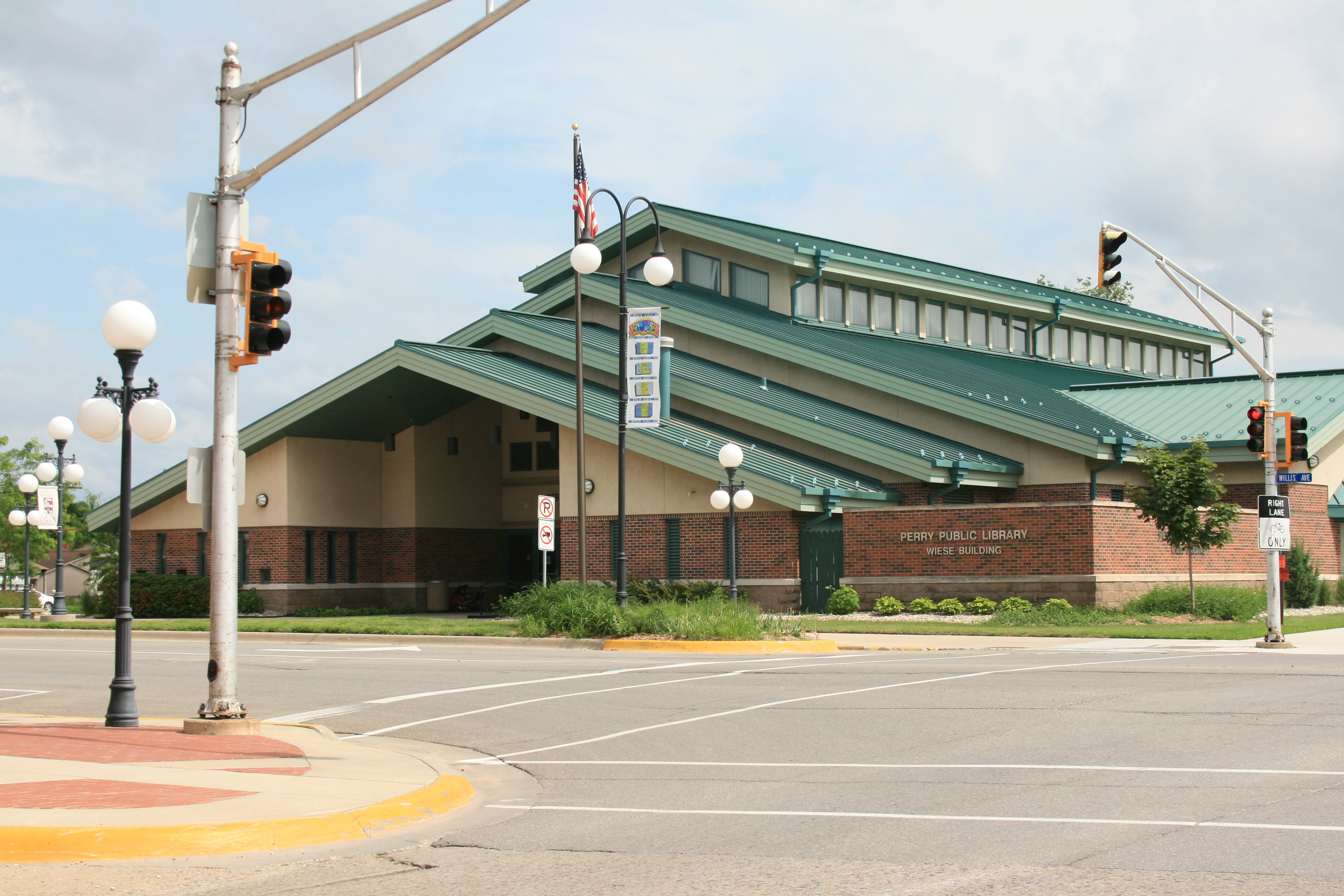
Iowa 144 passes the library in Perry.

Iowa Highway 144 begins at Iowa Highway 141 in the southern part of Perry. Iowa 144 heads north along First Street where it intersects Willis Avenue, a former alignment of Iowa 141 before it became an expressway. North of Perry, Iowa 144 enters Boone County for just under 5 miles (8.0 km). The Boone County stretch of Iowa 144 is predominantly east–west, while the rest of the highway is north–south.

In Greene County, Iowa 144 turns to the northwest, along an abandoned railroad line, and goes through Rippey. Three miles (4.8 km) northwest of Rippey, the highway turns to the north and travels another three miles to Grand Junction. At Grand Junction, Iowa 144 crosses the main Union Pacific Railroad line before intersecting U.S. Highway 30 on the northern side of town. North of Grand Junction, Iowa 144 continues north through Dana and passes near Paton before ending at Iowa Highway 175 halfway between Gowrie and Harcourt.

== History ==
Iowa Highway 144, upon creation in 1926, only went between Grand Junction and what was then Iowa Highway 47 (modern Iowa Highway 175). In 1941 the segment south from Grand Junction to Perry was added. In 1980, the segment in Webster County was decommissioned, but was recommissioned in 1982.

== Major intersections ==
County	Location	mi	km	Destinations	Notes
Dallas	Perry	0.000	0.000	Iowa 141 / CR P58 south – Urbandale, Coon Rapids	
Boone	No major junctions				
Greene	Grand Junction	18.017	28.996	US 30 – Jefferson, Ogden	
Webster	Grove Township	34.039	54.780	Iowa 175 – Gowrie, Dayton	
1.000 mi = 1.609 km; 1.000 km = 0.621 mi
