= Tornado outbreak and derecho of December 15–16, 2021 =

Powerful wind storm in the U.S. midwest

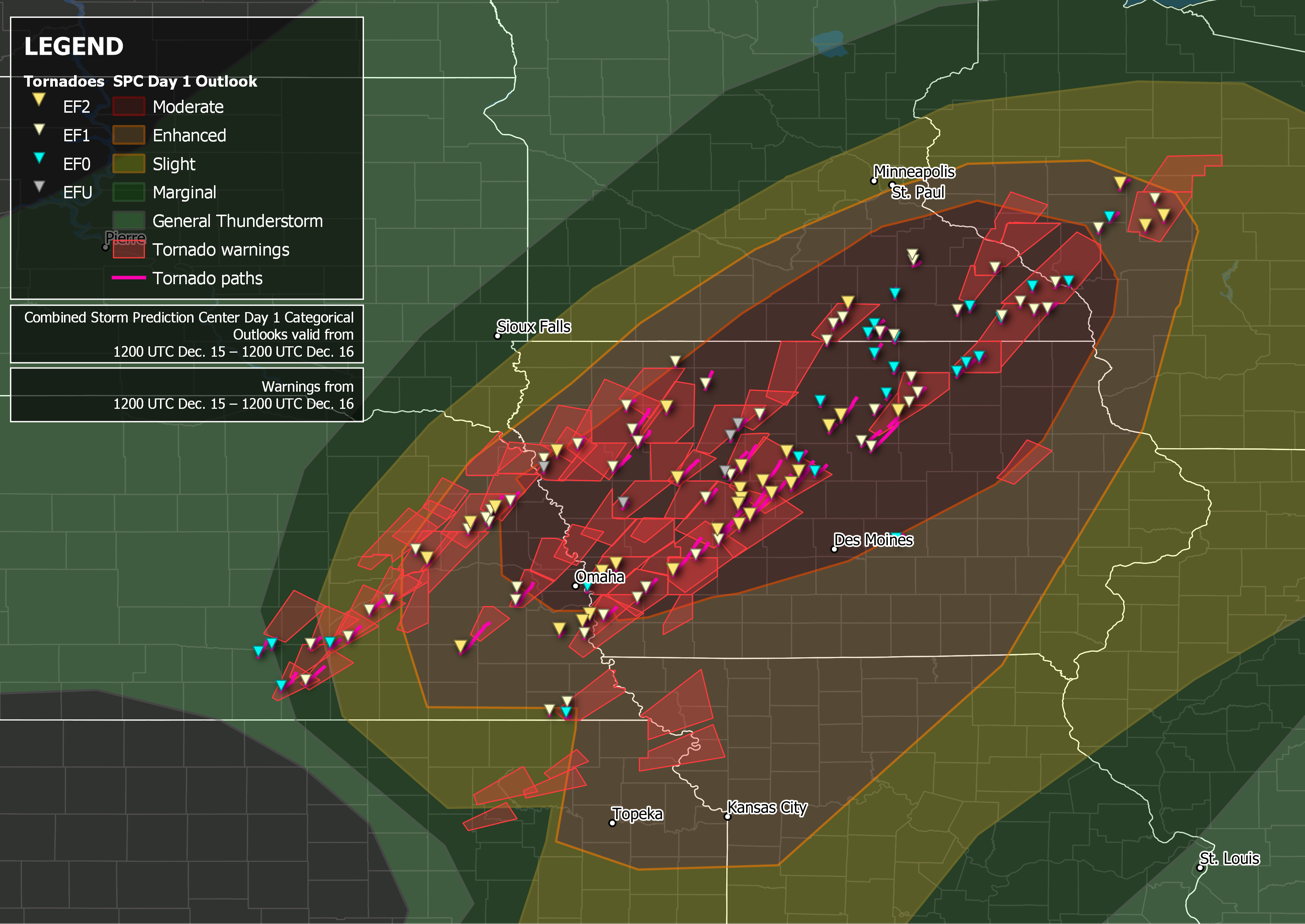
- Composite of tornado warnings and confirmed tornadoes on December 15–16, 2021

Meteorological history
- Duration: December 15–16, 2021

Tornado outbreak
- Tornadoes: 120 (Record for a tornado outbreak in December)
- Max. rating: EF2 tornado
- Duration: 7 hours, 56 minutes

Derecho
- Highest gusts: 100 mph (160 km/h) near Russell, Kansas (Derecho);

Extratropical cyclone
- Highest gusts: 112 mph (180 km/h) at Red Mountain Pass, Colorado (non-thunderstorm)
- Lowest pressure: 967 mbar (28.6 inHg)
- Max. rainfall: 8.74 in (222 mm) on Mount Tamalpais
- Max. snowfall: 60 in (1,500 mm) east of Pinecrest, California

Overall effects
- Fatalities: 5 direct, 2 indirect (Note: The 2 indirect deaths were as a result of the 2021 Kansas wildfire outbreak, which was partially caused by this storm)
- Damage: $1.8 billion (2021 USD)
- Areas affected: Western United States, Midwestern United States, Canada
- Power outages: >600,000
- Part of the tornado outbreaks of 2021, the 2021–22 North American winter and 2021 wildfire season

On December 15, 2021, a rapidly-deepening low-pressure area contributed to a historic expanse of inclement weather across the Great Plains and Midwestern United States, resulting in an unprecedented December derecho and tornado outbreak across portions of the Northern United States, a region normally affected by snow and cold weather during this time of year. Non-thunderstorm winds spurred the formation of rapidly-moving fires across Colorado and western Kansas, with attendant dust and debris spreading eastward. From central Kansas northeastward into eastern Wisconsin, the powerful derecho led to hundreds of damaging wind reports. At least 57 hurricane-force wind reports were received by the National Weather Service, signaling the most prolific wind event in the United States dating back to at least 2004. Numerous embedded circulations within this rapidly-progressing derecho produced dozens of tornadoes, including 33 that were rated EF2. The culmination of non-thunderstorm, thunderstorm, and tornadic winds caused widespread damage to structures, trees, power lines, and vehicles across the Plains and Midwest. At least 600,000 people lost power on December 15, and temperatures dropped significantly across the affected region following the event, causing accumulating snow, which hindered cleanup and recovery efforts. The storm killed at least 5 people directly, as well as 2 people indirectly through wildfires partly spawned by the storm, and caused at least $1.8 billion (2021 USD) in damages. The number of tornadoes in this event broke a record for largest outbreak in the month of December that had been set less than a week prior. The event also became one of the largest single-day outbreaks in recorded history, with 120 tornadoes occurring over an eight-hour period.

== Meteorological synopsis ==
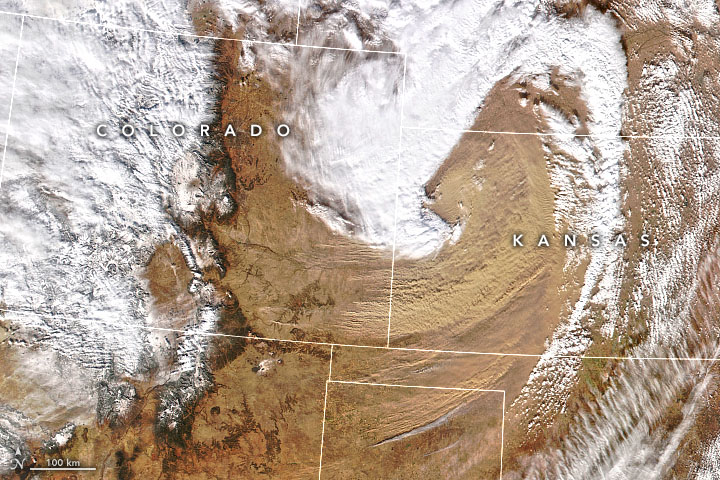
Visible satellite imagery of the storm system rapidly strengthening on December 15

On December 15, the Storm Prediction Center (SPC) noted the potential for a widespread, damaging wind event across the Central United States. An intense, negatively tilted shortwave trough, with winds up to 145 mph (233 km/h) in the mid-levels of the atmosphere and similarly strong winds up to 90 mph (140 km/h) just above the surface, was forecast to progress from the Four Corners region into the upper Mississippi Valley. An attendant low-pressure area was expected to support a dry line and cold front down into northeastern Missouri.

Ahead of these features, an unseasonable airmass was expected to take shape across multiple states, with temperatures up to 72 °F (22 °C) above average breaking monthly records in Iowa, seeing a record high December temperature of 76 °F (24 °C). Wisconsin also saw a record high December temperature of 72 °F (22 °C) in the leadup to the storm. In Iowa, dew points surged to the upper 50s and lower 60s Fahrenheit, while convective available potential energy values – a measure of instability – were predicted to reach 500–1,000 J/kg. Given these factors, in conjunction with an eroding capping inversion, forecasters expected a narrow but intense line of severe thunderstorms to develop and overspread the Mid-Missouri and Upper Mississippi valleys. Widespread wind gusts of 60–75 mph (97–121 km/h), with localized gusts up to 100 mph (160 km/h), were messaged. While damaging winds were expected to be the most widespread threat, a few tornadoes were outlined as a possibility, including the potential for one or two strong (EF2+) tornadoes. The highest dew point in Iowa reached 64 °F (18 °C).

The first tornado watch of the day was issued at 19:20 UTC and encompassed areas from northeastern Kansas northeastward into southern Minnesota as a rapidly-moving squall line developed. Much of this area was encompassed in a level 1/5 marginal risk when forecasters first outlined the severe potential on December 13, but it was rapidly upgraded to a level 4/5 moderate risk on the morning of December 15, the first moderate risk ever issued across Iowa, Minnesota, and Wisconsin in December.

== Plains wind storm ==
In addition to damaging winds spurred by severe thunderstorms, damaging non-convective winds were expected to overspread much of the Central United States. Various offices of the National Weather Service placed a cumulative 84 million people under a high wind warning, an unusually large expanse of high wind potential. Indeed, the local weather office in the Twin Cities noted that "today's volatile day of weather has not been seen before in mid-December."

The intensity and breadth of dry winds resulted in very dangerous fire weather conditions across the Central Plains, where the SPC outlined an extremely critical risk area from the Texas Panhandle into central Kansas. By the end of the day, more than 600,000 customers were without power stretching from Colorado to Wisconsin.

=== Colorado ===
The Colorado Department of Public Health and Environment enacted an Air Quality Alert across the Front Range due to the expected combination of dirt and dust. In anticipation of the inclement weather, numerous school districts were closed or placed on delays. Dozens of state-managed and partner-managed coronavirus community testing, vaccine, and monoclonal antibody sites were closed. The Regional Transportation District in Denver advised that operational disruptions to services were possible. The annual Denver Christkindlmarket, a holiday market celebrating German tradition, and the nearby Monarch Mountain ski resort were closed. Rolling road closures were enacted along Interstate 70 and Interstate 25, the latter of which was the scene of at least six flipped semi-trailers. Closures were enacted across several smaller highways due to safety concerns too. In Pueblo, city bus services were suspended for three hours. In addition to tree damage, cars and fences were blown over, power lines were downed, and roofs were ripped off homes.

Denver International Airport reported 131 canceled flights and 475 delayed flights after it was placed on a ground delay, with an average delay of 129 minutes for travelers. Wind gusts were measured at 107 mph (172 km/h) in Lamar and 112 mph (180 km/h) in higher-elevation Red Mountain Pass. More than 500 separate power outages were reported by Xcel Energy, culminating in more than 60,000 customers without power across the state. These outages impacted Penrose Hospital in Colorado Springs, where procedures and the release of patients were delayed. The Colorado Springs Fire Department responded to a large gas line break at the Chapel Hills Mall and evacuated that structure. Strong winds felled trees, causing damage to several homes in Englewood. One woman was injured when strong winds pushed her over and resulted in a broken hip.

=== Kansas ===
In preparation for inclement weather, multiple school districts in southwestern Kansas canceled classes. Strong winds stirred up dust across Kansas, causing the state's department of transportation to close numerous highways. Interstate 70 from the Colorado–Kansas state line eastward to Salina was closed because of crashes blocking the roadway. Two separate car crashes led to the deaths of three people across Kansas owing to poor visibility. A "life-threatening grass fire" was reported in Russell County by the Wichita, Kansas National Weather Service. In Dodge City, wind gusts up to 84 mph (135 km/h), caused widespread damage to trees, power lines, roofs, and traffic lights in the city; this value far exceeded any previous wind reports measured in the month of December there.

== Derecho ==
Derecho moving across eastern Nebraska and western Iowa

During the afternoon hours of December 15, a narrow but intense line of thunderstorms developed across Nebraska and Kansas. This line of convection intensified as it moved rapidly northeastward, reaching eastern Iowa and western Wisconsin by the end of the day. Given the breadth of damaging winds associated with this thunderstorm activity, with over 400 instances of severe wind across a wide expanse of the Midwest, the severe weather event was officially classified as a derecho. The SPC logged 64 hurricane-force, 75 mph (121 km/h) or greater wind reports, making December 15 the most prolific wind event in United States history at the time. The record was broken with 68 hurricane-force wind gusts on May 12, 2022.

First reports of damage filtered in from western and central Kansas. In Russell, gusts measured at 100 mph (160 km/h) blew roofs off homes and uprooted trees. Strong winds of 94 mph (151 km/h) were reported near Junction City, where hangars were damaged at the airport, siding was ripped from buildings, and metal signs were bent. In southern Topeka, the Frito Lay Plant sustained damage. Kansas Governor Laura Kelly issued an inclement weather declaration for Shawnee County, sending executive branch agency personnel home. Semi-trucks were overturned in at least four locations across north-central Kansas. Over 200,000 residents across Kansas were without power at the height of the power outages, resulting in some of the most widespread damage statewide power provider Evergy had seen. Over 1,110 workers began to assess the aftermath of the storm, and requests for assistance were extended to neighboring states.

In neighboring Nebraska, winds up to 85 mph (137 km/h) were measured at Grand Island, where nearby rail cars were blown over. Widespread reports of toppled trees, overturned semi-trucks, downed power lines, and blown out vehicle windows were received by local authorities. Lancaster County was principally hard hit, with structural damage to an apartment complex's roof; Lincoln Airport recorded a gust of 93 mph (150 km/h). In that city alone, more than 6,000 Lincoln Electric System customers were without power in the wake of the storms.

In Iowa, where the Department of Transportation closed bridges and the United States Army Corps of Engineers restricted access to the Saylorville Lake Dam in preparation for the weather event, similarly destructive winds were observed. Hundreds of reports of power outages filtered in across the state as widespread hurricane-force gusts were recorded, reaching 88 mph (142 km/h) in Audubon. One man was killed after a gust overturned his tractor trailer. In neighboring Minnesota, another man died after a tree landed on him.

Further east, wind gusts in Illinois reached 74 mph (119 km/h). The derecho also led to an unusual thunderstorm in the Upper Peninsula of Michigan, where temperatures were 51 °F (11 °C), well above average and a daily high temperature record for Houghton.

== Tornado outbreak ==
The tornado outbreak set a new record for the most tornadoes to hit Iowa in a single day with 61, far exceeding the previous record of 35 tornadoes set on August 31, 2014. Additionally, 21 of the tornadoes in Iowa were rated EF2 which beat the previous record of 16 EF2/F2 or greater tornadoes set on June 7, 1984. Prior to this event, there had only been five December tornadoes in Iowa, all in southeast Iowa. This outbreak also marked the first time that tornadoes were recorded in Minnesota in the month of December. Additionally, it was the first time since record keeping began in 1986 that the National Weather Service Forecast Office in Sioux Falls, South Dakota had to issue both severe thunderstorm and tornado warnings during the month of December, with 6 and 8 issued, respectively. All of the severe storms took place in their coverage area in northwest Iowa. Total damage from the tornado outbreak amounted to at least $16.6 million in damage.

Confirmed tornadoes by Enhanced Fujita rating
EFU	EF0	EF1	EF2	EF3	EF4	EF5	Total
5	27	55	33	0	0	0	120

=== Confirmed tornadoes ===
List of confirmed tornadoes – Wednesday, December 15, 2021 (Note: All dates are based on the local time zone where the tornado touched down; however, all times are in Coordinated Universal Time for consistency.)
EF#	Location	County / Parish	State	Start Coord.	Time (UTC)	Path length	Max width
EF0	N of Minden to SW of Gibbon	Kearney, Buffalo	NE	40.5831°N 98.9391°W	19:27–19:38	11.02 mi (17.73 km)	150 yd (140 m)
EF0	Center irrigation pivots were overturned, a couple of power poles were damaged, and the metal roof of a building at a nature preserve was peeled back; a wind gust of 83 mph (134 km/h) was measured there.						
EF0	S of Campbell to SW of Roseland	Franklin, Webster, Adams	NE	40.2676°N 98.7285°W	19:29–19:41	13.45 mi (21.65 km)	100 yd (91 m)
EF0	A building, an irrigation pivot, and some power poles were damaged in Webster County. A home suffered minor damage and several irrigation pivots were tipped over in Adams County.						
EF0	E of Lowell	Kearney, Buffalo	NE	40.6563°N 98.8151°W	19:33–19:41	7.13 mi (11.47 km)	120 yd (110 m)
EF0	A garage was destroyed, while center irrigation pivots and trees were damaged.						
EF1	WSW of Blue Hill to W of Glenvil	Webster, Adams	NE	40.3214°N 98.5025°W	19:44–19:56	14.84 mi (23.88 km)	180 yd (160 m)
EF1	Some irrigation pipe was strewn into a tree line, and trees were damaged west of Blue Hill. Several power poles were snapped southeast of Ayr.						
EF1	NNE of Juniata to S of Doniphan	Adams, Hall	NE	40.6551°N 98.4578°W	19:53–20:01	8.58 mi (13.81 km)	150 yd (140 m)
EF1	One home suffered a partial roof collapse, an outbuilding collapsed, and several irrigation pivots were overturned.						
EF0	SSW of Trumbull to SW of Giltner	Adams, Clay, Hamilton	NE	40.6662°N 98.2789°W	20:03–20:09	7.17 mi (11.54 km)	60 yd (55 m)
EF0	A horse barn and several irrigation pivots were damaged, and a tree was snapped.						
EF1	SSE of Giltner to Aurora	Hamilton	NE	40.724°N 98.1115°W	20:11–20:19	12.9 mi (20.8 km)	400 yd (370 m)
EF1	Several power poles were snapped, and numerous irrigation pivots were damaged along the path. Metal cladding was peeled off of storage buildings near the Hamilton County Fairgrounds at the south edge of Aurora.						
EF1	ESE of Marquette to N of Polk	Hamilton, Polk	NE	40.9688°N 97.9153°W	20:26–20:37	12 mi (19 km)	400 yd (370 m)
EF1	A hog facility was heavily damaged, and power poles were snapped. A large metal building was destroyed just before the tornado dissipated north of Polk.						
EF1	ESE of Polk to NW of Stromsburg	Polk	NE	41.061°N 97.7318°W	20:35–20:43	7.54 mi (12.13 km)	350 yd (320 m)
EF1	Multiple stretches of power poles were snapped, and several irrigation pivots were overturned along the path.						
EF1	Platte Center	Platte	NE	41.53°N 97.49°W	21:03–21:04	0.79 mi (1.27 km)	30 yd (27 m)
EF1	This tornado caused damage in Platte Center, where a large metal and wood-frame building collapsed, a house lost most of its roof, a garage was damaged, and trees were downed. Two sections of an irrigation pivot were tipped over outside of town.						
EF2	Columbus	Platte	NE	41.44°N 97.38°W	21:04–21:06	2.72 mi (4.38 km)	50 yd (46 m)
EF2	A house in Columbus had its attached garage and entire roof ripped off as a result of this small, but strong and fast-moving tornado. Many other homes sustained minor to moderate roof and siding damage in town. Power poles were snapped, and trees were damaged as well. Two people were injured.						
EF2	SE of Dorchester to ESE of Malcolm	Saline, Seward, Lancaster	NE	40.62°N 97.07°W	21:11–21:29	23.74 mi (38.21 km)	70 yd (64 m)
EF2	The top half of a 100-year-old barn was torn off and destroyed, and the structure itself was pulled from its rebar attachment to the foundation. Numerous irrigation pivots were overturned, and outbuildings, grain bins, power poles, and trees were damaged.						
EF1	Howells	Colfax	NE	41.72°N 97.0°W	21:27–21:28	1.5 mi (2.4 km)	30 yd (27 m)
EF1	An intermittent tornado damaged a building at a feed and seed business in Howells, caused roof damage to a house, and downed numerous trees.						
EF2	NNE of Howells	Cuming	NE	41.77°N 96.98°W	21:31–21:36	6.25 mi (10.06 km)	100 yd (91 m)
EF2	A strong tornado impacted numerous livestock barns, many of which had large sections of their roofs removed. One shed was blown 100 yards (91 m) at a farm, while two other sheds, one of which was larger and newly constructed, were demolished. Yet another shed and a house sustained minor roof and siding damage, while trees and five power poles were snapped.						
EF1	W of West Point	Cuming	NE	41.78°N 96.81°W	21:37–21:38	4.85 mi (7.81 km)	50 yd (46 m)
EF1	Power poles were snapped, and a shed was damaged.						
EF1	W of West Point	Cuming	NE	41.82°N 96.84°W	21:37–21:38	1.82 mi (2.93 km)	50 yd (46 m)
EF1	Five wooden power poles were snapped and trees were damaged.						
EF1	SSE of Beemer	Cuming	NE	41.89°N 96.79°W	21:41–21:42	0.36 mi (0.58 km)	50 yd (46 m)
EF1	A 40–60-foot (12–18 m) shed was destroyed, and a farm gravity wagon was moved about 100 yards (91 m). Trees were damaged, and a house sustained minor roof damage.						
EF1	E of Ceresco to NNW of Yutan	Saunders	NE	41.06°N 96.56°W	21:41–21:54	16.6 mi (26.7 km)	100 yd (91 m)
EF1	Several barns and outbuildings were damaged, some of which were completely destroyed. Several pivot irrigation systems was overturned, and several wooden power poles were snapped. Several buildings on the University of Nebraska Farm sustained damage. The tornado was accompanied by significant downburst winds on its eastern flank.						
EF2	ESE of Beemer to SSE of Pender	Cuming	NE	41.91°N 96.75°W	21:44–21:54	11.22 mi (18.06 km)	200 yd (180 m)
EF2	Several barns, some of which were large and well-built, were destroyed. Numerous power poles were snapped, and trees were damaged.						
EF1	N of Ithaca	Saunders	NE	41.18°N 96.55°W	21:46–21:47	0.72 mi (1.16 km)	100 yd (91 m)
EF1	Several outbuildings and a grain bin sustained major damage. A cattle feeder secured to the ground by concrete posts was ripped from its anchors and thrown 250 feet (76 m). Trees were also damaged.						
EF1	SW of Bancroft to NNW of Rosalie	Cuming, Thurston	NE	41.98°N 96.61°W	21:51–21:59	11.24 mi (18.09 km)	20 yd (18 m)
EF1	Outbuildings were damaged, shingles were ripped off the roof of a house, a windmill was collapsed, and large trees were snapped.						
EF2	W of Avoca	Otoe, Cass	NE	40.78°N 96.16°W	21:55–21:59	3.3 mi (5.3 km)	20 yd (18 m)
EF2	A large shed was destroyed, while vehicles and farm equipment sustained substantial damage, including a hay baler that was rolled into the side of an outbuilding. A tree limb was found speared into the ground.						
EF1	NW of Nebraska City	Otoe	NE	40.75°N 95.93°W	22:05–22:06	0.1 mi (0.16 km)	200 yd (180 m)
EF1	Power poles were snapped by this brief tornado.						
EF1	ENE of Summerfield	Pawnee	NE	40.04°N 96.25°W	22:05–22:06	0.18 mi (0.29 km)	20 yd (18 m)
EF1	An outbuilding was destroyed.						
EF2	NE of Nehawka	Cass	NE	40.86°N 95.95°W	22:06–22:09	3.59 mi (5.78 km)	150 yd (140 m)
EF2	A home was unroofed and moved slightly off its foundation. A roof of a garage was uplifted and displaced, and a farm outbuilding was destroyed. Power poles and trees were damaged.						
EF0	W of Du Bois	Pawnee	NE	40.02°N 96.01°W	22:06–22:08	2.18 mi (3.51 km)	20 yd (18 m)
EF0	Half of a large outbuilding was destroyed.						
EF1	E of Pawnee City	Pawnee	NE	40.12°N 96.09°W	22:07–22:08	0.8 mi (1.3 km)	100 yd (91 m)
EF1	Several outbuildings were destroyed, and a house had its wrap-around porch removed.						
EF2	E of Murray	Cass	NE	40.92°N 95.88°W	22:09–22:11	2.6 mi (4.2 km)	200 yd (180 m)
EF2	A house had its roof torn off, while another house had its extension destroyed. Trees were snapped or uprooted along the path, an irrigation pivot was flipped, a horse trailer was rolled, and one horse was killed.						
EF1	WNW of Tabor to NW of Malvern	Mills	IA	40.92°N 95.75°W	22:14–22:23	9.97 mi (16.05 km)	100 yd (91 m)
EF1	A metal outbuilding and two sheds were destroyed. Numerous houses and other outbuildings were damaged, trees were downed, and numerous power poles were snapped.						
EFU	SW of Salix	Woodbury	IA	42.288°N 96.304°W	22:15–22:16	0.8 mi (1.3 km)	20 yd (18 m)
EFU	A brief tornado touched down in an open field, causing no damage.						
EF0	SSW of Council Bluffs	Pottawattamie	IA	41.19°N 95.89°W	22:16–22:17	0.9 mi (1.4 km)	30 yd (27 m)
EF0	Minor tree damage occurred in an open area of the Missouri River bottom.						
EF1	E of Sergeant Bluff	Woodbury	IA	42.366°N 96.302°W	22:20–22:24	4.56 mi (7.34 km)	75 yd (69 m)
EF1	Four farmsteads were struck by the tornado, resulting in damage to several outbuildings.						
EF2	W of Weston	Pottawattamie	IA	41.31°N 95.77°W	22:24–22:27	2.3 mi (3.7 km)	50 yd (46 m)
EF2	A house had most of its roof removed, and several other homes were damaged to a lesser degree. Trees were damaged, outbuildings were destroyed, and power poles were snapped as well.						
EF2	S of Lawton to NW of Moville	Woodbury	IA	42.429°N 96.182°W	22:25–22:32	8.44 mi (13.58 km)	100 yd (91 m)
EF2	A home was unroofed, and several farmsteads sustained considerable damage from this tornado, while some other residences had shingles torn off. Two metal truss transmission towers collapsed along US 20 east of Lawton.						
EF1	S of Henderson	Mills	IA	41.08°N 95.44°W	22:31–22:32	0.63 mi (1.01 km)	50 yd (46 m)
EF1	A metal building was destroyed, with debris from the roof being scattered to the northeast. Two trucks inside were flipped, and several wooden power poles were snapped as well.						
EF2	E of Underwood to NNE of Neola	Pottawattamie	IA	41.39°N 95.64°W	22:31–22:36	6.68 mi (10.75 km)	75 yd (69 m)
EF2	One house sustained loss of its roof and had an exterior wall blown out, and a nearby garage was moved off its foundation. Large metal buildings sustained substantial damage at the southeast edge of Neola, two of which were destroyed. At least ten mature trees were uprooted as well.						
EF1	E of Macedonia to E of Oakland	Pottawattamie	IA	41.18°N 95.36°W	22:34–22:42	9.57 mi (15.40 km)	50 yd (46 m)
EF1	Trees, outbuildings, and homes were damaged along the path.						
EF1	ENE of Moville to NE of Kingsley	Woodbury, Plymouth	IA	42.505°N 95.992°W	22:35–22:43	8 mi (13 km)	75 yd (69 m)
EF1	The roof of one barn collapsed, while the roof of another was ripped off. One garage was destroyed and a second was collapsed. Trees and outbuildings were damaged at two additional farmsteads.						
EF1	WSW of Battle Creek to N of Ida Grove	Ida	IA	42.293°N 95.667°W	22:42–22:51	13 mi (21 km)	75 yd (69 m)
EF1	Several outbuildings were damaged or destroyed, a home lost shingles, power poles were snapped, and several trees were damaged.						
EFU	SW of Kenwood	Crawford	IA	41.9551°N 95.5749°W	22:48–22:51	4.39 mi (7.07 km)	50 yd (46 m)
EFU	A tornado was confirmed via a debris signature on radar, but caused no known damage.						
EF2	SW of Atlantic to ENE of Hamlin	Cass, Audubon	IA	41.333°N 95.107°W	22:49–23:09	27.11 mi (43.63 km)	100 yd (91 m)
EF2	Three metal truss transmission towers were blown over, while homes, outbuildings, power poles, and trees were damaged.						
EF1	NW of Galva to WSW of Alta	Ida, Cherokee, Buena Vista	IA	42.526°N 95.435°W	22:58–23:06	11.1 mi (17.9 km)	75 yd (69 m)
EF1	A home and at least four farmsteads were damaged, and numerous trees were snapped or uprooted.						
EF1	SSW of Aurelia to S of Peterson	Cherokee, Buena Vista	IA	42.635°N 95.489°W	22:59–23:12	18.1 mi (29.1 km)	250 yd (230 m)
EF1	A building at a hog farm was collapsed, resulting in the deaths of 13 hogs. The roofs and siding of homes and farm outbuildings were damaged. A grain elevator in Aurelia was damaged, several empty rail cars were overturned in town, power poles were downed, and trees were snapped.						
EF1	SSE of Brayton to NE of Exira	Cass, Audubon	IA	41.4876°N 94.8961°W	23:00–23:09	11.44 mi (18.41 km)	80 yd (73 m)
EF1	A garage was destroyed, a semi-truck was flipped, and trees were damaged.						
EF1	Larrabee to SE of Sutherland	Cherokee, O'Brien	IA	42.858°N 95.541°W	23:05–23:11	7.69 mi (12.38 km)	100 yd (91 m)
EF1	An outbuilding, machine shed, chicken barn, and four silos were destroyed. One barn, and the roof of a second barn were damaged. Trees were snapped as well.						
EF1	SW of Guthrie Center to NNE of Wichita	Guthrie	IA	41.6206°N 94.6906°W	23:10–23:18	11.45 mi (18.43 km)	70 yd (64 m)
EF1	Two farm buildings were destroyed, while houses and outbuildings were damaged as well.						
EF2	W of Breda to SW of Lytton	Carroll, Sac	IA	42.1842°N 95.0694°W	23:13–23:26	17.6 mi (28.3 km)	100 yd (91 m)
EF2	Power poles were snapped, an outbuilding was destroyed, and several other outbuildings and trees were damaged.						
EF2	SW of Wichita to NNE of Bayard	Guthrie, Greene	IA	41.6998°N 94.7044°W	23:14–23:28	19.67 mi (31.66 km)	100 yd (91 m)
EF2	The roof of a house was ripped off, and a garage and several grain bins were destroyed. Several large power poles were snapped, while trees and outbuildings were damaged.						
EF2	SE of Sioux Rapids	Buena Vista	IA	42.834°N 95.171°W	23:18–23:22	4.77 mi (7.68 km)	100 yd (91 m)
EF2	Power poles and trees were snapped along the path, and outbuildings were damaged at two farmsteads.						
EF1	NNE of Willey to E of Lidderdale	Carroll	IA	42.0088°N 94.8095°W	23:19–23:26	9.65 mi (15.53 km)	80 yd (73 m)
EF1	Homes and outbuildings were damaged along the path.						
EF2	N of Guthrie Center to W of Bagley to N of Dana	Guthrie, Greene	IA	41.7522°N 94.4961°W	23:21–23:42	29.99 mi (48.26 km)	300 yd (270 m)
EF2	Utility poles were snapped, several outbuildings were destroyed, and both trees and homes sustained damage. A semi-truck was overturned as well.						
EF2	E of Bagley to Grand Junction to NE of Dana	Guthrie, Greene	IA	41.8432°N 94.4015°W	23:27–23:45	23.4 mi (37.7 km)	150 yd (140 m)
EF2	Power poles were damaged or snapped, and an industrial windmill was toppled to the ground. A confinement building was destroyed, and houses sustained minor damage.						
EF2	SW of Jefferson	Greene	IA	41.943°N 94.5058°W	23:29–23:33	5.49 mi (8.84 km)	100 yd (91 m)
EF2	A series of high-voltage utility dual pole towers were snapped. An outbuilding was demolished and a confinement building was damaged. Additional utility poles were snapped elsewhere along the path.						
EF2	W of Jefferson	Greene	IA	41.9863°N 94.4796°W	23:32–23:36	5.83 mi (9.38 km)	100 yd (91 m)
EF2	Several large single pole utility poles were toppled. Additional high voltage poles were severely leaned over, and minor tree and house damage occurred.						
EF2	S of Churdan	Greene	IA	42.081°N 94.4866°W	23:34–23:36	2.74 mi (4.41 km)	70 yd (64 m)
EF2	Power poles were snapped along the path.						
EFU	E of Lake City	Calhoun	IA	42.2525°N 94.6317°W	23:34–23:35	1.33 mi (2.14 km)	40 yd (37 m)
EFU	A brief tornado was confirmed via high-resolution satellite imagery. No damage was observed.						
EF1	SSW of Lohrville to NE of Knierim	Calhoun	IA	42.2211°N 94.583°W	23:35–23:49	19.01 mi (30.59 km)	100 yd (91 m)
EF1	A tornado caused damage to trees, homes, and outbuildings.						
EF1	NE of Fostoria	Dickinson	IA	43.265°N 95.088°W	23:39–23:43	3.96 mi (6.37 km)	50 yd (46 m)
EF1	Power poles were damaged, and a house lost a portion of its roof.						
EF2	E of Grand Junction to E of Dayton	Greene, Boone, Webster	IA	42.0405°N 94.2019°W	23:39–23:52	17.69 mi (28.47 km)	125 yd (114 m)
EF2	Eight utility poles were snapped, and trees were damaged as well.						
EF2	NE of Lohrville to NNE of Barnum	Calhoun, Webster	IA	42.2902°N 94.476°W	23:40–23:54	17.97 mi (28.92 km)	80 yd (73 m)
EF2	Large utility poles were snapped, and trees and barns were damaged. Minor damage occurred to houses as well.						
EF1	NE of Ayrshire to S of Graettinger	Palo Alto	IA	43.0586°N 94.8102°W	23:41–23:50	11.16 mi (17.96 km)	90 yd (82 m)
EF1	Several trees, power poles, and the roof of an outbuilding were damaged.						
EF2	SW of Paton to NW of Lehigh	Greene, Webster	IA	42.1489°N 94.282°W	23:42–23:57	18.83 mi (30.30 km)	150 yd (140 m)
EF2	An old shed was blown apart, and a few more well-built outbuildings were destroyed too. Several large utility poles were also snapped.						
EFU	SE of Palmer	Pocahontas	IA	42.5797°N 94.5775°W	23:43–23:44	1.04 mi (1.67 km)	40 yd (37 m)
EFU	A tornado was confirmed using high-resolution satellite imagery. No damage was observed.						
EF2	S of Pilot Mound to NW of Stanhope	Boone, Webster, Hamilton	IA	42.1272°N 94.0157°W	23:49–00:01	16.25 mi (26.15 km)	125 yd (114 m)
EF2	Multiple large utility poles were snapped, and an outbuilding was damaged.						
EFU	SW of Gilmore City to SSW of Bradgate	Pocahontas, Humboldt	IA	42.6852°N 94.5062°W	23:50–23:56	7.1 mi (11.4 km)	80 yd (73 m)
EFU	A tornado was confirmed using high-resolution satellite imagery. No damage was observed.						
EF2	SSW of Stratford to W of Kamrar	Webster, Hamilton	IA	42.2374°N 93.9463°W	23:55–00:05	12.1 mi (19.5 km)	100 yd (91 m)
EF2	An outbuilding was completely destroyed, while additional outbuildings and trees were damaged.						
EF1	N of Rutland	Humboldt	IA	42.7841°N 94.3105°W	23:58–00:01	4.23 mi (6.81 km)	80 yd (73 m)
EF1	Several large utility poles were snapped by this tornado.						
EF2	W of Duncombe	Webster	IA	42.4239°N 94.0578°W	00:00–00:04	5.55 mi (8.93 km)	80 yd (73 m)
EF2	Several power poles were snapped, and an outbuilding was destroyed.						
EF0	S of Stanhope to NW of Jewell	Hamilton	IA	42.2514°N 93.8019°W	00:01–00:08	8.79 mi (14.15 km)	70 yd (64 m)
EF0	Trees and outbuildings sustained minor damage.						
EF0	ENE of Lehigh to WNW of Webster City	Webster, Hamilton	IA	42.3813°N 93.9473°W	00:01–00:07	7.63 mi (12.28 km)	80 yd (73 m)
EF0	An industrial plant sustained minor damage.						
EF2	W of Galt	Wright	IA	42.6557°N 93.6664°W	00:19–00:23	5.91 mi (9.51 km)	70 yd (64 m)
EF2	An animal confinement building and outbuildings were completely destroyed.						
EF2	N of Rowan to NW of Thornton	Wright, Franklin, Cerro Gordo	IA	42.7555°N 93.5566°W	00:25–00:38	16.69 mi (26.86 km)	100 yd (91 m)
EF2	Several farmsteads were impacted, where a few outbuildings were demolished. Trees were damaged along the path as well.						
EF1	N of Alden to NE of Bradford	Hardin, Franklin	IA	42.5306°N 93.3697°W	00:26–00:35	12.96 mi (20.86 km)	125 yd (114 m)
EF1	Tree trunks were snapped along the path of this tornado.						
EF1	SSW of Iowa Falls to W of Dumont	Hardin, Franklin	IA	42.482°N 93.2841°W	00:27–00:43	22.16 mi (35.66 km)	140 yd (130 m)
EF1	A tornado caused moderate damage to homes, trees, and outbuildings.						
EF0	E of Kanawha	Wright, Hancock	IA	42.8998°N 93.7488°W	00:28–00:32	5.23 mi (8.42 km)	60 yd (55 m)
EF0	Minor tree damage was observed along the path.						
EF1	SW of Chapin to E of Sheffield	Franklin	IA	42.8225°N 93.2513°W	00:38–00:43	6.01 mi (9.67 km)	80 yd (73 m)
EF1	An outbuilding on the property of a business was largely destroyed, and a private weather station recorded a wind gust of 108 mph (174 km/h).						
EF2	SSW of Hansell to NW of Dumont	Franklin	IA	42.7153°N 93.114°W	00:40–00:46	7.49 mi (12.05 km)	90 yd (82 m)
EF2	Extensive outbuilding damage occurred at two farmsteads, and a home had a considerable amount of roofing and siding ripped off at one of them. Trees and power poles were also damaged.						
EF0	E of Rockwell	Cerro Gordo	IA	42.9664°N 93.1375°W	00:44–00:46	2.86 mi (4.60 km)	40 yd (37 m)
EF0	Trees were damaged by this small, weak tornado.						
EF1	WNW of Scarville	Winnebago (IA), Faribault (MN)	IA, MN	43.4643°N 93.6889°W	00:48–00:51	2.85 mi (4.59 km)	90 yd (82 m)
EF1	A barn lost its roof, and several trees were downed.						
EF1	W of Greene	Butler, Floyd	IA	42.8866°N 92.9117°W	00:53–00:57	4.17 mi (6.71 km)	100 yd (91 m)
EF1	Trees were damaged along the path.						
EF0	NE of Rock Falls	Cerro Gordo	IA	43.2076°N 93.0698°W	00:54–00:57	3.54 mi (5.70 km)	60 yd (55 m)
EF0	Only minor tree damage occurred along the path of this tornado.						
EF0	WSW of Kensett to NE of Northwood	Worth	IA	43.3432°N 93.2481°W	00:58–01:05	9.11 mi (14.66 km)	80 yd (73 m)
EF0	A weak tornado damaged a few outbuildings.						
EF1	SSW of Alden	Freeborn	MN	43.6155°N 93.6294°W	00:58–01:01	3.61 mi (5.81 km)	75 yd (69 m)
EF1	Trees and utility poles were damaged along the path.						
EF1	NNE of Marble Rock to W of Charles City	Floyd	IA	42.9847°N 92.8534°W	00:59–01:04	6.7 mi (10.8 km)	80 yd (73 m)
EF1	Numerous farmsteads were struck by this tornado, where silos, sheds, barns, and outbuildings were damaged or destroyed, and a few homes were also damaged. Trees and power lines were downed as well.						
EF0	SE of Newton	Jasper	IA	41.6317°N 93.0505°W	01:01–01:06	6.27 mi (10.09 km)	100 yd (91 m)
EF0	The tornado tracked across the Newton Municipal Airport and Iowa Speedway before dissipating east of town. Several structures at the airport had minor damage.						
EF1	ENE of Alden	Freeborn	MN	43.6725°N 93.5453°W	01:03–01:05	1.64 mi (2.64 km)	25 yd (23 m)
EF1	Trees and a farm outbuilding were damaged.						
EF1	Rudd	Floyd	IA	43.1117°N 92.925°W	01:06–01:07	1.79 mi (2.88 km)	65 yd (59 m)
EF1	Power lines were toppled, trees were damaged, and some homes in town had their roofs blown off as a result of this high-end EF1 tornado. The local library also lost its roof, while a church sustained significant damage.						
EF0	SE of London, MN	Worth (IA), Freeborn (MN), Mower (MN)	IA, MN	43.4877°N 93.0627°W	01:09–01:12	2.63 mi (4.23 km)	50 yd (46 m)
EF0	An empty silo was destroyed, and trees were downed.						
EF0	SSW of Glenville	Freeborn	MN	43.5323°N 93.3052°W	01:10–01:13	2.62 mi (4.22 km)	100 yd (91 m)
EF0	Trees were downed, farm buildings were damaged, and hay bales were tossed across a road.						
EF1	SE of Glenville to NNE of Myrtle	Freeborn	MN	43.5373°N 93.1981°W	01:10–01:15	6.34 mi (10.20 km)	100 yd (91 m)
EF1	Seven outbuildings were badly damaged or destroyed at a farm. A house had multiple windows blown out, and many shingles were ripped off the roof of a second house. A machine shed had several of its support pillars ripped out of the ground.						
EF1	SSW of London to E of Myrtle	Freeborn	MN	43.508°N 93.0741°W	01:11–01:15	4.26 mi (6.86 km)	75 yd (69 m)
EF1	A machine shed was destroyed, a nearly full grain bin was dented, and a house had part of its roof ripped off. Outbuildings were damaged, two irrigation pivots were overturned, and trees were downed.						
EF2	Hartland	Freeborn	MN	43.7976°N 93.4927°W	01:11–01:13	2.17 mi (3.49 km)	55 yd (50 m)
EF2	Numerous buildings, trees, and utility poles suffered damage as a strong and fast-moving tornado moved through Hartland. The most severe damage occurred in the downtown area, where a couple of brick buildings were significantly damaged, windows were shattered, and streets were littered with debris. A light pole was broken, and a metal building had an exterior wall blown out as well. Homes in town were damaged, and a large RV camper was overturned.						
EF1	NE of Bassett	Chickasaw	IA	43.0974°N 92.483°W	01:15–01:18	3.99 mi (6.42 km)	180 yd (160 m)
EF1	Trees and farm outbuildings were damaged.						
EF0	S of Hayward to SSE of Hollandale	Freeborn	MN	43.6113°N 93.2505°W	01:15–01:21	6.71 mi (10.80 km)	100 yd (91 m)
EF0	The roofs of several outbuildings and a turkey barn were partially ripped off. A silo was dented, and trees were downed onto a number of sheds and vehicles.						
EF0	SW of Alta Vista to SE of Elma	Chickasaw, Howard	IA	43.1713°N 92.489°W	01:17–01:22	4.96 mi (7.98 km)	50 yd (46 m)
EF0	Farm equipment and trees were damaged.						
EF0	NE of Elma	Howard	IA	43.2595°N 92.3979°W	01:23–01:28	5.91 mi (9.51 km)	45 yd (41 m)
EF0	Numerous outbuildings and farms were damaged.						
EF0	W of Cresco	Howard	IA	43.3085°N 92.2811°W	01:29–01:32	4.44 mi (7.15 km)	45 yd (41 m)
EF0	Trees and several outbuildings were damaged, and the roof of a hog confinement building was ripped off.						
EF0	W of Cresco	Howard	IA	43.3203°N 92.2087°W	01:31–01:35	4.6 mi (7.4 km)	90 yd (82 m)
EF0	Falling trees largely destroyed one house and caused roof and window damage to a second. Two metal outbuildings were demolished and a third was damaged.						
EF0	N of Blooming Prairie	Steele	MN	43.894°N 93.0592°W	01:33–01:37	6.42 mi (10.33 km)	75 yd (69 m)
EF0	An irrigation system was overturned, farm outbuildings were damaged, a small shed was tossed, and trees were downed.						
EF1	SW of Hamilton to NE of Racine	Mower	MN	43.7419°N 92.4836°W	01:37–01:40	3.32 mi (5.34 km)	85 yd (78 m)
EF1	The roof of a home was blown off, and several outbuildings and tree stands were damaged.						
EF0	N of Spring Valley to SE of Pleasant Grove	Fillmore	MN	43.7762°N 92.37°W	01:42–01:46	4.6 mi (7.4 km)	80 yd (73 m)
EF0	Several sheds, outbuildings and trees were damaged.						
EF0	Preston	Fillmore	MN	43.6699°N 92.0805°W	01:48–01:49	0.51 mi (0.82 km)	40 yd (37 m)
EF0	Cars and sheds were damaged, the city hall and a fire department building in town sustained roof damage, and numerous trees were snapped.						
EF1	NE of Preston	Fillmore	MN	43.6878°N 92.0736°W	01:51–01:53	1.77 mi (2.85 km)	75 yd (69 m)
EF1	Extensive damage occurred to farm buildings, and numerous trees were damaged.						
EF1	N of West Concord to W of Roscoe	Dodge, Goodhue	MN	44.1934°N 92.9007°W	01:50–01:54	4.33 mi (6.97 km)	75 yd (69 m)
EF1	The top half of a barn was destroyed, and pine trees were snapped.						
EF1	SE of Kenyon	Goodhue	MN	44.2085°N 92.9385°W	01:51–01:55	4.39 mi (7.07 km)	75 yd (69 m)
EF1	Farm buildings were destroyed, and several trees were snapped.						
EF1	E of Arendahl	Fillmore	MN	43.8184°N 91.9031°W	02:01–02:02	1.19 mi (1.92 km)	250 yd (230 m)
EF1	A grove of trees was damaged by this tornado.						
EF1	S of Rushford	Fillmore	MN	43.7464°N 91.7757°W	02:02–02:04	2.35 mi (3.78 km)	75 yd (69 m)
EF1	Trees and some farm outbuildings were damaged.						
EF1	E of Plainview	Wabasha	MN	44.1342°N 92.1343°W	02:03–02:07	4.03 mi (6.49 km)	40 yd (37 m)
EF1	Numerous trees and several farm buildings were damaged.						
EF1	NW of Houston	Houston	MN	43.7582°N 91.6525°W	02:06–02:11	7.31 mi (11.76 km)	250 yd (230 m)
EF1	Numerous tree stands and farm outbuildings were damaged, and shingles were ripped off of a house.						
EF0	N of Wyattville	Winona	MN	43.9605°N 91.7908°W	02:10–02:11	0.63 mi (1.01 km)	40 yd (37 m)
EF0	Several outbuildings, a garage, and trees were damaged.						
EF1	Homer, MN	Winona (MN), Trempealeau (WI)	MN, WI	43.9965°N 91.58°W	02:17–02:21	4.85 mi (7.81 km)	40 yd (37 m)
EF1	This tornado struck Homer, where tree damage occurred. A few outbuildings and trees were damaged elsewhere.						
EF0	Trempealeau	Trempealeau	WI	44.0059°N 91.4558°W	02:23–02:24	0.74 mi (1.19 km)	25 yd (23 m)
EF0	Homes, outbuildings, trees, and crops sustained minor damage in and around Trempealeau.						
EF1	W of Levis	Trempealeau, Jackson	WI	44.4995°N 91.1829°W	02:53–02:55	2.68 mi (4.31 km)	70 yd (64 m)
EF1	Outbuildings, trees, and one home were damaged.						
EF0	W of Fairchild to E of Augusta	Eau Claire	WI	44.6017°N 91.0761°W	03:00–03:06	6.71 mi (10.80 km)	75 yd (69 m)
EF0	Two sheds suffered partial roof loss, and numerous trees were downed, some of which fell on sheds, homes, and vehicles.						
EF0	E of Chippewa Falls	Chippewa	WI	44.9012°N 91.3039°W	03:02–03:07	5.35 mi (8.61 km)	75 yd (69 m)
EF0	The tornado moved along the east side of Lake Wissota, near Bateman, downing hundreds of trees. Some homes were damaged by falling trees, while others sustained shingle and soffit removal.						
EF2	SW of Hewett	Jackson, Clark	WI	44.5039°N 90.804°W	03:05–03:08	3.13 mi (5.04 km)	250 yd (230 m)
EF2	This strong tornado moved through a large forested area, snapping hundreds of trees in a convergent pattern before it was overcome by downburst winds.						
EF2	W of Neillsville	Clark	WI	44.5110°N 90.7491°W	03:07–03:09	2.8 mi (4.5 km)	250 yd (230 m)
EF2	A small, poorly anchored house was swept off its foundation, and trees and power lines were downed.						
EF2	SE of Boyd to NE of Stanley	Chippewa, Clark	WI	44.901°N 90.9834°W	03:16–03:23	7.41 mi (11.93 km)	50 yd (46 m)
EF2	This tornado initially caused minor tree, roof, and outbuilding damage before it intensified and moved directly through Stanley. Many homes were damaged in town, some severely with roofs and exterior walls ripped off. Garages and metal buildings were completely destroyed, and a large metal trailer was lofted and thrown 250 yards (230 m). Many trees were snapped, power lines were downed, a couple of older brick buildings sustained some collapse of exterior walls, and a few businesses had windows blown out and roofing torn off. Past Stanley, the tornado caused damage to outbuildings and tree limbs outside of town before dissipating.						
EF2	NNE of Neillsville	Clark	WI	44.5975°N 90.5799°W	03:16–03:18	1.13 mi (1.82 km)	50 yd (46 m)
EF2	A brief but strong tornado struck a farm, where a house had much of its roof ripped off, windows were broken, and a barn was shifted off of its foundation. A truck on the property was tossed nearly 100 feet (30 m) away from where it originated. Trees were downed as well.						
EF1	W of Greenwood	Clark	WI	44.7667°N 90.6642°W	03:22–03:23	0.9 mi (1.4 km)	50 yd (46 m)
EF1	A pole shed was destroyed, a power pole was snapped, and trees were damaged. One barn had its roof ripped off while a second sustained roof damage.						

== Non-wind impacts ==
The initial winter storm, unofficially referred to by The Weather Channel (TWC) as Winter Storm Bankston, entered the Western United States on December 13. The storm, being a category 3 atmospheric river event, brought heavy rain and snowfall to the Western United States. Over 8 inches (20 cm) of rain during the storm were recorded on Mount Tamalpais, a mountain in the San Francisco Bay Area, with San Francisco itself receiving around 2 inches (5.1 cm) of rain from the event. Around 60 inches (150 cm) of snow was recorded in Pinecrest, California. The storm caused statewide snowpack in California to increase from 19% of normal to 83% of normal. Portions of Interstate 5 in Northern California and southern Oregon closed partly as a result of this storm. Six Flags Magic Mountain was also shut down on December 14 as a result of the storm.

The storm also brought heavy snowfall to much of the Intermountain West, bringing significant snowfall totals to the metropolitan region of the Wasatch Front. The storm brought a foot of snow to Salt Lake City by the morning of December 15, and higher totals in the Wasatch Mountains, up to 21 inches (53 cm) in Snowbird. The storm caused significant delays along the Wasatch Front, with multiple school districts in the area either delaying or cancelling classes, and 120 to 130 crashes were reported during the storm by the Utah Highway Patrol.

== Aftermath ==
Most of the customers who lost power had power restored the next day. The Kickapoo Valley Reserve asked for assistance in cleaning up tree damage during the storm. Following the derecho, research was put in to determine if this storm, plus the tornado outbreak five days earlier, were connected to climate change. Around half of Iowa was declared a disaster area following the storm. Rudd, Iowa lost water following the storms.

== See also ==
- Weather of 2021
- List of United States tornadoes in December 2021
- List of North American tornadoes and tornado outbreaks
- August 2020 Midwest derecho
- Tornado outbreak of December 10–11, 2021 – Another historic December storm occurring only five days prior in the Southeast United States.
