= Dana, Iowa =

- City
- Location of Dana, Iowa
- Coordinates: 42°06′26″N 94°14′18″W
- Country: USA
- State: Iowa
- County: Greene

Area
  - Total: 0.28 sq mi (0.73 km^{2})
  - Land: 0.28 sq mi (0.73 km^{2})
  - Water: 0 sq mi (0.00 km^{2})
- Elevation: 1,122 ft (342 m)

Population (2020)
  - Total: 38
  - Density: 135.4/sq mi (52.26/km^{2})
- Time zone: UTC-6 (Central (CST))
  - Summer (DST): UTC-5 (CDT)
- ZIP code: 50064
- Area code: 515
- FIPS code: 19-18345
- GNIS feature ID: 2393711
- Website: danaia.gov

Dana is a city in Greene County, Iowa, United States. The population was 38 at the time of the 2020 census.

== History ==
Dana was incorporated as a town in 1907. It is named for Samuel Dana, a pioneer settler.

== Geography ==
According to the United States Census Bureau, the city has a total area of 0.28 square miles (0.73 km^{2}), all land.

== Demographics ==
Historical populations
Year	Pop.	±%
1910	183	—
1920	163	−10.9%
1930	195	+19.6%
1940	153	−21.5%
1950	184	+20.3%
1960	123	−33.2%
1970	118	−4.1%
1980	110	−6.8%
1990	71	−35.5%
2000	84	+18.3%
2010	71	−15.5%
2020	38	−46.5%
Source:"U.S. Census website". United States Census Bureau. and Iowa Data Center; Source: U.S. Decennial Census

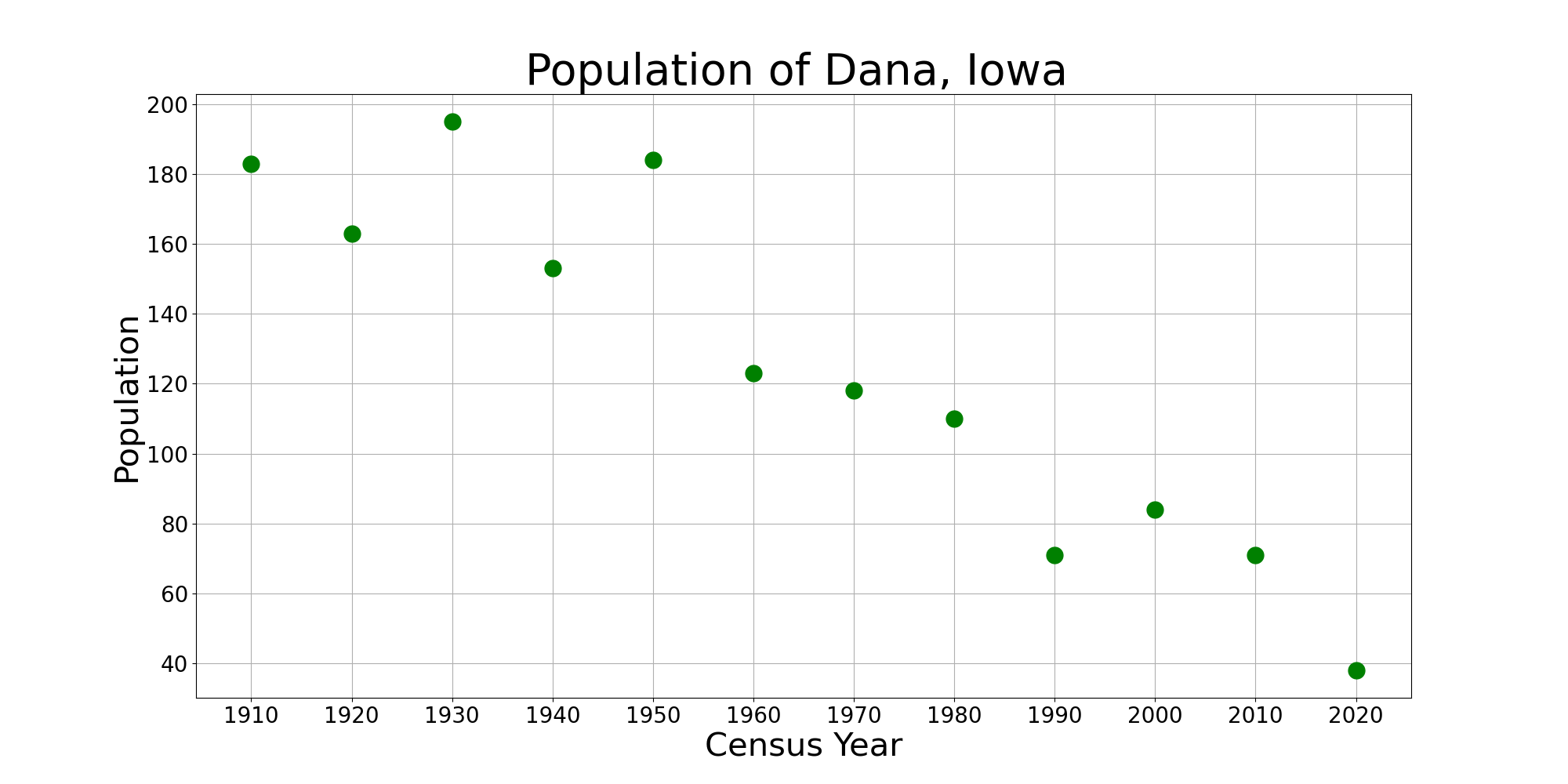
The population of Dana, Iowa from US census data

=== 2020 census ===
As of the census of 2020, there were 38 people, 12 households, and 8 families residing in the city. The population density was 135.4 inhabitants per square mile (52.3/km^{2}). There were 24 housing units at an average density of 85.5 per square mile (33.0/km^{2}). The racial makeup of the city was 84.2% White, 0.0% Black or African American, 0.0% Native American, 0.0% Asian, 0.0% Pacific Islander, 0.0% from other races and 15.8% from two or more races. Hispanic or Latino persons of any race comprised 7.9% of the population.

Of the 12 households, 33.3% of which had children under the age of 18 living with them, 50.0% were married couples living together, 8.3% were cohabitating couples, 0.0% had a female householder with no spouse or partner present and 41.7% had a male householder with no spouse or partner present. 33.3% of all households were non-families. 25.0% of all households were made up of individuals, 0.0% had someone living alone who was 65 years old or older.

The median age in the city was 36.5 years. 23.7% of the residents were under the age of 20; 5.3% were between the ages of 20 and 24; 28.9% were from 25 and 44; 26.3% were from 45 and 64; and 15.8% were 65 years of age or older. The gender makeup of the city was 47.4% male and 52.6% female.

=== 2010 census ===
As of the census of 2010, there were 71 people, 25 households, and 17 families residing in the city. The population density was 253.6 inhabitants per square mile (97.9/km^{2}). There were 32 housing units at an average density of 114.3 per square mile (44.1/km^{2}). The racial makeup of the city was 91.5% White and 8.5% African American. Hispanic or Latino of any race were 2.8% of the population.

There were 25 households, of which 32.0% had children under the age of 18 living with them, 52.0% were married couples living together, 8.0% had a female householder with no husband present, 8.0% had a male householder with no wife present, and 32.0% were non-families. 20.0% of all households were made up of individuals, and 4% had someone living alone who was 65 years of age or older. The average household size was 2.84 and the average family size was 3.00.

The median age in the city was 39.5 years. 29.6% of residents were under the age of 18; 9.9% were between the ages of 18 and 24; 16.8% were from 25 to 44; 35.3% were from 45 to 64; and 8.5% were 65 years of age or older. The gender makeup of the city was 52.1% male and 47.9% female.

=== 2000 census ===
As of the census of 2000, there were 84 people, 29 households, and 20 families residing in the city. The population density was 297.5 inhabitants per square mile (114.9/km^{2}). There were 32 housing units at an average density of 113.3 per square mile (43.7/km^{2}). The racial makeup of the city was 100.00% White. Hispanic or Latino of any race were 5.95% of the population.

There were 29 households, out of which 41.4% had children under the age of 18 living with them, 51.7% were married couples living together, 3.4% had a female householder with no husband present, and 27.6% were non-families. 20.7% of all households were made up of individuals, and 6.9% had someone living alone who was 65 years of age or older. The average household size was 2.90 and the average family size was 3.29.

In the city, the population was spread out, with 31.0% under the age of 18, 11.9% from 18 to 24, 29.8% from 25 to 44, 19.0% from 45 to 64, and 8.3% who were 65 years of age or older. The median age was 31 years. For every 100 females, there were 104.9 males. For every 100 females age 18 and over, there were 114.8 males.

The median income for a household in the city was $33,750, and the median income for a family was $30,625. Males had a median income of $26,250 versus $21,250 for females. The per capita income for the city was $11,199. There were no families and 8.8% of the population living below the poverty line, including no under eighteens and none of those over 64.

== Education ==
Residents are in the Greene County Community School District, which operates Greene County Elementary, Greene County Middle, and Greene County High schools in Jefferson.

The Grand Junction and Dana school districts consolidated in 1959 to form the East Greene Community School District. The Rippey School served as the East Greene district's elementary school, while middle and high school students attended school in Grand Junction. In 2012 elementary grades moved to Grand Junction while secondary students began attending schools operated by the Jefferson–Scranton Community School District. The East Greene and Jefferson–Scranton districts consolidated into the Greene County Community School District on July 1, 2014.
