= Tyler Miller (American football) =

American football player (born 2001)

No. 71 – Denver Broncos
- Position: Offensive tackle
- Roster status: Practice squad

Personal information
- Born: November 5, 2001 (age 25); Scranton, Iowa, U.S.
- Listed height: 6 ft 9 in (2.06 m)
- Listed weight: 335 lb (152 kg)

Career information
- High school: Greene County (Jefferson, Iowa)
- College: Iowa State (2020–2025)
- NFL draft: 2026: undrafted

Career history
- Denver Broncos (2026–present)*
- * Offseason or practice squad member only

Awards and highlights
- Third-team All-Big 12 (2025)
- Stats at Pro Football Reference

Tyler J. Miller (born November 5, 2001) is an American professional football offensive tackle for the Denver Broncos of the National Football League (NFL). He played college football for the Iowa State Cyclones and was signed by the Broncos as an undrafted free agent in 2026.

== Early life ==
Playing football at left tackle and on the defensive line for Greene County High School in Jefferson, Iowa, Miller was a two-time all-district and all-state selection. As a senior, his blocking helped the team record over 1,000 yards rushing and over 2,000 yards passing while he simultaneously recorded 21 tackles and five tackles-for-loss as the team achieved a 9–2 record. He was also a member of the varsity basketball team.

Miller drew significant interest as a three-star recruit coming out of high school due to his dominant run blocking and imposing frame, standing at six feet and nine inches tall and weighing in at 285 pounds.

== College career ==
Entering college, Miller committed to his local Iowa State University. He redshirted his entire freshman year in 2020, during the height of the COVID-19 pandemic. In 2021, he made his college debut, playing in four games primarily as a special teamer. In, 2022 he saw an increased role as a fixture at right tackle, playing in all 12 games and starting 10 of them. His playing time grew further in both 2023 and 2024, with him starting in all 13 games each season. During the 2025 season, Miller started in all 12 games, with his run blocking helping both of the Cyclones' top rushers average over five yards per carry. His 50 total career starts were the second-most by a player in school history. Following the standout season, Miller was named to the 2025 All-Big 12 third team. After 2025, Miller ran out of college eligibility years, and subsequently declared for the NFL draft.

== Professional career ==
Pre-draft measurables
Height	Weight	Arm length	Hand span	Wingspan	40-yard dash	10-yard split	20-yard split	Vertical jump	Broad jump	Bench press
6 ft 8 3/4 in (2.05 m)	321 lb (146 kg)	34 1/8 in (0.87 m)	10 1/8 in (0.26 m)	6 ft 10 3/8 in (2.09 m)	5.23 s	1.84 s	3.05 s	29.5 in (0.75 m)	9 ft 9 in (2.97 m)	27 reps
All values from Pro Day

Prior to the 2026 NFL draft, Miller visited with multiple NFL teams, including a local visit with the Minnesota Vikings and a top-30 visit with the Denver Broncos.

=== Denver Broncos ===
After going unselected in the 2026 draft, Miller signed with the Denver Broncos as an undrafted free agent on May 8, 2026. On August 30, he was waived by the Broncos as a part of final roster cuts; he was re-signed to the team's practice squad the next day.

== Personal life ==
In 2021, Miller and his then-girlfriend Jaislynn Happe had an unexpected pregnancy that led to him contemplating retiring from football in order to take care of his new son, Tate. Miller's coach at Iowa State, Matt Campbell, in addition to other members of the Cyclones staff supported Miller during this difficult time. Miller and Happe have since married and had another son, Teddy.
