= Scranton, Iowa =

- City
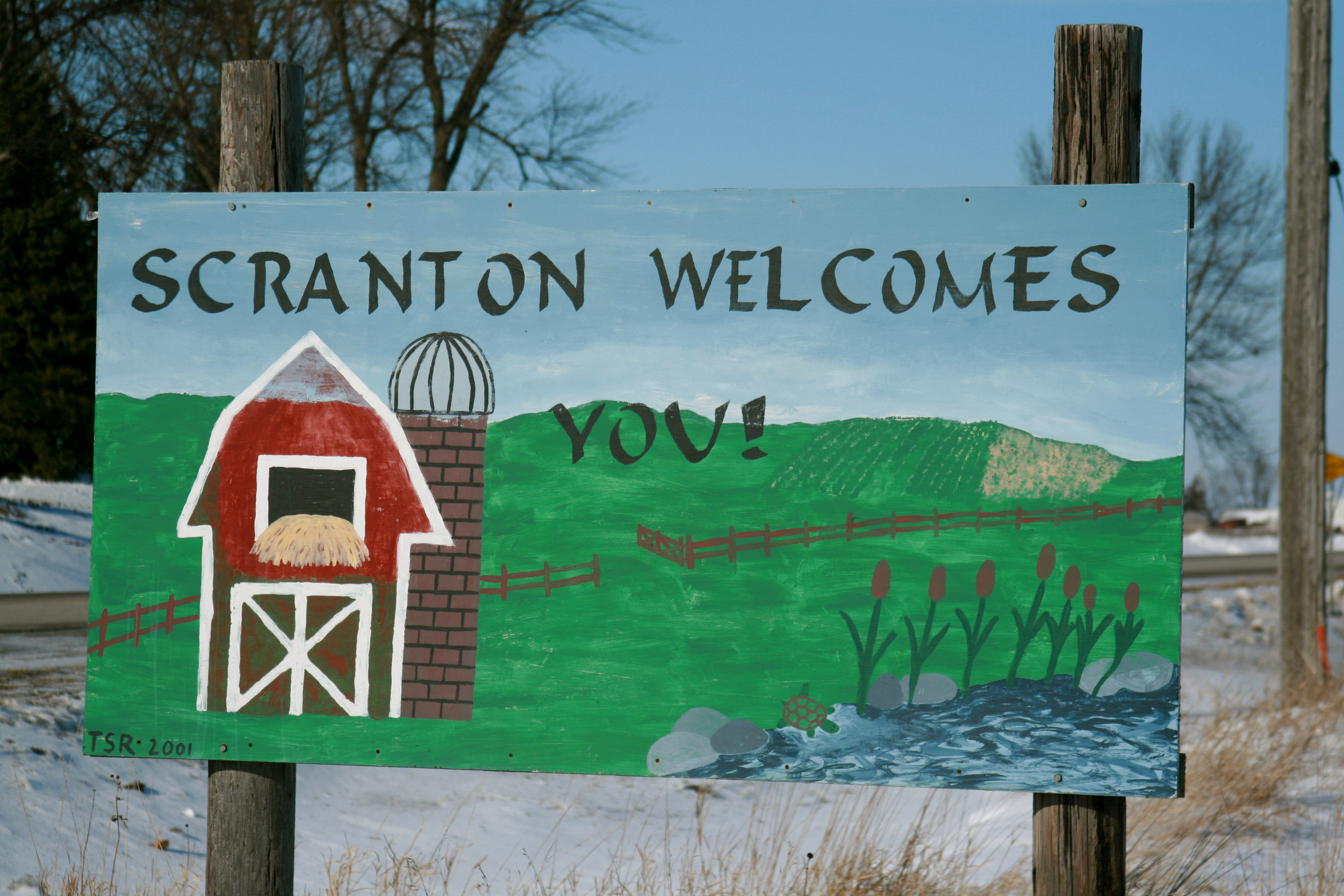
- Scranton welcome sign

- Location of Scranton, Iowa
- Coordinates: 42°01′09″N 94°32′57″W
- Country: United States
- State: Iowa
- County: Greene

Area
  - Total: 1.86 sq mi (4.82 km^{2})
  - Land: 1.86 sq mi (4.82 km^{2})
  - Water: 0 sq mi (0.00 km^{2})
- Elevation: 1,178 ft (359 m)

Population (2020)
  - Total: 511
  - Density: 270/sq mi (106/km^{2})
- Time zone: UTC-6 (Central (CST))
  - Summer (DST): UTC-5 (CDT)
- ZIP code: 51462
- Area code: 712
- FIPS code: 19-71310
- GNIS feature ID: 2396562
- Website: www.scrantoniowa.com

Scranton is a city in Greene County, Iowa, United States. The population was 511 at the time of the 2020 census. It was named after Scranton, Pennsylvania.

== History ==
Scranton was platted in 1869, shortly after the Cedar Rapids & Missouri River Railroad was built through that territory. It was named for Joseph H. Scranton of Scranton, Pennsylvania, who supplied most of the iron rails in the construction of the railroad. Scranton was incorporated in 1880.

Scranton's water tower, built in 1897, is the oldest working water tower in Iowa and ninth oldest in the United States. A fire occurred at the tower in 1907, initially started to melt ice that had caused the town to be without water. Three men were injured attempting to put the fire out, although the tower itself did not suffer any major damage.

== Geography ==
Scranton is located along U.S. Route 30 in the valley of the North Raccoon River.

According to the United States Census Bureau, the city has a total area of 1.88 square miles (4.87 km^{2}), all land.

== Demographics ==
Historical populations
Year	Pop.	±%
1890	715	—
1900	983	+37.5%
1910	845	−14.0%
1920	843	−0.2%
1930	1,058	+25.5%
1940	1,014	−4.2%
1950	891	−12.1%
1960	865	−2.9%
1970	751	−13.2%
1980	748	−0.4%
1990	583	−22.1%
2000	604	+3.6%
2010	557	−7.8%
2020	511	−8.3%
Source:"U.S. Census website". United States Census Bureau. and Iowa Data Center; Source: U.S. Decennial Census

=== 2020 census ===
As of the census of 2020, there were 511 people, 223 households, and 140 families residing in the city. The population density was 274.5 inhabitants per square mile (106.0/km^{2}). There were 257 housing units at an average density of 138.1 per square mile (53.3/km^{2}). The racial makeup of the city was 93.5% White, 0.2% Black or African American, 0.2% Native American, 0.4% Asian, 0.0% Pacific Islander, 1.0% from other races and 4.7% from two or more races. Hispanic or Latino persons of any race comprised 3.3% of the population.

Of the 223 households, 30.0% of which had children under the age of 18 living with them, 45.3% were married couples living together, 11.2% were cohabitating couples, 22.0% had a female householder with no spouse or partner present and 21.5% had a male householder with no spouse or partner present. 37.2% of all households were non-families. 29.1% of all households were made up of individuals, 14.3% had someone living alone who was 65 years old or older.

The median age in the city was 39.5 years. 28.4% of the residents were under the age of 20; 5.5% were between the ages of 20 and 24; 22.3% were from 25 and 44; 23.7% were from 45 and 64; and 20.2% were 65 years of age or older. The gender makeup of the city was 50.1% male and 49.9% female.

=== 2010 census ===
As of the census of 2010, there were 557 people, 238 households, and 143 families residing in the city. The population density was 296.3 inhabitants per square mile (114.4/km^{2}). There were 267 housing units at an average density of 142.0 per square mile (54.8/km^{2}). The racial makeup of the city was 96.4% White, 0.2% Pacific Islander, 2.7% from other races, and 0.7% from two or more races. Hispanic or Latino of any race were 2.9% of the population.

There were 238 households, of which 26.5% had children under the age of 18 living with them, 50.8% were married couples living together, 5.0% had a female householder with no husband present, 4.2% had a male householder with no wife present, and 39.9% were non-families. 34.5% of all households were made up of individuals, and 12.2% had someone living alone who was 65 years of age or older. The average household size was 2.34 and the average family size was 3.06.

The median age in the city was 43.2 years. 23.2% of residents were under the age of 18; 6.7% were between the ages of 18 and 24; 22.2% were from 25 to 44; 27.7% were from 45 to 64; and 20.1% were 65 years of age or older. The gender makeup of the city was 51.2% male and 48.8% female.

=== 2000 census ===
As of the census of 2000, there were 604 people, 258 households, and 157 families residing in the city. The population density was 321.6 inhabitants per square mile (124.2/km^{2}). There were 285 housing units at an average density of 151.8 per square mile (58.6/km^{2}). The racial makeup of the city was 96.52% White, 0.17% Asian, 2.65% from other races, and 0.66% from two or more races. Hispanic or Latino of any race were 5.13% of the population.

There were 258 households, out of which 28.7% had children under the age of 18 living with them, 50.0% were married couples living together, 7.8% had a female householder with no husband present, and 38.8% were non-families. 34.9% of all households were made up of individuals, and 17.8% had someone living alone who was 65 years of age or older. The average household size was 2.34 and the average family size was 3.05.

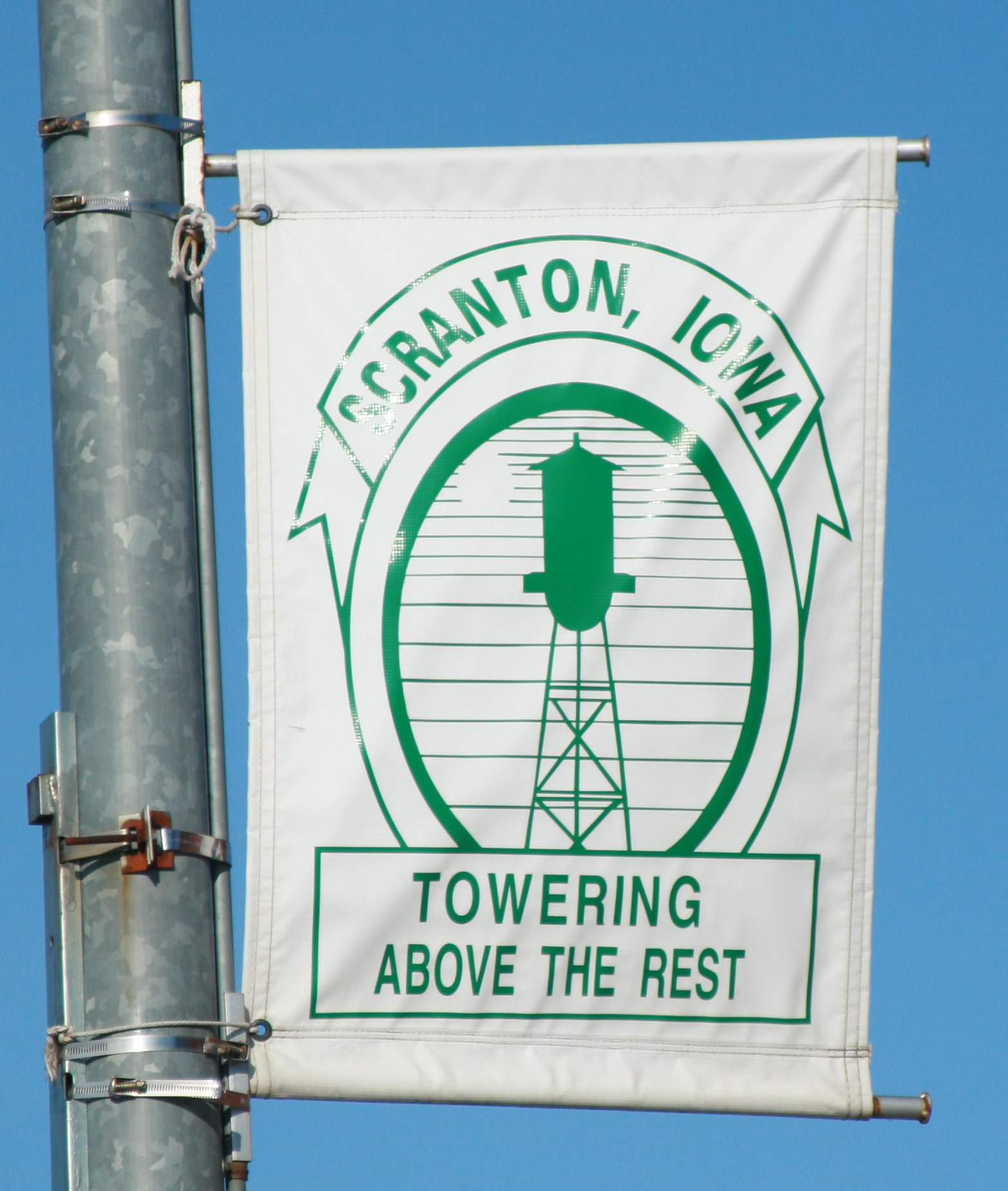
City banner located along Main Street

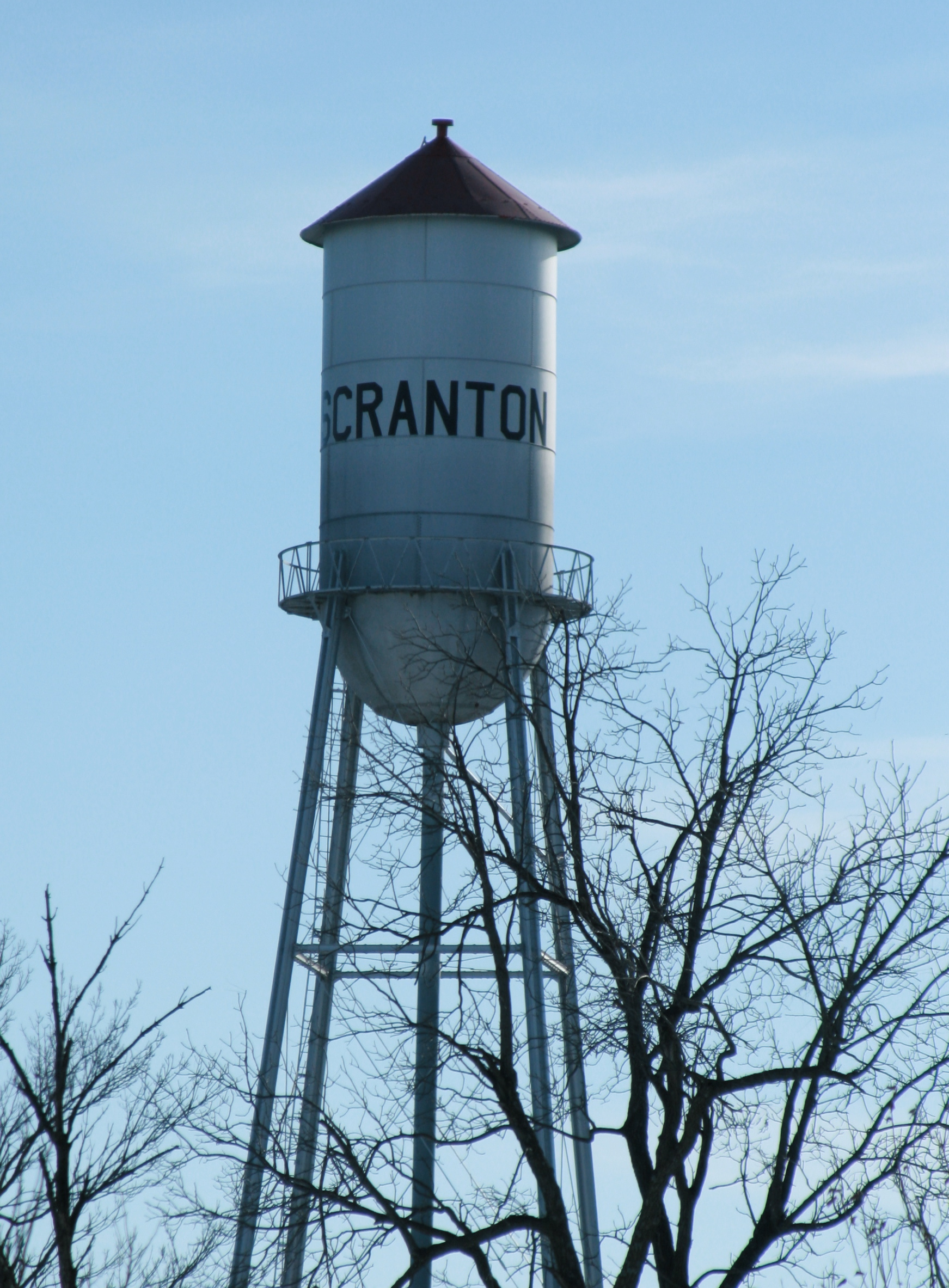
City water tower

In the city, the population was spread out, with 26.5% under the age of 18, 7.8% from 18 to 24, 22.4% from 25 to 44, 24.2% from 45 to 64, and 19.2% who were 65 years of age or older. The median age was 39 years. For every 100 females, there were 93.6 males. For every 100 females age 18 and over, there were 90.6 males.

As of 2000 the median income for a household was $29,375, and the median income for a family was $38,542. Males had a median income of $27,411 versus $17,188 for females. The per capita income for the city was $13,836. About 10.6% of families and 13.1% of the population were below the poverty line, including 13.8% of those under age 18 and 9.1% of those age 65 or over.

== Education ==
Residents are in the Greene County Community School District, which operates Greene County Elementary, Greene County Middle, and Greene County High schools in Jefferson.

It was part of the Scranton School District until July 1, 1992, when that district merged into the Jefferson–Scranton Community School District. It was a part of Jefferson–Scranton until it merged into the Greene County district on July 1, 2014.

Scranton formerly had a public school building of its own, which had a three-story section built in 1915. The school closed in 2008; the school district had notified the city government in 2006 so the city could plan for the future of the school. In 2010 the city government acquired the building, paying $1 for it, and converted it into a community center; the city government considered converting the school facility into an apartment block, but it determined it would have required too much money. The city government determined that it could not find a purpose for the 1913 section; therefore its razing occurred in 2012. The current Greene County district, as of 2014, rented the school gymnasium for athletic meetups.

== Community ==
Annual events in Scranton include the Mid-Summer Festival, held in July, and a Christmas celebration.

Every five years the town holds an all school reunion, with the next scheduled for 2020.

Three churches exist in Scranton; St. Paul's Catholic Church, the United Methodist Church and the Church of Christ.

== Notable people ==
- Ruth Jackson (1902 – 1994), the first female board-certified orthopedic surgeon in the United States
- Tyler Miller, NFL offensive tackle for the Denver Broncos
- Bryce Paup, NFL player
