= East Greene Community School District =

Former school district in Iowa

East Greene Community School District was a school district headquartered in Grand Junction, Iowa. It served the communities of Grand Junction, Dana, and Rippey.

== History ==
The Grand Junction and Dana school districts consolidated in 1959 to form the East Greene district. Rippey joined the district in 1963.

In 2001 the district had 500 students. This was down to 386 students in 2004, and this further declined to 320 in 2013.

In 2012 the district began a grade-sharing arrangement with the Jefferson–Scranton Community School District in which the Grand Junction school became an elementary school, while secondary students began attending Greene County Middle School and Greene County High School in Jefferson. The East Greene district consolidated with the Jefferson–Scranton district into the Greene County Community School District on July 1, 2014.

== Schools ==
The Rippey School served as the East Greene district's elementary school, while middle and high school students attended school in Grand Junction. In 2012 the Grand Junction building became an elementary school (as East Greene Elementary School and Greene County Intermediate School) while secondary students went to school in Jefferson.

- Rippey area residents voted in favor, on a 154 to 23 basis, in November 1919 to establish the Rippey Consolidated School, which replaced all of the previous schools and was built in 1921 for $147,000. In 1957 the athletic facility, Wisecup Memorial Gymnasium, opened. The East Greene School district began operating the school in 1963. The school had the district athletic facilities. East Greene closed Rippey School on May 18, 2012. The district arranged for the demolition of the Rippey School before it consolidated into the Greene County district. In October 2014 the Rippey School was demolished, and the property was given to the City of Rippey. A monument and time capsule designed by Rippey School alum Keith Devilbiss was put in its place in 2015. A park was also put at the former school site. The gymnasium remains standing.
- The Greene County district continued operating the Grand Junction school until 2017. In 2017 the Grand Junction city government decided to demolish the former Grand Junction school.
