= Rippey, Iowa =

- City
- Location of Rippey, Iowa
- Coordinates: 41°56′02″N 94°12′03″W
- Country: United States
- State: Iowa
- County: Greene

Area
  - Total: 0.86 sq mi (2.24 km^{2})
  - Land: 0.86 sq mi (2.24 km^{2})
  - Water: 0 sq mi (0.00 km^{2})
- Elevation: 1,073 ft (327 m)

Population (2020)
  - Total: 220
  - Density: 254.1/sq mi (98.12/km^{2})
- Time zone: UTC-6 (Central (CST))
  - Summer (DST): UTC-5 (CDT)
- ZIP code: 50235
- Area code: 515
- FIPS code: 19-67215
- GNIS feature ID: 2396379

Rippey is a city in Greene County, Iowa, United States. The population was 220 at the time of the 2020 census.

== Geography ==
According to the United States Census Bureau, the city has a total area of 0.84 square miles (2.18 km^{2}), all land.

== History ==
Rippey got its start in the year 1870, following construction of the Des Moines Valley Railroad through that territory.

In the late 19th century, Rippey and Angus, four miles to the southeast, were the centers of coal mining in Greene County. The Keystone Coal Company opened three mines in Angus between 1878 and 1887; the last of these was worked out by 1887. Between 1882 and 1887, the Standard Mine also operated in the region. Keystone opened new mines south of Rippey into the 20th century, where they were joined by the Snake Creek Coal company and the Buckeye coal company. One mine, with a 125-foot shaft, was located a short distance from the Rippey railroad station.

== Demographics ==
Historical populations
Year	Pop.	±%
1900	395	—
1910	407	+3.0%
1920	409	+0.5%
1930	357	−12.7%
1940	421	+17.9%
1950	354	−15.9%
1960	331	−6.5%
1970	270	−18.4%
1980	304	+12.6%
1990	275	−9.5%
2000	319	+16.0%
2010	292	−8.5%
2020	220	−24.7%
Source:"U.S. Census website". United States Census Bureau. and Iowa Data Center; Source: U.S. Decennial Census

=== 2020 census ===
As of the census of 2020, there were 220 people, 103 households, and 61 families residing in the city. The population density was 254.1 inhabitants per square mile (98.1/km^{2}). There were 115 housing units at an average density of 132.8 per square mile (51.3/km^{2}). The racial makeup of the city was 91.8% White, 0.0% Black or African American, 0.5% Native American, 0.0% Asian, 0.0% Pacific Islander, 2.7% from other races and 5.0% from two or more races. Hispanic or Latino persons of any race comprised 7.3% of the population.

Of the 103 households, 30.1% of which had children under the age of 18 living with them, 40.8% were married couples living together, 18.4% were cohabitating couples, 14.6% had a female householder with no spouse or partner present and 26.2% had a male householder with no spouse or partner present. 40.8% of all households were non-families. 26.2% of all households were made up of individuals, 9.7% had someone living alone who was 65 years old or older.

The median age in the city was 43.5 years. 23.6% of the residents were under the age of 20; 7.3% were between the ages of 20 and 24; 23.6% were from 25 and 44; 30.0% were from 45 and 64; and 15.5% were 65 years of age or older. The gender makeup of the city was 53.2% male and 46.8% female.

=== 2010 census ===
As of the census of 2010, there were 292 people, 116 households, and 70 families residing in the city. The population density was 347.6 inhabitants per square mile (134.2/km^{2}). There were 129 housing units at an average density of 153.6 per square mile (59.3/km^{2}). The racial makeup of the city was 97.9% White and 2.1% from other races. Hispanic or Latino of any race were 5.8% of the population.

There were 116 households, of which 31.0% had children under the age of 18 living with them, 43.1% were married couples living together, 13.8% had a female householder with no husband present, 3.4% had a male householder with no wife present, and 39.7% were non-families. 27.6% of all households were made up of individuals, and 11.2% had someone living alone who was 65 years of age or older. The average household size was 2.52 and the average family size was 3.11.

The median age in the city was 38 years. 27.1% of residents were under the age of 18; 6.9% were between the ages of 18 and 24; 26.4% were from 25 to 44; 25.4% were from 45 to 64; and 14.4% were 65 years of age or older. The gender makeup of the city was 51.7% male and 48.3% female.

=== 2000 census ===
As of the census of 2000, there were 319 people, 125 households, and 91 families residing in the city. The population density was 378.7 inhabitants per square mile (146.2/km^{2}). There were 138 housing units at an average density of 163.8 per square mile (63.2/km^{2}). The racial makeup of the city was 96.55% White, 0.31% African American, 0.94% from other races, and 2.19% from two or more races. Hispanic or Latino of any race were 4.08% of the population.

There were 125 households, out of which 38.4% had children under the age of 18 living with them, 53.6% were married couples living together, 12.0% had a female householder with no husband present, and 27.2% were non-families. 27.2% of all households were made up of individuals, and 12.8% had someone living alone who was 65 years of age or older. The average household size was 2.55 and the average family size was 3.04.

In the city, the population was spread out, with 31.0% under the age of 18, 6.6% from 18 to 24, 27.0% from 25 to 44, 19.4% from 45 to 64, and 16.0% who were 65 years of age or older. The median age was 35 years. For every 100 females, there were 114.1 males. For every 100 females age 18 and over, there were 93.0 males.

The median income for a household in the city was $33,611, and the median income for a family was $42,656. Males had a median income of $25,833 versus $24,531 for females. The per capita income for the city was $14,344. About 3.4% of families and 6.6% of the population were below the poverty line, including 8.6% of those under age 18 and 6.0% of those age 65 or over.

== Education ==
Residents are in the Greene County Community School District, which operates Greene County Elementary, Greene County Middle, and Greene County High schools in Jefferson.

In the late 1800s Rippey had a high school in the town itself, as well as an area township high school and eleven local grade schools in the surrounding rural area. Area residents voted in favor, on a 154 to 23 basis, in November 1919 to establish the Rippey Consolidated School, which replaced all of the previous schools and was built in 1921 for $147,000. In 1957 the athletic facility, Wisecup Memorial Gymnasium, opened. In 1963 the city joined the East Greene Community School District, which began operating the Rippey School at that time. The Rippey School served as the East Greene district's elementary school, while middle and high school students attended school in Grand Junction.

East Greene closed Rippey School on May 18, 2012. In 2012 elementary grades moved to Grand Junction while secondary students began attending schools operated by the Jefferson–Scranton Community School District. The East Greene district arranged for the demolition of the Rippey School before it consolidated into the Greene County district, which took control of the Rippey School. The districts consolidated into the Jefferson County district on July 1, 2014. In October 2014 the Rippey School was demolished, and the property was given to the City of Rippey. A monument and time capsule designed by Rippey School alum Keith Devilbiss was put in its place in 2015. A park was also put at the former school site. The gymnasium remains standing.

== Windfarm ==
Located near Rippey, a 50 megawatt (MW) windfarm was constructed in 2012. The Rippey windfarm is owned by RPM Access and consists of 20 Nordex 2.5 MW turbines mounted on 100 meters (330 feet) tall towers. Central Iowa Power Cooperative is purchasing the power generated by the project under a long-term power purchase agreement and is distributing the power to its member cooperatives.

== BRR - Bicycle Ride to Rippey ==
Annually since 1977 on the first Saturday in February, the Bicycle Ride to Rippey, known as BRR, occurs. BRR was founded on February 6, 1978, by Dennis "Doc Savage" Hurley along with Jim Walstrom who both wanted to get a ski trip going but instead put together the Coldest Day of the Year Bike Ride. The first year, BRR had 22 riders who made it to warm up at Larry Vodenik's Rippey Tap and, the next year, only 12 rode. In 2016, 500 pre registered with over 1700 bicyclists riding the route and, in 2017, 650 pre registered with more than 2000 riders participating on the day of BRR. Starting in Perry and ending in Perry (map of the route), this 24-mile (39 km) often frozen fun ride is the beginning of RAGBRAI season. The Perry Lions Club hosts a breakfast starting at 7am and packet pickup begins at 7:30am in Hotel Pattee, 1112 Willis Ave. At 10am, the bicycle riders depart for Rippey from one block east of Highway 144 at the intersection of Second Street and Willis near Hotel Pattee. The participants are encouraged to leave Rippey by 3pm. The route support ends at 7pm. In 2017, the cost to support the event with advance purchase through Eventbrite is $17 without merchandise or $25 with merchandise or $33 with merchandise and a breakfast. $35 on the day of the event gets you a BRR 2017 shirt, hot chocolate, SAG services, admission to the Rec Center and other local discounts. The Perry Chamber of Commerce sponsors the activity, but the highlight of the ride is the warm welcome always given to the riders by the town of Rippey.
