= Chad Elliott =

Chad Elliott may refer to:

- Chad James Elliott, American songwriter, record producer, and audio engineer
- Chad Allen Elliott (born 1974), American singer-songwriter, and artist
