= JCSB =

JCSB may refer to:

- Jackson County School Board
- Jefferson County School Board, see Jefferson School District
- Johnson County School Board, see Johnson County School District

== See also ==
- J. C. S. Blackburn (1838–1918), Kentucky politician
