= JCPS =

JCPS can refer to:

- Jersey City Public Schools
- Jefferson County Public Schools, various school systems
- Joint Center for Political and Economic Studies, a national nonprofit American research and public policy institution
