= The Land Girls =

- UK DVD cover
- Directed by: David Leland
- Written by: Keith Dewhurst; David Leland
- Based on: Land Girls by Angela Huth
- Produced by: Ruth Jackson; Simon Relph; Andrew Warren
- Starring: Catherine McCormack; Rachel Weisz; Anna Friel; Steven Mackintosh
- Cinematography: Henry Braham
- Edited by: Nick Moore
- Music by: Brian Lock
- Production companies: Intermedia Films; Channel Four Films; Greenpoint Films; West Eleven Films; Caméra One/Arena Films; Canal+ Sofineurope
- Distributed by: FilmFour Distributors (United Kingdom); Pyramide Distribution (France)
- Release dates: 20 January 1998 (Sundance); 12 June 1998 (US); 4 September 1998 (UK)
- Running time: 111 minutes
- Countries: United Kingdom; France
- Language: English
- Budget: £6 million
- Box office: $3.2 million

The Land Girls is a 1998 film directed by David Leland and starring Catherine McCormack, Rachel Weisz, Anna Friel, Steven Mackintosh and Ann Bell. The film is a British/French co-production based on the 1995 novel Land Girls by Angela Huth.

The title refers to the real-life British women who were called upon to assist rural Englanders when men left their farms to fight in the First and Second World Wars.

== Plot ==
During both the First and Second World Wars, the Women's Land Army was set up in the United Kingdom to recruit women to work at farms where men had left to go to war. Women in the WLA were nicknamed "land girls".

Set in 1941 in the Dorset countryside, three "land girls" arrive on a remote farm. They are an unlikely trio: hairdresser Prue is vivacious and sexy, Cambridge University graduate Ag is quiet and more reserved, and dreamy Stella is in love with Philip, a dashing Royal Navy officer. Despite the women's differences, they soon become close friends. The film follows their relationships with each other and the men in their lives in the face of war.

== Cast ==
- Catherine McCormack as Stella
- Rachel Weisz as Ag (Agapanthus)
- Anna Friel as Prue (Prudence)
- Steven Mackintosh as Joe Lawrence
- Tom Georgeson as Mr Lawrence
- Maureen O'Brien as Mrs Lawrence
- Lucy Akhurst as Janet
- Gerald Down as Ratty, Lawrence Farm Hand
- Paul Bettany as Philip

== Production ==
Filming locations included the scenic Exmoor National Park, Crowcombe Heathfield station on the West Somerset Railway and Dulverton.

The film cost £6 million.

== Reception ==
The film holds a 59% on Rotten Tomatoes based on 17 reviews.

In a review for The New York Times, Stephen Holden wrote, "The movie is ultimately more passionate about its characters' place in history than about their individual lives, which take fairly predictable if not always happy turns. In the end, all three women blend together as an idealized everywoman lightly sketched on a larger historical canvas."

Holden concluded, "The film's most evocative historical set piece shows a parade and air show at which a newly built Spitfire makes its maiden flight. The movie is unequivocal about the nobility of this moment. The shared sacrifice and hard labor have all been worth it. As the aircraft soars and dips across the rural English landscape, it is the very embodiment of a glorious winged victory soon to come."

Roger Ebert praised the cinematography in particular, stating "What I liked about the movie--what I preferred to the romances and relationships--was its look, its sensual evocation of the British countryside in winter." Peter Stack of the San Francisco Chronicle wrote, "Wistful but not precious, 'The Land Girls' takes a bit of acclimatizing, but Leland ('Wish You Were Here') makes his leisurely pacing an attribute. The film sinks into the green, serene countryside, a place where emotions echo big."

=== Box office ===
After 11 weeks on release the film had grossed £1.3 million ($2.2 million) in the United Kingdom. It grossed $1 million internationally for a worldwide total of $3.2 million.
