= December 2021 tornado outbreak =

December 2021 tornado outbreak may refer to:

- Tornado outbreak of December 10-11, 2021 - The deadliest tornado outbreak in December, included the 2021 Western Kentucky tornado
- December 2021 Midwest derecho and tornado outbreak - The most prolific tornado in December, as well as the largest tornado outbreak in record for any day of the year in Iowa
