= Jefferson County Public Schools =

Jefferson County Public Schools can refer to a U.S. public school system in several states, including:

- Jefferson County Board of Education (Alabama)
- Jefferson County Public Schools (Colorado)
- Jefferson County Schools (Florida)
- Jefferson County Public Schools (Kentucky)
- Jefferson County Public Schools (Tennessee)
- Jefferson County Public Schools (West Virginia)

== See also ==
- Jefferson County Board of Education (disambiguation)
- Jefferson School District (disambiguation)
