= Jefferson County Board of Education =

Jefferson County Board of Education may refer to a U.S. public school board in several states, including:

- Jefferson County Board of Education (Alabama)
- Jefferson County Board of Education (Kentucky)

== See also ==
- Jefferson County Public Schools (disambiguation)
