= Jefferson School District =

Jefferson School District may refer to:

- Jefferson County School District in Jefferson County, Alabama
- Jefferson Patriots School District in Phoenix, Arizona
- Jefferson County R-1 School District in Golden, Colorado
- Jefferson County School District in Monticello, Florida
- Jefferson City School District in Jefferson, Georgia
- Jefferson County School District in Louisville, Georgia
- Jefferson County School District 251 in Rigby, Idaho
- West Jefferson School District in Terreton, Indiana
- Jefferson–Scranton Community School District in Jefferson, Iowa
- Jefferson County School District in Louisville, Kentucky
- Jefferson County School District, in Fayette, Mississippi
- Jefferson County School District, in Jefferson New York
- Jefferson Area Local School District, in Jefferson, Ohio
- Jefferson Local School District, in West Jefferson, Ohio
- Jefferson Township Local School District, in Dayton, Ohio
- Jefferson School District, Oregon in Jefferson, Oregon
- Jefferson County School District (Oregon) in Madras, Oregon
- Jefferson County School District, in Dandridge, Tennessee
- Jefferson Independent School District in Jefferson, Texas
- Jefferson County School District in Charles Town, West Virginia
- Jefferson County School District in Jefferson, Wisconsin
- Jefferson School District in Tracy, California.
- Jefferson Schools in Monroe County, Michigan

== See also ==
- Franklin-Jefferson County Social Education District in Benton, Illinois
- Jefferson Davis County School District in Prentiss, Missouri
- Port Jefferson UF School District in Port Jefferson, New York
- South Jefferson County School District in Adams Center, New York
- Gahanna-Jefferson City School District in Gahanna, Ohio
- Jefferson-Morgan School District in Jefferson, Pennsylvania
- Jefferson Hills School District in Jefferson Hills, Pennsylvania
- West Jefferson Hills School District in Jefferson Hills, Pennsylvania
- Elk Point-Jefferson School District 61-7 in Elk Point, South Dakota
- Hardin-Jefferson Independent School District in Sour Lake, Texas
