= Chad Allen Elliott =

American Folk singer songwriter (born 1974)

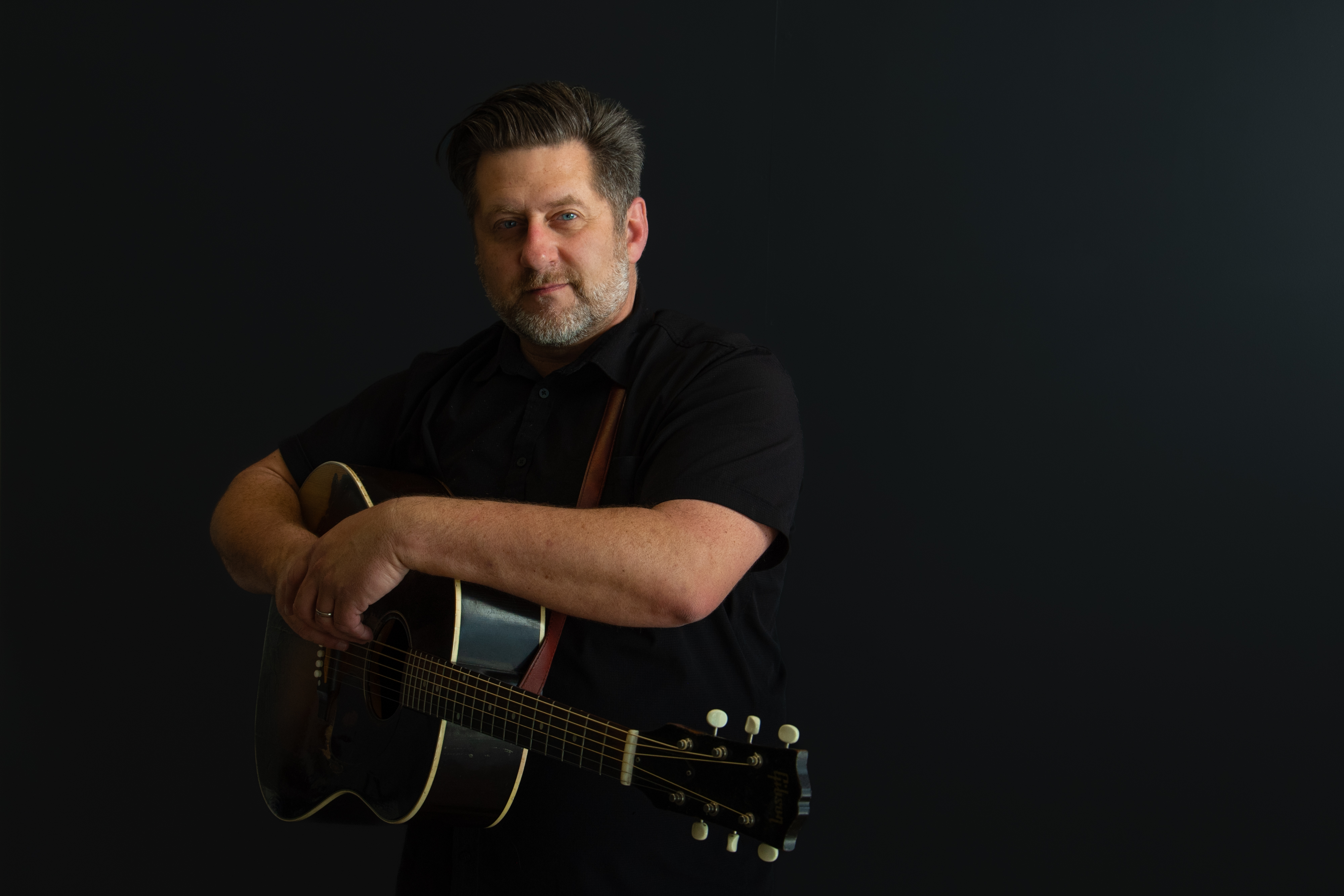
- Chad in 2025
- Born: Chad Allen Elliott; January 23, 1974; Mt. Ayr, Iowa
- Education: Graceland University (B.A.)
- Website: www.chadelliott.net

Chad Allen Elliott (born January 23, 1974) is an American singer songwriter, and artist. Chad Elliott is a full-time musician to this day. He tours solo and with Kathryn Fox in a duo called the Weary Ramblers. Chad also operates Elliott Art Studio in Jefferson, IA, where he creates and sells art.

== Early life ==
Chad Elliott is a graduate of Graceland University in Lamoni, IA, with a Bachelor of Arts in ceramics and has since collected graduate credits from the University of Montana in Missoula, MT. Early in his career, he was recognized for his artistic ability by being chosen as the “Best of Show” at the Iowa Student Artists Exhibit in 1995.

Chad began writing music and practicing the guitar in 1996 in between traveling, and painting signs in the Northwest parts of Montana.

In 2008 Chad Elliott created the first-ever “People Project,” an ephemeral artwork for the organization ArtsLIVE during the University of Okoboji Winter Games in Okoboji, IA. During the Project he positioned 175 people on the ice of a frozen lake in the shape of a stylized turtle, which was photographed from an airplane.

== Career ==
Chad Elliott was the Folk Alley Open Mic winner on September 5, 2006. Chad Elliott was the 1st place winner of the Woody Guthry Song Contest on July 8-12, 2009, at the Woody Guthry Folk Festival held at Okemah, Oklahoma Chad Elliott received 3rd place for his song "Same Old Way" at the International Songwriting Contest in the Americana Category in 2009. Chad Elliott & Bonita Crowe received 1st place in the solo/duo category of the 2013 Iowa Blues Challenge, hosted by the Central Iowa Blues Society. Chad Elliott was a Finalist at the 2015 LEAF Festival.

Chad Elliott was a Finalist at the 2018 and 2020 Kerrville New Folk Competition. Chad Elliott was inducted into the Iowa Rock 'n Roll Hall of Fame on Sunday, August 31, 2025, during a ceremony held at the Sami Center in Okoboji, IA. The Weary Ramblers won the International Blues Challenge for Best Solo/Duo Band in Memphis, Tennessee, hosted by The Blues Foundation on January 13-17 2026. Chad Elliott won the award for best guitarist in Memphis, Tennessee, at the Blues Challenge hosted by The Blues Foundation. January 13-17 2026. The Weary Ramblers won Silver in the 'Americana', and 'Best Duo' categories at the Global Music Awards. February 5th 2026.

=== Mural work ===
Chad Elliott has an extensive list of mural work throughout Iowa and beyond. His mural work includes two 5 foot by 12 foot canvas paintings installed in 2012 in the Spencer Community Theatre. He also completed a 16 foot by 40 foot landscape mural in 2013 on the side of Mohr Lumber in Coon Rapids, IA to commemorate the town's sesquicentennial. In Pampa, TX, Chad Elliott installed a mural titled "This Land is Your Land" at the Woody Guthry Folk Music Center. In 2022 he painted "Catch of the Day," which was installed at Crouse Park in Sparta, NC. In recent work, Chad Elliott painted two murals on the East and West sides of the Greene County Historical Museum in Jefferson, IA in 2025.

== Discography ==
Album	Year
Greener Grass One Man's Junk	1999
New Young Destination	2001
(homemade) Bowl of Stars	2003
Starling Songs	2004
Bowl of Stars	2004
Humbled At My Door	2006
Swiftsure	2008
Redemption Man	2009
The Den Sessions	2010
So Sang the Crow	2013
Wreck and Ruin	2015
RINGGOLD	2017
Rest Heavy	2018
King Pelican	2019
Tangle with the Ghost	2020
Singing River	2021
Untested Wings	2024

== Poetry books ==
Title	Date Released
Rumble and Flash	April 3, 2018
Wilderman's Treetop Tales	April 3, 2018
