= Myrtle, Minnesota =

City in Minnesota, United States

Myrtle
- City
- Location of Myrtle, Minnesota
- Coordinates: 43°33′48″N 93°09′47″W
- Country: United States
- State: Minnesota
- County: Freeborn

Area
  - Total: 0.097 sq mi (0.25 km^{2})
  - Land: 0.097 sq mi (0.25 km^{2})
  - Water: 0 sq mi (0.00 km^{2})
- Elevation: 1,257 ft (383 m)

Population (2020)
  - Total: 47
  - Density: 486.2/sq mi (187.73/km^{2})
- Time zone: UTC-6 (Central (CST))
  - Summer (DST): UTC-5 (CDT)
- ZIP code: 56036
- Area code: 507
- FIPS code: 27-44890
- GNIS feature ID: 2395145

Myrtle is a city in Freeborn County, Minnesota, United States. As of the 2020 census, Myrtle had a population of 47.

== History ==
Myrtle was platted in 1900, when the railroad was extended to that point. The Myrtle post office closed in 1993.

== Geography ==
According to the United States Census Bureau, the city has a total area of 0.11 square miles (0.28 km^{2}), all land.

Myrtle is located along Freeborn County Roads 13 and 30.

== Demographics ==
Historical population
Census	Pop.	Note	%±
1940	133		—
1950	136		2.3%
1960	89		−34.6%
1970	83		−6.7%
1980	86		3.6%
1990	72		−16.3%
2000	63		−12.5%
2010	48		−23.8%
2020	47		−2.1%
U.S. Decennial Census

=== 2010 census ===
As of the census of 2010, there were 48 people, 26 households, and 12 families living in the city. The population density was 436.4 inhabitants per square mile (168.5/km^{2}). There were 36 housing units at an average density of 327.3 per square mile (126.4/km^{2}). The racial makeup of the city was 100.0% White. Hispanic or Latino of any race were 16.7% of the population.

There were 26 households, of which 15.4% had children under the age of 18 living with them, 30.8% were married couples living together, 7.7% had a female householder with no husband present, 7.7% had a male householder with no wife present, and 53.8% were non-families. 53.8% of all households were made up of individuals, and 7.6% had someone living alone who was 65 years of age or older. The average household size was 1.85 and the average family size was 2.83.

The median age in the city was 45.5 years. 22.9% of residents were under the age of 18; 2.1% were between the ages of 18 and 24; 25.1% were from 25 to 44; 37.5% were from 45 to 64; and 12.5% were 65 years of age or older. The gender makeup of the city was 58.3% male and 41.7% female.

=== 2000 census ===
As of the census of 2000, there were 63 people, 30 households, and 15 families living in the city. The population density was 606.2 inhabitants per square mile (234.1/km^{2}). There were 36 housing units at an average density of 346.4 per square mile (133.7/km^{2}). The racial makeup of the city was 96.83% White and 3.17% Asian.

There were 30 households, out of which 20.0% had children under the age of 18 living with them, 40.0% were married couples living together, 3.3% had a female householder with no husband present, and 50.0% were non-families. 43.3% of all households were made up of individuals, and 16.7% had someone living alone who was 65 years of age or older. The average household size was 2.10 and the average family size was 3.07.

In the city, the population was spread out, with 19.0% under the age of 18, 9.5% from 18 to 24, 25.4% from 25 to 44, 31.7% from 45 to 64, and 14.3% who were 65 years of age or older. The median age was 42 years. For every 100 females, there were 125.0 males. For every 100 females age 18 and over, there were 121.7 males.

The median income for a household in the city was $23,125, and the median income for a family was $43,125. Males had a median income of $20,833 versus $18,750 for females. The per capita income for the city was $13,164. None of the population and none of the families were below the poverty line.
