= Grand Junction, Iowa =

- City
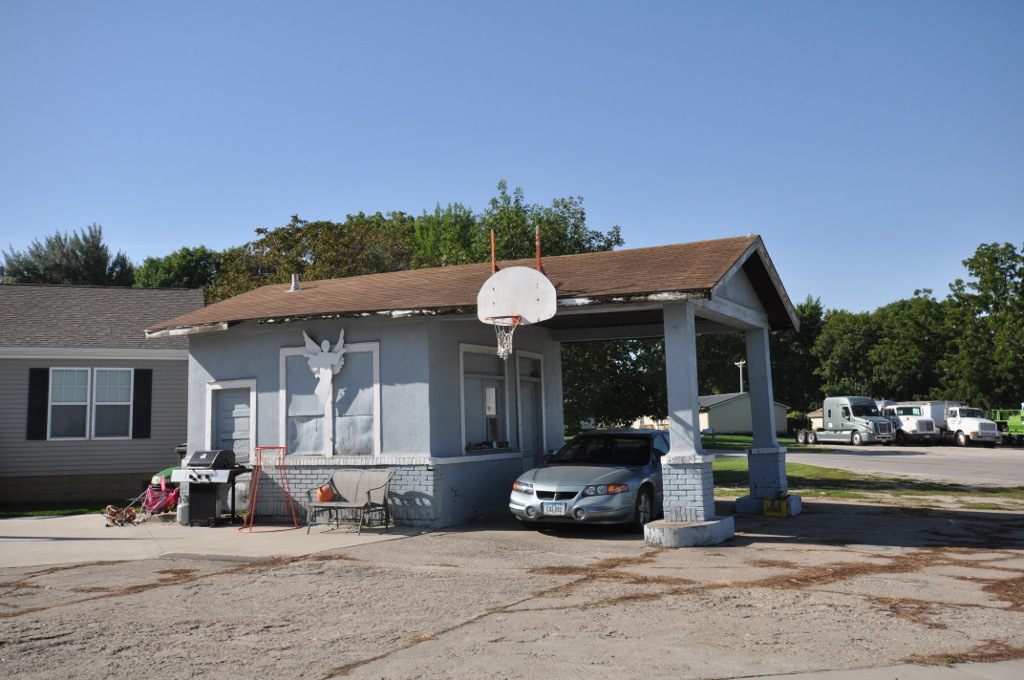
- Building in Grand Junction

- Location of Grand Junction, Iowa
- Coordinates: 42°01′58″N 94°14′13″W
- Country: United States
- State: Iowa
- County: Greene

Area
  - Total: 0.97 sq mi (2.51 km^{2})
  - Land: 0.97 sq mi (2.51 km^{2})
  - Water: 0 sq mi (0.00 km^{2})
- Elevation: 1,034 ft (315 m)

Population (2020)
  - Total: 725
  - Density: 748.0/sq mi (288.79/km^{2})
- Time zone: UTC-6 (Central (CST))
  - Summer (DST): UTC-5 (CDT)
- ZIP code: 50107
- Area code: 515
- FIPS code: 19-31980
- GNIS feature ID: 2394949
- Website: grandjunctioniowa.org

Grand Junction is a city in Greene County, Iowa, United States. The population was 725 at the time of the 2020 census.

== History ==
Grand Junction took its name from its position at the junction of the Keokuk and Des Moines and the Chicago and Northwestern railroads. Grand Junction was incorporated in 1873.

== Geography ==
According to the United States Census Bureau, the city has a total area of 0.97 square miles (2.51 km^{2}), all land.

== Demographics ==
Historical populations
Year	Pop.	±%
1870	444	—
1880	752	+69.4%
1890	932	+23.9%
1900	1,113	+19.4%
1910	1,012	−9.1%
1920	1,010	−0.2%
1930	1,025	+1.5%
1940	1,125	+9.8%
1950	1,036	−7.9%
1960	949	−8.4%
1970	967	+1.9%
1980	970	+0.3%
1990	808	−16.7%
2000	964	+19.3%
2010	824	−14.5%
2020	725	−12.0%
Source:"U.S. Census website". United States Census Bureau. and Iowa Data Center; Source: U.S. Decennial Census

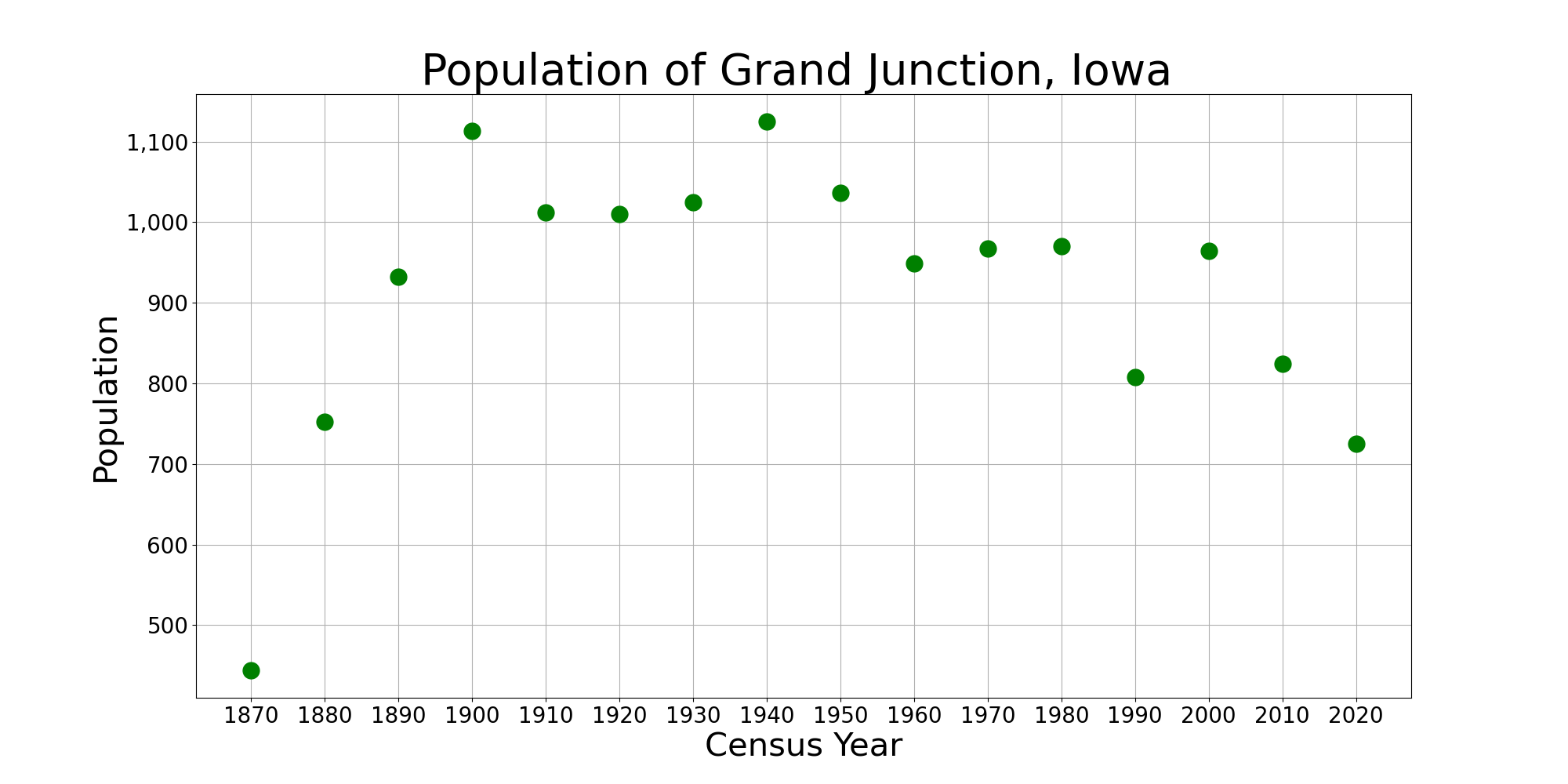
The population of Grand Junction, Iowa from US census data

=== 2020 census ===
As of the census of 2020, there were 725 people, 308 households, and 189 families residing in the city. The population density was 748.0 inhabitants per square mile (288.8/km^{2}). There were 359 housing units at an average density of 370.4 per square mile (143.0/km^{2}). The racial makeup of the city was 95.9% White, 0.0% Black or African American, 0.3% Native American, 0.6% Asian, 0.0% Pacific Islander, 0.3% from other races and 3.0% from two or more races. Hispanic or Latino persons of any race comprised 1.0% of the population.

Of the 308 households, 26.3% of which had children under the age of 18 living with them, 42.9% were married couples living together, 7.8% were cohabitating couples, 28.9% had a female householder with no spouse or partner present and 20.5% had a male householder with no spouse or partner present. 38.6% of all households were non-families. 34.7% of all households were made up of individuals, 18.5% had someone living alone who was 65 years old or older.

The median age in the city was 44.1 years. 24.1% of the residents were under the age of 20; 6.2% were between the ages of 20 and 24; 21.2% were from 25 and 44; 28.3% were from 45 and 64; and 20.1% were 65 years of age or older. The gender makeup of the city was 48.0% male and 52.0% female.

=== 2010 census ===
As of the census of 2010, there were 824 people, 329 households, and 199 families residing in the city. The population density was 849.5 inhabitants per square mile (328.0/km^{2}). There were 383 housing units at an average density of 394.8 per square mile (152.4/km^{2}). The racial makeup of the city was 96.6% White, 0.6% African American, 1.2% Native American, 0.7% Asian, 0.5% from other races, and 0.4% from two or more races. Hispanic or Latino of any race were 1.8% of the population.

There were 329 households, of which 30.1% had children under the age of 18 living with them, 43.8% were married couples living together, 11.2% had a female householder with no husband present, 5.5% had a male householder with no wife present, and 39.5% were non-families. 33.4% of all households were made up of individuals, and 17.1% had someone living alone who was 65 years of age or older. The average household size was 2.50 and the average family size was 3.21.

The median age in the city was 37.7 years. 28.2% of residents were under the age of 18; 8.4% were between the ages of 18 and 24; 22.7% were from 25 to 44; 24.4% were from 45 to 64; and 16.1% were 65 years of age or older. The gender makeup of the city was 51.5% male and 48.5% female.

=== 2000 census ===
As of the census of 2000, there were 964 people, 369 households, and 257 families residing in the city. The population density was 999.1 inhabitants per square mile (385.8/km^{2}). There were 407 housing units at an average density of 421.8 per square mile (162.9/km^{2}). The racial makeup of the city was 98.24% White, 0.10% African American, 0.10% Asian, 1.04% from other races, and 0.52% from two or more races. Hispanic or Latino of any race were 0.93% of the population.

There were 369 households, out of which 35.8% had children under the age of 18 living with them, 55.8% were married couples living together, 8.7% had a female householder with no husband present, and 30.1% were non-families. 27.1% of all households were made up of individuals, and 14.6% had someone living alone who was 65 years of age or older. The average household size was 2.61 and the average family size was 3.20.

30.9% are under the age of 18, 7.3% from 18 to 24, 28.0% from 25 to 44, 17.0% from 45 to 64, and 16.8% who were 65 years of age or older. The median age was 34 years. For every 100 females, there were 102.9 males. For every 100 females age 18 and over, there were 94.7 males.

The median income for a household in the city was $27,875, and the median income for a family was $34,875. Males had a median income of $27,727 versus $19,565 for females. The per capita income for the city was $12,733. About 11.5% of families and 14.6% of the population were below the poverty line, including 17.5% of those under age 18 and 15.0% of those age 65 or over.

== Education ==
Residents are in the Greene County Community School District, which operates Greene County Elementary, Greene County Middle, and Greene County High schools in Jefferson.

The Grand Junction and Dana school districts consolidated in 1959 to form the East Greene Community School District. The Rippey School served as the East Greene district's elementary school, while middle and high school students attended school in Grand Junction. In 2012 elementary grades moved to Grand Junction while secondary students began attending schools operated by the Jefferson–Scranton Community School District. The East Greene and Jefferson–Scranton districts consolidated into the Greene County Community School District on July 1, 2014. The Greene County district continued operating the Grand Junction school until 2017. In 2017 the city government decided to demolish the former Grand Junction school. The playground was left intact for the use of area residents.
