= Ruth Jackson =

American orthopedic surgeon

- Born: December 13, 1902; Scranton, Iowa
- Died: August 28, 1994 (aged 91); Dallas, Texas
- Education: University of Texas at Austin; Baylor College of Medicine (MD)
- Medical career
- Profession: Physician
- Field: Orthopedic surgery

Ruth Jackson (December 13, 1902 – August 28, 1994) was the first female board-certified orthopedic surgeon in the United States and the first female admitted to the American Academy of Orthopaedic Surgeons.

== Life and death ==
Ruth Jackson was born on a farm near Scranton, Iowa and moved to Dallas, Texas at age 14. Jackson married, but divorced after 2 years so she could concentrate on her work. She died in the Baylor University Medical Center at Dallas in 1994 at the age of 91.

== Education and career ==
Upon completing high school, Jackson told her parents she was planning to take premedical instruction at the University of Texas at Austin, but her father disapproved so she became a sociology major. She changed her major to premedicine before graduating in 1924 when she learned a father was unable to support his family because of a bad knee. Jackson was then motivated to learn how to prevent instances like that in the future.

She earned her bachelor's degree in economics and sociology from the University of Texas at Austin, and her medical degree from Baylor College of Medicine in 1928, where she was one of four women in a class over 100 students. In her training as a med student, Jackson was not allowed to examine men and was told at orientation that the female students would need to score grades 10 points higher than the male students in order to graduate with "equal standing". Jackson graduated 8th in her graduating class of 1928. After graduation, intentions of pursuing a career as a general surgeon could not be fulfilled because general surgery internships were not available for women. In 1928, she found a rotating internship at the Worcester Massachusetts Memorial Hospital and returned in 1930 to continue her residency in orthopaedics after she accepted and carried out an opportunity to train in orthopaedic surgery in later 1928 under MD, Arthur Steindler (1878-1959) at the University of Iowa. After completing her residency in orthopaedics at Worcester, Jackson served as a resident physician for the Scottish Rite Hospital for Crippled Children in Dallas, Texas from 1931 to 1932. Dr. Jackson opened her own private practice in Dallas after she completed her residency in 1932. In 1933, the American Academy of Orthopaedic Surgeons was founded and would only allow Dr. Jackson, a female, into the academy if she passed the American Board of Orthopaedic Surgery examination. She became board-certified by the American Academy of Orthopaedic Surgeons in 1937. Jackson joined the staff at the Baylor University Hospital in 1939 then soon became chief at the non-school orthopaedic service at Parkland Hospital and established the hospital's first orthpaedic residency. She later opened up her own private clinic in Dallas in 1945 where she practiced orthopaedics for the remaining 38 years of her career.

Dr. Jackson was one of the founders of the Texas Orthopaedic Association in 1936. She stopped operating in 1974, but continued to examine patients until 1989. Jackson wrote the book "The Cervical Syndrome" based on her experiences of treating over 15,000 neck injuries, made numerous publications in medical journals, and invented the Jackson Cervi-Pillow to help victims of whiplash. In 1950, she was appointed to the Advisory Committee for Services to Crippled Children by Secretary of Labor, Frances Perkins.

Dr. Jackson was an expert in problems of the foot and ankle and those of the cervical spine. In 1983, the Ruth Jackson Orthopaedic Society, a support and networking group for female orthopedic surgeons, was founded in Rosemont, Illinois and was named for her. Membership in the society is open to practicing surgeons, residents, fellows, and medical students.
