= Greene County Community School District =

Public school district in Jefferson, Iowa, United States

Coordinates: 42.012586°N 94.376796°W

Location
- Jefferson, Iowa Greene County and Boone County United States
- Coordinates: 42.012586, -94.376796

District information
- Type: Local school district
- Grades: K-12
- Established: 2014
- Superintendent: Tim Christensen
- Schools: 3
- Budget: $22,425,000 (2020-21)
- NCES District ID: 1915210

Students and staff
- Students: 1259 (2022-23)
- Teachers: 95.72 FTE
- Staff: 104.67 FTE
- Student–teacher ratio: 13.15
- Athletic conference: Heart of Iowa
- District mascot: Rams
- Colors: Black and Red

Other information
- Website: www.gccsd.k12.ia.us

Greene County Community School District (GCCSD) is a rural public school district headquartered in Jefferson, Iowa.

The district is almost entirely in Greene County while small portions are in Boone County. Communities served are Jefferson, Dana, Grand Junction, Rippey and Scranton.

It formed on July 1, 2014, as the consolidation of the East Greene and Jefferson–Scranton school districts. They began "grade sharing" (in which students from one district attended school in another district for certain grade levels) the previous school year.

As of 2018, it has about 1,100 students and 200 employees.

== Schools ==
All schools are in Jefferson.

- Greene County High School
- Greene County Middle School
- Greene County Elementary School

The Greene County district continued operating the Grand Junction school until 2017. In 2017, the Grand Junction city government decided to demolish the former Grand Junction school.

The district acquired the Rippey School, which was already closed. The Rippey School was demolished in 2014.

=== Greene County High School ===
==== Athletics ====
The Rams compete in the Heart of Iowa Conference in the following sports:

- Esports
  - Rainbow Six Siege, Smash Bros Ultimate, etc
- Cross Country
- Volleyball
- Football
- Basketball
- Wrestling
- Track and Field
  - Girls' 1994 Class 2A State Champions
- Soccer
- Golf
- Baseball
- Softball

== Notable alumni ==
- Randy Weaver

== See also ==
- List of school districts in Iowa
- List of high schools in Iowa
