= Jefferson–Scranton Community School District =

Former school district in Iowa

Jefferson–Scranton Community School District or Jefferson–Scranton Community Schools (JSCS) was/is a school district headquartered in Jefferson, Greene County, Iowa, United States. It served the communities of Jefferson and Scranton, Paton-Churdan, Grand Junction and other surrounding towns.

== History ==
The district was established on July 1, 1992, by the merger of the Jefferson and Scranton school districts.

In 2001, the district had 1,422 students; this declined to 1,002 in 2013.

In the 2012 school year, it entered a grade-sharing relationship (in which students from one district attended school in another district for certain grade levels) with the East Greene Community School District. The two districts merged into the Greene County Community School District on July 1, 2014.

== Schools ==
At one time it had four schools: Jaques/South Elementary Schools (Jefferson), Scranton Elementary School, Jefferson–Scranton Middle School, and Jefferson–Scranton High School.

The Scranton school building, a K-12 school until circa 1989, had a three-story section built in 1915.

Circa 1997 it had about 277 students. The school closed in 2008; the school district had notified the city government in 2006 although gave the city two years' notice before closing the school so the city could plan for the future of the school. In 2010 the city government acquired the building, paying $1 for it, and converted it into a community center; the city government considered converting the school facility into an apartment block, but it determined it would have required too much money. The city government determined that it could not find a purpose for the 1913 section; therefore its razing occurred in 2012. The current Greene County district, as of 2014, rented the school gymnasium for athletic meetups.

The 44,000-square-foot (4,100 m^{2}) Jacques Elementary School was built in 1991–1992.

Jefferson–Scranton High had about 425 students circa 1997.
