= Jefferson, Iowa =

- City
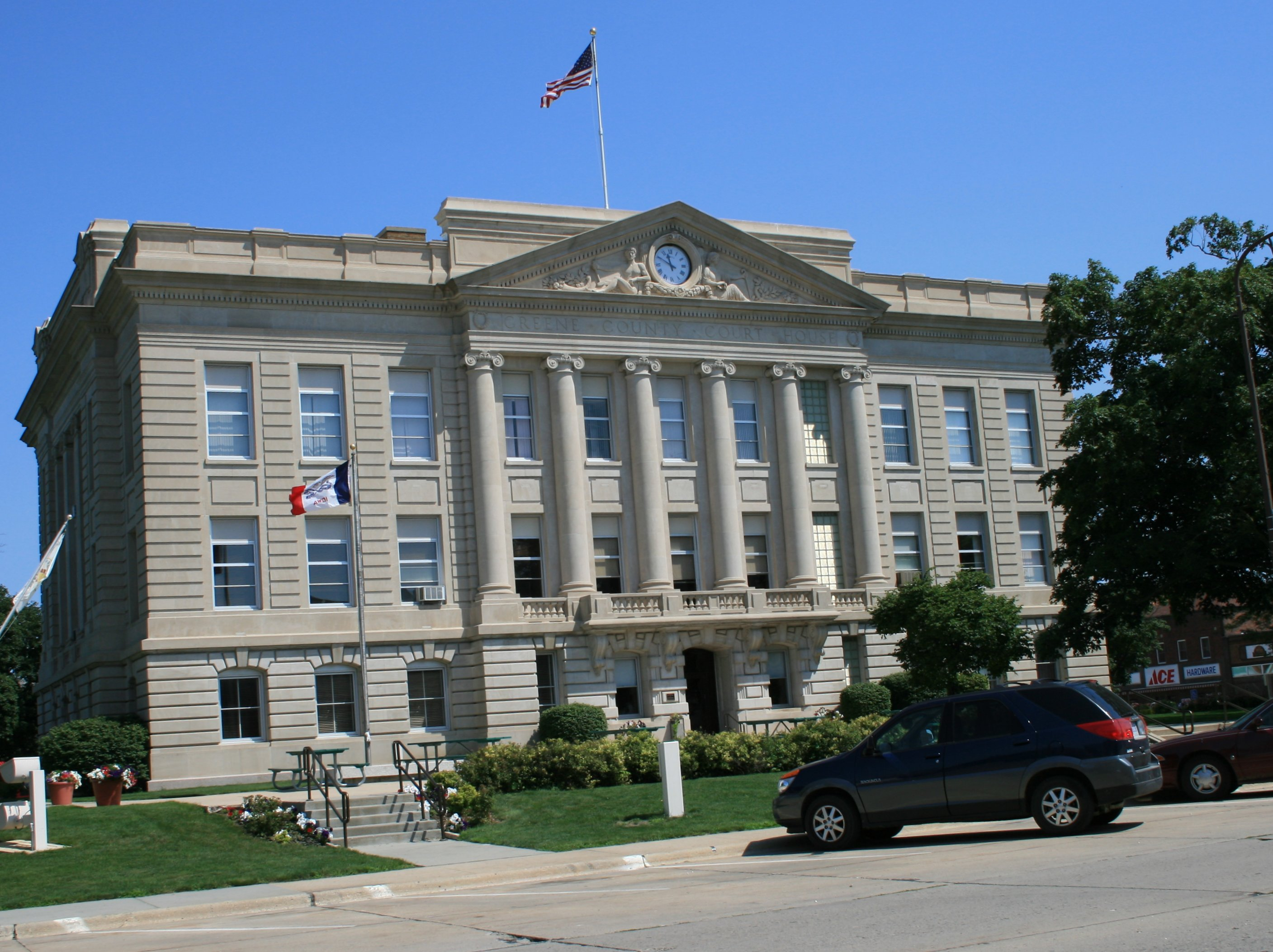
- Greene County Courthouse in Jefferson

- Location of Jefferson, Iowa
- Coordinates: 42°01′09″N 94°22′48″W
- Country: United States
- State: Iowa
- County: Greene

Area
  - Total: 6.01 sq mi (15.57 km^{2})
  - Land: 5.97 sq mi (15.46 km^{2})
  - Water: 0.039 sq mi (0.10 km^{2})
- Elevation: 1,056 ft (322 m)

Population (2020)
  - Total: 4,182
  - Density: 695.6/sq mi (268.59/km^{2})
- Time zone: UTC-6 (Central (CST))
  - Summer (DST): UTC-5 (CDT)
- ZIP code: 50129
- Area code: 515
- FIPS code: 19-39450
- GNIS feature ID: 468135
- Website: cityofjeffersoniowa.org

Jefferson is a city in, and the county seat of Greene County, Iowa, United States, along the North Raccoon River. The population was 4,182 at the time of the 2020 census. It is the home of the Mahanay Memorial Bell Tower, 168 feet (51 m) tall, located on the town square, and visible for miles. The tower is named for Floyd Mahanay, a businessman, philanthropist, and former resident. Jefferson is bisected east to west by the old Lincoln Highway (formerly U.S. 30). A new U.S. Route 30 is located approximately one mile to the north.

== History ==
While platted and settled a few years earlier, "New Jefferson" was organized in the winter of 1855–56 and officially incorporated in January 1872. It began as a farming community and remains so today. The first settlers of the new city were the family of George S. Walton who built there in 1855. During the Civil War, Jefferson as well as Greene County contributed its sons to raising Company H, 10th Iowa Infantry (1861) and Company E, 39th Iowa Infantry (1862). The railway came to Jefferson in the decades after the Civil War. Jefferson's first mayor was Mahlon Head, elected in 1872. Jefferson's library was completed in 1904 through the generosity of the Carnegie library fund. The stretch of Lincoln Highway that runs through Jefferson was completed c. 1924.

== Geography ==
According to the United States Census Bureau, the city has a total area of 6.01 square miles (15.57 km^{2}), of which 5.97 square miles (15.46 km^{2}) is land and 0.04 square miles (0.10 km^{2}) is water.

=== Climate ===
According to the Köppen Climate Classification system, Jefferson has a hot-summer humid continental climate, abbreviated "Dfa" on climate maps.

Climate data for Jefferson, Iowa, 1991–2020 normals, extremes 1893–present
Month	Jan	Feb	Mar	Apr	May	Jun	Jul	Aug	Sep	Oct	Nov	Dec	Year
Record high °F (°C)	69 (21)	76 (24)	91 (33)	96 (36)	104 (40)	104 (40)	111 (44)	107 (42)	102 (39)	96 (36)	81 (27)	71 (22)	111 (44)
Mean maximum °F (°C)	50.6 (10.3)	55.4 (13.0)	73.1 (22.8)	84.5 (29.2)	89.7 (32.1)	92.8 (33.8)	94.0 (34.4)	93.0 (33.9)	90.1 (32.3)	84.6 (29.2)	69.8 (21.0)	55.3 (12.9)	95.1 (35.1)
Mean daily maximum °F (°C)	27.6 (−2.4)	32.5 (0.3)	46.1 (7.8)	60.2 (15.7)	71.1 (21.7)	80.5 (26.9)	83.4 (28.6)	81.3 (27.4)	75.8 (24.3)	62.9 (17.2)	46.4 (8.0)	32.9 (0.5)	58.4 (14.7)
Daily mean °F (°C)	18.4 (−7.6)	22.9 (−5.1)	35.6 (2.0)	48.1 (8.9)	59.9 (15.5)	69.9 (21.1)	73.1 (22.8)	70.9 (21.6)	63.5 (17.5)	51.0 (10.6)	36.1 (2.3)	24.2 (−4.3)	47.8 (8.8)
Mean daily minimum °F (°C)	9.1 (−12.7)	13.3 (−10.4)	25.2 (−3.8)	36.0 (2.2)	48.7 (9.3)	59.3 (15.2)	62.8 (17.1)	60.4 (15.8)	51.1 (10.6)	39.1 (3.9)	25.7 (−3.5)	15.5 (−9.2)	37.2 (2.9)
Mean minimum °F (°C)	−10.7 (−23.7)	−6.5 (−21.4)	5.3 (−14.8)	22.5 (−5.3)	34.7 (1.5)	47.7 (8.7)	53.0 (11.7)	50.9 (10.5)	35.6 (2.0)	23.3 (−4.8)	9.9 (−12.3)	−3.5 (−19.7)	−13.6 (−25.3)
Record low °F (°C)	−37 (−38)	−27 (−33)	−26 (−32)	6 (−14)	19 (−7)	32 (0)	40 (4)	32 (0)	22 (−6)	−6 (−21)	−9 (−23)	−26 (−32)	−37 (−38)
Average precipitation inches (mm)	0.96 (24)	1.28 (33)	1.96 (50)	3.58 (91)	4.97 (126)	5.19 (132)	4.38 (111)	4.21 (107)	3.13 (80)	2.58 (66)	1.69 (43)	1.38 (35)	35.31 (898)
Average snowfall inches (cm)	8.2 (21)	8.2 (21)	4.8 (12)	0.9 (2.3)	0.0 (0.0)	0.0 (0.0)	0.0 (0.0)	0.0 (0.0)	0.0 (0.0)	0.6 (1.5)	1.5 (3.8)	7.5 (19)	31.7 (80.6)
Average precipitation days (≥ 0.01 in)	6.8	6.6	7.5	10.3	11.8	11.8	9.8	9.2	8.0	8.0	5.9	6.7	102.4
Average snowy days (≥ 0.1 in)	5.8	5.0	2.6	0.9	0.0	0.0	0.0	0.0	0.0	0.3	1.4	5.0	21
Source 1: NOAA
Source 2: National Weather Service

== Demographics ==
Historical population
Year	Pop.	±%
1870	779	—
1880	1,444	+85.4%
1890	1,875	+29.8%
1900	2,601	+38.7%
1910	2,477	−4.8%
1920	3,416	+37.9%
1930	3,431	+0.4%
1940	4,088	+19.1%
1950	4,326	+5.8%
1960	4,570	+5.6%
1970	4,735	+3.6%
1980	4,854	+2.5%
1990	4,292	−11.6%
2000	4,626	+7.8%
2010	4,345	−6.1%
2020	4,182	−3.8%
Source: "U.S. Census website". United States Census Bureau. Source: U.S. Decennial Census

=== 2020 census ===
As of the 2020 census, there were 4,182 people, 1,872 households, and 1,116 families residing in the city. The population density was 695.1 inhabitants per square mile (268.4/km^{2}). There were 2,091 housing units at an average density of 347.6 per square mile (134.2/km^{2}); 10.5% of housing units were vacant, with a homeowner vacancy rate of 2.5% and a rental vacancy rate of 13.3%. 0.0% of residents lived in urban areas, while 100.0% lived in rural areas.

Of the 1,872 households, 24.9% had children under the age of 18 living with them, 44.6% were married-couple households, 5.4% were cohabiting-couple households, 32.2% had a female householder with no spouse or partner present, and 17.9% had a male householder with no spouse or partner present. 40.4% of households were non-families, 36.8% of households were made up of individuals, and 19.8% had someone living alone who was 65 years of age or older.

The median age in the city was 45.0 years. 22.4% of residents were under the age of 18 and 25.9% were 65 years of age or older. Age distribution was 24.5% under the age of 20, 4.5% from 20 to 24, 21.0% from 25 to 44, and 24.1% from 45 to 64. For every 100 females there were 88.8 males, and for every 100 females age 18 and over there were 84.8 males age 18 and over. The gender makeup of the city was 47.0% male and 53.0% female.

Racial composition as of the 2020 census
Race	Number	Percent
White	3,895	93.1%
Black or African American	20	0.5%
American Indian and Alaska Native	6	0.1%
Asian	31	0.7%
Native Hawaiian and Other Pacific Islander	1	0.0%
Some other race	53	1.3%
Two or more races	176	4.2%
Hispanic or Latino (of any race)	155	3.7%

=== 2010 census ===
As of the census of 2010, there were 4,345 people, 1,900 households, and 1,172 families living in the city. The population density was 727.8 inhabitants per square mile (281.0/km^{2}). There were 2,156 housing units at an average density of 361.1 per square mile (139.4/km^{2}). The racial makeup of the city was 97.9% White, 0.1% African American, 0.1% Native American, 0.2% Asian, 1.0% from other races, and 0.7% from two or more races. Hispanic or Latino of any race were 2.3% of the population.

There were 1,900 households, of which 26.5% had children under the age of 18 living with them, 47.9% were married couples living together, 9.8% had a female householder with no husband present, 3.9% had a male householder with no wife present, and 38.3% were non-families. 34.8% of all households were made up of individuals, and 20% had someone living alone who was 65 years of age or older. The average household size was 2.21 and the average family size was 2.81.

The median age in the city was 46.3 years. 22.5% of residents were under the age of 18; 6.4% were between the ages of 18 and 24; 19.3% were from 25 to 44; 27.5% were from 45 to 64; and 24.2% were 65 years of age or older. The gender makeup of the city was 47.4% male and 52.6% female.

=== 2000 census ===
As of the census of 2000, there were 4,626 people, 1,954 households, and 1,234 families living in the city. The population density was 794.6 inhabitants per square mile (306.8/km^{2}). There were 2,094 housing units at an average density of 359.7 per square mile (138.9/km^{2}). The racial makeup of the city was 97.97% White, 0.15% African American, 0.24% Native American, 0.39% Asian, 0.02% Pacific Islander, 0.61% from other races, and 0.63% from two or more races. Hispanic or Latino of any race were 1.73% of the population.

There were 1,954 households, out of which 28.1% had children under the age of 18 living with them, 51.5% were married couples living together, 8.6% had a female householder with no husband present, and 36.8% were non-families. 33.7% of all households were made up of individuals, and 20.9% had someone living alone who was 65 years of age or older. The average household size was 2.26 and the average family size was 2.88.

Age spread: 23.7% under the age of 18, 5.9% from 18 to 24, 22.9% from 25 to 44, 21.1% from 45 to 64, and 26.4% who were 65 years of age or older. The median age was 43 years. For every 100 females, there were 83.8 males. For every 100 females age 18 and over, there were 78.4 males.

The median income for a household in the city was $32,818, and the median income for a family was $42,754. Males had a median income of $32,206 versus $21,359 for females. The per capita income for the city was $17,441. About 3.3% of families and 7.3% of the population were below the poverty line, including 7.6% of those under age 18 and 7.7% of those age 65 or over.

== Arts and culture ==
=== Mahanay Memorial Bell Tower ===
Completed in October 1966 at nearly 14 stories or 168 feet (51 m) in height, the Mahanay Memorial Bell Tower is named for Floyd Mahanay who left an endowment of $350,000 to have the tower built. However, the funds were not sufficient to provide for a full carillon of bells on top. In 2016, upon the 50th anniversary of the tower being built, $440,905 funds were acquired to add a four-octave, 47-bell carillon at the top of the tower. The bells were expected to be chiming the summer of 2017 and operated by a digital piano to give tunes for weddings, birthdays, funerals and even the local high school's fight song after games. Every 15 minutes, the tower provides the time with a recording of the Westminster Chimes. An elevator in the tower takes visitors to the observation deck which overlooks five Iowa counties. As of 2016, there were more than seventeen other buildings in Iowa taller than the Mahanay Tower: 12 in Des Moines, 3 in Cedar Rapids, and 2 in Davenport.

=== Star Trek ===
In the Star Trek: Discovery episode "Choose Your Pain" Jefferson is mentioned as the location of a classified facility where the specification on spore drives had been sent so more units could be built.

=== Festivals ===
Since 1980 annually on the second Saturday of June, the Bell Tower Festival has a parade in the morning and a street dance in the evening.

== Education ==
Residents are in the Greene County Community School District, which operates Greene County Elementary, Greene County Middle, and Greene County High schools in Jefferson.

It was part of the Jefferson School District until July 1, 1992, when that district merged into the Jefferson–Scranton Community School District. It was a part of Jefferson–Scranton until it merged into the Greene County district on July 1, 2014.

== Notable people ==
- Johnny Case – Professional mixed martial artist
- George Gallup – Developer of the Gallup poll
- William Cook Hanson – Federal District Judge (Southern Dist. of Iowa)
- Darrell R. Lindsey – Posthumous recipient of the Medal of Honor
- Dick Oatts – Jazz saxophonist
- Bryce Paup – Professional football player (1990–2000)
- Loren Shriver – Astronaut
- Randy Weaver – Participant in Ruby Ridge standoff
- Doreen Wilber – Gold Medal winner in archery at the 1972 Olympics
- Chad Elliott – American Folk singer

== See also ==
- George H. Gallup House
- Greene County Courthouse
- KGRA
- Raccoon River Valley Trail
