= Siouxland =

Region of the United States

Coordinates: 43.0°N 96.4°W

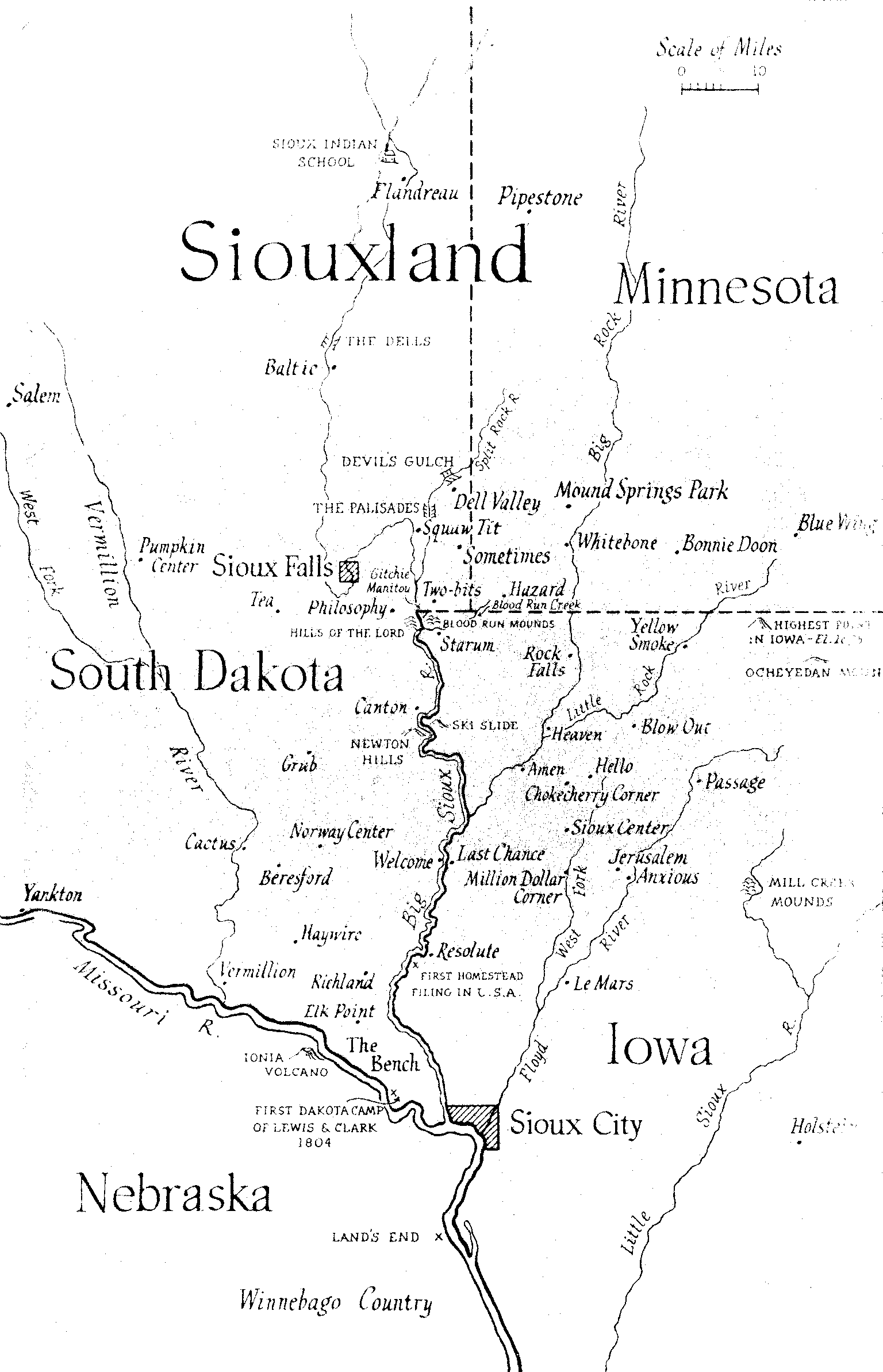
Map of Siouxland from the novel "This Is the Year" by Feike Feikema (Frederick Manfred), who defined "this area where state lines have not been important" and coined the name in 1946

Siouxland is a vernacular region that encompasses the entire Big Sioux River drainage basin in the U.S. states of South Dakota, Minnesota, Nebraska and Iowa. The demonym for a resident of Siouxland is Siouxlander.

A "vernacular region" is a distinctive area where the inhabitants collectively consider themselves interconnected by a shared history, mutual interests, and a common identity. Such regions are "intellectual inventions" and a form of shorthand to identify things, people, and places. Vernacular regions reflect a "sense of place," but rarely coincide with established jurisdictional borders.

The lower Big Sioux River drainage basin stretches from Sioux City, Iowa, to Sioux Falls, South Dakota, an area that includes much of northwestern Iowa, the northeast corner of Nebraska, the southeast corner of South Dakota, and the extreme southwest corner of Minnesota.

The term "Siouxland" was coined by author Frederick Manfred in 1946. Manfred was born in Doon, Iowa, a small town in Lyon County.

== Origin ==
Frederick Manfred, who grew up in this region, set his novels in Minnesota, South Dakota, Iowa, and Nebraska, but these names alone did not meet his needs. Manfred said, "I wanted to find one name that meant this area where state lines have not been important. I tried Land of the Sioux, but that was too long, so Siouxland was born" in 1946.

The following year, it was first used in the prologue to Manfred's third novel, This Is the Year—

The cock robin winged on, north.

At last, in late March, he arrived in Siouxland. He wheeled over the oak-crested, doming hills north of Sioux City, flew up the Big Sioux River, resting in elms and basswoods....

Time magazine, reviewing the novel on 31 March 1947, introduced Siouxland to its readers by quoting from the book: "By a river in the Siouxland he stood weeping." By the summer of 1948, Alex Stoddard, sports editor of the Sioux City Journal, had begun referring to "Siouxland teams." Soon after Manfred's fictional naming of Siouxland, commercial and political entities adopted the name and made it widely known.

Orlyn A. Swartz, who came to Sioux City in 1948, purchased the local office of O'Dea Finance Co. and renamed it Siouxland Finance Co. Swartz told Book Remarks that the idea was so new that he asked Harold Murphey, of the Chamber of Commerce, if there would be any objection to using the name. What was perhaps the first business application of Siouxland was still in use after four decades (in 1991), in Siouxland Insurance Agency, a successor company.

A sampling of telephone directories (completed in 1991) showed two businesses using Siouxland in 1950 and nine in 1953, two of which were spelled Sioux Land. By contrast, in the 1990 Sioux City telephone directory there were sixty-five listings under Siouxland, including spelling variants (Sioux Land, Sooland, and Soo Land), and another eleven in the 1990 Sioux Falls telephone directory.

== Boundaries ==
As a vernacular region, the boundaries of Siouxland have no official designation. As the term is frequently used by Sioux City media, it is often assumed that Siouxland is roughly synonymous with the Sioux City area, but not everyone agrees with this assumption. The Sioux City media bias towards Sioux City was illustrated in January 1990, when a letter to the Sioux City Journal asked, "Just where is Siouxland?" The writer, a resident of Ida Grove, was disputing that the "first baby born in Siouxland" was born in Sioux City at 3:30 a.m. on January 1, because a baby was born in Ida Grove at 1:42 a.m. the same day.

As residents of the Sioux Falls area wanted their own regional name, they adopted Sioux Empire. Manfred, in a 1991 interview with Book Remarks, expressed disappointment that so many residents of Sioux Falls believed Siouxland to mean Sioux City, to the extent that they came up with a new name of Sioux Empire. Manfred drew a map of Siouxland for the cover of This Is the Year; his version encompassed the lower Big Sioux River drainage basin. At that time, Manfred lived in Luverne, Minnesota, which he considered to be part of Siouxland.

In 1995, Siouxland Libraries—sometimes called the Siouxland Public Library—was created out of the merger of the Sioux Falls Public Library and the Minnehaha County Rural Public Library.

"Just where is Siouxland?" The answer varies geographically. Like most vernacular regions, Siouxland is more-or-less where one wants it to be—or where popular perception places it.

== Major cities ==
The two largest Siouxland cities are Sioux Falls, South Dakota, and Sioux City, Iowa. Another prominent city in this area is Norfolk, Nebraska, a major commercial area of northeast Nebraska, but this city is marginally in what is considered to be Siouxland.

=== Sioux Empire ===
The area around Sioux Falls (the metropolitan area including the counties of Minnehaha County, Lincoln County, McCook County, and Turner County) is often referred to as the "Sioux Empire." This region (which includes adjacent areas in the southwest corner of Minnesota) is part of Manfred's original conception of Siouxland.

== Siouxland cities ==
Cities that are usually considered part of Siouxland include:

=== Iowa ===
- Akron, Iowa
- Bronson, Iowa
- Cherokee, Iowa
- Climbing Hill, Iowa
- Correctionville, Iowa
- Denison, Iowa
- Hawarden, Iowa
- Hinton, Iowa
- Hornick, Iowa
- Hull, Iowa
- Ida Grove, Iowa
- Kingsley, Iowa
- LeMars, Iowa
- Lawton, Iowa
- Little Sioux, Iowa
- Merrill, Iowa
- Moville, Iowa
- Okoboji, Iowa
- Onawa, Iowa
- Orange City, Iowa
- Rock Rapids, Iowa
- Rock Valley, Iowa
- Sac City, Iowa
- Salix, Iowa
- Sergeant Bluff, Iowa
- Sheldon, Iowa
- Sioux Center, Iowa
- Sioux City, Iowa
- Sloan, Iowa
- Spencer, Iowa
- Storm Lake, Iowa

=== Minnesota ===
- Luverne, Minnesota

=== Nebraska ===
- Allen, Nebraska
- Bancroft, Nebraska
- Beemer, Nebraska
- Coleridge, Nebraska
- Dakota City, Nebraska
- Hartington, Nebraska
- Homer, Nebraska
- Hoskins, Nebraska
- Magnet, Nebraska
- Maskell, Nebraska
- Newcastle, Nebraska
- Norfolk, Nebraska
- Obert, Nebraska
- Pender, Nebraska
- Pierce, Nebraska
- Pilger, Nebraska
- Ponca, Nebraska
- Rosalie, Nebraska
- South Sioux City, Nebraska
- Stanton, Nebraska
- St. Helena, Nebraska
- Wakefield, Nebraska
- Walthill, Nebraska
- Wayne, Nebraska
- West Point, Nebraska
- Winnebago, Nebraska
- Winside, Nebraska
- Wisner, Nebraska
- Wynot, Nebraska

=== South Dakota ===
- Beresford, South Dakota
- Brandon, South Dakota
- Canton, South Dakota
- Dakota Dunes, South Dakota
- Elk Point, South Dakota
- Gayville, South Dakota
- Jefferson, South Dakota
- North Sioux City, South Dakota
- Sioux Falls, South Dakota
- Vermillion, South Dakota
- Yankton, South Dakota

== See also ==
- Great Sioux Reservation
- Great Sioux Nation
- Republic of Lakotah
