= Maple Valley Conference =

Former Iowa High School athletic conference

The Maple Valley Conference was a high school sports league in western Iowa. Most of its members are classified as 1A, the smallest grouping of schools in Iowa. However, a few of the schools compete in the next-largest class, 2A. The conference was formed in 1931 (95 years ago) and existed for 77 years before merging with the Boyer Valley Conference in 2008 (18 years ago).

== Schools ==
School	Location	Mascot	Colors	9-11 Enrollment (2012-2013)
BC-IG	Ida Grove	Falcons		215
Kingsley-Pierson	Kingsley	Panthers		108
Lawton-Bronson	Lawton	Eagles		141
MV/A-O	Mapleton	Rams		175
Odebolt-Arthur	Odebolt	Trojans		108
Galva-Holstein	Holstein	Pirates		197
Remsen-Union	Remsen	Rockets		104
River Valley	Correctionville	Wolverines		79
Westwood	Sloan	Rebels		110
West Monona	Onawa	Spartans		146
Whiting	Whiting	Warriors		44
Woodbury Central	Moville	Wildcats		142

== History ==
The Maple Valley Conference traces its history to 1931 when the conference was founded with Onawa, Mapleton, Moville, Correctionville, Holstein, and Odebolt high schools. Kingsley joined the conference in 1944 and over time, the conference grew to 12 members so that by 2008 the conference included Odebolt-Arthur, Battle Creek-Ida Grove, Galva-Holstein, Woodbury Central, Kingsley-Pierson, Remsen-Union, Lawton-Bronson, Westwood, River Valley, Maple Valley-Anthon-Oto, West Monona, and Whiting. Due to declining enrollment at many schools in western Iowa, the league decided to explore options for expansion in 2008. The Boyer Valley Conference, which had recently gone through a series of mergers, reached out to the conference regarding a merger. Following a 10-1 favorable vote from the Maple Valley schools, the Western Valley Activities Conference was officially formed.

== Successes ==
Dating back to the 1920s, OA-BCIG (then Ida Grove), has been one of the strongest women's basketball programs in the state. The school's lineage includes 20 trips to the state tournament, four state championships (including the 2011 state title) and two runner-up finishes. Additionally, Odebolt-Arthur won four championships in cross country in the 1960s and 1970s, Battle Creek won two state softball titles, and Ida Grove holds two state titles in track & field. Ridge View also boasts a strong tradition in women's basketball, with 14 state appearances. Kingsley-Pierson boasts state titles in boys' golf (1987), boys' track & field (1978), and softball (1966 and 1967). Eastwood, now River Valley, won the 1978 Class 1A State Football title. Woodbury Central won the state title in football in 1980, the state track title in 1963, and the softball title in 2002. Lawton-Bronson claim the 1A track title in 1991 and the 1925 state basketball title. West Monona won the 1964 Girls Basketball Championship and the 2005 men's golf title (Coached by Josh Madsen. Anthon won the 1949 Fall Baseball State title.
