= Western Valley Activities Conference =

Iowa High School athletic conference

- Conference: IHSAA / IGHSAU
- Founded: 2008
- No. of teams: 10
- Region: Western Iowa
- Website: www.westernvalleyconference.org

The Western Valley Activities Conference is an athletic conference for small high schools in Western Iowa. Formed in 2008 from the merger of the longstanding Maple Valley Conference and Boyer Valley Conference, the league now consists of 9 schools from the old Maple Valley Conference and Siouxland Christian.

== Current members ==
School	Location	Mascot	Colors	2026-2027 BEDS
Kingsley–Pierson	Kingsley	Panthers		97
Lawton–Bronson	Lawton	Eagles		206
MVAOCOU	Mapleton	Rams		162
OABCIG	Ida Grove	Falcons		219
Ridge View	Holstein	Raptors		163
River Valley	Correctionville	Wolverines		56
Siouxland Christian	Sioux City	Eagles		87
West Monona	Onawa	Spartans		105
Westwood	Sloan	Rebels		133
Woodbury Central	Moville	Wildcats		122

== History ==
The Western Valley Activities Conference was formed in 2008 with the merger of the Maple Valley Conference and the Boyer Valley Conference. The Maple Valley Conference traces its history to 1931 when the conference was founded with Onawa, Mapleton, Moville, Correctionville, Holstein, and Odebolt high schools. Kingsley joined the conference in 1944 and over time, the conference grew to 12 members so that by the time of the merger the conference included Odebolt–Arthur, Battle Creek–Ida Grove, Galva–Holstein, Woodbury Central, Kingsley–Pierson, Remsen-Union, Lawton–Bronson, Westwood, River Valley, Maple Valley–Anthon–Oto, West Monona, and Whiting.

The Boyer Valley Conference had been formed around 1960 and had many schools to consolidation over the years. After peaking at 12 schools, the conference was left with only eight in its final year of 2007: Ar-We-Va, Boyer Valley, Charter Oak–Ute, IKM, Logan-Magnolia, Manning, West Harrison, and Woodbine. With IKM and Manning entering a sport-sharing agreement, it looked like the right time for many of its members to find a new home.

In 2008, the Maple Valley Conference agreed to merge with the Boyer Valley Activities Conference by a 10–1 vote, with only Woodbury Central opposing and Lawton–Bronson abstaining. The new 19-team league would work together not only in athletics, but in music and speech as well, as the former BVAC had. In addition most of the old rivalries were kept intact by splitting the conference into two divisions with the old Maple Valley basically making up the north and the former Boyer Valley plus Whiting and West Monona forming the south.

== State champions ==
2009 1A wrestling- Logan-Magnolia

2009 2A girls basketball- IKM-Manning

2011 2A girls basketball- OABCIG

2017 2A boys track and field- Kingsley–Pierson/Woodbury Central

2019 2A football- OABCIG

2020 1A football- OABCIG

2026 A football- Woodbury Central

== Membership changes ==
After the 2008 season, Odebolt–Arthur and Battle Creek–Ida Grove entered into a full-grade sharing agreement. Following the 2009 season, Remsen-Union left the conference, and starting in 2010, Galva–Holstein began sharing all high school functions and classes with nearby Schaller-Crestland High School, forming the new Ridge View High School, which remained in the conference.

The conference, which had spanned more than 160 miles, lost many members for the 2013–14 school year. Logan-Magnolia and IKM-Manning, the two largest schools in the southern half of the conference, moved to the Western Iowa Conference. Meanwhile, the other former Boyer Valley Conference members are joining with Coon Rapids–Bayard and five members of the Rolling Hills Conference to form the Rolling Valley Conference. Whiting moved to the Frontier Conference of Nebraska.

In 2017, Charter Oak–Ute students returned to the conference by entering into a whole grade sharing agreement with Maple Valley–Anthon–Oto.

In August 2023, Kingsley-Pierson and River Valley school districts agreed to combine teams for football, with both having competed in the 8-player division for years. The combined rosters, competing as KP-RV, allowed the team to qualify for an 11-player division. In October 2023, the school districts agreed to combine all athletic teams under the KP-RV name. This agreement was then severed in April 2024, due to Kingsley-Pierson parents pressure on the school board to end it. The agreement will drop for all sports except for football following the end of the 2023-2024 athletic season.

=== Former Members ===
School	Location	Mascot	Colors	Years	Current
Ar-We-Va	Westside	Rockets		2008–2013	Rolling Valley Conference
Boyer Valley	Dunlap	Bulldogs		2008–2013	Rolling Valley Conference
Charter Oak–Ute	Charter Oak	Bobcats		2008–2013	Dropped high school, sends grades 9-12 to MVAO
IKM-Manning	Manning	Wolves		2008–2013	Western Iowa Conference
Logan-Magnolia	Logan	Panthers		2008–2013	Western Iowa Conference
Remsen-Union	Remsen	Rockets		2008–2009	Whole-grade sharing agreement with MMC, War Eagle Conference
West Harrison	Mondamin	Hawkeyes		2008–2013	Rolling Valley Conference
Whiting	Whiting	Warriors		2008–2014	Frontier Conference of Nebraska
Woodbine	Woodbine	Tigers		2008–2013	Rolling Valley Conference
