= Iowa Highway 140 =

State highway in Iowa, United States

Iowa Highway 140
- Iowa 140 highlighted in red

Route information
- Maintained by Iowa DOT
- Length: 25.309 mi (40.731 km)
- Existed: July 1, 1926–present

Major junctions
- South end: US 20 at Moville
- North end: Iowa 3 near Remsen

Location
- Country: United States
- State: Iowa
- Counties: Woodbury; Plymouth

Highway system
- Iowa Primary Highway System; Interstate; US; State; Secondary; Scenic
← Iowa 139	→ Iowa 141

Iowa Highway 140 (Iowa 140) is a 25-mile-long (40 km) state highway in northwestern Iowa. The route begins at U.S. Highway 20 (US 20) at Moville. It heads northeast and then due north; it ends at Iowa 3 near Remsen.

== Route description ==
Iowa Highway 140 begins at U.S. Highway 20 at Moville. It goes northeast through Moville towards Kingsley adjacent to the Little Sioux River. At Kingsley, Iowa 140 turns north and continues north for 16 miles (26 km) until it intersects Iowa Highway 3 southeast of Remsen, where it ends.

== History ==
Iowa 140 was created on July 1, 1926, when the U.S. Highway System was created. The highway has previously been Primary Road No. 30, but it was renumbered to avoid confusion with the new US 30. Upon creation, the route was largely the same as it is today. In 1931, Iowa 140 was extended south to Hornick and west to US 75 at Sloan. It was extended west again in 1958 when I-29 was built, making its length 53 miles (85 km). In 1961, Iowa 141's western end was redirected away from Sioux City and directed to Sloan via Hornick on Iowa 140. Upon this designation, Iowa 140 was truncated at Hornick. Three years later, Iowa 140 was truncated south of US 20, to its current extent, only to be truncated north of Kingsley the next year. From 1965 to 1980, Iowa 140 was a 9-mile-long (14 km) spur route. Iowa 140 was restored to its current extent in 1980.

== Major intersections ==
County	Location	mi	km	Destinations	Notes
Woodbury	Moville	0.000	0.000	US 20 – Sioux City, Holstein	
Plymouth	Remsen	25.309	40.731	Iowa 3 – Le Mars, Cherokee	
1.000 mi = 1.609 km; 1.000 km = 0.621 mi
