= Westwood Community School District (Iowa) =

Public school district in Sloan, Iowa, United States

Coordinates: 42.230116°N 96.217168°W

Location
- Sloan, Iowa Monona County and Woodbury County United States
- Coordinates: 42.230116, -96.217168

District information
- Type: Local school district
- Grades: K-12
- Established: 1961
- Superintendent: Jay D. Lutt
- Schools: 2
- Budget: $9,619,000 (2020-21)
- NCES District ID: 1931470

Students and staff
- Students: 625 (2022-23)
- Teachers: 46.06 FTE
- Staff: 54.72 FTE
- Student–teacher ratio: 13.57
- Athletic conference: Western Valley Activities Conference
- District mascot: Rebels
- Colors: Blue and Gold

Other information
- Website: www.wwrebels.org

The Westwood Community School District is a rural public school district headquartered in Sloan, Iowa. It spans northern Monona County and southern Woodbury County It serves the towns of Sloan, Hornick, Salix, Smithland, and the surrounding rural areas.

The district was created in 1961, from the consolidation of Sloan, Salix, Smithland and Holly-Springs-Hornick.

== Schools ==
The district operates two schools in a single facility in Sloan:

- Westwood Elementary School
- Westwood High School

=== Westwood High School ===
==== Athletics ====
The Rebels compete in the Western Valley Activities Conference in the following sports:

- Cross Country
- Volleyball
- Football
- Basketball
- Track and Field
- Golf
- Baseball
- Softball
- Wrestling
- Archery

Students can also participate in Soccer with Sergeant Bluff-Luton.

== Modern history ==
The first superintendent of the newly consolidated Westwood CSD was E.V. Heacock. He served for five years. The first people on the school board were President Warren Johnson of Sloan, Orval K. Cox of Hornick, Cyr Miquelon of Salix, Norman Stickney of Smithland, Alvin Sulsberger of Holly Springs. The board took one year to get organized while the other schools kept their education going. It took 17 years to get the new school building vote passed. The new K-12 Westwood building was built in 1988. Upon consolidation, the name “Westwood” was chosen for a community likeness towards the UCLA Bruins who are located in the Westwood region of Los Angeles, California. Hence, the Columbia Blue and Gold Colors were also adopted. In 1995, the school colors changed from Columbia Blue and Gold to Royal Blue and Gold. The mascot “Rebel” was named after a high school student's dog. The student’s name was Rick Watson and he entered the name “Rebel” into a contest and it was selected as the winner. “Willie The Rebel” is the mascot along with the icon, “swords.” Diane Miller designed and drew Willie The Rebel.

== Early history ==
=== Salix ===
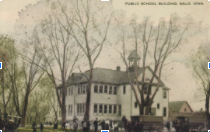
Original Salix School

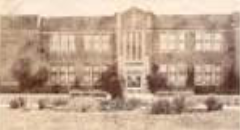
Second Salix School Building

In 1880, the school authorities of Liberty Township purchased a quarter block of land at the southwest corner of the intersection of Willow and Tipton Streets and erected the first school building in Salix.

On April 7, 1920, eight acres on the south edge of Salix, were purchased from the Harrington family for a new school site. The school was occupied on April 1, 1929. The land is currently a city park today.

In 1961, the Salix Public School became a part of the newly organized Westwood Community School District. The Salix School building continued to serve the K-6th grades until 1988.

=== Sloan ===
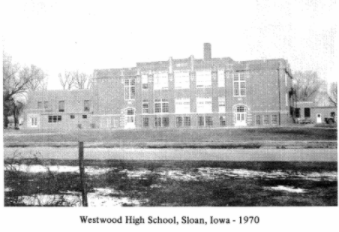
Sloan High School Building

The first school in Sloan was held on the second floor of the grocery store owned by Evans and Beall, with the first schoolteacher as Miss L. Hosmer. Church was also held on the second floor. A larger school building was constructed in 1916, that operated as a K-12. Carl Burris was superintendent during the 1920’s. In 1940, a new gymnasium was constructed for the Sloan Raiders basketball team. By 1949, enrollment had increased to 334, making Sloan Consolidated school the largest school in the county. Homecoming was first celebrated during the 1948-49 basketball season, with Marilyn Henry as the first homecoming queen. The Sloan “Raiders” retired their name in 1962 as the consolidation of Sloan, Hornick, Holly Springs, Salix, and Smithland happened. Although Westwood consolidated in 1961, they did not adopt the mascot “Rebels” until the next year. The old Sloan school building was torn down in the 1990s.

=== Holly Springs ===
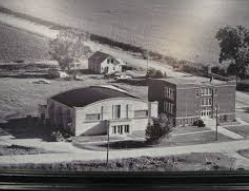
Holly Springs School Building

The Holly Springs school closed in the 1960s as the Westwood Community School District was formed. Now, the auditorium and gymnasium (the building on the left of the picture) still stand today on old Highway 141. Currently it is an auto parts business. The building on the right side of the school got torn down.

=== Hornick ===
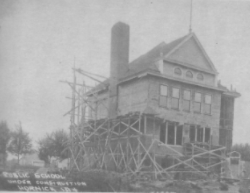
Original Hornick school building under construction

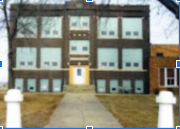
Second Hornick school building

The original Hornick school was a two room building. Currently, there are houses where the school used to be. The original school cost $5,000 to build. Some students rode on a bus pulled by horses to get to school. In 1916, the school added 11th and 12th grades. With that, they also built a new school building. In 1917, the new school building caught fire and burnt down. One year later they built a replica of the first school. Where the school was located is currently where the Hornick city park is today. When the Holly Springs school closed the 6-8th grade, it divided the K-5 with Hornick and Salix.

=== Smithland ===
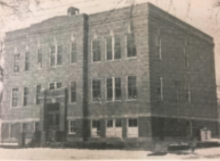
Smithland school building

Smithland is one of the oldest towns in northwest Iowa. The first teacher at the Smithland school was Hannah Van Dorn. In 1854 when the Cornelius Van Dorn family moved into the Smithland area, Mr. Smith found a school teacher; Van Dorn’s daughter, Hannah, and promptly rallied the men of the community . Within 5 days, they had raised the first log cabin schoolhouse on what records state is tot 10, block 2, Smithland. (Roy Gambs, in 1958, noted this should be recorded to read Lots 7 and 8 Block 2.) The Smithland school house was the first schoolhouse in Woodbury county and was built of hewed cotton logs; the floors and doors were cottonwood puncheon. There were 23 students and Miss Van Dorn received $2.00 per week, paid by the school patrons in the proportion to the number of students in attendance. Mr. O.B Smith boarded her free of charge. In 1859, Elijah Adams built a new frame schoolhouse and in the late 1860’s, the ladies of Smithland, through the community club socials, raised money to buy a bell for the new school. The bell was ordered from the Ohio foundry at the considerable cost of $114.00. It was shipped to Dension, the nearest railroad town, and hauled to Smithland by Joe’ Bowers’ mule team. The inscription on the bell reads; “Buckeye Bell Factory, 1869, Vanduken and Tiet, Cincinnati.” In 1876 a large two-story school house was erected. It was a two-story frame, 50x60 feet with ceilings fourteen feet high, and was ventilated by means of double chimneys. The lower story was divided into two rooms, each having a seating capacity of fifty pupils. The upper story was one room, and contained seats for 100 pupils. The school was graded and had a three years’ high school course.

The enrollment for 1889 was enlarged to 190, with an average of 160. In 1913 the present school house was erected. Each time, the bell was moved and employed to call the students to classes. The bell was retired at 84 in 1954 and in 1964 was placed in Memorial Park beside the first school house. Tragically, in 1969 the bell was stolen from the memorial park and never recovered. 1880 was the first graduating class with Regina Gambs Genness as the only graduate. The superintendent for that year was J.S Shoup. Since then there have been graduates all but for 13 years, the last year without graduates was 1902.

== See also ==
- List of school districts in Iowa
- List of high schools in Iowa
