= Ryan Grubb =

American football coach (born 1976)

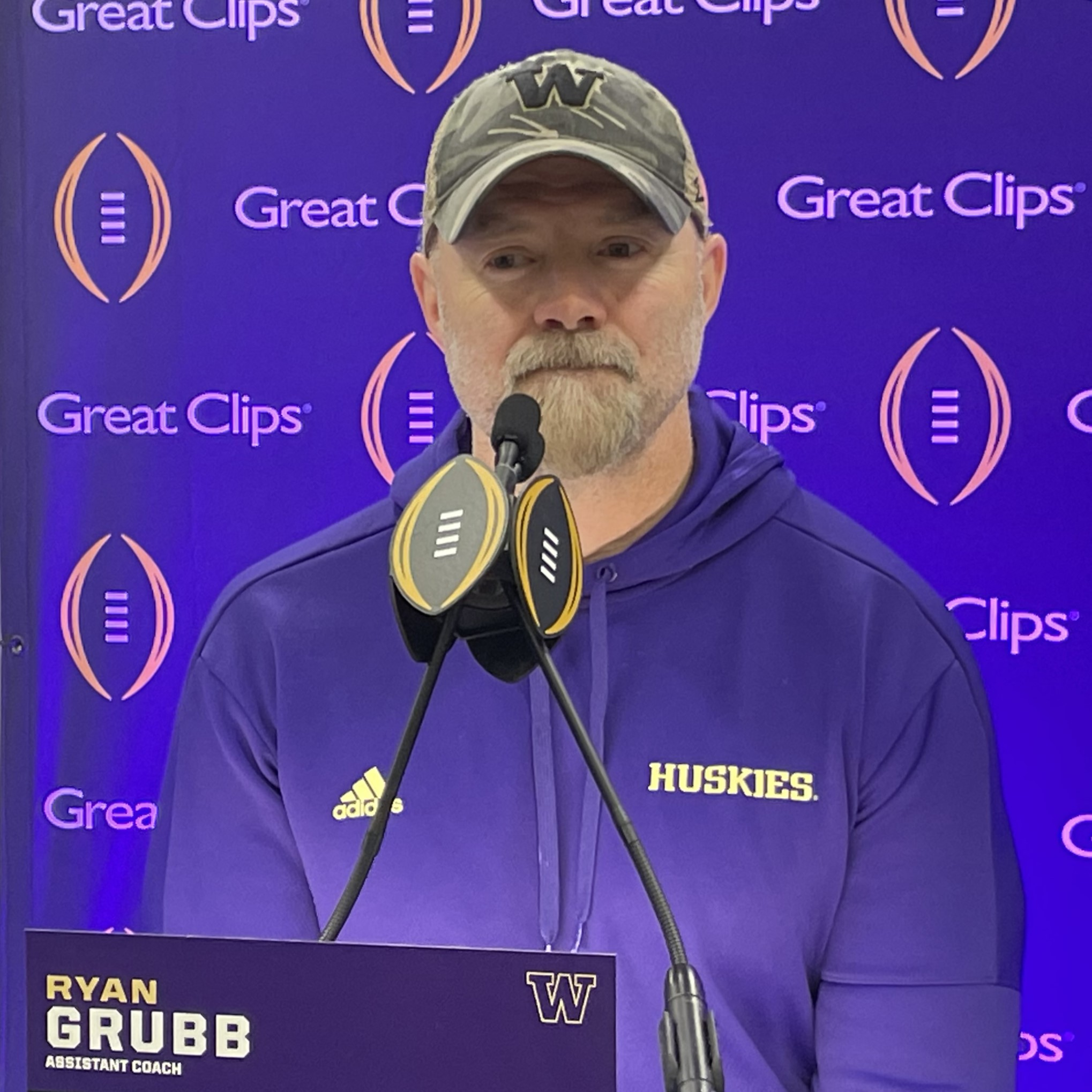
- Grubb talking to press ahead of the 2024 CFP National Championship.

Current position
- Title: Offensive coordinator
- Team: Alabama
- Conference: SEC

Biographical details
- Born: April 16, 1976 (age 50); Kingsley, Iowa, U.S.
- Education: Buena Vista University (BBA); South Dakota State University (MS)

Playing career
- 1994–1997: Buena Vista
- Positions: Running back, wide receiver

Coaching career (HC unless noted)
- 2003–2004: Kingsley–Pierson HS (IA) (OC)
- 2005: South Dakota State (RB)
- 2006: South Dakota State (WR)
- 2007–2009: Sioux Falls (OL/RGC)
- 2010–2013: Sioux Falls (OC/QB)
- 2014–2016: Eastern Michigan (OL)
- 2017–2018: Fresno State (OL/RGC)
- 2019: Fresno State (AHC/OC/OL)
- 2020–2021: Fresno State (AHC/OC/QB)
- 2022–2023: Washington (AHC/OC/QB)
- 2024: Seattle Seahawks (OC)
- 2025–present: Alabama (OC)

Ryan Grubb (born April 16, 1976) is an American football coach who currently serves as the offensive coordinator at the University of Alabama. He previously served as the offensive coordinator and quarterbacks coach at the University of Washington from 2022 to 2023 as well as the Seattle Seahawks in 2024. Grubb played college football at Buena Vista University as a running back and wide receiver from 1994 to 1997. Prior to his tenure for the Seattle Seahawks, Grubb previously served as an assistant coach at the University of Washington, California State University, Fresno, Eastern Michigan University, the University of Sioux Falls and South Dakota State University.

== Playing career ==
Grubb played football while attending Kingsley–Pierson High School. Later, from 1994 to 1997, he attended Buena Vista University, where he played running back and wide receiver for the Beavers. He was a four-year starter and served as team captain during his time at Buena Vista.

== Coaching career ==
=== Early coaching career ===
Grubb's coaching career began in 2003, when he took a position at his alma mater, Kingsley–Pierson High School, as offensive coordinator. In his second of two seasons at Kingsley–Pierson, Grubb was named the Iowa High School Athletic Association Class 1A Assistant Coach of the Year. After departing, he moved to the NCAA Division I ranks; while pursuing his master's degree, Grubb served on the coaching staff for at South Dakota State – in 2005 as their running backs coach and in 2006 as their wide receivers coach. Among the players he coached at South Dakota State was JaRon Harris, who would later be named to an NFL practice squad.

=== Sioux Falls ===
In 2007, he took a position at Sioux Falls under head coach Kalen DeBoer, where he would remain for seven years. For the first three seasons, Grubb served as the offensive line coach and run game coordinator for the Cougars, while in his last four seasons he was the offensive coordinator and quarterbacks coach. During his time at Sioux Falls, Grubb also served as the school's strength and conditioning coach. In addition to winning two NAIA national championships with the football team, he was also named NAIA National Strength and Conditioning Coach of the Year in 2008.

Sioux Falls promoted Grubb to offensive coordinator for the 2009 season. Following that season, DeBoer departed to become offensive coordinator at Southern Illinois. New head coach Jed Stugart retained Grubb and defensive coordinator Jon Anderson.

=== Eastern Michigan ===
When DeBoer was hired as the offensive coordinator at Eastern Michigan in 2014, Grubb followed, taking the offensive line coach position with the Eagles.

=== Fresno State ===
He stayed in Ypsilanti for three seasons before following DeBoer to Fresno State Bulldogs football upon DeBoer's hiring as the Bulldogs' offensive coordinator in 2017; Grubb was hired to the position of offensive line coach and run game coordinator, and added the titles of offensive coordinator and associate head coach entering 2019.

=== Washington ===
In December 2021 Grubb again followed DeBoer, this time to Washington. In their first season there, Grubb and DeBoer overhauled the Husky offense, leading to outstanding results: leading the nation in passing yards per game, first downs per game and third down percentage, placing second in total offense and seventh in scoring.

On January 14, 2024, Grubb announced on X (formerly known as Twitter) that he would be leaving Washington after not being selected to become the new head coach of the team, following the departure of Kalen DeBoer.

=== Seattle Seahawks ===
On February 13, 2024, Grubb was hired by the Seattle Seahawks as their offensive coordinator under head coach Mike Macdonald. On January 6, 2025, it was announced that Grubb would not return as the team's offensive coordinator.

=== Alabama ===
On February 2, 2025, Grubb was hired to serve as the offensive coordinator for the University of Alabama, once again reuniting him with head coach Kalen DeBoer.

== Personal life ==
Grubb attended Kingsley–Pierson High School, in his hometown of Kingsley, Iowa. He earned a Bachelor of Business Administration from Buena Vista University in 1999, and later earned a Master of Science in sports administration from South Dakota State University in sports pedagogy in 2006.

He and his wife, Stephanie, have a daughter, Falynn.
