= Lawton–Bronson Community School District =

Public school district in Lawton, Iowa, United States

Coordinates: 42.476311°N 96.174584°W

Location
- Lawton, Iowa Woodbury County and Plymouth County United States
- Coordinates: 42.476311, -96.174584

District information
- Type: Local school district
- Grades: PK–12
- Established: 1966
- Superintendent: Chad Shook
- Schools: 2
- Budget: $10,728,000 (2020-21)
- NCES District ID: 1916440

Students and staff
- Students: 745 (2023–24)
- Teachers: 49.19 ((on an FTE basis))
- Staff: 47.83 ((on an FTE basis))
- Student–teacher ratio: 15.15
- Athletic conference: Western Valley
- District mascot: Eagles
- Colors: Black and Yellow

Other information
- Website: www.lb-eagles.org

Lawton–Bronson Community School District is a rural public school district in Iowa which has two schools: Lawton–Bronson Elementary School in Bronson and Lawton–Bronson Jr./Sr. High School in Lawton.

Almost all of the district is in Woodbury County, with a small part in Plymouth County.

The school mascot is the Eagles, and the colors are black and yellow.

== History ==
The district was established on July 1, 1966, by the merger of the Lawton and Bronson districts; the latter was an elementary-only district.

== Lawton–Bronson Junior/Senior High School ==
=== Athletics ===
The Eagles compete in the Western Valley Activities Conference in the following sports:

- Cross country
- Volleyball
- Football
- Basketball
- Wrestling
- Track and field
  - Boys' 1991 Class 1A State Champions
- Golf
- Baseball
- Softball

The Lawton Bronson Athletic Director is Cade Pederson.

== See also ==
- List of school districts in Iowa
- List of high schools in Iowa
