= West Monona Community School District =

Public school district in Onawa, Iowa, United States

Coordinates: 42.022098°N 96.105502°W

Location
- Onawa, Iowa Monona County and Harrison County United States
- Coordinates: 42.022098, -96.105502

District information
- Type: Local school district
- Grades: K-12
- Established: 1962
- Superintendent: Marty Fonley
- Schools: 3
- Budget: $10,647,000 (2020-21)
- NCES District ID: 1931110

Students and staff
- Students: 634 (2022-23)
- Teachers: 46.74 FTE
- Staff: 58.53 FTE
- Student–teacher ratio: 13.56
- Athletic conference: Western Valley Activities Conference
- District mascot: Spartans
- Colors: Green, White, and Black

Other information
- Website: www.westmonona.org

The West Monona Community School District is a rural public school district headquartered in Onawa, Iowa. It operates an elementary school, a middle school, and a high school. The district is mostly in Monona County with a small portion in Harrison County. The district serves Onawa, Blencoe, and Turin.

Previously, the district had two elementary schools, Central Elementary School and Lark Elementary School, and a junior-senior high school.

The school mascot is the Spartans, and the colors are green, white, and black.

== History ==
The district was formed in 1962 with consolidation of the Onawa and Blencoe districts.

On July 1, 2004, East Monona Community School District was dissolved, with a portion going to West Monona, which took about 28% of the district's area.

== Schools ==
The district operates three schools, all located in Onawa:

- West Monona Elementary School
- West Monona Middle School
- West Monona High School

=== West Monona High School ===
==== Athletics ====
The Spartans compete in the Western Valley Activities Conference in the following sports:

- Cross Country
- Volleyball
- Football
- Basketball
- Track and Field
- Golf
  - 2005 Class 1A Boys' Golf State Champions
- Baseball
- Softball
- Dance Team
- Cheerleading

== See also ==
- List of school districts in Iowa
- List of high schools in Iowa
