= Woodbury Central Community School District =

School district in Moville, Iowa, United States

Coordinates: 42.483759°N 96.067727°W

Location
- Moville, Iowa Woodbury County United States
- Coordinates: 42.483759, -96.067727

District information
- Type: Local school district
- Grades: K-12
- Established: 1962
- Superintendent: Thomas Luxford
- Schools: 3
- Budget: $8,995,000 (2020-21)
- NCES District ID: 1931950

Students and staff
- Students: 566 (2022-23)
- Teachers: 47.80 FTE
- Staff: 53.46 FTE
- Student–teacher ratio: 11.84
- Athletic conference: Western Valley
- District mascot: Wildcats
- Colors: Blue and White

Other information
- Website: www.woodbury-central.k12.ia.us

The Woodbury Central Community School District is a rural public school district headquartered in Moville, Iowa. It is completely within Woodbury County, and serves the town of Moville, the unincorporated community of Climbing Hill, and the surrounding rural areas.

The district was created in 1962, from the consolidation of Moville and Climbing Hill.

== Schools ==
The district operates three schools, all in Moville:

- Moville Elementary School
- Woodbury Central Middle School
- Woodbury Central High School

=== Woodbury Central High School ===
==== Athletics ====
The Wildcats compete in the Western Valley Activities Conference in the following sports:

- Cross Country
- Volleyball
- Football
  - 1980 Class 1A State Champions
- Basketball
- Track and Field
- Golf
- Baseball
- Wrestling
- Softball
  - 2002 Class 1A State Champions
