= Blencoe, Iowa =

- City
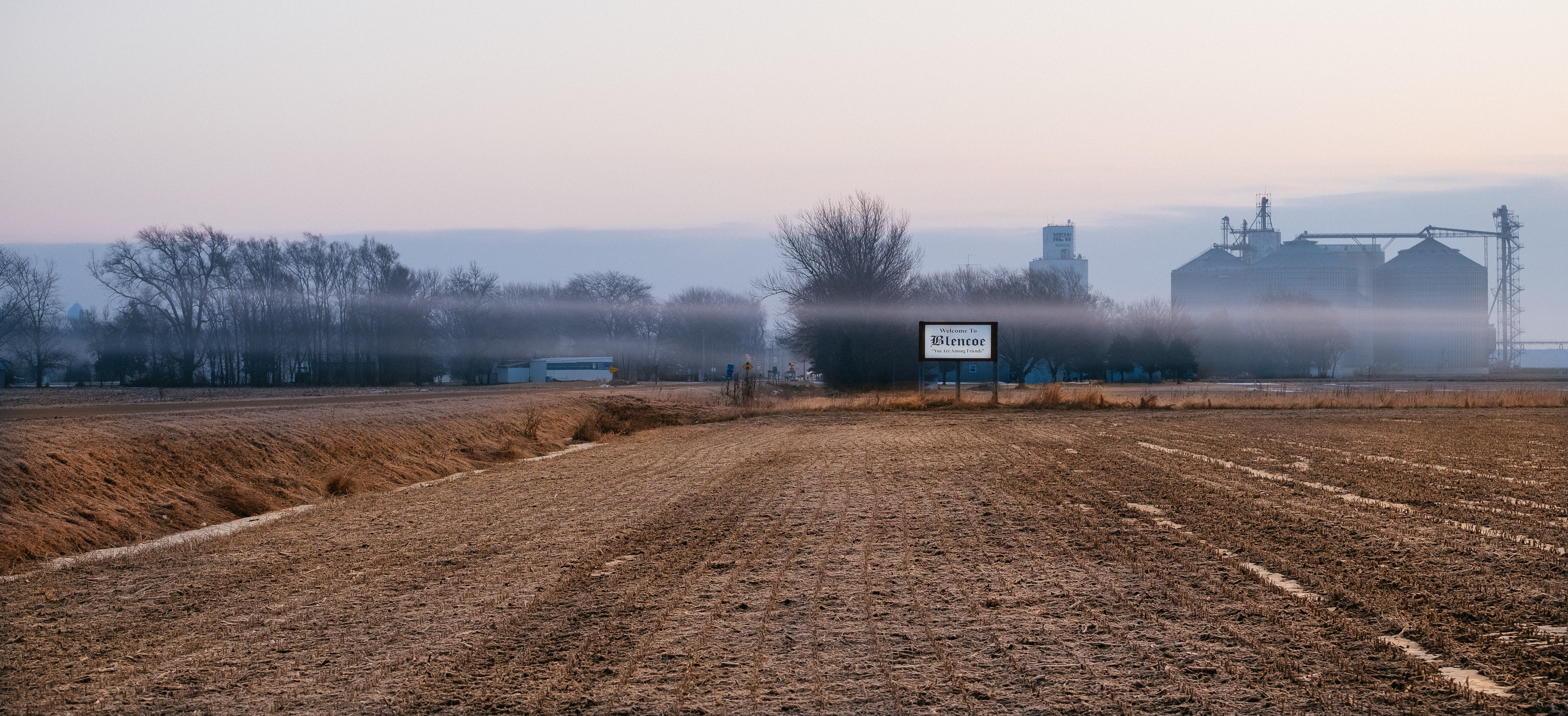
- Blencoe viewed from the west just after sunrise

- Location of Blencoe, Iowa
- Coordinates: 41°55′49″N 96°04′55″W
- Country: USA
- State: Iowa
- County: Monona

Area
  - Total: 0.76 sq mi (1.97 km^{2})
  - Land: 0.76 sq mi (1.97 km^{2})
  - Water: 0 sq mi (0.00 km^{2})
- Elevation: 1,043 ft (318 m)

Population (2020)
  - Total: 233
  - Density: 306.6/sq mi (118.38/km^{2})
- Time zone: UTC-6 (Central (CST))
  - Summer (DST): UTC-5 (CDT)
- ZIP code: 51523
- Area code: 712
- FIPS code: 19-06940
- GNIS feature ID: 2394191

Blencoe is a city in Monona County, Iowa, United States. The population was 233 at the 2020 census.

An early settler from Blencoe, Canada, named the town.

== Geography ==
According to the United States Census Bureau, the city has a total area of 0.76 square miles (1.97 km^{2}), all land.

== Demographics ==
Historical populations
Year	Pop.	±%
1900	279	—
1910	283	+1.4%
1920	317	+12.0%
1930	333	+5.0%
1940	367	+10.2%
1950	328	−10.6%
1960	286	−12.8%
1970	255	−10.8%
1980	247	−3.1%
1990	250	+1.2%
2000	231	−7.6%
2010	224	−3.0%
2020	233	+4.0%
Source:"U.S. Census website". United States Census Bureau. and Iowa Data Center; Source: U.S. Decennial Census

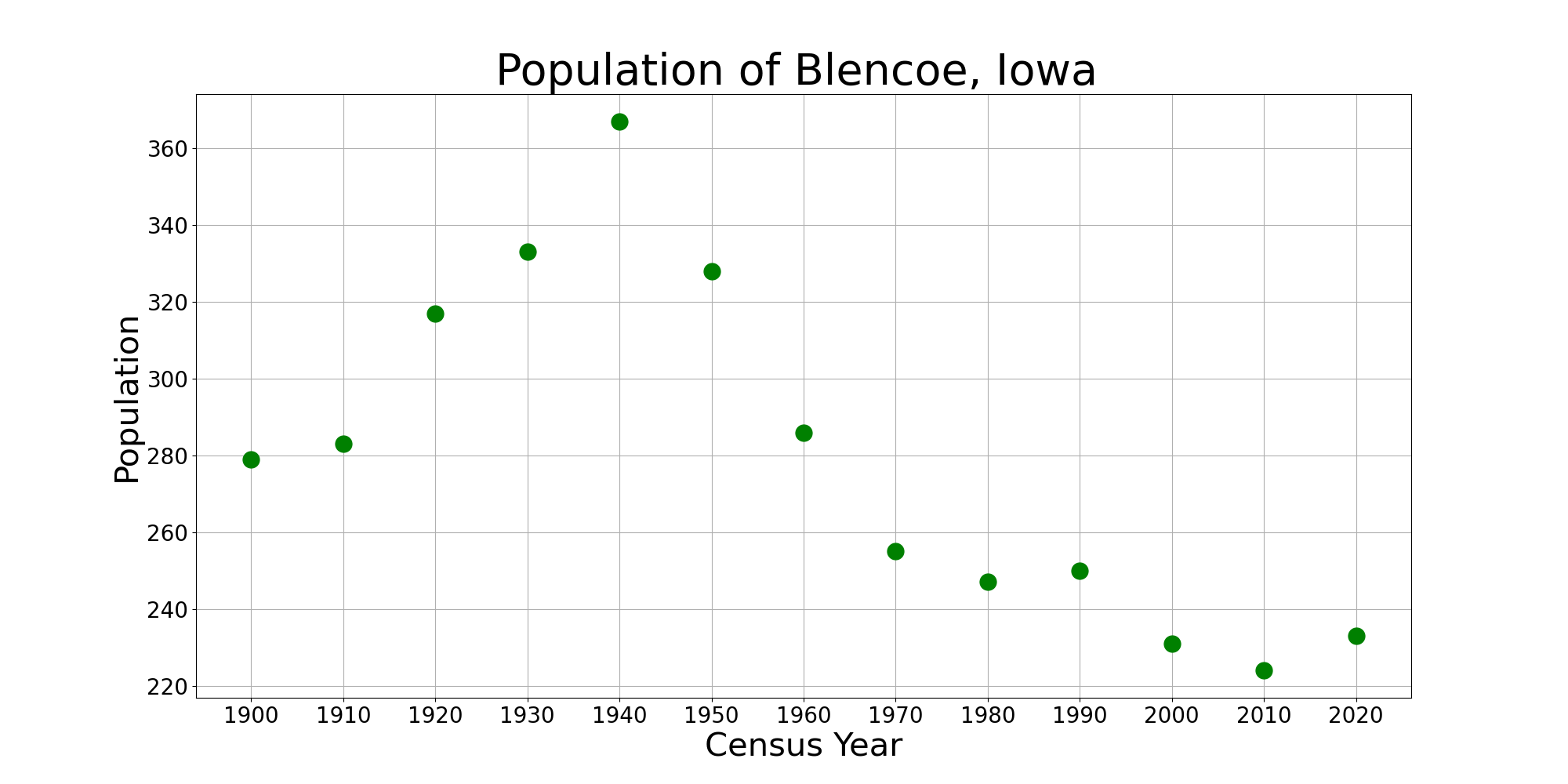
The population of Blencoe, Iowa from US census data

=== 2020 census ===
As of the census of 2020, there were 233 people, 98 households, and 60 families residing in the city. The population density was 306.6 inhabitants per square mile (118.4/km^{2}). There were 112 housing units at an average density of 147.4 per square mile (56.9/km^{2}). The racial makeup of the city was 94.4% White, 0.4% Black or African American, 0.4% Native American, 0.0% Asian, 0.0% Pacific Islander, 0.0% from other races and 4.7% from two or more races. Hispanic or Latino persons of any race comprised 3.0% of the population.

Of the 98 households, 21.4% of which had children under the age of 18 living with them, 45.9% were married couples living together, 12.2% were cohabitating couples, 25.5% had a female householder with no spouse or partner present and 16.3% had a male householder with no spouse or partner present. 38.8% of all households were non-families. 27.6% of all households were made up of individuals, 20.4% had someone living alone who was 65 years old or older.

The median age in the city was 47.3 years. 22.3% of the residents were under the age of 20; 4.7% were between the ages of 20 and 24; 22.3% were from 25 and 44; 21.9% were from 45 and 64; and 28.8% were 65 years of age or older. The gender makeup of the city was 48.9% male and 51.1% female.

=== 2010 census ===
As of the census of 2010, there were 224 people, 99 households, and 70 families living in the city. The population density was 294.7 inhabitants per square mile (113.8/km^{2}). There were 116 housing units at an average density of 152.6 per square mile (58.9/km^{2}). The racial makeup of the city was 96.9% White, 0.4% Native American, 0.4% Asian, and 2.2% from two or more races. Hispanic or Latino of any race were 0.4% of the population.

There were 99 households, of which 23.2% had children under the age of 18 living with them, 48.5% were married couples living together, 16.2% had a female householder with no husband present, 6.1% had a male householder with no wife present, and 29.3% were non-families. 25.3% of all households were made up of individuals, and 8.1% had someone living alone who was 65 years of age or older. The average household size was 2.26 and the average family size was 2.63.

The median age in the city was 49.7 years. 18.7% of residents were under the age of 18; 7.7% were between the ages of 18 and 24; 19.3% were from 25 to 44; 30.8% were from 45 to 64; and 23.7% were 65 years of age or older. The gender makeup of the city was 46.4% male and 53.6% female.

=== 2000 census ===
As of the census of 2000, there were 231 people, 110 households, and 68 families living in the city. The population density was 309.3 inhabitants per square mile (119.4/km^{2}). There were 117 housing units at an average density of 156.7 per square mile (60.5/km^{2}). The racial makeup of the city was 99.13% White, and 0.87% from two or more races.

There were 110 households, out of which 21.8% had children under the age of 18 living with them, 53.6% were married couples living together, 6.4% had a female householder with no husband present, and 37.3% were non-families. 35.5% of all households were made up of individuals, and 24.5% had someone living alone who was 65 years of age or older. The average household size was 2.10 and the average family size was 2.71.

In the city, the population was spread out, with 19.9% under the age of 18, 4.3% from 18 to 24, 16.0% from 25 to 44, 25.5% from 45 to 64, and 34.2% who were 65 years of age or older. The median age was 50 years. For every 100 females, there were 86.3 males. For every 100 females age 18 and over, there were 85.0 males.

The median income for a household in the city was $25,556, and the median income for a family was $40,833. Males had a median income of $35,250 versus $18,438 for females. The per capita income for the city was $13,841. About 4.7% of families and 7.6% of the population were below the poverty line, including 12.9% of those under the age of eighteen and 2.5% of those 65 or over.

== Education ==
West Monona Community School District operates public schools serving the community.
