= Roy S. Armstrong =

American politician

Member of the South Dakota House of Representatives
- In office 1953–1964

Personal details
- Born: December 12, 1900 Moville, Iowa, U.S.
- Died: May 7, 1987 (aged 86) Moody County, South Dakota, U.S.
- Party: Republican

Roy S. Armstrong (December 12, 1900 – May 7, 1987) was an American politician. He served as a Republican member of the South Dakota House of Representatives.

== Life and career ==
Armstrong was born in Moville, Iowa. He served in the United States Navy during World War II.

Armstrong served in the South Dakota House of Representatives from 1953 to 1964.

Armstrong died on May 7, 1987 in Moody County, South Dakota, at the age of 86.
