= Boyer Valley Conference =

Former Iowa High School athletic conference

The Boyer Valley Conference was a high school athletic conference in west central Iowa. It merged with the Maple Valley Conference for the 2008 season to form the Western Valley Activities Conference.

== Former members ==
School	Location	Mascot	Colors
Ar-We-VA	Westside	Rockets	
Boyer Valley	Dunlap	Bulldogs	
Charter Oak-Ute	Charter Oak	Bobcats	
Dow City-Arion	Dow City	Greyhounds	
Dunlap	Dunlap	Bulldogs	
East Monona	Moorhead	T-Hawks	
Irwin-Kirkman-Manilla	Manilla	Hawks	
Logan-Magnolia	Logan	Panthers	
Manning	Manning	Bulldogs	
Schleswig	Schleswig	Hawks	
West Harrison	Mondamin	Hawkeyes	
Woodbine	Woodbine	Tigers	

== History ==
The Boyer Valley Conference had been formed around 1960 and had many schools consolidate over the years. For much of its history, the Boyer Valley Conference consisted of members in West Harrison in Mondamin, Woodbine, Dunlap, Schleswig, Charter Oak, Dow City, Irwin, Logan, Ar-We-Va in Westside, and East Monona in Moorhead. In 1977, Manilla won the 1A State Football Championship. In the early 1980s, Manilla joined the league, followed by Manning a few years later. This put the league at 12 schools in the late 1980s. Schleswig won the Class A State Football Championship in 1984 and 1988.

By 1990, Dunlap was sharing sports with Dow City-Arion and Irwin-Kirkman was sharing with Manilla. Before long, these schools officially consolidated. They became known as Boyer Valley and IKM, respectively. In 1990, Logan-Magnolia won the Class A State Football Championship. More change was on the horizon for the league, though. Schleswig left the conference in 1993 to consolidate with Denison, who went on to join the Hawkeye Ten Conference. Then, East Monona closed its high school and the district was eventually dissolved by the state in 1998. In 2002, Manning won the Class A State Football Championship and in 2006 IKM won it. The League's seminal moment may have come in 2005 when Charter Oak-Ute defeated IKM for the 1A Girls Basketball Championship in Des Moines.

The league continued to operate until its final year of 2007 when the conference was left with only eight schools: Ar-We-Va, Boyer Valley, Charter Oak-Ute, IKM, Logan-Magnolia, Manning, West Harrison, and Woodbine. With IKM and Manning set to enter a sport-sharing agreement for the 2008–09 school year, it looked like the right time for many of its members to find a new home. The league consolidated with the Maple Valley Conference to form the Western Valley Activities Conference.

== Legacy ==
The Western Valley Activities Conference proved to be a poor fit for many member schools. In 2013, just five years after it began competition, all of the former Boyer Valley Conference members left the league for other conferences. The former Boyer Valley members now live on in one of two conferences. IKM-Manning and Logan-Magnolia now compete in the 10-team Western Iowa Conference. Ar-We-Va, Boyer Valley, Charter Oak-Ute, West Harrison, and Woodbine are founding members of the Rolling Valley Conference, which began play in 2013–14.
