= Pierson, Iowa =

- City
- Location of Pierson, Iowa
- Coordinates: 42°32′37″N 95°52′00″W
- Country: USA
- State: Iowa
- County: Woodbury

Area
  - Total: 0.47 sq mi (1.23 km^{2})
  - Land: 0.47 sq mi (1.23 km^{2})
  - Water: 0 sq mi (0.00 km^{2})
- Elevation: 1,276 ft (389 m)

Population (2020)
  - Total: 337
  - Density: 709.5/sq mi (273.94/km^{2})
- Time zone: UTC-6 (Central (CST))
  - Summer (DST): UTC-5 (CDT)
- ZIP code: 51048
- Area code: 712
- FIPS code: 19-62760
- GNIS feature ID: 2396201
- Website: www.piersonia.com

Pierson is a city in Woodbury County, Iowa, United States. It is part of the Sioux City, Iowa–Nebraska–South Dakota Metropolitan Statistical Area. The population was 337 at the time of the 2020 census. Pierson was platted in 1883 with railroads and lumberyards being important to its growth. The city started with only eight blocks of land until new additions were later made. Pierson has a library, a school district, and five churches, among other businesses and recreation.

== History ==
Pierson was platted in 1883 and the original owners were the Railroad Land Co. The city might have been named for Moses Pearson a pioneer settler. Pierson originally only had eight blocks of land and new additions began being added in July 1892. Railroads were important to the growth of northwest Iowa, which includes Pierson, due to it carrying lumber and other material for expansion. Lumberyards were a major business in the early days of Pierson with the earliest such company being founded in 1883 as the Joyce Lumber Company. The newspaper Pierson Press was published from 1882, a year before being platted, until 1957. John C. Pierson was the mayor from 1898 to 1905.

Henry Castle from Correctionville, Iowa, founded a store in Pierson that sold groceries and hardware and acted as a post office. In 1885, the store was purchased by Mills and Robinson from Sioux City, Iowa, until 1890, when J. C. Mills purchased it, and he operated it until he died in 1903. The store went through multiple ownership changes until July 2016, when the final tenants left, leaving behind an empty building.

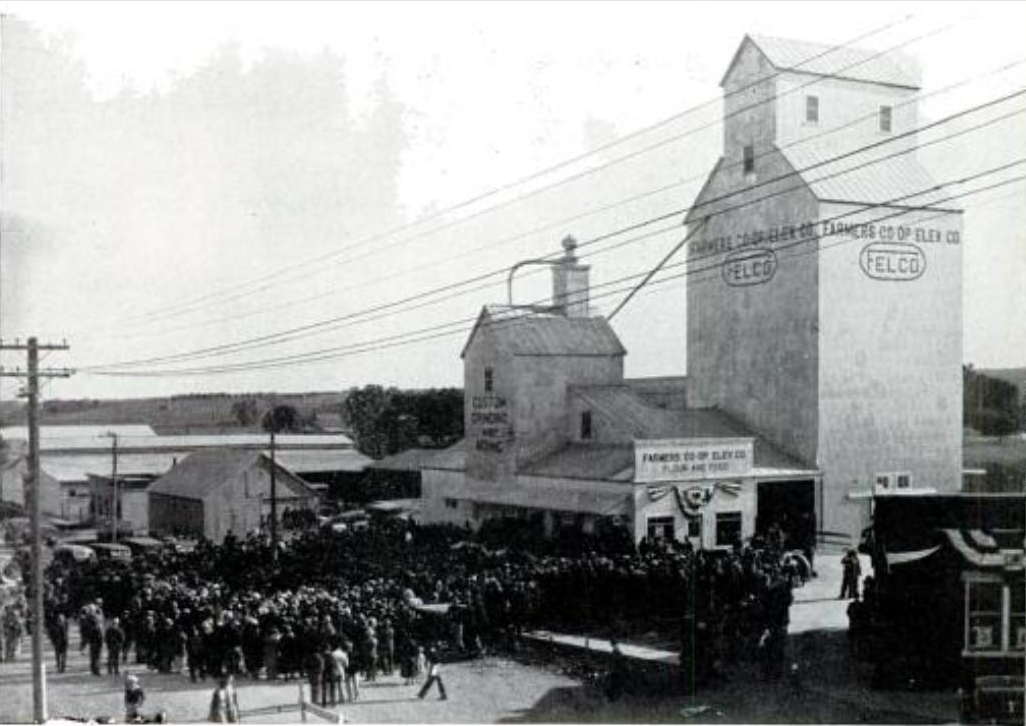
The Farmer's Elevator Co. in 1939

The Farmers' Elevator Co. was founded in 1904 and it had grain from five counties within northwestern Iowa. The co-op elevator sold corn, oats, and barley with 3,500 bushes processed an hour by a lift. An addition was made to the company in 1915 and the facility was rebuilt in 1936. Herman and Henry Rock operated a franchise of John Deere from the late 1920s until the mid-1930s. The business was started again in 1936 as the Rock-Karsten Implement Company. After being in operation by multiple owners over the years, the business ended in 1986.

In 2000, Pierson's business district received new streets and new sidewalks. A celebration was held on the streets with churches having services, a live band playing, food being served, and children decorating the streets with chalk. The 4 Angels Memorial was made to remember four Kingsley–Pierson girls who died after a snowmobile accident in December 2003. The girls were ages 10 to 13 years old. In 2018, its World War I memorial was rededicated as part of a Pritzker Military Museum & Library program "to commemorate 100 memorials during the 100th anniversary of the end of World War I". American Legion Post 291 and local citizens obtained help from the Pritzker Museum to receive a $15,000 grant to upgrade the monument.

== Geography ==
Pierson is located "in the north-eastern part of Woodbury County, in the Northwest part of Iowa." According to the United States Census Bureau, the city has a total area of 0.62 square miles (1.61 km^{2}), all land. The nearest highway is U.S. Route 20. Pierson's surroundings is a rural area.

== Demographics ==
Historical populations
Year	Pop.	±%
1900	358	—
1910	416	+16.2%
1920	554	+33.2%
1930	551	−0.5%
1940	531	−3.6%
1950	453	−14.7%
1960	425	−6.2%
1970	421	−0.9%
1980	408	−3.1%
1990	341	−16.4%
2000	371	+8.8%
2010	366	−1.3%
2020	337	−7.9%
Source:"U.S. Census website". United States Census Bureau. and Iowa Data Center; Source: U.S. Decennial Census

=== 2020 census ===
As of the census of 2020, there were 337 people, 131 households, and 90 families residing in the city. The population density was 709.5 inhabitants per square mile (273.9/km^{2}). There were 152 housing units at an average density of 320.0 per square mile (123.6/km^{2}). The racial makeup of the city was 95.5% White, 0.0% Black or African American, 0.9% Native American, 0.0% Asian, 0.0% Pacific Islander, 0.6% from other races and 3.0% from two or more races. Hispanic or Latino persons of any race comprised 2.7% of the population.

Of the 131 households, 36.6% of which had children under the age of 18 living with them, 45.0% were married couples living together, 6.9% were cohabitating couples, 26.0% had a female householder with no spouse or partner present and 22.1% had a male householder with no spouse or partner present. 31.3% of all households were non-families. 26.0% of all households were made up of individuals, 12.2% had someone living alone who was 65 years old or older.

The median age in the city was 32.3 years. 35.0% of the residents were under the age of 20; 2.4% were between the ages of 20 and 24; 31.2% were from 25 and 44; 16.6% were from 45 and 64; and 14.8% were 65 years of age or older. The gender makeup of the city was 46.3% male and 53.7% female.

=== 2010 census ===
As of the census of 2010, there were 366 people, 147 households, and 102 families living in the city. The population density was 590.3 inhabitants per square mile (227.9/km^{2}). There were 170 housing units at an average density of 274.2 per square mile (105.9/km^{2}). The racial makeup of the city was 94.5% White, 0.8% African American, 1.9% Native American, 0.5% Asian, 0.3% from other races, and 1.9% from two or more races. Hispanic or Latino of any race were 1.1% of the population.

There were 147 households, of which 35.4% had children under the age of 18 living with them, 51.7% were married couples living together, 11.6% had a female householder with no husband present, 6.1% had a male householder with no wife present, and 30.6% were non-families. 23.8% of all households were made up of individuals, and 12.9% had someone living alone who was 65 years of age or older. The average household size was 2.49, and the average family size was 2.97.

The median age in the city was 36.7 years. 30.1% of residents were under 18; 6.3% were between 18 and 24; 21.9% were from 25 to 44; 23.8% were from 45 to 64, and 18% were 65 years of age or older. The gender makeup of the city was 51.1% male and 48.9% female.

=== 2000 census ===
As of the census of 2000, there were 371 people, 148 households, and 105 families living in the city. The population density was 757.3 inhabitants per square mile (292.4/km^{2}). There were 166 housing units at an average density of 338.9 per square mile (130.9/km^{2}). The racial makeup of the city was 98.38% White, 0.27% Asian, 0.27% from other races, and 1.08% from two or more races. Hispanic or Latino of any race were 0.54% of the population.]

There were 148 households, out of which 31.8% had children under the age of 18 living with them, 58.8% were married couples living together, 6.1% had a female householder with no husband present, and 28.4% were non-families. 25.7% of all households were made up of individuals, and 14.2% had someone living alone who was 65 years of age or older. The average household size was 2.51, and the average family size was 2.95.

Age spread: 27.5% under the age of 18, 6.2% from 18 to 24, 25.6% from 25 to 44, 18.9% from 45 to 64, and 21.8% who were 65 years of age or older. The median age was 38 years. For every 100 females, there were 100.5 males. For every 100 females age 18 and over, there were 97.8 males.

The median income for a household in the city was $35,278, and the median income for a family was $40,833. Males had a median income of $30,083 versus $25,556 for females. The per capita income for the city was $15,945. About 4.8% of families and 6.3% of the population were below the poverty line, including 6.5% of those under age 18 and 4.9% of those age 65 or over.

== Education and community ==
The Kingsley–Pierson Community School District operates local area public schools. Elementary school students attend school either in Kingsley, Iowa, or Pierson. Students attend middle school in Pierson and high school in Kingsley.

The Old School Bell Memorial is in front of the middle school, and it has a bell taken from the 1893 school and bricks taken from the 1915 school. The Veterans War Memorial was made in 1921 to honor World War I veterans and another memorial was built in 2004 to honor veterans who served in later wars.

The Pierson Public Library had its beginnings in 1902 when 26 members formed a "Literary and Reading Club." Their reading room was in a store's basement until the group lost interest. A library association was started in December 1912, and the library was located inside the town hall. The Iowa State Traveling Library gave books to the library during that time. In February 1935, a library was started by The Pierson Federated Women's Club. In 1951, a county library was organized, and the women's club gave their Pierson library to Woodbury County. The library moved a few more times until its current location on Main Street within the city hall.

Pierson has an ambulance. Organizations within Pierson are the Pierson Library Friends, 4-H, Rutland Masonic Lodge, Federated Women's Club, Legion, Legion Auxiliary, Junior Girls Auxiliary, and the Golf Club Association.

Pierson's three churches are the United Methodist Church, Salem Lutheran Church, and Pierson Christian Church. Pierson's only cemetery is Greenwood Cemetery. It was founded in 1904, although a few burials happened in the area in 1903. It is located a mile away from Pierson on D31 or Minnesota Avenue.

== Recreation ==
Pierson's city park contains an area that has plants and flowers that are native to the area. It was formed through Pierson's Source Water Protection Plan. The city park has a shelter house built out of rocks in 1941, an outside shelter, a baseball diamond, a sand volleyball court, and a golf course. Jenni Battern Memorial Park has a basketball court and a playground.

In August 2021, the arts and music festival Golphstok 2021 was held in Pierson. The festival was started in the summer of 2017 as a way for the founder to play music with his two sons. The first GolfStock was organized as a way to raise funds for Pierson's golf course, but the potential was realized for GolphStok to really grow into an annual tradition for Pierson. Golphstock was originally named Golfstock as a play on words of Woodstock, but the name changed when it was not for a golf course fundraiser.
