= Bronson, Iowa =

- City
- Location of Bronson, Iowa
- Coordinates: 42°24′32″N 96°12′38″W
- Country: USA
- State: Iowa
- County: Woodbury

Area
  - Total: 0.35 sq mi (0.90 km^{2})
  - Land: 0.35 sq mi (0.90 km^{2})
  - Water: 0 sq mi (0.00 km^{2})
- Elevation: 1,106 ft (337 m)

Population (2020)
  - Total: 294
  - Density: 848.8/sq mi (327.72/km^{2})
- Time zone: UTC-6 (Central (CST))
  - Summer (DST): UTC-5 (CDT)
- ZIP code: 51007
- Area code: 712
- FIPS code: 19-08650
- GNIS feature ID: 2393423
- Website: www.cityofbronson.com

Bronson is a city in Woodbury County, Iowa, United States. It is part of the Sioux City metropolitan area. The population was 294 at the 2020 census.

== History ==
Bronson was laid out in 1901. It was named for Ira D. Bronson, an early settler.

It celebrated its centennial in 2003. A publication was produced with some town history.

== Geography ==
According to the United States Census Bureau, the city has a total area of 0.31 square miles (0.80 km^{2}), all land.

Bronson is located within the Loess Hills landform.

== Demographics ==
Historical populations
Year	Pop.	±%
1970	193	—
1980	289	+49.7%
1990	209	−27.7%
2000	269	+28.7%
2010	322	+19.7%
2020	294	−8.7%
Source:"U.S. Census website". United States Census Bureau. and Iowa Data Center; Source: U.S. Decennial Census

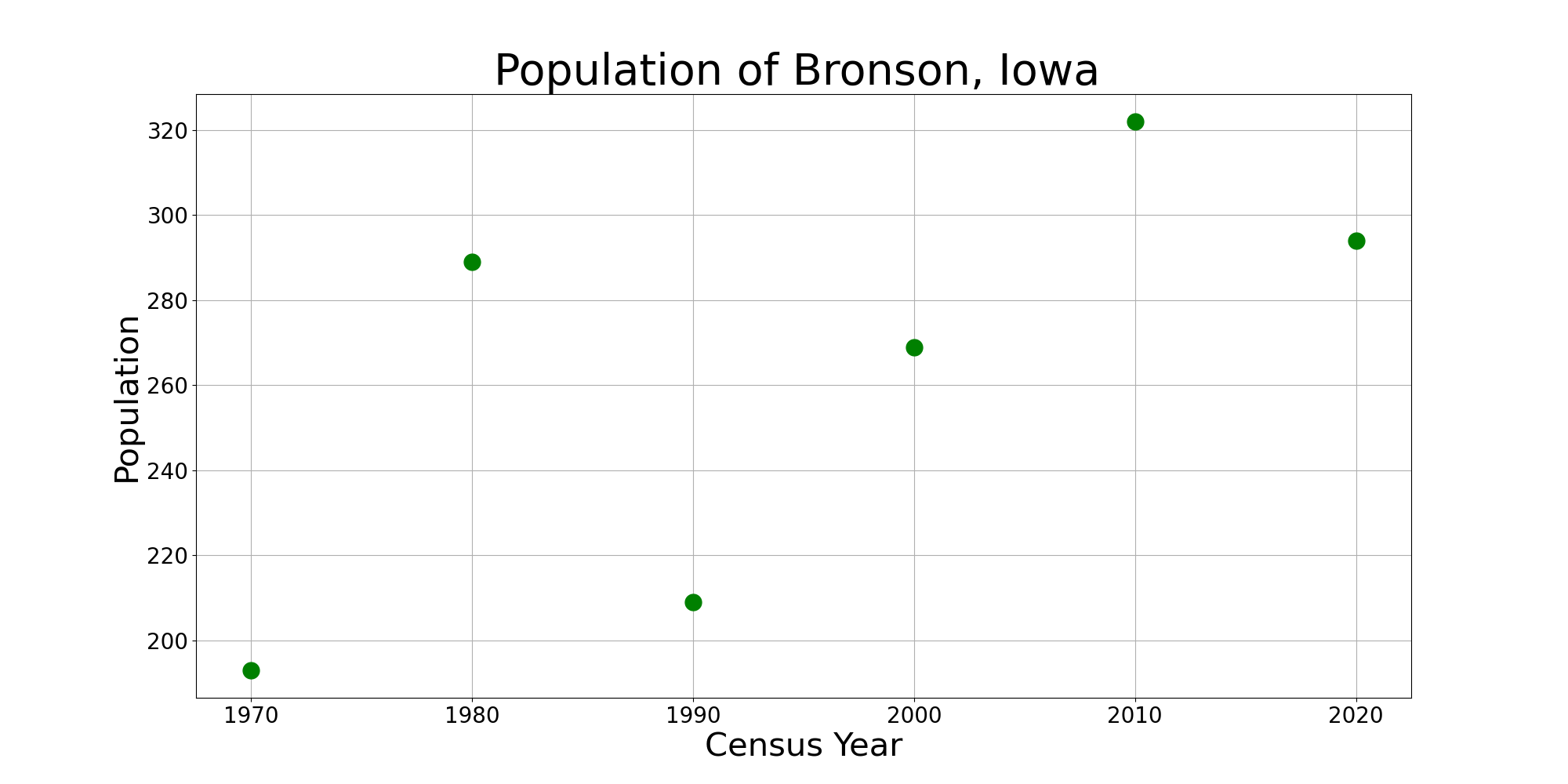
The population of Bronson, Iowa from US census data

=== 2020 census ===
As of the census of 2020, there were 294 people, 106 households, and 75 families residing in the city. The population density was 848.8 inhabitants per square mile (327.7/km^{2}). There were 111 housing units at an average density of 320.5 per square mile (123.7/km^{2}). The racial makeup of the city was 90.8% White, 1.0% Black or African American, 0.3% Native American, 0.0% Asian, 0.0% Pacific Islander, 0.0% from other races and 7.8% from two or more races. Hispanic or Latino persons of any race comprised 3.7% of the population.

Of the 106 households, 45.3% of which had children under the age of 18 living with them, 59.4% were married couples living together, 9.4% were cohabitating couples, 17.9% had a female householder with no spouse or partner present and 13.2% had a male householder with no spouse or partner present. 29.2% of all households were non-families. 23.6% of all households were made up of individuals, 4.7% had someone living alone who was 65 years old or older.

The median age in the city was 36.0 years. 30.6% of the residents were under the age of 20; 7.1% were between the ages of 20 and 24; 24.8% were from 25 and 44; 26.5% were from 45 and 64; and 10.9% were 65 years of age or older. The gender makeup of the city was 53.1% male and 46.9% female.

=== 2010 census ===
As of the census of 2010, there were 322 people, 113 households, and 82 families living in the city. The population density was 1,038.7 inhabitants per square mile (401.0/km^{2}). There were 117 housing units at an average density of 377.4 per square mile (145.7/km^{2}). The racial makeup of the city was 97.8% White, 0.6% Native American, and 1.6% from two or more races. Hispanic or Latino of any race were 1.2% of the population.

There were 113 households, of which 42.5% had children under the age of 18 living with them, 59.3% were married couples living together, 7.1% had a female householder with no husband present, 6.2% had a male householder with no wife present, and 27.4% were non-families. 21.2% of all households were made up of individuals, and 6.2% had someone living alone who was 65 years of age or older. The average household size was 2.85 and the average family size was 3.40.

The median age in the city was 33 years. 32.9% of residents were under the age of 18; 6.9% were between the ages of 18 and 24; 27% were from 25 to 44; 23.6% were from 45 to 64; and 9.6% were 65 years of age or older. The gender makeup of the city was 50.3% male and 49.7% female.

=== 2000 census ===
As of the census of 2000, there were 269 people, 100 households, and 74 families living in the city. The population density was 825.0 inhabitants per square mile (318.5/km^{2}). There were 103 housing units at an average density of 315.9 per square mile (122.0/km^{2}). The racial makeup of the city was 98.88% White, 0.37% Asian, and 0.74% from two or more races.

There were 100 households, out of which 42.0% had children under the age of 18 living with them, 59.0% were married couples living together, 10.0% had a female householder with no husband present, and 26.0% were non-families. 19.0% of all households were made up of individuals, and 8.0% had someone living alone who was 65 years of age or older. The average household size was 2.69 and the average family size was 3.08.

In the city, the population was spread out, with 30.9% under the age of 18, 6.3% from 18 to 24, 36.8% from 25 to 44, 18.6% from 45 to 64, and 7.4% who were 65 years of age or older. The median age was 33 years. For every 100 females, there were 108.5 males. For every 100 females age 18 and over, there were 102.2 males.

The median income for a household in the city was $52,727, and the median income for a family was $53,409. Males had a median income of $32,386 versus $22,031 for females. The per capita income for the city was $19,086. None of the families and 0.4% of the population were living below the poverty line.

== Education ==
Lawton–Bronson Community School District operates public schools. The district was established on July 1, 1966, by the merger of the Lawton and Bronson districts; the latter was an elementary-only district.
