= Kingsley–Pierson Community School District =

Public school district in Kingsley, Iowa, United States

Coordinates: 42.58738°N 95.978472°W

Location
- Kingsley, Iowa Woodbury, Plymouth, and Cherokee counties United States
- Coordinates: 42.58738, -95.978472

District information
- Type: Local school district
- Grades: K–12
- Established: 1961
- Superintendent: Scott Bailey
- Schools: 3
- Budget: $7,105,000 (2020-21)
- NCES District ID: 1915750

Students and staff
- Students: 453 (2022-23)
- Teachers: 33.15 FTE
- Staff: 35.31 FTE
- Student–teacher ratio: 13.67
- Athletic conference: Western Valley Activities Conference
- District mascot: Panthers
- Colors: Black and Gold

Other information
- Website: www.k-pcsd.org

The Kingsley–Pierson Community School District is a rural public school district headquartered in Kingsley, Iowa.

It includes sections of Plymouth, Cherokee, and Woodbury counties. It serves Kingsley, Pierson, and the surrounding rural areas.

== History ==
It was established in 1961, by the consolidation of the Kingsley and Pierson districts.

In 2026, the district leadership considered changing the school schedule to four days per week.

== Schools ==
The district operates three schools:

- Kingsley-Pierson Elementary School, Kingsley
- Kingsley-Pierson Middle School, Pierson
- Kingsley–Pierson High School, Kingsley

=== Kingsley–Pierson High School ===
==== Athletics ====
The Panthers compete in the Western Valley Activities Conference in the following sports:

- Cross country
- Volleyball
- Football
- Basketball
- Wrestling
- Track and field
  - Boys' 2-time state champions (1978, 2017)
- Golf
  - Boys' 1987 class 1A state champions
- Baseball
- Softball
  - 3-time state champions (1966, (summer), 1966 (fall), 1967 (fall))

== See also ==
- List of school districts in Iowa
- List of high schools in Iowa
