= Moville, Iowa =

- City
- Location of Moville, Iowa
- Coordinates: 42°29′44″N 96°04′04″W
- Country: USA
- State: Iowa
- County: Woodbury
- Incorporated: August 13, 1889

Area
  - Total: 0.92 sq mi (2.38 km^{2})
  - Land: 0.92 sq mi (2.38 km^{2})
  - Water: 0 sq mi (0.00 km^{2})
- Elevation: 1,181 ft (360 m)

Population (2020)
  - Total: 1,687
  - Density: 1,836.7/sq mi (709.17/km^{2})
- Time zone: UTC-6 (Central (CST))
  - Summer (DST): UTC-5 (CDT)
- ZIP code: 51039
- Area code: 712
- FIPS code: 19-54930
- GNIS feature ID: 2395136
- Website: www.visitmoville.com

Moville is a city in Woodbury County, Iowa, United States. It is part of the Sioux City, IA–NE–SD Metropolitan Statistical Area. The population was 1,687 in the 2020 census, an increase from 1,583 in 2000.

== History ==
John B McDermott is credited with naming the town of Moville after his birthplace in Moville, Ireland (County Donegal). In 1868, he and other men from the area established a post office at the McDermott home. Because McDermott and his wife Martha housed the post office, they chose to name their new town "Moville." Only two Movilles exist in the world. It is pronounced "MOH-vil."

On April 23, 1887, the West Town Lot Company filed at the Woodbury County Courthouse a platted map to be known as the town of Moville, Iowa. Moville citizens approved incorporation of the town in a special election held Aug. 10, 1889. The Articles of Incorporation were filed and approved on Aug. 13, 1889 by the clerk of district court, Woodbury County. Townspeople celebrated its centennial June 19–21, 1987 and celebrated its quasquicentennial (125 years) in 2012.

== Geography ==
According to the United States Census Bureau, the city has a total area of 0.89 square miles (2.31 km^{2}), all land.

Moville is located just north of U.S. Route 20, approximately 15 miles (24 km) east of Sioux City.

== Demographics ==
Historical population
Census	Pop.	Note	%±
1890	296		—
1900	507		71.3%
1910	552		8.9%
1920	878		59.1%
1930	911		3.8%
1940	973		6.8%
1950	964		−0.9%
1960	1,156		19.9%
1970	1,198		3.6%
1980	1,273		6.3%
1990	1,306		2.6%
2000	1,583		21.2%
2010	1,618		2.2%
2020	1,687		4.3%
U.S. Decennial Census

For comparison, in 1895, shortly after the town officially incorporated, there were 95 dwellings, 92 families, 2 foreigners, 15 births (1894), 4 deaths (1894), 1 blind, 201 males, 198 females, 168 married, 231 single, 12 widowed and 3 divorced.

=== 2020 census ===
As of the 2020 census, there were 1,687 people, 664 households, and 475 families residing in the city. The population density was 1,836.7 inhabitants per square mile (709.2/km^{2}). There were 712 housing units at an average density of 775.2 per square mile (299.3/km^{2}).

Of the 664 households, 35.1% had children under the age of 18 living with them, 56.5% were married-couple households, 7.1% were cohabiting-couple households, 20.0% had a female householder with no spouse or partner present, and 16.4% had a male householder with no spouse or partner present. About 28.5% of households were non-families, 24.6% were made up of individuals, and 11.0% had someone living alone who was 65 years of age or older.

The median age was 36.1 years. 26.9% of residents were under the age of 18, 29.3% were under the age of 20, 6.0% were from 20 to 24, 25.7% were from 25 to 44, 22.7% were from 45 to 64, and 16.3% were 65 years of age or older. The gender makeup of the city was 50.3% male and 49.7% female. For every 100 females, there were 101.1 males, and for every 100 females age 18 and over, there were 101.6 males age 18 and over.

0.0% of residents lived in urban areas, while 100.0% lived in rural areas. Of the housing units, 6.7% were vacant. The homeowner vacancy rate was 0.8% and the rental vacancy rate was 9.1%.

Racial composition as of the 2020 census
Race	Number	Percent
White	1,569	93.0%
Black or African American	10	0.6%
American Indian and Alaska Native	2	0.1%
Asian	5	0.3%
Native Hawaiian and Other Pacific Islander	0	0.0%
Some other race	17	1.0%
Two or more races	84	5.0%
Hispanic or Latino (of any race)	60	3.6%

=== 2010 census ===
As of the census of 2010, there were 1,618 people, 643 households, and 460 families residing in the city. The population density was 1,818.0 inhabitants per square mile (701.9/km^{2}). There were 669 housing units at an average density of 751.7 per square mile (290.2/km^{2}). The racial makeup of the city was 96.7% White, 0.4% African American, 0.6% Native American, 0.4% Asian, 0.4% from other races, and 1.6% from two or more races. Hispanic or Latino of any race were 1.9% of the population.

There were 643 households, of which 35.8% had children under the age of 18 living with them, 58.8% were married couples living together, 8.7% had a female householder with no husband present, 4.0% had a male householder with no wife present, and 28.5% were non-families. 24.7% of all households were made up of individuals, and 13% had someone living alone who was 65 years of age or older. The average household size was 2.52 and the average family size was 3.00.

The median age in the city was 38.7 years. 28.2% of residents were under the age of 18; 7.2% were between the ages of 18 and 24; 22.9% were from 25 to 44; 25.8% were from 45 to 64; and 15.9% were 65 years of age or older. The gender makeup of the city was 49.2% male and 50.8% female.

=== 2000 census ===
As of the census of 2000, there were 1,583 people, 618 households, and 446 families residing in the city. The population density was 1,785.1 inhabitants per square mile (689.2/km^{2}). There were 648 housing units at an average density of 730.7 per square mile (282.1/km^{2}). The racial makeup of the city was 98.74% White, 0.25% African American, 0.19% Native American, 0.13% Asian, 0.19% Pacific Islander, 0.25% from other races, and 0.25% from two or more races. Hispanic or Latino of any race were 0.88% of the population.

There were 618 households, out of which 36.2% had children under the age of 18 living with them, 62.1% were married couples living together, 8.1% had a female householder with no husband present, and 27.8% were non-families. 25.7% of all households were made up of individuals, and 15.5% had someone living alone who was 65 years of age or older. The average household size was 2.55 and the average family size was 3.07.

29.4% are under the age of 18, 6.9% from 18 to 24, 27.8% from 25 to 44, 18.0% from 45 to 64, and 17.9% who were 65 years of age or older. The median age was 36 years. For every 100 females, there were 94.5 males. For every 100 females age 18 and over, there were 87.9 males.

The median income for a household in the city was $42,222, and the median income for a family was $53,750. Males had a median income of $35,288 versus $22,500 for females. The per capita income for the city was $19,578. About 5.0% of families and 7.1% of the population were below the poverty line, including 9.4% of those under age 18 and 8.1% of those age 65 or over.

== Economy ==
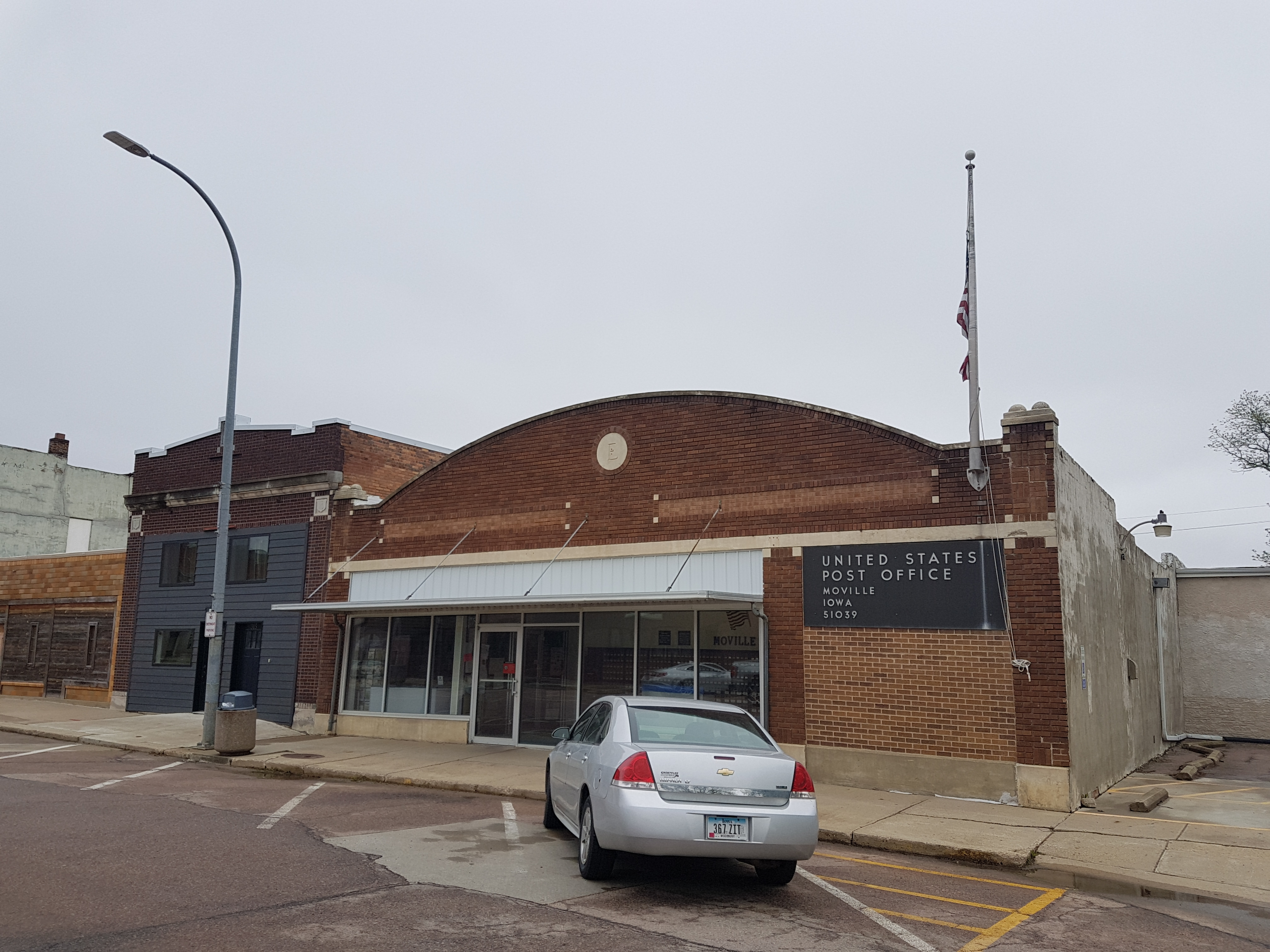
Post office in Moville, Iowa

- Woodbury County REC (Rural Electric Cooperative) was incorporated as a private corporation under the laws of the State of Iowa on July 19, 1938. In 1956, power became available on a wholesale basis from the Bureau of Reclamation (and generated at the dams on the Missouri River in South Dakota). The REC receives its power from five substations, and by 1987, it had approximately 1,054 miles (1,696 km) of line in operation, serving 2,598 locations. The cooperative is strictly nonprofit and all revenue above the cost of delivering power to members is pro-rated back to these members on the basis of their business done with the cooperative.
- Meadows Country Club Public Course is a medium-length regulation 9-hole golf course and driving range. It includes three sets of tee boxes for an enjoyable but challenging (somewhat hilly) golf experience on about 70 acres (280,000 m^{2}). Designed by Martin Johnson, the bluegrass course was built in 1967–68 on land donated by Charlie and Helen Logan of Moville; its clubhouse is a former two-story barn (60 ft X 100 ft) built in 1917 for the purpose of breeding, raising and showing draft horses raised by Helen Logan's father: W.W. McElrath. Back tees: Par 36, 3,388 yards, USGA course/slope ratings: 71.8/115. It was named Iowa's "9-Hole Course of the Year" in 2014.
- Moville Elderly Housing
- MCDAI (Moville Community Development Action Inc.) was incorporated in July 1961 for the town's Jubilee in 1962. An annual meeting is held each October 1. Its purpose is to raise monies to create, update and add to community projects to benefit its citizens. MCDAI has been instrumental in bringing a doctor into town, adding to its volunteer ambulance and fire departments, and promoting housing.
- Senior Center of Moville

== Parks and recreation ==
Moville is home to three parks within city limits and one just north of town.

- Moville City Park- 400 Main Street (built in 1916). The park includes a Pavilion that seats 200 and full kitchen, newly renovated Tennis and Basketball courts, newly renovated playground equipment, and sand volleyball court.
- Memorial Park (built in 1942) includes a shelterhouse and a children's play area in its shady location just up the hill east from the town's swimming pool. Following WW2, the American Legion set and dedicated the memorial boulder in recognition of the town's servicemen and women. The Moville Woman's Club along with the City recently renovated the shelter house to include an indoor and outdoor seating area, and Eagle Scout Ryan Fouts led a project to replace the playground equipment. In 2021, the Woodbury Central ‘Class of 1970’ added a Sensory Area Playground in memory of classmate Chuck Logan.
- Veterans Park (built 2005) is a block south of Main Street and its landmark flagpole. It was presented to the city by Dr. EE & Helen (Logan) Maxwell.
- Ridge Park (north end of Park Ridge Place) includes new children's play area and seating.
- Midway Park (built 1955) is the site of an abandoned state gravel pit situated about midway between the towns of Moville, Kingsley, Iowa and Pierson, Iowa. The north pit was once safe for swimming, so a sandy beach was formed, lifeguards were put on duty, a bath-house was constructed and trees were planted. The south side of the gravel pit was for fishing, boating and picnicking. In the early 1980s, the park was turned over to the direction of the Woodbury County Board of Supervisors; it is no longer a swimming area but is used for ice fishing, and summer picnics and fishing.
- Jack Haskell Swimming Pool
- Ann Walker Basketball Courts

== Arts and culture ==
- Woodbury County Library dates back to 1929 when it was organized by the Moville Woman's Club and called the Moville Public Library. By 1943, the library was developing so rapidly that its board of directors asked the Moville Town Council to assume full responsibility for it. On Nov. 3, 1948, the Woodbury County Library was voted into existence, and established its headquarters in Moville in August 1950. In 1954, it merged with the Woodbury County Library and added its book collection of approximately 4,000 volumes, many of which came from the personal libraries of members of the Moville Woman's Club as well as other local citizens. Once merged with the county library system, the circulation of the Woodbury County Library during its first year was 22,422. By 1961, it had increased to a circulation of more than 125,000 (30,000 volumes) in its county-wide system. By 1987, the library included more than 60,000 volumes and 1,000 film strips, with a circulation of more than 90,000 among the 12,000 residents it served. Board members include a person from each of the following towns in Woodbury County: Lawton, Moville, Hornick, Danbury, Anthon, Bronson and Pierson. In July 2006, the library moved from its former location amongst downtown Moville into the newly built Moville Community Center, located on land donated by Robert L. and Carol Logan of Moville.

=== Annual events ===
Moville is home to the annual Woodbury County Fair, which attracts visitors and exhibits from all around Siouxland. Grandstand events attract the largest crowds, and include a tractor pull, musical performances, and demolition derby.

The town also hosts an annual Moville Days celebration, usually around the beginning of June.

== Education ==
Moville is home to the Woodbury Central Community School District, and home of the Woodbury Central Wildcats.

== Notable people ==
- Roy S. Armstrong, member of the South Dakota House of Representatives
