= Lawton, Iowa =

- City
- Location of Lawton, Iowa
- Coordinates: 42°28′37″N 96°11′06″W
- Country: USA
- State: Iowa
- County: Woodbury

Government
  - Mayor: Rod Hamm

Area
  - Total: 0.72 sq mi (1.86 km^{2})
  - Land: 0.72 sq mi (1.86 km^{2})
  - Water: 0 sq mi (0.00 km^{2})
- Elevation: 1,178 ft (359 m)

Population (2020)
  - Total: 943
  - Density: 1,310.2/sq mi (505.88/km^{2})
- Time zone: UTC-6 (Central (CST))
  - Summer (DST): UTC-5 (CDT)
- ZIP code: 51030
- Area code: 712
- FIPS code: 19-43905
- GNIS feature ID: 2395651
- Website: www.lawtoniowa.com

Lawton is a city in Woodbury County, Iowa, Iowa, United States. It is part of the Sioux City metropolitan area. The population was 943 at the time of the 2020 census.

== History ==
Lawton was platted in 1901. It was named for J. C. Law, an early settler and native of Lawton, Michigan. A post office has been in operation in Lawton since 1902.

== Geography ==
According to the United States Census Bureau, the city has a total area of 0.71 square miles (1.84 km^{2}), all land. It is located seven miles east of Sioux City on U.S. Route 20, in a region of rolling fertile farmland. Lawton is considered a bedroom community for Sioux City.

== Demographics ==
Historical populations
Year	Pop.	±%
1910	138	—
1920	243	+76.1%
1930	259	+6.6%
1940	263	+1.5%
1950	254	−3.4%
1960	324	+27.6%
1970	406	+25.3%
1980	447	+10.1%
1990	482	+7.8%
2000	697	+44.6%
2010	908	+30.3%
2020	943	+3.9%
Source:"U.S. Census website". United States Census Bureau. and Iowa Data Center; Source: U.S. Decennial Census

=== 2020 census ===
As of the census of 2020, there were 943 people, 349 households, and 251 families residing in the city. The population density was 1,310.2 inhabitants per square mile (505.9/km^{2}). There were 393 housing units at an average density of 546.0 per square mile (210.8/km^{2}). The racial makeup of the city was 96.6% White, 0.2% Black or African American, 0.1% Native American, 0.0% Asian, 0.0% Pacific Islander, 0.3% from other races and 2.8% from two or more races. Hispanic or Latino persons of any race comprised 2.8% of the population.

Of the 349 households, 40.7% of which had children under the age of 18 living with them, 60.7% were married couples living together, 4.3% were cohabitating couples, 21.5% had a female householder with no spouse or partner present and 13.5% had a male householder with no spouse or partner present. 28.1% of all households were non-families. 24.4% of all households were made up of individuals, 10.3% had someone living alone who was 65 years old or older.

The median age in the city was 38.9 years. 31.8% of the residents were under the age of 20; 4.5% were between the ages of 20 and 24; 23.6% were from 25 and 44; 26.9% were from 45 and 64; and 13.1% were 65 years of age or older. The gender makeup of the city was 50.1% male and 49.9% female.

=== 2010 census ===
As of the census of 2010, there were 908 people, 342 households, and 238 families living in the city. The population density was 1,278.9 inhabitants per square mile (493.8/km^{2}). There were 352 housing units at an average density of 495.8 per square mile (191.4/km^{2}). The racial makeup of the city was 98.8% White, 0.2% African American, 0.1% Native American, 0.2% Asian, and 0.7% from two or more races. Hispanic or Latino of any race were 0.4% of the population.

There were 342 households, of which 38.9% had children under the age of 18 living with them, 61.7% were married couples living together, 5.8% had a female householder with no husband present, 2.0% had a male householder with no wife present, and 30.4% were non-families. 27.8% of all households were made up of individuals, and 16.1% had someone living alone who was 65 years of age or older. The average household size was 2.64 and the average family size was 3.27.

The median age in the city was 36.1 years. 30.8% of residents were under the age of 18; 6.6% were between the ages of 18 and 24; 25.7% were from 25 to 44; 22.7% were from 45 to 64; and 14.3% were 65 years of age or older. The gender makeup of the city was 48.9% male and 51.1% female.

=== 2000 census ===
As of the census of 2000, there were 697 people, 255 households, and 205 families living in the city. The population density was 1,372.3 inhabitants per square mile (529.8/km^{2}). There were 269 housing units at an average density of 529.6 per square mile (204.5/km^{2}). The racial makeup of the city was 99.57% White, 0.14% Asian, and 0.29% from two or more races.

There were 255 households, out of which 41.2% had children under the age of 18 living with them, 70.2% were married couples living together, 7.5% had a female householder with no husband present, and 19.6% were non-families. 16.5% of all households were made up of individuals, and 8.6% had someone living alone who was 65 years of age or older. The average household size was 2.71 and the average family size was 3.06.

29.8% are under the age of 18, 6.6% from 18 to 24, 32.0% from 25 to 44, 19.2% from 45 to 64, and 12.3% who were 65 years of age or older. The median age was 35 years. For every 100 females, there were 89.4 males. For every 100 females age 18 and over, there were 88.8 males.

The median income for a household in the city was $52,917, and the median income for a family was $58,750. Males had a median income of $37,011 versus $21,023 for females. The per capita income for the city was $18,432. About 4.3% of families and 6.8% of the population were below the poverty line, including 6.8% of those under age 18 and 2.5% of those age 65 or over.

== Education ==
Lawton–Bronson Community School District operates public schools. The district was established on July 1, 1966, by the merger of the Lawton and Bronson districts.
