= Kingsley, Iowa =

- City
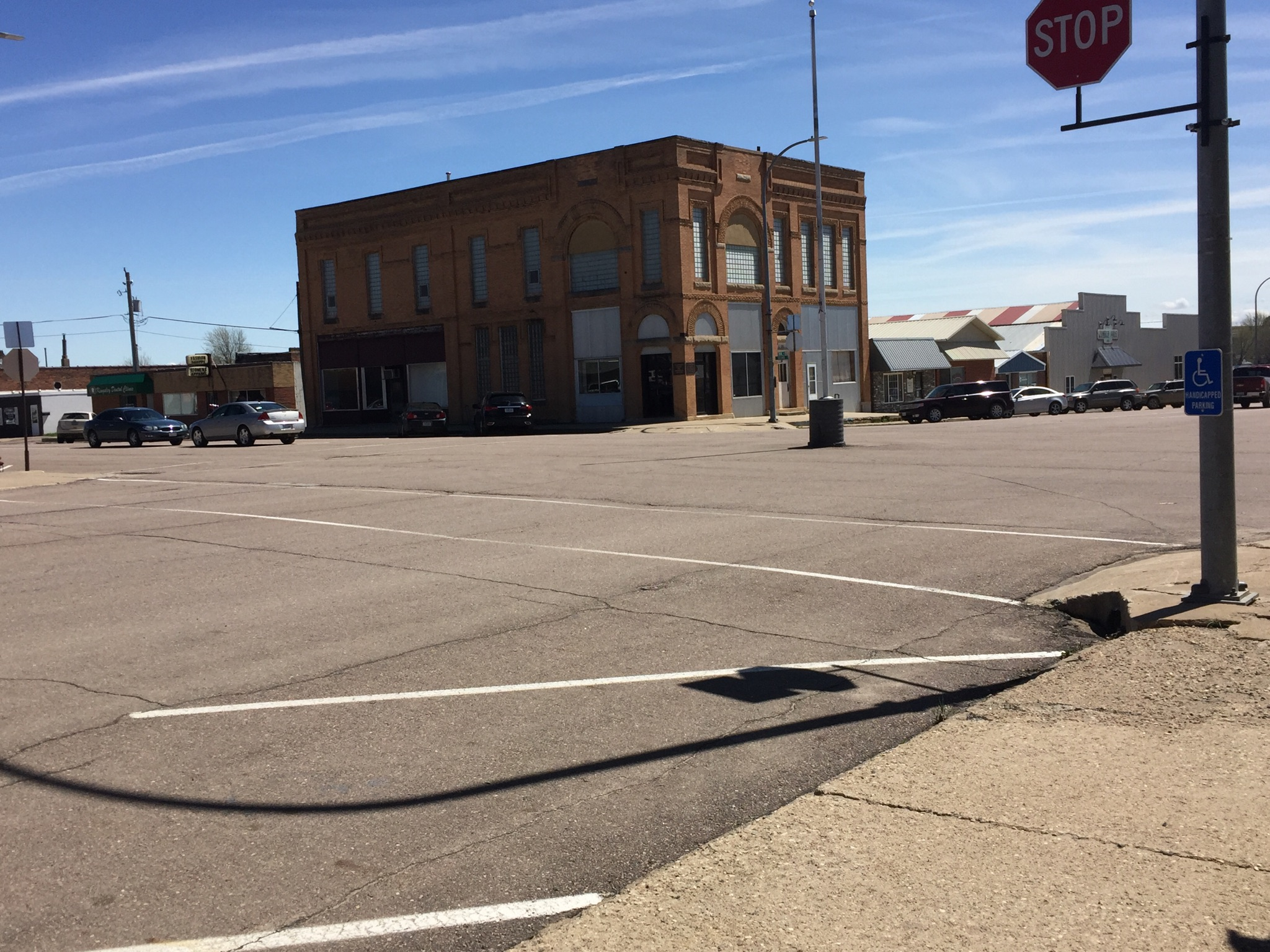
- Downtown Kingsley
- Motto: Some Bigger. None Better.
- Location of Kingsley, Iowa
- Coordinates: 42°35′11″N 95°58′05″W
- Country: USA
- State: Iowa
- County: Plymouth

Government
  - Type: Mayor–council

Area
  - Total: 1.61 sq mi (4.18 km^{2})
  - Land: 1.61 sq mi (4.18 km^{2})
  - Water: 0 sq mi (0.00 km^{2})
- Elevation: 1,240 ft (380 m)

Population (2020)
  - Total: 1,396
  - Density: 865.0/sq mi (333.97/km^{2})
- Time zone: UTC-6 (Central (CST))
  - Summer (DST): UTC-5 (CDT)
- ZIP code: 51028
- Area code: 712
- FIPS code: 19-41385
- GNIS feature ID: 2395537
- Website: www.kingsleyia.com

Kingsley is a city in Plymouth County, Iowa, United States, which is located within Garfield Township. The population was 1,396 at the time of the 2020 census. The city was originally known as the village Quorn, which was founded by two brothers, Frederick and William B. Close. Quorn was named after the Quorn Hunt in England. The village was later relocated to a different part of Iowa and named Kingsley due to a railroad not running through the original area. The railroad was designed by the Chicago and North Western Transportation Company. Kingsley was founded on January 15, 1884, and the centennial celebration was held in June 1984. Kingsley includes organizations, recreational activities, and a local government consisting of a mayor and a city council. The schools are an elementary school and a high school, with the middle school being located in Pierson.

Recreational additions include a golf course and a public swimming pool. The city has a public library and published a newspaper titled The Kingsley News-Times, now combined with other newspapers to form The Record. There are many businesses and houses within the city limits. United States President Herbert Hoover lived in Kingsley as a child and Cincinnati Reds baseball player Harry Gaspar was born in Kingsley.

== History ==
=== Quorn ===
The city later known as Kingsley was once a village in a different location named Quorn, being named after the Quorn Hunt in England. Quorn was founded by two brothers, Frederick and William B. Close on September 18, 1880. It started with William's and W. Roylance Court Jr.'s 2,000 acre farm, which contained buildings, sheds, and hundreds of livestock. The livestock included sheep, bucks, ewes, cattle, and hogs. Quorn, through investments by the Close brothers, later included a post office, country store, and social center. Quorn continued to grow to include a population of 300 to 400 people and multiple buildings on Main Street.

A railroad was being built and the population of Quorn hoped that it would go through the village on its way to Sioux City, Iowa. However, the railroad did not go through Quorn. One of the many ideas about why the railroad took a different route was due to a disagreement between the Chicago and North Western Transportation Company and the Close brothers. The actual reason is still unknown. Due to the railroad being the main mode of transportation of goods, the residents had no choice but to relocate to a new area. Every business except for a mill was moved to a new area during 1883.

=== Current site ===
Founded on January 15, 1884, Kingsley was named after Nahum P. Kingsley who had laid out the city on June 4, 1883. A centennial celebration was held on three days in June 1984. Former United States President Ronald Reagan wrote of the centennial, "The spirit which has built and sustained your community reflects the energy which has forged America into a land of wonder. As a community held by fellowship and goodwill, Kingsley has become home to many who love it dearly". In June 1894, a 1,500 gallon water tower was used to pump water. In October 1905, the water tower collapsed so a new steel tower was built in January 1906. In 1915, yet another new water tower was built to replace the 1906 water tower. In 1912, a sewer system and 2,775 feet of pipe were laid. The sewer system was expanded on in 1968.

In June 1990, a public swimming pool named the Loring Aquatic Center was opened. The 1893 grain elevator was burned down in 1996 and used as practice by firefighters. In June 2000, new playground equipment was added to Kingsley's park. Kingsley received high speed internet in May 2002. In December 2003, a final water tower was built and was completed on May 24, 2004. In 2005 through 2006, a walking trail was completed. In June 2008, a new water main was built. On August 17, 2009, it was reported that Kingsley had 80 businesses. From 2001 to 2009, almost 70 houses have been built.

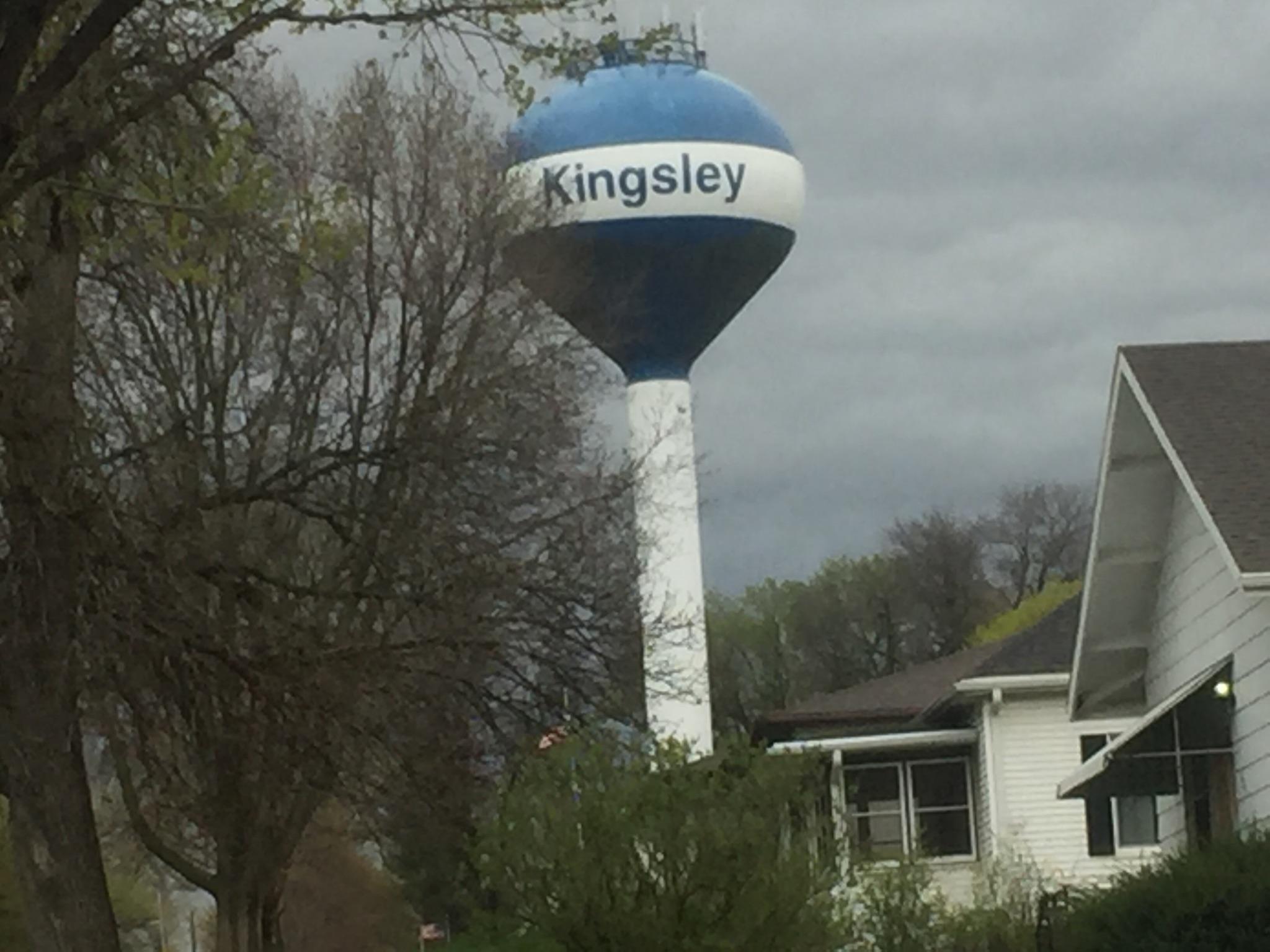
The former water tower

=== Organizations ===
Shortly after Quorn was founded, an anonymous organization calling themselves The Spooks was started. Each Christmas, the members provided free food and clothing to the needy in Quorn and then in Kingsley. Their membership was small and only the members themselves knew who was a part of the organization. All members wear masks and they are still in operation in Kingsley. The Women's Kingsley Community Action Club was founded in June 1980 as a splinter group of the Men's KCAC. It was started with the plan to help summer programs for Kingsley's youth. The city once published the newspaper The Kingsley-News Times that began publication in 1887. The local newspaper was founded by J. H. Strief, who later became president of the Iowa State Federation of Labor. The Kingsley-News Times was later combined with two other newspapers to form The Record, spreading its coverage to include multiple nearby cities.

== Geography ==
Kingsley is located in Garfield Township within Plymouth County. It is part of the Sioux City metropolitan area which encompasses parts of Iowa, Nebraska and South Dakota. The city is located within the Loess Hills. It was written in a 1990 book that Kingsley is in a "grain and stock region on the Chicago and Northwestern Railroad".

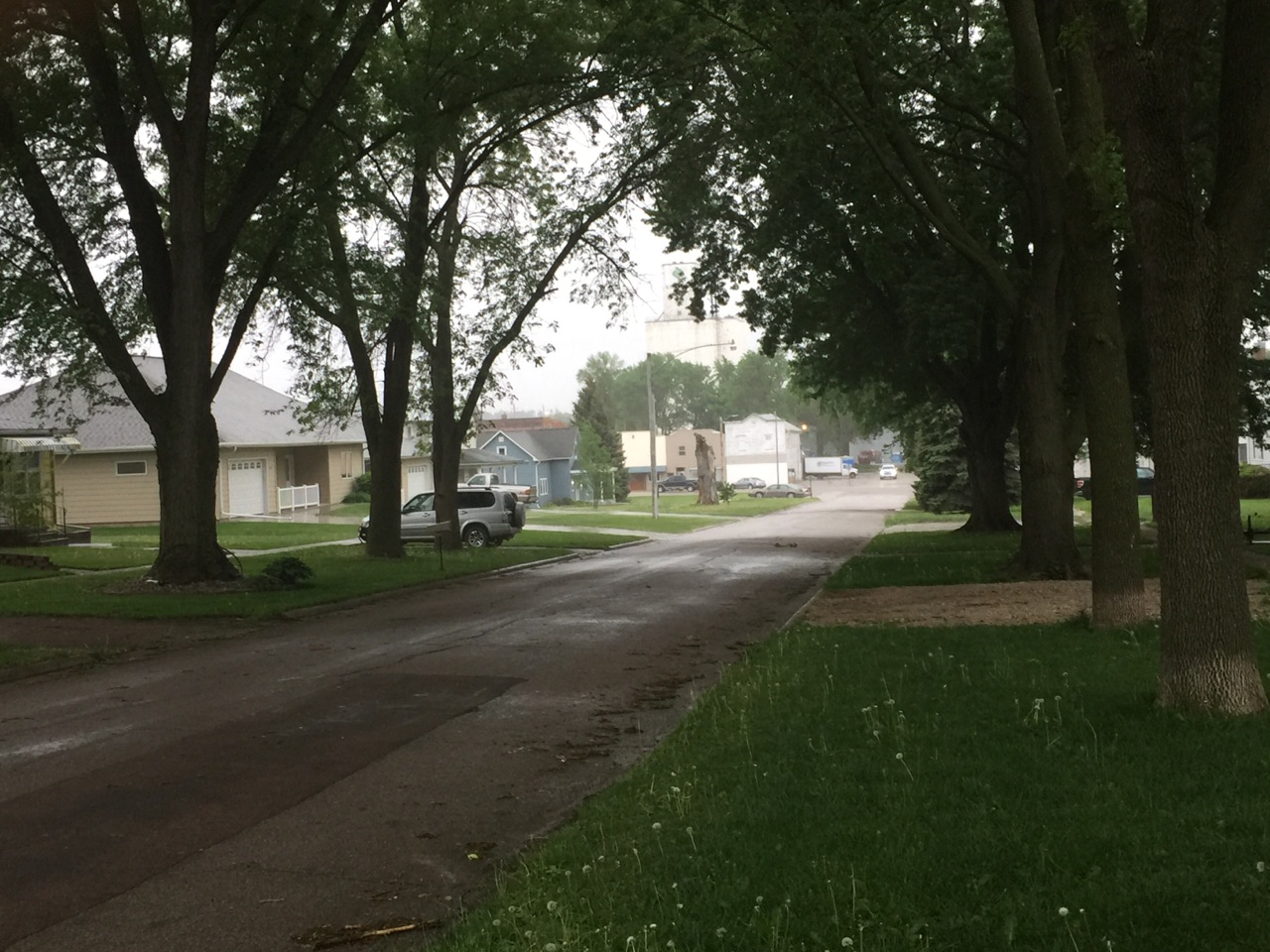
Side street view in Kingsley

According to the United States Census Bureau, the city has a total area of 1.61 square miles (4.17 km^{2}), all land. Kingsley is 1,230 feet [375 m] above sea level. The city is surrounded by farmland and many of the original farms were owned by the Close brothers.

== Demographics ==
Historical populations
Year	Pop.	±%
1890	649	—
1900	720	+10.9%
1910	977	+35.7%
1920	1,072	+9.7%
1930	1,093	+2.0%
1940	1,145	+4.8%
1950	1,098	−4.1%
1960	1,044	−4.9%
1970	1,097	+5.1%
1980	1,209	+10.2%
1990	1,129	−6.6%
2000	1,245	+10.3%
2010	1,411	+13.3%
2020	1,396	−1.1%
Source:"U.S. Census website". United States Census Bureau. and Iowa Data Center; Source: U.S. Decennial Census

=== 2020 census ===
As of the 2020 census, Kingsley had a population of 1,396, with 585 households and 375 families residing in the city. The population density was 865.0 inhabitants per square mile (334.0/km^{2}). There were 626 housing units at an average density of 387.9 per square mile (149.8/km^{2}).

The median age was 43.1 years. 24.5% of residents were under the age of 18, 26.5% were under the age of 20, 5.1% were between the ages of 20 and 24, 21.2% were from 25 to 44, 24.2% were from 45 to 64, and 23.0% were 65 years of age or older. For every 100 females there were 91.5 males, and for every 100 females age 18 and over there were 87.5 males age 18 and over.

There were 585 households, of which 29.6% had children under the age of 18 living in them. Of all households, 53.0% were married-couple households, 5.0% were cohabiting-couple households, 16.1% were households with a male householder and no spouse or partner present, and 26.0% were households with a female householder and no spouse or partner present. 35.9% of households were non-families, 32.5% were made up of individuals, and 17.9% had someone living alone who was 65 years of age or older.

0.0% of residents lived in urban areas, while 100.0% lived in rural areas.

There were 626 housing units, of which 6.5% were vacant. The homeowner vacancy rate was 1.3% and the rental vacancy rate was 9.7%.

Racial composition as of the 2020 census
Race	Number	Percent
White	1,337	95.8%
Black or African American	8	0.6%
American Indian and Alaska Native	1	0.1%
Asian	1	0.1%
Native Hawaiian and Other Pacific Islander	2	0.1%
Some other race	3	0.2%
Two or more races	44	3.2%
Hispanic or Latino (of any race)	31	2.2%

=== 2010 census ===
As of the census of 2010, there were 1,411 people, 563 households, and 373 families residing in the city. The racial makeup of the city was 98.9% White, 0.2% African American, 0.3% Native American, 0.1% Asian, 0.6% Pacific Islander, and 0.3% from two or more races. Hispanic or Latino of any race were 1.3% of the population.

There were 563 households, of which 29.8% had children under the age of 18 living with them, 57.7% were married couples living together, 5.7% had a female householder with no husband present, 2.8% had a male householder with no wife present, and 33.7% were non-families. 31.1% of all households were made up of individuals under 18 years of age, and 37.1% had individuals who were 65 years of age or older. The average household size was 2.44 and the average family size was 3.03. The median age in the city was 41.2 years. The gender makeup of the city was 47.6% male and 52.4% female.

=== 2000 census ===
As of the census of 2000, there were 1,245 people, 524 households, and 344 families residing in the city. The racial makeup of the city was 98.5% White, 0.24% Native American, 0.3% Asian, 0.2% Pacific Islander, and 0.7% from two or more races. Hispanic or Latino of any race were 0.3% of the population.

There were 524 households, out of which 28.6% had children under the age of 18 living with them, 57.8% were married couples living together, 6.3% had a female householder with no husband present, and 34.2% were non-families. 32.8% of all households were made up of individuals, and 20.6% had someone living alone who was 65 years of age or older. The average household size was 2.30 and the average family size was 2.92.

== Government ==
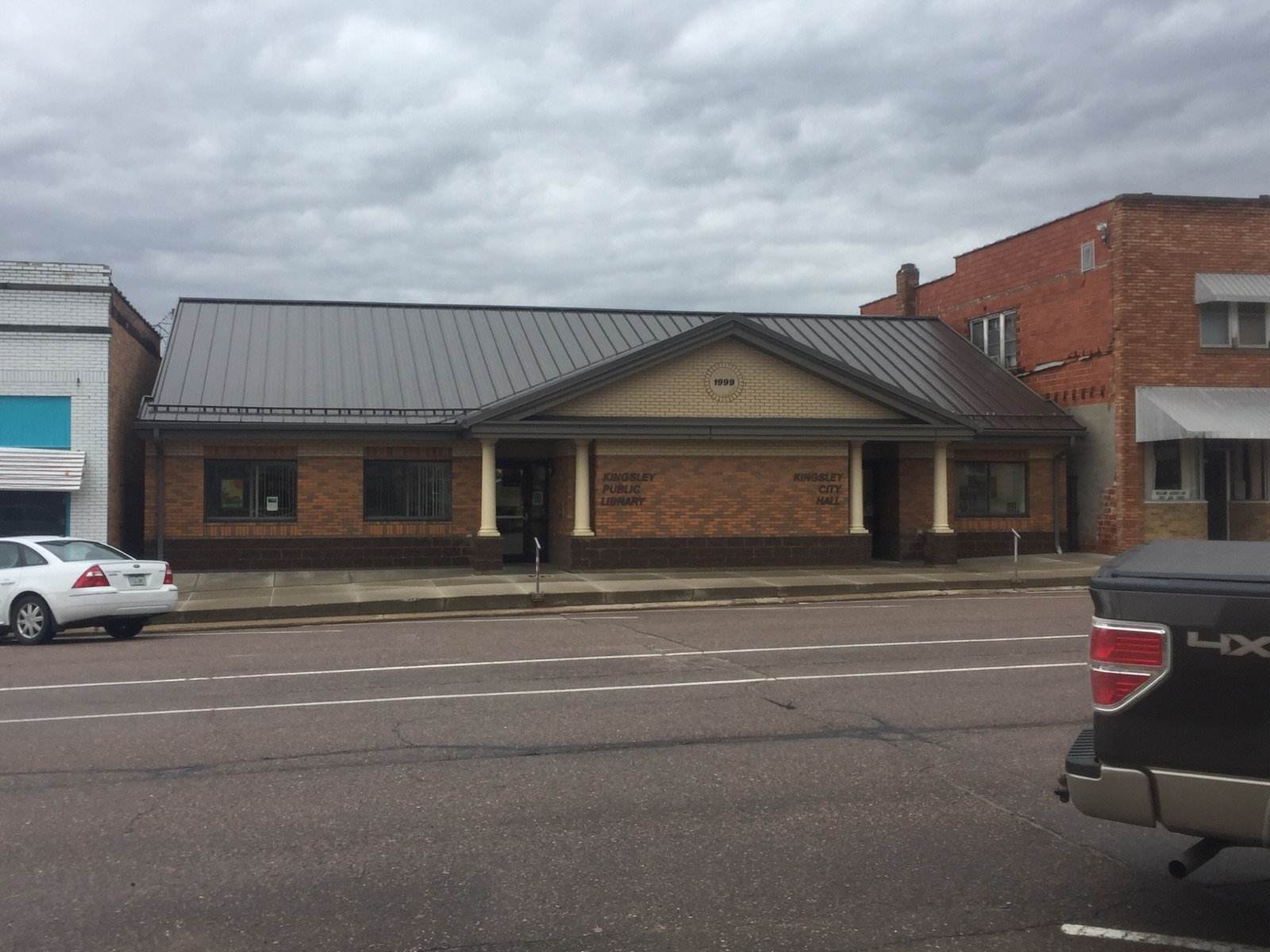
The public library and city hall

The local government includes a mayor and city council members.

A library and city hall combination began construction in May 1999 with $400,000 raised from the city and the rest of the funds coming from the library and grants. The staff started working from the new building in February 2000. Mayors from the beginning of Kingsley's founding were J. S. Ellis (1884), G. A. Garrard (1885 and 1886), C. B. Oldfield (1887 to 1989), and F. R. Robinson (1890).

The Kingsley Public Library is the town's only library. The original building was built in 1967, later being redone in 1999 to house both the library and the city hall. It includes a large selection of books and DVDs. There are public computers for use by patrons and a story hour for children. The library also participates in an inter-library loan program.

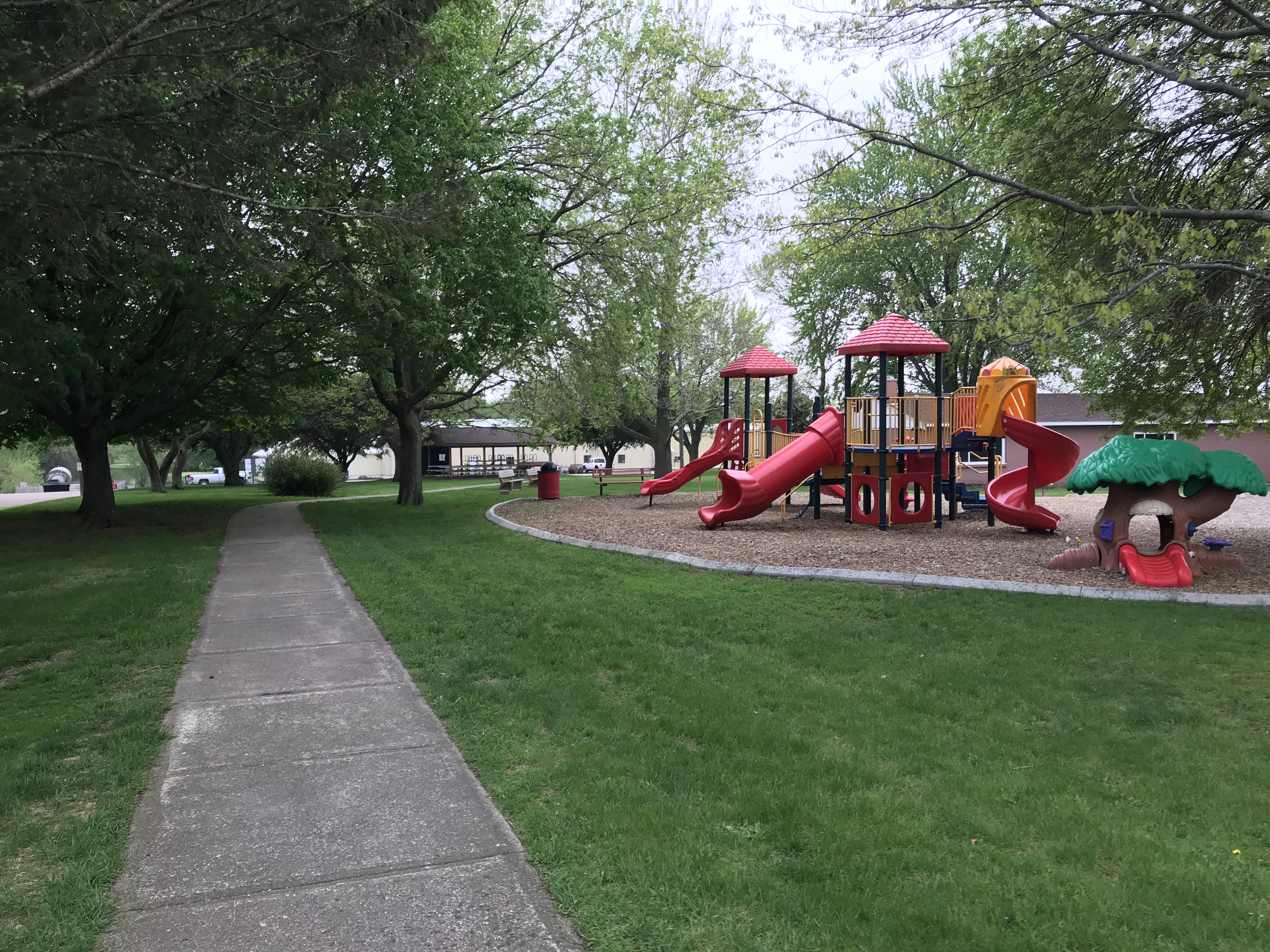
Kingsley, Iowa playground.

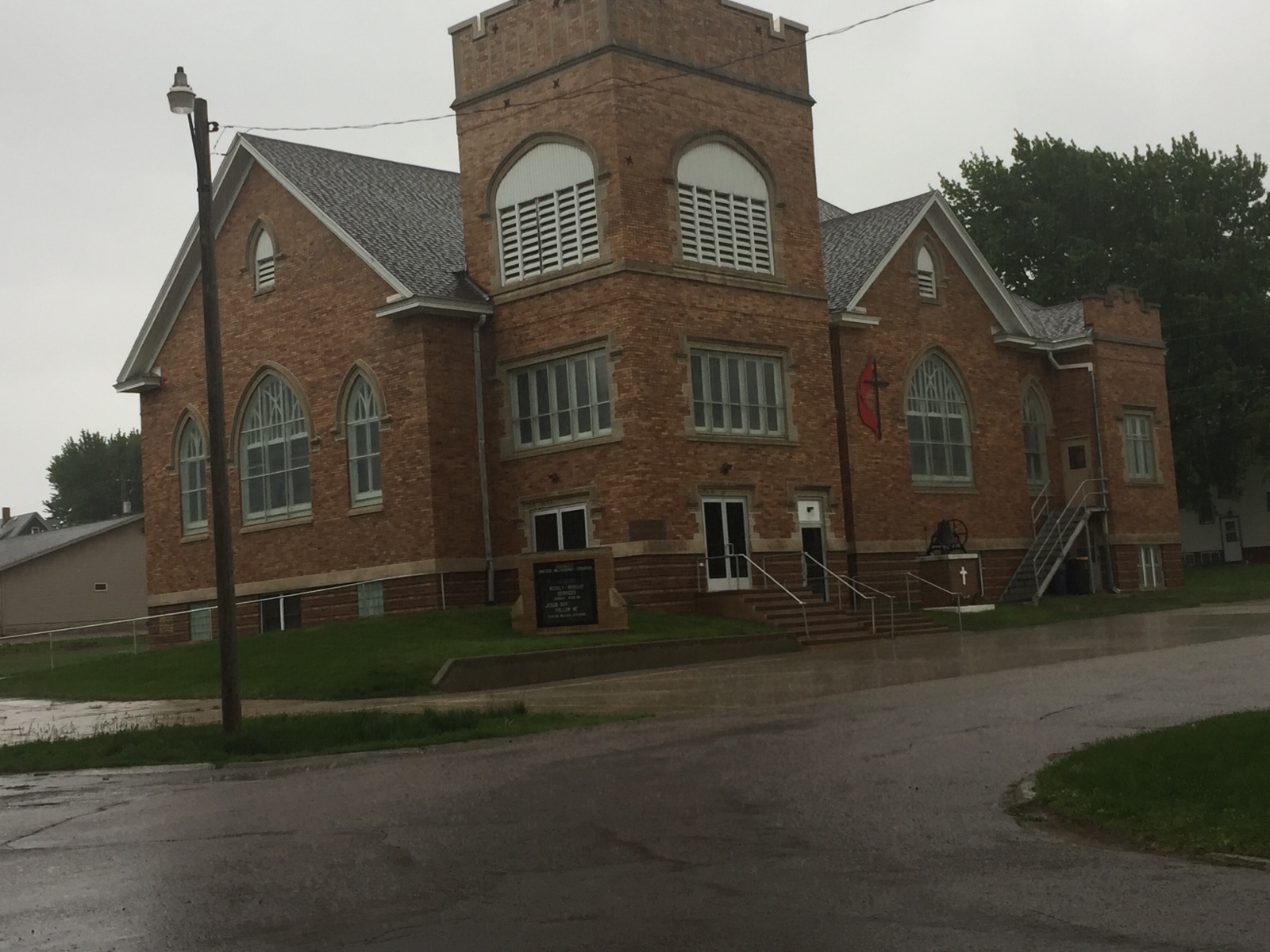
United Methodist Church

== Education ==
The town has Kingsley Elementary School and Kingsley–Pierson High School, both at the same address. The middle school students attend classes in Pierson, Iowa. The elementary school serves 163 students and the high school serves 139 students. All three schools are collectively known as the Kingsley–Pierson Community School District. The high school student to teacher ratio is 10:1, compared to the national average of 16:1. High school sports teams include Boys' Varsity Basketball, Girls Basketball, and Track & Field. The school district has been ranked 74 of 215 for 2017 Best High School for Athletes in Iowa.

== Recreation ==
Kingsley has a public swimming pool called the Loring Aquatic & Fitness Center, Brookside Golf Course, a park, a walking trail, and a community center. It also has five churches of multiple religious denominations.

== Transportation ==
Iowa Highway 140 passes straight by Kingsley, going by the Brookside Golf Course and ending at the beginning of Main Street. The highway is 1 km parallel to Kingsley. The Siouxland Community Transit System serves all of Plymouth County, among other nearby counties.

== Notable people ==
- Cincinnati Reds baseball player Harry Gaspar was born in Kingsley.
- Alabama Crimson Tide football offensive coordinator Ryan Grubb was born in Kingsley.
- President Herbert Hoover lived in Kingsley as a child with his grandmother.
