= Sloan, Iowa =

- City
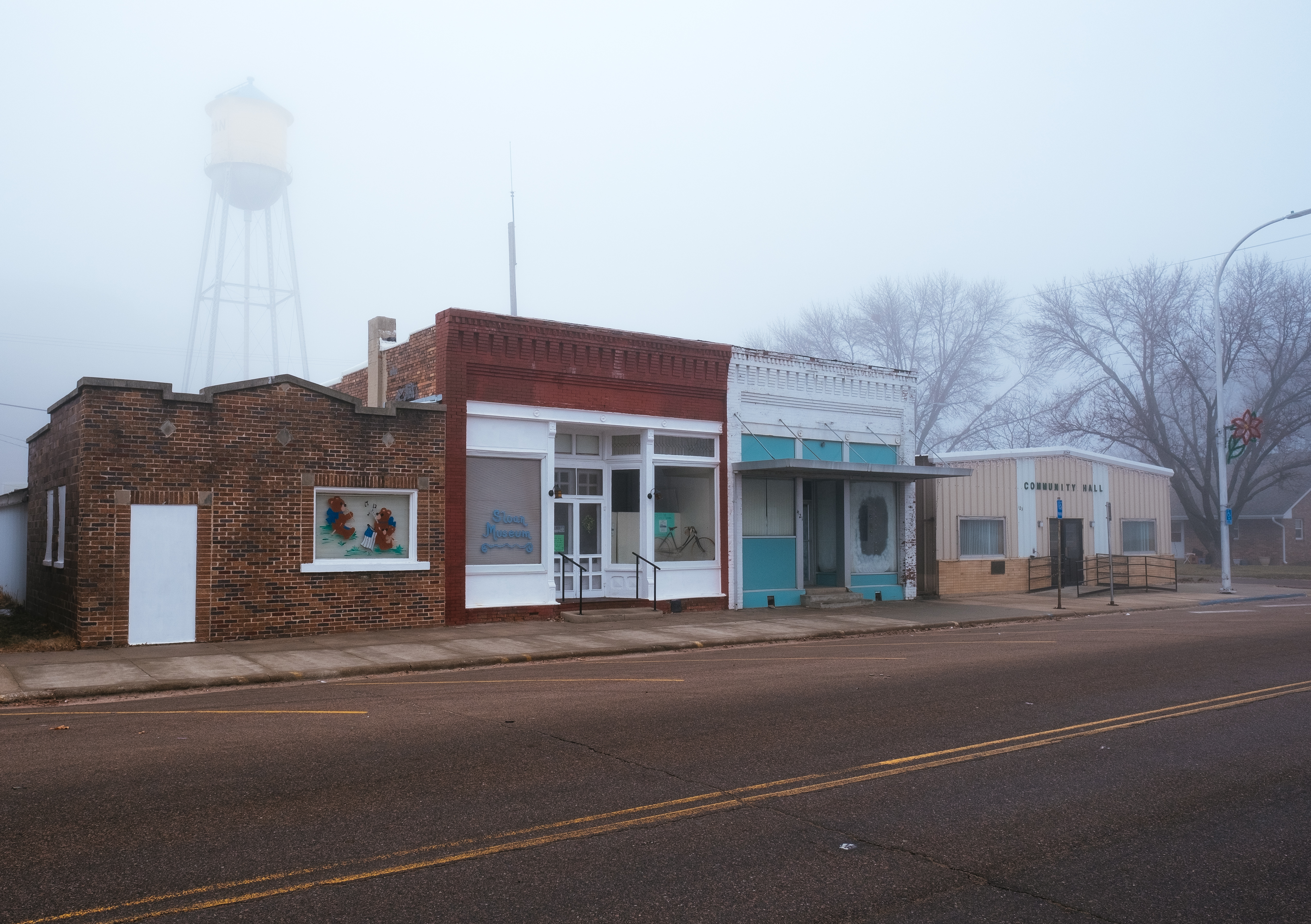
- Evans Street looking west

- Location of Sloan, Iowa
- Coordinates: 42°13′59″N 96°13′29″W
- Country: USA
- State: Iowa
- County: Woodbury

Area
  - Total: 0.58 sq mi (1.50 km^{2})
  - Land: 0.58 sq mi (1.50 km^{2})
  - Water: 0 sq mi (0.00 km^{2})
- Elevation: 1,073 ft (327 m)

Population (2020)
  - Total: 1,042
  - Density: 1,801.4/sq mi (695.53/km^{2})
- Time zone: UTC-6 (Central (CST))
  - Summer (DST): UTC-5 (CDT)
- ZIP code: 51055
- Area code: 712
- FIPS code: 19-73605
- GNIS feature ID: 2395899
- Website: sloania.com

Sloan is a city in Woodbury County, Iowa, United States. It is part of the Sioux City, IA–NE–SD Metropolitan Statistical Area. The population was 1,042 at the time of the 2020 census.

== History ==
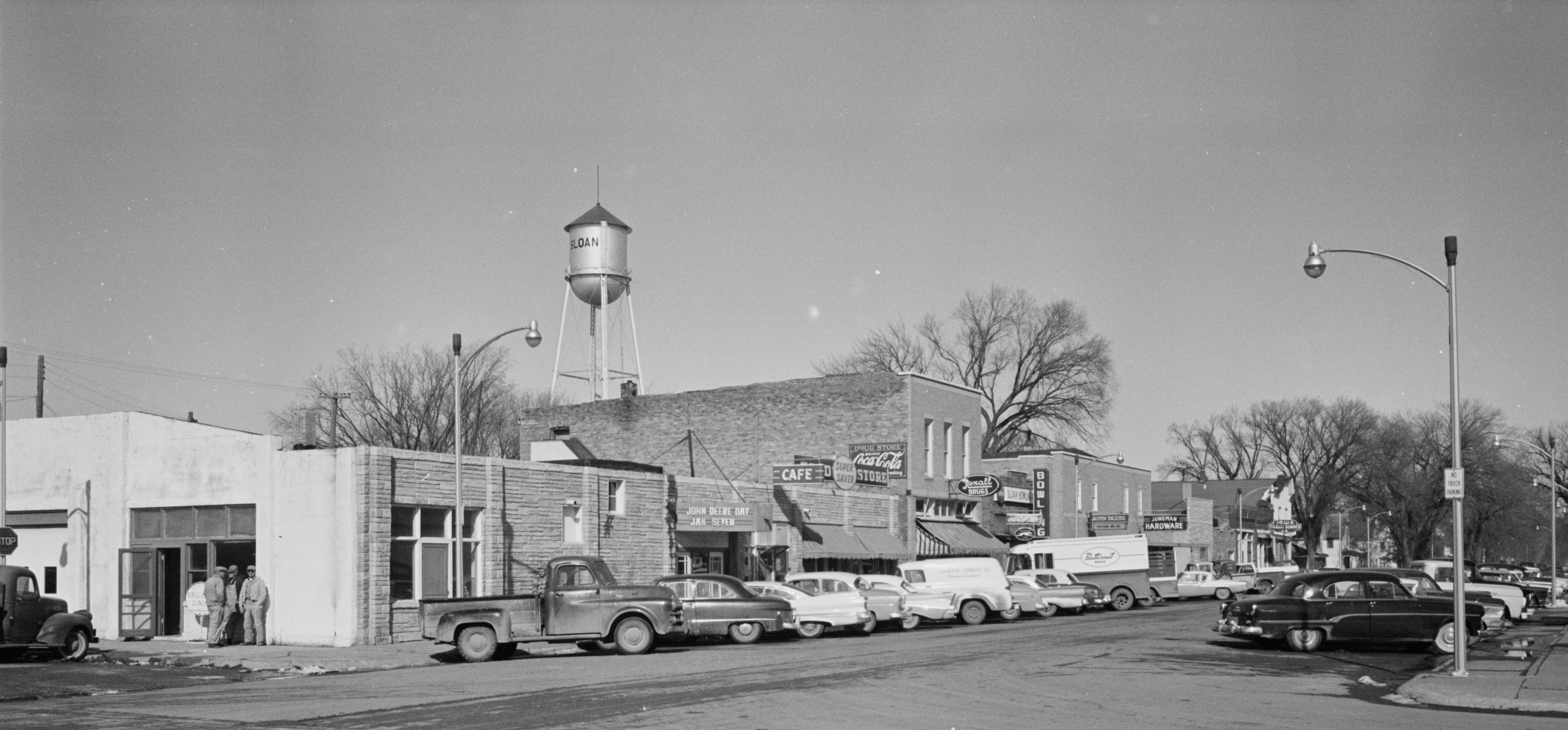
Sloan in 1961

Sloan was platted in 1870 by the president of the Sioux City & Pacific Railway. The city was named for Samuel Sloan, a railroad official.

== Economy ==
The Winnebago Tribe of Nebraska (Ho-Chunk) has the WinnaVegas Casino near Sloan.

== Geography ==
According to the United States Census Bureau, the city has a total area of 0.62 square miles (1.61 km^{2}), all land. The town is on the floodplain of the Missouri River, and is located near Interstate 29.

== Demographics ==
Historical populations
| Year | Pop. | ±% |
|---|---|---|
| 1890 | 449 | — |
| 1900 | 643 | +43.2% |
| 1910 | 547 | −14.9% |
| 1920 | 608 | +11.2% |
| 1930 | 636 | +4.6% |
| 1940 | 628 | −1.3% |
| 1950 | 654 | +4.1% |
| 1960 | 704 | +7.6% |
| 1970 | 799 | +13.5% |
| 1980 | 978 | +22.4% |
| 1990 | 938 | −4.1% |
| 2000 | 1,032 | +10.0% |
| 2010 | 973 | −5.7% |
| 2020 | 1,042 | +7.1% |
Source:"U.S. Census website". United States Census Bureau. and Iowa Data Center; Source: U.S. Decennial Census

=== 2020 census ===
As of the 2020 census, Sloan had a population of 1,042. The population density was 1,801.4 inhabitants per square mile (695.5/km^{2}). The median age was 41.0 years, and 25.1% of residents were under the age of 18.

The age distribution was 27.2% under the age of 20, 5.3% from 20 to 24, 23.2% from 25 to 44, 23.1% from 45 to 64, and 21.2% age 65 or older. The gender makeup of the city was 47.5% male and 52.5% female. For every 100 females, there were 90.5 males; for every 100 females age 18 and over, there were 89.3 males age 18 and over.

There were 434 households and 297 families in Sloan, of which 34.3% had children under the age of 18 living with them. Of all households, 52.8% were married-couple households, 7.4% were cohabiting-couple households, 25.6% had a female householder with no spouse or partner present, and 14.3% had a male householder with no spouse or partner present. About 31.6% of households were non-families, 25.8% were made up of individuals, and 13.1% had someone living alone who was 65 years of age or older.

There were 451 housing units at an average density of 779.7 per square mile (301.0/km^{2}). Of all housing units, 3.8% were vacant; the homeowner vacancy rate was 0.0% and the rental vacancy rate was 5.7%. 0.0% of residents lived in urban areas, while 100.0% lived in rural areas.

Racial composition as of the 2020 census
| Race | Number | Percent |
|---|---|---|
| White | 963 | 92.4% |
| Black or African American | 0 | 0.0% |
| American Indian and Alaska Native | 19 | 1.8% |
| Asian | 4 | 0.4% |
| Native Hawaiian and Other Pacific Islander | 0 | 0.0% |
| Some other race | 14 | 1.3% |
| Two or more races | 42 | 4.0% |
| Hispanic or Latino (of any race) | 27 | 2.6% |

=== 2010 census ===
As of the census of 2010, there were 973 people, 421 households, and 269 families living in the city. The population density was 1,569.4 inhabitants per square mile (605.9/km^{2}). There were 447 housing units at an average density of 721.0 per square mile (278.4/km^{2}). The racial makeup of the city was 96.9% White, 2.2% Native American, 0.1% Asian, 0.5% from other races, and 0.3% from two or more races. Hispanic or Latino of any race were 1.8% of the population.

There were 421 households, of which 30.6% had children under the age of 18 living with them, 50.8% were married couples living together, 9.7% had a female householder with no husband present, 3.3% had a male householder with no wife present, and 36.1% were non-families. 31.8% of all households were made up of individuals, and 12.6% had someone living alone who was 65 years of age or older. The average household size was 2.31 and the average family size was 2.91.

The median age in the city was 41.7 years. 23.8% of residents were under the age of 18; 5.6% were between the ages of 18 and 24; 24.4% were from 25 to 44; 30.1% were from 45 to 64; and 16.3% were 65 years of age or older. The gender makeup of the city was 47.2% male and 52.8% female.

=== 2000 census ===
As of the census of 2000, there were 1,032 people, 427 households, and 284 families living in the city. The population density was 2,217.4 inhabitants per square mile (856.1/km^{2}). There were 449 housing units at an average density of 964.7 per square mile (372.5/km^{2}). The racial makeup of the city was 97.38% White, 0.10% African American, 1.16% Native American, 0.29% Asian, and 1.07% from two or more races. Hispanic or Latino of any race were 0.87% of the population.

There were 427 households, out of which 35.4% had children under the age of 18 living with them, 54.8% were married couples living together, 8.4% had a female householder with no husband present, and 33.3% were non-families. 31.4% of all households were made up of individuals, and 17.1% had someone living alone who was 65 years of age or older. The average household size was 2.42 and the average family size was 3.04.

28.1% are under the age of 18, 6.5% from 18 to 24, 26.1% from 25 to 44, 23.4% from 45 to 64, and 16.0% who were 65 years of age or older. The median age was 38 years. For every 100 females, there were 85.6 males. For every 100 females age 18 and over, there were 81.9 males.

The median income for a household in the city was $38,026, and the median income for a family was $50,667. Males had a median income of $33,393 versus $23,068 for females. The per capita income for the city was $17,310. About 4.0% of families and 6.6% of the population were below the poverty line, including 8.6% of those under age 18 and 7.3% of those age 65 or over.
