= National Register of Historic Places listings in Greene County, Iowa =

Location of Greene County in Iowa

This is a list of the National Register of Historic Places listings in Greene County, Iowa.

This is intended to be a complete list of the properties and districts on the National Register of Historic Places in Greene County, Iowa, United States. Latitude and longitude coordinates are provided for many National Register properties and districts; these locations may be seen together in a map.

There are 17 properties and districts listed on the National Register in the county.

This National Park Service list is complete through NPS recent listings posted March 21, 2025.

	Name on the Register	Image	Date listed	Location	City or town	Description
1	Chicago, Milwaukee & St. Paul Depot-Jefferson	Chicago, Milwaukee & St. Paul Depot-Jefferson	September 30, 1994 (#93000326)	507 E. Lincoln Way; 42°00′54″N 94°22′05″W	Jefferson	
2	Frantz Round Barn		June 30, 1986 (#86001432)	Off U.S. Route 30; 42°02′19″N 94°12′04″W	Grand Junction	Demolished.
3	George H. Gallup House	George H. Gallup House	July 18, 1985 (#85001581)	703 S. Chestnut St. 42°00′27″N 94°22′23″W	Jefferson	
4	Greene County Courthouse	Greene County Courthouse	December 14, 1978 (#78001222)	E. Lincoln Way and Chestnut St. 42°00′57″N 94°22′26″W	Jefferson	
5	Jefferson Square Commercial Historic District	Jefferson Square Commercial Historic District	November 22, 2011 (#11000503)	Courthouse Sq. and fronting blocks of N. Wilson, N. Chestnut, E. Lincoln, E. State & 115 S. Wilson Sts. 42°00′57″N 94°22′27″W	Jefferson	
6	Lincoln Highway Marker (1)		March 29, 1993 (#93000163)	Address Restricted	Jefferson	
7	Lincoln Highway Marker (2)		March 29, 1993 (#93000164)	Junction of Lincoln Way and Chestnut St. 42°00′54″N 94°22′05″W	Jefferson	Has been moved or lost.
8	Lincoln Highway-Buttrick's Creek Abandoned Segment	Lincoln Highway-Buttrick's Creek Abandoned Segment	March 29, 1993 (#93000166)	Approximately 3.5 miles east of Jefferson on the southern side of the Buttrick's Creek bridge 42°01′02″N 94°17′43″W	Jefferson	
9	Lincoln Highway-Buttrick's Creek to Grand Junction Segment	Lincoln Highway-Buttrick's Creek to Grand Junction Segment	March 29, 1993 (#93000167)	From Buttrick's Creek east to Iowa Highway 144; 42°01′21″N 94°15′52″W	Grand Junction	
10	Lincoln Highway-Grand Junction Segment	Lincoln Highway-Grand Junction Segment	March 29, 1993 (#93000168)	Through and 1 mile east of Grand Junction, south of the Chicago & Northwestern railroad line 42°01′54″N 94°13′32″W	Grand Junction	
11	Lincoln Highway-Little Beaver Creek Bridge	Lincoln Highway-Little Beaver Creek Bridge	March 29, 1993 (#93000170)	2.5 miles east and 1 mile north of Grand Junction across Little Beaver Creek; 42°02′57″N 94°10′38″W	Grand Junction	
12	Lincoln Highway-Raccoon River Rural Segment	Lincoln Highway-Raccoon River Rural Segment	March 29, 1993 (#93000162)	County Road E53 approximately 0.1 miles west of Jefferson city limits, going west across the Raccoon River; 42°00′38″N 94°26′02″W	Jefferson	
13	Lincoln Highway-West Beaver Creek Abandoned Segment	Lincoln Highway-West Beaver Creek Abandoned Segment	March 29, 1993 (#93000169)	Approximately 1 mile east of Grand Junction between the Chicago & Northwestern railroad line and U.S. Route 30; 42°02′01″N 94°12′39″W	Grand Junction	
14	Lincoln Highway-West Greene County Rural Segment	Lincoln Highway-West Greene County Rural Segment	March 29, 1993 (#93000161)	North from the junction of U.S. Route 30 and Iowa Highway 25, approximately 0.5 miles north of Scranton, then west to its junction with U.S. Route 30; 42°02′56″N 94°33′09″W	Scranton	
15	Lincoln Statue	Lincoln Statue	March 29, 1993 (#93000165)	Junction of Lincoln Way and Chestnut St. 42°00′56″N 94°22′27″W	Jefferson	
16	St. Patrick's Catholic Church, Cedar	St. Patrick's Catholic Church, Cedar	July 10, 1992 (#92000840)	4 miles west of Churdan on E. 19, 0.5 miles north on a gravel road 42°09′34″N 94°33′05″W	Churdan	
17	Squirrel Hollow County Park Historic District		December 23, 1991 (#91001835)	Eastern bank of the North Raccoon River southeast of Jefferson; 41°57′07″N 94°17′16″W	Jefferson	

== See also ==
- List of National Historic Landmarks in Iowa
- National Register of Historic Places listings in Iowa
- Listings in neighboring counties: Boone, Calhoun, Carroll, Dallas, Guthrie, Webster
