= Rolling Hills Conference (Iowa) =

Former Iowa High School athletic conference

The Rolling Hills Conference was a small-school high school athletic conference in west central Iowa. All of the schools in the conference competed in Class 1A, the smallest in the state.

== Final members ==
Institution	Location	Mascot	Colors	Affiliation	Current Conference
Adair–Casey	Adair	Bombers		Public	Combined with Guthrie Center, competes in the West Central Activities Conference as A-C/GC.
Ankeny Christian Academy	Ankeny	Eagles		Private	Bluegrass Conference
CAM	Anita	Cougars		Public	Rolling Valley Conference
East Greene	Grand Junction	Hawks		Public	Combined with Jefferson–Scranton, competes in the Heart of Iowa Conference as Greene County.
Exira/EH-K	Elk Horn	Spartans		Public	Rolling Valley Conference
Glidden-Ralston	Glidden	Wildcats		Public	Rolling Valley Conference
Grandview Park Baptist	Des Moines	Defenders		Private	Closed in 2014; Grand View Christian School opened in 2014 and competes in the Heart of Iowa Conference.
Iowa Christian Academy	West Des Moines	Trailblazers		Private	Closed in 2018
Paton-Churdan	Churdan	Rockets		Public	Rolling Valley Conference
Orient-Macksburg	Orient	Bulldogs		Public	Bluegrass Conference till closure in 2025
Walnut	Walnut	Warriors		Public	Consolidated with A-H-S-T to form AHSTW, competes in Western Iowa Conference

== History ==
The Rolling Hills Conference was organized in the late 1970s. Original members were Walnut, Elk Horn–Kimballton, Anita, Cumberland-Massena, Bridgewater–Fontanelle, Adair–Casey, Orient-Macksburg, and Exira. They were soon joined by Shelby-Tennant and Carson-Macedonia. Carson-Macedonia left for the Corner Conference in 1986. Anita and Cumberland-Massena merged to become CAM in 1989. Shelby-Tennant left when they merged with AvoHa of Avoca in 1991. Bridgewater–Fontanelle did likewise when they merged with Greenfield in 1993. In 2004, Earlham, who had joined the conference in the late 1990s, left the league to join the West Central Activities Conference, a league covering similar territory that contains larger 1A and smaller 2A schools. Ankeny Christian Academy joined the conference in 2005. The school had only recently started its athletic program and the Rolling Hills was its first conference. In 2007, Paton-Churdan, the smallest school in the West Central Activities Conference, became a member of the Rolling Hills, and in 2009 Glidden-Ralston followed them there. In 2010, East Greene became the third West Central Activities Conference school to jump to the Rolling Hills in the last 4 years, with both Exira and Elk Horn Kimballton sharing in sports at the starts in 2010.

The conference was dissolved after the 2012–13 school year.
