= Rolling Valley Conference =

Iowa High School athletic conference

- Conference: IHSAA / IGHSAU
- Founded: 2013
- Sports fielded: 20
- No. of teams: 10
- Region: Western Iowa
- Website: https://www.rollingvalleyconference.org/

The Rolling Valley Conference is a high school athletic conference in west central Iowa. The league began play in the 2013–14 season. Members include five former members of the Western Valley Activities Conference, five former members of the Rolling Hills Conference, two members of the Western Iowa Conference, and one former member of the West Central Activities Conference.

== Schools ==
School	Location	Mascot	Colors	2026-2027 BEDS
Ar-We-Va	Westside	Rockets		44
Audubon	Audubon	Wheelers		113
Boyer Valley	Dunlap	Bulldogs		97
CAM	Anita	Cougars		98
Coon Rapids–Bayard	Coon Rapids	Crusaders		96
Exira/EH-K	Elk Horn	Spartans		67
Glidden–Ralston	Glidden	Wildcats		69
IKM–Manning	Manning	Wolves		143
Paton-Churdan	Churdan	Rockets		48
Woodbine	Woodbine	Tigers		126

=== Former schools ===
School	Location	Mascot	Colors	Years	Fate
Adair–Casey	Adair	Bombers		2013–2016	Combined with Guthrie Center, competes in the West Central Activities Conference as ACGC.
Charter Oak–Ute	Charter Oak	Bobcats		2013–2017	Combined with MVAO, competes in the Western Valley Activities Conference as MVAOCOU
West Harrison	Mondamin	Hawkeyes		2013–2025	Co-ops with Missouri Valley for all sports, competing in the Western Iowa Conference as Missouri Valley

== History ==
Five members of the conference came from the Western Valley Activities Conference, which was formed in 2008 by the merger of the Maple Valley Conference and the Boyer Valley Conference. All five members of the Rolling Valley were members of the Boyer Valley Conference before the merger. The Boyer Valley league dated to the 1960s and included as many as twelve schools at one time in its history. With the number of members dwindling, they looked into a merger with the Maple Valley Conference. The league was an odd mix of schools, however, as the conference spanned over 160 miles. Also, the conference included schools with a wide range of sizes with the majority of the former Boyer Valley schools much smaller than most of the Maple Valley schools.

Five other league members were part of the Rolling Hills Conference before the formation of the league. The forerunners of CAM and EHK-Exira were charter members of the league when it was founded in the late 1970s. Adair–Casey and Coon Rapids–Bayard were founding members of the new West Central Activities Conference around the same time and Adair–Casey joined the Rolling Hills in 1996. Glidden–Ralston and Paton-Churdan were added to the West Central at that time as replacements for Adair–Casey and other schools. In 2007, Paton-Churdan joined the Rolling Hills and Glidden–Ralston followed in 2009. The Rolling Hills Conference included nine members by the 2012–13 school year, however the nature of the conference had changed in recent years, as the once compact conference had become spread out due to the addition of three private schools in the Des Moines area. Four of the league's members decided to explore the option of forming a new conference with other similar schools. Coon Rapids–Bayard, which had become the smallest and most western member of the West Central Activities Conference following the departures of Paton-Churdan and Glidden–Ralston was also included in the proposed conference. Paton-Churdan was not originally included in the new league, but petitioned to join and were accepted. With Paton-Churdan leaving the conference and Walnut closing its high school, the Rolling Hills Conference played its last season in 2012–13. The four remaining members (Orient-Macksburg and the Christian schools) joined the Bluegrass Conference in 2013.

Charter Oak–Ute began sharing with Maple Valley–Anthon–Oto of the Western Valley Activities Conference during the 2017–18 season.

On February 13, 2025, the West Harrison Community School District announced it would be entering a collaborative agreement with the Missouri Valley Community School District for all athletics in grades 7-12. The teams are to compete under the Missouri Valley Big Reds name and colors. Missouri Valley competes in the Western Iowa Conference.

In June 2025, two schools from the Western Iowa Conference, Audubon Community School District and IKM–Manning Community School District announced they would be joining the Rolling Valley Conference for the 2026-2027 school year.
