= Bristol Township =

Bristol Township may refer to the following places:

== United States ==
- Bristol Township, Kendall County, Illinois
- Bristol Township, Greene County, Iowa
- Bristol Township, Worth County, Iowa
- Bristol Township, Fillmore County, Minnesota
- Bristol Township, Morgan County, Ohio
- Bristol Township, Trumbull County, Ohio
- Bristol Township, Bucks County, Pennsylvania
- Bristol Township, Philadelphia County, Pennsylvania
