= Adaza, Iowa =

- unincorporated community
- Location within Iowa Location within the United States
- Country: United States
- State: Iowa
- County: Greene County
- Time zone: UTC-6 (Central (CST))
  - Summer (DST): UTC-5 (CDT)

Adaza is an unincorporated community in Greene County, Iowa, United States. It is located on County Road E13, three miles northwest of Churdan, at 42.194705N, -94.4969273W.

== History ==
Adaza was founded in 1881, established in Section 7 of Highland Township. A branch of the Chicago, Milwaukee and St. Paul Railroad was built through Adaza. Originally, the site was known as Cottonwood, but was renamed by Captain Albert Head, who visited the site in 1882. The first store in Adaza opened in 1892. A larger railroad depot was built in 1899. A tornado hit the Adaza area in 1902, destroying several nearby farms. Two churches were built at Adaza, both in 1902: the Church of Christ and the Methodist Episcopal church; the latter was rebuilt in 1907 after a devastating fire. Residents of Adaza considered incorporation as a city in 1907, but Adaza was never incorporated.

Adaza's population was 25 in 1902, and 18 in 1925. The population was 100 in 1940.
