= Jefferson Township, Greene County, Iowa =

Jefferson Township
- Township
- Greene County's location in Iowa
- Coordinates: 42°1′0″N 94°22′36″W
- Country: United States
- State: Iowa
- County: Greene
- Settlement: Date

Area
  - Total: 6.01 sq mi (15.57 km^{2})
  - Land: 5.97 sq mi (15.46 km^{2})
  - Water: 0.039 sq mi (0.10 km^{2})
- Elevation: 1,066 ft (325 m)

Population (2010)
  - Total: 4,345
  - Estimate (2016): 4,169
  - Density: 730/sq mi (281/km^{2})
- Time zone: UTC-6 (Central (CST))
  - Summer (DST): UTC-5 (CDT)
- ZIP code: 50129
- Area code: 515
- GNIS feature ID: 0457919
- Website: City of Jefferson

Jefferson Township is a township in Greene County, Iowa, United States.

== History ==
In 1854, Jefferson Township was established in Greene County, Iowa. It was one of three townships in Greene County at the time, along with Kendrick and Washington townships, and it encompassed the middle half of the county. It remained this way until it was split into multiple smaller townships, with the name Jefferson Township being given to the northwest corner of the survey township on which the town of Jefferson stood. The other three-quarters of a survey township was named Grant Township.

== Geography ==
Jefferson Township is one of four townships in Greene County that is not a Survey Township, along with Grant Township, Junction Township, and Washington Township. It is now defined by the city limits of the town by the same name.
