= Woodbine Elementary School =

Woodbine Elementary School may refer to:

- Woodbine Elementary School, Woodbine, Iowa, part of Woodbine Community School District
- Woodbine Elementary School, Woodbine, New Jersey, the only school of the Woodbine School District
- Woodbine Elementary School, Sacramento, California, a part of the Sacramento City Unified School District
