= Dawson Township =

Dawson Township may refer to:

== Canada ==
- Dawson, Ontario, in Rainy River District
- Dawson Township, Manitoulin District, Ontario

== United States ==
- Dawson Township, McLean County, Illinois
- Dawson Township, Greene County, Iowa
