= St. Patrick's Catholic Church, Cedar =

- St. Patrick’s Catholic Church, Cedar
- U.S. National Register of Historic Places
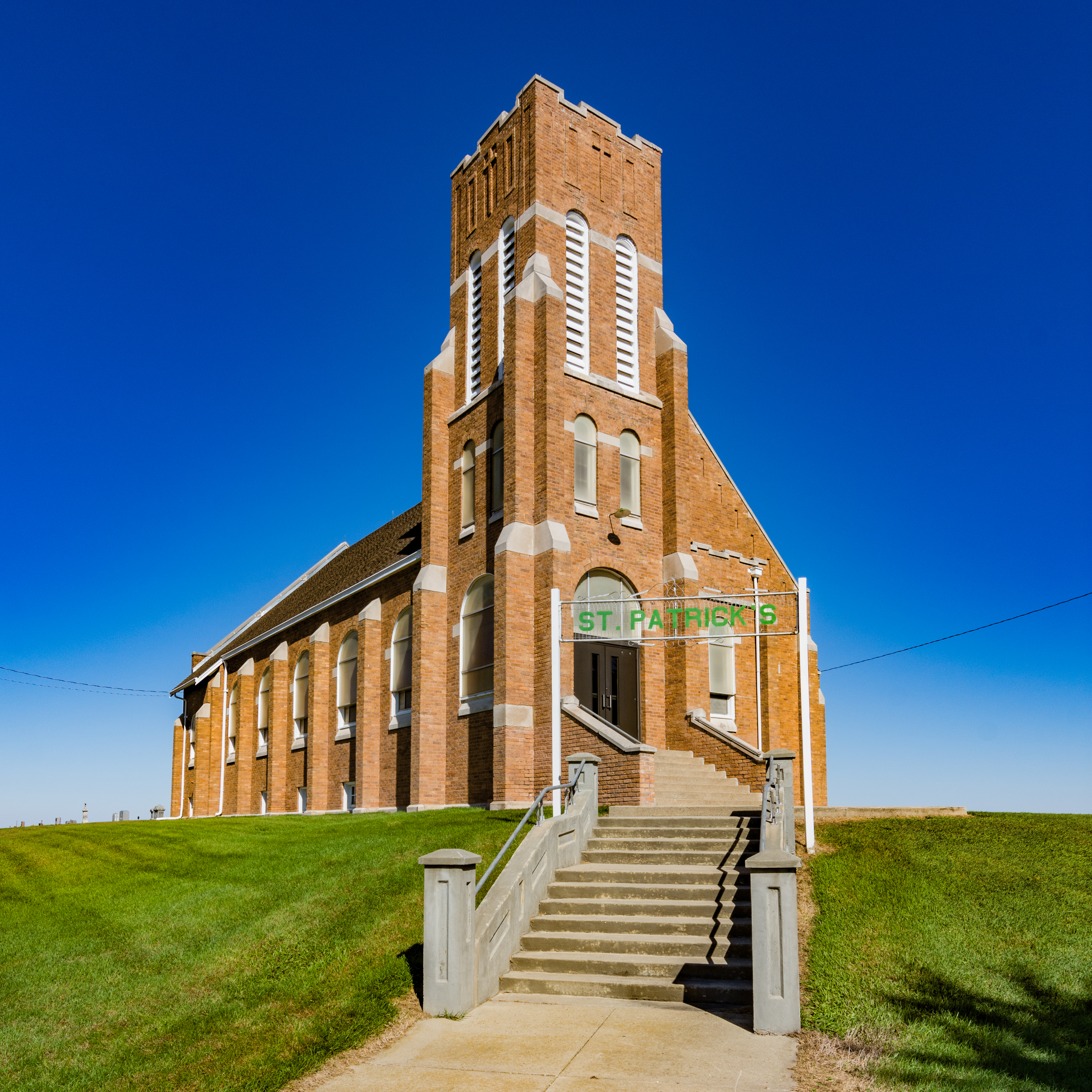

- Location within Iowa Location within the United States
- Location: 4 miles west of Churdan, Iowa on E. 19, 0.5 miles north on a gravel road
- Coordinates: 42°9′34″N 94°33′5″W
- Area: less than one acre
- Built: 1915
- Built by: C.F Mayer & Co.
- Architect: William LeBarthe Steele
- Architectural style: Romanesque
- NRHP reference No.: 92000840
- Added to NRHP: July 10, 1992

St. Patrick's Catholic Church, Cedar, also known as Cedar Catholic Church, is a historic building located west of Churdan, Iowa, United States. It is a former parish church of the Diocese of Sioux City. The church was listed on the National Register of Historic Places in 1992. It has been reduced in status to an oratory.

== History ==
The Cedar Creek area of Greene County, Iowa, was settled by Irish Catholics in the 1850s. Father Marsh from Fort Dodge said the first Mass in June 1863 in the home of Myles Fitzpatrick. Other missionary priests who served the area included Fathers Delaney, Concannon, Barry, McGrath, Mulvehill, O'Farrell, and Quirk. Fitzpatrick donated five acres of land for a church in 1872, and the lumber to build the building. It was the first Catholic church in Greene County. The white frame building with a bell tower was built by L. Isaac Ritchie. The first pastor assigned to the parish was the Rev. George Costello, who was the pastor at St. Patrick's Lohrville at the same time. Throughout its history, the parish was always a rural mission and never had a resident pastor. The parish was founded in the Diocese of Dubuque and became a parish of the Diocese of Sioux City when it was established in 1902.

The present church was built in 1915. It was designed by prominent Sioux City architect William LeBarthe Steele and built by C. F. Mayer of Humboldt at a cost of $24,000.00. The church was dedicated by Bishop Philip J. Garrigan of Sioux City, on November 7, 1915. Four years later on Sunday, June 15, 1919, the building caught fire and was reduced to a brick shell because there was nothing to battle the blaze. Because they had little money, the congregation was urged to merge with St. Columbkill's in Churdan. But they were determined to rebuild, and in the years following, the church was rebuilt using the old foundation and walls.

The Great Depression was a difficult time for the parish. It owed the American Savings Bank in Carroll $2,383.99. The church property was put into receivership on September 6, 1934. Dennis Hayes bought the property in a public sale, the note was paid on July 6, 1936, and the property was returned to the parish.

The church building started to deteriorate in the 1970s–80s and it was extensively renovated. It was placed on the National Register of Historic Places in 1992. St. Patrick's was part of the first parish cluster in the Sioux City diocese in 1988 when it was clustered with St. Columbkille's, St. John's Paton, and St. Bridget's Grand Junction. In 1995 the cluster was changed to include St. Patrick's and St. Columbkille's as before and St. Paul's Scranton. In August 1996 the parish was reduced in status to an oratory.

== Architecture ==
The Romanesque Revival style church building measures 70 by 41 feet (21 by 12 m) and was constructed of matt-faced, vitrified brick and stone. The main facade is dominated by the tall, off-set corner tower. It originally had a bell in it, but the bell was destroyed in the 1919 fire and never replaced. The tower contains the main entry into the church. The building exhibits a couple of elements from the Gothic Revival style, a steeply pitched roof and the rose window on the main facade. The side elevations are six bays in length. All of the windows have round-arched openings that are filled with stained glass. The gallery in the back of the church has a small pump organ. The interior dates from the 1920s when the church was rebuilt after the fire. The church building never had running water, so two outhouses, one of brick and one of tile and stucco, were built on the property. They are contributing buildings in the church's historic designation. A wrought-iron gate located above concrete steps near the main entrance that is labeled ST. PATRICK'S is a contributing structure. The church building's significance is attributed to its association with William Steele, and it is considered one of the best examples of Romanesque Revival style in Greene County.
