= Jackson Township, Greene County, Iowa =

Township in Greene County, Iowa, U.S.

Coordinates: 41.9903°N 94.4644°W

Jackson Township is a township in Greene County, Iowa, United States.

== History ==
Jackson Township was established in 1871. It is named for Andrew Jackson.
