= Cedar Township, Greene County, Iowa =

Township in Greene County, Iowa, U.S.

Coordinates: 42.1667°N 94.5692°W

Cedar Township is a township in Greene County, Iowa, United States.

== History ==
Cedar Township was established in 1867.
