= Willow Township, Greene County, Iowa =

Township in Greene County, Iowa, U.S.

Coordinates: 41.9069°N 94.5711°W

Willow Township is a township in Greene County, Iowa, United States.

== History ==
Willow Township was established in 1874.

== Information ==
Land area: 36.2 sq. mi. Water area: 0.0 sq. mi.

== Demographics ==
Population: 161 (all rural) Males: 81 (50.3%) Females: 80 (49.7%).
