= Lincoln Highway in Greene County, Iowa =

- The Lincoln Highway in Greene County, Iowa
- U.S. National Register of Historic Places
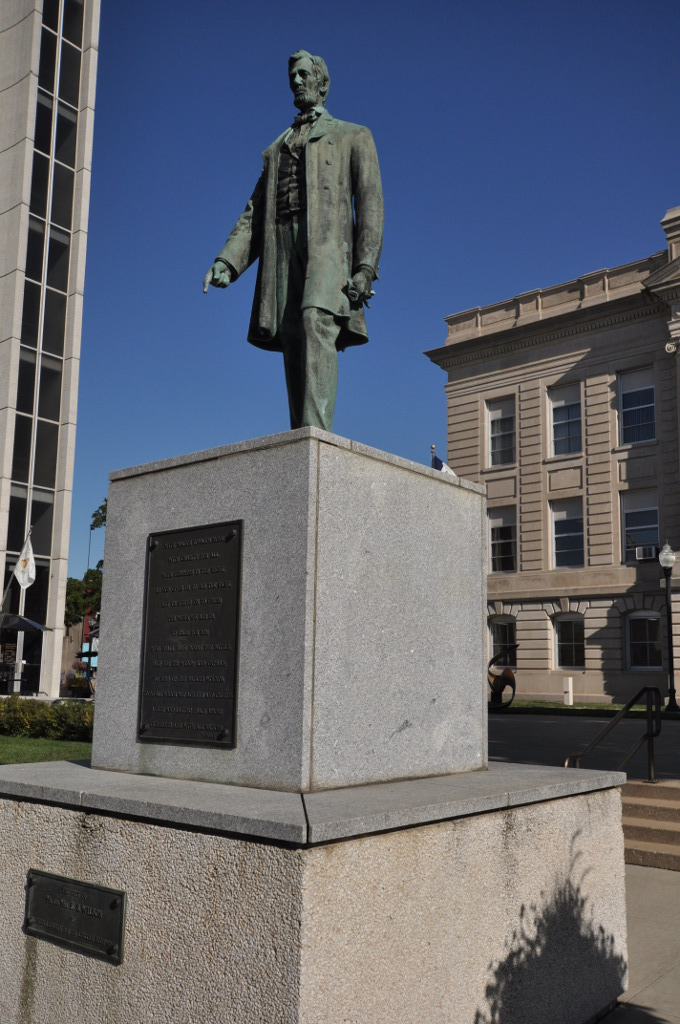
- The Lincoln statue in Jefferson.

- Location within Iowa Location within the United States
- Location: Greene County, Iowa
- Coordinates: 42°0′55″N 94°22′29″W
- MPS: The Lincoln Highway in Greene County, Iowa MPS
- NRHP reference No.: 64500168
- Added to NRHP: March 29, 1993

The Lincoln Highway in Greene County, Iowa is a multiple property submission to the National Register of Historic Places, which was approved on March 29, 1993. It includes five individual listings and five historic districts located in Greene County, Iowa, United States. They encompass abandoned sections of dirt roads, paved sections that are now part of other highways, and various sites, objects, structures and pieces of infrastructure that were a part of the Lincoln Highway. The years of historical significance are 1912 to 1928.

== The Lincoln Highway in Iowa ==
The Lincoln Highway route marker.

Carl Fisher was an American automotive and real estate entrepreneur who conceived the Lincoln Highway in 1912, and helped to develop it. Connecting New York City to San Francisco, it was the first highway to cross the United States. The intention to develop the highway was announced in 1913, and Iowans raised over $5 million for the construction of the road. There were no particularly good options to cross Iowa, but the Lincoln Highway Association wanted a direct route between Chicago and Omaha. The route through Iowa was announced on September 14, 1913. They chose what was known as the "Iowa Official Trans-Continental Route," which was already being used by transcontinental motorists through the state. It covered 358 miles (576 km) of dirt and gravel roads that began in Clinton and traveled west to Council Bluffs. Rural roads in Iowa were notorious for their poor condition, and when it rained the mud made them even worse. The chosen route paralleled the Chicago Northwestern Railroad tracks as they followed the driest and least hilly terrain in the state.

In Iowa the Lincoln Highway was also known as State Primary Road No. 6 from 1920 to 1926. Its designation changed when the federal highway system was created and it became known as U.S. 30 in 1926. The Lincoln Highway Association operated until 1927, however, the following year it put up memorial markers along the route. The old Lincoln Highway remained a major transportation artery in Iowa into the 1950s when the state constructed a new US Highway 30.

== Lincoln Highway in Greene County ==
Greene County had a history of providing good roads early in the 20th century, so much so that it was the first Iowa county to receive Rural Free Delivery (RFD) mail service. There were 20 reinforced bridges in the county in 1907, and by 1909 it had 175 miles (282 km) of gravel roads. The year the Lincoln Highway route was announced, the Greene County Board of Supervisors established an official county road system that connected all the towns in the county. The citizens of the county worked to raise funds to promote and improve the Lincoln Highway through their territory. The Board of Supervisors spent $15,000 to improve the roadway in 1914, and the citizens raised another $5,000. A statue of Abraham Lincoln, a gift from E.B. and Minnie Wilson, was placed on the courthouse square in 1918 to commemorate the highway. The county was the first to accept Federal funds for paving roads in 1919. While the "seedling mile" outside of Marion was the first section of the Lincoln Highway that was paved in the state, Greene County was the first county to pave their portion of the highway. The first paved portion was a 6.5-mile (10.5 km) section equidistant from the center of Jefferson. All 30 miles (48 km) in the county were paved by 1924. The route through Greene County was changed several times between 1913 and 1924. This was done as highway design and engineering standards evolved so that curves were straightened, hills were graded, and rail crossings were avoided.

== Individual listings ==
=== Lincoln Highway Markers ===
The Lincoln Highway Markers are 48.5-inch (1.23 m) high concrete structures. They are composed of a 28-inch (71 cm) octagon shaped post and a rectangular top that are cast in one piece. A nearly 4-inch (10 cm) medallion of Abraham Lincoln is embedded in the front side of the rectangular top. It is inscribed with: "This highway dedicated to Abraham Lincoln." Below the medallion an "L" and a direction arrow are stamped into the concrete. The markers were the last official signs used to designate the highway right of way. About 3,000 of them were cast. They were placed in designated spots about 1 mile (1.6 km) apart by local Boy Scout troops in 1928.

Six markers are known to exist in Greene County. Five are located along the highway and one is broken and is located in the Greene County Museum. Two of the markers are individually listed on the National Register of Historic Places. Lincoln Highway Marker (2) is located near the Lincoln Statue on the grounds of the Greene County Courthouse in Jefferson. Given its location along the highway and next to the Lincoln statue it is possible that this marker was installed here in 1928, but that cannot be determined definitively. In 2011 this marker was included as a contributing property in the Jefferson Square Commercial Historic District. Lincoln Highway Marker (1) is also in Jefferson in an address restricted location.

=== Buttrick's Creek Abandoned Segment ===
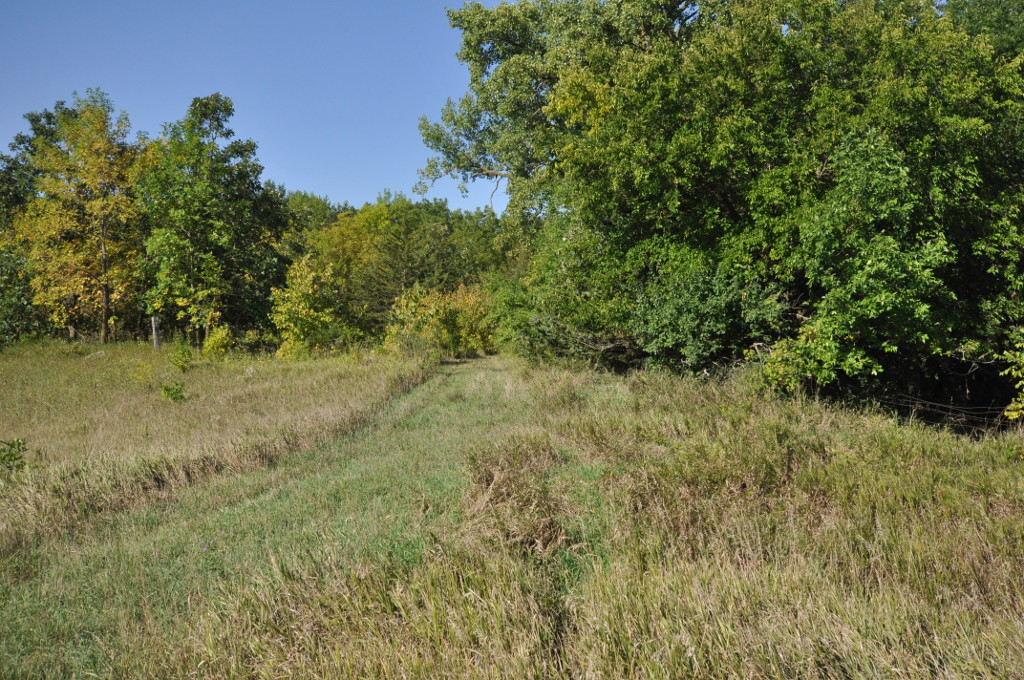
Abandoned section of the highway.

This 600-by-66-foot (183 by 20 m) section of abandoned roadway was part of the original Lincoln Highway route. It was abandoned when a curve was straightened in 1920. This section was a part of the roadway that went past the farmstead of Capt. Albert Head, an early promoter of the highway who made significant monetary contributions to its development. Head also contributed toward the construction of a nearby bridge, no longer extant. While the bridge's construction in 1914 straightened part of the roadway, motorists still had to negotiate a tight curve immediately south of the bridge. The realignment removed this curve, but kept the roadway close to the farmsteads.

The abandoned section lays perpendicular to the west from County Road E53. It is located on a grass incline, and the old grade and cut banks are clearly visible. The old roadway is no longer used for any purpose, and the grade and cut banks are covered with mowed grass. A partially buried concrete headwall of a driveway culvert is located at the top of the incline. Its design and materials are consistent with other culverts along the old highway.

=== Little Beaver Creek Bridge ===
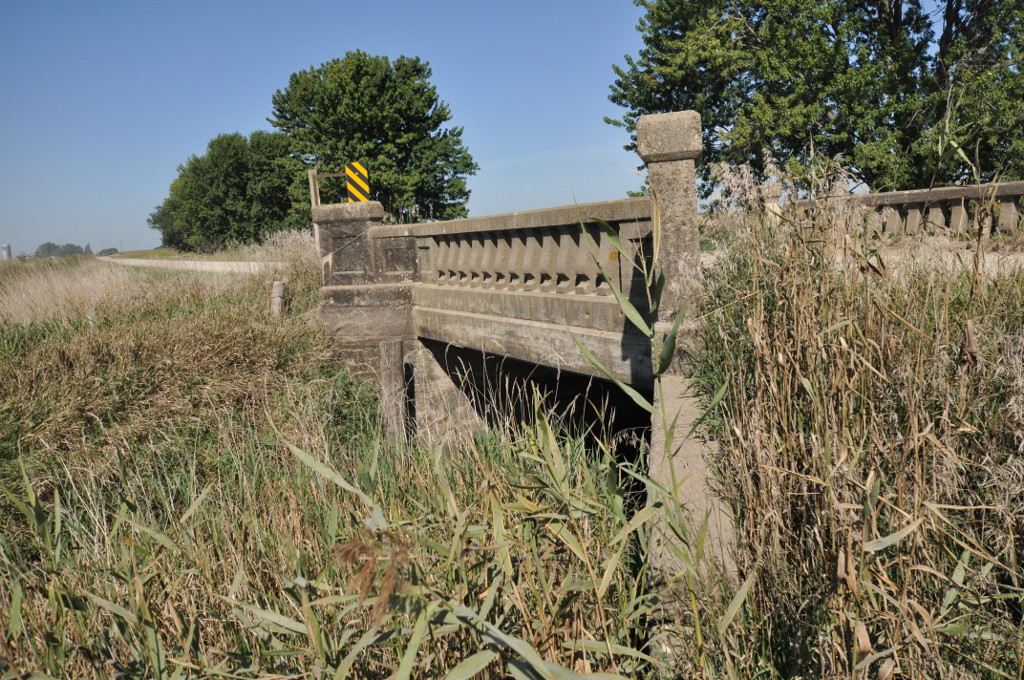
Little Beaver Creek Bridge

The bridge over Little Beaver Creek is a reinforced concrete deck structure with concrete baluster guardrails built in 1915. It carries the traffic of a gravel rural road over the creek. The road served as part of the Lincoln Highway between 1914 and 1922. Originally, the highway was designated to be a mile south along the Chicago Northwestern tracks, but the Greene and Boone County segments would not align. Greene County moved its route to the north so the two segments would meet at the county line. In 1920 a sizable contingent of residents from Grand Junction petitioned to have the route shifted back to the south. Both county Boards of Supervisors agreed to route the highway south of the railroad tracks, which necessitated a new stretch of highway to be built. It was completed in 1922, and the Greene County Board of Supervisors returned this bridge and the road it serves to the township road system on October 23.

=== Lincoln Statue ===
This statue of Abraham Lincoln is a replica of W. Granville Hastings’ statue in Cincinnati, Ohio. It was a gift of E.B. and Minnie Wilson. Dedicated on September 22, 1918, it was the first statue of Lincoln built beside, and dedicated to, the Lincoln Highway.

== Historic districts ==
=== Buttrick's Creek to Grand Junction Segment ===
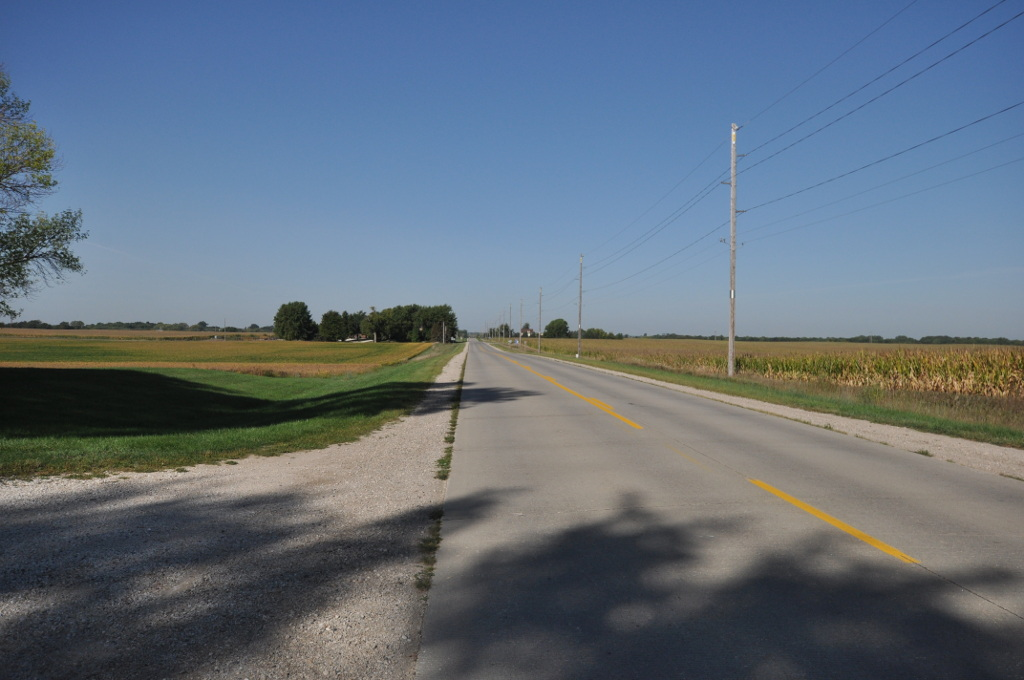
County Road E53, formerly part of the Lincoln Highway

This is an original section of the old Lincoln Highway from 1913, and it is now part of County Road E53. It runs across 2.4 miles (3.9 km) of relatively level farm land from a curve east of Buttrick's Creek to Iowa Highway 144 just south of Grand Junction. At one time the junction with Iowa 144 was a Y-intersection that has subsequently been converted into a T intersection. The Lincoln Highway through Iowa had many Y-intersections, and they have likewise been converted. A jog in the road was straightened in 1920, and this whole stretch of highway was paved with concrete in 1924 by Empire Construction Company of Des Moines. There are six contributing resources to this historic district, all structures: the roadway itself, the road drainage system, and four culverts. Construction plans from 1923 show that the culverts and half of the drainage system were in place when the highway was paved. The roadway is 18 feet (5.5 m) across, and within a 66-foot (20 m) right-of-way. The drainage system includes two lines of 6-inch (150 mm) drainage tiles and 12 intakes. Each intake is a conical-shaped cast iron grate that covers a subsurface concrete cylinder. The four culverts include one concrete driveway culvert and three concrete box culverts, all of different sizes.

=== Grand Junction Segment ===
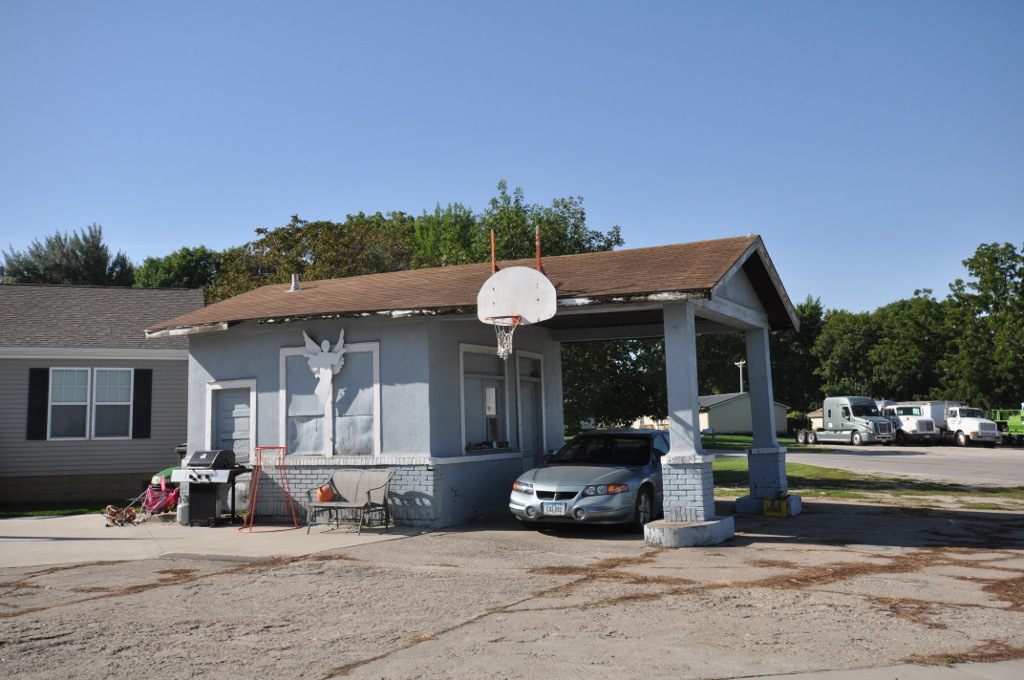
Former gas station in Grand Junction along the old Lincoln Highway route.

Most of this 1.75-mile (2.82 km) section of the Lincoln Highway was not on the original route from 1913, but was part of the negotiations with Boone County to re-route the highway south of the Chicago Northwestern tracks in 1920. The new alignment required a new roadway to be built, and it eliminated all railroad crossings on this part of the highway. It was completed in 1922. The western section of the roadway is in the town of Grand Junction, and it was paved in 1923. The rural section on the east side was paved the following year. Empire Construction completed both projects. Like the segment in the historic district above, it is now a part of County Road E53. The town section passes through the central business district on the west and a residential area on the east. The rural section passes along the railroad tracks and under the US 30 overpass before it connects with the newer highway. There are six contributing resources to this historic district, five structures and one object. The structures are the 0.75-mile (1.21 km) section of urban roadway, the 1 mile (1.6 km) section of rural roadway, the West Beaver Creek Bridge, one culvert and the road drainage system. The object is a Lincoln Highway Marker that stands in front of the Grand Junction city hall. The West Beaver Creek Bridge is a 24-by-24-foot (7.3 by 7.3 m) concrete slab bridge with closed guardrails. It is located outside of town on the rural section of roadway. Christenson Construction Company built the structure for $3,440.

=== Raccoon River Rural Segment ===
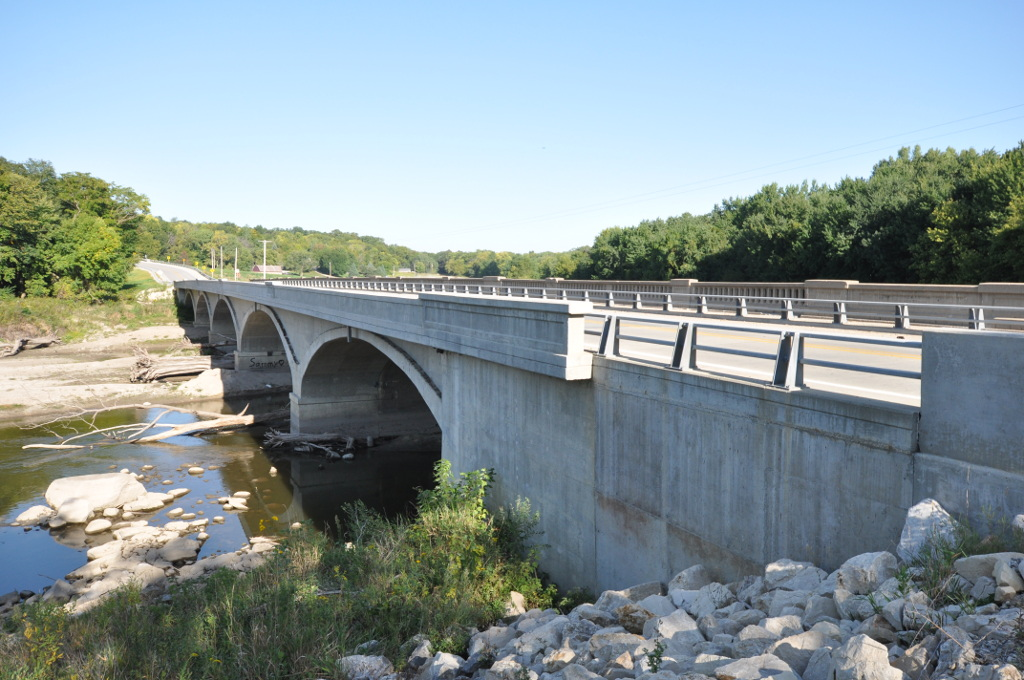
Eureka Bridge

This is another original section of the old Lincoln Highway from 1913 that is now part of County Road E53. It runs through 3.6 miles (5.8 km) of rolling farmland, and through the Raccoon River Valley. There are 11 contributing resources to this historic district, 10 structures and one site. The roadway is one structure broken into three segments. The first segment is a 1.4-mile (2.3 km) section on the west side of the district. It was paved in 1924 by Empire Construction. The second segment is a 1.3-mile (2.1 km) section on the east and west sides of the Eureka Bridge. It includes Danger Hill where the grade was reduced considerably in 1920 and a jog in the highway was replaced with a curve. The C.C. Barnes Company completed the work. Empire Construction also paved this section in 1924. The third segment is a 0.9-mile (1.4 km) section on the east side of the district. It was one of the first sections of the Lincoln Highway paved in Greene County in 1920. The work was completed by F.E. Marsh Company of Jefferson, Iowa. The Eureka Bridge is a five-span reinforced concrete arch bridge. Each span is 77 feet (23 m) wide with an overall length of 422 feet (129 m). It replaced an earlier span that was partially washed out by a flood in 1912. Marsh Engineering Company of Des Moines constructed the bridge that was designed by the Iowa Highway Commission. It is one of the earliest arch bridges still standing in Iowa, and one of the first designed by the state highway commission. Because of increased traffic on the span it had to be widened in 1924. Other historic structures include the road drainage system, six culverts, and one cattle pass. The site is 600 feet (180 m) of abandoned roadway at the top of Danger Hill. This section of roadway appears not to have been paved, and it includes one of the culverts.

=== West Beaver Creek Abandoned Segment ===
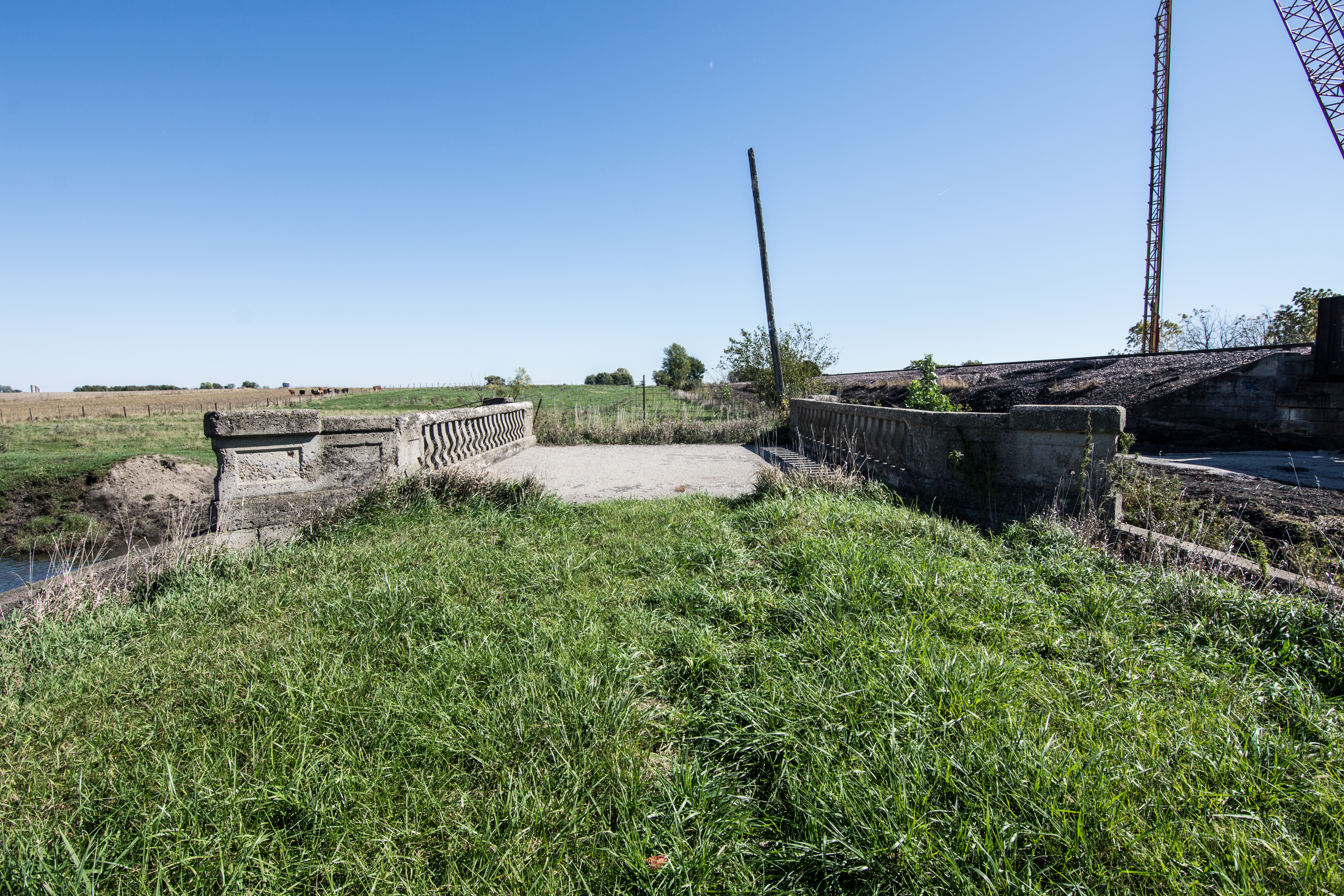
Bridge on the West Beaver Creek Abandoned Segment

This abandoned section of roadway was part of the original Lincoln Highway from 1913. It lies to the north of the Chicago Northwestern tracks which are immediately to the north of the Grand Junction Segment (see above). The Lincoln Highway route was moved north in eastern Greene County in 1914 so the Greene and Boone County segments of the highway would connect. The realignment also removed a couple of dangerous railroad crossings at the same time. This section of roadway survived that realignment, and remained part of the highway until 1922 when the right-of-way was shifted south of the railroad tracks and a new roadway was built. This realignment removed another railroad crossing at Grand Junction. There are three contributing resources to this historic district, two structures and one site. One of the structures is a 18-by-24-foot (5.5 by 7.3 m) concrete bridge that features concrete balustered guardrails. It was built by the Iowa Bridge Company in 1915 for $1,339. It replaced an older wooden span. A partially buried concrete driveway culvert is the other structure, and a 0.1-mile (0.16 km) section of the abandoned dirt roadway is the site. The roadway was never paved. The historic district is located on a farm and the former roadway and bridge are still used to move farm machinery.

=== West Greene County Rural Segment ===
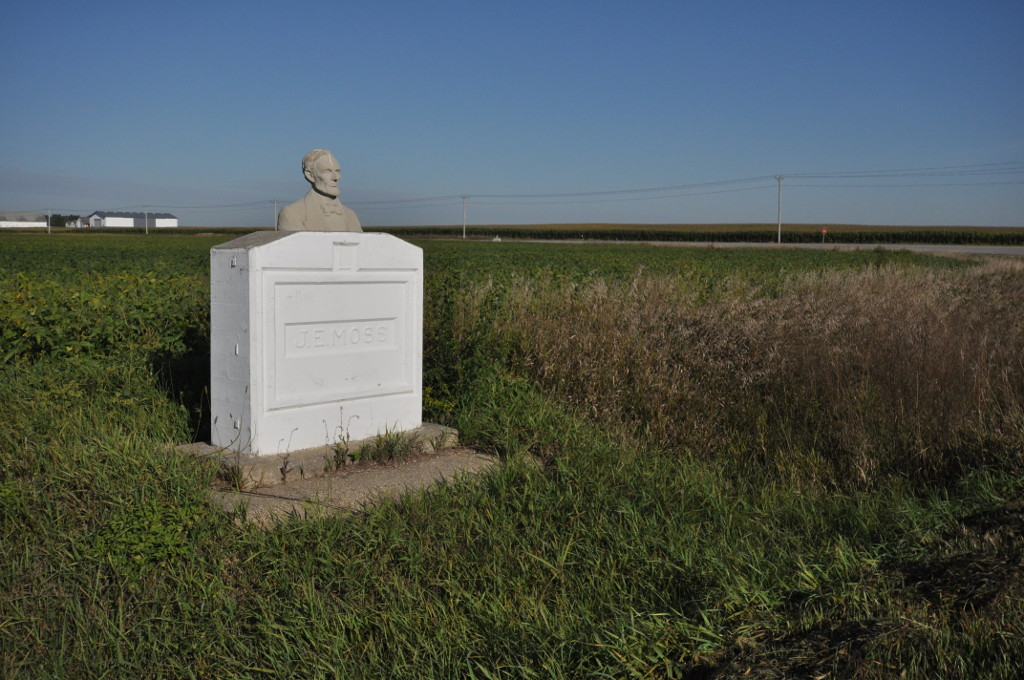
One of the property markers on the West Greene County Rural Segment.

This is yet another original section of the old Lincoln Highway from 1913. The east–west section of roadway is now part of County Road E39, and the north–south section of the roadway is part of Iowa Highway 25. The highways are located on relatively level farmland. There are 13 contributing resources to this historic district, 11 structures and two objects. The structures include the 4.35 miles (7.00 km) of roadway, the road drainage system, eight culverts, and a skew I-beam bridge. Empire Construction paved this section of the Lincoln Highway in 1924. Part of the paving project included the construction of a new bridge. The I-beam structure was completed by C.J. Kramme of Fort Dodge, Iowa for $5,413. It replaced an earlier wooden span. The objects are two property markers located on private property where the road turns south from County Road E39 onto Iowa 25. They were placed here by James E. Moss, who farmed the land and was an ardent supporter of the Lincoln Highway. Moss was a Civil War veteran who lost a foot at Missionary Ridge. He had these identical markers erected in 1926 as memorials to Abraham Lincoln, whom he considered "one of our greatest citizens." They are concrete structures created by Harold Carlisle of Jefferson, and are capped by a concrete bust of Abraham Lincoln. The original busts were broken off and have been replaced. An "L" is stamped on the shoulder of the base, and "J.E. Moss" stamped on front. Similar markers were to be erected at several other points in Greene County, but there is no evidence that they ever were.
