= Highland Township, Greene County, Iowa =

Township in Greene County, Iowa, U.S.

Coordinates: 42.1625°N 94.4456°W

Highland Township is a township in Greene County, Iowa, United States.

== History ==
Highland Township was established in 1872.
