= Joice, Iowa =

- City
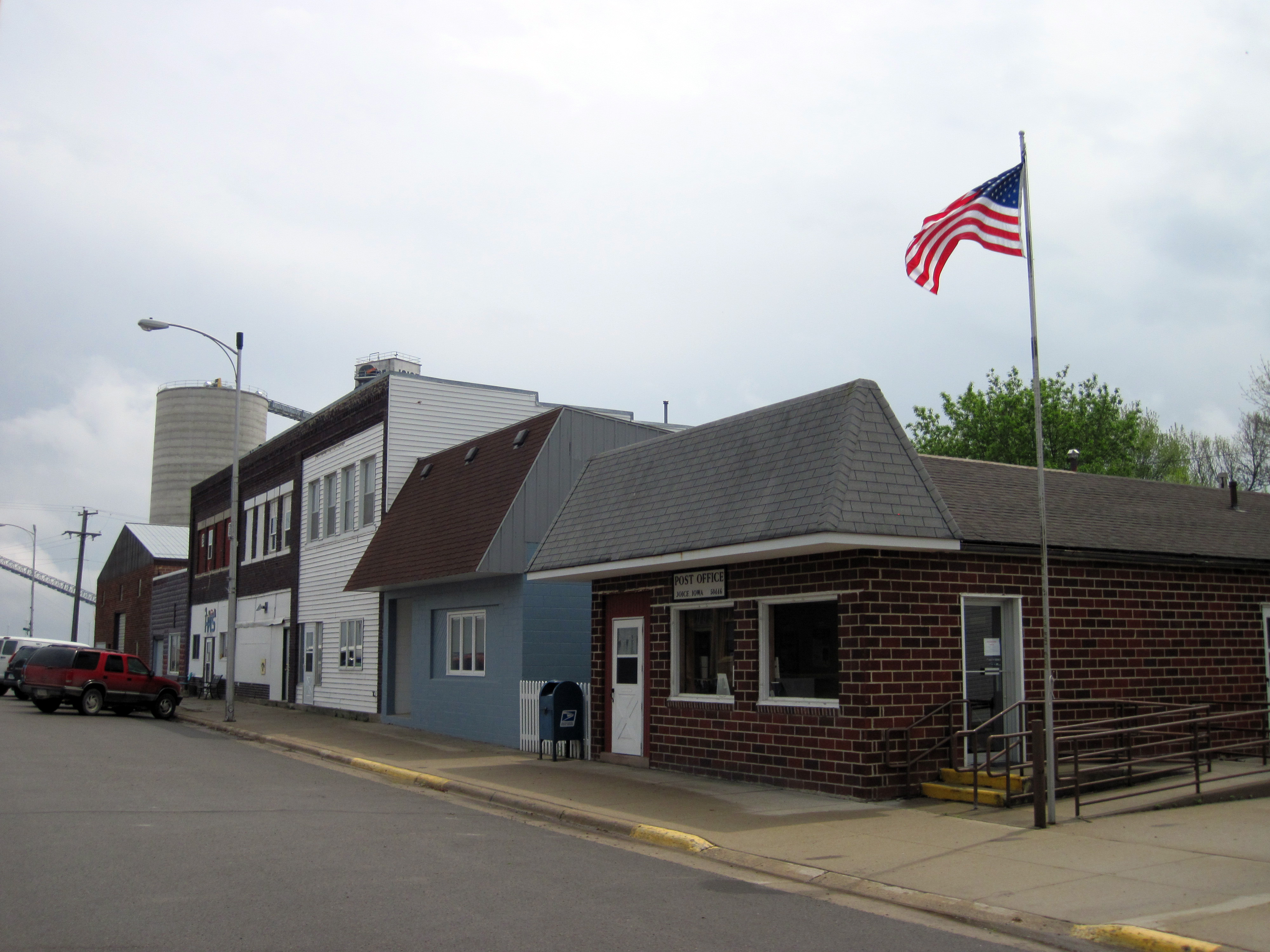
- Joice post office and stores

- Location of Joice, Iowa
- Coordinates: 43°21′51″N 93°27′26″W
- Country: USA
- State: Iowa
- County: Worth

Area
  - Total: 1.07 sq mi (2.77 km^{2})
  - Land: 1.07 sq mi (2.77 km^{2})
  - Water: 0 sq mi (0.00 km^{2})
- Elevation: 1,260 ft (380 m)

Population (2020)
  - Total: 208
  - Density: 194.7/sq mi (75.16/km^{2})
- Time zone: UTC-6 (Central (CST))
  - Summer (DST): UTC-5 (CDT)
- ZIP code: 50446
- Area code: 641
- FIPS code: 19-39855
- GNIS feature ID: 2395476

Joice is a city in Worth County, Iowa, United States. The population was 208 at the time of the 2020 census. It is part of the Mason City Micropolitan Statistical Area and is typically considered a part of Bristol Township.

== History ==
Joice got its start, following the construction of the Chicago and North Western Railway through that territory. A post office called Joice has been in operation since 1900. Joice was incorporated as a city in 1913. The city was named for R. M. Joice, a local banker. On the 21st night of September 2018, a fire took the Joice Public Library due to faulty wiring, causing the eventual construction of a new public library.

== Geography ==
According to the United States Census Bureau, the city has a total area of 1.00 square mile (2.59 km^{2}), all land.

== Demographics ==
Historical populations
| Year | Pop. | ±% |
|---|---|---|
| 1920 | 233 | — |
| 1930 | 225 | −3.4% |
| 1940 | 263 | +16.9% |
| 1950 | 244 | −7.2% |
| 1960 | 231 | −5.3% |
| 1970 | 201 | −13.0% |
| 1980 | 223 | +10.9% |
| 1990 | 245 | +9.9% |
| 2000 | 231 | −5.7% |
| 2010 | 222 | −3.9% |
| 2020 | 208 | −6.3% |
Source:"U.S. Census website". United States Census Bureau. and Iowa Data Center; Source: U.S. Decennial Census

=== 2020 census ===
As of the census of 2020, there were 208 people, 80 households, and 53 families residing in the city. The population density was 194.7 inhabitants per square mile (75.2/km^{2}). There were 99 housing units at an average density of 92.7 per square mile (35.8/km^{2}). The racial makeup of the city was 91.8% White, 1.0% Black or African American, 0.0% Native American, 0.5% Asian, 0.0% Pacific Islander, 1.0% from other races and 5.8% from two or more races. Hispanic or Latino persons of any race comprised 9.1% of the population.

Of the 80 households, 31.2% of which had children under the age of 18 living with them, 45.0% were married couples living together, 12.5% were cohabitating couples, 23.8% had a female householder with no spouse or partner present and 18.8% had a male householder with no spouse or partner present. 33.8% of all households were non-families. 31.2% of all households were made up of individuals, 13.8% had someone living alone who was 65 years old or older.

The median age in the city was 43.5 years. 27.9% of the residents were under the age of 20; 4.3% were between the ages of 20 and 24; 20.2% were from 25 and 44; 30.3% were from 45 and 64; and 17.3% were 65 years of age or older. The gender makeup of the city was 51.9% male and 48.1% female.

=== 2010 census ===
At the 2010 census there were 222 people in 99 households, including 61 families, in the city. The population density was 222.0 inhabitants per square mile (85.7/km^{2}). There were 106 housing units at an average density of 106.0 per square mile (40.9/km^{2}). The racial makup of the city was 96.8% White, 0.5% Native American, and 2.7% from two or more races.

Of the 99 households 34.3% had children under the age of 18 living with them, 43.4% were married couples living together, 13.1% had a female householder with no husband present, 5.1% had a male householder with no wife present, and 38.4% were non-families. 34.3% of households were one person and 9.1% were one person aged 65 or older. The average household size was 2.24 and the average family size was 2.77.

The median age was 39.9 years. 26.1% of residents were under the age of 18; 6.8% were between the ages of 18 and 24; 25.4% were from 25 to 44; 28.4% were from 45 to 64; and 13.5% were 65 or older. The gender makeup of the city was 50.5% male and 49.5% female.

=== 2000 census ===
At the 2000 census there were 231 people in 101 households, including 66 families, in the city. The population density was 230.5 inhabitants per square mile (89.0/km^{2}). There were 109 housing units at an average density of 108.7 per square mile (42.0/km^{2}). The racial makup of the city was 98.70% White, 1.30% from other races. Hispanic or Latino of any race were 1.30%.

Of the 101 households 33.7% had children under the age of 18 living with them, 49.5% were married couples living together, 9.9% had a female householder with no husband present, and 33.7% were non-families. 31.7% of households were one person and 12.9% were one person aged 65 or older. The average household size was 2.29 and the average family size was 2.84.

The age distribution was 26.4% under the age of 18, 10.4% from 18 to 24, 28.6% from 25 to 44, 22.9% from 45 to 64, and 11.7% 65 or older. The median age was 34 years. For every 100 females, there were 97.4 males. For every 100 females age 18 and over, there were 97.7 males.

The median household income was $39,375 and the median family income was $48,250. Males had a median income of $32,500 versus $22,917 for females. The per capita income for the city was $17,530. About 7.9% of families and 13.0% of the population were below the poverty line, including 20.8% of those under the age of eighteen and none of those sixty five or over.

== Education ==
The Lake Mills Community School District operates local public schools.
