= Franklin Township, Greene County, Iowa =

Township in Greene County, Iowa, U.S.

Coordinates: 41.9067°N 94.3383°W

Franklin Township is a township in Greene County, Iowa, United States.

== History ==
Franklin Township was established in 1870. It is not named after Benjamin Franklin but rather one of the first families to settle in the county. The township originally consisted of mostly low wetlands that have since been reclaimed through drainage, giving it some of the most choice farmland in the corn belt.
