= Paton-Churdan Community School District =

Public school district in Churdan, Iowa, United States

Location
- 606 Adrian Street; Churdan, Iowa 50050 Greene County United States

District information
- Type: Public school district
- Grades: PK to 12
- Established: 1962
- Superintendent: Kreg Lensch
- Budget: $3,697,000 (2020-21)
- NCES District ID: 1922380

Students and staff
- Students: 188 (2022-23)
- Teachers: 17.13 FTE
- Staff: 19.88 FTE
- Student–teacher ratio: 10.97
- Athletic conference: Rolling Hills
- District mascot: Rockets
- Colors: Orange and Black

Other information
- Website: www.paton-churdan.k12.ia.us

The Paton-Churdan Community School District is a rural public school district headquartered in Churdan, Iowa. The district is in Greene County and serves Churdan and Paton.

Paton-Churdan has roughly 188 students in grades K to 12 taught in one building in Churdan.

The Rockets is the team name, and there is a statue of a rocket in the front lawn.

== Paton-Churdan Elementary School ==
The elementary school serves about 70 students in grades Pre-K to 5.

== Paton-Churdan Junior-Senior High School ==
The high school serves about 80 students in grades 6 to 12.

The Class of 2005 graduated with 8 students. There were four men and four women, thus they were the homecoming court.

Currently, Paton-Churdan high school students attend classes at Greene County High School (formerly Jefferson-Scranton High School) of the Greene County Community School District for about half of the day.

== Paton-Churdan High School ==
=== Athletics ===
The Rockets compete in the Rolling Valley Conference in the following sports:

- Baseball
- Basketball (boys and girls)
- Cross Country (boys and girls)
- Football
  - 2-time Class A State Champions (1985, 1986)
- Softball
- Track and Field (boys and girls)
  - Boys' - 1986 Class 1A State Champions
- Volleyball
- Wrestling

== See also ==
- List of school districts in Iowa
- List of high schools in Iowa
