= Washington Township, Greene County, Iowa =

Washington township
- Township
- Location of Washington Township in Greene County.
- Coordinates: 41.54°N 94.10°W
- Country: United States
- State: Iowa
- Counties: Greene County

Area
  - Total: 47.6 sq mi (123 km^{2})

Population (2020)
  - Total: 417

Washington Township is a township in Greene County, Iowa, United States. It had a population of 417 people in 2020

== History ==
Washington Township was established in 1854. Washington Township was one of the first townships in Greene County at that time, along with Jefferson and Kendrick townships and others.

== Demographics ==
=== 2023 Census ===
Washington Township had an employment rate of 76.5%. There were also 180 households with a median household income of $85,357, a 13.6% Education rate, and an 8.6% healthcare rate.

=== 2020 Census ===
Washington Township had a population of 417 and 217 Total housing units.

== Geography ==
Washington Township is 47.6 square miles large and has 10.1 people per square mile.

== See also ==
- Greene County, Iowa
- Rippey, Iowa
