= Farlin, Iowa =

Unincorporated community in Iowa

- unincorporated community
- Location within Iowa Location within the United States
- Country: United States
- State: Iowa
- County: Greene County
- Elevation: 1,073 ft (327 m)
- Time zone: UTC-6 (Central (CST))
  - Summer (DST): UTC-5 (CDT)

Farlin is an unincorporated community in Greene County, Iowa, United States.

== History ==
Farlin was founded in the 1880s. Farlin is the name of one Mr. McFarlin, an early prominent grain buyer. Farlin's population was 45 in 1902. The population was 75 in 1940.
