= Hardin Township, Greene County, Iowa =

Township in Greene County, Iowa, U.S.

Coordinates: 42.0811°N 94.3292°W

Hardin Township is a township in Greene County, Iowa, United States.

== History ==
Hardin Township was established in 1869. Hardin is the name of an early settler.
