= Coon Rapids–Bayard Community School District =

Public school district in Coon Rapids, Iowa, United States

Coordinates: 41.878336°N 94.681689°W

Location
- Coon Rapids, Iowa Carroll, Guthrie, Greene, and Audubon counties United States
- Coordinates: 41.878336, -94.681689

District information
- Type: Local school district
- Grades: K–12
- Established: 1988
- Superintendent: Eric Trager
- Schools: 2
- Budget: $7,239,000 (2020-21)
- NCES District ID: 1908070

Students and staff
- Students: 435 (2022-23)
- Teachers: 36.31 FTE
- Staff: 36.71 FTE
- Student–teacher ratio: 12.01
- Athletic conference: Rolling Valley
- District mascot: Crusaders
- Colors: Red and Black

Other information
- Website: www.crbcrusaders.org

Coon Rapids–Bayard Community School District is a rural public school district headquartered in Coon Rapids, Iowa.

The district serves Coon Rapids and Bayard. Portions of the district are in Carroll, Guthrie, Greene, and Audubon counties.

The district was established on July 1, 1988, by the merger of the Bayard and Coon Rapids school districts.

== Schools ==
- Coon Rapids–Bayard Elementary School
- Coon Rapids–Bayard Secondary School

== Coon Rapids–Bayard Secondary School ==
=== Athletics ===
The Crusaders compete in the Rolling Valley Conference in the following sports:

- Baseball
- Basketball (boys and girls)
- Cross country (boys and girls)
- Football
- Softball
- Track and field (boys and girls)
- Volleyball
- Wrestling

== See also ==
- List of school districts in Iowa
- List of high schools in Iowa
