= Scranton Township, Greene County, Iowa =

Township in Greene County, Iowa, U.S.

Coordinates: 41.9789°N 94.5808°W

Scranton Township is a township in Greene County, Iowa, United States.

== History ==
Scranton Township was established in 1870.
