= Statue of Abraham Lincoln (Jefferson, Iowa) =

- Lincoln Statue
- U.S. National Register of Historic Places
- U.S. Historic district – Contributing property
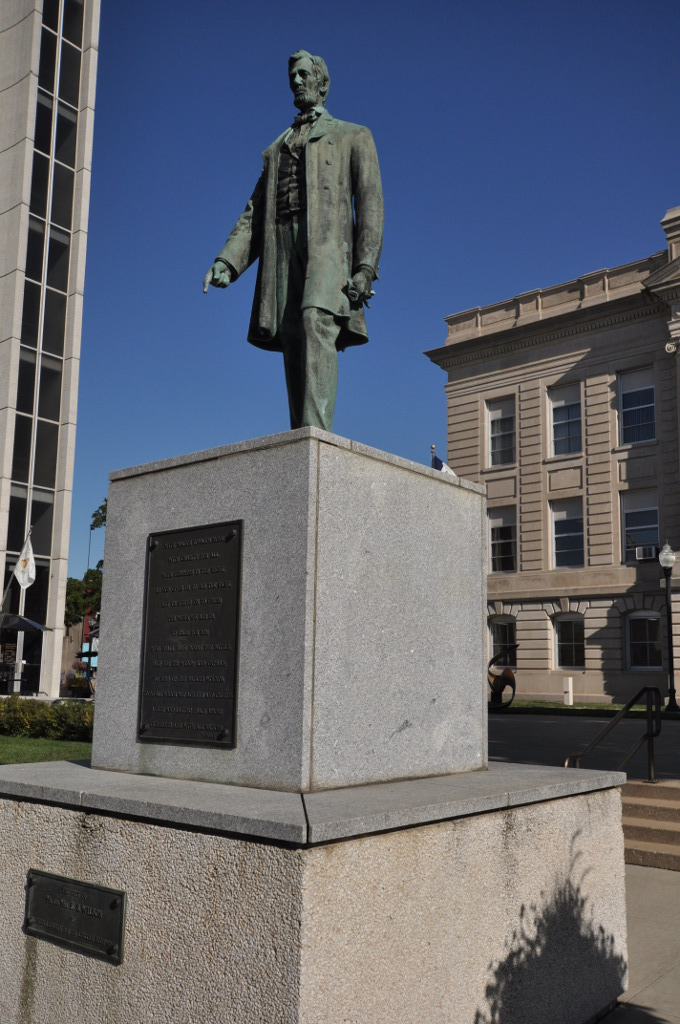

- Location within Iowa Location within the United States
- Location: Junction of Lincoln Way and Chestnut St. Jefferson, Iowa
- Coordinates: 42°0′55.5″N 94°22′26.75″W
- Area: less than one acre
- Built: 1918
- Built by: Bureau Brothers Foundry
- Architect: W. Granville Hastings
- Part of: Jefferson Square Commercial Historic District (ID11000503)
- MPS: The Lincoln Highway in Greene County, Iowa MPS
- NRHP reference No.: 93000165
- Added to NRHP: March 29, 1993

The Lincoln Statue is an historic structure located on the grounds of the Greene County Courthouse in Jefferson, Iowa, United States. It was erected in 1918, and individually listed on the National Register of Historic Places in 1993. In 2011 it was included as a contributing property in the Jefferson Square Commercial Historic District.

== History ==
This was the first statue of Abraham Lincoln built beside, and dedicated to, the Lincoln Highway. The statue is a replica of W. Granville Hastings' statue in Cincinnati, Ohio, and was a gift of Mr. and Mrs. E.B. Wilson. The bronze statue is life size, and it stands on a two-tiered concrete base. The lower base features a pebblestone finish, and the upper portion is faced with 2 inches (5.1 cm) of granite. A bronze plaque with the closing paragraph of Lincoln's second inaugural address is affixed to the upper portion of the base.

The Wilsons decided to donate the statue when the present courthouse was completed in 1917. Because they had no children they reasoned they should give something substantial to the community. The Greene County Board of Supervisors agreed to pay half the cost of the base. The Bureau Brothers Foundry of Philadelphia was contracted to create the statue, and they included the plaque at no expense. It was originally planned that the statue would stand atop a base of pink granite from Pipestone, Minnesota. However, because of World War I the War Industries Board, refused to permit the quarrying and carving the stone until the war was over. The Capitol Hill Monument Company of Des Moines erected a temporary concrete base for the statue's dedication on September 22, 1918. The "temporary" base was replaced in 1964. The Iowa State Highway Commission Service Bulletin and the Lincoln Highway Forum used a photograph of the new statue on the cover of their publications in 1918. The Lincoln Highway placed an image of the statue on its mission statement in 1920.

== See also ==
- List of statues of Abraham Lincoln
- Lincoln Highway in Greene County, Iowa
- List of sculptures of presidents of the United States
