= Paton Township, Greene County, Iowa =

Township in Greene County, Iowa, U.S.

Coordinates: 42.1733°N 94.2039°W

Paton Township is a township in Greene County, Iowa, United States.

== History ==
Paton Township was established in 1875.
