= Grand View Christian School =

Private school in Iowa, United States

Location
- Des Moines, Iowa; United States
- 41.6436°N 93.5597°W

Information
- Type: Private Christian
- Opened: 2014
- Superintendent: Mr. Chris Murphy
- Principal: Mr. Jonathan Nilius (HS), Mr. Aaron Pals (Elementary), Mr. Matt Parmelee (MS)
- Grades: preschool 3-12th grade
- Enrollment: 865 (2023-2024)
- Colors: Green, Black, White, Yellow
- Athletics conference: Bluegrass
- Mascot: Thunder
- Newspaper: The Thunder Times
- Website: grandviewchristianschool.org

Grand View Christian School is a private Christian school located in Des Moines, Iowa. Enrollment for the school is at 530 in preschool-12th grade. The high school has about 128 high school students.

== Founding ==
The school began following the closure of Grandview Park Baptist School, affiliated with Grandview Park Baptist Church, in spring 2014. The objective of the founding group was to open a reorganized school under new administration and leadership for the academic year, beginning August 18, 2014, while maintaining and expanding the school's Christian heritage and its programmatic and academic standing. A direction, mission, and vision were set, a new 501(c)(3) non-profit organization formed, a board of directors appointed, faculty and staff secured, student recruitment and fundraising initiatives employed, and a physical plant (e.g. facilities, furnishings, technology, remodeling, curriculum) was purchased and made functional. On August 18, 2014, GVCS opened with full state accreditation in the elementary divisions and with College Preparatory Status state accreditation in the high school division. Alumni of Grandview Park Baptist School are considered part of the GVCS alumni. In 2014, GVCS was given all Grandview Park Baptist School's student records, including student transcripts and other records in accordance with Iowa law.

The group purchased Norwoodville Elementary School, formerly an elementary public school in the Saydel School District, located in Norwoodville, an unincorporated community just north of Des Moines.

GVCS offers an international student program, sports and fine art programs, a servant leadership philosophical framework, dual high school and college credit programs, and other opportunities for students.

== Athletics ==
- 2017, 2018 and 2018 Boys Basketball 1A State Champions
- 2026 Softball State 2A Champions
