= Bristol Township, Worth County, Iowa =

Township in Worth County, Iowa, U.S.

Coordinates: 43.3792°N 93.4383°W

Bristol Township is a township in Worth County, Iowa, United States. At the 2000 census, the population was 513. Included in the township is Joice, which had a population of 208 at the 2020 census.

== History ==
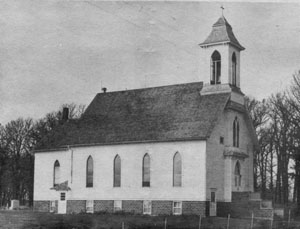
The now-torn down Bristol Lutheran Church

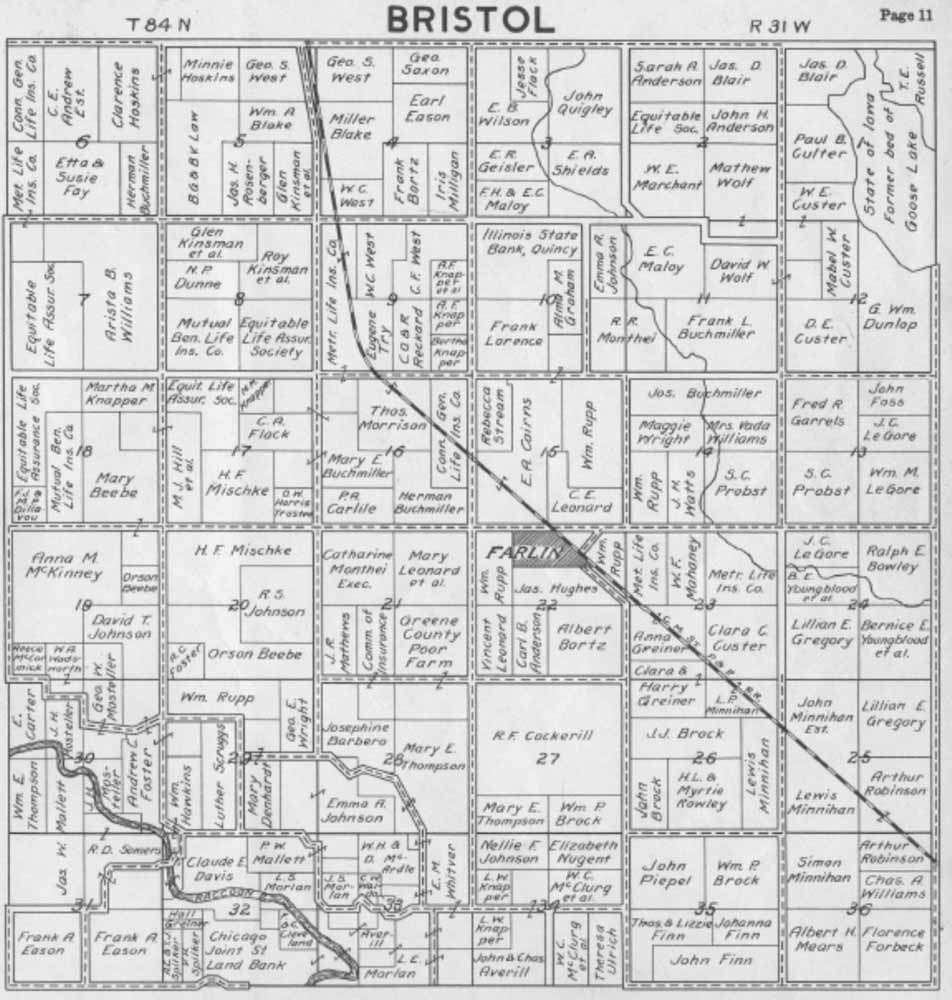
1935 map of Bristol

Bristol Township was established in 1857 in prairie land. In the July of 1860, A.W Jenkins recorded a census for Bristol which included 373 people, with over a hundred having been immigrated from Norway. In 1935 the population was 674, excluding Joice. The Strom School in Bristol was destroyed by a tornado in 1953. The Bristol Lutheran Church was torn down in 1969 after 77 years in use. In 2000, the Somber Lutheran Church, which was built in 1929, was destroyed in an act of arson.

== Geography and structures ==
Bristol Township has an elevation of 1296 feet. The 2000 census states there to have been 85 mobile homes. Saint Patrick's Catholic Cemetery is located in or around the township.

Bristol Township is geographically located next to Beaver Lake, Iowa.
