= Paton, Iowa =

- City
- Location of Paton, Iowa
- Coordinates: 42°09′52″N 94°15′18″W
- Country: United States
- State: Iowa
- County: Greene

Area
  - Total: 0.56 sq mi (1.46 km^{2})
  - Land: 0.56 sq mi (1.46 km^{2})
  - Water: 0 sq mi (0.00 km^{2})
- Elevation: 1,106 ft (337 m)

Population (2020)
  - Total: 221
  - Density: 393.3/sq mi (151.85/km^{2})
- Time zone: UTC−6 (Central (CST))
  - Summer (DST): UTC−5 (CDT)
- ZIP code: 50217
- Area code: 515
- FIPS code: 19-61815
- GNIS feature ID: 2396160

Paton is a city in Greene County, Iowa, United States. The population was 221 at the time of the 2020 census.

== History ==
Paton got its start following construction of the railroad through the area.

== Geography ==
According to the United States Census Bureau, the city has a total area of 0.56 square miles (1.45 km^{2}), all land.

== Demographics ==
Historical populations
Year	Pop.	±%
1880	84	—
1890	245	+191.7%
1900	328	+33.9%
1910	358	+9.1%
1920	414	+15.6%
1930	388	−6.3%
1940	394	+1.5%
1950	404	+2.5%
1960	370	−8.4%
1970	329	−11.1%
1980	291	−11.6%
1990	255	−12.4%
2000	265	+3.9%
2010	236	−10.9%
2020	221	−6.4%
Source:"U.S. Census website". United States Census Bureau. and Iowa Data Center; Source: U.S. Decennial Census

=== 2020 census ===
As of the census of 2020, there were 221 people, 93 households, and 60 families residing in the city. The population density was 393.3 inhabitants per square mile (151.8/km^{2}). There were 108 housing units at an average density of 192.2 per square mile (74.2/km^{2}). The racial makeup of the city was 98.2% White, 0.0% Black or African American, 0.5% Native American, 0.0% Asian, 0.0% Pacific Islander, 0.0% from other races and 1.4% from two or more races. Hispanic or Latino persons of any race comprised 1.4% of the population.

Of the 93 households, 25.8% of which had children under the age of 18 living with them, 46.2% were married couples living together, 9.7% were cohabitating couples, 20.4% had a female householder with no spouse or partner present and 23.7% had a male householder with no spouse or partner present. 35.5% of all households were non-families. 29.0% of all households were made up of individuals, 11.8% had someone living alone who was 65 years old or older.

The median age in the city was 35.1 years. 26.7% of the residents were under the age of 20; 3.6% were between the ages of 20 and 24; 31.2% were from 25 and 44; 25.3% were from 45 and 64; and 13.1% were 65 years of age or older. The gender makeup of the city was 53.4% male and 46.6% female.

=== 2010 census ===
At the 2010 census there were 236 people in 108 households, including 59 families, in the city. The population density was 421.4 inhabitants per square mile (162.7/km^{2}). There were 120 housing units at an average density of 214.3 per square mile (82.7/km^{2}). The racial makup of the city was 96.2% White, 1.7% African American, and 2.1% Native American. Hispanic or Latino of any race were 3.0%.

Of the 108 households 28.7% had children under the age of 18 living with them, 41.7% were married couples living together, 8.3% had a female householder with no husband present, 4.6% had a male householder with no wife present, and 45.4% were non-families. 42.6% of households were one person and 16.7% were one person aged 65 or older. The average household size was 2.19 and the average family size was 3.03.

The median age was 34.8 years. 25.8% of residents were under the age of 18; 7.7% were between the ages of 18 and 24; 25% were from 25 to 44; 27.2% were from 45 to 64; and 14.4% were 65 or older. The gender makeup of the city was 48.3% male and 51.7% female.

=== 2000 census ===
At the 2000 census there were 265 people in 118 households, including 71 families, in the city. The population density was 468.3 persons per square mile (179.5/km^{2}). There were 126 housing units at an average density of 222.7 per square mile (86.0/km^{2}). The racial makup of the city was 98.49% White, 0.38% Asian, 1.13% from other races. Hispanic or Latino of any race were 1.51%.

Of the 118 households 27.1% had children under the age of 18 living with them, 53.4% were married couples living together, 6.8% had a female householder with no husband present, and 39.0% were non-families. 37.3% of households were one person and 24.6% were one person aged 65 or older. The average household size was 2.25 and the average family size was 2.96.

In the city, the age distribution of the population shows 26.4% under the age of 18, 6.0% from 18 to 24, 24.5% from 25 to 44, 18.1% from 45 to 64, and 24.9% 65 or older. The median age was 41 years. For every 100 females, there were 93.4 males. For every 100 females age 18 and over, there were 89.3 males.

The median household income was $32,500 and the median family income was $46,250. Males had a median income of $27,083 versus $24,821 for females. The per capita income for the city was $15,256. About 4.5% of families and 7.8% of the population were below the poverty line, including 3.6% of those under the age of eighteen and 3.6% of those sixty five or over.

== Education ==
Paton-Churdan Community School District operates area public schools.

== Media ==
=== Popular culture ===
Pvt. James Francis Ryan (Matt Damon) of the 101st Airborne, title character of the movie Saving Private Ryan, tells Capt. Miller (Tom Hanks) that he is from Paton, Iowa.

Loren Shriver is a 1962 graduate of Paton High School and was a Space Shuttle astronaut. Shriver commanded the shuttle mission that deployed the Hubble Space Telescope into space.
