= Dawson Township, Greene County, Iowa =

Township in Greene County, Iowa, U.S.

Coordinates: 42.1661°N 94.3392°W

Dawson Township is a township in Greene County, Iowa, United States.

== History ==
Dawson Township was established in 1872. Dawson is the name of an early settler.
