= Woodbine Community School District =

Public school district in Woodbine, Iowa, United States

Address
- 501 Weare Street Woodbine, Iowa, 51579; United States
- Coordinates: 41.737627°N 95.707469°W

District information
- Type: Public school district
- Motto: Vision: Forging innovative alliances and pathways ~ Mission: Woodbine provides an environment where all are welcome and given access to personalized, unparalleled experiences that will positively shape futures. Values: Commitment ~ Doing what you say you will do - follow through! Collaboration and communication - Be vulnerable, trusting, and grace filled! Positive ~ Be aware of your affect on others! Focused on Growth ~ Think BIG! Goals: Academic, Culture, Growth
- Grades: PK–12
- Superintendent: Justin Wagner
- Schools: 2
- Budget: $8,551,000 (2020-21)
- NCES District ID: 1931920

Students and staff
- Enrollment: 534 (2022-23)
- Teachers: 42.96 FTE
- Staff: 45.78 FTE
- Student–teacher ratio: 12.43
- Athletic conference: Rolling Valley Conference
- District mascot: Tiger
- Colors: Black and old gold

Other information
- Website: www.woodbine.k12.ia.us

Woodbine Community School District is a rural public school district in Woodbine, Iowa, United States. It is mostly in Harrison County, with small areas in Shelby and Monona counties, and serves Woodbine and the surrounding rural areas.

== Schools ==
The school district operates two schools, both in the same building in Woodbine:

- Woodbine Elementary School
- Woodbine High School

=== Woodbine High School ===
==== Athletics ====
The Tigers compete in the Rolling Valley Conference in the following sports:

- Baseball
- Basketball
- Bowling
- Cross country
  - Boys' - 2-time Class 1A State Champions (1986, 1987)
  - Girls' 1984 Class 1A State Champions
- Football
- Golf
- Soccer
- Swimming
- Softball
- Track and field
  - Boys' - 2-time Class 1A State Champions (1989, 1992)
  - Girls' - 4-time State Champions (1973, 1974, 1975, 1993)
- Volleyball
- Wrestling

== See also ==
- List of school districts in Iowa
- List of high schools in Iowa
