= Audubon Community School District =

Public school in Iowa, United States

Coordinates: 41.712477°N 94.921800°W

Location
- Audubon, Iowa Audubon County and Guthrie County United States
- Coordinates: 41.712477, -94.921800

District information
- Type: Local school district
- Motto: Educate. Motivate. Inspire.
- Grades: K-12
- Superintendent: Eric Trager
- Schools: 2
- Budget: $9,059,000 (2020-21)
- NCES District ID: 1903960

Students and staff
- Students: 547 (2022-23)
- Teachers: 43.82 FTE
- Staff: 49.06 FTE
- Student–teacher ratio: 12.48
- Athletic conference: Western Iowa
- District mascot: Wheelers
- Colors: Red and White

Other information
- Website: www.audubon.k12.ia.us

The Audubon Community School District is a rural public school district headquartered in Audubon, Iowa.

The majority of the district is in eastern Audubon County, with a smaller area in Guthrie County. The district serves Audubon, Gray, and the surrounding rural areas.

The school mascot is the Wheeler and the colors are red and white.

Eric Trager has served as superintendent since 2019, after serving eight years as the principal for the middle-high school.

== Schools ==
The district operates two schools, both in Audubon:

- Audubon Elementary School
- Audubon Middle-High School

=== Audubon High School ===
==== Athletics ====
The Wheelers compete in the Western Iowa Conference in the following sports:

- Cross Country
- Volleyball
- Football
- Basketball
  - Girls' 5-time State Champions (1921, 1922, 1923, 1924, 1999)
- Wrestling
- Track and Field
- Golf
  - Boys' 3-time Class A State Champions (1967, 1970, 1971)
- Soccer
- Baseball
- Softball
