= Grandview Park Baptist School =

Former School in Iowa, United States

Coordinates: 41.609°N 93.550°W

Information
- Established: 1972
- Closed: 2014
- Grades: K-12
- Enrollment: c.530

Grandview Park Baptist School was a prominent Baptist Christian school situated on the east side of Des Moines, Iowa on East 33rd Ave. Offering a traditional educational approach, it served as a private institution deeply connected to the adjacent Grandview Park Baptist Church. Established in 1972 with a modest enrollment of 78 students in grades K-6, the school rapidly expanded to accommodate over 530 students across all grades K-12.

A cornerstone of the school's curriculum was the integration of Bible courses at every level, fostering a Biblical worldview that was tangible in all subjects and materials. The school also garnered recognition for its exceptional drama program, consistently producing high-quality plays and presentations open to the public.

== Sports ==
The Grandview Defenders, the school's athletic program, had a successful history, highlighted by two state playoff appearances in their first six years of football. They offered a range of sports, including basketball, football, varsity soccer, and volleyball, with the volleyball team achieving notable success, including a state championship title in 2002. The school was part of the Bluegrass Conference and produced two outstanding athletes who were recognized as 1A Players of the Year.

== Closure ==
The school closed its doors at the end of the 2013-2014 school year due to the separation of the church and school, resulting in the renaming of the church as Anchor Baptist Church and its complete independence. A significant number of school faculty members transitioned to Grand View Christian School, which was established the following year by former faculty of Grandview Park Baptist School.
