= Grant Township, Greene County, Iowa =

Township in Greene County, Iowa, U.S.

Coordinates: 41.9886°N 94.3306°W

Grant Township is a township in Greene County, Iowa, United States.

== History ==
Grant Township was established in 1877. It is named for former President of the United States Ulysses S. Grant.
