= Jefferson Square Commercial Historic District =

Historic district in Iowa, United States

- U.S. National Register of Historic Places
- U.S. Historic district
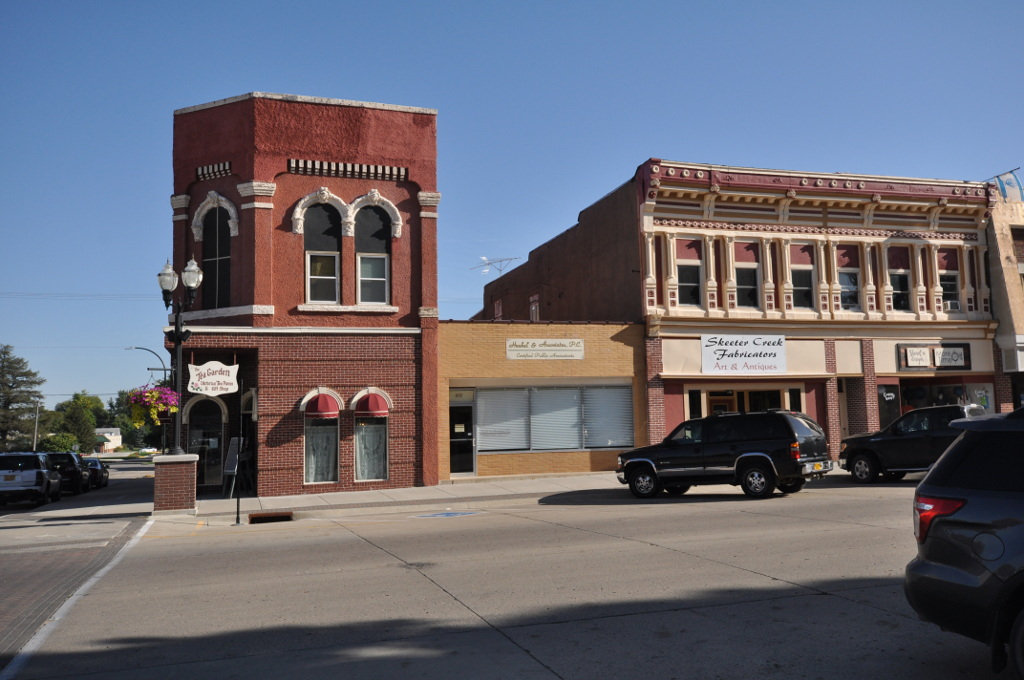

- Location within Iowa Location within the United States
- Location: Courthouse Sq. and fronting blocks of N. Wilson, N. Chestnut, E. Lincoln, E. State & 115 S. Wilson Sts., Jefferson, Iowa
- Coordinates: 42°0′56.9″N 94°22′26.9″W
- Area: 15 acres (6.1 ha)
- Architectural style: Late Victorian; Modern Movement
- NRHP reference No.: 11000503
- Added to NRHP: November 22, 2011

The Jefferson Square Commercial Historic District is a nationally recognized historic district located in Jefferson, Iowa, United States. It was listed on the National Register of Historic Places in 2011. At the time of its nomination the district consisted of 59 resources, including 38 contributing buildings, one contributing structure, one contributing object, 18 non-contributing buildings, and one non-contributing object. The district covers the original central business district. The commercial buildings are from one to three stories in height, and Late Victorian architectural styles dominate.

The period of significance dates from 1873, with the construction of the oldest recognizable surviving building, to 1966, with the completion of the Mahanay Memorial Carillon Tower. The tower dominates not only the district, but Jefferson as well. Planning for the tower began before World War II. The Modern Movement, limestone sheathed, structure stands on the southwest corner of the courthouse square, and rises 168 feet (51 m) to an enclosed viewing platform and open-air 14-bell carillon. The Greene County Courthouse (1917), a statue of Abraham Lincoln (1918), and a Lincoln Highway Marker (1928) are all on the square and are individually listed on the National Register. All four structures are also along the old Lincoln Highway, which passed along the south side of the square beginning in 1913. That was during a period of peak economic growth for the community (1912-1917) and the buildings along the square were substantially completed at that time.
