= Bristol Township, Greene County, Iowa =

Township in Greene County, Iowa, U.S.

Coordinates: 42.0814°N 94.4478°W

Bristol Township is a township in Greene County, Iowa, United States.

== History ==
Bristol Township was established in 1871.
