= Greene County Courthouse (Iowa) =

- U.S. National Register of Historic Places
- U.S. Historic district – Contributing property
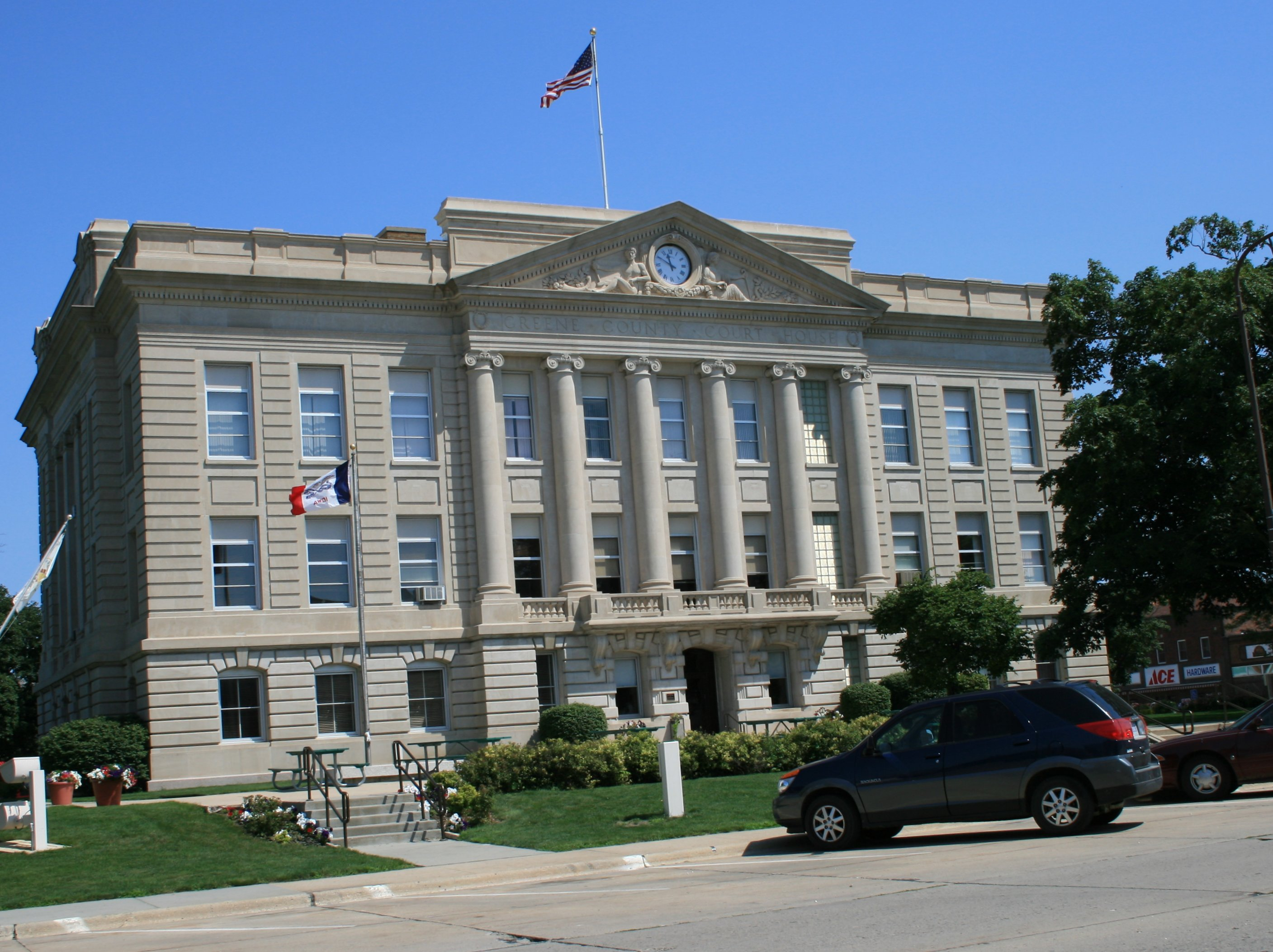

- Location within Iowa Location within the United States
- Location: E. Lincoln Way and Chestnut St., Jefferson, Iowa
- Coordinates: 42°0′56.8″N 94°22′27.1″W
- Built: 1918
- Architect: Proudfoot, Bird & Rawson
- Architectural style: Beaux Arts
- Part of: Jefferson Square Commercial Historic District (ID11000503)
- MPS: County Courthouses in Iowa TR
- NRHP reference No.: 78001222
- Added to NRHP: December 14, 1978

The Greene County Courthouse, located in Jefferson, Iowa, United States, was built in 1918. It was individually listed on the National Register of Historic Places in 1978 as a part of the County Courthouses in Iowa Thematic Resource. In 2011, it was included as a contributing property in the Jefferson Square Commercial Historic District. The courthouse is the third structure to house court functions and county administration. The courthouse features the Mahany Tower, a 120 feet bell tower.

== History ==
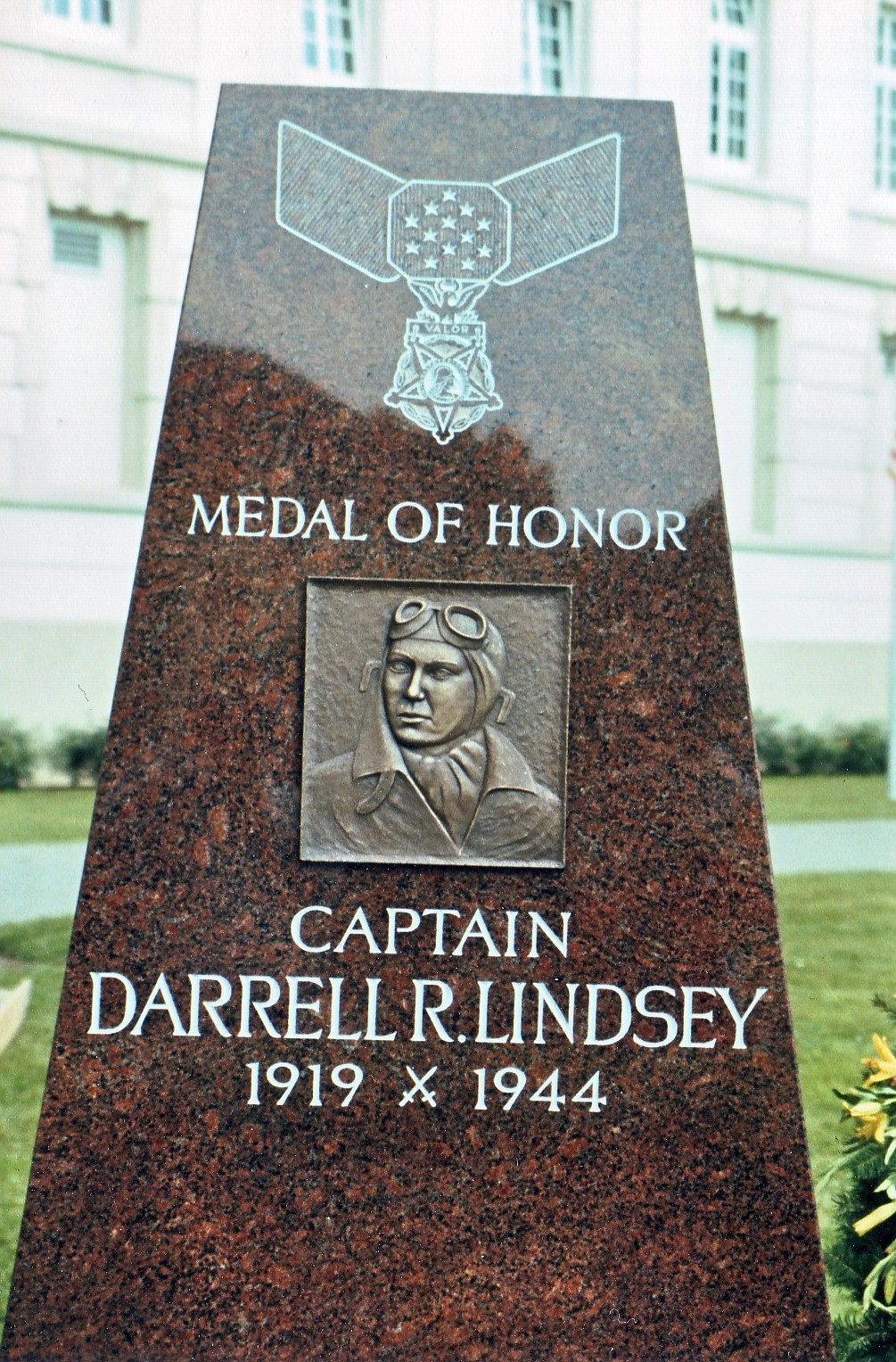
Lindsey Memorial

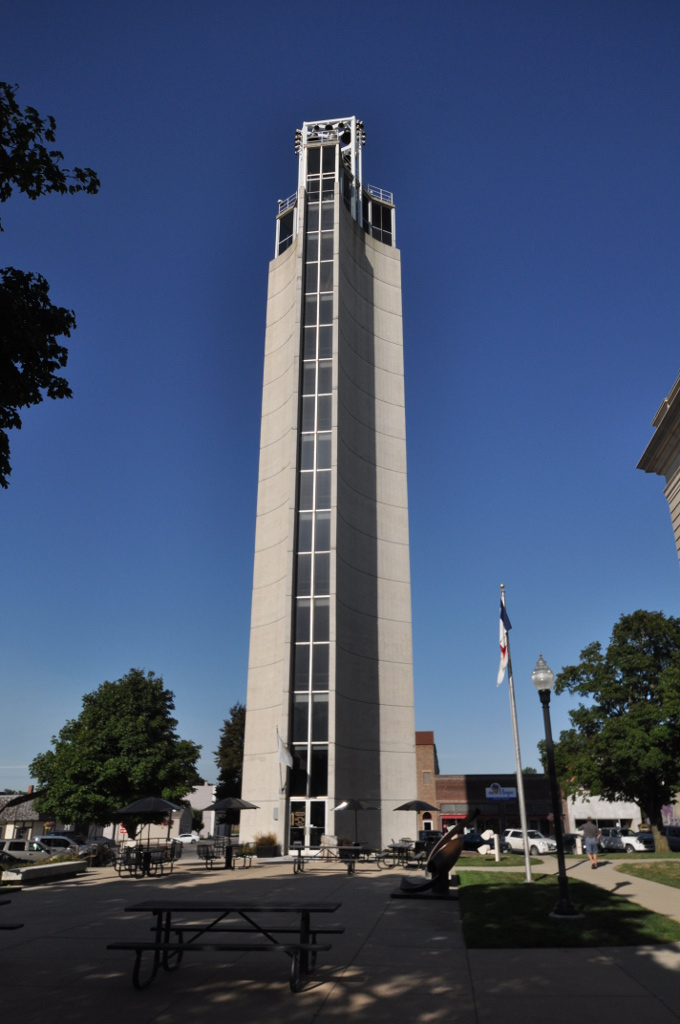
MahanayTower

The first courthouse in Greene County was a frame building built in 1856 for $1,825. Prior to that time the county officers were housed in the Thomas Phillips Building. The second courthouse was completed in 1870 for $37,000. The building featured a bell in the cupola that served as a fire alarm, called the court into session and announced curfew. The present courthouse was dedicated in 1917 and was built at a cost of $200,000.

A monument to President Abraham Lincoln was added in 1918 to commemorate the Lincoln Highway, which passes in front of the courthouse. The Mahanay Tower was built on the southwest corner of the courthouse grounds in 1966. In 1993, the Lindsey Memorial, commemorating Greene County native Darrell R. Lindsey, posthumous World War II Medal of Honor recipient, was relocated from the Lindsey Air Station in Wiesbaden, Germany to the southeast corner of the courthouse grounds.

== Architecture ==
The prominent Des Moines architectural firm of Proudfoot, Bird & Rawson designed the three-story building in the Beaux Arts style. The three-story structure measures about 124 by 86 feet (38 by 26 m), and its exterior is faced in Bedford Stone. The north and south elevations are identical, as are the east and west elevations. The main facades (the north and south elevations) feature Ionic porticos. A clock is set in the tympana of the triangular pediments. They are decorated with bas-relief figures and swags. The secondary facades feature Ionic pilastrades set in antis.

The interior of the building is organized around the central rotunda, which extends through from the basement to the attic. The rotunda floor features a 14 feet (4.3 m) mosaic tile reproduction of the county seal, and the ceiling is a stained glass dome. William Peaco painted the four murals that adorn the inner dome. They are entitled: The Buffalo Hunt, The Emigrants, The Pioneer and The Modern Farm.

== Mahanay Tower ==
The bell tower was built at a cost of $350,000 and funded by the estate of Mr. and Mrs. Floyd Mahanay and dedicated on October 16, 1966. The 165-foot (50 m) tower is in the Brutalist style with a three concave sides and contains 14 bells cast by the Petit & Fritsen Bell Foundry in Aarle-Rixtel in the Netherlands. The bells chime on the quarter-hour and can be operated by an electric keyboard. The tower has an observation deck at 120 feet (37 m) that is accessed via a glass elevator.
