= Greene County, Iowa =

County in Iowa, United States

- County
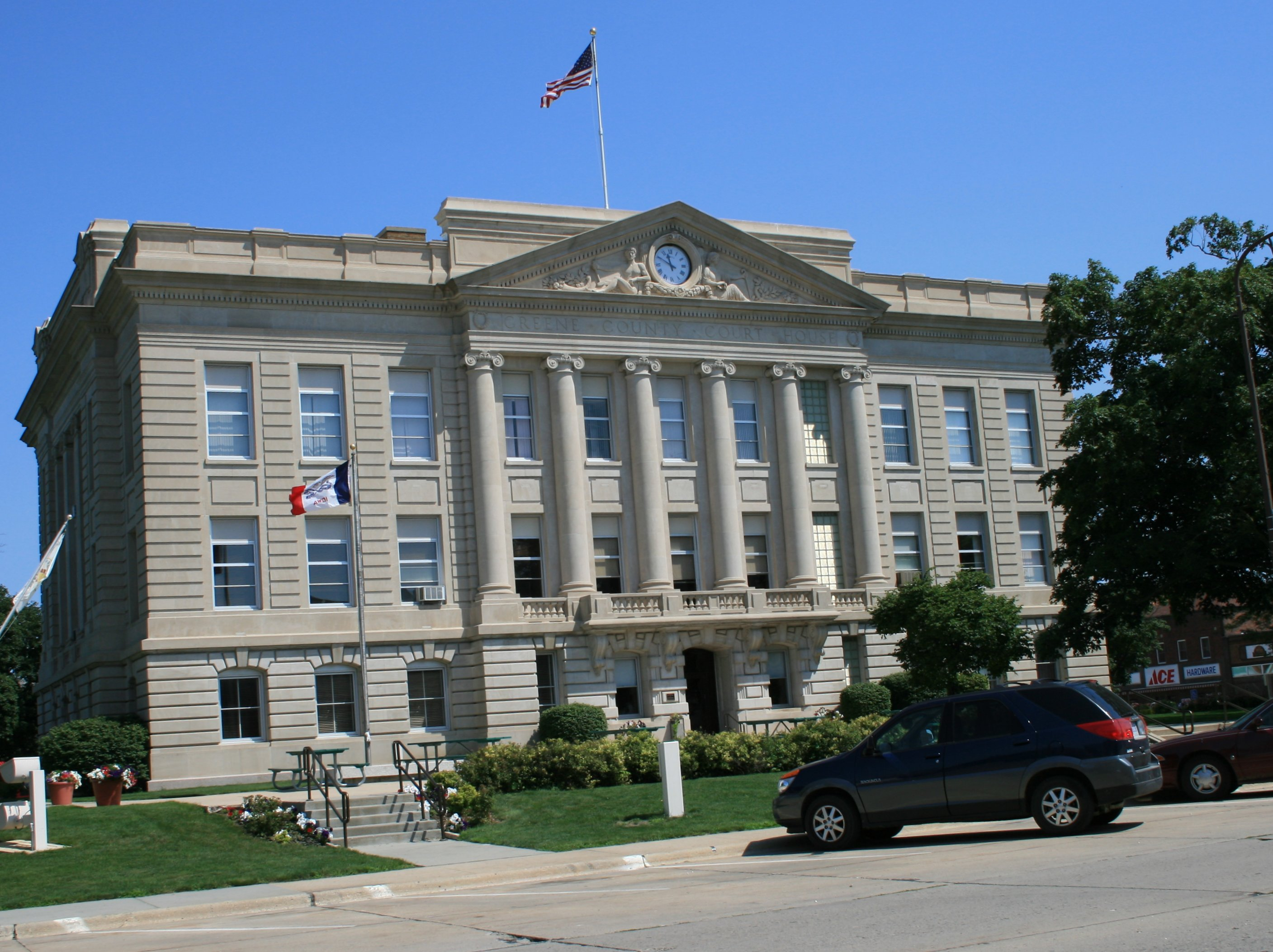
- Greene County Courthouse

- Location within the U.S. state of Iowa
- Coordinates: 42°02′07″N 94°23′44″W
- Country: United States
- State: Iowa
- Founded: 1851
- Named for: Nathanael Greene
- Seat: Jefferson
- Largest city: Jefferson

Area
  - Total: 571 sq mi (1,480 km^{2})
  - Land: 570 sq mi (1,500 km^{2})
  - Water: 1.6 sq mi (4.1 km^{2}) 0.3%

Population (2020)
  - Total: 8,771
  - Estimate (2025): 8,658 ▼
  - Density: 15/sq mi (5.9/km^{2})
- Time zone: UTC−6 (Central)
  - Summer (DST): UTC−5 (CDT)
- Congressional district: 4th
- Website: www.greenecounty.iowa.gov
- Iowa county number 37

Greene County is a county located in the U.S. state of Iowa. As of the 2020 census, the population was 8,771. The county seat is Jefferson. The county is named in honor of General Nathanael Greene.

== History ==
Greene County was formed on January 15, 1851, and from 1854, self-governed. It was named after General Nathanael Greene, a hero in the Revolutionary War. The first European settler was Truman Davis. He settled on the Raccoon River. The first courthouse was built in 1856 from wood. Previously, court was held in a log cabin southeast of Jefferson. The second courthouse, of red brick, was built in 1870. The present Greene County Courthouse used today was built in 1917.

== Geography ==
According to the U.S. Census Bureau, the county has a total area of 571 square miles (1,480 km^{2}), of which 570 square miles (1,500 km^{2}) is land and 1.6 square miles (4.1 km^{2}) (0.3%) is water.

Soils of Greene County

=== Major highways ===
- U.S. Highway 30
- Iowa Highway 4
- Iowa Highway 25
- Iowa Highway 144

=== Adjacent counties ===
- Calhoun County (northwest)
- Webster County (northeast)
- Boone County (east)
- Dallas County (southeast)
- Guthrie County (south)
- Carroll County (west)

== Demographics ==
Historical population
Census	Pop.	Note	%±
1860	1,374		—
1870	4,627		236.8%
1880	12,727		175.1%
1890	15,797		24.1%
1900	17,820		12.8%
1910	16,023		−10.1%
1920	16,467		2.8%
1930	16,528		0.4%
1940	16,599		0.4%
1950	15,544		−6.4%
1960	14,379		−7.5%
1970	12,716		−11.6%
1980	12,119		−4.7%
1990	10,045		−17.1%
2000	10,366		3.2%
2010	9,336		−9.9%
2020	8,771		−6.1%
2025 (est.)	8,658	▼	−1.3%
U.S. Decennial Census; 1790–1960 1900–1990; 1990–2000 2010–2020

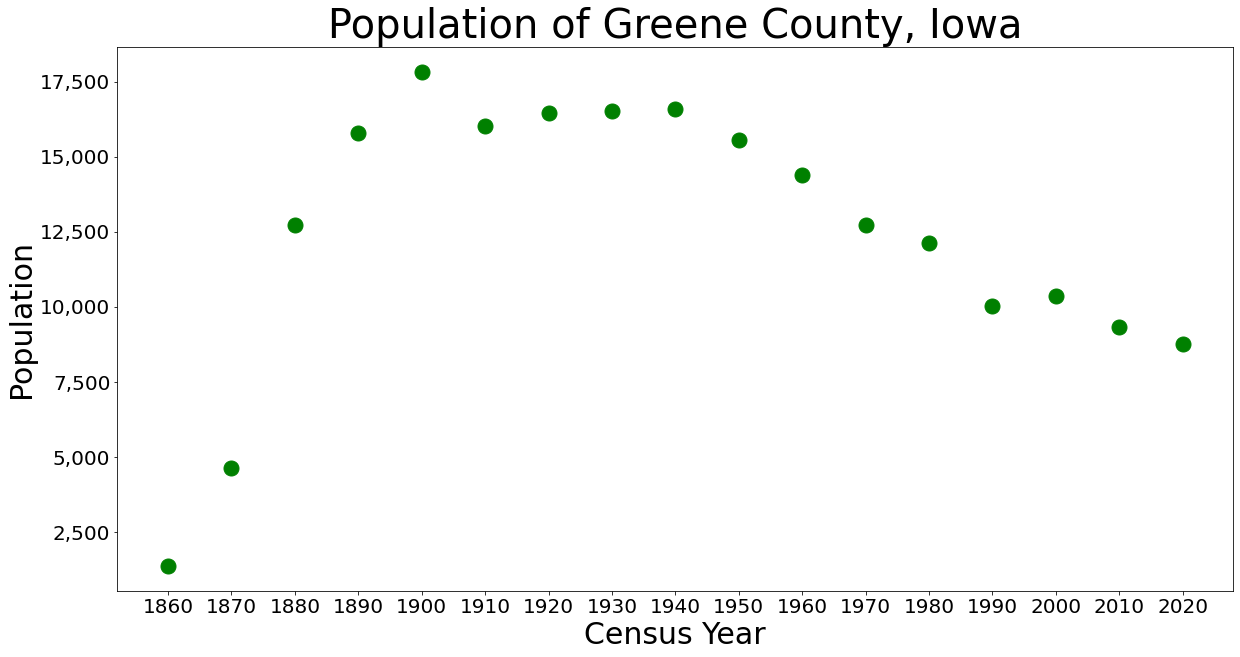
Population of Greene County from US census data

=== 2020 census ===
As of the 2020 census, the county had a population of 8,771 and a population density of 15.3/sq mi (5.9/km^{2}). There were 4,309 housing units, of which 3,802 were occupied; 11.8% of units were vacant, 76.4% of occupied units were owner-occupied, 23.6% were renter-occupied, and the homeowner and rental vacancy rates were 2.0% and 10.6%, respectively.

There were 3,802 households, of which 25.5% had children under the age of 18 living in them. Of all households, 49.5% were married-couple households, 19.1% were households with a male householder and no spouse or partner present, and 24.8% were households with a female householder and no spouse or partner present. About 32.1% of all households were made up of individuals and 16.9% had someone living alone who was 65 years of age or older.

The median age was 44.9 years. 22.3% of residents were under the age of 18 and 23.7% of residents were 65 years of age or older. For every 100 females there were 96.7 males, and for every 100 females age 18 and over there were 95.8 males age 18 and over.

96.21% of the population reported being of one race. The racial makeup of the county was 94.2% White, 0.3% Black or African American, 0.2% American Indian and Alaska Native, 0.6% Asian, <0.1% Native Hawaiian and Pacific Islander, 1.0% from some other race, and 3.8% from two or more races. Hispanic or Latino residents of any race comprised 2.9% of the population.

<0.1% of residents lived in urban areas, while 100.0% lived in rural areas.

=== 2010 census ===
The 2010 census recorded a population of 9,336 in the county, with a population density of 16.4/sq mi (6.3/km^{2}). There were 4,546 housing units, of which 3,996 were occupied.

=== 2000 census ===
As of the census of 2000, there were 10,366 people, 4,205 households, and 2,859 families residing in the county. The population density was 18 people per square mile (6.9 people/km^{2}). There were 4,623 housing units at an average density of 8 units per square mile (3.1 units/km^{2}). The racial makeup of the county was 98.16% White, 0.14% Black or African American, 0.15% Native American, 0.24% Asian, 0.01% Pacific Islander, 0.67% from other races, and 0.63% from two or more races. 1.66% of the population were Hispanic or Latino of any race.

There were 4,205 households, out of which 30.70% had children under the age of 18 living with them, 57.30% were married couples living together, 7.20% had a female householder with no husband present, and 32.00% were non-families. 29.10% of all households were made up of individuals, and 16.60% had someone living alone who was 65 years of age or older. The average household size was 2.41 and the average family size was 2.97.

In the county, the population was spread out, with 25.60% under the age of 18, 6.10% from 18 to 24, 24.30% from 25 to 44, 22.40% from 45 to 64, and 21.60% who were 65 years of age or older. The median age was 41 years. For every 100 females there were 95.50 males. For every 100 females age 18 and over, there were 89.20 males.

The median income for a household in the county was $33,883, and the median income for a family was $41,230. Males had a median income of $29,076 versus $21,657 for females. The per capita income for the county was $16,866. About 4.80% of families and 8.10% of the population were below the poverty line, including 8.90% of those under age 18 and 7.80% of those age 65 or over.

== Cities and towns ==
- Churdan
- Dana
- Grand Junction
- Jefferson
- Paton
- Ralston
- Rippey
- Scranton

=== Unincorporated communities ===
- Adaza
- Cooper
- Farlin
- Green Brier
- Winkelmans

=== Townships ===
- Bristol
- Cedar
- Dawson
- Franklin
- Grant
- Greenbrier
- Hardin
- Highland
- Jackson
- Jefferson
- Junction
- Kendrick
- Paton
- Scranton
- Washington
- Willow

=== Population ranking ===
The population ranking of the following table is based on the 2020 census of Greene County.

† county seat

Rank	City/Town/etc.	Municipal type	Population (2020 Census)
1	† Jefferson	City	4,182
2	Grand Junction	City	725
3	Scranton	City	511
4	Churdan	City	365
5	Rippey	City	220
6	Paton	City	221
7	Ralston (partially in Carroll County)	City	81
8	Dana	City	38

== Politics ==
United States presidential election results for Greene County, Iowa
Year	Republican		Democratic		Third party(ies)	
Year	No.	%	No.	%	No.	%
1896	2,606	60.80%	1,629	38.01%	51	1.19%
1900	2,777	65.88%	1,360	32.27%	78	1.85%
1904	2,583	70.27%	908	24.70%	185	5.03%
1908	2,574	67.28%	1,152	30.11%	100	2.61%
1912	1,324	37.17%	980	27.51%	1,258	35.32%
1916	2,345	60.85%	1,455	37.75%	54	1.40%
1920	5,102	78.98%	1,303	20.17%	55	0.85%
1924	4,599	66.76%	790	11.47%	1,500	21.77%
1928	4,299	67.84%	2,007	31.67%	31	0.49%
1932	2,360	44.71%	2,747	52.05%	171	3.24%
1936	3,384	44.77%	3,961	52.40%	214	2.83%
1940	3,920	52.22%	3,566	47.51%	20	0.27%
1944	3,437	54.88%	2,797	44.66%	29	0.46%
1948	3,059	48.63%	2,946	46.84%	285	4.53%
1952	5,378	69.62%	2,228	28.84%	119	1.54%
1956	4,255	59.41%	2,802	39.12%	105	1.47%
1960	4,063	58.43%	2,879	41.40%	12	0.17%
1964	2,141	35.77%	3,828	63.95%	17	0.28%
1968	3,208	55.93%	2,208	38.49%	320	5.58%
1972	3,371	59.35%	2,152	37.89%	157	2.76%
1976	2,811	46.94%	3,094	51.66%	84	1.40%
1980	3,154	53.11%	2,210	37.21%	575	9.68%
1984	2,579	46.44%	2,831	50.97%	144	2.59%
1988	2,091	40.49%	3,011	58.31%	62	1.20%
1992	1,952	36.47%	2,422	45.25%	979	18.29%
1996	1,861	38.78%	2,519	52.49%	419	8.73%
2000	2,282	48.36%	2,301	48.76%	136	2.88%
2004	2,618	51.20%	2,459	48.09%	36	0.70%
2008	2,349	48.90%	2,371	49.35%	84	1.75%
2012	2,380	49.11%	2,375	49.01%	91	1.88%
2016	2,820	58.49%	1,691	35.08%	310	6.43%
2020	3,223	63.73%	1,769	34.98%	65	1.29%
2024	3,211	65.79%	1,603	32.84%	67	1.37%

== Education ==
School districts include:

- Coon Rapids–Bayard Community School District
- Glidden–Ralston Community School District
- Greene County Community School District - Formed on July 1, 2014.
- Panorama Community School District
- Paton-Churdan Community School District
- Perry Community School District
- South Central Calhoun Community School District - Formed on July 1, 2014.
- Southeast Valley Community School District - Formed on July 1, 2023.

Former districts

- East Greene Community School District - Merged into the Greene County district on July 1, 2014.
- Jefferson–Scranton Community School District - Merged into the Greene County district on July 1, 2014.
- Prairie Valley Community School District - Merged into Southeast Valley on July 1, 2023.
- Southern Cal Community School District - Merged into the South Central Calhoun district on July 1, 2014.
- Southeast Webster-Grand Community School District - Merged into Southeast Valley on July 1, 2023.

== Notable people ==
- George Horace Gallup (1901–1984), former resident, American statistician, invented the Gallup poll, a successful statistical method of survey sampling for measuring public opinion.
- Loren Shriver (b. 1944), former resident, American astronaut, retired United States Air Force colonel.
- Warren Allen Smith (1921–2017), former resident, American homosexual activist, writer and humanist.
- Doreen Wilber (1930–2008), former resident, American archer, Olympic gold medalist.

== See also ==
- National Register of Historic Places listings in Greene County, Iowa
- Raccoon River Valley Trail
