= Churdan, Iowa =

- City
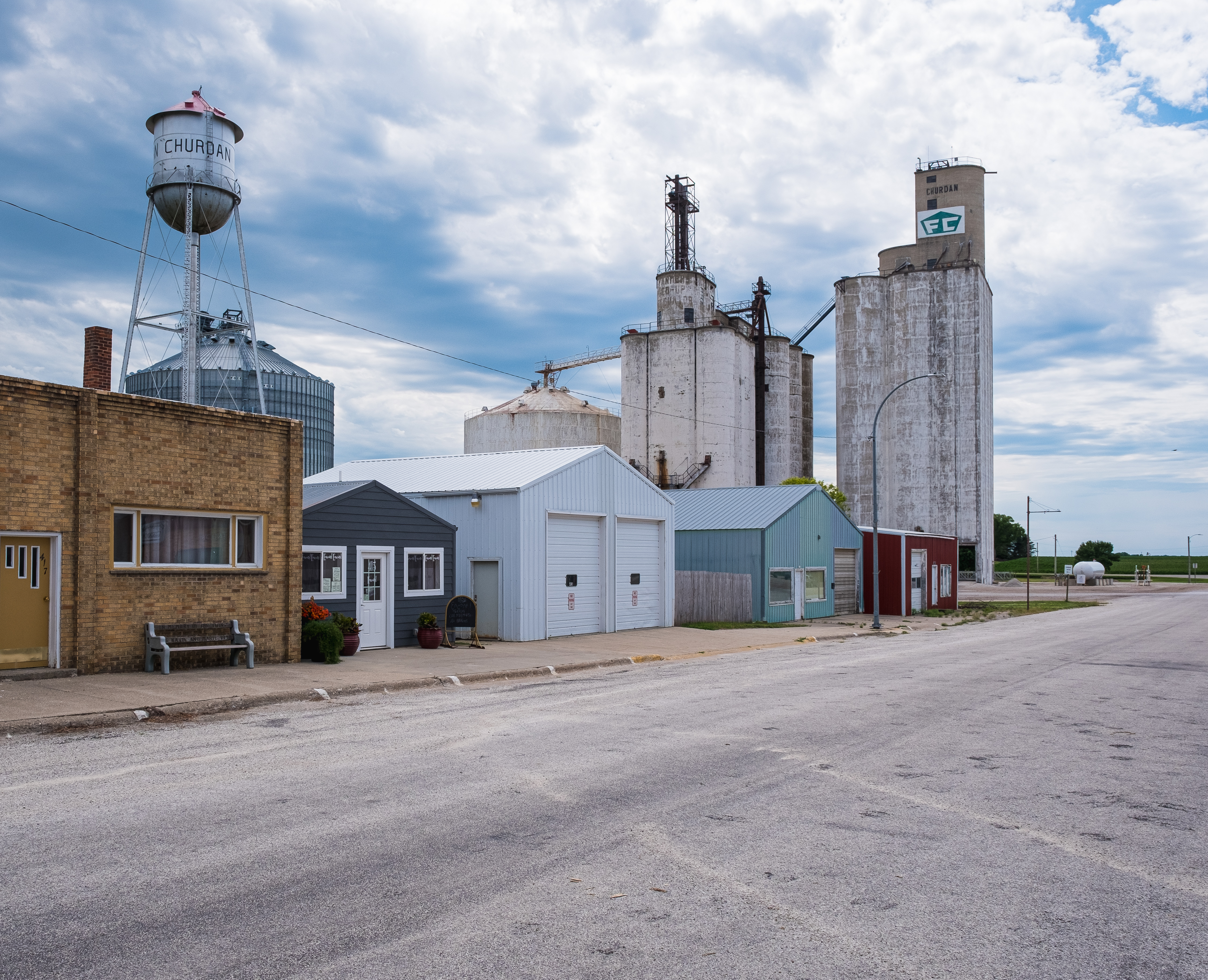
- Looking west on Sand street in Churdan

- Location of Churdan, Iowa
- Coordinates: 42°09′15″N 94°28′41″W
- Country: USA
- State: Iowa
- County: Greene

Area
  - Total: 2.07 sq mi (5.37 km^{2})
  - Land: 2.07 sq mi (5.36 km^{2})
  - Water: 0.0039 sq mi (0.01 km^{2})
- Elevation: 1,122 ft (342 m)

Population (2020)
  - Total: 365
  - Density: 176.4/sq mi (68.09/km^{2})
- Time zone: UTC-6 (Central (CST))
  - Summer (DST): UTC-5 (CDT)
- ZIP code: 50050
- Area code: 515
- FIPS code: 19-13350
- GNIS feature ID: 2393523

Churdan (Note: /ʃərˈdæn/) is a city in Greene County, Iowa, United States. The population was 365 at the 2020 census.

== History ==
Churdan got its start in the year 1882, following construction of the railroad through the territory. It was named for Joseph Churdan, a pioneer settler who served as the village's first postmaster. Churdan was incorporated as a town in 1884.

== Geography ==
According to the United States Census Bureau, the city has a total area of 2.11 square miles (5.46 km^{2}), all land.

== Demographics ==
Historical populations
Year	Pop.	±%
1890	377	—
1900	626	+66.0%
1910	667	+6.5%
1920	763	+14.4%
1930	616	−19.3%
1940	677	+9.9%
1950	593	−12.4%
1960	586	−1.2%
1970	598	+2.0%
1980	540	−9.7%
1990	423	−21.7%
2000	418	−1.2%
2010	386	−7.7%
2020	365	−5.4%
Source:"U.S. Census website". United States Census Bureau. and Iowa Data Center; Source: U.S. Decennial Census

=== 2020 census ===
As of the census of 2020, there were 365 people, 162 households, and 92 families residing in the city. The population density was 176.3 inhabitants per square mile (68.1/km^{2}). There were 191 housing units at an average density of 92.3 per square mile (35.6/km^{2}). The racial makeup of the city was 95.9% White, 1.4% Black or African American, 0.0% Native American, 0.0% Asian, 0.0% Pacific Islander, 0.5% from other races and 2.2% from two or more races. Hispanic or Latino persons of any race comprised 2.2% of the population.

Of the 162 households, 29.0% of which had children under the age of 18 living with them, 42.0% were married couples living together, 9.3% were cohabitating couples, 28.4% had a female householder with no spouse or partner present and 20.4% had a male householder with no spouse or partner present. 43.2% of all households were non-families. 35.8% of all households were made up of individuals, 22.2% had someone living alone who was 65 years old or older.

The median age in the city was 40.1 years. 27.4% of the residents were under the age of 20; 5.8% were between the ages of 20 and 24; 22.2% were from 25 and 44; 21.9% were from 45 and 64; and 22.7% were 65 years of age or older. The gender makeup of the city was 46.8% male and 53.2% female.

=== 2010 census ===
As of the census of 2010, there were 386 people, 177 households, and 103 families residing in the city. The population density was 182.9 inhabitants per square mile (70.6/km^{2}). There were 203 housing units at an average density of 96.2 per square mile (37.1/km^{2}). The racial makeup of the city was 94.6% White, 1.0% African American, 0.8% Native American, 1.0% Asian, 0.3% Pacific Islander, 0.8% from other races, and 1.6% from two or more races. Hispanic or Latino of any race were 0.8% of the population.

There were 177 households, of which 22.6% had children under the age of 18 living with them, 44.6% were married couples living together, 7.9% had a female householder with no husband present, 5.6% had a male householder with no wife present, and 41.8% were non-families. 37.3% of all households were made up of individuals, and 21.5% had someone living alone who was 65 years of age or older. The average household size was 2.18 and the average family size was 2.86.

The median age in the city was 48.2 years. 21.5% of residents were under the age of 18; 7.6% were between the ages of 18 and 24; 18% were from 25 to 44; 28.1% were from 45 to 64; and 25.1% were 65 years of age or older. The gender makeup of the city was 46.1% male and 53.9% female.

=== 2000 census ===
As of the census of 2000, there were 418 people, 192 households, and 123 families residing in the city. The population density was 197.5 inhabitants per square mile (76.3/km^{2}). There were 214 housing units at an average density of 101.1 per square mile (39.0/km^{2}). The racial makeup of the city was 99.76% White and 0.24% African American.

There were 192 households, out of which 24.5% had children under the age of 18 living with them, 54.2% were married couples living together, 6.8% had a female householder with no husband present, and 35.9% were non-families. 34.9% of all households were made up of individuals, and 24.0% had someone living alone who was 65 years of age or older. The average household size was 2.18 and the average family size was 2.79.

In the city, the population was spread out, with 21.8% under the age of 18, 6.5% from 18 to 24, 20.3% from 25 to 44, 23.7% from 45 to 64, and 27.8% who were 65 years of age or older. The median age was 46 years. For every 100 females, there were 97.2 males. For every 100 females age 18 and over, there were 90.1 males.

The median income for a household in the city was $26,932, and the median income for a family was $32,273. Males had a median income of $23,594 versus $21,413 for females. The per capita income for the city was $17,090. About 10.9% of families and 13.8% of the population were below the poverty line, including 20.8% of those under age 18 and 11.7% of those age 65 or over.

== Economy ==
Churdan and nearby Paton, work together as communities and have several general businesses. These cities also serve as the medical and service centers for the area.

== Education ==
The Paton-Churdan Community School is a public school for students from kindergarten to grade twelve in the Paton and Churdan area. The school was formed in 1962 when the Paton and Churdan schools combined to form the Paton-Churdan Community School District.

The school district is primarily an agricultural, rural area in northern Greene County which includes the communities of Paton and Churdan The school, K-12, is located in Churdan. The land area covers approximately 125 square miles (320 km^{2}) of highly productive farmland. Geographically, the district is centrally located between Jefferson (13 miles), Carroll (25 miles), Fort Dodge (30 miles) and Lake City (25 miles). During the second half of the school day, high school students are transported to the Jefferson-Scranton High School for additional classes.

== See also ==
- St. Patrick's Catholic Church, Cedar, listed on the National Register of Historic Places.
