= John Young Stone =

American politician (1843–1928)

John Young Stone (23 April 1843 – 26 June 1928) was an American politician.

== Early life and family ==
John Young Stone was born near Springfield, Illinois, on 23 April 1843. He was one of three children of parents Mary Ellen McLemore and William Langford Stone. The Stone family moved to Silver Creek Township, Mills County, Iowa, after his mother's death in February 1856, following his grandfather, Spencer Stone, who had acquired land in the township three years previously.

== Non-political career ==
Stone served in the American Civil War with the Union Army from 1861. He was elevated to the rank of first lieutenant by the end of the conflict, after which he became a newspaper publisher. He was part-owner of the Glenwood Opinion alongside P. T. Ballard, and also edited the publication for two years, starting at the age of 22. Stone pursued a career in law as well, practicing alongside William Hale, with whom he had read law until passing the bar in 1868. From 1884, Stone began planting an apple orchard in Mills County. His land holdings later included a vineyard, and by 1892, numbered 800 acres, 100,000 trees and 75,000 grapevines. This venture ended after blight and a cold winter heavily affected yield.

== Political career ==
Politically, Stone was affiliated with the Republican Party. He served two consecutive terms as a member of the Iowa House of Representatives from 1868 to 1872, two years each for District 16 and District 17. Stone was then elected to a single four-year term on the Iowa Senate for District 9. Between 1876 and 1880, Stone returned to the lower house of the state legislature, representing District 18 until 1878, when he assumed the District 20 seat. From 1876 to 1878, Stone was speaker of the house. Concurrently with his second stint as a state representative, Stone served as a member of the Republican National Committee. He was a delegate to two Republican National Conventions, in 1876 and 1884. Stone again held statewide office between 1889 and 1895, serving as Attorney General of Iowa.

== Death ==
On 26 June 1928, Stone died in Glenwood, Iowa.
