= Glenwood Township, Mills County, Iowa =

Township in Iowa, USA

Coordinates: 41°02′N 95°45′W

Glenwood Township is a township in Mills County, Iowa, United States.

== History ==
When Mills County was formed in 1851, retention of the minutes and recording of official acts was overlooked. So early county records are incomplete. The retained documents begin in March 1853, with five townships already organized and in existence: West Liberty Township, Plattville Township, Rawles Township, Council Bluffs Township, and Silver Creek Township. On 16 February 1857 West Liberty Township changed its name to Glenwood Township.
