= Mineola, Iowa =

- Census-designated place
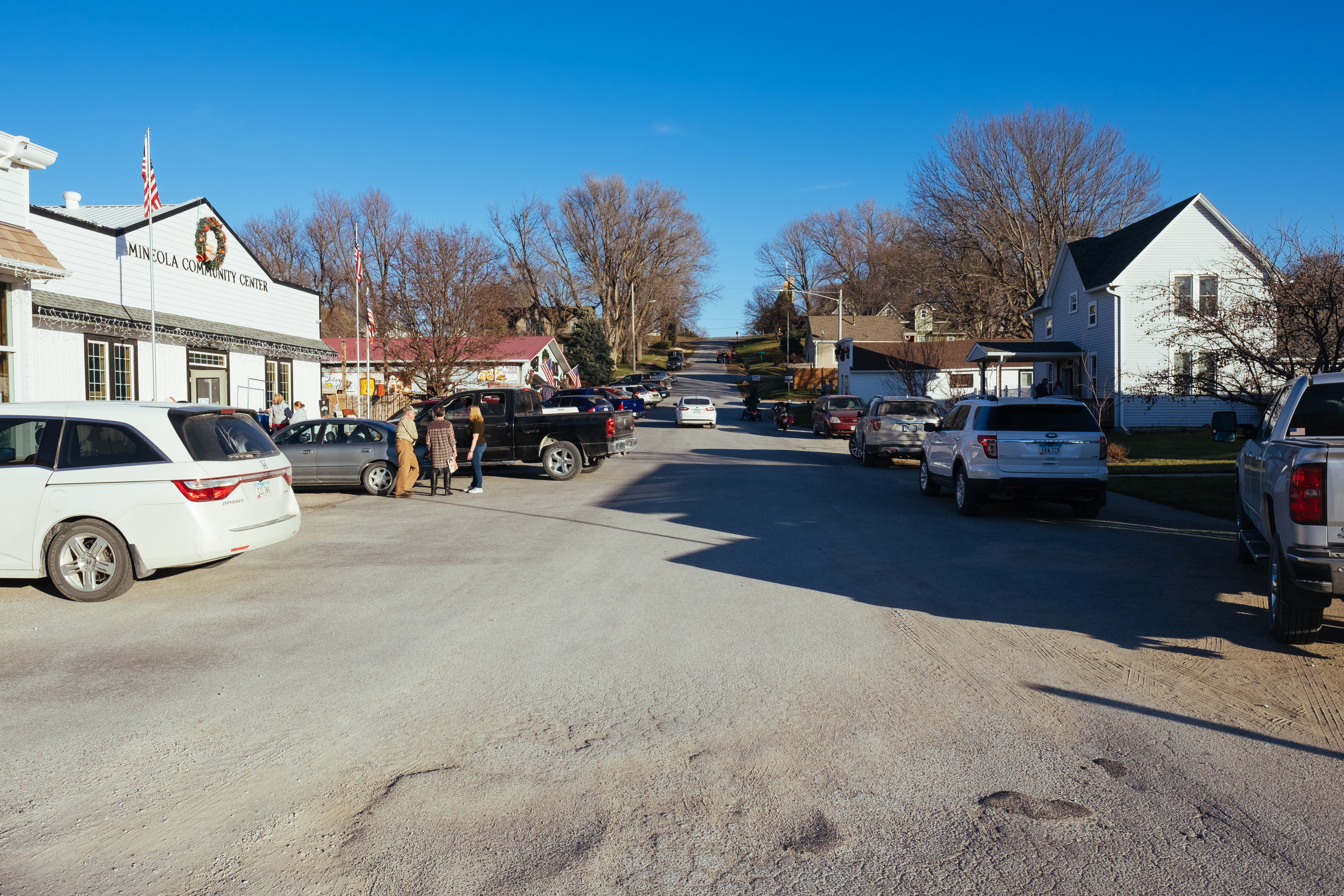
- Main Street

- Location within Iowa Location within the United States
- Coordinates: 41°08′29″N 95°41′41″W
- Country: United States
- State: Iowa
- County: Mills

Area
  - Total: 0.39 sq mi (1.01 km^{2})
  - Land: 0.39 sq mi (1.01 km^{2})
  - Water: 0 sq mi (0.00 km^{2})
- Elevation: 1,050 ft (320 m)

Population (2020)
  - Total: 154
  - Density: 400/sq mi (153/km^{2})
- Time zone: UTC-6 (Central (CST))
  - Summer (DST): UTC-5 (CDT)
- ZIP code: 51554
- FIPS code: 19-52635
- GNIS feature ID: 2583488

Mineola is an unincorporated village and census-designated place (CDP) in Mills County, Iowa, United States.

As of the 2020 census, the population of Mineola was 154.

Mineola is in the Glenwood Community School District.

== Geography ==
Mineola is in northern Mills County, 8 miles (13 km) north of Glenwood, the county seat, and 13 miles (21 km) southeast of Council Bluffs. According to the U.S. Census Bureau, the Mineola CDP has an area of 0.39 square miles (1.01 km^{2}), all land. It sits on the east side of the valley of Keg Creek, which flows south to the Missouri River southeast of Plattsmouth, Nebraska.

== History ==
Mineola's population was 135 in 1940.

A post office has operated in Mineola since 1880.

== Demographics ==
Historical population
Census	Pop.	Note	%±
2010	166		—
2020	154		−7.2%
U.S. Decennial Census

=== 2020 census ===
As of the census of 2020, there were 154 people, 58 households, and 42 families residing in the community. The population density was 396.3 inhabitants per square mile (153.0/km^{2}). There were 63 housing units at an average density of 162.1 per square mile (62.6/km^{2}). The racial makeup of the community was 91.6% White, 0.6% Black or African American, 0.0% Native American, 0.0% Asian, 0.0% Pacific Islander, 1.9% from other races and 5.8% from two or more races. Hispanic or Latino persons of any race comprised 3.9% of the population.

Of the 58 households, 37.9% of which had children under the age of 18 living with them, 65.5% were married couples living together, 10.3% were cohabitating couples, 10.3% had a female householder with no spouse or partner present and 13.8% had a male householder with no spouse or partner present. 27.6% of all households were non-families. 17.2% of all households were made up of individuals, 6.9% had someone living alone who was 65 years old or older.

The median age in the community was 40.8 years. 31.2% of the residents were under the age of 20; 4.5% were between the ages of 20 and 24; 16.2% were from 25 and 44; 33.8% were from 45 and 64; and 14.3% were 65 years of age or older. The gender makeup of the community was 57.8% male and 42.2% female.

== See also ==
- Balfour, Iowa
