= Glenwood Resource Center =

Psychiatric hospital

Coordinates: 41.039743°N 95.741494°W

Hospital in 1904

The Iowa Institution for Feeble-Minded Children was a psychiatric hospital for the treatment of what was then known as mental retardation located in the Loess Hills adjacent to Glenwood, Iowa. The facility is now known as the Glenwood Resource Center. This center has been condemned by the US Department of Justice for violation of the 14th Amendment, due to poor treatment of residents and dangerous experiments on residents. In 2022, Governor Kim Reynolds announced that Glenwood would close in 2024.

== Origins ==
The IIFMC originated in 1866 when Glenwood was selected as the location of a new state-funded Civil War Orphan's Home following the donation of 15 acres (61,000 m^{2}) by community residents. One of the most notable residents of the Orphan's Home at Glenwood was future baseball player and evangelist Billy Sunday. The state orphanage at Glenwood closed in early 1876.

In March 1876, the Iowa legislature designated the grounds of the former Glenwood Orphan's Home as the location for the first Iowa Asylum for Feeble-Minded Children. Canadian immigrant Dr. O.W. Archibald was appointed the first medical superintendent and the facility opened on September 1. Archibald's 1877 Annual Report listed 85 children and already crowded conditions. It then became the Iowa Institution for Feeble-Minded Children, and Dr. J.A. Donelan was hired in 1879 as the first "consulting physician."

In 1882, Archibald was replaced as medical superintendent by Dr. Francis Marion Powell. At the time of his appointment, the IIFMC consisted of the buildings of the Orphan's Home, a 160-acre (0.65 km^{2}) farm, and an additional 20 acres (81,000 m^{2}). In 1884 the Old Administration Building was constructed based on several principles of the "building as cure" Kirkbride Plan. Also, age restrictions were abolished with the creation of a new Custodial Division and by 1886 the institution was home to 259 people. Additional buildings were constructed as the grounds expanded and the resident population grew to 815 people by 1899.

== 20th century ==
In 1902 the Chicago, Burlington, and Quincy Railroad relocated and double-tracked the rail line through Glenwood, cutting across the grounds of the IIFMC. The next year a tornado struck the facility, killing two children and damaging several buildings.

Powell resigned in 1903 and was replaced by his former chief assistant and English immigrant Dr. George Mogridge. The IIFMC would expand to over 1,000 acres (4.0 km^{2}) during Mogride's 31 years as superintendent as it became its own self-contained community isolated from the rest of Glenwood by a wrought iron fence. By 1908 the resident population numbered 1,100 people overseen by a staff of 175.

During the 1930s the IIFMC was described by the WPA Southwestern Iowa Guide as a "group of modern structures, beautifully landscaped grounds, farm tracts, orchards, and gardens, all tended by those admitted to the institution". The Guide listed a staff of 20 teachers and 1,814 patients, including 623 children.

Mogridge retired in 1935 and was replaced by Dr. Harold Dye the next year. In 1939 Dye would help conduct a landmark psychological experiment using residents of the IIFMC and was also replaced as superintendent at Glenwood by Dr. Thomas Lacey. Dr. Lacey had been serving as the assistant superintendent since 1911, and the facility's name was changed to the Glenwood State-Hospital School. Following Dr. Lacey's death in 1944, Dr. V.J. Meyer was named superintendent. By 1952 the facility covered 1,185 acres (4.80 km^{2}), including 85 acres (340,000 m^{2}) of gardens, 64 acres (260,000 m^{2}) of orchards, and pasture for the 223 dairy cattle. The resident population was 1,968 people with 310 employees.

Following Meyer's retirement Alfred Sasser was appointed superintendent. Sasser arrived in 1957 and soon changed the facility forever. In September 1957 the new superintendent hosted "State School Day" and opened the campus to the public during the dedication of the Meyer School Building. Controversy soon developed after it was revealed in the November 17, 1957 Des Moines Register that resident Mayo Buckner with a 120 I.Q. had spent 59 years confined to the facility. Further attention was placed on Glenwood by an article on the facility in the Time magazine and the March 1958 issue of Life magazine. The Life article included photographs of the "side room" closets where those who supposedly misbehaved were forced to remain naked while a light-bulb burned 24 hours a day. The aroused business community of Glenwood responded by revealing that Sasser had lied on his application about having attained a doctorate degree. Sasser resigned in March 1959 and the subject of his tenure at Glenwood was dramatized on television during a December 1959 episode of the Armstrong Circle Theatre.

Dr. Peter Peffer served as superintendent at the Glenwood State-Hospital School from 1959 until 1961. Dr. J. Cromwell served as acting superintendent until 1964 when Dr. Leonard Lavis was appointed who in turn resigned in 1969 and was replaced by Dr. William Campbell. Under Campbell, traditional ward-style housing was replaced by individual cottages and the Glenwood State-Hospital School lost much of its institutional character. Staffing was also greatly expanded during the 1970s and Local 29991 of AFSCME was organized.

Early this century the facility was renamed the Glenwood Resource Center. The resident population numbered almost 400 people with close to 850 employees.

== Controversy, Investigation, and Human Experimentation ==
The Glenwood Resource Center has conducted dangerous experimentation on residents, including an experiment that involved overhydrating eight residents as part of a pneumonia study. The center has additionally conducted experiments on sexual arousal on residents, with email records indicating that the previous Division Administrator for Mental Health and Disability Services at DHS signed off on the proposed sexual arousal studies. In addition to controversy regarding human experimentation, Glenwood Resource Center has been criticized due to history of neglect of residents, including an instance in 2018 where 5 former employees were sentenced with resident abuse.

== Sources ==
- Department of Justice: Conditions at Glenwood Resource Center violated Constitution
- Gov. Reynolds grilled on Glenwood Resource Center
- Judge sentences ex-Iowa workers accused of resident abuse
- The Great IQ Wars
- Story of Mayo Buckner
- Mayo Buckner's death notice
- Iowa House of Representatives resolution apologizing for sterilization at Glenwood
- 1901 biographical information on Dr. George Mogridge
- 1909 information on the IIFMC and other Iowa institutions
- 1927 overview of Iowa institutions, including the IIFMC

== Further resources ==
- Hawbaker, B. W. (1998). "Conflict and change at the Glenwood State School". Iowa Heritage Illustrated, 79 (2), 62–88.
