= MCSD =

U.S. school districts:

- Malvern Community School District, a former school district headquartered in Malvern, Iowa
- Martin County School District, a Florida school district headquartered in Stuart
- Marshalltown Community School District, an Iowa school district headquartered in Marshalltown
- Merced City School District, a California school district headquartered in Merced
- Muscatine Community School District, an Iowa school district headquartered in Muscatine
- Muscogee County School District, the county government agency which operates the public schools of Muscogee County, Georgia
- Monticello Central School District, a New York school district headquartered in Monticello
- Murray City School District, a Utah school district headquartered in Murray

Other:

- Mathematical and Computational Sciences Division
- Member of the Chartered Society of Designers, a professional body for designers
- Microsoft Certified Solutions Developer, a retired component of the Microsoft Certified Professional Program
