= F. M. Powell =

American physician

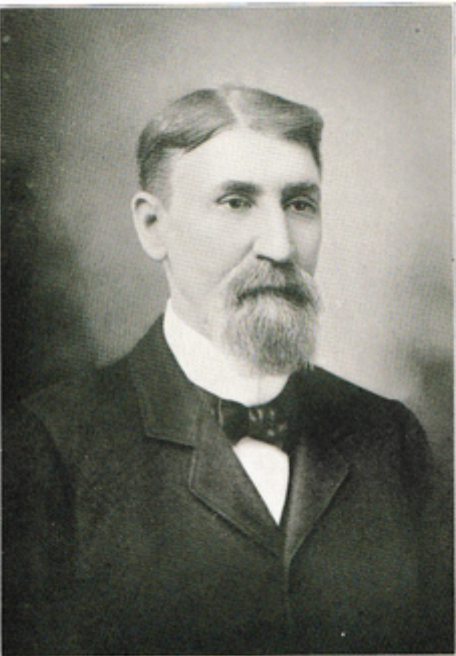
Powell in a 1903 publication.

F. M. Powell (1848-1903) was an American physician. He was the superintendent of the Iowa State Institution for the Feeble Minded.

== Early life and education ==
Francis Marion Powell was born in Morgan County, Ohio, November 12, 1848, being the second child in a family of seven children. In 1857, he removed with his parents to Vernon County, Wisconsin. He attended the common schools of Wisconsin and earned the means that enabled him to attend the Ohio Wesleyan University at Delaware, Ohio , from which institution he graduated.

After graduating, he taught school for a time and at the same time pursued his medical studies. He later entered the Starling Medical College at Columbus, Ohio, graduating with high honors in February 1875.

== Career ==
A month after graduating, he began the practice of medicine at Hastings, Iowa. In the fall of 1881, he removed with his family to Glenwood, Iowa to secure better school privileges for his children.

Powell was a specialist in the consideration of epileptics, and he advocated for their state care.

In 1882, he was appointed superintendent of the state institution for feeble-minded children at Glenwood. When he took charge of the institution, there were less than 200 patients, and the equipment was primitive. The buildings were old and not at all adapted to the needs of the institution. He at once began to build up the institution. He arranged for the erection of modern and well equipped buildings; he conducted a campaign for more money to enable the institution to have the best skill obtainable for the treatment of the state's children with special needs than he had a ever anticipated.

In time, appropriate buildings were added, skilled teachers and nurses were obtained. During all these years, he made a constant study of the treatment and care of special needs children. He attended meetings in all parts of the country where the subject was likely to be treated. He placed himself in touch with the most eminent men in the world in that line, until he, too, became an authority and a recognized leader among the world's specialists in the treatment of special needs children. Ill health caused him to resign.

For some years, it was known that his health was poor, but his retirement was a surprise to the members of the state board of control, when on March 3, 1903, a letter reached Des Moines, Iowa in which he asked to be relieved of the duties of superintendent on July 1. His reason assigned, poor health, was evidently so well founded and he was so determined in his request that in due time the board appointed Dr. George Morgridge, assistant superintendent, to succeed him.

Since leaving the state institution, Powell associated himself with his daughter, Dr. Velura Powell, in a private sanitarium enterprise at Red Oak, Iowa.

It was due probably more to Powell's efforts than to that of any other man that Glenwood secured from Andrew Carnegie the promise of US$7,000 for the building of the Glenwood Public Library, which is listed on the National Register of Historic Places in Mills County, Iowa.

== Personal life ==
He had two sons and two daughters: Dr. Velura Powell of Red Oak, Mrs. Black of Chicago, Fred E. Powell of Red Oak, and Waldo Powell of Washington state.

Powell had an interest in horticulture, and attended meetings of the Horticulture Society. He planted over 200 acres (81 ha) of apple trees on his property in 1892. There were at least 68 different varieties.

Francis Marion Powell of Red Oak, Iowa, died August 16, 1903, in Chicago, at Mercy hospital of a complication of diseases. Interment was in Glenwood, Iowa.

== Selected works ==
- "School gardens", The Minnesota Horticulturist, volume 30, 1902, pp. 335-343
