= East Mills Community School District =

Public school district in Malvern, Iowa, United States

Coordinates: 41.032208°N 95.463915°W

Location
- Malvern, Iowa Hastings, Iowa Mills County and Montgomery County United States
- Coordinates: 41.032208, -95.463915

District information
- Type: Local school district
- Grades: PK-12
- Established: 2011
- Superintendent: Michael Brown
- Schools: 2
- Budget: $8,833,000 (2020-21)
- NCES District ID: 1918240

Students and staff
- Students: 447 (2022-23)
- Teachers: 33.84 FTE
- Staff: 47.01 FTE
- Student–teacher ratio: 13.21
- Athletic conference: Corner Conference
- District mascot: Wolverine
- Colors: Green, Silver and Black

Other information
- Website: www.emschools.org

East Mills Community School District or East Mills Schools is a rural public school district headquartered in Malvern, Iowa, United States. The district is mostly in Mills County, with small portions in Montgomery County. It serves the communities of Hastings, Emerson, Henderson, and Malvern.

== History ==
East Mills Schools officially formed on July 1, 2011, from the merger of the Malvern Community School District and the Nishna Valley Community School District. Voters in both districts approved the consolidation on a 6 to 1 basis in 2010; 19.2% of the registered voters in the districts, a total of 483 people, participated in that election. The merger actually took place years earlier with the first class of East Mills graduating May 2008. The merger occurred to help both struggling districts combine assets and resources. Years prior to the mergers each school district participated in grade-sharing through both campuses.

In 2014, the district had a total of 494 students.

It previously operated Chantry Elementary School in Malvern, but the district closed the school in 2014.

The Hastings campus closed as a grade school in the summer of 2024, with all students, Pre-K through 12th grade, attending classes in the same Malvern campus that previously served only as the Jr.-Sr. East Mills High School.

== Schools ==
The district operates two buildings. One PK-12 school is at the Malvern Campus, and a Career and Technical Educational Hub named SWITCH (Southwest Iowa Technical Career Hub) at the Hastings Campus.

- East Mills Community School District, PK-12 Campus
- SWITCH - Southwest Iowa Technical Career Hub, a non-profit founded in August 2022

=== East Mills High School ===
==== Athletics ====
The Wolverines compete in the Corner Conference in the following sports:

- Cross Country (boys and girls)
- Volleyball
- Football
- Basketball (boys and girls)
- Wrestling (boys and girls)
- Track and Field (boys and girls)
- Baseball
- Softball

== See also ==
- List of school districts in Iowa
- List of high schools in Iowa
