= Silver Creek Township, Mills County, Iowa =

Township in Mills County, Iowa, U.S.

Coordinates: 41.0319°N 95.5853°W

Silver Creek Township is a township in Mills County, Iowa, United States.

== History ==
When Mills County was formed in 1851, retention of the minutes and recording of official acts was overlooked. So early county records are incomplete. The retained documents begin in March 1853, with five townships already organized and in existence: West Liberty Township, Plattville Township, Rawles Township, Council Bluffs Township, and Silver Creek Township. The township was partitioned on 27 February 1855 to form Ingraham Township. But the organization was rescinded. Eventually, on 16 February 1857 Ingraham Township was created.

On 6 July 1880, Malvern Township was partitioned from Silver Creek Township, consisting of all land within the City of Malvern. Silver Creek Township thereafter consisted of all township land without – outside of the city – on 6 July 1880. The contemporary editors of a 1881 Mills County history considered the partition a foolish idea.
