= Glenwood Community School District =

Public school district in Glenwood, Iowa, United States

Location
- Glenwood, Iowa Mills County and Pottawattamie County United States
- Coordinates: 41°02′22″N 95°44′15″W

District information
- Type: Local school district
- Grades: K-12
- Superintendent: Nicole Kooiker
- Schools: 4
- Budget: $29,544,000 (2020-21)
- NCES District ID: 1912690

Students and staff
- Students: 2071 (2022-23)
- Teachers: 129.57 FTE
- Staff: 157.48 FTE
- Student–teacher ratio: 15.98
- Athletic conference: Hawkeye 10
- District mascot: Rams
- Colors: Black and Gold

Other information
- Website: www.glenwoodschools.org

The Glenwood Community School District is a rural public school district based in Glenwood, Iowa. The district is mainly in western Mills County, on the western border of Iowa, with a very small area in southern Pottawattamie County. The district serves the towns of Glenwood, Pacific Junction, and Silver City, the unincorporated village of Mineola, and the surrounding rural areas,

The school's mascot is the Rams. Their colors are black and gold.

== Schools ==
The district operates four schools, all in Glenwood:

- Northeast Elementary School
- West Elementary School
- Glenwood Middle School
- Glenwood Senior High School

== Glenwood High School ==
=== Athletics ===
The Rams compete in the Hawkeye 10 Conference in the following sports:

==== Fall Sports ====
- Football
- Cross Country (boys and girls)
- Volleyball

==== Winter Sports ====
- Boys Basketball
  - 2018 Class 3A State Champions
- Girls Basketball
- Wrestling

==== Spring Sports ====
- Golf (boys and girls)
- Soccer (boys and girls)
- Tennis (boys and girls)
- Track and Field (boys and girls)

==== Summer Sports ====
- Baseball
  - 2010 Class 3A State Champions
- Softball

== See also ==
- List of school districts in Iowa
- List of high schools in Iowa
