= Mills County Courthouse =

Mills County Courthouse may refer to:

- Mills County Courthouse (Iowa)
- Mills County Courthouse (Texas)
