= Deer Creek Township, Mills County, Iowa =

Township in Mills County, Iowa, U.S.

Coordinates: 40°57′N 95°26′W

Deer Creek Township also known as Township No. Seventy One (71) is a township in Mills County, Iowa, United States. Deer Creek Township was created by the subdivision of the White Cloud Civil Township at a meeting of the Board of Supervisors held in the courthouse of Glenwood, Iowa, on the 5th of September in 1871. Deer Creek Township had a population of 220 people on territory of 35.5 square miles with numbered 101 households, as of the 2020 US census. The township is located along U.S. Route 59 in Iowa.

== History ==
The first election in Deer Creek Township was held at the house of Stephen Woodow on 10 October 1871. D. M. Mitchell was the first auditor and clerk in Deer Creek Township. Deer Creek Township was signed by B.F. Buffington, and D.M. Whitefield, members of the board of supervisors.

Dan Solomon is among the first people in Deer Creek Township that opened a farm known as Scott Farm.
