= Ingraham Township, Mills County, Iowa =

Township in Mills County, Iowa, U.S.

Coordinates: 41.1089°N 95.6175°W

Ingraham Township is a township in Mills County, Iowa, United States.

== History ==
Ingraham Township was organized on 27 February 1855 from a partition of Silver Creek Township. But the organization was rescinded. Eventually, on 16 February 1857 Ingraham Township was created.
