= White Cloud Township, Mills County, Iowa =

Township in Mills County, Iowa, U.S.

Coordinates: 40.9497°N 95.5475°W

White Cloud Township is a township in Mills County, Iowa, United States.

== History ==
White Cloud Township was organized in 1856.
