= Malvern, Iowa =

- City
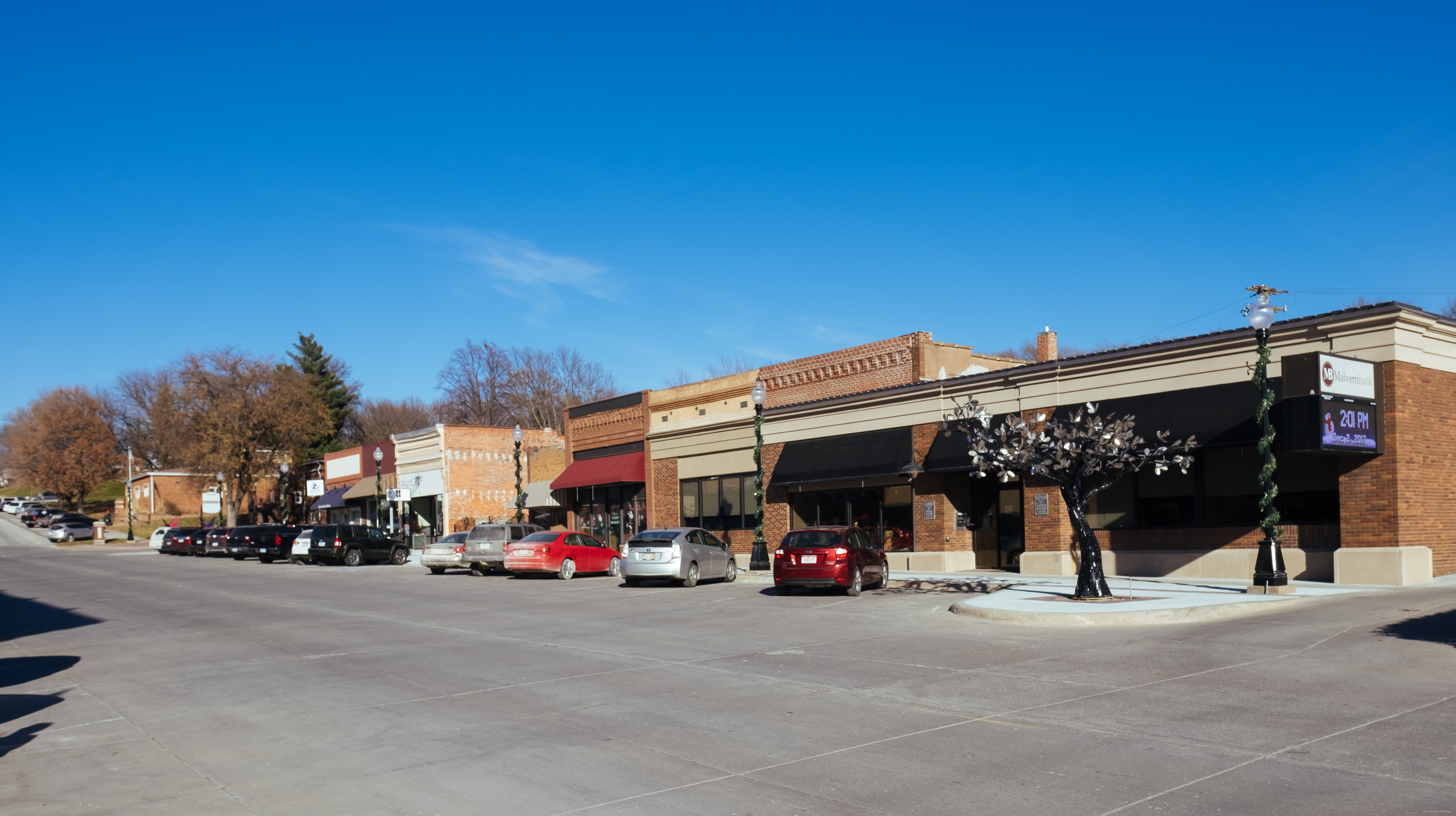
- Main Street

- Location of Malvern, Iowa
- Coordinates: 41°00′07″N 95°34′58″W
- Country: USA
- State: Iowa
- County: Mills

Area
  - Total: 1.59 sq mi (4.13 km^{2})
  - Land: 1.59 sq mi (4.13 km^{2})
  - Water: 0 sq mi (0.00 km^{2})
- Elevation: 1,034 ft (315 m)

Population (2020)
  - Total: 1,046
  - Density: 656.3/sq mi (253.39/km^{2})
- Time zone: UTC-6 (Central (CST))
  - Summer (DST): UTC-5 (CDT)
- ZIP code: 51551
- Area code: 712
- FIPS code: 19-48720
- GNIS feature ID: 468337
- Website: www.malvernia.com

Malvern is a city in Mills County, Iowa, United States. The population was 1,046 at the time of the 2020 census. The Wabash Trace—a railroad converted to a bicycle trail—passes through Malvern. The Mills County Fair is held here, although Glenwood is the county seat. Malvern is the largest town in the eastern half of the county.

== History ==
The pioneer village of Milton was established in the fall of 1869 in Silver Creek Township. It was later renamed Malvern when it was discovered that there was already another Milton, Iowa. It was one of four communities in the area that came into existence with the completion of the Burlington and Missouri River Railroad on November 18, 1869.

John D. Paddock and his bride were the first residents of Malvern. They arrived in September and put up a small 1 1/2-story building that served as their home and the community's first store.

The completion of the railroad soon brought a flood of new residents and business enterprises. White Cloud, a town of perhaps 200 persons and a variety of businesses, was located about where the present Wabash Trace Nature Trail crosses the Nishnabotna River three miles southeast of Malvern. It soon closed down when the new railroad was built two miles north. Several business enterprises and White Cloud residents moved to Malvern.

Malvern grew almost explosively in its first two years. In its fifth year, Mr. Paddock reported in his "Brief History of Malvern", it had a population of 800. It served a particularly productive farming area. It soon had a number of factories, including a hog packing plant, an electric generation plant (in 1892) which permitted a municipal water system, In 1880, Silver Creek Township was partitioned, which created Malvern Township containing all land within the town, so economic investment could be concentrated within the community, without burdening the surrounding Silver Creek Township farmers. Malvern started a school system in 1870, a county fair in 1873, a Chautauqua in 1905, built the town library in 1916 and the present Liberty Memorial Community Building in 1926. In the early part of the twentieth century, a varied poultry industry developed that at one time furnished employment for up to 200 persons.

When the “good roads” movement came to Iowa, the town was omitted from Highway 34, causing some economic stress. At the time it also had the Wabash and Tabor & Northern Railroads, which were also having some economic stress. The town experienced additional stress in the 1950s when much of Iowa's poultry industry moved to Arkansas.

The success of the Malvern community has always been linked to agriculture in many ways. When fewer family farms and farm workers, became the norm, in the 1960s, 1970s, and especially the difficult 1980s, the economy of Malvern suffered as well, losing many of the established businesses that had so long lined the streets in this community.

Today Malvern is a rural community with a golf course, swimming pool, new library and Carnegie Conference Center, agricultural businesses and government offices, a bank, physician's offices, Mills County Fair Grounds, the Wabash Trace Nature Trail, and numerous other businesses.

== Geography ==
According to the United States Census Bureau, the city has a total area of 1.19 square miles (3.08 km^{2}), all land.

== Demographics ==
Historical populations
| Year | Pop. | ±% |
|---|---|---|
| 1880 | 748 | — |
| 1890 | 1,003 | +34.1% |
| 1900 | 1,166 | +16.3% |
| 1910 | 1,154 | −1.0% |
| 1920 | 1,195 | +3.6% |
| 1930 | 1,320 | +10.5% |
| 1940 | 1,325 | +0.4% |
| 1950 | 1,263 | −4.7% |
| 1960 | 1,193 | −5.5% |
| 1970 | 1,158 | −2.9% |
| 1980 | 1,244 | +7.4% |
| 1990 | 1,210 | −2.7% |
| 2000 | 1,256 | +3.8% |
| 2010 | 1,142 | −9.1% |
| 2020 | 1,046 | −8.4% |
Source:"U.S. Census website". United States Census Bureau. and Iowa Data Center; Source: U.S. Decennial Census

=== 2020 census ===
As of the 2020 census, Malvern had a population of 1,046, with 423 households and 275 families residing in the city. The population density was 656.3 inhabitants per square mile (253.4/km^{2}). There were 474 housing units at an average density of 297.4 per square mile (114.8/km^{2}), of which 10.8% were vacant. The homeowner vacancy rate was 6.5% and the rental vacancy rate was 9.5%.

The median age in the city was 39.3 years. 23.8% of residents were under the age of 18 and 18.3% were 65 years of age or older. 26.3% of residents were under the age of 20; 5.7% were between the ages of 20 and 24; 24.7% were from 25 to 44; 25.0% were from 45 to 64; and 18.3% were 65 years of age or older. For every 100 females there were 93.0 males, and for every 100 females age 18 and over there were 93.4 males age 18 and over. The gender makeup of the city was 48.2% male and 51.8% female.

There were 423 households, of which 30.0% had children under the age of 18 living with them. Of all households, 46.1% were married-couple households, 9.2% were cohabiting-couple households, 17.0% had a male householder with no spouse or partner present, and 27.7% had a female householder with no spouse or partner present. 35.0% of all households were non-families; 26.7% were made up of individuals; and 13.2% had someone living alone who was 65 years of age or older.

0.0% of residents lived in urban areas, while 100.0% lived in rural areas.

Racial composition as of the 2020 census
| Race | Number | Percent |
|---|---|---|
| White | 989 | 94.6% |
| Black or African American | 1 | 0.1% |
| American Indian and Alaska Native | 0 | 0.0% |
| Asian | 3 | 0.3% |
| Native Hawaiian and Other Pacific Islander | 1 | 0.1% |
| Some other race | 12 | 1.1% |
| Two or more races | 40 | 3.8% |
| Hispanic or Latino (of any race) | 23 | 2.2% |

=== 2010 census ===
As of the census of 2010, there were 1,142 people, 436 households, and 301 families living in the city. The population density was 959.7 inhabitants per square mile (370.5/km^{2}). There were 499 housing units at an average density of 419.3 per square mile (161.9/km^{2}). The racial makeup of the city was 97.7% White, 0.3% African American, 0.4% Native American, 0.2% Asian, 0.1% from other races, and 1.3% from two or more races. Hispanic or Latino of any race were 0.8% of the population.

There were 436 households, of which 34.2% had children under the age of 18 living with them, 50.0% were married couples living together, 13.5% had a female householder with no husband present, 5.5% had a male householder with no wife present, and 31.0% were non-families. 27.5% of all households were made up of individuals, and 11% had someone living alone who was 65 years of age or older. The average household size was 2.49 and the average family size was 3.04.

The median age in the city was 40.3 years. 25.8% of residents were under the age of 18; 6.9% were between the ages of 18 and 24; 22.2% were from 25 to 44; 29.9% were from 45 to 64; and 15.3% were 65 years of age or older. The gender makeup of the city was 47.4% male and 52.6% female.

=== 2000 census ===
As of the census of 2000, there were 1,256 people, 474 households, and 320 families living in the city. The population density was 1,053.1 inhabitants per square mile (406.6/km^{2}). There were 503 housing units at an average density of 421.8 per square mile (162.9/km^{2}). The racial makeup of the city was 98.73% White, 0.08% African American, 0.08% Native American, 0.08% Asian, and 1.04% from two or more races. Hispanic or Latino of any race were 0.40% of the population.

There were 474 households, out of which 31.6% had children under the age of 18 living with them, 55.5% were married couples living together, 8.9% had a female householder with no husband present, and 32.3% were non-families. 28.9% of all households were made up of individuals, and 16.9% had someone living alone who was 65 years of age or older. The average household size was 2.49 and the average family size was 3.08.

Population spread: 26.5% under the age of 18, 6.0% from 18 to 24, 24.1% from 25 to 44, 23.3% from 45 to 64, and 20.1% who were 65 years of age or older. The median age was 40 years. For every 100 females, there were 90.6 males. For every 100 females age 18 and over, there were 88.8 males.

The median income for a household in the city was $33,182, and the median income for a family was $44,432. Males had a median income of $29,185 versus $22,266 for females. The per capita income for the city was $15,553. About 7.1% of families and 11.2% of the population were below the poverty line, including 9.0% of those under age 18 and 13.4% of those age 65 or over.

== Education ==
The community is within the East Mills Community School District. From July 1, 1960, it was in the Malvern Community School District until July 1, 2011, when it merged to form the East Mills district. The Malvern and East Mills districts operated Chantry Elementary School in Malvern, but the latter closed the school in 2014.
