= Nishna Valley Community School District =

Defunct school district in Iowa, United States

Nishna Valley Community School District was a school district headquartered in Hastings, Iowa. In its final days it operated Nishna Valley Elementary School and East Mills Middle School.

It formed on July 1, 1960. It went into a legal dispute with the Malvern Community School District over the possession of portions of the former Benton, Golden Hill, and Wearin school districts.

Circa 2007 it began a whole grade-sharing arrangement with the Malvern district in which children from both districts attended each other's schools in order to save money. East Mills High School was the consolidated high school of these districts.

On July 1, 2011, it merged with Malvern to form the East Mills Community School District. Voters in both districts approved the consolidation on a 6 to 1 basis in 2010; 19.2% of the registered voters in the districts, a total of 483 people, participated in that election.
