= Mills County Courthouse (Iowa) =

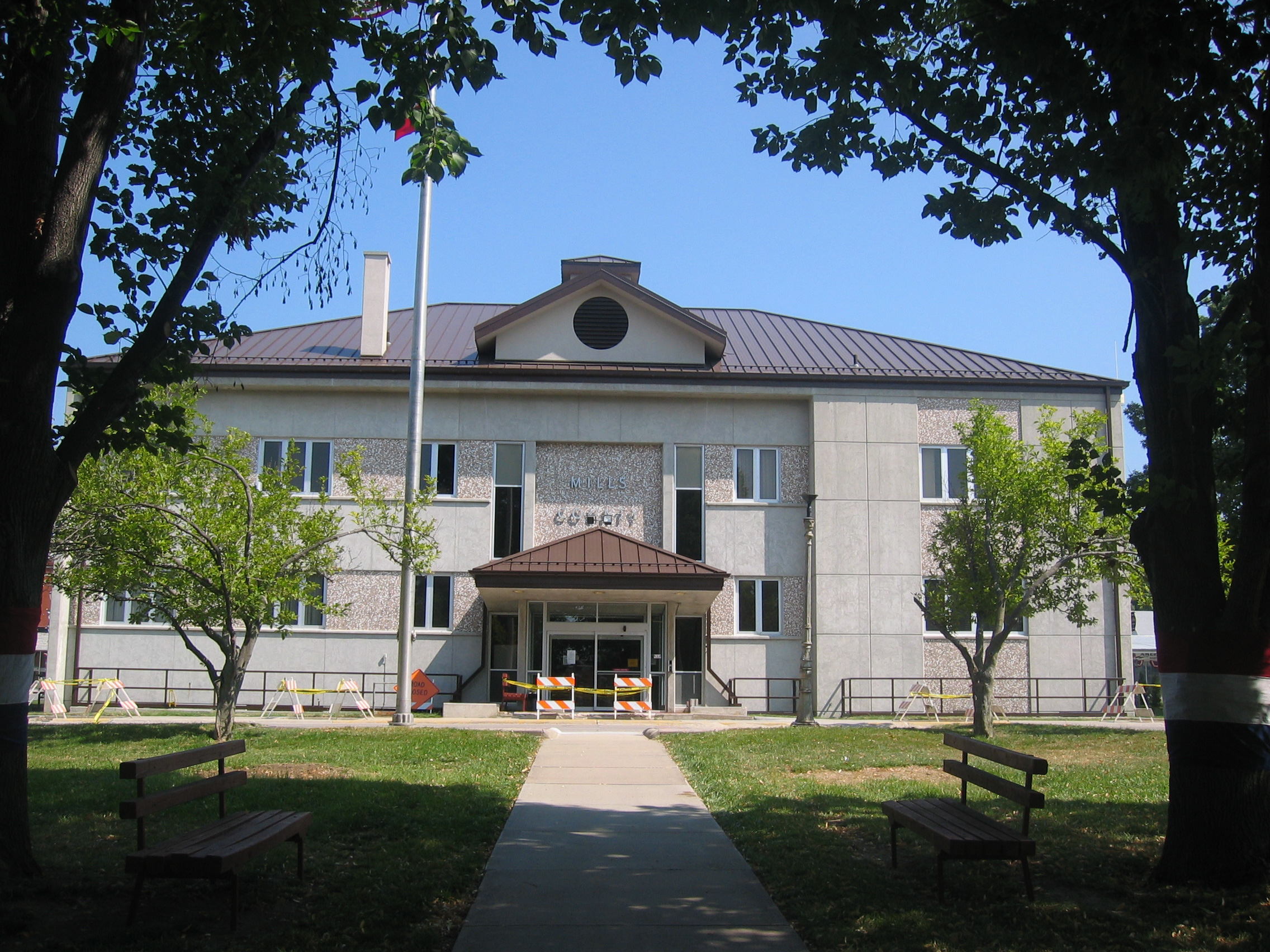
- Mills County Courthouse
- Interactive map of the Mills County Courthouse area

General information
- Type: Courthouse
- Architectural style: Modern
- Location: 418 E. Sharp St., Glenwood, Iowa, United States
- Coordinates: 41.047084°N 95.742521°W
- Construction started: 1958
- Completed: May 19, 1959

Technical details
- Floor count: Two

Design and construction
- Architecture firm: B.H. Backlund and Associates
- Main contractor: Butler Construction Co.

The Mills County Courthouse is located in Glenwood, Iowa, United States. It is the second building the county has used for a courthouse and county business.

== History ==
Glenwood was named the county seat when Mills County was organized in 1851, but it was called Coonville at the time. The first courthouse was a two-story brick structure with a tin roof that was completed in 1857. It measured 50 by 45 feet (15 by 14 m). County offices were located on the main floor and the courtroom with its 20 feet (6.1 m) ceiling was located on the second floor. The courtroom was used for various public events in addition to court sessions. In 1910 an addition was built by W.S. Doan.

The present courthouse was begun in 1958 and completed the following year for $319,038.09. It is a two-story concrete and glass structure designed by B.H. Backlund and Associates and built by Butler Construction Co. The main entrance is in a small glass-enclosed portico. Colored panels are located between the windows. A metal hipped roof and roof dormers have subsequently been added to the building giving it more of a Post-modern appearance. A Modernist concrete clock tower is located next to the building.
