= Balfour, Iowa =

- Unincorporated community
- Location within Iowa Location within the United States
- Coordinates: 41°02′56″N 95°40′04″W
- Country: United States
- State: Iowa
- County: Mills County
- Elevation: 1,155 ft (352 m)
- Time zone: UTC-6 (Central (CST))
  - Summer (DST): UTC-5 (CDT)
- GNIS feature ID: 464455

Balfour is an unincorporated community in Mills County, in the U.S. state of Iowa.

== Geography ==
Balfour is 4 miles (6.4 km) from the county seat of Glenwood.

== History ==
Balfour was founded in 1902 when the Chicago, Burlington & Quincy Railroad bypassed the small former town of Hillsdale. The new rail line opened in August 1904; Balfour soon had a stockyard, rail station, and general store/post office.

Balfour and another small unincorporated community that was named Hebard, were both declared as "new towns" on the railroad by the Council Bluffs Daily Nonpareil, replacing Hillsdale and Hawthorne, towns now without rail access and saving the C.B.& Q. Railway 6.5 miles (10.5 km) of track, and more importantly to the railway, making the grade less steep.

The grange hall at Hillsdale was moved to Balfour and was dedicated on December 12, 1912.

Balfour's population was 25 in 1920.

By the 1930s, Balfour was being abandoned. The stockyards were used until 1939.

The population was 30 in 1940. The rail station was removed in the 1940s. Today, all that remains in Balfour are a few houses.

== See also ==
- Sciola, Iowa
