= Center Township, Mills County, Iowa =

Township in Mills County, Iowa, U.S.

Coordinates: 41.0233°N 95.6617°W

Center Township is a township in Mills County, Iowa, United States.

== History ==
Center Township was organized in 1879.
