= Indian Creek Township, Mills County, Iowa =

Township in Mills County, Iowa, U.S.

Coordinates: 41.0414°N 95.4700°W

Indian Creek Township is a township in Mills County, Iowa, United States.

== History ==
Indian Creek Township was organized in 1853; it was then known as Montgomery Township. This township was renamed Indian Creek in 1857.
