= Lyons Township, Mills County, Iowa =

Township in Mills County, Iowa, U.S.

Coordinates: 40.9403°N 95.7744°W

Lyons Township is a township in Mills County, Iowa, United States.

== History ==
Lyons Township was organized in 1857.
