= St. Marys Township, Mills County, Iowa =

Township in Iowa, USA

Coordinates: 41°07′N 95°51′W

St. Marys Township is a township in Mills County, Iowa, United States.
