= Silver City, Iowa =

- City
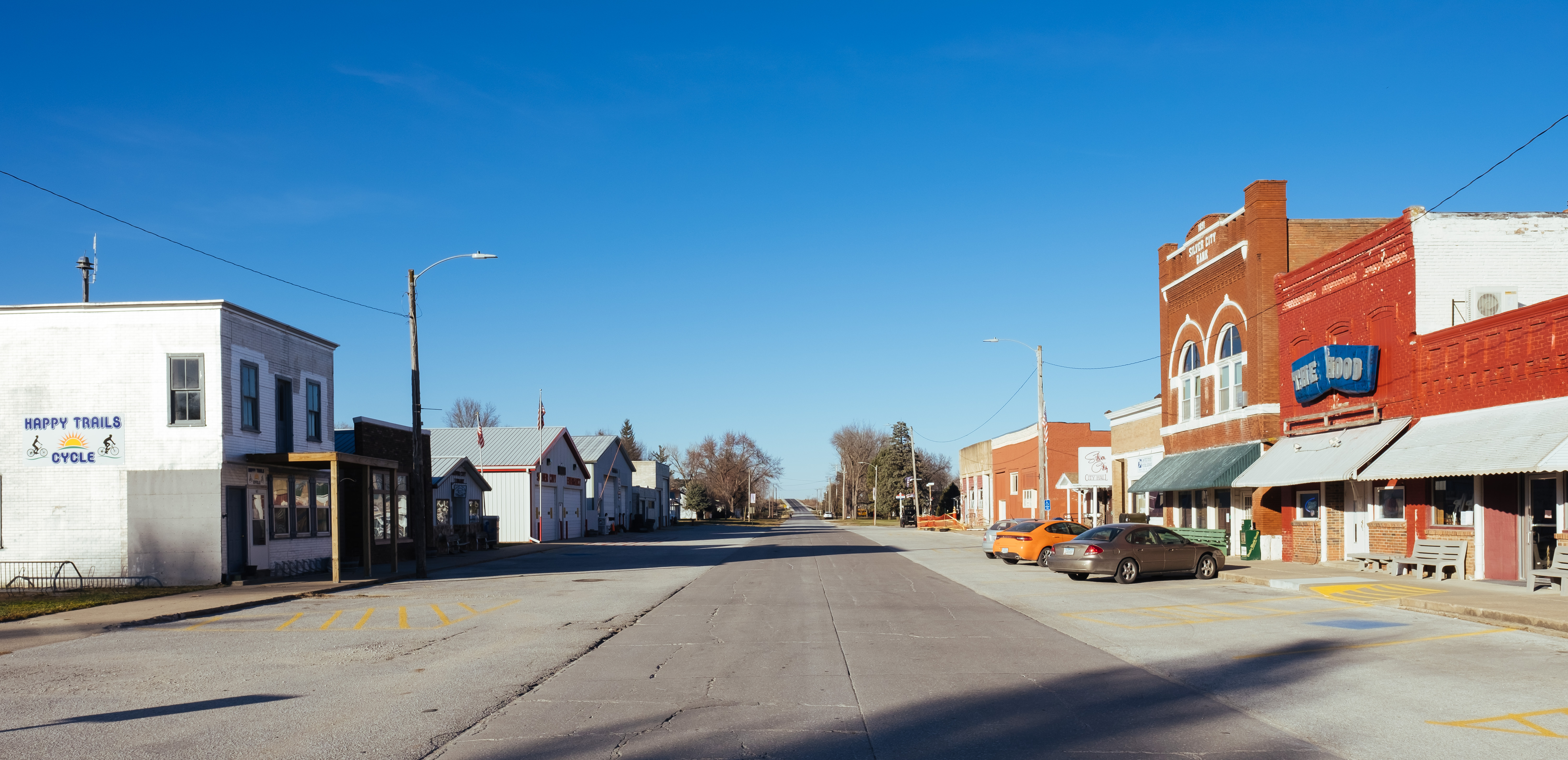
- Downtown Silver City

- Location of Silver City, Iowa
- Coordinates: 41°06′41″N 95°38′16″W
- Country: USA
- State: Iowa
- County: Mills

Government
  - Mayor: Joseph Jaworski

Area
  - Total: 0.21 sq mi (0.54 km^{2})
  - Land: 0.21 sq mi (0.54 km^{2})
  - Water: 0 sq mi (0.00 km^{2})
- Elevation: 1,050 ft (320 m)

Population (2020)
  - Total: 245
  - Density: 1,170.8/sq mi (452.03/km^{2})
- Time zone: UTC-6 (Central (CST))
  - Summer (DST): UTC-5 (CDT)
- ZIP code: 51571
- Area code: 712
- FIPS code: 19-73155
- GNIS feature ID: 2395887

Silver City is a city in Mills County, Iowa, United States. The population was 245 at the 2020 census. The Wabash Trace—a railroad converted to a bicycle trail—passes through here.

== History ==
Silver City had its start in the year 1879 by the building of the Wabash, St. Louis and Pacific Railway through that territory.

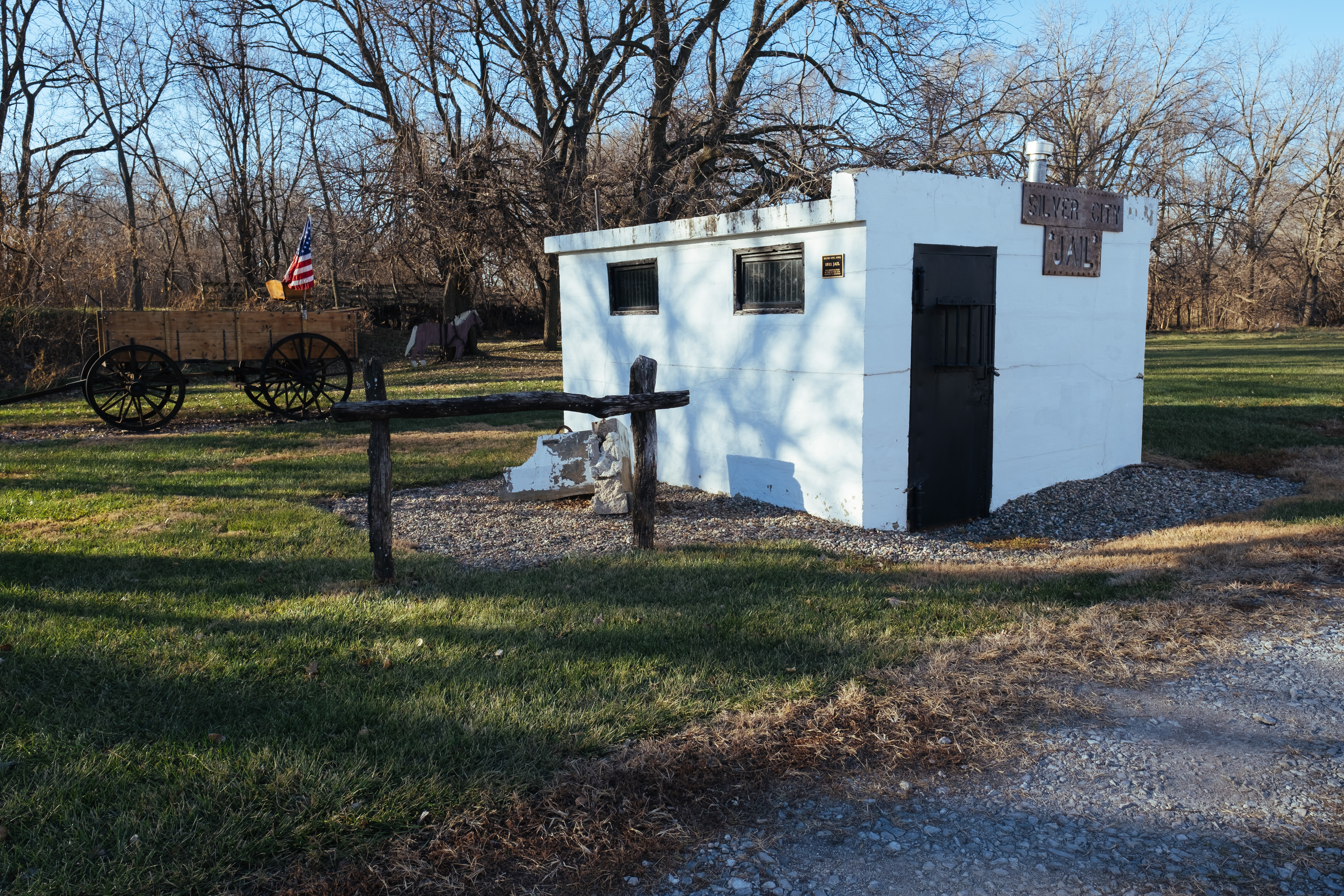
1911 Jail

In its busiest time, Silver City was home to a lumber yard, grocery store, horse racing track, jewelry store, pharmacy and other businesses. An annual carnival would visit as well.

Silver City is currently home to the Loyal Lassies/Ingraham Straight Shooters 4-H club as well as the Silver City Library and historical society. Silver City Volunteer Fire & Rescue services the town and immediate area. Mills County Sheriffs Department provides emergency response and patrol services.

== Geography ==
Silver Creek, the town's namesake and a tributary of the West Nishnabotna River, parallels the eastern city limits. The Wabash Trace Nature Trail, a former rail line, enters the town from the west and runs southeasterly through town, making a southerly turn before meeting Silver Creek.

According to the United States Census Bureau, the city has a total area of 0.22 square miles (0.57 km^{2}), all land.

== Demographics ==
Historical populations
Year	Pop.	±%
1880	185	—
1890	324	+75.1%
1900	438	+35.2%
1910	416	−5.0%
1920	430	+3.4%
1930	355	−17.4%
1940	346	−2.5%
1950	311	−10.1%
1960	281	−9.6%
1970	272	−3.2%
1980	291	+7.0%
1990	252	−13.4%
2000	259	+2.8%
2010	245	−5.4%
2020	245	+0.0%
Source:"U.S. Census website". United States Census Bureau. and Iowa Data Center; Source: U.S. Decennial Census

=== 2020 census ===
As of the census of 2020, there were 245 people, 101 households, and 71 families residing in the city. The population density was 1,170.8 inhabitants per square mile (452.0/km^{2}). There were 108 housing units at an average density of 516.1 per square mile (199.3/km^{2}). The racial makeup of the city was 91.8% White, 0.0% Black or African American, 0.0% Native American, 0.0% Asian, 0.0% Pacific Islander, 0.8% from other races and 7.3% from two or more races. Hispanic or Latino persons of any race comprised 1.6% of the population.

Of the 101 households, 31.7% of which had children under the age of 18 living with them, 54.5% were married couples living together, 5.9% were cohabitating couples, 21.8% had a female householder with no spouse or partner present and 17.8% had a male householder with no spouse or partner present. 29.7% of all households were non-families. 26.7% of all households were made up of individuals, 11.9% had someone living alone who was 65 years old or older.

The median age in the city was 44.4 years. 25.3% of the residents were under the age of 20; 2.4% were between the ages of 20 and 24; 24.1% were from 25 and 44; 26.1% were from 45 and 64; and 22.0% were 65 years of age or older. The gender makeup of the city was 52.7% male and 47.3% female.

=== 2010 census ===
As of the census of 2010, there were 245 people, 104 households, and 79 families living in the city. The population density was 1,113.6 inhabitants per square mile (430.0/km^{2}). There were 116 housing units at an average density of 527.3 per square mile (203.6/km^{2}). The racial makeup of the city was 95.9% White, 0.8% Native American, and 3.3% from two or more races. Hispanic or Latino of any race were 1.2% of the population.

There were 104 households, of which 26.9% had children under the age of 18 living with them, 65.4% were married couples living together, 4.8% had a female householder with no husband present, 5.8% had a male householder with no wife present, and 24.0% were non-families. 21.2% of all households were made up of individuals, and 8.6% had someone living alone who was 65 years of age or older. The average household size was 2.36 and the average family size was 2.67.

The median age in the city was 45.3 years. 19.6% of residents were under the age of 18; 4.4% were between the ages of 18 and 24; 25.3% were from 25 to 44; 33.8% were from 45 to 64; and 16.7% were 65 years of age or older. The gender makeup of the city was 52.7% male and 47.3% female.

=== 2000 census ===
As of the census of 2000, there were 259 people, 110 households, and 80 families living in the city. The population density was 1,202.7 inhabitants per square mile (464.4/km^{2}). There were 111 housing units at an average density of 515.4 per square mile (199.0/km^{2}). The racial makeup of the city was 98.46% White, 0.39% African American, 0.77% from other races, and 0.39% from two or more races. Hispanic or Latino of any race were 0.77% of the population.

There were 110 households, out of which 32.7% had children under the age of 18 living with them, 60.0% were married couples living together, 11.8% had a female householder with no husband present, and 26.4% were non-families. 22.7% of all households were made up of individuals, and 13.6% had someone living alone who was 65 years of age or older. The average household size was 2.35 and the average family size was 2.75.

Population spread: 25.9% under the age of 18, 3.5% from 18 to 24, 29.7% from 25 to 44, 25.5% from 45 to 64, and 15.4% who were 65 years of age or older. The median age was 39 years. For every 100 females, there were 94.7 males. For every 100 females age 18 and over, there were 90.1 males.

The median income for a household in the city was $36,250, and the median income for a family was $43,125. Males had a median income of $29,000 versus $31,071 for females. The per capita income for the city was $14,864. About 3.6% of families and 5.2% of the population were below the poverty line, including none of those under the age of eighteen and 20.5% of those 65 or over.

== Education ==
The city is in the Glenwood Community School District.

== See also ==
- Alpheus Cutler
