= Anderson Township, Mills County, Iowa =

Township in Iowa, USA

Coordinates: 41°07′N 95°28′W

Anderson Township is a township in Mills County, Iowa, United States.
