= Pacific Junction, Iowa =

- City
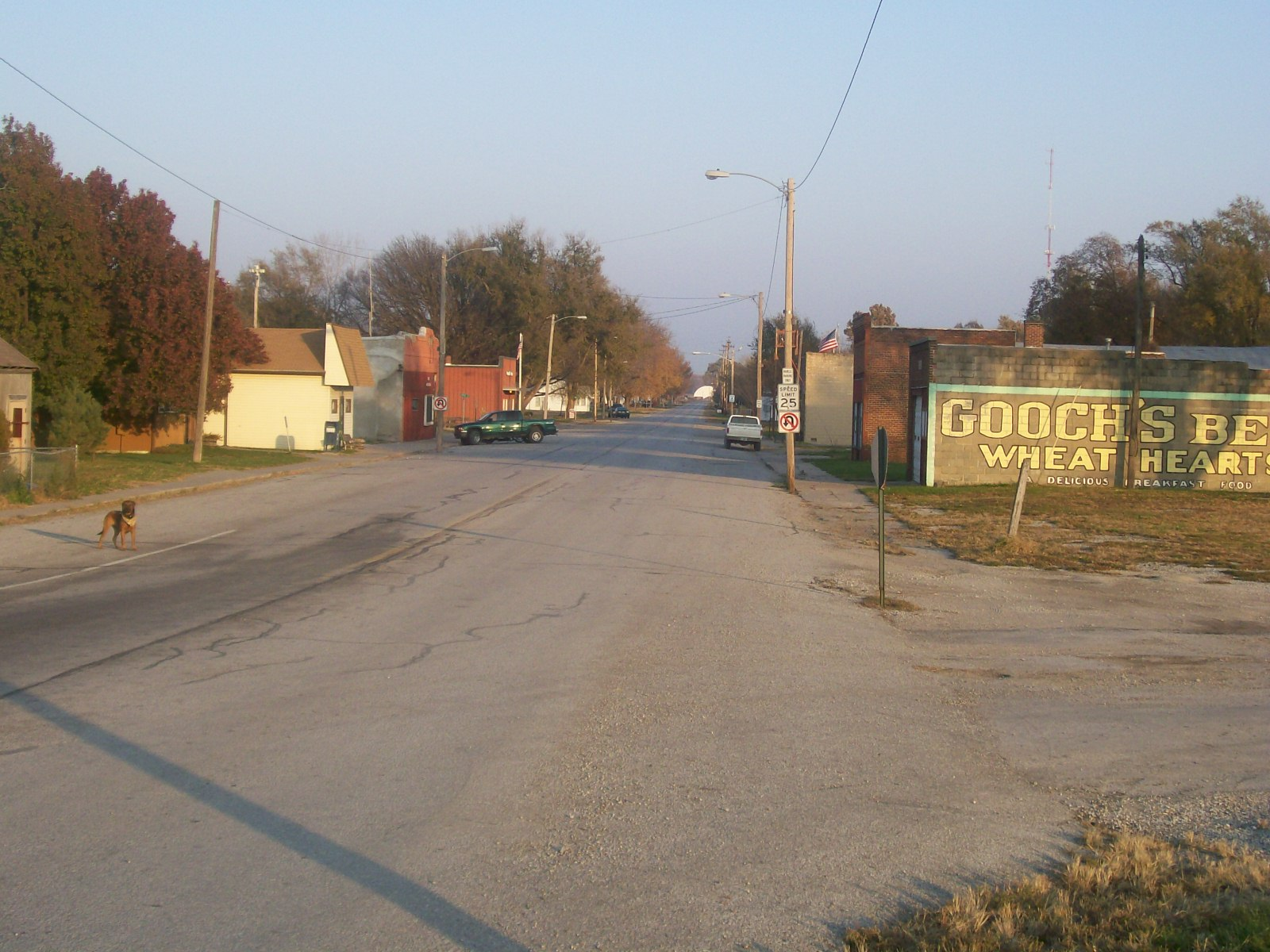
- View of Pacific Junction looking east down Lincoln Avenue from Front Street

- Location of Pacific Junction, Iowa
- Coordinates: 41°01′05″N 95°47′58″W
- Country: US
- State: Iowa
- County: Mills

Area
  - Total: 0.76 sq mi (1.96 km^{2})
  - Land: 0.76 sq mi (1.96 km^{2})
  - Water: 0 sq mi (0.00 km^{2})
- Elevation: 955 ft (291 m)

Population (2020)
  - Total: 96
  - Density: 126.8/sq mi (48.97/km^{2})
- Time zone: UTC-6 (Central (CST))
  - Summer (DST): UTC-5 (CDT)
- ZIP code: 51561
- Area code: 712
- FIPS code: 19-60825
- GNIS feature ID: 2396124

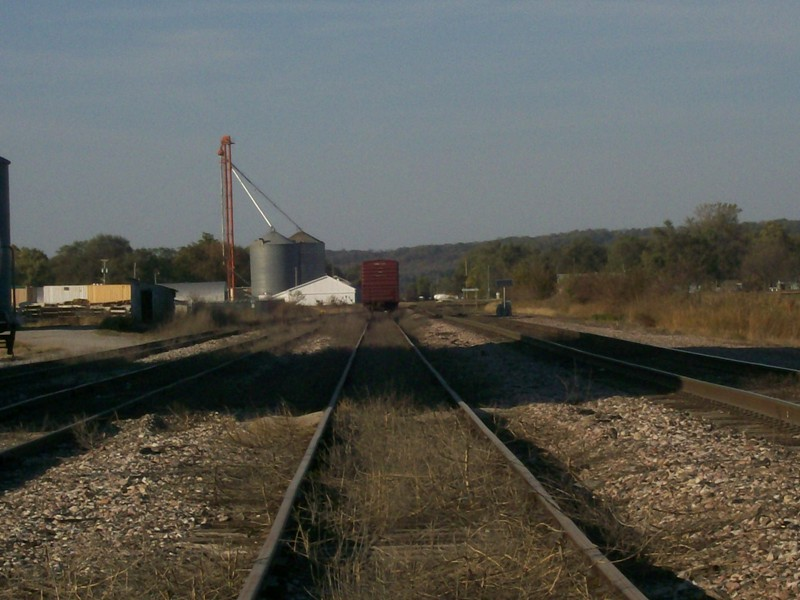
Looking north into Pacific Junction.

Pacific Junction is a city in Mills County, Iowa, United States. The population was 96 at the time of the 2020 census.

== History ==
Pacific Junction was established by the railroad in 1871 to serve as the western terminus of the Burlington and Missouri River Railroad, the eastern terminus of the Nebraska Burlington & Missouri River RR, and a station on the Kansas City, Council Bluffs, & Saint Joseph Railroad. All three were consolidated as part of the Chicago, Burlington and Quincy Railroad, today's BNSF. After several rough and tumble years of growth Pacific Junction was incorporated in 1882. The scene of violence during the Burlington Railroad Strike of 1888, PJ's population peaked during the early 20th century with just over 700 people. Railroad traffic through town remains almost constant although the town's connections to the railroad have declined significantly since 1971. Historic structures include the 1914 Pacific Junction Public School which graduated its last high school class in 1961 and closed for good in 1986. On the early morning of December 3, 2021, two BNSF trains collided two locomotives and 16 cars derailed in Pacific Junction.

The 2019 Midwestern U.S. floods had a devastating impact on Pacific Junction. Following the failing of the Mills County levees on March 17, 2019, the city was flooded completely. Following a federal buyout program and the demolition of damaged structures, most lots now lie empty. The United States Postal Service has yet to return to the town, and the town hall is not currently usable. The city government has struggled financially in the aftermath, and has experienced difficulty in providing services. According to the 2020 Census, only around 20% of the pre-flood population of the city remains.

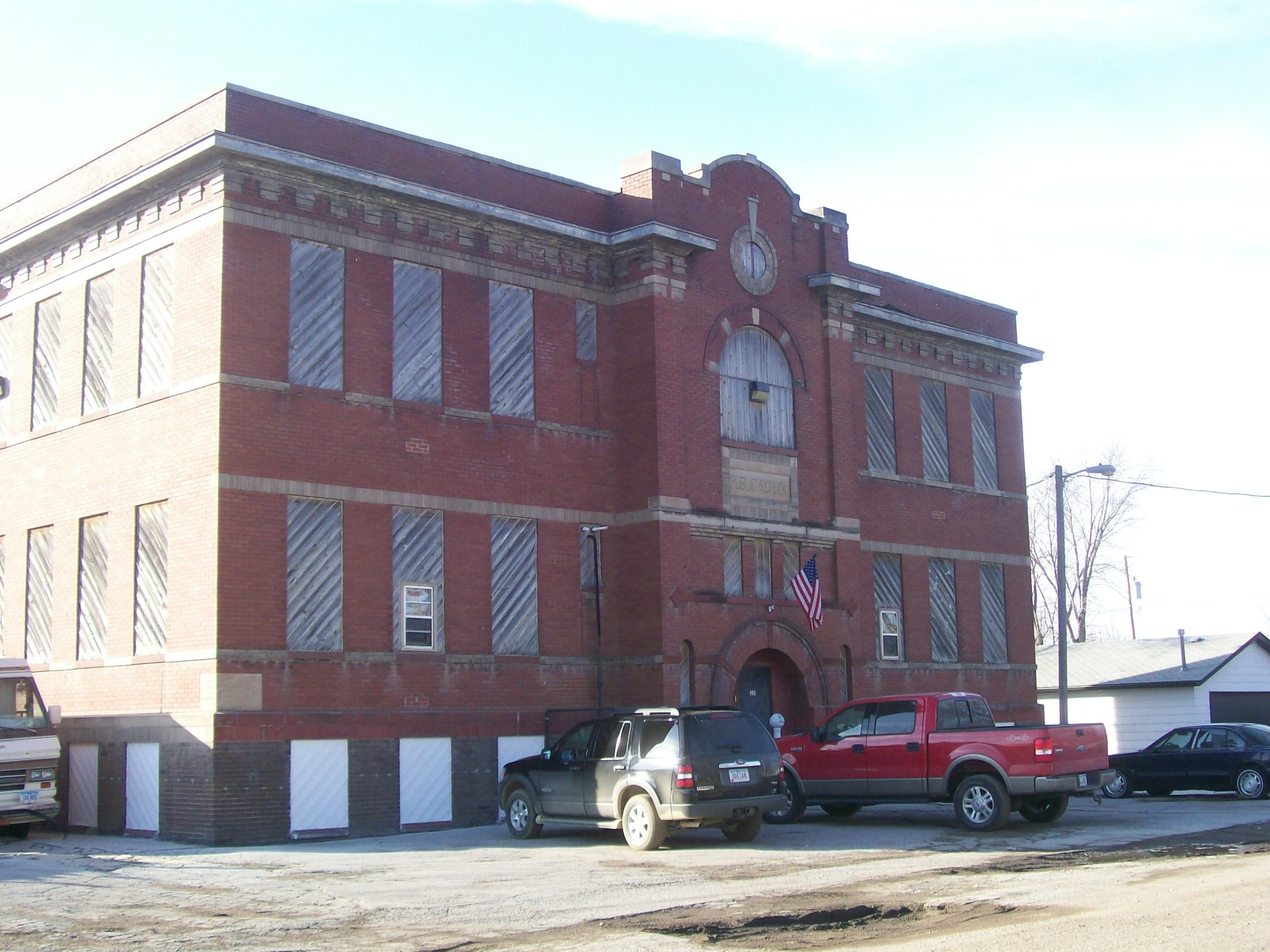
This was the Public School in Pacific Junction and was later the location of a Sitel telemarketing branch.

== Geography ==
According to the United States Census Bureau, the city has a total area of 0.76 square miles (1.97 km^{2}), all land.

== Demographics ==
Historical populations
Year	Pop.	±%
1880	123	—
1890	744	+504.9%
1900	732	−1.6%
1910	501	−31.6%
1920	666	+32.9%
1930	594	−10.8%
1940	558	−6.1%
1950	550	−1.4%
1960	560	+1.8%
1970	505	−9.8%
1980	511	+1.2%
1990	548	+7.2%
2000	507	−7.5%
2010	471	−7.1%
2020	96	−79.6%
Source:"U.S. Census website". United States Census Bureau. and Iowa Data Center; Source: U.S. Decennial Census

=== 2020 census ===
As of the census of 2020, there were 96 people, 41 households, and 33 families residing in the city. The population density was 126.8 inhabitants per square mile (49.0/km^{2}). There were 151 housing units at an average density of 199.5 per square mile (77.0/km^{2}). The racial makeup of the city was 95.8% White, 1.0% Black or African American, 0.0% Native American, 0.0% Asian, 0.0% Pacific Islander, 0.0% from other races and 3.1% from two or more races. Hispanic or Latino persons of any race comprised 0.0% of the population.

Of the 41 households, 26.8% of which had children under the age of 18 living with them, 58.5% were married couples living together, 7.3% were cohabitating couples, 14.6% had a female householder with no spouse or partner present and 19.5% had a male householder with no spouse or partner present. 19.5% of all households were non-families. 17.1% of all households were made up of individuals, 9.8% had someone living alone who was 65 years old or older.

The median age in the city was 52.0 years. 26.0% of the residents were under the age of 20; 0.0% were between the ages of 20 and 24; 15.6% were from 25 and 44; 37.5% were from 45 and 64; and 20.8% were 65 years of age or older. The gender makeup of the city was 50.0% male and 50.0% female.

=== 2010 census ===
As of the census of 2010, there were 471 people, 196 households, and 138 families living in the city. The population density was 619.7 inhabitants per square mile (239.3/km^{2}). There were 208 housing units at an average density of 273.7 per square mile (105.7/km^{2}). The racial makeup of the city was 96.0% White, 0.6% Native American, 0.4% Pacific Islander, 1.3% from other races, and 1.7% from two or more races. Hispanic or Latino of any race were 2.1% of the population.

There were 196 households, of which 24.0% had children under the age of 18 living with them, 54.6% were married couples living together, 9.7% had a female householder with no husband present, 6.1% had a male householder with no wife present, and 29.6% were non-families. 22.4% of all households were made up of individuals, and 10.7% had someone living alone who was 65 years of age or older. The average household size was 2.40 and the average family size was 2.75.

The median age in the city was 45.1 years. 18.3% of residents were under the age of 18; 7.8% were between the ages of 18 and 24; 23.8% were from 25 to 44; 36.5% were from 45 to 64; and 13.6% were 65 years of age or older. The gender makeup of the city was 48.2% male and 51.8% female.

=== 2000 census ===
During the census of 2000, there were 507 people, 196 households, and 148 families living in the city. The population density was 665.0 inhabitants per square mile (256.8/km^{2}). There were 210 housing units at an average density of 275.4 per square mile (106.3/km^{2}). The racial makeup of the city was 96.84% White, 0.20% Native American, 0.59% Asian, 0.39% Pacific Islander, 0.20% from other races, and 1.78% from two or more races. Hispanic or Latino of any race were 0.99% of the population.

There were 196 households, out of which 33.2% had children under the age of 18 living with them, 56.6% were married couples living together, 14.8% had a female householder with no husband present, and 24.0% were non-families. 18.9% of all households were made up of individuals, and 10.2% had someone living alone who was 65 years of age or older. The average household size was 2.59 and the average family size was 2.91.

24.9% are under the age of 18, 9.5% from 18 to 24, 27.2% from 25 to 44, 26.4% from 45 to 64, and 12.0% who were 65 years of age or older. The median age was 39 years. For every 100 females, there were 92.0 males. For every 100 females age 18 and over, there were 86.8 males.

The median income for a household in the city was $36,563, and the median income for a family was $40,333. Males had a median income of $28,750 versus $25,089 for females. The per capita income for the city was $15,103. About 5.6% of families and 7.6% of the population were below the poverty line, including 12.9% of those under age 18 and 2.3% of those age 65 or over.

== Education ==
The city is in the Glenwood Community School District.
