= Chief physician =

Physician in a senior management position

A chief physician (also called head physician, physician in chief, senior consultant, or chief of medicine) is a physician in a senior management position at a hospital or other institution. In many institutions, it is the title of the most senior physician, but it may also be used as the title of the most senior physician of a particular department within a larger institution. A chief physician generally is in charge of medical matters and often is the superior of other physicians (including consultants and attending physicians), but may also be in charge of other professional groups and areas of responsibility.
