= Malvern Community School District =

Former school district in Iowa

Malvern Community School District (MCSD) was a school district headquartered in Malvern, Iowa, USA. It operated Chantry Elementary School and Malvern High School.

It was formed on July 1, 1960. It went into a legal dispute with the Nishna Valley Community School District over the possession of portions of the former Benton, Golden Hill and Wearin school districts.

Circa 2007 it began a "whole grade-sharing" arrangement with the Nishna Valley district in which children from both districts attended each other's schools in order to save money. East Mills High School was the consolidated high school of these districts.

On July 1, 2011, it merged with Nishna Valley to form the East Mills Community School District. Voters in both districts approved the consolidation on a 6 to 1 basis in 2010; 19.2% of the registered voters in the districts, a total of 483 people, participated in that election.
