= Hastings, Iowa =

- City
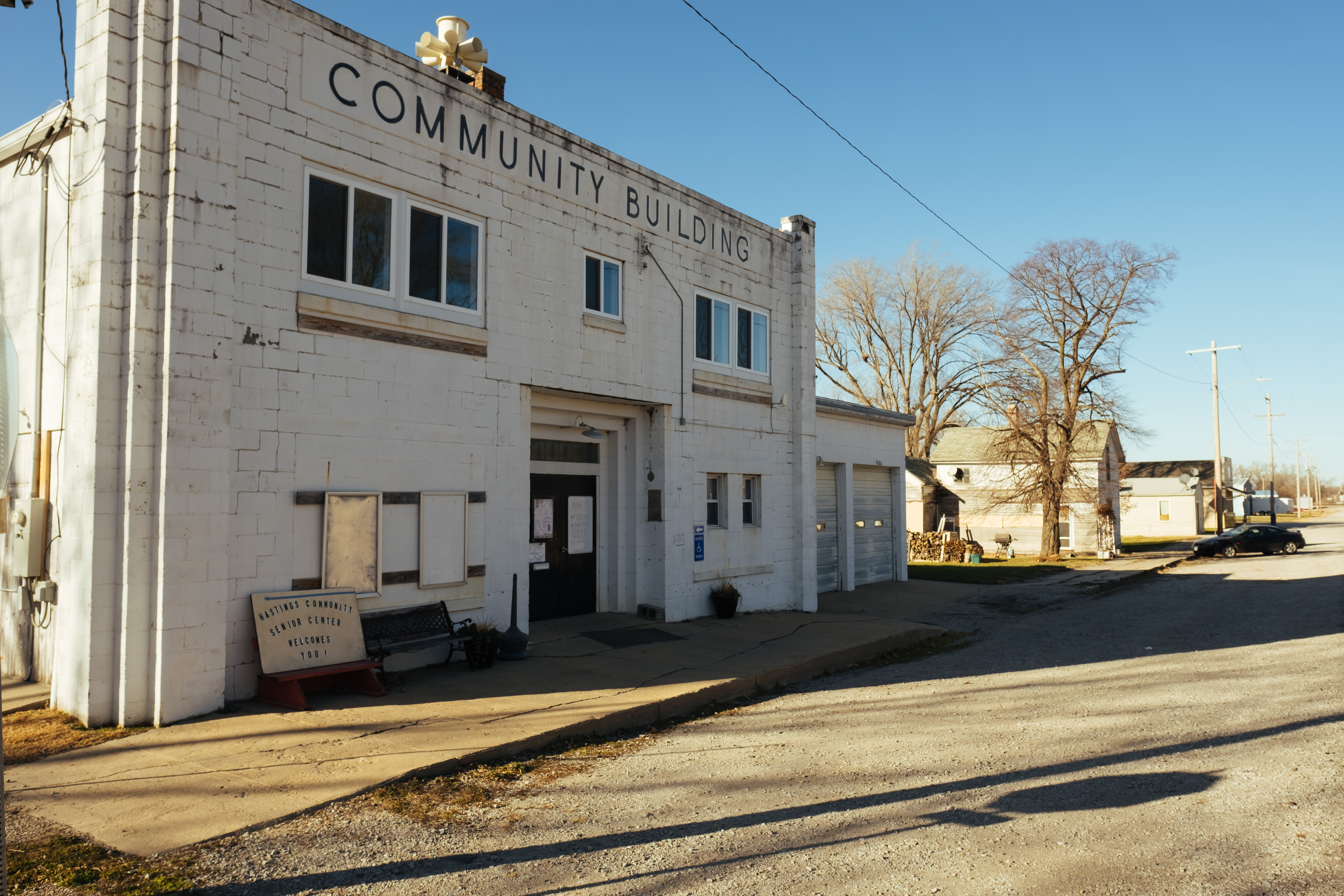
- Hastings Community Building

- Location of Hastings, Iowa
- Coordinates: 41°01′26″N 95°29′50″W
- Country: USA
- State: Iowa
- County: Mills

Area
  - Total: 0.41 sq mi (1.06 km^{2})
  - Land: 0.41 sq mi (1.06 km^{2})
  - Water: 0 sq mi (0.00 km^{2})
- Elevation: 1,034 ft (315 m)

Population (2020)
  - Total: 152
  - Density: 370.6/sq mi (143.09/km^{2})
- Time zone: UTC-6 (Central (CST))
  - Summer (DST): UTC-5 (CDT)
- ZIP code: 51540
- Area code: 712
- FIPS code: 19-34995
- GNIS feature ID: 2394321

Hastings is a city in Mills County, Iowa, United States. The population was 152 at the time of the 2020 census.

== History ==
Hastings got its start in the year 1872, following construction of the Chicago, Burlington and Quincy Railroad through the territory.

== Geography ==
According to the United States Census Bureau, the city has a total area of 0.41 square miles (1.06 km^{2}), all land.

== Demographics ==
Historical populations
Year	Pop.	±%
1880	440	—
1890	322	−26.8%
1900	404	+25.5%
1910	393	−2.7%
1920	424	+7.9%
1930	389	−8.3%
1940	403	+3.6%
1950	308	−23.6%
1960	260	−15.6%
1970	229	−11.9%
1980	215	−6.1%
1990	187	−13.0%
2000	214	+14.4%
2010	152	−29.0%
2020	152	+0.0%
Source:"U.S. Census website". United States Census Bureau. and Iowa Data Center; Source: U.S. Decennial Census

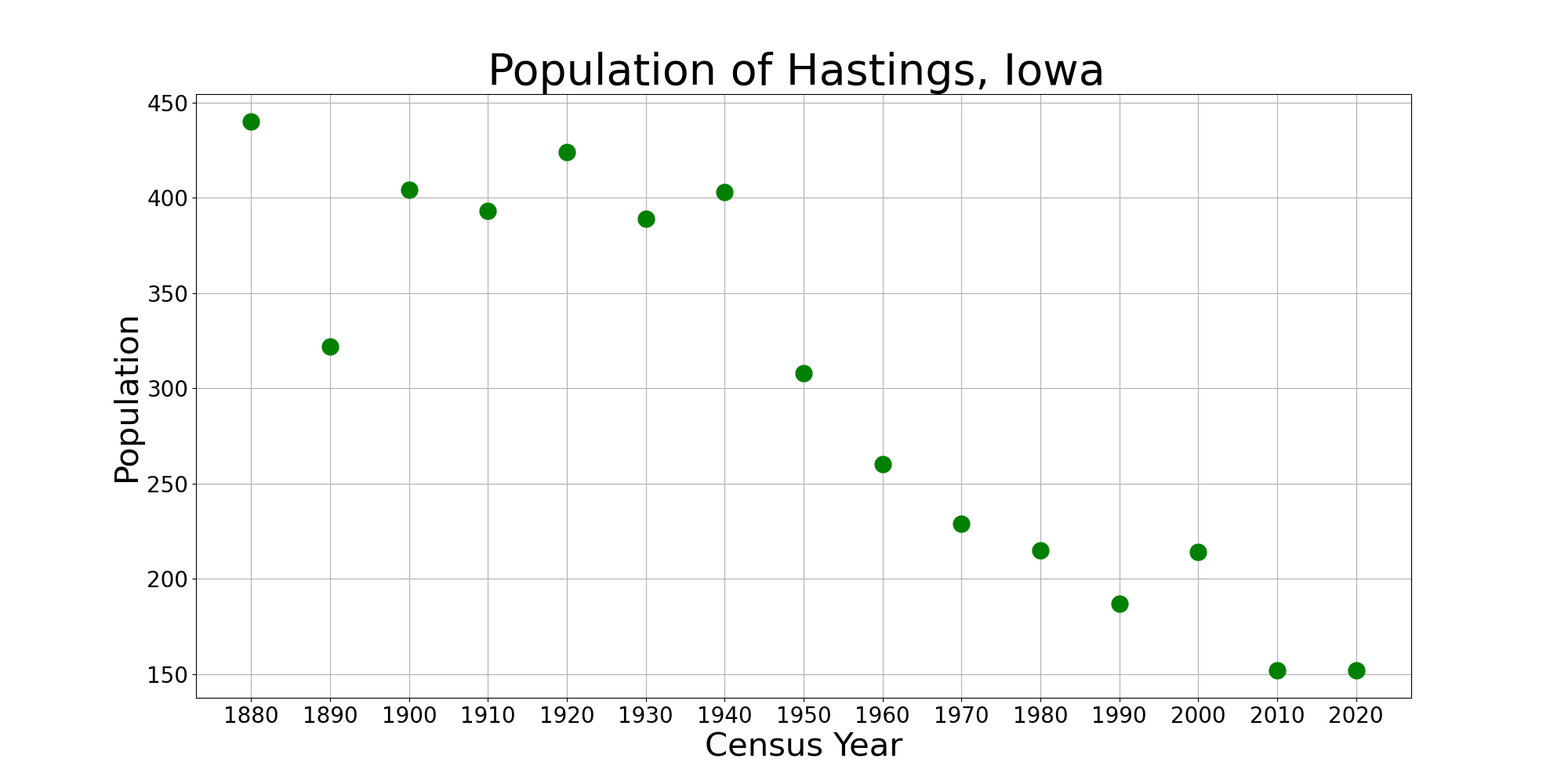
The population of Hastings, Iowa from US census data

=== 2020 census ===
As of the census of 2020, there were 152 people, 73 households, and 47 families residing in the city. The population density was 370.6 inhabitants per square mile (143.1/km^{2}). There were 80 housing units at an average density of 195.1 per square mile (75.3/km^{2}). The racial makeup of the city was 96.7% White, 0.0% Black or African American, 0.0% Native American, 0.0% Asian, 0.0% Pacific Islander, 0.0% from other races and 3.3% from two or more races. Hispanic or Latino persons of any race comprised 0.0% of the population.

Of the 73 households, 41.1% of which had children under the age of 18 living with them, 43.8% were married couples living together, 6.8% were cohabitating couples, 21.9% had a female householder with no spouse or partner present and 27.4% had a male householder with no spouse or partner present. 35.6% of all households were non-families. 30.1% of all households were made up of individuals, 11.0% had someone living alone who was 65 years old or older.

The median age in the city was 41.8 years. 28.3% of the residents were under the age of 20; 3.3% were between the ages of 20 and 24; 19.7% were from 25 and 44; 34.9% were from 45 and 64; and 13.8% were 65 years of age or older. The gender makeup of the city was 50.7% male and 49.3% female.

=== 2010 census ===
As of the census of 2010, there were 152 people, 67 households, and 38 families living in the city. The population density was 370.7 inhabitants per square mile (143.1/km^{2}). There were 79 housing units at an average density of 192.7 per square mile (74.4/km^{2}). The racial makeup of the city was 99.3% White and 0.7% from two or more races. Hispanic or Latino of any race were 1.3% of the population.

There were 67 households, of which 25.4% had children under the age of 18 living with them, 41.8% were married couples living together, 7.5% had a female householder with no husband present, 7.5% had a male householder with no wife present, and 43.3% were non-families. 34.3% of all households were made up of individuals, and 15% had someone living alone who was 65 years of age or older. The average household size was 2.27 and the average family size was 2.92.

The median age in the city was 42.5 years. 24.3% of residents were under the age of 18; 3.3% were between the ages of 18 and 24; 24.3% were from 25 to 44; 27.7% were from 45 to 64; and 20.4% were 65 years of age or older. The gender makeup of the city was 53.9% male and 46.1% female.

=== 2000 census ===
As of the census of 2000, there were 214 people, 85 households, and 57 families living in the city. The population density was 527.2 inhabitants per square mile (203.6/km^{2}). There were 91 housing units at an average density of 224.2 per square mile (86.6/km^{2}). The racial makeup of the city was 98.13% White, 1.40% from other races, and 0.47% from two or more races. Hispanic or Latino of any race were 1.87% of the population.

There were 85 households, out of which 29.4% had children under the age of 18 living with them, 55.3% were married couples living together, 9.4% had a female householder with no husband present, and 31.8% were non-families. 24.7% of all households were made up of individuals, and 8.2% had someone living alone who was 65 years of age or older. The average household size was 2.52 and the average family size was 2.93.

In the city, the population was spread out, with 26.6% under the age of 18, 7.0% from 18 to 24, 28.0% from 25 to 44, 26.2% from 45 to 64, and 12.1% who were 65 years of age or older. The median age was 36 years. For every 100 females, there were 96.3 males. For every 100 females age 18 and over, there were 103.9 males.

The median income for a household in the city was $35,625, and the median income for a family was $47,813. Males had a median income of $36,875 versus $23,125 for females. The per capita income for the city was $13,174. About 17.6% of families and 25.8% of the population were below the poverty line, including 37.5% of those under the age of eighteen and 41.2% of those 65 or over.

== Education ==
The community is within the East Mills Community School District. From July 1, 1960, it was in the Nishna Valley Community School District, until July 1, 2011, when it merged to form the East Mills district.
