= Rawles Township, Mills County, Iowa =

Township in Mills County, Iowa, U.S.

Coordinates: 40.9411°N 95.6633°W

Rawles Township is a township in Mills County, Iowa, United States.

== History ==
Early county records are incomplete. Rawles Township was organized in the early 1850s.
