= Plattville Township, Mills County, Iowa =

Township in Mills County, Iowa, U.S.

Coordinates: 41.0397°N 95.8325°W

Plattville Township is a township in Mills County, Iowa, United States.

== History ==
Early county records are incomplete. Plattville Township was organized in the early 1850s.
