= Mills County, Iowa =

County in Iowa, United States

- County
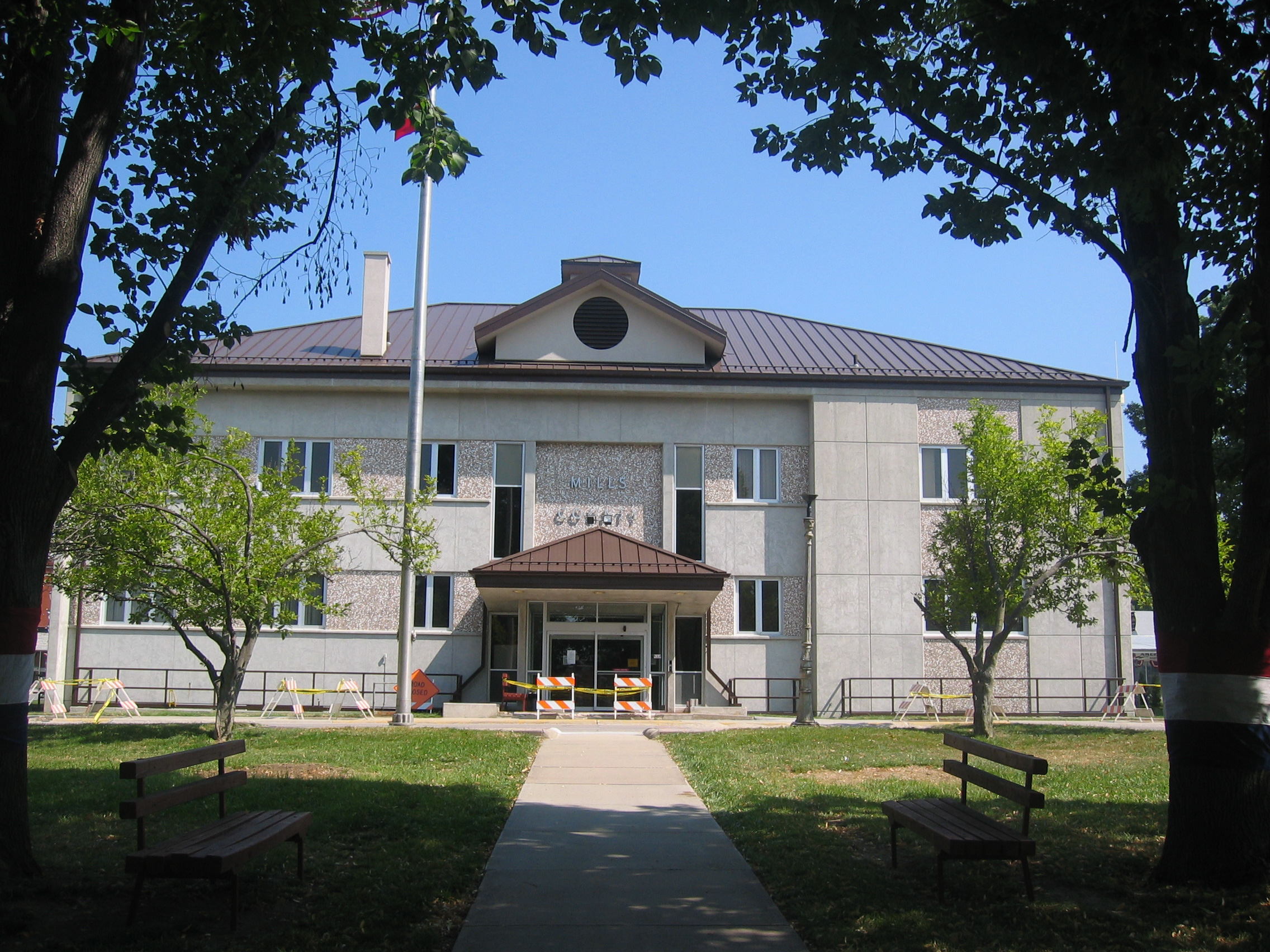
- The Mills County Courthouse in Glenwood

- Location within the U.S. state of Iowa
- Coordinates: 41°01′59″N 95°37′08″W
- Country: United States
- State: Iowa
- Founded: 1851
- Seat: Glenwood
- Largest city: Glenwood

Area
  - Total: 441 sq mi (1,140 km^{2})
  - Land: 437 sq mi (1,130 km^{2})
  - Water: 3.2 sq mi (8.3 km^{2}) 0.7%

Population (2020)
  - Total: 14,484
  - Estimate (2025): 14,793 ▲
  - Density: 33.1/sq mi (12.8/km^{2})
- Time zone: UTC−6 (Central)
  - Summer (DST): UTC−5 (CDT)
- Congressional district: 4th
- Website: www.millscountyiowa.gov
- Iowa county number 65

Mills County is a county located in the U.S. state of Iowa. As of the 2020 census, the population was 14,484. The county seat is Glenwood. The county was formed in 1851 and named for Major Frederick Mills of Burlington, Iowa, who was killed at the Battle of Churubusco during the Mexican–American War.

Mills County is included in the Omaha–Council Bluffs metropolitan area.

== History ==
The future county's first permanent settlement was Rushville, founded in 1846 by persecuted members of the Church of Jesus Christ of Latter-day Saints as they were being driven out of Nauvoo, Illinois. This is not to be confused with the state's present-day Rushville in Jasper County. A nearby settlement, also founded by the Mormon settlers, was called Coonsville after Dr. Liberius Coons, one of the first arrivals. That settlement continued after the Mormons moved on; its name was changed to Glenwood in 1853.

In Glenwood, the first courthouse was a small frame building which served until 1857. It was replaced by a two-story building, which was enlarged in the 1900s and received a clock tower in 1910. In 1959 this building was replaced with the present building, dedicated on August 29, 1959.

== Geography ==
According to the U.S. Census Bureau, the county has a total area of 441 square miles (1,140 km^{2}), of which 437 square miles (1,130 km^{2}) is land and 3.2 square miles (8.3 km^{2}) (0.7%) is water.

=== Major highways ===
- Interstate 29
- U.S. Highway 34
- U.S. Highway 59
- U.S. Highway 275

=== Adjacent counties ===
- Pottawattamie County, Iowa(north)
- Montgomery County, Iowa (east)
- Fremont County, Iowa (south)
- Cass County, Nebraska (southwest)
- Sarpy County, Nebraska (west)

== Demographics ==
Historical population
Census	Pop.	Note	%±
1860	4,481		—
1870	8,718		94.6%
1880	14,137		62.2%
1890	14,548		2.9%
1900	16,764		15.2%
1910	15,811		−5.7%
1920	15,422		−2.5%
1930	15,866		2.9%
1940	15,064		−5.1%
1950	14,064		−6.6%
1960	13,050		−7.2%
1970	11,832		−9.3%
1980	13,406		13.3%
1990	13,202		−1.5%
2000	14,547		10.2%
2010	15,059		3.5%
2020	14,484		−3.8%
2025 (est.)	14,793	▲	2.1%
U.S. Decennial Census; 1790–1960 1900–1990; 1990–2000 2010–2020

=== 2020 census ===
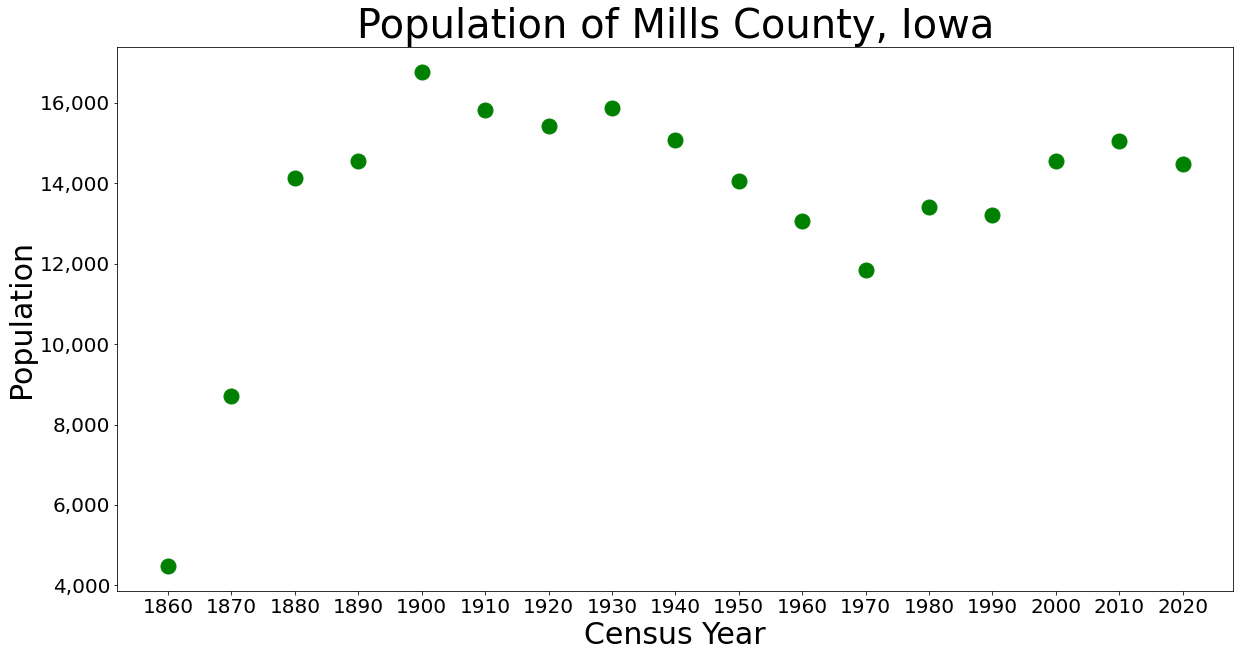
Population of Mills County from the U.S. census data

As of the 2020 census, the county had a population of 14,484 and a population density of 32.9/sq mi (12.7/km^{2}).

The median age was 43.1 years. 24.6% of residents were under the age of 18 and 19.2% of residents were 65 years of age or older. For every 100 females there were 99.6 males, and for every 100 females age 18 and over there were 97.8 males age 18 and over.

According to the 2020 Decennial Census Redistricting Data, 95.16% of the population reported being of one race while 5.63% reported being some other race or more than one race. Of the single-race responses, 90.05% were non-Hispanic White, 0.53% were Black or African American, 0.21% were Native American, 0.33% were Asian, and 0.07% were Native Hawaiian or Pacific Islander. Including multiple-race and other-race residents, the total composition was 93.2% White, 0.5% Black or African American, 0.2% American Indian and Alaska Native, 0.3% Asian, 0.1% Native Hawaiian and Pacific Islander, 0.8% from some other race, and 4.8% from two or more races; Hispanic or Latino residents of any race comprised 3.2% of the population.

34.6% of residents lived in urban areas, while 65.4% lived in rural areas.

There were 5,512 households in the county, of which 32.1% had children under the age of 18 living in them. Of all households, 58.3% were married-couple households, 15.3% were households with a male householder and no spouse or partner present, and 20.7% were households with a female householder and no spouse or partner present. About 23.4% of all households were made up of individuals and 11.5% had someone living alone who was 65 years of age or older. Of the county's 6,110 housing units, 5,512 were occupied (9.8% vacant). Among occupied housing units, 80.6% were owner-occupied and 19.4% were renter-occupied. The homeowner vacancy rate was 1.7% and the rental vacancy rate was 8.6%.

=== 2010 census ===
As of the 2010 census recorded a population of 15,059 in the county, with a population density of 34.5/sq mi (13.3/km^{2}). There were 6,109 housing units, of which 5,605 were occupied.

=== 2000 census ===
As of the 2000 census, there were 14,547 people, 5,324 households, and 3,939 families residing in the county. The population density was 33 people per square mile (13 people/km^{2}). There were 5,671 housing units at an average density of 13 units per square mile (5.0 units/km^{2}). The racial makeup of the county was 97.97% White, 0.28% Black or African American, 0.27% Native American, 0.29% Asian, 0.01% Pacific Islander, 0.36% from other races, and 0.82% from two or more races. 1.23% of the population were Hispanic or Latino of any race.

There were 5,324 households, out of which 34.80% had children under the age of 18 living with them, 61.70% were married couples living together, 8.90% had a female householder with no husband present, and 26.00% were non-families. 22.30% of all households were made up of individuals, and 10.10% had someone living alone who was 65 years of age or older. The average household size was 2.60 and the average family size was 3.04.

In the county, the population was spread out, with 26.80% under the age of 18, 7.00% from 18 to 24, 28.10% from 25 to 44, 25.50% from 45 to 64, and 12.60% who were 65 years of age or older. The median age was 38 years. For every 100 females there were 100.60 males. For every 100 females age 18 and over, there were 96.70 males.

The median income for a household in the county was $42,428, and the median income for a family was $49,592. Males had a median income of $31,721 versus $24,938 for females. The per capita income for the county was $18,736. About 5.80% of families and 8.30% of the population were below the poverty line, including 10.30% of those under age 18 and 7.60% of those age 65 or over.

== Communities ==
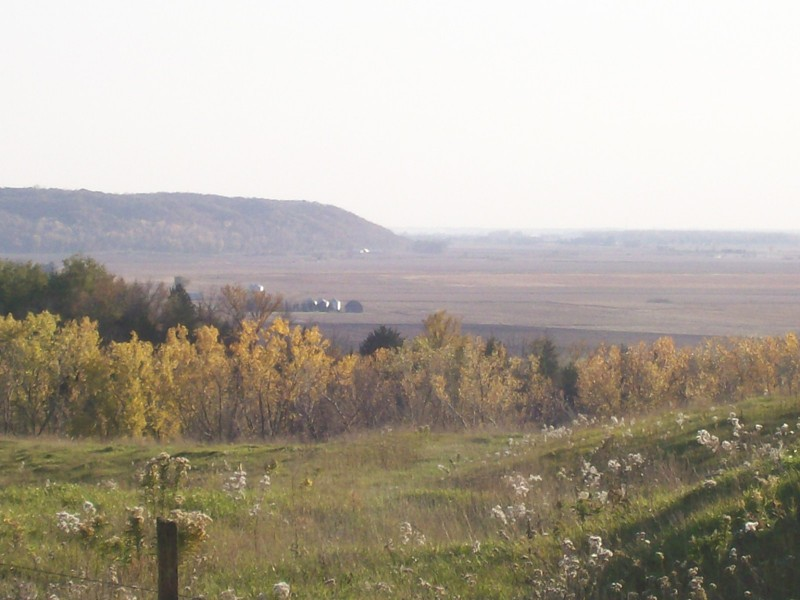
The Loess Hills and Missouri River Valley south of Glenwood

=== Cities ===
- Council Bluffs (mostly in Pottawattamie County)
- Emerson
- Glenwood
- Hastings
- Henderson
- Malvern
- Pacific Junction
- Silver City
- Tabor (partial)

=== Unincorporated communities ===
- Balfour
- Rushville
- Strahan

=== Census-designated place ===
- Mineola

=== Townships ===
- Anderson
- Center
- Deer Creek
- Glenwood
- Indian Creek
- Ingraham
- Lyons
- Oak
- Plattville
- Rawles
- St. Marys
- Silver Creek
- White Cloud

=== Population ranking ===
The population ranking of the following table is based on the 2020 census of Mills County.

† county seat

Rank	City/town/etc.	Municipal type	Population (2020 Census)
1	† Glenwood	City	5,073
2	Malvern	City	1,046
3	Emerson	City	403
4	Silver City	City	245
5	Mineola	CDP	154
6	Hastings	City	152
7	Henderson	City	144
8	Pacific Junction	City	96
9	Tabor (mostly in Fremont County)	City	86 (1,014 total)

== Law enforcement ==
The first Mills County Sheriff was W.W. Noyes who was appointed by the Iowa General Assembly on August 1, 1851. He was succeeded by James Hardy who served as the first elected sheriff of the county and assumed the office on August 31, 1851.

The current sheriff of Mills County is interim sheriff Joshua England. He and his 11 full-time deputies patrol approximately 447 square miles in the county. The Mills County Sheriff's Office provides police services under contract for all of the towns and cities and Mills County except for the City of Glenwood which has its own police department.

== Politics ==
Mills County is one of the most consistently Republican counties in Iowa. It has backed the Republican in all but five elections in its history, its inaugural election in 1852 prior to the founding of the Republican Party, in 1912 when former Republican turned Progressive Theodore Roosevelt caused a split in the vote, allowing Democrat Woodrow Wilson to take the county with a sub-40% plurality, in the two landslide victories for Franklin D. Roosevelt in 1932 and 1936, and for Lyndon B. Johnson in his 1964 landslide, who even then barely took Mills County by only 39 votes and less than 1%.

United States presidential election results for Mills County, Iowa
Year	Republican		Democratic		Third party(ies)	
Year	No.	%	No.	%	No.	%
1896	2,153	51.93%	1,958	47.23%	35	0.84%
1900	2,212	55.00%	1,733	43.09%	77	1.91%
1904	2,252	61.06%	1,274	34.54%	162	4.39%
1908	1,959	55.01%	1,522	42.74%	80	2.25%
1912	850	25.41%	1,312	39.22%	1,183	35.37%
1916	1,707	50.58%	1,600	47.41%	68	2.01%
1920	3,683	69.00%	1,592	29.82%	63	1.18%
1924	3,348	57.38%	1,750	29.99%	737	12.63%
1928	3,429	60.86%	2,179	38.68%	26	0.46%
1932	2,420	38.07%	3,861	60.75%	75	1.18%
1936	3,424	48.40%	3,610	51.02%	41	0.58%
1940	3,873	57.39%	2,862	42.41%	14	0.21%
1944	3,288	60.65%	2,106	38.85%	27	0.50%
1948	2,921	57.20%	2,155	42.20%	31	0.61%
1952	4,028	69.04%	1,792	30.72%	14	0.24%
1956	3,539	64.89%	1,897	34.78%	18	0.33%
1960	3,436	65.37%	1,820	34.63%	0	0.00%
1964	2,424	49.58%	2,463	50.38%	2	0.04%
1968	2,916	62.41%	1,216	26.03%	540	11.56%
1972	3,531	74.94%	1,060	22.50%	121	2.57%
1976	2,722	57.79%	1,908	40.51%	80	1.70%
1980	3,581	69.09%	1,244	24.00%	358	6.91%
1984	3,994	72.80%	1,434	26.14%	58	1.06%
1988	3,212	59.82%	2,092	38.96%	65	1.21%
1992	2,699	43.77%	1,798	29.16%	1,669	27.07%
1996	2,958	51.25%	2,068	35.83%	746	12.92%
2000	3,684	62.28%	2,039	34.47%	192	3.25%
2004	4,556	65.65%	2,308	33.26%	76	1.10%
2008	4,183	57.44%	2,976	40.86%	124	1.70%
2012	4,216	58.46%	2,848	39.49%	148	2.05%
2016	5,067	65.82%	2,090	27.15%	541	7.03%
2020	5,585	67.55%	2,508	30.33%	175	2.12%
2024	5,671	68.71%	2,456	29.76%	126	1.53%

== Local government ==
=== Board of supervisors ===
The board of supervisors is elected according to Plan One of the 1984 Code of Iowa, Chapter 331.208. It is composed of three members elected at large. Vacancies in the board of supervisors are filled by appointment made by the county auditor, county recorder, and the clerk of district court.

== See also ==
- National Register of Historic Places listings in Mills County, Iowa
