= Glenwood, Iowa =

- City
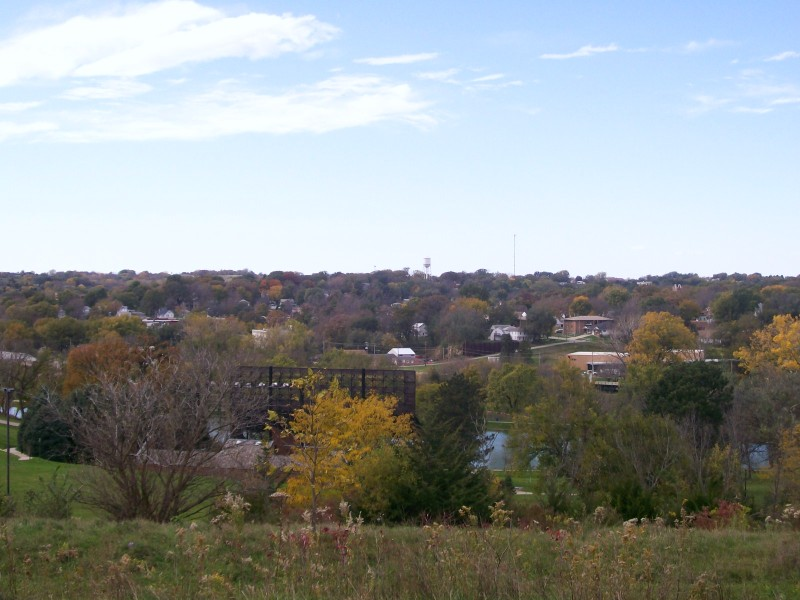
- Looking west at Glenwood from Old Slaughterhouse Hill at the Glenwood Lake Park in 2007

- Location of Glenwood in Mills County and Iowa
- Coordinates: 41°02′45″N 95°44′50″W
- Country: United States
- State: Iowa
- County: Mills

Area
  - Total: 2.93 sq mi (7.60 km^{2})
  - Land: 2.92 sq mi (7.57 km^{2})
  - Water: 0.012 sq mi (0.03 km^{2})
- Elevation: 988 ft (301 m)

Population (2020)
  - Total: 5,073
  - Estimate (2025): 5,389
  - Density: 1,735.7/sq mi (670.15/km^{2})
- Time zone: UTC-6 (Central (CST))
  - Summer (DST): UTC-5 (CDT)
- ZIP code: 51534
- Area code: 712
- FIPS code: 19-31350
- GNIS feature ID: 2394916
- Website: cityofglenwoodia.gov

Glenwood is the largest city in and the county seat of Mills County, Iowa, United States. The population was 5,073 in the 2020 census, a decline from 5,358 in 2000. The city was originally founded by Mormons, before they left for Utah. After the Second World War, Glenwood became a center for meatpacking, particularly kosher meatpacking. Glenwood was impacted by significant flooding in 2019.

== History ==
Located in a hollow of the Loess Hills on the east side of the Missouri River, Glenwood was established by Mormons in 1848 as Coonsville. It prospered during the California Gold Rush largely due to the grain mill on Keg Creek. Coonsville was the scene of anti-Mormon mob violence. It became the county seat of Mills County in 1851. In 1852, after most Mormons left for Utah, it was renamed Glenwood after a Presbyterian minister, Glenn Wood.

The community supported the creation of Nebraska Territory in 1854. Two Glenwood attorneys were elected to the Nebraska territorial legislature, and they were run out of town for accepting shares in Scriptown. At the end of the Civil War, an Iowa Veteran's Orphans Home was founded here. The evangelist (and professional baseball athlete) Billy Sunday lived at the orphanage as a child.

The Burlington and Missouri River Railroad was completed through Glenwood in 1869. During the late 19th century, the community was widely known as Iowa's center of fruit production, particularly of apples, and it hosted an annual Apple Carnival. Early industries included an iron foundry, an expansive marble and stone works, the Glenwood Creamery, and a large cannery that covered a city block on the east side of Locust Street. It distributed its products under the brand-name "The Glenwood". Darting & McGavern's "Sanitary" cannery on South Vine and Railroad Avenue canned tomatoes, pumpkin, apples, and beets into the 1920s.

In 1876 the State Veterans' Orphan's Home at Glenwood was adapted for use as the Iowa Asylum for Feeble-Minded Children, the seventh such facility in the country and the first located west of the Mississippi River. The Glenwood facility expanded with increased acceptance of treatment and institutionalization for intellectual disability; it became the Iowa Institution for Feeble-Minded Children. The grounds and Administration Building were largely patterned on the Kirkbride Plan, as state funding permitted. (The Administration Building has since been demolished.)

The institution has long dominated Glenwood both economically and culturally, although the IIFMC was self-sufficient and intentionally isolated the residents from the rest of the town. By 1925, the Glenwood IIFMC was the home of 1,555 inmates classified as idiots, imbeciles, and morons, according to contemporary definitions. The IIFMC became the Glenwood State-Hospital School in 1941. By the early 1950s, the facility covered 1,185 acres (5 km^{2}); it had 310 staff members for the 1,968 patients. Under the influence of eugenics theory, the state had ordered sterilization of those defined as feeble-minded or worse, and experimental treatments such as cold baths and electroshock were used to reduce symptoms of psychosis and depression. The de-institutionalization of Glenwood began in the late 1950s. A November 17, 1957 article in the Des Moines Register revealed that Mayo Buckner had spent 59 years confined to Glenwood, despite an IQ of 120, indicating above-average intelligence. National attention followed for Buckner and the Glenwood State-Hospital School, which were featured in the December 9, 1957 issue of Time and the March 25, 1958 issue of Life Magazine. During the 1970s, the facility completed a transformation from traditional ward buildings into group home-styled cottages. It is now known as the Glenwood Resource Center and provides services and skills training to support people living in communities.

After World War II, the town of Glenwood became a center of meat-packing. During the early 1950s, it had one of America's largest kosher packinghouses, with most of its product shipped to New York and the East Coast. The packinghouse was later modified to process both cattle and pork; it was bought by Swift & Company and then closed in the 1980s. Meatpacking has moved to sites further west, closer to ranching areas.

Trajet, a hot tub manufacturer, now occupies the former slaughterhouse. A large industrial laundry operated for most of the 20th century in the town until it was purchased and closed by Cintas.

Transportation links include the BNSF; U.S. Route 34, and U.S. Route 275 pass through Glenwood, and Interstate 29 is located a few miles west on the floodplain of the Missouri River. Tourist destinations are the Loess Hills and the National Scenic Byway.

In March 2019, Mills County was hit with catastrophic flooding. While Glenwood itself was not directly affected, residents were without clean water for weeks on a boil order. Glenwood officials worked with Mills County to help flood efforts in nearby towns like Pacific Junction, which was nearly completely submerged with hundreds displaced.

== Geography ==
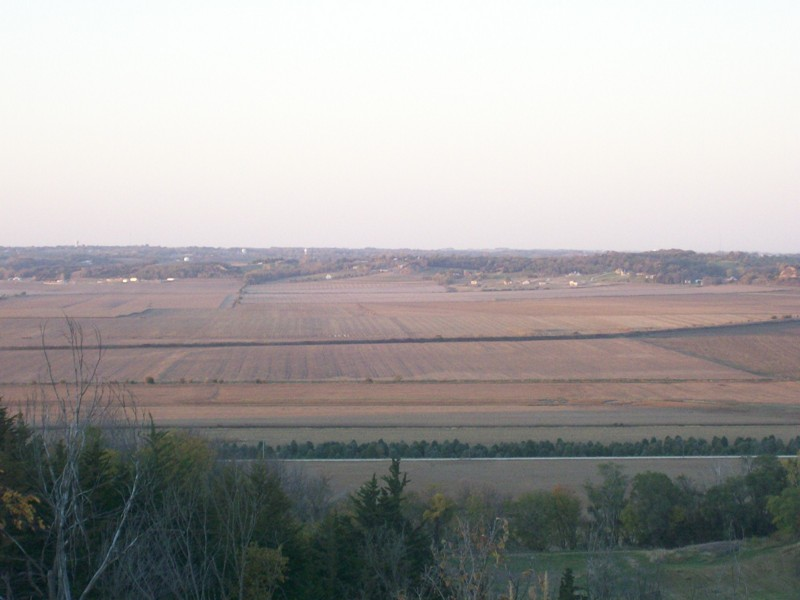
View of Glenwood, Iowa looking north from the Loess Hills.

According to the United States Census Bureau, the city has a total area of 2.96 square miles (7.67 km^{2}), of which 2.95 square miles (7.64 km^{2}) is land and 0.01 square miles (0.03 km^{2}) is water.

== Demographics ==
Historical population
| Census | Pop. | Note | %± |
|---|---|---|---|
| 1860 | 614 | | — |
| 1870 | 1,291 | | 110.3% |
| 1880 | 1,793 | | 38.9% |
| 1890 | 1,890 | | 5.4% |
| 1900 | 3,040 | | 60.8% |
| 1910 | 4,052 | | 33.3% |
| 1920 | 3,862 | | −4.7% |
| 1930 | 4,269 | | 10.5% |
| 1940 | 4,501 | | 5.4% |
| 1950 | 4,664 | | 3.6% |
| 1960 | 4,783 | | 2.6% |
| 1970 | 4,421 | | −7.6% |
| 1980 | 5,280 | | 19.4% |
| 1990 | 4,571 | | −13.4% |
| 2000 | 5,358 | | 17.2% |
| 2010 | 5,269 | | −1.7% |
| 2020 | 5,073 | | −3.7% |
U.S. Decennial Census

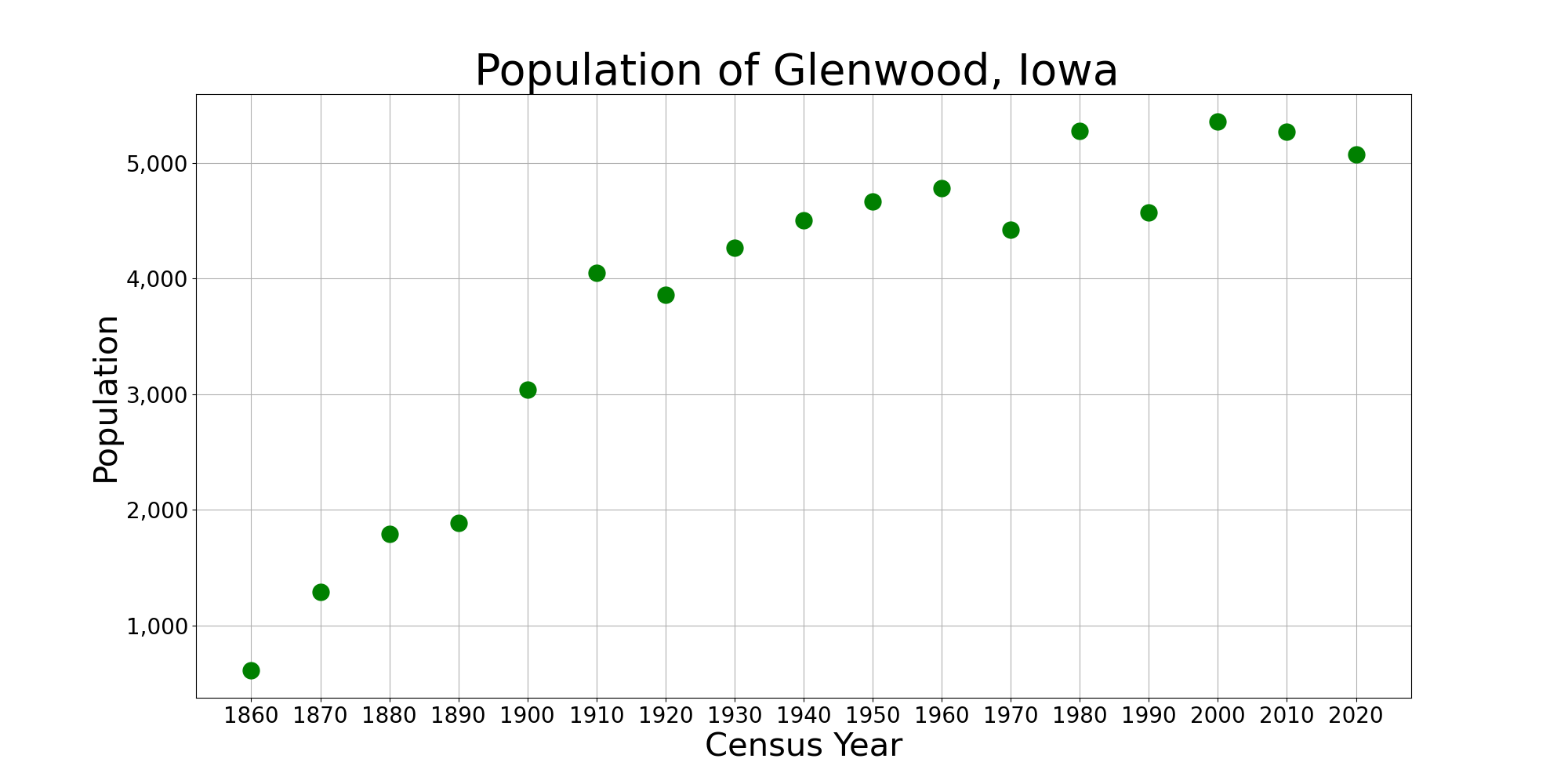
The population of Glenwood, Iowa from US census data

=== 2020 census ===
As of the 2020 census, Glenwood had a population of 5,073, with 1,918 households and 1,220 families residing in the city. The median age was 38.9 years. 25.6% of residents were under the age of 18 and 18.4% of residents were 65 years of age or older. For every 100 females, there were 91.2 males, and for every 100 females age 18 and over there were 87.9 males age 18 and over.

The population density was 1,735.7 inhabitants per square mile (670.1/km^{2}). There were 2,084 housing units at an average density of 713.0 per square mile (275.3/km^{2}). 98.3% of residents lived in urban areas, while 1.7% lived in rural areas.

Of the 1,918 households, 34.0% had children under the age of 18 living in them. Of all households, 45.6% were married-couple households, 6.2% were cohabiting-couple households, 16.9% were households with a male householder and no spouse or partner present, and 31.3% were households with a female householder and no spouse or partner present. About 36.4% were non-family households, 30.5% were made up of individuals, and 14.7% had someone living alone who was 65 years of age or older.

There were 2,084 housing units, of which 8.0% were vacant. The homeowner vacancy rate was 1.8% and the rental vacancy rate was 9.4%.

Racial composition as of the 2020 census
| Race | Number | Percent |
|---|---|---|
| White | 4,712 | 92.9% |
| Black or African American | 28 | 0.6% |
| American Indian and Alaska Native | 11 | 0.2% |
| Asian | 10 | 0.2% |
| Native Hawaiian and Other Pacific Islander | 5 | 0.1% |
| Some other race | 51 | 1.0% |
| Two or more races | 256 | 5.0% |
| Hispanic or Latino (of any race) | 203 | 4.0% |

=== 2010 census ===
At the 2010 census there were 5,269 people in 1,883 households, including 1,243 families, in the city. The population density was 1,786.1 inhabitants per square mile (689.6/km^{2}). There were 2,045 housing units at an average density of 693.2 per square mile (267.6/km^{2}). The racial makup of the city was 96.8% White, 0.6% African American, 0.3% Native American, 0.4% Asian, 0.1% Pacific Islander, 0.7% from other races, and 1.1% from two or more races. Hispanic or Latino of any race were 2.7%.

Of the 1,883 households 35.4% had children under the age of 18 living with them, 48.4% were married couples living together, 12.8% had a female householder with no husband present, 4.8% had a male householder with no wife present, and 34.0% were non-families. 28.7% of households were one person and 11.8% were one person aged 65 or older. The average household size was 2.51 and the average family size was 3.06.

The median age was 38.1 years. 25.8% of residents were under the age of 18; 7.8% were between the ages of 18 and 24; 25.2% were from 25 to 44; 27.6% were from 45 to 64; and 13.7% were 65 or older. The gender makeup of the city was 49.6% male and 50.4% female.

=== 2000 census ===
At the 2000 census there were 5,358 people in 1,863 households, including 1,276 families, in the city. The population density was 2,067.7 inhabitants per square mile (798.3/km^{2}). There were 1,946 housing units at an average density of 751.0 per square mile (290.0/km^{2}). The racial makup of the city was 97.26% White, 0.62% African American, 0.37% Native American, 0.32% Asian, 0.49% from other races, and 0.95% from two or more races. Hispanic or Latino of any race were 1.47%.

Of the 1,863 households 36.1% had children under the age of 18 living with them, 52.5% were married couples living together, 12.9% had a female householder with no husband present, and 31.5% were non-families. 27.5% of households were one person and 12.1% were one person aged 65 or older. The average household size was 2.54 and the average family size was 3.09.

Population spread: 26.3% under the age of 18, 8.8% from 18 to 24, 30.2% from 25 to 44, 21.7% from 45 to 64, and 12.9% 65 or older. The median age was 36 years. For every 100 females, there were 96.3 males. For every 100 females age 18 and over, there were 91.0 males.

The median household income was $39,682 and the median family income was $46,555. Males had a median income of $29,918 versus $24,368 for females. The per capita income for the city was $15,790. About 6.8% of families and 9.5% of the population were below the poverty line, including 10.7% of those under age 18 and 8.4% of those age 65 or over.

== Education ==
Glenwood Community School District is the local school district for the city.

Saint Albert Catholic Schools in Council Bluffs takes students from Glenwood.

== Landmarks and neighborhoods ==
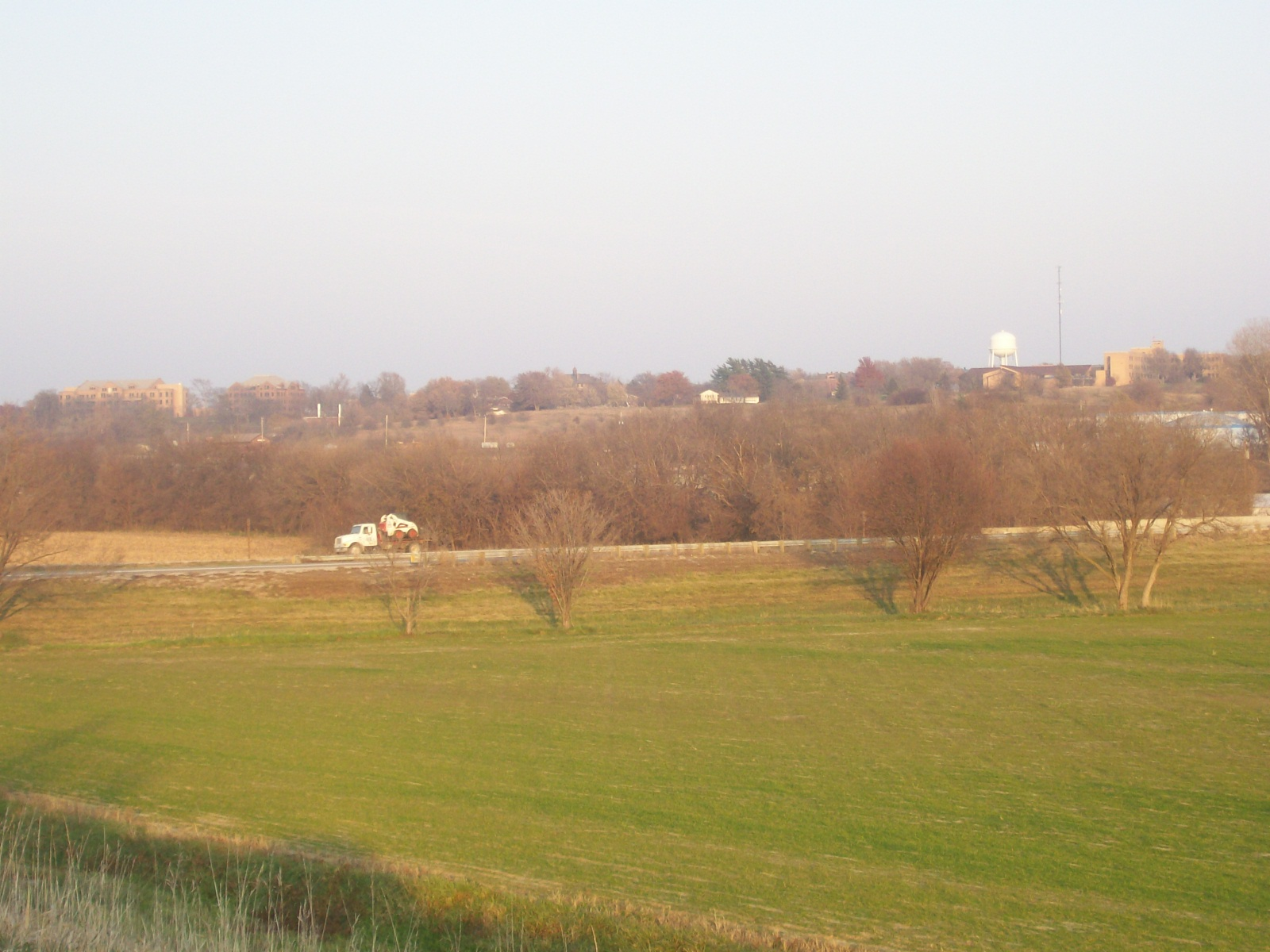
The IIFMC Girls Cottage is at the far left in this view of the campus of the Glenwood Resource Center.

- The IIFMC Girls Cottage at the Glenwood Resource Center was built in 1912. At present it is used for offices by the Glenwood Community School District and remains one of the town's most distinguishing landmarks.
- The Glenwood Earth Lodge and Mills County Natural History Museum.
- The IIFMC Hospital at the Glenwood Resource Center was constructed during the 1890s with conical towers, Romanesque Revival arched balconies, an Italianate cupola, and still-impressive interior spiral staircase. The three-story brick building is used as offices by the Glenwood Resource Center.
- The IIFMC Fire Station at the Glenwood Resource Center was built in 1903 with a Dutch Colonial parapeted roof.
- The VJ Meyer School Building at the Glenwood Resource Center was built in the mid-1950s to improve the level of education available to residents confined to what was then the Glenwood State Hospital-School. The school was named after Dr. VJ Meyer, the Superintendent at Glenwood from 1945 to 1957. The building was dedicated in September 1957 when the gates of the institution were opened to the public for the first time. From 1992 to 2007 this was the location of the Glenwood Middle School.
- The three-story JV Hinchman Building at Sharp and Walnut Streets was completed in 1882 by Hoosier druggist turned financier Joseph Hinchman.
- The 1920 Glenwood State Bank building at 12 North Walnut on the Glenwood Courthouse Square was designed by Danish immigrant architect J. Chris Jensen of Council Bluffs and is notable locally for its Greek Revival marble facade. For many years this was the location of Hamilton's Men's Clothes and is now home to Glenwood Land Surveying Services.
- The First Christian Church at 305 First Street was built in 1867 at a cost of $1,800. It has been a private residence for many years.
- 411 Sharp is a unique two-story Italianate commercial building on the south side of the Glenwood Courthouse Square that was constructed in 1874 with prominent window hoods and is now the location of the Loess Hills Maker Space.

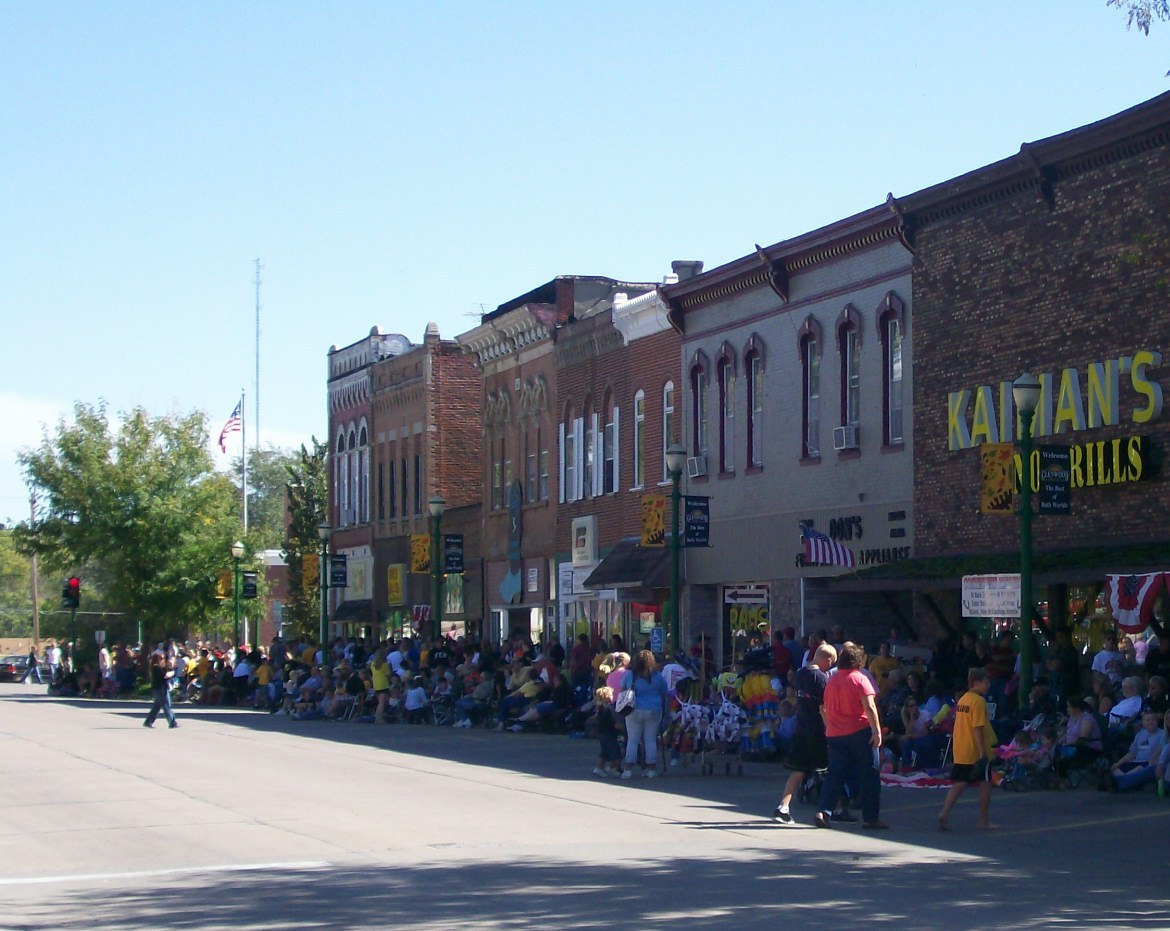
Sharp Street on the Glenwood Courthouse Square during the 2007 Homecoming parade.

- The Hubbell Home at 202 Locust was built in the early 20th century and remains interesting for its Queen Anne style, prominent dormer windows, and adjacent stable long since converted into a garage.
- The Robinson Block at 102 South Walnut on the Glenwood Courthouse Square was constructed during the early 20th century and features a variety of 19th century architectural elements, including a second-story bay window.
- The Buffington Block at 420 1st Street was built on the north side of the Glenwood Courthouse Square during the 1890s with one of the town's most distinguished cornices and seven second-story Italianate arched windows. A Ben Franklin Stores operated here during the latter half of the 20th century.
- The Glenwood Public Library was opened to patrons on February 4, 1907. It was built in part with funds from Andrew Carnegie and is one of 48 public Carnegie library buildings still in use as libraries in Iowa today.
- The Wheeler's Super Service Station at 102 South Vine on the Glenwood Courthouse Square was constructed during the early 1920s to serve traffic along the Bluegrass Highway which became U.S. Route 34. The one-story brick building is unusual locally for its early Moderne architecture.
- The Glenwood Opera House Block at 412-416 First Street was built in 1891 on the Glenwood Courthouse Square with a variety of Richardsonian Romanesque elements. It first began showing motion pictures in 1908, became the Rex Theater by the 1920s, and, after many ownership changes, continues to show movies to the present day although live performances ended in the mid-20th century.
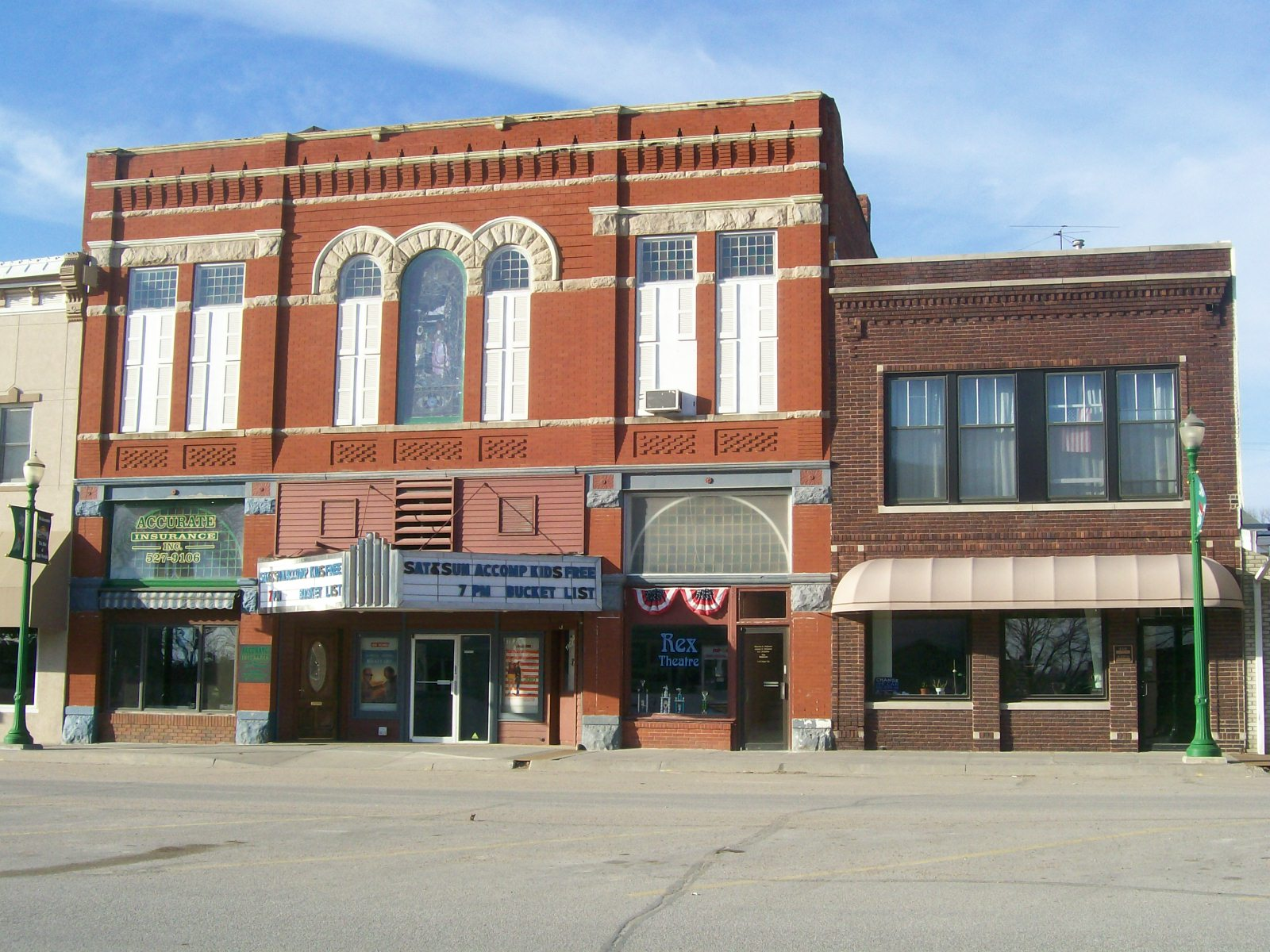
  1891 Glenwood,IA Opera House and Old City Hall
- The Mintle Company Building is a one-story late Moderne structure at 209 Sharp that was built in 1947 along what was then U.S. Route 34. Mintle was a dealer in J.I. Case farm equipment, Pontiac automobiles, and offered a full line of Frigidaire products. The building is now used as the Glenwood Police Department.
- Lilac Terrace were the neighborhoods that developed after the "West Hill" school was completed in 1868. By the early 20th century the area west of Sharp and Hazel Streets was one of the community's more prestigious addresses and still contains some notable architectural styles, including the L.W. Russell home, the H.M. Bogan and James Miller homes, and particularly the Queen Anne style William Lamb mansion on the northwest corner of Hazel and Sharp Streets which has been divided into apartments. Also of interest are the Morris Kaiman home at 102 South Hazel, the Robinson home at 105 North Hazel, and the Addison Meyers home at 404 North Hazel. The Works Progress Administration financed Glenwood High School replaced the West Hill School in 1937, became Glenwood Junior High from 1966 to 1987, and is now part of West Elementary.
- Glenwood Golf Course was opened in 1964 to be the cities first and only golf course. It was designed by Tom Davis. In 1974, ten years after its opening, a man died on the course. He fell into the creek looking for the ball near hole five. It is rumored that he haunts the hole and players are discouraged from looking for balls in the creek.
- Seminary Hill immediately north of the Glenwood Courthouse Square developed after the late 1860s when the private Western Iowa College opened on the city block west of Chestnut between First and Second Streets. This became the Glenwood Methodist Seminary in the 1870s and the location of the East School until the 1970s. The surrounding neighborhood still contains a majority of the town's dominant Protestant churches, including the Glenwood First Congregational Church at 407 Second Street established by abolitionist John Todd in 1857. Nearby are the 1884 Saint John's Episcopal Church at 111 North Vine, the 1911 Glenwood Baptist Church at 212 North Vine, the 1892 Glenwood First Christian at 202 North Vine, the 1905 Grace United Methodist at 112 North Walnut, the 1899 Seventh-day Adventist Church at 205 Third Street, and the 1949 Trinity Lutheran Church of the Lutheran Church–Missouri Synod at 512 Second Street. Also of interest is the Glenwood Public Library at 109 North Vine, a Carnegie library constructed in 1906 and expanded in 1982. The neighborhood formerly had several outstanding architectural examples, including the Dr. Donelan home and the 1870s two-story brick Italianate William Anderson mansion at North Walnut and Second Street that was razed in 2006. Another example of an 1870s brick Italianate residence in the 100 block of North Vine, which is now divided into apartments.
- The Davies Amphitheater located at Glenwood Lake Park is one of the premier outdoor entertainment venues in the Midwest. Constructed in 1980 with funds from the estate of local farmer Charlie Davies, the amphitheater annually hosts a summer concert series.

== Notable people ==
- Hiram Pitt Bennet (1826–1914), Colorado Secretary of State
- Christian Beranek (b. 1974), graphic novelist, actor and producer
- Elmer Burkett (1867–1935), U.S. Senator from Nebraska
- Alice Cooper (1875–1937), sculptor
- Don Hall (b. 1969), filmmaker and 2015 Oscar winner for Disney's Big Hero 6
- Curt Kaufman (b. 1957), pitcher for the California Angels and the New York Yankees
- Billy Sunday (1862–1935), professional baseball player, evangelist
- Otha Wearin (1903–1990), U.S. Representative from Iowa, prolific writer, inducted into National Cowboy Hall of Fame
