= List of United States representatives in the 51st Congress =

This is a complete list of United States representatives during the 51st United States Congress listed by seniority.

As an historical article, the districts and party affiliations listed reflect those during the 51st Congress (March 4, 1889 – March 3, 1891). Seats and party affiliations on similar lists for other congresses will be different for certain members.

Seniority depends on the date on which members were sworn into office. Since many members are sworn in on the same day, subsequent ranking is based on previous congressional service of the individual and then by alphabetical order by the last name of the representative.

Committee chairmanship in the House is often associated with seniority. However, party leadership is typically not associated with seniority.

Note: The "*" indicates that the representative/delegate may have served one or more non-consecutive terms while in the House of Representatives of the United States Congress.

== U.S. House seniority list ==
U.S. House seniority
Rank	Representative	Party	District	Seniority date (Previous service, if any)	No.# of term(s)	Notes
1	William D. Kelley	R	PA-04	March 4, 1861	15th term	Dean of the House; Died on January 9, 1890.
2	Samuel J. Randall	D	PA-03	March 4, 1863	14th term	Dean of the House after Kelley died. Died on April 13, 1890.
3	Richard P. Bland	D	MO-11	March 4, 1873	9th term	Dean of the House after Randall died.
4	James Henderson Blount	D	GA-06	March 4, 1873	9th term	
5	Joseph G. Cannon	R	IL-15	March 4, 1873	9th term	Left the House in 1891.
6	Roger Q. Mills	D	TX-09	March 4, 1873	9th term	
7	Charles O'Neill	R	PA-02	March 4, 1873; Previous service, 1863–1871.	13th term*	
8	David B. Culberson	D	TX-04	March 4, 1875	8th term	
9	William H. Forney	D	AL-07	March 4, 1875	8th term	
10	Thomas J. Henderson	R	IL-07	March 4, 1875	8th term	
11	William McKendree Springer	D	IL-13	March 4, 1875	8th term	
12	Thomas McKee Bayne	R	PA-23	March 4, 1877	7th term	Left the House in 1891.
13	Thomas M. Browne	R	IN-06	March 4, 1877	7th term	Left the House in 1891.
14	John G. Carlisle	D	KY-06	March 4, 1877	7th term	Resigned on May 26, 1890.
15	Robert H. M. Davidson	D	FL-01	March 4, 1877	7th term	Left the House in 1891.
16	Alfred C. Harmer	R	PA-05	March 4, 1877; Previous service, 1871–1875.	9th term*	
17	Hilary A. Herbert	D	AL-02	March 4, 1877	7th term	
18	John H. Ketcham	R	NY-16	March 4, 1877; Previous service, 1865–1873.	11th term*	
19	Thomas Brackett Reed	R	ME-01	March 4, 1877	7th term	Speaker of the House
20	Thomas Ryan	R	KS-04	March 4, 1877	7th term	Resigned on April 4, 1889.
21	Richard W. Townshend	D	IL-19	March 4, 1877	7th term	Died on March 9, 1889.
22	John Alexander Anderson	R	KS-05	March 4, 1879	6th term	Left the House in 1891.
23	Henry H. Bingham	R	PA-01	March 4, 1879	6th term	
24	William H. Hatch	D	MO-01	March 4, 1879	6th term	
25	Leonidas C. Houk	R	TN-02	March 4, 1879	6th term	
26	Benton McMillin	D	TN-04	March 4, 1879	6th term	
27	Ezra B. Taylor	R	OH-19	December 13, 1880	6th term	
28	Newton C. Blanchard	D	LA-04	March 4, 1881	5th term	
29	Judson C. Clements	D	GA-07	March 4, 1881	5th term	Left the House in 1891.
30	William S. Holman	D	IN-04	March 4, 1881; Previous service, 1859–1865 and 1867–1877.	13th term**	
31	William C. Oates	D	AL-03	March 4, 1881	5th term	
32	Lewis E. Payson	R	IL-09	March 4, 1881	5th term	Left the House in 1891.
33	Henry G. Turner	D	GA-02	March 4, 1881	5th term	
34	George D. Wise	D	VA-03	March 4, 1881	5th term	Resigned on April 10, 1890.
35	Nelson Dingley Jr.	R	ME-02	September 12, 1881	5th term	
36	Henry J. Spooner	R	RI-01	December 5, 1881	5th term	Left the House in 1891.
37	Robert R. Hitt	R	IL-06	December 4, 1882	5th term	
38	George E. Adams	R	IL-04	March 4, 1883	4th term	Left the House in 1891.
39	Louis E. Atkinson	R	PA-18	March 4, 1883	4th term	
40	Charles A. Boutelle	R	ME-04	March 4, 1883	4th term	
41	Clifton R. Breckinridge	D	AR-02	March 4, 1883	4th term	Unseated on September 5, 1890. Returned to Congress on November 4, 1890.
42	Allen D. Candler	D	GA-09	March 4, 1883	4th term	Left the House in 1891.
43	Felix Campbell	D	NY-02	March 4, 1883	4th term	Left the House in 1891.
44	Charles Frederick Crisp	D	GA-03	March 4, 1883	4th term	
45	Byron M. Cutcheon	R	MI-09	March 4, 1883	4th term	Left the House in 1891.
46	George W. Dargan	D	SC-06	March 4, 1883	4th term	Left the House in 1891.
47	Samuel Dibble	D	SC-01	March 4, 1883; Previous service, 1881–1882.	5th term*	Left the House in 1891.
48	Alexander Monroe Dockery	D	MO-03	March 4, 1883	4th term	
49	John J. Hemphill	D	SC-05	March 4, 1883	4th term	
50	David B. Henderson	R	IA-03	March 4, 1883	4th term	
51	James Laird	R	NE-02	March 4, 1883	4th term	Died on August 17, 1889.
52	S. W. T. Lanham	D	TX-11	March 4, 1883	4th term	
53	William McAdoo	D	NJ-07	March 4, 1883	4th term	Left the House in 1891.
54	Louis E. McComas	R	MD-06	March 4, 1883	4th term	Left the House in 1891.
55	Seth L. Milliken	R	ME-03	March 4, 1883	4th term	
56	Edmund Needham Morrill	R	KS-01	March 4, 1883	4th term	Left the House in 1891.
57	Samuel W. Peel	D	AR-05	March 4, 1883	4th term	
58	Samuel R. Peters	R	KS-07	March 4, 1883	4th term	Left the House in 1891.
59	Bishop W. Perkins	R	KS-03	March 4, 1883	4th term	Left the House in 1891.
60	John H. Rogers	D	AR-04	March 4, 1883	4th term	Left the House in 1891.
61	Jonathan H. Rowell	R	IL-14	March 4, 1883	4th term	Left the House in 1891.
62	George E. Seney	D	OH-05	March 4, 1883	4th term	Left the House in 1891.
63	Charles Stewart	D	TX-01	March 4, 1883	4th term	
64	John Wolcott Stewart	R	VT-01	March 4, 1883	4th term	Left the House in 1891.
65	Isaac S. Struble	R	IA-11	March 4, 1883	4th term	Left the House in 1891.
66	George D. Tillman	D	SC-02	March 4, 1883; Previous service, 1879–1882.	6th term*	
67	William Lyne Wilson	D	WV-02	March 4, 1883	4th term	
68	Francis W. Rockwell	R	MA-12	January 17, 1884	4th term	Left the House in 1891.
69	Edward H. Funston	R	KS-02	March 21, 1884	4th term	
70	Charles Triplett O'Ferrall	D	VA-07	May 5, 1884	4th term	
71	John Mills Allen	D	MS-01	March 4, 1885	3rd term	
72	Charles S. Baker	R	NY-30	March 4, 1885	3rd term	Left the House in 1891.
73	George Thomas Barnes	D	GA-10	March 4, 1885	3rd term	Left the House in 1891.
74	William Campbell Preston Breckinridge	D	KY-07	March 4, 1885	3rd term	
75	James Buchanan	R	NJ-02	March 4, 1885	3rd term	
76	Julius C. Burrows	R	MI-04	March 4, 1885; Previous service, 1873–1875 and 1879–1883.	6th term**	
77	Benjamin Butterworth	R	OH-01	March 4, 1885; Previous service, 1879–1883.	5th term*	Left the House in 1891.
78	William D. Bynum	D	IN-07	March 4, 1885	3rd term	
79	Lucien B. Caswell	R	WI-01	March 4, 1885; Previous service, 1875–1883.	7th term*	Left the House in 1891.
80	Thomas C. Catchings	D	MS-03	March 4, 1885	3rd term	
81	Barnes Compton	D	MD-05	March 4, 1885	3rd term	Resigned on March 20, 1890.
82	Edwin H. Conger	R	IA-07	March 4, 1885	3rd term	Resigned on October 3, 1890.
83	William C. Cooper	R	OH-09	March 4, 1885	3rd term	Left the House in 1891.
84	William H. H. Cowles	D	NC-08	March 4, 1885	3rd term	
85	William H. Crain	D	TX-07	March 4, 1885	3rd term	
86	George Washington Emery Dorsey	R	NE-03	March 4, 1885	3rd term	Left the House in 1891.
87	John M. Farquhar	R	NY-32	March 4, 1885	3rd term	Left the House in 1891.
88	Edward J. Gay	D	LA-03	March 4, 1885	3rd term	Died on May 30, 1889.
89	Charles Hopper Gibson	D	MD-01	March 4, 1885	3rd term	Left the House in 1891.
90	William W. Grout	R	VT-02	March 4, 1885; Previous service, 1881–1883.	4th term*	
91	Charles H. Grosvenor	R	OH-15	March 4, 1885	3rd term	Left the House in 1891.
92	John T. Heard	D	MO-06	March 4, 1885	3rd term	
93	John S. Henderson	D	NC-07	March 4, 1885	3rd term	
94	Binger Hermann	R	OR	March 4, 1885	3rd term	
95	Robert M. La Follette Sr.	R	WI-03	March 4, 1885	3rd term	Left the House in 1891.
96	Frank Lawler	D	IL-02	March 4, 1885	3rd term	Left the House in 1891.
97	Herman Lehlbach	R	NJ-06	March 4, 1885	3rd term	Left the House in 1891.
98	James B. McCreary	D	KY-08	March 4, 1885	3rd term	
99	Joseph McKenna	R	CA-03	March 4, 1885	3rd term	
100	William McKinley	R	OH-18	March 4, 1885; Previous service, 1877–1884.	7th term*	Left the House in 1891.
101	James B. Morgan	D	MS-02	March 4, 1885	3rd term	Left the House in 1891.
102	William W. Morrow	R	CA-04	March 4, 1885	3rd term	Left the House in 1891.
103	James O'Donnell	R	MI-03	March 4, 1885	3rd term	
104	Edwin Sylvanus Osborne	R	PA-12	March 4, 1885	3rd term	Left the House in 1891.
105	Joseph H. Outhwaite	D	OH-13	March 4, 1885	3rd term	
106	William D. Owen	R	IN-10	March 4, 1885	3rd term	Left the House in 1891.
107	William H. Perry	D	SC-04	March 4, 1885	3rd term	Left the House in 1891.
108	James D. Richardson	D	TN-05	March 4, 1885	3rd term	
109	John G. Sawyer	R	NY-31	March 4, 1885	3rd term	Left the House in 1891.
110	Joseph D. Sayers	D	TX-10	March 4, 1885	3rd term	
111	William G. Stahlnecker	D	NY-14	March 4, 1885	3rd term	
112	William J. Stone	D	MO-12	March 4, 1885	3rd term	Left the House in 1891.
113	William Johnson Stone	D	KY-01	March 4, 1885	3rd term	
114	Ormsby B. Thomas	R	WI-07	March 4, 1885	3rd term	Left the House in 1891.
115	Albert C. Thompson	R	OH-11	March 4, 1885	3rd term	Left the House in 1891.
116	William H. Wade	R	MO-13	March 4, 1885	3rd term	Left the House in 1891.
117	Joseph Wheeler	D	AL-08	March 4, 1885; Previous service, 1881–1882 and 1883.	5th term**	
118	Albert J. Hopkins	R	IL-05	December 7, 1885	3rd term	
119	Thomas Chipman McRae	D	AR-03	December 7, 1885	3rd term	
120	Samuel S. Cox	D	NY-09	November 2, 1886; Previous service, 1857–1865, 1869–1873 and 1873–1885.	16th term***	Died on September 10, 1889.
121	Harry Welles Rusk	D	MD-03	November 2, 1886	3rd term	
122	Joseph Abbott	D	TX-06	March 4, 1887	2nd term	
123	Edward P. Allen	R	MI-02	March 4, 1887	2nd term	Left the House in 1891.
124	Chapman L. Anderson	D	MS-05	March 4, 1887	2nd term	Left the House in 1891.
125	Warren O. Arnold	R	RI-02	March 4, 1887	2nd term	Left the House in 1891.
126	John H. Bankhead	D	AL-06	March 4, 1887	2nd term	
127	Marion Biggs	D	CA-02	March 4, 1887	2nd term	Left the House in 1891.
128	Melvin M. Boothman	R	OH-06	March 4, 1887	2nd term	Left the House in 1891.
129	George E. Bowden	R	VA-02	March 4, 1887	2nd term	Left the House in 1891.
130	Mark S. Brewer	R	MI-06	March 4, 1887; Previous service, 1877–1881.	4th term*	Left the House in 1891.
131	John M. Brower	R	NC-05	March 4, 1887	2nd term	Left the House in 1891.
132	Thomas H. B. Browne	R	VA-01	March 4, 1887	2nd term	Left the House in 1891.
133	Charles R. Buckalew	D	PA-17	March 4, 1887	2nd term	Left the House in 1891.
134	Henry Hull Carlton	D	GA-08	March 4, 1887	2nd term	Left the House in 1891.
135	Asher G. Caruth	D	KY-05	March 4, 1887	2nd term	
136	Joseph B. Cheadle	R	IN-09	March 4, 1887	2nd term	Left the House in 1891.
137	John Logan Chipman	D	MI-01	March 4, 1887	2nd term	
138	Charles B. Clark	R	WI-06	March 4, 1887	2nd term	Left the House in 1891.
139	James E. Cobb	D	AL-05	March 4, 1887	2nd term	
140	William Cogswell	R	MA-07	March 4, 1887	2nd term	
141	James S. Cothran	D	SC-03	March 4, 1887	2nd term	Left the House in 1891.
142	John Dalzell	R	PA-22	March 4, 1887	2nd term	
143	Smedley Darlington	R	PA-06	March 4, 1887	2nd term	Left the House in 1891.
144	Milton De Lano	R	NY-26	March 4, 1887	2nd term	Left the House in 1891.
145	William Elliott	D	SC-07	March 4, 1887	2nd term	Resigned on September 23, 1890.
146	Benjamin A. Enloe	D	TN-08	March 4, 1887	2nd term	
147	Hugh F. Finley	R	KY-11	March 4, 1887	2nd term	Left the House in 1891.
148	Ashbel P. Fitch	D	NY-13	March 4, 1887	2nd term	
149	Thomas S. Flood	R	NY-28	March 4, 1887	2nd term	Left the House in 1891.
150	John H. Gear	R	IA-01	March 4, 1887	2nd term	Left the House in 1891.
151	William H. Gest	R	IL-11	March 4, 1887	2nd term	Left the House in 1891.
152	Thomas Wingfield Grimes	D	GA-04	March 4, 1887	2nd term	Left the House in 1891.
153	Silas Hare	D	TX-05	March 4, 1887	2nd term	Left the House in 1891.
154	Nils P. Haugen	R	WI-08	March 4, 1887	2nd term	
155	Walter I. Hayes	D	IA-02	March 4, 1887	2nd term	
156	Charles E. Hooker	D	MS-07	March 4, 1887; Previous service, 1875–1883.	6th term*	
157	Robert P. Kennedy	R	OH-08	March 4, 1887	2nd term	Left the House in 1891.
158	Daniel Kerr	R	IA-05	March 4, 1887	2nd term	Left the House in 1891.
159	Constantine B. Kilgore	D	TX-03	March 4, 1887	2nd term	
160	William G. Laidlaw	R	NY-34	March 4, 1887	2nd term	Left the House in 1891.
161	Edward Lane	D	IL-17	March 4, 1887	2nd term	
162	William Henry Fitzhugh Lee	D	VA-08	March 4, 1887	2nd term	
163	John Lind	R	MN-02	March 4, 1887	2nd term	
164	Henry Cabot Lodge	R	MA-06	March 4, 1887	2nd term	
165	Levi Maish	D	PA-19	March 4, 1887; Previous service, 1875–1879.	4th term*	Left the House in 1891.
166	Charles H. Mansur	D	MO-02	March 4, 1887	2nd term	
167	William E. Mason	R	IL-03	March 4, 1887	2nd term	Left the House in 1891.
168	Charles W. McClammy	D	NC-03	March 4, 1887	2nd term	Left the House in 1891.
169	Henry Clay McCormick	R	PA-16	March 4, 1887	2nd term	Left the House in 1891.
170	John H. Moffitt	R	NY-21	March 4, 1887	2nd term	Left the House in 1891.
171	Alexander B. Montgomery	D	KY-04	March 4, 1887	2nd term	
172	Littleton W. Moore	D	TX-08	March 4, 1887	2nd term	
173	Newton W. Nutting	R	NY-27	March 4, 1887; Previous service, 1883–1885.	3rd term*	Died on October 15, 1889.
174	John H. O'Neall	D	IN-02	March 4, 1887	2nd term	Left the House in 1891.
175	John B. Penington	D	DE	March 4, 1887	2nd term	Left the House in 1891.
176	James Phelan Jr.	D	TN-10	March 4, 1887	2nd term	Died on January 30, 1891.
177	Philip S. Post	R	IL-10	March 4, 1887	2nd term	
178	Jacob J. Pugsley	R	OH-12	March 4, 1887	2nd term	Left the House in 1891.
179	Alfred Rowland	D	NC-06	March 4, 1887	2nd term	Left the House in 1891.
180	Charles Addison Russell	R	CT-03	March 4, 1887	2nd term	
181	Edward Scull	R	PA-20	March 4, 1887	2nd term	
182	James S. Sherman	R	NY-23	March 4, 1887	2nd term	Left the House in 1891.
183	Benjamin F. Shively	D	IN-13	March 4, 1887; Previous service, 1884–1885.	3rd term*	
184	Francis B. Spinola	D	NY-10	March 4, 1887	2nd term	
185	John D. Stewart	D	GA-05	March 4, 1887	2nd term	Left the House in 1891.
186	T. R. Stockdale	D	MS-06	March 4, 1887	2nd term	
187	Joseph D. Taylor	R	OH-17	March 4, 1887; Previous service, 1883–1885.	4th term*	
188	Erastus J. Turner	R	KS-06	March 4, 1887	2nd term	Left the House in 1891.
189	William Vandever	R	CA-06	March 4, 1887; Previous service, 1859–1863.	4th term*	Left the House in 1891.
190	James P. Walker	D	MO-14	March 4, 1887	2nd term	Died on July 19, 1890.
191	Joseph E. Washington	D	TN-06	March 4, 1887	2nd term	
192	Washington C. Whitthorne	D	TN-07	March 4, 1887; Previous service, 1871–1883.	8th term*	Left the House in 1891.
193	Justin Rice Whiting	D	MI-07	March 4, 1887	2nd term	
194	Charles Preston Wickham	R	OH-14	March 4, 1887	2nd term	Left the House in 1891.
195	David Wilber	R	NY-24	March 4, 1887; Previous service, 1873–1875 and 1879–1881.	4th term**	Died on April 1, 1890.
196	Elihu S. Williams	R	OH-03	March 4, 1887	2nd term	Left the House in 1891.
197	Theodore S. Wilkinson	D	LA-01	March 4, 1887	2nd term	Left the House in 1891.
198	Robert Morris Yardley	R	PA-07	March 4, 1887	2nd term	Left the House in 1891.
199	Samuel S. Yoder	D	OH-04	March 4, 1887	2nd term	Left the House in 1891.
200	William Harrison Martin	D	TX-02	November 4, 1887	2nd term	Left the House in 1891.
201	Charles Tracey	D	NY-19	November 8, 1887	2nd term	
202	James J. Belden	R	NY-25	November 8, 1887	2nd term	
203	Samuel Matthews Robertson	D	LA-06	December 5, 1887	2nd term	
204	John D. Alderson	D	WV-03	March 4, 1889	1st term	
205	John F. Andrew	D	MA-03	March 4, 1889	1st term	
206	Nathaniel P. Banks	R	MA-05	March 4, 1889; Previous service, 1853–1857, 1865-1873 and 1875–1879.	10th term***	Left the House in 1891.
207	Horace F. Bartine	R	NV	March 4, 1889	1st term	
208	Charles Barwig	D	WI-02	March 4, 1889	1st term	
209	Charles D. Beckwith	R	NJ-05	March 4, 1889	1st term	Left the House in 1891.
210	Christopher A. Bergen	R	NJ-01	March 4, 1889	1st term	
211	Charles E. Belknap	R	MI-05	March 4, 1889	1st term	Left the House in 1891.
212	Aaron T. Bliss	R	MI-08	March 4, 1889	1st term	Left the House in 1891.
213	Charles J. Boatner	D	LA-05	March 4, 1889	1st term	
214	George H. Brickner	D	WI-05	March 4, 1889	1st term	
215	Elijah V. Brookshire	D	IN-08	March 4, 1889	1st term	
216	Marriott Henry Brosius	R	PA-10	March 4, 1889	1st term	
217	Jason B. Brown	D	IN-03	March 4, 1889	1st term	
218	David B. Brunner	D	PA-09	March 4, 1889	1st term	
219	John A. Buchanan	D	VA-09	March 4, 1889	1st term	
220	Robert Bullock	D	FL-02	March 4, 1889	1st term	
221	Benjamin H. Bunn	D	NC-04	March 4, 1889	1st term	
222	Theodore E. Burton	R	OH-21	March 4, 1889	1st term	Left the House in 1891.
223	John A. Caldwell	R	OH-02	March 4, 1889	1st term	
224	John W. Candler	R	MA-09	March 4, 1889; Previous service, 1881–1883.	2nd term*	Left the House in 1891.
225	William H. Cate	D	AR-01	March 4, 1889	1st term	Resigned on March 5, 1890.
226	Henry P. Cheatham	R	NC-02	March 4, 1889	1st term	
227	John Michael Clancy	D	NY-04	March 4, 1889	1st term	
228	Richard Henry Clarke	D	AL-01	March 4, 1889	1st term	
229	Thomas J. Clunie	D	CA-05	March 4, 1889	1st term	Left the House in 1891.
230	Hamilton D. Coleman	R	LA-02	March 4, 1889	1st term	Left the House in 1891.
231	Solomon Comstock	R	MN-05	March 4, 1889	1st term	Left the House in 1891.
232	William James Connell	R	NE-01	March 4, 1889	1st term	Left the House in 1891.
233	George W. Cooper	D	IN-05	March 4, 1889	1st term	
234	James W. Covert	D	NY-01	March 4, 1889; Previous service, 1877–1881.	3rd term*	
235	Samuel Alfred Craig	R	PA-21	March 4, 1889	1st term	Left the House in 1891.
236	William Constantine Culbertson	R	PA-26	March 4, 1889	1st term	Left the House in 1891.
237	John J. De Haven	R	CA-01	March 4, 1889	1st term	Resigned on October 1, 1890.
238	Jonathan P. Dolliver	R	IA-10	March 4, 1889	1st term	
239	Mark H. Dunnell	R	MN-01	March 4, 1889; Previous service, 1871–1883.	7th term*	Left the House in 1891.
240	Edward J. Dunphy	D	NY-07	March 4, 1889	1st term	
241	Paul C. Edmunds	D	VA-06	March 4, 1889	1st term	
242	William Thomas Ellis	D	KY-02	March 4, 1889	1st term	
243	Henry Clay Evans	R	TN-03	March 4, 1889	1st term	Left the House in 1891.
244	Hamilton G. Ewart	R	NC-09	March 4, 1889	1st term	Left the House in 1891.
245	George W. Fithian	D	IL-16	March 4, 1889	1st term	
246	Frank T. Fitzgerald	D	NY-06	March 4, 1889	1st term	Resigned on November 4, 1889.
247	James Patton Flick	R	IA-08	March 4, 1889	1st term	
248	Roswell P. Flower	D	NY-12	March 4, 1889; Previous service, 1881–1883.	2nd term*	
249	Nathan Frank	R	MO-09	March 4, 1889	1st term	Left the House in 1891.
250	William St. John Forman	D	IL-18	March 4, 1889	1st term	
251	Samuel Fowler	D	NJ-04	March 4, 1889	1st term	
252	Jacob Augustus Geissenhainer	D	NJ-03	March 4, 1889	1st term	
253	Isaac Goodnight	D	KY-03	March 4, 1889	1st term	
254	Frederic T. Greenhalge	R	MA-08	March 4, 1889	1st term	Left the House in 1891.
255	Darwin Hall	R	MN-03	March 4, 1889	1st term	Left the House in 1891.
256	William E. Haynes	D	OH-10	March 4, 1889	1st term	
257	Charles A. Hill	R	IL-08	March 4, 1889	1st term	Left the House in 1891.
258	James M. Jackson	D	WV-04	March 4, 1889	1st term	Resigned on February 3, 1890.
259	James Kerr	D	PA-28	March 4, 1889	1st term	Left the House in 1891.
260	William Medcalf Kinsey	D	MO-10	March 4, 1889	1st term	Left the House in 1891.
261	Charles J. Knapp	R	NY-17	March 4, 1889	1st term	Left the House in 1891.
262	John F. Lacey	R	IA-06	March 4, 1889	1st term	Left the House in 1891.
263	Frederick Lansing	R	NY-22	March 4, 1889	1st term	Left the House in 1891.
264	Posey G. Lester	D	VA-05	March 4, 1889	1st term	
265	Rufus E. Lester	D	GA-01	March 4, 1889	1st term	
266	Clarke Lewis	D	MS-04	March 4, 1889	1st term	
267	Thomas F. Magner	D	NY-05	March 4, 1889	1st term	
268	Augustus N. Martin	D	IN-11	March 4, 1889	1st term	
269	John H. McCarthy	D	NY-08	March 4, 1889	1st term	Resigned on January 14, 1891.
270	Charles A. O. McClellan	D	IN-12	March 4, 1889	1st term	
271	Myron H. McCord	R	WI-09	March 4, 1889	1st term	Left the House in 1891.
272	Frederick Miles	R	CT-04	March 4, 1889; Previous service, 1879–1883.	3rd term*	Left the House in 1891.
273	Orren C. Moore	R	NH-02	March 4, 1889	1st term	Left the House in 1891.
274	Henry Lee Morey	R	OH-07	March 4, 1889; Previous service, 1881–1884.	3rd term*	Left the House in 1891.
275	Elijah A. Morse	R	MA-02	March 4, 1889	1st term	
276	William Mutchler	D	PA-08	March 4, 1889; Previous service, 1875–1877 and 1881–1885.	4th term**	
277	Frederick G. Niedringhaus	R	MO-08	March 4, 1889	1st term	Left the House in 1891.
278	Richard Henry Norton	D	MO-07	March 4, 1889	1st term	
279	Alonzo Nute	R	NH-01	March 4, 1889	1st term	Left the House in 1891.
280	Joseph H. O'Neil	D	MA-04	March 4, 1889	1st term	
281	William F. Parrett	D	IN-01	March 4, 1889	1st term	
282	Thomas H. Paynter	D	KY-09	March 4, 1889	1st term	
283	John O. Pendleton	D	WV-01	March 4, 1889	1st term	Resigned on February 26, 1890.
284	Rice Alexander Pierce	D	TN-09	March 4, 1889; Previous service, 1883–1885.	2nd term*	
285	James W. Owens	D	OH-16	March 4, 1889	1st term	
286	John A. Quackenbush	R	NY-18	March 4, 1889	1st term	
287	John Quinn	D	NY-11	March 4, 1889	1st term	Left the House in 1891.
288	John Raines	R	NY-29	March 4, 1889	1st term	
289	Charles S. Randall	R	MA-01	March 4, 1889	1st term	
290	Joseph Warren Ray	R	PA-24	March 4, 1889	1st term	Left the House in 1891.
291	Joseph Rea Reed	R	IA-09	March 4, 1889	1st term	Left the House in 1891.
292	James Bernard Reilly	D	PA-13	March 4, 1889; Previous service, 1875–1879.	3rd term*	
293	John Winebrenner Rife	R	PA-14	March 4, 1889	1st term	
294	John Sanford	R	NY-20	March 4, 1889	1st term	
295	Isaac W. Van Schaick	R	WI-04	March 4, 1889; Previous service, 1885–1887.	2nd term*	Left the House in 1891.
296	Joseph A. Scranton	R	PA-11	March 4, 1889; Previous service, 1881–1883 and 1885–1887.	3rd term**	Left the House in 1891.
297	William E. Simonds	R	CT-01	March 4, 1889	1st term	Left the House in 1891.
298	Thomas Gregory Skinner	D	NC-01	March 4, 1889; Previous service, 1883–1887.	3rd term*	Left the House in 1891.
299	George W. Smith	R	IL-20	March 4, 1889	1st term	
300	Martin L. Smyser	R	OH-20	March 4, 1889	1st term	Left the House in 1891.
301	Samuel Snider	R	MN-04	March 4, 1889	1st term	Left the House in 1891.
302	Samuel M. Stephenson	R	MI-11	March 4, 1889	1st term	
303	Moses D. Stivers	R	NY-15	March 4, 1889	1st term	Left the House in 1891.
304	Henry Stockbridge Jr.	R	MD-04	March 4, 1889	1st term	Left the House in 1891.
305	Herman Stump	D	MD-02	March 4, 1889	1st term	
306	Joseph Henry Sweney	R	IA-04	March 4, 1889	1st term	Left the House in 1891.
307	John Charles Tarsney	D	MO-05	March 4, 1889	1st term	
308	Abner Taylor	R	IL-01	March 4, 1889	1st term	
309	Alfred A. Taylor	R	TN-01	March 4, 1889	1st term	
310	Charles Champlain Townsend	R	PA-25	March 4, 1889	1st term	Left the House in 1891.
311	Hosea Townsend	R	CO	March 4, 1889	1st term	
312	Henry St. George Tucker III	D	VA-10	March 4, 1889	1st term	
313	Louis Washington Turpin	D	AL-04	March 4, 1889	1st term	Resigned on June 4, 1890.
314	Edward Carrington Venable	D	VA-04	March 4, 1889	1st term	Resigned on September 23, 1890.
315	Rodney Wallace	R	MA-11	March 4, 1889	1st term	Left the House in 1891.
316	William C. Wallace	R	NY-03	March 4, 1889	1st term	Left the House in 1891.
317	Joseph H. Walker	R	MA-10	March 4, 1889	1st term	
318	Lewis Findlay Watson	R	PA-27	March 4, 1889; Previous service, 1877–1879 and 1881–1883.	3rd term**	Died on August 25, 1890.
319	Frank W. Wheeler	R	MI-10	March 4, 1889	1st term	Left the House in 1891.
320	Scott Wike	D	IL-12	March 4, 1889; Previous service, 1875–1877.	2nd term*	
321	John M. Wiley	D	NY-33	March 4, 1889	1st term	Left the House in 1891.
322	Washington F. Willcox	D	CT-02	March 4, 1889	1st term	
323	John Henry Wilson	R	KY-10	March 4, 1889	1st term	
324	Myron Benjamin Wright	R	PA-15	March 4, 1889	1st term	
	Oscar S. Gifford	R	SD	November 2, 1889; Previous service, 1885–1889.	3rd term*	Left the House in 1891.
	Henry C. Hansbrough	R	ND	November 2, 1889	1st term	Left the House in 1891.
	John Pickler	R	SD	November 2, 1889	1st term	
	Amos J. Cummings	D	NY-09	November 5, 1889; Previous service, 1887–1889.	2nd term*	
	Thomas H. Carter	R	MT	November 8, 1889	1st term	Left the House in 1891.
	John L. Wilson	R	WA	November 20, 1889	1st term	
	Harrison Kelley	R	KS-04	December 2, 1889	1st term	Left the House in 1891.
	Gilbert L. Laws	R	NE-02	December 2, 1889	1st term	Left the House in 1891.
	Sereno E. Payne	R	NY-27	December 2, 1889; Previous service, 1883–1887.	3rd term*	
	Andrew Price	D	LA-03	December 2, 1889	1st term	
	James R. Williams	D	IL-19	December 2, 1889	1st term	
	Robert Patterson Clark Wilson	D	MO-04	December 2, 1889	1st term	
	Charles H. Turner	D	NY-06	December 9, 1889	1st term	Left the House in 1891.
	Charles Brooks Smith	R	WV-04	February 3, 1890	1st term	Left the House in 1891.
	John E. Reyburn	R	PA-04	February 18, 1890	1st term	
	George W. Atkinson	R	WV-01	February 26, 1890	1st term	Left the House in 1891.
	Lewis P. Featherstone	L	AR-01	March 5, 1890	1st term	Left the House in 1891.
	Sydney Emanuel Mudd I	D	MD-05	March 20, 1890	1st term	Left the House in 1891.
	Edmund Waddill Jr.	R	VA-03	April 12, 1890	1st term	Left the House in 1891.
	Richard Vaux	D	PA-03	May 20, 1890	1st term	Left the House in 1891.
	John V. McDuffie	R	AL-04	June 4, 1890	1st term	Left the House in 1891.
	William Worth Dickerson	D	KY-06	June 21, 1890	1st term	
	John Mercer Langston	R	VA-04	September 23, 1890	1st term	Left the House in 1891.
	Thomas E. Miller	R	SC-07	September 24, 1890	1st term	Left the House in 1891.
	Willis Sweet	R	ID	October 1, 1890	1st term	
	Edward R. Hays	R	IA-07	November 4, 1890	1st term	Left the House in 1891.
	John S. Pindar	D	NY-24	November 4, 1890; Previous service, 1885–1887.	2nd term*	Left the House in 1891.
	Charles Warren Stone	R	PA-27	November 4, 1890	1st term	
	Robert Henry Whitelaw	D	MO-14	November 4, 1890	1st term	Left the House in 1891.
	Clarence D. Clark	R	WY	December 1, 1890	1st term	
	Thomas J. Geary	D	CA-01	December 9, 1890	1st term	

== Delegates ==
Rank	Delegate	Party	District	Seniority date (Previous service, if any)	No.# of term(s)	Notes
1	John Thomas Caine	D	UT	November 7, 1882	5th term	
2	Joseph M. Carey	R	WY	March 4, 1885	3rd term	
3	Antonio Joseph	D	NM	March 4, 1885	3rd term	
4	Fred Dubois	R	ID	March 4, 1887	2nd term	
5	Marcus A. Smith	D	AZ	March 4, 1887	2nd term	
6	George A. Mathews	R	DAK	March 4, 1889	1st term	
7	Thomas H. Carter	R	MT	March 4, 1889	1st term	
8	John B. Allen	R	WA	March 4, 1889	1st term	
9	David Archibald Harvey	R	OK	November 4, 1890	1st term	

== See also ==
- 51st United States Congress
- List of United States congressional districts
- List of United States senators in the 51st Congress
