= Otha Wearin =

American politician (1903–1990)

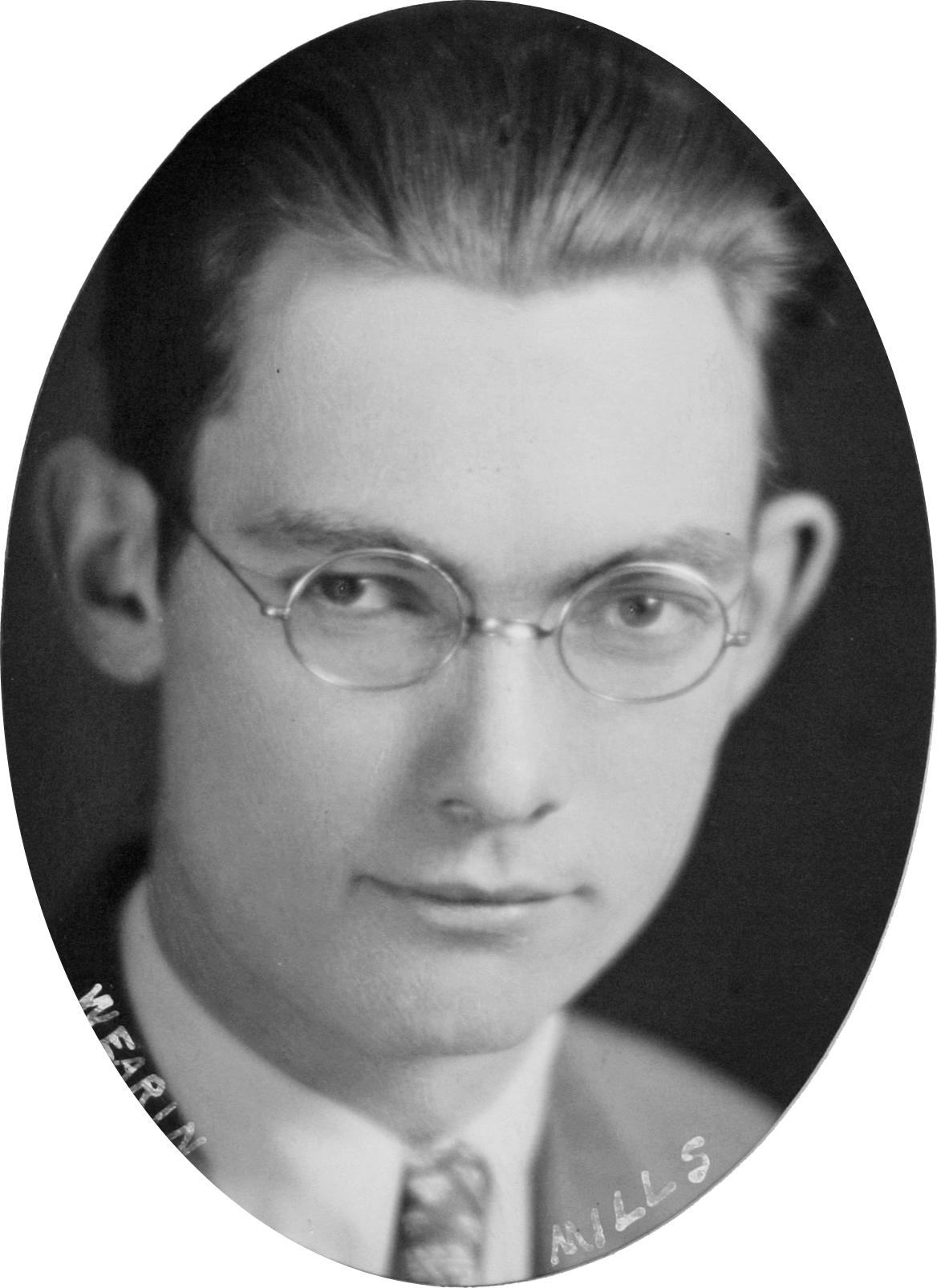
- Wearin c. 1929

Member of the U.S. House of Representatives from Iowa's 7th district
- In office March 4, 1933 – January 3, 1939
- Preceded by: Cassius C. Dowell
- Succeeded by: Ben F. Jensen

Member of the Iowa House of Representatives from the Mills County district
- In office January 14, 1929 – January 8, 1933
- Preceded by: Roy Haney
- Succeeded by: Rudolph Carl Nicholas Hopp

Personal details
- Born: January 10, 1903 Hastings, Iowa, U.S.
- Died: April 3, 1990 (aged 87) Glenwood, Iowa, U.S.
- Resting place: Malvern, Iowa, U.S.
- Party: Democratic
- Relatives: Albert Benjamin Washburn (uncle); Henry W. Washburn (cousin); Edward Anderson Wearin (cousin)
- Education: Grinnell College
- Occupation: Writer, cattleman

Otha Donner Wearin (January 10, 1903 – April 3, 1990) was an American writer and politician. Elected as the youngest member of President Franklin D. Roosevelt's first "New Deal" Congress, his political career stalled in 1938 when he gave up his seat in the United States House of Representatives at Roosevelt's urging to run for a U.S. Senate seat held by another Democrat, Guy Gillette, but primary voters rallied behind Gillette. He became a prolific writer, which led to his election to the Cowboy Hall of Fame.

== Personal background ==
Wearin was born on a farm near Hastings, Iowa, in Mills County, and graduated from Grinnell College in Grinnell, Iowa. While returning to Mills County to farm, the reputation he developed as a writer helped to jump-start his political career. He travelled to Europe to inspect their farming methods, which he described in articles printed in rural Iowa newspapers and published in his first book, "An Iowa Farmer Abroad." By age 25, a newspaper reported that he had already "gained prominence as a farm bureau speaker and writer in the past few years." Later that year he was elected to the Iowa House of Representatives as a Democrat, even though his home county was a traditional Republican stronghold and the influence of native-son presidential candidate Herbert Hoover at the top of the Republican ticket led to Republican gains throughout Iowa. He served two terms in the Iowa House, winning re-election in 1930.

== Congress ==
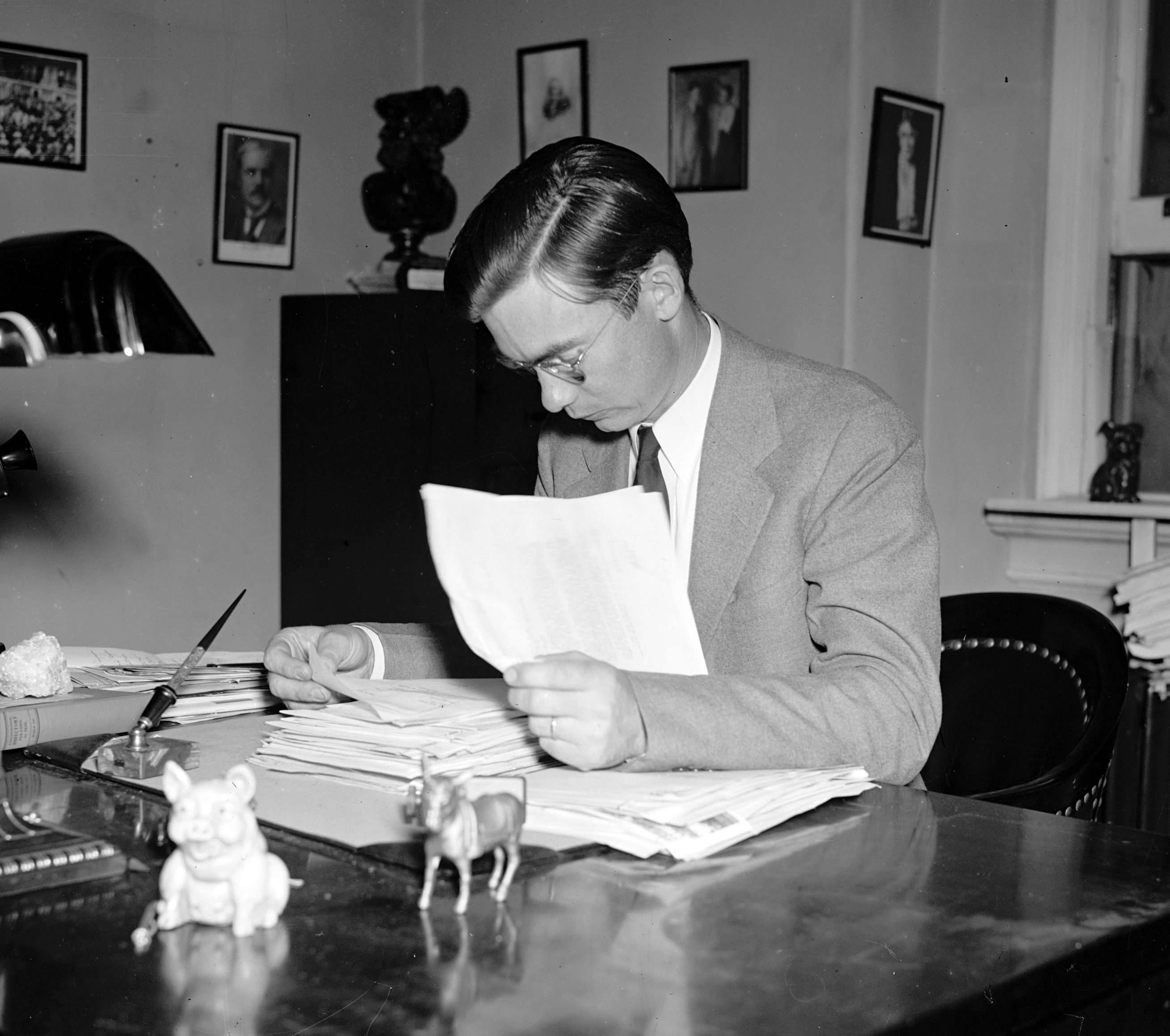
Wearin in Congress c. 1937

In 1932, he became the first Democrat ever to win election to the U.S. House of Representatives from Iowa's 7th congressional district. At twenty-nine years old, he was the youngest member of Congress. During his tenure, Wearin was known for his progressive ideals.

He was re-elected in 1934 and in 1936, but by increasingly narrow margins in the general elections. In 1938, he sought the Democratic nomination for U.S. Senate, having the support of President Franklin D. Roosevelt, who was trying to purge Senator Guy M. Gillette, but he lost in the primary.

== Later election bids ==
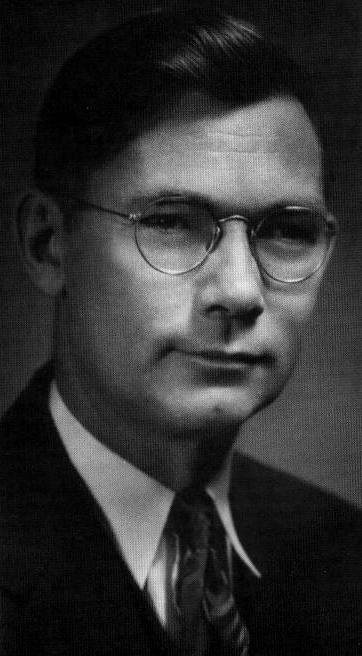
Wearin c. 1950

In 1950, he made a second unsuccessful attempt to win the Democratic nomination for U.S. Senate. He finished a distant third in the primary, behind Al Loveland and Nelson Kraschel. In 1952 he sought unsuccessfully the Democratic nomination for Governor of Iowa, losing in the primary to Herschel C. Loveless.

In 1969, after Charles Vernon Lisle resigned one year before his Iowa Senate term ended, Wearin was nominated by his party as the Democratic candidate in the special election to succeed Lisle. However, Wearin's Republican opponent, Earl Bass, won the election.

== After politics ==
After the end of his active political career, Wearin raised purebred Angus cattle on the 1,000-acre (4.0 km^{2}) family estate, "Nishna Vale," near Hastings. Despite deterioration of his eyesight, he wrote books and articles, studied Iowa history, and worked in conservation.

As a writer of westerns, his books include Before the Colors Fade, (1971), Along Our Country Road, (1985), I Remember Yesteryear (1974), Heinhold's First and Last Chance Saloon: Jack London's Rendezvous (1974) and Grass Grown Trails (1981). His writings were cited in his 1985 induction into the Cowboy Hall of Fame. Outside of that genre, he wrote many other books, including Century on an Iowa Farm (1959), I Remember Hastings (1965), Political Americana (1967), Clarence Arthur Ellsworth,: Artist of the Old West, 1885-1964, (1967) Country Roads to Washington (1976), and Rhymes of a Plain Countryman (1980).

He died at Glenwood, Iowa, and is buried at Malvern, Iowa.

U.S. House of Representatives
| Preceded by Cassius C. Dowell | Member of the U.S. House of Representatives from Iowa's 7th congressional district March 4, 1933 – January 3, 1939 (obsolete district) | Succeeded by Ben F. Jensen |
