= Albert Washburn =

Albert Washburn may refer to:

- Albert Benjamin Washburn (1869–1942), American politician from Iowa
- Albert Henry Washburn (1866–1930), American lawyer and diplomat
- Albert Lincoln Washburn (1911–2007), American geomorphologist
