= Henry Washburn =

Henry Washburn may refer to:

- Henry Bradford Washburn (1910–2007), American mountaineer
- Henry D. Washburn (1832–1871), American politician from Indiana
- Henry W. Washburn (1899–1983), American politician from Iowa
