= John R. Hansen =

American politician (1901–1974)

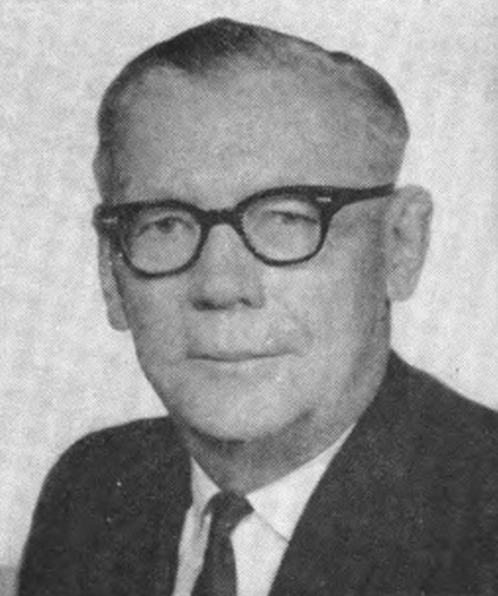

Member of the U.S. House of Representatives from Iowa's 7th district
- In office January 3, 1965 – January 3, 1967
- Preceded by: Ben F. Jensen
- Succeeded by: William J. Scherle

Personal details
- Born: August 24, 1901 Manning, Iowa, United States
- Died: September 23, 1974 (aged 73) Des Moines, Iowa
- Party: Democratic
- Profession: Businessman

John Robert Hansen (August 24, 1901 – September 23, 1974) served one term, from January 3, 1965 to January 3, 1967, as a Democratic U.S. representative from Iowa. Until the election of Cindy Axne in 2018, he and Tom Harkin were the only two Democrats to have represented southwestern Iowa in the U.S. House since the end of the Great Depression.

== Early life ==
A native and lifelong resident of Manning, Iowa, Hansen attended the Manning public schools. He attended the University of Iowa from 1919 to 1921. He and his wife Mary Lou were the parents of two children, Robert and Jack.

== Career ==
After serving as a sales representative, general manager, and president of Dultmeier Manufacturing Co., of Manning, Iowa from 1921 to 1962, he served as president of Dultmeier Sales, in Omaha, Nebraska, from 1934 to 1957.

Hansen had been politically active in Democratic politics for many years. He served as member of the Carroll County Democratic Central Committee from 1932 to 1944, and as its chairman from 1944 to 1952. He served as district committeeman on the Democratic State Central Committee from 1952 to 1957, and as Sixth Congressional District Democratic chairman from 1953 to 1957. He was twice a delegate to Democratic National Convention, in 1948 and 1964. He served as the Democratic nominee for Lieutenant Governor in 1960, but lost to W.L. Mooty.

Hansen also served in several appointive positions in Iowa state government. He served as member of the Board of Control of State Institutions from 1957 to 1960. He also was a member of executive council of the Governor's Alcoholism Commission and the Commission on Interstate Cooperation from 1957 to 1960.

In 1963, Hansen's close friend, Harold Hughes, was elected Governor of Iowa. When Hansen ran for the Democratic nomination for the Iowa's 7th congressional district in 1964, the vote was forced to a convention after none of the six candidates received over 35 percent of the vote in a primary. In the convention, on the ninth ballot, Hansen won the Democratic nomination without a single vote to spare.

In the 1964 general election (when Democratic President Lyndon B. Johnson defeated Republican Barry Goldwater by a landslide, and the Democratic majority in the House increased by 48 seats), Hansen defeated longtime Republican incumbent Ben F. Jensen. However, Hansen was one of many Midwestern Democrats elected to Congress from Republican-leaning districts in 1964 who served only a single term. In 1966 Hansen was defeated in his run for re-election by William Scherle, a conservative Republican member of the Iowa House of Representatives from Mills County, Iowa.

After returning from Washington, Hansen served as member of the Iowa State Highway Commission, from February 1967 until retirement on July 1, 1969. He died in Des Moines, Iowa, on September 23, 1974. He was interred in Manning Cemetery, Manning, Iowa.

U.S. House of Representatives
Preceded by Ben F. Jensen	Member of the U.S. House of Representatives from Iowa's 7th congressional district January 3, 1965 – January 3, 1967 (obsolete district)	Succeeded by William J. Scherle
