= Hiram Y. Smith =

American politician

Hiram Smith
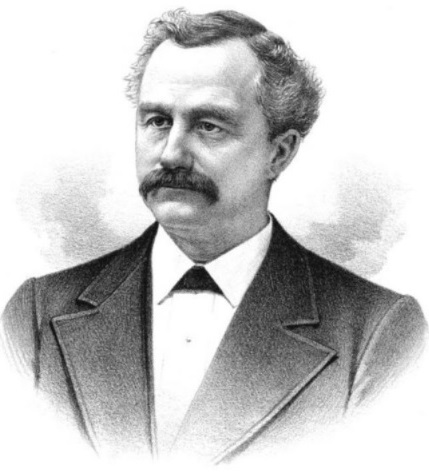

Member of the U.S. House of Representatives from Iowa's 7th district
- In office December 2, 1884 – March 3, 1885
- Preceded by: John A. Kasson
- Succeeded by: Edwin H. Conger

Personal details
- Born: March 22, 1843 Piqua, Ohio, U.S.
- Died: November 4, 1894 (aged 51) Des Moines, Iowa, U.S
- Party: Republican
- Education: University at Albany

Hiram Ypsilanti Smith (March 22, 1843 – November 4, 1894) was a nineteenth-century Republican politician, lawyer and clerk from Iowa. For three months, he represented Iowa's 7th congressional district in the U.S. House of Representatives, after winning election to serve out the term of John A. Kasson following Kasson's appointment as U.S. Envoy to Germany.

== Biography ==
Born in Piqua, Ohio, Smith moved to Rock Island, Illinois with his parents in 1850 and again to Des Moines, Iowa in 1854. He attended public schools and enlisted in the Iowa Militia for service against the Indians in 1861. He was appointed a clerk in the Post Office Department in 1862, serving until 1864 when he was transferred to the Treasury Department, serving there until 1865.

Smith graduated from the Albany Law School in 1866 and was admitted to the bar later the same year, commencing practice in Des Moines. He served as district attorney of the fifth judicial district of Iowa from 1875 to 1879, and was a member of the Iowa Senate from 1882 to 1884.

In 1884, Smith became a candidate for the Republican nomination to succeed retiring Republican Congressman (and former Ambassador to Austria-Hungary) John A. Kasson as representative for Iowa's 7th congressional district. Smith's closest competitor for the nomination was Iowa State Treasurer Edwin H. Conger, Smith's former law-school classmate. However, in August 1884, Kasson left Congress early when President Chester A. Arthur selected him as the next envoy to Germany. This appointment required a double election in the 7th district in November 1884 - the regular election to pick a representative for the upcoming Forty-ninth Congress, and a special election of a representative to serve out the remainder of Kasson's term in the Forty-eighth Congress. By the time of the district nominating convention, Smith ran only for the shorter term, and Conger ran only for the longer term. Smith (and Conger) were nominated and defeated their opponents in the November election.

Smith served in the lame-duck session, from December 2, 1884 to March 3, 1885. Afterwards, Smith resumed practicing law until his death in Des Moines on November 4, 1894. He was interred in Woodland Cemetery in Des Moines.

U.S. House of Representatives
| Preceded by John A. Kasson | Member of the U.S. House of Representatives from Iowa's 7th congressional district December 2, 1884 – March 3, 1885 (obsolete district) | Succeeded by Edwin H. Conger |
