= Sarah Pike Conger =

American writer (1843–1932)

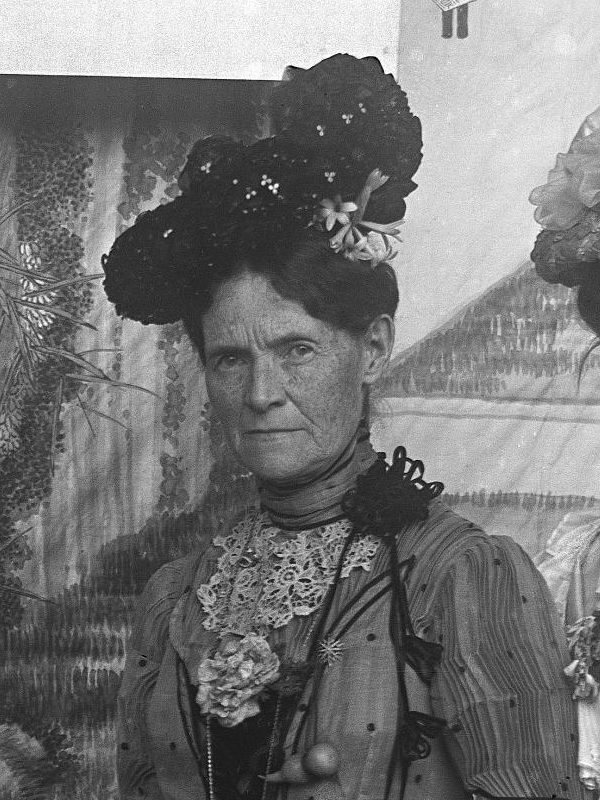
- Pike Conger, pictured in 1903
- Born: July 24, 1843 Ohio, United States
- Died: February 1932 (aged 88) Concord, New Hampshire, US
- Resting place: Altadena, California
- Occupation: Author
- Language: English
- Spouse: Edwin H. Conger
- Children: 2

Sarah Pike Conger (July 24, 1843 – February 1932) was an American writer. She was married to American diplomat Edwin H. Conger and accompanied him on his postings as envoy and minister to Brazil (1890–93, 1897–98) and China (1898–1905). Pike Conger developed an interest in Chinese culture and maintained a collection of ethnographic artifacts. The couple survived the 1900 Siege of the International Legations, during the Boxer Rebellion, and afterwards remained in the legation quarter. Pike Conger met frequently with Empress Dowager Cixi, whom she considered a friend, and was criticized for this in the press as Cixi had supported the Boxers. After returning to the United States and the death of her husband, Pike Conger wrote a recollection of her time in China and a children's book about Chinese culture.

== Early life ==
Pike Conger was born in Ohio, United States, on July 24, 1843, to Edward and Laura Bainbridge Pike. Shortly afterwards she moved with her parents to Galesburg, Illinois, where they helped to found the Universalist Church's Lombard College. Pike Conger's parents encouraged her to seek a formal education, and she graduated from the college in 1863. At Lombard College she was in a relationship with Edwin H. Conger, who graduated the year before her. The couple married at Galesburg in 1866.

Edwin Conger was a lawyer and politician before becoming a diplomat. Pike Conger accompanied her husband on foreign postings, the first of which was appointment as envoy extraordinary and minister plenipotentiary to Brazil in September 1890, which was Pike Conger's first trip abroad. Her husband served until 1893 but had a second period in the posting from 1897 to 1898. In January 1894 Pike Conger joined the Church of Christ, Scientist and was a frequent correspondent of its founder Mary Baker Eddy. The couple had one son, Lorentus (born 1870) who died at the age of seven, and a daughter, Laura (born 1868).

== China ==
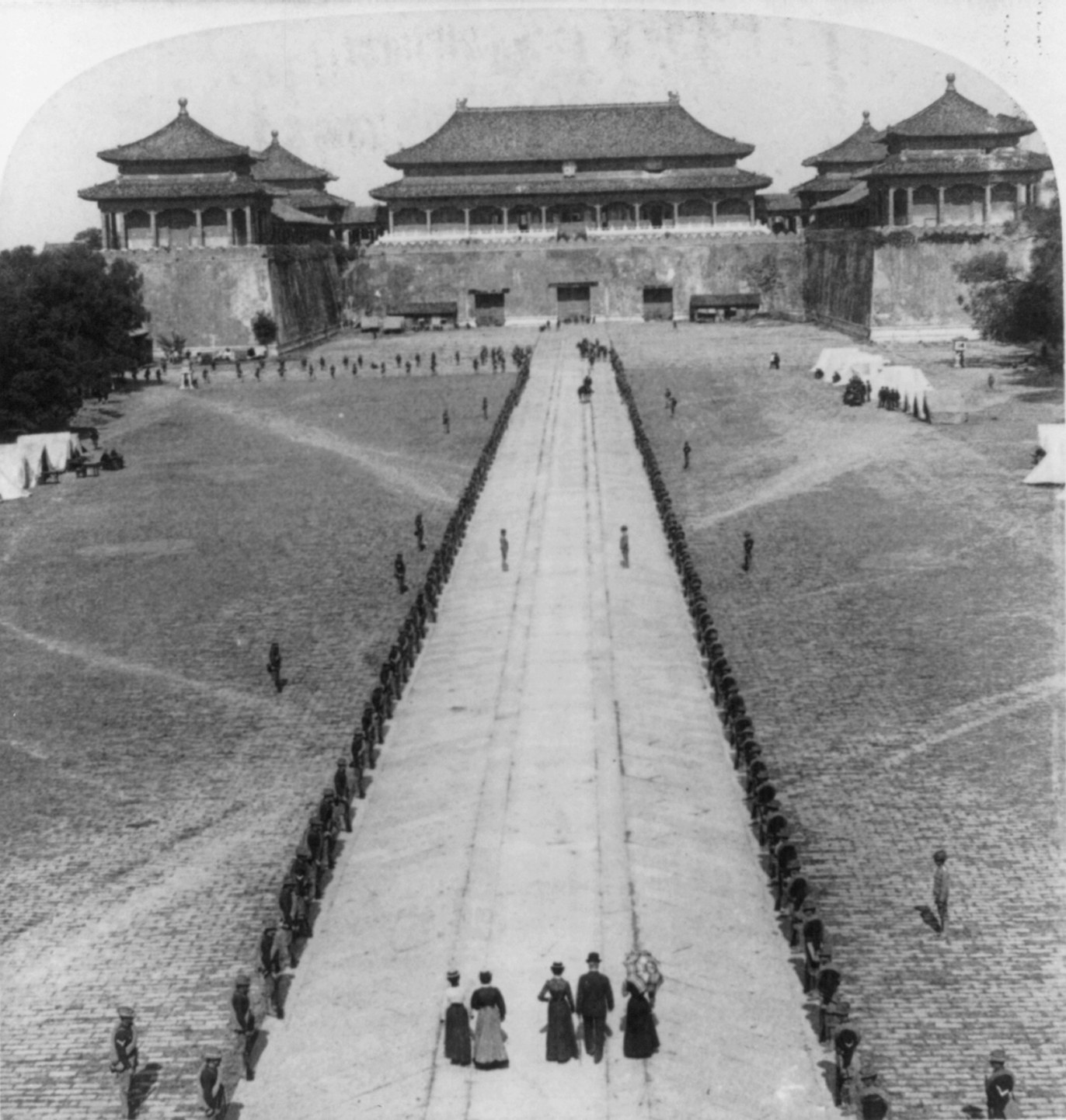
Pike Conger with her husband and other family members, before the Meridian Gate of the Forbidden City, Peking, in 1901. The US 9th Infantry Regiment lines the approach to honour German Field Marshal Alfred von Waldersee.

Edwin Conger was appointed Envoy Extraordinary and Minister Plenipotentiary to the Great Qing Empire (China) in January 1898, and the family moved to Beijing (then known as Peking), arriving that summer.

Pike Conger developed an interest in the everyday lives of Chinese people and, in particular, their women who were by Confucian custom largely kept out of public view inside their houses and courtyards. She learnt much about Chinese customs from the American ministry's Chinese butler, Wang, and received advice on formal ceremony from the American William Pethick, secretary to Chinese statesman Li Hongzhang. Wang took her to celebrations of the Mid-Autumn Festival, breaking ethnic, gender and class boundaries to do so. Pike Conger adopted some Chinese customs such as the keeping of a Buddha statue and trees decorated with auspicious symbols in the ministry.

Pike Conger collected Japanese, Korean and Chinese ethnographic artifacts, many of them gifts from the Empress Dowager Cixi, a powerful figure in that period of Chinese history who exerted considerable influence over her nephew, the Guangxu Emperor. Pike Conger had first met Cixi on December 18, 1898, at an audience for the wives of foreign ministers. Pike Conger noted "she was bright and happy and her face glowed with good will. There was no trace of cruelty to be seen".

In late 1899 the anti-foreign and anti-Christian Boxer Rebellion broke out, which came to be supported by Cixi. Chinese Christians and foreign nationals were killed, and many sought refuge in the Beijing Legation Quarter. On June 18, 1900, the Chinese government ordered the foreign ministries to leave the city, but the diplomats decided to remain and endured a lengthy siege.

During the siege, Pike Conger assisted the defense by making sandbags, tearing up clothes to make bandages and carrying supplies. As a strongly religious woman she also helped to minister to other defenders, becoming known as the "fairy godmother" of the defense. The Beijing legations were relieved on August 14, 1900, though the wider rebellion continued until late 1901.

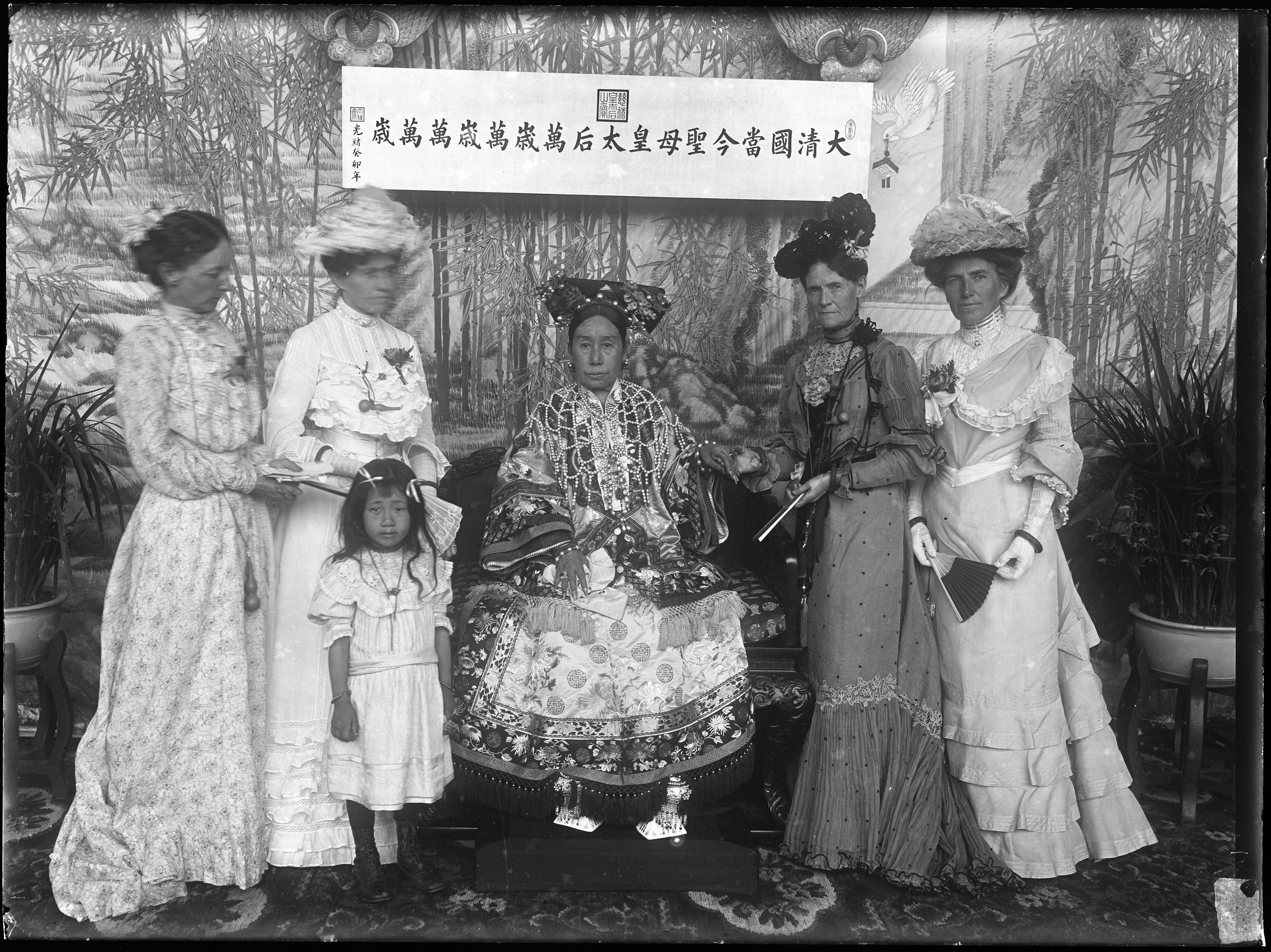
Pike Conger holding the hand of Cixi, with other diplomatic wives and the photographer's daughter Lily, 1903

The Congers remained in Beijing afterwards. Cixi went into exile but returned in early 1902. She was held in distrust by many of the diplomats, but Pike Conger and other foreign women disobeyed their husbands to attend a formal audience on February 1, 1902. Pike Conger was the only woman present who had endured the siege, and in a speech made during the audience she asked for "more frank, more trustful, and more friendly relations with foreign people".

Pike Conger afterwards met often with Cixi, whom she considered a friend, and persuaded her to sit for her first Western-style portrait. She also had influence on government policy, successfully advising Cixi to issue orders that selected Chinese boys should be educated abroad and supporting the education of girls in China. For her closeness to Cixi, Pike Conger was demonized in the American press, which claimed she was too quick to forget the horrors of the rebellion.

Edwin Conger's posting ended in 1905, and the family returned to the United States. At a final audience with Cixi, Pike Conger was given a Tang dynasty red jade good-luck amulet which Cixi had been wearing. The Dowager Empress wore the amulet on her flight from Beijing during the Boxer Rebellion and in her subsequent exile. The pair remained frequent correspondents and, before her 1908 death, Cixi sent Pike Conger gifts for her granddaughter and also a significant financial donation for the rebuilding of San Francisco after the 1906 earthquake.

== Later life ==
The Congers settled in Pasadena, California, where Edwin died on May 18, 1907, of ill health, that had been exacerbated by his experiences during the siege. Pike Conger became a writer and in 1909 published, in Chicago, Letters from China about her life in that country. It was followed, in 1913, by Old China and Young America, a children's book celebrating Chinese culture. Pike Conger died in February 1932 at the Christian Science Pleasant View Home in Concord, New Hampshire. She is buried beside her husband in Altadena, California.

A collection of Pike Conger's papers are held by the library of Knox College, Illinois. Knox College was closely associated with Lombard College, which closed in 1931. Pike Conger's personal papers and surviving ethnographic artifacts were donated by her granddaughter to the Peabody Museum of Archaeology and Ethnology in 1991.

== Publications ==
- Letters from China (Chicago: A.C. McClurg & Co. 1909)
- Old China and Young America (Chicago: F.G. Browne & Co. 1913)
