= Fleming D. Cheshire =

American businessman and diplomat (1849–1922)

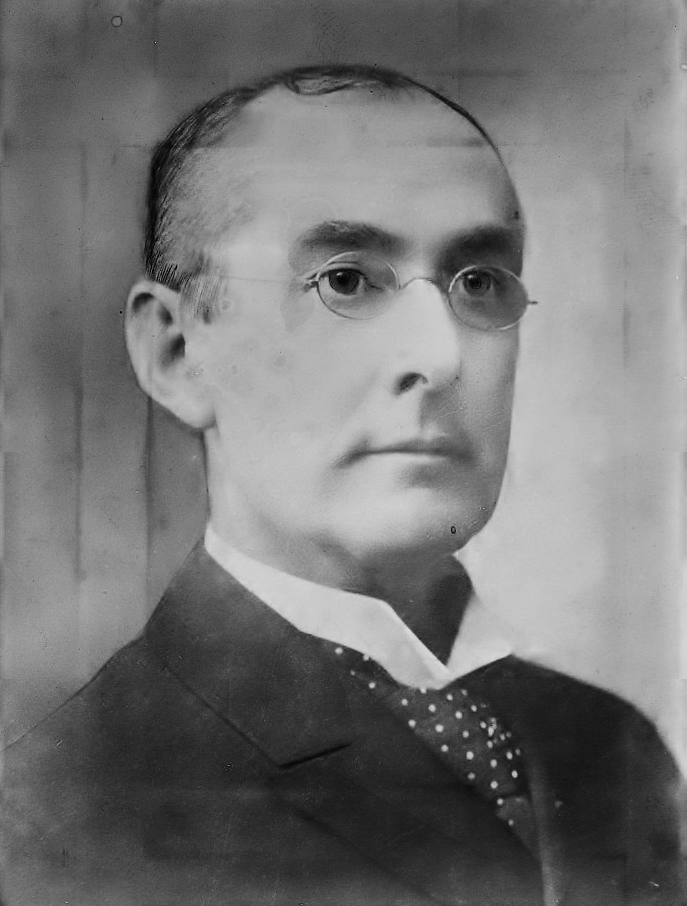
Fleming Duncan Cheshire

Fleming Duncan Cheshire (March 4, 1849 – June 13, 1922), also known as Fleming D. Cheshire, was an American businessman, foreign language interpreter and Consul-General of the United States to China. As the Chinese Secretary to legation during the Boxer Rebellion, Cheshire and other western diplomatic legations were under siege in Beijing until rescued by the China Relief Expedition. In the rebellion's aftermath, Cheshire was instrumental in the adoption of America's first educational exchange program with China and oversaw the commencement of trade relations between the two nations. Fleming D. Cheshire served in the Consular Service of the United States for 38 years. He is the grand-uncle of jazz musician Andrew Cheshire.

== Early life and career ==
Fleming Duncan Cheshire was born in Brooklyn, New York, to Jonas Cheshire, a ferry boat captain and later a Brooklyn court officer, and to Maria (née Havens), a homemaker. He was named after Fleming Duncan, his father's friend and partner in the ferry boat business. Attending school at both public and private institutions, Cheshire completed his academic education in 1869. In the same year, he entered into the mercantile business in China working for Russell and Co. and Augustine Heard & Co. In 1870 he was sent by Augustine Heard and Co. to Peking to study Chinese. Cheshire eventually became fluent in both Mandarin and Cantonese, as well as other dialects. While learning Mandarin in Peking (Beijing) he shaved his head, wore a pigtail, and dressed in traditional Chinese clothing. Cheshire thought that his facility with Chinese would not have been possible if he hadn't lived among the Chinese and adopted their way of life. He was appointed acting interpreter to the American consulate at Fuzhou in 1877 and was in charge of the consulate at Fuzhou in 1878-1879 and at Canton in 1879–1880. In 1882, Cheshire was appointed consulate-general in Shanghai and was acting interpreter to the American legation at Peking between 1884 and 1899.

== The Boxer Rebellion ==
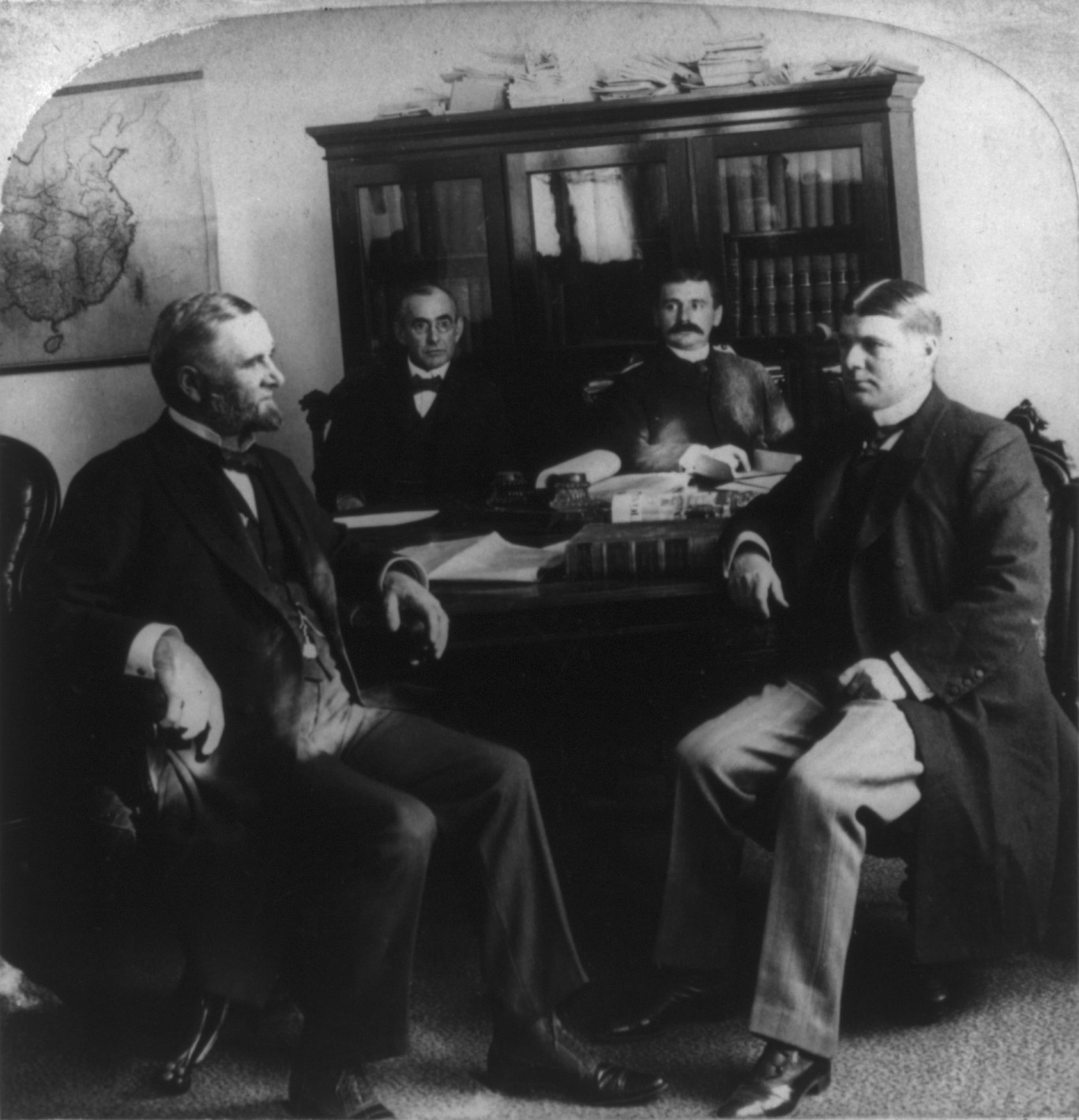
American legation at Beijing circa 1901. (left to right) Edwin H. Conger, Fleming D. Cheshire, William E. Bainbridge, H.G.Squiers

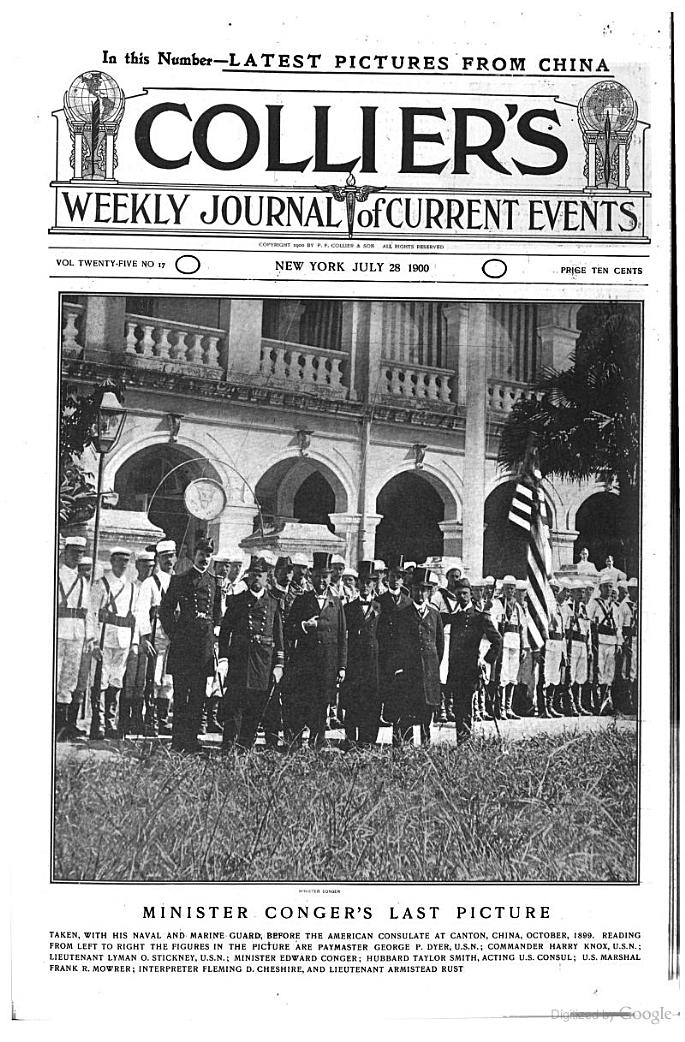
Cheshire (second from left) with Conger (center) reported as killed in Colliers weekly July 28, 1900

On May 6, 1900, someone hurled a rock through the window of the Presbyterian ministry at Peking, almost striking the head of one of the servants within. Acting as interpreter for ambassador Edwin H. Conger, Cheshire was sent to the Tsungli Yamen (the Chinese Foreign Office) to protest the incident. On the way Cheshire noticed that anti-foreign placards were being posted near the ministry by Chinese civilians and that the Boxers were practicing their acrobatics and sword twirling rituals in the neighborhood of the compound while the Chinese authorities did little or nothing to stop the acts. As the days progressed more attacks followed, becoming more pronounced and violent in nature. On June 19, the German minister was murdered en route to Tsungli Yamen by a Manchurian guard and with this news, all diplomats took refuge at the legation compound. During the 55-day siege, most civilians of the various foreign legations took refuge in the British Compound, which was larger and more easily defended than the rest. Cheshire was said to have displayed courageous and inspiring conduct within the walls of the compound joining a group of about 150 men to defend it.

In the weeks ahead more violent attacks ensued and by late June, American newspapers were reporting that Congers, Cheshire, and all other Americans in Peking had been killed. By July 14, with more than one third of the legation killed or wounded, the Chinese government forwarded a conciliatory response thus marking the beginning to the end of the rebellion.

== Later career ==
After the Boxer Rebellion, Cheshire served as the Chinese secretary to the special plenipotentiary (ambassador) of the United States, and was appointed consul-general at Mukden, Manchuria from 1904–1906. Unhappy with the general lack of security and relatively poor standard of living at the American consulate compounds in China, Cheshire returned stateside in early 1906 to meet with State Department officials about securing a portion of the indemnity collected from the Boxer Rebellion to erect dignified quarters for all those living within the walls of the American consulates throughout China. On July 1, 1906, Cheshire was nominated by Theodore Roosevelt as Consul-General at large, where he oversaw inspections at the various consulates throughout China. He kept this post until 1911. Cheshire's last appointment was as Consul-General at Canton from 1912 to 1915.

One of the oldest members of the American diplomatic service and having lived amongst the Chinese for nearly four decades, Fleming D. Cheshire was considered one of the best interpreters in the Chinese empire. In 1899, Minister Edwin H. Conger wrote that "Mr. Cheshire has been with the legation [at Peking] for fifteen years, is more than fifty years old, and if he should resign, it would be almost impossible to fill his place." Coming from a mercantile background and being acutely aware of China's thirst for American goods, Cheshire often illuminated the huge potential for trade between the two nations by conferring with state department officials, lecturing American businessmen and granting interviews to the press.

== Final years and death ==
On a brief visit to New York in December 1915, Cheshire was stricken by paralysis brought on by a stroke. Although his physicians thought recovery possible, he was advised to give up his government appointed post in China. Never fully recovering from his stroke, Fleming D. Cheshire died in a New York hospital on June 13, 1922. He is interred at Cypress Hills Cemetery, Brooklyn, NY.
