= Ben F. Jensen =

American politician (1892–1970)

Ben Jensen
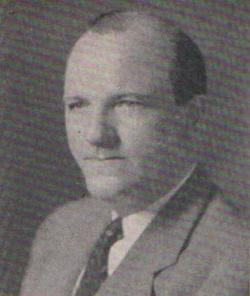

Member of the U.S. House of Representatives from Iowa's 7th district
- In office January 3, 1939 – January 3, 1965
- Preceded by: Otha Wearin
- Succeeded by: John R. Hansen

Personal details
- Born: Benton Franklin Jensen; December 16, 1892 Marion, Iowa, U.S.
- Died: February 5, 1970 (aged 77) Washington, D.C., U.S.
- Party: Republican

Military service
- Allegiance: United States of America
- Branch/service: United States Army
- Rank: Second lieutenant
- Battles/wars: World War I

Benton Franklin Jensen (December 16, 1892 – February 5, 1970) served thirteen consecutive terms as a U.S. representative from Iowa's 7th congressional district in the southwestern corner of the state. While on the floor of the U.S. House on March 1, 1954, he was one of five congressmen wounded by gunfire from a Puerto Rican Nationalists firing from a visitors' gallery.

== Biography ==
Born in Marion, Iowa, Jensen was the tenth of thirteen children born to Danish immigrant parents. He attended the rural high schools. From 1914 to 1917, he was employed by a lumber company as yardman and assistant auditor. In 1918, he served as a second lieutenant during World War I. Upon his return from the war, he served as manager of a lumber company for nearly twenty years.

In 1938, Jensen was elected as a Republican to represent Iowa's 7th congressional district in the U.S. House of Representatives. He was re-elected twelve times, serving continuously from January 3, 1939 to January 3, 1965. Jensen did not vote on the Civil Rights Act of 1957, and voted against the Civil Rights Acts of 1960 and 1964, but voted in favor of the 24th Amendment to the U.S. Constitution which outlawed the poll tax in all federal-level elections.

In the 1954 United States Capitol shooting, Jensen was shot in the back near his right shoulder. The bullet was removed the following day. He fully recovered, and served ten more years in Congress. However, during the 1964 Democratic landslide, he was defeated by Democrat John R. Hansen. He then returned home to Exira, Iowa.

Jensen died in Washington, D.C., on February 5, 1970, and was interred in Exira Cemetery. The papers of Ben F. Jensen were given to the University of Iowa Libraries in 1967.

== See also ==
- List of members of the United States Congress killed or wounded in office

U.S. House of Representatives
Preceded by Otha Wearin	Member of the U.S. House of Representatives from Iowa's 7th congressional district 1939–1965	Succeeded by John R. Hansen
