= Henry J. B. Cummings =

American journalist

Henry Cummings
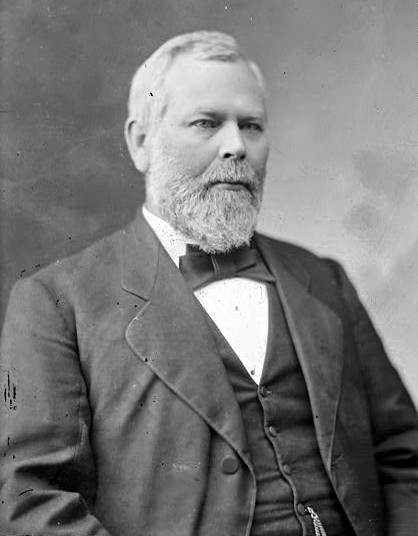

Member of the U.S. House of Representatives from Iowa's 7th district
- In office March 4, 1877 – March 3, 1879
- Preceded by: John A. Kasson
- Succeeded by: Edward H. Gillette

Personal details
- Born: Henry Johnson Brodhead Cummings; May 21, 1831 Newton, New Jersey, U.S.
- Died: April 16, 1909 (aged 77) Winterset, Iowa, U.S.
- Party: Republican

Military service
- Branch/service: Union Army
- Years of service: 1861-1864
- Rank: Colonel
- Unit: 39th Iowa Infantry Regiment; Company F, 4th Iowa Infantry Regiment
- Battles/wars: Civil War

Henry Johnson Brodhead Cummings (May 21, 1831 – April 16, 1909) was an American lawyer, Civil War officer, editor and publisher, and one-term Republican congressman from Iowa's 7th Congressional District.

== Early life ==
Born in Newton, New Jersey, Cummings attended public schools in Muncy, Pennsylvania.

== Career ==
He was editor of a newspaper in Schuylkill County, Pennsylvania, in 1850, studied law and was admitted to the bar in 1855. He moved to Winterset, Iowa, in 1856; he served as prosecuting attorney for Madison County from 1856 to 1858.

In July 1861, Cummings enlisted in the Union Army, and was made captain of Company F of the 4th Iowa Volunteer Infantry Regiment. He accepted the commission of colonel in the 39th Iowa Volunteer Infantry Regiment on September 12, 1862, and he was honorably discharged on December 22, 1864. Afterward, he became editor and proprietor of the Winterset Madisonian.

In 1876 he was elected as a Republican to succeed John A. Kasson as the representative of Iowa's 7th Congressional District in the U. S. House of Representatives. He served in the 45th United States Congress, from 1877 to 1879. Running for re-election in 1879, he was defeated in the general election by Greenback Party candidate Edward H. Gillette.

== Death ==
Cummings died in Winterset on April 16, 1909, and was interred in Winterset Cemetery.

U.S. House of Representatives
Preceded by John A. Kasson	Member of the U.S. House of Representatives from Iowa's 7th congressional district March 4, 1877 – March 3, 1879 (obsolete district)	Succeeded by Edward H. Gillette
