= William J. Scherle =

American politician

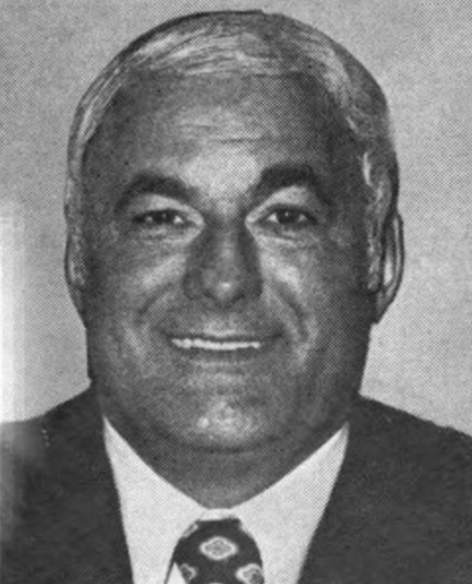

Member of the U.S. House of Representatives from Iowa
- In office January 3, 1967 – January 3, 1975
- Preceded by: John R. Hansen
- Succeeded by: Tom Harkin
- Constituency: 7th district (1967–1973); 5th district (1973–1975)

Member of the Iowa House of Representatives
- In office 1960–1966

Personal details
- Born: March 14, 1923 Little Falls, New York, U.S.
- Died: August 27, 2003 (aged 80) Council Bluffs, Iowa, U.S.
- Party: Republican

William Joseph Scherle (March 14, 1923 – August 27, 2003) was an American politician who served as a U.S. representative from Iowa from 1967 to 1975. He was a member of the Republican Party.

== Early life ==
Born in Little Falls, New York, Scherle graduated from St. Mary's Academy in New York, New York. He served in the United States Navy and Coast Guard from 1942 to 1946, then attended Southern Methodist University of Dallas, Texas from 1945 to 1947.

== Career ==
After briefly serving in 1947 as an assistant division manager with George D. Barnard Co. of Dallas, in 1948 he moved to southwestern Iowa, where he became a grain and livestock farmer. He also served in the United States Naval Reserve from 1947 to 1954. He rose to the rank Boatswain's Mate Chief Petty Officer.

Scherle served as chair of the Mills County Republican Central Committee from 1956 to 1964. In 1960 he was elected as a Republican to the Iowa House of Representatives, where he served until 1966.

In 1966, Scherle was elected to represent Iowa's 7th congressional district in the U.S. House of Representatives, unseating incumbent Democrat John R. Hansen. He was re-elected to that seat in 1968 and 1970. When reapportionment resulted in the loss of one congressional district in Iowa (his own), he ran and won election to Iowa's 5th congressional district in 1972, defeating then-unknown Democrat Tom Harkin.

After making a very public and national campaign against the National Endowment for the Arts, and in particular its funding of the single-word poem "lighght" by Aram Saroyan, Scherle found himself campaigned against by many of Saroyan's supporters including George Plimpton.

In 1974, he ran for re-election but was defeated by Tom Harkin. After losing his re-election bid, Scherle served as Deputy Administrator for the United States Department of Agriculture from 1975 to 1977. He later served as president of a consulting firm in Washington, D.C. from 1977 to 1987.

== Death ==
Scherle died in Council Bluffs, Iowa, from prostate cancer and was interred in Arlington National Cemetery.

== See also ==
- List of members of the House Un-American Activities Committee

U.S. House of Representatives
Preceded by John R. Hansen	Member of the U.S. House of Representatives from Iowa's 7th congressional district January 3, 1967 – January 3, 1973	District abolished
Preceded by Neal E. Smith	Member of the U.S. House of Representatives from Iowa's 5th congressional district January 3, 1973 – January 3, 1975	Succeeded by Tom Harkin
