= Edwin H. Conger =

American congressman and diplomat (1843–1907)

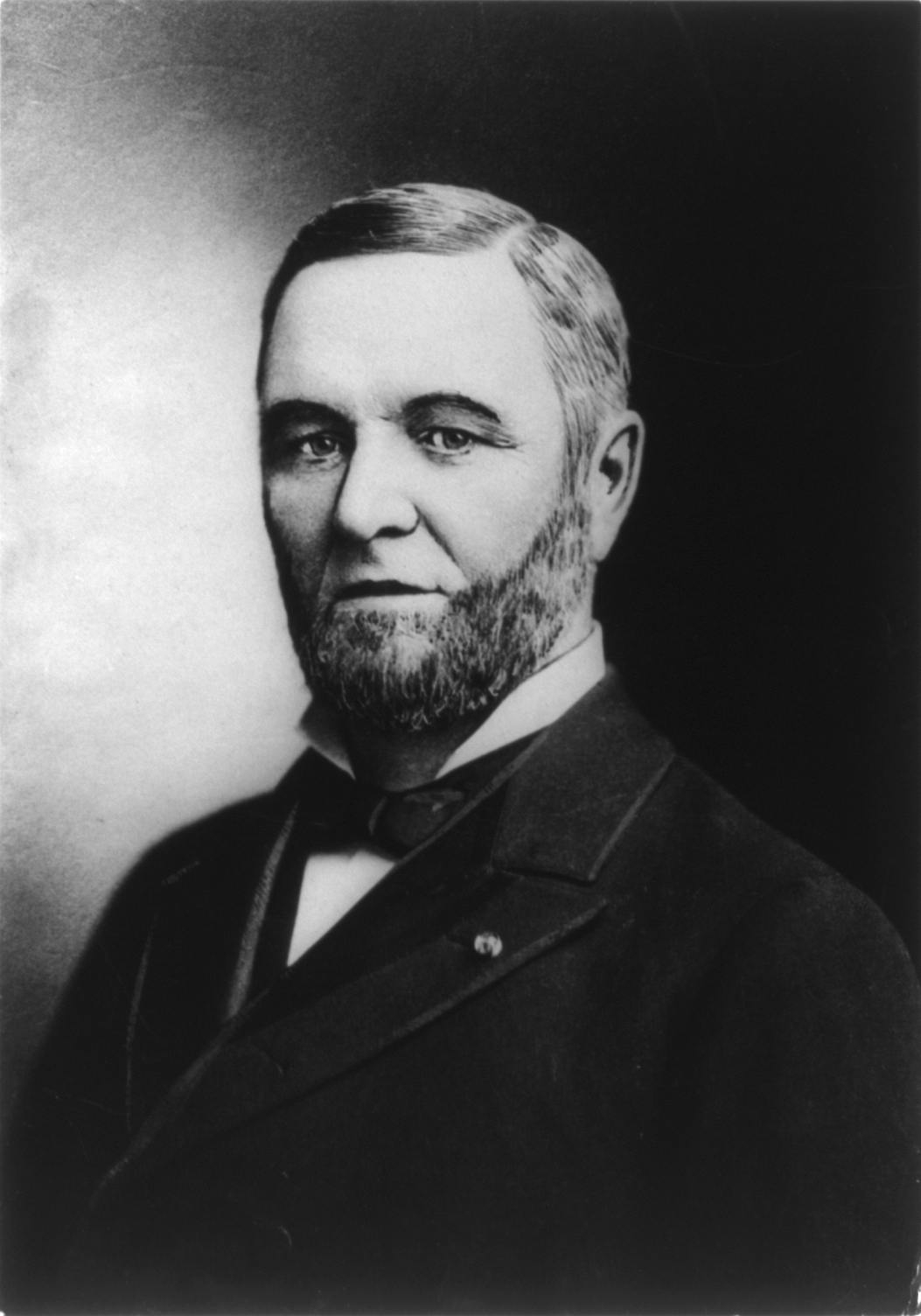

United States Ambassador to Mexico
- In office June 15, 1905 – August 3, 1905
- President: Theodore Roosevelt
- Preceded by: Powell Clayton
- Succeeded by: David E. Thompson

United States Minister to China
- In office July 8, 1898 – April 4, 1905
- President: William McKinley; Theodore Roosevelt
- Preceded by: Charles H. Denby
- Succeeded by: William W. Rockhill

United States Minister to Brazil
- In office August 9, 1897 – February 6, 1898
- President: William McKinley
- Preceded by: Thomas Larkin Thompson
- Succeeded by: Charles Page Bryan
- In office December 19, 1890 – September 9, 1893
- President: Benjamin Harrison; Grover Cleveland
- Preceded by: Robert Adams, Jr.
- Succeeded by: Thomas Larkin Thompson

Member of the U.S. House of Representatives from Iowa's 7th congressional district
- In office March 4, 1885 – October 3, 1890
- Preceded by: Hiram Y. Smith
- Succeeded by: Edward R. Hays

Personal details
- Born: March 7, 1843 Knox County, Illinois, U.S.
- Died: May 18, 1907 (aged 64) Pasadena, California, U.S.
- Party: Republican
- Spouse: Sarah Pike
- Children: 2
- Profession: Politician, lawyer

Military service
- Branch/service: Union Army
- Rank: Major
- Unit: 102nd Illinois Infantry Regiment
- Battles/wars: Civil War

Edwin Hurd Conger (March 7, 1843 – May 18, 1907) was an American Civil War soldier, lawyer, banker, Iowa congressman, and United States diplomat. As the United States' minister to China during the Boxer Rebellion, Conger, his family, and other western diplomatic legations were under siege in Beijing until rescued by the China Relief Expedition.

== Personal background and war service ==
Born in Knox County, Illinois, Conger graduated from Lombard College in 1862. During the Civil War, he enlisted as a private in Company I of the 102nd Illinois Volunteer Infantry Regiment. He was promoted to captain and brevetted major.

At the close of the war, he studied law. He graduated from Albany Law School in 1866 and was admitted to the bar, commencing practice in Galesburg, Illinois. Conger moved to Dexter, Iowa, in south-central Iowa, in 1868 and engaged in banking, livestock, and agricultural pursuits. Conger was married to Sarah Pike, also from Iowa, an author, a Christian Scientist, and a leader of the Woman's Christian Temperance Union who accompanied him to China, and would be later known for befriending China's Empress Dowager Cixi.

== Political activity ==
After winning two terms as treasurer of Dallas County, Iowa in 1877 and 1879, he was elected Iowa State Treasurer in 1880, and reelected in 1882.

In 1884, the incumbent Republican U.S. Representative of Iowa's 7th congressional district, John A. Kasson, declined to seek re-election. Conger won the Republican nomination to succeed him, and the general election (although Kasson's early resignation to accept an ambassadorship, and the election of Hiram Y. Smith to serve out Kasson's term, caused Conger to succeed Smith instead). Conger was re-elected twice (in 1886 and 1888). In Congress, he served as chairman of the Committee on Coinage, Weights, and Measures from 1889 to 1890. In 1890, he entered the race for a fourth term in Congress.

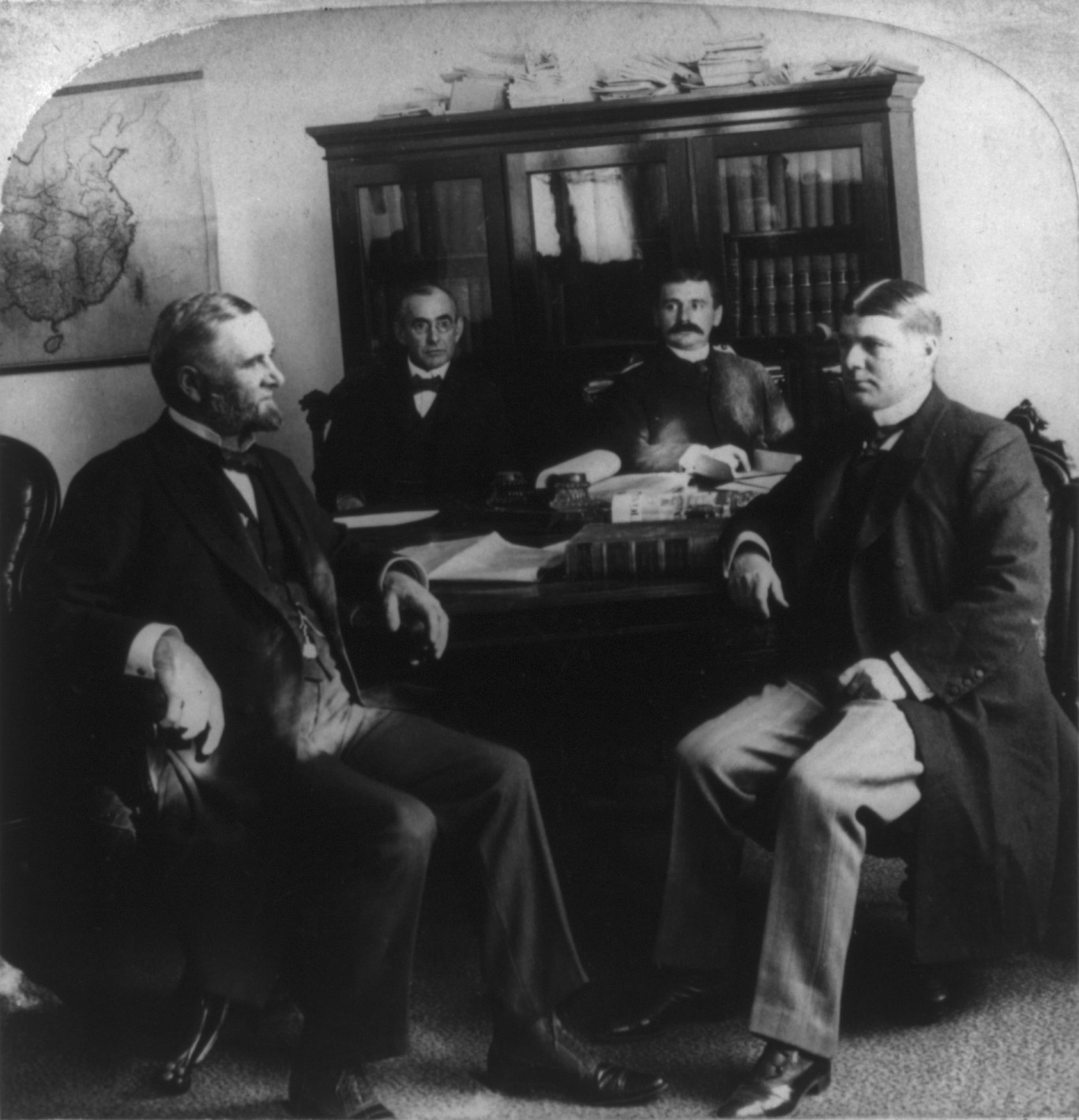
Conger (on left) and staff in the American legation, Beijing, circa 1901

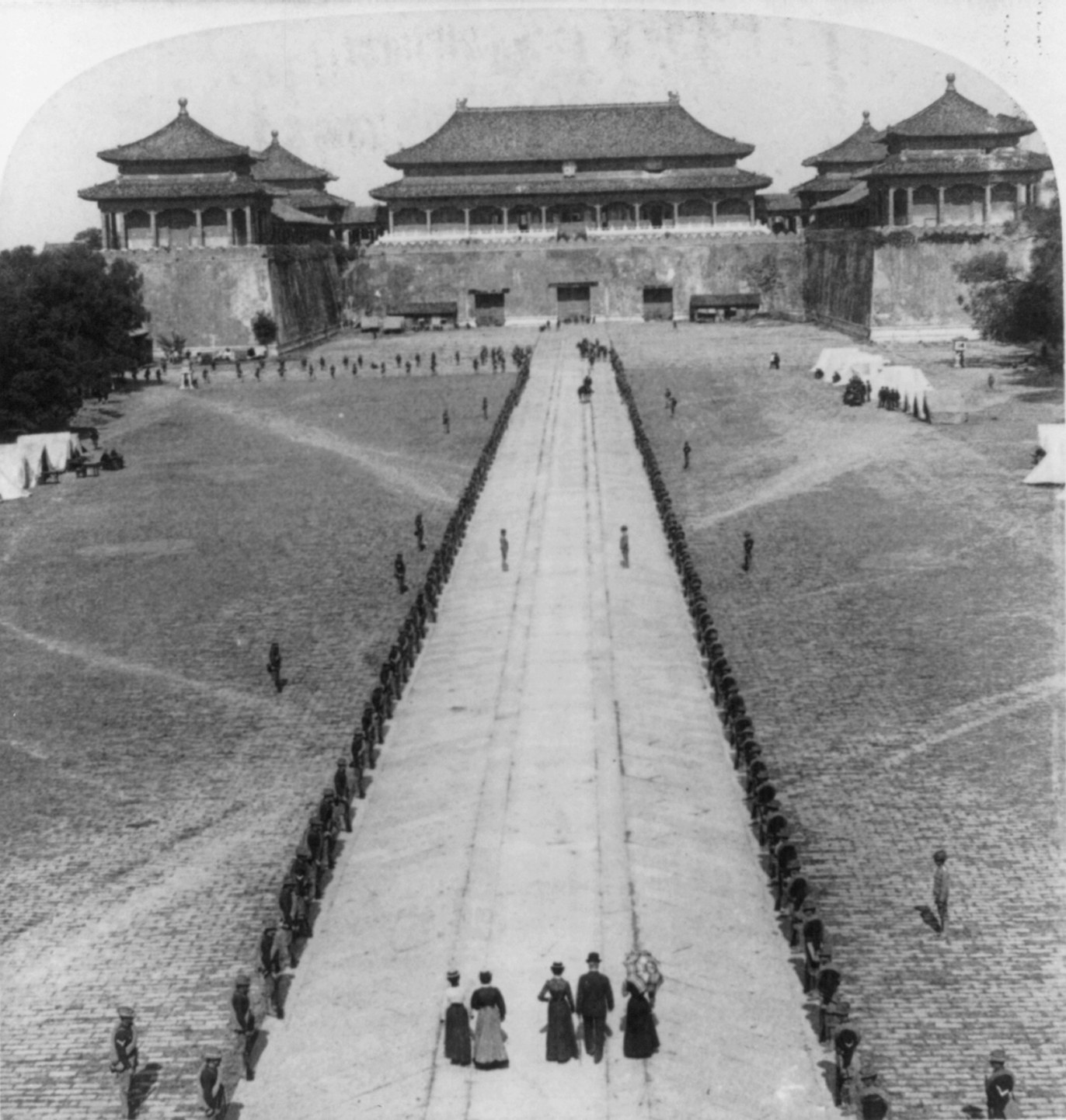
Conger and family in foreground, with 9th Infantry Regiment lined up before the Meridian Gate, Forbidden City, Beijing, circa 1901

== Foreign service ==
In September 1890, less than two months before the general election, Conger resigned his Congressional seat and abandoned his re-election campaign, in order to accept appointment by President Benjamin Harrison as U.S. Envoy Extraordinary and Minister Plenipotentiary to Brazil (a post that today would be called the United States Ambassador). He served until September 1893, when he was replaced by an appointee of incoming Democratic president Grover Cleveland. He returned to that position in 1897 following the election of the next Republican president, William McKinley, serving from August 9, 1897, to February 6, 1898.

In 1898, President McKinley appointed Conger as Envoy Extraordinary and Minister Plenipotentiary to China, where he served as the United States' ambassador to the Qing Empire to handle foreign affairs with China as well as governing the de jure American concession of Tianjin. McKinley had initially nominated Charles Page Bryan for the China post, but when Bryan's lack of relevant experience prompted objections in Congress, McKinley chose Conger for China and nominated Bryan for Conger's former position in Brazil. Conger's arrival in July 1898 coincided with the emergence of a violent anti-foreign, anti-Christian movement, the Society of Righteous and Harmonious Fists in China (known as "Boxers" in English). In June 1900, Boxer fighters gathered in Beijing to besiege the foreign embassies, in what became known outside of China as the Boxer Rebellion.

Sensationalist American newspapers initially reported, in screaming headlines, that Conger was "undoubtedly dead," together with his staff consisting of H. G. Squires, William E. Bainbridge and Fleming D. Cheshire as well as all other foreigners in Beijing. Americans and other westerners retreated to the Beijing Legation Quarter, where they were under siege for fifty-five days (see. Siege of the International Legations) until the Eight-Nation Alliance brought 20,000 troops to their rescue. After receiving a hero's welcome on return to the United States in 1901, Conger resumed his duties in China for several more years, serving until 1905. His wife became a friend of Cixi, the Empress Dowager, and an outspoken critic of Western encroachments on Chinese sovereignty and interference in its internal affairs.

In 1905, Conger was appointed by President Theodore Roosevelt as Ambassador to Mexico. His service in that position was brief; it began on June 15 and ended on August 3, 1905, when President Roosevelt chose Conger for a different post. Roosevelt appointed him to perform a special mission to China made necessary when the United States' interpretation of the Chinese Exclusion Act, and failure to build the Hankow railroad, prompted a boycott of American goods in China. However, a week later, Conger declined the appointment, and resigned his appointment in Mexico effective two months later.

He died in Pasadena, California, on May 18, 1907, and was interred in Mountain View Cemetery in Altadena, California. His death was attributed to a disease contracted in China.

== In popular culture ==
Edwin H. Conger was portrayed by Peter in the 2006 Chinese television series Princess Der Ling.

Political offices
| Preceded by George W. Bemis | Iowa State Treasurer; 1881–1885 | Succeeded by Voltaire P. Twombly |
U.S. House of Representatives
| Preceded by Hiram Y. Smith | Member of the U.S. House of Representatives from Iowa's 7th congressional district March 4, 1885–October 3, 1890 | Succeeded by Edward R. Hays |
Diplomatic posts
| Preceded by Robert Adams, Jr. | United States Minister to Brazil; September 27, 1890–September 9, 1893 | Succeeded by Thomas Larkin Thompson |
| Preceded by Thomas Larkin Thompson | United States Minister to Brazil; August 9, 1897–February 6, 1898 | Succeeded by Charles Page Bryan |
| Preceded by Charles H. Denby | United States Ambassador to China; January 19, 1898–April 4, 1905 | Succeeded by William W. Rockhill |
| Preceded by Powell Clayton | United States Ambassador to Mexico; March 8, 1905–August 3, 1905 | Succeeded by David E. Thompson |
