= List of United States senators in the 51st Congress =

This is a complete list of United States senators during the 51st United States Congress listed by seniority from March 4, 1889, to March 3, 1891.

Order of service is based on the commencement of the senator's first term. Behind this is former service as a senator (only giving the senator seniority within their new incoming class), service as vice president, a House member, a cabinet secretary, or a governor of a state. The final factor is the population of the senator's state.

Senators who were sworn in during the middle of the Congress (up until the last senator who was not sworn in early after winning the November 1890 election) are listed at the end of the list with no number.

== Terms of service ==
Class	Terms of service of senators that expired in years
Class 3	Terms of service of senators that expired in 1891 (AL, AR, CA, CO, CT, FL, GA, IA, ID, IL, IN, KS, KY, LA, MD, MO, NC, NH, NV, NY, ND, OH, OR, PA, SC, SD, VT, WA, and WI.)
Class 1	Terms of service of senators that expired in 1893 (CA, CT, DE, FL, IN, MA, MD, ME, MI, MN, MO, MS, MT, ND, NE, NJ, NV, NY, OH, PA, RI, TN, TX, VA, VT, WA, WI, WV, and WY.)
Class 2	Terms of service of senators that expired in 1895 (AL, AR, CO, DE, GA, IA, ID, IL, KS, KY, LA, MA, ME, MI, MN, MS, MT, NC, NE, NH, NJ, OR, RI, SC, SD, TN, TX, VA, WV, and WY.)

== U.S. Senate seniority list ==
U.S. Senate seniority
Rank	Senator (party-state)	Seniority date	Other factors
1	George F. Edmunds (R-VT)	April 3, 1866	
2	Justin S. Morrill (R-VT)	March 4, 1867	
3	Matt W. Ransom (D-NC)	January 30, 1872	
4	William B. Allison (R-IA)	March 4, 1873	Former representative
5	John J. Ingalls (R-KS)	March 4, 1873	
6	John P. Jones (R-NV)	March 4, 1873	
7	Francis Cockrell (D-MO)	March 4, 1875	
8	Henry L. Dawes (R-MA)	March 4, 1875	
9	George F. Hoar (R-MA)	March 4, 1877	Former representative
10	Isham G. Harris (D-TN)	March 4, 1877	Former governor
11	John T. Morgan (D-AL)	March 4, 1877	
12	John R. McPherson (D-NJ)	March 4, 1877	
13	Matthew Butler (D-SC)	March 4, 1877	
14	Richard Coke (D-TX)	March 4, 1877	
15	Preston B. Plumb (R-KS)	March 4, 1877	
16	James B. Beck (D-KY)	March 4, 1877	
17	J. Donald Cameron (R-PA)	March 20, 1877	
18	Daniel W. Voorhees (D-IN)	November 6, 1877	
19	George G. Vest (D-MO)	March 4, 1879	Missouri 5th in population (1870)
20	Orville H. Platt (R-CT)	March 4, 1879	Connecticut 25th in population (1870)
21	Wilkinson Call (D-FL) (Note: Retired or defeated after 1890 election.)	March 4, 1879	Florida 33rd in population (1870)
22	Zebulon Vance (D-NC)	March 4, 1879	
23	Wade Hampton III (R-SC)	March 4, 1879	
24	Joseph E. Brown (D-GA)	May 26, 1880	
25	James L. Pugh (D-AL)	November 24, 1880	
26	John Sherman (R-OH)	March 4, 1881	Previously a senator
27	Eugene Hale (R-ME)	March 4, 1881	Former representative (10 years)
28	Joseph R. Hawley (R-CT)	March 4, 1881	Former representative (5 years)
29	James Z. George (D-MS)	March 4, 1881	Mississippi 18th in population (1880)
30	Arthur P. Gorman (D-MD)	March 4, 1881	Maryland 20th in population (1880)
31	Philetus Sawyer (R-WI)	March 4, 1881	
32	William P. Frye (R-ME)	March 18, 1881	
33	Nelson Aldrich (R-RI)	October 5, 1881	
34	Alfred H. Colquitt (D-GA)	March 4, 1883	
35	Shelby M. Cullom (R-IL)	March 4, 1883	Former governor
36	James F. Wilson (R-IA)	March 4, 1883	
37	Charles F. Manderson (R-NE)	March 4, 1883	
38	Joseph N. Dolph (R-OR)	March 4, 1883	
39	Randall L. Gibson (D-LA)	March 4, 1883	
40	John E. Kenna (D-WV)	March 4, 1883	
41	Jonathan Chace (R-RI)	January 20, 1885	
42	Henry M. Teller (R-CO)	March 4, 1885	Previously a senator
43	J. C. S. Blackburn (D-KY)	March 4, 1885	Former representative
44	James K. Jones (D-AR)	March 4, 1885	
45	Leland Stanford (R-CA)	March 4, 1885	Former governor
46	William M. Evarts (R-NY)	March 4, 1885	
47	Henry B. Payne (D-OH)	March 4, 1885	
48	John C. Spooner (R-WI)	March 4, 1885	
49	Ephraim K. Wilson II (D-MD) (Note: Senator Wilson died on February 24, 1891.)	March 4, 1885	
50	Henry W. Blair (R-NH)	March 5, 1885	Former representative
51	Edward C. Walthall (D-MS)	March 9, 1885	
52	George Gray (D-DE)	March 18, 1885	
53	James H. Berry (D-AR)	March 20, 1885	
54	John H. Mitchell (R-OR)	November 18, 1885	Previously a senator
55	Charles B. Farwell (R-IL)	January 19, 1887	
56	William M. Stewart (R-NV)	March 4, 1887	Previously a senator (11 years)
57	David Turpie (D-IN)	March 4, 1887	Previously a senator (1 month)
58	John W. Daniel (D-VA)	March 4, 1887	Former representative
59	Francis B. Stockbridge (R-MI)	March 4, 1887	
60	William B. Bate (D-TN)	March 4, 1887	Former governor, Tennessee 12th in population (1880)
61	Cushman K. Davis (R-MN)	March 4, 1887	Former governor, Minnesota 26th in population (1880)
62	Matthew Quay (R-PA)	March 4, 1887	Pennsylvania 2nd in population (1880)
63	Charles J. Faulkner (D-WV)	March 4, 1887	West Virginia 29th in population (1880)
64	Algernon Paddock (R-NE)	March 4, 1887	
65	Rufus Blodgett (R-NJ)	March 4, 1887	
66	Frank Hiscock (R-NY)	March 4, 1887	
67	John H. Reagan (D-TX)	March 4, 1887	
68	George Hearst (D-CA) (Note: Senator Hearst died February 28, 1891.)	March 4, 1887	
69	Samuel Pasco (D-FL)	May 19, 1887	
70	James McMillan (R-MI)	March 4, 1889	
71	Edward O. Wolcott (R-CO)	March 4, 1889	
72	Anthony Higgins (R-DE)	March 4, 1889	
73	William D. Washburn (R-MN)	March 4, 1889	
74	John S. Barbour Jr. (D-VA)	March 4, 1889	
75	Gilman Marston (R-NH) (Note: Senator Marston resigned on June 18, 1889.)	March 4, 1889	
	Nathan F. Dixon III (R-RI)	April 10, 1889	
	William E. Chandler (R-NH)	June 18, 1889	
	Richard F. Pettigrew (R-SD)	November 2, 1889	
	Gideon C. Moody (R-SD)	November 2, 1889	
	Watson C. Squire (R-WA)	November 20, 1889	
	John B. Allen (R-WA)	November 20, 1889	
	Gilbert A. Pierce (R-ND)	November 21, 1889	
	Lyman R. Casey (R-ND)	November 25, 1889	
	Wilbur F. Sanders (R-MT)	January 1, 1890	
	Thomas C. Power (R-MT)	January 2, 1890	
	John G. Carlisle (D-KS)	May 26, 1890	
	Joseph M. Carey (R-WY)	November 15, 1890	
	Francis E. Warren (R-WY)	November 24, 1890	
	George L. Shoup (R-ID)	December 18, 1890	
	William J. McConnell (R-ID)	December 18, 1890	

== See also ==
- 51st United States Congress
- List of United States representatives in the 51st Congress
