= Edward R. Hays =

Union Army soldier and American congressman

Member of the U.S. House of Representatives from Iowa's 7th district
- In office November 4, 1890 – March 3, 1891
- Preceded by: Edwin H. Conger
- Succeeded by: John A. T. Hull

Personal details
- Born: Edward Retilla Hays; May 26, 1847 Fostoria, Ohio, US
- Died: February 28, 1896 (aged 48) Knoxville, Iowa, US
- Occupation: Lawyer

Military service
- Branch/service: Union Army
- Years of service: 1862–1865
- Rank: Private
- Unit: 1st Ohio Heavy Artillery Regiment
- Battles/wars: Civil War

Edward Retilla Hays (May 26, 1847 – February 28, 1896) was a nineteenth-century politician, soldier, and lawyer from Ohio and Iowa, who briefly represented Iowa's 7th congressional district in the U.S. House of Representatives.

== Biography ==
Born in Fostoria, Ohio, Hays attended rural schools near Tiffin, Ohio, as a child. During the Civil War, he served as a private in the 1st Ohio Heavy Artillery Regiment from 1862 to 1865.

Afterwards, he studied law and was admitted to the bar in 1869, commencing practice in Knoxville, Iowa. He served on the local school board and on the City Council.

In September 1890, less than two months before the general election, Republican U.S. Representative Edwin H. Conger resigned his Congressional seat representing Iowa's 7th congressional district to accept President Benjamin Harrison's appointment as United States Ambassador to Brazil. Iowa Governor Horace Boies added to the already-scheduled November 1890 election ballot a special election to choose an immediate successor who would complete the final months of Conger's term. Hays was chosen as the Republican nominee for this special election. After winning the election on November 4, 1890 by 2,560 votes, he served in a second session that began in December 1890 and ended on March 3, 1891.

Returning from Washington, he resumed practicing law until his death in Knoxville, on February 28, 1896. He was interred in Graceland Cemetery in Knoxville.

U.S. House of Representatives
Preceded by Edwin H. Conger	Member of the U.S. House of Representatives from Iowa's 7th congressional district November 4, 1890 – March 3, 1891 (obsolete district)	Succeeded by John A. T. Hull
