= John A. Kasson =

American politician (1822–1910)

John Adam Kasson
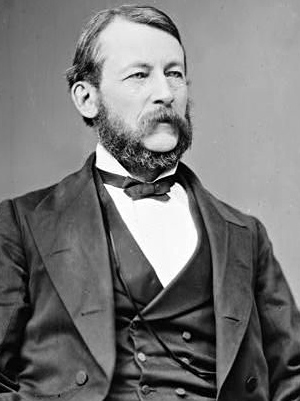

10th United States Minister to Austria-Hungary
- In office May 11, 1877 – March 25, 1881
- President: Rutherford B. Hayes; James A. Garfield
- Preceded by: Edward F. Beale
- Succeeded by: William Walter Phelps

United States Envoy to the German Empire
- In office September 10, 1884 – June 21, 1885
- President: Chester A. Arthur; Grover Cleveland
- Preceded by: Aaron A. Sargent
- Succeeded by: George H. Pendleton

Member of the U.S. House of Representatives from Iowa
- In office March 4, 1863 – March 3, 1867
- Preceded by: District established
- Succeeded by: Grenville M. Dodge
- Constituency: 5th district
- In office March 4, 1873 – March 3, 1877
- Preceded by: District established
- Succeeded by: Henry J. B. Cummings
- Constituency: 7th district
- In office March 4, 1881 – July 13, 1884
- Preceded by: Edward H. Gillette
- Succeeded by: Hiram Y. Smith
- Constituency: 7th district

Member of the Iowa House of Representatives from the Polk County district
- In office 1868–1872 Serving with Joshua H. Hatch, George W. Jones, James M. Tuttle
- Preceded by: Hoyt Sherman and George Lute Godfrey
- Succeeded by: William G. Madden and Isaac Brandt

Personal details
- Born: January 11, 1822 Charlotte, Vermont, U.S.
- Died: May 18, 1910 (aged 88) Washington, D.C., U.S.
- Party: Republican
- Profession: Politician; lawyer
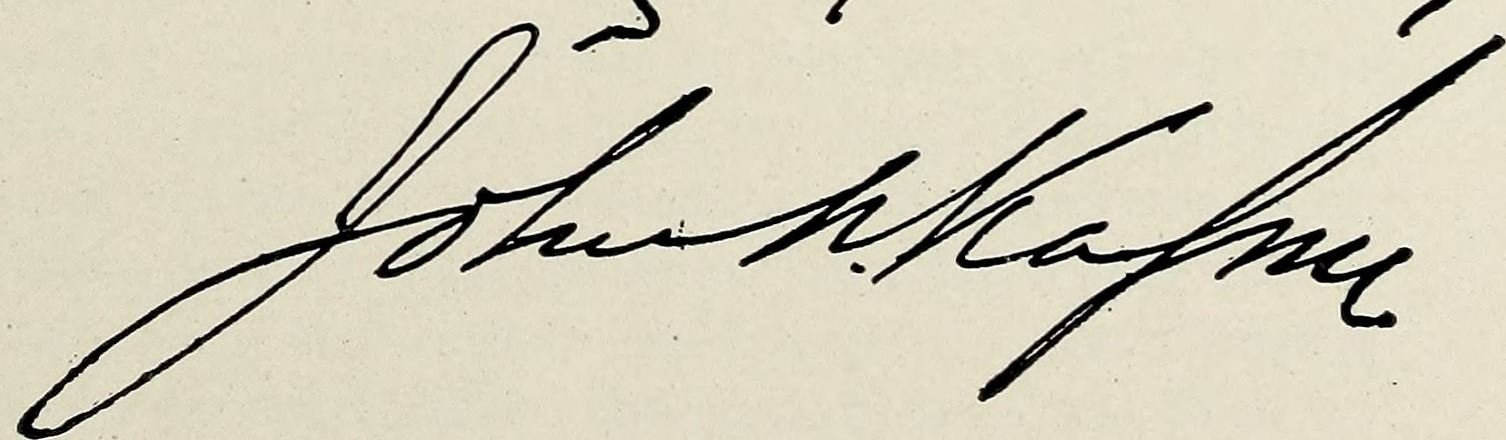
- Signature

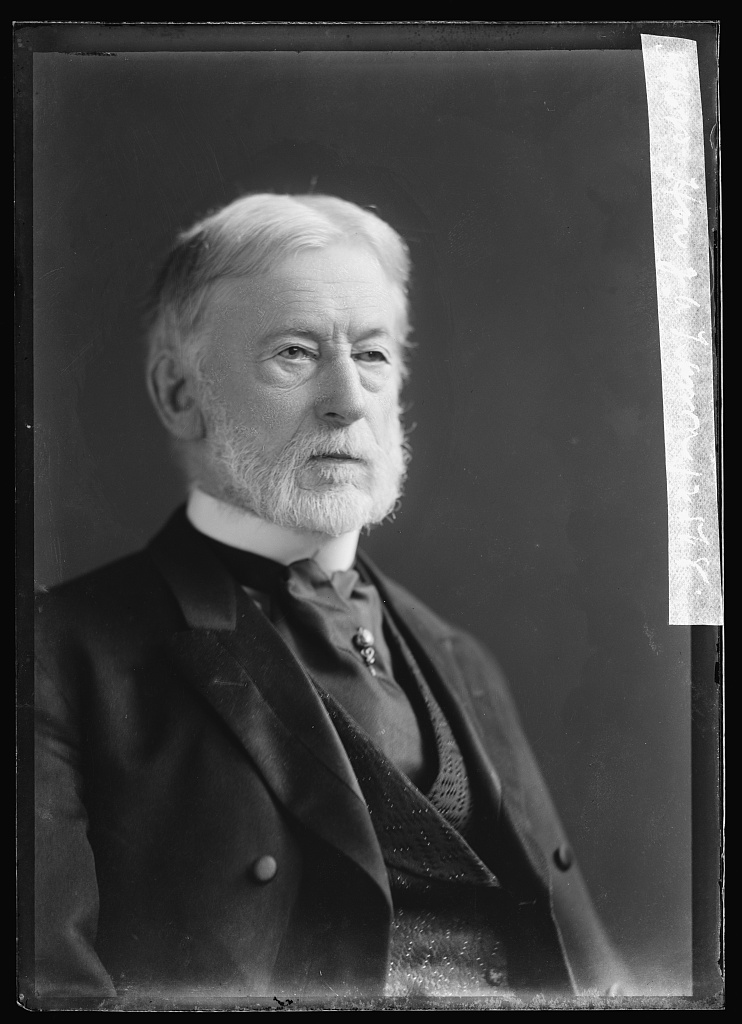
Kasson by C. M. Bell Studio c. 1905

John Adam Kasson (January 11, 1822 – May 18, 1910) was a nineteenth-century lawyer, politician and diplomat from south-central Iowa. Elected to the U.S. House six times, he repeatedly interrupted his congressional service to serve in the Diplomatic service in many different capacities.

== Biography ==
He was born in Charlotte, Vermont, on January 11, 1822, to John Steele Kasson and Nancy Blackman. Kasson attended local school as a child and later graduated from the University of Vermont in 1842. He studied law and was admitted to the bar, commencing practice in St. Louis, Missouri. He moved to Des Moines, Iowa, in 1857 and commenced practice there.

He was a delegate to the Republican National Convention in 1860, where he quickly rose to a position of great influence. Appointed as Iowa's representative on the platform committee, he was one of five delegates on the subcommittee responsible for reconciling competing resolutions into a coherent platform, and in the end was the principal draftsman of the final product, including the antislavery planks that were referenced by southern states as they seceded upon Abraham Lincoln's election. In 1861, President Lincoln appointed Kasson as First Assistant Postmaster General, a position he held until August 1862.

In 1862, Kasson was elected a Republican to represent Iowa's new 5th congressional district in the United States House of Representatives. His district included 22 counties in the southwestern quadrant of Iowa, including the city of Des Moines. He represented that district for two terms, from 1863 to 1867. There, he served as chairman of the United States House Committee on Coinage, Weights, and Measures from 1863 to 1867, during which time the Metric Act of 1866, which he drafted, was passed. He was a commissioner from the United States to the International Postal Congress in Paris, France, in 1863. However, in 1866 he lost the Republican nomination to Civil War and Indian Campaign General Grenville M. Dodge. Afterward, he was a commissioner from the United States to negotiate postal conventions with Great Britain, France, Belgium, the Netherlands, Germany, Switzerland and Italy in 1867.

In 1868 he was elected to the Iowa House of Representatives, where he served until 1872. That year he was returned to the U.S. House to represent Iowa's new 7th congressional district, made up of ten counties in south-central Iowa. He represented that district in Congress for four years, serving from 1873 to 1877. He did not seek renomination in 1876, even though the New York Times reported that summer that he would have "good chances of success" as a candidate to become the next Speaker of the House.

In 1877 Kasson was appointed Envoy Extraordinary and Minister Plenipotentiary to Austria-Hungary by President Rutherford B. Hayes, a position he held until early 1881. At his suggestion, the four dollar Stella pattern coins were minted in 1879 and 1880.

In 1880 he ran once again for Congress, again winning the Republican nomination and general election to represent Iowa's 7th congressional district in the U.S. House. Once again, he was re-elected. His final period in Congress ended in 1884, when he was appointed Envoy and Head of the U.S. Legation at Berlin, Germany, by President Chester A. Arthur. He served in that position until 1885, when he was named as a special envoy to the Congo Conference in Berlin. He was also a special envoy to the Samoan International Conference in 1889. Kasson was a special commissioner plenipotentiary from the United States to negotiate reciprocity treaties in 1897 and was a member of the United States and British Joint High Commission to adjust differences with Canada in 1898.

Kasson died in Washington, D.C., on May 18, 1910, and was interred in Woodland Cemetery in Des Moines.

U.S. House of Representatives
| New district | Member of the U.S. House of Representatives from Iowa's 5th congressional district 1863–1867 | Succeeded by Grenville M. Dodge |
| New district | Member of the U.S. House of Representatives from Iowa's 7th congressional district 1873–1877 | Succeeded by Henry J. B. Cummings |
| Preceded by Edward H. Gillette | Member of the U.S. House of Representatives from Iowa's 7th congressional district 1881–1884 | Succeeded by Hiram Y. Smith |
Diplomatic posts
| Preceded by Edward F. Beale | U.S. Ambassador to Austria-Hungary; 1877–1881 | Succeeded by William W. Phelps |
| Preceded by Aaron A. Sargent | U.S. Ambassador to the German Empire; 1884–1885 | Succeeded by George H. Pendleton |
