= Iowa's 7th congressional district =

Former congressional district

- Obsolete district
- Created: 1870
- Eliminated: 1970
- Years active: 1873–1973

Iowa's 7th congressional district is a former congressional district in Iowa. It was eliminated after the 1970 election, leaving Iowa with six congressional districts. The state has since been reduced to four congressional districts.

== Redistricting ==
The 7th District was reformed for the 1932 election and Iowa dropped its 10th and 11th districts. Cassius C. Dowell ran for and won the 6th Congressional District, while Otha D. Wearin took over the 7th Congressional District. The district was eliminated as a result of the 1970 census. All of the district was then put in the 5th congressional district, with the exception of Crawford and Monona counties which were put in the 6th district.

== List of members representing the district ==
Member	Party	Term	Cong ress	Electoral history
District created March 4, 1873
John A. Kasson (Des Moines)	Republican	March 4, 1873 – March 3, 1877	43rd 44th	Elected in 1872. Re-elected in 1874. Retired.
Henry J. B. Cummings (Winterset)	Republican	March 4, 1877 – March 3, 1879	45th	Elected in 1876. Lost re-election.
Edward H. Gillette (Des Moines)	Greenback	March 4, 1879 – March 3, 1881	46th	Elected in 1878. Lost re-election.
John A. Kasson (Des Moines)	Republican	March 4, 1881 – July 13, 1884	47th 48th	Elected in 1880. Re-elected in 1882. Resigned when appointed US Ambassador to Germany.
Vacant		July 13, 1884 – December 2, 1884	48th	
Hiram Y. Smith (Des Moines)	Republican	December 2, 1884 – March 3, 1885	48th	Elected to finish Kasson's term. Retired.
Edwin H. Conger (Des Moines)	Republican	March 4, 1885 – October 3, 1890	49th 50th 51st	Elected in 1884. Re-elected in 1886. Re-elected in 1888. Resigned when appointed US Ambassador to Brazil.
Vacant		October 3, 1890 – November 4, 1890	51st	
Edward R. Hays (Knoxville)	Republican	November 4, 1890 – March 3, 1891	51st	Elected to finish Conger's term. Retired.
John A. T. Hull (Des Moines)	Republican	March 4, 1891 – March 3, 1911	52nd 53rd 54th 55th 56th 57th 58th 59th 60th 61st	Elected in 1890. Re-elected in 1892. Re-elected in 1894. Re-elected in 1896. Re-elected in 1898. Re-elected in 1900. Re-elected in 1902. Re-elected in 1904. Re-elected in 1906. Re-elected in 1908. Lost renomination.
Solomon F. Prouty (Des Moines)	Republican	March 4, 1911 – March 3, 1915	62nd 63rd	Elected in 1910. Re-elected in 1912. Retired.
Cassius C. Dowell (Des Moines)	Republican	March 4, 1915 – March 3, 1933	64th 65th 66th 67th 68th 69th 70th 71st 72nd	Elected in 1914. Re-elected in 1916. Re-elected in 1918. Re-elected in 1920. Re-elected in 1922. Re-elected in 1924. Re-elected in 1926. Re-elected in 1928. Re-elected in 1930. Redistricted to the 6th district.
Otha Wearin (Hastings)	Democratic	March 4, 1933 – January 3, 1939	73rd 74th 75th	Elected in 1932. Re-elected in 1934. Re-elected in 1936. Retired to run for U.S. Senator.
Ben F. Jensen (Exira)	Republican	January 3, 1939 – January 3, 1965	76th 77th 78th 79th 80th 81st 82nd 83rd 84th 85th 86th 87th 88th	Elected in 1938. Re-elected in 1940. Re-elected in 1942. Re-elected in 1944. Re-elected in 1946. Re-elected in 1948. Re-elected in 1950. Re-elected in 1952. Re-elected in 1954. Re-elected in 1956. Re-elected in 1958. Re-elected in 1960. Re-elected in 1962. Lost re-election.
John R. Hansen (Manning)	Democratic	January 3, 1965 – January 3, 1967	89th	Elected in 1964. Lost re-election.
William J. Scherle (Henderson)	Republican	January 3, 1967 – January 3, 1973	90th 91st 92nd	Elected in 1966. Re-elected in 1968. Re-elected in 1970. Redistricted to the 5th district.
District eliminated January 3, 1973

== Election history ==
Year	Party affiliation	Winner	Number of votes	Party affiliation	Loser	Number of votes	Percentage of votes
1920	Republican	Cassius C. Dowell	41,644	Socialist	Charles Gay	1,272	97% - 3%
1922	Republican	Cassius C. Dowell	34,012	Democrat	Winfred E. Robb	19,987	62% - 36%
1924	Republican	Cassius C. Dowell	66,550	Democrat	William M. Wade	18,454	78% - 22%
1926	Republican	Cassius C. Dowell	34,159	Democrat	William M. Wade	10,255	77% - 23%
1928	Republican	Cassius C. Dowell	72,404	N/A	N/A	0	100% - 0%
1930	Republican	Cassius C. Dowell	36,715	Democrat	Carl Evans	11,372	76% - 24%
1932	Democrat	Otha D. Wearin	57,803	Republican	Charles Edward Swanson	44,925	56% - 43%
1934	Democrat	Otha D. Wearin	51,395	Republican	Charles Edward Swanson	47,508	52% - 48%
1936	Democrat	Otha D. Wearin	61,398	Republican	Henry K. Peterson	59,834	50% - 49%
1938	Republican	Ben F. Jensen	54,922	Democrat	Roger F. Warin	37,992	59% - 41%
1940	Republican	Ben F. Jensen	71,633	Democrat	Ernest M. Miller	50,644	59% - 41%
1942	Republican	Ben F. Jensen	49,086	Democrat	Jess Alton	27,409	64% - 36%
1944	Republican	Ben F. Jensen	66,905	Democrat	Albert McGinn	41,802	62% - 38%
1946	Republican	Ben F. Jensen	40,152	Democrat	Philip A. Allen	23,567	63% - 37%
1948	Republican	Ben F. Jensen	59,173	Democrat	W. A. Byers	44,857	57% - 43%
1950	Republican	Ben F. Jensen	55,291	Democrat	James A. Hart	33,617	62% - 38%
1952	Republican	Ben F. Jensen	82,462	Democrat	Thomas J. Keleher	39,999	67% - 33%
1954	Republican	Ben F. Jensen	51,022	Democrat	Elmer G. Carlson	33,492	60% - 40%
1956	Republican	Ben F. Jensen	64,967	Democrat	John L. Jensen	52,389	55% - 45%
1958	Republican	Ben F. Jensen	41,053	Democrat	Ellsworth O. Hays	38,660	52% - 48%
1960	Republican	Ben F. Jensen	66,037	Democrat	Duane Orton	52,214	56% - 44%
1962	Republican	Ben F. Jensen	56,341	Democrat	Ed Peters	44,171	56% - 44%
1964	Democrat	John R. Hansen	78,243	Republican	Ben F. Jensen	67,942	54% - 46%
1966	Republican	William J. Scherle	64,217	Democrat	John R. Hansen	44,529	59% - 41%
1968	Republican	William J. Scherle	64,217	Democrat	Richard C. Oshlo	44,529	48% - 33%
1970	Republican	William J. Scherle	53,084	Democrat	Lou Galetich	31,552	63% - 37%

== See also ==
- List of United States representatives from Iowa
- Iowa's congressional districts
