= Henry W. Washburn =

American politician (1899–1983)

Henry Wearin Washburn (18 June 1899 – 8 August 1983) was an American politician.

Henry Wearin Washburn was born on 18 June 1899 to Albert Benjamin Washburn and his wife Mary Valeria Wearrin. The family resided on a farm near Hastings, Iowa. Washburn had four siblings, all of whom died young. Until the eighth grade, Washburn attended country school, then was educated at Tabor Academy and Tabor College, both in Tabor, Iowa. He began farming with his father, and later ran his own. Washburn married Tabor native Alice Theodore Wilkins, with whom he had a daughter and a son. Albert Theodore served in the United States Navy during World War II and returned to the family farm after leaving military service. Mary Alice became a nurse and married Dale E. Matthews.

Henry Washburn, a Republican, served on the rural school board and the county school board before winning election to the Iowa House of Representatives in 1948, from District 11. He was reelected to the state house in 1950, then served a single term on the Iowa Senate between 1953 and 1957 for District 8. Washburn died on 8 August 1983.
