= Albert Benjamin Washburn =

American politician (1869–1942)

Albert Benjamin Washburn (28 October 1869 – 26 September 1942) was an American politician.

Albert Benjamin Washburn was raised on the family farm in Winneshiek County, Iowa, by parents John P. and Ellen Divine Washburn. One of six children, A. B. Washburn was born on 28 October 1869. After attending Winneshiek County schools, Washburn enrolled at Western College in Toledo, then pursued further education at Coe College and Upper Iowa University. He married Mary Valeria Wearrin, a daughter of Otha and Mary Wortman Wearin in February 1893, and moved to Mills County, near Hastings, where they farmed. Of their five children, three died in infancy, another as a young adult, and only one, Henry, survived Albert. A. B. Washburn was twice elected to the Iowa House of Representatives as a Republican from District 11, and held office from 1904 to 1907.

Washburn was a Methodist; he joined the church in Traer at the age of 13, and transferred his membership to Emerson in 1902, where he held several positions on the ecclesiastical board. He died on 26 September 1942.
